= 2019–20 Érd HC season =

Érd HC
2019–20 season
- Chairman: Norbert Tekauer
- Manager: Edina Szabó
Home colours	Away colours

The 2019–20 season will be Érd HC's 10th competitive and consecutive season in the Nemzeti Bajnokság I and 46nd year in existence as a handball club.

== Players ==
=== Squad information ===
Goalkeepers

- 13 (Hungary) Kinga Janurik (c)
- 97 (France) Julie Foggea

Left Wingers

- 53 (Hungary) Natalie Schatzl
- 91 (Slovakia) (Hungary) Réka Bízik
- 93 (Hungary) Szonja Gávai

Right Wingers

- 3 (Brazil) Alexandra do Nascimento
- 32 (Hungary) Réka Király
- 33 (Serbia) (Hungary) Katarina Krpež-Šlezak (pregnant)

Line players

- 3 (Hungary) Armilla Simon
- 8 (Hungary) Laura Szabó
- 14 (Hungary) Anett Kisfaludy

Left Backs

- 43 (Hungary) Rita Termány
- 46 (Hungary) Gabriella Landi
- 51 (Czech Republic) Markéta Jeřábková

Centre Backs

- 24 (Serbia) Jovana Kovačević
- 96 (Hungary) Gabriella Tóth

Right Backs

- 9 (Serbia) Jelena Lavko
- 23 (Hungary) Nikolett Kiss

=== Transfers ===
Source: hetmeteres.hu

In:

- Réka Bízik (from Mosonmagyaróvár)
- (Brazil) Alexandra do Nascimento (from Alba Fehérvár)
- Rita Termány (from MTK Budapest)

Out:

- Barbara Kovács (to Budaörs)
- Gabriella Landi (loan to Budaörs)
- (France) Coralie Lassource (to (France) Brest Bretagne)
- Sára Reizinger (to Budaörs)

== Club ==
=== Technical Staff ===
Position	Staff member
President	(Hungary) Norbert Tekauer
Head coach	(Hungary) Edina Szabó
Technical Director	(Hungary) Andrea Kemény
Assistant coaches	(France) Sébastien Gardillou
Goalkeeping coach	(Hungary) Marianna Rácz
Team doctor	(Hungary) Dr. Miklós Kator
Masseur	(Hungary) Kálmán Kiss
Fitness coach	(Iceland) Ragnar Óskarsson

Source: Coach & Staff

=== Uniform ===
- Supplier: 2Rule
- Main sponsor: tippmix / Noé Állatotthon
- Back sponsor: Di-Fer Kft.

== Competitions ==
=== Overview ===
Win Draw Loss

Competition	First match	Last match	Starting round	Final position	Record							
Competition	First match	Last match	Starting round	Final position	Pld	W	D	L	GF	GA	GD	Win %
Nemzeti Bajnokság I	31 August 2019	23 May 2020	Matchday 1	Matchday 26	11	8	1	2	359	253	+106	72.73
Magyar Kupa	29 January 2020	29 January 2020	Fourth round	Fourth round	1	0	0	1	26	29	−3	0.00
EHF Cup	10 November 2019	9 February 2020	Third qualifying round	Group stage	8	3	2	3	222	217	+5	37.50
Total					20	11	3	6	607	499	+108	55.00

Last updated: 31 January 2020
Source: Competitions

=== Nemzeti Bajnokság I ===
==== Results by round ====
Match	1	2	3	4	5	6	7	8	9	10	11	12	13	14	15	16	17	18	19	20	21	22	23	24	25	26
Ground	H	A	H	A	H	H	A	H	H	A	H	A	H	A	H	A	H	A	H	A	H	A	A	A	H	A
Result	L	W	W	W	W	L	L	W	W	W	W	W	W	L	L	L	W	L								

Updated to match(es) played on 5 February 2020. Source: Matches
A = Away; H = Home; W = Win; D = Draw; L = Loss

==== Matches ====
Round 1; 31 August 2019; 17:15	Érd	28–31	FTC-Rail Cargo Hungaria	Érd Aréna, Érd; Attendance: 2,000; Referees: Andorka, Hucker
Round 1; 31 August 2019; 17:15	three players 6	(12–17)	Háfra 10	Érd Aréna, Érd; Attendance: 2,000; Referees: Andorka, Hucker
Round 1; 31 August 2019; 17:15	2× (yellow card) 1× (suspension)	Report	2× (yellow card) 1× (suspension)	Érd Aréna, Érd; Attendance: 2,000; Referees: Andorka, Hucker

Round 2; 7 September 2019; 18:00	Dunaújvárosi Kohász KA	25–26	Érd	Municipal Sports Hall, Dunaújváros; Attendance: 700; Referees: Paska, Vastag
Round 2; 7 September 2019; 18:00	Szalai, Szekerczés 7	(13–12)	Schatzl 6	Municipal Sports Hall, Dunaújváros; Attendance: 700; Referees: Paska, Vastag
Round 2; 7 September 2019; 18:00	1× (yellow card) 2× (suspension)	Report	2× (yellow card) 3× (suspension)	Municipal Sports Hall, Dunaújváros; Attendance: 700; Referees: Paska, Vastag

Round 3; 14 September 2019; 18:00	Érd	36–24	MTK Budapest	Érd Aréna, Érd; Attendance: 750; Referees: Őri, Podzena
Round 3; 14 September 2019; 18:00	Jeřábková 6	(18–14)	Tóth 7	Érd Aréna, Érd; Attendance: 750; Referees: Őri, Podzena
Round 3; 14 September 2019; 18:00	1× (yellow card) 4× (suspension)	Report	1× (yellow card) 3× (suspension)	Érd Aréna, Érd; Attendance: 750; Referees: Őri, Podzena

Round 4; 20 September 2019; 18:30	Motherson-Mosonmagyaróvár	22–29	Érd	UFM Aréna, Mosonmagyaróvár; Attendance: 1,100; Referees: Bacs, Bóna
Round 4; 20 September 2019; 18:30	Lancz 6	(9–11)	Tóth 9	UFM Aréna, Mosonmagyaróvár; Attendance: 1,100; Referees: Bacs, Bóna
Round 4; 20 September 2019; 18:30	2× (yellow card) 4× (suspension)	Report	2× (yellow card) 6× (suspension)	UFM Aréna, Mosonmagyaróvár; Attendance: 1,100; Referees: Bacs, Bóna

Round 5; 9 October 2019; 18:00	Érd	29–33	DVSC Schaeffler	Érd Aréna, Érd; Attendance: 1,100; Referees: Hargitai, Markó
Round 5; 9 October 2019; 18:00	Tóth 6	(13–21)	Kovács 5	Érd Aréna, Érd; Attendance: 1,100; Referees: Hargitai, Markó
Round 5; 9 October 2019; 18:00	3× (yellow card) 5× (suspension)	Report	3× (yellow card) 3× (suspension)	Érd Aréna, Érd; Attendance: 1,100; Referees: Hargitai, Markó

Round 6; 16 October 2019; 20:00	Győri Audi ETO KC	39–28	Érd	Audi Aréna, Győr; Attendance: 3,565; Referees: Andorka, Hucker
Round 6; 16 October 2019; 20:00	Brattset 10	(22–16)	Tóth 7	Audi Aréna, Győr; Attendance: 3,565; Referees: Andorka, Hucker
Round 6; 16 October 2019; 20:00	2× (yellow card) 2× (suspension)	Report	2× (yellow card) 2× (suspension)	Audi Aréna, Győr; Attendance: 3,565; Referees: Andorka, Hucker

Round 7; 26 October 2019; 18:00	Érd	38–21	Hungast-Szombathelyi KKA	Érd Aréna, Érd; Attendance: 900; Referees: Marton, Szabó
Round 7; 26 October 2019; 18:00	Kovačević, Tóth 7	(20–14)	Filipović-Bandelier 7	Érd Aréna, Érd; Attendance: 900; Referees: Marton, Szabó
Round 7; 26 October 2019; 18:00	2× (yellow card) 3× (suspension)	Report	1× (yellow card) 3× (suspension)	Érd Aréna, Érd; Attendance: 900; Referees: Marton, Szabó

Round 8; 3 November 2019; 14:30	Kisvárda Master Good SE	27–29	Érd	Municipal Sports Hall, Kisvárda; Attendance: 990; Referees: Hantos, Rózsahegyi
Round 8; 3 November 2019; 14:30	Habánková, Siska 6	(14–14)	Kisfaludy, Kovačević 5	Municipal Sports Hall, Kisvárda; Attendance: 990; Referees: Hantos, Rózsahegyi
Round 8; 3 November 2019; 14:30	1× (yellow card) 2× (suspension)	Report	1× (yellow card) 5× (suspension)	Municipal Sports Hall, Kisvárda; Attendance: 990; Referees: Hantos, Rózsahegyi

Round 9; 5 October 2019; 14:30	Érd	27–21	Siófok KC	Érd Aréna, Érd; Attendance: 1,800; Referees: Bócz, Wiedemann
Round 9; 5 October 2019; 14:30	do Nascimento 7	(14–9)	Niombla 5	Érd Aréna, Érd; Attendance: 1,800; Referees: Bócz, Wiedemann
Round 9; 5 October 2019; 14:30	2× (yellow card) 2× (suspension) 1× (red card)	Report	2× (yellow card) 2× (suspension) 1× (red card)	Érd Aréna, Érd; Attendance: 1,800; Referees: Bócz, Wiedemann

Round 10; 20 October 2019; 18:00	Érd	50–23	Szent István SE	Érd Aréna, Érd; Attendance: 800; Referees: Kovács-Sebők, Réti
Round 10; 20 October 2019; 18:00	do Nascimento 12	(25–14)	Monori 7	Érd Aréna, Érd; Attendance: 800; Referees: Kovács-Sebők, Réti
Round 10; 20 October 2019; 18:00	2× (yellow card) 2× (suspension)	Report	3× (suspension)	Érd Aréna, Érd; Attendance: 800; Referees: Kovács-Sebők, Réti

Round 11; 29 December 2019; 15:45	Érd	35–25	Alba Fehérvár KC	Érd Aréna, Érd; Attendance: 1,500; Referees: Bócz, Wiedemann
Round 11; 29 December 2019; 15:45	do Nascimento 7	(18–12)	Mendy 7	Érd Aréna, Érd; Attendance: 1,500; Referees: Bócz, Wiedemann
Round 11; 29 December 2019; 15:45	2× (yellow card) 5× (suspension)	Report	2× (yellow card) 4× (suspension)	Érd Aréna, Érd; Attendance: 1,500; Referees: Bócz, Wiedemann

Round 12; 8 January 2020; 19:00	Váci NKSE	31–34	Érd	Municipal Sports Hall, Vác; Attendance: 460; Referees: Medve, Südi
Round 12; 8 January 2020; 19:00	Kuczora 10	(15–18)	Jeřábková 8	Municipal Sports Hall, Vác; Attendance: 460; Referees: Medve, Südi
Round 12; 8 January 2020; 19:00	3× (yellow card) 2× (suspension)	Report	5× (suspension)	Municipal Sports Hall, Vác; Attendance: 460; Referees: Medve, Südi

Round 13; 15 January 2020; 18:00	Érd	36–29	EUbility Group-Békéscsaba	Érd Aréna, Érd; Attendance: 1,500; Referees: Sándor, Szikszay
Round 13; 15 January 2020; 18:00	do Nascimento 9	(17–15)	Mitrović 7	Érd Aréna, Érd; Attendance: 1,500; Referees: Sándor, Szikszay
Round 13; 15 January 2020; 18:00	2× (yellow card) 3× (suspension)	Report	3× (yellow card) 6× (suspension)	Érd Aréna, Érd; Attendance: 1,500; Referees: Sándor, Szikszay

Round 14; 22 January 2020; 19:30	FTC-Rail Cargo Hungaria	33–32	Érd	Elek Gyula Aréna, Budapest; Attendance: 1,100; Referees: Bíró, Kiss
Round 14; 22 January 2020; 19:30	Schatzl 8	(16–15)	Tóth 8	Elek Gyula Aréna, Budapest; Attendance: 1,100; Referees: Bíró, Kiss
Round 14; 22 January 2020; 19:30	2× (yellow card) 2× (suspension)	Report	2× (yellow card) 7× (suspension)	Elek Gyula Aréna, Budapest; Attendance: 1,100; Referees: Bíró, Kiss

Round 15; 5 February 2020; 18:00	Érd	26–28	Dunaújvárosi Kohász KA	Érd Aréna, Érd; Attendance: 1,300; Referees: Andorka, Hucker
Round 15; 5 February 2020; 18:00	do Nascimento 6	(15–15)	Triscsuk 6	Érd Aréna, Érd; Attendance: 1,300; Referees: Andorka, Hucker
Round 15; 5 February 2020; 18:00	1× (yellow card) 2× (suspension)	Report	2× (yellow card) 4× (suspension)	Érd Aréna, Érd; Attendance: 1,300; Referees: Andorka, Hucker

Round 16; 15 February 2020; 18:00	MTK Budapest	40–35	Érd	Elektromos hall, Budapest; Attendance: 350; Referees: Felhő, Öcsi
Round 16; 15 February 2020; 18:00	Tóth 12	(22–16)	Jeřábková 10	Elektromos hall, Budapest; Attendance: 350; Referees: Felhő, Öcsi
Round 16; 15 February 2020; 18:00	3× (yellow card) 3× (suspension)	Report	2× (yellow card) 2× (suspension)	Elektromos hall, Budapest; Attendance: 350; Referees: Felhő, Öcsi

Round 17; 22 February 2020; 18:00	Érd	39–24	Motherson-Mosonmagyaróvár	Érd Aréna, Érd; Attendance: 400; Referees: Marton, Szabó
Round 17; 22 February 2020; 18:00	do Nascimento 9	(17–15)	Tilinger 7	Érd Aréna, Érd; Attendance: 400; Referees: Marton, Szabó
Round 17; 22 February 2020; 18:00	1× (yellow card) 7× (suspension) 1× (red card)	Report	1× (yellow card) 4× (suspension)	Érd Aréna, Érd; Attendance: 400; Referees: Marton, Szabó

Round 18; 6 March 2020; 15:00	DVSC Schaeffler	33–29	Érd	Imre Hódos Sports Hall, Debrecen; Attendance: 1,200; Referees: Bócz, Wiedemann
Round 18; 6 March 2020; 15:00	Despotović 10	(14–12)	three players 7	Imre Hódos Sports Hall, Debrecen; Attendance: 1,200; Referees: Bócz, Wiedemann
Round 18; 6 March 2020; 15:00	2× (yellow card) 5× (suspension)	Report	1× (yellow card) 4× (suspension)	Imre Hódos Sports Hall, Debrecen; Attendance: 1,200; Referees: Bócz, Wiedemann

==== Results overview ====
Opposition	Home score	Away score	Double
Alba Fehérvár KC	35–25	3 May	-
EUbility Group-Békéscsaba	36–29	23 May	-
DVSC Schaeffler	29–33	33–29	58-66
Dunaújvárosi Kohász KA	26–28	25–26	52-53
FTC-Rail Cargo Hungaria	28–31	33–32	60-64
Győri Audi ETO KC	14 Mar	39–28	-
Kisvárda Master Good SE	12 Apr	27–29	-
MTK Budapest	36–24	40–35	71-64
Motherson-Mosonmagyaróvár	39–24	22–29	68-46
Siófok KC	27–21	18 Apr	-
Szent István SE	50–23	26 Apr	-
Hungast-Szombathelyi KKA	38–21	4 Apr	-
Váci NKSE	20 May	31–34	-

=== Hungarian Cup ===
==== Matches ====
4th round 29 January 2020; 19:00	Váci NKSE	29–26	Érd	Municipal Sports Hall, Vác; Attendance: 420; Referees: Altmár, Horváth
4th round 29 January 2020; 19:00	Kuczora 8	(16–13)	Tóth 6	Municipal Sports Hall, Vác; Attendance: 420; Referees: Altmár, Horváth
4th round 29 January 2020; 19:00	1× (yellow card) 2× (suspension)	Report	2× (yellow card) 4× (suspension)	Municipal Sports Hall, Vác; Attendance: 420; Referees: Altmár, Horváth

=== EHF Cup ===
==== Third qualifying round ====
10 November 2019; 15:00	Érd HC	39–32	(Russia) Kuban Krasnodar	Érd Aréna, Érd; Attendance: 1,650; Referees: Lončar, Lončar (CRO)
10 November 2019; 15:00	do Nascimento 6	(21–17)	Frolova 9	Érd Aréna, Érd; Attendance: 1,650; Referees: Lončar, Lončar (CRO)
10 November 2019; 15:00	3× (suspension)	Report	4× (suspension)	Érd Aréna, Érd; Attendance: 1,650; Referees: Lončar, Lončar (CRO)

15 November 2019; 16:30 (18:30 MSK)	Kuban Krasnodar (Russia)	30–25	Érd HC	Basket Arena, Krasnodar; Attendance: 500; Referees: Antić, Jakovljević (SRB)
15 November 2019; 16:30 (18:30 MSK)	Frolova 8	(19–13)	Kovačević, Jeřábková 6	Basket Arena, Krasnodar; Attendance: 500; Referees: Antić, Jakovljević (SRB)
15 November 2019; 16:30 (18:30 MSK)	1× (yellow card)	Report	3× (yellow card) 1× (suspension)	Basket Arena, Krasnodar; Attendance: 500; Referees: Antić, Jakovljević (SRB)

Érd HC won, 64–62 on aggregate.

==== Group stage ====
Pos	Team	Pld	W	D	L	GF	GA	GD	Pts	Qualification	ODE	GLO	ERD	LUB
1	(Denmark) Odense Håndbold	6	5	0	1	175	133	+42	10	Knockout stage	—	25–19	31–24	35–18
2	(Romania) CS Gloria 2018 Bistrița-Năsăud	6	2	3	1	141	139	+2	7	Knockout stage	25–23	—	25–25	26–20
3	(Hungary) Érd HC	6	2	2	2	158	155	+3	6		27–28	24–24	—	29–24
4	(Poland) MKS Perła Lublin	6	0	1	5	127	174	−47	1		20–33	22–22	23–29	—

Source: EHF
Rules for classification: Tiebreakers

===== Matches =====
4 January 2020; 18:00	Érd HC	27–28	(Denmark) Odense Håndbold	Érd Aréna, Érd; Attendance: 2,400; Referees: Lindenbaum, Laron (ISR)
4 January 2020; 18:00	Kovačević 7	(12–12)	Groot 6	Érd Aréna, Érd; Attendance: 2,400; Referees: Lindenbaum, Laron (ISR)
4 January 2020; 18:00	1× (yellow card) 1× (suspension)	Report	1× (yellow card) 4× (suspension)	Érd Aréna, Érd; Attendance: 2,400; Referees: Lindenbaum, Laron (ISR)

11 January 2020; 17:00 (18:00 EET)	CS Gloria 2018 Bistrița-Năsăud (Romania)	25–25	Érd HC	Sala Polivalentă, Bistrița; Attendance: 970; Referees: Smailagic, Smailagic (SWE)
11 January 2020; 17:00 (18:00 EET)	Dincă 7	(15–11)	do Nascimento, Jeřábková 6	Sala Polivalentă, Bistrița; Attendance: 970; Referees: Smailagic, Smailagic (SWE)
11 January 2020; 17:00 (18:00 EET)	2× (yellow card) 2× (suspension)	Report	2× (yellow card) 3× (suspension)	Sala Polivalentă, Bistrița; Attendance: 970; Referees: Smailagic, Smailagic (SWE)

18 January 2020; 19:00	Érd HC	29–24	(Poland) MKS Perła Lublin	Érd Aréna, Érd; Attendance: 2,200; Referees: Panayides, Andreou (CYP)
18 January 2020; 19:00	Jeřábková 7	(18–12)	Kochaniak 6	Érd Aréna, Érd; Attendance: 2,200; Referees: Panayides, Andreou (CYP)
18 January 2020; 19:00	3× (yellow card) 3× (suspension)	Report	2× (yellow card) 1× (suspension)	Érd Aréna, Érd; Attendance: 2,200; Referees: Panayides, Andreou (CYP)

26 January 2020; 17:00	MKS Perła Lublin (Poland)	23–29	Érd HC	Globus Hall, Lublin; Attendance: 1,400; Referees: Capoccia, Jucker (SUI)
26 January 2020; 17:00	Kochaniak 7	(12–14)	do Nascimento 8	Globus Hall, Lublin; Attendance: 1,400; Referees: Capoccia, Jucker (SUI)
26 January 2020; 17:00	1× (yellow card) 3× (suspension)	Report	3× (yellow card) 2× (suspension)	Globus Hall, Lublin; Attendance: 1,400; Referees: Capoccia, Jucker (SUI)

1 February 2020; 15:00	Odense Håndbold (Denmark)	31–24	Érd HC	Odense Idrætshal, Odense; Referees: Lončar, Lončar (CRO)
1 February 2020; 15:00	three players 6	(16–9)	Tóth 6	Odense Idrætshal, Odense; Referees: Lončar, Lončar (CRO)
1 February 2020; 15:00	1× (yellow card) 1× (suspension)	Report	1× (yellow card) 1× (suspension)	Odense Idrætshal, Odense; Referees: Lončar, Lončar (CRO)

9 February 2020; 17:00	Érd HC	24–24	(Romania) CS Gloria 2018 Bistrița-Năsăud	Érd Aréna, Érd; Attendance: 2,200; Referees: Christidi, Papamattheou (GRE)
9 February 2020; 17:00	Kovačević 6	(12–12)	Rațiu 6	Érd Aréna, Érd; Attendance: 2,200; Referees: Christidi, Papamattheou (GRE)
9 February 2020; 17:00	2× (yellow card) 4× (suspension)	Report	3× (yellow card) 5× (suspension)	Érd Aréna, Érd; Attendance: 2,200; Referees: Christidi, Papamattheou (GRE)

===== Results overview =====
Opposition	Home score	Away score	Double
(Poland) MKS Perła Lublin	29–24	23–29	58-47
(Romania) CS Gloria 2018 Bistrița-Năsăud	24–24	25–25	49-49
(Denmark) Odense Håndbold	27–28	31–24	51-59

== Statistics ==
=== Top scorers ===
Includes all competitive matches. The list is sorted by shirt number when total goals are equal.

Last updated on 30 January 2020

Position	Nation	No.	Name	Hungarian League	Hungarian Cup	EHF Cup	Total
1	(Brazil)	3	Alexandra do Nascimento	68	0	42	110
2	(Hungary)	96	Gabriella Tóth	75	6	28	109
3	(Czech Republic)	51	Markéta Jeřábková	60	3	39	102
4	(Hungary)	23	Nikolett Kiss	36	2	30	68
5	(Serbia)	24	Jovana Kovačević	35	2	25	62
6	(Hungary)	8	Laura Szabó	44	4	14	62
7	(Slovakia)	91	Réka Bíziková	37	0	7	44
8	(Serbia)	9	Jelena Lavko	29	1	13	43
9	(Hungary)	53	Natalie Schatzl	28	2	11	41
10	(Hungary)	14	Anett Kisfaludy	27	0	11	38
11	(Hungary)	43	Rita Termány	13	2	0	15
12	(Hungary)	32	Réka Király	4	4	1	9
13	(Hungary)	6	Armilla Simon	1	0	0	1
14	(Hungary)	13	Kinga Janurik	0	0	1	1
			TOTALS	457	26	222	657

=== Attendances ===
List of the home matches:

Round	Against	Attadance	Capatility	Date
NB I- 1.	FTC-Rail Cargo Hungaria	2,000	90,9%	August 31, 2019
NB I- 3.	MTK Budapest	750	34,1%	September 14, 2019
NB I- 9.	Siófok KC	1,800	81,1%	October 5, 2019
NB I- 5.	DVSC Schaeffler	1,100	50,0%	October 9, 2019
NB I- 10.	Szent István SE	800	36,4%	October 20, 2019
NB I- 7.	Szombathelyi KKA	900	40,9%	October 26, 2019
EHF-QR3	Kuban Krasnodar (Russia)	1,650	75,0%	November 10, 2019
NB I- 11.	Alba Fehévár KC	1,500	68,2%	December 29, 2019
EHF-(GS) 1.	Odense Håndbold (Denmark)	2,400	100,0%	January 4, 2020
NB I- 13.	EUbility Group-Békéscsaba	1,500	68,2%	January 15, 2020
EHF-(GS) 3.	MKS Perła Lublin (Poland)	2,200	100,0%	January 18, 2020
NB I- 15.	Dunaújvárosi Kohász KA	1,300	59,0%	February 5, 2020
EHF-(GS) 6.	CS Gloria 2018 Bistrița-Năsăud (Romania)	2,200	100,0%	February 9, 2020
NB I- 17.	Motherson-Mosonmagyaróvár	400	18,2%	February 22, 2020
NB I- 19.	Győri Audi ETO KC		%	March 14, 2020
NB I- 21.	Kisvárda Master Good SE		%	April 12, 2020
