= 2019–20 Debreceni VSC (women's handball) season =

DVSC Schaeffler sports season

Debreceni VSC
2019–20 season
- Chairman: Zsolt Ábrók
- Manager: Vilmos Köstner
Home colours	Away colours

The 2019–20 season was Debreceni VSC's 36th competitive and consecutive season in the Nemzeti Bajnokság I and the 71st year in existence as a handball club.

== Players ==
=== Squad information ===
Goalkeepers

- 16 (Hungary) Ágnes Triffa
- 61 (Hungary) Dóra Szabó
- 90 (Hungary) (Slovakia) Viktória Oguntoye

Left Wingers

- 17 (Hungary) Éva Vantara-Kelemen (c)
- 47 (Hungary) Panna Szabó

Right Wingers

- 6 (Hungary) Nóra Varsányi
- 72 (Hungary) Rebeka Arany

Line players

- 13 (Hungary) Petra Tóvizi
- 18 (Hungary) Réka Bordás

Left Backs

- 20 (Hungary) Anita Bulath
- 80 (Montenegro) Jelena Despotović

Centre Backs

- 22 (Argentina) Elke Karsten
- 38 (Hungary) Petra Vámos
- 49 (Hungary) Panna Borgyos

Right Backs

- 33 (Hungary) Anna Kovács
- 77 (Hungary) Szabina Karnik

=== Transfers ===
Source: hetmeteres.hu

In:

- Szabina Karnik (from MTK Budapest)
- (Argentina) Elke Karsten (from (Spain) Bera Bera)
- Petra Vámos (from NEKA)

Out:

- (Denmark) Lotte Grigel (to (France) Nantes)
- (Russia) Anna Punko (temporarily pauses her career)
- (Romania) Mădălina Zamfirescu (to (Romania) SCM Râmnicu Vâlcea)

== Club ==
=== Technical Staff ===
Position	Staff member
President	(Hungary) Zsolt Ábrók
Head coach	(Hungary) Vilmos Köstner
Assistant coaches	(Hungary) Gergő Vida
Goalkeeping coach	(Slovenia) Grega Karpan
Team doctor	(Hungary) Dr. Tamás Bazsó
Masseur	(Hungary) Attila Kazsimér
Conditioning coach	(Hungary) Tibor Horváth

Source: Coaches, Management

=== Uniform ===
- Supplier: Adidas
- Main sponsor: Schaeffler / tippmix / Globus / City of Debrecen
- Back sponsor: Cívis Ház / RISKA / Volkswagen
- Shorts sponsor: Bútor Outler / SzertárSport

== Competitions ==
=== Overview ===
Win Draw Loss

Competition	First match	Last match	Starting round	Final position	Record							
Competition	First match	Last match	Starting round	Final position	Pld	W	D	L	GF	GA	GD	Win %
Nemzeti Bajnokság I	31 August 2019	23 May 2020	Matchday 1	Matchday 26	14	8	3	3	432	400	+32	57.14
Magyar Kupa	28 January 2020	-	Fourth round	-	1	1	0	0	39	23	+16	100.00
EHF Cup	12 October 2019	9 February 2020	Second qualifying round	Group stage	10	5	0	5	312	283	+29	50.00
Total					25	14	3	8	783	706	+77	56.00

Last updated: 29 January 2020
Source: Competitions

=== Nemzeti Bajnokság I ===
==== League table ====
Pos	Team	Pld	W	D	L	GF	GA	GD	Pts
2	Siófok KC	18	15	1	2	608	427	+181	31
3	FTC-Rail Cargo Hungaria	18	13	3	2	579	454	+125	29
4	DVSC SCHAEFFLER	18	11	3	4	560	514	+46	25
5	Váci NKSE	19	11	2	6	559	533	+26	24
6	Érd NK	18	11	0	7	586	509	+77	22

Updated to match(es) played on 21 April 2020. Source: mksz.hu
Rules for classification: 1) Points; 2) Goal difference; 3) Head-to-head points; 4) Head-to-head goal difference; 5) Goals scored; 6) Matches won; 7) Draw (Note: Head-to-head record is used only after all the matches between the teams in question have been played)

==== Results by round ====
Match	1	2	3	4	5	6	7	8	9	10	11	12	13	14	15	16	17	18	19	20	21	22	23	24	25	26
Ground	A	H	A	A	H	A	H	A	H	A	H	A	H	H	A	H	A	H	H	A	H	H	A	A	H	A
Result	W	W	D	W	W	W	D	L	W	L	W	D	L	W	W	L	W	W								

Updated to match(es) played on 5 February 2020. Source: Matches
A = Away; H = Home; W = Win; D = Draw; L = Loss

==== Matches ====
Round 1; 29 August 2019; 18:00	Szent István SE	24–33	DVSC Schaeffler	Municipal Sports Hall, Monor; Attendance: 350; Referees: Hantos, Rózsahegyi
Round 1; 29 August 2019; 18:00	Monori 7	(10–17)	Kovács 7	Municipal Sports Hall, Monor; Attendance: 350; Referees: Hantos, Rózsahegyi
Round 1; 29 August 2019; 18:00	1× (yellow card) 5× (suspension)	Report	2× (yellow card) 3× (suspension)	Municipal Sports Hall, Monor; Attendance: 350; Referees: Hantos, Rózsahegyi

Round 2; 4 September 2019; 18:00	DVSC Schaeffler	30–22	Alba Fehérvár KC	Főnix Hall, Debrecen (Note: DVSC Schaeffler played their second home Főnix Hall, because the main home Imre Hódos Sports Hall, Debrecen had been renovated.); Attendance: 2,000; Referees: Hargitai, Markó
Round 2; 4 September 2019; 18:00	Kovács 13	(12–13)	Mendy 11	Főnix Hall, Debrecen; Attendance: 2,000; Referees: Hargitai, Markó
Round 2; 4 September 2019; 18:00	3× (yellow card) 5× (suspension)	Report	2× (yellow card) 5× (suspension)	Főnix Hall, Debrecen; Attendance: 2,000; Referees: Hargitai, Markó

Round 3; 14 September 2019; 18:00	Váci NKSE	26–30	DVSC Schaeffler	Municipal Sports Hall, Vác; Attendance: 480; Referees: Felhő, Öcsi
Round 3; 14 September 2019; 18:00	Lakatos 9	(14–16)	Bulath 7	Municipal Sports Hall, Vác; Attendance: 480; Referees: Felhő, Öcsi
Round 3; 14 September 2019; 18:00	3× (yellow card) 4× (suspension) 1× (red card)	Report	1× (yellow card) 6× (suspension)	Municipal Sports Hall, Vác; Attendance: 480; Referees: Felhő, Öcsi

Round 4; 18 September 2019; 18:00	DVSC Schaeffler	32–30	EUbility Group-Békéscsaba	Főnix Hall, Debrecen; Attendance: 2,700; Referees: Horváth, Marton
Round 4; 18 September 2019; 18:00	Kovács 8	(15–14)	Kopecz 9	Főnix Hall, Debrecen; Attendance: 2,700; Referees: Horváth, Marton
Round 4; 18 September 2019; 18:00	2× (yellow card) 2× (suspension)	Report	2× (yellow card) 5× (suspension)	Főnix Hall, Debrecen; Attendance: 2,700; Referees: Horváth, Marton

Round 5; 9 October 2019; 18:00	Érd	29–33	DVSC Schaeffler	Érd Aréna, Érd; Attendance: 1,100; Referees: Hargitai, Markó
Round 5; 9 October 2019; 18:00	Tóth 6	(13–21)	Kovács 5	Érd Aréna, Érd; Attendance: 1,100; Referees: Hargitai, Markó
Round 5; 9 October 2019; 18:00	3× (yellow card) 5× (suspension)	Report	3× (yellow card) 3× (suspension)	Érd Aréna, Érd; Attendance: 1,100; Referees: Hargitai, Markó

Round 6; 16 October 2019; 18:00	DVSC Schaeffler	24–24	Dunaújvárosi Kohász KA	Imre Hódos Sports Hall, Debrecen; Attendance: 1,400; Referees: Bócz, Wiedemann
Round 6; 16 October 2019; 18:00	Kovács 6	(15–13)	Szekerczés 9	Imre Hódos Sports Hall, Debrecen; Attendance: 1,400; Referees: Bócz, Wiedemann
Round 6; 16 October 2019; 18:00	1× (yellow card) 2× (suspension)	Report	2× (yellow card) 7× (suspension)	Imre Hódos Sports Hall, Debrecen; Attendance: 1,400; Referees: Bócz, Wiedemann

Round 7; 26 October 2019; 18:00	MTK Budapest	36–33	DVSC Schaeffler	Elektromos hall, Budapest; Attendance: 350; Referees: Andorka, Hucker
Round 7; 26 October 2019; 18:00	Pál, Szőlősi-Zácsik 7	(15–13)	Despotović 8	Elektromos hall, Budapest; Attendance: 350; Referees: Andorka, Hucker
Round 7; 26 October 2019; 18:00	2× (yellow card) 6× (suspension) 1× (red card)	Report	1× (yellow card) 3× (suspension) 1× (red card)	Elektromos hall, Budapest; Attendance: 350; Referees: Andorka, Hucker

Round 8; 2 November 2019; 18:00	DVSC Schaeffler	32–26	Motherson-Mosonmagyaróvár	Imre Hódos Sports Hall, Debrecen; Attendance: 1,500; Referees: Földesi, Halász
Round 8; 2 November 2019; 18:00	Bulath 6	(15–13)	Tilinger 8	Imre Hódos Sports Hall, Debrecen; Attendance: 1,500; Referees: Földesi, Halász
Round 8; 2 November 2019; 18:00	2× (yellow card) 7× (suspension)	Report	2× (yellow card) 7× (suspension)	Imre Hódos Sports Hall, Debrecen; Attendance: 1,500; Referees: Földesi, Halász

Round 9; 10 September 2019; 18:00	FTC-Rail Cargo Hungaria	30–30	DVSC Schaeffler	Elek Gyula Aréna, Budapest; Attendance: 1,000; Referees: Bacs, Bóna
Round 9; 10 September 2019; 18:00	Klujber 11	(15–13)	Bulath 7	Elek Gyula Aréna, Budapest; Attendance: 1,000; Referees: Bacs, Bóna
Round 9; 10 September 2019; 18:00	3× (yellow card) 6× (suspension)	Report	2× (yellow card) 6× (suspension)	Elek Gyula Aréna, Budapest; Attendance: 1,000; Referees: Bacs, Bóna

Round 10; 12 November 2019; 18:00	Győri Audi ETO KC	36–28	DVSC Schaeffler	Audi Aréna, Győr; Attendance: 3,479; Referees: Medve, Südi
Round 10; 12 November 2019; 18:00	Oftedal 8	(20–13)	three players 4	Audi Aréna, Győr; Attendance: 3,479; Referees: Medve, Südi
Round 10; 12 November 2019; 18:00	1× (yellow card) 4× (suspension)	Report	1× (yellow card) 2× (suspension)	Audi Aréna, Győr; Attendance: 3,479; Referees: Medve, Südi

Round 11; 29 December 2019; 18:00	DVSC Schaeffler	30–18	Hungast-Szombathelyi KKA	Imre Hódos Sports Hall, Debrecen; Attendance: 1,800; Referees: Őri, Podzena
Round 11; 29 December 2019; 18:00	Varsányi 5	(15–11)	Gorilska 7	Imre Hódos Sports Hall, Debrecen; Attendance: 1,800; Referees: Őri, Podzena
Round 11; 29 December 2019; 18:00	1× (yellow card) 4× (suspension)	Report	2× (yellow card) 3× (suspension)	Imre Hódos Sports Hall, Debrecen; Attendance: 1,800; Referees: Őri, Podzena

Round 12; 8 January 2020; 18:00	Kisvárda Master Good SE	28–28	DVSC Schaeffler	Municipal Sports Hall, Kisvárda; Attendance: 980; Referees: Horváth, Marton
Round 12; 8 January 2020; 18:00	Habánková 8	(13–14)	Bulath, Kovács 8	Municipal Sports Hall, Kisvárda; Attendance: 980; Referees: Horváth, Marton
Round 12; 8 January 2020; 18:00	2× (yellow card) 5× (suspension)	Report	2× (yellow card) 4× (suspension)	Municipal Sports Hall, Kisvárda; Attendance: 980; Referees: Horváth, Marton

Round 13; 15 January 2020; 18:00	DVSC Schaeffler	30–39	Siófok KC	Imre Hódos Sports Hall, Debrecen; Attendance: 1,400; Referees: Bócz, Wiedemann
Round 13; 15 January 2020; 18:00	Karsten 6	(14–18)	Drabik 6	Imre Hódos Sports Hall, Debrecen; Attendance: 1,400; Referees: Bócz, Wiedemann
Round 13; 15 January 2020; 18:00	2× (yellow card) 3× (suspension)	Report	1× (yellow card) 4× (suspension)	Imre Hódos Sports Hall, Debrecen; Attendance: 1,400; Referees: Bócz, Wiedemann

Round 14; 22 January 2020; 18:00	DVSC Schaeffler	39–32	Szent István SE	Imre Hódos Sports Hall, Debrecen; Attendance: 500; Referees: Ignéczi, Kavalecz
Round 14; 22 January 2020; 18:00	Vámos 5	(18–13)	Aron 7	Imre Hódos Sports Hall, Debrecen; Attendance: 500; Referees: Ignéczi, Kavalecz
Round 14; 22 January 2020; 18:00	3× (yellow card) 2× (suspension)	Report	7× (suspension) 1× (red card)	Imre Hódos Sports Hall, Debrecen; Attendance: 500; Referees: Ignéczi, Kavalecz

Round 15; 5 February 2020; 18:00	Alba Fehérvár KC	30–33	DVSC Schaeffler	KÖFÉM Sports Hall, Székesfehérvár; Attendance: 600; Referees: Felhő, Öcsi
Round 15; 5 February 2020; 18:00	Mendy 9	(11–14)	Bordás 7	KÖFÉM Sports Hall, Székesfehérvár; Attendance: 600; Referees: Felhő, Öcsi
Round 15; 5 February 2020; 18:00	1× (yellow card) 4× (suspension)	Report	3× (yellow card) 5× (suspension)	KÖFÉM Sports Hall, Székesfehérvár; Attendance: 600; Referees: Felhő, Öcsi

Round 16; 15 February 2020; 15:00	DVSC Schaeffler	29–30	Váci NKSE	Imre Hódos Sports Hall, Debrecen; Attendance: 1,300; Referees: Hargitai, Markó
Round 16; 15 February 2020; 15:00	Kovács 13	(13–15)	Kácsor 8	Imre Hódos Sports Hall, Debrecen; Attendance: 1,300; Referees: Hargitai, Markó
Round 16; 15 February 2020; 15:00	1× (yellow card) 2× (suspension)	Report	1× (yellow card) 7× (suspension)	Imre Hódos Sports Hall, Debrecen; Attendance: 1,300; Referees: Hargitai, Markó

Round 17; 22 February 2020; 18:00	EUbility Group-Békéscsaba	25–33	DVSC Schaeffler	Municipal Sports Hall, Békéscsaba; Attendance: 0 (Note: This match played without spectators, because the home hall Municipal Sports Hall, Békéscsaba had been renovated.); Referees: Paska, Vastag
Round 17; 22 February 2020; 18:00	Marincsák 8	(10–15)	Bulath 6	Municipal Sports Hall, Békéscsaba; Attendance: 0 Referees: Paska, Vastag
Round 17; 22 February 2020; 18:00	1× (yellow card) 6× (suspension)	Report	1× (yellow card) 3× (suspension)	Municipal Sports Hall, Békéscsaba; Attendance: 0 Referees: Paska, Vastag

Round 18; 6 March 2020; 15:00	DVSC Schaeffler	33–29	Érd	Imre Hódos Sports Hall, Debrecen; Attendance: 1,200; Referees: Bócz, Wiedemann
Round 18; 6 March 2020; 15:00	Despotović 10	(14–12)	three players 7	Imre Hódos Sports Hall, Debrecen; Attendance: 1,200; Referees: Bócz, Wiedemann
Round 18; 6 March 2020; 15:00	2× (yellow card) 5× (suspension)	Report	1× (yellow card) 4× (suspension)	Imre Hódos Sports Hall, Debrecen; Attendance: 1,200; Referees: Bócz, Wiedemann

==== Results overview ====
All results are indicated from the perspective of DVSC Schaeffler.
We indicate in parentheses the number of round.
Win Draw Loss Postponed

Opposition	Home score	Away score	Aggregate score	Double
Alba Fehérvár KC	30–22	33–30	63-52	Yes
EUbility Group-Békéscsaba	32–30	33–25	65-55	Yes
Dunaújvárosi Kohász KA	24–24	13 Mar	24-24	No
Érd	33–29	33–29	66-58	Yes
FTC-Rail Cargo Hungaria	18 Apr	30–30	30-30	No
Győri Audi ETO KC	24 Apr	28–36	28-36	No
Kisvárda Master Good SE	20 May	28–28	28-28	No
MTK Budapest	3 Apr	33–36	33-36	No
Motherson-Mosonmagyaróvár	32–26	10 Apr	32-26	
Siófok KC	30–39	23 May	30-39	No
Szent István SE	39–32	33–24	72-56	Yes
Hungast-Szombathelyi KKA	30–18	2 May	30-18	
Váci NKSE	29–30	30–26	59-56	No

=== Hungarian Cup ===
==== Matches ====
4th round 28 January 2020; 18:00	Hungast-Szombathelyi KKA	23–39	DVSC Schaeffler	UFM Aréna, Mosonmagyaróvár; Referees: Andorka, Hucker
4th round 28 January 2020; 18:00	Pődör 5	(12–19)	Varsányi 6	UFM Aréna, Mosonmagyaróvár; Referees: Andorka, Hucker
4th round 28 January 2020; 18:00	1× (yellow card) 4× (suspension)	Report	3× (yellow card) 1× (suspension)	UFM Aréna, Mosonmagyaróvár; Referees: Andorka, Hucker

5th round 7 April 2020; 18:00	DVSC Schaeffler	–	FTC-Rail Cargo Hungaria	Imre Hódos Sports Hall, Debrecen
5th round 7 April 2020; 18:00		(–)		Imre Hódos Sports Hall, Debrecen
5th round 7 April 2020; 18:00		Report		Imre Hódos Sports Hall, Debrecen

=== EHF Cup ===
==== Second qualifying round ====
12 October 2019; 19:00	DVSC Schaeffler	35–27	(Germany) TSV Bayer 04-Werkselfen	Imre Hódos Sports Hall, Debrecen; Attendance: 1,800; Referees: Antashev, Musatov (RUS)
12 October 2019; 19:00	Bulath 7	(16–15)	Huber 6	Imre Hódos Sports Hall, Debrecen; Attendance: 1,800; Referees: Antashev, Musatov (RUS)
12 October 2019; 19:00	1× (yellow card) 5× (suspension) 1× (red card)	Report	4× (suspension)	Imre Hódos Sports Hall, Debrecen; Attendance: 1,800; Referees: Antashev, Musatov (RUS)

20 October 2019; 16:00	TSV Bayer 04-Werkselfen (Germany)	31–34	DVSC Schaeffler	Ostermann-Arena, Leverkusen; Attendance: 750; Referees: Hofer, Schmidhuber (AUT)
20 October 2019; 16:00	Huber 5	(16–15)	Kovács, Bulath 5	Ostermann-Arena, Leverkusen; Attendance: 750; Referees: Hofer, Schmidhuber (AUT)
20 October 2019; 16:00	2× (yellow card) 4× (suspension)	Report	3× (yellow card) 3× (suspension)	Ostermann-Arena, Leverkusen; Attendance: 750; Referees: Hofer, Schmidhuber (AUT)

DVSC Schaeffler won, 69–58 on aggregate.

==== Third qualifying round ====
9 November 2019; 15:30	DVSC Schaeffler	37–26	(Serbia) ŽORK Jagodina	Imre Hódos Sports Hall, Debrecen; Attendance: 1,800; Referees: Pirvu, Potirniche (ROU)
9 November 2019; 15:30	Kovács 8	(17–13)	Tatar 7	Imre Hódos Sports Hall, Debrecen; Attendance: 1,800; Referees: Pirvu, Potirniche (ROU)
9 November 2019; 15:30	3× (yellow card) 5× (suspension)	Report	2× (yellow card) 6× (suspension)	Imre Hódos Sports Hall, Debrecen; Attendance: 1,800; Referees: Pirvu, Potirniche (ROU)

15 November 2019; 19:00	ŽORK Jagodina (Serbia)	26–36	DVSC Schaeffler	JASSA Sports Center, Jagodina; Attendance: 600; Referees: Smailagic, Smailagic (SWE)
15 November 2019; 19:00	Agbaba 14	(12–20)	Arany 7	JASSA Sports Center, Jagodina; Attendance: 600; Referees: Smailagic, Smailagic (SWE)
15 November 2019; 19:00	2× (yellow card) 3× (suspension)	Report	1× (yellow card) 4× (suspension)	JASSA Sports Center, Jagodina; Attendance: 600; Referees: Smailagic, Smailagic (SWE)

DVSC Schaeffler won, 73–52 on aggregate.

==== Group stage ====
Pos	Team	Pld	W	D	L	GF	GA	GD	Pts	Qualification	THU	KAS	SCH	BAN
1	(Germany) Thüringer HC	6	6	0	0	184	141	+43	12	Knockout stage	—	27–24	26–23	40–24
2	(Turkey) Kastamonu Bld. GSK	6	3	0	3	176	175	+1	6 (Note: Kastamonu Bld. GSK 64–63 DVSC Schaeffler)	Knockout stage	24–30	—	30–31	33–27
3	(Hungary) DVSC Schaeffler	6	3	0	3	170	173	−3	6		19–26	32–34	—	36–29
4	(Czech Republic) DHK Baník Most	6	0	0	6	163	204	−41	0		27–35	28–31	28–29	—

Source: EHF
Rules for classification: Tiebreakers

===== Matches =====
4 January 2020; 13:00 (15:00 TRT)	Kastamonu GSK (Turkey)	30–31	DVSC Schaeffler	Atatürk Sports Hall, Kastamonu; Attendance: 1,500; Referees: Manea, Iliescu (ROU)
4 January 2020; 13:00 (15:00 TRT)	İskit, Özel 8	(17–15)	Arany 9	Atatürk Sports Hall, Kastamonu; Attendance: 1,500; Referees: Manea, Iliescu (ROU)
4 January 2020; 13:00 (15:00 TRT)	1× (yellow card) 3× (suspension)	Report	3× (yellow card) 3× (suspension)	Atatürk Sports Hall, Kastamonu; Attendance: 1,500; Referees: Manea, Iliescu (ROU)

11 January 2020; 14:00	DVSC Schaeffler	36–29	(Czech Republic) DHK Baník Most	Imre Hódos Sports Hall, Debrecen; Attendance: 1,800; Referees: Carmaux, Mursch (FRA)
11 January 2020; 14:00	Bulath, Karnik 5	(14–14)	Šustková 6	Imre Hódos Sports Hall, Debrecen; Attendance: 1,800; Referees: Carmaux, Mursch (FRA)
11 January 2020; 14:00	2× (yellow card) 4× (suspension)	Report	6× (suspension)	Imre Hódos Sports Hall, Debrecen; Attendance: 1,800; Referees: Carmaux, Mursch (FRA)

18 January 2020; 15:00	DVSC Schaeffler	19–26	(Germany) Thüringer HC	Imre Hódos Sports Hall, Debrecen; Attendance: 1,800; Referees: Braseth, Sundet (NOR)
18 January 2020; 15:00	Bulath 4	(7–12)	Scheffknecht 8	Imre Hódos Sports Hall, Debrecen; Attendance: 1,800; Referees: Braseth, Sundet (NOR)
18 January 2020; 15:00	2× (yellow card) 2× (suspension)	Report	1× (yellow card) 3× (suspension)	Imre Hódos Sports Hall, Debrecen; Attendance: 1,800; Referees: Braseth, Sundet (NOR)

26 January 2020; 14:00	Thüringer HC (Germany)	26–23	DVSC Schaeffler	Wiedigsburghalle, Nordhausen; Attendance: 1,500; Referees: Barysas, Petrušis (LTU)
26 January 2020; 14:00	Scheffknecht 9	(15–13)	Bulath 7	Wiedigsburghalle, Nordhausen; Attendance: 1,500; Referees: Barysas, Petrušis (LTU)
26 January 2020; 14:00	1× (yellow card) 2× (suspension)	Report	2× (yellow card) 2× (suspension)	Wiedigsburghalle, Nordhausen; Attendance: 1,500; Referees: Barysas, Petrušis (LTU)

1 February 2020; 15:00	DVSC Schaeffler	32–34	(Turkey) Kastamonu GSK	Imre Hódos Sports Hall, Debrecen; Attendance: 1,800; Referees: Ershov, Pavliukov (RUS)
1 February 2020; 15:00	Despotović 8	(20–20)	Coşkun, İskenderoğlu 7	Imre Hódos Sports Hall, Debrecen; Attendance: 1,800; Referees: Ershov, Pavliukov (RUS)
1 February 2020; 15:00	3× (yellow card) 3× (suspension)	Report	3× (yellow card) 6× (suspension)	Imre Hódos Sports Hall, Debrecen; Attendance: 1,800; Referees: Ershov, Pavliukov (RUS)

9 February 2020; 19:00	DHK Baník Most (Czech Republic)	28–29	DVSC Schaeffler	Sportovní hala, Most; Attendance: 800; Referees: Ivanović, Vujišić (MNE)
9 February 2020; 19:00	Šustková 8	(12–14)	Despotović 7	Sportovní hala, Most; Attendance: 800; Referees: Ivanović, Vujišić (MNE)
9 February 2020; 19:00	1× (yellow card) 8× (suspension)	Report	2× (yellow card) 9× (suspension) 2× (red card)	Sportovní hala, Most; Attendance: 800; Referees: Ivanović, Vujišić (MNE)

===== Results overview =====
Opposition	Home score	Away score	Double
(Czech Republic) DHK Baník Most	36–29	28–29	65-57
(Turkey) Kastamonu GSK	32–34	30–31	63-64
(Germany) Thüringer HC	19–26	26–23	42-52

== Statistics ==
=== Top scorers ===
Includes all competitive matches. The list is sorted by shirt number when total goals are equal.

Last updated on 29 January 2020

Position	Nation	No.	Name	Hungarian League	Hungarian Cup	EHF Cup	Total
1	(Hungary)	33	Anna Kovács	73	4	42	108
2	(Hungary)	20	Anita Bulath	66	0	40	94
3	(Hungary)	17	Éva Vantara-Kelemen	47	1	18	63
4	(Montenegro)	80	Jelena Despotović	43	0	22	56
5	(Argentina)	22	Elke Karsten	31	3	20	49
6	(Hungary)	72	Rebeka Arany	21	3	28	49
7	(Hungary)	13	Petra Tóvizi	26	3	13	39
8	(Hungary)	38	Petra Vámos	33	0	11	39
9	(Hungary)	18	Réka Bordás	26	3	10	33
10	(Hungary)	6	Nóra Varsányi	19	6	8	29
11	(Hungary)	77	Szabina Karnik	16	4	12	28
12	(Hungary)	49	Panna Borgyos	7	3	9	19
13	(Hungary)	8	Luca Poczetnyik	7	4	7	17
14	(Hungary)	14	Panna Vámosi	7	2	3	12
15	(Hungary)	47	Panna Szabó	4	2	4	9
16	(Hungary)	71	Mirtill Petrus	6	0	4	8
17	(Slovakia)	90	Viktória Oguntoye	0	1	0	1
			TOTALS	432	39	251	722

=== Attendances ===
List of the home matches:

Round	Against	Attadance	Capatility	Date
NB I- 2.	Alba Fehévár KC	2,000	30,8%	September 4, 2019
NB I- 4.	EUbility Group-Békéscsaba	2,700	41,5%	September 18, 2019
EHF-QR2	TSV Bayer 04-Werkselfen (Germany)	1,800	100,0%	October 12, 2019
NB I- 6.	Dunaújvárosi Kohász KA	1,400	77,8%	October 16, 2019
NB I- 8.	Motherson-Mosonmagyaróvár	1,500	83,3%	November 2, 2019
EHF-QR3	ŽORK Jagodina (Serbia)	1,800	100,0%	November 9, 2019
NB I- 11.	Szombathelyi KKA	1,800	100,0%	December 29, 2019
EHF-(GS) 2.	DHK Baník Most (Czech Republic)	1,800	100,0%	January 11, 2020
NB I- 13.	Siófok KC	1,400	77,8%	January 15, 2020
EHF-(GS) 3.	Thüringer HC (Germany)	1,800	100,0%	January 18, 2020
NB I- 14.	Szent István SE	500	27,8%	January 22, 2020
EHF-(GS) 5.	Kastamonu GSK (Turkey)	1,800	100,0%	February 1, 2020
NB I- 16.	Váci NKSE	1,300	72,2%	February 15, 2020
NB I- 18.	Érd	1,200	66,7%	March 6, 2020
NB I- 20.	MTK Budapest		%	April 3, 2020
MK- 5th	FTC-Rail Cargo Hungaria		%	April 7, 2020
