= 2019–20 Ferencvárosi TC (women's handball) season =

Ferencvárosi TC
2019–20 season
- Chairman: Zsolt Ákos Jeney
- Manager: Gábor Elek
Home colours	Away colours

The 2019–20 season will be Ferencvárosi TC's 62nd competitive and consecutive season in the Nemzeti Bajnokság I and 70th year in existence as a handball club.

== Players ==
=== Squad information ===
Goalkeepers

- 16 (Hungary) Blanka Bíró
- 31 (Hungary) Zsófi Szemerey

Left Wingers

- 6 (Hungary) Nadine Schatzl
- 21 (Hungary) Gréta Márton
- 27 (Hungary) Luca Háfra

Right Wingers

- 22 (Hungary) Viktória Lukács
- 28 (Hungary) Kíra Bánfai

Line players

- 2 (Hungary) Noémi Pásztor
- 11 (Hungary) Lívia Nagy
- 24 (Netherlands) Danick Snelder

Left Backs

- 10 (Hungary) Klára Csiszár-Szekeres
- 15 (Hungary) Kinga Debreczeni-Klivinyi
- 45 (Hungary) Noémi Háfra
- 92 (Hungary) Dóra Hornyák

Centre Backs

- 8 (Hungary) Zita Szucsánszki
- 17 (Norway) Emilie Christensen
- 33 (Hungary) Nikolett Tóth
- 91 (Hungary) Anikó Kovacsics (c)

Right Backs

- 42 (Hungary) Katrin Klujber

=== Transfers ===
Source: hetmeteres.hu

In:

- Kíra Bánfai (loan from MTK Budapest)
- (Norway) Emilie Christensen (from (Norway) Larvik)
- Dóra Hornyák (returned after pregnancy)
- Katrin Klujber (from Dunaújváros)
- Noémi Pásztor (from Budaörs)
- Zita Szucsánszki (returned after pregnancy)

Out:

- Dorottya Faluvégi (to Győri ETO)
- Kata Farkas (to Békéscsaba)
- Gréta Hadfi (loan to Vác)
- Dóra Horváth (to Kisvárda)
- (Montenegro) Bobana Klikovac (to (Romania) SCM Craiova)
- (Montenegro) Djurdjina Malović (loan to MTK Budapest)
- (Spain) Nerea Pena (to Siófok)
- Sára Suba (loan to MTK Budapest)
- Melinda Szikora (to Siófok)
- Rea Mészáros (loan to Vác as of December 2019)

== Club ==
=== Technical Staff ===
Position	Staff member
President (handball section)	(Hungary) Zsolt Ákos Jeney
President (the club)	(Hungary) Gábor Kubatov
Technical manager	(Hungary) György Szász
Head coach	(Hungary) Gábor Elek
Assistant coach	(Hungary) Attila Kovács
Goalkeeping coach	(Hungary) Norbert Duleba
Team doctor	(Hungary) Dr. Attila Pavlik
Masseur	(Hungary) Péter Pais
Physiotherapist	(Hungary) Dorottya Vajay-Gazsó
Conditioning coach	(Norway) Tord Ellingsen

Source: Coaches, Staff

=== Uniform ===
- Supplier: Nike
- Main sponsor: Rail Cargo Hungaria / tippmix / Lidl / City of Budapest
- Back sponsor: Budapest Spas / My drone space / NKM
- Shorts sponsor: FCsM / Neckermann

== Competitions ==
=== Overview ===
Win Draw Loss

Competition	First match	Last match	Starting round	Final position	Record							
Competition	First match	Last match	Starting round	Final position	Pld	W	D	L	GF	GA	GD	Win %
Nemzeti Bajnokság I	31 August 2019	23 May 2020	Matchday 1	Matchday 26	10	7	2	1	321	257	+64	70.00
Magyar Kupa	-	-	Fifth round	-					—			
EHF Champions League	5 October 2019	7 March 2020	Group stage	Main round	6	2	1	3	167	180	−13	33.33
Total					16	9	3	4	488	437	+51	56.25

Last updated: 3 January 2020
Source: Competitions

=== Nemzeti Bajnokság I ===
Pos	Team	Pld	W	D	L	GF	GA	GD	Pts
1	Győri Audi ETO KC	20	19	0	1	713	483	+230	38
2	Siófok KC	18	15	1	2	608	427	+181	31
3	FTC-Rail Cargo Hungaria	18	13	3	2	579	454	+125	29
4	DVSC SCHAEFFLER	18	11	3	4	560	514	+46	25
5	Váci NKSE	19	11	2	6	559	533	+26	24

Updated to match(es) played on 21 April 2020. Source: mksz.hu
Rules for classification: 1) Points; 2) Goal difference; 3) Head-to-head points; 4) Head-to-head goal difference; 5) Goals scored; 6) Matches won; 7) Draw (Note: Head-to-head record is used only after all the matches between the teams in question have been played)

==== Results by round ====
Match	1	2	3	4	5	6	7	8	9	10	11	12	13	14	15	16	17	18	19	20	21	22	23	24	25	26
Ground	A	H	H	H	H	A	A	H	A	H	A	A	A	A	H	H	A	H	H	A	H	A	H	A	H	A
Result	W	W	W	D	W	D	W	W	W	L	W	D	W	W	W	W	W	L								

Updated to match(es) played on 5 February 2020. Source: Matches
A = Away; H = Home; W = Win; D = Draw; L = Loss

==== Matches ====
Round 1; 31 August 2019; 17:15	Érd	28–31	FTC-Rail Cargo Hungaria	Érd Aréna, Érd; Attendance: 2,000; Referees: Andorka, Hucker
Round 1; 31 August 2019; 17:15	three players 6	(12–17)	Háfra 10	Érd Aréna, Érd; Attendance: 2,000; Referees: Andorka, Hucker
Round 1; 31 August 2019; 17:15	2× (yellow card) 1× (suspension)	Report	2× (yellow card) 1× (suspension)	Érd Aréna, Érd; Attendance: 2,000; Referees: Andorka, Hucker

Round 2; 6 September 2019; 18:00	FTC-Rail Cargo Hungaria	30–22	Kisvárda Master Good SE	Elek Gyula Aréna, Budapest; Attendance: 800; Referees: Hantos, Rózsahegyi
Round 2; 6 September 2019; 18:00	Lukács 9	(20–13)	Radojević 10	Elek Gyula Aréna, Budapest; Attendance: 800; Referees: Hantos, Rózsahegyi
Round 2; 6 September 2019; 18:00	2× (yellow card) 2× (suspension)	Report	1× (yellow card) 4× (suspension)	Elek Gyula Aréna, Budapest; Attendance: 800; Referees: Hantos, Rózsahegyi

Round 3; 13 September 2019; 18:00	FTC-Rail Cargo Hungaria	31–23	Dunaújvárosi Kohász KA	Elek Gyula Aréna, Budapest; Attendance: 1,000; Referees: Fekete, Tóth
Round 3; 13 September 2019; 18:00	Kovacsics 8	(13–12)	Szekerczés 4	Elek Gyula Aréna, Budapest; Attendance: 1,000; Referees: Fekete, Tóth
Round 3; 13 September 2019; 18:00	3× (yellow card) 5× (suspension)	Report	1× (yellow card) 9× (suspension)	Elek Gyula Aréna, Budapest; Attendance: 1,000; Referees: Fekete, Tóth

Round 4; 21 September 2019; 17:00	Siófok KC	31–31	FTC-Rail Cargo Hungaria	Szilárd Kiss Sports Hall, Siófok; Attendance: 1,185; Referees: Horváth, Marton
Round 4; 21 September 2019; 17:00	Kobetić 9	(19–18)	Háfra 7	Szilárd Kiss Sports Hall, Siófok; Attendance: 1,185; Referees: Horváth, Marton
Round 4; 21 September 2019; 17:00	2× (yellow card) 1× (suspension) 2× (red card)	Report	2× (yellow card) 5× (suspension) 1× (red card)	Szilárd Kiss Sports Hall, Siófok; Attendance: 1,185; Referees: Horváth, Marton

Round 5; 3 September 2019; 18:00	FTC-Rail Cargo Hungaria	36–22	MTK Budapest	Elek Gyula Aréna, Budapest; Attendance: 800; Referees: Marton, Szabó
Round 5; 3 September 2019; 18:00	Klujber 9	(19–15)	Tóth 7	Elek Gyula Aréna, Budapest; Attendance: 800; Referees: Marton, Szabó
Round 5; 3 September 2019; 18:00	1× (yellow card) 3× (suspension)	Report	1× (yellow card) 2× (suspension)	Elek Gyula Aréna, Budapest; Attendance: 800; Referees: Marton, Szabó

Round 6; 15 October 2019; 18:00	Szent István SE	26–45	FTC-Rail Cargo Hungaria	Municipal Sports Hall, Monor; Attendance: 750; Referees: Marton, Szabó
Round 6; 15 October 2019; 18:00	three players 4	(15–20)	Háfra 7	Municipal Sports Hall, Monor; Attendance: 750; Referees: Marton, Szabó
Round 6; 15 October 2019; 18:00	2× (suspension)	Report	1× (yellow card) 5× (suspension)	Municipal Sports Hall, Monor; Attendance: 750; Referees: Marton, Szabó

Round 7; 25 October 2019; 18:00	FTC-Rail Cargo Hungaria	30–20	Motherson-Mosonmagyaróvár	Elek Gyula Aréna, Budapest; Attendance: 800; Referees: Altmár, Horváth
Round 7; 25 October 2019; 18:00	Lukács 10	(11–10)	Katona 5	Elek Gyula Aréna, Budapest; Attendance: 800; Referees: Altmár, Horváth
Round 7; 25 October 2019; 18:00	1× (yellow card) 6× (suspension)	Report	1× (yellow card) 5× (suspension)	Elek Gyula Aréna, Budapest; Attendance: 800; Referees: Altmár, Horváth

Round 8; 4 January 2020; 17:00	Alba Fehérvár KC	17–25	FTC-Rail Cargo Hungaria	KÖFÉM Sports Hall, Székesfehérvár; Attendance: 850; Referees: Marton, Szabó
Round 8; 4 January 2020; 17:00	Walfisch 4	(9–11)	Lukács 6	KÖFÉM Sports Hall, Székesfehérvár; Attendance: 850; Referees: Marton, Szabó
Round 8; 4 January 2020; 17:00	1× (yellow card) 6× (suspension) 1× (red card)	Report	1× (yellow card) 3× (suspension)	KÖFÉM Sports Hall, Székesfehérvár; Attendance: 850; Referees: Marton, Szabó

Round 9; 10 September 2019; 18:00	FTC-Rail Cargo Hungaria	30–30	DVSC Schaeffler	Elek Gyula Aréna, Budapest; Attendance: 1,000; Referees: Bacs, Bóna
Round 9; 10 September 2019; 18:00	Klujber 11	(15–13)	Bulath 7	Elek Gyula Aréna, Budapest; Attendance: 1,000; Referees: Bacs, Bóna
Round 9; 10 September 2019; 18:00	3× (yellow card) 6× (suspension)	Report	2× (yellow card) 6× (suspension)	Elek Gyula Aréna, Budapest; Attendance: 1,000; Referees: Bacs, Bóna

Round 10; 13 November 2019; 18:00	Váci NKSE	27–30	FTC-Rail Cargo Hungaria	Municipal Sports Hall, Vác; Attendance: 660; Referees: Bócz, Wiedemann
Round 10; 13 November 2019; 18:00	Kácsor 10	(16–13)	Háfra 7	Municipal Sports Hall, Vác; Attendance: 660; Referees: Bócz, Wiedemann
Round 10; 13 November 2019; 18:00	1× (yellow card) 4× (suspension)	Report	1× (yellow card) 4× (suspension)	Municipal Sports Hall, Vác; Attendance: 660; Referees: Bócz, Wiedemann

Round 11; 29 December 2019; 18:00	FTC-Rail Cargo Hungaria	27–28	Győri Audi ETO KC	Elek Gyula Aréna, Budapest; Attendance: 1,200; Referees: Horváth, Marton
Round 11; 29 December 2019; 18:00	Klujber, Kovacsics 6	(13–12)	Oftedal 6	Elek Gyula Aréna, Budapest; Attendance: 1,200; Referees: Horváth, Marton
Round 11; 29 December 2019; 18:00	2× (yellow card) 4× (suspension)	Report	3× (yellow card) 2× (suspension)	Elek Gyula Aréna, Budapest; Attendance: 1,200; Referees: Horváth, Marton

Round 12; 11 January 2020; 18:00	EUbility Group-Békéscsaba	24–39	FTC-Rail Cargo Hungaria	Municipal Sports Hall, Békéscsaba; Attendance: 1,200; Referees: Paska, Vastag
Round 12; 11 January 2020; 18:00	Marincsák, Kopecz 5	(11–18)	Márton, Háfra 6	Municipal Sports Hall, Békéscsaba; Attendance: 1,200; Referees: Paska, Vastag
Round 12; 11 January 2020; 18:00	1× (yellow card) 6× (suspension)	Report	2× (yellow card) 3× (suspension)	Municipal Sports Hall, Békéscsaba; Attendance: 1,200; Referees: Paska, Vastag

Round 13; 18 January 2020; 18:00	FTC-Rail Cargo Hungaria	40–17	Hungast-Szombathelyi KKA	Elek Gyula Aréna, Budapest; Attendance: 800; Referees: Kovács-Sebők, Réti
Round 13; 18 January 2020; 18:00	Klujber 10	(23–9)	Filipović-Bandelier 4	Elek Gyula Aréna, Budapest; Attendance: 800; Referees: Kovács-Sebők, Réti
Round 13; 18 January 2020; 18:00	2× (yellow card) 4× (suspension)	Report	1× (yellow card) 6× (suspension)	Elek Gyula Aréna, Budapest; Attendance: 800; Referees: Kovács-Sebők, Réti

Round 14; 22 January 2020; 19:30	FTC-Rail Cargo Hungaria	33–32	Érd	Elek Gyula Aréna, Budapest; Attendance: 1,100; Referees: Bíró, Kiss
Round 14; 22 January 2020; 19:30	Schatzl 8	(16–15)	Tóth 8	Elek Gyula Aréna, Budapest; Attendance: 1,100; Referees: Bíró, Kiss
Round 14; 22 January 2020; 19:30	2× (yellow card) 2× (suspension)	Report	2× (yellow card) 7× (suspension)	Elek Gyula Aréna, Budapest; Attendance: 1,100; Referees: Bíró, Kiss

Round 15; 15 January 2020; 18:00	Kisvárda Master Good SE	21–32	FTC-Rail Cargo Hungaria	Municipal Sports Hall, Kisvárda; Attendance: 980; Referees: Őri, Pozdena
Round 15; 15 January 2020; 18:00	Habánková, Szabó 5	(13–18)	three players 6	Municipal Sports Hall, Kisvárda; Attendance: 980; Referees: Őri, Pozdena
Round 15; 15 January 2020; 18:00	2× (yellow card) 4× (suspension)	Report	1× (yellow card) 5× (suspension)	Municipal Sports Hall, Kisvárda; Attendance: 980; Referees: Őri, Pozdena

Round 16; 14 February 2020; 18:30	Dunaújvárosi Kohász KA	24–30	FTC-Rail Cargo Hungaria	Municipal Sports Hall, Szekszárd; Attendance: 800; Referees: Medve, Südi
Round 16; 14 February 2020; 18:30	Szekerczés 8	(14–15)	Schatzl 6	Municipal Sports Hall, Szekszárd; Attendance: 800; Referees: Medve, Südi
Round 16; 14 February 2020; 18:30	3× (yellow card) 6× (suspension)	Report	2× (yellow card) 7× (suspension)	Municipal Sports Hall, Szekszárd; Attendance: 800; Referees: Medve, Südi

Round 17; 18 February 2019; 18:00	FTC-Rail Cargo Hungaria	24–26	Siófok KC	Elek Gyula Aréna, Budapest; Attendance: 1,200; Referees: Horváth, Marton
Round 17; 18 February 2019; 18:00	Háfra 7	(14–16)	Kobetić 8	Elek Gyula Aréna, Budapest; Attendance: 1,200; Referees: Horváth, Marton
Round 17; 18 February 2019; 18:00	2× (yellow card) 2× (suspension)	Report	2× (yellow card) 4× (suspension) 1× (red card)	Elek Gyula Aréna, Budapest; Attendance: 1,200; Referees: Horváth, Marton

Round 18; 7 January 2020; 19:00	MTK Budapest	36–36	FTC-Rail Cargo Hungaria	Elektromos hall, Budapest; Attendance: 400; Referees: Hantos, Rózsahegyi
Round 18; 7 January 2020; 19:00	Fekete 8	(20–21)	Lukács 8	Elektromos hall, Budapest; Attendance: 400; Referees: Hantos, Rózsahegyi
Round 18; 7 January 2020; 19:00	1× (yellow card) 3× (suspension)	Report	1× (yellow card) 3× (suspension)	Elektromos hall, Budapest; Attendance: 400; Referees: Hantos, Rózsahegyi

==== Results overview ====
Opposition	Home score	Away score	Double
Alba Fehérvár KC	15 Apr	17–25	-
EUbility Group-Békéscsaba	20 May	24–39	-
DVSC Schaeffler	30–30	18 Apr	-
Dunaújvárosi Kohász KA	31–23	24–30	61–47
Érd	33–32	28–31	64–60
Győri Audi ETO KC	27–28	2 May	-
Kisvárda Master Good SE	30–22	21–31	61–43
MTK Budapest	36–22	36–36	72–58
Motherson-Mosonmagyaróvár	30–20	3 Apr	-
Siófok KC	24–26	31–31	55–57
Szent István SE	11 Mar	26–45	-
Hungast-Szombathelyi KKA	40–17	23 May	-
Váci NKSE	25 Apr	27–30	-

=== EHF Champions League ===
==== Group stage ====
Pos	Team	Pld	W	D	L	GF	GA	GD	Pts	Qualification	MET	VIP	FER	POD
1	(France) Metz Handball	6	4	2	0	194	158	+36	10	Main round	—	26–17	24–24	40–26
2	(Norway) Vipers Kristiansand	6	3	1	2	178	168	+10	7	Main round	38–38	—	31–22	34–28
3	(Hungary) FTC-Rail Cargo Hungaria	6	2	1	3	167	180	−13	5	Main round	28–34	29–34	—	37–31
4	(Croatia) Podravka Vegeta	6	1	0	5	161	194	−33	2	EHF Cup	25–32	25–24	26–27	—

Source: EHF
Rules for classification: Tiebreakers

===== Matches =====
5 October 2019; 19:15	Vipers Kristiansand (Norway)	31–22	FTC-Rail Cargo Hungaria	Aquarama Kristiansand, Kristiansand; Attendance: 1,640; Referees: Leandersson, Lindroos (FIN)
5 October 2019; 19:15	Løke 8	(16–11)	Háfra 10	Aquarama Kristiansand, Kristiansand; Attendance: 1,640; Referees: Leandersson, Lindroos (FIN)
5 October 2019; 19:15	2× (yellow card) 3× (suspension)	Report	2× (yellow card) 5× (suspension)	Aquarama Kristiansand, Kristiansand; Attendance: 1,640; Referees: Leandersson, Lindroos (FIN)

13 October 2019; 13:00	FTC-Rail Cargo Hungaria	28–34	(France) Metz Handball	Érd Aréna, Érd (Note: FTC-Rail Cargo Hungaria played their home Champions League matches at Érd Aréna, Érd, instead of their regular hall Elek Gyula Aréna, Budapest.); Attendance: 2,050; Referees: Opava, Válek (CZE)
13 October 2019; 13:00	Klujber 12	(16–20)	Zaadi 6	Érd Aréna, Érd; Attendance: 2,050; Referees: Opava, Válek (CZE)
13 October 2019; 13:00	2× (yellow card) 6× (suspension)	Report	3× (yellow card) 4× (suspension) 1× (red card)	Érd Aréna, Érd; Attendance: 2,050; Referees: Opava, Válek (CZE)

19 October 2019; 15:00	FTC-Rail Cargo Hungaria	37–31	(Croatia) Podravka Vegeta	Érd Aréna, Érd; Attendance: 1,800; Referees: Florescu, Stoia (ROU)
19 October 2019; 15:00	Klujber 11	(17–17)	Milosavljević 8	Érd Aréna, Érd; Attendance: 1,800; Referees: Florescu, Stoia (ROU)
19 October 2019; 15:00	2× (yellow card) 4× (suspension)	Report	3× (yellow card) 6× (suspension) 1× (red card)	Érd Aréna, Érd; Attendance: 1,800; Referees: Florescu, Stoia (ROU)

2 November 2019; 20:00	Podravka Vegeta (Croatia)	26–27	FTC-Rail Cargo Hungaria	Gimnazija "Fran Galović", Koprivnica; Attendance: 2,500; Referees: Mitrović, Kažanegra (MNE)
2 November 2019; 20:00	Milosavljević 9	(15–14)	three players 5	Gimnazija "Fran Galović", Koprivnica; Attendance: 2,500; Referees: Mitrović, Kažanegra (MNE)
2 November 2019; 20:00	3× (yellow card) 3× (suspension)	Report	1× (yellow card) 6× (suspension)	Gimnazija "Fran Galović", Koprivnica; Attendance: 2,500; Referees: Mitrović, Kažanegra (MNE)

9 November 2019; 19:30	FTC-Rail Cargo Hungaria	29–34	(Norway) Vipers Kristiansand	Érd Aréna, Érd; Attendance: 2,200; Referees: Merz, Kuttler (GER)
9 November 2019; 19:30	Klujber 6	(15–19)	Arntzen 11	Érd Aréna, Érd; Attendance: 2,200; Referees: Merz, Kuttler (GER)
9 November 2019; 19:30	2× (yellow card) 6× (suspension)	Report	2× (yellow card) 6× (suspension)	Érd Aréna, Érd; Attendance: 2,200; Referees: Merz, Kuttler (GER)

16 November 2019; 19:30	Metz Handball (France)	24–24	FTC-Rail Cargo Hungaria	Palais omnisport Les Arènes, Metz; Attendance: 4,200; Referees: Ilieva, Karbeska (MKD)
16 November 2019; 19:30	Zaadi 6	(10–14)	Schatzl 7	Palais omnisport Les Arènes, Metz; Attendance: 4,200; Referees: Ilieva, Karbeska (MKD)
16 November 2019; 19:30	3× (yellow card) 2× (suspension)	Report	4× (yellow card) 4× (suspension)	Palais omnisport Les Arènes, Metz; Attendance: 4,200; Referees: Ilieva, Karbeska (MKD)

===== Results overview =====
Opposition	Home score	Away score	Double
(France) Metz Handball	28–34	24–24	52–58
(Norway) Vipers Kristiansand	29–34	31–22	51–65
(Croatia) Podravka Vegeta	37–31	26–27	64–57

==== Main round ====
Pos	Team	Pld	W	D	L	GF	GA	GD	Pts	Qualification	MET	ESB	ROS	BUC	VIP	FER
1	(France) Metz Handball	10	5	3	2	289	270	+19	13 (Note: Metz Handball 5 Pts, +7 GD; Team Esbjerg 5 Pts, −2 GD; Rostov-Don 2 Pts, −5 GD)	Quarterfinals	—	31–31	23–20	28–26	26–17	24–24
2	(Denmark) Team Esbjerg	10	6	1	3	289	279	+10	13	Quarterfinals	30–29	—	31–26	22–24	33–30	29–27
3	(Russia) Rostov-Don	10	6	1	3	279	266	+13	13	Quarterfinals	24–29	34–26	—	23–22	33–26	29–26
4	(Romania) CSM București	10	5	1	4	251	250	+1	11	Quarterfinals	32–27	21–25	23–23	—	28–22	27–24
5	(Norway) Vipers Kristiansand	10	2	1	7	281	303	−22	5 (Note: Vipers Kristiansand 65–51 FTC-Rail Cargo Hungaria)		38–38	31–35	29–32	23–25	—	31–22
6	(Hungary) FTC-Rail Cargo Hungaria	10	2	1	7	270	291	−21	5		28–34	26–25	31–35	33–23	29–34	—

Source: EHF
Rules for classification: Tiebreakers

===== Matches =====
25 January 2020; 16:00	FTC-Rail Cargo Hungaria	33–23	(Romania) CSM București	Érd Aréna, Érd; Attendance: 2,200; Referees: Mata, López (ESP)
25 January 2020; 16:00	Schatzl 8	(19–10)	Neagu 7	Érd Aréna, Érd; Attendance: 2,200; Referees: Mata, López (ESP)
25 January 2020; 16:00	1× (yellow card) 3× (suspension)	Report	1× (yellow card) 4× (suspension)	Érd Aréna, Érd; Attendance: 2,200; Referees: Mata, López (ESP)

2 February 2020; 16:50	Team Esbjerg (Denmark)	29–27	FTC-Rail Cargo Hungaria	Blue Water Dokken, Esbjerg; Attendance: 2,102; Referees: Antić, Jakovljević (SRB)
2 February 2020; 16:50	Polman 8	(13–13)	Lukács 6	Blue Water Dokken, Esbjerg; Attendance: 2,102; Referees: Antić, Jakovljević (SRB)
2 February 2020; 16:50	1× (yellow card) 2× (suspension)	Report	1× (yellow card) 3× (suspension)	Blue Water Dokken, Esbjerg; Attendance: 2,102; Referees: Antić, Jakovljević (SRB)

8 February 2020; 20:00	FTC-Rail Cargo Hungaria	31–35	(Russia) Rostov-Don	Érd Aréna, Érd; Attendance: 2,200; Referees: Freitas, Carvalho (POR)
8 February 2020; 20:00	Klujber 9	(14–19)	Managarova, Vyakhireva 9	Érd Aréna, Érd; Attendance: 2,200; Referees: Freitas, Carvalho (POR)
8 February 2020; 20:00	2× (yellow card) 4× (suspension)	Report	1× (yellow card) 3× (suspension)	Érd Aréna, Érd; Attendance: 2,200; Referees: Freitas, Carvalho (POR)

21 February 2020; 17:30 (18:30 EET)	CSM București (Romania)	27–24	FTC-Rail Cargo Hungaria	Sala Polivalentă, Bucharest; Attendance: 4,500; Referees: Novikov, Rozhkov (UKR)
21 February 2020; 17:30 (18:30 EET)	Neagu 8	(23–20)	Lukács 7	Sala Polivalentă, Bucharest; Attendance: 4,500; Referees: Novikov, Rozhkov (UKR)
21 February 2020; 17:30 (18:30 EET)	1× (yellow card) 4× (suspension)	Report	3× (yellow card) 3× (suspension)	Sala Polivalentă, Bucharest; Attendance: 4,500; Referees: Novikov, Rozhkov (UKR)

1 March 2020; 15:00	FTC-Rail Cargo Hungaria	26–25	(Denmark) Team Esbjerg	Érd Aréna, Érd; Attendance: 2,000; Referees: Hatipoğlu, Şimşek (TUR)
1 March 2020; 15:00	Klujber 12	(13–15)	Polman 10	Érd Aréna, Érd; Attendance: 2,000; Referees: Hatipoğlu, Şimşek (TUR)
1 March 2020; 15:00	1× (yellow card) 4× (suspension)	Report	3× (yellow card) 2× (suspension)	Érd Aréna, Érd; Attendance: 2,000; Referees: Hatipoğlu, Şimşek (TUR)

7 March 2020; 14:00 (16:00 MSK)	Rostov-Don (Russia)	29–26	FTC-Rail Cargo Hungaria	Rostov-on-Don Palace of Sports, Rostov-on-Don; Attendance: 2,971; Referees: Jerlecki, Labun (POL)
7 March 2020; 14:00 (16:00 MSK)	Aen, Vyakhireva 6	(17–9)	Klujber 9	Rostov-on-Don Palace of Sports, Rostov-on-Don; Attendance: 2,971; Referees: Jerlecki, Labun (POL)
7 March 2020; 14:00 (16:00 MSK)	2× (yellow card) 5× (suspension)	Report	1× (yellow card) 4× (suspension)	Rostov-on-Don Palace of Sports, Rostov-on-Don; Attendance: 2,971; Referees: Jerlecki, Labun (POL)

===== Results overview =====
Opposition	Home score	Away score	Double
(Russia) Rostov-Don	31–35	29–26	57–64
(Denmark) Team Esbjerg	26–25	29–27	53–54
(Romania) CSM București	33–23	27–24	57–50

== Statistics ==
=== Top scorers ===
Includes all competitive matches. The list is sorted by shirt number when total goals are equal.

Last updated on 29 February 2020

Position	Nation	No.	Name	Hungarian League	Hungarian Cup	Champions League	Total
1	(Hungary)	42	Katrin Klujber	101	0	63	164
2	(Hungary)	45	Noémi Háfra	95	0	43	138
3	(Hungary)	22	Viktória Lukács	84	0	44	128
4	(Hungary)	91	Anikó Kovacsics	68	0	36	104
5	(Hungary)	6	Nadine Schatzl	57	0	29	86
6	(Netherlands)	24	Danick Snelder	38	0	15	53
7	(Hungary)	21	Gréta Márton	37	0	13	50
8	(Hungary)	15	Kinga Debreczeni-Klivinyi	23	0	17	40
9	(Hungary)	2	Noémi Pásztor	23	0	9	32
10	(Hungary)	8	Zita Szucsánszki	13	0	6	19
11	(Norway)	17	Emilie Christensen	11	0	3	14
12	(Hungary)	28	Kíra Bánfai	13	0	1	14
13	(Hungary)	33	Nikolett Tóth	12	0	2	14
14	(Hungary)	92	Dóra Hornyák	3	0	0	3
15	(Hungary)	14	Rea Mészáros	1	0	1	2
			TOTALS	579	0	257	836

=== Attendances ===
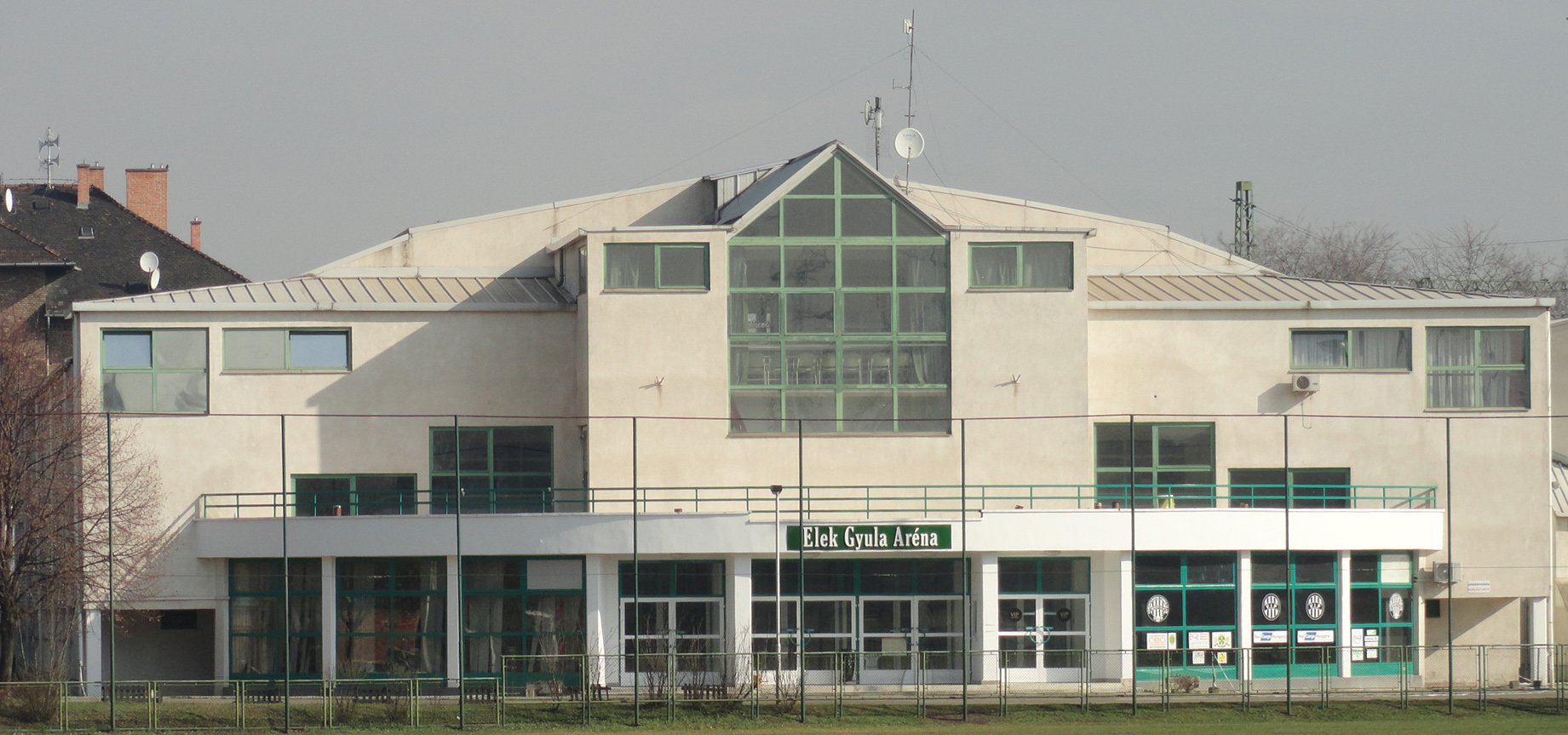
Home hall: Elek Gyula Aréna

List of the home matches:

Round	Against	Attadance	Capatility	Date
NB I- 5.	MTK Budapest	800	61,5%	September 3, 2019
NB I- 2.	Kisvárda Master Good SE	800	61,5%	September 6, 2019
NB I- 9.	DVSC Schaeffler	1,000	76,9%	September 10, 2019
NB I- 3.	Dunaújvárosi Kohász KA	1,000	76,9%	September 13, 2019
CL-(GS) 2.	Metz Handball (France)	2,050	93,2%	October 13, 2019
CL-(GS) 3.	Podravka Vegeta (Croatia)	1,800	81,8%	October 19, 2019
NB I- 7.	Motherson-Mosonmagyaróvár	800	61,5%	October 25, 2019
CL-(GS) 5.	Vipers Kristiansand (Norway)	2,200	100,0%	November 9, 2019
NB I- 11.	Győri Audi ETO KC	1,200	92,3%	December 29, 2019
NB I- 13.	Szombathelyi KKA	800	61,5%	January 18, 2020
NB I- 14.	Érd	1,100	85,6%	January 22, 2020
CL-(MR) 1.	CSM București (Romania)	2,200	100,0%	January 25, 2020
CL-(MR) 3.	Rostov-Don (Russia)	2,200	100,0%	February 8, 2020
NB I- 17.	Siófok KC	1,200	92,3%	February 18, 2020
CL-(MR) 5.	Team Esbjerg (Denmark)	2,000	90,9%	March 1, 2020
NB I- 21.	Alba Fehévár KC		%	April 11, 2020
NB I- 19.	Szent István SE		%	May 7, 2020
