= 2019–20 Women's EHF Cup group stage =

This article describes the group stage of the 2019–20 Women's EHF Cup, a women's handball competition.

== Draw ==
The draw of the Women's EHF Cup group stage will take place on Thursday, 22 November 2019. The 16 teams allocated into four pots will be drawn into four groups of four teams.

=== Seedings ===
The seedings were announced on 18 November 2019:

Pot 1	Pot 2	Pot 3	Pot 4
(Croatia) Podravka Vegeta (Czech Republic) DHK Baník Most (Germany) SG BBM Bietigheim (Poland) MKS Perla Lublin	(Denmark) Herning-Ikast Håndbold (Hungary) Érd HC (Hungary) Siófok KC (Turkey) Kastamonu Bld. GSK	(Germany) Thüringer HC; ~~(Romania) CSM Corona Brașov~~ (Romania) CS Gloria 2018 Bistrița-Năsăud (Romania) CS Măgura Cisnădie (Russia) HC Lada	(Denmark) København Håndbold (Denmark) Odense Håndbold (Hungary) DVSC Schaeffler (Norway) Storhamar HE

== Format ==
In each group, teams played against each other in a double round-robin format, with home and away matches. After completion of the group stage matches, the top two teams advanced to the Quarter-finals. Teams are not able to face opponents from the same country in the group.

== Tiebreakers ==
In the group stage, teams were ranked according to points (2 points for a win, 1 point for a draw, 0 points for a loss). After completion of the group stage, if two or more teams had scored the same number of points, the ranking will be determined as follows:

1. Highest number of points in matches between the teams directly involved;
2. Superior goal difference in matches between the teams directly involved;
3. Highest number of goals scored in matches between the teams directly involved (or in the away match in case of a two-team tie);
4. Superior goal difference in all matches of the group;
5. Highest number of plus goals in all matches of the group;

If the ranking of one of these teams is determined, the above criteria are consecutively followed until the ranking of all teams is determined. If no ranking can be determined, a decision shall be obtained by EHF through drawing of lots.

== Groups ==
The matchdays were 4–5 January, 11–12 January, 18–19 January, 25–26 January, 1–2 February and 8–9 February 2020.

=== Group A ===
Pos	Team	Pld	W	D	L	GF	GA	GD	Pts	Qualification
1	(Germany) Thüringer HC	6	6	0	0	184	141	+43	12	Knockout stage
2	(Turkey) Kastamonu Bld. GSK	6	3	0	3	176	175	+1	6 (Note: Kastamonu Bld. GSK 64–63 DVSC Schaeffler)	Knockout stage
3	(Hungary) DVSC Schaeffler	6	3	0	3	170	173	−3	6	
4	(Czech Republic) DHK Baník Most	6	0	0	6	163	204	−41	0	

Source: EHF
Notes:

4 January 2020; 13:00	Kastamonu Bld. GSK (Turkey)	30–31	(Hungary) DVSC Schaeffler	Atatürk Sports Hall, Kastamonu; Attendance: 1,500; Referees: Manea, Iliescu (ROU)
4 January 2020; 13:00	İskit, Özel 8	(17–15)	Arany 9	Atatürk Sports Hall, Kastamonu; Attendance: 1,500; Referees: Manea, Iliescu (ROU)
4 January 2020; 13:00	1× (yellow card) 3× (suspension)	Report	3× (yellow card) 3× (suspension)	Atatürk Sports Hall, Kastamonu; Attendance: 1,500; Referees: Manea, Iliescu (ROU)

5 January 2020; 19:00	DHK Baník Most (Czech Republic)	27–35	(Germany) Thüringer HC	Sportovní hala Banik Most, Most; Attendance: 1,002; Referees: Tzaferopoulos, Bethmann (GRE)
5 January 2020; 19:00	Šustková 6	(13–18)	Korešová 9	Sportovní hala Banik Most, Most; Attendance: 1,002; Referees: Tzaferopoulos, Bethmann (GRE)
5 January 2020; 19:00	2× (yellow card) 4× (suspension)	Report	3× (yellow card) 3× (suspension)	Sportovní hala Banik Most, Most; Attendance: 1,002; Referees: Tzaferopoulos, Bethmann (GRE)

11 January 2020; 14:00	DVSC Schaeffler (Hungary)	36–29	(Czech Republic) DHK Baník Most	Hódos Imre Sportcsarnok, Debrecen; Attendance: 1,800; Referees: Carmaux, Mursch (FRA)
11 January 2020; 14:00	Bulath, Karnik 5	(14–14)	Šustková 6	Hódos Imre Sportcsarnok, Debrecen; Attendance: 1,800; Referees: Carmaux, Mursch (FRA)
11 January 2020; 14:00	2× (yellow card) 4× (suspension)	Report	6× (suspension)	Hódos Imre Sportcsarnok, Debrecen; Attendance: 1,800; Referees: Carmaux, Mursch (FRA)

12 January 2020; 15:00	Thüringer HC (Germany)	27–24	(Turkey) Kastamonu Bld. GSK	Wiedigsburghalle, Nordhausen; Attendance: 1,500; Referees: Bennani, Bennani (SWE)
12 January 2020; 15:00	three players 5	(16–12)	İskit 8	Wiedigsburghalle, Nordhausen; Attendance: 1,500; Referees: Bennani, Bennani (SWE)
12 January 2020; 15:00	2× (yellow card)	Report	3× (yellow card) 4× (suspension)	Wiedigsburghalle, Nordhausen; Attendance: 1,500; Referees: Bennani, Bennani (SWE)

18 January 2020; 13:00	Kastamonu Bld. GSK (Turkey)	33–27	(Czech Republic) DHK Baník Most	Atatürk Sports Hall, Kastamonu; Attendance: 1,200; Referees: Jović, Arnautović (BIH)
18 January 2020; 13:00	three players 5	(15–13)	Stříšková 9	Atatürk Sports Hall, Kastamonu; Attendance: 1,200; Referees: Jović, Arnautović (BIH)
18 January 2020; 13:00	1× (yellow card) 5× (suspension)	Report	3× (yellow card) 4× (suspension) 1× (red card)	Atatürk Sports Hall, Kastamonu; Attendance: 1,200; Referees: Jović, Arnautović (BIH)

18 January 2020; 15:00	DVSC Schaeffler (Hungary)	19–26	(Germany) Thüringer HC	Hódos Imre Sportcsarnok, Debrecen; Attendance: 1,800; Referees: Braseth, Sundet (NOR)
18 January 2020; 15:00	Bulath 4	(7–12)	Scheffknecht 8	Hódos Imre Sportcsarnok, Debrecen; Attendance: 1,800; Referees: Braseth, Sundet (NOR)
18 January 2020; 15:00	2× (yellow card) 2× (suspension)	Report	1× (yellow card) 3× (suspension)	Hódos Imre Sportcsarnok, Debrecen; Attendance: 1,800; Referees: Braseth, Sundet (NOR)

26 January 2020; 14:00	Thüringer HC (Germany)	26–23	(Hungary) DVSC Schaeffler	Wiedigsburghalle, Nordhausen; Attendance: 1,500; Referees: Barysas, Petrušis (LTU)
26 January 2020; 14:00	Scheffknecht 9	(15–13)	Bulath 7	Wiedigsburghalle, Nordhausen; Attendance: 1,500; Referees: Barysas, Petrušis (LTU)
26 January 2020; 14:00	1× (yellow card) 3× (suspension)	Report	3× (yellow card) 2× (suspension)	Wiedigsburghalle, Nordhausen; Attendance: 1,500; Referees: Barysas, Petrušis (LTU)

26 January 2020; 18:00	DHK Baník Most (Czech Republic)	28–31	(Turkey) Kastamonu Bld. GSK	Sportovní hala Banik Most, Most; Attendance: 790; Referees: Jerlecki, Labun (POL)
26 January 2020; 18:00	Zachová 7	(14–13)	İskit 12	Sportovní hala Banik Most, Most; Attendance: 790; Referees: Jerlecki, Labun (POL)
26 January 2020; 18:00	1× (yellow card) 3× (suspension)	Report	3× (yellow card) 6× (suspension)	Sportovní hala Banik Most, Most; Attendance: 790; Referees: Jerlecki, Labun (POL)

1 February 2020; 15:00	DVSC Schaeffler (Hungary)	32–34	(Turkey) Kastamonu Bld. GSK	Hódos Imre Sportcsarnok, Debrecen; Attendance: 1,800; Referees: Ershov, Pavliukov (RUS)
1 February 2020; 15:00	Despotović 8	(20–20)	Coşkun, İskenderoğlu 7	Hódos Imre Sportcsarnok, Debrecen; Attendance: 1,800; Referees: Ershov, Pavliukov (RUS)
1 February 2020; 15:00	3× (yellow card) 3× (suspension)	Report	3× (yellow card) 6× (suspension)	Hódos Imre Sportcsarnok, Debrecen; Attendance: 1,800; Referees: Ershov, Pavliukov (RUS)

2 February 2020; 15:00	Thüringer HC (Germany)	40–24	(Czech Republic) DHK Baník Most	Wiedigsburghalle, Nordhausen; Attendance: 1,300; Referees: Backović, Palačković (SLO)
2 February 2020; 15:00	Bölk 7	(18–8)	Stříšková 5	Wiedigsburghalle, Nordhausen; Attendance: 1,300; Referees: Backović, Palačković (SLO)
2 February 2020; 15:00	2× (yellow card) 4× (suspension)	Report	2× (yellow card) 4× (suspension)	Wiedigsburghalle, Nordhausen; Attendance: 1,300; Referees: Backović, Palačković (SLO)

8 February 2020; 13:00	Kastamonu Bld. GSK (Turkey)	24–30	(Germany) Thüringer HC	Atatürk Sports Hall, Kastamonu; Attendance: 1,126; Referees: Geraets, Geraets (NED)
8 February 2020; 13:00	İskenderoğlu 7	(11–14)	Mässing 7	Atatürk Sports Hall, Kastamonu; Attendance: 1,126; Referees: Geraets, Geraets (NED)
8 February 2020; 13:00	1× (yellow card) 2× (suspension)	Report	2× (yellow card) 3× (suspension) 1× (red card)	Atatürk Sports Hall, Kastamonu; Attendance: 1,126; Referees: Geraets, Geraets (NED)

9 February 2020; 19:00	DHK Baník Most (Czech Republic)	28–29	(Hungary) DVSC Schaeffler	Sportovní hala Banik Most, Most; Attendance: 800; Referees: Ivanović, Vujišić (MNE)
9 February 2020; 19:00	Šustková 8	(12–14)	Despotović 7	Sportovní hala Banik Most, Most; Attendance: 800; Referees: Ivanović, Vujišić (MNE)
9 February 2020; 19:00	1× (yellow card) 8× (suspension)	Report	2× (yellow card) 9× (suspension) 2× (red card)	Sportovní hala Banik Most, Most; Attendance: 800; Referees: Ivanović, Vujišić (MNE)

=== Group B ===
Pos	Team	Pld	W	D	L	GF	GA	GD	Pts	Qualification
1	(Hungary) Siófok KC	6	4	2	0	192	158	+34	10	Knockout stage
2	(Croatia) Podravka Vegeta	6	3	2	1	189	176	+13	8	Knockout stage
3	(Denmark) København Håndbold	6	3	0	3	174	171	+3	6	
4	(Romania) CS Măgura Cisnădie	6	0	0	6	150	200	−50	0	

Source: EHF

5 January 2020; 15:30	HC Podravka Vegeta (Croatia)	38–26	(Romania) CS Măgura Cisnădie	Gimnazija "Fran Galović", Koprivnica; Attendance: 2,000; Referees: Xhema, Jahja (KOS)
5 January 2020; 15:30	Milosavljević 10	(18–12)	Moldovan 8	Gimnazija "Fran Galović", Koprivnica; Attendance: 2,000; Referees: Xhema, Jahja (KOS)
5 January 2020; 15:30	3× (yellow card) 6× (suspension)	Report	1× (yellow card) 2× (suspension)	Gimnazija "Fran Galović", Koprivnica; Attendance: 2,000; Referees: Xhema, Jahja (KOS)

5 January 2020; 17:00	Siófok KC (Hungary)	36–23	(Denmark) København Håndbold	Kiss Szilárd Sportcsarnok, Siófok; Attendance: 1,200; Referees: Ivanović, Vujisić (MNE)
5 January 2020; 17:00	Pena 11	(17–13)	Rej 7	Kiss Szilárd Sportcsarnok, Siófok; Attendance: 1,200; Referees: Ivanović, Vujisić (MNE)
5 January 2020; 17:00	1× (yellow card) 4× (suspension)	Report	1× (yellow card) 4× (suspension)	Kiss Szilárd Sportcsarnok, Siófok; Attendance: 1,200; Referees: Ivanović, Vujisić (MNE)

11 January 2020; 14:00	København Håndbold (Denmark)	26–28	(Croatia) HC Podravka Vegeta	Frederiksberghallen, Frederiksberg; Attendance: 446; Referees: Doychinov, Goretsov (BUL)
11 January 2020; 14:00	Blohm 7	(15–13)	Stanko 7	Frederiksberghallen, Frederiksberg; Attendance: 446; Referees: Doychinov, Goretsov (BUL)
11 January 2020; 14:00	1× (yellow card) 2× (suspension)	Report	1× (yellow card) 3× (suspension)	Frederiksberghallen, Frederiksberg; Attendance: 446; Referees: Doychinov, Goretsov (BUL)

12 January 2020; 14:00	CS Măgura Cisnădie (Romania)	23–31	(Hungary) Siófok KC	Polyvalent Hall Magura Cisnadie, Cisnădie; Attendance: 1,200; Referees: Sekulić, Jovandić (SRB)
12 January 2020; 14:00	Moldovan 6	(9–17)	Böhme, Tomori 6	Polyvalent Hall Magura Cisnadie, Cisnădie; Attendance: 1,200; Referees: Sekulić, Jovandić (SRB)
12 January 2020; 14:00	2× (yellow card) 3× (suspension)	Report	2× (yellow card) 4× (suspension)	Polyvalent Hall Magura Cisnadie, Cisnădie; Attendance: 1,200; Referees: Sekulić, Jovandić (SRB)

18 January 2020; 17:00	Siófok KC (Hungary)	30–30	(Croatia) HC Podravka Vegeta	Kiss Szilárd Sportcsarnok, Siófok; Attendance: 1,185; Referees: Novikov, Rozhkov (UKR)
18 January 2020; 17:00	Kobetić 6	(18–14)	four players 5	Kiss Szilárd Sportcsarnok, Siófok; Attendance: 1,185; Referees: Novikov, Rozhkov (UKR)
18 January 2020; 17:00	2× (yellow card) 2× (suspension)	Report	1× (yellow card) 3× (suspension)	Kiss Szilárd Sportcsarnok, Siófok; Attendance: 1,185; Referees: Novikov, Rozhkov (UKR)

19 January 2020; 13:00	København Håndbold (Denmark)	33–22	(Romania) CS Măgura Cisnădie	Frederiksberghallen, Frederiksberg; Attendance: 447; Referees: Hannes, Hannes (GER)
19 January 2020; 13:00	Bont 9	(14–8)	Moldovan 8	Frederiksberghallen, Frederiksberg; Attendance: 447; Referees: Hannes, Hannes (GER)
19 January 2020; 13:00	2× (yellow card) 1× (suspension)	Report	2× (yellow card) 6× (suspension) 2× (red card)	Frederiksberghallen, Frederiksberg; Attendance: 447; Referees: Hannes, Hannes (GER)

26 January 2020; 13:00	CS Măgura Cisnădie (Romania)	28–33	(Denmark) København Håndbold	Polyvalent Hall Magura Cisnadie, Cisnădie; Attendance: 800; Referees: Korja, Metsämäki (FIN)
26 January 2020; 13:00	Tănasie 7	(20–17)	Rej 10	Polyvalent Hall Magura Cisnadie, Cisnădie; Attendance: 800; Referees: Korja, Metsämäki (FIN)
26 January 2020; 13:00	2× (yellow card) 3× (suspension)	Report	1× (yellow card)	Polyvalent Hall Magura Cisnadie, Cisnădie; Attendance: 800; Referees: Korja, Metsämäki (FIN)

26 January 2020; 15:30	HC Podravka Vegeta (Croatia)	33–33	(Hungary) Siófok KC	Gimnazija "Fran Galović", Koprivnica; Attendance: 2,000; Referees: Christidi, Papamattheou (GRE)
26 January 2020; 15:30	Stanko 7	(16–15)	Kobetić 12	Gimnazija "Fran Galović", Koprivnica; Attendance: 2,000; Referees: Christidi, Papamattheou (GRE)
26 January 2020; 15:30	4× (yellow card) 4× (suspension)	Report	3× (yellow card) 4× (suspension)	Gimnazija "Fran Galović", Koprivnica; Attendance: 2,000; Referees: Christidi, Papamattheou (GRE)

2 February 2020; 10:30	CS Măgura Cisnădie (Romania)	29–31	(Croatia) HC Podravka Vegeta	Polyvalent Hall Magura Cisnadie, Cisnădie; Attendance: 800; Referees: Fremstad, Pedersen (NOR)
2 February 2020; 10:30	Crăciun 8	(15–17)	Stanko 10	Polyvalent Hall Magura Cisnadie, Cisnădie; Attendance: 800; Referees: Fremstad, Pedersen (NOR)
2 February 2020; 10:30	1× (yellow card) 5× (suspension) 1× (red card)	Report	5× (suspension) 1× (red card)	Polyvalent Hall Magura Cisnadie, Cisnădie; Attendance: 800; Referees: Fremstad, Pedersen (NOR)

2 February 2020; 14:00	København Håndbold (Denmark)	27–28	(Hungary) Siófok KC	Frederiksberghallen, Frederiksberg; Attendance: 773; Referees: Rosendo, Estévez (ESP)
2 February 2020; 14:00	Bont 7	(15–15)	Kobetić 9	Frederiksberghallen, Frederiksberg; Attendance: 773; Referees: Rosendo, Estévez (ESP)
2 February 2020; 14:00	2× (yellow card) 4× (suspension)	Report	4× (yellow card) 1× (suspension)	Frederiksberghallen, Frederiksberg; Attendance: 773; Referees: Rosendo, Estévez (ESP)

9 February 2020; 15:00	Siófok KC (Hungary)	34–22	(Romania) CS Măgura Cisnădie	Kiss Szilárd Sportcsarnok, Siófok; Attendance: 1,200; Referees: Mertinian, Syrepisios (GRE)
9 February 2020; 15:00	three players 6	(12–15)	three players 4	Kiss Szilárd Sportcsarnok, Siófok; Attendance: 1,200; Referees: Mertinian, Syrepisios (GRE)
9 February 2020; 15:00	2× (yellow card) 1× (suspension)	Report	1× (yellow card) 4× (suspension)	Kiss Szilárd Sportcsarnok, Siófok; Attendance: 1,200; Referees: Mertinian, Syrepisios (GRE)

9 February 2020; 17:00	HC Podravka Vegeta (Croatia)	29–32	(Denmark) København Håndbold	Gimnazija "Fran Galović", Koprivnica; Attendance: 2,080; Referees: Jerlecki, Labun (POL)
9 February 2020; 17:00	Karlovčan 5	(13–18)	Rej 7	Gimnazija "Fran Galović", Koprivnica; Attendance: 2,080; Referees: Jerlecki, Labun (POL)
9 February 2020; 17:00	3× (yellow card) 2× (suspension)	Report	2× (yellow card) 3× (suspension)	Gimnazija "Fran Galović", Koprivnica; Attendance: 2,080; Referees: Jerlecki, Labun (POL)

=== Group C ===
Pos	Team	Pld	W	D	L	GF	GA	GD	Pts	Qualification
1	(Denmark) Odense Håndbold	6	5	0	1	175	133	+42	10	Knockout stage
2	(Romania) CS Gloria 2018 Bistrița-Năsăud	6	2	3	1	141	139	+2	7	Knockout stage
3	(Hungary) Érd HC	6	2	2	2	158	155	+3	6	
4	(Poland) MKS Perła Lublin	6	0	1	5	127	174	−47	1	

Source: EHF

4 January 2020; 18:00	Érd HC (Hungary)	27–28	(Denmark) Odense Håndbold	Érd Aréna, Érd; Attendance: 2,400; Referees: Lindenbaum, Laron (ISR)
4 January 2020; 18:00	Kovačević 7	(12–12)	Groot 6	Érd Aréna, Érd; Attendance: 2,400; Referees: Lindenbaum, Laron (ISR)
4 January 2020; 18:00	1× (yellow card) 1× (suspension)	Report	1× (yellow card) 4× (suspension)	Érd Aréna, Érd; Attendance: 2,400; Referees: Lindenbaum, Laron (ISR)

5 January 2020; 17:00	MKS Perła Lublin (Poland)	22–22	(Romania) CS Gloria 2018 Bistrița-Năsăud	Globus Hall, Lublin; Attendance: 1,500; Referees: Loshak, Shajbakov (UKR)
5 January 2020; 17:00	Nosek 7	(10–12)	Ilyina 6	Globus Hall, Lublin; Attendance: 1,500; Referees: Loshak, Shajbakov (UKR)
5 January 2020; 17:00	2× (yellow card) 4× (suspension)	Report	3× (yellow card) 3× (suspension)	Globus Hall, Lublin; Attendance: 1,500; Referees: Loshak, Shajbakov (UKR)

11 January 2020; 13:00	Odense Håndbold (Denmark)	35–18	(Poland) MKS Perła Lublin	Odense Idrætshal, Odense; Attendance: 1,688; Referees: Ilieva, Karbeska (MKD)
11 January 2020; 13:00	Groot, Offendal 5	(18–13)	Kochaniak, Więckowska 4	Odense Idrætshal, Odense; Attendance: 1,688; Referees: Ilieva, Karbeska (MKD)
11 January 2020; 13:00	3× (yellow card) 3× (suspension)	Report	3× (yellow card) 2× (suspension)	Odense Idrætshal, Odense; Attendance: 1,688; Referees: Ilieva, Karbeska (MKD)

11 January 2020; 17:00	CS Gloria 2018 Bistrița-Năsăud (Romania)	25–25	(Hungary) Érd HC	Sala Polivalentă, Bistrița; Attendance: 970; Referees: Smailagic, Smailagic (SWE)
11 January 2020; 17:00	Dincă 7	(15–11)	Do Nascimento, Jeřábková 6	Sala Polivalentă, Bistrița; Attendance: 970; Referees: Smailagic, Smailagic (SWE)
11 January 2020; 17:00	2× (yellow card) 2× (suspension)	Report	2× (yellow card) 3× (suspension)	Sala Polivalentă, Bistrița; Attendance: 970; Referees: Smailagic, Smailagic (SWE)

18 January 2020; 19:00	Érd HC (Hungary)	29–24	(Poland) MKS Perła Lublin	Érd Aréna, Érd; Attendance: 2,200; Referees: Panayides, Andreou (CYP)
18 January 2020; 19:00	Jeřábková 7	(18–12)	Kochaniak 6	Érd Aréna, Érd; Attendance: 2,200; Referees: Panayides, Andreou (CYP)
18 January 2020; 19:00	3× (yellow card) 3× (suspension)	Report	3× (yellow card) 1× (suspension)	Érd Aréna, Érd; Attendance: 2,200; Referees: Panayides, Andreou (CYP)

19 January 2020; 15:00	Odense Håndbold (Denmark)	25–19	(Romania) CS Gloria 2018 Bistrița-Năsăud	Odense Idrætshal, Odense; Attendance: 1,642; Referees: Butskevich, Butskevich (BLR)
19 January 2020; 15:00	Groot 10	(9–9)	Pristăviță, Vasileuskaya 6	Odense Idrætshal, Odense; Attendance: 1,642; Referees: Butskevich, Butskevich (BLR)
19 January 2020; 15:00	2× (yellow card) 2× (suspension)	Report	2× (yellow card) 6× (suspension)	Odense Idrætshal, Odense; Attendance: 1,642; Referees: Butskevich, Butskevich (BLR)

26 January 2020; 17:00	MKS Perła Lublin (Poland)	23–29	(Hungary) Érd HC	Globus Hall, Lublin; Attendance: 1,400; Referees: Capoccia, Jucker (SUI)
26 January 2020; 17:00	Kochaniak 7	(12–14)	Do Nascimento 8	Globus Hall, Lublin; Attendance: 1,400; Referees: Capoccia, Jucker (SUI)
26 January 2020; 17:00	1× (yellow card) 3× (suspension)	Report	3× (yellow card) 2× (suspension)	Globus Hall, Lublin; Attendance: 1,400; Referees: Capoccia, Jucker (SUI)

26 January 2020; 17:00	CS Gloria 2018 Bistrița-Năsăud (Romania)	25–23	(Denmark) Odense Håndbold	Sala Polivalentă, Bistrița; Attendance: 900; Referees: Hatipoğlu, Şimşek (TUR)
26 January 2020; 17:00	Vasileuskaya 8	(13–12)	Cohrt 7	Sala Polivalentă, Bistrița; Attendance: 900; Referees: Hatipoğlu, Şimşek (TUR)
26 January 2020; 17:00	2× (yellow card) 5× (suspension)	Report	4× (suspension)	Sala Polivalentă, Bistrița; Attendance: 900; Referees: Hatipoğlu, Şimşek (TUR)

1 February 2020; 15:00	Odense Håndbold (Denmark)	31–24	(Hungary) Érd HC	Odense Idrætshal, Odense; Referees: Lončar, Lončar (CRO)
1 February 2020; 15:00	three players 6	(16–9)	Tóth 6	Odense Idrætshal, Odense; Referees: Lončar, Lončar (CRO)
1 February 2020; 15:00	1× (yellow card) 1× (suspension)	Report	1× (yellow card) 1× (suspension)	Odense Idrætshal, Odense; Referees: Lončar, Lončar (CRO)

2 February 2020; 17:00	CS Gloria 2018 Bistrița-Năsăud (Romania)	26–20	(Poland) MKS Perła Lublin	Sala Polivalentă, Bistrița; Attendance: 950; Referees: Šniūrevičius, Grigalionis (LTU)
2 February 2020; 17:00	Vasileuskaya 5	(17–9)	Kochaniak 6	Sala Polivalentă, Bistrița; Attendance: 950; Referees: Šniūrevičius, Grigalionis (LTU)
2 February 2020; 17:00	2× (yellow card) 4× (suspension)	Report	1× (yellow card) 2× (suspension)	Sala Polivalentă, Bistrița; Attendance: 950; Referees: Šniūrevičius, Grigalionis (LTU)

9 February 2020; 17:00	MKS Perła Lublin (Poland)	20–33	(Denmark) Odense Håndbold	Globus Hall, Lublin; Attendance: 2,120; Referees: Jakovljević, Sando (SRB)
9 February 2020; 17:00	Kochaniak 6	(13–14)	Bakkerud 12	Globus Hall, Lublin; Attendance: 2,120; Referees: Jakovljević, Sando (SRB)
9 February 2020; 17:00	1× (yellow card) 2× (suspension)	Report	4× (suspension)	Globus Hall, Lublin; Attendance: 2,120; Referees: Jakovljević, Sando (SRB)

9 February 2020; 17:00	Érd HC (Hungary)	24–24	(Romania) CS Gloria 2018 Bistrița-Năsăud	Érd Aréna, Érd; Attendance: 2,200; Referees: Christidi, Papamattheou (GRE)
9 February 2020; 17:00	Kovačević 6	(12–12)	Rațiu 6	Érd Aréna, Érd; Attendance: 2,200; Referees: Christidi, Papamattheou (GRE)
9 February 2020; 17:00	2× (yellow card) 4× (suspension)	Report	3× (yellow card) 5× (suspension)	Érd Aréna, Érd; Attendance: 2,200; Referees: Christidi, Papamattheou (GRE)

=== Group D ===
Pos	Team	Pld	W	D	L	GF	GA	GD	Pts	Qualification
1	(Denmark) Herning-Ikast Håndbold	6	3	1	2	170	162	+8	7	Knockout stage
2	(Russia) HC Lada	6	3	0	3	177	168	+9	6 (Note: HC Lada 60–59 Storhamar HE)	Knockout stage
3	(Norway) Storhamar HE	6	3	0	3	172	178	−6	6	
4	(Germany) SG BBM Bietigheim	6	2	1	3	167	178	−11	5	

Source: EHF
Notes:

5 January 2020; 15:00	Herning-Ikast Håndbold (Denmark)	34–27	(Norway) Storhamar HE	Ikast-Brande Arena, Ikast; Attendance: 715; Referees: Weijmans, Wolbertus (NED)
5 January 2020; 15:00	Fauske 8	(17–13)	Hovden 10	Ikast-Brande Arena, Ikast; Attendance: 715; Referees: Weijmans, Wolbertus (NED)
5 January 2020; 15:00	2× (yellow card) 1× (suspension)	Report	2× (suspension)	Ikast-Brande Arena, Ikast; Attendance: 715; Referees: Weijmans, Wolbertus (NED)

5 January 2020; 19:00	SG BBM Bietigheim (Germany)	31–29	(Russia) HC Lada	Sporthalle Am Viadukt, Bietigheim-Bissingen; Attendance: 889; Referees: Florescu, Stoia (ROU)
5 January 2020; 19:00	Van der Heijden 6	(17–15)	Mikhaylichenko 11	Sporthalle Am Viadukt, Bietigheim-Bissingen; Attendance: 889; Referees: Florescu, Stoia (ROU)
5 January 2020; 19:00	3× (yellow card) 4× (suspension)	Report	2× (yellow card) 5× (suspension)	Sporthalle Am Viadukt, Bietigheim-Bissingen; Attendance: 889; Referees: Florescu, Stoia (ROU)

11 January 2020; 14:00	HC Lada (Russia)	20–25	(Denmark) Herning-Ikast Håndbold	Sportkomplex USK Olimp, Tolyatti; Attendance: 2,500; Referees: Jakovljević, Sando (SRB)
11 January 2020; 14:00	Mikhaylichenko 8	(11–14)	Johansen, Skogrand 4	Sportkomplex USK Olimp, Tolyatti; Attendance: 2,500; Referees: Jakovljević, Sando (SRB)
11 January 2020; 14:00	3× (yellow card) 3× (suspension)	Report	1× (yellow card) 6× (suspension)	Sportkomplex USK Olimp, Tolyatti; Attendance: 2,500; Referees: Jakovljević, Sando (SRB)

11 January 2020; 16:00	Storhamar HE (Norway)	33–32	(Germany) SG BBM Bietigheim	Boligpartner Arena, Hamar; Attendance: 721; Referees: Lidacka, Lesiak (POL)
11 January 2020; 16:00	Hovden, Venn 9	(18–17)	Kudłacz-Gloc 8	Boligpartner Arena, Hamar; Attendance: 721; Referees: Lidacka, Lesiak (POL)
11 January 2020; 16:00	2× (yellow card) 1× (suspension)	Report	3× (suspension)	Boligpartner Arena, Hamar; Attendance: 721; Referees: Lidacka, Lesiak (POL)

18 January 2020; 19:30	SG BBM Bietigheim (Germany)	26–26	(Denmark) Herning-Ikast Håndbold	Arena Ludwigsburg, Ludwigsburg; Attendance: 1,045; Referees: Mertinian, Syrepisios (GRE)
18 January 2020; 19:30	Kudłacz-Gloc 6	(14–11)	Fauske 9	Arena Ludwigsburg, Ludwigsburg; Attendance: 1,045; Referees: Mertinian, Syrepisios (GRE)
18 January 2020; 19:30	3× (yellow card) 2× (suspension)	Report	3× (yellow card) 4× (suspension) 1× (red card)	Arena Ludwigsburg, Ludwigsburg; Attendance: 1,045; Referees: Mertinian, Syrepisios (GRE)

19 January 2020; 17:00	Storhamar HE (Norway)	28–33	(Russia) HC Lada	Boligpartner Arena, Hamar; Attendance: 1,112; Referees: Kijauskaitė, Žalienė (LTU)
19 January 2020; 17:00	Enkerud, Folkvord 7	(15–19)	Mikhaylichenko 10	Boligpartner Arena, Hamar; Attendance: 1,112; Referees: Kijauskaitė, Žalienė (LTU)
19 January 2020; 17:00	2× (yellow card) 6× (suspension)	Report	1× (yellow card) 5× (suspension)	Boligpartner Arena, Hamar; Attendance: 1,112; Referees: Kijauskaitė, Žalienė (LTU)

25 January 2020; 14:00	Herning-Ikast Håndbold (Denmark)	33–25	(Germany) SG BBM Bietigheim	Ikast-Brande Arena, Ikast; Attendance: 711; Referees: Bíró, Kiss (HUN)
25 January 2020; 14:00	Fauske 7	(19–13)	Aardahl, Loerper 5	Ikast-Brande Arena, Ikast; Attendance: 711; Referees: Bíró, Kiss (HUN)
25 January 2020; 14:00	3× (yellow card) 4× (suspension)	Report	2× (yellow card) 1× (suspension)	Ikast-Brande Arena, Ikast; Attendance: 711; Referees: Bíró, Kiss (HUN)

25 January 2020; 14:00	HC Lada (Russia)	27–31	(Norway) Storhamar HE	Sportkomplex USK Olimp, Tolyatti; Attendance: 2,500; Referees: Aghakishi, Aghakishi (AZE)
25 January 2020; 14:00	Mikhaylichenko 8	(15–14)	Hovden 10	Sportkomplex USK Olimp, Tolyatti; Attendance: 2,500; Referees: Aghakishi, Aghakishi (AZE)
25 January 2020; 14:00	3× (yellow card) 1× (suspension)	Report	2× (yellow card) 3× (suspension)	Sportkomplex USK Olimp, Tolyatti; Attendance: 2,500; Referees: Aghakishi, Aghakishi (AZE)

1 February 2020; 14:00	HC Lada (Russia)	30–25	(Germany) SG BBM Bietigheim	Sportkomplex USK Olimp, Tolyatti; Attendance: 2,500; Referees: Jaškins, Žabko (LAT)
1 February 2020; 14:00	Mikhaylichenko 8	(12–14)	Van der Heijden 6	Sportkomplex USK Olimp, Tolyatti; Attendance: 2,500; Referees: Jaškins, Žabko (LAT)
1 February 2020; 14:00	2× (yellow card) 3× (suspension)	Report	3× (yellow card) 4× (suspension)	Sportkomplex USK Olimp, Tolyatti; Attendance: 2,500; Referees: Jaškins, Žabko (LAT)

2 February 2020; 17:00	Storhamar HE (Norway)	26–24	(Denmark) Herning-Ikast Håndbold	Boligpartner Arena, Hamar; Attendance: 1,474; Referees: Pétursson, Prastarson (ISL)
2 February 2020; 17:00	Enkerud 6	(14–14)	Fauske, Møller 7	Boligpartner Arena, Hamar; Attendance: 1,474; Referees: Pétursson, Prastarson (ISL)
2 February 2020; 17:00	1× (yellow card) 3× (suspension)	Report	1× (yellow card) 4× (suspension) 1× (red card)	Boligpartner Arena, Hamar; Attendance: 1,474; Referees: Pétursson, Prastarson (ISL)

9 February 2020; 15:00	Herning-Ikast Håndbold (Denmark)	28–38	(Russia) HC Lada	Ikast-Brande Arena, Ikast; Attendance: 756; Referees: Sekulić, Kovandić (SRB)
9 February 2020; 15:00	Fauske 8	(12–18)	Kirdiasheva 9	Ikast-Brande Arena, Ikast; Attendance: 756; Referees: Sekulić, Kovandić (SRB)
9 February 2020; 15:00	1× (yellow card) 3× (suspension)	Report	5× (suspension)	Ikast-Brande Arena, Ikast; Attendance: 756; Referees: Sekulić, Kovandić (SRB)

9 February 2020; 17:00	SG BBM Bietigheim (Germany)	28–27	(Norway) Storhamar HE	Arena Ludwigsburg, Ludwigsburg; Attendance: 1,022; Referees: Metalari, Nikolovski (MKD)
9 February 2020; 17:00	Aardahl 5	(16–11)	Hovden, Jakobsen 7	Arena Ludwigsburg, Ludwigsburg; Attendance: 1,022; Referees: Metalari, Nikolovski (MKD)
9 February 2020; 17:00	1× (yellow card) 7× (suspension)	Report	1× (yellow card) 3× (suspension)	Arena Ludwigsburg, Ludwigsburg; Attendance: 1,022; Referees: Metalari, Nikolovski (MKD)
