= Nóra Varsányi =

Hungarian handball player (born 1991)

Personal information
- Full name: Nóra Varsányi
- Nationality: Hungarian
- Born: 3 October 1991 (age 35) Debrecen, Hungary
- Height: 1.65 m (5 ft 5 in)

Sport
- Sport: Handball
- Position: Right Wing

Senior clubs
- Years: Team
- 2005–2007: Nádudvari SE
- 2007–2008: Derecske KK
- 2008–2009: Nyíradony KK
- 2009–2020: Debreceni VSC

Nóra Varsányi (born 3 October 1991 in Debrecen) is a retired Hungarian handballer who played for Debreceni VSC in right wing position until 2020.

== Achievements ==
- Nemzeti Bajnokság I:
  - Silver Medallist: 2011
