= Karolina Kochaniak =

Polish handball player (born 1995)

Personal information
- Full name: Karolina Kochaniak-Sala
- Nationality: Polish
- Born: 5 July 1995 (age 31) Szczecin, Poland
- Height: 1.75 m (5 ft 9 in)

Sport
- Sport: Handball
- Position: Centre back
- Current club: MKS Zagłębie Lubin
- Number: 47

Senior clubs
- Years: Team
- –2019: Pogoń Baltica Szczecin
- 2019–2020: MKS Lublin
- 2020–: Zagłębie Lubin
National team
Years	Team	Apps	(Gls)
2018–	Poland	56	(122)
- Updated on 3 November 2025

Karolina Kochaniak (born 5 July 1995) is a Polish handball player for MKS Zagłębie Lubin and the Polish national team.

== National team ==
She participated at the 2018, 2020 and 2022 European Championships

She also represented Poland at the 2023 World Championship, where Poland finished 16th.

== Club career ==
Kochaniak-Sala played until 2019 for Pogoń Baltica Szczecin. In 2019 she joined MKS Lublin, where she won the 2020 Polish Championship. In 2020 She joined local rivals Zagłębie Lubin. Here she won the Polish Chapmionship 5 years in a row from 2021 to 2025.
