= Anna Kovács =

Hungarian handball player (born 1991)

Personal information
- Nationality: Hungarian
- Born: 24 October 1991 (age 34) Békéscsaba, Hungary
- Height: 1.73 m (5 ft 8 in)

Sport
- Sport: Handball
- Position: Right back
- Current club: Debreceni VSC
- Number: 33

Senior clubs
- Years: Team
- –2010: Békéscsabai ENKSE
- 2010–2015: Érd NK
- 2015–2018: Dunaújvárosi KKA
- 2018–2022: Debreceni VSC
National team
Years	Team	Apps	(Gls)
2011–2019	Hungary	50	(147)
- Updated on 9 December 2019

Anna Kovács (born 24 October 1991) is a retired Hungarian handball player who competed for Debreceni VSC and the Hungarian national team.

She made her debut for the Hungarian national team on 19 October 2011 in a European Championship qualifier against Azerbaijan.
