= 2019–20 Women's EHF Cup =

European handball tournament

Women's EHF Cup
- 2019–20

Tournament information
- Sport: Handball
- Dates: 7 September 2019–~~10 May 2020~~
- Teams: 50 (qualification stage); 16 (group stage)
- Website: eurohandball.com

Final positions
- Champions: cancelled

Tournament statistics
- Top scorer(s): (Russia) Elena Mikhaylichenko (75 goals)

The 2019–20 Women's EHF Cup was the 39th edition of EHF's second-tier women's handball competition. It started on 7 September 2019. Siófok KC were defending champions. On 24 April 2020 EHF announced that the competition would be cancelled due to COVID-19 pandemic.

== Overview ==
=== Team allocation ===
Group stage
(Croatia) Podravka Vegeta	(Poland) MKS Perła Lublin	(Germany) SG BBM Bietigheim	(Czech Republic) DHK Baník Most
Round 3
(Hungary) Siófok KC	(Denmark) Nykøbing Falster	(Hungary) Érd HC	(Russia) HC Lada
(Romania) CS Gloria 2018 Bistrita	(Turkey) Kastamonu Bld. GSK	(Spain) Rocasa Gran Canaria	
Round 2
(Denmark) København Håndbold	(France) OGC Nice Côte d'Azur Handball	(Norway) Storhamar HE	(Denmark) Odense Håndbold
(Hungary) Váci NKSE	(Romania) CS Măgura Cisnădie	(Russia) Kuban	(Germany) TUSSIES Metzingen
(Norway) Tertnes HE	(Denmark) Herning-Ikast Håndbold	(Hungary) DVSC Schaeffler	(Romania) ~~CSM Corona Brașov~~
(Russia) Zvezda Zvenigorod	(Germany) Buxtehuder SV	(France) Nantes Atlantique Handball	(Germany) Thüringer HC
(Norway) Fredrikstad BK	(Serbia) ŽORK Jagodina		
Round 1
(Romania) SCM Craiova	(Russia) HC Astrakhanochka	(Germany) TSV Bayer 04-Werkselfen	(France) ESBF Besançon
(Norway) Byåsen Handball Elite	(Czech Republic) DHC Slavia Prague	(Belarus) HC Gomel	(Spain) Super Amara Bera Bera
(Poland) Metraco Zagłębie Lubin	(Switzerland) LC Brühl Handball	(Turkey) Muratpaşa BSK	(Sweden) Skuru IK
(Austria) WAT Atzgersdorf	(Slovakia) IUVENTA Michalovce	(Azerbaijan) Azeryol HC	(Netherlands) Quintus
(Ukraine) HC Galychanka	(Kosovo) KHF Istogu	(Israel) Maccabi Arazim Ramat Gan	(Cyprus) AC Latsia Nicosia
(Luxembourg) Handball Käerjeng	(Italy) Jomi Salerno	(Portugal) Colégio de Gaia Toyota	(Greece) A.C. PAOK
(North Macedonia) ŽRK Metalurg	(Iceland) Valur	(Finland) HIFK Handboll	(Switzerland) SPONO Eagles
(Austria) Hypo Niederösterreich	(North Macedonia) ŽRK Kumanovo	(Switzerland) LK Zug	(Sweden) H 65 Höör

== Round and draw dates ==
The schedule of the competition was as follows (all draws were held at the EHF headquarters in Vienna, Austria). On 25 March, the EHF announced that no matches will be played before June due to the coronavirus pandemic.

Phase	Round	Draw date	First leg	Second leg
Qualification	First qualifying round	16 July 2019	7–8 September 2019	14–15 September 2019
Qualification	Second qualifying round	16 July 2019	12–13 October 2019	19–20 October 2019
Qualification	Third qualifying round	22 October 2019	9–10 November 2019	16–17 November 2019
Group stage	Matchday 1	21 November 2019	4–5 January 2020	
Group stage	Matchday 2	21 November 2019	11–12 January 2020	
Group stage	Matchday 3	21 November 2019	18–19 January 2020	
Group stage	Matchday 4	21 November 2019	25–26 January 2020	
Group stage	Matchday 5	21 November 2019	1–2 February 2020	
Group stage	Matchday 6	21 November 2019	8–9 February 2020	
Knockout phase	Quarter-finals	11 February 2020	29 February–1 March 2020	7–8 March 2020
Knockout phase	Semi finals	11 February 2020	4–5 April 2020	11–12 April 2020
Knockout phase	Final	14 April 2020	2–3 May 2020	9–10 May 2020

== Qualification stage ==
=== Round 1 ===
There are 32 teams were participating in round 1. The draw seeding pots were composed as follows:

Pot 1	Pot 2
(Romania) SCM Craiova; (Russia) HC Astrakhanochka; (Germany) TSV Bayer 04-Werkselfen; (France) ESBF Besançon; (Norway) Byåsen Handball Elite; (Czech Republic) DHC Slavia Prague; (Belarus) HC Gomel; (Spain) Super Amara Bera Bera; (Poland) Metraco Zagłębie Lubin; (Switzerland) LC Brühl Handball; (Turkey) Muratpaşa BSK; (Sweden) Skuru IK; (Austria) WAT Atzgersdorf; (Slovakia) IUVENTA Michalovce; (Azerbaijan) Azeryol HC; (Netherlands) Quintus	(Ukraine) HC Galychanka; (Kosovo) KHF Istogu; (Israel) Maccabi Arazim Ramat Gan; (Cyprus) AC Latsia Nicosia; (Luxembourg) Handball Käerjeng; (Italy) Jomi Salerno; (Portugal) Colégio de Gaia Toyota; (Greece) A.C. PAOK; (North Macedonia) ŽRK Metalurg; (Iceland) Valur; (Finland) HIFK Handboll; (Switzerland) SPONO Eagles; (Austria) Hypo Niederösterreich; (North Macedonia) ŽRK Kumanovo; (Switzerland) LK Zug; (Sweden) H 65 Höör

The first legs was played on 7–8 and the second legs was played on 14–15 September 2019. Some teams agreed to play both matches in the same venue.

Team 1	Agg.	Team 2	1st leg	2nd leg
HC Gomel (Belarus)	83–35 ^{1}	(Kosovo) KHF Istogu	45–13	38–22
Colégio de Gaia Toyota (Portugal)	32–79	(France) ESBF Besançon	12–37	20–42
Quintus (Netherlands)	45–38 ^{2}	(Finland) HIFK Handboll	28–19	17–19
Super Amara Bera Bera (Spain)	75–47 ^{3}	(Switzerland) LK Zug	30–16	45–31
ŽRK Kumanovo (North Macedonia)	51–54 ^{4}	(Czech Republic) DHC Slavia Prague	27–23	24–31
H 65 Höör (Sweden)	75–43 ^{5}	(Switzerland) LC Brühl Handball	32–24	43–19
TSV Bayer 04-Werkselfen (Germany)	76–10 ^{6}	(Cyprus) AC Latsia Nicosia	40–5	36–5
HC Astrakhanochka (Russia)	61–34 ^{7}	(Israel) Maccabi Arazim Ramat Gan	31–18	30–16
HC Galychanka (Ukraine)	49–42 ^{8}	(Azerbaijan) Azeryol HC	26–24	23–18
SCM Craiova (Romania)	59–38 ^{9}	(Italy) Jomi Salerno	30–21	29–17
IUVENTA Michalovce (Slovakia)	63–50 ^{10}	(Switzerland) SPONO Eagles	31–25	32–25
Handball Käerjeng (Luxembourg)	25–86 ^{11}	(Norway) Byåsen Handball Elite	13–40	12–46
Skuru IK (Sweden)	53–47 ^{12}	(Iceland) Valur	22–23	31–24
A.C. PAOK (Greece)	56–49 ^{13}	(Turkey) Muratpaşa BSK	32–25	24–24
ŽRK Metalurg (North Macedonia)	28–87 ^{14}	(Poland) Metraco Zagłębie Lubin	14–44	14–43
Hypo Niederösterreich (Austria)	41–31	(Austria) WAT Atzgersdorf	22–17	19–14

Notes

^{1} Both legs were hosted by HC Gomel.
^{2} Both legs were hosted by Quintus.
^{3} Both legs were hosted by Super Amara Bera Bera.
^{4} Both legs were hosted by ŽRK Kumanovo.
^{5} Both legs were hosted by H 65 Höör.
^{6} Both legs were hosted by TSV Bayer 04-Werkselfen.
^{7} Both legs were hosted by HC Astrakhanochka.
^{8} Both legs were hosted by HC Galychanka.
^{9} Both legs were hosted by SCM Craiova.
^{10} Both legs were hosted by IUVENTA Michalovce.
^{11} Both legs were hosted by Byåsen Handball Elite.
^{12} Both legs were hosted by Valur.
^{13} Both legs were hosted by A.C. PAOK.
^{14} Both legs were hosted by Metraco Zagłębie Lubin.

=== Round 2 ===
There were 34 teams participating in round 2. 16 teams who qualified from round 1 and 18 teams joining the draw. The first legs were played on 12–13 October and the second legs were played on 19–20 October 2019.

Team 1	Agg.	Team 2	1st leg	2nd leg
A.C. PAOK (Greece)	44–49	(Serbia) ŽORK Jagodina	25–23	19–26
Quintus (Netherlands)	39–66 ^{1}	(France) Nantes Atlantique HB	21–30	18–36
DHC Slavia Prague (Czech Republic)	39–72 ^{2}	(Denmark) Odense Håndbold	25–34	14–38
H 65 Höör (Sweden)	55–59	(Russia) Kuban	28–26	27–33
~~CSM Corona Brașov~~ (Romania)	67–63	(Spain) Super Amara Bera Bera	35–30	32–33
IUVENTA Michalovce (Slovakia)	44–48	(France) OGC Nice Côte d'Azur Handball	21–23	23–25
ESBF Besançon (France)	60–56	(Norway) Fredrikstad BK	29–27	31–29
Herning-Ikast Håndbold (Denmark)	54–46 ^{3}	(Belarus) HC Gomel	33–21	21–25
Metraco Zagłębie Lubin (Poland)	42–65	(Norway) Storhamar HE	22–38	20–27
Buxtehuder SV (Germany)	40–53	(Russia) HC Astrakhanochka	25–30	15–23
Zvezda Zvenigorod (Russia)	53–44	(Sweden) Skuru IK	29–22	24–22
Váci NKSE (Hungary)	56–45	(Austria) Hypo Niederösterreich	26–22	30–23
Thüringer HC (Germany)	58–49	(Norway) Byåsen Handball Elite	29–25	29–24
DVSC Schaeffler (Hungary)	69–58	(Germany) TSV Bayer 04-Werkselfen	35–27	34–31
CS Măgura Cisnădie (Romania)	45–42	(Ukraine) HC Galychanka	31–23	14–19
Tertnes Bergen (Norway)	57–46 ^{4}	(Romania) SCM Craiova	24–26	33–20
TUSSIES Metzingen (Germany)	53–56	(Denmark) København Håndbold	30–22	23–34

Notes

^{1} Both legs were hosted by Nantes Atlantique HB.
^{2} Both legs were hosted by Odense Håndbold.
^{3} Both legs were hosted by HC Gomel.
^{4} Both legs were hosted by SCM Craiova.

=== Round 3 ===
A total of 24 teams entered the draw for the third qualification round, which was held on Tuesday, 22 October 2019. The draw seeding pots were composed as follows:

Pot 1	Pot 2
(Denmark) Nykøbing Falster Håndbold; (Denmark) Odense Håndbold; (Spain) Rocasa Gran Canaria; (France) OGC Nice Côte d'Azur Handball; (Germany) Thüringer HC; (Hungary) Érd HC; (Hungary) Siófok KC; (Norway) Storhamar HE; (Romania) CS Gloria 2018 Bistrita; (Russia) HC Lada; (Serbia) ŽORK Jagodina; (Turkey) Kastamonu Bld. GSK	(Denmark) Herning-Ikast Håndbold; (Denmark) København Håndbold; (France) ESBF Besançon; (France) Nantes Atlantique HB; (Hungary) DVSC Schaeffler; (Hungary) Váci NKSE; (Norway) Tertnes HE; (Romania) |~~CSM Corona Brașov~~; (Romania) CS Măgura Cisnădie; (Russia) HC Astrakhanochka; (Russia) Zvezda Zvenigorod; (Russia) Kuban

The first legs were played on 9–10 November and the second legs were played on 16–17 November 2019.

Team 1	Agg.	Team 2	1st leg	2nd leg
Odense Håndbold (Denmark)	57–52	(France) ESBF Besançon	25–23	32–29
Tertnes HE (Norway)	44–65	(Norway) Storhamar HE	31–26	13–39
Rocasa Gran Canaria (Spain)	46–46 (a)	(Romania) CS Măgura Cisnădie	28–24	18–22
HC Astrakhanochka (Russia)	53–55	(Germany) Thüringer HC	28–25	25–30
Érd HC (Hungary)	64–62	(Russia) Kuban	39–32	25–30
Kastamonu Bld. GSK (Turkey)	58–56	(Hungary) Váci NKSE	33–26	25–30
DVSC Schaeffler (Hungary)	73–52	(Serbia) ŽORK Jagodina	37–26	36–26
CS Gloria 2018 Bistrita (Romania)	49–49	(Romania) ~~CSM Corona Brașov~~	25–27	24–22
Nantes Atlantique HB (France)	58–61	(Hungary) Siófok KC	24–32	34–29
Zvezda Zvenigorod (Russia)	52–70	(Russia) HC Lada	24–36	28–34
Nykøbing Falster Håndbold (Denmark)	44–49	(Denmark) Herning-Ikast Håndbold	23–23	26–31
København Håndbold (Denmark)	62–46	(France) OGC Nice Côte d'Azur Handball	32–23	30–23

Notes

1. Corona Brasov had been suspended from EHF competitions after players of the club were presumed to have participated in an intravenous laser therapy session considered a prohibited method under Section M1.3 of the 2019 Prohibited List of the World Anti-Doping Code.

== Group stage ==
The draw for the group phase will be held on Thursday, 21 November 2019. In each group, teams played against each other in a double round-robin format, with home and away matches.

Tiebreakers
In the group stage, teams were ranked according to points (2 points for a win, 1 point for a draw, 0 points for a loss). After completion of the group stage, if two or more teams have scored the same number of points, the ranking will be determined as follows:
1. Highest number of points in matches between the teams directly involved;
2. Superior goal difference in matches between the teams directly involved;
3. Highest number of goals scored in matches between the teams directly involved (or in the away match in case of a two-team tie);
4. Superior goal difference in all matches of the group;
5. Highest number of plus goals in all matches of the group;

If the ranking of one of these teams is determined, the above criteria are consecutively followed until the ranking of all teams is determined. If no ranking can be determined, a decision shall be obtained by EHF through drawing of lots.

During the group stage, only criteria 4–5 apply to determine the provisional ranking of teams.

=== Group A ===
Pos	Team	Pld	W	D	L	GF	GA	GD	Pts	Qualification	THU	KAS	SCH	BAN
1	(Germany) Thüringer HC	6	6	0	0	184	141	+43	12	Knockout stage	—	27–24	26–23	40–24
2	(Turkey) Kastamonu Bld. GSK	6	3	0	3	176	175	+1	6 (Note: Kastamonu Bld. GSK 64–63 DVSC Schaeffler)	Knockout stage	24–30	—	30–31	33–27
3	(Hungary) DVSC Schaeffler	6	3	0	3	170	173	−3	6		19–26	32–34	—	36–29
4	(Czech Republic) DHK Baník Most	6	0	0	6	163	204	−41	0		27–35	28–31	28–29	—

Source: EHF

=== Group B ===
Pos	Team	Pld	W	D	L	GF	GA	GD	Pts	Qualification	SIO	POD	KOB	MAG
1	(Hungary) Siófok KC	6	4	2	0	192	158	+34	10	Knockout stage	—	30–30	36–23	34–22
2	(Croatia) Podravka Vegeta	6	3	2	1	189	176	+13	8	Knockout stage	33–33	—	29–32	38–26
3	(Denmark) København Håndbold	6	3	0	3	174	171	+3	6		27–28	26–28	—	33–22
4	(Romania) CS Măgura Cisnădie	6	0	0	6	150	200	−50	0		23–31	29–31	28–33	—

Source: EHF

=== Group C ===
Pos	Team	Pld	W	D	L	GF	GA	GD	Pts	Qualification	ODE	GLO	ERD	LUB
1	(Denmark) Odense Håndbold	6	5	0	1	175	133	+42	10	Knockout stage	—	25–19	31–24	35–18
2	(Romania) CS Gloria 2018 Bistrița-Năsăud	6	2	3	1	141	139	+2	7	Knockout stage	25–23	—	25–25	26–20
3	(Hungary) Érd HC	6	2	2	2	158	155	+3	6		27–28	24–24	—	29–24
4	(Poland) MKS Perła Lublin	6	0	1	5	127	174	−47	1		20–33	22–22	23–29	—

Source: EHF

=== Group D ===
Pos	Team	Pld	W	D	L	GF	GA	GD	Pts	Qualification	HER	LAD	STO	BIE
1	(Denmark) Herning-Ikast Håndbold	6	3	1	2	170	162	+8	7	Knockout stage	—	28–38	34–27	33–25
2	(Russia) HC Lada	6	3	0	3	177	168	+9	6 (Note: HC Lada 60–59 Storhamar HE)	Knockout stage	20–25	—	27–31	30–25
3	(Norway) Storhamar HE	6	3	0	3	172	178	−6	6		26–24	28–33	—	33–32
4	(Germany) SG BBM Bietigheim	6	2	1	3	167	178	−11	5		26–26	31–29	28–27	—

Source: EHF

== Quarterfinals ==
The seedings were announced on 10 February 2020:

Pot 1	Pot 2
(Denmark) Herning-Ikast Håndbold (Denmark) Odense Håndbold (Germany) Thüringer HC (Hungary) Siófok KC	(Croatia) Podravka Vegeta (Romania) CS Gloria 2018 Bistrița-Năsăud (Russia) HC Lada (Turkey) Kastamonu Bld. GSK

The draw event was held at the EHF Office in Vienna on Tuesday 11 February 2020. The draw determined the quarter-final and also the semi-final pairings. Teams from the same group of the group phase could not meet in the next stage.

The first quarter-final leg was scheduled for 29 February–1 March 2020, while the second leg followed one week later.

Team 1	Agg.	Team 2	1st leg	2nd leg
Kastamonu Bld. GSK (Turkey)	49–78	(Hungary) Siófok KC	29–38	20–40
CS Gloria 2018 Bistrița-Năsăud (Romania)	52–57	(Denmark) Herning-Ikast Håndbold	26–29	26–28
HC Lada (Russia)	61–62	(Denmark) Odense Håndbold	31–28	30–34
HC Podravka Vegeta (Croatia)	61–51	(Germany) Thüringer HC	27–23	34–28

=== Matches ===
1 March 2020; 15:00	Kastamonu Bld. GSK (Turkey)	29–38	(Hungary) Siófok KC	Atatürk Sports Hall, Kastamonu; Attendance: 1,750; Referees: Xhema, Jahja (KOS)
1 March 2020; 15:00	İskit 10	(12–24)	Aoustin 8	Atatürk Sports Hall, Kastamonu; Attendance: 1,750; Referees: Xhema, Jahja (KOS)
1 March 2020; 15:00	3× (yellow card) 3× (suspension)	Report	1× (yellow card) 1× (suspension)	Atatürk Sports Hall, Kastamonu; Attendance: 1,750; Referees: Xhema, Jahja (KOS)

7 March 2020; 18:00	Siófok KC (Hungary)	40–20	(Turkey) Kastamonu Bld. GSK	Kiss Szilárd Sportcsarnok, Siófok; Attendance: 1,185; Referees: Braseth, Sundet (NOR)
7 March 2020; 18:00	Hársfalvi, Ježić 6	(19–10)	İskenderoğlu, Özel 6	Kiss Szilárd Sportcsarnok, Siófok; Attendance: 1,185; Referees: Braseth, Sundet (NOR)
7 March 2020; 18:00	1× (yellow card) 2× (suspension)	Report	1× (yellow card) 5× (suspension)	Kiss Szilárd Sportcsarnok, Siófok; Attendance: 1,185; Referees: Braseth, Sundet (NOR)

Siófok KC won 78–49 on aggregate.

1 March 2020; 17:00	CS Gloria 2018 Bistrița-Năsăud (Romania)	26–29	(Denmark) Herning-Ikast Håndbold	Sala Polivalentă, Bistrița; Attendance: 950; Referees: Tzaferopoulos, Bethmann (GRE)
1 March 2020; 17:00	Ardean-Elisei 9	(13–10)	Fauske, Friis 7	Sala Polivalentă, Bistrița; Attendance: 950; Referees: Tzaferopoulos, Bethmann (GRE)
1 March 2020; 17:00	3× (yellow card) 1× (suspension)	Report	2× (yellow card) 4× (suspension)	Sala Polivalentă, Bistrița; Attendance: 950; Referees: Tzaferopoulos, Bethmann (GRE)

8 March 2020; 15:30	Herning-Ikast Håndbold (Denmark)	28–26	(Romania) CS Gloria 2018 Bistrița-Năsăud	Ikast-Brande Arena, Ikast; Referees: Mitrović, Kažanegra (MNE)
8 March 2020; 15:30	Kristiansen 9	(12–15)	Dincă 7	Ikast-Brande Arena, Ikast; Referees: Mitrović, Kažanegra (MNE)
8 March 2020; 15:30	2× (yellow card) 4× (suspension)	Report	1× (yellow card) 3× (suspension)	Ikast-Brande Arena, Ikast; Referees: Mitrović, Kažanegra (MNE)

Herning-Ikast Håndbold won 57–52 on aggregate.

29 February 2020; 14:00	HC Lada (Russia)	31–28	(Denmark) Odense Håndbold	Sportkomplex USK Olimp, Tolyatti; Attendance: 2,350; Referees: Năstase, Stancu (ROU)
29 February 2020; 14:00	Shamanouskaya 8	(15–14)	Bakkerud 7	Sportkomplex USK Olimp, Tolyatti; Attendance: 2,350; Referees: Năstase, Stancu (ROU)
29 February 2020; 14:00	2× (yellow card) 3× (suspension)	Report	3× (yellow card) 3× (suspension)	Sportkomplex USK Olimp, Tolyatti; Attendance: 2,350; Referees: Năstase, Stancu (ROU)

8 March 2020; 15:00	Odense Håndbold (Denmark)	34–30	(Russia) HC Lada	Odense Idrætshal, Odense; Attendance: 0 Referees: Di Domenico, Fornasier (ITA)
8 March 2020; 15:00	Bakkerud 7	(20–16)	Kirdiasheva, Shamanouskaya 6	Odense Idrætshal, Odense; Attendance: 0 Referees: Di Domenico, Fornasier (ITA)
8 March 2020; 15:00	2× (yellow card) 1× (suspension)	Report	3× (yellow card) 3× (suspension)	Odense Idrætshal, Odense; Attendance: 0 Referees: Di Domenico, Fornasier (ITA)

Odense Håndbold won 62–61 on aggregate.

1 March 2020; 15:00	HC Podravka Vegeta (Croatia)	27–23	(Germany) Thüringer HC	Sports Hall "Fran Galović", Koprivnica; Attendance: 2,080; Referees: Alpaidze, Berezkina (RUS)
1 March 2020; 15:00	Tsàkalou 9	(15–12)	Lopes, Scheffknecht 6	Sports Hall "Fran Galović", Koprivnica; Attendance: 2,080; Referees: Alpaidze, Berezkina (RUS)
1 March 2020; 15:00	2× (yellow card) 6× (suspension)	Report	1× (yellow card) 4× (suspension)	Sports Hall "Fran Galović", Koprivnica; Attendance: 2,080; Referees: Alpaidze, Berezkina (RUS)

8 March 2020; 14:00	Thüringer HC (Germany)	28–34	(Croatia) HC Podravka Vegeta	Wiedigsburghalle, Nordhausen; Attendance: 1,300; Referees: Budzák, Záhradník (SVK)
8 March 2020; 14:00	Bölk 9	(15–17)	Mugoša, Tsàkalou 6	Wiedigsburghalle, Nordhausen; Attendance: 1,300; Referees: Budzák, Záhradník (SVK)
8 March 2020; 14:00	1× (yellow card) 3× (suspension)	Report	3× (yellow card) 5× (suspension)	Wiedigsburghalle, Nordhausen; Attendance: 1,300; Referees: Budzák, Záhradník (SVK)

HC Podravka Vegeta won 61–51 on aggregate.

== Final four ==
The semi-finals first legs were scheduled on 4–5 April 2020, while the second leg was scheduled for 11–12 April 2020, but the European Handball Federation announced on 13 March 2020, that the Semi-final matches will not be held as scheduled due to the ongoing developments in the spread of COVID-19 across Europe. On 25 March, the EHF announced that no matches will be played before June due to the coronavirus pandemic and Women's EHF Cup is foreseen to be played in an EHF FINAL4 format in one venue over two playing days. On 24 April 2020 the matches were cancelled.

=== Bracket ===
Semifinals

Final
Third place

=== Semifinals ===
Odense Håndbold (Denmark)	Cancelled	(Hungary) Siófok KC

Herning-Ikast Håndbold (Denmark)	Cancelled	(Croatia) HC Podravka Vegeta

=== Third place game ===
LSF1	Cancelled	LSF2

=== Final ===
WSF1	Cancelled	WSF2

== Top goalscorers ==
As of 8 March 2020

Rank	Player	Club	Goals
1	(Russia) Elena Mikhaylichenko	(Russia) HC Lada	75
2	(Norway) Helene Gigstad Fauske	(Denmark) Herning-Ikast Håndbold	71
3	(Turkey) Aslı İskit	(Turkey) Kastamonu Bld. GSK	68

== See also ==
- 2019–20 Women's EHF Champions League
- 2019–20 Women's EHF Challenge Cup
