= Jelena Despotović =

Montenegrin handball player (born 1994)

Personal information
- Nationality: Montenegrin
- Born: 30 April 1994 (age 32) Podgorica, Montenegro, FR Yugoslavia
- Height: 1.83 m (6 ft 0 in)

Sport
- Sport: Handball
- Position: Left back
- Current club: Budućnost Podgorica
- Number: 80

Senior clubs
- Years: Team
- 2010–2011: Budućnost Podgorica
- 2011–2012: ŽRK Biseri
- 2012–2015: Budućnost Podgorica
- 2015–2017: Debreceni VSC
- 2017: RK Krim
- 2017–2021: Debreceni VSC
- 2021–2023: Győri ETO KC
- 2023: Ferencvárosi TC
- 2023–: Budućnost Podgorica
National team
Years	Team	Apps	(Gls)
2012–2025	Montenegro	112	(178)
Medal record
European Championship
Gold medal – first place	2012 Serbia
Mediterranean Games
Silver medal – second place	2018 Tarragona	Team

Jelena Radivojević, née Despotović (born 30 April 1994) is a Montenegrin handball player for Budućnost Podgorica and the Montenegrin national team.

She won the EHF Champions League trophy with Budućnost in the 2014–15 season.

== Personal life ==
Her partner is Bogdan Radivojević handball player. Their daughter Helena was born in August 2022.
