= 2019–20 Győri ETO KC season =

Győri Audi ETO KC
2019–20 season
- Chairman: Dr. Csaba Bartha
- Manager: Gábor Danyi
Home colours	Away colours

The 2019–20 season was Győri Audi ETO KC's 40th competitive and consecutive season in the Nemzeti Bajnokság I and 72nd year in existence as a handball club. The season got cancelled due to the COVID-19 pandemic.

== Players ==
=== Squad information ===
Goalkeepers

- 12 (France) Amandine Leynaud
- 16 (Slovakia) Nikolett Tóth
- 73 (Hungary) Éva Kiss
- 85 (Norway) Kari Aalvik Grimsbø

Left Wingers

- 13 (Hungary) Anita Görbicz (c)
- 23 (Hungary) Csenge Fodor
- 57 (Hungary) Szidónia Puhalák

Right Wingers

- 3 (Czech Republic) Jana Knedlíková
- 33 (Hungary) Bernadett Bódi
- 48 (Hungary) Dorottya Faluvégi

Line players

- 2 (France) Béatrice Edwige
- 7 (Norway) Kari Brattset Dale
- 19 (Hungary) Diána Világos

Left Backs

- 8 (Denmark) Anne Mette Hansen
- 18 (Brazil) Eduarda Amorim
- 21 (Norway) Veronica Kristiansen

Centre Backs

- 15 (Norway) Stine Bredal Oftedal
- 20 (Hungary) Johanna Farkas
- 27 (France) Estelle Nze Minko

Right Backs

- 5 (Hungary) Laura Kürthi
- 24 (Norway) Amanda Kurtović
- 32 (Montenegro) Katarina Bulatović

=== Transfers ===
Source: hetmeteres.hu

In:

- (Montenegro) Katarina Bulatović (from (Montenegro) Budućnost)
- (France) Béatrice Edwige (from (France) Metz)
- Dorottya Faluvégi (from Ferencváros)
- (Norway) Amanda Kurtović (from (Romania) CSM București)
- (France) Estelle Nze Minko (from Siófok)

Out:

- Sára Afentaler (loan to Alba Fehérvár)
- Boglárka Binó (loan to Vasas)
- (Netherlands) Nycke Groot (to (Denmark) Odense)
- Júlia Hársfalvi (to Siófok)
- Dóra Kellermann (loan to Mosonmagyaróvár)
- Dorina Korsós (loan return to (Germany) TuS Metzingen)
- Rita Lakatos (loan return to Vác)
- (Norway) Nora Mørk (to (Romania) CSM București)
- Tamara Pál (loan to MTK Budapest)
- (Romania) Crina Pintea (to (Romania) CSM București)
- Zsuzsanna Tomori (to Siófok)
- Gabriella Tóth (loan return to Érd)

== Club ==
=== Technical Staff ===
Position	Staff member
President	(Hungary) Dr. Csaba Bartha
Technical manager	(Hungary) Péter Molnár
Head coach	(Hungary) Gábor Danyi
Assistant coaches	(Croatia) Zdravko Zovko
Team doctor	(Hungary) Dr. Péter Balogh
Team doctor	(Hungary) Dr. László Szálasy
Masseur	(Hungary) Tamás Molnár
Physiotherapist	(Hungary) Ádám Devecseri
Physiotherapist	(Hungary) Viktória Ringhoffer
Conditioning coach	(Hungary) Zoltán Holanek
Video Analytics	(Hungary) Attila Kun

Source: Coaches, Management

=== Uniform ===
- Supplier: Adidas
- Main sponsor: Audi / tippmix / OTP Bank / City of Győr
- Back sponsor: PannErgy / Győrszol
- Shorts sponsor: OMV / Leier / OIL!

== Competitions ==
=== Overview ===
Win Draw Loss

Competition	First match	Last match	Starting round	Final position	Record							
Competition	First match	Last match	Starting round	Final position	Pld	W	D	L	GF	GA	GD	Win %
Nemzeti Bajnokság I	1 September 2019	23 May 2020	Matchday 1	Matchday 26	16	15	0	1	537	381	+156	93.75
Magyar Kupa	8 April 2020	-	Fifth round	-	0	0	0	0	0	0	+0	—
EHF Champions League	6 October 2019	-	Group stage	-	6	6	0	0	216	147	+69	100.00
Total					22	21	0	1	753	528	+225	95.45

Last updated: 22 January 2020
Source: Competitions

=== Nemzeti Bajnokság I ===
==== League table ====
Pos	Team	Pld	W	D	L	GF	GA	GD	Pts
1	Győri Audi ETO KC	20	19	0	1	713	483	+230	38
2	Siófok KC	18	15	1	2	608	427	+181	31
3	FTC-Rail Cargo Hungaria	18	13	3	2	579	454	+125	29
4	DVSC SCHAEFFLER	18	11	3	4	560	514	+46	25
5	Váci NKSE	19	11	2	6	559	533	+26	24

Updated to match(es) played on 21 April 2020. Source: mksz.hu
Rules for classification: 1) Points; 2) Goal difference; 3) Head-to-head points; 4) Head-to-head goal difference; 5) Goals scored; 6) Matches won; 7) Draw (Note: Head-to-head record is used only after all the matches between the teams in question have been played)

==== Results by round ====
Match	1	2	3	4	5	6	7	8	9	10	11	12	13	14	15	16	17	18	19	20	21	22	23	24	25	26
Ground	H	H	A	H	H	A	H	A	A	H	A	A	H	A	H	A	A	H	A	H	A	H	A	H	H	A
Result	W	W	W	W	W	W	W	W	W	W	W	W	W	W	W	L	W	W	W	W						

Updated to match(es) played on 5 March 2020. Source: Matches
A = Away; H = Home; W = Win; D = Draw; L = Loss

==== Matches ====
Round 1; 1 September 2019; 16:30	Győri Audi ETO KC	27–24	Siófok KC	Audi Aréna, Győr; Attendance: 4,874; Referees: Bíró, Kiss
Round 1; 1 September 2019; 16:30	Hansen 6	(17–13)	Aoustin 7	Audi Aréna, Győr; Attendance: 4,874; Referees: Bíró, Kiss
Round 1; 1 September 2019; 16:30	1× (yellow card) 1× (suspension)	Report	1× (yellow card) 3× (suspension)	Audi Aréna, Győr; Attendance: 4,874; Referees: Bíró, Kiss

Round 2; 6 September 2019; 18:00	Győri Audi ETO KC	33–22	Szent István SE	Audi Aréna, Győr; Attendance: 2,543; Referees: Fekete, Tóth
Round 2; 6 September 2019; 18:00	Brattset 6	(17–10)	Scheffer 8	Audi Aréna, Győr; Attendance: 2,543; Referees: Fekete, Tóth
Round 2; 6 September 2019; 18:00	3× (yellow card) 2× (suspension)	Report	1× (yellow card) 4× (suspension)	Audi Aréna, Győr; Attendance: 2,543; Referees: Fekete, Tóth

Round 3; 13 September 2019; 18:30	Alba Fehérvár KC	22–28	Győri Audi ETO KC	KÖFÉM Sports Hall, Székesfehérvár; Attendance: 800; Referees: Hantos, Rózsahegyi
Round 3; 13 September 2019; 18:30	Mendy, Walfisch 6	(9–13)	Nze Minko 7	KÖFÉM Sports Hall, Székesfehérvár; Attendance: 800; Referees: Hantos, Rózsahegyi
Round 3; 13 September 2019; 18:30	2× (yellow card) 1× (suspension)	Report	2× (yellow card) 4× (suspension)	KÖFÉM Sports Hall, Székesfehérvár; Attendance: 800; Referees: Hantos, Rózsahegyi

Round 4; 18 September 2019; 18:00	Győri Audi ETO KC	33–24	Váci NKSE	Audi Aréna, Győr; Attendance: 2,744; Referees: Marton, Szabó
Round 4; 18 September 2019; 18:00	Nze Minko 8	(16–15)	Kácsor 8	Audi Aréna, Győr; Attendance: 2,744; Referees: Marton, Szabó
Round 4; 18 September 2019; 18:00	1× (suspension)	Report	1× (yellow card) 4× (suspension)	Audi Aréna, Győr; Attendance: 2,744; Referees: Marton, Szabó

Round 5; 9 October 2019; 18:00	EUbility Group-Békéscsaba	19–30	Győri Audi ETO KC	Municipal Sports Hall, Békéscsaba; Attendance: 1,500; Referees: Rontó, Szanyi
Round 5; 9 October 2019; 18:00	Kopecz 6	(10–13)	Oftedal 7	Municipal Sports Hall, Békéscsaba; Attendance: 1,500; Referees: Rontó, Szanyi
Round 5; 9 October 2019; 18:00	1× (yellow card) 4× (suspension)	Report	1× (suspension)	Municipal Sports Hall, Békéscsaba; Attendance: 1,500; Referees: Rontó, Szanyi

Round 6; 16 October 2019; 20:00	Győri Audi ETO KC	39–28	Érd	Audi Aréna, Győr; Attendance: 3,565; Referees: Andorka, Hucker
Round 6; 16 October 2019; 20:00	Brattset 10	(22–16)	Tóth 7	Audi Aréna, Győr; Attendance: 3,565; Referees: Andorka, Hucker
Round 6; 16 October 2019; 20:00	2× (yellow card) 2× (suspension)	Report	2× (yellow card) 2× (suspension)	Audi Aréna, Győr; Attendance: 3,565; Referees: Andorka, Hucker

Round 7; 25 October 2019; 18:00	Dunaújvárosi Kohász KA	21–34	Győri Audi ETO KC	Municipal Sports Hall, Szekszárd; Attendance: 850; Referees: Kovács-Sebők, Réti
Round 7; 25 October 2019; 18:00	Szalai 6	(12–17)	Oftedal 8	Municipal Sports Hall, Szekszárd; Attendance: 850; Referees: Kovács-Sebők, Réti
Round 7; 25 October 2019; 18:00	2× (yellow card) 2× (suspension)	Report	2× (yellow card) 4× (suspension)	Municipal Sports Hall, Szekszárd; Attendance: 850; Referees: Kovács-Sebők, Réti

Round 8; 2 October 2019; 18:00	Győri Audi ETO KC	38–21	MTK Budapest	Audi Aréna, Győr; Attendance: 2,279; Referees: Földesi, Halász
Round 8; 2 October 2019; 18:00	Hansen 8	(18–15)	Tóth 7	Audi Aréna, Győr; Attendance: 2,279; Referees: Földesi, Halász
Round 8; 2 October 2019; 18:00	2× (yellow card) 1× (suspension)	Report	1× (yellow card) 4× (suspension) 1× (red card)	Audi Aréna, Győr; Attendance: 2,279; Referees: Földesi, Halász

Round 9; 6 November 2019; 18:30	Motherson-Mosonmagyaróvár	21–35	Győri Audi ETO KC	UFM Aréna, Mosonmagyaróvár; Attendance: 1,100; Referees: Marton, Szabó
Round 9; 6 November 2019; 18:30	Popa 4	(7–17)	Oftedal, Nze Minko 6	UFM Aréna, Mosonmagyaróvár; Attendance: 1,100; Referees: Marton, Szabó
Round 9; 6 November 2019; 18:30	4× (suspension)	Report	3× (yellow card) 2× (suspension)	UFM Aréna, Mosonmagyaróvár; Attendance: 1,100; Referees: Marton, Szabó

Round 10; 12 November 2019; 18:00	Győri Audi ETO KC	36–28	DVSC Schaeffler	Audi Aréna, Győr; Attendance: 3,479; Referees: Medve, Südi
Round 10; 12 November 2019; 18:00	Oftedal 8	(20–13)	three players 4	Audi Aréna, Győr; Attendance: 3,479; Referees: Medve, Südi
Round 10; 12 November 2019; 18:00	1× (yellow card) 4× (suspension)	Report	1× (yellow card) 2× (suspension)	Audi Aréna, Győr; Attendance: 3,479; Referees: Medve, Südi

Round 11; 29 December 2019; 18:00	FTC-Rail Cargo Hungaria	27–28	Győri Audi ETO KC	Elek Gyula Aréna, Budapest; Attendance: 1,200; Referees: Horváth, Marton
Round 11; 29 December 2019; 18:00	Klujber, Kovacsics 6	(13–12)	Oftedal 6	Elek Gyula Aréna, Budapest; Attendance: 1,200; Referees: Horváth, Marton
Round 11; 29 December 2019; 18:00	2× (yellow card) 4× (suspension)	Report	3× (yellow card) 2× (suspension)	Elek Gyula Aréna, Budapest; Attendance: 1,200; Referees: Horváth, Marton

Round 12; 12 January 2020; 18:00	Hungast-Szombathelyi KKA	27–41	Győri Audi ETO KC	Arena Savaria, Szombathely; Attendance: 3,000; Referees: Földesi, Halász
Round 12; 12 January 2020; 18:00	three players 4	(13–21)	Kristiansen, Oftedal 6	Arena Savaria, Szombathely; Attendance: 3,000; Referees: Földesi, Halász
Round 12; 12 January 2020; 18:00	2× (yellow card) 3× (suspension)	Report	2× (yellow card) 5× (suspension)	Arena Savaria, Szombathely; Attendance: 3,000; Referees: Földesi, Halász

Round 13; 18 January 2020; 18:00	Győri Audi ETO KC	45–19	Kisvárda Master Good SE	Audi Aréna, Győr; Attendance: 3,561; Referees: Héjja, Kónya
Round 13; 18 January 2020; 18:00	Fodor 7	(21–10)	Milanović-Litre, Premović 4	Audi Aréna, Győr; Attendance: 3,561; Referees: Héjja, Kónya
Round 13; 18 January 2020; 18:00	2× (yellow card) 4× (suspension)	Report	1× (yellow card) 8× (suspension) 1× (red card)	Audi Aréna, Győr; Attendance: 3,561; Referees: Héjja, Kónya

Round 14; 22 January 2020; 18:00	Siófok KC	34–29	Győri Audi ETO KC	Szilárd Kiss Sports Hall, Siófok; Attendance: 1,185; Referees: Hargitai, Markó
Round 14; 22 January 2020; 18:00	four players 5	(21–12)	Nze Minko 5	Szilárd Kiss Sports Hall, Siófok; Attendance: 1,185; Referees: Hargitai, Markó
Round 14; 22 January 2020; 18:00	2× (yellow card) 5× (suspension)	Report	2× (yellow card) 4× (suspension)	Szilárd Kiss Sports Hall, Siófok; Attendance: 1,185; Referees: Hargitai, Markó

Round 15; 4 February 2020; 18:00	Szent István SE	23–47	Győri Audi ETO KC	Municipal Sports Hall, Monor; Attendance: 910; Referees: Hantos, Rózsahegyi
Round 15; 4 February 2020; 18:00	Monori 5	(10–24)	Oftedal 10	Municipal Sports Hall, Monor; Attendance: 910; Referees: Hantos, Rózsahegyi
Round 15; 4 February 2020; 18:00	1× (yellow card) 6× (suspension)	Report	1× (yellow card) 2× (suspension)	Municipal Sports Hall, Monor; Attendance: 910; Referees: Hantos, Rózsahegyi

Round 16; 15 February 2020; 18:00	Győri Audi ETO KC	49–23	Alba Fehérvár KC	Audi Aréna, Győr; Attendance: 3,411; Referees: Ignéczi, Kavalecz
Round 16; 15 February 2020; 18:00	Nze Minko 8	(25–11)	Töpfner 6	Audi Aréna, Győr; Attendance: 3,411; Referees: Ignéczi, Kavalecz
Round 16; 15 February 2020; 18:00	1× (yellow card) 1× (suspension)	Report	3× (yellow card) 3× (suspension)	Audi Aréna, Győr; Attendance: 3,411; Referees: Ignéczi, Kavalecz

Round 17; 19 February 2020; 18:00	Váci NKSE	28–35	Győri Audi ETO KC	Municipal Sports Hall, Vác; Attendance: 660; Referees: Fekete, Tóth
Round 17; 19 February 2020; 18:00	Hámori, Kuczora 6	(15–22)	Oftedal 9	Municipal Sports Hall, Vác; Attendance: 660; Referees: Fekete, Tóth
Round 17; 19 February 2020; 18:00	1× (yellow card) 4× (suspension)	Report	3× (suspension)	Municipal Sports Hall, Vác; Attendance: 660; Referees: Fekete, Tóth

Round 18; 4 March 2020; 18:00	Győri Audi ETO KC	45–28	EUbility Group-Békéscsaba	Audi Aréna, Győr; Attendance: 2,577; Referees: Kovács-Sebők, Réti
Round 18; 4 March 2020; 18:00	Oftedal 8	(22–14)	Barján 8	Audi Aréna, Győr; Attendance: 2,577; Referees: Kovács-Sebők, Réti
Round 18; 4 March 2020; 18:00	1× (yellow card)	Report	2× (yellow card) 2× (suspension)	Audi Aréna, Győr; Attendance: 2,577; Referees: Kovács-Sebők, Réti

Round 20; 5 January 2020; 15:45	Győri Audi ETO KC	30–19	Dunaújvárosi Kohász KA	Audi Aréna, Győr; Attendance: 3,812; Referees: Rontó, Szanyi
Round 20; 5 January 2020; 15:45	Puhalák 5	(14–10)	Szalai 5	Audi Aréna, Győr; Attendance: 3,812; Referees: Rontó, Szanyi
Round 20; 5 January 2020; 15:45	1× (yellow card) 1× (suspension)	Report	4× (suspension)	Audi Aréna, Győr; Attendance: 3,812; Referees: Rontó, Szanyi

Round 21; 2 January 2020; 18:00	MTK Budapest	25–31	Győri Audi ETO KC	Elektromos hall, Budapest; Attendance: 400; Referees: Kovács-Sebők, Réti
Round 21; 2 January 2020; 18:00	Zácsik 8	(14–15)	Amorim, Kurtović 8	Elektromos hall, Budapest; Attendance: 400; Referees: Kovács-Sebők, Réti
Round 21; 2 January 2020; 18:00	2× (yellow card) 4× (suspension)	Report	6× (suspension)	Elektromos hall, Budapest; Attendance: 400; Referees: Kovács-Sebők, Réti

Round 22; 18 April 2020; 18:00	Győri Audi ETO KC	CANCELLED	Motherson-Mosonmagyaróvár	Audi Aréna, Győr
Round 22; 18 April 2020; 18:00		(–)		Audi Aréna, Győr
Round 22; 18 April 2020; 18:00		Report		Audi Aréna, Győr

==== Results overview ====
Opposition	Home score	Away score	Double
Alba Fehérvár KC	49–23	22–28	77–45
EUbility Group-Békéscsaba	45–28	19–30	75–47
DVSC Schaeffler	36–28	CANCELLED	-
Dunaújvárosi Kohász KA	30–19	21–34	64–40
Érd	39–28	CANCELLED	-
FTC-Rail Cargo Hungaria	CANCELLED	27–28	-
Kisvárda Master Good SE	45–19	CANCELLED	-
MTK Budapest	38–21	25–31	69–46
Motherson-Mosonmagyaróvár	CANCELLED	21–35	-
Siófok KC	27–24	29–34	56–58
Szent István SE	33–22	23–47	80–45
Hungast-Szombathelyi KKA	CANCELLED	27–41	-
Váci NKSE	33–24	28–35	68–52

=== Hungarian Cup ===
==== Matches ====
5th round 15 April 2020; 18:15	Siófok KC	–	Győri Audi ETO KC	Szilárd Kiss Sports Hall, Siófok
5th round 15 April 2020; 18:15		(–)		Szilárd Kiss Sports Hall, Siófok
5th round 15 April 2020; 18:15		Report		Szilárd Kiss Sports Hall, Siófok

=== EHF Champions League ===
==== Group stage ====
Pos	Team	Pld	W	D	L	GF	GA	GD	Pts	Qualification	GYO	SAV	KRI	BAN
1	(Hungary) Győri Audi ETO KC	6	6	0	0	216	147	+69	12	Main round	—	35–23	31–26	35–29
2	(Sweden) IK Sävehof	6	2	1	3	148	166	−18	5	Main round	27–36	—	21–25	24–19
3	(Slovenia) Krim Mercator	6	2	0	4	158	170	−12	4	Main round	21–33	26–28	—	29–31
4	(Czech Republic) DHK Baník Most	6	1	1	4	151	190	−39	3	EHF Cup	21–46	25–25	26–31	—

Source: EHF
Rules for classification: Tiebreakers

===== Matches =====
6 October 2019; 17:00	Győri Audi ETO KC	35–23	(Sweden) IK Sävehof	Audi Aréna, Győr; Attendance: 5,127; Referees: Hatipoğlu, Şimşek (TUR)
6 October 2019; 17:00	three players 5	(17–11)	Forsberg, Mortensen 5	Audi Aréna, Győr; Attendance: 5,127; Referees: Hatipoğlu, Şimşek (TUR)
6 October 2019; 17:00	2× (yellow card) 1× (suspension)	Report	2× (yellow card) 4× (suspension)	Audi Aréna, Győr; Attendance: 5,127; Referees: Hatipoğlu, Şimşek (TUR)

13 October 2019; 19:00	DHK Baník Most (Czech Republic)	21–46	Győri Audi ETO KC	Rocknet aréna, Chomutov; Attendance: 2,784; Referees: Lidacka, Lesiak (POL)
13 October 2019; 19:00	Zachová 5	(13–23)	Oftedal 9	Rocknet aréna, Chomutov; Attendance: 2,784; Referees: Lidacka, Lesiak (POL)
13 October 2019; 19:00	1× (yellow card) 1× (suspension)	Report	1× (suspension)	Rocknet aréna, Chomutov; Attendance: 2,784; Referees: Lidacka, Lesiak (POL)

19 October 2019; 19:30	Krim Mercator (Slovenia)	21–33	Győri Audi ETO KC	Kodeljevo Hall, Ljubljana; Attendance: 1,500; Referees: Christidi, Papamattheou (GRE)
19 October 2019; 19:30	Varagić, Zulić 5	(9–13)	Amorim 7	Kodeljevo Hall, Ljubljana; Attendance: 1,500; Referees: Christidi, Papamattheou (GRE)
19 October 2019; 19:30	4× (yellow card) 3× (suspension)	Report	3× (yellow card) 2× (suspension)	Kodeljevo Hall, Ljubljana; Attendance: 1,500; Referees: Christidi, Papamattheou (GRE)

2 November 2019; 17:00	Győri Audi ETO KC	31–26	(Slovenia) Krim Mercator	Audi Aréna, Győr; Attendance: 5,250; Referees: Lončar, Lončar (CRO)
2 November 2019; 17:00	Oftedal 7	(13–13)	Varagić 5	Audi Aréna, Győr; Attendance: 5,250; Referees: Lončar, Lončar (CRO)
2 November 2019; 17:00	2× (yellow card) 1× (suspension)	Report	5× (suspension)	Audi Aréna, Győr; Attendance: 5,250; Referees: Lončar, Lončar (CRO)

9 November 2019; 13:30	IK Sävehof (Sweden)	27–36	Győri Audi ETO KC	Partille Arena, Partille; Attendance: 1,592; Referees: Năstase, Stancu (ROU)
9 November 2019; 13:30	Lundbäck 8	(12–19)	Oftedal 7	Partille Arena, Partille; Attendance: 1,592; Referees: Năstase, Stancu (ROU)
9 November 2019; 13:30	1× (yellow card) 2× (suspension)	Report	3× (yellow card) 2× (suspension)	Partille Arena, Partille; Attendance: 1,592; Referees: Năstase, Stancu (ROU)

17 November 2019; 17:00	Győri Audi ETO KC	35–29	(Czech Republic) DHK Baník Most	Audi Aréna, Győr; Attendance: 5,179; Referees: Praštalo, Balvan (BIH)
17 November 2019; 17:00	Nze Minko 8	(22–18)	Maňáková, Zachová 4	Audi Aréna, Győr; Attendance: 5,179; Referees: Praštalo, Balvan (BIH)
17 November 2019; 17:00	2× (yellow card) 1× (suspension)	Report	1× (yellow card) 1× (suspension)	Audi Aréna, Győr; Attendance: 5,179; Referees: Praštalo, Balvan (BIH)

===== Results overview =====
Opposition	Home score	Away score	Double
(Slovenia) Krim Mercator	31–26	21–33	64–45
(Sweden) IK Sävehof	35–23	27–36	71–50
(Czech Republic) DHK Baník Most	35–29	21–46	81–50

==== Main round ====
Pos	Team	Pld	W	D	L	GF	GA	GD	Pts	Qualification	GYO	BRE	BUD	VAL	KRI	SAV
1	(Hungary) Győri Audi ETO KC	10	9	1	0	309	252	+57	19	Quarterfinals	—	27–27	26–24	35–29	31–26	35–23
2	(France) Brest Bretagne Handball	10	8	1	1	311	253	+58	17	Quarterfinals	28–29	—	32–28	37–24	37–26	31–22
3	(Montenegro) Budućnost	10	5	0	5	271	266	+5	10	Quarterfinals	27–28	32–35	—	23–19	30–28	30–25
4	(Romania) SCM Râmnicu Vâlcea	10	3	1	6	245	252	−7	7	Quarterfinals	20–29	23–26	20–21	—	31–16	28–20
5	(Slovenia) Krim Mercator	10	2	1	7	250	291	−41	5		21–33	25–29	29–23	28–28	—	26–28
6	(Sweden) IK Sävehof	10	1	0	9	224	296	−72	2		27–36	17–29	24–33	17–23	21–25	—

Source: EHF
Rules for classification: Tiebreakers

===== Matches =====
26 January 2020; 19:00	Győri Audi ETO KC	27–27	(France) Brest Bretagne Handball	Audi Aréna, Győr; Attendance: 5,194; Referees: Sá, Sá (POR)
26 January 2020; 19:00	Fodor, Kristiansen 5	(15–17)	Gros 6	Audi Aréna, Győr; Attendance: 5,194; Referees: Sá, Sá (POR)
26 January 2020; 19:00	2× (yellow card) 1× (suspension)	Report	2× (yellow card) 3× (suspension)	Audi Aréna, Győr; Attendance: 5,194; Referees: Sá, Sá (POR)

1 February 2020; 17:00	Győri Audi ETO KC	26–24	(Montenegro) Budućnost	Audi Aréna, Győr; Attendance: 5,437; Referees: Mandák, Rudinský (SVK)
1 February 2020; 17:00	Kurtović 7	(15–12)	Radičević 10	Audi Aréna, Győr; Attendance: 5,437; Referees: Mandák, Rudinský (SVK)
1 February 2020; 17:00	3× (yellow card) 3× (suspension)	Report	2× (yellow card) 2× (suspension)	Audi Aréna, Győr; Attendance: 5,437; Referees: Mandák, Rudinský (SVK)

8 February 2020; 14:00 (15:00 EET)	SCM Râmnicu Vâlcea (Romania)	20–29	Győri Audi ETO KC	Traian Sports Hall, Râmnicu Vâlcea; Attendance: 2,239; Referees: Merz, Kuttler (GER)
8 February 2020; 14:00 (15:00 EET)	Elghaoui 7	(6–10)	Kristiansen 8	Traian Sports Hall, Râmnicu Vâlcea; Attendance: 2,239; Referees: Merz, Kuttler (GER)
8 February 2020; 14:00 (15:00 EET)	2× (yellow card) 7× (suspension)	Report	1× (yellow card) 2× (suspension)	Traian Sports Hall, Râmnicu Vâlcea; Attendance: 2,239; Referees: Merz, Kuttler (GER)

23 February 2020; 19:00	Brest Bretagne Handball (France)	28–29	Győri Audi ETO KC	Brest Arena, Brest; Attendance: 4,222; Referees: Florescu, Stoia (ROU)
23 February 2020; 19:00	Foppa, Gros 7	(15–14)	Kristiansen 9	Brest Arena, Brest; Attendance: 4,222; Referees: Florescu, Stoia (ROU)
23 February 2020; 19:00	2× (yellow card)	Report	3× (yellow card)	Brest Arena, Brest; Attendance: 4,222; Referees: Florescu, Stoia (ROU)

1 March 2020; 17:00	Budućnost (Montenegro)	27–28	Győri Audi ETO KC	Morača Sports Center, Podgorica; Attendance: 3,100; Referees: Ilieva, Karbeska (MKD)
1 March 2020; 17:00	Radičević 7	(17–12)	Bulatović 8	Morača Sports Center, Podgorica; Attendance: 3,100; Referees: Ilieva, Karbeska (MKD)
1 March 2020; 17:00	3× (yellow card) 2× (suspension)	Report	3× (yellow card) 1× (suspension)	Morača Sports Center, Podgorica; Attendance: 3,100; Referees: Ilieva, Karbeska (MKD)

7 March 2020; 16:00	Győri Audi ETO KC	35–29	(Romania) SCM Râmnicu Vâlcea	Audi Aréna, Győr; Attendance: 5,329; Referees: Simone, Monitillo (ITA)
7 March 2020; 16:00	Oftedal 6	(20–15)	three players 5	Audi Aréna, Győr; Attendance: 5,329; Referees: Simone, Monitillo (ITA)
7 March 2020; 16:00	1× (yellow card) 4× (suspension)	Report	3× (yellow card) 4× (suspension)	Audi Aréna, Győr; Attendance: 5,329; Referees: Simone, Monitillo (ITA)

===== Results overview =====
Opposition	Home score	Away score	Double
(France) Brest Bretagne Handball	27–27	28–29	55–54
(Montenegro) Budućnost	26–24	27–28	54–51
(Romania) SCM Râmnicu Vâlcea	35–29	20–29	64–49

==== Knockout stage ====
===== Quarter-finals =====
5 April 2020; 17:30 (18:30 EET)	CSM București (Romania)	CANCELLED	Győri Audi ETO KC	Sala Polivalentă, Bucharest
5 April 2020; 17:30 (18:30 EET)		Report		Sala Polivalentă, Bucharest

11 April 2020; 19:00	Győri Audi ETO KC	CANCELLED	(Romania) CSM București	Audi Aréna, Győr
11 April 2020; 19:00		Report		Audi Aréna, Győr

== Statistics ==
=== Top scorers ===
Includes all competitive matches. The list is sorted by shirt number when total goals are equal.

Last updated on 7 March 2020

Position	Nation	No.	Name	Hungarian League	Hungarian Cup	Champions League	Total
1	(Norway)	15	Stine Bredal Oftedal	115	0	58	173
2	(France)	27	Estelle Nze Minko	93	0	39	132
3	(Denmark)	8	Anne Mette Hansen	68	0	34	102
4	(Brazil)	18	Eduarda Amorim	48	0	50	98
5	(Norway)	7	Kari Brattset Dale	58	0	33	91
6	(Hungary)	23	Csenge Fodor	44	0	26	70
7	(Norway)	21	Veronica Kristiansen	38	0	27	65
8	(Montenegro)	32	Katarina Bulatović	33	0	29	62
9	(Czech Republic)	3	Jana Knedlíková	36	0	20	56
10	(Norway)	24	Amanda Kurtović	37	0	19	56
11	(Hungary)	48	Dorottya Faluvégi	33	0	16	49
12	(Hungary)	57	Szidónia Puhalák	36	0	10	46
13	(Hungary)	33	Bernadett Bódi	30	0	15	45
14	(France)	2	Béatrice Edwige	33	0	10	43
15	(Hungary)	13	Anita Görbicz	8	0	4	12
16	(France)	12	Amandine Leynaud	3	0	0	3
			TOTALS	713	0	390	1,103

=== Attendances ===
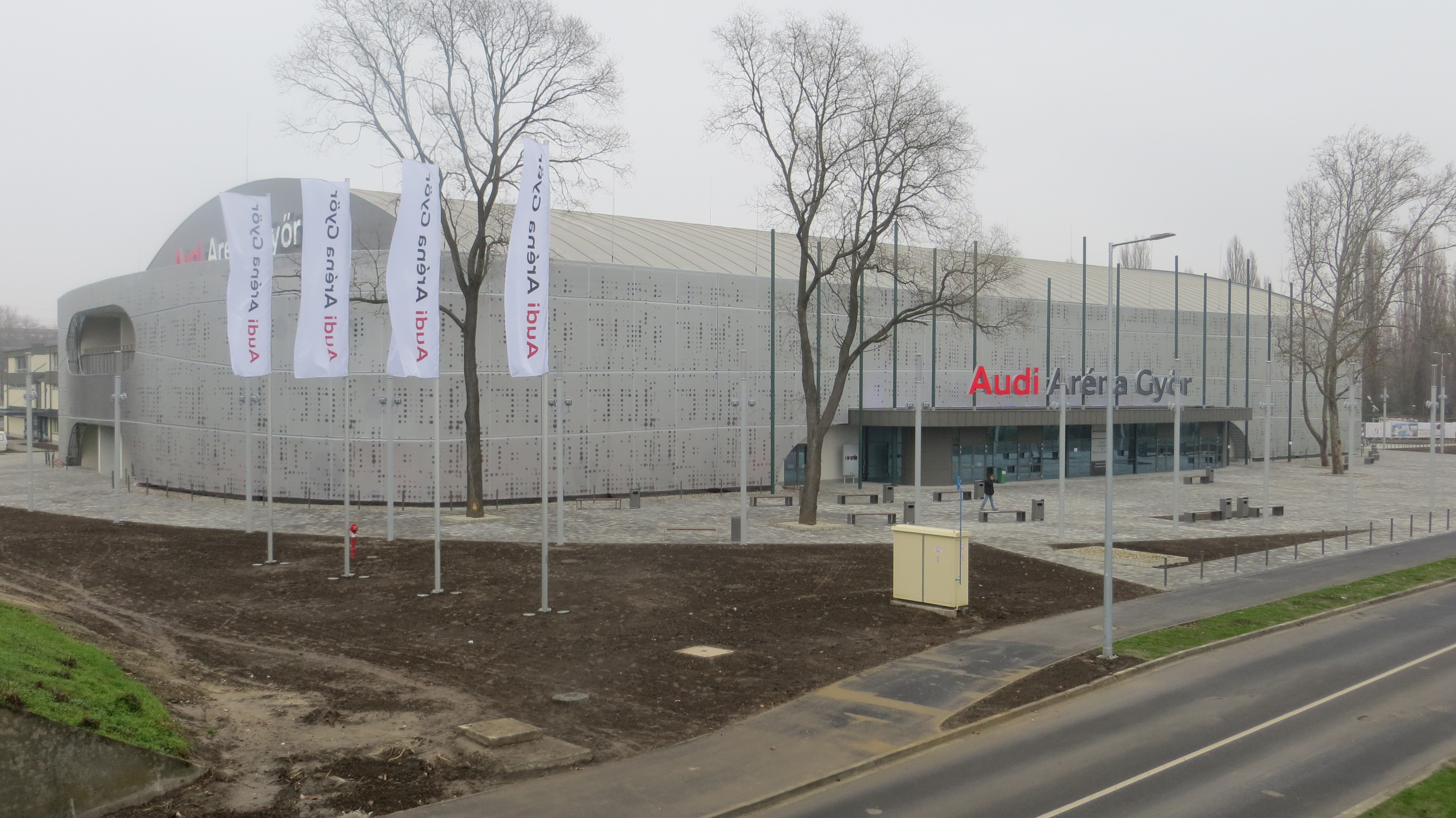
Home hall: Audi Aréna

List of the home matches:

Round	Against	Attadance	Capatility	Date
NB I- 1.	Siófok KC	4,874	88,6%	September 1, 2019
NB I- 2.	Szent István SE	2,543	46,3%	September 6, 2019
NB I- 4.	Váci NKSE	2,744	49,9%	September 18, 2019
NB I- 8.	MTK Budapest	2,279	41,4%	October 2, 2019
CL-(GS) 1.	IK Sävehof (Sweden)	5,127	93,2%	October 6, 2019
NB I- 6.	Érd	3,565	64,8%	October 16, 2019
CL-(GS) 4.	Krim Mercator (Slovenia)	5,250	95,5%	November 2, 2019
NB I- 10.	DVSC Schaeffler	3,479	63,3%	November 12, 2019
CL-(GS) 6.	DHK Baník Most (Czech Republic)	5,179	94,1%	November 17, 2019
NB I- 20.	Dunaújvárosi Kohász KA	3,812	69,3%	January 5, 2020
NB I- 13.	Kisvárda Master Good SE	3,561	64,7%	January 18, 2020
CL-(MR) 1.	Brest Bretagne Handball (France)	5,194	94,4%	January 26, 2020
CL-(MR) 2.	Budućnost (Montenegro)	5,437	98,9%	February 1, 2020
NB I- 16.	Alba Fehévár KC	3,411	62,0%	February 15, 2020
NB I- 18.	EUbility Group-Békéscsaba	2,577	46,9%	March 4, 2020
CL-(MR) 6.	SCM Râmnicu Vâlcea (Romania)	5,329	96,9%	March 7, 2020
