= 2019–20 Women's EHF Champions League group stage =

Handball tournaments

The 2019–20 Women's EHF Champions League group stage began on 4 October and concluded on 17 November 2019. A total of 16 teams were competing for 12 places in the main round of the 2019–20 Women's EHF Champions League.

== Draw ==
The draw for the group stage was held on 27 June 2019.

=== Seedings ===
The seedings were announced on 24 June 2019.

Pot 1	Pot 2	Pot 3	Pot 4
(France) Metz Handball (Hungary) Győri Audi ETO KC (Romania) SCM Râmnicu Vâlcea (Russia) Rostov-Don	(Denmark) Team Esbjerg (Montenegro) Budućnost (Norway) Vipers Kristiansand (Slovenia) Krim Merkator	(Croatia) Podravka Vegeta (Germany) SG BBM Bietigheim (Poland) MKS Perla Lublin (Sweden) IK Sävehof	(Hungary) FTC-Rail Cargo Hungaria (Romania) CSM București (France) Brest Bretagne Handball (Czech Republic) DHK Baník Most

== Format ==
In each group, teams played against each other in a double round-robin format, with home and away matches. After completion of the group stage matches, the top three teams advanced to the main round. Teams were not able to face opponents from the same country in the group.

== Tiebreakers ==
In the group stage, teams were ranked according to points (2 points for a win, 1 point for a draw, 0 points for a loss). After completion of the group stage, if two or more teams had score the same number of points, the ranking will be determined as follows:

1. Highest number of points in matches between the teams directly involved;
2. Superior goal difference in matches between the teams directly involved;
3. Highest number of goals scored in matches between the teams directly involved (or in the away match in case of a two-team tie);
4. Superior goal difference in all matches of the group;
5. Highest number of plus goals in all matches of the group;

If the ranking of one of these teams is determined, the above criteria are consecutively followed until the ranking of all teams is determined. If no ranking can be determined, a decision shall be obtained by EHF through drawing of lots.

== Groups ==
The matchdays were 4–6 October, 11–13 October, 18–20 October, 1–3 November, 8–10 November, 15–17 November 2019.

=== Group A ===
Pos	Team	Pld	W	D	L	GF	GA	GD	Pts	Qualification
1	(France) Metz Handball	6	4	2	0	194	158	+36	10	Main round
2	(Norway) Vipers Kristiansand	6	3	1	2	178	168	+10	7	Main round
3	(Hungary) FTC-Rail Cargo Hungaria	6	2	1	3	167	180	−13	5	Main round
4	(Croatia) Podravka Vegeta	6	1	0	5	161	194	−33	2	EHF Cup

Source: EHF
Rules for classification: Tiebreakers

5 October 2019; 19:15	Vipers Kristiansand (Norway)	31–22	(Hungary) FTC-Rail Cargo Hungaria	Aquarama Kristiansand, Kristiansand; Attendance: 1,640; Referees: Leandersson, Lindroos (FIN)
5 October 2019; 19:15	Løke 8	(16–11)	Háfra 10	Aquarama Kristiansand, Kristiansand; Attendance: 1,640; Referees: Leandersson, Lindroos (FIN)
5 October 2019; 19:15	2× (yellow card) 3× (suspension)	Report	2× (yellow card) 5× (suspension)	Aquarama Kristiansand, Kristiansand; Attendance: 1,640; Referees: Leandersson, Lindroos (FIN)

6 October 2019; 17:00	Metz Handball (France)	40–26	(Croatia) Podravka Vegeta	Palais omnisport Les Arènes, Metz; Attendance: 3,886; Referees: Freitas, Carvalho (POR)
6 October 2019; 17:00	Burgaard 8	(24–13)	Stanko, Tsàkalou 5	Palais omnisport Les Arènes, Metz; Attendance: 3,886; Referees: Freitas, Carvalho (POR)
6 October 2019; 17:00	2× (yellow card) 2× (suspension)	Report	3× (yellow card) 3× (suspension)	Palais omnisport Les Arènes, Metz; Attendance: 3,886; Referees: Freitas, Carvalho (POR)

13 October 2019; 13:00	FTC-Rail Cargo Hungaria (Hungary)	28–34	(France) Metz Handball	Érd Aréna, Érd; Attendance: 2,050; Referees: Opava, Válek (CZE)
13 October 2019; 13:00	Klujber 12	(16–20)	Zaadi 6	Érd Aréna, Érd; Attendance: 2,050; Referees: Opava, Válek (CZE)
13 October 2019; 13:00	2× (yellow card) 6× (suspension)	Report	3× (yellow card) 4× (suspension) 1× (red card)	Érd Aréna, Érd; Attendance: 2,050; Referees: Opava, Válek (CZE)

13 October 2019; 17:00	Podravka Vegeta (Croatia)	25–24	(Norway) Vipers Kristiansand	Gimnazija "Fran Galović", Koprivnica; Attendance: 2,500; Referees: Ilieva, Karbeska (MKD)
13 October 2019; 17:00	Milosavljević 10	(14–12)	Aune 6	Gimnazija "Fran Galović", Koprivnica; Attendance: 2,500; Referees: Ilieva, Karbeska (MKD)
13 October 2019; 17:00	3× (yellow card) 4× (suspension)	Report	3× (yellow card)	Gimnazija "Fran Galović", Koprivnica; Attendance: 2,500; Referees: Ilieva, Karbeska (MKD)

19 October 2019; 15:00	FTC-Rail Cargo Hungaria (Hungary)	37–31	(Croatia) Podravka Vegeta	Érd Aréna, Érd; Attendance: 1,800; Referees: Florescu, Stoia (ROU)
19 October 2019; 15:00	Klujber 11	(17–17)	Milosavljević 8	Érd Aréna, Érd; Attendance: 1,800; Referees: Florescu, Stoia (ROU)
19 October 2019; 15:00	2× (yellow card) 4× (suspension)	Report	3× (yellow card) 6× (suspension) 1× (red card)	Érd Aréna, Érd; Attendance: 1,800; Referees: Florescu, Stoia (ROU)

20 October 2019; 15:00	Vipers Kristiansand (Norway)	38–38	(France) Metz Handball	Aquarama Kristiansand, Kristiansand; Attendance: 1,717; Referees: Antić, Jakovljević (SRB)
20 October 2019; 15:00	Arntzen 8	(17–21)	Zaadi 13	Aquarama Kristiansand, Kristiansand; Attendance: 1,717; Referees: Antić, Jakovljević (SRB)
20 October 2019; 15:00	3× (yellow card) 1× (suspension)	Report	2× (yellow card) 4× (suspension)	Aquarama Kristiansand, Kristiansand; Attendance: 1,717; Referees: Antić, Jakovljević (SRB)

2 November 2019; 20:00	Podravka Vegeta (Croatia)	26–27	(Hungary) FTC-Rail Cargo Hungaria	Gimnazija "Fran Galović", Koprivnica; Attendance: 2,500; Referees: Mitrović, Kažanegra (MNE)
2 November 2019; 20:00	Milosavljević 9	(15–14)	three players 5	Gimnazija "Fran Galović", Koprivnica; Attendance: 2,500; Referees: Mitrović, Kažanegra (MNE)
2 November 2019; 20:00	3× (yellow card) 3× (suspension)	Report	1× (yellow card) 6× (suspension)	Gimnazija "Fran Galović", Koprivnica; Attendance: 2,500; Referees: Mitrović, Kažanegra (MNE)

3 November 2019; 20:45	Metz Handball (France)	26–17	(Norway) Vipers Kristiansand	Palais omnisport Les Arènes, Metz; Attendance: 4,066; Referees: Alpaidze, Berezkina (RUS)
3 November 2019; 20:45	Luciano 7	(12–10)	Dahl 4	Palais omnisport Les Arènes, Metz; Attendance: 4,066; Referees: Alpaidze, Berezkina (RUS)
3 November 2019; 20:45	1× (yellow card) 5× (suspension)	Report	2× (yellow card) 5× (suspension)	Palais omnisport Les Arènes, Metz; Attendance: 4,066; Referees: Alpaidze, Berezkina (RUS)

8 November 2019; 18:00	Podravka Vegeta (Croatia)	25–32	(France) Metz Handball	Gimnazija "Fran Galović", Koprivnica; Attendance: 2,150; Referees: Panayides, Andreou (CYP)
8 November 2019; 18:00	Tsàkalou 8	(15–15)	Sajka 6	Gimnazija "Fran Galović", Koprivnica; Attendance: 2,150; Referees: Panayides, Andreou (CYP)
8 November 2019; 18:00	3× (yellow card) 1× (suspension)	Report	3× (yellow card) 4× (suspension)	Gimnazija "Fran Galović", Koprivnica; Attendance: 2,150; Referees: Panayides, Andreou (CYP)

9 November 2019; 19:30	FTC-Rail Cargo Hungaria (Hungary)	29–34	(Norway) Vipers Kristiansand	Érd Aréna, Érd; Attendance: 2,200; Referees: Merz, Kuttler (GER)
9 November 2019; 19:30	Klujber 6	(15–19)	Arntzen 11	Érd Aréna, Érd; Attendance: 2,200; Referees: Merz, Kuttler (GER)
9 November 2019; 19:30	2× (yellow card) 6× (suspension)	Report	2× (yellow card) 6× (suspension)	Érd Aréna, Érd; Attendance: 2,200; Referees: Merz, Kuttler (GER)

16 November 2019; 19:15	Vipers Kristiansand (Norway)	34–28	(Croatia) Podravka Vegeta	Aquarama Kristiansand, Kristiansand; Attendance: 1,660; Referees: Kijauskaitė, Žalienė (LTU)
16 November 2019; 19:15	Dahl 11	(20–13)	Tsàkalou 7	Aquarama Kristiansand, Kristiansand; Attendance: 1,660; Referees: Kijauskaitė, Žalienė (LTU)
16 November 2019; 19:15	1× (yellow card) 3× (suspension)	Report	3× (yellow card) 5× (suspension)	Aquarama Kristiansand, Kristiansand; Attendance: 1,660; Referees: Kijauskaitė, Žalienė (LTU)

16 November 2019; 19:30	Metz Handball (France)	24–24	(Hungary) FTC-Rail Cargo Hungaria	Palais omnisport Les Arènes, Metz; Attendance: 4,200; Referees: Ilieva, Karbeska (MKD)
16 November 2019; 19:30	Zaadi 6	(10–14)	Schatzl 7	Palais omnisport Les Arènes, Metz; Attendance: 4,200; Referees: Ilieva, Karbeska (MKD)
16 November 2019; 19:30	3× (yellow card) 2× (suspension)	Report	4× (yellow card) 4× (suspension)	Palais omnisport Les Arènes, Metz; Attendance: 4,200; Referees: Ilieva, Karbeska (MKD)

=== Group B ===
Pos	Team	Pld	W	D	L	GF	GA	GD	Pts	Qualification
1	(Russia) Rostov-Don	6	4	1	1	167	143	+24	9	Main round
2	(Denmark) Team Esbjerg	6	4	0	2	167	149	+18	8	Main round
3	(Romania) CSM București	6	3	1	2	153	131	+22	7	Main round
4	(Poland) MKS Perła Lublin	6	0	0	6	123	187	−64	0	EHF Cup

Source: EHF
Rules for classification: Tiebreakers

5 October 2019; 15:00	Rostov-Don (Russia)	31–21	(Poland) MKS Perla Lublin	Rostov-on-Don Palace of Sports, Rostov-on-Don; Attendance: 3,428; Referees: Mitrović, Kažanegra (MNE)
5 October 2019; 15:00	Managarova 6	(21–11)	Kochaniak, Łabuda 4	Rostov-on-Don Palace of Sports, Rostov-on-Don; Attendance: 3,428; Referees: Mitrović, Kažanegra (MNE)
5 October 2019; 15:00	1× (yellow card) 3× (suspension)	Report	2× (suspension)	Rostov-on-Don Palace of Sports, Rostov-on-Don; Attendance: 3,428; Referees: Mitrović, Kažanegra (MNE)

6 October 2019; 16:50	Team Esbjerg (Denmark)	22–24	(Romania) CSM București	Blue Water Dokken, Esbjerg; Attendance: 1,910; Referees: Mandák, Rudinský (SVK)
6 October 2019; 16:50	Polman 6	(8–13)	Lekić 5	Blue Water Dokken, Esbjerg; Attendance: 1,910; Referees: Mandák, Rudinský (SVK)
6 October 2019; 16:50	2× (yellow card) 3× (suspension)	Report	3× (yellow card) 6× (suspension)	Blue Water Dokken, Esbjerg; Attendance: 1,910; Referees: Mandák, Rudinský (SVK)

11 October 2019; 18:30	CSM București (Romania)	23–23	(Russia) Rostov-Don	Sala Polivalentă, Bucharest; Attendance: 4,572; Referees: Jurinović, Mrvica (CRO)
11 October 2019; 18:30	Lekić 8	(13–14)	Vyakhireva 12	Sala Polivalentă, Bucharest; Attendance: 4,572; Referees: Jurinović, Mrvica (CRO)
11 October 2019; 18:30	3× (yellow card) 3× (suspension)	Report	2× (yellow card) 3× (suspension)	Sala Polivalentă, Bucharest; Attendance: 4,572; Referees: Jurinović, Mrvica (CRO)

12 October 2019; 18:00	MKS Perla Lublin (Poland)	22–28	(Denmark) Team Esbjerg	Globus Hall, Lublin; Attendance: 2,614; Referees: Lončar, Lončar (CRO)
12 October 2019; 18:00	Achruk 5	(15–12)	Frey 8	Globus Hall, Lublin; Attendance: 2,614; Referees: Lončar, Lončar (CRO)
12 October 2019; 18:00	1× (yellow card) 2× (suspension)	Report	2× (yellow card) 4× (suspension)	Globus Hall, Lublin; Attendance: 2,614; Referees: Lončar, Lončar (CRO)

19 October 2019; 14:30	Team Esbjerg (Denmark)	31–26	(Russia) Rostov-Don	Blue Water Dokken, Esbjerg; Attendance: 2,132; Referees: Bonaventura, Bonaventura (FRA)
19 October 2019; 14:30	Polman 8	(16–11)	Makeyeva, Managarova 5	Blue Water Dokken, Esbjerg; Attendance: 2,132; Referees: Bonaventura, Bonaventura (FRA)
19 October 2019; 14:30	1× (yellow card) 2× (suspension)	Report	3× (yellow card) 5× (suspension)	Blue Water Dokken, Esbjerg; Attendance: 2,132; Referees: Bonaventura, Bonaventura (FRA)

19 October 2019; 17:00	CSM București (Romania)	35–19	(Poland) MKS Perla Lublin	Sala Polivalentă, Bucharest; Attendance: 4,500; Referees: Praštalo, Balvan (BIH)
19 October 2019; 17:00	Pintea 6	(16–10)	Blažević 4	Sala Polivalentă, Bucharest; Attendance: 4,500; Referees: Praštalo, Balvan (BIH)
19 October 2019; 17:00	2× (yellow card) 2× (suspension)	Report	2× (yellow card)	Sala Polivalentă, Bucharest; Attendance: 4,500; Referees: Praštalo, Balvan (BIH)

2 November 2019; 14:00	Rostov-Don (Russia)	34–26	(Denmark) Team Esbjerg	Rostov-on-Don Palace of Sports, Rostov-on-Don; Attendance: 3,337; Referees: Horváth, Marton (HUN)
2 November 2019; 14:00	Managarova 6	(16–13)	Frey, Solberg-Isaksen 7	Rostov-on-Don Palace of Sports, Rostov-on-Don; Attendance: 3,337; Referees: Horváth, Marton (HUN)
2 November 2019; 14:00	2× (yellow card) 7× (suspension)	Report	2× (yellow card) 3× (suspension)	Rostov-on-Don Palace of Sports, Rostov-on-Don; Attendance: 3,337; Referees: Horváth, Marton (HUN)

3 November 2019; 18:00	MKS Perla Lublin (Poland)	19–28	(Romania) CSM București	Globus Hall, Lublin; Attendance: 2,300; Referees: Kijauskaitė, Žalienė (LTU)
3 November 2019; 18:00	Gęga 6	(10–17)	Pintea 7	Globus Hall, Lublin; Attendance: 2,300; Referees: Kijauskaitė, Žalienė (LTU)
3 November 2019; 18:00	1× (yellow card) 1× (suspension)	Report	3× (yellow card) 3× (suspension)	Globus Hall, Lublin; Attendance: 2,300; Referees: Kijauskaitė, Žalienė (LTU)

9 November 2019; 18:30	MKS Perla Lublin (Poland)	20–30	(Russia) Rostov-Don	Globus Hall, Lublin; Attendance: 1,750; Referees: Christidi, Papamattheou (GRE)
9 November 2019; 18:30	Blažević, Matuszczyk 4	(12–20)	Sudakova 6	Globus Hall, Lublin; Attendance: 1,750; Referees: Christidi, Papamattheou (GRE)
9 November 2019; 18:30	3× (yellow card) 2× (suspension)	Report	2× (yellow card) 4× (suspension)	Globus Hall, Lublin; Attendance: 1,750; Referees: Christidi, Papamattheou (GRE)

10 November 2019; 13:30	CSM București (Romania)	21–25	(Denmark) Team Esbjerg	Sala Polivalentă, Bucharest; Attendance: 4,800; Referees: Bennani, Bennani (SWE)
10 November 2019; 13:30	Omoregie 5	(12–13)	Breistøl 7	Sala Polivalentă, Bucharest; Attendance: 4,800; Referees: Bennani, Bennani (SWE)
10 November 2019; 13:30	3× (yellow card) 2× (suspension)	Report	2× (yellow card) 4× (suspension)	Sala Polivalentă, Bucharest; Attendance: 4,800; Referees: Bennani, Bennani (SWE)

16 November 2019; 13:00	Rostov-Don (Russia)	23–22	(Romania) CSM București	Rostov-on-Don Palace of Sports, Rostov-on-Don; Attendance: 3,500; Referees: Lah, Sok (SLO)
16 November 2019; 13:00	Vyakhireva 5	(14–7)	Neagu 8	Rostov-on-Don Palace of Sports, Rostov-on-Don; Attendance: 3,500; Referees: Lah, Sok (SLO)
16 November 2019; 13:00	2× (yellow card) 5× (suspension)	Report	3× (suspension) 1× (red card)	Rostov-on-Don Palace of Sports, Rostov-on-Don; Attendance: 3,500; Referees: Lah, Sok (SLO)

17 November 2019; 15:10	Team Esbjerg (Denmark)	35–22	(Poland) MKS Perla Lublin	Blue Water Dokken, Esbjerg; Attendance: 1,760; Referees: Freitas, Carvalho (POR)
17 November 2019; 15:10	Breistøl, Danielsson 6	(20–9)	Achruk 4	Blue Water Dokken, Esbjerg; Attendance: 1,760; Referees: Freitas, Carvalho (POR)
17 November 2019; 15:10	3× (yellow card) 3× (suspension)	Report	1× (yellow card) 1× (suspension)	Blue Water Dokken, Esbjerg; Attendance: 1,760; Referees: Freitas, Carvalho (POR)

=== Group C ===
Pos	Team	Pld	W	D	L	GF	GA	GD	Pts	Qualification
1	(France) Brest Bretagne Handball	6	6	0	0	201	169	+32	12	Main round
2	(Montenegro) Budućnost	6	4	0	2	168	157	+11	8	Main round
3	(Romania) SCM Râmnicu Vâlcea	6	1	0	5	148	165	−17	2 (Note: SCM Râmnicu Vâlcea 65–58 SG BBM Bietigheim)	Main round
4	(Germany) SG BBM Bietigheim	6	1	0	5	171	197	−26	2	EHF Cup

Source: EHF
Rules for classification: Tiebreakers
Notes:

4 October 2019; 17:30	SCM Râmnicu Vâlcea (Romania)	34–27	(Germany) SG BBM Bietigheim	Traian Sports Hall, Râmnicu Vâlcea; Attendance: 2,200; Referees: Antić, Jakovljević (SRB)
4 October 2019; 17:30	Nørgaard 7	(20–18)	Van der Heijden 8	Traian Sports Hall, Râmnicu Vâlcea; Attendance: 2,200; Referees: Antić, Jakovljević (SRB)
4 October 2019; 17:30	1× (yellow card) 3× (suspension)	Report	2× (yellow card) 2× (suspension)	Traian Sports Hall, Râmnicu Vâlcea; Attendance: 2,200; Referees: Antić, Jakovljević (SRB)

5 October 2019; 19:00	Budućnost (Montenegro)	32–35	(France) Brest Bretagne Handball	Morača Sports Center, Podgorica; Attendance: 2,300; Referees: Lah, Sok (SVN)
5 October 2019; 19:00	Jauković 8	(17–16)	Coatanea, Gros 7	Morača Sports Center, Podgorica; Attendance: 2,300; Referees: Lah, Sok (SVN)
5 October 2019; 19:00	1× (yellow card) 3× (suspension)	Report	2× (yellow card) 4× (suspension)	Morača Sports Center, Podgorica; Attendance: 2,300; Referees: Lah, Sok (SVN)

12 October 2019; 19:00	Brest Bretagne Handball (France)	37–24	(Romania) SCM Râmnicu Vâlcea	Brest Arena, Brest; Attendance: 3,473; Referees: Alpaidze, Berezkina (RUS)
12 October 2019; 19:00	Niakaté, Pop-Lazić 6	(22–9)	Nørgaard 9	Brest Arena, Brest; Attendance: 3,473; Referees: Alpaidze, Berezkina (RUS)
12 October 2019; 19:00	4× (suspension)	Report	1× (yellow card) 3× (suspension)	Brest Arena, Brest; Attendance: 3,473; Referees: Alpaidze, Berezkina (RUS)

13 October 2019; 17:00	SG BBM Bietigheim (Germany)	23–30	(Montenegro) Budućnost	Arena Ludwigsburg, Ludwigsburg; Attendance: 1,137; Referees: Marín, García (ESP)
13 October 2019; 17:00	three players 5	(12–14)	Jauković, Mehmedović 7	Arena Ludwigsburg, Ludwigsburg; Attendance: 1,137; Referees: Marín, García (ESP)
13 October 2019; 17:00	2× (yellow card) 2× (suspension)	Report	1× (yellow card) 5× (suspension)	Arena Ludwigsburg, Ludwigsburg; Attendance: 1,137; Referees: Marín, García (ESP)

19 October 2019; 15:15	SG BBM Bietigheim (Germany)	32–35	(France) Brest Bretagne Handball	Arena Ludwigsburg, Ludwigsburg; Attendance: 2,030; Referees: Panayides, Andreou (CYP)
19 October 2019; 15:15	Naidzinavicius, Van der Heijden 6	(18–17)	Pop-Lazić 7	Arena Ludwigsburg, Ludwigsburg; Attendance: 2,030; Referees: Panayides, Andreou (CYP)
19 October 2019; 15:15	3× (yellow card) 2× (suspension)	Report	2× (yellow card) 1× (suspension)	Arena Ludwigsburg, Ludwigsburg; Attendance: 2,030; Referees: Panayides, Andreou (CYP)

19 October 2019; 19:00	Budućnost (Montenegro)	23–19	(Romania) SCM Râmnicu Vâlcea	Morača Sports Center, Podgorica; Attendance: 2,450; Referees: Christiansen, Hansen (DEN)
19 October 2019; 19:00	Radičević 13	(13–10)	Nørgaard 4	Morača Sports Center, Podgorica; Attendance: 2,450; Referees: Christiansen, Hansen (DEN)
19 October 2019; 19:00	1× (yellow card) 5× (suspension)	Report	2× (yellow card) 1× (suspension) 1× (red card)	Morača Sports Center, Podgorica; Attendance: 2,450; Referees: Christiansen, Hansen (DEN)

1 November 2019; 17:30	SCM Râmnicu Vâlcea (Romania)	20–21	(Montenegro) Budućnost	Traian Sports Hall, Râmnicu Vâlcea; Attendance: 2,239; Referees: Sa, Sa (POR)
1 November 2019; 17:30	Glibko, Vieira 6	(10–13)	Radičević 8	Traian Sports Hall, Râmnicu Vâlcea; Attendance: 2,239; Referees: Sa, Sa (POR)
1 November 2019; 17:30	3× (yellow card) 4× (suspension)	Report	3× (yellow card) 3× (suspension)	Traian Sports Hall, Râmnicu Vâlcea; Attendance: 2,239; Referees: Sa, Sa (POR)

2 November 2019; 15:00	Brest Bretagne Handball (France)	36–30	(Germany) SG BBM Bietigheim	Brest Arena, Brest; Attendance: 3,754; Referees: Covalciuc, Covalciuc (MDA)
2 November 2019; 15:00	Gros 13	(18–15)	Naidzinavicius 7	Brest Arena, Brest; Attendance: 3,754; Referees: Covalciuc, Covalciuc (MDA)
2 November 2019; 15:00	2× (yellow card) 3× (suspension)	Report	1× (yellow card) 3× (suspension)	Brest Arena, Brest; Attendance: 3,754; Referees: Covalciuc, Covalciuc (MDA)

10 November 2019; 15:00	Brest Bretagne Handball (France)	32–28	(Montenegro) Budućnost	Brest Arena, Brest; Attendance: 4,159; Referees: Erdoğan, Özdeniz (TUR)
10 November 2019; 15:00	Gros, Minevskaja 6	(14–15)	Radičević 10	Brest Arena, Brest; Attendance: 4,159; Referees: Erdoğan, Özdeniz (TUR)
10 November 2019; 15:00	2× (yellow card) 2× (suspension)	Report	2× (yellow card) 6× (suspension) 1× (red card)	Brest Arena, Brest; Attendance: 4,159; Referees: Erdoğan, Özdeniz (TUR)

10 November 2019; 18:00	SG BBM Bietigheim (Germany)	31–28	(Romania) SCM Râmnicu Vâlcea	Arena Ludwigsburg, Ludwigsburg; Attendance: 2,053; Referees: Leszczyński, Piechota (POL)
10 November 2019; 18:00	Malestein 7	(13–14)	Nørgaard 7	Arena Ludwigsburg, Ludwigsburg; Attendance: 2,053; Referees: Leszczyński, Piechota (POL)
10 November 2019; 18:00	2× (yellow card) 3× (suspension)	Report	2× (yellow card) 4× (suspension)	Arena Ludwigsburg, Ludwigsburg; Attendance: 2,053; Referees: Leszczyński, Piechota (POL)

16 November 2019; 17:00	SCM Râmnicu Vâlcea (Romania)	23–26	(France) Brest Bretagne Handball	Traian Sports Hall, Râmnicu Vâlcea; Attendance: 2,000; Referees: Marín, García (ESP)
16 November 2019; 17:00	Glibko, González 5	(13–14)	Coatanea, Pop-Lazić 5	Traian Sports Hall, Râmnicu Vâlcea; Attendance: 2,000; Referees: Marín, García (ESP)
16 November 2019; 17:00	2× (yellow card) 5× (suspension)	Report	1× (yellow card) 4× (suspension)	Traian Sports Hall, Râmnicu Vâlcea; Attendance: 2,000; Referees: Marín, García (ESP)

16 November 2019; 19:00	Budućnost (Montenegro)	34–28	(Germany) SG BBM Bietigheim	Morača Sports Center, Podgorica; Attendance: 2,130; Referees: Opava, Válek (CZE)
16 November 2019; 19:00	Radičević 8	(18–14)	Naidzinavicius 6	Morača Sports Center, Podgorica; Attendance: 2,130; Referees: Opava, Válek (CZE)
16 November 2019; 19:00	3× (yellow card) 2× (suspension)	Report	3× (yellow card) 2× (suspension)	Morača Sports Center, Podgorica; Attendance: 2,130; Referees: Opava, Válek (CZE)

=== Group D ===
Pos	Team	Pld	W	D	L	GF	GA	GD	Pts	Qualification
1	(Hungary) Győri Audi ETO KC	6	6	0	0	216	147	+69	12	Main round
2	(Sweden) IK Sävehof	6	2	1	3	148	166	−18	5	Main round
3	(Slovenia) Krim Mercator	6	2	0	4	158	170	−12	4	Main round
4	(Czech Republic) DHK Baník Most	6	1	1	4	151	190	−39	3	EHF Cup

Source: EHF
Rules for classification: Tiebreakers

6 October 2019; 17:00	Győri Audi ETO KC (Hungary)	35–23	(Sweden) IK Sävehof	Audi Aréna, Győr; Referees: Hatipoğlu, Şimşek (TUR)
6 October 2019; 17:00	three players 5	(17–11)	Forsberg, Mortensen 5	Audi Aréna, Győr; Referees: Hatipoğlu, Şimşek (TUR)
6 October 2019; 17:00	2× (yellow card) 1× (suspension)	Report	2× (yellow card) 4× (suspension)	Audi Aréna, Győr; Referees: Hatipoğlu, Şimşek (TUR)

6 October 2019; 17:00	Krim Mercator (Slovenia)	29–31	(Czech Republic) DHK Baník Most	Kodeljevo Hall, Ljubljana; Attendance: 900; Referees: Năstase, Stancu (ROU)
6 October 2019; 17:00	Varagić 12	(14–13)	Zachová 6	Kodeljevo Hall, Ljubljana; Attendance: 900; Referees: Năstase, Stancu (ROU)
6 October 2019; 17:00	2× (yellow card) 5× (suspension)	Report	2× (yellow card) 3× (suspension)	Kodeljevo Hall, Ljubljana; Attendance: 900; Referees: Năstase, Stancu (ROU)

13 October 2019; 15:00	IK Sävehof (Sweden)	21–25	(Slovenia) Krim Mercator	Partille Arena, Partille; Attendance: 615; Referees: Pandžić, Mošorinski (SRB)
13 October 2019; 15:00	three players 4	(10–13)	Zulić 5	Partille Arena, Partille; Attendance: 615; Referees: Pandžić, Mošorinski (SRB)
13 October 2019; 15:00	3× (yellow card) 4× (suspension)	Report	2× (yellow card) 3× (suspension)	Partille Arena, Partille; Attendance: 615; Referees: Pandžić, Mošorinski (SRB)

13 October 2019; 19:00	DHK Baník Most (Czech Republic)	21–46	(Hungary) Győri Audi ETO KC	Rocknet aréna, Chomutov; Attendance: 2,784; Referees: Lidacka, Lesiak (POL)
13 October 2019; 19:00	Zachová 5	(13–23)	Oftedal 9	Rocknet aréna, Chomutov; Attendance: 2,784; Referees: Lidacka, Lesiak (POL)
13 October 2019; 19:00	1× (yellow card) 1× (suspension)	Report	1× (suspension)	Rocknet aréna, Chomutov; Attendance: 2,784; Referees: Lidacka, Lesiak (POL)

19 October 2019; 19:30	Krim Mercator (Slovenia)	21–33	(Hungary) Győri Audi ETO KC	Kodeljevo Hall, Ljubljana; Attendance: 1,500; Referees: Christidi, Papamattheou (GRE)
19 October 2019; 19:30	Varagić, Zulić 5	(9–13)	Amorim 7	Kodeljevo Hall, Ljubljana; Attendance: 1,500; Referees: Christidi, Papamattheou (GRE)
19 October 2019; 19:30	4× (yellow card) 3× (suspension)	Report	3× (yellow card) 2× (suspension)	Kodeljevo Hall, Ljubljana; Attendance: 1,500; Referees: Christidi, Papamattheou (GRE)

20 October 2019; 19:00	DHK Baník Most (Czech Republic)	25–25	(Sweden) IK Sävehof	Rocknet aréna, Chomutov; Attendance: 1,402; Referees: Merz, Kuttler (GER)
20 October 2019; 19:00	Šustková 7	(17–13)	Forsberg 7	Rocknet aréna, Chomutov; Attendance: 1,402; Referees: Merz, Kuttler (GER)
20 October 2019; 19:00	1× (yellow card) 3× (suspension)	Report	2× (yellow card) 4× (suspension)	Rocknet aréna, Chomutov; Attendance: 1,402; Referees: Merz, Kuttler (GER)

2 November 2019; 13:30	IK Sävehof (Sweden)	24–19	(Czech Republic) DHK Baník Most	Partille Arena, Partille; Attendance: 823; Referees: Ershov, Pavliukov (RUS)
2 November 2019; 13:30	Forsberg 6	(12–8)	Zachová 6	Partille Arena, Partille; Attendance: 823; Referees: Ershov, Pavliukov (RUS)
2 November 2019; 13:30	2× (yellow card) 2× (suspension)	Report	2× (yellow card) 5× (suspension)	Partille Arena, Partille; Attendance: 823; Referees: Ershov, Pavliukov (RUS)

2 November 2019; 17:00	Győri Audi ETO KC (Hungary)	31–26	(Slovenia) Krim Mercator	Audi Aréna, Győr; Attendance: 5,250; Referees: Lončar, Lončar (CRO)
2 November 2019; 17:00	Oftedal 7	(13–13)	Varagić 5	Audi Aréna, Győr; Attendance: 5,250; Referees: Lončar, Lončar (CRO)
2 November 2019; 17:00	2× (yellow card) 1× (suspension)	Report	5× (suspension)	Audi Aréna, Győr; Attendance: 5,250; Referees: Lončar, Lončar (CRO)

9 November 2019; 13:30	IK Sävehof (Sweden)	27–36	(Hungary) Győri Audi ETO KC	Partille Arena, Partille; Attendance: 1,592; Referees: Năstase, Stancu (ROU)
9 November 2019; 13:30	Lundbäck 8	(12–19)	Oftedal 7	Partille Arena, Partille; Attendance: 1,592; Referees: Năstase, Stancu (ROU)
9 November 2019; 13:30	1× (yellow card) 2× (suspension)	Report	3× (yellow card) 2× (suspension)	Partille Arena, Partille; Attendance: 1,592; Referees: Năstase, Stancu (ROU)

10 November 2019; 19:00	DHK Baník Most (Czech Republic)	26–31	(Slovenia) Krim Mercator	Rocknet aréna, Chomutov; Attendance: 1,500; Referees: Christiansen, Hansen (DEN)
10 November 2019; 19:00	Zachová 8	(12–14)	Zulič 10	Rocknet aréna, Chomutov; Attendance: 1,500; Referees: Christiansen, Hansen (DEN)
10 November 2019; 19:00	2× (yellow card) 6× (suspension)	Report	1× (yellow card) 3× (suspension) 1× (red card)	Rocknet aréna, Chomutov; Attendance: 1,500; Referees: Christiansen, Hansen (DEN)

17 November 2019; 17:00	Győri Audi ETO KC (Hungary)	35–29	(Czech Republic) DHK Baník Most	Audi Aréna, Győr; Attendance: 5,179; Referees: Praštalo, Balvan (BIH)
17 November 2019; 17:00	Nze Minko 8	(22–18)	Maňáková, Zachová 4	Audi Aréna, Győr; Attendance: 5,179; Referees: Praštalo, Balvan (BIH)
17 November 2019; 17:00	2× (yellow card) 1× (suspension)	Report	1× (yellow card) 1× (suspension)	Audi Aréna, Győr; Attendance: 5,179; Referees: Praštalo, Balvan (BIH)

17 November 2019; 17:00	Krim Mercator (Slovenia)	26–28	(Sweden) IK Sävehof	Kodeljevo Hall, Ljubljana; Attendance: 1,152; Referees: Bounouara, Sami (FRA)
17 November 2019; 17:00	Barič 9	(12–14)	Dano, Lundbäck 5	Kodeljevo Hall, Ljubljana; Attendance: 1,152; Referees: Bounouara, Sami (FRA)
17 November 2019; 17:00	2× (yellow card) 2× (suspension)	Report	2× (yellow card) 6× (suspension)	Kodeljevo Hall, Ljubljana; Attendance: 1,152; Referees: Bounouara, Sami (FRA)
