= 2019–20 Women's EHF Champions League main round =

Handball tournaments

The 2019–20 Women's EHF Champions League main round began on 24 January and concluded on 8 March 2020. A total of twelve teams competed for eight places in the knockout stage of the 2019–20 Women's EHF Champions League

== Qualified teams ==
Group	Winners	Runners-up	Third place
A	(France) Metz Handball	(Norway) Vipers Kristiansand	(Hungary) FTC-Rail Cargo Hungaria
B	(Russia) Rostov-Don	(Denmark) Team Esbjerg	(Romania) CSM București
C	(France) Brest Bretagne Handball	(Montenegro) Budućnost	(Romania) SCM Râmnicu Vâlcea
D	(Hungary) Győri Audi ETO KC	(Sweden) IK Sävehof	(Slovenia) Krim Mercator

== Format ==
In each group, teams played against each other in a double round-robin format, with home and away matches. After completion of the group stage matches, the top four teams advanced to the knockout stage. Points against teams from the same group were carried over.

== Tiebreakers ==
In the group stage, teams were ranked according to points (2 points for a win, 1 point for a draw, 0 points for a loss). After completion of the group stage, if two or more teams have scored the same number of points, the ranking was determined as follows:

1. Highest number of points in matches between the teams directly involved;
2. Superior goal difference in matches between the teams directly involved;
3. Highest number of goals scored in matches between the teams directly involved (or in the away match in case of a two-team tie);
4. Superior goal difference in all matches of the group;
5. Highest number of plus goals in all matches of the group;

If the ranking of one of these teams is determined, the above criteria are consecutively followed until the ranking of all teams is determined. If no ranking can be determined, a decision shall be obtained by EHF through drawing of lots.

== Groups ==
The matchdays were 24–26 January, 31 January–2 February, 7–9 February, 21–23 February, 28 February–1 March, 6–8 March 2020.

=== Group 1 ===
Pos	Team	Pld	W	D	L	GF	GA	GD	Pts	Qualification
1	(France) Metz Handball	10	5	3	2	289	270	+19	13 (Note: Metz Handball 5 Pts, +7 GD; Team Esbjerg 5 Pts, −2 GD; Rostov-Don 2 Pts, −5 GD)	Quarterfinals
2	(Denmark) Team Esbjerg	10	6	1	3	289	279	+10	13	Quarterfinals
3	(Russia) Rostov-Don	10	6	1	3	279	266	+13	13	Quarterfinals
4	(Romania) CSM București	10	5	1	4	251	250	+1	11	Quarterfinals
5	(Norway) Vipers Kristiansand	10	2	1	7	281	303	−22	5 (Note: Vipers Kristiansand 65–51 FTC-Rail Cargo Hungaria)	
6	(Hungary) FTC-Rail Cargo Hungaria	10	2	1	7	270	291	−21	5	

Source: EHF
Rules for classification: Tiebreakers
Notes:

25 January 2020; 14:15	Vipers Kristiansand (Norway)	31–35	(Denmark) Team Esbjerg	Aquarama Kristiansand, Kristiansand; Attendance: 1,812; Referees: Andorka, Hucker (HUN)
25 January 2020; 14:15	Tomac 8	(15–16)	Breistøl 8	Aquarama Kristiansand, Kristiansand; Attendance: 1,812; Referees: Andorka, Hucker (HUN)
25 January 2020; 14:15	2× (yellow card)	Report	2× (yellow card) 2× (suspension)	Aquarama Kristiansand, Kristiansand; Attendance: 1,812; Referees: Andorka, Hucker (HUN)

25 January 2020; 15:00	Metz Handball (France)	23–20	(Russia) Rostov-Don	Palais omnisport Les Arènes, Metz; Attendance: 3,941; Referees: Simone, Monitillo (ITA)
25 January 2020; 15:00	Flippes, Zaadi 5	(11–11)	Managarova 6	Palais omnisport Les Arènes, Metz; Attendance: 3,941; Referees: Simone, Monitillo (ITA)
25 January 2020; 15:00	1× (yellow card) 4× (suspension)	Report	3× (yellow card) 5× (suspension)	Palais omnisport Les Arènes, Metz; Attendance: 3,941; Referees: Simone, Monitillo (ITA)

25 January 2020; 16:00	FTC-Rail Cargo Hungaria (Hungary)	33–23	(Romania) CSM București	Érd Aréna, Érd; Attendance: 2,200; Referees: Mata, López (ESP)
25 January 2020; 16:00	Schatzl 8	(19–10)	Neagu 7	Érd Aréna, Érd; Attendance: 2,200; Referees: Mata, López (ESP)
25 January 2020; 16:00	1× (yellow card) 3× (suspension)	Report	1× (yellow card) 4× (suspension)	Érd Aréna, Érd; Attendance: 2,200; Referees: Mata, López (ESP)

1 February 2020; 14:00	Rostov-Don (Russia)	33–26	(Norway) Vipers Kristiansand	Rostov-on-Don Palace of Sports, Rostov-on-Don; Attendance: 2,900; Referees: Năstase, Stancu (ROU)
1 February 2020; 14:00	Frolova, Managarova 7	(19–15)	Reistad 8	Rostov-on-Don Palace of Sports, Rostov-on-Don; Attendance: 2,900; Referees: Năstase, Stancu (ROU)
1 February 2020; 14:00	2× (yellow card) 4× (suspension)	Report	3× (yellow card) 2× (suspension)	Rostov-on-Don Palace of Sports, Rostov-on-Don; Attendance: 2,900; Referees: Năstase, Stancu (ROU)

2 February 2020; 14:30	CSM București (Romania)	32–27	(France) Metz Handball	Sala Polivalentă, Bucharest; Attendance: 4,000; Referees: Mitrović, Kažanegra (MNE)
2 February 2020; 14:30	Neagu 14	(16–14)	Sajka 7	Sala Polivalentă, Bucharest; Attendance: 4,000; Referees: Mitrović, Kažanegra (MNE)
2 February 2020; 14:30	4× (suspension)	Report	1× (yellow card) 4× (suspension)	Sala Polivalentă, Bucharest; Attendance: 4,000; Referees: Mitrović, Kažanegra (MNE)

2 February 2020; 16:50	Team Esbjerg (Denmark)	29–27	(Hungary) FTC-Rail Cargo Hungaria	Blue Water Dokken, Esbjerg; Attendance: 2,102; Referees: Antić, Jakovljević (SRB)
2 February 2020; 16:50	Polman 8	(13–13)	Lukács 6	Blue Water Dokken, Esbjerg; Attendance: 2,102; Referees: Antić, Jakovljević (SRB)
2 February 2020; 16:50	1× (yellow card) 2× (suspension)	Report	1× (yellow card) 3× (suspension)	Blue Water Dokken, Esbjerg; Attendance: 2,102; Referees: Antić, Jakovljević (SRB)

8 February 2020; 19:00	Vipers Kristiansand (Norway)	23–25	(Romania) CSM București	Aquarama Kristiansand, Kristiansand; Attendance: 1,830; Referees: Opava, Válek (CZE)
8 February 2020; 19:00	Aune, Tomac 6	(12–11)	Neagu 14	Aquarama Kristiansand, Kristiansand; Attendance: 1,830; Referees: Opava, Válek (CZE)
8 February 2020; 19:00	3× (yellow card) 3× (suspension)	Report	3× (yellow card) 5× (suspension)	Aquarama Kristiansand, Kristiansand; Attendance: 1,830; Referees: Opava, Válek (CZE)

8 February 2020; 20:00	FTC-Rail Cargo Hungaria (Hungary)	31–35	(Russia) Rostov-Don	Érd Aréna, Érd; Attendance: 2,200; Referees: Freitas, Carvalho (POR)
8 February 2020; 20:00	Klujber 9	(14–19)	Managarova, Vyakhireva 9	Érd Aréna, Érd; Attendance: 2,200; Referees: Freitas, Carvalho (POR)
8 February 2020; 20:00	2× (yellow card) 4× (suspension)	Report	1× (yellow card) 3× (suspension)	Érd Aréna, Érd; Attendance: 2,200; Referees: Freitas, Carvalho (POR)

9 February 2020; 15:00	Metz Handball (France)	31–31	(Denmark) Team Esbjerg	Palais omnisport Les Arènes, Metz; Attendance: 4,122; Referees: Tzaferopoulos, Bethmann (GRE)
9 February 2020; 15:00	Flippes, Kanor 5	(15–15)	Polman 9	Palais omnisport Les Arènes, Metz; Attendance: 4,122; Referees: Tzaferopoulos, Bethmann (GRE)
9 February 2020; 15:00	2× (yellow card) 2× (suspension)	Report	3× (yellow card) 5× (suspension)	Palais omnisport Les Arènes, Metz; Attendance: 4,122; Referees: Tzaferopoulos, Bethmann (GRE)

21 February 2020; 17:30	CSM București (Romania)	27–24	(Hungary) FTC-Rail Cargo Hungaria	Sala Polivalentă, Bucharest; Attendance: 4,500; Referees: Novikov, Rozhkov (UKR)
21 February 2020; 17:30	Neagu 8	(13–10)	Lukács 7	Sala Polivalentă, Bucharest; Attendance: 4,500; Referees: Novikov, Rozhkov (UKR)
21 February 2020; 17:30	1× (yellow card) 4× (suspension)	Report	3× (yellow card) 3× (suspension)	Sala Polivalentă, Bucharest; Attendance: 4,500; Referees: Novikov, Rozhkov (UKR)

22 February 2020; 14:00	Rostov-Don (Russia)	24–29	(France) Metz Handball	Rostov-on-Don Palace of Sports, Rostov-on-Don; Attendance: 3,417; Referees: Bennani, Bennani (SWE)
22 February 2020; 14:00	Managarova 4	(11–11)	three players 5	Rostov-on-Don Palace of Sports, Rostov-on-Don; Attendance: 3,417; Referees: Bennani, Bennani (SWE)
22 February 2020; 14:00	3× (yellow card) 3× (suspension)	Report	2× (yellow card) 4× (suspension) 1× (red card)	Rostov-on-Don Palace of Sports, Rostov-on-Don; Attendance: 3,417; Referees: Bennani, Bennani (SWE)

23 February 2020; 16:50	Team Esbjerg (Denmark)	35–30	(Norway) Vipers Kristiansand	Blue Water Dokken, Esbjerg; Attendance: 2,412; Referees: Panayides, Andreou (CYP)
23 February 2020; 16:50	Breistøl, Polman 8	(15–16)	Tomac 10	Blue Water Dokken, Esbjerg; Attendance: 2,412; Referees: Panayides, Andreou (CYP)
23 February 2020; 16:50	2× (yellow card) 2× (suspension)	Report	3× (yellow card) 6× (suspension) 1× (red card)	Blue Water Dokken, Esbjerg; Attendance: 2,412; Referees: Panayides, Andreou (CYP)

29 February 2020; 19:15	Vipers Kristiansand (Norway)	29–32	(Russia) Rostov-Don	Aquarama Kristiansand, Kristiansand; Attendance: 1,452; Referees: Marín, García (ESP)
29 February 2020; 19:15	Reistad 9	(16–15)	Vyakhireva 10	Aquarama Kristiansand, Kristiansand; Attendance: 1,452; Referees: Marín, García (ESP)
29 February 2020; 19:15	2× (yellow card) 4× (suspension)	Report	2× (yellow card) 4× (suspension)	Aquarama Kristiansand, Kristiansand; Attendance: 1,452; Referees: Marín, García (ESP)

1 March 2020; 15:00	Metz Handball (France)	28–26	(Romania) CSM București	Palais omnisport Les Arènes, Metz; Attendance: 4,000; Referees: Sa, Sa (POR)
1 March 2020; 15:00	Zaadi 6	(14–13)	Lekić, Omoregie 5	Palais omnisport Les Arènes, Metz; Attendance: 4,000; Referees: Sa, Sa (POR)
1 March 2020; 15:00	3× (yellow card) 2× (suspension)	Report	2× (yellow card) 4× (suspension)	Palais omnisport Les Arènes, Metz; Attendance: 4,000; Referees: Sa, Sa (POR)

1 March 2020; 15:00	FTC-Rail Cargo Hungaria (Hungary)	26–25	(Denmark) Team Esbjerg	Érd Aréna, Érd; Attendance: 2,000; Referees: Hatipoğlu, Şimşek (TUR)
1 March 2020; 15:00	Klujber 12	(13–15)	Polman 10	Érd Aréna, Érd; Attendance: 2,000; Referees: Hatipoğlu, Şimşek (TUR)
1 March 2020; 15:00	1× (yellow card) 4× (suspension)	Report	3× (yellow card) 2× (suspension)	Érd Aréna, Érd; Attendance: 2,000; Referees: Hatipoğlu, Şimşek (TUR)

7 March 2020; 14:00	Rostov-Don (Russia)	29–26	(Hungary) FTC-Rail Cargo Hungaria	Rostov-on-Don Palace of Sports, Rostov-on-Don; Attendance: 2,971; Referees: Jerlecki, Labun (POL)
7 March 2020; 14:00	Sen, Vyakhireva 6	(17–9)	Klujber 9	Rostov-on-Don Palace of Sports, Rostov-on-Don; Attendance: 2,971; Referees: Jerlecki, Labun (POL)
7 March 2020; 14:00	2× (yellow card) 5× (suspension)	Report	1× (yellow card) 4× (suspension)	Rostov-on-Don Palace of Sports, Rostov-on-Don; Attendance: 2,971; Referees: Jerlecki, Labun (POL)

7 March 2020; 18:00	CSM București (Romania)	28–22	(Norway) Vipers Kristiansand	Sala Polivalentă, Bucharest; Attendance: 4,500; Referees: Lončar, Lončar (CRO)
7 March 2020; 18:00	Neagu 10	(12–11)	three players 4	Sala Polivalentă, Bucharest; Attendance: 4,500; Referees: Lončar, Lončar (CRO)
7 March 2020; 18:00	1× (yellow card) 3× (suspension)	Report	2× (yellow card) 3× (suspension)	Sala Polivalentă, Bucharest; Attendance: 4,500; Referees: Lončar, Lončar (CRO)

8 March 2020; 16:50	Team Esbjerg (Denmark)	30–29	(France) Metz Handball	Blue Water Dokken, Esbjerg; Attendance: 0 Referees: Merz, Kuttler (GER)
8 March 2020; 16:50	Jacobsen 11	(14–19)	three players 4	Blue Water Dokken, Esbjerg; Attendance: 0 Referees: Merz, Kuttler (GER)
8 March 2020; 16:50	2× (suspension)	Report	2× (yellow card) 2× (suspension)	Blue Water Dokken, Esbjerg; Attendance: 0 Referees: Merz, Kuttler (GER)

=== Group 2 ===
Pos	Team	Pld	W	D	L	GF	GA	GD	Pts	Qualification
1	(Hungary) Győri Audi ETO KC	10	9	1	0	309	252	+57	19	Quarterfinals
2	(France) Brest Bretagne Handball	10	8	1	1	311	253	+58	17	Quarterfinals
3	(Montenegro) Budućnost	10	5	0	5	271	266	+5	10	Quarterfinals
4	(Romania) SCM Râmnicu Vâlcea	10	3	1	6	245	252	−7	7	Quarterfinals
5	(Slovenia) Krim Mercator	10	2	1	7	250	291	−41	5	
6	(Sweden) IK Sävehof	10	1	0	9	224	296	−72	2	

Source: EHF
Rules for classification: Tiebreakers

25 January 2020; 14:00	SCM Râmnicu Vâlcea (Romania)	31–16	(Slovenia) Krim Mercator	Traian Sports Hall, Râmnicu Vâlcea; Attendance: 2,239; Referees: Horváth, Marton (HUN)
25 January 2020; 14:00	Glibko 9	(14–8)	Van Kreij 5	Traian Sports Hall, Râmnicu Vâlcea; Attendance: 2,239; Referees: Horváth, Marton (HUN)
25 January 2020; 14:00	2× (yellow card) 3× (suspension)	Report	2× (yellow card) 2× (suspension)	Traian Sports Hall, Râmnicu Vâlcea; Attendance: 2,239; Referees: Horváth, Marton (HUN)

25 January 2020; 19:00	Budućnost (Montenegro)	30–25	(Sweden) IK Sävehof	Bemax Arena, Podgorica; Attendance: 1,985; Referees: Covalciuc, Covalciuc (MDA)
25 January 2020; 19:00	Radičević 10	(18–14)	Lagerbon 7	Bemax Arena, Podgorica; Attendance: 1,985; Referees: Covalciuc, Covalciuc (MDA)
25 January 2020; 19:00	1× (yellow card) 3× (suspension)	Report	1× (yellow card) 2× (suspension)	Bemax Arena, Podgorica; Attendance: 1,985; Referees: Covalciuc, Covalciuc (MDA)

26 January 2020; 19:00	Győri Audi ETO KC (Hungary)	27–27	(France) Brest Bretagne Handball	Audi Aréna, Győr; Attendance: 5,194; Referees: Sa, Sa (POR)
26 January 2020; 19:00	Fodor, Kristiansen 5	(15–17)	Gros 6	Audi Aréna, Győr; Attendance: 5,194; Referees: Sa, Sa (POR)
26 January 2020; 19:00	3× (yellow card) 1× (suspension)	Report	2× (yellow card) 3× (suspension)	Audi Aréna, Győr; Attendance: 5,194; Referees: Sa, Sa (POR)

1 February 2020; 17:00	Győri Audi ETO KC (Hungary)	26–24	(Montenegro) Budućnost	Audi Aréna, Győr; Attendance: 5,437; Referees: Mandák, Rudinský (SVK)
1 February 2020; 17:00	Kurtović 7	(15–12)	Radičević 10	Audi Aréna, Győr; Attendance: 5,437; Referees: Mandák, Rudinský (SVK)
1 February 2020; 17:00	3× (yellow card) 3× (suspension)	Report	2× (yellow card) 2× (suspension)	Audi Aréna, Győr; Attendance: 5,437; Referees: Mandák, Rudinský (SVK)

2 February 2020; 17:00	Krim Mercator (Slovenia)	25–29	(France) Brest Bretagne Handball	Kodeljevo Hall, Ljubljana; Attendance: 1,200; Referees: Praštalo, Balvan (BIH)
2 February 2020; 17:00	Varagić 5	(12–16)	Gros 10	Kodeljevo Hall, Ljubljana; Attendance: 1,200; Referees: Praštalo, Balvan (BIH)
2 February 2020; 17:00	1× (yellow card)	Report	1× (yellow card) 1× (suspension)	Kodeljevo Hall, Ljubljana; Attendance: 1,200; Referees: Praštalo, Balvan (BIH)

2 February 2020; 17:00	IK Sävehof (Sweden)	17–23	(Romania) SCM Râmnicu Vâlcea	Partille Arena, Partille; Attendance: 807; Referees: Gasmi, Gasmi (FRA)
2 February 2020; 17:00	Dano, Mortensen 4	(7–15)	Liščević 6	Partille Arena, Partille; Attendance: 807; Referees: Gasmi, Gasmi (FRA)
2 February 2020; 17:00	2× (yellow card) 2× (suspension)	Report	1× (yellow card) 3× (suspension)	Partille Arena, Partille; Attendance: 807; Referees: Gasmi, Gasmi (FRA)

8 February 2020; 14:00	SCM Râmnicu Vâlcea (Romania)	20–29	(Hungary) Győri Audi ETO KC	Traian Sports Hall, Râmnicu Vâlcea; Attendance: 2,239; Referees: Merz, Kuttler (GER)
8 February 2020; 14:00	Elghaoui 7	(6–10)	Kristiansen 9	Traian Sports Hall, Râmnicu Vâlcea; Attendance: 2,239; Referees: Merz, Kuttler (GER)
8 February 2020; 14:00	2× (yellow card) 7× (suspension)	Report	1× (yellow card) 2× (suspension)	Traian Sports Hall, Râmnicu Vâlcea; Attendance: 2,239; Referees: Merz, Kuttler (GER)

8 February 2020; 19:00	Budućnost (Montenegro)	30–28	(Slovenia) Krim Mercator	Bemax Arena, Podgorica; Attendance: 2,200; Referees: Alpaidze, Berezkina (RUS)
8 February 2020; 19:00	Radičević 10	(17–12)	Klemenčič, Varagić 6	Bemax Arena, Podgorica; Attendance: 2,200; Referees: Alpaidze, Berezkina (RUS)
8 February 2020; 19:00	1× (yellow card) 4× (suspension)	Report	1× (yellow card) 4× (suspension)	Bemax Arena, Podgorica; Attendance: 2,200; Referees: Alpaidze, Berezkina (RUS)

9 February 2020; 19:00	Brest Bretagne Handball (France)	31–22	(Sweden) IK Sävehof	Brest Arena, Brest; Attendance: 4,092; Referees: Doychinov, Goretsov (BUL)
9 February 2020; 19:00	Pop-Lazić 7	(14–7)	Dano 5	Brest Arena, Brest; Attendance: 4,092; Referees: Doychinov, Goretsov (BUL)
9 February 2020; 19:00	1× (yellow card) 2× (suspension)	Report	2× (yellow card) 2× (suspension)	Brest Arena, Brest; Attendance: 4,092; Referees: Doychinov, Goretsov (BUL)

22 February 2020; 13:30	IK Sävehof (Sweden)	24–33	(Montenegro) Budućnost	Partille Arena, Partille; Attendance: 863; Referees: Kijauskaitė, Žalienė (LTU)
22 February 2020; 13:30	Ekenman-Fernis 9	(17–15)	Raičević 8	Partille Arena, Partille; Attendance: 863; Referees: Kijauskaitė, Žalienė (LTU)
22 February 2020; 13:30	1× (yellow card) 2× (suspension)	Report	2× (yellow card) 6× (suspension)	Partille Arena, Partille; Attendance: 863; Referees: Kijauskaitė, Žalienė (LTU)

22 February 2020; 19:00	Krim Mercator (Slovenia)	28–28	(Romania) SCM Râmnicu Vâlcea	Kodeljevo Hall, Ljubljana; Attendance: 1,118; Referees: Lidacka, Lesiak (POL)
22 February 2020; 19:00	Van Kreij 8	(13–12)	González 7	Kodeljevo Hall, Ljubljana; Attendance: 1,118; Referees: Lidacka, Lesiak (POL)
22 February 2020; 19:00	2× (yellow card) 3× (suspension)	Report	2× (yellow card) 4× (suspension) 1× (red card)	Kodeljevo Hall, Ljubljana; Attendance: 1,118; Referees: Lidacka, Lesiak (POL)

23 February 2020; 19:00	Brest Bretagne Handball (France)	28–29	(Hungary) Győri Audi ETO KC	Brest Arena, Brest; Attendance: 4,222; Referees: Florescu, Stoia (ROU)
23 February 2020; 19:00	Foppa, Gros 7	(15–14)	Kristiansen 9	Brest Arena, Brest; Attendance: 4,222; Referees: Florescu, Stoia (ROU)
23 February 2020; 19:00	3× (yellow card)	Report	4× (yellow card)	Brest Arena, Brest; Attendance: 4,222; Referees: Florescu, Stoia (ROU)

29 February 2020; 14:00	SCM Râmnicu Vâlcea (Romania)	28–20	(Sweden) IK Sävehof	Traian Sports Hall, Râmnicu Vâlcea; Attendance: 2,150; Referees: Fremstad, Pedersen (NOR)
29 February 2020; 14:00	González 7	(16–10)	Lagerbon 5	Traian Sports Hall, Râmnicu Vâlcea; Attendance: 2,150; Referees: Fremstad, Pedersen (NOR)
29 February 2020; 14:00	1× (yellow card) 3× (suspension)	Report	1× (yellow card) 1× (suspension)	Traian Sports Hall, Râmnicu Vâlcea; Attendance: 2,150; Referees: Fremstad, Pedersen (NOR)

29 February 2020; 15:00	Brest Bretagne Handball (France)	37–26	(Slovenia) Krim Mercator	Brest Arena, Brest; Attendance: 3,770; Referees: Praštalo, Balvan (BIH)
29 February 2020; 15:00	Foppa 8	(19–14)	Van Kreij 6	Brest Arena, Brest; Attendance: 3,770; Referees: Praštalo, Balvan (BIH)
29 February 2020; 15:00	1× (yellow card) 2× (suspension)	Report	1× (yellow card) 5× (suspension)	Brest Arena, Brest; Attendance: 3,770; Referees: Praštalo, Balvan (BIH)

1 March 2020; 17:00	Budućnost (Montenegro)	27–28	(Hungary) Győri Audi ETO KC	Morača Sports Center, Podgorica; Attendance: 3,100; Referees: Ilieva, Karbeska (MKD)
1 March 2020; 17:00	Radičević 7	(17–12)	Bulatović 8	Morača Sports Center, Podgorica; Attendance: 3,100; Referees: Ilieva, Karbeska (MKD)
1 March 2020; 17:00	4× (yellow card) 1× (suspension)	Report	3× (yellow card) 2× (suspension)	Morača Sports Center, Podgorica; Attendance: 3,100; Referees: Ilieva, Karbeska (MKD)

7 March 2020; 16:00	Győri Audi ETO KC (Hungary)	35–29	(Romania) SCM Râmnicu Vâlcea	Audi Aréna, Győr; Attendance: 5,329; Referees: Simone, Monitillo (ITA)
7 March 2020; 16:00	Oftedal 6	(20–15)	three players 5	Audi Aréna, Győr; Attendance: 5,329; Referees: Simone, Monitillo (ITA)
7 March 2020; 16:00	1× (yellow card) 4× (suspension)	Report	3× (yellow card) 4× (suspension)	Audi Aréna, Győr; Attendance: 5,329; Referees: Simone, Monitillo (ITA)

7 March 2020; 19:00	Krim Mercator (Slovenia)	29–23	(Montenegro) Budućnost	Kodeljevo Hall, Ljubljana; Attendance: 0 Referees: Freitas, Carvalho (POR)
7 March 2020; 19:00	Zulić 10	(14–13)	Radičević 6	Kodeljevo Hall, Ljubljana; Attendance: 0 Referees: Freitas, Carvalho (POR)
7 March 2020; 19:00	3× (yellow card) 6× (suspension)	Report	5× (suspension)	Kodeljevo Hall, Ljubljana; Attendance: 0 Referees: Freitas, Carvalho (POR)

8 March 2020; 15:00	IK Sävehof (Sweden)	17–29	(France) Brest Bretagne Handball	Partille Arena, Partille; Referees: Antić, Jakovljević (SRB)
8 March 2020; 15:00	Lagerbon 4	(5–17)	Gros 6	Partille Arena, Partille; Referees: Antić, Jakovljević (SRB)
8 March 2020; 15:00	2× (yellow card) 4× (suspension)	Report	1× (yellow card) 2× (suspension)	Partille Arena, Partille; Referees: Antić, Jakovljević (SRB)
