= 2019–20 Women's EHF Champions League =

Women's EHF Champions League
- 2019–20

Tournament information
- Sport: Handball
- Dates: 7 September 2019–8 March 2020
- Teams: 16 (group stage); 4 (qualification)
- Website: ehfcl.com

Final positions
- Champions: No winners crowned
- Runner-up: No runners-up crowned

Tournament statistics
- Matches played: 84
- Goals scored: 4643 (55.27 per match)
- Attendance: 215,898 (2,570 per match)
- Top scorer(s): (Montenegro) Jovanka Radičević (97 goals)

The 2019–20 Women's EHF Champions League was the 27th edition of the Women's EHF Champions League, the competition for top women's clubs of Europe, organized and supervised by the European Handball Federation.

Győri Audi ETO KC were the defending champions.

Because of the Coronavirus pandemic, the quarterfinals matches which normally start in early April, were postponed to mid-June, then moved to September and were later cancelled. The final four was first moved from May to September and later cancelled.

== Format ==
16 teams were participating in the competition, divided in four groups who played in a round robin, home and away format. The top three teams in each group qualified for the main round.

Main round

The 12 qualified teams were divided in two groups who played in a round robin, home and away format. The points and the goal difference gained against the qualified teams in the first round were carried over. The top four teams in each group qualified for the quarterfinals.

Knockout stage

After the quarterfinals, the culmination of the season, the Women's EHF Final four, would continue in its existing format, with the four top teams from the competition competing for the title.

== Team allocation ==
16 national champions applied for the 27th season based on the EHF ranking list, while further eight teams eligible to play in the Women's EHF Cup have requested an upgrade for the EHF Champions League. Registration of clubs does not equal participation, and the final list of all participants was confirmed by the EHF Executive Committee on Friday 21 June. 15 teams are directly qualified for the group stage.

Group stage
(Hungary) Győri Audi ETO KC	(Montenegro) ŽRK Budućnost	(Russia) Rostov-Don	(France) Metz Handball
(Denmark) Team Esbjerg	(Norway) Vipers Kristiansand	(Germany) SG BBM Bietigheim	(Slovenia) Krim Merkator
(Sweden) IK Sävehof	(Poland) MKS Perła Lublin	(Croatia) Podravka Vegeta	(Romania) SCM Râmnicu Vâlcea
(Hungary) FTC-Rail Cargo Hungaria	(Romania) CSM București	(France) Brest Bretagne Handball	Qualifier
Qualification tournament
(Spain) Rocasa Gran Canaria	(Serbia) ŽORK Jagodina	(Czech Republic) DHK Baník Most	(Turkey) Kastamonu GSK

== Round and draw dates ==
The hosting rights for the qualification tournament were drawn on 26 June 2019 and the group stage draw on 27 June 2019 in Vienna, Austria.

Phase	Draw date
Qualification tournaments	26 June 2019
Group stage	27 June 2019
Knockout stage	27 June 2019
Final Four (Budapest)	Cancelled

== Qualification stage ==
The four teams played a semifinal and final to determine the last participant for the group stage. The hosting rights for the qualification tournament were drawn on 26 June 2019. The winner of the qualification tournament advanced to the group stage.

=== Qualification tournament ===
Semifinals
7 September
(Spain) Rocasa Gran Canaria	21
(Czech Republic) DHK Baník Most	28
7 September
(Turkey) Kastamonu GSK	31
(Serbia) ŽORK Jagodina	15

Final
8 September
(Czech Republic) DHK Baník Most	35
(Turkey) Kastamonu GSK	33
Third place
8 September
(Spain) Rocasa Gran Canaria	28
(Serbia) ŽORK Jagodina	15

== Group stage ==
The draw was held on 27 June 2019. In each group, teams played against each other in a double round-robin format, with home and away matches. The top three teams advanced to the main round.

Tiebreakers
In the group stage, teams are ranked according to points (2 points for a win, 1 point for a draw, 0 points for a loss). After completion of the group stage, if two or more teams have scored the same number of points, the ranking will be determined as follows:
1. Highest number of points in matches between the teams directly involved;
2. Superior goal difference in matches between the teams directly involved;
3. Highest number of goals scored in matches between the teams directly involved (or in the away match in case of a two-team tie);
4. Superior goal difference in all matches of the group;
5. Highest number of plus goals in all matches of the group;

If the ranking of one of these teams is determined, the above criteria are consecutively followed until the ranking of all teams is determined. If no ranking can be determined, a decision shall be obtained by EHF through drawing of lots.

During the group stage, only criteria 4–5 apply to determine the provisional ranking of teams.

=== Group A ===
Pos	Team	Pld	W	D	L	GF	GA	GD	Pts	Qualification	MET	VIP	FER	POD
1	(France) Metz Handball	6	4	2	0	194	158	+36	10	Main round	—	26–17	24–24	40–26
2	(Norway) Vipers Kristiansand	6	3	1	2	178	168	+10	7	Main round	38–38	—	31–22	34–28
3	(Hungary) FTC-Rail Cargo Hungaria	6	2	1	3	167	180	−13	5	Main round	28–34	29–34	—	37–31
4	(Croatia) Podravka Vegeta	6	1	0	5	161	194	−33	2	EHF Cup	25–32	25–24	26–27	—

Source: EHF

=== Group B ===
Pos	Team	Pld	W	D	L	GF	GA	GD	Pts	Qualification	ROS	ESB	BUC	LUB
1	(Russia) Rostov-Don	6	4	1	1	167	143	+24	9	Main round	—	34–26	23–22	31–21
2	(Denmark) Team Esbjerg	6	4	0	2	167	149	+18	8	Main round	31–26	—	22–24	35–22
3	(Romania) CSM București	6	3	1	2	153	131	+22	7	Main round	23–23	21–25	—	35–19
4	(Poland) MKS Perła Lublin	6	0	0	6	123	187	−64	0	EHF Cup	20–30	22–28	19–23	—

Source: EHF

=== Group C ===
Pos	Team	Pld	W	D	L	GF	GA	GD	Pts	Qualification	BRE	BUD	VAL	BIE
1	(France) Brest Bretagne Handball	6	6	0	0	201	169	+32	12	Main round	—	32–28	37–24	36–30
2	(Montenegro) Budućnost	6	4	0	2	168	157	+11	8	Main round	32–35	—	23–19	34–28
3	(Romania) SCM Râmnicu Vâlcea	6	1	0	5	148	165	−17	2 (Note: SCM Râmnicu Vâlcea 65–58 SG BBM Bietigheim)	Main round	23–26	20–21	—	34–27
4	(Germany) SG BBM Bietigheim	6	1	0	5	171	197	−26	2	EHF Cup	32–35	23–30	31–28	—

Source: EHF

=== Group D ===
Pos	Team	Pld	W	D	L	GF	GA	GD	Pts	Qualification	GYO	SAV	KRI	BAN
1	(Hungary) Győri Audi ETO KC	6	6	0	0	216	147	+69	12	Main round	—	35–23	31–26	35–29
2	(Sweden) IK Sävehof	6	2	1	3	148	166	−18	5	Main round	27–36	—	21–25	24–19
3	(Slovenia) Krim Mercator	6	2	0	4	158	170	−12	4	Main round	21–33	26–28	—	29–31
4	(Czech Republic) DHK Baník Most	6	1	1	4	151	190	−39	3	EHF Cup	21–46	25–25	26–31	—

Source: EHF

== Main round ==
In each group, teams played against each other in a double round-robin format, with home and away matches. Points against teams from the same group were carried over.

=== Group 1 ===
Pos	Team	Pld	W	D	L	GF	GA	GD	Pts	Qualification	MET	ESB	ROS	BUC	VIP	FER
1	(France) Metz Handball	10	5	3	2	289	270	+19	13 (Note: Metz Handball 5 Pts, +7 GD; Team Esbjerg 5 Pts, −2 GD; Rostov-Don 2 Pts, −5 GD)	Quarterfinals	—	31–31	23–20	28–26	26–17	24–24
2	(Denmark) Team Esbjerg	10	6	1	3	289	279	+10	13	Quarterfinals	30–29	—	31–26	22–24	33–30	29–27
3	(Russia) Rostov-Don	10	6	1	3	279	266	+13	13	Quarterfinals	24–29	34–26	—	23–22	33–26	29–26
4	(Romania) CSM București	10	5	1	4	251	250	+1	11	Quarterfinals	32–27	21–25	23–23	—	28–22	27–24
5	(Norway) Vipers Kristiansand	10	2	1	7	281	303	−22	5 (Note: Vipers Kristiansand 65–51 FTC-Rail Cargo Hungaria)		38–38	31–35	29–32	23–25	—	31–22
6	(Hungary) FTC-Rail Cargo Hungaria	10	2	1	7	270	291	−21	5		28–34	26–25	31–35	33–23	29–34	—

Source: EHF

=== Group 2 ===
Pos	Team	Pld	W	D	L	GF	GA	GD	Pts	Qualification	GYO	BRE	BUD	VAL	KRI	SAV
1	(Hungary) Győri Audi ETO KC	10	9	1	0	309	252	+57	19	Quarterfinals	—	27–27	26–24	35–29	31–26	35–23
2	(France) Brest Bretagne Handball	10	8	1	1	311	253	+58	17	Quarterfinals	28–29	—	32–28	37–24	37–26	31–22
3	(Montenegro) Budućnost	10	5	0	5	271	266	+5	10	Quarterfinals	27–28	32–35	—	23–19	30–28	30–25
4	(Romania) SCM Râmnicu Vâlcea	10	3	1	6	245	252	−7	7	Quarterfinals	20–29	23–26	20–21	—	31–16	28–20
5	(Slovenia) Krim Mercator	10	2	1	7	250	291	−41	5		21–33	25–29	29–23	28–28	—	26–28
6	(Sweden) IK Sävehof	10	1	0	9	224	296	−72	2		27–36	17–29	24–33	17–23	21–25	—

Source: EHF

== Knockout stage ==
On 26 June 2020, EHF announced that the knockout stage, including the quarterfinals and the Final 4 were cancelled due to the COVID-19 pandemic.

=== Quarterfinals ===
The European Handball Federation announced on 13 March 2020 that the quarter-finals matches will not be held as scheduled due to the ongoing developments in the spread of COVID-19 across Europe. The matches were rescheduled on 25 March. The matches were cancelled on 24 April 2020.

Team 1	Agg.	Team 2	1st leg	2nd leg
SCM Râmnicu Vâlcea (Romania)		(France) Metz Handball	Cancelled	Cancelled
CSM București (Romania)		(Hungary) Győri Audi ETO KC	Cancelled	Cancelled
Budućnost (Montenegro)		(Denmark) Team Esbjerg	Cancelled	Cancelled
Rostov-Don (Russia)		(France) Brest Bretagne Handball	Cancelled	Cancelled

== Awards and statistics ==
=== All-Star Team ===
The all-star team and awards were announced on 5 June 2020.

- Goalkeeper: Amandine Leynaud (FRA) (Győri Audi ETO KC)
- Right wing: Jovanka Radičević (MNE) (Budućnost)
- Right back: Anna Vyakhireva (RUS) (Rostov-Don)
- Centre back: Stine Bredal Oftedal (NOR) (Győri Audi ETO KC)
- Left back: Cristina Neagu (ROU) (CSM București)
- Left wing: Sanna Solberg-Isaksen (NOR) (Team Esbjerg)
- Pivot: Asma Elghaoui (HUN) (SCM Râmnicu Vâlcea)

=== Other awards ===
- Best coach: Emmanuel Mayonnade (FRA) (Metz Handball)
- Best young player: Noémi Háfra (HUN) (FTC-Rail Cargo Hungaria)
- Best defence player: Eduarda Amorim (BRA) (Győri Audi ETO KC)

=== Top goalscorers ===
Rank	Player	Club	Goals
1	(Montenegro) Jovanka Radičević	(Montenegro) Budućnost	97
2	(Hungary) Katrin Klujber	(Hungary) FTC-Rail Cargo Hungaria	84
3	(Slovenia) Ana Gros	(France) Brest Bretagne Handball	78
4	(Netherlands) Estavana Polman	(Denmark) Team Esbjerg	74
5	(Romania) Cristina Neagu	(Romania) CSM București	72
6	(Slovenia) Alja Varagić	(Slovenia) Krim Mercator	62
7	(Austria) Sonja Frey	(Denmark) Team Esbjerg	61
8	(Norway) Stine Bredal Oftedal	(Hungary) Győri Audi ETO KC	58
9	(Russia) Anna Vyakhireva	(Russia) Rostov-Don	57
10	(Russia) Yulia Managarova	(Russia) Rostov-Don	56
