= Harma van Kreij =

Dutch handball player (born 1993)

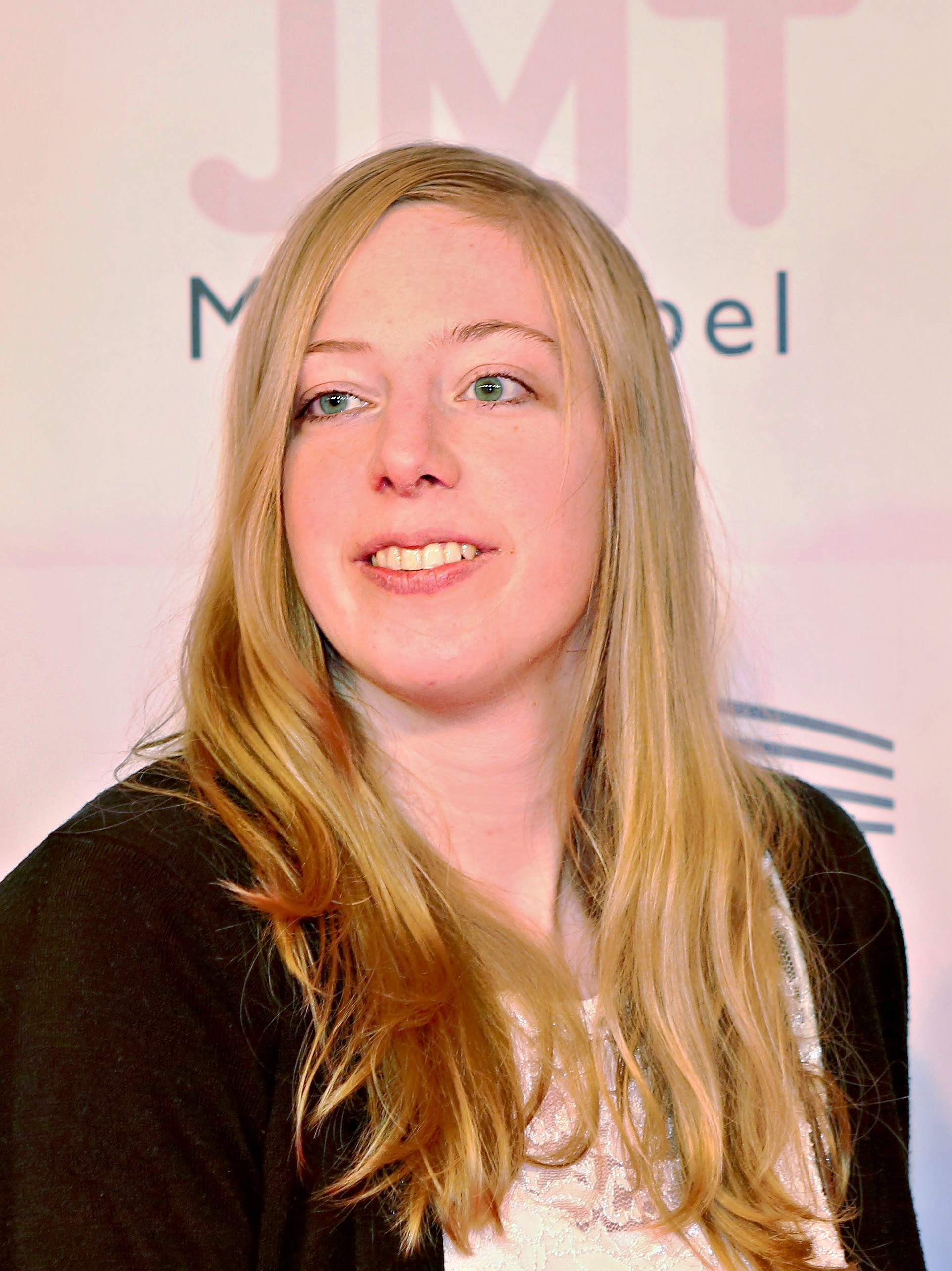
- Harma von Kreij (left) and Irene Espínola Perez at the Kinderlachen-Gala in 2017.

Personal information
- Nationality: Dutch
- Born: 11 November 1993 (age 32) Venray, Netherlands
- Height: 1.75 m (5 ft 9 in)

Sport
- Sport: Handball
- Position: Left back
- Current club: CSM Corona Brașov
- Number: 11

Youth career
- Years: Team
- –: HV Manual Venray

Senior clubs
- Years: Team
- –2012: Bevo HC
- 2012–2014: HandbaL Venlo
- 2014–2016: TuS Lintfort
- 2016–2019: Borussia Dortmund
- 2019–2022: RK Krim
- 2022–2024: Borussia Dortmund
- 2024–: CSM Corona Brașov
National team
| Years | Team | Apps | (Gls) |
| 2020- | Netherlands | 18 | (11) |
- Updated on 1. November 2024

Harma Anna Cornelia van Kreij (born 11 November 1993) is a Dutch female handballer for CSM Corona Brașov.

She represented the Netherlands at the 2020 European Women's Handball Championship.
