= 2019–20 Women's EHF Champions League knockout stage =

Handball tournaments

This article describes the knockout stage of the 2019–20 Women's EHF Champions League.

On 25 March, the EHF announced that no matches will be played before June due to the coronavirus pandemic.

All matches were cancelled on 26 June 2020.

== Qualified teams ==
The top four placed teams from each of the two main round groups advanced to the knockout stage.

Group	First place	Second place	Third place	Fourth place
1	(France) Metz Handball	(Denmark) Team Esbjerg	(Russia) Rostov-Don	(Romania) CSM București
2	(Hungary) Győri Audi ETO KC	(France) Brest Bretagne Handball	(Montenegro) Budućnost	(Romania) SCM Râmnicu Vâlcea

== Format ==
The first-placed team of each group will face the fourth-placed team, and the second-placed team will play against the third-placed team from the other group. After that a draw will be held to determine the pairings for the final four.

== Quarterfinals ==
The European Handball Federation announced on 13 March 2020 that the quarter-finals matches will not be held as scheduled due to the ongoing developments in the spread of COVID-19 across Europe. The matches were rescheduled on 25 March. The matches were cancelled on 24 April 2020, although they might be played before the final four.

=== Overview ===
Team 1	Agg.	Team 2	1st leg	2nd leg
SCM Râmnicu Vâlcea (Romania)		(France) Metz Handball	Cancelled	Cancelled
CSM București (Romania)		(Hungary) Győri Audi ETO KC	Cancelled	Cancelled
Budućnost (Montenegro)		(Denmark) Team Esbjerg	Cancelled	Cancelled
Rostov-Don (Russia)		(France) Brest Bretagne Handball	Cancelled	Cancelled

==== Matches ====
SCM Râmnicu Vâlcea (Romania)	Cancelled	(France) Metz Handball

Metz Handball (France)	Cancelled	(Romania) SCM Râmnicu Vâlcea

CSM București (Romania)	Cancelled	(Hungary) Győri Audi ETO KC

Győri Audi ETO KC (Hungary)	Cancelled	(Romania) CSM București

Budućnost (Montenegro)	Cancelled	(Denmark) Team Esbjerg

Team Esbjerg (Denmark)	Cancelled	(Montenegro) Budućnost

Rostov-Don (Russia)	Cancelled	(France) Brest Bretagne Handball

Brest Bretagne Handball (France)	Cancelled	(Russia) Rostov-Don

== Final four ==
The final four was scheduled to be held at the László Papp Budapest Sports Arena in Budapest, Hungary on 9 and 10 May 2020 but was later rescheduled to 5 and 6 September 2020. If the quarterfinals can't be played, the top-two teams of the main round groups will be playing in the final four.

=== Bracket ===
Semifinals
5 September
5 September

Final
6 September
Third place
6 September

=== Semifinals ===
5 September 2020	TBD	Cancelled	TBD

5 September 2020	TBD	Cancelled	TBD

=== Third place game ===
6 September 2020	LSF1	Cancelled	LSF2

=== Final ===
6 September 2020	WSF1	Cancelled	WSF2
