= Ida Lagerbon =

Danish handball player (born 1998)

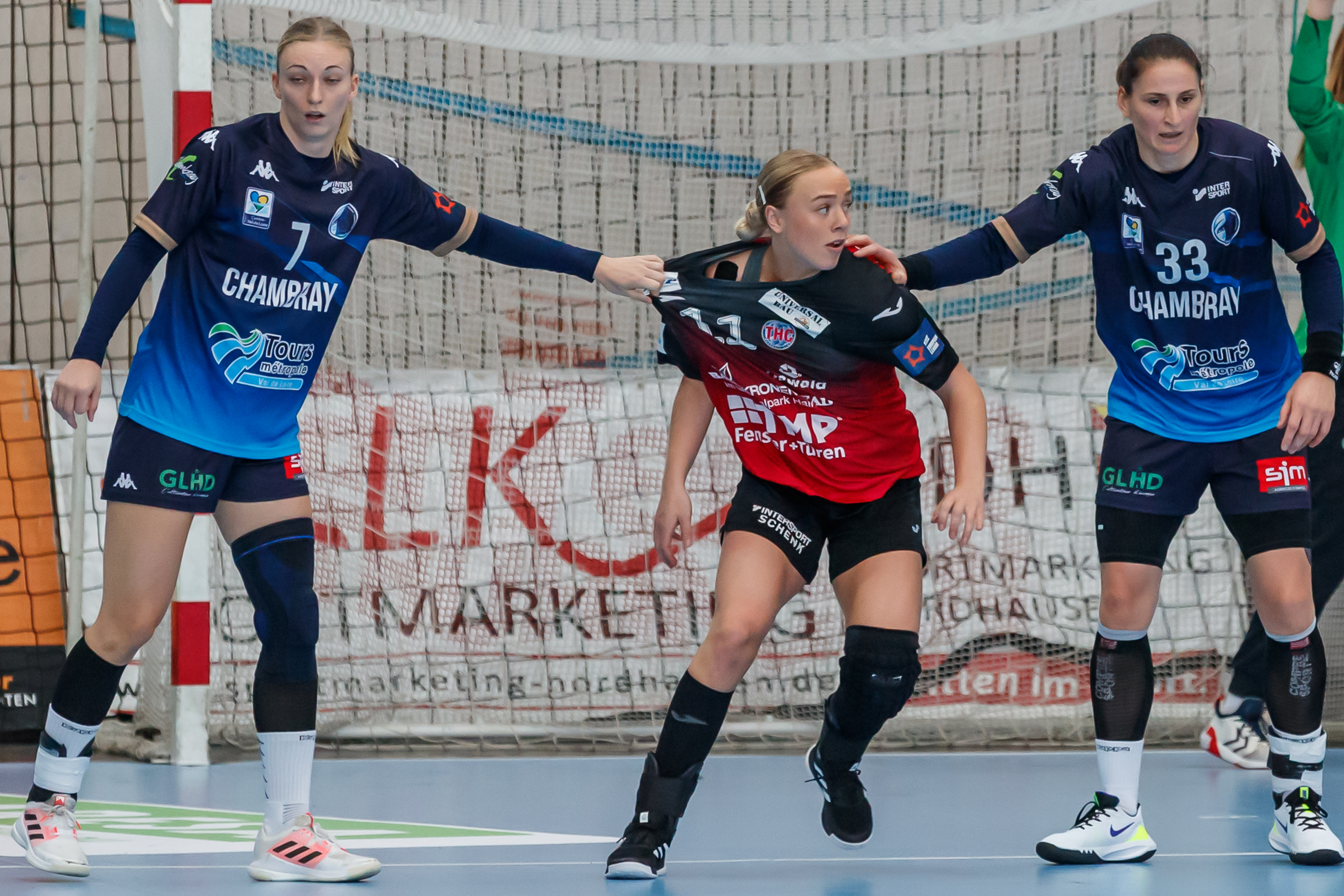
- Lagerbon in 2022 (left)

Personal information
- Full name: Ida Staxen Lagerbon
- Nationality: Danish
- Born: 12 May 1998 (age 28) Næstved, Denmark
- Height: 1.74 m (5 ft 9 in)

Sport
- Sport: Handball
- Position: Left back
- Current club: SønderjyskE Håndbold
- Number: 27

Youth career
- Years: Team
- 2013–2014: BK Ydun
- 2014–2016: FC Midtjylland Håndbold

Senior clubs
- Years: Team
- 2017–2018: Fredericia HK
- 2018–2019: Ringkøbing Håndbold
- 2019–2021: IK Sävehof
- 2021–2023: Chambray Touraine Handball
- 2023–: SønderjyskE Håndbold

Ida Staxen Lagerbon (born 12 May 1998) is a Danish handball player for SønderjyskE Håndbold in the Denmark.

She joined Chambray Touraine Handball for the 2021/22 season, where she played for two seasons. On 1 April 2023, it was announced that she had signed a two-year contract with SønderjyskE Håndbold in Denmark.

== Achievements ==
- Svensk handbollselit:
  - Winner: 2020
  - Runner-up: 2021
- Swedish Handball Cup:
  - Winner: 2023
