= Amelia Lundbäck =

Swedish handball player (born 1998)

Personal information
- Full name: Amelia Lundbäck
- Nationality: Swedish
- Born: 22 September 1998 (age 28) Stensjön, Sweden
- Height: 1.76 m (5 ft 9 in)

Sport
- Sport: Handball
- Position: Centre Back
- Current club: CS Minaur Baia Mare
- Number: 33

Senior clubs
- Years: Team
- 2006-2012: IK Sävehof
- 2012-2016: BK Heid
- 2016-2017: Kungälvs HK
- 2017-2020: IK Sävehof
- 2020-2022: H 65 Höör
- 2022-2023: Skuru IK
- 2023-: CS Minaur Baia Mare

Amelia Lundbäck (born 22 September 1998) is a Swedish handball player who plays for CS Minaur Baia Mare.

== Achievements ==
- SHE:
  - Winner: 2018, 2019
  - Silver: 2021
- Women's EHF Champions League:
  - Best Swedish scorer in Women's EHF Champions League: 2019
