= Trine Mortensen =

Danish handball player (born 1994)

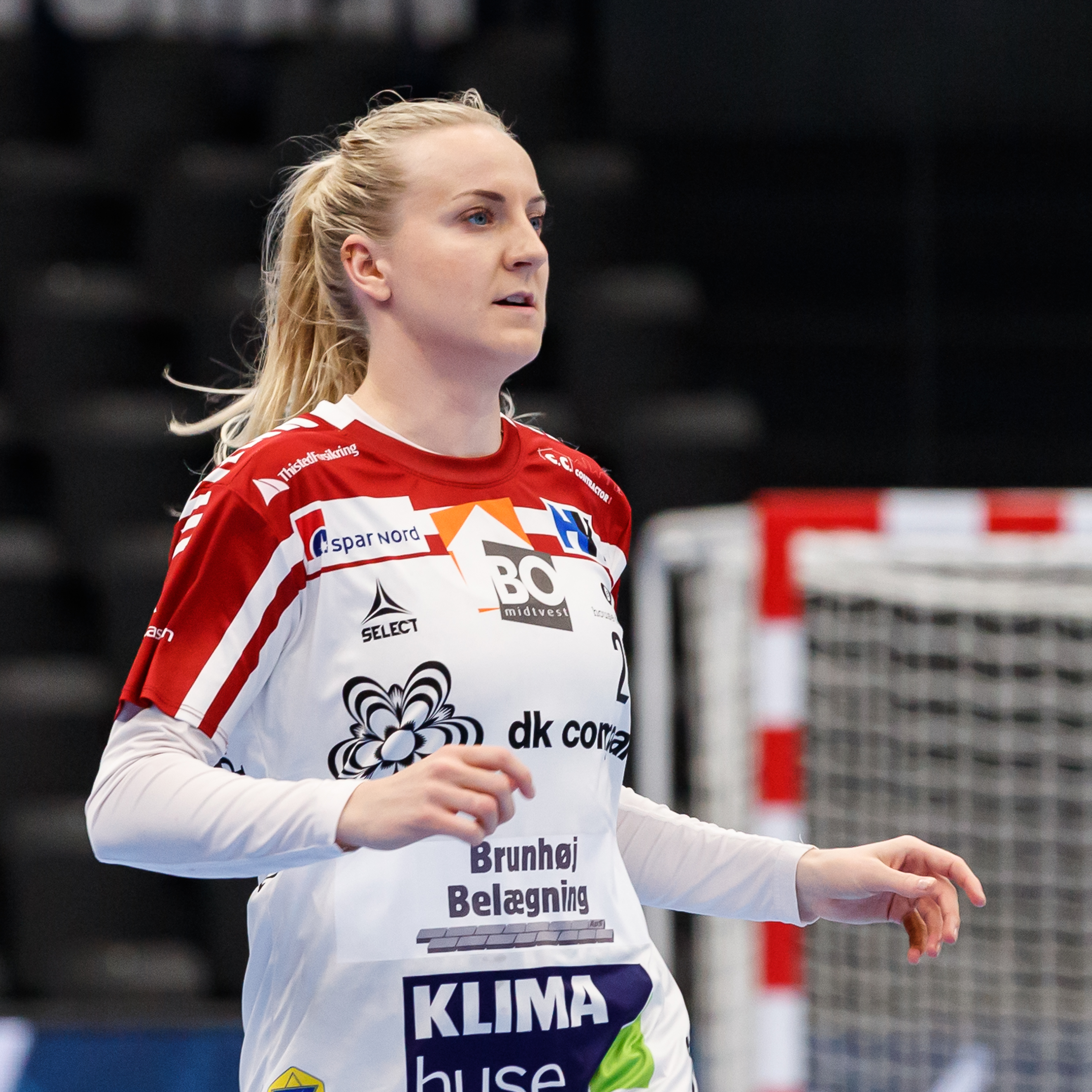

Personal information
- Full name: Trine Elise Wacker Mortensen
- Nationality: Danish
- Born: 14 September 1994 (age 32) Jyllinge, Denmark
- Height: 1.70 m (5 ft 7 in)

Sport
- Sport: Handball
- Position: Left wing
- Current club: Ikast Håndbold
- Number: 6

Youth career
- Years: Team
- 2004–2015: HØJ Elite

Senior clubs
- Years: Team
- 2015–2019: TMS Ringsted
- 2019–2022: IK Sävehof
- 2022–2024: Ikast Håndbold
- 2024-: HØJ Elite
National team
Years	Team	Apps	(Gls)
2022–	Denmark	3	(5)

Trine Elise Wacker Mortensen (born 14 September 1994) is a Danish handball player who plays for HØJ Elite in the Danish 1st Division and the Danish national team.

She made her debut on the Danish national team on 29 September 2022 against Netherlands, appearing for the team during the Golden League Tournament in Eindhoven. She was also part of the extended 35-player squad for the 2023 World Women's Handball Championship

In the 2024–25 season she was promoted with the HØJ Elite to the top flight in Denmark.

== Achievements ==
- Damehåndboldligaen:
  - Bronze Medalist: 2023
- EHF European League:
  - Winner: 2023
- Handbollsligan:
  - Winner: 2022
  - Finalist: 2021
