= Asma Elghaoui =

Tunisian-Hungarian handball player (born 1991)

Personal information
- Nationality: Tunisian, Hungarian, Romanian
- Born: 29 August 1991 (age 35) Monastir, Tunisia
- Height: 1.75 m (5 ft 9 in)

Sport
- Sport: Handball
- Position: Line player
- Current club: SCM Râmnicu Vâlcea

Senior clubs
- Years: Team
- –2013: Ribat Monastir
- 2013–2014: HBC Nîmes
- 2014–2015: Dinamo Sinara
- 2015–2016: Siófok KC
- 2016–2017: Győri ETO KC
- 2017–2019: Siófok KC
- 2019–: SCM Râmnicu Vâlcea
National team
Years	Team	Apps	(Gls)
2009–2016	Tunisia	69	(330)
2018	Hungary	2	(1)
2025-	Romania	2	(4)

Asma Elghaoui (born 29 August 1991) is a Tunisian-born Hungarian, later Romanian female handballer who plays as a pivot for Liga Națională club SCM Râmnicu Vâlcea.

== Achievements ==
- Nemzeti Bajnokság I:
  - Winner: 2017
  - Bronze Medalist: 2019
- Magyar Kupa:
  - Finalist: 2017
- EHF Champions League:
  - Winner: 2017
  - Fourth place: 2015
- EHF Cup:
  - Winner: 2019
- Cupa României :
  - Winner: 2020
- Supercupa României :
  - Winner: 2020
- African Championship:
  - Winner: 2014
  - Silver Medalist: 2012

== Individual awards ==
- All-Star Pivot of the EHF Champions League: 2020
- Pro Sport All-Star Team Pivot of the Liga Națională: 2020
