= Johanna Forsberg =

Swedish handball player (born 1995)

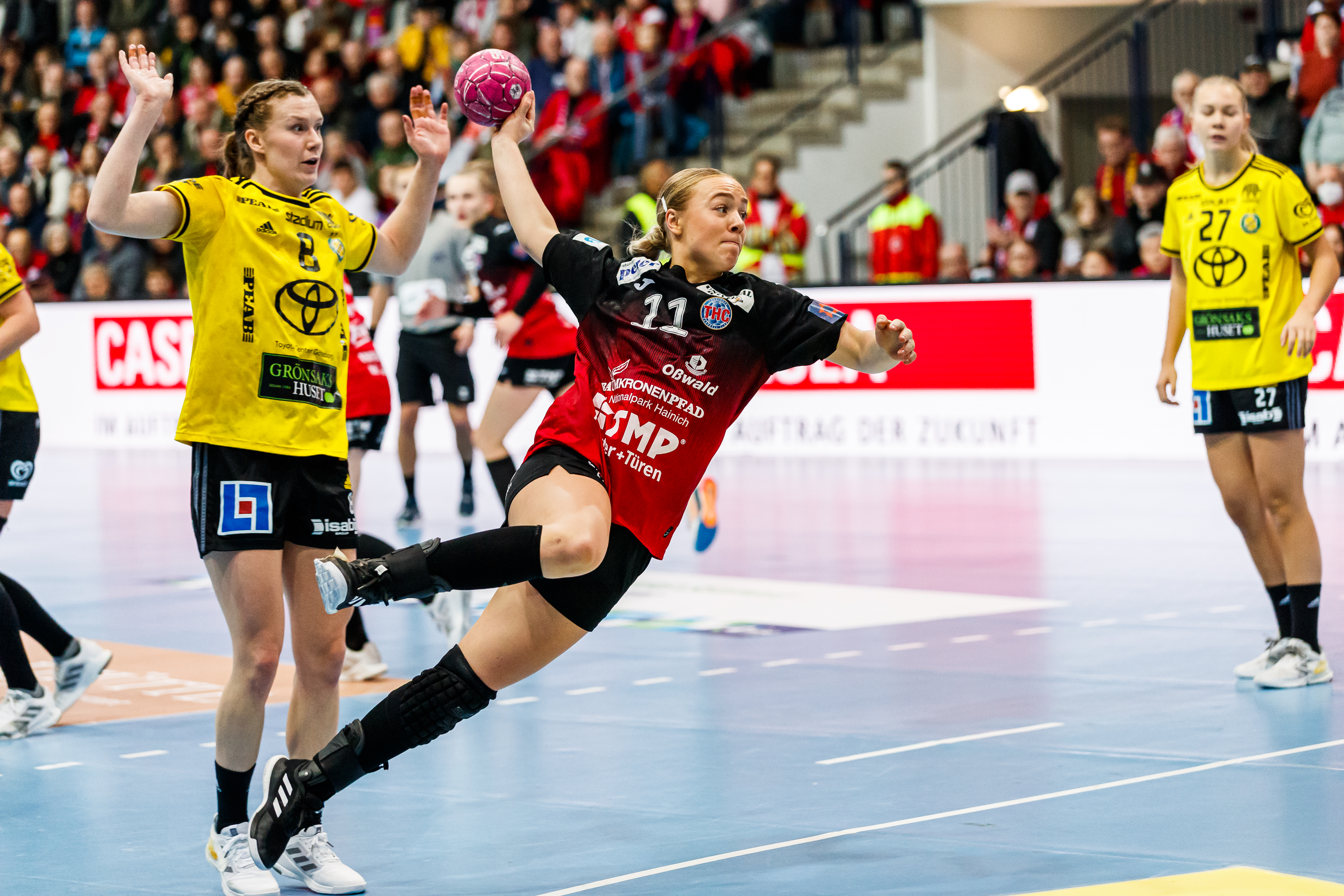

Personal information
- Nationality: Swedish
- Born: 16 October 1995 (age 31) Gothenburg, Sweden
- Height: 1.77 m (5 ft 10 in)

Sport
- Sport: Handball
- Position: Pivot
- Current club: IK Sävehof

Senior clubs
- Years: Team
- 2013–2015: IK Sävehof
- 2015–2017: BK Heid
- 2017–2020: IK Sävehof
- 2020–2022: Nykøbing Falster
- 2022–: IK Sävehof
National team
Years	Team	Apps	(Gls)
2018–	Sweden	27	(22)

Johanna Forsberg (born 16 October 1995) is a Swedish female handball player for IK Sävehof and the Swedish national team.

She represented Sweden at the 2019 World Women's Handball Championship.

== Achievements ==
- SHE:
  - Winner: 2014, 2015, 2018, 2023
- Swedish Cup:
  - Winner: 2023, 2024

Individual awards

- All-Star Team Svensk handbollselit: 2018/19, 2019/20, 2022/23
