= Petra Maňáková =

Czech handball player

Petra Růčková
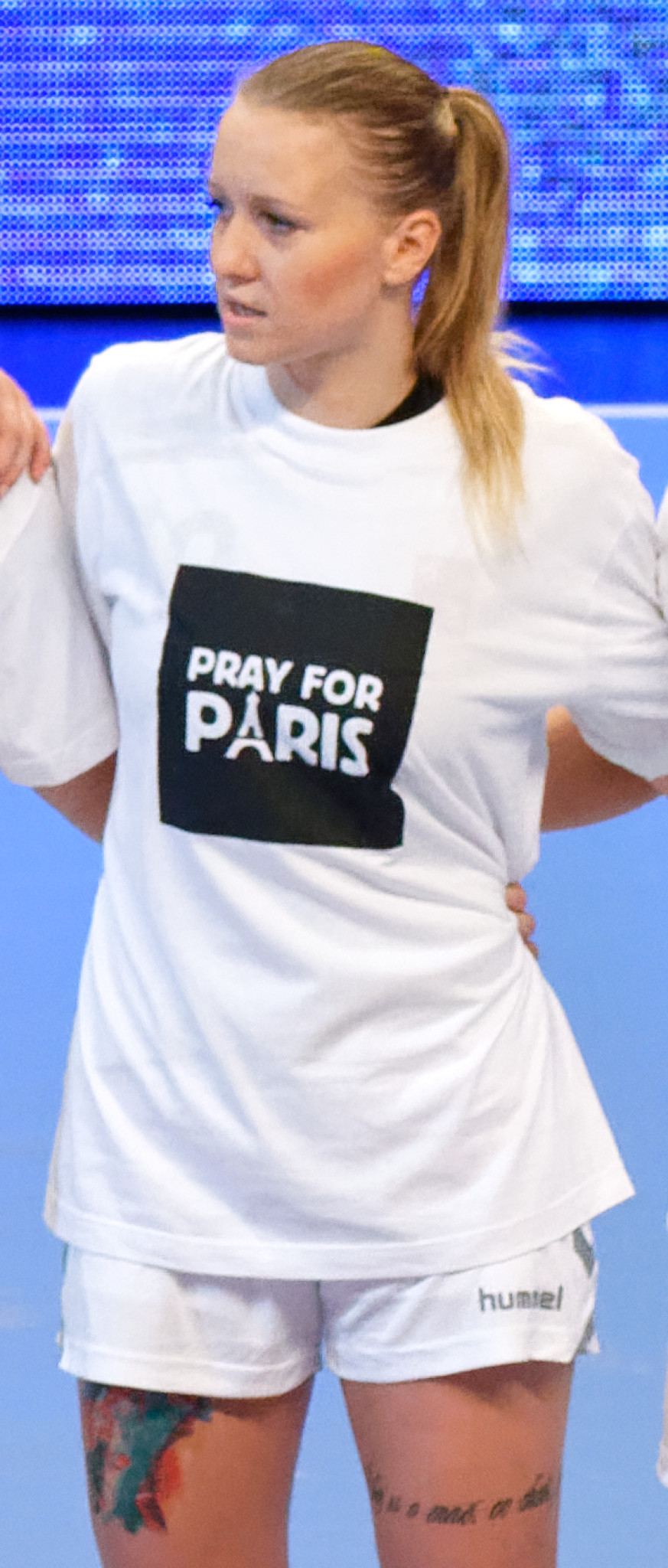

Personal information
- Nationality: Czech
- Born: 9 February 1989 (age 37) Rožnov pod Radhoštěm, Czechoslovakia
- Height: 1.72 m (5 ft 8 in)

Sport
- Sport: Handball
- Position: Centre back
- Current club: DHK Baník Most
- Number: 55
National team
Years	Team	Apps	(Gls)
–	Czech Republic	130	(126)

Petra Růčková (born 8 February 1989) is a Czech handball player for DHK Baník Most and the Czech national team.
