= Stine Oftedal Dahmke =

Norwegian handball player (born 1991)

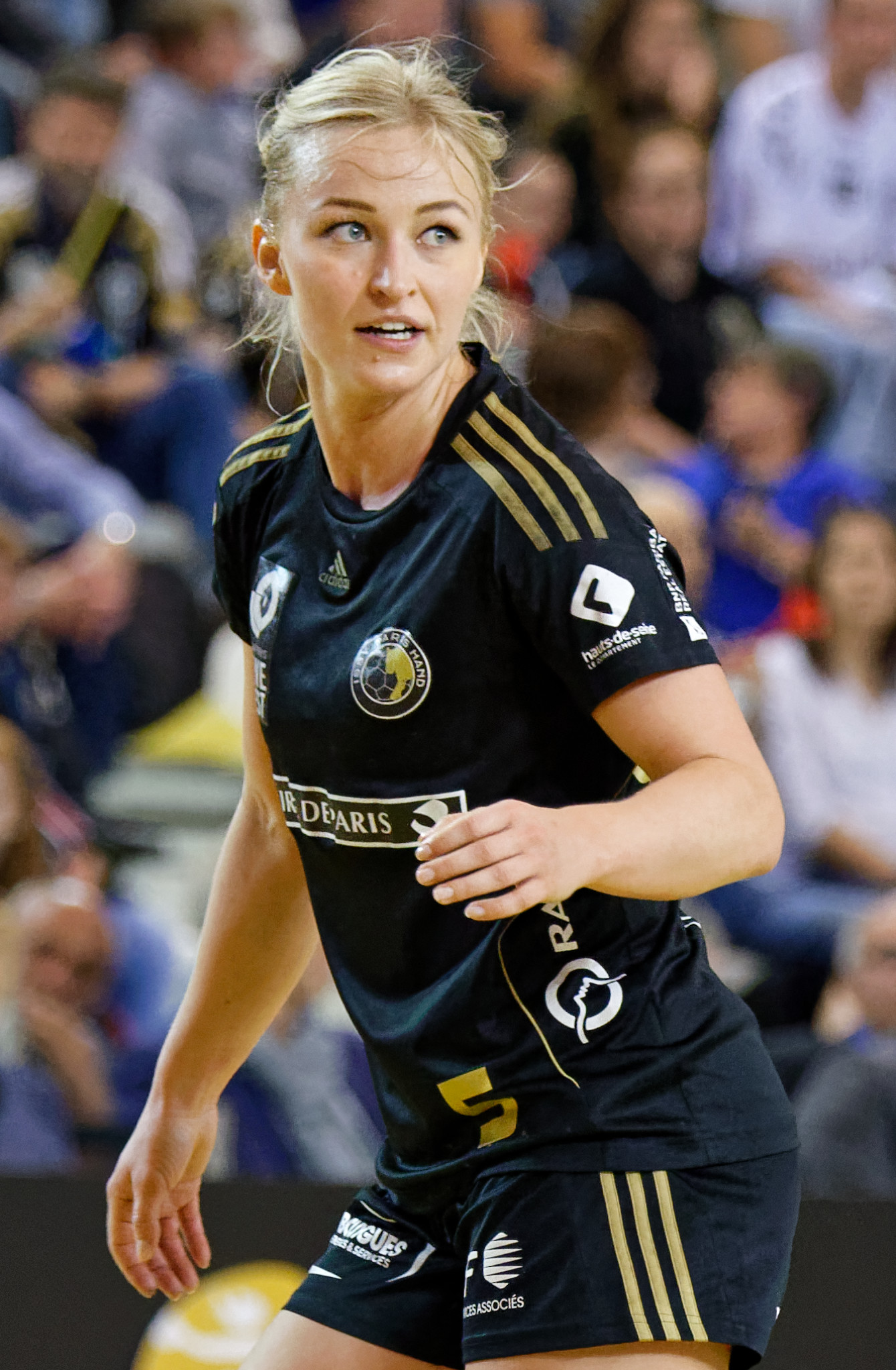
- Oftedal in 2017

Personal information
- Nationality: Norwegian
- Born: Stine Bredal Oftedal; 25 September 1991 (age 35) Oslo, Norway
- Height: 1.68 m (5 ft 6 in)

Sport
- Sport: Handball
- Position: Centre back
- Current club: Retired

Youth career
- Years: Team
- –: Nit/Hak HK

Senior clubs
- Years: Team
- 2007–2008: Helset IF
- 2008–2013: Stabæk IF
- 2013–2017: Issy-Paris Hand
- 2017–2024: Győri ETO KC
National team
Years	Team	Apps	(Gls)
2010–2024	Norway	269	(757)
Medal record
Olympic Games
Gold medal – first place	2024 Paris	Team
Bronze medal – third place	2016 Rio de Janeiro	Team
Bronze medal – third place	2020 Tokyo	Team
World Championship
Gold medal – first place	2011 Brazil
Gold medal – first place	2015 Denmark
Gold medal – first place	2021 Spain
Silver medal – second place	2017 Germany
Silver medal – second place	2023 Denmark/Norway/Sweden
European Championship
Gold medal – first place	2010 Denmark/Norway
Gold medal – first place	2014 Croatia/Hungary
Gold medal – first place	2016 Sweden
Gold medal – first place	2020 Denmark
Gold medal – first place	2022 Slovenia/North Macedonia /Montenegro
Silver medal – second place	2012 Serbia
Junior World Championship
Gold medal – first place	2010 South Korea
Junior European Championship
Gold medal – first place	2009 Hungary

Stine Oftedal Dahmke (née Bredal Oftedal, born 25 September 1991) is a former Norwegian professional handball player for the Norwegian national team, where she was the team captain for nine years and who last played for Győri ETO KC. She is one time Olympic champion, three times World champion and five times European champion with the Norwegian national team. On club level, she won 3 Champions League titles.

She was voted World Handball Player of the Year 2019 by the International Handball Federation.

== Early and personal life ==
Oftedal was born in Nittedal on 25 September 1991. She is the older sister of fellow handball player Hanna Bredal Oftedal.

She studied at BI Norwegian Business School. Previously she competed for Nittedal IL in the javelin throw, throwing 32.08 m at the age 13.

She is married to fellow handballer, Rune Dahmke. Their daughter, Amelie was born in July 2025.

== Club career ==
Ofredal hails from Nittedal and started her career in Nit/Hak HK. She then continued to Fjellhammer IL before continuing to Helset IF. Helset is a feeder team for Stabæk Håndball, and so she played for Stabæk from the 2008–09 season while still being registered in Helset.

From 2013 to 2017 she played for the French club Issy-Paris Hand. During this period she was selected player of the year in the French top league three times, in 2014, 2016 and 2017. From 2017 she played for the Hungarian club Győri ETO KC, and won the Women's EHF Champions League with this club in 2018, 2019 and 2024.

== International career ==
Playing for the Norwegian national team, Oftedal has been the team captain since 2015 until here retirement after winning the European championship 2024. Her achievements with the Norwegian team include winning the IHF World Women's Handball Championship in 2011, 2015 and 2021, and winning the European Women's Handball Championship in 2010, 2014, 2016, 2020 and 2022. She won three Olympic medals, a gold medal at the 2024 Summer Olympics, and two bronze medals at the 2016 and 2020 Summer Olympics.

== Achievements ==
=== National team ===
- Olympic Games:
  - Winner: 2024
  - Bronze Medalist: 2016, 2020
- World Championship:
  - Winner: 2011, 2015, 2021
  - Silver Medalist: 2017, 2023
- European Championship:
  - Winner: 2010, 2014, 2016, 2020, 2022
  - Silver Medalist: 2012
- Junior World Championship:
  - Winner: 2010
- Junior European Championship:
  - Winner: 2009

=== European ===
- EHF Champions League:
  - Winner: 2018, 2019, 2024
  - Finalist: 2022
  - Bronze medalist: 2021, 2023

=== Domestic ===
- Nemzeti Bajnokság I
  - Winner: 2018, 2019, 2022, 2023
- Hungarian Cup:
  - Winner: 2018, 2019, 2021
- Norwegian Cup:
  - Finalist: 2011, 2012

== Individual awards ==
- IHF World Player of the Year: 2019, 2024
- All-Star centre back of the Summer Olympics: 2024
- EHF Excellence Awards: Left Back of the Season 2023/24
- EHF Excellence Awards: MVP of the Season 2023/24
- All-Star Left Wing of the U18 European Open: 2008
- All-Star Centre Back of the Junior World Championship: 2010
- All-Star Centre Back of Postenligaen: 2010/2011
- French Championship MVP: 2014
- All-Star Centre Back of the World Championship: 2015, 2023
- French Championship Best Playmaker: 2014, 2016
- Most Valuable Player of the World Championship: 2017
- All-Star Centre Back of the European Championship: 2018, 2020, 2022
- All-Star Centre Back of the EHF Champions League: 2019, 2020, 2021, 2022
- MVP EHF Champions League Final4: 2024
- Handball-Planet.com All-Star Centre Back of the Year: 2019
- Foreign Handballer of the Year in Hungary: 2019
- The One Best Woman Player by Upskill Handball: 2024
- She was awarded the Håndballstatuetten trophy from the Norwegian Handball Federation in 2024.
