= Jovanka Radičević =

Montenegrin handball player (born 1986)

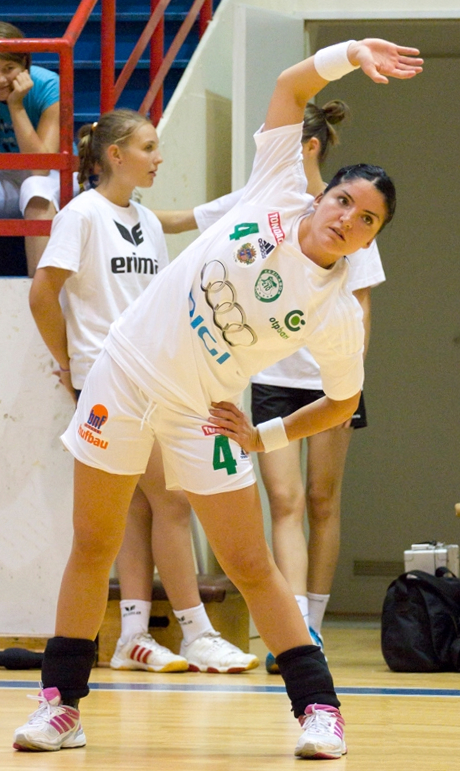

Personal information
- Nationality: Montenegrin
- Born: 23 October 1986 (age 39) Titograd, SR Montenegro, SFR Yugoslavia
- Height: 1.69 m (5 ft 7 in)

Sport
- Sport: Handball
- Position: Right wing

Senior clubs
- Years: Team
- 2004–2011: ŽRK Budućnost Podgorica
- 2011–2013: Győri ETO KC
- 2013–2018: ŽRK Vardar Skopje
- 2018–2019: CSM București
- 2019–2021: ŽRK Budućnost Podgorica
- 2021–2022: Kastamonu
- 2022–2025: RK Krim
National team
Years	Team	Apps	(Gls)
2006–2022	Montenegro	192	(1103)
Medal record
Olympic Games
Silver medal – second place	2012 London	Team
European Championship
Gold medal – first place	2012 Serbia
Bronze medal – third place	2022 Slovenia/North Macedonia/Montenegro
Mediterranean Games
Bronze medal – third place	2009 Pescara	Team
European Junior Championship
Bronze medal – third place	2004 Czech Republic

Jovanka Radičević (born 23 October 1986) is a Montenegrin former handball player.

She was part of the Montenegrin team that won their first ever international title at the 2012 European Women's Handball Championship.

== International honours ==
- EHF Champions League:
  - Gold:Winner: 2013
  - Silver: Silver Medalist: 2012, 2017, 2018
- EHF Cup Winners' Cup:
  - Gold: Winner: 2006, 2010
- European Championship:
  - Gold: Winner: 2012
  - Bronze: Bronze Medalist: 2022
- Olympic Games:
  - Silver: Silver Medalist: 2012

== Individual awards ==
- All-Star Right Wing of the European Championship: 2012, 2020, 2022
- All-Star Team of the EHF Champions League: 2014, 2016, 2019, 2020
- All-Star Right Wing of the World Championship: 2015, 2019
- Handball-Planet.com All-Star Right Wing: 2015, 2017, 2018, 2019
- EHF Champions League Top Scorer: 2020
- Balkan-Handball.com Ex-Yugoslavian Handballer of the Year: 2018, 2019
- Gala Premiilor Handbalului Românesc Liga Națională Right Wing of the Season: 2019

== See also ==
- List of women's handballers with 1000 or more international goals
