= Nina Zulić =

Slovenian handball player (born 1995)

Personal information
- Nationality: Slovenian
- Born: 4 December 1995 (age 30) Ljubljana, Slovenia
- Height: 1.70 m (5 ft 7 in)

Sport
- Sport: Handball
- Position: Centre back
- Current club: RK Krim
- Number: 18

Senior clubs
- Years: Team
- –2017: Mlinotest Ajdovščina
- 2017–2020: RK Krim
- 2020–2021: Kastamonu Belediyesi
- 2021-2023: Gloria Bistrița
- 2023–: RK Krim
National team
Years	Team	Apps	(Gls)
–	Slovenia	81	(205)
Medal record
Mediterranean Games
Bronze medal – third place	2018 Tarragona	Team
- Updated on 11 November 2026

Nina Zulić (born 4 December 1995) is a Slovenian handball player for RK Krim and the Slovenian national team.

She participated at the 2016 European Women's Handball Championship.
