= Alja Varagić =

Slovenian handball player

Personal information
- Nationality: Slovenian
- Born: 11 December 1990 (age 35) Celje, SFR Yugoslavia
- Height: 1.85 m (6 ft 1 in)

Sport
- Sport: Handball
- Position: Right back
- Current club: RK Krim
- Number: 20

Senior clubs
- Years: Team
- –2009: ŽRK Celje
- 2009–2012: RK Krim
- 2012–2014: Érdi VSE
- 2014–: RK Krim
National team
Years	Team	Apps	(Gls)
–	Slovenia	41	(75)

Alja Varagić (born 11 December 1990 as Alja Koren) is a Slovenian handball player for RK Krim and the Slovenian national team.

== International honours ==
- EHF Cup Winners' Cup:
  - Semifinalist: 2016
