= 2019–20 Siófok KC season =

Siófok KC
2019–20 season
- Chairman: János Fodor
- Manager: (Norway) Tor Odvar Moen
Home colours	Away colours

The 2019–20 season will be Siófok KC's 11th competitive and consecutive season in the Nemzeti Bajnokság I.

== Players ==
=== Squad information ===
Goalkeepers

- 7 (Hungary) Melinda Szikora
- 12 (Norway) Silje Solberg
- 77 (Hungary) Kincső Csapó

Left Wingers

- 9 (Hungary) Júlia Hársfalvi
- 13 (France) Camille Aoustin
- 55 (Hungary) Kíra Wald

Right Wingers

- 8 (Denmark) Simone Böhme
- 23 (Hungary) Nelly Such

Line players

- 17 (Croatia) Katarina Ježić
- 20 (Poland) Joanna Drabik
- 66 (Hungary) Póczik Kata

Left Backs

- 11 (Norway) Kjerstin Boge Solås
- 32 (Croatia) Andrea Kobetić
- 44 (Hungary) Laura Lapos

Centre Backs

- 25 (Spain) Nerea Pena (c)
- 29 (France) Gnonsiane Niombla

Right Backs

- 21 (Hungary) Csilla Németh
- 33 (Hungary) Zsuzsanna Tomori
- 88 (Serbia) Anđela Janjušević

=== Transfers ===
Source: hetmeteres.hu

In:

- Kincső Csapó (from Dunaújváros)
- Júlia Hársfalvi (from Győri ETO)
- (France) Gnonsiane Niombla (from (France) Metz)
- (Spain) Nerea Pena (from Ferencváros)
- (Norway) Kjerstin Boge Solås (from (Norway) Tertnes)
- Melinda Szikora (from Ferencváros)
- Zsuzsanna Tomori (from Győri ETO)

Out:

- (Romania) Denisa Dedu (to (Romania) CSM București)
- Asma Elghaoui (to (Romania) SCM Râmnicu Vâlcea)
- (Romania) Melinda Geiger (retired)
- (Spain) Mireya González (to (Romania) SCM Râmnicu Vâlcea)
- (Russia) Tatyana Khmyrova (temporarily pauses his career)
- (France) Estelle Nze Minko (to Győri ETO)
- (Romania) Gabriela Perianu (to (Romania) CSM București)

== Club ==
=== Technical Staff ===
Position	Staff member
President	(Hungary) János Fodor
Technical manager	(Hungary) Mikós Bitter
Head coach	(Norway) Tor Odvar Moen
Assistant coaches	(Norway) Bent Dahl
Goalkeeping coach	(Hungary) Melinda Pastrovics
Team doctor	(Hungary) Dr. Attila Kisegyházi
Masseur	(Hungary) Tamás Bimbó
Conditioning coach	(Serbia) Slobodan Acimov
Rehabilitation coach	(Hungary) Réka Vaskó

Source: Coaches, Management

=== Uniform ===
- Supplier: hummel
- Main sponsor: tippmix / Peszter Kft. / Budapest Bank
- Back sponsor: PulaiQuontroll Kft. / VABEKO Kft.

== Competitions ==
=== Overview ===
Win Draw Loss

Competition	First match	Last match	Starting round	Final position	Record							
Competition	First match	Last match	Starting round	Final position	Pld	W	D	L	GF	GA	GD	Win %
Nemzeti Bajnokság I	31 August 2019	23 May 2020	Matchday 1	Matchday 26	14	11	1	2	470	338	+132	78.57
Magyar Kupa	2 January 2020	-	Fourth round	-	1	1	0	0	43	22	+21	100.00
EHF Cup	10 November 2019	-	Third qualifying round	-	4	2	2	0	130	109	+21	50.00
Total					19	14	3	2	643	469	+174	73.68

Last updated: 26 January 2020
Source: Competitions

=== Nemzeti Bajnokság I ===
==== Results by round ====
Match	1	2	3	4	5	6	7	8	9	10	11	12	13	14	15	16	17	18	19	20	21	22	23	24	25	26
Ground	A	H	H	H	A	A	A	H	A	H	A	H	A	H	H	A	A	H	A	H	A	H	A	H	A	H
Result	L	W	W	D	L	W	W	W	W	W	W	W	W	W	W	W	W	W								

Updated to match(es) played on 29 February 2020. Source: Matches
A = Away; H = Home; W = Win; D = Draw; L = Loss

==== Matches ====
Round 1; 1 September 2019; 16:30	Győri Audi ETO KC	27–24	Siófok KC	Audi Aréna, Győr; Attendance: 4,874; Referees: Bíró, Kiss
Round 1; 1 September 2019; 16:30	Hansen 6	(17–13)	Aoustin 7	Audi Aréna, Győr; Attendance: 4,874; Referees: Bíró, Kiss
Round 1; 1 September 2019; 16:30	1× (yellow card) 1× (suspension)	Report	1× (yellow card) 3× (suspension)	Audi Aréna, Győr; Attendance: 4,874; Referees: Bíró, Kiss

Round 2; 7 September 2019; 18:00	Siófok KC	40–21	Hungast-Szombathelyi KKA	Szilárd Kiss Sports Hall, Siófok; Attendance: 1,050; Referees: Marton, Szabó
Round 2; 7 September 2019; 18:00	Kobetić 8	(16–13)	Mitrović 5	Szilárd Kiss Sports Hall, Siófok; Attendance: 1,050; Referees: Marton, Szabó
Round 2; 7 September 2019; 18:00	1× (suspension)	Report	1× (yellow card) 3× (suspension)	Szilárd Kiss Sports Hall, Siófok; Attendance: 1,050; Referees: Marton, Szabó

Round 3; 11 September 2019; 18:00	Siófok KC	26–17	Kisvárda Master Good SE	Szilárd Kiss Sports Hall, Siófok; Attendance: 880; Referees: Őri, Pozdena
Round 3; 11 September 2019; 18:00	Aoustin, Niombla 6	(13–11)	Milosevic 5	Szilárd Kiss Sports Hall, Siófok; Attendance: 880; Referees: Őri, Pozdena
Round 3; 11 September 2019; 18:00	1× (yellow card) 3× (suspension)	Report	4× (suspension)	Szilárd Kiss Sports Hall, Siófok; Attendance: 880; Referees: Őri, Pozdena

Round 4; 21 September 2019; 17:00	Siófok KC	31–31	FTC-Rail Cargo Hungaria	Szilárd Kiss Sports Hall, Siófok; Attendance: 1,185; Referees: Horváth, Marton
Round 4; 21 September 2019; 17:00	Kobetić 9	(19–18)	Háfra 7	Szilárd Kiss Sports Hall, Siófok; Attendance: 1,185; Referees: Horváth, Marton
Round 4; 21 September 2019; 17:00	2× (yellow card) 1× (suspension) 2× (red card)	Report	2× (yellow card) 5× (suspension) 1× (red card)	Szilárd Kiss Sports Hall, Siófok; Attendance: 1,185; Referees: Horváth, Marton

Round 5; 10 October 2019; 18:00	Szent István SE	19–39	Siófok KC	Municipal Sports Hall, Monor; Attendance: 350; Referees: Földesi, Halász
Round 5; 10 October 2019; 18:00	Scheffer 4	(11–22)	three players 6	Municipal Sports Hall, Monor; Attendance: 350; Referees: Földesi, Halász
Round 5; 10 October 2019; 18:00	2× (yellow card) 2× (suspension)	Report	5× (suspension)	Municipal Sports Hall, Monor; Attendance: 350; Referees: Földesi, Halász

Round 6; 19 October 2019; 18:00	Siófok KC	40–15	Alba Fehérvár KC	Szilárd Kiss Sports Hall, Siófok; Attendance: 1,185; Referees: Rontó, Szanyi
Round 6; 19 October 2019; 18:00	Kobetić 7	(24–6)	Mendy 4	Szilárd Kiss Sports Hall, Siófok; Attendance: 1,185; Referees: Rontó, Szanyi
Round 6; 19 October 2019; 18:00	1× (yellow card) 2× (suspension)	Report	3× (yellow card) 3× (suspension)	Szilárd Kiss Sports Hall, Siófok; Attendance: 1,185; Referees: Rontó, Szanyi

Round 7; 26 October 2019; 18:00	Váci NKSE	27–31	Siófok KC	Municipal Sports Hall, Vác; Attendance: 520; Referees: Medve, Südi
Round 7; 26 October 2019; 18:00	Kácsor 4	(14–15)	Kobetić 7	Municipal Sports Hall, Vác; Attendance: 520; Referees: Medve, Südi
Round 7; 26 October 2019; 18:00	1× (yellow card) 3× (suspension)	Report	1× (yellow card) 5× (suspension)	Municipal Sports Hall, Vác; Attendance: 520; Referees: Medve, Südi

Round 8; 3 November 2019; 17:00	Siófok KC	34–17	EUbility Group-Békéscsaba	Szilárd Kiss Sports Hall, Siófok; Attendance: 1,045; Referees: Őri, Pozdena
Round 8; 3 November 2019; 17:00	Aoustin 7	(20–9)	Vukajlović 5	Szilárd Kiss Sports Hall, Siófok; Attendance: 1,045; Referees: Őri, Pozdena
Round 8; 3 November 2019; 17:00	2× (yellow card) 1× (suspension)	Report	1× (yellow card) 3× (suspension)	Szilárd Kiss Sports Hall, Siófok; Attendance: 1,045; Referees: Őri, Pozdena

Round 9; 5 October 2019; 14:30	Érd	27–21	Siófok KC	Érd Aréna, Érd; Attendance: 1,800; Referees: Bócz, Wiedemann
Round 9; 5 October 2019; 14:30	do Nascimento 7	(14–9)	Niombla 5	Érd Aréna, Érd; Attendance: 1,800; Referees: Bócz, Wiedemann
Round 9; 5 October 2019; 14:30	2× (yellow card) 2× (suspension) 1× (red card)	Report	2× (yellow card) 2× (suspension) 1× (red card)	Érd Aréna, Érd; Attendance: 1,800; Referees: Bócz, Wiedemann

Round 10; 6 February 2020; 18:00	Siófok KC	35–19	Dunaújvárosi Kohász KA	Szilárd Kiss Sports Hall, Siófok; Attendance: 1,100; Referees: Őri, Pozdena
Round 10; 6 February 2020; 18:00	Niombla 5	(18–10)	Szekerczés 8	Szilárd Kiss Sports Hall, Siófok; Attendance: 1,100; Referees: Őri, Pozdena
Round 10; 6 February 2020; 18:00	2× (yellow card) 1× (suspension)	Report	2× (yellow card) 5× (suspension)	Szilárd Kiss Sports Hall, Siófok; Attendance: 1,100; Referees: Őri, Pozdena

Round 11; 29 December 2019; 17:00	MTK Budapest	26–37	Siófok KC	Elektromos hall, Budapest; Attendance: 350; Referees: Marton, Szabó
Round 11; 29 December 2019; 17:00	Szőlősi-Zácsik 8	(12–20)	Pena 9	Elektromos hall, Budapest; Attendance: 350; Referees: Marton, Szabó
Round 11; 29 December 2019; 17:00	1× (yellow card) 4× (suspension)	Report	1× (yellow card) 4× (suspension)	Elektromos hall, Budapest; Attendance: 350; Referees: Marton, Szabó

Round 12; 8 January 2020; 18:00	Siófok KC	38–26	Motherson-Mosonmagyaróvár	Szilárd Kiss Sports Hall, Siófok; Attendance: 950; Referees: Fekete, Tóth
Round 12; 8 January 2020; 18:00	Ježić 8	(18–13)	Hudák 5	Szilárd Kiss Sports Hall, Siófok; Attendance: 950; Referees: Fekete, Tóth
Round 12; 8 January 2020; 18:00	2× (yellow card) 3× (suspension)	Report	3× (yellow card) 3× (suspension)	Szilárd Kiss Sports Hall, Siófok; Attendance: 950; Referees: Fekete, Tóth

Round 13; 15 January 2020; 18:00	DVSC Schaeffler	30–39	Siófok KC	Imre Hódos Sports Hall, Debrecen; Attendance: 1,400; Referees: Bócz, Wiedemann
Round 13; 15 January 2020; 18:00	Karsten 6	(14–18)	Drabik 6	Imre Hódos Sports Hall, Debrecen; Attendance: 1,400; Referees: Bócz, Wiedemann
Round 13; 15 January 2020; 18:00	2× (yellow card) 3× (suspension)	Report	1× (yellow card) 4× (suspension)	Imre Hódos Sports Hall, Debrecen; Attendance: 1,400; Referees: Bócz, Wiedemann

Round 14; 22 January 2020; 18:00	Siófok KC	34–29	Győri Audi ETO KC	Szilárd Kiss Sports Hall, Siófok; Attendance: 1,185; Referees: Hargitai, Markó
Round 14; 22 January 2020; 18:00	four players 5	(21–12)	Nze Minko 5	Szilárd Kiss Sports Hall, Siófok; Attendance: 1,185; Referees: Hargitai, Markó
Round 14; 22 January 2020; 18:00	2× (yellow card) 5× (suspension)	Report	2× (yellow card) 4× (suspension)	Szilárd Kiss Sports Hall, Siófok; Attendance: 1,185; Referees: Hargitai, Markó

Round 15; 13 October 2019; 18:00	Hungast-Szombathelyi KKA	26–36	Siófok KC	Répce Sports Hall, Répcelak; Attendance: 250; Referees: Hantos, Rózsahegyi
Round 15; 13 October 2019; 18:00	Varga 8	(14–19)	Kobetić 8	Répce Sports Hall, Répcelak; Attendance: 250; Referees: Hantos, Rózsahegyi
Round 15; 13 October 2019; 18:00	1× (yellow card) 5× (suspension)	Report	2× (yellow card) 2× (suspension)	Répce Sports Hall, Répcelak; Attendance: 250; Referees: Hantos, Rózsahegyi

Round 16; 14 February 2019; 18:00	Kisvárda Master Good SE	20–32	Siófok KC	Municipal Sports Hall, Kisvárda; Attendance: 980; Referees: Bujdosó, Horváth
Round 16; 14 February 2019; 18:00	Dombi 5	(8–16)	Kobetić 6	Municipal Sports Hall, Kisvárda; Attendance: 980; Referees: Bujdosó, Horváth
Round 16; 14 February 2019; 18:00	1× (yellow card) 4× (suspension)	Report	2× (yellow card) 3× (suspension)	Municipal Sports Hall, Kisvárda; Attendance: 980; Referees: Bujdosó, Horváth

Round 17; 18 February 2019; 18:00	FTC-Rail Cargo Hungaria	24–26	Siófok KC	Elek Gyula Aréna, Budapest; Attendance: 1,200; Referees: Horváth, Marton
Round 17; 18 February 2019; 18:00	Háfra 7	(14–16)	Kobetić 8	Elek Gyula Aréna, Budapest; Attendance: 1,200; Referees: Horváth, Marton
Round 17; 18 February 2019; 18:00	2× (yellow card) 2× (suspension)	Report	2× (yellow card) 4× (suspension) 1× (red card)	Elek Gyula Aréna, Budapest; Attendance: 1,200; Referees: Horváth, Marton

Round 18; 25 February 2020; 18:00	Siófok KC	45–26	Szent István SE	Szilárd Kiss Sports Hall, Siófok; Attendance: 900; Referees: Kovács-Sebők, Réti
Round 18; 25 February 2020; 18:00	Ježić 7	(25–13)	four players 3	Szilárd Kiss Sports Hall, Siófok; Attendance: 900; Referees: Kovács-Sebők, Réti
Round 18; 25 February 2020; 18:00	1× (suspension)	Report	1× (yellow card) 4× (suspension)	Szilárd Kiss Sports Hall, Siófok; Attendance: 900; Referees: Kovács-Sebők, Réti

==== Results overview ====
Opposition	Home score	Away score	Double
Alba Fehérvár KC	40–15	13 Mar	-
EUbility Group-Békéscsaba	34–17	11 Apr	-
DVSC Schaeffler	23 May	30–39	-
Dunaújvárosi Kohász KA	35–19	24 Apr	-
Érd	18 Apr	27–21	-
FTC-Rail Cargo Hungaria	31–31	24–26	57-55
Győri Audi ETO KC	34–29	27–24	58-56
Kisvárda Master Good SE	26–17	20–32	58-37
MTK Budapest	2 May	26–37	-
Motherson-Mosonmagyaróvár	38–26	20 May	-
Szent István SE	45–26	19–39	84-45
Hungast-Szombathelyi KKA	40–21	26–36	76-47
Váci NKSE	4 Apr	27–31	-

=== Matches ===
4th round 2 January 2020; 18:00	Szent István SE	22–43	Siófok KC	Kiss Szilárd Sports Hall, Siófok; Attendance: 819; Referees: Őri, Podzena
4th round 2 January 2020; 18:00	Aron 6	(10–24)	Pena 7	Kiss Szilárd Sports Hall, Siófok; Attendance: 819; Referees: Őri, Podzena
4th round 2 January 2020; 18:00	1× (yellow card) 4× (suspension)	Report	1× (yellow card) 4× (suspension)	Kiss Szilárd Sports Hall, Siófok; Attendance: 819; Referees: Őri, Podzena

5th round 15 April 2020; 18:15	Siófok KC	–	Győri Audi ETO KC	Kiss Szilárd Sports Hall, Siófok
5th round 15 April 2020; 18:15		(–)		Kiss Szilárd Sports Hall, Siófok
5th round 15 April 2020; 18:15		Report		Kiss Szilárd Sports Hall, Siófok

=== EHF Cup ===
==== Third qualifying round ====
10 November 2019; 18:00	Nantes Atlantique Handball (France)	24–32	Siófok KC	Palais des Sports de Beaulieu, Nantes; Attendance: 2,600; Referees: Freitas, Carvalho (POR)
10 November 2019; 18:00	Grigel 9	(12–16)	Niombla 6	Palais des Sports de Beaulieu, Nantes; Attendance: 2,600; Referees: Freitas, Carvalho (POR)
10 November 2019; 18:00	3× (yellow card) 5× (suspension)	Report	2× (yellow card) 3× (suspension)	Palais des Sports de Beaulieu, Nantes; Attendance: 2,600; Referees: Freitas, Carvalho (POR)

16 November 2019; 18:00	Siófok KC	29–34	(France) Nantes Atlantique Handball	Szilárd Kiss Sports Hall, Siófok; Attendance: 1,300; Referees: Christiansen, Hansen (DEN)
16 November 2019; 18:00	Kobetić, Pena 5	(15–13)	Grigel 7	Szilárd Kiss Sports Hall, Siófok; Attendance: 1,300; Referees: Christiansen, Hansen (DEN)
16 November 2019; 18:00	1× (yellow card) 1× (suspension)	Report	2× (yellow card) 4× (suspension)	Szilárd Kiss Sports Hall, Siófok; Attendance: 1,300; Referees: Christiansen, Hansen (DEN)

Siófok KC won, 61–58 on aggregate.

==== Group stage ====
Pos	Team	Pld	W	D	L	GF	GA	GD	Pts	Qualification	SIO	POD	KOB	MAG
1	(Hungary) Siófok KC	6	4	2	0	192	158	+34	10	Knockout stage	—	30–30	36–23	34–22
2	(Croatia) Podravka Vegeta	6	3	2	1	189	176	+13	8	Knockout stage	33–33	—	29–32	38–26
3	(Denmark) København Håndbold	6	3	0	3	174	171	+3	6		27–28	26–28	—	33–22
4	(Romania) CS Măgura Cisnădie	6	0	0	6	150	200	−50	0		23–31	29–31	28–33	—

Source: EHF
Rules for classification: Tiebreakers

===== Matches =====
5 January 2020; 17:00	Siófok KC	36–23	(Denmark) København Håndbold	Szilárd Kiss Sports Hall, Siófok; Attendance: 1,200; Referees: Ivanović, Vujisić (MNE)
5 January 2020; 17:00	Pena 11	(17–13)	Rej 7	Szilárd Kiss Sports Hall, Siófok; Attendance: 1,200; Referees: Ivanović, Vujisić (MNE)
5 January 2020; 17:00	1× (yellow card) 4× (suspension)	Report	1× (yellow card) 4× (suspension)	Szilárd Kiss Sports Hall, Siófok; Attendance: 1,200; Referees: Ivanović, Vujisić (MNE)

12 January 2020; 14:00 (15:00 EET)	CS Măgura Cisnădie (Romania)	23–31	Siófok KC	Polyvalent Hall Magura Cisnadie, Cisnădie; Attendance: 1,200; Referees: Sekulić, Jovandić (SRB)
12 January 2020; 14:00 (15:00 EET)	Moldovan 6	(9–17)	Böhme, Tomori 6	Polyvalent Hall Magura Cisnadie, Cisnădie; Attendance: 1,200; Referees: Sekulić, Jovandić (SRB)
12 January 2020; 14:00 (15:00 EET)	2× (yellow card) 3× (suspension)	Report	2× (yellow card) 4× (suspension)	Polyvalent Hall Magura Cisnadie, Cisnădie; Attendance: 1,200; Referees: Sekulić, Jovandić (SRB)

18 January 2020; 17:00	Siófok KC	30–30	(Croatia) Podravka Vegeta	Szilárd Kiss Sports Hall, Siófok; Attendance: 1,185; Referees: Novikov, Rozhkov (UKR)
18 January 2020; 17:00	Kobetić 6	(18–14)	four players 5	Szilárd Kiss Sports Hall, Siófok; Attendance: 1,185; Referees: Novikov, Rozhkov (UKR)
18 January 2020; 17:00	2× (yellow card) 2× (suspension)	Report	1× (yellow card) 3× (suspension)	Szilárd Kiss Sports Hall, Siófok; Attendance: 1,185; Referees: Novikov, Rozhkov (UKR)

26 January 2020; 15:30	Podravka Vegeta (Croatia)	33–33	Siófok KC	Gimnazija "Fran Galović", Koprivnica; Attendance: 2,000; Referees: Christidi, Papamattheou (GRE)
26 January 2020; 15:30	Stanko 7	(16–15)	Kobetić 12	Gimnazija "Fran Galović", Koprivnica; Attendance: 2,000; Referees: Christidi, Papamattheou (GRE)
26 January 2020; 15:30	3× (yellow card) 4× (suspension)	Report	2× (yellow card) 4× (suspension)	Gimnazija "Fran Galović", Koprivnica; Attendance: 2,000; Referees: Christidi, Papamattheou (GRE)

2 February 2020; 14:00	København Håndbold (Denmark)	27–28	Siófok KC	Frederiksberghallen, Frederiksberg; Attendance: 773; Referees: Rosendo, Estévez (ESP)
2 February 2020; 14:00	Bont 7	(15–15)	Kobetić 9	Frederiksberghallen, Frederiksberg; Attendance: 773; Referees: Rosendo, Estévez (ESP)
2 February 2020; 14:00	1× (yellow card) 4× (suspension)	Report	3× (yellow card) 1× (suspension)	Frederiksberghallen, Frederiksberg; Attendance: 773; Referees: Rosendo, Estévez (ESP)

9 February 2020; 15:00	Siófok KC	34–22	(Romania) CS Măgura Cisnădie	Szilárd Kiss Sports Hall, Siófok; Attendance: 1,200; Referees: Mertinian, Syrepisios (GRE)
9 February 2020; 15:00	three players 6	(12–15)	three players 4	Szilárd Kiss Sports Hall, Siófok; Attendance: 1,200; Referees: Mertinian, Syrepisios (GRE)
9 February 2020; 15:00	2× (yellow card) 1× (suspension)	Report	1× (yellow card) 4× (suspension)	Szilárd Kiss Sports Hall, Siófok; Attendance: 1,200; Referees: Mertinian, Syrepisios (GRE)

===== Results overview =====
Opposition	Home score	Away score	Double
(Croatia) Podravka Vegeta	30–30	33–33	66-66
(Romania) CS Măgura Cisnădie	34–22	23–31	65-45
(Denmark) København Håndbold	36–23	27–28	64-50

==== Knockout stage ====
===== Quarter-finals =====
29 February 2020; 14:00 (16:00 TRT)	Kastamonu GSK (Turkey)	29–38	Siófok KC	Atatürk Sports Hall, Kastamonu; Attendance: 1,500; Referees: Xhema, Jahja (KOS)
29 February 2020; 14:00 (16:00 TRT)	İskit 7	(12–24)	Aoustin 8	Atatürk Sports Hall, Kastamonu; Attendance: 1,500; Referees: Xhema, Jahja (KOS)
29 February 2020; 14:00 (16:00 TRT)	3× (suspension)	Report	1× (suspension)	Atatürk Sports Hall, Kastamonu; Attendance: 1,500; Referees: Xhema, Jahja (KOS)

7 March 2020; 15:00	Siófok KC	40–20	(Turkey) Kastamonu GSK	Szilárd Kiss Sports Hall, Siófok; Attendance: 1,185; Referees: Braseth, Sundet (NOR)
7 March 2020; 15:00	Hársfalvi, Ježić 6	(19–10)	İskenderoğlu, Özel 6	Szilárd Kiss Sports Hall, Siófok; Attendance: 1,185; Referees: Braseth, Sundet (NOR)
7 March 2020; 15:00	1× (yellow card) 2× (suspension)	Report	1× (yellow card) 5× (suspension)	Szilárd Kiss Sports Hall, Siófok; Attendance: 1,185; Referees: Braseth, Sundet (NOR)

== Statistics ==
=== Top scorers ===
Includes all competitive matches. The list is sorted by shirt number when total goals are equal.

Last updated on 8 March 2020

Position	Nation	No.	Name	Hungarian League	Hungarian Cup	EHF Cup	Total
1	(Croatia)	32	Andrea Kobetić	82	0	53	135
2	(Croatia)	17	Katarina Ježić	77	1	46	124
3	(France)	29	Gnonsiane Niombla	80	0	25	105
4	(France)	13	Camille Aoustin	62	0	41	103
5	(Denmark)	8	Simone Böhme	56	4	27	87
6	(Hungary)	23	Zsuzsanna Tomori	55	4	28	87
7	(Poland)	20	Joanna Drabik	49	2	18	69
8	(Hungary)	23	Nelly Such	39	6	21	66
9	(Spain)	25	Nerea Pena	27	7	31	65
10	(Hungary)	18	Júlia Hársfalvi	31	5	16	52
11	(Serbia)	88	Anđela Janjušević	25	4	16	45
12	(Hungary)	55	Kíra Wald	13	2	5	20
13	(Hungary)	44	Laura Lapos	6	4	2	12
14	(Hungary)	7	Melinda Szikora	3	0	2	5
15	(Hungary)	21	Csilla Mazák-Németh	1	4	0	5
16	(Norway)	12	Silje Solberg	1	0	0	1
17	(Hungary)	77	Kincső Csapó	1	0	0	1
			TOTALS	608	43	331	982

=== Attendances ===
List of the home matches:

Round	Against	Attadance	Capatility	Date
NB I- 2.	Szombathelyi KKA	1,050	75,0%	September 7, 2019
NB I- 3.	Kisvárda Master Good SE	880	62,9%	September 11, 2019
NB I- 4.	FTC-Rail Cargo Hungaria	1,185	84,6%	September 21, 2019
NB I- 6.	Alba Fehérvár KC	1,185	84,6%	October 19, 2019
NB I- 8.	EUbility Group-Békéscsaba	1,045	74,6%	November 3, 2019
EHF-QR3	Nantes Atlantique Handball (France)	1,300	92,9%	November 16, 2019
MK- 4th	Szent István SE	819	58,5%	January 2, 2020
EHF-(GS) 1.	København Håndbold (Denmark)	1,200	85,7%	January 5, 2020
NB I- 12.	Motherson-Mosonmagyaróvár	950	67,9%	January 8, 2020
EHF-(GS) 3.	Podravka Vegeta (Croatia)	1,185	84,6%	January 18, 2020
NB I- 14.	Győri Audi ETO KC	1,185	84,6%	January 22, 2020
NB I- 10.	Dunaújvárosi Kohász KA	1,100	78,6%	February 6, 2020
EHF-(GS) 6.	CS Măgura Cisnădie (Romania)	1,200	85,7%	February 9, 2020
NB I- 18.	Szent István SE	900	64,3%	February 25, 2020
EHF- QF	Kastamonu GSK (Turkey)	1,185	84,6%	March 7, 2020
NB I- 20.	Váci NKSE		%	April 4, 2020
MK- 5th	Győri Audi ETO KC		%	April 8, 2020
