= List of Hungarian women's handball transfers summer 2011 =

This is a list of the Hungarian women's handball transfers for the 2011 summer transfer window. Only transfers that feature at least one Nemzeti Bajnokság I club and that were completed after the end of the winter 2010–11 transfer window and before the end of the 2011 summer window are listed.

== Transfers by team ==
=== Alcoa FKC RightPhone ===
In

- (Croatia) Ana Maruščec (from ŽRK Zamet Rijeka)
- (Montenegro) Sandra Nikčević (from RK Podravka Koprivnica)
- (Croatia) Ana Nikšić (on loan from RK Lokomotiva Zagreb)
- (Hungary) Virág Vaszari (from Váci NKSE)

Out

- (Hungary) Fruzsina Azari (to Veszprém Barabás KC)
- (Hungary) Nóra Csákovics (to Kiskunhalas NKSE)
- (Hungary) Nóra Dancs (to Kispesti NKK)
- (Hungary) Ivett Kaszás (retired)
- (Ukraine) Olha Vashchuk (to Rostov-Don)
- (Hungary) Melinda Vincze (to ÉTV-Érdi VSE)

=== Budapest Bank-Békéscsabai Előre NKSE ===
In

- (Hungary) Gyöngyi Drávai (from Győri Audi ETO KC)
- (Bosnia and Herzegovina) Ivana Ljubas (from RK Zagorje)
- (Hungary) Flóra Sipeki (from Váci NKSE)
- (Hungary) Tímea Szögi (back from maternity leave)
- (Hungary) Szilvia Tarjányi (from Veszprém Barabás KC)
- (Montenegro) Jasna Tošković (from ŽRK Naisa Niš)

Out

- (Hungary) Bernadett Bódi (to Siófok KC-Galerius Fürdő)
- (Hungary) Anita Cifra (to FTC-Rail Cargo Hungaria)
- (Hungary) Kitti Kudor (to DVSC-Fórum)
- (Hungary) Emese Mózes-Rácz (on maternity leave)
- (Ukraine) Olha Nikolayenko (to CJF Fleury Loiret HB)
- (Hungary) Klára Szekeres (to ÉTV-Érdi VSE)

=== Dunaújvárosi NKS ===
In

- (Hungary) Renáta Gerstmár (from Veszprém Barabás KC)
- (Hungary) Boglárka Hosszu (from Siófok KC-Galerius Fürdő)
- (Hungary) Szilvia Lázár (from Tecton WAT Atzgersdorf)
- (Hungary) Vivien Víg (on loan from Győri Audi ETO KC)

Out

- (Hungary) Beatrix Balogh (to Marcali VSZSE)
- (Hungary) Anna Felső (to Kecskeméti NKSE)
- (Hungary) Ivett Nagy (to Veszprém Barabás KC)'
- (Hungary) Ágnes Győri (Marcali VSZSE)
- (Hungary) Bojana Radulovics (retired)
- (Hungary) Sarolta Selmeczi (to Veszprém Barabás KC)
- (Hungary) Viktória Velky (to Szeged KKSE)

=== DVSC-Fórum ===
In

- (Hungary) Annamária Király (from Veszprém Barabás KC)
- (Hungary) Mercédesz Karnik (from Hajdúnánás Termál SC)
- (Hungary) Kitti Kudor (from Budapest Bank-Békéscsabai Előre NKSE)
- (Hungary) Vivien Léránt (on loan from Hypo Niederösterreich)
- (Hungary) Gabriella Szűcs (from CS Oltchim Râmnicu Vâlcea)

Out

- (Hungary) Annamária Bogdanovics (to Siófok KC-Galerius Fürdő)
- (Hungary) Barbara Bognár (to ÉTV-Érdi VSE)
- (Hungary) Rita Borbás (to UKSE Szekszárd)
- (Hungary) Anita Bulath (to Veszprém Barabás KC)
- (Hungary) Dóra Dublinszki (to Veszprém Barabás KC)
- (Hungary) Gabriella Juhász (to Veszprém Barabás KC)
- (Hungary) Éva Kiss (to Veszprém Barabás KC)
- (Hungary) Renáta Mörtel (to Siófok KC-Galerius Fürdő)
- (Hungary) Viktória Pácz (to Angoulême Charente HB)
- (Hungary) Valéria Szabó (to Zvezda Zvenigorod)

=== ÉTV-Érdi VSE ===
In

- (Hungary) Barbara Bognár (from DVSC-Fórum)
- (Iceland) Anna Úrsúla Guðmundsdóttir (from Valur Reykjavík)
- (Hungary) Klára Szekeres (from Békéscsabai Előre NKSE)
- (Hungary) Melinda Vincze (from Alcoa FKC RightPhone)
- (Montenegro) Sara Vukčević (on loan from ŽRK Budućnost Podgorica)

Out

- (Hungary) Edina Burai (to UKSE Szekszárd)
- (Hungary) Judit Ferencz (to Budaörs-Érdi VSE II)
- (Hungary) Krisztina Gyetván (to Váci NKSE)
- (Iceland) Anna Úrsúla Guðmundsdóttir (terminated contract)
- (Hungary) Ildikó Megyes (to Budaörs-Érdi VSE II)
- (Hungary) Helga Németh (retired)
- (Hungary) Cecília Őri (to Budaörs-Érdi VSE II)
- (Hungary) Réka Schneck (to Budaörs-Érdi VSE II)

=== FTC-Rail Cargo Hungaria ===
In

- (Hungary) Anita Cifra (from Budapest Bank-Békéscsabai Előre NKSE)
- (Serbia) Jelena Živković (from RK Zaječar)

Out

- (Hungary) Helga Albert (to Kispesti NKK)
- (Hungary) Brigitta Andrási (on loan to Kispesti NKK)
- (Hungary) Barbara Balogh (to TuS Metzingen)
- (Hungary) Regina Bari-Nagy (to TuS Metzingen)
- (Hungary) Maja Mayer (to Veszprém Barabás KC)
- (Hungary) Mária Mohácsik (on loan to Kispesti NKK)
- (Hungary) Csilla Németh (to Siófok KC-Galerius Fürdő)
- (Hungary) Anikó Szamoránsky (to Kiskunhalas NKSE)
- (Hungary) Noémi Trufán (to VfL Wolfsburg)

=== Győri Audi ETO KC ===
In

- (Serbia) Andrea Lekić (from RK Krim Ljubljana)
- (Norway) Heidi Løke (from Larvik HK)
- (Montenegro) Jovanka Radičević (from ŽRK Budućnost Podgorica)

Out

- (Romania) Aurelia Brădeanu (to CS Oltchim Râmnicu Vâlcea)
- (Hungary) Gyöngyi Drávai (to Budapest Bank-Békéscsabai Előre NKSE)
- (Hungary) Szabina Mayer (to Veszprém Barabás KC)
- (Slovakia) Katarína Mravíková (retired)
- (Hungary) Viktória Oguntoye (on loan to ÉTV-Érdi VSE)
- (Austria) Simona Spiridon (to Zvezda Zvenigorod)
- (Hungary) Patricia Szölösi
- (Hungary) Vivien Víg (on loan to Dunaújvárosi NKS)

=== Kiskunhalas NKSE ===
In

- (Hungary) Nóra Csákovics (from Alcoa FKC RightPhone)
- (Hungary) Viktória Fehér (from Szentendrei NKE)
- (Hungary) Adél Kosik (from CB Salud Tenerife)
- (Hungary) Andrea Scholtz (from Siófok KC-Galerius Fürdő)
- (Hungary) Andrea Sterbik (from Veszprém Barabás KC)
- (Hungary) Anikó Szamoránsky (from FTC-Rail Cargo Hungaria}

Out

- (Hungary) Kinga Domokos (to Orosházi NKC)
- (Hungary) Anna Kapási
- (Hungary) Dóra Karsai (retired)
- (Hungary) Orsolya Kiss
- (Hungary) Erika Virág (retired)

=== Siófok KC-Galerius Fürdő ===
In

- (Hungary) Szilvia Ábrahám (from Veszprém Barabás KC)
- (Hungary) Bernadett Bódi (from Budapest Bank-Békéscsabai Előre NKSE)
- (Hungary) Annamária Bogdanovics (from DVSC-Fórum)
- (Hungary) Orsolya Herr (from Váci NKSE)
- (Hungary) Renáta Mörtel (from DVSC-Fórum)'
- (Hungary) Csilla Németh (from FTC-Rail Cargo Hungaria)

Out

- (Brazil) Jacqueline Anastácio (to Gjøvik HK)
- (Hungary) Adrienn Bognár (to Aalborg DH)
- (Hungary) Zsanett Hanczvikkel (to Veszprém Barabás KC)
- (Hungary) Boglárka Hosszu (to Dunaújvárosi NKS)
- (Hungary) Regina Hrankai (to Veszprém Barabás KC)
- (Brazil) Silvia Pinheiro (to Hypo Niederösterreich)
- (Hungary) Andrea Scholtz (to Kiskunhalas NKSE)
- (Hungary) Zsuzsanna Tóth (to Budaörs-Érdi VSE II)

=== UKSE Szekszárd ===
In

- (Hungary) Rita Borbás (from DVSC-Fórum)
- (Hungary) Edina Burai (from ÉTV-Érdi VSE)

Out

- (Hungary) Ibolya Beck
- (Hungary) Zsuzsanna Hegyi (to SG BBM Bietigheim)
- (Hungary) Petra Horváth (to Mohácsi TE)
- (Hungary) Szimonetta Horváth (retired)
- (Hungary) Orsolya Jankovics
- (Hungary) Nóra Kovács (to HF Kroppskultur Dam)
- (Hungary) Dorina Mizsák (to Mohácsi TE)
- (Hungary) Virág Rózsa Samu (to Veszprém Barabás KC)
- (Hungary) Edina Szabó (to Kispesti NKK)

=== Váci NKSE ===
In

- (Hungary) Krisztina Gyetván (from ÉTV-Érdi VSE)'
- (Slovakia) Katarina Miklosová (from Kispesti NKK)
- (Hungary) Orsolya Szegedi (from VKLSE Győr)

Out

- (Hungary) Orsolya Herr (to Siófok KC-Galerius Fürdő)
- (Hungary) Erika Kirsner (retired)
- (Hungary) Lilla Németh (to Hypo Niederösterreich)
- (Hungary) Nikolett Pomozi
- (Hungary) Viktória Rédei Soós (to Hypo Niederösterreich)
- (Hungary) Flóra Sipeki (to Budapest Bank-Békéscsabai Előre NKSE)
- (Hungary) Bernadett Temes (to Hypo Niederösterreich)
- (Hungary) Virág Vaszari (to Alcoa FKC RightPhone)

=== Veszprém Barabás KC ===
In

- (Hungary) Fruzsina Azari (from Alcoa FKC RightPhone)
- (Hungary) Anita Bulath (from DVSC-Fórum)
- (Hungary) Dóra Dublinszki (from DVSC-Fórum)
- (Hungary) Zsanett Hanczvikkel (from Siófok KC-Galerius Fürdő)
- (Hungary) Réka Herceg (from Kecskeméti NKSE)
- (Hungary) Regina Hrankai (from Siófok KC-Galerius Fürdő)
- (Hungary) Gabriella Juhász (from DVSC-Fórum)
- (Hungary) Éva Kiss (from DVSC-Fórum)
- (Hungary) Maja Mayer (from FTC-Rail Cargo Hungaria)
- (Hungary) Szabina Mayer (from Győri Audi ETO KC)
- (Hungary) Ivett Nagy (from Dunaújvárosi NKS)
- (Hungary) Rózsa Virág Samu (from UKSE Szekszárd)
- (Hungary) Sarolta Selmeczi (from Dunaújvárosi NKS)

Out

- (Hungary) Szilvia Ábrahám (to Siófok KC-Galerius Fürdő)
- (Hungary) Renáta Gerstmár (to Dunaújvárosi NKS)
- (Hungary) Kitti Hoffmann (to Kispesti NKK)
- (Hungary) Annamária Király (to DVSC-Fórum)
- (Hungary) Viktória Koroknai
- (Hungary) Katalin Koszorús (retired)
- (Hungary) Ibolya Mehlmann (to RK Krim Ljubljana)
- (Hungary) Andrea Sterbik (to Kiskunhalas NKSE)
- (Hungary) Szilvia Tarjányi (to Budapest Bank-Békéscsabai Előre NKSE)
- (Hungary) Judit Veszeli (retired)
