= 2016 Carpathian Trophy =

Tournament details
- Host country: Romania
- Venue: 1 (in 1 host city)
- Dates: 26–27 November
- Teams: 4 (from 1 confederation)

Final positions
- Champions: Hungary (1st title)
- Runners-up: Romania
- Third place: Netherlands
- Fourth place: Romania B

Tournament statistics
- Matches played: 4
- Goals scored: 223 (55.75 per match)
- Top scorer(s): (Hungary) Anita Görbicz (13 goals)

Awards
- Best player: (Hungary) Kinga Klivinyi

The 2016 Carpathian Trophy was the 48th edition of the Carpathian Trophy held in Cluj-Napoca, Romania between 26–27 November as a women's friendly handball tournament organised by the Romanian Handball Federation.

The most recent silver and bronze medalists of the World Championship (Netherlands and Romania) appeared in the competition. Veteran Aurelia Brădeanu announced her retirement from national team after the tournament.

== Participants ==
- Romania (hosts)
- Romania B
- Hungary
- Netherlands

== Knockout stage (place 1-4) ==
=== Bracket ===
==== Semifinals ====
26 November 2016; 17:00	Hungary	30–26	Netherlands	Sala Polivalentă, Cluj-Napoca; Referees: Brunovský, Čanda (SVK)
26 November 2016; 17:00	Kovács, Szucsánszki 6	(12–13)	Hage, Schoenaker 5	Sala Polivalentă, Cluj-Napoca; Referees: Brunovský, Čanda (SVK)

26 November 2016; 20:00	Romania	31–23	Romania B	Sala Polivalentă, Cluj-Napoca; Referees: Florescu, Stoia (ROU)
26 November 2016; 20:00	Buceschi, Chiper, Chiricuță 4	(14–13)	Bazaliu, Tiron 5	Sala Polivalentă, Cluj-Napoca; Referees: Florescu, Stoia (ROU)

==== Third place game ====
27 November 2016
17:00
Netherlands
31–29 (ET)
Romania B
Sala Polivalentă, Cluj-Napoca
Referees: Florescu, Stoia (ROU)
Hage 6
(12–14)
Bazaliu, Tiron 6

FT: 26–26 ET: 5–3

==== Final ====
27 November 2016; 20:00	Hungary	29–24	Romania	Sala Polivalentă, Cluj-Napoca; Attendance: 5,000; Referees: Brunovský, Čanda (SVK)
27 November 2016; 20:00	Klivinyi 10	(14–12)	Buceschi, Geiger, Zamfir 5	Sala Polivalentă, Cluj-Napoca; Attendance: 5,000; Referees: Brunovský, Čanda (SVK)
27 November 2016; 20:00		Report		Sala Polivalentă, Cluj-Napoca; Attendance: 5,000; Referees: Brunovský, Čanda (SVK)

== Statistics ==
2016 Carpathian Trophy Champions

Hungary
First title

Team roster: Éva Kiss, Ildikó Erdősi, Zita Szucsánszki, Anett Kisfaludy, Anikó Kovacsics, Klára Szekeres, Anita Görbicz, Kinga Klivinyi, Krisztina Triscsuk, Bernadett Bódi, Dóra Hornyák, Luca Dombi, Nadine Schatzl, Viktória Lukács, Anna Kovács, Kinga Janurik, Melinda Szikora, Rea Mészáros.
Head coach: Kim Rasmussen.

=== Final ranking ===
Gold medal	Hungary
Silver medal	Romania
Bronze medal	Netherlands
4	Romania B

=== Awards ===
- Top Scorer: Anita Görbicz (HUN)
- Most Valuable Player: Kinga Klivinyi (HUN)
- Best Goalkeeper: Denisa Dedu (ROU)
