= Szamoránsky =

Szamoránsky is a Hungarian surname with Slovak origins. Notable people with the surname include:

- Anikó Szamoránsky (born 1986), Hungarian handball player
- Piroska Szamoránsky (born 1986), Hungarian handball player, twin sister of Anikó
