= Szilvia Ábrahám =

Hungarian handball player (born 1983)

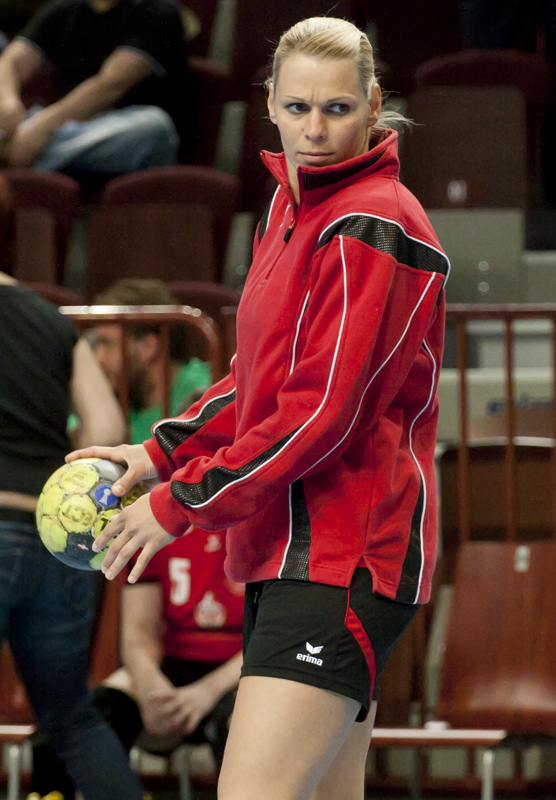

Personal information
- Full name: Szilvia Ábrahám
- Nationality: Hungarian
- Born: 1 August 1983 (age 43) Budapest, Hungary
- Height: 1.75 m (5 ft 9 in)

Sport
- Sport: Handball
- Position: Line Player
- Current club: Retired

Youth career
- Years: Team
- 1996–2000: Ferencvárosi TC

Senior clubs
- Years: Team
- 2000–2002: Budapesti Spartacus SC
- 2001–2002: → Jászberényi TKF DSE (loan)
- 2002–2007: Vasas SC
- 2007–2009: Váci NKSE
- 2009–2011: Veszprém Barabás KC
- 2011–2012: Siófok KC
- 2012–2013: Pilisvörösvári KSK
- 2013–2014: DVSC
- 2014–2015: MTK Budapest
National team
Years	Team	Apps	(Gls)
2010	Hungary	8	(3)
- Updated on 16 July 2018

Szilvia Ábrahám (born 1 August 1983 in Budapest) is a retired Hungarian handballer who played for the Hungarian national team.

== Career ==
Ábrahám had swum competitively for years, when at the age of 12 her form master and later her coach, Tibor Radványi invited her for a training of Ferencvárosi TC. She fell in love with handball immediately, but at first she found it very hard to quit swimming completely and practiced both sports parallelly for a year, before deciding to concentrate fully on handball.

For the age of 13 she was already a signed player of Ferencváros, with them she spent four seasons, playing in the youth team. She moved to Budapesti Spartacus SC in 2000 and made her debut in the Hungarian top flight yet in that year. In 2002 Vasas SC offered her a contract she could not refuse and Ábrahám joined the Hungarian record champions. She stayed five years by the red and blues, where she worked together among others with legendary Hungarian handball coach Lajos Mocsai.

Ábrahám left the financially struggling Vasas in 2007 and switched to Váci NKSE on a two-year deal. In Vác she got significantly more playing minutes than by any former teams and as a result, she quickly developed into one of the most effective line players in the league. In the summer of 2009 she was close to reach an agreement over the extension of her contract, but when it was made clear that Lucia Uhráková is joining the club and therefore Ábrahám may lose her first team place, she rather chose newcomers Veszprém Barabás KC and the regular playing time.

Her decision was proved to be right, as she scored a career record 128 league goals in the following season and also received her first senior international call-up from Eszter Mátéfi in September 2010, in preparation for the GF World Cup. She made it to the traveling squad and debuted in the Hungarian national team on 21 September 2010 against Germany. Three months later, she was selected into the national team for the European Championship as well, however, this spell was cut short as she was replaced by Tímea Tóth after the preliminary round, to widen the options on back positions.

The performances shown by Ábrahám have impressed Siófok KC, that secured her services for two years, starting from 1 July 2011. The deal was announced on 5 May 2011, when the ambitious club revealed that they signed Ábrahám along with other two Hungarian internationals, Bernadett Bódi and Renáta Mörtel.

In June 2015 she announced her retirement from professional handball. Between 2015 and 2017 she played for a Hungarian second division team, Pilisvörösvári KSK. Between 2018 and 2024 she played for Esztergomi Vitézek RAFC in the Hungarian third, later the second division. She was part of the team that managed to qualify for the top division.
