= Hawa N'Diaye =

Senegalese handball player (born 1995)

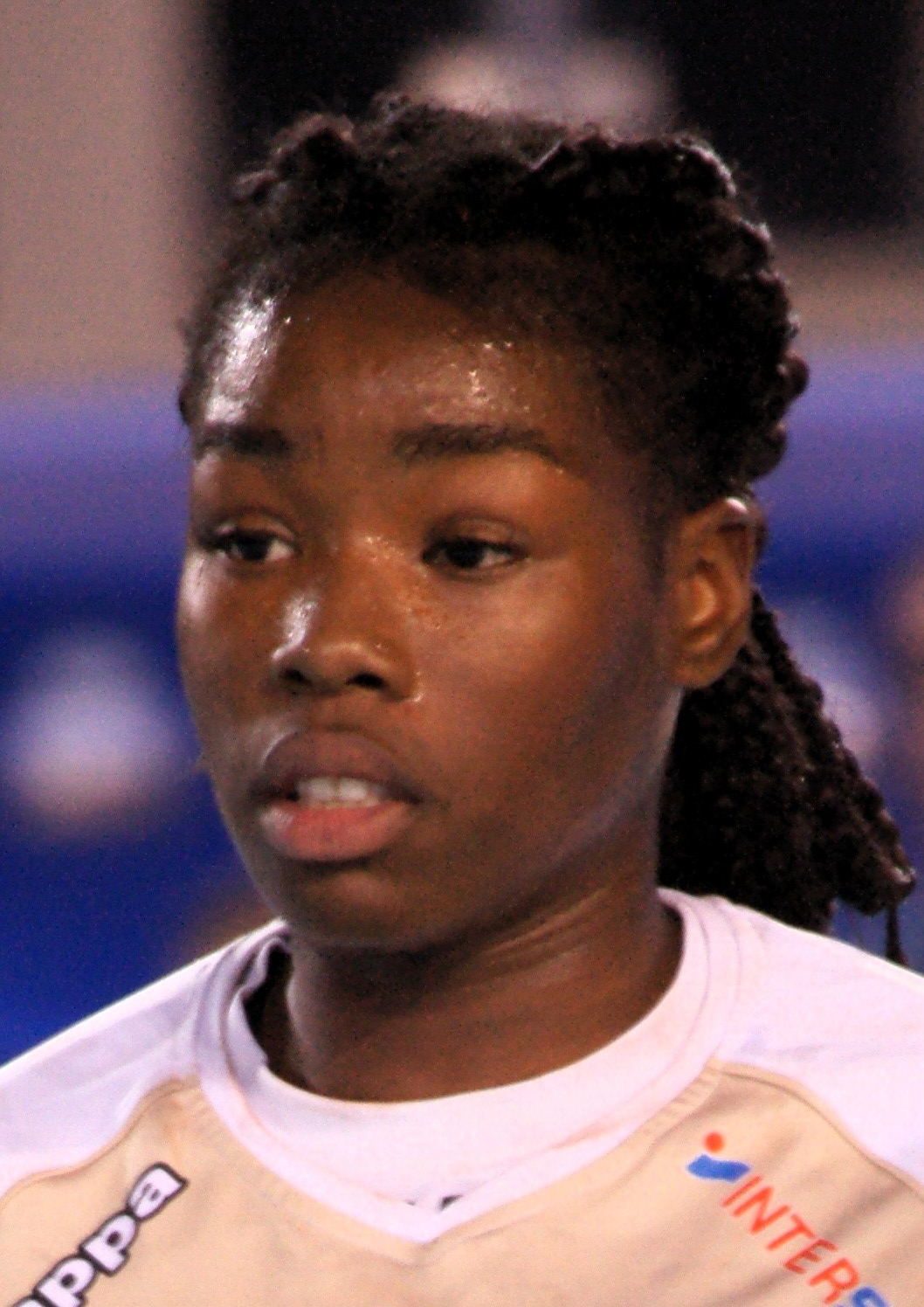
- Hawa N'Diaye, in 2017

Personal information
- Nationality: Senegalese
- Born: 24 July 1995 (age 31) Strasbourg, France
- Height: 1.76 m (5 ft 9 in)

Sport
- Sport: Handball
- Position: Pivot
- Current club: ZRK Buducnost

Senior clubs
- Years: Team
- 2013–2014: Le Havre AC
- 2014–2017: Metz Handball
- 2017–2019: Chambray Touraine Handball
- 2019–2022: Toulon Saint-Cyr Var Handball
- 2022–2023: Siófok KC
- 2023: SCM Gloria Buzău
- 2024: Brest Bretagne Handball
- 2024–2025: RK Krim
- 2025–: ŽRK Budućnost Podgorica
National team
Years	Team	Apps	(Gls)
–	Senegal	28	(91)
- Updated on 29 November 2025

Hawa N'Diaye (born 24 July 1995) is a Senegalese handball player who plays for ZRK Buducnost and the Senegal national team.

She competed at the 2019 World Women's Handball Championship in Japan at the 2025 World Women's Handball Championship in Germany.
