= Kinga Klivinyi =

Hungarian handball player (born 1992)

Kinga Debreczeni-Klivinyi
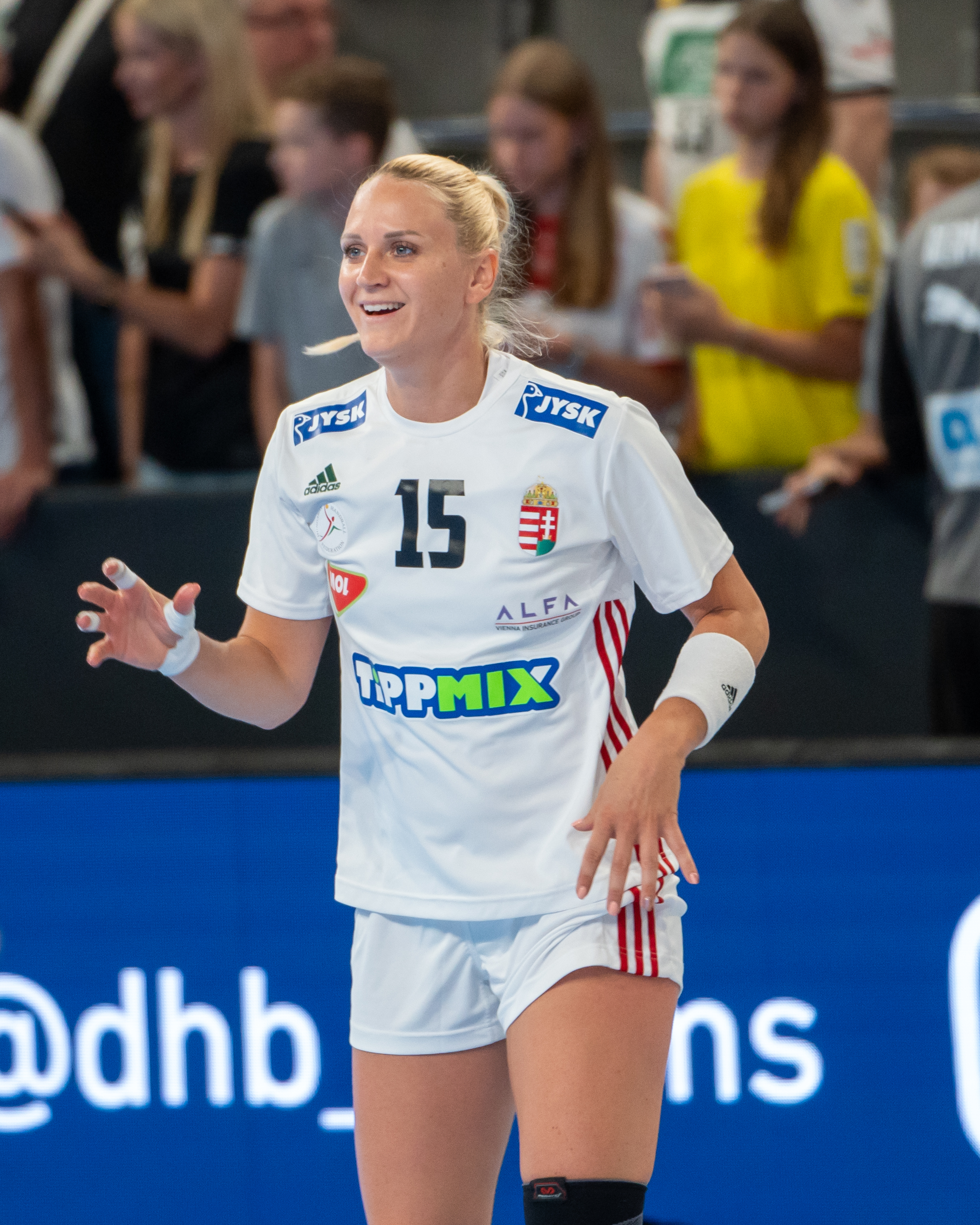
- 2024

Personal information
- Nationality: Hungarian
- Born: 31 March 1992 (age 34) Budapest, Hungary
- Height: 1.78 m (5 ft 10 in)

Sport
- Sport: Handball
- Position: Left back
- Current club: Moyra-Budaörs Handball
- Number: 15

Senior clubs
- Years: Team
- 2007–2009: Vasas SC
- 2009–2013: Váci NKSE
- 2009–2010: → Vasas SC (loan)
- 2010–2011: → Szentendrei NKE (loan)
- 2013–2018: Érd NK
- 2018–2020: Ferencvárosi TC
- 2020: Dunaújvárosi Kohász KA
- 2021–2023: Siófok KC
- 2023–: Moyra-Budaörs Handball
National team
| Years | Team | Apps | (Gls) |
| 2012– | Hungary | 96 | (195) |
Medal record
European Championship
| Bronze medal – third place | 2012 Serbia |
- Updated on 19 July 2025

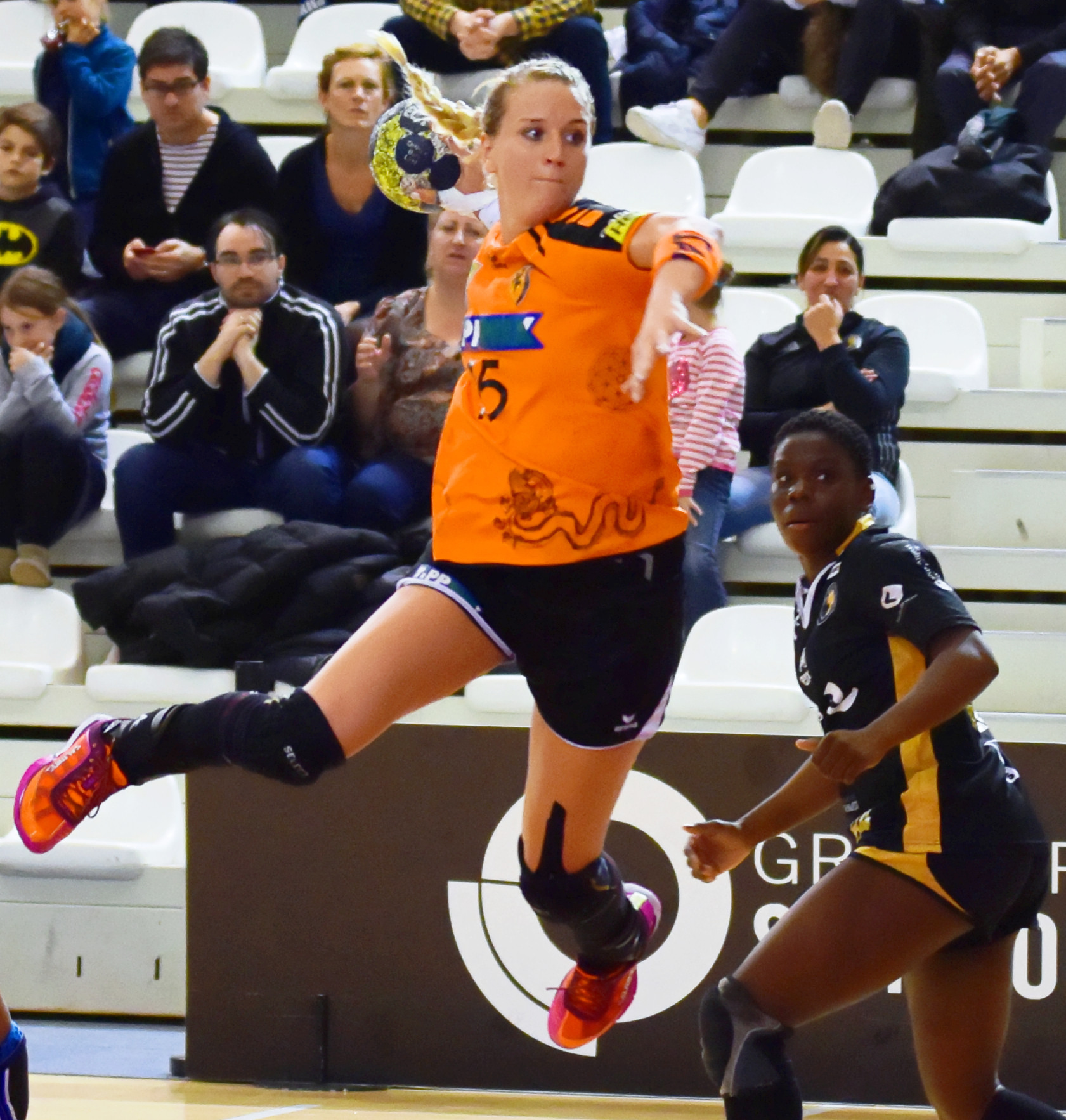
Nov. 18, 2017.

Kinga Debreczeni-Klivinyi (born 31 March 1992) is a Hungarian handballer for Moyra-Budaörs Handball and the Hungary national team.

== Career ==
She was capped for Hungary in various age categories and finished second on the top scorers' list of the 2009 European Women's U-17 Handball Championship with 55 goals. A year later, on the European Open Championship in Sweden, Klivinyi clinched the sixth place with the national team and was voted into the all-star team as the best playmaker of the tournament. In appreciation of her outstanding performances in 2010, she won the Heraklész Award, a sports prize given to the individuals in the younger age groups, who represented Hungary in their sports the most successfully. Thanks to her performances in 2011 she took the award in the following year again. In 2011, she was also chosen the best junior handballer of the country.

In 2012, she competed at the 2012 Women's Junior World Handball Championship in the Czech Republic.

== Achievements ==
- Nemzeti Bajnokság I:
  - Finalist: 2019
  - Bronze Medalist: 2010, 2014, 2015, 2016, 2017, 2018
- Magyar Kupa:
  - Finalist: 2016, 2018, 2019
- European Championship:
  - Bronze Medalist: 2012

== Awards and recognition ==
- All-Star Playmaker of the European Open Championship: 2010
- Heraklész Award: 2010, 2011
- Hungarian Junior Handballer of the Year: 2011
- Best Player of the Carpathian Trophy: 2016

== Personal life ==
She is married to fellow handball player, Dávid Debreczeni. They have two daughters together, born in 2023 and 2025.
