= Denisa Dedu =

Romanian handball player (born 1994)

Denisa Șandru
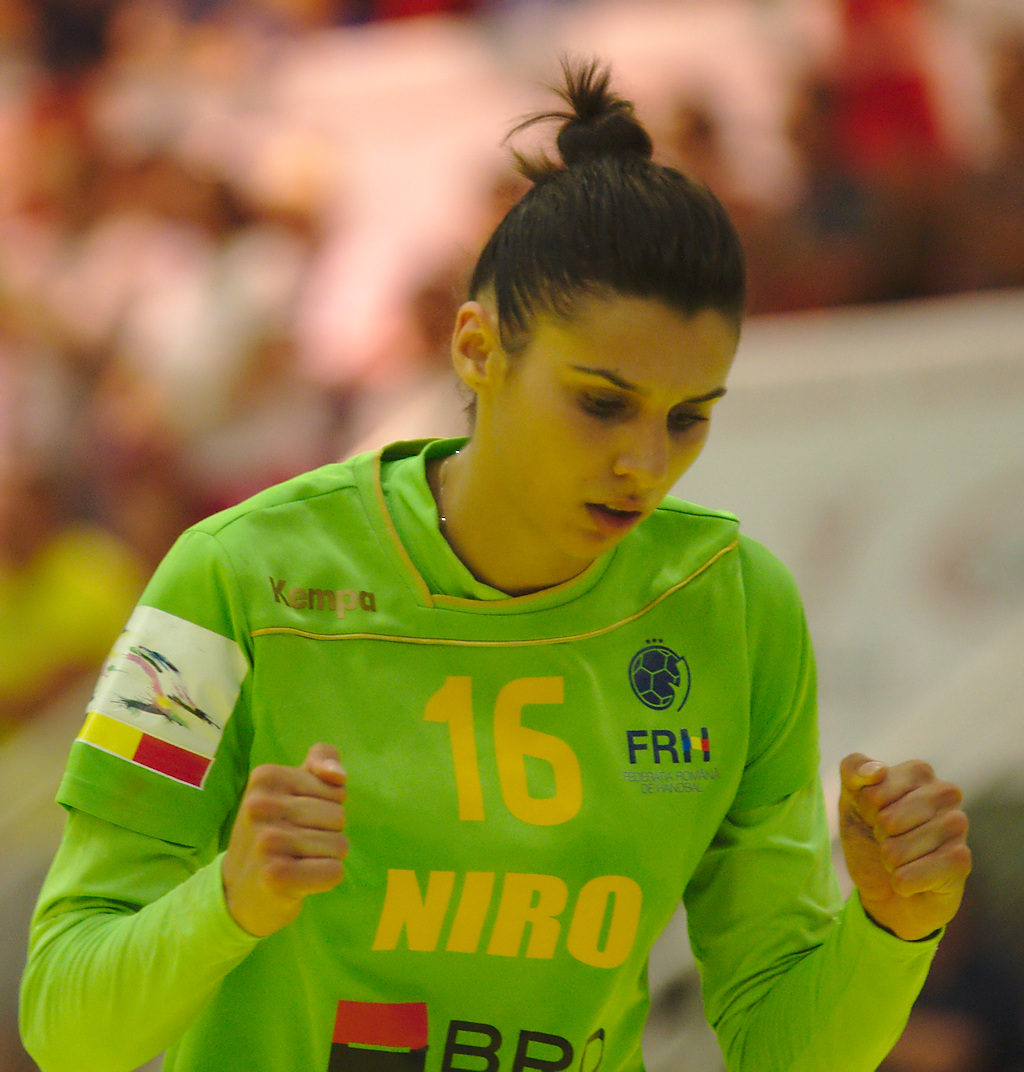
- Dedu in 2017

Personal information
- Full name: Denisa Ștefania Șandru
- Nationality: Romanian
- Born: 27 September 1994 (age 32) Brașov, Romania
- Height: 1.82 m (6 ft 0 in)

Sport
- Sport: Handball
- Position: Goalkeeper
- Current club: Rapid București
- Number: 16

Youth career
- Years: Team
- –: CSȘ Dinamo Brașov

Senior clubs
- Years: Team
- 2010–2017: ASC Corona Brașov
- 2017–2019: Siófok KC
- 2019–2021: CSM București
- 2021–2026: Rapid București
- 2026–: CSM București
National team
Years	Team	Apps	(Gls)
2010–	Romania	64	(4)
Medal record
World University Championship
Silver medal – second place	2016 Spain

Denisa Ștefania Șandru (née Dedu; born 27 September 1994) is a Romanian handballer for Rapid București and the Romanian national team.

== International honours ==
- EHF Cup:
  - Winner: 2019
  - Third place: 2016
- World University Championship:
  - Silver Medalist: 2016

== Individual awards ==
- Liga Națională Best Romanian Player: 2019
- Carpathian Trophy Best Goalkeeper: 2016
