= Orsolya Szegedi =

Hungarian handball player (born 1989)

Personal information
- Full name: Orsolya Szegedi
- Nationality: Hungarian
- Born: 16 February 1989 (age 37) Kiskunhalas, Hungary
- Height: 1.73 m (5 ft 8 in)

Sport
- Sport: Handball
- Position: Left Wing
- Current club: Retired

Senior clubs
- Years: Team
- 2006–2010: Győri ETO KC
- loan: → Alcoa FKC
- 2011: VKLSE Győr
- 2011–2014: Váci NKSE

Orsolya Szegedi (born 16 February 1989 in Kiskunhalas) is a former Hungarian handballer.

== Achievements ==
- Nemzeti Bajnokság I:
  - Winner: 2008, 2010
- Magyar Kupa:
  - Winner: 2007, 2008, 2010
- EHF Champions League:
  - Semifinalist: 2007, 2008, 2010

== Personal life ==
She is in relationship with handball coach Csaba Konkoly.She is his wife from 2014.She works as a handball youth coach and a teacher in primary school.
