= Viktória Pácz =

Hungarian handball player (born 1990)

Personal information
- Full name: Anna Viktória Pácz
- Nationality: Hungarian
- Born: 24 May 1990 (age 36) Tatabánya, Hungary
- Height: 1.76 m (5 ft 9 in)

Sport
- Sport: Handball
- Position: Goalkeeper
- Current club: Retired

Youth career
- Years: Team
- 2004–2007: Alcoa FKC

Senior clubs
- Years: Team
- 2007–2008: Alcoa FKC
- 2008–2009: Kiskunhalas NKSE
- loan: → Csömör KSK
- 2009–11: DVSC
- loan: → Orosházi NKC

Viktória Pácz (born 24 May 1990 in Tatabánya) is a former Hungarian handball goalkeeper who was most recently under contract with DVSC.

== Achievements ==
- Nemzeti Bajnokság I:
  - Silver Medallist: 2010, 2011
- Magyar Kupa:
  - Silver Medallist: 2011
