= Daisy Hage =

Dutch handball player (born 1993)

Personal information
- Nationality: Dutch
- Born: 2 March 1993 (age 33) The Hague, Netherlands
- Height: 1.74 m (5 ft 9 in)

Sport
- Sport: Handball
- Position: Left wing
- Current club: HV Quintus
- Number: 9

Senior clubs
- Years: Team
- 2012–: HV Quintus
National team
- Years: Team
- –: Netherlands

Daisy Hage (born 2 March 1993) is a Dutch handball player who plays for HV Quintus.
