= Gnonsiane Niombla =

French handball player (born 1990)

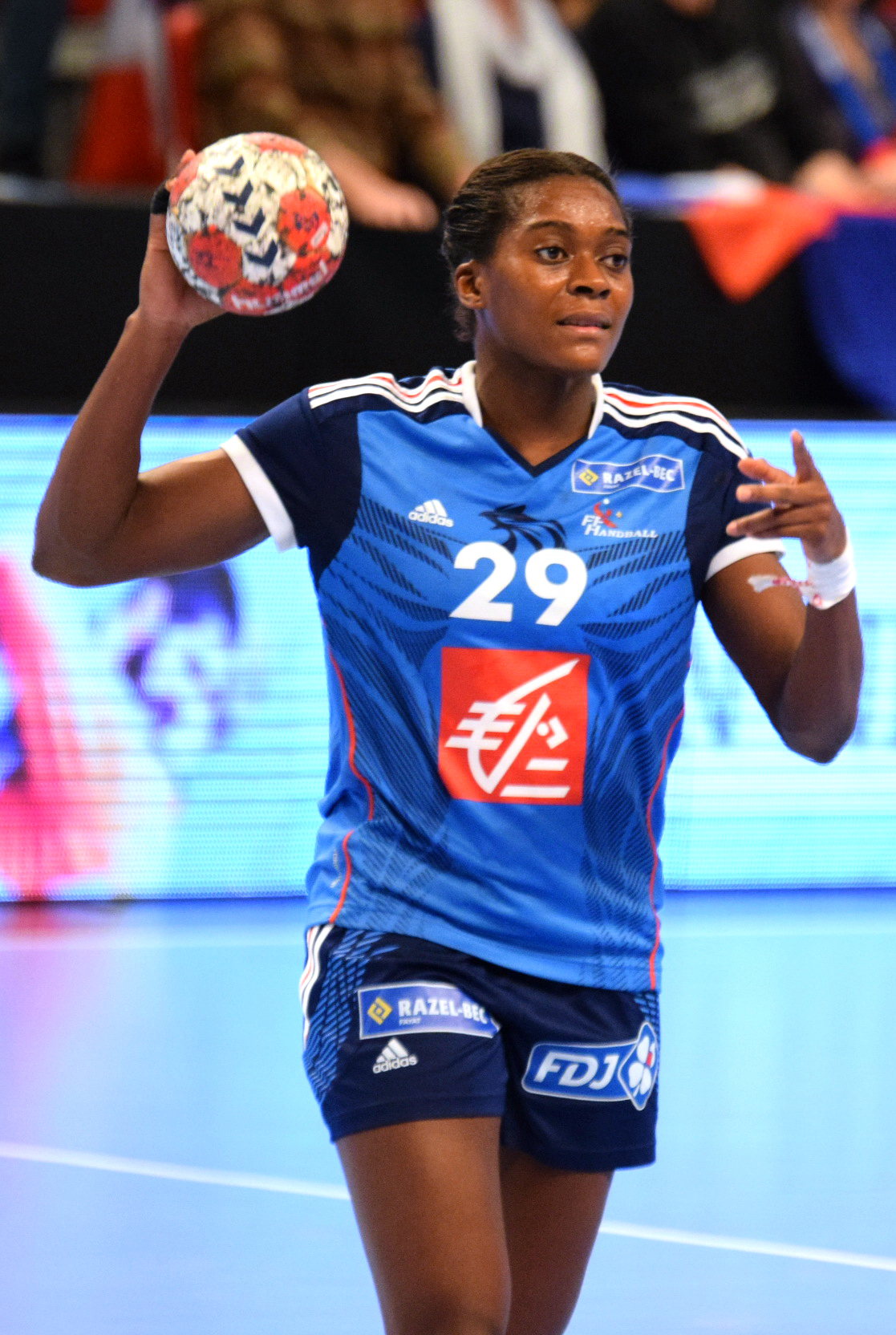
- Niombla in 2015

Personal information
- Nationality: French, Senegalese
- Born: 9 July 1990 (age 36) Villeurbanne, France
- Height: 1.72 m (5 ft 8 in)

Sport
- Sport: Handball
- Position: Left back-Centre back
- Current club: Jeanne d'Arc Dijon Handball
- Number: 29

Senior clubs
- Years: Team
- –2010: ASUL Vaulx-en-Velin
- 2010–2016: Fleury Loiret HB
- 2016–2018: CSM București
- 2018–2019: Metz Handball
- 2019–2021: Siófok KC
- 2021–2023: Paris 92
- 2023–2025: CS Gloria Bistrița-Năsăud
- 2025–: Jeanne d'Arc Dijon Handball
National team
Years	Team	Apps	(Gls)
2013–2019	France	108	(233)
2023–	Senegal	5	(13)
Medal record
Olympic Games
Silver medal – second place	2016 Rio de Janeiro	Team
World Championship
Gold medal – first place	2017 Germany
European Championship
Gold medal – first place	2018 France
Bronze medal – third place	2016 Sweden

Gnonsiane Niombla (born 9 July 1990) is a French-Senegalese female handball player for Jeanne d'Arc Dijon Handball. She has previously represented both the French national team and the Senegal national team.

She is both a World Champion and European Champion with France. On 1 December 2016, Niombla was awarded the rank of Chevalier (knight) of the French National Order of Merit.

== Career ==
Niombla played for ASUL Vaulx-en-Velin until 2010, where she won the Nationale 1, the third tier of French handball. She then joined Fleury Loiret HB. Here she won the French championship in 2015, the French League Cup in 2015 and 2016 and the Coupe de France in 2014. In 2015 she also reached the final of the EHF Cup Winners' Cup.

In 2016 she joined Romanian CSM București. Here she won the double in both of her two seasons at the club.

In 2018 she joined Metz Handball. Here she won the French Championship and Cup in 2019. Afterwards she joined Hungarian Siófok KC.

She returned to France in 2021 and joined Paris 92.

In 2023 she joined Romanian team CS Gloria Bistrița-Năsăud. In March 2025 she returned to France and Jeanne d'Arc Dijon Handball on a „joker médical“ transfer.

=== National team ===
Niombla made her debut for the French national team on 20 March 2013. She then represented France at the 2013 World Championship, 2014 European Championship and the 2015 World Championship.

At the 2016 Olympics she won silver medals, losing to Russia in the final.

At the 2016 European Championship she won bronze medals.

A year later she won her first international gold when France won the 2017 World Championships. A year later she was part of the French team that won the 2018 European Championship, played at home. This was the first time France won the European Championship.

She also represented France at the 2019 World Championship.

In 2023 she represented the Senegalese national team. At the 2025 World Women's Handball Championship in Germany she represented Senegal again.

== Honours ==
- Olympic Games:
  - Silver Medalist: 2016
- World Championship:
  - Gold Medalist: 2017
- European Championship:
  - Gold Medalist: 2018
  - Bronze Medalist: 2016
- European Youth Championship:
  - Winner: 2007
- Romanian Championship:
  - Winner: 2017, 2018
- Romanian Cup:
  - Winner: 2017, 2018
- Romanian Supercup:
  - Winner: 2016, 2017
- French Championship:
  - Winner: 2015
  - Silver Medalist: 2013
- French Cup:
  - Winner: 2014
- French League Cup:
  - Winner: 2015, 2016
  - Finalist: 2014
- EHF Cup Winners' Cup:
  - Finalist: 2015
- EHF Champions League:
  - Bronze Medalist: 2017, 2018
