= Júlia Hársfalvi =

Hungarian handball player (born 1996)

Personal information
- Nationality: Hungarian
- Born: 12 November 1996 (age 29) Zalaegerszeg, Hungary
- Height: 1.68 m (5 ft 6 in)

Sport
- Sport: Handball
- Position: Left Wing
- Current club: Ferencvárosi TC
- Number: 15

Senior clubs
- Years: Team
- 2015–2019: Győri ETO KC
- 2017–2018: → Debreceni VSC (loan)
- 2018–2019: → TuS Metzingen (loan)
- 2019–2021: Siófok KC
- 2021–: Ferencvárosi TC
National team
Years	Team	Apps	(Gls)
2017–	Hungary	18	(34)
- Updated on 10 December 2025

Júlia Hársfalvi (born 12 November 1996) is a Hungarian handballer who plays for Ferencvárosi TC.

== Achievements ==
- EHF Champions League:
  - Gold: 2017
  - Silver: 2016, 2023
- Nemzeti Bajnokság I:
  - Gold: 2016, 2017, 2024
  - Silver: 2022, 2023
- Magyar Kupa:
  - Gold: 2016, 2022, 2023, 2024, 2025
- Handball-Bundesliga:
  - Bronze: 2019
