= Melinda Pastrovics =

Hungarian handball player (born 1981)

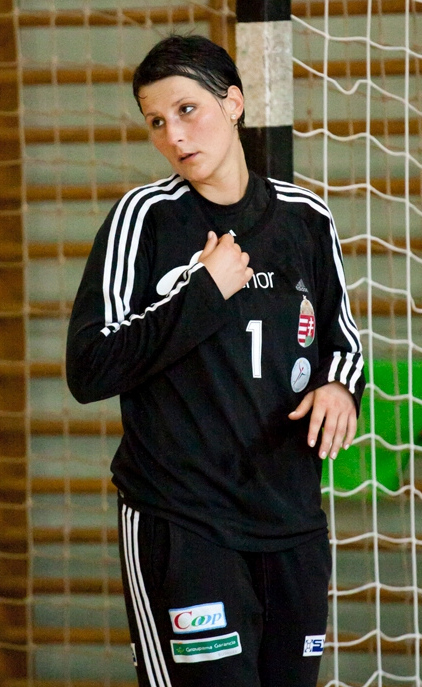

Personal information
- Full name: Melinda Pastrovics
- Nationality: Hungarian
- Born: 28 May 1981 (age 45) Kiskunhalas, Hungary
- Height: 1.76 m (5 ft 9 in)

Sport
- Sport: Handball
- Position: Goalkeeper
- Current club: —

Senior clubs
- Years: Team
- –2001: Kiskunhalas NKSE
- 2001–2002: Ferencvárosi TC
- 2002–2003: Vasas SC
- 2003–2008: Ferencvárosi TC
- 2008–2009: Debreceni VSC
- 2009–2010: Alcoa FKC
- 2010–2013: Ferencvárosi TC
- 2013–2017: Siófok KC
National team
Years	Team	Apps	(Gls)
2006–2012	Hungary	30	(0)
Medal record
Junior World Championship
Silver medal – second place	2001 Hungary	Team
- Updated on 22 July 2018

Melinda Pastrovics (born 28 May 1981) is a former Hungarian handball coach and former goalkeeper. A former Hungarian international, Pastrovics retired after a series of injuries in the second part of 2017. Currently, she is the goalkeeping coach of Siófok KC.

She made her full international debut on 8 April 2006 against Norway. Her first major tournament was the European Championship in 2008 and she also participated on the World Championship one year later.

== Achievements ==
- Nemzeti Bajnokság I:
  - Winner: 2002, 2007
  - Silver Medalist: 2006, 2012
  - Bronze Medalist: 2004, 2005, 2008, 2009, 2011
- Hungarian Cup:
  - Silver Medalist: 2007, 2009, 2010
- EHF Champions League:
  - Finalist: 2002
- EHF Cup:
  - Winner: 2006
  - Semifinalist: 2005
- EHF Cup Winners' Cup:
  - Winner: 2011, 2012
  - Semifinalist: 2007
- EHF Champions Trophy:
  - Third Placed: 2002
  - Fourth Placed: 2006
- Junior World Championship:
  - Silver Medalist: 2001
