= 2019–20 Magyar Kupa (women's handball) =

Hungarian women's handball season

Tournament details
- Country: Hungary
- Dates: 4 September 2019 – 17 May 2020
- Teams: 38

Tournament statistics
- Matches played: 34 + 4 (Final four)

Awards

The 2019–20 Magyar Kupa, known as (Hungarian: TippMix Török Bódog női Magyar Kupa) for sponsorship reasons, was the 62nd edition of the tournament.

== Schedule ==
The rounds of the 2019–20 competition are scheduled as follows:

Round	Draw date and time	Matches	Number of fixtures	Clubs	New entries this round
Round I	1 August 2019, 11:00 CEST	18 September 2019	8	16 → 8	16
Round II	20 September 2019, 11:00 CEST	9 October 2019	8	16 → 8	8
Round III	11 October 2019, 11:00 CEST	30 October 2019	8	16 → 8	8
Round IV	4 November 2019, 11:00 CET	29 January 2020	6	12 → 6	4
Round V	31 January 2020, 11:00 CET	8 April 2020	4	8 → 4	2
Final four	? 2020, 11:00 CET	16–17 May 2020	4	4 → 1	none

== Matches ==
A total of 38 matches took place, starting with First round on 4 September 2019 and culminating with the Final on 17 May 2020.

=== First round ===
The first round ties was scheduled for 4–17 September 2019.

Team 1	Score	Team 2
4 September
GBB Zrt. Kecskeméti NKSE (I/B)	41–32	(I/B) PC Trade Szeged KKSE
5 September
NKK Balmazújváros (I/B)	22–33	(I/B) Hajdúnánás SK
7 September
Pénzügyőr SE (I/B)	25–25	(I/B) Vasas SC
Tempo KSE (I/B)	28–35	(I/B) Kispest NKK-Endo +Service
11 September
DKA-Váci VKSK (II)	23–40	(I/B) Gödi SE
17 September
NEKA (I/B)	35–31	(I/B) Kozármisleny SE
Hajdúböszörményi TE (II)	21–35	(I/B) Eszterházy SC
Gárdony-Pázmánd NKK (I/B)	29–25	(I/B) Dorogi ESE

=== Second round ===
The second round ties was scheduled for 26 September – 9 October 2019.

Team 1	Score	Team 2
26 September
Oxxo Energy-Orosházi NKC (I/B)	29–29 (a)	(I/B) GBB Zrt. Kecskeméti NKSE
8 October
Eszterházy SC (I/B)	36–30	(I/B) Hajdúnánás SK
NEKA (I/B)	30–28	(I/B) Rinyamenti KC
VS Dunakeszi (I/B)	15–61	(I/B) Vasas SC
9 October
KK Ajka (II)	19–41	(I/B) Gárdony-Pázmánd NKK
Csurgói NKC (I/B)	29–29 (a)	(I/B) Mohácsi TE 1888
Gödi SE (I/B)	60–26	(I/B) Kispest NKK-Endo +Service
VSK Tököl (II)	19–34	(I/B) Moyra-Budaörs Handball

=== Third round ===
The third round ties was scheduled for 16–30 October 2019.

Team 1	Score	Team 2
16 October
Gödi SE (I/B)	23–34	(I) Kisvárda Master Good SE
22 October
Motherson-Mosonmagyaróvár (I)	29–31	(I) Dunaújvárosi Kohász KA
GBB Zrt. Kecskeméti NKSE (I/B)	22–32	(I) Szent István SE
29 October
NEKA (I/B)	47–23	(I/B) Moyra-Budaörs Handball
Gárdony-Pázmánd NKK (I/B)	27–29	(I) Szombathelyi KKA
30 October
Mohácsi TE 1888 (I/B)	19–32	(I) Alba Fehérvár KC
Vasas SC (I/B)	28–46	(I) MTK Budapest
Eszterházy SC (I/B)	27–27	(I) EUbility Group-Békéscsaba

=== Fourth round ===
The fourth round ties was scheduled for 2–29 January 2020.

Team 1	Score	Team 2
2 January
Szent István SE (I)	22–43	(I) Siófok KC
28 January
Szombathelyi KKA (I)	23–39	(I) DVSC-SCHAEFFLER
29 January
Eszterházy SC (I/B)	24–30	(I) MTK Budapest
NEKA (I/B)	20–30	(I) Kisvárda Master Good SE
Dunaújvárosi Kohász KA (I)	30–30 (a)	(I) Alba Fehérvár KC
Váci NKSE (I)	29–26	(I) Érd

=== Fifth round ===
The fifth round ties was scheduled for 8 April 2020.

Team 1	Score	Team 2
7 April
DVSC Schaeffler (I)	–	(I) FTC-Rail Cargo Hungaria
8 April
Váci NKSE (I)	–	(I) Alba Fehérvár KC
MTK Budapest (I)	–	(I) Kisvárda Master Good SE
15 April
Siófok KC (I)	–	(I) Győri Audi ETO KC

== See also ==
- 2019–20 Nemzeti Bajnokság I
- 2019–20 Nemzeti Bajnokság I/B
- 2019–20 Nemzeti Bajnokság II
