= Mária Mohácsik =

Hungarian handball player (born 1990)

Personal information
- Full name: Mária Mohácsik
- Nationality: Hungarian
- Born: 28 November 1990 (age 35) Budapest, Hungary
- Height: 1.81 m (5 ft 11 in)

Sport
- Sport: Handball
- Position: Left Back

Youth career
- Years: Team
- 2005–2008: Ferencvárosi TC

Senior clubs
- Years: Team
- 2008–2012: Ferencvárosi TC
- loan: → Kispesti NKK

Mária Mohácsik (born 28 November 1990 in Budapest) is a former Hungarian handballer.

== Achievements ==
- Nemzeti Bajnokság I:
  - Silver Medallist: 2009
  - Bronze Medallist: 2011
- Magyar Kupa:
  - Silver Medallist: 2010
- EHF Cup Winners' Cup:
  - Winner: 2011
