= Bent Dahl =

Norwegian handball player and coach

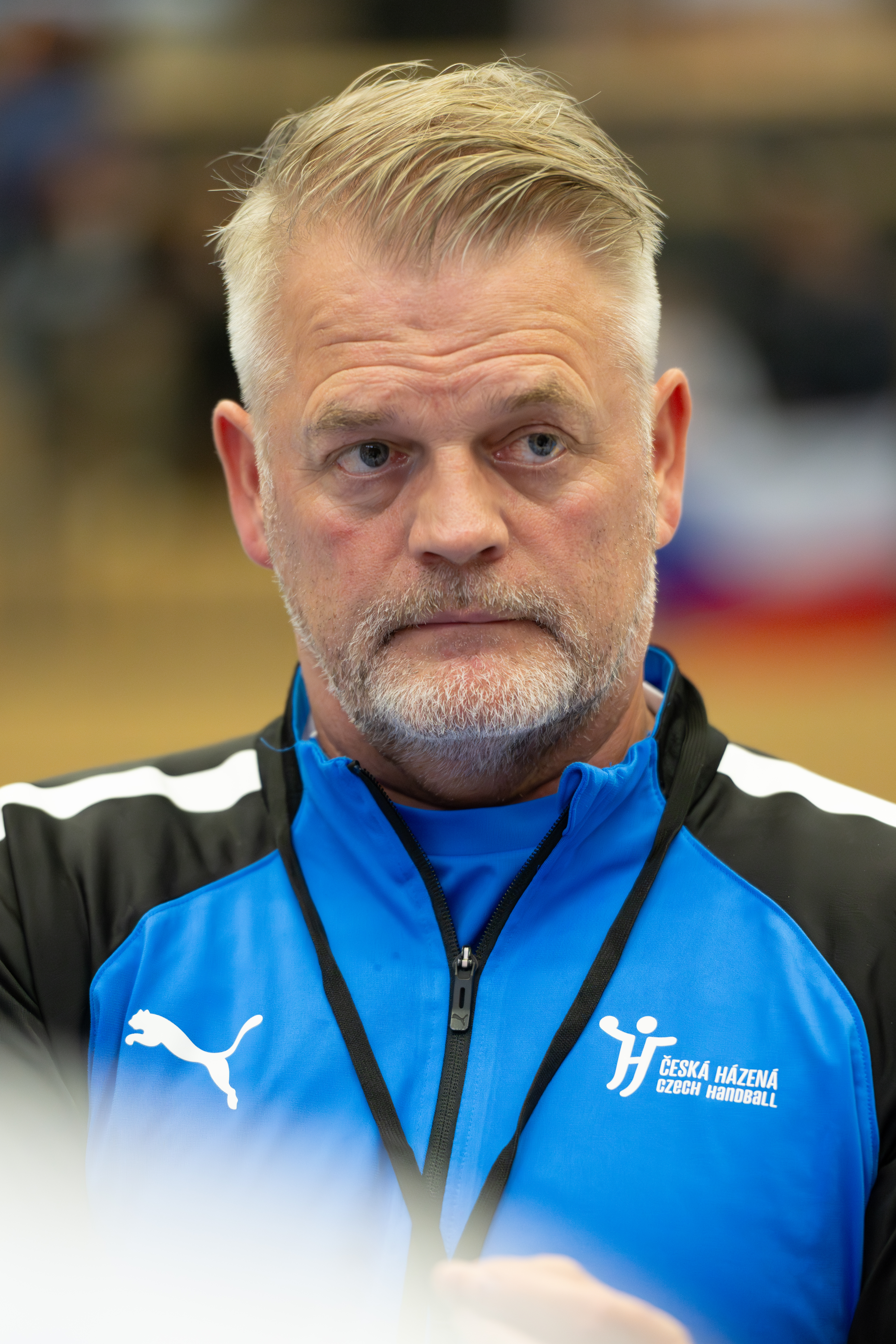

Personal information
- Nationality: Norwegian
- Born: 5 October 1970 (age 56) Vestfold, Norway

Sport
- Sport: Handball
- Current club: Serbia (national team)

Senior clubs
- Years: Team
- –: Reistad
- –: Drammen HK

Teams managed
- 1997–2000: Drammen HK
- 1999–2008: Norway junior
- 2010–2011: Oppsal IF
- 2011–2013: Skrim Kongsberg
- 2015–2016: Italy
- 2016–2018: St.Hallvard Håndball
- 2018–2019: Skrim Kongsberg (assistant)
- 2018–2020: Siófok KC (assistant)
- 2020–2021: Siófok KC
- 2021–2024: SCM Râmnicu Vâlcea
- 2022–2025: Czech Republic
- 2025: Serbia

Bent Dahl (born 5 October 1970) is a Norwegian handball coach and former player.

Dahl has been coaching several teams during his coaching career, including the Norway women's national junior handball team, the Italian women's national team, Siófok KC and Skrim Kongsberg. He has also been the analytical coach for the Russian national team from 2012 to 2016 and assistant coach for the Romanian women's national team.

It was announced on 20 September 2021 that Dahl would be taking over the Romanian top-tier team SCM Râmnicu Vâlcea with immediate effect.

In August 2022 he joined the Czech women's national team as the new national coach, where he was set to qualify the team for the 2023 World Women's Handball Championship. At the 2023 World Championship, he led the team to become the surprise of the tournament, when they reached the quarter-final.

He left the Czech national team after the 2024 European Championship, and was replaced by Tomáš Hlavatý. He was also head coach of the Serbian national team for a short period, to qualify the team for the 2025 World Women's Handball Championship, which succeeded.
