= Camille Aoustin =

French handballer (born 1990)

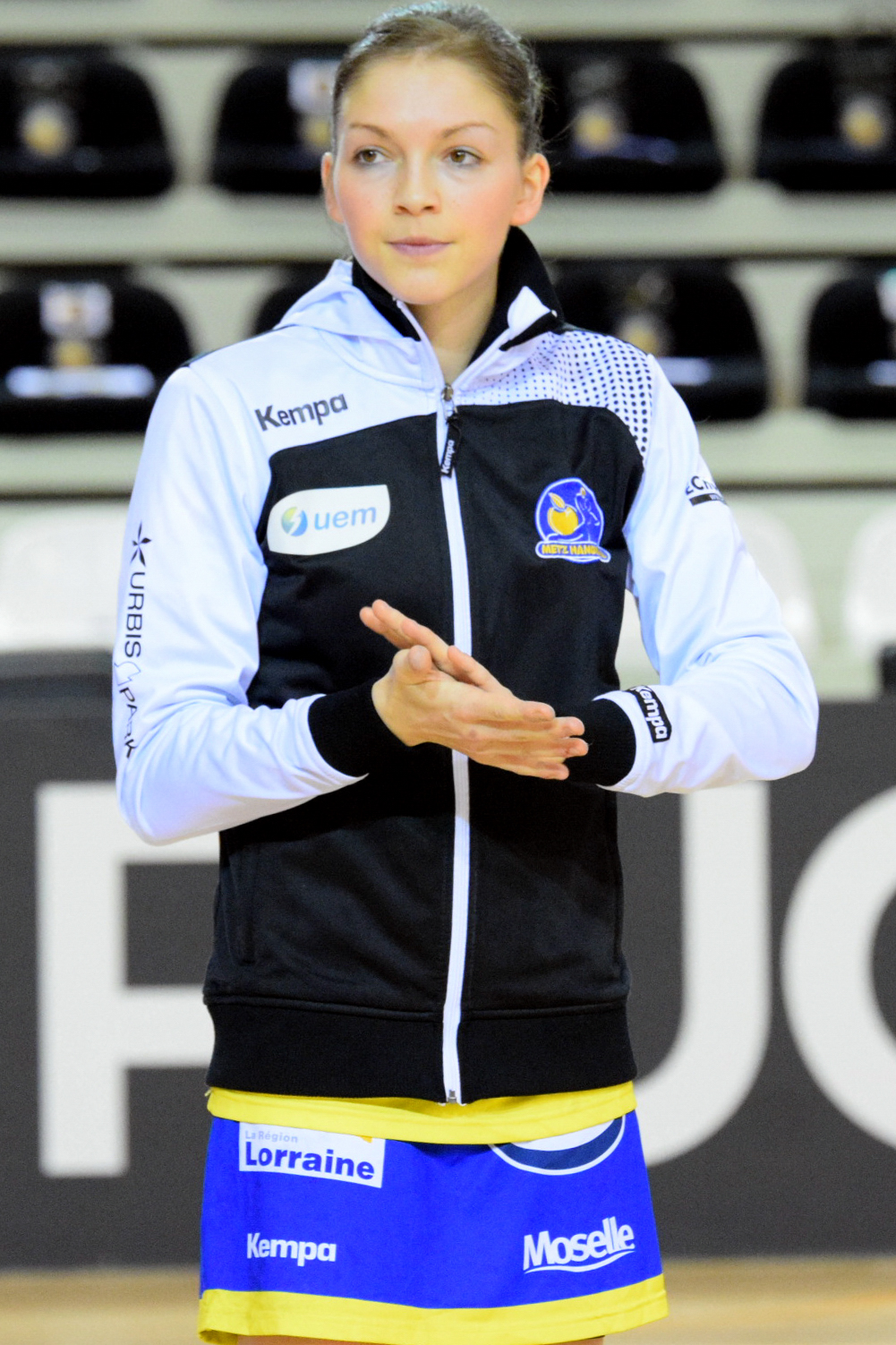

Personal information
- Nationality: French
- Born: 13 February 1990 (age 36) Cherbourg, France
- Height: 1.69 m (5 ft 7 in)

Sport
- Sport: Handball
- Position: Left wing
- Current club: Retired

Senior clubs
- Years: Team
- 2008–2010: Havre HAC
- 2010–2011: Octeville-sur-Mer
- 2011–2014: Chambray THB
- 2014–2015: Nantes LAH
- 2015–2017: Metz Handball
- 2017–2021: Siófok KC
- 2021–2023: ESBF Besançon
- 2023-2025: Sambre-Avesnois Handball

Camille Aoustin (born 13 February 1990) is a French former handballer who played for Hungarian club Siófok KC as well as various French clubs.

In 2016 she won the French Championship with Metz Handball.

== Biography ==
Drawn to soccer at a very young age, Camille Aoustin considered pursuing a career in the sport but switched to handball and joined the Caen youth academy at the age of 15. After spending time at Le Havre’s training center, she played primarily with the reserve team, though she made a few appearances with the first team. She was named best left wing in the N1 league in 2010. For four seasons, she then played in the second division, first at Octeville-sur-Mer (2010–2011) and then at Chambray (2011–2014). She credits her meeting with Guillaume Marquès, coach of Chambray Touraine Handball, as a turning point in her career, as he quickly placed his trust in her by giving her playing time. She was named the best left wing in the second division in 2014. She signed with Nantes for the 2014–2015 season. She played consistently in the first division there and stood out for her performances.

In 2015, Camille Aoustin joined Metz Handball to “prove she can achieve great things” and “win titles,” as she put it. She quickly earned significant playing time alongside the other starter at her position, Marion Maubon. In May 2016, she won her first French championship title with Metz after defeating Fleury Loiret in the final.

She left Metz after two seasons, having won the league title and the French Cup in 2016–2017 and reached the quarterfinals of the Champions League. Released by Metz following the arrival of Manon Houette, she signed with the Hungarian club Siófok KC in August 2017.

She got off to a strong start to the season and quickly established herself in the team upon her arrival in Hungary. In 2019, she won the EHF Cup final with Siófok KC. In the final against the Danish team Team Esbjerg, she stood out by scoring five goals in the second leg.

In 2021, she returned to France to take over from Chloé Valentini at ES Besançon.

In 2023, she joined Sambre Avesnois in Division 2 and then Division 1, and she retired from competitive play in the summer of 2025 to become the club's general manager.

== Achievements ==
- Championnat de France:
  - Winner: 2016
- Coupe de la Ligue :
  - Finalist: 2009
- EHF Cup:
  - Winner: 2019
