= Krisztina Gyetván =

Hungarian handball player (born 1979)

Personal information
- Full name: Krisztina Gyetván
- Nationality: Hungarian
- Born: 20 December 1979 (age 46) Vác, Hungary

Sport
- Sport: Handball
- Position: Middle Back
- Current club: Retired

Senior clubs
- Years: Team
- 1998–2001: Váci NKSE
- loan: → Malév SC
- 2001–2003: Gödi SE
- 2003–2008: Csömör KSK
- 2008–2009: Váci NKSE
- 2009–2011: Érdi VSE
- 2011–2012: Váci NKSE

Krisztina Gyetván (born 20 December 1979 in Vác) is a former Hungarian handballer.
