= Nelli Such =

Hungarian handball player (born 1992)

Personal information
- Nationality: Hungarian
- Born: 12 May 1992 (age 34) Békéscsaba, Hungary
- Height: 1.78 m (5 ft 10 in)

Sport
- Sport: Handball
- Position: Right Wing
- Current club: Ferencvárosi TC
- Number: 23

Youth career
- Years: Team
- 2005–2008: Békéscsabai ENKSE
- 2008–2010: Ferencvárosi TC

Senior clubs
- Years: Team
- 2010–2014: Ferencvárosi TC
- 2014–2023: Siófok KC
- 2023–2026: Váci NKSE

Nelli Such (born 12 May 1992 in Békéscsaba) is a Hungarian handballer who plays for Siófok KC in right wing position.

== Achievements ==
- Nemzeti Bajnokság I:
  - Silver Medalist: 2012, 2013, 2014
  - Bronze Medalist: 2011, 2019
- EHF Cup Winners' Cup:
  - Winner: 2011, 2012
- EHF Cup:
  - Winner: 2019
