= Simone Böhme =

Danish handball player (born 1991)

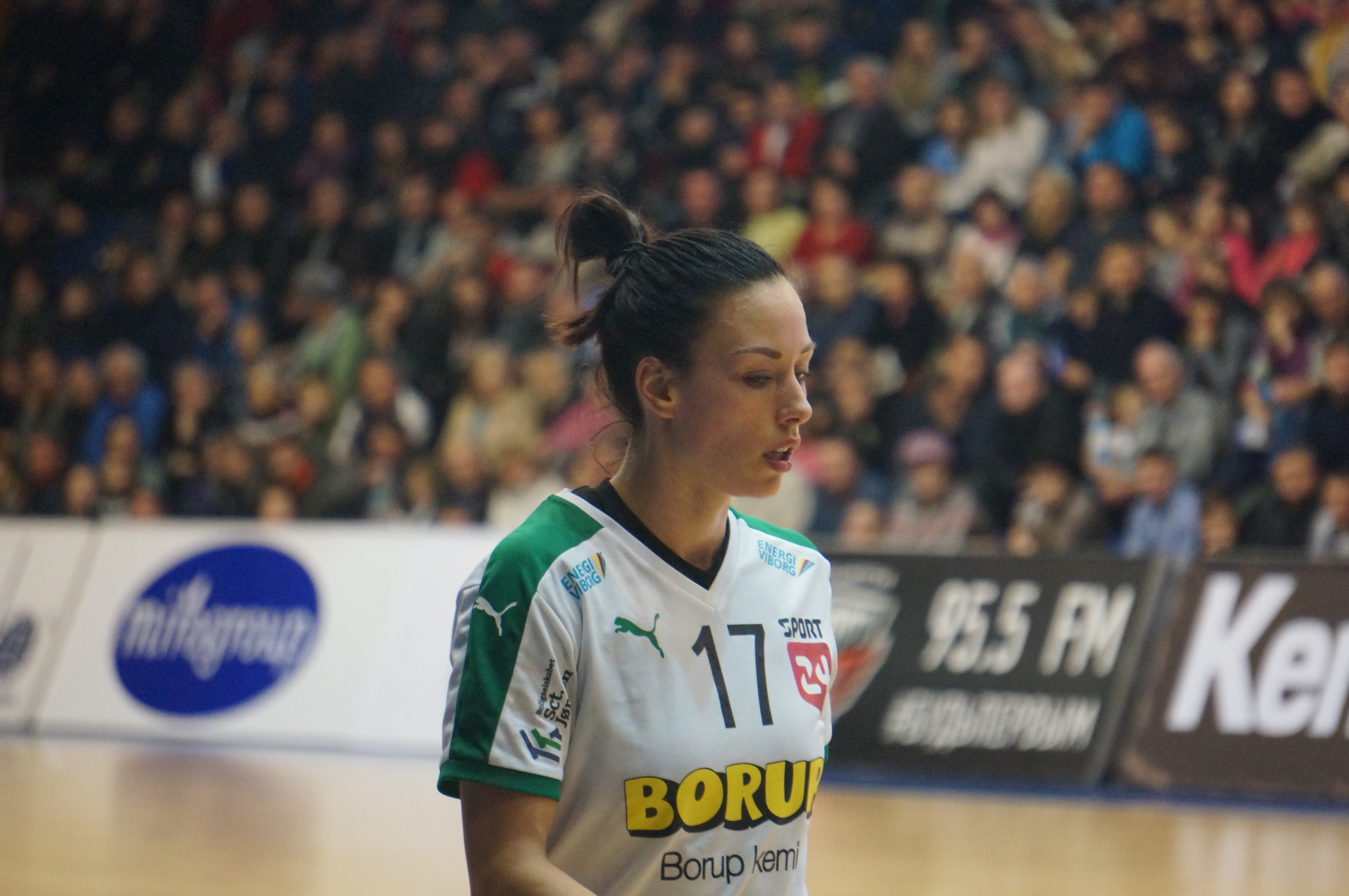

Personal information
- Full name: Simone Böhme
- Nationality: Danish
- Born: 17 August 1991 (age 35) Spentrup, Denmark
- Height: 1.69 m (5 ft 7 in)

Sport
- Sport: Handball
- Position: Right wing
- Current club: HC Dunărea Brăila

Senior clubs
- Years: Team
- 2009–2012: Randers HK
- 2012–2015: Silkeborg-Voel KFUM
- 2015–2017: Viborg HK
- 2017: CSM București
- 2017–2022: Siófok KC
- 2022–2023: Kastamonu
- 2023–2024: CSM Targu Jiu
- 2024: Ikast Håndbold
- 2024-: HC Dunărea Brăila
National team
Years	Team	Apps	(Gls)
2015–2022	Denmark	50	(56)
Medal record
World Championship
Bronze medal – third place	2021 Spain
- Updated on 22 January 2024

Simone Böhme (born 17 August 1991) is a Danish female handballer for HC Dunărea Brăila and the Danish national team.

== Career ==
Böhme won the 2010 EHF Cup with Randers HK. Despite sporting success the switched clubs to Silkeborg-Voel KFUM due to lack of playing time. In 2012/2013 season she was voted as the best player in the Danish 1st Division.

In 2015 Böhme switched to Viborg HK on a 2-year contract. In January 2017 the Romanian club CSM Bucuresti where she played the rest of the season. In the summer of 2017 she switched to Hungarian Siófok KC, again due to seeking more playing time. Here she played until 2022 where she moved to Turkish handball.

== International honours ==
- EHF Champions League:
  - Bronze Medalist: 2017
- EHF Cup:
  - Winner: 2010, 2019
