= Joanna Drabik =

Polish handball player (born 1993)

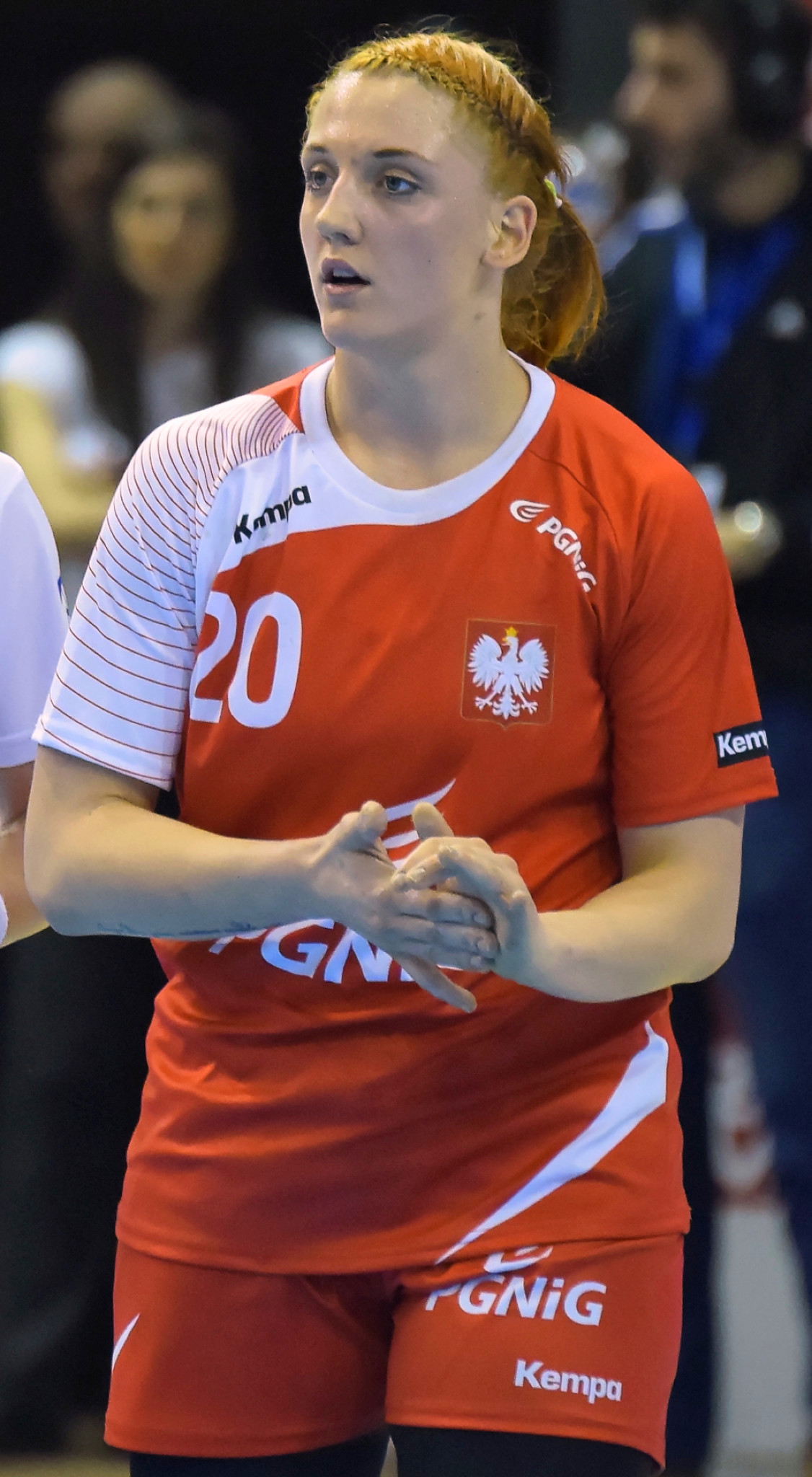

Personal information
- Nationality: Polish
- Born: 28 October 1993 (age 32) Włoszczowa, Poland
- Height: 1.80 m (5 ft 11 in)

Sport
- Sport: Handball
- Position: Pivot
- Current club: MKS Zagłębie Lubin
- Number: 20

Senior clubs
- Years: Team
- 2011–2013: KSS Kielce
- 2013–2018: MKS Lublin
- 2018–2020: Siófok KC
- 2020–: MKS Zagłębie Lubin
National team
Years	Team	Apps	(Gls)
2012–	Poland	79	(139)

Joanna Drabik (born 28 October 1993) is a Polish handballer for MKS Zagłębie Lubin and the Polish national team.

She participated at the 2018 European Women's Handball Championship.

== Achievements ==
- Polish Championship:
  - Winner: 2014
- Carpathian Trophy:
  - Winner: 2017
