= Szilvia Tarjányi =

Hungarian handball player (born 1992)

Personal information
- Full name: Szilvia Tarjányi
- Nationality: Hungarian
- Born: 11 January 1992 (age 34) Csongrád, Hungary
- Height: 1.76 m (5 ft 9 in)

Sport
- Sport: Handball
- Position: Line Player

Youth career
- Years: Team
- –2006: Hódmezővásárhelyi NKC
- 2006–2009: Győri ETO KC

Senior clubs
- Years: Team
- 2009–2010: Győri ETO KC
- 2010–2011: Veszprém Barabás KC
- 2011–2014: Békéscsabai ENKSE
- 2014–2015: Vasas SC
- 2015–2018: Kisvárdai KC

Szilvia Tarjányi (born 11 January 1992 in Csongrád) is a Hungarian handballer. She has been capped for the Hungarian junior national team.

== Achievements ==
- Nemzeti Bajnokság I:
  - Winner: 2010
- Magyar Kupa:
  - Silver Medalist: 2012
- EHF Champions League:
  - Semifinalist: 2010
