= Anđela Janjušević =

Serbian handball player (born 1995)

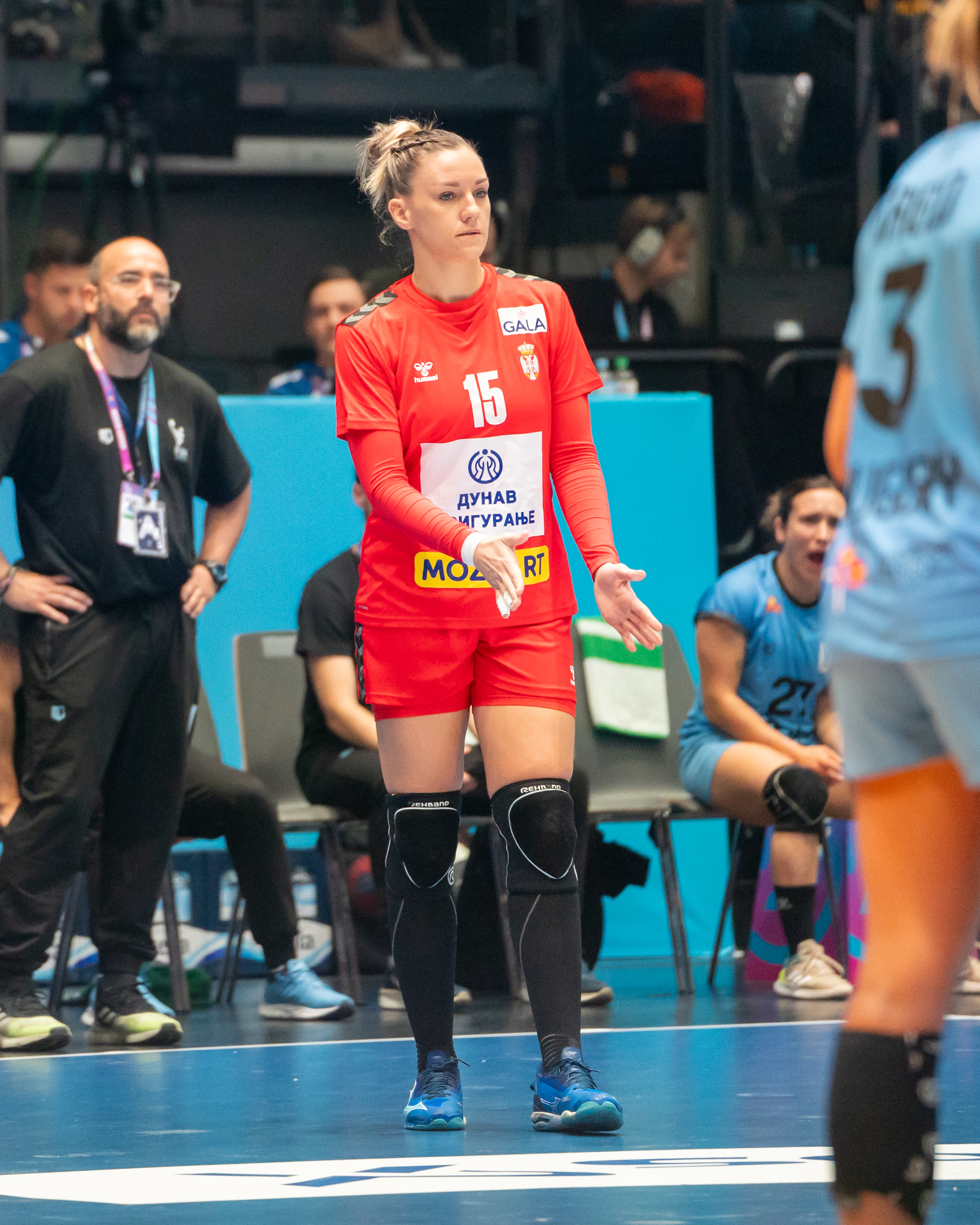

Personal information
- Nationality: Serbian
- Born: 18 June 1995 (age 31) Belgrade, FR Yugoslavia
- Height: 1.78 m (5 ft 10 in)

Sport
- Sport: Handball
- Position: Right back
- Current club: Siófok KC
- Number: 88

Senior clubs
- Years: Team
- 2013–2014: HC BMS Milenium
- 2014–2016: Radnički Kragujevac
- 2016–2020: Siófok KC
- 2020–2021: SCM Gloria Buzău
- 2021–2022: Siófok KC
- 2022–: CS Rapid București
National team
Years	Team	Apps	(Gls)
–	Serbia	74	(197)
Medal record
Summer Universiade
Bronze medal – third place	2015 Gwangju	Team
- Updated on 26 October 2025

Anđela Janjušević (Serbian Cyrillic: Анђела Јањушевић; born 18 June 1995) is a Serbian handball player for CS Rapid București and the Serbian national team.
