= Piroska Szamoránsky =

Hungarian handball player (born 1986)

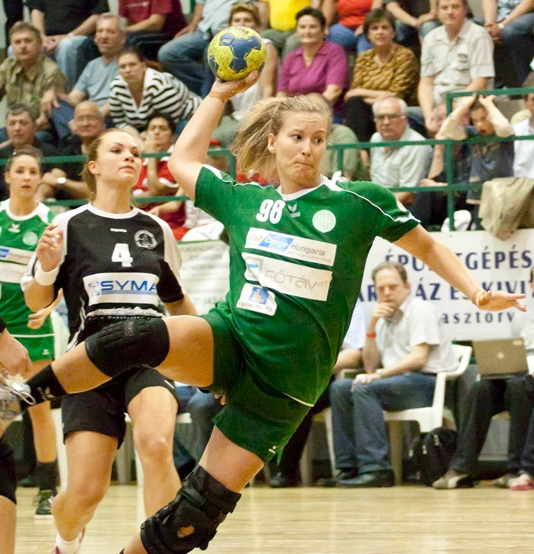
- Szamoránsky in 2011

Personal information
- Nationality: Hungarian
- Born: 9 July 1986 (age 40) Győr, Hungary
- Height: 1.71 m (5 ft 7 in)

Sport
- Sport: Handball
- Position: Pivot

Senior clubs
- Years: Team
- –2005: Győri ETO KC
- 2005–2009: Ferencvárosi TC
- 2009–2010: Budućnost Podgorica
- 2010–2016: Ferencvárosi TC
- 2017–2019: Váci NKSE
National team
Years	Team	Apps	(Gls)
2006–2016	Hungary	145	(282)
Medal record
European Championship
Bronze medal – third place	2012 Serbia

Piroska Szamoránsky (born 9 July 1986) is a former Hungarian handball player.

== Career ==
=== Club ===
As a child she practiced aerobic, jazz ballet and rope skipping. She caught the fancy of handball around 1995, by watching matches in TV, and that time she determined to pursue a professional handball career.

She started to play in the Balázs Béla ÁMK under Zoltán Basák. When she started high school, she signed a contract with Győri ETO KC. Szamoránsky came through the ranks quickly, having won the national championship both on youth and junior level and later with the first team as well. However, in 2005, after Győr player policy favoured the older and more experienced players against youngsters, the pivot decided to leave the club.

Éva Szarka, the coach of Ferencvárosi TC, immediately signed the talented line player who became an important member of the team that won the league title in 2007. After a short spell in Montenegro, she rejoined the club in June 2010.

=== International ===
Szamoránsky debuted in the national team on 4 April 2006 against Norway. In the same year, she participated in the European Championship, finishing in fifth place. She represented Hungary in two more European Championships (2008, 2010) and in a World Championship (2007). She was also member of the Hungarian team that finished fourth in the 2008 Summer Olympics.

== Personal ==
She has a twin sister, Anikó, also a professional handballer, who just like Piroska, plays as a line player.

== Achievements ==
- Nemzeti Bajnokság I:
  - Winner: 2005, 2007
  - Silver Medalist: 2004, 2006, 2009, 2012
  - Bronze Medalist: 2008, 2011
- Magyar Kupa:
  - Silver Medllist: 2007
- Montenegrin Championship:
  - Winner: 2010
- Montenegrin Cup:
  - Winner: 2010
- EHF Cup:
  - Winner: 2006
- EHF Cup Winners' Cup:
  - Winner: 2010, 2011, 2012
  - Semifinalist: 2007
- EHF Champions Trophy:
  - Fourth Placed: 2006
- European Championship:
  - Bronze Medalist: 2012

== Individual awards ==
- Team of the Tournament Pivot of the Baia Mare Champions Trophy: 2014
