= Renáta Mörtel =

Hungarian handball player (born 1983)

Personal information
- Full name: Renáta Mörtel
- Nationality: Hungarian
- Born: 12 October 1983 (age 43) Budapest, Hungary
- Height: 1.82 m (6 ft 0 in)

Sport
- Sport: Handball
- Position: Left Back
- Current club: Retired

Senior clubs
- Years: Team
- –2006: Győri ETO KC
- 2006–2008: Dunaújváros
- 2008–2009: RK Krim
- 2009–2011: DVSC
- 2011–2012: Siófok KC
National team
Years	Team	Apps	(Gls)
2005–2009	Hungary	12	(13)

Renáta Mörtel (born 12 October 1983 in Budapest) is a former Hungarian handball player who played for Siófok KC at the left back position.

== Achievements ==
- Nemzeti Bajnokság I:
  - Winner: 2005, 2006
  - Silver Medallist: 2004, 2010, 2011
- Magyar Kupa:
  - Winner: 2005, 2006
  - Silver Medallist: 2004, 2008, 2011
- Slovenian Championship:
  - Winner: 2009
- Slovenian Cup:
  - Winner:2009
- EHF Cup:
  - Finalist: 2004, 2005
- EHF Cup Winners' Cup:
  - Finalist: 2006
  - Semifinalist: 2003

== Individual awards ==
- Nemzeti Bajnokság I Top Scorer: 2008
