= Csilla Mazák-Németh =

Hungarian handball player (born 1989)

Personal information
- Full name: Csilla Mazák-Németh
- Nationality: Hungarian
- Born: 21 January 1989 (age 37) Budapest, Hungary
- Height: 1.78 m (5 ft 10 in)

Sport
- Sport: Handball
- Position: Right Back
- Current club: MTK Budapest
- Number: 30

Youth career
- Years: Team
- 2004–2006: Ferencvárosi TC

Senior clubs
- Years: Team
- 2006–2011: Ferencvárosi TC
- 2011–2021: Siófok KC
- 2021–2024: MTK Budapest

Csilla Mazák-Németh, née Németh, (born 21 January 1989 in Budapest) is a Hungarian handballer who plays for MTK Budapest in right back position.

== Achievements ==
- Nemzeti Bajnokság I:
  - Winner: 2007
  - Silver Medallist: 2009
  - Bronze Medallist: 2008, 2011
- Magyar Kupa:
  - Silver Medallist: 2010
- EHF Cup Winners' Cup:
  - Winner: 2011
  - Semifinalist: 2007

== Personal life ==
She is married, her husband is Martin Mazák, Slovak handball player. Their daughter, Emma was born in January 2019.
