= Siófok KC =

Hungarian women's handball team

- Full name: Siófok Kézilabda Club
- Short name: SKC
- Founded: 2009
- Arena: Kiss Szilárd Sportcsarnok, Siófok
- Capacity: 1400
- President: János Fodor
- Head coach: Károly Pintér
- League: Nemzeti Bajnokság II
- 2022–23: Nemzeti Bajnokság I, 5th
- Club colours
| Home | Away |

Siófok Kézilabda Club is a former Hungarian professional women's handball team from Siófok, that currently play in the Nemzeti Bajnokság II. They have competed in lower divisions until 2006, when they have won the third-tier championship and gained promotion to the Nemzeti Bajnokság I/B. That time a businessman, János Fodor took over the club, and with the support of the local government, he guaranteed the financial background to fulfil the club's long-term plans.

In May 2009, SKC received a surprise request from the Hungarian Handball Federation to replace the financially struggling Tajtavill-Nyíradony and join the top level championship. Siófok met all demands and unexpectedly started the 2009–10 season in the NB I. Despite being newcomers, the team performed well and finished in the respectable seventh position.

The club did not receive a license for the 2023/2024 season because it did not settle its debts by the deadline. They play in the third division from the 2023/2024 season.

== Crest, colours, supporters ==
=== Naming history ===
- 2009–2010: Siófok KC
- 2010–2015: Siófok KC-Galérius Fürdő
- 2015–2016: Siófok KTC KFT
- 2016–present: Siófok KC

=== Kit manufacturers and Shirt sponsor ===
The following table shows in detail Siófok KC kit manufacturers and shirt sponsors by year:

| Period | Kit manufacturer | Shirt sponsor |
|---|---|---|
| 2009–2011 | hummel | Gropius / raabersped / Dalessa |
| 2011–2012 | hummel | Sagemcom |
| 2012 | Erima | – |
| 2013 | adidas | – |
| 2013–2015 | hummel | propannonia |
| 2015 | hummel | – |
| 2016– | hummel | Szerencsejáték Zrt., Cheeseland |

== Kits ==
HOME
| 2012–13 | 2017–19 | 2020– |

AWAY
| 2012–13 | 2016–17 | 2017–19 | 2020– |

THIRD
| 2016–17 | 2017–18 | 2018–19 | 2019–20 |

== Sports Hall information ==
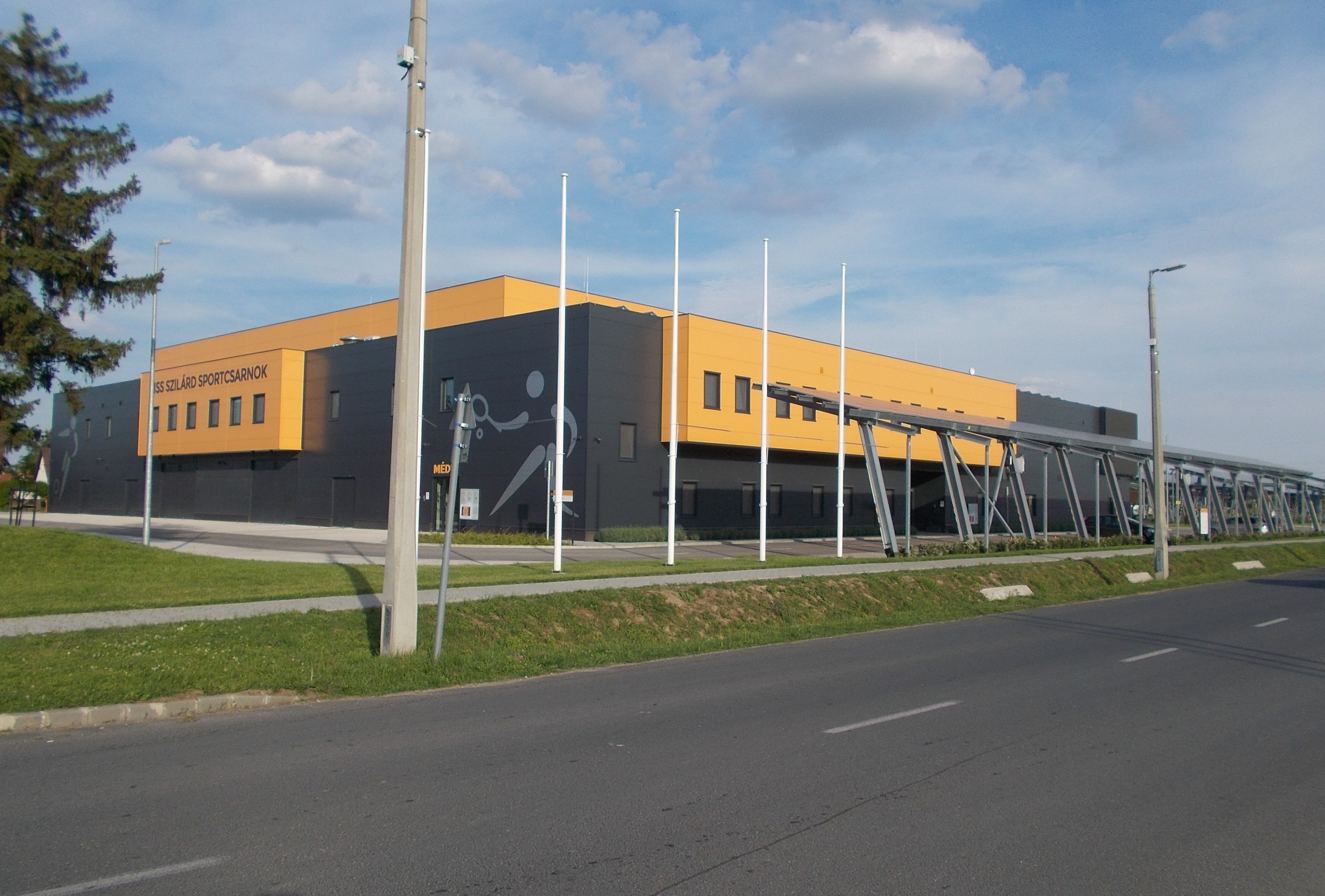
Home hall: Kiss Szilárd Sportcsarnok

- Name: – Kiss Szilárd Sportcsarnok
- City: – Siófok
- Capacity: – 1400
- Address: – 8600 Siófok, Szekrényessy Kálmán utca 1.

== Former notable players ==
=== Goalkeepers ===
- (Hungary) Melinda Pastrovics
- (Hungary) Melinda Szikora
- (Hungary) Éva Kiss
- (Hungary) Orsolya Herr
- (Hungary) Zsófi Szemerey
- (Hungary) Hajnalka Futaki
- (Hungary) Vivien Víg
- (Hungary) Nóra Lajtos
- (Hungary) Andrea Scholtz
- (Romania) Denisa Dedu
- (Norway) Silje Solberg (2018–2020)
- (Germany) Dinah Eckerle
- (Azerbaijan) Valentyna Salamakha
- (Slovenia) Maja Vojnović
- (Montenegro) Marina Rajčić
- (Belarus) Valiantsina Kumpel

=== Right wings ===
- (Hungary) Viktória Lukács
- (Hungary) Bernadett Bódi
- (Hungary) Nelly Such
- (Hungary) Adrienn Kovács
- (Hungary) Anita Sterbik
- (France) Chloé Bulleux
- (Denmark) Simone Böhme
- (Serbia) Ana Kojić

=== Right backs ===
- (Hungary) Luca Szekerczés
- (Hungary) Anita Herr
- (Hungary) Nikolett Papp
- (France) Marie-Paule Gnabouyou
- (Romania) Melinda Geiger
- (Czech Republic) Michaela Hrbková
- (Serbia) Marija Agbaba
- (Serbia) Anđela Janjušević
- (Spain) Mireya González
- (Netherlands) Laura van der Heijden

=== Line players ===
- (Hungary) Szilvia Ábrahám
- (Hungary) Szederke Sirián
- (Hungary) Anikó Szamoránsky
- (Hungary) Viktória Szűcs
- (Hungary) Olívia Kiss
- (Tunisia) (Hungary) Asma Elghaoui
- (Croatia) Katarina Ježić
- (Croatia) Andrea Seric
- (Brazil) Daniela Piedade
- (Netherlands) Danick Snelder
- (Serbia) Jelena Agbaba
- (Poland) Joanna Drabik
- (Senegal) Hawa N'Diaye

=== Central backs ===
- (Hungary) Annamária Bogdanović
- (Hungary) Blanka Kajdon (2022–2023)
- (Hungary) Babett Szalai
- (Hungary) Gabriella Tóth
- (Hungary) Rita Lakatos
- (Hungary) Bettina Dajka
- (Spain) Nerea Pena
- (Spain) Macarena Aguilar
- (France) Estelle Nze Minko
- (Russia) Tatyana Khmyrova
- (Russia) Irina Nikitina
- (Denmark) Camilla Maibom
- (Denmark) (Germany) Silje Brøns Petersen
- (Germany) Nina Müller

=== Left backs ===
- (Hungary) Renáta Mörtel
- (Hungary) Csilla Mazák-Németh
- (Hungary) Zsuzsanna Tomori
- (Hungary) Krisztina Triscsuk
- (Hungary) Vivien Léránt
- (Hungary) Dóra Deáki
- (Hungary) Kinga Klivinyi
- (Hungary) Nóra Valovics
- (Hungary) Mária Tóth
- (France) Gnonsiane Niombla
- (France) Dounia Abdourahim
- (France) Tamara Horacek
- (Croatia) Andrea Kobetić
- (Croatia) Dejana Milosavljević
- (Romania) Gabriela Perianu
- (Romania) Teodora Bloj
- (Brazil) Jaqueline Anastácio
- (Brazil) Silvia Pinheiro
- (Brazil) Karolina de Souza
- (Spain) Lara González Ortega
- (Norway) Malin Holta (2021–2022)
- (Norway) Kjerstin Boge Solås (2019–2020)
- (Serbia) Sanja Damnjanović
- (Slovakia) Simona Szarková

=== Left wings ===
- (Hungary) Ildikó Erdősi
- (Hungary) Ivett Szepesi
- (Hungary) Júlia Hársfalvi
- (Hungary) Szidónia Puhalák
- (France) Camille Aoustin
- (Slovenia) Tamara Mavsar

== Coaches ==
- (Hungary) József Varga (2009–2010)
- (Hungary) János Hajdu (2010)
- (Hungary) Vilmos Imre (2010–2012)
- (Hungary) Szilárd Kiss (2012–2013)
- (Hungary) Vladimir Golovin (2013–2015)
- (Denmark) Christian Dalmose (2015–2016)
- (Hungary) Roland Horváth (2016–2017)
- (Denmark) Lars Rasmussen (2017–2018)
- (Norway) Tor Odvar Moen (2018–2020)
- (Norway) Bent Dahl (2020)
- (Croatia) Zdravko Zovko (2020–2021)
- (Hungary) Gábor Danyi (2021)
- (Slovenia) Uroš Bregar (2021–2023)

== Honours ==
=== Domestic competitions ===
Nemzeti Bajnokság I (National Championship of Hungary)

- Bronze (2): 2011–12, 2018–19

Magyar Kupa (National Cup of Hungary)

- Bronze (1): 2013–14

=== European competitions ===
EHF European League

- Gold: 2018–19
- Silver: 2020–21

== Recent seasons ==
As of 19 July 2022

- Seasons in Nemzeti Bajnokság I: 14
- Seasons in Nemzeti Bajnokság I/B: 2
- Seasons in Nemzeti Bajnokság II:

| Season | Division | Pos. | Magyar kupa |
|---|---|---|---|
| 1993–94 | | | |
| 1994–95 | | | |
| 1995–96 | | | |
| 1996–97 | NB II | 7th | |
| 1997–98 | NB II | 6th | |
| 1998–99 | NB II | 7th | |
| 1999–00 | NB II | 6th | |
| 2000–01 | NB II | 11th | |
| 2001–02 | NB II | 9th | |
| 2002–03 | NB II | 4th | |

| Season | Division | Pos. | Magyar kupa |
|---|---|---|---|
| 2003–04 | NB II | 8th | |
| 2004–05 | NB II | 6th | |
| 2005–06 | NB II | 4th | |
| 2006–07 | NB II | 1st | |
| 2007–08 | NB I/B | 8th | |
| 2008–09 | NB I/B | 4th | |
| 2009–10 | NB I | 7th | |
| 2010–11 | NB I | 10th | Round 4 |
| 2011–12 | NB I | Third place | Fourth place |
| 2012–13 | NB I | 10th | Round 4 |

| Season | Division | Pos. | Magyar kupa |
|---|---|---|---|
| 2013–14 | NB I | 8th | Third place |
| 2014–15 | NB I | 5th | Round 4 |
| 2015–16 | NB I | 8th | Quarter-finals |
| 2016–17 | NB I | 8th | Round 3 |
| 2017–18 | NB I | 5th | Fourth place |
| 2018–19 | NB I | Third place | Round 4 |
| 2019–20 | NB I | 2nd | qual. for Round 4 |
| 2020–21 | NB I | 7th | Round 4 |
| 2021–22 | NB I | 6th | Third place |
| 2022–23 | NB I | | |

=== In European competition ===
Siófok score listed first. As of 26 March 2023

- Participations in EHF European League (EHF Cup): 6×
- Participations in Cup Winners' Cup: 1×

| Season | Competition | Round | Club | Home | Away | Aggregate |
|---|---|---|---|---|---|---|
| 2012–13 | EHF Cup | Third round | (Russia) Astrakhanochka | 31–22 | 28–41 | 59–63 |
| 2014–15 | Cup Winners' Cup | Third round | (North Macedonia) Metalurg Skopje | 36–14 | 26–17 | 62–31 |
| 2014–15 | Cup Winners' Cup | Round of 16 | (Austria) Hypo Niederösterreich | 25–20 | 22–30 | 47–50 |
| 2015–16 | EHF Cup | Third round | (Portugal) AC Alavarium | 40–25 | 39–21 | 79–46 |
| 2015–16 | EHF Cup | Round of 16 | (Hungary) Dunaújvárosi Kohász KA | 28–23 | 19–24 | 47–47 (a) |
| 2018–19 | EHF Cup; Winner | Second qualifying round | (Hungary) Vác | 32–26 | 35–22 | 67–48 |
| 2018–19 | EHF Cup; Winner | Third qualifying round | (Russia) Lada Togliatti | 37–26 | 26–30 | 63–56 |
| 2018–19 | EHF Cup; Winner | Group stage (Group B) | (Sweden) IK Sävehof | 34–21 | 30–24 | 1st |
| 2018–19 | EHF Cup; Winner | Group stage (Group B) | (Germany) TuS Metzingen | 32–25 | 33–26 | 1st |
| 2018–19 | EHF Cup; Winner | Group stage (Group B) | (Denmark) Herning-Ikast Håndbold | 25–21 | 34–22 | 1st |
| 2018–19 | EHF Cup; Winner | Quarter-finals | (Norway) Storhamar | 32–31 | 31–24 | 63–55 |
| 2018–19 | EHF Cup; Winner | Semi-finals | (Denmark) Viborg HK | 28–24 | 25–27 | 53–51 |
| 2018–19 | EHF Cup; Winner | Finals | (Denmark) Team Esbjerg | 26–21 | 21–21 | 47–42 |
| 2019–20 | EHF Cup | Third qualifying round | (France) Nantes Loire Atlantique HB | 29–34 | 32–24 | 61–58 |
| 2019–20 | EHF Cup | Group stage (Group B) | (Croatia) RK Podravka Koprivnica | 30–30 | 33–33 | 1st |
| 2019–20 | EHF Cup | Group stage (Group B) | (Romania) CS Măgura Cisnădie | 34–22 | 31–23 | 1st |
| 2019–20 | EHF Cup | Group stage (Group B) | (Denmark) København Håndbold | 36–23 | 28–27 | 1st |
| 2019–20 | EHF Cup | Quarter-finals | (Turkey) Kastamonu Bld. GSK | 40–20 | 38–29 | 78–49 |
| 2019–20 | EHF Cup | Semi-final | (Denmark) Odense Håndbold | Cancelled | | |
| 2020–21 | EHF European League | Group stage (Group D) | (Romania) HC Dunărea Brăila | 31–24 | 27–25 | 1st |
| 2020–21 | EHF European League | Group stage (Group D) | (Russia) Kuban Krasnodar | 28–28 | 31–25 | 1st |
| 2020–21 | EHF European League | Group stage (Group D) | (France) Fleury Loiret | 29–28 | 35–24 | 1st |
| 2020–21 | EHF European League | Quarter-finals | (Russia) HC Astrakhanochka | 32–26 | 29–28 | 61–54 |
| 2020–21 | EHF European League | Semi-final | (Denmark) Herning-Ikast | 36–34 | | |
| 2020–21 | EHF European League | Final | (France) Nantes Loire Atlantique HB | 31–36 | | |
| 2022–23 | EHF European League | Second qualifying round | (Poland) MKS FunFloor Perła Lublin | 31–32 | 27–18 | 58–50 |
| 2022–23 | EHF European League | Third qualifying round | (Romania) CS Măgura Cisnădie | 33–24 | 28–28 | 61–52 |
| 2022–23 | EHF European League | Group stage (Group A) | (Norway) Molde Elite | 30–22 | 32–29 | 2nd |
| 2022–23 | EHF European League | Group stage (Group A) | (France) ESBF Besançon | 20–18 | 21–30 | 2nd |
| 2022–23 | EHF European League | Group stage (Group A) | (Germany) Borussia Dortmund | 27–24 | 23–26 | 2nd |
| 2022–23 | EHF European League | Quarter-finals | (Denmark) Ikast Håndbold | 20–30 | 21–31 | 41–61 |

Statistics: matches played: 58 – wins: 41 – draws: 5 – losses: 12 – goals scored: 1,728 – goals conceded: 1,483
