= Anikó Szamoránsky =

Hungarian handball player (born 1986)

Personal information
- Full name: Anikó Szamoránsky
- Nationality: Hungarian
- Born: 9 July 1986 (age 40) Győr, Hungary
- Height: 1.71 m (5 ft 7 in)

Sport
- Sport: Handball
- Position: Line Player
- Current club: Szent István SE

Youth career
- Years: Team
- –2005: Győri ETO KC

Senior clubs
- Years: Team
- 2005–2011: Ferencvárosi TC
- 2011–2013: Kiskunhalas NKSE
- 2013–2014: Siófok KC
- 2014–2016: Budaörs Handball
- 2016–2017: Csurgói NKC
- 2017–: Szent István SE

Anikó Szamoránsky (born 9 July 1986 in Győr) is a Hungarian handball player who currently plays for Szent István SE in the Hungarian second division handball league.

== Personal ==
She has a twin sister, Piroska, who is also a professional handballer and plays as a line player.

== Achievements ==
- Nemzeti Bajnokság I:
  - Winner: 2007
  - Silver Medallist: 2006, 2009
  - Bronze Medallist: 2008, 2011
- Magyar Kupa:
  - Silver Medallist: 2007
- EHF Cup:
  - Winner: 2006
- EHF Cup Winners' Cup:
  - Winner: 2011
  - Semifinalist: 2007
- EHF Champions Trophy:
  - Fourth Placed: 2006
