= Melinda Szikora =

Hungarian handball player (born 1988)

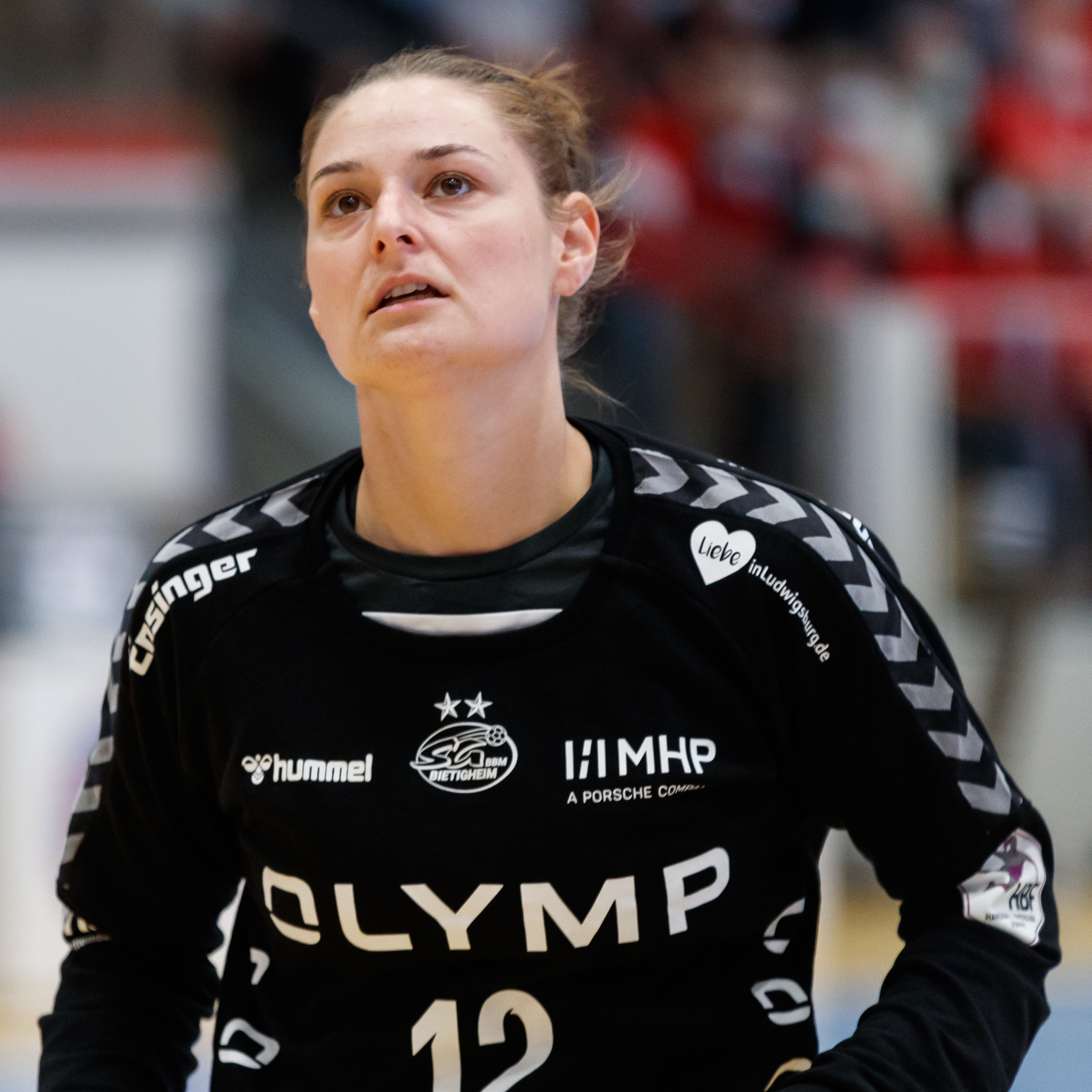

Personal information
- Nationality: Hungarian
- Born: 19 November 1988 (age 37) Kiskunfélegyháza, Hungary
- Height: 1.74 m (5 ft 9 in)

Sport
- Sport: Handball
- Position: Goalkeeper
- Current club: SG BBM Bietigheim
- Number: 12

Youth career
- Years: Team
- –2006: Ferencvárosi TC

Senior clubs
- Years: Team
- 2006–2008: Kiskunhalas NKSE
- 2008: → Tököl KSK (loan)
- 2008–2013: Alba Fehérvár KC
- 2013–2019: Ferencvárosi TC
- 2019–2021: Siófok KC
- 2021–2024: SG BBM Bietigheim
- 2024–: Chambray Touraine Handball
National team
Years	Team	Apps	(Gls)
2014–	Hungary	44	(1)

Melinda Szikora (born 19 November 1988) is a Hungarian handball goalkeeper playing for SG BBM Bietigheim.

== Achievements ==
- Hungarian Championship:
  - Gold Medallist: 2015
- Hungarian Cup:
  - Gold Medallist: 2017
  - Silver Medallist: 2014, 2015, 2019
  - Bronze Medallist: 2011, 2016, 2018
- EHF European League:
  - Winner: 2022
- Bundesliga:
  - Winner: 2022, 2023
