= Bernadett Bódi =

Hungarian handball player (born 1986)

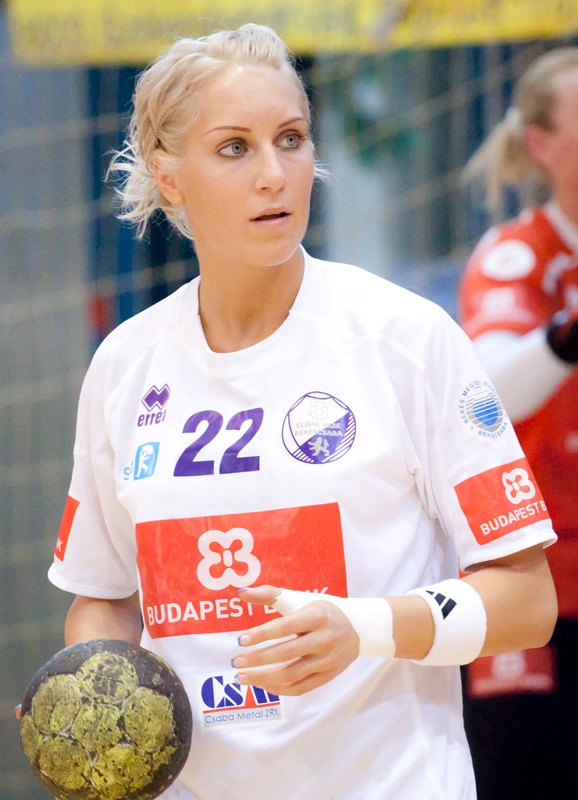

Personal information
- Nationality: Hungarian
- Born: 9 March 1986 (age 40) Szeged, Hungary
- Height: 1.75 m (5 ft 9 in)

Sport
- Sport: Handball
- Position: Right wing
- Current club: Moyra-Budaörs Handball

Senior clubs
- Years: Team
- 1999–2000: Szeged KKSE
- 2000–2001: Agro SE Orosháza
- 2001–2007: Győri ETO KC
- 2007–2009: Randers HK
- 2009–2011: Békéscsabai ENKSE
- 2011–2012: Siófok KC
- 2012–2013: Dunaújvárosi KKA
- 2013–2020: Győri ETO KC
- 2020–2021: Moyra-Budaörs Handball
- 2021–2022: Érd HC
- 2022–: Szent István SE
National team
Years	Team	Apps	(Gls)
2005–2018	Hungary	141	(263)
Medal record
European Championship
Bronze medal – third place	2012 Serbia
Junior World Championship
Silver medal – second place	2003 Macedonia
Junior European Championship
Silver medal – second place	2002 Finland

Bernadett Bódi (born 9 March 1986) is a Hungarian handballer.

She made her international debut on 2 March 2005 against Denmark. She competed at the 2008 Summer Olympics in Beijing, where the Hungarian team finished fourth, after losing 20–22 to Russia in the semifinal, and 28–33 to South Korea in the bronze match.

She also played in five European Championships (2008, 2010, 2012, 2014, 2016), and participated in the World Championship in 2009, 2013, 2015 and in 2017.

== Achievements ==
Domestic competitions

- Nemzeti Bajnokság I:
  - Winner: 2005, 2006, 2014, 2016, 2017, 2018, 2019
  - Silver Medallist: 2004, 2007, 2015
  - Bronze Medallist: 2002, 2003
- Magyar Kupa:
  - Winner: 2005, 2006, 2007, 2014, 2015, 2016, 2018, 2019
  - Silver Medallist: 2017
  - Bronze Medallist: 2010

European competitions

- Women's EHF Champions League:
  - Winner: 2014, 2017, 2018, 2019
  - Silver Medallist: 2016
- EHF Cup:
  - Finalist: 2002, 2004, 2005

National team

- Junior European Championship:
  - Silver Medallist: 2002
- Junior World Championship:
  - Silver Medallist: 2003
- European Championship:
  - Bronze Medalist: 2012
