= 2015–16 Magyar Kupa (women's handball) =

Hungarian women's handball season

Tournament details
- Country: Hungary
- Teams: 48

Final positions
- Champions: Győri Audi ETO KC (12th title)
- Runners-up: Érd

The 2015–16 Magyar Kupa, known as (Hungarian: Tippmix Török Bódog női Magyar Kupa) for sponsorship reasons, was the 58th edition of the tournament.

== Participating teams ==
The following 48 teams qualified for the competition:

Enter in Round 4	Enter in Round 3		Enter in Round 2			Enter in preliminary round
2014-15 NB I 1-4 teams	2014–15 NB I 5-10 teams	2014-15 NB I/B; Winners of 2 groups	2014–15 NB I 11-12 teams			
FTC-Rail Cargo Hungaria; Győri Audi ETO KC; Érd; Dunaújvárosi Kohász KA	Siófok KTC KFT; FKC; DVSC-TvP; EUbility Group Békéscsaba; IPress Center-Vác; Mosonmagyaróvári KC SE	Gödi SE; Budaörsi KC	MTK Budapest; Szeged KKSE	HUFBAU-AKKER KNKSE; Vasas SC; Nyíradony VVTK; Eszterházy KFSC; ELIOS Kispest NKK; Hajdúnánás SK; OXXO Energy Orosházi NKC; Inárcs-Örkény KC; Szent István SE; Kézilabda Szeged SE	Szekszárdi FGKC; Mohácsi TE; Pénzügyőr SE; Rinyamenti KC; Marcali VSZSE; Pilisvörösvári TKSK; PEAC	

=== Map ===
Locations of the 2015–16 Magyar Kupa (women's handball) clubs

Budapest teams	Szeged teams	Győr teams
Ferencvárosi TC; MTK Budapest; Vasas SC; Kispest NKK; Pénzügyőr SE; Szent István SE	Szeged KKSE; Kézilabda Szeged SE	Győri Audi ETO KC; VKLSE Győr

== Schedule ==
The rounds of the 2015–16 competition are scheduled as follows:

Round	Draw date and time	Matches
Round 1	6 August 2015, 13:00 CEST	23 September 2015
Round 2	29 September 2015, 13:00 CEST	14 October 2015
Round 3	22 October 2015, 13:30 CEST	11 November 2015
Round 4	19 November 2015, 11:00 CET	27 January 2016
Quarter-finals	28 January 2016, 11:15 CET	10 February 2016
Final four	18 February 2016, 11:00 CET	30 April–1 May 2016 in Szigetszentmiklós

== Matches ==
A total of 48 matches will take place, starting with Round 1 on 22 September 2015 and culminating with the final on 1 May 2016 at the Városi Sportcsarnok in Szigetszentmiklós.

=== Round 1 ===
The first round ties are scheduled for 22–23 September 2015.

Team 1	Score	Team 2
22 September
Inárcs-Örkény KC (I/B)	29–22	Szentendrei NKE (I/B)
23 September
K. Szeged SE (I/B)	15–32	Szeged KKSE (I/B)
Szigetszentmiklósi NKSE (II)	23–39	Szent István SE (I/B)
Gyömrő VSK (II)	34–25	HUFBAU-AKKER KNKSE (I/B)

=== Round 2 ===
The second round ties are scheduled for 7–14 October 2015.

Team 1	Score	Team 2
7 October
Kozma Szerszám-Sz.helyi KKA (II)	39–24	VKLSE Győr (I/B)
Hajdúnánás SK (I/B)	33–31	Nyíradony VVTK (I/B)
8 October
Gárdony-Pázmánd NKSE (II)	22–19	Lajosmizsei UKC (II)
Hajdúböszörményi TE (II)	20–39	Kisvárdai KC (I/B)
9 October
PEAC (II)	26–35	Rinyamenti KC (I/B)
Hévizi SK (II)	18–38	Kozármisleny SE (I/B)
Dorogi ESE (II)	24–29	Szent István SE (I/B)
11 October
Pénzügyőr SE (I/B)	26–26	Inárcs-Örkény KC (I/B)
Mohácsi TE (I/B)	24–31	NEKA (I/B)
13 October
Füzesabonyi Sport Club (I/B)	29–36	Eszterházy KFSC (I/B)
Tolna KC (II)	15–34	Szekszárdi FGKC (I/B)
14 October
Csurgói NKC (II)	25–25 (a)	Marcali VSZSE (I/B)
Vasas SC (I/B)	18–22	MTK Budapest (I)
Pilisvörösvári TKSK (II)	30–21	VSK Tököl (II)
Gyömrő VSK (II)	17–34	ELIOS Kispest NKK (I/B)
Szeged KKSE (I/B)	36–25	OXXO Energy Orosházi NKC (I/B)

=== Round 3 ===
The third round ties are scheduled for 4–11 November 2015.

Team 1	Score	Team 2
4 November
Kisvárdai KC (I/B)	21–34	EUbility Group Békéscsaba (I)
10 November
Inárcs-Örkény KC (I/B)	19–30	FKC (I)
Hajdúnánás SK (I/B)	29–30	Eszterházy KFSC (I/B)
11 November
Szeged KKSE (I/B)	21–29	DVSC-TvP (I)
ELIOS Kispest NKK (I/B)	30–37	IPress Center-Vác (I)
Kozma Szerszám-Szombathelyi KKA (II)	26–34	Mosonmagyaróvári KC SE (I)
Csurgói NKC (II)	23–22	Szekszárdi FGKC (I/B)
Kozármisleny SE (I/B)	24–31	NEKA (I/B)
Rinyamenti KC (I/B)	27–37	Siófok KTC KFT (I)
Pilisvörösvári TKSK (II)	30–23	Gárdony-Pázmánd NKSE (II)
Szent István SE (I/B)	29–38	MTK Budapest (I)
Gödi SE (I/B)	23–33	Budaörs (I)

=== Round 4 ===
The fourth round ties are scheduled for 11 December 2015 – 27 January 2016.

Team 1	Score	Team 2
11 December
Pilisvörösvári TKSK (II)	25–43	EUbility Group Békéscsaba (I)
27 January
Mosonmagyaróvári KC SE (I)	20–25	FKC (I)
Eszterházy KFSC (I/B)	27–30	MTK Budapest (I)
DVSC-TvP (I)	28–28 (a)	IPress Center-Vác (I)
Csurgói NKC (II)	16–29	Érd (I)
NEKA (I/B)	26–27	Siófok KTC KFT (I)
Győri Audi ETO KC (I)	34–19	Dunaújvárosi Kohász KA (I)
Budaörs (I)	10–45	FTC-Rail Cargo Hungária (I)

=== Quarter-finals (Round 5) ===
The quarterfinals ties are scheduled for 10 February 2016.

Team 1	Score	Team 2
10 February
Győri Audi ETO KC (I)	29–21	IPress Center-Vác (I)
Siófok KTC KFT (I)	22–26	FTC-Rail Cargo Hungária (I)
MTK Budapest (I)	26–27	Érd (I)
12 February
EUbility Group Békéscsaba (I)	27–27 (a)	FKC (I)

=== Final four ===
The final four will be held on 30 April and 1 May 2016 at the Városi Sportcsarnok in Szigetszentmiklós.

Semi-finals
30 April, 12:15
Győri Audi ETO KC	25
FTC-Rail Cargo Hungária	24
30 April, 14:30
Fehérvár KC	23
Érd	25

Final
1 May, 18:00
Győri Audi ETO KC	33
Érd	27
Third place
1 May, 15:45
FTC-Rail Cargo Hungária	40
Fehérvár KC	19

==== Awards ====
- MVP: (Hungary) Kinga Klivinyi (Érd)
- Best Goalkeeper: (Norway) Kari Aalvik Grimsbø (Győri Audi ETO KC)

Semi-finals

30 April; 12:15	Győri Audi ETO KC	25 – 24	FTC-Rail Cargo Hungária	Városi Sportcsarnok, Szigetszentmiklós; Attendance: 1,000; Referees: Andorka, Hucker
30 April; 12:15	Løke, Görbicz 6	(15–11)	Pena 6	Városi Sportcsarnok, Szigetszentmiklós; Attendance: 1,000; Referees: Andorka, Hucker
30 April; 12:15	2× (yellow card) 4× (suspension) 1× (red card)	Report	3× (yellow card) 5× (suspension)	Városi Sportcsarnok, Szigetszentmiklós; Attendance: 1,000; Referees: Andorka, Hucker

30 April; 14:30	Fehérvár KC	23 – 25	Érd	Városi Sportcsarnok, Szigetszentmiklós; Attendance: 800; Referees: Hargitai, Markó
30 April; 14:30	Tápai 6	(12–16)	Krpež-Slezak 9	Városi Sportcsarnok, Szigetszentmiklós; Attendance: 800; Referees: Hargitai, Markó
30 April; 14:30	3× (yellow card) 6× (suspension)	Report	2× (yellow card) 4× (suspension)	Városi Sportcsarnok, Szigetszentmiklós; Attendance: 800; Referees: Hargitai, Markó

Third place

1 May; 15:45	FTC-Rail Cargo Hungária	40 – 19	Fehérvár KC	Városi Sportcsarnok, Szigetszentmiklós; Attendance: 1,000; Referees: Haraszti, Nachtmann
1 May; 15:45	Szöllősi-Zácsik 10	(20–9)	Utasi, Ishitate 3	Városi Sportcsarnok, Szigetszentmiklós; Attendance: 1,000; Referees: Haraszti, Nachtmann
1 May; 15:45	3× (yellow card) 3× (suspension)	Report	1× (yellow card) 1× (suspension)	Városi Sportcsarnok, Szigetszentmiklós; Attendance: 1,000; Referees: Haraszti, Nachtmann

Final

1 May; 18:00	Győri Audi ETO KC	33 – 27	Érd	Városi Sportcsarnok, Szigetszentmiklós; Attendance: 1,400; Referees: Bacs, Bóna
1 May; 18:00	Görbicz 9	(16–12)	Krpež-Slezak, González 8	Városi Sportcsarnok, Szigetszentmiklós; Attendance: 1,400; Referees: Bacs, Bóna
1 May; 18:00	3× (yellow card) 7× (suspension)	Report	3× (yellow card) 6× (suspension)	Városi Sportcsarnok, Szigetszentmiklós; Attendance: 1,400; Referees: Bacs, Bóna

2015-16 Magyar Kupa
Winner

Győri Audi ETO KC
12th Title

Kari Aalvik Grimsbø, Éva Kiss, Ida Alstad, Eduarda Amorim, Yvette Broch, Cornelia Groot, Anita Görbicz (c), Júlia Harsfalvi, Jana Knedlíková, Anikó Kovacsics, Rita Lakatos, Heidi Løke, Adrienn Orbán, Linn Jørum Sulland
Head coach
Ambros Martín

==== Final standings ====
	Team
Gold medal	Győri Audi ETO KC
Silver medal	Érd
Bronze medal	FTC-Rail Cargo Hungária
	Fehérvár KC

== See also ==
- 2015–16 Nemzeti Bajnokság I
