= 2012–13 Nemzeti Bajnokság I (women's handball) =

- League: Nemzeti Bajnokság I
- Sport: Team handball
- Duration: 31 August 2012 – 4 May 2013

Regular season
- Top scorer: Annamária Bogdanović (HUN) (156 goals)

Playoffs
- NB I champions: Győri ETO KC
- NB I runners-up: Ferencvárosi TC

Nemzeti Bajnokság I seasons
- ← 2011–12 2013–14 →

The 2012–13 Nemzeti Bajnokság I was the sixty-second edition of the top level championship in the Hungarian team handball for women. The regular season began on 31 August 2012 and concluded on 31 March 2013, followed by the classification rounds and the playoff finals.

Defending champions Győri ETO KC won the regular season with an almost perfect performance: 21 victories on 22 games and only one draw against their rival Ferencvárosi TC, last season's runners-up. This year's final also confronted Győr to Ferencváros, after both teams had easily won their semi-finals against Váci NKSE and Érd NK. Unlike last season's final, Ferencváros did not challenge the eventual champion as Győr won both legs by six and seventeen goals and so became Hungarian champion for the tenth time.

== Overview ==
Locations of the 2011–12 Nemzeti Bajnokság I teams

=== Teams ===
This year, twelve teams competed in the championship: eleven clubs from the past season and only one promoted team from the second division, Budapest SE, the winner of the Eastern group. It was the first time that this club had played in the elite. As per the previous edition, the winner of the Western group, Mohácsi TE announced that they didn't want to be promoted. As a result, last season's eleventh placed Kiskunhalas NKSE escaped relegation and stayed in the first division.

The league comprised two teams from the capital Budapest (Ferencváros and BSE); two clubs from Central Hungary (Érd and Vác); two from the Southern Great Plain (Békéscsaba and Kiskunhalas); three from Central Transdanubia (Veszprém, Fehérvár, Dunaújváros) and only one team from Western Transdanubia (Győr) and the Northern Great Plain (DVSC).

As Hungarian champion, Győri Audi ETO KC entered the group phase of the EHF Champions League while EHF Cup Winners' Cup's winner FTC-Rail Cargo Hungaria also reached the Top 16 after beating IUVENTA Michalovce in the qualification round. Third and fourth placed Siófok KC and Érdi VSE played in the EHF Cup. It was the first participation in a European Cup for either team. Finally, the runner-up and the bronze medallist of the Hungarian Cup, Váci NSKE and Békéscsabai ENKSE, competed in the EHF Cup Winners' Cup.

=== Arenas and locations ===
Team	Location	Arena	Capacity
Budapest Bank-Békéscsabai ENKSE	Békéscsaba	Városi Sportcsarnok	2,300
Budapest SE	Vizafogó, Budapest	Elektromos Sportcsarnok	600
Dunaújvárosi Kohász KA	Dunaújváros	Dunaújvárosi Sportcsarnok	1,200
DVSC-Fórum	Debrecen	Hódos Imre Sportcsarnok	1,800
ÉTV-Érdi VSE	Érd	Batthyány Tornacsarnok	500
Fehérvár KC	Székesfehérvár	Köfém Sportcsarnok	1,200
FTC-Rail Cargo Hungaria	Ferencváros, Budapest	Elek Gyula Aréna	1,300
Győri Audi ETO KC	Győr	Magvassy Mihály Sportcsarnok	2,800
Kiskunhalas NKSE	Kiskunhalas	Vári Szabó István Sportcsarnok	500
Siófok KC-Galerius Fürdő	Siófok	Beszédes József Sportcsarnok	550
Váci NKSE	Vác	Városi Sportcsarnok	1,200
Veszprém Barabás Duna Takarék KC	Veszprém	Március 15. úti Sportcsarnok	2,500

== Regular season ==
=== Results ===
Home \ Away	BÉK	BSE	DUN	DEB	ÉRD	FKC	FTC	GYŐ	KIS	SIÓ	VÁC	VKC
Budapest Bank-Békéscsabai ENKSE		23–22	25–26	21–21	24–28	24–25	25–28	18–35	24–28	31–23	25–26	31–27
Budapest SE	25–27		26–28	29–30	24–33	28–26	22–36	21–37	33–37	20–25	20–26	23–23
Dunaújvárosi Kohász KA	30–32	31–24		34–34	27–27	18–21	31–31	23–40	24–32	37–29	31–31	31–25
DVSC-Fórum	23–28	24–24	28–30		28–28	24–25	24–30	24–30	23–33	29–24	30–32	19–23
ÉTV-Érdi VSE	30–17	30–20	33–27	36–16		21–24	24–22	19–28	34–22	36–21	24–25	27–22
Fehérvár KC	31–23	38–24	29–19	30–25	26–24		21–30	17–30	30–26	25–28	31–25	28–25
FTC-Rail Cargo Hungaria	39–22	40–25	39–33	39–28	37–29	39–24		34–34	37–26	42–29	35–26	33–26
Győri Audi ETO KC	29–14	34–20	34–22	38–23	29–18	37–13	36–28		34–18	37–18	32–15	37–21
Kiskunhalas NKSE	35–25	35–23	29–21	29–23	21–25	27–24	27–35	17–33		31–30	24–24	22–20
Siófok KC-Galerius Fürdő	33–24	30–25	31–24	28–19	27–34	25–28	35–43	22–30	32–29		30–31	24–25
Váci NKSE	31–23	33–26	29–22	26–22	28–33	33–19	25–27	26–28	32–30	26–24		32–17
Veszprém Barabás Duna Takarék KC	30–29	26–22	33–28	30–22	24–33	28–27	31–34	19–37	25–38	26–22	29–27	

Legend: Blue = home team win; Yellow = draw; Red = away team win.

=== League table ===
Pos	Team	Pld	W	D	L	GF	GA	GD	Pts	Qualification
1	Győri Audi ETO KC	22	21	1	0	739	450	+289	43	Qualified for the Play-off Round
2	FTC-Rail Cargo Hungaria	22	18	2	2	758	603	+155	38	Qualified for the Play-off Round
3	ÉTV-Érdi VSE	22	13	2	7	616	539	+77	28	Qualified for the Play-off Round
4	Váci NKSE	22	13	2	7	609	582	+27	28	Qualified for the Play-off Round
5	Fehérvár KC	22	13	0	9	562	583	−21	26	Qualified for the Classification Round 5–8
6	Kiskunhalas NKSE	22	12	1	9	616	611	+5	25	Qualified for the Classification Round 5–8
7	Veszprém Barabás Duna Takarék KC	22	10	1	11	555	616	−61	21	Qualified for the Classification Round 5–8
8	Dunaújvárosi Kohász KA	22	6	4	12	597	662	−65	16	Qualified for the Classification Round 5–8
9	Siófok KC-Galerius Fürdő	22	7	0	15	590	652	−62	14	Qualified for the Classification Round 9–12
10	Budapest Bank-Békéscsabai ENKSE	22	6	1	15	535	625	−90	13	Qualified for the Classification Round 9–12
11	DVSC-Fórum	22	2	4	16	539	647	−108	8	Qualified for the Classification Round 9–12
12	Budapest SE	22	1	2	19	526	672	−146	4	Qualified for the Classification Round 9–12

=== Individual statistics ===
==== Top scorers ====
Rank	Player	Club	Matches	Goals
1	(Hungary) Annamária Bogdanović	Siófok	22	156
2	(Ukraine) Olha Nikolayenko	Békéscsaba	22	144
3	(Hungary) Bernadett Bódi	Siófok	21	143
4	(Hungary) Bernadett Ferling	Dunaújváros	22	141
5	(Hungary) Szimonetta Planéta	Veszprém	22	124
6	(Hungary) Tamara Tilinger	Fehérvár	22	118
7	(Hungary) Ildikó Erdősi	Siófok	22	115
8	(Hungary) Zsuzsanna Tomori	Ferencváros	21	114
9	(Hungary) Kinga Klivinyi	Vác	18	111
10	(Hungary) Bozsana Fekete	Budapest SE	22	110

=== Team statistics ===
==== Overall ====
- Most wins – Győri Audi ETO KC (21)
- Fewest wins – Budapest SE (1)
- Most losses – Budapest SE (19)
- Fewest losses – Győri Audi ETO KC (0)
- Most goals scored – FTC-Rail Cargo Hungaria (758)
- Fewest goals scored – Budapest SE (526)
- Most goals conceded – Budapest SE (672)
- Fewest goals conceded – Győri Audi ETO KC (450)
- Best goal difference – Győri Audi ETO KC (+289)
- Worst goal difference – Budapest SE (–146)

==== Home ====
- Most wins – Győri Audi ETO KC (11)
- Fewest wins – Budapest SE and DVSC-Fórum (1)
- Most losses – Budapest SE (9)
- Fewest losses – Győri Audi ETO KC (0)
- Most goals scored – FTC-Rail Cargo Hungaria (414)
- Fewest goals scored – Budapest SE and Budapest Bank-Békéscsabai ENKSE (271)
- Most goals conceded – Budapest SE (328)
- Fewest goals conceded – Győri Audi ETO KC (210)

==== Away ====
- Most wins – Győri Audi ETO KC (10)
- Fewest wins – Budapest SE and DVSC-Fórum (0)
- Most losses – Budapest SE (10)
- Fewest losses – Győri Audi ETO KC (0)
- Most goals scored – Győri Audi ETO KC (362)
- Fewest goals scored – Veszprém Barabás Duna Takarék KC (254)
- Most goals conceded – DVSC-Fórum (350)
- Fewest goals conceded – Győri Audi ETO KC (240)

==== Scoring ====
- Widest winning margin: 19 goals –
  - Győri Audi ETO KC 37–18 Siófok KC-Galerius Fürdő (19 January 2013)
- Most goals in a match: 78 goals –
  - Siófok KC-Galerius Fürdő 35–43 FTC-Rail Cargo Hungaria (26 January 2013)
- Fewest goals in a match: 39 goals –
  - Dunaújvárosi Kohász KA 18–21 Fehérvár KC (1 March 2013)
- Most goals scored by losing team: 35 goals –
  - Siófok KC-Galerius Fürdő 35–43 FTC-Rail Cargo Hungaria (26 January 2013)
- Most goals scored in a match by one player: 14 goals –
  - Annamária Bogdanović for Siófok KC-Galerius Fürdő against Váci NKSE (7 November 2012)
  - Zsuzsanna Tomori for FTC-Rail Cargo Hungaria against Győri Audi ETO KC (7 November 2012)

== Postseason ==
=== Classification round 9–12 ===
Teams finishing in bottom four places at the close of the regular season entered a classification round, for which a double round-robin system was used. According to their final position in the regular season, these four teams were awarded bonus points. Ninth placed Siófok got four points, tenth placed Békéscsaba received three points, eleventh placed Debrecen got two points and finally last placed BSE were awarded only one point.

Home \ Away	SIÓ	BÉK	DEB	BSE
Siófok KC-Galerius Fürdő		32–23	29–26	34–26
Budapest Bank-Békéscsabai ENKSE	23–21		29–20	33–25
DVSC-Fórum	26–24	30–31		32–28
Budapest SE	24–28	26–33	23–19	

Legend: Blue = home team win; Yellow = draw; Red = away team win.

Pos	Team	Pld	W	D	L	GF	GA	GD	BP	Pts
1	Budapest Bank-Békéscsabai ENKSE	6	5	0	1	172	154	+18	3	13
2	Siófok KC-Galerius Fürdő	6	4	0	2	168	148	+20	4	12
3	DVSC-Fórum	6	2	0	4	153	164	−11	2	6
4	Budapest SE	6	1	0	5	152	179	−27	1	3

Updated to match(es) played on unknown. Source:

Additional points that were awarded after the final positions in the regular season are indicated in the bonus points column.

=== Classification round 5–8 ===
Teams finished between fifth and eight place also played a play off round. Similarly to the bottom four Classification Round, these four teams were given points depending on their final placement in the regular season.

Home \ Away	FKC	KIS	VKC	DUN
Fehérvár KC		25–26	27–24	32–29
Kiskunhalas NKSE	21–27		31–30	33–24
Veszprém Barabás Duna Takarék	23–20	28–25		34–25
Dunaújvárosi Kohász KA	23–27	36–33	31–24	

Legend: Blue = home team win; Yellow = draw; Red = away team win.

Pos	Team	Pld	W	D	L	GF	GA	GD	BP	Pts
1	Fehérvár KC	6	4	0	2	158	146	+12	4	12
2	Kiskunhalas NKSE	6	3	0	3	169	170	−1	3	9
3	Veszprém Barabás Duna Takarék KC	6	3	0	3	163	159	+4	2	8
4	Dunaújvárosi Kohász KA	6	2	0	4	168	183	−15	1	5

Additional points that were awarded after the final positions in the regular season are indicated in bonus points column.

=== Championship playoff ===
==== Bracket ====
Semifinals
Győri Audi ETO KC	2
Váci NKSE	0
FTC-Rail Cargo Hungaria	2
ÉTV-Érdi VSE	0

Finals
Győri Audi ETO KC	2
FTC-Rail Cargo Hungaria	0
Third place playoffs
ÉTV-Érdi VSE	2
Váci NKSE	1

==== Semi-finals ====
===== Győri Audi ETO KC vs. Váci NKSE =====
2 April 2013; 18:00	Győri Audi ETO KC	39–16	Váci NKSE	Magvassy Mihály Sportcsarnok, Győr; Attendance: 1,000; Referees: Bacs, Bán
2 April 2013; 18:00	Hornyák 7	(19-6)	Virág, Klivinyi 3	Magvassy Mihály Sportcsarnok, Győr; Attendance: 1,000; Referees: Bacs, Bán
2 April 2013; 18:00	2× (yellow card) 1× (suspension)	Report	3× (yellow card) 2× (suspension)	Magvassy Mihály Sportcsarnok, Győr; Attendance: 1,000; Referees: Bacs, Bán

16 April 2013; 18:00	Váci NKSE	20–30	Győri Audi ETO KC	Városi Sportcsarnok, Vác; Attendance: 700; Referees: Andorka, Hucker
16 April 2013; 18:00	Klivinyi 9	(8-16)	Orbán 5	Városi Sportcsarnok, Vác; Attendance: 700; Referees: Andorka, Hucker
16 April 2013; 18:00	2× (yellow card) 4× (suspension)	Report	2× (yellow card) 2× (suspension)	Városi Sportcsarnok, Vác; Attendance: 700; Referees: Andorka, Hucker

Győri Audi ETO KC won series 2–0

===== FTC-Rail Cargo Hungaria vs. ÉTV-Érdi VSE =====
6 April 2013; 12:35	FTC-Rail Cargo Hungaria	31–23	ÉTV-Érdi VSE	Főtáv-FTC Kézilabda Aréna, Budapest; Attendance: 800; Referees: Medve, Nagy
6 April 2013; 12:35	Szucsánszki 9	(13-10)	Wolf 5	Főtáv-FTC Kézilabda Aréna, Budapest; Attendance: 800; Referees: Medve, Nagy
6 April 2013; 12:35	1× (yellow card) 3× (suspension)	Report	2× (yellow card) 1× (suspension)	Főtáv-FTC Kézilabda Aréna, Budapest; Attendance: 800; Referees: Medve, Nagy

13 April 2013; 18:00	ÉTV-Érdi VSE	29–34	FTC-Rail Cargo Hungaria	Batthyány Tornacsarnok, Érd; Attendance: 350; Referees: Bonifert, Oláh
13 April 2013; 18:00	Wolf, Elez 6	(14-18)	Szucsánszki, Tomori 10	Batthyány Tornacsarnok, Érd; Attendance: 350; Referees: Bonifert, Oláh
13 April 2013; 18:00	3× (yellow card) 3× (suspension)	Report	3× (yellow card) 4× (suspension)	Batthyány Tornacsarnok, Érd; Attendance: 350; Referees: Bonifert, Oláh

FTC-Rail Cargo Hungaria won series 2–0

==== Third place playoffs ====
20 April 2013; 18:00	ÉTV-Érdi VSE	27–23	Váci NKSE	Batthyány Tornacsarnok, Érd; Attendance: 350; Referees: Baranyi, Szloska
20 April 2013; 18:00	Kovács 7	(17-12)	Klivinyi 7	Batthyány Tornacsarnok, Érd; Attendance: 350; Referees: Baranyi, Szloska
20 April 2013; 18:00	3× (yellow card) 3× (suspension)	Report	3× (yellow card) 2× (suspension)	Batthyány Tornacsarnok, Érd; Attendance: 350; Referees: Baranyi, Szloska

27 April 2013; 12:50	Váci NKSE	24–20	ÉTV-Érdi VSE	Városi Sportcsarnok, Vác; Attendance: 600; Referees: Medve, Nagy
27 April 2013; 12:50	Barján, Klivinyi 6	(10-10)	Elez 5	Városi Sportcsarnok, Vác; Attendance: 600; Referees: Medve, Nagy
27 April 2013; 12:50	3× (yellow card) 3× (suspension)	Report	2× (yellow card) 5× (suspension)	Városi Sportcsarnok, Vác; Attendance: 600; Referees: Medve, Nagy

4 May 2013; 18:00	ÉTV-Érdi VSE	25–21	Váci NKSE	Batthyány Tornacsarnok, Érd; Attendance: 350; Referees: Pech, Vágvölgyi
4 May 2013; 18:00	Wolf 8	(11-12)	Klivinyi 4	Batthyány Tornacsarnok, Érd; Attendance: 350; Referees: Pech, Vágvölgyi
4 May 2013; 18:00	3× (yellow card) 2× (suspension)	Report	3× (yellow card) 4× (suspension)	Batthyány Tornacsarnok, Érd; Attendance: 350; Referees: Pech, Vágvölgyi

ÉTV-Érdi VSE won series 2–1

==== Finals ====
20 April 2013; 16:30	Győri Audi ETO KC	34–28	FTC-Rail Cargo Hungaria	Magvassy Mihály Sportcsarnok, Győr; Attendance: 1,800; Referees: Horváth, Marton
20 April 2013; 16:30	Görbicz 9	(20-13)	Tomori 8	Magvassy Mihály Sportcsarnok, Győr; Attendance: 1,800; Referees: Horváth, Marton
20 April 2013; 16:30	3× (yellow card) 2× (suspension)	Report	3× (yellow card) 3× (suspension)	Magvassy Mihály Sportcsarnok, Győr; Attendance: 1,800; Referees: Horváth, Marton

24 April 2013; 19:00	FTC-Rail Cargo Hungaria	19–34	Győri Audi ETO KC	Főtáv-FTC Kézilabda Aréna, Budapest; Attendance: 1,100; Referees: Dobrovits, Tájok
24 April 2013; 19:00	Szarka 6	(11-12)	Orbán 8	Főtáv-FTC Kézilabda Aréna, Budapest; Attendance: 1,100; Referees: Dobrovits, Tájok
24 April 2013; 19:00	3× (yellow card) 1× (suspension)	Report	2× (yellow card) 3× (suspension)	Főtáv-FTC Kézilabda Aréna, Budapest; Attendance: 1,100; Referees: Dobrovits, Tájok

Győri Audi ETO KC won series 2–0

== Final standing ==
Rank	Team	Qualification or relegation
1	Győri Audi ETO KC	2013–14 EHF Champions League Group stage
2	FTC-Rail Cargo Hungaria	2013–14 EHF Champions League Second qualifying round
3	ÉTV-Érdi VSE	2013–14 EHF Champions League Second qualifying round^{1}
4	Váci NKSE	2013–14 EHF Cup
5	Fehérvár KC	2013–14 EHF Cup
6	Kiskunhalas NKSE^{2}	
7	Veszprém Barabás Duna Takarék KC	2013–14 EHF Cup Winners' Cup^{3}
8	Dunaújvárosi Kohász KA	
9	Budapest Bank-Békéscsabai ENKSE	
10	Siófok KC-Galerius Fürdő	
11	DVSC-Fórum^{4}	
12	Budapest SE^{5}	Relegation to the 2013–14 Nemzeti Bajnokság I/B

^{1} Since Győri Audi ETO KC won the 2012–2013 EHF Champions League, Hungary received a supplementary spot. ÉTV-Érdi VSE were given that place and could play the qualification round for the group phase.

^{2} Although finishing in sixth place, Kiskunhalas NKSE withdrew from the elite.

^{3} Since both 2012–2013 Magyar Kupa finalists Győri Audi ETO KC and FTC-Rail Cargo Hungaria qualified for the 2013–14 EHF Champions League Group Phase and Qualification Round, the EHF Cup Winners' Cup spot was passed to cup third Veszprém Barabás Duna Takarék KC.

^{4} Despite finishing in the relegation zone, DVSC-Fórum remained in the elite, because Mohácsi TE, winner of the Eastern Group of the second division, declined promotion to the Nemzeti Bajnokság I.

^{5} Because of Kiskunhals NKSE's withdrawal, Budapest SE could stay in the first division.

2012–13 Nemzeti Bajnokság I champions

Győri Audi ETO KC
Tenth title

Team roster

Eduarda Amorim, Anita Görbicz, Ana Gros, Orsolya Herr, Ágnes Hornyák, Dóra Hornyák, Dorina Korsós, Anikó Kovacsics, Andrea Lekić, Heidi Løke, Katrine Lunde Haraldsen, Adrienn Orbán, Jovanka Radičević, Nadine Schatzl, Viktória Rédei-Soós, Szederke Sirián, Ivett Szepesi and Raphaëlle Tervel.
Head coach: Ambros Martín.

== See also ==
- List of Hungarian women's handball transfers summer 2012
