= Alba Fehérvár KC =

Hungarian women's handball team

- Full name: Alba Fehérvár Kézilabda Club
- Short name: Fehérvár
- Founded: 1968; 58 years ago
- Arena: Köfém Sportcsarnok, Székesfehérvár
- Capacity: 1,000
- President: Imre Balássi
- Head coach: Suzana Lazovic
- League: Nemzeti Bajnokság I
- 2021–22: Nemzeti Bajnokság I, 10th
- Club colours
Home	Away

Alba Fehérvár Kézilabda Club is a Hungarian women's handball team based in Székesfehérvár. Founded in 1968 by the merger of Máv Előre and VT Vasas, the club achieved their biggest success in 2005, when they were crowned of the EHF Cup winners, after beating domestic rivals Győri ETO KC in the finals. This is the first and so far the only major European title for the team.

Location of Alba Fehérvár KC

== Crest, colours, supporters ==
=== Naming history ===
- –1994: Alcoa Köfém SC
- 1994–1998: Cerbona SC
- 1998–1999: Cerbona-Alcoa SC
- 1999–2004: Cornexi-Alcoa
- 2004–2007: Cornexi-Alcoa-HSB Holding
- 2007–2009: Fehérép Alcoa FKC
- 2009–2010: Alcoa Fehérvár KC
- 2010–2011: Alcoa FKC RightPhone
- 2011–2012: Alcoa FKC
- 2012–2015: Fehérvár KC
- 2015–present: Alba Fehérvár KC

=== Kit manufacturers and Shirt sponsor ===
The following table shows in detail Fehérvár KC kit manufacturers and shirt sponsors by year:

Period	Kit manufacturer	Shirt sponsor
2002–2003	Diadora	Cornexi-Alcoa
2003–2005	Diadora	Cornexi-Alcoa / Fiat
2005–2006	Diadora	Cornexi-Alcoa HSB Holding
2006–2007	Puma	Cornexi-Alcoa HSB Holding / SPAR Natur*pur
2007–2008	H_{2}O	SPAR Natur*pur
2008–2009	H_{2}O	SPAR Natur*pur / Albatherm
2009–2010	H_{2}O	–
2010–2011	Erima	www.albacomp.hu
2011–2012		FKC / Székesfehérvár
2012–2013		double green / Székesfehérvár
2013–2014		WMS
2014–2015	hummel	Strabag
2015–	hummel	Avis

== Kits ==
HOME
2017–20	2020–

AWAY
2014–17	2017–19	2020–21	2021–

THIRD
2017–20	2020–

== Supporters and rivalries ==
The supporters of the club are based in Székesfehérvár, in western part and capital of Fejér County, Hungary.

- Fehérvár KC's arch-rival is the neighbouring club Dunaújvárosi Kohász KA and games between the clubs are considered as the "Fejér megyei derbi".

== Team ==
=== Current squad ===
Squad for the 2026–27 season

- Head coach: (Montenegro) Suzana Lazovic
- Assistant coach: (Hungary) Attila Kovács
- Goalkeeping coach: (Hungary) Péter Tatai
- Fittness coach: (Croatia) Alen Marosevic
- Masseur: (Hungary) Botond Bíró, László Bíró
- Physiotherapist: (Hungary) Hajnalka Horváth
- Sport director: (Hungary) Krisztina Triscsuk

Goalkeepers

- 1 (Hungary) Gréta Hadfi
- 16 (Spain) Maddi Aalla Rotaetxe

Left wingers

- 13 (Hungary) Beáta Bojtos
- 17 (Hungary) Viktória Takó

Right wingers

- 3 (Hungary) Krisztina Szabó-Májer
- 77 (Hungary) Dorka Kolonics
- 10 (China) Shi Zihan

Line players

- 76 (Hungary) Bettina Kocsis
- 7 (Hungary) Nikolett Dubán
- 48 (Hungary) Gyöngyvér Hajdu

Left backs

- 25 (Hungary) Bianka Kovalcsik
- 37 (Hungary) Réka Sulyok
- 98 (Portugal) Débora Solange Costa Moreno
- 5 (Serbia) Emilija Lazić
- 11 (China) Pang Fengying

Playmakers

- 18 (Hungary) Kitti Szabó-Freyberger
- 21 (Hungary) Lily Balássi (injured)
- 66 (Hungary) Dorottya Zentai
- 28 (China) Liu Xuedan

Right backs

- 24 (Croatia) Katarina Pavlović

=== Transfers ===
Transfers for the 2026–27 season

Joining

Leaving

- (Hungary) Sára Gergály (LB)
- (Hungary) Petra Stark (GK)
- (Montenegro) Nikolina Markovic (CB)

== Previous Squads ==
1995–1996 Team
Nationality	Player	Position
Hungary	Erika Lázár	Right winger
Hungary	Erika Gergely	Goalkeeper
Hungary	Gabriella Horváth	Right winger
Hungary	Mária Nagy	Central back
Hungary	Annamária Vas	Goalkeeper
Hungary	Zsuzsanna Vincze	Left winger
Hungary	Krisztina Básti	Left winger
Hungary	Anikó Birkás	Left back
Hungary	Ágnes Fábián	Line player
Hungary	Melinda Gabnai	Left back
Hungary	Éva Giron	Goalkeeper
Slovakia	Jytka Kissová	
Hungary	Gabriella Madár	Central back
Hungary	Edina Ráczné Horváth	Left back

2018–2019 Team
Shirt No	Nationality	Player	Birth Date	Position
1	Hungary	Eszter Vajk	7 December 2000 (age 25)	Goalkeeper
3	Hungary	Krisztina Májer	27 April 1995 (age 31)	Right Winger
4	Russia	Yana Zhilinskayte	6 March 1989 (age 37)	Line Player
8	France	Claudine Mendy	8 January 1990 (age 36)	Left Back
9	Russia	Olga Gorshenina	9 November 1990 (age 35)	Right Back
11	Hungary	Enikő Hudra	5 October 2000 (age 26)	Central Back
13	Hungary	Orsolya Pelczéder	2 May 1993 (age 33)	Left Winger
14	Hungary	Linda Utasi	19 June 2000 (age 26)	Left Back
17	Hungary	Sára Tornóczky	26 April 1999 (age 27)	Left Winger
21	Hungary	Kitty Mistina	13 January 1996 (age 30)	Goalkeeper
23	Hungary	Bianka Boldizsár	4 September 1996 (age 30)	Left Back
33	Brazil	Alexandra do Nascimento	16 September 1981 (age 45)	Right Winger
44	Hungary	Réka Sztankovics	1 July 1997 (age 29)	Line Player
73	Hungary	Kármen Piller	7 December 1999 (age 26)	Central Back
86	Hungary	Bernadett Temes	15 May 1986 (age 40)	Central Back
88	Hungary	Rebeka Györkös	22 November 1994 (age 31)	Goalkeeper
91	Hungary	Adrienn Szarka	28 June 1991 (age 35)	Left Winger
98	Hungary	Josephine Rózsás	27 May 1998 (age 28)	Central Back
99	Hungary	Emőke Varga	9 March 2000 (age 26)	Line Player

2016–2017 Team
Shirt No	Nationality	Player	Birth Date	Position
3	Hungary	Krisztina Májer	27 April 1995 (age 31)	Right Winger
5	Brazil	Daniela Piedade	2 March 1979 (age 47)	Line Player
6	Hungary	Renáta Rideg	8 April 1997 (age 29)	Line Player
7	Serbia	Jelena Živković-Lavko	6 July 1991 (age 35)	Right Back
8	France	Claudine Mendy	8 January 1990 (age 36)	Left Back
9	Hungary	Tamara Tilinger	14 February 1989 (age 37)	Central Back
11	Hungary	Enikő Hudra	5 October 2000 (age 26)	Central Back
12	Hungary	Orsolya Herr	23 November 1984 (age 41)	Goalkeeper
13	Hungary	Orsolya Pelczéder	2 May 1993 (age 33)	Left Winger
16	Hungary	Flóra Sipeki	4 April 1991 (age 35)	Goalkeeper
18	North Macedonia	Elena Gjeorgjievska	27 March 1990 (age 36)	Right Back
19	Hungary	Csenge Hajduch	3 October 1990 (age 36)	Right Back
20	Japan	Mayuko Ishitate	18 January 1987 (age 39)	Central Back
21	Serbia	Biljana Filipović-Bandelier	12 January 1986 (age 40)	Left Back
23	Hungary	Bianka Boldizsár	4 September 1996 (age 30)	Left Back
27	Hungary	Szabina Mayer	24 March 1988 (age 38)	Line Player
34	Hungary	Anita Kazai	28 May 1988 (age 38)	Left Winger
71	Montenegro	Bobana Klikovac	19 July 1995 (age 31)	Line Player
98	Hungary	Josephine Rózsás	27 May 1998 (age 28)	Central Back

2013–2014 Team
Shirt No	Nationality	Player	Birth Date	Position
2	Hungary	Fruzsina Azari	29 June 1989 (age 37)	Right Winger
3	Hungary	Krisztina Májer	27 April 1995 (age 31)	Right Winger
7	Hungary	Virág Vaszari	22 March 1986 (age 40)	Left Winger
9	Hungary	Tamara Tilinger	14 February 1989 (age 37)	Central Back
10	Hungary	Bernadett Horváth	10 May 1990 (age 36)	Line Player
15	Hungary	Kitti Becséri	8 January 1993 (age 33)	Central Back
16	Hungary	Brigitta Trimmel	29 June 1989 (age 37)	Goalkeeper
17	Hungary	Vivien Kuhinkó	20 July 1993 (age 33)	Central Back
19	Hungary	Csenge Hajduch	3 October 1990 (age 36)	Right Back
21	Hungary	Éva Kiss	10 July 1987 (age 39)	Goalkeeper
23	Hungary	Eszter Siti	12 November 1977 (age 48)	Central Back
25	Hungary	Anita Herr	25 January 1987 (age 39)	Right Back
27	Hungary	Szabina Mayer	24 March 1988 (age 38)	Line Player
29	Hungary	Alexandra Győrffy	29 March 1993 (age 33)	Goalkeeper
34	Hungary	Anita Kazai	28 May 1988 (age 38)	Left Winger
55	Hungary	Míra Emberovics	29 July 1988 (age 38)	Left Back
66	Spain	Nuria Benzal	3 April 1985 (age 41)	Central Back

2010–2011 Team
Shirt No	Nationality	Player	Birth Date	Position
1	Hungary	Fanni Cziráky	2 November 1991 (age 34)	Goalkeeper
1	Hungary	Nóra Dancs	18 June 1992 (age 34)	Goalkeeper
2	Hungary	Fruzsina Azari	29 June 1989 (age 37)	Right Winger
3	Hungary	Kitti Gazdag	25 March 1992 (age 34)	Left Winger
4	Slovakia	Boglárka Bízik	22 September 1989 (age 37)	Central Back
5	HungaryRussia	Krisztina Triscsuk	17 July 1985 (age 41)	Left Back
6	Hungary	Tímea Rádl	6 June 1986 (age 40)	Line Player
8	Hungary	Katalin Gorza	19 May 1993 (age 33)	Right Winger
9	Hungary	Tamara Tilinger	14 February 1989 (age 37)	Central Back
10	Hungary	Bernadett Horváth	10 May 1990 (age 36)	Line Player
11	Hungary	Vivien Zsigmond	22 April 1992 (age 34)	Right Back
12	Hungary	Melinda Szikora	19 November 1988 (age 37)	Goalkeeper
14	Hungary	Nóra Németh	26 March 1992 (age 34)	Left Winger
15	Hungary	Kitti Becséri	8 January 1993 (age 33)	Central Back
16	Hungary	Brigitta Trimmel	29 June 1989 (age 37)	Goalkeeper
18	Hungary	Vivien Kuhinkó	20 July 1993 (age 33)	Central Back
19	Hungary	Melinda Vincze	12 November 1983 (age 42)	Left Winger
20	Hungary	Noémi Lelkes	20 December 1989 (age 36)	Right Winger
71	Hungary	Krisztina Turcsányi	4 April 1990 (age 36)	Left Winger
77	Ukraine	Olha Vashchuk	13 August 1987 (age 39)	Right Back
83	Brazil	Ana Amorim	1 April 1983 (age 43)	Left Back

2005–2006 Team
Shirt No	Nationality	Player	Birth Date	Position
2	Hungary	Krisztina Csernus	14 June 1972 (age 54)	Line Player
3	Hungary	Olívia Kiss	7 October 1983 (age 43)	Line Player
4	Hungary	Szabina Tápai	30 January 1986 (age 40)	Central Back
5	Hungary	Andrea Lőw	20 December 1979 (age 46)	Left Winger
6	Russia	Elena Kordyuk	24 February 1977 (age 49)	Right Back
7	Hungary	Virág Vaszari	22 March 1986 (age 40)	Left Winger
8	Hungary	Katalin Varga	11 August 1988 (age 38)	Right Winger
9	Hungary	Tamara Tilinger	14 February 1989 (age 37)	Central Back
10	Hungary	Fanni Kenyeres	1 October 1978 (age 48)	Left Winger
11	Hungary	Valéria Szabó	2 March 1983 (age 43)	Line Player
12	Hungary	Tímea Sugár	21 October 1977 (age 49)	Goalkeeper
14	Hungary	Beáta Siti	23 September 1973 (age 53)	Central Back
15	Hungary	Edina Őri	8 November 1984 (age 41)	Left Back
16	Hungary	Brigitta Trimmel	29 June 1989 (age 37)	Goalkeeper
18	Hungary	Andrea Tápai	15 May 1987 (age 39)	Central Back
19	HungaryRussia	Krisztina Triscsuk	17 July 1985 (age 41)	Left Back
21	Hungary	Margit Pádár	21 May 1975 (age 51)	Left Back
23	Lithuania	Sonata Vijunaite	23 February 1980 (age 46)	Line Player
24	Hungary	Csilla Fekete	12 February 1980 (age 46)	Goalkeeper
25	Hungary	Beatrix Balogh	12 December 1974 (age 51)	Right Winger
77	Hungary	Nikolett Brigovácz	5 August 1977 (age 49)	Right Back

2004–2005 Team
Shirt No	Nationality	Player	Birth Date	Position
2	Hungary	Krisztina Csernus	14 June 1972 (age 54)	Line Player
3	Hungary	Katalin Tóth	25 June 1984 (age 42)	Line Player
4	Hungary	Szabina Tápai	30 January 1986 (age 40)	Central Back
5	Hungary	Andrea Lőw	20 December 1979 (age 46)	Left Winger
6	Russia	Elena Kordyuk	24 February 1977 (age 49)	Right Back
7	Hungary	Virág Vaszari	22 March 1986 (age 40)	Left Winger
8	Serbia	Boglarka Vamos	2 September 1981 (age 45)	Left Back
9	Azerbaijan	Viktoriya Ulyanich	29 August 1980 (age 46)	Left Back
10	Hungary	Fanni Kenyeres	1 October 1978 (age 48)	Left Winger
11	Hungary	Valéria Szabó	2 March 1983 (age 43)	Line Player
12	Hungary	Tímea Sugár	21 October 1977 (age 49)	Goalkeeper
13	Hungary	Barbara Brecska	17 June 1984 (age 42)	Right Back
14	Hungary	Beáta Siti	23 September 1973 (age 53)	Central Back
15	Hungary	Edina Őri	8 November 1984 (age 41)	Left Back
18	Serbia	Andrea Sterbik	21 May 1984 (age 42)	Right Winger
24	Hungary	Csilla Fekete	12 February 1980 (age 46)	Goalkeeper
25	Hungary	Beatrix Balogh	12 December 1974 (age 51)	Right Winger

2002–2003 Team
Shirt No	Nationality	Player	Birth Date	Position
1	Hungary	Andrea Farkas	1 September 1969 (age 57)	Goalkeeper
2	Hungary	Tímea Kovács	6 May 1972 (age 54)	Left Back
3	Hungary	Mária Tóth	2 January 1982 (age 44)	Left Back
4	Hungary	Szabina Tápai	30 January 1986 (age 40)	Central Back
5	Hungary	Andrea Lőw	20 December 1979 (age 46)	Left Winger
6	Romania	Christina Gisca	19 December 1978 (age 47)	Right Winger
7	Hungary	Helga Németh	7 August 1973 (age 53)	Right Back
8	Hungary	Szilvia Szőke	11 May 1979 (age 47)	Central Back
9	Hungary	Anasztázia Virincsik	28 March 1970 (age 56)	Central Back
10	Hungary	Fanni Kenyeres	1 October 1978 (age 48)	Left Winger
11	Hungary	Anita Kulcsár	2 October 1976 (age 50)	Line Player
12	Hungary	Csilla Fekete	12 February 1980 (age 46)	Goalkeeper
13	Hungary	Mónika Grezner	12 February 1982 (age 44)	Right Winger
14	Hungary	Beáta Siti	23 September 1973 (age 53)	Central Back
15	Hungary	Edina Őri	8 November 1984 (age 41)	Left Back
16	Hungary	Katalin Szórádi	19 March 1984 (age 42)	Line Player
18	Serbia	Andrea Sterbik	21 May 1984 (age 42)	Right Winger
21	Hungary	Rita Deli	21 August 1972 (age 54)	Left Back

== Honours ==
=== Domestic competitions ===
Magyar Kupa (National Cup of Hungary)

- Finalist (1): 2005–06

=== European competitions ===
- EHF Cup
  - Winners: 2005
  - Semifinalists: 2002, 2014

== Recent seasons ==
As of 23 August 2020

- Seasons in Nemzeti Bajnokság I: 28
- Seasons in Nemzeti Bajnokság I/B: 16
- Seasons in Nemzeti Bajnokság II: 3

Season	Division	Pos.	Magyar kupa
1993–94	NB I	15th	
1994–95	NB I	14th	
1995–96	NB I	10th	
1996–97	NB I	9th	
1997–98	NB I	8th	
1998–99	NB I	5th	
1999-00	NB I	5th	
2000–01	NB I	4th	
2001–02	NB I	4th	
2002–03	NB I	4th	

Season	Division	Pos.	Magyar kupa
2003–04	NB I	5th	
2004–05	NB I	4th	
2005–06	NB I	5th	Finalist
2006–07	NB I	4th	
2007–08	NB I	4th	
2008–09	NB I	5th	
2009–10	NB I	8th	
2010–11	NB I	5th	Third place
2011–12	NB I	6th	Round 3
2012–13	NB I	5th	Quarter-finals

Season	Division	Pos.	Magyar kupa
2013–14	NB I	5th	Quarter-finals
2014–15	NB I	6th	Round 4
2015–16	NB I	6th	Fourth place
2016–17	NB I	6th	Round 4
2017–18	NB I	8th	Round 4
2018–19	NB I	7th	Round 4
2019–20	NB I	Cancelled	Round 4
2020–21	NB I		

=== In European competition ===
Alba Fehérvár score listed first. As of 21 November 2020.

- Participations in EHF European League (EHF Cup): 12x
- Participations in Challenge Cup (City Cup): 1x
- Participations in Cup Winners' Cup: 2x

Season	Competition	Round	Club	Home	Away	Aggregate
1999–00	City Cup	Round of 32	(Portugal) Club Sports da Madeira	41–17	26–15	67–32
1999–00	City Cup	Round of 16	(Denmark) Randers	23–20	19–28	42–48
2000–01	EHF Cup	Second round	(Federal Republic of Yugoslavia) Radnički Beograd	26–20	24–28	50–48
2000–01	EHF Cup	Third round	(Denmark) Skovbakken	27–17	23–28	50–45
2000–01	EHF Cup	Fourth round	(Slovakia) Slovan Duslo Šaľa	27–27	23–31	50–58
2001–02	EHF Cup	Second round	(Cyprus) Anorthosis Famagusta	42–14	39–18	81–32
2001–02	EHF Cup	Third round	(Denmark) Ikast	29–26	20–43	49–69
2002–03	EHF Cup	Third round	(Austria) Wiener Neustadt	25–20	27–28	52–48
2002–03	EHF Cup	Fourth round	(Romania) Rapid București	29–25	27–31	56–55
2002–03	EHF Cup	Quarter-finals	(France) Dijon	34–24	25–27	59–51
2002–03	EHF Cup	Semi-finals	(Hungary) Dunaújváros	23–22	28–33	51–55
2003–04	EHF Cup	Second round	(Austria) Wiener Neustadt	31–26	22–28	53–54
2004–05	EHF Cup; Winner	Second round	(Romania) Cetate Deva	36–24	27–30	63–54
2004–05	EHF Cup; Winner	Third round	(Germany) Frankfurt	27–23	25–26	52–49
2004–05	EHF Cup; Winner	Round of 16	(Norway) Byåsen	25–22	27–28	52–50
2004–05	EHF Cup; Winner	Quarter-finals	(Denmark) Horsens	32–26	29–32	61–58
2004–05	EHF Cup; Winner	Semi-finals	(Hungary) Ferencváros	30–31	31–29	61–60
2004–05	EHF Cup; Winner	Finals	(Hungary) Győr	28–19	21–27	49–46
2005–06	EHF Cup	Third round	(Austria) Atzgersdorf	37–15	33–19	70–34
2005–06	EHF Cup	Round of 16	(Serbia and Montenegro) Radnički Beograd	36–19	31–21	67–40
2005–06	EHF Cup	Quarter-finals	(Croatia) Podravka Koprivnica	26–28	24–26	50–54
2006–07	Cup Winners' Cup	Second round	(Iceland) Haukar Hafnarfjörður	22–22	31–26	53–48
2006–07	Cup Winners' Cup	Third round	(Romania) Râmnicu Vâlcea	25–25	23–40	48–65
2007–08	EHF Cup	Second round	(Belgium) Fémina Visé	37–17	28–21	65–38
2007–08	EHF Cup	Third round	(Denmark) Aalborg	30–26	26–28	56–54
2007–08	EHF Cup	Round of 16	(Spain) Itxako Navarra	26–26	21–27	47–53
2008–09	EHF Cup	Second round	(Belarus) HPC Arkatron	37–19	35–15	72–34
2008–09	EHF Cup	Third round	(Greece) Ormi Patras	33–28	27–27	60–55
2008–09	EHF Cup	Round of 16	(Romania) Braşov	33–33	27–36	60–69
2009–10	EHF Cup	Second round	(Turkey) İzmir	29–26	25–22	54–48
2009–10	EHF Cup	Third round	(Poland) Lublin	27–24	20–28	47–52
2011–12	Cup Winners' Cup	Second round	(Iceland) Fram Reykjavik	29–26	31–22	60–48
2011–12	Cup Winners' Cup	Third round	(Turkey) Üsküdar Bld. SK	35–23	27–31	62–54
2011–12	Cup Winners' Cup	Round of 16	(Serbia) Zaječar	24–20	17–24	41–44
2013–14	EHF Cup	Third round	(Iceland) Fram Reykjavik	36–22	20–34	70–42
2013–14	EHF Cup	Round of 16	(Hungary) Vác	22–19	24–25	46–44
2013–14	EHF Cup	Quarter-finals	(Romania) Cluj-Napoca	24–21	28–21	52–42
2013–14	EHF Cup	Semi-finals	(Denmark) Team Esbjerg	26–27	25–24	51–51 (a)
2016–17	EHF Cup	First qualifying round	(Poland) Vistal Gdynia	28–17	27–17	55–34
2016–17	EHF Cup	Second qualifying round	(Romania) HCM Roman	28–24	27–25	55–49
2016–17	EHF Cup	Third qualifying round	(Slovakia) IUVENTA Michalovce	27–19	28–23	55–42
2016–17	EHF Cup	Group stage (Group B)	(Germany) Leipzig	29–27	34–21	3rd
2016–17	EHF Cup	Group stage (Group B)	(Russia) Kuban Krasnodar	24–31	26–31	3rd
2016–17	EHF Cup	Group stage (Group B)	(France) Brest Bretagne	25–25	21–21	3rd
2020–21	EHF European League					
2020–21	EHF European League	Qual. Round 2	(Switzerland) LC Brühl	(wo)		
2020–21	EHF European League	Qual. Round 3	(Norway) Storhamar HE	(wo)		

== Notable players ==
Goalkeepers

- (Hungary) Éva Kiss
- (Hungary) Orsolya Herr
- (Hungary) Melinda Pastrovics
- (Hungary) Melinda Szikora
- (Hungary) Tímea Sugár
- (Hungary) Csilla Fekete
- (Hungary) Andrea Farkas
- (Hungary) Olga Hoffmann
- (Hungary) Viktória Petróczi
- (Hungary) Orsolya Kurucz
- (Hungary) Annamária Vas
- (Hungary) Piroska Bartek
- (Romania) Ildiko Barbu
- (Romania) Anca Grosu
- (Romania) Iuliana Cioculeasa
- (Serbia) Slađana Đeric
- (Serbia) Natasa Savko
- (Montenegro) Sonja Barjaktarovic
- (France) Armelle Attingré
- (Croatia) Tea Pijević
- (Russia) Elena Kalashnikova
- (Brazil) Flavia Gabina Lima

Right wings

- (Hungary) Beatrix Balogh
- (Hungary) Viktória Csáki
- (Hungary) Fruzsina Dávid-Azari
- (Hungary) Zsuzsanna Lovász
- (Hungary) Ágnes Turtóczky
- (Hungary) Andrea Nagy
- (Hungary) Erika Lázár
- (Hungary) (Serbia) Andrea Sterbik
- (Romania) Nicoleta Alexandrescu
- (Brazil) Alexandra do Nascimento
- (Brazil) Adriana do Nascimento Lima
- (France) Sabrine Zazai
- (Croatia) Ana Nikšić
- (Croatia) Bruna Zrnić

Right backs

- (Hungary) Anita Herr
- (Hungary) Helga Németh
- (Hungary) Mária Jeddi
- (Serbia) Natasa Krivokapic
- (Serbia) Jelena Živković-Lavko
- (Serbia) Ninoslava Popov
- (Romania) Georgeta Năniţă
- (Russia) Elena Kordyuk
- (North Macedonia) Elena Gjeorgjievska
- (Poland) Małgorzata Trawczyńska
- (Ukraine) (Turkey) Olha Vashchuk

Line players

- (Hungary) Anita Kulcsár
- (Hungary) Szabina Mayer
- (Hungary) Valéria Szabó
- (Hungary) Katalin Tóth
- (Hungary) Zsanett Borbély
- (Hungary) Éva Agárdi
- (Hungary) Bernadett Horváth
- (Hungary) Gyöngyi Kulcsár
- (Russia) Yana Zhilinskayte
- (Lithuania) Sonata Vijunaite
- (Czech Republic) Petra Valová
- (Brazil) Daniela Piedade
- (Montenegro) Bobana Klikovac
- (Serbia) Monica Nikolic
- (Serbia) Verica Nikolic
- (Ukraine) Svetlana Moskovaya

Central backs

- (Hungary) Beáta Siti
- (Hungary) Eszter Siti
- (Hungary) Tamara Tilinger
- (Hungary) Szabina Tápai
- (Hungary) Anasztázia Virincsik
- (Hungary) Olívia Kamper
- (Hungary) Judit Csenki
- (Hungary) Edina Őri
- (Croatia) Slavica Schuster
- (Japan) Mayuko Ishitate
- (Japan) Mana Ohyama
- (Spain) Nuria Benzal
- (Ukraine) (Azerbaijan) Viktoriya Ulyanich

Left backs

- (Hungary) Rita Deli
- (Hungary) Auguszta Mátyás
- (Hungary) Borbála Tóth Harsányi
- (Hungary) Hortenzia Szrnka
- (Hungary) Krisztina Triscsuk
- (Hungary) Mária Tóth
- (Hungary) Margit Pádár
- (Hungary) Míra Emberovics
- (Hungary) Melinda Gabnai
- (Hungary) Tímea Kovács
- (Hungary) Anita Oblisz
- (Brazil) Ana Amorim
- (Russia) Olga Gorshenina
- (Serbia) Biljana Filipović-Bandelier
- (Serbia) Sanja Bogosavljevic
- (Serbia) Boglárka Vámos
- (Serbia) Katarina Stošić
- (Lithuania) Laima Bernatavičiūtė
- (Montenegro) Sandra Nikčević
- (France) Claudine Mendy
- (Croatia) Ana Maruscec
- (Croatia) Dora Lackovic
- (North Macedonia) Marija Shteriova
- (Slovakia) Jitka Kissová

Left wings

- (Hungary) Melinda Vincze
- (Hungary) Virág Vaszari
- (Hungary) Anita Kazai
- (Hungary) Fanni Kenyeres
- (Hungary) Andrea Lőw
- (Hungary) Zsuzsanna Vincze
- (Hungary) Gabriella Takács
- (Hungary) Andrea Gaál
- (Japan) Yuki Tanabe
- (Montenegro) Milica Andjušić

== Coaches ==
- (Hungary) Zsolt Barabás (1992–1993)
- (Hungary) József Zupkó (1993–1994)
- (Hungary) Tibor Babiczky (1994)
- (Hungary) Ervin Horváth (1995–1996)
- (Hungary) Mária Berzsenyi (1996–1999)
- (Hungary) Vilmos Köstner (1999–2001)
- (Hungary) Gyula Zsiga (2001–2002)
- (Hungary) Barabás Pánczél (2002)
- (Hungary) József Farkas (2003)
- (Hungary) Edina Szabó (2003–2006)
- (Hungary) József Vura (2006–2008)
- (Hungary) László Sótonyi (2008–2010)
- (Hungary) Attila Mihály (2010–2012)
- (Hungary) Csaba Konkoly (2012)
- (Norway) Pal Oldrup Jensen (2012–2014)
- (Hungary) Botond Bakó (2014–2016)
- (Hungary) Rita Deli (2016–2020)
- (Hungary) Krisztián Józsa (2020–2021; 2022–2023)
- (Croatia) Boris Dvoršek (2021–2022)
- (Hungary) Roland Horváth (2023–2024)
- (Montenegro) Suzana Lazović (2024–)
