= 2014–15 Nemzeti Bajnokság I (women's handball) =

NB I
- Season: 2014–15
- Champions: Ferencváros (12th title)
- Champions League: Ferencváros; Győr
- EHF Cup: Érd; Dunaújváros
- Cup Winners' Cup: Siófok
- Top goalscorer: Nerea Pena (163 goals)

The 2014–15 Nemzeti Bajnokság I is the 64th season of the Nemzeti Bajnokság I, Hungary's premier Handball league.

== Team information ==
Location of teams in 2014-15 Nemzeti Bajnokság I

The following 12 clubs compete in the NB I during the 2014–15 season:

Team	Location	Arena	Capacity
Békéscsabai ENKSE	Békéscsaba	Városi Sportcsarnok	2,300
Debreceni VSC	Debrecen	Hódos Imre Sportcsarnok	1,800
Dunaújvárosi KKA	Dunaújváros	Dunaferr Sportcsarnok	1,200
Érd NK	Érd	Érd Aréna	2,200
Alba Fehérvár KC	Székesfehérvár	KÖFÉM Sportcsarnok	1,200
Ferencvárosi TC	Budapest	Elek Gyula Aréna	1,300
Győri ETO KC	Győr	Egyetemi Csarnok; Audi Aréna	3,036; 5,554
Mosonmagyaróvári KC SE	Mosonmagyaróvár	Mosonszolnok Sportcsarnok	500
MTK Budapest	Budapest	Elektromos csarnok	600
Siófok KC	Siófok	Beszédes József Sportcsarnok	550
Szeged KKSE	Szeged	Újszegedi Sportcsarnok	3,200
Váci NKSE	Vác	Városi Sportcsarnok	800

=== Personnel and kits ===
Following is the list of clubs competing in 2014–15 Nemzeti Bajnokság I, with their president, head coach, kit manufacturer and shirt sponsor.

Team	President	Head coach	Kit manufacturer	Shirt sponsor(s)
Békéscsaba	Károly Szabó	(Hungary) György Avar	Erreà	EUbility Group Kft., Budapest Bank
Debrecen	Vilmos Köstner	(Hungary) József Varga	Erima	TvP, Aquaticum
Dunaújváros	István Szemenyei	(Hungary) Eszter Mátéfi	hummel	Vertikál Zrt.
Érd	Norbert Tekauer	(Hungary) Edina Szabó	Erima	Nagycsaládosok Országos Egyesülete
Fehérvár	Imre Balassi	(Hungary) Botond Bakó	hummel	Strabag
Ferencváros	Gábor Kubatov	(Hungary) Gábor Elek	Nike	Rail Cargo Hungaria, Aegon
Győr	Ernő Kelecsényi	(Spain) Ambros Martín	adidas	Audi, MVM
Mosonmagyaróvár	Dr. Gábor Tenk	(Hungary) Kálmán Róth	adidas	—
MTK Budapest	Tamás Deutsch	(Hungary) Attila Horváth	Nike	—
Siófok	János Fodor	(Hungary) Vladimir Golovin	hummel	proPannonia
Szeged	Dr. Zsolt Kovács	(Hungary) György Marosán	Erima	Exicom
Vác	Erika Kirsner	(Hungary) Katalin Ottó	Erima	IPress Center

== Regular season ==
=== Standings ===
	Team	Pld	W	D	L	GF	GA	Diff	Pts
1	Győr	22	21	0	1	691	448	+243	42
2	Ferencváros	22	20	1	1	735	507	+228	41
3	Dunaújváros	22	14	1	7	584	522	+62	29
4	Érd	22	13	1	8	582	518	+64	27
5	Siófok	22	12	2	8	656	588	+68	26
6	Fehérvár KC	22	12	1	9	509	518	−9	25
7	Debrecen	22	10	0	12	567	615	−48	20
8	Békéscsaba	22	8	0	14	555	662	−107	16
9	Vác	22	7	1	14	509	580	−71	15
10	Mosonmagyaróvár	22	5	2	15	538	597	−59	12
11	MTK Budapest	22	4	2	16	542	628	−86	10
12	Szeged	22	0	1	21	483	768	−285	1

Championship Playoff
5th – 8th Placement
Relegation Round

Pld - Played; W - Won; D - Drawn; L - Lost; GF - Goals for; GA - Goals against; Diff - Difference; Pts - Points.

==== Schedule and results ====
In the table below the home teams are listed on the left and the away teams along the top.

	Békéscsabai ENKSE	Debreceni VSC	Dunaújvárosi Kohász KA	Érd NK	Fehérvár KC	Ferencvárosi TC	Győri ETO KC	Mosonmagyaróvári KC SE	MTK Budapest KC	Siófok KC	Szeged KKSE	Váci NKSE
Békéscsaba		31–28	29–28	18–33	24–22	26–32	22–33	32–21	29–23	25–32	33–25	32–26
Debrecen	32–29		32–38	28–23	26–21	21–42	20–35	27–25	30–19	31–30	34–29	18–19
Dunaújváros	33–17	30–22		23–22	25–20	19–28	22–28	25–21	31–24	24–26	39–20	27–20
Érd	32–15	25–24	18–24		21–21	25–32	23–28	26–23	29–26	30–28	39–17	29–23
Fehérvár	25–20	23–20	23–19	20–25		19–30	19–27	26–24	29–25	30–26	38–25	17–13
Ferencváros	42–27	32–17	38–24	27–18	33–28		24–21	32–19	33–26	28–28	45–16	32–20
Győr	35–17	30–16	27–19	32–27	29–21	31–26		39–20	38–17	34–20	31–19	36–21
Mosonmagyaróvár	35–25	26–27	21–22	29–32	19–21	22–35	21–28		21–21	25–25	30–20	27–25
MTK Budapest	34–27	27–28	23–27	20–23	19–20	26–32	22–31	26–25		29–37	34–21	25–23
Siófok	38–26	30–28	20–21	24–23	29–20	28–38	23–29	33–26	40–24		44–21	27–23
Szeged	26–27	21–29	20–41	20–33	20–22	24–43	16–38	29–36	27–27	21–39		27–39
Vác	27–24	30–29	23–23	16–26	19–24	22–31	13–31	21–22	27–25	32–29	27–19	

== Championship playoff ==
Teams in bold won the playoff series. Numbers to the left of each team indicate the team's original playoff seeding. Numbers to the right indicate the score of each playoff game.

Semifinals
1	**Győri Audi ETO KC**	**36**	**25**
4	Érd	24	21
2	**FTC-Rail Cargo Hungária**	**42**	**33**
3	Dunaújvárosi Kohász KA	30	28

Final
1	Győri ETO KC	36	25
2	**FTC-Rail Cargo Hungária**	**37**	**27**
Third place
4	**Érd**	**26**	**27**
3	Dunaújvárosi Kohász KA	18	26

=== Semifinals ===
==== 1st leg ====
17 April; 18:00 (UTC+2)	**FTC-Rail Cargo Hungária**	**42 – 30**	**Dunaújvárosi Kohász KA**	Elek Gyula Aréna, Budapest; Attendance: 600; Referees: B.Pech, Vágvölgyi
17 April; 18:00 (UTC+2)	Pena 9	(16–14)	Bulath 12	Elek Gyula Aréna, Budapest; Attendance: 600; Referees: B.Pech, Vágvölgyi
17 April; 18:00 (UTC+2)	3× (yellow card) 5× (suspension)	Report	3× (yellow card) 2× (suspension)	Elek Gyula Aréna, Budapest; Attendance: 600; Referees: B.Pech, Vágvölgyi

23 April; 18:00 (UTC+2)	**Győri Audi ETO KC**	**36 – 24**	**Érd**	Audi Aréna, Győr; Attendance: 2,300; Referees: Andorka, Hucker
23 April; 18:00 (UTC+2)	Korsós 7	(20–12)	Krpež 7	Audi Aréna, Győr; Attendance: 2,300; Referees: Andorka, Hucker
23 April; 18:00 (UTC+2)	1× (yellow card) 3× (suspension)	Report	3× (yellow card) 4× (suspension)	Audi Aréna, Győr; Attendance: 2,300; Referees: Andorka, Hucker

==== 2nd leg ====
22 April; 18:00 (UTC+2)	**Dunaújvárosi Kohász KA**	**28 – 33**	**FTC-Rail Cargo Hungária**	Dunaferr Sportcsarnok, Dunaújváros; Attendance: 900; Referees: Heim, Kiss
22 April; 18:00 (UTC+2)	Vincze 8	(15–20)	Szamoránsky 8	Dunaferr Sportcsarnok, Dunaújváros; Attendance: 900; Referees: Heim, Kiss
22 April; 18:00 (UTC+2)	2× (yellow card) 2× (suspension)	Report	3× (yellow card) 4× (suspension)	Dunaferr Sportcsarnok, Dunaújváros; Attendance: 900; Referees: Heim, Kiss

FTC-Rail Cargo Hungária won series 2–0 and advanced to the final.

28 April; 18:00 (UTC+2)	**Érd**	**21 – 25**	**Győri Audi ETO KC**	Érd Aréna, Érd; Attendance: 1,400; Referees: Janáky, Temesi
28 April; 18:00 (UTC+2)	four players 4	(9–15)	Kovacsics 8	Érd Aréna, Érd; Attendance: 1,400; Referees: Janáky, Temesi
28 April; 18:00 (UTC+2)	2× (yellow card) 4× (suspension)	Report	3× (yellow card) 3× (suspension)	Érd Aréna, Érd; Attendance: 1,400; Referees: Janáky, Temesi

Győri Audi ETO KC won series 2–0 and advanced to the final.

=== Final ===
- **1st leg**

7 May; 18:00 (UTC+2)	**FTC-Rail Cargo Hungária**	**37 – 36**	**Győri Audi ETO KC**	Elek Gyula Aréna, Budapest; Attendance: 1,000; Referees: Horváth, Marton
7 May; 18:00 (UTC+2)	Szucsánszki 16	(16–12)	Sen 10	Elek Gyula Aréna, Budapest; Attendance: 1,000; Referees: Horváth, Marton
7 May; 18:00 (UTC+2)	3× (yellow card) 2× (suspension)	Report	3× (yellow card) 4× (suspension)	Elek Gyula Aréna, Budapest; Attendance: 1,000; Referees: Horváth, Marton

- **2nd leg**

14 May; 18:00 (UTC+2)	**Győri Audi ETO KC**	**25 – 27**	**FTC-Rail Cargo Hungária**	Audi Aréna, Győr; Attendance: 4,800; Referees: Andorka, Hucker
14 May; 18:00 (UTC+2)	Løke 5	(11–15)	Pena 11	Audi Aréna, Győr; Attendance: 4,800; Referees: Andorka, Hucker
14 May; 18:00 (UTC+2)	2× (yellow card) 3× (suspension)	Report	3× (yellow card) 7× (suspension)	Audi Aréna, Győr; Attendance: 4,800; Referees: Andorka, Hucker

FTC-Rail Cargo Hungária won Championship final series 2–0.

NB I 2014–15
Champions
**Ferencváros**
**12**th Title

Team roster

- 3 Anita Cifra (P)
- 4 Adrienn Szarka (LW)
- 6 Orsolya Vérten (LW)
- 7 Melinda Tóth (LW)
- 8 Zita Szucsánszki (CB)
- 12 Melinda Szikora (GK)
- 14 Rea Mészáros (P)
- 19 Mónika Kovacsicz (RW)
- 22 Viktória Lukács (RW)
- 23 Zsuzsanna Tomori (RB)
- 25 (Spain) Nerea Pena (LB)
- 27 (Serbia) Katarina Tomašević (GK)
- 32 Ágnes Kocsis (CB)
- 45 Noémi Háfra (CB)
- 48 Dorottya Faluvégi (RW)
- 98 Piroska Szamoránsky (P)

Head coach: Gábor Elek

== 5th – 8th placement ==
=== Standings ===
	Team	Pld	W	D	L	GF	GA	Diff	Pts
5	Siófoki KC-Galerius Fürdő	6	6	0	0	165	149	+16	16
6	Fehérvár KC	6	3	0	3	140	147	−7	9
7	DVSC-TvP-Aquaticum	6	3	0	3	166	157	+9	8
8	EUbility Group-Békéscsabai ENKSE	6	0	0	6	154	172	−18	1

Pld - Played; W - Won; D - Drawn; L - Lost; GF - Goals for; GA - Goals against; Diff - Difference; Pts - Points.

==== Schedule and results ====
In the table below the home teams are listed on the left and the away teams along the top.

	Békéscsabai ENKSE	Debreceni VSC	Fehérvár KC	Siófok KC
Békéscsaba		29–36	22–23	27–29
Debreceni VSC	31–27		22–17	25–26
Fehérvár KC	28–27	27–22		23–30
Siófok	25–22	31–30	24–22	

== Relegation round ==
=== Standings ===
	Team	Pld	W	D	L	GF	GA	Diff	Pts	Qualification or relegation
9	IPress Center-Vác	6	5	0	1	179	140	+39	14	
10	Mosonmagyaróvári KC SE	6	4	0	2	160	137	+23	11	
11	MTK Budapest	6	3	0	3	159	158	+1	8	Relegation to 2015–16 Nemzeti Bajnokság I/B
12	Szeged KKSE	6	0	0	6	131	194	−63	1	Relegation to 2015–16 Nemzeti Bajnokság I/B

Pld - Played; W - Won; D - Drawn; L - Lost; GF - Goals for; GA - Goals against; Diff - Difference; Pts - Points.

==== Schedule and results ====
In the table below the home teams are listed on the left and the away teams along the top.

	Mosonmagyaróvári KC SE	MTK Budapest KC	Szeged KKSE	Váci NKSE
Mosonmagyaróvár		27–24	22–15	20–26
MTK Budapest	21–28		43–28	23–22
Szeged KKSE	19–33	23–27		23–35
Vác	32–30	30–21	34–23	

== Season statistics ==
=== Top goalscorers ===
Updated to games played on 24 May 2015.

Rank	Player	Team	Goals
1	(Spain) Nerea Pena	FTC-Rail Cargo Hungária	163
2	(Hungary) Gabriella Tóth	Mosonmagyaróvári KC SE	161
3	(Hungary) Anita Bulath	Dunaújvárosi Kohász KA	154
4	(Hungary) Annamária Orbán	Siófoki KC-Galerius Fürdő	152
5	(Hungary) Tamara Tilinger	Fehérvár KC	147
6	(Hungary) Zita Szucsánszki	FTC-Rail Cargo Hungária	146
6	(Hungary) Zsuzsanna Tomori	FTC-Rail Cargo Hungária	146
8	(Hungary) Dóra Hornyák	IPress Center-Vác	144
9	(Hungary) Ildikó Erdősi	Siófoki KC-Galerius Fürdő	140
10	(Hungary) Krisztina Triscsuk	Dunaújvárosi Kohász KA	137

=== Number of teams by counties ===
	County (megye)	No. teams	Teams
1	Budapest	2	Ferencváros and MTK
1	Fejér	2	Dunaújváros and Fehérvár KC
1	Győr-Moson-Sopron	2	Győri ETO and Mosonmagyaróvár
1	Pest	2	Érd and Vác
5	Békés	1	Békéscsaba
5	Csongrád	1	Szeged KKSE
5	Hajdú-Bihar	1	Debreceni VSC
5	Somogy	1	Siófok

=== NB I clubs in 2014–15 European competitions ===
- Győri Audi ETO KC

Competition	Round	Club	Home	Away	Aggregate
EHF Champions League	Group C	(Croatia) Lokomotiva	32–23	26–15	1st
EHF Champions League	Group C	(Sweden) IK Sävehof	35–23	38–21	1st
EHF Champions League	Group C	(Denmark) Viborg HK	22–20	30–25	1st
EHF Champions League	Group 2	(Romania) Baia Mare	29–23	26–18	2nd
EHF Champions League	Group 2	(Norway) Larvik HK	25–26	19–21	2nd
EHF Champions League	Group 2	(France) Metz	31–27	27–20	2nd
EHF Champions League	QF	(North Macedonia) Vardar	27–27	18–24	45–51

- FTC-Rail Cargo Hungária

Competition	Round	Club	Home	Away	Aggregate
EHF Champions League	QT-SF	(Netherlands) Dalfsen	23–23		2nd
EHF Champions League	QT-F	(Germany) HC Leipzig	38–39 (pen.)		2nd
Cup Winners' Cup	QR3	(Serbia) ŽORK Jagodina	40–23	35–21	75–44
Cup Winners' Cup	L16	(Norway) Tertnes HE	44–27	41–26	85–53
Cup Winners' Cup	QF	(Germany) Blomberg-Lippe	34–25	33–33	67–58
Cup Winners' Cup	SF	(Denmark) Midtjylland	23–30	29–31	52–61

- Érd

Competition	Round	Club	Home	Away	Aggregate
EHF Cup	QR3	(Switzerland) SPONO Nottwil	33–18	32–21	65–39
EHF Cup	L16	(Spain) Remudas	30–22	31–23	61–45
EHF Cup	QF	(Denmark) Esbjerg	28–20	29–28	57–48
EHF Cup	SF	(Russia) Rostov-Don	24–28	28–32	52–60

- Dunaújvárosi Kohász KA

Competition	Round	Club	Home	Away	Aggregate
EHF Cup	QR3	(North Macedonia) Vardar II	28–20	30–15	58–35
EHF Cup	L16	(Russia) Rostov-Don	28–29	19–28	47–57

- Siófoki KC-Galerius Fürdő

Competition	Round	Club	Home	Away	Aggregate
Cup Winners' Cup	QR3	(North Macedonia) Metalurg	36–14	26–17	62–31
Cup Winners' Cup	L16	(Austria) Hypo NÖ	25–20	22–30	47–50

== Final standing ==
Rank	Team	Qualification or relegation
1st place, gold medalist(s)	FTC-Rail Cargo Hungária	2015–16 Women's EHF Champions League group stage
2nd place, silver medalist(s)	Győri Audi ETO KC	2015–16 Women's EHF Champions League qualification stage
3rd place, bronze medalist(s)	Érd	2015–16 Women's EHF Cup round 3
4	Dunaújvárosi Kohász KA	2015–16 Women's EHF Cup round 3
5	Siófoki KC-Galerius Fürdő	2015–16 Women's EHF Cup Winners' Cup round 3 ^{1}
6	Fehérvár KC	
7	DVSC-TvP-Aquaticum	
8	EUbility Group-Békéscsabai ENKSE	
9	IPress Center-Vác	
10	Mosonmagyaróvári KC SE	
11	MTK Budapest ^{2}	
12	Szeged KKSE	Relegation to the 2015–16 Nemzeti Bajnokság I/B

^{1} Since 2014–15 Magyar Kupa both finalists Győri Audi ETO KC and FTC-Rail Cargo Hungaria qualified for the 2015–16 EHF Champions League Group Phase and Qualification Round, the EHF Cup Winners' Cup spot was passed to cup third Siófoki KC-Galerius Fürdő.

^{2} Following 2014–15 Nemzeti Bajnokság I/B Eastern Group champions Gödi SE have declined the promotion due to financial reasons, MTK Budapest maintained its top division membership.
