= Anita Kazai =

Hungarian handball player (born 1988)

Personal information
- Full name: Anita Kitti Kazai
- Nationality: Hungarian
- Born: 28 May 1988 (age 38) Szeged, Hungary
- Height: 1.78 m (5 ft 10 in)

Sport
- Sport: Handball
- Position: Left wing
- Current club: Dunaújvárosi KKA
- Number: 34

Senior clubs
- Years: Team
- 2005–2013: Debreceni VSC
- 2008–2009: → Hajdúnánás SC (loan)
- 2013–2017: Alba Fehérvár KC
- 2017–2023: Dunaújvárosi KKA
- 2023–: Szombathelyi KKA
National team
Years	Team	Apps	(Gls)
2018–	Hungary	10	(11)
- Updated on 13 December 2018

Anita Kazai (born 28 May 1988) is a Hungarian handballer for Dunaújvárosi KKA and the Hungarian national team.

== Career ==
A native of Szeged, has four siblings. When she was 16, playing with her school team on a tournament against schoolgirls of Debrecen, DVSC youth coach spotted her and immediately asked whether she would like to join the Hajdú-Bihar side.

Luckily on that match everything went well for me. Whatever I made, it was perfect. My mom have been there on the match as well, and Józsi Varga, who was the youth coach of Debrecen that time, came to us and asked whether I want to join the forces of DVSC. It was a great pleasure, that they've chosen me, I don't have to say how happy I was. It was an amazing opportunity to be part of a top level club, so of course I didn't hesitate. – Kazai remembers in an interview.

In her inaugural season by DVSC she could not break into the first team yet and played only for the second team. From the next season, as she got more matured, she had some playing minutes in the first team too, and had the chance to prove herself in the playoffs (2 matches/3 goals). The breakthrough came in 2009, and since then, despite her young age, she was an important member of the first team.

She debuted in the national team on 28 September 2018 against Montenegro at the age of 30.

== Personal ==
Because of her fragile, slender body she got the nickname Csibe (Chicken) from her first coach, Imre Bíró. Her best friend is her former room-mate Viktória Csáki.

== Achievements ==
- Nemzeti Bajnokság I:
  - Silver Medallist: 2010, 2011
- Magyar Kupa:
  - Silver Medallist: 2011
- World University Championship:
  - Winner: 2010
