= Szabina Mayer =

Hungarian handball player (born 1988)

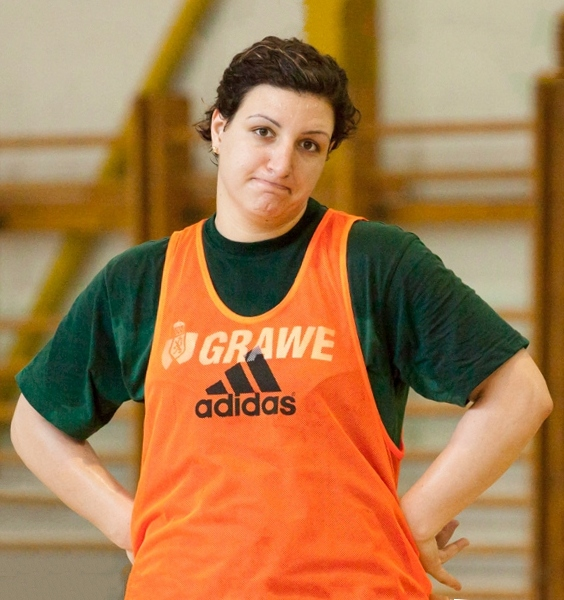
- Mayer in 2011

Personal information
- Nationality: Hungarian
- Born: 24 March 1988 (age 38) Pápa, Hungary
- Height: 1.70 m (5 ft 7 in)

Sport
- Sport: Handball
- Position: Pivot
- Current club: Békéscsabai Előre NKSE
- Number: 24

Senior clubs
- Years: Team
- 2005–2011: Győri ETO KC
- 2006–2007: → Hódmezővásárhelyi NKC (loan)
- 2007–2008: → Alba Fehérvár KC (loan)
- 2011–2012: Veszprém BKC
- 2012–2014: Váci NKSE
- 2014–2018: Alba Fehérvár KC
- 2018: Nantes Handball
- 2018–2019: SønderjyskE Håndbold
- 2019–2021: Szombathelyi KKA
- 2021–2024: Békéscsabai Előre NKSE
National team
Years	Team	Apps	(Gls)
2008–	Hungary	50	(62)

Szabina Mayer (née Reiner; born 24 March 1988) is a Hungarian handballer for Békéscsaba.

== Achievements ==
- Nemzeti Bajnokság I:
  - Winner: 2006, 2009, 2010, 2011
- Magyar Kupa:
  - Winner: 2006, 2009, 2010, 2011
- EHF Champions League:
  - Finalist: 2009
  - Semifinalist: 2010, 2011
