= Anita Herr =

Hungarian handball player (born 1987)

Personal information
- Full name: Anita Herr
- Nationality: Hungarian
- Born: 25 January 1987 (age 39) Tatabánya, Hungary
- Height: 1.77 m (5 ft 10 in)

Sport
- Sport: Handball
- Position: Right Back
- Current club: Retired

Senior clubs
- Years: Team
- 2005–2006: Győri ETO KC
- 2006–2007: Kiskunhalas NKSE
- 2007–2008: Békéscsabai ENKSE
- 2008–2009: Győri ETO KC
- 2009–2010: VfL Oldenburg
- 2010–2011: VfL Sindelfingen
- 2012: Siófok KC
- 2012–2013: Debreceni VSC
- 2013–2016: Fehérvár KC
- 2016–2018: Vasas SC
National team
Years	Team	Apps	(Gls)
2008–2011	Hungary	5	(1)
- Updated on 22 July 2018

Anita Herr (born 25 January 1987 in Tatabánya) is a former Hungarian handballer.

== Achievements ==
- Nemzeti Bajnokság I:
  - Winner: 2006, 2009
- Magyar Kupa:
  - Winner: 2006, 2009
- EHF Champions League:
  - Finalist: 2009
- EHF Cup Winners' Cup:
  - Finalist: 2006

== Personal ==
Anita's older sister, Orsolya is also a Hungarian international handballer.
