= Rita Lakatos =

Hungarian handball player (born 1999)

Personal information
- Nationality: Hungarian
- Born: 6 July 1999 (age 27) Dunajská Streda, Slovakia
- Height: 1.77 m (5 ft 10 in)

Sport
- Sport: Handball
- Position: Centre back
- Current club: Siófok KC
- Number: 20

Youth career
- Years: Team
- –2013: Győri ETO KC

Senior clubs
- Years: Team
- 2013–2021: Győri ETO KC
- 2016–2017: → Mosonmagyaróvári KC (loan)
- 2017–2018: → Váci NKSE (loan)
- 2018: → Byåsen HE (loan)
- 2018–2021: → Váci NKSE (loan)
- 2021–2023: Siófok KC
National team
Years	Team	Apps	(Gls)
2018–	Hungary	16	(18)
Medal record
Junior World Championship
Gold medal – first place	2018 Hungary
Youth European Championship
Bronze medal – third place	2015 Macedonia
- Updated on 14 October 2021

Rita Lakatos (born 6 July 1999) is a Hungarian handballer for Siófok KC, and the Hungarian national team.

She made her international debut on 1 December 2018 against Netherlands.

== Achievements ==
National team

- IHF Women's Junior World Championship:
  - Gold: 2018
- EHF Youth European Championship:
  - Bronze: 2015

Domestic competitions

- Nemzeti Bajnokság I:
  - Gold: 2016
- Magyar Kupa:
  - Gold: 2016

European competitions

- EHF Champions League:
  - Silver: 2016

Other competitions

- ISF World Schools Championship:
  - Gold: 2016
