= Kitti Becséri =

Hungarian handball player (born 1993)

Personal information
- Nationality: Hungarian
- Born: 8 January 1993 (age 33) Székesfehérvár, Hungary
- Height: 1.68 m (5 ft 6 in)

Sport
- Sport: Handball
- Position: Playmaker, Left Wing
- Current club: EURONOVEX USE
- Number: 32

Senior clubs
- Years: Team
- 2009–2015: Fehérvár KC
- 2015–2018: Vasas SC
- 2018–2019: Kispest NKK
- 2019–: EURONOVEX USE

Kitti Becséri (born 8 January 1993 in Székesfehérvár) is a Hungarian handballer who currently plays for EURONOVEX USE.

== Achievements ==
- Magyar Kupa:
  - Bronze Medallist: 2011
