= Csenge Hajduch =

Hungarian handball player (born 1990)

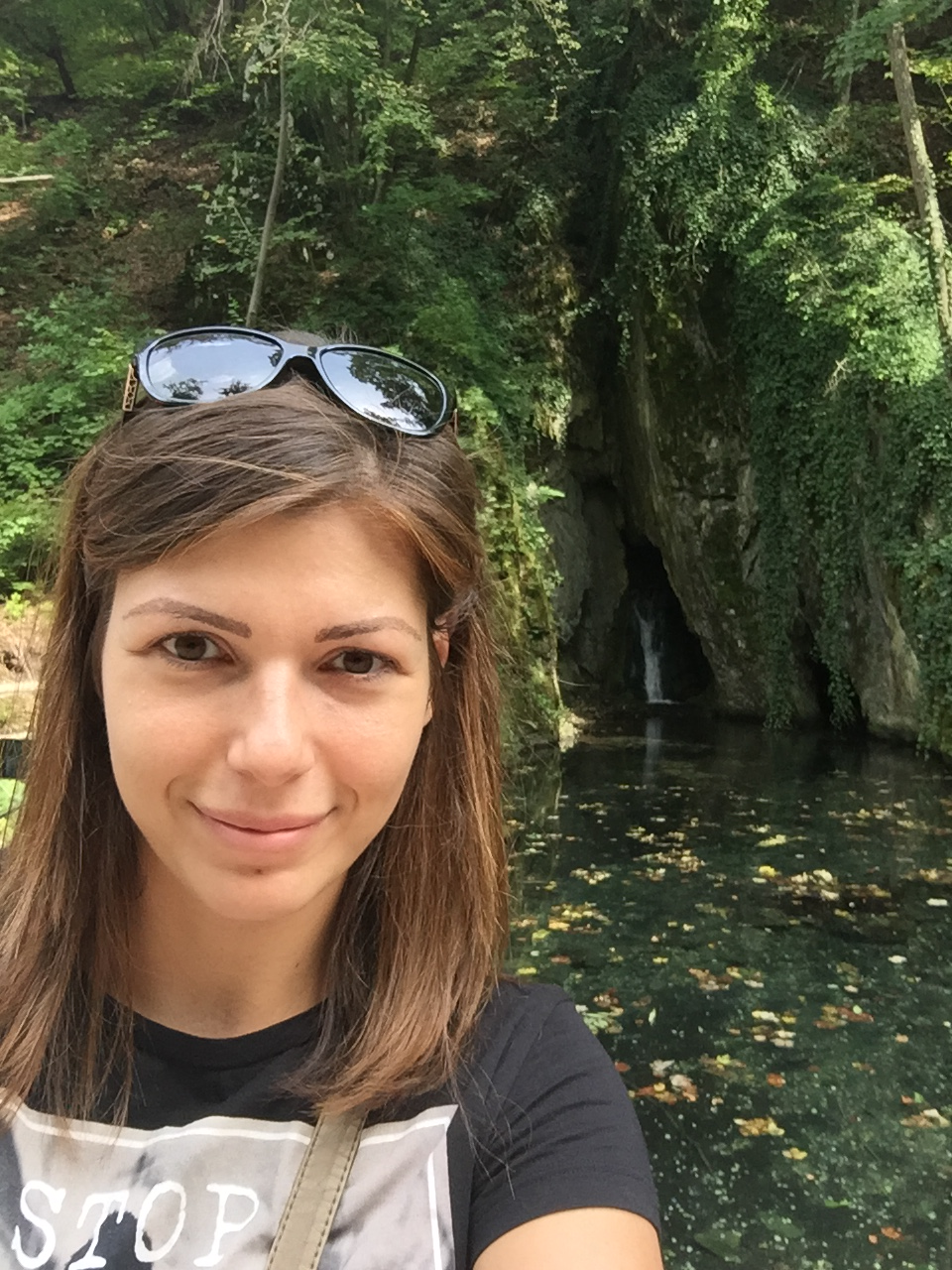
- Csenge Hajduch in 2016

Personal information
- Full name: Csenge Hajduch
- Nationality: Hungarian
- Born: 3 October 1990 (age 36) Békéscsaba, Hungary
- Height: 1.81 m (5 ft 11 in)

Sport
- Sport: Handball
- Position: Right Back
- Current club: Budaörs Handball
- Number: 19

Youth career
- Years: Team
- –2007: Békéscsabai ENKSE

Senior clubs
- Years: Team
- 2007–2013: Békéscsabai ENKSE
- 2013–2017: Alba Fehérvár KC
- 2017–2018: Debreceni VSC
- 2018–: Budaörs Handball

Csenge Hajduch (Hungarian: [ˈt͡ʃɛŋɡɛ ˈhɒjduh]; born 3 October 1990) is a Hungarian handballer who plays for Budaörs Handball in right back position. She has also been capped for the Hungarian junior national team.

== Achievements ==
- Magyar Kupa:
  - Silver Medalist: 2012
  - Bronze Medalist: 2010
