= Bobana Klikovac =

Montenegrin handball player (born 1995)

Bobana Olteanu
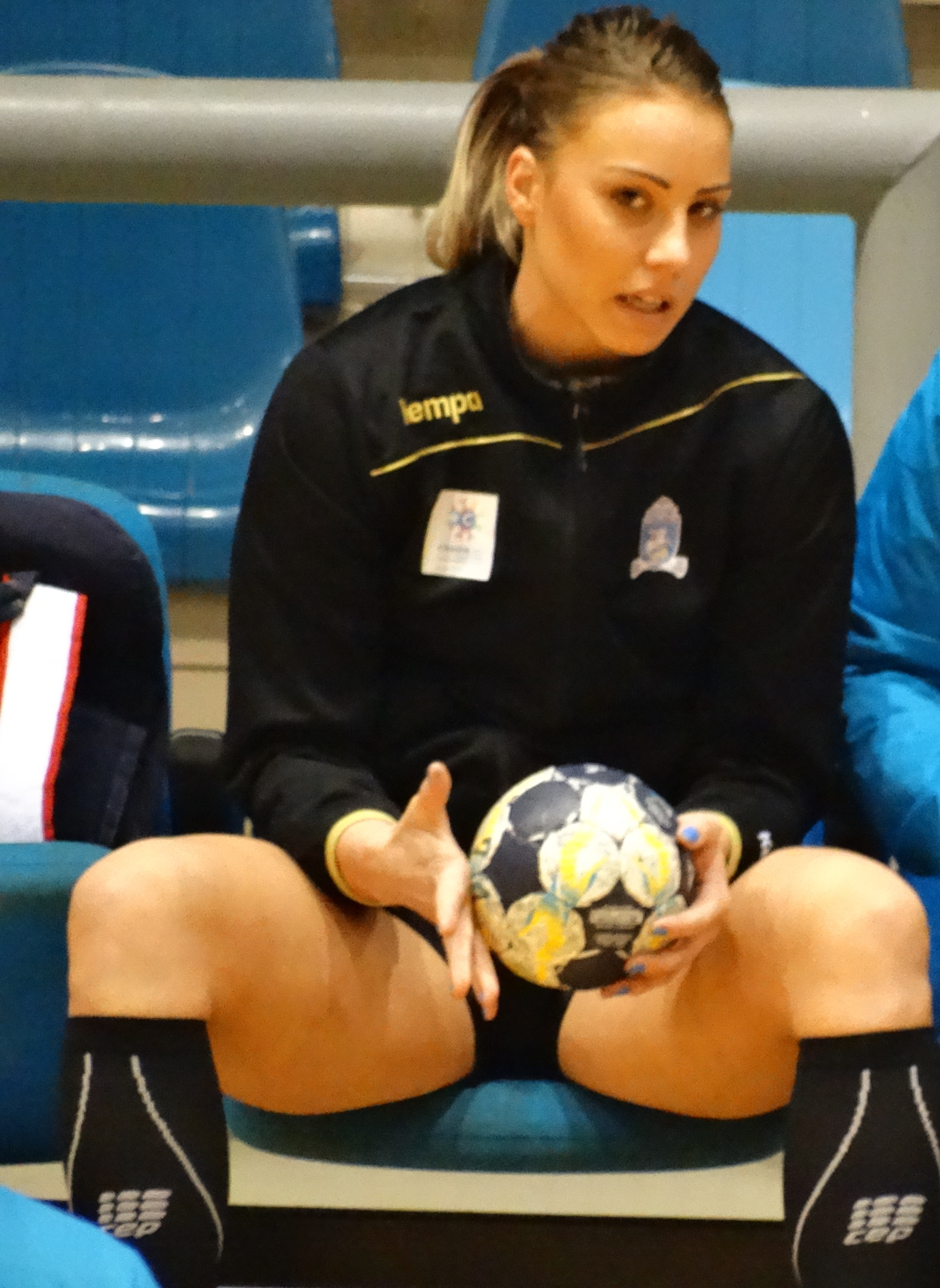

Personal information
- Nationality: Montenegrin
- Born: 19 July 1995 (age 31) Cetinje, Montenegro, FR Yugoslavia
- Height: 1.81 m (5 ft 11 in)

Sport
- Sport: Handball
- Position: Pivot
- Current club: HC Dunărea Brăila
- Number: 71

Youth career
- Years: Team
- 2011–2013: WHC Biseri

Senior clubs
- Years: Team
- 2013–2015: ŽRK Danilovgrad
- 2015–2016: Debreceni VSC
- 2016–2017: Fehérvár KC
- 2017–2018: SCM Craiova
- 2018–2019: Ferencvárosi TC
- 2019–2020: SCM Craiova
- 2020–2021: Gloria Buzău
- 2021-2023: SCM Râmnicu Vâlcea
- 2023–2025: CSM Corona Brașov
- 2025-: HC Dunărea Brăila
National team
Years	Team	Apps	(Gls)
–	Montenegro	49	(42)

Bobana Olteanu (born 19 July 1995) is a Montenegrin handball player for HC Dunărea Brăila and the Montenegrin national team.

== International honours ==
- EHF Cup:
  - Winner: 2018
