= Virág Vaszari =

Hungarian handball player (born 1986)

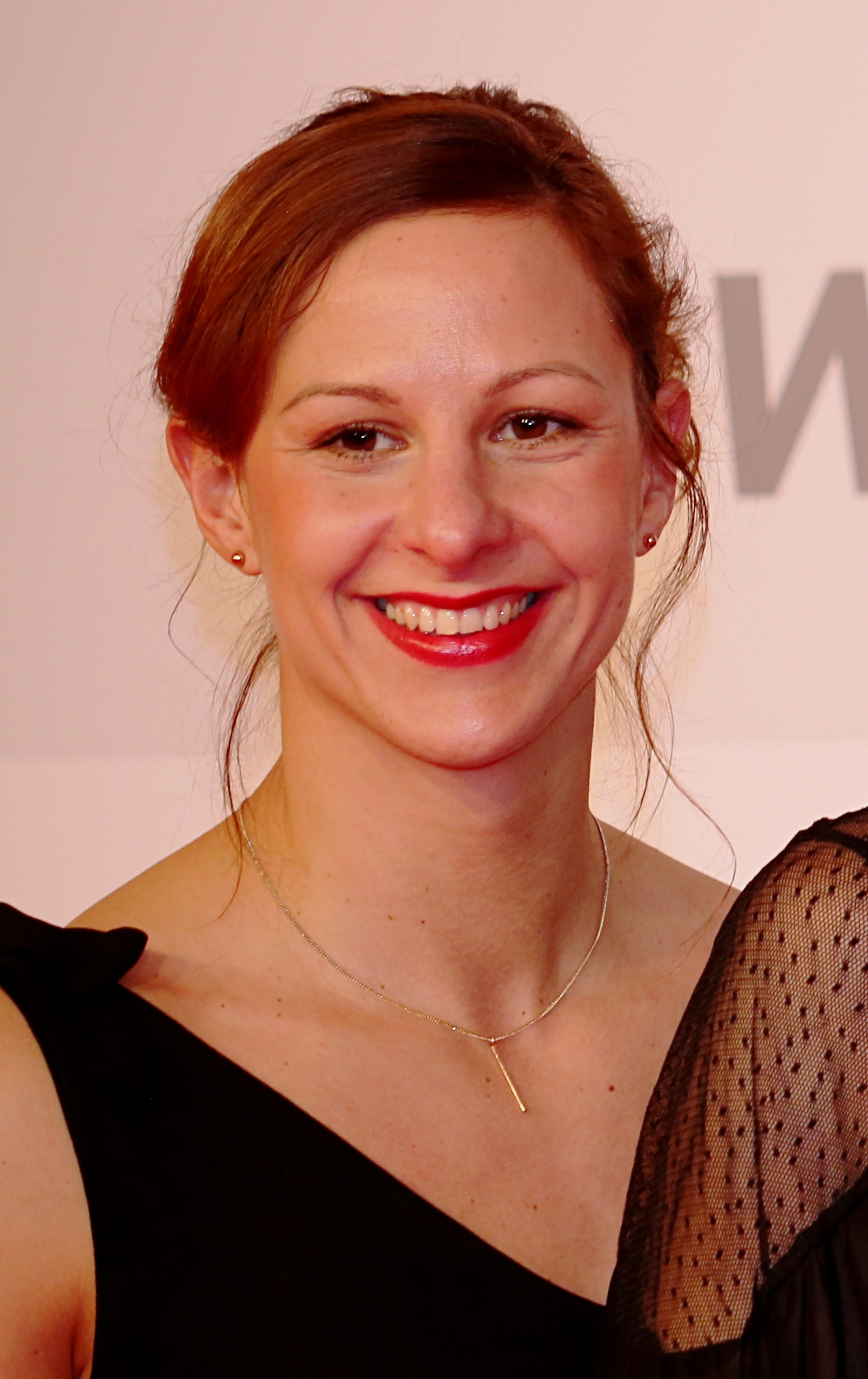

Personal information
- Full name: Virág Vaszari
- Nationality: Hungarian
- Born: 22 March 1986 (age 40) Dombóvár, Hungary
- Height: 1.76 m (5 ft 9 in)

Sport
- Sport: Handball
- Position: Left Wing

Senior clubs
- Years: Team
- 2003–2009: Fehérvár KC
- 2009–2011: Váci NKSE
- 2011–2014: Fehérvár KC
- 2014–2019: Borussia Dortmund Handball

Virág Vaszari (born 22 March 1986 in Dombóvár) is a retired Hungarian team handball player.

== Achievements ==
- Nemzeti Bajnokság I:
  - Bronze Medalist: 2010
- Magyar Kupa
  - Finalist: 2006
- EHF Cup
  - Winner: 2005
