= Aneja Beganovič =

Slovene handball player

Personal information
- Nationality: Slovenian
- Born: 9 November 1997 (age 28) Ljubljana, Slovenia
- Height: 1.73 m (5 ft 8 in)

Sport
- Sport: Handball
- Position: Pivot
- Current club: RK Podravka Koprivnica
- Number: 4

Senior clubs
- Years: Team
- –2015: DRŠ Vrhnika
- 2015–2018: RK Krim
- 2018–2020: Nantes Atlantique Handball
- 2020–2021: RK Podravka Koprivnica
- 2021–2021: Szombathelyi KKA
- 2021–: Mosonmagyaróvári KC SE
National team
| Years | Team | Apps | (Gls) |
| 2015– | Slovenia | 39 | (57) |

Aneja Beganovič (born 9 November 1997) is a Slovenian female handballer for RK Krim and the Slovenian national team.

== International honours ==
- EHF Cup Winners' Cup:
  - Semifinalist: 2016
