= Elena Livrinikj =

Macedonian handball player

Personal information
- Nationality: Macedonian
- Born: 16 November 1994 (age 31) Skopje, Macedonia
- Height: 181 cm (5 ft 11 1/2 in)

Sport
- Sport: Handball
- Position: Left back
- Current club: Gloria Buzău

Senior clubs
- Years: Team
- –2016: ŽRK Metalurg
- 2016–2019: CSU Danubius Galați
- 2019–2020: CS Rapid București
- 2020–2021: SCM Gloria Buzău
- 2021–2022: CSM Slatina
- 2022–: Szombathelyi KKA
National team
- Years: Team
- –: Macedonia

Elena Livrinikj (born 16 November 1994) is a Macedonian handball player who plays for Gloria Buzău and the Macedonian national team.
