= Fanni Kenyeres =

Hungarian handball player (born 1978)

Personal information
- Full name: Fanni Kenyeres
- Nationality: Hungarian
- Born: 1 October 1978 (age 48) Salgótarján, Hungary
- Height: 1.75 m (5 ft 9 in)

Sport
- Sport: Handball
- Position: Left Wing
- Current club: —

Senior clubs
- Years: Team
- –1998: Budapesti Spartacus SC
- 1998–2001: Vasas SC
- 2001–2007: Alcoa FKC
- 2008: CS Tomis Constanţa
- 2008–2010: Ferencvárosi TC
National team
Years	Team	Apps	(Gls)
1997–2006	Hungary	35	(68)
Medal record
World Championship
Bronze medal – third place	2005 Russia	Team

Fanni Kenyeres (born 1 October 1978 in Salgótarján) is a retired Hungarian international handball player and World Championship bronze medalist.

== Career ==
Kenyeres played for several clubs, including Budapest Spartacus SC and Vasas SC before joining Alcoa FKC, where she achieved her biggest successes on club level. In 2002, she failed with the Székesfehérvár-based team in the EHF Cup semifinals yet, but three years later they finally triumphed. In the semifinals they won an epic battle against domestic rivals Ferencvárosi TC with a one-goal aggregate difference (30–31; 29–31), to face another Hungarian team, namely Győri ETO KC in the finals. After a six-goal loss in Győr (27–21), Alcoa made desperate efforts to turn the things around in the rematch. As a result, they won the second leg by nine goals (28–19), that was more than enough to win the cup, first time in the club's history. In 2006 Kenyeres also added a Hungarian cup silver to her medal collection.

On 12 October 2007 she agreed a mutual termination over her contract and stayed away from handball for the rest of the season to concentrate fully on her college studies. She returned into action in the next summer, when, in July 2008 she accepted an offer from CS Tomis Constanţa. However, this spell was cut short, as Kenyeres had many problems in the port city and eventually decided to terminate her contract with immediate effect. She left the club just after two months without playing a single competitive match. Not much later, on 26 August 2008 she signed to Ferencváros. She spent two seasons with Fradi, during which time she has obtained a league and a cup silver. She retired from professional handball in 2010. Prior to her last match, played on 15 May 2010, she was awarded the Zöld Sas Trophy, a prize given by the supporters for the one who contributed the most to the club's success in that year.

Kenyeres was capped 35 times for Hungary, in which she scored 68 goals. She played on two World Championships in 1997 and in 2005, winning a bronze medal in the latter one.

== Achievements ==
- Nemzeti Bajnokság I:
  - Silver Medalist: 2009
- Magyar Kupa:
  - Silver Medalist: 2006, 2010
- EHF Cup:
  - Winner: 2005
- World Championship:
  - Bronze Medalist: 2005
