= Ana Turk =

Croatian handball player (born 1989)

Personal information
- Nationality: Croatian
- Born: 29 June 1989 (age 37) Jakarta, Indonesia
- Height: 1.69 m (5 ft 7 in)

Sport
- Sport: Handball
- Position: Right wing
- Current club: RK Podravka Koprivnica
- Number: 3

Senior clubs
- Years: Team
- 2008–2012: RK Lokomotiva Zagreb
- 2011–2012: → Fehérvár KC (loan)
- 2012–2014: Váci NKSE
- 2014–2023: RK Podravka Koprivnica
National team
Years	Team	Apps	(Gls)
–	Croatia	23	(37)

Ana Turk (née Nikšić; born 29 June 1989) is a Croatian handball player for RK Podravka Koprivnica and the Croatian national team.

She participated at the 2018 European Women's Handball Championship.
