= Ana Maruščec =

Croatian handball player (born 1988)

Personal information
- Full name: Ana Maruščec
- Nationality: Croatian
- Born: 31 August 1988 (age 38) Zagreb, SR Croatia, SFR Yugoslavia
- Height: 1.85 m (6 ft 1 in)

Sport
- Sport: Handball
- Position: Right Back
- Current club: Alcoa FKC
- Number: 41

Senior clubs
- Years: Team
- –2010: RK Lokomotiva Zagreb
- 2010–2011: RK Zamet Rijeka
- 2011–: Alcoa FKC

Ana Maruščec (born 31 August 1988, in Zagreb) is a Croatian team handball player who plays for Alcoa FKC in right back position.

== Achievements ==
- Croatian Cup:
  - Winner: 2007
