= Katty Piejos =

French handball player (born 1981)

Personal information
- Full name: Katty Tolla Piejos
- Nationality: French
- Born: 21 August 1981 (age 45) La Trinité, Martinique, French West Indies
- Height: 1.63 m (5 ft 4 in)

Sport
- Sport: Handball
- Position: Right wing

Youth career
- Years: Team
- 1993-2001: Réveil Sportif (Gros-Morne, Martinique)

Senior clubs
- Years: Team
- 2001-2004: Havre Athletic Club Handball
- 2004-2013: Metz Handball
- 2004-2013: CJF Fleury
- 2014: Dinamo Volgograd
- 2014-2015: AS Cannes
- 2015: Toulouse FHB
National team
| Years | Team | Apps | (Gls) |
| 2006-2014 | France | 128 | (377) |
Medal record
Mediterranean Games
| Gold medal – first place | 2009 Pescara | Team |
World Championship
| Silver medal – second place | 2009 China |
- Updated on 4 December 2012

Katty Tolla Piejos (born 21 August 1981) is a French former handball player.

She participated at the 2009 World Women's Handball Championship in China, winning a silver medal with the French team.

== Teams ==
- Réveil Sportif (Gros-Morne, Martinique), 1993-2001
- Havre Athletic Club Handball, 2001-2004
- Metz Handball 2004-2013

== Results ==
- Champion of the French Championship of second division (D2F) in 2002 (Le Havre)
- Fourth of the French Championship of the first division (D1F) in 2003 (Le Havre)
- Third of the French Championship of the first division (D1F) in 2004 (Le Havre)
- Champion of the French Championship of first division (D1F) in 2005, 2006, 2007, 2008, 2009 and 2011 (Metz)
- Win the French League Cup in 2005, 2006, 2007, 2008, 2009, 2010 and 2011 (Metz)
- Win the Bronze medal Of the European's Championship in 2006, in Switzerland (French Team)
- Fifth in the World Championship in 2007, in France, with 2 matches played (French Team)
- Silver medal at the 2009 World Women's Handball Championship

== Awards ==
- Best player of the TIPIFF tournament, Paris 2006
- 3rd best right wing of the French championship (D1F) 2007-2008

== Statistics ==
- French Championship
  - 2002-2003: 27 goals, 1.3 goals per game, 0.51 of success
  - 2003-2004: 26 goals, 1.2 goals per game, 0.58 of success
  - 2004-2005: 25 goals, 1.2 goals per game, 0.50 of success
  - 2005-2006: 70 goals, 3.2 goals per game, 0.60 of success
  - 2006-2007: 77 goals, 3.5 goals per game, 0.56 of success
  - 2007-2008: 84 goals, 3.82 goals per game, 0.60 of success
  - 2008-2009: 18 goals, 3.6 goals per game, 0.61 of success
- Champions league of the EHF
  - 2004-2005: 2 games, 7 goals, 3,5 goals per game
  - 2005-2006: 4 games, 14 goals, 3,5 goals per game
  - 2006-2007: 4 games, 13 goals, 3,25 goals per game
  - 2007-2008: 20 goals, 4 goals per game
  - 2008-2009: 13 goals, 4.3 goals per game, 0.68 of success
- EHF Cup
  - 2004-2005: 6 games, 4 goals, 0,67 goals per game
  - 2005-2006: 6 games, 7 goals, 1,17 goals per game
  - 2006-2007: 4 games, 16 goals, 4 goals per game
  - 2007-2008: 2 games, 9 goals, 4.5 goals per game
- French League Cup
  - 2007-2008:3 games, 8 goals, 2.67 goals per game
- French Team
  - 20 selections: 19 goals, 0.95 goals per game
