= Katalin Tóth =

Hungarian handball player (born 1984)

Katalin Zöldi-Tóth
Personal information
- Full name: Katalin Zöldi-Tóth
- Nationality: Hungarian
- Born: 25 June 1984 (age 42) Sátoraljaújhely, Hungary
- Height: 1.74 m (5 ft 9 in)

Sport
- Sport: Handball
- Position: Line Player
- Current club: CORNER-GYULASPORT NKFT
- Number: 29

Senior clubs
- Years: Team
- 1998–2002: Vasas SC
- 2002–2005: Alcoa FKC
- 2005–2013: Békéscsabai ENKSE
- 2015–2019: Békéscsabai ENKSE
- 2019-present: CORNER-GYULASPORT NKFT
National team
Years	Team	Apps	(Gls)
2009	Hungary	19	(37)
- Updated on 22 of July 2018

Katalin Zöldi-Tóth (born 25 June 1984 in Sátoraljaújhely) is a Hungarian handballer who plays for Békéscsabai Előre NKSE and the Hungarian national team.

She made her international debut on 6 June 2009 against Slovakia.

== Achievements ==
- Magyar Kupa:
  - Silver Medalist: 2012
  - Bronze Medalist: 2010
- EHF Cup:
  - Winner: 2005
