= Claudine Mendy =

French handball player (born 1990)

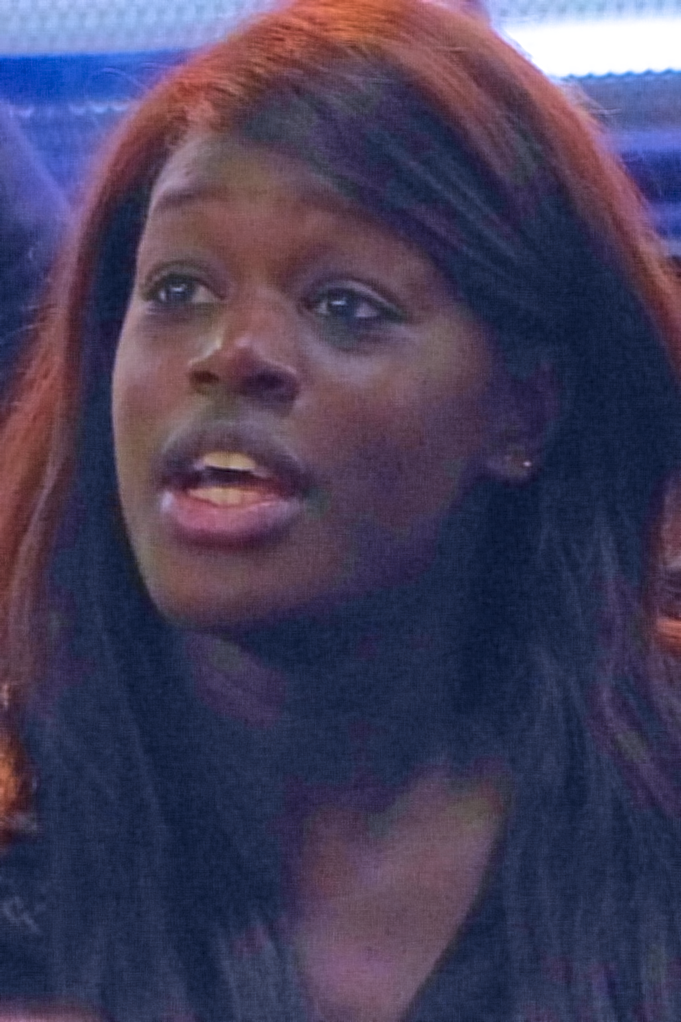
- Claudine Mendy, in 2015

Personal information
- Nationality: French
- Born: 8 January 1990 (age 36) Mantes-la-Jolie, France
- Height: 1.82 m (6 ft 0 in)

Sport
- Sport: Handball
- Position: Left back
- Current club: Bourg-de-Péage Drôme Handball
- Number: 8

Senior clubs
- Years: Team
- 2007-2010: Le Havre AC
- 2010-2012: Metz Handball
- 2012-2013: RK Budućnost Podgorica
- 2014: Issy Paris Hand
- 2014-2015: Metz Handball
- 2015-2016: HBC Nimes
- 2016-2020: Fehérvár KC
- 2020-2023: Bourg-de-Péage Drôme Handball
National team
Years	Team	Apps	(Gls)
2009-2013	France	84	(169)
Medal record
World Championship
Silver medal – second place	2009 China	Team
Silver medal – second place	2011 Brazil	Team
- Updated on 4 December 2012

Claudine Mendy (born 8 January 1990) is a French handball player. She plays for Bourg-de-Péage Drôme Handball and the French national team. In the 2015-2016 season, she would go on to play as a left back for Handball Cercle Nimes.

She participated at the 2009 World Women's Handball Championship in China, winning a silver medal with the French team. Two years later she repeated the achievement, winning another silver medal at the 2011 World Championship. She was also part of the French team at the 2012 Summer Olympics.

She is of Senegalese origin, her parents were born in the African country.
