= Fruzsina Dávid-Azari =

Hungarian handball player (born 1989)

Personal information
- Full name: Fruzsina Dávid-Azari
- Nationality: Hungarian
- Born: 29 June 1989 (age 37) Dunaújváros, Hungary
- Height: 1.74 m (5 ft 9 in)

Sport
- Sport: Handball
- Position: Right Wing
- Current club: Érd HC
- Number: 7

Senior clubs
- Years: Team
- 2007–2009: Dunaújvárosi KKA
- 2009–2011: Alba Fehérvár KC
- 2011–2012: Veszprém BKC
- 2012–2014: Alba Fehérvár KC
- 2014–2018: Dunaújvárosi KKA
- 2018–2019: Budaörs Handball
- 2019–2021: MTK Budapest
- 2022–2024: Érd HC
- 2024–: MTK Budapest
National team
Years	Team	Apps	(Gls)
2018	Hungary	1	(1)
- Updated on 29 September 2018

Fruzsina Dávid-Azari (née Azari) (born 29 June 1989) is a Hungarian handballer who plays for Érd HC in right wing position.

== Achievements ==
- EHF Cup
  - Winner: 2016
- Nemzeti Bajnokság I:
  - Bronze Medalist: 2007
- Magyar Kupa:
  - Bronze Medalist: 2011

== Personal life ==
She is married to former basketball player Kornél Dávid. She gave birth to their first son, Barnabás Dalton in July 2017. Their second son, Soma was born in 2021.
