= József Vura =

Hungarian handball player and coach (born 1955)

József Vura (born 6 February 1955 in Paks) is a former Hungarian international handball player and handball coach, who was most recently in charge by HK IUVENTA Michalovce.

During his playing career, Vura had spells by Dunaújváros, Szondi SE and Rába ETO and he also won 19 caps for the Hungarian national team. As a head coach he managed Alcoa FKC, Váci NKSE and Győri ETO KC. Vura had his most successful period by Győr, with them he finished on a podium place five times and also reached the finals of the EHF Cup two times, but he lost the decisive match-ups on both occasions.

In May 2011 Vura signed a three-year contract with Women's Handball International League club HK IUVENTA Michalovce. In January 2012, however, following the team failed to meet the expectations of the club board, HK IUVENTA canceled Vura's contract and he was replaced by Ján Packa.

== Achievements ==
- Nemzeti Bajnokság I:
  - Silver Medalist: 1998, 2000
  - Bronze Medalist: 1999, 2001, 2002
- EHF Cup:
  - Finalist: 1999, 2002
