= Biljana Filipović =

Serbian handball player (born 1986)

Biljana Filipović-Bandelier
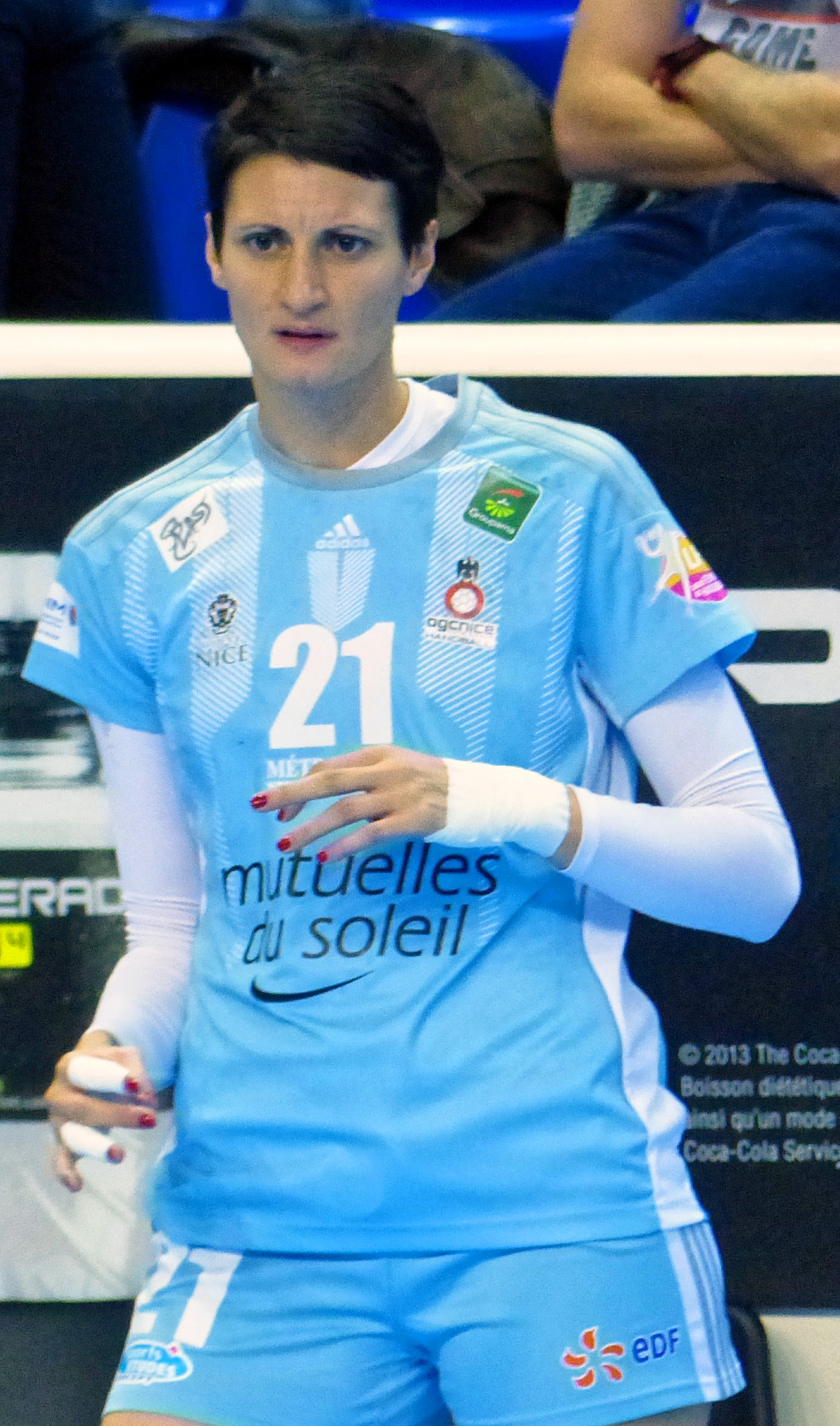
- Biljana Filipović in 2014

Personal information
- Nationality: Serbian
- Born: 12 January 1986 (age 40) Belgrade, Serbia
- Height: 1.89 m (6 ft 2 in)

Sport
- Sport: Handball
- Position: Left back

Senior clubs
- Years: Team
- -2008: RK Naisa Niš
- 2008-2010: CJF Fleury
- 2010-2012: Arvor 29
- 2012-2012: Üsküdar
- 2013-2015: OGC Nice
- 2015-2017: Fehervar KC
- 2018-2019: Toulon Saint-Cyr Var Handball
- 2019-2021: Szombathelyi KKA
National team
Years	Team	Apps	(Gls)
–	Serbia	50	(96)
Medal record
World Championship
Silver medal – second place	2013 Serbia

Biljana Filipović-Bandelier (born 12 January 1986) is a retired Serbian handball player who was a member of the Serbian national team.
