= Viktória Csáki =

Hungarian handball player (born 1986)

Personal information
- Full name: Viktória Csáki
- Nationality: Hungarian
- Born: 3 March 1986 (age 40) Tiszalök, Hungary
- Height: 1.75 m (5 ft 9 in)

Sport
- Sport: Handball
- Position: Right Wing
- Current club: Retired

Youth career
- Years: Team
- 2000–2002: Debreceni VSC

Senior clubs
- Years: Team
- 2002–2011: Debreceni VSC
- 2003–2004: → Derecske KK (loan)
- 2011–2012: Metz Handball
- 2012–2014: Békéscsabai ENKSE
- 2014–2016: Fehérvár KC
- 2016–2018: Debreceni VSC
- 2018–2019: Nyíradony VVTK
National team
Years	Team	Apps	(Gls)
2006–2007	Hungary	12	(17)
- Updated on January 2019

Viktória Csáki (Hungarian: [ˈviktoːriɒ ˈt͡ʃaːki]; born 3 March 1986) is a retired Hungarian handballer.

She got acquainted with handball in the school at the age of ten, and two years later she was already playing for local club TVSE. She was signed by Debreceni VSC at the age of fourteen and made her senior debut in the 2002–2003 season. However, she was yet unable to break into the first team and has been sent to Tajtavill-Derecske to gain more playing minutes and experience. After her comeback she rose through the ranks quickly, and from 2006 until her leave in 2011 she was considered a regular first team player. In December 2011 Csáki switched to French top club Metz Handball.

Csáki made her international debut on 4 April 2006 against Norway. She participated at the 2010 European Championship, where Hungary finished tenth.

== Achievements ==
- Nemzeti Bajnokság I:
  - Silver Medallist: 2010, 2011
  - Bronze Medallsit: 2009
- Magyar Kupa:
  - Silver Medallist: 2009, 2011
  - Bronze Medallist: 2008
- World University Championship:
  - Winner: 2010
