= Szabina Tápai =

Hungarian handball player (born 1986)

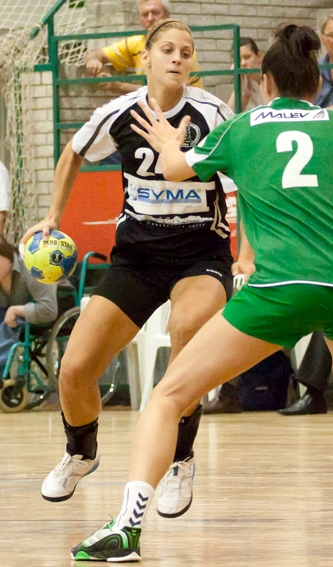
- Tápai in 2011

Personal information
- Full name: Szabina Tápai
- Nationality: Hungarian
- Born: 30 January 1986 (age 40) Kiskunhalas, Hungary
- Height: 1.74 m (5 ft 9 in)

Sport
- Sport: Handball
- Position: Middle Back
- Current club: Retired

Senior clubs
- Years: Team
- –2002: Kiskunhalas NKSE
- 2002–2008: Fehérvár KC
- 2008–2009: Randers HK
- 2009–2010: Arvor 29-Pays de Brest
- 2010–2014: Váci NKSE
- 2014−2015: Vasas
- 2015−2016: Alba Fehérvár KC
- 2017−2018: Szent István SE

Szabina Tápai (born 30 January 1986 in Kiskunhalas) is a Hungarian handballer who most recently played for Szent István SE in the second league. In 2016 she decided to retire from professional handball due to an argument with her coach, Rita Deli. Her coach did not like the fact, that Tápai and her family were taking part in a reality show beside other media appearances. One year later she joined the team of Szent István SE. In 2018 she announced her retirement from handball and pregnancy at the same time.

== Achievements ==
- Magyar Kupa:
  - Silver Medalist: 2006
- EHF Cup:
  - Winner: 2005
- Youth European Championship:
  - Bronze Medalist: 2003

== Awards and recognitions ==
- Hungarian Junior Handballer of the Year: 2004

== Personal life ==
She was married to Gábor Kucsera, two time world champion canoeist. They announced in February 2023 that they were getting divorced, but later managed to fix their marriage. They have a son, Bence born in October 2013, and two daughters: Milla, born in November 2018, and Bella, born in 2023, the same year they divorced.
