= Szombathelyi KKA =

Hungarian women's handball club

- Full name: Szombathelyi Kézilabda Klub És Akadémia
- Short name: SZKKA
- Arena: Haladás Sportkomplexum, Szombathely; Arena Savaria, Szombathely
- Capacity: 458; 3,500
- Head coach: Bo Rudgaard
- League: Nemzeti Bajnokság I
- Club colours
Home	Away

Szombathelyi KKA is a Hungarian women's handball club from Szombathely. They currently play in the Nemzeti Bajnokság I/B. Until 2022 they played in the Nemzeti Bajnokság I (NBI), the top level championship in Hungary, after gained promotion in 2019.

Since they are sponsored by Hungast Zrt., the official name for the team is Hungast Szombathelyi KKA.

Location of Szombathelyi KKA

== Kits ==
HOME
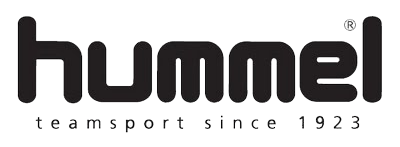
2017–

AWAY
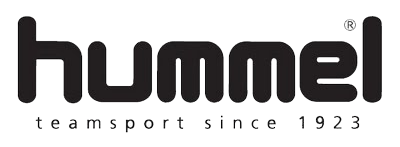
2019–

== Honours ==
=== Domestic competitions ===
Nemzeti Bajnokság I/B:

- Gold: 2018–2019

== Team ==
=== Current squad ===
Squad for the 2026–27 season

Goalkeepers

- 95 (Hungary) Alíz Korsós
- (Hungary) Petra Hlogyik
- (Hungary) Alexa Győri

Wingers
LW

- (Hungary) (Slovakia) Eszter Lengyel
- (Hungary) Olívia Bősze

RW

- (Hungary) Noémi Szőke
- (Serbia) Linea Cocaj
- (Hungary) Dóra Szabó

Line players

- 13 (North Macedonia) Ivana Djatevska
- (Hungary) Alina Fábián
- (Hungary) Petra Gajdos
- (Hungary) Csenge Sass

Back players
Left back

- 9 (Hungary) Laura Tolnai
- (Hungary) Fruzsina Molnár
- (Russia) Kristina Belchikova

Centre backs

- 11 (Hungary) Blanka Pődör
- (Hungary) Luca Táder

Right backs

- (Hungary) Kata Csizmazia
- (Hungary) Emese Ács
- (Montenegro) Ksenia Kuzman

=== Transfers ===
Transfers for the 2026-27 season

Joining

- (Hungary) Petra Hlogyik (GK) from (Germany) Frisch Auf Göppingen
- (Hungary) Luca Táder (LB) from (Hungary) Ferencváros
- (Hungary) Emese Ács (RB) from (Hungary) Ferencváros
- (Hungary) Alina Fábián (LP) from (Hungary) Ferencváros
- (Hungary) Noémi Szőke (RW) from (Hungary) National Academy of Handball
- (Hungary) Petra Gajdos (LP) from (Hungary) Dunaújvárosi Kohász KA

Leaving

- (Hungary) Rebeka Pődör (CB) (to (Romania) SCM Craiova)
- (Hungary) Flóra Szeberényi (LB) to (Hungary) Váci NKSE
- (Hungary) Fanni Török (LW) to (Hungary) Váci NKSE
- (Hungary) Noémi Pásztor (LP) to (Hungary) Mosonmagyaróvári KC SE
- (Hungary) Nikolett Sallai (LW) to (Hungary) Moyra-Budaörs Handball
- (Hungary) Nikolett Varga (RW) retires
- (Hungary) Szonja Szemes (RW) to (Hungary) Kisvárdai KC
- (Serbia) Marija Simic (GK)
- (Hungary) Panna Hornyák (RB)
- (Czech Republic) Valerie Smetková (RB) to (France) Brest Bretagne Handball

=== Staff members ===
- (Hungary) Chairman, head coach: Zoltán Pődör
- (Hungary) Fitness Coach: Tamás Vincze
- (Hungary) Masseur: Máté Tóth

== Notable former players ==
- (Austria) Ines Ivančok
- (Croatia) Dijana Jovetić
- (Croatia) Kristina Prkačin
- (Croatia) Petra Marinovic
- (Serbia) Biljana Bandelier
- (Serbia) Ivana Mitrovic
- (Serbia) Katarina Tomasevic
- (Serbia) Marija Agbaba
- (Serbia) Katarina Stosic
- (Serbia) Katarina Tanaskovic
- (Slovenia) Aneja Beganovič
- (Hungary) Flóra Sipeki
- (Hungary) Apollónia Szmolek
- (Hungary) Luca Dombi
- (Hungary) Anita Kazai
- (Hungary) Adrienn Orbán
- (Hungary) Szabina Mayer
- (Hungary) Luca Szekerczés
- (Hungary) (Ukraine) Judit Balog
- (Ukraine) Lilia Gorilska
- (Brazil) Ana Luiza Aguiar Camelo Borba
- (Brazil) Milena Maria De Souza Menezes
- (Brazil) Naira Morgana Mendes de Almeida
- (Italy) Cristina Gheorghe
- (Russia) Ekaterina Lubyanaya
- (Montenegro) Milica Raicevic
- (Montenegro) Đurđina Malović
- (North Macedonia) Elena Livrinikj
- (North Macedonia) Jovana Kiprijanovska
- (Slovakia) Karin Bujnohova
- (Japan) Natsumi Akiyama

== Coaches ==
- (Hungary) György Marosán (2019–2022)
- (Hungary) Zoltán Pődör (2022–2023, 2026–)
- (Hungary) Gergő Vida (2023–2024)
- (Denmark) Bo Rudgaard Olsen (2024–2025)
- (Hungary) János Gyurka (2025–2026)
