= Flóra Sipeki =

Hungarian handball player (born 1991)

Personal information
- Nationality: Hungarian
- Born: 4 April 1991 (age 35) Budapest, Hungary
- Height: 1.86 m (6 ft 1 in)

Sport
- Sport: Handball
- Position: Goalkeeper
- Current club: Moyra-Budaörs Handball
- Number: 44

Flóra Varjas-Sipeki (born 4 April 1991 in Budapest) is a Hungarian handball goalkeeper who plays for Moyra-Budaörs Handball.

Sipeki previously played for Váci NKSE, Békéscsabai Előre NKSE and Szombathelyi KKA, and with Vác she won the bronze medal of the Hungarian Championship in 2010. Flóra had a key role in the success, as she saved two decisive penalties in the shootout in the bronze final against her next club Békéscsaba.

== Achievements ==
- Nemzeti Bajnokság I:
  - Bronze Medalist: 2010
- Magyar Kupa:
  - Silver Medalist: 2012
