= Orsolya Herr =

Hungarian handball player (born 1984)

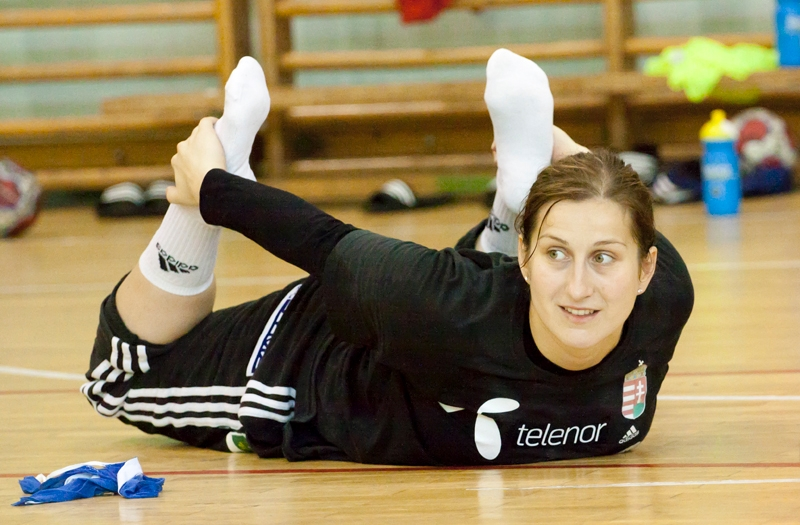
- Herr in 2011

Personal information
- Nationality: Hungarian
- Born: 23 November 1984 (age 41) Tatabánya, Hungary
- Height: 1.76 m (5 ft 9 in)

Sport
- Sport: Handball
- Position: Goalkeeper
- Current club: Retired

Youth career
- Years: Team
- –: Tatabányai TSC
- –2000: Győri Audi ETO KC

Senior clubs
- Years: Team
- 2000–2009: Győri Audi ETO KC
- 2003–2004: → Budapesti Spartacus SC (loan)
- 2009: Podravka Koprivnica
- 2009–2011: Váci NKSE
- 2011–2012: Siófok KC
- 2012–2015: Győri Audi ETO KC
- 2015–2018: Fehérvár KC
National team
Years	Team	Apps	(Gls)
2005–2015	Hungary	152	(1)
Medal record
Representing Hungary
European Championship
Bronze medal – third place	2012 Serbia	Team
Junior World Championship
Silver medal – second place	2003 Macedonia	Team

Orsolya Herr (born 23 November 1984) is a former Hungarian handball goalkeeper.

== Career ==
=== Club ===
Started to play at the age of 12, she was first selected for her hometown club Tatabányai TSC. Two years later she was signed by Hungarian giants Győri ETO KC and got the opportunity to train on one of the best academies in the country.

She debuted in the Hungarian championship in 2001, but her playing minutes remained limited in the forthcoming years and she was eventually loaned to Budapest Kőbányai Spartacus SC for the 2003–2004 season. After her comeback she slowly established herself as a regular, and on 23 March 2005 she won her first cap for the national team as well, when Hungary hosted Slovakia.

Her contract in Győr ran out in summer 2009 and she decided not to extend it. She joined Podravka Koprivnica instead, as a replacement of Paula Ungureanu, who signed to CS Oltchim Râmnicu Vâlcea. In Croatia she got the chance to play together with national teammate Anita Bulath and former Győr player Ana Ðokić, under the guidance of world-class coach Zdravko Zovko.

However, just few months after her move to Koprivnica, financial troubles were revealed and on 4 August the club announced that they release all their foreign players with immediate effect to axe the wage bills.

She has not been a free agent for too long, just two weeks after her dismissal she signed a deal with Vác. Herr told in an interview, that right after the official statement made by Podravka she got many calls and offers, and she had nothing else to do just choose the best one. In the summer of 2011 she moved to ambitious Siófok KC along with other three Hungarian internationals, Szilvia Ábrahám, Bernadett Bódi and Renáta Mörtel. However, just after one season she signed to her former club Győri ETO as a replacement of the retiring Katalin Pálinger.

=== International ===
Herr debuted in the national team in 2005 and a year later she already took part on her first European Championship, finishing fifth. She participated on further two European Championships (2008, 2010) as well as two World Championships (2007, 2009). She was also present on the 2008 Summer Olympics, where Hungary placed fourth.

== Personal ==
One of her two sisters, Anita, is also a Hungarian international handballer, playing in the right back position. They played together in Győr until 2009, and both of them were wanted by Podravka, but Anita finally moved to Germany. In 2012 they reunited in Siófok KC for a brief period, following Anita left her club, VfL Sindelfingen, which went to bankruptcy, and joined the Balaton-side team.

== Achievements ==
- Nemzeti Bajnokság I:
  - Winner: 2005, 2006, 2008, 2009, 2013, 2014
  - Silver Medallsit: 2007, 2015
  - Bronze Medallist: 2003, 2010
- Magyar Kupa:
  - Winner: 2005, 2006, 2007, 2008, 2009, 2013, 2014, 2015
- EHF Champions League:
  - Winner: 2013, 2014
  - Finalist: 2009
  - Semifinalist: 2007, 2008
- EHF Cup Winners' Cup:
  - Finalist: 2006
- EHF Cup:
  - Finalist: 2003, 2005
- Junior European Championship:
  - Silver Medallist: 2002
- Junior World Championship:
  - Silver Medallist: 2003
- European Championship:
  - Bronze Medalist: 2012
