= Ana Amorim =

Brazilian handball player (born 1983)

Ana Carolina Amorim Taleska
Personal information
- Born: 1 April 1983 (age 43) Blumenau, Santa Catarina, Brazil
- Height: 185 cm (73 in)

Sport
- Sport: Handball
- Current club: Alcoa FKC
- –: Kometal Skopje

Ana Carolina Amorim Taleska (born 1 April 1983 in Blumenau, Santa Catarina) is a retired Brazilian handball player.

She is the oldest of three siblings, the youngest being fellow handball player Eduarda Amorim. She participated at the 2004 Summer Olympics in Athens, where the Brazilian team placed seventh. At the time she played club handball for Kometal Skopje in Macedonia.
