= Adrienn Szarka =

Hungarian handball player (born 1991)

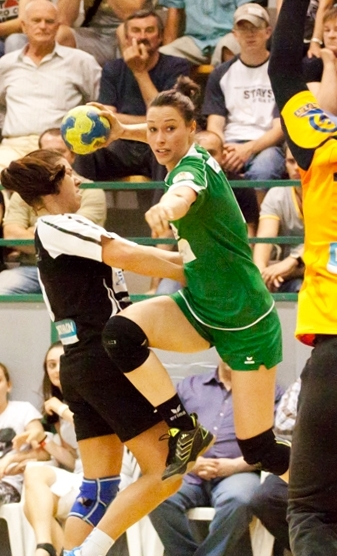
- Szarka in 2011

Personal information
- Full name: Adrienn Szarka
- Nationality: Hungarian
- Born: 28 June 1991 (age 35) Kiskunhalas, Hungary
- Height: 176 cm (69 in)

Sport
- Sport: Handball
- Position: Left Wing
- Current club: Alba Fehérvár KC
- Number: 4

Youth career
- Years: Team
- 2005–2006: Soltvadkerti TE
- 2006–2007: Kiskunhalas NKSE

Senior clubs
- Years: Team
- 2007–2010: Kiskunhalas NKSE
- 2010–2017: Ferencvárosi TC
- 2017–2018: Békéscsabai ENKSE
- 2018–2022: Alba Fehérvár KC

Adrienn Szarka (born 28 June 1991) is a retired Hungarian handballer who plays for Alba Fehérvár KC in left wing position.

== Achievements ==
- Nemzeti Bajnokság I:
  - Winner: 2015
  - Silver Medalist: 2012, 2016, 2017
  - Bronze Medalist: 2011
- Magyar Kupa:
  - Winner: 2017
  - Bronze Medalist: 2009
- EHF Cup Winners' Cup:
  - Winner: 2011, 2012
