= Adrienn Orbán =

Hungarian handball player (born 1986)

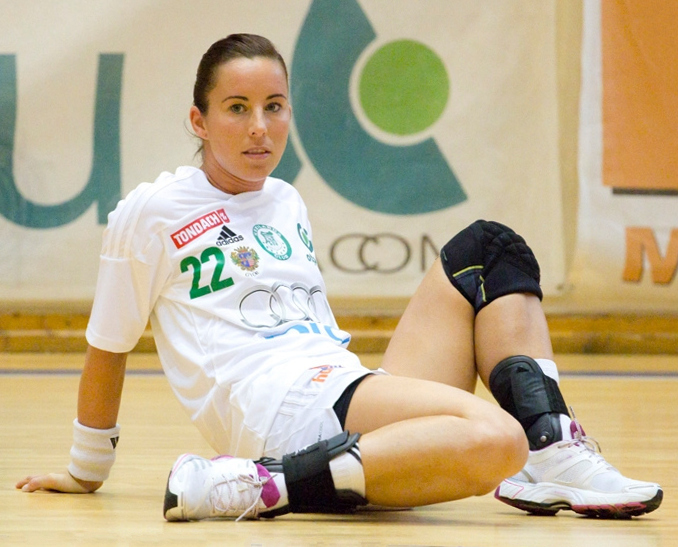

Personal information
- Nationality: Hungarian
- Born: 1 October 1986 (age 40) Győr, Hungary
- Height: 1.68 m (5 ft 6 in)

Sport
- Sport: Handball
- Position: Right wing
- Current club: Szombathelyi KKA
- Number: 18

Senior clubs
- Years: Team
- –2005: Győri ETO KC
- 2004–2005: → Győrújbarát KSC (loan)
- 2005–2006: Komáromi AC
- 2006–2009: Váci NKSE
- 2009–2017: Győri ETO KC
- 2017–2020: Kisvárdai KC
- 2020–2021: Szombathelyi KKA
National team
Years	Team	Apps	(Gls)
2009–	Hungary	48	(66)

Adrienn Orbán (born 1 October 1986) is a Hungarian retired handballer.

== Career ==
Orbán started to play in the Balázs Béla ÁMK, following the path of likes Katalin Pálinger, Anita Görbicz, Renáta Mörtel and the Iváncsik brothers. Her first professional club was the Győri ETO KC, whom she won the Hungarian Youth Championship, but eventually failed to break into the first team, and after a short loan spell in Győrújbarát she switched to second division side Komáromi AC. However, just after one season, she found herself in the top division again, since Váci NKSE secured her services. In Vác she developed into a quality player and at the end of the 2008–2009 season Győri ETO KC re-signed their former player as a backup of Katarina Mravíková.

She made her international debut on 3 March 2009 against Slovenia on the Pannon Cup. In the same year, she was member of the team which finished ninth on the World Championship. Orbán played in seven games and scored five goals.

== Achievements ==
- Nemzeti Bajnokság I:
  - Winner: 2005, 2010, 2011, 2012, 2013, 2014, 2016
- Magyar Kupa:
  - Winner: 2010, 2011, 2012, 2013, 2014, 2015, 2016
- EHF Champions League:
  - Winner: 2013, 2014, 2017
  - Finalist: 2012, 2016
  - Semifinalist: 2010, 2011
- World University Championship:
  - Winner: 2010
