= Annamária Bogdanović =

Hungarian handball player (born 1982)

Personal information
- Full name: Annamária Bogdanović
- Nationality: Hungarian
- Born: 14 April 1982 (age 44) Odorheiu Secuiesc, Romania
- Height: 1.73 m (5 ft 8 in)

Sport
- Sport: Handball
- Position: Middle Back
- Current club: Siófok KC
- Number: 14

Senior clubs
- Years: Team
- –2002: Hajdúnánás SC
- 2002–2011: DVSC
- 2011–2016: Siófok KC
National team
Years	Team	Apps	(Gls)
2006–2009	Hungary	16	(36)

Annamária Bogdanović (also Bogdanovics; née Orbán; born 14 April 1982) is a former Hungarian handballer who played for Siófok KC. She has also been capped for the Hungarian national team. In 2016 she got 4 years suspension by the Hungarian Anti-Doping Group after she provided positive doping samples.

== Personal ==
She is married to former Debreceni VSC footballer Igor Bogdanović. The couple has a daughter, named Tamara.

== Achievements ==
- Nemzeti Bajnokság I:
  - Silver Medallist: 2010, 2011
  - Bronze Medallist: 2009
- Magyar Kupa:
  - Silver Medallist: 2009, 2011
- EHF Cup:
  - Semifinalist: 2006
