= 2017–18 Women's EHF Champions League main round =

This article describes the main round of the 2017–18 Women's EHF Champions League.

== Qualified teams ==
Group	Winners	Runners-up	Third place
A	(Romania) CSM București	(Denmark) Nykøbing Falster	(Slovenia) RK Krim
B	(Hungary) Győri Audi ETO KC	(Russia) Rostov-Don	(Denmark) FC Midtjylland
C	(North Macedonia) HC Vardar	(Hungary) FTC-Rail Cargo Hungaria	(Germany) Thüringer HC
D	(France) Metz Handball	(Montenegro) ŽRK Budućnost	(Germany) SG BBM Bietigheim

== Format ==
In each group, teams played against each other in a double round-robin format, with home and away matches against teams they did not met before. Points obtained in the group stage were taken over. After completion of the group stage matches, the top four teams of each group advanced to the quarterfinals.

== Groups ==
The matchdays were 26–28 January, 2–4 February, 9–11 February, 23–25 February, 2–4 March and 9–11 March 2017.

=== Group 1 ===
Pos	Team	Pld	W	D	L	GF	GA	GD	Pts	Qualification
1	(Hungary) Győri Audi ETO KC	10	8	0	2	281	231	+50	16	Quarterfinals
2	(Russia) Rostov-Don	10	7	1	2	266	232	+34	15	Quarterfinals
3	(Romania) CSM Bucureşti	10	6	1	3	282	246	+36	13	Quarterfinals
4	(Denmark) FC Midtjylland	10	2	2	6	226	251	−25	6	Quarterfinals
5	(Denmark) Nykøbing Falster	10	2	1	7	240	284	−44	5 (Note: Nykøbing Falster 54–53 RK Krim)	
6	(Slovenia) RK Krim	10	2	1	7	243	294	−51	5	

Source: EHF
Rules for classification: See Tiebreakers
Notes:

26 January 2018; 19:30	CSM București (Romania)	28–22	(Hungary) Győri Audi ETO KC	Sala Polivalentă, Bucharest; Attendance: 5,000; Referees: Caçador, Nicolau (POR)
26 January 2018; 19:30	Kurtović 8	(13–11)	Mørk 8	Sala Polivalentă, Bucharest; Attendance: 5,000; Referees: Caçador, Nicolau (POR)
26 January 2018; 19:30	2× (yellow card) 1× (suspension)	Report	2× (yellow card) 1× (suspension)	Sala Polivalentă, Bucharest; Attendance: 5,000; Referees: Caçador, Nicolau (POR)

28 January 2018; 15:20	Nykøbing Falster (Denmark)	25–29	(Russia) Rostov-Don	Næstved Arena, Næstved; Attendance: 2,325; Referees: Erdoğan, Özdeniz (TUR)
28 January 2018; 15:20	J. Westberg 6	(13–15)	three players 5	Næstved Arena, Næstved; Attendance: 2,325; Referees: Erdoğan, Özdeniz (TUR)
28 January 2018; 15:20	2× (yellow card) 2× (suspension)	Report	3× (yellow card) 3× (suspension)	Næstved Arena, Næstved; Attendance: 2,325; Referees: Erdoğan, Özdeniz (TUR)

28 January 2018; 17:00	Krim (Slovenia)	24–23	(Denmark) Midtjylland	Kodeljevo Hall, Ljubljana; Attendance: 1,700; Referees: Brehmer, Skowronek (POL)
28 January 2018; 17:00	Omoregie, Stanko 6	(11–11)	Kristiansen 8	Kodeljevo Hall, Ljubljana; Attendance: 1,700; Referees: Brehmer, Skowronek (POL)
28 January 2018; 17:00	4× (yellow card) 3× (suspension)	Report	4× (yellow card) 2× (suspension)	Kodeljevo Hall, Ljubljana; Attendance: 1,700; Referees: Brehmer, Skowronek (POL)

3 February 2018; 14:00	Rostov-Don (Russia)	29–22	(Slovenia) Krim	Rostov-on-Don Palace of Sports, Rostov-on-Don; Attendance: 1,950; Referees: Vranes, Wenninger (AUT)
3 February 2018; 14:00	Dembélé 8	(13–10)	Omoregie 8	Rostov-on-Don Palace of Sports, Rostov-on-Don; Attendance: 1,950; Referees: Vranes, Wenninger (AUT)
3 February 2018; 14:00	3× (yellow card) 5× (suspension)	Report	3× (yellow card) 4× (suspension)	Rostov-on-Don Palace of Sports, Rostov-on-Don; Attendance: 1,950; Referees: Vranes, Wenninger (AUT)

4 February 2018; 15:00	Midtjylland (Denmark)	26–31	(Romania) CSM București	Ikast-Brande Arena, Ikast; Attendance: 2,580; Referees: Mitrović, Kazanegra (MNE)
4 February 2018; 15:00	Pedersen 6	(13–16)	Neagu 10	Ikast-Brande Arena, Ikast; Attendance: 2,580; Referees: Mitrović, Kazanegra (MNE)
4 February 2018; 15:00	3× (yellow card) 5× (suspension)	Report	2× (yellow card) 5× (suspension)	Ikast-Brande Arena, Ikast; Attendance: 2,580; Referees: Mitrović, Kazanegra (MNE)

5 February 2018; 19:00	Győri Audi ETO KC (Hungary)	32–23	(Denmark) Nykøbing Falster	Audi Aréna, Győr; Attendance: 5,116; Referees: Nikolić, Stojković (SRB)
5 February 2018; 19:00	Groot, Mørk 8	(14–9)	J. Westberg 6	Audi Aréna, Győr; Attendance: 5,116; Referees: Nikolić, Stojković (SRB)
5 February 2018; 19:00	3× (yellow card) 2× (suspension)	Report	3× (yellow card) 1× (suspension)	Audi Aréna, Győr; Attendance: 5,116; Referees: Nikolić, Stojković (SRB)

10 February 2018; 19:00	Krim (Slovenia)	21–32	(Hungary) Győri Audi ETO KC	Kodeljevo Hall, Ljubljana; Attendance: 1,680; Referees: Gasmi, Gasmi (FRA)
10 February 2018; 19:00	Stanko 5	(12–15)	Tomori 6	Kodeljevo Hall, Ljubljana; Attendance: 1,680; Referees: Gasmi, Gasmi (FRA)
10 February 2018; 19:00	3× (yellow card) 2× (suspension)	Report	4× (yellow card) 4× (suspension)	Kodeljevo Hall, Ljubljana; Attendance: 1,680; Referees: Gasmi, Gasmi (FRA)

11 February 2018; 16:50	Nykøbing Falster (Denmark)	21–21	(Denmark) Midtjylland	Næstved Arena, Næstved; Attendance: 2,560; Referees: Schulze, Tönnies (GER)
11 February 2018; 16:50	Iversen 5	(11–10)	Burgaard 8	Næstved Arena, Næstved; Attendance: 2,560; Referees: Schulze, Tönnies (GER)
11 February 2018; 16:50	4× (yellow card) 5× (suspension)	Report	1× (yellow card) 5× (suspension)	Næstved Arena, Næstved; Attendance: 2,560; Referees: Schulze, Tönnies (GER)

11 February 2018; 17:00	CSM București (Romania)	22–22	(Russia) Rostov-Don	Sala Polivalentă, Bucharest; Attendance: 5,000; Referees: Bonaventura, Bonaventura (FRA)
11 February 2018; 17:00	Neagu, Kurtović 5	(11–12)	Vyakhireva 4	Sala Polivalentă, Bucharest; Attendance: 5,000; Referees: Bonaventura, Bonaventura (FRA)
11 February 2018; 17:00	2× (yellow card) 2× (suspension)	Report	2× (yellow card) 4× (suspension) 1× (red card)	Sala Polivalentă, Bucharest; Attendance: 5,000; Referees: Bonaventura, Bonaventura (FRA)

24 February 2018; 14:00	Rostov-Don (Russia)	32–22	(Denmark) Nykøbing Falster	Rostov-on-Don Palace of Sports, Rostov-on-Don; Attendance: 3,000; Referees: Ilieva, Karbeska (MKD)
24 February 2018; 14:00	Vyakhireva 8	(14–13)	C. Kristiansen 7	Rostov-on-Don Palace of Sports, Rostov-on-Don; Attendance: 3,000; Referees: Ilieva, Karbeska (MKD)
24 February 2018; 14:00	3× (yellow card)	Report	2× (yellow card) 2× (suspension)	Rostov-on-Don Palace of Sports, Rostov-on-Don; Attendance: 3,000; Referees: Ilieva, Karbeska (MKD)

25 February 2018; 15:00	Midtjylland (Denmark)	24–24	(Slovenia) Krim	Ikast-Brande Arena, Ikast; Attendance: 1,541; Referees: Christidi, Papamattheou (GRE)
25 February 2018; 15:00	Augustesen 7	(12–13)	Omoregie 7	Ikast-Brande Arena, Ikast; Attendance: 1,541; Referees: Christidi, Papamattheou (GRE)
25 February 2018; 15:00	4× (yellow card) 2× (suspension)	Report	3× (yellow card) 2× (suspension)	Ikast-Brande Arena, Ikast; Attendance: 1,541; Referees: Christidi, Papamattheou (GRE)

26 February 2018; 19:00	Győri Audi ETO KC (Hungary)	28–24	(Romania) CSM București	Audi Aréna, Győr; Attendance: 5,409; Referees: Mandak, Rudinsky (SVK)
26 February 2018; 19:00	Görbicz 10	(13–11)	Neagu, Gulldén 6	Audi Aréna, Győr; Attendance: 5,409; Referees: Mandak, Rudinsky (SVK)
26 February 2018; 19:00	3× (yellow card) 4× (suspension)	Report	2× (yellow card) 2× (suspension)	Audi Aréna, Győr; Attendance: 5,409; Referees: Mandak, Rudinsky (SVK)

3 March 2018; 13:30	Nykøbing Falster (Denmark)	24–32	(Hungary) Győri Audi ETO KC	Næstved Arena, Næstved; Attendance: 2,375; Referees: Álvarez, López (ESP)
3 March 2018; 13:30	J. Westberg 7	(10–17)	Groot 7	Næstved Arena, Næstved; Attendance: 2,375; Referees: Álvarez, López (ESP)
3 March 2018; 13:30	3× (yellow card) 3× (suspension)	Report	3× (yellow card) 3× (suspension)	Næstved Arena, Næstved; Attendance: 2,375; Referees: Álvarez, López (ESP)

3 March 2018; 19:30	Krim (Slovenia)	26–35	(Russia) Rostov-Don	Kodeljevo Hall, Ljubljana; Attendance: 1,400; Referees: Antić, Jakovljević (SRB)
3 March 2018; 19:30	Stanko 6	(12–21)	Dembélé 7	Kodeljevo Hall, Ljubljana; Attendance: 1,400; Referees: Antić, Jakovljević (SRB)
3 March 2018; 19:30	2× (yellow card) 1× (suspension)	Report	2× (yellow card) 3× (suspension)	Kodeljevo Hall, Ljubljana; Attendance: 1,400; Referees: Antić, Jakovljević (SRB)

4 March 2018; 17:30	CSM București (Romania)	29–24	(Denmark) Midtjylland	Sala Polivalentă, Bucharest; Attendance: 5,000; Referees: Panayides, Andreou (CYP)
4 March 2018; 17:30	Neagu, Kurtović 6	(13–12)	Kristiansen 6	Sala Polivalentă, Bucharest; Attendance: 5,000; Referees: Panayides, Andreou (CYP)
4 March 2018; 17:30	2× (yellow card)	Report	4× (yellow card) 3× (suspension)	Sala Polivalentă, Bucharest; Attendance: 5,000; Referees: Panayides, Andreou (CYP)

10 March 2018; 14:00	Rostov-Don (Russia)	25–24	(Romania) CSM București	Rostov-on-Don Palace of Sports, Rostov-on-Don; Attendance: 2,900; Referees: Brehmer, Skowronek (POL)
10 March 2018; 14:00	Dembélé, Managarova 4	(9–12)	Neagu 6	Rostov-on-Don Palace of Sports, Rostov-on-Don; Attendance: 2,900; Referees: Brehmer, Skowronek (POL)
10 March 2018; 14:00	4× (yellow card) 3× (suspension) 1× (red card)	Report	3× (yellow card) 2× (suspension)	Rostov-on-Don Palace of Sports, Rostov-on-Don; Attendance: 2,900; Referees: Brehmer, Skowronek (POL)

10 March 2018; 17:30	Győri Audi ETO KC (Hungary)	34–25	(Slovenia) Krim	Audi Aréna, Győr; Attendance: 5,172; Referees: Mitrevski, Todorovski (MKD)
10 March 2018; 17:30	Oftedal 11	(17–12)	Koren 9	Audi Aréna, Győr; Attendance: 5,172; Referees: Mitrevski, Todorovski (MKD)
10 March 2018; 17:30	4× (yellow card) 4× (suspension) 1× (red card)	Report	3× (yellow card) 4× (suspension)	Audi Aréna, Győr; Attendance: 5,172; Referees: Mitrevski, Todorovski (MKD)

10 March 2018; 19:00	Midtjylland (Denmark)	24–20	(Denmark) Nykøbing Falster	Ikast-Brande Arena, Ikast; Attendance: 2,254; Referees: Freitas, Carvalho (POR)
10 March 2018; 19:00	Burgaard 7	(10–9)	J. Westberg 8	Ikast-Brande Arena, Ikast; Attendance: 2,254; Referees: Freitas, Carvalho (POR)
10 March 2018; 19:00	4× (yellow card) 1× (suspension)	Report	2× (yellow card) 4× (suspension)	Ikast-Brande Arena, Ikast; Attendance: 2,254; Referees: Freitas, Carvalho (POR)

=== Group 2 ===
Pos	Team	Pld	W	D	L	GF	GA	GD	Pts	Qualification
1	(North Macedonia) HC Vardar	10	9	0	1	301	245	+56	18	Quarterfinals
2	(France) Metz Handball	10	7	0	3	269	256	+13	14	Quarterfinals
3	(Hungary) FTC-Rail Cargo Hungaria	10	6	0	4	282	265	+17	12	Quarterfinals
4	(Montenegro) ŽRK Budućnost	10	4	0	6	251	260	−9	8	Quarterfinals
5	(Germany) SG BBM Bietigheim	10	2	0	8	242	294	−52	4 (Note: SG BBM Bietigheim 57–52 Thüringer HC)	
6	(Germany) Thüringer HC	10	2	0	8	257	282	−25	4	

Source: EHF
Rules for classification: See Tiebreakers
Notes:

27 January 2018; 14:00	Thüringer HC (Germany)	28–26	(Germany) SG BBM Bietigheim	Wiedigsburghalle, Nordhausen; Attendance: 1,400; Referees: Kurtagic, Wetterwik (SWE)
27 January 2018; 14:00	Luzumová 10	(12–8)	Malestein 6	Wiedigsburghalle, Nordhausen; Attendance: 1,400; Referees: Kurtagic, Wetterwik (SWE)
27 January 2018; 14:00	4× (yellow card) 6× (suspension) 1× (red card)	Report	4× (yellow card) 8× (suspension)	Wiedigsburghalle, Nordhausen; Attendance: 1,400; Referees: Kurtagic, Wetterwik (SWE)

27 January 2018; 17:30	HC Vardar (North Macedonia)	29–23	(France) Metz Handball	Jane Sandanski Arena, Skopje; Attendance: 3,800; Referees: Tzaferopoulos, Bethmann (GRE)
27 January 2018; 17:30	Cvijić 7	(15–9)	Sajka 6	Jane Sandanski Arena, Skopje; Attendance: 3,800; Referees: Tzaferopoulos, Bethmann (GRE)
27 January 2018; 17:30	3× (yellow card) 2× (suspension)	Report	3× (yellow card) 3× (suspension)	Jane Sandanski Arena, Skopje; Attendance: 3,800; Referees: Tzaferopoulos, Bethmann (GRE)

28 January 2018; 15:00	FTC-Rail Cargo Hungaria (Hungary)	34–26	(Montenegro) Budućnost	OBO Aréna, Dabas; Attendance: 2,400; Referees: Brkic, Jusufhodzic (AUT)
28 January 2018; 15:00	Van der Heijden 7	(19–18)	Grbić 5	OBO Aréna, Dabas; Attendance: 2,400; Referees: Brkic, Jusufhodzic (AUT)
28 January 2018; 15:00	2× (yellow card) 3× (suspension)	Report	3× (yellow card) 3× (suspension)	OBO Aréna, Dabas; Attendance: 2,400; Referees: Brkic, Jusufhodzic (AUT)

3 February 2018; 19:00	Budućnost (Montenegro)	29–21	(Germany) Thüringer HC	Morača Sports Center, Podgorica; Attendance: 1,750; Referees: Baranowsky, Lemanowicz (POL)
3 February 2018; 19:00	Malović 7	(15–12)	Luzumová 8	Morača Sports Center, Podgorica; Attendance: 1,750; Referees: Baranowsky, Lemanowicz (POL)
3 February 2018; 19:00	3× (yellow card) 1× (suspension)	Report	4× (yellow card) 3× (suspension)	Morača Sports Center, Podgorica; Attendance: 1,750; Referees: Baranowsky, Lemanowicz (POL)

4 February 2018; 17:00	SG BBM Bietigheim (Germany)	26–38	(North Macedonia) HC Vardar	Arena Ludwigsburg, Ludwigsburg; Attendance: 1,581; Referees: Alpaidze, Berezkina (RUS)
4 February 2018; 17:00	Lauenroth, Rozemalen 7	(14–16)	Penezić 8	Arena Ludwigsburg, Ludwigsburg; Attendance: 1,581; Referees: Alpaidze, Berezkina (RUS)
4 February 2018; 17:00	3× (yellow card) 1× (suspension)	Report	1× (yellow card) 2× (suspension)	Arena Ludwigsburg, Ludwigsburg; Attendance: 1,581; Referees: Alpaidze, Berezkina (RUS)

4 February 2018; 17:00	Metz Handball (France)	28–25	(Hungary) FTC-Rail Cargo Hungaria	Arènes de Metz, Metz; Attendance: 4,500; Referees: Arntsen, Røen (NOR)
4 February 2018; 17:00	Gros 10	(13–10)	Lukács 7	Arènes de Metz, Metz; Attendance: 4,500; Referees: Arntsen, Røen (NOR)
4 February 2018; 17:00	2× (yellow card) 3× (suspension)	Report	4× (yellow card) 3× (suspension)	Arènes de Metz, Metz; Attendance: 4,500; Referees: Arntsen, Røen (NOR)

10 February 2018; 15:00	HC Vardar (North Macedonia)	31–24	(Montenegro) Budućnost	Jane Sandanski Arena, Skopje; Attendance: 3,000; Referees: Kijauskaite, Žalienė (LTU)
10 February 2018; 15:00	Penezić 8	(19–8)	Brnović 6	Jane Sandanski Arena, Skopje; Attendance: 3,000; Referees: Kijauskaite, Žalienė (LTU)
10 February 2018; 15:00	3× (yellow card) 4× (suspension)	Report	3× (yellow card) 7× (suspension)	Jane Sandanski Arena, Skopje; Attendance: 3,000; Referees: Kijauskaite, Žalienė (LTU)

10 February 2018; 16:30	FTC-Rail Cargo Hungaria (Hungary)	31–22	(Germany) SG BBM Bietigheim	OBO Aréna, Dabas; Attendance: 2,400; Referees: Panayides, Andreou (CYP)
10 February 2018; 16:30	Van der Heijden 5	(14–8)	Lauenroth 8	OBO Aréna, Dabas; Attendance: 2,400; Referees: Panayides, Andreou (CYP)
10 February 2018; 16:30	3× (yellow card) 2× (suspension)	Report	3× (yellow card) 3× (suspension)	OBO Aréna, Dabas; Attendance: 2,400; Referees: Panayides, Andreou (CYP)

11 February 2018; 14:00	Thüringer HC (Germany)	29–31	(France) Metz Handball	Wiedigsburghalle, Nordhausen; Attendance: 1,500; Referees: Hermann, Madsen (DEN)
11 February 2018; 14:00	Luzumová 12	(14–15)	Smits 10	Wiedigsburghalle, Nordhausen; Attendance: 1,500; Referees: Hermann, Madsen (DEN)
11 February 2018; 14:00	2× (yellow card) 2× (suspension)	Report	3× (yellow card) 4× (suspension)	Wiedigsburghalle, Nordhausen; Attendance: 1,500; Referees: Hermann, Madsen (DEN)

24 February 2018; 19:30	Budućnost (Montenegro)	23–24	(Hungary) FTC-Rail Cargo Hungaria	Morača Sports Center, Podgorica; Attendance: 2,100; Referees: Zotin, Volodkov (RUS)
24 February 2018; 19:30	Raičević 8	(12–12)	three players 4	Morača Sports Center, Podgorica; Attendance: 2,100; Referees: Zotin, Volodkov (RUS)
24 February 2018; 19:30	3× (yellow card) 1× (suspension)	Report	4× (yellow card) 4× (suspension)	Morača Sports Center, Podgorica; Attendance: 2,100; Referees: Zotin, Volodkov (RUS)

25 February 2018; 15:00	Metz Handball (France)	24–22	(North Macedonia) HC Vardar	Arènes de Metz, Metz; Attendance: 4,500; Referees: Leszczynski, Piechota (POL)
25 February 2018; 15:00	Zaadi 8	(10–10)	Lekić 5	Arènes de Metz, Metz; Attendance: 4,500; Referees: Leszczynski, Piechota (POL)
25 February 2018; 15:00	3× (yellow card) 2× (suspension)	Report	3× (yellow card) 4× (suspension)	Arènes de Metz, Metz; Attendance: 4,500; Referees: Leszczynski, Piechota (POL)

25 February 2018; 17:00	SG BBM Bietigheim (Germany)	21–34	(Germany) Thüringer HC	Arena Ludwigsburg, Ludwigsburg; Attendance: 1,187; Referees: Bennani, Bennani (SWE)
25 February 2018; 17:00	Lauenroth 5	(13–17)	Luzumová 10	Arena Ludwigsburg, Ludwigsburg; Attendance: 1,187; Referees: Bennani, Bennani (SWE)
25 February 2018; 17:00	3× (yellow card) 2× (suspension)	Report	2× (yellow card) 3× (suspension)	Arena Ludwigsburg, Ludwigsburg; Attendance: 1,187; Referees: Bennani, Bennani (SWE)

2 March 2018; 19:00	HC Vardar (North Macedonia)	30–22	(Germany) SG BBM Bietigheim	Jane Sandanski Arena, Skopje; Attendance: 2,500; Referees: Vranes, Wenninger (AUT)
2 March 2018; 19:00	Lekić 8	(13–8)	three players 4	Jane Sandanski Arena, Skopje; Attendance: 2,500; Referees: Vranes, Wenninger (AUT)
2 March 2018; 19:00	1× (yellow card) 2× (suspension)	Report	4× (yellow card) 5× (suspension)	Jane Sandanski Arena, Skopje; Attendance: 2,500; Referees: Vranes, Wenninger (AUT)

3 March 2018; 15:00	FTC-Rail Cargo Hungaria (Hungary)	29–27	(France) Metz Handball	OBO Aréna, Dabas; Attendance: 2,498; Referees: Lah, Sok (SLO)
3 March 2018; 15:00	three players 6	(13–9)	three players 5	OBO Aréna, Dabas; Attendance: 2,498; Referees: Lah, Sok (SLO)
3 March 2018; 15:00	3× (yellow card) 6× (suspension) 1× (red card)	Report	2× (yellow card) 2× (suspension)	OBO Aréna, Dabas; Attendance: 2,498; Referees: Lah, Sok (SLO)

4 March 2018; 14:00	Thüringer HC (Germany)	24–25	(Montenegro) Budućnost	Wiedigsburghalle, Nordhausen; Attendance: 1,500; Referees: Brunovský, Čanda (SVK)
4 March 2018; 14:00	Niederwieser 7	(11–12)	Jauković 7	Wiedigsburghalle, Nordhausen; Attendance: 1,500; Referees: Brunovský, Čanda (SVK)
4 March 2018; 14:00	2× (yellow card) 2× (suspension)	Report	3× (yellow card) 4× (suspension)	Wiedigsburghalle, Nordhausen; Attendance: 1,500; Referees: Brunovský, Čanda (SVK)

10 March 2018; 19:30	Budućnost (Montenegro)	25–30	(North Macedonia) HC Vardar	Morača Sports Center, Podgorica; Attendance: 2,300; Referees: Brunner, Salah (SUI)
10 March 2018; 19:30	Raičević 10	(12–15)	Penezić 10	Morača Sports Center, Podgorica; Attendance: 2,300; Referees: Brunner, Salah (SUI)
10 March 2018; 19:30	2× (yellow card) 7× (suspension)	Report	3× (yellow card) 6× (suspension)	Morača Sports Center, Podgorica; Attendance: 2,300; Referees: Brunner, Salah (SUI)

11 March 2018; 17:00	SG BBM Bietigheim (Germany)	27–23	(Hungary) FTC-Rail Cargo Hungaria	Arena Ludwigsburg, Ludwigsburg; Attendance: 1,395; Referees: Tzaferopoulos, Bethmann (GRE)
11 March 2018; 17:00	Hundahl, Woller 5	(16–11)	Jovanović 7	Arena Ludwigsburg, Ludwigsburg; Attendance: 1,395; Referees: Tzaferopoulos, Bethmann (GRE)
11 March 2018; 17:00	2× (yellow card) 1× (suspension)	Report	4× (yellow card)	Arena Ludwigsburg, Ludwigsburg; Attendance: 1,395; Referees: Tzaferopoulos, Bethmann (GRE)

11 March 2018; 17:00	Metz Handball (France)	35–29	(Germany) Thüringer HC	Arènes de Metz, Metz; Attendance: 4,159; Referees: Alpaidze, Berezkina (RUS)
11 March 2018; 17:00	Houette 8	(17–19)	Luzumová 9	Arènes de Metz, Metz; Attendance: 4,159; Referees: Alpaidze, Berezkina (RUS)
11 March 2018; 17:00	3× (yellow card) 1× (suspension)	Report	3× (yellow card) 2× (suspension)	Arènes de Metz, Metz; Attendance: 4,159; Referees: Alpaidze, Berezkina (RUS)
