= 2017–18 Women's EHF Champions League group stage =

This article describes the group stage of the 2017–18 Women's EHF Champions League.

== Draw ==
The draw was held on 30 June 2017.

=== Seedings ===
The seedings were announced on 27 June 2017.

Pot 1	Pot 2	Pot 3	Pot 4
(Hungary) Győri Audi ETO KC (Montenegro) ŽRK Budućnost (North Macedonia) ŽRK Vardar (Romania) CSM București	(Norway) Larvik HK (Russia) Rostov-Don (Denmark) Nykøbing Falster (France) Metz Handball	(Germany) SG BBM Bietigheim (Slovenia) RK Krim (Hungary) FTC-Rail Cargo Hungaria (Denmark) FC Midtjylland	(Poland) Vistal Gdynia (France) Brest Bretagne Handball; Qualifier 1 Qualifier 2

== Groups ==
The matchdays were 6–8 October, 13–15 October, 20–22 October, 3–5 November, 10–12 November and 17–19 November 2017.

=== Group A ===
Pos	Team	Pld	W	D	L	GF	GA	GD	Pts	Qualification
1	(Romania) CSM Bucureşti	6	5	0	1	192	144	+48	10	Main round
2	(Denmark) Nykøbing Falster	6	4	0	2	168	163	+5	8	Main round
3	(Slovenia) RK Krim	6	3	0	3	159	158	+1	6	Main round
4	(Poland) Vistal Gdynia	6	0	0	6	135	189	−54	0	EHF Cup

Source: EHF
Rules for classification: See Tiebreakers

7 October 2017; 14:30	Nykøbing Falster (Denmark)	27–21	(Poland) Vistal Gdynia	Næstved Arena, Næstved; Attendance: 2,035; Referees: Kijauskaitė, Žalienė (LTU)
7 October 2017; 14:30	J. Westberg 8	(14–10)	Borysławska, Zych 7	Næstved Arena, Næstved; Attendance: 2,035; Referees: Kijauskaitė, Žalienė (LTU)
7 October 2017; 14:30	3× (yellow card) 4× (suspension)	Report	2× (yellow card) 7× (suspension) 1× (red card)	Næstved Arena, Næstved; Attendance: 2,035; Referees: Kijauskaitė, Žalienė (LTU)

7 October 2017; 19:00	CSM București (Romania)	30–18	(Slovenia) RK Krim	Sala Polivalentă, Bucharest; Attendance: 4,627; Referees: Arntsen, Røen (NOR)
7 October 2017; 19:00	Neagu 8	(15–7)	Barič, Tsakalou 4	Sala Polivalentă, Bucharest; Attendance: 4,627; Referees: Arntsen, Røen (NOR)
7 October 2017; 19:00	2× (yellow card) 3× (suspension)	Report	4× (yellow card) 4× (suspension)	Sala Polivalentă, Bucharest; Attendance: 4,627; Referees: Arntsen, Røen (NOR)

11 October 2017; 20:00	Vistal Gdynia (Poland)	23–34	(Romania) CSM București	Gdynia Sports Arena, Gdynia; Attendance: 700; Referees: Alpaidze, Berezkina (RUS)
11 October 2017; 20:00	Uścinowicz 7	(9–18)	Neagu 12	Gdynia Sports Arena, Gdynia; Attendance: 700; Referees: Alpaidze, Berezkina (RUS)
11 October 2017; 20:00	2× (yellow card) 5× (suspension)	Report	2× (yellow card) 4× (suspension)	Gdynia Sports Arena, Gdynia; Attendance: 700; Referees: Alpaidze, Berezkina (RUS)

14 October 2017; 15:00	RK Krim (Slovenia)	27–26	(Denmark) Nykøbing Falster	Kodeljevo Hall, Ljubljana; Attendance: 800; Referees: Schulze, Tönnies (GER)
14 October 2017; 15:00	Stanko 9	(15–15)	K. Kristiansen 7	Kodeljevo Hall, Ljubljana; Attendance: 800; Referees: Schulze, Tönnies (GER)
14 October 2017; 15:00	3× (yellow card) 1× (suspension)	Report	2× (yellow card) 5× (suspension)	Kodeljevo Hall, Ljubljana; Attendance: 800; Referees: Schulze, Tönnies (GER)

22 October 2017; 16:50	Nykøbing Falster (Denmark)	25–22	(Romania) CSM București	Næstved Arena, Næstved; Attendance: 2,876; Referees: Jurinović, Mrvica (CRO)
22 October 2017; 16:50	K. Kristiansen, J. Westberg 6	(13–14)	Gulldén 6	Næstved Arena, Næstved; Attendance: 2,876; Referees: Jurinović, Mrvica (CRO)
22 October 2017; 16:50	3× (yellow card) 1× (suspension)	Report	2× (yellow card) 3× (suspension)	Næstved Arena, Næstved; Attendance: 2,876; Referees: Jurinović, Mrvica (CRO)

25 October 2017; 18:30	Vistal Gdynia (Poland)	19–29	(Slovenia) RK Krim	Gdynia Sports Arena, Gdynia; Attendance: 700; Referees: Herczeg, Südi (HUN)
25 October 2017; 18:30	Szarawaga 5	(10–11)	Barič 6	Gdynia Sports Arena, Gdynia; Attendance: 700; Referees: Herczeg, Südi (HUN)
25 October 2017; 18:30	3× (yellow card) 1× (suspension)	Report	2× (yellow card) 3× (suspension)	Gdynia Sports Arena, Gdynia; Attendance: 700; Referees: Herczeg, Südi (HUN)

4 November 2017; 15:00	RK Krim (Slovenia)	29–22	(Poland) Vistal Gdynia	Kodeljevo Hall, Ljubljana; Attendance: 900; Referees: Bennani, Bennani (SWE)
4 November 2017; 15:00	Barič, Stanko 6	(16–11)	Zych 5	Kodeljevo Hall, Ljubljana; Attendance: 900; Referees: Bennani, Bennani (SWE)
4 November 2017; 15:00	2× (yellow card) 9× (suspension)	Report	3× (yellow card) 5× (suspension)	Kodeljevo Hall, Ljubljana; Attendance: 900; Referees: Bennani, Bennani (SWE)

4 November 2017; 15:00	CSM București (Romania)	39–26	(Denmark) Nykøbing Falster	Sala Polivalentă Dinamo, Bucharest; Attendance: 2,000; Referees: Bonaventura, Bonaventura (FRA)
4 November 2017; 15:00	Neagu, Curea 7	(18–12)	J. Westberg 8	Sala Polivalentă Dinamo, Bucharest; Attendance: 2,000; Referees: Bonaventura, Bonaventura (FRA)
4 November 2017; 15:00	1× (yellow card) 6× (suspension)	Report	3× (yellow card) 2× (suspension)	Sala Polivalentă Dinamo, Bucharest; Attendance: 2,000; Referees: Bonaventura, Bonaventura (FRA)

10 November 2017; 19:00	Vistal Gdynia (Poland)	28–36	(Denmark) Nykøbing Falster	Gdynia Sports Arena, Gdynia; Attendance: 700; Referees: Antić, Jakovljević (SRB)
10 November 2017; 19:00	Janiszewska, Kulwińska 6	(10–15)	J. Westberg 11	Gdynia Sports Arena, Gdynia; Attendance: 700; Referees: Antić, Jakovljević (SRB)
10 November 2017; 19:00	2× (yellow card) 2× (suspension)	Report	2× (yellow card) 2× (suspension)	Gdynia Sports Arena, Gdynia; Attendance: 700; Referees: Antić, Jakovljević (SRB)

11 November 2017; 15:00	RK Krim (Slovenia)	30–33	(Romania) CSM București	Kodeljevo Hall, Ljubljana; Attendance: 1,800; Referees: Kijauskaitė, Žalienė (LTU)
11 November 2017; 15:00	Benko 7	(16–17)	Neagu 9	Kodeljevo Hall, Ljubljana; Attendance: 1,800; Referees: Kijauskaitė, Žalienė (LTU)
11 November 2017; 15:00	3× (yellow card) 2× (suspension)	Report	1× (yellow card) 5× (suspension)	Kodeljevo Hall, Ljubljana; Attendance: 1,800; Referees: Kijauskaitė, Žalienė (LTU)

19 November 2017; 15:00	CSM București (Romania)	34–22	(Poland) Vistal Gdynia	Sala Polivalentă Dinamo, Bucharest; Attendance: 2,200; Referees: Vranes, Wenninger (AUT)
19 November 2017; 15:00	Curea, Hagman 5	(17–14)	Janiszewska, Zych 4	Sala Polivalentă Dinamo, Bucharest; Attendance: 2,200; Referees: Vranes, Wenninger (AUT)
19 November 2017; 15:00	3× (yellow card) 4× (suspension)	Report	3× (yellow card) 2× (suspension)	Sala Polivalentă Dinamo, Bucharest; Attendance: 2,200; Referees: Vranes, Wenninger (AUT)

19 November 2017; 15:10	Nykøbing Falster (Denmark)	28–26	(Slovenia) RK Krim	Næstved Arena, Næstved; Attendance: 2,765; Referees: Ilieva, Karbeska (MKD)
19 November 2017; 15:10	J. Westberg 5	(11–12)	Koren, Peraica 5	Næstved Arena, Næstved; Attendance: 2,765; Referees: Ilieva, Karbeska (MKD)
19 November 2017; 15:10	4× (yellow card)	Report	3× (yellow card) 2× (suspension)	Næstved Arena, Næstved; Attendance: 2,765; Referees: Ilieva, Karbeska (MKD)

=== Group B ===
Pos	Team	Pld	W	D	L	GF	GA	GD	Pts	Qualification
1	(Hungary) Győri Audi ETO KC	6	5	0	1	153	126	+27	10	Main round
2	(Russia) Rostov-Don	6	4	0	2	149	138	+11	8	Main round
3	(Denmark) FC Midtjylland	6	3	0	3	134	147	−13	6	Main round
4	(France) Brest Bretagne Handball	6	0	0	6	132	157	−25	0	EHF Cup

Source: EHF
Rules for classification: See Tiebreakers

7 October 2017; 15:00	Rostov-Don (Russia)	26–24	(France) Brest Bretagne Handball	Rostov-on-Don Palace of Sports, Rostov-on-Don; Attendance: 2,500; Referees: Jurinović, Mrvica (CRO)
7 October 2017; 15:00	Makeyeva 5	(14–13)	Stoiljković 6	Rostov-on-Don Palace of Sports, Rostov-on-Don; Attendance: 2,500; Referees: Jurinović, Mrvica (CRO)
7 October 2017; 15:00	4× (yellow card)	Report	3× (yellow card) 3× (suspension)	Rostov-on-Don Palace of Sports, Rostov-on-Don; Attendance: 2,500; Referees: Jurinović, Mrvica (CRO)

7 October 2017; 19:30	Győri Audi ETO KC (Hungary)	27–16	(Denmark) FC Midtjylland	Audi Aréna, Győr; Attendance: 5,157; Referees: Brunovský, Čanda (SVK)
7 October 2017; 19:30	Görbicz 6	(15–8)	Pedersen 4	Audi Aréna, Győr; Attendance: 5,157; Referees: Brunovský, Čanda (SVK)
7 October 2017; 19:30	2× (yellow card) 2× (suspension)	Report	3× (yellow card) 2× (suspension)	Audi Aréna, Győr; Attendance: 5,157; Referees: Brunovský, Čanda (SVK)

15 October 2017; 15:00	Brest Bretagne Handball (France)	23–26	(Hungary) Győri Audi ETO KC	Brest Arena, Brest; Attendance: 3,433; Referees: Kurtagic, Wetterwik (SWE)
15 October 2017; 15:00	Geiger 6	(10–13)	Groot 6	Brest Arena, Brest; Attendance: 3,433; Referees: Kurtagic, Wetterwik (SWE)
15 October 2017; 15:00	3× (yellow card) 5× (suspension)	Report	3× (yellow card) 5× (suspension)	Brest Arena, Brest; Attendance: 3,433; Referees: Kurtagic, Wetterwik (SWE)

15 October 2017; 16:30	FC Midtjylland (Denmark)	24–21	(Russia) Rostov-Don	Ikast-Brande Arena, Ikast; Attendance: 1,652; Referees: Opava, Válek (CZE)
15 October 2017; 16:30	three players 5	(11–10)	Vyakhireva 4	Ikast-Brande Arena, Ikast; Attendance: 1,652; Referees: Opava, Válek (CZE)
15 October 2017; 16:30	3× (yellow card) 3× (suspension)	Report	2× (yellow card) 1× (suspension)	Ikast-Brande Arena, Ikast; Attendance: 1,652; Referees: Opava, Válek (CZE)

20 October 2017; 19:00	Brest Bretagne Handball (France)	22–23	(Denmark) FC Midtjylland	Brest Arena, Brest; Attendance: 1,043; Referees: Tzaferopoulos, Bethmann (GRE)
20 October 2017; 19:00	Geiger 5	(10–12)	Burgaard 10	Brest Arena, Brest; Attendance: 1,043; Referees: Tzaferopoulos, Bethmann (GRE)
20 October 2017; 19:00	2× (yellow card) 3× (suspension)	Report	2× (yellow card) 1× (suspension)	Brest Arena, Brest; Attendance: 1,043; Referees: Tzaferopoulos, Bethmann (GRE)

21 October 2017; 16:00	Rostov-Don (Russia)	23–22	(Hungary) Győri Audi ETO KC	Rostov-on-Don Palace of Sports, Rostov-on-Don; Attendance: 2,400; Referees: Marić, Mašić (SRB)
21 October 2017; 16:00	Belo 7	(12–12)	Oftedal 5	Rostov-on-Don Palace of Sports, Rostov-on-Don; Attendance: 2,400; Referees: Marić, Mašić (SRB)
21 October 2017; 16:00	3× (yellow card) 1× (suspension)	Report	4× (yellow card) 4× (suspension)	Rostov-on-Don Palace of Sports, Rostov-on-Don; Attendance: 2,400; Referees: Marić, Mašić (SRB)

4 November 2017; 13:30	FC Midtjylland (Denmark)	27–23	(France) Brest Bretagne Handball	Ikast-Brande Arena, Ikast; Attendance: 1,560; Referees: Arntsen, Røen (NOR)
4 November 2017; 13:30	Kristiansen 12	(12–7)	three players 4	Ikast-Brande Arena, Ikast; Attendance: 1,560; Referees: Arntsen, Røen (NOR)
4 November 2017; 13:30	2× (yellow card) 2× (suspension)	Report	2× (yellow card) 3× (suspension)	Ikast-Brande Arena, Ikast; Attendance: 1,560; Referees: Arntsen, Røen (NOR)

6 November 2017; 19:00	Győri Audi ETO KC (Hungary)	25–23	(Russia) Rostov-Don	Audi Aréna, Győr; Attendance: 5,000; Referees: Baranowski, Lemanowicz (POL)
6 November 2017; 19:00	Amorim, Görbicz 5	(13–9)	Belo, Dembélé 5	Audi Aréna, Győr; Attendance: 5,000; Referees: Baranowski, Lemanowicz (POL)
6 November 2017; 19:00	3× (yellow card) 3× (suspension)	Report	3× (yellow card) 5× (suspension)	Audi Aréna, Győr; Attendance: 5,000; Referees: Baranowski, Lemanowicz (POL)

11 November 2017; 15:00	Brest Bretagne Handball (France)	23–29	(Russia) Rostov-Don	Brest Arena, Brest; Attendance: 2,775; Referees: Pavićević, Ražnatović (MNE)
11 November 2017; 15:00	Geiger 6	(14–15)	Managarova 8	Brest Arena, Brest; Attendance: 2,775; Referees: Pavićević, Ražnatović (MNE)
11 November 2017; 15:00	2× (yellow card) 2× (suspension)	Report	3× (yellow card) 3× (suspension)	Brest Arena, Brest; Attendance: 2,775; Referees: Pavićević, Ražnatović (MNE)

11 November 2017; 15:30	FC Midtjylland (Denmark)	24–27	(Hungary) Győri Audi ETO KC	Ikast-Brande Arena, Ikast; Attendance: 2,190; Referees: Marín, García (ESP)
11 November 2017; 15:30	Kristiansen 11	(12–14)	Mørk 13	Ikast-Brande Arena, Ikast; Attendance: 2,190; Referees: Marín, García (ESP)
11 November 2017; 15:30	3× (yellow card) 4× (suspension)	Report	2× (yellow card) 2× (suspension)	Ikast-Brande Arena, Ikast; Attendance: 2,190; Referees: Marín, García (ESP)

18 November 2017; 15:00	Győri Audi ETO KC (Hungary)	26–17	(France) Brest Bretagne Handball	Audi Aréna, Győr; Attendance: 5,500; Referees: Schulze, Tönnies (GER)
18 November 2017; 15:00	Broch 7	(13–7)	Sand 4	Audi Aréna, Győr; Attendance: 5,500; Referees: Schulze, Tönnies (GER)
18 November 2017; 15:00	2× (yellow card) 1× (suspension)	Report	2× (yellow card) 2× (suspension)	Audi Aréna, Győr; Attendance: 5,500; Referees: Schulze, Tönnies (GER)

18 November 2017; 15:00	Rostov-Don (Russia)	27–20	(Denmark) FC Midtjylland	Rostov-on-Don Palace of Sports, Rostov-on-Don; Attendance: 2,100; Referees: Năstase, Stancu (ROU)
18 November 2017; 15:00	Petrova 6	(15–7)	Kristiansen 9	Rostov-on-Don Palace of Sports, Rostov-on-Don; Attendance: 2,100; Referees: Năstase, Stancu (ROU)
18 November 2017; 15:00	4× (yellow card) 2× (suspension)	Report	3× (yellow card) 3× (suspension)	Rostov-on-Don Palace of Sports, Rostov-on-Don; Attendance: 2,100; Referees: Năstase, Stancu (ROU)

=== Group C ===
Pos	Team	Pld	W	D	L	GF	GA	GD	Pts	Qualification
1	(North Macedonia) HC Vardar	6	6	0	0	182	147	+35	12	Main round
2	(Hungary) FTC-Rail Cargo Hungaria	6	4	0	2	183	167	+16	8	Main round
3	(Germany) Thüringer HC	6	1	0	5	145	167	−22	2 (Note: Thüringer HC 53–52 Larvik HK)	Main round
4	(Norway) Larvik HK	6	1	0	5	152	181	−29	2	EHF Cup

Source: EHF
Rules for classification: See Tiebreakers
Notes:

6 October 2017; 19:00	HC Vardar (North Macedonia)	34–31	(Hungary) FTC-Rail Cargo Hungaria	Jane Sandanski Arena, Skopje; Attendance: 5,500; Referees: Brehmer, Skowronek (POL)
6 October 2017; 19:00	Cvijić, Penezić 7	(20–11)	Faluvégi 7	Jane Sandanski Arena, Skopje; Attendance: 5,500; Referees: Brehmer, Skowronek (POL)
6 October 2017; 19:00	3× (yellow card) 5× (suspension)	Report	3× (yellow card) 3× (suspension)	Jane Sandanski Arena, Skopje; Attendance: 5,500; Referees: Brehmer, Skowronek (POL)

7 October 2017; 17:00	Larvik HK (Norway)	27–31	(Germany) Thüringer HC	Boligmappa Arena Larvik, Larvik; Attendance: 774; Referees: Bonaventura, Bonaventura (FRA)
7 October 2017; 17:00	Christensen 7	(11–16)	Luzumová 13	Boligmappa Arena Larvik, Larvik; Attendance: 774; Referees: Bonaventura, Bonaventura (FRA)
7 October 2017; 17:00	2× (yellow card) 5× (suspension)	Report	2× (yellow card) 4× (suspension)	Boligmappa Arena Larvik, Larvik; Attendance: 774; Referees: Bonaventura, Bonaventura (FRA)

14 October 2017; 18:00	FTC-Rail Cargo Hungaria (Hungary)	37–33	(Norway) Larvik HK	OBO Aréna, Dabas; Attendance: 1,800; Referees: Antić, Jakovljević (SRB)
14 October 2017; 18:00	Van der Heijden 10	(18–15)	Breistøl 9	OBO Aréna, Dabas; Attendance: 1,800; Referees: Antić, Jakovljević (SRB)
14 October 2017; 18:00	3× (yellow card) 4× (suspension)	Report	2× (yellow card) 5× (suspension)	OBO Aréna, Dabas; Attendance: 1,800; Referees: Antić, Jakovljević (SRB)

15 October 2017; 14:00	Thüringer HC (Germany)	21–29	(North Macedonia) HC Vardar	Wiedigsburghalle, Nordhausen; Attendance: 1,500; Referees: Kiyashko, Kiselev (RUS)
15 October 2017; 14:00	Luzumová 8	(11–19)	Radičević 8	Wiedigsburghalle, Nordhausen; Attendance: 1,500; Referees: Kiyashko, Kiselev (RUS)
15 October 2017; 14:00	2× (yellow card) 4× (suspension)	Report	3× (yellow card) 5× (suspension)	Wiedigsburghalle, Nordhausen; Attendance: 1,500; Referees: Kiyashko, Kiselev (RUS)

21 October 2017; 17:00	Larvik HK (Norway)	19–31	(North Macedonia) HC Vardar	Boligmappa Arena Larvik, Larvik; Attendance: 889; Referees: Mandák, Rudinský (SVK)
21 October 2017; 17:00	Christensen 4	(9–16)	Penezić, Ristovska 6	Boligmappa Arena Larvik, Larvik; Attendance: 889; Referees: Mandák, Rudinský (SVK)
21 October 2017; 17:00	3× (yellow card) 1× (suspension)	Report	3× (yellow card) 2× (suspension)	Boligmappa Arena Larvik, Larvik; Attendance: 889; Referees: Mandák, Rudinský (SVK)

22 October 2017; 14:00	Thüringer HC (Germany)	25–29	(Hungary) FTC-Rail Cargo Hungaria	Wiedigsburghalle, Nordhausen; Attendance: 1,600; Referees: Christiansen, Hansen (DEN)
22 October 2017; 14:00	Luzumová 10	(15–14)	Pena 9	Wiedigsburghalle, Nordhausen; Attendance: 1,600; Referees: Christiansen, Hansen (DEN)
22 October 2017; 14:00	3× (yellow card) 2× (suspension)	Report	2× (yellow card) 7× (suspension)	Wiedigsburghalle, Nordhausen; Attendance: 1,600; Referees: Christiansen, Hansen (DEN)

4 November 2017; 15:00	FTC-Rail Cargo Hungaria (Hungary)	28–25	(Germany) Thüringer HC	OBO Aréna, Dabas; Attendance: 1,500; Referees: Florescu, Stoia (ROU)
4 November 2017; 15:00	Pena 6	(13–14)	Luzumová 6	OBO Aréna, Dabas; Attendance: 1,500; Referees: Florescu, Stoia (ROU)
4 November 2017; 15:00	4× (yellow card) 2× (suspension)	Report	4× (yellow card) 3× (suspension)	OBO Aréna, Dabas; Attendance: 1,500; Referees: Florescu, Stoia (ROU)

4 November 2017; 17:00	HC Vardar (North Macedonia)	30–27	(Norway) Larvik HK	Jane Sandanski Arena, Skopje; Attendance: 1,800; Referees: Năstase, Stancu (ROU)
4 November 2017; 17:00	Penezić 7	(10–11)	Breistøl, Hjertner 6	Jane Sandanski Arena, Skopje; Attendance: 1,800; Referees: Năstase, Stancu (ROU)
4 November 2017; 17:00	2× (yellow card) 2× (suspension)	Report	3× (yellow card) 3× (suspension)	Jane Sandanski Arena, Skopje; Attendance: 1,800; Referees: Năstase, Stancu (ROU)

11 November 2017; 13:30	FTC-Rail Cargo Hungaria (Hungary)	28–29	(North Macedonia) HC Vardar	OBO Aréna, Dabas; Attendance: 2,498; Referees: Bonaventura, Bonaventura (FRA)
11 November 2017; 13:30	Pena 8	(12–16)	Penezić 9	OBO Aréna, Dabas; Attendance: 2,498; Referees: Bonaventura, Bonaventura (FRA)
11 November 2017; 13:30	3× (yellow card) 3× (suspension)	Report	1× (yellow card) 6× (suspension)	OBO Aréna, Dabas; Attendance: 2,498; Referees: Bonaventura, Bonaventura (FRA)

12 November 2017; 14:00	Thüringer HC (Germany)	22–25	(Norway) Larvik HK	Wiedigsburghalle, Nordhausen; Attendance: 1,600; Referees: Vujačić, Kažanegra (MNE)
12 November 2017; 14:00	Luzumová 7	(10–14)	Christensen 6	Wiedigsburghalle, Nordhausen; Attendance: 1,600; Referees: Vujačić, Kažanegra (MNE)
12 November 2017; 14:00	2× (yellow card) 4× (suspension)	Report	2× (yellow card) 3× (suspension)	Wiedigsburghalle, Nordhausen; Attendance: 1,600; Referees: Vujačić, Kažanegra (MNE)

17 November 2017; 19:00	HC Vardar (North Macedonia)	29–21	(Germany) Thüringer HC	Jane Sandanski Arena, Skopje; Attendance: 5,000; Referees: Panayides, Andreou (CYP)
17 November 2017; 19:00	Lacrabère 7	(12–12)	Luzumová 6	Jane Sandanski Arena, Skopje; Attendance: 5,000; Referees: Panayides, Andreou (CYP)
17 November 2017; 19:00	3× (yellow card) 2× (suspension)	Report	3× (yellow card) 2× (suspension)	Jane Sandanski Arena, Skopje; Attendance: 5,000; Referees: Panayides, Andreou (CYP)

19 November 2017; 15:00	Larvik HK (Norway)	21–30	(Hungary) FTC-Rail Cargo Hungaria	Boligmappa Arena Larvik, Larvik; Attendance: 1,358; Referees: Alpaidze, Berezkina (RUS)
19 November 2017; 15:00	Tollbring 6	(9–18)	Lukács 7	Boligmappa Arena Larvik, Larvik; Attendance: 1,358; Referees: Alpaidze, Berezkina (RUS)
19 November 2017; 15:00	2× (yellow card) 2× (suspension)	Report	3× (yellow card) 4× (suspension)	Boligmappa Arena Larvik, Larvik; Attendance: 1,358; Referees: Alpaidze, Berezkina (RUS)

=== Group D ===
Pos	Team	Pld	W	D	L	GF	GA	GD	Pts	Qualification
1	(France) Metz Handball	6	5	0	1	157	137	+20	10	Main round
2	(Montenegro) ŽRK Budućnost	6	3	0	3	144	148	−4	6 (Note: ŽRK Budućnost 53–51 SG BBM Bietigheim)	Main round
3	(Germany) SG BBM Bietigheim	6	3	0	3	152	158	−6	6	Main round
4	(Norway) Vipers Kristiansand	6	1	0	5	144	154	−10	2	EHF Cup

Source: EHF
Rules for classification: See Tiebreakers
Notes:

7 October 2017; 19:00	ŽRK Budućnost (Montenegro)	32–24	(Germany) SG BBM Bietigheim	Morača Sports Center, Podgorica; Attendance: 1,500; Referees: Mandák, Rudinský (SVK)
7 October 2017; 19:00	Jauković 9	(17–10)	Kudłacz-Gloc 5	Morača Sports Center, Podgorica; Attendance: 1,500; Referees: Mandák, Rudinský (SVK)
7 October 2017; 19:00	2× (yellow card) 4× (suspension)	Report	4× (yellow card) 5× (suspension)	Morača Sports Center, Podgorica; Attendance: 1,500; Referees: Mandák, Rudinský (SVK)

8 October 2017; 19:00	Metz Handball (France)	30–22	(Norway) Vipers Kristiansand	Arènes de Metz, Metz; Attendance: 3,370; Referees: Christiansen, Hansen (DEN)
8 October 2017; 19:00	Gros 7	(14–12)	Aune 6	Arènes de Metz, Metz; Attendance: 3,370; Referees: Christiansen, Hansen (DEN)
8 October 2017; 19:00	3× (yellow card) 3× (suspension)	Report	3× (yellow card) 4× (suspension)	Arènes de Metz, Metz; Attendance: 3,370; Referees: Christiansen, Hansen (DEN)

14 October 2017; 16:00	Vipers Kristiansand (Norway)	29–19	(Montenegro) ŽRK Budućnost	Aquarama Kristiansand, Kristiansand; Attendance: 1,650; Referees: Florescu, Stoia (ROU)
14 October 2017; 16:00	Jørum Sulland 9	(15–11)	three players 4	Aquarama Kristiansand, Kristiansand; Attendance: 1,650; Referees: Florescu, Stoia (ROU)
14 October 2017; 16:00	3× (yellow card) 4× (suspension)	Report	2× (yellow card) 2× (suspension)	Aquarama Kristiansand, Kristiansand; Attendance: 1,650; Referees: Florescu, Stoia (ROU)

14 October 2017; 19:00	SG BBM Bietigheim (Germany)	26–30	(France) Metz Handball	Arena Ludwigsburg, Ludwigsburg; Attendance: 1,238; Referees: Leandersson, Lindroos (FIN)
14 October 2017; 19:00	Naidzinavicius 10	(12–17)	Smits 7	Arena Ludwigsburg, Ludwigsburg; Attendance: 1,238; Referees: Leandersson, Lindroos (FIN)
14 October 2017; 19:00	2× (yellow card) 5× (suspension)	Report	3× (yellow card) 4× (suspension)	Arena Ludwigsburg, Ludwigsburg; Attendance: 1,238; Referees: Leandersson, Lindroos (FIN)

21 October 2017; 17:30	Metz Handball (France)	27–23	(Montenegro) ŽRK Budućnost	Arènes de Metz, Metz; Attendance: 4,266; Referees: Horváth, Marton (HUN)
21 October 2017; 17:30	Gros 10	(13–10)	Laslo 7	Arènes de Metz, Metz; Attendance: 4,266; Referees: Horváth, Marton (HUN)
21 October 2017; 17:30	3× (yellow card) 2× (suspension)	Report	3× (yellow card) 4× (suspension)	Arènes de Metz, Metz; Attendance: 4,266; Referees: Horváth, Marton (HUN)

22 October 2017; 17:00	Vipers Kristiansand (Norway)	24–29	(Germany) SG BBM Bietigheim	Aquarama Kristiansand, Kristiansand; Attendance: 1,639; Referees: Brkic, Jusufhodzic (AUT)
22 October 2017; 17:00	Kristiansen 5	(8–16)	Naidzinavicius 9	Aquarama Kristiansand, Kristiansand; Attendance: 1,639; Referees: Brkic, Jusufhodzic (AUT)
22 October 2017; 17:00	2× (yellow card) 5× (suspension) 1× (red card)	Report	2× (yellow card) 7× (suspension)	Aquarama Kristiansand, Kristiansand; Attendance: 1,639; Referees: Brkic, Jusufhodzic (AUT)

1 November 2017; 18:30	SG BBM Bietigheim (Germany)	25–24	(Norway) Vipers Kristiansand	Arena Ludwigsburg, Ludwigsburg; Attendance: 1,876; Referees: Vranes, Wenninger (AUT)
1 November 2017; 18:30	Naidzinavicius 10	(16–13)	three players 6	Arena Ludwigsburg, Ludwigsburg; Attendance: 1,876; Referees: Vranes, Wenninger (AUT)
1 November 2017; 18:30	2× (yellow card) 1× (suspension)	Report	4× (yellow card) 5× (suspension)	Arena Ludwigsburg, Ludwigsburg; Attendance: 1,876; Referees: Vranes, Wenninger (AUT)

4 November 2017; 19:30	ŽRK Budućnost (Montenegro)	23–18	(France) Metz Handball	Morača Sports Center, Podgorica; Attendance: 2,300; Referees: Opava, Válek (CZE)
4 November 2017; 19:30	Jauković 8	(11–8)	Zaadi 5	Morača Sports Center, Podgorica; Attendance: 2,300; Referees: Opava, Válek (CZE)
4 November 2017; 19:30	3× (yellow card) 4× (suspension)	Report	2× (yellow card) 5× (suspension)	Morača Sports Center, Podgorica; Attendance: 2,300; Referees: Opava, Válek (CZE)

10 November 2017; 19:30	Vipers Kristiansand (Norway)	22–25	(France) Metz Handball	Aquarama Kristiansand, Kristiansand; Attendance: 1,742; Referees: Brehmer, Skowronek (POL)
10 November 2017; 19:30	Kristiansen 6	(11–12)	Gros 7	Aquarama Kristiansand, Kristiansand; Attendance: 1,742; Referees: Brehmer, Skowronek (POL)
10 November 2017; 19:30	3× (yellow card) 2× (suspension)	Report	3× (yellow card) 4× (suspension)	Aquarama Kristiansand, Kristiansand; Attendance: 1,742; Referees: Brehmer, Skowronek (POL)

12 November 2017; 19:00	SG BBM Bietigheim (Germany)	27–21	(Montenegro) ŽRK Budućnost	Arena Ludwigsburg, Ludwigsburg; Attendance: 2,258; Referees: Erdoğan, Özdeniz (TUR)
12 November 2017; 19:00	Naidzinavicius 10	(12–10)	Laslo 6	Arena Ludwigsburg, Ludwigsburg; Attendance: 2,258; Referees: Erdoğan, Özdeniz (TUR)
12 November 2017; 19:00	3× (yellow card)	Report	2× (yellow card) 5× (suspension)	Arena Ludwigsburg, Ludwigsburg; Attendance: 2,258; Referees: Erdoğan, Özdeniz (TUR)

18 November 2017; 19:00	ŽRK Budućnost (Montenegro)	26–23	(Norway) Vipers Kristiansand	Morača Sports Center, Podgorica; Attendance: 2,900; Referees: Tzaferopoulos, Bethmann (GRE)
18 November 2017; 19:00	Raičević 7	(11–13)	Sulland 10	Morača Sports Center, Podgorica; Attendance: 2,900; Referees: Tzaferopoulos, Bethmann (GRE)
18 November 2017; 19:00	3× (yellow card) 1× (suspension)	Report	4× (yellow card) 2× (suspension)	Morača Sports Center, Podgorica; Attendance: 2,900; Referees: Tzaferopoulos, Bethmann (GRE)

19 November 2017; 15:00	Metz Handball (France)	27–21	(Germany) SG BBM Bietigheim	Arènes de Metz, Metz; Attendance: 4,500; Referees: Florescu, Stoia (ROU)
19 November 2017; 15:00	Zaadi 6	(12–10)	Rozemalen 5	Arènes de Metz, Metz; Attendance: 4,500; Referees: Florescu, Stoia (ROU)
19 November 2017; 15:00	3× (yellow card) 2× (suspension)	Report	1× (yellow card) 3× (suspension)	Arènes de Metz, Metz; Attendance: 4,500; Referees: Florescu, Stoia (ROU)
