= 2017–18 Women's EHF Champions League knockout stage =

This article describes the knockout stage of the 2017–18 Women's EHF Champions League.

== Qualified teams ==
The top four placed teams from each of the two main round groups advanced to the knockout stage.

Group	First place	Second place	Third place	Fourth place
1	(Hungary) Győri Audi ETO KC	(Russia) Rostov-Don	(Romania) CSM București	(Denmark) FC Midtjylland
2	(North Macedonia) HC Vardar	(France) Metz Handball	(Hungary) FTC-Rail Cargo Hungaria	(Montenegro) ŽRK Budućnost

== Format ==
The first-placed team of each group faces the fourth-placed team, and the second-placed team will play against the third-placed team from the other group. After that a draw will be held to determine the pairings for the final four.

== Quarterfinals ==
=== Overview ===
Team 1	Agg.	Team 2	1st leg	2nd leg
ŽRK Budućnost (Montenegro)	48–56	(Hungary) Győri Audi ETO KC	20–26	28–30
FTC-Rail Cargo Hungaria (Hungary)	51–63	(Russia) Rostov-Don	29–31	22–32
CSM București (Romania)	54–48	(France) Metz Handball	34–21	20–27
FC Midtjylland (Denmark)	48–56	(North Macedonia) HC Vardar	23–24	25–32

=== Matches ===
7 April 2018; 19:00	ŽRK Buducnost (Montenegro)	20–26	(Hungary) Győri Audi ETO KC	Morača Sports Center, Podgorica; Attendance: 2,500; Referees: Leszczynski, Piechota (POL)
7 April 2018; 19:00	Raičević 9	(9–12)	Amorim, Görbicz 8	Morača Sports Center, Podgorica; Attendance: 2,500; Referees: Leszczynski, Piechota (POL)
7 April 2018; 19:00	3× (yellow card) 3× (suspension)	Report	4× (yellow card) 2× (suspension)	Morača Sports Center, Podgorica; Attendance: 2,500; Referees: Leszczynski, Piechota (POL)

14 April 2018; 19:00	Győri Audi ETO KC (Hungary)	30–28	(Montenegro) ŽRK Buducnost	Audi Aréna, Győr; Attendance: 5,237; Referees: Christiansen, Hansen (DEN)
14 April 2018; 19:00	Görbicz 11	(15–15)	Raičević 9	Audi Aréna, Győr; Attendance: 5,237; Referees: Christiansen, Hansen (DEN)
14 April 2018; 19:00	3× (yellow card) 4× (suspension)	Report	2× (yellow card) 4× (suspension)	Audi Aréna, Győr; Attendance: 5,237; Referees: Christiansen, Hansen (DEN)

Győri ETO won 56–48 on aggregate.

7 April 2018; 17:00	FTC-Rail Cargo Hungaria (Hungary)	29–31	(Russia) Rostov-Don	OBO Aréna, Dabas; Attendance: 2,489; Referees: Baumgart, Wild (GER)
7 April 2018; 17:00	three players 4	(15–16)	Vyakhireva 8	OBO Aréna, Dabas; Attendance: 2,489; Referees: Baumgart, Wild (GER)
7 April 2018; 17:00	4× (yellow card) 4× (suspension)	Report	4× (yellow card) 5× (suspension) 1× (red card)	OBO Aréna, Dabas; Attendance: 2,489; Referees: Baumgart, Wild (GER)

14 April 2018; 15:00	Rostov-Don (Russia)	32–22	(Hungary) FTC-Rail Cargo Hungaria	Rostov-on-Don Palace of Sports, Rostov-on-Don; Attendance: 3,500; Referees: Pandzić, Mosorinski (SRB)
14 April 2018; 15:00	Vyakhireva 7	(20–12)	Jovanović 5	Rostov-on-Don Palace of Sports, Rostov-on-Don; Attendance: 3,500; Referees: Pandzić, Mosorinski (SRB)
14 April 2018; 15:00	3× (yellow card) 6× (suspension) 1× (red card)	Report	3× (yellow card) 2× (suspension)	Rostov-on-Don Palace of Sports, Rostov-on-Don; Attendance: 3,500; Referees: Pandzić, Mosorinski (SRB)

Rostov-Don won 63–51 on aggregate.

6 April 2018; 19:30	CSM București (Romania)	34–21	(France) Metz Handball	Sala Polivalentă, București; Attendance: 4,874; Referees: Marić, Mašić (SRB)
6 April 2018; 19:30	Neagu 10	(19–13)	Gros 9	Sala Polivalentă, București; Attendance: 4,874; Referees: Marić, Mašić (SRB)
6 April 2018; 19:30	3× (yellow card) 2× (suspension)	Report	4× (yellow card) 2× (suspension)	Sala Polivalentă, București; Attendance: 4,874; Referees: Marić, Mašić (SRB)

15 April 2018; 17:00	Metz Handball (France)	27–20	(Romania) CSM București	Arènes de Metz, Metz; Attendance: 4,835; Referees: Kurtagic, Wetterwik (SWE)
15 April 2018; 17:00	Houette 7	(14–9)	Neagu 8	Arènes de Metz, Metz; Attendance: 4,835; Referees: Kurtagic, Wetterwik (SWE)
15 April 2018; 17:00	3× (yellow card) 1× (suspension)	Report	3× (yellow card) 3× (suspension)	Arènes de Metz, Metz; Attendance: 4,835; Referees: Kurtagic, Wetterwik (SWE)

CSM București won 54–48 on aggregate.

6 April 2018; 19:00	FC Midtjylland (Denmark)	23–24	(North Macedonia) HC Vardar	Ikast-Brande Arena, Ikast; Attendance: 2,509; Referees: Álvarez, López (ESP)
6 April 2018; 19:00	Friis, Kristiansen 6	(16–13)	Cvijić 8	Ikast-Brande Arena, Ikast; Attendance: 2,509; Referees: Álvarez, López (ESP)
6 April 2018; 19:00	2× (yellow card) 2× (suspension)	Report	1× (yellow card) 2× (suspension)	Ikast-Brande Arena, Ikast; Attendance: 2,509; Referees: Álvarez, López (ESP)

14 April 2018; 17:00	HC Vardar (North Macedonia)	32–25	(Denmark) FC Midtjylland	Jane Sandanski Arena, Skopje; Attendance: 4,300; Referees: Caçador, Nicolau (POR)
14 April 2018; 17:00	Lekić 7	(17–12)	Kristiansen 9	Jane Sandanski Arena, Skopje; Attendance: 4,300; Referees: Caçador, Nicolau (POR)
14 April 2018; 17:00	2× (yellow card) 2× (suspension)	Report	2× (yellow card)	Jane Sandanski Arena, Skopje; Attendance: 4,300; Referees: Caçador, Nicolau (POR)

HC Vardar won 56–48 on aggregate.

== Final four ==
The final four was held at the László Papp Budapest Sports Arena in Budapest, Hungary on 12 and 13 May 2018. The draw took place on 17 April 2018.

=== Bracket ===
Semifinals
12 May
(Romania) CSM București	20
(Hungary) Győri Audi ETO KC	26
12 May
(Russia) Rostov-Don	19
(North Macedonia) HC Vardar	25

Final
13 May
(Hungary) Győri Audi ETO KC (OT)	27
(North Macedonia) HC Vardar	26
Third place
13 May
(Romania) CSM București	31
(Russia) Rostov-Don	30

=== Semifinals ===
12 May 2018; 15:15	CSM București (Romania)	20–26	(Hungary) Győri Audi ETO KC	László Papp Budapest Sports Arena, Budapest; Attendance: 12,000; Referees: Jurinović, Mrvica (CRO)
12 May 2018; 15:15	Neagu 6	(10–12)	Groot 7	László Papp Budapest Sports Arena, Budapest; Attendance: 12,000; Referees: Jurinović, Mrvica (CRO)
12 May 2018; 15:15	2× (yellow card) 2× (suspension)	Report	4× (yellow card) 3× (suspension)	László Papp Budapest Sports Arena, Budapest; Attendance: 12,000; Referees: Jurinović, Mrvica (CRO)

12 May 2018; 18:00	Rostov-Don (Russia)	19–25	(North Macedonia) HC Vardar	László Papp Budapest Sports Arena, Budapest; Attendance: 12,000; Referees: Florescu, Stoia (ROU)
12 May 2018; 18:00	Ilyina 5	(7–10)	Lekić, Penezić 7	László Papp Budapest Sports Arena, Budapest; Attendance: 12,000; Referees: Florescu, Stoia (ROU)
12 May 2018; 18:00	4× (yellow card) 1× (suspension)	Report	3× (yellow card) 4× (suspension)	László Papp Budapest Sports Arena, Budapest; Attendance: 12,000; Referees: Florescu, Stoia (ROU)

=== Third place game ===
13 May 2018; 15:15	CSM București (Romania)	31–30	(Russia) Rostov-Don	László Papp Budapest Sports Arena, Budapest; Attendance: 12,000; Referees: Mitrović, Kažanegra (MNE)
13 May 2018; 15:15	Jørgensen 7	(19–14)	Borshchenko, Sudakova 5	László Papp Budapest Sports Arena, Budapest; Attendance: 12,000; Referees: Mitrović, Kažanegra (MNE)
13 May 2018; 15:15	3× (yellow card) 4× (suspension)	Report	2× (suspension)	László Papp Budapest Sports Arena, Budapest; Attendance: 12,000; Referees: Mitrović, Kažanegra (MNE)

=== Final ===
13 May 2018
18:00
Győri Audi ETO KC (Hungary)
27–26 (ET)
(North Macedonia) HC Vardar
László Papp Budapest Sports Arena, Budapest
Attendance: 12,000
Referees: Bonaventura, Bonaventura (FRA)
Groot 9
(9–9)
Lekić 6
3× (yellow card) 6× (suspension)
Report
2× (yellow card) 4× (suspension)

FT: 20–20 ET: 7–6
