= 2020–21 Women's EHF Champions League knockout stage =

The 2020–21 Women's EHF Champions League knockout stage began on 6 March and ended on 30 May 2021 with the final at the László Papp Budapest Sports Arena in Budapest, Hungary, to decide the winners of the 2020–21 Women's EHF Champions League. On 10 February 2021, after a decision by the EHF Executive Committee, it was announced that all 16 teams advanced from the group stage.

== Format ==
In the round of 16, the first-placed team from one group faced the eighth-placed team from the other group, the second-placed team faced the seventh-placed and so on. The eight winning teams advance to the quarterfinals. The four quarterfinal winners qualified for the final four tournament at the László Papp Budapest Sports Arena in Budapest, Hungary.

== Qualified teams ==
Group
| Group | First place | Second place | Third place | Fourth place | Fifth place | Sixth place | Seventh place | Eighth place |
|---|---|---|---|---|---|---|---|---|
| A | (Russia) Rostov-Don | (France) Metz Handball | (Romania) CSM Bucureşti | (Hungary) FTC-Rail Cargo Hungaria | (Norway) Vipers Kristiansand | (Denmark) Team Esbjerg | (Slovenia) Krim Mercator | (Germany) SG BBM Bietigheim |
| B | (Hungary) Győri Audi ETO KC | (Russia) CSKA Moscow | (France) Brest Bretagne Handball | (Denmark) Odense Håndbold | (Montenegro) ŽRK Budućnost | (Romania) SCM Râmnicu Vâlcea | (Germany) Borussia Dortmund | (Croatia) Podravka Vegeta |

== Round of 16 ==
=== Overview ===
| Team 1 | Agg. | Team 2 | 1st leg | 2nd leg |
|---|---|---|---|---|
| SCM Râmnicu Vâlcea (Romania) | 51–54 | (Romania) CSM Bucureşti | 24–33 | 27–21 |
| Team Esbjerg (Denmark) | 54–63 | (France) Brest Bretagne Handball | 27–33 | 27–30 |
| ŽRK Budućnost (Montenegro) | 50–48 | (Hungary) FTC-Rail Cargo Hungaria | 22–19 | 28–29 |
| Vipers Kristiansand (Norway) | 65–62 | (Denmark) Odense Håndbold | 35–36 | 30–26 |
| Podravka Vegeta (Croatia) | 44–71 | (Russia) Rostov-Don | 20–29 | 24–42 |
| SG BBM Bietigheim (Germany) | 48–69 | (Hungary) Győri Audi ETO KC | 20–37 | 28–32 |
| Borussia Dortmund (Germany) | 0–20 (Note: The matches, scheduled for 12 and 14 March 2021, were assessed by the EHF after Dortmund did not travel to France.) | (France) Metz Handball | 0–10 | 0–10 |
| Krim Mercator (Slovenia) | 46–47 | (Russia) CSKA Moscow | 25–20 | 21–27 |

=== Matches ===
| 6 March 2021; 16:00 | SCM Râmnicu Vâlcea (Romania) | 24–33 | (Romania) CSM Bucureşti | Traian Sports Hall, Râmnicu Vâlcea; Attendance: 0 (Note: The match was played behind closed doors due to the COVID-19 pandemic.); Referees: Mitrović, Kažanegra (MNE) |
| 6 March 2021; 16:00 | Liščević 7 | (12–13) | Neagu 13 | Traian Sports Hall, Râmnicu Vâlcea; Attendance: 0 Referees: Mitrović, Kažanegra (MNE) |
| 6 March 2021; 16:00 | 2× (yellow card) 2× (suspension) | Report | 1× (yellow card) 4× (suspension) | Traian Sports Hall, Râmnicu Vâlcea; Attendance: 0 Referees: Mitrović, Kažanegra (MNE) |

| 13 March 2021; 16:00 | CSM Bucureşti (Romania) | 21–27 | (Romania) SCM Râmnicu Vâlcea | Polyvalent Hall, Bucharest; Attendance: 0 Referees: Mitrevksi, Todorovski (MKD) |
| 13 March 2021; 16:00 | Neagu 11 | (11–15) | González 7 | Polyvalent Hall, Bucharest; Attendance: 0 Referees: Mitrevksi, Todorovski (MKD) |
| 13 March 2021; 16:00 | 2× (yellow card) 8× (suspension) 1× (red card) | Report | 2× (yellow card) 5× (suspension) | Polyvalent Hall, Bucharest; Attendance: 0 Referees: Mitrevksi, Todorovski (MKD) |

CSM Bucureşti won 54–51 on aggregate.

| 7 March 2021; 16:00 | Team Esbjerg (Denmark) | 27–33 | (France) Brest Bretagne Handball | Blue Water Dokken, Esbjerg; Attendance: 0 Referees: Simone, Monitillo (ITA) |
| 7 March 2021; 16:00 | Pena 9 | (16–17) | Gros 10 | Blue Water Dokken, Esbjerg; Attendance: 0 Referees: Simone, Monitillo (ITA) |
| 7 March 2021; 16:00 | 1× (yellow card) 4× (suspension) | Report | 1× (yellow card) 5× (suspension) | Blue Water Dokken, Esbjerg; Attendance: 0 Referees: Simone, Monitillo (ITA) |

| 14 March 2021; 14:00 | Brest Bretagne Handball (France) | 30–27 | (Denmark) Team Esbjerg | Brest Arena, Brest; Attendance: 0 Referees: Sá, Sá (POR) |
| 14 March 2021; 14:00 | Gros 7 | (19–11) | Tranborg 6 | Brest Arena, Brest; Attendance: 0 Referees: Sá, Sá (POR) |
| 14 March 2021; 14:00 | 2× (yellow card) 1× (suspension) | Report | 1× (yellow card) 2× (suspension) | Brest Arena, Brest; Attendance: 0 Referees: Sá, Sá (POR) |

Brest Bretagne won 63–54 on aggregate.

| 7 March 2021; 16:00 | ŽRK Budućnost (Montenegro) | 22–19 | (Hungary) FTC-Rail Cargo Hungaria | Morača Sports Center, Podgorica; Attendance: 0 Referees: Năstase, Stancu (ROU) |
| 7 March 2021; 16:00 | Radičević 7 | (11–7) | Bölk 5 | Morača Sports Center, Podgorica; Attendance: 0 Referees: Năstase, Stancu (ROU) |
| 7 March 2021; 16:00 | 1× (yellow card) 2× (suspension) | Report | 1× (yellow card) 5× (suspension) | Morača Sports Center, Podgorica; Attendance: 0 Referees: Năstase, Stancu (ROU) |

| 13 March 2021; 18:00 | FTC-Rail Cargo Hungaria (Hungary) | 29–28 | (Montenegro) ŽRK Budućnost | Érd Aréna, Érd; Attendance: 0 Referees: Alpaidze, Berezkina (RUS) |
| 13 March 2021; 18:00 | Bölk 5 | (9–15) | Radičević 9 | Érd Aréna, Érd; Attendance: 0 Referees: Alpaidze, Berezkina (RUS) |
| 13 March 2021; 18:00 | 1× (yellow card) 3× (suspension) | Report | 1× (yellow card) 3× (suspension) | Érd Aréna, Érd; Attendance: 0 Referees: Alpaidze, Berezkina (RUS) |

ŽRK Budućnost won 50–48 on aggregate.

| 7 March 2021; 18:00 | Vipers Kristiansand (Norway) | 35–36 | (Denmark) Odense Håndbold | Ikast-Brande Arena, Kristiansand; Attendance: 0 Referees: Smailagic, Smailagic (SWE) |
| 7 March 2021; 18:00 | Reistad 10 | (16–17) | Abbingh 9 | Ikast-Brande Arena, Kristiansand; Attendance: 0 Referees: Smailagic, Smailagic (SWE) |
| 7 March 2021; 18:00 | 2× (yellow card) 4× (suspension) | Report | 1× (yellow card) 1× (suspension) | Ikast-Brande Arena, Kristiansand; Attendance: 0 Referees: Smailagic, Smailagic (SWE) |

| 14 March 2021; 16:00 | Odense Håndbold (Denmark) | 26–30 | (Norway) Vipers Kristiansand | Sydbank Arena, Odense; Attendance: 1 Referees: Bethmann, Tzaferopoulos (GRE) |
| 14 March 2021; 16:00 | Quintino 6 | (14–19) | Sulland 8 | Sydbank Arena, Odense; Attendance: 1 Referees: Bethmann, Tzaferopoulos (GRE) |
| 14 March 2021; 16:00 | 4× (yellow card) 4× (suspension) | Report | 2× (yellow card) 4× (suspension) | Sydbank Arena, Odense; Attendance: 1 Referees: Bethmann, Tzaferopoulos (GRE) |

Vipers Kristiansand won 65–62 on aggregate.

| 6 March 2021; 18:00 | Podravka Vegeta (Croatia) | 20–29 | (Russia) Rostov-Don | Gimnazija "Fran Galović", Koprivnica; Attendance: 0 Referees: Şimşek, Hatipoğlu (TUR) |
| 6 March 2021; 18:00 | Milosavljević 6 | (10–17) | Kuznetsova, Managarova 5 | Gimnazija "Fran Galović", Koprivnica; Attendance: 0 Referees: Şimşek, Hatipoğlu (TUR) |
| 6 March 2021; 18:00 | 2× (yellow card) 3× (suspension) | Report | 2× (yellow card) 1× (suspension) | Gimnazija "Fran Galović", Koprivnica; Attendance: 0 Referees: Şimşek, Hatipoğlu (TUR) |

| 14 March 2021; 14:00 | Rostov-Don (Russia) | 42–24 | (Croatia) Podravka Vegeta | Rostov-on-Don Palace of Sports, Rostov-on-Don; Attendance: 2,625; Referees: Antić, Jakovljević (SRB) |
| 14 March 2021; 14:00 | Krpež-Šlezak 9 | (24–11) | Milosavljević 7 | Rostov-on-Don Palace of Sports, Rostov-on-Don; Attendance: 2,625; Referees: Antić, Jakovljević (SRB) |
| 14 March 2021; 14:00 | 4× (suspension) | Report | 1× (yellow card) 5× (suspension) | Rostov-on-Don Palace of Sports, Rostov-on-Don; Attendance: 2,625; Referees: Antić, Jakovljević (SRB) |

Rostov-Don won 71–44 on aggregate.

| 7 March 2021; 14:00 | SG BBM Bietigheim (Germany) | 20–37 | (Hungary) Győri Audi ETO KC | Arena Ludwigsburg, Ludwigsburg; Attendance: 0 Referees: Capoccia, Jucker (SUI) |
| 7 March 2021; 14:00 | Maidhof 6 | (8–18) | Görbicz, Kristiansen 6 | Arena Ludwigsburg, Ludwigsburg; Attendance: 0 Referees: Capoccia, Jucker (SUI) |
| 7 March 2021; 14:00 | 2× (yellow card) 3× (suspension) | Report | 1× (yellow card) 2× (suspension) | Arena Ludwigsburg, Ludwigsburg; Attendance: 0 Referees: Capoccia, Jucker (SUI) |

| 13 March 2021; 16:00 | Győri Audi ETO KC (Hungary) | 32–28 | (Germany) SG BBM Bietigheim | Audi Aréna, Győr; Attendance: 0 Referees: Praštalo, Balvan (BIH) |
| 13 March 2021; 16:00 | Nze Minko 6 | (19–16) | Naidzavinicius 7 | Audi Aréna, Győr; Attendance: 0 Referees: Praštalo, Balvan (BIH) |
| 13 March 2021; 16:00 | 1× (yellow card) 2× (suspension) | Report | 2× (yellow card) 3× (suspension) | Audi Aréna, Győr; Attendance: 0 Referees: Praštalo, Balvan (BIH) |

Győri Audi ETO KC won 69–48 on aggregate.

| Cancelled (Note: The match, originally scheduled for 7 March and rescheduled to 12 March 2021, was postponed.) | Borussia Dortmund (Germany) | 0–10 | (France) Metz Handball |

| Cancelled (Note: The match, originally scheduled for 14 March 2021, was postponed.) | Metz Handball (France) | 10–0 | (Germany) Borussia Dortmund |

| 6 March 2021; 16:00 | Krim Mercator (Slovenia) | 25–20 | (Russia) CSKA Moscow | Arena Stožice, Ljubljana; Attendance: 0 Referees: Vranes, Wenninger (AUT) |
| 6 March 2021; 16:00 | Vieira 8 | (12–11) | Gorshkova 4 | Arena Stožice, Ljubljana; Attendance: 0 Referees: Vranes, Wenninger (AUT) |
| 6 March 2021; 16:00 | 1× (yellow card) 6× (suspension) | Report | 1× (yellow card) 4× (suspension) | Arena Stožice, Ljubljana; Attendance: 0 Referees: Vranes, Wenninger (AUT) |

| 13 March 2021; 16:00 | CSKA Moscow (Russia) | 27–21 | (Slovenia) Krim Mercator | Dynamo Volleyball Arena, Moscow; Attendance: 550; Referees: Erdoğan, Özdeniz (TUR) |
| 13 March 2021; 16:00 | Dmitrieva 7 | (14–11) | Pletikosić 7 | Dynamo Volleyball Arena, Moscow; Attendance: 550; Referees: Erdoğan, Özdeniz (TUR) |
| 13 March 2021; 16:00 | 2× (yellow card) 6× (suspension) | Report | 1× (yellow card) 4× (suspension) 1× (red card) | Dynamo Volleyball Arena, Moscow; Attendance: 550; Referees: Erdoğan, Özdeniz (TUR) |

CSKA Moscow won 47–46 on aggregate.

== Quarterfinals ==
=== Overview ===
| Team 1 | Agg. | Team 2 | 1st leg | 2nd leg |
|---|---|---|---|---|
| CSM București (Romania) | 51–51 (a) | (Russia) CSKA Moscow | 32–27 | 19–24 |
| Brest Bretagne Handball (France) | 60–50 | (France) Metz Handball | 34–24 | 26–26 |
| ŽRK Budućnost (Montenegro) | 40–54 | (Hungary) Győri Audi ETO KC | 19–30 | 21–24 |
| Vipers Kristiansand (Norway) | 57–50 | (Russia) Rostov-Don | 34–27 | 23–23 |

=== Matches ===
| 3 April 2021; 16:00 | CSM București (Romania) | 32–27 | (Russia) CSKA Moscow | Sala Polivalentă, Bucharest; Attendance: 0 Referees: Álvarez, Bustamante (ESP) |
| 3 April 2021; 16:00 | Lazović, Neagu 6 | (20–12) | Skorobogatchenko 5 | Sala Polivalentă, Bucharest; Attendance: 0 Referees: Álvarez, Bustamante (ESP) |
| 3 April 2021; 16:00 | 1× (yellow card) 4× (suspension) | Report | 1× (yellow card) 2× (suspension) | Sala Polivalentă, Bucharest; Attendance: 0 Referees: Álvarez, Bustamante (ESP) |

| 11 April 2021; 16:00 | CSKA Moscow (Russia) | 24–19 | (Romania) CSM București | Dynamo Volleyball Arena, Moscow; Attendance: 1,900; Referees: Ilieva, Karbeska (MKD) |
| 11 April 2021; 16:00 | Ristovska 7 | (12–11) | Neagu 9 | Dynamo Volleyball Arena, Moscow; Attendance: 1,900; Referees: Ilieva, Karbeska (MKD) |
| 11 April 2021; 16:00 | 2× (yellow card) 1× (suspension) | Report | 3× (yellow card) 2× (suspension) | Dynamo Volleyball Arena, Moscow; Attendance: 1,900; Referees: Ilieva, Karbeska (MKD) |

51–51 on aggregate. CSKA Moscow won on away goals.

| 4 April 2021; 14:00 | Brest Bretagne Handball (France) | 34–24 | (France) Metz Handball | Brest Arena, Brest; Attendance: 0 Referees: Ciulei, Stoia (ROU) |
| 4 April 2021; 14:00 | Gros 10 | (16–11) | Burgaard, Sajka 4 | Brest Arena, Brest; Attendance: 0 Referees: Ciulei, Stoia (ROU) |
| 4 April 2021; 14:00 | 2× (yellow card) 5× (suspension) 1× (red card) | Report | 1× (yellow card) 7× (suspension) 1× (red card) | Brest Arena, Brest; Attendance: 0 Referees: Ciulei, Stoia (ROU) |

| 10 April 2021; 16:00 | Metz Handball (France) | 26–26 | (France) Brest Bretagne Handball | Metz Arena, Metz; Attendance: 0 Referees: Lončar, Lončar (CRO) |
| 10 April 2021; 16:00 | Mičijević 7 | (14–17) | Foppa 6 | Metz Arena, Metz; Attendance: 0 Referees: Lončar, Lončar (CRO) |
| 10 April 2021; 16:00 | 4× (suspension) 1× (red card) | Report | 2× (yellow card) 4× (suspension) | Metz Arena, Metz; Attendance: 0 Referees: Lončar, Lončar (CRO) |

Brest Bretagne won 60–50 on aggregate.

| 3 April 2021; 18:00 | ŽRK Budućnost (Montenegro) | 19–30 | (Hungary) Győri Audi ETO KC | Morača Sports Center, Podgorica; Attendance: 0 Referees: Christidi, Papamattheou (GRE) |
| 3 April 2021; 18:00 | Pineau, Radičević 5 | (11–16) | Oftedal 9 | Morača Sports Center, Podgorica; Attendance: 0 Referees: Christidi, Papamattheou (GRE) |
| 3 April 2021; 18:00 | 3× (yellow card) 3× (suspension) | Report | 1× (yellow card) 3× (suspension) | Morača Sports Center, Podgorica; Attendance: 0 Referees: Christidi, Papamattheou (GRE) |

| 10 April 2021; 18:00 | Győri Audi ETO KC (Hungary) | 24–21 | (Montenegro) ŽRK Budućnost | Audi Aréna, Győr; Attendance: 0 Referees: Vranes, Wenninger (AUT) |
| 10 April 2021; 18:00 | four players 4 | (10–11) | Radičević 7 | Audi Aréna, Győr; Attendance: 0 Referees: Vranes, Wenninger (AUT) |
| 10 April 2021; 18:00 | 2× (yellow card) 2× (suspension) | Report | 2× (yellow card) 5× (suspension) | Audi Aréna, Győr; Attendance: 0 Referees: Vranes, Wenninger (AUT) |

Győri Audi ETO KC won 54–40 on aggregate.

| 10 April 2021 (Note: The match, originally scheduled for 4 April, was rescheduled to 10 April 2021.); 14:00 | Vipers Kristiansand (Norway) | 34–27 | (Russia) Rostov-Don | Rostov-on-Don Palace of Sports, Rostov-on-Don; Attendance: 2,625; Referees: Mitrović, Kažanegra (MNE) |
| 10 April 2021; 14:00 | Mørk 9 | (19–12) | Zaadi 8 | Rostov-on-Don Palace of Sports, Rostov-on-Don; Attendance: 2,625; Referees: Mitrović, Kažanegra (MNE) |
| 10 April 2021; 14:00 | 2× (yellow card) 7× (suspension) | Report | 1× (suspension) | Rostov-on-Don Palace of Sports, Rostov-on-Don; Attendance: 2,625; Referees: Mitrović, Kažanegra (MNE) |

| 11 April 2021 (Note: The match, originally scheduled for 10 April, was rescheduled to 11 April 2021.); 14:00 | Rostov-Don (Russia) | 23–23 | (Norway) Vipers Kristiansand | Rostov-on-Don Palace of Sports, Rostov-on-Don; Attendance: 2,352; Referees: Mitrović, Kažanegra (MNE) |
| 11 April 2021; 14:00 | Zaadi 10 | (11–12) | Løke, Mørk 5 | Rostov-on-Don Palace of Sports, Rostov-on-Don; Attendance: 2,352; Referees: Mitrović, Kažanegra (MNE) |
| 11 April 2021; 14:00 | 1× (yellow card) 2× (suspension) | Report | 1× (yellow card) 2× (suspension) | Rostov-on-Don Palace of Sports, Rostov-on-Don; Attendance: 2,352; Referees: Mitrović, Kažanegra (MNE) |

Vipers Kristiansand won 57–50 on aggregate.

== Final four ==
The final four was held at the László Papp Budapest Sports Arena in Budapest, Hungary on 29 and 30 May 2021. The draw was made on 13 April 2021.

=== Bracket ===
Semi-finals
29 May
(Hungary) Győri Audi ETO KC | 23 (2)
(France) Brest Bretagne Handball (Pen) | 23 (4)
29 May
(Norway) Vipers Kristiansand | 33
(Russia) CSKA Moscow | 30

Final
30 May
(France) Brest Bretagne Handball | 28
(Norway) Vipers Kristiansand | 34
Third place
30 May
(Hungary) Győri Audi ETO KC | 32
(Russia) CSKA Moscow | 21

=== Semifinals ===
29 May 2021
15:15
Győri Audi ETO KC (Hungary)
25–27 (ET)
(France) Brest Bretagne Handball
László Papp Budapest Sports Arena, Budapest
Attendance: 2,500
Referees: Sá, Sá (POR)
Kristiansen 8
(8–11)
Gros 9
4× (suspension)
Report
5× (suspension)

FT: 20–20 ET: 3–3 Pen: 2–4

| 29 May 2021; 18:00 | Vipers Kristiansand (Norway) | 33–30 | (Russia) CSKA Moscow | László Papp Budapest Sports Arena, Budapest; Attendance: 2,300; Referees: Antić, Jakovljević (SRB) |
| 29 May 2021; 18:00 | Reistad 10 | (18–12) | Vedekhina 7 | László Papp Budapest Sports Arena, Budapest; Attendance: 2,300; Referees: Antić, Jakovljević (SRB) |
| 29 May 2021; 18:00 | 2× (yellow card) 5× (suspension) | Report | 6× (suspension) | László Papp Budapest Sports Arena, Budapest; Attendance: 2,300; Referees: Antić, Jakovljević (SRB) |

=== Third place game ===
| 30 May 2021; 15:15 | Győri Audi ETO KC (Hungary) | 32–21 | (Russia) CSKA Moscow | László Papp Budapest Sports Arena, Budapest; Attendance: 2,300; Referees: Christidi, Papamattheou (GRE) |
| 30 May 2021; 15:15 | Oftedal 8 | (18–8) | Mikhaylichenko 4 | László Papp Budapest Sports Arena, Budapest; Attendance: 2,300; Referees: Christidi, Papamattheou (GRE) |
| 30 May 2021; 15:15 | 2× (yellow card) 4× (suspension) | Report | 1× (yellow card) 4× (suspension) | László Papp Budapest Sports Arena, Budapest; Attendance: 2,300; Referees: Christidi, Papamattheou (GRE) |

=== Final ===
| 30 May 2021; 18:00 | Brest Bretagne Handball (France) | 28–34 | (Norway) Vipers Kristiansand | László Papp Budapest Sports Arena, Budapest; Attendance: 2,300; Referees: Năstase, Stancu (ROU) |
| 30 May 2021; 18:00 | Gros 8 | (14–18) | Reistad 12 | László Papp Budapest Sports Arena, Budapest; Attendance: 2,300; Referees: Năstase, Stancu (ROU) |
| 30 May 2021; 18:00 | 1× (yellow card) 2× (suspension) | Report | 3× (yellow card) 6× (suspension) | László Papp Budapest Sports Arena, Budapest; Attendance: 2,300; Referees: Năstase, Stancu (ROU) |
