= 2017–18 Women's EHF Champions League =

International handball tournament

Women's EHF Champions League
- 2017–18

Tournament information
- Sport: Handball
- Dates: 9 September 2017–13 May 2018
- Teams: 16 (group stage); 22 (qualification)
- Website: ehfcl.com

Final positions
- Champions: (Hungary) Győri Audi ETO KC
- Runner-up: (North Macedonia) HC Vardar

Tournament statistics
- Matches played: 96
- Goals scored: 5014 (52.23 per match)
- Attendance: 281,647 (2,934 per match)
- Top scorer(s): (Romania) Cristina Neagu (110 goals)

The 2017–18 EHF Champions League was the 25th edition of Europe's premier club handball tournament.

Győri Audi ETO KC defended their title by defeating HC Vardar in the final.

== Competition format ==
16 teams participated in the competition, divided in four groups who played in a round robin, home and away format. The top three teams in each group qualified for the main round

Main round

The 12 qualified teams were divided in four groups who played in a round robin, home and away format. The points gained against the qualified teams in the first round were carried over. The top four teams in each group qualified for the quarterfinals.

Knockout stage

After the quarterfinals, the culmination of the season, the WOMEN'S EHF FINAL4, will continue in its existing format, with the four top teams from the competition competing for the title.

== Team allocation ==
14 teams were directly qualified for the group stage.

Group stage
(Denmark) FC Midtjylland	(Denmark) Nykøbing Falster Håndbold	(France) Brest Bretagne Handball	(France) Metz Handball
(Germany) SG BBM Bietigheim	(Hungary) FTC-Rail Cargo Hungaria	(Hungary) Győri Audi ETO KC	(North Macedonia) HC Vardar
(Montenegro) ŽRK Budućnost	(Norway) Larvik HK	(Poland) Vistal Gdynia	(Romania) CSM București
(Russia) Rostov-Don	(Slovenia) RK Krim		
Qualification tournaments
(Austria) Hypo Niederösterreich	(Belarus) HC Gomel	(Croatia) Podravka Koprivnica	(Germany) Thüringer HC
(Norway) Vipers Kristiansand	(Spain) CB Atlético Guardés	(Sweden) H 65 Höör	(Turkey) Kastamonu Belediyesi

== Round and draw dates ==
The qualification draw was held in Vienna, Austria, the group stage draw in Ljubljana, Slovenia and the final four draw in Budapest, Hungary.

Phase	Draw date
Qualification tournaments	29 June 2017
Group stage	30 June 2017
Knockout stage	30 June 2017
Final Four	17 April 2018

== Qualification stage ==
The draw was held on 29 June 2017. The two winners of the qualification tournaments advanced to the group stage.

=== Qualification tournament 1 ===
Vipers Kristiansand hosted the tournament.

=== Bracket ===
Semifinals
9 September
(Norway) Vipers Kristiansand	43
(Belarus) HC Gomel	19
9 September
(Croatia) Podravka Koprivnica	21
(Turkey) Kastamonu Belediyesi	17

Final
10 September
(Norway) Vipers Kristiansand	42
(Croatia) Podravka Koprivnica	14
Third place
10 September
(Belarus) HC Gomel	29
(Turkey) Kastamonu Belediyesi	28

=== Qualification tournament 2 ===
Thüringer HC hosted the tournament.

=== Bracket ===
Semifinals
9 September
(Germany) Thüringer HC	31
(Spain) CB Atlético Guardés	21
9 September
(Sweden) H 65 Höör	32
(Austria) Hypo Niederösterreich	19

Final
10 September
(Germany) Thüringer HC	33
(Sweden) H 65 Höör	24
Third place
10 September
(Spain) CB Atlético Guardés	27
(Austria) Hypo Niederösterreich	29

== Group stage ==
The draw was held on 30 June 2017.

In each group, teams played against each other in a double round-robin format, with home and away matches.

Tiebreakers
In the group stage, teams are ranked according to points (2 points for a win, 1 point for a draw, 0 points for a loss). After completion of the group stage, if two or more teams have scored the same number of points, the ranking will be determined as follows:
1. Highest number of points in matches between the teams directly involved;
2. Superior goal difference in matches between the teams directly involved;
3. Highest number of goals scored in matches between the teams directly involved (or in the away match in case of a two-team tie);
4. Superior goal difference in all matches of the group;
5. Highest number of plus goals in all matches of the group;

If the ranking of one of these teams is determined, the above criteria are consecutively followed until the ranking of all teams is determined. If no ranking can be determined, a decision shall be obtained by EHF through drawing of lots.

During the group stage, only criteria 4–5 apply to determine the provisional ranking of teams.

=== Group A ===
Pos	Team	Pld	W	D	L	GF	GA	GD	Pts	Qualification	BUC	NYK	KRI	GDY
1	(Romania) CSM Bucureşti	6	5	0	1	192	144	+48	10	Main round	—	39–26	30–18	34–22
2	(Denmark) Nykøbing Falster	6	4	0	2	168	163	+5	8	Main round	25–22	—	28–26	27–21
3	(Slovenia) RK Krim	6	3	0	3	159	158	+1	6	Main round	30–33	27–26	—	29–22
4	(Poland) Vistal Gdynia	6	0	0	6	135	189	−54	0	EHF Cup	23–34	28–36	19–29	—

Source: EHF
Rules for classification: See Tiebreakers

=== Group B ===
Pos	Team	Pld	W	D	L	GF	GA	GD	Pts	Qualification	GYO	ROS	MID	BRE
1	(Hungary) Győri Audi ETO KC	6	5	0	1	153	126	+27	10	Main round	—	25–23	27–16	29–17
2	(Russia) Rostov-Don	6	4	0	2	149	138	+11	8	Main round	23–22	—	27–20	26–24
3	(Denmark) FC Midtjylland	6	3	0	3	134	147	−13	6	Main round	24–27	24–21	—	27–23
4	(France) Brest Bretagne Handball	6	0	0	6	132	157	−25	0	EHF Cup	23–26	23–29	22–23	—

Source: EHF
Rules for classification: See Tiebreakers

=== Group C ===
Pos	Team	Pld	W	D	L	GF	GA	GD	Pts	Qualification	VAR	FER	THÜ	LAR
1	(North Macedonia) HC Vardar	6	6	0	0	182	147	+35	12	Main round	—	34–31	29–21	30–27
2	(Hungary) FTC-Rail Cargo Hungaria	6	4	0	2	183	167	+16	8	Main round	28–29	—	28–25	37–33
3	(Germany) Thüringer HC	6	1	0	5	145	167	−22	2 (Note: Thüringer HC 53–52 Larvik HK)	Main round	21–29	25–29	—	22–25
4	(Norway) Larvik HK	6	1	0	5	152	181	−29	2	EHF Cup	19–31	21–30	27–31	—

Source: EHF
Rules for classification: See Tiebreakers

=== Group D ===
Pos	Team	Pld	W	D	L	GF	GA	GD	Pts	Qualification	MET	BUD	BIE	KRI
1	(France) Metz Handball	6	5	0	1	157	137	+20	10	Main round	—	27–23	27–21	30–22
2	(Montenegro) ŽRK Budućnost	6	3	0	3	144	148	−4	6 (Note: ŽRK Budućnost 53–51 SG BBM Bietigheim)	Main round	23–18	—	32–24	26–23
3	(Germany) SG BBM Bietigheim	6	3	0	3	152	158	−6	6	Main round	26–30	27–21	—	25–24
4	(Norway) Vipers Kristiansand	6	1	0	5	144	154	−10	2	EHF Cup	22–25	29–19	24–29	—

Source: EHF
Rules for classification: See Tiebreakers

== Main round ==
The top three teams of each preliminary group advance. Points obtained against qualified teams from the same group are carried over.

In each group, teams play against each other in a double round-robin format, with home and away matches.

=== Group 1 ===
Pos	Team	Pld	W	D	L	GF	GA	GD	Pts	Qualification	GYO	ROS	BUC	MID	NYK	KRI
1	(Hungary) Győri Audi ETO KC	10	8	0	2	281	231	+50	16	Quarterfinals	—	25–23	28–24	27–16	32–23	34–25
2	(Russia) Rostov-Don	10	7	1	2	266	232	+34	15	Quarterfinals	23–22	—	25–24	27–20	32–22	29–22
3	(Romania) CSM Bucureşti	10	6	1	3	282	246	+36	13	Quarterfinals	28–22	22–22	—	29–24	39–26	30–18
4	(Denmark) FC Midtjylland	10	2	2	6	226	251	−25	6	Quarterfinals	24–27	24–21	26–31	—	24–20	24–24
5	(Denmark) Nykøbing Falster	10	2	1	7	240	284	−44	5 (Note: Nykøbing Falster 54–53 RK Krim)		24–32	25–29	25–22	21–21	—	28–26
6	(Slovenia) RK Krim	10	2	1	7	243	294	−51	5		21–32	26–35	30–33	24–23	27–26	—

Source: EHF
Rules for classification: See Tiebreakers

=== Group 2 ===
Pos	Team	Pld	W	D	L	GF	GA	GD	Pts	Qualification	VAR	MET	FER	BUD	BIE	THÜ
1	(North Macedonia) HC Vardar	10	9	0	1	301	245	+56	18	Quarterfinals	—	29–23	34–31	31–24	30–22	29–21
2	(France) Metz Handball	10	7	0	3	269	256	+13	14	Quarterfinals	24–22	—	28–25	27–23	27–21	35–29
3	(Hungary) FTC-Rail Cargo Hungaria	10	6	0	4	282	265	+17	12	Quarterfinals	28–39	29–27	—	34–26	31–22	28–25
4	(Montenegro) ŽRK Budućnost	10	4	0	6	251	260	−9	8	Quarterfinals	25–30	23–18	23–24	—	32–24	29–21
5	(Germany) SG BBM Bietigheim	10	2	0	8	242	294	−52	4 (Note: SG BBM Bietigheim 57–52 Thüringer HC)		26–38	26–30	27–23	27–21	—	31–24
6	(Germany) Thüringer HC	10	2	0	8	257	282	−25	4		21–29	29–31	25–29	24–25	28–26	—

Source: EHF
Rules for classification: See Tiebreakers

== Knockout stage ==
The first four placed teams from the main round qualified for the knockout stage.

=== Quarterfinals ===
Team 1	Agg.	Team 2	1st leg	2nd leg
ŽRK Budućnost (Montenegro)	48–56	(Hungary) Győri Audi ETO KC	20–26	28–30
FTC-Rail Cargo Hungaria (Hungary)	51–63	(Russia) Rostov-Don	29–31	22–32
CSM București (Romania)	54–48	(France) Metz Handball	34–21	20–27
FC Midtjylland (Denmark)	48–56	(North Macedonia) HC Vardar	23–24	25–32

=== Bracket ===
Semifinals
12 May
(Romania) CSM București	20
(Hungary) Győri Audi ETO KC	26
12 May
(Russia) Rostov-Don	19
(North Macedonia) HC Vardar	25

Final
13 May
(Hungary) Győri Audi ETO KC (OT)	27
(North Macedonia) HC Vardar	26
Third place
13 May
(Romania) CSM București	31
(Russia) Rostov-Don	30

==== Final ====
13 May 2018
18:00
Győri Audi ETO KC (Hungary)
27–26 (ET)
(North Macedonia) HC Vardar
László Papp Budapest Sports Arena, Budapest
Attendance: 12,000
Referees: Bonaventura, Bonaventura (FRA)
Groot 9
(9–9)
Lekić 6
3× (yellow card) 6× (suspension)
Report
2× (yellow card) 4× (suspension)

FT: 20–20 ET: 7–6

== Awards and statistics ==
=== All-Star Team ===
The all-star team and awards were announced on 11 May 2018.

- Goalkeeper: Kari Aalvik Grimsbø (NOR)
- Right wing: Yulia Managarova (RUS)
- Right back: Ana Gros (SVN)
- Centre back: Veronica Kristiansen (NOR)
- Left back: Cristina Neagu (ROU)
- Left wing: Siraba Dembélé (FRA)
- Pivot: Dragana Cvijić (SRB)

=== Other awards ===
- MVP of the Final Four: Amandine Leynaud (FRA)
- Best coach: Ambros Martín (ESP)
- Best young player: Tjaša Stanko (SVN)
- Best defence player: Zsuzsanna Tomori (HUN)

== Top goalscorers ==
As of 13 May 2018

Rank	Player	Club	Goals
1	(Romania) Cristina Neagu	(Romania) CSM București	110
2	(Czech Republic) Iveta Luzumová	(Germany) Thüringer HC	105
3	(Croatia) Andrea Penezić	(North Macedonia) HC Vardar	92
4	(Norway) Veronica Kristiansen	(Denmark) FC Midtjylland	91
5	(Sweden) Johanna Westberg	(Denmark) Nykøbing Falster	76
6	(Slovenia) Ana Gros	(France) Metz Handball	74
7	(Montenegro) Milena Raičević	(Montenegro) ŽRK Budućnost	72
8	(Hungary) Anita Görbicz	(Hungary) Győri Audi ETO KC	70
9	(Serbia) Andrea Lekić	(North Macedonia) HC Vardar	69
10	(Spain) Nerea Pena	(Hungary) FTC-Rail Cargo Hungaria	66
10	(Russia) Anna Vyakhireva	(Russia) Rostov-Don	66
10	(Sweden) Isabelle Gulldén	(Romania) CSM București	66
