= Rostov-Don =

Professional women's handball team in Russia

- Full name: Rostov-Don Handball Club
- Short name: Rostov
- Founded: 1965; 61 years ago
- Arena: Indoor Football Arena (Rostov Olympic Reserve School)
- Head coach: Irina Dibirova
- Captain: Yulia Managarova
- League: Russian Super League
- 2025–26: Regular season: 1st of 12; Playoffs: Champions
- Club colours
Home	Away

Rostov-Don (Russian: Ростов-Дон) is a professional female handball team from Rostov-on-Don, Russia. Established in 1965, the club was called Rostselmash until 2002. Rostov-Don competes in the Russian Super League and has won it eight times, most recently in 2026.

Internationally, the club have won the Women's EHF Cup in 2016–17, and was runner-up of the 2014–15 edition after losing the finals against the Danish team TTH Holstebro. In the 2017–18 EHF Champions League, the club reached the Final 4 tournament for the first time in the club's history, where they finished fourth. The following year, they reached the Final 4 once again. This time they made it to the final, losing to Győri Audi ETO.

== Team ==
=== Current squad ===
Squad for the 2026–27 season

Goalkeepers

- 1 (Russia) Anastasia Ryabtseva
- 21 (Russia) Anastasia Yasnitskaya
- 27 (Russia) Anastasia Kazmenko

Right wingers

- 9 (Russia) Oksana Bessalaya
- 15 (Russia) Ekaterina Levsha
- 71 (Russia) Anna Kaynarova

Left wingers

- 24 (Russia) Alena Balandina
- 55 (Russia) Viktoria Kovshikova
- 63 (Russia) Kristina Kozhokar

Line players

- 3 (Russia) Varvara Yuryeva
- 8 (Russia) Anna Sen
- 75 (Russia) Alena Amelchenko
- 77 (Russia) Olesya Chernenko

Left backs

- 42 (Belarus) Alina Kishko
- 44 (Russia) Anastasiya Shavman
- 66 (Russia) Julia Babenko
- 81 (Russia) Darya Statsenko

Central backs

- 25 (Russia) Yaroslava Frolova
- 51 (Russia) Milana Tazhenova

Right backs

- 13 (Russia) Anna Shaposhnikova
- 76 (Russia) Ekaterina Zelenkova

=== Staff members ===
Staff for the 2023–24 season

- (Russia) Head coach: Irina Dibirova
- (Russia) Trainer: Dmitry Kovalev
- (Croatia) Fitness coach: Danijel Jurišić
- (Russia) Goalkeeper coach: Victor Shponko
- (Serbia) Physiotherapist: Aleksandar Matić
- (Russia) Team leader: Artur Sazonov
- (Russia) Team doctor: Rami Fayssal Sleiman
- (Russia) Masseur: Sergei Yagelovich
- (Russia) Administrator: Maxim Shchennikov

=== Individual award winners in EHF Champions League ===
Season	Player	Award
2017–18	(Russia) Yulia Managarova	All-star team (right wing)
2017–18	(France) Siraba Dembélé	All-star team (left wing)
2018–19	(Russia) Anna Vyakhireva	All-star team (right back)
2019–20	(Russia) Anna Vyakhireva	All-star team (right back)

== Honours ==
=== Russia ===
- Russian Super League
  - Winners: 1994, 2015, 2017, 2018, 2019, 2020, 2022, 2026
  - Runners-up: 1993, 1995, 2011, 2012, 2013, 2016, 2021, 2023, 2024, 2025
  - Third place: 1996, 1997, 2001, 2002, 2003, 2004, 2005, 2010, 2014
- Russian Cup
  - Winners: 2007, 2008, 2012, 2013, 2015, 2016, 2017, 2018, 2019, 2020, 2021, 2025
  - Runners-up: 2010, 2011, 2022, 2024, 2026
- Russian Supercup
  - Winners: 2015, 2016, 2017, 2018, 2019, 2020, 2021, 2025
  - Runners-up: 2022, 2024, 2026

=== Soviet Union ===
- Soviet Handball Championship
  - Winners: 1990, 1991
  - Runners-up: 1979, 1980, 1981, 1982, 1989
  - Third place: 1976, 1988
- Soviet Union National Cup
  - Winners: 1980, 1982

=== European competitions ===
- EHF Champions League
  - Runners-up: 2018–19
  - Fourth place: 2017–18
- Women's EHF Cup
  - Winners: 2016–17
  - Runners-up: 2014–15
- EHF Cup Winners' Cup
  - Winners: 1990

=== Other tournaments ===
- Baia Mare Champions Trophy
  - Fourth place: 2014
- Bucharest Trophy
  - Fourth place: 2014, 2015

== European record ==
All results (home and away) list Rostov-Don's goal tally first.

Season	Competition	Round	Club	Home	Away	Aggregate
2017–18	Champions League	Group stage (Group B)	(Hungary) Győri ETO KC	23–22	23–25	2nd
2017–18	Champions League	Group stage (Group B)	(Denmark) FC Midtjylland	27–20	21–24	2nd
2017–18	Champions League	Group stage (Group B)	(France) Brest Bretagne	26–24	29–23	2nd
2017–18	Champions League	Main round (Group 1)	(Denmark) Nykøbing Falster	32–22	29–25	2nd
2017–18	Champions League	Main round (Group 1)	(Slovenia) RK Krim	29–22	35–26	2nd
2017–18	Champions League	Main round (Group 1)	(Romania) CSM București	25–24	22–22	2nd
2017–18	Champions League	Quarterfinals	(Hungary) FTC-Rail Cargo Hungaria	32–22	31–29	63–51
2017–18	Champions League	Semifinals	(North Macedonia) HC Vardar	19–25		
2017–18	Champions League	Third place	(Romania) CSM București	30–31		
2018–19	Champions League	Group stage (Group B)	(Denmark) København Håndbold	30–25	27–21	1st
2018–19	Champions League	Group stage (Group B)	(Sweden) IK Sävehof	30–21	32–26	1st
2018–19	Champions League	Group stage (Group B)	(France) Brest Bretagne	30–24	29–29	1st
2018–19	Champions League	Main round (Group 1)	(France) Metz Handball	18–26	25–29	2nd
2018–19	Champions League	Main round (Group 1)	(Montenegro) ŽRK Budućnost	24–22	23–20	2nd
2018–19	Champions League	Main round (Group 1)	(Denmark) Odense Håndbold	25–19	30–26	2nd
2018–19	Champions League	Quarterfinals	(Hungary) FTC-Rail Cargo Hungaria	33–22	29–26	62–48
2018–19	Champions League	Semifinals	(France) Metz Handball	27–25		
2018–19	Champions League	Final	(Hungary) Győri ETO KC	24–25		
2019–20	Champions League	Group stage (Group B)	(Denmark) Team Esbjerg	34–26	26–31	1st
2019–20	Champions League	Group stage (Group B)	(Poland) MKS Lublin	31–21	30–20	1st
2019–20	Champions League	Group stage (Group B)	(Romania) CSM București	23–22	23–23	1st
2019–20	Champions League	Main round (Group 1)	(France) Metz Handball	24–29	20–23	3rd
2019–20	Champions League	Main round (Group 1)	(Norway) Vipers Kristiansand	33–26	32–29	3rd
2019–20	Champions League	Main round (Group 1)	(Hungary) FTC-Rail Cargo Hungaria	29–26	35–31	3rd
2019–20	Champions League	Quarterfinals	(France) Brest Bretagne Handball	Cancelled		
2020–21	Champions League	Group stage (Group A)	(France) Metz Handball	30–26	26–27	1st
2020–21	Champions League	Group stage (Group A)	(Norway) Vipers Kristiansand	10–0 (Note: The matches could not be played and were assessed by the EHF.)	24–23	1st
2020–21	Champions League	Group stage (Group A)	(Denmark) Team Esbjerg	28–24	25–24	1st
2020–21	Champions League	Group stage (Group A)	(Hungary) FTC-Rail Cargo Hungaria	26–24	26–25	1st
2020–21	Champions League	Group stage (Group A)	(Romania) CSM București	0–10	27–22	1st
2020–21	Champions League	Group stage (Group A)	(Germany) SG BBM Bietigheim	27–21	32–31	1st
2020–21	Champions League	Group stage (Group A)	(Slovenia) RK Krim	23–23	27–28	1st
2020–21	Champions League	Round of 16	(Croatia) Podravka Vegeta	42–24	29–20	71–44
2020–21	Champions League	Quarterfinals	(Norway) Vipers Kristiansand	23–23 (Note: Both matches were played in Rostov-on-Don, with "home" and "away" being used for administrative purposes.)	27–34	50–57

== Head coach history ==
- (Russia) Sergey Belitsky (2002–2006)
- (Russia) Olga Karpenko (2006–2007)
- (Russia) Mikhail Aksenov (2007–2009)
- (Russia) Sergey Belitsky (2009–2014)
- (Denmark) Jan Leslie (2014–2016)
- (France) Frédéric Bougeant (2016–2018)
- (Spain) Ambros Martin (2018–2020)
- (Sweden) Per Johansson (2020–2022)
- (Slovakia) Tomáš Hlavatý (2022) (interim)
- (Russia) Eduard Koksharov (2022–2023)
- (Russia) Alexander Burmistrov (2023) (interim)
- (Russia) Irina Dibirova (2023–present)
