= Tjaša Stanko =

Slovenian handball player

Personal information
- Nationality: Slovenian
- Born: 5 November 1997 (age 29) Maribor, Slovenia
- Height: 1.73 m (5 ft 8 in)

Sport
- Sport: Handball
- Position: Left back
- Current club: Győri ETO KC
- Number: 15

Youth career
- Years: Team
- 2005–2015: ŽRK Branik Maribor

Senior clubs
- Years: Team
- 2011–2015: ŽRK Branik Maribor
- 2015–2017: RK Zagorje
- 2017–2019: RK Krim
- 2019–2020: RK Podravka Koprivnica
- 2020–2021: Metz Handball
- 2021–2025: RK Krim
- 2025-: Győri ETO KC
National team
Years	Team	Apps	(Gls)
2015–	Slovenia	129	(569)
Medal record
Mediterranean Games
Bronze medal – third place	2018 Tarragona	Team
- Updated on 11 November 2026

Tjaša Stanko (born 5 November 1997) is a Slovenian handball player who plays for Győri ETO KC and the Slovenia national team.

== Individual awards ==
- All-Star Left Back of the European Championship: 2024
- EHF Champions League Best Young Player: 2017–18
