= Næstved Arena =

Arena in Denmark

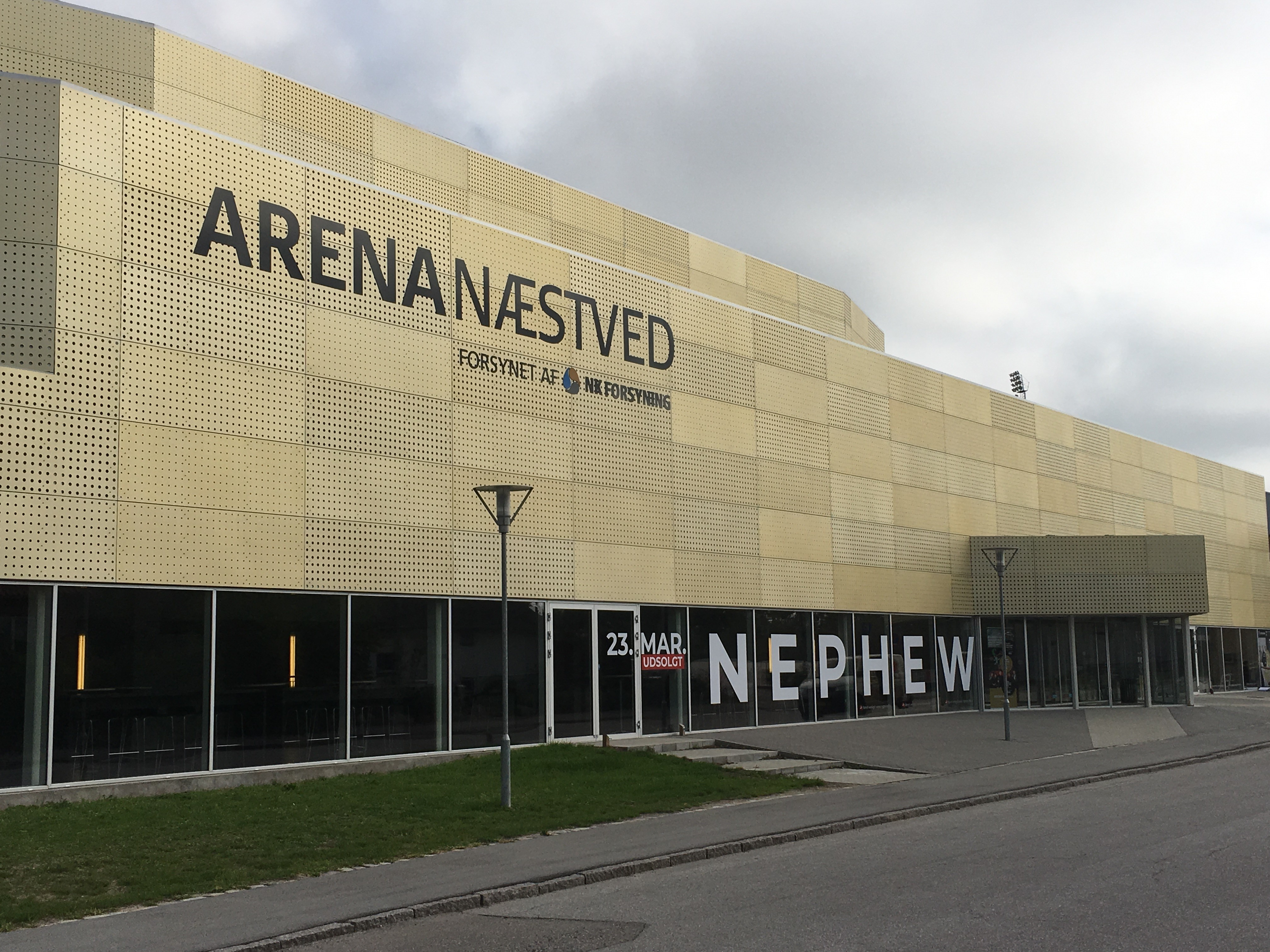

Arena Næstved is a multi purpose arena in Næstved, Denmark.

Construction was postponed multiple times. It opened on 17 November 2015. The first major event in the arena was the 2015 World Women's Handball Championship, played in December 2015. The Dansk Melodi Grand Prix 2023 took place in Arena Næstved. The city council agreed in 2019 to allocate 6 million kroner for upgrades to the arena.

The main arena accommodates audiences of up to 4500, although the total capacity of the complex is around 7000 people.

== See also ==
- Næstved Stadion
