= Charris Rozemalen =

Dutch handball player (born 1991)

Personal information
- Nationality: Dutch
- Born: 16 April 1991 (age 35) Utrecht, Netherlands
- Height: 1.75 m (5 ft 9 in)

Sport
- Sport: Handball
- Position: Right back
- Current club: retired

Senior clubs
- Years: Team
- –2008: U.D.S.V.
- 2008–2009: GOconnectIT/Fortissimo
- 2009–2010: Kiddy World SEW
- 2010–2011: BM Alcobendas
- 2011–2013: VOC Amsterdam
- 2013–2014: Vipers Kristiansand
- 2014–2017: VOC Amsterdam
- 2017–2019: SG BBM Bietigheim
- 2019– 2021: Toulon Saint-Cyr Var Handball
National team
Years	Team	Apps	(Gls)
2017– 2021	Netherlands	25	(32)
Medal record
World Championship
Bronze medal – third place	2017 Germany
European Championship
Bronze medal – third place	2018 France
Youth European Championship
Bronze medal – third place	2007 Slovakia

Charris Rozemalen (born 16 April 1991) is a Dutch female handballer for SG BBM Bietigheim and the Dutch national team.

== Achievements ==
- Dutch Division:
  - Winner: 2017
- Dutch Cup:
  - Winner: 2016
- Dutch Supercup:
  - Winner: 2009, 2016
- EHF Youth European Championship:
  - Bronze Medalist: 2007
