= Yulia Managarova =

Russian handball player (born 1988)

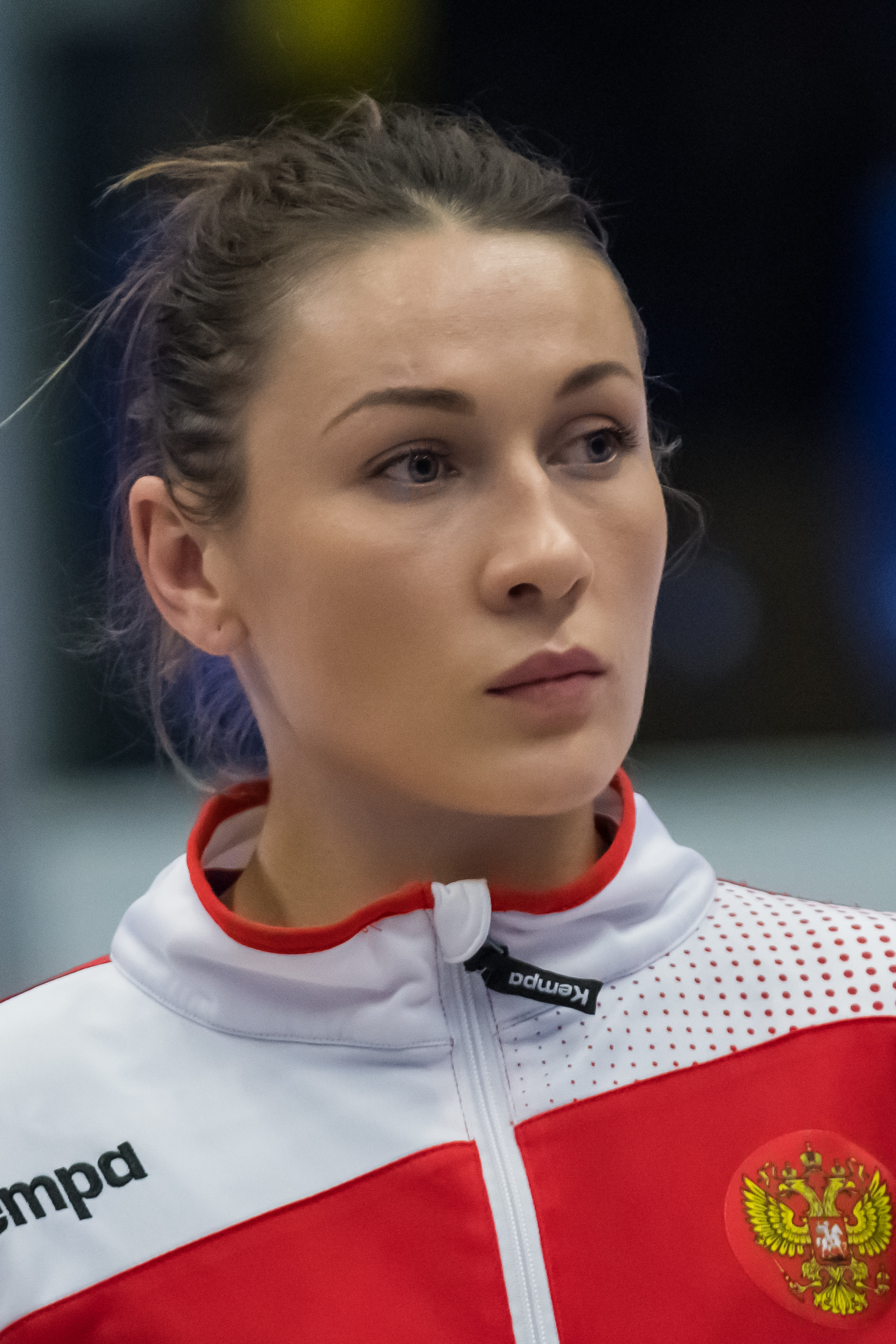
- Managarova in 2017

Personal information
- Full name: Yulia Anatolyevna Managarova
- Nationality: Ukrainian; Russian
- Born: 27 September 1988 (age 38) Kryvyi Rih, Ukrainian SSR, Soviet Union
- Height: 1.67 m (5 ft 6 in)

Sport
- Sport: Handball
- Position: Right wing
- Current club: Rostov-Don
- Number: 6

Senior clubs
- Years: Team
- –2011: HC Sparta
- 2011–2013: CS Oltchim Rm. Vâlcea
- 2013–2024: Rostov-Don
National team
Years	Team	Apps	(Gls)
–2014	Ukraine	46	(187)
2014–	Russia	54	(177)
Medal record
Representing ROC
Olympic Games
Silver medal – second place	2020 Tokyo	Team
Representing Russia
World Championship
Bronze medal – third place	2019 Japan	Team
European Championship
Silver medal – second place	2018 France	Team

Yulia Anatolyevna Managarova (Russian: Юлия Анатольевна Манагарова, IPA: [ˈjʉlʲɪjə mənɐˈɡarəvə]; born 27 September 1988) is a Russian handballer retired.

She played for the Ukrainian national team until 2014.

== Personal life ==
Managarova decided to take the Russian citizenship because of several reasons. She stated, that since the Revolution of Dignity, handball in Ukraine is in a miserable state, mostly due to financial difficulties. On the question which country and city she likes most, Managarova called Russia and Kyiv, stating that her move was not easy.

== International honours ==
- European Championship:
  - Silver Medalist: 2018
- EHF Champions League:
  - Semifinalist: 2012, 2013

== Individual awards ==
- Team of the Tournament Right Wing of the Baia Mare Champions Trophy: 2014
- All-Star Right Wing of Møbelringen Cup: 2017
- All-Star Right Wing of the EHF Champions League: 2018
