= Iveta Korešová =

Czech handball player

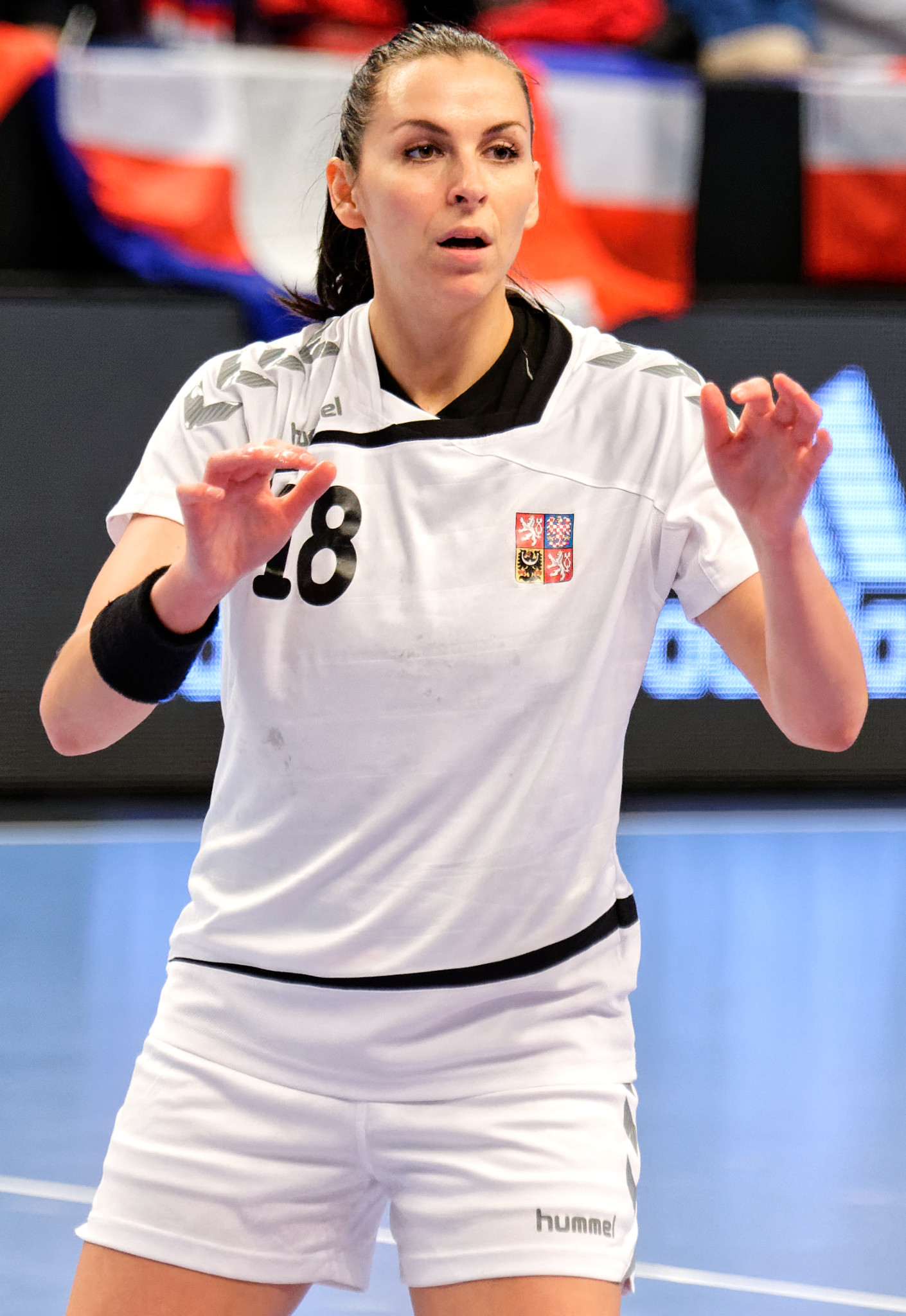
- Luzumová in 2015

Personal information
- Nationality: Czech
- Born: 3 April 1989 (age 37) Písek, Czechoslovakia
- Height: 1.76 m (5 ft 9 in)

Sport
- Sport: Handball
- Position: Centre back
- Current club: TJ Sokol Písek

Youth career
- Years: Team
- –: TJ Sokol Písek

Senior clubs
- Years: Team
- 1997-2011: TJ Sokol Písek
- 2012-2013: Mios Biganos
- 2013-2021: Thüringer HC
- 2021-2022: DHK Baník Most
- 2022-: TJ Sokol Písek
National team
Years	Team	Apps	(Gls)
2009–2025	Czech Republic	113	(498)
- Updated on 1 October 2025

Iveta Luzumová (3 April 1989 born Luzumová ) is a Czech handball player for TJ Sokol Písek and the Czech national team.

She participated at the 2018 European Women's Handball Championship.

On 28 September 2025, she announced her retirement from the National team.

== Individual awards ==
- Handball-Bundesliga Top Scorer: 2018, 2019
