= Rostov-on-Don Palace of Sports =

Stadium in Rostov-on-Don, Russia

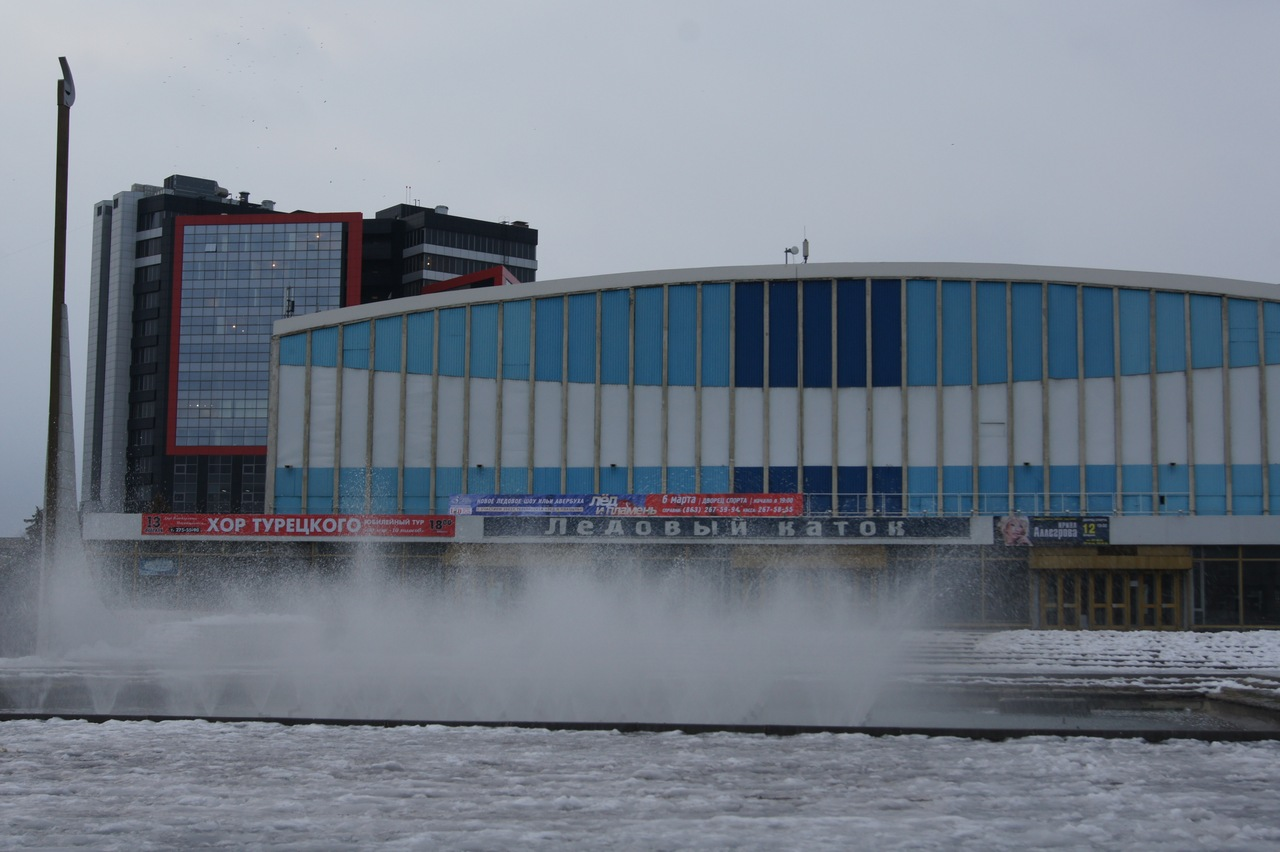
- Interactive map of Rostov-on-Don Palace of Sports
- Full name: Rostov-on-Don Palace of Sports
- Location: 103 Khalturinsky lane, Rostov-on-Don, Russia
- Coordinates: 47°13′41″N 39°41′48″E
- Elevation: (Floor count; 2)
- Owner: Government of the Rostov region
- Capacity: Ice Hockey: 3 500; Basketball: 5 000; Concert : 7 000; 1967 – 2022: 2 360

Construction
- Groundbreaking: 1966
- Built: 1966 – 1967
- Opened: 20 October 1967; 59 years ago
- Renovated: January 2023 – December 2024
- Closed: 18 December 2022
- Cost: Renovated: ₽ 1,6 billion (€ 16,1 million in 2024)
- Architects: Design Institute Soyuzsportproekt: M.A. Aristov, Yu.A. Regentov (Model project No. 2C-09-35 (140-69))
- Builders: Renovated: Government of the Rostov region
- Project managers: Renovated: GBU DO RO SOR No. 8 named after V.V. Ponedelnika
- Structural engineer: S.N. Badmaeva of Design Institute Soyuzsportproekt
- General contractors: Renovated: Southern Construction Company LLC

Tenants
- Rostov-Don Handball Club; HC Rostov

Rostov-on-Don Palace of Sports is a multi-purpose indoor arena in Rostov-on-Don, Russia. It is the home of the women's handball club Rostov-Don, one of the top teams of the Russian championship. They also regularly play in the Women's EHF Champions League. Besides handball, it also hosts other indoor sports including ice hockey, as well as concerts and other events.

== See also ==
- List of indoor arenas in Russia
