= Ikast-Brande Arena =

Indoor sports arena in Ikast, Denmark

Coordinates: 56°8′40″N 9°8′39″E

IBF Arena is an indoor sports arena in Ikast, Denmark primarily used for handball. It can hold 2,550 spectators (with a further 300 in a standing area if needed) and is home to Ikast Håndbold. It was called Sportscenter Ikast until June 2008. It is also used as a polling station during Danish elections.

It was built in 1968.
