= Milena Raičević =

Montenegrin handball player (born 1990)

Personal information
- Nationality: Montenegrin
- Born: 12 March 1990 (age 36) Titograd, SR Montenegro, SFR Yugoslavia
- Height: 1.78 m (5 ft 10 in)

Sport
- Sport: Handball
- Position: Centre back
- Current club: Retired
- Number: 90

Senior clubs
- Years: Team
- 2007–2021: ŽRK Budućnost Podgorica
- 2021–2022: Kastamonu
- 2022–2023: ŽRK Budućnost Podgorica
- 2023-2024: Rapid București
National team
Years	Team	Apps	(Gls)
2007–2024	Montenegro	172	(510)
Medal record
Olympic Games
Silver medal – second place	2012 London	Team
European Championship
Gold medal – first place	2012 Serbia
Bronze medal – third place	2022 Slovenia/North Macedonia/Montenegro
Mediterranean Games
Bronze medal – third place	2009 Pescara	Team
Junior World Championship
Bronze medal – third place	2010 South Korea

Milena Raičević née Knežević, (born 12 March 1990) is a retired Montenegrin international handballer for the Montenegrin national team.

== International career ==
She was part of the Montenegro international set-up since the younger age categories and won the bronze medal at the 2010 Junior World Championship. She made her championship debut in the 2010 European Women's Handball Championship. A year later she participated at the 2011 World Women's Handball Championship in Brazil. In 2012, she participated in the 2012 Olympic Games in London where she was a silver medalist after Montenegro lost the final match against Norway 26–23. Later in 2012 she became a European Champion with Montenegro when they took revenge against Norway in the final at the 2012 European Women's Handball Championship, winning the final 34–31 after overtime. Knežević scored 10 goals in the final game and a total of 41 in the championship. She later was part of the Montenegrin teams during the 2013 World Women's Handball Championship, 2014 European Women's Handball Championship, 2015 World Women's Handball Championship, 2016 Olympic Games and the 2016 European Women's Handball Championship. Raičević was named captain of the Montenegrin national team in 2016.

== Club career ==
Raičević has represented ŽRK Budućnost Podgorica her entire senior career. She was part of the clubs squad in the 2007/2008 season, but she didn't play her first European Cup-match until the 2008/2009 season. She ended up with a total of 42 goals during the EHF Women's Champions League 2008/09 season. ŽRK Budućnost Podgorica has won all of the Montenegrin Championship and Cup titles ever since the inaugural season of 2006/07, meaning Raičević has 8 championship titles and 8 cup titles. She's also a double winner of the EHF Women's Champions League winner with Budućnost, having won the competition in 2012 and 2015. She also won the EHF Women's Cup Winners' Cup the 2009–2010 season, scoring 16 goals in 8 matches. As of 5 March 2017 she has played 105 matches in the EHF Women's Champions League and scored 290 goals.

== Personal life ==
Milena Knežević started playing handball with her twin sister Dragana when they were young. Dragana Knežević played one European Cup season for WHC "Petrol Bonus" Podgorica in 2007/2008. Her older brother Ivan Knežević is a Montenegrin soccer player. Milena Knežević married Marko Raičević in 2015, and parts of their wedding can be seen in a YouTube video. She made headlines when she lost her temper during an EHF Women's Champions League-match against Győri Audi ETO KC when she headbutted Hungarian handballer Anita Görbicz in 2014. She was later banned for 2 matches for this incident. She later issued an apology on her Facebook-page directed at Görbicz, her club and the fans.

== Achievements ==
- Montenegrin Championship:
  - Winner: 2007, 2008, 2009, 2010, 2011, 2012, 2013, 2014, 2015, 2016, 2017, 2018, 2019, 2021
- Montenegrin Cup:
  - Winner: 2007, 2008, 2009, 2010, 2011, 2012, 2013, 2014, 2015, 2016, 2017, 2018, 2019, 2021
- Women's Regional Handball League:
  - Winner: 2010, 2011, 2012, 2013, 2014, 2015, 2016, 2019
- EHF Champions League:
  - Winner: 2012, 2015
  - Finalist: 2014
  - Semifinalist: 2011
- European Championship:
  - Winner: 2012
- Olympic Games:
  - Silver Medalist: 2012
- EHF Cup Winners' Cup:
  - Winner: 2010
- Junior World Championship:
  - Bronze Medalist: 2010

== Honors ==
- Junior World Championship:
  - Best left back: 2010
- EHF Women's Champions League:
  - Third best goal scorer: 2012/2013: 86 goals
