= Nycke Groot =

Dutch handball player (born 1988)

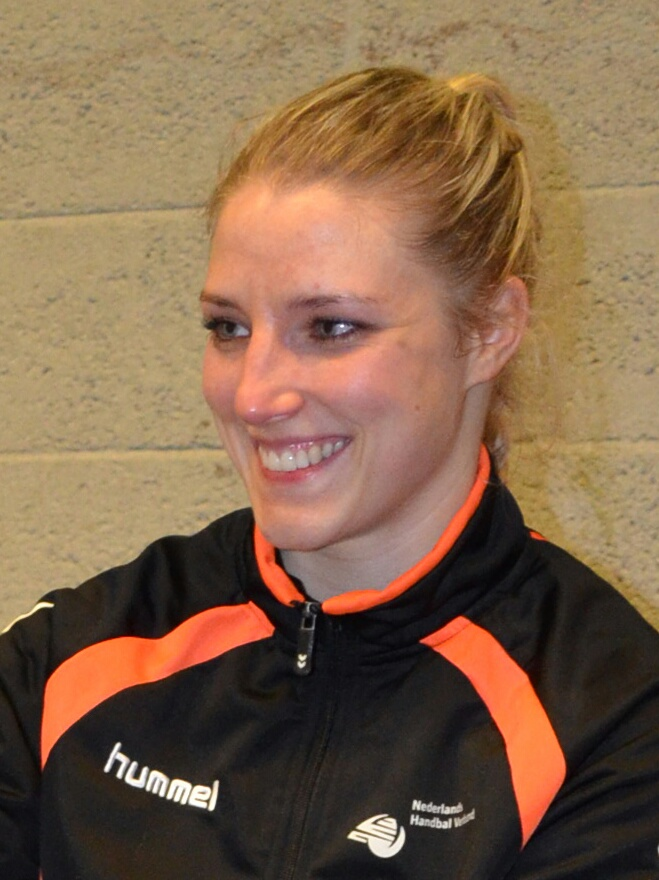
- Nycke Groot after the match Netherlands-Slovakia, March 21, 2015, Arnhem.

Personal information
- Full name: Cornelia Nycke Groot
- Nationality: Dutch
- Born: 4 May 1988 (age 38) Alkmaar, Netherlands
- Height: 1.75 m (5 ft 9 in)

Sport
- Sport: Handball
- Position: Centre back

Senior clubs
- Years: Team
- 2001–2003: Kolping
- 2003–2008: West-Friesland SEW
- 2008–2011: Team Tvis Holstebro
- 2011–2015: FC Midtjylland
- 2015–2019: Győri ETO KC
- 2019–2021: Odense Håndbold
- 2022: Odense Håndbold
National team
| Years | Team | Apps | (Gls) |
| 2004–2021 | Netherlands | 150 | (439) |

Teams managed
- 2025-: Denmark U18 (assistant)
Medal record
World Championship
| Silver medal – second place | 2015 Denmark |
| Bronze medal – third place | 2017 Germany |
European Championship
| Silver medal – second place | 2016 Sweden |
| Bronze medal – third place | 2018 France |

Cornelia Nycke Groot (born 4 May 1988) is a Dutch handball player and coach.

She represented the Netherlands in three World Women's Handball Championship (winning a silver in Denmark 2015, and a bronze in Germany 2017) and two editions of the Olympic Games.

In January 2019, 14 years after debuting on the Dutch national team, she announced she would be retiring from the national team to focus on her club career.

In 2021, Groot announced she would participate with the Netherlands at the Tokyo Olympic Games. She also announced the end of her club career.

In November 2025 she became the assistant coach of the Danish U18 national team.

== Achievements ==
=== National team ===
- World Championship:
  - Silver Medalist: 2015
  - Bronze Medalist: 2017
- European Championship:
  - Silver Medalist: 2016
  - Bronze Medalist: 2018

=== European competitions ===
- EHF Champions League
  - Winner: 2017, 2018, 2019
  - Finalist: 2016
  - Semifinalist: 2014
- EHF Cup:
  - Finalist: 2011
  - Semifinalist: 2013
- EHF Cup Winners' Cup:
  - Winner: 2015

=== Domestic competitions ===
- Danish Championship:
  - Winner: 2013, 2015, 2021
  - Silver Medalist: 2014
  - Bronze Medalist: 2012
- Danish Cup:
  - Winner: 2012, 2014, 2020, 2021
  - Finalist: 2010, 2013
- Nemzeti Bajnokság I
  - Gold Medalist: 2016, 2017, 2018, 2019
- Magyar Kupa
  - Gold Medalist: 2016, 2018, 2019

== Individual awards ==
- All-Star Team Best Centre Back of the EHF Champions League: 2016, 2017
- MVP of the EHF Champions League Final four: 2017
- All-Star Team Best Centre Back of the European Championship: 2016
- MVP of the European Women's Handball Championship: 2016
- MVP (Danish: pokalfighter) of the Danish Handball Cup: 2010, 2012, 2014
- MVP of the Hungarian Cup Final Four: 2019
- Foreign Handballer of the Year in Hungary: 2016, 2018
- World Handball Female Playmaker of the Decade
