= Ana Gros =

Slovenian handball player

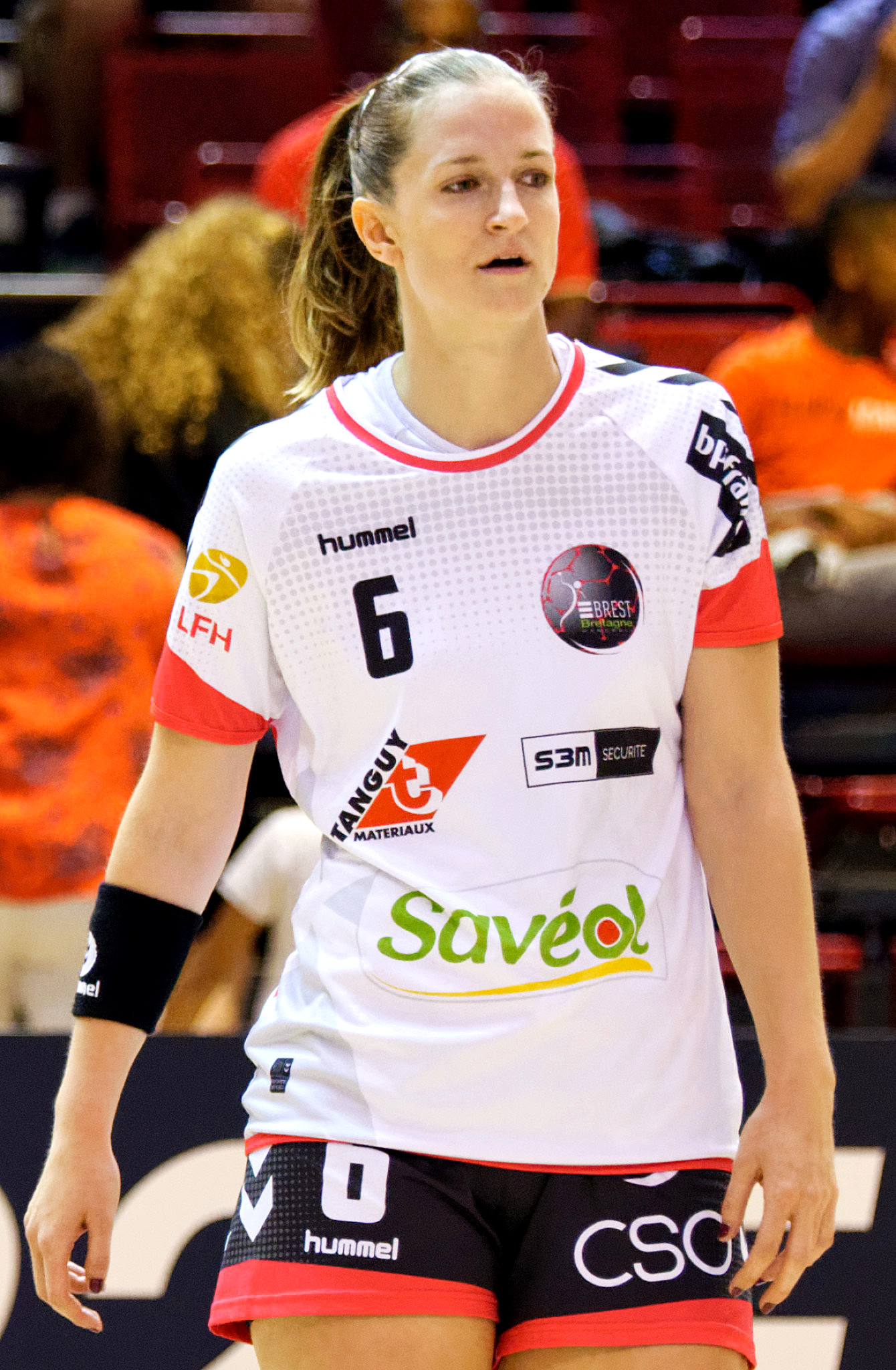
- Gros in 2018

Personal information
- Nationality: Slovenian
- Born: 21 January 1991 (age 35) Slovenj Gradec, Slovenia, Yugoslavia
- Height: 1.86 m (6 ft 1 in)

Sport
- Sport: Handball
- Position: Right back
- Current club: Brest Bretagne Handball
- Number: 6

Youth career
- Years: Team
- 2001–2005: ŽRK Velenje
- 2005–2008: RK Krim Mercator

Senior clubs
- Years: Team
- 2008–2009: RK Olimpija
- 2009–2010: RK Krim
- 2010–2012: Győri ETO KC
- 2012–2013: Thüringer HC
- 2014–2018: Metz Handball
- 2018–2021: Brest Bretagne
- 2021–2022: CSKA Moscow
- 2022: RK Krim
- 2022–2024: Győri ETO KC
- 2024–2025: RK Krim
- 2025–: Brest Bretagne
National team
Years	Team	Apps	(Gls)
2007–2024	Slovenia	159	(767)
Medal record
Women's handball
Representing Slovenia
Mediterranean Games
Silver medal – second place	2013 Mersin	Team

Ana Gros (born 21 January 1991) is a Slovenian professional handballer who plays for French team Brest Bretagne Handball.

She played for Slovenia for 17 years and was the team captain for seven years. She retired from the national team in September 2024, having played 159 matches and scored a record 767 goals, 81 more than the second-best scorer of all time Tanja Oder.

Gros played at five European championships, four World championships, and once at the 2024 Summer Olympics.

On club level, as of September 2024, she is 6th on the Champions League all-time top scorers list, 12th on the Champions League finals all-time top scorers list, and was the top scorer in the top European league in season 2020-21.

== Achievements ==
- Slovenian Championship:
  - Winner: 2010, 2022,2025
- Slovenian Cup:
  - Winner: 2010, 2025
- Nemzeti Bajnokság I:
  - Winner: 2011, 2012, 2023
- Magyar Kupa:
  - Winner: 2011, 2012
- German Championship:
  - Winner: 2013
- French Championship:
  - Winner: 2014, 2016, 2017, 2018, 2021
- French Cup:
  - Winner: 2015, 2017, 2021
- French League Cup:
  - Winner: 2014
- EHF Champions League:
  - Winner: 2024
  - Finalist: 2012, 2021
  - Semifinalist: 2011, 2023

== Individual awards ==
- French Championship Top Scorer: 2016, 2018
- EHF Champions League Top Scorer: 2021
- French Championship Best Right Back: 2015, 2016, 2017, 2018, 2019, 2020
- MVP of French Championship: 2021
- All-Star Right Back of the EHF Champions League: 2018
- EHF Excellence Awards Best right back of the season: 2022/23

Olympic Games
Preceded by Eva Terčelj and Bojan Tokić	Flagbearer for Slovenia; Paris 2024	Succeeded by Incumbent
