= 2018–19 Women's EHF Champions League group stage =

The 2018–19 Women's EHF Champions League group stage began on 5 October and was concluded on 18 November 2018. A total of 16 teams competed for 12 places in the main round of the 2018–19 Women's EHF Champions League.

== Draw ==
The draw for the group stage was held on 29 June 2018.

=== Seedings ===
The seedings were announced on 20 June 2018.

Pot 1	Pot 2	Pot 3	Pot 4
(Hungary) Győri Audi ETO KC (Romania) CSM București (Montenegro) ŽRK Budućnost (Russia) Rostov-Don	(France) Metz Handball (Denmark) København Håndbold (Norway) Vipers Kristiansand (Germany) Thüringer HC	(Slovenia) RK Krim (Sweden) IK Sävehof (Hungary) FTC-Rail Cargo Hungaria (Denmark) Odense Håndbold	(France) Brest Bretagne Handball (Norway) Larvik HK; Qualifier 1 Qualifier 2

== Format ==
In each group, teams played against each other in a double round-robin format, with home and away matches. After completion of the group stage matches, the top three teams advanced to the main round. Teams were not able to face opponents from the same country in the group.

== Tiebreakers ==
In the group stage, teams were ranked according to points (2 points for a win, 1 point for a draw, 0 points for a loss). After completion of the group stage, if two or more teams had scored the same number of points, the ranking was determined as follows:

1. Highest number of points in matches between the teams directly involved;
2. Superior goal difference in matches between the teams directly involved;
3. Highest number of goals scored in matches between the teams directly involved (or in the away match in case of a two-team tie);
4. Superior goal difference in all matches of the group;
5. Highest number of plus goals in all matches of the group;

If the ranking of one of these teams is determined, the above criteria are consecutively followed until the ranking of all teams is determined. If no ranking can be determined, a decision shall be obtained by EHF through drawing of lots.

== Groups ==
The matchdays were 5–7 October, 12–14 October, 19–21 October, 2–4 November, 9–11 November, 16–18 November 2018.

=== Group A ===
Pos	Team	Pld	W	D	L	GF	GA	GD	Pts	Qualification
1	(France) Metz Handball	6	4	1	1	166	133	+33	9	Main round
2	(Montenegro) ŽRK Budućnost	6	4	0	2	152	142	+10	8	Main round
3	(Denmark) Odense Håndbold	6	2	1	3	155	165	−10	5	Main round
4	(Norway) Larvik HK	6	1	0	5	137	170	−33	2	EHF Cup

Source: EHF
Rules for classification: Tiebreakers

6 October 2018; 19:00	ŽRK Budućnost (Montenegro)	31–28	(Denmark) Odense Håndbold	Morača Sports Center, Podgorica; Attendance: 2,225; Referees: Horváth, Marton (HUN)
6 October 2018; 19:00	Jauković 8	(17–12)	Jørgensen 8	Morača Sports Center, Podgorica; Attendance: 2,225; Referees: Horváth, Marton (HUN)
6 October 2018; 19:00	3× (yellow card) 5× (suspension)	Report	3× (yellow card) 7× (suspension)	Morača Sports Center, Podgorica; Attendance: 2,225; Referees: Horváth, Marton (HUN)

7 October 2018; 15:00	Metz Handball (France)	31–20	(Norway) Larvik HK	Arènes de Metz, Metz; Attendance: 3,349; Referees: Merz, Schilha (GER)
7 October 2018; 15:00	Maubon 6	(16–8)	Hjertner 8	Arènes de Metz, Metz; Attendance: 3,349; Referees: Merz, Schilha (GER)
7 October 2018; 15:00	2× (yellow card) 2× (suspension) 1× (red card)	Report	2× (yellow card) 2× (suspension)	Arènes de Metz, Metz; Attendance: 3,349; Referees: Merz, Schilha (GER)

13 October 2018; 18:15	Larvik HK (Norway)	23–22	(Montenegro) ŽRK Budućnost	Boligmappa Arena Larvik, Larvik; Attendance: 1,150; Referees: Bennani, Bennani (SWE)
13 October 2018; 18:15	Molid 6	(12–12)	Bulatović, Raičević 5	Boligmappa Arena Larvik, Larvik; Attendance: 1,150; Referees: Bennani, Bennani (SWE)
13 October 2018; 18:15	1× (yellow card) 3× (suspension)	Report	3× (yellow card) 5× (suspension)	Boligmappa Arena Larvik, Larvik; Attendance: 1,150; Referees: Bennani, Bennani (SWE)

14 October 2018; 15:10	Odense Håndbold (Denmark)	19–19	(France) Metz Handball	Sparrekassen Fyn Arena, Odense; Attendance: 3,528; Referees: Pandžić, Mosorinski (SRB)
14 October 2018; 15:10	Jørgensen 6	(10–10)	Zaadi 5	Sparrekassen Fyn Arena, Odense; Attendance: 3,528; Referees: Pandžić, Mosorinski (SRB)
14 October 2018; 15:10	3× (yellow card) 3× (suspension)	Report	3× (yellow card) 2× (suspension)	Sparrekassen Fyn Arena, Odense; Attendance: 3,528; Referees: Pandžić, Mosorinski (SRB)

19 October 2018; 18:45	Larvik HK (Norway)	25–33	(Denmark) Odense Håndbold	Boligmappa Arena Larvik, Larvik; Attendance: 1,414; Referees: Stark, Ştefan (ROU)
19 October 2018; 18:45	Christensen 6	(13–16)	Højlund 8	Boligmappa Arena Larvik, Larvik; Attendance: 1,414; Referees: Stark, Ştefan (ROU)
19 October 2018; 18:45	3× (yellow card) 1× (suspension)	Report	3× (yellow card) 5× (suspension)	Boligmappa Arena Larvik, Larvik; Attendance: 1,414; Referees: Stark, Ştefan (ROU)

21 October 2018; 17:00	Metz Handball (France)	25–24	(Montenegro) ŽRK Budućnost	Arènes de Metz, Metz; Attendance: 4,438; Referees: Tzaferopoulos, Bethmann (GRE)
21 October 2018; 17:00	Smits 7	(8–11)	Laslo 6	Arènes de Metz, Metz; Attendance: 4,438; Referees: Tzaferopoulos, Bethmann (GRE)
21 October 2018; 17:00	2× (yellow card) 4× (suspension)	Report	3× (yellow card) 4× (suspension)	Arènes de Metz, Metz; Attendance: 4,438; Referees: Tzaferopoulos, Bethmann (GRE)

4 November 2018; 13:30	Odense Håndbold (Denmark)	27–23	(Norway) Larvik HK	Odense Sports Park, Odense; Attendance: 1,887; Referees: Christidi, Papamattheou (GRE)
4 November 2018; 13:30	Østergaard 7	(13–14)	Christensen 5	Odense Sports Park, Odense; Attendance: 1,887; Referees: Christidi, Papamattheou (GRE)
4 November 2018; 13:30	3× (yellow card) 2× (suspension)	Report	3× (yellow card) 2× (suspension)	Odense Sports Park, Odense; Attendance: 1,887; Referees: Christidi, Papamattheou (GRE)

4 November 2018; 19:00	ŽRK Budućnost (Montenegro)	23–19	(France) Metz Handball	Morača Sports Center, Podgorica; Attendance: 2,500; Referees: Mandák, Rudinský (SVK)
4 November 2018; 19:00	Raičević 8	(9–10)	Flippes 8	Morača Sports Center, Podgorica; Attendance: 2,500; Referees: Mandák, Rudinský (SVK)
4 November 2018; 19:00	2× (yellow card) 5× (suspension)	Report	2× (yellow card) 4× (suspension)	Morača Sports Center, Podgorica; Attendance: 2,500; Referees: Mandák, Rudinský (SVK)

10 November 2018; 15:15	Larvik HK (Norway)	21–31	(France) Metz Handball	Boligmappa Arena Larvik, Larvik; Attendance: 778; Referees: Pech, Vagvölgyi (HUN)
10 November 2018; 15:15	Molid 6	(9–15)	Smits 6	Boligmappa Arena Larvik, Larvik; Attendance: 778; Referees: Pech, Vagvölgyi (HUN)
10 November 2018; 15:15	3× (yellow card) 5× (suspension)	Report	2× (yellow card) 4× (suspension)	Boligmappa Arena Larvik, Larvik; Attendance: 778; Referees: Pech, Vagvölgyi (HUN)

11 November 2018; 15:10	Odense Håndbold (Denmark)	22–26	(Montenegro) ŽRK Budućnost	Odense Sports Park, Odense; Attendance: 1,937; Referees: Erdoğan, Özdeniz (TUR)
11 November 2018; 15:10	Østergaard 7	(14–13)	Jauković 8	Odense Sports Park, Odense; Attendance: 1,937; Referees: Erdoğan, Özdeniz (TUR)
11 November 2018; 15:10	2× (yellow card) 4× (suspension)	Report	3× (yellow card) 5× (suspension) 1× (red card)	Odense Sports Park, Odense; Attendance: 1,937; Referees: Erdoğan, Özdeniz (TUR)

17 November 2018; 19:00	ŽRK Budućnost (Montenegro)	26–25	(Norway) Larvik HK	Morača Sports Center, Podgorica; Attendance: 2,843; Referees: Vranes, Wenninger (AUT)
17 November 2018; 19:00	Jauković 9	(13–16)	Molid 8	Morača Sports Center, Podgorica; Attendance: 2,843; Referees: Vranes, Wenninger (AUT)
17 November 2018; 19:00	2× (yellow card) 6× (suspension)	Report	2× (yellow card) 3× (suspension)	Morača Sports Center, Podgorica; Attendance: 2,843; Referees: Vranes, Wenninger (AUT)

18 November 2018; 15:00	Metz Handball (France)	41–26	(Denmark) Odense Håndbold	Arènes de Metz, Metz; Attendance: 4,239; Referees: Alpaidze, Berezkina (RUS)
18 November 2018; 15:00	Houette 8	(21–12)	Højlund 7	Arènes de Metz, Metz; Attendance: 4,239; Referees: Alpaidze, Berezkina (RUS)
18 November 2018; 15:00	2× (yellow card) 3× (suspension)	Report	4× (yellow card) 4× (suspension)	Arènes de Metz, Metz; Attendance: 4,239; Referees: Alpaidze, Berezkina (RUS)

=== Group B ===
Pos	Team	Pld	W	D	L	GF	GA	GD	Pts	Qualification
1	(Russia) Rostov-Don	6	5	1	0	178	146	+32	11	Main round
2	(Denmark) København Håndbold	6	3	1	2	175	157	+18	7	Main round
3	(France) Brest Bretagne Handball	6	2	2	2	182	172	+10	6	Main round
4	(Sweden) IK Sävehof	6	0	0	6	144	204	−60	0	EHF Cup

Source: EHF
Rules for classification: Tiebreakers

6 October 2018; 11:30	Rostov-Don (Russia)	30–21	(Sweden) IK Sävehof	Rostov-on-Don Palace of Sports, Rostov-on-Don; Attendance: 2,109; Referees: Tzaferopoulos, Bethmann (GRE)
6 October 2018; 11:30	Vyakhireva 7	(15–11)	Ekenman-Fernis 5	Rostov-on-Don Palace of Sports, Rostov-on-Don; Attendance: 2,109; Referees: Tzaferopoulos, Bethmann (GRE)
6 October 2018; 11:30	4× (yellow card) 3× (suspension)	Report	2× (yellow card) 3× (suspension)	Rostov-on-Don Palace of Sports, Rostov-on-Don; Attendance: 2,109; Referees: Tzaferopoulos, Bethmann (GRE)

6 October 2018; 13:45	København Håndbold (Denmark)	32–28	(France) Brest Bretagne Handball	Trefor Arena, Brøndby; Attendance: 932; Referees: Brehmer, Skowronek (POL)
6 October 2018; 13:45	Alm 7	(16–18)	Gros, Pop-Lazić 9	Trefor Arena, Brøndby; Attendance: 932; Referees: Brehmer, Skowronek (POL)
6 October 2018; 13:45	3× (yellow card) 1× (suspension)	Report	2× (yellow card)	Trefor Arena, Brøndby; Attendance: 932; Referees: Brehmer, Skowronek (POL)

13 October 2018; 15:00	Brest Bretagne Handball (France)	29–29	(Russia) Rostov-Don	Brest Arena, Brest; Attendance: 3,057; Referees: Florescu, Stoia (ROU)
13 October 2018; 15:00	Gros 8	(15–16)	Sen 10	Brest Arena, Brest; Attendance: 3,057; Referees: Florescu, Stoia (ROU)
13 October 2018; 15:00	3× (yellow card) 1× (suspension)	Report	4× (yellow card) 3× (suspension)	Brest Arena, Brest; Attendance: 3,057; Referees: Florescu, Stoia (ROU)

13 October 2018; 15:30	IK Sävehof (Sweden)	22–36	(Denmark) København Håndbold	Partille Arena, Partille; Attendance: 1,122; Referees: Mitrović, Kažanegra (MNE)
13 October 2018; 15:30	Hallagård, Lundbäck 4	(8–20)	Føns 8	Partille Arena, Partille; Attendance: 1,122; Referees: Mitrović, Kažanegra (MNE)
13 October 2018; 15:30	2× (yellow card) 2× (suspension)	Report	2× (yellow card) 1× (suspension)	Partille Arena, Partille; Attendance: 1,122; Referees: Mitrović, Kažanegra (MNE)

20 October 2018; 13:45	København Håndbold (Denmark)	21–27	(Russia) Rostov-Don	Trefor Arena, Brøndby; Attendance: 1,300; Referees: Pandžić, Mosorinski (SRB)
20 October 2018; 13:45	Blohm, Bont 4	(13–13)	Vyakhireva 9	Trefor Arena, Brøndby; Attendance: 1,300; Referees: Pandžić, Mosorinski (SRB)
20 October 2018; 13:45	2× (yellow card) 4× (suspension)	Report	2× (yellow card) 4× (suspension)	Trefor Arena, Brøndby; Attendance: 1,300; Referees: Pandžić, Mosorinski (SRB)

21 October 2018; 15:00	IK Sävehof (Sweden)	27–39	(France) Brest Bretagne Handball	Partille Arena, Partille; Attendance: 1,290; Referees: Vranes, Wenninger (AUT)
21 October 2018; 15:00	Hallagård 5	(16–19)	Gros, Mangué 8	Partille Arena, Partille; Attendance: 1,290; Referees: Vranes, Wenninger (AUT)
21 October 2018; 15:00	3× (yellow card) 3× (suspension)	Report	2× (yellow card) 3× (suspension)	Partille Arena, Partille; Attendance: 1,290; Referees: Vranes, Wenninger (AUT)

3 November 2018; 14:00	Rostov-Don (Russia)	30–25	(Denmark) København Håndbold	Rostov-on-Don Palace of Sports, Rostov-on-Don; Attendance: 2,815; Referees: Covalciuc, Covalciuc (MDA)
3 November 2018; 14:00	Vyakhireva 7	(15–10)	Hansen 5	Rostov-on-Don Palace of Sports, Rostov-on-Don; Attendance: 2,815; Referees: Covalciuc, Covalciuc (MDA)
3 November 2018; 14:00	2× (yellow card)	Report	3× (yellow card) 1× (suspension)	Rostov-on-Don Palace of Sports, Rostov-on-Don; Attendance: 2,815; Referees: Covalciuc, Covalciuc (MDA)

4 November 2018; 15:00	Brest Bretagne Handball (France)	34–26	(Sweden) IK Sävehof	Brest Arena, Brest; Attendance: 4,200; Referees: Horváth, Marton (HUN)
4 November 2018; 15:00	Coatanea 8	(19–14)	Ekenman-Fernis 6	Brest Arena, Brest; Attendance: 4,200; Referees: Horváth, Marton (HUN)
4 November 2018; 15:00	3× (yellow card) 3× (suspension)	Report	2× (yellow card) 4× (suspension)	Brest Arena, Brest; Attendance: 4,200; Referees: Horváth, Marton (HUN)

10 November 2018; 15:00	Brest Bretagne Handball (France)	28–28	(Denmark) København Håndbold	Brest Arena, Brest; Attendance: 3,541; Referees: Marín, García (ESP)
10 November 2018; 15:00	Gros 8	(14–13)	Mørk 7	Brest Arena, Brest; Attendance: 3,541; Referees: Marín, García (ESP)
10 November 2018; 15:00	1× (yellow card) 4× (suspension)	Report	1× (yellow card) 4× (suspension)	Brest Arena, Brest; Attendance: 3,541; Referees: Marín, García (ESP)

11 November 2018; 16:30	IK Sävehof (Sweden)	26–32	(Russia) Rostov-Don	Partille Arena, Partille; Attendance: 548; Referees: Merz, Schilha (GER)
11 November 2018; 16:30	Ekenman-Fernis 6	(15–14)	Vyakhireva 7	Partille Arena, Partille; Attendance: 548; Referees: Merz, Schilha (GER)
11 November 2018; 16:30	4× (yellow card) 7× (suspension) 2× (red card)	Report	4× (yellow card) 3× (suspension)	Partille Arena, Partille; Attendance: 548; Referees: Merz, Schilha (GER)

17 November 2018; 14:00	Rostov-Don (Russia)	30–24	(France) Brest Bretagne Handball	Rostov-on-Don Palace of Sports, Rostov-on-Don; Attendance: 3,420; Referees: Brunovský, Čanda (SVK)
17 November 2018; 14:00	Vyakhireva 7	(18–12)	Gros 6	Rostov-on-Don Palace of Sports, Rostov-on-Don; Attendance: 3,420; Referees: Brunovský, Čanda (SVK)
17 November 2018; 14:00	2× (yellow card) 2× (suspension)	Report	3× (yellow card) 2× (suspension)	Rostov-on-Don Palace of Sports, Rostov-on-Don; Attendance: 3,420; Referees: Brunovský, Čanda (SVK)

18 November 2018; 13:45	København Håndbold (Denmark)	33–22	(Sweden) IK Sävehof	Trefor Arena, Brøndby; Attendance: 1,256; Referees: Simone, Monitillo (ITA)
18 November 2018; 13:45	Blomstrand 6	(19–6)	Forsberg, Hallagård 4	Trefor Arena, Brøndby; Attendance: 1,256; Referees: Simone, Monitillo (ITA)
18 November 2018; 13:45	3× (yellow card) 1× (suspension)	Report	2× (yellow card) 4× (suspension)	Trefor Arena, Brøndby; Attendance: 1,256; Referees: Simone, Monitillo (ITA)

=== Group C ===
Pos	Team	Pld	W	D	L	GF	GA	GD	Pts	Qualification
1	(Hungary) Győri Audi ETO KC	6	6	0	0	210	140	+70	12	Main round
2	(Slovenia) RK Krim	6	2	2	2	153	164	−11	6	Main round
3	(Germany) Thüringer HC	6	1	1	4	153	173	−20	3 (Note: Thüringer HC 57–51 Podravka Koprivnica)	Main round
4	(Croatia) Podravka Koprivnica	6	1	1	4	142	181	−39	3	EHF Cup

Source: EHF
Rules for classification: Tiebreakers
Notes:

6 October 2018; 19:30	Győri Audi ETO KC (Hungary)	39–23	(Slovenia) RK Krim	Audi Aréna, Győr; Attendance: 5,214; Referees: Sa, Sa (POR)
6 October 2018; 19:30	Amorim 7	(18–9)	Mavsar 5	Audi Aréna, Győr; Attendance: 5,214; Referees: Sa, Sa (POR)
6 October 2018; 19:30	2× (yellow card) 3× (suspension)	Report	2× (yellow card) 3× (suspension)	Audi Aréna, Győr; Attendance: 5,214; Referees: Sa, Sa (POR)

7 October 2018; 14:00	Thüringer HC (Germany)	26–28	(Croatia) Podravka Koprivnica	Wiedigsburghalle, Nordhausen; Attendance: 1,300; Referees: Năstase, Stancu (ROU)
7 October 2018; 14:00	Luzumová, Stolle 6	(11–12)	Yezhykava 7	Wiedigsburghalle, Nordhausen; Attendance: 1,300; Referees: Năstase, Stancu (ROU)
7 October 2018; 14:00	2× (yellow card) 3× (suspension)	Report	2× (yellow card) 10× (suspension) 1× (red card)	Wiedigsburghalle, Nordhausen; Attendance: 1,300; Referees: Năstase, Stancu (ROU)

13 October 2018; 19:00	Krim (Slovenia)	27–20	(Germany) Thüringer HC	Kodeljevo Hall, Ljubljana; Attendance: 1,500; Referees: Vranes, Wenninger (AUT)
13 October 2018; 19:00	Mavsar 7	(10–12)	Luzumová 6	Kodeljevo Hall, Ljubljana; Attendance: 1,500; Referees: Vranes, Wenninger (AUT)
13 October 2018; 19:00	4× (yellow card) 5× (suspension)	Report	3× (yellow card) 6× (suspension)	Kodeljevo Hall, Ljubljana; Attendance: 1,500; Referees: Vranes, Wenninger (AUT)

14 October 2018; 18:45	Podravka Koprivnica (Croatia)	27–33	(Hungary) Győri Audi ETO KC	Gimnazija "Fran Galović", Koprivnica; Attendance: 2,200; Referees: Kijauskaitė, Žalienė (LTU)
14 October 2018; 18:45	Chigirinova 8	(15–17)	Amorim 8	Gimnazija "Fran Galović", Koprivnica; Attendance: 2,200; Referees: Kijauskaitė, Žalienė (LTU)
14 October 2018; 18:45	3× (yellow card) 4× (suspension)	Report	2× (yellow card) 3× (suspension)	Gimnazija "Fran Galović", Koprivnica; Attendance: 2,200; Referees: Kijauskaitė, Žalienė (LTU)

20 October 2018; 18:00	Podravka Koprivnica (Croatia)	27–27	(Slovenia) Krim	Gimnazija "Fran Galović", Koprivnica; Attendance: 2,500; Referees: Alpaidze, Berezkina (RUS)
20 October 2018; 18:00	Chigirinova 5	(15–13)	Mavsar 10	Gimnazija "Fran Galović", Koprivnica; Attendance: 2,500; Referees: Alpaidze, Berezkina (RUS)
20 October 2018; 18:00	3× (yellow card) 5× (suspension)	Report	3× (yellow card) 3× (suspension)	Gimnazija "Fran Galović", Koprivnica; Attendance: 2,500; Referees: Alpaidze, Berezkina (RUS)

21 October 2018; 14:00	Thüringer HC (Germany)	22–38	(Hungary) Győri Audi ETO KC	Wiedigsburghalle, Nordhausen; Attendance: 1,800; Referees: Bennani, Bennani (SWE)
21 October 2018; 14:00	Luzumová 5	(11–15)	Oftedal 6	Wiedigsburghalle, Nordhausen; Attendance: 1,800; Referees: Bennani, Bennani (SWE)
21 October 2018; 14:00	2× (yellow card) 1× (suspension)	Report	1× (yellow card) 3× (suspension)	Wiedigsburghalle, Nordhausen; Attendance: 1,800; Referees: Bennani, Bennani (SWE)

3 November 2018; 19:00	Krim (Slovenia)	27–20	(Croatia) Podravka Koprivnica	Kodeljevo Hall, Ljubljana; Attendance: 2,000; Referees: Christiansen, Hansen (DEN)
3 November 2018; 19:00	Tsàkalou 6	(14–10)	Milosavljević 5	Kodeljevo Hall, Ljubljana; Attendance: 2,000; Referees: Christiansen, Hansen (DEN)
3 November 2018; 19:00	2× (yellow card) 4× (suspension)	Report	2× (yellow card) 4× (suspension)	Kodeljevo Hall, Ljubljana; Attendance: 2,000; Referees: Christiansen, Hansen (DEN)

5 November 2018; 19:00	Győri Audi ETO KC (Hungary)	31–28	(Germany) Thüringer HC	Audi Aréna, Győr; Attendance: 5,500; Referees: Praštalo, Balvan (BIH)
5 November 2018; 19:00	Hansen 6	(19–15)	Stolle 8	Audi Aréna, Győr; Attendance: 5,500; Referees: Praštalo, Balvan (BIH)
5 November 2018; 19:00	4× (yellow card) 1× (suspension)	Report	4× (yellow card) 4× (suspension)	Audi Aréna, Győr; Attendance: 5,500; Referees: Praštalo, Balvan (BIH)

10 November 2018; 15:00	Krim (Slovenia)	23–32	(Hungary) Győri Audi ETO KC	Kodeljevo Hall, Ljubljana; Attendance: 1,700; Referees: Năstase, Stancu (ROU)
10 November 2018; 15:00	Zulič 5	(10–16)	Amorim 7	Kodeljevo Hall, Ljubljana; Attendance: 1,700; Referees: Năstase, Stancu (ROU)
10 November 2018; 15:00	2× (yellow card) 4× (suspension)	Report	2× (yellow card) 4× (suspension)	Kodeljevo Hall, Ljubljana; Attendance: 1,700; Referees: Năstase, Stancu (ROU)

11 November 2018; 18:00	Podravka Koprivnica (Croatia)	23–31	(Germany) Thüringer HC	Gimnazija "Fran Galović", Koprivnica; Attendance: 2,500; Referees: Antić, Jakovljević (SRB)
11 November 2018; 18:00	Chigirinova 8	(10–14)	Luzumová 10	Gimnazija "Fran Galović", Koprivnica; Attendance: 2,500; Referees: Antić, Jakovljević (SRB)
11 November 2018; 18:00	2× (yellow card) 1× (suspension)	Report	2× (yellow card) 5× (suspension)	Gimnazija "Fran Galović", Koprivnica; Attendance: 2,500; Referees: Antić, Jakovljević (SRB)

17 November 2018; 15:30	Thüringer HC (Germany)	26–26	(Slovenia) Krim	Wiedigsburghalle, Nordhausen; Attendance: 1,400; Referees: Kijauskaitė, Žalienė (LTU)
17 November 2018; 15:30	Lang 7	(14–16)	Tsàkalou 7	Wiedigsburghalle, Nordhausen; Attendance: 1,400; Referees: Kijauskaitė, Žalienė (LTU)
17 November 2018; 15:30	4× (yellow card) 3× (suspension)	Report	2× (yellow card) 3× (suspension)	Wiedigsburghalle, Nordhausen; Attendance: 1,400; Referees: Kijauskaitė, Žalienė (LTU)

17 November 2018; 19:30	Győri Audi ETO KC (Hungary)	37–17	(Croatia) Podravka Koprivnica	Audi Aréna, Győr; Attendance: 5,330; Referees: Ilieva, Karbeska (MKD)
17 November 2018; 19:30	Kristiansen 6	(17–9)	Chigirinova 4	Audi Aréna, Győr; Attendance: 5,330; Referees: Ilieva, Karbeska (MKD)
17 November 2018; 19:30	3× (yellow card)	Report	3× (yellow card) 2× (suspension)	Audi Aréna, Győr; Attendance: 5,330; Referees: Ilieva, Karbeska (MKD)

=== Group D ===
Pos	Team	Pld	W	D	L	GF	GA	GD	Pts	Qualification
1	(Romania) CSM București	6	4	0	2	185	171	+14	8	Main round
2	(Norway) Vipers Kristiansand	6	3	1	2	180	162	+18	7	Main round
3	(Hungary) FTC-Rail Cargo Hungaria	6	3	0	3	174	186	−12	6	Main round
4	(Germany) SG BBM Bietigheim	6	1	1	4	162	182	−20	3	EHF Cup

Source: EHF
Rules for classification: Tiebreakers

5 October 2018; 17:30	CSM București (Romania)	36–31	(Hungary) FTC-Rail Cargo Hungaria	Sala Polivalentă, Bucharest; Attendance: 4,500; Referees: Brunovský, Čanda (SVK)
5 October 2018; 17:30	Neagu 9	(18–13)	Háfra 6	Sala Polivalentă, Bucharest; Attendance: 4,500; Referees: Brunovský, Čanda (SVK)
5 October 2018; 17:30	3× (yellow card) 4× (suspension)	Report	3× (yellow card) 1× (suspension)	Sala Polivalentă, Bucharest; Attendance: 4,500; Referees: Brunovský, Čanda (SVK)

6 October 2018; 18:15	Vipers Kristiansand (Norway)	27–27	(Germany) SG BBM Bietigheim	Aquarama Kristiansand, Kristiansand; Attendance: 1,223; Referees: Christiansen, Hansen (DEN)
6 October 2018; 18:15	Sulland 6	(14–15)	Lauenroth 5	Aquarama Kristiansand, Kristiansand; Attendance: 1,223; Referees: Christiansen, Hansen (DEN)
6 October 2018; 18:15	4× (yellow card) 1× (suspension)	Report	2× (yellow card) 2× (suspension)	Aquarama Kristiansand, Kristiansand; Attendance: 1,223; Referees: Christiansen, Hansen (DEN)

14 October 2018; 14:30	FTC-Rail Cargo Hungaria (Hungary)	27–26	(Norway) Vipers Kristiansand	Érd Aréna, Érd; Attendance: 2,000; Referees: Bonaventura, Bonaventura (FRA)
14 October 2018; 14:30	Kovacsics 7	(17–14)	Reistad, Sulland 6	Érd Aréna, Érd; Attendance: 2,000; Referees: Bonaventura, Bonaventura (FRA)
14 October 2018; 14:30	2× (yellow card) 3× (suspension)	Report	4× (yellow card) 8× (suspension)	Érd Aréna, Érd; Attendance: 2,000; Referees: Bonaventura, Bonaventura (FRA)

14 October 2018; 18:00	SG BBM Bietigheim (Germany)	30–28	(Romania) CSM București	Arena Ludwigsburg, Ludwigsburg; Attendance: 2,041; Referees: Alpaidze, Berezkina (RUS)
14 October 2018; 18:00	Naidzinavicius 11	(16–12)	Neagu 10	Arena Ludwigsburg, Ludwigsburg; Attendance: 2,041; Referees: Alpaidze, Berezkina (RUS)
14 October 2018; 18:00	2× (yellow card) 2× (suspension)	Report	2× (yellow card) 3× (suspension)	Arena Ludwigsburg, Ludwigsburg; Attendance: 2,041; Referees: Alpaidze, Berezkina (RUS)

20 October 2018; 18:15	Vipers Kristiansand (Norway)	27–29	(Romania) CSM București	Aquarama Kristiansand, Kristiansand; Attendance: 1,985; Referees: Jurinović, Mrvica (CRO)
20 October 2018; 18:15	Sulland 8	(14–14)	Lekić 9	Aquarama Kristiansand, Kristiansand; Attendance: 1,985; Referees: Jurinović, Mrvica (CRO)
20 October 2018; 18:15	3× (yellow card) 2× (suspension)	Report	3× (yellow card) 4× (suspension)	Aquarama Kristiansand, Kristiansand; Attendance: 1,985; Referees: Jurinović, Mrvica (CRO)

21 October 2018; 17:00	SG BBM Bietigheim (Germany)	25–28	(Hungary) FTC-Rail Cargo Hungaria	Arena Ludwigsburg, Ludwigsburg; Attendance: 1,777; Referees: Covalciuc, Covalciuc (MDA)
21 October 2018; 17:00	Van der Heijden 5	(14–13)	Háfra 8	Arena Ludwigsburg, Ludwigsburg; Attendance: 1,777; Referees: Covalciuc, Covalciuc (MDA)
21 October 2018; 17:00	2× (yellow card) 3× (suspension)	Report	3× (yellow card) 3× (suspension)	Arena Ludwigsburg, Ludwigsburg; Attendance: 1,777; Referees: Covalciuc, Covalciuc (MDA)

4 November 2018; 14:30	FTC-Rail Cargo Hungaria (Hungary)	33–30	(Germany) SG BBM Bietigheim	Érd Aréna, Érd; Attendance: 2,000; Referees: Brkić, Jusufhodžić (AUT)
4 November 2018; 14:30	Kovacsics 15	(17–13)	Malestein 6	Érd Aréna, Érd; Attendance: 2,000; Referees: Brkić, Jusufhodžić (AUT)
4 November 2018; 14:30	3× (yellow card) 4× (suspension)	Report	3× (yellow card) 3× (suspension)	Érd Aréna, Érd; Attendance: 2,000; Referees: Brkić, Jusufhodžić (AUT)

4 November 2018; 17:30	CSM București (Romania)	26–31	(Norway) Vipers Kristiansand	Sala Polivalentă Dinamo, Bucharest; Attendance: 1,800; Referees: Brehmer, Skowronek (POL)
4 November 2018; 17:30	Neagu, Radičević 8	(11–16)	Aune 8	Sala Polivalentă Dinamo, Bucharest; Attendance: 1,800; Referees: Brehmer, Skowronek (POL)
4 November 2018; 17:30	2× (yellow card) 2× (suspension)	Report	2× (yellow card) 3× (suspension)	Sala Polivalentă Dinamo, Bucharest; Attendance: 1,800; Referees: Brehmer, Skowronek (POL)

11 November 2018; 14:30	FTC-Rail Cargo Hungaria (Hungary)	28–34	(Romania) CSM București	Érd Aréna, Érd; Attendance: 2,200; Referees: Christiansen, Hansen (DEN)
11 November 2018; 14:30	Háfra, Pena 6	(10–17)	Neagu 10	Érd Aréna, Érd; Attendance: 2,200; Referees: Christiansen, Hansen (DEN)
11 November 2018; 14:30	2× (yellow card) 1× (suspension)	Report	2× (yellow card) 5× (suspension)	Érd Aréna, Érd; Attendance: 2,200; Referees: Christiansen, Hansen (DEN)

11 November 2018; 17:00	SG BBM Bietigheim (Germany)	26–34	(Norway) Vipers Kristiansand	Arena Ludwigsburg, Ludwigsburg; Attendance: 1,914; Referees: Tzaferopoulos, Bethmann (GRE)
11 November 2018; 17:00	Visser 6	(12–16)	Yttereng 9	Arena Ludwigsburg, Ludwigsburg; Attendance: 1,914; Referees: Tzaferopoulos, Bethmann (GRE)
11 November 2018; 17:00	2× (yellow card) 1× (suspension)	Report	4× (yellow card) 2× (suspension)	Arena Ludwigsburg, Ludwigsburg; Attendance: 1,914; Referees: Tzaferopoulos, Bethmann (GRE)

17 November 2018; 15:30	Vipers Kristiansand (Norway)	35–27	(Hungary) FTC-Rail Cargo Hungaria	Aquarama Kristiansand, Kristiansand; Attendance: 2,024; Referees: Pandžić, Mošorinski (SRB)
17 November 2018; 15:30	Sulland 8	(18–14)	Háfra 8	Aquarama Kristiansand, Kristiansand; Attendance: 2,024; Referees: Pandžić, Mošorinski (SRB)
17 November 2018; 15:30	2× (yellow card) 3× (suspension)	Report	3× (yellow card) 4× (suspension)	Aquarama Kristiansand, Kristiansand; Attendance: 2,024; Referees: Pandžić, Mošorinski (SRB)

18 November 2018; 16:15	CSM București (Romania)	32–24	(Germany) SG BBM Bietigheim	Sala Polivalentă Dinamo, Bucharest; Attendance: 2,300; Referees: Barysas, Petrušis (LTU)
18 November 2018; 16:15	Lekić 6	(14–13)	Loerper 5	Sala Polivalentă Dinamo, Bucharest; Attendance: 2,300; Referees: Barysas, Petrušis (LTU)
18 November 2018; 16:15	2× (suspension)	Report	2× (yellow card) 6× (suspension)	Sala Polivalentă Dinamo, Bucharest; Attendance: 2,300; Referees: Barysas, Petrušis (LTU)
