= 2018–19 Women's EHF Champions League main round =

Handball tournament stage

The 2018–19 Women's EHF Champions League main round began on 25 January and was concluded on 10 March 2019. A total of twelve teams competed for eight places in the knockout stage of the 2018–19 Women's EHF Champions League.

== Qualified teams ==
Group	Winners	Runners-up	Third place
A	(France) Metz Handball	(Montenegro) ŽRK Budućnost	(Denmark) Odense Håndbold
B	(Russia) Rostov-Don	(Denmark) København Håndbold	(France) Brest Bretagne Handball
C	(Hungary) Győri Audi ETO KC	(Slovenia) RK Krim	(Germany) Thüringer HC
D	(Romania) CSM București	(Norway) Vipers Kristiansand	(Hungary) FTC-Rail Cargo Hungaria

== Format ==
In each group, teams played against each other in a double round-robin format, with home and away matches. After completion of the group stage matches, the top four teams advanced to the knockout stage. Points against teams from the same group were carried over.

== Tiebreakers ==
In the group stage, teams were ranked according to points (2 points for a win, 1 point for a draw, 0 points for a loss). After completion of the group stage, if two or more teams have scored the same number of points, the ranking was determined as follows:

1. Highest number of points in matches between the teams directly involved;
2. Superior goal difference in matches between the teams directly involved;
3. Highest number of goals scored in matches between the teams directly involved (or in the away match in case of a two-team tie);
4. Superior goal difference in all matches of the group;
5. Highest number of plus goals in all matches of the group;

If the ranking of one of these teams is determined, the above criteria are consecutively followed until the ranking of all teams is determined. If no ranking can be determined, a decision shall be obtained by EHF through drawing of lots.

== Groups ==
The matchdays were 25–27 January, 1–3 February, 8–10 February, 22–24 February, 1–3 March, 8–10 March 2018.

=== Group 1 ===
Pos	Team	Pld	W	D	L	GF	GA	GD	Pts	Qualification
1	(France) Metz Handball	10	7	1	2	299	242	+57	15 (Note: Metz Handball 55–43 Rostov-Don)	Quarterfinals
2	(Russia) Rostov-Don	10	7	1	2	261	241	+20	15	Quarterfinals
3	(Montenegro) ŽRK Budućnost	10	5	1	4	245	248	−3	11	Quarterfinals
4	(Denmark) Odense Håndbold	10	3	2	5	246	267	−21	8 (Note: Odense Håndbold 49–47 København Håndbold)	Quarterfinals
5	(Denmark) København Håndbold	10	3	2	5	271	280	−9	8	
6	(France) Brest Bretagne Handball	10	0	3	7	253	297	−44	3	

Source: EHF
Rules for classification: Tiebreakers
Notes:

26 January 2019; 14:30	Odense Håndbold (Denmark)	28–24	(France) Brest Bretagne Handball	Odense Sports Park, Odense; Attendance: 1,737; Referees: Brkic, Jusufhodzic (AUT)
26 January 2019; 14:30	Jørgensen 6	(14–10)	Gros 7	Odense Sports Park, Odense; Attendance: 1,737; Referees: Brkic, Jusufhodzic (AUT)
26 January 2019; 14:30	2× (yellow card) 3× (suspension)	Report	1× (yellow card) 5× (suspension)	Odense Sports Park, Odense; Attendance: 1,737; Referees: Brkic, Jusufhodzic (AUT)

26 January 2019; 17:30	Metz Handball (France)	29–25	(Russia) Rostov-Don	Arènes de Metz, Metz; Attendance: 4,352; Referees: Praštalo, Balvan (BIH)
26 January 2019; 17:30	Zaadi 7	(17–14)	Abbingh 7	Arènes de Metz, Metz; Attendance: 4,352; Referees: Praštalo, Balvan (BIH)
26 January 2019; 17:30	1× (yellow card) 3× (suspension)	Report	3× (yellow card) 3× (suspension)	Arènes de Metz, Metz; Attendance: 4,352; Referees: Praštalo, Balvan (BIH)

27 January 2019; 19:30	ŽRK Budućnost (Montenegro)	29–27	(Denmark) København Håndbold	Morača Sports Center, Podgorica; Attendance: 3,001; Referees: Opava, Válek (CZE)
27 January 2019; 19:30	Raičević 8	(15–12)	Nielsen 8	Morača Sports Center, Podgorica; Attendance: 3,001; Referees: Opava, Válek (CZE)
27 January 2019; 19:30	3× (yellow card) 4× (suspension)	Report	1× (yellow card) 4× (suspension)	Morača Sports Center, Podgorica; Attendance: 3,001; Referees: Opava, Válek (CZE)

2 February 2019; 14:00	Rostov-Don (Russia)	24–22	(Montenegro) ŽRK Budućnost	Rostov-on-Don Palace of Sports, Rostov-on-Don; Attendance: 3,300; Referees: Pech, Vagvölgyi (HUN)
2 February 2019; 14:00	Sen 8	(13–11)	Raičević 7	Rostov-on-Don Palace of Sports, Rostov-on-Don; Attendance: 3,300; Referees: Pech, Vagvölgyi (HUN)
2 February 2019; 14:00	2× (yellow card) 5× (suspension) 1× (red card)	Report	2× (yellow card) 11× (suspension) 1× (red card)	Rostov-on-Don Palace of Sports, Rostov-on-Don; Attendance: 3,300; Referees: Pech, Vagvölgyi (HUN)

2 February 2019; 17:30	Brest Bretagne Handball (France)	21–32	(France) Metz Handball	Brest Arena, Brest; Attendance: 3,555; Referees: Kijauskaitė, Žalienė (LTU)
2 February 2019; 17:30	Pineau 7	(9–16)	Zaadi 7	Brest Arena, Brest; Attendance: 3,555; Referees: Kijauskaitė, Žalienė (LTU)
2 February 2019; 17:30	3× (yellow card) 4× (suspension) 1× (red card)	Report	3× (yellow card) 4× (suspension)	Brest Arena, Brest; Attendance: 3,555; Referees: Kijauskaitė, Žalienė (LTU)

4 February 2019; 19:00	København Håndbold (Denmark)	24–24	(Denmark) Odense Håndbold	Trefor Arena, Brøndby; Attendance: 1,410; Referees: Brunovský, Čanda (SVK)
4 February 2019; 19:00	Dulfer 4	(12–9)	Cohrt 7	Trefor Arena, Brøndby; Attendance: 1,410; Referees: Brunovský, Čanda (SVK)
4 February 2019; 19:00	2× (yellow card) 1× (suspension)	Report	3× (yellow card) 5× (suspension)	Trefor Arena, Brøndby; Attendance: 1,410; Referees: Brunovský, Čanda (SVK)

10 February 2019; 15:00	Metz Handball (France)	36–24	(Denmark) København Håndbold	Arènes de Metz, Metz; Attendance: 4,500; Referees: Vranes, Wenninger (AUT)
10 February 2019; 15:00	Zaadi 7	(19–13)	Nielsen 5	Arènes de Metz, Metz; Attendance: 4,500; Referees: Vranes, Wenninger (AUT)
10 February 2019; 15:00	2× (yellow card) 4× (suspension)	Report	2× (yellow card) 6× (suspension)	Arènes de Metz, Metz; Attendance: 4,500; Referees: Vranes, Wenninger (AUT)

10 February 2019; 15:10	Odense Håndbold (Denmark)	26–30	(Russia) Rostov-Don	Odense Sports Park, Odense; Attendance: 2,236; Referees: Covalciuc, Covalciuc (MDA)
10 February 2019; 15:10	Tranborg 8	(13–17)	Managarova 6	Odense Sports Park, Odense; Attendance: 2,236; Referees: Covalciuc, Covalciuc (MDA)
10 February 2019; 15:10	3× (yellow card) 3× (suspension)	Report	2× (yellow card) 3× (suspension)	Odense Sports Park, Odense; Attendance: 2,236; Referees: Covalciuc, Covalciuc (MDA)

10 February 2019; 19:00	ŽRK Budućnost (Montenegro)	28–27	(France) Brest Bretagne Handball	Morača Sports Center, Podgorica; Attendance: 3,100; Referees: Năstase, Stancu (ROU)
10 February 2019; 19:00	Jauković 12	(15–12)	Tissier 7	Morača Sports Center, Podgorica; Attendance: 3,100; Referees: Năstase, Stancu (ROU)
10 February 2019; 19:00	2× (yellow card) 3× (suspension)	Report	1× (yellow card) 3× (suspension)	Morača Sports Center, Podgorica; Attendance: 3,100; Referees: Năstase, Stancu (ROU)

23 February 2019; 13:30	København Håndbold (Denmark)	31–20	(Montenegro) ŽRK Budućnost	Trefor Arena, Brøndby; Attendance: 1,208; Referees: Merz, Schiha (GER)
23 February 2019; 13:30	Blohm 7	(16–9)	K. Bulatović, Grbić 4	Trefor Arena, Brøndby; Attendance: 1,208; Referees: Merz, Schiha (GER)
23 February 2019; 13:30	2× (yellow card) 2× (suspension)	Report	2× (yellow card) 4× (suspension)	Trefor Arena, Brøndby; Attendance: 1,208; Referees: Merz, Schiha (GER)

23 February 2019; 14:30	Rostov-Don (Russia)	18–26	(France) Metz Handball	Rostov-on-Don Palace of Sports, Rostov-on-Don; Attendance: 3,500; Referees: Ilieva, Karbeska (MKD)
23 February 2019; 14:30	Abbingh, Borshchenko 5	(12–13)	Smits 6	Rostov-on-Don Palace of Sports, Rostov-on-Don; Attendance: 3,500; Referees: Ilieva, Karbeska (MKD)
23 February 2019; 14:30	3× (yellow card) 1× (suspension)	Report	3× (yellow card) 2× (suspension)	Rostov-on-Don Palace of Sports, Rostov-on-Don; Attendance: 3,500; Referees: Ilieva, Karbeska (MKD)

24 February 2019; 15:00	Brest Bretagne Handball (France)	24–29	(Denmark) Odense Håndbold	Brest Arena, Brest; Attendance: 3,425; Referees: Bennani, Bennani (SWE)
24 February 2019; 15:00	Gros 8	(13–13)	Heindahl, Tranborg 6	Brest Arena, Brest; Attendance: 3,425; Referees: Bennani, Bennani (SWE)
24 February 2019; 15:00	2× (yellow card) 1× (suspension)	Report	2× (yellow card) 4× (suspension)	Brest Arena, Brest; Attendance: 3,425; Referees: Bennani, Bennani (SWE)

2 March 2019; 14:30	Odense Håndbold (Denmark)	25–23	(Denmark) København Håndbold	Odense Sports Park, Odense; Attendance: 2,127; Referees: Kijauskaitė, Žalienė (LTU)
2 March 2019; 14:30	Østergaard 5	(13–11)	Dulfer 6	Odense Sports Park, Odense; Attendance: 2,127; Referees: Kijauskaitė, Žalienė (LTU)
2 March 2019; 14:30	2× (yellow card) 1× (suspension)	Report	3× (yellow card) 3× (suspension)	Odense Sports Park, Odense; Attendance: 2,127; Referees: Kijauskaitė, Žalienė (LTU)

3 March 2019; 15:00	Metz Handball (France)	39–26	(France) Brest Bretagne Handball	Arènes de Metz, Metz; Attendance: 4,500; Referees: Christidi, Papamattheou (GRE)
3 March 2019; 15:00	Houette 10	(17–13)	Gros, Toublanc 4	Arènes de Metz, Metz; Attendance: 4,500; Referees: Christidi, Papamattheou (GRE)
3 March 2019; 15:00	2× (yellow card) 2× (suspension)	Report	1× (yellow card) 6× (suspension)	Arènes de Metz, Metz; Attendance: 4,500; Referees: Christidi, Papamattheou (GRE)

3 March 2019; 19:00	ŽRK Budućnost (Montenegro)	20–23	(Russia) Rostov-Don	Morača Sports Center, Podgorica; Attendance: 2,612; Referees: Brkic, Jusufhodzic (AUT)
3 March 2019; 19:00	K. Bulatović 7	(9–11)	four players 3	Morača Sports Center, Podgorica; Attendance: 2,612; Referees: Brkic, Jusufhodzic (AUT)
3 March 2019; 19:00	3× (yellow card) 1× (suspension)	Report	4× (yellow card) 5× (suspension)	Morača Sports Center, Podgorica; Attendance: 2,612; Referees: Brkic, Jusufhodzic (AUT)

9 March 2019; 14:00	Rostov-Don (Russia)	25–19	(Denmark) Odense Håndbold	Rostov-on-Don Palace of Sports, Rostov-on-Don; Attendance: 3,500; Referees: Florescu, Stoia (ROU)
9 March 2019; 14:00	Sen 6	(14–10)	Bakkerud 9	Rostov-on-Don Palace of Sports, Rostov-on-Don; Attendance: 3,500; Referees: Florescu, Stoia (ROU)
9 March 2019; 14:00	2× (yellow card)	Report	3× (yellow card) 3× (suspension)	Rostov-on-Don Palace of Sports, Rostov-on-Don; Attendance: 3,500; Referees: Florescu, Stoia (ROU)

10 March 2019; 15:00	København Håndbold (Denmark)	36–33	(France) Metz Handball	Trefor Arena, Brøndby; Attendance: 1,275; Referees: Horváth, Marton (HUN)
10 March 2019; 15:00	Nielsen 6	(15–17)	Smits 8	Trefor Arena, Brøndby; Attendance: 1,275; Referees: Horváth, Marton (HUN)
10 March 2019; 15:00	1× (yellow card) 2× (suspension)	Report	2× (yellow card) 2× (suspension)	Trefor Arena, Brøndby; Attendance: 1,275; Referees: Horváth, Marton (HUN)

10 March 2019; 17:00	Brest Bretagne Handball (France)	22–22	(Montenegro) ŽRK Budućnost	Brest Arena, Brest; Attendance: 2,995; Referees: Brehmer, Skowronek (POL)
10 March 2019; 17:00	Gros 7	(13–13)	K. Bulatović 5	Brest Arena, Brest; Attendance: 2,995; Referees: Brehmer, Skowronek (POL)
10 March 2019; 17:00	3× (yellow card) 2× (suspension)	Report	3× (yellow card) 3× (suspension)	Brest Arena, Brest; Attendance: 2,995; Referees: Brehmer, Skowronek (POL)

=== Group 2 ===
Pos	Team	Pld	W	D	L	GF	GA	GD	Pts	Qualification
1	(Hungary) Győri Audi ETO KC	10	8	2	0	333	267	+66	18	Quarterfinals
2	(Norway) Vipers Kristiansand	10	6	0	4	288	265	+23	12 (Note: Vipers Kristiansand 61–54 FTC-Rail Cargo Hungaria)	Quarterfinals
3	(Hungary) FTC-Rail Cargo Hungaria	10	5	2	3	298	306	−8	12	Quarterfinals
4	(Romania) CSM București	10	5	1	4	292	282	+10	11	Quarterfinals
5	(Slovenia) RK Krim	10	2	1	7	243	281	−38	5	
6	(Germany) Thüringer HC	10	0	2	8	255	308	−53	2	

Source: EHF
Rules for classification: Tiebreakers
Notes:

26 January 2019; 15:00	Krim (Slovenia)	24–25	(Norway) Vipers Kristiansand	Kodeljevo Hall, Ljubljana; Attendance: 1,500; Referees: Panayides, Andreou (CYP)
26 January 2019; 15:00	Mavsar, Peredery 5	(8–10)	three players 5	Kodeljevo Hall, Ljubljana; Attendance: 1,500; Referees: Panayides, Andreou (CYP)
26 January 2019; 15:00	3× (yellow card) 2× (suspension)	Report	3× (yellow card) 3× (suspension)	Kodeljevo Hall, Ljubljana; Attendance: 1,500; Referees: Panayides, Andreou (CYP)

26 January 2019; 19:30	Győri Audi ETO KC (Hungary)	36–27	(Romania) CSM București	Audi Aréna, Győr; Attendance: 5,389; Referees: Nikolić, Stojković (SRB)
26 January 2019; 19:30	Pintea 9	(22–15)	Lekić 8	Audi Aréna, Győr; Attendance: 5,389; Referees: Nikolić, Stojković (SRB)
26 January 2019; 19:30	3× (yellow card) 3× (suspension)	Report	3× (yellow card) 5× (suspension)	Audi Aréna, Győr; Attendance: 5,389; Referees: Nikolić, Stojković (SRB)

27 January 2019; 14:00	Thüringer HC (Germany)	32–35	(Hungary) FTC-Rail Cargo Hungaria	Wiedigsburghalle, Nordhausen; Attendance: 1,500; Referees: Brehmer, Skowronek (POL)
27 January 2019; 14:00	Huber 9	(19–19)	Pena 14	Wiedigsburghalle, Nordhausen; Attendance: 1,500; Referees: Brehmer, Skowronek (POL)
27 January 2019; 14:00	3× (yellow card) 3× (suspension)	Report	2× (yellow card) 6× (suspension)	Wiedigsburghalle, Nordhausen; Attendance: 1,500; Referees: Brehmer, Skowronek (POL)

2 February 2019; 16:00	CSM București (Romania)	32–26	(Slovenia) Krim	Sala Polivalentă, Bucharest; Attendance: 4,862; Referees: Canbro, Kliko (SWE)
2 February 2019; 16:00	Radičević 10	(16–11)	Tsakalou 7	Sala Polivalentă, Bucharest; Attendance: 4,862; Referees: Canbro, Kliko (SWE)
2 February 2019; 16:00	2× (yellow card) 2× (suspension)	Report	2× (yellow card) 3× (suspension)	Sala Polivalentă, Bucharest; Attendance: 4,862; Referees: Canbro, Kliko (SWE)

2 February 2019; 17:30	FTC-Rail Cargo Hungaria (Hungary)	32–32	(Hungary) Győri Audi ETO KC	Érd Aréna, Érd; Attendance: 2,000; Referees: Alpaidze, Berezkina (RUS)
2 February 2019; 17:30	Klujber 7	(16–15)	Groot 8	Érd Aréna, Érd; Attendance: 2,000; Referees: Alpaidze, Berezkina (RUS)
2 February 2019; 17:30	3× (yellow card) 3× (suspension)	Report	3× (yellow card) 3× (suspension)	Érd Aréna, Érd; Attendance: 2,000; Referees: Alpaidze, Berezkina (RUS)

2 February 2019; 18:15	Vipers Kristiansand (Norway)	31–24	(Germany) Thüringer HC	Aquarama Kristiansand, Kristiansand; Attendance: 1,534; Referees: Sa, Sa (POR)
2 February 2019; 18:15	Kristiansen 10	(16–12)	Luzumová, Schmelzer 6	Aquarama Kristiansand, Kristiansand; Attendance: 1,534; Referees: Sa, Sa (POR)
2 February 2019; 18:15	4× (yellow card) 3× (suspension)	Report	3× (yellow card) 3× (suspension)	Aquarama Kristiansand, Kristiansand; Attendance: 1,534; Referees: Sa, Sa (POR)

9 February 2019; 15:00	Krim (Slovenia)	23–25	(Hungary) FTC-Rail Cargo Hungaria	Kodeljevo Hall, Ljubljana; Attendance: 1,457; Referees: Mata, López (ESP)
9 February 2019; 15:00	Gnabouyou 6	(10–10)	Klujber 9	Kodeljevo Hall, Ljubljana; Attendance: 1,457; Referees: Mata, López (ESP)
9 February 2019; 15:00	2× (yellow card) 4× (suspension)	Report	4× (yellow card) 6× (suspension)	Kodeljevo Hall, Ljubljana; Attendance: 1,457; Referees: Mata, López (ESP)

9 February 2019; 19:30	Győri Audi ETO KC (Hungary)	33–29	(Norway) Vipers Kristiansand	Audi Aréna, Győr; Attendance: 5,397; Referees: Christiansen, Hansen (DEN)
9 February 2019; 19:30	Hansen 8	(19–14)	Sulland 8	Audi Aréna, Győr; Attendance: 5,397; Referees: Christiansen, Hansen (DEN)
9 February 2019; 19:30	3× (yellow card) 3× (suspension)	Report	2× (yellow card) 2× (suspension)	Audi Aréna, Győr; Attendance: 5,397; Referees: Christiansen, Hansen (DEN)

10 February 2019; 14:00	Thüringer HC (Germany)	30–38	(Romania) CSM București	Wiedigsburghalle, Nordhausen; Attendance: 1,600; Referees: Brunner, Salah (SUI)
10 February 2019; 14:00	Luzumová 12	(12–17)	Radičević 13	Wiedigsburghalle, Nordhausen; Attendance: 1,600; Referees: Brunner, Salah (SUI)
10 February 2019; 14:00	2× (yellow card) 3× (suspension)	Report	2× (yellow card) 5× (suspension)	Wiedigsburghalle, Nordhausen; Attendance: 1,600; Referees: Brunner, Salah (SUI)

23 February 2019; 15:30	CSM București (Romania)	25–27	(Hungary) Győri Audi ETO KC	Sala Polivalentă, Bucharest; Attendance: 5,032; Referees: Bonaventura, Bonaventura (FRA)
23 February 2019; 15:30	Radičević 6	(10–14)	Groot 8	Sala Polivalentă, Bucharest; Attendance: 5,032; Referees: Bonaventura, Bonaventura (FRA)
23 February 2019; 15:30	3× (yellow card) 4× (suspension)	Report	4× (yellow card) 4× (suspension)	Sala Polivalentă, Bucharest; Attendance: 5,032; Referees: Bonaventura, Bonaventura (FRA)

23 February 2019; 18:15	Vipers Kristiansand (Norway)	29–21	(Slovenia) Krim	Aquarama Kristiansand, Kristiansand; Attendance: 1,610; Referees: Brehmer, Skowronek (POL)
23 February 2019; 18:15	Reistad 7	(14–14)	Stanko 8	Aquarama Kristiansand, Kristiansand; Attendance: 1,610; Referees: Brehmer, Skowronek (POL)
23 February 2019; 18:15	4× (yellow card) 3× (suspension)	Report	2× (yellow card) 2× (suspension)	Aquarama Kristiansand, Kristiansand; Attendance: 1,610; Referees: Brehmer, Skowronek (POL)

23 February 2019; 19:30	FTC-Rail Cargo Hungaria (Hungary)	30–29	(Germany) Thüringer HC	Érd Aréna, Érd; Attendance: 2,200; Referees: Tzaferopoulos, Bethmann (GRE)
23 February 2019; 19:30	Klujber 9	(17–12)	Luzumová, Stolle 6	Érd Aréna, Érd; Attendance: 2,200; Referees: Tzaferopoulos, Bethmann (GRE)
23 February 2019; 19:30	3× (yellow card) 2× (suspension)	Report	4× (yellow card) 6× (suspension)	Érd Aréna, Érd; Attendance: 2,200; Referees: Tzaferopoulos, Bethmann (GRE)

2 March 2019; 15:00	Krim (Slovenia)	23–22	(Romania) CSM București	Kodeljevo Hall, Ljubljana; Attendance: 823; Referees: Alpaidze, Berezkina (RUS)
2 March 2019; 15:00	Stanko 8	(12–11)	Curea 9	Kodeljevo Hall, Ljubljana; Attendance: 823; Referees: Alpaidze, Berezkina (RUS)
2 March 2019; 15:00	2× (yellow card) 5× (suspension)	Report	3× (yellow card) 6× (suspension) 1× (red card)	Kodeljevo Hall, Ljubljana; Attendance: 823; Referees: Alpaidze, Berezkina (RUS)

2 March 2019; 19:30	Győri Audi ETO KC (Hungary)	32–32	(Hungary) FTC-Rail Cargo Hungaria	Audi Aréna, Győr; Attendance: 5,475; Referees: Mitrevski, Todorovski (MKD)
2 March 2019; 19:30	Pintea 6	(15–13)	Pena 12	Audi Aréna, Győr; Attendance: 5,475; Referees: Mitrevski, Todorovski (MKD)
2 March 2019; 19:30	4× (yellow card) 1× (suspension)	Report	2× (yellow card) 3× (suspension)	Audi Aréna, Győr; Attendance: 5,475; Referees: Mitrevski, Todorovski (MKD)

3 March 2019; 14:00	Thüringer HC (Germany)	21–29	(Norway) Vipers Kristiansand	Wiedigsburghalle, Nordhausen; Attendance: 1,400; Referees: Antić, Jakovljević (SRB)
3 March 2019; 14:00	Bölk 6	(9–17)	Waade 6	Wiedigsburghalle, Nordhausen; Attendance: 1,400; Referees: Antić, Jakovljević (SRB)
3 March 2019; 14:00	1× (yellow card) 3× (suspension)	Report	2× (yellow card) 2× (suspension)	Wiedigsburghalle, Nordhausen; Attendance: 1,400; Referees: Antić, Jakovljević (SRB)

8 March 2019; 17:00	CSM București (Romania)	23–23	(Germany) Thüringer HC	Sala Polivalentă, Bucharest; Attendance: 3,468; Referees: Christiansen, Hansen (DEN)
8 March 2019; 17:00	Radičević 8	(14–8)	Stolle 6	Sala Polivalentă, Bucharest; Attendance: 3,468; Referees: Christiansen, Hansen (DEN)
8 March 2019; 17:00	2× (yellow card) 3× (suspension)	Report	2× (yellow card) 4× (suspension)	Sala Polivalentă, Bucharest; Attendance: 3,468; Referees: Christiansen, Hansen (DEN)

9 March 2019; 18:15	Vipers Kristiansand (Norway)	26–33	(Hungary) Győri Audi ETO KC	Aquarama Kristiansand, Kristiansand; Attendance: 2,200; Referees: Covalciuc, Covalciuc (MDA)
9 March 2019; 18:15	Waade 6	(17–17)	Oftedal 7	Aquarama Kristiansand, Kristiansand; Attendance: 2,200; Referees: Covalciuc, Covalciuc (MDA)
9 March 2019; 18:15	2× (yellow card) 3× (suspension)	Report	1× (yellow card) 4× (suspension)	Aquarama Kristiansand, Kristiansand; Attendance: 2,200; Referees: Covalciuc, Covalciuc (MDA)

10 March 2019; 14:30	FTC-Rail Cargo Hungaria (Hungary)	31–27	(Slovenia) Krim	Érd Aréna, Érd; Attendance: 2,200; Referees: Vranes, Wenninger (AUT)
10 March 2019; 14:30	Klujber 9	(16–11)	Mavsar 8	Érd Aréna, Érd; Attendance: 2,200; Referees: Vranes, Wenninger (AUT)
10 March 2019; 14:30	3× (yellow card) 5× (suspension)	Report	2× (yellow card) 5× (suspension)	Érd Aréna, Érd; Attendance: 2,200; Referees: Vranes, Wenninger (AUT)
