= 2018–19 Women's EHF Champions League knockout stage =

This article describes the knockout stage of the 2018–19 Women's EHF Champions League.

== Qualified teams ==
The top four placed teams from each of the two main round groups advanced to the knockout stage.

Group	First place	Second place	Third place	Fourth place
1	(France) Metz Handball	(Russia) Rostov-Don	(Montenegro) ŽRK Budućnost	(Denmark) Odense Håndbold
2	(Hungary) Győri Audi ETO KC	(Norway) Vipers Kristiansand	(Hungary) FTC-Rail Cargo Hungaria	(Romania) CSM București

== Format ==
The first-placed team of each group faced the fourth-placed team, and the second-placed team played against the third-placed team from the other group. After that a draw was held to determine the pairings for the final four.

== Quarterfinals ==
=== Overviews ===
Team 1	Agg.	Team 2	1st leg	2nd leg
CSM București (Romania)	48–54	(France) Metz Handball	26–31	22–23
Odense Håndbold (Denmark)	49–62	(Hungary) Győri Audi ETO KC	28–29	21–33
FTC-Rail Cargo Hungaria (Hungary)	48–62	(Russia) Rostov-Don	26–29	22–33
ŽRK Budućnost (Montenegro)	37–49	(Norway) Vipers Kristiansand	19–24	18–25

=== Matches ===
5 April 2019; 18:00	CSM București (Romania)	26–31	(France) Metz Handball	Sala Polivalentă, Bucharest; Attendance: 2,300; Referees: Vranes, Wenninger (AUT)
5 April 2019; 18:00	Radičević 10	(11–14)	Smits 6	Sala Polivalentă, Bucharest; Attendance: 2,300; Referees: Vranes, Wenninger (AUT)
5 April 2019; 18:00	3× (yellow card) 5× (suspension)	Report	2× (yellow card) 3× (suspension)	Sala Polivalentă, Bucharest; Attendance: 2,300; Referees: Vranes, Wenninger (AUT)

13 April 2019; 20:00	Metz Handball (France)	23–22	(Romania) CSM București	Arènes de Metz, Metz; Attendance: 4,500; Referees: Pandžić, Mosorinski (SRB)
13 April 2019; 20:00	Nocandy 6	(11–9)	Lekić 5	Arènes de Metz, Metz; Attendance: 4,500; Referees: Pandžić, Mosorinski (SRB)
13 April 2019; 20:00	2× (yellow card) 3× (suspension)	Report	2× (yellow card) 3× (suspension)	Arènes de Metz, Metz; Attendance: 4,500; Referees: Pandžić, Mosorinski (SRB)

Metz Handball won 54–48 on aggregate.

7 April 2019; 16:50	Odense Håndbold (Denmark)	28–29	(Hungary) Győri Audi ETO KC	Odense Sports Park, Odense; Attendance: 2,236; Referees: Jurinović, Mrvica (CRO)
7 April 2019; 16:50	Bakkerud 11	(13–18)	Oftedal 8	Odense Sports Park, Odense; Attendance: 2,236; Referees: Jurinović, Mrvica (CRO)
7 April 2019; 16:50	3× (yellow card) 3× (suspension)	Report	2× (yellow card) 2× (suspension)	Odense Sports Park, Odense; Attendance: 2,236; Referees: Jurinović, Mrvica (CRO)

13 April 2019; 17:30	Győri Audi ETO KC (Hungary)	33–21	(Denmark) Odense Håndbold	Audi Aréna, Győr; Attendance: 5,500; Referees: Vešović, Mitrović (MNE)
13 April 2019; 17:30	Amorim 7	(18–10)	Offendal 5	Audi Aréna, Győr; Attendance: 5,500; Referees: Vešović, Mitrović (MNE)
13 April 2019; 17:30	3× (yellow card) 3× (suspension)	Report	3× (yellow card) 1× (suspension)	Audi Aréna, Győr; Attendance: 5,500; Referees: Vešović, Mitrović (MNE)

Győri ETO KC won 62–49 on aggregate.

7 April 2019; 14:30	FTC-Rail Cargo Hungaria (Hungary)	26–29	(Russia) Rostov-Don	Érd Aréna, Érd; Attendance: 2,200; Referees: Năstase, Stancu (ROU)
7 April 2019; 14:30	Háfra, Klujber 7	(13–14)	Managarova 7	Érd Aréna, Érd; Attendance: 2,200; Referees: Năstase, Stancu (ROU)
7 April 2019; 14:30	4× (yellow card) 5× (suspension)	Report	4× (yellow card) 7× (suspension)	Érd Aréna, Érd; Attendance: 2,200; Referees: Năstase, Stancu (ROU)

13 April 2019; 15:00	Rostov-Don (Russia)	33–22	(Hungary) FTC-Rail Cargo Hungaria	Rostov-on-Don Palace of Sports, Rostov-on-Don; Attendance: 3,500; Referees: Mandák, Rudinský (SVK)
13 April 2019; 15:00	Abbingh 7	(15–9)	Háfra 7	Rostov-on-Don Palace of Sports, Rostov-on-Don; Attendance: 3,500; Referees: Mandák, Rudinský (SVK)
13 April 2019; 15:00	3× (yellow card) 2× (suspension)	Report	3× (yellow card) 2× (suspension)	Rostov-on-Don Palace of Sports, Rostov-on-Don; Attendance: 3,500; Referees: Mandák, Rudinský (SVK)

Rostov-Don won 62–48 on aggregate.

7 April 2019; 19:00	ŽRK Budućnost (Montenegro)	19–24	(Norway) Vipers Kristiansand	Morača Sports Center, Podgorica; Attendance: 2,856; Referees: Marín, García (ESP)
7 April 2019; 19:00	Jauković 5	(8–10)	Reistad 6	Morača Sports Center, Podgorica; Attendance: 2,856; Referees: Marín, García (ESP)
7 April 2019; 19:00	2× (yellow card) 4× (suspension)	Report	3× (yellow card) 4× (suspension) 1× (red card)	Morača Sports Center, Podgorica; Attendance: 2,856; Referees: Marín, García (ESP)

13 April 2019; 18:15	Vipers Kristiansand (Norway)	25–18	(Montenegro) ŽRK Budućnost	Aquarama Kristiansand, Kristiansand; Attendance: 2,150; Referees: Florescu, Stoia (ROU)
13 April 2019; 18:15	Sulland 6	(11–8)	Grbić, Laslo 4	Aquarama Kristiansand, Kristiansand; Attendance: 2,150; Referees: Florescu, Stoia (ROU)
13 April 2019; 18:15	3× (yellow card) 2× (suspension)	Report	3× (yellow card) 6× (suspension)	Aquarama Kristiansand, Kristiansand; Attendance: 2,150; Referees: Florescu, Stoia (ROU)

Vipers Kristiansand won 49–37 on aggregate.

== Final four ==
The final four was held at the László Papp Budapest Sports Arena in Budapest, Hungary on 11 and 12 May 2019. The draw took place on 16 April 2019.

=== Bracket ===
Semifinals
11 May
(Norway) Vipers Kristiansand	22
(Hungary) Győri Audi ETO KC	31
11 May
(France) Metz Handball	25
(Russia) Rostov-Don	27

Final
12 May
(Hungary) Győri Audi ETO KC	25
(Russia) Rostov-Don	24
Third place
12 May
(Norway) Vipers Kristiansand	31
(France) Metz Handball	30

=== Semifinals ===
11 May 2019; 15:15	Vipers Kristiansand (Norway)	22–31	(Hungary) Győri Audi ETO KC	László Papp Budapest Sports Arena, Budapest; Attendance: 12,000; Referees: Alpaidze, Berezkina (RUS)
11 May 2019; 15:15	Arntzen 5	(8–18)	Brattset 8	László Papp Budapest Sports Arena, Budapest; Attendance: 12,000; Referees: Alpaidze, Berezkina (RUS)
11 May 2019; 15:15	3× (yellow card) 5× (suspension)	Report	2× (yellow card) 3× (suspension)	László Papp Budapest Sports Arena, Budapest; Attendance: 12,000; Referees: Alpaidze, Berezkina (RUS)

11 May 2019; 18:00	Metz Handball (France)	25–27	(Russia) Rostov-Don	László Papp Budapest Sports Arena, Budapest; Attendance: 12,000; Referees: Erdoğan, Özdeniz (TUR)
11 May 2019; 18:00	Zaadi 9	(8–15)	Vyakhireva 7	László Papp Budapest Sports Arena, Budapest; Attendance: 12,000; Referees: Erdoğan, Özdeniz (TUR)
11 May 2019; 18:00	2× (yellow card) 2× (suspension)	Report	2× (yellow card) 5× (suspension) 1× (red card)	László Papp Budapest Sports Arena, Budapest; Attendance: 12,000; Referees: Erdoğan, Özdeniz (TUR)

=== Third place game ===
12 May 2019; 15:15	Metz Handball (France)	30–31	(Norway) Vipers Kristiansand	László Papp Budapest Sports Arena, Budapest; Attendance: 12,000; Referees: Merz, Schilha (GER)
12 May 2019; 15:15	Zaadi 6	(16–15)	Sulland 10	László Papp Budapest Sports Arena, Budapest; Attendance: 12,000; Referees: Merz, Schilha (GER)
12 May 2019; 15:15	2× (yellow card)	Report	3× (yellow card) 4× (suspension)	László Papp Budapest Sports Arena, Budapest; Attendance: 12,000; Referees: Merz, Schilha (GER)

=== Final ===
12 May 2019; 18:00	Rostov-Don (Russia)	24–25	(Hungary) Győri Audi ETO KC	László Papp Budapest Sports Arena, Budapest; Attendance: 12,000; Referees: Brehmer, Skowronek (POL)
12 May 2019; 18:00	Abbingh 7	(11–15)	Amorim 7	László Papp Budapest Sports Arena, Budapest; Attendance: 12,000; Referees: Brehmer, Skowronek (POL)
12 May 2019; 18:00	4× (yellow card) 6× (suspension)	Report	3× (yellow card) 6× (suspension) 2× (red card)	László Papp Budapest Sports Arena, Budapest; Attendance: 12,000; Referees: Brehmer, Skowronek (POL)
