= Jana Krause =

German handball player (born 1987)

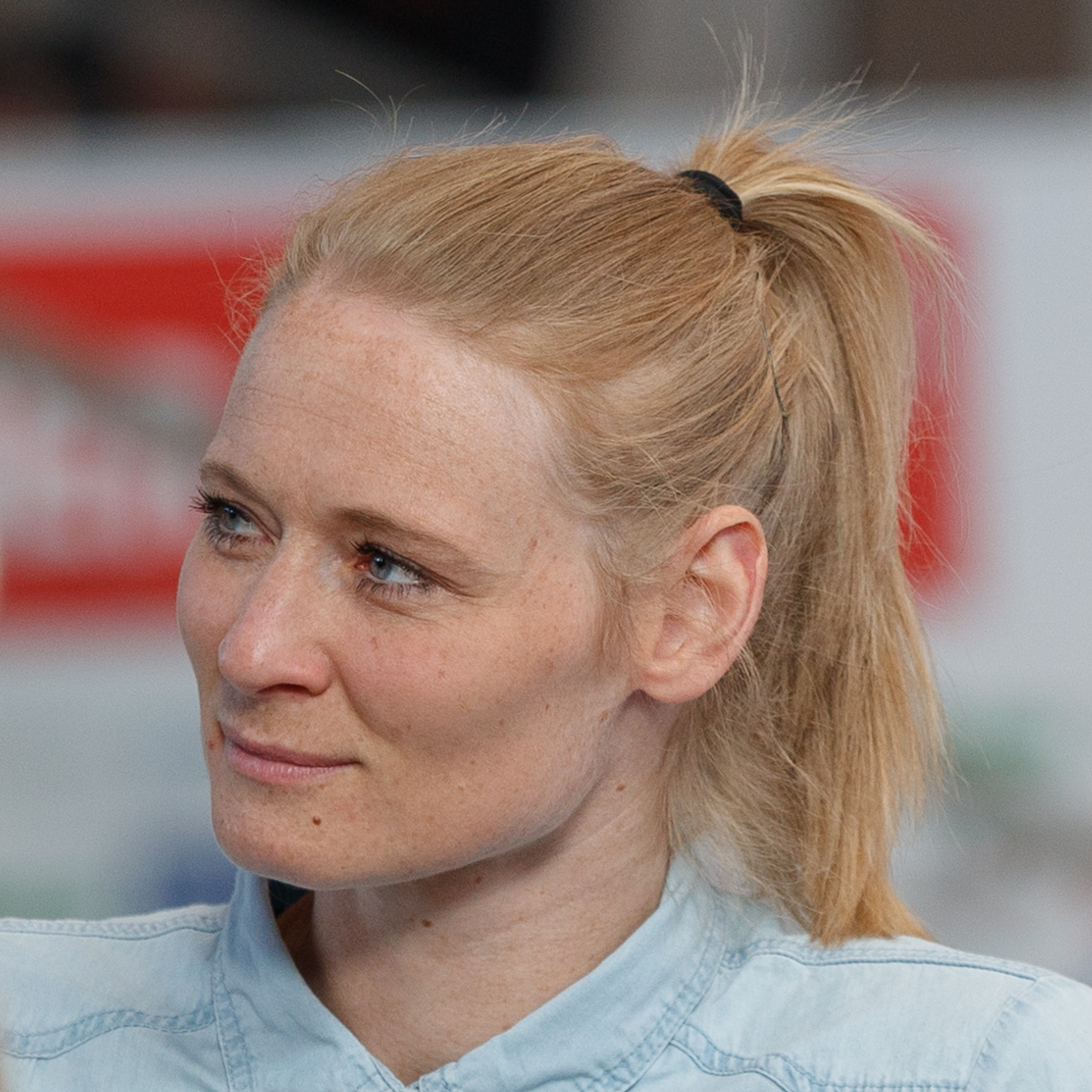

Personal information
- Nationality: German
- Born: 10 June 1987 (age 39) Munich, Germany
- Height: 1.88 m (6 ft 2 in)

Sport
- Sport: Handball
- Position: Goalkeeper
- Current club: Thüringer HC
- Number: 1

Senior clubs
- Years: Team
- –2006: HC Leipzig
- 2006–2009: 1. FC Nürnberg
- 2009–2013: Buxtehuder SV
- 2013–2020: Thüringer HC
National team
| Years | Team | Apps | (Gls) |
| 2007–? | Germany | 39 | (0) |

Jana Krause (born 10 June 1987) is a German handball goalkeeper. She plays for the club Thüringer HC, and on the German national team. She represented Germany at the 2013 World Women's Handball Championship in Serbia.

== Honours ==
- Bundesliga:
  - Winner: 2007, 2008
- EHF Challenge Cup:
  - Winner: 2010
