= Alexandra Mazzucco =

German handball player (born 1993)

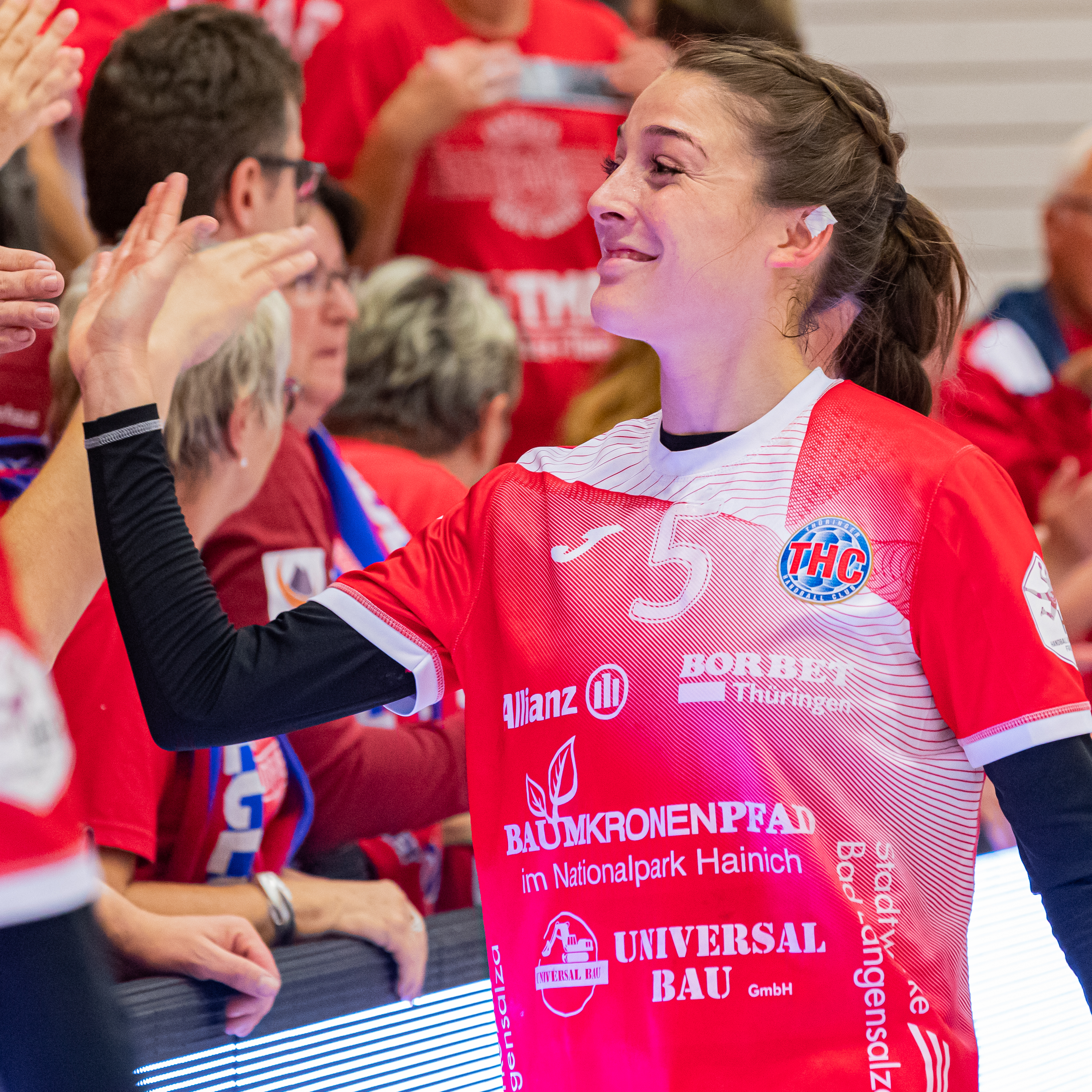

Personal information
- Nationality: German
- Born: 29 January 1993 (age 33) Lauf an der Pegnitz, Germany
- Height: 1.75 m (5 ft 9 in)

Sport
- Sport: Handball
- Position: Right wing
- Current club: SV Union Halle-Neustadt
- Number: 5

Youth career
- Years: Team
- 2004–2009: SSG Metten
- 2009–2011: ESV Regensburg
- 2011–2012: HC Leipzig

Senior clubs
- Years: Team
- 2009–2011: ESV Regensburg
- 2011–2017: HC Leipzig
- 2017–2020: Thüringer HC
- 2020–: SV Union Halle-Neustadt
National team
Years	Team	Apps	(Gls)
2015–	Germany	19	(35)
- Updated on 29 August 2020

Alexandra Mazzucco (born 29 January 1993) is a German handball player for Thüringer HC, and the German national team.
