= Anouk van de Wiel =

Dutch handball player (born 1992)

Personal information
- Full name: Anouk van de Wiel
- Nationality: Dutch
- Born: 10 July 1992 (age 34) Venlo, Netherlands
- Height: 1.88 m (6 ft 2 in)

Sport
- Sport: Handball
- Position: Right back
- Current club: Retired

Senior clubs
- Years: Team
- 1998-2009: Loreal Venlo
- 2009-2010: AAC Arnhem
- 2010-2012: Venus Nieuwegein
- 2012-2014: Borussia Dortmund
- 2014-2015: Frisch Auf Göppingen
- 2015-2017: Thüringer HC
- 2017-2018: Bayer 04 Leverkusen
- 2018-2019: Molde Elite
- 2019-2020: SG 09 Kirchhof
National team
Years	Team	Apps	(Gls)
2014	Netherlands	2	(1)

Anouk van de Wiel (born 10 July 1992) is a Dutch former handball player.

She retired in 2020.
