= Anika Niederwieser =

Italian handball player (born 1992)

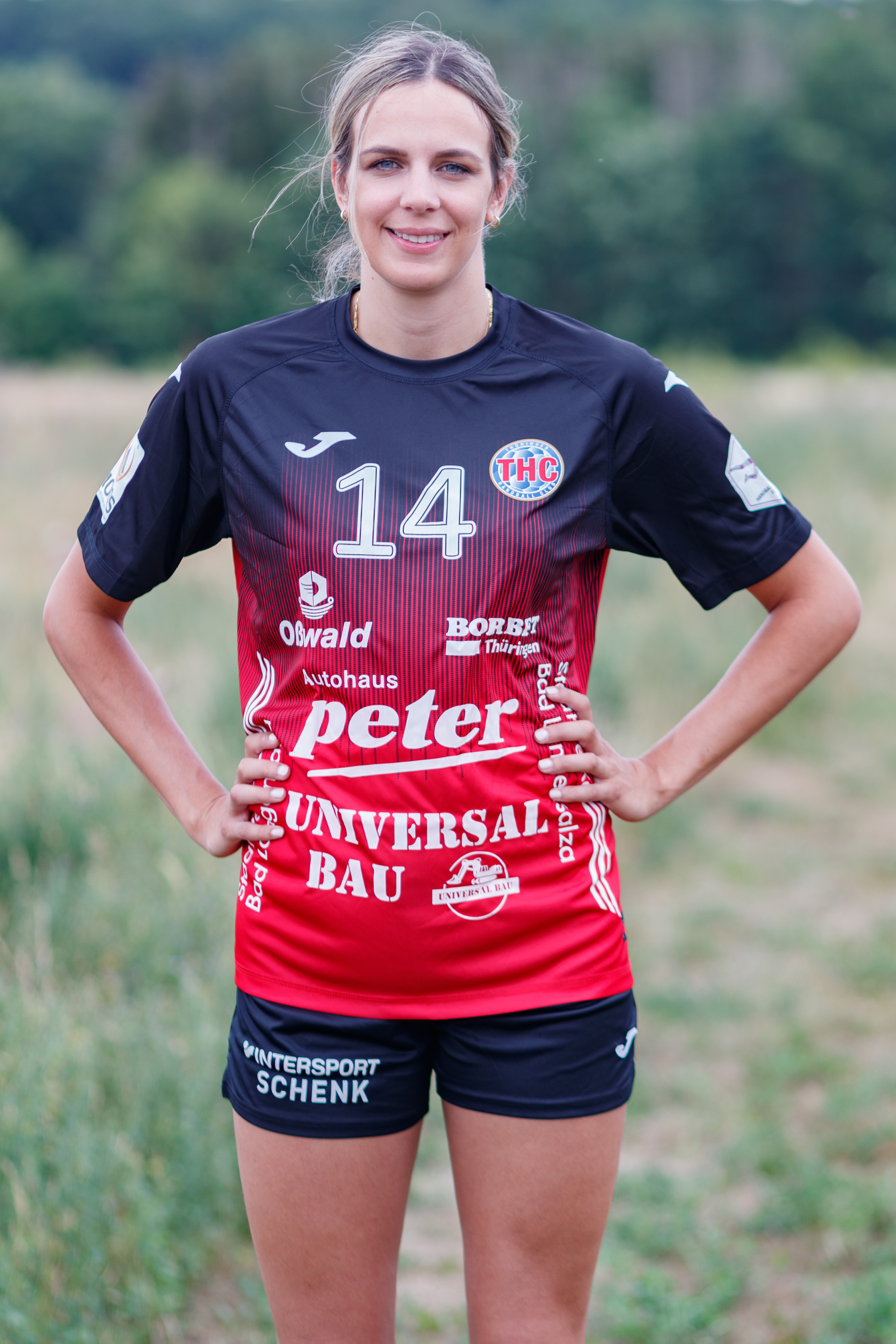

Personal information
- Nationality: Italian
- Born: 28 February 1992 (age 34) Brixen, Italy
- Height: 1.85 m (6 ft 1 in)

Sport
- Sport: Handball
- Position: Left Back

Senior clubs
- Years: Team
- –2011: SSV Brixen
- 2011–2016: Esercito Figh Futura Roma
- 2016–2018: Thüringer HC
- 2018–2021: TuS Metzingen
- 2021–2026: Thüringer HC
National team
Years	Team	Apps	(Gls)
2009–	Italy	61	(396)

Anika Niederwieser (born 28 February 1992) is an Italian handballer who plays for the Italy national team.

She won the Bundesliga in 2018, the DHB Supercup in 2016 and the bronze medal at the Beach Handball European Championships in 2011 and 2015 respectively. Her brother and father were handball players as well.

== Achievements ==
- Bundesliga:
  - Winner: 2018
- DHB-Supercup:
  - Winner: 2016

== Individual awards ==
- Best Defender of the Beach Handball World Championships: 2014
