= Kerstin Wohlbold =

German handball player (born 1984)

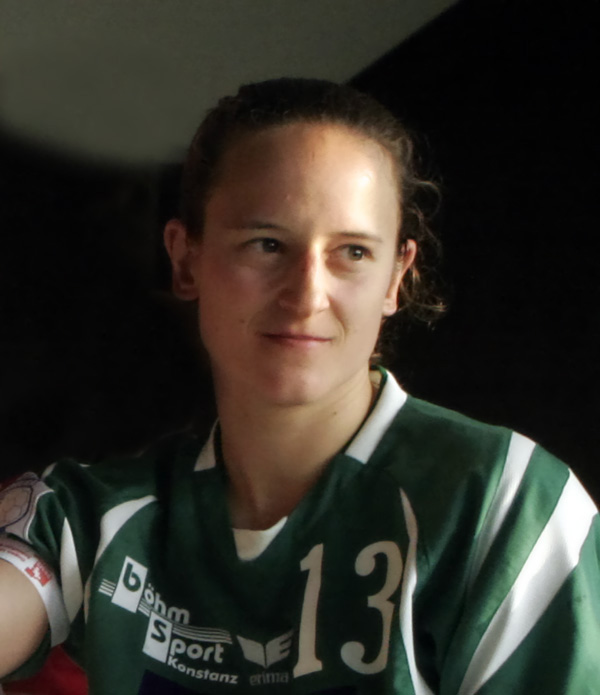
- Wohlbold in April 2006 in Bensheim

Personal information
- Nationality: German
- Born: 11 January 1984 (age 42) Friedrichshafen, West Germany
- Height: 1.70 m (5 ft 7 in)

Sport
- Sport: Handball
- Position: Centre back
- Current club: Thüringer HC
- Number: 31

Youth career
- Years: Team
- 1988–1996: FC Kluftern
- 1996–2000: TSV Fischbach

Senior clubs
- Years: Team
- 2000–2002: SSV Dorbirn Schoren
- 2002–2006: SV Allensbach
- 2006–2009: 1. FC Nürnberg
- 2009–2010: HSG Blomberg-Lippe
- 2010–2019: Thüringer HC
National team
Years	Team	Apps	(Gls)
2011–2017	Germany	81	(144)

Kerstin Wohlbold (born 11 January 1984) is a German former handballer who retired in 2017 while playing for Thüringer HC.

== Achievements ==
- Bundesliga:
  - Winner: 2007, 2008, 2011
- German Cup:
  - Winner: 2011
