= Anna Sen =

Russian handball player (born 1990)

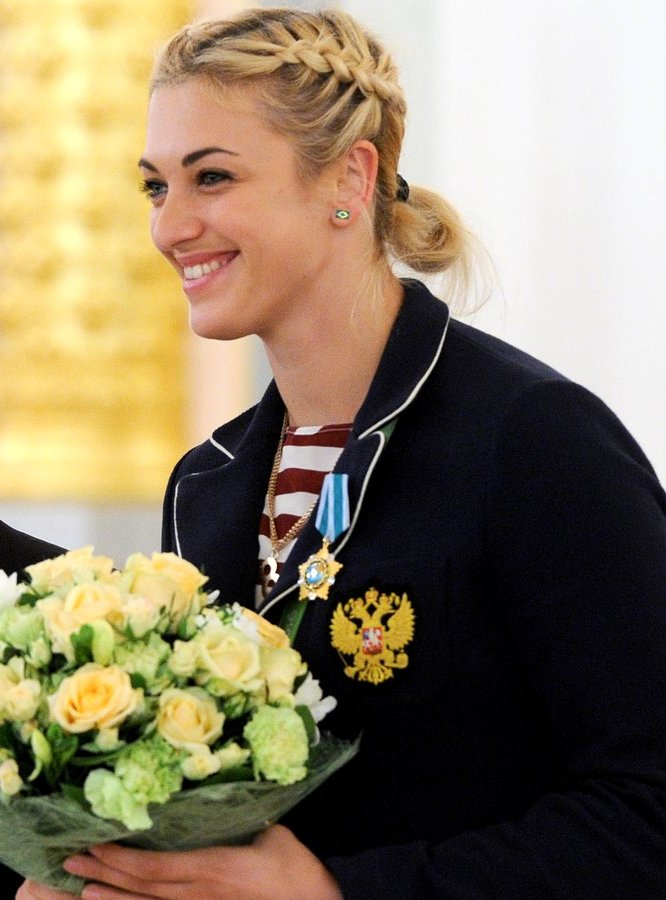
- Sen after receiving a Russian state award

Personal information
- Full name: Anna Sergeyevna Sen
- Nationality: Russian
- Born: 3 December 1990 (age 35) Krasnodar, Russian SFSR, Soviet Union
- Height: 1.86 m (6 ft 1 in)

Sport
- Sport: Handball
- Position: Left back
- Current club: Rostov-Don
- Number: 8

Senior clubs
- Years: Team
- 2004–2010: HC Kuban Krasnodar
- 2010–2011: Zvezda Zvenigorod
- 2011–2014: Rostov-Don
- 2014–2015: Győri ETO KC
- 2015–: Rostov-Don
National team
| Years | Team | Apps | (Gls) |
| 2008– | Russia | 158 | (387) |
Medal record
Representing ROC
Olympic Games
| Silver medal – second place | 2020 Tokyo | Team |
Representing Russia
Olympic Games
| Gold medal – first place | 2016 Rio de Janeiro | Team |
World Championship
| Bronze medal – third place | 2019 Japan | Team |
European Championship
| Silver medal – second place | 2018 France | Team |
World Youth Championship
| Gold medal – first place | 2008 Slovakia | Team |
European Junior Championship
| Bronze medal – third place | 2009 Hungary | Team |
- Updated on 1 July 2021

Anna Sergeyevna Sen (Russian: Анна Сергеевна Сень, IPA: [ˈanːə ˈsʲenʲ]; born 3 December 1990) is a Russian handball player for Rostov-Don and the Russian national team.

== Career ==
Sen played until 2010 for HC Kuban Krasnodar, where she joined league rivals Zvezda Zvenigorod. A year later she joined Rostov-Don. In 2014-15 she moved to Hungarian handball and joined Győri ETO KC. She played a single season for the club, where she won the Hungarian cup.

In 2015 she returned to Rostov-Don. Here she won the 2017 EHF European League and the 2017, 2018, 2019, 2020, and 2022 Russian championship.

== National team ==
Sen has played over 150 matches for the Russian national team.

With the Russian youth national team she won the 2008 Youth World Championship. A year later she came third in the 2009 Junior European Championship, and was top scorer at the tournament. She also won silver medals at the 2010 U20 World Championship.

With the senior team she won gold medals at the 2016 Olympics. Two years later she won silver medals at the 2018 European Championship, losing to France in the final.

At the 2019 World Championship she won bronze medals, beating Norway in the third place play-off. She scored 35 goals during the tournament.

A year later she won silver medals at the 2020 Olympics, once again losing to France. Sen scored 8 goals during the tournament.

== Achievements ==
- Olympic Games:
  - Gold Medalist: 2016
  - Silver Medalist: 2020
- European Championship:
  - Silver Medalist: 2018
- Russian Super League
  - Gold Medalist: 2016/17, 2017/18, 2018/19, 2019/20, 2021/22
- Russian Super Cup:
  - Bronze Medalist: 2017, 2018, 2019
- EHF Champions League:
  - Finalist: 2018/2019
  - Fourth place: 2017/2018
- EHF Cup:
  - Gold Medalist: 2017
- European Junior Championship:
  - Bronze Medalist: 2009
- Hungarian Cup:
  - Winner: 2015
