= Elin Hallagård =

Swedish handball player (born 1989)

Personal information
- Nationality: Swedish
- Born: 4 January 1989 (age 37) Gothenburg, Sweden
- Height: 1.80 m (5 ft 11 in)

Sport
- Sport: Handball
- Position: Centre back
- Number: 13

Senior clubs
- Years: Team
- 2007–2008: Frederikshavn FOX Team Nord
- 2008–2009: Bjurslätt/Torslanda HK
- 2009–2012: BK Heid
- 2012–2019: IK Sävehof
- 2019–2020: BK Heid
- 2021–2022: Önnereds HK
National team
| Years | Team | Apps | (Gls) |
| 2011–2018 | Sweden | 9 | (6) |

Elin Hallagård (born 4 January 1989) is a former Swedish female handball player for IK Sävehof and the Swedish national team.

== Achievements ==
- SHE:
  - Winner: 2013, 2014, 2015, 2016, 2018 and 2019
