= Josefine Hanfland =

Austrian handballer (born 1996)

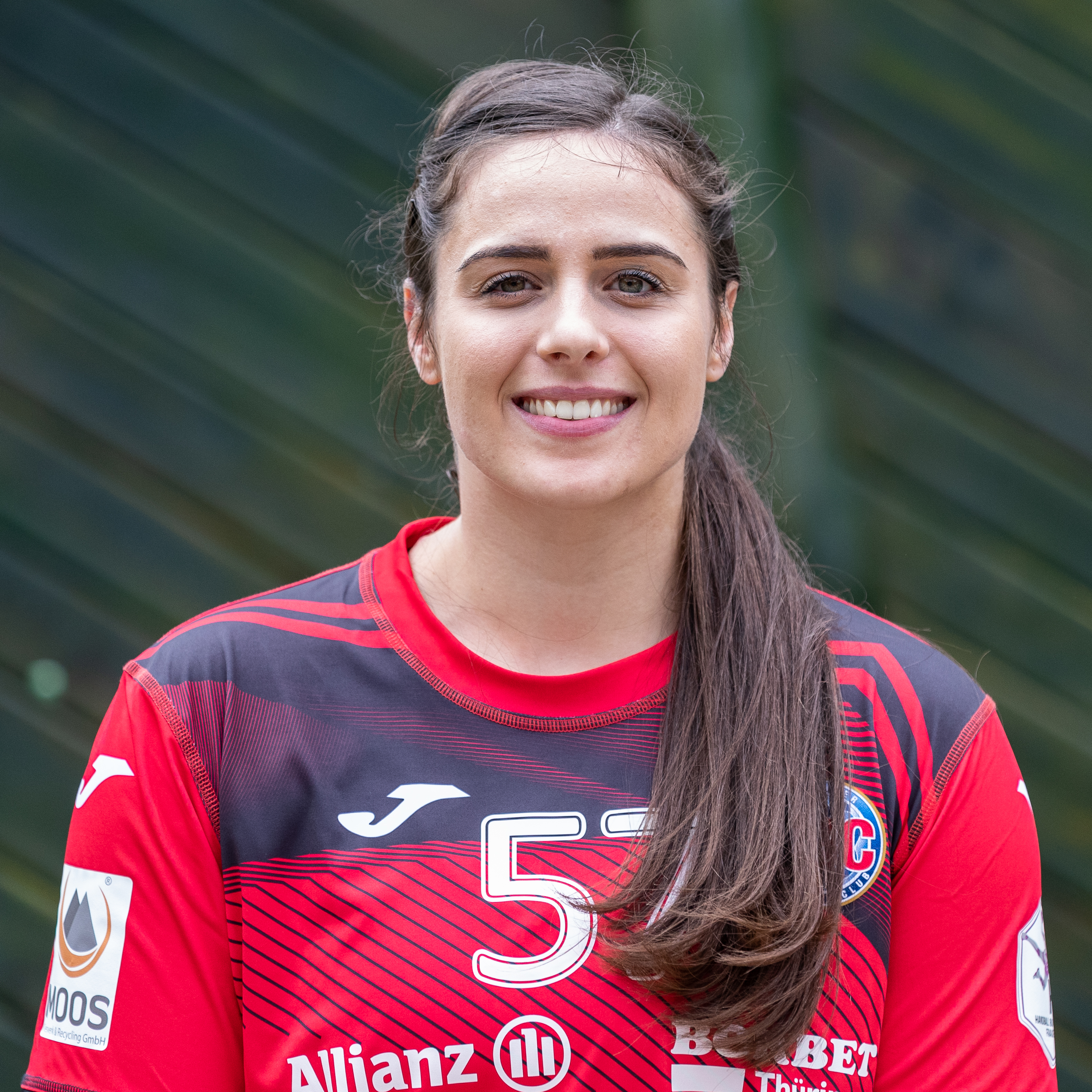

Personal information
- Nationality: Austrian
- Born: 19 February 1996 (age 30) Vienna, Austria
- Height: 1.80 m (5 ft 11 in)

Sport
- Sport: Handball
- Position: Line player
- Current club: Thüringer HC
- Number: 57

Youth career
- Years: Team
- –2015: Hypo Niederösterreich

Senior clubs
- Years: Team
- 2015–2017: HSG Blomberg-Lippe
- 2017–: Thüringer HC
National team
| Years | Team | Apps | (Gls) |
| 2019– | Austria | 67 | (170) |
- Updated on 6 November 2024

Josefine Hanfland (née Huber; born 19 February 1996) is an Austrian handballer for Thüringer HC and the Austrian national team.

She represented Austria at the 2021 World Women's Handball Championship, placing 16th.
