= Marion Maubon =

French handball player (born 1989)

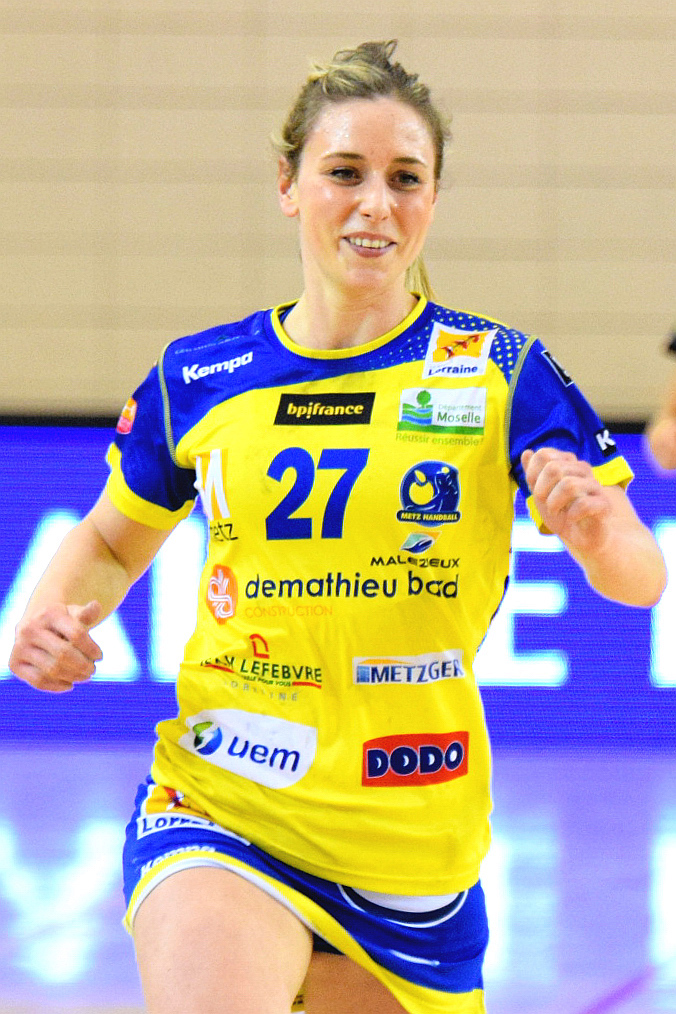

Personal information
- Full name: Marion Maubon
- Nationality: French
- Born: 27 July 1989 (age 37) Bordeaux, France
- Height: 1.65 m (5 ft 5 in)

Sport
- Sport: Handball
- Position: Left Wing
- Current club: Nantes Atlantique Handball
- Number: 27

Senior clubs
- Years: Team
- 2015-2020: Metz Handball
- 2020-: Nantes Atlantique Handball

Marion Maubon (born 27 July 1989) is a French female handball player who plays for Metz Handball.

== International honours ==
- Challenge Cup:
  - Winner: 2015
