= 2018–19 Women's EHF Champions League =

Women's EHF Champions League
- 2018–19

Tournament information
- Sport: Handball
- Dates: 7 September 2018–12 May 2019
- Teams: 16 (group stage); 8 (qualification)
- Website: ehfcl.com

Final positions
- Champions: (Hungary) Győri Audi ETO KC
- Runner-up: (Russia) Rostov-Don

Tournament statistics
- Matches played: 96
- Goals scored: 5229 (54.47 per match)
- Attendance: 289,808 (3,019 per match)
- Top scorer(s): (Norway) Linn Jørum Sulland (89 goals)

The 2018–19 Women's EHF Champions League was the 26th edition of the Women's EHF Champions League, the competition for top women's clubs of Europe, organized and supervised by the European Handball Federation.

Győri Audi ETO KC defended their title by defeating Rostov-Don 25–24 in the final, to win their fifth overall and third straight title.

== Competition format ==
16 teams participated in the competition, divided in four groups who played in a round robin, home and away format. The top three teams in each group qualified for the main round.

Main round

The 12 qualified teams were divided in two groups who played in a round robin, home and away format. The points and the goal difference gained against the qualified teams in the first round were carried over. The top four teams in each group qualified for the quarterfinals.

Knockout stage

After the quarterfinals, the culmination of the season, the Women's EHF Final four, continued in its existing format, with the four top teams from the competition competing for the title.

== Team allocation ==
14 teams were directly qualified for the group stage.

Group stage
(Denmark) København Håndbold	(Denmark) Odense Håndbold	(France) Brest Bretagne Handball	(France) Metz Handball
(Germany) Thüringer HC	(Hungary) FTC-Rail Cargo Hungaria	(Hungary) Győri Audi ETO KC	(Montenegro) ŽRK Budućnost
(Norway) Larvik HK	(Norway) Vipers Kristiansand	(Romania) CSM București	(Russia) Rostov-Don
(Slovenia) RK Krim	(Sweden) IK Sävehof		
Qualification tournaments
(Croatia) Podravka Koprivnica	(Germany) SG BBM Bietigheim	(Italy) Jomi Salerno	(Poland) MKS Lublin
(Romania) SCM Craiova	(Serbia) ŽORK Jagodina	(Spain) BM Bera Bera	(Turkey) Muratpaşa BSK

== Round and draw dates ==
Phase	Draw date
Qualification tournaments	27 June 2018
Group stage	29 June 2018
Knockout stage	29 June 2018
Final Four (Budapest)	16 April 2019

== Qualification stage ==
The draw was held on 27 June 2018. The two winners of the qualification tournaments advanced to the group stage. The second and third placed teams were translate to the third round of EHF Cup; the fourth places entered in the second round.

=== Qualification tournament 1 ===
Semifinals
8 September
(Germany) SG BBM Bietigheim	33
(Spain) BM Bera Bera	27
8 September
(Poland) MKS Lublin	28
(Italy) Jomi Salerno	17

Final
9 September
(Germany) SG BBM Bietigheim	34
(Poland) MKS Lublin	19
Third place
9 September
(Spain) BM Bera Bera	40
(Italy) Jomi Salerno	20

=== Qualification tournament 2 ===
Semifinals
8 September
(Romania) SCM Craiova	31
(Serbia) ŽORK Jagodina	18
8 September
(Croatia) Podravka Koprivnica	35
(Turkey) Muratpaşa BSK	22

Final
9 September
(Romania) SCM Craiova	21
(Croatia) Podravka Koprivnica	22
Third place
9 September
(Serbia) ŽORK Jagodina	26
(Turkey) Muratpaşa BSK	24

== Group stage ==
The draw was held on 29 June 2018. In each group, teams play against each other in a double round-robin format, with home and away matches.

Tiebreakers
In the group stage, teams are ranked according to points (2 points for a win, 1 point for a draw, 0 points for a loss). After completion of the group stage, if two or more teams have scored the same number of points, the ranking will be determined as follows:
1. Highest number of points in matches between the teams directly involved;
2. Superior goal difference in matches between the teams directly involved;
3. Highest number of goals scored in matches between the teams directly involved (or in the away match in case of a two-team tie);
4. Superior goal difference in all matches of the group;
5. Highest number of plus goals in all matches of the group;

If the ranking of one of these teams is determined, the above criteria are consecutively followed until the ranking of all teams is determined. If no ranking can be determined, a decision shall be obtained by EHF through drawing of lots.

During the group stage, only criteria 4–5 apply to determine the provisional ranking of teams.

=== Group A ===
Pos	Team	Pld	W	D	L	GF	GA	GD	Pts	Qualification	MET	BUD	ODE	LAR
1	(France) Metz Handball	6	4	1	1	166	133	+33	9	Main round	—	25–24	41–26	31–20
2	(Montenegro) ŽRK Budućnost	6	4	0	2	152	142	+10	8	Main round	23–19	—	31–28	26–25
3	(Denmark) Odense Håndbold	6	2	1	3	155	165	−10	5	Main round	19–19	22–26	—	27–23
4	(Norway) Larvik HK	6	1	0	5	137	170	−33	2	EHF Cup	21–31	23–22	25–33	—

Source: EHF

=== Group B ===
Pos	Team	Pld	W	D	L	GF	GA	GD	Pts	Qualification	ROS	KOB	BRE	SÄV
1	(Russia) Rostov-Don	6	5	1	0	178	146	+32	11	Main round	—	30–25	30–24	30–21
2	(Denmark) København Håndbold	6	3	1	2	175	157	+18	7	Main round	21–27	—	32–28	33–22
3	(France) Brest Bretagne Handball	6	2	2	2	182	172	+10	6	Main round	29–29	28–28	—	34–26
4	(Sweden) IK Sävehof	6	0	0	6	144	204	−60	0	EHF Cup	26–32	22–36	27–39	—

Source: EHF

=== Group C ===
Pos	Team	Pld	W	D	L	GF	GA	GD	Pts	Qualification	GYO	KRI	THÜ	KOP
1	(Hungary) Győri Audi ETO KC	6	6	0	0	210	140	+70	12	Main round	—	39–23	31–28	37–17
2	(Slovenia) RK Krim	6	2	2	2	153	164	−11	6	Main round	23–32	—	27–20	27–20
3	(Germany) Thüringer HC	6	1	1	4	153	173	−20	3 (Note: Thüringer HC 57–51 Podravka Koprivnica)	Main round	22–38	26–26	—	26–28
4	(Croatia) Podravka Koprivnica	6	1	1	4	142	181	−39	3	EHF Cup	27–33	27–27	23–31	—

Source: EHF

=== Group D ===
Pos	Team	Pld	W	D	L	GF	GA	GD	Pts	Qualification	BUC	KRI	FER	BIE
1	(Romania) CSM București	6	4	0	2	185	171	+14	8	Main round	—	26–31	36–31	32–24
2	(Norway) Vipers Kristiansand	6	3	1	2	180	162	+18	7	Main round	27–29	—	35–27	27–27
3	(Hungary) FTC-Rail Cargo Hungaria	6	3	0	3	174	186	−12	6	Main round	28–34	27–26	—	33–30
4	(Germany) SG BBM Bietigheim	6	1	1	4	162	182	−20	3	EHF Cup	30–28	26–34	25–28	—

Source: EHF

== Main round ==
In each group, teams played against each other in a double round-robin format, with home and away matches. Points against teams from the same group are carried over.

=== Group 1 ===
Pos	Team	Pld	W	D	L	GF	GA	GD	Pts	Qualification	MET	ROS	BUD	ODE	KOB	BRE
1	(France) Metz Handball	10	7	1	2	299	242	+57	15 (Note: Metz Handball 55–43 Rostov-Don)	Quarterfinals	—	29–25	25–24	41–26	36–24	39–26
2	(Russia) Rostov-Don	10	7	1	2	261	241	+20	15	Quarterfinals	18–26	—	24–22	25–19	30–25	30–24
3	(Montenegro) ŽRK Budućnost	10	5	1	4	245	248	−3	11	Quarterfinals	23–19	20–23	—	31–28	29–27	28–27
4	(Denmark) Odense Håndbold	10	3	2	5	246	267	−21	8 (Note: Odense Håndbold 49–47 København Håndbold)	Quarterfinals	19–19	26–30	22–26	—	25–23	28–24
5	(Denmark) København Håndbold	10	3	2	5	271	280	−9	8		36–33	21–27	31–20	24–24	—	32–28
6	(France) Brest Bretagne Handball	10	0	3	7	253	297	−44	3		21–32	29–29	22–22	24–29	28–28	—

Source: EHF

=== Group 2 ===
Pos	Team	Pld	W	D	L	GF	GA	GD	Pts	Qualification	GYO	VIP	FER	BUC	KRI	THÜ
1	(Hungary) Győri Audi ETO KC	10	8	2	0	333	267	+66	18	Quarterfinals	—	33–29	32–32	36–27	39–23	31–28
2	(Norway) Vipers Kristiansand	10	6	0	4	288	265	+23	12 (Note: Vipers Kristiansand 61–54 FTC-Rail Cargo Hungaria)	Quarterfinals	26–33	—	35–27	27–29	29–21	31–24
3	(Hungary) FTC-Rail Cargo Hungaria	10	5	2	3	298	306	−8	12	Quarterfinals	32–32	27–26	—	28–34	31–27	30–29
4	(Romania) CSM București	10	5	1	4	292	282	+10	11	Quarterfinals	25–27	26–31	36–31	—	32–26	23–23
5	(Slovenia) RK Krim	10	2	1	7	243	281	−38	5		23–32	24–25	23–25	23–22	—	27–20
6	(Germany) Thüringer HC	10	0	2	8	255	308	−53	2		22–38	21–29	32–35	30–38	26–26	—

Source: EHF

== Knockout stage ==
The top four placed teams from each of the two main round groups advanced to the knockout stage.

=== Quarterfinals ===
Team 1	Agg.	Team 2	1st leg	2nd leg
CSM București (Romania)	48–54	(France) Metz Handball	26–31	22–23
Odense Håndbold (Denmark)	49–62	(Hungary) Győri Audi ETO KC	28–29	21–33
FTC-Rail Cargo Hungaria (Hungary)	48–62	(Russia) Rostov-Don	26–29	22–33
ŽRK Budućnost (Montenegro)	37–49	(Norway) Vipers Kristiansand	19–24	18–25

=== Final four ===
Semifinals
11 May
(Norway) Vipers Kristiansand	22
(Hungary) Győri Audi ETO KC	31
11 May
(France) Metz Handball	25
(Russia) Rostov-Don	27

Final
12 May
(Hungary) Győri Audi ETO KC	25
(Russia) Rostov-Don	24
Third place
12 May
(Norway) Vipers Kristiansand	31
(France) Metz Handball	30

==== Final ====
12 May 2019; 18:00	Rostov-Don (Russia)	24–25	(Hungary) Győri Audi ETO KC	László Papp Budapest Sports Arena, Budapest; Attendance: 12,000; Referees: Brehmer, Skowronek (POL)
12 May 2019; 18:00	Abbingh 7	(11–15)	Amorim 7	László Papp Budapest Sports Arena, Budapest; Attendance: 12,000; Referees: Brehmer, Skowronek (POL)
12 May 2019; 18:00	4× (yellow card) 6× (suspension)	Report	3× (yellow card) 6× (suspension) 2× (red card)	László Papp Budapest Sports Arena, Budapest; Attendance: 12,000; Referees: Brehmer, Skowronek (POL)

== Awards and statistics ==
=== All-Star Team ===
The all-star team and awards were announced on 10 May 2019.

- Goalkeeper: Katrine Lunde (NOR) (Vipers Kristiansand)
- Right wing: Jovanka Radičević (MNE) (CSM București)
- Right back: Anna Vyakhireva (RUS) (Rostov-Don)
- Centre back: Stine Bredal Oftedal (NOR) (Győri Audi ETO KC)
- Left back: Anne Mette Hansen (DEN) (Győri Audi ETO KC)
- Left wing: Manon Houette (FRA) (Metz Handball)
- Pivot: Crina Pintea (ROU) (Győri Audi ETO KC)

=== Other awards ===
- MVP of the Final Four: Kari Aalvik Grimsbø (NOR) (Győri Audi ETO KC)
- Best coach: Emmanuel Mayonnade (FRA) (Metz Handball)
- Best young player: Noémi Háfra (HUN) (FTC-Rail Cargo Hungaria)
- Best defence player: Eduarda Amorim (BRA) (Győri Audi ETO KC)

== Top goalscorers ==
Rank	Player	Club	Goals
1	(Norway) Linn Jørum Sulland	(Norway) Vipers Kristiansand	89
2	(Hungary) Noémi Háfra	(Hungary) FTC-Rail Cargo Hungaria	80
2	(Montenegro) Jovanka Radičević	(Romania) CSM București	80
4	(Slovenia) Ana Gros	(France) Brest Bretagne Handball	76
5	(Serbia) Andrea Lekić	(Romania) CSM București	73
5	(Netherlands) Nycke Groot	(Hungary) Győri Audi ETO KC	73
7	(Czech Republic) Iveta Luzumová	(Germany) Thüringer HC	71
7	(Norway) Henny Reistad	(Norway) Vipers Kristiansand	71
7	(France) Grâce Zaadi	(France) Metz Handball	71
10	(Spain) Nerea Pena	(Hungary) FTC-Rail Cargo Hungaria	69
