= Noémi Háfra =

Hungarian handball player (born 1998)

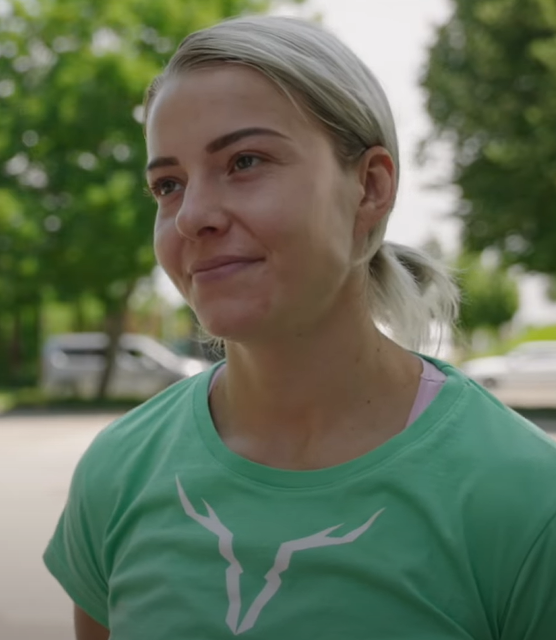

Personal information
- Nationality: Hungarian
- Born: 5 October 1998 (age 28) Cegléd, Hungary
- Height: 1.79 m (5 ft 10 in)

Sport
- Sport: Handball
- Position: Left back
- Current club: Mosonmagyaróvári KC SE
- Number: 45

Youth career
- Years: Team
- 2010–2013: Gyömrői VSK

Senior clubs
- Years: Team
- 2014–2021: Ferencvárosi TC
- 2016–2017: → MTK Budapest (loan)
- 2021–2024: Győri ETO KC
- 2022–2023: → Odense Håndbold (loan)
- 2023: → ŽRK Budućnost Podgorica (loan)
- 2023–2024: → SG BBM Bietigheim (loan)
- 2024: HB Ludwigsburg
- 2024–2025: Váci NKSE
- 2025–: Mosonmagyaróvári KC SE
National team
Years	Team	Apps	(Gls)
2017–	Hungary	78	(204)
Medal record
Junior World Championship
Gold medal – first place	2018 Hungary
Youth European Championship
Bronze medal – third place	2015 Macedonia
- Updated on 25 April 2022

Noémi Háfra (born 5 October 1998) is a Hungarian handballer for Mosonmagyaróvári KC SE and the Hungarian national team.

In September 2018, she was included by EHF in a list of the twenty best young handballers to watch for the future.

She participated in the 2020 Summer Olympics and finished 7th.

== Achievements ==
National team

- IHF Women's Junior World Championship:
  - Winner: 2018
- Youth European Championship:
  - Bronze Medalist: 2015

Domestic competitions

- Nemzeti Bajnokság I:
  - Winner: 2015, 2021, 2022, 2023

European competitions

- EHF Champions League:
  - Winner: 2024
  - Finalist: 2022

== Individual awards ==
- Hungarian Junior Handballer of the Year: 2017, 2018
- All-Star Left Back of the Junior World Championship: 2018
- All-Star Left Back of the European Championship: 2018
- All-Star Team - Best Young Player of the EHF Champions League: 2019, 2020
- Handball-planet Young World Female Handball Player: 2018–2019
