= Tamara Mavsar =

Slovenian handball player

Personal information
- Nationality: Slovenian
- Born: 1 April 1991 (age 35) Ljubljana, SFR Yugoslavia
- Height: 1.73 m (5 ft 8 in)

Sport
- Sport: Handball
- Position: Left wing
- Current club: Siófok KC
- Number: 8

Senior clubs
- Years: Team
- 2008–2016: RK Krim
- 2016–2017: ŽRK Vardar
- 2017–2020: RK Krim
- 2022–2023: Siófok KC
- 2023–: RK Krim
National team
Years	Team	Apps	(Gls)
–	Slovenia	109	(395)
Medal record
Women's handball
Representing Slovenia
Mediterranean Games
Silver medal – second place	2013 Mersin	Team
Bronze medal – third place	2018 Tarragona	Team
- Updated on 28 August 2024

Tamara Mavsar (born 1 April 1991) is a Slovenian handballer for Siófok KC and the Slovenian women's national team.

She competed for Slovenia at the 2024 Summer Olympics.

== Achievements ==
- Slovenian First League of Handball:
  - Winner: 2009, 2010, 2011, 2012, 2013, 2014
- Slovenian Cup:
  - Winner: 2009, 2010, 2011, 2012, 2013, 2014
- EHF Champions League:
  - Finalist: 2017
  - Semifinalist: 2013
