= Alicia Stolle =

German handball player (born 1996)

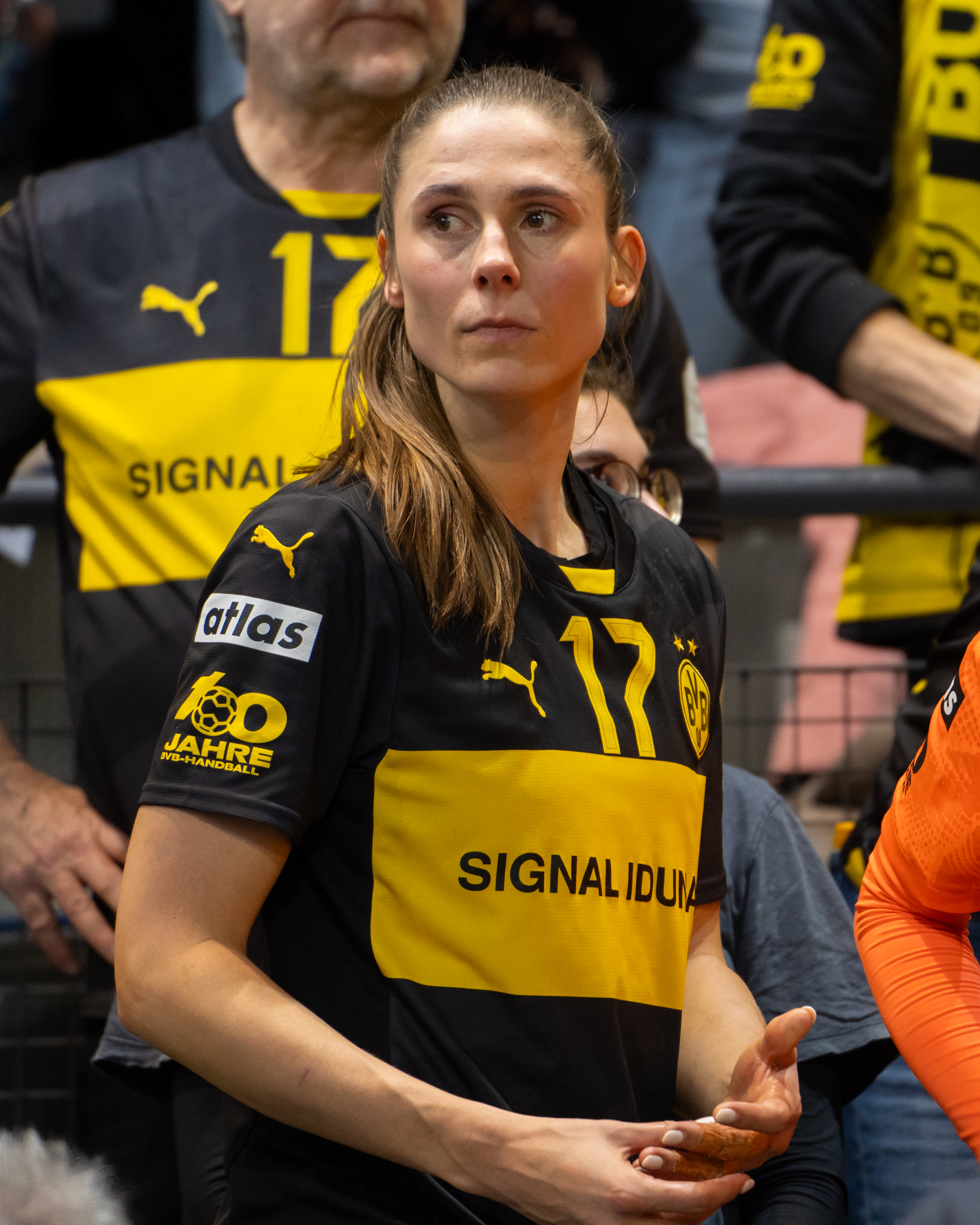

Personal information
- Nationality: German
- Born: 17 June 1996 (age 30) Ahlen, Germany
- Height: 1.82 m (6 ft 0 in)

Sport
- Sport: Handball
- Position: Right back
- Current club: Borussia Dortmund
- Number: 17

Senior clubs
- Years: Team
- –2011: Ahlener SG
- 2011–2014: Borussia Dortmund
- 2014–2018: HSG Blomberg-Lippe
- 2018–2020: Thüringer HC
- 2020–2023: Ferencvárosi TC
- 2023–: Borussia Dortmund
National team
| Years | Team | Apps | (Gls) |
| 2016– | Germany | 73 | (146) |
- Updated on 21 july 2023

Alicia Stolle (born 17 June 1996) is a German female handball player for Borussia Dortmund and the German national team.

She was part of the team at the 2016 European Women's Handball Championship.

== Awards ==
- EHF Champions League:
  - Silver: 2023
- Nemzeti Bajnokság:
  - Gold: 2021
- Magyar Kupa:
  - Gold: 2022, 2023

== Individual awards ==
- All-Star Right Back of the European Championship: 2018
