= Thüringer HC =

German handball club

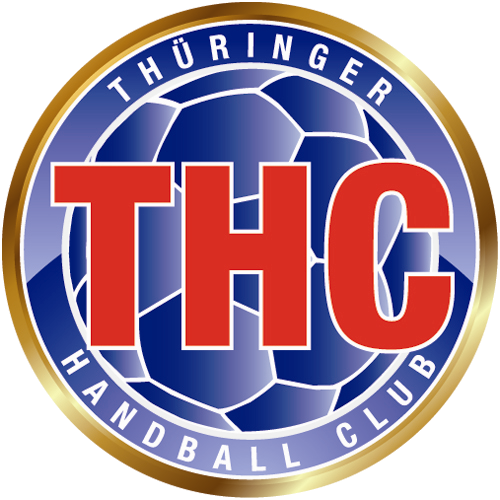
- Full name: Thüringer Handball Club Erfurt-Bad Langensalza e. V
- Short name: Thüringer HC
- Founded: 2000
- Arena: Wiedigsburghalle, Nordhausen
- Capacity: 2,018
- President: Karsten Döring
- Head coach: (Romania) Herbert Müller
- League: Bundesliga
- 2025–26: 3rd
Home	Away

Location of Thüringer HC

Thüringer Handball Club Erfurt-Bad Langensalza e. V is a German professional women's handball team from the Thuringian cities of Erfurt, Bad Langensalza and Nordhausen. The club has its seat in Erfurt and plays the home matches in the Salza-Halle in Bad Langensalza and the Wiedigsburghalle in Nordhausen. They compete in the Handball-Bundesliga Frauen, the top division in Germany.

The team won the European League title in 2025, which marks the club's first European trophy.

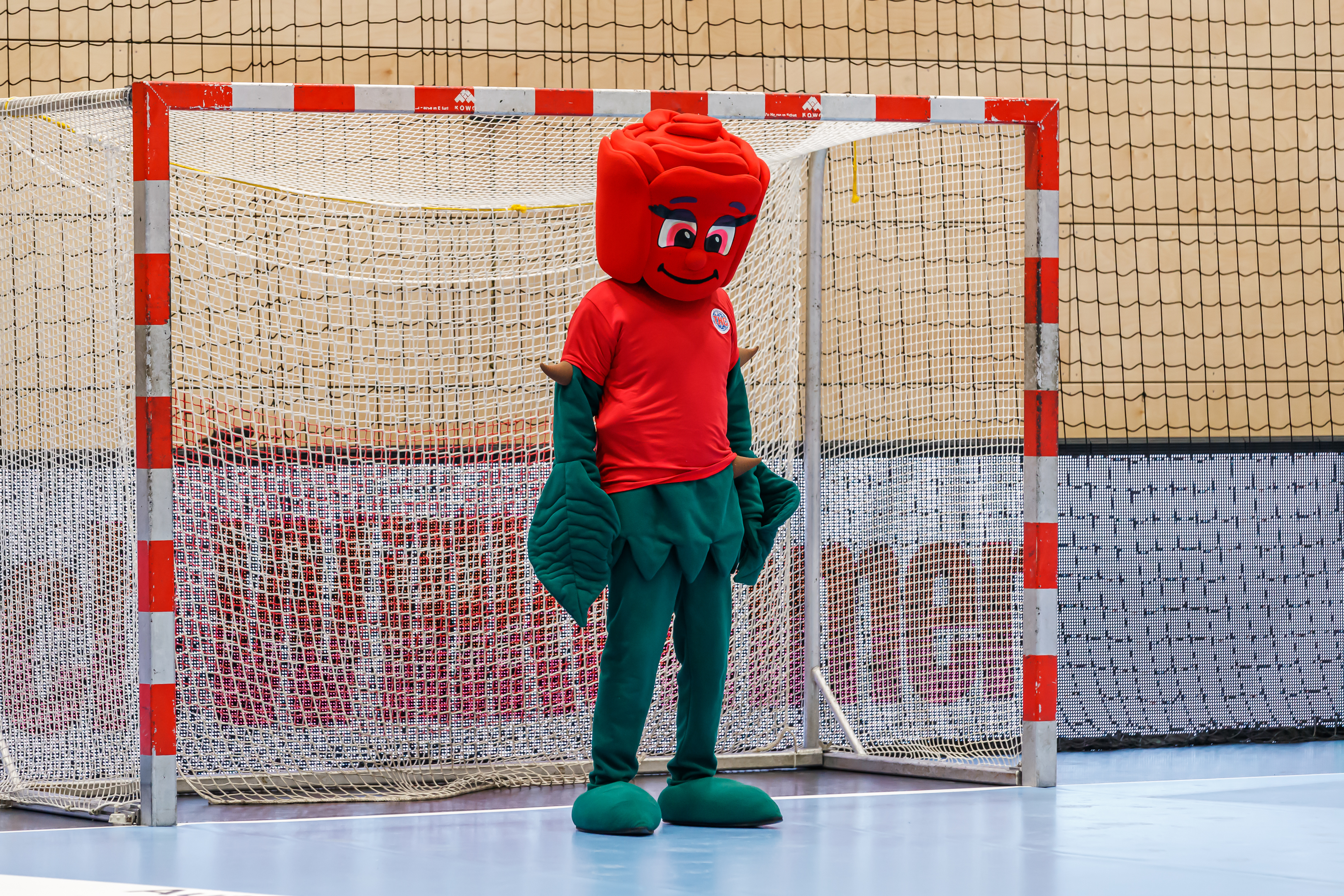
Rosalie – the official mascot of Thüringer HC

== Kits ==
HOME
2012–13	2013–14	2014–15	2015–16	2016–18	2020–

AWAY
2014–15	2015–16	2016–18

== Honours ==
- Handball-Bundesliga Frauen:
  - Winners (7): 2011, 2012, 2013, 2014, 2015, 2016, 2018
- DHB-Pokal:
  - Winners (3): 2011, 2013, 2019
- EHF European League:
  - Winners (1): 2025
- EHF Challenge Cup:
  - Finalists (1): 2009

== Team ==
=== Current squad ===
Squad for the 2026–27 season

Goalkeepers

- 11 (Germany) Laura Kuske
- 01 (Egypt) Maie Gomaa

Wingers
LW

- 26 (Hungary) Anna Szabó
- 22 (Germany) Teresa von Prittwitz

RW

- 19 (Germany) Sabrina Tröster
- 07 (Germany) Lotta Heider

Line players

- 57 (Austria) Josefine Huber
- 45 (Germany) Jolina Hohnstock
- 36 (Brazil) Marcela Arounian

Back players
LB

- 77 (Brazil) Kelly Rosa
- 38 (Germany) Dilayla Alarslan
- 05 (Hungary) Luca Csíkos
- 06 (Iceland) Alfa Brà Oddsdóttir Hagalín

CB

- 13 (Brazil) Giulia Guarieiro
- 23 (Japan) Natsuki Aizawa

RB

- 20 (Germany) Jana Scheib
- 17 (Germany) Levke Kretschmann

=== Transfers ===
Transfers for the 2026–27 season:

Joining

- (Germany) Sabrina Tröster (RW) (from (Germany) TuS Metzingen)
- (Germany) Jolina Hohnstock (LP) (from (Germany) Buxtehuder SV)
- (Germany) Levke Kretschmann (RB) (from (Germany) Buxtehuder SV)
- (Germany) Teresa von Prittwitz (LW) (from (Germany) Buxtehuder SV)
- (Hungary) Luca Csíkos (LB) (on loan from (Hungary) Ferencvárosi TC)
- (Brazil) Marcela Arounian (PV) (from (France) Saint-Amand Handball
- (Iceland) Alfa Brà Oddsdóttir (LB) (from (Iceland) Fram (women's handball))
- (Egypt) Maie Gomaa (GK) (from (Poland) AZS Politechnika Koszalin)

Leaving

- (Austria) Johanna Reichert (LB) (to (Romania) Gloria Bistrița)
- (Hungary) Csenge Kuczora (LB/CB) (to (Romania) CSM București)
- (Hungary) Luca Faragó (LP)
- (Netherlands) Nathalie Hendrikse (RW) (retires)
- (Denmark) Rikke Petersen (LW)
- (Denmark) Julie Holm (RB) (to (France) ESBF Besançon)
- (Italy) Anika Niederwieser (LB)
- (Sweden) Christina Lövgren Hallberg (GK) (to (Norway) Molde Elite)

== Notable former players ==
- (Germany) Anja Althaus (2012–2014)
- (Germany) Emily Bölk (2018–2020)
- (Germany) Dinah Eckerle (2009–2018, 2023–2025)
- (Germany) Ann-Cathrin Giegerich (2018–2020)
- (Germany) Ina Großmann (2018–2021)
- (Germany) Svenja Huber (2013–2016)
- (Germany) Anne Hubinger (2017–2019)
- (Germany) Jana Krause (2013–2020)
- (Germany) Saskia Lang (2017–2019)
- (Germany) Annika Lott (2022–2024)
- (Germany) Franziska Mietzner (2013–2015)
- (Germany) Ewgenija Minevskaja (2005–2013)
- (Germany) Alexandra Mazzucco (2017–2020)
- (Germany) Nina Müller (2018–2019)
- (Germany) Nadja Nadgornaja (2010–2015)
- (Germany) Meike Schmelzer (2014–2021)
- (Germany) Alicia Stolle (2018–2020)
- (Germany) Nora Reiche (2010–2012)
- (Germany) Jennifer Rode (2021–2024)
- (Germany) Isabell Roch (2006–2008)
- (Germany) Nicole Roth (2022–2024)
- (Germany) Johanna Stockschläder (2022–2024)
- (Germany) Kerstin Wohlbold (2010–2021)
- (Netherlands) Willemijn Karsten (2011–2012)
- (Netherlands) Pearl van der Wissel (2010–2011)
- (Netherlands) Danick Snelder (2010–2016)
- (Netherlands) Martine Smeets (2013–2015)
- (Netherlands) Anouk van de Wiel (2015–2017)
- (Netherlands) Anouk Nieuwenweg (2020)
- (Netherlands) Rinka Duijndam (2021–2022)
- (Sweden) Mikaela Mässing (2019–2020)
- (Sweden) Emma Ekenman-Fernis (2020–2022)
- (Sweden) Vilma Matthijs Holmberg (2022–2024)
- (Sweden) Irma Schjött (2022–2023)
- (Sweden) Ida Gullberg (2023–2025)
- (Austria) Beate Scheffknecht (2015–2022)
- (Austria) Petra Blazek (2020–2022)
- (Austria) Katrin Engel (2011–2017)
- (Austria) Sonja Frey (2012–2016, 2022–2024)
- (Austria) Johanna Reichert (2021–2026)
- (Romania) Crina Pintea (2015–2017)
- (Romania) Eliza Buceschi (2015–2016)
- (Romania) Melinda Geiger (2012)
- (Czech Republic) Iveta Korešová (2013–2021)
- (Czech Republic) Markéta Jeřábková (2020–2021)
- (Czech Republic) Dominika Zachová (2021–2023)
- (Spain) Macarena Aguilar (2016–2018)
- (Spain) Alexandrina Cabral (2013–2014)
- (Spain) Almudena Rodriguez (2019–2020)
- (Hungary) Szimonetta Planéta (2016–2017)
- (Hungary) Krisztina Triscsuk (2018–2019)
- (Hungary) Luca Szekerczés (2021–2022)
- (Denmark) Mie Augustesen (2012–2013)
- (Denmark) Annika Meyer (2021–2022)
- (Denmark) Nikoline Lundgreen (2022–2023)
- (Slovakia) Petra Popluhárová (2010–2015)
- (Slovakia) Lýdia Jakubisová (2011–2022)
- (France) Manon Houette (2016–2017)
- (France) Audrey Deroin (2015–2016)
- (Brazil) Patricia Batista da Silva (2017–2018)
- (Brazil) Idalina Mesquita (2010–2012)
- (Italy) Anika Niederwieser (2016–2018, 2021–)
- (Slovenia) Ana Gros (2012–2013)
- (Norway) Marie Davidsen (2019–2021)
- (Ukraine) Yuliya Snopova (2014–2015)
- (Serbia) Katarina Tomašević (2012–2013)
- (Japan) Yuki Tanabe (2021–2024)
- (Greece) Lamprini Tsàkalou (2021–2022)
- (Portugal) Mariana Lopes (2019–2021)
- (Tunisia) Ines Khouildi (2020–2022)
- (Turkey) Aslı İskit (2020–2022)
- (Switzerland) Kerstin Kündig (2020–2022, 2023–2025)
- (North Macedonia) Jovana Sazdovska (2018–2020)

== Head coach history ==
(Germany)	Herbert Müller	(2010–present)

== European record ==
=== EHF Champions League ===
Season	Competition	Round	Club	1st leg	2nd leg	Aggregate
2011-12	Champions League	Group Matches (Group A)	(Montenegro) ŽRK Budućnost Podgorica	23–27	35–25	4th place
2011-12	Champions League	Group Matches (Group A)	(Denmark) FC Midtjylland Håndbold	21–27	20–23	4th place
2011-12	Champions League	Group Matches (Group A)	(Norway) Byåsen HE	28–28	22–23	4th place
2012-13	Champions League	Group Matches (Group D)	(Russia) Zvezda Zvenigorod	20–23	24–31	3rd place
2012-13	Champions League	Group Matches (Group D)	(Montenegro) ŽRK Budućnost Podgorica	24–20	15–23	3rd place
2012-13	Champions League	Group Matches (Group D)	(Denmark) Viborg HK	34–30	29–26	3rd place
2013-14	Champions League	Group Matches (Group A)	(Hungary) Győri Audi ETO KC	25–33	22–29	2nd place
2013-14	Champions League	Group Matches (Group A)	(Austria) Hypo Niederösterreich	34–25	23–29	2nd place
2013-14	Champions League	Group Matches (Group A)	(Romania) HCM Baia Mare	36–29	19–20	2nd place
2013-14	Champions League	Main Round (Group 1)	(North Macedonia) HC Vardar	24–24	25–31	3rd place
2013-14	Champions League	Main Round (Group 1)	(Denmark) FC Midtjylland Håndbold	26–24	20–26	3rd place
2013-14	Champions League	Main Round (Group 1)	(Sweden) IK Sävehof	30–25	32–26	3rd place
2014-15	Champions League	Group Matches (Group B)	(Montenegro) ŽRK Budućnost Podgorica	22–27	14–23	3rd place
2014-15	Champions League	Group Matches (Group B)	(North Macedonia) HC Vardar	21–20	21–26	3rd place
2014-15	Champions League	Group Matches (Group B)	(Croatia) RK Podravka Koprivnica	33–20	32–28	3rd place
2014-15	Champions League	Main Round (Group 1)	(Russia) Dinamo Volgograd	30–33	30–30	4th place
2014-15	Champions League	Main Round (Group 1)	(Germany) HC Leipzig	27–23	34–25	4th place
2014-15	Champions League	Main Round (Group 1)	(Slovenia) RK Krim	33–21	26–23	4th place
2014-15	Champions League	Quarterfinals	(Norway) Larvik HK	26–29	18–36	44–65
2015-16	Champions League	Group Matches (Group B)	(Hungary) FTC-Rail Cargo Hungaria	27–30	28–32	3rd place
2015-16	Champions League	Group Matches (Group B)	(France) Fleury Loiret HB	27–27	21–27	3rd place
2015-16	Champions League	Group Matches (Group B)	(Croatia) RK Podravka Koprivnica	29–19	27–21	3rd place
2015-16	Champions League	Main Round (Group 1)	(Russia) Rostov-Don	28–32	24–30	6th place
2015-16	Champions League	Main Round (Group 1)	(Norway) Larvik HK	20–28	19–28	6th place
2015-16	Champions League	Main Round (Group 1)	(Romania) HCM Baia Mare	23–25	27–38	6th place
2016-17	Champions League	Group Matches (Group A)	(Montenegro) ŽRK Budućnost Podgorica	26–32	19–28	3rd place
2016-17	Champions League	Group Matches (Group A)	(France) Metz Handball	28–25	18–25	3rd place
2016-17	Champions League	Group Matches (Group A)	(Norway) Glassverket IF	24–16	33–27	3rd place
2016-17	Champions League	Main Round (Group 1)	(North Macedonia) HC Vardar	29–31	26–36	5th place
2016-17	Champions League	Main Round (Group 1)	(Hungary) FTC-Rail Cargo Hungaria	29–29	24–32	5th place
2016-17	Champions League	Main Round (Group 1)	(Russia) HC Astrakhanochka	34–22	24–26	5th place
2017-18	Champions League	Qualification Tournament	(Spain) CB Atlético Guardés	31–21		
2017-18	Champions League	Qualification Tournament	(Sweden) H 65 Höör	33–24		
2017-18	Champions League	Group Matches (Group C)	(North Macedonia) HC Vardar	21–29	21–29	3rd place
2017-18	Champions League	Group Matches (Group C)	(Hungary) FTC-Rail Cargo Hungaria	25–29	25–28	3rd place
2017-18	Champions League	Group Matches (Group C)	(Norway) Larvik HK	22–25	31–27	3rd place
2017-18	Champions League	Main Round (Group 2)	(France) Metz Handball	29–31	29–35	6th place
2017-18	Champions League	Main Round (Group 2)	(Montenegro) ŽRK Budućnost Podgorica	24–25	21–29	6th place
2017-18	Champions League	Main Round (Group 2)	(Germany) SG BBM Bietigheim	28–26	34–21	6th place
2018-19	Champions League	Group Matches (Group C)	(Hungary) Győri ETO KC	22–38	28–31	3rd place
2018-19	Champions League	Group Matches (Group C)	(Slovenia) RK Krim Ljubljana	26–26	20–27	3rd place
2018-19	Champions League	Group Matches (Group C)	(Croatia) RK Podravka Koprivnica	26–28	31–23	3rd place
2018-19	Champions League	Main Round (Group 2)	(Romania) CSM București	30–38	23–23	6th place
2018-19	Champions League	Main Round (Group 2)	(Norway) Vipers Kristiansand	21–29	24–31	6th place
2018-19	Champions League	Main Round (Group 2)	(Hungary) Ferencvárosi TC	32–35	29–30	6th place

=== EHF European League ===
Season	Competition	Round	Club	1st leg	2nd leg	Aggregate
2019–20	EHF Cup	Round 2	(Norway) Byåsen HE	29–25	29–24	58–49
2019–20	EHF Cup	Round 3	(Russia) HC Astrakhanochka	30–25	25–28	55–53
2019–20	EHF Cup	Group Matches (Group A)	(Czech Republic) DHK Baník Most	40–24	35–27	1st place
2019–20	EHF Cup	Group Matches (Group A)	(Turkey) Kastamonu GSK	27–24	30–24	1st place
2019–20	EHF Cup	Group Matches (Group A)	(Hungary) DVSC Schaeffler	26–23	26–19	1st place
2019–20	EHF Cup	Quarterfinals	(Croatia) Podravka Vegeta	23–27	28–34	51–61
2020–21	EHF European League	Qualification Round 2	(Austria) WAT Atzgersdorf	39–24	42–21	81–45
2020–21	EHF European League	Qualification Round 3	(Germany) HSG Blomberg-Lippe	27–31	30–20	57–51
2020–21	EHF European League	Group Matches (Group C)	(Romania) CS Minaur Baia Mare	0–10	10–0	4th place
2020–21	EHF European League	Group Matches (Group C)	(Russia) Astrakhanochka	22–29	0–10	4th place
2020–21	EHF European League	Group Matches (Group C)	(Norway) Storhamar Handball Elite	41–36	30–32	4th place
2021–22	EHF European League	Qualification Round 2	(Norway) Molde Elite	32–35	28–26	60–61
2022–23	EHF European League	Qualification Round 2	(France) Chambray Touraine	31–28	27–24	58–52
2022–23	EHF European League	Qualification Round 3	(Sweden) IK Sävehof	30–22	35–30	65–52
2022–23	EHF European League	Group Matches (Group C)	(France) Paris 92	28–24	25–26	1st place
2022–23	EHF European League	Group Matches (Group C)	(Romania) SCM Râmnicu Vâlcea	38–31	32–32	1st place
2022–23	EHF European League	Group Matches (Group C)	(Hungary) Váci NKSE	31–21	34–28	1st place
2022–23	EHF European League	Quarter-finals	(Norway) Sola HK	27–24	35–35	62–59
2022–23	EHF European League	Semi-final (F4)	(Denmark) Ikast Håndbold	26–31		
2022–23	EHF European League	Third-place match	(Germany) Borussia Dortmund	23–28		
2023–24	EHF European League	Group Matches (Group B)	(Romania) HC Dunărea Brăila	32–28	23–33	2nd place
2023–24	EHF European League	Group Matches (Group B)	(France) Chambray Touraine Handball	29–22	32–25	2nd place
2023–24	EHF European League	Group Matches (Group B)	(Croatia) RK Lokomotiva Zagreb	29–17	28–21	2nd place
2023–24	EHF European League	Quarter-finals	(Norway) Storhamar Håndball Elite	35–39	26–33	61–72
2024–25; Winner	EHF European League	Qualification Round 3	(Hungary) Váci NKSE	34–22	34–29	68–51
2024–25; Winner	EHF European League	Group Matches (Group A)	(Romania) HC Dunărea Brăila	38–28	22–26	2nd place
2024–25; Winner	EHF European League	Group Matches (Group A)	(Spain) CB Elche	27–26	28–27	2nd place
2024–25; Winner	EHF European League	Group Matches (Group A)	(Norway) Larvik HK	43–35	25–38	2nd place
2024–25; Winner	EHF European League	Quarter-finals	(Romania) SCM Râmnicu Vâlcea	35–29	30–32	65–61
2024–25; Winner	EHF European League	Semi-final (F4)	(France) Jeanne d'Arc Dijon Handball	35–29		
2024–25; Winner	EHF European League	Final (F4)	(Denmark) Ikast Håndbold	34–32		
2025–26	EHF European League	Group Matches (Group A)	(Norway) Larvik HK			
2025–26	EHF European League	Group Matches (Group A)	(Hungary) Mosonmagyaróvári KC SE		34–36	
2025–26	EHF European League	Group Matches (Group A)	(Romania) CS Minaur Baia Mare			

=== EHF Challenge Cup ===
Season	Competition	Round	Club	1st leg	2nd leg	Aggregate
2008–09	Challenge Cup	Round 3	(Netherlands) Zeeman Vastgoed SWE	35–23	36–24	71–47
2008–09	Challenge Cup	Last 16	(Greece) OF Nea Ionia	31–29	26–25	57–54
2008–09	Challenge Cup	Quarterfinals	(Serbia) ORK Vrnjacka Banja	35–32	28–27	63–59
2008–09	Challenge Cup	Semifinals	(Turkey) Izmir BSB SK	34–28	27–32	61–60
2008–09	Challenge Cup	Finals	(France) Nîmes	25–30	22–26	47–56
