= Odense Sports Park =

Sports venue in Odense, Denmark

Coordinates: 55.3977°N 10.3500°E

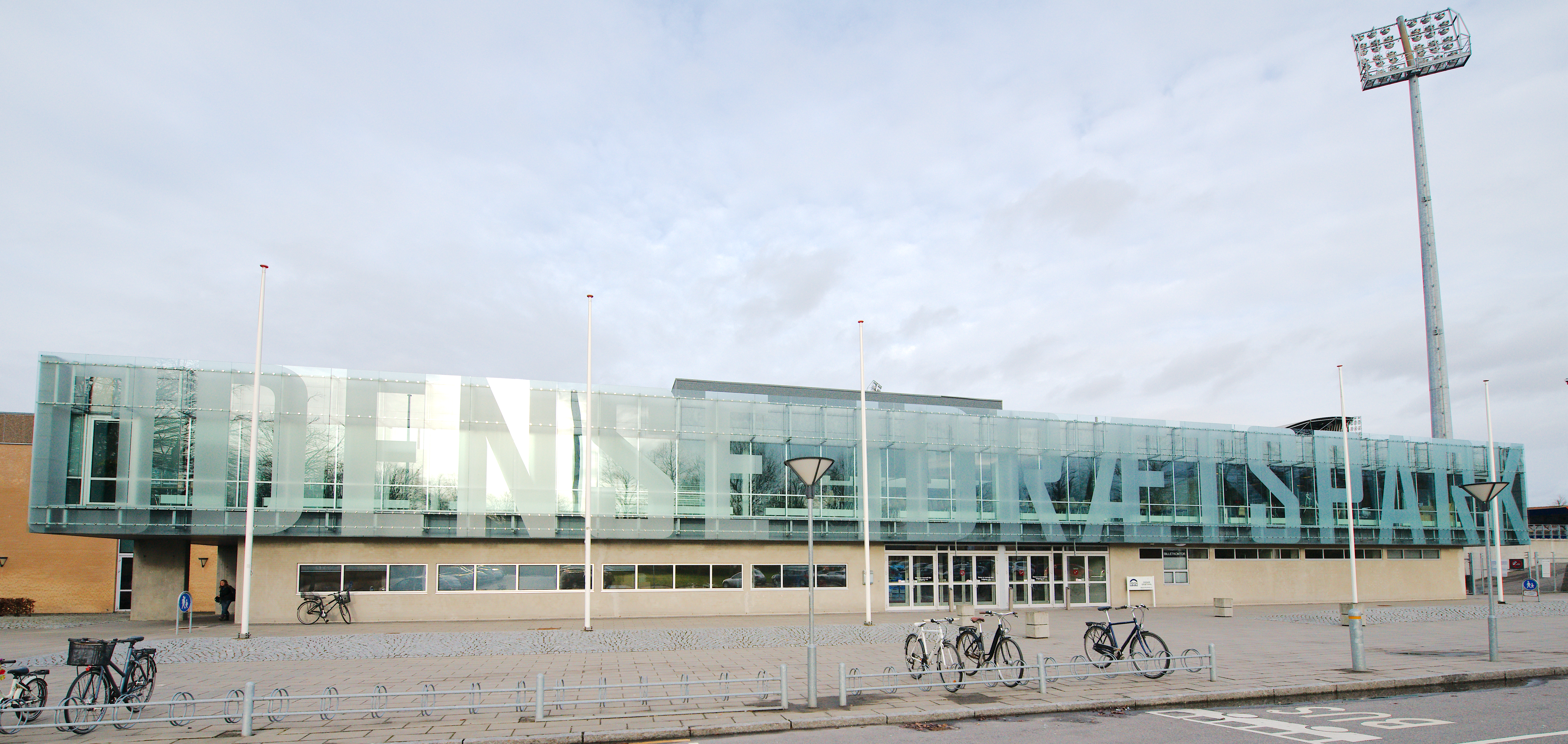
Odense Idrætspark

Odense Sports Park (Danish: Odense Idrætspark) is a sports complex located in Odense, Denmark. The complex belongs to Municipality of Odense and contains various sports venues including the Odense Stadion. It also has seven swimming pools open for public use.

== Sports venues ==
- Odense Stadium, home ground for Odense Boldklub, currently known as Nature Energy Park
- Odense Athletic Stadium
- Odense Cricket Stadium
- Odense Ice Stadium (Danish: Odense Isstadion)
- Odense Gymnastic Hall
- Sydbank Arena Odense (Danish: Odense Idrætshal), home to the handball team Odense Håndbold
- Thorvald Ellegaard Arena, a velodrome and indoor athletics arena, named after Danish cyclist Thorvald Ellegaard.
