= 2015–16 Women's EHF Champions League group stage =

This article describes the group stage of the 2015–16 Women's EHF Champions League.

== Format ==
In each group, teams played against each other in a double round-robin format, with home and away matches. After completion of the group stage matches, the top three teams of each group advanced to the main round.

=== Tiebreakers ===
In the group stage, teams are ranked according to points (2 points for a win, 1 point for a draw, 0 points for a loss). After completion of the group stage, if two or more teams have scored the same number of points, the ranking will be determined as follows (article 4.3.1, section II of regulations):

1. Highest number of points in matches between the teams directly involved;
2. Superior goal difference in matches between the teams directly involved;
3. Highest number of goals scored in matches between the teams directly involved (or in the away match in case of a two-team tie);
4. Superior goal difference in all matches of the group;
5. Highest number of plus goals in all matches of the group;
6. If the ranking of one of these teams is determined, the above criteria are consecutively followed until the ranking of all teams is determined. If no ranking can be determined, the following criteria apply:
7. Drawing of lots.

During the group stage, only criteria 1, 4 and 5 apply to determine the provisional ranking of teams.

== Seedings ==
The seedings were announced on 23 June 2015. The draw was held on 26 June 2015.

Pot 1	Pot 2	Pot 3	Pot 4
(Hungary) FTC-Rail Cargo Hungaria (Montenegro) ŽRK Budućnost Podgorica (Norway) Larvik HK (Denmark) Midtjylland	(North Macedonia) Vardar (Slovenia) Krim (Romania) CSM București (Germany) Thüringer HC	(Russia) Rostov-Don (Sweden) IK Sävehof (Austria) Hypo Niederösterreich (Croatia) Podravka Koprivnica	(France) Fleury Loiret HB (Poland) MKS Selgros Lublin (Hungary) Győri Audi ETO KC (Romania) HCM Baia Mare

Notes

1. ^{TH} Title holders.
2. ^{QS} Winners of the qualification stage.

== Groups ==
=== Group A ===
Pos	Team	Pld	W	D	L	GF	GA	GD	Pts	Qualification
1	(Russia) Rostov-Don	6	6	0	0	173	148	+25	12	Advanced to main round
2	(Norway) Larvik HK	6	4	0	2	173	153	+20	8	Advanced to main round
3	(Romania) HCM Baia Mare	6	2	0	4	165	162	+3	4	Advanced to main round
4	(Slovenia) Krim	6	0	0	6	160	208	−48	0	

Source: EHF
Rules for classification: 1) Points; 2) Head-to-head; 3) Goal difference; 4) Goals scored

16 October 2015; 19:00	Krim (Slovenia)	27–33	(Romania) HCM Baia Mare	Arena Stožice, Ljubljana; Attendance: 1,500; Referees: Sigurjónsson, Pétursson (ISL)
16 October 2015; 19:00	Mavsar 12	(15–16)	Abbingh, Pineau 9	Arena Stožice, Ljubljana; Attendance: 1,500; Referees: Sigurjónsson, Pétursson (ISL)
16 October 2015; 19:00	2× (yellow card) 4× (suspension)	Report	3× (yellow card) 3× (suspension)	Arena Stožice, Ljubljana; Attendance: 1,500; Referees: Sigurjónsson, Pétursson (ISL)

17 October 2015; 18:30	Larvik HK (Norway)	21–27	(Russia) Rostov-Don	Arena Larvik, Larvik; Attendance: 2,015; Referees: Jurinović, Mrvica (CRO)
17 October 2015; 18:30	N. Mørk 6	(10–14)	Ilina 9	Arena Larvik, Larvik; Attendance: 2,015; Referees: Jurinović, Mrvica (CRO)
17 October 2015; 18:30	3× (yellow card) 3× (suspension)	Report	3× (yellow card) 1× (suspension)	Arena Larvik, Larvik; Attendance: 2,015; Referees: Jurinović, Mrvica (CRO)

23 October 2015; 18:00	HCM Baia Mare (Romania)	29–31	(Norway) Larvik HK	Sala Sporturilor „Lascăr Pană”, Baia Mare; Attendance: 2,500; Referees: Brunovský, Čanda (SVK)
23 October 2015; 18:00	Pineau 8	(14–19)	N. Mørk, T. Mørk 9	Sala Sporturilor „Lascăr Pană”, Baia Mare; Attendance: 2,500; Referees: Brunovský, Čanda (SVK)
23 October 2015; 18:00	3× (yellow card) 2× (suspension)	Report	3× (yellow card) 3× (suspension)	Sala Sporturilor „Lascăr Pană”, Baia Mare; Attendance: 2,500; Referees: Brunovský, Čanda (SVK)

24 October 2015; 16:00	Rostov-Don (Russia)	35–25	(Slovenia) Krim	Rostov-on-Don Palace of Sports, Rostov-on-Don; Attendance: 3,000; Referees: Panayides, Andreou (CYP)
24 October 2015; 16:00	Managarova 9	(16–12)	Bajramoska 6	Rostov-on-Don Palace of Sports, Rostov-on-Don; Attendance: 3,000; Referees: Panayides, Andreou (CYP)
24 October 2015; 16:00	3× (yellow card) 2× (suspension)	Report	3× (yellow card) 3× (suspension)	Rostov-on-Don Palace of Sports, Rostov-on-Don; Attendance: 3,000; Referees: Panayides, Andreou (CYP)

30 October 2015; 18:00	Krim (Slovenia)	21–37	(Norway) Larvik HK	Arena Stožice, Ljubljana; Attendance: 1,000; Referees: Vranes, Wenninger (AUT)
30 October 2015; 18:00	Barič 5	(10–21)	Kurtović 8	Arena Stožice, Ljubljana; Attendance: 1,000; Referees: Vranes, Wenninger (AUT)
30 October 2015; 18:00	3× (yellow card) 5× (suspension)	Report	2× (yellow card) 3× (suspension)	Arena Stožice, Ljubljana; Attendance: 1,000; Referees: Vranes, Wenninger (AUT)

30 October 2015; 18:00	HCM Baia Mare (Romania)	20–22	(Russia) Rostov-Don	Sala Sporturilor „Lascăr Pană”, Baia Mare; Attendance: 2,000; Referees: Marín, García (ESP)
30 October 2015; 18:00	Abbingh 6	(10–13)	three players 5	Sala Sporturilor „Lascăr Pană”, Baia Mare; Attendance: 2,000; Referees: Marín, García (ESP)
30 October 2015; 18:00	3× (yellow card) 3× (suspension) 1× (red card)	Report	3× (yellow card) 2× (suspension)	Sala Sporturilor „Lascăr Pană”, Baia Mare; Attendance: 2,000; Referees: Marín, García (ESP)

7 November 2015; 17:00	Rostov-Don (Russia)	27–26	(Romania) HCM Baia Mare	Rostov-on-Don Palace of Sports, Rostov-on-Don; Attendance: 2,500; Referees: Krkacev, Kolevski (MKD)
7 November 2015; 17:00	Managarova 6	(14–15)	Pineau 10	Rostov-on-Don Palace of Sports, Rostov-on-Don; Attendance: 2,500; Referees: Krkacev, Kolevski (MKD)
7 November 2015; 17:00	3× (yellow card) 2× (suspension)	Report	3× (yellow card) 4× (suspension)	Rostov-on-Don Palace of Sports, Rostov-on-Don; Attendance: 2,500; Referees: Krkacev, Kolevski (MKD)

7 November 2015; 18:30	Larvik HK (Norway)	32–28	(Slovenia) Krim	Arena Larvik, Larvik; Attendance: 1,710; Referees: Horváth, Marton (HUN)
7 November 2015; 18:30	Kurtović 10	(17–15)	Omoregie 9	Arena Larvik, Larvik; Attendance: 1,710; Referees: Horváth, Marton (HUN)
7 November 2015; 18:30	3× (yellow card) 3× (suspension)	Report	3× (yellow card) 5× (suspension)	Arena Larvik, Larvik; Attendance: 1,710; Referees: Horváth, Marton (HUN)

14 November 2015; 18:00	Rostov-Don (Russia)	26–25	(Norway) Larvik HK	Rostov-on-Don Palace of Sports, Rostov-on-Don; Attendance: 2,500; Referees: Konjičanin, Konjičanin (BIH)
14 November 2015; 18:00	Makeeva, Managarova 5	(15–14)	Breistøl 13	Rostov-on-Don Palace of Sports, Rostov-on-Don; Attendance: 2,500; Referees: Konjičanin, Konjičanin (BIH)
14 November 2015; 18:00	3× (yellow card) 3× (suspension)	Report	3× (yellow card) 2× (suspension)	Rostov-on-Don Palace of Sports, Rostov-on-Don; Attendance: 2,500; Referees: Konjičanin, Konjičanin (BIH)

14 November 2015; 18:00	HCM Baia Mare (Romania)	35–28	(Slovenia) Krim	Sala Sporturilor „Lascăr Pană”, Baia Mare; Attendance: 2,000; Referees: Brkic, Jusufhodzic (AUT)
14 November 2015; 18:00	Pineau 9	(16–14)	Omoregie 10	Sala Sporturilor „Lascăr Pană”, Baia Mare; Attendance: 2,000; Referees: Brkic, Jusufhodzic (AUT)
14 November 2015; 18:00	3× (yellow card) 4× (suspension)	Report	3× (yellow card) 1× (suspension)	Sala Sporturilor „Lascăr Pană”, Baia Mare; Attendance: 2,000; Referees: Brkic, Jusufhodzic (AUT)

20 November 2015; 18:00	Krim (Slovenia)	31–36	(Russia) Rostov-Don	Arena Stožice, Ljubljana; Attendance: 500; Referees: Schulze, Tönnies (GER)
20 November 2015; 18:00	Baric 8	(14–18)	Ilina 7	Arena Stožice, Ljubljana; Attendance: 500; Referees: Schulze, Tönnies (GER)
20 November 2015; 18:00	3× (yellow card) 2× (suspension)	Report	3× (yellow card) 6× (suspension)	Arena Stožice, Ljubljana; Attendance: 500; Referees: Schulze, Tönnies (GER)

21 November 2015; 18:30	Larvik HK (Norway)	27–22	(Romania) HCM Baia Mare	Arena Larvik, Larvik; Attendance: 1,873; Referees: Bounouara, Sami (FRA)
21 November 2015; 18:30	N. Mørk 11	(12–12)	Abbingh, Pineau 4	Arena Larvik, Larvik; Attendance: 1,873; Referees: Bounouara, Sami (FRA)
21 November 2015; 18:30	3× (yellow card) 3× (suspension)	Report	3× (yellow card) 3× (suspension)	Arena Larvik, Larvik; Attendance: 1,873; Referees: Bounouara, Sami (FRA)

=== Group B ===
Pos	Team	Pld	W	D	L	GF	GA	GD	Pts	Qualification
1	(Hungary) FTC-Rail Cargo Hungaria	6	5	1	0	181	146	+35	11	Advanced to main round
2	(France) Fleury Loiret HB	6	2	3	1	144	149	−5	7	Advanced to main round
3	(Germany) Thüringer HC	6	2	1	3	159	156	+3	5	Advanced to main round
4	(Croatia) Podravka Koprivnica	6	0	1	5	117	150	−33	1	

Source: EHF
Rules for classification: 1) Points; 2) Head-to-head; 3) Goal difference; 4) Goals scored

18 October 2015; 14:00	Thüringer HC (Germany)	27–27	(France) Fleury Loiret HB	Wiedigsburghalle, Nordhausen; Attendance: 1,600; Referees: Arntsen, Røen (NOR)
18 October 2015; 14:00	Buceschi, Huber 5	(15–15)	Niombla 7	Wiedigsburghalle, Nordhausen; Attendance: 1,600; Referees: Arntsen, Røen (NOR)
18 October 2015; 14:00	3× (yellow card) 4× (suspension)	Report	2× (yellow card) 3× (suspension)	Wiedigsburghalle, Nordhausen; Attendance: 1,600; Referees: Arntsen, Røen (NOR)

18 October 2015; 17:15	FTC-Rail Cargo Hungaria (Hungary)	28–16	(Croatia) Podravka Koprivnica	OBO Aréna, Dabas; Attendance: 2,498; Referees: Vitaku, Vitaku (Kosovo)
18 October 2015; 17:15	Szekerczés 7	(13–5)	Krsnik 4	OBO Aréna, Dabas; Attendance: 2,498; Referees: Vitaku, Vitaku (Kosovo)
18 October 2015; 17:15	3× (yellow card) 1× (suspension)	Report	3× (yellow card) 2× (suspension)	OBO Aréna, Dabas; Attendance: 2,498; Referees: Vitaku, Vitaku (Kosovo)

25 October 2015; 15:15	Fleury Loiret HB (France)	28–28	(Hungary) FTC-Rail Cargo Hungaria	Palais des Sports, Orléans; Attendance: 2,300; Referees: Kijauskaitė, Žalienė (LTU)
25 October 2015; 15:15	Barbosa 11	(14–11)	Pena 5	Palais des Sports, Orléans; Attendance: 2,300; Referees: Kijauskaitė, Žalienė (LTU)
25 October 2015; 15:15	3× (yellow card) 2× (suspension)	Report	3× (yellow card) 4× (suspension)	Palais des Sports, Orléans; Attendance: 2,300; Referees: Kijauskaitė, Žalienė (LTU)

25 October 2015; 17:25	Podravka Koprivnica (Croatia)	21–27	(Germany) Thüringer HC	"'Fran Galović'", Koprivnica; Attendance: 2,000; Referees: Freitas, Carvalho (POR)
25 October 2015; 17:25	Dežić, Milošević 5	(13–11)	Buceschi, Huber 7	"'Fran Galović'", Koprivnica; Attendance: 2,000; Referees: Freitas, Carvalho (POR)
25 October 2015; 17:25	3× (yellow card) 5× (suspension)	Report	2× (yellow card) 4× (suspension) 1× (red card)	"'Fran Galović'", Koprivnica; Attendance: 2,000; Referees: Freitas, Carvalho (POR)

1 November 2015; 14:00	Thüringer HC (Germany)	27–30	(Hungary) FTC-Rail Cargo Hungaria	Wiedigsburghalle, Nordhausen; Attendance: 1,900; Referees: Marić, Mašić (SRB)
1 November 2015; 14:00	Huber 7	(13–18)	Szucsánszki 8	Wiedigsburghalle, Nordhausen; Attendance: 1,900; Referees: Marić, Mašić (SRB)
1 November 2015; 14:00	3× (yellow card) 3× (suspension)	Report	3× (yellow card) 5× (suspension)	Wiedigsburghalle, Nordhausen; Attendance: 1,900; Referees: Marić, Mašić (SRB)

1 November 2015; 17:30	Podravka Koprivnica (Croatia)	20–20	(France) Fleury Loiret HB	"'Fran Galović'", Koprivnica; Attendance: 2,000; Referees: Brunner, Salah (SUI)
1 November 2015; 17:30	Dežić, Franković 5	(11–13)	Barbosa 8	"'Fran Galović'", Koprivnica; Attendance: 2,000; Referees: Brunner, Salah (SUI)
1 November 2015; 17:30	3× (yellow card) 4× (suspension)	Report	2× (yellow card) 4× (suspension)	"'Fran Galović'", Koprivnica; Attendance: 2,000; Referees: Brunner, Salah (SUI)

7 November 2015; 18:00	FTC-Rail Cargo Hungaria (Hungary)	32–28	(Germany) Thüringer HC	SYMA Sports and Conference Centre, Budapest; Attendance: 3,000; Referees: Lah, Sok (SLO)
7 November 2015; 18:00	Pena 5	(19–12)	Luzumová 6	SYMA Sports and Conference Centre, Budapest; Attendance: 3,000; Referees: Lah, Sok (SLO)
7 November 2015; 18:00	3× (yellow card) 3× (suspension)	Report	3× (yellow card) 4× (suspension)	SYMA Sports and Conference Centre, Budapest; Attendance: 3,000; Referees: Lah, Sok (SLO)

8 November 2015; 17:30	Fleury Loiret HB (France)	19–17	(Croatia) Podravka Koprivnica	Palais des Sports, Orléans; Attendance: 2,400; Referees: Stenrand, Birch (DEN)
8 November 2015; 17:30	Niombla 5	(11–6)	Krsnik 5	Palais des Sports, Orléans; Attendance: 2,400; Referees: Stenrand, Birch (DEN)
8 November 2015; 17:30	3× (yellow card) 6× (suspension)	Report	3× (yellow card) 1× (suspension)	Palais des Sports, Orléans; Attendance: 2,400; Referees: Stenrand, Birch (DEN)

15 November 2015; 17:25	Podravka Koprivnica (Croatia)	24–27	(Hungary) FTC-Rail Cargo Hungaria	"'Fran Galović'", Koprivnica; Attendance: 2,195; Referees: Năstase, Stancu (ROU)
15 November 2015; 17:25	Franković 5	(12–16)	Szucsánszki 6	"'Fran Galović'", Koprivnica; Attendance: 2,195; Referees: Năstase, Stancu (ROU)
15 November 2015; 17:25	3× (yellow card) 5× (suspension)	Report	3× (yellow card) 5× (suspension)	"'Fran Galović'", Koprivnica; Attendance: 2,195; Referees: Năstase, Stancu (ROU)

21 November 2015; 14:00	Thüringer HC (Germany)	29–19	(Croatia) Podravka Koprivnica	Wiedigsburghalle, Nordhausen; Attendance: 1,600; Referees: Kiyashko, Kiselev (RUS)
21 November 2015; 14:00	Buceschi 8	(13–6)	Nemaskalo 5	Wiedigsburghalle, Nordhausen; Attendance: 1,600; Referees: Kiyashko, Kiselev (RUS)
21 November 2015; 14:00	3× (yellow card) 3× (suspension)	Report	3× (yellow card) 3× (suspension)	Wiedigsburghalle, Nordhausen; Attendance: 1,600; Referees: Kiyashko, Kiselev (RUS)

22 November 2015; 17:00	FTC-Rail Cargo Hungaria (Hungary)	36–23	(France) Fleury Loiret HB	SYMA Sports and Conference Centre, Budapest; Attendance: 2,800; Referees: Brunovský, Čanda (SVK)
22 November 2015; 17:00	Zácsik 11	(24–12)	Barbosa, Niombla 5	SYMA Sports and Conference Centre, Budapest; Attendance: 2,800; Referees: Brunovský, Čanda (SVK)
22 November 2015; 17:00	3× (yellow card) 4× (suspension)	Report	3× (yellow card) 3× (suspension)	SYMA Sports and Conference Centre, Budapest; Attendance: 2,800; Referees: Brunovský, Čanda (SVK)

6 January 2016; 18:45	Fleury Loiret HB (France)	27–21	(Germany) Thüringer HC	Palais des Sports, Orléans; Attendance: 2,000; Referees: Ilieva, Karbeska (MKD)
6 January 2016; 18:45	Niombla 9	(10–12)	Snelder 6	Palais des Sports, Orléans; Attendance: 2,000; Referees: Ilieva, Karbeska (MKD)
6 January 2016; 18:45	3× (yellow card) 2× (suspension)	Report	3× (yellow card) 3× (suspension)	Palais des Sports, Orléans; Attendance: 2,000; Referees: Ilieva, Karbeska (MKD)

Notes

1. The match was originally scheduled at 15 November 2015 but was cancelled due to the November 2015 Paris attacks.

=== Group C ===
Pos	Team	Pld	W	D	L	GF	GA	GD	Pts	Qualification
1	(Hungary) Győri Audi ETO KC	6	4	1	1	164	134	+30	9	Advanced to main round
2	(North Macedonia) Vardar	6	4	0	2	182	144	+38	8	Advanced to main round
3	(Denmark) Midtjylland	6	3	1	2	153	149	+4	7	Advanced to main round
4	(Austria) Hypo Niederösterreich	6	0	0	6	135	207	−72	0	

Source: EHF
Rules for classification: 1) Points; 2) Head-to-head; 3) Goal difference; 4) Goals scored

17 October 2015; 20:15	Vardar (North Macedonia)	22–27	(Hungary) Győri Audi ETO KC	Jane Sandanski Arena, Skopje; Attendance: 3,800; Referees: Marín, García (ESP)
17 October 2015; 20:15	Sokač 5	(10–13)	Kovacsics 6	Jane Sandanski Arena, Skopje; Attendance: 3,800; Referees: Marín, García (ESP)
17 October 2015; 20:15	3× (yellow card) 2× (suspension)	Report	3× (yellow card) 4× (suspension) 1× (red card)	Jane Sandanski Arena, Skopje; Attendance: 3,800; Referees: Marín, García (ESP)

18 October 2015; 15:10	Midtjylland (Denmark)	33–21	(Austria) Hypo Niederösterreich	Ikast-Brande Arena, Ikast; Attendance: 1,227; Referees: Mitrović, Vešović (MNE)
18 October 2015; 15:10	Østergaard 9	(14–11)	Kovács 6	Ikast-Brande Arena, Ikast; Attendance: 1,227; Referees: Mitrović, Vešović (MNE)
18 October 2015; 15:10	3× (yellow card) 1× (suspension)	Report	3× (yellow card) 3× (suspension)	Ikast-Brande Arena, Ikast; Attendance: 1,227; Referees: Mitrović, Vešović (MNE)

24 October 2015; 20:15	Hypo Niederösterreich (Austria)	25–38	(North Macedonia) Vardar	Bundessport- und Freizeitzentrum Südstadt, Maria Enzersdorf; Attendance: 1,100; Referees: Alpaidze, Berezkina (RUS)
24 October 2015; 20:15	Tóthová 6	(9–22)	four players 4	Bundessport- und Freizeitzentrum Südstadt, Maria Enzersdorf; Attendance: 1,100; Referees: Alpaidze, Berezkina (RUS)
24 October 2015; 20:15	3× (yellow card) 5× (suspension) 1× (red card)	Report	3× (yellow card) 4× (suspension)	Bundessport- und Freizeitzentrum Südstadt, Maria Enzersdorf; Attendance: 1,100; Referees: Alpaidze, Berezkina (RUS)

25 October 2015; 19:00	Győri Audi ETO KC (Hungary)	21–26	(Denmark) Midtjylland	Audi Aréna, Győr; Attendance: 4,617; Referees: Rakytina, Tkachuk (UKR)
25 October 2015; 19:00	Görbicz 5	(11–11)	Burgaard 8	Audi Aréna, Győr; Attendance: 4,617; Referees: Rakytina, Tkachuk (UKR)
25 October 2015; 19:00	3× (yellow card) 2× (suspension)	Report	3× (yellow card) 6× (suspension)	Audi Aréna, Győr; Attendance: 4,617; Referees: Rakytina, Tkachuk (UKR)

31 October 2015; 20:15	Hypo Niederösterreich (Austria)	21–29	(Hungary) Győri Audi ETO KC	Bundessport- und Freizeitzentrum Südstadt, Maria Enzersdorf; Attendance: 900; Referees: Schulze, Tönnies (GER)
31 October 2015; 20:15	Tóthová 10	(6–15)	Planéta, Sulland 4	Bundessport- und Freizeitzentrum Südstadt, Maria Enzersdorf; Attendance: 900; Referees: Schulze, Tönnies (GER)
31 October 2015; 20:15	2× (yellow card) 4× (suspension)	Report	3× (yellow card) 2× (suspension)	Bundessport- und Freizeitzentrum Südstadt, Maria Enzersdorf; Attendance: 900; Referees: Schulze, Tönnies (GER)

1 November 2015; 15:15	Vardar (North Macedonia)	33–24	(Denmark) Midtjylland	Jane Sandanski Arena, Skopje; Attendance: 3,000; Referees: Florescu, Stoia (ROU)
1 November 2015; 15:15	Penezić 10	(16–8)	Østergaard 5	Jane Sandanski Arena, Skopje; Attendance: 3,000; Referees: Florescu, Stoia (ROU)
1 November 2015; 15:15	3× (yellow card) 2× (suspension)	Report	3× (yellow card)	Jane Sandanski Arena, Skopje; Attendance: 3,000; Referees: Florescu, Stoia (ROU)

8 November 2015; 17:00	Midtjylland (Denmark)	15–25	(North Macedonia) Vardar	Ikast-Brande Arena, Ikast; Attendance: 1,720; Referees: Bonaventura, Bonaventura (FRA)
8 November 2015; 17:00	Ahlm, Burgaard 3	(11–12)	Lekić 6	Ikast-Brande Arena, Ikast; Attendance: 1,720; Referees: Bonaventura, Bonaventura (FRA)
8 November 2015; 17:00	3× (yellow card) 2× (suspension)	Report	3× (yellow card) 2× (suspension)	Ikast-Brande Arena, Ikast; Attendance: 1,720; Referees: Bonaventura, Bonaventura (FRA)

8 November 2015; 17:00	Győri Audi ETO KC (Hungary)	37–16	(Austria) Hypo Niederösterreich	Audi Aréna, Győr; Attendance: 4,491; Referees: Brehmer, Skowronek (POL)
8 November 2015; 17:00	Løke, Tomori 7	(17–9)	Tóthová 3	Audi Aréna, Győr; Attendance: 4,491; Referees: Brehmer, Skowronek (POL)
8 November 2015; 17:00	2× (yellow card) 2× (suspension)	Report	3× (yellow card) 1× (suspension)	Audi Aréna, Győr; Attendance: 4,491; Referees: Brehmer, Skowronek (POL)

13 November 2015; 20:25	Hypo Niederösterreich (Austria)	27–33	(Denmark) Midtjylland	Bundessport- und Freizeitzentrum Südstadt, Maria Enzersdorf; Attendance: 800; Referees: Kijauskaitė, Žalienė (LTU)
13 November 2015; 20:25	Tóthová 7	(10–16)	Bøgelund 8	Bundessport- und Freizeitzentrum Südstadt, Maria Enzersdorf; Attendance: 800; Referees: Kijauskaitė, Žalienė (LTU)
13 November 2015; 20:25	3× (yellow card) 2× (suspension)	Report	3× (yellow card) 4× (suspension)	Bundessport- und Freizeitzentrum Südstadt, Maria Enzersdorf; Attendance: 800; Referees: Kijauskaitė, Žalienė (LTU)

14 November 2015; 16:30	Győri Audi ETO KC (Hungary)	28−27	(North Macedonia) Vardar	Audi Aréna, Győr; Attendance: 5,089; Referees: Brunner, Salah (SUI)
14 November 2015; 16:30	Görbicz 8	(14−17)	three players 4	Audi Aréna, Győr; Attendance: 5,089; Referees: Brunner, Salah (SUI)
14 November 2015; 16:30	3× (yellow card) 5× (suspension) 1× (red card)	Report	3× (yellow card) 6× (suspension) 1× (red card)	Audi Aréna, Győr; Attendance: 5,089; Referees: Brunner, Salah (SUI)

21 November 2015; 17:30	Vardar (North Macedonia)	37–25	(Austria) Hypo Niederösterreich	Jane Sandanski Arena, Skopje; Attendance: 2,500; Referees: Mandák, Rudinský (SVK)
21 November 2015; 17:30	Lekić 9	(15–14)	Thurner 6	Jane Sandanski Arena, Skopje; Attendance: 2,500; Referees: Mandák, Rudinský (SVK)
21 November 2015; 17:30	2× (yellow card) 1× (suspension)	Report	2× (yellow card) 4× (suspension)	Jane Sandanski Arena, Skopje; Attendance: 2,500; Referees: Mandák, Rudinský (SVK)

22 November 2015; 15:10	Midtjylland (Denmark)	22–22	(Hungary) Győri Audi ETO KC	Ikast-Brande Arena, Ikast; Attendance: 1,843; Referees: Nikolić, Stojković (SRB)
22 November 2015; 15:10	Jörgensen, Woller 5	(12–10)	Amorim, Görbicz 5	Ikast-Brande Arena, Ikast; Attendance: 1,843; Referees: Nikolić, Stojković (SRB)
22 November 2015; 15:10	3× (yellow card) 2× (suspension)	Report	4× (yellow card) 4× (suspension)	Ikast-Brande Arena, Ikast; Attendance: 1,843; Referees: Nikolić, Stojković (SRB)

=== Group D ===
Pos	Team	Pld	W	D	L	GF	GA	GD	Pts	Qualification
1	(Montenegro) Budućnost	6	5	1	0	169	131	+38	11	Advanced to main round
2	(Romania) CSM București	6	4	1	1	163	138	+25	9	Advanced to main round
3	(Sweden) IK Sävehof	6	2	0	4	138	158	−20	4	Advanced to main round
4	(Poland) MKS Selgros Lublin	6	0	0	6	141	184	−43	0	

Source: EHF
Rules for classification: 1) Points; 2) Head-to-head; 3) Goal difference; 4) Goals scored

16 October 2015; 18:00	CSM București (Romania)	33–21	(Poland) MKS Selgros Lublin	Polyvalent Hall, Bucharest; Attendance: 3,500; Referees: Ilieva, Karbeska (MKD)
16 October 2015; 18:00	three players 6	(14–13)	Gega, Niedźwiedź 5	Polyvalent Hall, Bucharest; Attendance: 3,500; Referees: Ilieva, Karbeska (MKD)
16 October 2015; 18:00	3× (yellow card) 3× (suspension)	Report	3× (yellow card) 2× (suspension)	Polyvalent Hall, Bucharest; Attendance: 3,500; Referees: Ilieva, Karbeska (MKD)

18 October 2015; 19:00	Budućnost (Montenegro)	33–20	(Sweden) IK Sävehof	Morača Sports Center, Podgorica; Attendance: 3,500; Referees: Krkacev, Kolevski (MKD)
18 October 2015; 19:00	Mehmedović 6	(17–8)	Eriksson 5	Morača Sports Center, Podgorica; Attendance: 3,500; Referees: Krkacev, Kolevski (MKD)
18 October 2015; 19:00	3× (yellow card) 2× (suspension)	Report	3× (yellow card) 3× (suspension)	Morača Sports Center, Podgorica; Attendance: 3,500; Referees: Krkacev, Kolevski (MKD)

23 October 2015; 18:00	MKS Selgros Lublin (Poland)	23–31	(Montenegro) Budućnost	Hala Sportowo-Widowiskowa „Globus”, Lublin; Attendance: 2,850; Referees: Brkic, Jusufhodzic (AUT)
23 October 2015; 18:00	Niedźwiedź 8	(13–17)	Neagu 9	Hala Sportowo-Widowiskowa „Globus”, Lublin; Attendance: 2,850; Referees: Brkic, Jusufhodzic (AUT)
23 October 2015; 18:00	3× (yellow card) 3× (suspension)	Report	3× (yellow card) 5× (suspension)	Hala Sportowo-Widowiskowa „Globus”, Lublin; Attendance: 2,850; Referees: Brkic, Jusufhodzic (AUT)

23 October 2015; 19:00	IK Sävehof (Sweden)	17–28	(Romania) CSM București	Partillebohallen, Partille; Attendance: 1,305; Referees: Mandák, Rudinský (SVK)
23 October 2015; 19:00	Mellegard 4	(9–13)	Jørgensen 7	Partillebohallen, Partille; Attendance: 1,305; Referees: Mandák, Rudinský (SVK)
23 October 2015; 19:00	3× (yellow card) 4× (suspension)	Report	3× (yellow card) 2× (suspension)	Partillebohallen, Partille; Attendance: 1,305; Referees: Mandák, Rudinský (SVK)

30 October 2015; 18:00	MKS Selgros Lublin (Poland)	21–34	(Sweden) IK Sävehof	Hala Sportowo-Widowiskowa „Globus”, Lublin; Attendance: 2,200; Referees: Horváth, Marton (HUN)
30 October 2015; 18:00	Repelewska 6	(10–17)	Ekenman-Fernis 6	Hala Sportowo-Widowiskowa „Globus”, Lublin; Attendance: 2,200; Referees: Horváth, Marton (HUN)
30 October 2015; 18:00	2× (yellow card)	Report	3× (yellow card) 3× (suspension)	Hala Sportowo-Widowiskowa „Globus”, Lublin; Attendance: 2,200; Referees: Horváth, Marton (HUN)

1 November 2015; 19:00	CSM București (Romania)	22–28	(Montenegro) Budućnost	Polyvalent Hall, Bucharest; Attendance: 4,500; Referees: Erdoğan, Özdeniz (TUR)
1 November 2015; 19:00	Rodrigues 5	(11–15)	Neagu 9	Polyvalent Hall, Bucharest; Attendance: 4,500; Referees: Erdoğan, Özdeniz (TUR)
1 November 2015; 19:00	3× (yellow card)	Report	3× (yellow card) 3× (suspension)	Polyvalent Hall, Bucharest; Attendance: 4,500; Referees: Erdoğan, Özdeniz (TUR)

6 November 2015; 19:00	IK Sävehof (Sweden)	27–24	(Poland) MKS Selgros Lublin	Partillebohallen, Partille; Attendance: 1,355; Referees: Antić, Jakovljević (SRB)
6 November 2015; 19:00	Eriksson 8	(14–11)	Niedźwiedź 8	Partillebohallen, Partille; Attendance: 1,355; Referees: Antić, Jakovljević (SRB)
6 November 2015; 19:00	3× (yellow card) 3× (suspension)	Report	3× (yellow card) 4× (suspension)	Partillebohallen, Partille; Attendance: 1,355; Referees: Antić, Jakovljević (SRB)

8 November 2015; 19:00	Budućnost (Montenegro)	23–23	(Romania) CSM București	Morača Sports Center, Podgorica; Attendance: 3,500; Referees: Zotin, Volodkov (RUS)
8 November 2015; 19:00	Bulatović 8	(12–13)	Gulldén 7	Morača Sports Center, Podgorica; Attendance: 3,500; Referees: Zotin, Volodkov (RUS)
8 November 2015; 19:00	3× (yellow card)	Report	3× (yellow card) 4× (suspension) 1× (red card)	Morača Sports Center, Podgorica; Attendance: 3,500; Referees: Zotin, Volodkov (RUS)

13 November 2015; 19:00	MKS Selgros Lublin (Poland)	27–30	(Romania) CSM București	Hala Sportowo-Widowiskowa „Globus”, Lublin; Attendance: 1,800; Referees: Tzaferopoulos, Bethmann (GRE)
13 November 2015; 19:00	Niedźwiedź 7	(13–15)	Gulldén 8	Hala Sportowo-Widowiskowa „Globus”, Lublin; Attendance: 1,800; Referees: Tzaferopoulos, Bethmann (GRE)
13 November 2015; 19:00	2× (yellow card) 3× (suspension)	Report	3× (yellow card) 1× (suspension)	Hala Sportowo-Widowiskowa „Globus”, Lublin; Attendance: 1,800; Referees: Tzaferopoulos, Bethmann (GRE)

15 November 2015; 17:00	IK Sävehof (Sweden)	18–25	(Montenegro) Budućnost	Partillebohallen, Partille; Attendance: 860; Referees: Arntsen, Røen (NOR)
15 November 2015; 17:00	Eriksson, Sand 5	(11–14)	Bulatović 6	Partillebohallen, Partille; Attendance: 860; Referees: Arntsen, Røen (NOR)
15 November 2015; 17:00	2× (yellow card) 2× (suspension)	Report	3× (yellow card) 3× (suspension)	Partillebohallen, Partille; Attendance: 860; Referees: Arntsen, Røen (NOR)

20 November 2015; 18:00	CSM București (Romania)	27–22	(Sweden) IK Sävehof	Dinamo Polyvalent Hall, Bucharest; Attendance: 1,800; Referees: Alpaidze, Berezkina (RUS)
20 November 2015; 18:00	Gulldén 6	(13–9)	Ekenman-Fernis 7	Dinamo Polyvalent Hall, Bucharest; Attendance: 1,800; Referees: Alpaidze, Berezkina (RUS)
20 November 2015; 18:00	1× (yellow card) 3× (suspension)	Report	2× (yellow card) 2× (suspension)	Dinamo Polyvalent Hall, Bucharest; Attendance: 1,800; Referees: Alpaidze, Berezkina (RUS)

20 November 2015; 18:00	Budućnost (Montenegro)	29–25	(Poland) MKS Selgros Lublin	Morača Sports Center, Podgorica; Attendance: 1,500; Referees: Rakytina, Tkachuk (UKR)
20 November 2015; 18:00	Bulatović, Neagu 8	(12–13)	Quintino 6	Morača Sports Center, Podgorica; Attendance: 1,500; Referees: Rakytina, Tkachuk (UKR)
20 November 2015; 18:00	3× (yellow card) 3× (suspension)	Report	3× (yellow card) 1× (suspension)	Morača Sports Center, Podgorica; Attendance: 1,500; Referees: Rakytina, Tkachuk (UKR)
