= 2015–16 Women's EHF Champions League main round =

This article describes the main round of the 2015–16 Women's EHF Champions League.

== Qualified teams ==
Group	Winners	Runners-up	Third place
A	(Russia) Rostov-Don	(Norway) Larvik HK	(Romania) HCM Baia Mare
B	(Hungary) FTC-Rail Cargo Hungaria	(France) Fleury Loiret HB	(Germany) Thüringer HC
C	(Hungary) Győri Audi ETO KC	(North Macedonia) Vardar	(Denmark) Midtjylland
D	(Montenegro) Budućnost	(Romania) CSM Bucharest	(Sweden) IK Sävehof

== Format ==
In each group, teams played against each other in a double round-robin format, with home and away matches against teams they did not met before. Points obtained in the group stage were taken over. After completion of the group stage matches, the top four teams of each group advanced to the quarterfinals.

=== Tiebreakers ===
In the group stage, teams are ranked according to points (2 points for a win, 1 point for a draw, 0 points for a loss). After completion of the group stage, if two or more teams have scored the same number of points, the ranking will be determined as follows (article 4.3.1, section II of regulations):

1. Highest number of points in matches between the teams directly involved;
2. Superior goal difference in matches between the teams directly involved;
3. Highest number of goals scored in matches between the teams directly involved (or in the away match in case of a two-team tie);
4. Superior goal difference in all matches of the group;
5. Highest number of plus goals in all matches of the group;
6. If the ranking of one of these teams is determined, the above criteria are consecutively followed until the ranking of all teams is determined. If no ranking can be determined, the following criteria apply:
7. Drawing of lots.

During the group stage, only criteria 1, 4 and 5 apply to determine the provisional ranking of teams.

== Groups ==
=== Group 1 ===
Pos	Team	Pld	W	D	L	GF	GA	GD	Pts	Qualification
1	(Russia) Rostov-Don	10	9	1	0	281	237	+44	19	Advanced to quarterfinals
2	(Norway) Larvik HK	10	6	0	4	281	263	+18	12 (Note: Larvik 64–61 Ferencváros)	Advanced to quarterfinals
3	(Hungary) FTC-Rail Cargo Hungaria	10	5	2	3	282	272	+10	12	Advanced to quarterfinals
4	(Romania) HCM Baia Mare	10	5	0	5	259	247	+12	10	Advanced to quarterfinals
5	(France) Fleury Loiret HB	10	2	2	6	252	287	−35	6	
6	(Germany) Thüringer HC	10	0	1	9	244	297	−53	1	

Source: EHF
Rules for classification: 1) Points; 2) Head-to-head; 3) Goal difference; 4) Goals scored
Notes:

9 January 2016; 16:00	Rostov-Don (Russia)	23–21	(Hungary) FTC-Rail Cargo Hungaria	Rostov-on-Don Palace of Sports, Rostov-on-Don; Attendance: 3,386; Referees: Mitrović, Vešović (MNE)
9 January 2016; 16:00	Ilina 8	(13–11)	Hornyák, Szekerczés 4	Rostov-on-Don Palace of Sports, Rostov-on-Don; Attendance: 3,386; Referees: Mitrović, Vešović (MNE)
9 January 2016; 16:00	3× (yellow card) 3× (suspension) 1× (red card)	Report	3× (yellow card) 1× (suspension)	Rostov-on-Don Palace of Sports, Rostov-on-Don; Attendance: 3,386; Referees: Mitrović, Vešović (MNE)

9 January 2016; 18:30	Larvik HK (Norway)	28–19	(Germany) Thüringer HC	Arena Larvik, Larvik; Attendance: 1,603; Referees: Madsen, Mortensen (DEN)
9 January 2016; 18:30	Hammerseng-Edin, Mørk 5	(14–7)	Buceschi 5	Arena Larvik, Larvik; Attendance: 1,603; Referees: Madsen, Mortensen (DEN)
9 January 2016; 18:30	2× (yellow card) 5× (suspension)	Report	3× (yellow card) 3× (suspension)	Arena Larvik, Larvik; Attendance: 1,603; Referees: Madsen, Mortensen (DEN)

10 January 2016; 18:00	HCM Baia Mare (Romania)	31–28	(France) Fleury Loiret HB	Sala Sporturilor „Lascăr Pană”, Baia Mare; Attendance: 2,200; Referees: Pandžić, Mošorinski (SRB)
10 January 2016; 18:00	Pineau 9	(13–15)	Niombla 9	Sala Sporturilor „Lascăr Pană”, Baia Mare; Attendance: 2,200; Referees: Pandžić, Mošorinski (SRB)
10 January 2016; 18:00	3× (yellow card) 1× (suspension)	Report	3× (yellow card) 4× (suspension) 1× (red card)	Sala Sporturilor „Lascăr Pană”, Baia Mare; Attendance: 2,200; Referees: Pandžić, Mošorinski (SRB)

16 January 2016; 16:00	FTC-Rail Cargo Hungaria (Hungary)	30–27	(Norway) Larvik HK	SYMA Sports and Conference Centre, Budapest; Attendance: 3,000; Referees: Krkacev, Kolevski (MKD)
16 January 2016; 16:00	Pena 9	(19–14)	Mørk 7	SYMA Sports and Conference Centre, Budapest; Attendance: 3,000; Referees: Krkacev, Kolevski (MKD)
16 January 2016; 16:00	3× (yellow card) 6× (suspension)	Report	3× (yellow card) 1× (suspension)	SYMA Sports and Conference Centre, Budapest; Attendance: 3,000; Referees: Krkacev, Kolevski (MKD)

16 January 2016; 17:00	Thüringer HC (Germany)	23–25	(Romania) HCM Baia Mare	Wiedigsburghalle, Nordhausen; Attendance: 1,500; Referees: Brehmer, Skowronek (POL)
16 January 2016; 17:00	Buceschi 7	(12–10)	Do Nascimento 7	Wiedigsburghalle, Nordhausen; Attendance: 1,500; Referees: Brehmer, Skowronek (POL)
16 January 2016; 17:00	2× (yellow card) 2× (suspension)	Report	3× (yellow card) 1× (suspension)	Wiedigsburghalle, Nordhausen; Attendance: 1,500; Referees: Brehmer, Skowronek (POL)

17 January 2016; 16:15	Fleury Loiret HB (France)	22–27	(Russia) Rostov-Don	Palais des Sports, Orléans; Attendance: 2,100; Referees: Mandák, Rudinský (SVK)
17 January 2016; 16:15	Niombla 8	(13–10)	Shymkute 6	Palais des Sports, Orléans; Attendance: 2,100; Referees: Mandák, Rudinský (SVK)
17 January 2016; 16:15	2× (yellow card) 1× (suspension)	Report	3× (yellow card) 3× (suspension)	Palais des Sports, Orléans; Attendance: 2,100; Referees: Mandák, Rudinský (SVK)

5 February 2016; 20:00	HCM Baia Mare (Romania)	32–24	(Hungary) FTC-Rail Cargo Hungaria	Sala Sporturilor „Lascăr Pană”, Baia Mare; Attendance: 2,300; Referees: Tzaferopoulos, Bethmann (GRE)
5 February 2016; 20:00	Pineau 10	(16–14)	Pena 9	Sala Sporturilor „Lascăr Pană”, Baia Mare; Attendance: 2,300; Referees: Tzaferopoulos, Bethmann (GRE)
5 February 2016; 20:00	3× (yellow card) 1× (suspension)	Report	3× (yellow card) 1× (suspension)	Sala Sporturilor „Lascăr Pană”, Baia Mare; Attendance: 2,300; Referees: Tzaferopoulos, Bethmann (GRE)

6 February 2016; 17:00	Rostov-Don (Russia)	30–24	(Germany) Thüringer HC	Rostov-on-Don Palace of Sports, Rostov-on-Don; Attendance: 3,250; Referees: Marić, Mašić (SRB)
6 February 2016; 17:00	Ilina 10	(15–7)	Snelder 4	Rostov-on-Don Palace of Sports, Rostov-on-Don; Attendance: 3,250; Referees: Marić, Mašić (SRB)
6 February 2016; 17:00	3× (yellow card) 4× (suspension)	Report	2× (yellow card) 2× (suspension)	Rostov-on-Don Palace of Sports, Rostov-on-Don; Attendance: 3,250; Referees: Marić, Mašić (SRB)

6 February 2016; 18:30	Larvik HK (Norway)	26–31	(France) Fleury Loiret HB	Arena Larvik, Larvik; Attendance: 2,137; Referees: Vujačić, Kažanegra (MNE)
6 February 2016; 18:30	Mørk 12	(14–15)	Barbosa 9	Arena Larvik, Larvik; Attendance: 2,137; Referees: Vujačić, Kažanegra (MNE)
6 February 2016; 18:30	3× (yellow card) 1× (suspension)	Report	2× (yellow card) 3× (suspension)	Arena Larvik, Larvik; Attendance: 2,137; Referees: Vujačić, Kažanegra (MNE)

13 February 2016; 15:00	FTC-Rail Cargo Hungaria (Hungary)	29–29	(Russia) Rostov-Don	SYMA Sports and Conference Centre, Budapest; Attendance: 3,000; Referees: Jurinović, Mrvica (CRO)
13 February 2016; 15:00	Szekerczés, Zácsik 6	(15–13)	Ilina 9	SYMA Sports and Conference Centre, Budapest; Attendance: 3,000; Referees: Jurinović, Mrvica (CRO)
13 February 2016; 15:00	2× (yellow card) 4× (suspension)	Report	3× (yellow card) 3× (suspension)	SYMA Sports and Conference Centre, Budapest; Attendance: 3,000; Referees: Jurinović, Mrvica (CRO)

14 February 2016; 14:00	Thüringer HC (Germany)	20–28	(Norway) Larvik HK	Wiedigsburghalle, Nordhausen; Attendance: 1,900; Referees: Kurtagic, Wetterwik (SWE)
14 February 2016; 14:00	Huber 5	(11–13)	Mørk 9	Wiedigsburghalle, Nordhausen; Attendance: 1,900; Referees: Kurtagic, Wetterwik (SWE)
14 February 2016; 14:00	3× (yellow card) 2× (suspension)	Report	2× (yellow card) 6× (suspension)	Wiedigsburghalle, Nordhausen; Attendance: 1,900; Referees: Kurtagic, Wetterwik (SWE)

14 February 2016; 19:00	Fleury Loiret HB (France)	17–18	(Romania) HCM Baia Mare	Palais des Sports, Orléans; Attendance: 2,300; Referees: Opava, Válek (CZE)
14 February 2016; 19:00	Houette 7	(8–8)	Abbingh 6	Palais des Sports, Orléans; Attendance: 2,300; Referees: Opava, Válek (CZE)
14 February 2016; 19:00	3× (yellow card) 2× (suspension)	Report	3× (yellow card) 2× (suspension)	Palais des Sports, Orléans; Attendance: 2,300; Referees: Opava, Válek (CZE)

19 February 2016; 18:00	HCM Baia Mare (Romania)	38–27	(Germany) Thüringer HC	Sala Sporturilor „Lascăr Pană”, Baia Mare; Attendance: 2,080; Referees: Krkacev, Kolevski (MKD)
19 February 2016; 18:00	Do Nascimento 9	(19–12)	Schmelzer 6	Sala Sporturilor „Lascăr Pană”, Baia Mare; Attendance: 2,080; Referees: Krkacev, Kolevski (MKD)
19 February 2016; 18:00	3× (yellow card) 1× (suspension)	Report	3× (yellow card) 4× (suspension)	Sala Sporturilor „Lascăr Pană”, Baia Mare; Attendance: 2,080; Referees: Krkacev, Kolevski (MKD)

20 February 2016; 17:00	Rostov-Don (Russia)	38–21	(France) Fleury Loiret HB	Rostov-on-Don Palace of Sports, Rostov-on-Don; Attendance: 2,800; Referees: Leszczynski, Piechota (POL)
20 February 2016; 17:00	Ilina 9	(21–12)	Agathe 5	Rostov-on-Don Palace of Sports, Rostov-on-Don; Attendance: 2,800; Referees: Leszczynski, Piechota (POL)
20 February 2016; 17:00	3× (yellow card) 2× (suspension)	Report	3× (yellow card) 1× (suspension)	Rostov-on-Don Palace of Sports, Rostov-on-Don; Attendance: 2,800; Referees: Leszczynski, Piechota (POL)

20 February 2016; 19:00	Larvik HK (Norway)	37–31	(Hungary) FTC-Rail Cargo Hungaria	Arena Larvik, Larvik; Attendance: 2,817; Referees: Covalciuc, Covalciuc (MDA)
20 February 2016; 19:00	Mørk 10	(20–15)	Pena 7	Arena Larvik, Larvik; Attendance: 2,817; Referees: Covalciuc, Covalciuc (MDA)
20 February 2016; 19:00	3× (yellow card) 3× (suspension)	Report	3× (yellow card) 3× (suspension)	Arena Larvik, Larvik; Attendance: 2,817; Referees: Covalciuc, Covalciuc (MDA)

27 February 2016; 14:30	FTC-Rail Cargo Hungaria (Hungary)	21–18	(Romania) HCM Baia Mare	SYMA Sports and Conference Centre, Budapest; Attendance: 3,000; Referees: Christiansen, Hansen (DEN)
27 February 2016; 14:30	Pena 7	(14–7)	Do Nascimento 8	SYMA Sports and Conference Centre, Budapest; Attendance: 3,000; Referees: Christiansen, Hansen (DEN)
27 February 2016; 14:30	3× (yellow card) 6× (suspension)	Report	3× (yellow card) 3× (suspension)	SYMA Sports and Conference Centre, Budapest; Attendance: 3,000; Referees: Christiansen, Hansen (DEN)

28 February 2016; 14:00	Thüringer HC (Germany)	28–32	(Russia) Rostov-Don	Wiedigsburghalle, Nordhausen; Attendance: 1,700; Referees: Lah, Sok (SLO)
28 February 2016; 14:00	Buceschi 8	(14–15)	Ilina 8	Wiedigsburghalle, Nordhausen; Attendance: 1,700; Referees: Lah, Sok (SLO)
28 February 2016; 14:00	3× (yellow card) 4× (suspension)	Report	3× (yellow card) 3× (suspension)	Wiedigsburghalle, Nordhausen; Attendance: 1,700; Referees: Lah, Sok (SLO)

28 February 2016; 15:15	Fleury Loiret HB (France)	28–31	(Norway) Larvik HK	Palais des Sports, Orléans; Attendance: 2,000; Referees: Alpaidze, Berezkina (RUS)
28 February 2016; 15:15	Barbosa 6	(16–15)	Mørk 10	Palais des Sports, Orléans; Attendance: 2,000; Referees: Alpaidze, Berezkina (RUS)
28 February 2016; 15:15	3× (yellow card) 2× (suspension)	Report	3× (yellow card) 4× (suspension)	Palais des Sports, Orléans; Attendance: 2,000; Referees: Alpaidze, Berezkina (RUS)

=== Group 2 ===
Pos	Team	Pld	W	D	L	GF	GA	GD	Pts	Qualification
1	(Montenegro) Budućnost	10	7	1	2	264	213	+51	15 (Note: Budućnost 45–44 Győr)	Advanced to quarterfinals
2	(Hungary) Győri Audi ETO KC	10	7	1	2	252	230	+22	15	Advanced to quarterfinals
3	(North Macedonia) Vardar	10	7	0	3	269	246	+23	14	Advanced to quarterfinals
4	(Romania) CSM București	10	4	1	5	242	239	+3	9	Advanced to quarterfinals
5	(Denmark) Midtjylland	10	2	1	7	220	261	−41	5	
6	(Sweden) IK Sävehof	10	1	0	9	225	286	−61	2	

Source: EHF
Rules for classification: 1) Points; 2) Head-to-head; 3) Goal difference; 4) Goals scored
Notes:

9 January 2016; 16:00	Győri Audi ETO KC (Hungary)	22–20	(Montenegro) Budućnost	Audi Aréna, Győr; Attendance: 5,220; Referees: Schulze, Tönnies (GER)
9 January 2016; 16:00	Sulland 6	(13–11)	Bulatović, Neagu 4	Audi Aréna, Győr; Attendance: 5,220; Referees: Schulze, Tönnies (GER)
9 January 2016; 16:00	3× (yellow card) 5× (suspension)	Report	3× (yellow card) 4× (suspension)	Audi Aréna, Győr; Attendance: 5,220; Referees: Schulze, Tönnies (GER)

9 January 2016; 17:30	Vardar (North Macedonia)	22–21	(Romania) CSM București	Jane Sandanski Arena, Skopje; Attendance: 2,000; Referees: Kijauskaitė, Žalienė (LTU)
9 January 2016; 17:30	Lekić 5	(11–11)	Gulldén 8	Jane Sandanski Arena, Skopje; Attendance: 2,000; Referees: Kijauskaitė, Žalienė (LTU)
9 January 2016; 17:30	2× (yellow card) 4× (suspension)	Report	2× (yellow card) 1× (suspension)	Jane Sandanski Arena, Skopje; Attendance: 2,000; Referees: Kijauskaitė, Žalienė (LTU)

10 January 2016; 17:00	Midtjylland (Denmark)	25–21	(Sweden) IK Sävehof	Ikast-Brande Arena, Ikast; Attendance: 1,105; Referees: Arntsen, Røen (NOR)
10 January 2016; 17:00	Ahlm 7	(15–9)	Lindvall-Haggren 5	Ikast-Brande Arena, Ikast; Attendance: 1,105; Referees: Arntsen, Røen (NOR)
10 January 2016; 17:00	3× (yellow card) 3× (suspension)	Report	3× (yellow card) 5× (suspension)	Ikast-Brande Arena, Ikast; Attendance: 1,105; Referees: Arntsen, Røen (NOR)

15 January 2016; 20:00	CSM Bucharest (Romania)	24–22	(Denmark) Midtjylland	Polyvalent Hall, Bucharest; Attendance: 3,845; Referees: Jurinović, Mrvica (CRO)
15 January 2016; 20:00	Gulldén 9	(10–12)	Ahlm 7	Polyvalent Hall, Bucharest; Attendance: 3,845; Referees: Jurinović, Mrvica (CRO)
15 January 2016; 20:00	3× (yellow card) 1× (suspension)	Report	2× (yellow card) 2× (suspension)	Polyvalent Hall, Bucharest; Attendance: 3,845; Referees: Jurinović, Mrvica (CRO)

17 January 2016; 16:00	Budućnost (Montenegro)	31–19	(North Macedonia) Vardar	Morača Sports Center, Podgorica; Attendance: 4,500; Referees: Bonaventura, Bonaventura (FRA)
17 January 2016; 16:00	Cvijić 7	(16–8)	Sokač 5	Morača Sports Center, Podgorica; Attendance: 4,500; Referees: Bonaventura, Bonaventura (FRA)
17 January 2016; 16:00	3× (yellow card) 5× (suspension)	Report	3× (yellow card) 3× (suspension)	Morača Sports Center, Podgorica; Attendance: 4,500; Referees: Bonaventura, Bonaventura (FRA)

17 January 2016; 16:15	IK Sävehof (Sweden)	18–26	(Hungary) Győri Audi ETO KC	Partillebohallen, Partille; Attendance: 821; Referees: Alpaidze, Berezkina (RUS)
17 January 2016; 16:15	Ekenman-Fernis 4	(6–13)	Groot 6	Partillebohallen, Partille; Attendance: 821; Referees: Alpaidze, Berezkina (RUS)
17 January 2016; 16:15	2× (yellow card) 4× (suspension)	Report	2× (yellow card) 2× (suspension)	Partillebohallen, Partille; Attendance: 821; Referees: Alpaidze, Berezkina (RUS)

6 February 2016; 17:00	Győri Audi ETO KC (Hungary)	28–22	(Romania) CSM București	Audi Aréna, Győr; Attendance: 5,000; Referees: Pandžić, Mošorinski (SRB)
6 February 2016; 17:00	Groot 6	(12–10)	Gulldén 8	Audi Aréna, Győr; Attendance: 5,000; Referees: Pandžić, Mošorinski (SRB)
6 February 2016; 17:00	3× (yellow card) 2× (suspension)	Report	2× (yellow card) 2× (suspension)	Audi Aréna, Győr; Attendance: 5,000; Referees: Pandžić, Mošorinski (SRB)

6 February 2016; 17:30	Vardar (North Macedonia)	37–25	(Sweden) IK Sävehof	Jane Sandanski Arena, Skopje; Attendance: 2,500; Referees: Panayides, Andreou (CYP)
6 February 2016; 17:30	Lekić, Penezić 6	(19–10)	Eriksson 7	Jane Sandanski Arena, Skopje; Attendance: 2,500; Referees: Panayides, Andreou (CYP)
6 February 2016; 17:30	3× (yellow card) 4× (suspension)	Report	3× (yellow card) 2× (suspension)	Jane Sandanski Arena, Skopje; Attendance: 2,500; Referees: Panayides, Andreou (CYP)

7 February 2016; 17:00	Midtjylland (Denmark)	18–28	(Montenegro) Budućnost	Ikast-Brande Arena, Ikast; Attendance: 1,532; Referees: Mandák, Rudinský (SVK)
7 February 2016; 17:00	Ahlm 5	(9–13)	Bulatović, Neagu 7	Ikast-Brande Arena, Ikast; Attendance: 1,532; Referees: Mandák, Rudinský (SVK)
7 February 2016; 17:00	3× (yellow card) 3× (suspension)	Report	3× (yellow card) 3× (suspension) 1× (red card)	Ikast-Brande Arena, Ikast; Attendance: 1,532; Referees: Mandák, Rudinský (SVK)

12 February 2016; 19:00	IK Sävehof (Sweden)	32–24	(Denmark) Midtjylland	Partillebohallen, Partille; Attendance: 619; Referees: Praštalo, Todorović (BIH)
12 February 2016; 19:00	Eriksson 10	(17–11)	Ahlm 6	Partillebohallen, Partille; Attendance: 619; Referees: Praštalo, Todorović (BIH)
12 February 2016; 19:00	3× (yellow card) 6× (suspension)	Report	3× (yellow card) 1× (suspension)	Partillebohallen, Partille; Attendance: 619; Referees: Praštalo, Todorović (BIH)

14 February 2016; 19:00	Budućnost (Montenegro)	25–22	(Hungary) Győri Audi ETO KC	Morača Sports Center, Podgorica; Attendance: 5,000; Referees: Arntsen, Røen (NOR)
14 February 2016; 19:00	Cvijić 6	(12–12)	Amorim 7	Morača Sports Center, Podgorica; Attendance: 5,000; Referees: Arntsen, Røen (NOR)
14 February 2016; 19:00	3× (yellow card) 5× (suspension)	Report	3× (yellow card) 3× (suspension)	Morača Sports Center, Podgorica; Attendance: 5,000; Referees: Arntsen, Røen (NOR)

16 February 2016; 19:00	CSM București (Romania)	25–30	(North Macedonia) Vardar	Polyvalent Hall, Bucharest; Attendance: 4,600; Referees: Brunovsky, Čanda (SVK)
16 February 2016; 19:00	Martín 6	(11–17)	Lekić 9	Polyvalent Hall, Bucharest; Attendance: 4,600; Referees: Brunovsky, Čanda (SVK)
16 February 2016; 19:00	3× (yellow card) 2× (suspension)	Report	1× (yellow card) 4× (suspension)	Polyvalent Hall, Bucharest; Attendance: 4,600; Referees: Brunovsky, Čanda (SVK)

19 February 2016; 19:00	Győri Audi ETO KC (Hungary)	32–26	(Sweden) IK Sävehof	Audi Aréna, Győr; Attendance: 4,534; Referees: Kijauskaitė, Žalienė (LTU)
19 February 2016; 19:00	Alstad, Groot 6	(19–14)	Eriksson 7	Audi Aréna, Győr; Attendance: 4,534; Referees: Kijauskaitė, Žalienė (LTU)
19 February 2016; 19:00	3× (yellow card) 1× (suspension)	Report	3× (yellow card) 3× (suspension)	Audi Aréna, Győr; Attendance: 4,534; Referees: Kijauskaitė, Žalienė (LTU)

21 February 2016; 15:10	Midtjylland (Denmark)	23–28	(Romania) CSM București	Ikast-Brande Arena, Ikast; Attendance: 2,246; Referees: Brehmer, Skowronek (POL)
21 February 2016; 15:10	S. Jørgensen 7	(12–12)	Gulldén 8	Ikast-Brande Arena, Ikast; Attendance: 2,246; Referees: Brehmer, Skowronek (POL)
21 February 2016; 15:10	3× (yellow card) 2× (suspension)	Report	2× (yellow card) 1× (suspension)	Ikast-Brande Arena, Ikast; Attendance: 2,246; Referees: Brehmer, Skowronek (POL)

21 February 2016; 17:30	Vardar (North Macedonia)	26–24	(Montenegro) Budućnost	Jane Sandanski Arena, Skopje; Attendance: 4,000; Referees: Brkic, Jusufhodzic (AUT)
21 February 2016; 17:30	Lazović 6	(11–11)	Bulatović 6	Jane Sandanski Arena, Skopje; Attendance: 4,000; Referees: Brkic, Jusufhodzic (AUT)
21 February 2016; 17:30	3× (yellow card) 1× (suspension)	Report	3× (yellow card) 2× (suspension)	Jane Sandanski Arena, Skopje; Attendance: 4,000; Referees: Brkic, Jusufhodzic (AUT)

26 February 2016; 19:00	IK Sävehof (Sweden)	26–29	(North Macedonia) Vardar	Partillebohallen, Partille; Attendance: 848; Referees: Tzaferopoulos, Bethmann (GRE)
26 February 2016; 19:00	Sand 6	(14–14)	Zebić 7	Partillebohallen, Partille; Attendance: 848; Referees: Tzaferopoulos, Bethmann (GRE)
26 February 2016; 19:00	3× (yellow card) 4× (suspension)	Report	2× (yellow card) 6× (suspension)	Partillebohallen, Partille; Attendance: 848; Referees: Tzaferopoulos, Bethmann (GRE)

28 February 2016; 16:00	CSM Bucharest (Romania)	22–24	(Hungary) Győri Audi ETO KC	Polyvalent Hall, Bucharest; Attendance: 4,000; Referees: Bonaventura, Bonaventura (FRA)
28 February 2016; 16:00	Gulldén 8	(8–14)	Løke, Sulland 5	Polyvalent Hall, Bucharest; Attendance: 4,000; Referees: Bonaventura, Bonaventura (FRA)
28 February 2016; 16:00	3× (yellow card) 2× (suspension)	Report	3× (yellow card) 6× (suspension)	Polyvalent Hall, Bucharest; Attendance: 4,000; Referees: Bonaventura, Bonaventura (FRA)

28 February 2016; 17:00	Budućnost (Montenegro)	27–21	(Denmark) Midtjylland	Morača Sports Center, Podgorica; Attendance: 3,600; Referees: Mažeika, Gatelis (LTU)
28 February 2016; 17:00	Cvijić 5	(14–7)	Ahlm 5	Morača Sports Center, Podgorica; Attendance: 3,600; Referees: Mažeika, Gatelis (LTU)
28 February 2016; 17:00	3× (yellow card) 4× (suspension)	Report	3× (yellow card) 1× (suspension)	Morača Sports Center, Podgorica; Attendance: 3,600; Referees: Mažeika, Gatelis (LTU)
