= 2015–16 Women's EHF Champions League knockout stage =

This article describes the knockout stage of the 2015–16 Women's EHF Champions League.

== Qualified teams ==
The top four placed teams from each of the two main round groups advanced to the knockout stage.

Group	First place	Second place	Third place	Fourth place
1	(Russia) Rostov-Don	(Norway) Larvik HK	(Hungary) FTC-Rail Cargo Hungaria	(Romania) HCM Baia Mare
2	(Montenegro) Budućnost	(Hungary) Győri Audi ETO KC	(North Macedonia) Vardar	(Romania) CSM București

== Format ==
The first-placed team of each group faced the fourth-placed team, and the second-placed team played against the third-placed team from the other group. After that a draw was held to determine the pairings for the final four.

== Quarterfinals ==
Team 1	Agg.	Team 2	1st leg	2nd leg
CSM București (Romania)	55–53	(Russia) Rostov-Don	26–25	29–28
Vardar (North Macedonia)	60–48	(Norway) Larvik HK	34–20	26–28
FTC-Rail Cargo Hungaria (Hungary)	41–71	(Hungary) Győri Audi ETO KC	18–31	23–40
HCM Baia Mare (Romania)	49–61	(Montenegro) Budućnost	24–29	25–32

=== Matches ===
31 March 2016; 19:00	CSM București (Romania)	26–25	(Russia) Rostov-Don	Polyvalent Hall, Bucharest; Attendance: 4,500; Referees: Pavićević, Ražnatović (MNE)
31 March 2016; 19:00	Martín, Torstenson 5	(11–12)	Ilina 9	Polyvalent Hall, Bucharest; Attendance: 4,500; Referees: Pavićević, Ražnatović (MNE)
31 March 2016; 19:00	3× (yellow card) 1× (suspension)	Report	3× (yellow card) 2× (suspension)	Polyvalent Hall, Bucharest; Attendance: 4,500; Referees: Pavićević, Ražnatović (MNE)

9 April 2016; 17:00	Rostov-Don (Russia)	28–29	(Romania) CSM București	Rostov-on-Don Palace of Sports, Rostov-on-Don; Attendance: 3,400; Referees: Krkacev, Kolevski (MKD)
9 April 2016; 17:00	Ilina 8	(11–16)	Rodrigues 7	Rostov-on-Don Palace of Sports, Rostov-on-Don; Attendance: 3,400; Referees: Krkacev, Kolevski (MKD)
9 April 2016; 17:00	3× (yellow card) 1× (suspension)	Report	3× (yellow card) 4× (suspension)	Rostov-on-Don Palace of Sports, Rostov-on-Don; Attendance: 3,400; Referees: Krkacev, Kolevski (MKD)

CSM București won 55–53 on aggregate.

2 April 2016; 14:00	HCM Baia Mare (Romania)	24–29	(Montenegro) Budućnost	Sala Sporturilor „Lascăr Pană”, Baia Mare; Attendance: 2,000; Referees: Jurinović, Mrvica (CRO)
2 April 2016; 14:00	Pineau 7	(10–17)	Neagu 8	Sala Sporturilor „Lascăr Pană”, Baia Mare; Attendance: 2,000; Referees: Jurinović, Mrvica (CRO)
2 April 2016; 14:00	2× (yellow card) 1× (suspension)	Report	3× (yellow card) 1× (suspension)	Sala Sporturilor „Lascăr Pană”, Baia Mare; Attendance: 2,000; Referees: Jurinović, Mrvica (CRO)

10 April 2016; 19:00	Budućnost (Montenegro)	32–25	(Romania) HCM Baia Mare	Morača Sports Center, Podgorica; Attendance: 3,500; Referees: Opava, Válek (CZE)
10 April 2016; 19:00	Neagu 10	(13–14)	Abbingh, Vizitiu 5	Morača Sports Center, Podgorica; Attendance: 3,500; Referees: Opava, Válek (CZE)
10 April 2016; 19:00	3× (yellow card) 4× (suspension)	Report	3× (yellow card) 1× (suspension)	Morača Sports Center, Podgorica; Attendance: 3,500; Referees: Opava, Válek (CZE)

Budućnost won 61–49 on aggregate.

2 April 2016; 15:00	FTC-Rail Cargo Hungaria (Hungary)	18–31	(Hungary) Győri Audi ETO KC	OBO Aréna, Dabas; Attendance: 2,498; Referees: Madsen, Mortensen (DEN)
2 April 2016; 15:00	Pena, Szucsánszki 4	(12–17)	Amorim, Løke 6	OBO Aréna, Dabas; Attendance: 2,498; Referees: Madsen, Mortensen (DEN)
2 April 2016; 15:00	3× (yellow card) 5× (suspension)	Report	3× (yellow card) 2× (suspension)	OBO Aréna, Dabas; Attendance: 2,498; Referees: Madsen, Mortensen (DEN)

9 April 2016; 17:00	Győri Audi ETO KC (Hungary)	40–23	(Hungary) FTC-Rail Cargo Hungaria	Audi Aréna, Győr; Attendance: 5,027; Referees: Alpaidze, Berezkina (RUS)
9 April 2016; 17:00	Løke 7	(22–10)	Hornyák 6	Audi Aréna, Győr; Attendance: 5,027; Referees: Alpaidze, Berezkina (RUS)
9 April 2016; 17:00	3× (yellow card) 4× (suspension)	Report	3× (yellow card) 7× (suspension)	Audi Aréna, Győr; Attendance: 5,027; Referees: Alpaidze, Berezkina (RUS)

Győri ETO won 71–41 on aggregate.

2 April 2016; 17:30	Vardar (North Macedonia)	34–20	(Norway) Larvik HK	Jane Sandanski Arena, Skopje; Attendance: 3,500; Referees: Florescu, Stoia (ROU)
2 April 2016; 17:30	Penezić 8	(16–9)	N. Mørk 6	Jane Sandanski Arena, Skopje; Attendance: 3,500; Referees: Florescu, Stoia (ROU)
2 April 2016; 17:30	3× (yellow card) 4× (suspension)	Report	3× (yellow card) 2× (suspension)	Jane Sandanski Arena, Skopje; Attendance: 3,500; Referees: Florescu, Stoia (ROU)

10 April 2016; 15:30	Larvik HK (Norway)	28–26	(North Macedonia) Vardar	Arena Larvik, Larvik; Attendance: 3,000; Referees: Erdoğan, Özdeniz (TUR)
10 April 2016; 15:30	T. Mørk 7	(11–13)	Radičević 7	Arena Larvik, Larvik; Attendance: 3,000; Referees: Erdoğan, Özdeniz (TUR)
10 April 2016; 15:30	3× (yellow card) 2× (suspension)	Report	3× (yellow card) 4× (suspension) 1× (red card)	Arena Larvik, Larvik; Attendance: 3,000; Referees: Erdoğan, Özdeniz (TUR)

Vardar won 60–48 on aggregate.

== Final four ==
The final four was held at the László Papp Budapest Sports Arena in Budapest, Hungary on 7 and 8 May 2016. The draw was held on 15 April 2016 at 11:30.

=== Bracket ===
Semifinals
7 May
(Romania) CSM București	27
(North Macedonia) Vardar	21
7 May
(Montenegro) Budućnost	20
(Hungary) Győri Audi ETO KC	21

Final
8 May
(Romania) CSM București (Pen.)	29
(Hungary) Győri Audi ETO KC	26
Third place
8 May
(North Macedonia) Vardar	30
(Montenegro) Budućnost	28

=== Semifinals ===
7 May 2016; 15:15	Budućnost (Montenegro)	20–21	(Hungary) Győri Audi ETO KC	László Papp Budapest Sports Arena, Budapest; Attendance: 11,000; Referees: Brkic, Jusufhodzic (AUT)
7 May 2016; 15:15	Neagu 6	(8–11)	three players 4	László Papp Budapest Sports Arena, Budapest; Attendance: 11,000; Referees: Brkic, Jusufhodzic (AUT)
7 May 2016; 15:15	4× (yellow card) 4× (suspension)	Report	3× (yellow card) 4× (suspension)	László Papp Budapest Sports Arena, Budapest; Attendance: 11,000; Referees: Brkic, Jusufhodzic (AUT)

7 May 2016; 17:45	CSM București (Romania)	27–21	(North Macedonia) Vardar	László Papp Budapest Sports Arena, Budapest; Attendance: 12,000; Referees: Brehmer, Skowronek (POL)
7 May 2016; 17:45	Rodrigues 5	(14–9)	Lekić 6	László Papp Budapest Sports Arena, Budapest; Attendance: 12,000; Referees: Brehmer, Skowronek (POL)
7 May 2016; 17:45	3× (yellow card) 3× (suspension)	Report	3× (yellow card) 2× (suspension)	László Papp Budapest Sports Arena, Budapest; Attendance: 12,000; Referees: Brehmer, Skowronek (POL)

=== Third place game ===
8 May 2016; 15:15	Vardar (North Macedonia)	30–28	(Montenegro) Budućnost	László Papp Budapest Sports Arena, Budapest; Attendance: 11,000; Referees: Christiansen, Hansen (DEN)
8 May 2016; 15:15	Penezić 7	(14–16)	Neagu 8	László Papp Budapest Sports Arena, Budapest; Attendance: 11,000; Referees: Christiansen, Hansen (DEN)
8 May 2016; 15:15	3× (yellow card) 1× (suspension)	Report	3× (yellow card) 4× (suspension)	László Papp Budapest Sports Arena, Budapest; Attendance: 11,000; Referees: Christiansen, Hansen (DEN)

=== Final ===
8 May 2016
17:45
CSM București (Romania)
29–26 (ET)
(Hungary) Győri Audi ETO KC
László Papp Budapest Sports Arena, Budapest
Attendance: 12,000
Referees: Arntsen, Røen (NOR)
Gulldén 15
(13–12)
Løke 8
4× (yellow card) 2× (suspension)
Report
3× (yellow card) 3× (suspension)

FT: 22–22 ET: 3–3 Pen: 4–1
