= 2015–16 Women's EHF Champions League =

23rd edition of Women's European Handball Federation Champions League

Women's EHF Champions League
- 2015–16

Tournament information
- Sport: Handball
- Dates: 12 September 2015–8 May 2016
- Teams: 22

Final positions
- Champions: (Romania) CSM București
- Runner-up: (Hungary) Győri Audi ETO KC

Tournament statistics
- Matches played: 96
- Goals scored: 5017 (52.26 per match)
- Attendance: 281,616 (2,934 per match)
- Top scorer(s): (Sweden) Isabelle Gulldén (108 goals)

The 2015–16 Women's EHF Champions League was the 23rd edition of the Women's EHF Champions League, the competition for top women's clubs of Europe, organized and supervised by the European Handball Federation.

CSM București won the trophy in their European debut season by defeating Győri Audi ETO KC 29–26 in the big final.

== Overview ==
=== Team allocation ===
14 teams were directly qualified for the group stage.

Group stage
(Austria) Hypo Niederösterreich (1st)	(Croatia) Podravka Koprivnica (1st)	(Denmark) Midtjylland (1st)	(France) Fleury Loiret HB (1st)
(Germany) Thüringer HC (1st)	(Hungary) FTC-Rail Cargo Hungaria (1st)	(North Macedonia) Vardar (1st)	(Montenegro) Budućnost (1st)^{TH} (1st)
(Norway) Larvik HK (1st)	(Poland) MKS Selgros Lublin (1st)	(Romania) CSM București (1st)	(Russia) Rostov-Don (1st)
(Slovenia) Krim (1st)	(Sweden) IK Sävehof (1st)		
Qualification tournament
(Belarus) BNTU Minsk (1st)	(Denmark) Team Esbjerg (2nd)	(Hungary) Győri Audi ETO KC (2nd)	(Netherlands) SERCODAK Dalfsen (1st)
(Norway) Glassverket IF (2nd)	(Romania) HCM Baia Mare (2nd)	(Serbia) RK Radnički Kragujevac (1st)	(Turkey) Yenimahalle Bld. SK (1st)

- ^{TH = Title holders}

=== Round and draw dates ===
All draws held at the European Handball Federation headquarters in Vienna, Austria.

Phase	Draw date
Qualifying	26 June 2015
Group stage	26 June 2015
Knockout stage	26 June 2015
Final Four	12 April 2016

== Qualification stage ==
The draw was held on 26 June 2015. The teams played a semifinal and final to determine the last participants. Matches were played on 12 and 13 September 2015.

=== Seedings ===
The seedings were announced on 23 June 2015.

Pot 1	Pot 2	Pot 3	Pot 4
(Hungary) Győri Audi ETO KC (Denmark) Team Esbjerg	(Norway) Glassverket IF (Romania) HCM Baia Mare	(Belarus) BNTU Minsk (Netherlands) SERCODAK Dalfsen	(Serbia) RK Radnički Kragujevac (Turkey) Yenimahalle Bld. SK

=== Qualification tournament 1 ===
Semifinals
12 September
(Hungary) Győri Audi ETO KC	42
(Serbia) Kragujevac	13
12 September
(Norway) Glassverket IF	26
(Netherlands) SERCODAK Dalfsen	21

Final
13 September
(Hungary) Győri Audi ETO KC	30
(Norway) Glassverket IF	21
Third place
13 September
(Serbia) Kragujevac	17
(Netherlands) SERCODAK Dalfsen	23

=== Qualification tournament 2 ===
Semifinals
12 September
(Denmark) Team Esbjerg	32
(Turkey) Yenimahalle Bld. SK	28
12 September
(Romania) HCM Baia Mare	31
(Belarus) BNTU Minsk	21

Final
13 September
(Denmark) Team Esbjerg	21
(Romania) HCM Baia Mare	32
Third place
13 September
(Turkey) Yenimahalle Bld. SK	27
(Belarus) BNTU Minsk	31

== Group stage ==
The draw was held on 26 June 2015.

=== Group A ===
Pos	Team	Pld	W	D	L	GF	GA	GD	Pts	Qualification	ROS	LAR	HCM	KRI
1	(Russia) Rostov-Don	6	6	0	0	173	148	+25	12	Advanced to main round	—	26–25	27–26	35–25
2	(Norway) Larvik HK	6	4	0	2	173	153	+20	8	Advanced to main round	21–27	—	27–22	32–28
3	(Romania) HCM Baia Mare	6	2	0	4	165	162	+3	4	Advanced to main round	20–22	29–31	—	35–28
4	(Slovenia) Krim	6	0	0	6	160	208	−48	0		31–36	21–37	27–33	—

Source: EHF
Rules for classification: 1) Points; 2) Head-to-head; 3) Goal difference; 4) Goals scored

=== Group B ===
Pos	Team	Pld	W	D	L	GF	GA	GD	Pts	Qualification	FER	FLE	THÜ	KOP
1	(Hungary) FTC-Rail Cargo Hungaria	6	5	1	0	181	146	+35	11	Advanced to main round	—	36–23	32–28	28–16
2	(France) Fleury Loiret HB	6	2	3	1	144	149	−5	7	Advanced to main round	28–28	—	27–21	19–17
3	(Germany) Thüringer HC	6	2	1	3	159	156	+3	5	Advanced to main round	27–30	27–27	—	29–19
4	(Croatia) Podravka Koprivnica	6	0	1	5	117	150	−33	1		24–27	20–20	21–27	—

Source: EHF
Rules for classification: 1) Points; 2) Head-to-head; 3) Goal difference; 4) Goals scored

=== Group C ===
Pos	Team	Pld	W	D	L	GF	GA	GD	Pts	Qualification	GYO	VAR	MID	NIE
1	(Hungary) Győri Audi ETO KC	6	4	1	1	164	134	+30	9	Advanced to main round	—	28–27	21–26	37–16
2	(North Macedonia) Vardar	6	4	0	2	182	144	+38	8	Advanced to main round	22–27	—	33–24	37–25
3	(Denmark) Midtjylland	6	3	1	2	153	149	+4	7	Advanced to main round	22–22	15–25	—	33–21
4	(Austria) Hypo Niederösterreich	6	0	0	6	135	207	−72	0		21–29	25–38	27–33	—

Source: EHF
Rules for classification: 1) Points; 2) Head-to-head; 3) Goal difference; 4) Goals scored

=== Group D ===
Pos	Team	Pld	W	D	L	GF	GA	GD	Pts	Qualification	BUD	BUC	SÄV	LUB
1	(Montenegro) Budućnost	6	5	1	0	169	131	+38	11	Advanced to main round	—	23–23	33–20	29–25
2	(Romania) CSM București	6	4	1	1	163	138	+25	9	Advanced to main round	22–28	—	27–22	33–21
3	(Sweden) IK Sävehof	6	2	0	4	138	158	−20	4	Advanced to main round	18–25	17–28	—	27–24
4	(Poland) MKS Selgros Lublin	6	0	0	6	141	184	−43	0		23–31	27–30	21–34	—

Source: EHF
Rules for classification: 1) Points; 2) Head-to-head; 3) Goal difference; 4) Goals scored

== Main round ==
=== Group 1 ===
Pos	Team	Pld	W	D	L	GF	GA	GD	Pts	Qualification	ROS	LAR	FER	HCM	FLE	THÜ
1	(Russia) Rostov-Don	10	9	1	0	281	237	+44	19	Advanced to quarterfinals	—	26–25	23–21	27–26	38–21	30–24
2	(Norway) Larvik HK	10	6	0	4	281	263	+18	12 (Note: Larvik 64–61 Ferencváros)	Advanced to quarterfinals	21–27	—	37–31	27–22	26–31	28–19
3	(Hungary) FTC-Rail Cargo Hungaria	10	5	2	3	282	272	+10	12	Advanced to quarterfinals	29–29	30–27	—	21–18	36–23	32–28
4	(Romania) HCM Baia Mare	10	5	0	5	259	247	+12	10	Advanced to quarterfinals	20–22	29–31	32–24	—	31–28	38–27
5	(France) Fleury Loiret HB	10	2	2	6	252	287	−35	6		22–27	28–31	28–28	17–18	—	27–21
6	(Germany) Thüringer HC	10	0	1	9	244	297	−53	1		28–32	20–28	27–30	23–25	27–27	—

Source: EHF
Rules for classification: 1) Points; 2) Head-to-head; 3) Goal difference; 4) Goals scored

=== Group 2 ===
Pos	Team	Pld	W	D	L	GF	GA	GD	Pts	Qualification	BUD	GYO	VAR	BUC	MID	SÄV
1	(Montenegro) Budućnost	10	7	1	2	264	213	+51	15 (Note: Budućnost 45–44 Győr)	Advanced to quarterfinals	—	25–22	31–19	23–23	27–21	33–20
2	(Hungary) Győri Audi ETO KC	10	7	1	2	252	230	+22	15	Advanced to quarterfinals	22–20	—	28–27	28–22	21–26	32–26
3	(North Macedonia) Vardar	10	7	0	3	269	246	+23	14	Advanced to quarterfinals	26–24	22–27	—	22–21	33–24	37–25
4	(Romania) CSM București	10	4	1	5	242	239	+3	9	Advanced to quarterfinals	22–28	22–24	25–30	—	24–22	27–22
5	(Denmark) Midtjylland	10	2	1	7	220	261	−41	5		18–28	22–22	15–25	23–28	—	25–21
6	(Sweden) IK Sävehof	10	1	0	9	225	286	−61	2		18–26	18–26	26–29	17–28	32–24	—

Source: EHF
Rules for classification: 1) Points; 2) Head-to-head; 3) Goal difference; 4) Goals scored

== Knockout stage ==
=== Quarterfinals ===
Team 1	Agg.	Team 2	1st leg	2nd leg
CSM București (Romania)	55–53	(Russia) Rostov-Don	26–25	29–28
Vardar (North Macedonia)	60–48	(Norway) Larvik HK	34–20	26–28
FTC-Rail Cargo Hungaria (Hungary)	41–71	(Hungary) Győri Audi ETO KC	18–31	23–40
HCM Baia Mare (Romania)	49–61	(Montenegro) Budućnost	24–29	25–32

=== Final four ===
The final four was held at the László Papp Budapest Sports Arena in Budapest, Hungary on 7 and 8 May 2016. The draw was held on 15 April 2016 at 11:30.

=== Bracket ===
Semifinals
7 May
(Romania) CSM București	27
(North Macedonia) Vardar	21
7 May
(Montenegro) Budućnost	20
(Hungary) Győri Audi ETO KC	21

Final
8 May
(Romania) CSM București (Pen.)	29
(Hungary) Győri Audi ETO KC	26
Third place
8 May
(North Macedonia) Vardar	30
(Montenegro) Budućnost	28

=== Final ===
8 May 2016
17:45
CSM București (Romania)
29–26 (ET)
(Hungary) Győri Audi ETO KC
László Papp Budapest Sports Arena, Budapest
Attendance: 12,000
Referees: Arntsen, Røen (NOR)
Gulldén 15
(13–12)
Løke 8
4× (yellow card) 2× (suspension)
Report
3× (yellow card) 3× (suspension)

FT: 22–22 ET: 3–3 Pen: 4–1

== Awards and statistics ==
=== Top goalscorers ===
Statistics exclude qualifying rounds and play-off round.

Rank	Player	Team	Goals
1	(Sweden) Isabelle Gulldén	(Romania) CSM București	108
2	(Russia) Ekaterina Ilina	(Russia) Rostov-Don	97
3	(Romania) Cristina Neagu	(Montenegro) Budućnost	94
4	(Norway) Nora Mørk	(Norway) Larvik	93
5	(France) Allison Pineau	(Romania) HCM Baia Mare	89
6	(Montenegro) Katarina Bulatović	(Montenegro) Budućnost	87
7	(Croatia) Andrea Penezić	(North Macedonia) Vardar	79
8	(Ukraine) Iuliia Managarova	(Russia) Rostov-Don	72
9	(Serbia) Andrea Lekić	(North Macedonia) Vardar	70
10	(Norway) Heidi Løke	(Hungary) Győri Audi ETO KC	69

=== All-Star Team ===
The all-star team and awards were announced on 6 May 2016.

- Goalkeeper: Kari Aalvik Grimsbø (NOR)
- Right wing: Jovanka Radičević (MNE)
- Right back: Nora Mørk (NOR)
- Centre back: Cornelia Groot (NED)
- Left back: Cristina Neagu (ROU)
- Left wing: Anikó Kovacsics (HUN)
- Pivot: Heidi Løke (NOR)

=== Other awards ===
- MVP of the Final Four: Jelena Grubišić (CRO)
- Best Coach: Ambros Martín (ESP)
- Best Young Player: Luca Szekerczes (HUN)
- Best Defence Player: Eduarda Amorim (BRA)
