= Iwona Niedźwiedź =

Polish handball player (born 1979)

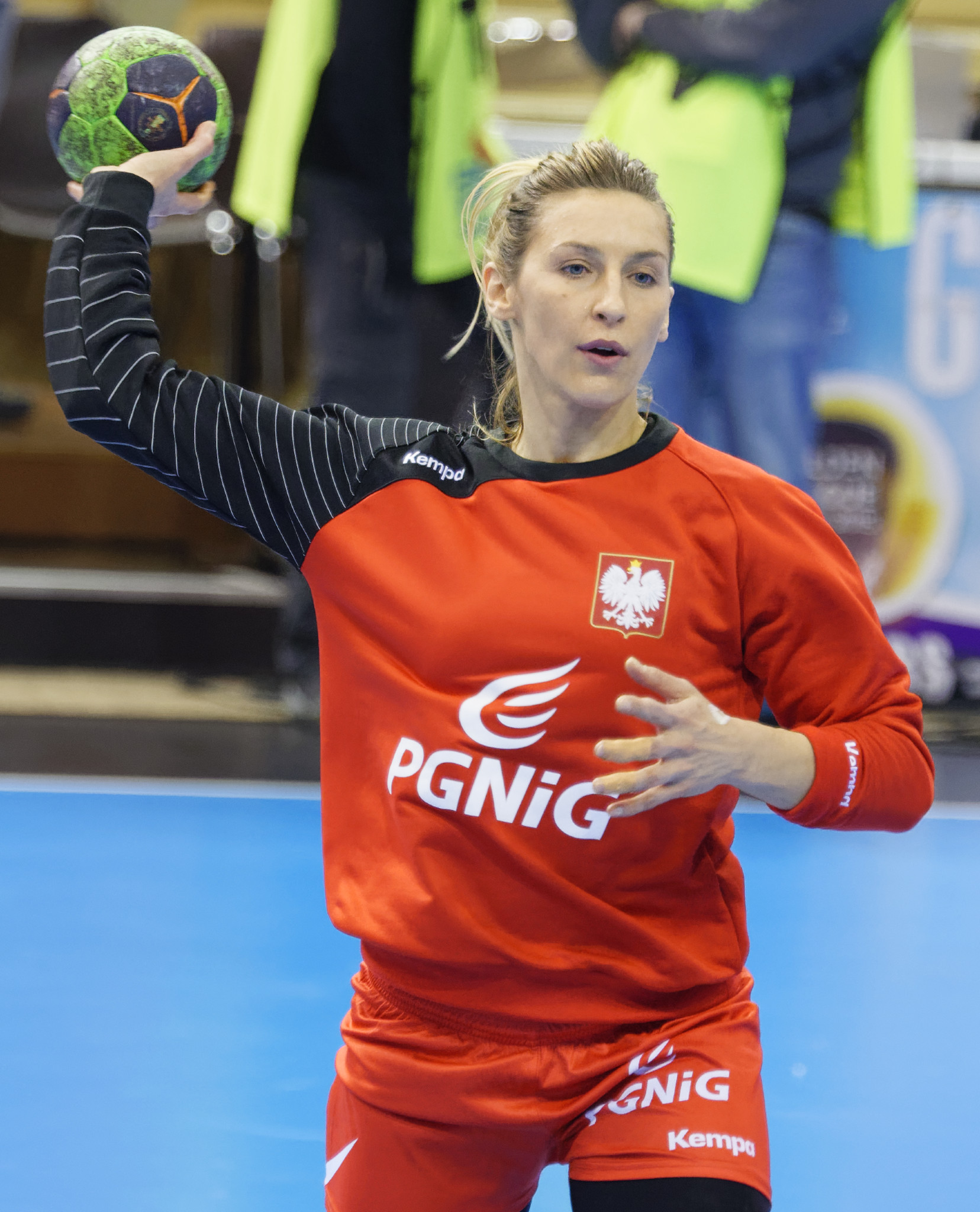
- Iwona Niedźwiedź at the Cross Match against Germany at the Beach Handball, Euro 2019

Personal information
- Nationality: Polish
- Born: 22 July 1979 (age 47) Nowy Sącz, Poland
- Height: 1.77 m (5 ft 10 in)

Sport
- Sport: Handball
- Position: Left back
- Current club: Retired
National team
Years	Team	Apps	(Gls)
2000–2015	Poland	193	(537)

Iwona Niedźwiedź (born 22 July 1979) is a Polish former handball player. She lastly played for the club SPR Lublin SSA, and she played for the Polish national team and represented Poland at the 2013 World Women's Handball Championship in Serbia.

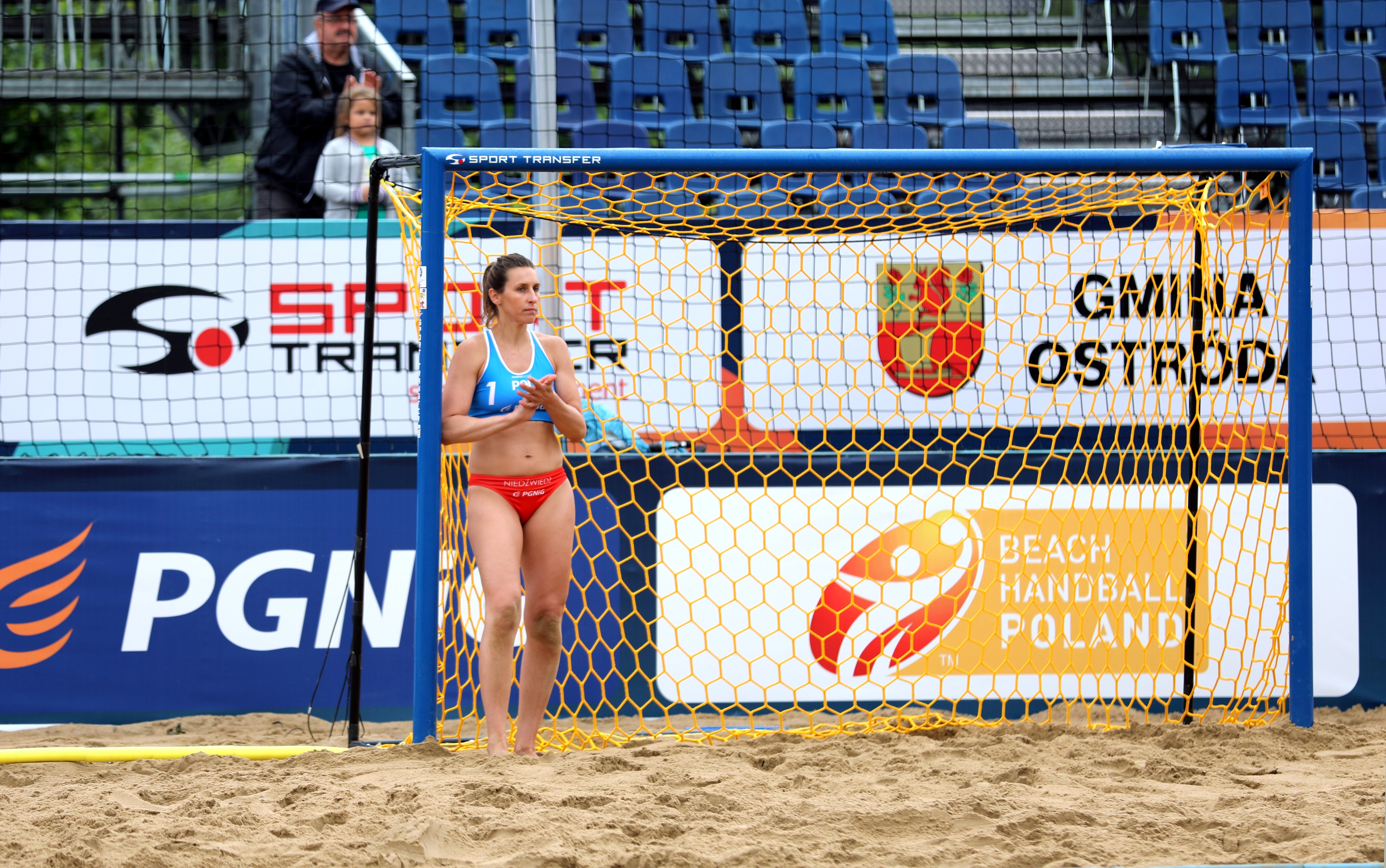
Niedźwiedź at the shootout at the Cross Match against Germany at the Beach handball Euro 2019

Niedźwiedź also played for Poland women's national beach handball team and participated at the 2019 European Beach Handball Championships in Stare Jabłonki.

After her career ended, she began working with Kanał Sportowy as a journalist.
