= Loui Sand =

Swedish handball player (born 1992)

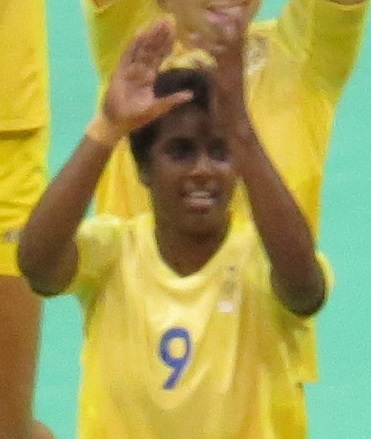
- Sand playing with the women handball squad during the 2016 Summer Olympics

Personal information
- Nationality: Swedish
- Born: 27 December 1992 (age 33) Modara, Sri Lanka
- Height: 1.64 m (5 ft 5 in)

Sport
- Sport: Handball
- Position: Left wing
- Current club: Kärra HF

Youth career
- Years: Team
- 2001-2005: Kärra HF
- 2005-2009: Önnereds HK
- 2009-2011: IK Sävehof

Senior clubs
- Years: Team
- 2011–2017: IK Sävehof
- 2017–2018: Brest Bretagne Handball
- 2018: Fleury Loiret Handball
- 2021–: Kärra HF
National team
| Years | Team | Apps | (Gls) |
| 2012–2018 | Sweden | 105 | (221) |
Medal record
European Championship
| Bronze medal – third place | 2014 Croatia/Hungary |

Loui Nelum Sandamali Sand (born Louise Sand; 27 December 1992 in Modara, Sri Lanka) is a Swedish handball player. In January 2019, Sand announced his retirement from handball due to gender dysphoria. In 2021, he made a comeback in handball, as he signed a contract with the Swedish Kärra HF's men's team, becoming the first trans professional handball player in Sweden.

== Early life ==
Sand was adopted from Sri Lanka by a Swedish couple and raised in Gothenburg.

== Career ==
He started his career at the youth team of Kärra HF in 2001. He then joined Önnereds HK for four years before joining Swedish top club IK Sävehof, where he debuted for the senior team in 2011. with the club he won 5 straight Swedish championships from 2012 to 2016.

In 2017 Sand joined French team Brest Bretagne HB in order to become professional. After a conflict with the coach, he left the club a year later. He then joined Fleury Loiret Handball. In January 2019 he left the club in order to transition.

In May 2021 he made a comeback for the men's team at Kärra HF, where he had begun his career. He made his debut for the team on 25 September 2021.

== National team ==
He debuted for the Sweden women's national handball team in October 2012, and later the same year played at his first major international tournament at the 2012 European Women's Handball Championship. At the 2014 European Women's Handball Championship he won bronze medals with the Swedish team. He represented Sweden at 7 major international tournaments.

== Achievements ==
- Carpathian Trophy (women's handball):
  - Winner: 2015
- Handbollsligan
  - Winner: 2012, 2013, 2014, 2015, 2016
- European Championship
  - Bronze medals: 2014
