= Julia Eriksson =

Swedish handball player (born 1994)

Personal information
- Full name: Julia Hanna Josefin Eriksson
- Nationality: Swedish
- Born: 7 July 1994 (age 32) Gothenburg, Sweden
- Height: 1.82 m (6 ft 0 in)

Sport
- Sport: Handball
- Position: Left back
- Current club: Kastamonu
- Number: 14

Senior clubs
- Years: Team
- 2001-2014: Kärra HF
- 2014–2018: IK Sävehof
- 2018–2020: Randers HK
- 2020: Lugi HF
- 2020–2021: Kastamonu
- 2021–: Silkeborg-Voel KFUM

Julia Hanna Josefin Eriksson (born 7 July 1994) is a Swedish handball player who plays for Kastamonu Bld. GSK (women's handball). She was the 12th best scorer in the 2015–16 edition of Champions League (67 goals).

On April 5, 2016, the European Handball Federation named her among the best young players of the 2015–16 EHF Champions League.

== Achievements ==
- Swedish Championship:
  - Winner: 2015, 2016

== Individual awards ==
- EHF Champions League Player of Main Round 4: 2016
