= Svenja Huber =

German handball player (born 1985)

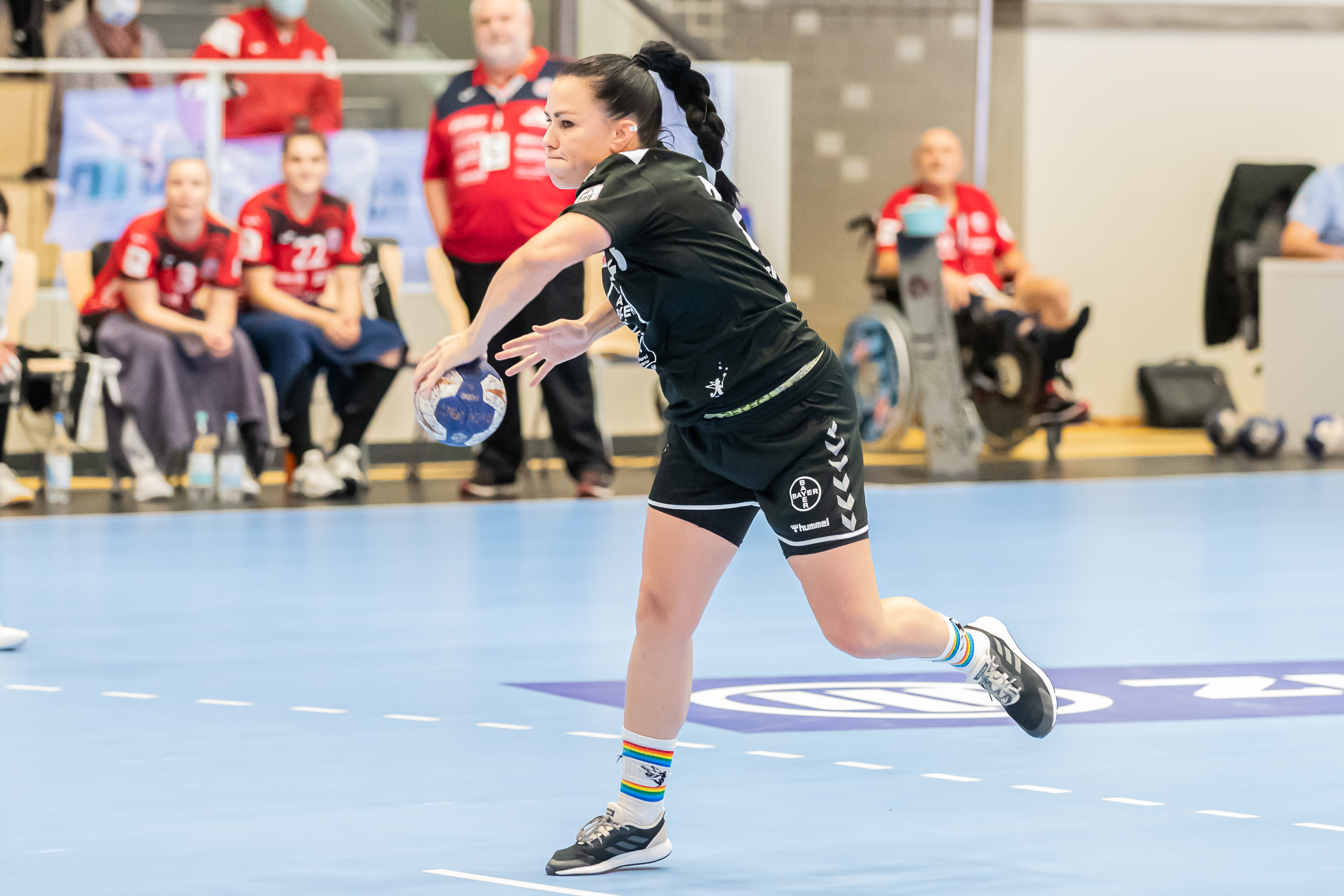

Personal information
- Nationality: German
- Born: 23 October 1985 (age 40) Mannheim, Germany
- Height: 1.68 m (5 ft 6 in)

Sport
- Sport: Handball
- Position: Right wing
- Current club: Bayer 04 Leverkusen (handball)
- Number: 23

Youth career
- Years: Team
- 1992–2002: SG Heddesheim

Senior clubs
- Years: Team
- 2002–2008: TSG Ketsch
- 2008–2010: DJK/MJC Trier
- 2010–2013: TuS Weibern
- 2013–2016: Thüringer HC
- 2016–2019: Borussia Dortmund
- 2019-: Bayer 04 Leverkusen (handball)
National team
Years	Team	Apps	(Gls)
2006–2017	Germany	54	(171)

Svenja Huber (born 23 October 1985) is a German handball player for Borussia Dortmund and the German national team.
