= Luca Szekerczés =

Hungarian handball player (born 1994)

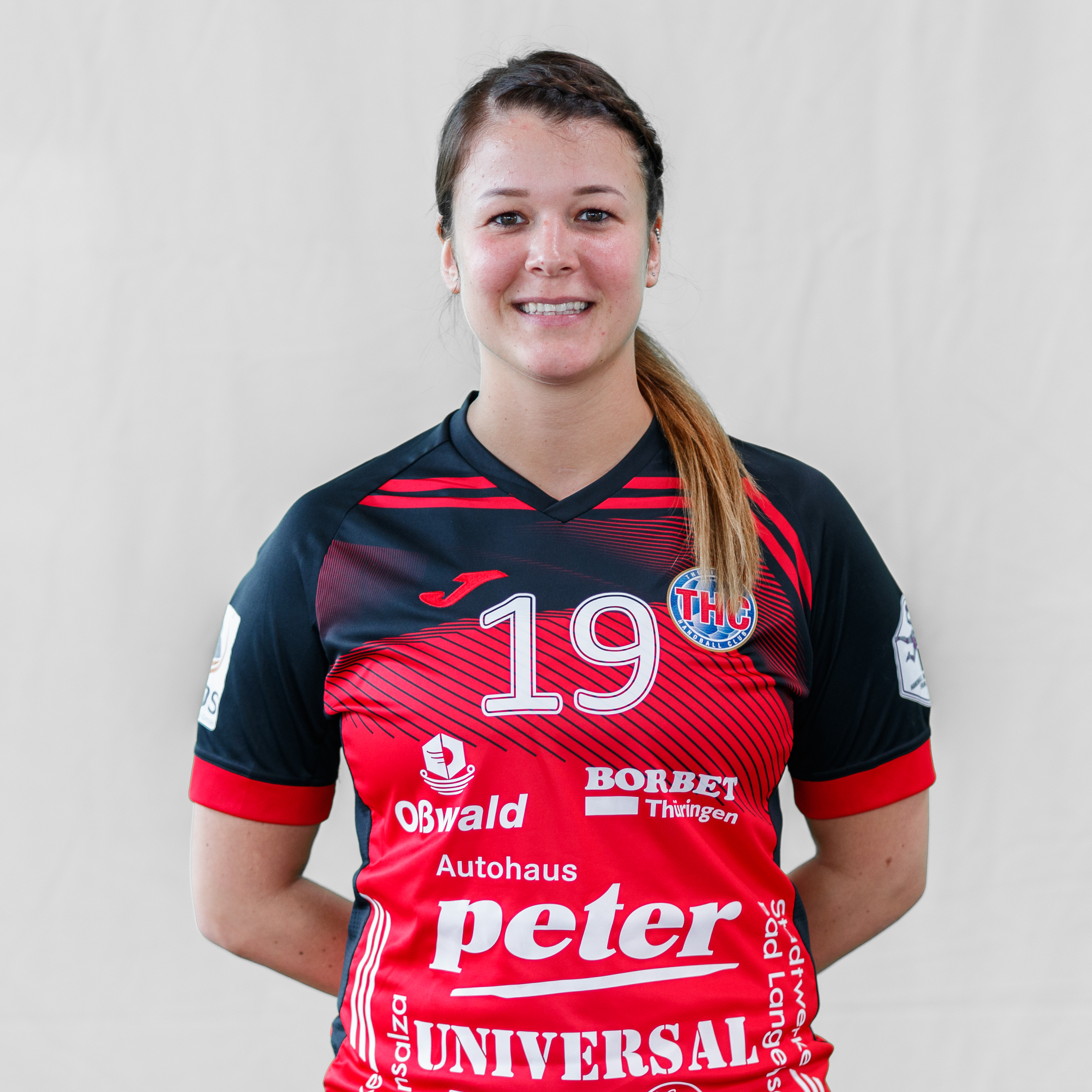

Personal information
- Full name: Luca Szekerczés
- Nationality: Hungarian
- Born: 18 June 1994 (age 32) Bonyhád, Hungary
- Height: 1.75 m (5 ft 9 in)

Sport
- Sport: Handball
- Position: Right back
- Current club: Moyra-Budaörs Handball
- Number: 9

Senior clubs
- Years: Team
- –2012: UKSE Szekszárd
- 2012–2016: Ferencvárosi TC
- loan: → Siófok KC
- 2016–2017: TuS Metzingen
- 2017–2020: Dunaújvárosi KKA
- 2020–2021: MTK Budapest
- 2021–2022: Thüringer HC
- 2022–2023: Szombathelyi KKA
- 2023–: Moyra-Budaörs Handball
National team
Years	Team	Apps	(Gls)
2014–	Hungary	4	(8)
Medal record
Junior European Championship
Silver medal – second place	2013 Denmark
- Updated on 22 July 2018

Luca Szekerczés (born 18 June 1994) is a Hungarian handballer who plays for Budaörs.

== Individual awards ==
- Hungarian Handball Federation Best Female Youth Player : 2012
- All-Star Right Back of the Junior European Championship: 2013
- All-Star Right Back of the Junior World Championship: 2014
- Best Young Player of the EHF Champions League: 2016
- Handball-Planet.com World Young Female All-Star Team: 2015-16
