= Isabelle Gulldén =

Swedish handball player (born 1989)

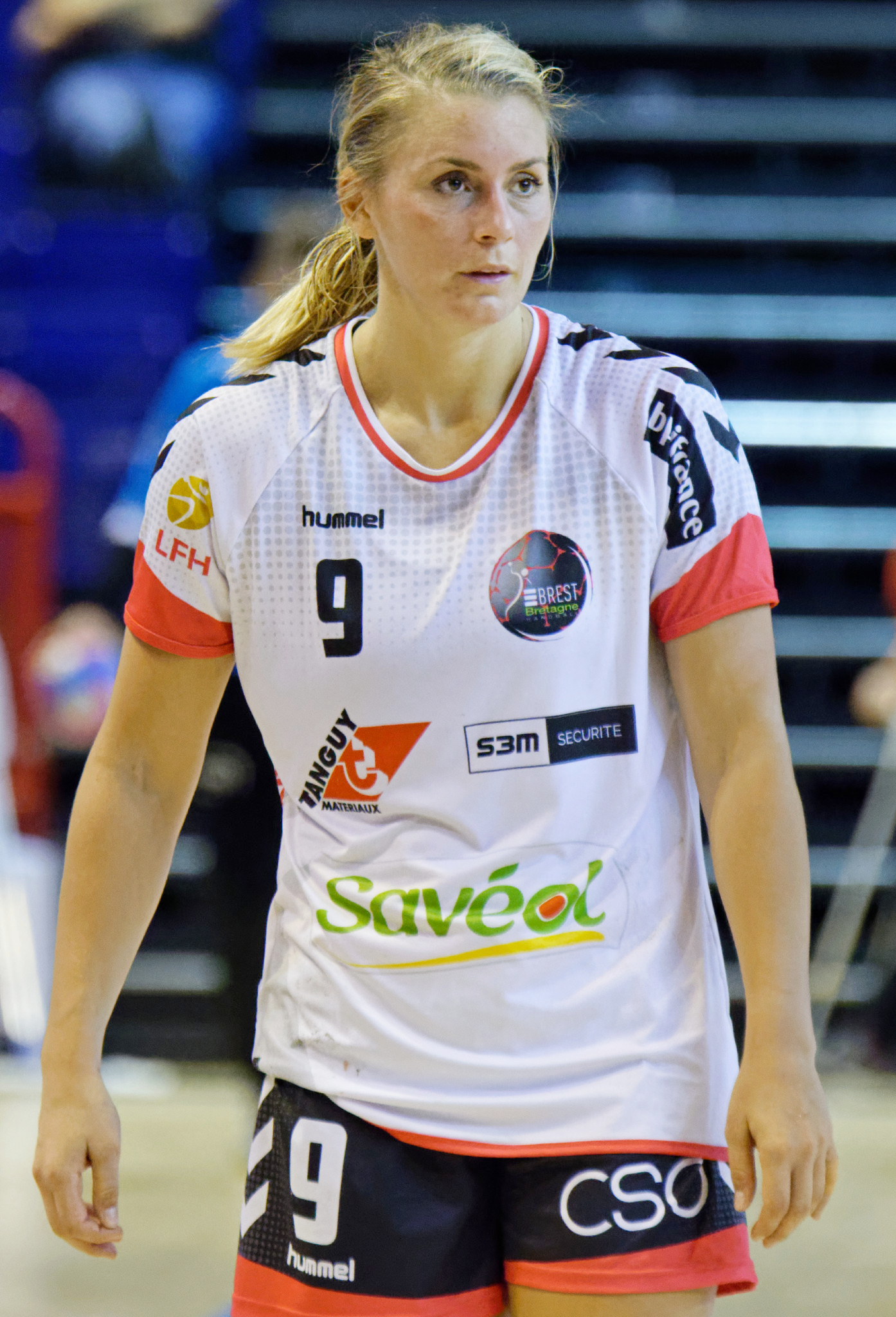
- Isabelle Gulldén playing for Brest Bretagne Handball in September 2018

Personal information
- Full name: Isabelle Therese Gulldén
- Nationality: Swedish
- Born: 29 June 1989 (age 37) Partille, Sweden
- Height: 1.78 m (5 ft 10 in)

Sport
- Sport: Handball
- Position: Centre back
- Current club: Retired
- Number: 20

Youth career
- Years: Team
- –2007: IK Sävehof

Senior clubs
- Years: Team
- 2007–2011: IK Sävehof
- 2011–2015: Viborg HK
- 2015–2018: CSM București
- 2018–2021: Brest Bretagne Handball
- 2021–2022: Vipers Kristiansand
- 2022–2024: Lugi HF
National team
Years	Team	Apps	(Gls)
2007–2020	Sweden	224	(846)

Teams managed
- 2023–2024: Sweden (assistant coach)
- 2025–: IK Sävehof (assistant coach)
Medal record
European Championship
Silver medal – second place	2010 Denmark/Norway
Bronze medal – third place	2014 Croatia/Hungary

Isabelle Therese Gulldén (born 29 June 1989) is a Swedish former professional handball who last played for Lugi HF and also a former national team player for the Swedish National Team.

== Career ==
In 2008, 2012, and 2016 she was part of the Swedish team competing at the Summer Olympic Games.

In 2014, she ranked among the 150 greatest Swedish athletes of all time, list published by Dagens Nyheter. Gulldén was the only female handballer alongside legendary Mia Hermansson-Högdahl.

She was given the award of Cetățean de onoare ("Honorary Citizen") of the city of Bucharest in 2016.

She retired from the national team on 15 December 2020.

== Achievements ==
- European Championship:
  - Silver: 2010
  - Bronze: 2014
- Swedish Elite League:
  - Gold: 2007, 2008, 2009, 2010
- Danish League:
  - Gold: 2014
- Danish Cup:
  - Gold: 2011, 2013
- Romanian Liga Națională:
  - Gold: 2016, 2017, 2018
- Romanian Cupa României:
  - Gold: 2016, 2017, 2018
- French League:
  - Gold: 2021
- French Cup:
  - Gold: 2021
- EHF Champions League:
  - Gold: 2016, 2022
  - Silver: 2021
  - Bronze: 2017, 2018
- EHF Cup Winners' Cup:
  - Gold: 2014
  - Silver: 2012
- Norwegian League:
  - Winner: 2021/2022
- Norwegian Cup:
  - Winner: 2021

== International goals ==
No.	Date	Venue	Opponent	Score	Result	Competition
1.						
2.						
3.						
4.						
5.						
6.						
7.						
8.						
9.						
10.						
11.						
12.						
13.						
14.						
15.						
16.						
17.						
18.						
19.						
20.						
21.						
22.						
23.						
24.						
25.						
26.						
27.						
28.	6 December 2008	Ohrid, North Macedonia	Russia	17–12	19–19	2008 European Women's Handball Championship
29.	8 December 2008	Skopje, North Macedonia	Germany	5–11	22–33	2008 European Women's Handball Championship
30.	8 December 2008	Skopje, North Macedonia	Germany	7–14	22–33	2008 European Women's Handball Championship
31.	10 December 2008	Skopje, North Macedonia	North Macedonia	1–1	24–23	2008 European Women's Handball Championship
32.						
33.						
34.						
35.						
36.						
37.						
38.						
39.						
40.						
41.						
42.						
43.						
44.						
45.						
46.						
47.						
48.						
49.						
50.						
51.						
52.						
53.						
54.						
55.						
56.						
57.						
58.						
59.						
60.						
61.						
62.						
63.						
64.						
65.						
66.						
67.						
68.						
69.						
70.						
71.						
72.						
73.						
74.						
75.						
76.						
77.						
78.						
79.						
80.						
81.						
82.						
83.						
84.						
85.						
86.						
87.						
88.						
89.						
90.						
91.						
92.						
93.						
94.						
95.						
96.						
97.						
98.						
99.						
100.						
101.						
102.						
103.						
104.						
105.						
106.						
107.						
108.						
109.						
110.						
111.						
112.						
113.						
114.						
115.						
116.						
117.						
118.						
119.						
120.						
121.						
122.						
123.						
124.						
125.						
126.						
127.						
128.						
129.						
130.						
131.						
132.						
133.						
134.						
135.						
136.						
137.						
138.						
139.						
140.						
141.						
142.						
143.						
144.						
145.						
146.						
147.						
148.						
149.						
150.						
151.						
152.						
153.						
154.						
155.						
156.						
157.						
158.						
159.						
160.						
161.						
162.						
163.						
164.						
165.						
166.						
167.						
168.						
169.						
170.						
171.						
172.						
173.						
174.						
175.						
176.						
177.						
178.						
179.						
180.						
181.						
182.						
183.						
184.						
185.						
186.						
187.						
188.						
189.						
190.						
191.						
192.						
193.						
194.						
195.						
196.						
197.						
198.						
199.						
200.						
201.						
202.						
203.						
204.						
205.						
206.						
207.						
208.						
209.						
210.						
211.						
212.						
213.						
214.						
215.						
216.						
217.						
218.						
219.						
220.						
221.						
222.						
223.						
224.						
225.						
226.						
227.						
228.						
229.						
230.						
231.						
232.						
233.						
234.						
235.						
236.						
237.						
238.						
239.						
240.						
241.						
242.						
243.						
244.						
245.						
246.						
247.						
248.						
249.						
250.						
251.						
252.						
253.						
254.						
255.						
256.						
257.						
258.						
259.						
260.						
261.						
262.						
263.						
264.						
265.						
266.						
267.						
268.						
269.						
270.						
271.						
272.						
273.						
274.						
275.						
276.						
277.						
278.						
279.						
280.						
281.						
282.						
283.						
284.						
285.						
286.						
287.						
288.						
289.	4 December 2012	Niš, Serbia	Denmark	2–1	27–26	2012 European Women's Handball Championship
290.	4 December 2012	Niš, Serbia	Denmark	12–15	27–26	2012 European Women's Handball Championship
291.	4 December 2012	Niš, Serbia	Denmark	17–21	27–26	2012 European Women's Handball Championship
292.	6 December 2012	Niš, Serbia	North Macedonia	1–0	26–15	2012 European Women's Handball Championship
293.	6 December 2012	Niš, Serbia	North Macedonia	2–1	26–15	2012 European Women's Handball Championship
294.	6 December 2012	Niš, Serbia	North Macedonia	5–2	26–15	2012 European Women's Handball Championship
295.	6 December 2012	Niš, Serbia	North Macedonia	6–2	26–15	2012 European Women's Handball Championship
296.	6 December 2012	Niš, Serbia	North Macedonia	7–2	26–15	2012 European Women's Handball Championship
297.	6 December 2012	Niš, Serbia	North Macedonia	22–14	26–15	2012 European Women's Handball Championship
298.	6 December 2012	Niš, Serbia	North Macedonia	23–15	26–15	2012 European Women's Handball Championship
299.	8 December 2012	Niš, Serbia	France	10–17	17–24	2012 European Women's Handball Championship
300.	10 December 2012	Belgrade, Serbia	Serbia	1–0	23–23	2012 European Women's Handball Championship
301.	10 December 2012	Belgrade, Serbia	Serbia	5–1	23–23	2012 European Women's Handball Championship
302.	10 December 2012	Belgrade, Serbia	Serbia	6–2	23–23	2012 European Women's Handball Championship
303.	10 December 2012	Belgrade, Serbia	Serbia	8–4	23–23	2012 European Women's Handball Championship
304.	10 December 2012	Belgrade, Serbia	Serbia	10–16	23–23	2012 European Women's Handball Championship
305.	10 December 2012	Belgrade, Serbia	Serbia	17–19	23–23	2012 European Women's Handball Championship
306.	11 December 2012	Belgrade, Serbia	Norway	1–1	25–28	2012 European Women's Handball Championship
307.	11 December 2012	Belgrade, Serbia	Norway	7–3	25–28	2012 European Women's Handball Championship
308.	11 December 2012	Belgrade, Serbia	Norway	8–3	25–28	2012 European Women's Handball Championship
309.	11 December 2012	Belgrade, Serbia	Norway	10–7	25–28	2012 European Women's Handball Championship
310.	11 December 2012	Belgrade, Serbia	Norway	11–7	25–28	2012 European Women's Handball Championship
311.	11 December 2012	Belgrade, Serbia	Norway	13–8	25–28	2012 European Women's Handball Championship
312.	11 December 2012	Belgrade, Serbia	Norway	17–15	25–28	2012 European Women's Handball Championship
313.	11 December 2012	Belgrade, Serbia	Norway	18–16	25–28	2012 European Women's Handball Championship
314.	11 December 2012	Belgrade, Serbia	Norway	20–20	25–28	2012 European Women's Handball Championship
315.	11 December 2012	Belgrade, Serbia	Norway	23–26	25–28	2012 European Women's Handball Championship
316.	13 December 2012	Belgrade, Serbia	Czech Republic	1–1	35–26	2012 European Women's Handball Championship
317.	13 December 2012	Belgrade, Serbia	Czech Republic	4–5	35–26	2012 European Women's Handball Championship
318.	13 December 2012	Belgrade, Serbia	Czech Republic	5–6	35–26	2012 European Women's Handball Championship
319.	13 December 2012	Belgrade, Serbia	Czech Republic	7–6	35–26	2012 European Women's Handball Championship
320.	13 December 2012	Belgrade, Serbia	Czech Republic	12–12	35–26	2012 European Women's Handball Championship
321.	13 December 2012	Belgrade, Serbia	Czech Republic	23–20	35–26	2012 European Women's Handball Championship
322.						
323.						
324.						
325.						
326.						
327.						
328.						
329.						
330.						
331.						
332.						
333.						
334.						
335.						
336.						
337.						
338.						
339.						
340.						
341.						
342.						
343.						
344.						
345.						
346.						
347.						
348.						
349.						
350.						
351.						
352.						
353.						
354.						
355.						
356.						
357.						
358.						
359.						
360.						
361.						
362.						
363.						
364.						
365.						
366.						
367.						
368.						
369.						
370.						
371.						
372.						
373.						
374.						
375.						
376.						
377.						
378.						
379.						
380.						
381.						
382.						
383.						
384.						
385.						
386.						
387.						
388.						
389.						
390.						
391.						
392.						
393.						
394.						
395.						
396.						
397.						
398.						
399.						
400.						
401.						
402.						
403.						
404.						
405.						
406.						
407.						
408.						
409.						
410.						
411.						
412.						
413.						
414.						
415.						
416.						
417.						
418.						
419.						
420.						
421.						
422.						
423.						
424.						
425.	8 December 2014	Varaždin, Croatia	Croatia	5–4	30–28	2014 European Women's Handball Championship
426.	8 December 2014	Varaždin, Croatia	Croatia	12–10	30–28	2014 European Women's Handball Championship
427.	8 December 2014	Varaždin, Croatia	Croatia	18–18	30–28	2014 European Women's Handball Championship
428.	8 December 2014	Varaždin, Croatia	Croatia	23–20	30–28	2014 European Women's Handball Championship
429.	8 December 2014	Varaždin, Croatia	Croatia	24–22	30–28	2014 European Women's Handball Championship
430.	8 December 2014	Varaždin, Croatia	Croatia	25–24	30–28	2014 European Women's Handball Championship
431.	8 December 2014	Varaždin, Croatia	Croatia	30–26	30–28	2014 European Women's Handball Championship
432.	10 December 2014	Varaždin, Croatia	Netherlands	6–8	30–30	2014 European Women's Handball Championship
433.	10 December 2014	Varaždin, Croatia	Netherlands	11–12	30–30	2014 European Women's Handball Championship
434.	10 December 2014	Varaždin, Croatia	Netherlands	28–29	30–30	2014 European Women's Handball Championship
435.	12 December 2014	Varaždin, Croatia	Germany	3–1	39–27	2014 European Women's Handball Championship
436.	12 December 2014	Varaždin, Croatia	Germany	8–3	39–27	2014 European Women's Handball Championship
437.	12 December 2014	Varaždin, Croatia	Germany	10–4	39–27	2014 European Women's Handball Championship
438.	12 December 2014	Varaždin, Croatia	Germany	11–4	39–27	2014 European Women's Handball Championship
439.	12 December 2014	Varaždin, Croatia	Germany	13–6	39–27	2014 European Women's Handball Championship
440.	12 December 2014	Varaždin, Croatia	Germany	16–11	39–27	2014 European Women's Handball Championship
441.	12 December 2014	Varaždin, Croatia	Germany	17–12	39–27	2014 European Women's Handball Championship
442.	12 December 2014	Varaždin, Croatia	Germany	28–21	39–27	2014 European Women's Handball Championship
443.	12 December 2014	Varaždin, Croatia	Germany	31–23	39–27	2014 European Women's Handball Championship
444.	12 December 2014	Varaždin, Croatia	Germany	34–27	39–27	2014 European Women's Handball Championship
445.	14 December 2014	Zagreb, Croatia	France	6–10	29–26	2014 European Women's Handball Championship
446.	14 December 2014	Zagreb, Croatia	France	18–19	29–26	2014 European Women's Handball Championship
447.	14 December 2014	Zagreb, Croatia	France	21–20	29–26	2014 European Women's Handball Championship
448.	14 December 2014	Zagreb, Croatia	France	22–22	29–26	2014 European Women's Handball Championship
449.	16 December 2014	Zagreb, Croatia	Slovakia	2–0	31–22	2014 European Women's Handball Championship
450.	16 December 2014	Zagreb, Croatia	Slovakia	4–2	31–22	2014 European Women's Handball Championship
451.	16 December 2014	Zagreb, Croatia	Slovakia	6–2	31–22	2014 European Women's Handball Championship
452.	16 December 2014	Zagreb, Croatia	Slovakia	7–3	31–22	2014 European Women's Handball Championship
453.	16 December 2014	Zagreb, Croatia	Slovakia	14–7	31–22	2014 European Women's Handball Championship
454.	16 December 2014	Zagreb, Croatia	Slovakia	15–8	31–22	2014 European Women's Handball Championship
455.	16 December 2014	Zagreb, Croatia	Slovakia	20–12	31–22	2014 European Women's Handball Championship
456.	16 December 2014	Zagreb, Croatia	Slovakia	25–19	31–22	2014 European Women's Handball Championship
457.	16 December 2014	Zagreb, Croatia	Slovakia	29–20	31–22	2014 European Women's Handball Championship
458.	17 December 2014	Zagreb, Croatia	Montenegro	6–5	29–30	2014 European Women's Handball Championship
459.	17 December 2014	Zagreb, Croatia	Montenegro	7–5	29–30	2014 European Women's Handball Championship
460.	17 December 2014	Zagreb, Croatia	Montenegro	9–6	29–30	2014 European Women's Handball Championship
461.	17 December 2014	Zagreb, Croatia	Montenegro	10–7	29–30	2014 European Women's Handball Championship
462.	17 December 2014	Zagreb, Croatia	Montenegro	12–9	29–30	2014 European Women's Handball Championship
463.	17 December 2014	Zagreb, Croatia	Montenegro	13–11	29–30	2014 European Women's Handball Championship
464.	17 December 2014	Zagreb, Croatia	Montenegro	14–11	29–30	2014 European Women's Handball Championship
465.	17 December 2014	Zagreb, Croatia	Montenegro	19–14	29–30	2014 European Women's Handball Championship
466.	17 December 2014	Zagreb, Croatia	Montenegro	23–20	29–30	2014 European Women's Handball Championship
467.	19 December 2014	Budapest, Hungary	Norway	8–10	25–29	2014 European Women's Handball Championship
468.	19 December 2014	Budapest, Hungary	Norway	10–12	25–29	2014 European Women's Handball Championship
469.	19 December 2014	Budapest, Hungary	Norway	11–12	25–29	2014 European Women's Handball Championship
470.	19 December 2014	Budapest, Hungary	Norway	14–16	25–29	2014 European Women's Handball Championship
471.	19 December 2014	Budapest, Hungary	Norway	15–16	25–29	2014 European Women's Handball Championship
472.	19 December 2014	Budapest, Hungary	Norway	19–23	25–29	2014 European Women's Handball Championship
473.	19 December 2014	Budapest, Hungary	Norway	20–24	25–29	2014 European Women's Handball Championship
474.	19 December 2014	Budapest, Hungary	Norway	22–27	25–29	2014 European Women's Handball Championship
475.	19 December 2014	Budapest, Hungary	Norway	24–28	25–29	2014 European Women's Handball Championship
476.	21 December 2014	Budapest, Hungary	Montenegro	6–8	25–23	2014 European Women's Handball Championship
477.	21 December 2014	Budapest, Hungary	Montenegro	8–10	25–23	2014 European Women's Handball Championship
478.	21 December 2014	Budapest, Hungary	Montenegro	13–12	25–23	2014 European Women's Handball Championship
479.	21 December 2014	Budapest, Hungary	Montenegro	14–12	25–23	2014 European Women's Handball Championship
480.	21 December 2014	Budapest, Hungary	Montenegro	16–13	25–23	2014 European Women's Handball Championship
481.	21 December 2014	Budapest, Hungary	Montenegro	22–20	25–23	2014 European Women's Handball Championship
482.	21 December 2014	Budapest, Hungary	Montenegro	23–22	25–23	2014 European Women's Handball Championship
483.						
484.						
485.						
486.						
487.						
488.						
489.						
490.						
491.						
492.						
493.						
494.						
495.						
496.						
497.						
498.						
499.						
500.						
501.						
502.						
503.						
504.						
505.						
506.						
507.						
508.						
509.						
510.						
511.						
512.						
513.						
514.						
515.						
516.						
517.						
518.						
519.						
520.						
521.						
522.						
523.						
524.						
525.						
526.						
527.						
528.						
529.						
530.						
531.						
532.						
533.						
534.						
535.						
536.						
537.						
538.						
539.						
540.						
541.						
542.						
543.						
544.						
545.						
546.						
547.						
548.						
549.						
550.						
551.						
552.						
553.						
554.						
555.						
556.						
557.						
558.						
559.						
560.						
561.						
562.						
563.						
564.						
565.						
566.						
567.						
568.						
569.						
570.						
571.						
572.						
573.						
574.						
575.						
576.						
577.						
578.						
579.						
580.						
581.						
582.						
583.						
584.						
585.						
586.						
587.						
588.						
589.						
590.						
591.						
592.						
593.						
594.						
595.						
596.						
597.						
598.						
599.						
600.						
601.						
602.						
603.						
604.						
605.						
606.						
607.						
608.						
609.						
610.						
611.						
612.						
613.						
614.						
615.						
616.						
617.						
618.						
619.						
620.						
621.						
622.						
623.						
624.						
625.						
626.						
627.						
628.						
629.						
630.						
631.						
632.						
633.						
634.						
635.						
636.						
637.						
638.						
639.						
640.						
641.						
642.						
643.						
644.						
645.						
646.						
647.						
648.						
649.						
650.						
651.						
652.						
653.						
654.						
655.						
656.						
657.						
658.						
659.						
660.						
661.						
662.						
663.						
664.						
665.						
666.						
667.						
668.						
669.						
670.						
671.						
672.						
673.						
674.						
675.						
676.						
677.						
678.						
679.						
680.						
681.						
682.						
683.						
684.						
685.						
686.						
687.						
688.						
689.						
690.						
691.						
692.						
693.						
694.						
695.						
696.						
697.						
698.						
699.						
700.						
701.						
702.						
703.						
704.						
705.						
706.						
707.						
708.						
709.						
710.						
711.						
712.						
713.						
714.						
715.						
716.						
717.						
718.						
719.						
720.						
721.						
722.						
723.						
724.						
725.						
726.						
727.						
728.						
729.						
730.						
731.						
732.						
733.						
734.						
735.						
736.						
737.						
738.						
739.						
740.						
741.						
742.						
743.						
744.						
745.						
746.						
747.						
748.						
749.						
750.						
751.						
752.						
753.						
754.						
755.						
756.						
757.						
758.						
759.						
760.						
761.						
762.						
763.						
764.						
765.						
766.						
767.						
768.						
769.						
770.						
771.						
772.						
773.						
774.						
775.						
776.						
777.						
778.						
779.						
780.						
781.						
782.						
783.						
784.						
785.						
786.						
787.						
788.						
789.						
790.						
791.						
792.						
793.						
794.						
795.						
796.						
797.						
798.						
799.						
800.						
801.						
802.						
803.						
804.						
805.						
806.						
807.						
808.						
809.						
810.						
811.						
812.						
813.						
814.						
815.						
816.						
817.						
818.						
819.						
820.						
821.						
822.						
823.						
824.						
825.						
826.						
827.						
828.						
829.						
830.						
831.						
832.						
833.						
834.						
835.						
836.						
837.						
838.						
839.						
840.						
841.						
842.						
843.						
844.						
845.						
846.						

== Individual awards ==
- Swedish Elitserien Young Player of the Season: 2008
- EHF Cup Winners' Cup Top Scorer: 2014
- Most Valuable Player of the European Championship: 2014
- European Championship Top Scorer: 2014
- EHF Champions League Top Scorer: 2016
- Romanian Liga Națională Best Foreign Player: 2015, 2016, 2017
- Swedish Elite League Best Player of All Time
- Swedish Female Handballer of the Year: 2012, 2014, 2017, 2018
- Handball-Planet.com All-Star Playmaker: 2016
- Handball-Planet.com Best Buy: 2015–16
- ProSport All-Star Centre Back of the Romanian Liga Națională: 2017, 2018

== Personal life ==
She is the niece of Christer Gulldén, a famous Swedish Greco-Roman wrestler. Her father Peter also competed in wrestling. She is married to former handball goalkeeper, Linus Persson. Their son, Lias was born on 10 July 2019.
