= Jotron Arena Larvik =

Indoor arena in Larvik, Vestfold, Norway

- Interactive map of Jotron Arena Larvik
- Location: Larvik, Norway
- Coordinates: 59.050362°N 10.052869°E
- Capacity: 4,000

Construction
- Opened: September 2009
- Cost: 969 million NOK

Tenant
- Larvik HK

Jotron Arena Larvik is an indoor arena in Larvik, Norway. It was opened in September 2009. The arena will be primarily used for handball, but the hall has additional permanent floor marks for basketball, volleyball and floorball.

Starting in September 2009, Arena Larvik will be the home court of Larvik HK. It is also one of the Norwegian venues selected to host the 2010 European Women's Handball Championship.

The former name was Boligmappa Arena Larvik.

== Larvik Arena IKS ==
Larvik Arena IKS is a joint venture between the municipalities of Larvik and Vestfold and Telemark. The company's mission is to manage the renting of Jotron Arena Larvik. Thor Heyerdahl upper secondary school operates and manages the arena during the school day. Vestfold and Telemark County Council owns the structure.
