= Allison Pineau =

French handball player (born 1989)

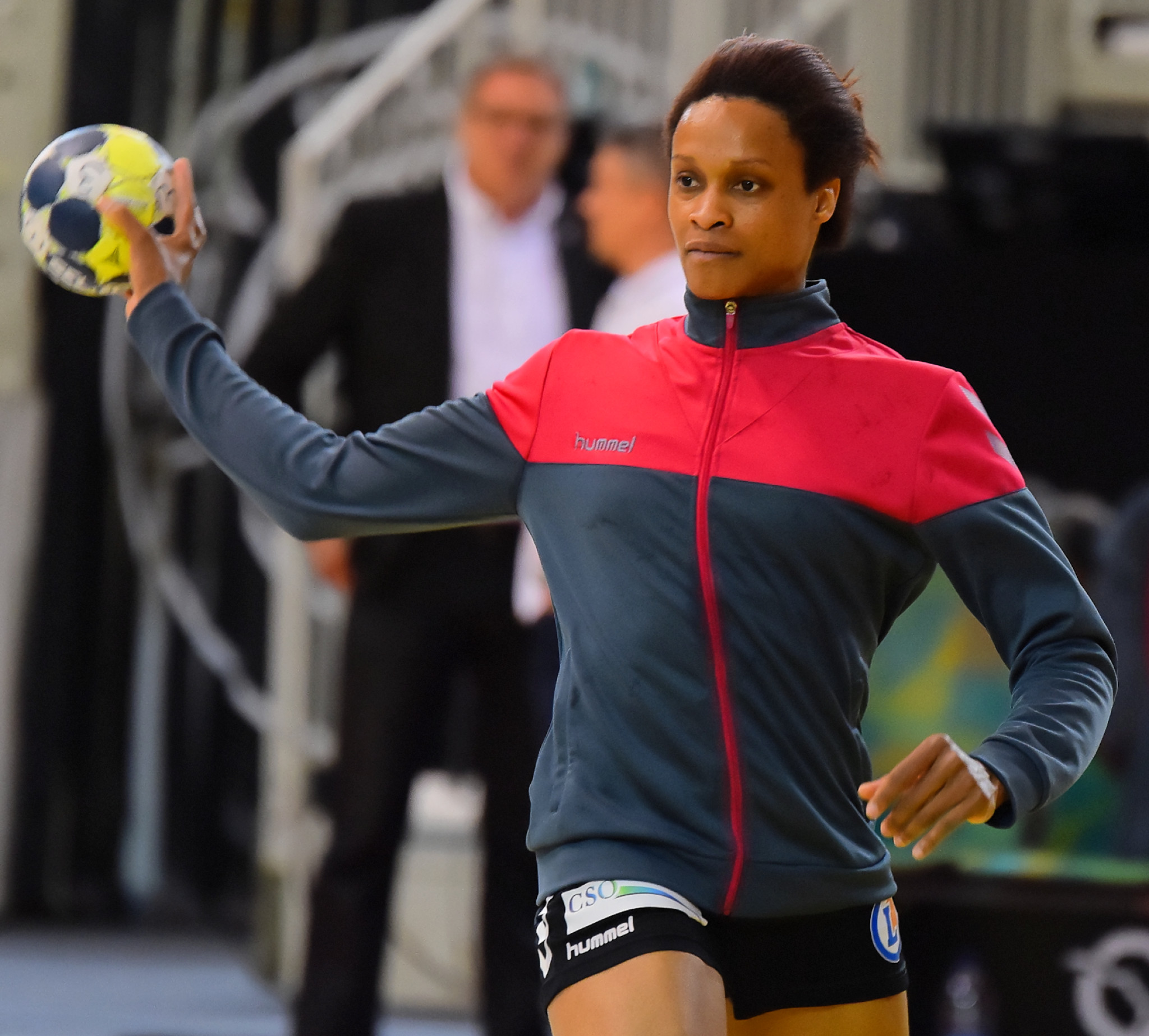
- Pineau in 2017

Personal information
- Full name: Allison Marie Pineau
- Nationality: French
- Born: 2 May 1989 (age 37) Chartres, France
- Height: 1.81 m (5 ft 11 in)

Sport
- Sport: Handball
- Position: Centre back
- Current club: Metz Handball
- Number: 7

Youth career
- Years: Team
- 2001–2003: CM Aubervilliers
- 2003–2006: Villemomble

Senior clubs
- Years: Team
- 2006–2009: Issy-les-Moulineaux
- 2009–2012: Metz Handball
- 2012–2013: Oltchim Vâlcea
- 2013–2014: ŽRK Vardar
- 2014–2015: RK Krim
- 2015: HBC Nîmes
- 2015–2016: HCM Baia Mare
- 2016–2019: Brest Bretagne Handball
- 2019–2020: Paris 92
- 2020–2021: ŽRK Budućnost
- 2021–2024: RK Krim
- 2024–2025: Metz Handball
National team
Years	Team	Apps	(Gls)
2007–2021	France	273	(696)
Medal record
Olympic Games
Gold medal – first place	2020 Tokyo	Team
Silver medal – second place	2016 Rio de Janeiro	Team
World Championship
Gold medal – first place	2017 Germany
Silver medal – second place	2009 China
Silver medal – second place	2011 Brazil
Silver medal – second place	2021 Spain
European Championship
Gold medal – first place	2018 France
Bronze medal – third place	2016 Sweden
Mediterranean Games
Gold medal – first place	2009 Pescara	Team

Allison Marie Pineau (born 2 May 1989) is a French handballer for Metz Handball and the French national team. She won gold medal at the 2017 World Championship, 2018 European Championship and 2020 Olympic Games.

She was voted World Handball Player of the Year 2009 by the International Handball Federation.

== Career ==
In March 2012, Pineau agreed with Romanian CS Oltchim Râmnicu Vâlcea and joined the club on 1 July 2012.

Between 2013 and 2015, she played for ŽRK Vardar and RK Krim. With ŽRK Vardar, she again reached the semifinals of the Champions League in the 2013–14 season claiming the bronze medal after beating FC Midtjylland 34–31.

In the summer of 2015, she returned to Romania after the three months at Nîmes in France. In 2017 she signed a contract with French team Brest Bretagne HB.

== International honours ==
National team

- Olympics:
  - Gold Medalist: 2020
  - Silver Medalist: 2016
- World Championship:
  - Gold Medalist: 2017
  - Silver Medalist: 2009, 2011, 2021
- European Championship:
  - Gold Medalist: 2018
  - Bronze Medalist: 2016

Club

- EHF Champions League:
  - Bronze Medalist: 2014
  - Semifinalist: 2013

== Individual awards ==
- IHF World Player of the Year: 2009
- All-Star Playmaker of the World Championship: 2009, 2011
- Championnat de France Best Defender: 2018

Awards
Preceded by Linn-Kristin Riegelhuth	IHF World Player of the Year – Women; 2000	Succeeded by Cristina Neagu
