= Fleury Loiret HB =

French handball club

CJF Fleury Loiret Handball
- Full name: Cercle Jules Ferry Fleury-les-Aubrais Handball
- Founded: 1974
- Dissolved: November 2022
- President: Jean-Pierre Gontier
- Head coach: Christophe Cassan
- League: Division 1 Féminine
- 2020-21: 9th
- Club colours
Home	Away

CJF Fleury Loiret Handball is a women's handball club based in Fleury-les-Aubrais, Loiret, France. The professional team was dissolved in November 2022.

== History ==
The sports team Cercle Jules Ferry Fleury-les-Aubrais was established in 1932, and in 1974 the women's handball department was established. In 2000 the team was promoted to the top league for the first time.

== Honours ==
- Division 1 Féminine:
  - Gold: 2015
  - Silver: 2016
  - Bronze: 2013
- Coupe de France:
  - Winner: 2014
- Coupe de la Ligue:
  - Winner: 2015, 2016
  - Finalists: 2008
- EHF Cup Winners' Cup:
  - Finalists: 2015
- EHF Challenge Cup:
  - Semifinalists: 2012

== European record ==
Season	Competition	Round	Club	1st leg	2nd leg	Aggregate
2016–17	EHF Cup	R2	(Germany) VfL Oldenburg	22–29	26–23	48–52

== Current squad ==
Squad for the 2022-23 season

Goalkeepers

- 3 (France) Mélodie Rapsode
- 16 (France) Justicia Toublissa Elbeco

Wingers
RW

- 21 (France) Mélina Peillon
- 76 (France) Lisa Le Merrer

LW

- 14 (France) Suzanne Wajoka
- 23 (Cuba) Eyatne Rizo

Line players

- 77 (France) Emmanuelle Thobor
- (France) Yasmine Massa

Back players
LB

- 8 (Democratic Republic of the Congo) Mélissa Agathe

CB

- 5 (Senegal) Amina Sankharé
- 10 (Guinea) Diankenba Nianh

RB

- 7 (Senegal) Doungou Camara
- (France) Fanta Keita

=== Transfers ===
Transfers for the 2022-23 season.

Joining

- (France) Fanta Keita (RB) (from (Germany) TSV Bayer 04 Leverkusen)
- (France) Yasmine Massa (LP) (from (France) Saint-Amand Handball)

Leaving

- (Poland) Paulina Uścinowicz (LB) (with immediate effect to (Germany) Borussia Dortmund Handball)
- (Sweden) Charité Mumbongo (LB) (to (Denmark) Viborg HK)
- (France) Julie Le Blevec (RW) (to (France) Metz Handball)
- (Spain) Kaba Gassama (LP) (to (Germany) SG BBM Bietigheim)
- (Denmark) Ditte Vind (GK) (to (France) Bourg-de-Péage Drôme Handball)
- (France) Elisa Técher (LB) (to (France) Brest Bretagne Handball)
- (Senegal) Laura Kamdop (LP)
