= Yekaterina Ilyina =

Russian handball player

Ekaterina Ilina
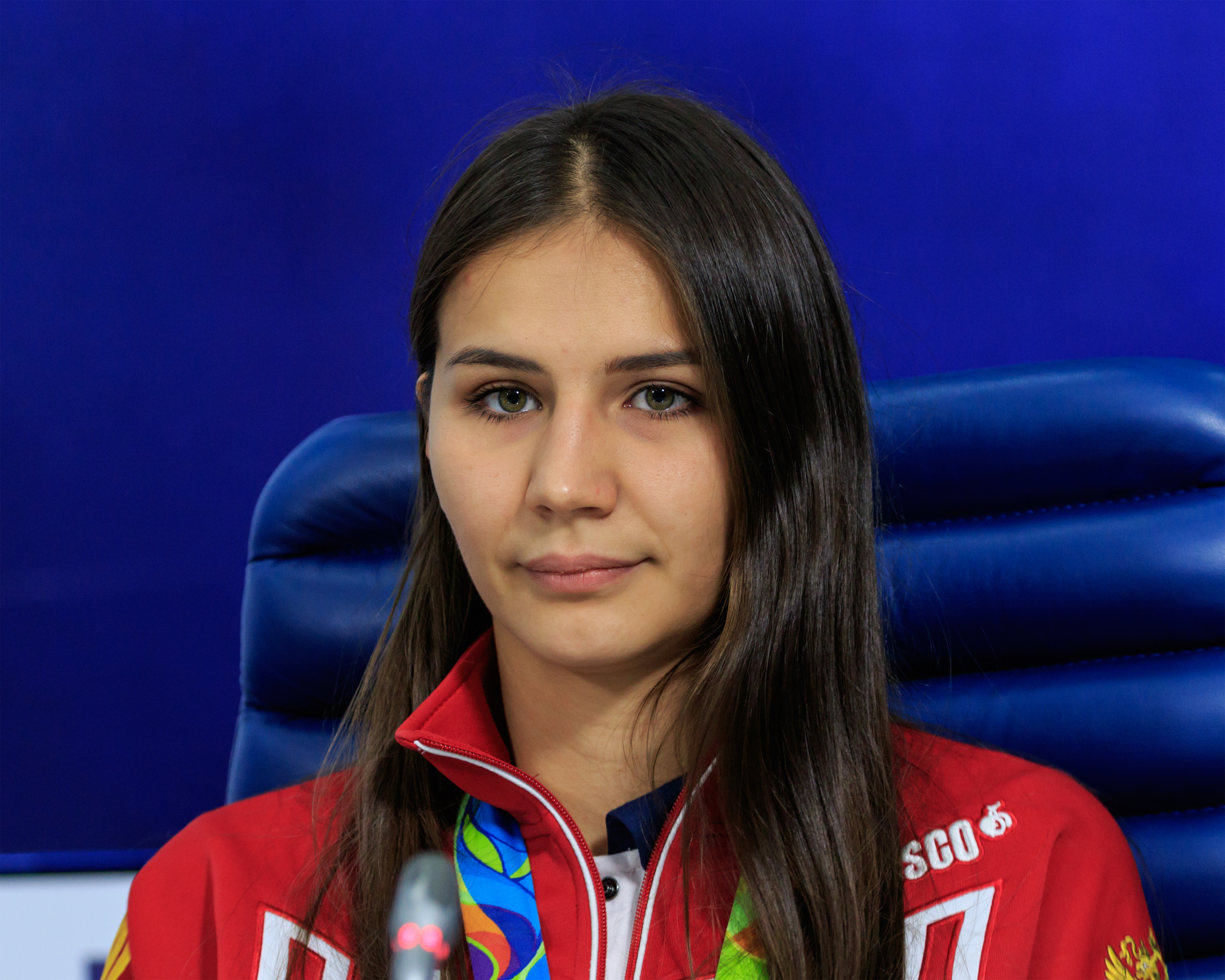
- Ilyina in 2016

Personal information
- Nationality: Russian
- Born: 7 March 1991 (age 35) Tolyatti, Russia
- Height: 1.74 m (5 ft 9 in)

Sport
- Sport: Handball
- Position: Centre back
- Current club: HBC CSKA Moscow
- Number: 33

Senior clubs
- Years: Team
- –2009: Handball Club Lada
- 2009–2013: HC Kuban Krasnodar
- 2013–2014: HC Lada
- 2014–2018: Rostov-Don
- 2019–: CSKA Moscow
National team
Years	Team	Apps	(Gls)
2012–	Russia	126	(343)
Medal record
Representing ROC
Olympic Games
Silver medal – second place	2020 Tokyo	Team
Representing Russia
Olympic Games
Gold medal – first place	2016 Rio de Janeiro	Team
World Junior Championship
Silver medal – second place	2010 South Korea	Team
World Youth Championship
Gold medal – first place	2008 Slovakia	Team

Yekaterina Fyodorovna Ilyina (Russian: Екатерина Фёдоровна Ильина, IPA: [jɪkətʲɪˈrʲinə ɪlʲjɪˈna]; born 7 March 1991) is a Russian handball player for HBC CSKA Moscow and the Russian national team.

== Career ==
Ilyina played until 2009 for HC Lada, after which she joined HC Kuban Krasnodar. After two seasons at Krasnodar she returned to HC Lada. Here she won the 2013-14 EHF Cup.

In 2014 she joined Rostov-Don. Here she won the 2015, 2017 and 2018 Russian Championship, the 2015 Russian cup and the 2017 EHF European League.

In October 2019 she joined CSKA Moscow. Here she won the 2021, 2023 and 2024 Russian Championship and the 2022, 2023 and 2024 Russian Cup.

=== National team ===
With the Russian youth national team she won the 2008 Youth European Championship. The following year she won bronze medals at the U20 World Championship.

She represented the Russian senior national team at the 2012, 2014 and 2020 European Championships.

At the 2016 Olympics she won gold medals with the Russian team. 4 years later she won silver medals at the 2020 Olympics, losing to France in the final 25–30.

== Individual awards ==
- Team of the Tournament Center Back of the Baia Mare Champions Trophy: 2014
- All star center back of the Møbelringen Cup 2015 in Norway
- MVP of Russian Super League 20/21
