= 2020–21 Győri ETO KC season =

Győri Audi ETO KC
2020–21 season
- Chairman: Dr. Csaba Bartha
- Manager: (Spain) Ambros Martín
- NB I: Runner-up
- Hungarian Cup: Champion
- EHF Champions League: Bronze medallist
- Top goalscorer: League: (France) Estelle Nze Minko (127 goals); All: (France) Estelle Nze Minko (220 goals)
Home colours	Away colours

The 2020–21 season was Győri Audi ETO KC's 41st competitive and consecutive season in the Nemzeti Bajnokság I and 73rd year in existence as a handball club.

== Players ==
=== Squad information ===
Goalkeepers

- 1 (France) Laura Glauser
- 12 (France) Amandine Leynaud
- 16 (Norway) Silje Solberg

Left wingers

- 13 (Hungary) Anita Görbicz (c)
- 14 (Hungary) Brigitta Csekő
- 23 (Hungary) Csenge Fodor
- 57 (Hungary) Szidónia Puhalák

Right wingers

- 22 (Hungary) Viktória Lukács
- 48 (Hungary) Dorottya Faluvégi

Line players

- 2 (France) Béatrice Edwige
- 7 (Norway) Kari Brattset Dale

Left backs

- 4 (Hungary) Eszter Ogonovszky
- 8 (Denmark) Anne Mette Hansen
- 18 (Brazil) Eduarda Amorim Taleska
- 21 (Norway) Veronica Kristiansen

Centre backs

- 15 (Norway) Stine Bredal Oftedal
- 27 (France) Estelle Nze Minko

Right backs

- 5 (Hungary) Laura Kürthi

=== Transfers ===
In

- (France) Laura Glauser (GK) (from (France) Metz Handball)
- (Norway) Silje Solberg (GK) (from (Hungary) Siófok KC)
- (Hungary) Viktória Lukács (RW) (from (Hungary) Ferencvárosi TC)

Out

- (Norway) Kari Aalvik Grimsbø (GK) (retired)
- (Hungary) Éva Kiss (GK) (retires)
- (Hungary) Bernadett Bódi (RW) (to (Hungary) Moyra-Budaörs Handball)
- (Czech Republic) Jana Knedlíková (RW) (to (Norway) Vipers Kristiansand)
- (Montenegro) Katarina Bulatovic (RB) (retired)
- (Norway) Amanda Kurtović (RB) (with immediate effect on loan to (Turkey) Kastamonu)

== Club ==
=== Technical Staff ===
Position	Staff member
President	(Hungary) Dr. Csaba Bartha
Technical manager	(Hungary) Péter Molnár
Head coach	(Spain) Ambros Martín
Assistant coach	(Hungary) Anita Görbicz
Goalkeeping coach	(France) Amandine Leynaud
Team doctor	(Hungary) Dr. Péter Balogh
Team doctor	(Hungary) Dr. László Szálasy
Masseur	(Hungary) Tamás Molnár
Physiotherapist	(Hungary) Ádám Devecseri
Physiotherapist	(Hungary) Nikolett Budai
Conditioning coach	(Hungary) Zoltán Holanek
Video Analytics	(Hungary) Attila Kun

Source: Coaches, Management

=== Uniform ===
- Supplier: (Germany) Adidas
- Main sponsor: Audi / tippmix / OTP Bank / City of Győr
- Back sponsor: PannErgy / Győrszol
- Shorts sponsor: OMV / Leier / OIL!

== Competitions ==
=== Overview ===
Win Draw Loss

Competition	First match	Last match	Starting round	Final position	Record							
Competition	First match	Last match	Starting round	Final position	Pld	W	D	L	GF	GA	GD	Win %
Nemzeti Bajnokság I	1 September 2020	4 June 2021	Matchday 1	2nd	26	25	0	1	932	542	+390	96.15
Magyar Kupa	27 April 2021	16 May 2021	Fifth round	1st	3	3	0	0	95	75	+20	100.00
EHF Champions League	12 September 2020	30 May 2021	Group stage	3rd	20	15	4	1	637	489	+148	75.00
Total					49	43	4	2	1,664	1,106	+558	87.76

Last updated: complete
Source: Competitions

=== Nemzeti Bajnokság I ===
==== League table ====
Pos	Team	Pld	W	D	L	GF	GA	GD	Pts	Qualification or relegation
1	FTC-Rail Cargo Hungaria	26	25	0	1	892	590	+302	50 (Note: FTC-Rail Cargo Hungaria 58–55 Győri Audi ETO KC)	Qualification to Champions League group stage
2	Győri Audi ETO KC	26	25	0	1	932	542	+390	50	Qualification to Champions League group stage
3	Motherson-Mosonmagyaróvár	26	18	0	8	740	699	+41	36	Qualification to European League group stage
4	Váci NKSE	26	16	1	9	769	753	+16	33	Qualification to European League Round 3
5	DVSC SCHAEFFLER	26	15	1	10	774	717	+57	31	Qualification to European League Round 3

Source: mksz.hu
Rules for classification: 1) Points; 2) Goal difference; 3) Head-to-head points; 4) Head-to-head goal difference; 5) Goals scored; 6) Matches won; 7) Draw (Note: Head-to-head record is used only after all the matches between the teams in question have been played)

==== Results by round ====
Match	1	2	3	4	5	6	7	8	9	10	11	12	13	14	15	16	17	18	19	20	21	22	23	24	25	26
Ground	H	H	H	A	A	H	H	H	H	H	A	A	A	A	A	A	H	A	H	A	A	H	A	H	A	H
Result	W	W	W	W	W	W	W	W	W	W	W	W	W	W	W	W	W	W	W	W	L	W	W	W	W	W

Source: Matches
A = Away; H = Home; W = Win; D = Draw; L = Loss

==== Matches ====
Round 3; 1 September 2020; 18:00	Győri Audi ETO KC	35–17	Érd HC	Audi Aréna, Győr; Attendance: 2,012; Referees: Réti, Szedmák
Round 3; 1 September 2020; 18:00	three players 5	(18–9)	Király 4	Audi Aréna, Győr; Attendance: 2,012; Referees: Réti, Szedmák
Round 3; 1 September 2020; 18:00	2× (yellow card) 1× (suspension)	Report	3× (yellow card)	Audi Aréna, Győr; Attendance: 2,012; Referees: Réti, Szedmák

Round 1; 4 September 2020; 18:00	Győri Audi ETO KC	33–20	Kisvárdai KC	Audi Aréna, Győr; Attendance: 1,837; Referees: Őri, Pozdena
Round 1; 4 September 2020; 18:00	Oftedal 6	(18–8)	Mihálffy 6	Audi Aréna, Győr; Attendance: 1,837; Referees: Őri, Pozdena
Round 1; 4 September 2020; 18:00	2× (yellow card) 2× (suspension)	Report	2× (yellow card) 5× (suspension)	Audi Aréna, Győr; Attendance: 1,837; Referees: Őri, Pozdena

Round 2; 8 September 2020; 18:00	Győri Audi ETO KC	10–0	Békéscsabai Előre NKSE	Audi Aréna, Győr
Round 2; 8 September 2020; 18:00		Report		Audi Aréna, Győr

Round 4; 16 September 2020; 18:00	Szombathelyi KKA	22–43	Győri Audi ETO KC	Arena Savaria, Szombathely; Attendance: 700; Referees: Bóna, Földesi
Round 4; 16 September 2020; 18:00	Pődör 6	(20–24)	Nze Minko 8	Arena Savaria, Szombathely; Attendance: 700; Referees: Bóna, Földesi
Round 4; 16 September 2020; 18:00	3× (yellow card) 2× (suspension)	Report	1× (yellow card)	Arena Savaria, Szombathely; Attendance: 700; Referees: Bóna, Földesi

Round 6; 23 September 2020; 18:00	Siófok KC	21–30	Győri Audi ETO KC	Kiss Szilárd Sports Hall, Siófok; Attendance: 1,000; Referees: Bíró, Kiss
Round 6; 23 September 2020; 18:00	Kobetić, Pena 5	(12–14)	Lukács, Oftedal 7	Kiss Szilárd Sports Hall, Siófok; Attendance: 1,000; Referees: Bíró, Kiss
Round 6; 23 September 2020; 18:00	1× (yellow card) 3× (suspension)	Report	2× (suspension)	Kiss Szilárd Sports Hall, Siófok; Attendance: 1,000; Referees: Bíró, Kiss

Round 12; 14 October 2020; 18:15	Győri Audi ETO KC	43–19	Váci NKSE	Audi Aréna, Győr; Attendance: 1,311; Referees: Altmár, Horváth
Round 12; 14 October 2020; 18:15	Nze Minko 10	(20–11)	Kácsor 5	Audi Aréna, Győr; Attendance: 1,311; Referees: Altmár, Horváth
Round 12; 14 October 2020; 18:15	1× (yellow card) 1× (suspension)	Report	2× (yellow card) 4× (suspension)	Audi Aréna, Győr; Attendance: 1,311; Referees: Altmár, Horváth

Round 8; 3 January 2021; 15:00	Győri Audi ETO KC	44–21	Alba Fehérvár KC	Audi Aréna, Győr; Attendance: 0 Referees: Héjjas, Kránitz
Round 8; 3 January 2021; 15:00	Nze Minko 9	(22-11)	Gerháth 9	Audi Aréna, Győr; Attendance: 0 Referees: Héjjas, Kránitz
Round 8; 3 January 2021; 15:00	1× (yellow card) 1× (suspension)	Report	3× (yellow card) 1× (suspension)	Audi Aréna, Győr; Attendance: 0 Referees: Héjjas, Kránitz

Round 5; 6 January 2021; 17:30	Győri Audi ETO KC	36–25	Dunaújvárosi Kohász KA	Audi Aréna, Győr; Attendance: 0 Referees: Marton, Szabó
Round 5; 6 January 2021; 17:30	Brattset Dale, Kristiansen 6	(22–12)	Bulath 9	Audi Aréna, Győr; Attendance: 0 Referees: Marton, Szabó
Round 5; 6 January 2021; 17:30	2× (suspension)	Report	2× (yellow card) 2× (suspension)	Audi Aréna, Győr; Attendance: 0 Referees: Marton, Szabó

Round 7; 20 January 2021; 18:00	Győri Audi ETO KC	43–27	Boglári Akadémia-SZISE	Audi Aréna, Győr; Attendance: 0 Referees: Benya-Hantos, Rózsahegyi
Round 7; 20 January 2021; 18:00	Faluvégi, Nze Minko 6	(22–10)	Kajdon 7	Audi Aréna, Győr; Attendance: 0 Referees: Benya-Hantos, Rózsahegyi
Round 7; 20 January 2021; 18:00	1× (yellow card) 2× (suspension)	Report	2× (suspension)	Audi Aréna, Győr; Attendance: 0 Referees: Benya-Hantos, Rózsahegyi

Round 10; 3 February 2021; 18:00	Győri Audi ETO KC	33–27	Ferencvárosi TC	Audi Aréna, Győr; Attendance: 0 Referees: Horváth, Marton
Round 10; 3 February 2021; 18:00	Lukács 6	(14–14)	Bölk 9	Audi Aréna, Győr; Attendance: 0 Referees: Horváth, Marton
Round 10; 3 February 2021; 18:00	2× (yellow card) 2× (suspension)	Report	2× (yellow card) 1× (suspension)	Audi Aréna, Győr; Attendance: 0 Referees: Horváth, Marton

Round 11; 10 February 2021; 17:45	MTK Budapest	23–40	Győri Audi ETO KC	Elektromos Hall, Budapest; Attendance: 0 Referees: Fekete, Tóth
Round 11; 10 February 2021; 17:45	Pál 8	(10–19)	Nze Minko 6	Elektromos Hall, Budapest; Attendance: 0 Referees: Fekete, Tóth
Round 11; 10 February 2021; 17:45	2× (yellow card) 1× (suspension)	Report	3× (yellow card) 1× (suspension)	Elektromos Hall, Budapest; Attendance: 0 Referees: Fekete, Tóth

Round 20; 19 February 2021; 18:00	Boglári Akadémia-SZISE	19–38	Győri Audi ETO KC	NEKA Sports Hall, Balatonboglár; Attendance: 0 Referees: Bujdosó, Horváth
Round 20; 19 February 2021; 18:00	Farkas 4	(8–20)	Kristiansen 6	NEKA Sports Hall, Balatonboglár; Attendance: 0 Referees: Bujdosó, Horváth
Round 20; 19 February 2021; 18:00	5× (suspension)	Report	1× (yellow card) 1× (suspension)	NEKA Sports Hall, Balatonboglár; Attendance: 0 Referees: Bujdosó, Horváth

Round 13; 24 February 2021; 18:30	Mosonmagyaróvári KC SE	20–33	Győri Audi ETO KC	UFM Aréna, Mosonmagyaróvár; Attendance: 0 Referees: Paska, Vastag
Round 13; 24 February 2021; 18:30	Kovács 7	(11–22)	Kristiansen 7	UFM Aréna, Mosonmagyaróvár; Attendance: 0 Referees: Paska, Vastag
Round 13; 24 February 2021; 18:30	2× (yellow card) 3× (suspension)	Report	2× (suspension)	UFM Aréna, Mosonmagyaróvár; Attendance: 0 Referees: Paska, Vastag

Round 14; 28 February 2021; 18:00	Kisvárdai KC	12–38	Győri Audi ETO KC	Municipal Sports Hall, Kisvárda; Attendance: 0 Referees: Benya-Hantos, Rózsahegyi
Round 14; 28 February 2021; 18:00	Siska 4	(5–15)	Oftedal 7	Municipal Sports Hall, Kisvárda; Attendance: 0 Referees: Benya-Hantos, Rózsahegyi
Round 14; 28 February 2021; 18:00	2× (suspension)	Report	2× (yellow card)	Municipal Sports Hall, Kisvárda; Attendance: 0 Referees: Benya-Hantos, Rózsahegyi

Round 15; 2 March 2021; 16:00	Békéscsabai Előre NKSE	20–41	Győri Audi ETO KC	Municipal Sports Hall, Békéscsaba; Attendance: 0 Referees: Héjjas, Kránitz
Round 15; 2 March 2021; 16:00	Radojević 5	(11–21)	Faluvégi 7	Municipal Sports Hall, Békéscsaba; Attendance: 0 Referees: Héjjas, Kránitz
Round 15; 2 March 2021; 16:00	2× (yellow card) 2× (suspension)	Report	1× (yellow card) 2× (suspension)	Municipal Sports Hall, Békéscsaba; Attendance: 0 Referees: Héjjas, Kránitz

Round 18; 24 March 2021; 16:00	Dunaújvárosi Kohász KA	18–40	Győri Audi ETO KC	Audi Aréna, Győr; Attendance: 0 Referees: Sándor, Szikszay
Round 18; 24 March 2021; 16:00	Román 4	(10–24)	Faluvégi 8	Audi Aréna, Győr; Attendance: 0 Referees: Sándor, Szikszay
Round 18; 24 March 2021; 16:00	1× (yellow card) 1× (suspension)	Report	2× (yellow card) 3× (suspension)	Audi Aréna, Győr; Attendance: 0 Referees: Sándor, Szikszay

Round 17; 30 March 2021; 18:00	Győri Audi ETO KC	40–20	Szombathelyi KKA	Audi Aréna, Győr; Attendance: 0 Referees: Héjjas, Kránitz
Round 17; 30 March 2021; 18:00	Faluvégi 11	(26–9)	Agbaba 5	Audi Aréna, Győr; Attendance: 0 Referees: Héjjas, Kránitz
Round 17; 30 March 2021; 18:00	1× (suspension)	Report	1× (yellow card) 4× (suspension)	Audi Aréna, Győr; Attendance: 0 Referees: Héjjas, Kránitz

Round 16; 21 April 2021; 16:00	Érd HC	26–38	Győri Audi ETO KC	Érd Aréna, Érd; Attendance: 0 Referees: Fekete, Tóth
Round 16; 21 April 2021; 16:00	Szabó 8	(14–18)	Nze Minko 7	Érd Aréna, Érd; Attendance: 0 Referees: Fekete, Tóth
Round 16; 21 April 2021; 16:00	2× (yellow card) 2× (suspension) 1× (red card)	Report	1× (yellow card) 2× (suspension)	Érd Aréna, Érd; Attendance: 0 Referees: Fekete, Tóth

Round 19; 24 April 2021; 16:00	Győri Audi ETO KC	44–24	Siófok KC	Audi Aréna, Győr; Attendance: 0 Referees: Medve, Südi
Round 19; 24 April 2021; 16:00	Faluvégi 8	(19–13)	Kiss 9	Audi Aréna, Győr; Attendance: 0 Referees: Medve, Südi
Round 19; 24 April 2021; 16:00	2× (yellow card) 1× (suspension)	Report	1× (yellow card) 1× (suspension)	Audi Aréna, Győr; Attendance: 0 Referees: Medve, Südi

Round 21; 30 April 2021; 18:00	Alba Fehérvár KC	25–40	Győri Audi ETO KC	KÖFÉM Sports Hall, Székesfehérvár; Attendance: 0 Referees: Marton, Szabó
Round 21; 30 April 2021; 18:00	Afentáler 10	(10–18)	Amorim, Nze Minko 6	KÖFÉM Sports Hall, Székesfehérvár; Attendance: 0 Referees: Marton, Szabó
Round 21; 30 April 2021; 18:00	2× (yellow card) 1× (suspension)	Report	2× (yellow card) 1× (suspension)	KÖFÉM Sports Hall, Székesfehérvár; Attendance: 0 Referees: Marton, Szabó

Round 23; 5 May 2021; 16:00	Ferencvárosi TC	31–22	Győri Audi ETO KC	Elek Gyula Aréna, Budapest; Attendance: 300; Referees: Andorka, Hucker
Round 23; 5 May 2021; 16:00	Malestein 10	(17–11)	Kristiansen 5	Elek Gyula Aréna, Budapest; Attendance: 300; Referees: Andorka, Hucker
Round 23; 5 May 2021; 16:00	1× (yellow card) 1× (suspension)	Report	2× (yellow card) 5× (suspension)	Elek Gyula Aréna, Budapest; Attendance: 300; Referees: Andorka, Hucker

Round 22; 8 May 2021; 16:00	Győri Audi ETO KC	41–23	DVSC Schaeffler	Audi Aréna, Győr; Attendance: 917; Referees: Altmár, Horváth
Round 22; 8 May 2021; 16:00	Brattset Dale 9	(19–13)	Hornyák 4	Audi Aréna, Győr; Attendance: 917; Referees: Altmár, Horváth
Round 22; 8 May 2021; 16:00	1× (suspension)	Report	1× (yellow card) 4× (suspension)	Audi Aréna, Győr; Attendance: 917; Referees: Altmár, Horváth

Round 25; 20 May 2021; 18:00	Váci NKSE	21–36	Győri Audi ETO KC	Vác Városi Sportcsarnok, Vác; Attendance: 400; Referees: Benya-Hantos, Rózsahegyi
Round 25; 20 May 2021; 18:00	Bárdy, Szabó 5	(10–21)	Nze Minko 8	Vác Városi Sportcsarnok, Vác; Attendance: 400; Referees: Benya-Hantos, Rózsahegyi
Round 25; 20 May 2021; 18:00	1× (suspension)	Report	2× (yellow card) 3× (suspension)	Vác Városi Sportcsarnok, Vác; Attendance: 400; Referees: Benya-Hantos, Rózsahegyi

Round 24; 22 May 2021; 15:00	Győri Audi ETO KC	33–21	MTK Budapest	Audi Aréna, Győr; Attendance: 1,022; Referees: Paska, Vastag
Round 24; 22 May 2021; 15:00	Lukács 6	(16–15)	Marincsák 4	Audi Aréna, Győr; Attendance: 1,022; Referees: Paska, Vastag
Round 24; 22 May 2021; 15:00	1× (yellow card)	Report	2× (yellow card) 2× (suspension)	Audi Aréna, Győr; Attendance: 1,022; Referees: Paska, Vastag

Round 9; 2 June 2021; 17:00	DVSC-Schaeffler	20–32	Győri Audi ETO KC	Hódos Imre Sportcsarnok, Debrecen; Referees: Hargitai, Markó
Round 9; 2 June 2021; 17:00	Kovács 5	(10–18)	A. M. Hansen 9	Hódos Imre Sportcsarnok, Debrecen; Referees: Hargitai, Markó
Round 9; 2 June 2021; 17:00	3× (yellow card) 1× (suspension)	Report	1× (yellow card) 2× (suspension)	Hódos Imre Sportcsarnok, Debrecen; Referees: Hargitai, Markó

Round 26; 4 June 2021; 17:00	Győri Audi ETO KC	26–20	Mosonmagyaróvári KC SE	Audi Aréna, Győr; Attendance: 3,813; Referees: Marton, Szabó
Round 26; 4 June 2021; 17:00	Amorim, Kristiansen 4	(15–10)	Stranigg 8	Audi Aréna, Győr; Attendance: 3,813; Referees: Marton, Szabó
Round 26; 4 June 2021; 17:00	1× (yellow card) 1× (suspension)	Report	1× (yellow card) 2× (suspension)	Audi Aréna, Győr; Attendance: 3,813; Referees: Marton, Szabó

==== Results overview ====
Opposition	Home score	Away score	Double
Alba Fehérvár KC	44–21	25–40	84–46
EUbility Group-Békéscsaba	10–0	20–41	51–20
Boglári Akadémia-SZISE	43–27	19–38	81–46
DVSC Schaeffler	41–23	20–32	73–43
Dunaújvárosi Kohász KA	36–25	18–40	76–43
Érd	35–17	26–38	73–43
FTC-Rail Cargo Hungaria	33–27	31–22	55–58
Kisvárda Master Good SE	33–20	12–38	71–32
MTK Budapest	33–21	23–40	73–44
Motherson-Mosonmagyaróvár	26–20	20–33	59–40
Siófok KC	44–24	21–30	74–45
Hungast-Szombathelyi KKA	40–20	22–43	83–42
Váci NKSE	43–19	21–36	79–40

=== Hungarian Cup ===
==== Round 5 ====
Round 5; 27 April 2021; 16:00	Győri Audi ETO KC	37–27	MTK Budapest	Audi Aréna, Győr; Attendance: 0 Referees: Rontó, Szanyi
Round 5; 27 April 2021; 16:00	Amorim, Kristiansen 6	(21–18)	Pál 6	Audi Aréna, Győr; Attendance: 0 Referees: Rontó, Szanyi
Round 5; 27 April 2021; 16:00	1× (yellow card) 1× (suspension)	Report	1× (yellow card) 4× (suspension)	Audi Aréna, Győr; Attendance: 0 Referees: Rontó, Szanyi

==== Semi-final ====
Semi-final; 15 May 2021; 16:45	Győri Audi ETO KC	29–25	Ferencvárosi TC	Veszprém Aréna, Veszprém; Attendance: 1,000; Referees: Bíró, Kiss
Semi-final; 15 May 2021; 16:45	Oftedal 7	(13–16)	Klujber 7	Veszprém Aréna, Veszprém; Attendance: 1,000; Referees: Bíró, Kiss
Semi-final; 15 May 2021; 16:45	4× (suspension)	Report	1× (yellow card) 4× (suspension)	Veszprém Aréna, Veszprém; Attendance: 1,000; Referees: Bíró, Kiss

==== Final ====
Final; 16 May 2021; 18:15	Győri Audi ETO KC	29–23	DVSC–Schaeffler	Veszprém Aréna, Veszprém; Attendance: 1,000; Referees: Medve, Südi
Final; 16 May 2021; 18:15	Oftedal 6	(13–15)	A. Kovács 12	Veszprém Aréna, Veszprém; Attendance: 1,000; Referees: Medve, Südi
Final; 16 May 2021; 18:15	3× (yellow card) 1× (suspension)	Report	4× (suspension)	Veszprém Aréna, Veszprém; Attendance: 1,000; Referees: Medve, Südi

=== EHF Champions League ===
==== Group stage ====
Pos	Team	Pld	W	D	L	GF	GA	GD	Pts	GYO	MOS	BRE	ODE	BUD	VAL	DOR	KOP
1	(Hungary) Győri Audi ETO KC	14	10	4	0	457	353	+104	24	—	31–24	27–27	32–25	34–29	38–31	38–25	43–28
2	(Russia) CSKA Moscow	14	11	1	2	404	350	+54	23	27–27	—	25–24	27–23	27–23	30–20	35–28	30–26
3	(France) Brest Bretagne Handball	14	6	5	3	384	349	+35	17	25–25	28–30	—	32–21	28–28	28–21	33–33	32–25
4	(Denmark) Odense Håndbold	14	6	1	7	384	370	+14	13	32–32	26–25	24–31	—	30–21	25–26	32–27	35–20
5	(Montenegro) Budućnost	14	5	2	7	363	377	−14	12	21–26	22–25	22–22	27–24	—	29–28	31–27	33–26
6	(Romania) SCM Râmnicu Vâlcea	14	5	0	9	263	319	−56	10	20–37	24–34	10–0	21–30	25–23	—	0–10	0–10
7	(Germany) Borussia Dortmund	14	4	1	9	347	391	−44	9	24–34	28–29	29–41	32–24	26–28	0–10	—	32–31
8	(Croatia) HC Podravka Vegeta	14	2	0	12	326	419	−93	4	15–33	20–26	29–33	17–33	29–26	25–27	25–26	—

Source: EHF
Rules for classification: Tiebreakers

===== Matches =====
12 September 2020; 16:00	CSKA Moscow (Russia)	27–27	Győri Audi ETO KC	Alexander Gomelsky Universal Sports Hall CSKA, Moscow; Attendance: 526; Referees: Covalciuc, Covalciuc (MDA)
12 September 2020; 16:00	Mikhaylichenko 7	(14–14)	Kristiansen 7	Alexander Gomelsky Universal Sports Hall CSKA, Moscow; Attendance: 526; Referees: Covalciuc, Covalciuc (MDA)
12 September 2020; 16:00	1× (yellow card) 2× (suspension)	Report	2× (yellow card) 4× (suspension)	Alexander Gomelsky Universal Sports Hall CSKA, Moscow; Attendance: 526; Referees: Covalciuc, Covalciuc (MDA)

19 September 2020; 16:00	Győri Audi ETO KC	43–28	(Croatia) Podravka Vegeta	Audi Aréna, Győr; Attendance: 1,882; Referees: Lidacka, Lesiak (POL)
19 September 2020; 16:00	Oftedal 8	(17–16)	Carlos, Milosavljević 8	Audi Aréna, Győr; Attendance: 1,882; Referees: Lidacka, Lesiak (POL)
19 September 2020; 16:00	1× (yellow card) 5× (suspension)	Report	2× (yellow card) 5× (suspension)	Audi Aréna, Győr; Attendance: 1,882; Referees: Lidacka, Lesiak (POL)

27 September 2020; 16:00	Brest Bretagne Handball (France)	25–25	Győri Audi ETO KC	Brest Arena, Brest; Attendance: 3,500; Referees: Doychinov, Goretsov (BUL)
27 September 2020; 16:00	Gros 9	(12–12)	three players 4	Brest Arena, Brest; Attendance: 3,500; Referees: Doychinov, Goretsov (BUL)
27 September 2020; 16:00	1× (yellow card) 2× (suspension)	Report	3× (yellow card) 3× (suspension)	Brest Arena, Brest; Attendance: 3,500; Referees: Doychinov, Goretsov (BUL)

10 October 2020; 18:00	Győri Audi ETO KC	32–25	(Denmark) Odense Håndbold	Audi Aréna, Győr; Attendance: 2,631; Referees: Nastase, Stancu (ROU)
10 October 2020; 18:00	Kristiansen 7	(16–11)	Abbingh 7	Audi Aréna, Győr; Attendance: 2,631; Referees: Nastase, Stancu (ROU)
10 October 2020; 18:00	1× (yellow card) 2× (suspension)	Report	2× (yellow card) 3× (suspension)	Audi Aréna, Győr; Attendance: 2,631; Referees: Nastase, Stancu (ROU)

17 October 2020; 18:00	Győri Audi ETO KC	38–31	(Romania) SCM Râmnicu Vâlcea	Audi Aréna, Győr; Attendance: 2,257; Referees: Rozhkov, Novikov (UKR)
17 October 2020; 18:00	Nze Minko 10	(15–17)	González 8	Audi Aréna, Győr; Attendance: 2,257; Referees: Rozhkov, Novikov (UKR)
17 October 2020; 18:00	2× (yellow card) 2× (suspension)	Report	1× (yellow card) 4× (suspension)	Audi Aréna, Győr; Attendance: 2,257; Referees: Rozhkov, Novikov (UKR)

6 November 2020; 18:30	Borussia Dortmund (Germany)	24–34	Győri Audi ETO KC	Audi Aréna, Győr; Attendance: 987; Referees: Vranes, Wenninger (AUT)
6 November 2020; 18:30	Gutiérrez 6	(11–19)	Amorim 7	Audi Aréna, Győr; Attendance: 987; Referees: Vranes, Wenninger (AUT)
6 November 2020; 18:30	1× (yellow card) 4× (suspension)	Report	1× (yellow card) 1× (suspension)	Audi Aréna, Győr; Attendance: 987; Referees: Vranes, Wenninger (AUT)

8 November 2020; 14:00	Győri Audi ETO KC	38–25	(Germany) Borussia Dortmund	Audi Aréna, Győr; Attendance: 969; Referees: Mosorinski, Pandzic (SRB)
8 November 2020; 14:00	Amorim, Oftedal 6	(19–11)	Abdulla, Bleckmann 5	Audi Aréna, Győr; Attendance: 969; Referees: Mosorinski, Pandzic (SRB)
8 November 2020; 14:00	1× (yellow card) 1× (suspension)	Report	2× (yellow card) 2× (suspension)	Audi Aréna, Győr; Attendance: 969; Referees: Mosorinski, Pandzic (SRB)

21 November 2020; 18:00	Győri Audi ETO KC	34–29	(Montenegro) ŽRK Budućnost	Audi Aréna, Győr; Attendance: 0 Referees: Antić, Jakovljević (SRB)
21 November 2020; 18:00	Oftedal 10	(18–16)	Lekić 11	Audi Aréna, Győr; Attendance: 0 Referees: Antić, Jakovljević (SRB)
21 November 2020; 18:00	2× (yellow card) 1× (suspension)	Report	1× (yellow card) 4× (suspension) 1× (red card)	Audi Aréna, Győr; Attendance: 0 Referees: Antić, Jakovljević (SRB)

10 January 2021; 18:00	SCM Râmnicu Vâlcea (Romania)	20–37	Győri Audi ETO KC	Traian Sports Hall, Râmnicu Vâlcea; Attendance: 0 Referees: Antić, Jakovljević (SRB)
10 January 2021; 18:00	Minevskaja 4	(12-19)	Kristiansen 9	Traian Sports Hall, Râmnicu Vâlcea; Attendance: 0 Referees: Antić, Jakovljević (SRB)
10 January 2021; 18:00	2× (yellow card) 2× (suspension)	Report	2× (yellow card) 2× (suspension)	Traian Sports Hall, Râmnicu Vâlcea; Attendance: 0 Referees: Antić, Jakovljević (SRB)

17 January 2021; 16:00	Odense Håndbold (Denmark)	32–32	Győri Audi ETO KC	Odense Sports Park, Odense; Attendance: 0 Referees: Sá, Sá (POR)
17 January 2021; 16:00	Abbingh 11	(18–17)	Amorim 7	Odense Sports Park, Odense; Attendance: 0 Referees: Sá, Sá (POR)
17 January 2021; 16:00	2× (yellow card) 2× (suspension)	Report	1× (yellow card) 2× (suspension)	Odense Sports Park, Odense; Attendance: 0 Referees: Sá, Sá (POR)

23 January 2021; 18:00	Győri Audi ETO KC	27–27	(France) Brest Bretagne Handball	Audi Aréna, Győr; Attendance: 0 Referees: Vranes, Wenninger (AUT)
23 January 2021; 18:00	Amorim, Kristiansen 7	(15–15)	Gros, Lassource 5	Audi Aréna, Győr; Attendance: 0 Referees: Vranes, Wenninger (AUT)
23 January 2021; 18:00	4× (suspension)	Report	1× (yellow card) 5× (suspension)	Audi Aréna, Győr; Attendance: 0 Referees: Vranes, Wenninger (AUT)

29 January 2021; 19:00	ŽRK Budućnost (Montenegro)	21–26	Győri Audi ETO KC	Bemax Arena, Podgorica; Attendance: 0 Referees: Hatipoğlu, Şimşek (TUR)
29 January 2021; 19:00	Radičević 6	(8–14)	Nze Minko 6	Bemax Arena, Podgorica; Attendance: 0 Referees: Hatipoğlu, Şimşek (TUR)
29 January 2021; 19:00	2× (yellow card) 4× (suspension)	Report	2× (yellow card) 3× (suspension)	Bemax Arena, Podgorica; Attendance: 0 Referees: Hatipoğlu, Şimşek (TUR)

6 February 2021; 18:00	Podravka Vegeta (Croatia)	15–33	Győri Audi ETO KC	Gimnazija "Fran Galović", Koprivnica; Attendance: 0 Referees: Christidi, Papamattheou (GRE)
6 February 2021; 18:00	Tsàkalou 7	(8–13)	Kristiansen, Nze Minko 6	Gimnazija "Fran Galović", Koprivnica; Attendance: 0 Referees: Christidi, Papamattheou (GRE)
6 February 2021; 18:00	1× (yellow card) 4× (suspension)	Report	1× (yellow card) 2× (suspension)	Gimnazija "Fran Galović", Koprivnica; Attendance: 0 Referees: Christidi, Papamattheou (GRE)

13 February 2021; 18:00	Győri Audi ETO KC	31–24	(Russia) CSKA Moscow	Audi Aréna, Győr; Attendance: 0 Referees: Ciulei, Stoia (ROU)
13 February 2021; 18:00	Lukács 7	(14–13)	Ilina, Vedekhina 4	Audi Aréna, Győr; Attendance: 0 Referees: Ciulei, Stoia (ROU)
13 February 2021; 18:00	1× (yellow card)	Report	3× (yellow card) 4× (suspension)	Audi Aréna, Győr; Attendance: 0 Referees: Ciulei, Stoia (ROU)

===== Results overview =====
Opposition	Home score	Away score	Double
(Romania) SCM Râmnicu Vâlcea	38–31	20–37	75–51
(Montenegro) ŽRK Budućnost	34–29	21–26	60–50
(Germany) Borussia Dortmund	38–25	24–34	72–49
(Russia) CSKA Moscow	31–24	27–27	58–51
(France) Brest Bretagne Handball	27–27	25–25	52–52
(Denmark) Odense Håndbold	32–25	32–32	64–57
(Croatia) Podravka Vegeta	43–28	15–33	76–43

==== Knockout stage ====
===== Play-offs =====
7 March 2021; 14:00	SG BBM Bietigheim (Germany)	20–37	Győri Audi ETO KC	Arena Ludwigsburg, Ludwigsburg; Attendance: 0 Referees: Capoccia, Jucker (SUI)
7 March 2021; 14:00	Maidhof 6	(8–18)	Görbicz, Kristiansen 6	Arena Ludwigsburg, Ludwigsburg; Attendance: 0 Referees: Capoccia, Jucker (SUI)
7 March 2021; 14:00	2× (yellow card) 3× (suspension)	Report	1× (yellow card) 2× (suspension)	Arena Ludwigsburg, Ludwigsburg; Attendance: 0 Referees: Capoccia, Jucker (SUI)

13 March 2021; 16:00	Győri Audi ETO KC	32–28	(Germany) SG BBM Bietigheim	Audi Aréna, Győr; Attendance: 0 Referees: Praštalo, Balvan (BIH)
13 March 2021; 16:00	Nze Minko 6	(19–16)	Naidzavinivius 7	Audi Aréna, Győr; Attendance: 0 Referees: Praštalo, Balvan (BIH)
13 March 2021; 16:00	1× (yellow card) 2× (suspension)	Report	2× (yellow card) 3× (suspension)	Audi Aréna, Győr; Attendance: 0 Referees: Praštalo, Balvan (BIH)

===== Quarter-finals =====
3 April 2021; 18:00	ŽRK Budućnost (Montenegro)	19–30	Győri Audi ETO KC	Bemax Hall, Podgorica; Attendance: 0 Referees: Christidi, Papamattheou (GRE)
3 April 2021; 18:00	Pineau, Radičević 5	(11–16)	Oftedal 9	Bemax Hall, Podgorica; Attendance: 0 Referees: Christidi, Papamattheou (GRE)
3 April 2021; 18:00	3× (yellow card) 3× (suspension)	Report	1× (yellow card) 3× (suspension)	Bemax Hall, Podgorica; Attendance: 0 Referees: Christidi, Papamattheou (GRE)

10 April 2021; 18:00	Győri Audi ETO KC	24–21	(Montenegro) ŽRK Budućnost	Audi Aréna, Győr; Attendance: 0 Referees: Vranes, Wenninger (AUT)
10 April 2021; 18:00	four players 4	(10–11)	Radičević 7	Audi Aréna, Győr; Attendance: 0 Referees: Vranes, Wenninger (AUT)
10 April 2021; 18:00	2× (yellow card) 2× (suspension)	Report	2× (yellow card) 5× (suspension)	Audi Aréna, Győr; Attendance: 0 Referees: Vranes, Wenninger (AUT)

===== Semi-final =====
29 May 2021; 15:15	Győri Audi ETO KC	25–27	(France) Brest Bretagne Handball	László Papp Budapest Sports Arena, Budapest; Attendance: 2,500; Referees: Sá, Sá (POR)
29 May 2021; 15:15	Kristiansen 8	(8–11)	Gros 9	László Papp Budapest Sports Arena, Budapest; Attendance: 2,500; Referees: Sá, Sá (POR)
29 May 2021; 15:15	4× (suspension)	Report	5× (suspension)	László Papp Budapest Sports Arena, Budapest; Attendance: 2,500; Referees: Sá, Sá (POR)

===== Bronze-match =====
30 May 2021; 15:15	Győri Audi ETO KC	32–21	(Russia) CSKA Moscow	László Papp Budapest Sports Arena, Budapest; Attendance: 2,300; Referees: Christidi, Papamattheou (GRE)
30 May 2021; 15:15	Oftedal 8	(18–8)	Mikhaylichenko 4	László Papp Budapest Sports Arena, Budapest; Attendance: 2,300; Referees: Christidi, Papamattheou (GRE)
30 May 2021; 15:15	2× (yellow card) 4× (suspension)	Report	1× (yellow card) 4× (suspension)	László Papp Budapest Sports Arena, Budapest; Attendance: 2,300; Referees: Christidi, Papamattheou (GRE)

== Statistics ==
=== Top scorers ===
Includes all competitive matches. The list is sorted by shirt number when total goals are equal.

Last updated on 4 June 2021

Position	Nation	No.	Name	Hungarian League	Hungarian Cup	Champions League	Total
1	(France)	27	Estelle Nze Minko	127	9	84	220
2	(Norway)	21	Veronica Kristiansen	99	12	97	208
3	(Norway)	15	Stine Bredal Oftedal	98	14	87	199
4	(Hungary)	22	Viktória Lukács	86	3	68	157
5	(Norway)	7	Kari Brattset Dale	83	10	52	145
6	(Brazil)	18	Eduarda Amorim	67	10	58	135
7	(Hungary)	48	Dorottya Faluvégi	90	7	29	126
8	(Hungary)	23	Csenge Fodor	79	7	30	116
9	(Denmark)	8	Anne Mette Hansen	68	10	33	111
10	(Hungary)	13	Anita Görbicz	42	10	57	109
11	(France)	2	Béatrice Edwige	40	2	24	66
12	(Norway)	24	Amanda Kurtović *	19	0	13	32
13	(Hungary)	14	Brigitta Csekő	11	0	0	11
14	(Hungary)	5	Laura Kürthi	4	0	2	6
15	(Hungary)	4	Eszter Ogonovszky	4	0	1	5
16	(Hungary)	19	Diána Világos	3	0	0	3
17	(France)	12	Amandine Leynaud	0	0	2	2
18	(Norway)	16	Silje Solberg	1	1	0	2
19	(France)	1	Laura Glauser	1	0	0	1
			TOTALS	932	95	637	1,664

- * Player left the team during the season.

=== Attendances ===
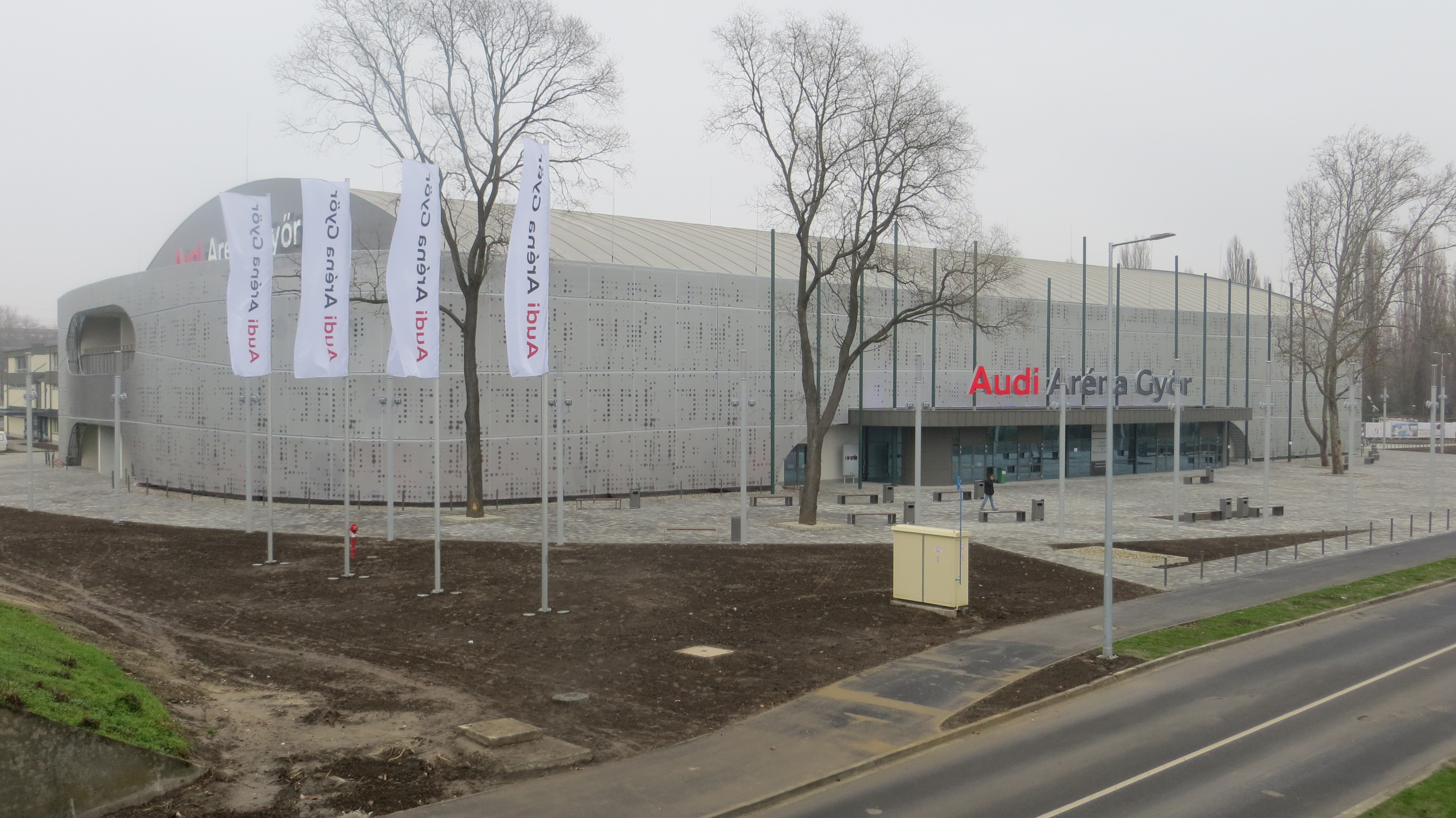
Home hall: Audi Aréna

List of the home matches:

Round	Against	Attendance	Capatility	Date
NB I- 3.	Érd	2,012	36,6%	September 1, 2020
NB I- 1.	Kisvárda	1,837	33,4%	September 4, 2020
CL-(GS) 2.	Koprivnica (Croatia)	1,882	34,2%	September 19, 2020
CL-(GS) 4.	Odense (Denmark)	2,631	47,8%	October 11, 2020
NB I- 12.	Vác	1,311	23,8%	October 14, 2020
CL-(GS) 5.	Râmnicu Vâlcea (Romania)	2,257	41,0%	October 17, 2020
CL-(GS) 7.	Dortmund (Germany)	987	17,9%	November 6, 2020
CL-(GS) 8.	Dortmund (Germany)	969	17,6%	November 8, 2020
