= 2020–21 Women's EHF Champions League group stage =

The 2020–21 Women's EHF Champions League group stage began on 12 September 2020 and concluded on 14 February 2021. On 10 February 2021, after a decision by the EHF Executive Committee, it was announced that all 16 teams would advance to the knockout stage. The matches which could not be played were assessed.

== Draw ==
The draw was held on 1 July 2020 in Vienna, Austria.

=== Seeding ===
The composition of the seeding pots for the group stage draw was announced on 22 June 2020. From each pot, two teams were drawn into Group A and the other two in Group B. Teams from the same national association were not drawn into the same group.

Seeding pots for Groups A and B
Pot 1	Pot 2	Pot 3	Pot 4
(Hungary) Győri Audi ETO KC (Russia) Rostov-Don (France) Metz Handball (Romania) SCM Râmnicu Vâlcea	(Montenegro) Budućnost (Denmark) Team Esbjerg (Norway) Vipers Kristiansand (Germany) Borussia Dortmund	(Russia) CSKA Moscow (Hungary) FTC-Rail Cargo Hungaria (France) Brest Bretagne Handball (Romania) CSM Bucureşti	(Slovenia) RK Krim Merkator (Croatia) HC Podravka Vegeta (Denmark) Odense Håndbold (Germany) SG BBM Bietigheim

== Format ==
In each group, teams played against each other in a double round-robin format, with home and away matches.

== Tiebreakers ==
In the group stage, teams are ranked according to points (2 points for a win, 1 point for a draw, 0 points for a loss). After completion of the group stage, if two or more teams have the same number of points, the ranking is determined as follows:

1. Highest number of points in matches between the teams directly involved;
2. Superior goal difference in matches between the teams directly involved;
3. Highest number of goals scored in matches between the teams directly involved (or in the away match in case of a two-team tie);
4. Superior goal difference in all matches of the group;
5. Highest number of plus goals in all matches of the group;

If the ranking of one of these teams is determined, the above criteria are consecutively followed until the ranking of all teams is determined. If no ranking can be determined, a decision shall be obtained by EHF through drawing of lots.

== Groups ==
The matchdays were 12–13 September, 19–20 September, 26–27 September, 10–11 October, 17–18 October, 24–25 October, 7–8 November, 14–15 November, 21–22 November 2020, 9–10 January, 16–17 January, 23–24 January, 6–7 February, 13–14 February 2021.

Times until 25 October 2020 are UTC+2, from 26 October 2020 on times are UTC+1.

Due to the COVID-19 pandemic, each local health department allows a different number of spectators.

All matches ending with a 10–0 results were assessed by the EHF.

=== Group A ===
Pos	Team	Pld	W	D	L	GF	GA	GD	Pts
1	(Russia) Rostov-Don	14	10	1	3	331	308	+23	21
2	(France) Metz Handball	14	10	0	4	389	354	+35	20
3	(Romania) CSM Bucureşti	14	8	1	5	331	309	+22	17
4	(Hungary) FTC-Rail Cargo Hungaria	14	8	0	6	386	378	+8	16 (Note: FTC-Rail Cargo Hungaria 61–54 Vipers Kristiansand)
5	(Norway) Vipers Kristiansand	14	7	2	5	327	320	+7	16
6	(Denmark) Team Esbjerg	14	5	2	7	374	351	+23	12
7	(Slovenia) RK Krim Mercator	14	2	3	9	325	375	−50	7
8	(Germany) SG BBM Bietigheim	14	1	1	12	318	386	−68	3

Source: EHF
Rules for classification: Tiebreakers
Notes:

12 September 2020; 18:00	FTC-Rail Cargo Hungaria (Hungary)	25–26	(Russia) Rostov-Don	Érd Aréna, Érd; Attendance: 800; Referees: Baďura, Ondogrecula (SVK)
12 September 2020; 18:00	Klujber 7	(12–16)	Vyakhireva 6	Érd Aréna, Érd; Attendance: 800; Referees: Baďura, Ondogrecula (SVK)
12 September 2020; 18:00	2× (yellow card) 3× (suspension)	Report	1× (yellow card) 4× (suspension)	Érd Aréna, Érd; Attendance: 800; Referees: Baďura, Ondogrecula (SVK)

12 September 2020; 18:00	RK Krim Mercator (Slovenia)	26–27	(Norway) Vipers Kristiansand	Arena Stožice, Ljubljana; Attendance: 0 (Note: The match was played behind closed doors due to the COVID-19 pandemic.); Referees: Hurich, Bolic (AUT)
12 September 2020; 18:00	Vieira 8	(9–14)	Løke 9	Arena Stožice, Ljubljana; Attendance: 0 Referees: Hurich, Bolic (AUT)
12 September 2020; 18:00	1× (yellow card) 5× (suspension)	Report	1× (yellow card) 4× (suspension)	Arena Stožice, Ljubljana; Attendance: 0 Referees: Hurich, Bolic (AUT)

13 September 2020; 14:00	SG BBM Bietigheim (Germany)	26–33	(Denmark) Team Esbjerg	Arena Ludwigsburg, Ludwigsburg; Attendance: 350; Referees: Lindenbaum, Laron (ISR)
13 September 2020; 14:00	Maidhof 5	(12–19)	Røsberg Jacobsen 8	Arena Ludwigsburg, Ludwigsburg; Attendance: 350; Referees: Lindenbaum, Laron (ISR)
13 September 2020; 14:00	2× (yellow card) 2× (suspension)	Report	2× (yellow card) 1× (suspension)	Arena Ludwigsburg, Ludwigsburg; Attendance: 350; Referees: Lindenbaum, Laron (ISR)

13 September 2020; 16:00	CSM Bucureşti (Romania)	31–26	(France) Metz Handball	Polyvalent Hall, Bucharest; Attendance: 0 Referees: Jurinović, Mrvica (CRO)
13 September 2020; 16:00	Neagu 12	(17–10)	Peredery, Stanko 4	Polyvalent Hall, Bucharest; Attendance: 0 Referees: Jurinović, Mrvica (CRO)
13 September 2020; 16:00	3× (yellow card) 5× (suspension)	Report	2× (yellow card) 3× (suspension)	Polyvalent Hall, Bucharest; Attendance: 0 Referees: Jurinović, Mrvica (CRO)

19 September 2020; 16:00	Rostov-Don (Russia)	23–23	(Slovenia) RK Krim Mercator	Rostov-on-Don Palace of Sports, Rostov-on-Don; Attendance: 1,400; Referees: Kulik, Nabokau (BLR)
19 September 2020; 16:00	Vyakhireva 10	(12–14)	Vieira 9	Rostov-on-Don Palace of Sports, Rostov-on-Don; Attendance: 1,400; Referees: Kulik, Nabokau (BLR)
19 September 2020; 16:00	2× (yellow card) 2× (suspension)	Report	4× (yellow card) 3× (suspension)	Rostov-on-Don Palace of Sports, Rostov-on-Don; Attendance: 1,400; Referees: Kulik, Nabokau (BLR)

20 September 2020; 14:00	Metz Handball (France)	36–27	(Germany) SG BBM Bietigheim	Arènes de Metz, Metz; Attendance: 2,352; Referees: Sá, Sá (POR)
20 September 2020; 14:00	Peredery 11	(18–8)	Maidhof 8	Arènes de Metz, Metz; Attendance: 2,352; Referees: Sá, Sá (POR)
20 September 2020; 14:00	2× (yellow card) 5× (suspension)	Report	1× (yellow card) 2× (suspension)	Arènes de Metz, Metz; Attendance: 2,352; Referees: Sá, Sá (POR)

20 September 2020; 14:00	Team Esbjerg (Denmark)	29–30	(Romania) CSM Bucureşti	Blue Water Dokken, Esbjerg; Attendance: 450; Referees: Geraets, Geraets (NED)
20 September 2020; 14:00	Frey 7	(15–17)	Neagu 10	Blue Water Dokken, Esbjerg; Attendance: 450; Referees: Geraets, Geraets (NED)
20 September 2020; 14:00	1× (yellow card) 2× (suspension)	Report	2× (yellow card) 3× (suspension)	Blue Water Dokken, Esbjerg; Attendance: 450; Referees: Geraets, Geraets (NED)

26 September 2020; 18:00	SG BBM Bietigheim (Germany)	29–33	(Norway) Vipers Kristiansand	Arena Ludwigsburg, Ludwigsburg; Attendance: 420; Referees: Brunner, Salah (SUI)
26 September 2020; 18:00	Lauenroth 8	(14–15)	Mørk 9	Arena Ludwigsburg, Ludwigsburg; Attendance: 420; Referees: Brunner, Salah (SUI)
26 September 2020; 18:00	1× (yellow card) 1× (suspension)	Report	1× (yellow card) 4× (suspension) 1× (red card)	Arena Ludwigsburg, Ludwigsburg; Attendance: 420; Referees: Brunner, Salah (SUI)

10 October 2020; 16:00	Metz Handball (France)	33–27	(Slovenia) RK Krim Mercator	Arènes de Metz, Metz; Attendance: 2,648; Referees: Papamattheou, Christidi (GRE)
10 October 2020; 16:00	Stanko 8	(19–11)	Pletikosić, Sercien-Ugolin 6	Arènes de Metz, Metz; Attendance: 2,648; Referees: Papamattheou, Christidi (GRE)
10 October 2020; 16:00	2× (yellow card) 4× (suspension)	Report	3× (yellow card) 3× (suspension)	Arènes de Metz, Metz; Attendance: 2,648; Referees: Papamattheou, Christidi (GRE)

10 October 2020; 18:00	Vipers Kristiansand (Norway)	30–25	(Romania) CSM Bucureşti	Aquarama Kristiansand, Kristiansand; Attendance: 200; Referees: Līcis, Sondors (LAT)
10 October 2020; 18:00	Arntzen 6	(14–12)	Lazović, Pintea 7	Aquarama Kristiansand, Kristiansand; Attendance: 200; Referees: Līcis, Sondors (LAT)
10 October 2020; 18:00	2× (yellow card) 3× (suspension)	Report	3× (yellow card) 7× (suspension)	Aquarama Kristiansand, Kristiansand; Attendance: 200; Referees: Līcis, Sondors (LAT)

11 October 2020; 14:00	Team Esbjerg (Denmark)	21–24	(Hungary) FTC-Rail Cargo Hungaria	Blue Water Dokken, Esbjerg; Attendance: 450; Referees: Simone, Monitillo (ITA)
11 October 2020; 14:00	six players 3	(13–9)	Kovacsics 6	Blue Water Dokken, Esbjerg; Attendance: 450; Referees: Simone, Monitillo (ITA)
11 October 2020; 14:00	2× (yellow card) 2× (suspension)	Report	1× (yellow card) 4× (suspension)	Blue Water Dokken, Esbjerg; Attendance: 450; Referees: Simone, Monitillo (ITA)

11 October 2020; 14:00	SG BBM Bietigheim (Germany)	31–32	(Russia) Rostov-Don	Arena Ludwigsburg, Ludwigsburg; Attendance: 0 Referees: Carmaux, Mursch (FRA)
11 October 2020; 14:00	Lauenroth 7	(16–17)	Sen 8	Arena Ludwigsburg, Ludwigsburg; Attendance: 0 Referees: Carmaux, Mursch (FRA)
11 October 2020; 14:00	1× (yellow card) 5× (suspension)	Report	1× (yellow card) 4× (suspension)	Arena Ludwigsburg, Ludwigsburg; Attendance: 0 Referees: Carmaux, Mursch (FRA)

17 October 2020; 16:00	Rostov-Don (Russia)	30–26	(France) Metz Handball	Rostov-on-Don Palace of Sports, Rostov-on-Don; Attendance: 1,050; Referees: Mitrović, Kažanegra (MNE)
17 October 2020; 16:00	three players 5	(16–12)	Nocandy 6	Rostov-on-Don Palace of Sports, Rostov-on-Don; Attendance: 1,050; Referees: Mitrović, Kažanegra (MNE)
17 October 2020; 16:00	2× (yellow card) 3× (suspension)	Report	5× (suspension)	Rostov-on-Don Palace of Sports, Rostov-on-Don; Attendance: 1,050; Referees: Mitrović, Kažanegra (MNE)

17 October 2020; 16:00	RK Krim Mercator (Slovenia)	28–26	(Germany) SG BBM Bietigheim	Arena Stožice, Ljubljana; Attendance: 0 Referees: Antić, Jakovljević (SLO)
17 October 2020; 16:00	Sercien-Ugolin 7	(12–16)	Naidzinavicius 7	Arena Stožice, Ljubljana; Attendance: 0 Referees: Antić, Jakovljević (SLO)
17 October 2020; 16:00	2× (yellow card) 2× (suspension)	Report	2× (yellow card) 3× (suspension)	Arena Stožice, Ljubljana; Attendance: 0 Referees: Antić, Jakovljević (SLO)

18 October 2020; 14:00	Team Esbjerg (Denmark)	27–27	(Norway) Vipers Kristiansand	Blue Water Dokken, Esbjerg; Attendance: 450; Referees: Doychinov, Goretsov (BUL)
18 October 2020; 14:00	Tranborg 8	(12–12)	Knedlíková, Sulland 4	Blue Water Dokken, Esbjerg; Attendance: 450; Referees: Doychinov, Goretsov (BUL)
18 October 2020; 14:00	1× (yellow card) 3× (suspension)	Report	1× (yellow card) 3× (suspension)	Blue Water Dokken, Esbjerg; Attendance: 450; Referees: Doychinov, Goretsov (BUL)

18 October 2020; 16:00	CSM Bucureşti (Romania)	25–19	(Hungary) FTC-Rail Cargo Hungaria	Polyvalent Hall, Bucharest; Attendance: 0 Referees: Sá, Sá (POR)
18 October 2020; 16:00	Dembélé Pavlović 9	(12–10)	Malestein 5	Polyvalent Hall, Bucharest; Attendance: 0 Referees: Sá, Sá (POR)
18 October 2020; 16:00	1× (yellow card) 3× (suspension)	Report	2× (yellow card) 2× (suspension)	Polyvalent Hall, Bucharest; Attendance: 0 Referees: Sá, Sá (POR)

24 October 2020; 16:00	FTC-Rail Cargo Hungaria (Hungary)	32–25	(Slovenia) RK Krim Mercator	Érd Aréna, Érd; Attendance: 1,000; Referees: Vranes, Wenninger (AUT)
24 October 2020; 16:00	Malestein 10	(14–14)	Vieira 5	Érd Aréna, Érd; Attendance: 1,000; Referees: Vranes, Wenninger (AUT)
24 October 2020; 16:00	1× (yellow card) 5× (suspension)	Report	2× (yellow card) 3× (suspension)	Érd Aréna, Érd; Attendance: 1,000; Referees: Vranes, Wenninger (AUT)

24 October 2020; 18:00	Metz Handball (France)	31–29	(Denmark) Team Esbjerg	Arènes de Metz, Metz; Attendance: 2,756; Referees: Năstase, Stancu (ROU)
24 October 2020; 18:00	Peredery 6	(18–14)	Tranborg 8	Arènes de Metz, Metz; Attendance: 2,756; Referees: Năstase, Stancu (ROU)
24 October 2020; 18:00	1× (yellow card) 6× (suspension)	Report	3× (yellow card) 5× (suspension)	Arènes de Metz, Metz; Attendance: 2,756; Referees: Năstase, Stancu (ROU)

25 October 2020; 16:00	SG BBM Bietigheim (Germany)	22–32	(Romania) CSM Bucureşti	Arena Ludwigsburg, Ludwigsburg; Attendance: 0 Referees: Martens, Schols (BEL)
25 October 2020; 16:00	Schulze 6	(10–14)	Martín, Omoregie 7	Arena Ludwigsburg, Ludwigsburg; Attendance: 0 Referees: Martens, Schols (BEL)
25 October 2020; 16:00	1× (yellow card) 2× (suspension)	Report	1× (yellow card) 5× (suspension)	Arena Ludwigsburg, Ludwigsburg; Attendance: 0 Referees: Martens, Schols (BEL)

7 November 2020; 16:00	FTC-Rail Cargo Hungaria (Hungary)	24–35	(Germany) SG BBM Bietigheim	Érd Aréna, Érd; Attendance: 700; Referees: Bonaventura, Bonaventura (FRA)
7 November 2020; 16:00	Klujber, Kovacsics 7	(11–14)	Lauenroth, Maidhof 7	Érd Aréna, Érd; Attendance: 700; Referees: Bonaventura, Bonaventura (FRA)
7 November 2020; 16:00	1× (yellow card) 2× (suspension)	Report	1× (yellow card) 3× (suspension)	Érd Aréna, Érd; Attendance: 700; Referees: Bonaventura, Bonaventura (FRA)

7 November 2020; 16:00	Rostov-Don (Russia)	28–24	(Denmark) Team Esbjerg	Rostov-on-Don Palace of Sports, Rostov-on-Don; Attendance: 700; Referees: Praštalo, Balvan (BIH)
7 November 2020; 16:00	Managarova 7	(15–13)	Røsberg Jacobsen 8	Rostov-on-Don Palace of Sports, Rostov-on-Don; Attendance: 700; Referees: Praštalo, Balvan (BIH)
7 November 2020; 16:00	2× (suspension)	Report	2× (yellow card) 1× (suspension)	Rostov-on-Don Palace of Sports, Rostov-on-Don; Attendance: 700; Referees: Praštalo, Balvan (BIH)

7 November 2020; 18:00	RK Krim Mercator (Slovenia)	23–25	(Romania) CSM Bucureşti	Arena Stožice, Ljubljana; Attendance: 0 Referees: Lončar, Lončar (CRO)
7 November 2020; 18:00	Vieira 8	(11–12)	Cabral, Lazović 5	Arena Stožice, Ljubljana; Attendance: 0 Referees: Lončar, Lončar (CRO)
7 November 2020; 18:00	1× (yellow card) 2× (suspension)	Report	2× (yellow card) 4× (suspension)	Arena Stožice, Ljubljana; Attendance: 0 Referees: Lončar, Lončar (CRO)

14 November 2020; 16:00	CSM Bucureşti (Romania)	22–22	(Slovenia) RK Krim Mercator	Polyvalent Hall, Bucharest; Attendance: 0 Referees: Mitrović, Kažanegra (MNE)
14 November 2020; 16:00	Lazović 8	(12–11)	Pletikosić, Sercien-Ugolin 6	Polyvalent Hall, Bucharest; Attendance: 0 Referees: Mitrović, Kažanegra (MNE)
14 November 2020; 16:00	3× (suspension)	Report	1× (yellow card) 2× (suspension)	Polyvalent Hall, Bucharest; Attendance: 0 Referees: Mitrović, Kažanegra (MNE)

15 November 2020; 14:00	SG BBM Bietigheim (Germany)	25–29	(Hungary) FTC-Rail Cargo Hungaria	Arena Ludwigsburg, Ludwigsburg; Attendance: 0 Referees: Năstase, Stancu (ROU)
15 November 2020; 14:00	Maidhof, Smits 6	(6–15)	Klujber 8	Arena Ludwigsburg, Ludwigsburg; Attendance: 0 Referees: Năstase, Stancu (ROU)
15 November 2020; 14:00	2× (yellow card) 3× (suspension)	Report	6× (suspension)	Arena Ludwigsburg, Ludwigsburg; Attendance: 0 Referees: Năstase, Stancu (ROU)

15 November 2020; 14:00	Team Esbjerg (Denmark)	24–25	(Russia) Rostov-Don	Blue Water Dokken, Esbjerg; Attendance: 450; Referees: Papamattheou, Christidi (GRE)
15 November 2020; 14:00	Breistøl 6	(12–13)	Managarova 6	Blue Water Dokken, Esbjerg; Attendance: 450; Referees: Papamattheou, Christidi (GRE)
15 November 2020; 14:00	2× (yellow card) 4× (suspension)	Report	3× (yellow card) 2× (suspension)	Blue Water Dokken, Esbjerg; Attendance: 450; Referees: Papamattheou, Christidi (GRE)

19 November 2020 (Note: The match, originally scheduled for 27 September 2020, was postponed after several positive COVID-19 tests by Rostov-Don players.); 17:00	CSM Bucureşti (Romania)	22–27	(Russia) Rostov-Don	Polyvalent Hall, Bucharest; Attendance: 0 Referees: Bethmann, Tzaferopoulos (GRE)
19 November 2020; 17:00	Neagu 11	(10–16)	Vyakhireva 5	Polyvalent Hall, Bucharest; Attendance: 0 Referees: Bethmann, Tzaferopoulos (GRE)
19 November 2020; 17:00	2× (yellow card) 4× (suspension) 1× (red card)	Report	2× (yellow card) 3× (suspension)	Polyvalent Hall, Bucharest; Attendance: 0 Referees: Bethmann, Tzaferopoulos (GRE)

21 November 2020; 16:00	RK Krim Mercator (Slovenia)	26–32	(Hungary) FTC-Rail Cargo Hungaria	Arena Stožice, Ljubljana; Attendance: 0 Referees: Mandák, Rudinský (SVK)
21 November 2020; 16:00	Sercien-Ugolin 6	(13–13)	Háfra, Malestein 8	Arena Stožice, Ljubljana; Attendance: 0 Referees: Mandák, Rudinský (SVK)
21 November 2020; 16:00	2× (yellow card) 1× (suspension)	Report	2× (yellow card) 3× (suspension)	Arena Stožice, Ljubljana; Attendance: 0 Referees: Mandák, Rudinský (SVK)

22 November 2020; 14:00	Team Esbjerg (Denmark)	25–28	(France) Metz Handball	Blue Water Dokken, Esbjerg; Attendance: 450; Referees: Florescu, Stoia (ROU)
22 November 2020; 14:00	Pena, Tranborg 5	(16–12)	Burgaard, Nocandy 5	Blue Water Dokken, Esbjerg; Attendance: 450; Referees: Florescu, Stoia (ROU)
22 November 2020; 14:00	3× (yellow card) 3× (suspension)	Report	1× (yellow card) 2× (suspension)	Blue Water Dokken, Esbjerg; Attendance: 450; Referees: Florescu, Stoia (ROU)

9 January 2021; 16:00	FTC-Rail Cargo Hungaria (Hungary)	31–27	(Romania) CSM Bucureşti	Elek Gyula Aréna, Budapest; Attendance: 0 Referees: Rozhkov, Novikov (UKR)
9 January 2021; 16:00	three players 5	(14–16)	Neagu 9	Elek Gyula Aréna, Budapest; Attendance: 0 Referees: Rozhkov, Novikov (UKR)
9 January 2021; 16:00	3× (suspension)	Report	1× (suspension)	Elek Gyula Aréna, Budapest; Attendance: 0 Referees: Rozhkov, Novikov (UKR)

9 January 2021; 18:00	Vipers Kristiansand (Norway)	28–28	(Denmark) Team Esbjerg	Aquarama Kristiansand, Kristiansand; Attendance: 200; Referees: Lidacka, Lesiak (POL)
9 January 2021; 18:00	Mørk 10	(16–14)	Pena, Røsberg Jacobsen 7	Aquarama Kristiansand, Kristiansand; Attendance: 200; Referees: Lidacka, Lesiak (POL)
9 January 2021; 18:00	1× (yellow card) 4× (suspension)	Report	1× (yellow card) 1× (suspension)	Aquarama Kristiansand, Kristiansand; Attendance: 200; Referees: Lidacka, Lesiak (POL)

10 January 2021; 14:00	SG BBM Bietigheim (Germany)	22–22	(Slovenia) RK Krim Mercator	Arena Ludwigsburg, Ludwigsburg; Attendance: 0 Referees: Alpaidze, Berezkina (RUS)
10 January 2021; 14:00	Smits 6	(14–10)	Gomilar Zickero 5	Arena Ludwigsburg, Ludwigsburg; Attendance: 0 Referees: Alpaidze, Berezkina (RUS)
10 January 2021; 14:00	1× (yellow card) 5× (suspension)	Report	1× (yellow card) 2× (suspension)	Arena Ludwigsburg, Ludwigsburg; Attendance: 0 Referees: Alpaidze, Berezkina (RUS)

10 January 2021; 16:00	Metz Handball (France)	27–26	(Russia) Rostov-Don	Arènes de Metz, Metz; Attendance: 0 Referees: López, Mata (ESP)
10 January 2021; 16:00	O. Kanor 6	(14–13)	Vyakhireva 5	Arènes de Metz, Metz; Attendance: 0 Referees: López, Mata (ESP)
10 January 2021; 16:00	3× (suspension)	Report	3× (suspension)	Arènes de Metz, Metz; Attendance: 0 Referees: López, Mata (ESP)

16 January 2021; 12:00	Rostov-Don (Russia)	27–21	(Germany) SG BBM Bietigheim	Rostov-on-Don Palace of Sports, Rostov-on-Don; Attendance: 750; Referees: Şimşek, Hatipoğlu (TUR)
16 January 2021; 12:00	Frolova, Kuznetsova 5	(15–9)	Berger, Østergaard 4	Rostov-on-Don Palace of Sports, Rostov-on-Don; Attendance: 750; Referees: Şimşek, Hatipoğlu (TUR)
16 January 2021; 12:00	2× (yellow card) 1× (suspension)	Report	2× (yellow card) 2× (suspension)	Rostov-on-Don Palace of Sports, Rostov-on-Don; Attendance: 750; Referees: Şimşek, Hatipoğlu (TUR)

16 January 2021; 16:00	FTC-Rail Cargo Hungaria (Hungary)	24–28	(Denmark) Team Esbjerg	Elek Gyula Aréna, Budapest; Attendance: 20; Referees: Bethmann, Tzaferopoulos (GRE)
16 January 2021; 16:00	Bölk 9	(12–13)	Solberg-Isaksen 8	Elek Gyula Aréna, Budapest; Attendance: 20; Referees: Bethmann, Tzaferopoulos (GRE)
16 January 2021; 16:00	4× (yellow card) 4× (suspension)	Report	2× (yellow card) 2× (suspension)	Elek Gyula Aréna, Budapest; Attendance: 20; Referees: Bethmann, Tzaferopoulos (GRE)

16 January 2021; 16:00	CSM Bucureşti (Romania)	22–29	(Norway) Vipers Kristiansand	Polyvalent Hall, Bucharest; Attendance: 0 Referees: Mošorinski, Pandžić (SRB)
16 January 2021; 16:00	Neagu 10	(9–14)	Knedlíková, Mørk 5	Polyvalent Hall, Bucharest; Attendance: 0 Referees: Mošorinski, Pandžić (SRB)
16 January 2021; 16:00	2× (yellow card) 4× (suspension)	Report	2× (yellow card) 1× (suspension)	Polyvalent Hall, Bucharest; Attendance: 0 Referees: Mošorinski, Pandžić (SRB)

16 January 2021; 18:00	RK Krim Mercator (Slovenia)	22–26	(France) Metz Handball	Arena Stožice, Ljubljana; Attendance: 0 Referees: Doychinov, Goretsov (BUL)
16 January 2021; 18:00	Sercien-Ugolin 5	(10–14)	Sajka 5	Arena Stožice, Ljubljana; Attendance: 0 Referees: Doychinov, Goretsov (BUL)
16 January 2021; 18:00	4× (suspension)	Report	1× (yellow card) 9× (suspension) 1× (red card)	Arena Stožice, Ljubljana; Attendance: 0 Referees: Doychinov, Goretsov (BUL)

20 January 2021 (Note: The match, originally scheduled for 26 September 2020, was postponed after several positive COVID-19 tests by FTC-Rail Cargo Hungaria players.); 18:45	FTC-Rail Cargo Hungaria (Hungary)	32–30	(France) Metz Handball	Elek Gyula Aréna, Budapest; Attendance: 0 Referees: Bolic, Hurich (AUT)
20 January 2021; 18:45	Szucsánszki 7	(18–15)	Nocandy 8	Elek Gyula Aréna, Budapest; Attendance: 0 Referees: Bolic, Hurich (AUT)
20 January 2021; 18:45	3× (yellow card) 7× (suspension)	Report	1× (yellow card) 6× (suspension)	Elek Gyula Aréna, Budapest; Attendance: 0 Referees: Bolic, Hurich (AUT)

24 January 2021; 16:00	Metz Handball (France)	30–29	(Hungary) FTC-Rail Cargo Hungaria	Arènes de Metz, Metz; Attendance: 0 Referees: Antić, Jakovljević (SRB)
24 January 2021; 16:00	three players 5	(14–17)	Malestein 6	Arènes de Metz, Metz; Attendance: 0 Referees: Antić, Jakovljević (SRB)
24 January 2021; 16:00	1× (yellow card) 5× (suspension)	Report	3× (yellow card) 6× (suspension)	Arènes de Metz, Metz; Attendance: 0 Referees: Antić, Jakovljević (SRB)

24 January 2021; 16:00	Team Esbjerg (Denmark)	33–23	(Slovenia) RK Krim Mercator	Blue Water Dokken, Esbjerg; Attendance: 0 Referees: Năstase, Stancu (ROU)
24 January 2021; 16:00	Tranborg 10	(16–11)	Sercien-Ugolin 6	Blue Water Dokken, Esbjerg; Attendance: 0 Referees: Năstase, Stancu (ROU)
24 January 2021; 16:00	1× (yellow card) 5× (suspension)	Report	1× (yellow card) 1× (red card)	Blue Water Dokken, Esbjerg; Attendance: 0 Referees: Năstase, Stancu (ROU)

3 February 2021 (Note: The match, originally scheduled for 15 November 2020, was postponed.); 18:45	Metz Handball (France)	28–29	(Norway) Vipers Kristiansand	Arènes de Metz, Metz; Attendance: 0 Referees: Sá, Sá (POR)
3 February 2021; 18:45	N'Gouan, O. Kanor 6	(11–13)	Mørk 8	Arènes de Metz, Metz; Attendance: 0 Referees: Sá, Sá (POR)
3 February 2021; 18:45	1× (yellow card) 3× (suspension)	Report	1× (yellow card) 3× (suspension)	Arènes de Metz, Metz; Attendance: 0 Referees: Sá, Sá (POR)

6 February 2021; 16:00	FTC-Rail Cargo Hungaria (Hungary)	30–28	(Norway) Vipers Kristiansand	Elek Gyula Aréna, Budapest (Note: The home match is being played on away ground due to the postponed matches.); Attendance: 0 Referees: Budzák, Záhradník (SVK)
6 February 2021; 16:00	Klujber 7	(14–11)	Aune 7	Elek Gyula Aréna, Budapest; Attendance: 0 Referees: Budzák, Záhradník (SVK)
6 February 2021; 16:00	1× (yellow card) 7× (suspension)	Report	3× (suspension)	Elek Gyula Aréna, Budapest; Attendance: 0 Referees: Budzák, Záhradník (SVK)

6 February 2021; 16:00	CSM Bucureşti (Romania)	28–26	(Denmark) Team Esbjerg	Polyvalent Hall, Bucharest; Attendance: 0 Referees: Ilieva, Karbeska (MKD)
6 February 2021; 16:00	Neagu 7	(15–10)	Røsberg Jacobsen 6	Polyvalent Hall, Bucharest; Attendance: 0 Referees: Ilieva, Karbeska (MKD)
6 February 2021; 16:00	3× (yellow card) 3× (suspension)	Report	3× (yellow card) 1× (suspension)	Polyvalent Hall, Bucharest; Attendance: 0 Referees: Ilieva, Karbeska (MKD)

6 February 2021; 16:00	RK Krim Mercator (Slovenia)	28–27	(Russia) Rostov-Don	Kodeljevo Hall, Ljubljana; Attendance: 0 Referees: Mitrović, Kažanegra (MNE)
6 February 2021; 16:00	Pletikosić 9	(17–15)	Kuznetsova 8	Kodeljevo Hall, Ljubljana; Attendance: 0 Referees: Mitrović, Kažanegra (MNE)
6 February 2021; 16:00	2× (yellow card) 3× (suspension)	Report	3× (suspension)	Kodeljevo Hall, Ljubljana; Attendance: 0 Referees: Mitrović, Kažanegra (MNE)

7 February 2021; 16:00	SG BBM Bietigheim (Germany)	25–33	(France) Metz Handball	Arena Ludwigsburg, Ludwigsburg; Attendance: 0 Referees: Panayides, Andreou (CYP)
7 February 2021; 16:00	Naidzinavicius 10	(12–16)	Stanko 8	Arena Ludwigsburg, Ludwigsburg; Attendance: 0 Referees: Panayides, Andreou (CYP)
7 February 2021; 16:00	3× (yellow card) 3× (suspension)	Report	2× (yellow card) 2× (suspension)	Arena Ludwigsburg, Ludwigsburg; Attendance: 0 Referees: Panayides, Andreou (CYP)

8 February 2021 (Note: The match, originally scheduled for 19 September 2020, was postponed after two positive COVID-19 tests by FTC-Rail Cargo Hungaria players.); 17:30	Vipers Kristiansand (Norway)	26–31	(Hungary) FTC-Rail Cargo Hungaria	Elek Gyula Aréna, Budapest (Note: The home match is being played on away ground due to the postponed matches.); Attendance: 0 Referees: Pandžić, Mošorinski (SRB)
8 February 2021; 17:30	Reistad 6	(11–15)	Kovacsics 8	Elek Gyula Aréna, Budapest; Attendance: 0 Referees: Pandžić, Mošorinski (SRB)
8 February 2021; 17:30	3× (yellow card) 5× (suspension)	Report	2× (yellow card) 2× (suspension)	Elek Gyula Aréna, Budapest; Attendance: 0 Referees: Pandžić, Mošorinski (SRB)

10 February 2021 (Note: The match, originally scheduled for 21 November 2020, was rescheduled for 13 January was postponed once again due to several players from Rostov-Don testing positive for COVID-19.); 18:45	Vipers Kristiansand (Norway)	23–24	(Russia) Rostov-Don	Érd Aréna, Érd (Note: The match is being played on neutral ground due to the postponed matches.); Attendance: 0 Referees: Andorka, Hucker (HUN)
10 February 2021; 18:45	three players 4	(16–15)	Vyakhireva 5	Érd Aréna, Érd; Attendance: 0 Referees: Andorka, Hucker (HUN)
10 February 2021; 18:45	1× (yellow card) 3× (suspension)	Report	3× (suspension)	Érd Aréna, Érd; Attendance: 0 Referees: Andorka, Hucker (HUN)

13 February 2021; 16:00	Metz Handball (France)	25–22	(Romania) CSM Bucureşti	Arènes de Metz, Metz; Attendance: 0 Referees: Vranes, Wenninger (AUT)
13 February 2021; 16:00	Sajka 6	(16–12)	Neagu 8	Arènes de Metz, Metz; Attendance: 0 Referees: Vranes, Wenninger (AUT)
13 February 2021; 16:00	4× (suspension)	Report	6× (suspension)	Arènes de Metz, Metz; Attendance: 0 Referees: Vranes, Wenninger (AUT)

13 February 2021; 16:00	Rostov-Don (Russia)	26–24	(Hungary) FTC-Rail Cargo Hungaria	Rostov-on-Don Palace of Sports, Rostov-on-Don; Attendance: 1,250; Referees: Ilieva, Karbeska (MKD)
13 February 2021; 16:00	Managarova 7	(12–12)	Malestein 8	Rostov-on-Don Palace of Sports, Rostov-on-Don; Attendance: 1,250; Referees: Ilieva, Karbeska (MKD)
13 February 2021; 16:00	2× (yellow card)	Report	2× (yellow card) 4× (suspension)	Rostov-on-Don Palace of Sports, Rostov-on-Don; Attendance: 1,250; Referees: Ilieva, Karbeska (MKD)

13 February 2021; 18:00	Vipers Kristiansand (Norway)	37–30	(Slovenia) RK Krim Mercator	Arena Stožice, Ljubljana (Note: The home match is being played on away ground due to the postponed matches.); Attendance: 0 Referees: Praštalo, Balvan (BIH)
13 February 2021; 18:00	Valle Dahl 11	(16–15)	Pletikosić 11	Arena Stožice, Ljubljana; Attendance: 0 Referees: Praštalo, Balvan (BIH)
13 February 2021; 18:00	2× (yellow card) 2× (suspension)	Report	1× (yellow card) 2× (suspension)	Arena Stožice, Ljubljana; Attendance: 0 Referees: Praštalo, Balvan (BIH)

14 February 2021; 14:00	Team Esbjerg (Denmark)	37–29	(Germany) SG BBM Bietigheim	Blue Water Dokken, Esbjerg; Attendance: 0 Referees: Smailagic, Smailagic (SWE)
14 February 2021; 14:00	Breistøl 7	(18–14)	Berger, Naidzinavicius 6	Blue Water Dokken, Esbjerg; Attendance: 0 Referees: Smailagic, Smailagic (SWE)
14 February 2021; 14:00	2× (yellow card) 4× (suspension)	Report	1× (yellow card) 2× (suspension)	Blue Water Dokken, Esbjerg; Attendance: 0 Referees: Smailagic, Smailagic (SWE)

Cancelled (Note: The match, originally scheduled for 26 September 2020, was postponed after several positive COVID-19 tests by Krim Mercator players.)	RK Krim Mercator (Slovenia)	0–10 (Note: The matches could not be played and were assessed by the EHF.)	(Denmark) Team Esbjerg

Cancelled (Note: The match, originally scheduled for 24 October 2020, was postponed.)	Rostov-Don (Russia)	10–0	(Norway) Vipers Kristiansand

Cancelled (Note: The match, originally scheduled for 7 November 2020, was postponed.)	Vipers Kristiansand (Norway)	0–10	(France) Metz Handball

Cancelled (Note: The match, originally scheduled for 22 November 2020, was postponed.)	CSM Bucureşti (Romania)	10–0	(Germany) SG BBM Bietigheim

Cancelled (Note: The match, originally scheduled for 23 January 2021, was rescheduled for 13 January was postponed once again due to several players from Rostov-Don testing positive for COVID-19.)	Vipers Kristiansand (Norway)	10–0	(Germany) SG BBM Bietigheim

Cancelled (Note: The match, originally scheduled for 24 January 2021, was postponed.)	Rostov-Don (Russia)	0–10	(Romania) CSM Bucureşti

=== Group B ===
Pos	Team	Pld	W	D	L	GF	GA	GD	Pts
1	(Hungary) Győri Audi ETO KC	14	10	4	0	457	353	+104	24
2	(Russia) CSKA Moscow	14	11	1	2	404	350	+54	23
3	(France) Brest Bretagne Handball	14	6	5	3	384	349	+35	17
4	(Denmark) Odense Håndbold	14	6	1	7	384	370	+14	13
5	(Montenegro) Budućnost	14	5	2	7	363	377	−14	12
6	(Romania) SCM Râmnicu Vâlcea	14	5	0	9	263	319	−56	10
7	(Germany) Borussia Dortmund	14	4	1	9	347	391	−44	9
8	(Croatia) HC Podravka Vegeta	14	2	0	12	326	419	−93	4

Source: EHF
Rules for classification: Tiebreakers

12 September 2020; 16:00	CSKA Moscow (Russia)	27–27	(Hungary) Győri Audi ETO KC	Dynamo Sports Palace, Moscow; Attendance: 526; Referees: Covalciuc, Covalciuc (MDA)
12 September 2020; 16:00	Mikhaylichenko 7	(14–14)	Kristiansen 7	Dynamo Sports Palace, Moscow; Attendance: 526; Referees: Covalciuc, Covalciuc (MDA)
12 September 2020; 16:00	2× (yellow card) 2× (suspension)	Report	3× (yellow card) 4× (suspension)	Dynamo Sports Palace, Moscow; Attendance: 526; Referees: Covalciuc, Covalciuc (MDA)

12 September 2020; 16:00	Odense Håndbold (Denmark)	32–27	(Germany) Borussia Dortmund	Sydbank Arena, Odense; Attendance: 381; Referees: Panayides, Andreou (CYP)
12 September 2020; 16:00	Groot 8	(13–13)	Gutiérrez Bermejo 8	Sydbank Arena, Odense; Attendance: 381; Referees: Panayides, Andreou (CYP)
12 September 2020; 16:00	2× (yellow card) 2× (suspension)	Report	1× (yellow card) 4× (suspension)	Sydbank Arena, Odense; Attendance: 381; Referees: Panayides, Andreou (CYP)

12 September 2020; 18:00	Brest Bretagne Handball (France)	28–21	(Romania) SCM Râmnicu Vâlcea	Brest Arena, Brest; Attendance: 2,895; Referees: Freitas, Carvalho (POR)
12 September 2020; 18:00	Gros 8	(12–12)	López 4	Brest Arena, Brest; Attendance: 2,895; Referees: Freitas, Carvalho (POR)
12 September 2020; 18:00	4× (suspension)	Report	2× (yellow card) 4× (suspension) 1× (red card)	Brest Arena, Brest; Attendance: 2,895; Referees: Freitas, Carvalho (POR)

13 September 2020; 16:00	HC Podravka Vegeta (Croatia)	29–26	(Montenegro) Budućnost	Gimnazija "Fran Galović", Koprivnica; Attendance: 100; Referees: López, Mata (ESP)
13 September 2020; 16:00	Turk 6	(12–17)	Lekić 9	Gimnazija "Fran Galović", Koprivnica; Attendance: 100; Referees: López, Mata (ESP)
13 September 2020; 16:00	2× (yellow card) 4× (suspension)	Report	3× (yellow card) 6× (suspension)	Gimnazija "Fran Galović", Koprivnica; Attendance: 100; Referees: López, Mata (ESP)

19 September 2020; 16:00	Győri Audi ETO KC (Hungary)	43–28	(Croatia) HC Podravka Vegeta	Audi Aréna, Győr; Attendance: 1,882; Referees: Lidacka, Lesiak (POL)
19 September 2020; 16:00	Oftedal 8	(17–16)	Carlos, Milosavljević 8	Audi Aréna, Győr; Attendance: 1,882; Referees: Lidacka, Lesiak (POL)
19 September 2020; 16:00	2× (yellow card) 5× (suspension)	Report	3× (yellow card) 5× (suspension)	Audi Aréna, Győr; Attendance: 1,882; Referees: Lidacka, Lesiak (POL)

19 September 2020; 16:00	SCM Râmnicu Vâlcea (Romania)	21–30	(Denmark) Odense Håndbold	Traian Sports Hall, Râmnicu Vâlcea; Attendance: 0 Referees: Yovchev, Yonchev (BUL)
19 September 2020; 16:00	Fernández 6	(10–13)	Cohrt 8	Traian Sports Hall, Râmnicu Vâlcea; Attendance: 0 Referees: Yovchev, Yonchev (BUL)
19 September 2020; 16:00	2× (yellow card) 3× (suspension)	Report	2× (yellow card) 5× (suspension)	Traian Sports Hall, Râmnicu Vâlcea; Attendance: 0 Referees: Yovchev, Yonchev (BUL)

19 September 2020; 18:00	Budućnost (Montenegro)	22–25	(Russia) CSKA Moscow	Morača Sports Center, Podgorica; Attendance: 20; Referees: Mitrevski, Todorovski (MKD)
19 September 2020; 18:00	Maslova 6	(13–13)	three players 5	Morača Sports Center, Podgorica; Attendance: 20; Referees: Mitrevski, Todorovski (MKD)
19 September 2020; 18:00	3× (yellow card) 3× (suspension)	Report	2× (yellow card) 2× (suspension)	Morača Sports Center, Podgorica; Attendance: 20; Referees: Mitrevski, Todorovski (MKD)

20 September 2020; 16:00	Borussia Dortmund (Germany)	29–41	(France) Brest Bretagne Handball	Helmut-Körnig-Halle, Dortmund; Attendance: 300; Referees: Bíró, Kiss (HUN)
20 September 2020; 16:00	Amega 5	(13–23)	Gros 7	Helmut-Körnig-Halle, Dortmund; Attendance: 300; Referees: Bíró, Kiss (HUN)
20 September 2020; 16:00	1× (yellow card) 1× (suspension) 1× (red card)	Report	2× (yellow card)	Helmut-Körnig-Halle, Dortmund; Attendance: 300; Referees: Bíró, Kiss (HUN)

26 September 2020; 16:00	CSKA Moscow (Russia)	30–20	(Romania) SCM Râmnicu Vâlcea	Dynamo Sports Palace, Moscow; Attendance: 430; Referees: Kulik, Nabokau (BLR)
26 September 2020; 16:00	Mikhaylichenko 9	(14–11)	López 4	Dynamo Sports Palace, Moscow; Attendance: 430; Referees: Kulik, Nabokau (BLR)
26 September 2020; 16:00	3× (suspension)	Report	5× (suspension)	Dynamo Sports Palace, Moscow; Attendance: 430; Referees: Kulik, Nabokau (BLR)

26 September 2020; 16:00	HC Podravka Vegeta (Croatia)	25–26	(Germany) Borussia Dortmund	Gimnazija "Fran Galović", Koprivnica; Attendance: 100; Referees: Beqiri, Krasniqi (KOS)
26 September 2020; 16:00	Tsàkalou 6	(14–15)	Grijseels 7	Gimnazija "Fran Galović", Koprivnica; Attendance: 100; Referees: Beqiri, Krasniqi (KOS)
26 September 2020; 16:00	3× (yellow card) 5× (suspension)	Report	3× (yellow card) 4× (suspension)	Gimnazija "Fran Galović", Koprivnica; Attendance: 100; Referees: Beqiri, Krasniqi (KOS)

27 September 2020; 16:00	Brest Bretagne Handball (France)	25–25	(Hungary) Győri Audi ETO KC	Brest Arena, Brest; Attendance: 3,500; Referees: Doychinov, Goretsov (BUL)
27 September 2020; 16:00	Gros 9	(12–12)	three players 4	Brest Arena, Brest; Attendance: 3,500; Referees: Doychinov, Goretsov (BUL)
27 September 2020; 16:00	1× (yellow card) 2× (suspension)	Report	3× (yellow card) 3× (suspension)	Brest Arena, Brest; Attendance: 3,500; Referees: Doychinov, Goretsov (BUL)

27 September 2020; 16:00	Odense Håndbold (Denmark)	30–21	(Montenegro) Budućnost	Sydbank Arena, Odense; Attendance: 387; Referees: Braseth, Sundet (NOR)
27 September 2020; 16:00	Quintino 8	(12–8)	Lekić, Mehmedović 6	Sydbank Arena, Odense; Attendance: 387; Referees: Braseth, Sundet (NOR)
27 September 2020; 16:00	2× (yellow card) 4× (suspension)	Report	2× (yellow card) 6× (suspension) 1× (red card)	Sydbank Arena, Odense; Attendance: 387; Referees: Braseth, Sundet (NOR)

10 October 2020; 18:00	Budućnost (Montenegro)	22–22	(France) Brest Bretagne Handball	Bemax Arena, Podgorica; Attendance: 10; Referees: Alpaidze, Berezkina (RUS)
10 October 2020; 18:00	Pineau, Radičević 6	(12–12)	Lassource 5	Bemax Arena, Podgorica; Attendance: 10; Referees: Alpaidze, Berezkina (RUS)
10 October 2020; 18:00	2× (yellow card) 3× (suspension)	Report	1× (yellow card) 5× (suspension)	Bemax Arena, Podgorica; Attendance: 10; Referees: Alpaidze, Berezkina (RUS)

10 October 2020; 18:00	Győri Audi ETO KC (Hungary)	32–25	(Denmark) Odense Håndbold	Audi Aréna, Győr; Attendance: 2,631; Referees: Năstase, Stancu (ROU)
10 October 2020; 18:00	Kristiansen 7	(16–11)	Abbingh 7	Audi Aréna, Győr; Attendance: 2,631; Referees: Năstase, Stancu (ROU)
10 October 2020; 18:00	1× (yellow card) 2× (suspension)	Report	2× (yellow card) 3× (suspension)	Audi Aréna, Győr; Attendance: 2,631; Referees: Năstase, Stancu (ROU)

11 October 2020; 16:00	Borussia Dortmund (Germany)	28–29	(Russia) CSKA Moscow	Helmut-Körnig-Halle, Dortmund; Attendance: 300; Referees: Smailagic, Smailagic (SWE)
11 October 2020; 16:00	Grijseels 10	(15–11)	Ilyina 8	Helmut-Körnig-Halle, Dortmund; Attendance: 300; Referees: Smailagic, Smailagic (SWE)
11 October 2020; 16:00	2× (yellow card) 3× (suspension)	Report	2× (yellow card) 1× (suspension)	Helmut-Körnig-Halle, Dortmund; Attendance: 300; Referees: Smailagic, Smailagic (SWE)

17 October 2020; 18:00	Győri Audi ETO KC (Hungary)	38–31	(Romania) SCM Râmnicu Vâlcea	Audi Aréna, Győr; Attendance: 2,257; Referees: Rozhkov, Novikov (UKR)
17 October 2020; 18:00	Nze Minko 10	(15–17)	González 8	Audi Aréna, Győr; Attendance: 2,257; Referees: Rozhkov, Novikov (UKR)
17 October 2020; 18:00	2× (yellow card) 2× (suspension)	Report	1× (yellow card) 4× (suspension)	Audi Aréna, Győr; Attendance: 2,257; Referees: Rozhkov, Novikov (UKR)

18 October 2020; 14:00	Borussia Dortmund (Germany)	26–28	(Montenegro) Budućnost	Helmut-Körnig-Halle, Dortmund; Attendance: 0 Referees: Bounouara, Sami (FRA)
18 October 2020; 14:00	Grijseels, Vollebregt 6	(15–13)	Mehmedović, Pineau 7	Helmut-Körnig-Halle, Dortmund; Attendance: 0 Referees: Bounouara, Sami (FRA)
18 October 2020; 14:00	2× (yellow card) 3× (suspension)	Report	2× (yellow card) 1× (suspension)	Helmut-Körnig-Halle, Dortmund; Attendance: 0 Referees: Bounouara, Sami (FRA)

18 October 2020; 16:00	Brest Bretagne Handball (France)	28–30	(Russia) CSKA Moscow	Brest Arena, Brest; Attendance: 2,874; Referees: Bethmann, Tzaferopoulos (GRE)
18 October 2020; 16:00	Gros 6	(13–17)	Mikhaylichenko 7	Brest Arena, Brest; Attendance: 2,874; Referees: Bethmann, Tzaferopoulos (GRE)
18 October 2020; 16:00	3× (yellow card) 1× (suspension)	Report	6× (suspension)	Brest Arena, Brest; Attendance: 2,874; Referees: Bethmann, Tzaferopoulos (GRE)

18 October 2020; 16:00	HC Podravka Vegeta (Croatia)	17–33	(Denmark) Odense Håndbold	Gimnazija "Fran Galović", Koprivnica; Attendance: 100; Referees: Praštalo, Balvan (BIH)
18 October 2020; 16:00	Carlos, Milosavljević 5	(12–16)	Elver 5	Gimnazija "Fran Galović", Koprivnica; Attendance: 100; Referees: Praštalo, Balvan (BIH)
18 October 2020; 16:00	2× (yellow card) 6× (suspension)	Report	1× (yellow card) 4× (suspension)	Gimnazija "Fran Galović", Koprivnica; Attendance: 100; Referees: Praštalo, Balvan (BIH)

25 October 2020; 16:00	Odense Håndbold (Denmark)	24–31	(France) Brest Bretagne Handball	Sydbank Arena, Odense; Attendance: 392; Referees: Papamattheou, Christidi (GRE)
25 October 2020; 16:00	three players 4	(12–16)	Gros 14	Sydbank Arena, Odense; Attendance: 392; Referees: Papamattheou, Christidi (GRE)
25 October 2020; 16:00	4× (yellow card) 3× (suspension)	Report	1× (yellow card) 6× (suspension)	Sydbank Arena, Odense; Attendance: 392; Referees: Papamattheou, Christidi (GRE)

6 November 2020 (Note: The match, originally scheduled for 8 November 2020, was moved to 6 November and Hungary.); 18:30	Borussia Dortmund (Germany)	24–34	(Hungary) Győri Audi ETO KC	Audi Aréna, Győr; Attendance: 987; Referees: Vranes, Wenninger (AUT)
6 November 2020; 18:30	Gutiérrez Bermejo 6	(11–19)	Amorim 7	Audi Aréna, Győr; Attendance: 987; Referees: Vranes, Wenninger (AUT)
6 November 2020; 18:30	1× (yellow card) 4× (suspension)	Report	1× (yellow card) 1× (suspension)	Audi Aréna, Győr; Attendance: 987; Referees: Vranes, Wenninger (AUT)

8 November 2020 (Note: The match, originally scheduled for 15 November 2020, was moved to 8 November.); 14:00	Győri Audi ETO KC (Hungary)	38–25	(Germany) Borussia Dortmund	Audi Aréna, Győr; Attendance: 969; Referees: Mosorinski, Pandzić (SRB)
8 November 2020; 14:00	Amorim, Oftedal 6	(19–11)	Abdulla, Bleckmann 5	Audi Aréna, Győr; Attendance: 969; Referees: Mosorinski, Pandzić (SRB)
8 November 2020; 14:00	2× (yellow card) 1× (suspension)	Report	2× (yellow card) 2× (suspension)	Audi Aréna, Győr; Attendance: 969; Referees: Mosorinski, Pandzić (SRB)

8 November 2020; 14:00	CSKA Moscow (Russia)	27–23	(Denmark) Odense Håndbold	Dynamo Sports Palace, Moscow; Attendance: 420; Referees: Antić, Jakovljević (SRB)
8 November 2020; 14:00	Vedekhina 6	(14–11)	Groot 6	Dynamo Sports Palace, Moscow; Attendance: 420; Referees: Antić, Jakovljević (SRB)
8 November 2020; 14:00	3× (yellow card) 2× (suspension)	Report	1× (yellow card) 3× (suspension)	Dynamo Sports Palace, Moscow; Attendance: 420; Referees: Antić, Jakovljević (SRB)

14 November 2020; 16:00	HC Podravka Vegeta (Croatia)	29–33	(France) Brest Bretagne Handball	Gimnazija "Fran Galović", Koprivnica; Attendance: 0 Referees: Sá, Sá (POR)
14 November 2020; 16:00	Milosavljević 12	(14–16)	Gros, Pop-Lazić 8	Gimnazija "Fran Galović", Koprivnica; Attendance: 0 Referees: Sá, Sá (POR)
14 November 2020; 16:00	2× (yellow card) 5× (suspension) 1× (red card)	Report	2× (yellow card) 2× (suspension)	Gimnazija "Fran Galović", Koprivnica; Attendance: 0 Referees: Sá, Sá (POR)

14 November 2020; 18:00	Budućnost (Montenegro)	29–28	(Romania) SCM Râmnicu Vâlcea	Bemax Arena, Podgorica; Attendance: 0 Referees: Ilieva, Karbeska (MKD)
14 November 2020; 18:00	Lekić 7	(15–14)	Elghaoui 8	Bemax Arena, Podgorica; Attendance: 0 Referees: Ilieva, Karbeska (MKD)
14 November 2020; 18:00	2× (yellow card) 6× (suspension)	Report	3× (yellow card) 1× (suspension)	Bemax Arena, Podgorica; Attendance: 0 Referees: Ilieva, Karbeska (MKD)

15 November 2020; 16:00	Odense Håndbold (Denmark)	26–25	(Russia) CSKA Moscow	Sydbank Arena, Odense; Attendance: 396; Referees: Florescu, Stoia (ROU)
15 November 2020; 16:00	Abbingh 9	(12–11)	Ilyina 6	Sydbank Arena, Odense; Attendance: 396; Referees: Florescu, Stoia (ROU)
15 November 2020; 16:00	3× (yellow card)	Report	4× (yellow card) 3× (suspension)	Sydbank Arena, Odense; Attendance: 396; Referees: Florescu, Stoia (ROU)

16 November 2020 (Note: The match, originally scheduled for 8 November 2020, was postponed.); 18:00	Brest Bretagne Handball (France)	32–25	(Croatia) HC Podravka Vegeta	Gimnazija "Fran Galović", Koprivnica; Attendance: 0 Referees: Mitrevski, Todorovski (MKD)
16 November 2020; 18:00	Niakaté, Toublanc 6	(15–12)	Milosavljević 11	Gimnazija "Fran Galović", Koprivnica; Attendance: 0 Referees: Mitrevski, Todorovski (MKD)
16 November 2020; 18:00	3× (yellow card) 6× (suspension)	Report	3× (yellow card) 5× (suspension)	Gimnazija "Fran Galović", Koprivnica; Attendance: 0 Referees: Mitrevski, Todorovski (MKD)

21 November 2020; 18:00	Győri Audi ETO KC (Hungary)	34–29	(Montenegro) Budućnost	Audi Aréna, Győr; Attendance: 0 Referees: Antić, Jakovljević (SRB)
21 November 2020; 18:00	Oftedal 10	(18–16)	Lekić 11	Audi Aréna, Győr; Attendance: 0 Referees: Antić, Jakovljević (SRB)
21 November 2020; 18:00	2× (yellow card) 1× (suspension)	Report	1× (yellow card) 4× (suspension) 1× (red card)	Audi Aréna, Győr; Attendance: 0 Referees: Antić, Jakovljević (SRB)

22 November 2020; 16:00	Brest Bretagne Handball (France)	32–21	(Denmark) Odense Håndbold	Brest Arena, Brest; Attendance: 0 Referees: Álvarez, Bustamante (ESP)
22 November 2020; 16:00	Gros, Niakaté 6	(15–13)	Elver 5	Brest Arena, Brest; Attendance: 0 Referees: Álvarez, Bustamante (ESP)
22 November 2020; 16:00	1× (yellow card) 2× (suspension)	Report	1× (yellow card) 2× (suspension)	Brest Arena, Brest; Attendance: 0 Referees: Álvarez, Bustamante (ESP)

9 January 2021; 16:00	CSKA Moscow (Russia)	25–24	(France) Brest Bretagne Handball	Dynamo Sports Palace, Moscow; Attendance: 0 Referees: Mitrović, Kazanegra (MNE)
9 January 2021; 16:00	Ilyina 7	(12–12)	Jauković 6	Dynamo Sports Palace, Moscow; Attendance: 0 Referees: Mitrović, Kazanegra (MNE)
9 January 2021; 16:00	1× (yellow card) 3× (suspension)	Report	1× (suspension)	Dynamo Sports Palace, Moscow; Attendance: 0 Referees: Mitrović, Kazanegra (MNE)

9 January 2021; 16:00	Odense Håndbold (Denmark)	35–20	(Croatia) HC Podravka Vegeta	Sydbank Arena, Odense; Attendance: 1 Referees: Smailagic, Smailagic (SWE)
9 January 2021; 16:00	Rej 9	(18–10)	Milosavljević 5	Sydbank Arena, Odense; Attendance: 1 Referees: Smailagic, Smailagic (SWE)
9 January 2021; 16:00	2× (yellow card) 2× (suspension)	Report	1× (yellow card) 4× (suspension)	Sydbank Arena, Odense; Attendance: 1 Referees: Smailagic, Smailagic (SWE)

9 January 2021; 18:00	Budućnost (Montenegro)	31–27	(Germany) Borussia Dortmund	Morača Sports Center, Podgorica; Attendance: 0 Referees: Praštalo, Balvan (BIH)
9 January 2021; 18:00	Radičević 10	(15–15)	Grijseels 6	Morača Sports Center, Podgorica; Attendance: 0 Referees: Praštalo, Balvan (BIH)
9 January 2021; 18:00	2× (yellow card) 4× (suspension)	Report	1× (yellow card) 2× (suspension)	Morača Sports Center, Podgorica; Attendance: 0 Referees: Praštalo, Balvan (BIH)

10 January 2021; 18:00	SCM Râmnicu Vâlcea (Romania)	20–37	(Hungary) Győri Audi ETO KC	Traian Sports Hall, Râmnicu Vâlcea; Attendance: 0 Referees: Antić, Jakovljević (SRB)
10 January 2021; 18:00	Minevskaja 4	(12–19)	Kristiansen 9	Traian Sports Hall, Râmnicu Vâlcea; Attendance: 0 Referees: Antić, Jakovljević (SRB)
10 January 2021; 18:00	2× (yellow card) 2× (suspension)	Report	2× (yellow card) 2× (suspension)	Traian Sports Hall, Râmnicu Vâlcea; Attendance: 0 Referees: Antić, Jakovljević (SRB)

16 January 2021; 16:00	CSKA Moscow (Russia)	35–28	(Germany) Borussia Dortmund	Dynamo Sports Palace, Moscow; Attendance: 0 Referees: Sirbu, Serdiuc (MDA)
16 January 2021; 16:00	Ilyina 9	(19–12)	Stockschläder 5	Dynamo Sports Palace, Moscow; Attendance: 0 Referees: Sirbu, Serdiuc (MDA)
16 January 2021; 16:00	1× (yellow card) 3× (suspension)	Report	1× (yellow card) 2× (suspension)	Dynamo Sports Palace, Moscow; Attendance: 0 Referees: Sirbu, Serdiuc (MDA)

17 January 2021; 16:00	Brest Bretagne Handball (France)	28–28	(Montenegro) Budućnost	Brest Arena, Brest; Attendance: 0 Referees: Papamattheou, Christidi (GRE)
17 January 2021; 16:00	Gros, Coatanea 5	(11–18)	Grbić, Radičević 6	Brest Arena, Brest; Attendance: 0 Referees: Papamattheou, Christidi (GRE)
17 January 2021; 16:00	2× (suspension)	Report	1× (yellow card) 3× (suspension)	Brest Arena, Brest; Attendance: 0 Referees: Papamattheou, Christidi (GRE)

17 January 2021; 16:00	Odense Håndbold (Denmark)	32–32	(Hungary) Győri Audi ETO KC	Odense Sports Park, Odense; Attendance: 0 Referees: Sá, Sá (POR)
17 January 2021; 16:00	Abbingh 11	(18–17)	Amorim 7	Odense Sports Park, Odense; Attendance: 0 Referees: Sá, Sá (POR)
17 January 2021; 16:00	2× (yellow card) 2× (suspension)	Report	1× (yellow card) 2× (suspension)	Odense Sports Park, Odense; Attendance: 0 Referees: Sá, Sá (POR)

17 January 2021; 16:00	HC Podravka Vegeta (Croatia)	25–27	(Romania) SCM Râmnicu Vâlcea	Gimnazija "Fran Galović", Koprivnica; Attendance: 0 Referees: Vranes, Wenninger (AUT)
17 January 2021; 16:00	Milosavljević 9	(13–15)	Minevskaja 7	Gimnazija "Fran Galović", Koprivnica; Attendance: 0 Referees: Vranes, Wenninger (AUT)
17 January 2021; 16:00	1× (yellow card) 6× (suspension)	Report	1× (yellow card) 4× (suspension)	Gimnazija "Fran Galović", Koprivnica; Attendance: 0 Referees: Vranes, Wenninger (AUT)

20 January 2021 (Note: The match, originally scheduled for 8 November 2020, was postponed.); 17:00	SCM Râmnicu Vâlcea (Romania)	25–23	(Montenegro) Budućnost	Traian Sports Hall, Râmnicu Vâlcea; Attendance: 0 Referees: Covalciuc, Covalciuc (MDA)
20 January 2021; 17:00	Minevskaja 6	(14–10)	Pineau, Radičević 6	Traian Sports Hall, Râmnicu Vâlcea; Attendance: 0 Referees: Covalciuc, Covalciuc (MDA)
20 January 2021; 17:00	2× (yellow card) 2× (suspension)	Report	3× (yellow card) 4× (suspension) 1× (red card)	Traian Sports Hall, Râmnicu Vâlcea; Attendance: 0 Referees: Covalciuc, Covalciuc (MDA)

23 January 2021; 18:00	Győri Audi ETO KC (Hungary)	27–27	(France) Brest Bretagne Handball	Audi Aréna, Győr; Attendance: 0 Referees: Vranes, Wenninger (AUT)
23 January 2021; 18:00	Amorim, Kristiansen 7	(15–15)	Gros, Lassource 5	Audi Aréna, Győr; Attendance: 0 Referees: Vranes, Wenninger (AUT)
23 January 2021; 18:00	4× (suspension)	Report	1× (yellow card) 5× (suspension)	Audi Aréna, Győr; Attendance: 0 Referees: Vranes, Wenninger (AUT)

23 January 2021; 18:00	Budućnost (Montenegro)	27–24	(Denmark) Odense Håndbold	Morača Sports Center, Podgorica; Attendance: 0 Referees: Andorka, Hucker (HUN)
23 January 2021; 18:00	Radičević 9	(13–10)	Abbingh 10	Morača Sports Center, Podgorica; Attendance: 0 Referees: Andorka, Hucker (HUN)
23 January 2021; 18:00	4× (yellow card) 5× (suspension)	Report	3× (yellow card) 2× (suspension)	Morača Sports Center, Podgorica; Attendance: 0 Referees: Andorka, Hucker (HUN)

24 January 2021; 14:00	Borussia Dortmund (Germany)	32–31	(Croatia) HC Podravka Vegeta	Helmut Körnig Halle, Dortmund; Attendance: 0 Referees: Alpaidze, Berezkina (RUS)
24 January 2021; 14:00	Van der Heijden, Smits 8	(13–12)	Tsàkalou 7	Helmut Körnig Halle, Dortmund; Attendance: 0 Referees: Alpaidze, Berezkina (RUS)
24 January 2021; 14:00	5× (suspension) 1× (red card)	Report	4× (suspension) 1× (red card)	Helmut Körnig Halle, Dortmund; Attendance: 0 Referees: Alpaidze, Berezkina (RUS)

24 January 2021; 16:00	SCM Râmnicu Vâlcea (Romania)	24–34	(Russia) CSKA Moscow	Traian Sports Hall, Râmnicu Vâlcea; Attendance: 0 Referees: Doychinov, Goretsov (BUL)
24 January 2021; 16:00	Elghaoui 7	(9–17)	Sudakova 7	Traian Sports Hall, Râmnicu Vâlcea; Attendance: 0 Referees: Doychinov, Goretsov (BUL)
24 January 2021; 16:00	2× (yellow card) 1× (suspension)	Report	2× (yellow card) 5× (suspension)	Traian Sports Hall, Râmnicu Vâlcea; Attendance: 0 Referees: Doychinov, Goretsov (BUL)

29 January 2021 (Note: The match, originally scheduled for 24 October 2020, was postponed.); 19:00	Budućnost (Montenegro)	21–26	(Hungary) Győri Audi ETO KC	Morača Sports Center, Podgorica; Attendance: 0 Referees: Hatipoğlu, Şimşek (TUR)
29 January 2021; 19:00	Radičević 6	(8–14)	Nze Minko 6	Morača Sports Center, Podgorica; Attendance: 0 Referees: Hatipoğlu, Şimşek (TUR)
29 January 2021; 19:00	2× (yellow card) 4× (suspension)	Report	2× (yellow card) 3× (suspension)	Morača Sports Center, Podgorica; Attendance: 0 Referees: Hatipoğlu, Şimşek (TUR)

31 January 2021 (Note: The match, originally scheduled for 24 October 2020, was postponed.); 14:00	CSKA Moscow (Russia)	30–26	(Croatia) HC Podravka Vegeta	Dynamo Sports Palace, Moscow; Attendance: 420; Referees: Aghakishi, Aghakishi (AZE)
31 January 2021; 14:00	Skorobogatchenko, Vedekhina 6	(18–16)	Milosavljević 7	Dynamo Sports Palace, Moscow; Attendance: 420; Referees: Aghakishi, Aghakishi (AZE)
31 January 2021; 14:00	2× (yellow card) 3× (suspension)	Report	1× (yellow card) 3× (suspension)	Dynamo Sports Palace, Moscow; Attendance: 420; Referees: Aghakishi, Aghakishi (AZE)

1 February 2021 (Note: The match, originally scheduled for 22 November 2020, was postponed.); 17:00	HC Podravka Vegeta (Croatia)	20–36	(Russia) CSKA Moscow	Dynamo Sports Palace, Moscow; Attendance: 230; Referees: Aghakishi, Aghakishi (AZE)
1 February 2021; 17:00	Tsakalou 7	(10–16)	Dmitrieva 6	Dynamo Sports Palace, Moscow; Attendance: 230; Referees: Aghakishi, Aghakishi (AZE)
1 February 2021; 17:00	1× (yellow card) 3× (suspension)	Report	1× (yellow card) 2× (suspension)	Dynamo Sports Palace, Moscow; Attendance: 230; Referees: Aghakishi, Aghakishi (AZE)

6 February 2021; 16:00	Brest Bretagne Handball (France)	33–33	(Germany) Borussia Dortmund	Brest Arena, Brest; Attendance: 0 Referees: Geraets, Geraets (NED)
6 February 2021; 16:00	Gulldén 8	(17–20)	Smits 11	Brest Arena, Brest; Attendance: 0 Referees: Geraets, Geraets (NED)
6 February 2021; 16:00	2× (suspension)	Report	1× (suspension)	Brest Arena, Brest; Attendance: 0 Referees: Geraets, Geraets (NED)

6 February 2021; 18:00	HC Podravka Vegeta (Croatia)	15–33	(Hungary) Győri Audi ETO KC	Gimnazija "Fran Galović", Koprivnica; Attendance: 0 Referees: Christidi, Papamattheou (GRE)
6 February 2021; 18:00	Tsakalou 7	(8–13)	Kristiansen 6	Gimnazija "Fran Galović", Koprivnica; Attendance: 0 Referees: Christidi, Papamattheou (GRE)
6 February 2021; 18:00	1× (yellow card) 4× (suspension)	Report	1× (yellow card) 2× (suspension)	Gimnazija "Fran Galović", Koprivnica; Attendance: 0 Referees: Christidi, Papamattheou (GRE)

7 February 2021; 14:00	CSKA Moscow (Russia)	27–23	(Montenegro) Budućnost	Dynamo Sports Palace, Moscow; Attendance: 0 Referees: Nabokau, Kulik (BLR)
7 February 2021; 14:00	Vedekhina 5	(12–10)	Mehmedović, Radičević 5	Dynamo Sports Palace, Moscow; Attendance: 0 Referees: Nabokau, Kulik (BLR)
7 February 2021; 14:00	2× (yellow card) 2× (suspension)	Report	3× (yellow card) 4× (suspension)	Dynamo Sports Palace, Moscow; Attendance: 0 Referees: Nabokau, Kulik (BLR)

7 February 2021; 16:00	Odense Håndbold (Denmark)	25–26	(Romania) SCM Râmnicu Vâlcea	Sydbank Arena, Odense; Attendance: 1 Referees: Barysas, Petrušis (LTU)
7 February 2021; 16:00	Groot, Højlund 6	(10–13)	Minevskaja 6	Sydbank Arena, Odense; Attendance: 1 Referees: Barysas, Petrušis (LTU)
7 February 2021; 16:00	2× (yellow card) 6× (suspension)	Report	1× (yellow card) 5× (suspension)	Sydbank Arena, Odense; Attendance: 1 Referees: Barysas, Petrušis (LTU)

13 February 2021; 18:00	Győri Audi ETO KC (Hungary)	31–24	(Russia) CSKA Moscow	Audi Aréna, Győr; Attendance: 0 Referees: Ciulei, Stoia (ROU)
13 February 2021; 18:00	Lukács 7	(14–13)	Ilyina, Vedekhina 4	Audi Aréna, Győr; Attendance: 0 Referees: Ciulei, Stoia (ROU)
13 February 2021; 18:00	1× (yellow card)	Report	3× (yellow card) 4× (suspension)	Audi Aréna, Győr; Attendance: 0 Referees: Ciulei, Stoia (ROU)

13 February 2021; 18:00	Budućnost (Montenegro)	33–26	(Croatia) HC Podravka Vegeta	Morača Sports Center, Podgorica; Attendance: 0 Referees: Doychinov, Goretsov (BUL)
13 February 2021; 18:00	Radičević 8	(13–11)	Tsakalou 8	Morača Sports Center, Podgorica; Attendance: 0 Referees: Doychinov, Goretsov (BUL)
13 February 2021; 18:00	1× (yellow card) 4× (suspension)	Report	3× (suspension)	Morača Sports Center, Podgorica; Attendance: 0 Referees: Doychinov, Goretsov (BUL)

14 February 2021; 16:00	Borussia Dortmund (Germany)	32–24	(Denmark) Odense Håndbold	Helmut Körnig Halle, Dortmund; Attendance: 0 Referees: Bolic, Hurich (AUT)
14 February 2021; 16:00	Smits 7	(17–12)	Abbingh 8	Helmut Körnig Halle, Dortmund; Attendance: 0 Referees: Bolic, Hurich (AUT)
14 February 2021; 16:00	1× (yellow card) 2× (suspension)	Report	1× (yellow card) 4× (suspension)	Helmut Körnig Halle, Dortmund; Attendance: 0 Referees: Bolic, Hurich (AUT)

Cancelled (Note: The match, originally scheduled for 11 October 2020, was postponed after restrictions of the government in Vâlcea.)	SCM Râmnicu Vâlcea (Romania)	0–10	(Croatia) HC Podravka Vegeta

Cancelled (Note: The match, originally scheduled for 22 November 2020, was postponed.)	Borussia Dortmund (Germany)	0–10	(Romania) SCM Râmnicu Vâlcea

Cancelled (Note: The match, originally scheduled for 24 October 2020, was postponed after restrictions of the government in Vâlcea.)	SCM Râmnicu Vâlcea (Romania)	0–10	(Germany) Borussia Dortmund

Cancelled (Note: The match, originally scheduled for 24 October 2020, was postponed after restrictions of the government in Vâlcea.)	SCM Râmnicu Vâlcea (Romania)	10–0 (Note: Because the match could not be played, the EHF decided to assess the game, after the french were unable to travel.)	(France) Brest Bretagne Handball
