= 2020–21 Women's EHF Champions League =

Women's EHF Champions League
- 2020–21

Tournament information
- Sport: Handball
- Dates: 12 September 2020–30 May 2021
- Teams: 16
- Website: ehfcl.com

Final positions
- Champions: (Norway) Vipers Kristiansand
- Runner-up: (France) Brest Bretagne Handball

Tournament statistics
- Matches played: 127
- Goals scored: 6963 (54.83 per match)
- Attendance: 58,183 (458 per match)
- Top scorer(s): (Slovenia) Ana Gros (135 goals)

The 2020–21 Women's EHF Champions League was the 28th edition of Europe's premier club handball tournament, running from 12 September 2020 to 30 May 2021.

There was no defending champion, after the season before was cancelled due to the COVID-19 pandemic.

Vipers Kristiansand defeated Brest Bretagne Handball to win their first title.

Because of this pandemic, each local health department allowed a different number of spectators.

== Format ==
The competition began with a group stage featuring 16 teams divided in two groups. Matches were played in a double round-robin system with home-and-away fixtures. In Groups A and B, originally the top two teams would have qualified for the quarterfinals, with teams ranked third to sixth entering the playoffs. After a decision by the EHF, all teams advanced.

The knockout stage included four rounds: the round of 16, quarterfinals, and a final-four tournament comprising two semifinals and the final. The teams were paired against each other in two-legged home-and-away matches, with the aggregate winners qualifying to the next round.

In the final four tournament, the semifinals and the final were played as single matches at a pre-selected host venue.

== Team allocation ==
A total of 21 teams from 15 countries submitted their application for a place in the competition's group stage before the deadline of 10 June 2020. The final list of 16 participants was revealed by the EHF Executive Committee on 19 June.

(Croatia) Podravka Vegeta	(Denmark) Team Esbjerg	(Denmark) Odense Håndbold	(France) Metz Handball
(France) Brest Bretagne Handball	(Germany) Borussia Dortmund	(Germany) SG BBM Bietigheim	(Hungary) Győri Audi ETO KC
(Hungary) FTC-Rail Cargo Hungaria	(Montenegro) ŽRK Budućnost	(Norway) Vipers Kristiansand	(Romania) SCM Râmnicu Vâlcea
(Romania) CSM Bucureşti	(Russia) Rostov-Don	(Russia) CSKA Moscow	(Slovenia) Krim Mercator

Wildcard rejection
(Czech Republic) DHK Baník Most	(North Macedonia) ŽRK Kumanovo	(Norway) Storhamar Håndball Elite	(Sweden) H 65 Höör
(Turkey) Kastamonu Bld. GSK			

== Group stage ==
The draw was held on 1 July 2020 at the EHF headquarters in Vienna, Austria. The 16 teams were drawn into two groups of eight, with the restriction that teams from the same national association could not be drawn into the same group.

In each group, teams play against each other in a double round-robin format, with home and away matches. After completion of the group stage matches, the top two teams from each group would have qualified directly for the quarterfinals, and the four teams ranked 3rd–6th advance to the playoffs, but on 10 February 2021, it was announced that all 16 teams advance from the group stage.

Tiebreakers
In the group stage, teams are ranked according to points (2 points for a win, 1 point for a draw, 0 points for a loss). After completion of the group stage, if two or more teams have scored the same number of points, the ranking will be determined as follows:
1. Highest number of points in matches between the teams directly involved;
2. Superior goal difference in matches between the teams directly involved;
3. Highest number of goals scored in matches between the teams directly involved (or in the away match in case of a two-team tie);
4. Superior goal difference in all matches of the group;
5. Highest number of plus goals in all matches of the group;

If the ranking of one of these teams is determined, the above criteria are consecutively followed until the ranking of all teams is determined. If no ranking can be determined, a decision shall be obtained by EHF through drawing of lots.

During the group stage, only criteria 4–5 apply to determine the provisional ranking of teams.

=== Group A ===
Pos	Team	Pld	W	D	L	GF	GA	GD	Pts	ROS	MET	BUC	FER	VIP	ESB	KRI	BIE
1	(Russia) Rostov-Don	14	10	1	3	331	308	+23	21	—	30–26	0–10	26–24	10–0	28–24	23–23	27–21
2	(France) Metz Handball	14	10	0	4	389	354	+35	20	27–26	—	25–22	30–29	28–29	31–29	33–27	36–27
3	(Romania) CSM Bucureşti	14	8	1	5	331	309	+22	17	22–27	31–26	—	25–19	22–29	28–26	22–22	10–0
4	(Hungary) FTC-Rail Cargo Hungaria	14	8	0	6	386	378	+8	16 (Note: FTC-Rail Cargo Hungaria 61–54 Vipers Kristiansand)	25–26	32–30	31–27	—	30–28	24–28	32–25	24–35
5	(Norway) Vipers Kristiansand	14	7	2	5	327	320	+7	16	23–24	0–10	30–25	26–31	—	28–28	37–30	10–0
6	(Denmark) Team Esbjerg	14	5	2	7	374	351	+23	12	24–25	25–28	29–30	21–24	27–27	—	33–23	37–29
7	(Slovenia) RK Krim Mercator	14	2	3	9	325	375	−50	7	28–27	22–26	23–25	26–32	26–27	0–10	—	28–26
8	(Germany) SG BBM Bietigheim	14	1	1	12	318	386	−68	3	31–32	25–33	22–32	25–29	29–33	26–33	22–22	—

Source: EHF

=== Group B ===
Pos	Team	Pld	W	D	L	GF	GA	GD	Pts	GYO	MOS	BRE	ODE	BUD	VAL	DOR	KOP
1	(Hungary) Győri Audi ETO KC	14	10	4	0	457	353	+104	24	—	31–24	27–27	32–25	34–29	38–31	38–25	43–28
2	(Russia) CSKA Moscow	14	11	1	2	404	350	+54	23	27–27	—	25–24	27–23	27–23	30–20	35–28	30–26
3	(France) Brest Bretagne Handball	14	6	5	3	384	349	+35	17	25–25	28–30	—	32–21	28–28	28–21	33–33	32–25
4	(Denmark) Odense Håndbold	14	6	1	7	384	370	+14	13	32–32	26–25	24–31	—	30–21	25–26	32–27	35–20
5	(Montenegro) Budućnost	14	5	2	7	363	377	−14	12	21–26	22–25	22–22	27–24	—	29–28	31–27	33–26
6	(Romania) SCM Râmnicu Vâlcea	14	5	0	9	263	319	−56	10	20–37	24–34	10–0	21–30	25–23	—	0–10	0–10
7	(Germany) Borussia Dortmund	14	4	1	9	347	391	−44	9	24–34	28–29	29–41	32–24	26–28	0–10	—	32–31
8	(Croatia) HC Podravka Vegeta	14	2	0	12	326	419	−93	4	15–33	20–26	29–33	17–33	29–26	25–27	25–26	—

Source: EHF

Note All matches ending with a 10–0 results were assessed by the EHF.

== Knockout stage ==
Originally, the top six teams advanced but on 10 February 2021, after a decision by the EHF Executive Committee, it was announced that all 16 teams advance from the group stage.

=== Round of 16 ===
Team 1	Agg.	Team 2	1st leg	2nd leg
SCM Râmnicu Vâlcea (Romania)	51–54	(Romania) CSM Bucureşti	24–33	27–21
Team Esbjerg (Denmark)	54–63	(France) Brest Bretagne Handball	27–33	27–30
ŽRK Budućnost (Montenegro)	50–48	(Hungary) FTC-Rail Cargo Hungaria	22–19	28–29
Vipers Kristiansand (Norway)	65–62	(Denmark) Odense Håndbold	35–36	30–26
Podravka Vegeta (Croatia)	44–71	(Russia) Rostov-Don	20–29	24–42
SG BBM Bietigheim (Germany)	48–69	(Hungary) Győri Audi ETO KC	20–37	28–32
Borussia Dortmund (Germany)	0–20 (Note: The matches, scheduled for 12 and 14 March 2021, were assessed by the EHF after Dortmund did not travel to France.)	(France) Metz Handball	0–10	0–10
Krim Mercator (Slovenia)	46–47	(Russia) CSKA Moscow	25–20	21–27

=== Quarterfinals ===
Team 1	Agg.	Team 2	1st leg	2nd leg
CSM București (Romania)	51–51 (a)	(Russia) CSKA Moscow	32–27	19–24
Brest Bretagne Handball (France)	60–50	(France) Metz Handball	34–24	26–26
ŽRK Budućnost (Montenegro)	40–54	(Hungary) Győri Audi ETO KC	19–30	21–24
Vipers Kristiansand (Norway)	57–50	(Russia) Rostov-Don	34–27	23–23

=== Final four ===
Location of László Papp Budapest Sports Arena in Budapest

The final four will held at the László Papp Budapest Sports Arena in Budapest, Hungary on 4 and 5 June 2021.

Semi-finals
29 May
(Hungary) Győri Audi ETO KC	23 (2)
(France) Brest Bretagne Handball (Pen)	23 (4)
29 May
(Norway) Vipers Kristiansand	33
(Russia) CSKA Moscow	30

Final
30 May
(France) Brest Bretagne Handball	28
(Norway) Vipers Kristiansand	34
Third place
30 May
(Hungary) Győri Audi ETO KC	32
(Russia) CSKA Moscow	21

==== Final ====
30 May 2021; 18:00	Brest Bretagne Handball (France)	28–34	(Norway) Vipers Kristiansand	László Papp Budapest Sports Arena, Budapest; Attendance: 2,300; Referees: Năstase, Stancu (ROU)
30 May 2021; 18:00	Gros 8	(14–18)	Reistad 12	László Papp Budapest Sports Arena, Budapest; Attendance: 2,300; Referees: Năstase, Stancu (ROU)
30 May 2021; 18:00	1× (yellow card) 2× (suspension)	Report	3× (yellow card) 6× (suspension)	László Papp Budapest Sports Arena, Budapest; Attendance: 2,300; Referees: Năstase, Stancu (ROU)

== Top goalscorers ==
Rank	Player	Club	Goals
1	(Slovenia) Ana Gros	(France) Brest Bretagne Handball	135
2	(Romania) Cristina Neagu	(Romania) CSM Bucureşti	115
3	(Norway) Veronica Kristiansen	(Hungary) Győri Audi ETO KC	97
4	(Montenegro) Jovanka Radičević	(Montenegro) ŽRK Budućnost	94
5	(Croatia) Dejana Milosavljević	(Croatia) RK Podravka Koprivnica	88
5	(Norway) Henny Reistad	(Norway) Vipers Kristiansand	88
7	(Norway) Stine Bredal Oftedal	(Hungary) Győri Audi ETO KC	87
8	(Netherlands) Lois Abbingh	(Denmark) Odense Håndbold	84
8	(France) Estelle Nze Minko	(Hungary) Győri Audi ETO KC	84
10	(Denmark) Mette Tranborg	(Denmark) Team Esbjerg	77

== Awards ==
The DELO EHF Champions League Women's All-star Team 2020–21:"Fan favourite Oftedal leads Györ quartet in All-star Team". European Handball Federation. 28 May 2021.

Award / position	Player
Goalkeeper	(France) Amandine Leynaud (Győri Audi ETO KC)
Right wing	(Hungary) Viktória Lukács (Győri Audi ETO KC)
Right back	(Norway) Nora Mørk (Vipers Kristiansand)
Centre back	(Norway) Stine Bredal Oftedal (Győri Audi ETO KC)
Left back	(Romania) Cristina Neagu (CSM București)
Left wing	(Montenegro) Majda Mehmedović (Budućnost)
Pivot	(France) Pauletta Foppa (Brest Bretagne Handball)
Best defender	(Brazil) Eduarda Amorim (Győri Audi ETO KC)
Best young player	(Norway) Henny Reistad (Vipers Kristiansand)
Best coach	(Norway) Ole Gustav Gjekstad (Vipers Kristiansand)
EHF FINAL4 MVP	(Norway) Henny Reistad (Vipers Kristiansand) "Coverage of the DELO EHF FINAL4 2021". European Handball Federation. 30 May 2021.

Best coach: (Norway) Ole Gustav Gjekstad
EHF FINAL4 MVP: (Norway) Henny Reistad
Best young player: (Norway) Henny Reistad

== Attendances ==
Pos	Team	Total	High	Low	Average	Change
1	Final Four in Budapest	9,400	2,500	2,300	2,350	n/a
2	(France) Brest Bretagne Handball	9,269	3,500	0	1,159	n/a
3	(Russia) Rostov-Don	10,127	2,625	0	1,125	n/a
4	(France) Metz Handball	7,756	2,756	0	862	n/a
5	(Hungary) Győri Audi ETO KC	7,739	2,631	0	860	n/a
6	(Russia) CSKA Moscow	4,246	1,900	0	472	n/a
7	(Norway) Vipers Kristiansand	3,025	2,625	0	378	n/a
8	(Hungary) FTC-Rail Cargo Hungaria	2,520	1,000	0	360	n/a
9	(Denmark) Team Esbjerg	2,250	450	0	321	n/a
10	(Denmark) Odense Håndbold	1,558	396	0	223	n/a
11	(Germany) BV Borussia 09 Dortmund	1,587	987	0	198	n/a
12	(Germany) SG BBM Bietigheim	770	420	0	96	n/a
13	(Croatia) HC Podravka Vegeta	530	230	0	66	n/a
14	(Montenegro) Budućnost	30	20	0	4	n/a
15	(Romania) CSM București	0	0	0	0	n/a
16	(Slovenia) RK Krim Mercator	0	0	0	0	n/a
17	(Romania) SCM Râmnicu Vâlcea	0	0	0	0	n/a
	League total	60,807	3,500	0	461	n/a

Source: EHF Champions League
Notes:
1: Team did not participate in the previous Women's EHF Champions League season.

1. CSKA Moscow and BV Borussia 09 Dortmund did not participate in the previous Women's EHF Champions League season.
2. The EHF FINAL4 was played at the László Papp Budapest Sports Arena in Budapest, Hungary. The attendance figures for the four matches were 2,500, 2,300, 2,300 and 2,300 spectators.
3. Attendance during the season was restricted by national and local regulations related to the COVID-19 pandemic. Numerous matches were therefore played behind closed doors.

== See also ==
- 2020–21 Women's EHF European League
