= Éva Kiss =

Hungarian handball player (born 1987)

Personal information
- Nationality: Hungarian
- Born: 10 July 1987 (age 39) Nádudvar, Hungary
- Height: 1.89 m (6 ft 2 in)

Sport
- Sport: Handball
- Position: Goalkeeper
- Current club: Retired

Senior clubs
- Years: Team
- 2003–2011: Debreceni VSC
- 2011–2012: Veszprém Barabás KC
- 2012–2013: Siófok KC
- 2013–2015: Fehérvár KC
- 2015–2020: Győri ETO KC
National team
Years	Team	Apps	(Gls)
2009–2020	Hungary	103	(1)

Teams managed
- 2020–: Győri ETO KC (goalkeeping coach)
Medal record
European Championship
Bronze medal – third place	2012 Serbia
- Updated on 9 December 2019

Éva Kiss (born 10 July 1987) is a retired Hungarian handball goalkeeper who most recently played for Győri ETO KC and the Hungarian national team. Since the 2020–21 season she serves as a goalkeeping coach at the academy of Győri ETO KC. From 2022–23 season she is the goalkeeping coach for the first team as well.

She made her international debut on 22 September 2009 against Germany.

== Achievements ==
- Nemzeti Bajnokság I:
  - Winner: 2016, 2017, 2018, 2019
  - Silver Medallist: 2010, 2011
  - Bronze Medallist: 2009
- Magyar Kupa:
  - Winner: 2016, 2018, 2019
  - Silver Medallist: 2009, 2011, 2017
- EHF Champions League:
  - Winner: 2017, 2018, 2019
  - Silver Medalist: 2016
- EHF Cup:
  - Semifinalist: 2006
- European Championship:
  - Bronze Medalist: 2012

== Personal life ==
She has a degree in Finance and Accounting. Her daughter, Eszter was born on 1 January 2021.
