= Dorottya Faluvégi =

Hungarian handball player (born 1998)

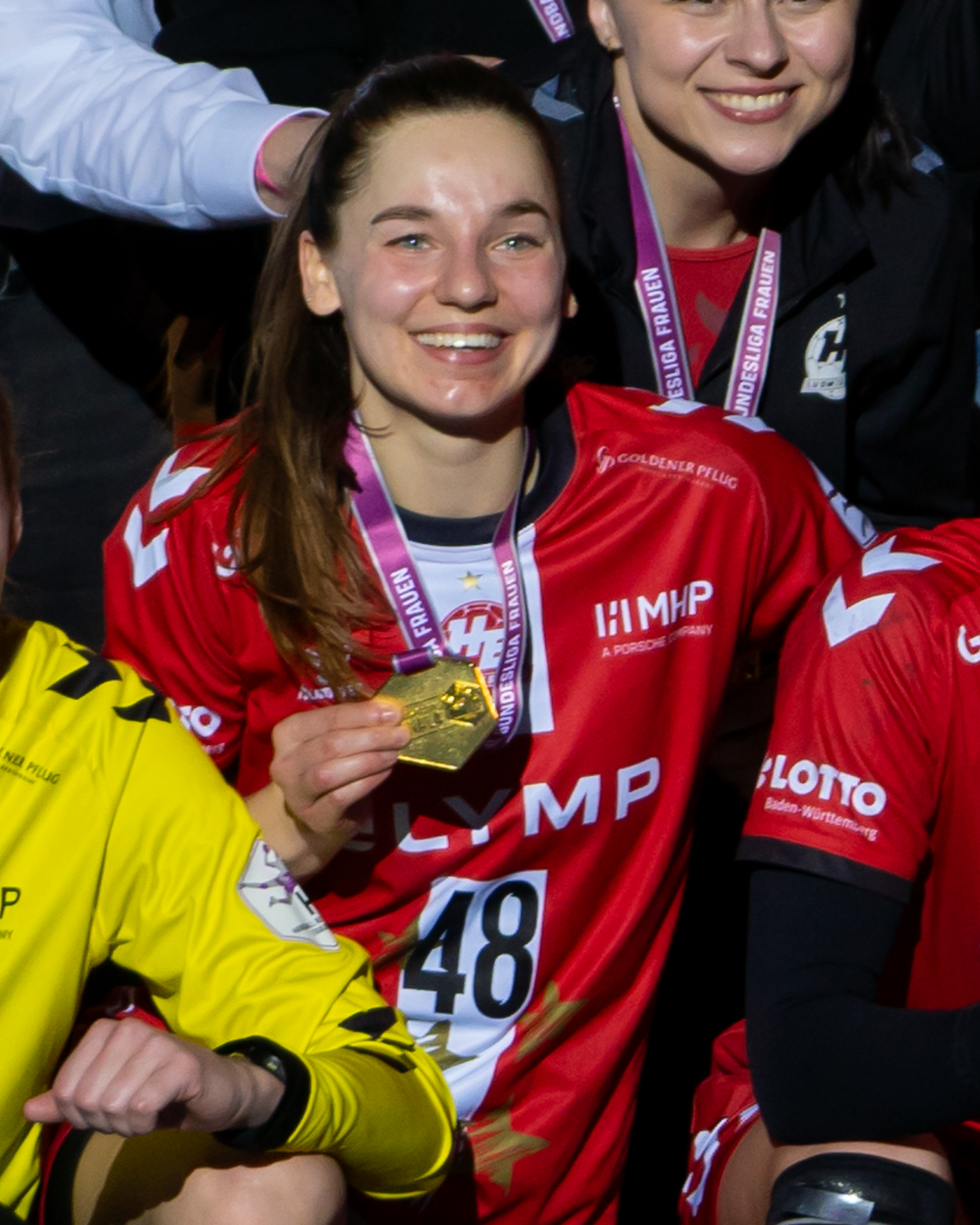

Personal information
- Nationality: Hungarian
- Born: 31 March 1998 (age 28) Budapest, Hungary
- Height: 1.67 m (5 ft 6 in)

Sport
- Sport: Handball
- Position: Right wing
- Current club: CSM București
- Number: 48

Senior clubs
- Years: Team
- 2014–2019: Ferencvárosi TC
- 2019–2023: Győri ETO KC
- 2023–2025: SG BBM Bietigheim
- 02/2026–: CSM București
National team
Years	Team	Apps	(Gls)
2016–	Hungary	54	(84)
Medal record
European Championship
Bronze medal – third place	2024 Austria/Hungary/Switzerland
Junior World Championship
Gold medal – first place	2018 Hungary
- Updated on 17 September 2025

Dorottya Faluvégi (born 31 March 1998) is a Hungarian female handballer for CSM București and the Hungarian national team.

== Achievements ==
- IHF Women's Junior World Championship:
  - Winner: 2018
- Magyar Kupa:
  - Winner: 2017, 2021
- Hungarian Championship
  - Winner: 2022, 2023
- Bundesliga:
  - Winner: 2024

== Individual awards ==
- Junior handball player of the year in Hungary: 2016
- All-Star Right Wing of the Junior World Championship: 2018

== Personal life ==
Her brother, Rudolf Faluvégi is also a professional handball player. In 2020 she graduated from the Budapest University of Technology and Economics under the Faculty of Economic and Social Sciences, earning a BSc degree in Business and Management. She got married in 2022.
