= Polina Vedekhina =

Russian handball player (born 1994)

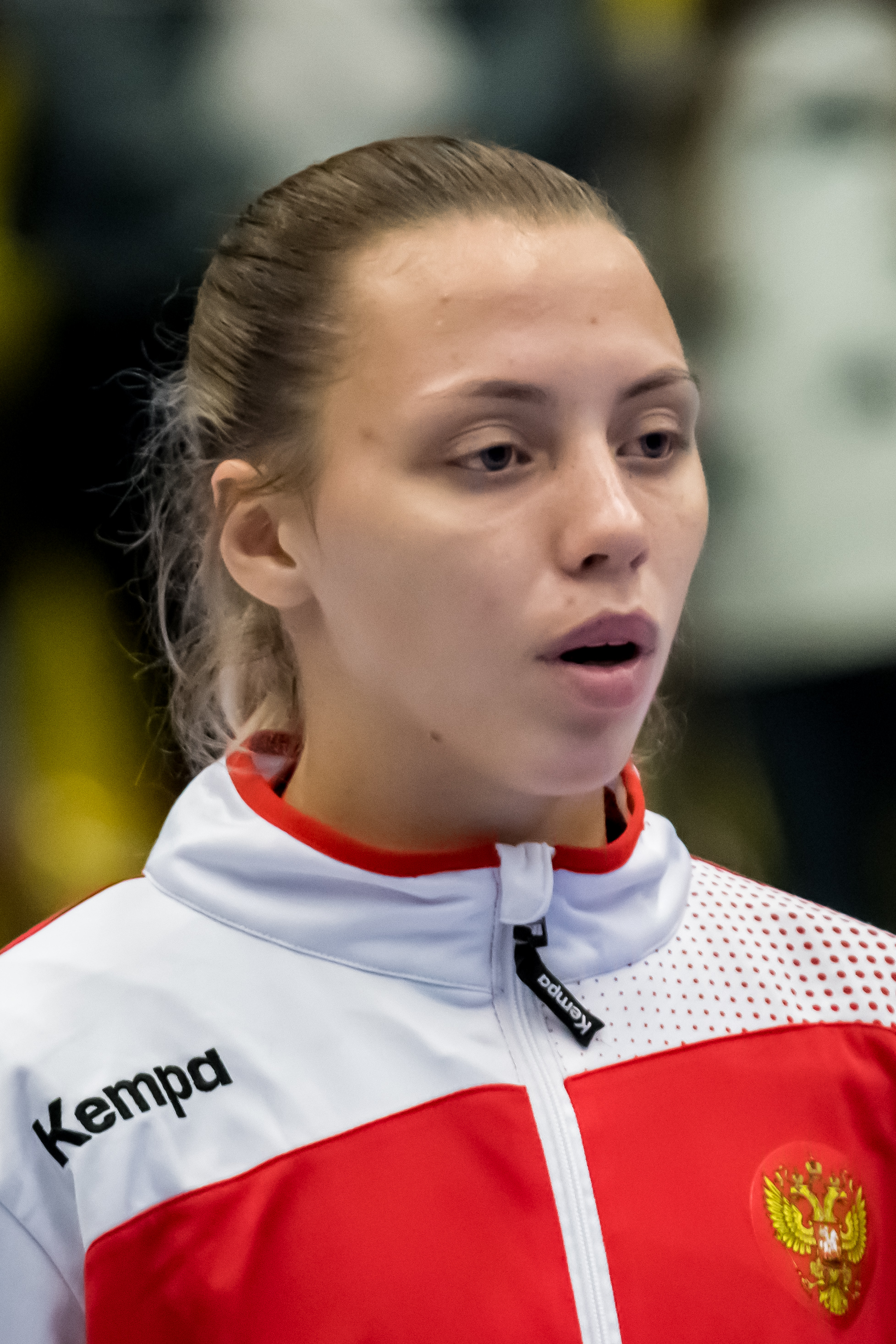

Personal information
- Nationality: Russian
- Born: 6 January 1994 (age 32) Volgograd, Russia
- Height: 1.77 m (5 ft 10 in)

Sport
- Sport: Handball
- Position: Left back
- Current club: Astrakhanochka
- Number: 14

Senior clubs
- Years: Team
- 2011–2017: Dinamo-Sinara
- 2017–2019: Lada Togliatti
- 2019–2022: CSKA Moscow
- 2022–: Astrakhanochka
National team
Years	Team	Apps	(Gls)
2015–	Russia	47	(100)
Medal record
Representing ROC
Olympic Games
Silver medal – second place	2020 Tokyo	Team
Representing Russia
World Junior Championship
Silver medal – second place	2014 Croatia	Team
World Youth Championship
Silver medal – second place	2012 Montenegro	Team
European Junior Championship
Gold medal – first place	2013 Denmark	Team
European Youth Championship
Gold medal – first place	2011 Czech Republic	Team
Summer Universiade
Gold medal – first place	2015 Gwangju	Team

Polina Yuryevna Vedekhina (Russian: Полина Юрьевна Ведёхина; born 6 January 1994) is a Russian handballer who plays for Astrakhanochka and the Russia national team.

== International honours ==
- EHF Champions League:
  - Semifinalist: 2021
- EHF Cup Winners' Cup:
  - Semifinalist: 2012

== Individual awards ==
- Best Defence Player of the European U-17 Championship: 2011
