= Ewgenija Minevskaja =

German handball player (born 1992)

Personal information
- Nationality: German
- Born: 31 October 1992 (age 33) Minsk, Belarus
- Height: 1.83 m (6 ft 0 in)

Sport
- Sport: Handball
- Position: Left back

Youth career
- Years: Team
- 1999–2003: DJK/MJC Trier
- 2003–2005: PSV Rostock
- 2005–2008: Thüringer HC

Senior clubs
- Years: Team
- 2008–2013: Thüringer HC
- 2013–2015: TuS Metzingen
- 2015–2017: HC Leipzig
- 2017–2019: TuS Metzingen
- 2019–2020: Brest Bretagne HB
- 2020–2021: SCM Râmnicu Vâlcea
National team
Years	Team	Apps	(Gls)
2012–2020	Germany	95	(183)

Ewgenija Minevskaja (Belarusian: Яўгенія Мінеўская; born 31 October 1992) is a German handball player who was capped for the German national team.

== Personal life ==
Both of her parents were handball players. Her father, Andrej won the Olympic Games in 1992 with the Unified Team, while her mother Svetlana had been even more successful, leading the Soviet Union's women's team to gold at the World Championships 1986 and 1990.

== Individual awards ==
- Bundesliga Top Scorer: 2014
