= Viktória Győri-Lukács =

Hungarian handball player (born 1995)

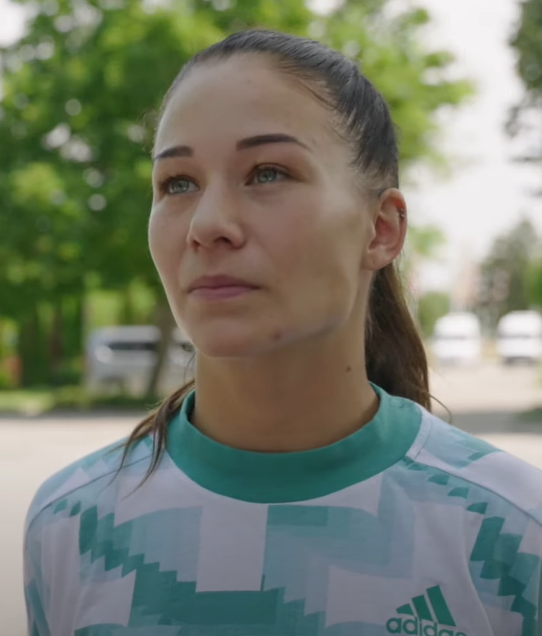

Personal information
- Nationality: Hungarian
- Born: 31 October 1995 (age 30) Budapest, Hungary
- Height: 1.68 m (5 ft 6 in)

Sport
- Sport: Handball
- Position: Right wing
- Current club: Győri ETO KC
- Number: 22

Youth career
- Years: Team
- 2005–2009: Budapesti Spartacus
- 2009–2010: Pénzügyőr SE

Senior clubs
- Years: Team
- 2010–2020: Ferencvárosi TC
- 2013–2014: → Siófok KC (loan)
- 2020–: Győri ETO KC
National team
| Years | Team | Apps | (Gls) |
| 2014– | Hungary | 139 | (436) |
Medal record
European Championship
| Bronze medal – third place | 2024 Austria/Hungary/Switzerland |
Junior European Championship
| Silver medal – second place | 2013 Denmark |
- Updated on 2 July 2025

Viktória Győri-Lukács (born 31 October 1995) is a Hungarian professional handballer for Győri ETO KC and the Hungarian national team.

At the 2024 European Championship she was part of the Hungarian team that won bronze medals, losing to Norway in semifinal and beating France in the third place play-off. This was the first Hungarian medals since 2012.

== Achievements ==
- Nemzeti Bajnokság I:
  - Winner: 2015, 2022, 2023, 2025
- Magyar Kupa:
  - Winner: 2017, 2021
- EHF Champions League:
  - Winner: 2024, 2025
- EHF Cup Winners' Cup:
  - Winner: 2012

== Individual awards ==
- All-Star Right Wing of the European Championship: 2024
- All-Star Team Best Right Wing of the EHF Champions League: 2021
- EHF Excellence Awards: Right Wing of the Season 2023/24, 2024/25

== Personal life ==
She is married to fellow handballer, Mátyás Győri. They announced in July 2025 that they're expecting twins. Their twin daughters, Emma and Zoé, were born in December 2025.
