= Dejana Milosavljević =

Croatian handball player (born 1994)

Personal information
- Nationality: Croatian
- Born: 23 November 1994 (age 31) Požega, Croatia
- Height: 1.72 m (5 ft 8 in)

Sport
- Sport: Handball
- Position: Left back
- Current club: RK Podravka Koprivnica
- Number: 13

Senior clubs
- Years: Team
- –2013: RK Orijent Rijeka
- 2013–2015: RK Sesvete Agroproteinka
- 2015–2017: ŽRK Zamet
- 2017–2018: ŽRK Koka Varaždin
- 2018–2022: RK Podravka Koprivnica
- 2022–2023: Siófok KC
- 2023–2024: SCM Craiova
- 2024–2026: HC Dunărea Brăila
- 2026–: RK Podravka Koprivnica
National team
Years	Team	Apps	(Gls)
2018–	Croatia	72	(207)
Medal record
Women's Handball
Representing Croatia
European Championship
Bronze medal – third place	2020 Denmark
- Updated on 29 October 2026

Dejana Milosavljević (born 23 November 1994) is a Croatian female handball player for RK Podravka Koprivnica and the Croatian national team.

She participated at the 2018 European Women's Handball Championship.
