= Simona Arghir-Sandu Trophy =

Handball award

- Sport: Handball
- Awarded for: Liga Națională's top goal scorer

History
- First award: 1958–59 LNHF season
- Most recent: Alina Vătu; Dunărea Brăila

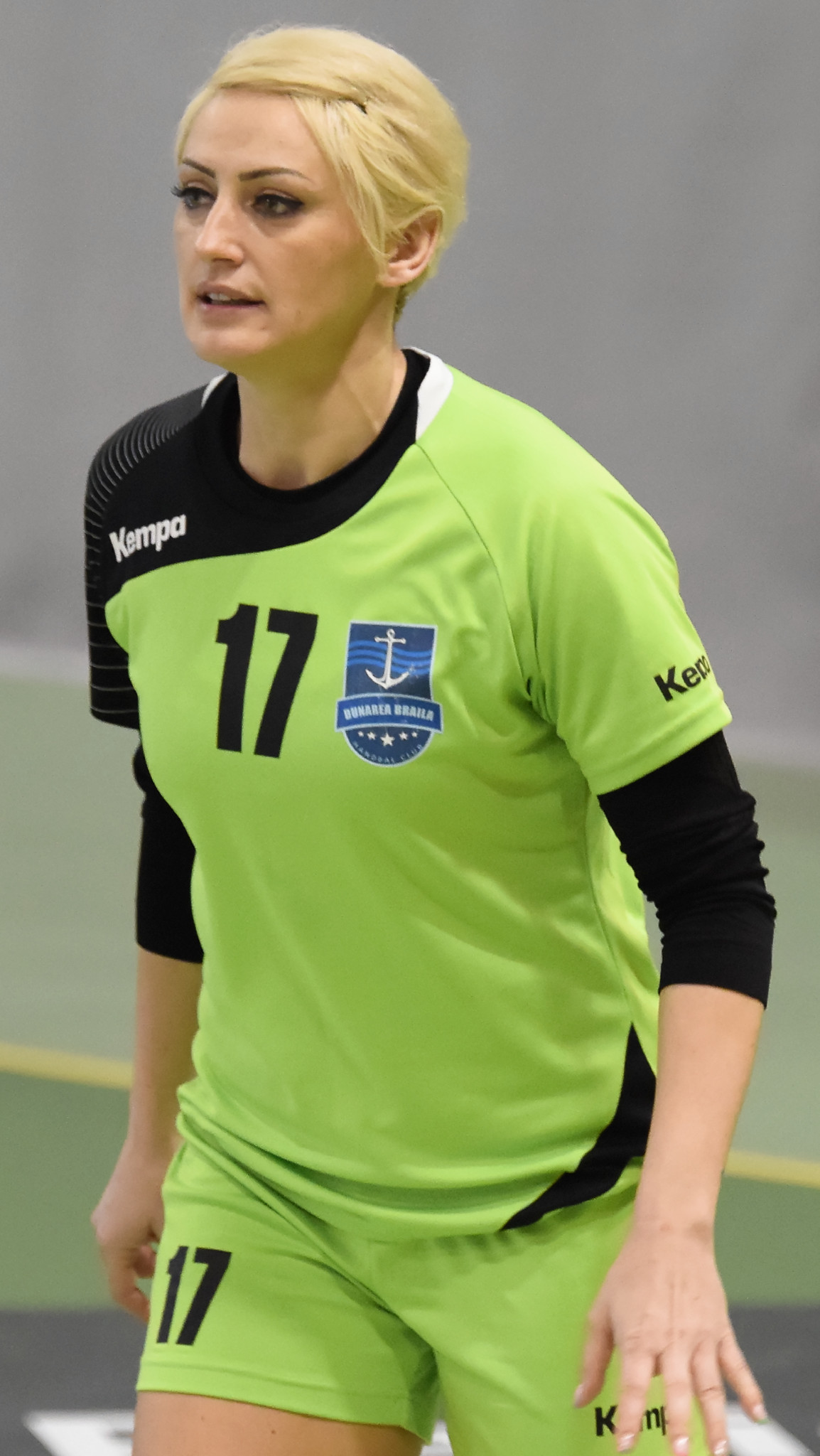
Ramona Farcău won the trophy in 2005.

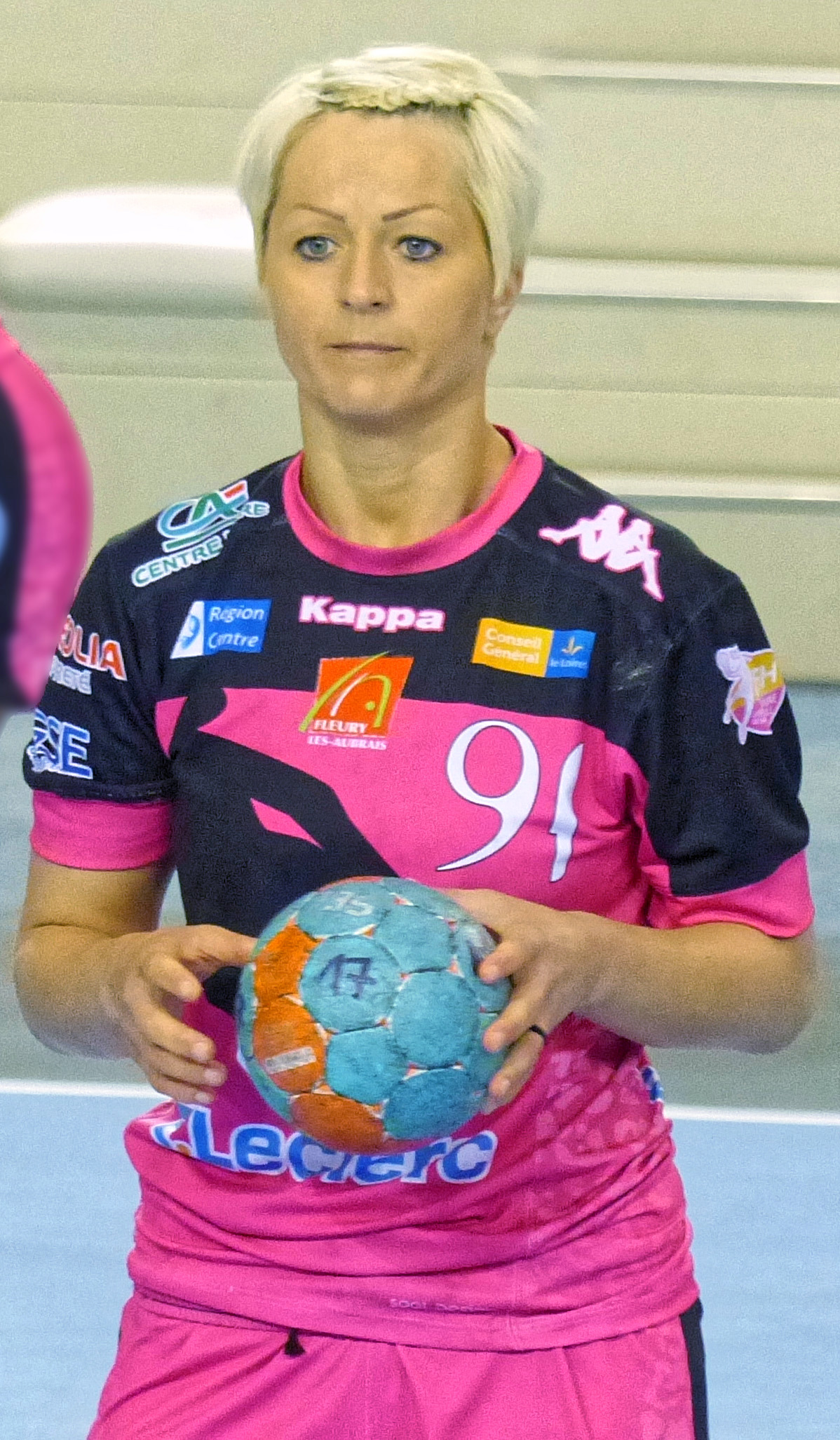
Ionela Stanca won the trophy in 2007.

The Simona Arghir-Sandu Trophy is awarded annually to the leading goal scorer in the Liga Națională (LNHF). It is named in honour of legendary right back Simona Arghir-Sandu. Arghir-Sandu died of cancer in 1995 at the age of 46. The current holder is Alina Vătu of Dunărea Brăila, who scored 180 goals during the 2018–19 season.

== Winners ==
Season	Player	Team	Goals
1999–00	Carmen Amariei	Oltchim Râmnicu Vâlcea	178
2000–01	Camelia Tătar-Bucur	Fibrex Săvinești	N/A
2001–02	Măriuța Lipan	CSM Sebeș	219
2002–03	Camelia Tătar-Bucur (2)	Fibrex Săvinești	N/A
2003–04	Alina Braniște	Rulmentul Brașov	N/A
2004–05	Ramona Maier	Silcotub Zalău	242
2005–06	Daniela Crap	Silcotub Zalău	229
2006–07	Ionela Gâlcă	Oltchim Râmnicu Vâlcea	271
2007–08	Ada Moldovan	HCM Roman	231
2008–09	Ada Moldovan (2)	Dunărea Brăila	235
2009–10	Ada Moldovan (3)	Dunărea Brăila	244
2010–11	Carmen Cartaș	Cetate Deva	210
2011–12	Diana Druțu	Danubius Galaţi	182
2012–13	Iryna Glibko	CSU Danubius Galați	177
2013–14	Carmen Cartaș (2)	Cetate Deva	205
2014–15	Andreea Enescu	Neptun Constanța	271
2015–16	Roxana Han	Măgura Cisnădie	211
2016–17	Cristina Zamfir	SCM Craiova	186
2017–18	Iryna Glibko (2)	SCM Râmnicu Vâlcea	175
2018–19	Alina Vătu	Dunărea Brăila	180
