= 2011–12 Liga Națională (women's handball) =

- Season champions: CS Oltchim Râmnicu Vâlcea
- Runners-up: CS Universitatea Jolidon Cluj-Napoca
- Relegated to Divizia A: Știința Bacău; CSM Cetate Devatrans Deva; CSU Neptun Constanţa

Seasons
- 2010–11 2012–13

The 2011–12 Liga Națională was the 54th season of Romanian Women's Handball League, the top-level women's professional handball league. The league comprises 14 teams. Oltchim Râmnicu Vâlcea were the defending champions, for the fifth season in a row, and they won the title for a 6th time in a row.

== Teams 2011–2012 ==
Location of teams in the Romanian Women's Handball League
- CSM București
- HCM Baia Mare
- Corona Braşov
- SCM Craiova
- Dunărea Brăila
- Oltchim Râmnicu Vâlcea
- Danubius Galaţi
- CSM Ploieşti
- HCM Roman
- Universitatea Jolidon Cluj-Napoca
- HC Zalău
- CSU Neptun Constanţa
- CSM Cetate Devatrans Deva
- Știința Bacău

== Standings ==
Pos	Team	Pld	W	D	L	GF	GD	Pts	Qualification or relegation
1	CS Oltchim Râmnicu Vâlcea (C)	26	25	0	1	908	644	50	2012–13 EHF Women's Champions League
2	CS Universitatea Jolidon Cluj-Napoca	26	19	2	5	775	697	40	2012–13 EHF Women's Champions League
3	HC Zalău	26	16	5	5	661	553	37	2012–13 Women's EHF Cup
4	HC Dunărea Brăila	26	17	2	7	701	642	36	2012–13 Women's EHF Cup
5	HC Oțelul Galați	26	13	1	12	705	673	27	2012–13 Women's EHF Cup Winners' Cup
6	ASC Corona 2010 Brașov	26	13	1	12	655	645	27	
7	CSM București	26	12	1	13	730	749	25	
8	HCM Baia Mare	26	11	1	14	654	731	23	
9	HCM Roman	26	10	2	14	630	672	22	
10	CSM Ploieşti	26	8	2	16	687	728	18	
11	CSU Neptun Constanţa (R)	26	8	2	16	669	752	18	Relegation to the 2012–13 Divizia A
12	SCM Craiova	26	8	0	18	631	701	16	
13	CSM Cetate Devatrans Deva (R)	26	6	2	18	609	721	14	Relegation to the 2012–13 Divizia A
14	Știința Bacău (R)	26	5	1	20	630	737	11	Relegation to the 2012–13 Divizia A
