= 2012–13 Liga Națională (women's handball) =

Season of the Romanian Women's Handball League

- Season champions: CS Oltchim Râmnicu Vâlcea
- Runners-up: HCM Baia Mare
- Relegated to Divizia A: HC Danubius Galați

Seasons
- 2011–12 2013–14

The 2012–13 Liga Națională was the 55th season of Romanian Women's Handball League, the top-level women's professional handball league. The league comprises 11 teams. Z-Terom Iaşi did not register for the new season because it was dissolved. Oltchim Râmnicu Vâlcea were the defending champions, for the sixth season in a row.

== Teams 2012–2013 ==
Location of teams in the Romanian Women's Handball League
- CSM București
- HCM Baia Mare
- Corona Braşov
- SCM Craiova
- Dunărea Brăila
- Oltchim Râmnicu Vâlcea
- Danubius Galaţi
- CSM Ploieşti
- HCM Roman
- Universitatea Jolidon Cluj-Napoca
- HC Zalău

== Standings ==
Pos	Team	Pld	W	D	L	GF	GD	Pts	Qualification or relegation
1	CS Oltchim Râmnicu Vâlcea (C)	20	20	0	0	651	470	40	
2	HCM Baia Mare	20	15	0	5	567	516	30	2013–14 EHF Women's Champions League
3	CS Universitatea Jolidon Cluj-Napoca	20	10	2	8	560	553	22	2013–14 Women's EHF Cup
4	HC Zalău	20	10	2	8	493	459	22	2013–14 Women's EHF Cup
5	HC Dunărea Brăila	20	10	1	9	495	500	21	
6	ASC Corona 2010 Brașov	20	9	1	10	532	531	19	2013–14 Women's EHF Cup Winners' Cup
7	HCM Roman	20	9	1	10	450	474	19	
8	CSM București	20	8	0	12	525	533	16	
9	CSM Ploieşti	20	5	3	12	480	551	13	
10	SCM Craiova	20	4	3	13	445	528	11	
11	HC Danubius Galați (R)	20	3	1	16	480	563	7	Relegation to the 2013–14 Divizia A
