= 2014–15 Liga Națională (women's handball) =

- Season champions: CSM București
- Runners-up: HCM Baia Mare
- Relegated to Divizia A: SC Mureșul Târgu Mureș; CSU Neptun Constanţa; CSM Cetate Devatrans Deva

Seasons
- 2013–14 2015–16

The 2014–15 Liga Națională was the 57th season of Romanian Women's Handball League, the top-level women's professional handball league. The league comprises fourteen teams. HCM Baia Mare were the defending champions.

CSM București won the title.

== Teams for 2014–15 ==
Location of teams in the Romanian Women's Handball League
- CSM București
- HCM Baia Mare
- Corona Braşov
- SCM Craiova
- Dunărea Brăila
- HCM Râmnicu Vâlcea
- Cetate Deva
- CSM Ploieşti
- HCM Roman
- Universitatea Cluj-Napoca
- HC Zalău
- Neptun Constanţa
- CSM Unirea Slobozia
- SC Mureșul Târgu Mureș

== Standings ==
Pos	Team	Pld	W	D	L	GF	GD	Pts	Qualification or relegation
1	CSM București (C)	25	23	0	2	735	529	68*	
2	HCM Baia Mare	24	22	0	2	750	527	66	
3	ASC Corona 2010 Brașov	25	19	3	3	714	559	60	
4	SCM Craiova	25	16	1	8	581	553	49	
5	HCM Roman	25	14	2	9	584	565	44	
6	HC Dunărea Brăila	25	12	1	12	678	683	37	
7	HC Zalău	25	12	1	12	612	629	37	
8	CSM Ploieşti	25	11	1	13	582	615	34	
9	HCM Râmnicu Vâlcea	25	9	2	14	627	670	29	
10	Universitatea Cluj-Napoca	25	8	2	15	681	756	26	
11	CSM Cetate Devatrans Deva (R)	25	7	3	15	632	703	24	
12	CSU Neptun Constanţa (R)	25	6	2	17	579	657	20	
13	CSM Unirea Slobozia	24	6	0	18	583	660	18	
14	SC Mureșul Târgu Mureș (R)	25	0	0	25	564	796	0	

1. * CSM București was docked 1 point.
