= Andreea Enescu =

Romanian handballer (born 1981)

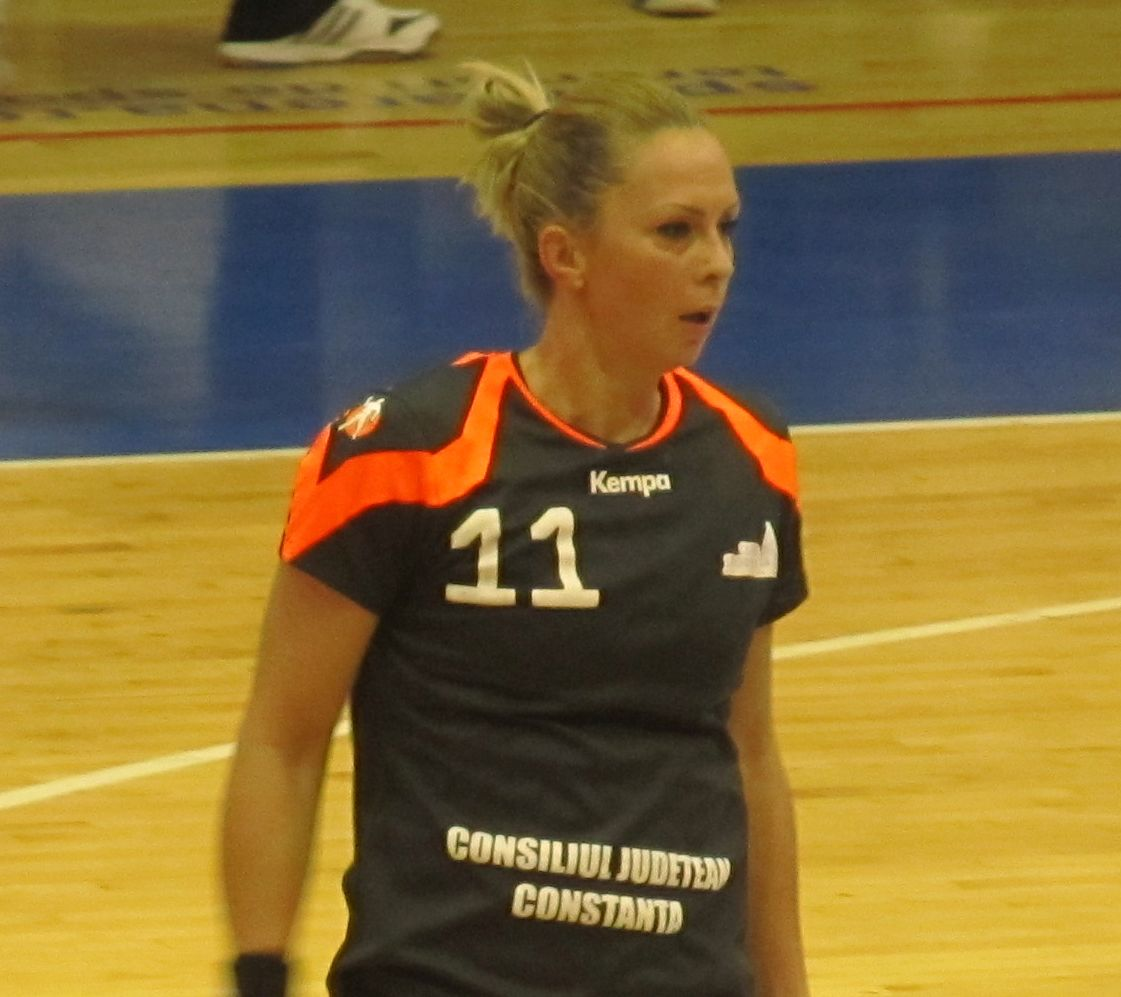

Personal information
- Full name: Andreea Enescu
- Nationality: Romanian
- Born: 4 October 1981 (age 45) Sibiu, Romania
- Height: 1.80 m (5 ft 11 in)

Sport
- Sport: Handball
- Position: Left back
- Current club: CSM Unirea Slobozia

Youth career
- Years: Team
- –: CSȘ Sibiu

Senior clubs
- Years: Team
- –2005: CSM Sibiu
- 2005–2006: CS Oltchim Râmnicu Vâlcea
- 2006–2008: HC Oțelul Galați
- 2008–2009: CSM Ploiești
- 2009–2012: CS Tomis Constanța
- 2012–2013: CSM Ploiești
- 2013–2015: CSU Neptun Constanța
- 2015–2018: CSM Unirea Slobozia
National team
| Years | Team | Apps | (Gls) |
| 2005 | Romania | 4 | (7) |

Andreea Enescu (née Tâlvâc; born 4 October 1981) is a Romanian female handballer who plays for CSM Unirea Slobozia.

== Individual awards ==
- Liga Națională Top Scorer: 2015
