= Gheorghe Ionescu =

Romanian handball coach (born 1943)

Personal information
- Born: 31 January 1943 (age 82); Bucharest, Romania
- Nationality: Romanian

Gheorghe Ionescu (born 31 January 1943) is a Romanian professional handball manager. He graduated from the I.E.F.S. and is nicknamed "Gică".

He is best known for coaching Mureșul Târgu Mureș and Chimistul Râmnicu Vâlcea women's teams, before becoming the Romania national team manager in the 90s. In his first and only tournament as Romania manager, the 1995 World Championship, he reached a World Championship quarter-final with the Romania team. Led by Ionescu, the ladies finished 7th losing only one match and that to Norway in the knockout phase. They beat future Olympic gold medalists Denmark in the group stage.

Ionescu also served as head coach of the Baia Mare, Constructorul Oradea, Cetate Deva, CSM Ploiești, Debreceni VSC women's teams. In 1999 he was coach of Steaua București (men's). In recent years he has been head coach in exotic locations such as Israel, Cyprus and Syria (in the latter he served as head coach of the men's national team).

He worked miracles for Congo (women's) at the 2007 World Championship, beating the Japanese and Kazakhstani teams.

== Achievements ==
=== Club ===
Mureșul Târgu Mureș

- Liga Națională:
  - Winner: 1988
- Cupa României :
  - Winner: 1988

Chimistul Râmnicu Vâlcea

- Liga Națională:
  - Winner: 1990, 1991
- Cupa României :
  - Winner: 1990

=== National team ===
Congo

- African Championship:
  - Bronze Medalist: 2006
