= 2015–16 Liga Națională (women's handball) =

- Season champions: CSM București
- Runners-up: HCM Baia Mare
- Relegated to Divizia A: HCM Baia Mare; Rapid Usl Metrou București; CSM Ploiești; Alba Sebeș

Seasons
- ← 2014–15 2016–17 →

The 2015–16 Liga Națională was the 58th season of Liga Națională, the top-level women's professional handball league. The league comprises fourteen teams. CSM București were the defending champions, and won the title again.

== Teams for season 2015–16 ==
Location of teams in the Romanian Women's Handball League

Club	City	Arena(s)	Capacity
Alba Sebeș	Sebeș	Sala Sporturilor "Florin Fleșeriu"	300
Corona Brașov	Brașov	Sala Sporturilor "D.P. Colibași"	1,600
CSM București	Bucharest	Sala Polivalentă din București	5,300
CSM Ploiești	Ploiești	Sala Sporturilor Olimpia	3,500
Dunărea Brăila	Brăila	Sala Polivalentă "Danubius"	2,000
HC Zalău	Zalău	Sala Sporturilor Zalău	950
HCM Baia Mare	Baia Mare	Sala Sporturilor "Lascăr Pană"	2,500
HCM Râmnicu Vâlcea	Râmnicu Vâlcea	Sala Sporturilor "Traian"	3,126
HCM Roman	Roman	Sala Polivalentă Roman	500
Măgura Cisnădie	Cisnădie	Sala Polivalentă Măgura	820
Rapid București	Bucharest	Sala Rapid	1,500
SCM Craiova	Craiova	Sala Polivalentă Craiova	4,215
Unirea Slobozia	Slobozia	Sala Sporturilor "Andreea Nica"	150
Universitatea Cluj	Cluj-Napoca	Sala Sporturilor "Horia Demian"; Sala Polivalentă Cluj	2,525; 7,308

== League table ==
	Team	Pld	W	D	L	GF	GA	Diff	Pts
1	CSM București (C)	21	21	0	0	662	460	+202	63
2	HCM Baia Mare (R)	21	19	0	2	666	504	+162	57
3	ASC Corona 2010 Brașov	21	13	2	6	601	556	+45	41
4	HC Dunărea Brăila	21	13	1	7	570	532	+38	40
5	HCM Roman	21	12	2	7	542	511	+31	38
6	CSM Ploiești (R)	21	11	3	7	608	566	+42	36
7	SCM Craiova	21	10	2	9	573	577	−4	32
8	HC Zalău	21	10	2	9	555	572	−17	32
9	HCM Râmnicu Vâlcea	21	9	0	12	555	585	−30	27
10	"U" Alexandrion Cluj	21	7	1	13	540	603	−63	22
11	Unirea Slobozia	21	5	1	15	493	570	−77	16
12	Măgura Cisnădie	21	4	1	16	558	637	−79	13
13	Rapid Usl Metrou București (R)	21	4	0	17	555	662	−107	12
14	Alba Sebeș (R)	21	1	1	19	478	621	−143	4

Pld – Played; W – Won; D – Drawn; L – Lost; GF – Goals for; GA – Goals against; Diff – Difference; Pts – Points.

== Season statistics ==
=== Number of teams by counties ===
Pos.	County	No. of teams	Teams
1	Bucharest	2	CSM București and Rapid
2	Alba	1	Alba Sebeș
2	Brașov	1	Corona Brașov
2	Brăila	1	Dunărea Brăila
2	Cluj	1	Universitatea Cluj
2	Dolj	1	SCM Craiova
2	Ialomița	1	Unirea Slobozia
2	Maramureș	1	HCM Baia Mare
2	Neamț	1	HCM Roman
2	Prahova	1	CSM Ploiești
2	Sălaj	1	HC Zalău
2	Sibiu	1	Măgura Cisnădie
2	Vâlcea	1	HCM Râmnicu Vâlcea

== Romenian clubs in European competitions ==
Women's EHF Champions League

- CSM București

Round	Club	Home	Away	Aggregate
Group Phase (Group D)	(Montenegro) Budućnost	22–28	23–23	2nd
Group Phase (Group D)	(Sweden) IK Sävehof	27–22	28–17	2nd
Group Phase (Group D)	(Poland) MKS Selgros Lublin	33–21	30–27	2nd
Main Round (Group 2)	(Hungary) Győri Audi ETO KC	22–24	22–28	4th
Main Round (Group 2)	(North Macedonia) ŽRK Vardar	25–30	21–22	4th
Main Round (Group 2)	(Denmark) FC Midtjylland	24–22	28–23	4th
Quarter-final	(Russia) Rostov-Don	26–25	29–28	–

FINAL 4

Semifinal:[CSM]-[Vardar Skopje]: 27–21; 1-2 Places:[CSM]-[Győr]: 29-26

- HCM Baia Mare

Round		Club	Home	Away	Aggregate
QT	Semi-final	(Belarus) BNTU-BelAZ Minsk Region	31–21		
QT	Final	(Denmark) Team Esbjerg	32–21		
Group Phase (Group A)		(Norway) Larvik HK	29–31	22–27	3rd
Group Phase (Group A)		(Slovenia) RK Krim Mercator	35–28	33–27	3rd
Group Phase (Group A)		(Russia) Rostov-Don	20–22	26–27	3rd
Main Round (Group 1)		(Hungary) FTC-Rail Cargo Hungária	32–24	18–21	4th
Main Round (Group 1)		(France) Fleury Loiret Handball	31–28	18–17	4th
Main Round (Group 1)		(Germany) Thüringer HC	38–27	25–23	4th
Quarter-final		(Montenegro) Budućnost	24–29		–

Women's EHF Cup

- ASC Corona 2010 Brașov

Round	Club	Home	Away	Aggregate
Round 3	(Poland) Pogoń Szczecin	24–24	24–20	48–44
Last 16	(Romania) H.C.M. Roman	26–21	21–22	47–43
Quarter-final	(Denmark) HC Odense	21–21	29–21	50–42
Semi-finals	(Germany) TuS Metzingen	22–26		–

- H.C.M. Roman

Round	Club	Home	Away	Aggregate
Round 3	(Iceland) Fram	29–25	27–22	56–47
Last 16	(Romania) ASC Corona 2010 Brașov	22–21	21–26	43–47

Women's EHF Cup Winners' Cup

- SC Municipal Craiova

Round	Club	Home	Away	Aggregate
Round 3	(Serbia) ŽRK Radnički Kragujevac	28–24	28–22	56–46
Last 16	(Slovenia) RK Krim Mercator	30–29	23–27	53–56
