= 2013–14 Liga Națională (women's handball) =

- Season champions: HCM Baia Mare
- Top scorer: Janina Luca

Seasons
- 2012–13 2014–15

The 2013–14 Liga Națională was the 56th season of Romanian Women's Handball League, the top-level women's professional handball league. The league comprises twelve teams. Oltchim Râmnicu Vâlcea were the defending champions, for the seventh season in a row, but the team was dissolved during the summer of 2013.

HCM Baia Mare won the title.

== Teams for 2013–14 ==
Location of teams in the Romanian Women's Handball League
- CSM București
- HCM Baia Mare
- Corona Braşov
- SCM Craiova
- Dunărea Brăila
- HCM Râmnicu Vâlcea
- Cetate Deva
- CSM Ploieşti
- HCM Roman
- Universitatea Cluj-Napoca
- HC Zalău
- Neptun Constanţa

== Standings ==
Pos	Team	Pld	W	D	L	GF	GD	Pts	Qualification or relegation
1	HCM Baia Mare	22	21	0	1	622	472	63	Qualification Play-off
2	ASC Corona 2010 Brașov	22	17	1	4	627	531	52	Qualification Play-off
3	HCM Roman	22	14	1	7	522	490	43	Qualification Play-off
4	HC Dunărea Brăila	22	13	2	7	519	486	41	Qualification Play-off
5	Universitatea Jolidon Cluj-Napoca	22	12	0	10	626	597	36	Qualification Play-off
6	HC Zalău	22	11	1	10	503	503	34	Qualification Play-off
7	CSM București	22	11	1	10	531	538	33 *	Qualification Play-out
8	CSM Cetate Devatrans Deva	22	8	3	11	556	552	27	Qualification Play-out
9	CSU Neptun Constanţa	22	6	2	14	511	581	20	Qualification Play-out
10	SCM Craiova	22	6	3	13	489	537	19 **	Qualification Play-out
11	CSM Ploieşti	22	4	1	17	507	624	13	Qualification Play-out
12	HCM Râmnicu Vâlcea	22	0	3	19	514	616	3	Qualification Play-out

1. * CSM București was docked 1 point.

2. ** SCM Craiova was docked 2 points.

== Play-off ==
Team 1	Team 2	Round 1	Round 2	Round 3
HCM Baia Mare	HC Zalău	33–23	28–21	
Corona Brașov	Universitatea Jolidon Cluj-Napoca	29–28	34–26	
HCM Roman	HC Dunărea Brăila	23–26	18–18	

== Play-out ==
Team 1	Team 2	Round 1	Round 2	Round 3
CSM București	HCM Râmnicu Vâlcea	26–20	29–22	
Cetate Deva	CSM Ploieşti	27–32	31–29	25–21
CSU Neptun Constanţa	SCM Craiova	18–23	20–23	

== League table – positions 1–3 ==
Pos	Team	Pld	W	D	L	GF	GD	Pts	Qualification or relegation
1	HCM Baia Mare (C)	4	4	0	0	141	113	12	2014–15 EHF Women's Champions League
2	ASC Corona 2010 Brașov	4	2	0	2	127	119	6	2014–15 Women's EHF Cup
3	HC Dunărea Brăila	4	0	0	4	96	132	0	2014–15 Women's EHF Cup

== League table – positions 4–6 ==
Pos	Team	Pld	W	D	L	GF	GD	Pts	Qualification or relegation
4	Universitatea Jolidon Cluj-Napoca	4	3	0	1	103	102	9	2014–15 Women's EHF Cup Winners' Cup
5	HCM Roman	4	2	0	2	108	107	6	2014–15 Women's EHF Cup Winners' Cup
6	HC Zalău	4	1	0	3	104	108	3	

== League table – positions 7–9 ==
Pos	Team	Pld	W	D	L	GF	GD	Pts	Qualification or relegation
7	CSM București	4	3	0	1	119	92	9	
8	SCM Craiova	4	2	0	2	98	102	6	
9	CSM Cetate Devatrans Deva	4	1	0	3	82	105	3	

== League table – positions 10–12 ==
Pos	Team	Pld	W	D	L	GF	GD	Pts	Qualification or relegation
10	HCM Râmnicu Vâlcea	4	3	0	1	99	89	9	
11	CSU Neptun Constanţa	4	2	1	1	94	84	7	Relegation play-off winner
12	CSM Ploieşti	4	0	1	3	90	110	1	Relegation play-off winner

== Top goalscorers ==
Pos	Player	Team	Goals
1	(Romania) Janina Luca	HCM Râmnicu Vâlcea	158
2	(Romania) Florentina Cartaș	CSM Cetate Devatrans Deva	155
2	(Romania) Daniela Băbeanu	HCM Roman	151
