= 2016–17 Liga Națională (women's handball) =

Romanian women's handball league season

2015–16 Liga Națională
- Season champions: CSM București
- Runners-up: Dunărea Brăila

Seasons
- ← 2015–16 2017–18 →

The 2016–17 Liga Națională was the 59th season of Liga Națională, the top-level women's professional handball league. The league comprises 12 teams. CSM București were the defending champions, for the second season in a row.

== Teams for season 2016–17 ==
Location of teams in the Romanian Women's Handball League

Club	City	Arena(s)	Capacity
CSM Bistrița	Bistrița	Sala Polivalentă Bistrița	900
CSM București	Bucharest	Sala Polivalentă din București	5,300
Corona Brașov	Brașov	Sala Sporturilor "D.P. Colibași"	1,600
CSM Roman	Roman	Sala Polivalentă Roman	500
Danubius Galați	Galați	Sala Sporturilor Dunărea	1,500
Dunărea Brăila	Brăila	Sala Polivalentă "Danubius"	2,000
HC Zalău	Zalău	Sala Sporturilor Zalău	950
HCM Râmnicu Vâlcea	Râmnicu Vâlcea	Sala Sporturilor "Traian"	3,126
Măgura Cisnădie	Cisnădie	Sala Polivalentă Măgura	820
SCM Craiova	Craiova	Sala Polivalentă Craiova	4,215
Unirea Slobozia	Slobozia	Sala Sporturilor "Andreea Nica"	150
Universitatea Cluj	Cluj-Napoca	Sala Sporturilor "Horia Demian"; Sala Polivalentă Cluj	2,525; 7,308

== League table ==
=== Standings ===
	Team	Pld	W	D	L	GF	GA	Diff	Pts
1	CSM București (C)	22	21	0	1	680	478	+ 202	63
2	Dunărea Brăila	22	15	12	5	566	541	+ 25	47
3	HC Zalău	22	14	3	5	575	511	+ 64	45
4	SCM Craiova	22	14	2	6	593	527	+ 66	44
5	CSM Roman	22	10	4	8	563	527	+ 36	34
6	Corona Brașov	22	9	1	12	568	594	26	28
7	HCM Râmnicu Vâlcea	22	9	1	12	534	598	– 64	28
8	CSM Bistrița	22	9	0	13	588	625	37	27
9	Măgura Cisnădie	22	6	4	12	505	576	– 71	22
10	U Cluj	22	6	3	13	549	564	15	21
11	Danubius Galați^{1}	22	5	0	17	469	567	– 98	14
12	Unirea Slobozia	22	3	2	17	517	599	– 82	11

Pld – Played; W – Won; D – Drawn; L – Lost; GF – Goals for; GA – Goals against; Diff – Difference; Pts – Points.
^{1} Danubius Galați had 1 point deducted .

== Season statistics ==
=== Number of teams by counties ===
Pos.	County	No. of teams	Teams
1	Bistrița-Năsăud	1	CSM Bistrița
1	Brașov	1	ASC Corona 2010 Brașov
1	Bucharest (capital)	1	CSM București
1	Brăila	1	HC Dunărea Brăila
1	Cluj	1	U Cluj
1	Dolj	1	SCM Craiova
1	Galați	1	CSU Danubius Galați
1	Ialomița	1	CSM Unirea Slobozia
1	Neamț	1	CSM Roman
1	Sălaj	1	HC Zalău
1	Sibiu	1	CS Măgura Cisnădie
1	Vâlcea	1	HCM Râmnicu Vâlcea
