= Liga Națională (women's handball) =

Romanian women's handball league

- Founded: 1958; 68 years ago (Handball 11s, 1946)
- First season: 1958–59
- No. of teams: 12
- Country: Romania
- Confederation: EHF
- Most recent champion: Gloria Bistrița (2025–26)
- Most titles: SCM Râmnicu Vâlcea (20 titles)
- Broadcaster: Pro Arena
- Level on pyramid: 1
- Relegation to: Divizia A
- International cups: Champions League; EHF European League
- Website: frh.ro
- 2025–26 Liga Națională

The Liga Națională is a league of professional women's handball league teams in Romania. Run by the Romanian Handball Federation, the competition is also known as the Liga Florilor MOL and is contested by sixteen teams.

The National Handball League is Romania's top-level domestic women's handball-league club competition. The team with the most Liga Națională championships is SCM Râmnicu Vâlcea with twenty.

The FRH organization also oversees the Divizia A.

The European Handball Federation (EHF) ranks the Liga Națională 3rd in the coefficients of leagues based on performances in European competitions over the past seasons.

== Current teams ==
=== Teams for season 2025–26 ===
Location of teams in 2025–26 Liga Națională
- Minaur Baia Mare
- Gloria Bistrița
- Corona Brașov
- Dunărea Brăila
- CSM București
- Rapid București
- SCM Craiova
- CSM Galați
- SCM Râmnicu Vâlcea
- CSM Slatina
- CSM Târgu Jiu
- HC Zalău

== Awards ==
The Simona Arghir-Sandu Trophy is awarded annually to the leading goal scorer in the Liga Națională (LNHF). It is named in honour of right back Simona Arghir-Sandu.

== List of champions ==
=== 1946–1963 (11 players) ===
Season	Winning coach	(gold) Gold	(silver) Silver	(bronze) Bronze
1946	Bruno Holzträger	Karres Mediaş	SG Sighișoara	
1947	Bruno Holzträger	Derubau Mediaş	Voinţa Sighișoara	
1948		IRTI Mediaş	Voinţa Mediaş	Avântul Agnita
1949	Bruno Holzträger	Record Mediaş	CFR Sighișoara	CSU București
1950	Wilhelm Lapka	Flamura Roşie Mediaş	CSU București	Flamura Roşie ILSA Timişoara
1951	Bruno Holzträger	Flamura Roşie Mediaş	Spartak Sighișoara	Știința ICF București
1952	Ioan Kunst-Ghermănescu	Știința ICF București	Spartak Sighișoara	Știința Timișoara
1953	Walter Meither	Știința Timișoara	Știința ICF București	Progresul Învățământ București
1954	Árpád Kameniczki	Progresul Târgu Mureș	Progresul Brașov	Știința Timișoara
1955	Árpád Kameniczki	Progresul Târgu Mureș	Știința ICF București	Progresul Brașov
1956	Dumitru Popescu-Colibași	Progresul Brașov	Flamura Roşie București	Flamura Roşie Sibiu
1957	Constantin Popescu-Pilică	Steagul Roşu București	Progresul MIC București	Progresul Brașov
1957–58	Constantin Popescu-Pilică	Steagul Roşu București	Olimpia București	Flamura Roşie Sibiu
1958–59	Gabriel Zugrăvescu	Olimpia București	Progresul București	Mureșul Târgu Mureș
1959–60	Valeriu Gogâltan	Știința București	Rapid București	Știința Timișoara
1960–61	Gabriel Zugrăvescu	Rapid București	Progresul București	Mureșul Târgu Mureș
1961–62	Constantin Popescu-Pilică	Progresul București	Minerul Vulcan	CSȘ Cluj-Napoca
1962–63	Ioan Bota	Știința București	Rapid București	Progresul București

=== 1958–present (7 players) ===
Season	Winning coach	(gold) Gold	(silver) Silver	(bronze) Bronze
1958–59	Constantin Popescu (1)	Progresul București (1)	Olimpia București (1)	Tractorul Brașov (1)
1959–60	Gabriel Zugrăvescu (1)	Știința București (1)	Rapid București (1)	Știința Timișoara (1)
1960–61	Gabriel Zugrăvescu (2)	Rapid București (1)	Știința Timișoara (1)	Știința București (1)
1961–62	Gabriel Zugrăvescu (3)	Rapid București (2)	Știința București (1)	Tractorul Brașov (2)
1962–63	Gabriel Zugrăvescu (4)	Rapid București (3)	Știința Timișoara (2)	CSM Sibiu (1)
1963–64	Victor Chița (1)	Știința Timișoara (1)	Rapid București (2)	Știința București (2)
1964–65	Constantin Popescu (2)	Știința București (2)	Știința Timișoara (3)	Rapid București (1)
1965–66	Victor Chița (2)	Universitatea Știința Timișoara (2)	Rapid București (3)	Mureșul Târgu Mureș (1)
1966–67	Francisc Spier (1)	Rapid București (4)	Universitatea Timișoara (4)	Universitatea București (3)
1967–68	Constantin Lache (1)	Universitatea Timișoara (3)	Universitatea București (2)	Rapid București (2)
1968–69	Constantin Lache (2)	Universitatea Timișoara (4)	Rapid București (4)	Confecția București (1)
1969–70	Constantin Lache (3)	Universitatea Timișoara (5)	Universitatea București (3)	Confecția București (2)
1970–71	Constantin Popescu (3)	Universitatea București (3)	Universitatea Timișoara (5)	IEFS București (1)
1971–72	Constantin Lache (4)	Universitatea Timișoara (6)	Universitatea București (4)	IEFS București (2)
1972–73	Ioan Bota (1)	IEFS București (1)	Universitatea Timișoara (6)	Universitatea București (4)
1973–74	Ioan Bota (2)	IEFS București (2)	Universitatea Timișoara (7)	Textila Buhuși (1)
1974–75	Constantin Lache (5)	Universitatea Timișoara (7)	Universitatea București (5)	Progresul București (1)
1975–76	Constantin Lache (6)	Universitatea Timișoara (8)	Progresul București (1)	Voința Odorhei (1)
1976–77	Constantin Lache (7)	Universitatea Timișoara (9)	IEFS București (1)	Universitatea București (5)
1977–78	Constantin Lache (8)	Universitatea Timișoara (10)	Hidrotehnica Constanța (1)	Confecția București (3)
1978–79	Eugen Bartha (1)	Stiința Bacău (1)	Constructorul Baia Mare (1)	Hidrotehnica Constanța (1)
1979–80	Eugen Bartha (2)	Stiința Bacău (2)	Mureșul Târgu Mureș (1)	Constructorul Baia Mare (1)
1980–81	Remus Drăgănescu (1)	Rulmentul Brașov (1)	Stiința Bacău (1)	Mureșul Târgu Mureș (2)
1981–82	Eugen Bartha (3)	Stiința Bacău (3)	Progresul București (2)	Universitatea Timișoara (2)
1982–83	Eugen Bartha (4)	Stiința Bacău (4)	Chimistul Râmnicu Vâlcea (1)	Rulmentul Brașov (1)
1983–84	Eugen Bartha (5)	Stiința Bacău (5)	Rulmentul Brașov (1)	Chimistul Râmnicu Vâlcea (1)
1984–85	Eugen Bartha (6)	Stiința Bacău (6)	Chimistul Râmnicu Vâlcea (2)	Hidrotehnica Constanța (2)
1985–86	Alexandru Mengoni (1)	Stiința Bacău (7)	Rulmentul Brașov (2)	Chimistul Râmnicu Vâlcea (2)
1986–87	Alexandru Mengoni (2)	Stiința Bacău (8)	Mureșul Târgu Mureș (2)	Rulmentul Brașov (2)
1987–88	Gheorghe Ionescu (1)	Mureșul Târgu Mureș (1)	Stiința Bacău (2)	Chimistul Râmnicu Vâlcea (3)
1988–89	Ioan Gherhard (1)	Chimistul Râmnicu Vâlcea (1)	Mureșul Târgu Mureș (3)	Stiința Bacău (1)
1989–90	Gheorghe Ionescu (2)	Chimistul Râmnicu Vâlcea (2)	Stiința Bacău (3)	Textila Zalău (1)
1990–91	Gheorghe Ionescu (3)	Chimistul Râmnicu Vâlcea (3)	Stiința Bacău (4)	Textila Zalău (2)
1991–92	Alexandru Mengoni (3)	Stiința Bacău (9)	Chimistul Râmnicu Vâlcea (3)	Rapid București (3)
1992–93	Lucian Râșniță (1)	Chimistul Râmnicu Vâlcea (4)	Rapid București (5)	HC Aura Iași (1)
1993–94	Constantin Cojocaru (1)	Chimistul Râmnicu Vâlcea (5)	Silcotub Zalău (1)	Rapid București (4)
1994–95	Constantin Cojocaru (2)	Oltchim Râmnicu Vâlcea (6)	Rapid București (6)	Silcotub Zalău (3)
1995–96	Constantin Cojocaru (3)	Oltchim Râmnicu Vâlcea (7)	Silcotub Zalău (2)	Sidex Galați (1)
1996–97	Alexandru Mengoni (4)	Oltchim Râmnicu Vâlcea (8)	Silcotub Zalău (3)	Sidex Galați (2)
1997–98	Lucian Râșniță (2)	Oltchim Râmnicu Vâlcea (9)	Silcotub Zalău (4)	Universitatea Ursus Cluj-Napoca (1)
1998–99	Bogdan Macovei (1)	Oltchim Râmnicu Vâlcea (10)	Silcotub Zalău (5)	Rapid București (5)
1999–00	Bogdan Macovei (2)	Oltchim Râmnicu Vâlcea (11)	Silcotub Zalău (6)	Rapid București (6)
2000–01	Gheorghe Tadici (1)	Silcotub Zalău (1)	Oltchim Râmnicu Vâlcea (4)	Fibrex Săvinești (1)
2001–02	Mariana Tîrcă (1)	Oltchim Râmnicu Vâlcea (12)	Silcotub Zalău (7)	Universitatea Remin Deva (1)
2002–03	Vasile Mărgulescu (1)	Rapid București (5)	Oltchim Râmnicu Vâlcea (5)	Universitatea Remin Deva (2)
2003–04	Gheorghe Tadici (2)	Silcotub Zalău (2)	Universitatea Remin Deva (1)	Rapid București (7)
2004–05	Gheorghe Tadici (3)	Silcotub Zalău (3)	Rapid București (7)	Oltchim Râmnicu Vâlcea (4)
2005–06	Mariana Tîrcă (2)	Rulmentul Brașov (2)	Silcotub Zalău (8)	Oltchim Râmnicu Vâlcea (5)
2006–07	Gheorghe Tadici (4)	Oltchim Râmnicu Vâlcea (13)	Rulmentul Brașov (3)	Universitatea Jolidon Cluj-Napoca (2)
2007–08	Gheorghe Tadici (5)	Oltchim Râmnicu Vâlcea (14)	Rulmentul Brașov (4)	Oțelul Galați (2)
2008–09	Radu Voina (1)	Oltchim Râmnicu Vâlcea (15)	Rulmentul Brașov (5)	Dunărea Brăila (1)
2009–10	Radu Voina (2)	Oltchim Râmnicu Vâlcea (16)	Universitatea Jolidon Cluj-Napoca (1)	Tomis Constanța (1)
2010–11	Péter Kovács (1)	Oltchim Râmnicu Vâlcea (17)	Universitatea Jolidon Cluj-Napoca (2)	CSM București (1)
2011–12	Radu Voina (3)	Oltchim Râmnicu Vâlcea (18)	Universitatea Jolidon Cluj-Napoca (3)	HCM Zalău (4)
2012–13	Jakob Vestergaard (1)	Oltchim Râmnicu Vâlcea (19)	HCM Baia Mare (2)	Universitatea Jolidon Cluj-Napoca (3)
2013–14	Costică Buceschi (1)	HCM Baia Mare (1)	Corona Brașov (6)	Dunărea Brăila (2)
2014–15	Mette Klit (1)	CSM București (1)	HCM Baia Mare (3)	Corona Brașov (3)
2015–16	Kim Rasmussen (1)	CSM București (2)	HCM Baia Mare (4)	Corona Brașov (4)
2016–17	Per Johansson (1)	CSM București (3)	Dunărea Brăila (1)	HC Zalău (5)
2017–18	Per Johansson (2)	CSM București (4)	SCM Craiova (1)	Măgura Cisnădie (1)
2018–19	Florentin Pera (1)	SCM Râmnicu Vâlcea (20)	CSM București (1)	Gloria Bistrița (1)
2019–20	Abandoned due to the COVID-19 pandemic			
2020–21	Adrian Vasile (1)	CSM București (5)	HCM Baia Mare (5)	SCM Râmnicu Vâlcea (6)
2021–22	Carlos Viver (1)	Rapid București (6)	CSM București (2)	SCM Râmnicu Vâlcea (7)
2022–23	Adrian Vasile (2)	CSM București (6)	Rapid București (6)	Gloria Bistrița (2)
2023–24	Adrian Vasile (3)	CSM București (7)	Rapid București (7)	Gloria Bistrița (3)
2024–25	Helle Thomsen (1)	CSM București (8)	Corona Brașov (1)	Gloria Bistrița (4)
2025–26	Carlos Viver (2)	Gloria Bistrița (1)	CSM București (3)	Corona Brașov (5)

== Results by teams ==
=== 7 players ===
1958–present
Teams	Winners	Winning seasons
SCM Râmnicu Vâlcea	20	1988–89, 1989–90, 1990–91, 1992–93, 1993–94, 1994–95, 1995–96, 1996–97, 1997–98, 1998–99, 1999–00, 2001–02, 2006–07, 2007–08, 2008–09, 2009–10, 2010–11, 2011–12, 2012–13, 2018–19
Universitatea Timișoara	10	1963–64, 1965–66, 1967–68, 1968–69, 1969–70, 1971–72, 1974–75, 1975–76, 1976–77, 1977–78
Știința Bacău	9	1978–79, 1979–80, 1981–82, 1982–83, 1983–84, 1984–85, 1985–86, 1986–87, 1991–92
CSM București	8	2014–15, 2015–16, 2016–17, 2017–18, 2020–21, 2022–23, 2023–24, 2024–25
Rapid București	6	1960–61, 1961–62, 1962–63, 1966–67, 2002–03, 2021–22
HC Zalău	3	2000–01, 2003–04, 2004–05
Universitatea București	3	1959–60, 1964–65, 1970–71
Corona Brașov	2	1980–81, 2005–06
IEFS București	2	1972–73, 1973–74
Gloria Bistrița	1	2025–26
Minaur Baia Mare	1	2013–14
Mureșul Târgu Mureș	1	1987–88
Progresul București	1	1958–59

=== 11 players ===
1946–1963
Teams	Winners	Winning seasons
Flamura Roşie Mediaş	6	1946, 1947, 1948, 1949, 1950, 1951
Știința București	3	1952, 1960, 1963
Progresul Târgu Mureș	2	1959, 1955
Steagul Roșu București	2	1957, 1958
Progresul București	1	1962
Rapid București	1	1961
Olimpia București	1	1959
Progresul Brașov	1	1956
Știința Timișoara	1	1953

== EHF league coefficients ==
=== EHF league ranking ===
EHF League Ranking for 2022/23 season:

- 1. (1) (Hungary) Nemzeti Bajnokság I (157.67)
- 2. (5) (France) Ligue Butagaz Énergie (118.50)
- 3. (2) (Russia) Russian Superleague (114.50)
- 4. (3) (Denmark) Bambusa Kvindeligaen (109.00)
- 5. (6) (Norway) REMA 1000-ligaen (102.77)
- 6. (4) (Romania) Liga Națională (94.50)

== Notable foreign players ==
Angola

- (Angola) Azenaide Carlos
- (Angola) Albertina Kassoma
- (Angola) Liliana Venâncio
- (Angola) Magda Cazanga
- (Angola) Ruth João
- (Angola) Wuta Dombaxe
- (Angola) Natália Kamalandua

Belarus

- (Belarus) Natallia Vasileuskaya
- (Belarus) Dziyana Ilyina
- (Belarus) Maria Kanaval
- (Belarus) Anastasia Lobach

Brazil

- (Brazil) Eduarda Amorim
- (Brazil) Alexandra do Nascimento
- (Brazil) Bárbara Arenhart
- (Brazil) Ana Paula Rodrigues-Belo
- (Brazil) Mayssa Pessoa
- (Brazil) Deonise Cavaleiro-Fachinello
- (Brazil) Fernanda da Silva
- (Brazil) Samara da Silva
- (Brazil) Larissa Araújo
- (Brazil) Mariana Costa
- (Brazil) Jéssica Quintino
- (Brazil) Francielle da Rocha
- (Brazil) Elaine Gomes
- (Brazil) Karoline de Souza
- (Brazil) Giulia Guarieiro
- (Brazil) Renata Arruda

Bulgaria

- (Bulgaria) Ekaterina Dzhukeva

Czech Republic

- (Czech Republic) Helena Ryšánková
- (Czech Republic) Charlotte Cholevova

Croatia

- (Croatia) Jelena Grubišić
- (Croatia) Sanela Knezović
- (Croatia) Lidija Horvat
- (Croatia) Katarina Ježić
- (Croatia) Valentina Blažević
- (Croatia) Ivana Kapitanović
- (Croatia) Kristina Prkačin
- (Croatia) Katarina Pavlović
- (Croatia) Dejana Milosavljević

Denmark

- (Denmark) Maria Stokholm
- (Denmark) Line Jørgensen
- (Denmark) Trine Østergaard
- (Denmark) Simone Böhme
- (Denmark) Ann Grete Nørgaard
- (Denmark) Ida-Marie Dahl
- (Denmark) Mathilde Neesgaard
- (Denmark) Fie Woller
- (Denmark) Trine Østergaard
- (Denmark) Emma Friis
- (Denmark) Anne Mette Hansen

France

- (France) Amandine Leynaud
- (France) Allison Pineau
- (France) Camille Ayglon-Saurina
- (France) Siraba Dembélé-Pavlović
- (France) Grâce Zaadi
- (France) Laura Glauser
- (France) Kalidiatou Niakaté
- (France) Alexandra Lacrabère
- (France) Orlane Kanor
- (France) Gnonsiane Niombla
- (France) Laurisa Landre
- (France) Julie Foggea
- (France) Laura Flippes
- (France) Alicia Toublanc

Germany

- (Germany) Ewgenija Minevskaja
- (Germany) Meike Schmelzer
- (Germany) Mia Zschocke
- (Germany) Julia Maidhof
- (Germany) Isabell Roch

Hungary

- (Hungary) Gabriella Juhász
- (Hungary) Gabriella Szűcs
- (Hungary) Dorina Korsós
- (Hungary) Rita Borbás
- (Hungary) Tamara Pál
- (Hungary) Nikolett Papp
- (Hungary) Asma Elghaoui
- (Hungary) Zsanett Borbély
- (Hungary) Fanni Kenyeres

Japan

- (Japan) Asuka Fujita

Montenegro

- (Montenegro) Katarina Bulatović
- (Montenegro) Jovanka Radičević
- (Montenegro) Majda Mehmedović
- (Montenegro) Marija Jovanović
- (Montenegro) Itana Grbić
- (Montenegro) Andrea Klikovac
- (Montenegro) Dijana Ujkić
- (Montenegro) Bobana Klikovac
- (Montenegro) Ljubica Nenezić
- (Montenegro) Marta Batinović-Žderić
- (Montenegro) Ema Ramusović
- (Montenegro) Dijana Mugoša
- (Montenegro) Nina Bulatović
- (Montenegro) Marina Rajčić

Netherlands

- (Netherlands) Estavana Polman
- (Netherlands) Tess Wester
- (Netherlands) Martine Smeets
- (Netherlands) Yvette Broch
- (Netherlands) Lois Abbingh

North Macedonia

- (North Macedonia) Marija Shteriova
- (North Macedonia) Leonida Gichevska
- (North Macedonia) Elena Livrinikj
- (North Macedonia) Jovana Sazdovska
- (North Macedonia) Elena Gjeorgjievska
- (North Macedonia) Jovana Micevska

Norway

- (Norway) Nora Mørk
- (Norway) Camilla Herrem
- (Norway) Marit Malm Frafjord
- (Norway) Emilie Hegh Arntzen
- (Norway) Malin Aune
- (Norway) Marie Davidsen
- (Norway) Amanda Kurtović
- (Norway) Maren Nyland Aardahl
- (Norway) Hege Løken
- (Norway) Ane Eidem
- (Norway) Vilde Ingstad
- (Norway) Anniken Wollik
- (Norway) Kristina Novak
- (Norway) Tuva Høve
- (Norway) Karoline Lund
- (Norway) Line Ellertsen
- (Norway) Mina Hesselberg

Poland

- (Poland) Aleksandra Zych
- (Poland) Sylwia Lisewska
- (Poland) Monika Kobylińska
- (Poland) Natalia Nosek
- (Poland) Emilia Galińska

Russia

- (Russia) Emiliya Turey
- (Russia) Yulia Managarova
- (Russia) Kseniya Makeyeva
- (Russia) Ekaterina Gaiduk
- (Russia) Ekaterina Vetkova
- (Russia) Regina Kalinichenko
- (Russia) Ekaterina Matlashova
- (Russia) Yulia Khavronina
- (Russia) Olga Gorshenina
- (Russia) Elena Utkina
- (Russia) Marina Sudakova
- (Russia) Kira Trusova

Senegal

- (Senegal) Hawa N'Diaye
- (Senegal) Fanta Keïta

Serbia

- (Serbia) Andrea Lekić
- (Serbia) Dragana Cvijić
- (Serbia) Kristina Liščević
- (Serbia) Željka Nikolić
- (Serbia) Jelena Trifunović
- (Serbia) Jelena Lavko
- (Serbia) Marina Dmitrović
- (Serbia) Jovana Kovačević
- (Serbia) Dijana Radojević
- (Serbia) Katarina Krpež Šlezak
- (Serbia) Aleksandra Vukajlović
- (Serbia) Jovana Risović
- (Serbia) Sanja Vujović

Slovenia

- (Slovenia) Elizabeth Omoregie
- (Slovenia) Barbara Lazović
- (Slovenia) Amra Pandžić
- (Slovenia) Nataša Ljepoja

South Korea

- (South Korea) Woo Sun-hee
- (South Korea) Chung Eun-hee

Spain

- (Spain) Carmen Martín
- (Spain) Alexandrina Cabral
- (Spain) Silvia Navarro
- (Spain) Marta López
- (Spain) Alicia Fernández
- (Spain) Mireya González
- (Spain) Darly Zogbi de Paula
- (Spain) Almudena Rodríguez
- (Spain) Ainhoa Hernández
- (Spain) Jennifer Gutiérrez Bermejo
- (Spain) Irene Espínola
- (Spain) Alba Spugnini
- (Spain) Lara González Ortega
- (Spain) Darly de Paula

Sweden

- (Sweden) Isabelle Gulldén
- (Sweden) Linnea Torstenson
- (Sweden) Nathalie Hagman
- (Sweden) Sabina Jacobsen
- (Sweden) Linn Blohm
- (Sweden) Filippa Idéhn
- (Sweden) Mikaela Mässing
- (Sweden) Evelina Eriksson
- (Sweden) Daniela de Jong
- (Sweden) Elin Hansson
- (Sweden) Amelia Lundbäck

Ukraine

- (Ukraine) Anastasiia Pidpalova
- (Ukraine) Iryna Glibko
- (Ukraine) Iaroslava Burlachenko
- (Ukraine) Nataliya Savchyn
- (Ukraine) Iryna Shutska
- (Ukraine) Viktoriya Tymoshenkova
- (Ukraine) Tamara Smbatian

Tunisia

- (Tunisia) Mouna Jlezi
- (Tunisia) Aya Ben Abdallah

Turkey

- (Turkey) Yeliz Özel
- (Turkey) Aslı İskit

== Notable foreign coaches ==
- (Denmark) Anja Andersen
- (Denmark) Mette Klit
- (Denmark) Kim Rasmussen
- (Denmark) Helle Thomsen
- (Denmark) Jakob Vestergaard
- (Sweden) Magnus Johansson
- (Sweden) Per Johansson
- (Sweden) Tomas Ryde
- (Germany) Herbert Müller
- (Hungary) Péter Kovács
- (Spain) Carlos Viver
- (Norway) Bent Dahl

=== Rivalries in Romanian women's handball ===
==== CSM București vs Rapid București rivalry ====
The rivalry between CSM București and CS Rapid București is one of the main Bucharest derbies in Romanian women's handball. The two clubs have met in domestic competitions, including the Liga Națională, Cupa României and Supercupa României, as well as in the EHF Champions League Women. The rivalry gained European importance in the 2024–25 Women's EHF Champions League, when CSM București and CS Rapid București met in the play-offs. CSM București won both legs and advanced 62–46 on aggregate.

Season	Competition	Date	Home team	Score	Away team	Venue	City	Winner	Ref.
2015–16	Liga Națională	To be confirmed	CS Rapid București	18–36	CSM București		Bucharest	CSM București	
2020–21	Cupa României	28 August 2021	CS Rapid București	25–31	CSM București	Sala Polivalentă	Brăila	CSM București	
2021–22	Supercupa României	23 August 2022	CS Rapid București	26–28	CSM București			CSM București	
2022–23	Liga Florilor	28 August 2022	CS Rapid București	31–31	CSM București	Sala Rapid	Bucharest	Draw	
2022–23	Liga Florilor	To be confirmed	CSM București	27–26	CS Rapid București	Sala Polivalentă	Bucharest	CSM București	
2022–23	Cupa României	20 February 2023	CSM București	31–24	CS Rapid București	Sala Polivalentă	Bucharest	CSM București	
2023–24	Supercupa României	27 August 2023	CSM București	31–22	CS Rapid București	Pitești Arena	Pitești	CSM București	
2023–24	Liga Florilor	13 September 2023	CSM București	25–21	CS Rapid București	Sala Polivalentă	Bucharest	CSM București	
2023–24	Liga Florilor	7 February 2024	CS Rapid București	30–28	CSM București	Sala Rapid	Bucharest	CS Rapid București	
2023–24	Cupa României	20 April 2024	CSM București	27–23	CS Rapid București	Sala Polivalentă Danubius	Brăila	CSM București	
2024–25	Liga Florilor	16 October 2024	CSM București	29–24	CS Rapid București	Sala Polivalentă	Bucharest	CSM București	
2024–25	EHF Champions League Women	22 March 2025	CS Rapid București	24–34	CSM București	Sala Rapid	Bucharest	CSM București	
2024–25	Liga Florilor	26 March 2025	CS Rapid București	25–26	CSM București	Sala Rapid	Bucharest	CSM București	
2024–25	EHF Champions League Women	29 March 2025	CSM București	28–22	CS Rapid București		Bucharest	CSM București	
2024–25	EHF Champions League Women	Play-offs	CSM București	62–46	CS Rapid București	Aggregate	—	CSM București advanced	
2025–26	Liga Florilor	1 October 2025	CS Rapid București	27–32	CSM București	Sala Rapid	Bucharest	CSM București	
2025–26	Liga Florilor	18 February 2026	CSM București	33–22	CS Rapid București	Sala Apollo	Bucharest	CSM București	

== See also ==
- Romania women's national handball team
- Divizia A (men's handball)
