= Diana Petrescu =

Romanian handball player (born 1990)

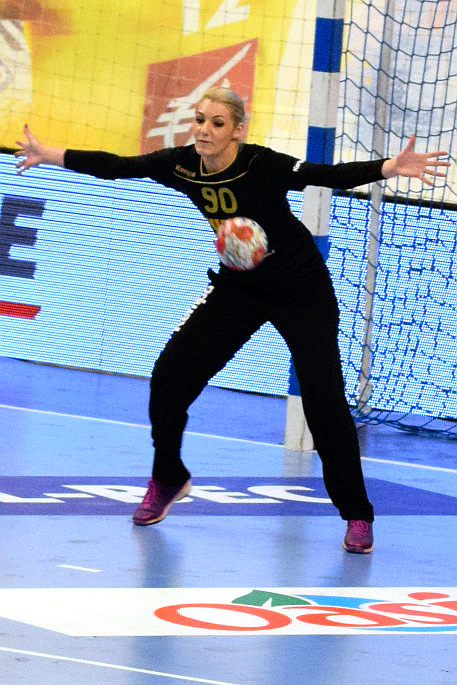

Personal information
- Nationality: Romanian
- Born: 27 March 1990 (age 36) Slatina, Romania
- Height: 1.80 m (5 ft 11 in)

Sport
- Sport: Handball
- Position: Goalkeeper
- Current club: Corona Brașov
- Number: 90

Senior clubs
- Years: Team
- 2010–2015: Neptun Constanța
- 2015–2016: SCM Craiova
- 2016-2017: CSM Slobozia
- 2017-2018: CSM Roman
- 2018-: Corona Brașov
National team
- Years: Team
- 2015: Romania

Diana Mihaela Petrescu-Popescu (born 27 March 1990) is a Romanian handballer who plays as a goalkeeper for Corona Brașov.
