= 2014–15 Women's EHF Cup Winners' Cup =

Women's EHF Cup Winners' Cup
- 2014–15

Tournament information
- Sport: Handball
- Dates: 18 October 2014–10 May 2015

Final positions
- Champions: FC Midtjylland Håndbold

Tournament statistics
- Top scorer: (Spain) Alexandrina Barbosa (63 goals)

The 2014–15 EHF Women's Cup Winners' Cup was the 39th edition of the tournament that is organized by the European Handball Federation for the domestic cup winners in the continent.

== Overview ==
=== Team allocation ===
The labels in the parentheses show how each team qualified for the place of its starting round:

- TH: Title holders
- CW: Cup winners
- CR: Cup runners-up
- 2nd, 3rd, 4th, 5th, 6th, etc.: League position
- ECL: Transferred from the EHF Champions League
  - GS: Fourth-placed teams from the group stage
  - QS: Losers from the qualification tournaments

Last 16
| (Austria) Hypo Niederösterreich (ECL GS) | (Croatia) Podravka Koprivnica (ECL GS) | (Croatia) Lokomotiva Zagreb (ECL GS) | (Poland) SPR Lublin (ECL GS) |
Round 3
| (Hungary) Siófok (CR) | (Russia) Kuban Krasnodar (6th) | (Serbia) ŽORK Jagodina (CW) | (Hungary) Ferencváros (ECL QS) |
| (Denmark) Randers (3rd) | (Romania) Universitatea Cluj (4th) | (Croatia) Umag (3rd) | (Serbia) Radnički Kragujevac (ECL QS) |
| (Denmark) HC Odense (6th) | (Romania) HCM Roman (CR) | (Sweden) Skuru IK (2nd) | (Netherlands) SERCODAK Dalfsen (ECL QS) |
| (Norway) Tertnes HE (3rd) | (Spain) Atlético Guardés (4th) | (North Macedonia) Metalurg Skopje (2nd) | (Denmark) Midtjylland (ECL QS) |
| (Norway) Nordstrand IF (4th) | (Germany) HSG Blomberg-Lippe (CR) | (Poland) Vistal Gdynia (3rd) | |
| (Russia) Zvezda Zvenigorod (CW) | (France) Fleury Loiret (CW) | (Switzerland) LK Zug (1st) | |
Round 2
| (Montenegro) Danilovgrad (2nd) | (Lithuania) Žalgiris Kaunas (1st) | (Belarus) BNTU Minsk (ECL QS) | (Norway) Byåsen HE (ECL QS) |

=== Round and draw dates ===
All draws held at the European Handball Federation headquarters in Vienna, Austria.

| Round | Draw date | First leg | Second leg |
|---|---|---|---|
| Round 2 | 22 July 2014 | 18–19 October 2014 | 25–26 October 2014 |
| Round 3 | 22 July 2014 | 15–16 November 2014 | 22–23 November 2014 |
| Last 16 | 25 November 2014 | 7–8 February 2015 | 14–15 February 2015 |
| Quarter-final | 17 February 2015 | 7–8 March 2015 | 14–15 March 2015 |
| Semi-finals | 17 February 2015 | 4–5 April 2015 | 11–12 April 2015 |
| Finals | 14 April 2015 | 2–3 May 2015 | 9–10 May 2015 |

== Qualification stage ==
=== Round 2 ===
Teams listed first played the first leg at home. Some teams agreed to play both matches in the same venue. Bolded teams qualified into the third round.

| Team 1 | Agg. | Team 2 | 1st leg | 2nd leg |
|---|---|---|---|---|
| **BNTU Minsk** (Belarus) | 60–43 | (Lithuania) Žalgiris Kaunas | 32–20 | 28–23 |
| **Byåsen HE** (Norway) | 61–43^{a} | (Montenegro) Danilovgrad | 34–16 | 27–27 |

Notes
^{a} Both legs were hosted by Danilovgrad.

=== Round 3 ===
Teams listed first played the first leg at home. Some teams agreed to play both matches in the same venue. Bolded teams qualified into last 16.

| Team 1 | Agg. | Team 2 | 1st leg | 2nd leg |
|---|---|---|---|---|
| Kuban Krasnodar (Russia) | 40–65^{a} | (Denmark) **Midtjylland** | 23–34 | 17–31 |
| HC Odense (Denmark) | 54–58 | (Denmark) **Randers** | 28–28 | 26–30 |
| LK Zug (Switzerland) | 51–67^{b} | (Netherlands) **SERCODAK Dalfsen** | 34–35 | 17–32 |
| **Ferencváros** (Hungary) | 75–44 | (Serbia) ŽORK Jagodina | 40–23 | 35–21 |
| **Zvezda Zvenigorod** (Russia) | 56–47^{c} | (Poland) Vistal Gdynia | 32–20 | 24–27 |
| Metalurg Skopje (North Macedonia) | 31–62^{d} | (Hungary) **Siófok** | 17–26 | 14–36 |
| BNTU Minsk (Belarus) | 54–67 | (Germany) **HSG Blomberg-Lippe** | 29–38 | 25–29 |
| Universitatea Cluj (Romania) | 48–53 | (Serbia) **Radnički Kragujevac** | 29–29 | 19–24 |
| **HCM Roman** (Romania) | 54–49^{e} | (Sweden) Skuru IK | 30–30 | 24–19 |
| Nordstrand IF (Norway) | 45–52 | (Norway) **Tertnes HE** | 19–22 | 26–30 |
| **Byåsen HE** (Norway) | 65–56^{f} | (Spain) Atlético Guardés | 30–25 | 35–31 |
| **Fleury Loiret** (France) | 73–35^{g} | (Croatia) Umag | 39–15 | 34–20 |

Notes

^{a} Both legs were hosted by Midtjylland.
^{b} Both legs were hosted by SERCODAK Dalfsen.
^{c} Both legs were hosted by Vistal Gdynia.
^{d} Both legs were hosted by Siófok.

^{e} Both legs were hosted by HCM Roman.
^{f} Both legs were hosted by Atlético Guardés.
^{g} Both legs were hosted by Fleury Loiret.

== Knockout stage ==
Last 16
(Norway) **Byåsen HE** | 39 | 22 | 61
(Serbia) Radnički Kragujevac | 24 | 25 | 49
(Hungary) Siófok | 25 | 22 | 47
(Austria) **Hypo Niederösterreich** | 20 | 30 | 50
(Russia) **Zvezda Zvenigorod** (a) | 24 | 25 | 49
(Croatia) Podravka Koprivnica | 21 | 28 | 49
(Netherlands) SERCODAK Dalfsen | 27 | 22 | 49
(France) **Fleury Loiret** | 29 | 28 | 57
(Hungary) **Ferencváros** | 44 | 41 | 85
(Norway) Tertnes HE | 27 | 26 | 53
(Croatia) Lokomotiva Zagreb | 17 | 20 | 37
(Germany) **HSG Blomberg-Lippe** | 27 | 24 | 51
(Denmark) Randers | 18 | 29 | 47
(Poland) **SPR Lublin** | 27 | 21 | 48
(Romania) HCM Roman | 20 | 21 | 41
(Denmark) **Midtjylland** | 24 | 29 | 53

Quarter-final
(Norway) Byåsen HE | 23 | 20 | 43
(Austria) **Hypo Niederösterreich** | 24 | 28 | 52
(Russia) Zvezda Zvenigorod | 19 | 25 | 44
(France) **Fleury Loiret** | 28 | 25 | 53
(Hungary) **Ferencváros** | 34 | 33 | 67
(Germany) HSG Blomberg-Lippe | 25 | 33 | 58
(Poland) SPR Lublin | 25 | 18 | 43
(Denmark) **Midtjylland** | 35 | 30 | 65

Semi-finals
(Austria) Hypo Niederösterreich | 20 | 22 | 42
(France) **Fleury Loiret** | 32 | 32 | 64
(Hungary) Ferencváros | 23 | 29 | 52
(Denmark) **Midtjylland** | 30 | 31 | 61

Finals
(France) Fleury Loiret | 23 | 19 | 42
(Denmark) **Midtjylland** | 22 | 24 | 46

=== Last 16 ===
==== Seedings ====
| Pot 1 | Pot 2 |
|---|---|
| (Austria) Hypo Niederösterreich (Croatia) Lokomotiva Zagreb (Croatia) Podravka Koprivnica (Denmark) Midtjylland (Hungary) Ferencváros (Netherlands) SERCODAK Dalfsen (Poland) SPR Lublin (Serbia) Radnički Kragujevac | (Denmark) Randers (France) Fleury Loiret (Germany) HSG Blomberg-Lippe (Hungary) Siófok (Norway) Byåsen HE (Norway) Tertnes HE (Romania) HCM Roman (Russia) Zvezda Zvenigorod |

==== Matches ====
Teams listed first played the first leg at home. Some teams agreed to play both matches in the same venue. Bolded teams qualified into quarter finals.

| Team 1 | Agg. | Team 2 | 1st leg | 2nd leg |
|---|---|---|---|---|
| HCM Roman (Romania) | 41–53 | (Denmark) **Midtjylland** | 20–24 | 21–29 |
| Lokomotiva Zagreb (Croatia) | 31–57^{a} | (Germany) **HSG Blomberg-Lippe** | 17–27 | 20–24 |
| **Byåsen HE** (Norway) | 61–49 | (Serbia) Radnički Kragujevac | 39–24 | 22–25 |
| **Ferencváros** (Hungary) | 85–53^{b} | (Norway) Tertnes HE | 44–27 | 41–26 |
| SERCODAK Dalfsen (Netherlands) | 49–57 | (France) **Fleury Loiret** | 27–29 | 22–28 |
| Siófok (Hungary) | 47–50 | (Austria) **Hypo Niederösterreich** | 25–20 | 22–30 |
| Randers (Denmark) | 47–48 | (Poland) **SPR Lublin** | 18–27 | 29–21 |
| **Zvezda Zvenigorod** (Russia) | 49–49^{c} (a) | (Croatia) Podravka Koprivnica | 24–21 | 25–28 |

Notes

^{a} Both legs were hosted by Lokomotiva Zagreb.
^{b} Both legs were hosted by Ferencváros.

^{c} Both legs were hosted by Podravka Koprivnica.

=== Quarter-final ===
Teams listed first played the first leg at home. Some teams agreed to play both matches in the same venue. Bolded teams qualified into semi finals.

| Team 1 | Agg. | Team 2 | 1st leg | 2nd leg |
|---|---|---|---|---|
| SPR Lublin (Poland) | 43–65 | (Denmark) **Midtjylland** | 25–35 | 18–30 |
| Zvezda Zvenigorod (Russia) | 44–53^{a} | (France) **Fleury Loiret** | 19–28 | 25–25 |
| Byåsen HE (Norway) | 43–52 | (Austria) **Hypo Niederösterreich** | 23–24 | 20–28 |
| **Ferencváros** (Hungary) | 67–58 | (Germany) HSG Blomberg-Lippe | 34–25 | 33–33 |

Notes
^{a} Both legs were hosted by Fleury Loiret.

=== Semi-finals ===
Teams listed first played the first leg at home. Some teams agreed to play both matches in the same venue. Bolded teams qualified into the Finals.

| Team 1 | Agg. | Team 2 | 1st leg | 2nd leg |
|---|---|---|---|---|
| Ferencváros (Hungary) | 52–61 | (Denmark) **Midtjylland** | 23–30 | 29–31 |
| Hypo Niederösterreich (Austria) | 42–64 | (France) **Fleury Loiret** | 20–32 | 22–32 |

=== Finals ===
Teams listed first played the first leg at home.

| Team 1 | Agg. | Team 2 | 1st leg | 2nd leg |
|---|---|---|---|---|
| Fleury Loiret (France) | 42–46 | (Denmark) **Midtjylland** | 23–22 | 19–24 |

== See also ==
- 2014–15 Women's EHF Champions League
- 2014–15 Women's EHF Cup
- 2014–15 Women's EHF Challenge Cup
