= Alina Vătu =

Romanian handball player (born 1989)

Personal information
- Full name: Alina Ramona Vătu
- Nationality: Romanian
- Born: 15 October 1989 (age 37) Zalău, Romania
- Height: 1.65 m (5 ft 5 in)

Sport
- Sport: Handball
- Position: Left Wing
- Current club: Dunărea Brăila
- Number: 28

Senior clubs
- Years: Team
- 2006–2013: HC Zalău
- 2013–2016: Dunărea Brăila
- 2016: Măgura Cisnădie
- 2016–: Dunărea Brăila
National team
- Years: Team
- 2018–: Romania

Alina Ramona Vătu (née Czeczi; born 15 October 1989) is a Romanian female handball player who plays for Dunărea Brăila.

== Achievements ==
- Liga Națională:
  - Bronze Medalist: 2012, 2014, 2017
- EHF Cup:
  - Finalist: 2012

== Individual awards ==
- Liga Națională Top Scorer: 2019
