= 2014–15 Women's EHF Cup =

European handball tournament

Women's EHF Cup
- 2014–15

Tournament information
- Sport: Handball
- Dates: 17 October 2014–9 May 2015

Final positions
- Champions: (Denmark) Tvis Holstebro
- Runner-up: (Russia) Rostov-Don

Tournament statistics
- Top scorer: (Sweden) Nathalie Hagman (73 Goals)

The 2014–15 Women's EHF Cup was 34th edition of EHF's third-tier women's handball competition. It started on 17 October 2014. Team Tvis Holstebro won their second title.

== Overview ==
=== Team allocation ===
The labels in the parentheses show how each team qualified for the place of its starting round:

- TH: Title holders
- 2nd, 3rd, 4th, 5th, 6th, etc.: League position

Round 3
(Hungary) Érd NK (3rd)	(Russia) Rostov-Don (3rd)	(Germany) Buxtehuder SV (3rd)	(Sweden) H 65 Höör (4th)
(Hungary) Dunaújvárosi KKA (4th)	(Russia) Astrakhanochka (5th)	(Germany) Bayer Leverkusen (4th)	(North Macedonia) HC Vardar SCJS (3rd)
(Denmark) Esbjerg (4th)	(Romania) Corona Brașov (2nd)	(France) Issy Paris Hand (2nd)	(Poland) Zagłębie Lubin (2nd)
(Denmark) Tvis Holstebro (5th)	(Romania) Dunărea Brăila (3rd)	(Slovenia) RK Zagorje (2nd)	(Netherlands) VOC Amsterdam (2nd)
(Norway) Stabæk (5th)	(Spain) Bera Bera (1st)	(Turkey) Muratpaşa Bld. SK (1st)	(Portugal) AC Alavarium (1st)
(Russia) Lada Togliatti^{TH} (2nd)	(Spain) Remundas (2nd)	(Sweden) Lugi HF (3rd)	
Round 2
(Austria) WAT Atzgersdorf (2nd)	(Greece) Anagennisi Arta (2nd)	(Iceland) ÍBV (1st)	(Israel) Bnei Herzliya (1st)
(Turkey) Yenimahalle BSK (2nd)	(Belarus) HK Gomel (2nd)	(Kosovo) KHF Kastrioti (1st)	(United Kingdom) Olympia HC (1st)
(Czech Republic) DHK Baník Most (1st)	(Switzerland) SPONO Nottwil (2nd)	(Belgium) Fémina Visé (1st)	(Faroe Islands) Kyndil Tórshavn (1st)
(Ukraine) HC Karpaty (1st)	(Switzerland) LC Brühl Handball (3rd)	(Slovakia) IUVENTA Michalovce (1st)	
(Greece) OF Nea Ionia (1st)	(Italy) Jomi Salerno (1st)	(Luxembourg) HB Dudelange (1st)	

=== Round and draw dates ===
All draws held at the European Handball Federation headquarters in Vienna, Austria.

Round	Draw date	First leg	Second leg
Round 2	22 July 2014	18–19 October 2014	25–26 October 2014
Round 3	22 July 2014	15–16 November 2014	22–23 November 2014
Last 16	25 November 2014	7–8 February 2015	14–15 February 2015
Quarter-final	17 February 2015	7–8 March 2015	14–15 March 2015
Semi-finals	17 February 2015	4–5 April 2015	11–12 April 2015
Finals	14 April 2015	2–3 May 2015	9–10 May 2015

== Qualification stage ==
=== Round 2 ===
Teams listed first played the first leg at home. Some teams agreed to play both matches in the same venue. Bolded teams qualified into the third round.

Team 1	Agg.	Team 2	1st leg	2nd leg
WAT Atzgersdorf (Austria)	49–72	(Greece) **OF Nea Ionia**	22–34	27–38
**IUVENTA Michalovce** (Slovakia)	75–34^{a}	(Kosovo) KHF Kastrioti	44–14	31–20
Kyndil Tórshavn (Faroe Islands)	36–42^{b}	(Belgium) **Fémina Visé**	15–22	21–20
**Yenimahalle BSK** (Turkey)	57–47	(Belarus) HC Gomel	33–22	24–25
Olympia HC (United Kingdom)	16–77^{c}	(Ukraine) **Karpaty**	10–39	6–38
**HB Dudelange** (Luxembourg)	37–33^{d}	(Greece) Anagennisi Arta	15–18	22–15
LC Brühl (Switzerland)	46–52	(Czech Republic) **DHK Baník Most**	21–27	25–25
**SPONO Nottwil** (Switzerland)	74–39^{e}	(Israel) Bnei Hertzeliya	34–20	40–19
**PDO Salerno** (Italy)	61–49^{f}	(Iceland) ÍBV	27–24	34–25

Notes

^{a} Both legs were hosted by IUVENTA Michalovce.
^{b} Both legs were hosted by Kyndil Tórshavn.
^{c} Both legs were hosted by Karpaty.

^{d} Both legs were hosted by Anagennisi Arta.
^{e} Both legs were hosted by SPONO Nottwil.
^{f} Both legs were hosted by PDO Salerno.

=== Round 3 ===
Teams listed first played the first leg at home. Some teams agreed to play both matches in the same venue. Bolded teams qualified into last 16.

Team 1	Agg.	Team 2	1st leg	2nd leg
**Érd NK** (Hungary)	65–39^{a}	(Switzerland) SPONO Nottwil	33–18	32–21
**H 65 Höör** (Sweden)	58–55	(Ukraine) Karpaty	30–21	28–34
**Bera Bera** (Spain)	57–39^{b}	(Italy) PDO Salerno	29–19	28–20
**Tvis Holstebro** (Denmark)	95–37^{c}	(Luxembourg) HB Dudelange	45–18	50–19
**Buxtehuder SV** (Germany)	64–49	(Netherlands) VOC Amsterdam	32–25	32–24
**Bayer Leverkusen** (Germany)	58–52	(Poland) Zagłębie Lubin	30–23	28–29
**Dunaújvárosi KKA** (Hungary)	58–35	(North Macedonia) HC Vardar SCJS	28–20	30–15
IUVENTA Michalovce (Slovakia)	55–65	(Romania) **Corona Brașov**	28–31	27–34
OF Nea Ionia (Greece)	50–71	(Russia) **Astrakhanochka**	28–27	22–44
RK Zagorje (Slovenia)	48–68	(Denmark) **Esbjerg**	22–33	26–35
Lugi HF (Sweden)	47–53	(Spain) **Remundas**	24–28	23–25
Fémina Visé (Belgium)	41–62^{d}	(Turkey) **Muratpaşa Bld. SK**	20–37	21–25
**Issy-Paris Hand** (France)	48–46	(Turkey) Yenimahalle BSK	26–23	22–23
**Rostov-Don** (Russia)	48–41	(Czech Republic) DHK Baník Most	26–21	22–20
Alavarium (Portugal)	43–74^{e}	(Romania) **Dunărea Brăila**	21–40	22–34
**Lada Togliatti** (Russia)	69–52^{f}	(Norway) Stabæk	37–29	32–23

Notes

^{a} Both legs were hosted by Érd.
^{b} Both legs were hosted by PDO Salerno.
^{c} Both legs were hosted by HB Dudelange.

^{d} Both legs were hosted by Muratpaşa Bld. SK.
^{e} Both legs were hosted by Dunărea Brăila.
^{f} Both legs were hosted by Lada Togliatti.

== Knockout stage ==
Last 16
(Germany) Bayer Leverkusen	31	29	60
(Germany) **Buxtehuder SV**	29	34	63
(Spain) Bera Bera	30	27	57
(Turkey) **Muratpaşa Bld. SK**	30	29	59
(Denmark) **Tvis Holstebro**	32	32	64
(Russia) Lada Togliatti	29	30	59
(France) **Issy Paris**	30	24	54
(Romania) Dunărea Brăila	26	25	51
(Hungary) **Érd NK**	30	31	61
(Spain) Remundas	22	23	45
(Sweden) H 65 Höör	25	28	53
(Denmark) **Esbjerg**	33	33	66
(Russia) **Rostov-Don**	28	29	57
(Hungary) Dunaújvárosi KKA	19	28	47
(Russia) **Astrakhanochka**	36	22	58
(Romania) Corona Brașov	25	26	51

Quarter-final
(Germany) Buxtehuder SV	31	18	49
(Turkey) **Muratpaşa Bld. SK**	25	28	53
(Denmark) **Tvis Holstebro**	40	20	60
(France) Issy Paris	27	32	59
(Hungary) **Érd NK**	28	29	57
(Denmark) Esbjerg	20	28	48
(Russia) **Rostov-Don**	37	27	64
(Russia) Astrakhanochka	19	16	35

Semi-finals
(Turkey) Muratpaşa Bld. SK	25	24	49
(Denmark) **Tvis Holstebro**	38	29	67
(Hungary) Érd NK	24	28	52
(Russia) **Rostov-Don**	28	32	60

Finals
(Denmark) **Tvis Holstebro**	33	22	55
(Russia) Rostov-Don	20	33	53

=== Last 16 ===
==== Seedings ====
Pot 1	Pot 2
(Denmark) Esbjerg (France) Issy Paris (Germany) Buxtehuder SV (Hungary) Érd NK (Romania) Corona Brașov (Russia) Lada Togliatti (Russia) Rostov-Don (Spain) Bera Bera	(Denmark) Tvis Holstebro (Germany) Bayer Leverkusen (Hungary) Dunaújvárosi KKA (Romania) Dunărea Brăila (Russia) Astrakhanochka (Spain) Remundas (Sweden) H 65 Höör (Turkey) Muratpaşa Bld. SK

==== Matches ====
Teams listed first played the first leg at home. Some teams agreed to play both matches in the same venue. Bolded teams qualified into quarter finals.

Team 1	Agg.	Team 2	1st leg	2nd leg
Bayer Leverkusen (Germany)	60–63	(Germany) **Buxtehuder SV**	31–29	29–34
H 65 Höör (Sweden)	53–66	(Denmark) **Esbjerg**	25–33	28–33
**Rostov-Don** (Russia)	57–47	(Hungary) Dunaújvárosi KKA	28–19	29–28
**Érd NK** (Hungary)	61–45^{a}	(Spain) Remundas	30–22	31–23
**Astrakhanochka** (Russia)	58–51	(Romania) Corona Brașov	36–25	22–26
**Tvis Holstebro** (Denmark)	64–59^{b}	(Russia) Lada Togliatti	32–29	32–30
Bera Bera (Spain)	57–59	(Turkey) **Muratpaşa Bld. SK**	30–30	27–29
**Issy-Paris Hand** (France)	54–51^{c}	(Romania) Dunărea Brăila	30–26	24–25

Notes

^{a} Both legs were hosted by Érd.
^{b} Both legs were hosted by Tvis Holstebro.

^{c} Both legs were hosted by Issy Paris.

=== Quarter-final ===
Teams listed first played the first leg at home. Some teams agreed to play both matches in the same venue. Bolded teams qualified into semi finals.

Team 1	Agg.	Team 2	1st leg	2nd leg
**Érd NK** (Hungary)	57–48	(Denmark) Esbjerg	28–20	29–28
Buxtehuder SV (Germany)	49–53	(Turkey) **Muratpaşa Bld. SK**	31–25	18–28
**Tvis Holstebro** (Denmark)	60–59	(France) Issy-Paris Hand	40–27	20–32
**Rostov-Don** (Russia)	64–35	(Russia) Astrakhanochka	37–19	27–16

=== Semi-finals ===
Teams listed first played the first leg at home. Some teams agreed to play both matches in the same venue. Bolded teams qualified into the Finals.

Team 1	Agg.	Team 2	1st leg	2nd leg
Muratpaşa Bld. SK (Turkey)	49–67	(Denmark) **Tvis Holstebro**	25–38	24–29
Érd NK (Hungary)	52–60	(Russia) **Rostov-Don**	24–28	28–32

=== Finals ===
Teams listed first played the first leg at home.

Team 1	Agg.	Team 2	1st leg	2nd leg
**Tvis Holstebro** (Denmark)	55–53	(Russia) Rostov-Don	33–20	22–33

== See also ==
- 2014–15 Women's EHF Champions League
- 2014–15 Women's EHF Cup Winners' Cup
- 2014–15 Women's EHF Challenge Cup
