= Zugrăvescu =

Surname list

Zugrăvescu is a Romanian surname. Notable people with the surname include:

- Dorel Zugrăvescu (1930–2019), Romanian geophysicist
- Gabriel Zugrăvescu, Romanian handball player, manager, and author
