= Ioan Gherhard =

Romanian handball coach (1942–2026)

Personal information
- Born: 26 February 1942
- Died: 24 May 2026 (aged 84)
- Nationality: Romanian

Ioan Gherhard (also spelled Ioan Gerhard; 26 February 1942 – 24 May 2026) was a Romanian professional handball manager best known for winning the IHF Cup and the IHF Super Cup with Chimistul Râmnicu Vâlcea. Internationally, Gherhard also led men's team Selmont Baia Mare to the final in the 2002–03 Challenge Cup. He was nicknamed Geri. Gherhard died on 24 May 2026, at the age of 84.

== Trophies ==
=== Women's ===
Chimistul Râmnicu Vâlcea

- Liga Națională:
  - Winner: 1989
- IHF Cup:
  - Winner: 1989
- IHF Super Cup:
  - Winner: 1984

=== Men's ===
Minaur Baia Mare

- Liga Națională:
  - Winner: 1998
