= CS Universitatea Știința București =

Romanian women's handball team

- Full name: Clubul Sportiv Universitatea Știința București
- Short name: Știința București
- Founded: 1949; 76 years ago 2010; 15 years ago
- Arena: Sala Iris
- League: Divizia A
- Club colours
Home	Away

CS Universitatea Știința București, commonly known as Știința București, is a women's handball team based in Bucharest, Romania, that competes in the Divizia A. In 1961, they became the first team to win the European Champions Cup.

Location of Știinta București

== Kits ==
HOME
2016–18	2018-19

AWAY
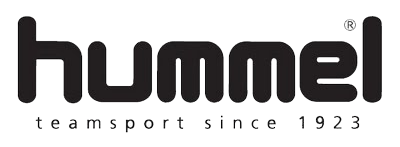
2018-20

== Honours ==
=== Domestic competitions ===
- Liga Națională
  - Winners: 1960, 1965, 1971
  - Second place: 1962, 1968, 1969, 1970, 1972
  - Third place: 1961, 1964, 1967, 1973

=== European competitions ===
- European Champions Cup:
  - Winners: 1961
  - Third place: 1962, 1972

== Former players ==
- (Romania) Irina Klimovschi
- (Romania) Iozefina Ștefănescu
- (Romania) Aurelia Szőke-Tudor
- (Romania) Aurora Leonte
- (Romania) Carolina Cârligeanu
- (Romania) Cornelia Constantinescu
- (Romania) Elisabeta Ionescu
- (Romania) Simona Arghir-Sandu
- (Romania) Doina Furcoi
- (Romania) Lucreția Anca Moise

== Former coaches ==
- (Romania) Constantin Popescu Pilică
- (Romania) Gabriel Zugrăvescu
- (Romania) Elena Jianu
- (Romania) Ion Bota

== See also ==
- CSM București
- Rapid București
