= Constantin Popescu (handball coach) =

Romanian handball coach and author (1928–2018)

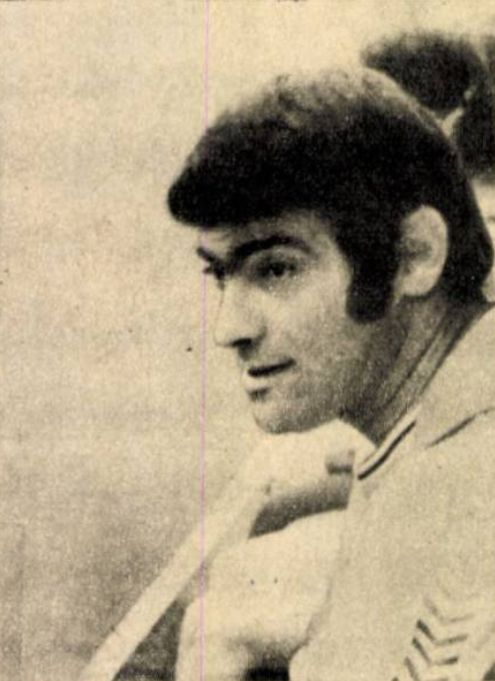

Personal information
- Nationality: Romanian
- Born: 3 September 1928 Bucharest, Kingdom of Romania
- Died: 2 November 2018 (aged 90)

Sport
- Sport: Handball

Teams managed
- Years: Team
- 1949–1955: CSU București
- 1953–1965: Romania
- 1955–1956: Flamura Roșie București
- 1956–1957: Steagu Roșu București
- 1957–1960: Progresul București
- 1960–1976: Universitatea Știința București
- 1973–1976: Romania
- 1976–1980: Constructorul Baia Mare
- 1980–1984: Chimistul Râmnicu Vâlcea
- 1996–2003: Rapid CFR București
- 2005–2007: Rapid CFR București

Constantin Popescu (3 September 1928 – 2 November 2018), nicknamed Pilică, was a Romanian professional handball manager and author of books on handball. He is the most successful coach in the history of Romanian female handball. He had pioneered handball in Romania. He graduated from the I.E.F.S., being the disciple of Professor Victor Cojocaru.

== International honours ==
- World Championship:
  - Gold Medalist: 1956, 1960, 1962
  - Silver Medalist: 1973
- European Champions Cup:
  - Winner: 1961
- IHF Cup:
  - Winner: 1984
- City Cup:
  - Winner: 2000
