= Sabine Klimek =

Romanian handballer (born 1991)

Personal information
- Full name: Sabine Karina Klimek
- Nationality: Romanian
- Born: 13 March 1991 (age 35) Timișoara, Romania
- Height: 1.73 m (5 ft 8 in)

Sport
- Sport: Handball
- Position: Playmaker
- Current club: HC Zalău

Youth career
- Years: Team
- 2000–2006: LPS Banatul Timișoara
- 2006–2008: CSȘ Nr. 2 Baia Mare

Senior clubs
- Years: Team
- 2009–2013: HCM Baia Mare
- loan: → HC Vlady Oradea
- 2014–2015: Mureșul Târgu Mureș
- 2015-: HC Zalău

Sabine Karina Klimek (born 13 March 1991 in Timișoara) is a Romanian handballer.

== Achievements ==
- Cupa României:
  - Finalist: 2014
