= Niculina Sasu =

Romanian handball player (born 1952)

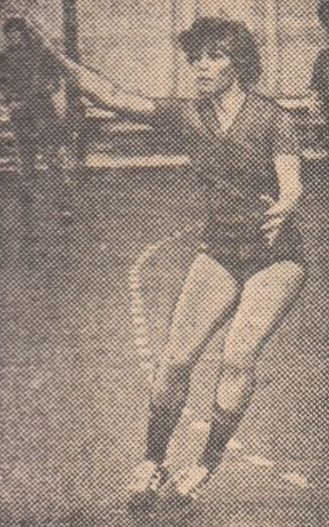

Personal information
- Born: 28 October 1952 (age 73)
- Nationality: Romanian
- Height: 175 cm (5 ft 9 in)

Senior clubs
- Years: Team
- –: CS Minaur Baia Mare

Niculina Sasu Iordache (born 28 October 1952) is a Romanian former handball player who competed in the 1976 Summer Olympics.

== Career ==
Sasu was part of the Romanian women's handball team, which finished fourth in Handball at the 1976 Summer Olympics. She played all five matches and scored six goals. In Romania, she played for CS Minaur Baia Mare.

Sasu was appointed to the Order of Sport Merit, first class (18 August 1976), "for outstanding results obtained at the Summer Olympic Games in Montreal – 1976, as well as for the contribution made to the development of sports activity and to increasing the prestige of Romanian sport internationally."
