= Ionela Stanca =

Romanian handball player (born 1981)

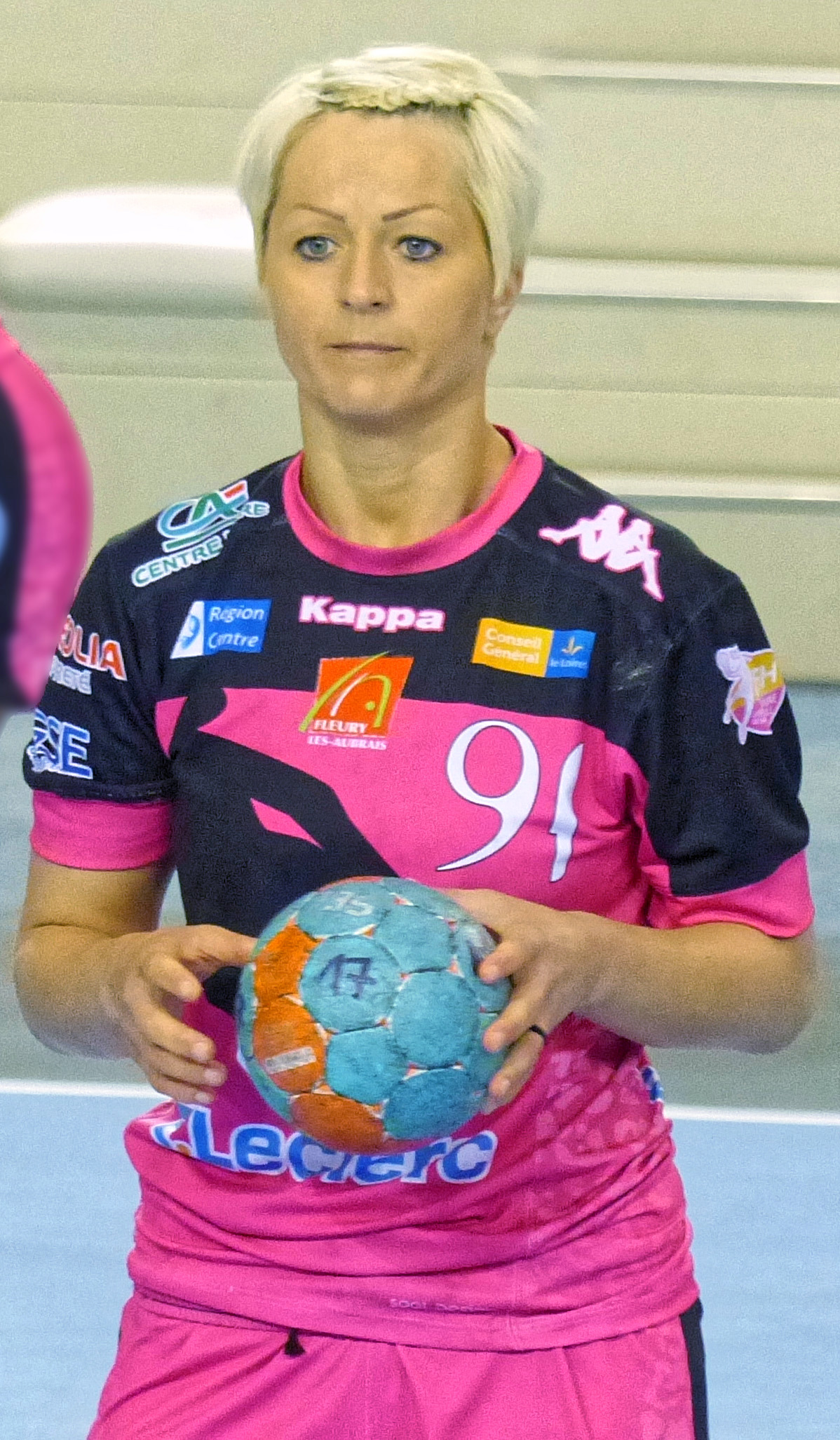

Personal information
- Nationality: Romanian
- Born: 9 January 1981 (age 45) Constanţa, Romania
- Height: 1.76 m (5 ft 9 in)

Sport
- Sport: Handball
- Position: Pivot
- Current club: Chambray Touraine Handball

Senior clubs
- Years: Team
- 1998–2003: Tomis Constanța
- 2003–2004: Podravka Koprivnica
- 2004–2006: HBC Nîmes
- 2006–2008: Oltchim Râmnicu Vâlcea
- 2008–2009: Rulmentul Braşov
- 2009–2013: Oltchim Râmnicu Vâlcea
- 2013–2014: Fleury Loiret HB
- 2014–2015: Chambray Touraine
- 2015–2017: AC Issoudun
National team
| Years | Team | Apps | (Gls) |
| 2000–2012 | Romania | 170 | (483) |
Medal record
Junior European Championship
| Gold medal – first place | 1999 Germany | Team |
Youth European Championship
| Gold medal – first place | 2000 France | Team |
World Championship
| Silver medal – second place | 2005 Russia | Team |
European Championship
| Bronze medal – third place | 2010 Denmark & Norway | Team |
- Updated on 12 December 2012

Ionela Stanca (née Gâlcă; born 9 January 1981) is a Romanian former professional handballer. She was voted into the All-Star Team in the 2007 World Women's Handball Championship.

== Achievements ==
=== Clubs ===
- Croatian Cup:
  - Winner: 2004
- Romanian Championship
  - Winner: 2007, 2008, 2010, 2011, 2012
- Cupa României
  - Winner: 2007, 2011
- Romanian Supercup
  - Winner: 2007
- EHF Champions League:
  - Finalist: 2010
  - Semifinalist: 2012
- EHF Champions Trophy:
  - Winner: 2007
- EHF Cup Winners' Cup:
  - Winner: 2007
- EHF Cup:
  - Semifinalist: 2009
- Coupe de France
  - Winner: 2014

=== National team ===
- Junior European Championship:
  - Gold Medalist: 1999
- Youth European Championship:
  - Gold Medalist: 2000
- World Championship:
  - Silver Medalist: 2005
  - Fourth Place: 2007
- European Championship:
  - Bronze Medalist: 2010
  - Fifth Place: 2008

== Individual awards ==
- Romanian National League Top Scorer: 2007

== Stats ==
Goals in Europeans’ Cups:

| Team | Season | Goals |
|---|---|---|
| (Croatia) Podravka Koprivnica | EHF Cup 2003/04 | 14 |
| (Romania) Oltchim Râmnicu Vâlcea | EHF Cup Winners' Cup 2006/07 | 60 |
| (Romania) Oltchim Râmnicu Vâlcea | EHF Champions League 2007/08 | 65 |
| (Romania) CS Rulmentul Urban Brașov | EHF Cup 2008/09 | 51 |
| (Romania) Oltchim Râmnicu Vâlcea | EHF Champions League 2009/10 | 60 |
| (Romania) Oltchim Râmnicu Vâlcea | EHF Champions League 2010/11 | 39 |
| (Romania) Oltchim Râmnicu Vâlcea | EHF Champions League 2011/12 | 15 |
| (Romania) Oltchim Râmnicu Vâlcea | EHF Champions League 2012/13 | 22 |
| Total | | 326 |
