= Muresul Târgu Mureș (women's handball) =

- Founded: 1959; 67 years ago 2018; 8 years ago
- Arena: Sala Sporturilor
- Capacity: 2,000
- League: Liga Națională
- Club colours

Clubul Sportiv Muresul Târgu Mureș, formerly known as CS Mureșul or SC Mureșul Târgu Mureș, is a women's handball team based in Târgu Mureș, Romania that competes in the Divizia A.

Location of CSM Târgu Mureș

== Honours ==
=== Domestic competitions ===
- Liga Națională
  - Winners (1): 1988
  - Second place: 1980, 1987, 1989
  - Third place: 1966, 1981
- Cupa României
  - Winners (2): 1987, 1988
  - Finalist: 1987

=== European competitions ===
- European Champions Cup:
  - Third place: 1989

== Former players ==
- (Romania) Angela Bloj
- (Romania) Sabine Klimek
- (Romania) Eszter Mátéfi
- (Romania) Éva Mózsi
- (Romania) Rozalia Șooș

== Former coaches ==
- (Romania) Eugen Bartha
- (Romania) Gheorghe Ionescu
- (Romania) Árpád Kameniczki
- (Romania) Ladislau Kulcsár
- (Romania) Valentin Szabó-Pop

== See also ==
- Progresul Târgu Mureș (women's handball) - Handball 11s
