= Bruno Holzträger =

Romanian handball player (1916-1978)

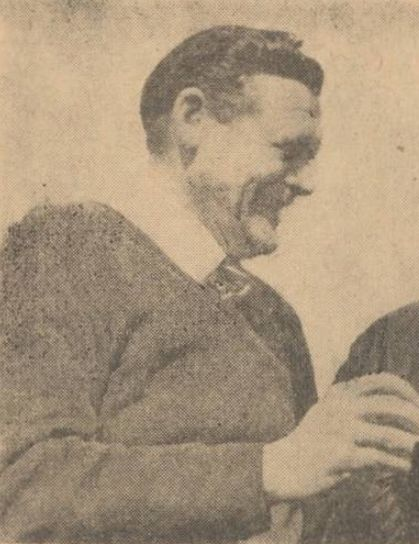
Holzträger, c. 1970

Bruno Holzträger (29 July 1916 – 15 November 1978) was a Romanian field handball player and coach of German origin. He played for the Romanian national team and competed in the 1936 Summer Olympics.

Holzträger was born on 29 July 1916 in Mediaș, Nagy-Küküllő County. He played field handball as a member of the athletic club Mediascher Turnverein and was considered one of the best in the world in the sport in the 1930s. He was selected to participate in the handball tournament at the 1936 Summer Olympics, the only time field handball was played at the games, as a member of the Romanian team. The Romanian team placed fifth out of six squads and Holzträger only appeared in one match, the one to decide the fifth and sixth-place teams. He was 20 years old when selected to the Olympics and continued playing more than a decade later, being a member of the state championship team at age 30.

Following his playing career, Holzträger became a noted coach and referee: he was considered one of the greatest handball coaches in the World War II period and in the post-war period, leading the women's team Karres Mediaș to three national championships.

Holzträger died in Mediaș at the age of 62 on 15 November 1978.
