= Gabriel Zugrăvescu =

Romanian handball coach (1924-1984)

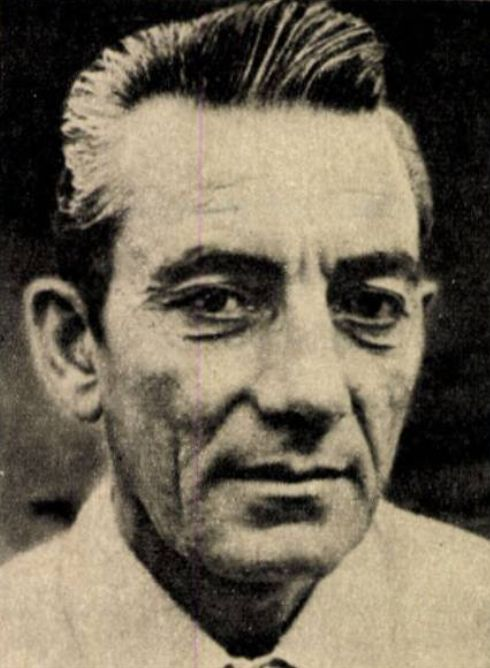

Personal information
- Nationality: Romanian
- Born: 1924
- Died: 1984 (aged 59–60)

Sport
- Sport: Handball

Senior clubs
- Years: Team
- 1950–1954: Știința Timișoara (men's)

Teams managed
- –: Știința Timișoara (women's)
- –: Progresul București (women's)
- –: Olimpia București (women's)
- –: Știința București (women's)
- –: Rapid București (women's)

Gabriel Zugrăvescu was a Romanian handball player and manager, and author of books on handball. He was nicknamed "Bebe".

Led by Zugrăvescu, the Romania women's national handball team finished 4th in the 1971 World Championship.

== Achievements ==
=== Player ===
==== Handball 11s ====
- Liga Națională:
  - Bronze Medalist: 1950

=== Manager ===
==== Handball 11s ====
- Liga Națională:
  - Winner: 1959, 1961
  - Silver Medalist: 1957, 1958, 1963

==== Handball 7s ====
- Liga Națională:
  - Winner: 1960, 1961, 1962, 1963
  - Silver Medalist: 1964
- European Champions Cup:
  - Winner: 1964

== Personal life ==
His father was a priest.
