= Lidija Horvat =

Croatian handball player (born 1982)

Personal information
- Nationality: Croatian
- Born: 5 May 1982 (age 44) Zagreb, SR Croatia, SFR Yugoslavia
- Height: 1.84 m (6 ft 0 in)

Sport
- Sport: Handball
- Position: Right back
- Current club: Rapid Bucuresti
National team
Years	Team	Apps	(Gls)
–	Croatia	166	(351)

Lidija Horvat (born 5 May 1982) is a Croatian handball player, who currently plays for the Romanian club Rapid Bucuresti and for the Croatia women's national handball team.

She played on the Croatian team at the 2008 European Women's Handball Championship, where Croatia finished 6th, and at the 2012 Summer Olympics, where Croatia finished in 7th.

In June 2015, she transferred to the Trabzon-based Turkish club Zağnos SK to play in the Turkish Women's Handball Super League.
