= Kira Trusova =

Russian handball player

Personal information
- Nationality: Russian
- Born: 28 June 1994 (age 32) Tolyatti, Russia
- Height: 1.82 m (6 ft 0 in)

Sport
- Sport: Handball
- Position: Goalkeeper
- Current club: HC Dunărea Brăila
- Number: 44
National team
- Years: Team
- –: Russia
Medal record
European Championship
Silver medal – second place	2018 France
IHF Junior World Championship
Silver medal – second place	2014 Croatia

Kira Trusova (born 28 June 1994) is a Russian handball player for HC Dunărea Brăila and the Russian national team.

She participated at the 2016 European Women's Handball Championship.
