= Simona Arghir-Sandu =

Romanian handball player (1948–1995)

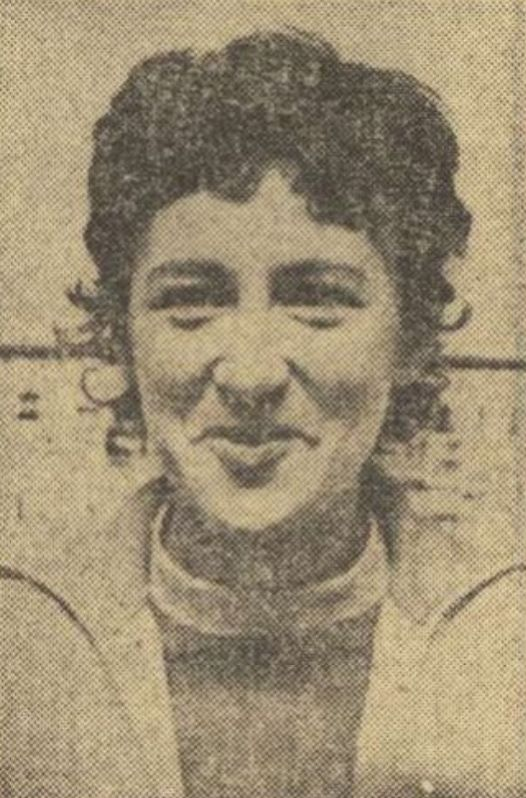

Personal information
- Nationality: Romanian
- Born: 4 September 1948 Lugoj, Romania
- Died: 2 September 1995 (aged 46)
- Height: 1.73 m (5 ft 8 in)

Sport
- Sport: Handball
- Position: Right back
National team
| Years | Team | Apps | (Gls) |
| – | Romania | 206 | (556) |
Medal record
World Championship
| Silver medal – second place | 1973 Yugoslavia |

Simona Arghir-Sandu (née Arghir; 4 September 1948 – 2 September 1995) was a Romanian handballer who played for the Romania national team. She also competed in the 1976 Summer Olympics, being part of the Romanian team which finished 4th and captained it.

== International honours ==
- World Championship:
  - Silver Medalist: 1973

== Personal life ==
Her husband Mircea Sandu was a football player and president of the Romanian Football Federation between 1990 and 2014 and their daughter Raluca was a professional tennis player. They also had a son named Dan Mircea.
