= National University of Physical Education and Sport =

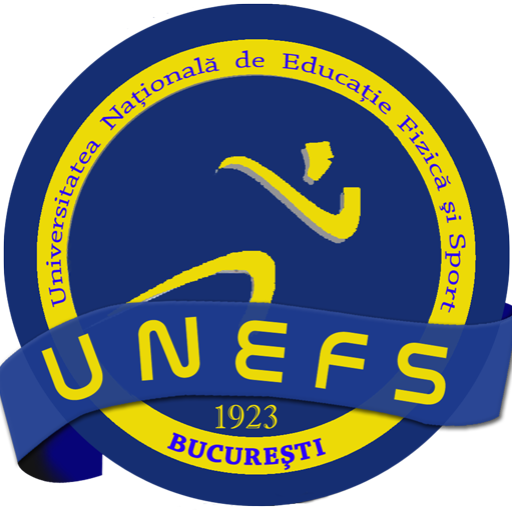
- Type: Public
- Established: 1922
- Location: Bucharest, Romania
- Website: unefs.ro

The Universitatea Națională de Educație Fizică și Sport (UNEFS), is one of the highest-profile state public higher education institution in Romania, and was founded on 1 December 1922, in Bucharest. It was the tenth institution of its kind in the world and the fifth in Europe.

UNEFS is one of the major physical education and sport institutions in Eastern Europe, and the degrees are awarded by the Ministry of National Education, and are recognised by other countries with whom bilateral agreements have been signed.

== Alumni ==
Notable alumni:

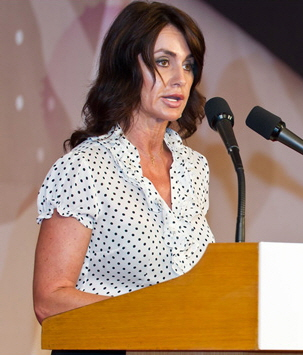
Nadia Comăneci, gymnastics' perfect 10 icon

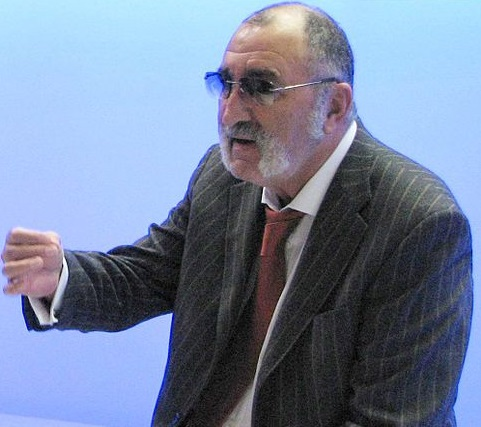
Ion Țiriac, tennis player and business magnate

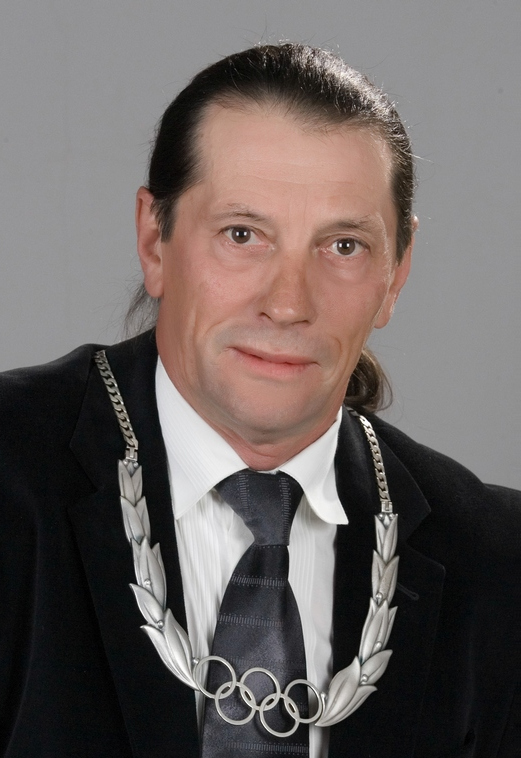
Ivan Patzaichin, canoe racing icon

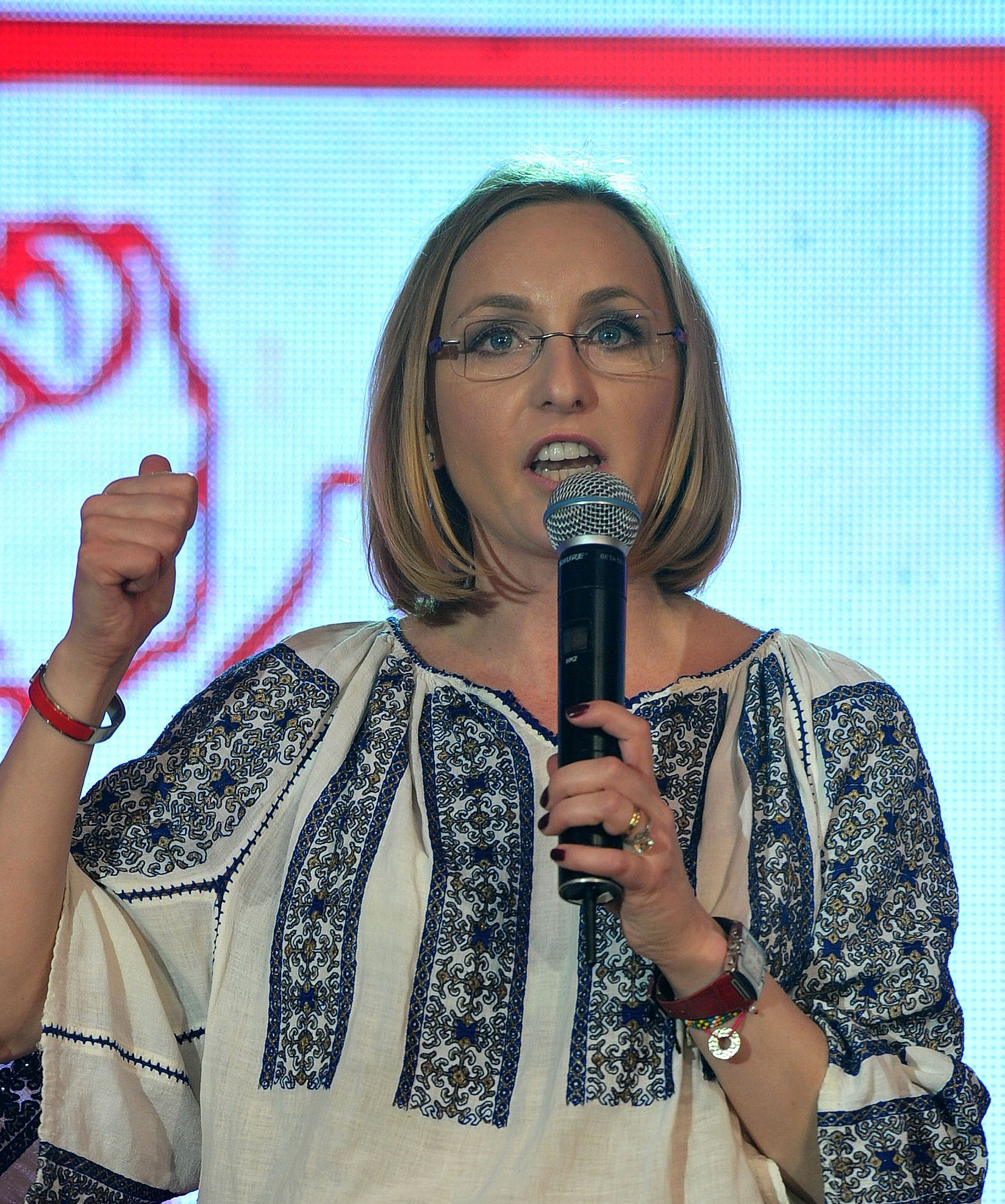
Gabriela Szabo, runner, politician and the current CSM București president

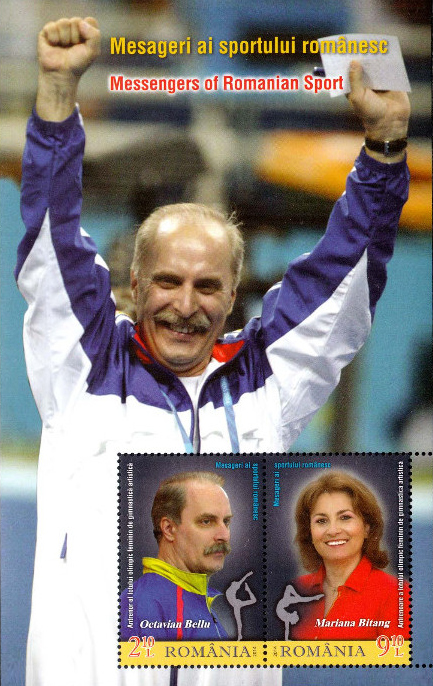
Octavian Bellu, world's most successful gymnastics coach

=== Other notable alumni ===
- Laura Badea – fencer, coach and sport administrator
- Mariana Bitang – gymnastics coach and political counselor
- Spyros Tsironis – politician
- Dan Grecu – gymnast and coach
- Marius Urzică – gymnast and coach
- Marian Drăgulescu – gymnast
- Iolanda Balaș – athlete, high jumper, and former president of the Romanian Athletics Federation and IAAF commissioner
- Anișoara Cușmir – athlete, long jumper, and coach
- Doina Melinte – athlete, runner, and former vice president of the Romanian Anti-Doping Agency and director of the National Agency for Youth and Sport
- Argentina Menis – athlete, discus thrower
- Violeta Beclea-Szekely – athlete, runner
- Sanda Toma – rower and professor
- Marioara Popescu – rower
- Nicolae Țaga – rower
- Elisabeta Lipă – most decorated rower in the history of the Olympics, president of the Romanian Rowing Federation, and former president of CS Dinamo București and politician
- Toma Simionov – sprint canoer
- Vasile Pușcașu – Greco-Roman wrestler
- Ion Draica – Greco-Roman wrestler, businessperson, and former politician, president of Romanian Federation of Wrestling and SSC Farul Constanța president
- Gheorghe Berceanu – Greco-Roman wrestler and coach
- Mihaela Buzărnescu – tennis player
- Ion Motroc – Former Professional football player
