= CSM Cetate Devatrans Deva =

Romanian women's handball club

- Full name: Clubul Sportiv Municipal Cetate Devatrans Deva
- Short name: Cetate
- Founded: 2002
- Arena: Sala Sporturilor
- Capacity: 1,200
- League: Liga Naţională

Cetate Devatrans Deva is a women's handball club from Deva, Romania.

Location of CSM Deva

== Honours ==
- EHF Challenge Cup:
  - Winners (1): 2001–02
  - Runners-up (1): 2003–04

== Notable players ==
- (Romania) Paula Ungureanu
- (Romania) Valentina Ardean-Elisei
- (Romania) Carmen Cartaș
- (Romania) Melinda Tóth
- (Serbia) Verica Nikolić
