= CS Minaur Baia Mare (women's handball) =

Romanian women's handball team

- Full name: Clubul Sportiv Minaur Baia Mare
- Short name: Minaur
- Founded: 1960; 66 years ago as HCM Baia Mare; 2015; 11 years ago as Minaur Baia Mare
- Arena: Lascăr Pană
- Capacity: 2,048 seats
- League: Liga Națională
- 2025–26: Liga Națională, 8th of 12
- Club colours
Home	Away

CS Minaur Baia Mare is a women's handball team based in Baia Mare, Maramureș, Romania, that competes in the Liga Națională and the European League (formerly known as EHF Cup).

Minaur refers to the gold mines of Baia Mare.

The women's handball section is part of Minaur only since 2015, year when the club was re-founded after its bankruptcy. The women's handball section was in fact founded on the basis of HCM Baia Mare, club that also went bankrupt in 2016. HCM was one of the oldest sport clubs in Baia Mare, with a tradition that started in 1960, one Romanian League title, 3 Romanian Cups, 3 Romanian Supercups and with notable results in the Women's EHF Champions League, Women's EHF European Cup and Women's EHF Cup Winners' Cup.

== Kits ==
HOME
2016–17	2017–18	2019–20	2020-

AWAY
2015–16	2016–17	2017–18	2018–19	2019–20	2020-

THIRD
2015–16	2017–18	2019–20	2020-

== Record of achievements ==
- Liga Naţională:
  - Gold: 2014
  - Silver: 1979, 2013, 2015, 2016
  - Bronze: 1980
- Cupa României:
  - Winners: 2013, 2014, 2015
  - Finalists: 1978, 1980
  - Semifinalists: 2007, 2016
- Supercupa României:
  - Winners: 2013, 2014, 2015

=== European ===
- EHF Champions League:
  - Quarterfinalists: 2015, 2016
- EHF Challenge Cup:
  - Finalists: 2003
- EHF Cup Winners' Cup:
  - Quarterfinalists: 1997

=== Other tournaments ===
- Baia Mare Champions Trophy:
  - Winners: 2014
- Bucharest Trophy:
  - Fifth Placed: 2015

== History of matches ==
Notes for the abbreviations in the tables below:

- Q2: Second qualifying round
- Q3: Third qualifying round
- R2: Second round
- R3: Third round
- R4: Fourth round
- R16: Round of 16
- QF: Quarter-finals
- SF: Semi-finals
- F: Final
- GS: Group stage
- MR: Main round
- EF: EHF Finals

=== European record ===
Season	Competition	Round	Club	Home	Away	Aggregate / position
2002–03	EHF Challenge Cup	R3	(Belgium) Initia HC Hasselt	30–17	23–17	53–34
2002–03	EHF Challenge Cup	R4	(Austria) U. Flaga Korneuburg	29–14	32–24	61–38
2002–03	EHF Challenge Cup	QF	(France) SA Mérignacais HB	23–17	27–31	50–48
2002–03	EHF Challenge Cup	SF	(Poland) Nata AZS-AWFiS Gdańsk	27–18	19–24	46–42
2002–03	EHF Challenge Cup	F	(Germany) Borussia Dortmund	27–21	16–24	43–45
2004–05	EHF Challenge Cup	R3	(Switzerland) LK Zug Handball	37–28	—N/a	1st
2004–05	EHF Challenge Cup	R3	(North Macedonia) RK Skopje	—N/a	31–21	1st
2004–05	EHF Challenge Cup	R3	(Faroe Islands) HC Florgarden	—N/a	28–25	1st
2004–05	EHF Challenge Cup	R16	(Germany) Buxtehuder SV	27–30	25–32	52–62
2007–08	Women's EHF Cup	R2	(Sweden) Skövde HF	23–13	30–22	53–35
2007–08	Women's EHF Cup	R3	(Denmark) Ikast-Bording	29–26	21–35	50–61
2008–09	Women's EHF Cup	R2	(Romania) HC Dunărea Brăila	33–23	27–31	60–54
2008–09	Women's EHF Cup	R3	(Turkey) Milli Piyango SK	29–26	22–24	51–50
2008–09	Women's EHF Cup	R16	(Germany) HC Leipzig	27–23	28–33	55–56
2009–10	Women's EHF Cup	R2	(Greece) GAS Anagennisi Artas	37–23	37–36	74–59
2009–10	Women's EHF Cup	R3	(Romania) Rulmentul Brașov	37–28	26–31	63–59
2009–10	Women's EHF Cup	R4	(Poland) MKS Lublin	27–30	19–24	46–54
2013–14	Women's EHF Champions League	Q2	(Denmark) Viborg HK	26–25	—N/a	1st
2013–14	Women's EHF Champions League	Q2	(Denmark) Team Tvis Holstebro	36–23	—N/a	1st
2013–14	Women's EHF Champions League	GS	(Germany) Thüringer HC	20–19	29–36	3rd
2013–14	Women's EHF Champions League	GS	(Hungary) Győri Audi ETO KC	21–33	26–28	3rd
2013–14	Women's EHF Champions League	GS	(Austria) Hypo Niederösterreich	24–23	20–23	3rd
2014–15	Women's EHF Champions League	GS	(Poland) MKS Selgros Lublin	30–25	28–22	3rd
2014–15	Women's EHF Champions League	GS	(Norway) Larvik HK	23–24	26–31	3rd
2014–15	Women's EHF Champions League	GS	(France) Metz Handball	23–24	24–34	3rd
2014–15	Women's EHF Champions League	MR	(Sweden) IK Sävehof	34–24	28–26	4th
2014–15	Women's EHF Champions League	MR	(Hungary) Győri Audi ETO KC	18–26	23–29	4th
2014–15	Women's EHF Champions League	MR	(Denmark) Viborg HK	32–22	31–30	4th
2014–15	Women's EHF Champions League	QF	(Russia) Dinamo-Sinara	25–23	25–30	50–53
2015–16	Women's EHF Champions League	Q2	(Belarus) BNTU-BelAZ Minsk	31–21	—N/a	1st
2015–16	Women's EHF Champions League	Q2	(Denmark) Team Esbjerg	—N/a	32–21	1st
2015–16	Women's EHF Champions League	GS	(Slovenia) RK Krim	35–28	33–27	3rd
2015–16	Women's EHF Champions League	GS	(Norway) Larvik HK	29–31	22–27	3rd
2015–16	Women's EHF Champions League	GS	(Russia) Rostov-Don	20–22	26–27	3rd
2015–16	Women's EHF Champions League	MR	(France) Fleury Loiret Handball	31–28	18–17	4th
2015–16	Women's EHF Champions League	MR	(Germany) Thüringer HC	38–27	25–23	4th
2015–16	Women's EHF Champions League	MR	(Hungary) FTC-Rail Cargo Hungaria	32–24	18–21	4th
2015–16	Women's EHF Champions League	QF	(Montenegro) Budućnost	24–29	25–32	49–61
2020–21	Women's EHF European League	GS	(Norway) Storhamar HE	33–29	40–27	1st
2020–21	Women's EHF European League	GS	(Russia) Astrakhanochka	30–27	27–33	1st
2020–21	Women's EHF European League	GS	(Germany) Thüringer HC	10–0	—N/a	1st
2020–21	Women's EHF European League	QF	(Romania) HC Dunărea Brăila	27–25	31–24	58–49
2020–21	Women's EHF European League	SF	(France) Neptunes de Nantes	34–36	—N/a	34–36
2020–21	Women's EHF European League	Third place	(Denmark) Herning-Ikast	33–31	—N/a	3rd
2021–22	Women's EHF European League	GS	(Poland) MKS Zagłębie Lubin	34–32	23–23	2nd
2021–22	Women's EHF European League	GS	(Germany) SG BBM Bietigheim	20–28	20–39	2nd
2021–22	Women's EHF European League	GS	(France) Neptunes de Nantes	28–26	29–34	2nd
2021–22	Women's EHF European League	QF	(Norway) Sola HK	40–32	29–29	69–61
2021–22	Women's EHF European League	SF	(Denmark) Viborg HK	24–28	—N/a	24–28
2021–22	Women's EHF European League	Third place	(Denmark) Herning-Ikast	28–29	—N/a	4th
2025–26	Women's EHF European League	Q3	(Denmark) HH Elite	33–22	21–27	54–49
2025–26	Women's EHF European League	GS	(Norway) Larvik HK	28–31	28–26	3rd
2025–26	Women's EHF European League	GS	(Germany) Thüringer HC	28–24	32–33	3rd
2025–26	Women's EHF European League	GS	(Hungary) Motherson Mosonmagyaróvári KC	34–28	26–28	3rd

== Players ==
=== Current squad ===
Squad for the 2026–27 season.

Goalkeepers

- 1 (Romania) Cristina Mihiș
- 12 (Croatia) Ivana Kapitanovic
- 85 (Romania) Daria Tocaciu

Wingers
LW

- 20 (Norway) Line Rusten
- 15 (Romania) Denisa Romaniuc

RW

- 10 (Brazil) Jessica Quintino
- 25 (Romania) Eliza Lăcusteanu

Line players

- 27 (Brazil) Sabryne Santos Souza
- 93 (Spain) Alba Spugnini

Back players
LB

- 29 (Croatia) Sara Sablic
- 13 (Spain) María Gomes Da Costa
- 84 (Belarus) Dziyana Ilyina

CB

- 2 (Romania) Andreea Ianăşi
- 8 (Romania) Teodora Damian
- 5 (Norway) Mille Tveit Porsmyr

RB

- 98 (Spain) Sayna Mbengue
- 99 (Romania) Anca Mițicuș

=== Transfers ===
Transfers for the 2026–27 season

Arriving

- (Croatia) Ivana Kapitanović (GK) (from (Italy) Handball Erice)
- (Norway) Mille Tveit Porsmyr (CB) (from (Norway) Oppsal)
- (Spain) Sayna Mbengue (RB) (from (Romania) Gloria Bistrița)
- (Croatia) Sara Sablic (LB)
- (Norway) Line Rusten (LW) (from (Denmark) Aarhus Håndbold)
- (Brazil) Sabryne Santos Souza (PV)

Leaving

- (Romania) Iulia Dumanska (GK) (to (Romania) CSM București)
- (Hungary) Nikolett Papp (RB) (to (Romania) CSM Slatina)
- (Romania) Clara Preda (GK)
- (Sweden) Amelia Lundbäck (CB) (to (Romania) CSM Slatina)
- (Poland) Emilia Galinska (LB)
- (Ukraine) Andriyana Naumenko (PV)

=== Staff members ===
- (Spain) Head Coach: David Ginesta
- (Romania) Assistant Coach: TBA

== Notable former players ==
- (Romania) Elisabeta Ionescu
- (Romania) Maria Bosi-Igorov
- (Romania) Hilda Hrivnak-Popescu
- (Romania) Niculina Sasu-Iordache
- (Romania) Mariana Iacob-Iluţ
- (Romania) Larisa Cazacu
- (Romania) Ildikó Kerekes
- (Romania) Cristina Mihai
- (Romania) Carmen Buceschi
- (Romania) Maria Pop
- (Romania) Nadina Dumitru
- (Romania) Victorina Stoenescu-Bora
- (Romania) Marinela Doiciu-Győrffy
- (Romania) Claudia Cetăţeanu
- (Romania) Magda Kengyel
- (Romania) Laura Crăciun
- (Romania) Ana-Maria Buican
- (Romania) Camelia Balint
- (Romania) Annamária Ilyés
- (Romania) Anca David
- (Romania) Florina Nicolescu
- (Romania) Eliza Buceschi
- (Brazil) Bárbara Arenhart
- (Norway) Camilla Herrem
- (Russia) Ksenia Makeeva
- (Russia) Ekaterina Davydenko
- (Romania) Adriana Nechita
- (France) Allison Pineau
- (Romania) Melinda Geiger
- (Netherlands) Lois Abbingh
- (Romania) Paula Ungureanu
- (Romania) Gabriela Perianu
- (Croatia) Katarina Ježić
- (Brazil) Alexandra do Nascimento
- (Romania) Luciana Marin
- (Romania) Patricia Vizitiu
- (Romania) Ionica Munteanu
- (Romania) Valentina Ardean-Elisei
- (Romania) Sonia Seraficeanu
- (Serbia) Jovana Kovačević
- (Sweden) Linn Blohm

== Notable former managers ==
- (Romania) Costică Buceschi
- (Romania) Constantin Popescu
- (Romania) Ioan Băban
- (Romania) Gheorghe Sbora
- (Romania) Gheorghe Covaciu
- (Romania) Ion Gerhard
- (Romania) Vasile Barbul
