= CSU Danubius Galați =

Romanian women's handball club

CSM Galați
- Founded: 2001; 24 years ago
- Dissolved: 2018; 7 years ago
- Arena: Dunărea
- Capacity: 1,500
- League: Divizia A
- 2018–19: Liga Națională, 13th of 14 (relegated)
- Club colours
Home	Away

CSU Danubius Galați was a professional women's handball club in Galaţi, Romania.

== Kits ==
HOME
2018–20	2020-

AWAY
2018–19	2020-

THIRD

2020-

== Honours ==
=== Domestic competitions ===
Liga Națională (National League of Romania)

- Third place: 1995-96, 1996-97, 2007–08

Cupa României (National Cup of Romania)

- Finalist: 1998-99, 2010–11
- Third place: 1995-96, 1996-97, 2001-02, 2007–08
