= CSU Neptun Constanța =

Romanian women's handball club

CSU Neptun Constanţa
- Full name: Clubul Sportiv Universitatea Neptun Constanţa
- Short name: Neptun
- Founded: 1975
- Arena: Sala Sporturilor
- Capacity: 2,000
- League: Divizia A
- 2018–19: Divizia A, Seria A, 2nd
- Club colours
Home	Away

CSU Neptun Constanţa, formerly known as CS Tomis Constanţa, is a women's handball club from Constanţa, Romania.

Location of CSU Neptun Constanța

== Kits ==
HOME
2013–14	2016–17	2017–19	2019–

AWAY
2016–17	2017–19	2020-

== Honours ==
- EHF Challenge Cup:
  - Runners-Up (1): 2006
- Liga Naţională:
  - Runners-Up (1): 1978
- Cupa României:
  - Runners-Up (1): 1978

== Notable coaches ==
- (Romania) Traian Bucovală
- (Romania) Dumitru Muşi
- (Romania) Lucian Rîşniţă
- (Romania) Codruț Hanganu
- (Romania) Rodica Pantea
- (Romania) Elena Frîncu
- (Romania) Cristian Barbulescu

== Notable players ==
- (Romania) Elena Frîncu
- (Romania) Elisabeta Roşu
- (Romania) Simona Manea
- (Romania) Corina Şchiopu
- (Romania) Ramona Mihalache
- (Romania) Mihaela Ignat
- (Romania) Mădălina Simule-Straton
- (Romania) Amelia Busuioceanu
- (Romania) Ionela Stanca
- (Romania) Cristina Zamfir
- (Romania) Bianca Tiron
- (Romania) Diana Petrescu
