= HC Dunărea Brăila =

Women's handball club from Brăila, Romania

- Full name: Handbal Club Dunărea Brăila
- Short name: Dunărea
- Founded: 1997; 29 years ago
- Arena: Sala Polivalentă Danubius
- Capacity: 2,200
- President: Adrian Manole
- Head coach: (Romania) Bogdan Burcea
- League: Liga Națională
- 2025–26: Liga Națională, 5th of 12
- Club colours
Home	Away

HC Dunărea Brăila is a women's handball club from Brăila, Romania, that competes in the Liga Națională and the European League (formerly known as EHF Cup).

Location of Dunărea Brăila

== Kits ==
HOME
2015–17	2017–

AWAY
2017–18	2018–

THIRD

2019–20

== Honours ==
=== Domestic competitions ===
Liga Națională

- Second place: 2017
- Third place: 2009, 2014

Cupa României

- Second place: 2024
- Third place: 2018, 2023

=== In European competition ===
- EHF European League:
  - Fourth place: 2024
  - Quarter-finalist: 2021
  - Round of 16: 2011, 2015
- EHF European Cup:
  - Quarter-finalist: 2008

== Current squad ==
The squad for the 2026/27 season

Goalkeepers

- 1 (Romania) Elena Șerban
- 12 (Romania) Bianca Curmenț
- 44 (Russia) Kira Trusova

Wingers
LW

- 5 (Romania) Daria Mihăilă
- 77 (Romania) Mariam Mohamed

RW

- 2 (Romania) Mihaela Mihai
- 22 (Romania) Beatrice Raicea

Line players

- 10 (Montenegro) Andrijana Tatar
- 17 (Croatia) Katarina Ježić
- 71 (Montenegro) Bobana Olteanu

Back players
LB

- 20 (Romania) Alisia Boiciuc
- 28 (Romania) Diana Lixăndroiu
- 35 (Russia) Valeriia Kirdiasheva

CB

- 13 (Romania) Cristina Laslo
- 24 (Romania) Elena Roșu
- 27 (Romania) Rebeca Necula

RB

- 55 (Romania) Ana-Maria Gavrilă
- 88 (Serbia) Anđela Janjušević

=== Transfers ===
Transfers for the season 2026-27

Joining

- (Romania) Bogdan Burcea (Head Coach) (from (Romania) CSM Corona Brașov)
- (Romania) Bianca Curmenț (GK) (from (Romania) CSM Corona Brașov)
- (Romania) Alisia Boiciuc (CB) (from (Romania) CSM Corona Brașov)
- (Romania) Cristina Laslo (CB) (from (Romania) CS Gloria Bistrița)
- (Romania) Mihaela Mihai (RW) (from (Romania) CSM București)
- (Romania) Rebeca Necula (CB) (from (Romania) SCM Râmnicu Vâlcea (handball))

Leaving

- (Croatia) Dejana Milosavljević (LB) (to (Croatia) RK Podravka Koprivnica)
- (Spain) Lara González Ortega (LB) (to (Romania) CS Gloria Bistrița)
- (Romania) Oana Borş (RW) (to (Romania) Rapid București)
- (Romania) Andreea Popa (CB/RB) (to (Romania) CSM Corona Brașov)
- (Spain) Mireya González (RB) (retires)
- (Romania) Mirabela Cotet (PV) (to (Romania) CSM Târgu Jiu (handbal feminin))
- (Belarus) Irina Mokat (PV) (to ?)
- (Denmark) Simone Böhme (RW) (to ?)
- (Poland) Daria Michalak (LW) (to (France) Brest Bretagne Handball)
