= CSM Roman (handball) =

Romanian handball club

- Full name: Club Sportiv Municipal Roman
- Short name: CSM
- Founded: 2001
- Dissolved: 2018
- Arena: Sala Sporturilor
- League: Divizia A
- 2018–19: Liga Națională, 14th of 14 (relegated)
- Club colours
| Home | Away |

Club Sportiv Municipal Roman, commonly known as CSM Roman, is a Romanian women's handball team based in Roman, Neamț County, that currently competes in Divizia A, the second level of Romanian women's handball. Founded in 2001 as HCM Roman, the team's most significant achievement was reaching the semifinals of the Challenge Cup in 2007.

== History ==
The team was founded in 2001 by the local authorities of Roman as HCM Roman. It quickly promoted to the first division and achieved its greatest success by reaching the semifinals of the Challenge Cup in 2007. HCM Roman became one of the most consistent teams in Liga Națională, managing to qualify for European cups for three consecutive years between 2014 and 2016, under the leadership of coach Florentin Pera.

In the summer of 2016, following the establishment of the city's sports club, the team changed its name from HCM Roman to CSM Roman. The team remained active until 31 October 2018, when it was dissolved by its main financier, the City Hall of Roman. However, the team was refounded in the summer of 2019 and enrolled in Divizia A, the second level of Romanian women's handball.

== Kits ==
HOME
| 2014–15 | 2016–17 | 2017–18 | 2018–19 |

AWAY
| 2011–12 | 2013–14 | 2016–17 | 2018–19 |
