= CSM Corona Brașov (women's handball) =

Professional women's handball club in Brașov, Romania

- Full name: Club Sportiv Municipal Corona Brașov
- Short name: Corona
- Founded: 1960; 66 years ago as Asociaţia Sportivă Rulmentul
- Arena: Sala Sporturilor "Dumitru Popescu Colibași", Brașov
- Capacity: 1,700
- Head coach: (Norway) Bent Dahl
- League: Liga Florilor
- 2025-26: 3rd
- Club colours
| Home | Away |

CSM Corona Brașov, formerly known as Rulmentul Brașov, is a professional women's handball club in Brașov, Romania, that plays in the Liga Florilor.

Location of CSM Corona Brașov

== Kits ==
HOME
| 2016–17 | 2017–18 |

AWAY

2016–17

== Sports Hall information ==
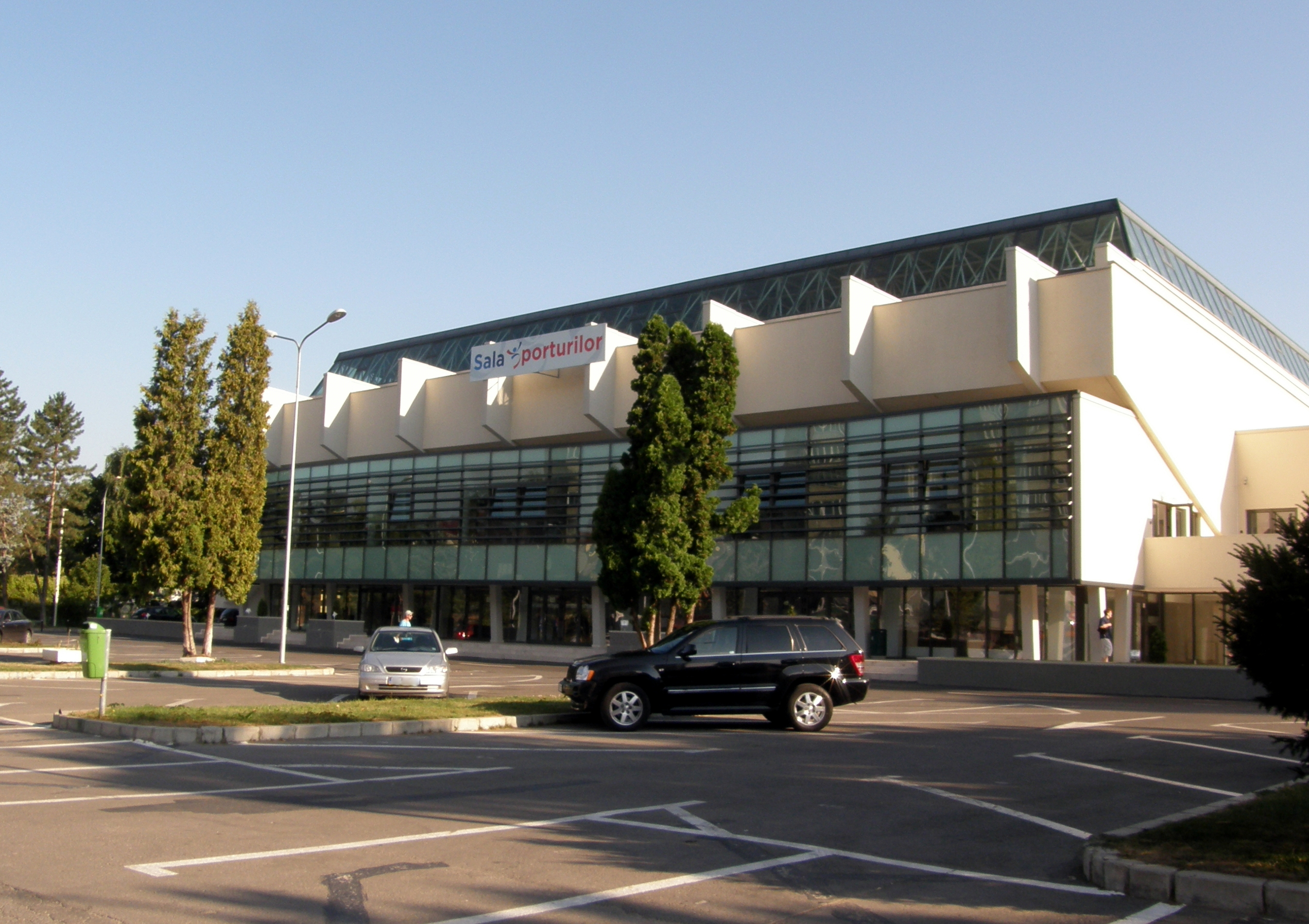
Home hall: Sala Sporturilor "Dumitru Popescu Colibași"

- Name: – Sala Sporturilor "Dumitru Popescu Colibași"
- City: – Brașov
- Capacity: – 1700
- Address: – Bulevardul Gării nr. 21, Brașov, Romania

== Honours ==
- Challenge Cup:
  - Winners (1): 2006
- Cup Winners' Cup:
  - Runners-Up: 2008
- EHF Champions League:
  - Third place: 1982
- EHF Cup:
  - Third place: 2009, 2016
- Liga Naţională:
  - Winners (2): 1981, 2006
  - Runners-Up: 1984, 1986, 2007, 2008, 2009, 2014, 2025
  - Third place: 1983, 1987, 2015, 2016
- Cupa Romaniei (Women's handball):
  - Winners (2): 1981, 2006
  - Runners-Up: 1984, 1995, 2007, 2013
  - Third place: 2014

== Team ==
=== Current squad ===
Squad for the 2026-27 season

Goalkeepers

- 13 (Hungary) Kinga Janurik
- 87 (Brazil) Renata Arruda

Wingers
Left Wings

- 19 (Romania) Gabriela Dumitrașcu
- 20 (Romania) Cristina Iordachi
- 25 (Romania) Éva Kerekes

Right Wings

- 14 (Romania) Marilena Neagu
- 23 (Romania) Ana Maria Berbece
- 31 (Poland) Magda Balsam

Line players

- 17 (Romania) Bianca Voica
- 72 (Hungary) Emőke Varga
- 91 (Russia) Kseniya Makeeva

Left Backs

- 7 (Romania) Bianca Bazaliu
- 8 (Romania) Anamaria Serban
- 11 (Romania) Andreea Bujor
- 99 (Romania) Sorina Grozav

Centre Backs

- 47 (Poland) Karolina Kochaniak
- 70 (Romania) Andreea Popa

Right Backs

- 4 (Hungary) Sára Afentáler
- 77 (Romania) Agata Stoican

=== Transfers ===
Transfers for the season 2026-27

Joining

- (Norway) Bent Dahl (Head Coach)
- (Denmark) Bo Rudgaard (Assistant Coach)
- (Romania) Paula Ungureanu (Goalkeeping Coach)
- (Hungary) Kinga Janurik (GK) (from (Hungary) Ferencvárosi TC)
- (Hungary) Emőke Varga (LP) (from (Hungary) Váci NKSE)
- (Hungary) Sára Afentáler (RB) (from (Hungary) Váci NKSE)
- (Poland) Magda Balsam (RW) (from (Romania) CSM Slatina)
- (Brazil) Renata Arruda (GK) (from (Romania) Gloria Bistrița)
- (Romania) Éva Kerekes (LW) (from (Romania) Gloria Bistrița)
- (Romania) Bianca Bazaliu (LB) (from (Romania) Gloria Bistrița)
- (Romania) Andreea Popa (CB) (from (Romania) Dunărea Brăila)
- (Romania) Ana Maria Berbece (RB)
- (Poland) Karolina Kochaniak (CB) (from (Poland) Zagłębie Lubin)
- (Russia) Kseniya Makeeva (PV) (from (Russia) Rostov-Don)

Leaving

- (Romania) Bogdan Burcea (Head Coach) (to (Romania) Dunărea Brăila)
- (Romania) Alisia Boiciuc (CB) (to (Romania) Dunărea Brăila)
- (Romania) Bianca Curmenț (GK) (to (Romania) Dunărea Brăila)
- (Montenegro) Dijana Mugoša (LW) (to (Romania) SCM Craiova)
- (Bosnia and Herzegovina) Anica Gudelj (GK) (to (Croatia) RK Podravka Koprivnica)
- (France) Laura Lasm (LB) (to (France) Saint-Amand Handball)
- (Netherlands) Tamara Haggerty (PV) (to (Romania) SCM Craiova)
- (Romania) Raluca Rădoi (GK) (to (Romania) SCM Craiova)
- (Serbia) Katarina Krpež (RW) (to (Hungary) Moyra-Budaörs Handball)
- (Serbia) Jelena Živković (RB) (to (Italy) PDO Handball Team Salerno)
- (Brazil) Larissa Araújo (LW) (to (Italy) PDO Handball Team Salerno)
- (Angola) Ruth João (PV)
- (Romania) Ana Maria Vacariu (LB)
- (Romania) Cristina Zamfir (LB) (retires)
- (Netherlands) Harma van Kreij (CB) (retires)

== Notable coaches ==
- (Romania) Dumitru Popescu-Colibași
- (Romania) Mariana Tîrcă
- (Germany) Herbert Müller
- (Romania) Bogdan Burcea
- (Romania) Ion Craciun

== Notable players ==
- (Romania) Irene Oancea
- (Romania) Mariana Tîrcă
- (Romania) Paula Ungureanu
- (Romania) Andreea Pricopi
- (Romania) Patricia Vizitiu
- (Romania) Cristina Neagu
- (Romania) Simona Gogîrlă
- (Romania) Aurelia Brădeanu
- (Romania) Denisa Dedu
- (Romania) Laura Chiper
- (Romania) Camelia Hotea
- (Romania) Cristina Zamfir
- (Romania) Ionica Munteanu
- (Romania) Adriana Țăcălie
- (Romania) Sorina Tîrcă
- (Romania) Eliza Buceschi
- (Romania) Daria Bucur
- (Romania) Ionela Stanca
- (Romania) Carmen Amariei
- (Austria) Gabriela Rotiș
- (Austria) Simona Spiridon
- (South Korea) Woo Sun-hee
- (South Korea) Chung Eun-hee
- (Spain) Alexandrina Barbosa
- (Hungary) Gabriella Juhász
- (Croatia) Lidija Horvat
- (Russia) Natalia Spirova
- (Slovakia) Miriam Simaková
- (Angola) Wuta Dombaxe
