= Edit Matei =

Romanian handball player (born 1964)

Personal information
- Nationality: Romanian, Austrian
- Born: 16 October 1964 (age 62) Sfântu Gheorghe, Romania

Sport
- Sport: Handball
- Position: Left back
- Current club: Retired

Youth career
- Years: Team
- –: CSȘ Sfântu Gheorghe

Senior clubs
- Years: Team
- –1982: Știința Bacău
- 1982–1991: Chimistul Râmnicu Vâlcea
- 1991–1996: Hypo Niederösterreich
National team
| Years | Team | Apps | (Gls) |
| 1980-1990 | Romania | 176 | (398) |
| – | Austria | 104 | (399) |

Edit Matei (née Török; born 16 October 1964), also spelled as Edith Matei, is a Romanian former handballer who played for the Romania national team. After the fall of communism in Romania, she chose to represent Austria. Together with Cristina Vărzaru, Matei holds the record for the most Champions League wins of a Romanian player (4). As a national team player, she competed at the 1992 Summer Olympics, but also at several world championships.

A severe knee injury effectively ended her career at the age of just 31.

In 2010, she was given the award of Cetățean de onoare ("Honorary Citizen") of the city of Râmnicu Vâlcea (where she resides).

== Trophies ==
- Liga Națională:
  - Winner: 1989, 1990, 1991
- Cupa României:
  - Winner: 1984, 1990
- Handball Liga Austria:
  - Winner: 1992, 1993, 1994, 1995
- ÖHB-Cup:
  - Winner: 1992, 1993, 1994, 1995
- EHF Champions League:
  - Winner: 1992, 1993, 1994, 1995
- IHF Cup:
  - Winner: 1984, 1989
- IHF Super Cup:
  - Winner: 1984

== Personal life ==
She is the younger sister of Maria Török-Duca.
