= Radu Voina =

Romanian handball player (born 1950)

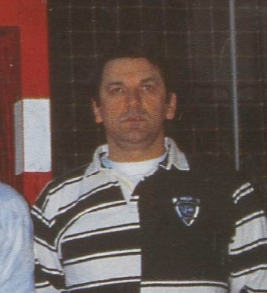
- Voina in 1994-95

Personal information
- Nationality: Romanian
- Born: 29 July 1950 (age 76) Șaeș, Romania
- Height: 1.85 m (6 ft 1 in)

Sport
- Sport: Handball
- Position: Right back

Youth career
- Years: Team
- –1969: Voinţa Sighişoara

Senior clubs
- Years: Team
- 1969–1972: Universitatea București
- 1972–1991: Steaua Bucharest
National team
Years	Team	Apps	(Gls)
–	Romania	269	(495)

Teams managed
- 1980–1991: Steaua (Player-coach)
- 1983–1984: Romania
- 1991–1996: Racing Strasbourg
- 1996–2000: SC Sélestat HB
- 2001–2004: Romania
- 2003–2005: ASL Robertsau HB
- 2006–2007: Steaua Bucharest
- 2008–2012: Romania (women)
- 2009–2010: CS Oltchim Râmnicu Vâlcea
- 2011–2012: CS Oltchim Râmnicu Vâlcea
Medal record
Olympic Games
Representing Romania
Silver medal – second place	1976 Montreal	Team
Bronze medal – third place	1972 Munich	Team
Bronze medal – third place	1980 Moscow	Team
World Championship
Gold medal – first place	1974 East Germany	Team
Coach for men's handball
Olympic Games
Bronze medal – third place	1984 Los Angeles	Team
Coach for women's handball
European Championships
Bronze medal – third place	2010 Denmark & Norway	Team
- Updated on 7 June 2012

Radu Voina (born 29 July 1950) is a Romanian former handball player and current head coach.

== Playing career ==
He competed in the 1972 Summer Olympics, in the 1976 Summer Olympics, and the 1980 Summer Olympics.

In 1972, he won the bronze medal with the Romanian team. He played four matches.

Four years later, he won the silver medal as part of the Romanian team. He played all five matches and scored five goals.

In 1980, he was a member of the Romania men's national handball team which won the bronze medal. He played four matches and scored four goals.

In the 1974 World Men's Handball Championship edition, Radu Voina became world champion with Romania.

In 1977, he won the EHF Champions League with Steaua Bucharest. He won the gold medal at the World University games in 1973 (Sweden), 1975 (Romania), 1977 (Poland).

== Coaching career ==
Voina began his coaching career with Steaua, he led them to nine national championships and one EHF Champions League final. He then led Romania to a bronze medal at the 1984 Summer Olympics in Los Angeles. He has coached among others French sides ASL Robertsau, Sélestat Alsace, RC Strasbourg, and the Romanian national men's handball team (twice), and the Romanian national women's handball team. Between February 2009 and May 2010 he was also the head coach of CS Oltchim Râmnicu Vâlcea.

In the 2009–2010 season, he managed to qualify his team CS Oltchim Râmnicu Vâlcea in the Women's EHF Champions League Final for the first time in the history of the club. Unfortunately his side lost to Viborg HK.

Voina coached the Romanian national team to a third-place finish in the 2010 European Women's Handball Championship.

At the end of the season, Radu Voina decided to take a break so he didn't renew his expired contract with CS Oltchim Râmnicu Vâlcea, but he remained the coach of Romania.

In March 2011, he replaced Anja Andersen on the bench of the Romanian team CS Oltchim Râmnicu Vâlcea.

His contracts with both Romania and Oltchim expired in June 2012 and Voina decided not to renew them.

== Distinctions ==
- In 1973, he was named a Master of Sports ("Maestru al sportului")
- In 1974, he was named an Honored Master of Sports ("Maestru emerit al sportului")
- In 1980, he was selected twice as one of the World Team members.
- In 1992, he was named an Honored Coach ("Antrenor emerit")
- A multi-purpose sports hall in Sighişoara is named after him.
- In 2009, he was decorated by Romanian president Traian Băsescu with the order "Meritul Sportiv" Second Class.
