= Gușoianca =

- Location within Romania

Location
- Country: Romania
- Counties: Vâlcea County
- Villages: Gușoeni

Physical characteristics
- Mouth: Pesceana
  - coordinates: 44.6809°N 24.1802°E
- Length: 13 km (8.1 mi)
- Basin size: 46 km^{2} (18 sq mi)

Basin features
- Progression: Pesceana→ Olt→ Danube→ Black Sea
- Tributaries
  - left: Burdălești, Negrăpița

The Gușoianca is a right tributary of the river Pesceana in Romania. It flows into the Pesceana in Streminoasa. Its length is 13 km (8.1 mi) and its basin size is 46 km^{2} (18 sq mi).
