= Pesceana (river) =

- Location within Romania

Location
- Country: Romania
- Counties: Vâlcea County
- Villages: Pesceana, Glăvile, Amărăști, Crețeni, Drăgășani

Physical characteristics
- Mouth: Olt
  - coordinates: 44.6293°N 24.2997°E
- Length: 44 km (27 mi)
- Basin size: 233 km^{2} (90 sq mi)

Basin features
- Progression: Olt→ Danube→ Black Sea
- Tributaries
  - left: Verdea
  - right: Olteanca, Nemoiu, Gușoianca

The Pesceana is a right tributary of the river Olt in Romania. It discharges into the Olt in Drăgășani. Its length is 44 km (27 mi) and its basin size is 233 km^{2} (90 sq mi).
