= Oana Manea =

Romanian handball player (born 1985)

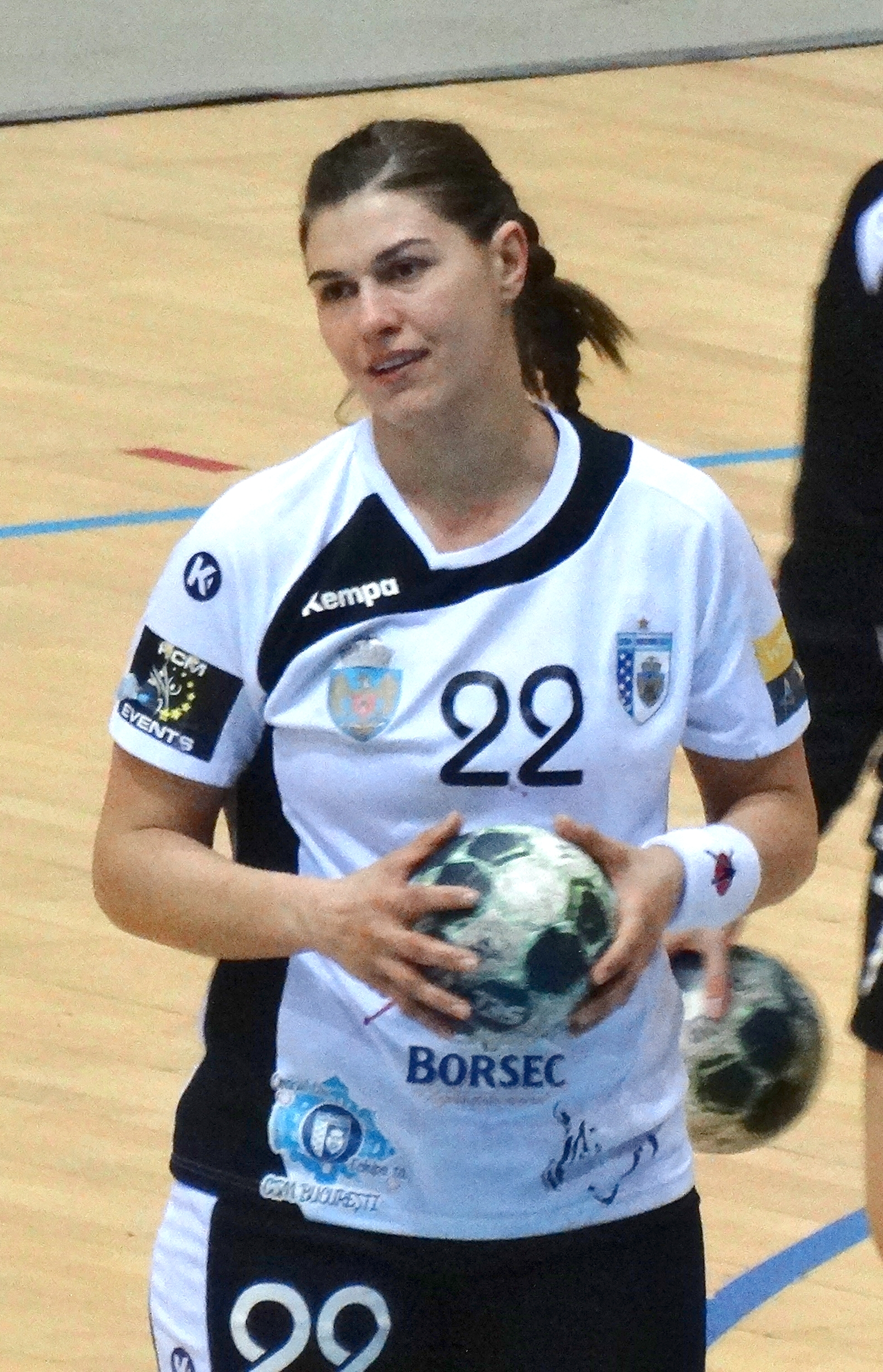
- Manea in 2017

Personal information
- Full name: Oana Andreea Manea
- Nationality: Romanian
- Born: 18 April 1985 (age 41) Bucharest, Romania
- Height: 1.75 m (5 ft 9 in)

Sport
- Sport: Handball
- Position: Pivot
- Current club: Rapid București
- Number: 22

Senior clubs
- Years: Team
- 2001–2013: CS Oltchim Vâlcea
- 2013–2014: RK Krim
- 2014–2019: CSM București
- 2021–2022: Rapid București
National team
Years	Team	Apps	(Gls)
–	Romania	193	(433)
Medal record
European Youth Championship
Silver medal – second place	2003 Russia	Team
World Championship
Bronze medal – third place	2015 Denmark
European Championship
Bronze medal – third place	2010 Denmark & Norway

Oana Andreea Lefter (née: Manea; born 18 April 1985) is a former handball player. She retired from the Romania national team in 2016. Her father, Dumitru Manea was a football player for the Romania men's national football team.

She was given the award of Cetățean de onoare ("Honorary Citizen") of the city of Bucharest in 2016.

== International honours ==
- EHF Champions League:
  - Winner: 2016
  - Silver Medalist: 2010
  - Bronze Medalist: 2017, 2018
- EHF Champions Trophy:
  - Winner: 2007
- EHF Cup Winners' Cup:
  - Winner: 2007
  - Finalist: 2002
- IHF World Championship:
  - Bronze Medalist: 2015
- European Championship:
  - Bronze Medalist: 2010
- GF World Cup:
  - Gold Medalist: 2009, 2010
- World University Championship:
  - Bronze Medalist: 2008
- European Youth Championship:
  - Silver Medalist: 2003

== Individual awards ==
- Romanian Handballer of the Year: 2011
- Carpathian Trophy Most Valuable Player: 2012
- Prosport All-Star Line Player of the Romanian Liga Națională: 2017, 2018
