= 2008–09 EHF Women's Champions League =

The EHF Women's Champions League 2008/09 was the 16th edition of the EHF Women's Champions League, a handball competition for top women's clubs of Europe managed by the European Handball Federation. It was won by Danish club Viborg HK who defeated Hungarian Győri Audi ETO KC at the finals with an aggregate score of 50–49. It was the second title for Viborg and the fifth for a Danish team.

German international Grit Jurack was the tournament's top scorer with 113 goals.

== Qualification Tournament 1 ==
=== Group A ===
Pos	Team	Pld	W	D	L	GF	GA	GD	Pts
1	(Turkey) Milli Piyango SK	3	3	0	0	102	64	+38	6
2	(Slovakia) SKP Bratislava	3	2	0	1	84	81	+3	4
3	(Italy) HC Sassari	3	1	0	2	71	83	−12	2
4	(Switzerland) LC Brühl Handball	3	0	0	3	62	91	−29	0

Source: EHF

5 September	SKP Bratislava (Slovakia)	30	25	(Italy) HC Sassari
5 September	Milli Piyango SK (Turkey)	36	19	(Switzerland) LC Brühl Handball
6 September	LC Brühl Handball (Switzerland)	24	30	(Slovakia) SKP Bratislava
6 September	HC Sassari (Italy)	21	34	(Turkey) Milli Piyango SK
7 September	HC Sassari (Italy)	25	19	(Switzerland) LC Brühl Handball
7 September	SKP Bratislava (Slovakia)	24	32	(Turkey) Milli Piyango SK

=== Group B ===
Pos	Team	Pld	W	D	L	GF	GA	GD	Pts
1	(Greece) AC Ormi-Loux Patras	3	3	0	0	83	73	+10	6
2	(Serbia) HC Naisa-Niš	3	2	0	1	78	74	+4	4
3	(Portugal) Madeira Andebol SAD	3	1	0	2	71	77	−6	2
4	(Netherlands) VOC Amsterdam	3	0	0	3	71	79	−8	0

Source: EHF

5 September	AC Ormi-Loux Patras (Greece)	27	21	(Serbia) HC Naisa-Niš
5 September	Madeira Andebol SAD (Portugal)	22	21	(Netherlands) VOC Amsterdam
6 September	VOC Amsterdam (Netherlands)	24	25	(Greece) AC Ormi-Loux Patras
6 September	HC Naisa-Nis (Serbia)	25	21	(Portugal) Madeira Andebol SAD
7 September	HC Naisa-Niš (Serbia)	32	26	(Netherlands) VOC Amsterdam
7 September	AC Ormi-Loux Patras (Greece)	31	28	(Portugal) Madeira Andebol SAD

== Qualification Tournament 2 ==
=== Group 1 ===
Pos	Team	Pld	W	D	L	GF	GA	GD	Pts
1	(Croatia) HC Podravka Vegeta	3	3	0	0	108	80	+28	6
2	(Germany) HC Leipzig	3	2	0	1	87	86	+1	4
3	(Spain) SD Itxako	3	1	0	2	84	75	+9	2
4	(Greece) AC Ormi-Loux Patras	3	0	0	3	65	103	−38	0

Source: EHF

3 October	S.D. Itxako (Spain)	27	29	(Croatia) HC Podravka Vegeta
3 October	HC Leipzig (Germany)	27	26	(Greece) AC Ormi-Loux Patras
4 October	AC Ormi-Loux Patras (Greece)	18	33	(Spain) S.D. Itxako
4 October	HC Podravka Vegeta (Croatia)	36	32	(Germany) HC Leipzig
5 October	HC Podravka Vegeta (Croatia)	43	21	(Greece) AC Ormi-Loux Patras
5 October	S.D. Itxako (Spain)	24	28	(Germany) HC Leipzig

=== Group 2 ===
Pos	Team	Pld	W	D	L	GF	GA	GD	Pts
1	(France) Metz Handball	3	2	0	1	96	88	+8	4
2	(Norway) Byasen HE	3	2	0	1	91	88	+3	4
3	(Russia) HC Dinamo	3	2	0	1	95	89	+6	4
4	(Turkey) Milli Piyango SK	3	0	0	3	84	101	−17	0

Source: EHF

3 October	Byasen HE (Norway)	33	32	(France) Metz Handball
3 October	HC Dinamo (Russia)	37	31	(Turkey) Milli Piyango SK
4 October	Milli Piyango SK (Turkey)	28	31	(Norway) Byasen HE
4 October	Metz Handball (France)	31	30	(Russia) HC Dinamo
5 October	Metz Handball (France)	33	25	(Turkey) Milli Piyango SK
5 October	Byasen HE (Norway)	27	28	(Russia) HC Dinamo

=== Group 3 ===
Pos	Team	Pld	W	D	L	GF	GA	GD	Pts
1	(Denmark) Ikast-Bording EH	3	3	0	0	127	95	+32	6
2	(Romania) C.S. Rulmentul-Urban Brasov	3	2	0	1	107	103	+4	4
3	(Poland) SPR SAFO Lubin	3	0	1	2	98	116	−18	1
4	(Slovakia) SKP Bratislava	3	0	1	2	80	98	−18	1

Source: EHF

3 October	Ikast-Bording EH (Denmark)	44	31	(Poland) SPR SAFO Lubin
3 October	C.S. Rulmentul-Urban Brasov (Romania)	30	21	(Slovakia) SKP Bratislava
4 October	SKP Bratislava (Slovakia)	29	38	(Denmark) Ikast-Bording EH
4 October	SPR SAFO Lubin (Poland)	37	42	(Romania) C.S. Rulmentul-Urban Brasov
5 October	SPR SAFO Lubin (Poland)	30	30	(Slovakia) SKP Bratislava
5 October	Ikast-Bording EH (Denmark)	45	35	(Romania) C.S. Rulmentul-Urban Brasov

=== Group 4 ===
Pos	Team	Pld	W	D	L	GF	GA	GD	Pts
1	(Denmark) FCK Handbold	3	3	0	0	93	49	+44	6
2	(Hungary) Dunaferr NK	3	1	0	2	74	78	−4	2
3	(Ukraine) HC Motor	3	1	0	2	79	98	−19	2
4	(Serbia) HC Naisa-Nis	3	1	0	2	66	87	−21	2

Source: EHF

3 October	Dunaferr NK (Hungary)	31	36	(Ukraine) HC Motor
3 October	FCK Handbold A/S (Denmark)	33	17	(Serbia) HC Naisa-Nis
4 October	HC Naisa-Nis (Serbia)	20	28	(Hungary) Dunaferr NK
4 October	HC Motor (Ukraine)	17	38	(Denmark) FCK Handbold A/S
5 October	HC Motor (Ukraine)	26	29	(Serbia) HC Naisa-Nis
5 October	Dunaferr NK (Hungary)	15	22	(Denmark) FCK Handbold A/S

== Group Matches ==
Top 2 teams from each group advance to the Main Round, while the third placed team from each group will compete in the Cup Winners' Cup.

=== Teams ===
Group A	Group B	Group C	Group D
(Russia) Zvezda Zvenigorod; Defending champion	(Austria) Hypo Niederösterreich; Austrian champion	(Russia) Handball Club Lada; Russian champion	(Denmark) Viborg HK; Danish champion
(Hungary) Győri Audi ETO KC; Hungarian champion	(Spain) Orsan Elda Prestigio; Spanish champion	(Norway) Larvik HK; Norwegian champion	(Slovenia) Krim Ljubljana; Slovenian champion
(North Macedonia) WHC Gjorche Petrov; Macedonian champion	(Montenegro) Budućnost T-Mobile; Montenegrin champion	(Romania) CS Oltchim Râmnicu Vâlcea; Romanian champion	(Germany) 1. FC Nürnberg Handball; German champion
(Denmark) Ikast-Brande EH; Danish second	(Denmark) FCK Håndbold; Danish third	(Croatia) RK Podravka Koprivnica; Croatian champion	(France) Metz Handball; French champion

=== Legend ===
Team advanced to the Main Round
Team will compete in the Cup Winners' Cup
Team is eliminated from the tournament

=== Group A ===
Pos	Team	Pld	W	D	L	GF	GA	GD	Pts
1	(Hungary) Györi Audi ETO KC	6	5	0	1	169	145	+24	10
2	(Denmark) Ikast-Brande EH	6	3	1	2	171	163	+8	7
3	(North Macedonia) WHC Gjorche Petrov	6	2	0	4	149	170	−21	4
4	(Russia) Zvezda Zvenigorod	6	1	1	4	156	167	−11	3

Source: EHF

31 October	WHC Gjorche Petrov (North Macedonia)	21	24	(Hungary) Györi Audi ETO KC
1 November	Ikast-Brande EH (Denmark)	31	25	(Russia) Zvezda Zvenigorod
9 November	Zvezda Zvenigorod (Russia)	30	22	(North Macedonia) WHC Gjorche Petrov
9 November	Györi Audi ETO KC (Hungary)	25	27	(Denmark) Ikast-Brande EH
15 November	Ikast-Brande EH (Denmark)	32	26	(North Macedonia) WHC Gjorche Petrov
16 November	Györi Audi ETO KC (Hungary)	29	23	(Russia) Zvezda Zvenigorod
2 January	WHC Gjorche Petrov (North Macedonia)	28	22	(Russia) Zvezda Zvenigorod
3 January	Ikast-Brande EH (Denmark)	26	27	(Hungary) Györi Audi ETO KC
10 January	Zvezda Zvenigorod (Russia)	28	28	(Denmark) Ikast-Brande EH
11 January	Györi Audi ETO KC (Hungary)	35	20	(North Macedonia) WHC Gjorche Petrov
17 January	Zvezda Zvenigorod (Russia)	28	29	(Hungary) Györi Audi ETO KC
18 January	WHC Gjorche Petrov (North Macedonia)	32	27	(Denmark) Ikast-Brande EH

=== Group B ===
Pos	Team	Pld	W	D	L	GF	GA	GD	Pts
1	(Austria) Hypo Niederösterreich	6	5	0	1	179	146	+33	10
2	(Montenegro) Budućnost T-Mobile	6	4	1	1	154	149	+5	9
3	(Denmark) FCK Håndbold	6	2	1	3	143	140	+3	5
4	(Spain) Orsan Elda Prestigio	6	0	0	6	131	172	−41	0

Source: EHF

1 November	Budućnost T-Mobile (Montenegro)	28	26	(Spain) Orsan Elda Prestigio
2 November	FCK Håndbold (Denmark)	27	28	(Austria) Hypo Niederösterreich
7 November	Hypo Niederösterreich (Austria)	34	27	(Montenegro) Budućnost T-Mobile
8 November	Orsan Elda Prestigio (Spain)	18	26	(Denmark) FCK Håndbold
15 November	Orsan Elda Prestigio (Spain)	26	31	(Austria) Hypo Niederösterreich
16 November	FCK Håndbold (Denmark)	22	22	(Montenegro) Budućnost T-Mobile
3 January	Budućnost T-Mobile (Montenegro)	26	25	(Austria) Hypo Niederösterreich
4 January	FCK Håndbold (Denmark)	28	19	(Spain) Orsan Elda Prestigio
9 January	Hypo Niederösterreich (Austria)	28	18	(Denmark) FCK Håndbold
10 January	Orsan Elda Prestigio (Spain)	20	26	(Montenegro) Budućnost T-Mobile
16 January	Hypo Niederösterreich (Austria)	33	22	(Spain) Orsan Elda Prestigio
17 January	Budućnost T-Mobile (Montenegro)	25	22	(Denmark) FCK Håndbold

=== Group C ===
Pos	Team	Pld	W	D	L	GF	GA	GD	Pts
1	(Romania) CS Oltchim Râmnicu Vâlcea	6	4	0	2	177	155	+22	8
2	(Croatia) ŽRK Podravka Koprivnica	6	4	0	2	170	163	+7	8
3	(Norway) Larvik HK	6	3	0	3	179	169	+10	6
4	(Russia) HC "Lada Togliatti"	6	1	0	5	159	198	−39	2

Source: EHF

31 October	ŽRK Podravka Koprivnica (Croatia)	30	27	(Russia) HC "Lada Togliatti"
2 November	CS Oltchim Râmnicu Vâlcea (Romania)	33	29	(Norway) Larvik HK
7 November	HC "Lada Togliatti" (Russia)	34	33	(Romania) CS Oltchim Râmnicu Vâlcea
9 November	Larvik HK (Norway)	27	26	(Croatia) ŽRK Podravka Koprivnica
15 November	ŽRK Podravka Koprivnica (Croatia)	20	30	(Romania) CS Oltchim Râmnicu Vâlcea
16 November	Larvik HK (Norway)	35	24	(Russia) HC "Lada Togliatti"
3 January	ŽRK Podravka Koprivnica (Croatia)	32	27	(Norway) Larvik HK
4 January	CS Oltchim Râmnicu Vâlcea (Romania)	30	19	(Russia) HC "Lada Togliatti"
10 January	HC "Lada Togliatti" (Russia)	28	34	(Croatia) ŽRK Podravka Koprivnica
11 January	Larvik HK (Norway)	25	27	(Romania) CS Oltchim Râmnicu Vâlcea
18 January	HC "Lada Togliatti" (Russia)	27	36	(Norway) Larvik HK
18 January	CS Oltchim Râmnicu Vâlcea (Romania)	24	28	(Croatia) ŽRK Podravka Koprivnica

=== Group D ===
Pos	Team	Pld	W	D	L	GF	GA	GD	Pts
1	(Denmark) Viborg HK	6	5	0	1	225	175	+50	10
2	(Slovenia) Krim Ljubljana	6	4	0	2	187	182	+5	8
3	(France) Metz Handball	6	2	0	4	173	188	−15	4
4	(Germany) 1. FC Nürnberg Handball	6	1	0	5	165	205	−40	2

Source: EHF

1 November	Metz Handball (France)	24	37	(Denmark) Viborg HK
2 November	1. FC Nürnberg Handball (Germany)	25	29	(Slovenia) Krim Ljubljana
8 November	Viborg HK (Denmark)	39	30	(Germany) 1. FC Nürnberg Handball
9 November	Krim Ljubljana (Slovenia)	26	31	(France) Metz Handball
15 November	Metz Handball (France)	32	24	(Germany) 1. FC Nürnberg Handball
15 November	Krim Ljubljana (Slovenia)	38	34	(Denmark) Viborg HK
3 January	1. FC Nürnberg Handball (Germany)	28	42	(Denmark) Viborg HK
3 January	Metz Handball (France)	29	33	(Slovenia) Krim Ljubljana
10 January	Viborg HK (Denmark)	35	27	(France) Metz Handball
10 January	Krim Ljubljana (Slovenia)	33	25	(Germany) 1. FC Nürnberg Handball
16 January	1. FC Nürnberg Handball (Germany)	33	30	(France) Metz Handball
17 January	Viborg HK (Denmark)	38	28	(Slovenia) Krim Ljubljana

== Main Round ==
The draw for the Main Round took place on 20 January 2009.

Pot 1	Pot 2
Hypo Niederösterreich	HC Podravka Vegeta
Viborg HK	Ikast-Brande EH
Győri Audi ETO KC	Budućnost T-Mobile
CS Oltchim Râmnicu Vâlcea	Krim Ljubljana

After the draw, the following groups were formed:

Group 1	Group 2
Hypo Niederösterreich	CS Oltchim Râmnicu Vâlcea
Viborg HK	Győri Audi ETO KC
Ikast-Brande EH	Budućnost T-Mobile
HC Podravka Vegeta	Krim Ljubljana

=== Group 1 ===
Pos	Team	Pld	W	D	L	GF	GA	GD	Pts
1	(Denmark) Viborg HK	6	5	0	1	196	166	+30	10
2	(Austria) Hypo Niederösterreich	6	5	0	1	195	166	+29	10
3	(Croatia) Podravka Koprivnica	6	2	0	4	177	186	−9	4
4	(Denmark) Ikast-Brande EH	6	0	0	6	154	204	−50	0

7 February	Podravka Koprivnica (Croatia)	30	31	(Austria) Hypo Niederösterreich
7 February	Ikast-Brande EH (Denmark)	24	38	(Denmark) Viborg HK
13 February	Hypo Niederösterreich (Austria)	32	24	(Denmark) Ikast-Brande EH
14 February	Viborg HK (Denmark)	32	26	(Croatia) Podravka Koprivnica
20 February	Hypo Niederösterreich (Austria)	30	28	(Denmark) Viborg HK
21 February	Ikast-Brande EH (Denmark)	28	31	(Croatia) Podravka Koprivnica
28 February	Ikast-Brande EH (Denmark)	23	33	(Austria) Hypo Niederösterreich
28 February	Podravka Koprivnica (Croatia)	26	31	(Denmark) Viborg HK
13 March	Viborg HK (Denmark)	34	29	(Denmark) Ikast-Brande EH
13 March	Hypo Niederösterreich (Austria)	38	28	(Croatia) Podravka Koprivnica
21 March	Podravka Koprivnica (Croatia)	36	26	(Denmark) Ikast-Brande EH
21 March	Viborg HK (Denmark)	33	31	(Austria) Hypo Niederösterreich

=== Group 2 ===
Pos	Team	Pld	W	D	L	GF	GA	GD	Pts
1	(Hungary) Györi Audi ETO KC	6	4	1	1	182	173	+9	9
2	(Romania) CS Oltchim Râmnicu Vâlcea	6	3	0	3	179	166	+13	6
3	(Montenegro) Budućnost T-Mobile	6	2	1	3	163	177	−14	5
4	(Slovenia) Krim Ljubljana	6	2	0	4	196	204	−8	4

7 February	Krim Ljubljana (Slovenia)	31	35	(Hungary) Györi Audi ETO KC
8 February	Budućnost T-Mobile (Montenegro)	23	22	(Romania) CS Oltchim Râmnicu Vâlcea
15 February	Györi Audi ETO KC (Hungary)	31	27	(Montenegro) Budućnost T-Mobile
15 February	CS Oltchim Râmnicu Vâlcea (Romania)	36	30	(Slovenia) Krim Ljubljana
21 February	CS Oltchim Râmnicu Vâlcea (Romania)	28	26	(Hungary) Györi Audi ETO KC
22 February	Krim Ljubljana (Slovenia)	35	28	(Montenegro) Budućnost T-Mobile
28 February	Krim Ljubljana (Slovenia)	35	34	(Romania) CS Oltchim Râmnicu Vâlcea
28 February	Budućnost T-Mobile (Montenegro)	26	26	(Hungary) Györi Audi ETO KC
15 March	Györi Audi ETO KC (Hungary)	34	33	(Slovenia) Krim Ljubljana
15 March	CS Oltchim Râmnicu Vâlcea (Romania)	31	22	(Montenegro) Budućnost T-Mobile
21 March	Györi Audi ETO KC (Hungary)	30	28	(Romania) CS Oltchim Râmnicu Vâlcea
21 March	Budućnost T-Mobile (Montenegro)	37	32	(Slovenia) Krim Ljubljana

== Final round ==
The semi-finals and finals are played in two legs of home and away matches. Viborg and Győr had home court advantage for the second leg of the semifinals as winners of their respective groups. Also, there was no need to perform a draw to decide home and away rights for the finals. According to EHF regulations, Viborg would get home court for the first match because they played a final in the last three years (2005/06).

Semi-finals
1	Oltchim Rm. Vâlcea	28	21	49
4	Viborg HK	34	21	55
3	Hypo Niederösterreich	26	21	47
2	Győri Audi ETO KC	25	29	54

Final
Viborg HK	24	26	50
Győri Audi ETO KC	26	23	49

=== Semifinals ===
First leg

12 April 2009; 18:30 (UTC+3)	CS Oltchim Râmnicu Vâlcea	28 – 34	Viborg HK	"Traian" Sports Hall, Râmnicu Vâlcea; Attendance: 3,000; Referees: Korres, Migas (GRE)
12 April 2009; 18:30 (UTC+3)	Ardean-Elisei 6	(11-16)	Jurack, Mikkelsen 7	"Traian" Sports Hall, Râmnicu Vâlcea; Attendance: 3,000; Referees: Korres, Migas (GRE)
12 April 2009; 18:30 (UTC+3)	3× (yellow card) 1× (suspension)	(report)	3× (yellow card) 6× (suspension)	"Traian" Sports Hall, Râmnicu Vâlcea; Attendance: 3,000; Referees: Korres, Migas (GRE)

12 April 2009; 20:22 (UTC+2)	Hypo Niederösterreich	26 – 25	Győri Audi ETO KC	BSFZ Südstadt, Maria Enzersdorf; Attendance: 1,200; Referees: Togstad, Kristiansen (NOR)
12 April 2009; 20:22 (UTC+2)	do Nascimento 6	(15-13)	Görbicz 7	BSFZ Südstadt, Maria Enzersdorf; Attendance: 1,200; Referees: Togstad, Kristiansen (NOR)
12 April 2009; 20:22 (UTC+2)	2× (yellow card) 4× (suspension)	(report)	2× (yellow card) 2× (suspension)	BSFZ Südstadt, Maria Enzersdorf; Attendance: 1,200; Referees: Togstad, Kristiansen (NOR)

Second leg

18 April 2009; 14:05 (UTC+2)	Viborg HK	21 – 21	CS Oltchim Râmnicu Vâlcea	Viborg Stadionhal, Viborg; Attendance: 2,000; Referees: Stolarovs, Licis (LAT)
18 April 2009; 14:05 (UTC+2)	Althaus 6	(8-12)	Lecuşanu 7	Viborg Stadionhal, Viborg; Attendance: 2,000; Referees: Stolarovs, Licis (LAT)
18 April 2009; 14:05 (UTC+2)	3× (yellow card) 5× (suspension) 1× (red card)	(report)	3× (yellow card) 2× (suspension)	Viborg Stadionhal, Viborg; Attendance: 2,000; Referees: Stolarovs, Licis (LAT)

19 April 2009; 16:15 (UTC+2)	Győri Audi ETO KC	29 – 21	Hypo Niederösterreich	Magvassy Mihály Sports Hall, Győr; Attendance: 2,800; Referees: B. & R. Methe (GER)
19 April 2009; 16:15 (UTC+2)	Görbicz 13	(12-9)	Tóth 5	Magvassy Mihály Sports Hall, Győr; Attendance: 2,800; Referees: B. & R. Methe (GER)
19 April 2009; 16:15 (UTC+2)	3× (yellow card) 5× (suspension) 1× (red card)	(report)	3× (yellow card) 5× (suspension) 1× (red card)	Magvassy Mihály Sports Hall, Győr; Attendance: 2,800; Referees: B. & R. Methe (GER)

=== Finals ===
9 May 2009; 16:15 (UTC+2)	Viborg HK	24 – 26	Győri Audi ETO KC	Gigantium, Aalborg; Attendance: 5,600; Referees: Geipel, Helbig (GER)
9 May 2009; 16:15 (UTC+2)	Althaus, Skov 6	(14-15)	Tomori 7	Gigantium, Aalborg; Attendance: 5,600; Referees: Geipel, Helbig (GER)
9 May 2009; 16:15 (UTC+2)	3× (yellow card) 5× (suspension)	(report)	2× (yellow card) 2× (suspension) 1× (red card)	Gigantium, Aalborg; Attendance: 5,600; Referees: Geipel, Helbig (GER)

16 May 2009; 16:15 (UTC+2)	Győri Audi ETO KC	23 – 26	Viborg HK	Veszprém Aréna, Veszprém; Attendance: 5,100; Referees: Muro, Rodríguez (ESP)
16 May 2009; 16:15 (UTC+2)	Kovacsics 6	(10-14)	Mikkelsen 7	Veszprém Aréna, Veszprém; Attendance: 5,100; Referees: Muro, Rodríguez (ESP)
16 May 2009; 16:15 (UTC+2)	2× (yellow card) 3× (suspension) 1× (red card)	(report)	3× (yellow card) 8× (suspension) 1× (red card)	Veszprém Aréna, Veszprém; Attendance: 5,100; Referees: Muro, Rodríguez (ESP)

EHF Champions League
2008/09 Winners

Viborg HK
Second Title

== Top scorers ==
As published by the EHF

Rank	Name	Club	Goals
1	Grit Jurack	Viborg HK	113
2	Anita Görbicz	Győri Audi ETO KC	94
3	Andrea Lekić	Krim Ljubljana	88
4	Tímea Tóth	Hypo Niederösterreich	80
5	Alexandra do Nascimento	Hypo Niederösterreich	79
6	Katarina Bulatović	Budućnost T-Mobile	75
6	Zsuzsanna Tomori	Győri Audi ETO KC	75
8	Bojana Popović	Viborg HK	73
9	Orsolya Vérten	Győri Audi ETO KC	71
10	Narcisa Lecuşanu	CS Oltchim Râmnicu Vâlcea	66
10	Rikke Skov	Viborg HK	66
12	Linn-Kristin Riegelhuth	Larvik HK	61
13	Mette Sjøberg	Ikast-Brande EH	60
14	Gorica Acimovic	Hypo Niederösterreich	59
14	Oana Manea	CS Oltchim Râmnicu Vâlcea	59
16	Henriette Mikkelsen	Viborg HK	58
17	Gro Hammerseng	Ikast-Brande EH	56
18	Valentina Ardean-Elisei	CS Oltchim Râmnicu Vâlcea	55
18	Dijana Golubić	Krim Ljubljana	55
18	Andrea Penezić	Podravka Koprivnica	55
21	Katarina Mravikova	Győri Audi ETO KC	53
21	Renata Mörtel	Krim Ljubljana	53
23	Kristina Franić	Podravka Koprivnica	52
23	Cristina Vărzaru	Viborg HK	52
25	Ana Đokić	Podravka Koprivnica	48
25	Adina Fiera	CS Oltchim Râmnicu Vâlcea	48
25	Jovanka Radičević	Budućnost T-Mobile	48
