= Adriana Crăciun =

Romanian handball player (born 1989)

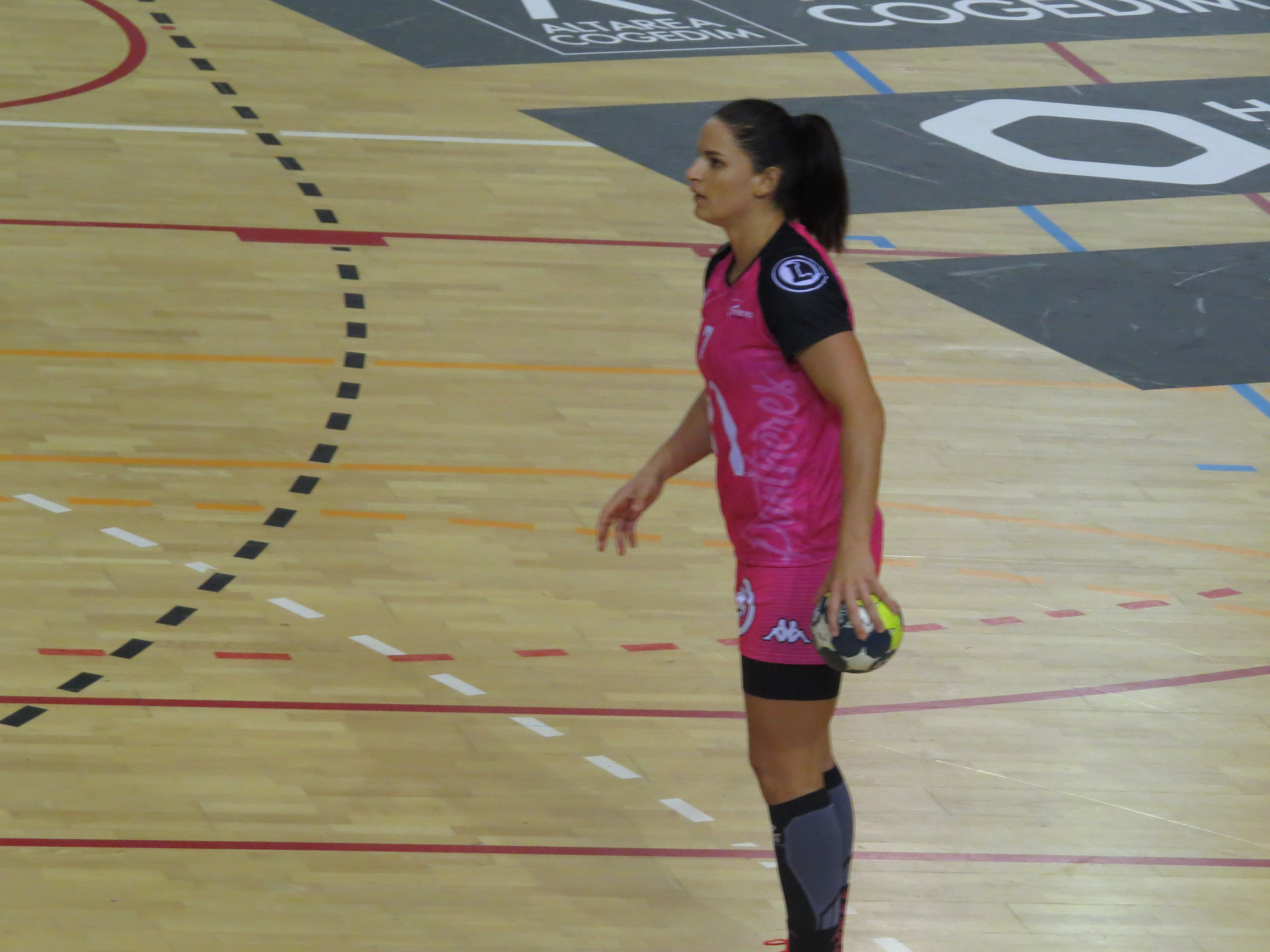

Personal information
- Full name: Adriana-Gabriela Crăciun
- Nationality: Romanian
- Born: 29 January 1989 (age 37) Slatina, Romania
- Height: 1.80 m (5 ft 11 in)

Sport
- Sport: Handball
- Position: Left back
- Current club: SCM Craiova

Senior clubs
- Years: Team
- 2006–2011: CS Oltchim Râmnicu Vâlcea
- 2011–2012: ŽRK Budućnost
- 2012–2017: Corona Brașov
- 2017-2019: Fleury Loiret HB
- 2019-2020: Măgura Cisnădie
- 2020-: SCM Craiova
National team
Years	Team	Apps	(Gls)
–	Romania	38	(58)
Medal record
European Youth Championship
Silver medal – second place	2005 Austria	Team
European Junior Championship
Bronze medal – third place	2007 Turkey	Team

Adriana-Gabriela Crăciun (née Țăcălie; born 29 January 1989) is a Romanian handballer who plays for SCM Craiova.

== Achievements ==
- Liga Naţională:
  - Winner: 2007, 2008, 2009, 2010, 2011
  - Runner-up: 2014
- Romanian Cup:
  - Winner: 2007, 2011
  - Finalist: 2013
- EHF Cup Winners' Cup
  - Winner: 2007
- EHF Champions Trophy
  - Winner: 2007
- EHF Champions League:
  - Winner: 2012
  - Finalist: 2010
- Montenegrin Championship:
  - Winner: 2012
- Montenegrin Cup:
  - Winner: 2012
- EHF Cup:
  - Semifinalist: 2015
