= 2009–10 EHF Women's Champions League =

The 2009–10 EHF Women's Champions League was the 17th edition of the EHF Women's Champions League, a handball competition for top women's clubs of Europe managed by the European Handball Federation. It was won by Danish club Viborg HK who defeated Romanian CS Oltchim Râmnicu Vâlcea at the finals with an aggregate score of 60–52. It was the third title for Viborg and the sixth for a Danish team.

== Place distribution ==
A total of 30 teams participated in the 2009/10 Champions League, from 22 EHF federations. Each nation received a number of slots according to the 2008 ranking. The first 24 nations were allowed to participate in the tournament with their national champion (Iceland has not registered a team). The nations ranked 1 to 7 received an additional slot, as well as the defending champion's federation (Denmark).

Since Viborg HK, 2009 title holder, qualified through domestic league placement, the defending champion wild card was awarded to FCK Håndbold.

On 19 June 2009, Macedonian champion Kometal withdrew from the tournament due to economic problems. As a consequence, the EHF promoted French champion Metz from Qualification Tournament 2 to Group Matches, and Greek champion Ormi Patras from Qualification Tournament 1 to Qualification Tournament 2.

== Teams ==
Group matches
(Denmark) Viborg^{TH}	(Austria) Hypo	(Hungary) Győr	(Russia) Dinamo Volgograd
(Romania) Oltchim Vâlcea	(Slovenia) Krim	(Croatia) Podravka	(Norway) Larvik
(Montenegro) Budućnost	(Germany) Leipzig	(Spain) Itxako	(France) Metz (Note: Moved up after Kometal withdraw.)
Qualification Tournament 2
(Denmark) Aalborg	(Hungary) Budapest Bank FTC	(Russia) Zvezda Zvenigorod	(Romania) Rulmentul Braşov
(Slovenia) Olimpija	(Norway) Byåsen	(Spain) Sagunto	(Denmark) FCK Håndbold
(Ukraine) Smart	(Poland) Lublin	(Slovakia) Bratislava	(Greece) Ormi Patras
Qualification Tournament 1
(Turkey) Milli Piyango	(Serbia) Vrnjačka Banja	(Portugal) Madeira	
(Italy) Sassari	(Netherlands) Amsterdam	(Switzerland) Brühl	

th Title Holder

== Round dates ==
Phase	Round	Draw date	First leg	Second leg
Qualifying	Qualification Tournament 1	18 June 2009	4–6 September 2009	
Qualifying	Qualification Tournament 2	18 June 2009	2–4 October 2009	
Group Matches	Matchday 1	24 June 2009	24–25 October 2009	
Group Matches	Matchday 2	24 June 2009	30 October – 1 November 2009	
Group Matches	Matchday 3	24 June 2009	7–8 November 2009	
Group Matches	Matchday 4	24 June 2009	14–15 November 2009	
Group Matches	Matchday 5	24 June 2009	9–10 January 2010	
Group Matches	Matchday 6	24 June 2009	16–17 January 2010	
Main Round	Matchday 1	19 January 2010	6–7 February 2010	
Main Round	Matchday 2	19 January 2010	13–14 February 2010	
Main Round	Matchday 3	19 January 2010	20–21 February 2010	
Main Round	Matchday 4	19 January 2010	6–7 March 2010	
Main Round	Matchday 5	19 January 2010	13–14 March 2010	
Main Round	Matchday 6	19 January 2010	20–21 March 2010	
Final Round	Semi-finals		10–11 April 2010	17–18 April 2010
Final Round	Final	20 April 2010	8–9 May 2010	15–16 May 2010

== Qualifying rounds ==
The draw for both tournaments took place on 18 June 2009 in Vienna. The rights to organize and host the group matches were also decided in this draw.

=== Qualification Tournament 1 ===
Six teams were divided into two groups of three teams. Two losers of the Qualification Tournament 1 entered the EHF Cup at Round 2. The first and second placed team of each group advanced to the second Qualification Tournament. Group A was organized by Brühl in St. Gallen, Switzerland, while Group B was hosted by Milli Piyango in Ankara, Turkey.

Both Brühl and Milli Piyango won their respective hosted group. The two winners, along with second placed clubs Sassari and Amsterdam, played the Qualification Tournament 2. By finishing last, Vrnjačka Banja and Madeira failed to qualify for the next Champions League round, but advanced to the EHF Cup instead.

==== Group A ====
Team	Pld	W	D	L	GF	GA	GD	Pts
Brühl (SUI)	2	2	0	0	58	49	+9	4
Sassari (ITA)	2	1	0	1	58	58	0	2
Vrnjačka Banja (SRB)	2	0	0	2	50	59	−9	0

4 September 2009	Sassari	28–29	Brühl	(report)

5 September 2009	Vrnjačka Banja	29–30	Sassari	(report)

6 September 2009	Brühl	29–21	Vrnjačka Banja	(report)

==== Group B ====
Team	Pld	W	D	L	GF	GA	GD	Pts
Milli Piyango (TUR)	2	2	0	0	58	53	+5	4
Amsterdam (NED)	2	1	0	1	55	50	+5	2
Madeira (POR)	2	0	0	2	53	63	−10	0

4 September 2009	Amsterdam	23–27	Milli Piyango	(report)

5 September 2009	Madeira	23–32	Amsterdam	(report)

6 September 2009	Milli Piyango	31–30	Madeira	(report)

=== Qualification Tournament 2 ===
Sixteen teams were divided into four groups of four teams each. Twelve losers of the Qualification Tournament 2 entered the EHF Cup at Round 3. The first placed team of each group advanced to the Group Matches.

Byåsen, Zvezda, FCK Håndbold and Aalborg qualified by winning all three matches of their respective groups, with Aalborg being the only host to advance to the next stage. None of the four teams coming from the first qualification tournament won any points.

==== Group 1 ====
Hosted by SPR Lublin SSA in Lublin, Poland.

Team	Pld	W	D	L	GF	GA	GD	Pts
Byåsen (NOR)	3	3	0	0	115	62	+53	6
Lublin (POL)	3	2	0	1	92	75	+17	4
Rulmentul Braşov (ROU)	3	1	0	2	90	108	−18	2
Sassari (ITA)	3	0	0	3	79	131	−52	0

2 October 2009	Rulmentul Braşov	24–30	Lublin	(report)

2 October 2009	Byåsen	45–20	Sassari	(report)

3 October 2009	Sassari	37–43	Rulmentul Braşov	(report)

3 October 2009	Lublin	19–29	Byåsen	(report)

4 October 2009	Rulmentul Braşov	23–41	Byåsen	(report)

4 October 2009	Lublin	43–22	Sassari	(report)

==== Group 2 ====
Hosted by SKP Bratislava in Partizánske, Slovakia.

Team	Pld	W	D	L	GF	GA	GD	Pts
Zvezda (RUS)	3	3	0	0	102	57	+45	6
Olimpija (SLO)	3	2	0	1	79	85	−6	4
Bratislava (SVK)	3	1	0	2	72	86	−14	2
Amsterdam (NED)	3	0	0	3	74	99	−25	0

2 October 2009	Zvezda	33–21	Bratislava	(report)

2 October 2009	Olimpija	33–31	Amsterdam	(report)

3 October 2009	Amsterdam	18–39	Zvezda	(report)

3 October 2009	Bratislava	24–28	Olimpija	(report)

4 October 2009	Zvezda	30–18	Olimpija	(report)

4 October 2009	Bratislava	27–25	Amsterdam	(report)

==== Group 3 ====
Hosted by HC "Smart" in Uzhhorod, Ukraine.

Team	Pld	W	D	L	GF	GA	GD	Pts
FCK Håndbold (DEN)	3	3	0	0	96	55	+41	6
Budapest Bank FTC (HUN)	3	2	0	1	81	76	+5	4
Smart (UKR)	3	1	0	2	70	79	−9	2
Brühl (SUI)	3	0	0	3	61	98	−37	0

2 October 2009	Budapest Bank FTC	27–24	Smart	(report)

2 October 2009	FCK Håndbold	34–19	Brühl	(report)

3 October 2009	Brühl	21–34	Budapest Bank FTC	(report)

3 October 2009	Smart	16–31	FCK Håndbold	(report)

4 October 2009	Budapest Bank FTC	20–31	FCK Håndbold	(report)

4 October 2009	Smart	30–21	Brühl	(report)

==== Group 4 ====
Hosted by Aalborg DH in Aalborg, Denmark.

Team	Pld	W	D	L	GF	GA	GD	Pts
Aalborg (DEN)	3	3	0	0	107	69	+38	6
Sagunto (ESP)	3	2	0	1	91	77	+14	4
Ormi Patras (GRE)	3	1	0	2	66	102	−36	2
Milli Piyango (TUR)	3	0	0	3	74	90	−16	0

2 October 2009	Sagunto	28–25	Milli Piyango	(report)

2 October 2009	Aalborg	40–19	Ormi Patras	(report)

3 October 2009	Ormi Patras	21–37	Sagunto	(report)

3 October 2009	Milli Piyango	24–36	Aalborg	(report)

4 October 2009	Ormi Patras	26–25	Milli Piyango	(report)

4 October 2009	Aalborg	31–26	Sagunto	(report)

== Group Matches ==
Twelve teams, along with four winners of the qualifying rounds, competed in the group matches of the Champions League. There were four groups of four teams each. The first and second placed team of each group advanced to the Main Round. Third placed teams entered the Cup Winners' Cup in Round 4.

The draw for the round took place in Vienna on 24 June 2009 as part of a special event organized by the EHF, the Champions' Draw.

=== Group A ===
Team	Pld	W	D	L	GF	GA	GD	Pts
Viborg (DEN)	6	4	1	1	171	143	+28	9
Leipzig (GER)	6	3	1	2	154	158	−4	7
Byåsen (NOR)	6	2	0	4	153	157	−4	4
Podravka (CRO)	6	2	0	4	172	192	−20	4

24 October 2009	Byåsen	21–26	Viborg	(report)

25 October 2009	Leipzig	35–32	Podravka	(report)

31 October 2009	Podravka	32–31	Byåsen	(report)

31 October 2009	Viborg	33–23	Leipzig	(report)

8 November 2009	Podravka	31–27	Viborg	(report)

8 November 2009	Byåsen	23–22	Leipzig	(report)

14 November 2009	Leipzig	20–20	Viborg	(report)

15 November 2009	Byåsen	34–23	Podravka	(report)

9 January 2010	Viborg	29–22	Byåsen	(report)

9 January 2010	Podravka	28–29	Leipzig	(report)

16 January 2010	Viborg	36–26	Podravka	(report)

17 January 2010	Leipzig	25–22	Byåsen	(report)

=== Group B ===
Team	Pld	W	D	L	GF	GA	GD	Pts
Krim (SLO)	6	5	0	1	201	168	+33	10
Hypo (AUT) (Note: During the last seconds of the match Hypo v Metz, Hypo's coach Gunnar Prokop intentionally invaded the court and stopped a fast break of the French team. The point for Hypo Niederösterreich was deducted by the EHF Arbitration Tribunal. Archived 7 November 2009 at the Wayback Machine)	6	3	1	2	168	168	0	7
Metz (FRA)	6	2	1	3	163	174	−11	5
Aalborg (DEN)	6	1	0	5	156	178	−22	2

24 October 2009	Metz	30–37	Krim	(report)

25 October 2009	Aalborg	30–36	Hypo	(report)

29 October 2009	Hypo	27–27	Metz	(report)

31 October 2009	Krim	30–23	Aalborg	(report)

8 November 2009	Aalborg	31–24	Metz	(report)

8 November 2009	Krim	35–24	Hypo	(report)

14 November 2009	Metz	28–26	Hypo	(report)

15 November 2009	Aalborg	32–38	Krim	(report)

9 January 2009	Hypo	27–22	Aalborg	(report)

9 January 2009	Krim	35–31	Metz	(report)

15 January 2009	Metz	23–18	Aalborg	(report)

15 January 2009	Hypo	28–26	Krim	(report)

=== Group C ===
Team	Pld	W	D	L	GF	GA	GD	Pts
Oltchim Vâlcea (ROU)	6	4	0	2	159	152	+7	8
Győr (HUN)	6	4	0	2	153	149	+4	8
Zvezda (RUS)	6	2	1	3	161	169	−8	5
Itxako (ESP)	6	1	1	4	148	151	−3	3

24 October 2009	Itxako	24–27	Oltchim Vâlcea	(report)

25 October 2009	Zvezda	34–29	Győr	(report)

1 November 2009	Győr	29–28	Itxako	(report)

1 November 2009	Oltchim Vâlcea	31–27	Zvezda	(report)

7 November 2009	Zvezda	25–25	Itxako	(report)

8 November 2009	Oltchim Vâlcea	26–22	Győr	(report)

14 November 2009	Zvezda	27–26	Oltchim Vâlcea	(report)

14 November 2009	Itxako	14–20	Győr	(report)

10 January 2010	Győr	27–25	Zvezda	(report)

10 January 2010	Oltchim Vâlcea	27–26	Itxako	(report)

16 January 2010	Itxako	31–23	Zvezda	(report)

17 January 2010	Győr	26–22	Oltchim Vâlcea	(report)

=== Group D ===
Team	Pld	W	D	L	GF	GA	GD	Pts
Larvik (NOR)	6	4	0	2	147	137	+10	8
Dinamo Volgograd (RUS)	6	3	1	2	147	130	+17	7
Budućnost (MNE)	6	2	1	3	138	155	−17	5
FCK Håndbold (DEN)	6	2	0	4	140	150	−10	4

24 October 2009	Budućnost	23–27	Larvik	(report)

25 October 2009	FCK Håndbold	24–23	Dinamo	(report)

31 October 2009	Larvik	31–26	FCK Håndbold	(report)

1 November 2009	Dinamo	31–18	Budućnost	(report)

8 November 2009	FCK Håndbold	22–25	Budućnost	(report)

8 November 2009	Larvik	18–17	Dinamo	(report)

14 November 2009	Budućnost	24–24	Dinamo	(report)

15 November 2009	FCK Håndbold	23–19	Larvik	(report)

9 January 2010	Dinamo	26–23	FCK Håndbold	(report)

10 January 2010	Larvik	29–22	Budućnost	(report)

16 January 2010	Dinamo	26–23	Larvik	(report)

16 January 2010	Budućnost	26–22	FCK Håndbold	(report)

== Main round ==
The eight teams qualified from the Group Matches were drawn into two groups. Each group contained two winners and two second placed teams, in a way that clubs which had faced each other at Group Matches would not meet again in this round. The first and second placed teams of each group played in the semifinals.

The draw for the round took place in Linz, Austria on 19 January 2010.

=== Group 1 ===
Team	Pld	W	D	L	GF	GA	GD	Pts
Larvik (NOR)	6	5	0	1	170	149	+21	10
Győr (HUN)	6	4	1	1	157	139	+18	9
Krim (SLO)	6	2	1	3	163	166	−3	5
Leipzig (GER)	6	0	0	6	134	170	−36	0

6 February 2010	Győr	25–23	Krim	(report)

7 February 2010	Leipzig	20–23	Larvik	(report)

13 February 2010	Larvik	29–27	Győr	(report)

13 February 2010	Krim	32–26	Leipzig	(report)

19 February 2010	Krim	30–34	Larvik	(report)

21 February 2010	Leipzig	21–23	Győr	(report)

6 March 2010	Győr	28–23	Larvik	(report)

7 March 2010	Leipzig	27–31	Krim	(report)

13–14 March 2010	Larvik	31–21	Leipzig	(report)

13 March 2010	Krim	24–24	Győr	(report)

20 March 2010	Larvik	30–23	Krim	(report)

21 March 2010	Győr	30–19	Leipzig	(report)

=== Group 2 ===
Team	Pld	W	D	L	GF	GA	GD	Pts
Oltchim Vâlcea (ROU)	6	4	1	1	178	168	+10	9
Viborg (DEN)	6	4	0	2	190	171	+19	8
Hypo (AUT)	6	2	0	4	163	182	−19	4
Dinamo (RUS)	6	1	1	4	166	176	−10	3

6 February 2010	Dinamo	29–30	Viborg	(report)

6 February 2010	Hypo	26–31	Oltchim Vâlcea	(report)

13 February 2010	Viborg	35–26	Hypo	(report)

14 February 2010	Oltchim Vâlcea	30–24	Dinamo	(report)

20 February 2010	Dinamo	27–21	Hypo	(report)

21 February 2010	Oltchim Vâlcea	27–26	Viborg	(report)

6 March 2010	Dinamo	32–32	Oltchim Vâlcea	(report)

6 March 2010	Hypo	35–31	Viborg	(report)

13 March 2010	Viborg	35–28	Dinamo	(report)

14 March 2010	Oltchim Vâlcea	32–27	Hypo	(report)

19 March 2010	Hypo	28–26	Dinamo	(report)

20 March 2010	Viborg	33–26	Oltchim Vâlcea	(report)

== Final round ==
The semifinals and finals were played in two legs of home and away matches. Larvik and Oltchim had home court advantage for the second leg of the semifinals as winners of their respective groups.

After Viborg and Oltchim had secured their advance to the finals, the EHF announced that the home rights for those matches would be drawn on 20 April in Vienna. As a result of the draw, Viborg won home rights for the first leg and Oltchim for the second. To comply with EHF regulations about arenas' capacity, the matches were not played at the usual home ground of the clubs. The first leg took place on 8 May in Messecenter, Herning, while the second leg were played on 15 May at Sala Polivalentă, Bucharest.

Semifinals
1	Viborg HK (DEN)	27	26	53
4	Larvik HK (NOR)	21	27	48
3	Győri Audi ETO KC (HUN)	25	20	45
2	Oltchim Vâlcea (ROU)	25	24	49

Final
Viborg HK (DEN)	28	32	60
Oltchim Vâlcea (ROU)	21	31	52

=== Semifinals ===
10 April 2010; 21:15 (UTC+2)	Viborg HK	27–21	Larvik HK	Viborg Stadionhal, Viborg; Attendance: 2,400; Referees: Raluy, Sabroso (ESP)
10 April 2010; 21:15 (UTC+2)	Mikkelsen 6	(13–13)	Sulland 8	Viborg Stadionhal, Viborg; Attendance: 2,400; Referees: Raluy, Sabroso (ESP)
10 April 2010; 21:15 (UTC+2)	3× (yellow card) 3× (suspension)	Report	2× (yellow card) 2× (suspension)	Viborg Stadionhal, Viborg; Attendance: 2,400; Referees: Raluy, Sabroso (ESP)

11 April 2010; 17:15 (UTC+2)	Győri Audi ETO KC	25–25	SC Oltchim Râmnicu Vâlcea	Magvassy Mihály Sports Hall, Győr; Attendance: 2,800; Referees: Lazaar, Reveret (FRA)
11 April 2010; 17:15 (UTC+2)	Amorim 6	(14–15)	Pușcașu 5	Magvassy Mihály Sports Hall, Győr; Attendance: 2,800; Referees: Lazaar, Reveret (FRA)
11 April 2010; 17:15 (UTC+2)	3× (yellow card) 2× (suspension)	Report	3× (yellow card) 3× (suspension)	Magvassy Mihály Sports Hall, Győr; Attendance: 2,800; Referees: Lazaar, Reveret (FRA)

17 April 2010; 14:45 (UTC+2)	Larvik HK	27–26	Viborg HK	Arena Larvik, Larvik; Attendance: 2,500; Referees: Hakansson, Nilsson (SWE)
17 April 2010; 14:45 (UTC+2)	Althaus 7	(10–13)	Mørk 8	Arena Larvik, Larvik; Attendance: 2,500; Referees: Hakansson, Nilsson (SWE)
17 April 2010; 14:45 (UTC+2)	3× (yellow card) 2× (suspension)	Report	1× (yellow card) 6× (suspension)	Arena Larvik, Larvik; Attendance: 2,500; Referees: Hakansson, Nilsson (SWE)

18 April 2010; 17:15 (UTC+3)	SC Oltchim Râmnicu Vâlcea	24–20	Győri Audi ETO KC	Sala Sporturilor "Traian", Râmnicu Vâlcea; Attendance: 3,000; Referees: Pedersen, Mortensen (DEN)
18 April 2010; 17:15 (UTC+3)	Nechita 7	(11–10)	Görbicz 6	Sala Sporturilor "Traian", Râmnicu Vâlcea; Attendance: 3,000; Referees: Pedersen, Mortensen (DEN)
18 April 2010; 17:15 (UTC+3)	3× (yellow card) 4× (suspension)	Report	3× (yellow card) 3× (suspension)	Sala Sporturilor "Traian", Râmnicu Vâlcea; Attendance: 3,000; Referees: Pedersen, Mortensen (DEN)

=== Final ===
8 May 2010; 16:15 (UTC+2)	Viborg HK	28–21	SC Oltchim Râmnicu Vâlcea	Messecenter Herning, Herning; Attendance: 4,000; Referees: Nikolic, Stojkovic (SRB)
8 May 2010; 16:15 (UTC+2)	Popović 9	(14–11)	Neagu, Stanca 6	Messecenter Herning, Herning; Attendance: 4,000; Referees: Nikolic, Stojkovic (SRB)
8 May 2010; 16:15 (UTC+2)	3× (yellow card) 8× (suspension) 1× (red card)	Report	3× (yellow card) 5× (suspension)	Messecenter Herning, Herning; Attendance: 4,000; Referees: Nikolic, Stojkovic (SRB)

15 May 2010; 20:45 (UTC+3)	SC Oltchim Râmnicu Vâlcea	31–32	Viborg HK	Sala Polivalentă, Bucharest; Attendance: 4,700; Referees: Dentz, Reibel (FRA)
15 May 2010; 20:45 (UTC+3)	Pidpalova 10	(15–16)	Jurack 11	Sala Polivalentă, Bucharest; Attendance: 4,700; Referees: Dentz, Reibel (FRA)
15 May 2010; 20:45 (UTC+3)	3× (yellow card) 4× (suspension)	Report	3× (yellow card) 7× (suspension)	Sala Polivalentă, Bucharest; Attendance: 4,700; Referees: Dentz, Reibel (FRA)

EHF Champions League
2009/10 Winners

Viborg HK
Third Title

== Top scorers ==
As published by the EHF

Rank	Name	Club	Goals
1	Cristina Vărzaru	Viborg HK	101
2	Alexandra do Nascimento	Hypo Niederösterreich	98
3	Anna Kochetova	HC Dinamo	84
3	Bojana Popović	Viborg HK	84
5	Heidi Løke	Larvik HK	80
6	Rikke Skov	Viborg HK	73
7	Linn Jørum Sulland	Larvik HK	68
8	Andrea Lekić	RK Krim	66
9	Olga Levina	HC Dinamo	65
9	Cristina Neagu	SC Oltchim Râmnicu Vâlcea	65
11	Eduarda Amorim	Győri Audi ETO KC	64
12	Henriette Mikkelsen	Viborg HK	63
12	Szandra Zácsik	RK Krim	63
14	Ramona Maier	SC Oltchim Râmnicu Vâlcea	62
15	Ionela Stanca	SC Oltchim Râmnicu Vâlcea	60
16	Nora Mørk	Larvik HK	58
17	Daniela Piedade	Hypo Niederösterreich	54
18	Aurelia Brădeanu	Győri Audi ETO KC	52
19	Anikó Kovacsics	Győri Audi ETO KC	51
20	Andrea Penezić	Podravka Koprivnica	49
20	Patricia Vizitiu	SC Oltchim Râmnicu Vâlcea	49
22	Karolina Kudłacz	HC Leipzig	45
22	Orsolya Vérten	Győri Audi ETO KC	45
24	Anja Althaus	Viborg HK	44
25	Tatiana Khmyrova	HC Dinamo	43
