= Florentin Pera =

Romanian handball manager (born 1979)

Personal information
- Full name: Florentin Constantin Pera
- Born: 18 November 1979 (age 46) Reșița, Romania

Sport
- Sport: Handball
- Current club: SCM Râmnicu Vâlcea (manager)

Teams managed
- Years: Team
- 2018–2021: SCM Râmnicu Vâlcea
- 2021–2022: CSKA Moscow
- 2022–2025: Romania
- 2023–2025: Gloria Bistrița
- 2025–: SCM Râmnicu Vâlcea

Florentin-Constantin Pera (born 18 November 1979) is a Romanian professional handball manager and former player. He was the manager of the Romania national team from 2022 to 2025.

== Trophies ==
=== Manager ===
SCM Râmnicu Vâlcea

- Liga Națională: 2019
- Cupa României: 2020
- Supercupa României: 2018, 2020
