= Roxana Gatzel =

Romanian handball player (born 1980)

Personal information
- Nationality: Romanian
- Born: 28 May 1980 (age 46) Craiova, România
- Height: 1.71 m (5 ft 7 in)

Sport
- Sport: Handball
- Position: Middle back
- Current club: CS Măgura Cisnădie
- Number: 80

Senior clubs
- Years: Team
- 1997-2001: CS Oltchim
- 2001-2006: HC Zalău
- 2006-2012: CS Oltchim
- 2012-2014: SCM Craiova
- 2014-: CS Măgura Cisnădie
National team
Years	Team	Apps	(Gls)
2004-2010	Romania	89	(167)
Medal record
Junior European Championship
Gold medal – first place	1998 Slovakia	Team
Junior World Championship
Gold medal – first place	1999 China	Team
World Championship
Silver medal – second place	2005 Russia	Team
European Championship
Bronze medal – third place	2010 Denmark & Norway	Team
- Updated on 7 December 2010

Roxana Gatzel (former Han; born 28 May 1980) is a Romanian handball player. She plays for the Romanian club CS Măgura Cisnădie.

== Individual awards ==
- Romanian National League Top Scorer: 2016
