= SCM Râmnicu Vâlcea (handball) =

Professional handball club in Râmnicu Vâlcea, Romania

- Full name: Sport Club Municipal Râmnicu Vâlcea
- Short name: SCM or Vâlcea
- Founded: 26 June 1973; 53 years ago, as AS Chimistul Râmnicu Vâlcea
- Arena: Traian
- Capacity: 2,239
- President: (Romania) Florin Verigeanu
- Head coach: (Romania) Florentin Pera
- League: Liga Naţională
- 2025-26: Liga Naţională, 4th of 12
- Club colours
Home	Away

SCM Râmnicu Vâlcea, formerly known as CS Oltchim Râmnicu Vâlcea, is a professional women's handball club in Râmnicu Vâlcea, Romania, that competes in the Liga Naţională and the EHF European League.

It holds the record of CS Oltchim Râmnicu Vâlcea since 26 April 2019, this means SCM Râmnicu Vâlcea is the successor club. The board also plans to get the name in the future.

Location of SCM Râmnicu Vâlcea

== Kits ==
HOME
2014–15	2016–17	2017–18	2018–19	2019–20	2020-

AWAY
2014–15	2015-16	2016–17	2017–19	2019–20	2020–

THIRD
2019–20	2020–

== Honours ==
=== League ===
- Liga Națională
  - Champions (20): 1989, 1990, 1991, 1993, 1994, 1995, 1996, 1997, 1998, 1999, 2000, 2002, 2007, 2008, 2009, 2010, 2011, 2012, 2013, 2019
  - Runners-up (5): 1983, 1985, 1992, 2001, 2003
  - Third place (7): 1984, 1986, 1988, 2005, 2006, 2021, 2022

==== Cup ====
- Cupa României
  - Winners (14): 1984, 1990, 1992, 1993, 1994, 1995, 1996, 1997, 1998, 1999, 2001, 2002, 2007, 2011, 2020
  - Runners-up (6): 1986, 2003, 2006, 2018, 2019, 2022
  - Third place (3): 1987, 1988, 1989
- Supercupa României
  - Winners (4): 2007, 2011, 2018, 2020
  - Runners-up (1): 2019

=== European ===
- EHF Champions League
  - Runners-up (1): 2010
  - Third place (5): 1990, 1992, 2009, 2012, 2013
- EHF Champions Trophy
  - Winners (1): 2007
- EHF Super Cup
  - Winners (1): 1984
- EHF Cup
  - Winners (2): 1984, 1989
- EHF Cup Winners' Cup
  - Winners (1): 2007
  - Runners-up (1): 2002
  - Third place (5): 1987, 1993

== Kit manufacturers and sponsors ==
Kit manufacturer	Major sponsors
Hummel	Volkswagen / Strabag / Chimcomplex / Fitzerman Pharma / Boromir / Râureni / Anabella / Diana / Securitas / Farmaciile Băjan / Damila D / Biborteni

== In European competitions ==
EHF / IHF competitions
Season	Competition	Pld	W	D	L	GF	GA	Diff	Final result
1973–74 – 1982–83	—	—	—	—	—	—	—	—	Did not participate
1983–84	IHF Cup	—	—	—	—	—	—	—	Winners
1984–85	European Champions Cup	—	—	—	—	—	—	—	To be confirmed
1985–86	IHF Cup	—	—	—	—	—	—	—	To be confirmed
1986–87	IHF Cup	—	—	—	—	—	—	—	To be confirmed
1987–88	—	—	—	—	—	—	—	—	Did not participate
1988–89	IHF Cup	—	—	—	—	—	—	—	Winners
1989–90	European Champions Cup	—	—	—	—	—	—	—	To be confirmed
1990–91	European Champions Cup	—	—	—	—	—	—	—	To be confirmed
1991–92	European Champions Cup	4	2	0	2	117	107	+10	Quarter-finals
1992–93	EHF Cup	—	—	—	—	—	—	—	To be confirmed
1993–94	EHF Champions League	—	—	—	—	—	—	—	To be confirmed
1994–95	EHF Champions League	—	—	—	—	—	—	—	To be confirmed
1995–96	EHF Champions League	—	—	—	—	—	—	—	To be confirmed
1996–97	EHF Champions League	—	—	—	—	—	—	—	To be confirmed
1997–98	EHF Champions League	—	—	—	—	—	—	—	Group stage
1998–99	EHF Champions League	—	—	—	—	—	—	—	Group stage
1999–2000	EHF Champions League	—	—	—	—	—	—	—	To be confirmed
2000–01	EHF Champions League	8	4	0	4	197	190	+7	Group stage
2001–02	Cup Winners' Cup	10	7	1	2	294	244	+50	Finalist
2002–03	EHF Champions League	4	2	0	2	132	99	+33	Qualification Round 2
2002–03	EHF Cup	6	4	0	2	167	151	+16	Quarter-finals
2003–04	EHF Cup	4	2	0	2	116	83	+33	Round 3
2004–05	Challenge Cup	4	3	0	1	132	115	+17	Quarter-finals
2005–06	EHF Cup	2	1	0	1	51	57	-6	Round 3
2006–07	Cup Winners' Cup	12	10	2	0	413	283	+130	Winners
2006–07	Champions Trophy	2	2	0	0	54	42	+12	Winners
2007–08	EHF Champions League	17	12	1	4	537	420	+117	Semi-finals
2008–09	EHF Champions League	14	8	1	5	—	—	—	Semi-finals
2009–10	EHF Champions League	16	10	2	4	463	421	+42	Finalist
2010–11	EHF Champions League	12	6	0	6	347	322	+25	Main round
2011–12	EHF Champions League	14	9	1	4	392	347	+45	Semi-finals
2012–13	EHF Champions League	—	—	—	—	—	—	—	Semi-finals
2013–14 – 2014–15	—	—	—	—	—	—	—	—	Did not participate; club dissolved
2015–16 – 2017–18	—	—	—	—	—	—	—	—	Did not participate
2018–19	EHF Cup	4	1	0	3	90	90	0	Qualification Round 3
2019–20	EHF Champions League	12	4	1	7	307	310	-3	Quarter-finals (season cancelled)
2020–21	EHF Champions League	13	5	0	8	304	353	-49	Play-offs
2021–22	EHF European League	10	6	1	3	302	299	+3	Quarter-finals
2022–23	EHF European League	10	6	1	3	307	293	+14	Quarter-finals
2023–24	—	—	—	—	—	—	—	—	Did not participate
2024–25	EHF European League	12	9	1	2	380	359	+21	Quarter-finals
2025–26	—	—	—	—	—	—	—	—	Did not participate
2026–27	—	—	—	—	—	—	—	—	To be confirmed
Total		190	113	12	65	5102+	4585+	+517+	2 IHF Cup titles; 1 Cup Winners' Cup title; 1 Champions Trophy title; 1 Champions League finalist; 1 EHF Cup / European League quarter-finals record for successor club

Pld – Played; W – Won; D – Drawn; L – Lost; GF – Goals for; GA – Goals against; Diff – Difference.
Oltchim Râmnicu Vâlcea was dissolved in 2013. Later European records belong to SCM Râmnicu Vâlcea, the successor club, and should be listed separately.

=== European record ===
Season	Competition	Round	Club	Home	Away	Aggregate
1983–84	IHF Cup; Winner	Quarter-finals	(Netherlands) Swift Roermond	32–16	24–21	56–37
1983–84	IHF Cup; Winner	Semi-finals	(Hungary) Budapesti Spartacus	28–21	23–21	51–42
1983–84	IHF Cup; Winner	Final	(West Germany) VfL Oldenburg	22–18	29–21	51–39; Winner
1984–85	European Champions Cup	To be confirmed	To be confirmed	To be confirmed	To be confirmed	To be confirmed
1985–86	IHF Cup	To be confirmed	To be confirmed	To be confirmed	To be confirmed	To be confirmed
1986–87	IHF Cup	To be confirmed	To be confirmed	To be confirmed	To be confirmed	To be confirmed
1987–88	—	Did not participate	—	—	—	—
1988–89	IHF Cup; Winner	Semi-finals	(Hungary) Budapesti Spartacus	34–25	26–29	60–54
1988–89	IHF Cup; Winner	Final	To be confirmed	To be confirmed	To be confirmed	IHF Cup winners
1989–90	European Champions Cup	To be confirmed	To be confirmed	To be confirmed	To be confirmed	To be confirmed
1990–91	European Champions Cup	To be confirmed	To be confirmed	To be confirmed	To be confirmed	To be confirmed
1991–92	European Champions Cup	First round	(Netherlands) HV Aalsmeer	40–29	31–24	71–53
1991–92	European Champions Cup	Quarter-finals	(Sweden) Irsta HF	33–28	25–27	58–55
1991–92	European Champions Cup	Semi-finals	(Austria) Hypo Niederösterreich	22–32	34–40	56–72
1992–93	EHF Cup	To be confirmed	To be confirmed	To be confirmed	To be confirmed	To be confirmed
1993–94	Champions League	To be confirmed	To be confirmed	To be confirmed	To be confirmed	To be confirmed
1994–95	Champions League	To be confirmed	To be confirmed	To be confirmed	To be confirmed	To be confirmed
1995–96	Champions League	1/16-finals	(Turkey) TMO Ankara	30–14	35–15	65–29
1995–96	Champions League	1/8-finals	(Austria) SG WAT Fünfhaus	32–18	33–16	65–34
1995–96	Champions League	Group stage (Group B)	(Hungary) Ferencváros Budapest	26–26	23–29	
1995–96	Champions League	Group stage (Group B)	(Austria) Hypo Niederösterreich	17–30	18–23	
1995–96	Champions League	Group stage (Group B)	(Denmark) Viborg HK	17–21	21–35	
1996–97	Champions League	1/16-finals	(Slovakia) Slovan Duslo Šaľa	33–16	29–22	62–38
1996–97	Champions League	Group stage (Group C)	(Austria) Hypo Niederösterreich	18–19	21–29	
1996–97	Champions League	Group stage (Group C)	(Norway) Byåsen Trondheim	24–16	20–25	
1996–97	Champions League	Group stage (Group C)	(France) ASPTT Metz	24–24	20–20	
1997–98	Champions League	1/16-finals	(Belgium) Handball Fémina Visé	38–16	32–18	70–34
1997–98	Champions League	Group stage (Group D)	(Denmark) Viborg HK	22–19	23–24	
1997–98	Champions League	Group stage (Group D)	(Austria) Hypo Niederösterreich	17–18	26–20	
1997–98	Champions League	Group stage (Group D)	(Italy) Jomsa Rimini	30–21	20–22	
1998–99	Champions League	1/16-finals	(Russia) Istochnik Rostov	26–21	20–23	46–44
1998–99	Champions League	Group stage (Group C)	(Hungary) Dunaferr SE	21–24	23–24	
1998–99	Champions League	Group stage (Group C)	(Austria) Hypo Niederösterreich	25–19	24–32	
1998–99	Champions League	Group stage (Group C)	(Greece) GAS Anagennisi Artas	32–24	29–34	
1999–2000	Champions League	1/16-finals	(Russia) Volgograd AKVA	19–22	26–26	45–48
2000–01	Champions League	Round 2	(Croatia) Podravka Koprivnica	21–19	19–18	40–37
2000–01	Champions League	Group stage (Group C)	(Norway) Larvik HK	19–24	16–22	
2000–01	Champions League	Group stage (Group C)	(Denmark) Viborg HK	25–24	27–30	
2000–01	Champions League	Group stage (Group C)	(Greece) GAS Anagennisi Artas	39–29	33–21	
2001–02	Cup Winners' Cup; Finalist	Round 3	(Czech Republic) HC Novesta Zlín	27–20	25–25	52–45
2001–02	Cup Winners' Cup; Finalist	Round 4	(Ukraine) Spartak Kiev	35–24	34–23	69–47
2001–02	Cup Winners' Cup; Finalist	Quarter-finals	(Croatia) ŽRK Koka Varaždin	31–25	31–19	62–44
2001–02	Cup Winners' Cup; Finalist	Semi-finals	(Spain) Alsa Elda Prestigio	30–23	23–26	53–49
2001–02	Cup Winners' Cup; Finalist	Final	(Russia) Lada Togliatti	32–27	20–28	52–55; Finalist
2002–03	Champions League	Qualification round 1	(Bosnia and Herzegovina) HZRK Zrinjski Mostar	53–17	34–18	87–35
2002–03	Champions League	Qualification round 2	(Norway) Nordstrand 2000 Oslo	24–22	21–32	45–54
2002–03	EHF Cup	Round 3	(Socialist Federal Republic of Yugoslavia) Jugopetrol Radnički Beograd	34–22	29–26	63–48
2002–03	EHF Cup	Round 4	(Croatia) H.C. Sonic Osijek	22–17	32–24	54–41
2002–03	EHF Cup	Quarter-finals	(Denmark) Slagelse FH	27–31	23–31	50–62
2003–04	EHF Cup	Round 2	(Bosnia and Herzegovina) HZRK Zrinjski Mostar	35–15	34–14	69–29
2003–04	EHF Cup	Round 3	(Hungary) Győri Graboplast ETO	21–25	26–29	47–54
2004–05	Challenge Cup	1/8-finals	(Switzerland) Spono Nottwil Handball	28–22	40–28	68–50
2004–05	Challenge Cup	Quarter-finals	(Germany) BSV Buxtehude	36–34	28–31	64–65
2005–06	EHF Cup	Round 3	(Spain) Cementos La Unión-Ribarroja	27–25	24–32	51–57
2006–07	Cup Winners' Cup; Winner	Round 2	(Belgium) DHW Antwerpen	47–14	47–11	94–25
2006–07	Cup Winners' Cup; Winner	Round 3	(Hungary) Cornexi Alcoa-HSB Holding	40–23	25–25	65–48
2006–07	Cup Winners' Cup; Winner	Round 4	(Germany) 1. FC Nürnberg	31–26	29–27	60–53
2006–07	Cup Winners' Cup; Winner	Quarter-finals	(Croatia) Podravka Koprivnica	34–21	27–32	61–53
2006–07	Cup Winners' Cup; Winner	Semi-finals	(Hungary) Budapest Bank-FTC	36–23	28–27	64–50
2006–07	Cup Winners' Cup; Winner	Final	(Norway) Byåsen HB Elite Trondheim	29–29	30–24	59–53; Winner
2006–07	Champions Trophy; Winner	Final round	(Russia) Lada Togliatti	31–23	—	31–23
2006–07	Champions Trophy; Winner	Final round	(Russia) Zvezda Zvenigorod	23–19	—	Champions Trophy winners
2007–08	Champions League	Qualification tournament 2 (Group 3)	(Portugal) Madeira Andebol SAD	35–20	—	
2007–08	Champions League	Qualification tournament 2 (Group 3)	(Belarus) BNTU-Belaz Minsk Reg.	39–13	—	
2007–08	Champions League	Qualification tournament 2 (Group 3)	(Norway) Byåsen HB Elite	30–22	—	Qualified
2007–08	Champions League	Group matches (Group D)	(Denmark) Viborg HK	33–30	31–29	1st
2007–08	Champions League	Group matches (Group D)	(Hungary) Budapest Bank-FTC	34–28	32–22	
2007–08	Champions League	Group matches (Group D)	(Montenegro) Budućnost T-Mobile	35–22	32–21	
2007–08	Champions League	Main round (Group 1)	(Germany) 1. FC Nürnberg	39–27	28–28	3rd
2007–08	Champions League	Main round (Group 1)	(Russia) Lada Togliatti	35–26	27–30	
2007–08	Champions League	Main round (Group 1)	(Hungary) Győri Audi ETO KC	32–27	27–30	
2008–09	Champions League	Group matches (Group C)	(Norway) Larvik HK	33–29	27–25	2nd
2008–09	Champions League	Group matches (Group C)	(Russia) HC Lada	30–19	33–34	
2008–09	Champions League	Group matches (Group C)	(Croatia) HC Podravka Vegeta	24–28	30–20	
2008–09	Champions League	Main round (Group 2)	(Montenegro) Budućnost T-Mobile	31–22	22–23	2nd
2008–09	Champions League	Main round (Group 2)	(Slovenia) RK Krim Mercator	36–30	34–35	
2008–09	Champions League	Main round (Group 2)	(Hungary) Győri Audi ETO KC	28–26	28–30	
2008–09	Champions League	Semi-finals	(Denmark) Viborg HK	28–34	21–21	49–55
2009–10	Champions League; Finalist	Group matches (Group C)	(Spain) S.D. Itxako	27–26	27–24	1st
2009–10	Champions League; Finalist	Group matches (Group C)	(Russia) Zvezda Zvenigorod	31–27	26–27	
2009–10	Champions League; Finalist	Group matches (Group C)	(Hungary) Győri Audi ETO KC	26–22	22–26	
2009–10	Champions League; Finalist	Main round (Group 2)	(Austria) Hypo Niederösterreich	32–27	31–26	1st
2009–10	Champions League; Finalist	Main round (Group 2)	(Russia) HC Dinamo	30–24	32–32	
2009–10	Champions League; Finalist	Main round (Group 2)	(Denmark) Viborg HK	27–26	26–33	
2009–10	Champions League; Finalist	Semi-finals	(Hungary) Győri Audi ETO KC	24–20	25–25	49–45
2009–10	Champions League; Finalist	Final	(Denmark) Viborg HK	31–32	21–28	52–60; Finalist
2010–11	Champions League	Group matches (Group C)	(Denmark) Randers HK	28–22	23–27	2nd
2010–11	Champions League	Group matches (Group C)	(France) Toulon Saint-Cyr Var Handball	28–19	26–22	
2010–11	Champions League	Group matches (Group C)	(Norway) Larvik HK	33–28	31–34	
2010–11	Champions League	Main round (Group 1)	(Montenegro) Budućnost	21–20	21–32	4th
2010–11	Champions League	Main round (Group 1)	(Spain) Itxako Reyno de Navarra	22–25	25–26	
2010–11	Champions League	Main round (Group 1)	(Slovenia) RK Krim Mercator	31–27	30–37	
2011–12	Champions League; Semi-finalist	Group matches (Group D)	(Germany) Buxtehuder SV	28–22	24–20	2nd
2011–12	Champions League; Semi-finalist	Group matches (Group D)	(Russia) Dinamo Volgograd	31–26	30–34	
2011–12	Champions League; Semi-finalist	Group matches (Group D)	(Spain) Itxako Navarra	25–22	25–22	
2011–12	Champions League; Semi-finalist	Main round (Group 2)	(Slovenia) RK Krim Mercator	30–26	31–25	2nd
2011–12	Champions League; Semi-finalist	Main round (Group 2)	(France) Metz Handball	30–21	26–26	
2011–12	Champions League; Semi-finalist	Main round (Group 2)	(Montenegro) Budućnost	24–34	25–31	
2011–12	Champions League; Semi-finalist	Semi-finals	(Hungary) Győri Audi ETO KC	35–31	23–31	58–62
2012–13	Champions League; Semi-finalist	Group matches (Group A)	(Austria) Hypo Niederösterreich	30–25	25–24	1st
2012–13	Champions League; Semi-finalist	Group matches (Group A)	(Germany) Buxtehuder SV	30–22	34–15	
2012–13	Champions League; Semi-finalist	Group matches (Group A)	(Denmark) Randers HK	27–23	24–20	
2012–13	Champions League; Semi-finalist	Main round (Group 2)	(Hungary) FTC-Rail Cargo Hungaria	22–23	30–23	2nd
2012–13	Champions League; Semi-finalist	Main round (Group 2)	(Slovenia) RK Krim Mercator	23–20	24–28	
2012–13	Champions League; Semi-finalist	Main round (Group 2)	(Russia) Zvezda Zvenigorod	29–25	26–23	
2012–13	Champions League; Semi-finalist	Semi-finals	(Hungary) Győri Audi ETO KC	22–24	25–24	47–48
2018–19	EHF Cup	Qualification round 2	(Turkey) Kastamonu Belediyesi GSK	35–26	20–21	55–47
2018–19	EHF Cup	Qualification round 3	(Denmark) Herning-Ikast Håndbold	16–22	19–21	35–43
2019–20	Champions League	Group / Main round	To be completed	—	—	Quarter-finals cancelled
2019–20	Champions League	Quarter-finals	(France) Metz Handball	Cancelled	Cancelled	Cancelled
2020–21	Champions League	Group phase	(France) Brest Bretagne Handball	10–0	21–28	
2020–21	Champions League	Group phase	(Denmark) Odense Håndbold	21–30	26–25	
2020–21	Champions League	Group phase	(Russia) CSKA	24–34	20–30	
2020–21	Champions League	Group phase	(Montenegro) Budućnost	25–23	28–29	
2020–21	Champions League	Group phase	(Croatia) HC Podravka Vegeta	—	27–25	
2020–21	Champions League	Group phase	(Hungary) Győri Audi ETO KC	20–37	31–38	
2020–21	Champions League	Play-offs	(Romania) CSM București	24–33	27–21	51–54
2021–22	European League	Qualification round 3	(Spain) Super Amara Bera Bera	34–28	29–27	63–55
2021–22	European League	Group phase	(Hungary) Váci NKSE	39–29	31–30	
2021–22	European League	Group phase	(France) Chambray Touraine Handball	32–27	26–25	
2021–22	European League	Group phase	(Denmark) Viborg HK	30–30	20–31	
2021–22	European League	Quarter-finals	(Denmark) Herning-Ikast Håndbold	33–39	28–33	61–72
2022–23	European League	Group phase	(Hungary) Praktiker-Vác	40–30	28–26	
2022–23	European League	Group phase	(France) Paris 92	30–28	22–24	
2022–23	European League	Group phase	(Germany) Thüringer HC	32–32	31–38	
2022–23	European League	Quarter-finals	(Denmark) Nykøbing Falster	32–29	29–38	61–67
2024–25	European League	Qualification round 2	(Slovakia) HC DAC Dunajská Streda	28–26	33–26	61–52
2024–25	European League	Qualification round 3	(Hungary) DVSC Schaeffler	33–31	31–28	64–59
2024–25	European League	Group phase	(Germany) BV Borussia Dortmund	32–27	31–31	
2024–25	European League	Group phase	(Norway) Sola HK	32–29	38–34	
2024–25	European League	Group phase	(Denmark) Ikast Håndbold	27–26	34–36	
2024–25	European League	Quarter-finals	(Germany) Thüringer HC	32–30	29–35	61–65
2026–27	—	To be confirmed	—	—	—	—

Green – Win; Yellow – Draw; Red – Lost.
2010–11 to 2012–13 refers to Oltchim Râmnicu Vâlcea. From 2018–19 onward the entries refer to SCM Râmnicu Vâlcea.

== Team ==
=== Current squad ===
Squad for the season 2026/27

Goalkeepers

- 33 (Romania) Medeea Vega
- 55 (Norway) June Krogh
- 94 (Croatia) Gabrijela Bartulović
- 88 (Romania) Sarra Constantin

Wingers
LW

- 19 (Netherlands) Zoë Sprengers
- 22 (Romania) Cristina Florica
- 79 (Romania) Anamaria Stroie

RW

- 4 (Norway) Tuva Høve
- 9 (Netherlands) Sarah Dekker

Line players

- 6 (Romania) Asma Elghaoui
- 18 (Denmark) Maria Lykkegaard
- 77 (Brazil) Tamires Morena

Back players

LB

- 3 (Norway) Emilie Hegh Arntzen
- 24 (Romania) Ștefania Stoica
- 26 (Romania) Andreea Vega
- 98 (Brazil) Larissa da Silva Nascimento

CB

- 7 (France) Grace Zaadi
- 10 (Netherlands) Inger Smits
- 11 (Denmark) Amalie Wulff

RB

- 25 (France) Marie-Hélène Sajka

Squad information
No.	Nat.	Player	Position	Date of birth	In	Contract until
3	(Norway)	Emilie Hegh Arntzen	Left back	01 January 1994	2026	2028
4	(Norway)	Tuva Høve	Right wing	11 June 2000	2025	2028
6	(Romania) (Tunisia)	Asma Elghaoui	Line player	29 August 1991	2019	2027
7	(France)	Grace Zaadi	Center Back	07 July 1993	2026	2028
9	(Netherlands)	Sarah Dekker	Right wing	08 March 2001	2026	2028
10	(Netherlands)	Inger Smits	Center back	17 September 1994	2026	2028
11	(Denmark)	Amalie Wulff	Center back	18 May 1999	2025	2027
18	(Denmark)	Maria Lykkegaard	Line player	27 february 1996	2025	2028
19	(Netherlands)	Zoe Sprengers	Left wing	19 January 2000	2026	2028
22	(Romania)	Cristina Florica	Left wing	11 May 1992	2018	2027
24	(Romania)	Ștefania Stoica	Left back	24 August 2003	2026	2028
25	(France)	Marie-Hélène Sajka	Right back	13 September 1997	2026	2028
55	(Norway)	June Krogh	Goalkeeper	02 December 2003	2026	2029
77	(Brazil)	Tamires Morena	Line player	16 May 1994	2026	2028
79	(Romania)	Anamaria Stroie	Left wing	17 November 2000		
94	(Croatia)	Gabrijela Bartulović	Goalkeeper	06 December 1994	2025	2027
98	(Brazil)	Larissa da Silva Nascimento	Left back	03 August 1998	2026	2028

=== Transfers ===
Transfers for the season 2027-28

Joining

Leaving

- (Romania) Raluca Kelemen (GK) (to (Romania) CSM Slatina) (with immediate effect)
- (Germany) Julia Maidhof (RB) (with immediate effect) (maternity leave)
- (Romania) Cristina Florica(LW) (retires)

=== Staff members ===
- (Romania) President: Florin Verigeanu
- (Romania) Communication delegate: Alexandru Nițișor
- (Romania) Head Coach: Florentin Pera
- (Romania) Assistant coach: Mihai Rohozneanu
- (Serbia) Goalkeeping Coach: Nenad Damjanovic
- (Romania) Fitness Coach: Marian Crăciun
- (Romania) Masseur: Andrei Bularga, Robert Tănăsescu
- (Romania) Doctor: Carmen Udrea
- (Romania) Physiotherapist: Emil Guiu

=== Individual awards in EHF competitions ===
Awards in EHF Champions League

Season	Player	Award	Result
2019–20	(Tunisia) (Hungary) Asma Elghaoui	All-Star Team (Best Line player)	Won

Awards in European competitions

The EHF Excellence Awards, first introduced for the 2022/23 season, honour the best players – both male and female – in each playing position.

Season	Organization	Player	Category	Result
2022-23	European Handball Federation	(Tunisia) (Hungary) Asma Elghaoui	All-Star Team (Best Line player)	Nominated

NOTE: since December 2024 the Tunisian born handball player Asma Elghaoui holds also Romanian citizenship.

== Notable former players ==
=== Retired numbers ===
SCM Râmnicu Vâlcea retired numbers
N°	Nationality	Player	Position	Tenure
23	(Ukraine)	Iryna Glibko posthumous honor	Left back	2017-2024

=== Goalkeepers ===
- (Romania) Mihaela Ciobanu
- (Romania) Ildiko Barbu
- (Romania) Luminița Dinu-Huțupan
- (Romania) Tereza Pîslaru
- (Romania) Talida Tolnai
- (Romania) Paula Ungureanu
- (Romania) Mihaela Băbeanu
- (Romania) Diana Ciucă
- (Romania) Iulia Dumanska
- (Romania) Daciana Hosu
- (Spain) Silvia Navarro
- (Germany) Isabell Roch
- (Montenegro) Marta Batinović
- (France) Amandine Leynaud
- (Ukraine) Tetyana Vorozhtsova
- (Croatia) Sanela Knezović
- (Austria) Petra Blazek

=== Left wings ===
- (Romania) Valentina Ardean-Elisei
- (Romania) Ramona Farcău
- (Romania) Iulia Curea
- (Romania) Ana Maria Iuganu
- (Romania) Corina Lupei
- (Denmark) Ann Grete Nørgaard
- (Norway) Anniken Wollik
- (Sweden) Elin Hansson
- (Ukraine) Olena Radchenko

=== Right wings ===
- (Romania) Adriana Nechita
- (Romania) Cristina Vărzaru
- (Romania) Nicoleta Alexandrescu
- (Romania) Elena Avădanii
- (Romania) Alexandra Badea
- (Spain) Marta López
- (Ukraine) (Russia) Yulia Managarova
- (Serbia) Željka Nikolić
- (Japan) Asuka Fujita
- (Sweden) Nathalie Hagman
- (France) Alicia Toublanc

=== Line players ===
- (Romania) Valentina Cozma
- (Romania) Oana Manea
- (Romania) Ionela Stanca
- (Romania) Victorina Bora
- (Romania) Raluca Agrigoroaie
- (Romania) Nicoleta Balog
- (Russia) Ekaterina Vetkova
- (Russia) Daria Ilina
- (Montenegro) Bobana Klikovac
- (Hungary) Rita Borbás
- (Serbia) Marija Petrović
- (Norway) Maren Nyland Aardahl

=== Left backs ===
- (Romania) Edit Matei
- (Romania) Lidia Drăgănescu
- (Romania) Simona Gogîrlă
- (Romania) Carmen Amariei
- (Romania) Narcisa Lecușanu
- (Romania) Valeria Motogna-Beșe
- (Romania) Cristina Neagu
- (Romania) Adina Laura Meiroșu
- (Romania) Clara Vădineanu
- (Romania) Adriana Țăcălie
- (Spain) Alexandrina Barbosa
- (Russia) Olga Gorshenina
- (Montenegro) Marija Jovanović
- (Norway) Karoline Lund
- (Hungary) (Romania) Gabriella Szűcs
- (Serbia) Jelena Trifunović
- (Brazil) Samara da Silva
- (Tunisia) Ines Khouildi
- (Germany) Ewgenija Minevskaja
- (Ukraine) Anastasia Pidpalova
- (Ukraine) Iryna Glibko

=== Central backs ===
- (Romania) Maria Török-Duca
- (Romania) Mihaela Tivadar
- (Romania) Roxana Cherăscu
- (Romania) Roxana Han
- (Romania) Daniela Todor
- (Romania) Aurelia Brădeanu
- (Romania) Mădălina Zamfirescu
- (Spain) Alicia Fernández
- (Ukraine) (Russia) Regina Shymkute
- (France) Allison Pineau
- (Serbia) Kristina Liščević
- (Turkey) Yeliz Özel
- (Sweden) Daniela de Jong

=== Right backs ===
- (Romania) Sorina Teodorovic
- (Romania) Steluța Luca
- (Romania) Mariana Tîrcă
- (Romania) Gabriela Tănase
- (Romania) Patricia Vizitiu
- (Romania) Oana Țiplea
- (Romania) Melinda Geiger
- (Romania) Janina Luca
- (Romania) Ana Maria Savu
- (Romania) Daria Bucur
- (Spain) Mireya González
- (Montenegro) Katarina Bulatović
- (Montenegro) Tanja Ivanović
- (Ukraine) Olha Vashchuk
- (Belarus) Natalia Vasileuskaya

== Coaching history ==
Period	Main coach	Assistant coach
1982-1983	(Romania) Contsantin Popescu	
1983-1984	(Romania) Constantin Popescu	(Romania) Maria Ciulei
1984-1986	(Romania) Ion Gherhard	(Romania) Maria Ciulei
1986-1987	(Romania) Constantin Muscalu	(Romania) Petre Berbecaru
1987-1988	(Romania) Ion Gherhard	(Romania) Maria Ciulei
1988-1989	(Romania) Ion Gherhard	(Romania) Gheorghe Ionescu
1989-1991	(Romania) Gheorghe Ionescu	(Romania) Petre Berbecaru
1991-1992	(Romania) Constantin Cojocaru	(Romania) Petre Berbecaru
1992-1993	(Romania) Lucian Râșniță	(Romania) Constantin Cojocaru
1993-1994	(Romania) Lucian Râșniță	(Romania) Gheorghe Ionescu
1994-1995	(Romania) Constantin Cojocaru	(Romania) Petre Berbecaru
1995-1996	(Romania) Constantin Cojocaru	(Romania) Gheorghe Ionescu, (Romania) Alexandru Mengoni
1996-1997	(Romania) Alexandru Mengoni, (Romania) Lucian Râșniță	(Romania) Petre Berbecaru
1997-1998	(Romania) Lucian Râșniță	(Romania) Petre Berbecaru
1998-2000	(Romania) Bogdan Macovei	(Romania) Petre Berbecaru
2000-2002	(Romania) Mariana Tîrcă	(Romania) Ion Gherhard
2002-2003	(Romania) Mariana Tîrcă	(Romania) Petre Berbecaru
2003-2004	(Romania) Mariana Tîrcă	(Romania) Petre Berbecaru, (Romania) Maria Török-Duca
2004-2005	(Romania) Liviu Paraschiv, (Romania) Maria Török-Duca, (Romania) Gheorghe Ionescu	(Romania) Petre Berbecaru
2005-2006	(Serbia) Đorđe Rašić, (Romania) Cornel Bădulescu	(Romania) Petre Berbecaru
2006-2008	(Romania) Gheorghe Tadici	(Romania) Popa Seviștean
2008-2009	(Croatia) Ivica Rimanić, (Romania) Radu Voina	(Romania) Aurelian Roșca
2009-2010	(Romania) Radu Voina	(Romania) Aurelian Roșca
2010-2011	(Hungary) Péter Kovács, (Denmark) Anja Andersen, (Romania) Radu Voina	(Romania) Aurelian Roșca, (Romania) Maria Török-Duca
2011-2012	(Romania) Radu Voina	(Romania) Aurelian Roșca, (Romania) Steluța Luca
2012-2013	(Denmark) Jakob Vestergaard	(Denmark) Mette Klit, (Romania) Steluța Luca
2013	(Romania) Steluța Luca	(Romania) Aurelian Roșca
2013-2014	(Romania) Maria Török-Duca, (Romania) Simona Gogîrlă	(Romania) Maria Rădoi
2014-2015	(Romania) Dumitru Muși	(Romania) Maria Török-Duca
2015-2016	(Romania) Constantin Ștefan	(Romania) Maria Török-Duca, (Romania) Nicoleta Lazăr
2017	(Romania) Ghoerghe Sbora	(Romania) Luminiţa Dinu-Huţupan
2017-2018	(Romania) Aurelian Roșca, (Romania) Ghoerghe Sbora	(Romania) Luminiţa Dinu-Huţupan
2018-2021	(Romania) Florentin Pera	(Romania) Maria Rădoi, (Romania) Ildiko Barbu, (Serbia) Goran Kurteš
2021	(Serbia) Goran Kurteš	(Romania) Daniela Joița
2021-2024	(Norway) Bent Dahl	(Romania) Daniela Joița, (Denmark) Rasmus Rygaard Poulsen, (Romania) Luminița Dinu
2024-2025	(Denmark) Rasmus Rygaard Poulsen	(Romania) Luminița Dinu
2025-2027	(Romania) Florentin Pera	(Romania) Mihai Rohozneanu

== See also ==
- Oltchim
