= Corina Lupei =

Romanian handball player (born 2002)

Personal information
- Born: 12 July 2002 (age 24) Târgu Mureș, Romania
- Height: 1.75 m (5 ft 9 in)

Sport
- Sport: Handball
- Position: Left wing
- Current club: HC Dunărea Brăila
- Number: 89

Youth career
- Years: Team
- –: CS Arena Târgu Mureș

Senior clubs
- Years: Team
- 2020–2023: SCM Râmnicu Vâlcea
- 2023-: HC Dunărea Brăila
National team
- Years: Team
- 2022–: Romania
- Updated on 7 November 2022

Corina Elena Romina Lupei (born 12 July 2002) is a Romanian handball player who plays as a left wing for HC Dunărea Brăila and the Romania national team.

She represented Romania at the 2022 European Championship.

== Professional career ==
Lupei debuted together with Andreea Țîrle as a senior for SCM Râmnicu Vâlcea in October 2020 when they both were only 18 years old. At that moment the handball team had a series of 10 handball players unavailable for championship matches due to COVID-19 infections. The Romanian left wing stood out with her good performances since the first matches in the Vâlcea’s jersey, becoming an important player for her team. After the national league’s matches she debuted in the same season (2020/21) in EHF Champions League with her first (2) goals in competition against the Montenegrin team, Budućnost Podgorica.

Later, in April 2022, she also made her debut with the senior national team of Romania, in the preliminaries of the 2022 European Women's Handball Championship. Eventually she was selected in the group of 18 players, present at the final tournament in November same year.

In February 2023 she became free of contract after filing a request to the Romanian Handball Federation (FRH), citing the fact that she is not developing as much as she would like because of the few minutes spent on the playing field.

After leaving Vâlcea, Lupei signed a 2 years and a half contract with the Romanian club, HC Dunărea Brăila.
