= Elena Florica =

Romanian handball player (born 1992)

Cristina Florica
Personal information
- Full name: Elena Cristina Florica
- Nationality: Romanian
- Born: 11 May 1992 (age 34) Crețeni, Vâlcea, Romania
- Height: 1.70 m (5 ft 7 in)

Sport
- Sport: Handball
- Position: Left wing
- Current club: SCM Râmnicu Vâlcea (handball)
- Number: 22

Youth career
- Years: Team
- –: Centrul Național de Excelență

Senior clubs
- Years: Team
- 2012–2016: SCM Craiova
- 2016–: SCM Râmnicu Vâlcea (handball)
National team
Years	Team	Apps	(Gls)
2016–	Romania	45	(31)
Medal record
World University Championship
Silver medal – second place	2016 Spain

Elena Cristina Florica (born 11 May 1992) is a Romanian handballer for Râmnicu Vâlcea and the Romanian national team.

== Achievements ==
- World University Championship:
  - Silver Medalist: 2016
