= 1989–90 Women's European Cup (handball) =

The 1989–90 Women's European Champions Cup was the 29th edition of the Europe's competition for national champions women's handball clubs, running between October 1989 and 27 May 1990. Defending champion Hypo Niederösterreich defeated Kuban Krasnodar in the final to win its second title.

== Qualifying round ==
| Team #1 | Agg. | Team #2 | 1st | 2nd |
|---|---|---|---|---|
| GE Verias (Greece) | 82–37 | Cyprus College | 41–18 | 41–19 |
| Vesta (Norway) | 49–35 | (Iceland) Fram Reykjavik | 24–17 | 25–18 |
| Íber Valencia (Spain) | 44–36 | (Portugal) Benfica | 20–18 | 24–18 |
| Westfriesland (Netherlands) | 48–16 | (United Kingdom) Manchester United Salford | 25–11 | 23–5 |
| Brühl (Switzerland) | 51–42 | (Austria) Union Hollabrunn | 30–19 | 21–23 |
| Cassano Magnago (Italy) | 57–29 | (Israel) Harasim Ramat Gan | 32–11 | 25–18 |
| Turku (Finland) | 29–40 | (Sweden) Tyresö HF | 15–19 | 14–21 |
| ZVL Presov (Czechoslovakia) | 36–48 | (Hungary) Építők SC | 20–26 | 16–22 |
| CSKA Sofia (Bulgaria) | 39–39 | (Poland) Wroclaw | 26–20 | 13–19 |
| Empor Rostock (East Germany) | 55–39 | (Denmark) Frederiksberg IF | 28–16 | 27–23 |
| Arçelik İstanbul (Turkey) | 34–61 | (Socialist Federal Republic of Yugoslavia) Budućnost Titograd | 15–30 | 19–31 |
| ASPTT Metz (France) | 33–29 | (Belgium) Initia Hasselt | 20–15 | 13–14 |
| Dudelange (Luxembourg) | 8–84 | (West Germany) TV Lützellinden | 2–37 | 6–47 |

== Round of 16 ==
| Team #1 | Agg. | Team #2 | 1st | 2nd |
|---|---|---|---|---|
| Niederösterreich (Austria) | 69–17 | (Greece) GE Verias | 38–9 | 31–8 |
| Vestar (Norway) | 51–37 | (Spain) Íber Valencia | 29–17 | 22–20 |
| Westfriesland (Netherlands) | 39–40 | (Switzerland) Brühl | 20–18 | 19–22 |
| Tyresö HF (Sweden) | 35–40 | (Italy) Cassano Magnago | 18–19 | 17–21 |
| Építők SC (Hungary) | 36–37 | (Poland) Wroclaw | 17–17 | 19–20 |
| Chim. Râmnicu Vâlcea (Romania) | 58–46 | (East Germany) Empor Rostock | 31–27 | 27–19 |
| Budućnost Titograd (Socialist Federal Republic of Yugoslavia) | 50–38 | (France) ASPTT Metz | 27–16 | 23–22 |
| Kuban Krasnodar (Soviet Union) | 56–39 | (West Germany) TV Lützellinden | 25–19 | 31–20 |

== Quarter-finals ==
| Team #1 | Agg. | Team #2 | 1st | 2nd |
|---|---|---|---|---|
| Vestar (Norway) | 35–45 | (Austria) Niederösterreich | 22–17 | 13–28 |
| Brühl (Switzerland) | 45–42 | (Italy) Cassano Magnago | 27–19 | 18–23 |
| Chim. Râmnicu Vâlcea (Romania) | 59–53 | (Poland) Wroclaw | 34–24 | 25–29 |
| Kuban Krasnodar (Soviet Union) | 61–55 | (Socialist Federal Republic of Yugoslavia) Budućnost Titograd | 31–22 | 30–33 |

== Semifinals ==
| Team #1 | Agg. | Team #2 | 1st | 2nd |
|---|---|---|---|---|
| Niederösterreich (Austria) | 69–31 | (Switzerland) Brühl | 37–14 | 32–17 |
| Chim. Râmnicu Vâlcea (Romania) | 50–51 | (Soviet Union) Kuban Krasnodar | 28–22 | 22–29 |

== Final ==
| Date | Team #1 | Agg. | Team #2 | 1st | 2nd |
|---|---|---|---|---|---|
| 20.05.1990 27.05.1990 | Niederösterreich (Austria) | 59–50 | (Soviet Union) Kuban Krasnodar | 29–24 | 30–26 |
