= Mihaela Băbeanu =

Romanian handball player (born 1986)

Personal information
- Full name: Mihaela Andreea Băbeanu
- Nationality: Romanian
- Born: 1 March 1986 (age 40) Slatina, Romania
- Height: 1.78 m (5 ft 10 in)

Sport
- Sport: Handball
- Position: Goalkeeper
- Current club: HCM Râmnicu Vâlcea

Senior clubs
- Years: Team
- 2004-2005: Universitatea Remin Deva
- 2005–2013: Oltchim Râmnicu Vâlcea
- 2010–2011: → Tomis Constanţa (loan)
- 2012–2013: → HCM Baia Mare (loan)
- 2013–2014: HCM Baia Mare
- 2014-: HCM Râmnicu Vâlcea
National team
Years	Team	Apps	(Gls)
–	Romania	26	(0)
Medal record
European Championship
Bronze medal – third place	2010 Denmark & Norway	Team
- Updated on 16 December 2012

Mihaela Băbeanu (née Smedescu; born 1 March 1986 in Slatina, Romania) is a Romanian handballer who plays for the club HCM Râmnicu Vâlcea.

== Achievements ==
- Romanian Championship:
  - Silver Medalist: 2013
- Romanian Cup:
  - Winner: 2013
- EHF Champions League:
  - Finalist: 2010
  - Semifinalist: 2009, 2012
- EHF Cup Winners' Cup:
  - Winner: 2007
- European Championship:
  - Bronze Medalist: 2010
  - Fifth Place: 2008
