= Grit Jurack =

German handball player (born 1977)

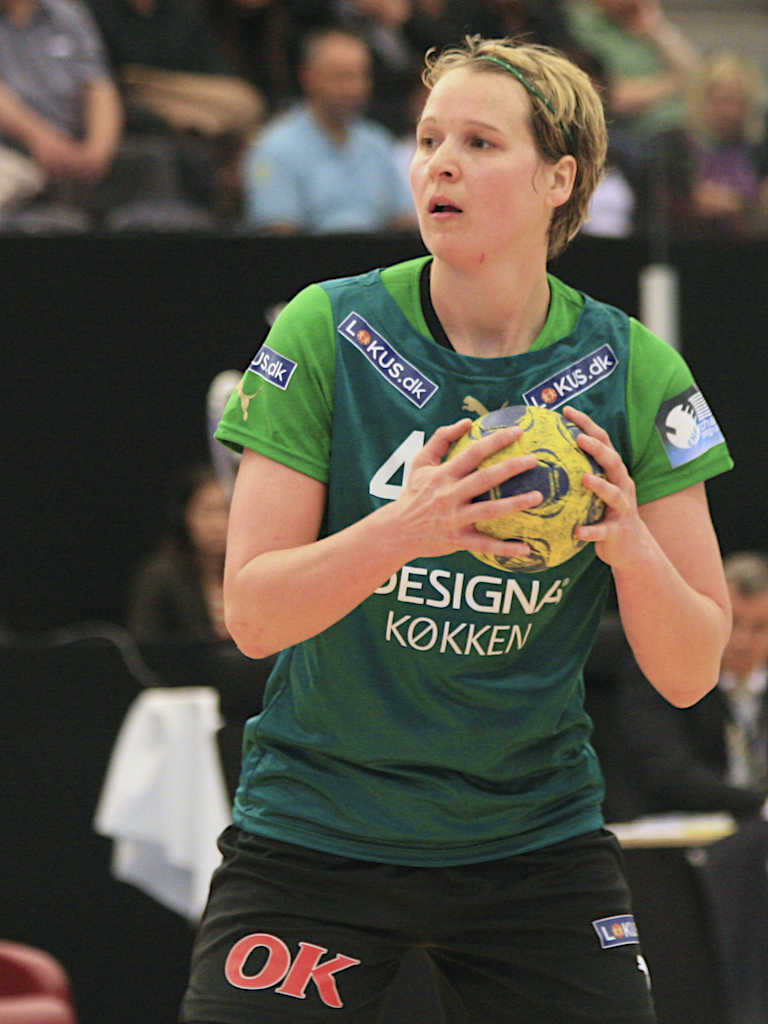

Personal information
- Nationality: German
- Born: 22 October 1977 (age 48) Leipzig, East Germany
- Height: 1.86 m (6 ft 1 in)

Sport
- Sport: Handball
- Position: Right back
- Current club: Retired

Senior clubs
- Years: Team
- 1989–1993: BSV Schönau Leipzig
- 1993–2004: HC Leipzig
- 2001–2003: → Ikast-Bording Elite Håndbold (loan)
- 2004–2012: Viborg HK
National team
| Years | Team | Apps | (Gls) |
| 2000–2012 | Germany | 306 | (1581) |

Teams managed
- 2015–2016: Germany women (assistant)
- 2016–: TSV Glücksburg
Medal record
World Championship
| Bronze medal – third place | 2007 France | Team |
| Bronze medal – third place | 1997 Germany | Team |

Grit Jurack (born 22 October 1977) is a German former handball player, who played on the German women's national team. She is considered one of the best German players ever, and she holds both the record for most matches and most goals for the German National Team, as well as the second most international goals overall. She was included in the European Handball Federation Hall of Fame in 2023.

== Career ==
Jurack started her career at BSV Schönau Leipzig, where she played from 1989 to 1993. She then joined HC Leipzig, where she won the 1998 and 1999 German Championship. From 2001 to 2003 she played for Danish side Ikast-Bording Elite Håndbold, where she won the 2002 EHF Cup and Danish Cup. She then returned to Leipzig for a single season.

In 2004 she joined Danish team Viborg HK. Here she won the Danish Championship as the first German ever. She won the Champions League with Viborg HK in 2009 and was the top scorer of the tournament with 113 goals. In the same season she was the topscorer in the Danish league with 125 goals. She also won the Champions League two additional times on 04-05 and in 2009-10. She ended her handball career on 7 October 2012 due to a shoulder injury.

== National team ==
She made her debut for the Germany women's national handball team on 23 January 1996 against USA.

She was Top Scorer in the 2007 World Women's Handball Championship and included on the All-Star Team. and also obtained bronze medal in the championship.

=== European championships ===
At the 2004 European Women's Handball Championship Jurack was included in the All-star team, as best right back, when Germany finished 5th at the tournament. She represented Germany at the 2006 European Women's Handball Championship, where they finished 4th. She was also selected into the all-star-team at the 2008 European Women's Handball Championship, as best right back, where Germany finished 4th.

== Coaching career ==
Between March 2015 and January 2016 she was the Team Manager and assistant coach at the German women's national team.

In 2016 she became a youth coach at TSV Glücksburg.

== National team Results ==
=== Performance in Olympic Games ===
- 1996 : 6th place
- 2008 : 11th place

=== Performance in World Championship ===
- 1997 : Third place (Bronze medal)
- 1999 : 7th place
- 2003 : 12th place
- 2005 : 6th place
- 2007 : Third place (Bronze medal)

=== Performance in European Championship ===
- 1996 : 4th place
- 1998 : 6th place
- 2000 : 9th place
- 2004 : 5th place
- 2006 : 4th place
- 2008 : 4th place

== See also ==
- List of women's handballers with 1000 or more international goals

Awards
| Preceded by (Hungary) Tímea Tóth | EHF Champions League top scorer 2008–09 | Succeeded by (Romania) Cristina Vărzaru |
