= 1983–84 Women's IHF Cup =

European handball tournament

The 1983–84 Women's EHF Cup|Women's IHF Cup was the third edition of the competition, taking place from 1983 to 1 April 1984. 12 teams took part in it, with the absence of six countries that contested the previous edition including finalists Soviet Union and East Germany, so the Round of 16 was suppressed. On the other hand, Luxembourg made its debut. Chimistul Ramnicu Vâlcea became the first Romanian club to win the trophy by beating VfL Oldenburg, which was the first team from Western Europe to reach the final.

== Qualifying round ==
Team #1	Agg.	Team #2	1st match	2nd match
Torres Novas (Portugal)	walkover	(Romania) Chimistul Rm. Vâlcea		
Holstebro (Denmark)	29–31	(Netherlands) Swift Roermond	14–15	15–16
Zaragoza (Spain)	27–49	(France) Universitaire Lyon	18–23	9–26
Oldenburg (Germany)	96–8	(Luxembourg) La Fraternelle Esch	53–4	43–4
Sporting Neerpelt (Belgium)	20–65	(Norway) Baekkelagets	8–32	12–33

== Quarter-finals ==
Team #1	Agg.	Team #2	1st match	2nd match
Chimistul Rm. Vâlcea (Romania)	56–37	(Netherlands) Swift Roermond	32–16	24–21
Universitaire Lyon (France)	37–55	(Hungary) Budapesti Spartacus	17–29	20–26
Lokomotiva Mostar (Socialist Federal Republic of Yugoslavia)	47–52	(Czech Republic) Iskra Partizanske	27–21	20–31
Oldenburg (Germany)	35–33	(Norway) Baekkelagets	18–17	17–16

== Semifinals ==
Team #1	Agg.	Team #2	1st match	2nd match
Chimistul Rm. Vâlcea (Romania)	51–42	(Hungary) Budapesti Spartacus	28–21	23–21
Iskra Partizanske (Czech Republic)	34–34	(Germany) Oldenburg	21–16	13–18

== Final ==
Team #1	Agg.	Team #2	1st match	2nd match
Chimistul Rm. Vâlcea (Romania)	51–39	(Germany) Oldenburg	22–18	29–21
