= Maria Török-Duca =

Romanian handball player (born 1959)

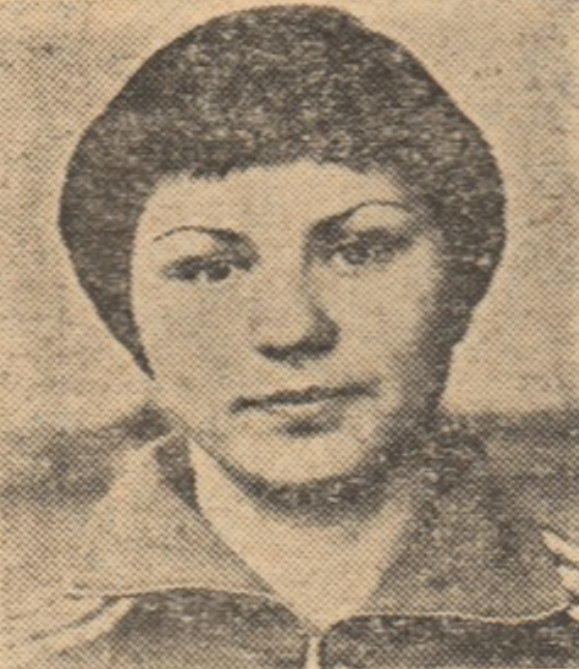

Personal information
- Nationality: Romanian
- Born: 25 January 1959 (age 67) Sfântu Gheorghe, Romania

Sport
- Sport: Handball
- Position: Playmaker
- Current club: Retired

Youth career
- Years: Team
- 1974–1979: CSȘ Oltul Sfântu Gheorghe

Senior clubs
- Years: Team
- 1979–1982: Știința Bacău
- 1982–1990: Chimistul Râmnicu Vâlcea
- 1990–1992: Íber Valencia
- 1992–1993: Mar Alicante
- 1993–1994: Oltchim Râmnicu Vâlcea
National team
Years	Team	Apps	(Gls)
1977–1987	Romania	226	(626)

Teams managed
- 2004–2005: Oltchim Râmnicu Vâlcea
- 2007–2011: CNOE Râmnicu Vâlcea
- 2011–2013: HCM Török
- 2013: HCM Râmnicu Vâlcea

Maria Török-Duca (née Török; born 25 January 1959), formerly known as Maria Verigeanu, is a Romanian professional handball manager and former player. She is regarded by some as the greatest Romanian playmaker of all time.

In 2010, she was given the award of Cetățean de onoare ("Honorary Citizen") of the city of Râmnicu Vâlcea (where she resides).

== Trophies ==
- Liga Națională:
  - Winner: 1979, 1980, 1982, 1989, 1990, 1994
- Cupa României:
  - Winner: 1980, 1982, 1984, 1990, 1994
- División de Honor:
  - Winner: 1990, 1991
- Copa de la Reina:
  - Winner: 1990, 1991
- IHF Cup:
  - Winner: 1984, 1989
- IHF Super Cup:
  - Winner: 1984
