= Adina Laura Meiroșu =

Romanian handball player (born 1985)

Adina Meiroșu
Personal information
- Full name: Adina Laura Meiroșu
- Nationality: Romanian
- Born: 11 August 1985 (age 41) Galaţi, Romania
- Height: 1.80 m (5 ft 11 in)

Sport
- Sport: Handball
- Position: Left Back
- Current club: Retired

Senior clubs
- Years: Team
- ––2013: Oltchim Râmnicu Vâlcea
National team
Years	Team	Apps	(Gls)
–	Romania	176	(418)
Medal record
European Championship
Bronze medal – third place	2010 Denmark & Norway	Team
- Updated on 16 December 2012

Adina Laura Meiroșu (former Fiera; born 11 August 1985, in Galaţi) is a retired Romanian handballer.

She retired at the end of the 2012-13 season because of recurring knees injuries.

== International honours ==
- EHF Champions League:
  - Finalist: 2010
  - Semifinalist: 2009, 2012, 2013
- EHF Champions Trophy:
  - Winner: 2007
- EHF Cup Winners' Cup:
  - Winner: 2007
- Youth European Championship:
  - Silver Medalist: 2003
- European Championship:
  - Bronze Medalist: 2010
  - Fifth Place: 2008
- World Championship:
  - Fourth Place: 2007
