= Patricia Vizitiu =

Romanian handball player (born 1988)

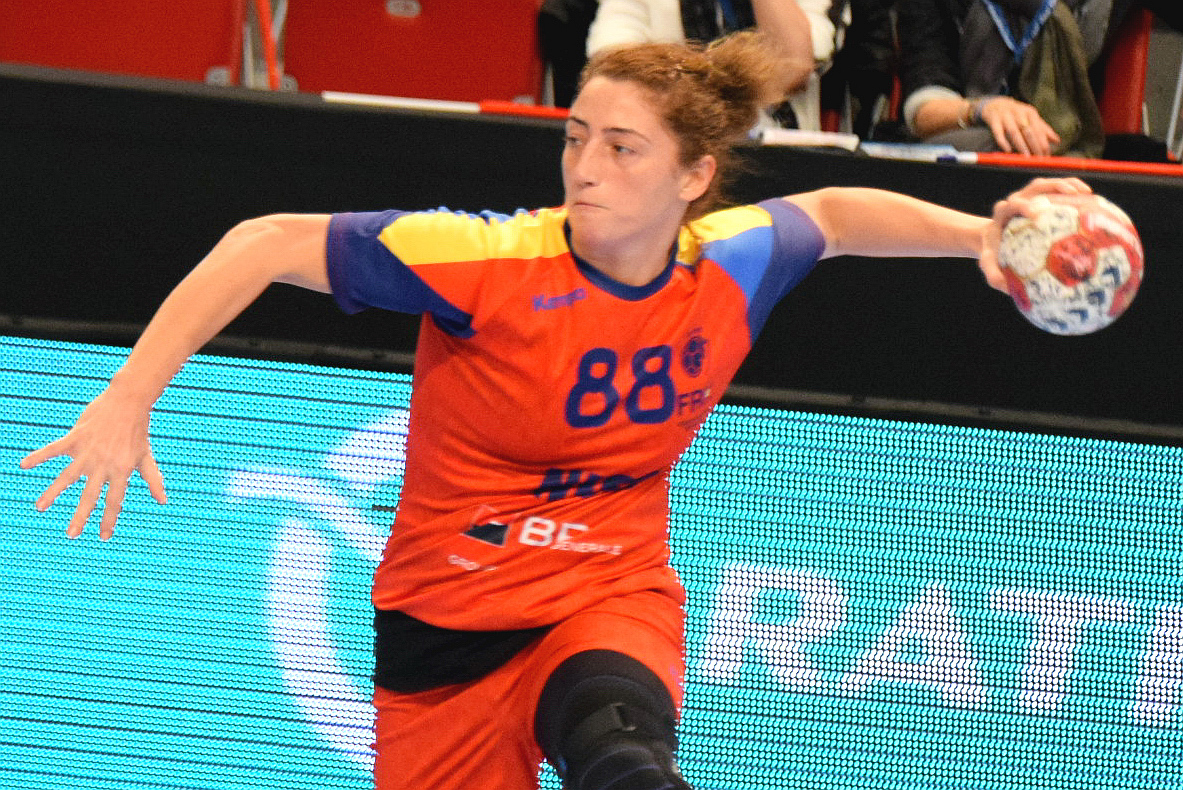
- Vizitiu in 2015

Personal information
- Full name: Patricia Maria Vizitiu
- Nationality: Romanian
- Born: 15 October 1988 (age 38) Petroşani, Romania
- Height: 1.75 m (5 ft 9 in)

Sport
- Sport: Handball
- Position: Right back
- Current club: ASC Corona 2010 Brașov
- Number: 88

Senior clubs
- Years: Team
- 2006–2009: CS Rulmentul Braşov
- 2009–2012: CS Oltchim Râmnicu Vâlcea
- 2012–2013: Üsküdar Bld. SK
- 2013–2014: RK Krim
- 2014–2015: CSM București
- 2015–2016: HCM Baia Mare
- 2016–2017: HCM Râmnicu Vâlcea
- 2017–2020: SCM Craiova
- 2020-2021: CSU Danubius Galați
- 2021: CS Dacia Mioveni
- 2022-: ASC Corona 2010 Brașov
- 2022: CS Activ Prahova-Ploiesti
National team
Years	Team	Apps	(Gls)
2008-2020	Romania	46	(61)
Medal record
World Championship
Bronze medal – third place	2015 Denmark
World Youth Championship
Bronze medal – third place	2006 Canada
European Junior Championship
Bronze medal – third place	2007 Turkey
European Youth Championship
Silver medal – second place	2005 Austria
World University Championship
Silver medal – second place	2016 Spain

Patricia Maria Vizitiu (born 15 October 1988) is a Romanian female handballer for ASC Corona 2010 Brașov (women's handball) and the Romanian national team.

Her father Dumitru Vizitiu was a footballer in the 1980s. Her older brother Dacian is also a footballer.

== International honours ==
- EHF Champions League:
  - Silver Medalist: 2010
  - Bronze Medalist: 2009, 2012
- EHF Cup:
  - Gold Medalist: 2018
- EHF Challenge Cup:
  - Gold Medalist: 2007
- EHF Cup Winners' Cup:
  - Silver Medalist: 2008
