= Cristina Vărzaru =

Romanian handball player (born 1979)

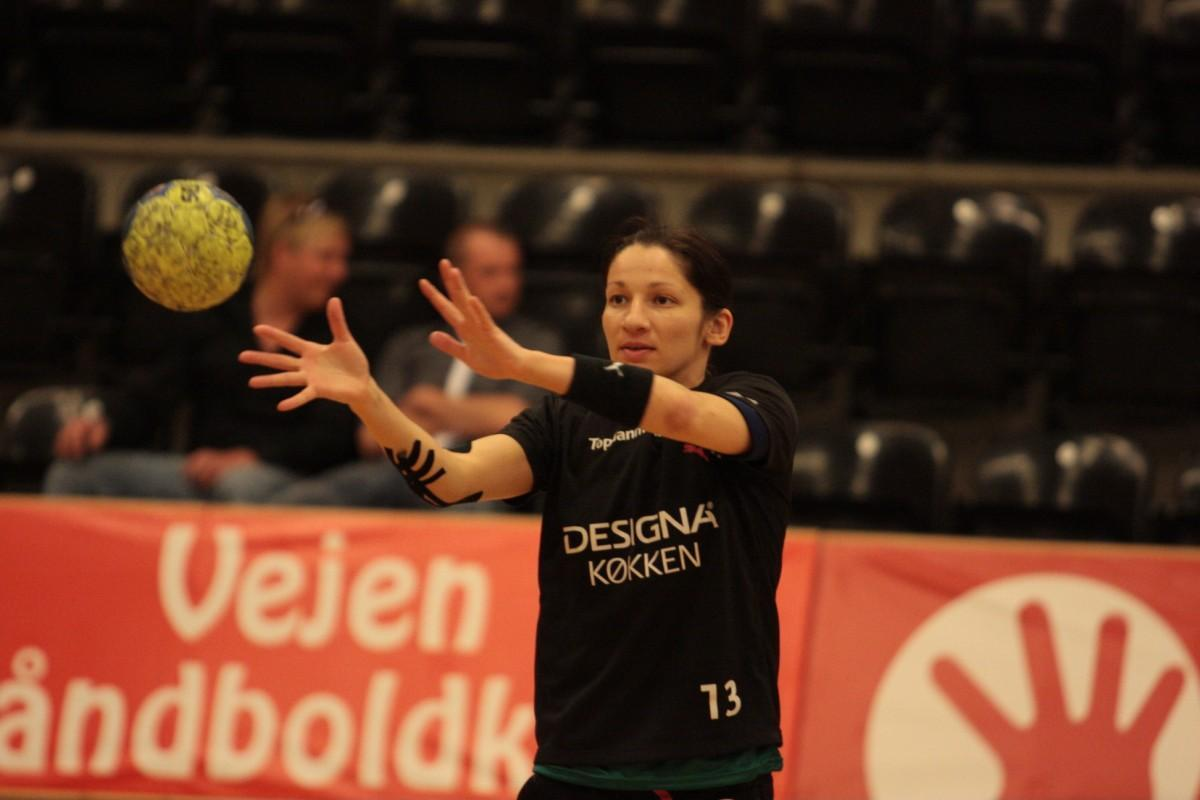
- Vărzaru in 2009

Personal information
- Full name: Cristina Georgiana Vărzaru
- Born: 5 December 1979 (age 46) Corabia, Romania
- Height: 1.67 m (5 ft 6 in)

Sport
- Sport: Handball
- Position: Right wing
- Current club: Retired

Senior clubs
- Years: Team
- 1998–2002: CS Oltchim Râmnicu Vâlcea
- 2002–2005: CS Rapid București
- 2005–2012: Viborg HK
- 2012–2017: CSM București
National team
Years	Team	Apps	(Gls)
1997–2017	Romania	179	(493)
Medal record
Youth World Championship
Gold medal – first place	1999 China	Team
Youth European Championship
Gold medal – first place	1998 Slovakia	Team
World Championship
Silver medal – second place	2005 Russia	Team
European Championship
Bronze medal – third place	2010 Denmark & Norway	Team
- Updated on 2 December 2011

Cristina Georgiana Vărzaru (born 5 December 1979) is a Romanian retired professional handball player who last played for CSM București. She was a member of the Romanian national team.

She was included in the European Handball Federation Hall of Fame in 2023.

== Biography ==
Vărzaru participated at the 2000 Summer Olympics where Romania finished seventh. She received a silver medal at the 2005 World Championship and a bronze one at the 2010 European World Championship.

She won the Champions League in 2006, 2009, 2010 and 2016, first three with Viborg HK and the last with CSM București.

She was top goalscorer of the 2009–10 EHF Women's Champions League edition, with a total of 101 goals .

She was given the award of Cetățean de onoare ("Honorary Citizen") of the city of Bucharest in 2016.

== Honours ==
=== Domestic ===
- Romanian Championship:
  - Champion: 1999, 2000, 2002, 2003, 2015, 2016, 2017
- Romanian Cup:
  - Winner: 1999, 2002, 2004, 2016, 2017
- Danish Championship:
  - Champion: 2006, 2008, 2009, 2010
- Danish Cup:
  - Winner: 2007, 2008, 2009, 2010, 2011

=== European ===
- EHF Champions League:
  - Winner: 2006, 2009, 2010, 2016
  - Bronze Medalist: 2017
- EHF Champions Trophy:
  - Winner: 2006
- EHF Cup Winners' Cup:
  - Finalist: 2002, 2012

=== National team ===
- World Championship:
  - Silver Medalist: 2005
- European Championship:
  - Bronze Medalist: 2010

== Personal life ==
Both parents are teachers. She has a twin sister, Anca, who graduated the Bucharest Academy of Economic Studies and who used to work for Big 4 companies. The other sister, Gabriela, is a Mathematics teacher in Râmnicu Vâlcea same as the father of the girls. Her mother is teacher of French.

Awards
Preceded by (Germany) Grit Jurack	EHF Champions League top scorer 2009–10	Succeeded by (Norway) Heidi Løke
