= Adriana Nechita =

Romanian handball player (born 1983)

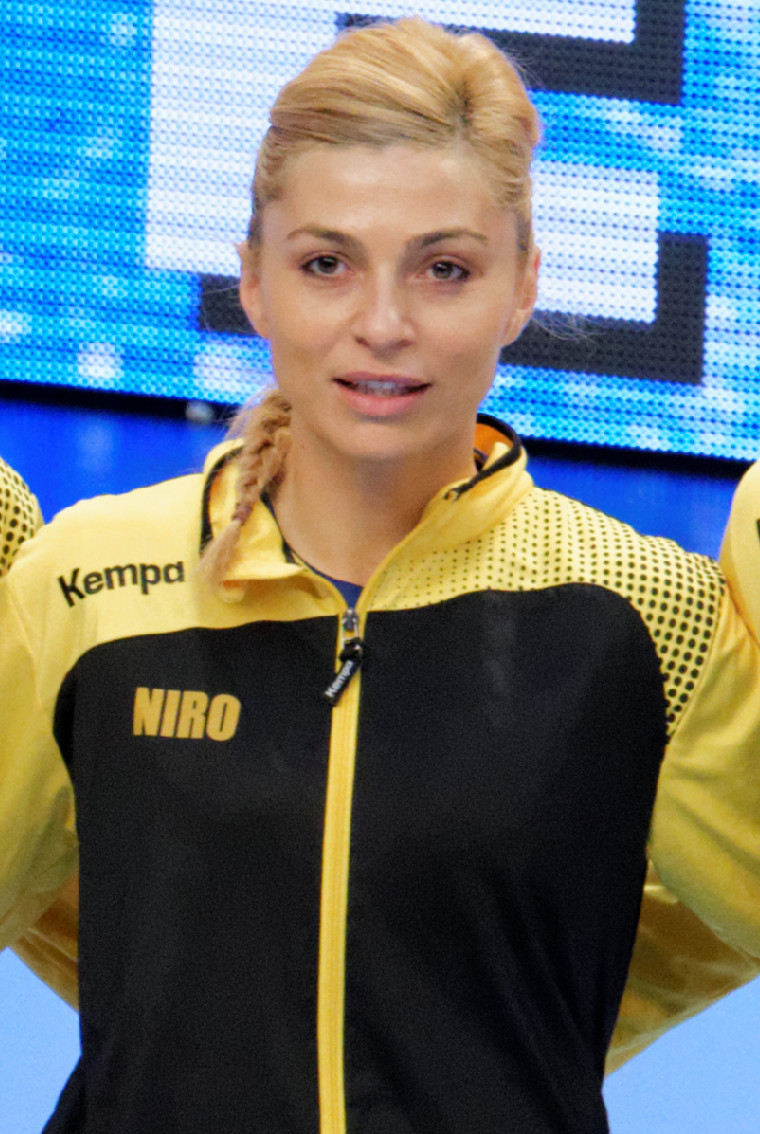
- November 29, 2015.

Personal information
- Full name: Adriana-Nicoleta Nechita
- Nationality: Romanian
- Born: 14 November 1983 (age 42) Băilești, Romania
- Height: 1.72 m (5 ft 8 in)

Sport
- Sport: Handball
- Position: Right wing
- Current club: Retired

Senior clubs
- Years: Team
- 2000–2013: Oltchim Rm. Valcea
- 2013–2016: HCM Baia Mare
National team
Years	Team	Apps	(Gls)
–	Romania	130	(318)
Medal record
World Championship
Bronze medal – third place	2015 Denmark
European Championship
Bronze medal – third place	2010 Denmark/Norway

Adriana-Nicoleta Nechita (former Olteanu; born 14 November 1983) is a Romanian handballer who plays for HCM Baia Mare and the Romanian national team.

== International honours ==
- EHF Champions League:
  - Finalist: 2010
  - Semifinalist: 2009, 2012, 2013
- EHF Champions Trophy:
  - Winner: 2007
- EHF Cup Winners' Cup:
  - Winner: 2007
  - Semifinalist: 2002

== Gallery ==
Adriana Nechita with her national team in 2015

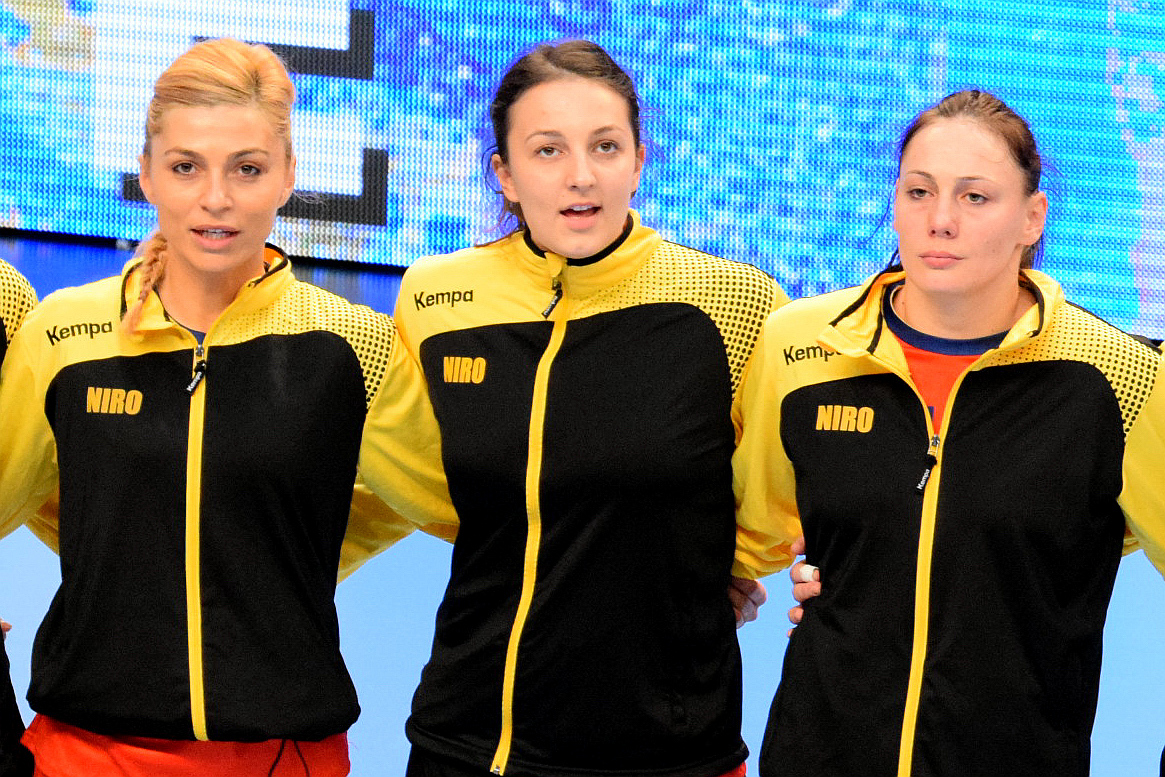

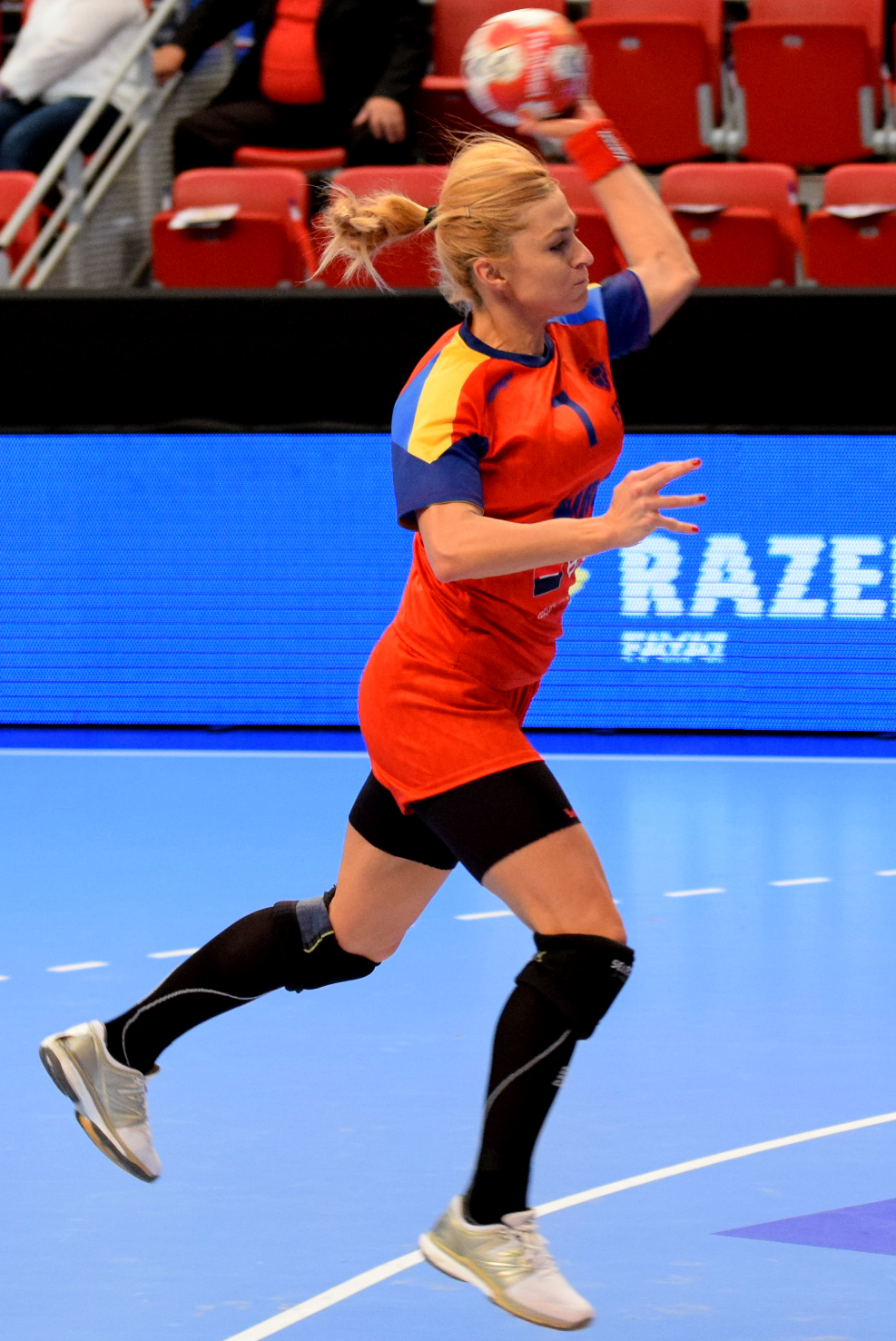
