= 2002 EHF Women's Cup Winners' Cup =

The 2002 EHF Women's Cup Winners' Cup was the 26th edition of EHF's competition for women's handball national cup champions. It ran from January 11 to May 18, 2002.

Like the previous edition, the trophy was won by a team from the former Soviet Union. Lada Togliatti, founded four years earlier, defeated 1984 and 1989 EHF Cup champion Oltchim Râmnicu Vâlcea in the final, becoming the competition's fourth champion from Russia. Lada also won its first Russian Superleague in this season.

== Results ==
Preliminary round January 11–20, 2002
(Hungary) Debreceni VSC	45	36	81
(Azerbaijan) Qaradağ Baku	20	32	52
(Bosnia and Herzegovina) Jedinsto Tuzla	24	18	42
(Germany) Bayer Leverkusen	35	38	73
(Faroe Islands) Vestmanna ÍF	14	20	34
(Netherlands) Hellas Den Haag	30	25	55
(Turkey) TMO Istanbul	42	28	70
(North Macedonia) Tutunski K. Prilep	18	21	39
(Switzerland) TSV Saint Othmar	13	23	36
(Croatia) Koka Varazdin	28	29	57
(Lithuania) Eglė Vilnius	20	12	32
(Ukraine) Spartak Kyiv	18	24	42
(Czech Republic) Novesta Zlín	25	20	45
(Romania) Oltchim Rm. Vâlcea	25	27	52
(Italy) HC Messana	41	26	67
(Slovenia) Olimpija Ljubljana	24	26	50
(Poland) Zagłębie Lubin	32	28	60
(Portugal) Colégio de Gaia	12	20	32
(Israel) Maccabi-K.S. Holon	19	20	39
(Austria) Flaga Korneuburg	26	25	51
(Cyprus) EN Athienou	14	10	24
(France) ASPTT Metz	46	58	104
(Belarus) Arkatron Minsk	14	18	32
(Russia) Lada Togliatti	42	36	78
(Greece) Ormi Patras	28	20	48
(Serbia and Montenegro) K. Miloš Aranđelovac	26	26	52

Round of 16; February 15–24, 2002
(Hungary) Debreceni VSC	25	25	50
(Germany) Bayer Leverkusen	23	32	55
(Spain) Elda Prestigio	26	26	52
(Netherlands) Hellas Den Haag	15	25	40
(Turkey) TMO Istanbul	22	23	45
(Croatia) Koka Varazdin (a)	21	24	45
(Ukraine) Spartak Kyiv	23	24	47
(Romania) Oltchim Rm. Vâlcea	34	35	69
(Italy) HC Messana	22	25	47
(Norway) Nordstrand IF	43	39	82
(Poland) Zagłębie Lubin	40	28	68
(Austria) Flaga Korneuburg	15	18	33
(France) ASPTT Metz	24	21	45
(Denmark) Horsens HK	17	24	41
(Russia) Lada Togliatti	27	26	53
(Serbia and Montenegro) K. Miloš Aranđelovac	20	12	32

Quarterfinals; March 16–23, 2002
(Germany) Bayer Leverkusen	29	22	51
(Spain) Elda Prestigio	28	25	53
(Croatia) Koka Varazdin	19	25	44
(Romania) Oltchim Rm. Vâlcea	31	31	62
(Norway) Nordstrand IF	23	20	43
(Poland) Zagłębie Lubin	18	27	45
(France) ASPTT Metz	32	26	58
(Russia) Lada Togliatti	28	32	60

Semifinals; April 14–21, 2002
(Spain) Elda Prestigio	26	23	49
(Romania) Oltchim Rm. Vâlcea	23	30	53
(Poland) Zagłębie Lubin	20	17	37
(Russia) Lada Togliatti	34	32	66

Final; May 12–18, 2002
(Romania) Oltchim Rm. Vâlcea	32	20	52
(Russia) Lada Togliatti	27	28	55
