= Crețeni =

- Commune
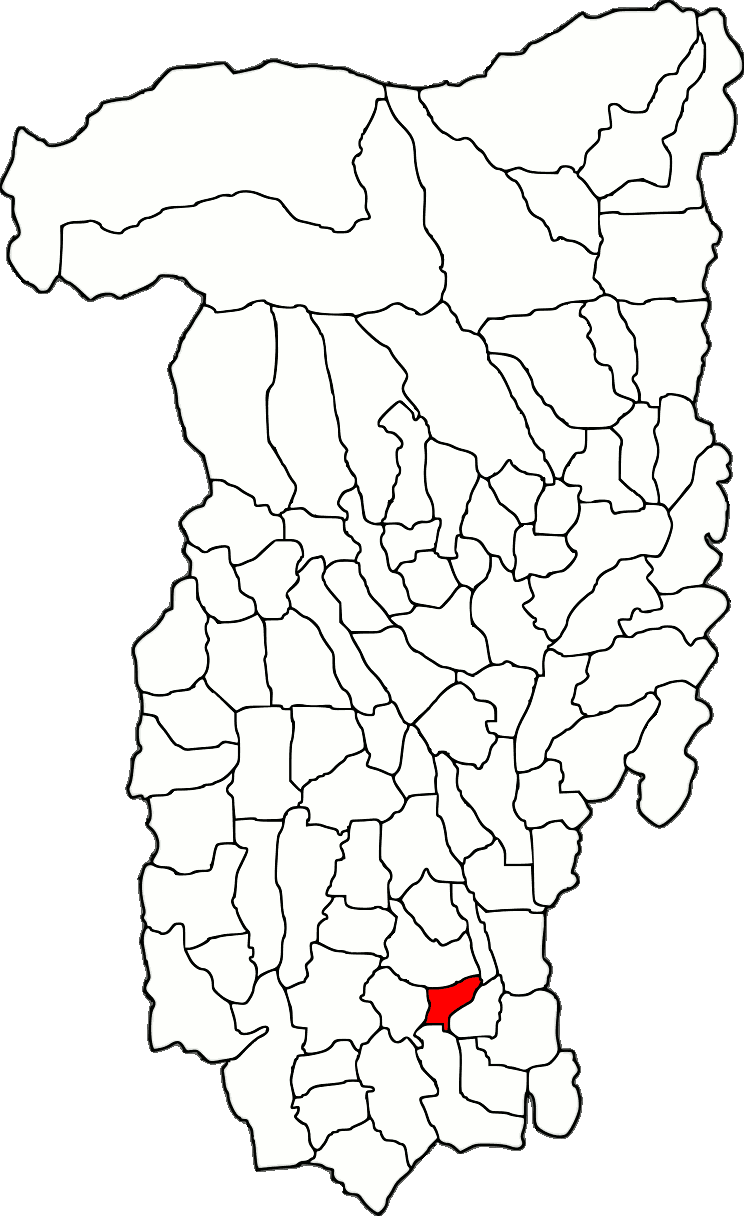
- Location in Vâlcea County

- Location in Romania
- Coordinates: 44°41′N 24°11′E
- Country: Romania
- County: Vâlcea

Government
  - Mayor (2024–2028): Constantin Catrina (PSD)
- Area: 29.86 km^{2} (11.53 sq mi)
- Elevation: 184 m (604 ft)
- Population (2021-12-01): 1,934
  - Density: 64.77/km^{2} (167.8/sq mi)
- Time zone: UTC+02:00 (EET)
  - Summer (DST): UTC+03:00 (EEST)
- Postal code: 247120
- Area code: +(40) 250
- Vehicle reg.: VL
- Website: primaria-creteni.ro

Crețeni is a commune located in Vâlcea County, Oltenia, Romania. It is composed of four villages: Crețeni, Izvoru, Mrenești, and Streminoasa.

The commune is located in the southern part of Vâlcea County, 8 km (5 mi) northwest of Drăgășani and 61 km (38 mi) south of the county seat, Râmnicu Vâlcea.

Historical population
Year	Pop.	±%
2002	2,619	—
2011	2,151	−17.9%
2021	1,934	−10.1%
Source: Census data

== Natives ==
- Elena Florica (born 1992), handballer
