= 2018 European Women's Handball Championship squads =

The following is a list of squads for each nation competing at the 2018 European Women's Handball Championship.

On 29 October 2018 every coach had to submit a list of a maximum of 28 players, whom which 16 were selected for the final tournament. Up to six replacements were granted during the tournament. The final squads were released on 28, 29, and 30 November 2018.

Age, caps and goals correct as of 29 November 2018.

== Group A ==
=== Denmark ===
The first 14 players were announced on 8 November 2018. Three players were added on 14 and 17 November 2018. On 30 November, Mathilde Hylleberg was cut from the squad, but was added back on 2 December. However, the next day Line Haugsted replaced her.

Head coach: Klavs Bruun Jørgensen

No.	Pos.	Name	Date of birth (age)	Height	App.	Goals	Club
1	GK	Sandra Toft	18 October 1989 (aged 29)	1.76 m	103	1	(Denmark) Team Esbjerg
3	LW	Lærke Nolsøe	19 February 1996 (aged 22)	1.69 m	13	19	(Denmark) Nykøbing Falster
5	P	Sarah Iversen	10 April 1990 (aged 28)	1.77 m	32	44	(Denmark) Herning-Ikast Håndbold
8	LB	Anne Mette Hansen	25 August 1994 (aged 24)	1.85 m	74	181	(Hungary) Győri ETO
9	LW	Fie Woller	17 September 1992 (aged 26)	1.76 m	54	93	(Germany) SG BBM Bietigheim
10	P	Kathrine Heindahl	26 March 1992 (aged 26)	1.85 m	51	99	(Denmark) Odense Håndbold
11	LB	Line Haugsted	11 November 1994 (aged 24)	1.80 m	32	45	(Denmark) Viborg HK
14	CB	Lotte Grigel	5 April 1991 (aged 27)	1.65 m	91	131	(Hungary) Debreceni VSC
15	CB	Nadia Offendal	22 October 1994 (aged 24)	1.73 m	11	22	(Denmark) Odense Håndbold
17	P	Stine Bodholt Nielsen	8 November 1989 (aged 29)	1.76 m	52	93	(Denmark) Viborg HK
18	RB	Mette Tranborg	1 January 1996 (aged 22)	1.96 m	51	135	(Denmark) Odense Håndbold
21	RW	Mathilde Hylleberg	1 December 1998 (aged 19)	1.69 m	5	8	(Denmark) TTH Holstebro
23	LB	Kristina Jørgensen	17 January 1998 (aged 20)	1.86 m	19	18	(Denmark) Viborg HK
25	RW	Trine Østergaard	17 October 1991 (aged 27)	1.65 m	99	155	(Denmark) Odense Håndbold
28	LB	Stine Jørgensen (c)	3 September 1990 (aged 28)	1.80 m	131	428	(Denmark) Odense Håndbold
31	RB	Anne Cecilie De La Cour	8 December 1993 (aged 24)	1.78 m	27	39	(Denmark) København Håndbold
32	CB	Mie Højlund	24 October 1997 (aged 21)	1.75 m	13	15	(Denmark) Odense Håndbold
40	GK	Althea Reinhardt	8 September 1996 (aged 22)	1.84 m	35	0	(Denmark) Odense Håndbold

=== Poland ===
The squad was announced on 8 November 2018.

Head coach: Leszek Krowicki

No.	Pos.	Name	Date of birth (age)	Height	App.	Goals	Club
7	RW	Aneta Łabuda	7 January 1995 (aged 23)	1.60 m	26	28	(Poland) MKS Lublin
8	RB	Monika Kobylińska	9 April 1995 (aged 23)	1.77 m	50	141	(Germany) TuS Metzingen
11	LW	Kinga Grzyb	12 January 1982 (aged 36)	1.68 m	250	669	(Poland) MKS Zagłębie Lubin
12	GK	Weronika Gawlik	12 October 1986 (aged 32)	1.80 m	80	4	(Poland) MKS Lublin
13	P	Sylwia Matuszczyk	11 June 1992 (aged 26)	1.72 m	7	7	(Poland) MKS Lublin
14	LB	Karolina Kudłacz-Gloc	17 January 1985 (aged 33)	1.77 m	177	904	(Germany) SG BBM Bietigheim
15	RW	Katarzyna Janiszewska	26 October 1995 (aged 23)	1.68 m	57	81	(Germany) SV Union Halle-Neustadt
16	GK	Adrianna Płaczek	10 December 1993 (aged 24)	1.74 m	32	0	(France) Fleury Loiret HB
18	RB	Aleksandra Zych	28 July 1993 (aged 25)	1.86 m	60	60	(France) Metz Handball
20	P	Joanna Drabik	28 October 1993 (aged 25)	1.80 m	66	112	(Hungary) Siófok KC
22	LB	Aleksandra Rosiak	7 July 1997 (aged 21)	1.82 m	10	7	(Poland) MKS Lublin
24	LB	Joanna Wołoszyk	19 January 1995 (aged 23)	1.84 m	26	12	(Poland) Pogoń Baltica Szczecin
31	LB	Sylwia Lisewska	31 May 1986 (aged 32)	1.84 m	35	71	(Romania) Minaur Baia Mare
49	CB	Karolina Kochaniak	5 July 1995 (aged 23)	1.75 m	2	1	(Poland) Pogoń Baltica Szczecin
89	CB	Kinga Achruk	9 January 1989 (aged 29)	1.81 m	175	481	(Poland) MKS Lublin
90	LW	Bogna Sobiech	25 March 1990 (aged 28)	1.68 m	6	6	(Germany) HSG Bensheim/Auerbach
92	RB	Ewa Urtnowska	18 January 1992 (aged 26)	1.85 m	70	36	(Poland) MKS Lublin

=== Serbia ===
A 19-player squad was announced on 13 November 2018.

Head coach: Ljubomir Obradović

No.	Pos.	Name	Date of birth (age)	Height	App.	Goals	Club
2	LW	Sanja Radosavljević	15 January 1994 (aged 24)	1.70 m	54	134	(Hungary) Vác
3	RW	Katarina Krpež Slezak	2 May 1988 (aged 30)	1.68 m	136	337	(Hungary) Érd
7	CB	Andrea Lekić	6 September 1987 (aged 31)	1.78 m	102	520	(Romania) CSM București
8	RB	Dijana Števin	23 October 1986 (aged 32)	1.78 m	79	138	(France) Celles-sur-Belle
9	RB	Jelena Lavko	6 July 1991 (aged 27)	1.84 m	91	165	(Hungary) Érd
10	LB	Jovana Kovačević	9 April 1996 (aged 22)	1.78 m	2	0	(Hungary) Érd
14	RW	Željka Nikolić	12 July 1991 (aged 27)	1.68 m	28	23	(Romania) SCM Craiova
18	CB	Tamara Georgijev	6 September 1992 (aged 26)	1.72 m	50	99	(Hungary) Kisvárda
20	P	Slađana Pop-Lazić	26 July 1988 (aged 30)	1.78 m	79	141	(France) Brest Bretagne
21	LW	Dijana Radojević	2 April 1990 (aged 28)	1.70 m	36	51	(France) Chambray
24	CB	Aleksandra Vukajlović	7 June 1997 (aged 21)	1.70 m	8	25	(Hungary) Békéscsabai Előre
27	GK	Katarina Tomašević	6 February 1984 (aged 34)	1.77 m	88	2	(Hungary) Dunaújvárosi Kohász
33	LB	Jovana Stoiljković	30 September 1988 (aged 30)	1.82 m	81	193	(France) Brest Bretagne
72	P	Dragana Cvijić	15 March 1990 (aged 28)	1.84 m	84	224	(Romania) CSM București
88	GK	Marina Pantić	28 October 1988 (aged 30)	1.83 m	9	0	(France) Le Havre
90	GK	Marija Čolić	12 April 1990 (aged 28)	1.73 m	25	1	(France) OGC Nice
99	RB	Marina Dmitrović	23 March 1985 (aged 33)	1.85 m	99	169	(Romania) Corona Brașov

=== Sweden ===
The squad was announced on 30 October 2018. On 19 November 2018, Mikaela Mässing replaced Johanna Westberg, who missed the tournament due to her pregnancy. On 28 November, Jessica Ryde was added to the extended squad as a 17th player, traveling with the team to France. On 6 December, Elin Hallagård replaced Mathilda Lundström. On 9 December, Lundström re-entered the squad as a replacement for Daniela Gustin, who tore her ACL in the main round match against Montenegro.

Head coach: Henrik Signell

No.	Pos.	Name	Date of birth (age)	Height	App.	Goals	Club
1	GK	Johanna Bundsen	3 June 1991 (aged 27)	1.85 m	76	1	(Denmark) København Håndbold
4	LW	Olivia Mellegård	17 June 1996 (aged 22)	1.78 m	36	71	(Sweden) IK Sävehof
6	CB	Carin Strömberg	10 July 1993 (aged 25)	1.84 m	60	51	(Denmark) Viborg HK
7	P	Linn Blohm	20 May 1992 (aged 26)	1.80 m	79	185	(Denmark) København Håndbold
8	LB	Jamina Roberts	28 May 1990 (aged 28)	1.76 m	142	286	(Denmark) Randers HK
9	LW	Louise Sand	27 December 1992 (aged 25)	1.64 m	98	214	(France) Fleury Loiret HB
10	RW	Mathilda Lundström	20 December 1996 (aged 21)	1.64 m	11	13	(Sweden) Skuru IK
11	RW	Daniela Gustin	11 May 1994 (aged 24)	1.81 m	27	57	(Germany) SG BBM Bietigheim
12	GK	Filippa Idéhn	15 August 1990 (aged 28)	1.83 m	98	2	(France) Brest Bretagne Handball
19	P	Anna Lagerquist	16 October 1993 (aged 25)	1.73 m	34	48	(Denmark) Nykøbing Falster
20	CB	Isabelle Gulldén	29 June 1989 (aged 29)	1.78 m	195	761	(France) Brest Bretagne Handball
22	RB	Hanna Blomstrand	25 August 1996 (aged 22)	1.73 m	39	67	(Denmark) København Håndbold
24	RB	Nathalie Hagman	19 July 1991 (aged 27)	1.67 m	129	387	(Romania) CSM București
25	LB	Mikaela Mässing	13 March 1994 (aged 24)	1.88 m	6	22	(Sweden) H 65 Höör
26	CB	Elin Hallagård	4 January 1989 (aged 29)	1.80 m	5	3	(Sweden) IK Sävehof
27	RB	Sabina Jacobsen	27 March 1989 (aged 29)	1.80 m	123	134	(Romania) CSM București
29	LB	Jenny Alm	10 April 1989 (aged 29)	1.84 m	116	270	(Denmark) København Håndbold

== Group B ==
=== France ===
A 24-player squad was announced on 31 October 2018. The final squad was revealed on 26 November 2018.

Head coach: Olivier Krumbholz

No.	Pos.	Name	Date of birth (age)	Height	App.	Goals	Club
1	GK	Laura Glauser	20 August 1993 (aged 25)	1.78 m	68	0	(France) Metz Handball
4	RW	Pauline Coatanea	6 July 1993 (aged 25)	1.65 m	8	5	(France) Brest Bretagne
5	RB	Camille Ayglon	21 May 1985 (aged 33)	1.80 m	254	532	(France) Nantes
7	CB	Allison Pineau	2 May 1989 (aged 29)	1.81 m	223	557	(France) Brest Bretagne
9	P	Astride N'Gouan	9 July 1991 (aged 27)	1.87 m	22	14	(France) Metz Handball
10	CB	Grâce Zaadi	7 July 1993 (aged 25)	1.71 m	95	118	(France) Metz Handball
12	GK	Amandine Leynaud	2 May 1988 (aged 30)	1.78 m	217	2	(Hungary) Győri ETO
13	LW	Manon Houette	2 July 1992 (aged 26)	1.68 m	78	183	(France) Metz Handball
14	LB	Kalidiatou Niakaté	15 March 1995 (aged 23)	1.77 m	24	31	(France) Nantes
17	LW	Siraba Dembélé Pavlović	28 June 1986 (aged 32)	1.72 m	263	805	(France) Toulon
20	RW	Laura Flippes	13 December 1994 (aged 23)	1.71 m	41	60	(France) Metz Handball
21	LB	Orlane Kanor	16 June 1997 (aged 21)	1.78 m	17	21	(France) Metz Handball
24	P	Béatrice Edwige	3 October 1988 (aged 30)	1.82 m	79	44	(France) Metz Handball
26	P	Pauletta Foppa	22 December 2000 (aged 17)	1.77 m	3	1	(France) Brest Bretagne
27	CB	Estelle Nze Minko	11 August 1991 (aged 27)	1.78 m	87	164	(Hungary) Siófok KC
29	LB	Gnonsiane Niombla	9 July 1990 (aged 28)	1.72 m	91	210	(France) Metz Handball
64	RB	Alexandra Lacrabère	27 April 1987 (aged 31)	1.77 m	217	723	(France) Fleury Loiret HB

=== Montenegro ===
The squad was announced on 9 November 2018.

Head coach: (Sweden) Per Johansson

No.	Pos.	Name	Date of birth (age)	Height	App.	Goals	Club
1	GK	Marina Rajčić	24 August 1993 (aged 25)	1.78 m	105	0	(Montenegro) ŽRK Budućnost
4	RW	Jovanka Radičević	23 October 1986 (aged 32)	1.69 m	142	767	(Romania) CSM București
9	LB	Đurđina Jauković	24 February 1997 (aged 21)	1.85 m	47	126	(Montenegro) ŽRK Budućnost
10	CB	Anđela Bulatović	15 January 1987 (aged 31)	1.75 m	81	73	(Montenegro) ŽRK Budućnost
15	RB	Andrea Klikovac	6 May 1991 (aged 27)	1.80 m	60	26	(Hungary) Kisvárdai KC
16	GK	Ljubica Nenezić	15 January 1997 (aged 21)	1.79 m	12	0	(Turkey) Kastamonu GSK
23	RW	Dijana Ujkić	5 July 1996 (aged 22)	1.72 m	19	25	(Montenegro) ŽRK Budućnost
27	RB	Sanja Premović	27 November 1992 (aged 26)	1.82 m	20	4	(Montenegro) ŽRK Budućnost
32	RB	Katarina Bulatović	15 November 1984 (aged 34)	1.90 m	78	442	(Montenegro) ŽRK Budućnost
34	P	Tatjana Brnović	9 November 1998 (aged 20)	1.83 m	13	22	(Montenegro) ŽRK Budućnost
55	LW	Ivona Pavićević	21 April 1996 (aged 22)	1.67 m	33	18	(Montenegro) ŽRK Budućnost
66	P	Ema Ramusović	28 November 1996 (aged 22)	1.86 m	41	31	(Montenegro) ŽRK Budućnost
77	LW	Majda Mehmedović	25 May 1990 (aged 28)	1.69 m	101	243	(Romania) CSM București
80	CB	Jelena Despotović	30 April 1994 (aged 24)	1.83 m	63	47	(Hungary) Debreceni VSC
90	CB	Milena Raičević	12 March 1990 (aged 28)	1.84 m	138	426	(Montenegro) ŽRK Budućnost
96	LW	Itana Grbić	1 September 1996 (aged 22)	1.69 m	32	38	(Montenegro) ŽRK Budućnost

=== Russia ===
A 22-player squad was announced on 8 November 2018.

Head coach: Yevgeni Trefilov

No.	Pos.	Name	Date of birth (age)	Height	App.	Goals	Club
1	GK	Anna Sedoykina	1 August 1984 (aged 34)	1.84 m	134	4	(Russia) Rostov-Don
2	LW	Polina Kuznetsova	10 June 1987 (aged 31)	1.68 m	136	372	(Russia) Rostov-Don
6	LB	Anna Kochetova	4 May 1987 (aged 31)	1.78 m	68	210	(Russia) HC Astrakhanochka
7	CB	Daria Dmitrieva	9 August 1995 (aged 23)	1.78 m	87	279	(Russia) HC Lada
8	LB	Anna Sen	3 December 1990 (aged 27)	1.86 m	126	297	(Russia) Rostov-Don
13	RW	Anna Vyakhireva	13 March 1995 (aged 23)	1.68 m	71	302	(Russia) Rostov-Don
15	RW	Marina Sudakova	17 February 1989 (aged 29)	1.64 m	88	158	(Russia) Rostov-Don
18	LW	Daria Samokhina	12 August 1992 (aged 26)	1.75 m	35	111	(Russia) HC Astrakhanochka
19	P	Kseniya Makeyeva	19 September 1990 (aged 28)	1.86 m	125	247	(Russia) Rostov-Don
34	CB	Elizaveta Malashenko	26 February 1996 (aged 22)	1.80 m	32	32	(Russia) HC Astrakhanochka
36	RW	Yulia Managarova	27 September 1988 (aged 30)	1.67 m	20	62	(Russia) Rostov-Don
39	RB	Antonina Skorobogatchenko	14 February 1999 (aged 19)	1.82 m	22	59	(Russia) HC Kuban Krasnodar
44	GK	Kira Trusova	28 June 1994 (aged 24)	1.82 m	20	1	(Russia) HC Astrakhanochka
70	P	Maya Petrova	26 May 1982 (aged 36)	1.77 m	77	86	(Russia) Rostov-Don
77	CB	Yaroslava Frolova	18 May 1997 (aged 21)	1.78 m	16	18	(Russia) HC Kuban Krasnodar
78	RB	Irina Snopova	7 June 1995 (aged 23)	1.82 m	6	6	(Russia) HC Astrakhanochka

=== Slovenia ===
A 20-player squad was announced on 12 November 2018.

Head coach: Uroš Bregar

No.	Pos.	Name	Date of birth (age)	Height	App.	Goals	Club
1	GK	Branka Zec	30 October 1986 (aged 32)	1.79 m	50	0	(Germany) Frisch Auf Göppingen
6	RB	Ana Gros	21 January 1991 (aged 27)	1.86 m	89	377	(France) Brest Bretagne Handball
7	P	Taja Čajko	27 July 1993 (aged 25)	1.78 m	2	0	(Slovenia) ŽRK Mlinotest Ajdovščina
8	LB	Lea Krajnc	1 April 1993 (aged 25)	1.75 m	23	15	(Slovenia) RK Zagorje
9	CB	Nina Žabjek	4 March 1998 (aged 20)	1.78 m	10	4	(Slovenia) RK Krim
10	LB	Tjaša Stanko	5 November 1997 (aged 21)	1.73 m	48	99	(Slovenia) RK Krim
11	LB	Ana Abina	30 July 1997 (aged 21)	1.75 m	24	18	(Slovenia) ŽRK Krka
13	LW	Polona Barič	15 May 1992 (aged 26)	1.66 m	20	28	(Slovenia) RK Krim
14	LW	Tamara Mavsar	1 April 1991 (aged 27)	1.73 m	63	53	(Slovenia) RK Krim
15	P	Teja Ferfolja	20 September 1991 (aged 27)	1.83 m	45	36	(Greece) PAOK
16	GK	Maja Vojnović	26 January 1998 (aged 20)	1.80 m	10	0	(Slovenia) RK Krim
18	CB	Nina Zulić	4 December 1995 (aged 22)	1.70 m	25	42	(Slovenia) RK Krim
19	RW	Jasmina Pišek	24 May 1996 (aged 22)	1.66 m	2	4	(Slovenia) ŽRK Celje
23	LB	Hana Vučko	14 November 1998 (aged 20)	1.75 m	11	3	(Slovenia) RK Krim
32	P	Lina Krhlikar	29 June 1989 (aged 29)	1.84 m	56	91	(Germany) Frisch Auf Göppingen
41	P	Aneja Beganovič	7 September 1997 (aged 21)	1.73 m	22	30	(Slovenia) RK Krim
71	LW	Ines Amon	13 July 1992 (aged 26)	1.71 m	25	44	(Slovenia) RK Krim

== Group C ==
=== Croatia ===
The squad was announced on 6 November 2018.

Head coach: Nenad Šoštarić

No.	Pos.	Name	Date of birth (age)	Height	App.	Goals	Club
3	LW	Paula Posavec	26 August 1996 (aged 22)	1.70 m	26	23	(Croatia) RK Zagreb
4	LW	Kristina Plahinek	18 December 1992 (aged 25)	1.64 m	12	18	(Croatia) RK Zagreb
7	CB	Dora Krsnik	19 January 1992 (aged 26)	1.70 m	19	19	(Slovenia) RK Krim
8	CB	Stela Posavec	26 August 1996 (aged 22)	1.68 m	12	26	(Croatia) RK Zagreb
10	RB	Dejana Milosavljević	23 November 1994 (aged 24)	1.73 m	0	0	(Croatia) RK Podravka
12	GK	Ivana Kapitanović	17 September 1994 (aged 24)	1.83 m	28	4	(France) Metz Handball
13	RB	Ana Turk	29 June 1989 (aged 29)	1.69 m	20	27	(Croatia) RK Podravka
14	LB	Larissa Kalaus	24 June 1996 (aged 22)	1.73 m	8	24	(Croatia) RK Zagreb
17	P	Katarina Ježić	19 December 1992 (aged 25)	1.73 m	60	117	(Hungary) Siófok KC
18	CB	Selena Milošević	9 June 1989 (aged 29)	1.75 m	10	7	(Croatia) RK Podravka
30	RB	Ivana Dežić	27 July 1994 (aged 24)	1.79 m	4	4	(Poland) Pogoń Baltica Szczecin
31	P	Ana Debelić	9 January 1994 (aged 24)	1.83 m	22	21	(Croatia) RK Podravka
46	LB	Marina Glavan	4 June 1991 (aged 27)	1.80 m	6	7	(Croatia) RK Zagreb
77	CB	Valentina Blažević	14 February 1994 (aged 24)	1.70 m	22	22	(Poland) Pogoń Baltica Szczecin
88	LB	Kristina Prkačin	21 October 1997 (aged 21)	1.83 m	2	1	(Croatia) RK Zagreb
91	GK	Tea Pijević	18 November 1991 (aged 27)	1.72 m	10	0	(Croatia) RK Zagreb

=== Hungary ===
The squad was announced on 13 November 2018.

Head coach: (Denmark) Kim Rasmussen

No.	Pos.	Name	Date of birth (age)	Height	App.	Goals	Club
4	P	Petra Tóvizi	15 March 1999 (aged 19)	1.74 m	0	0	(Hungary) Debreceni VSC
6	LW	Nadine Schatzl	19 November 1993 (aged 25)	1.73 m	37	91	(Hungary) FTC-Rail Cargo Hungaria
8	CB	Anikó Kovacsics	29 August 1991 (aged 27)	1.70 m	106	216	(Hungary) FTC-Rail Cargo Hungaria
11	CB	Babett Szalai	21 February 1990 (aged 28)	1.75 m	2	0	(Hungary) Dunaújvárosi Kohász KA
16	GK	Blanka Bíró	22 September 1994 (aged 24)	1.83 m	50	1	(Hungary) FTC-Rail Cargo Hungaria
18	RW	Adrienn Orbán	1 October 1986 (aged 32)	1.68 m	39	64	(Hungary) Kisvárdai KC
21	GK	Éva Kiss	10 July 1987 (aged 31)	1.89 m	81	1	(Hungary) Győri ETO
30	CB	Barbara Pálos-Bognár	7 November 1987 (aged 31)	1.76 m	10	7	(Hungary) Budaörs
33	RB	Anna Kovács	24 October 1991 (aged 27)	1.73 m	33	98	(Hungary) Debreceni VSC
34	P	Rea Mészáros	14 April 1994 (aged 24)	1.72 m	40	8	(Hungary) FTC-Rail Cargo Hungaria
42	RB	Szimonetta Planéta	12 December 1993 (aged 24)	1.98 m	44	43	(France) Chambray
43	LW	Anita Kazai	28 May 1988 (aged 30)	1.78 m	1	6	(Hungary) Dunaújvárosi Kohász KA
45	LB	Noémi Háfra	5 October 1998 (aged 20)	1.80 m	17	43	(Hungary) FTC-Rail Cargo Hungaria
66	RW	Viktória Lukács	31 January 1995 (aged 23)	1.69 m	30	50	(Hungary) FTC-Rail Cargo Hungaria
68	P	Laura Szabó	19 November 1997 (aged 21)	1.84 m	7	5	(Hungary) Érd HC
96	CB	Gabriella Tóth	23 September 1996 (aged 22)	1.75 m	27	50	(Hungary) Érd HC
99	CB	Rita Lakatos	6 July 1999 (aged 19)	1.77 m	0	0	(Hungary) GVM Europe-Vác

=== Netherlands ===
A 22-player squad was announced on 26 October 2018. Due to a back injury, Danick Snelder missed the tournament. The final squad was revealed five days later. The Netherlands began the tournament with just 15 players in the squad. However, on 5 December, Lynn Knippenborg was added as the 16th player. On 12 December, Dione Housheer replaced Angela Malestein. On 14 December, Malestein re-entered the squad ahead of the semi-final, replacing Housheer. On 16 December, Inger Smits was added to the squad in replacement of Martine Smeets who left the semi-final against France with a calf injury.

Head coach: (Denmark) Helle Thomsen

No.	Pos.	Name	Date of birth (age)	Height	App.	Goals	Club
5	LB	Jessy Kramer	16 February 1990 (aged 28)	1.77 m	121	91	(France) Toulon
6	RB	Laura van der Heijden	27 June 1990 (aged 28)	1.72 m	189	591	(Germany) SG BBM Bietigheim
7	RW	Debbie Bont	9 December 1990 (aged 27)	1.74 m	145	284	(Denmark) København Håndbold
8	LB	Lois Abbingh	13 August 1992 (aged 26)	1.77 m	130	571	(Russia) Rostov-Don
11	CB	Lynn Knippenborg	7 January 1992 (aged 26)	1.75 m	92	118	(Denmark) TTH Holstebro
14	LB	Delaila Amega	21 September 1997 (aged 21)	1.70 m	12	19	(Germany) TuS Metzingen
15	CB	Maura Visser	1 June 1985 (aged 33)	1.78 m	131	449	(Germany) SG BBM Bietigheim
17	CB	Nycke Groot	4 May 1988 (aged 30)	1.75 m	133	417	(Hungary) Győri ETO KC
18	LB	Kelly Dulfer	21 March 1994 (aged 24)	1.86 m	91	69	(Denmark) København Håndbold
19	P	Merel Freriks	6 January 1998 (aged 20)	1.75 m	7	15	(Germany) HSG Bensheim/Auerbach
20	LB	Inger Smits	17 September 1994 (aged 24)	1.79 m	16	11	(Denmark) TTH Holstebro
24	LW	Martine Smeets	5 May 1990 (aged 28)	1.72 m	89	161	(Norway) Molde Elite
25	RB	Charris Rozemalen	16 April 1991 (aged 27)	1.75 m	16	23	(Germany) SG BBM Bietigheim
26	RW	Angela Malestein	31 January 1993 (aged 25)	1.73 m	122	243	(Germany) SG BBM Bietigheim
27	RB	Dione Housheer	26 September 1999 (aged 19)	1.79 m	8	19	(Denmark) Nykøbing Falster
30	GK	Rinka Duijndam	6 August 1997 (aged 21)	1.73 m	5	0	(Germany) Borussia Dortmund
33	GK	Tess Wester	19 May 1993 (aged 25)	1.78 m	83	7	(Denmark) Odense Håndbold
79	LB	Estavana Polman	5 August 1992 (aged 26)	1.74 m	122	423	(Denmark) Team Esbjerg

=== Spain ===
The squad was announced on 6 November 2018.

Head coach: Carlos Viver

No.	Pos.	Name	Date of birth (age)	Height	App.	Goals	Club
4	RW	Carmen Martín	29 May 1988 (aged 30)	1.68 m	207	707	(France) OGC Nice Côte d'Azur
8	CB	Silvia Arderíus	11 July 1990 (aged 28)	1.69 m	17	29	(Spain) BM Bera Bera
10	P	Elisabet Cesáreo	25 May 1999 (aged 19)	1.77 m	2	0	(Spain) BM Aula
12	GK	Silvia Navarro	20 March 1979 (aged 39)	1.67 m	182	4	(Spain) BM Remudas
16	GK	Mercedes Castellanos	21 July 1988 (aged 30)	1.83 m	23	1	(Spain) BM Bera Bera
17	LW	Jennifer Gutiérrez Bermejo	20 February 1995 (aged 23)	1.69 m	24	60	(Spain) Club Balonmano Elche
19	P	Paula García Ávila	24 March 1992 (aged 26)	1.80 m	26	35	(Romania) Gloria Bistrița
25	CB	Nerea Pena	13 December 1989 (aged 28)	1.75 m	135	434	(Hungary) FTC-Rail Cargo Hungaria
27	LB	Lara González Ortega	22 February 1992 (aged 26)	1.84 m	100	112	(France) ESBF Besançon
30	LW	Soledad López	4 April 1992 (aged 26)	1.62 m	3	11	(Spain) CBF Málaga Costa del Sol
34	CB	Alicia Fernández Fraga	21 December 1992 (aged 25)	1.72 m	13	26	(Romania) SCM Râmnicu Vâlcea
37	LB	Ana Isabel Martínez	7 December 1991 (aged 26)	1.72 m	26	16	(Spain) Club Balonmano Elche
39	RB	Almudena Rodríguez	9 November 1993 (aged 25)	1.75 m	37	58	(Romania) Gloria Bistrița
44	P	Ainhoa Hernández	27 April 1994 (aged 24)	1.78 m	56	54	(Spain) Prosetecnisa Zuazo
50	LW	Sara Gil de la Vega	25 October 1994 (aged 24)	1.68 m	4	12	(Spain) BM Porriño
57	RW	Paula Valdivia	23 December 1995 (aged 22)	1.68 m	13	23	(Spain) Prosetecnisa Zuazo
99	RB	Mireya González	18 July 1991 (aged 27)	1.78 m	52	82	(Hungary) Siófok KC

== Group D ==
=== Czech Republic ===
A 20-player squad was announced on 3 November 2018. The final squad was revealed on 26 November 2018.

Head coach: Jan Bašný

No.	Pos.	Name	Date of birth (age)	Height	App.	Goals	Club
3	RW	Jana Knedlíková	22 June 1989 (aged 29)	1.67 m	95	207	(Hungary) Győri ETO
5	RB	Sára Kovářová	9 February 1999 (aged 19)	1.74 m	2	5	(Czech Republic) DHK Baník Most
7	RB	Helena Ryšánková	19 November 1992 (aged 26)	1.75 m	40	57	(Romania) Minaur Baia Mare
8	P	Michaela Konečná	6 July 1998 (aged 20)	1.80 m	10	6	(Czech Republic) DHC Sokol Poruba
9	LW	Kristýna Mika	13 August 1987 (aged 31)	1.63 m	131	171	(France) Achenheim Truchtersheim
14	LB	Kamila Kordovská	4 December 1997 (aged 20)	1.79 m	39	81	(Germany) HSG Blomberg-Lippe
16	GK	Lucie Satrapová	3 July 1989 (aged 29)	1.83 m	101	2	(France) Paris 92
18	CB	Iveta Luzumová	3 April 1989 (aged 29)	1.76 m	101	423	(Germany) Thüringer HC
21	CB	Veronika Mikulášková	16 October 2000 (aged 18)	1.72 m	2	3	(Czech Republic) DHK Baník Most
25	LB	Jana Šustková	10 January 1998 (aged 20)	1.77 m	4	2	(Czech Republic) DHK Baník Most
27	P	Petra Adámková	21 June 1991 (aged 27)	1.70 m	59	75	(Germany) Frisch Auf Göppingen
28	CB	Šárka Marčíková	12 March 1992 (aged 26)	1.76 m	49	34	(Germany) TV Nellingen
31	P	Alena Šetelíková	22 August 1989 (aged 29)	1.70 m	48	44	(Czech Republic) Sokol Pisek
33	GK	Petra Kudláčková	17 October 1994 (aged 24)	1.73 m	27	1	(Sweden) Kristianstad Handboll
44	RW	Dominika Zachová	4 June 1996 (aged 22)	1.75 m	18	26	(Czech Republic) DHK Baník Most
51	LB	Markéta Jeřábková	8 February 1996 (aged 22)	1.74 m	44	176	(Hungary) Érd HC
67	LW	Veronika Malá	6 May 1994 (aged 24)	1.70 m	50	131	(France) Paris 92

=== Germany ===
The squad was announced on 7 November 2018. Mia Zschocke replaced Kim Naidzinavicius, who suffered a torn meniscus and missed the tournament.

Head coach: (Netherlands) Henk Groener

No.	Pos.	Name	Date of birth (age)	Height	App.	Goals	Club
2	RW	Marlene Zapf	6 January 1990 (aged 28)	1.70 m	70	165	(Germany) TuS Metzingen
3	RW	Amelie Berger	22 July 1999 (aged 19)	1.70 m	0	0	(Germany) Bayer Leverkusen
4	CB	Alina Grijseels	12 April 1996 (aged 22)	1.74 m	9	13	(Germany) Borussia Dortmund
7	P	Meike Schmelzer	19 July 1993 (aged 25)	1.80 m	38	28	(Germany) Thüringer HC
11	LB	Xenia Smits	22 April 1994 (aged 24)	1.82 m	48	109	(France) Metz Handball
12	GK	Dinah Eckerle	16 October 1995 (aged 23)	1.70 m	28	1	(Germany) SG BBM Bietigheim
13	P	Julia Behnke	28 March 1993 (aged 25)	1.80 m	56	80	(Germany) TuS Metzingen
16	GK	Isabell Roch	26 July 1990 (aged 28)	1.77 m	9	0	(Germany) TuS Metzingen
18	CB	Mia Zschocke	28 May 1998 (aged 20)	1.78 m	1	1	(Germany) Bayer Leverkusen
20	LB	Emily Bölk	26 April 1998 (aged 20)	1.82 m	31	77	(Germany) Thüringer HC
21	LW	Ina Großmann	21 August 1990 (aged 28)	1.70 m	10	16	(Germany) Thüringer HC
22	RB	Maren Weigel	22 May 1994 (aged 24)	1.77 m	10	14	(Germany) TuS Metzingen
26	LW	Angie Geschke	24 May 1985 (aged 33)	1.78 m	104	191	(Germany) VfL Oldenburg
28	LW	Franziska Müller	12 March 1990 (aged 28)	1.75 m	26	51	(Germany) HSG Blomberg-Lippe
33	P	Luisa Schulze	14 September 1990 (aged 28)	1.90 m	73	97	(Germany) SG BBM Bietigheim
37	RB	Alicia Stolle	17 June 1996 (aged 22)	1.82 m	31	36	(Germany) Thüringer HC

=== Norway ===
The squad was announced on 6 November 2018. On 21 November, Silje Waade and Ingvild Bakkerud were added in an extended squad, traveling to France with the team. On 26 November, Amanda Kurtović had to withdraw from the squad due to an ACL injury sustained at the Møbelringen Cup, with Silje Waade replacing her. On 4 December, Camilla Herrem replaced Thea Mørk in the squad due to an injury in Mørk's hamstring muscle.

Head coach: (Iceland) Thorir Hergeirsson

No.	Pos.	Name	Date of birth (age)	Height	App.	Goals	Club
2	LB/CB	Henny Reistad	9 February 1999 (aged 19)	1.81 m	3	3	(Norway) Vipers Kristiansand
3	LB	Emilie Hegh Arntzen	1 January 1994 (aged 24)	1.83 m	77	90	(Norway) Vipers Kristiansand
4	LB	Veronica Kristiansen	10 July 1990 (aged 28)	1.75 m	123	412	(Hungary) Győri ETO
6	P	Heidi Løke	12 December 1982 (aged 35)	1.73 m	194	720	(Norway) Storhamar HE
8	RB	Silje Waade	20 March 1994 (aged 24)	1.83 m	19	17	(Norway) Vipers Kristiansand
10	CB	Stine Bredal Oftedal	25 September 1991 (aged 27)	1.67 m	162	385	(Hungary) Győri ETO
11	RW	Malin Aune	4 March 1995 (aged 23)	1.65 m	33	31	(Norway) Vipers Kristiansand
12	GK	Silje Solberg	16 June 1990 (aged 28)	1.78 m	119	1	(Hungary) Siófok KC
13	P	Kari Brattset	15 February 1991 (aged 27)	1.83 m	37	75	(Hungary) Győri ETO
15	RB	Linn Jørum Sulland	15 July 1984 (aged 34)	1.78 m	186	559	(Norway) Vipers Kristiansand
16	GK	Katrine Lunde	30 March 1980 (aged 38)	1.80 m	289	3	(Norway) Vipers Kristiansand
23	LW	Camilla Herrem	8 October 1986 (aged 32)	1.66 m	223	600	(Norway) Sola HK
24	LW	Sanna Solberg	16 June 1990 (aged 28)	1.78 m	120	213	(Denmark) Team Esbjerg
25	LW	Thea Mørk	5 April 1991 (aged 27)	1.70 m	17	35	(Denmark) København Håndbold
26	CB	Marta Tomac	20 September 1990 (aged 28)	1.79 m	43	45	(Norway) Vipers Kristiansand
27	RW	Marit Røsberg Jacobsen	25 February 1994 (aged 24)	1.64 m	34	63	(Denmark) Team Esbjerg
51	P	Vilde Ingstad	18 December 1994 (aged 23)	1.78 m	61	44	(Denmark) Team Esbjerg

=== Romania ===
The squad was announced on 12 November 2018. A broken hand sidelined previously selected Ana Maria Țicu. Cristina Zamfir and Laura Pristăviță also missed the tournament, and were replaced by Anca Polocoșer and Mădălina Zamfirescu respectively. Eventually Cristina Neagu got injured before the semifinal match and was replaced by Bianca Bazaliu.

Head coach: (Spain) Ambros Martín

No.	Pos.	Name	Date of birth (age)	Height	App.	Goals	Club
2	RW	Aneta Udriștioiu	22 June 1989 (aged 29)	1.65 m	44	51	(Romania) CSM București
5	RB	Melinda Geiger	28 March 1987 (aged 31)	1.74 m	105	250	(Hungary) Siófok KC
7	CB	Eliza Buceschi	31 August 1993 (aged 25)	1.77 m	67	178	(Romania) Corona Brașov
8	LB	Cristina Neagu (C)	26 August 1988 (aged 30)	1.80 m	181	728	(Romania) CSM București
11	LB	Gabriela Perianu	20 June 1994 (aged 24)	1.88 m	46	51	(Hungary) Siófok KC
13	CB	Cristina Laslo	10 April 1996 (aged 22)	1.76 m	27	17	(Montenegro) ŽRK Budućnost
15	LW	Valentina Ardean-Elisei	5 June 1982 (aged 36)	1.71 m	247	898	(Romania) Gloria Bistrița
16	GK	Denisa Dedu	27 September 1994 (aged 24)	1.81 m	39	2	(Hungary) Siófok KC
20	GK	Iulia Dumanska	15 August 1996 (aged 22)	1.78 m	26	0	(Romania) SCM Râmnicu Vâlcea
21	P	Crina Pintea	3 April 1990 (aged 28)	1.92 m	60	71	(France) Paris 92
22	LW	Elena Florica	11 May 1992 (aged 26)	1.70 m	27	15	(Romania) SCM Râmnicu Vâlcea
24	P	Daniela Rațiu	14 September 1988 (aged 30)	1.75 m	4	4	(Romania) Gloria Bistrița
26	LB	Anca Polocoșer	1 May 1997 (aged 21)	1.80 m	0	0	(Romania) Minaur Baia-Mare
27	P	Raluca Băcăoanu	2 May 1989 (aged 29)	1.77 m	8	7	(Romania) SCM Râmnicu Vâlcea
31	CB	Mădălina Zamfirescu	31 October 1994 (aged 24)	1.80 m	24	34	(Hungary) Debreceni VSC
89	RW	Laura Chiper	21 August 1989 (aged 29)	1.73 m	73	75	(Romania) Corona Brașov
90	RB	Ana Maria Dragut	24 February 1990 (aged 28)	1.86 m	24	29	(Hungary) Kisvárdai KC
97	LB	Bianca Bazaliu	30 July 1997 (aged 21)	1.83 m	5	2	(Romania) CSM București

== Statistics ==
=== Coaches representation by country ===
Coaches in bold represent their own country.

Number	Country	Coaches
3	Denmark	**Klavs Bruun Jørgensen**, Kim Rasmussen (Hungary), Helle Thomsen (Netherlands)
2	Spain	Ambros Martín (Romania), **Carlos Viver**
2	Sweden	Per Johansson (Montenegro), **Henrik Signell**
1	Croatia	**Nenad Šoštarić**
1	Czech Republic	**Jan Bašný**
1	France	**Olivier Krumbholz**
1	Iceland	Thorir Hergeirsson (Norway)
1	Netherlands	Henk Groener (Germany)
1	Poland	**Leszek Krowicki**
1	Russia	**Yevgeni Trefilov**
1	Serbia	**Ljubomir Obradović**
1	Slovenia	**Uroš Bregar**
