= 2026–27 Women's EHF European League qualification round =

Handball tournament qualifier

Women's EHF European League qualification round
- 2026–27

Tournament information
- Sport: Handball
- Date: 3 October – 15 November 2026
- Teams: 40

Tournament statistics
- Matches played: 60

External videos
- 2026–27 Women's EHF European League qualification round – Draw
- Draw Live Stream

The 2026–27 Women's EHF European League qualification round decided the last twelve qualifiers for the European League group stage.

Due to the changes in the women's competitions next season. This was the final season to have a qualification round.

== Format ==
In round 2, 36 teams are separated into eighteen home and away play offs. The eighteen aggregate winners advance to Round 3. In round 3, twenty four teams are divided into twelve home and away play offs. The twelve winners on aggregate advance to the group stage.

== Teams ==
Round 3
(Germany) HSG Bensheim/Auerbach	(Romania) HC Dunărea Brăila	(Hungary) MOL Esztergom	(Spain) Super Amara Bera Bera
(Spain) CBF Málaga Costa del Sol	(Croatia) RK Lokomotiva Zagreb	(Poland) KGHM MKS Zagłębie Lubin	(Czech Republic) Házená Kynžvart
Round 2
(Denmark) Viborg HK	(Germany) Vfl Oldenburg	(Germany) TuS Metzingen	(Norway) Molde Elite
(Norway) Larvik HK	(Norway) Tertnes Bergen	(Romania) CS Corona Brașov	(Romania) SCM Râmnicu Vâlcea
(France) Chambray Touraine Handball	(France) St Amand HB-Porte du Hainaut	(France) OGC Nice Côte d'Azur Handball	(Hungary) Vác
(Spain) Rocasa Gran Canaria	(Spain) CB Atlético Guardés	(Croatia) ŽRK Zrinski Čakovec	(Croatia) ŽRK Bjelovar
(Poland) PGE MKS El-Volt Lublin	(Poland) KRASON MKS Piotrcovia PT	(Sweden) IK Sävehof	(Sweden) Skara HF
(Sweden) Boden Handboll IF	(Switzerland) GC Amicitia Zürich	(Switzerland) LC Brühl Handball	(Czech Republic) DHK Baník Most
(Serbia) ŽRK Crvena zvezda	(Serbia) ŽRK Naisa Niš	(Turkey) Bursa Büyükşehir BSK	(Austria) Hypo Niederösterreich
(North Macedonia) HC Gjorche Petrov-WHC AD Skopje	(Portugal) SL Benfica	(Greece) AC PAOK	(Greece) AEK Athens

== Round 2 ==
=== Draw ===
The draw for the qualification round was conducted on 14 July 2026 in Vienna, Austria. The seeding was based off the newly created EHF women's club rankings. The bold text indicate which teams advanced.

Key to colours
Teams advancing to the **Round 3**

Seeded
Team	Rank	Points
(Denmark) Viborg HK	37	80
(France) Chambray Touraine Handball	38	69
(Norway) Larvik HK	39	69
(Poland) PGE MKS El-Volt Lublin	40	63
(Spain) CB Atlético Guardés	41	59
(Romania) SCM Râmnicu Vâlcea	42	59
(Sweden) IK Sävehof	43	57
(Turkey) Bursa Büyükşehir BSK	47	51
(Germany) Vfl Oldenburg	48	48
(Hungary) Vác	49	48
(Greece) AC PAOK	50	47
(Portugal) SL Benfica	52	43
(Spain) Rocasa Gran Canaria	54	39
(Romania) CS Corona Brașov	55	39
(North Macedonia) HC Gjorche Petrov-WHC AD Skopje	57	37
(Norway) Tertnes Bergen	58	36

Unseeded
Team	Rank	Points
(Switzerland) LC Brühl Handball	63	31
(Czech Republic) DHK Baník Most	66	30
(Norway) Molde Elite	67	28
(Serbia) ŽRK Crvena zvezda	88	17
(Croatia) ŽRK Bjelovar	89	16
(Croatia) ŽRK Zrinski Čakovec	97	14
(Germany) TuS Metzingen	97	14
(Switzerland) GC Amicitia Zürich	100	13
(Greece) AEK Athens	128	6
(Austria) Hypo Niederösterreich	133	5
(Sweden) Skara HF	141	3
(France) St Amand HB-Porte du Hainaut	N/A	
(France) OGC Nice Côte d'Azur Handball	N/A	
(Poland) KRASON MKS Piotrcovia PT	N/A	
(Sweden) Boden Handboll IF	N/A	
(Serbia) ŽRK Naisa Niš	N/A	

=== Summary ===
There were 32 teams participating in round 2. The first legs were played on 4–5 October and the second legs were played on 10–11 October 2026.

Team 1	Agg.	Team 2	1st leg	2nd leg
**Boden Handboll IF** (Sweden)	61–54	(Spain) CB Atlético Guardés	30–28	31–26
**SCM Râmnicu Vâlcea** (Romania)	68–52	(Germany) TuS Metzingen	39–24	29–28
**SL Benfica** (Portugal)	72–37	(Croatia) ŽRK Zrinski Čakovec	31–16	41–21
**Viborg HK** (Denmark)	72–41	(Greece) AEK Athens	42–24	30–17
Hypo Niederösterreich (Austria)	51–69	(Sweden) **IK Sävehof**	27–31	24–38
**ŽRK Naisa Niš** (Serbia)	61–56	(Turkey) Bursa Büyükşehir BSK	29–28	32–28
**Molde Elite** (Norway)	56–45	(Greece) AC PAOK	27–24	29–21
ŽRK Bjelovar (Croatia)	38–72	(France) **Chambray Touraine Handball**	25–37	13–35
**St Amand HB-Porte du Hainaut** (France)	59–56	(Hungary) Vác	32–30	27–26
OGC Nice Côte d'Azur Handball (France)	60–61	(Norway) **Larvik HK**	28–27	32–34
Skara HF (Sweden)	53–62	(Norway) **Tertnes Bergen**	25–29	28–33
**CS Corona Brașov** (Romania)	58–53	(Serbia) ŽRK Crvena zvezda	32–25	26–28
GC Amicitia Zürich (Switzerland)	45–54	(Germany) **Vfl Oldenburg**	22–31	23–23
**PGE MKS El-Volt Lublin** (Poland)	68–51	(Poland) KRASON MKS Piotrcovia PT	36–24	32–27
Gjorche Petrov-WHC AD Skopje (North Macedonia)	39–45	(Czech Republic) **DHK Baník Most**	22–18	17–27
**Rocasa Gran Canaria** (Spain)	58–56	(Switzerland) LC Brühl Handball	33–25	25–31

==== Matches ====
3 October 2026; 12:00	**Boden Handboll IF (Sweden)**	**30–28**	**(Spain) CB Atlético Guardés**	Pabellón municipal de A Sangriña, Pontevedra; Attendance: 400; Referees: Braganca, Xavier (POR)
3 October 2026; 12:00	Andersson 6	(17–15)	Serrano 11	Pabellón municipal de A Sangriña, Pontevedra; Attendance: 400; Referees: Braganca, Xavier (POR)
3 October 2026; 12:00	5× (suspension)	Report	1× (yellow card) 2× (suspension)	Pabellón municipal de A Sangriña, Pontevedra; Attendance: 400; Referees: Braganca, Xavier (POR)

4 October 2026; 12:00	**CB Atlético Guardés (Spain)**	**26–31**	**(Sweden) Boden Handboll IF**	Pabellón municipal de A Sangriña, Pontevedra; Attendance: 450; Referees: Braganca, Xavier (POR)
4 October 2026; 12:00	Cacheda, Palomo 4	(13–18)	Lagdumzija 8	Pabellón municipal de A Sangriña, Pontevedra; Attendance: 450; Referees: Braganca, Xavier (POR)
4 October 2026; 12:00	1× (yellow card) 6× (suspension) 1× (red card)	Report	3× (suspension)	Pabellón municipal de A Sangriña, Pontevedra; Attendance: 450; Referees: Braganca, Xavier (POR)

Boden Handboll IF won 61–54 on aggregate.

3 October 2026; 15:00	**SCM Râmnicu Vâlcea (Romania)**	**39–24**	**(Germany) TuS Metzingen**	Traian Sports Hall, Râmnicu Vâlcea; Attendance: 1,371; Referees: Heddid, Picot (FRA)
3 October 2026; 15:00	Sprengers, Wulff 6	(19–11)	Farkas 9	Traian Sports Hall, Râmnicu Vâlcea; Attendance: 1,371; Referees: Heddid, Picot (FRA)
3 October 2026; 15:00	1× (suspension)	Report	1× (yellow card) 5× (suspension)	Traian Sports Hall, Râmnicu Vâlcea; Attendance: 1,371; Referees: Heddid, Picot (FRA)

10 October 2026; 19:30	**TuS Metzingen (Germany)**	**28–29**	**(Romania) SCM Râmnicu Vâlcea**	Öschhalle, Metzingen; Attendance: 551; Referees: G. Bujupi, G. Bujupi (KOS)
10 October 2026; 19:30	Cholevová, Sabatnig 5	(16–13)	Høve 6	Öschhalle, Metzingen; Attendance: 551; Referees: G. Bujupi, G. Bujupi (KOS)
10 October 2026; 19:30	3× (suspension)	Report	2× (yellow card) 2× (suspension)	Öschhalle, Metzingen; Attendance: 551; Referees: G. Bujupi, G. Bujupi (KOS)

SCM Râmnicu Vâlcea won 68–52 on aggregate.

3 October 2026; 16:00	**SL Benfica (Portugal)**	**31–16**	**(Croatia) ŽRK Zrinski Čakovec**	Pavilhão da Luz Nᵒ 2, Lisbon; Attendance: 322; Referees: Persis, Radcenko (LAT)
3 October 2026; 16:00	Sequeira 6	(18–6)	Petika 5	Pavilhão da Luz Nᵒ 2, Lisbon; Attendance: 322; Referees: Persis, Radcenko (LAT)
3 October 2026; 16:00	3× (suspension)	Report	1× (yellow card) 5× (suspension) 1× (red card)	Pavilhão da Luz Nᵒ 2, Lisbon; Attendance: 322; Referees: Persis, Radcenko (LAT)

10 October 2026; 19:00	**ŽRK Zrinski Čakovec (Croatia)**	**21–41**	**(Portugal) SL Benfica**	Graditeljska Škola Čakovec, Čakovec; Attendance: 377; Referees: Dasic, Husomanovic (NOR)
10 October 2026; 19:00	Rumek 6	(10–19)	Bernardino 8	Graditeljska Škola Čakovec, Čakovec; Attendance: 377; Referees: Dasic, Husomanovic (NOR)
10 October 2026; 19:00		Report	2× (suspension)	Graditeljska Škola Čakovec, Čakovec; Attendance: 377; Referees: Dasic, Husomanovic (NOR)

SL Benfica won 72–37 on aggregate.

3 October 2026; 16:00	**Viborg HK (Denmark)**	**42–24**	**(Greece) AEK Athens**	BioCirc Arena, Viborg; Attendance: 450; Referees: Hardarson, Magnusson (ISL)
3 October 2026; 16:00	Baumann, Østergaard 6	(19–11)	Paizinho, Zeneli 6	BioCirc Arena, Viborg; Attendance: 450; Referees: Hardarson, Magnusson (ISL)
3 October 2026; 16:00	1× (yellow card) 1× (suspension)	Report	1× (yellow card) 6× (suspension) 1× (red card)	BioCirc Arena, Viborg; Attendance: 450; Referees: Hardarson, Magnusson (ISL)

4 October 2026; 16:00	**AEK Athens (Greece)**	**17–30**	**(Denmark) Viborg HK**	BioCirc Arena, Viborg; Attendance: 192; Referees: Hardarson, Magnusson (ISL)
4 October 2026; 16:00	Zeneli 4	(6–16)	Valle Dahl 5	BioCirc Arena, Viborg; Attendance: 192; Referees: Hardarson, Magnusson (ISL)
4 October 2026; 16:00	4× (suspension)	Report	1× (yellow card) 5× (suspension)	BioCirc Arena, Viborg; Attendance: 192; Referees: Hardarson, Magnusson (ISL)

Viborg HK won 72–41 on aggregate.

3 October 2026; 18:00	**Hypo Niederösterreich (Austria)**	**27–31**	**(Sweden) IK Sävehof**	BSFZ Südstadt, Maria Enzersdorf; Attendance: 300; Referees: Cazan, Suliman (ROU)
3 October 2026; 18:00	three players 5	(14–16)	Þorkelsdóttir 8	BSFZ Südstadt, Maria Enzersdorf; Attendance: 300; Referees: Cazan, Suliman (ROU)
3 October 2026; 18:00	2× (suspension)	Report	5× (suspension) 1× (red card)	BSFZ Südstadt, Maria Enzersdorf; Attendance: 300; Referees: Cazan, Suliman (ROU)

11 October 2026; 16:00	**IK Sävehof (Sweden)**	**38–24**	**(Austria) Hypo Niederösterreich**	Partille Arena, Partille; Attendance: 420; Referees: Härgin, Makejev (EST)
11 October 2026; 16:00	Sembe 7	(17–15)	Brezenci 9	Partille Arena, Partille; Attendance: 420; Referees: Härgin, Makejev (EST)
11 October 2026; 16:00	2× (suspension)	Report	5× (suspension)	Partille Arena, Partille; Attendance: 420; Referees: Härgin, Makejev (EST)

IK Sävehof won 69–51 on aggregate.

3 October 2026; 18:00	**ŽRK Naisa Niš (Serbia)**	**29–28**	**(Turkey) Bursa Büyükşehir BSK**	Sportska hala Miroslav Antić, Niš; Attendance: 353; Referees: Martinovic, Pavicevic (MNE)
3 October 2026; 18:00	Aćimović, Mandić 9	(13–11)	Sormaz 13	Sportska hala Miroslav Antić, Niš; Attendance: 353; Referees: Martinovic, Pavicevic (MNE)
3 October 2026; 18:00	6× (suspension)	Report	1× (yellow card) 1× (suspension) 1× (red card)	Sportska hala Miroslav Antić, Niš; Attendance: 353; Referees: Martinovic, Pavicevic (MNE)

10 October 2026; 16:00	**Bursa Büyükşehir BSK (Turkey)**	**28–32**	**(Serbia) ŽRK Naisa Niš**	THF Serdar Seymen Handball Hall, Beykoz; Attendance: 150; Referees: Yovchev, Yonchev (BUL)
10 October 2026; 16:00	João 12	(17–17)	Ćetković 12	THF Serdar Seymen Handball Hall, Beykoz; Attendance: 150; Referees: Yovchev, Yonchev (BUL)
10 October 2026; 16:00	1× (yellow card) 3× (suspension)	Report	4× (suspension)	THF Serdar Seymen Handball Hall, Beykoz; Attendance: 150; Referees: Yovchev, Yonchev (BUL)

ŽRK Naisa Niš won 61–56 on aggregate.

3 October 2026; 18:00	**Molde Elite (Norway)**	**27–24**	**(Greece) AC PAOK**	Molde Arena, Molde; Attendance: 359; Referees: Watson, Welin (SWE)
3 October 2026; 18:00	Nypan 8	(12–11)	Tsàkalou 8	Molde Arena, Molde; Attendance: 359; Referees: Watson, Welin (SWE)
3 October 2026; 18:00	2× (suspension)	Report	2× (suspension)	Molde Arena, Molde; Attendance: 359; Referees: Watson, Welin (SWE)

10 October 2026; 18:00	**AC PAOK (Greece)**	**21–29**	**(Norway) Molde Elite**	Municipal Sports Center Lefkovrysi, Lefkovrysi; Attendance: 1,150; Referees: Bosnjak, Maric (BIH)
10 October 2026; 18:00	Premovic 6	(9–15)	Kamburce 7	Municipal Sports Center Lefkovrysi, Lefkovrysi; Attendance: 1,150; Referees: Bosnjak, Maric (BIH)
10 October 2026; 18:00		Report	4× (suspension)	Municipal Sports Center Lefkovrysi, Lefkovrysi; Attendance: 1,150; Referees: Bosnjak, Maric (BIH)

Molde Elite won 56–45 on aggregate.

3 October 2026; 19:00	**ŽRK Bjelovar (Croatia)**	**25–37**	**(France) Chambray Touraine Handball**	Dvorana Europskih Prvaka, Bjelovar; Attendance: 1,000; Referees: M. Ilievski, M. Ilievski (MKD)
3 October 2026; 19:00	Petrović, Kruljac 4	(14–21)	Amelot 9	Dvorana Europskih Prvaka, Bjelovar; Attendance: 1,000; Referees: M. Ilievski, M. Ilievski (MKD)
3 October 2026; 19:00	6× (suspension) 1× (red card)	Report	9× (suspension) 1× (red card)	Dvorana Europskih Prvaka, Bjelovar; Attendance: 1,000; Referees: M. Ilievski, M. Ilievski (MKD)

10 October 2026; 20:00	**Chambray Touraine Handball (France)**	**35–13**	**(Croatia) ŽRK Bjelovar**	Gymnase de la Fontaine Blanche, Chambray-lès-Tours; Attendance: 800; Referees: P. Geraets, R. Geraets (NED)
10 October 2026; 20:00	Messi 7	(20–7)	three players 2	Gymnase de la Fontaine Blanche, Chambray-lès-Tours; Attendance: 800; Referees: P. Geraets, R. Geraets (NED)
10 October 2026; 20:00	1× (yellow card) 2× (suspension)	Report	4× (suspension)	Gymnase de la Fontaine Blanche, Chambray-lès-Tours; Attendance: 800; Referees: P. Geraets, R. Geraets (NED)

Chambray Touraine Handball won 72–38 on aggregate.

3 October 2026; 19:30	**St Amand HB-Porte du Hainaut (France)**	**32–30**	**(Hungary) Vác**	Salle Maurice Hugot, Saint-Amand-les-Eaux; Attendance: 1,096; Referees: Klompers, Stobbe (NED)
3 October 2026; 19:30	Abdellahi, Koestner 8	(17–12)	Kacsó, Keceli-Mészáros 7	Salle Maurice Hugot, Saint-Amand-les-Eaux; Attendance: 1,096; Referees: Klompers, Stobbe (NED)
3 October 2026; 19:30	3× (suspension)	Report	1× (yellow card) 5× (suspension) 1× (red card)	Salle Maurice Hugot, Saint-Amand-les-Eaux; Attendance: 1,096; Referees: Klompers, Stobbe (NED)

10 October 2026; 14:00	**Vác (Hungary)**	**26–27**	**(France) St Amand HB-Porte du Hainaut**	Városi Sportcsarnok, Vác; Attendance: 600; Referees: Nygaard, Primdahl (DEN)
10 October 2026; 14:00	Kellermann 7	(12–11)	Técher 6	Városi Sportcsarnok, Vác; Attendance: 600; Referees: Nygaard, Primdahl (DEN)
10 October 2026; 14:00	5× (suspension)	Report	1× (yellow card) 5× (suspension)	Városi Sportcsarnok, Vác; Attendance: 600; Referees: Nygaard, Primdahl (DEN)

St Amand HB-Porte du Hainaut won 59–56 on aggregate.

3 October 2026; 20:00	**OGC Nice Côte d'Azur Handball (France)**	**28–27**	**(Norway) Larvik HK**	Halle des sports Charles-Ehrmann, Nice; Attendance: 700; Referees: Panetta, Riello (ITA)
3 October 2026; 20:00	Benezeth 8	(15–14)	Sæteren 8	Halle des sports Charles-Ehrmann, Nice; Attendance: 700; Referees: Panetta, Riello (ITA)
3 October 2026; 20:00	3× (suspension)	Report	2× (suspension)	Halle des sports Charles-Ehrmann, Nice; Attendance: 700; Referees: Panetta, Riello (ITA)

10 October 2026; 18:00	**Larvik HK (Norway)**	**34–32**	**(France) OGC Nice Côte d'Azur Handball**	Jotron Arena Larvik, Larvik; Attendance: 699; Referees: Härgin, Makejev (EST)
10 October 2026; 18:00	Kurtović 10	(13–10)	Pontoppidan 7	Jotron Arena Larvik, Larvik; Attendance: 699; Referees: Härgin, Makejev (EST)
10 October 2026; 18:00	1× (yellow card) 3× (suspension)	Report	3× (suspension)	Jotron Arena Larvik, Larvik; Attendance: 699; Referees: Härgin, Makejev (EST)

Larvik HK won 61–60 on aggregate.

4 October 2026; 15:00	**Skara HF (Sweden)**	**25–29**	**(Norway) Tertnes Bergen**	Skara Idrottshall, Skara; Attendance: 529; Referees: Brodic, Hodzic (CRO)
4 October 2026; 15:00	van Kerkvoorde 6	(13–17)	Frei, Hagen 7	Skara Idrottshall, Skara; Attendance: 529; Referees: Brodic, Hodzic (CRO)
4 October 2026; 15:00	2× (suspension)	Report	1× (suspension)	Skara Idrottshall, Skara; Attendance: 529; Referees: Brodic, Hodzic (CRO)

11 October 2026; 16:00	**Tertnes Bergen (Norway)**	**33–28**	**(Sweden) Skara HF**	Åsane Arena, Bergen; Attendance: 318; Referees: Kinnari, Skogberg (FIN)
11 October 2026; 16:00	Hagen 6	(18–11)	Felber 6	Åsane Arena, Bergen; Attendance: 318; Referees: Kinnari, Skogberg (FIN)
11 October 2026; 16:00	1× (yellow card) 2× (suspension) 1× (red card)	Report	4× (suspension)	Åsane Arena, Bergen; Attendance: 318; Referees: Kinnari, Skogberg (FIN)

Tertnes Bergen won 62–53 on aggregate.

4 October 2026; 16:00	**CS Corona Brașov (Romania)**	**32–25**	**(Serbia) ŽRK Crvena zvezda**	Sala Sporturilor Dumitru Popescu Colibași, Brașov; Attendance: 1,357; Referees: Heddid, Picot (FRA)
4 October 2026; 16:00	Makeyeva 6	(13–13)	Klein, Simić 6	Sala Sporturilor Dumitru Popescu Colibași, Brașov; Attendance: 1,357; Referees: Heddid, Picot (FRA)
4 October 2026; 16:00	3× (suspension)	Report	2× (suspension)	Sala Sporturilor Dumitru Popescu Colibași, Brașov; Attendance: 1,357; Referees: Heddid, Picot (FRA)

10 October 2026; 19:00	**ŽRK Crvena zvezda (Serbia)**	**28–26**	**(Romania) CS Corona Brașov**	Sports center prof.dr Branislav Pokrajac, Belgrade; Attendance: 1,100; Referees: Fahner, Kubis (POL)
10 October 2026; 19:00	Stamenić 7	(16–15)	Balsam 6	Sports center prof.dr Branislav Pokrajac, Belgrade; Attendance: 1,100; Referees: Fahner, Kubis (POL)
10 October 2026; 19:00	1× (yellow card) 3× (suspension)	Report	2× (yellow card) 7× (suspension)	Sports center prof.dr Branislav Pokrajac, Belgrade; Attendance: 1,100; Referees: Fahner, Kubis (POL)

CS Corona Brașov won 58–53 on aggregate.

4 October 2026; 15:00	**GC Amicitia Zürich (Switzerland)**	**22–31**	**(Germany) VfL Oldenburg**	Saalsporthalle, Zürich; Attendance: 400; Referees: Cournil, Lamour (FRA)
4 October 2026; 15:00	Schärer 7	(11–18)	Teiken 11	Saalsporthalle, Zürich; Attendance: 400; Referees: Cournil, Lamour (FRA)
4 October 2026; 15:00	1× (suspension)	Report		Saalsporthalle, Zürich; Attendance: 400; Referees: Cournil, Lamour (FRA)

11 October 2026; 16:30	**VfL Oldenburg (Germany)**	**23–23**	**(Switzerland) GC Amicitia Zürich**	EWE Arena, Oldenburg; Attendance: 984; Referees: Kaplinsky, Pinker (ISR)
11 October 2026; 16:30	Reinemann 8	(12–11)	Winterberg 8	EWE Arena, Oldenburg; Attendance: 984; Referees: Kaplinsky, Pinker (ISR)
11 October 2026; 16:30	2× (suspension)	Report	1× (suspension)	EWE Arena, Oldenburg; Attendance: 984; Referees: Kaplinsky, Pinker (ISR)

VfL Oldenburg won 54–45 on aggregate.

4 October 2026; 18:00	**PGE MKS El-Volt Lublin (Poland)**	**36–24**	**(Poland) KRASON MKS Piotrcovia PT**	Globus Hall, Lublin; Attendance: 2,040; Referees: Berdic, Sorak (SRB)
4 October 2026; 18:00	Paulsen 12	(18–14)	Nosek 6	Globus Hall, Lublin; Attendance: 2,040; Referees: Berdic, Sorak (SRB)
4 October 2026; 18:00	4× (suspension)	Report	1× (yellow card) 4× (suspension)	Globus Hall, Lublin; Attendance: 2,040; Referees: Berdic, Sorak (SRB)

11 October 2026; 16:00	**KRASON MKS Piotrcovia PT (Poland)**	**27–32**	**(Poland) PGE MKS El-Volt Lublin**	Hala Relax, Piotrków Trybunalski; Attendance: 450; Referees: Loshak, Shnyt (UKR)
11 October 2026; 16:00	Roszak 8	(12–16)	Rosiak 6	Hala Relax, Piotrków Trybunalski; Attendance: 450; Referees: Loshak, Shnyt (UKR)
11 October 2026; 16:00	3× (suspension)	Report	2× (suspension) 1× (red card)	Hala Relax, Piotrków Trybunalski; Attendance: 450; Referees: Loshak, Shnyt (UKR)

PGE MKS El-Volt Lublin won 68–51 on aggregate.

4 October 2026; 19:00	**Gjorche Petrov-WHC AD Skopje (North Macedonia)**	**22–18**	**(Czech Republic) DHK Baník Most**	Jane Sandanski Arena, Skopje; Attendance: 323; Referees: Martinovic, Pavicevic (MNE)
4 October 2026; 19:00	Guberinić 7	(10–10)	Šustácková 4	Jane Sandanski Arena, Skopje; Attendance: 323; Referees: Martinovic, Pavicevic (MNE)
4 October 2026; 19:00	1× (suspension)	Report	4× (suspension)	Jane Sandanski Arena, Skopje; Attendance: 323; Referees: Martinovic, Pavicevic (MNE)

10 October 2026; 18:00	**DHK Baník Most (Czech Republic)**	**27–17**	**(North Macedonia) Gjorche Petrov-WHC AD Skopje**	Sportovní hala, Most; Attendance: 750; Referees: Oganezov, Raidmets (EST)
10 October 2026; 18:00	Šustácková 8	(16–9)	Guberinić, Rizoska 4	Sportovní hala, Most; Attendance: 750; Referees: Oganezov, Raidmets (EST)
10 October 2026; 18:00	1× (yellow card) 4× (suspension)	Report	5× (suspension)	Sportovní hala, Most; Attendance: 750; Referees: Oganezov, Raidmets (EST)

DHK Baník Most won 45–39 on aggregate.

10 October 2026; 18:00	**Rocasa Gran Canaria (Spain)**	**33–25**	**(Switzerland) LC Brühl Handball**	Pabellón Insular Antonio Moreno, Telde; Attendance: 300; Referees: Hummelgard, Svensson (SWE)
10 October 2026; 18:00	Poles 10	(18–15)	Altherr 6	Pabellón Insular Antonio Moreno, Telde; Attendance: 300; Referees: Hummelgard, Svensson (SWE)
10 October 2026; 18:00	4× (suspension)	Report	4× (suspension)	Pabellón Insular Antonio Moreno, Telde; Attendance: 300; Referees: Hummelgard, Svensson (SWE)

11 October 2026; 18:00	**LC Brühl Handball (Switzerland)**	**31–25**	**(Spain) Rocasa Gran Canaria**	Pabellón Insular Antonio Moreno, Telde; Attendance: 300; Referees: Hummelgard, Svensson (SWE)
11 October 2026; 18:00	Altherr, Kernatsch 8	(15–16)	Poles, Rodriguez 8	Pabellón Insular Antonio Moreno, Telde; Attendance: 300; Referees: Hummelgard, Svensson (SWE)
11 October 2026; 18:00	6× (suspension)	Report	4× (suspension)	Pabellón Insular Antonio Moreno, Telde; Attendance: 300; Referees: Hummelgard, Svensson (SWE)

Rocasa Gran Canaria won 58–56 on aggregate.

== Round 3 ==
=== Draw ===
The draw for the qualification round was conducted on 14 October 2026 in Vienna, Austria. The bold text indicate which teams advanced.

Seeding to be confirmed
Team	Rank	Points
(Romania) HC Dunărea Brăila	19	142
(Germany) HSG Bensheim/Auerbach	27	111
(Croatia) RK Lokomotiva Zagreb	28	100
(Spain) CBF Málaga Costa del Sol	29	95
(Poland) KGHM MKS Zagłębie Lubin	30	92
(Spain) Super Amara Bera Bera	32	85
(Czech Republic) Házená Kynžvart	34	83
(Hungary) MOL Esztergom	35	82

16 winners from the second qualifying round

=== Summary ===
There are 24 teams participating in round 3. The first legs will be played on 7–8 November and the second legs will be played on 14–15 November 2026.

Team 1	Agg.	Team 2	1st leg	2nd leg
KGHM MKS Zagłębie Lubin (Poland)	–	(Norway) Tertnes Bergen	29–30	
St Amand HB-Porte du Hainaut (France)	–	(Norway) Larvik HK	25–25	
SL Benfica (Portugal)	–	(Czech Republic) Házená Kynžvart		
ŽRK Naisa Niš (Serbia)	–	(Denmark) Viborg HK		
Rocasa Gran Canaria (Spain)	–	(Spain) Super Amara Bera Bera	27–30	
Molde Elite (Norway)	–	(Romania) HC Dunărea Brăila	30–29	
Vfl Oldenburg (Germany)	–	(Spain) CBF Málaga Costa del Sol	30–28	
SCM Râmnicu Vâlcea (Romania)	–	(Poland) PGE MKS El-Volt Lublin	32–27	
Chambray Touraine Handball (France)	–	(Romania) CS Corona Brașov	25–26	
RK Lokomotiva Zagreb (Croatia)	–	(Sweden) Boden Handboll IF	33–25	
MOL Esztergom (Hungary)	–	(Czech Republic) DHK Baník Most	33–19	
HSG Bensheim/Auerbach (Germany)	–	(Sweden) IK Sävehof	26–33	

==== Matches ====
8 November 2026; 16:00	**KGHM MKS Zagłębie Lubin (Poland)**	**29–30**	**(Norway) Tertnes Bergen**	Hala RCS, Lubin; Attendance: 2,911; Referees: Cazan, Suliman (ROU)
8 November 2026; 16:00	Fernándes 9	(17–15)	Kruse 6	Hala RCS, Lubin; Attendance: 2,911; Referees: Cazan, Suliman (ROU)
8 November 2026; 16:00	2× (suspension)	Report	1× (yellow card) 2× (suspension)	Hala RCS, Lubin; Attendance: 2,911; Referees: Cazan, Suliman (ROU)

15 November 2026; 17:00	**Tertnes Bergen (Norway)**	**27–27**	**(Poland) KGHM MKS Zagłębie Lubin**	Åsane Arena, Bergen; Attendance: 684; Referees: Persis, Radcenko (LAT)
15 November 2026; 17:00	Kruse, Rosenberg 6	(16–12)	Fernández 6	Åsane Arena, Bergen; Attendance: 684; Referees: Persis, Radcenko (LAT)
15 November 2026; 17:00	1× (suspension)	Report	1× (suspension)	Åsane Arena, Bergen; Attendance: 684; Referees: Persis, Radcenko (LAT)

Tertnes Bergen won 57–56 on aggregate.

7 November 2026; 19:30	**St Amand HB-Porte du Hainaut (France)**	**25–25**	**(Norway) Larvik HK**	Salle Maurice Hugot, Saint-Amand-les-Eaux; Attendance: 957; Referees: Grapsas, Marian (GRE)
7 November 2026; 19:30	Abdellahi, Koestner 5	(14–15)	Sæteren 8	Salle Maurice Hugot, Saint-Amand-les-Eaux; Attendance: 957; Referees: Grapsas, Marian (GRE)
7 November 2026; 19:30	1× (yellow card) 3× (suspension)	Report	1× (suspension)	Salle Maurice Hugot, Saint-Amand-les-Eaux; Attendance: 957; Referees: Grapsas, Marian (GRE)

15 November 2026; 17:00	**Larvik HK (Norway)**	**31–24**	**(France) St Amand HB-Porte du Hainaut**	Jotron Arena Larvik, Larvik; Attendance: 2,412; Referees: Berdic, Sorak (SRB)
15 November 2026; 17:00	Berg 9	(17–16)	Mbata 5	Jotron Arena Larvik, Larvik; Attendance: 2,412; Referees: Berdic, Sorak (SRB)
15 November 2026; 17:00	3× (suspension)	Report	7× (suspension)	Jotron Arena Larvik, Larvik; Attendance: 2,412; Referees: Berdic, Sorak (SRB)

Larvik HK won 56–49 on aggregate.

13 November 2026; 19:30	**SL Benfica (Portugal)**	–	**(Czech Republic) Házená Kynžvart**	Pavilhão da Luz Nᵒ 2, Lisbon; Referees: Jahja, Xhema (KOS)
13 November 2026; 19:30		(–)		Pavilhão da Luz Nᵒ 2, Lisbon; Referees: Jahja, Xhema (KOS)
13 November 2026; 19:30		Report		Pavilhão da Luz Nᵒ 2, Lisbon; Referees: Jahja, Xhema (KOS)

15 November 2026; 15:00	**Házená Kynžvart (Czech Republic)**	–	**(Portugal) SL Benfica**	Pavilhão da Luz Nᵒ 2, Lisbon; Referees: Jahja, Xhema (KOS)
15 November 2026; 15:00		(–)		Pavilhão da Luz Nᵒ 2, Lisbon; Referees: Jahja, Xhema (KOS)
15 November 2026; 15:00		Report		Pavilhão da Luz Nᵒ 2, Lisbon; Referees: Jahja, Xhema (KOS)

won – on aggregate.

13 November 2026; 19:00	**ŽRK Naisa Niš (Serbia)**	–	**(Denmark) Viborg HK**	BioCirc Arena, Viborg; Referees: Härgin, Makejev (EST)
13 November 2026; 19:00		(–)		BioCirc Arena, Viborg; Referees: Härgin, Makejev (EST)
13 November 2026; 19:00		Report		BioCirc Arena, Viborg; Referees: Härgin, Makejev (EST)

15 November 2026; 16:00	**Viborg HK (Denmark)**	–	**(Serbia) ŽRK Naisa Niš**	BioCirc Arena, Viborg; Referees: Härgin, Makejev (EST)
15 November 2026; 16:00		(–)		BioCirc Arena, Viborg; Referees: Härgin, Makejev (EST)
15 November 2026; 16:00		Report		BioCirc Arena, Viborg; Referees: Härgin, Makejev (EST)

won – on aggregate.

7 November 2026; 18:30	**Rocasa Gran Canaria (Spain)**	**27–30**	**(Spain) Super Amara Bera Bera**	Pabellón Insular Antonio Moreno, Telde; Attendance: 425; Referees: Fahner, Kubis (POL)
7 November 2026; 18:30	Poles, Tort 5	(15–15)	Arroyo 9	Pabellón Insular Antonio Moreno, Telde; Attendance: 425; Referees: Fahner, Kubis (POL)
7 November 2026; 18:30	2× (yellow card) 2× (suspension)	Report	1× (yellow card) 6× (suspension)	Pabellón Insular Antonio Moreno, Telde; Attendance: 425; Referees: Fahner, Kubis (POL)

15 November 2026; 18:00	**Super Amara Bera Bera (Spain)**	–	**(Spain) Rocasa Gran Canaria**	Polideportivo Municipal José Antonio Gasca, San Sebastián; Referees: Jakovljevic, Kovacevic (SRB)
15 November 2026; 18:00		(–)		Polideportivo Municipal José Antonio Gasca, San Sebastián; Referees: Jakovljevic, Kovacevic (SRB)
15 November 2026; 18:00		Report		Polideportivo Municipal José Antonio Gasca, San Sebastián; Referees: Jakovljevic, Kovacevic (SRB)

won – on aggregate.

7 November 2026; 18:00	**Molde Elite (Norway)**	**30–29**	**(Romania) HC Dunărea Brăila**	Molde Arena, Molde; Attendance: 616; Referees: P. Geraets, R. Geraets (NED)
7 November 2026; 18:00	Tveiten 8	(16–14)	Kirdiasheva 6	Molde Arena, Molde; Attendance: 616; Referees: P. Geraets, R. Geraets (NED)
7 November 2026; 18:00	1× (yellow card) 3× (suspension)	Report	3× (suspension)	Molde Arena, Molde; Attendance: 616; Referees: P. Geraets, R. Geraets (NED)

15 November 2026; 17:30	**HC Dunărea Brăila (Romania)**	–	**(Norway) Molde Elite**	Sala Polivalentă Danubius, Brăila; Referees: Duplii, Karpushchenko (UKR)
15 November 2026; 17:30		(–)		Sala Polivalentă Danubius, Brăila; Referees: Duplii, Karpushchenko (UKR)
15 November 2026; 17:30		Report		Sala Polivalentă Danubius, Brăila; Referees: Duplii, Karpushchenko (UKR)

won – on aggregate.

7 November 2026; 16:30	**VfL Oldenburg (Germany)**	**30–28**	**(Spain) CBF Málaga Costa del Sol**	Sporthalle Wechloy, Oldenburg; Attendance: 432; Referees: Ivanovic, Kaludjerovic (MNE)
7 November 2026; 16:30	Reinemann 9	(15–12)	Sancha 8	Sporthalle Wechloy, Oldenburg; Attendance: 432; Referees: Ivanovic, Kaludjerovic (MNE)
7 November 2026; 16:30	3× (suspension) 2× (red card)	Report	2× (yellow card) 3× (suspension) 1× (red card)	Sporthalle Wechloy, Oldenburg; Attendance: 432; Referees: Ivanovic, Kaludjerovic (MNE)

14 November 2026; 19:00	**CBF Málaga Costa del Sol (Spain)**	–	**(Germany) VfL Oldenburg**	Pabellón José Luís Pérez Canca, Málaga; Referees: Panetta, Riello (ITA)
14 November 2026; 19:00		(–)		Pabellón José Luís Pérez Canca, Málaga; Referees: Panetta, Riello (ITA)
14 November 2026; 19:00		Report		Pabellón José Luís Pérez Canca, Málaga; Referees: Panetta, Riello (ITA)

won – on aggregate.

7 November 2026; 15:00	**SCM Râmnicu Vâlcea (Romania)**	**32–27**	**(Poland) PGE MKS El-Volt Lublin**	Traian Sports Hall, Râmnicu Vâlcea; Attendance: 1,534; Referees: Laron, Lindenbaum (ISR)
7 November 2026; 15:00	Sprengers, Zaadi 6	(17–16)	Rosiak 6	Traian Sports Hall, Râmnicu Vâlcea; Attendance: 1,534; Referees: Laron, Lindenbaum (ISR)
7 November 2026; 15:00	2× (yellow card) 1× (suspension)	Report	3× (suspension)	Traian Sports Hall, Râmnicu Vâlcea; Attendance: 1,534; Referees: Laron, Lindenbaum (ISR)

14 November 2026; 18:00	**PGE MKS El-Volt Lublin (Poland)**	–	**(Romania) SCM Râmnicu Vâlcea**	Globus Hall, Lublin; Referees: Brodic, Hodzic (CRO)
14 November 2026; 18:00		(–)		Globus Hall, Lublin; Referees: Brodic, Hodzic (CRO)
14 November 2026; 18:00		Report		Globus Hall, Lublin; Referees: Brodic, Hodzic (CRO)

won – on aggregate.

8 November 2026; 18:00	**Chambray Touraine Handball (France)**	**25–26**	**(Romania) CS Corona Brașov**	Gymnase de la Fontaine Blanche, Chambray-lès-Tours; Attendance: 800; Referees: Nygaard, Primdahl (DEN)
8 November 2026; 18:00	Amelot, Kanouté 7	(11–16)	Balsam, Popa 6	Gymnase de la Fontaine Blanche, Chambray-lès-Tours; Attendance: 800; Referees: Nygaard, Primdahl (DEN)
8 November 2026; 18:00		Report	1× (yellow card) 3× (suspension)	Gymnase de la Fontaine Blanche, Chambray-lès-Tours; Attendance: 800; Referees: Nygaard, Primdahl (DEN)

15 November 2026; 19:00	**CS Corona Brașov (Romania)**	–	**(France) Chambray Touraine Handball**	Sala Sporturilor Dumitru Popescu Colibași, Brașov; Referees: Cindric, Gonzurek (CRO)
15 November 2026; 19:00		(–)		Sala Sporturilor Dumitru Popescu Colibași, Brașov; Referees: Cindric, Gonzurek (CRO)
15 November 2026; 19:00		Report		Sala Sporturilor Dumitru Popescu Colibași, Brașov; Referees: Cindric, Gonzurek (CRO)

won – on aggregate.

7 November 2026; 17:00	**RK Lokomotiva Zagreb (Croatia)**	**33–25**	**(Sweden) Boden Handboll IF**	High School Jelkovec, Zagreb; Attendance: 500; Referees: Doychinov, Goretsov (BUL)
7 November 2026; 17:00	Bule, Strugar 7	(18–14)	Lagdumzija, Thomsen 5	High School Jelkovec, Zagreb; Attendance: 500; Referees: Doychinov, Goretsov (BUL)
7 November 2026; 17:00	1× (yellow card) 3× (suspension)	Report	1× (yellow card) 2× (suspension)	High School Jelkovec, Zagreb; Attendance: 500; Referees: Doychinov, Goretsov (BUL)

15 November 2026; 16:00	**Boden Handboll IF (Sweden)**	–	**(Croatia) RK Lokomotiva Zagreb**	Bodens Energi Arena, Boden; Referees: Oganezov, Raidmets (EST)
15 November 2026; 16:00		(–)		Bodens Energi Arena, Boden; Referees: Oganezov, Raidmets (EST)
15 November 2026; 16:00		Report		Bodens Energi Arena, Boden; Referees: Oganezov, Raidmets (EST)

won – on aggregate.

8 November 2026; 18:00	**MOL Esztergom (Hungary)**	**33–19**	**(Czech Republic) DHK Baník Most**	Suzuki Aréna, Esztergom; Attendance: 1,080; Referees: Janz, Sug (GER)
8 November 2026; 18:00	three players 5	(14–9)	Grollier 5	Suzuki Aréna, Esztergom; Attendance: 1,080; Referees: Janz, Sug (GER)
8 November 2026; 18:00	2× (suspension)	Report	2× (suspension)	Suzuki Aréna, Esztergom; Attendance: 1,080; Referees: Janz, Sug (GER)

14 November 2026; 14:00	**DHK Baník Most (Czech Republic)**	–	**(Hungary) MOL Esztergom**	Sportovní hala, Most; Referees: Kaplinsky, Pinker (ISR)
14 November 2026; 14:00		(–)		Sportovní hala, Most; Referees: Kaplinsky, Pinker (ISR)
14 November 2026; 14:00		Report		Sportovní hala, Most; Referees: Kaplinsky, Pinker (ISR)

won – on aggregate.

8 November 2026; 16:00	**HSG Bensheim/Auerbach (Germany)**	**26–33**	**(Sweden) IK Sävehof**	Weststadthalle, Bensheim; Attendance: 548; Referees: Danilovic, Karan (BIH)
8 November 2026; 16:00	Kretzschmar 10	(12–15)	Þorkelsdóttir 9	Weststadthalle, Bensheim; Attendance: 548; Referees: Danilovic, Karan (BIH)
8 November 2026; 16:00	2× (suspension)	Report	3× (suspension)	Weststadthalle, Bensheim; Attendance: 548; Referees: Danilovic, Karan (BIH)

15 November 2026; 15:00	**IK Sävehof (Sweden)**	–	**(Germany) HSG Bensheim/Auerbach**	Partille Arena, Partille; Referees: Dasic, Husomanovic (NOR)
15 November 2026; 15:00		(–)		Partille Arena, Partille; Referees: Dasic, Husomanovic (NOR)
15 November 2026; 15:00		Report		Partille Arena, Partille; Referees: Dasic, Husomanovic (NOR)

won – on aggregate.

== See also ==
- 2026–27 EHF Champions League
- 2026–27 EHF European League
- 2026–27 EHF European Cup
- 2026–27 Women's EHF Champions League
- 2026–27 Women's EHF European League
- 2026–27 Women's EHF European Cup
