= Roszak =

Roszak is a surname. Notable people with the surname include:

- Maria Roszak (1908–2018), Polish nun
- Matthew Roszak (born 1972/1973), American billionaire venture capitalist
- Romana Roszak (born 1994), Polish handballer
- Theodore Roszak (disambiguation), several people
- Thomas Roszak (born 1966), American architect
