= 2026–27 Women's EHF European League =

European handball tournament

Women's EHF European League
- 2026–27

Tournament information
- Sport: Handball
- Location: Europe
- Dates: 5 September 2026–9 May 2027
- Administrator: European Handball Federation
- Tournament format(s): Qualification rounds, group phase, quarter-finals and finals
- Teams: Competition proper: 16; Total: 44 (from 18 countries)
- Website: EHF European League Women

The 2026–27 Women's EHF European League will be the seventh season of the Women's EHF European League, Europe's second-tier women's club handball competition organised by the European Handball Federation (EHF).

According to the official EHF regulations, the season is scheduled to start with the first qualification round on 5–6 September 2026 and to conclude with the EHF European League Finals on 8–9 May 2027.

The competition format includes three qualification rounds, followed by a group phase with four groups of four teams. The top teams from the group phase advance to the quarter-finals, with the four quarter-final winners qualifying for the EHF European League Finals.

JDA Bourgogne Dijon HB won their first title after beating Thüringer HC in the final 29–25 at Dijon.

== Format ==
The qualification rounds are played over two legs. The group phase consists of four groups of four teams, with each team playing home and away matches against the other teams in its group. The knockout stage includes two-legged quarter-finals, followed by a final four tournament.

== Rankings ==
The rankings are based on the performances of each club from a respective country from a three-year period.

- Associations 1–2 can have four clubs qualify.
- Associations 3–9 can have three clubs qualify.
- Associations 10–18 can have two clubs qualify.
- Associations 19–29 can have one club qualify.
- Associations below the top 30 can't participate in this competition.

Rank	Association	Average points	Teams
1	Denmark	94.67	2
2	Germany	92.67	4
3	Norway	78.33	3
4	Romania	75.67	3
5	France	73.00	4
6	Hungary	47.33	3
7	Spain	34.33	4
8	Croatia	33.00	3
9	Poland	27.67	3
10	Sweden	14.67	3
11	Switzerland	14.00	3
12	Czech Republic	10.00	2
13	Serbia	9.67	2
14	Turkey	5.33	1
15	Austria	1.67	1

Rank	Association	Average points	Teams
16	North Macedonia	1.00	1
17	Portugal	1.00	1
18	Greece	0.67	2
19	Netherlands	0.33	0
19	Slovakia	0.33	0
21	Iceland	0.33	0
22	Azerbaijan	0.00	0
22	Cyprus	0.00	0
22	Finland	0.00	0
22	Israel	0.00	0
22	Italy	0.00	0
22	Kosovo	0.00	0
22	Luxembourg	0.00	0
22	Ukraine	0.00	0
30	(N/A) Everyone else	0.00	0

== Qualified teams ==
The labels in the parentheses show how each team qualified for the place of its starting round:

- EL: European League title holders
- EC: European Cup title holders
- CW: Cup winners
- CR: Cup runners-up
- 4th, 5th, etc.: League position of the previous season

The official publication of the participating teams was done on 6 July 2026.

=== Team allocation ===
Group stage
(France) JDA Bourgogne Dijon ^{EL} (5th)	(Denmark) Ikast Håndbold (4th)	(Germany) Thüringer HC (3rd)	(Hungary) DVSC Skyline (3rd)
Round 3
(Germany) HSG Bensheim/Auerbach (4th)	(Romania) HC Dunărea Brăila (5th)	(Hungary) MOL Esztergom (4th)	(Spain) Super Amara Bera Bera (CW, 2nd)
(Spain) CBF Málaga Costa del Sol (3rd)	(Croatia) RK Lokomotiva Zagreb (2nd)	(Poland) KGHM MKS Zagłębie Lubin (1st)	(Czech Republic) Házená Kynžvart (2nd)
Round 2
(Denmark) Viborg HK (5th)	(Germany) Vfl Oldenburg (5th)	(Germany) TuS Metzingen (6th)	(Norway) Molde Elite (3rd)
(Norway) Larvik HK (4th)	(Norway) Tertnes Bergen (5th)	(Romania) CS Corona Brașov (3rd)	(Romania) SCM Râmnicu Vâlcea (4th)
(France) Chambray Touraine Handball (3rd)	(France) St Amand HB-Porte du Hainaut (4th)	(France) OGC Nice Côte d'Azur Handball (6th)	(Hungary) Vác (5th)
(Spain) Rocasa Gran Canaria (1st)	(Spain) CB Atlético Guardés ^{EC} (4th)	(Croatia) ŽRK Zrinski Čakovec (3rd)	(Croatia) ŽRK Bjelovar (4th)
(Poland) PGE MKS El-Volt Lublin (2nd)	(Poland) KRASON MKS Piotrcovia PT (3rd)	(Sweden) IK Sävehof (1st)	(Sweden) Skara HF (2nd)
(Sweden) Boden Handboll IF (5th)	(Switzerland) GC Amicitia Zürich (1st)	(Switzerland) LC Brühl Handball (2nd)	(Czech Republic) DHK Baník Most (3rd)
(Serbia) ŽRK Crvena zvezda (1st)	(Serbia) ŽRK Naisa Niš (2nd)	(Turkey) Bursa Büyükşehir BSK (1st)	(Austria) Hypo Niederösterreich (1st)
(North Macedonia) HC Gjorche Petrov-WHC AD Skopje (1st)	(Portugal) SL Benfica (1st)	(Greece) AC PAOK (1st)	(Greece) AEK Athens (2nd)

== Round and draw dates ==
The schedule of the competition was as follows (all draws were held at the EHF headquarters in Vienna, Austria).

Phase	Round	Draw date	First leg	Second leg
Qualification	Second qualifying round	14 July 2026	3–4 October 2026	10–11 October 2026
Qualification	Third qualifying round	13 October 2026	7–8 November 2026	14–15 November 2026
Group stage	Matchday 1	11 November 2026	9–10 January 2027	
Group stage	Matchday 2	11 November 2026	16–17 January 2027	
Group stage	Matchday 3	11 November 2026	23–24 January 2027	
Group stage	Matchday 4	11 November 2026	6–7 February 2027	
Group stage	Matchday 5	11 November 2026	13–14 February 2027	
Group stage	Matchday 6	11 November 2026	20–21 February 2027	
Knockout phase	Quarter-finals	no draw	20–21 March 2027	27–28 March 2027
Knockout phase	Semi finals	TBD	8 May 2027	
Knockout phase	Final	no draw	9 May 2027	

== Qualification round ==
=== Round 2 ===
There were 32 teams participating in round 2. The first legs were played on 3–4 October 2026 and the second legs were played on 10–11 October 2026.

Team 1	Agg.	Team 2	1st leg	2nd leg
Boden Handboll IF (Sweden)	61–54	(Spain) CB Atlético Guardés	30–28	31–26
SCM Râmnicu Vâlcea (Romania)	68–52	(Germany) TuS Metzingen	39–24	29–28
SL Benfica (Portugal)	72–37	(Croatia) ŽRK Zrinski Čakovec	31–16	41–21
Viborg HK (Denmark)	72–41	(Greece) AEK Athens	42–24	30–17
Hypo Niederösterreich (Austria)	51–69	(Sweden) IK Sävehof	27–31	24–38
ŽRK Naisa Niš (Serbia)	61–56	(Turkey) Bursa Büyükşehir BSK	29–28	32–28
Molde Elite (Norway)	56–45	(Greece) AC PAOK	27–24	29–21
ŽRK Bjelovar (Croatia)	38–72	(France) Chambray Touraine Handball	25–37	13–35
St Amand HB-Porte du Hainaut (France)	59–56	(Hungary) Vác	32–30	27–26
OGC Nice Côte d'Azur Handball (France)	60–61	(Norway) Larvik HK	28–27	32–34
Skara HF (Sweden)	53–62	(Norway) Tertnes Bergen	25–29	28–33
CS Corona Brașov (Romania)	58–53	(Serbia) ŽRK Crvena zvezda	32–25	26–28
GC Amicitia Zürich (Switzerland)	45–54	(Germany) Vfl Oldenburg	22–31	23–23
PGE MKS El-Volt Lublin (Poland)	68–51	(Poland) KRASON MKS Piotrcovia PT	36–24	32–27
Gjorche Petrov-WHC AD Skopje (North Macedonia)	39–45	(Czech Republic) DHK Baník Most	22–18	17–27
Rocasa Gran Canaria (Spain)	58–56	(Switzerland) LC Brühl Handball	33–25	25–31

=== Round 3 ===
There were 24 teams participating in round 3. The first legs were played on 7–8 November and the second legs were played on 14–15 November 2026.

Team 1	Agg.	Team 2	1st leg	2nd leg
KGHM MKS Zagłębie Lubin (Poland)	–	(Norway) Tertnes Bergen		
St Amand HB-Porte du Hainaut (France)	–	(Norway) Larvik HK		
SL Benfica (Portugal)	–	(Czech Republic) Házená Kynžvart		
ŽRK Naisa Niš (Serbia)	–	(Denmark) Viborg HK		
Rocasa Gran Canaria (Spain)	–	(Spain) Super Amara Bera Bera		
Molde Elite (Norway)	–	(Romania) HC Dunărea Brăila		
Vfl Oldenburg (Germany)	–	(Spain) CBF Málaga Costa del Sol		
SCM Râmnicu Vâlcea (Romania)	–	(Poland) PGE MKS El-Volt Lublin		
Chambray Touraine Handball (France)	–	(Romania) CS Corona Brașov		
RK Lokomotiva Zagreb (Croatia)	–	(Sweden) Boden Handboll IF		
MOL Esztergom (Hungary)	–	(Czech Republic) DHK Baník Most		
HSG Bensheim/Auerbach (Germany)	–	(Sweden) IK Sävehof		
