= Taja =

Taja may refer to:

- Taja, Teverga, a parish in Asturias, Spain
- Khaled Taja (1939–2012), Syrian actor
- Taja Bodlaj (born 2006), Slovenian ski jumper
- Taja Čajko (born 1993), Slovenian handball player
- Taja Kramberger (born 1970), Slovenian writer and historian
- Taja Mohorčič (born 1989), Slovenian tennis player
- Taja Sevelle (born Nancy Richardson in 1962), American singer
- a character in the television series Mortal Kombat: Conquest

== See also ==
- Tajae (given name)
