= Pišek =

Pišek is a surname. Notable people with the surname include:

- Janez Pišek, multiple people
- Jasmina Pišek (born 1996), Slovenian handball player
