= Kinga Grzyb =

Polish handball player (born 1982)

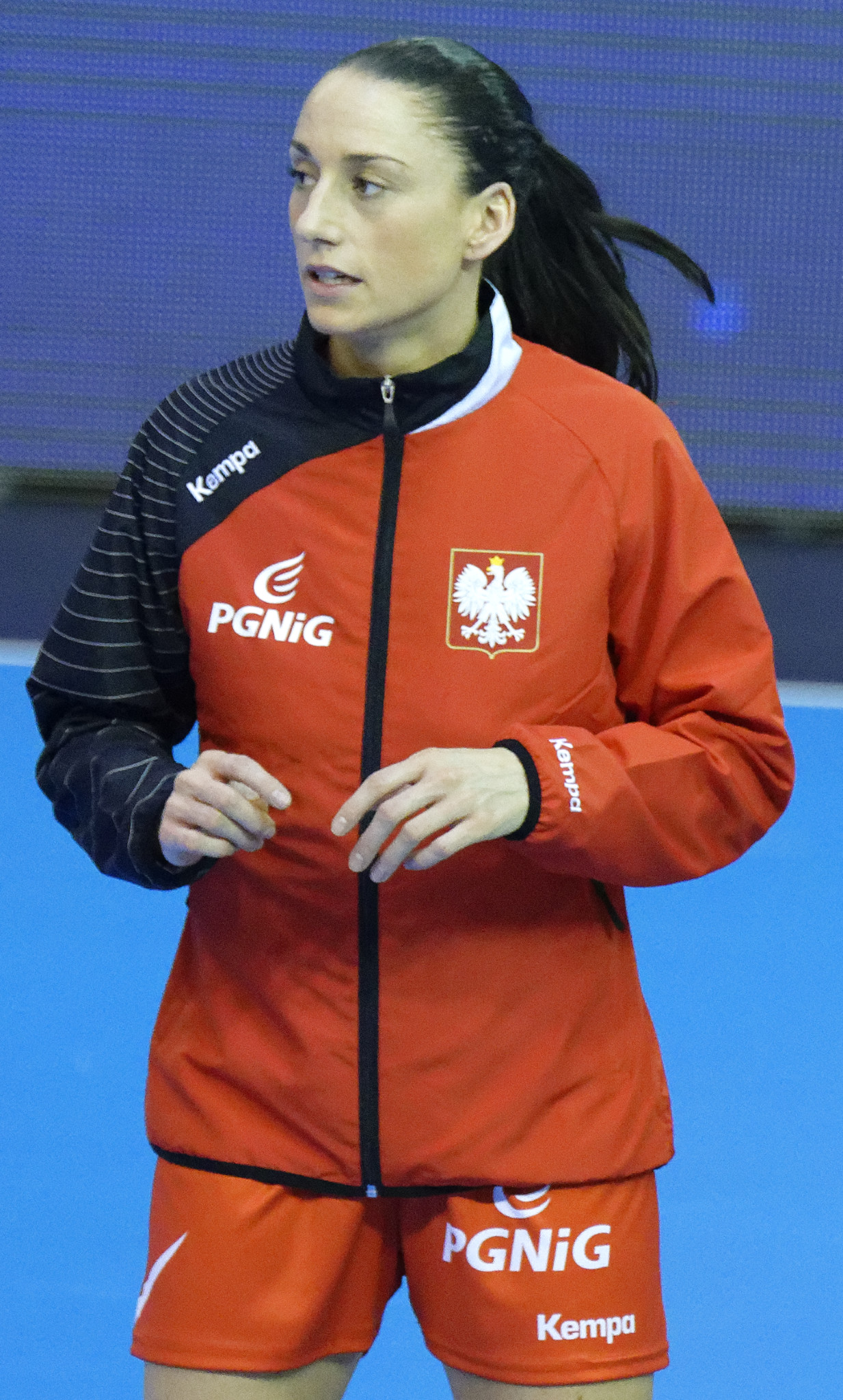

Personal information
- Nationality: Polish
- Born: 12 January 1982 (age 44) Elbląg, Poland
- Height: 1.68 m (5 ft 6 in)

Sport
- Sport: Handball
- Position: Left wing
- Current club: Zagłębie Lubin
- Number: 6

Senior clubs
- Years: Team
- 2001–2005: Start Elbląg
- 2005–2011: Piotrcovia Piotrków Trybunalski
- 2011–2013: Ruch Chorzów
- 2013–2015: Start Elbląg
- 2015–: Zagłębie Lubin
National team
Years	Team	Apps	(Gls)
2001–2020	Poland	266	(728)

Kinga Grzyb, née Polenz (born 12 January 1982) is a Polish handball player for Zagłębie Lubin.

She represented Poland at the 2013 World Women's Handball Championship in Serbia.

== International honours ==
- Carpathian Trophy:
  - Winner: 2017
