= Krowicki =

Krowicki (feminine: Krowicka; plural: Krowiccy) is a Polish surname. Notable people with the surname include:

- Leszek Krowicki (born 1957), Polish handball coach
- Marcin Krowicki (1500–1573), Polish theologian
