= Eleonora Kodele =

Slovenian handball player

Personal information
- Nationality: Slovenian
- Born: 16 October 1998 (age 28) Ljubljana, Slovenia
- Height: 1.70 m (5 ft 7 in)

Sport
- Sport: Handball
- Position: Left back
- Current club: ŽRK Celje
- Number: 70

Senior clubs
- Years: Team
- –: ŽRK Celje
National team
- Years: Team
- –: Slovenia
Medal record
Mediterranean Games
| Bronze medal – third place | 2018 Tarragona | Team |

Eleonora Kodele (born 16 October 1998) is a Slovenian handball player who plays for ŽRK Celje and the Slovenia national team.
