= 2017 Carpathian Trophy =

Tournament details
- Host country: Romania
- Venue(s): 1 (in 1 host city)
- Dates: 24–26 November
- Teams: 4 (from 2 confederations)

Final positions
- Champions: Poland (1st title)
- Runner-up: Romania
- Third place: Brazil
- Fourth place: North Macedonia

Tournament statistics
- Matches played: 6
- Goals scored: 299 (49.83 per match)
- Top scorer(s): (North Macedonia) Elena Gjeorgjievska

Awards
- Best player: (Romania) Cristina Neagu

The 2017 Carpathian Trophy was the 49th edition of the Carpathian Trophy held in Craiova, Romania between 24 and 26 November as a women's friendly handball tournament organised by the Romanian Handball Federation.

== Results ==
Team	Pld	W	D	L	GF	GA	GD	Pts
Poland	3	3	0	0	88	64	+24	6
Romania	3	2	0	1	76	68	+8	4
Brazil	3	1	0	2	73	72	+1	2
North Macedonia	3	0	0	3	62	95	–33	0

== Round robin ==
All times are local (UTC+02:00).

24 November 2017; 17:00	North Macedonia	19–32	Brazil	Sala Polivalentă, Craiova
24 November 2017; 17:00		(13–16)		Sala Polivalentă, Craiova

24 November 2017; 19:00	Romania	21–27	Poland	Sala Polivalentă, Craiova
24 November 2017; 19:00	Neagu 9	(10–18)	Grzyb 5	Sala Polivalentă, Craiova

25 November 2017; 14:00	Brazil	18–29	Poland	Sala Polivalentă, Craiova; Referees: Florescu, Stoia (ROU)
25 November 2017; 14:00	Amorim, da Silva 4	(9–11)	Kudłacz-Gloc 7	Sala Polivalentă, Craiova; Referees: Florescu, Stoia (ROU)

25 November 2017; 16:00	Romania	31–18	North Macedonia	Sala Polivalentă, Craiova; Referees: Horváth, Marton (HUN)
25 November 2017; 16:00	Florianu 5	(18–5)	Gjeorgjievska, Ristovska 5	Sala Polivalentă, Craiova; Referees: Horváth, Marton (HUN)

26 November 2017; 14:00	North Macedonia	25–32	Poland	Sala Polivalentă, Craiova; Referees: Năstase, Stancu (ROU)
26 November 2017; 14:00		(15–19)		Sala Polivalentă, Craiova; Referees: Năstase, Stancu (ROU)

26 November 2017; 16:00	Romania	24–23	Brazil	Sala Polivalentă, Craiova; Attendance: 4,000; Referees: Horváth, Marton (HUN)
26 November 2017; 16:00	Neagu 8	(13–15)	Rodrigues-Belo 7	Sala Polivalentă, Craiova; Attendance: 4,000; Referees: Horváth, Marton (HUN)

== Statistics ==
2017 Carpathian Trophy Champions

Poland
First title

Team roster: Adrianna Płaczek, Weronika Gawlik, Adrianna Górna, Katarzyna Janiszewska, Monika Kobylińska, Aleksandra Zych, Ewa Urtnowska, Joanna Drabik, Joanna Szarawaga, Kinga Grzyb, Daria Zawistowska, Monika Michałów, Karolina Kudłacz-Gloc, Sylwia Lisewska, Kinga Achruk, Romana Roszak, Joanna Kozłowska.
Head coach: Leszek Krowicki.

=== Final standing ===
Rank	Team
Gold medal	Poland
2	Romania
3	Brazil
4	North Macedonia

=== Awards ===
- Top Scorer: Elena Gjeorgjievska (MKD)
- Most Valuable Player: Cristina Neagu (ROU)
- Best Goalkeeper: Adrianna Płaczek (POL)
