= Weronika Gawlik =

Polish handball player (born 1986)

Personal information
- Nationality: Polish
- Born: 20 October 1986 (age 40) Gliwice, Poland
- Height: 1.80 m (5 ft 11 in)

Sport
- Sport: Handball
- Position: Goalkeeper
- Current club: MKS Lublin
- Number: 12

Senior clubs
- Years: Team
- -2008: Sośnica Gliwice
- 2008-2011: Zgoda Ruda Śląska
- 2011-: MKS Lublin
National team
Years	Team	Apps	(Gls)
–	Poland	105	(5)
- Updated on 22 October 2023

Weronika Gawlik (born 20 October 1986) is a Polish handball player for MKS Lublin and the Polish national team.

She competed at the 2015 World Women's Handball Championship in Denmark.

== International honours ==
- Carpathian Trophy:
  - Winner: 2017
