= Romana Roszak =

Polish handball player (born 1994)

Personal information
- Nationality: Polish
- Born: 1 October 1994 (age 32) Gostyń, Poland
- Height: 1.75 m (5 ft 9 in)

Sport
- Sport: Handball
- Position: Centre back
- Current club: Piotrcovia Piotrków Trybunalski
- Number: 8

Senior clubs
- Years: Team
- 2015–2019: AZS Politechnika Koszalin
- 2019–: Piotrcovia Piotrków Trybunalski
National team
Years	Team	Apps	(Gls)
–	Poland	33	(59)

Romana Roszak (born 1 October 1994) is a Polish female handballer for Piotrcovia Piotrków Trybunalski and the Polish national team.

== International honours ==
- Carpathian Trophy:
  - Winner: 2017
