= Karolina Kudłacz-Gloc =

Polish handball player (born 1985)

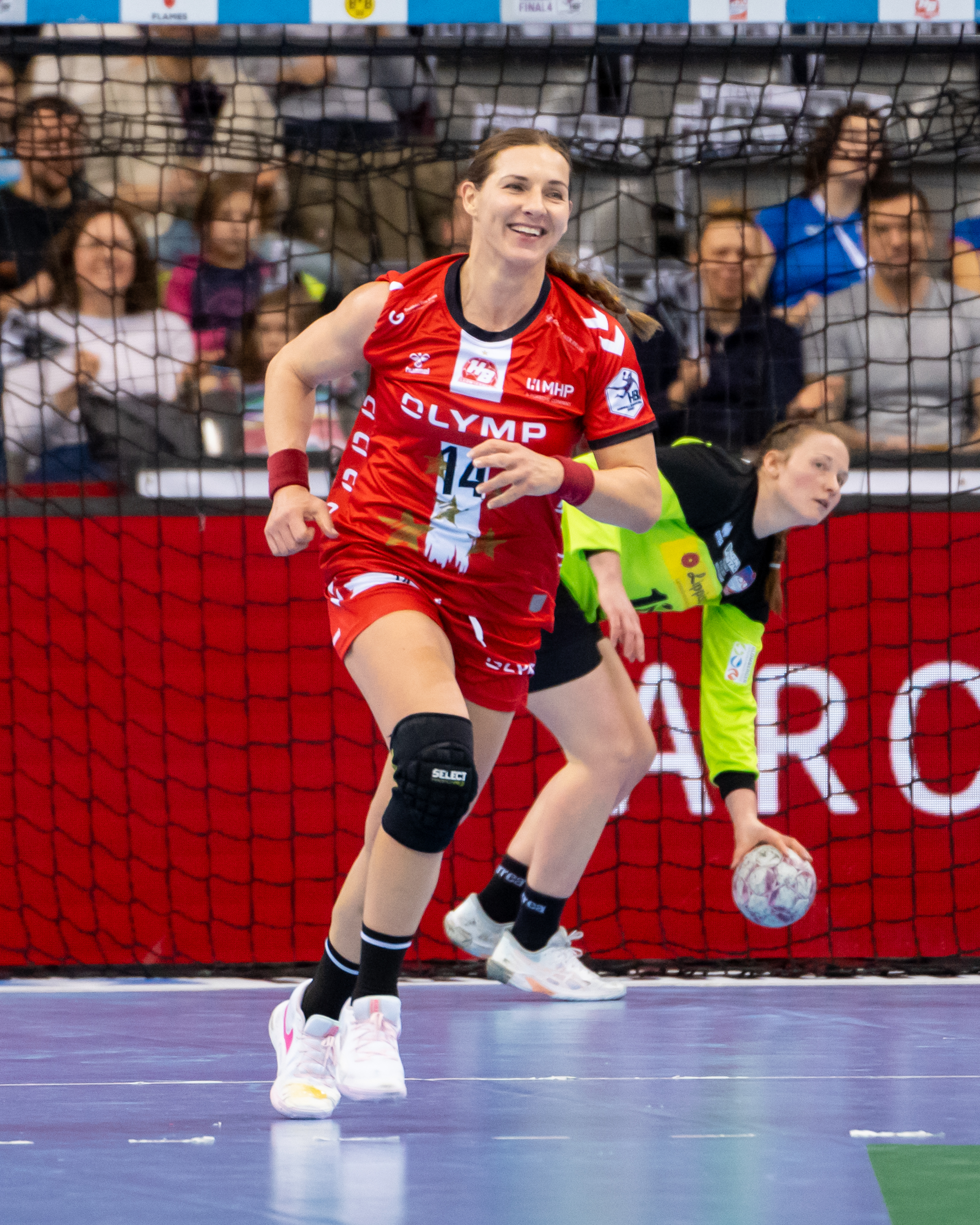

Personal information
- Nationality: Polish
- Born: 17 January 1985 (age 41) Wąbrzeźno, Poland
- Height: 1.78 m (5 ft 10 in)

Sport
- Sport: Handball
- Position: Left back

Senior clubs
- Years: Team
- 1995–1999: Vambresia Wąbrzeźno
- 1999–2001: Słupia Słupsk
- 2001–2006: AZS-AWFiS Gdańsk
- 2006–2017: HC Leipzig
- 2017–2024: SG BBM Bietigheim
- 2024–2025: HB Ludwigsburg
National team
Years	Team	Apps	(Gls)
2004–2021	Poland	197	(983)

Karolina Kudłacz-Gloc (born 17 January 1985) is a former Polish handball player and captain of the Polish national team. With 983 goals, she holds the goalscoring record on the Polish national team.

== Achievements ==
- EHF European League:
  - Winner: 2022
- Bundesliga:
  - Winner: 2019, 2022, 2023

== International honours ==
- Carpathian Trophy:
  - Winner: 2017

== International career ==
Kudlacz played also for the Polish national team. She was second on the top scoring list at the 2006 European Women's Handball Championship, where the Polish team finished 8th. Kudlacz also participated at the 2005 World Women's Handball Championship.

=== Junior success ===
Karolina Kudłacz had great success at the European women's 19 handball championship in 2004, where she was Top Scorer with 76 goals; she was awarded the Best player of the championship, and best Left Back on the ALL Star Team.
