= Ewa Urtnowska =

Polish handball player (born 1992)

Personal information
- Nationality: Polish
- Born: 18 January 1992 (age 34) Gdańsk, Poland
- Height: 1.85 m (6 ft 1 in)

Sport
- Sport: Handball
- Position: Right back
- Current club: MKS Lublin
- Number: 92
National team
Years	Team	Apps	(Gls)
–	Poland	71	(36)

Ewa Urtnowska née Andrzejewska (born 18 January 1992) is a Polish handball player for MKS Lublin and the Polish national team.

She participated at the 2016 European Women's Handball Championship.

== International honours ==
- Carpathian Trophy:
  - Winner: 2017
