= Adrianna Płaczek =

Polish handball player (born 1993)

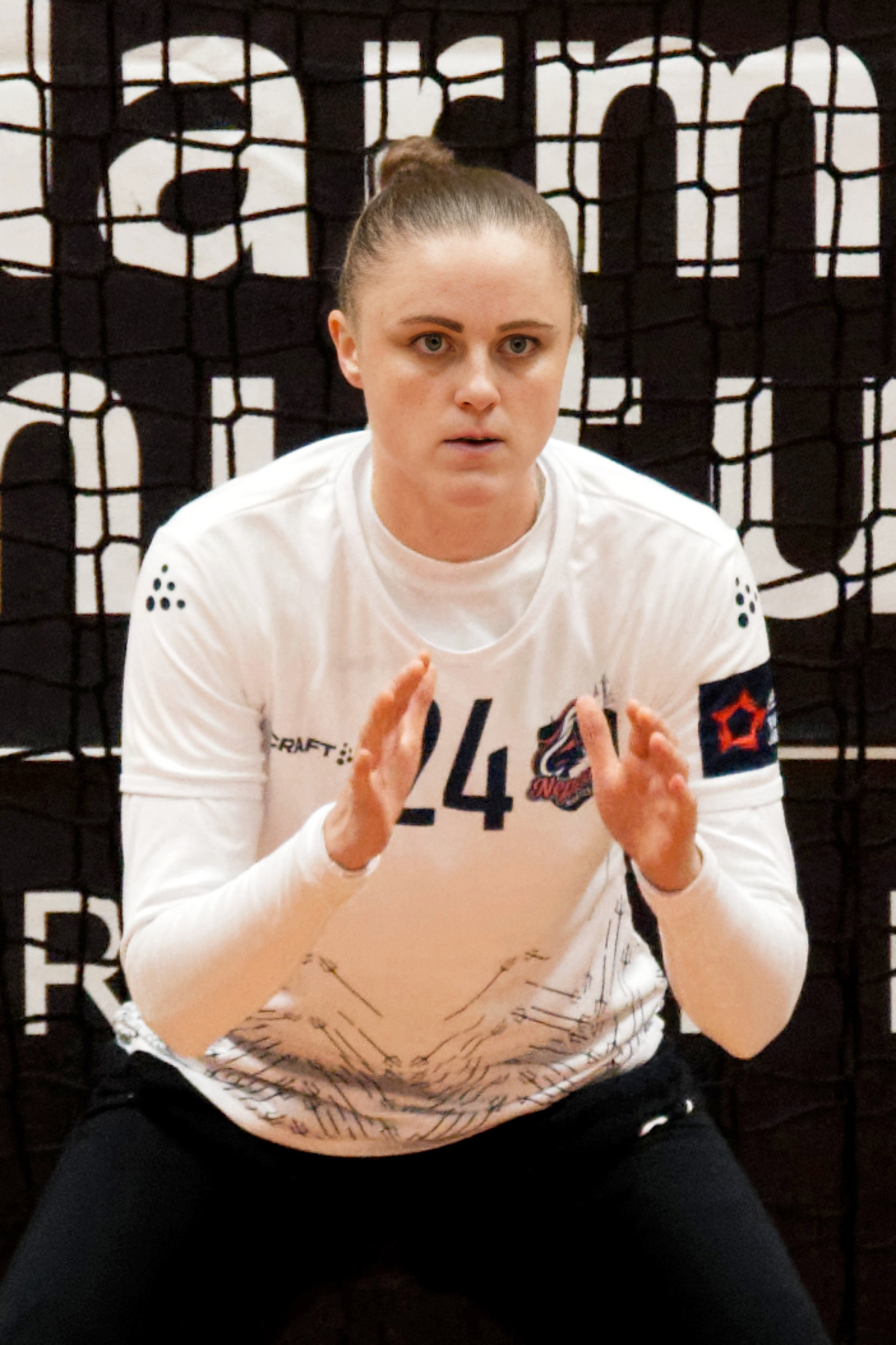
- Adrianna Płaczek (2021)

Personal information
- Nationality: Polish
- Born: 10 December 1993 (age 32) Leszno, Poland
- Height: 1.74 m (5 ft 9 in)

Sport
- Sport: Handball
- Position: Goalkeeper
- Current club: DVSC Schaeffler

Senior clubs
- Years: Team
- 2011–2017: SPR Pogoń Szczecin
- 2017–2019: Fleury Loiret
- 2019–2023: Nantes Atlantique Handball
- 2023–2025: Paris 92
- 2025–: Debrecen
National team
Years	Team	Apps	(Gls)
–	Poland	114	(1)
- Updated on 3 November 2025

Adrianna Płaczek (born 10 December 1993) is a Polish handball player for DVSC Schaeffler and the Polish national team.

She participated at the 2016 European Women's Handball Championship.

== Achievements ==
=== Club ===
==== International ====
- EHF European League:
  - Winner (gold) : 2021 (with Nantes Atlantique Handball)
- EHF European Cup:
  - Runner up: 2015 (with SPR Pogoń Szczecin)

==== Domestic ====
- French Cup:
  - Runner up: 2021 (with Nantes Atlantique Handball)
- Polish league:
  - Runner up: 2016 (with SPR Pogoń Szczecin)
- Polish Cup (Puchar Polski):
  - Runner up: 2016 (with SPR Pogoń Szczecin)

=== National team ===
- Carpathian Trophy:
  - Winner: 2017

== Individual awards ==
- Carpathian Trophy Best Goalkeeper: 2017
