= Janez Pišek =

Janez Pišek may refer to:

- Janez Pišek (footballer, born 1911), Slovenian football player and manager
- Janez Pišek (footballer, born 1998), Slovenian football player
