= Markéta Hurychová =

Czech handball player (born 1997)

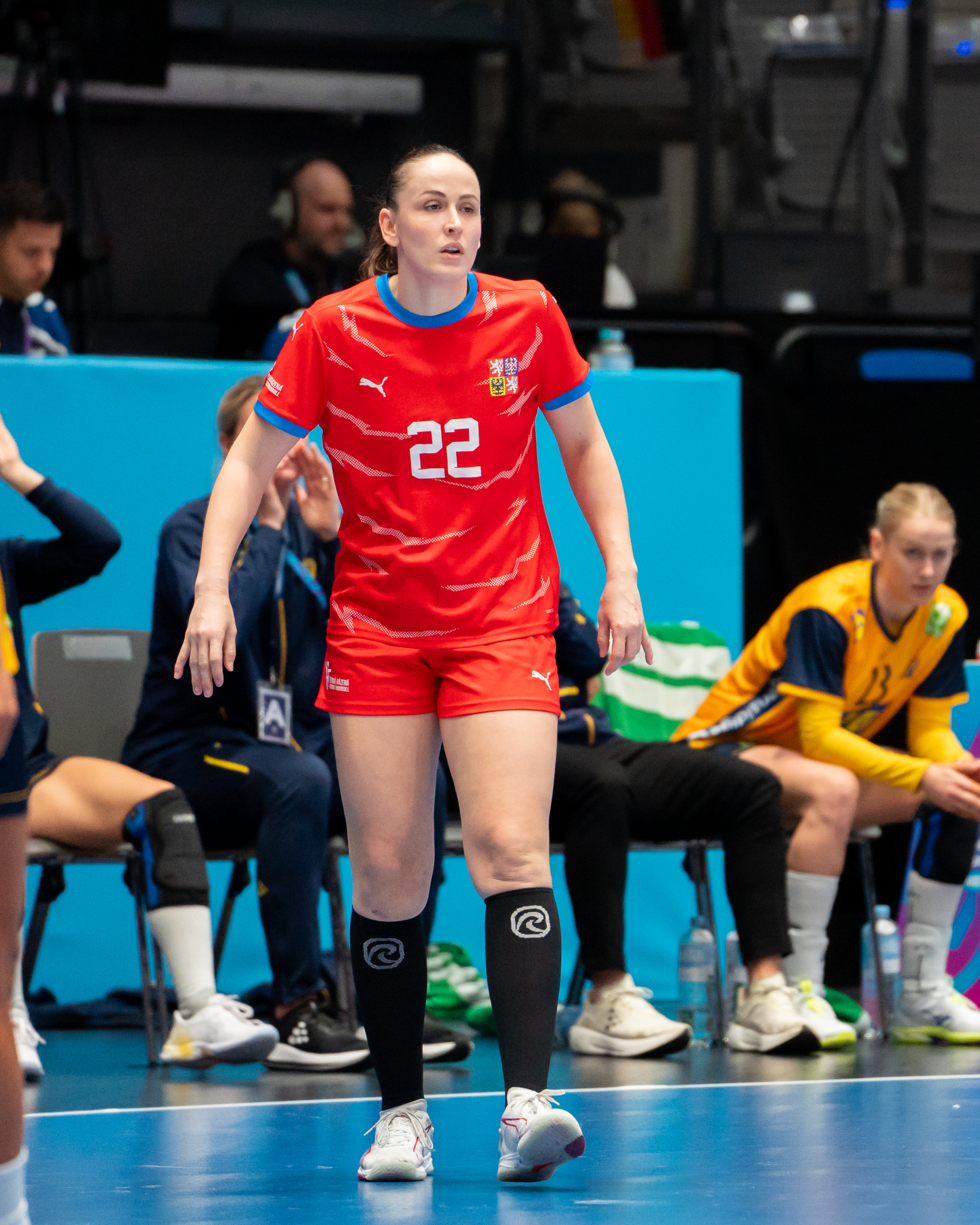
- Markéta Hurychová (2025)

Personal information
- Nationality: Czech
- Born: 9 April 1997 (age 29) Neratovice, Czech Republic
- Height: 1.74 m (5 ft 9 in)

Sport
- Sport: Handball
- Position: Right back
- Current club: Molde Elite
- Number: 22

Senior clubs
- Years: Team
- –: DHK Zora Olomouc
- –2020: Zagłębie Lubin
- 2020–2023: Saint-Amand Handball
- 2023–: Molde Elite
National team
Years	Team	Apps	(Gls)
2018–	Czech Republic	75	(122)
- Updated on 29 October 2025

Markéta Hurychová (born 9 April 1997) is a Czech female handball player for Molde Elite in Norway and the Czech national team.

She represented the Czech Republic at the 2020 European Women's Handball Championship.
