= Thomas Roszak =

American architect (born 1966)

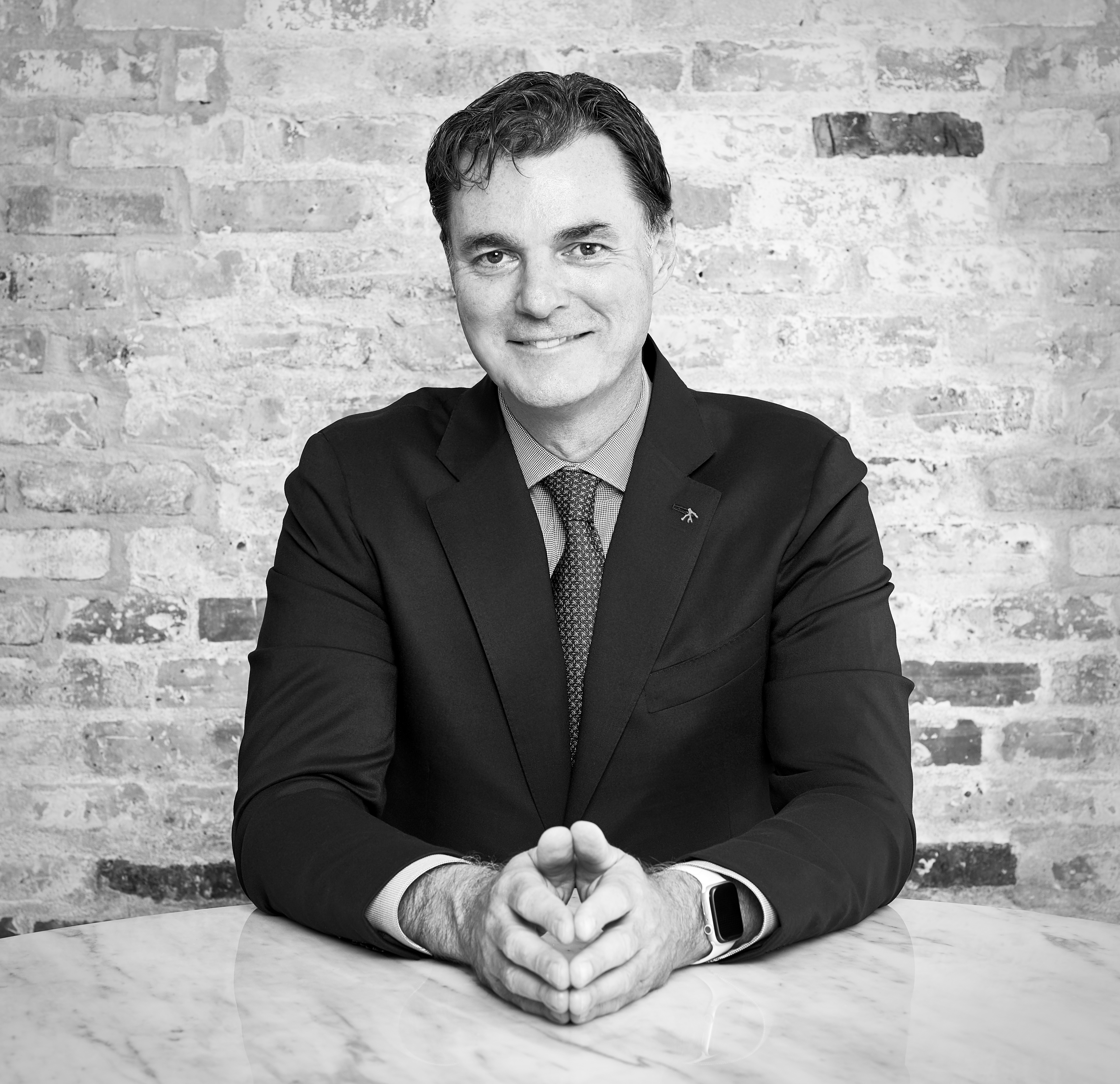
- Roszak in 2020
- Born: 1966 (age 59–60); Chicago, Illinois, U.S.
- Education: Illinois Institute of Technology (Illinois Tech)
- Occupations: Architect, developer
- Website: roszak.com

Thomas Roszak, FAIA (born 1966) is an American architect, real estate developer, business executive, author, and academic.

Roszak has developed, designed, and built commercial properties, hotels, condominiums, and private residences in Illinois and Arizona. He founded and runs three companies involved in architecture, construction, and real estate development. He was an adjunct professor in the College of Architecture, Illinois Institute of Technology (Illinois Tech). In 2008, Roszak received an award from the American Institute of Architects for a house he built for his family.

== Biography ==
Roszak received a bachelor's degree in architecture from the Illinois Institute of Technology (Illinois Tech) in 1989. In 1996, after early-career positions at architecture and development firms in Chicago, he founded Roszak Architecture, Development, and Construction, located in Evanston, Illinois.

Roszak/ADC developed and created projects representing more than $3 billion in the Chicago and Phoenix areas. His condominium developments in Chicago and Evanston have been cited for their beauty, ingenuity, and sensitivity to people and the environment.

Now Roszak leads as principal in three companies headquartered in Chicago:

- Thomas Roszak Architecture
- SteelGrass, construction management
- TR Management + Consulting, development

In the special 2005 Architectural Digest Issue, Roszak was named one of the best residential architects in the United States.

In 2020, Roszak was elevated to Fellow of the American Institute of Architects (FAIA).

Roszak served as an adjunct professor in the College of Architecture, Illinois Institute of Technology (Illinois Tech), where he taught a comprehensive architectural design and construction studio. In 2015, Illinois Tech awarded him the John J. Schommer Honor I Award in recognition of alumni who excel both in leadership and performance in their chosen professional careers. The Thomas A. Roszak Endowed Scholarship has been created to support student academic achievement at Illinois Tech College of Architecture. Thomas Roszak was elected to the Illinois Tech Board of Trustees in 2022.

His firm, Thomas Roszak Architecture, was presented with an international design award in the Swiss-based BLT Built Design Awards global competition in 2023. The Fulbrix Apartments was selected as Winner in Architectural Design in the Mixed-use Building category.

== Glass House ==
In the 2000s, Roszak designed and constructed a house of glass, concrete, and steel for his wife and three children. The Glass House received an Honor Award for interior architecture from the American Institute of Architects in 2008. The AIA jury commented:

"The transparency from the outside in and the inside out is a strong design concept. Not only does transparency unite the functional space of the floor plan with the environment, it informs the canvas about the use of color—the yellow structure, red core walls, and cherry floors tie directly to the seasonal vegetation, bringing the landscape into play as design elements."

In 2007, Glass House: A Family Home was published by Edizioni Press. The book discusses design decisions made on the house and the realities of living in a transparent home .

== Purpose + Process ==
Purpose + Process was published by Images Publishing in 2018. The book details Roszak's architect-led process, which integrates design with construction, development, financing, marketing, and management of real estate, and delineates the evolution of his modernist sensibilities and the integrated project delivery approach he has applied to his practice since 1996. Featuring sixteen of Roszak's residential, commercial, and specialty design projects, Purpose + Process contains introductory essays by architects Thomas Kerwin and Dirk Lohan further describing Roszak's approach.

== Selected projects ==
| Project | Location | Completed | Building type | Process | Notes |
|---|---|---|---|---|---|
| Arlington Heights Gateway | Arlington Heights, Illinois | 2026 | Mid-rise residential / retail | Design / develop / build | |
| Fulbrix-160 N. Elizabeth | Chicago, Illinois | 2023 | High-rise residential | Design / develop / build | |
| Parkline Chicago Residences | Chicago, Illinois | 2021 | High-rise residential | Design / develop / build | |
| Recess and City Hall Events | Chicago, Illinois | 2020 | Adaptive reuse / event venue / restaurant | Design | |
| 145 South Wells | Chicago, Illinois | 2019 | High-rise office | Design / develop / build | |
| Linea Apartments | Chicago, Illinois | 2017 | High-rise residential | Design / develop / build | |
| JeffJack Apartments | Chicago, Illinois | 2015 | High-rise residential | Design / develop / build | |
| Morgan Manufacturing | Chicago, Illinois | 2015 | Adaptive reuse / office | Design | |
| Chicago-Kent College of Law | Chicago, Illinois | 2013 | Classroom / courtroom renovation | Design / build | |
| InterContinental-Miami | Miami, Florida | 2012 | Hospitality / rebranding of hotel Identity | Design | |
| Adler Planetarium Welcome Gallery | Chicago, Illinois | 2011 | Science museum welcome gallery | Design | |
| 7RR Eco-Home | Northfield, Illinois | 2010 | Single-family residential | Design / build | |
| Vetro Residences | Chicago, Illinois | 2008 | High-rise residential | Design / develop / build | |
| Sienna Residences | Evanston, Illinois | 2008 | Mid-rise residential | Design / develop / build | |
| Chicago Avenue Place | Evanston, Illinois | 2004 | Mid-rise residential | Design / develop / build | |
| Glass House | Northfield, Illinois | 2002 | Single-family residential | Design / build | |
| 433 North Wells Street Residences | Chicago, Illinois | 1999 | Mid-rise residential | Design / develop / build | |
