= Marina Čaljkušić =

Croatian handball player (born 1991)

Personal information
- Nationality: Croatian
- Born: 4 June 1991 (age 35) Mostar, SR Bosnia and Herzegovina, SFR Yugoslavia
- Height: 1.80 m (5 ft 11 in)

Sport
- Sport: Handball
- Position: Left back
- Current club: RK Lokomotiva Zagreb
- Number: 52 & 46
National team
Years	Team	Apps	(Gls)
–	Croatia	9	(10)

Marina Čaljkušić (née Glavan; born 4 June 1991) is a Croatian handball player for RK Lokomotiva Zagreb and the Croatian national team.

She participated at the 2018 European Women's Handball Championship.

== International honours ==
- EHF Challenge Cup:
  - Winner: 2017
