= Sylwia Matuszczyk =

Polish handball player (born 1992)

Personal information
- Nationality: Polish
- Born: 11 June 1992 (age 34) Żory, Poland
- Height: 1.72 m (5 ft 8 in)

Sport
- Sport: Handball
- Position: Pivot
- Current club: MKS Lublin
- Number: 13

Senior clubs
- Years: Team
- 2011–2015: AZS Koszalin
- 2015–2016: Start Elbląg
- 2016–2020: MKS Lublin
- 2020-2024: JKS Jarosław
- 2024–: MKS Lublin
National team
Years	Team	Apps	(Gls)
2014–	Poland	58	(96)
- Updated on 3 November 2024

Sylwia Matuszczyk (born 11 June 1992) is a Polish handball player for MKS Lublin and the Polish national team.

She participated at the 2018 European Women's Handball Championship.

== Achievements ==
- Ekstraklasa:
  - Winner: 2018
- EHF Challenge Cup:
  - Winner: 2018
