= Theodore Roszak =

Theodore Roszak may refer to:

- Theodore Roszak (artist) (1907–1981), Polish-American sculptor and painter
- Theodore Roszak (scholar) (1933–2011), historian and author of The Making of a Counterculture
