= Janez Pišek (footballer, born 1911) =

Slovenian footballer and manager

Personal information
- Date of birth: 4 March 1911
- Place of birth: Jesenice, Austria-Hungary
- Date of death: 1992 (aged 80–81)
- Place of death: Ljubljana
- Position: Midfielder

Senior career*
Years	Team	Apps	(Gls)
1927–1936	Primorje		
1936–1940	SK Ljubljana		
1940–1941	SK Mars		

Managerial career
- 1950s: ŽNK Ljubljana
- 1963–1964: Slovan
- * Club domestic league appearances and goals

Janez Pišek (4 March 1911-1992) was a Slovenian football manager and player. He played for AŠK Primorje most of his career and later managed various clubs in the Yugoslav Second League.

He became first professional Slovenian football coach and first president of Slovenian Football Coach Association in 1953. After his death he received a Blodek plaque for life work in Slovenian football.
