= Isabelle Andersson =

Swedish handball player (born 2000)

Personal information
- Nationality: Swedish
- Born: 12 March 2000 (age 26) Stockholm, Sweden
- Height: 1.78 m (5 ft 10 in)

Sport
- Sport: Handball
- Position: Left back
- Current club: Boden Handboll IF
- Number: 10

Senior clubs
- Years: Team
- 2017–2018: Spårvägens HF
- 2018–2019: Skuru IK
- 2019–2023: H 65 Höör
- 2023–2024: SG BBM Bietigheim
- 2025: H 65 Höör
- 2025–: Boden Handboll IF
National team
Years	Team	Apps	(Gls)
2020–	Sweden	6	(8)
- Updated on 25 August 2025

Isabelle Andersson (born 12 March 2000) is a Swedish handball player for Boden Handboll IFand the Swedish national team.

She was going to have her senior championship debut in the 2020 summer olympics, however four days before the tournament started she injured her knee and had to leave.

== Individual awards ==
- All-Star Team as Best defender in 2017 European U-17 Handball Championship
- All-Star Team as Best left back in 2018 Youth World Handball Championship
- "Årets Komet" 2021
