= Jasmina Pišek =

Slovenian handball player

Personal information
- Nationality: Slovenian
- Born: 24 May 1996 (age 30) Celje, Slovenia
- Height: 1.66 m (5 ft 5 in)

Sport
- Sport: Handball
- Position: Right wing
- Current club: ŽRK Celje
- Number: 17

Senior clubs
- Years: Team
- –: ŽRK Celje
National team
Years	Team	Apps	(Gls)
2018–	Slovenia	20	(28)

Jasmina Pišek (born 24 May 1996) is a Slovenian handball player for ŽRK Celje and the Slovenian national team.

She participated at the 2018 European Women's Handball Championship.
