= Daniela Rațiu =

Romanian handball player (born 1988)

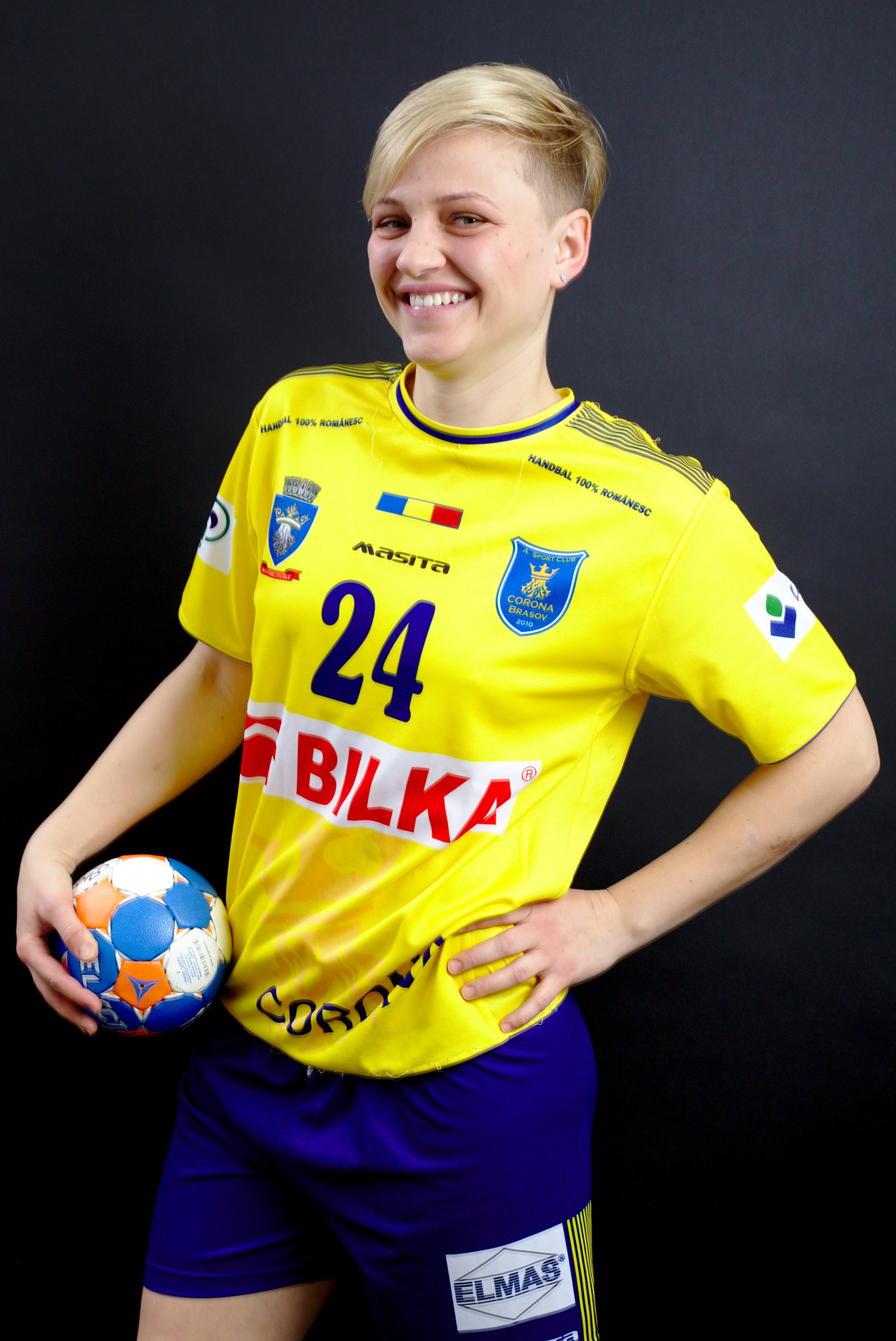

Personal information
- Full name: Daniela Constantina Rațiu
- Nationality: Romanian
- Born: 14 September 1988 (age 38) Slatina, Romania
- Height: 1.75 m (5 ft 9 in)

Sport
- Sport: Handball
- Position: Pivot
- Current club: Gloria Bistrița
- Number: 24

Youth career
- Years: Team
- –: LPS Slatina

Senior clubs
- Years: Team
- –2011: Universitatea Cluj-Napoca
- 2011–2016: Corona Brașov
- 2016–: Gloria Bistrița
National team
Years	Team	Apps	(Gls)
–	Romania	10	(4)
Medal record
Youth European Championship
Silver medal – second place	2005 Austria
Junior European Championship
Bronze medal – third place	2007 Turkey

Daniela Constantina Rațiu (born 14 September 1988) is a Romanian handball player for Gloria Bistrița.

== International honours ==
- EHF Cup:
  - Semifinalist: 2016
- Youth European Championship:
  - Silver Medalist: 2005
- Junior European Championship:
  - Bronze Medalist: 2007
