= Tajae (given name) =

Tajae is a given name. Notable people with the name include:

- Tajae Sharpe (born 1994), American football player
- Tajae Jones, in the 2024–25 Siena Saints men's basketball team, of New York, US
- Tajae Williams, of Robin Hood F.C. in Bermuda
