= Boden Handboll IF =

Swedish handball club

- Full name: Boden Handboll Idrottsförening
- Founded: 29 April 2009; 17 years ago
- Arena: Bodens Energi Arena
- Capacity: 1,500
- President: Alina Maglic
- Head coach: Andreas Wallin
- League: Handbollsligan
- 2025-26: 5th
Home	Away

Boden Handboll IF is a handball club from Boden, Sweden. It is most famous for its women's team, whom currently competes in top division of the Swedish handball system, Handbollsligan.

== History ==
Boden Handboll IF was founded on 26 April 2009. The discontinuation of Hornskrokens IF women's handball team, lead to foundation of the club.

The women's handball team started in Division 2, the fourth tier of Swedish handball, and in 2009-10 and 2010-11 they managed back-to-back promotions and reached the Allsvenskan.

They were promoted to the top division of Sweden, the Handbollsligan, for the first time in 2015–16 after finishing 2nd in the Allsvenskan and beating Önnereds HK in the playoff. Their best ever result was an 8th place in 2017–18. In 2020–21 they were relegated again. In the 2024-25 season they were promoted to the top league again.

== Team ==
=== Current squad ===
Squad for the 2026–27 season

Goalkeepers

- 1 (Sweden) Sofie Börjesson
- 23 (Sweden) Selma Hasanbegovic

Wingers
LW

- 7 (Sweden) Line Hegglund
- 21 (Sweden) Ida Lindlöf

RW

- 14 (Denmark) Nicoline Vendelborg
- 45 (Netherlands) Donna Bakker

Line players

- 8 (Sweden) Frida Höglund
- 17 (Sweden) Elsa Öst
- 26 (Denmark) Lina Lützhof

Back players
LB

- 9 (Sweden) Lisa Hansson
- 10 (Sweden) Isabelle Andersson
- 20 (Sweden) Moa Nilsson

CB

- 19 (Norway) Lorin Sendi
- 24 (Sweden) Mia Lagdumzija

RB

- 4 (Denmark) Carla Høck Thomsen
- 11 (Sweden) Sara Nordström

=== Transfers ===
Transfers for the 2027-28 season.

Joining

Leaving

=== Technical staff ===
- (Sweden) Head Coach: Andreas Wallin
- (Sweden) Assistant coach: Annika Olén
- (Sweden) Physiotherapist: Gustav Oscarsson
- (Sweden) Team Leader: Hans Lundqvist
- (Sweden) Team Leader: Roger Sjöhem
- (Sweden) Team Leader: Anders Eliasson
