= Taja Čajko =

Slovenian handball player

Personal information
- Nationality: Slovenian
- Born: 27 July 1993 (age 33) Trbovlje, Slovenia
- Height: 1.78 m (5 ft 10 in)

Sport
- Sport: Handball
- Position: Line player
- Current club: ŽRK Mlinotest Ajdovščina
- Number: 15

Senior clubs
- Years: Team
- –: ŽRK Mlinotest Ajdovščina
National team
Years	Team	Apps	(Gls)
2018–	Slovenia	3	(0)

Taja Čajko (born 27 July 1993) is a Slovenian female handball player for ŽRK Mlinotest Ajdovščina and the Slovenian national team.

She participated at the 2018 European Women's Handball Championship.

== Achievements ==
- Slovenian First League:
  - Bronze Medalist: 2016
