= ŽRK Z'dežele =

Slovenian handball club

- Full name: Ženski rokometni klub Z'dežele
- Arena: Golovec Hall, Celje
- Capacity: 3,200
- President: Izidor Krivec
- League: Slovenian First League
- 2025–26: Slovenian First League, 10th of 13
- Club colours
Home	Away

Ženski rokometni klub Z'dežele or simply ŽRK Z'dežele is a women's handball club from Celje, Slovenia.
