= Leszek Krowicki =

Polish handball player and coach (born 1957)

Personal information
- Nationality: Polish
- Born: 9 November 1957 (age 68) Gdańsk, Poland
- Height: 1.86 m (6 ft 1 in)

Sport
- Sport: Handball
- Position: Left wing

Senior clubs
- Years: Team
- -1986: Wybrzeże Gdańsk
- 1989-1990: HSG Verden-Aller
National team
| Years | Team | Apps |
| – | Poland | 26 |

Teams managed
- 1986-1989: Start Gdańsk
- 1987-1988: Polish women's national team (assistant)
- 1989-1990: HSG Verden-Aller (player-coach)
- 1990-1991: TuS Walle Bremen (assistant)
- 1991-1995: TuS Walle Bremen
- 1995-1998: Netherlands men's national team
- 1998-1999: TSG Bielefeld
- 1999-2004: Buxtehuder SV
- 2005-2017: VfL Oldenburg
- 2016-2019: Polish women's national team
- 2021-: TV Cloppenburg

Leszek Krowicki (born 9 November 1957 in Gdańsk) is a Polish former handball player and current handball coach who previously coached the Polish women's national team and the Netherlands men's national team. As a player he also played for the Poland men's national handball team. As a player he won the Polish championship twidce in 1984 and 1985.

As a coach he won the Championship championship three times and the EHF Cup Winners' Cup with TuS Walle Bremen and the EHF Challenge Cup with VfL Oldenburg.
