= Piotrcovia Piotrków Trybunalski =

Polish handball club

- Full name: MKS Piotrcovia Piotrków Trybunalski
- Founded: 1968
- Arena: Hala Relax
- Capacity: 1,000
- President: Marek Ostrowski
- Head coach: Andrzej Bystram
- League: Ekstraklasa
- 2022–23: 4th

Piotrcovia Piotrków Trybunalski is a women's Polish handball team, based in Piotrków Trybunalski.

== Current squad ==
Squad for the 2018–19 season

Goalkeepers

- 1 (Poland) Natalia Kolasińska
- 16 (Poland) Daria Opelt
- 69 (Poland) Karolina Sarnecka

Wingers
LW

- 5 (Poland) Marta Osuch
- 51 (Ukraine) Vladyslava Belmas
- 57 (Poland) Zuzanna Gajewska

RW

- 19 (Poland) Patrycja Ciura
- 10 (Poland) Aleksandra Zaleśny

Line players

- 7 (Poland) Sylwia Klonowska
- 29 (Montenegro) Andleja Ivanović

Back players
LB

- 11 (Poland) Monika Kopertowska
- 23 (Poland) Klaudia Cygan
- 55 (North Macedonia) Zorica Despodovska

CB

- 15 (Poland) Agata Wypych
- 17 (Poland) Anna Wasilewska
- 22 (Poland) Kinga Gutkowska

RB

- 8 (Poland) Żaneta Senderkiewicz
- 73 (Poland) Kornelia Małecka

== See also ==
- Handball in Poland
- Sports in Poland
