= Carpathian Trophy (women's handball) =

Female handball sporting event

The Carpathian Trophy (Romanian: Trofeul Carpaţi) is an annual women's friendly handball tournament organised by the Romanian Handball Federation. The first edition took place in Bucharest in 1959.

== Tournament structure ==
So far, 54 editions of the tournament have been played. The tournament doesn't have an exact format, however, in most recent years, competitions usually included four participating teams (with only three instances when six teams participated).

== Editions ==
Year	Host city	Final Rankings
Year	Host city	Gold	Silver	Bronze	Fourth place	Fifth place	Sixth place
2001; Details	(Romania); Cluj-Napoca	Romania	Spain	Serbia and Montenegro	Romania B	Poland	Macedonia
2002; Details	(Romania); Cluj-Napoca	Ukraine	Romania	Russia	Serbia and Montenegro
2004; Details	(Romania); Cluj-Napoca	Romania	Serbia	Netherlands	Germany
2005; Details	(Romania); Cluj-Napoca	Romania	Slovakia	Croatia	Azerbaijan
2006; Details	(Romania); Cluj-Napoca	Romania	South Korea	Macedonia	Croatia	Serbia	Romania B
2007; Details	(Romania); Cluj-Napoca	Romania	Spain	Croatia	Romania B
2008; Details	(Romania); Cluj-Napoca	Romania	Ukraine	Germany	Croatia
2010; Details	(Romania); Drobeta-Turnu Severin	Romania	Poland	Ukraine	Macedonia
2011; Details	(Romania); Drobeta-Turnu Severin	Romania	Serbia	Hungary	Macedonia
2012; Details	(Romania); Oradea	Romania	Hungary	Ukraine	Romania B
2013; Details	(Romania); Craiova	Romania	Germany	Spain	Romania B
2015; Details	(Romania); Cluj-Napoca	Sweden	Romania	Germany	Brazil
2016; Details	(Romania); Cluj-Napoca	Hungary	Romania	Netherlands	Romania B
2017; Details	(Romania); Craiova	Poland	Romania	Brazil	North Macedonia
2018; Details	(Romania); Bucuresti	Romania	Romania B	Russia	Serbia
2019; Details	(Romania); Braila	Angola	Romania	Japan	Romania B
2022; Details	(Romania); Bistrita	Romania	Serbia	Spain	Austria
2023; Details	(Romania); Bistrita	Romania	Austria	Switzerland	Portugal
2024; Details	(Romania); Cluj-Napoca	Switzerland	Brazil	Slovakia	Romania	North Macedonia	Turkey

- The 2003, 2009, 2014, 2020, and 2021 editions were not held due to various reasons.

== Summary ==
Team	Wins
Romania	34
Germany	8
Denmark	2
Serbia	2
Angola	1
Hungary	1
Poland	1
Russia	1
Sweden	1
Switzerland	1
Ukraine	1

== See also ==
- Carpathian Trophy (men's handball)
