= 2018–19 Liga Națională (women's handball) =

2015–16 Liga Națională
- Season champions: Râmnicu Vâlcea
- Runners-up: CSM București
- Relegated to Divizia A: Roman; Danubius Galați

Seasons
- ← 2017–18 2019–20 →

The 2018–19 Liga Națională is the 61st season of Liga Națională, the Romanian top-level women's professional handball league. The league comprises 14 teams. CSM București are the defending champions, for the fourth season in a row. SCM Râmnicu Vâlcea won the title for the first time since 2013.

== Team changes ==
=== To Liga Națională ===
Promoted from Divizia A

- Gloria Buzău
- Minaur Baia Mare

=== From Liga Națională ===
Relegated to Divizia A

- Slobozia
- Rapid București

== Teams for season 2018–19 ==
Location of teams in the Romanian Women's Handball League

Club	City	Arena(s)	Capacity
CSM București	Bucharest	Sala Polivalentă	5,300
CSM Slatina	Slatina	Sala LPS Slatina	200
Corona Brașov	Brașov	Sala Sporturilor "D.P. Colibași"	1,600
CSM Roman	Roman	Sala Polivalentă Roman	500
Danubius Galați	Galați	Sala Sporturilor "Dunărea"	1,500
Dunărea Brăila	Brăila	Sala Polivalentă "Danubius"	2,000
Gloria Bistrița	Bistrița	Sala Polivalentă Bistrița	900
Gloria Buzău	Buzău	Sala Sporturilor "Romeo Iamandi"	1,868
HC Zalău	Zalău	Sala Sporturilor Zalău	950
SCM Râmnicu Vâlcea	Râmnicu Vâlcea	Sala Sporturilor "Traian"	3,126
Măgura Cisnădie	Cisnădie	Sala Polivalentă "Măgura"	820
Minaur Baia Mare	Baia Mare	Sala Sporturilor "Lascăr Pană"	2,048
SCM Craiova	Craiova	Sala Polivalentă Craiova	4,215
Universitatea Cluj	Cluj-Napoca	Sala Sporturilor "Horia Demian"; BT Arena	2,525; 9,300

== League table ==
Pos	Team	Pld	W	D	L	GF	GA	GD	Pts	Qualification
1	Râmnicu Vâlcea (C, Q)	24	22	0	2	654	539	+115	66 (Note: CSM București–Râmnicu Vâlcea 19–22; Râmnicu Vâlcea–CSM București 29–30)	Qualification to EHF Champions League
2	CSM București (Q)	24	22	0	2	708	565	+143	66	Qualification to EHF Cup
3	Gloria Bistrița (Q)	24	14	0	10	598	587	+11	42	Qualification to EHF Cup
4	Măgura Cisnădie (Q)	24	13	2	9	579	575	+4	41	Qualification to EHF Cup
5	Corona Brașov	24	13	1	10	607	598	+9	40	
6	Craiova	24	13	0	11	579	558	+21	39	
7	Gloria Buzău	24	10	3	11	568	575	−7	33 (Note: Gloria Buzău–Zalău 25–24; Zalău–Gloria Buzău 26–26)	
8	Zalău	24	10	3	11	647	650	−3	33	
9	Dunărea Brăila	24	9	2	13	576	593	−17	29	
10	Minaur Baia Mare	24	9	1	14	577	601	−24	28	
11	Slatina (O)	24	8	2	14	551	589	−38	26	Qualification to Relegation play-offs
12	Universitatea Cluj (O)	24	4	0	20	620	704	−84	12	Qualification to Relegation play-offs
13	Danubius Galați (R)	24	1	2	21	502	632	−130	5	Relegation to Divizia A
14	Roman (E)	0	0	0	0	0	0	0	0 (Note: Roman withdrew from the championship in the first part of the season and all their results were canceled.)	Withdrew

Source: Romanian Handball Federation (in Romanian)
Rules for classification: Rules for classification: 1) Points; 2) Head-to-head points; 3) Head-to-head goal difference; 4) Head-to-head goals scored; 5) Head-to-head away goals scored; 6) Goal difference; 7) Goals scored.
(C) Champions; (E) Eliminated; (O) Play-off winners; (Q) Qualified for the phase indicated; (R) Relegated

== Promotion/relegation play-offs ==
The 3rd and 4th-placed teams of the Divizia A promotion tournament faced the 11th and 12th-placed teams of the Liga Națională. The first two places promoted to Liga Națională and the last two relegated to Divizia A. The play-offs were played on neutral ground, in Cisnădie.

Pos	Team	Pld	W	D	L	GF	GA	GD	Pts	Qualification
1	Universitatea Cluj (C, P)	3	2	1	0	82	68	+14	7	Promoted to Liga Națională
2	Slatina (P)	3	2	0	1	74	72	+2	6	Promoted to Liga Națională
3	Dacia Mioveni (R)	3	1	1	1	80	67	+13	4	Relegated to Divizia A
4	Târgu Mureș (R)	3	0	0	3	65	94	−29	0	Relegated to Divizia A

Updated to match(es) played on Ccomplete. Source: Romanian Handball Federation (in Romanian)
Rules for classification: Rules for classification: 1) Points; 2) Goal difference; 3) Goals scored;
(C) Champions; (P) Promoted; (R) Relegated

== Season statistics ==
=== Number of teams by counties ===
Pos.	County	No. of teams	Teams
1	Bistrița-Năsăud	1	Gloria Bistrița
1	Brașov	1	Corona Brașov
1	Brăila	1	Dunărea Brăila
1	Bucharest (capital)	1	CSM București
1	Buzău	1	Gloria Buzău
1	Cluj	1	Universitatea Cluj
1	Dolj	1	Craiova
1	Galați	1	Danubius Galați
1	Maramureș	1	Minaur Baia Mare
1	Neamț	1	Roman
1	Olt	1	Slatina
1	Sălaj	1	Zalău
1	Sibiu	1	Măgura Cisnădie
1	Vâlcea	1	Râmnicu Vâlcea
