= 2017–18 Liga Națională (women's handball) =

2015–16 Liga Națională
- Season champions: CSM București
- Runners-up: SCM Craiova
- Relegated to Divizia A: HCM Slobozia; Rapid București

Seasons
- 2016–17 2018–19

The 2017–18 Liga Națională was the 60th season of Liga Națională, the top-level women's professional handball league. The league comprises 14 teams. CSM București were the defending champions, for the third season in a row, and they won the title once again.

== Team changes ==
=== To Liga Națională ===
Promoted from Divizia A

- Rapid București
- CSM Slatina

=== From Liga Națională ===
Relegated to Divizia A

- —

== Teams for season 2017–18 ==
Location of teams in the Romanian Women's Handball League

Club	City	Arena(s)	Capacity
CSM Bistrița	Bistrița	Sala Polivalentă Bistrița	900
CSM București	Bucharest	Sala Polivalentă	5,300
CSM Slatina	Slatina	Sala LPS Slatina	200
Corona Brașov	Brașov	Sala Sporturilor "D.P. Colibași"	1,600
CSM Roman	Roman	Sala Polivalentă Roman	500
Danubius Galați	Galați	Sala Sporturilor Dunărea	1,500
Dunărea Brăila	Brăila	Sala Polivalentă „Danubius”	2,000
HC Zalău	Zalău	Sala Sporturilor Zalău	950
HCM Râmnicu Vâlcea	Râmnicu Vâlcea	Sala Sporturilor „Traian”	3,126
HCM Slobozia	Slobozia	Sala Sporturilor "Andreea Nica"	150
Măgura Cisnădie	Cisnădie	Sala Polivalentă Măgura	820
Rapid București	Bucharest	Sala "Rapid"	1,500
SCM Craiova	Craiova	Sala Polivalentă Craiova	4,215
Universitatea Cluj	Cluj-Napoca	Sala Sporturilor „Horia Demian” Sala Polivalentă Cluj	2,525; 7,308

== League table ==
=== Standings ===
Pos	Team	Pld	W	D	L	GF	GA	GD	Pts	Qualification or relegation
1	CSM București (C, Q)	26	25	0	1	821	573	+248	75	Qualification for the EHF Champions League
2	SCM Craiova (Q)	26	18	4	4	669	573	+96	58	Qualification for the EHF Cup
3	Măgura Cisnădie (Q)	26	18	3	5	665	598	+67	57	Qualification for the EHF Cup
4	HCM Râmnicu Vâlcea (Q)	26	16	1	9	665	601	+64	49	Qualification for the EHF Cup
5	HC Zalău	26	15	2	9	686	632	+54	47	
6	CSM Bistrița	26	13	3	10	685	672	+13	42	
7	Corona Brașov	26	13	0	13	680	692	−12	39	
8	CSM Roman	26	12	0	14	636	655	−19	36	
9	Dunărea Brăila	26	9	3	14	577	632	−55	30	
10	Universitatea Cluj	26	8	2	16	655	733	−78	26 (Note: SLA-UCJ 22-22; UCJ-SLA 28-23)	
11	CSM Slatina (Q)	26	8	2	16	598	649	−51	26	Relegation play-offs
12	Danubius Galați (Q)	26	7	0	19	513	591	−78	21	Relegation play-offs
13	HCM Slobozia (R)	26	5	2	19	563	678	−115	17	Relegation to Divizia A
14	Rapid București (R)	26	4	0	22	641	775	−134	12	Relegation to Divizia A

Updated to match(es) played on 20 May 2018. Source: FRH (in Romanian)
Rules for classification: 1st points; 2nd head-to-head points; 3rd head-to-head goal difference; 4th head-to-head goals scored; 5th head-to-head away goals scored; 6th goal difference; 7th number of goals scored
(C) Champions; (Q) Qualified for the phase indicated; (R) Relegated

== Liga Națională play-offs ==
The 11th and 12th-placed teams of the Liga Națională faced the 2nd and 3rd-placed teams of the Divizia A, from both Seria A and Seria B. The first place from each play-off group promoted to Liga Națională.

=== Serie I ===
Pos	Team	Pld	W	D	L	GF	GA	GD	Pts	Promotion
1	CSM Slatina (P)	2	2	0	0	68	49	+19	6	Promotion to Liga Națională
2	Neptun Constanța	2	1	0	1	47	61	−14	3	
3	CS Mioveni	2	0	0	2	43	48	−5	0	

Updated to match(es) played on 26 May 2018. Source: FRH (in Romanian)
Rules for classification: 1st points; 2nd head-to-head points; 3rd head-to-head goal difference; 4th head-to-head goals scored; 5th head-to-head away goals scored; 6th goal difference; 7th number of goals scored
(P) Promoted

=== Serie II ===
Pos	Team	Pld	W	D	L	GF	GA	GD	Pts	Promotion
1	Danubius Galați (P)	2	2	0	0	62	39	+23	6	Promotion to Liga Națională
2	SCM Timișoara	2	1	0	1	47	44	+3	3	
3	Știința București	2	0	0	2	37	63	−26	0	

Updated to match(es) played on 26 May 2018. Source: FRH (in Romanian)
Rules for classification: 1st points; 2nd head-to-head points; 3rd head-to-head goal difference; 4th head-to-head goals scored; 5th head-to-head away goals scored; 6th goal difference; 7th number of goals scored
(P) Promoted

== Season statistics ==
=== Number of teams by counties ===
Pos.	County	No. of teams	Teams
1	Bucharest (capital)	2	CSM București; Rapid București
2	Bistrița-Năsăud	1	CSM Bistrița
2	Brașov	1	Corona Brașov
2	Brăila	1	Dunărea Brăila
2	Cluj	1	Universitatea Cluj
2	Dolj	1	SCM Craiova
2	Galați	1	Danubius Galați
2	Ialomița	1	HCM Slobozia
2	Neamț	1	CSM Roman
2	Olt	1	CSM Slatina
2	Sălaj	1	HC Zalău
2	Sibiu	1	Măgura Cisnădie
2	Vâlcea	1	HCM Râmnicu Vâlcea
