= 2019–20 Liga Națională (women's handball) =

2019–20 Liga Națională
Previous: 2018–19	Next: 2020–21

The 2019–20 Liga Națională is the 62nd season of Liga Națională, the Romanian top-level women's professional handball league. The league comprises 14 teams. SCM Râmnicu Vâlcea were the defending champions, for the first time since 2013.

== Team changes ==
=== To Liga Națională ===
Promoted from Divizia A

- Rapid București
- Slobozia

=== From Liga Națională ===
Relegated to Divizia A

- Danubius Galați
- Roman

== Teams for season 2019–20 ==
Location of teams in the Romanian Women's Handball League.

Club	City	Arena(s)	Capacity
CSM București	Bucharest	Sala Polivalentă	5,300
CSM Slatina	Slatina	Sala LPS Slatina	200
Corona Brașov	Brașov	Sala Sporturilor "D.P. Colibași"	1,600
Dunărea Brăila	Brăila	Sala Polivalentă "Danubius"	2,000
Gloria Bistrița	Bistrița	Sala Polivalentă Bistrița	900
Gloria Buzău	Buzău	Sala Sporturilor "Romeo Iamandi"	1,868
HC Zalău	Zalău	Sala Sporturilor Zalău	950
HCM Slobozia	Slobozia	Sala Sporturilor "Andreea Nica"	150
SCM Râmnicu Vâlcea	Râmnicu Vâlcea	Sala Sporturilor "Traian"	3,126
Măgura Cisnădie	Cisnădie	Sala Polivalentă "Măgura"	820
Minaur Baia Mare	Baia Mare	Sala Sporturilor "Lascăr Pană"	2,048
Rapid București	Bucharest	Sala "Rapid"	1,500
SCM Craiova	Craiova	Sala Polivalentă Craiova	4,215
Universitatea Cluj	Cluj-Napoca	Sala Sporturilor "Horia Demian"; BT Arena	2,525; 9,300

== League table ==
Pos	Team	Pld	W	D	L	GF	GA	GD	Pts	Qualification
1	Râmnicu Vâlcea	12	10	1	1	317	258	+59	31	Qualification to EHF Champions League
2	CSM București	12	9	1	2	334	271	+63	28	Qualification to EHF Cup
3	Corona Brașov	11	8	2	1	307	272	+35	26	Qualification to EHF Cup
4	Gloria Buzău	12	8	1	3	312	286	+26	25	Qualification to EHF Cup
5	Gloria Bistrița	12	8	0	4	291	277	+14	24	
6	Minaur Baia Mare	12	7	2	3	302	284	+18	23	
7	Dunărea Brăila	12	6	0	6	307	297	+10	18	
8	Zalău	12	6	0	6	290	282	+8	18	
9	Măgura Cisnădie	12	5	1	6	306	295	+11	16	
10	Craiova	11	5	0	6	238	255	−17	15	
11	Slatina	12	3	1	8	265	307	−42	10	Qualification to Relegation play-offs
12	Slobozia	12	1	1	10	269	314	−45	4	Qualification to Relegation play-offs
13	Universitatea Cluj	12	1	0	11	278	347	−69	3	Relegation to Divizia A
14	Rapid București	12	1	0	11	248	319	−71	3	Relegation to Divizia A

Source: Romanian Handball Federation (in Romanian)
Rules for classification: Rules for classification: 1) Points; 2) Head-to-head points; 3) Head-to-head goal difference; 4) Head-to-head goals scored; 5) Head-to-head away goals scored; 6) Goal difference; 7) Goals scored.

== Promotion/relegation play-offs ==
The 3rd and 4th-placed teams of the Divizia A promotion tournament faced the 11th and 12th-placed teams of the Liga Națională. The first two places promoted to Liga Națională and the last two relegated to Divizia A. The play-offs were played on neutral ground.

Pos	Team	Pld	W	D	L	GF	GA	GD	Pts	Qualification
1	TBD	0	0	0	0	0	0	0	0	Promoted to Liga Națională
2	TBD	0	0	0	0	0	0	0	0	Promoted to Liga Națională
3	TBD	0	0	0	0	0	0	0	0	Relegated to Divizia A
4	TBD	0	0	0	0	0	0	0	0	Relegated to Divizia A

Updated to match(es) played on Ccomplete. Source: Romanian Handball Federation (in Romanian)
Rules for classification: Rules for classification: 1) Points; 2) Goal difference; 3) Goals scored;

== Season statistics ==
=== Number of teams by counties ===
Pos.	County	No. of teams	Teams
1	Bucharest (capital)	2	CSM București and Rapid București
2	Bistrița-Năsăud	1	Gloria Bistrița
2	Brașov	1	Corona Brașov
2	Brăila	1	Dunărea Brăila
2	Buzău	1	Gloria Buzău
2	Cluj	1	Universitatea Cluj
2	Dolj	1	Craiova
2	Ialomița	1	Slobozia
2	Maramureș	1	Minaur Baia Mare
2	Olt	1	Slatina
2	Sălaj	1	Zalău
2	Sibiu	1	Măgura Cisnădie
2	Vâlcea	1	Râmnicu Vâlcea
