= 2017–18 Divizia A (women's handball) =

Seasons
- 2016–17 2018–19

The 2017–18 Divizia A was the 60th season of the Romanian women's handball second league. A total of 29 teams contested the league, being divided in two series, Seria A (15 teams) and Seria B (14 teams). At the end of the season the first place from both series promoted to Liga Națională, the 2nd and 3rd places from both series played a promotion play-off together with 11th and 12th place from Liga Națională.

== Team changes ==
=== To Divizia A ===
Relegated from Liga Națională

- —

=== From Divizia A ===
Promoted to Liga Națională

- Rapid București
- CSM Slatina

=== Excluded teams ===
- Extrem Baia Mare, Național Brașov and Sepsi SIC withdrew from Divizia A.

=== Enrolled teams ===
- CSS Tulcea, Danubius Călărași and Steaua București (Seria A)
- Corona II Brașov, KSE Târgu Secuiesc, Național Râmnicu Vâlcea, Odorheiu Secuiesc, Olimpic Târgu Mureș and SCM Timișoara (Seria B)

=== Renamed teams ===
- SCM Pitești was renamed in the summer of 2017 as Argeș Pitești.

=== Other teams ===
- Argeș Pitești was moved from Seria A to Seria B.

== Teams ==
=== Seria A ===
Location of teams in the Women's Divizia A (Seria A)

Club	Ground(s)	Capacity
CNOT Iași	Sala LPS	100
CSM București II	Sala Sporturilor "Rapid"	1,500
CSO Plopeni	Sala Polivalentă	500
CSS Tulcea	Sala Polivalentă	1,200
CSU Târgoviște	Sala Sporturilor	2,000
Danubius Călărași	Sala Polivalentă	1,500
Dinamo București	Sala Dinamo	2,538
Gloria Buzău	Sala Sporturilor "Romeo Iamandi"	1,868
HCF Piatra Neamț	Sala Polivalentă	4,000
Neptun Constanța	Sala Sporturilor	2,100
Spartac București	Sala Iris	100
SSP București	Sala Iris	100
Steaua București	Sala CSS 6	100
Știința Bacău	Sala Sporturilor	2,000
Știința București	Sala Iris	100

=== Seria B ===
Location of teams in the Women's Divizia A (Seria B)

Club	Ground(s)	Capacity
Argeș Pitești	Sala Universității	400
Corona II Brașov	Sala Sporturilor "D.P. Colibași"	1,600
Crișul Chișineu Criș	Sala Sporturilor "Victoria" (Arad)	1,500
CSU Oradea	Sala Universitatea	100
CSU Reșița	Sala Polivalentă	1,669
KSE Târgu Secuiesc	Sala Sporturilor	200
Minaur Baia Mare	Sala Sporturilor "Lascăr Pană"	2,048
CS Mioveni	Sala Sporturilor "Trivale" (Pitești)	2,000
Mureșul Târgu Mureș	Sala Sporturilor	2,000
Național Râmnicu Vâlcea	Sala Energetic	100
Odorheiu Secuiesc	Sala Sporturilor	1,250
Olimpic Târgu Mureș	Sala ȘG "Liviu Rebreanu"	100
SCM Timișoara	Sala "Constantin Jude"	1,540
UV Timișoara	Sala Universității	150

== League tables ==
=== Seria A ===
Pos	Team	Pld	W	D	L	GF	GA	GD	Pts	Promotion or qualification
1	Gloria Buzău (C, P)	28	28	0	0	999	634	+365	84	Promotion to Liga Națională
2	Neptun Constanța (Q)	28	24	0	4	908	675	+233	72	Qualification to Promotion play-offs
3	Știința București (Q)	28	20	2	6	818	661	+157	62	Qualification to Promotion play-offs
4	CSM București II	28	19	2	7	842	741	+101	59	
5	HCF Piatra Neamț	28	19	1	8	806	637	+169	58	
6	Dinamo București	28	19	0	9	806	677	+129	57	
7	CSS Tulcea	28	16	2	10	766	751	+15	50	
8	Steaua București	28	11	3	14	830	833	−3	36	
9	CNOT Iași	28	11	2	15	788	804	−16	35	
10	Știința Bacău	28	10	0	18	754	832	−78	30	
11	CSO Plopeni	28	8	0	20	800	869	−69	24	
12	SSP București	28	7	1	20	743	834	−91	21 (Note: SSP București was deducted 1 point for violating the rules.)	
13	CSU Târgoviște	28	4	1	23	618	959	−341	13	
14	Danubius Călărași	28	4	0	24	671	907	−236	12	
15	Spartac București	28	2	2	24	530	865	−335	8	

Updated to match(es) played on 22 May 2018. Source: FRH (in Romanian)
Rules for classification: 1st points; 2nd head-to-head points; 3rd head-to-head goal difference; 4th head-to-head goals scored; 5th head-to-head away goals scored; 6th goal difference; 7th number of goals scored
(C) Champions; (P) Promoted; (Q) Qualified for the phase indicated
Notes:

^{1}

=== Seria B ===
Pos	Team	Pld	W	D	L	GF	GA	GD	Pts	Promotion or qualification
1	Minaur Baia Mare (C, P)	22	21	1	0	713	480	+233	64	Promotion to Liga Națională
2	SCM Timișoara (Q)	22	19	0	3	696	533	+163	57	Qualification to Promotion play-offs
3	CS Mioveni (Q)	22	13	1	8	551	498	+53	40	Qualification to Promotion play-offs
4	Corona II Brașov	22	13	1	8	623	627	−4	40	
5	CSU Reșița	22	11	0	11	550	527	+23	33	
6	Național Râmnicu Vâlcea	22	10	1	11	558	551	+7	31	
7	Argeș Pitești	22	10	1	11	613	609	+4	31	
8	Olimpic Târgu Mureș	22	10	1	11	600	626	−26	31	
9	CSU Oradea	22	9	3	10	574	610	−36	30	
10	UV Timișoara	22	6	0	16	601	693	−92	18	
11	Crișul Chișineu Criș	22	5	1	16	602	692	−90	16	
12	Odorheiu Secuiesc	22	0	0	22	326	561	−235	−7 (Note: Odorheiu Secuiesc were deducted 7 points. 5 points for double players legitimation and 2 points for non-compliance with age requirements.)	
13	KSE Târgu Secuiesc (E)	0	0	0	0	0	0	0	0 (Note: KSE Târgu Secuiesc and Mureșul Târgu Mureș were excluded from the competition.)	Excluded from Divizia A
14	Mureșul Târgu Mureș (E)	0	0	0	0	0	0	0	0	Excluded from Divizia A

Updated to match(es) played on 12 May 2018. Source: FRH (in Romanian)
Rules for classification: 1st points; 2nd head-to-head points; 3rd head-to-head goal difference; 4th head-to-head goals scored; 5th head-to-head away goals scored; 6th goal difference; 7th number of goals scored
(C) Champions; (E) Eliminated; (P) Promoted; (Q) Qualified for the phase indicated

== Promotion play-offs ==
The 11th and 12th-placed teams of the Liga Națională faced the 2nd and 3rd-placed teams of the Divizia A, from both Seria A and Seria B. The first place from each play-off group promoted to Liga Națională.

=== Serie I ===
Pos	Team	Pld	W	D	L	GF	GA	GD	Pts	Promotion
1	CSM Slatina (P)	2	2	0	0	68	49	+19	6	Promotion to Liga Națională
2	Neptun Constanța	2	1	0	1	47	61	−14	3	
3	CS Mioveni	2	0	0	2	43	48	−5	0	

Updated to match(es) played on 26 May 2018. Source: FRH (in Romanian)
Rules for classification: 1st points; 2nd head-to-head points; 3rd head-to-head goal difference; 4th head-to-head goals scored; 5th head-to-head away goals scored; 6th goal difference; 7th number of goals scored
(P) Promoted

=== Serie II ===
Pos	Team	Pld	W	D	L	GF	GA	GD	Pts	Promotion
1	Danubius Galați (P)	2	2	0	0	62	39	+23	6	Promotion to Liga Națională
2	SCM Timișoara	2	1	0	1	47	44	+3	3	
3	Știința București	2	0	0	2	37	63	−26	0	

Updated to match(es) played on 26 May 2018. Source: FRH (in Romanian)
Rules for classification: 1st points; 2nd head-to-head points; 3rd head-to-head goal difference; 4th head-to-head goals scored; 5th head-to-head away goals scored; 6th goal difference; 7th number of goals scored
(P) Promoted
