= 2018–19 Divizia A (women's handball) =

Seasons
- 2017–18 2019–20

The 2018–19 Divizia A is the 61st season of the Romanian women's handball second league. A total of 27 teams contested the league, being divided in four series, Seria A (6 teams), Seria B (8 teams), Seria C (7 teams) and Seria D (6 teams). At the end of the season the first two places from each series will qualify for the Divizia A promotion play-off.

== Team changes ==
=== To Divizia A ===
Relegated from Liga Națională

- HCM Slobozia
- Rapid București

=== From Divizia A ===
Promoted to Liga Națională

- Gloria Buzău
- Minaur Baia Mare

=== Excluded teams ===
- Corona II Brașov
- CSS Tulcea
- KSE Târgu Secuiesc
- Mureșul Târgu Mureș
- SCM Timișoara

=== Other teams ===
- Olimpic Târgu Mureș merged with the new formed CSM Târgu Mureș.
- Dunărea Brăila and Minaur Baia Mare enrolled their second teams Dunărea II and Minaur II.
- LPS Târgu Jiu was enrolled in the league.

== Teams ==
=== Seria A ===
Location of teams in the Seria A.

Club	Ground(s)	Capacity
CNOT Iași	Sala LPS	100
Dunărea II Brăila	Sala Polivalentă "Danubius"	2,000
HCF Piatra Neamț	Sala Polivalentă	4,000
HCM Slobozia	Sala Sporturilor "Andreea Nica"	150
Neptun Constanța	Sala Sporturilor	2,100
Știința Bacău	Sala Sporturilor	2,000

=== Seria B ===
Location of teams in the Seria B.

Club	Ground(s)	Capacity
CSM București II	Sala Sporturilor "Rapid"	1,500
Danubius Călărași	Sala Polivalentă	1,500
Dinamo București	Sala Dinamo	2,538
Rapid București	Sala "Rapid"	1,500
Spartac București	Sala Iris	100
SSP București	Sala Iris	100
Steaua București	Sala CSS 6	100
Știința București	Sala Iris	100

=== Seria C ===
Location of teams in the Seria C.

Club	Ground(s)	Capacity
Argeș Pitești	Sala Universității	400
CSO Plopeni	Sala Polivalentă	500
CSU Târgoviște	Sala Sporturilor	2,000
Dacia Mioveni	Sala Sporturilor "Trivale" (Pitești)	2,000
LPS Târgu Jiu	Sala Sporturilor	1,500
Național Râmnicu Vâlcea	Sala Energetic	100
Odorheiu Secuiesc	Sala Sporturilor	1,250

=== Seria D ===
Location of teams in the Seria D.

Club	Ground(s)	Capacity
Crișul Chișineu-Criș	Sala Sporturilor "Victoria" (Arad)	1,500
CSM Târgu Mureș	Sala Sporturilor	2,000
CSU Oradea	Sala Universitatea	100
CSU Reșița	Sala Polivalentă	1,669
Minaur Baia Mare	Sala Sporturilor "Lascăr Pană"	2,048
UV Timișoara	Sala Universității	150

== League tables ==
=== Seria A ===
Pos	Team	Pld	W	D	L	GF	GA	GD	Pts	Qualification
1	Slobozia (C, Q)	20	18	0	2	631	454	+177	54	Qualification to Promotion play-offs
2	Neptun Constanța (Q)	20	14	2	4	633	522	+111	44	Qualification to Promotion play-offs
3	Piatra Neamț	20	12	2	6	567	517	+50	38	
4	Dunărea II Brăila	20	5	1	14	504	569	−65	16	Ineligible for promotion
5	Știința Bacău	20	4	1	15	501	603	−102	13	
6	CNOT Iași	20	4	0	16	468	639	−171	12	

Updated to match(es) played on 18 April 2019. Source: Romanian Handball Federation (in Romanian)
Rules for classification: Rules for classification: 1) Points; 2) Goal difference; 3) Goals scored;
(C) Champions; (Q) Qualified for the phase indicated

=== Seria B ===
Pos	Team	Pld	W	D	L	GF	GA	GD	Pts	Qualification
1	Rapid București (C, Q)	28	26	1	1	983	566	+417	79	Qualification to Promotion play-offs
2	Știința București (Q)	28	24	1	3	858	524	+334	73	Qualification to Promotion play-offs
3	Dinamo București	28	16	1	11	747	746	+1	49	
4	CSM București II	28	15	0	13	828	785	+43	45	Ineligible for promotion
5	Steaua București	28	13	1	14	826	785	+41	40	
6	SSP București	28	11	0	17	761	833	−72	33	
7	Danubius Călărași	28	4	0	24	618	922	−304	12	
8	Spartac București	28	1	0	27	571	1031	−460	3	

Updated to match(es) played on 18 April 2019. Source: Romanian Handball Federation (in Romanian)
Rules for classification: Rules for classification: 1) Points; 2) Goal difference; 3) Goals scored;
(C) Champions; (Q) Qualified for the phase indicated

=== Seria C ===
Pos	Team	Pld	W	D	L	GF	GA	GD	Pts	Qualification
1	Dacia Mioveni (C, Q)	24	21	1	2	733	420	+313	64	Qualification to Promotion play-offs
2	CSO Plopeni (Q)	24	17	2	5	728	541	+187	53	Qualification to Promotion play-offs
3	Argeș Pitești	24	17	0	7	725	546	+179	51	
4	Național Râmnicu Vâlcea	24	15	1	8	652	563	+89	46	
5	Odorheiu Secuiesc	24	6	0	18	565	731	−166	18	
6	Târgoviște	24	5	0	19	520	770	−250	15	
7	LPS Târgu Jiu	24	1	0	23	507	859	−352	3	

Updated to match(es) played on 18 April 2019. Source: Romanian Handball Federation (in Romanian)
Rules for classification: Rules for classification: 1) Points; 2) Goal difference; 3) Goals scored;
(C) Champions; (Q) Qualified for the phase indicated

=== Seria D ===
Pos	Team	Pld	W	D	L	GF	GA	GD	Pts	Qualification
1	Târgu Mureș (C, Q)	20	19	0	1	670	501	+169	57	Qualification to Promotion play-offs
2	Crișul Chișineu-Criș (Q)	20	12	2	6	626	589	+37	38	Qualification to Promotion play-offs
3	CSU Reșița	20	9	2	9	508	519	−11	29	
4	Minaur II Baia Mare	20	8	0	12	564	589	−25	24	Ineligible for promotion
5	Oradea	20	6	0	14	518	592	−74	18	
6	UV Timișoara	20	4	0	16	548	644	−96	12	

Updated to match(es) played on 20 April 2019. Source: Romanian Handball Federation (in Romanian)
Rules for classification: Rules for classification: 1) Points; 2) Goal difference; 3) Goals scored;
(C) Champions; (Q) Qualified for the phase indicated

== Promotion play-offs ==
=== Semi-final tournament ===
The first two eligible teams from each series of the regular season will compete in two main group which will be played in a neutral venue. The first two ranked teams from each group of the semi-final tournament will qualify for the Final Four. The semi-final tournament was played on neutral ground, in Făgăraș.

==== Group 1 ====
Pos	Team	Pld	W	D	L	GF	GA	GD	Pts	Qualification
1	Slobozia (Q)	3	3	0	0	91	72	+19	9	Qualification to Final Four
2	Dacia Mioveni (Q)	3	2	0	1	80	68	+12	6	Qualification to Final Four
3	Crișul Chișineu-Criș	3	1	0	2	74	96	−22	3	
4	Știința București	3	0	0	3	58	67	−9	0	

Source: Romanian Handball Federation (in Romanian)
Rules for classification: Rules for classification: 1) Points; 2) Goal difference; 3) Goals scored;
(Q) Qualified for the phase indicated

==== Group 2 ====
Pos	Team	Pld	W	D	L	GF	GA	GD	Pts	Qualification
1	Rapid București (Q)	3	3	0	0	86	63	+23	9	Qualification to Final Four
2	Târgu Mureș (Q)	3	2	0	1	82	82	0	6	Qualification to Final Four
3	CSO Plopeni	3	1	0	2	76	81	−5	3	
4	Neptun Constanța	3	0	0	3	72	90	−18	0	

Source: Romanian Handball Federation (in Romanian)
Rules for classification: Rules for classification: 1) Points; 2) Goal difference; 3) Goals scored;
(Q) Qualified for the phase indicated

=== Final Four ===
The Final Four was played on neutral ground, in Ploiești.

Semi-finals
1 Slobozia	24
2 Târgu Mureș	19
1 Rapid București	25
2 Dacia Mioveni	20

Final
Slobozia	26
Rapid București	29

Third place
Târgu Mureș	20
Dacia Mioveni	29

=== League table – positions 1–4 ===
	Team	Qualification or relegation
1	Rapid București (C, P)	Promotion to 2019–20 Liga Națională
2	Slobozia (P)	Promotion to 2019–20 Liga Națională
3	Dacia Mioveni (Q)	Qualification to Promotion play-offs
4	Târgu Mureș (Q)	Qualification to Promotion play-offs

== Promotion/relegation play-offs ==
The 3rd and 4th-placed teams of the Divizia A promotion tournament faced the 11th and 12th-placed teams of the Liga Națională. The first two places promoted to Liga Națională and the last two relegated to Divizia A. The play-offs were played on neutral ground, in Cisnădie.

Pos	Team	Pld	W	D	L	GF	GA	GD	Pts	Qualification
1	Universitatea Cluj (C, P)	3	2	1	0	82	68	+14	7	Promoted to Liga Națională
2	Slatina (P)	3	2	0	1	74	72	+2	6	Promoted to Liga Națională
3	Dacia Mioveni (R)	3	1	1	1	80	67	+13	4	Relegated to Divizia A
4	Târgu Mureș (R)	3	0	0	3	65	94	−29	0	Relegated to Divizia A

Updated to match(es) played on Ccomplete. Source: Romanian Handball Federation (in Romanian)
Rules for classification: Rules for classification: 1) Points; 2) Goal difference; 3) Goals scored;
(C) Champions; (P) Promoted; (R) Relegated
