= Željka Nikolić =

Serbian handball player (born 1991)

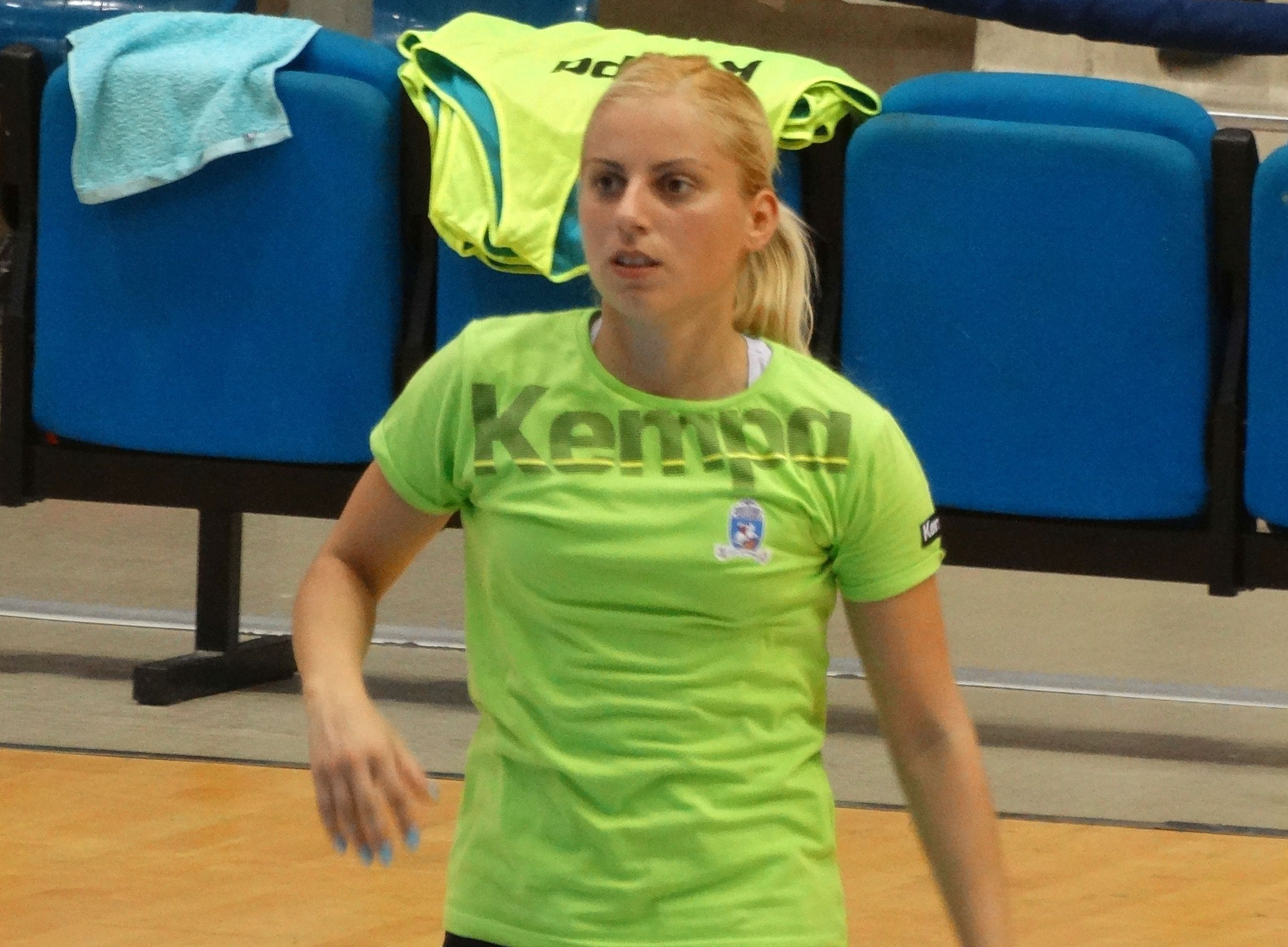

Personal information
- Nationality: Serbian
- Born: 12 July 1991 (age 35) Priboj, SR Serbia, SFR Yugoslavia
- Height: 1.69 m (5 ft 7 in)

Sport
- Sport: Handball
- Position: Right wing
- Current club: SCM Craiova
- Number: 14

Senior clubs
- Years: Team
- 2009–2010: Vrnjačka Banja
- 2010–2011: ŽRK Biseri
- 2012–2015: ŽRK Budućnost
- 2015–2016: Ringkøbing Håndbold
- 2016–2020: SCM Craiova
- 2020–2022: SCM Râmnicu Vâlcea
- 2022–2023: CS Gloria Bistrița-Năsăud (handball)
- 2023–2024: CSM București (women's handball)
- 2024–: SCM Craiova
National team
Years	Team	Apps	(Gls)
2016–	Serbia	54	(103)

Željka Nikolić (Serbian Cyrillic: Жељка Николић; born 12 July 1991) is a Serbian female handball player for Romanian club SCM Craiova and the Serbian national team.

She was given the award of Cetățean de onoare ("Honorary Citizen") of the city of Craiova in 2018.

== Honours ==
=== Club ===
- EHF Champions League:
  - Winner: 2015
- EHF Cup:
  - Winner: 2018

=== Individual ===
- Prosport Best Right Wing of the Romanian Liga Națională: 2018
