= Sonia Seraficeanu =

Romanian handball player (born 1997)

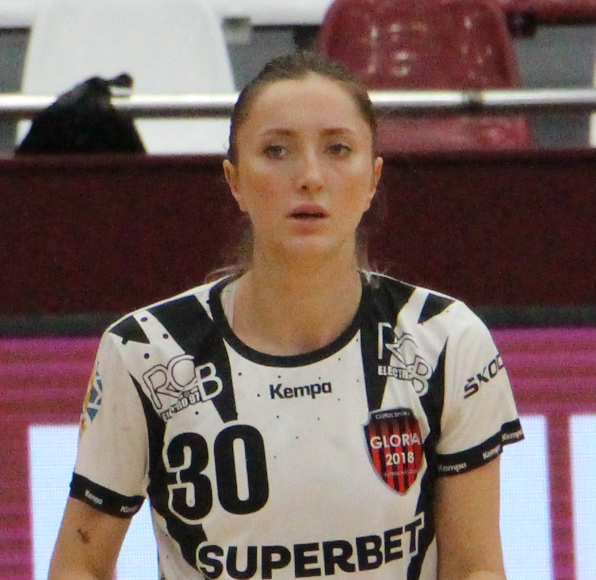

Personal information
- Full name: Sonia Mariana Seraficeanu
- Nationality: Romanian
- Born: 25 July 1997 (age 29) Hunedoara, Romania
- Height: 1.74 m (5 ft 9 in)

Sport
- Sport: Handball
- Position: Right wing
- Current club: Gloria Bistrița-Năsăud
- Number: 30

Youth career
- Years: Team
- –2014: CSȘ Hunedoara
- 2014–2015: CSȘ Mediaș

Senior clubs
- Years: Team
- 2014–2015: Mureșul Târgu Mureș
- 2015–2017: Cetate Deva
- 2017: Universitatea Cluj-Napoca
- 2017–2018: CSM Slatina
- 2018–2021: Minaur Baia Mare
- 2021–: Gloria 2018 Bistrița-Năsăud
National team
Years	Team	Apps	(Gls)
2019–	Romania	54	(114)
- Updated on 7 November 2025

Sonia Mariana Seraficeanu (born 25 July 1997) is a Romanian handballer who plays as a right wing for CS Gloria 2018 Bistrița-Năsăud and the Romanian national team.

== International honours ==
- Trofeul Carpaţi:
  - Second place: 2018
