= Raluca Băcăoanu =

Romanian handball player (born 1989)

Personal information
- Full name: Raluca Elena Băcăoanu
- Nationality: Romanian
- Born: 2 May 1989 (age 37) Constanța, Romania
- Height: 1.77 m (5 ft 10 in)

Sport
- Sport: Handball
- Position: Pivot
- Current club: Gloria Bistrița

Senior clubs
- Years: Team
- 2008–2016: Unirea Slobozia
- 2016–2017: CS Măgura Cisnădie
- 2017–2020: SCM Râmnicu Vâlcea
- 2020–2021: Gloria Bistrița
- 2021-2022: CS Măgura Cisnădie
- 2022-: SCM Râmnicu Vâlcea
National team
Years	Team	Apps	(Gls)
2017–	Romania	21	(14)

Raluca Elena Băcăoanu (born 2 May 1989) is a Romanian handballer for Gloria Bistrița and the Romanian national team.

== Achievements ==
- Liga Națională:
  - Winner: 2019
- Supercupa României:
  - Winner: 2018
