= Lorena Ostase =

Romanian handball player (born 1997)

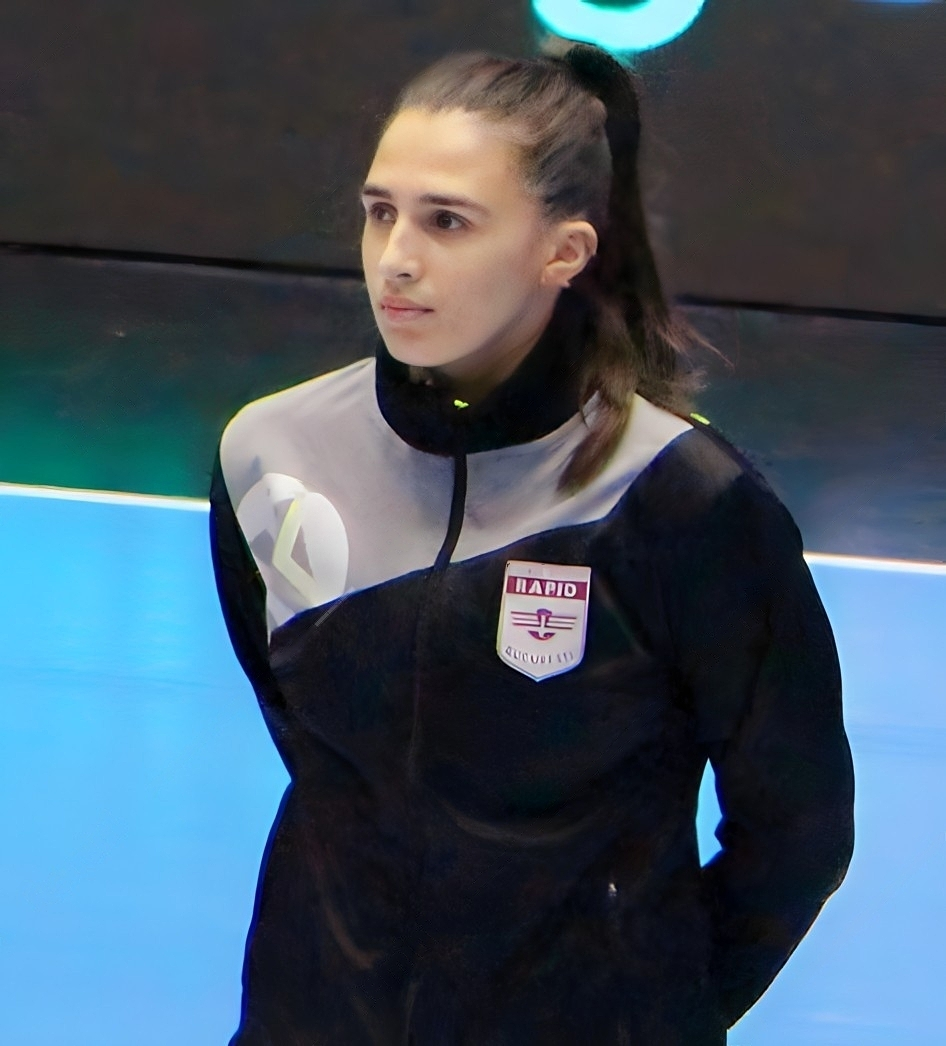

Personal information
- Full name: Lorena Gabriela Ostase
- Nationality: Romanian
- Born: 25 July 1997 (age 29) Vaslui, Romania
- Height: 1.79 m (5 ft 10 in)

Sport
- Sport: Handball
- Position: Pivot
- Current club: Gloria Bistrița-Năsăud
- Number: 37

Youth career
- Years: Team
- –2015: LPS Vaslui
- –2015: CNE Râmnicu Vâlcea

Senior clubs
- Years: Team
- 2015–2016: Unirea Slobozia
- 2016–2022: CSM Slatina
- 2022–2025: Rapid București
- 2025–: Gloria Bistrița-Năsăud
National team
Years	Team	Apps	(Gls)
2019-	Romania	53	(149)
Medal record
IHF Junior World Championship
Bronze medal – third place	2016 Russia
IHF Youth World Championship
Gold medal – first place	2014 Macedonia
- Updated on 7 November 2025

Lorena Gabriela Ostase (born 25 July 1997) is a Romanian handballer for Gloria Bistrița-Năsăud and the Romanian national team.

She represented Romania at the 2019 World Women's Handball Championship and at the 2021 World Women's Handball Championship.

== International honours ==
- IHF Youth World Championship:
  - Gold Medalist: 2014
- IHF Junior World Championship:
  - Bronze Medalist: 2016

== Awards and recognition ==
- All-Star Pivot of the IHF Youth World Championship: 2014
- Vaslui County Sportswoman of the Year Award: 2014
