= Zsanett Borbély =

Hungarian handball player (born 1978)

Personal information
- Full name: Zsanett Borbély
- Nationality: Hungarian
- Born: 9 January 1978 (age 48) Szeged, Hungary
- Height: 1.78 m (5 ft 10 in)

Sport
- Sport: Handball
- Position: Line Player
- Current club: CS Universitatea Reșița

Senior clubs
- Years: Team
- –2001: Vasas SC
- 2001–2002: Alcoa FKC
- 2002–2004: Dunaújváros
- 2004–2005: PTE-PEAC
- 2005–2007: Kiskunhalas NKSE
- 2007–2008: Hódmezővásárhelyi NKC
- 2008: HC Oţelul Galaţi
- 2009: CSM Deva
- 2009–2010: HCM Ştiinţa Baia Mare
- 2010–2015: CS Universitatea Reșița
National team
Years	Team	Apps	(Gls)
2006	Hungary	8	(10)

Zsanett Borbély (born 9 January 1978 in Szeged) is a former Hungarian handballer.

A former Hungarian international, she participated on the European Championship in 2006, finishing fifth.

== Achievements ==
- Nemzeti Bajnokság I:
  - Winner: 2003, 2004
- Magyar Kupa:
  - Winner: 2004
- EHF Champions League:
  - Semifinalist: 2004
- EHF Cup:
  - Finalist: 2003
  - Semifinalist: 2002
