= Iryna Shutska =

Ukrainian handball player

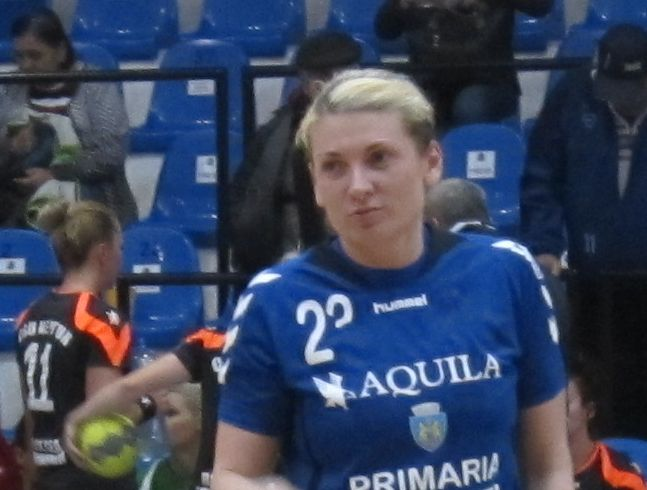
- Shutska in 2015

Personal information
- Full name: Iryna Shutska Sheyenko
- Nationality: Ukrainian
- Born: 5 March 1983 (age 43) Kirovohrad, Ukraine
- Height: 1.80 m (5 ft 11 in)

Sport
- Sport: Handball
- Position: Pivot
- Current club: HC Dunărea Brăila

Senior clubs
- Years: Team
- 2002–2010: HC Motor
- 2010–2011: HC Sparta
- 2011–2012: CSM Bacău 2010
- 2012–2013: HC Dunărea Brăila
- 2013–2014: CSM București
- 2014–2016: CSM Ploieşti
- 2016-2017: Dinamo București
- 2017-: HC Dunărea Brăila
National team
| Years | Team | Apps | (Gls) |
| – | Ukraine | 63 | (102) |

Iryna Shutska (born 5 March 1983), formerly known as Iryna Sheyenko, is a Ukrainian handballer playing for the Romanian club HC Dunărea Brăila and the Ukraine national team.
