= CSM Slatina =

CSM Slatina may refer to:

- CSM Slatina (football), a men's football club
- CSM Slatina (women's handball), a women's handball club
