= Mirela Nichita-Pașca =

Romanian handball player (born 1985)

Mirela Nichita-Paşca
Personal information
- Full name: Mirela-Mădălina Nichita-Paşca
- Nationality: Romanian
- Born: 26 September 1985 (age 41) Tulcea, Romania
- Height: 1.80 m (5 ft 11 in)

Sport
- Sport: Handball
- Position: Goalkeeper
- Current club: CSM Slatina
- Number: 1

Senior clubs
- Years: Team
- 2002–2012: HC Zalău
- 2012–2013: Dunărea Brăila
- 2013–2017: SCM Craiova
- 2017-2020: Măgura Cisnădie
- 2020-: CSM Slatina
National team
Years	Team	Apps	(Gls)
2011–	Romania	15	(1)

Mirela-Mădălina Nichita-Paşca (born 26 September 1985) is a Romanian female handballer who plays as a goalkeeper for Măgura Cisnădie.

== International honours ==
- EHF Cup:
  - Finalist: 2012
  - Semifinalist: 2013
