= Paraschiv =

Paraschiv is a Romanian surname. It may refer to:

- Amansio Paraschiv (born 1992), Romanian kickboxer
- Gabriel Paraschiv (born 1978), Romanian retired football player
- Magdalena Paraschiv (born 1982), Romanian handball player
- Sorin Paraschiv (born 1981), Romanian retired football player
- Vasile Paraschiv (1928–2011), Romanian social and political activist

As a given name, it may refer to:

- Paraschiv Vasilescu (1864–1925), Romanian general in World War I
