= MKS Lublin =

Polish women's handball club

PGE MKS EL-VOLT LUBLIN
- Founded: 1933; 93 years ago
- Arena: Globus Hall
- Capacity: 4,119
- President: Tomasz Lewtak
- Head coach: Paweł Tetelewski
- League: ORLEN SUPERLIGA KOBIET
- 2025-26: 2nd
- Club colours
Home	Away

PGE MKS EL-VOLT LUBLIN is a women's handball club from Lublin, Poland, that plays in the Superliga. They are among the most successful Polish teams, both domestically and abroad, and has won the most Polish Championships (22).

== Venue ==
PGE MKS Lublin plays its home matches at the Hala Globus im. Tomasza Wójtowicza (Globus Arena), which is the largest indoor arena in Lublin.

The arena was built between 1999 and 2006, with the official opening taking place on 15 October 2006. Since 2021, it has been named after the legendary Polish volleyball player Tomasz Wójtowicz. For handball matches, the venue has a seating capacity of approximately 4,119 spectators. It is a multi-purpose facility managed by MOSiR "Bystrzyca" and meets international standards for European club competitions.

=== Location ===
- Address: ul. Kazimierza Wielkiego 8, 20-611 Lublin, Poland.

== Titles ==
- Polish Ekstraklasa Women's Handball League
  - Winner: (22) 1995, 1996, 1997, 1998, 1999, 2000, 2001, 2002, 2003, 2005, 2006, 2007, 2008, 2009, 2010, 2013, 2014, 2015, 2016, 2018, 2019, 2020
  - Second-place: (4): 2004, 2011, 2022, 2023
  - Third-place: (3) : 2012, 2021, 2024
- Polish Handball Cup:
  - Winner: (11) 1996, 1997, 1998, 2000, 2001, 2002, 2006, 2007, 2010, 2012, 2018
  - Finalist: (3) 2008, 2013, 2021

=== International titles ===
- EHF Cup:
  - Winner: 2001
- EHF Challenge Cup
  - Winner: 2018

== Kits ==
Kits
Home	Away

== European record ==
Season	Competition	Round	Club	1st leg	2nd leg	Aggregate
2016–17	EHF Champions League	Q1	(Italy) Indeco Conversano	27–28		3rd place
2016–17	EHF Champions League	Q1	(Slovakia) Michalovce	33–21		3rd place
2016–17	EHF Cup	R3	(Denmark) Randers	27–28	25–25	52–53
2017–18	EHF Challenge Cup	R3	(North Macedonia) Kumanovo	54–13	41–18	95–31
2017–18	EHF Challenge Cup	1/8	(Portugal) Barros	36–12	37–12	73–24
2017–18	EHF Challenge Cup	1/4	(Spain) Málaga	18–19	27–20	45–39
2017–18	EHF Challenge Cup	1/2	(Turkey) Ardeşen	23–28	36–20	59–48
2017–18	EHF Challenge Cup	Final	(Spain) Gran Canaria	22–22	27–23	49–45

== Team ==
=== Season 2026/2027 ===
Squad for the 2026–27 season

Goalkeepers

* 1  Caroline Aparecida Nogueira Martins
* 12  Nina Smelcerz
* 26  Paulina Wdowiak

Left wingers

* 96  Dagmara Nocuń
* 2  Sanja Radosavljević
* 4  Julia Dziuba

Right wingers

* 21  Daria Szynkaruk
* 22  Emilia Kowalik

Line players

* 6  Joanna Andruszak
* 13  Sylwia Matuszczyk
* 36  Natalia Pankowska
* 10  Julia Owczaruk

Left backs

* 42  Jhennifer Lopes
* 66  Aleksandra Rosiak

Centre backs

* 28  Sarah Dalsgaard Paulsen
* 19  Patricia Lima
* 14  Daria Przywara

Right backs

* 24  María Prieto O'Mullony
* 25  Oliwia Domagalska

=== Season 2025/2026 ===
Squad for the 2025–26 season

Goalkeepers

* 1  Caroline Martins
* 12  Weronika Gawlik
* 26  Paulina Wdowiak

Left wingers

* 3  Oktawia Fedeńczak
* 2  Sanja Radosavljević
* 5  Wiktoria Gliwińska
* 4  Julia Dziuba

Right wingers

* 21  Daria Szynkaruk
* 71  Adrianna Górna

Line players

*6  Joanna Andruszak
* 13  Sylwia Matuszczyk
* 10  Julia Owczaruk

Left backs

* 17  Magda Więckowska
* 8  Dominika Więckowska
* 66  Aleksandra Rosiak

Centre backs

* 9  Aleksandra Tomczyk
* 19  Patricia Lima
* 14  Daria Przywara

Right backs

* 24  María Prieto O'Mullony
* 43  Szimonetta Planéta

=== Staff members ===
Staff for the 2025-26 season.

- (Poland) Head Coach: Paweł Tetelewski
- (Poland) Assistant Coach: Beata Aleksandrowicz
- (Poland) Team Leader: Radoslaw Kozaczuk
- (Poland) Physiotherapist: Wojciech Pogorzelec
- (Poland) Physiotherapist: Szymon Owoc
- (Poland) Physical coach: Konrad Szczukocki
- (Poland) Goalkeeper coach: Tomasz Błaszkiewicz

=== Transfers ===
Transfers for the 2026-27 season

Joining

- (Denmark) Sarah Paulsen (CB) (from (Denmark) SønderjyskE Damehåndbold)
- (Brazil) Jhennifer Lopes (LB) (from (France) Saint-Amand Handball)
- (Poland) Emilia Kowalik (RW) (from (Slovakia) IUVENTA Michalovce)
- (Poland) Oliwia Domagalska (RB) (from (Poland) MKS Piotrcovia Piotrków Trybunalski)
- (Poland) Natalia Pankowska (LP) (from (Poland) MKS Piotrcovia Piotrków Trybunalski)
- (Poland) Nina Smelcerz (GK) (from (Poland) Korona Handball Kielce)
- (Poland) Dagmara Nocuń (LW) (from (Montenegro) ZRK Buducnost Podgorica)

Leaving

- (Poland) Julia Pietras (LW) (to (Poland) MKS Zagłębie Lubin) - (With immediate effect 21st January 2026)
- (Poland) Dominika Wieckowska (LB) (to (Romania) SCM Craiova)
- (Poland) Adrianna Górna (RW) (to (Romania) CSM Slatina)
- (Hungary) Szimonetta Planeta (RB) (to Unknown)
- (Poland) Weronika Gawlik (GK) (end of career)
- (Poland) Wiktoria Gliwińska (LW) (to Unknown)
- (Poland) Magda Więckowska (LB) (end of career?)
- (Poland) Aleksandra Tomczyk (CB) (to Unknown)
- (Poland) Oktawia Fedeńczak (LW) (end of career)

=== Transfers ===
Transfers for the 2025-26 season

Joining

- (Spain) María Prieto O'Mullony (RB) (from (Spain) Caja Rural Aula Valladolid)
- (Portugal) Patrícia Lima (CB) (from (Spain) CBF Málaga Costa del Sol)
- (Brazil) Caroline Martins (GK) (from (Hungary) Mosonmagyaróvári KC SE)
- (Poland) Daria Przywara (CB) (from (Poland) MKS Zagłębie Lubin)
- (Poland) Adrianna Górna (RW) (from (Poland) MKS Zagłębie Lubin
- (Poland) Wiktoria Gliwińska (LW) (from (Poland) MKS Kalisz
- (Serbia) Sanja Radosavljević (LW) (from (Sweden) Kristianstad Handboll

Leaving

- (Poland) Magda Balsam (RW) (to (Romania) CSM Slatina
- (Croatia) Stella Posavec (CB) (to (Croatia) RK Lokomotiva Zagreb
- (Austria) Antonija Mamić (GK) (to (Croatia) RK Lokomotiva Zagreb
- (Netherlands) Anouk Nieuwenweg (RB) (to (Spain) Club Balonman Atletico Guardes
- (Poland) Aleksandra Olek (LP) (to (Romania) HC Dunărea Brăila
- (Poland) Michalina Pastuszka (CB) ( end of career

=== Notable players ===
- (Brazil) Jessica Quintino
- (Montenegro) Ivana Božović
- (Croatia) Valentina Blažević
- (Bulgaria) Ekaterina Dzhukeva
- (Poland) Iwona Niedźwiedź
- (Poland) Anna Wysokińska
- (Poland) Joanna Drabik
- (Poland) Agnieszka Kocela
- (Poland) Dagmara Nocuń
- (Poland) Kristina Repelewska
- (Poland) Małgorzata Stasiak
- (Poland) Joanna Szarawaga
- (Poland) Alina Wojtas
- (Poland) Marta Gega
- (Poland) Aleksandra Baranowska
- (Poland) Malgorzata Majerek
- (Poland) Magdalena Chemicz
- (Poland) Agnieszka Wolska
- (Poland) Dagmara Kowalska
- (Poland) Izabela Puchacz
