= Rebeca Necula =

Romanian handball player (born 2003)

Personal information
- Full name: Rebeca Ioana Necula
- Nationality: Romanian
- Born: 17 May 2003 (age 23) Brașov, Romania
- Height: 1.68 m (5 ft 6 in)

Sport
- Sport: Handball
- Position: Centre Back
- Current club: SCM Râmnicu Vâlcea

Youth career
- Years: Team
- –2019: Corona Brașov

Senior clubs
- Years: Team
- 2019–2021: Universitatea Cluj-Napoca
- 2021–2023: CSM Slatina
- 2023–: SCM Râmnicu Vâlcea
National team
Years	Team	Apps	(Gls)
2023–	Romania	12	(11)
- Updated on 7 November 2025

Rebeca Ioana Necula (born 17 May 2003) is a Romanian professional handballer who plays as a centre back for Liga Națională club SCM Râmnicu Vâlcea.
