= Laura Popa =

Romanian handball player (born 1994)

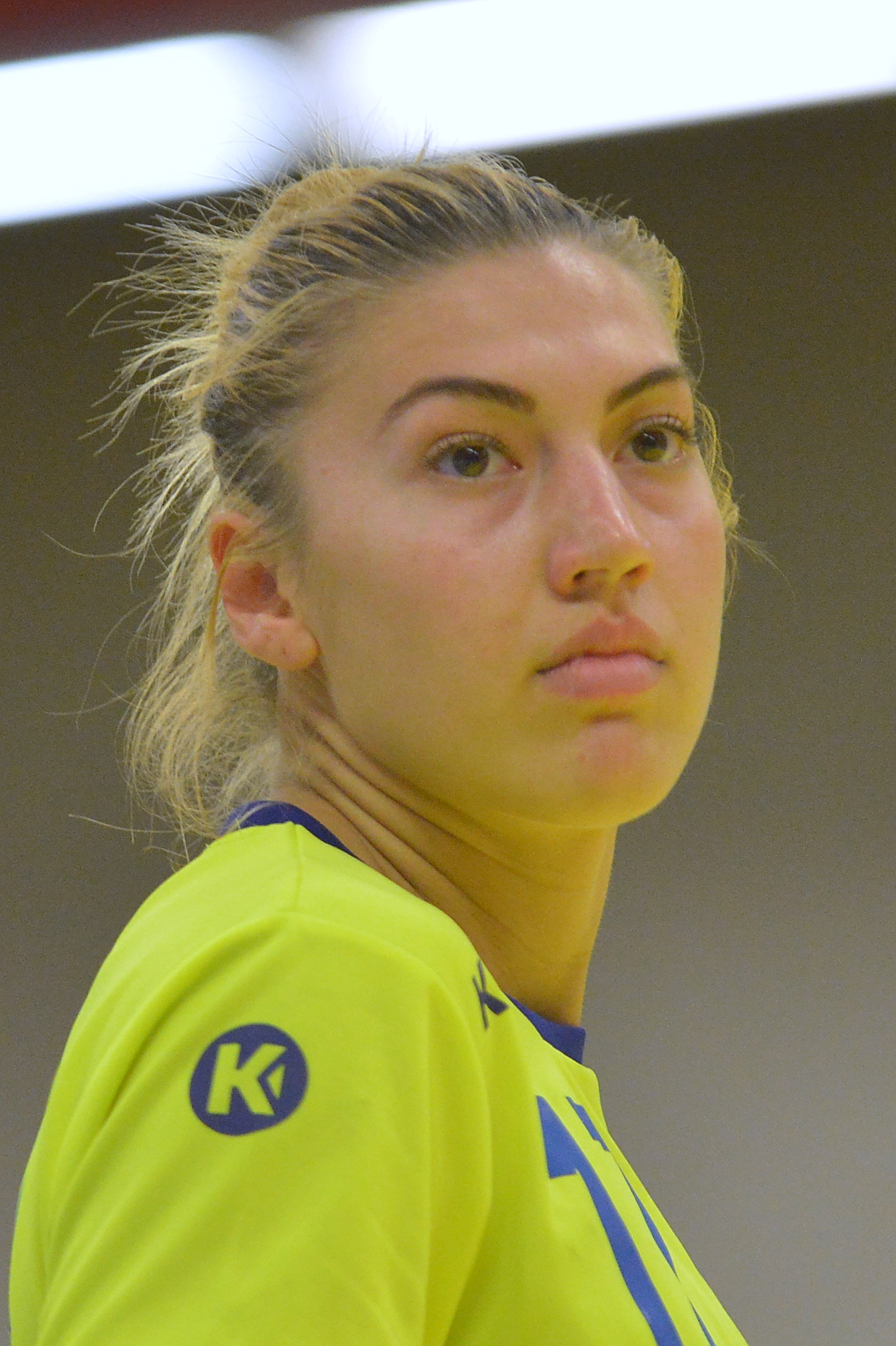
- Popa in 2017

Personal information
- Full name: Laura Petruța Popa
- Nationality: Romanian
- Born: 29 June 1994 (age 32) Slatina, Romania
- Height: 1.81 m (5 ft 11 in)

Sport
- Sport: Handball
- Position: Right back
- Current club: Rapid București
- Number: 29

Youth career
- Years: Team
- –: LPS Slatina
- –2013: CNOE Râmnicu Vâlcea

Senior clubs
- Years: Team
- 2013–2017: Universitatea Cluj-Napoca
- 2017: Dinamo București
- 2017–2018: Corona Brașov
- 2018–2019: Universitatea Cluj-Napoca
- 2019–2020: Mosonmagyaróvári KC SE
- 2020–: Rapid București
National team
Years	Team	Apps	(Gls)
2015–	Romania	42	(26)
Medal record
World University Championship
Silver medal – second place	2016 Spain

Laura Petruța Popa (born 29 June 1994) is a Romanian handballer who plays as a right back for Rapid București and the Romanian national team.

== International honours ==
- Youth World Championship:
  - Fourth place: 2012
- World University Championship:
  - Silver Medalist: 2016
