= Laura Pristăviță =

Romanian handball player (born 1989)

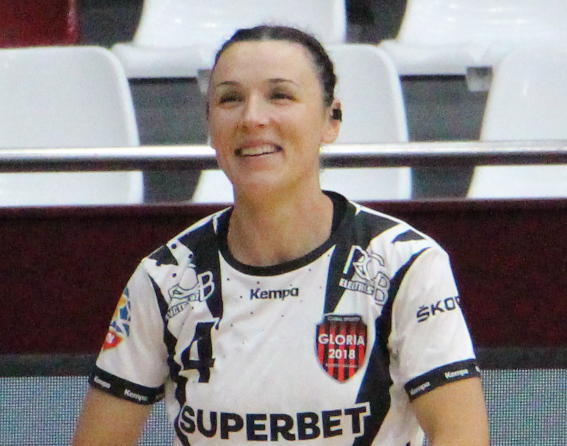

Personal information
- Full name: Ioana Laura Pristăviță
- Nationality: Romanian
- Born: 20 July 1989 (age 37) Bistrița, Romania
- Height: 1.75 m (5 ft 9 in)

Sport
- Sport: Handball
- Position: Centre back
- Current club: Gloria Bistrița
- Number: 4

Youth career
- Years: Team
- –2008: LPS Bistrița

Senior clubs
- Years: Team
- 2008–2012: Universitatea Cluj-Napoca
- 2012–2016: HCM Baia Mare
- 2016–: Gloria Bistrița
National team
Years	Team	Apps	(Gls)
2012–	Romania	36	(24)

Ioana Laura Pristăviță (née Oltean; born 20 July 1989) is a Romanian female handballer who plays for Gloria Bistrița and the Romanian national team.

She was provisionally selected for the 2014 European Women's Handball Championship but she didn't make the squad in the end because of an injury.

== Achievements ==
- Liga Naţională:
  - Winner: 2014
  - Silver Medalist: 2010, 2011, 2012, 2013, 2015
  - Bronze Medalist: 2010, 2011, 2012, 2013, 2019
- Cupa României:
  - Winner: 2013, 2014, 2015
- Supercupa României:
  - Winner: 2013, 2014
- European Junior Handball Championship:
  - Bronze Medalist: 2007
