= Ionica Munteanu =

Romanian handball player (born 1979)

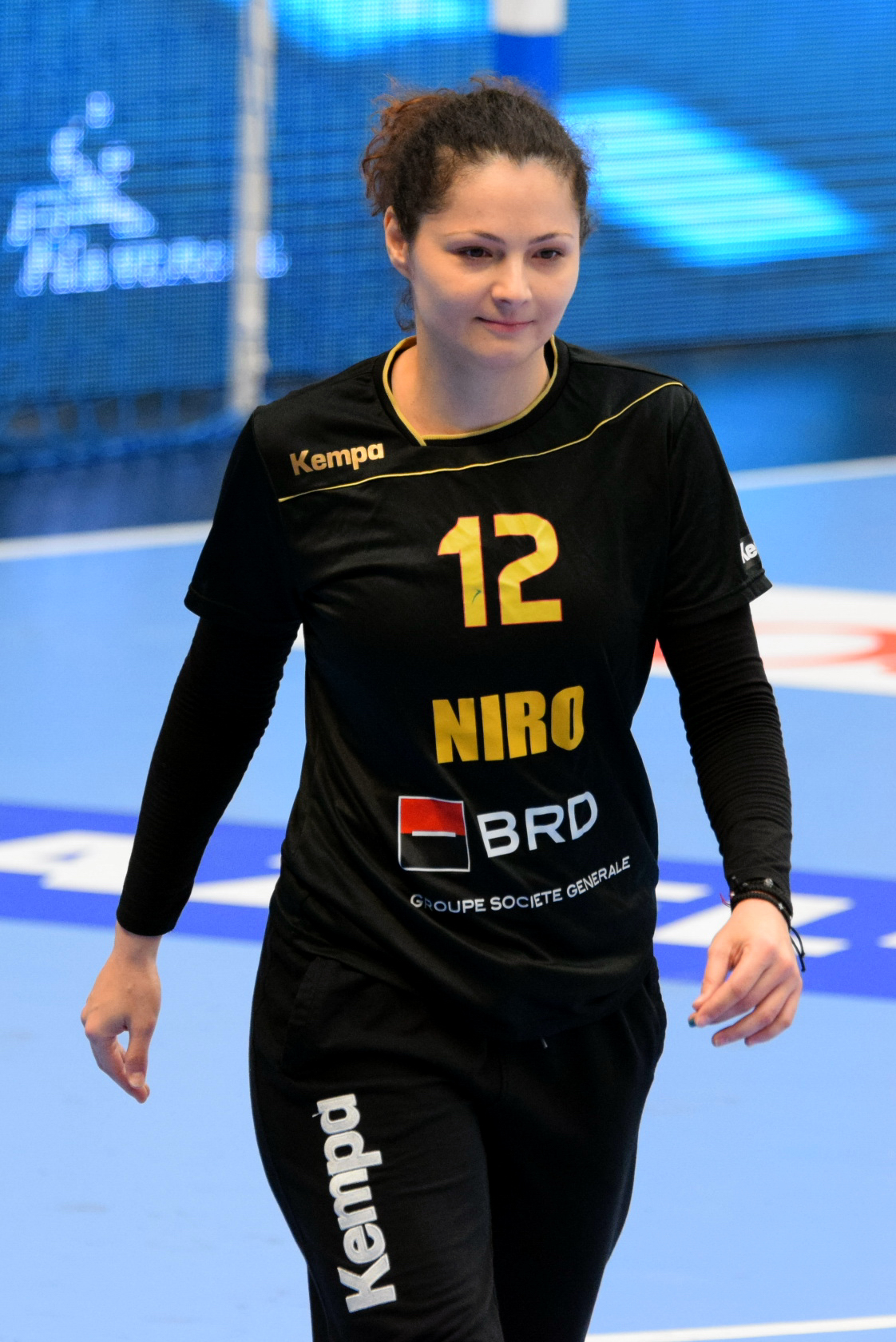
- Munteanu in 2015

Personal information
- Nationality: Romanian
- Born: 7 January 1979 (age 47) Bucharest, Romania
- Height: 1.75 m (5 ft 9 in)

Sport
- Sport: Handball
- Position: Goalkeeper

Senior clubs
- Years: Team
- 1998–2002: Uni Ursus Cluj-Napoca
- 2002–2004: Le Havre ACH
- 2004: Randers HK
- 2005: HC Leipzig
- 2005–2009: Rulmentul Brașov
- 2010: Mios Biganos
- 2011: HC Oțelul Galați
- 2012: "U" Jolidon Cluj-Napoca
- 2012–2015: SCM Craiova
- 2015–2016: HCM Baia Mare
- 2016–2019: Universitatea Cluj-Napoca
National team
- Years: Team
- 2004–: Romania
Medal record
Youth World Championship
Gold medal – first place	1999 China	Team
Youth European Championship
Gold medal – first place	1998 Slovakia	Team
World Championship
Bronze medal – third place	2015 Denmark
World University Championship
Gold medal – first place	2002 Spain	Team
Silver medal – second place	2000 France	Team

Ionica Munteanu (born 7 January 1979) is a Romanian female handballer.

== International honours ==
- EHF Cup Winners' Cup:
  - Finalist: 2008
- EHF Cup:
  - Semifinalist: 2005, 2009
- EHF Challenge Cup:
  - Winner: 2006

== Individual awards ==
- Championnat de France Best Goalkeeper: 2004
