= Mădălina Ion =

Romanian handball player (born 1996)

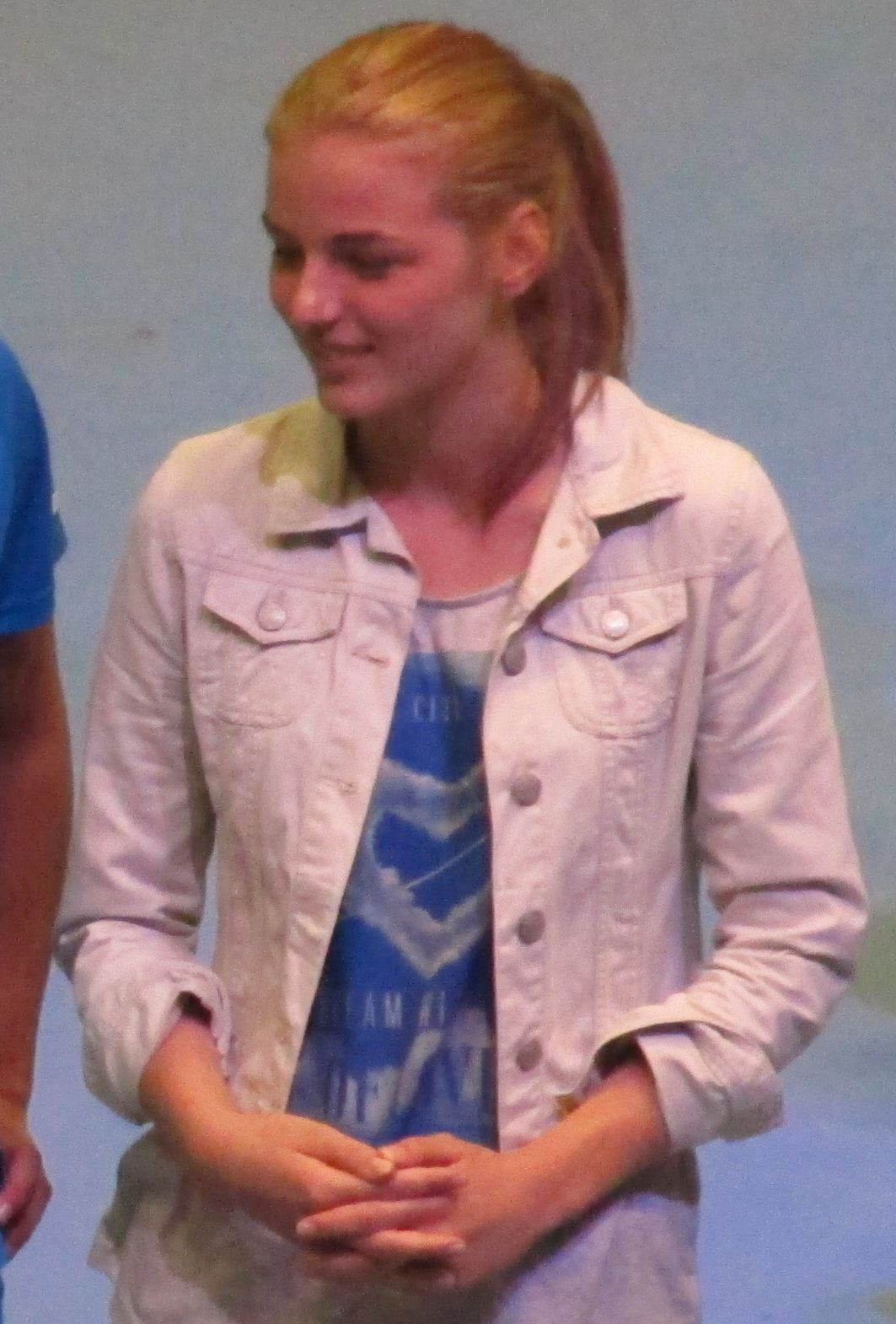

Personal information
- Nationality: Romanian
- Born: 23 February 1996 (age 30) Bucharest, Romania
- Height: 1.80 m (5 ft 11 in)

Sport
- Sport: Handball
- Position: Goalkeeper
- Current club: Universitatea Cluj-Napoca

Youth career
- Years: Team
- –2014: Rapid București

Senior clubs
- Years: Team
- 2014–2016: CSM București II
- 2016–2018: → HCM Slobozia (loan)
- 2018–2020: CSM București
- 2020–: Universitatea Cluj-Napoca
Medal record
IHF Junior World Championship
Bronze medal – third place	2016 Russia
IHF Youth World Championship
Gold medal – first place	2014 Macedonia

Mădălina Ion (born 23 February 1996) is a Romanian handball player who plays for Universitatea Cluj-Napoca.

== Achievements ==
- Cupa României:
  - Winner: 2019
- Liga Națională:
  - Silver Medalist: 2019
- Supercupa României:
  - Finalist: 2018
- Supercupa României:
  - Finalist: 2018
- IHF Junior World Championship:
  - Bronze Medalist: 2016
- IHF Youth World Championship:
  - Gold Medalist: 2014
