= CSU UV Timișoara (women's handball) =

Romanian women's handball team

Clubul Sportiv Universitar Universitatea de Vest Timișoara
- Full name: CSU UV Timișoara
- Short name: CSU UVT
- Founded: 1949; 76 years ago
- Arena: Constantin Jude Sports Hall
- League: Divizia A
- Club colours

CSU UV Timișoara, formerly known as Știința Timișoara or Universitatea Timișoara, is a women's handball team based in Timișoara, Romania that competes in the Divizia A.

Location of CSU UV Timișoara

== Honours ==
=== Domestic competitions ===
- Liga Națională
  - Winners (10): 1964, 1966, 1968, 1969, 1970, 1972, 1975, 1976, 1977, 1978
  - Second place: 1961, 1963, 1965, 1967, 1971, 1973, 1974
  - Third place: 1960

=== European competitions ===
- European Champions Cup:
  - Finalists: 1973
  - Third place: 1967

== Former players ==
- (Romania) Cristina Petrovici
- (Romania) Doina Petruța Cojocaru
- (Romania) Elisabeta Ionescu
- (Romania) Edeltraut Franz-Sauer
- (Romania) Gherlinde Reip-Oprea
- (Romania) Nadire Ibadula-Luțaș
- (Romania) Irina Günther
- (Romania) Hilda Hrivnak
- (Romania) Terezia Popa
- (Romania) Lidia Stan
- (Romania) Niculina Iordache

== Former coaches ==
- (Romania) Constantin Lache
- (Romania) Constantin Jude
- (Romania) Victor Chița
- (Romania) Gabriel Zugrăvescu
- (Romania) Ion Bota

== See also ==
- Politehnica Timișoara
