= Diana Lazăr =

Romanian handball player (born 1991)

Personal information
- Full name: Diana Alina Lazăr
- Nationality: Romanian
- Born: 24 August 1991 (age 35) Turnu Severin, Romania
- Height: 1.78 m (5 ft 10 in)

Sport
- Sport: Handball
- Position: Left Back
- Current club: CS Universitatea Cluj-Napoca

Youth career
- Years: Team
- –: CSȘ Turnu Severin
- –2010: CSȘ 2 Baia Mare

Senior clubs
- Years: Team
- 2010–2014: HCM Baia Mare
- 2010–2014: HCM II Baia Mare
- 2014–2016: HC Zalău
- 2016–: CS Universitatea Cluj-Napoca
National team
- Years: Team
- 2013–: Romania

Diana Alina Lazăr (née Puiu; born 24 August 1991 in Drobeta-Turnu Severin) is a Romanian handballer who plays for CS Universitatea Cluj-Napoca.

== Achievements ==
- Liga Naţională:
  - Gold Medalist: 2014
  - Silver Medalist: 2013
- Cupa României:
  - Winner: 2013, 2014
- Supercupa României:
  - Winner: 2013
