= Ana Maria Iuganu =

Romanian handball player (born 1990)

Personal information
- Nationality: Romanian
- Born: 25 February 1990 (age 36) Roman, Romania
- Height: 1.75 m (5 ft 9 in)

Sport
- Sport: Handball
- Position: Left wing
- Current club: Gloria Buzău
- Number: 77

Youth career
- Years: Team
- –: LPS Roman
- –: CNOE Râmnicu Vâlcea

Senior clubs
- Years: Team
- –2012: Universitatea Suceava
- 2013–2018: CSM Roman
- 2018–2019: SCM Râmnicu Vâlcea
- 2019–2021: Gloria Buzău
- 2021-2022: CS Gloria Bistrița-Năsăud
- 2022–2024: Gloria Buzău
National team
Years	Team	Apps	(Gls)
2012–2022	Romania	38	(41)

Ana Maria Iuganu (born 25 February 1990) is a retired Romanian handballer who plays for Gloria Buzău and the Romanian national team.

== Achievements ==
- Liga Națională:
  - Winner: 2019
- Supercupa României:
  - Winner: 2018
  - Silver Medalist: 2014, 2016
- Cupa României:
  - Finalist: 2014, 2016, 2019
