= Daciana Hosu =

Romanian handball player (born 1998)

- Hosu with Gloria Bistrița-Năsăud in 2026

Personal information
- Nationality: Romanian
- Born: 16 January 1998 (age 28) Bistrița, Romania
- Height: 1.82 m (6 ft 0 in)

Sport
- Sport: Handball
- Position: Goalkeeper
- Current club: Gloria Bistrița-Năsăud
- Number: 1

Youth career
- Years: Team
- –2014: LPS Bistrița
- 2014–2015: Corona Brașov

Senior clubs
- Years: Team
- 2015–2020: Corona Brașov
- 2020–2024: SCM Râmnicu Vâlcea
- 2024–2026: CSM București
- 2026–: Gloria Bistrița-Năsăud
National team
Years	Team	Apps	(Gls)
2014–2017	Romania U17/U18	44	(0)
2017–2018	Romania U19/U20	70	(0)
2019–	Romania	29	(0)
- Updated on 11 December 2023

Daciana Hosu (born 16 January 1998) is a Romanian handball player who plays as a goalkeeper for Gloria Bistrița-Năsăud. She has also represented the Romanian national team.

== Career ==
=== Early years ===
Born in Bistrița, Hosu began playing handball in 2008 at CS Handsport Bistrița, where she stayed until 2012, before moving to the city's sports high school (LPS Bistrița). In 2014 she was brought by coach Mariana Târcă to the junior team of Corona Brașov.

=== Corona Brașov (2015–2020) ===
Hosu made her senior debut for Corona Brașov in 2015 and played with the club in the EHF Cup in the 2015–16, 2016–17 and 2019–20 seasons. In 2016 she reached the semi-finals of the EHF Cup with Corona.

=== SCM Râmnicu Vâlcea (2020–2024) ===
On 8 October 2020, SCM Râmnicu Vâlcea announced the signing of Hosu. With Vâlcea she played in the EHF Champions League in 2020–21 and in the EHF European League in 2021–22 and 2022–23.

=== CSM București (2024–2026) ===
In 2023, Romanian champions CSM București announced that Hosu would join the club from the following summer. She played for CSM in the EHF Champions League in the 2024–25 and 2025–26 seasons.

=== Gloria Bistrița-Năsăud (2026–present) ===
In December 2025, Gloria Bistrița-Năsăud announced the signing of Hosu from the 2026–27 season, on a contract running until 2028. She described the move as a return home, to the city where she was born and where her career began. The club made her return official in July 2026, eighteen years after she first played in goal in Bistrița.

== International career ==
As a junior, Hosu represented Romania at the 2015 European Youth Olympic Festival and at the 2015 Women's U-17 European Championship, where Romania finished fourth. The same year she won gold at the Balkan Youth Championship. She later played at the 2016 Youth World Championship in Slovakia and at the 2018 Junior World Championship in Hungary.

She made her debut for the senior national team in 2019 and was included in Romania's squad for the 2023 World Women's Handball Championship; by then she had earned 29 senior caps, after 44 for the youth team and 70 for the junior team.

== Honours ==
Club

- EHF Cup:
  - Semi-finalist: 2016 (Corona Brașov)
- EHF European League:
  - Quarter-finalist: 2022, 2023 (SCM Râmnicu Vâlcea)
- Liga Națională:
  - (bronze) : 2021, 2022 (SCM Râmnicu Vâlcea)
- Cupa României:
  - Finalist: 2022 (SCM Râmnicu Vâlcea)

International

- European U-17 Championship:
  - Fourth place: 2015
- Balkan Youth Championship:
  - (gold) : 2015
