= Constantin Jude =

Romanian handball coach (1934-2005)

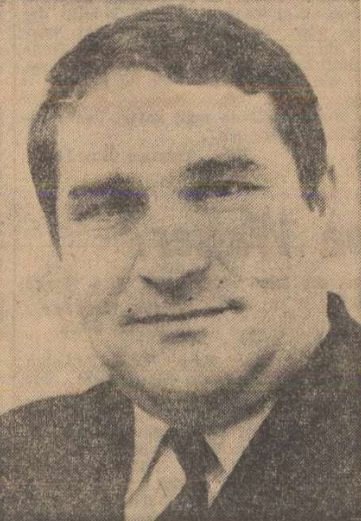

Personal information
- Nationality: Romanian

Sport
- Sport: Handball

Senior clubs
- Years: Team
- 1952–1953: Progresul Periam (men's)
- 1953–1961: Știința Timișoara (men's)
- 1961–1964: Politehnica Timișoara (men's)

Teams managed
- 1959–1961: Știința Timișoara (women's)
- 1961–1990: Politehnica Timișoara (men's)
- 1995–1997: Politehnica Timișoara (men's)
- 1998–1999: Constructorul Oradea (men's)

'Constantin Jude (1934 – 3 June 2005) was a Romanian professional handball player and manager. He is the longest-tenured coach in the history of Politehnica Timișoara (1961–1990, 1995–1997).

Other honours followed his death: he is the namesake of the multi-purpose, 2,200-seat Constantin Jude Sports Hall in Timișoara.

== Achievements ==
=== Player ===
Știința Timișoara (men's)

- Liga Națională:
  - Winner: 1956

=== Manager ===
Știința Timișoara (women's)

- Liga Națională:
  - Silver Medalist: 1961
  - Bronze Medalist: 1960

Politehnica Timișoara (men's)

- Liga Națională:
  - Silver Medalist: 1979
- Cupa României:
  - Winner: 1986
  - Finalist: 198*, 198*
