= Dana Abed Kader =

Romanian-Syrian handball player (born 1996)

Personal information
- Nationality: Romanian
- Born: 21 June 1996 (age 30) Raqqa, Syria
- Height: 1.73 m (5 ft 8 in)

Sport
- Sport: Handball
- Position: Centre back
- Current club: Măgura Cisnădie

Youth career
- Years: Team
- –: ACS Școala 181 București

Senior clubs
- Years: Team
- 2015–2017: Cetate Devatrans Deva
- 2017-2020: HC Zalău
- 2020-: Măgura Cisnădie
Medal record
Representing Romania
IHF Youth World Championship
Gold medal – first place	2014 Macedonia	Team

Dana Abed Kader (born 21 June 1996) is a Romanian handball player for Măgura Cisnădie. She plays mainly as a centre back but can also play as a pivot or left wing.

== Personal life ==
Dana was born in Raqqa to a Syrian father and a Romanian mother. She lives with her sister, mother and grandmother in Bucharest. Her sister, Sara, is also a handballer.

== Achievements ==
- IHF Youth World Championship:
  - Gold Medalist: 2014
