= Kristina Repelewska =

Polish handball player (born 1981)

Personal information
- Nationality: Polish
- Born: 7 January 1981 (age 45) Minsk, Belarus
- Height: 1.76 m (5 ft 9 in)

Sport
- Sport: Handball
- Position: Centre back
- Current club: MKS Lublin
- Number: 17
National team
Years	Team	Apps	(Gls)
–	Poland	8	(7)

Kristina Repelewska (born 7 January 1981) is a Polish handball player. She plays for the club MKS Lublin, and is member of the Polish national team. She competed at the 2015 World Women's Handball Championship in Denmark.
