= Mariana Costa =

Brazilian handball player (born 1992)

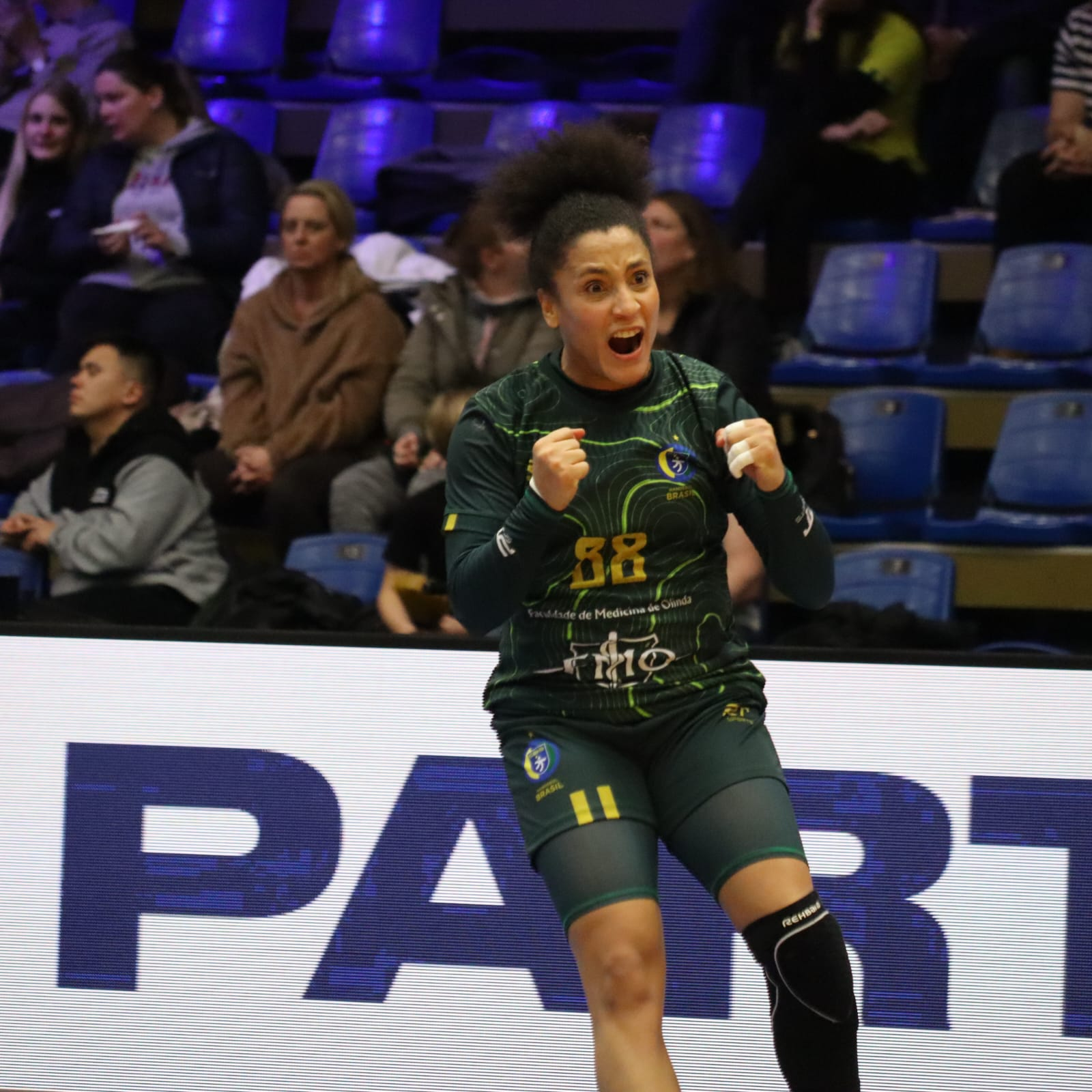

Personal information
- Born: 14 October 1992 (age 34) São Paulo, Brazil
- Height: 1.66 m (5 ft 5 in)

Sport
- Sport: Handball
- Position: Right wing
- Current club: Debreceni VSC
- Number: 88

Senior clubs
- Years: Team
- –2013: CPH Handebol
- 2013–2014: Vendsyssel Håndbold
- 2014–2015: Hypo Niederösterreich
- 2015–2017: Nykøbing FH
- 2017–2018: CS Măgura Cisnădie
- 2018–2019: SCM Craiova
- 2019–2021: Gloria Bistrița
- 2021–2023: Debreceni VSC
National team
Years	Team	Apps	(Gls)
–	Brazil	63	(177)
Medal record
World Championship
Gold medal – first place	2013 Serbia
Pan American Games
Gold medal – first place	2019 Lima	Team
Gold medal – first place	2023 Santiago	Team
Pan American Championship
Gold medal – first place	2017 Argentina
South and Central American Championship
Gold medal – first place	2018 Brazil
Gold medal – first place	2022 Argentina
South American Games
Gold medal – first place	2018 Cochabamba	Team

Mariana Costa (born 14 October 1992) is a Brazilian handballer for the Brazilian national team. In 2013 she won the World Championship; the first time ever for Brazil and South America.

== Career ==
Until 2013 Costa played for the Brazilian club CPH Handebol. In January 2013 she signed for Danish club Vendsyssel Håndbold. Here she played for a season before joining austrian Hypo Niederösterreich. Here she won the Austrian Championship and cup in her only season at the club. She then returned to Denmark and joined Nykøbing Falster Håndboldklub. She signed a contract until 2018, but the contract was cancelled already in May 2017. With NFH she won the Danish championship, the first in club history.

Her next club was Romanian CS Măgura Cisnădie, where she signed a contract from 2017 to 2019. But once again the contract was cancelled prematurely in 2018. She then signed for SCM Craiova, followed by Gloria Bistrița.

From 2021 she played for Hungarian Debreceni VSC.

== Achievements ==
- Romanian League:
  - Bronze Medalist: 2018
- Danish League:
  - Winner: 2017
- Austrian League:
  - Winner: 2015
- Austrian Cup:
  - Winner: 2015
- EHF Cup:
  - Semifinalist: 2017
- World Championship:
  - Winner: 2013
- Pan American Championship:
  - Winner: 2017

== Individual awards ==
- Women's International Tournament of Spain Top Scorer: 2018
- South and Central American Women's Handball Championship Top Scorer: 2018
