= 2018 Women's International Tournament of Spain =

Tournament details
- Host country: Spain
- Venue(s): 1 (in 1 host city)
- Dates: 23–25 November
- Teams: 4 (from 2 confederations)

Final positions
- Champions: Spain
- Runner-up: Brazil
- Third place: Germany
- Fourth place: Poland

Tournament statistics
- Matches played: 6
- Goals scored: 289 (48.17 per match)
- Top scorer(s): (Brazil) Bruna de Paula (Brazil) Mariana Costa (15 goals)

The 2018 Women's International Tournament of Spain was the 22nd edition of the Women's International Tournament Of Spain, held in Alicante, Spain between 23–25 November as a friendly handball tournament organised by the Royal Spanish Handball Federation as a preparation of the host nation to the 2018 European Women's Handball Championship.

== Results ==
Team	Pld	W	D	L	GF	GA	GD	Pts
Spain	3	2	1	0	73	64	9	5
Brazil	3	1	1	1	74	79	–5	3
Germany	3	1	0	2	67	69	–2	2
Poland	3	1	0	2	75	77	–2	2

== Round robin ==
All times are local (UTC+1).

November 23; 19:00	Germany	19–20	Brazil	Pabellón Pitíu Rochel, Alicante
November 23; 19:00	Zapf, Großmann 3	(8–9)	de Paula 6	Pabellón Pitíu Rochel, Alicante
November 23; 19:00		Report		Pabellón Pitíu Rochel, Alicante

November 23; 21:00	Spain	23–16	Poland	Pabellón Pitíu Rochel, Alicante
November 23; 21:00	Martín, Rodríguez 4	(13–9)	Grzyb 3	Pabellón Pitíu Rochel, Alicante
November 23; 21:00		Report		Pabellón Pitíu Rochel, Alicante

November 24; 19:00	Brazil	26–32	Poland	Pabellón Pitíu Rochel, Alicante
November 24; 19:00	Amorim 4	(13–14)	Łabuda 8	Pabellón Pitíu Rochel, Alicante
November 24; 19:00		Report		Pabellón Pitíu Rochel, Alicante

November 24; 21:00	Spain	22–20	Germany	Pabellón Pitíu Rochel, Alicante
November 24; 21:00	López 5	(11–11)	Müller 5	Pabellón Pitíu Rochel, Alicante
November 24; 21:00		Report		Pabellón Pitíu Rochel, Alicante

November 25; 18:00	Poland	27–28	Germany	Pabellón Pitíu Rochel, Alicante
November 25; 18:00	Kudłacz-Gloc 8	(15–14)	Smits 5	Pabellón Pitíu Rochel, Alicante
November 25; 18:00		Report		Pabellón Pitíu Rochel, Alicante

November 25; 20:00	Spain	28–28	Brazil	Pabellón Pitíu Rochel, Alicante
November 25; 20:00	González, López 5	(17–16)	Costa 7	Pabellón Pitíu Rochel, Alicante
November 25; 20:00		Report		Pabellón Pitíu Rochel, Alicante

== Final standing ==
Rank	Team
Gold medal	Spain
2	Brazil
3	Germany
4	Poland
