= Ivana Božović =

Montenegrin handball player (born 1991)

Personal information
- Nationality: Montenegrin
- Born: 28 January 1991 (age 35) Podgorica, SR Montenegro, SFR Yugoslavia
- Height: 1.78 m (5 ft 10 in)

Sport
- Sport: Handball
- Position: Left back
- Current club: Pogoń Szczecin

Senior clubs
- Years: Team
- 2007–2010: Budućnost
- 2009–2010: WHC Biseri
- 2010–2011: WHC Biseri
- 2011–2012: Budućnost
- 2012–2015: HC Lokomotiva Zagreb
- 2015–2016: CSM Ploiești
- 2016–2017: MKS Selgros Lublin
- 2017–2018: CS Măgura Cisnădie
- 2018–: Pogoń Szczecin
National team
- Years: Team
- –: Montenegro
Medal record
Mediterranean Games
Bronze medal – third place	2009 Pescara	Team

Ivana Božović (born 28 January 1991) is a Montenegrin handballer who plays for Pogoń Szczecin and the Montenegro national team.

== International honours ==
- EHF Champions League:
  - Winner: 2012
- EHF Cup:
  - Winner: 2010
