= Sakura Hauge =

Norwegian Japanese handball player (born 1987)

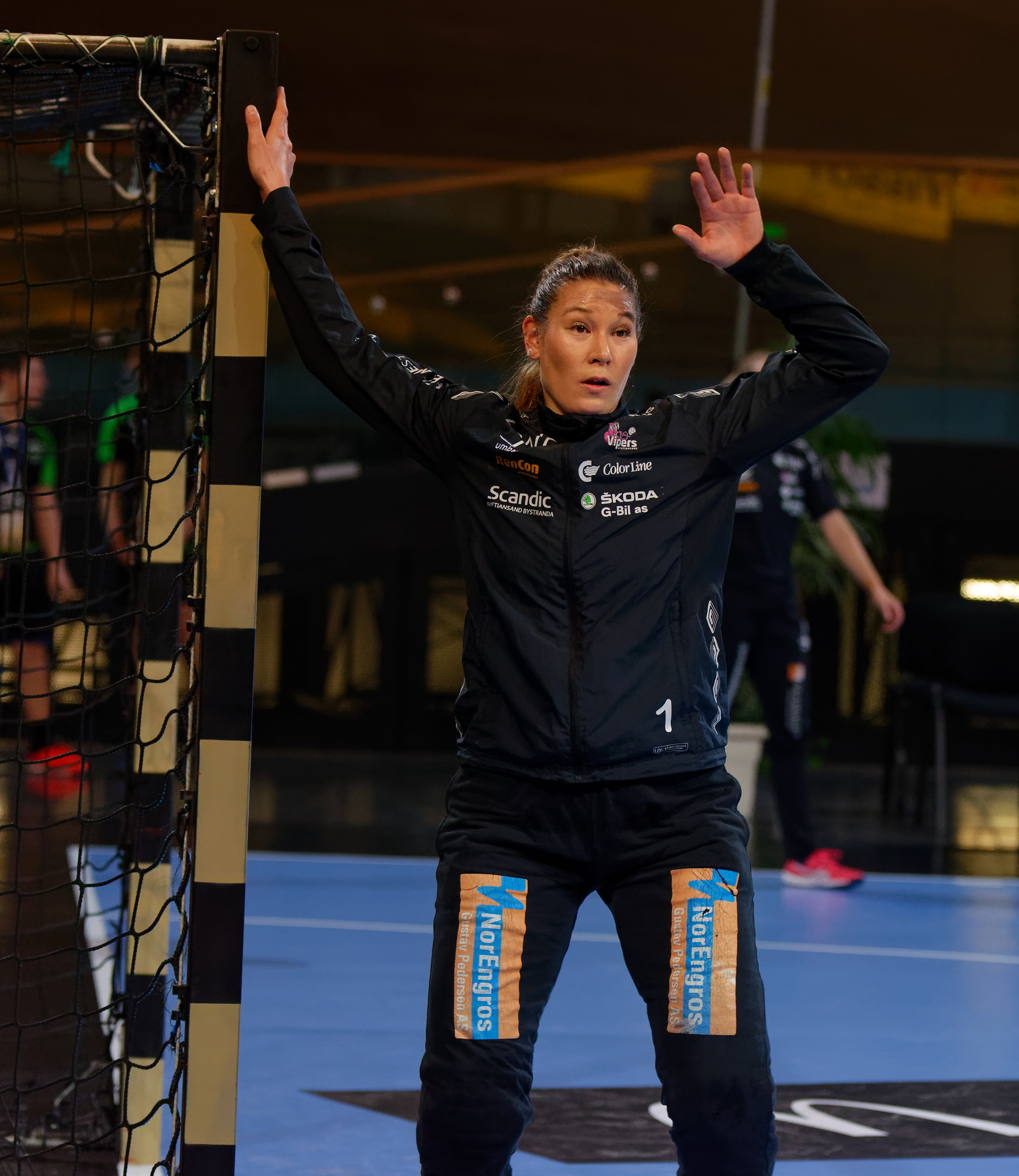
- Hauge in 2018

Personal information
- Nationality: Norwegian; Japanese
- Born: 7 January 1987 (age 39) Bergen, Norway
- Height: 1.73 m (5 ft 8 in)

Sport
- Sport: Handball
- Position: Goalkeeper
- Current club: CSM Slatina
- Number: 87

Senior clubs
- Years: Team
- –: IL Gneist
- –2007: Nordstrand IF
- 2007–2014: Tertnes HE
- 2014–2018: Vipers Kristiansand
- 2018–2019: Nykøbing Falster Håndbold
- 2019–2024: ESBF Besançon
- 2024–2025: ŽRK Budućnost Podgorica
- 2025–2026: Molde Elite
- 2026–: CSM Slatina
National team
Years	Team	Apps	(Gls)
2014	Norway	2	(0)
2015–	Japan	79	(8)
Medal record
Women's handball
Representing Japan
Asian Games
Silver medal – second place	2026 Aichi–Nagoya	Team
Asian Championship
Silver medal – second place	2018 Japan

Sakura Hauge, also known as Sakura Kametani (亀谷 さくら, Kametani Sakura; born 7 January 1987), is a Norwegian-born Japanese handball goalkeeper for CSM Slatina and the Japanese national team.

== Club career ==
Hauge began her career playing for the Bergen-based club IL Gneist, before joining the club Stabæk IF in Bærum. After Stabæk, she played for Nordstrand IF. Beginning in 2007, Hauge played for the club Tertnes HE in Bergen for seven seasons. In 2014, she joined the club Vipers Kristiansand in Kristiansand, signing a two-year contract. Hauge signed a new two-year contract with Vipers Kristiansand in 2016.

== National teams ==
From 2003 to 2005 Hauge played eight matches for the Norway women's national youth handball team. Before that she had played 14 matches for the junior handball team. Although amongst the players chosen for the Norway women's national handball team in the 2010 European Women's Handball Championship, and being a candidate for the Norwegian team at the 2012 Summer Olympics, she then did not play for Norway on a national level before 2014. In 2014 Hauge played two recruit level matches against Sweden, in one of which she was declared Most Valuable Player. In the early 2010s Hauge suffered from jumper's knee.

Citing disillusionment with her lack of prospects at the Norwegian national team, Hauge joined the Japan women's national handball team in 2015, having contacted the Japanese team the previous year. When playing for Japan, she is known as Sakura Kametani. She played three matches for Japan in the 2015 World Women's Handball Championship in Denmark, where Japan ended on 19th place.

In the 2017 World Women's Handball Championship in Germany, she was the leading goalkeeper throughout the tournament for Japan. She played all 6 matches and also scored her first goal for the national team. In the last match, the eight-finals against Netherlands, she was named player of the match after Japan lost 24–26 after extra time.

She represented Japan again at the 2025 World Championship.

== Achievements ==
- EHF Cup:
  - Finalist: 2018
- Norwegian League:
  - Winner: 2017/2018
  - Bronze: 2025/2026
- Norwegian Cup:
  - Winner: 2017
  - Finalist: 2013
- Danish Cup:
  - Winner: 2018
- Carpathian Trophy:
  - Winner: 2019

== Individual awards ==
- Carpathian Trophy Best Goalkeeper: 2019

== Personal life ==
Hauge was born in Bergen, Norway, to a Japanese mother and a Norwegian father. She grew up in her father's home town of Bergen. In primary and secondary school, she received Japanese language lessons (mother tongue instruction). During her childhood, the family would holiday in Hauge's mother's home town of Okayama. From age 15 to 20, she lived in Oslo.
