= Florina Chintoan =

Romanian handball player (born 1985)

Personal information
- Full name: Florina Maria Chintoan
- Nationality: Romanian
- Born: 6 December 1985 (age 40) Cluj Napoca, Romania
- Height: 1.78 m (5 ft 10 in)

Sport
- Sport: Handball
- Position: Pivot
- Current club: Jolidon Cluj
- Number: 10
National team
Years	Team	Apps	(Gls)
–	Romania	111	(151)
Medal record
European Championship
Bronze medal – third place	2010 Denmark/Norway

Florina Maria Chintoan (née Bârsan, born 6 December 1985) is a Romanian handball player for Jolidon Cluj.
