= Magdalena Paraschiv =

Romanian handball player (born 1982)

Personal information
- Nationality: Romanian
- Born: 11 August 1982 (age 44) Buzău, Romania
- Height: 1.68 m (5 ft 6 in)

Sport
- Sport: Handball
- Position: Right wing
- Current club: Gloria Bistrița
- Number: 3
National team
Years	Team	Apps	(Gls)
2010–2012	Romania	29	(32)
Medal record
European Championship
Bronze medal – third place	2010 Denmark & Norway	Team

Magdalena Paraschiv (born 11 August 1982) is a Romanian handball player. She plays for the Romanian club Gloria Bistrița.

== International honours ==
- EHF Challenge Cup:
  - Finalist: 2004, 2007
