= CS Universitatea Reșița =

Romanian women's handball club

- Full name: Clubul Sportiv Universitatea Reșița
- Short name: CSU Reșița
- Founded: 2004
- Arena: Sala Polivalentă
- Capacity: 1,669
- President: (Romania) Octavian Măzăran
- League: Divizia A
- 2018–19: Divizia A, Seria D, 3rd
- Club colours
| Home | Away |

Universitatea Reșița is a women handball club from Reşiţa, Romania, which plays in the Romanian Women's Handball League.

Location of CS Universitatea Reșița

== Kits ==
HOME

2014–18

AWAY
| 2013–14 | 2018–19 | 2020- |
