= Dagmara Nocuń =

Polish handball player (born 1996)

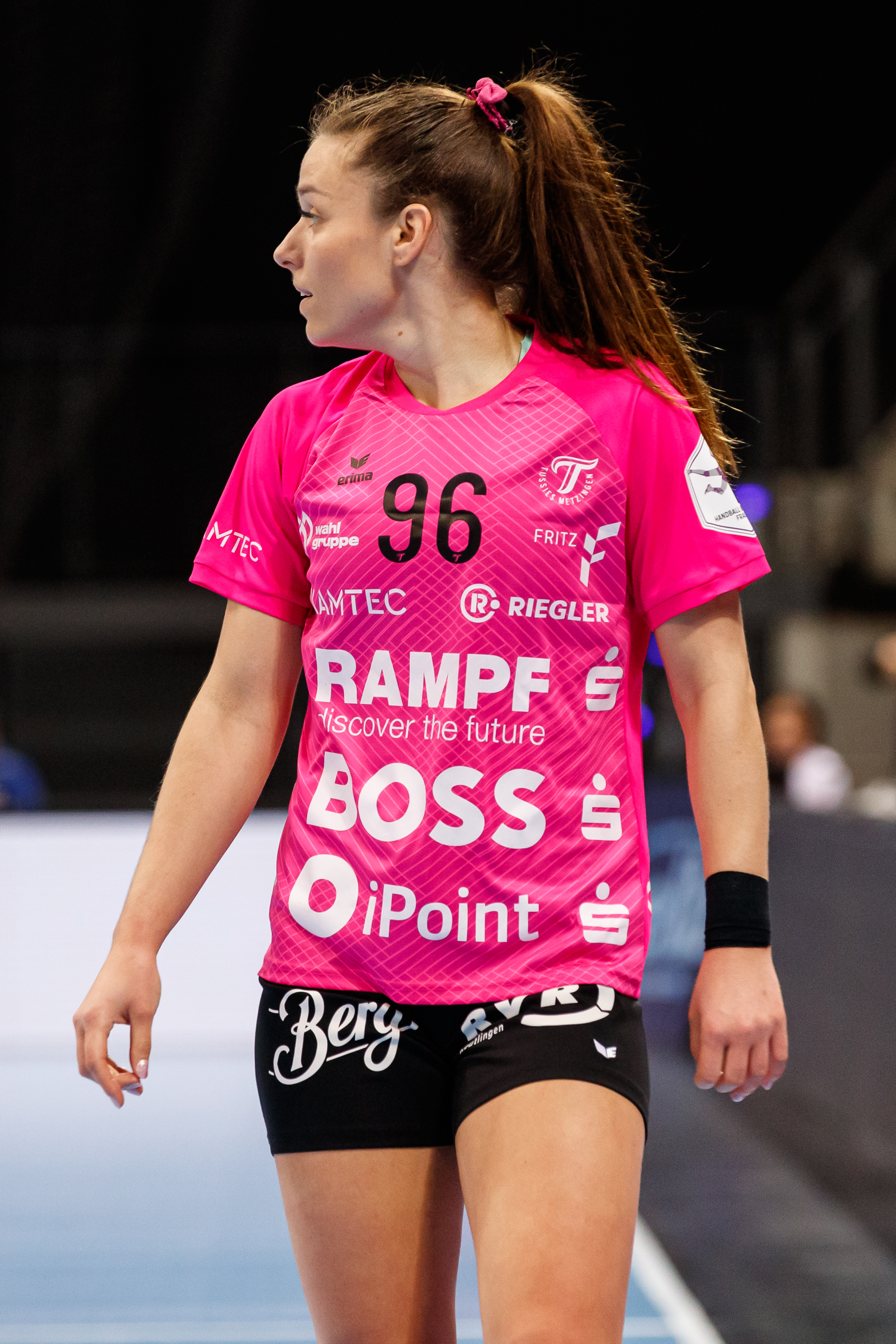

Personal information
- Nationality: Polish
- Born: 2 January 1996 (age 30) Kolno, Poland
- Height: 1.66 m (5 ft 5 in)

Sport
- Sport: Handball
- Position: Left wing
- Current club: ZRK Buducnost
- Number: 96

Senior clubs
- Years: Team
- 2011–2013: SMS Gliwice
- 2013–2014: SMS Płock
- 2014–2021: MKS Selgros Lublin
- 2015–2016: → MKS Olimpia-Beskid (loan)
- 2021–2024: TuS Metzingen
- 2024-2025: CS Gloria Bistrița-Năsăud
- 2025-: ŽRK Budućnost Podgorica
National team
Years	Team	Apps	(Gls)
2017–	Poland	73	(120)
- Updated on 18 December 2025

Dagmara Nocuń (born 2 January 1996) is a Polish handballer for ZRK Buducnost and the Polish national team.

She represented Poland at the 2020 European Women's Handball Championship.

== Achievements ==
- Mistrzostwa Polski:
  - Winner: 2015
