= Cristina Petrovici =

Romanian handball player (born 1950)

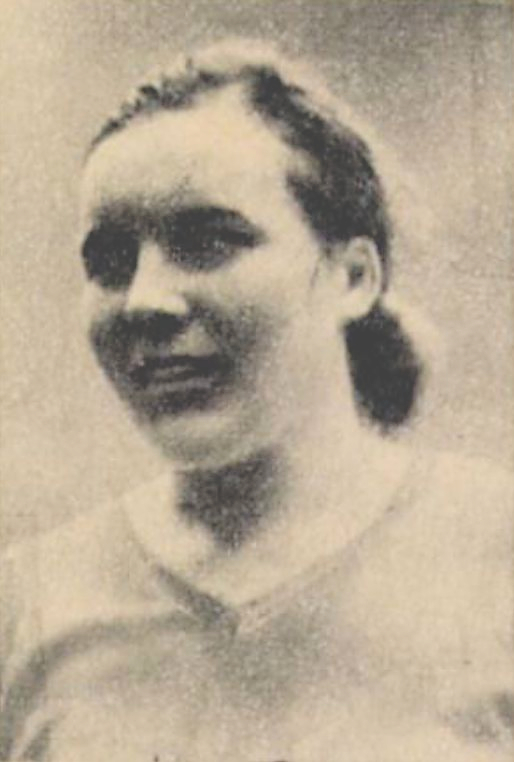
Image of Christine Petrovici

Cristina Petrovici (born 18 November 1950) is a former Romanian handball player who competed in the 1976 Summer Olympics.

She was part of the Romanian handball team which finished fourth in the Olympic tournament. She played four matches and scored three goals.
