= CS Dinamo București (women's handball) =

Romanian women's handball team

HC Dinamo Bitcoin București
- Full name: Handbal Club Dinamo Bitcoin București
- Short name: Dinamo; Bitcoin
- Founded: 2016
- Arena: Dinamo Polyvalent Hall
- Capacity: 2,538
- President: Constantin Căliman
- Head coach: Nicoleta Alexandrescu
- League: Divizia A
- 2018–19: Divizia A, Seria B, 3rd
- Club colours
Home	Away

Handbal Club Dinamo Bitcoin București, also known as HC Dinamo Bitcoin București or HC Dinamo Bitcoin, is a women's handball team based in Bucharest, Romania. They are sponsored by Bitcoin.

== History ==
The general multisports club was founded in the spring of 1948, being subordinate to the Ministry of the Interior. From the beginning it was intended to be a strong competitor to the Romanian Army's sports club, CSCA București, later known as CSA Steaua București. The women's handball team was founded in 2016.

== Kits ==
HOME
2016-17	2017–20

AWAY
2015-17	2017–20

== Players ==
=== Current squad ===
As of 30 June 2017

Goalkeepers

- 12 (Romania) Florina Mădălina Bălan
- 22 (Romania) Isabela Roșca
- (Romania) Gabriela Dobre Vasile

Wingers
RW

- 6 (Romania) Florența Ilie

LW

- 7 (Romania) Camelia Carabulea
- 14 (Romania) Diana Predoi

Line players

- 30 (Romania) Manuela Manda

Backs
LB

- 10 (Romania) Raluca Petruș
- 29 (Romania) Adina Grigoraș
- (Romania) Cristina Predoi

CB

- 77 (Romania) Andreea Popa

=== Transfers ===
Transfers for the 2017-2018

Joining

Leaving

- (Brazil) Caroline Martins to ( (Norway) Molde Elite)

== Personnel ==
=== Current technical staff ===
Position	Staff
Head coach	(Romania) Nicoleta Alexandrescu
Assistant coach	(Romania) Ion Ivan
Kinetotherapist	(Romania) Marian Stan

Last updated: 3 April 2017
