= Doina Cojocaru =

Romanian handball player (1948-1996)

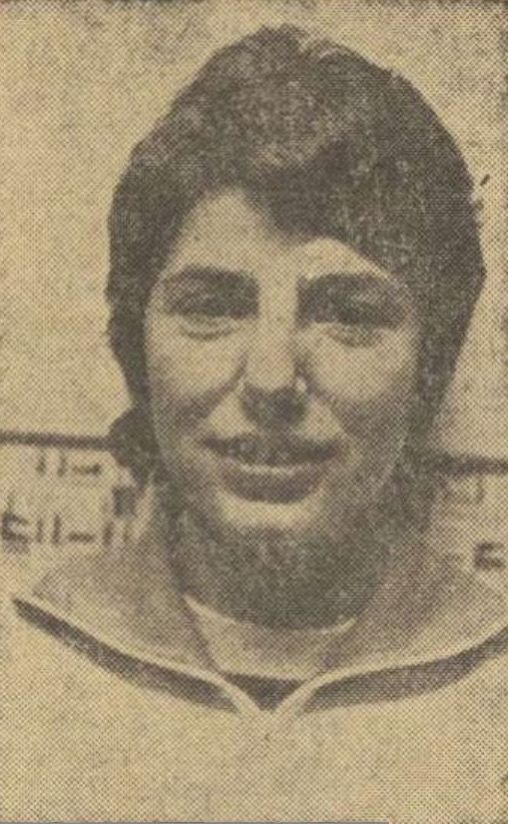

Personal information
- Nationality: Romanian
- Born: 25 November 1948 Sighișoara, Romania
- Died: 14 December 1996 (aged 48)
- Height: 1.76 m (5 ft 9 in)

Sport
- Sport: Handball
- Position: Centre back

Youth career
- Years: Team
- –: Ș.S.E. Orașul Victoria
National team
Years	Team	Apps	(Gls)
1967-1976	Romania	182	(285)
Medal record
World Championship
Silver medal – second place	1973 Yugoslavia

Doina Petruţa Băicoianu Cojocaru (November 25, 1948 in Sighişoara – December 14, 1996) was a Romanian handball player who competed in the 1976 Summer Olympics.

She was part of the Romanian handball team, which finished fourth in the Olympic tournament. She played all five matches and scored one goal.
