= CS Gloria Bistrița (handball) =

Women's handball club in Bistrița-Năsăud, Romania

CS Gloria 2018
- Full name: Clubul Sportiv Gloria Bistrița
- Short name: Gloria
- Founded: 2009; 17 years ago
- Arena: TeraPlast Arena
- Capacity: 3,007
- President: Eugen Cosma
- Head coach: Carlos Viver
- League: Liga Națională
- 2025-26: Liga Națională, 1st of 12
- Club colours
Home	Away

Clubul Sportiv Gloria Bistrița, commonly known as Gloria Bistrița and colloquially as Gloria, is a professional women's handball team based in Bistrița, Bistrița-Năsăud, Transylvania, Romania, that competes in the Liga Naţională and the EHF Champions League, and is part of the multi-sport club with the same name, which also includes a men’s football section.

Gloria were runners-up in the 2023–24 EHF European League, while also qualifying for the quarterfinals of the EHF Champions League. They also won the Cupa României for the first time in 2025-2026.

== Honours ==
=== Domestic competitions ===
Liga Națională (National League of Romania)

- Winners: (1) 2026
- Third place: 2018–19, 2022–23, 2023–24

Cupa României (National Cup of Romania)

- Winners: (1) 2026
- Finalists: 2025
- Third place: 2017, 2024

Supercupa României (Super Cup of Romania)

- Winners: (1) 2026
- Finalists: 2024, 2025

=== European competitions ===
- EHF Champions League: 2025–26
  - Quarterfinalists: 2025

EHF European League

- Finalists: 2023–24

== Team ==
=== Current squad 2026/27 ===
Goalkeepers

- 1 (Romania) Daciana Hosu
- 12 (Romania) Daria Uhrec
- 16 (Sweden) Evelina Eriksson

Wings

LW

- 17 (Spain) Jennifer Gutiérrez Bermejo
- 67 (Czech Republic) Veronika Malá
- 89 (Romania) Corina Lupei

RW

- 27 (Japan) Asuka Fujita
- 30 (Romania) Sonia Seraficeanu

Line Players

- 3 (Romania) Iaroslava Burlachenko
- 19 (Spain) Kaba Gassama (pregnant)
- 32 (Romania) Daria Utan
- 37 (Romania) Lorena Ostase

Back Line

LB

- 10 (Spain) Danila So Delgado
- 22 (Spain) Lara González
- 29 (Austria) Johanna Reichert

CB

- 7 (Portugal) Mariana Lopes
- 8 (Angola) Helena Paulo
- 9 (Netherlands) Larissa Nüsser

RB

- 6 (Germany) Nina Engel
- 11 (Romania) Martina Stan
- 23 (Spain) Paula Arcos

=== Transfers ===
Transfers for the season 2026-27

=== Staff members ===
- (Spain) Head Coach: Carlos Viver
- (Spain) Assistant Coach: Quino Soler Teruel
- (Romania) Goalkeeper coach: Levente Kocs
- (Spain) Fitness Coach: Dario Mata Bejar

=== Notable former players ===
- (Romania) Oana Țiplea
- (Romania) Magdalena Paraschiv
- (Romania) Valentina Ardean-Elisei
- (Romania) Ana Maria Iuganu
- (Romania) Laura Moisă
- (Romania) Melinda Geiger
- (Romania) Laura Pristăviță
- (Romania) Iulia Dumanska
- (Serbia) Jovana Kovačević
- (Serbia) Željka Nikolić
- (Serbia) Jelena Trifunović
- (Spain) Darly Zoqbi de Paula
- (Spain) Alexandrina Barbosa
- (Brazil) Mariana Costa
- (Slovenia) Nina Zulić
- (Denmark) Ida-Marie Dahl
- (Montenegro) Nina Bulatović
- (France) Déborah Kpodar

== Statistics ==
=== Top scorers in the EHF Champions League ===
Last updated on 14 January 2025

Rank	Name	Seasons played	Goals
1	(Spain) Danila So Delgado	2	117
2	(Japan) Asuka Fujita	2	64
3	(Romania) Sonia Seraficeanu	2	49
4	(Spain) Sayna Mbengue	2	43
5	(Brazil) Tamires Morena	2	36
6	(Romania) Bianca Bazaliu	2	33
7	(Russia) Valeriia Kirdiasheva	1	32
8	(Romania) Lorena Ostase	1	31
9	(Poland) Dagmara Nocuń	1	31
10	(Netherlands) Larissa Nüsser	1	30
