= CS Măgura Cisnădie (handball) =

Romanian women's handball club

- Full name: Clubul Sportiv Măgura Cisnădie
- Short name: Măgura
- Founded: 2014; 12 years ago
- Arena: Sala Polivalentă "Măgura"
- Capacity: 820
- President: (Romania) Dănuț Filip
- Head coach: (Romania) Victorina Bora
- League: Liga Națională
- 2023–24: Liga Națională, 10th of 14
- Club colours
Home	Away

CS Măgura Cisnădie is a professional women's handball club in Cisnădie, Sibiu County, Romania, that competes in the Liga Naţională.

Location of CS Măgura Cisnădie

== Kits ==
HOME
2017–18	2018-

AWAY
2017–18	2018–

THIRD
2017–18	2018–

== Honours ==
=== Domestic competitions ===
Liga Națională (National League of Romania)

- Third place: 2017–18

== Team ==
=== Current squad 2025/26 ===
Goalkeepers

- 43 (Montenegro) Marta Batinović
- 85 (Romania) Mirela Pașca

Wingers
LW

- 2 (Serbia) Sanja Radosavljević
- 14 (Romania) Dana Abed Kader
- 18 (Romania) Oana Andreea Sîrb

RW

- 10 (Romania) Gabriela Moldoveanu
- 17 (Serbia) Nataša Lovrić

Line players

- 4 (France) Louise Cusset
- 25 (Romania) Cynthia Tomescu

Back players
LB

- 36 (Slovakia) Tatiana Šutranová

CB

- 27 (Romania) Krisztina Tóth
- 77 (Romania) Valentina Bardac

RB

- 55 (Romania) Sabrina Lazea
- 96 (Romania) Alina Ilie

=== Transfers ===
Transfers for the 2025-26 season

Joining

Leaving

- (Romania) Elena Rosu (CB) (to (Romania) HC Dunărea Brăila)
- (Montenegro) Marina Rajčić (GK) (to (Romania) SCM Craiova (women's handball)
- (Republic of the Congo) Fanta Diagouraga (LB) (with immediate effect)

== Notable former players ==
- (Romania) Ada Moldovan
- (Romania) Raluca Băcăoanu
- (Romania) Ana Maria Tănasie
- (Romania) Adriana Crăciun
- (Romania) Oana Apetrei
- (Romania) Nicoleta Tudor
- (Romania) Alina Horjea
- (Romania) Cătălina Cioaric
- (Romania) Mihaela Popescu
- (Brazil) Deonise Fachinello
- (Brazil) Larissa Araújo
- (Brazil) Mariana Costa
- (Brazil) Gabriela Moreschi
- (Brazil) Jaqueline Anastácio
- (Montenegro) Jasna Boljević
- (Montenegro) Ivana Božović
- (Montenegro) Dijana Ujkić
- (Montenegro) Nataša Krnić
