= CS Universitatea Cluj-Napoca (women's handball) =

Romanian women's handball club

Universitatea Cluj-Napoca
- Full name: Clubul Sportiv Universitatea Cluj-Napoca
- Short name: U Cluj
- Founded: 1968; 57 years ago
- Arena: BTarena
- Capacity: 10,000
- President: Sorin Grozav
- Head coach: Alexandru Curescu
- League: Liga Națională
- 2019–20: Liga Națională, 12th of 14
- Club colours
Home	Away

CS Universitatea Cluj-Napoca is a Romanian women's handball club from Cluj-Napoca, that plays in the Liga Națională.

== Kits ==
HOME
2013–14	2014-15	2017–18	2018–19	2019–

AWAY
2013–14	2014-15	2018–19	2019-

THIRD

2019-20

== Results ==
- Liga Naţională:
  - Silver: 2010, 2011, 2012
  - Bronze: 1998, 2007, 2013
- Supercupa României :
  - Finalists: 2013
- EHF Challenge Cup:
  - Finalists: 2007

== Players ==
=== Current squad 2020-2021 ===
As of 20 June 2020

Goalkeepers

- 1 (Romania) Mădălina Ion
- 12 (Romania) Marina Dumanska
- 26 (Romania) Viorica Țăgean

Wingers

- (Romania) Andreea Barbos
- (Romania) Denisa Șelever
- (Romania) Florența Ilie
- (Romania) Raluca Nicolae

Line Players

- 10 (Romania) Florina Chintoan (c)
- (Romania) Ana Maria Dumitrașcu

Back Players
LB

- 19 (Romania) Diana Lazăr
- (Romania) Corina Cordoș
- (Romania) Selena Demian

CB

- 17 (Romania) Rebeca Necula
- (Spain) Judith Vizuete

RB

- (Poland) Paulina Masna
- (Romania) Bianca Lupașcu

=== Selected former players ===
- (Romania) Carmen Amariei-Lungu
- (Romania) Cristina Dogaru-Cucuian
- (Romania) Ionica Munteanu
- (Romania) Alina Ariton
- (Romania) Oana Chirilă
- (Romania) Georgeta Vârtic
- (Romania) Simona Vintilă
- (Romania) Alina Ţurcaş
- (Romania) Nicoleta Dincă
- (Romania) Clara Vădineanu
- (Romania) Cristina Laslo
- (Romania) Ionica Munteanu
- (Romania) Laura Popa
- (Hungary) Viktória Petróczi

=== Selected former coaches ===
- (Romania) Dinu Cojocaru
- (Romania) Liviu Jurcă
- (Romania) Gheorghe Covaciu
