= HCM Slobozia (women's handball) =

Romanian handball club

- Full name: Handbal Club Municipal Slobozia
- Short name: HCM
- Founded: 2008; 18 years ago
- Arena: Polyvalent Hall Slobozia
- Capacity: 150
- President: (Romania) Nicolae Goidea
- Head coach: (Romania) Gheorghe Covaciu
- League: Liga Națională
- 2019–20: 13th of 14
- Club colours
Home	Away

HCM Slobozia is a women's handball club from Slobozia, Romania, that plays in the Liga Națională.

Location of HCM Slobozia

== Kits ==
HOME
2016–17	2017–19	2019–

AWAY
2017–18	2018–19	2019–20

THIRD
2016–17	2017–19	2019–20

== Honours ==
- Divizia A
  - Runners-up (1): 2018–19

== 2020–2021 Team ==
=== Current squad ===
Goalkeepers

Wingers

- 25 (Romania) Gabriela Moldoveanu
- 97 (Romania) Catalina Sava

Line players

Back players

== 2019–20 HCM Slobozia season ==
=== Players ===
==== Players In ====
- (Romania) Florenta Ilie (RW)
- (Romania) Gabriela Moldoveanu (RW)
- (Romania) Ana Ciolan (PV)
- (Romania) Alexandra Banciu (CB)
- (Romania) Ștefania Bălăceanu (LB)
