= SCM Craiova =

Romanian omnisports club

- Full name: Sport Club Municipal Craiova
- Nicknames: Alb-Albaștrii (The White and Blues)
- Founded: 1948; 78 years ago CS Universitatea Craiova; 2006; 20 years ago SCM Craiova
- Based in: Craiova, Romania
- Colours: White, Blue
- Owner: Craiova Municipality
- Chairman: Pavel Badea
- Website: Official website

SCM Craiova is a Romanian sports society from Craiova, Romania, founded in 2006. SCM as a subordinated of CS Universitatea Craiova, mother club, administrates basketball, handball, volleyball and boxing sections while CS Universitatea administrates athletics, badminton, bridge, chess, fencing, judo, karate, table tennis and wrestling sections. Football section was originally a section of CS Universitatea Craiova but now is limited private, but still tied of this multi-sports association between SCM and CS Universitatea.
