= Divizia A (women's handball) =

- Founded: 1933; 93 years ago (in 11 players); 1958; 68 years ago (in 7 players)
- First season: 1958–59
- No. of teams: 27
- Country: (Romania)
- Confederation: EHF
- Most recent champions: Gloria Buzău; Minaur Baia Mare (2017–18)
- Level on pyramid: 2
- Promotion to: Liga Națională
- Website: Romanian Handball Federation
- 2018–19 Divizia A

The Divizia A is the second level of the Romanian women's professional handball system. The league comprises twenty nine teams.

== History ==
This sport was first played in Romania in 1920. After a visit in Germany, a few physical education teachers introduced this sport in their classes. The Divizia A was founded in 1933 (in 11 players) and in 1958 in the current format with 7 players. The current champions are Gloria Buzău (Seria A) and Minaur Baia Mare (Seria B).

== See also ==
- Men's Divizia A
