= CSM Slatina (women's handball) =

Romanian handball club

- Full name: Clubul Sportiv Municipal Slatina
- Founded: 25 June 2009; 17 years ago
- Arena: Sala LPS
- President: (Romania)
- Head coach: (Romania) Andrei Popescu
- League: Liga Națională
- 2025–26: Liga Națională, 6th of 12
- Club colours
Home	Away

Clubul Sportiv Municipal Slatina, commonly known as CSM Slatina, is a women's handball club from Slatina, Romania, that plays in the Liga Națională. The club was founded on 25 June 2009.

Location of CSM Slatina

== Kits ==
HOME
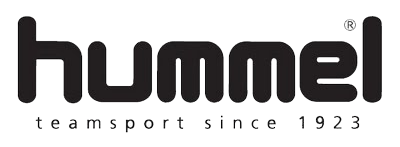
2017–

AWAY
2018–19	2019–

THIRD
2018–19	2019–20	2020-

== Honours ==
=== Domestic competitions ===
- Divizia A
  - Winners: 2016–17

== Players ==
=== Current squad ===
As of July 2026

Goalkeepers

- 32 (Romania) Raluca Kelemen
- 16 (Romania) Elena Nagy
- 87 (Japan) Sakura Hauge

Wingers
Left Wings

- 2 (Romania) Nicoleta Dincă
- 96 (Romania) Hermina Olaru

Right Wings

- 11 (Romania) Valentina Lecu
- 71 (Poland) Adrianna Górna

Pivot

- 9 (Romania) Elena Popescu
- 10 (Romania) Sonia Vasiliu
- 23 (Romania) Andreea Țîrle
- 97 (Montenegro) Nikolina Vukčević

Backs
Left Backs

- 4 (Hungary) Gréta Kácsor
- 21 (Angola) Magda Cazanga
- 98 (Romania) Mara Matea

Centre Back

- 14 (Hungary) Tamara Pál
- 22 (Romania) Luciana Popescu
- 33 (Sweden) Amelia Lundbäck

Right Back

- 13 (Japan) Kaho Nakayama
- 28 (Hungary) Nikolett Papp

=== Transfers ===
Transfers for the 2026–27 season

Joining

- (Hungary) Nikolett Papp (RB) (from (Romania) Minaur Baia Mare)
- (Japan) Kaho Nakayama (RB) (from (Germany) BSV Sachsen Zwickau)
- (Poland) Adrianna Górna (RW) (from (Poland) MKS Lublin)
- (Japan) Sakura Hauge (GK) (from (Norway) Molde Elite)
- (Sweden) Amelia Lundbäck (CB) (from (Romania) Minaur Baia Mare)

Leaving

- (Poland) Magda Balsam (RW) (to (Romania) CSM Corona Brașov)
