= 2023–24 Debreceni VSC (women's handball) season =

DVSC Schaeffler sports season

DVSC Schaeffler
2023–24 season
- President: (Hungary) Zsolt Ábrók
- Manager: (Hungary) Zoltán Szilágyi
- Stadium: Hódos Imre Sports Hall
- NB I: 4th place
- Hungarian Cup: Bronze 3rd place
- EHF Champions League: Playoff
Home colours	Away colours

The 2023–24 season is Debreceni VSC's 44th competitive and consecutive season in the Nemzeti Bajnokság I and 75th year in existence as a handball club.

Since August 2018 they are sponsored by Schaeffler Group, so the official name for the team is DVSC Schaeffler.

== Players ==
=== Squad information ===
Goalkeepers (GK)

- 16 (Croatia) Gabrijela Bartulović
- 94 (France) Catherine Gabriel

Left wingers (LW)

- 24 (Hungary) Míra Vámos
- 71 (Hungary) Mirtill Petrus

Right wingers (RW)

- 18 (Hungary) Vivien Grosch
- 28 (Hungary) Alexandra Töpfner
- 88 (Brazil) Mariana Costa

Line players (LP)

- 9 (Hungary) Kata Juhász
- 13 (Hungary) Petra Füzi-Tóvizi
- 55 (Netherlands) Tamara Haggerty

Left backs (LB)

- 22 (Serbia) Jovana Jovović
- 44 (Hungary) Gréta Kácsor
- 92 (Hungary) Dóra Hornyák

Centre backs (CB)

- 25 (Hungary) Liliána Csernyánszki
- 38 (Hungary) Petra Vámos (c)
- 83 (Hungary) Dorina Kelemen
- 81 (Hungary) Nina Szabó

Right backs (RB)

- 5 (Hungary) Konszuéla Hámori
- 7 (Sweden) Elinore Johansson
- 43 (Hungary) Szimonetta Planéta
- 29 (Hungary) Nóra Nagy

=== Transfers ===
==== 2023–24 season ====
Transfers for the 2023–24 season

Joining

- (Croatia) Gabrijela Bartulović (GK) (from (Hungary) Dunaújvárosi Kohász KA)
- (Hungary) Kata Juhász (LP) (from (Hungary) Nemzeti Kézilabda Akadémia)
- (Hungary) Vivien Grosch (RW) (from (Hungary) MTK Budapest)
- (Sweden) Elinore Johansson (RB) (from (Norway) Storhamar HE)
- (Netherlands) Tamara Haggerty (LP) (from (Denmark) HH Elite)
- (Hungary) Nina Szabó (CB) (on loan from (Hungary) MTK Budapest)

Leaving

- (Germany) Ann-Cathrin Giegerich (GK) (to (Montenegro) ŽRK Budućnost Podgorica)
- (Hungary) Réka Bordás (LP) (to (Hungary) Ferencvárosi TC)
- (Hungary) Nina Szabó (CB) (on loan to (Hungary) MTK Budapest)
- (Hungary) Anna Panyi (LB) (on loan to (Hungary) Érd HC)
- (Hungary) Vanessa Torda (GK) (on loan to (Hungary) Kisvárdai KC)
- (Hungary) Zoé Makó (LW) (to (Hungary) Kisvárdai KC)

==== 2024–25 season ====
Transfers for the 2024–25 season

Joining

- (Hungary) Nikolett Tóth (CB) (from (Hungary) Mosonmagyaróvári KC SE)
- (France) Océane Sercien-Ugolin (RB) (from (Norway) Vipers Kristiansand)
- (Sweden) Kristin Thorleifsdóttir (LB) (from (Denmark) HH Elite)
- (Austria) Kristina Dramac (LB) (from (Croatia) RK Lokomotiva Zagreb)

Leaving

- (Hungary) Petra Vámos (CB) (to (France) Metz Handball)
- (Hungary) Szimonetta Planéta (RB) (to (Poland) MKS Lublin)
- (Hungary) Gréta Kácsor (LB) (to (Romania) Gloria Bistrița)
- (Sweden) Elinore Johansson (RB) (to (Germany) TuS Metzingen)

== Club ==
=== Technical Staff ===
Position	Staff member
President	(Hungary) Zsolt Ábrók
Technical manager	(Hungary) Marietta Vágó
Head coach	(Hungary) Zoltán Szilágyi
Assistant coach	(Hungary) Kitti Kudor
Goalkeeping coach	(Slovenia) Grega Karpan
Team doctor	(Hungary) Dr. Tamás Bazsó
Physiotherapist	(Hungary) Attila Kazsimér
Physiotherapist	(Hungary) Laura Kerék
Fitness coach	(Hungary) Örs Sebestyén
Video Analytics	(Hungary) Attila Kun

Source: Coaches, Management

=== Uniform ===
- Supplier: (Germany) Adidas
- Main sponsor: Shaeffler / tippmix / Tranzit-Food / City of Debrecen / Manz
- Back sponsor: Volkswagen / Globus / Cívis Ház
- Arm sponsor: BCB Higiénia / EHF
- Shorts sponsor: Miko Coffee / CTS Informatika / MySeyu / Team&Event / tippmix

== Pre-season and friendlies ==
=== Friendlies matches ===
21 July 2023; 16:00	MTK Budapest	30–31	DVSC Schaeffler	Riz Levente Sport és Rendvezvény Központ, Budapest
21 July 2023; 16:00	Farkas 8	(17–16)	Töpfner 8	Riz Levente Sport és Rendvezvény Központ, Budapest
21 July 2023; 16:00		Report		Riz Levente Sport és Rendvezvény Központ, Budapest

28 July 2023; 16:00	DVSC Schaeffler	34–33	FTC-Rail Cargo Hungaria	Hódos Imre Sports Hall, Debrecen
28 July 2023; 16:00	Planéta, P. Vámos 7	(19–18)	Malestein 10	Hódos Imre Sports Hall, Debrecen
28 July 2023; 16:00	3× (suspension)	Report	4× (suspension)	Hódos Imre Sports Hall, Debrecen

=== International tournament – Bistrița (ROU) ===
4 August 2023; 15:00 (16:00 UTC+2)	(Romania) SCM Gloria Buzău	26–30	DVSC Schaeffler	TeraPlast Arena, Bistrița (Romania); Attendance: 500
4 August 2023; 15:00 (16:00 UTC+2)		(15–17)	Füzi-Tóvizi, Kácsor 5	TeraPlast Arena, Bistrița (Romania); Attendance: 500
4 August 2023; 15:00 (16:00 UTC+2)	7× (suspension)	Report	5× (suspension)	TeraPlast Arena, Bistrița (Romania); Attendance: 500

6 August 2023; 17:00 (18:00 UTC+2); Final	(Romania) CS Gloria Bistrița	31–22	DVSC Schaeffler	TeraPlast Arena, Bistrița (Romania); Attendance: 2500
6 August 2023; 17:00 (18:00 UTC+2); Final		(16–9)	Jovović 6	TeraPlast Arena, Bistrița (Romania); Attendance: 2500
6 August 2023; 17:00 (18:00 UTC+2); Final	9× (suspension)	Report	7× (suspension)	TeraPlast Arena, Bistrița (Romania); Attendance: 2500

=== International tournament – Debrecen (HUN) ===
16 August 2023; 18:00	DVSC Schaeffler	25–25	(Romania) CS Gloria Bistrița	Hódos Imre Sports Hall, Debrecen; Attendance: 300; Referees: L. Sándor, Cs. Szikszay (HUN)
16 August 2023; 18:00	Csernyánszki 5	(12–13)	Lima, Posavec 5	Hódos Imre Sports Hall, Debrecen; Attendance: 300; Referees: L. Sándor, Cs. Szikszay (HUN)
16 August 2023; 18:00	3× (suspension)	Report	5× (suspension)	Hódos Imre Sports Hall, Debrecen; Attendance: 300; Referees: L. Sándor, Cs. Szikszay (HUN)

18 August 2023; 11:00	DVSC Schaeffler	32–22	(South Korea) SK Sugar Gliders	Hódos Imre Sports Hall, Debrecen; Attendance: 100; Referees: B. Bátori, Szécsi-Lantos (HUN)
18 August 2023; 11:00	Töpfner 7	(13–10)		Hódos Imre Sports Hall, Debrecen; Attendance: 100; Referees: B. Bátori, Szécsi-Lantos (HUN)
18 August 2023; 11:00	3× (suspension)	Report	4× (suspension)	Hódos Imre Sports Hall, Debrecen; Attendance: 100; Referees: B. Bátori, Szécsi-Lantos (HUN)

=== Friendlies match ===
23 August 2023; 16:00	FTC-Rail Cargo Hungaria	31–28	DVSC Schaeffler	Elek Gyula Aréna, Budapest; Attendance: 300; Referees: Felhő, Öcsi (HUN)
23 August 2023; 16:00	Klujber 6	(15–13)	P. Vámos 7	Elek Gyula Aréna, Budapest; Attendance: 300; Referees: Felhő, Öcsi (HUN)
23 August 2023; 16:00	1× (suspension)	Report	3× (suspension)	Elek Gyula Aréna, Budapest; Attendance: 300; Referees: Felhő, Öcsi (HUN)

== Competitions ==
=== Overall record ===
Competition	First match	Last match	Starting round	Record							
Competition	First match	Last match	Starting round	Pld	W	D	L	GF	GA	GD	Win %
Nemzeti Bajnokság I	1 September 2023	25 May 2024	Matchday 1	26	21	0	5	833	652	+181	80.77
Magyar Kupa	10 January 2024	10 March 2024	Round 4	4	2	1	1	124	107	+17	50.00
EHF Champions League	9 September 2023	23 March 2024	Group stage	16	7	2	7	449	470	−21	43.75
Total				46	30	3	13	1,406	1,229	+177	65.22

Source: Competitions

=== Nemzeti Bajnokság I ===
==== League table ====
Pos	Team	Pld	W	D	L	GF	GA	GD	Pts	Qualification or relegation
1	FTC–Rail Cargo Hungaria	26	25	0	1	950	668	+282	50	Qualification to Champions League group stage
2	Győri Audi ETO KC	26	24	0	2	922	611	+311	48	Qualification to Champions League group stage
3	Motherson–Mosonmagyaróvár (Note: Debrecen-Mosonmagyaróvár 33–27 (+6); Mosonmagyaróvár–Debrecen 30–23 (+7); Head-to-head goal difference: Mosonmagyaróvár +1)	26	22	0	4	933	708	+225	44	Qualification to Champions League group stage
4	DVSC Schaeffler (Note: Debrecen-Mosonmagyaróvár 33–27 (+6); Mosonmagyaróvár–Debrecen 30–23 (+7); Head-to-head goal difference: Debrecen –1)	26	21	0	5	833	652	+181	42	Qualification to European League group phase
5	Praktiker–Vác	26	14	0	12	718	702	+16	28	Qualification to European League third qualifying round
6	MTK Budapest	26	12	3	11	764	817	−53	27	
7	Moyra–Budaörs Handball	26	12	1	13	712	763	−51	25	
8	Dunaújváros	26	10	0	16	689	794	−105	20	
9	Alba Fehérvár KC	26	8	2	16	721	814	−93	18	
10	Kisvárda Master Good SE	26	7	1	18	646	749	−103	15	
11	Vasas SC	26	6	2	18	655	777	−122	14	
12	TAPPE–Békéscsaba	26	6	1	19	667	794	−127	13	
13	Nemzeti Kézilabda Akadémia	26	6	1	19	653	781	−128	13	Relegation to Nemzeti Bajnokság I/B
14	Kozármisleny KA	26	3	1	22	595	828	−233	7	Relegation to Nemzeti Bajnokság I/B

Updated to match(es) played on 26 May 2024. Source: mksz.hu
Rules for classification: 1) Points; 2) Goal difference; 3) Head-to-head points; 4) Head-to-head goal difference; 5) Goals scored; 6) Matches won; 7) Draw (Note: Head-to-head record is used only after all the matches between the teams in question have been played)

==== Results by round ====
Match	1	2	3	4	5	6	7	8	9	10	11	12	13	14	15	16	17	18	19	20	21	22	23	24	25	26
Ground	A	H	A	H	H	A	H	A	H	A	H	A	H	H	A	H	A	A	H	A	H	A	H	A	H	A
Result	W	W	W	W	W	L	W	W	W	W	W	L	L	W	W	W	W	W	W	W	W	W	W	W	L	L

Updated to match(es) played on 25 May 2024. Source: Matches
A = Away; H = Home; W = Win; D = Draw; L = Loss

==== Matches ====
Win Draw Loss Fixtures

Round 1; 1 September 2023; 18:00	Alba Fehérvár KC	23–31	DVSC Schaeffler	Köfém Sportcsarnok, Székesfehérvár; Attendance: 250; Referees: Szabolcs Bóna, Csaba Földei (HUN)
Round 1; 1 September 2023; 18:00	B. Kocsis 6	(11–18)	P. Vámos 7	Köfém Sportcsarnok, Székesfehérvár; Attendance: 250; Referees: Szabolcs Bóna, Csaba Földei (HUN)
Round 1; 1 September 2023; 18:00	4× (suspension)	Report	3× (suspension)	Köfém Sportcsarnok, Székesfehérvár; Attendance: 250; Referees: Szabolcs Bóna, Csaba Földei (HUN)

Round 2; 6 September 2023; 18:00	DVSC Schaeffler	31–23	Vasas SC	Hódos Imre Sports Hall, Debrecen; Attendance: 800; Referees: Ádám Héjja, Balázs Kónya (HUN)
Round 2; 6 September 2023; 18:00	Füzi-Tóvizi 6	(12–11)	Szilovics 5	Hódos Imre Sports Hall, Debrecen; Attendance: 800; Referees: Ádám Héjja, Balázs Kónya (HUN)
Round 2; 6 September 2023; 18:00	1× (yellow card) 3× (suspension)	Report	1× (yellow card) 6× (suspension)	Hódos Imre Sports Hall, Debrecen; Attendance: 800; Referees: Ádám Héjja, Balázs Kónya (HUN)

Round 3; 13 September 2023; 17:00	Nemzeti Kézilabda Akadémia	19–30	DVSC Schaeffler	NEKA Csarnok, Balatonboglár; Attendance: 200; Referees: Bence Bátori, Lantos Szécsi (HUN)
Round 3; 13 September 2023; 17:00	Győri 5	(7–12)	Kácsor, Petrus 6	NEKA Csarnok, Balatonboglár; Attendance: 200; Referees: Bence Bátori, Lantos Szécsi (HUN)
Round 3; 13 September 2023; 17:00	1× (yellow card) 1× (suspension)	Report	2× (yellow card) 2× (suspension)	NEKA Csarnok, Balatonboglár; Attendance: 200; Referees: Bence Bátori, Lantos Szécsi (HUN)

Round 4; 20 September 2023; 17:00	DVSC Schaeffler	31–19	Dunaújvárosi Kohász KA	Hódos Imre Sports Hall, Debrecen; Attendance: 770; Referees: Stefánia Kovács-Sebők, Rebeka Vastag-Réti (HUN)
Round 4; 20 September 2023; 17:00	Jovović 5	(16–7)	Paróczy 4	Hódos Imre Sports Hall, Debrecen; Attendance: 770; Referees: Stefánia Kovács-Sebők, Rebeka Vastag-Réti (HUN)
Round 4; 20 September 2023; 17:00	1× (yellow card) 1× (suspension)	Report	3× (suspension)	Hódos Imre Sports Hall, Debrecen; Attendance: 770; Referees: Stefánia Kovács-Sebők, Rebeka Vastag-Réti (HUN)

Round 5; 6 October 2023; 18:00	DVSC Schaeffler	36–24	Békéscsabai Előre NKSE	Hódos Imre Sports Hall, Debrecen; Attendance: 800; Referees: Dorina Benya-Hantos, Kamilla Kovács (HUN)
Round 5; 6 October 2023; 18:00	P. Vámos 9	(16–11)	Gyimesi 6	Hódos Imre Sports Hall, Debrecen; Attendance: 800; Referees: Dorina Benya-Hantos, Kamilla Kovács (HUN)
Round 5; 6 October 2023; 18:00	2× (yellow card) 3× (suspension)	Report	1× (yellow card) 2× (suspension)	Hódos Imre Sports Hall, Debrecen; Attendance: 800; Referees: Dorina Benya-Hantos, Kamilla Kovács (HUN)

Round 6; 18 October 2023; 18:00	Mosonmagyaróvári KC SE	30–23	DVSC Schaeffler	UFM Aréna, Mosonmagyaróvár; Attendance: 1,000; Referees: Gábor Hargitai, Gábor Markó (HUN)
Round 6; 18 October 2023; 18:00	E. Tóth 8	(14–9)	Petrus 5	UFM Aréna, Mosonmagyaróvár; Attendance: 1,000; Referees: Gábor Hargitai, Gábor Markó (HUN)
Round 6; 18 October 2023; 18:00	2× (yellow card) 5× (suspension)	Report	1× (yellow card) 7× (suspension)	UFM Aréna, Mosonmagyaróvár; Attendance: 1,000; Referees: Gábor Hargitai, Gábor Markó (HUN)

Round 7; 25 October 2023; 18:00	DVSC Schaeffler	39–29	MTK Budapest	Hódos Imre Sports Hall, Debrecen; Attendance: 600; Referees: György Sándor, Balázs Szabó (HUN)
Round 7; 25 October 2023; 18:00	Kácsor 9	(20–14)	Farkas 8	Hódos Imre Sports Hall, Debrecen; Attendance: 600; Referees: György Sándor, Balázs Szabó (HUN)
Round 7; 25 October 2023; 18:00	1× (suspension)	Report	5× (suspension)	Hódos Imre Sports Hall, Debrecen; Attendance: 600; Referees: György Sándor, Balázs Szabó (HUN)

Round 11; 1 November 2023; 18:00	DVSC Schaeffler	35–24	Moyra-Budaörs Handball	Hódos Imre Sports Hall, Debrecen; Attendance: 600; Referees: Kristóf Altmár, Márton Horváth (HUN)
Round 11; 1 November 2023; 18:00	Töpfner 7	(16–10)	Szekerczés, Uhrin 4	Hódos Imre Sports Hall, Debrecen; Attendance: 600; Referees: Kristóf Altmár, Márton Horváth (HUN)
Round 11; 1 November 2023; 18:00	7× (suspension)	Report	4× (suspension) 1× (red card)	Hódos Imre Sports Hall, Debrecen; Attendance: 600; Referees: Kristóf Altmár, Márton Horváth (HUN)

Round 8; 15 November 2023; 18:00	Váci NKSE	27–30	DVSC Schaeffler	Városi Sportcsarnok, Vác; Attendance: 500; Referees: Ferenc Felhő, Tamás Öcsi (HUN)
Round 8; 15 November 2023; 18:00	Kuczora 11	(12–14)	Hámori, P. Vámos 5	Városi Sportcsarnok, Vác; Attendance: 500; Referees: Ferenc Felhő, Tamás Öcsi (HUN)
Round 8; 15 November 2023; 18:00	3× (suspension)	Report	1× (yellow card) 4× (suspension)	Városi Sportcsarnok, Vác; Attendance: 500; Referees: Ferenc Felhő, Tamás Öcsi (HUN)

Round 10; 30 December 2023; 18:00	Kisvárdai KC	23–33	DVSC Schaeffler	Városi Sportcsarnok, Kisvárda; Attendance: 650; Referees: László Bócz, Viktor Wiedemann
Round 10; 30 December 2023; 18:00	Juhász 5	(11–18)	Töpfner 6	Városi Sportcsarnok, Kisvárda; Attendance: 650; Referees: László Bócz, Viktor Wiedemann
Round 10; 30 December 2023; 18:00	1× (yellow card) 9× (suspension) 1× (red card)	Report	1× (yellow card) 6× (suspension)	Városi Sportcsarnok, Kisvárda; Attendance: 650; Referees: László Bócz, Viktor Wiedemann

Round 9; 3 January 2024; 18:00	DVSC Schaeffler	30–23	Kozármisleny KA	Hódos Imre Sports Hall, Debrecen; Attendance: 550; Referees: Kristóf Altmár, Márton Horváth (HUN)
Round 9; 3 January 2024; 18:00	P. Vámos 5	(14–8)	Hadnagy 6	Hódos Imre Sports Hall, Debrecen; Attendance: 550; Referees: Kristóf Altmár, Márton Horváth (HUN)
Round 9; 3 January 2024; 18:00	3× (suspension)	Report	3× (suspension)	Hódos Imre Sports Hall, Debrecen; Attendance: 550; Referees: Kristóf Altmár, Márton Horváth (HUN)

Round 12; 17 January 2024; 18:00	Győri Audi ETO KC	25–23	DVSC Schaeffler	Audi Aréna, Győr; Attendance: 2,866; Referees: Ferenc Felhő, Tamás Öcsi (HUN)
Round 12; 17 January 2024; 18:00	Gros 7	(11–11)	Töpfner 6	Audi Aréna, Győr; Attendance: 2,866; Referees: Ferenc Felhő, Tamás Öcsi (HUN)
Round 12; 17 January 2024; 18:00	3× (yellow card) 4× (suspension)	Report	2× (yellow card) 3× (suspension)	Audi Aréna, Győr; Attendance: 2,866; Referees: Ferenc Felhő, Tamás Öcsi (HUN)

Round 13; 27 January 2024; 18:00	DVSC Schaeffler	21–24	FTC-Rail Cargo Hungaria	Hódos Imre Sports Hall, Debrecen; Attendance: 2,200; Referees: Péter Horváth, Balázs Marton (HUN)
Round 13; 27 January 2024; 18:00	Töpfner 6	(8–14)	Klujber 8	Hódos Imre Sports Hall, Debrecen; Attendance: 2,200; Referees: Péter Horváth, Balázs Marton (HUN)
Round 13; 27 January 2024; 18:00	5× (suspension)	Report	5× (suspension) 1× (red card)	Hódos Imre Sports Hall, Debrecen; Attendance: 2,200; Referees: Péter Horváth, Balázs Marton (HUN)

Round 14; 7 February 2024; 18:00	DVSC Schaeffler	39–27	Alba Fehérvár KC	Hódos Imre Sports Hall, Debrecen; Attendance: 800; Referees: György Sándor, Balázs Szabó (HUN)
Round 14; 7 February 2024; 18:00	Csernyánszki 8	(18–14)	Szabó 10	Hódos Imre Sports Hall, Debrecen; Attendance: 800; Referees: György Sándor, Balázs Szabó (HUN)
Round 14; 7 February 2024; 18:00	3× (yellow card) 3× (suspension)	Report	1× (yellow card) 2× (suspension)	Hódos Imre Sports Hall, Debrecen; Attendance: 800; Referees: György Sándor, Balázs Szabó (HUN)

Round 15; 14 February 2024; 17:00	Vasas SC	22–32	DVSC Schaeffler	Sterbinszky Amália Kézilabdacsarnok, Budapest; Attendance: 400; Referees: Ferenc Nagy, József Túróczy (HUN)
Round 15; 14 February 2024; 17:00	Boldizsár 4	(10–16)	M. Vámos 6	Sterbinszky Amália Kézilabdacsarnok, Budapest; Attendance: 400; Referees: Ferenc Nagy, József Túróczy (HUN)
Round 15; 14 February 2024; 17:00	5× (suspension)	Report	2× (yellow card) 6× (suspension)	Sterbinszky Amália Kézilabdacsarnok, Budapest; Attendance: 400; Referees: Ferenc Nagy, József Túróczy (HUN)

Round 16; 23 February 2024; 18:00	DVSC Schaeffler	32–29	Nemzeti Kézilabda Akadémia	Hódos Imre Sports Hall, Debrecen; Attendance: 900; Referees: Bence Asztalos, Zoltán Szalay (HUN)
Round 16; 23 February 2024; 18:00	P. Vámos 10	(15–16)	Faragó 6	Hódos Imre Sports Hall, Debrecen; Attendance: 900; Referees: Bence Asztalos, Zoltán Szalay (HUN)
Round 16; 23 February 2024; 18:00	2× (yellow card) 5× (suspension)	Report	3× (suspension)	Hódos Imre Sports Hall, Debrecen; Attendance: 900; Referees: Bence Asztalos, Zoltán Szalay (HUN)

Round 17; 20 March 2024; 17:00	Dunaújvárosi Kohász KA	28–38	DVSC Schaeffler	Városi Sportcsarnok, Dunaújváros; Attendance: 200; Referees: György Sándor, Balázs Szabó (HUN)
Round 17; 20 March 2024; 17:00	Paróczy 8	(12–18)	Töpfner 8	Városi Sportcsarnok, Dunaújváros; Attendance: 200; Referees: György Sándor, Balázs Szabó (HUN)
Round 17; 20 March 2024; 17:00	5× (suspension)	Report	1× (yellow card) 4× (suspension)	Városi Sportcsarnok, Dunaújváros; Attendance: 200; Referees: György Sándor, Balázs Szabó (HUN)

Round 18; 27 March 2024; 18:00	Békéscsabai Előre NKSE	25–32	DVSC Schaeffler	Városi Sportcsarnok, Békéscsaba; Attendance: 750; Referees: Stefánia Kovács-Sebők, Rebeka Vastag-Réti (HUN)
Round 18; 27 March 2024; 18:00	Román 6	(13–16)	Töpfner 8	Városi Sportcsarnok, Békéscsaba; Attendance: 750; Referees: Stefánia Kovács-Sebők, Rebeka Vastag-Réti (HUN)
Round 18; 27 March 2024; 18:00	1× (yellow card) 4× (suspension) 0× (red card)	Report	1× (yellow card) 4× (suspension) 0× (red card)	Városi Sportcsarnok, Békéscsaba; Attendance: 750; Referees: Stefánia Kovács-Sebők, Rebeka Vastag-Réti (HUN)

Round 19; 21 April 2024; 18:00	DVSC Schaeffler	33–27	Mosonmagyaróvári KC SE	Hódos Imre Sports Hall, Debrecen; Attendance: 1,300; Referees: László Bócz, Viktor Wiedemann (HUN)
Round 19; 21 April 2024; 18:00	Petrus 7	(16–15)	G. Tóth 6	Hódos Imre Sports Hall, Debrecen; Attendance: 1,300; Referees: László Bócz, Viktor Wiedemann (HUN)
Round 19; 21 April 2024; 18:00	2× (suspension)	Report	6× (suspension)	Hódos Imre Sports Hall, Debrecen; Attendance: 1,300; Referees: László Bócz, Viktor Wiedemann (HUN)

Round 20; 27 April 2024; 15:30	MTK Budapest	27–36	DVSC Schaeffler	Riz Levente Sport és Rendvezvény Központ, Budapest; Attendance: 350; Referees: Miklós Andorka, Róbert Hucker (HUN)
Round 20; 27 April 2024; 15:30	Farkas 8	(16–20)	Petrus 9	Riz Levente Sport és Rendvezvény Központ, Budapest; Attendance: 350; Referees: Miklós Andorka, Róbert Hucker (HUN)
Round 20; 27 April 2024; 15:30	2× (suspension)	Report	1× (yellow card) 4× (suspension)	Riz Levente Sport és Rendvezvény Központ, Budapest; Attendance: 350; Referees: Miklós Andorka, Róbert Hucker (HUN)

Round 23; 1 May 2024; 18:00	DVSC Schaeffler	33–19	Kisvárdai KC	Hódos Imre Sports Hall, Debrecen; Attendance: 850; Referees: Ferenc Felhő, Tamás Öcsi (HUN)
Round 23; 1 May 2024; 18:00	N. Szabó 5	(18–8)	Juhász 5	Hódos Imre Sports Hall, Debrecen; Attendance: 850; Referees: Ferenc Felhő, Tamás Öcsi (HUN)
Round 23; 1 May 2024; 18:00	2× (suspension)	Report	4× (suspension)	Hódos Imre Sports Hall, Debrecen; Attendance: 850; Referees: Ferenc Felhő, Tamás Öcsi (HUN)

Round 21; 5 May 2024; 18:00	DVSC Schaeffler	32–24	Váci NKSE	Hódos Imre Sports Hall, Debrecen; Attendance: 800; Referees: G. Hargitai, G. Markó (HUN)
Round 21; 5 May 2024; 18:00	Füzi-Tóvizi, Petrus 5	(19–11)	four players 4	Hódos Imre Sports Hall, Debrecen; Attendance: 800; Referees: G. Hargitai, G. Markó (HUN)
Round 21; 5 May 2024; 18:00	1× (yellow card) 3× (suspension)	Report	2× (yellow card) 2× (suspension)	Hódos Imre Sports Hall, Debrecen; Attendance: 800; Referees: G. Hargitai, G. Markó (HUN)

Round 22; 11 May 2024; 18:00	Kozármisleny KA	21–37	DVSC Schaeffler	Városi Sportcsarnok, Kozármisleny; Attendance: 500; Referees: Dániel Puska, Sámuel Vastag (HUN)
Round 22; 11 May 2024; 18:00	Brettner, Zsemberi 4	(10–20)	P. Vámos 6	Városi Sportcsarnok, Kozármisleny; Attendance: 500; Referees: Dániel Puska, Sámuel Vastag (HUN)
Round 22; 11 May 2024; 18:00	4× (suspension)	Report	4× (suspension)	Városi Sportcsarnok, Kozármisleny; Attendance: 500; Referees: Dániel Puska, Sámuel Vastag (HUN)

Round 24; 18 May 2024; 17:00	Moyra-Budaörs Handball	26–37	DVSC Schaeffler	Városi Sportcsarnok Budaörs, Budaörs; Attendance: 450; Referees: Stefánia Kovács-Sebők, Rebeka Vastag-Réti (HUN)
Round 24; 18 May 2024; 17:00	Szövérdffy-Szabadfi, Gorilska	(16–17)	N. Szabó 5	Városi Sportcsarnok Budaörs, Budaörs; Attendance: 450; Referees: Stefánia Kovács-Sebők, Rebeka Vastag-Réti (HUN)
Round 24; 18 May 2024; 17:00	2× (suspension)	Report	1× (yellow card) 2× (suspension)	Városi Sportcsarnok Budaörs, Budaörs; Attendance: 450; Referees: Stefánia Kovács-Sebők, Rebeka Vastag-Réti (HUN)

Round 25; 22 May 2024; 18:00	DVSC Schaeffler	30–31	Győri Audi ETO KC	Hódos Imre Sports Hall, Debrecen; Attendance: 2,200; Referees: Kristóf Altmár, Márton Horváth (HUN)
Round 25; 22 May 2024; 18:00	Füzi-Tóvizi 7	(12–14)	Gros 9	Hódos Imre Sports Hall, Debrecen; Attendance: 2,200; Referees: Kristóf Altmár, Márton Horváth (HUN)
Round 25; 22 May 2024; 18:00	3× (suspension)	Report	1× (yellow card) 7× (suspension)	Hódos Imre Sports Hall, Debrecen; Attendance: 2,200; Referees: Kristóf Altmár, Márton Horváth (HUN)

Round 26; 25 May 2024; 17:30	FTC-Rail Cargo Hungaria	33–29	DVSC Schaeffler	Elek Gyula Aréna, Budapest; Attendance: 1,200; Referees: Ferenc Nagy, József Túróczy (HUN)
Round 26; 25 May 2024; 17:30	Klujber 9	(14–15)	Planéta, Kácsor 5	Elek Gyula Aréna, Budapest; Attendance: 1,200; Referees: Ferenc Nagy, József Túróczy (HUN)
Round 26; 25 May 2024; 17:30	2× (yellow card) 1× (suspension)	Report	2× (yellow card) 1× (suspension)	Elek Gyula Aréna, Budapest; Attendance: 1,200; Referees: Ferenc Nagy, József Túróczy (HUN)

==== Results overview ====
All results are indicated from the perspective of DVSC Schaeffler.
We indicate in parentheses the number of round.
Win Draw Loss Postponed

Opposition	Home score	Away score	Aggregate score	Double
Alba Fehérvár KC	39–27 (14)	31–23 (1)	70–50	Yes
Eubility Group Békéscsabai Előre NKSE	36–24 (5)	32–25 (18)	68–49	Yes
Moyra-Budaörs Handball	35–24 (11)	37–26 (24)	72–50	Yes
Dunaújvárosi Kohász KA	31–19 (4)	38–28 (17)	69–47	Yes
Győri ETO KC	30–31 (25)	23–25 (12)	53–56	No
FTC-Rail Cargo Hungaria	21–24 (13)	29–33 (26)	50–57	No
Kisvárda Master Good SE	33–19 (23)	33–23 (10)	66–42	Yes
Kozármisleny KA	30–23 (9)	37–21 (22)	67–44	Yes
Motherson-Mosonmagyaróvár	33–27 (19)	23–30 (6)	56–57	No
MTK Budapest	39–29 (7)	36–27 (20)	75–56	Yes
Nemzeti Kézilabda Akadémia	32–29 (16)	30–19 (3)	62–48	Yes
Vasas SC	31–23 (2)	32–22 (15)	63–45	Yes
Praktiker-Vác	32–24 (21)	30–27 (8)	62–51	Yes

=== Hungarian Cup ===
==== Round 4 ====
10 January 2024; 18:00	Váci NKSE	26–26 (a)	DVSC Schaeffler	Városi Sportcsarnok, Vác; Attendance: 550; Referees: Gábor Kiu G., Tamás Kiu (HUN)
10 January 2024; 18:00	Kuczora 9	(15–13)	P. Vámos 7	Városi Sportcsarnok, Vác; Attendance: 550; Referees: Gábor Kiu G., Tamás Kiu (HUN)
10 January 2024; 18:00	3× (suspension)	Report	2× (yellow card) 6× (suspension) 1× (red card)	Városi Sportcsarnok, Vác; Attendance: 550; Referees: Gábor Kiu G., Tamás Kiu (HUN)

==== Quarter-final ====
31 January 2024; 17:00	Dunaújvárosi Kohász KA	23–36	DVSC Schaeffler	Városi Sportcsarnok, Dunaújváros; Attendance: 250; Referees: Gábor Hargitai, Gábor Markó (HUN)
31 January 2024; 17:00	Kopecz 5	(12–16)	Töpfner 10	Városi Sportcsarnok, Dunaújváros; Attendance: 250; Referees: Gábor Hargitai, Gábor Markó (HUN)
31 January 2024; 17:00	1× (yellow card) 2× (suspension)	Report	2× (yellow card) 7× (suspension)	Városi Sportcsarnok, Dunaújváros; Attendance: 250; Referees: Gábor Hargitai, Gábor Markó (HUN)

==== Final four ====
Draw date: 5 February 2024

9 March 2024; Semi-final 15:00	Győri ETO KC	29–28	DVSC Schaeffler	Tatabányai Multifunkcionális Sportcsarnok, Tatabánya; Attendance: 3,000; Referees: Gábor Hargitai, Gábor Markó (HUN)
9 March 2024; Semi-final 15:00	Brattset, Kristiansen 6	(16–12)	Töpfner 6	Tatabányai Multifunkcionális Sportcsarnok, Tatabánya; Attendance: 3,000; Referees: Gábor Hargitai, Gábor Markó (HUN)
9 March 2024; Semi-final 15:00	1× (yellow card) 2× (suspension)	Report	2× (yellow card) 2× (suspension)	Tatabányai Multifunkcionális Sportcsarnok, Tatabánya; Attendance: 3,000; Referees: Gábor Hargitai, Gábor Markó (HUN)

10 March 2024; Bronze match 15:00	DVSC Schaeffler	34–29	Mosonmagyaróvári KC SE	Tatabányai Multifunkcionális Sportcsarnok, Tatabánya; Attendance: 3,000; Referees: Dániel Paska, Sámuel Vastag (HUN)
10 March 2024; Bronze match 15:00	N. Szabó 7	(16–15)	E. Tóth 8	Tatabányai Multifunkcionális Sportcsarnok, Tatabánya; Attendance: 3,000; Referees: Dániel Paska, Sámuel Vastag (HUN)
10 March 2024; Bronze match 15:00	1× (yellow card) 5× (suspension)	Report	3× (suspension)	Tatabányai Multifunkcionális Sportcsarnok, Tatabánya; Attendance: 3,000; Referees: Dániel Paska, Sámuel Vastag (HUN)

=== EHF Champions League ===
==== Group stage ====
Pos	Team	Pld	W	D	L	GF	GA	GD	Pts	Qualification	GYO	ODE	BRE	BUC	DEB	BIE	BUD	SÄV
1	(Hungary) Győri Audi ETO KC	14	11	1	2	432	356	+76	23	Quarterfinals	—	32–29	32–32	24–26	35–23	31–29	37–19	39–20
2	(Denmark) Odense Håndbold	14	10	1	3	461	359	+102	21	Quarterfinals	30–31	—	29–29	29–25	33–30	42–29	39–24	40–22
3	(France) Brest Bretagne Handball	14	7	3	4	399	367	+32	17 (Note: Brest 54–49 București)	Playoffs	23–24	25–26	—	24–21	38–28	37–30	20–20	28–23
4	(Romania) CSM București	14	8	1	5	414	366	+48	17	Playoffs	23–27	28–24	28–30	—	29–29	31–28	44–26	35–26
5	(Hungary) DVSC Schaeffler	14	7	1	6	394	414	−20	15	Playoffs	29–28	22–35	31–24	23–30	—	26–36	27–22	32–29
6	(Germany) SG BBM Bietigheim	14	7	0	7	414	402	+12	14	Playoffs	26–34	25–28	34–30	26–24	27–31	—	34–16	30–21
7	(Montenegro) WHC Budućnost BEMAX	14	2	1	11	311	433	−122	5		21–29	17–33	21–34	24–29	21–27	22–27	—	31–30
8	(Sweden) IK Sävehof	14	0	0	14	342	470	−128	0		26–29	20–22	20–25	26–41	27–36	29–33	23–27	—

Source: EHF
Rules for classification: Tiebreakers

===== Matches =====
9 September 2023; 18:00	DVSC Schaeffler	32–29	Sävehof (Sweden)	Hódos Imre Sports Hall, Debrecen; Attendance: 1,500; Referees: Ozren Backovic, Mirko Palackovic (SLO)
9 September 2023; 18:00	P. Vámos 6	(18–13)	four players 5	Hódos Imre Sports Hall, Debrecen; Attendance: 1,500; Referees: Ozren Backovic, Mirko Palackovic (SLO)
9 September 2023; 18:00	1× (yellow card) 4× (suspension)	Report	5× (suspension)	Hódos Imre Sports Hall, Debrecen; Attendance: 1,500; Referees: Ozren Backovic, Mirko Palackovic (SLO)

16 September 2023; 16:00	Győri Audi ETO (Hungary)	35–23	DVSC Schaeffler	Audi Arena, Győr; Attendance: 3,094; Referees: Vanja Antić, Jelena Jakovljević (SRB)
16 September 2023; 16:00	Hovden 6	(14–10)	Jovović, Csernyánszki 4	Audi Arena, Győr; Attendance: 3,094; Referees: Vanja Antić, Jelena Jakovljević (SRB)
16 September 2023; 16:00	3× (suspension)	Report	1× (yellow card) 3× (suspension)	Audi Arena, Győr; Attendance: 3,094; Referees: Vanja Antić, Jelena Jakovljević (SRB)

24 September 2023; 14:00	DVSC Schaeffler	26–36	Bietigheim (Germany)	Hódos Imre Sports Hall, Debrecen; Attendance: 2,000; Referees: Andrej Budzák, Michal Záhradník (SVK)
24 September 2023; 14:00	Töpfner 5	(12–18)	Smits 8	Hódos Imre Sports Hall, Debrecen; Attendance: 2,000; Referees: Andrej Budzák, Michal Záhradník (SVK)
24 September 2023; 14:00	9× (suspension)	Report	1× (yellow card) 6× (suspension)	Hódos Imre Sports Hall, Debrecen; Attendance: 2,000; Referees: Andrej Budzák, Michal Záhradník (SVK)

30 September 2023; 16:00	Odense (Denmark)	33–30	DVSC Schaeffler	Sydbank Arena Odense, Odense; Attendance: 1,987; Referees: Eskil Braseth, Leif Andre Sundet (NOR)
30 September 2023; 16:00	Aardahl 7	(17–14)	Kácsor 10	Sydbank Arena Odense, Odense; Attendance: 1,987; Referees: Eskil Braseth, Leif Andre Sundet (NOR)
30 September 2023; 16:00	1× (yellow card) 6× (suspension) 1× (red card)	Report	1× (yellow card) 6× (suspension)	Sydbank Arena Odense, Odense; Attendance: 1,987; Referees: Eskil Braseth, Leif Andre Sundet (NOR)

21 October 2023; 16:00	DVSC Schaeffler	27–22	Budućnost (Montenegro)	Hódos Imre Sports Hall, Debrecen; Attendance: 1,700; Referees: V. A. Konjicanin, D. Konjicanin (BIH)
21 October 2023; 16:00	Töpfner 10	(12–10)	three players 5	Hódos Imre Sports Hall, Debrecen; Attendance: 1,700; Referees: V. A. Konjicanin, D. Konjicanin (BIH)
21 October 2023; 16:00	1× (yellow card) 4× (suspension)	Report	1× (yellow card) 7× (suspension)	Hódos Imre Sports Hall, Debrecen; Attendance: 1,700; Referees: V. A. Konjicanin, D. Konjicanin (BIH)

28 October 2023; 16:00	DVSC Schaeffler	31–24	Brest Bretagne (France)	Hódos Imre Sports Hall, Debrecen; Attendance: 1,500; Referees: Igor Covalciuc, Alexei Covalciuc (MDA)
28 October 2023; 16:00	Töpfner 7	(15–14)	Maslova 9	Hódos Imre Sports Hall, Debrecen; Attendance: 1,500; Referees: Igor Covalciuc, Alexei Covalciuc (MDA)
28 October 2023; 16:00	1× (yellow card) 4× (suspension)	Report	1× (suspension)	Hódos Imre Sports Hall, Debrecen; Attendance: 1,500; Referees: Igor Covalciuc, Alexei Covalciuc (MDA)

11 November 2023; 18:00	CSM București (Romania)	29–29	DVSC Schaeffler	Sala Polivalentă, Bucharest; Attendance: 2,500; Referees: Yann Carmaux, Julien Mursch (FRA)
11 November 2023; 18:00	Neagu 9	(17–14)	P. Vámos 7	Sala Polivalentă, Bucharest; Attendance: 2,500; Referees: Yann Carmaux, Julien Mursch (FRA)
11 November 2023; 18:00	3× (suspension)	Report	2× (suspension)	Sala Polivalentă, Bucharest; Attendance: 2,500; Referees: Yann Carmaux, Julien Mursch (FRA)

18 November 2023; 16:00	DVSC Schaeffler	23–30	CSM București (Romania)	Hódos Imre Sports Hall, Debrecen; Attendance: 2,200; Referees: Pinar Ünlü Hatipoglu, Mehtap Simsek (TUR)
18 November 2023; 16:00	Planéta 6	(9–15)	Stoica 8	Hódos Imre Sports Hall, Debrecen; Attendance: 2,200; Referees: Pinar Ünlü Hatipoglu, Mehtap Simsek (TUR)
18 November 2023; 16:00	1× (yellow card) 4× (suspension)	Report	1× (yellow card) 5× (suspension)	Hódos Imre Sports Hall, Debrecen; Attendance: 2,200; Referees: Pinar Ünlü Hatipoglu, Mehtap Simsek (TUR)

6 January 2024; 18:00	Brest Bretagne (France)	38–28	DVSC Schaeffler	Brest Arena, Brest; Attendance: 4,152; Referees: Gianna Stella Merisi, Andrea Alejandra Pepe (ITA)
6 January 2024; 18:00	Cabral Barbosa 9	(19–14)	four players 4	Brest Arena, Brest; Attendance: 4,152; Referees: Gianna Stella Merisi, Andrea Alejandra Pepe (ITA)
6 January 2024; 18:00	2× (suspension)	Report	3× (suspension)	Brest Arena, Brest; Attendance: 4,152; Referees: Gianna Stella Merisi, Andrea Alejandra Pepe (ITA)

14 January 2024; 16:00	Budućnost (Montenegro)	21–27	DVSC Schaeffler	Bemax Arena, Podgorica; Attendance: 1,020; Referees: Javier Álvarez, Yon Bustamante (ESP)
14 January 2024; 16:00	Niakate 8	(11-11)	Kácsor 9	Bemax Arena, Podgorica; Attendance: 1,020; Referees: Javier Álvarez, Yon Bustamante (ESP)
14 January 2024; 16:00	3× (suspension)	Report	1× (yellow card) 1× (suspension)	Bemax Arena, Podgorica; Attendance: 1,020; Referees: Javier Álvarez, Yon Bustamante (ESP)

20 January 2024; 16:00	DVSC Schaeffler	22–35	Odense (Denmark)	Hódos Imre Sports Hall, Debrecen; Attendance: 2,000; Referees: Ana Vranes, Marlis Wenninger (AUT)
20 January 2024; 16:00	Kácsor 9	(12–15)	Højlund 7	Hódos Imre Sports Hall, Debrecen; Attendance: 2,000; Referees: Ana Vranes, Marlis Wenninger (AUT)
20 January 2024; 16:00	2× (yellow card) 3× (suspension)	Report	2× (suspension)	Hódos Imre Sports Hall, Debrecen; Attendance: 2,000; Referees: Ana Vranes, Marlis Wenninger (AUT)

4 February 2024; 14:00	Bietigheim (Germany)	27–31	DVSC Schaeffler	MHPArena, Ludwigsburg; Attendance: 2,800; Referees: Marija Ilieva, Silvana Karbeska (MKD)
4 February 2024; 14:00	Döll 9	(15–13)	Kácsor 7	MHPArena, Ludwigsburg; Attendance: 2,800; Referees: Marija Ilieva, Silvana Karbeska (MKD)
4 February 2024; 14:00	2× (suspension)	Report	1× (yellow card) 2× (suspension)	MHPArena, Ludwigsburg; Attendance: 2,800; Referees: Marija Ilieva, Silvana Karbeska (MKD)

10 February 2024; 18:00	DVSC Schaeffler	29–28	Győri Audi ETO (Hungary)	Hódos Imre Sports Hall, Debrecen; Attendance: 2,100; Referees: Tatjana Prastalo, Vesna Balvan (BIH)
10 February 2024; 18:00	Jovović 5	(14–14)	Nze Minko 6	Hódos Imre Sports Hall, Debrecen; Attendance: 2,100; Referees: Tatjana Prastalo, Vesna Balvan (BIH)
10 February 2024; 18:00	2× (yellow card) 1× (suspension)	Report	1× (yellow card) 3× (suspension)	Hódos Imre Sports Hall, Debrecen; Attendance: 2,100; Referees: Tatjana Prastalo, Vesna Balvan (BIH)

18 February 2024; 16:00	Sävehof (Sweden)	27–36	DVSC Schaeffler	Partille Arena, Partille; Attendance: 428; Referees: Přemysl, Mohyla (CZE)
18 February 2024; 16:00	Stankiewicz 12	(14–18)	Töpfner 8	Partille Arena, Partille; Attendance: 428; Referees: Přemysl, Mohyla (CZE)
18 February 2024; 16:00	5× (suspension)	Report	7× (suspension)	Partille Arena, Partille; Attendance: 428; Referees: Přemysl, Mohyla (CZE)

==== Results overview ====
Opposition	Home score	Away score	Double
(Romania) CSM București	23–30	29–29	52–59
(Hungary) Győri ETO KC	29–28	35–23	52–63
(Sweden) IK Sävehof	32–29	27–36	68–56
(Denmark) Odense Håndbold	22–35	33–30	52–68
(France) Brest Bretagne Handball	31–24	38–28	59–62
(Montenegro) ŽRK Budućnost Podgorica	27–22	21–27	54–43
(Germany) SG BBM Bietigheim	26–36	27–31	57–63

==== Playoff ====
17 March 2024; 14:00	DVSC Schaeffler	28–29	Vipers Kristiansand (Norway)	Hódos Imre Sports Hall, Debrecen; Attendance: 2,000; Referees: Cristina Lovin, Simona Raluca Stancu (ROU)
17 March 2024; 14:00	N. Szabó 6	(16–16)	Abbingh 13	Hódos Imre Sports Hall, Debrecen; Attendance: 2,000; Referees: Cristina Lovin, Simona Raluca Stancu (ROU)
17 March 2024; 14:00	2× (yellow card) 5× (suspension)	Report	2× (yellow card) 5× (suspension)	Hódos Imre Sports Hall, Debrecen; Attendance: 2,000; Referees: Cristina Lovin, Simona Raluca Stancu (ROU)

23 March 2024; 18:00	Vipers Kristiansand (Norway)	27–27	DVSC Schaeffler	Aquarama Kristiansand, Kristiansand; Attendance: 1,721; Referees: Karim Gasmi, Raouf Gasmi (FRA)
23 March 2024; 18:00	Vyakhireva 10	(10–15)	N. Szabó 8	Aquarama Kristiansand, Kristiansand; Attendance: 1,721; Referees: Karim Gasmi, Raouf Gasmi (FRA)
23 March 2024; 18:00	1× (yellow card) 3× (suspension)	Report	1× (yellow card) 2× (suspension)	Aquarama Kristiansand, Kristiansand; Attendance: 1,721; Referees: Karim Gasmi, Raouf Gasmi (FRA)

Vipers Kristiansand won 56–55 on aggregate.

== Statistics ==
=== Appearances and goals ===
Includes all competitive matches. The list is sorted by jersey number when total goals are equal.
Last updated on 25 May 2024

No.	Pos	Nat	Player	Total		Hungarian League		Hungarian Cup		EHF Champions League	
No.	Pos	Nat	Player	Apps	Goals	Apps	Goals	Apps	Goals	Apps	Goals
28	RW	(Hungary) HUN	Alexandra Töpfner	44	186	24	94	4	21	16	71
44	LB	(Hungary) HUN	Gréta Kácsor	46	180	26	92	4	19	16	69
38	CB	(Hungary) HUN	Petra Vámos	44	166	25	96	4	14	15	56
71	LW	(Hungary) HUN	Mirtill Petrus	41	111	24	77	3	8	14	26
13	LP	(Hungary) HUN	Petra Füzi-Tóvizi	46	98	26	66	4	12	16	20
24	LW	(Hungary) HUN	Míra Vámos	42	89	25	61	4	4	13	24
25	CB	(Hungary) HUN	Liliána Csernyánszki	42	88	23	56	4	6	15	26
43	RB	(Hungary) HUN	Szimonetta Planéta	43	88	26	50	3	7	14	31
5	RB	(Hungary) HUN	Konszuéla Hámori	32	83	14	39	2	10	16	34
18	RW	(Hungary) HUN	Vivien Grosch	40	83	25	64	3	2	12	17
22	LB	(Serbia) SRB	Jovana Jovović	44	82	24	40	4	9	16	33
81	CB	(Hungary) HUN	Nina Szabó	17	53	12	28	2	7	3	18
55	LP	(Netherlands) NED	Tamara Haggerty	45	48	25	28	4	5	16	15
7	RB	(Sweden) SWE	Elinore Johansson	38	15	24	11	4	0	10	4
88	RW	(Brazil) BRA	Mariana Costa	12	13	7	9	0	0	5	4
83	CB	(Hungary) HUN	Dorina Kelemen	10	8	8	8	0	0	2	0
92	LB	(Hungary) HUN	Dóra Hornyák	28	5	17	4	4	0	7	1
29	RB	(Hungary) HUN	Nóra Nagy	2	4	2	4	0	0	0	0
31	RW	(Hungary) HUN	Csenge Kiss	3	3	2	3	1	0	0	0
16	GK_	(Croatia) CRO	Gabrijela Bartulović	46	2	26	2	4	0	16	0
35	CB	(Hungary) HUN	Lili Csamangó	2	1	2	1	0	0	0	0
94	GK_	(France) FRA	Catherine Gabriel	46	0	26	0	4	0	16	0
9	LP	(Hungary) HUN	Kata Juhász	0	0	0	0	0	0	0	0

=== Match statistics ===
Last updated on 11 November 2023.

Date	Match	Team	Statistics													
Date	Match	Team	Goals	Shots				Saves		T.O.	R.T.F.	colspan="3 in (0.076 m)etres	2 m.	S.		
Date	Match	Team	Goals	Tot.	%	SoG	%	S./SoG	%	T.O.	R.T.F.	Gi.	2 m.	S.	Go.	%
01.09.2023	NB I 1.	Székesfehérvár	23	50	46%	40	80%	13/35	37%	6	3	3	2	67%	4	
01.09.2023	NB I 1.	DVSC	31	53	58%	35	66%	17/40	43%	3	2	3	3	100%	3	
06.09.2023	NB I 2.	DVSC	31	51	61%	42	82%	12/35	34%	5	2	4	4	100%	3	
06.09.2023	NB I 2.	Vasas	23	42	55%	35	83%	13/42	31%	13	5	4	4	100%	6	
09.09.2023	EHF CL; Gr 1.	DVSC	32	52	62%	44	85%	8/37	22%	7	6	2	2	100%	4	
09.09.2023	EHF CL; Gr 1.	Sävehof (Sweden)	29	47	62%	37	79%	12/44	27%	17	13	3	2	67%	5	
13.09.2023	NB I 3.	NEKA	19	30	63%	24	80%	11/41	27%	19	8	1	1	100%	1	
13.09.2023	NB I 3.	DVSC	30	44	68%	41	93%	5/24	21%	5	9	1	1	100%	2	
16.09.2023	EHF CL; Gr 2.	Győri ETO (Hungary)	35	47	74%	43	91%	12/35	34%	6	10	6	5	83%	3	
16.09.2023	EHF CL; Gr 2.	DVSC	23	43	53%	35	81%	8/43	19%	10	13	2	2	100%	3	
20.09.2023	NB I 4.	DVSC	31	46	67%	38	83%	18/37	49%	2	12	2	2	100%	1	
20.09.2023	NB I 4.	Dunaújváros	19	46	41%	37	80%	7/38	18%	7	5	2	1	50%	3	
24.09.2023	EHF CL; Gr 3.	DVSC	26	48	54%	37	88%	4/40	10%	13	10	7	5	71%	9	
24.09.2023	EHF CL; Gr 3.	Bietigheim (Germany)	36	44	82%	40	95%	11/37	30%	21	16	8	8	100%	6	
30.09.2023	EHF CL; Gr 4.	Odense (Denmark)	33	44	75%	39	91%	10/40	25%	22	14	4	3	75%	6	
30.09.2023	EHF CL; Gr 4.	DVSC	30	53	57%	40	91%	6/39	15%	11	8	1	1	100%	6	
06.10.2023	NB I 5.	DVSC	36	55	65%	48	87%	21/44	47%	6	3	3	3	100%	3	
06.10.2023	NB I 5.	Békéscsaba	24	51	47%	44	86%	12/48	25%	8	4	2	2	100%	2	
18.10.2023	NB I 6.	Mosonmagyaróvár	30	45	67%	40	89%	13/36	37%	6	8	4	4	100%	5	
18.10.2023	NB I 6.	DVSC	23	47	49%	36	77%	10/40	25%	6	7	7	3	43%	7	
21.10.2023	EHF CL; Gr 5.	DVSC	27	46	59%	37	80%	10/32	31%	12	10	8	8	100%	4	
21.10.2023	EHF CL; Gr 5.	Budućnost (Montenegro)	22	40	55%	32	80%	10/37	27%	18	15	4	2	50%	7	
25.10.2023	NB I 7.	DVSC	39	57	68%	49	86%	11/40	28%	4	2	6	3	50%	1	
25.10.2023	NB I 7.	MTK	29	48	60%	40	83%	10/49	20%	7	2	4	4	100%	5	
28.10.2023	EHF CL; Gr 6.	DVSC	31	46	67%	40	87%	11/35	31%	6	6	5	5	100%	4	
28.10.2023	EHF CL; Gr 6.	Brest Bretagne (France)	24	42	57%	35	83%	9/40	22%	12	11	5	3	60%	1	
01.11.2023	NB I 11.	DVSC	35	49	71%	41	84%	10/34	29%	9	8	8	7	88%	7	
01.11.2023	NB I 11.	Moyra-Budaörs Handball	24	44	55%	34	77%	6/41	15%	12	10	3	4	75%	5	
11.11.2023	EHF CL; Gr 7.	CSM București (Romania)	29	46	63%	40	87%	13/42	31%	14	11	2	2	100%	3	
11.11.2023	EHF CL; Gr 7.	DVSC	29	49	59%	42	86%	11/40	28%	12	9	6	3	50%	2	

=== Attendances ===
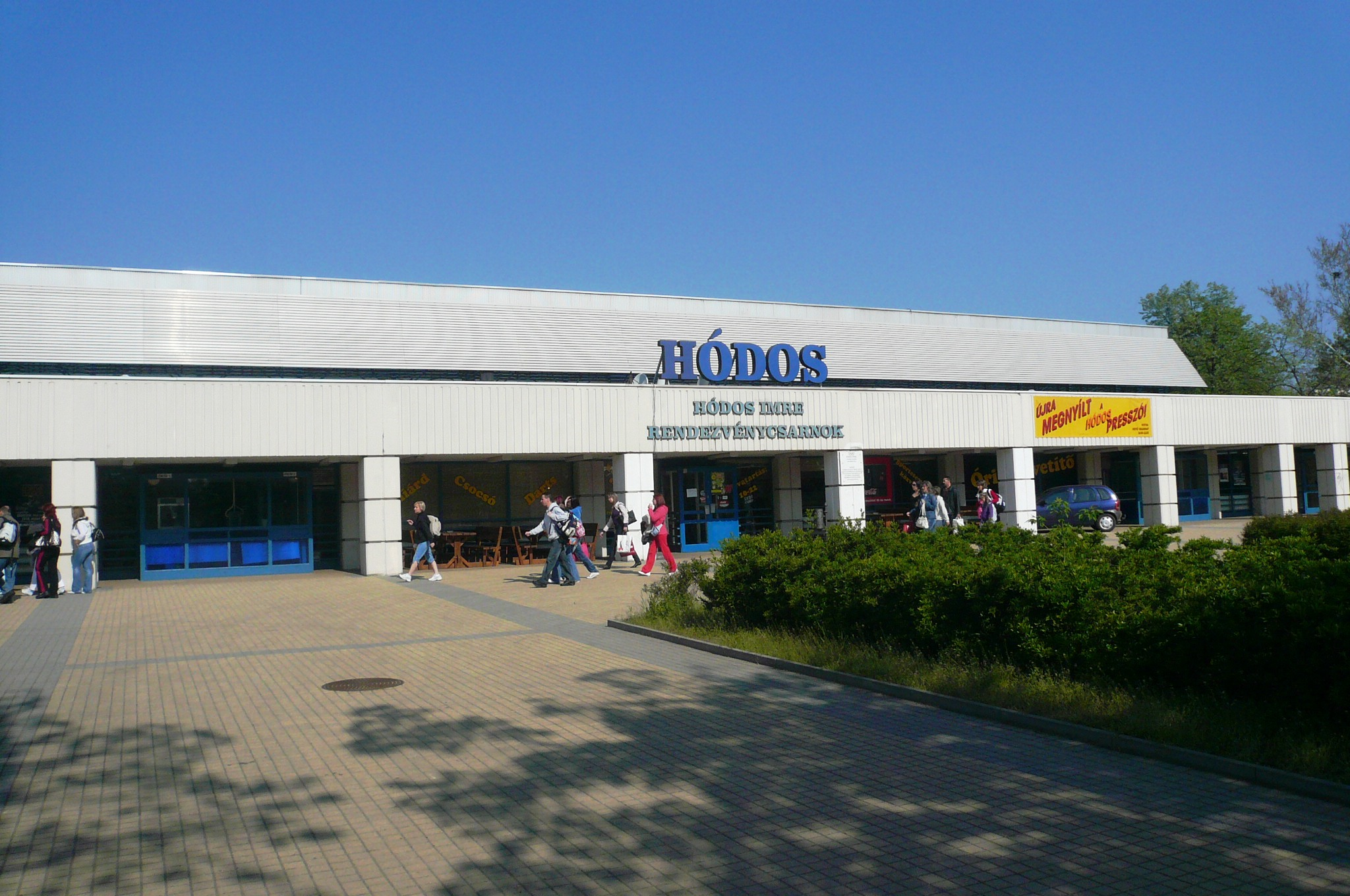
Home hall: Hódos Imre Sports Hall

List of the home matches:

Round	Against	Attendance	Capatility	Date
NB I–2.	Vasas	800	35%	06.09.2023
CL (GS)–1.	Sävehof (Sweden)	1,500	67%	09.09.2023
NB I–4.	Dunaújváros	770	34%	20.09.2023
CL (GS)–3.	Bietigheim (Germany)	2,000	89%	24.09.2023
NB I–5.	Békéscsaba	800	36%	06.10.2023
CL (GS)–5.	Buducnost (Montenegro)	1,700	76%	21.10.2023
NB I–7.	MTK	600	27%	25.10.2023
CL (GS)–6.	Brest (France)	1,500	67%	28.10.2023
NB I–11.	Moyra-Budaörs Handball	700	31%	01.11.2023
CL (GS)–8.	Bucharest (Romania)	2,200	98%	18.11.2023
NB I–9.	Kozármisleny	550	24%	03.01.2024
CL (GS)–11.	Odense (Denmark)	2,000	89%	20.01.2024
NB I–13.	Ferencváros	2,200	98%	27.01.2024
NB I–14.	Székesfehérvár	800	36%	07.02.2024
CL (GS)–13.	Győr (Hungary)	2,100	93%	10.02.2024
NB I–16.	NEKA	900	40%	23.02.2024
CL (Playoff)	Vipers Kristiansand (Norway)	2,000	89%	17.03.2024
NB I–18.	Mosonmagyaróvár	1,300	58%	21.04.2024
NB I–23.	Kisvárda	850	38%	01.05.2024
NB I–21.	Vác	800	36%	05.05.2024
NB I–25.	Győr	2,200	98%	22.05.2024

==== Attendances from season to season ====
Includes all competitive matches.
Last updated on 22 May 2024

Season	Hungarian League				Hungarian Cup				European League				Total			
Season	Total A.	M.	Av. A.	%	Total A.	M.	Av. A.	%	Total A.	M.	Av. A.	%	Total A.	M.	Av. A.	%
2023–24	13,270	13	1,021	-17%	0	0	0	—	15,000	8	1,875	-3%	28,270	21	1,346	+2%
2022–23	16,000	13	1,231	+11%	2,000	2	1,000	-44%	5,800	3	1,933	+7%	23,800	18	1,322	+10%
2021–22	14,400	13	1,108	—	1,800	1	1,800	—	1,800	1	1,800	—	18,000	15	1,200	—
