= 2021–22 Debreceni VSC (women's handball) season =

DVSC Schaeffler sports season

DVSC Schaeffler
2021–22 season
- President: Zsolt Ábrók
- Manager: (Hungary) Zoltán Szilágyi
- Stadium: Hódos Imre Sports Hall
- NB I: Third place
- Hungarian Cup: Quarterfinal
- EHF European League: Qualification Round 3
- Top goalscorer: League: (Hungary) P. Vámos (90 goals); All: (Hungary) P. Vámos (95 goals)
- Highest home attendance: 2,000 two matches
- Lowest home attendance: 400 Vasas SC NB I (January 23, 2022)
Home colours	Away colours

The 2021–22 season is Debreceni VSC's 42nd competitive and consecutive season in the Nemzeti Bajnokság I and 73rd year in existence as a handball club.

Since August 2018 they are sponsored by Schaeffler Group, so the official name for the team is DVSC Schaeffler.

== Players ==
=== Squad information ===
Goalkeepers (GK)

- 12 (Hungary) Vanessa Torda
- 16 (Germany) Ann-Cathrin Giegerich
- 94 (France) Catherine Gabriel

Left wingers (LW)

- 24 (Hungary) Míra Vámos
- 71 (Hungary) Mirtill Petrus

Right wingers (RW)

- 28 (Hungary) Alexandra Töpfner
- 88 (Brazil) Mariana Costa

Line players (LP)

- 13 (Hungary) Petra Füzi-Tóvizi
- 18 (Hungary) Réka Bordás

Left backs (LB)

- 22 (Serbia) Jovana Jovović
- 44 (Hungary) Gréta Kácsor
- 77 (Hungary) Anna Krisztina Panyi
- 92 (Hungary) Dóra Hornyák (c)

Centre backs (CB)

- 25 (Hungary) Liliána Csernyánszki
- 38 (Hungary) Petra Vámos
- 81 (Hungary) Nina Szabó

Right backs (RB)

- 5 (Hungary) Konszuéla Hámori
- 43 (Hungary) Szimonetta Planéta

== Club ==
=== Technical Staff ===
Position	Staff member
President	(Hungary) Zsolt Ábrók
Technical manager	(Hungary) Marietta Vágó
Head coach	(Hungary) Zoltán Szilágyi
Assistant coach	(Hungary) Kitti Kudor
Goalkeeping coach	(Slovenia) Grega Karpan
Team doctor	(Hungary) Dr. Tamás Bazsó
Physiotherapist	(Hungary) Attila Kazsimér
Physiotherapist	(Hungary) Laura Kerék
Fitness coach	(Hungary) Emese Suba
Video Analytics	(Hungary) Attila Kun

Source: Coaches, Management

=== Uniform ===
- Supplier: (Germany) Adidas
- Main sponsor: Shaeffler / tippmix / Tranzit-Food / City of Debrecen / Manz
- Back sponsor: Volkswagen / Globus / Cívis Ház
- Arm sponsor: BCB Higiénia / EHF
- Shorts sponsor: Miko Coffee / CTS Informatika / MySeyu / Team&Event / tippmix

== Pre-season ==
=== Friendly matches ===
23 July 2021	DVSC Schaeffler	31–27	(Romania) CS Minaur Baia Mare	DESOK Csarnok, Debrecen; Attendance: 150; Referees: Á. Rontó, P. Szanyi (HUN)
23 July 2021	Szabó 7	(16–13)		DESOK Csarnok, Debrecen; Attendance: 150; Referees: Á. Rontó, P. Szanyi (HUN)
23 July 2021		Report		DESOK Csarnok, Debrecen; Attendance: 150; Referees: Á. Rontó, P. Szanyi (HUN)

30 July 2021	FTC-Rail Cargo Hungaria/MTK Budapest mixed team	29–30	DVSC Schaeffler	Mátraháza; Attendance: closed door Referees: Pánczél-Héjjas, Kránitz (HUN)
30 July 2021		(14–18)	Planéta 6	Mátraháza; Attendance: closed door Referees: Pánczél-Héjjas, Kránitz (HUN)
30 July 2021		Report		Mátraháza; Attendance: closed door Referees: Pánczél-Héjjas, Kránitz (HUN)

6 August 2021	DVSC Schaeffler	37–28	Békéscsabai Előre NKSE	DESOK Csarnok, Debrecen; Attendance: 150; Referees: L. Sándor, Cs. Szikszay (HUN)
6 August 2021	Szabó 9	(19–17)		DESOK Csarnok, Debrecen; Attendance: 150; Referees: L. Sándor, Cs. Szikszay (HUN)
6 August 2021		Report		DESOK Csarnok, Debrecen; Attendance: 150; Referees: L. Sándor, Cs. Szikszay (HUN)

11 August 2021	FTC-Rail Cargo Hungaria/MTK Budapest mixed team	34–30	DVSC Schaeffler	Elektromos Sportcsarnok, Budapest; Attendance: closed door Referees: Bócz, Wiedermann (HUN)
11 August 2021		(19–15)	Planéta 6	Elektromos Sportcsarnok, Budapest; Attendance: closed door Referees: Bócz, Wiedermann (HUN)
11 August 2021		Report		Elektromos Sportcsarnok, Budapest; Attendance: closed door Referees: Bócz, Wiedermann (HUN)

13 August 2021	Kisvárdai KC	21–31	DVSC Schaeffler	Nyíradony; Attendance: 50; Referees: Pánczél-Héjjas, Kránitz (HUN)
13 August 2021		(11–14)	Costa 6	Nyíradony; Attendance: 50; Referees: Pánczél-Héjjas, Kránitz (HUN)
13 August 2021		Report		Nyíradony; Attendance: 50; Referees: Pánczél-Héjjas, Kránitz (HUN)

20 August 2021; 16:00	(Romania) CSM București	28–26	DVSC Schaeffler	Antonio Alexe Arena, Oradea; Attendance: 150; Referees: Pipa, Suciu (ROU)
20 August 2021; 16:00	Arntzen 9	(17–11)	P. Vámos, Yezhikava, M. Vámos 4	Antonio Alexe Arena, Oradea; Attendance: 150; Referees: Pipa, Suciu (ROU)
20 August 2021; 16:00	2× (suspension)	Report	1× (suspension)	Antonio Alexe Arena, Oradea; Attendance: 150; Referees: Pipa, Suciu (ROU)

21 August 2021; 17:00	(Romania) CS Minaur Baia Mare	27–28	DVSC Schaeffler	Antonio Alexe Arena, Oradea; Attendance: 100; Referees: Pipa, Suciu (ROU)
21 August 2021; 17:00	Tănasie 7	(12–10)	P. Vámos 6	Antonio Alexe Arena, Oradea; Attendance: 100; Referees: Pipa, Suciu (ROU)
21 August 2021; 17:00	2× (suspension)	Report	1× (suspension)	Antonio Alexe Arena, Oradea; Attendance: 100; Referees: Pipa, Suciu (ROU)

27 August 2021; 15:30	DVSC Schaeffler	30–36	MTK Budapest	Hódos Imre Sports Hall, Debrecen; Attendance: 400; Referees: Erika Ónodi, Erika Pozdena (HUN)
27 August 2021; 15:30	P. Vámos 7	(17–20)	Bujdosó-Gerháth 8	Hódos Imre Sports Hall, Debrecen; Attendance: 400; Referees: Erika Ónodi, Erika Pozdena (HUN)
27 August 2021; 15:30		Report		Hódos Imre Sports Hall, Debrecen; Attendance: 400; Referees: Erika Ónodi, Erika Pozdena (HUN)

22 December 2021	DVSC Schaeffler	35–21	Kisvárdai KC	Hódos Imre Sports Hall, Debrecen; Attendance: 150; Referees: Ignéczi, Pánczél-Héjjas (HUN)
22 December 2021	Yezhikava 7	(20–8)		Hódos Imre Sports Hall, Debrecen; Attendance: 150; Referees: Ignéczi, Pánczél-Héjjas (HUN)
22 December 2021		Report		Hódos Imre Sports Hall, Debrecen; Attendance: 150; Referees: Ignéczi, Pánczél-Héjjas (HUN)

== Competitions ==
=== Overview ===
Competition	First match	Last match	Starting round	Record							
Competition	First match	Last match	Starting round	Pld	W	D	L	GF	GA	GD	Win %
Nemzeti Bajnokság I	10 September 2021	20 May 2022	Matchday 1	26	21	0	5	758	636	+122	80.77
Magyar Kupa	7 January 2022	9 March 2022	Fourth round	2	1	0	1	58	53	+5	50.00
EHF European League	13 November 2021	21 November 2021	Group stage	2	0	1	1	43	47	−4	0.00
Total				30	22	1	7	859	736	+123	73.33

Source: Competitions

=== Nemzeti Bajnokság I ===
==== League table ====
Pos	Team	Pld	W	D	L	GF	GA	GD	Pts	Qualification or relegation
1	Győri ETO KC (C)	26	25	0	1	876	568	+308	50 (Note: Győri Audi ETO KC 49–49 FTC-Rail Cargo Hungaria; Goal difference: Győri Audi ETO KC: +26)	Qualification to Champions League group phase
2	FTC-Rail Cargo Hungaria	26	25	0	1	849	574	+275	50	Qualification to Champions League group phase
3	DVSC SCHAEFFLER	26	21	0	5	758	636	+122	42	Qualification to European League group phase
4	Váci NKSE	26	17	0	9	799	758	+41	34	Qualification to European League third qualifying round
5	Motherson-Mosonmagyaróvári KC	26	14	2	10	812	756	+56	30 (Note: Motherson-Mosonmagyaróvár 74–57 Siófok KC)	Qualification to European League third qualifying round

Source: mksz.hu
Rules for classification: 1) Points; 2) Goal difference; 3) Head-to-head points; 4) Head-to-head goal difference; 5) Goals scored; 6) Matches won; 7) Draw (Note: Head-to-head record is used only after all the matches between the teams in question have been played)
(C) Champions

==== Results by round ====
Match	1	2	3	4	5	6	7	8	9	10	11	12	13	14	15	16	17	18	19	20	21	22	23	24	25	26
Ground	H	A	H	A	H	A	H	A	H	H	A	H	A	A	H	A	H	A	H	A	H	A	A	H	A	H
Result	W	W	W	W	W	L	W	L	W	W	W	W	L	W	W	W	W	W	L	W	W	W	W	W	W	L

Source: Matches
A = Away; H = Home; W = Win; D = Draw; L = Loss

==== Matches ====
Round 1; 10 September 2021; 18:00	DVSC Schaeffler	30–22	Kisvárdai KC	Hódos Imre Sports Hall, Debrecen; Attendance: 1,100; Referees: Ferenc Felhő, Tamás Öcsi (HUN)
Round 1; 10 September 2021; 18:00	P. Vámos 6	(13–12)	Radojević 5	Hódos Imre Sports Hall, Debrecen; Attendance: 1,100; Referees: Ferenc Felhő, Tamás Öcsi (HUN)
Round 1; 10 September 2021; 18:00	3× (yellow card)	Report	1× (yellow card) 2× (suspension)	Hódos Imre Sports Hall, Debrecen; Attendance: 1,100; Referees: Ferenc Felhő, Tamás Öcsi (HUN)

Round 2; 18 September 2021; 16:00	Hungast Szombathelyi KKA	25–29	DVSC Schaeffler	Arena Savaria, Szombathely; Attendance: 500; Referees: Gábor Kiu, Tamás Kiu (HUN)
Round 2; 18 September 2021; 16:00	Pődör 5	(14–15)	P. Vámos 7	Arena Savaria, Szombathely; Attendance: 500; Referees: Gábor Kiu, Tamás Kiu (HUN)
Round 2; 18 September 2021; 16:00	2× (yellow card) 6× (suspension)	Report	1× (yellow card) 4× (suspension)	Arena Savaria, Szombathely; Attendance: 500; Referees: Gábor Kiu, Tamás Kiu (HUN)

Round 3; 24 September 2021; 18:00	DVSC Schaeffler	30–21	Moyra-Budaörs Handball	Hódos Imre Sports Hall, Debrecen; Attendance: 800; Referees: Máté Bujdosó, Viktor Horváth (HUN)
Round 3; 24 September 2021; 18:00	P. Vámos 6	(12–10)	Schneider 5	Hódos Imre Sports Hall, Debrecen; Attendance: 800; Referees: Máté Bujdosó, Viktor Horváth (HUN)
Round 3; 24 September 2021; 18:00	2× (yellow card) 2× (suspension)	Report	1× (yellow card) 5× (suspension)	Hódos Imre Sports Hall, Debrecen; Attendance: 800; Referees: Máté Bujdosó, Viktor Horváth (HUN)

Round 4; 1 October 2021; 18:00	Váci NKSE	25–26	DVSC Schaeffler	Városi Sportcsarnok Vác, Vác; Attendance: 300; Referees: Miklós Andorka, Róbert Hucker (HUN)
Round 4; 1 October 2021; 18:00	Kuczora 7	(15–13)	P. Vámos, Planéta 5	Városi Sportcsarnok Vác, Vác; Attendance: 300; Referees: Miklós Andorka, Róbert Hucker (HUN)
Round 4; 1 October 2021; 18:00	1× (yellow card) 1× (suspension)	Report	2× (suspension)	Városi Sportcsarnok Vác, Vác; Attendance: 300; Referees: Miklós Andorka, Róbert Hucker (HUN)

Round 5; 22 October 2021; 18:00	DVSC Schaeffler	28–19	Mosonmagyaróvári KC SE	Hódos Imre Sports Hall, Debrecen; Attendance: 1,000; Referees: Gábor Hargitai, Gábor Markó (HUN)
Round 5; 22 October 2021; 18:00	Korsós 5	(12–11)	G. Tóth 6	Hódos Imre Sports Hall, Debrecen; Attendance: 1,000; Referees: Gábor Hargitai, Gábor Markó (HUN)
Round 5; 22 October 2021; 18:00	1× (yellow card) 6× (suspension)	Report	2× (yellow card) 8× (suspension)	Hódos Imre Sports Hall, Debrecen; Attendance: 1,000; Referees: Gábor Hargitai, Gábor Markó (HUN)

Round 6; 27 October 2021; 17:30	FTC-Rail Cargo Hungaria	29–26	DVSC Schaeffler	Elek Gyula Aréna, Budapest; Attendance: 1,100; Referees: László Bócz, Viktor Wiedermann (HUN)
Round 6; 27 October 2021; 17:30	Klujber 6	(17–16)	Petrus 5	Elek Gyula Aréna, Budapest; Attendance: 1,100; Referees: László Bócz, Viktor Wiedermann (HUN)
Round 6; 27 October 2021; 17:30	1× (suspension)	Report	2× (suspension)	Elek Gyula Aréna, Budapest; Attendance: 1,100; Referees: László Bócz, Viktor Wiedermann (HUN)

Round 7; 5 November 2021; 18:00	DVSC Schaeffler	34–26	Érd HC	Hódos Imre Sports Hall, Debrecen; Attendance: 800; Referees: Erika Őri, Erika Ónodi (HUN)
Round 7; 5 November 2021; 18:00	Korsós 8	(15–14)	Sztankovics 7	Hódos Imre Sports Hall, Debrecen; Attendance: 800; Referees: Erika Őri, Erika Ónodi (HUN)
Round 7; 5 November 2021; 18:00	2× (yellow card) 2× (suspension)	Report	1× (yellow card) 3× (suspension)	Hódos Imre Sports Hall, Debrecen; Attendance: 800; Referees: Erika Őri, Erika Ónodi (HUN)

Round 8; 10 November 2021; 17:30	MTK Budapest	29–28	DVSC Schaeffler	Sterbinszky Amália Kézilabdacsarnok, Budapest; Attendance: 150; Referees: Dániel Paska, Sámuel Vastag (HUN)
Round 8; 10 November 2021; 17:30	Kekezović 7	(14–18)	Hornyák 5	Sterbinszky Amália Kézilabdacsarnok, Budapest; Attendance: 150; Referees: Dániel Paska, Sámuel Vastag (HUN)
Round 8; 10 November 2021; 17:30	1× (yellow card) 2× (suspension)	Report	1× (yellow card) 4× (suspension)	Sterbinszky Amália Kézilabdacsarnok, Budapest; Attendance: 150; Referees: Dániel Paska, Sámuel Vastag (HUN)

Round 9; 17 November 2021; 18:00	DVSC Schaeffler	35–27	Dunaújvárosi Kohász KA	Hódos Imre Sports Hall, Debrecen; Attendance: 800; Referees: Ferenc Felhő, Tamás Öcsi (HUN)
Round 9; 17 November 2021; 18:00	three players 5	(17–16)	Szalai 6	Hódos Imre Sports Hall, Debrecen; Attendance: 800; Referees: Ferenc Felhő, Tamás Öcsi (HUN)
Round 9; 17 November 2021; 18:00	1× (yellow card) 3× (suspension)	Report	1× (yellow card) 2× (suspension)	Hódos Imre Sports Hall, Debrecen; Attendance: 800; Referees: Ferenc Felhő, Tamás Öcsi (HUN)

Round 10; 30 December 2021; 18:00	DVSC Schaeffler	10–0	Alba Fehérvár KC	Hódos Imre Sports Hall, Debrecen; Attendance: 1
Round 10; 30 December 2021; 18:00		(0–0)		Hódos Imre Sports Hall, Debrecen; Attendance: 1
Round 10; 30 December 2021; 18:00		Report		Hódos Imre Sports Hall, Debrecen; Attendance: 1

Round 11; 15 January 2022; 18:00	Siófok KC	21–23	DVSC Schaeffler	Kiss Szilárd Aréna, Siófok; Attendance: 600; Referees: Kristóf Altmár, Márton Horváth (HUN)
Round 11; 15 January 2022; 18:00	Debreczeni-Klivinyi, Lakatos 4	(10–8)	P. Vámos, Fachinello 5	Kiss Szilárd Aréna, Siófok; Attendance: 600; Referees: Kristóf Altmár, Márton Horváth (HUN)
Round 11; 15 January 2022; 18:00	3× (suspension) 1× (red card)	Report	1× (yellow card) 5× (suspension)	Kiss Szilárd Aréna, Siófok; Attendance: 600; Referees: Kristóf Altmár, Márton Horváth (HUN)

Round 12; 23 January 2022; 18:00	DVSC Schaeffler	31–29	Vasas SC	Hódos Imre Sports Hall, Debrecen; Attendance: 400; Referees: Máté Bujdosó, Viktor Horváth (HUN)
Round 12; 23 January 2022; 18:00	Korsós, Yezhikava 6	(22–17)	Kajdon, Szilovics 8	Hódos Imre Sports Hall, Debrecen; Attendance: 400; Referees: Máté Bujdosó, Viktor Horváth (HUN)
Round 12; 23 January 2022; 18:00	1× (yellow card) 6× (suspension)	Report	2× (yellow card) 4× (suspension)	Hódos Imre Sports Hall, Debrecen; Attendance: 400; Referees: Máté Bujdosó, Viktor Horváth (HUN)

Round 13; 28 January 2022; 16:00	Győri Audi ETO KC	31–23	DVSC Schaeffler	Audi Aréna, Győr; Attendance: 1,785; Referees: Miklós Andorka, Róbert Hucker (HUN)
Round 13; 28 January 2022; 16:00	Pintea 10	(17–9)	Planéta 6	Audi Aréna, Győr; Attendance: 1,785; Referees: Miklós Andorka, Róbert Hucker (HUN)
Round 13; 28 January 2022; 16:00	1× (yellow card)	Report	2× (yellow card)	Audi Aréna, Győr; Attendance: 1,785; Referees: Miklós Andorka, Róbert Hucker (HUN)

Round 14; 11 February 2022; 18:00	Kisvárdai KC	27–28	DVSC Schaeffler	Városi Sportcsarnok Kisvárda, Kisvárda; Attendance: 700; Referees: Dániel Páska, Sámuel Vastag (HUN)
Round 14; 11 February 2022; 18:00	Radojević 8	(9–11)	P. Vámos 9	Városi Sportcsarnok Kisvárda, Kisvárda; Attendance: 700; Referees: Dániel Páska, Sámuel Vastag (HUN)
Round 14; 11 February 2022; 18:00	2× (yellow card) 3× (suspension)	Report	1× (yellow card) 1× (suspension)	Városi Sportcsarnok Kisvárda, Kisvárda; Attendance: 700; Referees: Dániel Páska, Sámuel Vastag (HUN)

Round 15; 18 February 2022; 18:00	DVSC Schaeffler	45–29	Hungast Szombathelyi KKA	Hódos Imre Sports Hall, Debrecen; Attendance: 600; Referees: Bence Asztalos, Zoltán Szalay (HUN)
Round 15; 18 February 2022; 18:00	M. Vámos 9	(23–14)	Pödör 7	Hódos Imre Sports Hall, Debrecen; Attendance: 600; Referees: Bence Asztalos, Zoltán Szalay (HUN)
Round 15; 18 February 2022; 18:00	1× (yellow card) 5× (suspension)	Report	4× (suspension)	Hódos Imre Sports Hall, Debrecen; Attendance: 600; Referees: Bence Asztalos, Zoltán Szalay (HUN)

Round 16; 25 February 2022; 18:00	Moyra-Budaörs Handball	32–38	DVSC Schaeffler	Városi Sportcsarnok Budaörs, Budaörs; Attendance: 470; Referees: László Bócz, Viktor Wiedermann (HUN)
Round 16; 25 February 2022; 18:00	Jovović 8	(14–17)	Yezhikava 9	Városi Sportcsarnok Budaörs, Budaörs; Attendance: 470; Referees: László Bócz, Viktor Wiedermann (HUN)
Round 16; 25 February 2022; 18:00	2× (suspension)	Report	1× (yellow card) 4× (suspension)	Városi Sportcsarnok Budaörs, Budaörs; Attendance: 470; Referees: László Bócz, Viktor Wiedermann (HUN)

Round 17; 12 March 2022; 18:00	DVSC Schaeffler	30–25	Váci NKSE	Hódos Imre Sports Hall, Debrecen; Attendance: 1,800; Referees: Szabolcs Bóna, Csaba Földesi (HUN)
Round 17; 12 March 2022; 18:00	M. Vámos, Planéta 7	(14–13)	Kuczora 8	Hódos Imre Sports Hall, Debrecen; Attendance: 1,800; Referees: Szabolcs Bóna, Csaba Földesi (HUN)
Round 17; 12 March 2022; 18:00	1× (yellow card) 1× (suspension)	Report	2× (suspension)	Hódos Imre Sports Hall, Debrecen; Attendance: 1,800; Referees: Szabolcs Bóna, Csaba Földesi (HUN)

Round 18; 18 March 2022; 17:45	Mosonmagyaróvári KC SE	23–31	DVSC Schaeffler	UFM Aréna, Mosonmagyaróvár; Attendance: 1,000; Referees: Ferenc Felhő, Tamás Öcsi (HUN)
Round 18; 18 March 2022; 17:45	E. Tóth 7	(12–12)	A. Kovács 7	UFM Aréna, Mosonmagyaróvár; Attendance: 1,000; Referees: Ferenc Felhő, Tamás Öcsi (HUN)
Round 18; 18 March 2022; 17:45	1× (yellow card) 4× (suspension) 1× (red card)	Report	1× (yellow card) 2× (suspension) 1× (red card)	UFM Aréna, Mosonmagyaróvár; Attendance: 1,000; Referees: Ferenc Felhő, Tamás Öcsi (HUN)

Round 19; 23 March 2022; 17:45	DVSC Schaeffler	23–29	FTC-Rail Cargo Hungaria	Hódos Imre Sports Hall, Debrecen; Attendance: 2,000; Referees: Péter Horváth, Balázs Marton (HUN)
Round 19; 23 March 2022; 17:45	Planéta 6	(12–17)	Bölk, Szöllősi-Zácsik 5	Hódos Imre Sports Hall, Debrecen; Attendance: 2,000; Referees: Péter Horváth, Balázs Marton (HUN)
Round 19; 23 March 2022; 17:45	2× (yellow card) 3× (suspension)	Report	2× (yellow card) 5× (suspension)	Hódos Imre Sports Hall, Debrecen; Attendance: 2,000; Referees: Péter Horváth, Balázs Marton (HUN)

Round 20; 31 March 2022; 18:00	Érd HC	22–33	DVSC Schaeffler	Érd Aréna, Érd; Attendance: 400; Referees: Tamás Fekete, Dávid Tóth (HUN)
Round 20; 31 March 2022; 18:00	K. Szabó 9	(12–17)	A. Kovács 10	Érd Aréna, Érd; Attendance: 400; Referees: Tamás Fekete, Dávid Tóth (HUN)
Round 20; 31 March 2022; 18:00	2× (yellow card) 2× (suspension)	Report	1× (yellow card) 4× (suspension)	Érd Aréna, Érd; Attendance: 400; Referees: Tamás Fekete, Dávid Tóth (HUN)

Round 21; 8 April 2022; 18:00	DVSC Schaeffler	29–26	MTK Budapest	Hódos Imre Sports Hall, Debrecen; Attendance: 1,000; Referees: Ádám Rontó, Péter Szanyi (HUN)
Round 21; 8 April 2022; 18:00	P. Vámos 6	(12–15)	Pál 9	Hódos Imre Sports Hall, Debrecen; Attendance: 1,000; Referees: Ádám Rontó, Péter Szanyi (HUN)
Round 21; 8 April 2022; 18:00	2× (yellow card) 2× (suspension)	Report	2× (suspension)	Hódos Imre Sports Hall, Debrecen; Attendance: 1,000; Referees: Ádám Rontó, Péter Szanyi (HUN)

Round 22; 13 April 2022; 18:00	Dunaújvárosi Kohász KA	21–22	DVSC Schaeffler	Városi Sportcsarnok, Dunaújváros; Attendance: 350; Referees: Tibor Kovács, Balázs Mándli (HUN)
Round 22; 13 April 2022; 18:00	Borgyos 5	(9–12)	Töpfner 13	Városi Sportcsarnok, Dunaújváros; Attendance: 350; Referees: Tibor Kovács, Balázs Mándli (HUN)
Round 22; 13 April 2022; 18:00	1× (yellow card) 3× (suspension)	Report	2× (yellow card) 4× (suspension)	Városi Sportcsarnok, Dunaújváros; Attendance: 350; Referees: Tibor Kovács, Balázs Mándli (HUN)

Round 23; 30 April 2022; 18:00	Alba Fehérvár KC	28–36	DVSC Schaeffler	Köfém Sportcsarnok, Székesfehérvár; Attendance: 300; Referees: Gábor Kiu, Tamás Kiu (HUN)
Round 23; 30 April 2022; 18:00	Töpfner 10	(14–18)	A. Kovács 7	Köfém Sportcsarnok, Székesfehérvár; Attendance: 300; Referees: Gábor Kiu, Tamás Kiu (HUN)
Round 23; 30 April 2022; 18:00	1× (suspension)	Report	3× (yellow card) 4× (suspension) 1× (red card)	Köfém Sportcsarnok, Székesfehérvár; Attendance: 300; Referees: Gábor Kiu, Tamás Kiu (HUN)

Round 24; 6 May 2022; 18:00	DVSC Schaeffler	32–26	Siófok KC	Hódos Imre Sports Hall, Debrecen; Attendance: 1,100; Referees: Bence Asztalos, Zoltán Szalay (HUN)
Round 24; 6 May 2022; 18:00	M. Vámos 8	(14–15)	Mavsar 9	Hódos Imre Sports Hall, Debrecen; Attendance: 1,100; Referees: Bence Asztalos, Zoltán Szalay (HUN)
Round 24; 6 May 2022; 18:00	2× (yellow card) 6× (suspension)	Report	1× (yellow card) 4× (suspension)	Hódos Imre Sports Hall, Debrecen; Attendance: 1,100; Referees: Bence Asztalos, Zoltán Szalay (HUN)

Round 25; 14 May 2022; 17:00	Vasas SC	16–33	DVSC Schaeffler	Sterbinszky Amália Kézilabdacsarnok, Budapest; Attendance: 200; Referees: Erika Őri, Erika Ónodi (HUN)
Round 25; 14 May 2022; 17:00	Laništanin 4	(9–14)	M. Vámos 9	Sterbinszky Amália Kézilabdacsarnok, Budapest; Attendance: 200; Referees: Erika Őri, Erika Ónodi (HUN)
Round 25; 14 May 2022; 17:00	1× (yellow card) 3× (suspension)	Report	1× (yellow card) 3× (suspension)	Sterbinszky Amália Kézilabdacsarnok, Budapest; Attendance: 200; Referees: Erika Őri, Erika Ónodi (HUN)

Round 26; 20 May 2022; 18:30	DVSC Schaeffler	25–28	Győri Audi ETO KC	Hódos Imre Sports Hall, Debrecen; Attendance: 2,000; Referees: Péter Horváth, Balázs Marton (HUN)
Round 26; 20 May 2022; 18:30	M. Vámos 7	(13–16)	three players 5	Hódos Imre Sports Hall, Debrecen; Attendance: 2,000; Referees: Péter Horváth, Balázs Marton (HUN)
Round 26; 20 May 2022; 18:30	2× (yellow card)	Report	1× (yellow card) 3× (suspension)	Hódos Imre Sports Hall, Debrecen; Attendance: 2,000; Referees: Péter Horváth, Balázs Marton (HUN)

==== Results overview ====
All results are indicated from the perspective of DVSC Schaeffler.
We indicate in parentheses the number of round.
Win Draw Loss Postponed

Opposition	Home score	Away score	Aggregate score	Double
Alba Fehérvár KC	10–0	36–28	46–28	Yes
Moyra-Budaörs Handball	30–21	38–32	68–53	Yes
Győri ETO KC	25–28	23–31	48–59	No
Dunaújvárosi Kohász KA	35–27	22–21	57–48	Yes
Érd	34–26	33–22	67–48	Yes
FTC-Rail Cargo Hungaria	23–29	26–29	49–58	No
Kisvárda Master Good SE	30–22	28–27	58–49	Yes
Motherson-Mosonmagyaróvár	28–19	31–23	59–42	Yes
MTK Budapest	29–26	28–29	57–55	No
Hungast Szombathelyi KKA	45–29	29–25	74–54	Yes
Siófok KC	32–26	23–21	55–47	Yes
Vasas SC	31–29	33–16	64–45	Yes
Váci NKSE	30–25	26–25	56–50	Yes

=== Hungarian Cup ===
==== Round 4 ====
Round 4; 7 January 2022; 15:00	Eger-Eszterházy SzSE	23–36	DVSC Schaeffler	Kemény Ferenc Sportcsarnok, Eger; Attendance: 100; Referees: Stefánia Kovács-Sebők, Réka Vastag-Réti (HUN)
Round 4; 7 January 2022; 15:00	Szecsődi 5	(13–18)	Yezhikava 10	Kemény Ferenc Sportcsarnok, Eger; Attendance: 100; Referees: Stefánia Kovács-Sebők, Réka Vastag-Réti (HUN)
Round 4; 7 January 2022; 15:00	1× (yellow card) 5× (suspension)	Report	5× (suspension)	Kemény Ferenc Sportcsarnok, Eger; Attendance: 100; Referees: Stefánia Kovács-Sebők, Réka Vastag-Réti (HUN)

==== Quarterfinal ====
Round QF; 9 March 2022; 18:30	DVSC Schaeffler	22–30	FTC-Rail Cargo Hungaria	Hódos Imre Sports Hall, Debrecen; Attendance: 1,800; Referees: Kristóf Altmár, Márton Horváth (HUN)
Round QF; 9 March 2022; 18:30	Planéta 5	(11–14)	Bölk, Malestein 7	Hódos Imre Sports Hall, Debrecen; Attendance: 1,800; Referees: Kristóf Altmár, Márton Horváth (HUN)
Round QF; 9 March 2022; 18:30	1× (yellow card) 1× (suspension)	Report	1× (suspension)	Hódos Imre Sports Hall, Debrecen; Attendance: 1,800; Referees: Kristóf Altmár, Márton Horváth (HUN)

=== EHF European League ===
==== Round 3 ====
===== Matches =====
13 November 2021; 20:00	DVSC Schaeffler	22–22	CS Măgura Cisnădie (Romania)	Hódos Imre Sports Hall, Debrecen; Attendance: 1,800; Referees: Valery Butskevich, Yury Butskevich (BLR)
13 November 2021; 20:00	Planéta 6	(12–11)	Blažević, Bardac 6	Hódos Imre Sports Hall, Debrecen; Attendance: 1,800; Referees: Valery Butskevich, Yury Butskevich (BLR)
13 November 2021; 20:00	2× (yellow card) 2× (suspension)	Report	2× (yellow card) 3× (suspension)	Hódos Imre Sports Hall, Debrecen; Attendance: 1,800; Referees: Valery Butskevich, Yury Butskevich (BLR)

21 November 2021; 17:00	CS Măgura Cisnădie (Romania)	25–21	DVSC Schaeffler	Sala Polivalentă, Cisnadie; Attendance: closed doors Referees: Svetoslav Yovchev, Zvezdelin Yonchev (BUL)
21 November 2021; 17:00	Bardac 7	(15–9)	A. Kovács 4	Sala Polivalentă, Cisnadie; Attendance: closed doors Referees: Svetoslav Yovchev, Zvezdelin Yonchev (BUL)
21 November 2021; 17:00	1× (yellow card) 2× (suspension)	Report	1× (yellow card) 5× (suspension)	Sala Polivalentă, Cisnadie; Attendance: closed doors Referees: Svetoslav Yovchev, Zvezdelin Yonchev (BUL)

== Statistics ==
=== Top scorers ===
Includes all competitive matches. The list is sorted by shirt number when total goals are equal. Last updated on 20 May 2022.

Position	Nation	No.	Name	Hungarian League	Hungarian Cup	EHF European League	Total
1	(Hungary)	38	Petra Vámos	90	2	3	95
2	(Hungary)	43	Szimonetta Planéta	75	8	9	92
2	(Belarus)	73	Karina Yezhikava	75	12	5	92
4	(Hungary)	24	Míra Vámos	71	1	4	76
5	(Hungary)	5	Anna Kovács	68	0	6	74
6	(Hungary)	13	Petra Füzi-Tóvizi	51	6	1	58
6	(Hungary)	71	Mirtill Petrus	51	7	0	58
8	(Hungary)	18	Réka Bordás	47	4	1	52
9	(Brazil)	88	Mariana Costa	46	2	2	50
10	(Hungary)	81	Nina Szabó	43	1	2	46

=== Attendances ===
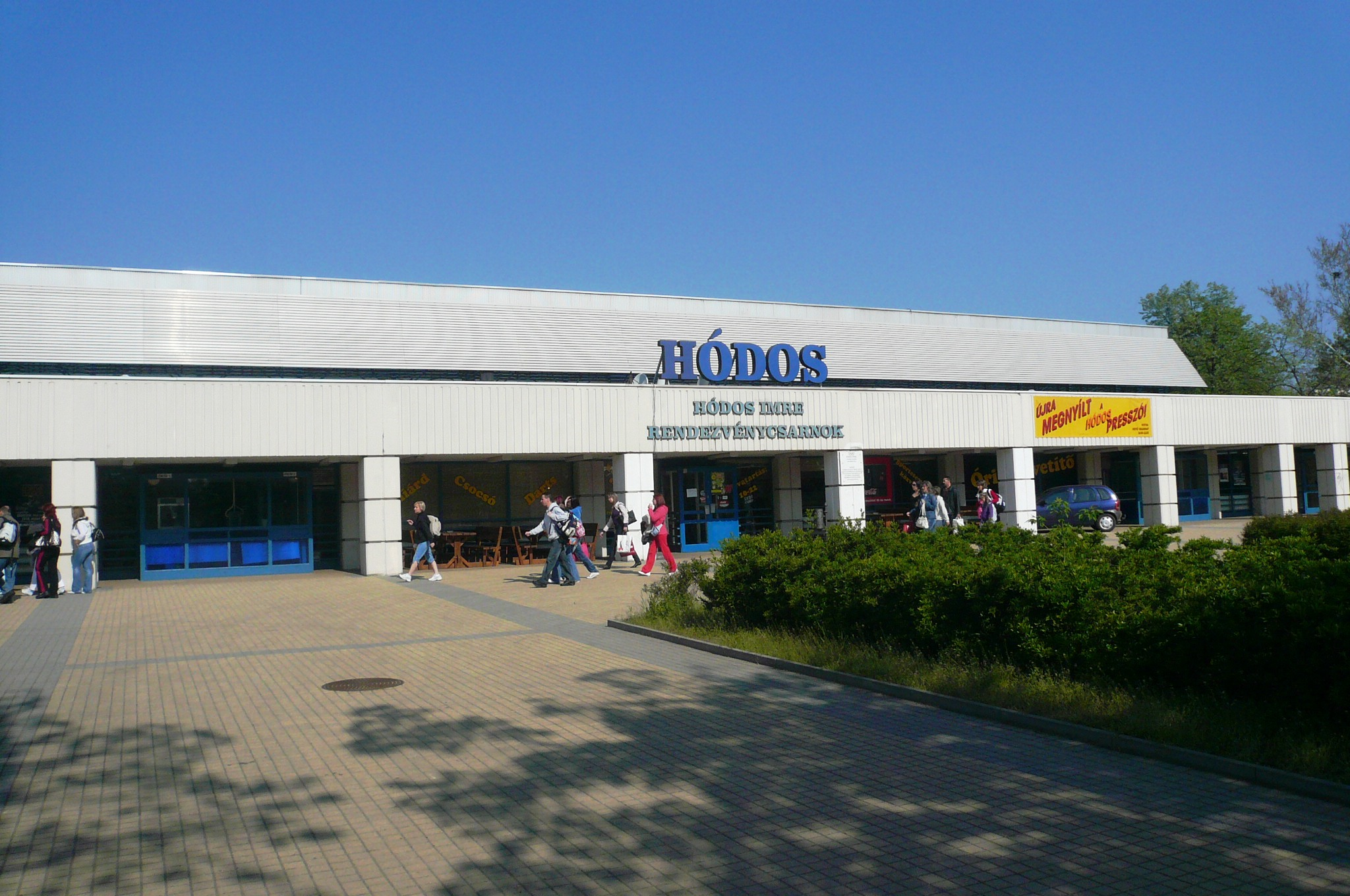
Home hall: Hódos Imre Sports Hall

List of the home matches:

Round	Against	Attendance	Capatility	Date
NB I- 1.	Kisvárda	1,100	55,0%	10 September 2021
NB I- 3.	Budaörs	800	40,0%	22 October 2021
NB I- 5.	Mosonmagyaróvár	1,000	50,0%	22 October 2021
NB I- 7.	Érd	800	40,0%	5 November 2021
NB I- 9.	Dunaújváros	800	40,0%	17 November 2021
NB I- 10.	Fehérvár	1	0,1%	30 December 2021
EL R3	Măgura Cisnădie (Romania)	1,800	90,0%	13 November 2021
NB I- 12.	Vasas	400	20,0%	23 January 2022
NB I- 15.	Szombathely	600	30,0%	18 February 2022
CUP QF	Ferencváros	1,800	90,0%	9 March 2022
NB I- 17.	Vác	1,800	90,0%	12 March 2022
NB I- 19.	Ferencváros	2,000	100,0%	23 March 2022
NB I- 21.	MTK Budapest	1,000	50,0%	8 April 2022
NB I- 24.	Siófok	1,100	55,0%	6 May 2022
NB I- 26.	Győr	2,000	100,0%	20 May 2022
