= Gabrijela =

Gabrijela (Croatian pronunciation: [ɡabrijěla, ɡabrǐ-]) is a Croatian given name. It may refer to:

- Gabrijela Bartulović (born 1994), Croatian handball player
- Gabrijela Skender (born 1999), Croatian cross-country skier
- Gabriela Španić (born 1973), Venezuelan actress
