= Maas International =

Maas
- Formerly: Maas International
- Type: Private
- Industry: Vending machine operation
- Founded: 1889
- Headquarters: Netherlands
- Area served: Netherlands
- Products: Coffee, beverage and snack vending services
- Owner: Miko Group (majority stake, since 2021)
- Website: www.maas.nl

Maas, formerly known as Maas International, is a Dutch company operating coffee vending machines. The company was founded in 1889 as a cigar producer. In 2021, Belgian holding Miko group acquired the majority ownership.

== History ==
Maas was originally established in 1889 as a cigar producer. The company transformed into a cigarette wholesaler and after World War II it became an operator of cigarette vending machines. In the 1970´s, Maas International incorporated coffee, beverages and snacks in its vending machines. In 2001 the wholesale branch was sold. In 2015, Maas started to divest its international operations and concentrate on the Netherlands.

== Operations ==
Maas is part of the International Vending Alliance, a vending machine operating network. Its head head office is in Son. With over 600,000 vending machines in operation worldwide it was considered one of the largest companies in the industry. The company was organized in 4 regions, EMEA (Europe Middle-East and Africa), Asia Pacific, Latin America and North America.

== Ownership ==
Maas is majority owned by the Miko Group, a Belgian stock exchange listed specialist in coffee service. Prior to the acquisition of the majority share in 2021, the company was owned by the Dutch Private Equity firm Nimbus.
