= 2023–24 Magyar Kupa (women's handball) =

Hungarian women's handball season

Török Bódog női Magyar Kupa

Tournament details
- Country: Hungary
- Dates: 22 August 2023 – 10 March 2024
- Teams: 32

Final positions
- Champions: FTC-Rail Cargo Hungaria (15th title)
- Runners-up: Győri Audi ETO KC
- Third place: DVSC Schaeffler
- Fourth place: Motherson Mosonmagyaróvár

The 2023–24 Magyar Kupa (English: Hungarian Cup) is the 66th season of Hungary's annual knock-out cup handball competition. The full name of the competition is Török Bódog női Magyar Kupa in honor of the Hungarian handball legend Bódog Török.

In the 2023-24 season, FTC-Rail Cargo Hungaria won their fifteenth title by defeating the biggest rival Győri Audi ETO KC in the final.

== Schedule ==
Times up to 28 October 2023 and from 31 March 2024 are CEST (UTC+2). Times from 29 October 2023 to 30 March 2024 are CET (UTC+1).

The rounds of the 2023–24 competition are scheduled as follows:

| Round | Draw date and time | Matches | Fixtures | Clubs | New entries | Leagues entering |
|---|---|---|---|---|---|---|
| Round I | 25 July 2023, 13:02 | 22 August–5 September 2023 | 2 | 4 → 2 | 4 | Nemzeti Bajnokság I/B and, Nemzeti Bajnokság II |
| Round II | 26 September 2023, 15:03 | 11–25 October 2023 | 8 | 16 → 8 | 14 | Nemzeti Bajnokság I/B and, Nemzeti Bajnokság II |
| Round III | 31 October 2023, 15:30 | 14–16 November 2023 | 8 | 16 → 8 | 8 | Nemzeti Bajnokság I, places 7–14 |
| Round IV | 21 November 2023, 11:48 | 10 January 2024 | 6 | 12 → 6 | 4 | Nemzeti Bajnokság I, places 3–6 |
| Quarter-finals | 12 January 2024, 12:00 | 31 January 2024 | 4 | 8 → 4 | 2 | Nemzeti Bajnokság I, places 1–2 |
| Final four | 5 February 2024, 16:07 | 9–10 March 2024 | 4 | 4 → 1 | none | none |

== Teams ==
A total of 32 teams competed in the 2023–24 edition, comprising 14 teams from the Nemzeti Bajnokság I (tier 1), 14 teams from the Nemzeti Bajnokság I/B (tier 2) and 4 teams from the Nemzeti Bajnokság II (tier 3).

=== Nemzeti Bajnokság I ===
- TAPPE-Békéscsabai Előre NKSE
- Moyra-Budaörs Handball
- DVSC-Schaeffler
- Dunaújvárosi Kohász KA
- Alba Fehérvár KC
- FTC-Rail Cargo Hungaria
- Győri Audi ETO KC
- Kisvárda Master Good SE
- Kozármisleny KA
- Motherson-Mosonmagyaróvár
- MTK Budapest
- NEKA
- Vasas SC
- Praktiker-Vác

=== Nemzeti Bajnokság I/B ===
- Eszterházy SC
- Esztergomi Vitézek
- Érd HC
- Gárdony-Pázmánd NKK
- Hajdúnánás Kézilabda NKFT
- Kispest NKK
- Komárom VSE
- Orosházi Kézilabda Akadémia
- PTE PEAC-SIPO
- PC Trade SZNKE
- Szigetszentmiklós NKSE
- SZISE - Bamba Marha
- Szombathelyi KKA
- Tempo KSE

=== Nemzeti Bajnokság II ===
Northwest Group

- Red Velvet KC Budapest

Southwest Group

- Mohácsi TE 1888

Northeast Group

- Borsod Sport Klub-Miskolc
- STAVMAT Füzesabonyi SC

Southeast Group

- None

== Matches ==
A total of 32 matches took place, starting with First round on 22 August 2023 and culminating with the Final on 10 March 2024.

=== First round ===
The first round ties was scheduled for 22 August – 5 September 2023.

| Team 1 | Score | Team 2 |
22 August
| Tempo KSE (2) | 34–24 | (2) Szigetszentmiklós NKSE |
5 September
| Borsod Sport Klub-Miskolc (3) | 33–11 | (2) Eszterházy SC |

=== Second round ===
The second round ties was scheduled for 11–25 October 2023.

| Team 1 | Score | Team 2 |
11 October
| Borsod Sport Klub-Miskolc (3) | 27–26 | (2) Hajdúnánás Kézilabda NKFT |
12 October
| STAVMAT Füzesabonyi SC (3) | 22–34 | (2) Orosházi Kézilabda Akadémia |
13 October
| Tempo KSE (2) | 32–27 | (2) Kispest NKK |
| PC Trade SZNKE (2) | 32–34 | (2) SZISE - Bamba Marha |
18 October
| Red Velvet KC Budapest (3) | 0–10 | (2) PTE PEAC-SIPO |
24 October
| Esztergomi Vitézek (2) | 36–28 | (2) Gárdony-Pázmánd NKK |
| Szombathelyi KKA (2) | 28–28 (a) | (2) Komárom VSE |
25 October
| Mohácsi TE 1888 (3) | 20–30 | (2) Érd HC |

=== Third round ===
The third round ties was scheduled for 14–16 November 2023.

| Team 1 | Score | Team 2 |
14 November
| Dunaújvárosi Kohász KA (1) | 33–30 | (2) Komárom VSE |
| Esztergomi Vitézek (2) | 30–25 | (1) Moyra-Budaörs Handball |
| SZISE - Bamba Marha (2) | 29–46 | (1) MTK Budapest |
15 November
| Vasas SC (1) | 24–36 | (1) Kisvárda Master Good SE |
| PTE PEAC-SIPO (2) | 25–38 | (2) Érd HC |
| Kozármisleny KA (1) | 23–24 | (1) NEKA |
| Orosházi Kézilabda Akadémia (2) | 29–35 | (1) TAPPE-Békéscsabai Előre NKSE |
16 November
| Borsod Sport Klub-Miskolc (3) | 37–27 | (2) Tempo KSE |

=== Fourth round ===
The fourth round ties was scheduled for 20 December 2023 – 10 January 2024.

| Team 1 | Score | Team 2 |
20 December 2023
| Motherson-Mosonmagyaróvár (1) | 37–29 | (1) NEKA |
23 December 2023
| Borsod Sport Klub-Miskolc (3) | 26–42 | (1) MTK Budapest |
6 January 2024
| Dunaújvárosi Kohász KA (1) | 31–27 | (1) TAPPE-Békéscsabai Előre NKSE |
| Érd HC (2) | 24–35 | (1) Kisvárda Master Good SE |
10 January 2024
| Praktiker-Vác (1) | 26–26 (a) | (1) DVSC-Schaeffler |
| Esztergomi Vitézek (2) | 32–26 | (1) Alba Fehérvár KC |

=== Quarter-finals ===
The Quarter finals ties was scheduled for 29–31 January 2024.

| Team 1 | Score | Team 2 |
29 January
| Győri Audi ETO KC (1) | 37–19 | (1) Kisvárda Master Good SE |
30 January
| Esztergomi Vitézek (2) | 24–32 | (1) Motherson-Mosonmagyaróvár |
31 January
| FTC-Rail Cargo Hungaria (1) | 38–24 | (1) MTK Budapest |
| Dunaújvárosi Kohász KA (1) | 23–36 | (1) DVSC-Schaeffler |

== Final four ==
The final four will be held on 9–10 March 2024 at the Tatabányai Multifunkcionális Sportcsarnok in Tatabánya.

Semi-finals
9 March, 15:00
Győri Audi ETO KC | 29
DVSC Schaeffler | 28
9 March, 17:30
Motherson Mosonmagyaróvár | 25
FTC-Rail Cargo Hungaria | 29

Final
10 March, 18:00
Győri Audi ETO KC | 23
FTC-Rail Cargo Hungaria | 25
Bronze medal match
10 March, 15:00
DVSC Schaeffler | 34
Motherson Mosonmagyaróvár | 29

=== Final standings ===
| | Team |
|---|---|
| | FTC-Rail Cargo Hungaria; 15th title |
| Silver medal | Győri Audi ETO KC |
| Bronze medal | DVSC Schaeffler |
| 4th | Motherson Mosonmagyaróvár |

=== Semi-finals ===
| 9 March 2024; 15:00 | Győri Audi ETO KC | 29–28 | DVSC Schaeffler | Tatabányai Multifunkcionális Sportcsarnok, Tatabánya; Attendance: 3,000; Referees: Hargitai, Markó |
| 9 March 2024; 15:00 | Brattset Dale, Kristiansen 6 | (16–12) | Töpfner 6 | Tatabányai Multifunkcionális Sportcsarnok, Tatabánya; Attendance: 3,000; Referees: Hargitai, Markó |
| 9 March 2024; 15:00 | 1× (yellow card) 2× (suspension) | Report | 2× (yellow card) 2× (suspension) | Tatabányai Multifunkcionális Sportcsarnok, Tatabánya; Attendance: 3,000; Referees: Hargitai, Markó |

| 9 March 2024; 17:30 | Motherson Mosonmagyaróvár | 25–29 | FTC-Rail Cargo Hungaria | Tatabányai Multifunkcionális Sportcsarnok, Tatabánya; Attendance: 3,000; Referees: Bócz, Wiedemann |
| 9 March 2024; 17:30 | E. Tóth 5 | (10–14) | Klujber 8 | Tatabányai Multifunkcionális Sportcsarnok, Tatabánya; Attendance: 3,000; Referees: Bócz, Wiedemann |
| 9 March 2024; 17:30 | 1× (yellow card) 3× (suspension) | Report | 2× (suspension) | Tatabányai Multifunkcionális Sportcsarnok, Tatabánya; Attendance: 3,000; Referees: Bócz, Wiedemann |

=== Bronze medal match ===
| 10 March 2024; 15:00 | DVSC Schaeffler | 34–29 | Motherson Mosonmagyaróvár | Tatabányai Multifunkcionális Sportcsarnok, Tatabánya; Attendance: 3,000; Referees: Paska, Vastag |
| 10 March 2024; 15:00 | N. Szabó 7 | (16–15) | E. Tóth 8 | Tatabányai Multifunkcionális Sportcsarnok, Tatabánya; Attendance: 3,000; Referees: Paska, Vastag |
| 10 March 2024; 15:00 | 1× (yellow card) 5× (suspension) | Report | 3× (suspension) | Tatabányai Multifunkcionális Sportcsarnok, Tatabánya; Attendance: 3,000; Referees: Paska, Vastag |

=== Final ===
| 10 March 2024; 18:00 | Győri Audi ETO KC | 23–25 | FTC-Rail Cargo Hungaria | Tatabányai Multifunkcionális Sportcsarnok, Tatabánya; Attendance: 4,500; Referees: Altmár, Horváth |
| 10 March 2024; 18:00 | Gros, Kristiansen 5 | (13–11) | Lekic 7 | Tatabányai Multifunkcionális Sportcsarnok, Tatabánya; Attendance: 4,500; Referees: Altmár, Horváth |
| 10 March 2024; 18:00 | 1× (yellow card) 3× (suspension) | Report | 2× (yellow card) 1× (suspension) | Tatabányai Multifunkcionális Sportcsarnok, Tatabánya; Attendance: 4,500; Referees: Altmár, Horváth |

== See also ==
- 2023–24 Nemzeti Bajnokság I
- 2023–24 Nemzeti Bajnokság I/B
- 2023–24 Nemzeti Bajnokság II
