= Elinore Johansson =

Swedish handball player (born 1996)

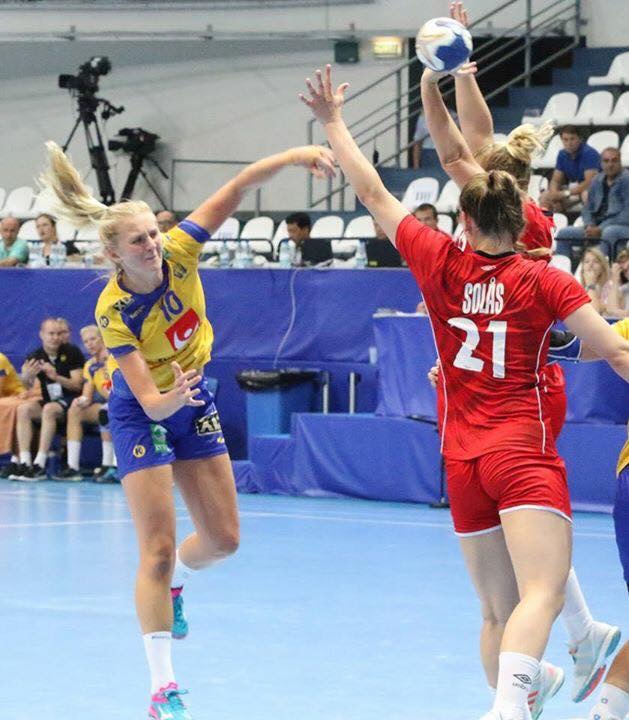
- Johansson in 2019

Personal information
- Full name: Marie Johanna Elinore Johansson
- Nationality: Swedish
- Born: 19 March 1996 (age 30) Hässleholm, Sweden
- Height: 1.79 m (5 ft 10 in)

Sport
- Sport: Handball
- Position: Right back
- Current club: TuS Metzingen

Youth career
- Years: Team
- 2011–2012: H 65 Höör

Senior clubs
- Years: Team
- 2012–2019: Lugi HF
- 2019–2021: Larvik HK
- 2021–2023: Storhamar HE
- 2023–2024: Debreceni VSC
- 2024–: TuS Metzingen
National team
Years	Team	Apps	(Gls)
2018–	Sweden	4	(4)

Marie Johanna Elinore Johansson (born 19 March 1996) is a Swedish handball player who plays for TuS Metzingen in the German Bundesliga and the Swedish national team.

She also represented Sweden in the 2013 European Women's U-17 Handball Championship in Poland, where the Swedish team won the final tournament, and at the 2015 Women's U-19 European Handball Championship in Spain, receiving the bronze medal.

Johansson made her debut on the Swedish national team on 16 June 2018, against Ukraine.

On 8 February 2021, it was announced that she had signed a 3-year contract with Storhamar HE in Norway.

== Achievements ==
- Svensk handbollselit:
  - Silver Medalist: 2012, 2013
- Norwegian League
  - Silver Medalist: 2021–22, 2022–23
