= Alexandra Töpfner =

Hungarian handball player (born 1996)

Personal information
- Nationality: Hungarian
- Born: 8 February 1996 (age 30) Szekszárd, Hungary
- Height: 1.70 m (5 ft 7 in)

Sport
- Sport: Handball
- Position: Right wing
- Current club: Debreceni VSC
- Number: 28

Youth career
- Years: Team
- 2007–2009: UKSE Szekszárd
- 2009–2011: Szekszárdi FGKC
- 2011–2012: UKSE Szekszárd
- 2012–2013: Szekszárdi FGKC
- 2013–2014: Veszprém Barabás KC

Senior clubs
- Years: Team
- 2014–2018: Mosonmagyaróvári KC SE
- 2018–2019: Kispest NKK
- 2019–2022: Alba Fehérvár KC
- 2022–2025: Debreceni VSC
- 2025–: CS Rapid București
National team
Years	Team	Apps	(Gls)
2022–	Hungary	19	(21)

Alexandra Töpfner (born 8 February 1996) is a Hungarian handballer for Debreceni VSC and the Hungary national team.

== Career ==
=== Club ===
Alexandra has been playing in UKSE Szekszárd since 2007. Two years later, she joined Szekszárdi FGKC, returned to UKSE Szekszárd in 2011, and played for Szekszárdi FGKC again in the 2012/2013 season. In 2013/2014 she played for the youth teams of Veszprém Barabás KC. In 2014, she transferred to Mosonmagyaróvári KC SE. Here, in her first season, she played for the second team of Mosonmagyaróvári KC SE in the Nemzeti Bajnokság I/B. She made her debut for Mosonmagyaróvári KC SE's first team in the Nemzeti Bajnokság I in 2016. At the end of that season, the team was relegated from the first division. The following year they won the second division championship, but Alexandra became a player for Nemzeti Bajnokság I/B Kispest NKK at the end of the season. She scored 97 goals for Kispest NKK in the 2018/2019 season, and was signed by first division Alba Fehérvár KC the following season. After 3 years, she transferred to the Debreceni VSC team. In the 2022/2023 season, she won the bronze medal in the championship and became the top scorer of his team, scoring 130 goals in 25 league matches. She also made his debut in the EHF European League in the 2022/2023 season, where she scored 23 goals in 6 matches. She participated in the EHF Champions League with Debreceni VSC in the 2023/2024 season. She scored 71 goals in 16 matches in the EHF Champions League. In the spring of 2025, it was announced that she would continue her career with the Romanian team CS Rapid București from the summer.

=== National team ===
She was included in the large squad of the 2021 World Women's Handball Championship, but in the end he will not become a member of the narrow squad. She made her debut in the Hungarian women's adult national team in October 2022 in Tatabánya in a warm-up match against the Romania women's national handball team (Hungary-Romania 33–28). She also participated in the 2022 European Women's Handball Championship, where the Hungarian team finished 11th (6 matches / 2 goals). She also participated in the 2023 World Women's Handball Championship, where the Hungarian team finished 10th (4 matches / 9 goals). He was included in the large squad of the 2024 European Women's Handball Championship, but in the end he will not become a member of the narrow squad. He was included in the large squad of the 2025 World Women's Handball Championship, but in the end he will not become a member of the narrow squad.

== Honours ==
=== Club ===
Mosonmagyaróvári KC SE

- Nemzeti Bajnokság I/B:
  - Gold: 2018

Debreceni VSC

- Nemzeti Bajnokság I:
  - Bronze: 2023
- Magyar Kupa
  - Bronze: 2023, 2024
