= Mirtill Petrus =

Hungarian handball player (born 2001)

Personal information
- Nationality: Hungarian
- Born: 14 November 2001 (age 24) Debrecen, Hungary
- Height: 1.68 m (5 ft 6 in)

Sport
- Sport: Handball
- Position: Left wing
- Current club: Debreceni VSC
- Number: 71

Youth career
- Years: Team
- 2014–2018: Debreceni VSC

Senior clubs
- Years: Team
- 2018–: Debreceni VSC
- 2019–2020: → NKK Balmazújváros (loan)
National team
Years	Team	Apps	(Gls)
2024–	Hungary	1	(0)
Medal record
European Championship
Bronze medal – third place	2024 Austria/Hungary/Switzerland

Mirtill Petrus (born 14 November 2001) is a Hungarian handballer for Debreceni VSC and the Hungary national team.

== Career ==
=== Club ===
Mirtill has been playing in Debreceni VSC since 2014. She made her debut in the Debreceni VSC first team in November 2018 in Nemzeti Bajnokság I. In the 2019/20 season, she played in Nemzeti Bajnokság I/B NKK Balmazújváros on loan. In the same season, she also made her debut in the international cup series for the Debreceni VSC team, scoring 2 goals in 4 matches in the EHF Cup. In the 2020/21 season, she and her team reached the finals of the Hungarian Cup, but they lost 29–23 to the Győri ETO KC team, thus winning the silver medal. In the 2023/24 season, she could also play in the EHF Champions League, scoring 26 goals in 16 games.

=== National team ===
She was included in the large squad of the 2023 World Women's Handball Championship, but in the end he will not become a member of the narrow squad. At the 2024 European Women's Handball Championship, she was included in the Hungarian squad after the semi-finals, replacing Gréta Márton, who fell ill. Her first international match was the semi-final against Norway. At the 2024 European Women's Handball Championship, the Hungarian team finished in 3rd place, Mirtill played in 1 match. He was included in the large squad of the 2025 World Women's Handball Championship, but in the end he will not become a member of the narrow squad.

== Honours ==
=== National team ===
- European Women's Handball Championship:
  - Bronze: 2024

=== Club ===
Debreceni VSC

- Nemzeti Bajnokság I:
  - Bronze: 2022, 2023
- Magyar Kupa
  - Silver: 2021
  - Bronze: 2023, 2024
