= Dóra Hornyák =

Hungarian handball player (born 1992)

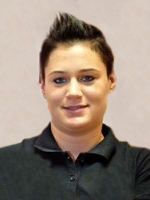

Personal information
- Nationality: Hungarian
- Born: 24 January 1992 (age 34) Debrecen, Hungary
- Height: 1.80 m (5 ft 11 in)

Sport
- Sport: Handball
- Position: Left back
- Current club: Debreceni VSC
- Number: 92

Senior clubs
- Years: Team
- 2005–2006: Nádudvari SE
- 2006–2011: Debreceni VSC
- 2011–2012: Veszprém Barabás KC
- 2012–2014: Győri ETO KC
- 2014–2015: Váci NKSE
- 2015–2020: Ferencvárosi TC
- 2020–2026: Debreceni VSC
National team
Years	Team	Apps	(Gls)
2012–	Hungary	38	(56)
Medal record
Junior European Championship
Silver medal – second place	2009 Hungary

Dóra Hornyák (born 24 January 1992) is a retired Hungarian handballer for Debreceni VSC and the Hungarian national team.

== Achievements ==
- Nemzeti Bajnokság I:
  - Gold Medallist: 2013, 2014
  - Silver Medallist: 2010, 2011, 2016, 2017, 2018
  - Bronze Medallist: 2009
- Magyar Kupa:
  - Gold Medallist: 2013, 2014, 2017
  - Silver Medallist: 2009, 2011
- EHF Champions League
  - Winner: 2013, 2014
- Junior European Championship:
  - Silver Medallist: 2009

== Individual awards ==
- Hungarian Youth Handballer of the Year: 2009, 2010

== Personal life ==
She is in a relationship with former handball player, Gergely Pál. She gave birth to their son, Bendegúz on 26 May 2019.
