= Miko Coffee =

Belgian coffee brand

Miko
- Type: Public
- Industry: B2B Coffee
- Founded: In 1801, Turnhout, Belgium
- Headquarters: Turnhout, Belgium
- Key people: Frans Van Tilborg, Managing Director
- Products: Whole Bean Coffee
- Revenue: ▲€111.16 million (2009)
- Number of employees: 631
- Subsidiaries: MikoPac, Mepaco, Miko Coffee Service
- Website: www.miko.eu

Miko Coffee is part of the Miko Group. It was established in 1801 by Leo Michielsen but they did not develop a coffee roasting business until 1900.. In 2004, they added Puro as business to business brand. The name is derived from a combination of the words "Michielsen" and "Koffie". In 2021, Miko Group acquired Dutch coffee vending operator Maas.
