= Gabrijela Bartulović =

Croatian handball player (born 1994)

Personal information
- Nationality: Croatian
- Born: 6 December 1994 (age 31) Zagreb, Croatia
- Height: 1.79 m (5 ft 10 1/2 in)

Sport
- Sport: Handball
- Position: Goalkeeper
- Current club: SCM Râmnicu Vâlcea
- Number: 94

Senior clubs
- Years: Team
- 2010–2017: RK Sesvete Agroproteinka
- 2017–2020: MKS Lublin
- 2020–2021: ŽRK Koka Varaždin
- 2021–2023: Dunaújvárosi Kohász KA
- 2023–2024: Debreceni VSC
- 2024–2025: Dunaújvárosi Kohász KA
- 2025–: SCM Râmnicu Vâlcea
National team
Years	Team	Apps	(Gls)
–	Croatia	19	(1)

Gabrijela Bartulović (née Bešen; born 6 December 1994) is a Croatian handball player for SCM Râmnicu Vâlcea and the Croatian national team.

She participated at the 2016 European Women's Handball Championship.

Her younger sister Lucija Bešen is also a handball player and, like Bartulović, also plays as a goalkeeper.
