= Catherine Gabriel =

French handball player (born 1994)

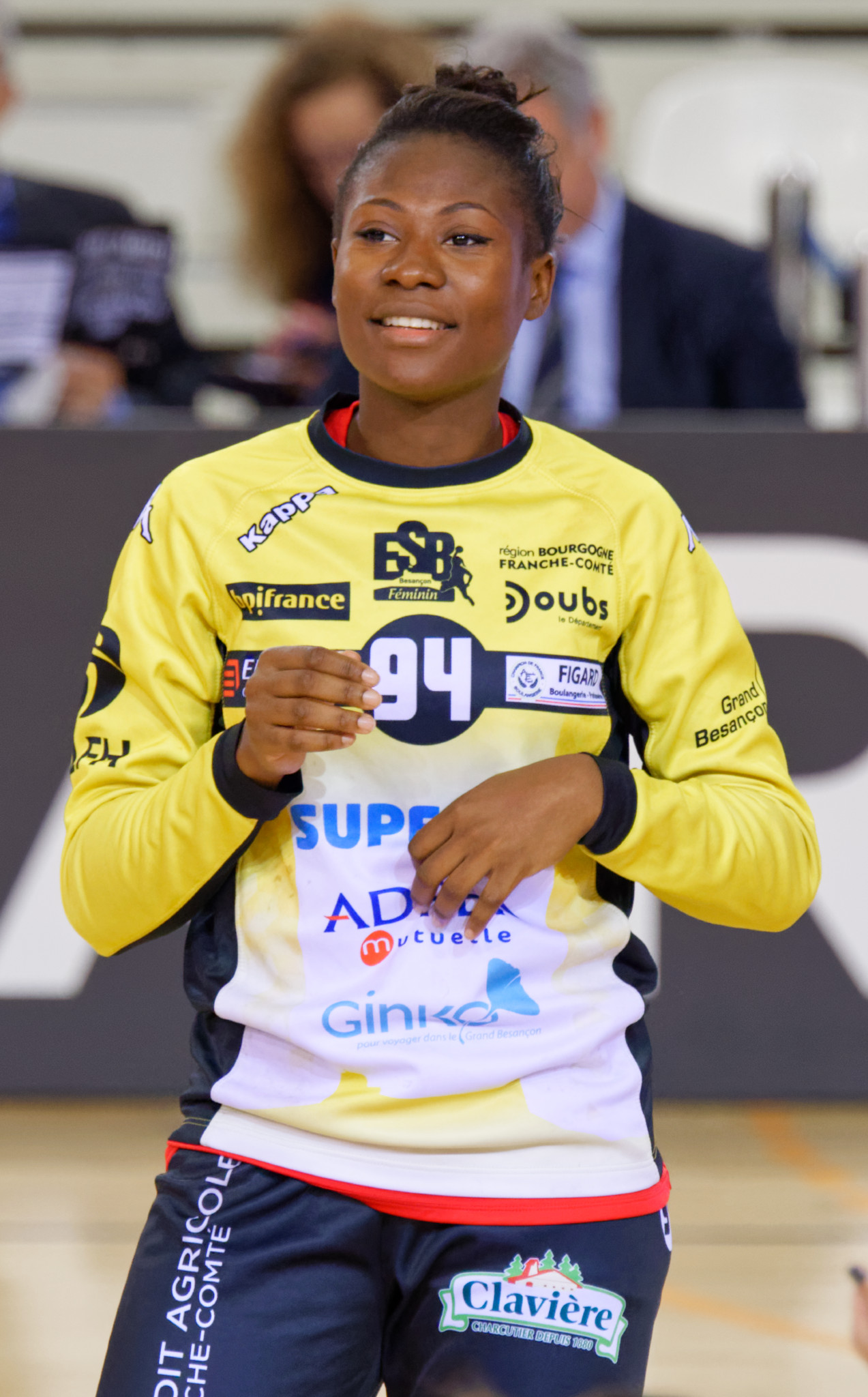

Personal information
- Nationality: French
- Born: 4 September 1994 (age 32) Yaoundé, Cameroon
- Height: 1.72 m (5 ft 8 in)

Sport
- Sport: Handball
- Position: Goalkeeper
- Current club: CSM București
- Number: 94

Senior clubs
- Years: Team
- 2012–2018: ESBF Besançon
- 2018–2020: Nantes Atlantique Handball
- 2020–2022: Paris 92
- 2022–2025: Debreceni VSC
- 2025–02/2026: Metz Handball
- 02/2026–06/2026: ESBF Besançon
- 07/2026–: CSM București
National team
Years	Team	Apps	(Gls)
2017–	France	21	(0)
Medal record
World Championship
Silver medal – second place	2021 Spain

Catherine Gabriel (born 4 September 1994) is a French handballer for CSM București and the French national team.

She represented France at the 2019 World Women's Handball Championship.

== Achievements ==
- Division 2:
  - Winner: 2015
