= Gréta Kácsor =

Hungarian handball player (born 2000)

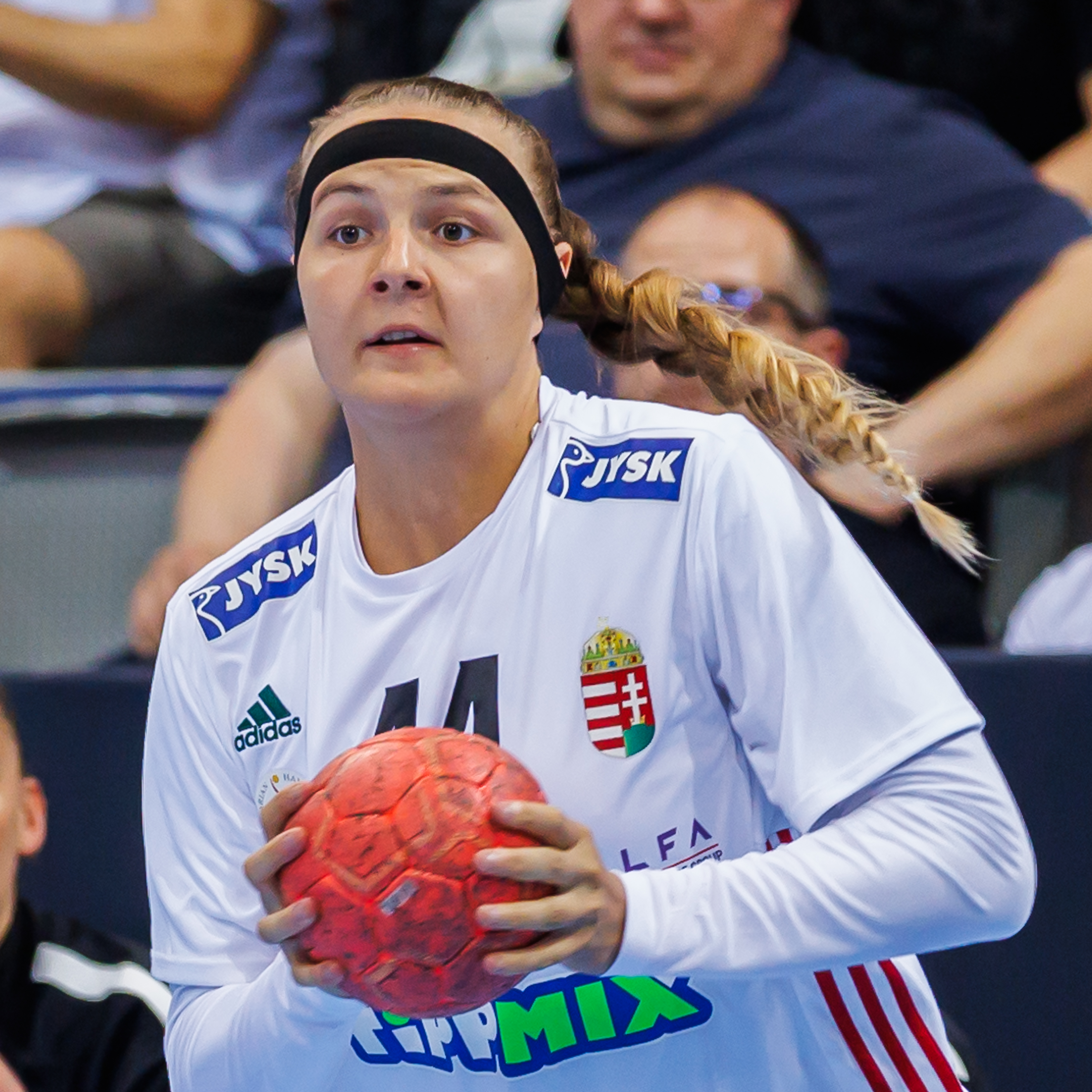
- Kácsor in 2024

Personal information
- Nationality: Hungarian
- Born: 24 April 2000 (age 26) Budapest, Hungary
- Height: 1.76 m (5 ft 9 in)

Sport
- Sport: Handball
- Position: Left back
- Current club: CSM Slatina
- Number: 44

Youth career
- Years: Team
- –2014: EURONOVEX USE
- 2014–2016: Váci NKSE

Senior clubs
- Years: Team
- 2016–2022: Váci NKSE
- 2022–2024: Debreceni VSC
- 2024–2025: Gloria Bistrița-Năsăud
- 2025–: CSM Slatina
National team
Years	Team	Apps	(Gls)
2020–	Hungary	50	(69)
Medal record
European Championship
Bronze medal – third place	2024 Austria/Hungary/Switzerland
Youth World Championship
Silver medal – second place	2018 Poland
Junior World Championship
Gold medal – first place	2018 Hungary
Junior European Championship
Gold medal – first place	2019 Hungary
Youth European Championship
Bronze medal – third place	2017 Slovakia
EYOF
Gold medal – first place	2017 Győr
- Updated on 16 December 2024

Gréta Kácsor (born 24 April 2000) is a Hungarian handballer for CSM Slatina and the Hungarian national team.

She made her international debut on 28 November 2020 against Sweden. She represented Hungary at the 2020 European Women's Handball Championship. At the 2024 European Championship she was part of the Hungarian team that won bronze medals, losing to Norway in semifinal and beating France in the third place play-off. This was the first Hungarian medals since 2012.

== Achievements ==
National team

- IHF Women's Junior World Championship:
  - Gold: 2018
- Junior European Championship:
  - Gold: 2019
- European Youth Olympic Festival:
  - Gold: 2017
- IHF Youth World Championship:
  - Silver: 2018
- Youth European Championship:
  - Bronze: 2017

== Awards and recognition ==
- Hungarian Youth Handballer of the Year: 2017, 2018
- All-Star Team Best Left Back of the Junior European Championship: 2019
