= Petra Vámos =

Hungarian handballer (born 2000)

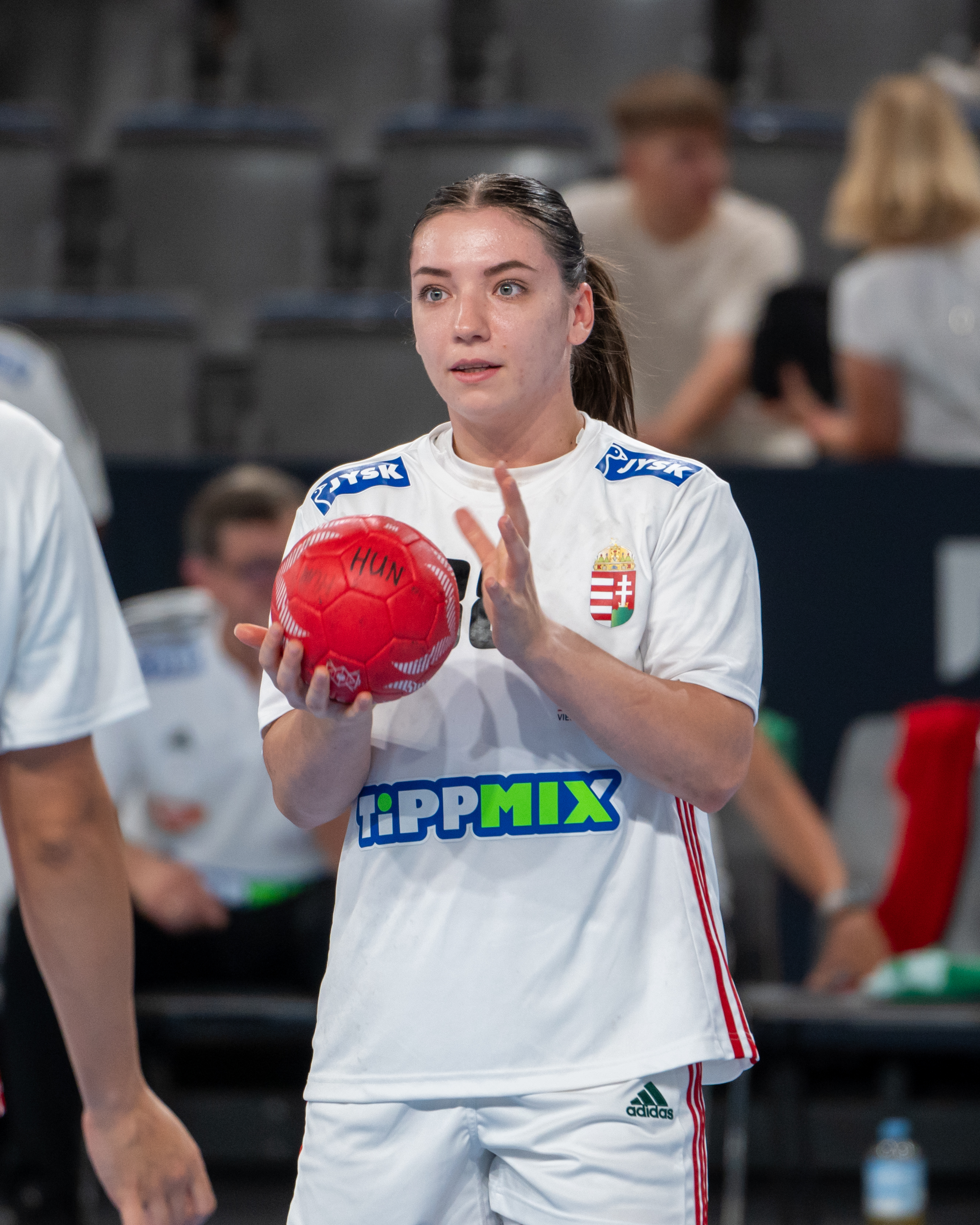

Personal information
- Nationality: Hungarian
- Born: 14 September 2000 (age 26) Ózd, Hungary
- Height: 1.75 m (5 ft 9 in)

Sport
- Sport: Handball
- Position: Centre back
- Current club: Metz Handball
- Number: 38

Youth career
- Years: Team
- –2019: NEKA

Senior clubs
- Years: Team
- 2019–2024: Debreceni VSC
- 2024–: Metz Handball
National team
Years	Team	Apps	(Gls)
2019–	Hungary	103	(278)
Medal record
European Championship
Bronze medal – third place	2024 Austria/Hungary/Switzerland
Youth World Championship
Silver medal – second place	2018 Poland
Junior European Championship
Gold medal – first place	2019 Hungary
Youth European Championship
Bronze medal – third place	2017 Slovakia
European Youth Summer Olympic Festival
Gold medal – first place	2017 Győr
- Updated on 10 December 2025

Petra Vámos (born 14 September 2000) is a Hungarian handballer for French topclub Metz Handball and the Hungarian national team.

She made her international debut on 22 November 2019 against Russia. Since then she represented Hungary at two European Championship (2022, 2024), and three World Championship (2019, 2021, 2023) tournaments. She also participated in the Tokyo Summer Olympics in 2020 and the Paris Summer Olympics in 2024, where the team finished 7th and 6th respectively. At the 2024 European Championship she was part of the Hungarian team that won bronze medals, losing to Norway in semifinal and beating France in the third place play-off. This was the first Hungarian medals since 2012.

== Achievements ==
National team

- European Handball Championship:
  - Bronze: 2024
- Junior European Championship:
  - Gold: 2019
- European Youth Olympic Festival:
  - Gold: 2017
- IHF Youth World Championship:
  - Silver: 2018
- Youth European Championship:
  - Bronze: 2017

== Individual awards ==
- Hungarian Junior Handballer of the Year: 2019
- Hungarian Handballer of the Year: 2025

== Personal life ==
She studies at the University of Debrecen. Her younger sister, Míra is also a professional handball player, and the two were teammates in Debrecen.
