= Szimonetta Planéta =

Hungarian handball player (born 1993)

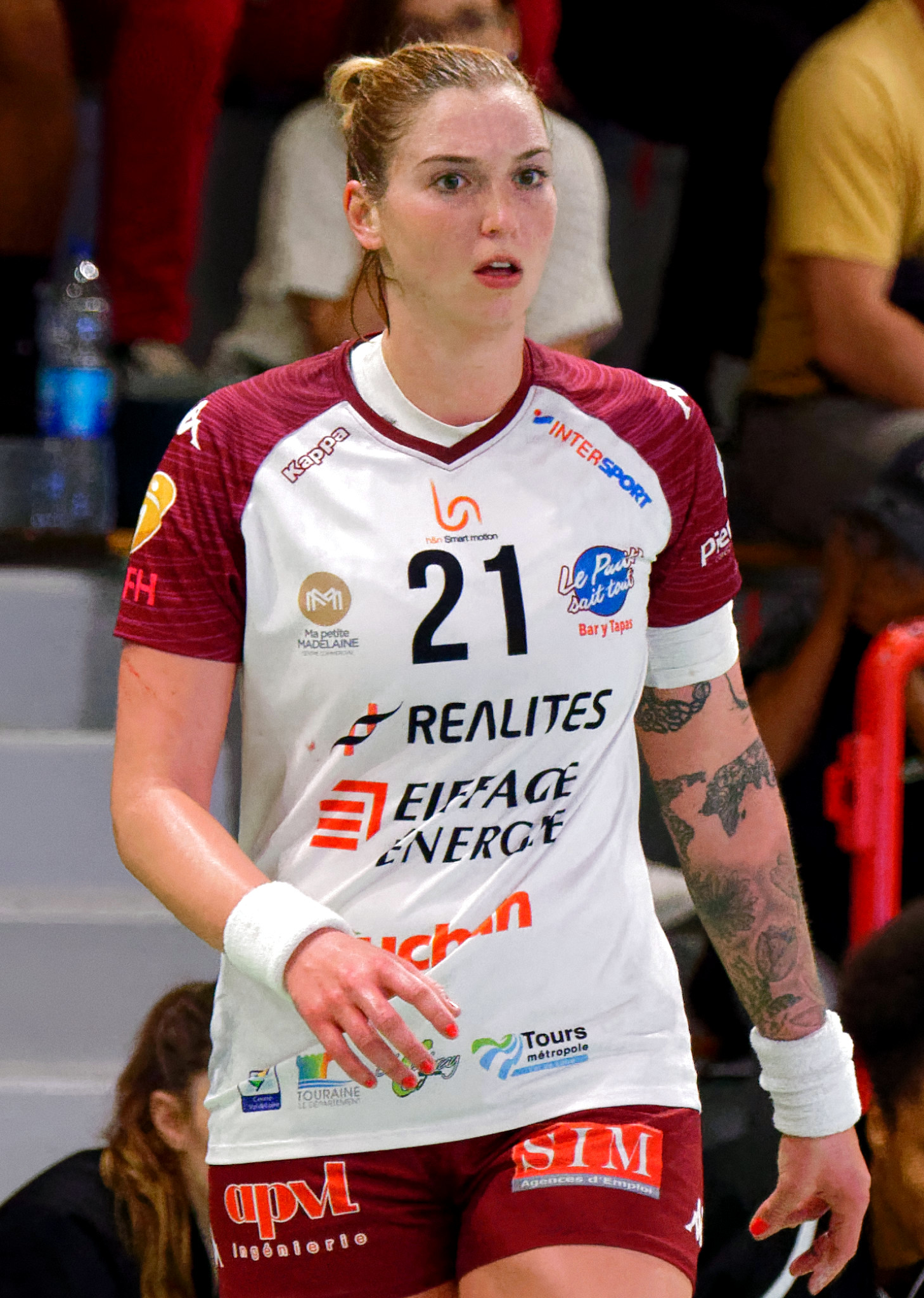
- Planéta in 2018

Personal information
- Nationality: Hungarian
- Born: 12 December 1993 (age 32) Kazincbarcika, Hungary
- Height: 1.98 m (6 ft 6 in)

Sport
- Sport: Handball
- Position: Right back
- Current club: MKS Lublin
- Number: 43

Youth career
- Years: Team
- 2006–2009: Győri ETO KC

Senior clubs
- Years: Team
- 2009–2017: Győri ETO KC
- 2012–2014: → Veszprém Barabás (loan)
- 2016–2017: → Thüringer HC (loan)
- 2017–2021: Chambray Touraine HB
- 2021–2024: Debreceni VSC
- 2024–2026: MKS Lublin
National team
Years	Team	Apps	(Gls)
2011–	Hungary	70	(91)
- Updated on 3 September 2024

Szimonetta Planéta (born 12 December 1993) is a Hungarian handballer for Polish club MKS Lublin and the Hungarian national team.

== Achievements ==
- Nemzeti Bajnokság I:
  - Winner: 2010, 2011, 2012
- Magyar Kupa:
  - Winner: 2010, 2011, 2012, 2015
- EHF Champions League:
  - Finalist: 2012
  - Semifinalist: 2010, 2011

== Awards and recognition ==
- All-Star Centre Back of the Møbelringen Cup: 2018
