= Jovana Jovović =

Serbian handball player (born 2001)

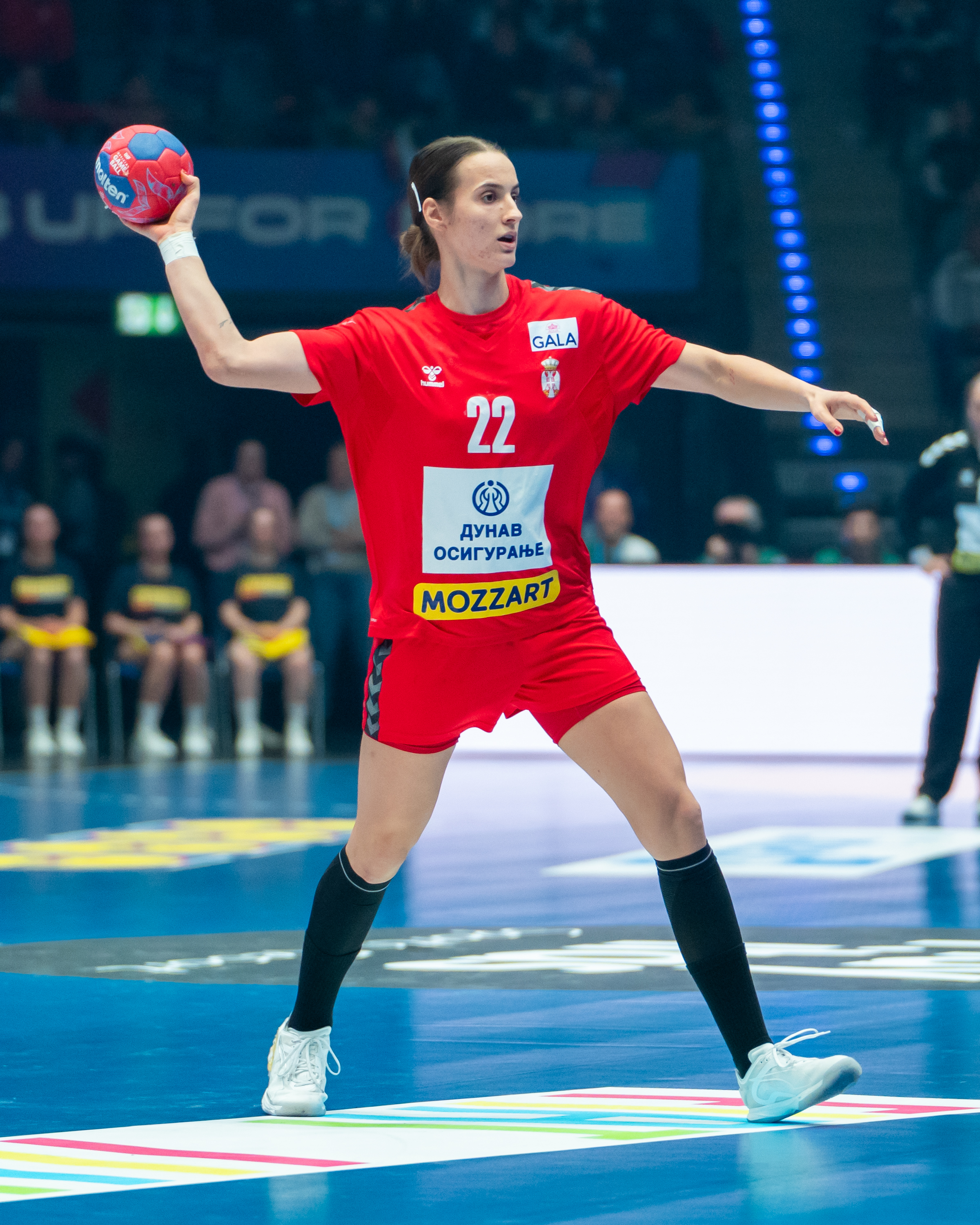
- Jovović in 2025

Personal information
- Nationality: Serbian / Hungarian
- Born: 4 December 2001 (age 24) Vrbas, FR Yugoslavia
- Height: 1.82 m (6 ft 0 in)

Sport
- Sport: Handball
- Position: Left back
- Current club: Debreceni VSC
- Number: 22

Senior clubs
- Years: Team
- 2017–2021: Dunaújvárosi Kohász KA
- 2021–2022.11.14.: Moyra-Budaörs Handball
- 2022.11.14.–: Debreceni VSC
National team
Years	Team	Apps	(Gls)
2019–	Serbia	38	(129)
Medal record
Mediterranean Games
Bronze medal – third place	2022 Oran	Team
- Updated on 26 October 2025

Jovana Jovović (Serbian Cyrillic: Јована Јововић; born 4 December 2001) is a Serbian handball player for Debreceni VSC and the Serbian national team.

She represented Serbia at the 2019 World Women's Handball Championship.

In 2019, she became a Hungarian citizen.
