= Eszter Tóth =

Hungarian handball player (born 1992)

Personal information
- Nationality: Hungarian
- Born: 27 October 1992 (age 33) Győr, Hungary
- Height: 1.80 m (5 ft 11 in)

Sport
- Sport: Handball
- Position: Centre back
- Current club: Mosonmagyaróvári KC SE
- Number: 2

Youth career
- Years: Team
- 2006–2009: Győri ETO KC

Senior clubs
- Years: Team
- 2009–2015: Győri ETO KC
- 2012–2015: → Veszprém BKC (loan)
- 2016–2020: MTK Budapest
- 2020–: Mosonmagyaróvári KC SE
National team
Years	Team	Apps	(Gls)
2020–	Hungary	19	(21)

Eszter Tóth (born 27 October 1992) is a Hungarian handballer for Mosonmagyaróvári KC SE and the Hungarian national team.

She represented Hungary at the 2020 European Women's Handball Championship.

== Achievements ==
- Nemzeti Bajnokság I:
  - Winner: 2010, 2011, 2012
- Magyar Kupa:
  - Winner: 2010, 2011, 2012
- EHF Champions League:
  - Finalist: 2012
  - Semifinalist: 2010, 2011
