= 2025–26 Debreceni VSC (women's handball) season =

DVSC Schaeffler sports season

DVSC Schaeffler
2025–26 season
- President: (Hungary) Zsolt Ábrók
- Manager: (Hungary) Zoltán Szilágyi
- Stadium: Hódos Imre Sports Hall, Debrecen
- Nemzeti Bajnokság I: (bronze) 3rd place
- Hungarian Cup: (silver) Runners-up
- Champions League: Playoff
- Top goalscorer: League: Toublanc, 130 goals All: Toublanc, 232 goals
- Biggest win: 27 goals, (46–19) vs NEKA (H), Nemzeti Bajnokság, R19; 25 March 2026
- Biggest defeat: 17 goals, (22–39) vs Győri ETO (A), Nemzeti Bajnokság, R12; 20 January 2026
Home colours	Away colours
- All statistics correct as of 31 May 2026.

The 2025–26 season is Debreceni VSC's 46th competitive and consecutive season in the Nemzeti Bajnokság I and 77th year in existence as a handball club. In addition to the domestic league, DVSC Schaeffler participated in this season's editions of the Magyar Kupa (domestic cup) and EHF Champions League after 4th position the previous Nemzeti Bajnokság (domestic league) season and the European Handball Federation on 24 June 2025 confirmed the upgrade requests to the EHF Champions League for the 2025/26 season.

Since August 2018 they are sponsored by Schaeffler Group, so the official name for the team is DVSC Schaeffler.

== Kits ==
Supplier: Kappa / Sponsor: Schaeffler

Home	Away	Third	Goalkeeper

== Players ==
=== Squad information ===
Goalkeepers (GK)

- 12 (Sweden) Jessica Ryde
- 93 (Poland) Adrianna Płaczek

Left wingers (LW)

- 24 (Hungary) Míra Vámos
- 71 (Hungary) Mirtill Petrus

Right wingers (RW)

- 3 (France) Alicia Toublanc
- 18 (Hungary) Vivien Grosch
- 26 (Hungary) Luca Ratalics

Line players (LP)

- 9 (Hungary) Kata Juhász
- 13 (Hungary) Petra Füzi-Tóvizi (c)

Left backs (LB)

- 14 (Austria) Ines Ivančok-Šoltić
- 22 (Serbia) Jovana Jovović
- 29 (Sweden) Kristin Thorleifsdóttir
- 92 (Hungary) Dóra Hornyák

Centre backs (CB)

- 19 (Sweden) Daniela de Jong
- 25 (Hungary) Liliána Csernyánszki
- 81 (Hungary) Nina Szabó

Right backs (RB)

- 5 (Hungary) Konszuéla Hámori
- 6 (France) Océane Sercien-Ugolin

=== Transfers ===
==== 2025–26 season ====
Transfers for the 2025–26 season

Joining

- (France) Alicia Toublanc (RW) (from (Romania) Vâlcea)
- (Sweden) Daniela de Jong (CB) (from (Romania) Vâlcea)
- (Poland) Adrianna Płaczek (GK) (from (France) Paris 92)
- (Austria) Ines Ivančok-Šoltić (LB) (from (Hungary) Szombathely)
- (Hungary) Gréta Majoros (GK) (from DVSC Academy)

Leaving

- (Netherlands) Tamara Haggerty (LP) End of contract
- (Hungary) Nikolett Tóth (CB) (to (Hungary) Vasas)
- (Hungary) Alexandra Töpfner (RW) (to (Romania) Rapid București)
- (Hungary) Veronika Fodor (LP) (to (Hungary) Kozármisleny KA)
- (Hungary) Dorina Kelemen (CB) (to (Hungary) Kozármisleny KA)
- (Hungary) Csenge Kiss (RW) (to (Hungary) NEKA)
- (France) Catherine Gabriel (GK) (to (France) Metz)

==== 2026–27 season ====
Transfers for the 2026–27 season

Joining

- (Hungary) Luca Ratalics (RW) (from DVSC Academy)
- (Poland) Monika Kobylinska (RW) (to (Romania) Gloria Bistrița)

Leaving

- (Hungary) Vivien Grosch (RW) (to (Hungary) MTK)
- (France) Océane Sercien-Ugolin (RB) TBD
- (Sweden) Daniela de Jong (CB) TBD

=== Contract renewals ===
- (Hungary) Mirtill Petrus (LW) until 30 June 2027
- (Hungary) Petra Füzi-Tóvizi (LP) until 30 June 2027
- (Serbia) Jovana Jovović (LB) until 30 June 2027
- (Hungary) Konszuéla Hámori (RB) until 30 June 2026
- (Hungary) Míra Vámos (LW) until 30 June 2027
- (Hungary) Vivien Grosch (RW) until 30 June 2026 or 2027
- (Hungary) Nina Szabó (CB) until 30 June 2027
- (Hungary) Dóra Hornyák (LB) until 30 June 2026
- (Sweden) Kristin Thorleifsdóttir (LB) until 30 June 2026 and +1 year
- (Hungary) Kata Juhász (LP) until 30 June 2028
- (Hungary) Liliána Csernyánszki (CB) until 30 June 2028

== Club ==
=== Technical Staff ===
Position	Staff member
President	(Hungary) Zsolt Ábrók
Technical manager	(Hungary) Marietta Vágó
Head coach	(Hungary) Zoltán Szilágyi
Assistant coach	(Hungary) Kitti Kudor
Goalkeeping coach	(Slovenia) Grega Karpan
Team doctor	(Hungary) Dr. Tamás Bazsó
Physiotherapist	(Hungary) Attila Kazsimér
Physiotherapist	(Hungary) Laura Kerék
Fitness coach	(Hungary) Örs Sebestyén
Video Analytics	(Hungary) Attila Kun

Source: Coaches, Management

=== Uniform ===
- Supplier: (Italy) Kappa
- Main sponsor: Shaeffler / tippmix / Tranzit-Food / City of Debrecen / Manz
- Back sponsor: Volkswagen / Globus / Cívis Ház
- Arm sponsor: BCB Higiénia / EHF
- Shorts sponsor: Miko Coffee / CTS Informatika / MySeyu / Team&Event / tippmix

== Friendlies matches ==
The first training of the season will be on 14 July 2025.

=== Pre-season ===
25 July 2025; 15:30	DVSC Schaeffler	33–30	(Romania) Slatina	Hódos Imre Sports Hall, Debrecen; Attendance: 350; Referees: Fibec, Győr
25 July 2025; 15:30	Sercien-Ugolin 6	(15–14)		Hódos Imre Sports Hall, Debrecen; Attendance: 350; Referees: Fibec, Győr
25 July 2025; 15:30	7× (suspension)	Report	2× (suspension)	Hódos Imre Sports Hall, Debrecen; Attendance: 350; Referees: Fibec, Győr

29 July 2025; 15:30	DVSC Schaeffler	41–16	(Slovakia) Michalovce	Hódos Imre Sports Hall, Debrecen; Attendance: 350; Referees: D. Juhász, Á. Rontó
29 July 2025; 15:30	Toublanc, Füzi-Tóvizi, Vámos 6	(18–8)		Hódos Imre Sports Hall, Debrecen; Attendance: 350; Referees: D. Juhász, Á. Rontó
29 July 2025; 15:30		Report		Hódos Imre Sports Hall, Debrecen; Attendance: 350; Referees: D. Juhász, Á. Rontó

1 August 2025; 16:00	MOL Esztergom (Hungary)	24–30	DVSC Schaeffler	Lakitelek; Attendance: 300; Referees: Gy. Sándor, B. Szabó
1 August 2025; 16:00	Faragó 6 (3)	(10–16)	Toublanc 9 (4)	Lakitelek; Attendance: 300; Referees: Gy. Sándor, B. Szabó
1 August 2025; 16:00		Report		Lakitelek; Attendance: 300; Referees: Gy. Sándor, B. Szabó

==== Constantin Tita Memorial Tournament – Vâlcea (ROU) ====
8 August 2025; 18:15 (19:15 EEST (UTC+3))	Vâlcea (Romania)	27–30	DVSC Schaeffler	Traian Sports Hall, Râmnicu Vâlcea (Romania); Attendance: 500
8 August 2025; 18:15 (19:15 EEST (UTC+3))		(17–13)	Toublanc 8 (6)	Traian Sports Hall, Râmnicu Vâlcea (Romania); Attendance: 500
8 August 2025; 18:15 (19:15 EEST (UTC+3))	2× (suspension)	Report	3× (suspension)	Traian Sports Hall, Râmnicu Vâlcea (Romania); Attendance: 500

9 August 2025; 17:15 (18:15 EEST (UTC+3))	Rapid (Romania)	35–31	DVSC Schaeffler	Traian Sports Hall, Râmnicu Vâlcea (Romania); Attendance: 300
9 August 2025; 17:15 (18:15 EEST (UTC+3))		(19–17)	Thorleifsdóttir 7	Traian Sports Hall, Râmnicu Vâlcea (Romania); Attendance: 300
9 August 2025; 17:15 (18:15 EEST (UTC+3))	1× (suspension)	Report	4× (suspension)	Traian Sports Hall, Râmnicu Vâlcea (Romania); Attendance: 300

15 August 2025; 15:00	FTC-Rail Cargo Hungaria (Hungary)	28–26	DVSC Schaeffler	Elek Gyula Aréna, Budapest; Attendance: 700; Referees: György Sándor, Balázs Szabó
15 August 2025; 15:00	Vogel 5	(13–12)	Sercien-Ugolin 6	Elek Gyula Aréna, Budapest; Attendance: 700; Referees: György Sándor, Balázs Szabó
15 August 2025; 15:00	2× (suspension)	Report	3× (suspension)	Elek Gyula Aréna, Budapest; Attendance: 700; Referees: György Sándor, Balázs Szabó

==== 2nd Kermann IT International tournament – Debrecen (HUN) ====
22 August 2025; 18:00	DVSC Schaeffler	39–19	(Poland) Lublin	Hódos Imre Sports Hall, Debrecen; Attendance: 800; Referees: Bócz, Wiedemann
22 August 2025; 18:00	Sercien-Ugolin 10 (4)	(23–11)	Wieckowska 7	Hódos Imre Sports Hall, Debrecen; Attendance: 800; Referees: Bócz, Wiedemann
22 August 2025; 18:00	1× (suspension)	Report	1× (suspension)	Hódos Imre Sports Hall, Debrecen; Attendance: 800; Referees: Bócz, Wiedemann

23 August 2025; 20:00	DVSC Schaeffler	23–28	(Hungary) FTC-Rail Cargo Hungaria	Hódos Imre Sports Hall, Debrecen; Attendance: 1,100; Referees: K. Altmár, M. Horváth
23 August 2025; 20:00	Füzi-Tóvizi 6	(11–15)	Malastein 6 (3)	Hódos Imre Sports Hall, Debrecen; Attendance: 1,100; Referees: K. Altmár, M. Horváth
23 August 2025; 20:00	5× (suspension)	Report	6× (suspension)	Hódos Imre Sports Hall, Debrecen; Attendance: 1,100; Referees: K. Altmár, M. Horváth

MVP of the tournament
Petra Füzi-Tóvizi (Debrecen)
Top scorer of the tournament
Océane Sercien-Ugolin (Debrecen)
Best goalkeeper of the tournament
Laura Glauser (Ferencváros)

== Competitions ==
=== Overall record ===
In italics, we indicate the Last match and the Final position achieved in competition(s) that have not yet been completed.

Competition	First match	Last match	Starting round	Final position	Record							
Competition	First match	Last match	Starting round	Final position	Pld	W	D	L	GF	GA	GD	Win %
Nemzeti Bajnokság I	3 September 2025	31 May 2026	Round 1	(bronze) 3rd place	26	22	0	4	862	611	+251	84.62
Magyar Kupa	11 March 2026	3 May 2026	Quarter-final	(silver) Runners-up	3	2	0	1	88	80	+8	66.67
EHF Champions League	7 September 2025	29 March 2026	Matchday 1	Playoff	16	6	1	9	474	499	−25	37.50
Total					45	30	1	14	1,424	1,190	+234	66.67

Last updated: 31 May 2026 (completed)
Source: Competitions

=== Nemzeti Bajnokság I ===
==== League table ====
Pos	Team	Pld	W	D	L	GF	GA	GD	Pts	Qualification or relegation
1	Győri Audi ETO (C)	26	25	1	0	974	613	+361	51	Qualification for the Champions League group stage
2	FTC-Rail Cargo Hungaria	26	24	1	1	911	635	+276	49	Qualification for the Champions League group stage
3	DVSC Schaeffler	26	22	0	4	862	611	+251	44	Qualification for the European League second qualifying round
4	MOL Esztergom	26	18	2	6	850	680	+170	38	
5	Vác	26	16	1	9	780	706	+74	33	
6	Alba Fehérvár	26	14	1	11	714	671	+43	29	
7	Kisvárda Master Good	26	12	0	14	672	730	−58	24	
8	Motherson Mosonmagyaróvár	26	10	3	13	719	729	−10	23	
9	Moyra-Budaörs Handball	26	9	3	14	707	751	−44	21	
10	Vasas	26	7	3	16	699	763	−64	17	
11	Szombathely	26	7	3	16	717	818	−101	17	
12	NEKA (Budapest)	26	6	0	20	650	827	−177	12	
13	Kozármisleny (R)	26	2	0	24	605	890	−285	4	Relegation to the Nemzeti Bajnokság I/B
14	DKKA (Dunaújváros) (R)	26	0	2	24	547	983	−436	2	Relegation to the Nemzeti Bajnokság I/B

Source: Hungarian Handball Federation (in Hungarian), Flashscore
Rules for classification: 1) Points; 2) Head-to-head points; 3) Head-to-head goal difference; 4) Goal difference; 5) Goals scored; 6) Matches won; 7) Draw (Note: Head-to-head record is used only after all the matches between the teams in question have been played)
(C) Champions; (R) Relegated

==== Results by round ====
Match	1	2	3	4	5	6	7	8	9	10	11	12	13	14	15	16	17	18	19	20	21	22	23	24	25	26
Ground	A	H	A	H	A	A	H	A	H	A	H	A	H	H	A	H	A	H	H	A	H	A	H	A	H	A
Result	W	W	W	W	W	W	W	W	W	W	L	L	W	W	W	W	W	W	W	W	W	W	W	L	L	W
Position	3	3	3	3	2	2	2	2	2	2	3	3	3	3	3	3	3	3	3	3	3	3	3	3	3	3
Points	2	4	6	8	10	12	14	16	18	20	20	20	22	24	26	28	30	32	34	36	38	40	42	42	42	44
Details	d	d	d	d	d	d	d	d	d	d	d	d	d	d	d	d	d	d	d	d	d	d	d	d	d	d

Updated to match(es) played on 31 May 2026 (completed). Source: Matches
A = Away; H = Home; W = Win; D = Draw; L = Loss

==== Matches ====
Win Draw Loss Fixtures Postponed

Round 1; 3 September 2025; 18:00 CEST	Alba Fehérvár	23–33	DVSC Schaeffler	Köfém Sportcsarnok, Székesfehérvár; Attendance: 450; Referees: Hajdu-Hársfalvi, Mórocz
Round 1; 3 September 2025; 18:00 CEST	K. Szabó 6 (3)	(13–16)	Sercien-Ugolin 7 (3)	Köfém Sportcsarnok, Székesfehérvár; Attendance: 450; Referees: Hajdu-Hársfalvi, Mórocz
Round 1; 3 September 2025; 18:00 CEST	5× (suspension)	Report	1× (yellow card) 4× (suspension)	Köfém Sportcsarnok, Székesfehérvár; Attendance: 450; Referees: Hajdu-Hársfalvi, Mórocz

Round 2; 10 September 2025; 18:00 CEST	DVSC Schaeffler	31–21	Vasas SC	Hódos Imre Sports Hall, Debrecen; Attendance: 700; Referees: Bujdosó, V. Horváth
Round 2; 10 September 2025; 18:00 CEST	Sercien-Ugolin 6 (2)	(16–11)	Szilovics 5	Hódos Imre Sports Hall, Debrecen; Attendance: 700; Referees: Bujdosó, V. Horváth
Round 2; 10 September 2025; 18:00 CEST	5× (suspension)	Report	2× (suspension) 1× (red card)	Hódos Imre Sports Hall, Debrecen; Attendance: 700; Referees: Bujdosó, V. Horváth

Round 3; 24 September 2025; 18:00 CEST	MOL Esztergom	29–32	DVSC Schaeffler	Suzuki Aréna, Esztergom; Attendance: 900; Referees: F. Nagy, Túróczy
Round 3; 24 September 2025; 18:00 CEST	Hajtai 5	(16–18)	Sercien-Ugolin 11 (6)	Suzuki Aréna, Esztergom; Attendance: 900; Referees: F. Nagy, Túróczy
Round 3; 24 September 2025; 18:00 CEST	3× (suspension)	Report	2× (yellow card) 4× (suspension)	Suzuki Aréna, Esztergom; Attendance: 900; Referees: F. Nagy, Túróczy

Round 4; 1 October 2025; 18:00 CEST	DVSC Schaeffler	35–25	Dunaújvárosi Kohász KA	Hódos Imre Sports Hall, Debrecen; Attendance: 700; Referees: Gy. Sándor, B. Szabó
Round 4; 1 October 2025; 18:00 CEST	Sercien-Ugolin 6 (1)	(16–5)	Kellermann 5 (1)	Hódos Imre Sports Hall, Debrecen; Attendance: 700; Referees: Gy. Sándor, B. Szabó
Round 4; 1 October 2025; 18:00 CEST	1× (yellow card) 1× (suspension)	Report	1× (suspension)	Hódos Imre Sports Hall, Debrecen; Attendance: 700; Referees: Gy. Sándor, B. Szabó

Round 5; 11 October 2025; 17:00 CEST	Moyra-Budaörs Handball	21–26	DVSC Schaeffler	Városi Sportcsarnok, Budapest; Attendance: 420; Referees: G. Kiu, T. Kiu
Round 5; 11 October 2025; 17:00 CEST	Szöllősi-Schatzl, Kármán 4	(9–10)	Sercien-Ugolin 4	Városi Sportcsarnok, Budapest; Attendance: 420; Referees: G. Kiu, T. Kiu
Round 5; 11 October 2025; 17:00 CEST	3× (suspension)	Report	2× (suspension)	Városi Sportcsarnok, Budapest; Attendance: 420; Referees: G. Kiu, T. Kiu

Round 6; 22 October 2025; 17:00 CEST	Nemzeti Kézilabda Akadémia	17–36	DVSC Schaeffler	NEKA Csarnok, Balatonboglár; Attendance: 167; Referees: Hargitai, Markó
Round 6; 22 October 2025; 17:00 CEST	Berei 7	(11–16)	Toublanc 7, Csernyánszki 7 (3)	NEKA Csarnok, Balatonboglár; Attendance: 167; Referees: Hargitai, Markó
Round 6; 22 October 2025; 17:00 CEST	1× (suspension)	Report	1× (yellow card) 3× (suspension)	NEKA Csarnok, Balatonboglár; Attendance: 167; Referees: Hargitai, Markó

Round 7; 29 October 2025; 18:00 CET	DVSC Schaeffler	42–22	Szombathely	Hódos Imre Sports Hall, Debrecen; Attendance: 1,050; Referees: Paska, Vastag
Round 7; 29 October 2025; 18:00 CET	Sercien-Ugolin 7 (5)	(21–13)	Pődör 7 (1)	Hódos Imre Sports Hall, Debrecen; Attendance: 1,050; Referees: Paska, Vastag
Round 7; 29 October 2025; 18:00 CET	5× (suspension)	Report	1× (suspension)	Hódos Imre Sports Hall, Debrecen; Attendance: 1,050; Referees: Paska, Vastag

Round 8; 12 November 2025; 19:00 CET	Motherson-Mosonmagyaróvár	22–26	DVSC Schaeffler	UFM Aréna, Mosonmagyaróvár; Attendance: 920; Referees: Bócz, Wiedemann
Round 8; 12 November 2025; 19:00 CET	Wolfs 6	(11–11)	three players' 5	UFM Aréna, Mosonmagyaróvár; Attendance: 920; Referees: Bócz, Wiedemann
Round 8; 12 November 2025; 19:00 CET	4× (suspension) 1× (red card)	Report	6× (suspension)	UFM Aréna, Mosonmagyaróvár; Attendance: 920; Referees: Bócz, Wiedemann

Round 9; 30 December 2025; 18:00 CET	DVSC Schaeffler	38–20	Kisvárda Master Good SE	Hódos Imre Sports Hall, Debrecen; Attendance: 1,004; Referees: Haskó, Natkai
Round 9; 30 December 2025; 18:00 CET	Toublanc 7	(20–10)	Poczetnyik 6	Hódos Imre Sports Hall, Debrecen; Attendance: 1,004; Referees: Haskó, Natkai
Round 9; 30 December 2025; 18:00 CET		Report	1× (suspension)	Hódos Imre Sports Hall, Debrecen; Attendance: 1,004; Referees: Haskó, Natkai

Round 10; 5 January 2026; 18:00 CET	DVSC Schaeffler	35–24	Vác	Hódos Imre Sports Hall, Debrecen; Attendance: 900; Referees: G. Kiu, T. Kiu
Round 10; 5 January 2026; 18:00 CET	Hámori 7	(15–14)	Afentaler 11	Hódos Imre Sports Hall, Debrecen; Attendance: 900; Referees: G. Kiu, T. Kiu
Round 10; 5 January 2026; 18:00 CET	6× (suspension)	Report	1× (yellow card) 5× (suspension)	Hódos Imre Sports Hall, Debrecen; Attendance: 900; Referees: G. Kiu, T. Kiu

Round 11; 14 January 2026; 18:00 CET	DVSC Schaeffler	29–35	FTC-Rail Cargo Hungaria	Hódos Imre Sports Hall, Debrecen; Attendance: 1,800; Referees: Altmár, M. Horváth
Round 11; 14 January 2026; 18:00 CET	Jovović 10	(15–18)	Dmitrieva, Malestein 7	Hódos Imre Sports Hall, Debrecen; Attendance: 1,800; Referees: Altmár, M. Horváth
Round 11; 14 January 2026; 18:00 CET	1× (yellow card) 2× (suspension)	Report	1× (yellow card)	Hódos Imre Sports Hall, Debrecen; Attendance: 1,800; Referees: Altmár, M. Horváth

Round 12; 20 January 2026; 18:00 CET	Győri Audi ETO KC	39–22	DVSC Schaeffler	Audi Aréna, Győr; Attendance: 2,636; Referees: Hargitai, Markó
Round 12; 20 January 2026; 18:00 CET	three players 5	(20–7)	M. Vámos 5	Audi Aréna, Győr; Attendance: 2,636; Referees: Hargitai, Markó
Round 12; 20 January 2026; 18:00 CET	1× (yellow card) 4× (suspension)	Report	1× (suspension) 1× (red card)	Audi Aréna, Győr; Attendance: 2,636; Referees: Hargitai, Markó

Round 13; 31 January 2026; 18:00 CET	DVSC Schaeffler	33–15	Kozármisleny KA	Hódos Imre Sports Hall, Debrecen; Attendance: 650; Referees: Bátori, Szécsi
Round 13; 31 January 2026; 18:00 CET	M. Vámos 6	(18–8)	three players 3	Hódos Imre Sports Hall, Debrecen; Attendance: 650; Referees: Bátori, Szécsi
Round 13; 31 January 2026; 18:00 CET	1× (yellow card) 3× (suspension)	Report	1× (yellow card) 1× (suspension)	Hódos Imre Sports Hall, Debrecen; Attendance: 650; Referees: Bátori, Szécsi

Round 14; 4 February 2026; 18:00 CET	DVSC Schaeffler	33–22	Alba Fehérvár	Hódos Imre Sports Hall, Debrecen; Attendance: 990; Referees: Paska, Vastag
Round 14; 4 February 2026; 18:00 CET	Petrus 8	(17–9)	Costa Moreno 4	Hódos Imre Sports Hall, Debrecen; Attendance: 990; Referees: Paska, Vastag
Round 14; 4 February 2026; 18:00 CET	4× (suspension)	Report	5× (suspension)	Hódos Imre Sports Hall, Debrecen; Attendance: 990; Referees: Paska, Vastag

Round 15; 18 February 2026; 18:00 CET	Vasas SC	22–33	DVSC Schaeffler	Sterbinszky Amália Kézilabdacsarnok, Budapest; Attendance: 340; Referees: Bócz, Wiedemann
Round 15; 18 February 2026; 18:00 CET	N. Nagy 5	(11–17)	Tóvizi 6	Sterbinszky Amália Kézilabdacsarnok, Budapest; Attendance: 340; Referees: Bócz, Wiedemann
Round 15; 18 February 2026; 18:00 CET		Report	4× (suspension)	Sterbinszky Amália Kézilabdacsarnok, Budapest; Attendance: 340; Referees: Bócz, Wiedemann

Round 16; 28 February 2026; 15:00 CET	DVSC Schaeffler	36–25	MOL Esztergom	Hódos Imre Sports Hall, Debrecen; Attendance: 1,300; Referees: Gy. Sándor, B. Szabó
Round 16; 28 February 2026; 15:00 CET	Toublanc 11	(18–11)	Faragó 7	Hódos Imre Sports Hall, Debrecen; Attendance: 1,300; Referees: Gy. Sándor, B. Szabó
Round 16; 28 February 2026; 15:00 CET	3× (suspension)	Report	5× (suspension)	Hódos Imre Sports Hall, Debrecen; Attendance: 1,300; Referees: Gy. Sándor, B. Szabó

Round 17; 14 March 2026; 17:00 CET	Dunaújvárosi Kohász KA	17–40	DVSC Schaeffler	Városi Sportcsarnok, Dunaújváros; Attendance: 150; Referees: T. Kovács, Mándli
Round 17; 14 March 2026; 17:00 CET	Sztankó 5	(5–18)	Sercien-Ugolin 8 (2)	Városi Sportcsarnok, Dunaújváros; Attendance: 150; Referees: T. Kovács, Mándli
Round 17; 14 March 2026; 17:00 CET	1× (suspension)	Report	1× (yellow card) 1× (suspension)	Városi Sportcsarnok, Dunaújváros; Attendance: 150; Referees: T. Kovács, Mándli

Round 18; 17 March 2026; 18:00 CET	DVSC Schaeffler	37–27	Moyra-Budaörs Handball	Hódos Imre Sports Hall, Debrecen; Attendance: 500; Referees: Hajdu-Hársfalvi, Mórocz
Round 18; 17 March 2026; 18:00 CET	Sercien-Ugolin 6 (6)	(18–13)	Szekerczés 6 (4)	Hódos Imre Sports Hall, Debrecen; Attendance: 500; Referees: Hajdu-Hársfalvi, Mórocz
Round 18; 17 March 2026; 18:00 CET	1× (yellow card) 2× (suspension)	Report	3× (suspension)	Hódos Imre Sports Hall, Debrecen; Attendance: 500; Referees: Hajdu-Hársfalvi, Mórocz

Round 19; 25 March 2026; 18:00 CET	DVSC Schaeffler	46–19	Nemzeti Kézilabda Akadémia	Hódos Imre Sports Hall, Debrecen; Attendance: 500; Referees: Haskó, Natkai
Round 19; 25 March 2026; 18:00 CET	Toublanc 11 (2)	(26–8)	Utasi 5	Hódos Imre Sports Hall, Debrecen; Attendance: 500; Referees: Haskó, Natkai
Round 19; 25 March 2026; 18:00 CET	1× (yellow card) 1× (suspension)	Report	1× (yellow card) 2× (suspension)	Hódos Imre Sports Hall, Debrecen; Attendance: 500; Referees: Haskó, Natkai

Round 20; 4 April 2026; 18:00 CEST	Szombathely	23–28	DVSC Schaeffler	Haladás Sportkomplexum, Szombathely; Attendance: 444
Round 20; 4 April 2026; 18:00 CEST	Smetková 5	(11–13)	Toublanc, Ivančok-Šoltić 5	Haladás Sportkomplexum, Szombathely; Attendance: 444
Round 20; 4 April 2026; 18:00 CEST	1× (suspension)	Report	2× (yellow card) 5× (suspension)	Haladás Sportkomplexum, Szombathely; Attendance: 444

Round 21; 18 April 2026; 18:00 CEST	DVSC Schaeffler	36–23	Motherson Mosonmagyaróvár	Hódos Imre Sports Hall, Debrecen; Attendance: 1,250; Referees: G. Kiu, T. Kiu
Round 21; 18 April 2026; 18:00 CEST	Toublanc 7	(19–11)	G. Tóth 5	Hódos Imre Sports Hall, Debrecen; Attendance: 1,250; Referees: G. Kiu, T. Kiu
Round 21; 18 April 2026; 18:00 CEST	1× (yellow card) 3× (suspension)	Report	1× (yellow card) 4× (suspension)	Hódos Imre Sports Hall, Debrecen; Attendance: 1,250; Referees: G. Kiu, T. Kiu

Round 22; 25 April 2026; 18:00 CEST	Kisvárda Master Good SE	19–31	DVSC Schaeffler	Halasy Gyula Városi Sportcsarnok, Kisvárda; Attendance: 305; Referees: Garai, Varasdi
Round 22; 25 April 2026; 18:00 CEST	three players' 3	(6–15)	Toublanc 9 (2)	Halasy Gyula Városi Sportcsarnok, Kisvárda; Attendance: 305; Referees: Garai, Varasdi
Round 22; 25 April 2026; 18:00 CEST		Report	2× (suspension)	Halasy Gyula Városi Sportcsarnok, Kisvárda; Attendance: 305; Referees: Garai, Varasdi

Round 23; 9 May 2026; 15:45 CEST	Vác	23–33	DVSC Schaeffler	Városi Sportcsarnok, Vác; Attendance: 500; Referees: Bócz, Wiedemann
Round 23; 9 May 2026; 15:45 CEST	Kajdon 10	(9–14)	Toublanc 8 (1)	Városi Sportcsarnok, Vác; Attendance: 500; Referees: Bócz, Wiedemann
Round 23; 9 May 2026; 15:45 CEST	3× (suspension)	Report	6× (suspension) 1× (red card)	Városi Sportcsarnok, Vác; Attendance: 500; Referees: Bócz, Wiedemann

Round 24; 16 May 2026; 15:15 CEST	FTC-Rail Cargo Hungaria	30–29	DVSC Schaeffler	Elek Gyula Aréna, Budapest; Attendance: 1,100; Referees: Gy. Sándor, B. Szabó
Round 24; 16 May 2026; 15:15 CEST	Simon 10 (3)	(14–18)	Toublanc 11 (6)	Elek Gyula Aréna, Budapest; Attendance: 1,100; Referees: Gy. Sándor, B. Szabó
Round 24; 16 May 2026; 15:15 CEST	1× (yellow card) 6× (suspension)	Report	1× (yellow card) 5× (suspension)	Elek Gyula Aréna, Budapest; Attendance: 1,100; Referees: Gy. Sándor, B. Szabó

Round 25; 24 May 2026; 18:00 CEST	DVSC Schaeffler	23–26	Győri Audi ETO KC	Hódos Imre Sports Hall, Debrecen; Attendance: 2,003; Referees: Altmár, M. Horváth
Round 25; 24 May 2026; 18:00 CEST	Toublanc 5	(10–12)	van Wetering 5	Hódos Imre Sports Hall, Debrecen; Attendance: 2,003; Referees: Altmár, M. Horváth
Round 25; 24 May 2026; 18:00 CEST	2× (suspension)	Report	1× (yellow card) 3× (suspension)	Hódos Imre Sports Hall, Debrecen; Attendance: 2,003; Referees: Altmár, M. Horváth

Round 26; 31 May 2026; 18:00 CEST	Kozármisleny KA	22–39	DVSC Schaeffler	Városi Sportcsarnok, Kozármisleny; Attendance: 350; Referees: Bóna, Földesi
Round 26; 31 May 2026; 18:00 CEST	Scheffer 7 (5)	(11–18)	Toublanc 10 (1)	Városi Sportcsarnok, Kozármisleny; Attendance: 350; Referees: Bóna, Földesi
Round 26; 31 May 2026; 18:00 CEST	2× (suspension)	Report	2× (suspension)	Városi Sportcsarnok, Kozármisleny; Attendance: 350; Referees: Bóna, Földesi

Source: MKSZ (Hungarian Handball Federation), DVSC Kézilabda

==== Results overview ====
All results are indicated from the perspective of DVSC Schaeffler.
We indicate in parentheses the number of round.
Win Draw Loss Postponed

Opposition	Home score	Away score	Aggregate score	Double
Alba Fehérvár KC	33–22 (14)	33–23 (1)	66–45	Yes
NEKA (National Academy of Handball)	46–19 (19)	36–17 (6)	82–36	Yes
Moyra-Budaörs Handball	37–27 (18)	26–21 (5)	63–48	Yes
Dunaújvárosi Kohász KA	35–25 (4)	40–17 (17)	75–42	Yes
MOL Esztergom	36–25 (16)	32–29 (3)	68–54	Yes
FTC-Rail Cargo Hungaria	29–35 (11)	29–30 (24)	58–65	No
Győri ETO KC	23–26 (25)	22–39 (12)	45–65	No
Kisvárda Master Good SE	38–20 (9)	31–19 (22)	69–39	Yes
Motherson-Mosonmagyaróvár	36–23 (21)	26–22 (8)	62–45	Yes
Kozármisleny KA	33–15 (13)	39–22 (26)	72–37	Yes
Szombathely	42–22 (7)	28–23 (20)	70–45	Yes
Vasas SC	31–21 (2)	33–22 (15)	64–43	Yes
Praktiker-Vác	35–24 (10)	33–23 (23)	68–47	Yes

=== Hungarian Cup ===
Win Draw Loss Fixtures Postponed

==== Quarter-final ====
11 March 2026; 18:00 CET	DVSC Schaeffler	34–20	Kisvárda Master Good SE (1)	Hódos Imre Sports Hall, Debrecen; Attendance: 500; Referees: Garai, Varasdi
11 March 2026; 18:00 CET	Sercien-Ugolin 7 (4)	(18–9)	Bianka Kovalcsik 5 (3)	Hódos Imre Sports Hall, Debrecen; Attendance: 500; Referees: Garai, Varasdi
11 March 2026; 18:00 CET	5× (suspension) 1× (red card)	Report	2× (suspension)	Hódos Imre Sports Hall, Debrecen; Attendance: 500; Referees: Garai, Varasdi

==== Final Four ====
Semi final

2 May 2026; 18:15 CEST	Motherson-Mosonmagyaróvár	23–28	DVSC Schaeffler	Tatabányai Multifunkcionális Sportcsarnok, Tatabánya; Attendance: 2,727; Referees: Paska, Vastag
2 May 2026; 18:15 CEST	Kukely 5	(13–17)	Toublanc 8 (6)	Tatabányai Multifunkcionális Sportcsarnok, Tatabánya; Attendance: 2,727; Referees: Paska, Vastag
2 May 2026; 18:15 CEST	7× (suspension)	Report	2× (suspension)	Tatabányai Multifunkcionális Sportcsarnok, Tatabánya; Attendance: 2,727; Referees: Paska, Vastag

Final

3 May 2026; 18:30 CEST	Győri Audi ETO	37–26	DVSC Schaeffler	Tatabányai Multifunkcionális Sportcsarnok, Tatabánya; Attendance: 2,424; Referees: Hargitai, Markó
3 May 2026; 18:30 CEST	Housheer 10 (6)	(16–14)	Toublanc 9 (6)	Tatabányai Multifunkcionális Sportcsarnok, Tatabánya; Attendance: 2,424; Referees: Hargitai, Markó
3 May 2026; 18:30 CEST	1× (yellow card) 6× (suspension)	Report	2× (suspension)	Tatabányai Multifunkcionális Sportcsarnok, Tatabánya; Attendance: 2,424; Referees: Hargitai, Markó

=== EHF Champions League ===
The European Handball Federation on 24 June 2025 confirmed the upgrade requests to the EHF Champions League for the 2025/26 season. DVSC Schaeffler return after a one edition absence. The draw will take place on 27 June 2025.

==== Group stage ====
Pos	Team	Pld	W	D	L	GF	GA	GD	Pts	Qualification	GYO	MET	ESB	BIS	DEB	DOR	STO	BUD
1	(Hungary) Győri Audi ETO KC	14	12	0	2	467	363	+104	24 (Note: Győri Audi ETO KC 58–51 Metz Handball)	Quarterfinals	—	31–27	31–30	33–18	30–31	39–28	40–23	34–22
2	(France) Metz Handball	14	12	0	2	453	364	+89	24	Quarterfinals	24–27	—	40–26	29–26	33–26	38–29	29–27	38–18
3	(Denmark) Team Esbjerg	14	9	1	4	462	422	+40	19	Playoffs	33–28	29–30	—	32–28	39–30	36–29	30–24	36–24
4	(Romania) CS Gloria Bistrița	14	8	0	6	420	435	−15	16	Playoffs	22–27	24–31	38–35	—	32–31	36–32	29–26	34–38
5	(Hungary) DVSC Schaeffler	14	6	0	8	408	428	−20	12	Playoffs	30–36	30–35	29–32	33–34	—	29–23	26–24	30–34
6	(Germany) Borussia Dortmund	14	4	0	10	387	449	−62	8	Playoffs	30–43	24–33	24–31	32–36	28–26	—	22–26	30–24
7	(Norway) Storhamar HE	14	3	0	11	371	405	−34	6		25–32	24–27	33–39	32–30	28–30	30–31	—	25–14
8	(Montenegro) OTP Group Budućnost	14	1	1	12	341	443	−102	3		20–36	23–39	34–34	26–29	24–25	22–25	22–26	—

Source: EHF
Rules for classification: Tiebreakers

===== Matches =====
Season report.
Win Draw Loss Fixtures Postponed

7 September 2025; 16:00 CEST	OTP Group Budućnost (Montenegro)	24–25	(Hungary) DVSC Schaeffler	Bemax Arena, Podgorica (Montenegro); Attendance: 1,000; Referees: Ilieva, Karbeska (MKD)
7 September 2025; 16:00 CEST	Grbić 7	(11–10)	Sercien-Ugolin, Tóvizi 5	Bemax Arena, Podgorica (Montenegro); Attendance: 1,000; Referees: Ilieva, Karbeska (MKD)
7 September 2025; 16:00 CEST	2× (suspension)	Report	1× (yellow card) 3× (suspension)	Bemax Arena, Podgorica (Montenegro); Attendance: 1,000; Referees: Ilieva, Karbeska (MKD)

13 September 2025; 16:00 CEST	DVSC Schaeffler (Hungary)	33–34	(Romania) Bistrița	Hódos Imre Sports Hall, Debrecen; Attendance: 1,500; Referees: Budzák, Záhradník (SVK)
13 September 2025; 16:00 CEST	Toublanc 11	(15–15)	Nüsser, Fujita 9	Hódos Imre Sports Hall, Debrecen; Attendance: 1,500; Referees: Budzák, Záhradník (SVK)
13 September 2025; 16:00 CEST	1× (yellow card) 4× (suspension) 1× (red card)	Report	2× (yellow card) 3× (suspension)	Hódos Imre Sports Hall, Debrecen; Attendance: 1,500; Referees: Budzák, Záhradník (SVK)

28 September 2025; 14:00 CEST	Dortmund (Germany)	28–26	(Hungary) DVSC Schaeffler	Helmut-Körnig-Halle, Dortmund (Germany); Attendance: 1000; Referees: Barysas, Petrušis (LTU)
28 September 2025; 14:00 CEST	Grijseels 9	(17–17)	Sercien-Ugolin 6	Helmut-Körnig-Halle, Dortmund (Germany); Attendance: 1000; Referees: Barysas, Petrušis (LTU)
28 September 2025; 14:00 CEST	1× (yellow card) 2× (suspension)	Report	1× (yellow card) 2× (suspension)	Helmut-Körnig-Halle, Dortmund (Germany); Attendance: 1000; Referees: Barysas, Petrušis (LTU)

4 October 2025; 16:00 CEST	DVSC Schaeffler (Hungary)	29–32	(Denmark) Esbjerg	Hódos Imre Sports Hall, Debrecen; Attendance: 2,010; Referees: Weijmans, Wolbertus (NED)
4 October 2025; 16:00 CEST	Jovović 7	(14–15)	Reistad, Schmid 9	Hódos Imre Sports Hall, Debrecen; Attendance: 2,010; Referees: Weijmans, Wolbertus (NED)
4 October 2025; 16:00 CEST	1× (yellow card) 1× (suspension)	Report	2× (suspension)	Hódos Imre Sports Hall, Debrecen; Attendance: 2,010; Referees: Weijmans, Wolbertus (NED)

25 October 2025; 18:00 CEST	DVSC Schaeffler (Hungary)	30–36	(Hungary) Győri Audi ETO	Hódos Imre Sports Hall, Debrecen; Attendance: 2,150; Referees: Fabryczny, Rawicki (POL)
25 October 2025; 18:00 CEST	Toublanc 11	(14–19)	Hagman 6	Hódos Imre Sports Hall, Debrecen; Attendance: 2,150; Referees: Fabryczny, Rawicki (POL)
25 October 2025; 18:00 CEST	2× (suspension)	Report	1× (yellow card) 2× (suspension)	Hódos Imre Sports Hall, Debrecen; Attendance: 2,150; Referees: Fabryczny, Rawicki (POL)

2 November 2025; 16:00 CET	Storhamar (Norway)	28–30	(Hungary) DVSC Schaeffler	OBOS Arena, Hamar (Norway); Attendance: 892; Referees: Vujačić, Kažanegra (MNE)
2 November 2025; 16:00 CET	Obaidli 8	(16–15)	Toublanc 6	OBOS Arena, Hamar (Norway); Attendance: 892; Referees: Vujačić, Kažanegra (MNE)
2 November 2025; 16:00 CET	1× (yellow card) 2× (suspension)	Report	1× (yellow card) 4× (suspension)	OBOS Arena, Hamar (Norway); Attendance: 892; Referees: Vujačić, Kažanegra (MNE)

8 November 2025; 20:00 CET	DVSC Schaeffler (Hungary)	30–35	(France) Metz	Hódos Imre Sports Hall, Debrecen; Attendance: 2,200; Referees: Covalciuc, Covalciuc (MDA)
8 November 2025; 20:00 CET	Jovović 6	(14–21)	Bouktit 8	Hódos Imre Sports Hall, Debrecen; Attendance: 2,200; Referees: Covalciuc, Covalciuc (MDA)
8 November 2025; 20:00 CET	1× (suspension)	Report	2× (suspension)	Hódos Imre Sports Hall, Debrecen; Attendance: 2,200; Referees: Covalciuc, Covalciuc (MDA)

15 November 2025; 18:00 CET	Metz (France)	33–26	(Hungary) DVSC Schaeffler	Les Arènes, Metz (France); Attendance: 4,124; Referees: Sekulić, Jovandić (SRB)
15 November 2025; 18:00 CET	Bouktit 9	(13–12)	Juhász, Szabó 4	Les Arènes, Metz (France); Attendance: 4,124; Referees: Sekulić, Jovandić (SRB)
15 November 2025; 18:00 CET	1× (yellow card) 1× (suspension)	Report	4× (suspension)	Les Arènes, Metz (France); Attendance: 4,124; Referees: Sekulić, Jovandić (SRB)

10 January 2026; 20:00 CET	DVSC Schaeffler (Hungary)	26–24	(Norway) Storhamar	Hódos Imre Sports Hall, Debrecen; Attendance: 1,600; Referees: Bocakova, Janosikova (SVK)
10 January 2026; 20:00 CET	Hámori 6	(10–13)	Rivas-Toft, Kafka Malá 5	Hódos Imre Sports Hall, Debrecen; Attendance: 1,600; Referees: Bocakova, Janosikova (SVK)
10 January 2026; 20:00 CET	4× (suspension)	Report	3× (suspension)	Hódos Imre Sports Hall, Debrecen; Attendance: 1,600; Referees: Bocakova, Janosikova (SVK)

17 January 2026; 18:00 CET	Győri Audi ETO (Hungary)	30–31	(Hungary) DVSC Schaeffler	Audi Arena, Győr (Hungary); Attendance: 3,769; Referees: Duplii, Pobedrina (UKR)
17 January 2026; 18:00 CET	Hovden 7	(16–16)	Toublanc 9	Audi Arena, Győr (Hungary); Attendance: 3,769; Referees: Duplii, Pobedrina (UKR)
17 January 2026; 18:00 CET	6× (suspension)	Report	6× (suspension) 1× (red card)	Audi Arena, Győr (Hungary); Attendance: 3,769; Referees: Duplii, Pobedrina (UKR)

25 January 2026; 14:00 CET	Esbjerg (Denmark)	39–30	(Hungary) DVSC Schaeffler	Blue Water Dokken, Esbjerg (Denmark); Attendance: 2,550; Referees: Kull, Tint (EST)
25 January 2026; 14:00 CET	Reistad 7	(21–12)	Jovović 8	Blue Water Dokken, Esbjerg (Denmark); Attendance: 2,550; Referees: Kull, Tint (EST)
25 January 2026; 14:00 CET		Report	1× (yellow card) 5× (suspension)	Blue Water Dokken, Esbjerg (Denmark); Attendance: 2,550; Referees: Kull, Tint (EST)

7 February 2026; 16:00 CET	DVSC Schaeffler (Hungary)	29–23	(Germany) Dortmund	Hódos Imre Sports Hall, Debrecen; Attendance: 1,967; Referees: Fotakidis, Kinatzidis (GRE)
7 February 2026; 16:00 CET	Toublanc 8	(20–11)	Olsson 6	Hódos Imre Sports Hall, Debrecen; Attendance: 1,967; Referees: Fotakidis, Kinatzidis (GRE)
7 February 2026; 16:00 CET	1× (yellow card) 6× (suspension)	Report	4× (suspension)	Hódos Imre Sports Hall, Debrecen; Attendance: 1,967; Referees: Fotakidis, Kinatzidis (GRE)

15 February 2026; 16:00 CET	Bistrița (Romania)	32–31	(Hungary) DVSC Schaeffler	TeraPlast Arena, Bistrița (Romania); Attendance: 3,007; Referees: Sekulic, Jovandic (SRB)
15 February 2026; 16:00 CET	Delgado 8	(16–17)	three players 6	TeraPlast Arena, Bistrița (Romania); Attendance: 3,007; Referees: Sekulic, Jovandic (SRB)
15 February 2026; 16:00 CET	2× (suspension)	Report	5× (suspension) 1× (red card)	TeraPlast Arena, Bistrița (Romania); Attendance: 3,007; Referees: Sekulic, Jovandic (SRB)

22 February 2026; 14:00 CET	DVSC Schaeffler (Hungary)	32–30	(Montenegro) Budućnost	Hódos Imre Sports Hall, Debrecen; Attendance: 1,800; Referees: Pagh, Thygesen (DEN)
22 February 2026; 14:00 CET	Toublanc 5 (3)	(16–16)	Grbić 9 (5)	Hódos Imre Sports Hall, Debrecen; Attendance: 1,800; Referees: Pagh, Thygesen (DEN)
22 February 2026; 14:00 CET	5× (suspension)	Report	4× (suspension)	Hódos Imre Sports Hall, Debrecen; Attendance: 1,800; Referees: Pagh, Thygesen (DEN)

Source: EHF

==== Playoff ====
Team 1	Agg.	Team 2	1st leg	2nd leg
DVSC Schaeffler (Hungary)	66–71	Odense Håndbold	32–37	34–34

21 March 2026; 18:00	DVSC Schaeffler (Hungary)	32–37	(Denmark) Odense Håndbold	Hódos Imre Sports Hall, Debrecen; Attendance: 1,800; Referees: Picard, Vauchez (FRA)
21 March 2026; 18:00	Ivančok-Šoltić 5	(13–18)	Fauske 8 (5)	Hódos Imre Sports Hall, Debrecen; Attendance: 1,800; Referees: Picard, Vauchez (FRA)
21 March 2026; 18:00	1× (yellow card) 4× (suspension)	Report	1× (yellow card) 3× (suspension)	Hódos Imre Sports Hall, Debrecen; Attendance: 1,800; Referees: Picard, Vauchez (FRA)

29 March 2026; 16:00	Odense Håndbold (Denmark)	34–34	(Hungary) DVSC Schaeffler	Sydbank Arena, Odense; Attendance: 2,177; Referees: Weijmans, Wolbertus (NED)
29 March 2026; 16:00	Rushfeldt Deila 9	(13–16)	Tóvizi 6	Sydbank Arena, Odense; Attendance: 2,177; Referees: Weijmans, Wolbertus (NED)
29 March 2026; 16:00	1× (suspension)	Report	3× (suspension)	Sydbank Arena, Odense; Attendance: 2,177; Referees: Weijmans, Wolbertus (NED)

== Statistics ==
=== Attendances from season to season ===
Includes all competitive matches.
Last updated on 24 May 2026.

Season	Hungarian League				Hungarian Cup				European League				Total			
Season	Total	M.	Avg.	%	Total	M.	Avg.	%	Total	M.	Avg.	%	Total	M.	Avg.	%
2025–26	13,349	13	1,027	-10%	500	1	500	—	15,027 (Note: EHF Champions League)	8	1,878	-6%	28,876	22	1,313	+9%
2024–25	14,800	13	1,138	+11%	0	0	0	—	2,000 (Note: EHF European League)	1	2,000	+6%	16,800	14	1,200	-11%
2023–24	13,270	13	1,021	-17%	0	0	0	—	15,000	8	1,875	-3%	28,270	21	1,346	+2%
2022–23	16,000	13	1,231	+11%	2,000	2	1,000	-44%	5,800	3	1,933	+7%	23,800	18	1,322	+10%
2021–22	14,400	13	1,108	—	1,800	1	1,800	—	1,800	1	1,800	—	18,000	15	1,200	—
