= 2022–23 Debreceni VSC (women's handball) season =

DVSC Schaeffler sports season

DVSC Schaeffler
2022–23 season
- President: Zsolt Ábrók
- Manager: (Hungary) Zoltán Szilágyi
- Stadium: Hódos Imre Sports Hall
- NB I: Third place
- Hungarian Cup: Third place
- EHF European League: Group stage – Third place
- Top goalscorer: League: (Hungary) Töpfner (130 goals); All: (Hungary) Töpfner (164 goals)
- Highest home attendance: 2,100 Sola EL Group (February 4, 2023)
- Lowest home attendance: 800 three matches
Home colours	Away colours

The 2022–23 season is Debreceni VSC's 43rd competitive and consecutive season in the Nemzeti Bajnokság I and 74th year in existence as a handball club.

Since August 2018 they are sponsored by Schaeffler Group, so the official name for the team is DVSC Schaeffler.

== Players ==
=== Squad information ===
Goalkeepers (GK)

- 12 (Hungary) Vanessa Torda
- 16 (Germany) Ann-Cathrin Giegerich
- 94 (France) Catherine Gabriel

Left wingers (LW)

- 24 (Hungary) Míra Vámos
- 71 (Hungary) Mirtill Petrus

Right wingers (RW)

- 28 (Hungary) Alexandra Töpfner
- 88 (Brazil) Mariana Costa

Line players (LP)

- 13 (Hungary) Petra Füzi-Tóvizi
- 18 (Hungary) Réka Bordás

Left backs (LB)

- 22 (Serbia) Jovana Jovović
- 44 (Hungary) Gréta Kácsor
- 77 (Hungary) Anna Krisztina Panyi
- 92 (Hungary) Dóra Hornyák

Centre backs (CB)

- 25 (Hungary) Liliána Csernyánszki
- 38 (Hungary) Petra Vámos (c)
- 81 (Hungary) Nina Szabó

Right backs (RB)

- 5 (Hungary) Konszuéla Hámori
- 43 (Hungary) Szimonetta Planéta

== Club ==
=== Technical Staff ===
Position	Staff member
President	(Hungary) Zsolt Ábrók
Technical manager	(Hungary) Marietta Vágó
Head coach	(Hungary) Zoltán Szilágyi
Assistant coach	(Hungary) Kitti Kudor
Goalkeeping coach	(Slovenia) Grega Karpan
Team doctor	(Hungary) Dr. Tamás Bazsó
Physiotherapist	(Hungary) Attila Kazsimér
Physiotherapist	(Hungary) Laura Kerék
Fitness coach	(Hungary) Emese Suba
Video Analytics	(Hungary) Attila Kun

Source: Coaches, Management

=== Uniform ===
- Supplier: (Germany) Adidas
- Main sponsor: Shaeffler / tippmix / Tranzit-Food / City of Debrecen / Manz
- Back sponsor: Volkswagen / Globus / Cívis Ház
- Arm sponsor: BCB Higiénia / EHF
- Shorts sponsor: Miko Coffee / CTS Informatika / MySeyu / Team&Event / tippmix

== Pre-season ==
=== Friendly matches ===
22 July 2022; 16:00	DVSC Schaeffler	39–26	(Romania) CS Minaur Baia Mare	Hódos Imre Sports Hall, Debrecen
22 July 2022; 16:00	Töpfner 11	(20–11)		Hódos Imre Sports Hall, Debrecen
22 July 2022; 16:00		Report		Hódos Imre Sports Hall, Debrecen

26 July 2022; 16:30	Mosonmagyaróvári KC SE	30–25	DVSC Schaeffler	NEKA-csarnok, Balatonboglár; Attendance: 0 Referees: T. Fekete T., D. Tóth (HUN)
26 July 2022; 16:30	Ivancok, P. Kovács, F. Bardi 4	(16–12)	Petrus 7	NEKA-csarnok, Balatonboglár; Attendance: 0 Referees: T. Fekete T., D. Tóth (HUN)
26 July 2022; 16:30		Report		NEKA-csarnok, Balatonboglár; Attendance: 0 Referees: T. Fekete T., D. Tóth (HUN)

9 August 2022; 16:00	Békéscsabai Előre NKSE	25–45	DVSC Schaeffler	Városi Sportcsarnok Békéscsaba, Békéscsaba; Attendance: 0 Referees: Paksa, Vastag (HUN)
9 August 2022; 16:00	Gyimesi 7	(15–23)	N. Szabó 8	Városi Sportcsarnok Békéscsaba, Békéscsaba; Attendance: 0 Referees: Paksa, Vastag (HUN)
9 August 2022; 16:00		Report		Városi Sportcsarnok Békéscsaba, Békéscsaba; Attendance: 0 Referees: Paksa, Vastag (HUN)

12 August 2022; 16:00	DVSC Schaeffler	39–19	(Romania) CS Minaur Baia Mare	Hódos Imre Sports Hall, Debrecen; Attendance: 250; Referees: L. Sándor, Cs. Szikszay (HUN)
12 August 2022; 16:00	Töpfner, M. Vámos 7	(23–11)		Hódos Imre Sports Hall, Debrecen; Attendance: 250; Referees: L. Sándor, Cs. Szikszay (HUN)
12 August 2022; 16:00	4× (suspension)	Report	4× (suspension)	Hódos Imre Sports Hall, Debrecen; Attendance: 250; Referees: L. Sándor, Cs. Szikszay (HUN)

18 August 2022; 15:45	(Romania) HC Zalău	21–36	DVSC Schaeffler	Városi Sportcsarnok Kisvárda, Kisvárda; Referees: Ignéczi, Pánczél-Héjjas (HUN)
18 August 2022; 15:45		(11–20)	Töpfner 8	Városi Sportcsarnok Kisvárda, Kisvárda; Referees: Ignéczi, Pánczél-Héjjas (HUN)
18 August 2022; 15:45		Report		Városi Sportcsarnok Kisvárda, Kisvárda; Referees: Ignéczi, Pánczél-Héjjas (HUN)

19 August 2022; 14:00	(Slovakia) IUVENTA Michalovce	22–24	DVSC Schaeffler	Városi Sportcsarnok Kisvárda, Kisvárda; Attendance: 50; Referees: Rontó, Szanyi (HUN)
19 August 2022; 14:00		(10–12)	Töpfner 7	Városi Sportcsarnok Kisvárda, Kisvárda; Attendance: 50; Referees: Rontó, Szanyi (HUN)
19 August 2022; 14:00		Report		Városi Sportcsarnok Kisvárda, Kisvárda; Attendance: 50; Referees: Rontó, Szanyi (HUN)

26 August 2022; 15:00	FTC-Rail Cargo Hungaria	24–23	DVSC Schaeffler	Elek Gyula Aréna, Budapest
26 August 2022; 15:00		(13–8)	Töpfner 6	Elek Gyula Aréna, Budapest
26 August 2022; 15:00		Report		Elek Gyula Aréna, Budapest

== Competitions ==
=== Overview ===
Competition	First match	Last match	Starting round	Record							
Competition	First match	Last match	Starting round	Pld	W	D	L	GF	GA	GD	Win %
Nemzeti Bajnokság I	2 September 2022	27 May 2023	Matchday 1	26	18	3	5	778	633	+145	69.23
Magyar Kupa	25 February 2023	23 April 2023	Fourth round	4	3	0	1	122	101	+21	75.00
EHF European League	7 January 2023	19 February 2023	Group stage	6	4	0	2	158	163	−5	66.67
Total				36	25	3	8	1,058	897	+161	69.44

Source: Competitions

=== Nemzeti Bajnokság I ===
==== League table ====
Pos	Team	Pld	W	D	L	GF	GA	GD	Pts	Qualification or relegation
1	Győri Audi ETO KC	26	25	0	1	854	590	+264	50	Qualification to Champions League group stage
2	FTC-Rail Cargo Hungaria	26	23	2	1	853	614	+239	48	Qualification to Champions League group stage
3	DVSC SCHAEFFLER	26	18	3	5	778	633	+145	39	Qualification to Champions League group stage
4	Motherson-Mosonmagyaróvár	26	17	2	7	799	698	+101	36	Qualification to European League group phase
5	Siófok KC	26	13	4	9	731	697	+34	30 (Note: Liquidation proceedings were launched against the club due to unpaid employee wages, as a result of which they were relegated to the third division.)	Relegation to Nemzeti Bajnokság I/B

Source: mksz.hu
Rules for classification: 1) Points; 2) Goal difference; 3) Head-to-head points; 4) Head-to-head goal difference; 5) Goals scored; 6) Matches won; 7) Draw (Note: Head-to-head record is used only after all the matches between the teams in question have been played)

==== Results by round ====
Match	1	2	3	4	5	6	7	8	9	10	11	12	13	14	15	16	17	18	19	20	21	22	23	24	25	26
Ground	H	H	H	A	H	A	H	A	H	A	H	H	H	A	A	A	H	A	H	A	H	A	H	A	A	A
Result	W	W	W	L	W	L	W	W	L	D	W	W	W	W	W	D	W	W	D	W	W	L	L	W	W	W

Source: Matches
A = Away; H = Home; W = Win; D = Draw; L = Loss

==== Matches ====
Round 1; 2 September 2022; 18:00	DVSC Schaeffler	33–23	Alba Fehérvár KC	Hódos Imre Sports Hall, Debrecen; Attendance: 1,100; Referees: Gábor Kiu, Tamás Kiu (HUN)
Round 1; 2 September 2022; 18:00	Töpfner 6	(19–11)	Stošić 6	Hódos Imre Sports Hall, Debrecen; Attendance: 1,100; Referees: Gábor Kiu, Tamás Kiu (HUN)
Round 1; 2 September 2022; 18:00	1× (yellow card) 5× (suspension)	Report	1× (yellow card) 4× (suspension)	Hódos Imre Sports Hall, Debrecen; Attendance: 1,100; Referees: Gábor Kiu, Tamás Kiu (HUN)

Round 2; 9 September 2022; 18:00	DVSC Schaeffler	31–24	MTK Budapest	Hódos Imre Sports Hall, Debrecen; Attendance: 1,000; Referees: Erika Őri, Erika Ónodi (HUN)
Round 2; 9 September 2022; 18:00	Kácsor 9	(15–10)	Kekézovity 7	Hódos Imre Sports Hall, Debrecen; Attendance: 1,000; Referees: Erika Őri, Erika Ónodi (HUN)
Round 2; 9 September 2022; 18:00	3× (suspension)	Report	4× (suspension)	Hódos Imre Sports Hall, Debrecen; Attendance: 1,000; Referees: Erika Őri, Erika Ónodi (HUN)

Round 13; 16 September 2022; 17:00	DVSC Schaeffler	40–27	Dunaújvárosi Kohász KA	Hódos Imre Sports Hall, Debrecen; Attendance: 900; Referees: Máté Bujdosó, Viktor Horváth (HUN)
Round 13; 16 September 2022; 17:00	Töpfner 8	(22–14)	Farkas 8	Hódos Imre Sports Hall, Debrecen; Attendance: 900; Referees: Máté Bujdosó, Viktor Horváth (HUN)
Round 13; 16 September 2022; 17:00	1× (suspension)	Report	2× (yellow card) 4× (suspension)	Hódos Imre Sports Hall, Debrecen; Attendance: 900; Referees: Máté Bujdosó, Viktor Horváth (HUN)

Round 3; 23 September 2022; 18:00	DVSC Schaeffler	30–24	Mosonmagyaróvári KC SE	Hódos Imre Sports Hall, Debrecen; Attendance: 1,400; Referees: Szabolcs Bóna, Csaba Földesi (HUN)
Round 3; 23 September 2022; 18:00	Planéta 7	(13–12)	Pásztor 6	Hódos Imre Sports Hall, Debrecen; Attendance: 1,400; Referees: Szabolcs Bóna, Csaba Földesi (HUN)
Round 3; 23 September 2022; 18:00	4× (suspension)	Report	6× (suspension)	Hódos Imre Sports Hall, Debrecen; Attendance: 1,400; Referees: Szabolcs Bóna, Csaba Földesi (HUN)

Round 22; 5 October 2022; 19:00	Győri Audi ETO KC	25–22	DVSC Schaeffler	Audi Aréna, Győr; Attendance: 1,894; Referees: Ferenc Nagy, József Túróczy (HUN)
Round 22; 5 October 2022; 19:00	three players 5	(11–11)	Töpfner 7	Audi Aréna, Győr; Attendance: 1,894; Referees: Ferenc Nagy, József Túróczy (HUN)
Round 22; 5 October 2022; 19:00	1× (yellow card) 2× (suspension)	Report	1× (yellow card) 4× (suspension)	Audi Aréna, Győr; Attendance: 1,894; Referees: Ferenc Nagy, József Túróczy (HUN)

Round 4; 15 October 2022; 18:00	Moyra-Budaörs Handball	13–38	DVSC Schaeffler	Városi Sportcsarnok Budaörs, Budaörs; Attendance: 763; Referees: Ferenc Felhő, Tamás Öcsi (HUN)
Round 4; 15 October 2022; 18:00	Pálos-Bognár 6	(9–11)	Vámos, Töpfner 7	Városi Sportcsarnok Budaörs, Budaörs; Attendance: 763; Referees: Ferenc Felhő, Tamás Öcsi (HUN)
Round 4; 15 October 2022; 18:00	2× (yellow card) 3× (suspension)	Report	2× (yellow card) 4× (suspension)	Városi Sportcsarnok Budaörs, Budaörs; Attendance: 763; Referees: Ferenc Felhő, Tamás Öcsi (HUN)

Round 5; 21 October 2022; 18:00	DVSC Schaeffler	32–24	Érd HC	Hódos Imre Sports Hall, Debrecen; Attendance: 1,500; Referees: Stefánia Kovács-Sebők, Rebeka Vastag-Réti (HUN)
Round 5; 21 October 2022; 18:00	Töpfner 9	(16–11)	Csáki 7	Hódos Imre Sports Hall, Debrecen; Attendance: 1,500; Referees: Stefánia Kovács-Sebők, Rebeka Vastag-Réti (HUN)
Round 5; 21 October 2022; 18:00	2× (yellow card) 1× (suspension)	Report	2× (yellow card) 5× (suspension)	Hódos Imre Sports Hall, Debrecen; Attendance: 1,500; Referees: Stefánia Kovács-Sebők, Rebeka Vastag-Réti (HUN)

Round 15; 3 December 2022; 17:00	MTK Budapest	28–29	DVSC Schaeffler	Riz Levente Sport és Rendvezvény Központ, Budapest; Attendance: 200; Referees: Kristóf Altmár, Márton Horváth (HUN)
Round 15; 3 December 2022; 17:00	Pál 6	(11–14)	Vámos, Töpfner 7	Riz Levente Sport és Rendvezvény Központ, Budapest; Attendance: 200; Referees: Kristóf Altmár, Márton Horváth (HUN)
Round 15; 3 December 2022; 17:00	4× (suspension)	Report	3× (suspension)	Riz Levente Sport és Rendvezvény Központ, Budapest; Attendance: 200; Referees: Kristóf Altmár, Márton Horváth (HUN)

Round 6; 14 December 2022; 18:00	Siófok KC	28–26	DVSC Schaeffler	Kiss Szilárd Aréna, Siófok; Attendance: 500; Referees: Ferenc Felhő, Tamás Öcsi (HUN)
Round 6; 14 December 2022; 18:00	Mavsar, Debreczeni-Klivinyi 6	(10–18)	Jovović 5	Kiss Szilárd Aréna, Siófok; Attendance: 500; Referees: Ferenc Felhő, Tamás Öcsi (HUN)
Round 6; 14 December 2022; 18:00	2× (yellow card) 2× (suspension) 1× (red card)	Report	1× (yellow card) 7× (suspension)	Kiss Szilárd Aréna, Siófok; Attendance: 500; Referees: Ferenc Felhő, Tamás Öcsi (HUN)

Round 7; 17 December 2022; 17:15	DVSC Schaeffler	34–33	Váci NKSE	Hódos Imre Sports Hall, Debrecen; Attendance: 1,200; Referees: Szabolcs Bóna, Csaba Földesi (HUN)
Round 7; 17 December 2022; 17:15	Planéta 7	(20–14)	Kuczora 12	Hódos Imre Sports Hall, Debrecen; Attendance: 1,200; Referees: Szabolcs Bóna, Csaba Földesi (HUN)
Round 7; 17 December 2022; 17:15	4× (suspension)	Report	1× (yellow card) 5× (suspension)	Hódos Imre Sports Hall, Debrecen; Attendance: 1,200; Referees: Szabolcs Bóna, Csaba Földesi (HUN)

Round 8; 22 December 2022; 18:00	Nemzeti Kézilabda Akadémia	23–27	DVSC Schaeffler	NEKA Csarnok, Balatonboglár; Attendance: 300; Referees: Ádám Héjja, Balázs Kónya (HUN)
Round 8; 22 December 2022; 18:00	Uhrin 6	(13–13)	Kácsor 6	NEKA Csarnok, Balatonboglár; Attendance: 300; Referees: Ádám Héjja, Balázs Kónya (HUN)
Round 8; 22 December 2022; 18:00	6× (suspension)	Report	4× (suspension)	NEKA Csarnok, Balatonboglár; Attendance: 300; Referees: Ádám Héjja, Balázs Kónya (HUN)

Round 9; 30 December 2022; 19:00	DVSC Schaeffler	30–31	Győri Audi ETO KC	Hódos Imre Sports Hall, Debrecen; Attendance: 2,000; Referees: Gábor Hargitai, Gábor Markó (HUN)
Round 9; 30 December 2022; 19:00	Kácsor 10	(15–16)	Ryu 7	Hódos Imre Sports Hall, Debrecen; Attendance: 2,000; Referees: Gábor Hargitai, Gábor Markó (HUN)
Round 9; 30 December 2022; 19:00	4× (suspension)	Report	3× (yellow card) 5× (suspension)	Hódos Imre Sports Hall, Debrecen; Attendance: 2,000; Referees: Gábor Hargitai, Gábor Markó (HUN)

Round 10; 11 January 2023; 18:45	FTC-Rail Cargo Hungaria	30–30	DVSC Schaeffler	Elek Gyula Aréna, Budapest; Attendance: 1,150; Referees: Miklós Amdorka, Róbert Hucker (HUN)
Round 10; 11 January 2023; 18:45	three players 5	(16–12)	Vámos 7	Elek Gyula Aréna, Budapest; Attendance: 1,150; Referees: Miklós Amdorka, Róbert Hucker (HUN)
Round 10; 11 January 2023; 18:45	2× (yellow card) 5× (suspension)	Report	1× (suspension)	Elek Gyula Aréna, Budapest; Attendance: 1,150; Referees: Miklós Amdorka, Róbert Hucker (HUN)

Round 12; 26 January 2023; 18:00	DVSC Schaeffler	30–22	Békéscsabai Előre NKSE	Hódos Imre Sports Hall, Debrecen; Attendance: 1,500; Referees: Tamás Haskó, Norbert Natkai (HUN)
Round 12; 26 January 2023; 18:00	Kácsor 8	(14–10)	Lanistanin 10	Hódos Imre Sports Hall, Debrecen; Attendance: 1,500; Referees: Tamás Haskó, Norbert Natkai (HUN)
Round 12; 26 January 2023; 18:00	1× (suspension)	Report	2× (yellow card) 4× (suspension)	Hódos Imre Sports Hall, Debrecen; Attendance: 1,500; Referees: Tamás Haskó, Norbert Natkai (HUN)

Round 11; 29 January 2023; 18:00	DVSC Schaeffler	22–19	Kisvárdai KC	Hódos Imre Sports Hall, Debrecen; Attendance: 1,000; Referees: Gábor Kiu, Tamás Kiu (HUN)
Round 11; 29 January 2023; 18:00	Kácsor 7	(10–10)	Siska 5	Hódos Imre Sports Hall, Debrecen; Attendance: 1,000; Referees: Gábor Kiu, Tamás Kiu (HUN)
Round 11; 29 January 2023; 18:00	2× (suspension)	Report	2× (yellow card) 3× (suspension)	Hódos Imre Sports Hall, Debrecen; Attendance: 1,000; Referees: Gábor Kiu, Tamás Kiu (HUN)

Round 16; 26 February 2023; 18:45	Mosonmagyaróvári KC SE	28–28	DVSC Schaeffler	UFM Aréna, Mosonmagyaróvár; Attendance: 900; Referees: Kristóf Altmár, Márton Horváth (HUN)
Round 16; 26 February 2023; 18:45	Lancz 7	(16–15)	Planéta 8	UFM Aréna, Mosonmagyaróvár; Attendance: 900; Referees: Kristóf Altmár, Márton Horváth (HUN)
Round 16; 26 February 2023; 18:45	3× (suspension)	Report	2× (yellow card) 6× (suspension)	UFM Aréna, Mosonmagyaróvár; Attendance: 900; Referees: Kristóf Altmár, Márton Horváth (HUN)

Round 17; 10 March 2023; 18:00	DVSC Schaeffler	34–23	Moyra-Budaörs Handball	Hódos Imre Sports Hall, Debrecen; Attendance: 800; Referees: Ádám Héjja, Balázs Kónya (HUN)
Round 17; 10 March 2023; 18:00	Costa 8	(19–10)	Pálos-Bognár 6	Hódos Imre Sports Hall, Debrecen; Attendance: 800; Referees: Ádám Héjja, Balázs Kónya (HUN)
Round 17; 10 March 2023; 18:00	1× (yellow card) 6× (suspension)	Report		Hódos Imre Sports Hall, Debrecen; Attendance: 800; Referees: Ádám Héjja, Balázs Kónya (HUN)

Round 18; 18 March 2023; 18:00	Érd HC	21–32	DVSC Schaeffler	Érd Aréna, Érd; Attendance: 500; Referees: Bence Asztalos, Zoltán Szalay (HUN)
Round 18; 18 March 2023; 18:00	Kopecz 9	(14–17)	three players 5	Érd Aréna, Érd; Attendance: 500; Referees: Bence Asztalos, Zoltán Szalay (HUN)
Round 18; 18 March 2023; 18:00	1× (yellow card) 4× (suspension)	Report	2× (yellow card) 3× (suspension)	Érd Aréna, Érd; Attendance: 500; Referees: Bence Asztalos, Zoltán Szalay (HUN)

Round 20; 1 April 2023; 16:00	Váci NKSE	20–22	DVSC Schaeffler	Városi Sportcsarnok Vác, Vác; Attendance: 550; Referees: Gábor Hargitai, Gábor Markó (HUN)
Round 20; 1 April 2023; 16:00	Kuczora 8	(10–12)	Hámori 5	Városi Sportcsarnok Vác, Vác; Attendance: 550; Referees: Gábor Hargitai, Gábor Markó (HUN)
Round 20; 1 April 2023; 16:00	2× (yellow card) 4× (suspension)	Report	2× (yellow card) 3× (suspension)	Városi Sportcsarnok Vác, Vác; Attendance: 550; Referees: Gábor Hargitai, Gábor Markó (HUN)

Round 21; 16 April 2023; 18:00	DVSC Schaeffler	29–25	Nemzeti Kézilabda Akadémia	Hódos Imre Sports Hall, Debrecen; Attendance: 800; Referees: Erika Ónodi, Erika Őri (HUN)
Round 21; 16 April 2023; 18:00	three players 5	(15–11)	Csíkos 9	Hódos Imre Sports Hall, Debrecen; Attendance: 800; Referees: Erika Ónodi, Erika Őri (HUN)
Round 21; 16 April 2023; 18:00	1× (yellow card) 3× (suspension)	Report	1× (yellow card) 6× (suspension)	Hódos Imre Sports Hall, Debrecen; Attendance: 800; Referees: Erika Ónodi, Erika Őri (HUN)

Round 19; 27 April 2023; 18:00	DVSC Schaeffler	21–21	Siófok KC	Hódos Imre Sports Hall, Debrecen; Attendance: 1,000; Referees: Szabolcs Bóna, Csaba Földesi (HUN)
Round 19; 27 April 2023; 18:00	Planéta, Kácsor 4	(13–14)	Milosavljević 6	Hódos Imre Sports Hall, Debrecen; Attendance: 1,000; Referees: Szabolcs Bóna, Csaba Földesi (HUN)
Round 19; 27 April 2023; 18:00	2× (suspension)	Report	1× (suspension)	Hódos Imre Sports Hall, Debrecen; Attendance: 1,000; Referees: Szabolcs Bóna, Csaba Földesi (HUN)

Round 23; 2 May 2023; 18:00	DVSC Schaeffler	26–29	FTC-Rail Cargo Hungaria	Hódos Imre Sports Hall, Debrecen; Attendance: 1,800; Referees: Ferenc Nagy, József Túróczy (HUN)
Round 23; 2 May 2023; 18:00	Planéta, Petrus 5	(16–14)	Klujber 11	Hódos Imre Sports Hall, Debrecen; Attendance: 1,800; Referees: Ferenc Nagy, József Túróczy (HUN)
Round 23; 2 May 2023; 18:00	1× (yellow card) 2× (suspension)	Report	2× (yellow card) 3× (suspension)	Hódos Imre Sports Hall, Debrecen; Attendance: 1,800; Referees: Ferenc Nagy, József Túróczy (HUN)

Round 14; 10 May 2023; 18:00	Alba Fehérvár KC	26–37	DVSC Schaeffler	Köfém Sportcsarnok, Székesfehérvár; Attendance: 300; Referees: Tamás Fekete, Dávid Tóth (HUN)
Round 14; 10 May 2023; 18:00	Stošić, Zrnić 5	(14–21)	Töpfner 8	Köfém Sportcsarnok, Székesfehérvár; Attendance: 300; Referees: Tamás Fekete, Dávid Tóth (HUN)
Round 14; 10 May 2023; 18:00	1× (yellow card) 2× (suspension)	Report	2× (yellow card) 4× (suspension)	Köfém Sportcsarnok, Székesfehérvár; Attendance: 300; Referees: Tamás Fekete, Dávid Tóth (HUN)

Round 24; 13 May 2023; 18:00	Kisvárdai KC	9–35	DVSC Schaeffler	Városi Sportcsarnok Kisvárda, Kisvárda; Attendance: 320; Referees: Kristóf Altmár, Márton Horváth (HUN)
Round 24; 13 May 2023; 18:00	Juhász 5	(6–20)	Töpfner 7	Városi Sportcsarnok Kisvárda, Kisvárda; Attendance: 320; Referees: Kristóf Altmár, Márton Horváth (HUN)
Round 24; 13 May 2023; 18:00	1× (yellow card) 2× (suspension)	Report	1× (yellow card) 2× (suspension)	Városi Sportcsarnok Kisvárda, Kisvárda; Attendance: 320; Referees: Kristóf Altmár, Márton Horváth (HUN)

Round 25; 20 May 2023; 18:00	Békéscsabai Előre NKSE	20–36	DVSC Schaeffler	Városi Sportcsarnok, Békéscsaba; Attendance: 650; Referees: Máté Bujdosó, Viktor Horváth (HUN)
Round 25; 20 May 2023; 18:00	Termány 4	(8–17)	Töpfner 11	Városi Sportcsarnok, Békéscsaba; Attendance: 650; Referees: Máté Bujdosó, Viktor Horváth (HUN)
Round 25; 20 May 2023; 18:00	4× (suspension)	Report	1× (suspension)	Városi Sportcsarnok, Békéscsaba; Attendance: 650; Referees: Máté Bujdosó, Viktor Horváth (HUN)

Round 26; 27 May 2023; 17:00	Dunaújvárosi Kohász KA	25–39	DVSC Schaeffler	Városi Sportcsarnok, Dunaújváros; Attendance: 300; Referees: Ferenc Felhő, Tamás Öcsi (HUN)
Round 26; 27 May 2023; 17:00	Borgyos 5	(14–22)	Töpfner 13	Városi Sportcsarnok, Dunaújváros; Attendance: 300; Referees: Ferenc Felhő, Tamás Öcsi (HUN)
Round 26; 27 May 2023; 17:00	2× (yellow card) 4× (suspension)	Report	2× (suspension)	Városi Sportcsarnok, Dunaújváros; Attendance: 300; Referees: Ferenc Felhő, Tamás Öcsi (HUN)

==== Results overview ====
All results are indicated from the perspective of DVSC Schaeffler.
We indicate in parentheses the number of round.
Win Draw Loss Postponed

Opposition	Home score	Away score	Aggregate score	Double
Alba Fehérvár KC	33–23	37–26	70–49	Yes
Békéscsabai Előre NKSE	30–22	36–20	66–42	Yes
Moyra-Budaörs Handball	34–22	23–25	57–47	No
Győri ETO KC	30–31	22–25	52–56	No
Dunaújvárosi Kohász KA	40–27	39-25	79–52	Yes
Érd	32–24	32-21	64–45	No
FTC-Rail Cargo Hungaria	26–29	30–30	56–59	No
Kisvárda Master Good SE	22–19	35–9	57–28	Yes
MTK Budapest	31–24	29–28	60–52	Yes
Motherson-Mosonmagyaróvár	30–24	28–28	58–52	No
Nemzeti Kézilabda Akadémia	29–25	27–23	56–48	Yes
Siófok KC	21–21	26–28	47–49	No
Váci NKSE	34–33	22–20	56–53	Yes

=== Hungarian Cup ===
==== Round 4 ====
Round 4; 15 February 2023; 17:00	DVSC Schaeffler	38–23	Dunaújvárosi Kohász KA	Hódos Imre Sports Hall, Debrecen; Attendance: 800; Referees: Stefánia Kovács-Sebők, Réka Vastag-Réti (HUN)
Round 4; 15 February 2023; 17:00	Planéta 7	(20–13)	Szalai, Arany 4	Hódos Imre Sports Hall, Debrecen; Attendance: 800; Referees: Stefánia Kovács-Sebők, Réka Vastag-Réti (HUN)
Round 4; 15 February 2023; 17:00	1× (yellow card) 1× (suspension)	Report	4× (suspension)	Hódos Imre Sports Hall, Debrecen; Attendance: 800; Referees: Stefánia Kovács-Sebők, Réka Vastag-Réti (HUN)

==== Quarterfinal ====
Round QF; 29 March 2023; 18:00	DVSC Schaeffler	28–25	Siófok KC	Hódos Imre Sports Hall, Debrecen; Attendance: 1,200; Referees: László Bócz, Viktor Wiedemann (HUN)
Round QF; 29 March 2023; 18:00	Petrus 9	(12–9)	Mavsar 7	Hódos Imre Sports Hall, Debrecen; Attendance: 1,200; Referees: László Bócz, Viktor Wiedemann (HUN)
Round QF; 29 March 2023; 18:00	3× (suspension)	Report	1× (suspension)	Hódos Imre Sports Hall, Debrecen; Attendance: 1,200; Referees: László Bócz, Viktor Wiedemann (HUN)

==== Semifinal ====
Semi-final; 22 April 2023; 15:00	Győri Audi ETO KC	27–26	DVSC Schaeffler	Tatabányai Multifunkcionális Sportcsarnok, Tatabánya; Attendance: 2,500; Referees: Miklós Andorka, Róbert Hucker (HUN)
Semi-final; 22 April 2023; 15:00	Blohm 8	(16–14)	Planéta 6	Tatabányai Multifunkcionális Sportcsarnok, Tatabánya; Attendance: 2,500; Referees: Miklós Andorka, Róbert Hucker (HUN)
Semi-final; 22 April 2023; 15:00	1× (yellow card) 2× (suspension)	Report	5× (suspension)	Tatabányai Multifunkcionális Sportcsarnok, Tatabánya; Attendance: 2,500; Referees: Miklós Andorka, Róbert Hucker (HUN)

==== Bronze match ====
Bronze match 23 April 2023; 13:45	DVSC Schaeffler	32–26	MTK Budapest	Tatabányai Multifunkcionális Sportcsarnok, Tatabánya; Attendance: 1,500; Referees: Gábor Kiu, Tamás Kiu (HUN)
Bronze match 23 April 2023; 13:45	Petrus 9	(13–8)	Mavsar 7	Tatabányai Multifunkcionális Sportcsarnok, Tatabánya; Attendance: 1,500; Referees: Gábor Kiu, Tamás Kiu (HUN)
Bronze match 23 April 2023; 13:45	3× (suspension)	Report	1× (yellow card) 2× (suspension)	Tatabányai Multifunkcionális Sportcsarnok, Tatabánya; Attendance: 1,500; Referees: Gábor Kiu, Tamás Kiu (HUN)

=== EHF European League ===
==== Group stage ====
Pos	Team	Pld	W	D	L	GF	GA	GD	Pts	Qualification	NYK	SOL	DEB	POD
1	(Denmark) Nykøbing Falster Håndbold	6	4	0	2	172	151	+21	8 (Note: Nykøbing 4 Pts, +11 GD; Sola 4 Pts, +1 GD; DVSC 4 Pts, −12 GD)	Quarterfinals	—	26–28	34–22	28–23
2	(Norway) Sola HK	6	4	0	2	171	156	+15	8	Quarterfinals	26–28	—	30−25	35–29
3	(Hungary) DVSC Schaeffler	6	4	0	2	158	163	−5	8		28−27	25−21	—	32–31
4	(Croatia) Podravka Vegeta	6	0	0	6	150	181	−31	0		24–29	23–31	20–26	—

Source: EHF

===== Matches =====
7 January 2023; 20:00	DVSC Schaeffler	28–27	Nykøbing Falster (Denmark)	Hódos Imre Sports Hall, Debrecen; Attendance: 1,800; Referees: Malgorzata Lidacka, Urszula Lesiak (POL)
7 January 2023; 20:00	Planéta, Kácsor 7	(10–11)	Svele 6	Hódos Imre Sports Hall, Debrecen; Attendance: 1,800; Referees: Malgorzata Lidacka, Urszula Lesiak (POL)
7 January 2023; 20:00	1× (yellow card) 5× (suspension)	Report	2× (suspension)	Hódos Imre Sports Hall, Debrecen; Attendance: 1,800; Referees: Malgorzata Lidacka, Urszula Lesiak (POL)

15 January 2023; 16:00	Podravka (Croatia)	20–26	DVSC Schaeffler	Sports Hall Fran Galović, Koprivnica; Attendance: 1,300; Referees: Christian Hannes, David Hannes (GER)
15 January 2023; 16:00	three players 3	(7–11)	Töpfner 7	Sports Hall Fran Galović, Koprivnica; Attendance: 1,300; Referees: Christian Hannes, David Hannes (GER)
15 January 2023; 16:00	1× (yellow card) 2× (suspension)	Report	2× (yellow card) 2× (suspension)	Sports Hall Fran Galović, Koprivnica; Attendance: 1,300; Referees: Christian Hannes, David Hannes (GER)

22 January 2023; 18:00	Sola (Norway)	30–25	DVSC Schaeffler	Stavanger Idrettshall, Stavanger; Attendance: 2,000; Referees: Ivars Cernavskis, Edmunds Bogdanovs (LAT)
22 January 2023; 18:00	Kristiansen Tveiten, Rushfeldt Deila 7	(19–13)	Planéta 5	Stavanger Idrettshall, Stavanger; Attendance: 2,000; Referees: Ivars Cernavskis, Edmunds Bogdanovs (LAT)
22 January 2023; 18:00	1× (yellow card) 1× (suspension)	Report	3× (suspension)	Stavanger Idrettshall, Stavanger; Attendance: 2,000; Referees: Ivars Cernavskis, Edmunds Bogdanovs (LAT)

4 February 2023; 20:00	DVSC Schaeffler	25–21	Sola (Norway)	Hódos Imre Sports Hall, Debrecen; Attendance: 2,100; Referees: Pinar Ünlü Hatipoglu, Mehtap Simsek (TUR)
4 February 2023; 20:00	three players 4	(13–13)	four players 4	Hódos Imre Sports Hall, Debrecen; Attendance: 2,100; Referees: Pinar Ünlü Hatipoglu, Mehtap Simsek (TUR)
4 February 2023; 20:00	2× (yellow card) 5× (suspension)	Report	4× (suspension)	Hódos Imre Sports Hall, Debrecen; Attendance: 2,100; Referees: Pinar Ünlü Hatipoglu, Mehtap Simsek (TUR)

11 February 2023; 16:00	Nykøbing Falster (Denmark)	34–22	DVSC Schaeffler	Lånlet Arena, Maribo; Attendance: 600; Referees: Georgi Doychinov, Yulian Goretsov (BUL)
11 February 2023; 16:00	Halilcevic 10	(14–10)	Kácsor 8	Lånlet Arena, Maribo; Attendance: 600; Referees: Georgi Doychinov, Yulian Goretsov (BUL)
11 February 2023; 16:00	1× (yellow card) 3× (suspension)	Report	1× (yellow card) 5× (suspension)	Lånlet Arena, Maribo; Attendance: 600; Referees: Georgi Doychinov, Yulian Goretsov (BUL)

19 February 2023; 18:00	DVSC Schaeffler	32–31	Podravka (Croatia)	Hódos Imre Sports Hall, Debrecen; Attendance: 1,900; Referees: Viktorija Kijauskaite, Ausra Zaliene (LTU)
19 February 2023; 18:00	Kácsor 9	(19–15)	four players 5	Hódos Imre Sports Hall, Debrecen; Attendance: 1,900; Referees: Viktorija Kijauskaite, Ausra Zaliene (LTU)
19 February 2023; 18:00	1× (yellow card) 3× (suspension)	Report	3× (suspension)	Hódos Imre Sports Hall, Debrecen; Attendance: 1,900; Referees: Viktorija Kijauskaite, Ausra Zaliene (LTU)

==== Results overview ====
Opposition	Home score	Away score	Double
(Denmark) Nykøbing Falster	28–27	34–22	50–61
(Croatia) Podravka	32–31	20–26	58–51
(Norway) Sola	25–21	30–25	50–51

== Statistics ==
=== Top scorers ===
Includes all competitive matches. The list is sorted by shirt number when total goals are equal. Last updated on 28 May 2023.

Position	Nation	No.	Name	Hungarian League	Hungarian Cup	EHF European League	Total
1	(Hungary)	28	Alexandra Töpfner	130	11	23	164
2	(Hungary)	44	Gréta Kácsor	103	23	35	161
3	(Hungary)	43	Szimonetta Planéta	90	18	26	134
4	(Hungary)	38	Petra Vámos	75	10	14	99
5	(Hungary)	71	Mirtill Petrus	66	12	9	87
6	(Hungary)	81	Nina Szabó	54	9	4	67
7	(Hungary)	5	Konszuéla Hámori	49	6	10	65
8	(Hungary)	18	Réka Bordás	48	5	11	64
9	(Hungary)	13	Petra Füzi-Tóvizi	42	8	10	60
10	(Brazil)	88	Mariana Costa	36	5	12	53

=== Attendances ===
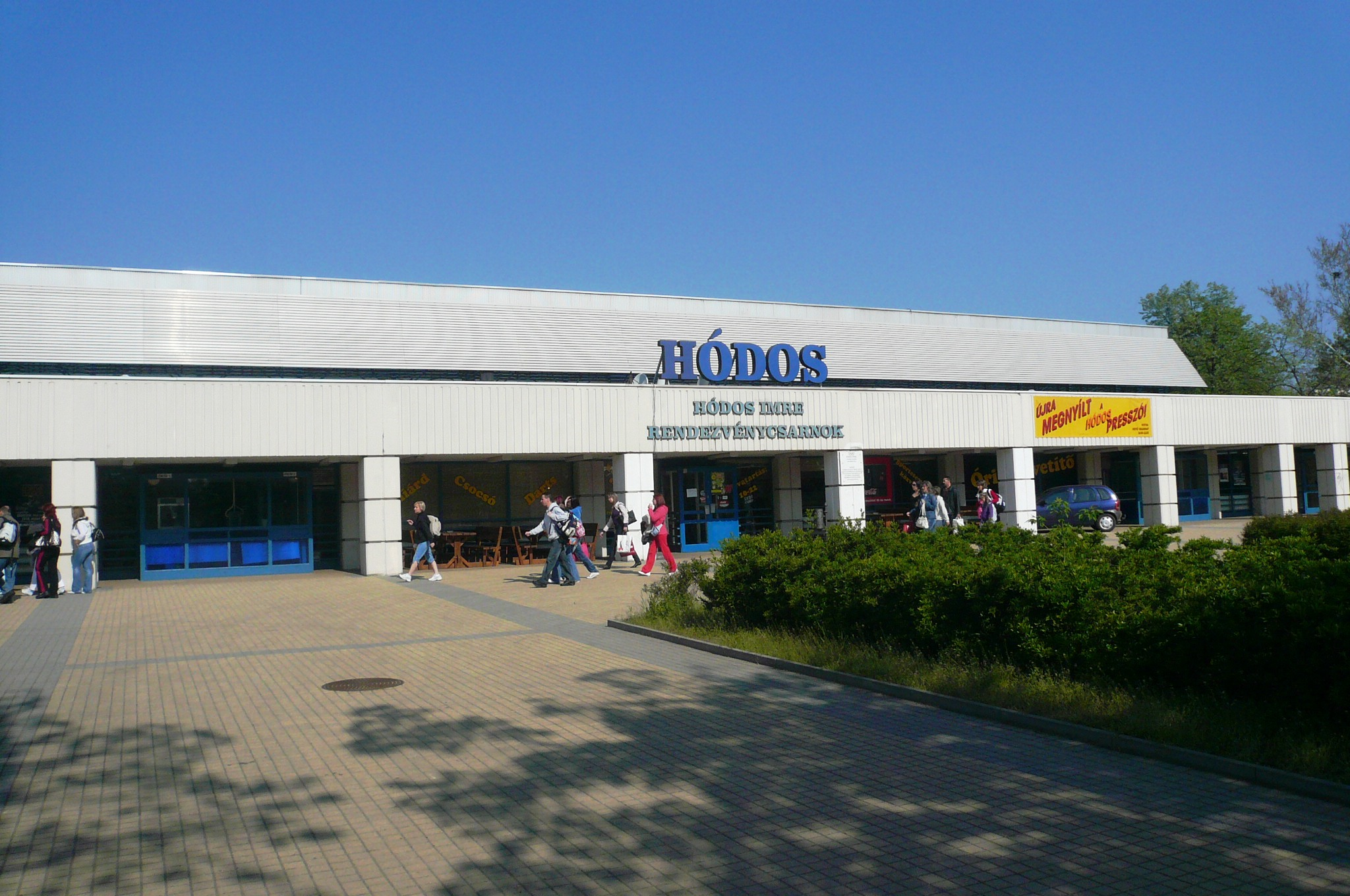
Home hall: Hódos Imre Sports Hall

List of the home matches:

Round	Against	Attendance	Capatility	Date
NB I- 1.	Fehérvár	1,100	48,9%	2 September 2022
NB I- 2.	MTK Budapest	1,000	44,4%	9 September 2022
NB I- 13.	Dunaújváros	900	40,0%	16 September 2022
NB I- 3.	Mosonmagyaróvár	1,400	62,2%	23 September 2022
NB I- 5.	Érd	1,500	66,7%	21 October 2022
NB I- 7.	Vác	1,200	53,3%	27 December 2022
NB I- 9.	Győr	2,000	88,9%	30 December 2022
EL G- 1.	Nykøbing Falster (Denmark)	1,800	80,0%	7 January 2023
NB I- 12.	Békéscsaba	1,500	66,7%	26 January 2023
NB I- 11.	Kisvárda	1,000	44,4%	29 January 2023
EL G- 2.	Sola (Norway)	2,100	93,3%	4 February 2023
CUP R4	Dunaújváros	800	35,5%	15 February 2023
EL G- 3.	Podravka (Croatia)	1,900	84,4%	19 February 2023
NB I- 17.	Budaörs	800	35,5%	10 March 2023
CUP QF	Siófok	1,200	53,3%	29 March 2023
NB I- 21.	NEKA	800	35,5%	16 April 2023
NB I- 19.	Siófok	1,000	44,4%	27 April 2023
NB I- 23.	Ferencváros	1,800	80,0%	2 May 2023
