= Zoltán Szilágyi (handball coach) =

Hungarian handball coach

Personal information
- Nationality: Hungarian
- Born: 3 October 1972 (age 54)

Sport
- Sport: Handball
- Current club: Debreceni VSC; Hungary (Assistant coach)

Teams managed
- Years: Team
- 2007–2016: Dabas KK
- 2016–2021: Váci NKSE
- 2021–: Debreceni VSC
- 2022–2024: Hungary junior
- 2024–: Hungary (Assistant coach)

Zoltán Szilágyi (born 3 October 1972) is a Hungarian handball coach. He is the current head coach of Debreceni VSC and national coach of the Hungarian women's national junior handball team. He has also coached Váci NKSE and the men's handball team Dabas KK for 8 seasons in the Nemzeti Bajnokság I.

In December 2020, it was announced that Szilágyi had signed two-year contract with top-tier team Debreceni VSC for the 2021/22 season. In October 2022, he extended his contract with the club until 2025, after he managed to win the club's first medal in the Nemzeti Bajnokság I for the 2021–22 season, receiving a bronze medal.

In September 2022, he was also appointed as successor for successful national junior head coach Vladimir Golovin in the position of the Hungarian women's national junior handball team.

On September 23, 2024, Szilágyi accepted the invitation of national coach Vladimir Golovin to become the assistant coach of the Hungary women's national handball team.

== Statistics ==
As of match played 24 May 2025

In italics, we indicate achieved in competition(s) that have not yet been completed.

Statistics by season and competition
Team	Season	Competition	Record								
Team	Season	Competition	Pld	W	D	L	GF	GA	GD	P	Win %
Debreceni VSC	2021–22	Nemzeti Bajnokság I	26	21	0	5	758	636	+122	42	80.77
Debreceni VSC	2021–22	Domestic Cup	2	1	0	1	58	53	+5	–	50.00
Debreceni VSC	2021–22	EHF European League	2	0	1	1	43	47	-4	–	0.00
Debreceni VSC	2021–22	Season total	30	22	1	7	859	736	+123	42	73.33
Debreceni VSC	2022–23	Nemzeti Bajnokság I	26	18	3	5	778	633	+145	39	69.23
Debreceni VSC	2022–23	Domestic Cup	4	3	0	1	124	101	+23	–	75.00
Debreceni VSC	2022–23	EHF European League	6	4	0	2	158	163	-5	–	66.67
Debreceni VSC	2022–23	Season total	36	25	3	8	1,058	897	+161	39	69.44
Debreceni VSC	2023–24	Nemzeti Bajnokság I	26	21	0	5	833	652	+181	42	80.77
Debreceni VSC	2023–24	Domestic Cup	4	2	1	1	124	107	+17	–	50.00
Debreceni VSC	2023–24	EHF Champions League	16	7	2	7	449	470	-21	–	43.75
Debreceni VSC	2023–24	Season total	46	30	3	13	1,406	1,229	+177	42	65.22
Debreceni VSC	2024–25	Nemzeti Bajnokság I	26	20	2	4	851	691	+160	42	76.92
Debreceni VSC	2024–25	Domestic Cup	2	1	0	1	61	53	+8	–	50.00
Debreceni VSC	2024–25	EHF European League	2	0	0	2	59	64	-5	–	0.00
Debreceni VSC	2024–25	Season total	30	21	2	7	971	808	+160	42	76.92
Debreceni VSC	2025–26	Nemzeti Bajnokság I	0	0	0	0	0	0	0	0	0.00
Debreceni VSC	2025–26	Domestic Cup	0	0	0	0	0	0	0	–	0.00
Debreceni VSC	2025–26	EHF Champions League	0	0	0	0	0	0	0	–	0.00
Debreceni VSC	2025–26	Season total	0	0	0	0	0	0	0	0	0.00
Debreceni VSC	Total		142	98	9	35	4,294	3,670	+624	165	69.01
Career totals			142	98	9	35	4,294	3,670	+624	165	69.01
