= Océane Sercien-Ugolin =

French handball player (born 1997)

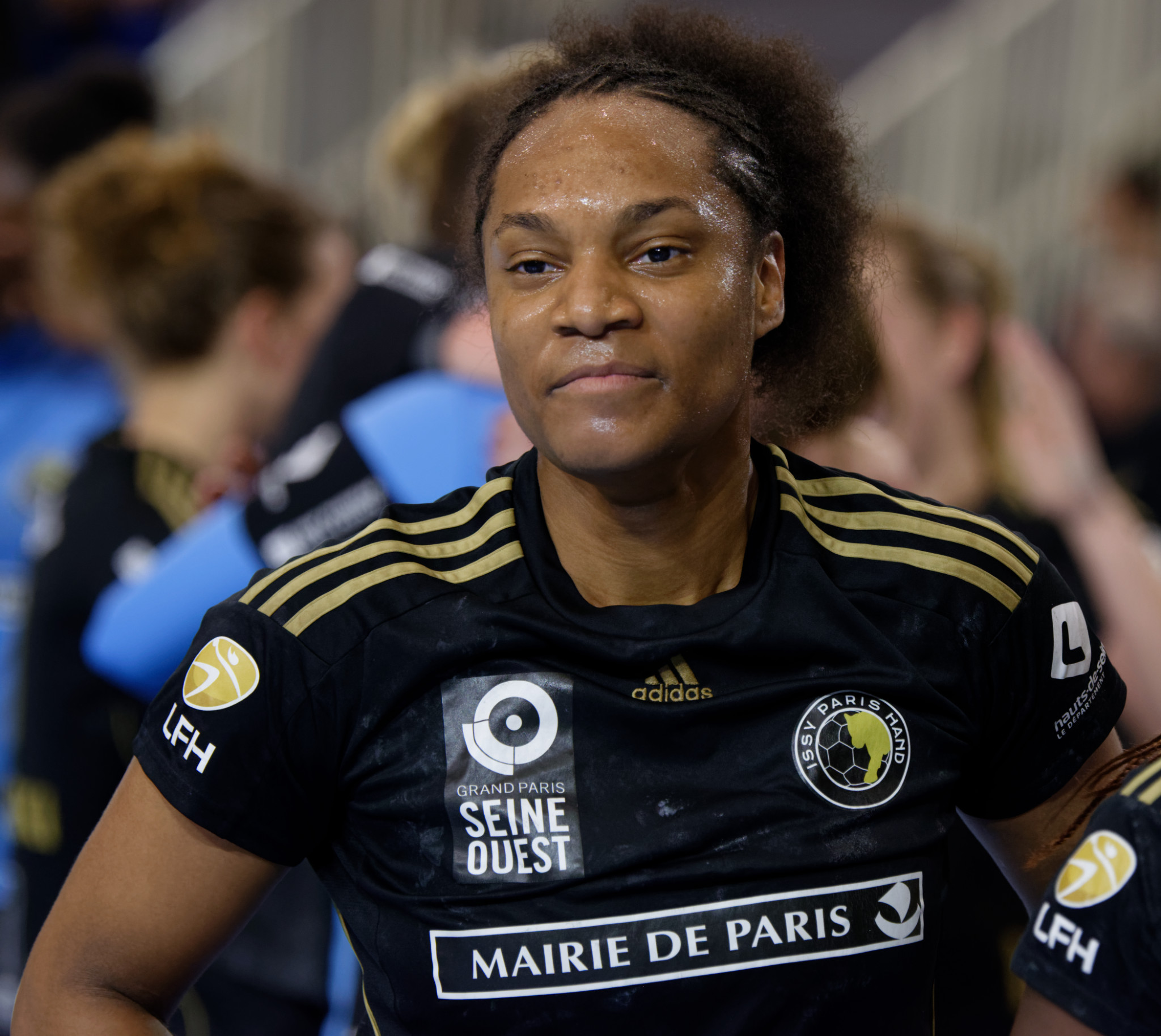
- Sercien-Ugolin in 2017

Personal information
- Nationality: French
- Born: 15 December 1997 (age 28) Cherbourg-Octeville, France
- Height: 1.75 m (5 ft 9 in)

Sport
- Sport: Handball
- Position: Right back
- Current club: Vipers Kristiansand
- Number: 6

Senior clubs
- Years: Team
- 2016–2020: Paris 92
- 2020–2022: RK Krim
- 2022–2024: Vipers Kristiansand
- 2024–: Debrecen
National team
Years	Team	Apps	(Gls)
2019–	France	69	(113)
Medal record
Olympic Games
Gold medal – first place	2020 Tokyo	Team
World Championship
Gold medal – first place	2023 Denmark/Norway/Sweden
Silver medal – second place	2021 Spain
European Championship
Silver medal – second place	2020 Denmark
- Updated on 12 November 2024

Océane Sercien-Ugolin (born 15 December 1997) is a French professional handball player for Debrecen and the French national team. She competed at the 2020 Summer Olympics, winning a gold medal in Women's team handball.

== Career ==
In April 2017, she was called up to the France team for the first time, but was injured. She was finally recalled in May 2018 to participate in two friendly matches against Norway.

She played for Issy Paris Handball until 2020, she signed in June 2018. In 2020, she went to Slovenia to play for RK Krim.

She participated in the 2019 World Women's Handball Championship.

At the 2021 Olympics she was part of the French team that won Gold medals, the first for France.

== Achievements ==
- EHF Champions League:
  - Gold: 2022/2023
- Norwegian League:
  - Gold: 2022/2023, 2023/2024
- Norwegian Cup:
  - Winner: 2022/23, 2023/24
