= Daniela de Jong =

Swedish handball player (born 1998)

Personal information
- Full name: Daniela Isabelle de Jong
- Nationality: Swedish
- Born: 1 September 1998 (age 28) Stockholm, Sweden
- Height: 1.77 m (5 ft 10 in)

Sport
- Sport: Handball
- Position: Centre back

Senior clubs
- Years: Team
- 2015–2022: Skuru IK
- 2022–2025: SCM Râmnicu Vâlcea
National team
Years	Team	Apps	(Gls)
2021–	Sweden	24	(37)
- Updated on 31 October 2024

Daniela de Jong (born 1 September 1998) is a Swedish handball player for and the Swedish national team and currently without a club while rehabilitating a back injury, after she signed a 2 years contract with Debreceni VSC, but she never played an official game for the Hungarian club and they terminated the agreement after 6 months.

She represented Sweden at the 2021 World Women's Handball Championship and the 2023 World Women's Handball Championship.

== Achievements ==
- Swedish Handball League:
  - Gold medalist: 2021
- Swedish Handball Cup:
  - Gold medalist: 2022
