= Anna Szántó =

Hungarian handball player (born 1966)

Personal information
- Born: 24 November 1966 (age 59) Mátészalka, Hungary

Sport
- Sport: Handball
- Position: Left wing
- Current club: Retired

Senior clubs
- Years: Team
- 1982–1993: Debreceni VSC
- 1993–1997: Győri ETO
National team
Years	Team	Apps	(Gls)
1987–1996	Hungary	98	(161)
Medal record
Women's handball
Representing Hungary
Olympic Games
Bronze medal – third place	1996 Atlanta	Team
World Championship
Silver medal – second place	1995 Austria/Hungary	Team

Anna Szántó (born 24 November 1966 in Mátészalka) is a former Hungarian handball player (left wing) who competed in the 1996 Summer Olympics, where she collected the bronze medal with the Hungarian team. She played four matches and scored seven goals.
