= Alicia Toublanc =

French handball player (born 1996)

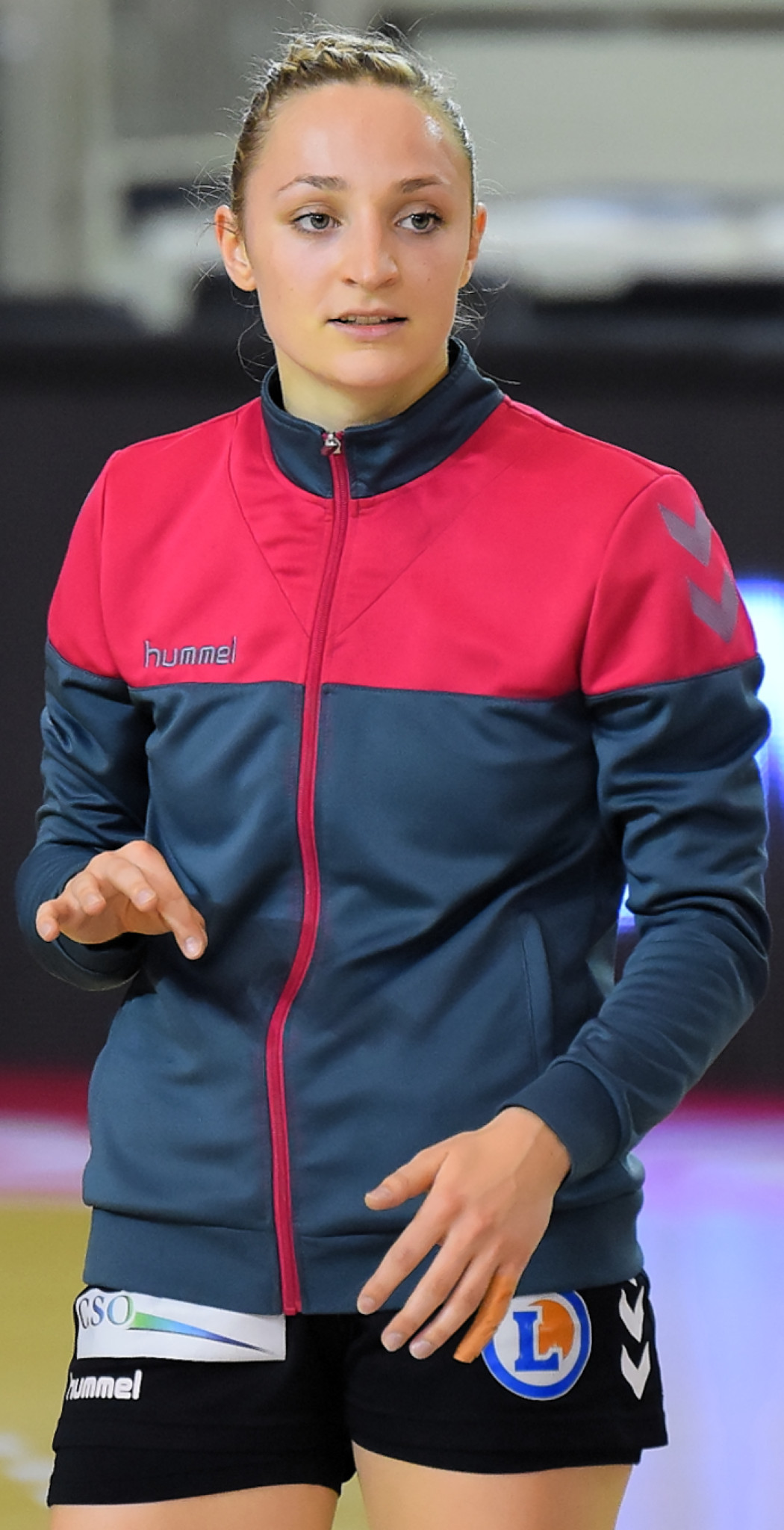
- Toublanc in 2017

Personal information
- Full name: Alicia Toublanc-Nicolas
- Nationality: French
- Born: 3 May 1996 (age 30) Saint-Brieuc, France
- Height: 1.68 m (5 ft 6 in)

Sport
- Sport: Handball
- Position: Right wing
- Current club: Debreceni VSC
- Number: 3

Youth career
- Years: Team
- –2012: ALS Plouagat HB
- 2012–2013: Plouvorn HB
- 2014–2015: Landi / Lampaul HB
- 2014–2015: Brest Bretagne Handball

Senior clubs
- Years: Team
- 2015–2024: Brest Bretagne Handball
- 2024–2025: SCM Râmnicu Vâlcea
- 2025–: Debreceni VSC
National team
Years	Team	Apps	(Gls)
2021–	France	70	(192)
Medal record
Olympic Games
Silver medal – second place	2024 Paris	Team
World Championship
Gold medal – first place	2023 Denmark/Norway/Sweden
Silver medal – second place	2021 Spain
Bronze medal – third place	2025 Germany/Netherlands
- Updated on 26 October 2025

Alicia Toublanc-Nicolas (born 3 May 1996) is a French handball player who plays for Debreceni VSC and the French national team as a right wing.

== Career and personal life ==
She joined the Brest Bretagne Handball academy in 2014 and signed her first professional contract in 2017.

She suffered from an anterior cruciate ligament (ACL) injury twice in her career, on the same knee, in 2015 and 2017.

With the French national team, she won a gold medal at the 2023 World Championship, and a silver one at the 2021 World Championship.

She won the French league and the French Cup with her club Brest.

For the 2025 World Championship she won bronze medals losing to Germany in the semifinal and beating Netherlands in extra time in the third place playoff.

== Achievements ==
=== Club ===
==== International ====
- EHF Champions League
  - Finalist: 2021 (with Brest Bretagne Handball)

==== Domestic ====
- French league:
  - Winner (gold) : 2021 (with Brest Bretagne Handball)
  - Tied 1st: 2020 (with Brest Bretagne Handball)
  - Runner up: 2017, 2018 and 2022 (with Brest Bretagne Handball)
- French Cup (Coupe de France):
  - Winner (gold) : 2016, 2018 and 2021 (with Brest Bretagne Handball)
  - Runner up: 2019 (with Brest Bretagne Handball)
- French 2nd division league (Division 2 Féminine):
  - Winner (gold) : 2016 (with Brest Bretagne Handball)

=== National team ===
- World Championship:
  - 2021: Silver
  - 2023: Gold
  - 2025: Bronze
- European Championship
  - 2022: 4th

== Individual awards ==
- All-Star right wing of the Summer Olympics: 2024
- French league:
  - Player of the Month: May 2022
  - 7 Majeur de la semaine (Best 7 Players of the week): Day 7 of 2019/20; Day 2&11 of 2020/21; Day 24 of 2021/22; Day 4&11 of 2022/23
- EHF Champions League:
  - 2022-23 Season:
    - Best 7 Players of the Round - Best Right Wing: R7, R8
