= Réka Bordás =

Hungarian handball player (born 1997)

Personal information
- Nationality: Hungarian
- Born: 26 August 1997 (age 29) Karcag, Hungary
- Height: 1.84 m (6 ft 0 in)

Sport
- Sport: Handball
- Position: Pivot
- Current club: Váci NKSE
- Number: 58

Senior clubs
- Years: Team
- 2017–2023: Debreceni VSC
- 2023–: Ferencvárosi TC
- 2023, 2024: → Váci NKSE (loan)
National team
Years	Team	Apps	(Gls)
2021–	Hungary	80	(64)
Medal record
European Championship
Bronze medal – third place	2024 Austria/Hungary/Switzerland
- Updated on 16 December 2024

Réka Bordás (born 26 August 1997) is a Hungarian handball player who plays for Váci NKSE and the Hungarian national team. She competed in the 2020 Summer Olympics.

Her father, József Bordás also played handball and represented Hungary on more than 100 occasions.

She made her international debut on 6 July 2021 against Montenegro. At the 2024 European Championship she was part of the Hungarian team that won bronze medals, losing to Norway in semifinal and beating France in the third place play-off. This was the first Hungarian medals since 2012.
