= Kristin Thorleifsdóttir =

Swedish handball player (born 1998)

Personal information
- Nationality: Swedish
- Born: 13 January 1998 (age 28) Stockholm, Sweden
- Height: 1.82 m (6 ft 0 in)

Sport
- Sport: Handball
- Position: Left back
- Current club: Debreceni VSC

Youth career
- Years: Team
- –: Rimbo HK
- –: Rosersbergs IK

Senior clubs
- Years: Team
- 2015–2017: Skånela IF
- 2017–2020: H 65 Höörs HK
- 2020–2021: Randers HK
- 2021–2024: HH Elite
- 2024–: Debreceni VSC
National team
Years	Team	Apps	(Gls)
2019–	Sweden	81	(112)

Kristin Thorleifsdóttir (born 13 January 1998) is a Swedish female handballer for Debreceni VSC and the Swedish national team.

Thorleifsdóttir represented Sweden at the 2017 Women's U-19 European Handball Championship, placing 9th and at the 2018 Women's Junior World Handball Championship, placing 12th.

She also represented Sweden at the 2020 European Women's Handball Championship.
