= Ann-Cathrin Giegerich =

German handball player (born 1992)

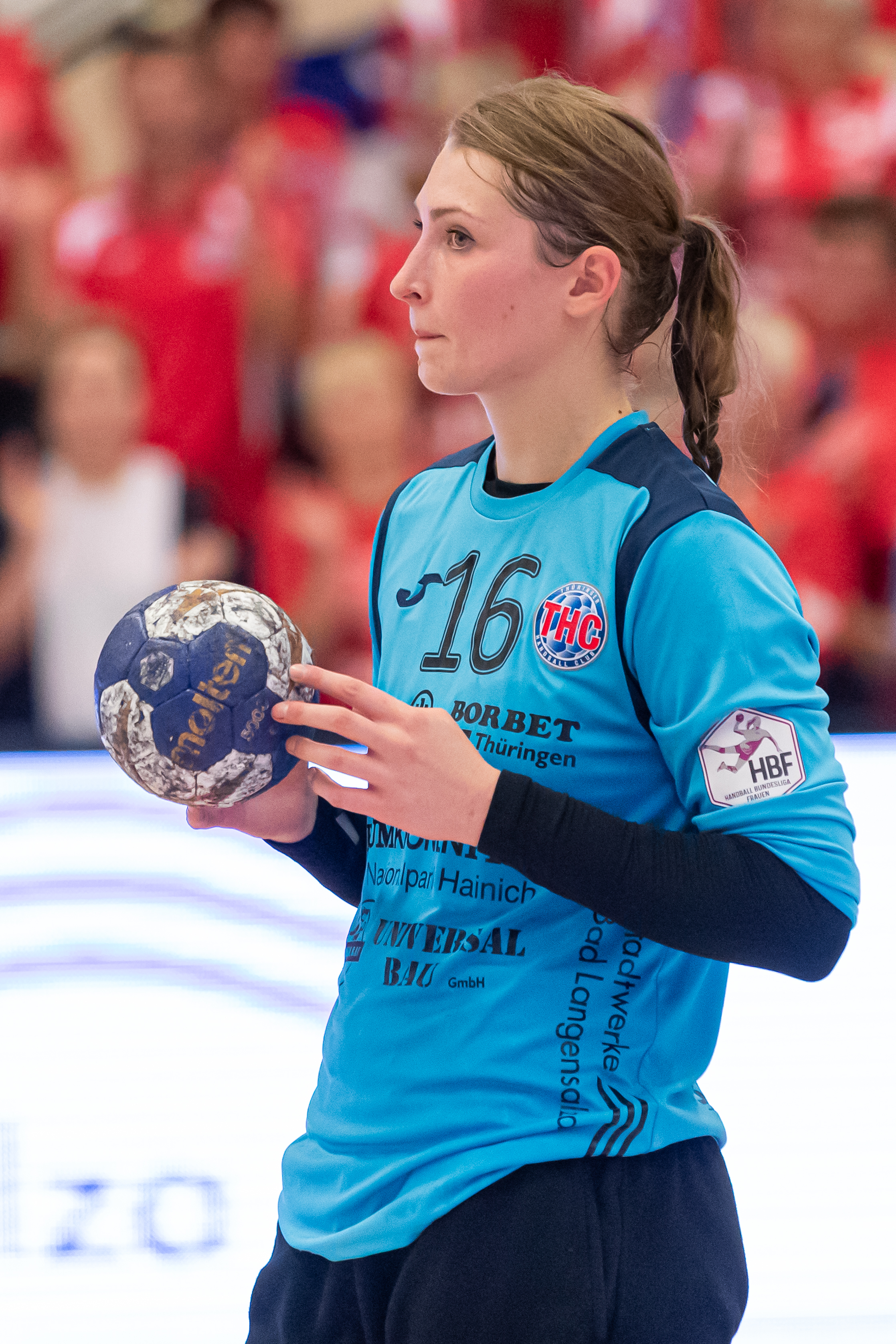

Personal information
- Nationality: German
- Born: 4 January 1992 (age 34) Erlenbach, Germany
- Height: 1.80 m (5 ft 11 in)

Sport
- Sport: Handball
- Position: Goalkeeper
- Current club: JDA Dijon
- Number: 16

Senior clubs
- Years: Team
- 2009–2010: TV Mainzlar
- 2010–2011: HSG Sulzbach/Leidersbach
- 2011–2017: SG BBM Bietigheim
- 2017–2018: Neckarsulmer SU
- 2018–2020: Thüringer HC
- 2020–2023: Debreceni VSC
- 2023–2024: ŽRK Budućnost
- 2024–: JDA Dijon
National team
Years	Team	Apps	(Gls)
2012–	Germany	10	(0)

Ann-Cathrin Giegerich (born 4 January 1992) is a German handball goalkeeper, who plays for French club JDA Dijon and the German national team.
