= Debreceni VSC (women's handball) =

Hungarian handball club

DVSC Skyline
- Full name: Debreceni Vasutas Sport Club
- Nickname: Loki
- Short name: DVSC
- Founded: 1948; 78 years ago
- Arena: Hódos Imre Sports Hall, Debrecen
- Capacity: 2,250
- President: (Hungary) Zsolt Ábrók
- Head coach: (Hungary) Zoltán Szilágyi
- League: Nemzeti Bajnokság I
- 2025–26: (bronze) 3rd in Nemzeti Bajnokság I
- Club colours
Home	Away

Debreceni Vasutas Sport Club, commonly abbreviated DVSC, is a Hungarian professional women's handball club from Debrecen, that plays in the Nemzeti Bajnokság I.

Since June 2026 they are sponsored by Skyline Tickets, so the official name for the team is DVSC Skyline.

Location of DVSC SCHAEFFLER

== History ==
Nicknamed Loki, the team was founded in 1948 as a department of the multi-sports club Debreceni VSC. Seven years later, they have won their first ever Hungarian championship title after beating two of their three opponents in the championship final, including title holders Csepeli SK. However, this achievement remained the lone success of the club for a long time, after they got relegated in 1959 and spent the subsequent twenty years in the second division.

Promoted back in 1979, their brightest period came under the management of Ákos Komáromi, between the late eighties and mid-nineties, during which time they won the Hungarian championship, five Hungarian cups, and two consecutive EHF Cups. The latter one is an exceptional success; no other teams have ever defended their title in the EHF Cup.

In the following years, the club lost many of their key players and their financial options narrowed as well, which resulted a significant setback. The team was on the brink of bankruptcy, when András Gellén, a businessman and die-hard DVSC fan took over the club in May 2009.

Gellén had his own conception, that built solely on Hungarian players and promoted the youngsters. To fulfil the club's long-term plans, he also invested into a new arena for the handball academy, which was finished in January 2011 and cost around €1.4 million.

In the second part of 2011, however, DVSC faced a heavy financial crisis as Gellén could not pay the wages, and as a result, many of the first team players left. Gellén eventually sold his 63.3% share to the city of Debrecen for a nominal fee of 10 Hungarian Forint, that now owns 96.4% of the club. The city worked out a long-term project, which similarly to the club's former intention wants to build on home-grown players. The budget in the first season is expected to be around 100 million Forint (approximately €330,000), which may grow to 150–180 million (€500,000–600,000) in the coming years to ensure Debrecen to achieve a podium finish and to qualify to a European cup again. Balázs Makray took the chairman duties, who faced the similar situation in 1999 when he took over the local football club, and for the 2000s he made Debreceni VSC one of the dominant team in the Hungarian league.

== Ranking ==
On 25 June 2026, the EHF published the European Women's Club Rankings, according to which DVSC is the 17th best team in Europe. The list, which includes 162 club names, was compiled based on international results. Clubs are ranked according to their achievements, respectively the collected points in the previous three European cup seasons (currently 2025/26, 2024/25, 2023/24).

== Crest, colours, supporters ==
=== Kit manufacturers and Shirt sponsor ===
The following table shows in detail Debreceni VSC kit manufacturers and shirt sponsors by year:

Period	Kit manufacturer	Shirt sponsor
	Kempa	
2004–2005	Kempa	debmut / G HBZ
2005–2006	Kempa	Hotel Balmaz / debmut / G HBZ
2006–2007	Kempa	Hotel Balmaz / debmut
2007–2008	Puma	Hotel Balmaz
2008–2009	Erreà	Hotel Balmaz
2009–2010	Erreà	Korvex / Hajdú Takarék
2010–2011	Erreà	Korvex
2011–2012	Erreà	Korvex / Hajdú Takarék
2012–2013	Erreà	OTP Bank
2013–2014	Erreà	TvP / OTP Bank
2014–2015	Erima	TvP / Aquaticum
2015	Erima	TvP / Cívis Ház
2016–2018	Erima	TvP / Cívis Ház / Szerencsejáték Zrt.
2018–2024	Adidas	Schaeffler
2024–	Kappa	Schaeffler

== Kits ==
HOME
2007–08	2010–12	2012–13	2017–18	2018–20	2020-21	2023–24

AWAY
2007–08	2010–11	2011–12	2012–13	2017–18	2018–20	2020–21	2023–24

THIRD
2007–08	2014–15	2017–18	2018–19	2019–20	2020–

== Team ==
=== Current squad ===
Squad for the 2026–27 season

- (Hungary) Head coach: Zoltán Szilágyi
- (Hungary) Assistant coach: Kitti Kudor
- (Serbia) Goalkeeping coach: Grega Karpan
- (Hungary) Masseur: Attila Kazsimér

Goalkeepers (GK)

- 12 (Sweden) Jessica Ryde
- 93 (Poland) Adrianna Płaczek
- 85 (Hungary) Gréta Majoros

Left wingers (LW)

- 24 (Hungary) Míra Vámos
- 71 (Hungary) Mirtill Petrus

Right wingers (RW)

- 3 (France) Alicia Toublanc
- 26 (Hungary) Luca Ratalics
- 10 (Hungary) Petra Keller

Line players (LP)

- 9 (Hungary) Kata Juhász
- 13 (Hungary) Petra Füzi-Tóvizi (c)

Left backs (LB)

- 14 (Austria) Ines Ivančok-Šoltić
- 22 (Serbia) Jovana Jovović
- 29 (Sweden) Kristin Thorleifsdóttir

Centre backs (CB)

- 25 (Hungary) Liliána Csernyánszki
- 81 (Hungary) Nina Szabó
- 37 (Hungary) Dorottya Baranyi

Right backs (RB)

- 5 (Hungary) Konszuéla Hámori
- 8 (Poland) Monika Kobylińska

=== Transfers ===
Transfers for the 2027–28 season

Joining

Leaving

- (France) Alicia Toublanc (RW) (to (France) Brest Bretagne Handball)

== Honours ==
=== Domestic competitions ===
Nemzeti Bajnokság I (National Championship of Hungary)

- Champions (2): 1955, 1987
- Runners-up (8): 1985, 1988–89, 1989–90, 1993–94, 1994–95, 1995–96, 2009–10, 2010–11
- Third place (6): 1986, 1990–91, 1992–93, 2008–09, 2021–22, 2022–23

Magyar Kupa (National Cup of Hungary)

- Winners (5): 1985, 1987, 1988–89, 1989–90, 1990–91
- Finalists (8): 1983, 1986, 1988, 1995–96, 2000–01, 2008–09, 2010–11, 2020–21

=== European competitions ===
EHF Cup Winners' Cup

- Runners-up (2): 1989–90, 1991–92

EHF Cup

- Winners (2): 1994–95, 1995–96
- Runners-up (1): 1993–94
- Semifinalists: 2005–06

== Recent seasons ==
As of 26 May 2024

In italics, we indicate achieved in competition(s) that have not yet been completed.

- Seasons in Nemzeti Bajnokság I: 45
- Seasons in Nemzeti Bajnokság I/B: 5
- Seasons in Nemzeti Bajnokság II: 15

Season	Division	Pos.	Magyar kupa
1993–94	NB I	Runner-up	
1994–95	NB I	Runner-up	
1995–96	NB I	Runner-up	Finalist
1996–97	NB I	4th	
1997–98	NB I	5th	
1998–99	NB I	4th	
1999–2000	NB I	4th	
2000–01	NB I	5th	Finalist
2001–02	NB I	5th	
2002–03	NB I	8th	
2003–04	NB I	6th	

Season	Division	Pos.	Magyar kupa
2004–05	NB I	5th	
2005–06	NB I	4th	
2006–07	NB I	5th	
2007–08	NB I	5th	
2008–09	NB I	Third place	Finalist
2009–10	NB I	Runner-up	
2010–11	NB I	Runner-up	Finalist
2011–12	NB I	8th	Quarter-finals
2012–13	NB I	11th	Quarter-finals
2013–14	NB I	9th	Quarter-finals
2014–15	NB I	7th	Quarter-finals

Season	Division	Pos.	Magyar kupa
2015–16	NB I	4th	Round 4
2016–17	NB I	7th	Third place
2017–18	NB I	9th	Round 4
2018–19	NB I	6th	Round 4
2019–20	NB I	Cancelled	
2020–21	NB I	5th	Finalist
2021–22	NB I	Third place	Quarter-finals
2022–23	NB I	Third place	Third place
2023–24	NB I	4th	Third place
2024–25	NB I	4th	Quarter-finals
2025–26	NB I	TBD	Pre-season

=== In European competition ===
- Participations in Champions League (Champions Cup): 4x
- Participations in EHF European League (IHF Cup, EHF Cup): 19x
- Participations in Challenge Cup (City Cup): 1x
- Participations in Cup Winners' Cup (IHF Cup Winners' Cup): 9x

Season	Competition	Round	Club	Home	Away	Agg/Pos.
2025–26	EHF Champions League	Group A	(Norway) Storhamar HE	v	v	TBD
2025–26	EHF Champions League	Group A	(France) Metz Handball	v	v	TBD
2025–26	EHF Champions League	Group A	(Hungary) Győri ETO KC	v	v	TBD
2025–26	EHF Champions League	Group A	(Germany) Borussia Dortmund	v	v	TBD
2025–26	EHF Champions League	Group A	(Denmark) Team Esbjerg	v	v	TBD
2025–26	EHF Champions League	Group A	(Romania) CS Gloria Bistrița	v	v	TBD
2025–26	EHF Champions League	Group A	(Montenegro) ŽRK Budućnost Podgorica	v	v	TBD

== Records ==
=== Most league appearances ===
Rank	Name	Apps	Goals
1	(Hungary) Tünde Nyilas	329	457
2	(Hungary) Rózsa Tóth	290	666
3	(Hungary) Márta Sáfi	256	715
4	(Hungary) Mária Jeddi	255	1045
4	(Ukraine) Irina Szamozvanova	255	8
6	(Hungary) Erika Csapó	243	1146
7	(Hungary) Ilona Eperjesi	233	497
8	(Hungary) Anna Szántó	215	838
9	(Hungary) Katalin Szilágyi	199	838
10	(Hungary) Zsuzsa Nagy	197	640
10	(Hungary) Gabriella Szűcs	197	914

=== Top league goalscorers ===
Rank	Name	Apps	Goals
1	(Hungary) Erika Csapó	243	1146
2	(Hungary) Mária Jeddi	255	1045
3	(Hungary) Katalin Szilágyi	199	1036
4	(Hungary) Gabriella Szűcs	197	914
5	(Hungary) Annamária Bogdanovics	182	866
6	(Hungary) Anna Szántó	215	838
7	(Hungary) Márta Sáfi	256	715
8	(Hungary) Rózsa Tóth	290	666
9	(Hungary) Zsuzsa Nagy	197	640
10	(Hungary) Rita Borók	147	573

== Notable players ==
=== Goalkeepers ===
- (Hungary) Bettina Pásztor
- (Hungary) Éva Kiss
- (Hungary) Melinda Pastrovics
- (Hungary) Viktória Oguntoye
- (Hungary) Ágnes Triffa
- (Hungary) Tímea Sugár
- (Hungary) Vivien Víg
- (Hungary) Mária Barkasziné Szász
- (Hungary) Annamária Király
- (Hungary) Erika Kalocsai
- (Hungary) Brigitta Szopóczy
- (Hungary) Györgyi Hang
- (Hungary) Kyra Csapó
- (Germany) Ann-Cathrin Giegerich
- (Ukraine) Irina Samozvanova
- (Ukraine) Tetyana Vorozhtsova
- (Ukraine) Irina Uvarovska

=== Right wings ===
- (Hungary) Katalin Szilágyi
- (Hungary) Edina Kereki
- (Hungary) Viktória Csáki
- (Hungary) Krisztina Nagy
- (Hungary) Nóra Varsányi
- (Hungary) Petra Slakta
- (Hungary) Alexandra Töpfner
- (Hungary) Zsuzsanna Pálffy
- (Serbia) Nada Micic
- (Brazil) Mariana Costa

=== Right backs ===
- (Hungary) Beatrix Benyáts
- (Hungary) Mária Jeddi †
- (Hungary) Viktória Soós
- (Hungary) Rita Borók
- (Hungary) Anita Herr
- (Hungary) Anett Sopronyi
- (Hungary) Anna Kovács
- (Hungary) Szabina Karnik
- (Hungary) Szimonetta Planéta
- (Socialist Federal Republic of Yugoslavia) Danica Nikic
- (Serbia) Dragana Stanisic
- (Romania) Michaela Galai
- (Russia) Anna Punko
- (Sweden) Elinore Johansson
- (Austria) Kristina Dramac

=== Line players ===
- (Hungary) Valéria Szabó
- (Hungary) Petra Madai
- (Hungary) Rita Borbás
- (Hungary) Tünde Nyilas
- (Hungary) Adrienn Gaál
- (Hungary) Réka Bordás
- (Hungary) Szederke Sirián
- (Hungary) Szilvia Ábrahám
- (Hungary) Rózsa Tóth
- (Hungary) Csilla Elekes
- (Slovakia) Janka Caltíková
- (Slovakia) Lucia Uhraková
- (Serbia) Verica Nikolic
- (Iceland) Arna Sif Palsdottir
- (Montenegro) Bobana Klikovac
- (Ukraine) Lilia Gorilska
- (Netherlands) Tamara Haggerty

=== Central backs ===
- (Hungary) Annamária Bogdanović
- (Hungary) Anasztázia Virincsik
- (Hungary) Bernadett Temes
- (Hungary) Barbara Pálos-Bognár
- (Hungary) Kitti Kudor
- (Hungary) Emese Rácz
- (Hungary) Éva Barna
- (Hungary) Nikolett Tóth
- (Hungary) Petra Vámos
- (Belarus) Karyna Yezhykava
- (Denmark) Lotte Grigel
- (Romania) Madalina Zamfirescu
- (Ukraine) Tetyana Shynkarenko
- (Ukraine) Tetyana Mironec
- (Lithuania) Ruta Latakaite
- (Brazil) Deonise Fachinello
- (Croatia) Ivana Lovric

=== Left backs ===
- (Hungary) Zsuzsa Nagy
- (Hungary) Gabriella Szűcs
- (Hungary) Dóra Hornyák
- (Hungary) Erika Csapó
- (Hungary) Vivien Léránt
- (Hungary) Hortenzia Szrnka
- (Hungary) Mária Tóth
- (Hungary) Gréta Kácsor
- (Hungary) Renáta Mörtel
- (Hungary) Anita Bulath
- (Hungary) Eszter Mátéfi
- (Hungary) Nóra Valovics
- (Hungary) Ilona Eperjesi
- (Hungary) Annamária Félix
- (Hungary) Éva Barna
- (Ukraine) Fatima Ovtus
- (Ukraine) Natalya Bodenchuk
- (Russia) Maria Khakunova
- (Romania) Daniela Crap
- (Montenegro) Jelena Despotovic
- (Argentina) Elke Karsten
- (Slovakia) Alžbeta Tóthová
- (Brazil) Juliana Borges Lima
- (Serbia) Marijana Trbojevic

=== Left wings ===
- (Hungary) Anna Szántó
- (Hungary) Olívia Buglyó
- (Hungary) Éva Vantara-Kelemen
- (Hungary) Erika Kirsner
- (Hungary) Ivett Nagy
- (Hungary) Anita Kazai
- (Hungary) Gabriella Juhász
- (Hungary) Dorina Korsós
- (Hungary) Júlia Hársfalvi
- (Hungary) Krisztina László
- (Romania) Alina Marin
- (Slovakia) Dagmar Stuparičová

== Coaches ==
- (Hungary) Ferenc Bokor (1950–68)
- (Hungary) Ferenc Kapitány (1970–71)
- (Hungary) Ferenc Halász (1975–80)
- (Hungary) Géza Szász (1980)
- (Hungary) István Varga (1981)
- (Hungary) János Szentgyörgyi (1981)
- (Hungary) Ákos Komáromi (1982–90, 1991–94, 1997–98, 2000, 2002–03)
- (Slovakia) Dusan Szlancso (1990–91)
- (Hungary) Vilmos Köstner (1994–96, 1998–99, 2010–12, 2018–21)
- (Hungary) Csaba Árva (1997)
- (Hungary) Imre Bíró (1999–2000, 2005–07, 2012–13)
- (Hungary) Sándor Medgyessy (2000–01)
- (Hungary) Sándor Váczi (2001–02)
- (Hungary) Zoltán Balogh (2003–04)
- (Hungary) József Varga (2004, 2007–08, 2013–15)
- (Hungary) László Laurencz (2004–05)
- (Hungary) Botond Bakó (2008–10)
- (Slovenia) Tone Tiselj (2016–18)
- (Hungary) Gergő Vida (2018)
- (Norway) Pal Oldrup Jensen (2018)
- (Hungary) Kitti Kudor (2021)
- (Hungary) Zoltán Szilágyi (2021–)

== See also ==
- Debreceni VSC
