= Petra Tóvizi =

Hungarian handball player (born 1999)

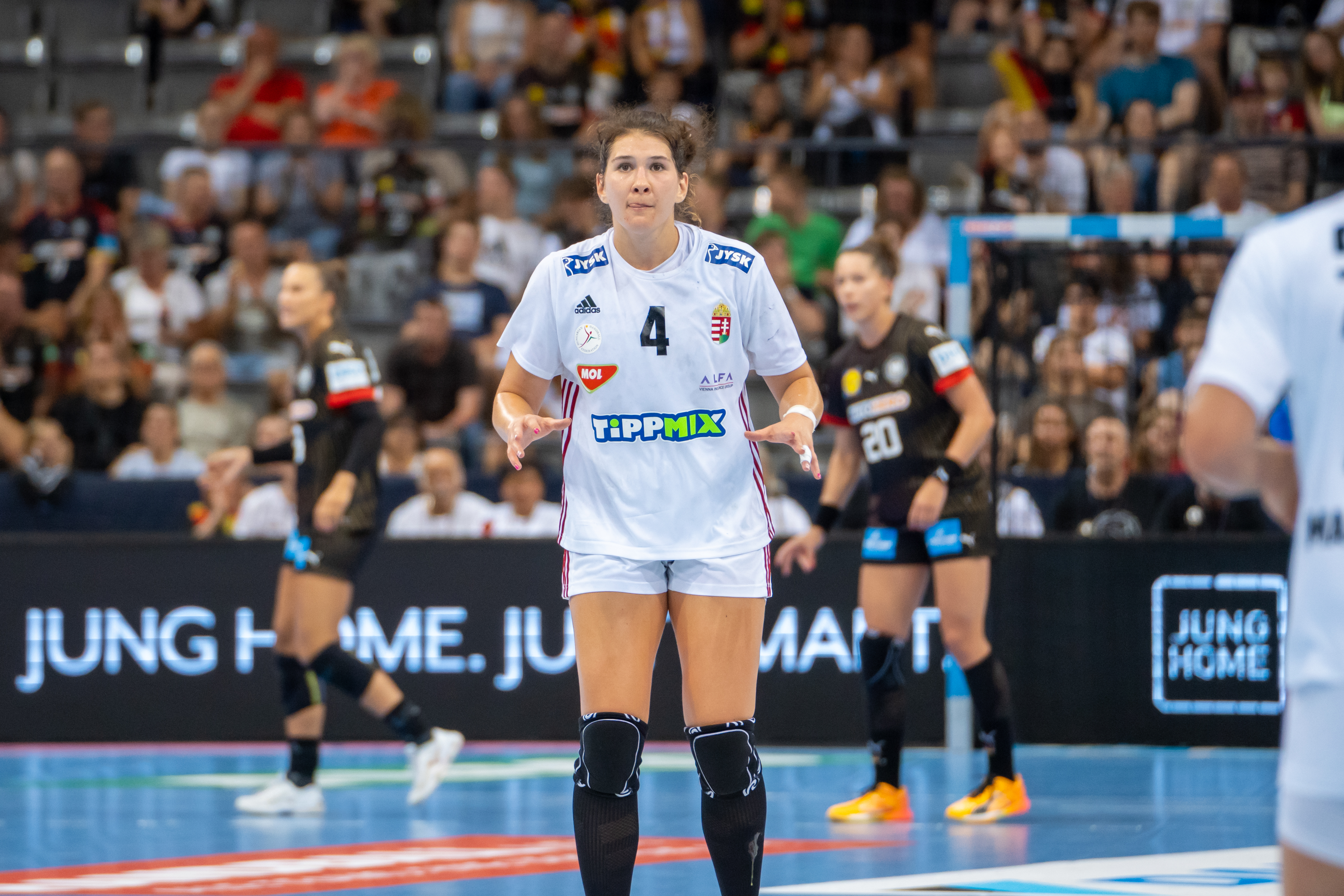

Personal information
- Full name: Petra Anita Tóvizi
- Nationality: Hungarian
- Born: 15 March 1999 (age 27) Nyíregyháza, Hungary
- Height: 1.80 m (5 ft 11 in)

Sport
- Sport: Handball
- Position: Pivot
- Current club: Debreceni VSC
- Number: 13

Youth career
- Years: Team
- –2016: Debreceni VSC

Senior clubs
- Years: Team
- 2016–: Debreceni VSC
National team
Years	Team	Apps	(Gls)
2018–	Hungary	110	(146)
Medal record
European Championship
Bronze medal – third place	2024 Austria/Hungary/Switzerland
Junior World Championship
Gold medal – first place	2018 Hungary
- Updated on 10 December 2025

Petra Anita Tóvizi (born 15 March 1999) is a Hungarian handballer for Debreceni VSC and the Hungary national team.

She debuted in the national team on 22 November 2018 against Norway.

She represented Hungary at four European Championship (2018, 2020, 2022, 2024) tournaments, and three World Championship (2019, 2021, 2023) tournaments. She also participated in the Paris Summer Olympics in 2024, where the team finished at 6th place. At the 2024 European Championship she was part of the Hungarian team that won bronze medals, losing to Norway in semifinal and beating France in the third place play-off. This was the first Hungarian medals since 2012.

== Achievements ==
- European Women's Handball Championship:
  - Bronze: 2024
- IHF Women's Junior World Championship:
  - Gold: 2018

== Personal life ==
She is a double major in physical education and history at the University of Debrecen. She was formerly known as Petra Füzi-Tóvizi.
