= Kitti Kudor =

Hungarian handball player (born 1988)

Personal information
- Full name: Kitti Kudor
- Nationality: Hungarian
- Born: 22 January 1988 (age 38) Debrecen, Hungary
- Height: 1.68 m (5 ft 6 in)

Sport
- Sport: Handball
- Position: Middle Back
- Current club: Retired

Senior clubs
- Years: Team
- 2004–2006: Debreceni VSC
- 2006–2008: Derecske KK
- 2008–2009: Nyíradony KK
- 2009–2010: Hódmezővásárhelyi NKC
- 2010–2011: Békéscsabai ENKSE
- 2011–2016: Debreceni VSC
- 2016–2017: Dunaújvárosi Kohász KA
- 2017–2018: Nyíradony VVTK

Kitti Kudor (born 22 January 1988 in Debrecen) is a retired Hungarian handballer. She retired from professional handball in 2018 and started to work as a coach at DVSC's U16 team, which plays in the 3rd division of the age category.

== Achievements ==
- EHF Cup:
  - Semifinalist: 2006
