= Hódos Imre Sports Hall =

Indoor arena in Debrecen, Hungary

- Hódos
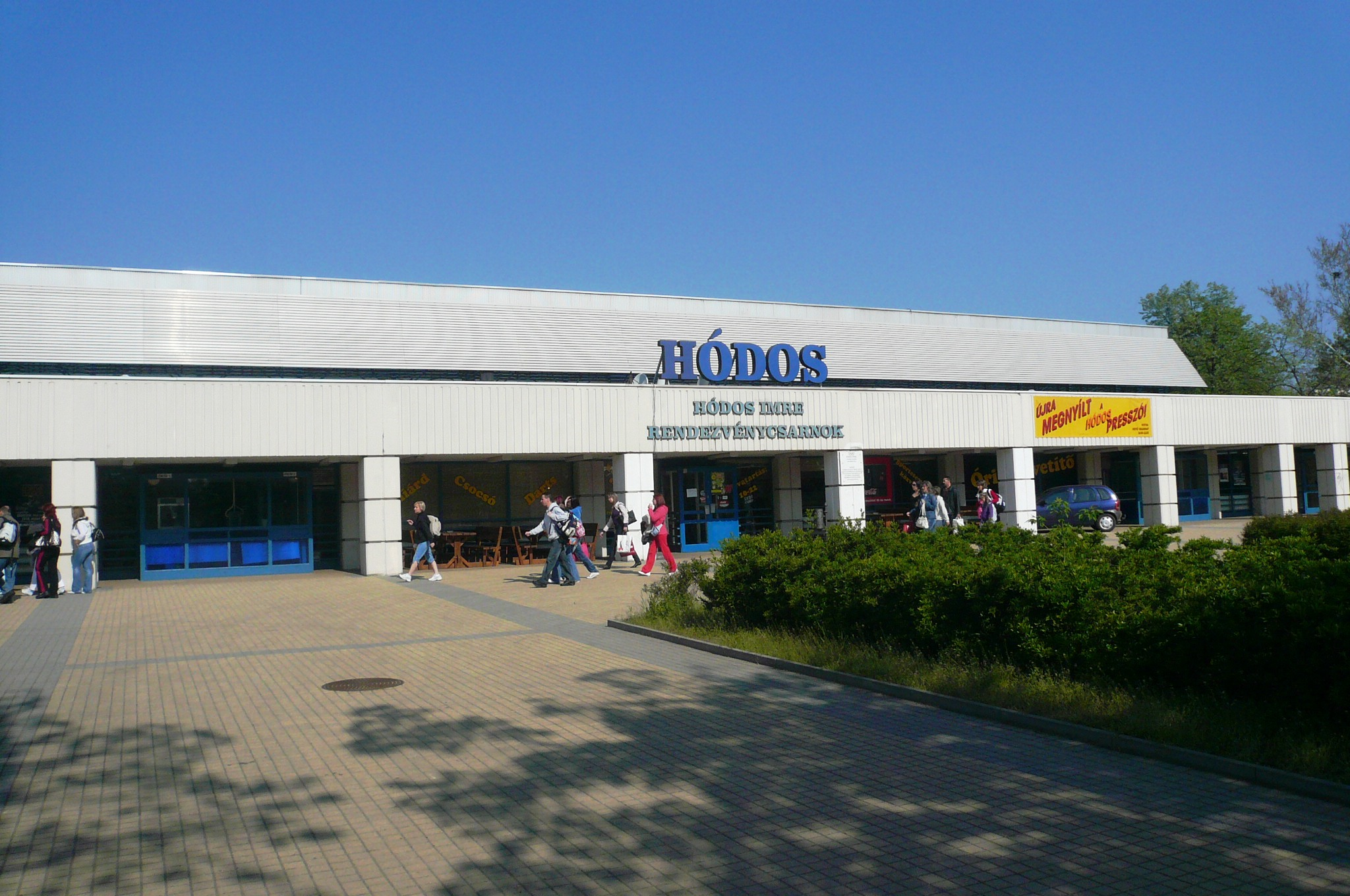
- Main entrance of Hódos Imre Sports Hall
- Interactive map of Hódos Imre Sports Hall
- Former names: Hódos Imre Rendezvénycsarnok
- Location: Debrecen, Hungary
- Coordinates: 47.546589°N 21.643361°E
- Capacity: 1,848 (handball)

Construction
- Opened: 1976
- Renovated: 2018
- Expanded: 2020

Tenant
- Debreceni VSC (Nemzeti Bajnokság I)

Hódos Imre Sports Hall is an indoor arena in Debrecen, Hungary. It is primarily used for handball. Besides sport events, it also hosts other type of events. It was inaugurated as an exhibition and sports hall in 1976. The hall was renovated in 2018–2020. The Hódos Imre Sports Hall is located only four kilometres away from the city centre with public transport stopping directly in front of it.

Hódos Imre Sports Hall has 1,848 seating places for handball events. For other events, such as concerts and shows, the figures can go up to 3,000, including standing places.

It is the home ground of the top-class handball club Debreceni VSC.

There are 80 parking spaces around the arena. However, there are 455 parking spaces in the adjacent Főnix Aréna parking lot, providing plenty of space for visitors arriving by car.

== Gallery ==
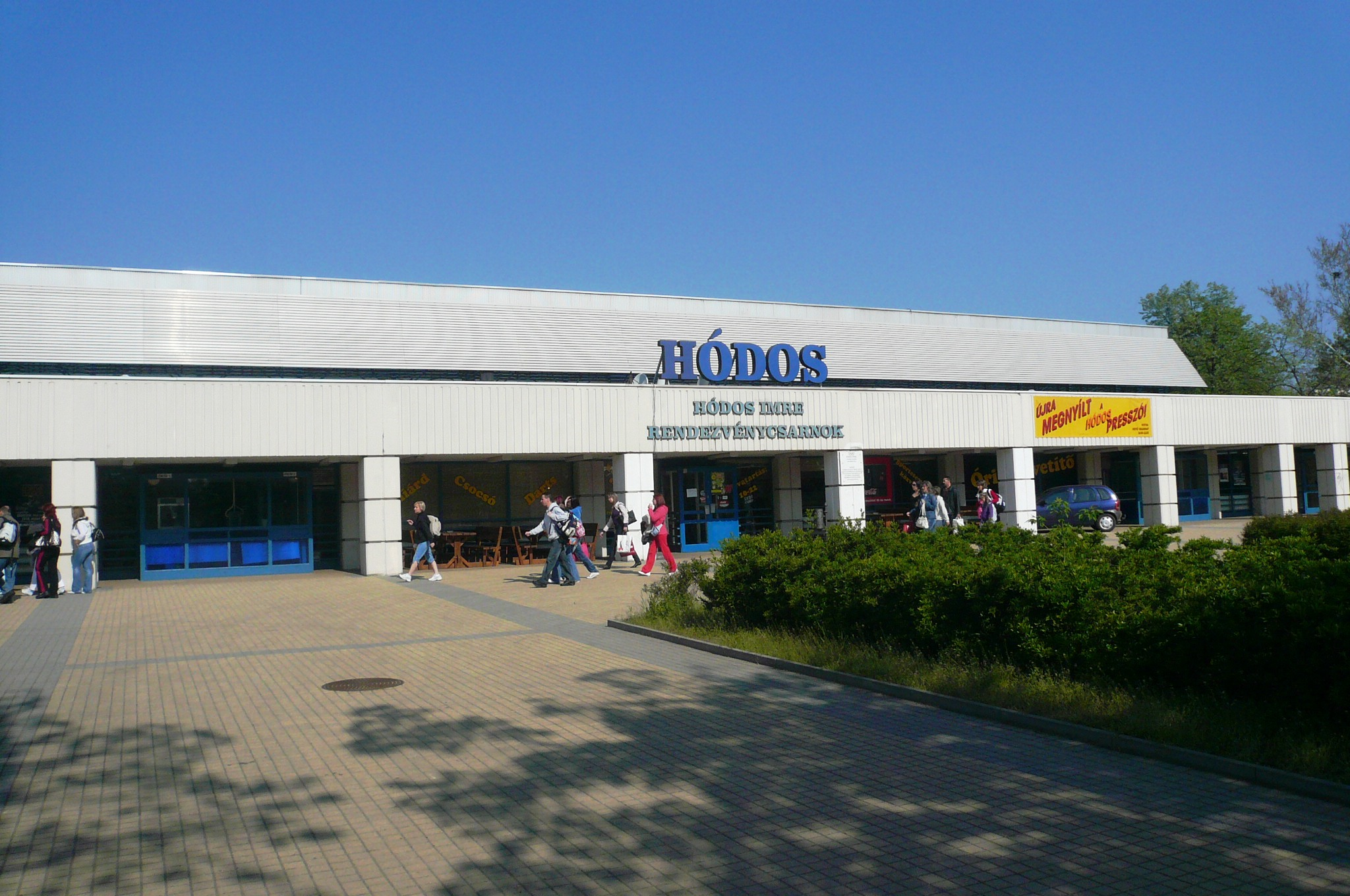

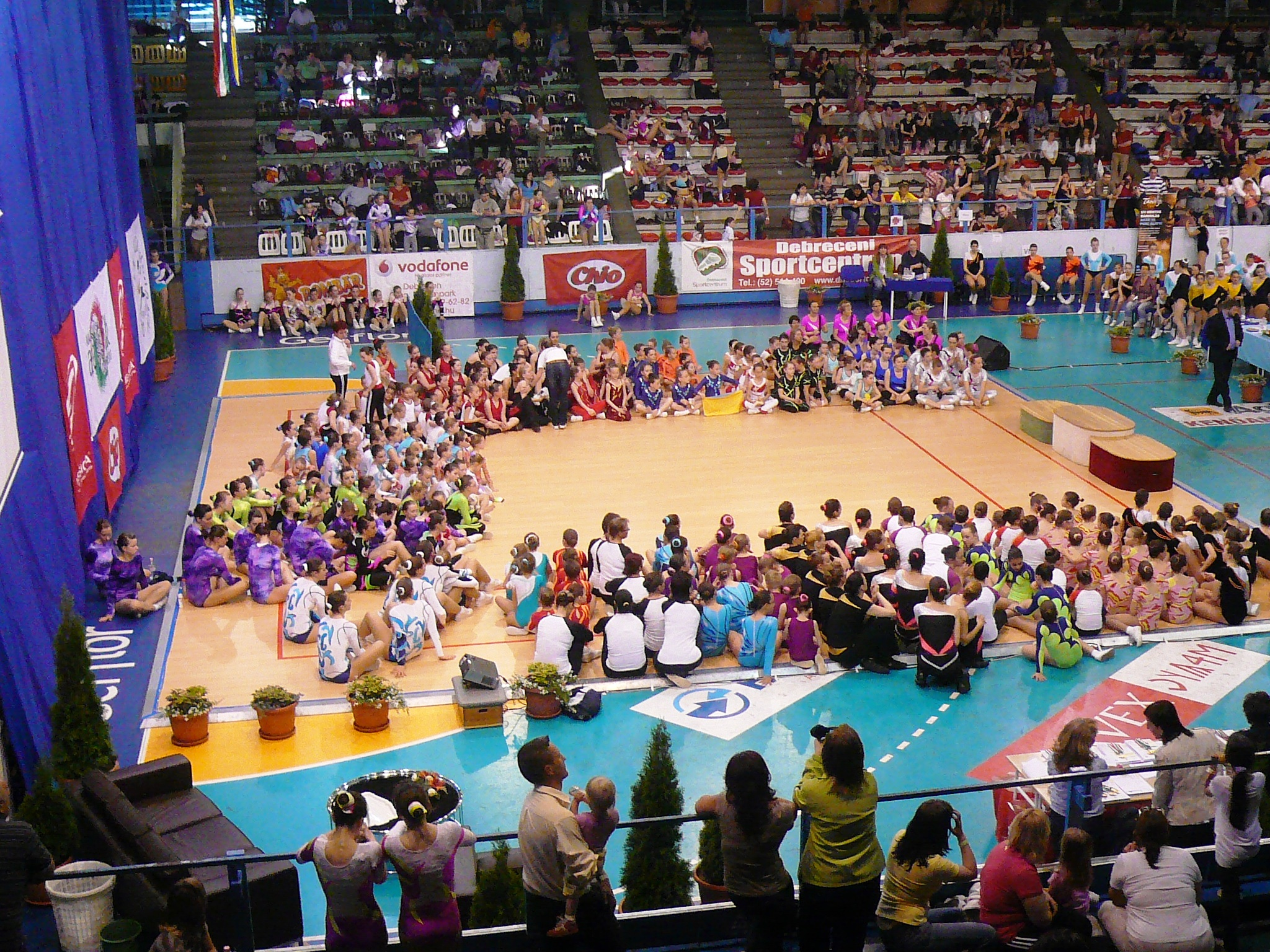

== See also ==
- List of indoor arenas in Hungary
