= 2024–25 Debreceni VSC (women's handball) season =

DVSC Schaeffler sports season

DVSC Schaeffler
2024–25 season
- President: (Hungary) Zsolt Ábrók
- Manager: (Hungary) Zoltán Szilágyi
- Stadium: Hódos Imre Sports Hall, Debrecen
- Nemzeti Bajnokság I: 4th
- Hungarian Cup: Quarter-final
- European League: Qualification Round 3
- Top goalscorer: League: Töpfner: 125; All: Töpfner: 139
- Biggest win: 17 goals, 39–22 vs Mosonmagyaróvár (H), NB I, R22, 26 Apr 2025
- Biggest defeat: 17 goals, 24–41 vs Ferencváros (A), NB I, R19, 29 Mar 2025
Home colours	Away colours
- All statistics correct as of 24 May 2025.

The 2024–25 season is Debreceni VSC's 45th competitive and consecutive season in the Nemzeti Bajnokság I and 76th year in existence as a handball club.

Since August 2018 they are sponsored by Schaeffler Group, so the official name for the team is DVSC Schaeffler.

== Kits ==
Supplier: Kappa / Sponsor: Schaeffler

Home	Away	Third

== Players ==
=== Squad information ===
Goalkeepers (GK)

- 12 (Sweden) Jessica Ryde
- 16 (Croatia) Gabrijela Bartulović (on loan to Dunaújváros (until 30 November 2024)
- 94 (France) Catherine Gabriel

Left wingers (LW)

- 24 (Hungary) Míra Vámos
- 71 (Hungary) Mirtill Petrus

Right wingers (RW)

- 18 (Hungary) Vivien Grosch
- 28 (Hungary) Alexandra Töpfner

Line players (LP)

- 9 (Hungary) Kata Juhász
- 13 (Hungary) Petra Füzi-Tóvizi
- 55 (Netherlands) Tamara Haggerty

Left backs (LB)

- 22 (Serbia) Jovana Jovović
- 29 (Sweden) Kristin Thorleifsdóttir
- 92 (Hungary) Dóra Hornyák

Centre backs (CB)

- 25 (Hungary) Liliána Csernyánszki
- 33 (Hungary) Nikolett Tóth
- 81 (Hungary) Nina Szabó
- 83 (Hungary) Dorina Kelemen

Right backs (RB)

- 5 (Hungary) Konszuéla Hámori (c)
- 6 (France) Océane Sercien-Ugolin
- 19 (Hungary) Rebeka Balogh

=== Transfers ===
==== 2024–25 season ====
Transfers for the 2024–25 season

Joining

- (Hungary) Nikolett Tóth (CB) (from (Hungary) Mosonmagyaróvári KC SE)
- (France) Océane Sercien-Ugolin (RB) (from (Norway) Vipers Kristiansand)
- (Sweden) Kristin Thorleifsdóttir (LB) (from (Denmark) HH Elite)
- (Austria) Kristina Dramac (RB) (from (Croatia) RK Lokomotiva Zagreb)
- (Sweden) Jessica Ryde (GK) (from (France) Neptunes de Nantes)
- (Hungary) Petra Keller (RW) (from (Hungary) Debreceni VSC Academy)

Leaving

- (Hungary) Petra Vámos (CB) (to (France) Metz Handball)
- (Hungary) Szimonetta Planéta (RB) (to (Poland) MKS Lublin)
- (Hungary) Gréta Kácsor (LB) (to (Romania) Gloria Bistrița)
- (Sweden) Elinore Johansson (RB) (to (Germany) TuS Metzingen)
- (Austria) Kristina Dramac (RB) (to (Croatia) Podravka Koprivnica)

==== 2025–26 season ====
Transfers for the 2025–26 season

Joining

- (France) Alicia Toublanc (RW) (from (Romania) Vâlcea)
- (Sweden) Daniela de Jong (CB) (from (Romania) Vâlcea)

Leaving

- (Netherlands) Tamara Haggerty (LP) End of contract
- (Hungary) Nikolett Tóth (CB) (to (Hungary) Vasas)
- (Hungary) Alexandra Töpfner (RW) (to (Romania) Rapid București)

=== Contract extension ===
- (Hungary) Mirtill Petrus (LW) until 30 June 2027
- (Hungary) Petra Füzi-Tóvizi (LP) until 30 June 2027
- (Serbia) Jovana Jovović (LB) until 30 June 2027
- (Hungary) Konszuéla Hámori (RB) until 30 June 2026
- (Hungary) Míra Vámos (LW) until 30 June 2027
- (Hungary) Vivien Grosch (RW) until 30 June 2026 or 2027
- (Hungary) Nina Szabó (CB) until 30 June 2027
- (Hungary) Dóra Hornyák (LB) until 30 June 2026

== Club ==
=== Technical Staff ===
Position	Staff member
President	(Hungary) Zsolt Ábrók
Technical manager	(Hungary) Marietta Vágó
Head coach	(Hungary) Zoltán Szilágyi
Assistant coach	(Hungary) Kitti Kudor
Goalkeeping coach	(Slovenia) Grega Karpan
Team doctor	(Hungary) Dr. Tamás Bazsó
Physiotherapist	(Hungary) Attila Kazsimér
Physiotherapist	(Hungary) Laura Kerék
Fitness coach	(Hungary) Örs Sebestyén
Video Analytics	(Hungary) Attila Kun

Source: Coaches, Management

=== Uniform ===
- Supplier: (Italy) Kappa
- Main sponsor: Shaeffler / tippmix / Tranzit-Food / City of Debrecen / Manz
- Back sponsor: Volkswagen / Globus / Cívis Ház
- Arm sponsor: BCB Higiénia / EHF
- Shorts sponsor: Miko Coffee / CTS Informatika / MySeyu / Team&Event / tippmix

== Friendlies matches ==
=== Pre-season ===
25 July 2024; 17:00	DVSC Schaeffler	33–32	Esztergom	Hódos Imre Sports Hall, Debrecen; Attendance: 150; Referees: Gy. Sándor, B. Szabó (HUN)
25 July 2024; 17:00	Grosch, N. Szabó 6	(18–19)	Faragó 12	Hódos Imre Sports Hall, Debrecen; Attendance: 150; Referees: Gy. Sándor, B. Szabó (HUN)
25 July 2024; 17:00		Report		Hódos Imre Sports Hall, Debrecen; Attendance: 150; Referees: Gy. Sándor, B. Szabó (HUN)

1 August 2024; 15:00	FTC-Rail Cargo Hungaria	30–28	DVSC Schaeffler	Elek Gyula Aréna, Budapest
1 August 2024; 15:00	Dmitrijeva 10	(20–15)	Sercien-Ugolin, N. Tóth 7	Elek Gyula Aréna, Budapest
1 August 2024; 15:00		Report		Elek Gyula Aréna, Budapest

8 August 2024; 16:00	DVSC Schaeffler	32–26	Békéscsaba	Hódos Imre Sports Hall, Debrecen
8 August 2024; 16:00	Töpfner 5	(14–15)	Lopes 8 (2)	Hódos Imre Sports Hall, Debrecen
8 August 2024; 16:00	1× (suspension)	Report	3× (suspension)	Hódos Imre Sports Hall, Debrecen

15 August 2024; 16:00	DVSC Schaeffler	C	Zalau (Romania)
15 August 2024; 16:00		Report

==== I. Kermann IT International tournament – Debrecen (HUN) ====
23 August 2024; 18:00	DVSC Schaeffler	23–25	(Norway) Vipers Kristiansand	Hódos Imre Sports Hall, Debrecen
23 August 2024; 18:00	Sercien-Ugolin, Thorleifsdóttir 5	(12–13)	Roberts 6	Hódos Imre Sports Hall, Debrecen
23 August 2024; 18:00	2× (suspension)	Report	5× (suspension)	Hódos Imre Sports Hall, Debrecen

24 August 2024; 18:00	DVSC Schaeffler	28–31	FTC-Rail Cargo Hungaria	Hódos Imre Sports Hall, Debrecen; Attendance: 1,500
24 August 2024; 18:00	Thorleifsdóttir 4	(13–15)	Klujber 8 (2)	Hódos Imre Sports Hall, Debrecen; Attendance: 1,500
24 August 2024; 18:00	2× (suspension)	Report	3× (suspension)	Hódos Imre Sports Hall, Debrecen; Attendance: 1,500

30 August 2024; 15:00	DVSC Schaeffler	28–23	(Croatia) Podravka Koprivnica	Hódos Imre Sports Hall, Debrecen
30 August 2024; 15:00	Grosch 5 (2), Töpfner 5 (2)	(12–14)	Pletikosić 6 (2)	Hódos Imre Sports Hall, Debrecen
30 August 2024; 15:00	3× (suspension)	Report	5× (suspension)	Hódos Imre Sports Hall, Debrecen

=== In-season ===
28 February 2025	MTK Budapest	29–41	DVSC Schaeffler	Riz Levente Sport- és Rendezvényközpont, Budapest
28 February 2025		(17–19)	Töpfner 9 (7)	Riz Levente Sport- és Rendezvényközpont, Budapest
28 February 2025		Report		Riz Levente Sport- és Rendezvényközpont, Budapest

== Competitions ==
=== Overall record ===
In italics, we indicate the Last match and the Final position achieved in competition(s) that have not yet been completed.

Competition	First match	Last match	Starting round	Final position	Record							
Competition	First match	Last match	Starting round	Final position	Pld	W	D	L	GF	GA	GD	Win %
Nemzeti Bajnokság I	7 Sep. 2024	24 May 2025	Matchday 1	4th	26	20	2	4	851	691	+160	76.92
Magyar Kupa	21 Dec. 2024	15 Jan. 2025	Fourth round	Quarter-final	2	1	0	1	61	53	+8	50.00
EHF European League	10 Nov. 2024	17 Nov. 2024	Qualification stage, Round 3	Qualification stage, Round 3	2	0	0	2	59	64	−5	0.00
Total					30	21	2	7	971	808	+163	70.00

Source: Competitions

=== Nemzeti Bajnokság I ===
==== League table ====
Pos	Team	Pld	W	D	L	GF	GA	GD	Pts	Qualification or relegation
1	Győri Audi ETO KC (C)	26	25	0	1	979	617	+362	50	Qualification for the Champions League group stage
2	FTC-Rail Cargo Hungaria	26	24	1	1	927	645	+282	49	Qualification for the Champions League group stage
3	MOL Esztergomi KC	26	21	0	5	808	741	+67	42 (Note: MOL Eszergomi KC finished ahead of DVSC Schaeffler on head-to-head goal difference: Esztergom 21–22 Debrecen, Debrecen 28–34 Esztergom.)	Qualification for the European League third qualifying round
4	DVSC Schaeffler	26	20	2	4	851	691	+160	42	Qualification for the Champions League group stage
5	Motherson Mosonmagyaróvári KC	26	12	2	12	749	792	−43	26	Qualification for the European League second qualifying round
6	Kisvárda Master Good SE	26	11	2	13	636	709	−73	24 (Note: Kisvárda Master Good SE finished ahead of Vác on head-to-head goal difference: Kisvárda 28–23 Vác, Vác 26–25 Kisvárda.)	
7	Vác	26	12	0	14	752	787	−35	24	
8	Szombathelyi KKA	26	9	5	12	738	814	−76	23	
9	Alba Fehérvár KC	26	8	1	17	713	767	−54	17	
10	Dunaújvárosi Kohász KA	26	7	2	17	771	865	−94	16 (Note: Dunaújvárosi Kohász KA finished ahead of Moyra-Budaörs Handball on head-to-head goal difference: Dunaújváros 39–25 Budaörs, Budaörs 33–28 Dunaújváros.)	
11	Tappe-Békéscsabai Előre NKSE	26	7	2	17	692	820	−128	16	
12	Vasas SC	26	6	2	18	711	845	−134	14	
13	MTK Budapest (R)	26	5	1	20	723	862	−139	11	Relegation to the Nemzeti Bajnokság I/B
14	Tappe-Békéscsabai Előre NKSE (R)	26	4	2	20	718	813	−95	10	Relegation to the Nemzeti Bajnokság I/B

Source: Hungarian Handball Federation (in Hungarian), Flashscore
Rules for classification: 1) Points; 2) Head-to-head points; 3) Head-to-head goal difference; 4) Goal difference; 5) Goals scored; 6) Matches won; 7) Draw (Note: Head-to-head record is used only after all the matches between the teams in question have been played)
(C) Champions; (R) Relegated

==== Results by round ====
Match	1	2	3	4	5	6	7	8	9	10	11	12	13	14	15	16	17	18	19	20	21	22	23	24	25	26
Ground	A	H	A	H	A	H	A	H	A	H	A	H	A	H	A	H	A	H	A	H	A	H	A	H	A	H
Result	W	L	W	W	L	D	W	D	W	W	W	W	W	W	W	W	W	L	L	W	W	W	W	W	W	W
Position	2	5	4	3	5	5	4	5	4	4	4	4	4	4	3	3	3	4	4	4	3	3	3	3	3	4
Points	2	2	4	6	6	7	9	10	12	14	16	18	20	22	24	26	28	28	28	30	32	34	36	38	40	42

Updated to match(es) played on 24 May 2025. Source: Matches
A = Away; H = Home; W = Win; D = Draw; L = Loss

==== Matches ====
Win Draw Loss Fixtures

Round 1; 7 September 2024; 18:00 CEST	Vasas	24–39	DVSC Schaeffler	Sterbinszky Amália Kézilabdacsarnok, Budapest; Attendance: 300; Referees: Ádám Héjja, Balázs Kónya
Round 1; 7 September 2024; 18:00 CEST	Szilovics 6, Farkas 6 (2)	(11–17)	Füzi-Tóvizi 7	Sterbinszky Amália Kézilabdacsarnok, Budapest; Attendance: 300; Referees: Ádám Héjja, Balázs Kónya
Round 1; 7 September 2024; 18:00 CEST	1× (yellow card) 1× (suspension)	Report	1× (yellow card) 5× (suspension)	Sterbinszky Amália Kézilabdacsarnok, Budapest; Attendance: 300; Referees: Ádám Héjja, Balázs Kónya

Round 2; 14 September 2024; 18:00 CEST	DVSC Schaeffler	28–34	MOL Esztergom	Hódos Imre Sports Hall, Debrecen; Attendance: 1,000; Referees: Gábor Kiu, Tamás Kiu
Round 2; 14 September 2024; 18:00 CEST	Töpfner 5 (2)	(13–18)	Faragó 13 (3)	Hódos Imre Sports Hall, Debrecen; Attendance: 1,000; Referees: Gábor Kiu, Tamás Kiu
Round 2; 14 September 2024; 18:00 CEST	4× (suspension)	Report	6× (suspension)	Hódos Imre Sports Hall, Debrecen; Attendance: 1,000; Referees: Gábor Kiu, Tamás Kiu

Round 3; 21 September 2024; 17:00 CEST	MTK	30–38	DVSC Schaeffler	Sterbinszky Amália Kézilabdacsarnok, Budapest; Attendance: 200; Referees: Dániel Paska, Sámuel Vastag
Round 3; 21 September 2024; 17:00 CEST	Kekezović 9	(10–18)	Sercien-Ugolin 6, M. Vámos 6	Sterbinszky Amália Kézilabdacsarnok, Budapest; Attendance: 200; Referees: Dániel Paska, Sámuel Vastag
Round 3; 21 September 2024; 17:00 CEST	1× (yellow card) 3× (suspension) 1× (red card)	Report	1× (yellow card) 4× (suspension)	Sterbinszky Amália Kézilabdacsarnok, Budapest; Attendance: 200; Referees: Dániel Paska, Sámuel Vastag

Round 4; 5 October 2024; 18:00 CEST	DVSC Schaeffler	32–20	Szombathely	Hódos Imre Sports Hall, Debrecen; Attendance: 1,000; Referees: Péter Horváth, Balázs Marton
Round 4; 5 October 2024; 18:00 CEST	Petrus 6	(17–12)	Pődör 10	Hódos Imre Sports Hall, Debrecen; Attendance: 1,000; Referees: Péter Horváth, Balázs Marton
Round 4; 5 October 2024; 18:00 CEST	5× (suspension)	Report	3× (suspension)	Hódos Imre Sports Hall, Debrecen; Attendance: 1,000; Referees: Péter Horváth, Balázs Marton

Round 5; 9 October 2024; 19:00 CEST	Győri Audi ETO KC	29–28	DVSC Schaeffler	Audi Aréna, Győr; Attendance: 2,217; Referees: Kristóf Altmár, Márton Horváth
Round 5; 9 October 2024; 19:00 CEST	de Paula 7	(17–13)	Petrus 7	Audi Aréna, Győr; Attendance: 2,217; Referees: Kristóf Altmár, Márton Horváth
Round 5; 9 October 2024; 19:00 CEST	1× (yellow card) 4× (suspension)	Report	4× (suspension)	Audi Aréna, Győr; Attendance: 2,217; Referees: Kristóf Altmár, Márton Horváth

Round 6; 16 October 2024; 18:00 CEST	DVSC Schaeffler	26–26	FTC-Rail Cargo Hungaria	Hódos Imre Sports Hall, Debrecen; Attendance: 1,600; Referees: Ferenc Felhő, Tamás Öcsi
Round 6; 16 October 2024; 18:00 CEST	Sercien-Ugolin 5	(12–13)	Bölk 9	Hódos Imre Sports Hall, Debrecen; Attendance: 1,600; Referees: Ferenc Felhő, Tamás Öcsi
Round 6; 16 October 2024; 18:00 CEST	1× (yellow card) 1× (suspension)	Report	2× (yellow card) 2× (suspension)	Hódos Imre Sports Hall, Debrecen; Attendance: 1,600; Referees: Ferenc Felhő, Tamás Öcsi

Round 7; 2 November 2024; 16:30 CET	Alba Fehérvár KC	27–32	DVSC Schaeffler	Köfém Sportcsarnok, Székesfehérvár; Attendance: 400; Referees: Gábor Kiu, Tamás Kiu
Round 7; 2 November 2024; 16:30 CET	Kövér 6	(16–17)	Sercien-Ugolin 8	Köfém Sportcsarnok, Székesfehérvár; Attendance: 400; Referees: Gábor Kiu, Tamás Kiu
Round 7; 2 November 2024; 16:30 CET	5× (suspension)	Report	1× (yellow card) 5× (suspension)	Köfém Sportcsarnok, Székesfehérvár; Attendance: 400; Referees: Gábor Kiu, Tamás Kiu

Round 8; 6 November 2024; 18:00 CET	DVSC Schaeffler	28–28	Moyra-Budaörs Handball	Hódos Imre Sports Hall, Debrecen; Attendance: 700; Referees: Ferenc Nagy, József Túróczy
Round 8; 6 November 2024; 18:00 CET	Thorleifsdóttir 7	(12–12)	Uhrin 8	Hódos Imre Sports Hall, Debrecen; Attendance: 700; Referees: Ferenc Nagy, József Túróczy
Round 8; 6 November 2024; 18:00 CET	1× (yellow card) 4× (suspension)	Report	1× (suspension)	Hódos Imre Sports Hall, Debrecen; Attendance: 700; Referees: Ferenc Nagy, József Túróczy

Round 9; 13 November 2024; 17:30 CET	Motherson Mosonmagyaróvár	29–31	DVSC Schaeffler	UFM Aréna, Mosonmagyaróvár; Attendance: 950; Referees: Miklós Andorka, Róbert Hucker
Round 9; 13 November 2024; 17:30 CET	E. Tóth 11	(15–18)	Jovović 6	UFM Aréna, Mosonmagyaróvár; Attendance: 950; Referees: Miklós Andorka, Róbert Hucker
Round 9; 13 November 2024; 17:30 CET	1× (yellow card) 3× (suspension)	Report	1× (yellow card) 6× (suspension)	UFM Aréna, Mosonmagyaróvár; Attendance: 950; Referees: Miklós Andorka, Róbert Hucker

Round 10; 29 December 2024; 18:00 CET	DVSC Schaeffler	42–23	Békéscsabai Előre NKSE	Hódos Imre Sports Hall, Debrecen; Attendance: 1,400; Referees: Tibor Kovács, Balázs Mándli
Round 10; 29 December 2024; 18:00 CET	Töpfner 10 (7)	(18–12)	Borbély 6 (1)	Hódos Imre Sports Hall, Debrecen; Attendance: 1,400; Referees: Tibor Kovács, Balázs Mándli
Round 10; 29 December 2024; 18:00 CET	1× (yellow card) 3× (suspension)	Report	3× (suspension)	Hódos Imre Sports Hall, Debrecen; Attendance: 1,400; Referees: Tibor Kovács, Balázs Mándli

Round 11; 4 January 2025; 18:00 CET	Dunaújvárosi Kohász KA	23–37	DVSC Schaeffler	Városi Sportcsarnok, Dunaújváros; Attendance: 275; Referees: Ádám Héjja, Balázs Kónya
Round 11; 4 January 2025; 18:00 CET	Kellermann 7 (2), Luchies 7 (2)	(10–16)	Töpfner 11 (4)	Városi Sportcsarnok, Dunaújváros; Attendance: 275; Referees: Ádám Héjja, Balázs Kónya
Round 11; 4 January 2025; 18:00 CET	3× (suspension) 1× (red card)	Report	4× (suspension)	Városi Sportcsarnok, Dunaújváros; Attendance: 275; Referees: Ádám Héjja, Balázs Kónya

Round 12; 11 January 2025; 18:00 CET	DVSC Schaeffler	35–23	Kisvárda Master Good SE	Hódos Imre Sports Hall, Debrecen; Attendance: 850; Referees: Bence Asztalos, Zoltán Szalay
Round 12; 11 January 2025; 18:00 CET	N. Tóth 6	(19–11)	Novak 5, Karnik 5 (1)	Hódos Imre Sports Hall, Debrecen; Attendance: 850; Referees: Bence Asztalos, Zoltán Szalay
Round 12; 11 January 2025; 18:00 CET	1× (yellow card) 5× (suspension)	Report	7× (suspension)	Hódos Imre Sports Hall, Debrecen; Attendance: 850; Referees: Bence Asztalos, Zoltán Szalay

Round 13; 25 January 2025; 18:00 CET	Vác	23–28	DVSC Schaeffler	Városi Sportcsarnok, Vác; Attendance: 600; Referees: Gábor Hargitai, Gábor Markó
Round 13; 25 January 2025; 18:00 CET	Juhász 4	(12–17)	Thorleifsdóttir 7	Városi Sportcsarnok, Vác; Attendance: 600; Referees: Gábor Hargitai, Gábor Markó
Round 13; 25 January 2025; 18:00 CET	1× (yellow card) 3× (suspension)	Report	1× (yellow card) 5× (suspension)	Városi Sportcsarnok, Vác; Attendance: 600; Referees: Gábor Hargitai, Gábor Markó

Round 14; 1 February 2025; 18:00 CET	DVSC Schaeffler	38–24	Vasas SC	Hódos Imre Sports Hall, Debrecen; Attendance: 1,400; Referees: Balázs Garai, Levente Varasdi
Round 14; 1 February 2025; 18:00 CET	Töpfner 10 (6)	(18–13)	Farkas 6 (3)	Hódos Imre Sports Hall, Debrecen; Attendance: 1,400; Referees: Balázs Garai, Levente Varasdi
Round 14; 1 February 2025; 18:00 CET	3× (suspension)	Report	3× (suspension)	Hódos Imre Sports Hall, Debrecen; Attendance: 1,400; Referees: Balázs Garai, Levente Varasdi

Round 15; 8 February 2025; 16:00 CET	MOL Esztergom	21–22	DVSC Schaeffler	Suzuki Aréna, Esztergom; Attendance: 634; Referees: Miklós Andorka, Róbert Hucker
Round 15; 8 February 2025; 16:00 CET	Faragó 7	(12–9)	Sercien-Ugolin, Thorleifsdóttir 5	Suzuki Aréna, Esztergom; Attendance: 634; Referees: Miklós Andorka, Róbert Hucker
Round 15; 8 February 2025; 16:00 CET	3× (suspension)	Report	2× (yellow card) 2× (suspension)	Suzuki Aréna, Esztergom; Attendance: 634; Referees: Miklós Andorka, Róbert Hucker

Round 16; 22 February 2025; 18:00 CET	DVSC Schaeffler	43–33	MTK	Hódos Imre Sports Hall, Debrecen; Attendance: 800; Referees: Gábor Kiu, Tamás Kiu
Round 16; 22 February 2025; 18:00 CET	Füzi-Tóvizi 7	(23–19)	Kekezović 8	Hódos Imre Sports Hall, Debrecen; Attendance: 800; Referees: Gábor Kiu, Tamás Kiu
Round 16; 22 February 2025; 18:00 CET	1× (yellow card) 3× (suspension)	Report	1× (yellow card) 2× (suspension) 1× (red card)	Hódos Imre Sports Hall, Debrecen; Attendance: 800; Referees: Gábor Kiu, Tamás Kiu

Round 17; 16 March 2025; 18:00 CET	Szombathely	26–27	DVSC Schaeffler	Haladás Sportkomplexum, Szombathely; Attendance: 510; Referees: Ferenc Felhő, Tamás Öcsi
Round 17; 16 March 2025; 18:00 CET	Pődör 16	(17–14)	four players 4	Haladás Sportkomplexum, Szombathely; Attendance: 510; Referees: Ferenc Felhő, Tamás Öcsi
Round 17; 16 March 2025; 18:00 CET	1× (yellow card) 5× (suspension)	Report	1× (yellow card) 3× (suspension)	Haladás Sportkomplexum, Szombathely; Attendance: 510; Referees: Ferenc Felhő, Tamás Öcsi

Round 18; 22 March 2025; 18:00 CET	DVSC Schaeffler	28–36	Győri Audi ETO	Hódos Imre Sports Hall, Debrecen; Attendance: 2,100; Referees: László Bócz, Viktor Wiedemann
Round 18; 22 March 2025; 18:00 CET	Thorleifsdóttir 8	(16–12)	de Paula 8	Hódos Imre Sports Hall, Debrecen; Attendance: 2,100; Referees: László Bócz, Viktor Wiedemann
Round 18; 22 March 2025; 18:00 CET	2× (suspension)	Report	4× (suspension)	Hódos Imre Sports Hall, Debrecen; Attendance: 2,100; Referees: László Bócz, Viktor Wiedemann

Round 19; 29 March 2025; 17:15 CET	FTC-Rail Cargo Hungaria	41–24	DVSC Schaeffler	Elek Gyula Aréna, Budapest; Attendance: 1,200; Referees: Kristóf Altmár, Márton Horváth
Round 19; 29 March 2025; 17:15 CET	Cvijić 9	(17–12)	Töpfner 7 (5)	Elek Gyula Aréna, Budapest; Attendance: 1,200; Referees: Kristóf Altmár, Márton Horváth
Round 19; 29 March 2025; 17:15 CET	2× (suspension)	Report	4× (suspension)	Elek Gyula Aréna, Budapest; Attendance: 1,200; Referees: Kristóf Altmár, Márton Horváth

Round 20; 5 April 2025; 18:00 CEST	DVSC Schaeffler	34–28	Alba Fehérvár KC	Hódos Imre Sports Hall, Debrecen; Attendance: 800; Referees: Zsófia Hársfalvi, Réka Mórocz
Round 20; 5 April 2025; 18:00 CEST	Jovović 10 (5)	(14–16)	K. Szabó 9 (5)	Hódos Imre Sports Hall, Debrecen; Attendance: 800; Referees: Zsófia Hársfalvi, Réka Mórocz
Round 20; 5 April 2025; 18:00 CEST	1× (yellow card) 2× (suspension)	Report	1× (yellow card) 4× (suspension)	Hódos Imre Sports Hall, Debrecen; Attendance: 800; Referees: Zsófia Hársfalvi, Réka Mórocz

Round 21; 19 April 2025; 17:00 CEST	Moyra-Budaörs Handball	23–36	DVSC Schaeffler	Városi Sportcsarnok, Budapest; Attendance: 150; Referees: Tamás Fekete, Tamás Hajdu
Round 21; 19 April 2025; 17:00 CEST	Helm, Uhrin 4	(11–17)	M. Vámos, Töpfner 6	Városi Sportcsarnok, Budapest; Attendance: 150; Referees: Tamás Fekete, Tamás Hajdu
Round 21; 19 April 2025; 17:00 CEST	2× (suspension)	Report	2× (suspension)	Városi Sportcsarnok, Budapest; Attendance: 150; Referees: Tamás Fekete, Tamás Hajdu

Round 22; 26 April 2025; 16:30 CEST	DVSC Schaeffler	39–22	Motherson-Mosonmagyaróvár	Hódos Imre Sports Hall, Debrecen; Attendance: 1,150; Referees: Gábor Hargitai, Gábor Markó
Round 22; 26 April 2025; 16:30 CEST	Töpfner 8 (3)	(17–10)	Albek 5	Hódos Imre Sports Hall, Debrecen; Attendance: 1,150; Referees: Gábor Hargitai, Gábor Markó
Round 22; 26 April 2025; 16:30 CEST	1× (yellow card) 5× (suspension)	Report	1× (yellow card) 3× (suspension)	Hódos Imre Sports Hall, Debrecen; Attendance: 1,150; Referees: Gábor Hargitai, Gábor Markó

Round 23; 3 May 2025; 18:00 CEST	TAPPE-Békéscsabai Előre NKSE	25–34	DVSC Schaeffler	Városi Sportcsarnok, Békéscsaba; Attendance: 800; Referees: Dániel Paska, Sámuel Vastag
Round 23; 3 May 2025; 18:00 CEST	Borbély 7 (4)	(15–18)	Töpfner 8 (5)	Városi Sportcsarnok, Békéscsaba; Attendance: 800; Referees: Dániel Paska, Sámuel Vastag
Round 23; 3 May 2025; 18:00 CEST	3× (suspension)	Report	4× (suspension)	Városi Sportcsarnok, Békéscsaba; Attendance: 800; Referees: Dániel Paska, Sámuel Vastag

Round 24; 10 May 2025; 18:00 CEST	DVSC Schaeffler	36–25	Dunaújvárosi Kohász KA	Hódos Imre Sports Hall, Debrecen; Attendance: 950; Referees: Bence Bátori, Boldizsár Szécsi Lantos
Round 24; 10 May 2025; 18:00 CEST	Csernyánszki 8	(17–14)	Kellermann 6	Hódos Imre Sports Hall, Debrecen; Attendance: 950; Referees: Bence Bátori, Boldizsár Szécsi Lantos
Round 24; 10 May 2025; 18:00 CEST	1× (yellow card) 4× (suspension)	Report	6× (suspension) 1× (red card)	Hódos Imre Sports Hall, Debrecen; Attendance: 950; Referees: Bence Bátori, Boldizsár Szécsi Lantos

Round 25; 17 May 2025; 18:00 CEST	Kisvárda Master Good SE	20–30	DVSC Schaeffler	Halasy Gyula Városi Sportcsarnok, Kisvárda; Attendance: 550; Referees: Gábor Kiu, Tamás Kiu
Round 25; 17 May 2025; 18:00 CEST	Bucsi 8 (4)	(11–14)	Sercien-Ugolin 7	Halasy Gyula Városi Sportcsarnok, Kisvárda; Attendance: 550; Referees: Gábor Kiu, Tamás Kiu
Round 25; 17 May 2025; 18:00 CEST	1× (yellow card) 2× (suspension)	Report	1× (yellow card) 1× (suspension)	Halasy Gyula Városi Sportcsarnok, Kisvárda; Attendance: 550; Referees: Gábor Kiu, Tamás Kiu

Round 26; 24 May 2025; 17:45 CEST	DVSC Schaeffler	36–28	Vác	Hódos Imre Sports Hall, Debrecen; Attendance: 1,050; Referees: László Bócz, Viktor Wiedemann
Round 26; 24 May 2025; 17:45 CEST	Töpfner 9 (3)	(17–13)	Csíkos 6 (1)	Hódos Imre Sports Hall, Debrecen; Attendance: 1,050; Referees: László Bócz, Viktor Wiedemann
Round 26; 24 May 2025; 17:45 CEST	2× (suspension) 1× (red card)	Report	1× (suspension)	Hódos Imre Sports Hall, Debrecen; Attendance: 1,050; Referees: László Bócz, Viktor Wiedemann

==== Results overview ====
All results are indicated from the perspective of DVSC Schaeffler.
We indicate in parentheses the number of round.
Win Draw Loss Postponed

Opposition	Home score	Away score	Aggregate score	Double
Alba Fehérvár KC	34–28 (20)	32–27 (7)	66–55	Yes
Eubility Group Békéscsabai Előre NKSE	42–23 (10)	34–25 (23)	76–48	Yes
Moyra-Budaörs Handball	28–28 (8)	36–23 (21)	64–51	No
Dunaújvárosi Kohász KA	36–25 (24)	37–23 (11)	73–48	Yes
MOL Esztergom	28–34 (2)	22–21 (15)	50–55	No
FTC-Rail Cargo Hungaria	26–26 (6)	24–41 (19)	50–67	No
Győri ETO KC	28–36 (18)	28–29 (5)	56–65	No
Kisvárda Master Good SE	35–23 (12)	30–20 (25)	65–53	Yes
Motherson-Mosonmagyaróvár	39–22 (22)	31–29 (9)	70–51	Yes
MTK Budapest	43–33 (16)	38–30 (3)	81–63	Yes
Szombathely	32–20 (4)	27–26 (17)	59–46	Yes
Vasas SC	38–24 (14)	39–24 (1)	77–48	Yes
Praktiker-Vác	36–28 (26)	28–23 (13)	64–51	Yes

=== Hungarian Cup ===
==== Fourth round ====
22 December 2024; 14:00 CET	MTK Budapest (1)	23–34	DVSC Schaeffler	Városi Uszoda Sportcsarnok és Strand, Budaörs; Attendance: 275; Referees: Kovács-Sebők, Vastag-Réti (HUN)
22 December 2024; 14:00 CET	Dávid-Azari, Bujdosó-Gerháth 5	(10–20)	Petrus 8	Városi Uszoda Sportcsarnok és Strand, Budaörs; Attendance: 275; Referees: Kovács-Sebők, Vastag-Réti (HUN)
22 December 2024; 14:00 CET	2× (suspension)	Report	1× (suspension)	Városi Uszoda Sportcsarnok és Strand, Budaörs; Attendance: 275; Referees: Kovács-Sebők, Vastag-Réti (HUN)

==== Quarter-final ====
15 January 2025; 18:00 CET	Motherson Mosonmagyaróvár	30–27	DVSC Schaeffler	UFM Aréna, Mosonmagyaróvár; Attendance: 700; Referees: Ferenc Nagy, József Túróczy (HUN)
15 January 2025; 18:00 CET	Varga 10	(15–16)	Jovović 8	UFM Aréna, Mosonmagyaróvár; Attendance: 700; Referees: Ferenc Nagy, József Túróczy (HUN)
15 January 2025; 18:00 CET	1× (yellow card) 4× (suspension)	Report	1× (yellow card) 8× (suspension)	UFM Aréna, Mosonmagyaróvár; Attendance: 700; Referees: Ferenc Nagy, József Túróczy (HUN)

=== EHF European League ===
Win Draw Loss Postponed

==== Qualification stage – Round 3 ====
===== Matches =====
10 November 2024; 17:00 (18:00 EET)	(Romania) SCM Râmnicu Vâlcea	33–31	DVSC Schaeffler	Traian Sports Hall, Râmnicu Vâlcea; Attendance: 1,500; Referees: Barbora Bocakova, Lucia Janosikova (SVK)
10 November 2024; 17:00 (18:00 EET)	Hagman 6	(20–15)	Sercien-Ugolin 8	Traian Sports Hall, Râmnicu Vâlcea; Attendance: 1,500; Referees: Barbora Bocakova, Lucia Janosikova (SVK)
10 November 2024; 17:00 (18:00 EET)	1× (yellow card) 4× (suspension)	Report	2× (yellow card) 2× (suspension)	Traian Sports Hall, Râmnicu Vâlcea; Attendance: 1,500; Referees: Barbora Bocakova, Lucia Janosikova (SVK)

17 November 2024; 18:00 CET	DVSC Schaeffler	28–31	(Romania) SCM Râmnicu Vâlcea	Hódos Imre Sports Hall, Debrecen; Attendance: 2,000; Referees: Malgorzata Lidacka, Urszula Lesiak (POL)
17 November 2024; 18:00 CET	Sercien-Ugolin 9	(15–15)	Wollik 7	Hódos Imre Sports Hall, Debrecen; Attendance: 2,000; Referees: Malgorzata Lidacka, Urszula Lesiak (POL)
17 November 2024; 18:00 CET	1× (yellow card) 3× (suspension)	Report	5× (suspension)	Hódos Imre Sports Hall, Debrecen; Attendance: 2,000; Referees: Malgorzata Lidacka, Urszula Lesiak (POL)

== Statistics ==
As of match played 24 May 2025

Keys
Rk.	Rank	No.	Squad number	Pos.	Position
Opponent	The opponent team without a flag is Hungarian.			(N)	The game was played at a neutral site.
(H)	DVSC Schaeffler were the home team.			(A)	DVSC Schaeffler were the away team.
Player^{*}	Player who joined DVSC Schaeffler permanently or on loan during the season				
Player^{†}	Player who departed DVSC Schaeffler permanently or on loan during the season				

=== Appearances ===
Includes all competitions for senior teams.
We indicate the number of the player's appearances as substitute by the combination of a plus sign and a figure.
We indicate with gold color the maximum appearances only in the competition in which the team has already played at least 2 matches.

No.	Pos.	Nat.	Player	Nemzeti Bajnokság I	Hungarian Cup	EHF European League	Season total	Ref.
Goalkeepers (GK)
12	GK	(Sweden)	Jessica Ryde	7+16	0+2	1+1	8+19	
16	GK	(Croatia)	Gabrijela Bartulović (On loan)	1+1	0	0	1+1	
45	GK	(Hungary)	Réka Lakatos	0+1	0	0	0+1	
94	GK	(France)	Catherine Gabriel	18+7	2	1+1	21+8	
Left wingers (LW)
24	LW	(Hungary)	Míra Vámos	3+14	0	0+1	3+15	
71	LW	(Hungary)	Mirtill Petrus	22+1	2	2	26+1	
Left backs (LB)
22	LB	(Croatia)	Jovana Jovović	19+6	2	2	23+6	
29	LB	(Sweden)	Kristin Thorleifsdóttir	20+5	1+1	0+2	21+8	
92	LB	(Hungary)	Dóra Hornyák	1+24	0+2	0+2	1+28	
Centre backs (CB)
25	CB	(Hungary)	Liliána Csernyánszki	6+15	1+1	2	9+16	
33	CB	(Hungary)	Nikolett Tóth	4+19	0+2	0+2	4+23	
81	CB	(Hungary)	Nina Szabó	3+2	0	0	3+2	
83	CB	(Hungary)	Dorina Kelemen	0+3	0+1	0	0+4	
Line players (LP)
9	LP	(Hungary)	Kata Juhász	0+13	0+1	0	0+14	
13	LP	(Hungary)	Petra Füzi-Tóvizi	22+4	1	2	25+4	
55	LP	(Netherlands)	Tamara Haggerty	4+22	1+1	0+1	5+24	
Right backs (RB)
5	RB	(Hungary)	Konszuéla Hámori (c)	8+9	0+2	0	8+11	
6	RB	(France)	Océane Sercien-Ugolin	18+8	2	2	22+8	
19	RB	(Hungary)	Rebeka Balogh	0+1	0	0	0+1	
Right wingers (RW)
18	RW	(Hungary)	Vivien Grosch	11+13	2	2	15+13	
28	RW	(Hungary)	Alexandra Töpfner	15+10	0+2	0+1	15+13	
31	RW	(Hungary)	Csenge Kiss	0+2	0	0	0+2	
Players who left the club during the season
(32)	RB	(Austria)	Kristina Dramac^{†} (On loan)	0+7	0	0+2	0+9	

=== Goal scorers ===
Includes all competitions for senior teams. The list is sorted by squad number when season-total goals are equal.

Rank	No.	Pos.	Nat.	Player	Nemzeti Bajnokság I	Hungarian Cup	EHF European League	Season total	Ref.
1	28	RW	(Hungary)	Alexandra Töpfner	125 (73)	10 (7)	2 (2)	139 (82)	
2	6	RB	(France)	Océane Sercien-Ugolin	96 (7)	6 (1)	17 (8)	119 (16)	
3	29	LB	(Sweden)	Kristin Thorleifsdóttir	93	7	3	103	
4	22	LB	(Croatia)	Jovana Jovović	85 (7)	8 (1)	9	102 (8)	
5	14	LP	(Hungary)	Petra Füzi-Tóvizi	77	3	4	84	
6	71	LW	(Hungary)	Mirtill Petrus	61	10	4	75	
7	25	CB	(Hungary)	Liliána Csernyanszki	61 (7)	6	5	72 (7)	
8	24	LW	(Hungary)	Míra Vámos	47	0	2	49	
8	5	RB	(Hungary)	Konszuéla Hámori (c)	48	1	0	49	
10	18	RW	(Hungary)	Vivien Grosch	39	4	2	45	
11	33	CB	(Hungary)	Nikolett Tóth	30	0	3	33	
12	55	LP	(Netherlands)	Tamara Haggerty	30	2	0	32	
13	81	CB	(Hungary)	Nina Szabó	15 (1)	0	0	15 (1)	
14	92	LB	(Hungary)	Dóra Hornyák	13 (6)	0	0	13 (6)	
15	(32)	RB	(Austria)	Kristina Dramac^{†}	9	0	3	12	
16	10	LP	(Hungary)	Kata Juhász	7	2	0	9	
17	83	CB	(Hungary)	Dorina Kelemen	2	1	0	3	
18	31	RW	(Hungary)	Csenge Kiss	2	0	0	2	
19	19	RB	(Hungary)	Rebeka Balogh	1	0	0	1	
20	12	GK	(Sweden)	Jessica Ryde	0	0	0	0	
20	16	GK	(Croatia)	Gabrijela Bartulović	0	0	0	0	
20	94	GK	(France)	Catherine Gabriel	0	0	0	0	
Total					851 (101)	61 (9)	59 (10)	971 (120)	

GK: Goalkeepers; LW: Left wingers; LB: Left backs; CB: Centre backs; LP: Line players; RB: Right backs; RW: Right wingers;

=== Attendances from season to season ===
Includes all competitive matches.
Last updated on 24 May 2025

Season	Hungarian League				Hungarian Cup				European League				Total			
Season	Total	M.	Avg.	%	Total	M.	Avg.	%	Total	M.	Avg.	%	Total	M.	Avg.	%
2024–25	14,800	13	1,138	+11%	—	—	—	—	2,000 (Note: EHF European League)	1	2,000	+6%	16,800	14	1,200	-11%
2023–24	13,270	13	1,021	-17%	0	0	0	—	15,000 (Note: EHF Champions League)	8	1,875	-3%	28,270	21	1,346	+2%
2022–23	16,000	13	1,231	+11%	2,000	2	1,000	-44%	5,800	3	1,933	+7%	23,800	18	1,322	+10%
2021–22	14,400	13	1,108	—	1,800	1	1,800	—	1,800	1	1,800	—	18,000	15	1,200	—
