= 2026–27 Debreceni VSC (women's handball) season =

DVSC Skyline sports season

DVSC Skyline
2026–27 season
- President: (Hungary) Zsolt Ábrók
- Manager: (Hungary) Zoltán Szilágyi
- Stadium: Hódos Imre Sports Hall, Debrecen
- Nemzeti Bajnokság I: 3rd
- Hungarian Cup: Quarter-final
- European League: Group phase
- Top goalscorer: League: Ivančok-Šoltić and Kobylińska (62 goals each); All: Ivančok-Šoltić and Kobylińska (62 goals each)
Home colours	Away colours
- All statistics correct as of 20 November 2026.

The 2026–27 season is Debreceni VSC's 47th competitive and consecutive season in the Nemzeti Bajnokság I and 78th year in existence as a handball club. In addition to the domestic league, DVSC participated in this season's editions of the Magyar Kupa (domestic cup).

Since June 2026 they are sponsored by Skyline Tickets, so the official name for the team is DVSC Skyline.

== Kits ==
Supplier: Kappa / TBD

Home	Away	Third	Goalkeeper

== Players ==
=== Squad information ===
Injured player

Goalkeepers (GK)

- 12 (Sweden) Jessica Ryde
- 85 (Hungary) Gréta Majoros
- 93 (Poland) Adrianna Płaczek

Left wingers (LW)

- 24 (Hungary) Míra Vámos
- 71 (Hungary) Mirtill Petrus

Right wingers (RW)

- 3 (France) Alicia Toublanc
- 10 (Hungary) Petra Keller
- 11 (Hungary) Flóra Magyar
- 26 (Hungary) Luca Ratalics

Line players (LP)

- 9 (Hungary) Kata Juhász
- 13 (Hungary) Petra Füzi-Tóvizi (captain)

Left backs (LB)

- 14 (Austria) Ines Ivančok-Šoltić
- 22 (Serbia) Jovana Jovović
- 29 (Sweden) Kristin Thorleifsdóttir

Centre backs (CB)

- 25 (Hungary) Liliána Csernyánszki
- 37 (Hungary) Dorottya Baranyi
- 81 (Hungary) Nina Szabó

Right backs (RB)

- 5 (Hungary) Konszuéla Hámori
- 8 (Poland) Monika Kobylinska

=== Transfers ===
==== 2026–27 season ====
Transfers for the 2026–27 season

Joining

- (Poland) Monika Kobylinska (RW) (from (Romania) Gloria Bistrița)
- (Hungary) Luca Ratalics (RW) (from DVSC Academy)
- (Hungary) Dorottya Baranyi (CB) (from DVSC Academy)
- (Hungary) Gréta Majoros (GK) (from DVSC Academy)
- (Hungary) Petra Keller (RW) (from DVSC Academy)

Leaving

- (Hungary) Vivien Grosch (RW) (to (Romania) CSM Târgu Mureș)
- (France) Océane Sercien-Ugolin (RB) (to (Romania) CS Rapid București)
- (Sweden) Daniela de Jong (CB) TBD
- (Hungary) Dóra Hornyák (LB) Retired

==== 2027–28 season ====
Transfers for the 2027–28 season

Joining

Leaving

- (France) Alicia Toublanc (RW) (to (France) Brest Bretagne)

=== Contract renewals ===
- (Hungary) Petra Füzi-Tóvizi (LP) until 30 June 2029
- (Austria) Ines Ivančok-Šoltić (LB) until 30 June 2030
- (Serbia) Jovana Jovović (LB) until 30 June 2029

== Club ==
=== Technical Staff ===
Position	Staff member
President	(Hungary) Zsolt Ábrók
Technical manager	(Hungary) Marietta Vágó
Head coach	(Hungary) Zoltán Szilágyi
Assistant coach	(Hungary) Kitti Kudor
Goalkeeping coach	(Slovenia) Grega Karpan
Team doctor	(Hungary) Dr. Tamás Bazsó
Physiotherapist	(Hungary) Attila Kazsimér
Physiotherapist	(Hungary) Laura Kerék
Fitness coach	(Hungary) Örs Sebestyén
Video Analytics	(Hungary) Attila Kun

Source: Coaches, Management

=== Uniform ===
- Supplier: (Italy) Kappa
- Main sponsor: Skyline / tippmix / Tranzit-Food / City of Debrecen / Manz
- Back sponsor: Volkswagen / Globus / Cívis Ház
- Arm sponsor: BCB Higiénia / EHF
- Shorts sponsor: Miko Coffee / CTS Informatika / MySeyu / Team&Event / tippmix

== Friendlies matches ==
=== Pre-season ===
DVSC Skyline began the preparation for the 2026/27 season at 13 July, 2026.

31 July 2026; 17:00	DVSC Skyline	34–32	(Romania) Slatina	Hódos Imre Sports Hall, Debrecen
31 July 2026; 17:00	Toublanc-Nicolas 6 (2)	(18–15)		Hódos Imre Sports Hall, Debrecen
31 July 2026; 17:00		Report		Hódos Imre Sports Hall, Debrecen

4 August 2026; 17:00	DVSC Skyline	30–25	(Romania) Slatina	Hódos Imre Sports Hall, Debrecen
4 August 2026; 17:00	Toublanc-Nicolas 6 (2)	(18–10)		Hódos Imre Sports Hall, Debrecen
4 August 2026; 17:00		Report		Hódos Imre Sports Hall, Debrecen

7 August 2026; 15:30	FTC-Toyota Kovács (Hungary)	28–31	DVSC Skyline	Elek Gyula Aréna, Budapest; Attendance: 600
7 August 2026; 15:30	P. Simon 6 (3)	(12–15)	Toublanc-Nicolas 10 (4)	Elek Gyula Aréna, Budapest; Attendance: 600
7 August 2026; 15:30	1× (suspension)	Report	2× (suspension)	Elek Gyula Aréna, Budapest; Attendance: 600

==== Memorialul Constantin Tită tournament – Râmnicu Vâlcea (ROU) ====
Semi-final

14 August 2026; TBD	Râmnicu Vâlcea (Romania)	28–25	DVSC Skyline	Traian Sports Hall, Râmnicu Vâlcea (Romania); Attendance: 600
14 August 2026; TBD		(16–15)	Toublanc-Nicolas 5 (1) and Ivancok-Soltic 5 (1)	Traian Sports Hall, Râmnicu Vâlcea (Romania); Attendance: 600
14 August 2026; TBD		Report		Traian Sports Hall, Râmnicu Vâlcea (Romania); Attendance: 600

Bronze match

15 August 2026	Krim Ljubljana (Slovenia)	29–40	DVSC Skyline	Traian Sports Hall, Râmnicu Vâlcea (Romania); Attendance: 1,000
15 August 2026		(16–18)	Kobylisnska 8 (1)	Traian Sports Hall, Râmnicu Vâlcea (Romania); Attendance: 1,000
15 August 2026		Report		Traian Sports Hall, Râmnicu Vâlcea (Romania); Attendance: 1,000

==== 3rd Kermann IT International tournament – Debrecen (HUN) ====
Participating teams: (Hungary) DVSC Skyline, (Croatia) Podravka Koprivnica, (Serbia) Crvena zvezda and (Hungary) Győri Audi ETO.

Semi-final

21 August 2026; 18:00	DVSC Skyline	32–29	(Croatia) Podravka	Hódos Imre Sports Hall, Debrecen; Attendance: 800; Referees: Gy. Sándor, B. Szabó (HUN)
21 August 2026; 18:00	Toublanc-Nicolas 8 (4)	(13–16)		Hódos Imre Sports Hall, Debrecen; Attendance: 800; Referees: Gy. Sándor, B. Szabó (HUN)
21 August 2026; 18:00		Report		Hódos Imre Sports Hall, Debrecen; Attendance: 800; Referees: Gy. Sándor, B. Szabó (HUN)

Final

22 August 2026; 20:00	DVSC Skyline	31–37	Győri Audi ETO	Hódos Imre Sports Hall, Debrecen; Attendance: 900; Referees: Bócz, Wiedemann (HUN)
22 August 2026; 20:00	Ivančok-Šoltić 6 (2)	(16–17)	Stanko 9 (5)	Hódos Imre Sports Hall, Debrecen; Attendance: 900; Referees: Bócz, Wiedemann (HUN)
22 August 2026; 20:00		Report		Hódos Imre Sports Hall, Debrecen; Attendance: 900; Referees: Bócz, Wiedemann (HUN)

- MVP of the tournament: Emilie Hovden (Győri Audi ETO)
- Top scorer of the tournament: Tjasa Stanko (Győri Audi ETO), 17 goals
- Best goalkeeper of the tournament: Jessica Ryde (DVSC SKYLINE)

28 August 2026; 15:30	DVSC Skyline	33–27	(Hungary) Kisvárda	Hódos Imre Sports Hall, Debrecen
28 August 2026; 15:30	Tóvizi and Ivančok-Šoltić 5 each	(16–17)		Hódos Imre Sports Hall, Debrecen
28 August 2026; 15:30		Report		Hódos Imre Sports Hall, Debrecen

== Competitions ==
=== Overall record ===
In italics, we indicate the Last match and the Final position achieved in competition(s) that have not yet been completed.

Competition	First match	Last match	Starting round	Final position	Record							
Competition	First match	Last match	Starting round	Final position	Pld	W	D	L	GF	GA	GD	Win %
K&H Liga (Nemzeti Bajnokság I)	3 September 2026	20 November 2026	Round 1	3rd	11	9	1	1	382	293	+89	81.82
Magyar Kupa (Hungarian Cup)	March 2027	TBD	Quarter-final	TBD	0	0	0	0	0	0	+0	—
EHF European League	January 2027	TBD	Group stage	TBD	0	0	0	0	0	0	+0	—
Total					11	9	1	1	382	293	+89	81.82

Last updated: 20 November 2026
Source: Competitions

=== Nemzeti Bajnokság I ===
The league was officially named K&H Liga for sponsorship reasons.

==== Results by round ====
Match	1	2	3	4	5	6	7	8	12	10	9	11	13	14	15	16	17	18	19	20	21	22	23	24	25	26
Ground	A	H	A	H	A	A	A	A	A	H	H	H	H	H	A	H	A	H	H	H	H	A	H	A	H	A
Result	W	W	W	W	D	W	W	W	L	W	W															
Position	4	4	4	4	4	3	3	3	3	3	3															
Points	2	4	6	8	9	11	13	15	15	17	19															
Details	d	d	d	d	d	d	d	d	d	d	d	d	d	d	d	d	d	d	d	d	d	d	d	d	d	d

Updated to match(es) played on 20 November 2026. Source: Matches
A = Away; H = Home; W = Win; D = Draw; L = Loss

==== Results overview ====
All results are indicated from the perspective of DVSC Skyline.
We indicate in parentheses the number of round.
Win Draw Loss Postponed

Opposition	City	Home score	Away score	Aggregate score	Double
Alba Fehérvár	Székesfehérvár	29–22 (2)	– (15)	29–22	
Moyra-Budaörs United Shipping	Budaörs	– (19)	37–31 (6)	37–31	
Eszterházy SC	Eger	– (14)	43–21 (1)	43–21	
MOL Esztergom	Esztergom	– (18)	29–29 (5)	29–29	No
FTC-Toyota Kovács	Budapest	24 Jan (13)	– (26)	–	
Győri Audi ETO	Győr	– (25)	26–36 (12)	26–36	No
Kisvárda Master Good	Kisvárda	34–18 (9)	– (24)	34–18	
MTK	Budapest	– (21)	42–23 (8)	42–23	
Motherson-Mosonmagyaróvár	Mosonmagyaróvár	38–28 (10)	– (23)	38–28	
NEKA (National Academy of Handball)	Balatonboglár	– (20)	34–25 (7)	34–25	
Gravitáció SZKKA	Szombathely	10 Jan (11)	– (24)	–	
Vasas	Budapest	33–27 (4)	– (17)	33–27	
Vác	Vác	– (16)	37–33 (3)	37–33	

==== Matches ====
Win Draw Loss Fixtures Postponed

Round 1; 3 September 2026; 18:00 CEST	Eszterházy SC	21–43	DVSC Skyline	Dr. Kemény Ferenc Sportcsarnok, Eger; Attendance: 500; Referees: Hajdu-Hársfalvi, Mórocz
Round 1; 3 September 2026; 18:00 CEST	Helm 6	(13–21)	Kobylińska 6 (2), Keller 6	Dr. Kemény Ferenc Sportcsarnok, Eger; Attendance: 500; Referees: Hajdu-Hársfalvi, Mórocz
Round 1; 3 September 2026; 18:00 CEST	3× (suspension)	Report	2× (suspension)	Dr. Kemény Ferenc Sportcsarnok, Eger; Attendance: 500; Referees: Hajdu-Hársfalvi, Mórocz

Round 2; 12 September 2026; 18:00 CEST	DVSC Skyline	29–22	Alba Fehérvár	Hódos Imre Sports Hall, Debrecen; Attendance: 1,300; Referees: Bátori, Szécsi
Round 2; 12 September 2026; 18:00 CEST	Toublanc 6 (1)	(17–10)	Pavlović 8	Hódos Imre Sports Hall, Debrecen; Attendance: 1,300; Referees: Bátori, Szécsi
Round 2; 12 September 2026; 18:00 CEST	4× (suspension)	Report	6× (suspension)	Hódos Imre Sports Hall, Debrecen; Attendance: 1,300; Referees: Bátori, Szécsi

Round 3; 20 September 2026; 18:00 CEST	Vác	33–37	DVSC Skyline	Városi Sportcsarnok, Vác; Attendance: 550; Referees: Hargitai, Markó
Round 3; 20 September 2026; 18:00 CEST	Pálmai, Juhász 5	(16–19)	Tóvizi 8	Városi Sportcsarnok, Vác; Attendance: 550; Referees: Hargitai, Markó
Round 3; 20 September 2026; 18:00 CEST	2× (suspension)	Report	1× (yellow card) 3× (suspension)	Városi Sportcsarnok, Vác; Attendance: 550; Referees: Hargitai, Markó

Round 4; 3 October 2026; 18:00 CEST	DVSC Skyline	33–27	Vasas SC	Hódos Imre Sports Hall, Debrecen; Attendance: 1,040; Referees: G. Kiu, T. Kiu
Round 4; 3 October 2026; 18:00 CEST	Kobylińska 8 (3)	(16–8)	N. Nagy 7 (2)	Hódos Imre Sports Hall, Debrecen; Attendance: 1,040; Referees: G. Kiu, T. Kiu
Round 4; 3 October 2026; 18:00 CEST	2× (suspension)	Report	2× (suspension)	Hódos Imre Sports Hall, Debrecen; Attendance: 1,040; Referees: G. Kiu, T. Kiu

Round 5; 10 October 2026; 16:00 CEST	MOL Esztergom	29–29	DVSC Skyline	Suzuki Aréna, Esztergom; Attendance: 1,000; Referees: Bócz, Wiedemann
Round 5; 10 October 2026; 16:00 CEST	Faragó 8 (3)	(14–16)	Kobylińska 6 (1)	Suzuki Aréna, Esztergom; Attendance: 1,000; Referees: Bócz, Wiedemann
Round 5; 10 October 2026; 16:00 CEST	3× (suspension)	Report	4× (suspension)	Suzuki Aréna, Esztergom; Attendance: 1,000; Referees: Bócz, Wiedemann

Round 6; 15 October 2026; 18:00 CEST	Moyra-Budaörs United Shipping	31–37	DVSC Skyline	Városi Sportcsarnok, Budaörs; Attendance: 120; Referees: Bóna, Földesi
Round 6; 15 October 2026; 18:00 CEST	Kármán 8	(18–26)	Kobylińska 14 (9)	Városi Sportcsarnok, Budaörs; Attendance: 120; Referees: Bóna, Földesi
Round 6; 15 October 2026; 18:00 CEST	2× (suspension)	Report	3× (suspension)	Városi Sportcsarnok, Budaörs; Attendance: 120; Referees: Bóna, Földesi

Round 7; 31 October 2026; 16:00 CET	Nemzeti Kézilabda Akadémia (NEKA)	25–34	DVSC Skyline	NEKA Csarnok, Balatonboglár; Attendance: 115; Referees: Hornyik, Zörgő
Round 7; 31 October 2026; 16:00 CET	Tóth-Kukely 5	(12–17)	Ivančok-Šoltić 14 (8)	NEKA Csarnok, Balatonboglár; Attendance: 115; Referees: Hornyik, Zörgő
Round 7; 31 October 2026; 16:00 CET	3× (suspension)	Report	4× (suspension)	NEKA Csarnok, Balatonboglár; Attendance: 115; Referees: Hornyik, Zörgő

Round 8; 7 November 2026; 17:00 CET	MTK Budapest	23–42	DVSC Skyline	Riz Levente Sport- és Rendezvényközpont, Budapest; Attendance: 150; Referees: Altmár, M. Horváth
Round 8; 7 November 2026; 17:00 CET	L. Szabó 10 (4)	(14–22)	Kobylińska 7 (1)	Riz Levente Sport- és Rendezvényközpont, Budapest; Attendance: 150; Referees: Altmár, M. Horváth
Round 8; 7 November 2026; 17:00 CET	2× (suspension)	Report	5× (suspension)	Riz Levente Sport- és Rendezvényközpont, Budapest; Attendance: 150; Referees: Altmár, M. Horváth

Round 12; 11 November 2026; 18:00 CET	Győri Audi ETO KC	36–26	DVSC Skyline	Audi Aréna, Győr; Attendance: 2,473; Referees: Felhő, Öcsi
Round 12; 11 November 2026; 18:00 CET	Bouktit 8	(17–12)	Ivančok-Šoltić 6 (2)	Audi Aréna, Győr; Attendance: 2,473; Referees: Felhő, Öcsi
Round 12; 11 November 2026; 18:00 CET	1× (yellow card) 4× (suspension)	Report	3× (suspension)	Audi Aréna, Győr; Attendance: 2,473; Referees: Felhő, Öcsi

Round 10; 15 November 2026; 18:00 CET	DVSC Skyline	38–28	Motherson-Mosonmagyaróvár	Hódos Imre Sports Hall, Debrecen; Attendance: 947; Referees: Hajdu-Hársfalvi, Mórocz
Round 10; 15 November 2026; 18:00 CET	Toublanc 9 (3)	(18–14)	Plamenova Tomova 10	Hódos Imre Sports Hall, Debrecen; Attendance: 947; Referees: Hajdu-Hársfalvi, Mórocz
Round 10; 15 November 2026; 18:00 CET	1× (suspension)	Report	3× (suspension) 1× (red card)	Hódos Imre Sports Hall, Debrecen; Attendance: 947; Referees: Hajdu-Hársfalvi, Mórocz

Round 9; 20 November 2026; 18:00 CET	DVSC Skyline	34–18	Kisvárda Master Good SE	Hódos Imre Sports Hall, Debrecen; Attendance: 900; Referees: Garai, Varasdi
Round 9; 20 November 2026; 18:00 CET	Ivančok-Šoltić 10 (2)	(17–10)	Gém, Kostyó 3 each	Hódos Imre Sports Hall, Debrecen; Attendance: 900; Referees: Garai, Varasdi
Round 9; 20 November 2026; 18:00 CET	1× (suspension)	Report	3× (suspension)	Hódos Imre Sports Hall, Debrecen; Attendance: 900; Referees: Garai, Varasdi

Round 11; 3 January 2027; 18:00 CET	DVSC Skyline	v	Gravitáció SZKKA (Szombathely)	Hódos Imre Sports Hall, Debrecen
Round 11; 3 January 2027; 18:00 CET		(–)		Hódos Imre Sports Hall, Debrecen

Round 13; 20 January 2027; 18:00 CET	DVSC Skyline	v	FTC-Toyota Kovács	Hódos Imre Sports Hall, Debrecen
Round 13; 20 January 2027; 18:00 CET		(–)		Hódos Imre Sports Hall, Debrecen

Round 14; 29 January 2027; 18:00 CET	DVSC Skyline	v	Eszterházy SC	Hódos Imre Sports Hall, Debrecen
Round 14; 29 January 2027; 18:00 CET		(–)		Hódos Imre Sports Hall, Debrecen

Round 15; 3 February 2027; 17:00 CET	Alba Fehérvár	v	DVSC Skyline	Köfém Sportcsarnok, Székesfehérvár
Round 15; 3 February 2027; 17:00 CET		(–)		Köfém Sportcsarnok, Székesfehérvár

Round 16; 17 February 2027; 18:00 CET	DVSC Skyline	v	Vác	Hódos Imre Sports Hall, Debrecen
Round 16; 17 February 2027; 18:00 CET		(–)		Hódos Imre Sports Hall, Debrecen

Round 17; 27 February 2027; 18:00 CET	Vasas SC	v	DVSC Skyline	Sterbinszky Amália Kézilabdacsarnok, Budapest
Round 17; 27 February 2027; 18:00 CET		(–)		Sterbinszky Amália Kézilabdacsarnok, Budapest

Round 18; 13 March 2027; 18:00 CET	DVSC Skyline	v	MOL Esztergom	Hódos Imre Sports Hall, Debrecen
Round 18; 13 March 2027; 18:00 CET		(–)		Hódos Imre Sports Hall, Debrecen

Round 19; 20 March 2027; 18:00 CET	DVSC Skyline	v	Moyra-Budaörs United Shipping	Hódos Imre Sports Hall, Debrecen
Round 19; 20 March 2027; 18:00 CET		(–)		Hódos Imre Sports Hall, Debrecen

Round 20; 27 March 2027; 18:00 CET	DVSC Skyline	v	Nemzeti Kézilabda Akadémia (NEKA)	Hódos Imre Sports Hall, Debrecen
Round 20; 27 March 2027; 18:00 CET		(–)		Hódos Imre Sports Hall, Debrecen

Round 21; 3 April 2027; 18:00 CEST	DVSC Skyline	v	MTK Budapest	Hódos Imre Sports Hall, Debrecen
Round 21; 3 April 2027; 18:00 CEST		(–)		Hódos Imre Sports Hall, Debrecen

Round 22; 17 April 2027; 18:00 CEST	Kisvárda Master Good SE	v	DVSC Skyline	Halasy Gyula Városi Sportcsarnok, Kisvárda
Round 22; 17 April 2027; 18:00 CEST		(–)		Halasy Gyula Városi Sportcsarnok, Kisvárda

Round 23; 21 April 2027; 18:00 CEST	Motherson-Mosonmagyaróvár	v	DVSC Skyline	UFM Aréna, Mosonmagyaróvár
Round 23; 21 April 2027; 18:00 CEST		(–)		UFM Aréna, Mosonmagyaróvár

Round 24; 30 April 2027; 18:00 CEST	Gravitáció SZKKA (Szombathely)	v	DVSC Skyline	Haladás Sportkomplexum, Szombathely
Round 24; 30 April 2027; 18:00 CEST		(–)		Haladás Sportkomplexum, Szombathely

Round 25; 9 May 2027; 18:00 CEST	DVSC Skyline	v	Győri Audi ETO KC	Hódos Imre Sports Hall, Debrecen
Round 25; 9 May 2027; 18:00 CEST		(–)		Hódos Imre Sports Hall, Debrecen

Round 26; 22 May 2027; 18:00 CEST	FTC-Toyota Kovács	v	DVSC Skyline	Elek Gyula Aréna, Budapest
Round 26; 22 May 2027; 18:00 CEST		(–)		Elek Gyula Aréna, Budapest

Source: MKSZ (Hungarian Handball Federation)

=== Hungarian Cup ===
Win Draw Loss Fixtures Postponed

==== Quarter-final ====
First match will be played in March 2027.

TBD	DVSC Skyline	v	TBD	TBD; Referees: TBD
TBD		(–)		TBD; Referees: TBD

=== EHF European League ===
Win Draw Loss Fixtures Postponed

==== Group stage ====
The draw for the Group stage was held on 19 November 2026.

Pos	Team	Pld	W	D	L	GF	GA	GD	Pts	Qualification	BER	DEB	ZAG	VIB
1	(Norway) Tertnes Bergen	0	0	0	0	0	0	0	0	Quarterfinals	—	–	–	–
2	(Hungary) DVSC Skyline	0	0	0	0	0	0	0	0	Quarterfinals	–	—	–	–
3	(Croatia) RK Lokomotiva Zagreb	0	0	0	0	0	0	0	0		–	–	—	–
4	(Denmark) Viborg HK	0	0	0	0	0	0	0	0		–	–	–	—

Updated to match(es) played on Pre-season. Source: EHF

===== Matches =====
Group phase games run from January 9 to February 21, 2027, with the top two teams from each group advancing to the quarter-finals on March 20–28.

===== Matches =====
Win Draw Loss Fixtures Postponed

9 or 10 January 2027	DVSC Skyline (Hungary)	v	(Norway) Tertnes Bergen	Hódos Imre Sports Hall, Debrecen

16 or 17 January 2027	Viborg (Denmark)	v	(Hungary) DVSC Skyline	BioCirc Arena, Viborg

23 or 24 January 2027	Lokomotiva Zagreb (Croatia)	v	(Hungary) DVSC Skyline	Dom Sportova, Zagreb

6 or 7 February 2027	DVSC Skyline (Hungary)	v	(Croatia) Lokomotiva Zagreb	Hódos Imre Sports Hall, Debrecen

13 or 14 February 2027	Tertnes Bergen (Norway)	v	(Hungary) DVSC Skyline	Åsane Arena, Bergen

20 or 21 February 2027	DVSC Skyline (Hungary)	v	(Denmark) Viborg	Hódos Imre Sports Hall, Debrecen

== Statistics ==
=== Squad statistics ===
Source: MKSZ Adatbank (Data bank of Hungarian Handball Federation)

As of match played 20 November 2026

No.	Player	Pos.	Nat.	DoB	K&H Liga (Domestic league)				Magyar Kupa (Domestic cup)				EHF European League				Season total			
No.	Player	Pos.	Nat.	DoB	Apps.	G.	7mG	2mS	Apps.	G.	7mG	2mS	Apps.	G.	7mG	2mS	Apps.	G.	7mG	2mS
3	Alicia Toublanc	RW	(France)	1996	9	48	17	0	0	0	0	0	0	0	0	0	9	48	17	0
5	Konszuéla Hámori	RB	(Hungary)	1996	11	25	0	2	0	0	0	0	0	0	0	0	11	25	0	2
8	Monika Kobylinska	RB	(Poland)	1995	11	62	19	1	0	0	0	0	0	0	0	0	11	62	19	1
9	Kata Juhász	LP	(Hungary)	2004	11	17	0	7	0	0	0	0	0	0	0	0	11	17	0	7
10	Petra Keller	RW	(Hungary)	2008	4	11	0	3	0	0	0	0	0	0	0	0	4	11	0	3
11	Flóra Magyar	RW	(Hungary)	2007	10	13	0	2	0	0	0	0	0	0	0	0	10	13	0	2
12	Jessica Ryde	GK	(Sweden)	1994	7	1	0	0	0	0	0	0	0	0	0	0	7	1	0	0
13	Petra Füzi-Tóvizi (captain)	LP	(Hungary)	1999	11	36	0	5	0	0	0	0	0	0	0	0	11	36	0	5
14	Ines Ivančok-Šoltić	LB	(Austria)	1998	9	62	15	2	0	0	0	0	0	0	0	0	9	62	15	2
22	Jovana Jovović	LB	(Serbia)	2001	7	7	0	2	0	0	0	0	0	0	0	0	7	7	0	2
24	Míra Vámos	LW	(Hungary)	2003	11	35	0	1	0	0	0	0	0	0	0	0	11	35	0	1
25	Liliána Csernyánszki	CB	(Hungary)	2004	6	13	0	2	0	0	0	0	0	0	0	0	6	13	0	2
26	Luca Ratalics	RW	(Hungary)	2006	8	14	0	1	0	0	0	0	0	0	0	0	8	14	0	1
29	Kristin Thorleifsdóttir	LB	(Sweden)	1998	5	9	0	5	0	0	0	0	0	0	0	0	5	9	0	5
36	Dorottya Baranyi	CB	(Hungary)	2006	11	7	0	0	0	0	0	0	0	0	0	0	11	7	0	0
42	Nikol Litschauer		(Hungary)	2008	1	3	0	1	0	0	0	0	0	0	0	0	1	3	0	1
51	Réka Kis		(Hungary)	2009	2	0	0	0	0	0	0	0	0	0	0	0	2	0	0	0
69	Katalin Varga		(Hungary)	2007	4	3	0	0	0	0	0	0	0	0	0	0	4	3	0	0
71	Mirtill Petrus	LW	(Hungary)	2001	6	14	0	0	0	0	0	0	0	0	0	0	6	14	0	0
81	Nina Szabó	CB	(Hungary)	2001	1	0	0	0	0	0	0	0	0	0	0	0	1	0	0	0
85	Gréta Majoros	GK	(Hungary)	2007	8	1	0	0	0	0	0	0	0	0	0	0	8	1	0	0
93	Adrianna Płaczek	GK	(Poland)	1993	11	0	0	0	0	0	0	0	0	0	0	0	11	0	0	0
