= 2024–25 Magyar Kupa (women's handball) =

Hungarian women's handball season

Török Bódog női Magyar Kupa

Tournament details
- Country: Hungary
- Dates: 11 September 2024 – 2 March 2025
- Teams: 31

Final positions
- Champions: FTC-Rail Cargo Hungaria (16th title)
- Runners-up: Győri Audi ETO KC
- Third place: Moyra-Budaörs Handball
- Fourth place: Motherson Mosonmagyaróvár

The 2024–25 Magyar Kupa (English: Hungarian Cup) is the 67th season of Hungary's annual knock-out cup handball competition. The full name of the competition is Török Bódog női Magyar Kupa in honor of the Hungarian handball legend Bódog Török.

== Schedule ==
Times up to 26 October 2024 and from 30 March 2025 are CEST (UTC+2). Times from 27 October 2024 to 29 March 2025 are CET (UTC+1).

The rounds of the 2024–25 competition are scheduled as follows:

Round	Draw date and time	Matches	Fixtures	Clubs	New entries	Leagues entering
First round		11 September 2024	1	2 → 1	2	Nemzeti Bajnokság I/B (Tier 2) and, Nemzeti Bajnokság II (Tier 3)
Second round	16 September 2024, 11:28	9 October 2024	8	16 → 8	14	Nemzeti Bajnokság I/B (Tier 2) and, Nemzeti Bajnokság II (Tier 3)
Third round	14 October 2024, 11:53	30 October 2024	8	16 → 8	8	Nemzeti Bajnokság I (Tier 1), places 7–14
Fourth round	4 November 2024, 11:41	22 December 2024	6	12 → 6	4	Nemzeti Bajnokság I (Tier 1), places 3–6
Quarter-finals	2 January 2025, 12:47	14–18 January 2025	4	8 → 4	2	Nemzeti Bajnokság I (Tier 1), places 1–2
Final four	29 January 2025, 19:59	1–2 March 2025	4	4 → 1	none	none

== Teams ==
A total of 32 teams competed in the 2024–25 edition, comprising 14 teams from the Nemzeti Bajnokság I (Tier 1), 14 teams from the Nemzeti Bajnokság I/B (Tier 2) and 4 teams from the Nemzeti Bajnokság II (Tier 3).

=== Nemzeti Bajnokság I (Tier 1) ===
- Alba Fehérvár KC
- TAPPE-Békéscsabai Előre NKSE
- Moyra-Budaörs Handball
- DVSC Schaeffler
- Dunaújvárosi Kohász KA
- MOL Esztergom
- FTC-Rail Cargo Hungaria
- Győri Audi ETO KC
- Kisvárda Master Good SE
- Motherson-Mosonmagyaróvár KC
- MTK Budapest
- Szombathelyi KKA
- Vasas SC
- Vác

=== Nemzeti Bajnokság I/B (Tier 2) ===
- Eszterházy SC
- Euro-Novex Utánpótlás SE
- Érd HC
- Gárdony-Pázmánd NKK
- Hajdúnánás Kézilabda NKFT
- Komárom VSE
- Kozármisleny KA
- Mohácsi TE 1888
- NEKA
- Szigetszentmiklós NKSE
- SZISE
- Tempo KSE
- Zengő Alföld Orosházi KA

=== Nemzeti Bajnokság II (Tier 3) ===
- Balmazújváros KSE
- Borsod Sport Klub-Kazincbarcika
- Füzesabonyi SC
- VKS Tököl

== Matches ==
A total of 32 matches took place, starting with First round on 30 August 2024 and culminating with the Final on 2 March 2025.

=== First round ===
The first round ties was scheduled for 30 August 2024.

Team 1	Score	Team 2
30 August 2024
Balmazújváros KSE (3)	22–51	Eszterházy SC (2)

=== Second round ===
The second round ties was scheduled for 25 September–9 October 2024.

Team 1	Score	Team 2
25 September
Füzesabonyi SC (3)	22–33	Eszterházy SC (2)
26 September
Gárdony-Pázmánd NKK (2)	29–26	Kozármisleny KA (2)
Komárom VSE (2)	25–29	Érd HC (2)
Zengő Alföld Orosházi KA (2)	37–26	Tempo KSE (2)
27 September
Mohácsi TE 1888 (2)	28–36	NEKA (2)
VKS Tököl (3)	28–33	Euro-Novex Utánpótlás SE (2)
2 October
SZISE (2)	28–28	Szigetszentmiklós NKSE (2)
9 October
Borsod Sport Klub-Kazincbarcika (3)	36–30	Hajdúnánás Kézilabda NKFT (2)

=== Third round ===
The third round ties was scheduled for 22–30 October 2024.

Team 1	Score	Team 2
22 October
Zengő Alföld Orosházi KA (2)	24–34	Vasas (1)
25 October
Eszterházy SC (2)	25–32	Moyra-Budaörs Handball (1)
Borsod Sport Klub-Kazincbarcika (3)	22–32	Kisvárda (1)
29 October
Euro-Novex Utánpótlás SE (2)	26–28	TAPPE-Békéscsabai Előre NKSE (1)
30 October
Dunaújvárosi Kohász KA (1)	47–15	Szombathely (1)
Gárdony-Pázmánd NKK (2)	34–38	NEKA (2)
Alba Fehérvár (1)	31–27	MOL Esztergom (1)
Szigetszentmiklós NKSE (2)	33–33	Érd (2)

=== Fourth round ===
The fourth round ties was scheduled for 11–22 December 2024.

Team 1	Score	Team 2
11 December
Érd (2)	32–33	Vasas (1)
18 December
Moyra-Budaörs Handball (1)	29–27	Dunaújvárosi Kohász KA (1)
Motherson Mosonmagyaróvár (1)	36–27	Kisvárda Master Good SE (1)
21 December
TAPPE-Békéscsabai Előre NKSE (1)	24–24 (a)	Alba Fehérvár (1)
MTK Budapest (1)	23–34	DVSC Schaeffler (1)
22 December
NEKA (2)	18–32	Vác (1)

=== Quarter-finals ===
The quarter-finals ties was scheduled for 14–18 January 2025.

Team 1	Score	Team 2
14 January
Vác (1)	25–32	FTC-Rail Cargo Hungaria (1)
15 January
Győri Audi ETO (1)	42–22	Alba Fehérvár (1)
Motherson Mosonmagyaróvár (1)	30–27	DVSC Schaeffler (1)
18 January
Moyra-Budaörs Handball (1)	37–29	Vasas (1)

==== Matches ====
14 January 2025; 18:00 CET	Vác (1)	25–32	FTC-Rail Cargo Hungaria (1)	Városi Sportcsarnok, Vác; Attendance: 660; Referees: György Sándor, Balázs Szabó (HUN)
14 January 2025; 18:00 CET	Afentaler 6	(11–14)	Simon 6	Városi Sportcsarnok, Vác; Attendance: 660; Referees: György Sándor, Balázs Szabó (HUN)
14 January 2025; 18:00 CET	2× (suspension)	Report	2× (suspension)	Városi Sportcsarnok, Vác; Attendance: 660; Referees: György Sándor, Balázs Szabó (HUN)

15 January 2025; 17:00 CET	Győri Audi ETO (1)	42–22	Alba Fehérvár (1)	Audi Aréna, Győr; Attendance: 889; Referees: Tibor Kovács, Balázs Mándli (HUN)
15 January 2025; 17:00 CET	Győri-Lukács 8	(18–14)	Smbatian	Audi Aréna, Győr; Attendance: 889; Referees: Tibor Kovács, Balázs Mándli (HUN)
15 January 2025; 17:00 CET		Report	3× (suspension)	Audi Aréna, Győr; Attendance: 889; Referees: Tibor Kovács, Balázs Mándli (HUN)

15 January 2025; 18:00 CET	Motherson Mosonmagyaróvár (1)	30–27	DVSC Schaeffler (1)	UFM Aréna, Mosonmagyaróvár; Attendance: 700; Referees: Ferenc Nagy, József Túróczy (HUN)
15 January 2025; 18:00 CET	Varga 10	(15–16)	Jovović 8	UFM Aréna, Mosonmagyaróvár; Attendance: 700; Referees: Ferenc Nagy, József Túróczy (HUN)
15 January 2025; 18:00 CET	1× (yellow card) 4× (suspension)	Report	1× (yellow card) 8× (suspension)	UFM Aréna, Mosonmagyaróvár; Attendance: 700; Referees: Ferenc Nagy, József Túróczy (HUN)

18 January 2025; 17:00 CET	Moyra-Budaörs Handball (1)	37–29	Vasas (1)	Városi Uszoda és Sportcsarnok, Budaörs; Attendance: 970; Referees: Gábor Hargitai, Gábor Markó (HUN)
18 January 2025; 17:00 CET	Bardi 7	(23–11)	Farkas 10	Városi Uszoda és Sportcsarnok, Budaörs; Attendance: 970; Referees: Gábor Hargitai, Gábor Markó (HUN)
18 January 2025; 17:00 CET	1× (yellow card) 3× (suspension)	Report	3× (suspension)	Városi Uszoda és Sportcsarnok, Budaörs; Attendance: 970; Referees: Gábor Hargitai, Gábor Markó (HUN)

== Final four ==
The final four will be hold on 1–2 March 2025 at the Tatabányai Multifunkcionális Sportcsarnok in Tatabánya.

Semi-finals
1 March, 15:00
Győri Audi ETO KC	38
Moyra-Budaörs Handball	28
1 March, 17:30
FTC-Rail Cargo Hungaria	32
Motherson Mosonmagyaróvár	26

Final
2 March, 15:45
Győri Audi ETO KC	23 (1)
FTC-Rail Cargo Hungaria (pen.)	23 (2)
Bronze medal match
2 March, 13:00
Moyra-Budaörs Handball	22
Motherson Mosonmagyaróvár	18

=== Awards ===
- Most valuable player:
- Best Goalkeeper:

==== Final standings ====
	Team
	FTC-Rail Cargo Hungaria; 16th title
Silver medal	Győri Audi ETO KC
Bronze medal	Moyra-Budaörs Handball
4th	Motherson Mosonmagyaróvár

=== Semi-finals ===
1 March 2025; 15:00	Győri Audi ETO KC	38–28	Moyra-Budaörs Handball	Tatabányai Multifunkcionális Sportcsarnok, Tatabánya; Attendance: 3,099; Referees: Fekete, Hajdu
1 March 2025; 15:00	Housheer 8	(19–13)	Bardi 5	Tatabányai Multifunkcionális Sportcsarnok, Tatabánya; Attendance: 3,099; Referees: Fekete, Hajdu
1 March 2025; 15:00		Report	2× (suspension)	Tatabányai Multifunkcionális Sportcsarnok, Tatabánya; Attendance: 3,099; Referees: Fekete, Hajdu

1 March 2025; 17:30	FTC-Rail Cargo Hungaria	32–26	Motherson Mosonmagyaróvár	Tatabányai Multifunkcionális Sportcsarnok, Tatabánya; Attendance: 3,277; Referees: Nagy, Túróczy
1 March 2025; 17:30	Bölk 7	(20–12)	Ivančok-Šoltić 9	Tatabányai Multifunkcionális Sportcsarnok, Tatabánya; Attendance: 3,277; Referees: Nagy, Túróczy
1 March 2025; 17:30	1× (yellow card) 2× (suspension)	Report	1× (yellow card) 3× (suspension)	Tatabányai Multifunkcionális Sportcsarnok, Tatabánya; Attendance: 3,277; Referees: Nagy, Túróczy

=== Bronze medal match ===
2 March 2025; 13:00	Moyra-Budaörs Handball	22–18	Motherson Mosonmagyaróvár	Tatabányai Multifunkcionális Sportcsarnok, Tatabánya; Attendance: 4,089; Referees: Dáné, Marton
2 March 2025; 13:00	Uhrin 7	(9–9)	Ivančok-Šoltić 7	Tatabányai Multifunkcionális Sportcsarnok, Tatabánya; Attendance: 4,089; Referees: Dáné, Marton
2 March 2025; 13:00	1× (yellow card) 2× (suspension)	Report	6× (suspension)	Tatabányai Multifunkcionális Sportcsarnok, Tatabánya; Attendance: 4,089; Referees: Dáné, Marton

=== Final ===
2 March 2025
15:45
Győri Audi ETO KC
24–25
FTC-Rail Cargo Hungaria
Tatabányai Multifunkcionális Sportcsarnok, Tatabánya
Attendance: 5,550
Referees: Horváth, Marton
Housheer 11
(15–10)
Maslova 5
2× (yellow card) 2× (suspension)
Report
2× (suspension)

FT: 23–23 Pen: 1–2

2024–25 Magyar Kupa
Winner

FTC-Rail Cargo Hungaria
16th title

Réka Bordás, Emily Bölk, Dragana Cvijić, Béatrice Edwige, Laura Glauser, Júlia Hársfalvi, Kinga Janurik, Orlane Kanor, Katrin Klujber, Andrea Lekić, Angela Malestein, Valeriia Maslova, Gréta Márton, Dorka Papp, Petra Simon, Diána Szilágyi, Szandra Szöllősi-Zácsik, Zsuzsanna Tomori
Head coach: Allan Heine

== See also ==
- 2024–25 Nemzeti Bajnokság I
- 2024–25 Nemzeti Bajnokság I/B
- 2024–25 Nemzeti Bajnokság II
