= 2024–25 Nemzeti Bajnokság I (women's handball) =

Nemzeti Bajnokság I
- Season: 2024–25
- Dates: 3 September 2024 – 24 May 2025
- Champion: Győri Audi ETO KC; 18th title
- Relegated: MTK Budapest; Tappe-Békéscsabai Előre NKSE
- Champions League: Győri Audi ETO KC; FTC-Rail Cargo Hungaria
- European League: MOL Esztergom; DVSC Schaeffler; Motherson-Mosonmagyaróvár
- Matches played: 182
- Goals scored: 10,768 (59.16 per match)
- Top goalscorer: Rebeka Pődör (237 goals)

The 2024–25 Nemzeti Bajnokság I (known as the K&H női kézilabda liga for sponsorship reasons) was the 74th season of the Nemzeti Bajnokság I, the top women's handball league in Hungary. A total of fourteen teams contest this season's league, which began on 3 September 2024 and concluded on 24 May 2025.

Győri Audi ETO KC won their eighteenth title.

== Teams ==
=== Team changes ===
Promoted from 2023–24 Nemzeti Bajnokság I/B	Relegated from 2023–24 Nemzeti Bajnokság I
Szombathelyi KKA; Esztergomi KC	NEKA; Kozármisleny KA

=== Arenas and locations ===
Location of teams in 2024–25 Nemzeti Bajnokság I
Location of Budapest teams

Team	Location	Arena	Capacity
Alba Fehérvár KC	Székesfehérvár	KÖFÉM Sports Hall	1,000
Békéscsabai Előre NKSE	Békéscsaba	Municipal Sports Hall	2,300
Budaörs Handball	Budaörs	Városi Uszoda és Sportcsarnok	1,000
Debreceni VSC	Debrecen	Hódos Imre Sports Hall; Főnix Hall	2,250; 8,500
Dunaújvárosi Kohász KA	Dunaújváros	Municipal Sports Hall	1,200
Esztergomi KC	Esztergom	Suzuki Aréna	640
Ferencvárosi TC	Budapest (Ferencváros)	Elek Gyula Aréna	1,300
Győri Audi ETO KC	Győr	Audi Aréna	5,500
Kisvárdai KC	Kisvárda	Municipal Sports Hall	1,000
MTK Budapest	Budapest	Elektromos hall	500
Mosonmagyaróvári KC SE	Mosonmagyaróvár	UFM Aréna	1,100
Szombathelyi KKA	Szombathely	Haladás Sportkomplexum	458
Vasas SC	Budapest (Angyalföld)	Sterbinszky Amália Kézilabdacsarnok	600
Váci NKSE	Vác	Municipal Sports Hall	700

==== Number of teams by counties and regions ====
Number of teams by counties
Pos.	County (megye)	No. of teams	Teams
1	Budapest (capital)	3	Ferencvárosi TC and MTK and Vasas SC
2	Fejér	2	Alba Fehérvár KC and Dunaújvárosi Kohász KA
2	Győr-Moson-Sopron	2	Győri ETO KC and Mosonmagyaróvári KC
2	Pest	2	Moyra-Budaörs Handball and Váci NKSE
5	Békés	1	Békéscsabai Előre NKSE
5	Hajdú-Bihar	1	Debreceni VSC
5	Komárom-Esztergom	1	Esztergomi KC
5	Szabolcs-Szatmár-Bereg	1	Kisvárdai KC
5	Vas	1	Szombathelyi KKA

Number of teams by regions
Transdanubia	Central Hungary	Great Plain and North
Alba Fehérvár KC; Dunaújvárosi Kohász KA; Esztergomi KC; Győri ETO KC; Mosonmagyaróvári KC; Szombathelyi KKA	Moyra-Budaörs Handball; Ferencvárosi TC; MTK Budapest; Vasas SC; Váci NKSE	Békéscsabai Előre NKSE; Debreceni VSC; Kisvárdai KC
6 Teams	5 Teams	3 Teams

=== Personnel and kits ===
Hungarian national sports betting brand Tippmix sponsored all 14 teams of the first league since February 2019, their logo were present on all team kits.

Team	Head coach	Captain	Kit maker	Kit sponsors	
Team	Head coach	Captain	Kit maker	Main	Other(s)
Alba Fehérvár KC	(Montenegro) Suzana Lazović		Erima	BalaLake Resort	List: Front: City of Székesfehérvár; Back: Collagenius, Caring Medical Center; Sleeves: Bock, Velence Resort & Spa; Shorts: Viszló Trans, megasport, PatikaPlus
Békéscsabai Előre NKSE	(Hungary) Gábor Herbert	(Hungary) Laura Bencsik-Giricz	Jako	Tappe	List: Front: Hidro; Back: Galéria Invest, Sporthotel Békéscsaba; Shorts: bmc
Budaörs Handball	(Hungary) Dániel Buday		Kodiak	Moyra, adamstudios	List: Front: L33 Medical; Back: MKIF, Tetra Pak, United Shipping; Sleeves: SugárTerv; Shorts: Részi Property
Debreceni VSC	(Hungary) Zoltán Szilágyi	(Hungary) Dóra Hornyák	Kappa	Schaeffler, Kermann IT, Tranzit-Food	List: Front: Cívis Ház, BCB higénia, Harro Höfliger, City of Debrecen; Back: Debrecen Autó, OTP Bank, Thermodan; Sleeves: EBH Invest; Shorts: University of Debrecen, miko coffee, Pentasol, Hofmann
Dunaújvárosi Kohász KA	(Hungary) Péter Gulyás		Erima	Greenergy, Dunaújvárosi Vagyonkezelő	List: Front: City of Dunaújváros; Sleeves: Jysk; Back: Dunanett, Kemi-Ker; Shorts: Di-Fer AutóCsoport, om Desing
Esztergomi KC	(Hungary) Gábor Elek	(Hungary) Anett Kisfaludy	Puma	MOL	List: Back: Suzuki, Grand Hotel Esztergom; Sleeves: TE Connectivity, Kirchhoff; Shorts: Neuzer, HunGast
Ferencvárosi TC	(Denmark) Allan Heine	(Hungary) Blanka Bíró	Macron	Rail Cargo Hungaria	List: Back: Toyota Kovács; Shorts: MVM, Telekom
Győri Audi ETO KC	(Sweden) Per Johansson	(Norway) Kari Brattset Dale	Mizuno	Audi	List: Front: City of Győr, TCL, OTP Bank; Back: EndoPlus Service, Leier; Sleeves: Oil!; Shorts: zöldfa, Szimpatika
Kisvárdai KC	(Hungary) Krisztián Józsa	(Hungary) Szabina Karnik	Hummel	MasterGood	List: Front: City of Kisvárda, Nyírzem, Warda Coffee; Back: Várda Sport Hotel, Casino Tropicana Miskolc; Shorts: Háda
MTK Budapest	(Hungary) Péter Woth	(Hungary) Noémi Dakos	Nike	Profield, WU2	List: Back: Škoda Auto Derzbach
Mosonmagyaróvári KC SE	(Hungary) Ferenc Stanigg	(Hungary) Eszter Tóth	Stanno	Motherson	List: Front: UFM, MVM, United Shipping; Backs: UFM, Strabag, Menton Jobs; Shorts: City of Mosonmagyaróvár
Szombathelyi KKA	(Denmark) Bo Rudgaard	(Hungary) Rebeka Pődör	Erima	Gravitáció, Kozma Szerszám	List: Front: HS Sport; Back: Clear '97, Trend Optika, Grantia; Sleeves: Friss.hu; Shorts: Alpok Autó Volvo, Gáspár Mérnöki Iroda, loce.hu
Vasas SC	(Hungary) Csaba Konkoly	(Hungary) Katalin Dombi	Joma	ConNext.hu	None
Váci NKSE	(Hungary) Roland Horváth	(Hungary) Anna Bukovszky	Erima	Volkswagen	List: Back: Lukács és Tamás Kft., MVM

== League table ==
Pos	Team	Pld	W	D	L	GF	GA	GD	Pts	Qualification or relegation
1	Győri Audi ETO KC (C)	26	25	0	1	979	617	+362	50	Qualification for the Champions League group stage
2	FTC-Rail Cargo Hungaria	26	24	1	1	927	645	+282	49	Qualification for the Champions League group stage
3	MOL Esztergomi KC	26	21	0	5	808	741	+67	42 (Note: MOL Eszergomi KC finished ahead of DVSC Schaeffler on head-to-head goal difference: Esztergom 21–22 Debrecen, Debrecen 28–34 Esztergom.)	Qualification for the European League third qualifying round
4	DVSC Schaeffler	26	20	2	4	851	691	+160	42	Qualification for the Champions League group stage
5	Motherson Mosonmagyaróvári KC	26	12	2	12	749	792	−43	26	Qualification for the European League second qualifying round
6	Kisvárda Master Good SE	26	11	2	13	636	709	−73	24 (Note: Kisvárda Master Good SE finished ahead of Vác on head-to-head goal difference: Kisvárda 28–23 Vác, Vác 26–25 Kisvárda.)	
7	Vác	26	12	0	14	752	787	−35	24	
8	Szombathelyi KKA	26	9	5	12	738	814	−76	23	
9	Alba Fehérvár KC	26	8	1	17	713	767	−54	17	
10	Dunaújvárosi Kohász KA	26	7	2	17	771	865	−94	16 (Note: Dunaújvárosi Kohász KA finished ahead of Moyra-Budaörs Handball on head-to-head goal difference: Dunaújváros 39–25 Budaörs, Budaörs 33–28 Dunaújváros.)	
11	Tappe-Békéscsabai Előre NKSE	26	7	2	17	692	820	−128	16	
12	Vasas SC	26	6	2	18	711	845	−134	14	
13	MTK Budapest (R)	26	5	1	20	723	862	−139	11	Relegation to the Nemzeti Bajnokság I/B
14	Tappe-Békéscsabai Előre NKSE (R)	26	4	2	20	718	813	−95	10	Relegation to the Nemzeti Bajnokság I/B

Source: Hungarian Handball Federation (in Hungarian), Flashscore
Rules for classification: 1) Points; 2) Head-to-head points; 3) Head-to-head goal difference; 4) Goal difference; 5) Goals scored; 6) Matches won; 7) Draw (Note: Head-to-head record is used only after all the matches between the teams in question have been played)
(C) Champions; (R) Relegated

== Results ==
Home \ Away	BÉK	BUD	DEB	DUN	EKC	FEH	FTC	GYŐ	KIS	MOS	MTK	SZO	VAS	VÁC
Tappe-Békéscsabai Előre NKSE	—	22–25	25–34	33–31	29–30	21–20	32–38	28–37	27–23	25–29	28–29	26–26	27–28	25–29
Moyra-Budaörs Handball	28–28	—	23–36	33–28	25–36	24–22	24–37	26–41	27–30	25–29	32–30	29–36	32–34	25–29
DVSC Schaeffler	42–23	28–28	—	36–25	28–34	34–28	26–26	28–36	35–23	39–22	43–33	32–20	38–24	36–28
Dunaújvárosi Kohász KA	37–35	39–25	23–37	—	29–34	37–29	32–37	29–44	30–24	29–31	36–30	27–34	32–32	32–30
MOL Esztergomi KC	35–27	36–26	21–22	37–24	—	25–23	30–34	24–45	27–19	35–30	49–35	35–22	30–26	27–25
Alba Fehérvár KC	33–29	34–29	27–32	26–29	28–31	—	21–32	29–31	22–18	32–29	31–26	23–23	36–34	32–26
FTC-Rail Cargo Hungaria	35–27	38–18	41–24	41–31	37–28	38–24	—	23–18	25–20	37–18	41–22	46–20	39–21	42–32
Győri Audi ETO KC	37–26	39–23	29–28	42–21	43–20	34–23	32–24	—	39–17	32–21	38–23	32–22	42–15	47–20
Kisvárda Master Good SE	23–19	31–22	20–30	28–24	21–31	30–27	21–36	23–37	—	31–28	29–28	34–34	31–27	28–23
Motherson Mosonmagyaróvári KC	31–27	35–29	29–31	35–32	31–32	35–27	23–29	22–45	27–27	—	36–36	33–30	25–20	25–26
MTK Budapest	34–33	26–30	30–38	31–26	24–28	26–31	27–42	30–43	0–10	26–30	—	34–25	36–30	27–35
Szombathelyi KKA	39–36	29–28	26–27	31–31	26–28	34–31	18–36	20–40	30–21	31–35	32–24	—	30–30	37–34
Vasas SC	28–27	22–28	24–39	31–30	33–35	32–28	32–37	26–40	28–29	28–34	27–26	30–33	—	27–36
Vác	32–33	25–28	23–28	39–27	29–30	28–26	24–36	26–36	26–25	31–26	39–30	32–30	25–22	—

Source: Results (Hungarian Handball Federation) (in Hungarian)
Legend: Blue = home team win; Yellow = draw; Red = away team win.
For upcoming matches, an "a" indicates there is an article about the rivalry between the two participants.

== See also ==
- 2024–25 Magyar Kupa
- 2024–25 Nemzeti Bajnokság I/B
- 2024–25 Nemzeti Bajnokság II
