= Anna Punko =

Russian handball player (born 1989)

Anna Kekezović
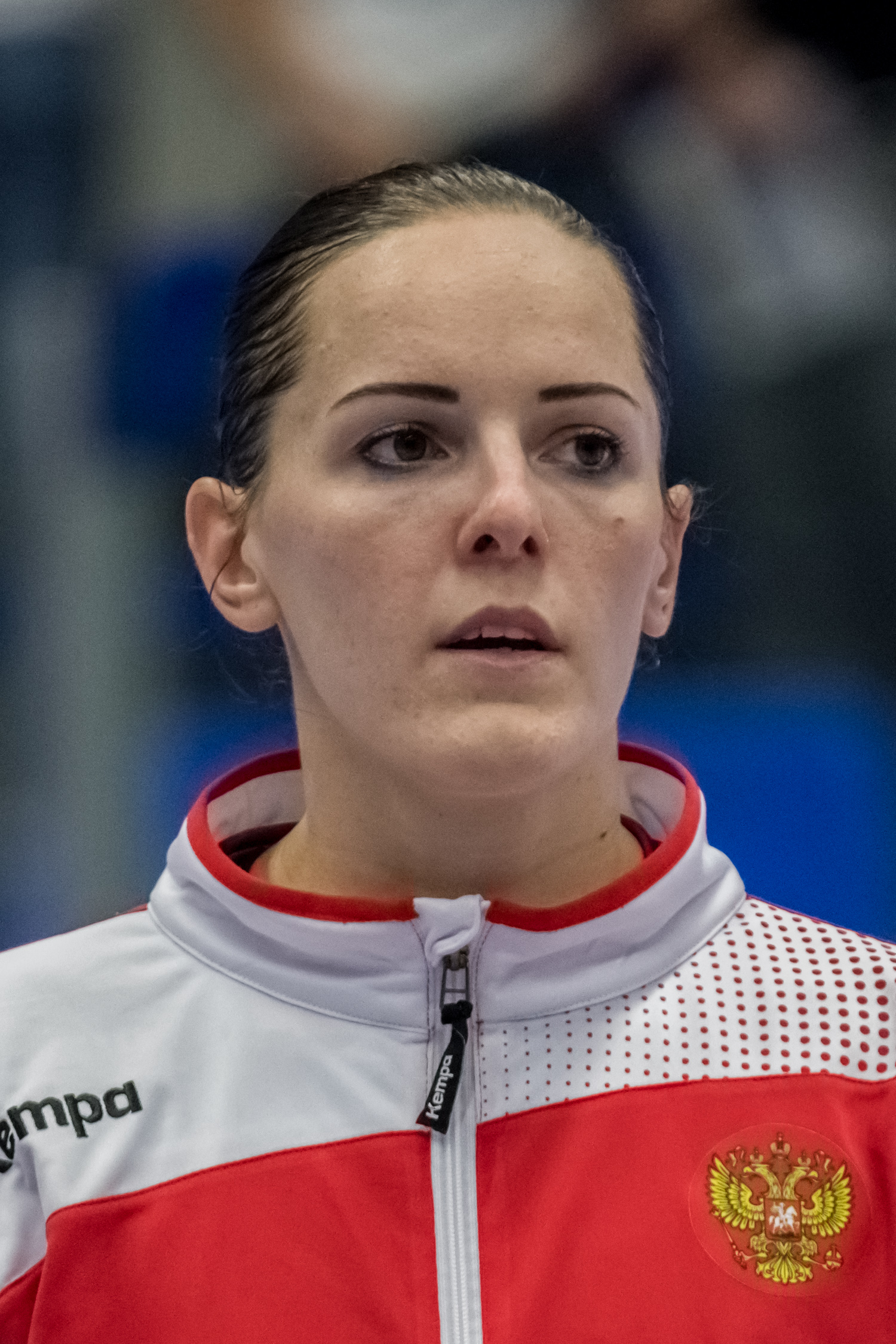

Personal information
- Nationality: Russian
- Born: 27 March 1989 (age 37) Krasnodar, Russia
- Height: 1.83 m (6 ft 0 in)

Sport
- Sport: Handball
- Position: Right back
- Current club: MTK Budapest
- Number: 10

Senior clubs
- Years: Team
- 2005–2006: Dinamo Volgograd
- 2007–2009: HC Kuban Krasnodar
- 2009–2012: BM Bera Bera
- 2012–2014: HC Kuban Krasnodar
- 2014–2016: Rostov-Don
- 2016–2019: Debreceni VSC
- 2021–: MTK Budapest
National team
Years	Team	Apps	(Gls)
–	Russia	41	(70)

Anna Kekezović (née Punko; born 27 March 1989) is a Russian handball player for MTK Budapest and the Russian national team.
