= Gréta Márton =

Hungarian handball player (born 1999)

Personal information
- Nationality: Hungarian
- Born: 3 October 1999 (age 27) Mohács, Hungary
- Height: 1.73 m (5 ft 8 in)

Sport
- Sport: Handball
- Position: Left wing
- Current club: Ferencvárosi TC
- Number: 21

Senior clubs
- Years: Team
- 2015–: Ferencvárosi TC
- 2016–2017: → MTK Budapest (loan)
National team
Years	Team	Apps	(Gls)
2019–	Hungary	114	(274)
Medal record
European Championship
Bronze medal – third place	2024 Austria/Hungary/Switzerland
Junior World Championship
Gold medal – first place	2018 Hungary
- Updated on 10 December 2025

Gréta Márton (born 3 October 1999) is a Hungarian handballer for Ferencvárosi TC and the Hungarian national team.

She made her international debut on 2 June 2019 against Austria. At the 2024 European Championship she was part of the Hungarian team that won bronze medals, losing to Norway in semifinal and beating France in the third place play-off. This was the first Hungarian medals since 2012.

== Honours ==
=== National team ===
- IHF Women's Junior World Championship:
  - Gold: 2018

=== Club ===
Ferencvárosi TC

- Champions Legague
  - Silver: 2023
- Nemzeti Bajnokság I:
  - Gold: 2021
  - Silver: 2016, 2018, 2019, 2022, 2023
- Magyar Kupa
  - Gold: 2022, 2023, 2024, 2025
  - Silver: 2019
  - Bronze: 2016, 2018, 2021

=== Individual ===
- Hungarian Handballer of the Year: 2021

== Personal life ==
In 2022 she graduated from the University of Physical Education, and earned a BA degree in Handball Coaching, then a MA degree in Physical Education in 2025.
