= 2026–27 Women's EHF European League group stage =

European handball tournament

Tournament information
- Sport: Handball
- Date: 9 January – 21 February 2027
- Teams: 16 (from 10 countries)
- Website: ehfel.com

The 2026–27 Women's EHF European League group stage is scheduled to be played between 9 January and 21 February 2027 to determine the eight teams advancing to the knockout stage of the 2026–27 Women's EHF European League.

== Draw ==
The draw took place on the 19 November 2026 at 11:00 CET in Vienna, Austria. The only restriction was that clubs from the same country cannot be in the same group.

=== Seeding ===
Source: EHF

Pot 1	Pot 2	Pot 3	Pot 4
(Denmark) Ikast Håndbold (France) JDA Bourgogne Dijon HB (Germany) Thüringer HC (Hungary) DVSC Skyline	(Croatia) RK Lokomotiva Zagreb (Spain) Malaga Costa del Sol (Romania) HC Dunărea Brăila (Sweden) IK Sävehof	(Spain) Super Amara Bera Bera (Hungary) MOL Esztergom (Norway) Tertnes Bergen (Portugal) Sport Lisboa e Benfica	(Denmark) Viborg HK (Norway) Larvik Håndballklubb (Romania) CSM Corona Brașov (Romania) SCM Ramnicu Valcea

== Format ==
In each group, teams played against each other in a double round-robin format, with home and away matches.

== Tiebreakers ==
In the group stage, teams were ranked according to points (2 points for a win, 1 point for a draw, 0 points for a loss), and if tied on points, the following tiebreaking criteria were applied, in the order given, to determine the rankings:

1. Points in matches among tied teams;
2. Goal difference in matches among tied teams;
3. Goal difference in all group matches;
4. Goals scored in all group matches;
5. If more than two teams were tied, and after applying all head-to-head criteria above, a subset of teams were still tied, all head-to-head criteria above were reapplied exclusively to this subset of teams;
6. Drawing lots.

== Groups ==
=== Group A ===
Pos	Team	Pld	W	D	L	GF	GA	GD	Pts	Qualification	IKA	BRA	AMA	LAR
1	(Denmark) Ikast Håndbold	0	0	0	0	0	0	0	0	Quarterfinals	—	–	–	–
2	(Romania) HC Dunărea Brăila	0	0	0	0	0	0	0	0	Quarterfinals	–	—	–	–
3	(Spain) Super Amara Bera Bera	0	0	0	0	0	0	0	0		–	–	—	–
4	(Norway) Larvik Håndballklubb	0	0	0	0	0	0	0	0		–	–	–	—

Updated to match(es) played on Pre-season. Source: EHF

=== Group B ===
Pos	Team	Pld	W	D	L	GF	GA	GD	Pts	Qualification	BER	DEB	ZAG	VIB
1	(Norway) Tertnes Bergen	0	0	0	0	0	0	0	0	Quarterfinals	—	–	–	–
2	(Hungary) DVSC Skyline	0	0	0	0	0	0	0	0	Quarterfinals	–	—	–	–
3	(Croatia) RK Lokomotiva Zagreb	0	0	0	0	0	0	0	0		–	–	—	–
4	(Denmark) Viborg HK	0	0	0	0	0	0	0	0		–	–	–	—

Updated to match(es) played on Pre-season. Source: EHF

=== Group C ===
Pos	Team	Pld	W	D	L	GF	GA	GD	Pts	Qualification	DIJ	MAL	ESZ	BRV
1	(France) JDA Bourgogne Dijon HB	0	0	0	0	0	0	0	0	Quarterfinals	—	–	–	–
2	(Spain) Malaga Costa del Sol	0	0	0	0	0	0	0	0	Quarterfinals	–	—	–	–
3	(Hungary) MOL Esztergom	0	0	0	0	0	0	0	0		–	–	—	–
4	(Romania) CSM Corona Brașov	0	0	0	0	0	0	0	0		–	–	–	—

Updated to match(es) played on Pre-season. Source: EHF

=== Group D ===
Pos	Team	Pld	W	D	L	GF	GA	GD	Pts	Qualification	THU	SAV	BEN	VAL
1	(Germany) Thüringer HC	0	0	0	0	0	0	0	0	Quarterfinals	—	–	–	–
2	(Sweden) IK Sävehof	0	0	0	0	0	0	0	0	Quarterfinals	–	—	–	–
3	(Portugal) Sport Lisboa e Benfica	0	0	0	0	0	0	0	0		–	–	—	–
4	(Romania) SCM Ramnicu Valcea	0	0	0	0	0	0	0	0		–	–	–	—

Updated to match(es) played on Pre-season. Source: EHF
