= Tamara Haggerty =

Dutch handball player (born 1996)

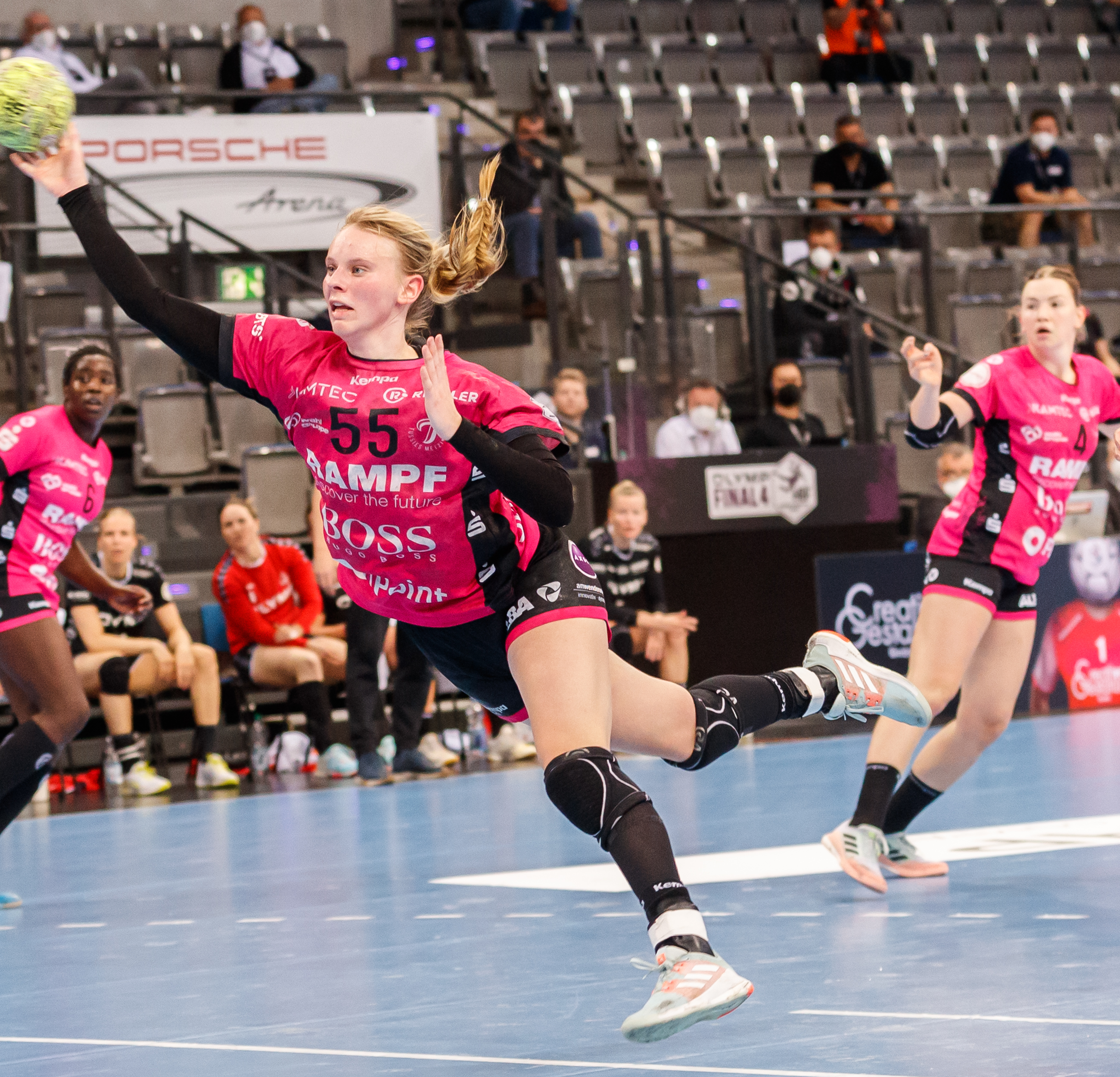
- Haggerty in 2021

Personal information
- Full name: Tamara Haggerty
- Nationality: Dutch
- Born: 29 April 1996 (age 30) Haarlem, Netherlands
- Height: 1.79 m (5 ft 10 in)

Sport
- Sport: Handball
- Position: Line player
- Current club: Debreceni VSC
- Number: 55

Senior clubs
- Years: Team
- 2012–2013: VOC Amsterdam
- 2013–2015: Westfriesland SEW
- 2015–2016: Virto/Quintus
- 2016–2018: HSG Blomberg-Lippe
- 2018–2021: TuS Metzingen
- 2021–2022: IK Sävehof
- 2022–2023: HH Elite
- 2023–2025: Debreceni VSC
- 2025–2026: Corona Brașov
- 2026–: SCM Craiova
National team
Years	Team	Apps	(Gls)
2019–	Netherlands	43	(36)
- Updated on 26 August 2025

Tamara Haggerty (born 29 April 1996) is a Dutch handball player who plays for Debreceni VSC and the Dutch national team.

She made her debut on the Dutch national team on 31 May 2019, against Russia.

She was selected as part of the Dutch 35-player squad for the 2021 World Women's Handball Championship.

== Achievements ==
- Swedish Championship:
  - Gold Medalist: 2022
- Handball-Bundesliga Frauen:
  - Bronze Medalist: 2019, 2021
- DHB-Pokal:
  - Bronze Medalist: 2019
- NHV Eredivisie Dames:
  - Silver Medalist: 2013
