= Laura Szabó =

Hungarian handball player (born 1997)

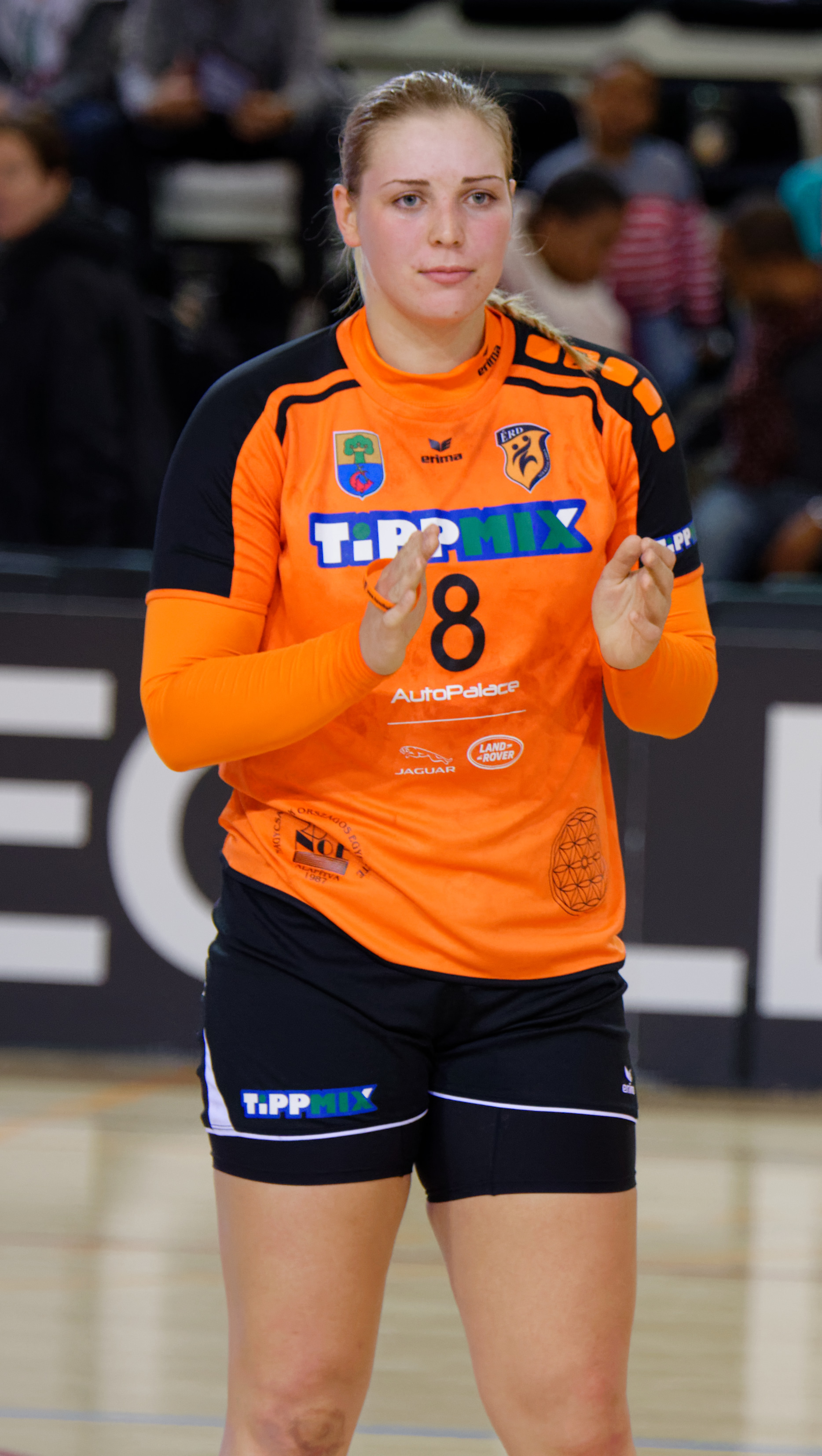
- Szabó in 2016

Personal information
- Nationality: Hungarian
- Born: 19 November 1997 (age 28) Budapest, Hungary
- Height: 1.85 m (6 ft 1 in)

Sport
- Sport: Handball
- Position: Pivot
- Current club: MTK Budapest

Youth career
- Years: Team
- –2014: Érd HC

Senior clubs
- Years: Team
- 2014–2020: Érd HC
- 2020–2021: Váci NKSE
- 2021–2023: MTK Budapest
- 2023–2026: BSV Sachsen Zwickau
- 2026–: MTK Budapest
National team
| Years | Team | Apps | (Gls) |
| 2018– | Hungary | 33 | (46) |
- Updated on 26 August 2023

Laura Szabó (born 19 November 1997) is a Hungarian handballer for MTK Budapest and the Hungarian national team.

She made her international debut on 22 March 2018 against the Netherlands.

== Achievements ==
- Magyar Kupa:
  - Finalist: 2016, 2018
