= Noémi Dakos =

Hungarian handball player (born 1991)

Personal information
- Full name: Noémi Dakos
- Nationality: Hungarian
- Born: 2 March 1991 (age 35) Debrecen, Hungary
- Height: 1.73 m (5 ft 8 in)

Sport
- Sport: Handball
- Position: Line Player
- Current club: MTK Budapest
- Number: 39

Youth career
- Years: Team
- –2008: Debreceni VSC

Senior clubs
- Years: Team
- 2008–2013: Debreceni VSC
- 2013–2016: Váci NKSE
- 2016–: MTK Budapest

Noémi Dakos (born 2 March 1991) is a Hungarian handballer who plays for MTK Budapest as a line player.

== Achievements ==
- Nemzeti Bajnokság I:
  - Silver Medallist: 2010, 2011
  - Bronze Medallist: 2009
- Magyar Kupa:
  - Silver Medallist: 2009, 2011
