= Nikolett Tóth =

Hungarian handball player (born 2001)

Personal information
- Nationality: Hungarian
- Born: 13 July 2001 (age 25) Budapest, Hungary
- Height: 1.75 m (5 ft 9 in)

Sport
- Sport: Handball
- Position: Centre back
- Current club: Debreceni VSC
- Number: 33

Youth career
- Years: Team
- 2010–2011: Óbudai Sportiskola
- 2011–2017: Ferencvárosi TC

Senior clubs
- Years: Team
- 2017–2024: (Hungary) Ferencvárosi TC
- 2017–2018: → (Hungary) Pénzügyőr SE (loan)
- 2018: → (Hungary) MTK Budapest (loan)
- 2022–2024: → (Hungary) Mosonmagyaróvári KC SE (loan)
- 2024–2025: (Hungary) Debreceni VSC
- 2025–: (Hungary) Vasas SC
National team
Years	Team	Apps	(Gls)
2024–	Hungary	11	(10)
Medal record
European Championship
Bronze medal – third place	2024 Austria/Hungary/Switzerland
Youth World Championship
Silver medal – second place	2018 Poland
Junior European Championship
Gold medal – first place	2019 Hungary
Youth European Championship
Bronze medal – third place	2017 Slovakia

Nikolett Tóth (born 13 July 2001) is a Hungarian handballer for Debreceni VSC and the Hungarian national team.

== Career ==
=== Club ===
Nikolett started her career at Óbudai Sportiskola in 2010, and from 2011 she played in the youth teams of Ferencvárosi TC. Ferencvárosi TC II made its debut in the adult second division in February 2015 in his team.

In the 2017/18 season, he also played on loan in the Nemzeti Bajnokság I/B Pénzügyőr SE team. She made her debut in the Ferencvárosi TC first team in April 2018 in Nemzeti Bajnokság I.

In the first half of the 2018–19 season, he played for MTK Budapest on loan in Nemzeti Bajnokság I. He scored 20 goals in 7 matches in the MTK Budapest team. In the spring of 2019, she also played in the EHF Champions League for Ferencvárosi TC, scoring 4 goals in 3 matches.

In the 2020/21 season, she became champion with Ferencvárosi TC, scoring 26 goals in 24 matches.

Between 2022 and 2024, she was on loan in the Mosonmagyaróvári KC SE team, with which she also played in the group stage of the EHF European League. She scored 21 goals in the 2022/23 season, and 4 goals in the 2023/24 season in the EHF European League. In 2024, she transferred to the Debreceni VSC team.

In the 2024/25 season, she scored 2 goals in 2 matches in the EHF European League. In the spring of 2025, it was announced that she would continue her career with Vasas SC from the summer.

=== National team ===
In 2017, she won a bronze medal at the Youth European Championship. In 2018, she won a silver medal at the Youth World Championships. In the final: Russia-Hungary 29–27. Nikolett scored 1 goal. In 2019, she won a gold medal at the Junior European Championship. In the final: Hungary-Netherlands 27–20. Nikolett scored 4 goals. She made her debut in the senior national team in November 2024 in Tatabánya in a warm-up match against the Slovak national team, but did not score a goal. She also participated in the 2024 European Women's Handball Championship, where the Hungarian team finished 3rd (9 matches / 8 goals). This was the first Hungarian medals since 2012.

== Honours ==
=== National team ===
- European Women's Handball Championship:
  - Bronze: 2024
- Junior European Championship:
  - Gold: 2019
- IHF Youth World Championship:
  - Silver: 2018
- Youth European Championship:
  - Bronze: 2017

=== Club ===
Ferencvárosi TC

- Nemzeti Bajnokság I:
  - Gold: 2021
  - Silver: 2019, 2022
- Magyar Kupa
  - Gold: 2022
  - Silver: 2019
  - Bronze: 2021

Mosonmagyaróvári KC SE

- Nemzeti Bajnokság I:
  - Bronze: 2024
