= Vivien Grosch =

Hungarian handball player (born 1997)

Personal information
- Nationality: Hungarian
- Born: 17 April 1997 (age 29) Budapest, Hungary
- Height: 1.68 m (5 ft 6 in)

Sport
- Sport: Handball
- Position: Right wing
- Current club: Debreceni VSC
- Number: 18

Youth career
- Years: Team
- 2010–2011: Dunaújvárosi VSI
- 2011–2012: Dunaújvárosi KKA

Senior clubs
- Years: Team
- 2012–2020: Dunaújvárosi KKA
- 2020–2022: Váci NKSE
- 2022–2023: MTK Budapest
- 2023–: Debreceni VSC
National team
Years	Team	Apps	(Gls)
2024–	Hungary	9	(15)
- Updated on 10 December 2025

Vivien Grosch (born 17 April 1997) is a Hungarian handballer for Debreceni VSC and the Hungary national team.

== Career ==
=== Club ===
Vivien started her career at Dunaújvárosi VSI in 2010. In 2011, she signed for Dunaújvárosi KKA. She made her debut for Dunaújvárosi KKA first team in the Nemzeti Bajnokság I in the fall of 2012. Until 2016, she played a few times in the senior team in the Nemzeti Bajnokság I, and from 2016 she was only considered a first-team player, until then she played in the youth teams of Dunaújvárosi KKA. She also made her debut with the team in the EHF Cup in the 2016/2017 season. In the summer of 2020, she transferred to the Váci NKSE team starting in the EHF European League. She transferred to MTK Budapest in 2022. In the summer of 2023, she transferred to the Debreceni VSC team starting in the EHF Champions League. She scored 17 goals in the EHF Champions League.

=== National team ===
He was 9th with the Hungarian team at the 2013 Youth European Championship. She was included in the large squad of the 2023 World Women's Handball Championship, but in the end he will not become a member of the narrow squad. She made her debut for the Hungarian women's adult national team in Toulon in October 2024 in a warm-up match against the France women's national handball team, in which she scored 2 goals: France-Hungary 27–30. He was included in the large squad of the 2024 European Women's Handball Championship, but in the end he will not become a member of the narrow squad.

== Personal life ==
Her cousin, Katrin Klujber, is also a professional handballer. They are both part of the national team's extended squad.
