= Ines Ivančok =

Austrian handballer (born 2001)

Ines Ivančok-Šoltić
Personal information
- Nationality: Austrian
- Born: 14 April 1998 (age 28) Vienna, Austria
- Height: 1.82 m (6 ft 0 in)

Sport
- Sport: Handball
- Position: Left back
- Current club: Debreceni VSC
- Number: 14

Senior clubs
- Years: Team
- –2017: MGA Fivers
- 2017–2019: HB Ludwigsburg
- 2019–2022: HSG Bensheim/Auerbach
- 2022–2025: Mosonmagyaróvári KC SE
- 2025: Szombathelyi KKA
- 2025–: Debreceni VSC
National team
Years	Team	Apps	(Gls)
2015–	Austria	83	(295)
- Updated on 6 November 2025

Ines Ivančok-Šoltić (born 14 April 1998) is an Austrian handballer for Debreceni VSC and the Austrian national team.

She represented Austria at the 2021 World Women's Handball Championship, placing 16th and the 2023 World Women's Handball Championship, placing 19th.

== Private ==
Her sister, Lena Ivančok is also a handball player.
