= Jessica Ryde =

Swedish handball player (born 1994)

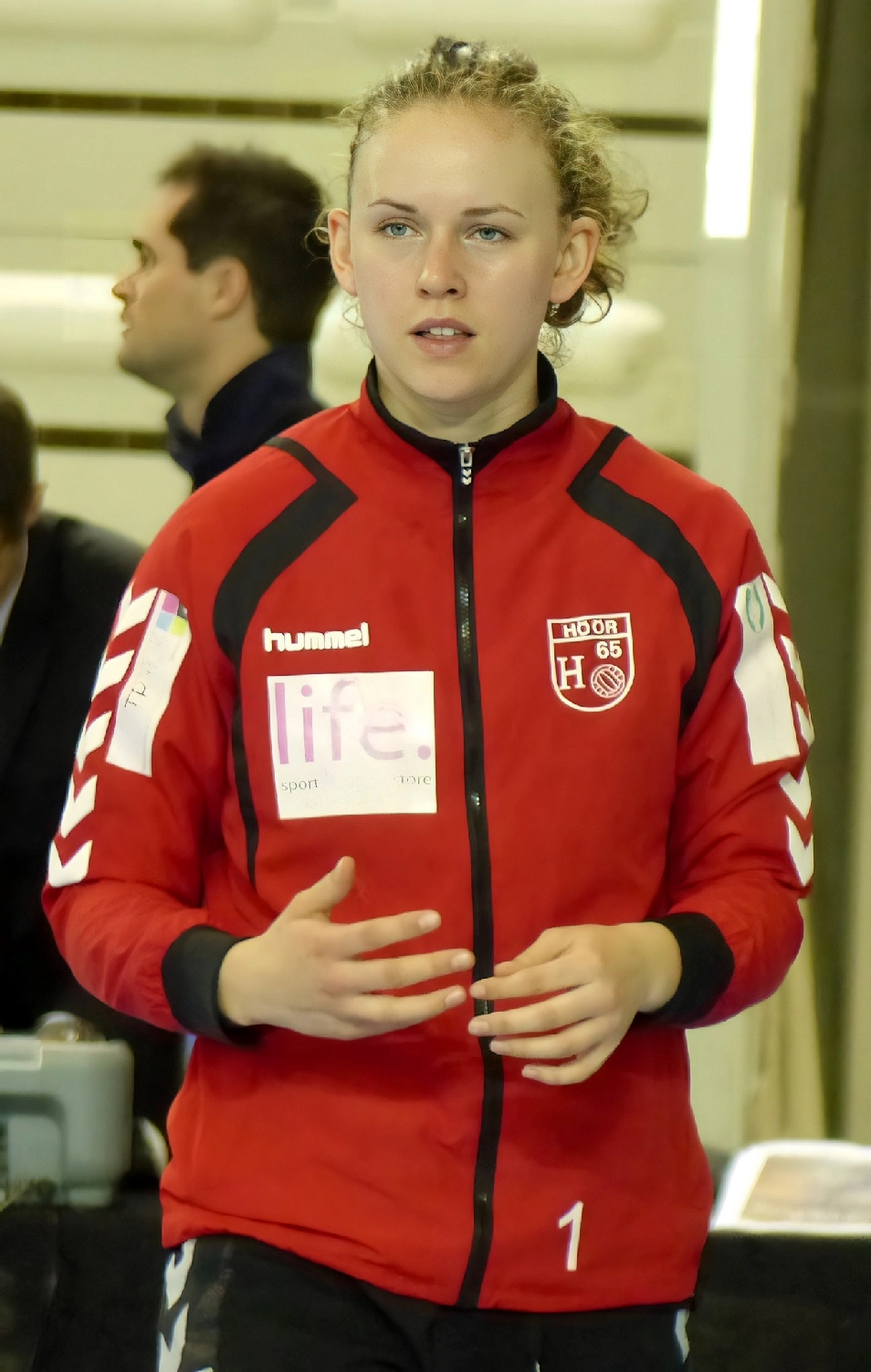
- Jessica Ryde in 2014

Personal information
- Full name: Jessica Karin Maria Ryde
- Nationality: Swedish
- Born: 18 May 1994 (age 32) Lund, Sweden
- Height: 1.85 m (6 ft 1 in)

Sport
- Sport: Handball
- Position: Goalkeeper
- Current club: DVSC Schaeffler

Senior clubs
- Years: Team
- 2010–2013: Lugi HF
- 2013–2017: H 65 Höör
- 2017–2023: Herning-Ikast
- 2023–2024: Neptunes de Nantes
- 2024–: DVSC Schaeffler
National team
Years	Team	Apps	(Gls)
2018–	Sweden	66	(0)

Jessica Ryde (born 18 May 1994) is a Swedish handball player for DVSC Schaeffler and the Swedish national team.

She represented Sweden at the 2020 European Women's Handball Championship.

== Achievements ==
- EHF European League:
  - Winner: 2023
- Swedish Elitserien:
  - Winner: 2017
- EHF Challenge Cup:
  - Winner: 2014
