= MTK Budapest (women's handball) =

Hungarian handball club

- Full name: Magyar Testgyakorlók Köre Budapest
- Short name: MTK
- Arena: Riz Levente Sport- és Rendezvényközpont, Budapest
- Capacity: 1,500
- Head coach: dr. Péter Woth
- League: Nemzeti Bajnokság I
- 2021–22: Nemzeti Bajnokság I, 8th
- Club colours
Home	Away

MTK Budapest is a Hungarian women's handball team from Budapest, that is part of the multi-sports club MTK Budapest. The team plays in the Nemzeti Bajnokság I, the top level championship in Hungary.

== Kits ==
HOME
2016–17	2017–18	2018–19	2019–20	2020–21	2021–22	2022–23	2023–24

AWAY
2013–14	2016–17	2018–19	2019–20	2020–21	2021–22; 2023–24	2022–23

THIRD
2013–14	2016–18	2021–22	2022–23	2023–24

== Team ==
=== Current squad ===
Squad for the 2026–27 season

- Head coach: dr. Péter Woth
- Goalkeeping coach: Péter Rutka
- Doctor: István Tatai, MD
- Masseur: Dániel Sándor

Goalkeepers

- 1 (Hungary) Alexa Wéninger
- 9 (Hungary) Szofi Imre
- 45 (Hungary) Réka Lakatos

Right wingers

- 25 (Hungary) Kitti Miklós
- 67 (Hungary) Dorottya Molnár

Left wingers

- 22 (Hungary) Kíra Oláh
- 20 (Hungary) Krisztina Berei

Line players

- 39 (Hungary) Noémi Dakos (c)
- 8 (Hungary) Laura Szabó

Back players
Left backs

- 4 (Hungary) Virág Bánfai
- 21 (Hungary) Fanni Bujdosó-Gerháth
- 23 (Hungary) Bianka Boldizsár

Centre backs

- 11 (Hungary) Fruzsina Ferenczy
- 24 (Hungary) Lili Bucsi
- 27 (Hungary) Aida Kurucz

Right backs

- 28 (Slovakia) Barbora Lancz

=== Transfers ===
Transfers for the 2026–27 season

Joining

- (Hungary) Dorottya Molnár (RW) from (Hungary) Mosonmagyaróvári KC SE
- (Hungary) Kíra Oláh (LW) from (Hungary) Vasas SC
- (Hungary) Aida Kurucz (CB) from (Hungary) Váci NKSE
- (Hungary) Krisztina Berei (LW) from (Hungary) National Academy of Handball
- (Hungary) Laura Szabó (LP) from (Germany) BSV Sachsen Zwickau
- (Hungary) Alexa Wéninger (GK) from (Hungary) Szigetszentmiklós

Leaving

- (Hungary) Bozsana Fekete (LW)
- (Hungary) Luca Dombi (LP) to (Hungary) National Academy of Handball
- (Hungary) Dalma Domokos (RW)
- (Hungary) Lili Bató (CB)
- (Hungary) Laura Lapos (LB)
- (Hungary) Melinda Tóth (LW)
- (Hungary) (Serbia) Molli Kubina (GK) to (Serbia) ŽRK Crvena zvezda

== Coaches ==
- (Ukraine) (Hungary) Vlagyimir Golovin (2015–2021)
- (Hungary) Gergő Vida (2021–2022)
- (Serbia) (Hungary) Marinko Kekezović (2022; 2024)
- (Hungary) Attila Vágó (2022–2024)
- (Hungary) dr. Péter Woth (2024–)

== European record ==
=== EHF European League ===
Season	Competition	Round	Club	1st leg	2nd leg	Aggregate
2021–22	EHF European League	Round 2	(Turkey) Yalikavaksports Club	39–30	33–24	72–54
2021–22	EHF European League	Round 3	(Denmark) Herning-Ikast Håndbold	27–34	29–34	56–68

== Notable players ==
- (Hungary) Gréta Márton
- (Hungary) Noémi Háfra
- (Hungary) Petra Simon
- (Hungary) Alexandra Wolf
- (Hungary) Eszter Tóth
- (Hungary) Nikolett Tóth
- (Hungary) Éva Barna
- (Hungary) Vivien Víg
- (Hungary) Nóra Valovics
- (Hungary) Csilla Németh
- (Hungary) Luca Szekerczés
- (Hungary) Szandra Szöllősi-Zácsik
- (Hungary) Fruzsina Dávid-Azari
- (Austria) Petra Blazek
- (Tunisia) Ines Khouildi
- (Croatia) Lana Frankovic
- (Croatia) Petra Marinovic
- (Ukraine) Liliia Gorilska
- (Ukraine) Olha Nikolayenko
- (Belarus) Elena Abramovich
- (Slovakia) Martina Baciková
- (Montenegro) Djurdjina Malovic
- (Germany) Saskia Weisheitel
