= 2023–24 Women's EHF Champions League group stage =

Group of sport event

The 2023–24 Women's EHF Champions League group stage was played between 9 September 2023 and 18 February 2024 to determine the twelve teams advancing to the knockout stage of the 2023–24 Women's EHF Champions League.

== Draw ==
The draw was held on 27 June 2023 in Vienna, Austria.

=== Seeding ===
The composition of the seeding pots for the group stage draw was announced on 20 June 2023.

Pot 1	Pot 2	Pot 3	Pot 4
(Norway) Vipers Kristiansand (Hungary) Győri Audi ETO KC (France) Metz Handball (Denmark) Team Esbjerg (Romania) CSM București	(Hungary) FTC-Rail Cargo Hungaria (France) Brest Bretagne Handball (Denmark) Odense Håndbold (Romania) CS Rapid București	(Slovenia) RK Krim Mercator (Montenegro) WHC Budućnost BEMAX (Germany) SG BBM Bietigheim (Sweden) IK Sävehof (Poland) MKS Zagłębie Lubin	(Denmark) Ikast Håndbold (Hungary) DVSC Schaeffler

== Format ==
In each group, teams played against each other in a double round-robin format, with home and away matches.

== Tiebreakers ==
In the group stage, teams were ranked according to points (2 points for a win, 1 point for a draw, 0 points for a loss). After completion of the group stage, if two or more teams have the same number of points, the ranking was determined as follows:

1. Highest number of points in matches between the teams directly involved;
2. Superior goal difference in matches between the teams directly involved;
3. Highest number of goals scored in matches between the teams directly involved;
4. Superior goal difference in all matches of the group;
5. Highest number of plus goals in all matches of the group;

If the ranking of one of these teams is determined, the above criteria are consecutively followed until the ranking of all teams is determined. If no ranking can be determined, a decision shall be obtained by EHF through drawing of lots.

== Groups ==
The matchdays were 9–10 September, 16–17 September, 23–24 September, 30 September – 1 October, 21–22 October, 28–29 October, 11–12 November, 18–19 November 2023, 6–7 January, 13–14 January, 20–21 February, 3–4 February, 10–11 February, and 17–18 February 2024.

Times until 28 October 2023 are UTC+2, from 29 October 2023 on UTC+1.

=== Group A ===
Pos	Team	Pld	W	D	L	GF	GA	GD	Pts	Qualification
1	(Hungary) Győri Audi ETO KC	14	11	1	2	432	356	+76	23	Quarterfinals
2	(Denmark) Odense Håndbold	14	10	1	3	461	359	+102	21	Quarterfinals
3	(France) Brest Bretagne Handball	14	7	3	4	399	367	+32	17 (Note: Brest 54–49 București)	Playoffs
4	(Romania) CSM București	14	8	1	5	414	366	+48	17	Playoffs
5	(Hungary) DVSC Schaeffler	14	7	1	6	394	414	−20	15	Playoffs
6	(Germany) SG BBM Bietigheim	14	7	0	7	414	402	+12	14	Playoffs
7	(Montenegro) WHC Budućnost BEMAX	14	2	1	11	311	433	−122	5	
8	(Sweden) IK Sävehof	14	0	0	14	342	470	−128	0	

Source: EHF
Rules for classification: Tiebreakers
Notes:

9 September 2023; 18:00	CSM București (Romania)	28–24	(Denmark) Odense Håndbold	Polyvalent Hall, Bucharest; Attendance: 4,000; Referees: Praštalo, Balvan (BIH)
9 September 2023; 18:00	Neagu 8	(16–10)	Aardahl 7	Polyvalent Hall, Bucharest; Attendance: 4,000; Referees: Praštalo, Balvan (BIH)
9 September 2023; 18:00	3× (suspension)	Report	2× (suspension)	Polyvalent Hall, Bucharest; Attendance: 4,000; Referees: Praštalo, Balvan (BIH)

9 September 2023; 18:00	DVSC Schaeffler (Hungary)	32–29	(Sweden) IK Sävehof	Hódos Imre Sportcsarnok, Debrecen; Attendance: 1,500; Referees: Backović, Palačković (SLO)
9 September 2023; 18:00	Vámos 6	(18–13)	four players 5	Hódos Imre Sportcsarnok, Debrecen; Attendance: 1,500; Referees: Backović, Palačković (SLO)
9 September 2023; 18:00	1× (yellow card) 4× (suspension)	Report	5× (suspension)	Hódos Imre Sportcsarnok, Debrecen; Attendance: 1,500; Referees: Backović, Palačković (SLO)

10 September 2023; 14:00	WHC Budućnost BEMAX (Montenegro)	22–27	(Germany) SG BBM Bietigheim	Morača Sports Center, Podgorica; Attendance: 900; Referees: Gasmi, Gasmi (FRA)
10 September 2023; 14:00	Raičević 5	(10–11)	Kudłacz-Gloc 7	Morača Sports Center, Podgorica; Attendance: 900; Referees: Gasmi, Gasmi (FRA)
10 September 2023; 14:00	4× (suspension)	Report	1× (yellow card) 2× (suspension)	Morača Sports Center, Podgorica; Attendance: 900; Referees: Gasmi, Gasmi (FRA)

10 September 2023; 16:00	Brest Bretagne Handball (France)	23–24	(Hungary) Győri Audi ETO KC	Brest Arena, Brest; Attendance: 3,552; Referees: Braseth, Sundet (NOR)
10 September 2023; 16:00	Maslova 6	(14–16)	Gros 6	Brest Arena, Brest; Attendance: 3,552; Referees: Braseth, Sundet (NOR)
10 September 2023; 16:00	1× (suspension)	Report	4× (suspension)	Brest Arena, Brest; Attendance: 3,552; Referees: Braseth, Sundet (NOR)

16 September 2023; 16:00	Győri Audi ETO KC (Hungary)	35–23	(Hungary) DVSC Schaeffler	Audi Aréna, Győr; Attendance: 3,094; Referees: Antić, Jakovljević (SRB)
16 September 2023; 16:00	Hovden 6	(14–10)	Jovović, Csernyánszki 4	Audi Aréna, Győr; Attendance: 3,094; Referees: Antić, Jakovljević (SRB)
16 September 2023; 16:00	3× (suspension)	Report	1× (yellow card) 3× (suspension)	Audi Aréna, Győr; Attendance: 3,094; Referees: Antić, Jakovljević (SRB)

16 September 2023; 16:00	IK Sävehof (Sweden)	20–25	(France) Brest Bretagne Handball	Partille Arena, Partille; Attendance: 1,200; Referees: Lidacka, Lesiak (POL)
16 September 2023; 16:00	Kylberg, Mihailovic 4	(9–15)	Maslova 5	Partille Arena, Partille; Attendance: 1,200; Referees: Lidacka, Lesiak (POL)
16 September 2023; 16:00	1× (yellow card) 3× (suspension)	Report	1× (yellow card) 1× (suspension)	Partille Arena, Partille; Attendance: 1,200; Referees: Lidacka, Lesiak (POL)

16 September 2023; 18:00	Odense Håndbold (Denmark)	39–24	(Montenegro) WHC Budućnost BEMAX	Sydbank Arena Odense, Odense; Attendance: 1,973; Referees: Duplii, Pobedrina (UKR)
16 September 2023; 18:00	Van Wetering 6	(25–8)	Kadović, Raičević 5	Sydbank Arena Odense, Odense; Attendance: 1,973; Referees: Duplii, Pobedrina (UKR)
16 September 2023; 18:00	2× (yellow card) 5× (suspension)	Report	3× (suspension)	Sydbank Arena Odense, Odense; Attendance: 1,973; Referees: Duplii, Pobedrina (UKR)

17 September 2023; 14:00	SG BBM Bietigheim (Germany)	26–24	(Romania) CSM București	Arena Ludwigsburg, Ludwigsburg; Attendance: 1,753; Referees: Doychinov, Goretsov (BUL)
17 September 2023; 14:00	X. Smits 7	(14–12)	Neagu 5	Arena Ludwigsburg, Ludwigsburg; Attendance: 1,753; Referees: Doychinov, Goretsov (BUL)
17 September 2023; 14:00	1× (yellow card) 4× (suspension)	Report	1× (suspension)	Arena Ludwigsburg, Ludwigsburg; Attendance: 1,753; Referees: Doychinov, Goretsov (BUL)

23 September 2023; 16:00	CSM București (Romania)	23–27	(Hungary) Győri Audi ETO KC	Polyvalent Hall, Bucharest; Attendance: 3,500; Referees: Merz, Kuttler (GER)
23 September 2023; 16:00	Neagu 5	(11–14)	Brattset Dale 7	Polyvalent Hall, Bucharest; Attendance: 3,500; Referees: Merz, Kuttler (GER)
23 September 2023; 16:00	2× (yellow card) 2× (suspension)	Report	1× (yellow card) 1× (suspension)	Polyvalent Hall, Bucharest; Attendance: 3,500; Referees: Merz, Kuttler (GER)

24 September 2023; 14:00	WHC Budućnost BEMAX (Montenegro)	31–30	(Sweden) IK Sävehof	Morača Sports Center, Podgorica; Attendance: 1,000; Referees: Bolic, Hurich (AUT)
24 September 2023; 14:00	Godeč 6	(17–16)	Jensen 6	Morača Sports Center, Podgorica; Attendance: 1,000; Referees: Bolic, Hurich (AUT)
24 September 2023; 14:00	1× (yellow card)	Report	1× (suspension)	Morača Sports Center, Podgorica; Attendance: 1,000; Referees: Bolic, Hurich (AUT)

24 September 2023; 14:00	DVSC Schaeffler (Hungary)	26–36	(Germany) SG BBM Bietigheim	Hódos Imre Sportcsarnok, Debrecen; Attendance: 2,000; Referees: Budzák, Záhradník (SVK)
24 September 2023; 14:00	Töpfner 5	(12–18)	X. Smits 8	Hódos Imre Sportcsarnok, Debrecen; Attendance: 2,000; Referees: Budzák, Záhradník (SVK)
24 September 2023; 14:00	9× (suspension)	Report	1× (yellow card) 6× (suspension)	Hódos Imre Sportcsarnok, Debrecen; Attendance: 2,000; Referees: Budzák, Záhradník (SVK)

24 September 2023; 16:00	Brest Bretagne Handball (France)	25–26	(Denmark) Odense Håndbold	Brest Arena, Brest; Attendance: 3,510; Referees: Sekulić, Jovandić (SRB)
24 September 2023; 16:00	Maslova 5	(11–13)	Deila 8	Brest Arena, Brest; Attendance: 3,510; Referees: Sekulić, Jovandić (SRB)
24 September 2023; 16:00	1× (yellow card) 2× (suspension)	Report	2× (yellow card) 5× (suspension)	Brest Arena, Brest; Attendance: 3,510; Referees: Sekulić, Jovandić (SRB)

30 September 2023; 16:00	Odense Håndbold (Denmark)	33–30	(Hungary) DVSC Schaeffler	Sydbank Arena Odense, Odense; Attendance: 1,987; Referees: Braseth, Sundet (NOR)
30 September 2023; 16:00	Aardahl 7	(17–14)	Kácsor 10	Sydbank Arena Odense, Odense; Attendance: 1,987; Referees: Braseth, Sundet (NOR)
30 September 2023; 16:00	1× (yellow card) 6× (suspension) 1× (red card)	Report	1× (yellow card) 6× (suspension)	Sydbank Arena Odense, Odense; Attendance: 1,987; Referees: Braseth, Sundet (NOR)

30 September 2023; 16:00	SG BBM Bietigheim (Germany)	34–30	(France) Brest Bretagne Handball	Arena Ludwigsburg, Ludwigsburg; Attendance: 1,651; Referees: Backović, Palačković (SLO)
30 September 2023; 16:00	Kudłacz-Gloc 14	(17–16)	Lassource 8	Arena Ludwigsburg, Ludwigsburg; Attendance: 1,651; Referees: Backović, Palačković (SLO)
30 September 2023; 16:00	1× (yellow card) 3× (suspension)	Report	2× (yellow card) 4× (suspension) 1× (red card)	Arena Ludwigsburg, Ludwigsburg; Attendance: 1,651; Referees: Backović, Palačković (SLO)

1 October 2023; 14:00	IK Sävehof (Sweden)	26–41	(Romania) CSM București	Partille Arena, Partille; Attendance: 1,215; Referees: Duplii, Pobedrina (UKR)
1 October 2023; 14:00	four players 4	(11–22)	Arntzen, Ingstad 6	Partille Arena, Partille; Attendance: 1,215; Referees: Duplii, Pobedrina (UKR)
1 October 2023; 14:00	3× (suspension)	Report	1× (suspension)	Partille Arena, Partille; Attendance: 1,215; Referees: Duplii, Pobedrina (UKR)

1 October 2023; 16:00	Győri Audi ETO KC (Hungary)	37–19	(Montenegro) WHC Budućnost BEMAX	Audi Aréna, Győr; Attendance: 3,791; Referees: Sirbu, Serdiuc (MDA)
1 October 2023; 16:00	Gros 9	(23–8)	Raičević 4	Audi Aréna, Győr; Attendance: 3,791; Referees: Sirbu, Serdiuc (MDA)
1 October 2023; 16:00	2× (suspension)	Report	1× (yellow card) 2× (suspension)	Audi Aréna, Győr; Attendance: 3,791; Referees: Sirbu, Serdiuc (MDA)

21 October 2023; 16:00	CSM București (Romania)	28–30	(France) Brest Bretagne Handball	Polyvalent Hall, Bucharest; Attendance: 2,000; Referees: Petrušis, Barysas (LTU)
21 October 2023; 16:00	Neagu 8	(16–17)	Maslova, Toublanc 7	Polyvalent Hall, Bucharest; Attendance: 2,000; Referees: Petrušis, Barysas (LTU)
21 October 2023; 16:00	3× (suspension)	Report	1× (yellow card) 5× (suspension)	Polyvalent Hall, Bucharest; Attendance: 2,000; Referees: Petrušis, Barysas (LTU)

21 October 2023; 16:00	DVSC Schaeffler (Hungary)	27–22	(Montenegro) WHC Budućnost BEMAX	Hódos Imre Sportcsarnok, Debrecen; Attendance: 1,700; Referees: Konjičanin, Konjičanin (BIH)
21 October 2023; 16:00	Töpfner 10	(12–10)	three players 5	Hódos Imre Sportcsarnok, Debrecen; Attendance: 1,700; Referees: Konjičanin, Konjičanin (BIH)
21 October 2023; 16:00	1× (yellow card) 4× (suspension)	Report	1× (yellow card) 7× (suspension)	Hódos Imre Sportcsarnok, Debrecen; Attendance: 1,700; Referees: Konjičanin, Konjičanin (BIH)

21 October 2023; 18:00	Győri Audi ETO KC (Hungary)	32–29	(Denmark) Odense Håndbold	Audi Aréna, Győr; Attendance: 5,007; Referees: Doychinov, Goretsov (BUL)
21 October 2023; 18:00	Oftedal 10	(16–12)	Halilcevic, Aardahl 6	Audi Aréna, Győr; Attendance: 5,007; Referees: Doychinov, Goretsov (BUL)
21 October 2023; 18:00	1× (suspension)	Report	4× (suspension)	Audi Aréna, Győr; Attendance: 5,007; Referees: Doychinov, Goretsov (BUL)

22 October 2023; 14:00	SG BBM Bietigheim (Germany)	30–21	(Sweden) IK Sävehof	Arena Ludwigsburg, Ludwigsburg; Attendance: 821; Referees: Braseth, Sundet (NOR)
22 October 2023; 14:00	Kudłacz-Gloc 6	(16–7)	Mellegård 5	Arena Ludwigsburg, Ludwigsburg; Attendance: 821; Referees: Braseth, Sundet (NOR)
22 October 2023; 14:00	2× (suspension)	Report	2× (suspension)	Arena Ludwigsburg, Ludwigsburg; Attendance: 821; Referees: Braseth, Sundet (NOR)

28 October 2023; 16:00	DVSC Schaeffler (Hungary)	31–24	(France) Brest Bretagne Handball	Hódos Imre Sportcsarnok, Debrecen; Attendance: 1,500; Referees: Covalciuc, Covalciuc (MDA)
28 October 2023; 16:00	Töpfner 7	(15–14)	Maslova 9	Hódos Imre Sportcsarnok, Debrecen; Attendance: 1,500; Referees: Covalciuc, Covalciuc (MDA)
28 October 2023; 16:00	1× (yellow card) 4× (suspension)	Report	1× (suspension)	Hódos Imre Sportcsarnok, Debrecen; Attendance: 1,500; Referees: Covalciuc, Covalciuc (MDA)

29 October 2023; 14:00	IK Sävehof (Sweden)	26–29	(Hungary) Győri Audi ETO KC	Partille Arena, Partille; Attendance: 1,047; Referees: Bočáková, Jánošíková (SVK)
29 October 2023; 14:00	Koppang 7	(8–13)	four players 5	Partille Arena, Partille; Attendance: 1,047; Referees: Bočáková, Jánošíková (SVK)
29 October 2023; 14:00	1× (suspension)	Report	1× (yellow card) 5× (suspension)	Partille Arena, Partille; Attendance: 1,047; Referees: Bočáková, Jánošíková (SVK)

29 October 2023; 16:00	Odense Håndbold (Denmark)	42–29	(Germany) SG BBM Bietigheim	Sydbank Arena Odense, Odense; Attendance: 2,236; Referees: Lah, Sok (SLO)
29 October 2023; 16:00	Aardahl 8	(18–14)	Döll 6	Sydbank Arena Odense, Odense; Attendance: 2,236; Referees: Lah, Sok (SLO)
29 October 2023; 16:00	3× (yellow card) 5× (suspension)	Report	1× (yellow card) 4× (suspension)	Sydbank Arena Odense, Odense; Attendance: 2,236; Referees: Lah, Sok (SLO)

29 October 2023; 16:00	WHC Budućnost BEMAX (Montenegro)	24–29	(Romania) CSM București	Morača Sports Center, Podgorica; Attendance: 1,100; Referees: Metalari, Nikolovski (MKD)
29 October 2023; 16:00	J. Vukčević 7	(12–17)	three players 6	Morača Sports Center, Podgorica; Attendance: 1,100; Referees: Metalari, Nikolovski (MKD)
29 October 2023; 16:00	1× (yellow card) 2× (suspension)	Report	4× (suspension)	Morača Sports Center, Podgorica; Attendance: 1,100; Referees: Metalari, Nikolovski (MKD)

11 November 2023; 16:00	IK Sävehof (Sweden)	20–44	(Denmark) Odense Håndbold	Partille Arena, Partille; Attendance: 940; Referees: Ilieva, Karbeska (MKD)
11 November 2023; 16:00	Blomst 4	(11–21)	Halilcevic 9	Partille Arena, Partille; Attendance: 940; Referees: Ilieva, Karbeska (MKD)
11 November 2023; 16:00	1× (yellow card) 5× (suspension)	Report	1× (yellow card) 2× (suspension)	Partille Arena, Partille; Attendance: 940; Referees: Ilieva, Karbeska (MKD)

11 November 2023; 18:00	CSM București (Romania)	29–29	(Hungary) DVSC Schaeffler	Polyvalent Hall, Bucharest; Attendance: 2,500; Referees: Carmaux, Mursch (FRA)
11 November 2023; 18:00	Neagu 9	(17–14)	Vámos 7	Polyvalent Hall, Bucharest; Attendance: 2,500; Referees: Carmaux, Mursch (FRA)
11 November 2023; 18:00	3× (suspension)	Report	2× (suspension)	Polyvalent Hall, Bucharest; Attendance: 2,500; Referees: Carmaux, Mursch (FRA)

11 November 2023; 18:00	Brest Bretagne Handball (France)	20–20	(Montenegro) WHC Budućnost BEMAX	Brest Arena, Brest; Attendance: 3,600; Referees: Lovin, Stancu (ROU)
11 November 2023; 18:00	Maslova 6	(9–9)	Godeč 6	Brest Arena, Brest; Attendance: 3,600; Referees: Lovin, Stancu (ROU)
11 November 2023; 18:00	2× (yellow card) 3× (suspension) 1× (red card)	Report	5× (suspension)	Brest Arena, Brest; Attendance: 3,600; Referees: Lovin, Stancu (ROU)

11 November 2023; 20:00	SG BBM Bietigheim (Germany)	26–34	(Hungary) Győri Audi ETO KC	Arena Ludwigsburg, Ludwigsburg; Attendance: 3,043; Referees: Vujačić, Kažanegra (MNE)
11 November 2023; 20:00	Gassama, Hvenfelt 4	(10–12)	Nze Minko 7	Arena Ludwigsburg, Ludwigsburg; Attendance: 3,043; Referees: Vujačić, Kažanegra (MNE)
11 November 2023; 20:00	1× (yellow card) 4× (suspension)	Report	1× (yellow card) 3× (suspension)	Arena Ludwigsburg, Ludwigsburg; Attendance: 3,043; Referees: Vujačić, Kažanegra (MNE)

18 November 2023; 16:00	Odense Håndbold (Denmark)	40–22	(Sweden) IK Sävehof	Sydbank Arena Odense, Odense; Attendance: 2,102; Referees: Christidi, Papamattheou (GRE)
18 November 2023; 16:00	Halilcevic 7	(21–11)	Koppang, Mellegård 3	Sydbank Arena Odense, Odense; Attendance: 2,102; Referees: Christidi, Papamattheou (GRE)
18 November 2023; 16:00	2× (suspension)	Report	4× (suspension)	Sydbank Arena Odense, Odense; Attendance: 2,102; Referees: Christidi, Papamattheou (GRE)

18 November 2023; 16:00	DVSC Schaeffler (Hungary)	23–30	(Romania) CSM București	Hódos Imre Sportcsarnok, Debrecen; Attendance: 2,200; Referees: Hatipoğlu, Şimşek (TUR)
18 November 2023; 16:00	Planéta 6	(9–15)	Stoica 8	Hódos Imre Sportcsarnok, Debrecen; Attendance: 2,200; Referees: Hatipoğlu, Şimşek (TUR)
18 November 2023; 16:00	1× (yellow card) 4× (suspension)	Report	1× (yellow card) 5× (suspension)	Hódos Imre Sportcsarnok, Debrecen; Attendance: 2,200; Referees: Hatipoğlu, Şimşek (TUR)

18 November 2023; 18:00	Győri Audi ETO KC (Hungary)	31–29	(Germany) SG BBM Bietigheim	Audi Aréna, Győr; Attendance: 4,612; Referees: Petrušis, Barysas (LTU)
18 November 2023; 18:00	De Paula 8	(13–17)	Kudłacz-Gloc, X. Smits 5	Audi Aréna, Győr; Attendance: 4,612; Referees: Petrušis, Barysas (LTU)
18 November 2023; 18:00	1× (suspension)	Report	2× (yellow card) 3× (suspension)	Audi Aréna, Győr; Attendance: 4,612; Referees: Petrušis, Barysas (LTU)

18 November 2023; 18:00	WHC Budućnost BEMAX (Montenegro)	21–34	(France) Brest Bretagne Handball	Morača Sports Center, Podgorica; Attendance: 1,200; Referees: Doychinov, Goretsov (BUL)
18 November 2023; 18:00	Ivanović 6	(10–19)	Maslova 6	Morača Sports Center, Podgorica; Attendance: 1,200; Referees: Doychinov, Goretsov (BUL)
18 November 2023; 18:00	4× (suspension)	Report	2× (suspension)	Morača Sports Center, Podgorica; Attendance: 1,200; Referees: Doychinov, Goretsov (BUL)

6 January 2024; 16:00	Győri Audi ETO KC (Hungary)	39–20	(Sweden) IK Sävehof	Audi Aréna, Győr; Attendance: 4,285; Referees: Weijmans, Wolbertus (NED)
6 January 2024; 16:00	Kristiansen 6	(19–7)	Karlsson 4	Audi Aréna, Győr; Attendance: 4,285; Referees: Weijmans, Wolbertus (NED)
6 January 2024; 16:00	1× (suspension)	Report	1× (suspension)	Audi Aréna, Győr; Attendance: 4,285; Referees: Weijmans, Wolbertus (NED)

6 January 2024; 18:00	Brest Bretagne Handball (France)	38–28	(Hungary) DVSC Schaeffler	Brest Arena, Brest; Attendance: 4,152; Referees: Ilieva, Karbeska (MKD)
6 January 2024; 18:00	Cabral 9	(19–14)	four players 4	Brest Arena, Brest; Attendance: 4,152; Referees: Ilieva, Karbeska (MKD)
6 January 2024; 18:00	2× (suspension)	Report	3× (suspension)	Brest Arena, Brest; Attendance: 4,152; Referees: Ilieva, Karbeska (MKD)

7 January 2024; 16:00	CSM București (Romania)	44–26	(Montenegro) WHC Budućnost BEMAX	Polyvalent Hall, Bucharest; Attendance: 4,300; Referees: Lončar, Lončar (CRO)
7 January 2024; 16:00	Ingstad 8	(24–15)	Niakaté 6	Polyvalent Hall, Bucharest; Attendance: 4,300; Referees: Lončar, Lončar (CRO)
7 January 2024; 16:00	3× (suspension)	Report	3× (suspension)	Polyvalent Hall, Bucharest; Attendance: 4,300; Referees: Lončar, Lončar (CRO)

7 January 2024; 16:00	SG BBM Bietigheim (Germany)	25–28	(Denmark) Odense Håndbold	Arena Ludwigsburg, Ludwigsburg; Attendance: 2,878; Referees: Altmár, Horváth (HUN)
7 January 2024; 16:00	X. Smits 6	(10–11)	Elver, Van Wetering 6	Arena Ludwigsburg, Ludwigsburg; Attendance: 2,878; Referees: Altmár, Horváth (HUN)
7 January 2024; 16:00	1× (yellow card) 2× (suspension)	Report	1× (yellow card) 1× (suspension) 2× (red card)	Arena Ludwigsburg, Ludwigsburg; Attendance: 2,878; Referees: Altmár, Horváth (HUN)

13 January 2024; 16:00	IK Sävehof (Sweden)	29–33	(Germany) SG BBM Bietigheim	Partille Arena, Partille; Attendance: 437; Referees: Praštalo, Balvan (BIH)
13 January 2024; 16:00	Mihailovic 6	(15–14)	three players 5	Partille Arena, Partille; Attendance: 437; Referees: Praštalo, Balvan (BIH)
13 January 2024; 16:00	2× (yellow card) 1× (suspension)	Report	1× (yellow card) 3× (suspension)	Partille Arena, Partille; Attendance: 437; Referees: Praštalo, Balvan (BIH)

13 January 2024; 18:00	Odense Håndbold (Denmark)	30–31	(Hungary) Győri Audi ETO KC	Sydbank Arena Odense, Odense; Attendance: 2,296; Referees: Backović, Palačković (SLO)
13 January 2024; 18:00	Højlund, Aardahl 8	(13–15)	Nze Minko, Ryu 6	Sydbank Arena Odense, Odense; Attendance: 2,296; Referees: Backović, Palačković (SLO)
13 January 2024; 18:00	3× (suspension) 1× (red card)	Report	1× (yellow card) 4× (suspension)	Sydbank Arena Odense, Odense; Attendance: 2,296; Referees: Backović, Palačković (SLO)

14 January 2024; 16:00	WHC Budućnost BEMAX (Montenegro)	21–27	(Hungary) DVSC Schaeffler	Morača Sports Center, Podgorica; Attendance: 1,020; Referees: Álvarez, Bustamante (ESP)
14 January 2024; 16:00	Niakaté 8	(11–11)	Kácsor 9	Morača Sports Center, Podgorica; Attendance: 1,020; Referees: Álvarez, Bustamante (ESP)
14 January 2024; 16:00	3× (suspension)	Report	1× (yellow card) 1× (suspension)	Morača Sports Center, Podgorica; Attendance: 1,020; Referees: Álvarez, Bustamante (ESP)

14 January 2024; 18:00	Brest Bretagne Handball (France)	24–21	(Romania) CSM București	Brest Arena, Brest; Attendance: 4,205; Referees: Budzák, Záhradník (SVK)
14 January 2024; 18:00	Coatanea 7	(13–10)	Arntzen 5	Brest Arena, Brest; Attendance: 4,205; Referees: Budzák, Záhradník (SVK)
14 January 2024; 18:00	2× (suspension)	Report	1× (suspension)	Brest Arena, Brest; Attendance: 4,205; Referees: Budzák, Záhradník (SVK)

20 January 2024; 16:00	DVSC Schaeffler (Hungary)	22–35	(Denmark) Odense Håndbold	Hódos Imre Sportcsarnok, Debrecen; Attendance: 2,000; Referees: Vranes, Wenninger (AUT)
20 January 2024; 16:00	Kácsor 9	(12–15)	Højlund 7	Hódos Imre Sportcsarnok, Debrecen; Attendance: 2,000; Referees: Vranes, Wenninger (AUT)
20 January 2024; 16:00	2× (yellow card) 3× (suspension)	Report	2× (suspension)	Hódos Imre Sportcsarnok, Debrecen; Attendance: 2,000; Referees: Vranes, Wenninger (AUT)

20 January 2024; 18:00	Brest Bretagne Handball (France)	37–30	(Germany) SG BBM Bietigheim	Brest Arena, Brest; Attendance: 4,258; Referees: Duplii, Pobedrina (UKR)
20 January 2024; 18:00	Maslova 9	(13–17)	Döll 6	Brest Arena, Brest; Attendance: 4,258; Referees: Duplii, Pobedrina (UKR)
20 January 2024; 18:00	1× (yellow card) 4× (suspension)	Report	4× (suspension)	Brest Arena, Brest; Attendance: 4,258; Referees: Duplii, Pobedrina (UKR)

20 January 2024; 20:00	WHC Budućnost BEMAX (Montenegro)	21–29	(Hungary) Győri Audi ETO KC	Morača Sports Center, Podgorica; Attendance: 750; Referees: Hatipoğlu, Şimşek (TUR)
20 January 2024; 20:00	three players 4	(13–17)	Gros 5	Morača Sports Center, Podgorica; Attendance: 750; Referees: Hatipoğlu, Şimşek (TUR)
20 January 2024; 20:00	2× (yellow card) 3× (suspension)	Report	2× (suspension)	Morača Sports Center, Podgorica; Attendance: 750; Referees: Hatipoğlu, Şimşek (TUR)

21 January 2024; 16:00	CSM București (Romania)	35–26	(Sweden) IK Sävehof	Polyvalent Hall, Bucharest; Attendance: 3,130; Referees: Sekulić, Jovandić (SRB)
21 January 2024; 16:00	Dindiligan, Ingstad 7	(18–10)	Sembe 6	Polyvalent Hall, Bucharest; Attendance: 3,130; Referees: Sekulić, Jovandić (SRB)
21 January 2024; 16:00		Report	2× (suspension)	Polyvalent Hall, Bucharest; Attendance: 3,130; Referees: Sekulić, Jovandić (SRB)

2 February 2024; 20:45	IK Sävehof (Sweden)	23–27	(Montenegro) WHC Budućnost BEMAX	Partille Arena, Partille; Attendance: 453; Referees: Altmár, Horváth (HUN)
2 February 2024; 20:45	Jensen 6	(12–13)	Godeč 9	Partille Arena, Partille; Attendance: 453; Referees: Altmár, Horváth (HUN)
2 February 2024; 20:45	4× (suspension)	Report	2× (suspension)	Partille Arena, Partille; Attendance: 453; Referees: Altmár, Horváth (HUN)

3 February 2024; 16:00	Odense Håndbold (Denmark)	29–29	(France) Brest Bretagne Handball	Sydbank Arena Odense, Odense; Attendance: 2,103; Referees: Vujačić, Kažanegra (MNE)
3 February 2024; 16:00	Højlund 7	(14–14)	Lassource 6	Sydbank Arena Odense, Odense; Attendance: 2,103; Referees: Vujačić, Kažanegra (MNE)
3 February 2024; 16:00	1× (yellow card) 3× (suspension)	Report	1× (yellow card) 3× (suspension)	Sydbank Arena Odense, Odense; Attendance: 2,103; Referees: Vujačić, Kažanegra (MNE)

3 February 2024; 18:00	Győri Audi ETO KC (Hungary)	24–26	(Romania) CSM București	Audi Aréna, Győr; Attendance: 5,038; Referees: Braseth, Sundet (NOR)
3 February 2024; 18:00	Győri-Lukács, Kristiansen 6	(8–15)	Zaadi 8	Audi Aréna, Győr; Attendance: 5,038; Referees: Braseth, Sundet (NOR)
3 February 2024; 18:00	1× (yellow card) 1× (suspension)	Report	1× (yellow card)	Audi Aréna, Győr; Attendance: 5,038; Referees: Braseth, Sundet (NOR)

4 February 2024; 14:00	SG BBM Bietigheim (Germany)	27–31	(Hungary) DVSC Schaeffler	Arena Ludwigsburg, Ludwigsburg; Attendance: 2,267; Referees: Ilieva, Karbeska (MKD)
4 February 2024; 14:00	Döll 9	(15–13)	Kácsor 7	Arena Ludwigsburg, Ludwigsburg; Attendance: 2,267; Referees: Ilieva, Karbeska (MKD)
4 February 2024; 14:00	2× (suspension)	Report	1× (yellow card) 2× (suspension)	Arena Ludwigsburg, Ludwigsburg; Attendance: 2,267; Referees: Ilieva, Karbeska (MKD)

10 February 2024; 18:00	WHC Budućnost BEMAX (Montenegro)	17–33	(Denmark) Odense Håndbold	Bemax Arena, Podgorica; Attendance: 530; Referees: Lovin, Stancu (ROU)
10 February 2024; 18:00	J. Vukčević 7	(13–16)	Aagot 7	Bemax Arena, Podgorica; Attendance: 530; Referees: Lovin, Stancu (ROU)
10 February 2024; 18:00	1× (yellow card) 2× (suspension)	Report	2× (suspension)	Bemax Arena, Podgorica; Attendance: 530; Referees: Lovin, Stancu (ROU)

10 February 2024; 18:00	DVSC Schaeffler (Hungary)	29–28	(Hungary) Győri Audi ETO KC	Hódos Imre Sportcsarnok, Debrecen; Attendance: 2,100; Referees: Praštalo, Balvan (BIH)
10 February 2024; 18:00	Jovović 5	(14–14)	Nze Minko 6	Hódos Imre Sportcsarnok, Debrecen; Attendance: 2,100; Referees: Praštalo, Balvan (BIH)
10 February 2024; 18:00	2× (yellow card) 1× (suspension)	Report	1× (yellow card) 3× (suspension)	Hódos Imre Sportcsarnok, Debrecen; Attendance: 2,100; Referees: Praštalo, Balvan (BIH)

11 February 2024; 16:00	CSM București (Romania)	31–28	(Germany) SG BBM Bietigheim	Polyvalent Hall, Bucharest; Attendance: 2,500; Referees: Tzaferopoulos, Bethmann (GRE)
11 February 2024; 16:00	Neagu 6	(17–10)	Kudłacz-Gloc 6	Polyvalent Hall, Bucharest; Attendance: 2,500; Referees: Tzaferopoulos, Bethmann (GRE)
11 February 2024; 16:00	1× (yellow card) 3× (suspension)	Report	2× (yellow card) 2× (suspension)	Polyvalent Hall, Bucharest; Attendance: 2,500; Referees: Tzaferopoulos, Bethmann (GRE)

11 February 2024; 18:00	Brest Bretagne Handball (France)	28–23	(Sweden) IK Sävehof	Brest Arena, Brest; Attendance: 4,125; Referees: Hatipoğlu, Şimşek (TUR)
11 February 2024; 18:00	Maslova 8	(10–9)	Jensen, Koppang 6	Brest Arena, Brest; Attendance: 4,125; Referees: Hatipoğlu, Şimşek (TUR)
11 February 2024; 18:00	1× (suspension)	Report	2× (yellow card) 3× (suspension)	Brest Arena, Brest; Attendance: 4,125; Referees: Hatipoğlu, Şimşek (TUR)

17 February 2024; 16:00	SG BBM Bietigheim (Germany)	34–16	(Montenegro) WHC Budućnost BEMAX	Arena Ludwigsburg, Ludwigsburg; Attendance: 1,511; Referees: Bočáková, Jánošíková (SVK)
17 February 2024; 16:00	Dulfer 9	(19–7)	J. Vukčević 4	Arena Ludwigsburg, Ludwigsburg; Attendance: 1,511; Referees: Bočáková, Jánošíková (SVK)
17 February 2024; 16:00	1× (suspension)	Report	4× (suspension)	Arena Ludwigsburg, Ludwigsburg; Attendance: 1,511; Referees: Bočáková, Jánošíková (SVK)

17 February 2024; 18:00	Győri Audi ETO KC (Hungary)	32–32	(France) Brest Bretagne Handball	Audi Aréna, Győr; Attendance: 4,511; Referees: Metalari, Nikolovski (MKD)
17 February 2024; 18:00	Győri-Lukács, Nze Minko 6	(18–18)	Maslova 8	Audi Aréna, Győr; Attendance: 4,511; Referees: Metalari, Nikolovski (MKD)
17 February 2024; 18:00	2× (yellow card) 2× (suspension)	Report	3× (suspension)	Audi Aréna, Győr; Attendance: 4,511; Referees: Metalari, Nikolovski (MKD)

18 February 2024; 14:00	Odense Håndbold (Denmark)	29–25	(Romania) CSM București	Sydbank Arena Odense, Odense; Attendance: 2,298; Referees: Petrušis, Barysas (LTU)
18 February 2024; 14:00	three players 5	(16–11)	Neagu 7	Sydbank Arena Odense, Odense; Attendance: 2,298; Referees: Petrušis, Barysas (LTU)
18 February 2024; 14:00	2× (suspension)	Report	5× (suspension)	Sydbank Arena Odense, Odense; Attendance: 2,298; Referees: Petrušis, Barysas (LTU)

18 February 2024; 16:00	IK Sävehof (Sweden)	27–36	(Hungary) DVSC Schaeffler	Partille Arena, Partille; Attendance: 428; Referees: Přemysl, Mohyla (CZE)
18 February 2024; 16:00	Stankiewicz 12	(14–18)	Töpfner 8	Partille Arena, Partille; Attendance: 428; Referees: Přemysl, Mohyla (CZE)
18 February 2024; 16:00	5× (suspension)	Report	7× (suspension)	Partille Arena, Partille; Attendance: 428; Referees: Přemysl, Mohyla (CZE)

=== Group B ===
Pos	Team	Pld	W	D	L	GF	GA	GD	Pts	Qualification
1	(France) Metz Handball	14	11	0	3	470	402	+68	22 (Note: Metz 63–60 Esbjerg)	Quarterfinals
2	(Denmark) Team Esbjerg	14	11	0	3	449	412	+37	22	Quarterfinals
3	(Denmark) Ikast Håndbold	14	10	1	3	476	435	+41	21	Playoffs
4	(Norway) Vipers Kristiansand	14	7	1	6	445	403	+42	15	Playoffs
5	(Slovenia) RK Krim Mercator	14	6	1	7	389	384	+5	13	Playoffs
6	(Hungary) FTC-Rail Cargo Hungaria	14	4	2	8	387	408	−21	10	Playoffs
7	(Romania) CS Rapid București	14	4	1	9	366	399	−33	9	
8	(Poland) MKS Zagłębie Lubin	14	0	0	14	327	466	−139	0	

Source: EHF
Rules for classification: Tiebreakers
Notes:

9 September 2023; 16:00	FTC-Rail Cargo Hungaria (Hungary)	25–38	(France) Metz Handball	Érd Aréna, Érd; Attendance: 1,400; Referees: Petrušis, Barysas (LTU)
9 September 2023; 16:00	Malestein 9	(13–19)	Valentini 9	Érd Aréna, Érd; Attendance: 1,400; Referees: Petrušis, Barysas (LTU)
9 September 2023; 16:00	5× (suspension)	Report	1× (yellow card) 5× (suspension)	Érd Aréna, Érd; Attendance: 1,400; Referees: Petrušis, Barysas (LTU)

9 September 2023; 16:00	Ikast Håndbold (Denmark)	30–26	(Norway) Vipers Kristiansand	Ikast-Brande Arena, Ikast; Attendance: 1,988; Referees: Merz, Kuttler (GER)
9 September 2023; 16:00	three players 5	(12–12)	Knedlíková 7	Ikast-Brande Arena, Ikast; Attendance: 1,988; Referees: Merz, Kuttler (GER)
9 September 2023; 16:00	1× (yellow card) 1× (suspension)	Report	2× (suspension)	Ikast-Brande Arena, Ikast; Attendance: 1,988; Referees: Merz, Kuttler (GER)

9 September 2023; 18:00	MKS Zagłębie Lubin (Poland)	18–36	(Slovenia) RK Krim Mercator	Hala Widowiskowo Sportowa RCS Lubin, Lubin; Attendance: 3,009; Referees: Ilieva, Karbeska (MKD)
9 September 2023; 18:00	Grzyb 5	(6–19)	four players 5	Hala Widowiskowo Sportowa RCS Lubin, Lubin; Attendance: 3,009; Referees: Ilieva, Karbeska (MKD)
9 September 2023; 18:00	1× (yellow card)	Report	5× (suspension)	Hala Widowiskowo Sportowa RCS Lubin, Lubin; Attendance: 3,009; Referees: Ilieva, Karbeska (MKD)

10 September 2023; 16:00	Team Esbjerg (Denmark)	30–28	(Romania) CS Rapid București	Blue Water Dokken, Esbjerg; Attendance: 2,141; Referees: Sekulić, Jovandić (SRB)
10 September 2023; 16:00	Breistøl, Reistad 6	(16–12)	three players 5	Blue Water Dokken, Esbjerg; Attendance: 2,141; Referees: Sekulić, Jovandić (SRB)
10 September 2023; 16:00	1× (yellow card) 2× (suspension)	Report	1× (yellow card) 4× (suspension) 1× (red card)	Blue Water Dokken, Esbjerg; Attendance: 2,141; Referees: Sekulić, Jovandić (SRB)

16 September 2023; 18:00	CS Rapid București (Romania)	26–25	(Poland) MKS Zagłębie Lubin	Polyvalent Hall, Bucharest; Attendance: 3,200; Referees: Hatipoğlu, Şimşek (TUR)
16 September 2023; 18:00	O. Kanor 7	(12–15)	Grzyb, Górna 5	Polyvalent Hall, Bucharest; Attendance: 3,200; Referees: Hatipoğlu, Şimşek (TUR)
16 September 2023; 18:00	1× (yellow card) 5× (suspension)	Report	1× (yellow card) 4× (suspension)	Polyvalent Hall, Bucharest; Attendance: 3,200; Referees: Hatipoğlu, Şimşek (TUR)

16 September 2023; 18:00	Vipers Kristiansand (Norway)	37–26	(Hungary) FTC-Rail Cargo Hungaria	Aquarama Kristiansand, Kristiansand; Attendance: 1,646; Referees: Álvarez, Bustamante (ESP)
16 September 2023; 18:00	Knedlíková 8	(19–15)	Lekić 10	Aquarama Kristiansand, Kristiansand; Attendance: 1,646; Referees: Álvarez, Bustamante (ESP)
16 September 2023; 18:00	2× (suspension)	Report	5× (suspension)	Aquarama Kristiansand, Kristiansand; Attendance: 1,646; Referees: Álvarez, Bustamante (ESP)

17 September 2023; 14:00	RK Krim Mercator (Slovenia)	33–27	(Denmark) Team Esbjerg	Arena Stožice, Ljubljana; Attendance: 1,945; Referees: Vujačić, Kažanegra (MNE)
17 September 2023; 14:00	Mavsar 8	(15–12)	Breistøl 6	Arena Stožice, Ljubljana; Attendance: 1,945; Referees: Vujačić, Kažanegra (MNE)
17 September 2023; 14:00	1× (suspension)	Report	1× (yellow card) 2× (suspension)	Arena Stožice, Ljubljana; Attendance: 1,945; Referees: Vujačić, Kažanegra (MNE)

17 September 2023; 16:00	Metz Handball (France)	36–39	(Denmark) Ikast Håndbold	Arènes de Metz, Metz; Attendance: 3,052; Referees: Vranes, Wenninger (AUT)
17 September 2023; 16:00	Jørgensen 7	(17–20)	Friis 9	Arènes de Metz, Metz; Attendance: 3,052; Referees: Vranes, Wenninger (AUT)
17 September 2023; 16:00	6× (suspension) 1× (red card)	Report	1× (yellow card) 7× (suspension)	Arènes de Metz, Metz; Attendance: 3,052; Referees: Vranes, Wenninger (AUT)

23 September 2023; 18:00	Team Esbjerg (Denmark)	29–27	(France) Metz Handball	Blue Water Dokken, Esbjerg; Attendance: 2,037; Referees: Lovin, Stancu (ROU)
23 September 2023; 18:00	Reistad 8	(16–17)	Burgaard 6	Blue Water Dokken, Esbjerg; Attendance: 2,037; Referees: Lovin, Stancu (ROU)
23 September 2023; 18:00	1× (yellow card) 3× (suspension)	Report	1× (yellow card) 1× (suspension)	Blue Water Dokken, Esbjerg; Attendance: 2,037; Referees: Lovin, Stancu (ROU)

23 September 2023; 18:00	MKS Zagłębie Lubin (Poland)	20–34	(Norway) Vipers Kristiansand	Hala Widowiskowo Sportowa RCS Lubin, Lubin; Attendance: 3,211; Referees: Altmár, Horváth (HUN)
23 September 2023; 18:00	Michalak 4	(9–16)	Vyakhireva 9	Hala Widowiskowo Sportowa RCS Lubin, Lubin; Attendance: 3,211; Referees: Altmár, Horváth (HUN)
23 September 2023; 18:00	2× (suspension)	Report	1× (yellow card) 1× (suspension)	Hala Widowiskowo Sportowa RCS Lubin, Lubin; Attendance: 3,211; Referees: Altmár, Horváth (HUN)

23 September 2023; 18:00	RK Krim Mercator (Slovenia)	32–26	(Hungary) FTC-Rail Cargo Hungaria	Arena Stožice, Ljubljana; Attendance: 3,500; Referees: Praštalo, Balvan (BIH)
23 September 2023; 18:00	Dmitrieva 8	(15–10)	Klujber 8	Arena Stožice, Ljubljana; Attendance: 3,500; Referees: Praštalo, Balvan (BIH)
23 September 2023; 18:00	4× (suspension)	Report	1× (yellow card) 2× (suspension)	Arena Stožice, Ljubljana; Attendance: 3,500; Referees: Praštalo, Balvan (BIH)

24 September 2023; 16:00	CS Rapid București (Romania)	27–35	(Denmark) Ikast Håndbold	Polyvalent Hall, Bucharest; Attendance: 3,500; Referees: Jović, Arnautović (BIH)
24 September 2023; 16:00	Grozav 8	(11–20)	Jeřábková 8	Polyvalent Hall, Bucharest; Attendance: 3,500; Referees: Jović, Arnautović (BIH)
24 September 2023; 16:00	4× (suspension)	Report	3× (suspension)	Polyvalent Hall, Bucharest; Attendance: 3,500; Referees: Jović, Arnautović (BIH)

30 September 2023; 18:00	Metz Handball (France)	42–26	(Poland) MKS Zagłębie Lubin	Arènes de Metz, Metz; Attendance: 2,939; Referees: Vujačić, Kažanegra (MNE)
30 September 2023; 18:00	Valentini 9	(22–10)	Michalak, Przywara 6	Arènes de Metz, Metz; Attendance: 2,939; Referees: Vujačić, Kažanegra (MNE)
30 September 2023; 18:00	1× (yellow card) 2× (suspension)	Report	5× (suspension)	Arènes de Metz, Metz; Attendance: 2,939; Referees: Vujačić, Kažanegra (MNE)

30 September 2023; 18:00	Vipers Kristiansand (Norway)	37–38	(Denmark) Team Esbjerg	Aquarama Kristiansand, Kristiansand; Attendance: 2,200; Referees: Antić, Jakovljević (SRB)
30 September 2023; 18:00	Vyakhireva 11	(15–20)	Breistøl, Reistad 9	Aquarama Kristiansand, Kristiansand; Attendance: 2,200; Referees: Antić, Jakovljević (SRB)
30 September 2023; 18:00	1× (yellow card) 2× (suspension) 1× (red card)	Report	4× (suspension)	Aquarama Kristiansand, Kristiansand; Attendance: 2,200; Referees: Antić, Jakovljević (SRB)

30 September 2023; 18:00	FTC-Rail Cargo Hungaria (Hungary)	24–24	(Romania) CS Rapid București	Érd Aréna, Érd; Attendance: 2,500; Referees: Metalari, Nikolovski (MKD)
30 September 2023; 18:00	Lekić 6	(14–10)	Korsós 6	Érd Aréna, Érd; Attendance: 2,500; Referees: Metalari, Nikolovski (MKD)
30 September 2023; 18:00	1× (yellow card) 2× (suspension)	Report	2× (suspension)	Érd Aréna, Érd; Attendance: 2,500; Referees: Metalari, Nikolovski (MKD)

1 October 2023; 16:00	Ikast Håndbold (Denmark)	33–32	(Slovenia) RK Krim Mercator	Ikast-Brande Arena, Ikast; Attendance: 1,860; Referees: Álvarez, Bustamante (ESP)
1 October 2023; 16:00	Bakkerud, Friis 8	(14–18)	Stanko 9	Ikast-Brande Arena, Ikast; Attendance: 1,860; Referees: Álvarez, Bustamante (ESP)
1 October 2023; 16:00	1× (yellow card) 2× (suspension)	Report	1× (yellow card) 4× (suspension)	Ikast-Brande Arena, Ikast; Attendance: 1,860; Referees: Álvarez, Bustamante (ESP)

21 October 2023; 16:00	Ikast Håndbold (Denmark)	41–29	(Poland) MKS Zagłębie Lubin	Ikast-Brande Arena, Ikast; Attendance: 1,593; Referees: Christidi, Papamattheou (GRE)
21 October 2023; 16:00	Scaglione 10	(21–15)	Drabik, Kochaniak 6	Ikast-Brande Arena, Ikast; Attendance: 1,593; Referees: Christidi, Papamattheou (GRE)
21 October 2023; 16:00	2× (suspension)	Report	3× (suspension)	Ikast-Brande Arena, Ikast; Attendance: 1,593; Referees: Christidi, Papamattheou (GRE)

21 October 2023; 18:00	RK Krim Mercator (Slovenia)	24–24	(Norway) Vipers Kristiansand	Tivoli Hall, Ljubljana; Attendance: 4,000; Referees: Budzák, Záhradník (SVK)
21 October 2023; 18:00	Radičević 6	(15–9)	Knedlíková, Vyakhireva 6	Tivoli Hall, Ljubljana; Attendance: 4,000; Referees: Budzák, Záhradník (SVK)
21 October 2023; 18:00	1× (yellow card) 3× (suspension)	Report	1× (yellow card) 6× (suspension)	Tivoli Hall, Ljubljana; Attendance: 4,000; Referees: Budzák, Záhradník (SVK)

22 October 2023; 16:00	Team Esbjerg (Denmark)	27–23	(Hungary) FTC-Rail Cargo Hungaria	Blue Water Dokken, Esbjerg; Attendance: 2,550; Referees: Hatipoğlu, Şimşek (TUR)
22 October 2023; 16:00	Breistøl 6	(14–11)	Lekić 7	Blue Water Dokken, Esbjerg; Attendance: 2,550; Referees: Hatipoğlu, Şimşek (TUR)
22 October 2023; 16:00	2× (suspension)	Report	2× (yellow card) 3× (suspension)	Blue Water Dokken, Esbjerg; Attendance: 2,550; Referees: Hatipoğlu, Şimşek (TUR)

22 October 2023; 16:00	Metz Handball (France)	33–22	(Romania) CS Rapid București	Arènes de Metz, Metz; Attendance: 3,953; Referees: Praštalo, Balvan (BIH)
22 October 2023; 16:00	Jørgensen 11	(16–10)	Janjušević 4	Arènes de Metz, Metz; Attendance: 3,953; Referees: Praštalo, Balvan (BIH)
22 October 2023; 16:00	4× (suspension)	Report	5× (suspension) 1× (red card)	Arènes de Metz, Metz; Attendance: 3,953; Referees: Praštalo, Balvan (BIH)

28 October 2023; 16:00	CS Rapid București (Romania)	27–22	(Slovenia) RK Krim Mercator	Sala Sporturilor Mioveni, Mioveni; Attendance: 1,600; Referees: Altmár, Horváth (HUN)
28 October 2023; 16:00	O. Kanor 5	(15–13)	Radičević 8	Sala Sporturilor Mioveni, Mioveni; Attendance: 1,600; Referees: Altmár, Horváth (HUN)
28 October 2023; 16:00	2× (yellow card) 5× (suspension)	Report	1× (yellow card) 2× (suspension)	Sala Sporturilor Mioveni, Mioveni; Attendance: 1,600; Referees: Altmár, Horváth (HUN)

28 October 2023; 16:00	MKS Zagłębie Lubin (Poland)	24–36	(Denmark) Team Esbjerg	Hala Widowiskowo Sportowa RCS Lubin, Lubin; Attendance: 2,722; Referees: Weijmans, Wolbertus (NED)
28 October 2023; 16:00	Kochaniak 6	(14–17)	Møller 7	Hala Widowiskowo Sportowa RCS Lubin, Lubin; Attendance: 2,722; Referees: Weijmans, Wolbertus (NED)
28 October 2023; 16:00	2× (suspension)	Report	2× (suspension)	Hala Widowiskowo Sportowa RCS Lubin, Lubin; Attendance: 2,722; Referees: Weijmans, Wolbertus (NED)

28 October 2023; 18:00	FTC-Rail Cargo Hungaria (Hungary)	37–36	(Denmark) Ikast Håndbold	Érd Aréna, Érd; Attendance: 2,200; Referees: Sekulić, Jovandić (SRB)
28 October 2023; 18:00	Klujber 11	(20–17)	Jeřábková 9	Érd Aréna, Érd; Attendance: 2,200; Referees: Sekulić, Jovandić (SRB)
28 October 2023; 18:00	1× (yellow card) 4× (suspension) 1× (red card)	Report	2× (yellow card) 5× (suspension)	Érd Aréna, Érd; Attendance: 2,200; Referees: Sekulić, Jovandić (SRB)

29 October 2023; 16:00	Vipers Kristiansand (Norway)	34–36	(France) Metz Handball	Aquarama Kristiansand, Kristiansand; Attendance: 1,579; Referees: Tzaferopoulos, Bethmann (GRE)
29 October 2023; 16:00	Vyakhireva 8	(17–14)	Bouktit 13	Aquarama Kristiansand, Kristiansand; Attendance: 1,579; Referees: Tzaferopoulos, Bethmann (GRE)
29 October 2023; 16:00	2× (yellow card) 4× (suspension)	Report	2× (yellow card) 2× (suspension)	Aquarama Kristiansand, Kristiansand; Attendance: 1,579; Referees: Tzaferopoulos, Bethmann (GRE)

11 November 2023; 16:00	FTC-Rail Cargo Hungaria (Hungary)	35–22	(Poland) MKS Zagłębie Lubin	Érd Aréna, Érd; Attendance: 1,477; Referees: Braseth, Sundet (NOR)
11 November 2023; 16:00	Lekić 9	(12–8)	Górna, Grzyb 4	Érd Aréna, Érd; Attendance: 1,477; Referees: Braseth, Sundet (NOR)
11 November 2023; 16:00	1× (yellow card) 4× (suspension)	Report	3× (suspension)	Érd Aréna, Érd; Attendance: 1,477; Referees: Braseth, Sundet (NOR)

12 November 2023; 14:00	CS Rapid București (Romania)	30–29	(Norway) Vipers Kristiansand	Polyvalent Hall, Bucharest; Attendance: 4,000; Referees: Duplii, Pobedrina (UKR)
12 November 2023; 14:00	Buceschi 6	(10–13)	Abbingh, Arcos 6	Polyvalent Hall, Bucharest; Attendance: 4,000; Referees: Duplii, Pobedrina (UKR)
12 November 2023; 14:00	1× (yellow card) 3× (suspension)	Report	1× (yellow card) 2× (suspension) 1× (red card)	Polyvalent Hall, Bucharest; Attendance: 4,000; Referees: Duplii, Pobedrina (UKR)

12 November 2023; 16:00	RK Krim Mercator (Slovenia)	22–28	(France) Metz Handball	Arena Stožice, Ljubljana; Attendance: 3,850; Referees: Hansen, Madsen (DEN)
12 November 2023; 16:00	Stanko 5	(10–14)	Jørgensen, Valentini 7	Arena Stožice, Ljubljana; Attendance: 3,850; Referees: Hansen, Madsen (DEN)
12 November 2023; 16:00	3× (suspension)	Report	1× (yellow card) 2× (suspension)	Arena Stožice, Ljubljana; Attendance: 3,850; Referees: Hansen, Madsen (DEN)

12 November 2023; 16:00	Ikast Håndbold (Denmark)	34–35	(Denmark) Team Esbjerg	Ikast-Brande Arena, Ikast; Attendance: 1,488; Referees: Bolic, Hurich (AUT)
12 November 2023; 16:00	Jeřábková 8	(16–18)	Mørk, Reistad 8	Ikast-Brande Arena, Ikast; Attendance: 1,488; Referees: Bolic, Hurich (AUT)
12 November 2023; 16:00	1× (yellow card) 3× (suspension)	Report	1× (suspension)	Ikast-Brande Arena, Ikast; Attendance: 1,488; Referees: Bolic, Hurich (AUT)

18 November 2023; 18:00	Vipers Kristiansand (Norway)	35–30	(Romania) CS Rapid București	Aquarama Kristiansand, Kristiansand; Attendance: 1,629; Referees: Thiyagarajah, Thiyagarajah (GER)
18 November 2023; 18:00	Knedlíková 8	(18–14)	Fernández 6	Aquarama Kristiansand, Kristiansand; Attendance: 1,629; Referees: Thiyagarajah, Thiyagarajah (GER)
18 November 2023; 18:00	3× (suspension)	Report	3× (suspension)	Aquarama Kristiansand, Kristiansand; Attendance: 1,629; Referees: Thiyagarajah, Thiyagarajah (GER)

19 November 2023; 14:00	MKS Zagłębie Lubin (Poland)	23–35	(Hungary) FTC-Rail Cargo Hungaria	Hala Widowiskowo Sportowa RCS Lubin, Lubin; Attendance: 3,002; Referees: Vranes, Wenninger (AUT)
19 November 2023; 14:00	Kochaniak 11	(15–18)	Lekić, Márton 7	Hala Widowiskowo Sportowa RCS Lubin, Lubin; Attendance: 3,002; Referees: Vranes, Wenninger (AUT)
19 November 2023; 14:00	3× (suspension)	Report	1× (yellow card) 3× (suspension)	Hala Widowiskowo Sportowa RCS Lubin, Lubin; Attendance: 3,002; Referees: Vranes, Wenninger (AUT)

19 November 2023; 16:00	Team Esbjerg (Denmark)	37–34	(Denmark) Ikast Håndbold	Blue Water Dokken, Esbjerg; Attendance: 2,477; Referees: Altmár, Horváth (HUN)
19 November 2023; 16:00	Breistøl 12	(18–14)	Bakkerud 9	Blue Water Dokken, Esbjerg; Attendance: 2,477; Referees: Altmár, Horváth (HUN)
19 November 2023; 16:00	4× (suspension)	Report	1× (yellow card) 2× (suspension)	Blue Water Dokken, Esbjerg; Attendance: 2,477; Referees: Altmár, Horváth (HUN)

19 November 2023; 16:00	Metz Handball (France)	40–31	(Slovenia) RK Krim Mercator	Arènes de Metz, Metz; Attendance: 4,302; Referees: Sekulić, Jovandić (SRB)
19 November 2023; 16:00	Jørgensen, Valentini 8	(20–12)	Radičević 10	Arènes de Metz, Metz; Attendance: 4,302; Referees: Sekulić, Jovandić (SRB)
19 November 2023; 16:00	2× (suspension)	Report	5× (suspension)	Arènes de Metz, Metz; Attendance: 4,302; Referees: Sekulić, Jovandić (SRB)

6 January 2024; 16:00	Team Esbjerg (Denmark)	32–26	(Poland) MKS Zagłębie Lubin	Blue Water Dokken, Esbjerg; Attendance: 2,358; Referees: Sirbu, Serdiuc (MDA)
6 January 2024; 16:00	Reistad 6	(19–11)	Michalak 7	Blue Water Dokken, Esbjerg; Attendance: 2,358; Referees: Sirbu, Serdiuc (MDA)
6 January 2024; 16:00	2× (suspension)	Report	4× (suspension)	Blue Water Dokken, Esbjerg; Attendance: 2,358; Referees: Sirbu, Serdiuc (MDA)

6 January 2024; 18:00	RK Krim Mercator (Slovenia)	25–24	(Romania) CS Rapid București	Arena Stožice, Ljubljana; Attendance: 3,500; Referees: Petrušis, Barysas (LTU)
6 January 2024; 18:00	Grbić 6	(11–12)	Korsós 8	Arena Stožice, Ljubljana; Attendance: 3,500; Referees: Petrušis, Barysas (LTU)
6 January 2024; 18:00	1× (yellow card) 2× (suspension)	Report	1× (yellow card) 1× (suspension)	Arena Stožice, Ljubljana; Attendance: 3,500; Referees: Petrušis, Barysas (LTU)

7 January 2024; 14:00	Ikast Håndbold (Denmark)	28–28	(Hungary) FTC-Rail Cargo Hungaria	Ikast-Brande Arena, Ikast; Attendance: 1,533; Referees: Duplii, Pobedrina (UKR)
7 January 2024; 14:00	Bakkerud 5	(17–16)	Lekić 10	Ikast-Brande Arena, Ikast; Attendance: 1,533; Referees: Duplii, Pobedrina (UKR)
7 January 2024; 14:00	1× (yellow card) 4× (suspension)	Report	1× (yellow card) 4× (suspension)	Ikast-Brande Arena, Ikast; Attendance: 1,533; Referees: Duplii, Pobedrina (UKR)

7 January 2024; 16:00	Metz Handball (France)	31–29	(Norway) Vipers Kristiansand	Arènes de Metz, Metz; Attendance: 4,776; Referees: Hatipoğlu, Şimşek (TUR)
7 January 2024; 16:00	Jørgensen 9	(13–14)	Vyakhireva 7	Arènes de Metz, Metz; Attendance: 4,776; Referees: Hatipoğlu, Şimşek (TUR)
7 January 2024; 16:00	1× (yellow card) 3× (suspension)	Report	2× (yellow card) 3× (suspension)	Arènes de Metz, Metz; Attendance: 4,776; Referees: Hatipoğlu, Şimşek (TUR)

13 January 2024; 16:00	FTC-Rail Cargo Hungaria (Hungary)	28–33	(Denmark) Team Esbjerg	Érd Aréna, Érd; Attendance: 1,900; Referees: Doychinov, Goretsov (BUL)
13 January 2024; 16:00	Cvijić, Klujber 6	(16–15)	Mørk 11	Érd Aréna, Érd; Attendance: 1,900; Referees: Doychinov, Goretsov (BUL)
13 January 2024; 16:00	1× (yellow card) 2× (suspension)	Report	2× (suspension)	Érd Aréna, Érd; Attendance: 1,900; Referees: Doychinov, Goretsov (BUL)

13 January 2024; 18:00	Vipers Kristiansand (Norway)	29–23	(Slovenia) RK Krim Mercator	Aquarama Kristiansand, Kristiansand; Attendance: 1,432; Referees: Lovin, Stancu (ROU)
13 January 2024; 18:00	Roberts, Vyakhireva 7	(14–12)	Dmitrieva 7	Aquarama Kristiansand, Kristiansand; Attendance: 1,432; Referees: Lovin, Stancu (ROU)
13 January 2024; 18:00	2× (suspension)	Report	1× (yellow card) 4× (suspension)	Aquarama Kristiansand, Kristiansand; Attendance: 1,432; Referees: Lovin, Stancu (ROU)

14 January 2024; 14:00	MKS Zagłębie Lubin (Poland)	26–35	(Denmark) Ikast Håndbold	Hala Widowiskowo Sportowa RCS Lubin, Lubin; Attendance: 2,209; Referees: Vujačić, Kažanegra (MNE)
14 January 2024; 14:00	Górna 7	(15–21)	Scaglione 7	Hala Widowiskowo Sportowa RCS Lubin, Lubin; Attendance: 2,209; Referees: Vujačić, Kažanegra (MNE)
14 January 2024; 14:00	2× (suspension)	Report	2× (suspension)	Hala Widowiskowo Sportowa RCS Lubin, Lubin; Attendance: 2,209; Referees: Vujačić, Kažanegra (MNE)

14 January 2024; 16:00	CS Rapid București (Romania)	31–34	(France) Metz Handball	Polyvalent Hall, Bucharest; Attendance: 4,300; Referees: Antić, Jakovljević (SRB)
14 January 2024; 16:00	Fernández, Korsós 7	(18–16)	Bouktit 12	Polyvalent Hall, Bucharest; Attendance: 4,300; Referees: Antić, Jakovljević (SRB)
14 January 2024; 16:00	2× (yellow card) 2× (suspension)	Report	1× (yellow card) 2× (suspension)	Polyvalent Hall, Bucharest; Attendance: 4,300; Referees: Antić, Jakovljević (SRB)

20 January 2024; 18:00	FTC-Rail Cargo Hungaria (Hungary)	26–28	(Slovenia) RK Krim Mercator	Érd Aréna, Érd; Attendance: 2,000; Referees: Jurinović, Mrvica (SRB)
20 January 2024; 18:00	Klujber 8	(14–17)	Dmitrieva, Grbić 9	Érd Aréna, Érd; Attendance: 2,000; Referees: Jurinović, Mrvica (SRB)
20 January 2024; 18:00	1× (yellow card) 5× (suspension)	Report	1× (yellow card) 5× (suspension)	Érd Aréna, Érd; Attendance: 2,000; Referees: Jurinović, Mrvica (SRB)

21 January 2024; 14:00	MKS Zagłębie Lubin (Poland)	24–30	(France) Metz Handball	Hala Widowiskowo Sportowa RCS Lubin, Lubin; Attendance: 1,509; Referees: Bočáková, Jánošíková (SVK)
21 January 2024; 14:00	Górna 6	(10–15)	Grijseels 9	Hala Widowiskowo Sportowa RCS Lubin, Lubin; Attendance: 1,509; Referees: Bočáková, Jánošíková (SVK)
21 January 2024; 14:00	5× (suspension)	Report	1× (yellow card) 4× (suspension)	Hala Widowiskowo Sportowa RCS Lubin, Lubin; Attendance: 1,509; Referees: Bočáková, Jánošíková (SVK)

21 January 2024; 14:00	Ikast Håndbold (Denmark)	30–29	(Romania) CS Rapid București	Ikast-Brande Arena, Ikast; Attendance: 1,677; Referees: Weijmans, Wolbertus (NED)
21 January 2024; 14:00	Jeřábková 10	(16–15)	Janjušević 11	Ikast-Brande Arena, Ikast; Attendance: 1,677; Referees: Weijmans, Wolbertus (NED)
21 January 2024; 14:00	2× (yellow card) 5× (suspension)	Report	4× (suspension)	Ikast-Brande Arena, Ikast; Attendance: 1,677; Referees: Weijmans, Wolbertus (NED)

21 January 2024; 16:00	Team Esbjerg (Denmark)	32–37	(Norway) Vipers Kristiansand	Blue Water Dokken, Esbjerg; Attendance: 2,527; Referees: Metalari, Nikolovski (MKD)
21 January 2024; 16:00	Mørk 7	(15–21)	Knedlíková 11	Blue Water Dokken, Esbjerg; Attendance: 2,527; Referees: Metalari, Nikolovski (MKD)
21 January 2024; 16:00	2× (yellow card) 2× (suspension)	Report	1× (yellow card) 5× (suspension)	Blue Water Dokken, Esbjerg; Attendance: 2,527; Referees: Metalari, Nikolovski (MKD)

3 February 2024; 18:00	Vipers Kristiansand (Norway)	28–24	(Poland) MKS Zagłębie Lubin	Aquarama Kristiansand, Kristiansand; Attendance: 1,591; Referees: Pagh, Thygesen (DEN)
3 February 2024; 18:00	Vyakhireva 7	(15–10)	Przywara 7	Aquarama Kristiansand, Kristiansand; Attendance: 1,591; Referees: Pagh, Thygesen (DEN)
3 February 2024; 18:00	1× (suspension)	Report	1× (yellow card) 3× (suspension)	Aquarama Kristiansand, Kristiansand; Attendance: 1,591; Referees: Pagh, Thygesen (DEN)

3 February 2024; 18:00	RK Krim Mercator (Slovenia)	28–34	(Denmark) Ikast Håndbold	Arena Stožice, Ljubljana; Attendance: 4,730; Referees: Antić, Jakovljević (SRB)
3 February 2024; 18:00	Lazović 6	(15–18)	Jeřábková 11	Arena Stožice, Ljubljana; Attendance: 4,730; Referees: Antić, Jakovljević (SRB)
3 February 2024; 18:00	3× (suspension)	Report	1× (yellow card) 4× (suspension)	Arena Stožice, Ljubljana; Attendance: 4,730; Referees: Antić, Jakovljević (SRB)

4 February 2024; 16:00	Metz Handball (France)	36–31	(Denmark) Team Esbjerg	Palais des Sports Jean Weille, Nancy; Attendance: 4,525; Referees: Petrušis, Barysas (LTU)
4 February 2024; 16:00	Bouktit 8	(20–17)	Mørk 8	Palais des Sports Jean Weille, Nancy; Attendance: 4,525; Referees: Petrušis, Barysas (LTU)
4 February 2024; 16:00	5× (suspension)	Report	1× (yellow card) 4× (suspension) 1× (red card)	Palais des Sports Jean Weille, Nancy; Attendance: 4,525; Referees: Petrušis, Barysas (LTU)

4 February 2024; 16:00	CS Rapid București (Romania)	20–23	(Hungary) FTC-Rail Cargo Hungaria	Polyvalent Hall, Bucharest; Attendance: 4,500; Referees: Álvarez, Bustamante (ESP)
4 February 2024; 16:00	Janjušević 7	(11–16)	Bölk 8	Polyvalent Hall, Bucharest; Attendance: 4,500; Referees: Álvarez, Bustamante (ESP)
4 February 2024; 16:00	1× (yellow card) 2× (suspension)	Report	1× (yellow card) 3× (suspension)	Polyvalent Hall, Bucharest; Attendance: 4,500; Referees: Álvarez, Bustamante (ESP)

10 February 2024; 16:00	FTC-Rail Cargo Hungaria (Hungary)	27–35	(Norway) Vipers Kristiansand	Érd Aréna, Érd; Attendance: 1,600; Referees: Carmaux, Mursch (FRA)
10 February 2024; 16:00	Klujber 10	(13–17)	Vyakhireva 9	Érd Aréna, Érd; Attendance: 1,600; Referees: Carmaux, Mursch (FRA)
10 February 2024; 16:00	2× (yellow card) 3× (suspension)	Report	1× (suspension)	Érd Aréna, Érd; Attendance: 1,600; Referees: Carmaux, Mursch (FRA)

10 February 2024; 16:00	MKS Zagłębie Lubin (Poland)	21–24	(Romania) CS Rapid București	Hala Widowiskowo Sportowa RCS Lubin, Lubin; Attendance: 2,221; Referees: Doychinov, Goretsov (BUL)
10 February 2024; 16:00	Michalak 6	(15–13)	Korsós 6	Hala Widowiskowo Sportowa RCS Lubin, Lubin; Attendance: 2,221; Referees: Doychinov, Goretsov (BUL)
10 February 2024; 16:00	1× (yellow card) 7× (suspension) 1× (red card)	Report	1× (yellow card) 3× (suspension)	Hala Widowiskowo Sportowa RCS Lubin, Lubin; Attendance: 2,221; Referees: Doychinov, Goretsov (BUL)

10 February 2024; 18:00	Team Esbjerg (Denmark)	29–21	(Slovenia) RK Krim Mercator	Blue Water Dokken, Esbjerg; Attendance: 2,407; Referees: Duplii, Pobedrina (UKR)
10 February 2024; 18:00	Mørk 7	(19–7)	Dmitrieva 10	Blue Water Dokken, Esbjerg; Attendance: 2,407; Referees: Duplii, Pobedrina (UKR)
10 February 2024; 18:00	4× (suspension)	Report	1× (yellow card) 4× (suspension)	Blue Water Dokken, Esbjerg; Attendance: 2,407; Referees: Duplii, Pobedrina (UKR)

11 February 2024; 14:00	Ikast Håndbold (Denmark)	35–34	(France) Metz Handball	Ikast-Brande Arena, Ikast; Attendance: 2,051; Referees: Thiyagarajah, Thiyagarajah (GER)
11 February 2024; 14:00	Jeřábková 11	(18–16)	Bouktit 8	Ikast-Brande Arena, Ikast; Attendance: 2,051; Referees: Thiyagarajah, Thiyagarajah (GER)
11 February 2024; 14:00	2× (suspension)	Report	1× (yellow card) 4× (suspension)	Ikast-Brande Arena, Ikast; Attendance: 2,051; Referees: Thiyagarajah, Thiyagarajah (GER)

17 February 2024; 16:00	Metz Handball (France)	25–24	(Hungary) FTC-Rail Cargo Hungaria	Arènes de Metz, Metz; Attendance: 4,451; Referees: Weijmans, Wolbertus (NED)
17 February 2024; 16:00	Bouktit 6	(14–9)	Klujber 8	Arènes de Metz, Metz; Attendance: 4,451; Referees: Weijmans, Wolbertus (NED)
17 February 2024; 16:00	7× (suspension)	Report	1× (yellow card) 7× (suspension) 1× (red card)	Arènes de Metz, Metz; Attendance: 4,451; Referees: Weijmans, Wolbertus (NED)

17 February 2024; 18:00	Vipers Kristiansand (Norway)	31–32	(Denmark) Ikast Håndbold	Aquarama Kristiansand, Kristiansand; Attendance: 1,458; Referees: Lončar, Lončar (CRO)
17 February 2024; 18:00	Vyakhireva 8	(16–14)	Iversen, Lindqvist 6	Aquarama Kristiansand, Kristiansand; Attendance: 1,458; Referees: Lončar, Lončar (CRO)
17 February 2024; 18:00	1× (yellow card) 6× (suspension)	Report	1× (yellow card) 4× (suspension) 1× (red card)	Aquarama Kristiansand, Kristiansand; Attendance: 1,458; Referees: Lončar, Lončar (CRO)

17 February 2024; 18:00	RK Krim Mercator (Slovenia)	32–19	(Poland) MKS Zagłębie Lubin	Arena Stožice, Ljubljana; Attendance: 4,000; Referees: Merisi, Pepe (ITA)
17 February 2024; 18:00	Dmitrieva 9	(18–10)	Michalak 6	Arena Stožice, Ljubljana; Attendance: 4,000; Referees: Merisi, Pepe (ITA)
17 February 2024; 18:00	1× (yellow card) 4× (suspension)	Report	3× (suspension)	Arena Stožice, Ljubljana; Attendance: 4,000; Referees: Merisi, Pepe (ITA)

18 February 2024; 16:00	CS Rapid București (Romania)	24–33	(Denmark) Team Esbjerg	Polyvalent Hall, Bucharest; Attendance: 2,160; Referees: Ilieva, Karbeska (MKD)
18 February 2024; 16:00	Kassoma, Kanor 5	(10–14)	Reistad 8	Polyvalent Hall, Bucharest; Attendance: 2,160; Referees: Ilieva, Karbeska (MKD)
18 February 2024; 16:00	2× (suspension)	Report	1× (yellow card) 2× (suspension)	Polyvalent Hall, Bucharest; Attendance: 2,160; Referees: Ilieva, Karbeska (MKD)
