= 2023–24 Women's EHF Champions League knockout stage =

The 2023–24 Women's EHF Champions League knockout stage began on 16 March with the playoffs and ended on 2 June 2024 with the final at the MVM Dome in Budapest, Hungary, to decide the winners of the 2023–24 Women's EHF Champions League. A total of twelve teams competed in the knockout phase.

== Format ==
In the playoffs, the eight teams ranked 3rd–6th in Groups A and B played against each other in two-legged home-and-away matches. The four winning teams advanced to the quarterfinals, where they were joined by the top-two teams of Groups A and B for another round of two-legged home-and-away matches. The four quarterfinal winners qualified for the final four tournament at the MVM Dome in Budapest, Hungary.

== Qualified teams ==
The top six teams from Groups A and B qualified for the knockout stage.

Group	Qualified for quarterfinals		Qualified for playoffs			
Group	First place	Second place	Third place	Fourth place	Fifth place	Sixth place
A	(Hungary) Győri Audi ETO KC	(Denmark) Odense Håndbold	(France) Brest Bretagne Handball	(Romania) CSM București	(Hungary) DVSC Schaeffler	(Germany) SG BBM Bietigheim
B	(France) Metz Handball	(Denmark) Team Esbjerg	(Denmark) Ikast Håndbold	(Norway) Vipers Kristiansand	(Slovenia) RK Krim Mercator	(Hungary) FTC-Rail Cargo Hungaria

== Playoffs ==
=== Overview ===
Team 1	Agg.	Team 2	1st leg	2nd leg
FTC-Rail Cargo Hungaria (Hungary)	59–56	(France) Brest Bretagne Handball	28–30	31–26
SG BBM Bietigheim (Germany)	60–58	(Denmark) Ikast Håndbold	29–27	31–31
RK Krim Mercator (Slovenia)	48–60	(Romania) CSM București	24–30	24–30
DVSC Schaeffler (Hungary)	55–56	(Norway) Vipers Kristiansand	28–29	27–27

==== Matches ====
16 March 2024; 16:00	FTC-Rail Cargo Hungaria (Hungary)	28–30	(France) Brest Bretagne Handball	Érd Aréna, Érd; Attendance: 1,900; Referees: Brunner, Salah (SUI)
16 March 2024; 16:00	Lekić 9	(15–14)	Maslova 9	Érd Aréna, Érd; Attendance: 1,900; Referees: Brunner, Salah (SUI)
16 March 2024; 16:00	5× (suspension)	Report	6× (suspension) 1× (red card)	Érd Aréna, Érd; Attendance: 1,900; Referees: Brunner, Salah (SUI)

24 March 2024; 18:00	Brest Bretagne Handball (France)	26–31	(Hungary) FTC-Rail Cargo Hungaria	Brest Arena, Brest; Attendance: 4,000; Referees: Kurtagic, Wetterwik (SWE)
24 March 2024; 18:00	Maslova 7	(12–16)	Malestein 10	Brest Arena, Brest; Attendance: 4,000; Referees: Kurtagic, Wetterwik (SWE)
24 March 2024; 18:00		Report	1× (yellow card) 4× (suspension)	Brest Arena, Brest; Attendance: 4,000; Referees: Kurtagic, Wetterwik (SWE)

FTC-Rail Cargo Hungaria won 59–56 on aggregate.

17 March 2024; 16:00	SG BBM Bietigheim (Germany)	29–27	(Denmark) Ikast Håndbold	Arena Ludwigsburg, Ludwigsburg; Attendance: 1,723; Referees: Petrušis, Barysas (LTU)
17 March 2024; 16:00	Smits 8	(13–14)	Bakkerud 7	Arena Ludwigsburg, Ludwigsburg; Attendance: 1,723; Referees: Petrušis, Barysas (LTU)
17 March 2024; 16:00	1× (yellow card) 2× (suspension)	Report	4× (suspension)	Arena Ludwigsburg, Ludwigsburg; Attendance: 1,723; Referees: Petrušis, Barysas (LTU)

24 March 2024; 14:00	Ikast Håndbold (Denmark)	31–31	(Germany) SG BBM Bietigheim	Ikast-Brande Arena, Ikast; Attendance: 2,010; Referees: Braseth, Sundet (NOR)
24 March 2024; 14:00	Jeřábková 7	(13–18)	Döll, Smits 6	Ikast-Brande Arena, Ikast; Attendance: 2,010; Referees: Braseth, Sundet (NOR)
24 March 2024; 14:00	1× (yellow card) 2× (suspension)	Report	3× (suspension)	Ikast-Brande Arena, Ikast; Attendance: 2,010; Referees: Braseth, Sundet (NOR)

Ikast Håndbold won 60–58 on aggregate.

16 March 2024; 18:00	RK Krim Mercator (Slovenia)	24–30	(Romania) CSM București	Arena Stožice, Ljubljana; Attendance: 5,230; Referees: Merz, Kuttler (GER)
16 March 2024; 18:00	Dmitrieva 7	(12–18)	Neagu 9	Arena Stožice, Ljubljana; Attendance: 5,230; Referees: Merz, Kuttler (GER)
16 March 2024; 18:00	6× (suspension)	Report	1× (yellow card) 2× (suspension)	Arena Stožice, Ljubljana; Attendance: 5,230; Referees: Merz, Kuttler (GER)

24 March 2024; 16:00	CSM București (Romania)	30–24	(Slovenia) RK Krim Mercator	Polyvalent Hall, Bucharest; Attendance: 4,500; Referees: Vujačić, Kažanegra (MNE)
24 March 2024; 16:00	Neagu 7	(14–13)	Radičević 6	Polyvalent Hall, Bucharest; Attendance: 4,500; Referees: Vujačić, Kažanegra (MNE)
24 March 2024; 16:00	3× (suspension)	Report	3× (suspension)	Polyvalent Hall, Bucharest; Attendance: 4,500; Referees: Vujačić, Kažanegra (MNE)

CSM București won 60–48 on aggregate.

17 March 2024; 14:00	DVSC Schaeffler (Hungary)	28–29	(Norway) Vipers Kristiansand	Hódos Imre Sportcsarnok, Debrecen; Attendance: 2,000; Referees: Lovin, Stancu (ROU)
17 March 2024; 14:00	Szabó 6	(16–16)	Abbingh 13	Hódos Imre Sportcsarnok, Debrecen; Attendance: 2,000; Referees: Lovin, Stancu (ROU)
17 March 2024; 14:00	2× (yellow card) 5× (suspension)	Report	2× (yellow card) 5× (suspension)	Hódos Imre Sportcsarnok, Debrecen; Attendance: 2,000; Referees: Lovin, Stancu (ROU)

23 March 2024; 18:00	Vipers Kristiansand (Norway)	27–27	(Hungary) DVSC Schaeffler	Aquarama Kristiansand, Kristiansand; Attendance: 1,721; Referees: Gasmi, Gasmi (FRA)
23 March 2024; 18:00	Vyakhireva 10	(10–15)	Szabó 8	Aquarama Kristiansand, Kristiansand; Attendance: 1,721; Referees: Gasmi, Gasmi (FRA)
23 March 2024; 18:00	1× (yellow card) 3× (suspension)	Report	1× (yellow card) 2× (suspension)	Aquarama Kristiansand, Kristiansand; Attendance: 1,721; Referees: Gasmi, Gasmi (FRA)

Vipers Kristiansand won 56–55 on aggregate.

== Quarterfinals ==
=== Overview ===
Team 1	Agg.	Team 2	1st leg	2nd leg
Vipers Kristiansand (Norway)	49–54	(Hungary) Győri Audi ETO KC	23–30	26–24
CSM București (Romania)	47–56	(France) Metz Handball	24–27	23–29
SG BBM Bietigheim (Germany)	60–58	(Denmark) Odense Håndbold	30–26	30–32
FTC-Rail Cargo Hungaria (Hungary)	49–55	(Denmark) Team Esbjerg	25–26	24–29

==== Matches ====
27 April 2024; 18:00	Vipers Kristiansand (Norway)	23–30	(Hungary) Győri Audi ETO KC	Aquarama Kristiansand, Kristiansand; Attendance: 2,000; Referees: Konjičanin, Konjičanin (BIH)
27 April 2024; 18:00	Tchaptchet 5	(9–15)	Gros 6	Aquarama Kristiansand, Kristiansand; Attendance: 2,000; Referees: Konjičanin, Konjičanin (BIH)
27 April 2024; 18:00	3× (suspension)	Report	5× (suspension) 1× (red card)	Aquarama Kristiansand, Kristiansand; Attendance: 2,000; Referees: Konjičanin, Konjičanin (BIH)

4 May 2024; 18:00	Győri Audi ETO KC (Hungary)	24–26	(Norway) Vipers Kristiansand	Audi Aréna, Győr; Attendance: 5,209; Referees: Jurinović, Mrvica (SRB)
4 May 2024; 18:00	Gros 6	(15–17)	Roberts 8	Audi Aréna, Győr; Attendance: 5,209; Referees: Jurinović, Mrvica (SRB)
4 May 2024; 18:00	3× (suspension)	Report	3× (suspension)	Audi Aréna, Győr; Attendance: 5,209; Referees: Jurinović, Mrvica (SRB)

Győri Audi ETO KC won 54–49 on aggregate.

28 April 2024; 16:00	CSM București (Romania)	24–27	(France) Metz Handball	Polyvalent Hall, Bucharest; Attendance: 5,000; Referees: Doychinov, Goretsov (BUL)
28 April 2024; 16:00	Neagu 9	(14–15)	three players 7	Polyvalent Hall, Bucharest; Attendance: 5,000; Referees: Doychinov, Goretsov (BUL)
28 April 2024; 16:00	3× (suspension)	Report	4× (suspension)	Polyvalent Hall, Bucharest; Attendance: 5,000; Referees: Doychinov, Goretsov (BUL)

4 May 2024; 16:00	Metz Handball (France)	29–23	(Romania) CSM București	Arènes de Metz, Metz; Attendance: 4,935; Referees: Antić, Jakovljević (SRB)
4 May 2024; 16:00	Grijseels 7	(15–14)	Neagu 6	Arènes de Metz, Metz; Attendance: 4,935; Referees: Antić, Jakovljević (SRB)
4 May 2024; 16:00	4× (suspension)	Report	2× (yellow card) 3× (suspension)	Arènes de Metz, Metz; Attendance: 4,935; Referees: Antić, Jakovljević (SRB)

Metz Handball won 56–47 on aggregate.

28 April 2024; 14:00	SG BBM Bietigheim (Germany)	30–26	(Denmark) Odense Håndbold	Arena Ludwigsburg, Ludwigsburg; Attendance: 2,417; Referees: Praštalo, Balvan (BIH)
28 April 2024; 14:00	Döll 8	(15–12)	Aagot 6	Arena Ludwigsburg, Ludwigsburg; Attendance: 2,417; Referees: Praštalo, Balvan (BIH)
28 April 2024; 14:00	2× (yellow card) 4× (suspension)	Report	1× (yellow card) 2× (suspension)	Arena Ludwigsburg, Ludwigsburg; Attendance: 2,417; Referees: Praštalo, Balvan (BIH)

5 May 2024; 14:00	Odense Håndbold (Denmark)	32–30	(Germany) SG BBM Bietigheim	Sydbank Arena Odense, Odense; Attendance: 2,253; Referees: Weijmans, Wolbertus (NED)
5 May 2024; 14:00	Aagot 7	(17–16)	Dulfer, X. Smits 7	Sydbank Arena Odense, Odense; Attendance: 2,253; Referees: Weijmans, Wolbertus (NED)
5 May 2024; 14:00	2× (yellow card)	Report	2× (yellow card)	Sydbank Arena Odense, Odense; Attendance: 2,253; Referees: Weijmans, Wolbertus (NED)

SG BBM Bietigheim won 60–58 on aggregate.

27 April 2024; 16:00	FTC-Rail Cargo Hungaria (Hungary)	25–26	(Denmark) Team Esbjerg	Érd Aréna, Érd; Attendance: 2,000; Referees: Ilieva, Karbeska (MKD)
27 April 2024; 16:00	Lekić 7	(11–13)	Reistad 10	Érd Aréna, Érd; Attendance: 2,000; Referees: Ilieva, Karbeska (MKD)
27 April 2024; 16:00	1× (yellow card) 3× (suspension)	Report	3× (suspension)	Érd Aréna, Érd; Attendance: 2,000; Referees: Ilieva, Karbeska (MKD)

5 May 2024; 16:00	Team Esbjerg (Denmark)	29–24	(Hungary) FTC-Rail Cargo Hungaria	Blue Water Dokken, Esbjerg; Attendance: 3,143; Referees: Carmaux, Mursch (FRA)
5 May 2024; 16:00	Solberg-Isaksen 6	(17–10)	Klujber 8	Blue Water Dokken, Esbjerg; Attendance: 3,143; Referees: Carmaux, Mursch (FRA)
5 May 2024; 16:00	2× (suspension)	Report	1× (yellow card) 3× (suspension)	Blue Water Dokken, Esbjerg; Attendance: 3,143; Referees: Carmaux, Mursch (FRA)

Team Esbjerg won 55–49 on aggregate.

== Final four ==
The final four was held at the MVM Dome in Budapest, Hungary on 1 and 2 June 2024. The draw was held on 7 May 2024.

=== Bracket ===
Semi-finals
1 June
(Denmark) Team Esbjerg	23
(Hungary) Győri Audi ETO KC	24
1 June
(France) Metz Handball	29
(Germany) SG BBM Bietigheim	36

Final
2 June
(Hungary) Győri Audi ETO KC	30
(Germany) SG BBM Bietigheim	24
Third place
2 June
(Denmark) Team Esbjerg	37
(France) Metz Handball	33

=== Semifinals ===
1 June 2024; 15:00	Team Esbjerg (Denmark)	23–24	(Hungary) Győri Audi ETO KC	MVM Dome, Budapest; Attendance: 13,300; Referees: Braseth, Sundet (NOR)
1 June 2024; 15:00	Mørk 6	(9–13)	Nze Minko 6	MVM Dome, Budapest; Attendance: 13,300; Referees: Braseth, Sundet (NOR)
1 June 2024; 15:00	1× (yellow card) 3× (suspension)	Report	1× (yellow card) 4× (suspension)	MVM Dome, Budapest; Attendance: 13,300; Referees: Braseth, Sundet (NOR)

1 June 2024; 18:00	Metz Handball (France)	29–36	(Germany) SG BBM Bietigheim	MVM Dome, Budapest; Attendance: 12,800; Referees: Vujačić, Kažanegra (MNE)
1 June 2024; 18:00	Burgaard, Valentini 5	(15–14)	X. Smits 9	MVM Dome, Budapest; Attendance: 12,800; Referees: Vujačić, Kažanegra (MNE)
1 June 2024; 18:00	1× (yellow card) 5× (suspension)	Report	2× (yellow card) 2× (suspension)	MVM Dome, Budapest; Attendance: 12,800; Referees: Vujačić, Kažanegra (MNE)

=== Third place game ===
2 June 2024; 15:00	Team Esbjerg (Denmark)	37–33	(France) Metz Handball	MVM Dome, Budapest; Attendance: 14,200; Referees: Weijmans, Wolbertus (NED)
2 June 2024; 15:00	Mørk, Reistad 13	(18–18)	Grijseels 10	MVM Dome, Budapest; Attendance: 14,200; Referees: Weijmans, Wolbertus (NED)
2 June 2024; 15:00	2× (yellow card) 4× (suspension)	Report	1× (yellow card) 3× (suspension)	MVM Dome, Budapest; Attendance: 14,200; Referees: Weijmans, Wolbertus (NED)

=== Final ===
2 June 2024; 18:00	Győri Audi ETO KC (Hungary)	30–24	(Germany) SG BBM Bietigheim	MVM Dome, Budapest; Attendance: 18,500; Referees: Lovin, Stancu (ROU)
2 June 2024; 18:00	Brattset Dale, Gros 6	(17–12)	Hvenfelt 5	MVM Dome, Budapest; Attendance: 18,500; Referees: Lovin, Stancu (ROU)
2 June 2024; 18:00	2× (yellow card) 5× (suspension)	Report	2× (yellow card) 2× (suspension)	MVM Dome, Budapest; Attendance: 18,500; Referees: Lovin, Stancu (ROU)
