= 2023–24 Women's EHF Champions League =

European handball tournament

Women's EHF Champions League
- 2023–24

Tournament information
- Sport: Handball
- Dates: 9 September 2023–2 June 2024
- Teams: 16
- Website: ehfcl.com

Final positions
- Champions: (Hungary) Győri Audi ETO KC
- Runner-up: (Germany) SG BBM Bietigheim

Tournament statistics
- Matches played: 130
- Goals scored: 7486 (57.58 per match)
- Attendance: 387,487 (2,981 per match)
- MVP: (Norway) Stine Bredal Oftedal
- Top scorer(s): (Russia) Anna Vyakhireva (113 goals)

The 2023–24 Women's EHF Champions League was the 31st edition of Europe's premier club handball tournament, running from 9 September 2023 to 2 June 2024.

Vipers Kristiansand were the defending champions but were eliminated by Győri Audi ETO KC in the quarterfinals. Győri Audi ETO KC went on to win their sixth title with a finals win over SG BBM Bietigheim.

== Format ==
The tournament used the same format as the previous three seasons. The competition began with a group stage featuring sixteen teams divided into two groups. Matches were played in a double round-robin system with home-and-away fixtures, fourteen in total for each team. In Groups A and B, the top two teams automatically qualified for the quarter-finals, with teams ranked 3rd to 6th entered the playoff round.

The knockout stage included four rounds: the playoffs, quarter-finals, and a final-four tournament comprising two semifinals and the final. In the playoffs, eight teams were paired against each other in two-legged home-and-away matches (third-placed in group A plays sixth-placed group B; fourth-placed group A plays fifth-placed group B, etc.). The four aggregate winners of the playoffs advanced to the quarterfinals, joining the top-two teams of Groups A and B. The eight quarterfinalist teams were paired against each other in two-legged home-and-away matches, with the four aggregate winners qualifying to the final-four tournament.

In the final four tournament, the semifinals and the final were played as single matches at a pre-selected host venue.

== Rankings ==
This season, the EHF decided to make separate rankings for each club competition. The rankings are based on the performances from the three most recent seasons.

- Associations 1–9 had their league champion qualify for the Group Stage and apply up to two wildcards.
- The Association that won the past season's Women's EHF European League had their league champion and runner up qualified for the Group Stage and applied for one wildcard.
- Associations below the top 9 had their league champion apply for a wildcard.

Rank	Association	Average points	Teams
1	Norway	185.67	1
2	Hungary	172.33	3
3	France	168.33	2
4	Russia	139.00	0
5	Denmark	127.00	3
6	Romania	124.00	2
7	Montenegro	95.00	1
8	Slovenia	84.67	1
9	Germany	64.67	1

Rank	Association	Average points	Teams
10	Sweden	53.50	1
11	Czech Republic	49.00	0
12	Croatia	48.00	0
13	Poland	46.00	1
14	Turkey	22.00	0
15	Spain	18.00	0
16	Serbia	16.00	0
17	Everyone else	0.00	0

== Teams ==
21 teams applied for a place, with nine having a fixed place. For the first time ever, countries were allowed to apply two clubs for a wildcard. The final list was announced in June 20 2023, which included Hungary and Denmark having three participating teams for the first time.

The fixed place for Russia was vacant since the country and its clubs were not admitted to participate in the EHF competitions due to the Russian invasion of Ukraine.

Participating teams
(Denmark) Team Esbjerg (1st)	(Hungary) Győri Audi ETO KC (1st)	(France) Metz Handball (1st)	(Romania) CSM București (1st)
(Denmark) Odense Håndbold (2nd)	(Hungary) FTC-Rail Cargo Hungaria (2nd) ^{WC}	(France) Brest Bretagne Handball (2nd) ^{WC}	(Romania) CS Rapid București (2nd) ^{WC}
(Denmark) Ikast Håndbold (3rd) ^{WC}	(Hungary) DVSC Schaeffler (3rd) ^{WC}	(Slovenia) RK Krim Mercator (1st)	(Poland) MKS Zagłębie Lubin (1st) ^{WC}
(Norway) Vipers Kristiansand (1st)	(Sweden) IK Sävehof (1st) ^{WC}	(Germany) SG BBM Bietigheim (1st)	(Montenegro) WHC Budućnost BEMAX (1st)

- ^{WC} Accepted wildcards

Wildcard rejection
(Croatia) RK Lokomotiva Zagreb (1st)	(France) Neptunes de Nantes (3rd)	(Norway) Storhamar HE (2nd)	(Norway) Sola HK (3rd)
(Turkey) Kastamonu Bld. GSK (1st)			

== Draw ==
The draw took place on 27 June 2023.

== Group stage ==
Location of teams of the 2023–24 Women's EHF Champions League group stage.

The 16 teams were drawn into 2 groups of eight. In regards to Hungary and Denmark, who have three clubs in the Group Stage, a maximum of two clubs from those countries could be drawn into the same group.

In the group stage, teams were ranked according to points (2 points for a win, 1 point for a draw, 0 points for a loss). After completion of the group stage, if two or more teams have scored the same number of points, the ranking was determined as follows:

1. Highest number of points in matches between the teams directly involved;
2. Superior goal difference in matches between the teams directly involved;
3. Highest number of goals scored in matches between the teams directly involved;
4. Superior goal difference in all matches of the group;
5. Highest number of plus goals in all matches of the group;
6. Drawing of Lots

This season, ten national associations were present. For the first time since the 2019–20 season, Poland had a representative, while Sweden returned after a one-season absence.

=== Group A ===
Pos	Team	Pld	W	D	L	GF	GA	GD	Pts	Qualification	GYO	ODE	BRE	BUC	DEB	BIE	BUD	SÄV
1	(Hungary) Győri Audi ETO KC	14	11	1	2	432	356	+76	23	Quarterfinals	—	32–29	32–32	24–26	35–23	31–29	37–19	39–20
2	(Denmark) Odense Håndbold	14	10	1	3	461	359	+102	21	Quarterfinals	30–31	—	29–29	29–25	33–30	42–29	39–24	40–22
3	(France) Brest Bretagne Handball	14	7	3	4	399	367	+32	17 (Note: Brest 54–49 București)	Playoffs	23–24	25–26	—	24–21	38–28	37–30	20–20	28–23
4	(Romania) CSM București	14	8	1	5	414	366	+48	17	Playoffs	23–27	28–24	28–30	—	29–29	31–28	44–26	35–26
5	(Hungary) DVSC Schaeffler	14	7	1	6	394	414	−20	15	Playoffs	29–28	22–35	31–24	23–30	—	26–36	27–22	32–29
6	(Germany) SG BBM Bietigheim	14	7	0	7	414	402	+12	14	Playoffs	26–34	25–28	34–30	26–24	27–31	—	34–16	30–21
7	(Montenegro) WHC Budućnost BEMAX	14	2	1	11	311	433	−122	5		21–29	17–33	21–34	24–29	21–27	22–27	—	31–30
8	(Sweden) IK Sävehof	14	0	0	14	342	470	−128	0		26–29	20–22	20–25	26–41	27–36	29–33	23–27	—

Source: EHF
Rules for classification: Tiebreakers

=== Group B ===
Pos	Team	Pld	W	D	L	GF	GA	GD	Pts	Qualification	MET	ESB	IKA	VIP	KRI	FER	BUC	LUB
1	(France) Metz Handball	14	11	0	3	470	402	+68	22 (Note: Metz 63–60 Esbjerg)	Quarterfinals	—	36–31	36–39	31–29	40–31	25–24	33–22	42–26
2	(Denmark) Team Esbjerg	14	11	0	3	449	412	+37	22	Quarterfinals	29–27	—	37–34	32–37	29–21	27–23	30–28	32–26
3	(Denmark) Ikast Håndbold	14	10	1	3	476	435	+41	21	Playoffs	35–34	34–35	—	30–26	33–32	28–28	30–29	41–29
4	(Norway) Vipers Kristiansand	14	7	1	6	445	403	+42	15	Playoffs	34–36	37–38	31–32	—	29–23	37–26	35–30	28–24
5	(Slovenia) RK Krim Mercator	14	6	1	7	389	384	+5	13	Playoffs	22–28	33–27	28–34	24–24	—	32–26	25–24	32–19
6	(Hungary) FTC-Rail Cargo Hungaria	14	4	2	8	387	408	−21	10	Playoffs	25–38	28–33	37–36	27–35	26–28	—	24–24	35–22
7	(Romania) CS Rapid București	14	4	1	9	366	399	−33	9		31–34	24–33	27–35	30–29	27–22	20–23	—	26–25
8	(Poland) MKS Zagłębie Lubin	14	0	0	14	327	466	−139	0		24–30	24–36	26–35	20–34	18–36	23–35	21–24	—

Source: EHF
Rules for classification: Tiebreakers

== Knockout stage ==
=== Playoffs ===
Team 1	Agg.	Team 2	1st leg	2nd leg
FTC-Rail Cargo Hungaria (Hungary)	59–56	(France) Brest Bretagne Handball	28–30	31–26
SG BBM Bietigheim (Germany)	60–58	(Denmark) Ikast Håndbold	29–27	31–31
RK Krim Mercator (Slovenia)	48–60	(Romania) CSM București	24–30	24–30
DVSC Schaeffler (Hungary)	55–56	(Norway) Vipers Kristiansand	28–29	27–27

=== Quarterfinals ===
Team 1	Agg.	Team 2	1st leg	2nd leg
Vipers Kristiansand (Norway)	49–54	(Hungary) Győri Audi ETO KC	23–30	26–24
CSM București (Romania)	47–56	(France) Metz Handball	24–27	23–29
SG BBM Bietigheim (Germany)	60–58	(Denmark) Odense Håndbold	30–26	30–32
FTC-Rail Cargo Hungaria (Hungary)	49–55	(Denmark) Team Esbjerg	25–26	24–29

=== Final four ===
The final four was held at the MVM Dome in Budapest, Hungary on 1 and 2 June 2024.

==== Bracket ====
Semi-finals
1 June
(Denmark) Team Esbjerg	23
(Hungary) Győri Audi ETO KC	24
1 June
(France) Metz Handball	29
(Germany) SG BBM Bietigheim	36

Final
2 June
(Hungary) Győri Audi ETO KC	30
(Germany) SG BBM Bietigheim	24
Third place
2 June
(Denmark) Team Esbjerg	37
(France) Metz Handball	33

==== Final ====
2 June 2024; 18:00	Győri Audi ETO KC (Hungary)	30–24	(Germany) SG BBM Bietigheim	MVM Dome, Budapest; Attendance: 18,500; Referees: Lovin, Stancu (ROU)
2 June 2024; 18:00	Brattset Dale, Gros 6	(17–12)	Hvenfelt 5	MVM Dome, Budapest; Attendance: 18,500; Referees: Lovin, Stancu (ROU)
2 June 2024; 18:00	2× (yellow card) 5× (suspension)	Report	2× (yellow card) 2× (suspension)	MVM Dome, Budapest; Attendance: 18,500; Referees: Lovin, Stancu (ROU)

== Top goalscorers ==
Rank	Player	Club	Goals
1	(Russia) Anna Vyakhireva	(Norway) Vipers Kristiansand	113
2	(Norway) Nora Mørk	(Denmark) Team Esbjerg	110
3	(France) Sarah Bouktit	(France) Metz Handball	107
3	(Norway) Henny Reistad	(Denmark) Team Esbjerg	107
5	(Romania) Cristina Neagu	(Romania) CSM București	103
6	(Russia) Valeriia Maslova	(France) Brest Bretagne Handball	101
7	(Czech Republic) Markéta Jeřábková	(Denmark) Ikast Håndbold	100
7	(Denmark) Kristina Jørgensen	(France) Metz Handball	100
7	(Hungary) Katrin Klujber	(Hungary) FTC-Rail Cargo Hungaria	100
10	(France) Chloé Valentini	(France) Metz Handball	97

== See also ==
- 2023–24 EHF Champions League
- 2023–24 EHF European League
- 2023–24 EHF European Cup
- 2023–24 Women's EHF European League
- 2023–24 Women's EHF European Cup
