= Ivana Godeč =

Montenegrin handballer (born 2001)

Personal information
- Nationality: Montenegrin
- Born: 11 May 2001 (age 25) Podgorica, Montenegro, FR Yugoslavia
- Height: 1.77 m (5 ft 10 in)

Sport
- Sport: Handball
- Position: Pivot
- Current club: ŽRK Budućnost Podgorica
- Number: 11
National team
Years	Team	Apps	(Gls)
2017–	Montenegro	46	(46)
Medal record
European Championship
Bronze medal – third place	2022 Slovenia/North Macedonia/Montenegro

Ivana Godeč (born 11 May 2001) is a Montenegrin handballer for ŽRK Budućnost Podgorica and the Montenegrin national team.

She represented Montenegro at the 2022 European Women's Handball Championship.
