= Laura Jensen (handballer) =

Danish handball player (born 1999)

Personal information
- Full name: Laura Cecilie Jensen
- Nationality: Danish
- Born: 2 May 1999 (age 27) Grindsted, Denmark
- Height: 1.69 m (5 ft 7 in)

Sport
- Sport: Handball
- Position: Left back
- Current club: Bjerringbro FH
- Number: 25

Youth career
- Years: Team
- 2016-2017: FC Midtjylland Håndbold

Senior clubs
- Years: Team
- 2016–2018: FC Midtjylland Håndbold
- 2018-2020: TTH Holstebro
- 2020-2024: IK Sävehof
- 2024-: Bjerringbro FH
Medal record
Youth World Championship
Silver medal – second place	2016 Slovakia
Youth European Championship
Gold medal – first place	2015 Macedonia
Junior European Championship
Silver medal – second place	2017 Slovenia
- Updated on 13 January 2026

Laura Cecilie Jensen (born 2 May 1999) is Danish handball player, who plays for Bjerringbro FH in the top Danish division, Damehåndboldligaen.

== Career ==
Jensen has represented the Denmark women's national junior handball team at various occasions, such as at the 2015 European Women's U-17 Handball Championship in Skopje, winning gold. She was also part of the team, who won silver at the 2016 Women's Youth World Handball Championship in Slovakia and silver at the 2017 Women's U-19 European Handball Championship in Slovenia.

She started her professional handball career in FC Midtjylland Håndbold. Following two seasons in the club, she signed a two-year contract with local rival TTH Holstebro. In 2020, Jensen transferred to the Swedish champions of IK Sävehof, where she played continuously for four seasons. She won the Handbollsligan in 2022, 2023 and 2024.

In May 2024, she signed a two-year agreement with Bjerringbro FH.

== Achievements ==
- Handbollsligan:
  - Winner: 2022, 2023, 2024
  - Bronze Medalist: 2021
- Damehåndboldligaen:
  - Bronze Medalist: 2017
