= Adrianna Górna =

Polish handball player (born 1996)

Personal information
- Nationality: Polish
- Born: 22 March 1996 (age 30) Kwidzyn, Poland
- Height: 1.71 m (5 ft 7 in)

Sport
- Sport: Handball
- Position: Right wing
- Current club: Metraco Zagłębie Lubin
- Number: 17

Youth career
- Years: Team
- –: MTS Kwidzyn

Senior clubs
- Years: Team
- 2014–2016: UKS PCM Kościerzyna
- 2016–2017: AZS-AWFiS Gdańsk
- 2017–: Metraco Zagłębie Lubin
National team
Years	Team	Apps	(Gls)
2017–	Poland	61	(62)
- Updated on 3 November 2024

Adrianna Górna (born 22 March 1996) is a Polish handballer for Metraco Zagłębie Lubin and the Polish national team.

== International honours ==
- Carpathian Trophy:
  - Winner: 2017
