= Xenia Smits =

German handball player (born 1994)

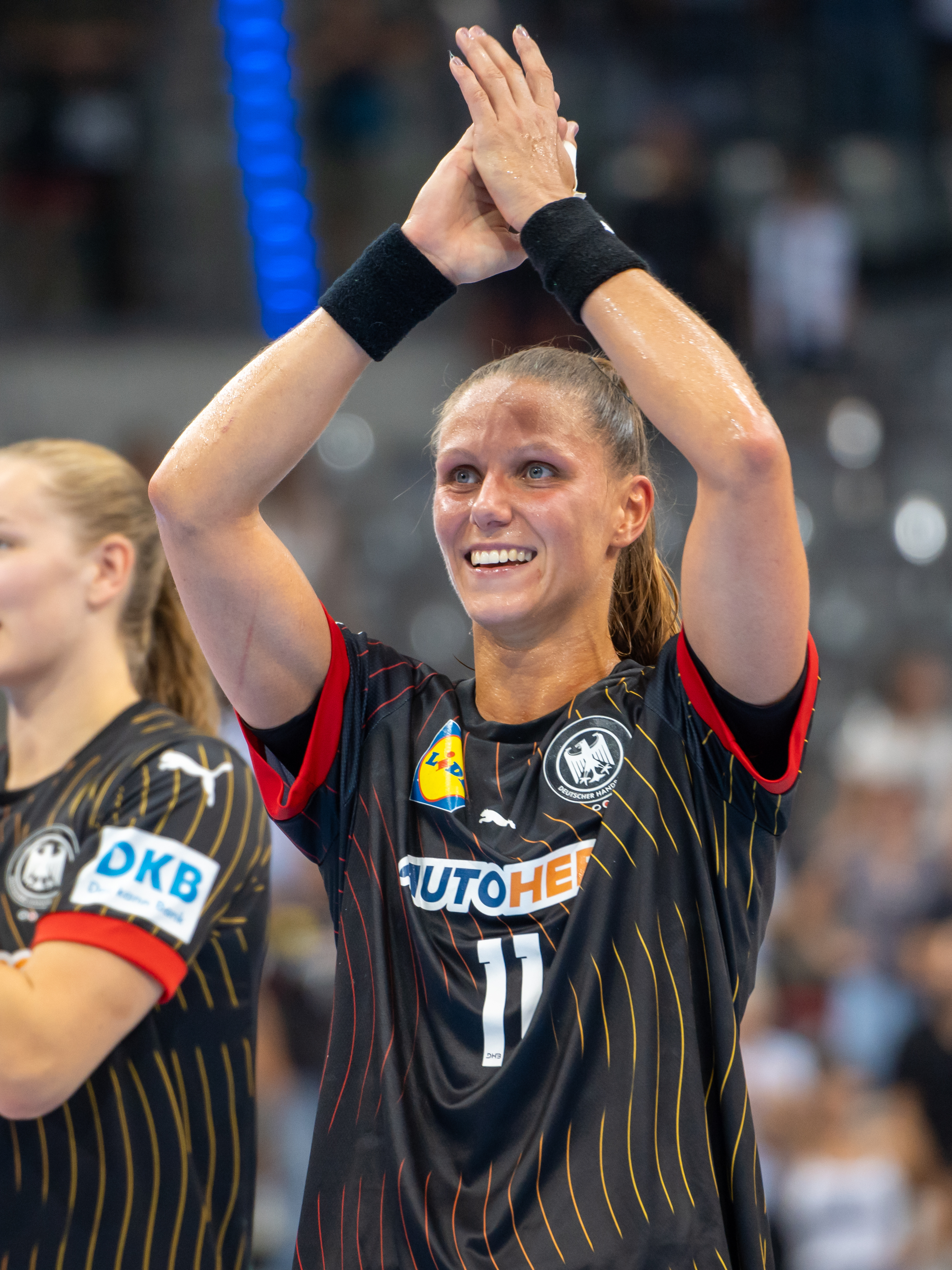

Personal information
- Nationality: Belgian; German
- Born: 22 April 1994 (age 32) Wilrijk, Belgium
- Height: 1.82 m (6 ft 0 in)

Sport
- Sport: Handball
- Position: Left back
- Current club: Metz Handball
- Number: 22

Youth career
- Years: Team
- 2007–2008: HC Rhino
- 2008–2010: HSG Bad Wildungen
- 2010–2013: HSG Blomberg-Lippe

Senior clubs
- Years: Team
- 2010–2015: HSG Blomberg-Lippe
- 2015–2020: Metz Handball
- 2020–2024: SG BBM Bietigheim
- 2024–2025: HB Ludwigsburg
- 2025–2026: Metz Handball
- 2026-: Odense Håndbold
National team
Years	Team	Apps	(Gls)
2014–	Germany	145	(344)
Medal record
World Championship
Silver medal – second place	2025 Netherlands/Germany
- Updated on 7 November 2025

Xenia Smits (born 22 April 1994) is a Belgian-born German handball player for Metz Handball and the German national team.

At the age of 16 she debuted for Bundesliga team HSG Blomberg-Lippe, where she played until 2015. In this period she became a German citizen, and could thus play for the German national team.

She also represented Germany at the 2025 World Women's Handball Championship. Here Germany reached the final, where they lost to Norway. This was the first time since 1994 that Germany made the final of a major international tournament and the first time they won a medal since 2007. At the tournament she had the most steals of any player.

In 2026 she joined Danish club Odense Håndbold.

== Achievements ==
- World Championship:
  - Silver : 2025
- EHF European League:
  - Winner: 2022
- Bundesliga:
  - Winner: 2022, 2023
- LFH Division 1 Féminine:
  - Winner: 2016, 2017, 2018, 2019
- Coupe de France:
  - Winner: 2017, 2019

== Individual awards ==
- French Championship Hope of the Season: 2016
- Championnat de France Best Left Back: 2018
- MVP of the EHF European League Final Four: 2022
