= Markéta Jeřábková =

Czech handball player

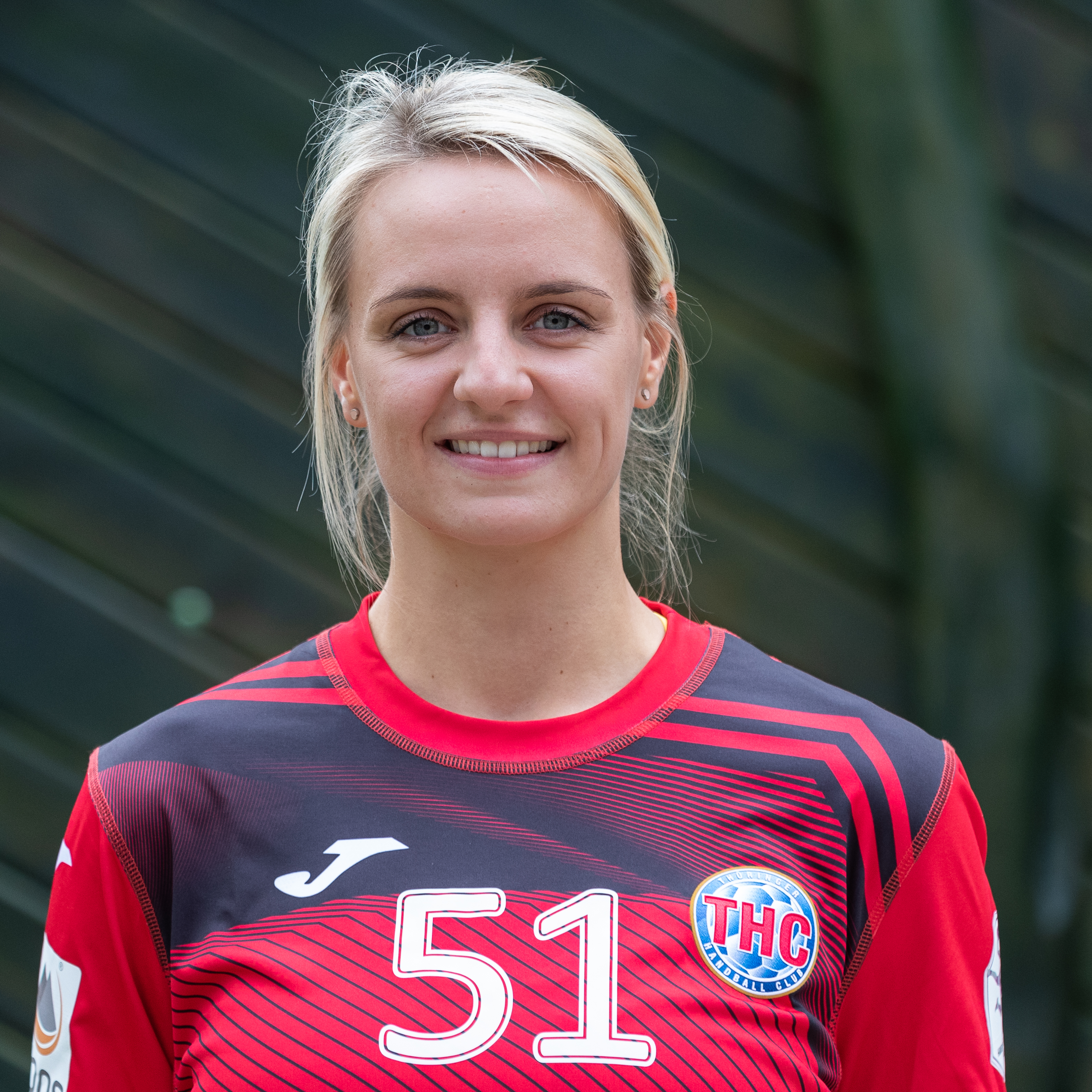

Personal information
- Nationality: Czech
- Born: 8 February 1996 (age 30) Plzeň, Czech Republic
- Height: 1.74 m (5 ft 9 in)

Sport
- Sport: Handball
- Position: Left back
- Current club: Odense Håndbold
- Number: 51

Youth career
- Years: Team
- -2013: HC Plzeñ
- 2013-2014: DHK Baník Most

Senior clubs
- Years: Team
- 2014–2018: DHK Baník Most
- 2018–2020: Érd NK
- 2020–2021: Thüringer HC
- 2021–2023: Vipers Kristiansand
- 2023–2025: Ikast Håndbold
- 2025–: Odense Håndbold
National team
Years	Team	Apps	(Gls)
2014–	Czech Republic	118	(606)

Markéta Jeřábková (born 8 February 1996) is a Czech handballer for Danish club Odense Håndbold and the Czech national team.

== Career ==
Jeřábková started playing handball aged six at her hometown club HC Plzeň. In 2013 she joined the youth team of DHK Baník Most. A day before her 18th birthday she made her senior debut for the club's second team. On 15 February 2014 she made her debut for the 1st team. She won the Czech Championship in every season she played for the club until 2018, where she joined Hungarian Érd NK.

In 2020 she joined German club Thüringer HC. In her first season at the club, she was the Bundesliga top scorer with 250 goals.

In 2021 she joined Norwegian top team Vipers Kristiansand. Here she won the Norwegian Championship and the Champions League in both 2022 and 2023. In the 2021-22 Champions League she was the Final Four MVP with 19 goals in semifinal and final.

In 2023 she joined Danish side Ikast Håndbold on a three year deal. In January 2025 she took a break from handball due to pregnancy, but she returned already in March 2025.

In the summer of 2025 she joined league rivals Odense Håndbold.

=== National team ===
After having played for the Czech youth teams, she made her senior national team debut on 11 September 2014.

She then represented Czechia at the 2015, 2017, 2019, 2021 and 2023 World Championships. At the 2023 World Championship, Jeřábková was the tournament top scorer when Czechia reached the quarterfinal. She participated at the 2016 and 2018 European Championship.

== Achievements ==
- EHF Champions League:
  - Winner: 2021/2022, 2022/2023
- Czech First Division:
  - Winner: 2015, 2016, 2017
- Norwegian League:
  - Winner: 2021/22, 2022/23
- Norwegian Cup:
  - Winner: 2021, 2022/23

== Individual awards ==
MVP

- MVP of the EHF Champions League Final Four: 2022

Top scorer

- Topscorer at the 2023 World Championship (63 goals)
- Topscorer in the 2020-21 Bundesliga (250 goals)

== Private ==
Her father is former Czech soccer player Jaroslav Jeřábek. Her brother is Czech international and Stanley Cup winner hockey player Jakub Jeřábek.
