= Sofia Hvenfelt =

Swedish handball player (born 1996)

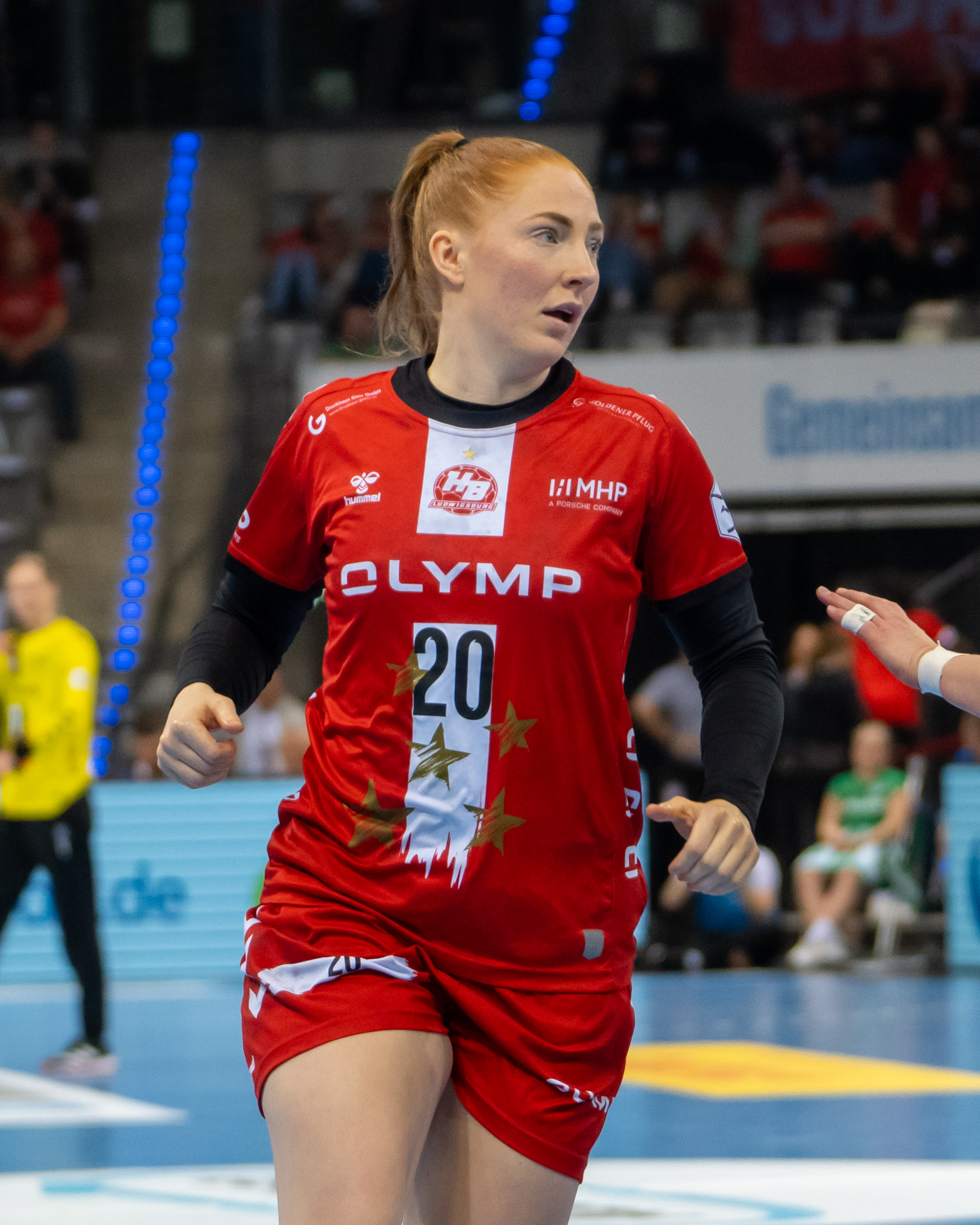

Personal information
- Full name: Sofia Hvenfelt
- Nationality: Swedish
- Born: 23 April 1996 (age 30) Gothenburg, Sweden
- Height: 1.80 m (5 ft 11 in)

Sport
- Sport: Handball
- Position: Line player

Youth career
- Years: Team
- 2013-2014: Önnereds HK

Senior clubs
- Years: Team
- 2014–2016: Önnereds HK
- 2016–2020: H 65 Höör
- 2020–2023: København Håndbold
- 2023–2025: HB Ludwigsburg
- 2026–: Brest Bretagne Handball
National team
Years	Team	Apps	(Gls)
2018–	Sweden	42	(37)
Medal record
Youth Olympic Games
Bronze medal – third place	2014 Nanjing

Sofia Hvenfelt (born 23 April 1996) is a Swedish international handball player.

She made her debut on the Swedish national team on 21 March 2018. She participated at the 2023 World Championship and at the 2024 Summer Olympic where she finished 4th on both occasions.

== Achievements ==
- Elitserien:
  - Winner: 2017
  - Silver Medalist: 2018
- EHF Challenge Cup:
  - Finalist: 2017

== Individuel awards ==
- All-Star Line player of the European Junior Championship: 2015
