= Valeriia Maslova =

Russian handball player

Personal information
- Nationality: Russian
- Born: 23 January 2001 (age 25) Rostov-on-Don, Russia
- Height: 1.88 m (6 ft 2 in)

Sport
- Sport: Handball
- Position: Right back
- Current club: CSM București
- Number: 61

Youth career
- Years: Team
- –2017: Rostov-Don

Senior clubs
- Years: Team
- 2017–2020: Rostov-Don
- 2020–2022: ŽRK Budućnost
- 2022: CSKA Moscow
- 2022–2023: Metz Handball
- 2023–2024: Brest Bretagne Handball
- 2024–2025: Ferencvárosi TC
- 2025–: CSM București
National team
Years	Team	Apps	(Gls)
2018–	Russia	18	(18)

Valeriia Olegovna Maslova (Russian: Валерия Олеговна Маслова; born 23 January 2001) is a Russian handball player for CSM București and the Russian national team.

== International honours ==
- Youth World Championship:
  - Gold Medalist: 2018

== International career ==
Maslova made her international debut for Russia on 31 May 2018, in a qualification game against Portugal. She represented Russia at the 2020 European Women's Handball Championship.
