= Hungary women's national junior handball team =

Hungary

Information
- Association: Hungarian Handball Federation
- Coach: Beáta Bohus

Colours
1st	2nd

Results

IHF U-20 World Championship
- Appearances: 16 (First in 1977)
- Best result: (gold) Champions (2018)

European Junior Championship
- Appearances: 12 (First in 1998)
- Best result: (gold) Champions (2019, 2021, 2023)
- Last updated on Unknown.

Hungary women's national junior handball team
Medal record

World Junior Championship
Gold medal – first place	2018 Hungary	
Silver medal – second place	2001 Hungary	
Silver medal – second place	2003 Macedonia	
Silver medal – second place	2022 Slovenia	
Silver medal – second place	2024 North Macedonia	
Bronze medal – third place	2012 Czech Republic	

European Junior Championship
Gold medal – first place	2019 Hungary	
Gold medal – first place	2021 Slovenia	
Gold medal – first place	2023 Romania	
Silver medal – second place	2002 Finland	
Silver medal – second place	2009 Hungary	
Silver medal – second place	2013 Denmark	

The Hungary women's junior national handball team is the national under-19 handball team of Hungary. Controlled by the Hungarian Handball Federation it represents the country in international matches.

== History ==
=== World Championship ===
Champions Runners up Third place Fourth place

IHF Junior World Championship record
Year	Round	Position	GP	W	D	L	GS	GA	GD
(Romania) 1977	Quarter-finals	6th	5	2	0	3	59	50	+9
(Socialist Federal Republic of Yugoslavia) 1979	Semi-final	4th	7	5	0	2	117	95	+22
(Canada) 1981	Did not qualify								
(France) 1983	Did not qualify								
(South Korea) 1985	Did not qualify								
(Denmark) 1987	Did not qualify								
(Nigeria) 1989	Did not qualify								
(France) 1991	Did not qualify								
(Bulgaria) 1993	Did not qualify								
(Brazil) 1995	Did not qualify								
(Ivory Coast) 1997	Eightfinals	10th							
(China) 1999	Semi-final	4th							
(Hungary) 2001	Final	2nd							
(North Macedonia) 2003	Final	2nd							
(Czech Republic) 2005	Semi-final	4th							
(North Macedonia) 2008	Quarter-finals	5th	10	6	1	3	268	285	−17
(South Korea) 2010	Quarter-finals	5th	11	7	2	2	328	235	+93
(Czech Republic) 2012	Semi-final	3rd	9	6	1	2	241	203	+38
(Croatia) 2014	Quarter-finals	7th	9	7	0	2	241	165	+76
(Russia) 2016	Eightfinals	10th	7	3	0	4	203	189	+14
(Hungary) 2018	Champions	1st	8	8	0	0	242	178	+64
(Slovenia) 2022	Final	2nd	8	7	0	1	266	163	+113
(North Macedonia) 2024	Final	2nd	8	7	0	1	275	181	+94
(China) 2026	Placement games	13th place	7	5	0	2	231	166	+65
Total	16/24	1 Title	89	63	4	22	2471	1910	+571

*Gold background color indicates that the tournament was won.
**Red border color indicates tournament was held on home soil.

=== European Championship ===
Champions Runners up Third place Fourth place

European Junior Championship record
Year	Round	Position	GP	W	D	L	GS	GA	GD
(Poland) 1996	Did not qualify								
(Slovakia) 1998	Quarter-finals	6th							
(France) 2000	Quarter-finals	8th							
(Finland) 2002	Final	2nd							
(Czech Republic) 2004	Did not qualify								
(Turkey) 2007	Quarter-finals	8th							
(Hungary) 2009	Final	2nd							
(Netherlands) 2011	Eightfinals	14th							
(Denmark) 2013	Final	2nd							
(Spain) 2015	Semi-final	4th							
(Slovenia) 2017	Semi-final	3rd							
(Hungary) 2019	Champions	1st							
(Slovenia) 2021	Champions	1st							
(Romania) 2023	Champions	1st							
Total	12 / 14	3 Titles							

*Red border color indicates tournament was held on home soil.

== Team ==
=== Coaches ===
- Antal Berendi (−1998)
- Péter Kovács (1998–2003)
- László Kovács (2003)
- Eszter Mátéfi (2005–2007)
- János Hajdu (2007, 2013–2014, 2017)
- Kálmán Róth (2008–2010, 2011–2012)
- János Gyurka (2010–2011)
- ifj. Szilárd Kiss / György Papp (2015–2016)
- Vladimir Golovin (2018–2021)
- ifj. Szilárd Kiss (2021–2022)
- Zoltán Szilágyi (2022–2024)
- Beáta Bohus (2024–)

=== Previous teams ===
2025 European Championship Team

Team

- Goalkeepers: Gréta Majoros, Boglárka Lukács, Diána Szilágyi
- Left wings: Fanni Bede, Luca Fehér
- Left backs: Anna Szeibert, Liza Pálmai
- Centre backs: Luca Vadkerti, Laura Himer, Polett Rédecsi, Kíra Kriston, Noémi Kacsó
- Right backs: Virág Fazekas, Lilla Somogyi
- Right wings: Luca Ratalics, Korina Teplán
- Line players: Arina Vári, Andjela Vilovski

Staff

- Head coach: Beáta Bohus
- Assistant coach: Balázs Laluska
- Goalkeeper coach: Ákos Vártok

2024 World Championship Team

Team

- Goalkeepers: Klára Zaj, Szofi Imre, Réka Latakos
- Left wings: Anna Szabó, Fanni Török
- Left backs: Anikó Kovács, Krisztina Panyi, Emília Varga, Luca Csíkos, Lea Faragó
- Centre backs: Júlia Farkas, Fanni Horváth, Liliána Csernyánszki
- Right backs:
- Right wings: Léna Gém, Tamara Vártok
- Line players: Lili Szabó, Luca Kövér, Petra Gajdos

Staff

- Head coach: Zoltán Szilágyi
- Assistant coach: Kitti Kudor

2023 European Championship Team

Team

- Goalkeepers: Szofi Imre, Klára Zaj, Virág Mészáros
- Left wings: Anna Szabó, Zoé Makó
- Left backs: Luca Csíkos, Aida Szabó, Emília Varga, Anna Panyi
- Centre backs: Liliána Csernyánszky, Petra Simon, Júlia Farkas
- Right backs: Bianka Kovalcsik, Aida Kurucz
- Right wings: Léna Gém, Dorka Papp
- Line players: Panni Kostyó, Luca Kövér, Lili Szabó

Staff

- Head coach: Zoltán Szilágyi
- Assistant coach: Kitti Kudor
- Goalkeeper coach: Krisztina Szabó

2022 World Championship Team

Team

- Goalkeepers: Anna Bukovszky, Dalma Christe, Panna Zsigmond
- Left wings: Maja Mérai, Míra Vámos
- Left backs: Borbála Ballai, Borbála Besszer, Gréta Juhász, Petra Koronczai, Zsófia Mlinkó
- Centre backs: Anna Kukely, Johanna Farkas, Blanka Kajdon
- Right backs: Diána Ferenczy
- Right wings: Lilla Csáki, Tamara Vártok
- Line players: Luca Faragó, Dorottya Kiss, Lilly Török

Staff

- Head coach: ifj. Szilárd Kiss

2021 European Championship Team

Team

- Goalkeepers: Anna Bukovszky, Kata Németh, Panna Zsigmond
- Left wings: Maja Mérai, Míra Vámos
- Left backs: Petra Koronczai, Gréta Juhász, Borbála Ballai, Borbála Besszer
- Centre backs: Blanka Kajdon, Johanna Farkas, Anna Kukely, Zsófia Mlinkó
- Right backs: Diána Ferenczy
- Right wings: Anna Pálffy
- Line players: Luca Faragó, Barbara Bánhidi, Diána Világos

Staff

- Head coach: ifj. Szilárd Kiss
- Assistant coach: György Papp

2019 European Championship Team

Team

- Goalkeepers: Lili Herczeg, Dóra Szabó
- Left wings: Natalie Schatzl, Zsófia Stanigg
- Left backs: Csenge Kuczora, Fanni Szilovics, Gréta Kácsor
- Centre backs: Petra Vámos, Dóra Kellermann, Tamara Pál, Nikolett Tóth
- Right backs: Anna Albek
- Right wings: Rebeka Arany, Kíra Bánfai
- Line players: Armilla Simon, Luca Zsiborás

Staff

- Head coach: Vlagyimir Golovin
- Assistant coach: Krisztina Pigniczki

2018 World Champion Team

Team

- Goalkeepers: Sára Suba, Boglárka Binó, Petra Hlogyik
- Left wings: Gréta Márton, Csenge Fodor
- Left backs: Noémi Háfra, Gréta Kácsor, Laura Horváth
- Centre backs: Rita Lakatos, Kitti Szabó, Bernadett Hornyák
- Right backs: Katrin Klujber, Laura Pénzes
- Right wings: Dorottya Faluvégi, Bettina Kuti
- Line players: Noémi Pásztor, Petra Tóvizi, Laura Giricz

Staff

- Head coach: Vladimir Golovin
- Assistant coach: Krisztina Pigniczki
- Goalkeeping coach: Béla Bartalos

2017 European Championship team

Team

- Goalkeepers: Boglárka Binó, Petra Hlogyik, Sára Suba
- Left wings: Csenge Fodor, Gréta Márton
- Left backs: Noémi Háfra, Bernadett Hornyák, Anette Emma Hudák
- Centre backs: Dorina Román, Kitti Szabó
- Right backs: Katrin Klujber
- Right wings: Dorottya Faluvégi, Bettina Kuti
- Line players: Laura Giricz, Noémi Pásztor, Petra Tóvizi

Staff

- Head coach: János Hajdu
- Assistant coach: Krisztina Pigniczki

2016 World Championship team

Team

- Goalkeepers: Nóra Gercsó, Kitti Mistina, Alexa Wéninger
- Left wings: Szidónia Puhalák
- Left backs: Fanni Gerháth, Orsolya Monori
- Centre backs: Fruzsina Bouti, Fruzsina Ferenczy, Konszuéla Hámori, Gabriella Tóth
- Right backs: Beatrix Élő
- Right wings: Flóra Katona, Dorottya Faluvégi
- Line players: Laura Szabó, Panna Gindeli, Zsanett Pintér

Staff

- Head coach: Ifj. Szilárd Kiss
- Assistant coach: György Papp

2015 European Championship team

Team

- Goalkeepers: Nóra Gercsó, Kitti Mistina
- Left wings: Júlia Hársfalvi
- Left backs: Fanni Gerháth, Petra Horváth, Dóra Kemény, Orsolya Monori
- Centre backs: Fruzsina Bouti, Fruzsina Ferenczy, Konszuéla Hámori
- Right backs: Anita Csala, Beatrix Élő
- Right wings: Nikolett Diószegi, Dorottya Faluvégi
- Line players: Noémi Pásztor, Zsanett Pintér

Staff

- Head coach: Ifj. Szilárd Kiss
- Assistant coach: György Papp

2014 World Championship team

Team

- Goalkeepers: Blanka Bíró, Annamária Ferenczi, Zsófi Szemerey
- Left wings: Vanessza Hajtai, Dorina Korsós
- Left backs: Krisztina Bárány, Kitti Gyimesi, Mercédesz Walfisch
- Centre backs: Ivett Kurucz, Gabriella Tóth, Noémi Virág
- Right backs: Luca Szekerczés
- Right wings: Viktória Lukács, Krisztina Májer
- Line players: Luca Dombi, Rea Mészáros, Szederke Sirián

Staff

- Head coach: János Hajdu

2013 European Championship team

Team

- Goalkeepers: Blanka Bíró, Annamária Ferenczi, Zsófi Szemerey
- Left wings: Nikolett Buzsáki, Dorina Korsós, Zsófia Szondi
- Left backs: Krisztina Bárány, Dóra Ivanics, Mercédesz Walfisch
- Centre backs: Ivett Kurucz, Gabriella Tóth, Noémi Virág
- Right backs: Éva Schneider, Luca Szekerczés
- Right wings: Viktória Lukács
- Line players: Rea Mészáros, Szederke Sirián

Staff

- Head coach: János Hajdu

2012 World Championship team

Team

- Goalkeepers: Blanka Bíró, Regina Hrankai, Bettina Pásztor
- Left wings: Szonja Gávai, Orsolya Pelczéder, Nadine Schatzl
- Left backs: Dóra Horváth, Kinga Klivinyi, Pálma Siska
- Centre backs: Vivien Kuhinkó, Fruzsina Takács, Eszter Tóth
- Right backs: Szimonetta Planéta
- Right wings: Nelli Such
- Line players: Fruzsina Palkó, Bianka Takács

Staff

- Head coach: Kálmán Róth
- Assistant coach: Vlagyimir Golovin

2011 European Championship team

Team

- Goalkeepers: Regina Hrankai, Annamária Kurucz, Bettina Pásztor
- Left wings: Szonja Gávai, Nadine Schatzl
- Left backs: Dóra Hornyák, Kinga Klivinyi, Pálma Siska
- Centre backs: Barbara Kopecz, Gréta Kovács, Vivien Kuhinkó
- Right backs: Szimonetta Planéta, Luca Szekerczés
- Right wings: Nelli Such
- Line players: Melitta Kaiser, Fruzsina Palkó

Staff

- Head coach: János Gyurka
- Assistant coach: Vlagyimir Golovin

2010 World Championship team

Team

- Goalkeepers: Kinga Janurik, Viktória Oguntoye, Vivien Víg
- Left wings: Babett Szalai, Krisztina Turcsányi
- Left backs: Dóra Deáki, Gyöngyi Drávai, Vivien Léránt
- Centre backs: Bettina Dajka, Anikó Kovacsics
- Right backs: Dóra Hornyák, Anna Kovács
- Right wings: Boglárka Hosszu, Krisztina Tamás
- Line players: Bernadett Horváth, Anett Kisfaludy

Staff

- Head coach: Kálmán Róth
- Assistant coach: Gábor Danyi

2009 European Championship team

Team

- Goalkeepers: Kinga Janurik, Vivien Víg
- Left wings: Babett Szalai, Krisztina Turcsányi
- Left backs: Szandra Zácsik, Dóra Deáki, Gyöngyi Drávai, Vivien Léránt
- Centre backs: Anikó Kovacsics, Bettina Dajka, Tímea Szögi
- Right backs: Dóra Hornyák
- Right wings: Krisztina Tamás, Boglárka Hosszu
- Line players: Bernadett Horváth, Anett Kisfaludy

Staff

- Head coach: Kálmán Róth
- Assistant coach: Gábor Danyi
- Goalkeeping coach: Béla Bartalos

2008 World Championship team

Team

- Goalkeepers: Hajnalka Futaki, Vivien Víg
- Left wings: Viktória Fehér, Patrícia Szölösi, Krisztina Turcsányi
- Left backs: Dóra Deáki, Gyöngyi Drávai, Vivien Léránt
- Centre backs: Bettina Dajka, Anikó Kovacsics
- Right backs: Dóra Hornyák
- Right wings: Krisztina Tamás
- Line players: Krisztina Gulya, Bernadett Horváth, Anett Kisfaludy

Staff

- Head coach: Kálmán Róth
- Assistant coach: Gábor Danyi

2007 European Championship team

Team

- Goalkeepers: Hajnalka Futaki, Andrea Kószó, Brigitta Trimmel
- Left wings: Szilvia Gerstmár, Anita Kazai
- Left backs: Dóra Deáki, Gyöngyi Drávai, Míra Emberovics
- Centre backs: Kitti Kudor, Tamara Tilinger
- Right backs: Adrienn Kovács, Zsófia Lévai
- Right wings: Kata Földes, Dorottya Kolos
- Line players: Anita Cifra, Szabina Mayer

Staff

- Head coach: János Hajdu

2005 World Championship team

Team

- Goalkeepers: Kitti Hoffmann, Annamária Király, Ágnes Triffa
- Left wings: Anett Belső, Gabriella Juhász
- Left backs: Eszter Laluska, Zsuzsanna Tomori
- Centre backs: Renáta Gerstmár, Olívia Kamper, Szabina Tápai, Bernadett Temes
- Right backs: Anett Sopronyi
- Right wings: Bernadett Bódi, Viktória Csáki
- Line players: Barbara Balogh, Piroska Szamoránsky

Staff

- Head coach: Eszter Mátéfi
- Assistant coach: Éva Szarka

2003 World Championship team

Team

- Goalkeepers: Orsolya Herr, Viktória Petróczi
- Left wings: Gabriella Juhász, Edina Orosz, Orsolya Simon, Melinda Vincze
- Left backs: Anita Bulath, Katalin Jenőfi, Renáta Mörtel, Gabriella Szűcs
- Centre backs: Adrienn Blaskovits, Olívia Kamper
- Right backs:
- Right wings: Bernadett Bódi, Renáta Kári Horváth
- Line players: Mariann Sütő, Valéria Szabó

Staff

- Head coach: László Kovács
- Assistant coach: Éva Feketéné Kovács

2002 European Championship team

Team

- Goalkeepers: Orsolya Herr, Viktória Petróczi, Gabriella Tamaskovics
- Left wings: Edina Orosz, Orsolya Simon, Melinda Vincze
- Left backs: Anita Bulath, Katalin Jenőfi, Renáta Mörtel, Gabriella Szűcs
- Centre backs: Adrienn Blaskovits, Ágnes Kocsis
- Right backs:
- Right wings: Bernadett Bódi, Renáta Kári Horváth
- Line players: Valéria Szabó, Katalin Szórádi

Staff

- Head coach: Péter Kovács
- Assistant coach: Éva Feketéné Kovács

2001 World Championship team

Team

- Goalkeepers: Melinda Pastrovics, Viktória Petróczi
- Left wings: Zsuzsanna Gálhidi, Ivett Nagy, Orsolya Vérten
- Left backs: Anita Bulath, Hortenzia Szrnka, Mária Tóth
- Centre backs: Anita Görbicz, Nóra Jókai
- Right backs: Ibolya Mehlmann, Adrienn Őri
- Right wings: Melinda Berta, Renáta Kári Horváth
- Line players: Adrienn Gaál, Cecília Őri

Staff

- Head coach: Péter Kovács
- Assistant coach: Éva Szarka

2000 European Championship team

Team

- Goalkeepers: Melinda Pastrovics, Viktória Petróczi, Tímea Varga
- Left wings: Zsuzsanna Gálhidi, Ivett Nagy, Orsolya Vérten
- Left backs: Hortenzia Szrnka,
- Centre backs: Anita Görbicz, Nóra Jókai
- Right backs: Ibolya Mehlmann, Adrienn Őri
- Right wings: Mónika Grezner, Nóra Povázsay
- Line players: Adrienn Gaál, Cecília Őri

Staff

- Head coach: Péter Kovács
- Assistant coach: Péter Őri

1999 World Championship team

Team

- Goalkeepers: Piroska Bartek, Edina Juhász, Katalin Lancz
- Left wings: Krisztina Hajdu, Viktória Koroknai, Andrea Lőw
- Left backs: Judit Csíkos, Gabriella Kindl, Hortenzia Szrnka
- Centre backs: Judit Pőcze, Edina Rábai, Szilvia Szőke
- Right backs: Beatrix Benyáts
- Right wings: Ágnes Turtóczki
- Line players: Rita Borbás, Katalin Borkowska

Staff

- Head coach: Péter Kovács
- Assistant coach: Péter Őri

1998 European Championship team

Team

- Goalkeepers: Piroska Bartek, Edina Juhász, Katalin Lancz
- Left wings: Krisztina Hajdu
- Left backs: Judit Csíkos, Gabriella Kindl, Hortenzia Szrnka
- Centre backs: Tímea Császár, Judit Pőcze
- Right backs: Beatrix Benyáts
- Right wings: Ágnes Turtóczki
- Line players: Katalin Borkowska, Adrienn Gaál, Andrea Pöltl

Staff

- Head coach: Antal Berendi

1997 World Championship team

Team

- Goalkeepers: Orsolya Kurucz, Katalin Pálinger, Tímea Sugár
- Left wings: Fanni Kenyeres, Dóra Lőwy
- Left backs: Bernadett Ferling, Bea Szilágyi, Annamária Félix
- Centre backs: Eszter Siti, Anett Köbli, Enikő Krista
- Right backs: Nikolett Brigovácz, Krisztina Nagy, Barbara Németh
- Right wings: Mariann Becz (right handed)
- Line players:
- Other players: Krisztina Orosz,

Staff

- Head coach: Antal Berendi

== See also ==
- Hungary women's national handball team
- Hungary women's national youth handball team
