= List of Hungarian women's handball transfers summer 2012 =

This is a list of the Hungarian women's handball transfers for the 2012 summer transfer window. Only transfers that feature at least one Nemzeti Bajnokság I club are listed.

== Transfers by team ==
=== Budapest Bank-Békéscsabai Előre NKSE ===
In

- (Hungary) Viktória Csáki (from Metz Handball)
- (Hungary) Zsanett Hanczvikkel (from Veszprém Barabás Duna Takarék KC)
- (Ukraine) Olha Nikolayenko (from CJF Fleury Loiret HB)
- (Hungary) Bianka Terenyi (from Veszprém Barabás Duna Takarék KC)

Out

- (Hungary) Gyöngyi Drávai (to Kiskunhalas NKSE)
- (Hungary) Hajnalka Futaki (to Siófok KC-Galerius Fürdő)
- (Hungary) Andrea Gerzsényi (to Orosházi NKC)
- (Hungary) Olívia Kamper (to Váci NKSE)
- (Bosnia and Herzegovina) Ivana Ljubas (to RK Zagorje)
- (Hungary) Szilvia Tarjányi
- (Montenegro) Jasna Tošković (to Issy Paris HB)
- (Hungary) Katalin Zsilák (retired)

=== Budapest SE ===
In

- (Hungary) Annamária Barczi (from Eszterházy KFSC-GloboSyS)
- (Hungary) Zsuzsanna Baross (from Váci NKSE)
- (Hungary) Rita Borbás (from UKSE Szekszárd)
- (Hungary) Bozsana Fekete (from Vasas SC)
- (Hungary) Réka Schneck (from ÉTV-Érdi VSE)
- (Hungary) Krisztina Tamás (from ÉTV-Érdi VSE)

Out

- (Hungary) Lilla Halász (to TSV 1880 Gera-Zwötzen)
- (Hungary) Fruzsina Zeck

=== Dunaújvárosi Kohász KA ===
Note that Dunaújvárosi NKS has ceased its operation in the summer of 2012. Their league spot as well as their players were taken by the team of the local handball academy competing under the name Dunaújvárosi Kohász KA. Players who were acquired by the club this way are not listed among the incoming transfers.

In

- (Croatia) Sanela Knezović (from CS Oltchim Râmnicu Vâlcea)

Out

- (Hungary) Ildikó Erdősi (to Siófok KC-Galerius Fürdő)
- (Hungary) Boglárka Hosszu (to Veszprém Barabás Duna Takarék KC)
- (Hungary) Vivien Léránt (to Siófok KC-Galerius Fürdő)
- (Hungary) Barbara Sári (to Yellow Winterthur)

=== DVSC-Fórum ===
In

- (Hungary) Nóra Lajtos (from Siófok KC-Galerius Fürdő)
- (Hungary) Anita Herr (from Siófok KC-Galerius Fürdő)

Out

- (Hungary) Annamária Király (retired)

=== ÉTV-Érdi VSE ===
In

- (Slovenia) Alja Koren (from RK Krim Ljubljana)
- (Croatia) Kristina Franić (from RK Krim Ljubljana)

Out

- (Serbia) Sandra Kuridža (to HC Dunărea Brăila)
- (Hungary) Barbara László (to Eszterházy KFSC-GloboSyS)
- (Hungary) Margit Pádár (to Budaörs-Érdi VSE II)
- (Hungary) Krisztina Tamás (to Budapest SE)

=== Fehérvár KC ===
In

- (Hungary) Fruzsina Azari (from Veszprém Barabás Duna Takarék KC)
- (Hungary) Míra Emberovics (from Veszprém Barabás Duna Takarék KC)

Out

- (Hungary) Fanny Cziráky
- (Hungary) Kitti Gazdag (to Budaörs-Érdi VSE II)
- (Croatia) Ana Maruščec
- (Croatia) Ana Nikšić (to Váci NKSE)

=== FTC-Rail Cargo Hungaria ===
In

- (Spain) Nerea Pena (from Grupo Asfi Itxako)
- (Hungary) Lilla Németh (from Hypo Niederösterreich)
- (Hungary) Luca Szekerczés (from UKSE Szekszárd)
- (Hungary) Orsolya Vérten (from Győri Audi ETO KC)

Out

- (Hungary) Anikó Szabó (to Budaörs-Érdi VSE II)
- (Hungary) Krisztina Szádvári (to Váci NKSE)
- (Serbia) Jelena Živković (to ŽRK Budućnost Podgorica)

=== Győri Audi ETO KC ===
In

- (Hungary) Orsolya Herr (from Siófok KC-Galerius Fürdő)
- (Hungary) Dóra Hornyák (from Veszprém Barabás Duna Takarék KC)
- (Hungary) Viktória Rédei Soós (from Hypo Niederösterreich)
- (Hungary) Ivett Szepesi (from Siófok KC-Galerius Fürdő)
- (France) Raphaëlle Tervel (from Grupo Asfi Itxako)

Out

- (Hungary) Krisztina Bárány (to Veszprém Barabás Duna Takarék KC)
- (Slovenia) Ana Gros (to Thüringer HC)
- (Hungary) Dóra Horváth (to Veszprém Barabás Duna Takarék KC)
- (Hungary) Ivett Kurucz (to Veszprém Barabás Duna Takarék KC)
- (Hungary) Katalin Pálinger (retired)
- (Hungary) Fruzsina Palkó (to Veszprém Barabás Duna Takarék KC)
- (Hungary) Bettina Pásztor (to Veszprém Barabás Duna Takarék KC)
- (Hungary) Orsolya Pelczéder (to Veszprém Barabás Duna Takarék KC)
- (Hungary) Szimonetta Planéta (to Veszprém Barabás Duna Takarék KC)
- (Hungary) Nadine Schatzl (to Veszprém Barabás Duna Takarék KC)
- (Hungary) Eszter Tóth (to Veszprém Barabás Duna Takarék KC)
- (Hungary) Gabriella Tóth (to Veszprém Barabás Duna Takarék KC)
- (Hungary) Orsolya Vérten (to FTC-Rail Cargo Hungaria)
- (Hungary) Vivien Víg (to Veszprém Barabás Duna Takarék KC)
- (Hungary) Noémi Virág (to Váci NKSE)

=== Kiskunhalas NKSE ===
In

- (Hungary) Katalin Borkowska (from Veszprém Barabás Duna Takarék KC)
- (Hungary) Éva Fauszt (from UKSE Szekszárd)
- (Hungary) Kata Földes (from Veszprém Barabás Duna Takarék KC)
- (Hungary) Edit Lengyel (from Veszprém Barabás Duna Takarék KC)
- (Hungary) Sarolta Selmeczi (from Veszprém Barabás Duna Takarék KC)

Out

- (Hungary) Bernadett Toplak (to Pénzügyőr-Spartacus)
- (Hungary) Viktória Kokas (to Veszprém Barabás Duna Takarék KC)
- (Hungary) Nikolett Kurgyis
- (Hungary) Liza Katona (to Váci NKSE)

=== Siófok KC-Galerius Fürdő ===
In

- (Hungary) Ildikó Erdősi (from Dunaújvárosi Kohász KA)
- (Hungary) Hajnalka Futaki (from Budapest Bank-Békéscsabai Előre NKSE)
- (Hungary) Éva Kiss (from Veszprém Barabás Duna Takarék KC)
- (Hungary) Vivien Léránt (from Dunaújvárosi Kohász KA)
- (Croatia) Andrea Šerić (from RK Krim Ljubljana)
- (Serbia) Dijana Števin (from ŽRK Budućnost Podgorica)
- (Hungary) Ágnes Szabadfi (from Veszprém Barabás Duna Takarék KC)

Out

- (Romania) Teodora Bloj (to TusSies Metzingen)
- (Brazil) Karoline de Souza (to Hypo Niederösterreich)
- (Hungary) Anita Herr (to DVSC-Fórum)
- (Hungary) Orsolya Herr (to Győri Audi ETO KC)
- (Hungary) Olívia Kiss
- (Hungary) Adrienn Kovács (to Kispesti NKK)
- (Hungary) Roxána Laczkó
- (Hungary) Nóra Lajtos (to DVSC-Fórum)
- (Hungary) Gréta Mikó (to Budaörs-Érdi VSE II)
- (Hungary) Ivett Szepesi (to Győri Audi ETO KC)
- (Hungary) Dóra Takács

=== Váci NKSE ===
In

- (Hungary) Veronika Farkas (from Veszprém Barabás Duna Takarék KC)
- (Hungary) Rebeka Györkös (from Szent István Építők KC)
- (Hungary) Liza Katona (from Kiskunhalas NKSE)
- (Hungary) Olívia Kamper (from Budapest Bank-Békéscsabai Előre NKSE)
- (Hungary) Szabina Mayer (from Veszprém Barabás Duna Takarék KC)
- (Hungary) Petra Nagy (from Szent István Építők KC)
- (Croatia) Ana Nikšić (from Fehérvár KC)
- (Hungary) Krisztina Szádvári (from FTC-Rail Cargo Hungaria)
- (Hungary) Ágnes Triffa (from UKSE Szekszárd)
- (Hungary) Noémi Virág (from Győri Audi ETO KC)

Out

- (Hungary) Zsuzsanna Baross (to Budapest SE)
- (Hungary) Krisztina Gyetván (to Pilisvörösvári KSK)
- (Slovakia) Katarina Péntek-Dózsa
- (Hungary) Orsolya Szegedi
- (Slovakia) Lucia Uhráková (to DHC Sokol Poruba)

=== Veszprém Barabás Duna Takarék KC ===
In

- (Hungary) Krisztina Bárány (from Győri Audi ETO KC)
- (Hungary) Dóra Horváth (from Győri Audi ETO KC)
- (Hungary) Boglárka Hosszu (from Győri Audi ETO KC)
- (Israel) Amit Izak
- (Hungary) Viktória Kokas (from Kiskunhalas NKSE)
- (Hungary) Ivett Kurucz (from Győri Audi ETO KC)
- (Hungary) Fruzsina Palkó (from Győri Audi ETO KC)
- (Hungary) Bettina Pásztor (from Győri Audi ETO KC)
- (Hungary) Orsolya Pelczéder (from Győri Audi ETO KC)
- (Hungary) Szimonetta Planéta (from Győri Audi ETO KC)
- (Hungary) Nadine Schatzl (from Győri Audi ETO KC)
- (Hungary) Eszter Tóth (from Győri Audi ETO KC)
- (Hungary) Gabriella Tóth (from Győri Audi ETO KC)
- (Hungary) Vivien Víg (from Győri Audi ETO KC)

Out

- (Hungary) Fruzsina Azari (to Fehérvár KC)
- (Hungary) Katalin Borkowska (to Kiskunhalas NKSE)
- (Hungary) Anita Bulath (to RK Podravka Koprivnica)
- (Hungary) Dóra Dublinszki (to Budaörs-Érdi VSE II)
- (Hungary) Míra Emberovics (to Fehérvár KC)
- (Hungary) Veronika Farkas (to Váci NKSE)
- (Hungary) Kata Földes (to Kiskunhalas NKSE)
- (Hungary) Viktória Földes (to Budaörs-Érdi VSE II)
- (Hungary) Zsanett Hanczvikkel (to Budapest Bank-Békéscsabai Előre NKSE)
- (Hungary) Dóra Hornyák (to Győri Audi ETO KC)
- (Hungary) Regina Hrankai (to Eszterházy KFSC-GloboSyS)
- (Hungary) Gabriella Juhász (to Levanger HK)
- (Algeria) Sarah Khouiled (to Nyíradony VVTK)
- (Hungary) Éva Kiss (to Siófok KC-Galerius Fürdő)
- (Hungary) Edit Lengyel (to Kiskunhalas NKSE)
- (Hungary) Maja Letícia Mayer (to Haladás VSE)
- (Hungary) Szabina Mayer (to Váci NKSE)
- (Hungary) Sarolta Selmeczi (to Kiskunhalas NKSE)
- (Hungary) Ágnes Szabadfi (to Siófok KC-Galerius Fürdő)
- (Hungary) Bianka Terenyi (to Budapest Bank-Békéscsabai Előre NKSE)
