= Viktória Kokas =

Hungarian handball player (born 1990)

Personal information
- Full name: Viktória Kokas
- Nationality: Hungarian
- Born: 15 November 1990 (age 35) Győr, Hungary
- Height: 1.67 m (5 ft 6 in)

Sport
- Sport: Handball
- Position: Right Wing
- Current club: Retired

Senior clubs
- Years: Team
- –2009: Győri ETO KC
- 2009–2012: Kiskunhalas NKSE
- loan: → Inárcs-Örkény KC
- 2012–2014: Veszprém Barabás KC
- 2015–2015: Mosonmagyaróvári KC SE

Viktória Kokas (born 15 November 1990 in Győr) is a Hungarian handballer, who retired from professional handball in 2015. Currently she plays at the second division, also she serves as the technical director of Mosonmagyaróvári KC SE.
