= Dajka =

Dajka is a Hungarian surname. Notable people with the surname include:

- Bettina Dajka (born 1990), Hungarian handballer
- Jobie Dajka (1981–2009), Australian track cyclist
- László Dajka (born 1959), Hungarian footballer
- Margit Dajka (1907–1986), Hungarian actress
