= Anna Kukely =

Hungarian handball player (born 2003)

Personal information
- Nationality: Hungarian
- Born: 27 May 2003 (age 23) Békéscsaba, Hungary
- Height: 1.75 m (5 ft 9 in)

Sport
- Sport: Handball
- Position: Centre back
- Current club: Mosonmagyaróvári KC SE
- Number: 17

Youth career
- Years: Team
- 2014–2018: Békéscsabai Előre NKSE

Senior clubs
- Years: Team
- 2018–2022: Békéscsabai Előre NKSE
- 2022–2024: Ferencvárosi TC
- 2024–: Mosonmagyaróvári KC SE
National team
Years	Team	Apps	(Gls)
2023–	Hungary	2	(1)
Medal record
Junior European Championship
Gold medal – first place	2021 Slovenia
Youth European Championship
Gold medal – first place	2019 Slovenia
Junior World Championship
Silver medal – second place	2022 Slovenia
European Youth Olympic Festival
Bronze medal – third place	2019 Azerbaijan

Anna Kukely (born 27 May 2003) is a Hungarian handballer for Mosonmagyaróvári KC SE and the Hungarian national team.

== Career ==
=== Club ===
Anna started her career in 2014 in the Békéscsabai Előre NKSE team. In October 2018, when she was only 15 years old, she made her debut in the senior team of Békéscsabai Előre NKSE in the Nemzeti Bajnokság I match against Siófok KC. In 2018/19, her first top-flight season, she scored 10 goals in 19 games. In the 2020/21 season, she was the most successful player of her team in Nemzeti Bajnokság I (she scored 97 goals in 20 games), but Békéscsabai Előre NKSE was relegated to Nemzeti Bajnokság I/B. In the following season, the team won a gold medal in the Nemzeti Bajnokság I/B, Anna scored 140 goals in 26 matches. In the summer of 2022, she transferred to the Ferencvárosi TC team. She scored 294 goals in 95 senior matches in the Békéscsabai Előre NKSE team. She made her debut in the EHF Champions League in 2022, where she scored 18 goals. Ferencvárosi TC reached the EHF Champions League final, but lost 28–24 to the Norwegian Vipers Kristiansand. At the end of the 2023/24 season, she became champion and cup winner with Ferencvárosi TC. In the summer of 2024, she transferred to Mosonmagyaróvári KC SE, the starting EHF European League team.

=== National team ===
In August 2019, she became Youth European Championship with the women's youth handball team after the Hungary women's national youth handball team defeated the Sweden women's national youth handball team 28–24 in the final. Anna scored 3 goal in the final. In July 2021, he won a gold medal at the Junior European Championship held in Slovenia after the Hungary women's national junior handball team defeated the Russia women's national junior handball team 31–22 in the final. Anna scored 4 goal in the final. In July 2022, she won a silver medal with the national team at the Junior World Championship held in Slovenia, after the Hungary women's national junior handball team lost to the Norway women's national junior handball team 31–29 in the final. Anna scored 3 goal in the final. He made his debut in the Hungarian women's adult national team in April 2023 in Hafnarfjörður, in a World Cup qualifying match against Iceland, where the Hungarian national team defeated the Icelandic national team 25–21. She was included in the large squad of the 2023 World Women's Handball Championship, but in the end he will not become a member of the narrow squad. He was included in the large squad of the 2025 World Women's Handball Championship, but in the end he will not become a member of the narrow squad.

== Personal life ==
Her twin sister, Klára, also plays handball, she plays on the left wing.

== Honours ==
=== National team ===
- Junior European Championship:
  - Gold: 2021
- Youth European Championship:
  - Gold: 2019
- Junior World Championship:
  - Silver: 2022
- European Youth Olympic Festival (EYOF):
  - Bronze: 2019

=== Club ===
Békéscsabai Előre NKSE

- Nemzeti Bajnokság I/B
  - Gold: 2022

Ferencvárosi TC

- Nemzeti Bajnokság I:
  - Gold: 2024
  - Silver: 2023
- Magyar Kupa:
  - Gold: 2023, 2024
- EHF Champions League:
  - Silver: 2023
