= Dóra Ivanics =

Hungarian handball player (born 1994)

Personal information
- Full name: Dóra Ivanics
- Nationality: Hungarian
- Born: 29 June 1994 (age 32) Balassagyarmat, Hungary

Sport
- Sport: Handball
- Position: Left Back
- Current club: Vasas SC
- Number: 17

Senior clubs
- Years: Team
- 2011–2014: Váci NKSE
- 2014–2017: Budaörs Handball
- 2017–2018: Szombathelyi KKA
- 2018–2019: Mosonmagyaróvári KC SE
- 2019–2021: Vasas SC
Medal record
Junior European Championship
Silver medal – second place	2013 Denmark

Dóra Ivanics (born 29 June 1994 in Balassagyarmat) is a Hungarian handballer who plays for Vasas SC.

== Achievements ==
- Nemzeti Bajnokság I/B:
  - Winner: 2018
