= Gréta Juhász =

Hungarian handball player (born 2002)

Personal information
- Full name: Gréta Éva Juhász
- Nationality: Hungarian
- Born: 16 March 2002 (age 24) Tatabánya, Hungary
- Height: 1.80 m (5 ft 11 in)

Sport
- Sport: Handball
- Position: Left back
- Current club: Váci NKSE
- Number: 52

Youth career
- Years: Team
- 2014–2015: Túrkevei VSE
- 2015–2017: Orosházi NKC
- 2017–2018: NEKA

Senior clubs
- Years: Team
- 2018–2020: NEKA
- 2020–2021: Boglári Akadémia-SZISE
- 2021–2024: Kisvárdai KC
- 2024–: Váci NKSE
National team
| Years | Team | Apps | (Gls) |
| 2023– | Hungary | 21 | (31) |
Medal record
European Championship
| Bronze medal – third place | 2024 Austria/Hungary/Switzerland |
Junior European Championship
| Gold medal – first place | 2021 Slovenia |
Youth European Championship
| Gold medal – first place | 2019 Slovenia |
Junior World Championship
| Silver medal – second place | 2022 Slovenia |

Gréta Juhász (born 16 March 2002) is a Hungarian handballer for Váci NKSE and the Hungarian national team.

== Career ==
=== Club ===
Gréta started her career at Túrkevei VSE. In 2015, it was transferred to Orosházi NKC. In the summer of 2017, he joined the National Handball Academy (NEKA) team. From 2018, in addition to the youth championship, he also played a role in the adult team in the Nemzeti Bajnokság I/B. In the spring of 2020, Szent István SE (SZISE) and the National Handball Academy (NEKA) entered into a strategic cooperation, according to which they will start a joint team in the women's handball Nemzeti Bajnokság I in the 2020/21 season. In Nemzeti Bajnokság I, the team started as Boglári Akadémia-SZISE. Gréta scored 34 goals in 26 games in the 2020/21 season, her first top-flight season. At the end of the season, the team was relegated from the first division, but Gréta was signed by Kisvárdai KC, which finished ninth in the league. She scored 57 goals in the 2021/22 season, 83 goals in the 2022/23 season, and 92 goals in the 2023/24 season in the first division. In the summer of 2024, she transferred to the Váci NKSE team starting in the EHF European League. She scored 15 goals in 4 matches in the EHF European League.

=== National team ===
In August 2019, she became Youth European Championship with the women's youth handball team after the Hungary women's national youth handball team defeated the Sweden women's national youth handball team 28–24 in the final. In July 2021, he won a gold medal at the Junior European Championship held in Slovenia after the Hungary women's national junior handball team defeated the Russia women's national junior handball team 31–22 in the final. Gréta scored 1 goal in the final. In July 2022, she won a silver medal with the national team at the Junior World Championship held in Slovenia, after the Hungary women's national junior handball team lost to the Norway women's national junior handball team 31–29 in the final. He made his debut in the Hungarian women's adult national team in April 2023 in Érd, in a World Cup qualifying match against Iceland, where the Hungarian national team defeated the Icelandic national team 34–28. Gréta scored 1 goal. He also participated in the 2023 World Women's Handball Championship as a member of the Hungary women's national handball team. (10th place, 4 matches / 8 goals). She was included in the large squad of the women's handball team participating in the 2024 Paris Olympics, but in the end she was not included in the traveling team. She also participated in the 2024 European Women's Handball Championship, where the Hungarian team finished 3rd (2 matches / 4 goals).

== Honours ==
=== National team ===
- European Women's Handball Championship:
  - Bronze: 2024
- Junior European Championship:
  - Gold: 2021
- Youth European Championship:
  - Gold: 2019
- Junior World Championship:
  - Silver: 2022

=== Club ===
NEKA

- Nemzeti Bajnokság I/B
  - Silver: 2019
