= Michaela Konečná =

Czech handball player

Personal information
- Nationality: Czech
- Born: 6 July 1998 (age 28) Hlučín, Czech Republic
- Height: 1.80 m (5 ft 11 in)

Sport
- Sport: Handball
- Position: Pivot
- Current club: Mosonmagyaróvári KC SE
- Number: 6

Senior clubs
- Years: Team
- 2015–2021: DHC Sokol Poruba
- 2021: Mosonmagyaróvári KC SE
National team
Years	Team	Apps	(Gls)
2018–	Czech Republic	25	(18)

Michaela Konečná (born 6 July 1998) is a Czech handball player for Mosonmagyaróvári KC SE and the Czech national team.

She participated at the 2018 European Women's Handball Championship.
