= Katarína Mravíková =

Slovak handball player (born 1977)

Personal information
- Nationality: Slovak
- Born: 28 December 1977 (age 48) Trenčín, Czechoslovakia
- Height: 1.65 m (5 ft 5 in)

Sport
- Sport: Handball
- Position: Right wing

Senior clubs
- Years: Team
- –: Jaspol Partizánske
- –2001: HK Inter Bratislava
- 2001–2007: Ferencvárosi TC
- 2007–2011: Győri ETO KC
National team
- Years: Team
- –: Slovakia

Katarína Mravíková (born 28 December 1977) is a Slovak retired handballer. She spent most of her career in Hungary, where she won a number of domestic league and cup titles. She also earned the EHF Cup title with Ferencváros in 2006.

== Achievements ==
- Nemzeti Bajnokság I:
  - Winner: 2002, 2007, 2008, 2009, 2010, 2011
  - Silver medallist: 2003, 2006
  - Bronze medallist: 2004, 2005
- Magyar Kupa:
  - Winner: 2003, 2008, 2009, 2010, 2011
  - Silver Medallist: 2007
- EHF Champions League:
  - Finalist: 2002, 2009
  - Semifinalist: 2008, 2010, 2011
- EHF Cup:
  - Winner: 2006
  - Semifinalist: 2005
- EHF Cup Winners' Cup:
  - Semifinalist: 2007
- EHF Champions Trophy:
  - Third placed: 2002
  - Fourth placed: 2006
