= Szidónia Puhalák =

Hungarian handball player (born 1996)

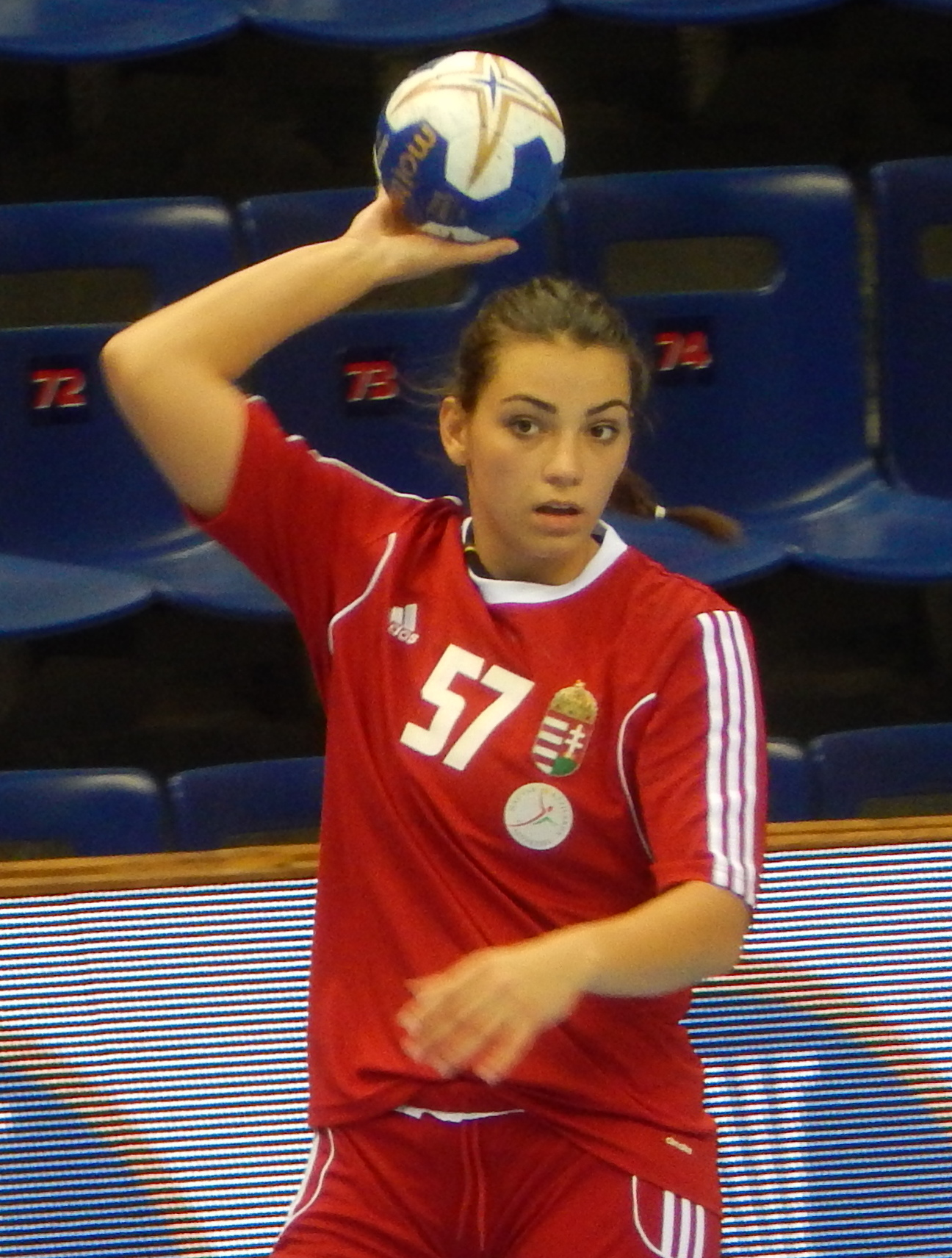

Personal information
- Full name: Szidónia Puhalák
- Nationality: Hungarian
- Born: 5 July 1996 (age 30) Szeged, Hungary
- Height: 1.77 m (5 ft 10 in)

Sport
- Sport: Handball
- Position: Left wing
- Current club: Siófok KC
- Number: 57

Youth career
- Years: Team
- 2013–2014: Váci NKSE
- 2014–2015: Mosonmagyaróvári KC SE
- 2015–2016: Győri ETO KC

Senior clubs
- Years: Team
- 2016–2021: Győri ETO KC
- 2021–2023: Siófok KC
National team
Years	Team	Apps	(Gls)
2018–2021	Hungary	5	(9)
- Updated on 24 March 2019

Szidónia Puhalák (born 5 July 1996) is a Hungarian handballer who plays for Siófok KC.

She made her international debut on 22 March 2018 against Netherlands.

== Achievements ==
- EHF Champions League:
  - Winner: 2017, 2018, 2019
- Nemzeti Bajnokság I:
  - Winner: 2017, 2018, 2019
- Magyar Kupa:
  - Winner: 2018, 2019, 2021
