= Ivett Kurucz =

Hungarian handball player (born 1994)

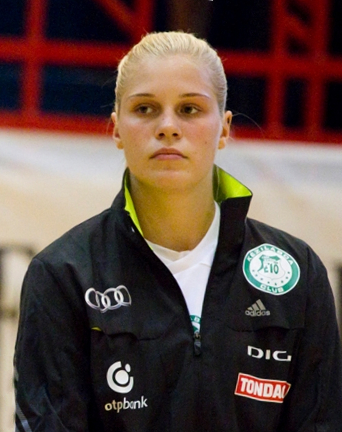
- Kurucz in 2011

Personal information
- Full name: Ivett Kurucz
- Nationality: Hungarian
- Born: 9 May 1994 (age 32) Nagyatád, Hungary
- Height: 1.75 m (5 ft 9 in)

Sport
- Sport: Handball
- Position: Middle Back
- Current club: Csurgói NKC
- Number: 8

Youth career
- Years: Team
- 2006–2008: Nagyatádi NKK
- 2008–2010: Győri ETO KC

Senior clubs
- Years: Team
- 2010–2014: Győri ETO KC
- 2012–2014: → Veszprém Barabás KC (loan)
- 2014–2015: Mosonmagyaróvári KC SE

Ivett Kurucz (born 9 May 1994 in Nagyatád) is a Hungarian handballer, who retired from professional handball in 2015. She plays for Csurgói NKC in the second division.

== Achievements ==
- Nemzeti Bajnokság I:
  - Winner: 2011, 2012
- Magyar Kupa:
  - Winner: 2011, 2012
- EHF Champions League:
  - Finalist: 2012
  - Semifinalist: 2011
