= Krisztina Szádvári =

Hungarian handball player (born 1990)

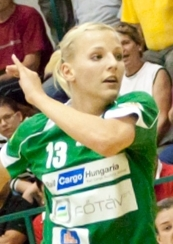
- Szádvári in 2011

Personal information
- Full name: Krisztina Szádvári
- Nationality: Hungarian
- Born: 31 October 1990 (age 35) Kerepestarcsa, Hungary
- Height: 173 cm (68 in)

Sport
- Sport: Handball
- Position: Left wing
- Current club: Gödi SE

Youth career
- Years: Team
- –2006: Váci NKSE

Senior clubs
- Years: Team
- 2006–2007: Váci NKSE
- 2007–2008: Dunaújváros
- 2008–2012: Ferencvárosi TC
- 2012–2014: Váci NKSE
- 2014–2018: MTK Budapest
- 2018–: Gödi SE

Krisztina Szádvári (born 31 October 1990) is a Hungarian handballer who plays for Gödi SE in left wing position.

== Achievements ==
- Nemzeti Bajnokság I:
  - Silver Medalist: 2008, 2009, 2012
  - Bronze Medalist: 2011
- Magyar Kupa:
  - Silver Medalist: 2008, 2010
- EHF Cup Winners' Cup:
  - Winner: 2011, 2012
