= Fruzsina Palkó =

Hungarian handball player (born 1992)

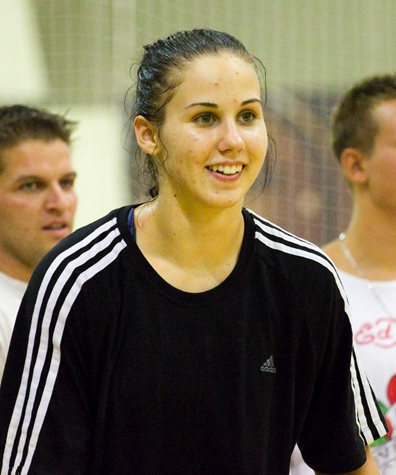
- Palkó in 2011

Personal information
- Full name: Fruzsina Palkó
- Nationality: Hungarian
- Born: 9 February 1992 (age 34) Szombathely, Hungary
- Height: 1.78 m (5 ft 10 in)

Sport
- Sport: Handball
- Position: Line player

Youth career
- Years: Team
- 2004–2006: Szombathelyi ESE

Senior clubs
- Years: Team
- 2006–2009: Szombathelyi ESE
- 2009–2013: Győri ETO KC
- 2012–2013: → Veszprém Barabás KC (loan)

Fruzsina Palkó (born 9 February 1992 in Szombathely) is a Hungarian handballer.

She also competed at the 2012 Women's Junior World Handball Championship in the Czech Republic.

== Achievements ==
- Nemzeti Bajnokság I:
  - Winner: 2010, 2011, 2012
- Magyar Kupa:
  - Winner: 2010, 2011, 2012
- EHF Champions League:
  - Finalist: 2012
  - Semifinalist: 2010, 2011
