= Andrea Gerzsényi =

Hungarian handball player (born 1991)

Personal information
- Full name: Andrea Gerzsényi
- Nationality: Hungarian
- Born: 23 May 1991 (age 35) Gyula, Hungary
- Height: 1.80 m (5 ft 11 in)

Sport
- Sport: Handball
- Position: Left Back
- Current club: Retired

Youth career
- Years: Team
- 2005–2007: Békéscsabai ENKSE

Senior clubs
- Years: Team
- 2007–2012: Békéscsabai ENKSE

Andrea Gerzsényi (born 23 May 1991, in Gyula) is a former Hungarian handballer.

== Achievements ==
- Magyar Kupa:
  - Silver Medalist: 2012
  - Bronze Medalist: 2010
