= Viktória Petróczi =

Hungarian handball player (born 1983)

Personal information
- Full name: Viktória Petróczi
- Nationality: Hungarian
- Born: 27 February 1983 (age 43) Győr, Hungary
- Height: 1.90 m (6 ft 3 in)

Sport
- Sport: Handball
- Position: Goalkeeper
- Current club: Retired

Senior clubs
- Years: Team
- 1998–2007: Győri ETO KC
- 2007–2008: Kiskunhalas NKSE
- 2008–2009: Alcoa FKC
- 2009–2013: U Jolidon Cluj
- 2013–2015: IUVENTA Michalovce
- 2015–2016: Mosonmagyaróvári KC SE
National team
Years	Team	Apps	(Gls)
2006	Hungary	1	(0)
Medal record
Junior World Championship
Silver medal – second place	2001 Hungary	Team
Silver medal – second place	2003 Macedonia	Team

Viktória Petróczi (born 27 February 1983, in Győr) is a former Hungarian team handball goalkeeper. She joined the coaching staff of Mosonmagyaróvári KC SE as a goalkeeping coach in 2019.

== Achievements ==
- Nemzeti Bajnokság I:
  - Winner: 2005, 2006
- Magyar Kupa:
  - Winner: 2005, 2006
- Liga Naţională:
  - Silver Medalist: 2010, 2011, 2012
  - Bronze Medalist: 2013
- EHF Cup Winners' Cup:
  - Finalist: 2006
- EHF Cup:
  - Finalist: 2002, 2004, 2005
- Junior World Championship:
  - Silver Medalist: 2001, 2003
