= Szonja Gávai =

Hungarian handball player (born 1993)

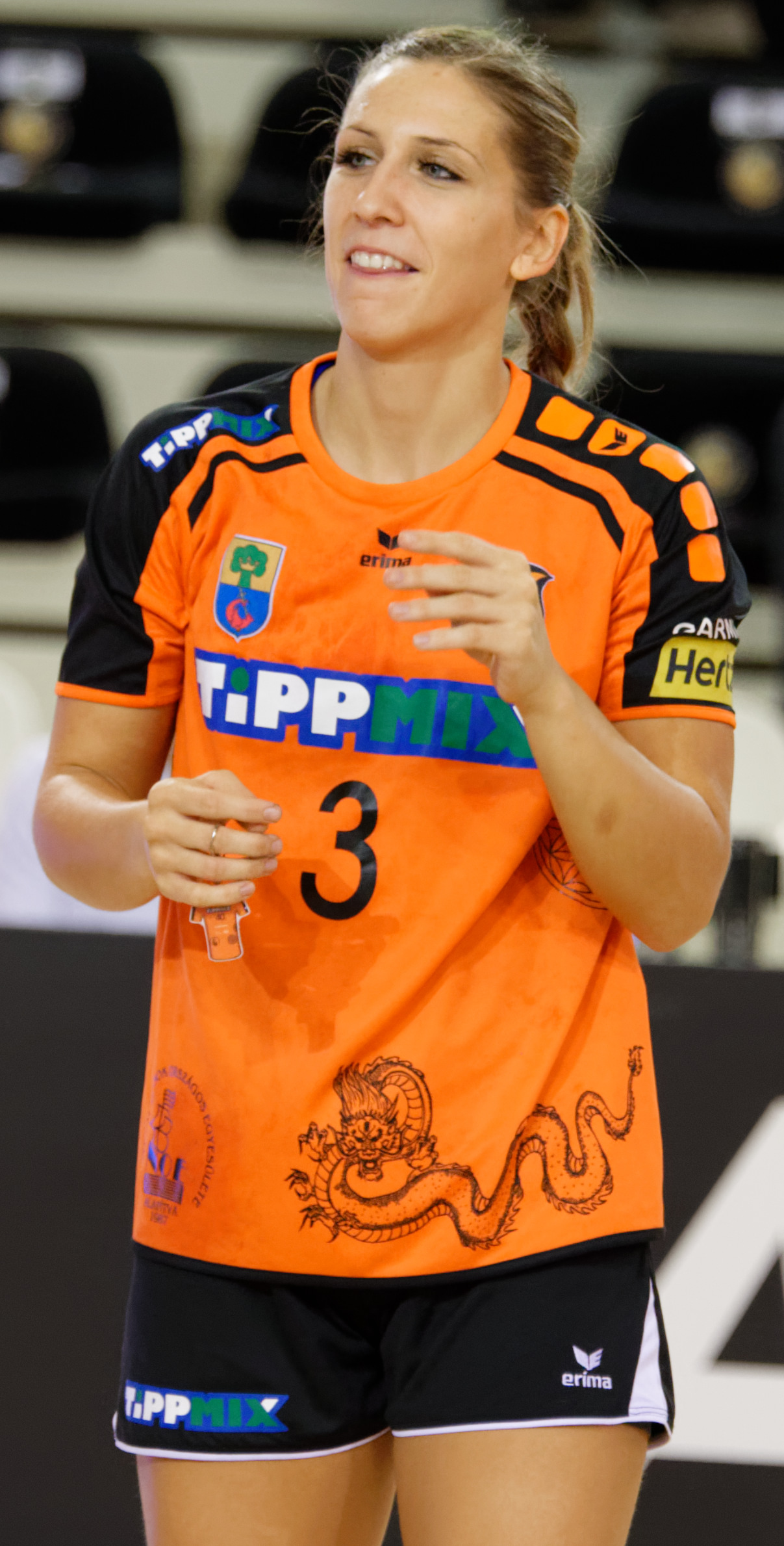
- Nov. 18, 2017

Personal information
- Full name: Szonja Gávai
- Nationality: Hungarian
- Born: 19 August 1993 (age 33) Budapest, Hungary
- Height: 171 cm (67 in)

Sport
- Sport: Handball
- Position: Left wing
- Current club: Érd NK
- Number: 3

Youth career
- Years: Team
- 2007–2009: Békéscsabai ENKSE

Senior clubs
- Years: Team
- 2009–2017: Békéscsabai ENKSE
- 2017–2020: Érd NK
National team
Years	Team	Apps	(Gls)
2017–	Hungary	2	(1)
- Updated on 19 July 2017

Szonja Gávai (born 19 August 1993) is a Hungarian handballer who plays for Érd NK as a left wing.

== Achievements ==
- Magyar Kupa:
  - Silver Medalist: 2012, 2018
  - Bronze Medalist: 2010
