= Krisztina Bárány =

Hungarian handball player (born 1994)

Personal information
- Full name: Krisztina Bárány
- Nationality: Hungarian
- Born: 24 January 1994 (age 32) Győr, Hungary
- Height: 1.89 m (6 ft 2 1/2 in)

Sport
- Sport: Handball
- Position: Left Back

Youth career
- Years: Team
- 2006–2010: Győri ETO KC

Senior clubs
- Years: Team
- 2010–2013: Győri ETO KC
- 2012–2013: → Veszprém Barabás KC (loan)
- 2013–2014: Eszterházy SC
- 2014–2015: Debrecen
- 2015–2018: Szeged KKS
- 2018–2019: Hypo Niederösterreich
- 2019–2020: Kisvárdai KC
Medal record
Junior European Championship
Silver medal – second place	2013 Denmark

Krisztina Bárány (born 24 January 1994 in Győr) is a Hungarian handballer.
