= Hortenzia Szrnka =

Hungarian handball player (born 1981)

Personal information
- Nationality: Hungarian
- Born: 28 May 1981 (age 45) Gyula, Hungary

Sport
- Sport: Handball
- Position: Left back
- Current club: retired

Senior clubs
- Years: Team
- 1996–2000: Békéscsabai Előre NKSE
- 2000–2003: Dunaferr SE
- 2003–2005: Frankfurter HC
- 2005–2006: 1. FC Nürnberg
- 2006–2008: Cornexi Alcoa
- 2008–2009: Debreceni VSC
- 2009–2010: Érd HC
- 2010–2011: Vasas SC
National team
Years	Team	Apps	(Gls)
2001–2004, 2007	Hungary	43	(69)
Medal record
World Championship
Silver medal – second place	2003 Croatia	Team

Hortenzia Szrnka (born 28 May 1981 in Gyula) is a former Hungarian international handball player. She played many years for Dunaferr SE and Fehérvár KC during her career. She played in Germany for Frankfurter HC and Nürnberg HC.

== Achievements ==
- Nemzeti Bajnokság I:
  - Winner: 2001, 2003
- Magyar Kupa:
  - Winner: 2000, 2002
- World Championship:
  - Silver Medalist: 2003
