= Bettina Pásztor =

Hungarian handball player (born 1992)

Personal information
- Full name: Bettina Pásztor
- Nationality: Hungarian
- Born: 1 December 1992 (age 33) Fehérgyarmat, Hungary
- Height: 1.78 m (5 ft 10 in)

Sport
- Sport: Handball
- Position: Goalkeeper
- Current club: Kisvárdai KC
- Number: 12

Senior clubs
- Years: Team
- 2010–2014: Győri ETO KC
- 2012–2014: → Veszprém Barabás KC (loan)
- 2014–2018: DVSC
- 2018–2021: Kisvárdai KC
- 2021–2023: Váci NKSE
- 2023–2024: Békéscsabai Előre NKSE
National team
Years	Team	Apps	(Gls)
2018–	Hungary	2	(0)
- Updated on 22 July 2018

Bettina Horváth-Pásztor (born 1 December 1992, in Fehérgyarmat) is a Hungarian handball goalkeeper who plays for Váci NKSE. She made her senior debut on 2 September 2010 against UKSE Szekszárd.

In 2012, she participated at the 2012 Women's Junior World Handball Championship in the Czech Republic.

She debuted in the national team on 30 May 2018 against Kosovo.

== Achievements ==
- Nemzeti Bajnokság I:
  - Winner: 2011
- Magyar Kupa:
  - Winner: 2011
- EHF Champions League:
  - Semifinalist: 2011
