= Ivett Szepesi =

Hungarian handball player (born 1986)

Personal information
- Full name: Ivett Szepesi
- Nationality: Hungarian
- Born: 4 February 1986 (age 40) Pincehely, Hungary
- Height: 1.67 m (5 ft 6 in)

Sport
- Sport: Handball
- Position: Left Wing
- Current club: Hódmezővásárhelyi LKC
- Number: 24

Senior clubs
- Years: Team
- –2012: Siófok KC
- 2012–2015: Győri ETO KC
- 2015–2016: Mosonmagyaróvári KC SE
- 2016–2017: Szeged KKSE
- 2017–: Hódmezővásárhelyi LKC

Ivett Szepesi (Hungarian: [ˈivɛtt ˈsɛpɛʃi]; born 4 February 1986 in Pincehely) is a Hungarian handballer who plays for Hódmezővásárhelyi LKC in left wing position.

== Achievements ==
- EHF Champions League:
  - Winner: 2013, 2014
- Nemzeti Bajnokság I:
  - Winner: 2013, 2014
- Magyar Kupa:
  - Winner: 2013, 2014, 2015
