= Szederke Sirián =

Hungarian handball player (born 1994)

Personal information
- Full name: Szederke Alexa Sirián
- Nationality: Hungarian
- Born: 1 June 1994 (age 32) Szeged, Hungary
- Height: 1.72 m (5 ft 8 in)

Sport
- Sport: Handball
- Position: Line Player
- Current club: Siófok KC
- Number: 5

Senior clubs
- Years: Team
- 2012–2014: Győri ETO KC
- 2014–2018: Debreceni VSC
- 2018–2020: Dunaújvárosi KKA
- 2020–2021: Mosonmagyaróvári KC SE
- 2021–2022: Siófok KC
- 2022: Ferencváros
- 2022–2023: Siófok KC
- 2023–2024: Vasas SC
National team
Years	Team	Apps	(Gls)
2017–	Hungary	7	(4)
Medal record
Junior European Championship
Silver medal – second place	2013 Denmark

Szederke Sirián (Hungarian pronunciation: [ˈsɛdɛrkɛ ˈʃiriaːn]; born 1 June 1994 in Szeged) is a Hungarian handballer who plays for Siófok KC as a line player.

== Achievements ==
- Nemzeti Bajnokság I:
  - Winner: 2013, 2014
- Magyar Kupa:
  - Winner: 2013, 2014
- EHF Champions League:
  - Winner: 2013, 2014
