= Dóra Deáki =

Hungarian handball player (born 1991)

Personal information
- Full name: Dóra Deáki
- Nationality: Hungarian
- Born: 11 April 1991 (age 35) Győr, Hungary
- Height: 1.87 m (6 ft 2 in)

Sport
- Sport: Handball
- Position: Middle back
- Current club: Retired

Youth career
- Years: Team
- –2007: Győri ETO KC

Senior clubs
- Years: Team
- 2007–2010: Győri ETO KC
- 2010–2013: Ferencvárosi TC
- 2013–2017: Siófok KC
- 2017–2018: Kecskeméti NKSE
National team
Years	Team	Apps	(Gls)
2010	Hungary	3	(0)
Medal record
Junior European Championship
Silver medal – second place	2009 Hungary	Team
- Updated on 19 July 2018

Dóra Deáki (born 11 April 1991 in Győr) is a retired Hungarian handballer.

A Product of the Győri ETO KC youth system, she made her senior debut for the team in 2007.

In 2009, she was member of the Hungarian national team that won silver medal on the Junior European Championship.

== Achievements ==
- Nemzeti Bajnokság I:
  - Winner: 2008, 2009, 2010
  - Silver Medalist: 2012, 2013
  - Bronze Medalist: 2011
- Magyar Kupa:
  - Winner: 2008, 2009, 2010
- EHF Champions League:
  - Finalist: 2009
  - Semifinalist: 2008, 2010
- EHF Cup Winners' Cup:
  - Winner: 2011, 2012
- Junior European Championship:
  - Silver Medallst: 2009
