= Mosonmagyaróvári KC SE =

Hungarian women's handball club

Motherson Mosonmagyaróvár
- Full name: Mosonmagyaróvári KC SE
- Nickname: Óvár
- Short name: MKC
- Founded: 2014; 12 years ago
- Arena: UFM Aréna Mosonmagyaróvár
- Capacity: 1,100
- President: Botond Gáspár
- Head coach: Ferenc Stanigg
- League: Nemzeti Bajnokság I
- 2021–22: Nemzeti Bajnokság I, 5th
- Club colours
Home	Away

Mosonmagyaróvári KC SE is a Hungarian women's handball club. that plays in the Nemzeti Bajnokság I (NBI), the top level championship in Hungary, after gained promotion in 2015.

Since they are sponsored by Samvardhana Motherson Group, the official name for the team is Motherson Mosonmagyaróvár.

== Honours ==
=== Domestic competitions ===
Nemzeti Bajnokság I:

- Bronze: 2020–21

Nemzeti Bajnokság I/B:

- Gold: 2017–18

== Kits ==
HOME
2014–15	2018–19	2019–20	2022–23

AWAY
2014–15	2018–19	2019–20	2020–

THIRD
2014–15	2018–19	2019–20

== Sports Hall information ==
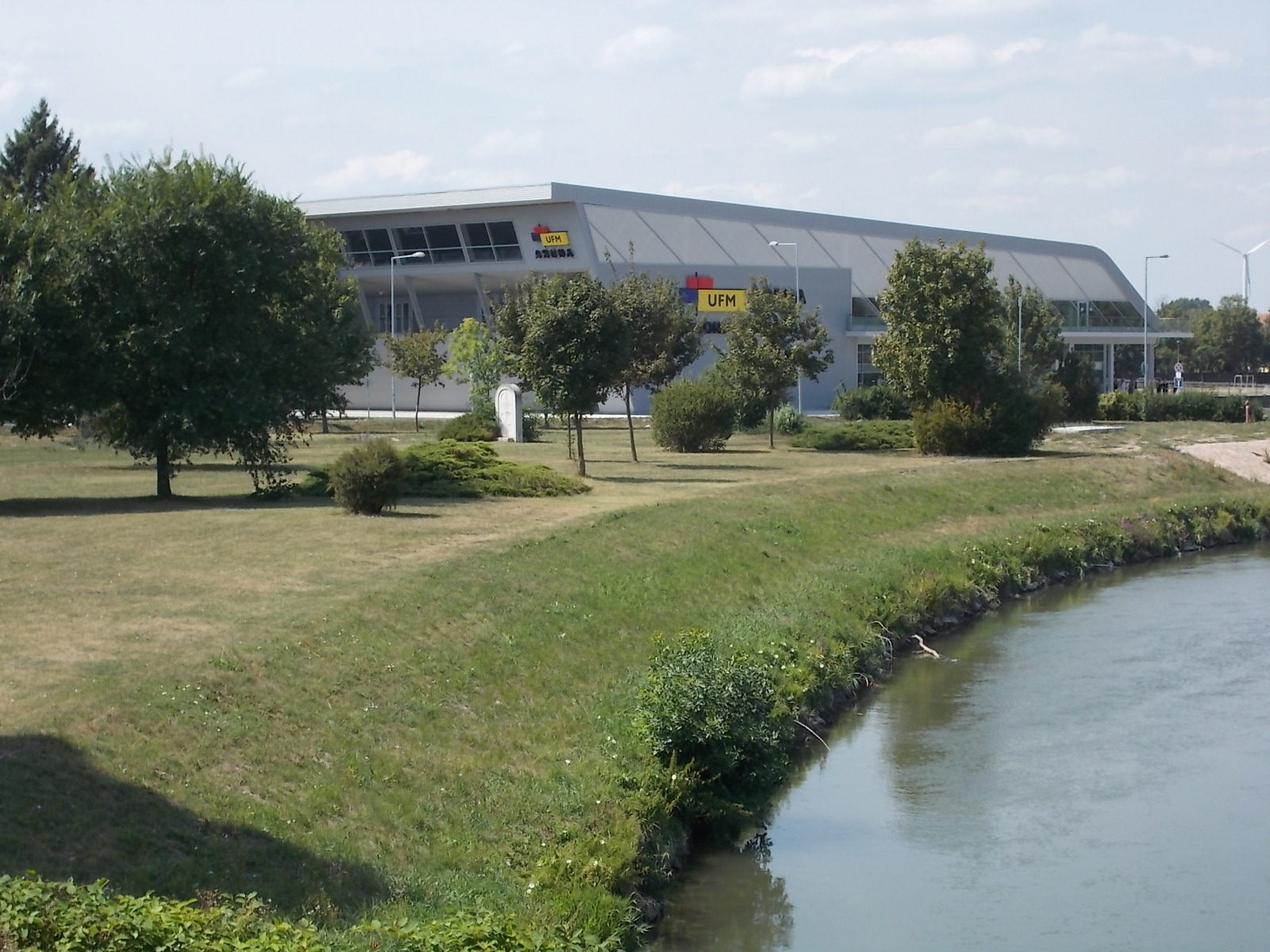
Home hall: UFM Aréna

- Name: – UFM Aréna
- City: – Mosonmagyaróvár
- Capacity: – 1100
- Address: – 9200 Mosonmagyaróvár, Gorkij utca 1.

== Team ==
=== Current squad ===
Squad for the 2026–27 season

Goalkeepers

- 42 (Hungary) Szofi Horváth
- 61 (Hungary) Csenge Csatlós

Wingers
LW

- 34 (Hungary) Anita Kazai
- 66 (Hungary) Zsófia Stranigg

RW

- 7 (Hungary) Laura Falusi-Udvardi

Line players

- 36 (Hungary) Tyiskov-Helembai Fanny
- 32 (Hungary) Noémi Pásztor (pregnant)
- 73 (Hungary) Lili Szabó

Back players
Left back

- 9 (Hungary) Fruzsina Száraz
- 21 (Hungary) Petra Péter
- 44 (Bulgaria) Mari Plamenova Tomova
- 45 (Hungary) Noémi Háfra
- (Hungary) Luca Poczetnyik

Centre backs

- 2 (Hungary) Eszter Tóth
- 17 (Hungary) Anna Kukely
- 25 (Hungary) Bodza Megyeri
- 96 (Hungary) Gabriella Tóth

Right backs

=== Transfers ===
Transfers for the 2026–27 season

Joining

- (Hungary) Noémi Pásztor (PV) (from (Hungary) Szombathelyi KKA)

Leaving

- (Hungary) Dorottya Molnár (RW) to (Hungary) MTK Budapest
- (Montenegro) Andrijana Tatar (LP)
- (France) Mélanie Halter (GK) (to (Germany) HSG Bensheim-Auerbach
- (Germany) Laetitia Quist (RB)

=== Staff members ===
- (Hungary) Chairman: Gáspár Botond
- (Hungary) Club director: István Szász-Fejér
- (Hungary) Head Coach: Ferenc Stranigg
- (Hungary) Goalkeeper coach: Vártok Ákos
- (Hungary) Technical Director:
- (Hungary) Physiotherapist: Edit Benkovics
- (Hungary) Club Doctor: Zoltán Várallyay MD

== Notable former players ==
- (Hungary) Tamara Tilinger
- (Hungary) Flóra Katona
- (Hungary) Gabriella Tóth
- (Hungary) Rita Lakatos
- (Hungary) Mónika Kovacsicz
- (Hungary) Zsófi Szemerey
- (Hungary) Noémi Pásztor
- (Hungary) Nikolett Tóth
- (Hungary) Ivett Szepesi
- (Hungary) Lili Herczeg
- (Hungary) Szederke Sirián
- (Hungary) Bernadett Horváth
- (Hungary) Szidónia Puhalák
- (Hungary) Júlia Hársfalvi
- (Hungary) Viktória Petróczi
- (Hungary) Bettina Dajka
- (Hungary) Ivett Kurucz
- (Hungary) Luca Dombi
- (Hungary) Anna Albek
- (Slovakia) Monika Rajnohová
- (Slovakia) Lucia Gubiková
- (Slovakia) Réka Bíziková
- (Slovakia) Simona Szarková
- (Slovakia) Maria Holesova
- (Slovakia) Barbora Lancz
- (Austria) Ines Ivančok
- (Brazil) Karoline de Souza
- (Brazil) Tamires Morena Lima
- (Brazil) Caroline Martins
- (Brazil) Barbara Arenhart
- (Czech Republic) Jana Knedlíková
- (Czech Republic) Michaela Konečná
- (Romania) Laura Popa
- (Montenegro) Sara Vukcevic
- (Montenegro) Andrijana Tatar
- (Croatia) Lana Frankovic
- (Croatia) Žana Čović
- (Serbia) Sandra Filipović
- (Serbia) Ana Kojić
- (Serbia) Bojana Milić
- (Italy) Irene Fanton
- (Germany) Laetitia Quist
- (France) Mélanie Halter
- (Netherlands) Pipy Wolfs

== Coaches ==
- (Hungary) Kálmán Róth (2014–2015)
- (Slovakia) Tomáš Hlavatý (2015–2016)
- (Hungary) József Varga (2016–2017)
- (Hungary) Róbert Bognár (2017–2020)
- (Hungary) János Gyurka (2020–2025)
- (Hungary) Ferenc Stanigg (2025; 2026–present)
- (Montenegro) Dragan Adžić (2025–2026)

== In European competition ==
- Participations in EHF European League : 5x

Season	Competition	Round	Club	Home	Away	Aggregate
2021–22	EHF European League	Group stage (Group A)	(Norway) Sola HK	25–31	22–27	3rd
2021–22	EHF European League	Group stage (Group A)	(France) ESBF Besançon	38–30	24–34	3rd
2021–22	EHF European League	Group stage (Group A)	(Croatia) RK Lokomotiva Zagreb	28–24	22–19	3rd
2022–23	EHF European League	Round 3	(Romania) SCM Gloria Buzău	29–26	23–25	52–51
2022–23	EHF European League	Group stage (Group B)	(Denmark) Herning-Ikast Håndbold	26–34	26–28	3rd
2022–23	EHF European League	Group stage (Group B)	(France) Neptunes de Nantes	30–33	29–36	3rd
2022–23	EHF European League	Group stage (Group B)	(Norway) Fana	35–29	28–25	3rd
2023–24	EHF European League	Group stage (Group D)	(Spain) CBF Málaga Costa del Sol	25–23	26–29	2nd
2023–24	EHF European League	Group stage (Group D)	(Romania) CSM Târgu Jiu	33–27	22–20	2nd
2023–24	EHF European League	Group stage (Group D)	(Norway) Sola HK	29–34	32–28	2nd
2023–24	EHF European League	Quarterfinals	(Romania) CS Gloria Bistrița-Năsăud	30–32	25–27	55–59
2024–25	EHF European League	Group stage (Group C)	(Poland) MKS Lublin	33–25	29–31	4th
2024–25	EHF European League	Group stage (Group C)	(Germany) HSG Blomberg-Lippe	32–34	28–33	4th
2024–25	EHF European League	Group stage (Group C)	(France) Jeanne d'Arc Dijon Handball	30–36	29–38	4th
2025–26	EHF European League	Round 3	(Greece) OF Nea Ionia	31–17	32–19	63–36
2025–26	EHF European League	Group stage (Group A)	(Romania) CS Minaur Baia Mare			
2025–26	EHF European League	Group stage (Group A)	(Germany) Thüringer HC	36–34		
2025–26	EHF European League	Group stage (Group A)	(Norway) Larvik HK			
