= Annamária Király =

Hungarian handball player (born 1985)

Personal information
- Full name: Annamária Király
- Nationality: Hungarian
- Born: 29 August 1985 (age 41) Debrecen, Hungary
- Height: 1.76 m (5 ft 9 in)

Sport
- Sport: Handball
- Position: Goalkeeper
- Current club: Retired

Senior clubs
- Years: Team
- –2007: Debreceni VSC
- 2007–2008: Derecske KK
- 2008–2009: Nyíradony KK
- 2009–2010: Hódmezővásárhelyi NKC
- 2010–2011: Veszprém Barabás KC
- 2011–2012: Debreceni VSC

Annamária Király (born 29 August 1985) is a retired Hungarian team handball goalkeeper.

== Achievements ==
- EHF Cup:
  - Semifinalist: 2006
