= Vivien Léránt =

Hungarian handball player (born 1990)

Personal information
- Full name: Vivien Léránt
- Nationality: Hungarian
- Born: 5 August 1990 (age 36) Siófok, Hungary
- Height: 1.79 m (5 ft 10 in)

Sport
- Sport: Handball
- Position: Left Back

Youth career
- Years: Team
- –2005: Dunaújváros

Senior clubs
- Years: Team
- 2005–2008: Hypo Niederösterreich II
- 2008–2015: Hypo Niederösterreich
- loan: → DVSC
- loan: → Siófok KC
- loan: → Dunaújváros
Medal record
Junior European Championship
Silver medal – second place	2009 Hungary	Team

Vivien Léránt (born 5 August 1990 in Siófok) is a retired Hungarian handballer. She played regularly for the Hungarian junior national team and was member of the team that won the silver medal on the 2009 Junior European Championship.

== Achievements ==
- Women Handball Austria:
  - Winner: 2009, 2010, 2011
- ÖHB Cup:
  - Winner: 2009, 2010, 2011
- EHF Champions League:
  - Finalist: 2008
  - Semifinalist: 2009
- Junior European Championship:
  - Silver Medalist: 2009
