= Gyöngyi Drávai =

Hungarian handball player (born 1990)

Personal information
- Full name: Gyöngyi Drávai
- Nationality: Hungarian
- Born: 2 January 1990 (age 36) Budapest, Hungary
- Height: 1.83 m (6 ft 0 in)

Sport
- Sport: Handball
- Position: Middle Back
- Current club: Retired

Youth career
- Years: Team
- 2004–2006: Győri ETO KC

Senior clubs
- Years: Team
- 2006–2011: Győri ETO KC
- 2008–2009: → HK IUVENTA Michalovce (loan)
- loan: → Újbuda TC
- 2010–2011: → Békéscsabai ENKSE (loan)
- 2011–2013: Békéscsabai ENKSE
- 2013–2015: Váci NKSE
- 2015–2017: Pilisvörösvár KSK
- 2017–2018: Szent István SE
Medal record
Junior European Championship
Silver medal – second place	2009 Hungary	Team

Gyöngyi Drávai (born 2 January 1990, in Budapest) is a retired Hungarian handballer.

She joined Békéscsaba on loan from Győri ETO KC in July 2010 with an option to buy the player at the end of the season. Békéscsaba used the option and Drávai signed permanently to the Purples in June 2011.

== Achievements ==
- Nemzeti Bajnokság I:
  - Winner: 2007, 2008
- Magyar Kupa:
  - Winner: 2007, 2008
  - Silver Medalist: 2012
- Slovak Championship:
  - Silver Medalist: 2009
- Slovak Cup:
  - Winner: 2009
- Junior European Championship:
  - Silver Medalist: 2009
