= Luca Dombi =

Hungarian handballer (born 1995)

Personal information
- Full name: Luca Krisztina Dombi
- Nationality: Hungarian
- Born: 17 November 1995 (age 30) Békéscsaba, Hungary
- Height: 1.68 m (5 ft 6 in)

Sport
- Sport: Handball
- Position: Pivot
- Current club: Kisvárdai KC
National team
Years	Team	Apps	(Gls)
2016–	Hungary	8	(3)

Luca Krisztina Dombi (born 17 November 1995) is a retired Hungarian handballer for Kisvárdai KC.
