= Míra Emberovics =

Hungarian handball player (born 1988)

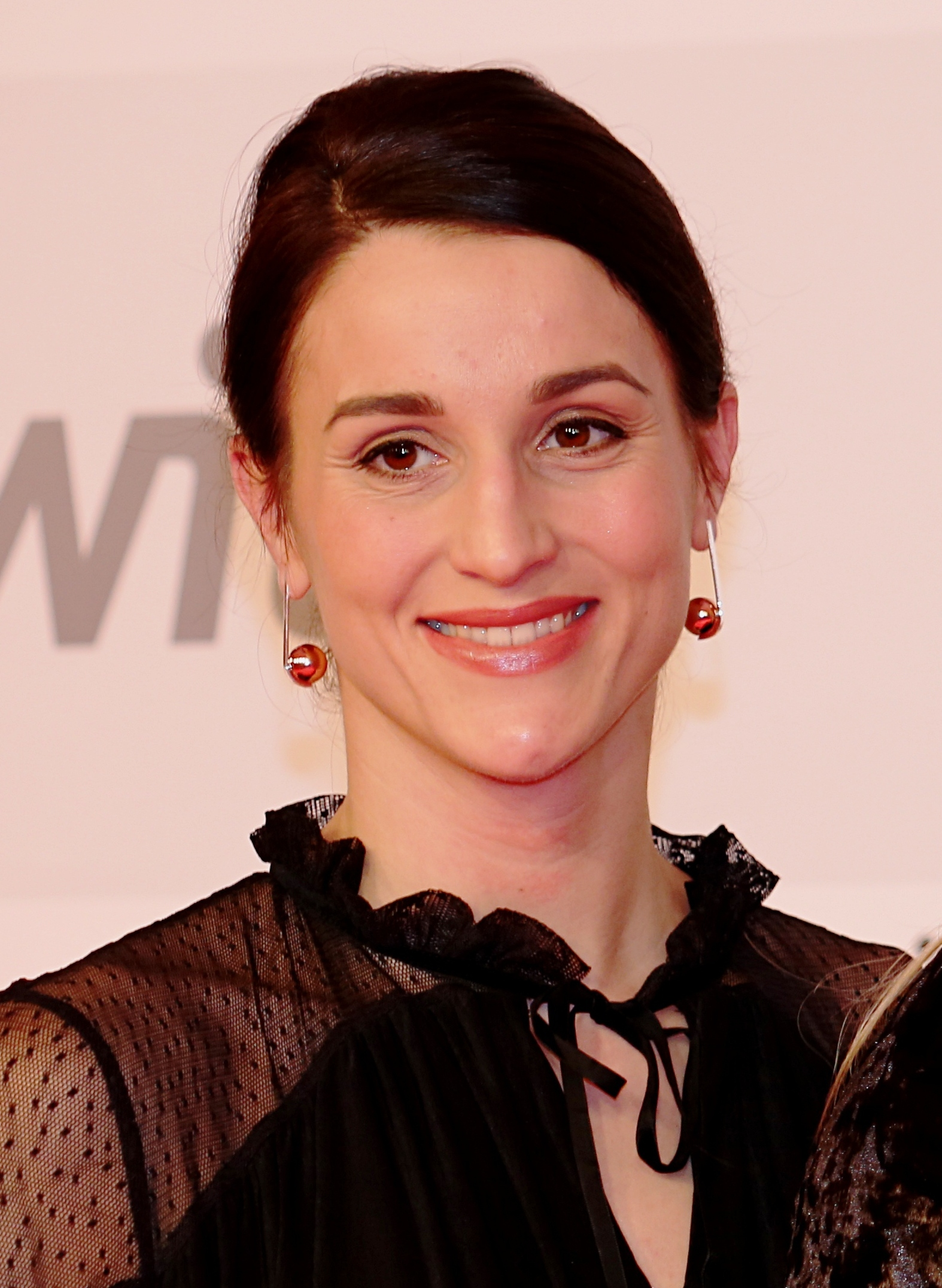

Personal information
- Full name: Míra Emberovics
- Nationality: Hungarian
- Born: 29 July 1988 (age 38) Pécs, Hungary
- Height: 1.78 m (5 ft 10 in)

Sport
- Sport: Handball
- Position: Left Back

Youth career
- Years: Team
- –2005: Pécsi EAC
- 2005–2006: Vasas SC

Senior clubs
- Years: Team
- 2006–2007: Vasas SC
- 2007–2009: Fehérvár KC
- 2009–2010: Ferencvárosi TC
- 2010–2012: Veszprém Barabás KC
- 2012–2016: Fehérvár KC
- 2016–2019: Dortmund Handball

Míra Emberovics (born 29 July 1988 in Pécs) is a former Hungarian handballer.

Emberovics previously played for Veszprém Barabás KC, having joined the club in the summer of 2010, after agreeing a mutual termination of her contract with Ferencváros in June.

== Achievements ==
- Magyar Kupa:
  - Silver Medalist: 2010
