= Vivien Víg =

Hungarian handball player (born 1991)

Personal information
- Full name: Vivien Víg
- Nationality: Hungarian
- Born: 27 February 1991 (age 35) Pécs, Hungary
- Height: 1.73 m (5 ft 8 in)

Sport
- Sport: Handball
- Position: Goalkeeper
- Current club: Kozármisleny

Senior clubs
- Years: Team
- –2009: PTE-PEAC
- loan: → Siófok KC
- 2009–: Győri ETO KC
- loan: → Dunaújváros
- loan: → Dunaújváros
- 2012–2016: → Veszprém Barabás KC (loan)
- 2016–2017: MTK Budapest (women's handball)
- 2017–: Kozármisleny SE ( www.kozarmislenyse.hu )
Medal record
Junior European Championship
Silver medal – second place	2009 Hungary	Team

Vivien Víg (born 27 February 1991 in Pécs) is a Hungarian team handball goalkeeper who plays for Kozármisleny. She was member of the Hungarian team, which finished second on the Junior European Championship in 2009. In addition, thanks to her outstanding performances, she was voted the best goalkeeper of the tournament.

== Achievements ==
- Nemzeti Bajnokság I:
  - Winner: 2010
- Magyar Kupa:
  - Winner: 2010
- EHF Champions League:
  - Semifinalist: 2010
- Junior European Championship:
  - Silver Medalist: 2009

== Awards and recognition ==
- All-Star Goalkeeper of the Junior European Championship: 2009
