= Olívia Kamper =

Hungarian handball player (born 1985)

Personal information
- Full name: Olívia Ella Kamper
- Nationality: Hungarian
- Born: 7 June 1985 (age 41) Budapest, Hungary
- Height: 1.76 m (5 ft 9 in)

Sport
- Sport: Handball
- Position: Playmaker
- Current club: Dabasi KC VSE

Senior clubs
- Years: Team
- 2000–2006: Ferencvárosi TC
- loan: → Vasas SC
- 2006–2007: Vasas SC
- 2007–2009: Fehérvár KC
- 2009–2010: RK Zaječar
- 2010–2012: Békéscsabai ENKSE
- 2012–2014: Váci NKSE
- 2014–2016: Dunaújvárosi NKS
Medal record
Representing Hungary
Junior World Championship
Silver medal – second place	2003 Macedonia	Team

Olívia Kamper (born 7 June 1985 in Budapest) is a former Hungarian handballer. She was previously member of the Hungarian youth and junior national team and achieved her best result in 2003 on the Junior World Championship by winning the silver medal.

== Achievements ==
- Nemzeti Bajnokság I:
  - Winner: 2002
  - Silver Medalist: 2001, 2006
  - Bronze Medalist: 2004, 2005
- Magyar Kupa:
  - Winner: 2001
  - Silver Medalist: 2012
- EHF Cup:
  - Winner: 2006
- World University Championship:
  - Winner: 2006

== Individual awards ==
- All-Star Playmaker of the World University Championship: 2006
