= Hajnalka Futaki =

Hungarian handball player (born 1990)

Personal information
- Full name: Hajnalka Futaki
- Nationality: Hungarian
- Born: 9 June 1990 (age 36) Gyula, Hungary
- Height: 1.80 m (5 ft 11 in)

Sport
- Sport: Handball
- Position: Goalkeeper
- Current club: Retired

Senior clubs
- Years: Team
- 2007–2016: Békéscsabai ENKSE
- loan: → Orosháza KSC
- loan: → Gyulai SE
- loan: → Siófok KC
- loan: → Szeged KKSE
- 2016–2017: Szombathelyi KA
- 2017–2018: Kispest NKK

Hajnalka Futaki (born 9 June 1990 in Gyula) is a former Hungarian handball goalkeeper.

== Achievements ==
- Magyar Kupa:
  - Silver Medalist: 2012
  - Bronze Medalist: 2010
