= Bettina Dajka =

Hungarian handballer (born 1990)

Personal information
- Full name: Bettina Dajka
- Nationality: Hungarian
- Born: 2 October 1990 (age 36) Miskolc, Hungary
- Height: 1.75 m (5 ft 9 in)

Sport
- Sport: Handball
- Position: Middle Back
- Current club: Retired

Youth career
- Years: Team
- –2006: Ferencvárosi TC

Senior clubs
- Years: Team
- 2006–2013: Ferencvárosi TC
- 2013–2014: Siófok KC
- 2014: Szeged KKSE
- 2014–2015: Mosonmagyaróvári KC SE
- 2018–2019: Kecskeméti NKSE
- 2019–2020: Kisvárdai KC
Medal record
Junior European Championship
Silver medal – second place	2009 Hungary	Team

Bettina Dajka (born 2 October 1990 in Miskolc) is a retired Hungarian handballer.

== Achievements ==
- Nemzeti Bajnokság I:
  - Winner: 2007
  - Silver Medalist: 2009, 2012
  - Bronze Medalist: 2008, 2011
- Magyar Kupa:
  - Silver Medalist: 2010
- EHF Cup Winners' Cup:
  - Winner: 2011, 2012
  - Semifinalist: 2007
- Junior European Championship:
  - Silver Medalist: 2009
