= Győri ETO KC =

Hungarian women's handball club

Győri Audi ETO KC
- Full name: Győri Egyetértés Torna Osztály Kézilabda Club
- Short name: Győr
- Founded: 1948; 78 years ago
- Arena: Audi Aréna
- Capacity: 5,500 seats
- President: Anita Görbicz
- Head coach: Per Johansson
- Captain: Kari Brattset Dale
- League: Nemzeti Bajnokság I
- 2025–26: Nemzeti Bajnokság I, 1st
- Club colours
| Home | Away |

Győri ETO KC (Hungarian: Győri Egyetértés Torna Osztály Kézilabda Club, lit. Concordance Gymnastics Department of Győr Handball Club) is a Hungarian women's handball club from Győr. Since they are sponsored by Audi, the official name for the team is Győri Audi ETO KC.

On domestic level ETO won 19 Hungarian Championship titles, including seven in a row between 2008 and 2014. They are also a sixteen-time Hungarian Cup winners, having won all their finals between 2005 and 2016.

ETO won the Champions League 7 times (in 2013, 2014, 2017, 2018, 2019, 2024, and 2025). The team also reached the final in 2009, 2012, 2016, 2022, and in 2026. In addition, Győr reached the final of the EHF Cup Winners' Cup in 2006 and the final of the EHF Cup in 1999, 2002, 2004, and 2005.

Location of Győri Audi ETO KC

== History ==
=== The first golden era ===
The ETO was founded in 1904, but the women's handball section was not created until 1948. The first edition of the Hungarian Championship was held in 1951.

President János Lang and department leader Vilmos Joósz started to build the first "golden team" in the mid-fifties. The members of the first team that succeeded were Magdolna Matulay, Ilona Dittrich, Magdolna Novák, Ilona Szalai, and Éva Boudny. At the beginning, the coach of the team was Pál Kellner, but he emigrated to Sweden after the 1956 revolution, so the team was in a need for a new coach. Károly Varga took over the responsibility, but after the summer break, he was replaced by László Stéger.

In 1957, ETO won their first Hungarian Championship title - in their first season playing in the top level championship - after a victory in the final round against Goldberger. Multiple players missed the 1958 Championship due to pregnancy, therefore the team finished at the disappointing eighth position. The new year however brought success again, thanks to signing one of the greatest players of the era, Magda Jóna. ETO won the 1959 Championship, while Jóna became the topscorer with 225 goals scored. The successful performance continued, in 1960 they finished second behind Bp. Spartacus.

=== Towards the end ===
After Magda Jóna left the team in 1960, the success seemed to avoid the club as well. Between 1961 and 1965, ETO reached only a fourth and an eleventh position, while László Stéger left the bench. His replacement was Jenő Kheim. In 1966, ETO finished 13th and was relegated from the Nemzeti Bajnokság I. They gained promotion to the first league once more for a season, but could not make their good run last long, since they were relegated even from the third division. The club of ETO decided to terminate the handball department.

=== More than a decade without ETO ===
Between 1980 and 1992, the handball team in Győr went through several struggles. They either played in the lower championships or were considered as a "middle team" in the first league. There were several name changes in the club's life, including Győri Vasas or Győri Richards. In 1992, Győri ETO Kézilabda Club was established, which was owned by the Municipality of Győr. The president was Attila Vanyus (between 1992 and 2012), who built up the successful club we know today with his persistent, hard work.

=== ETO has returned ===
Since 1993, Győri ETO had assembled a strong team featuring Mariann Horváth, Beáta Hoffmann, Anikó Nagy, Gabriella Szabados, Eszter Mátéfi, and Anna Szántó. The club finished fifth in the league, and Eszter Mátéfi became the top scorer of Nemzeti Bajnokság I. In 1994, Kálmán Róth took over as head coach. Under his direction, Győri ETO played its first European Cup match in the City Cup against the Swiss side ZMC Zürich. Katalin Pálinger, Krisztina Pigniczki, and Anita Kulcsár later became important players for both the club and the Hungarian national team.

ETO played in the EHF Cup for the first time in the 1998/99 season. They reached the final, but fell short against the more powerful Danish side, Viborg HK.

=== First season in the Champions League, another success on European level ===
After playing in lower tier European competitions for a couple of years, ETO got to debut in the top tier, also known as the Champions League in the 2000/01 season after beating Polish MKS Lublin in Round 2 of qualification. They could not go through from the group phase with one victory, two draws and three losses, on the other hand they finished third in the Nemzeti Bajnokság I. Important players left the team, so the staff decided to fill up the empty gaps with players from their own youth team. Players like Anita Görbicz, Ibolya Mehlmann, Viktória Petróczi, and Gabriella Kindl.

In 2002, ETO played the final of the EHF Cup against Ikast (53–61 on aggregate), then the semifinal of Cup Winners' Cup in 2003 against ESBF Besançon (45–56 on aggregate) and the 2004 EHF Cup final against Viborg HK (48–64 on aggregate), while more young players joined the squad, like Bernadett Bódi, Orsolya Herr, Renáta Mörtel, Bernadett Temes or Gabriella Juhász.

In 2005, ETO strengthened their team with Romanian internationals; Aurelia Brădeanu and Simona Gogîrlă. In the Hungarian Championship ETO was able to win the title after an exciting fight against Dunaferr, which meant that the gold medal returned to Győr after 46 years.

=== 2005–2012 Dominance in Hungary ===
Since 2005, the club is sponsored by Audi, therefore the official name for the team is Győri Audi ETO KC. With the help of their new sponsor, they won six Hungarian Championship titles and seven Hungarian Cup during seven seasons.

In the European Cups they first failed to qualify for Champions League 2004/05 season after losing to Ukrainian Motor Zaporizhzhia in the qualifiers, but they reached the final of EHF Cup in the meantime, after beating Polish SPR Lublin in Round 3 of qualification, Norwegian Våg Vipers in the 1/8 finals, Romania HC Zalău in the quarterfinals and German HC Leipzig in the semifinals, however they fell short against Hungarian rivals, Alcoa FKC. Then ETO also lost the final of EHF Cup Winners' Cup in 2006, where they lost against ŽRK Budućnost Podgorica from Serbia and Montenegro, 48–51 on aggregate.

In 2009, Győri ETO reached the final of the Champions League for the first time, meeting Danish champion Viborg HK. In the semifinals they triumphed against Austrian record champion and 8-time CL winner Hypo Niederösterreich, 54–47 on aggregate. Due to a knee injury suffered days before the first leg, captain Anita Görbicz couldn't take part in the finals. Győr won the first match away 26–24, however was defeated at Veszprém Aréna 23–26, a venue that substituted for their home soil. ETO players missed nine penalties combined in the finals. A season later they lost the semifinals of the most prestigious European competition against Oltchim Râmnicu Vâlcea 45–49 on aggregate, then another year later another semifinal duel turned out unsuccessful opposite to Spanish Itxako Navarra, 50–45 on aggregate.

In 2012, the team made it to the Champions League finals again, this time felling short to ŽRK Budućnost Podgorica on the away goals rule. ETO won the first leg on home soil to 29–27, while their Montenegrin opponent achieved a 27–25 victory in the rematch which was just enough for them to gain the title. Not even Göbricz's 21 goals scored in the finals combined were sufficient. ETO's bad luck seemed to continue internationally, as this final was the seventh on European level they lost, out of the seven finals they have reached. In the meantime their dominance in Hungary was not questionable.

During this period both Hungarian and foreign handball talents and stars wore the green and white jersey, such as Anikó Kovacsics, Zsuzsanna Tomori, Eduarda Amorim, Katrine Lunde, Heidi Løke, Ana Gros, Andrea Lekić, and Jovanka Radičević.

=== 2012–2019 Reaching the top, long awaited triumph – Five Champions League titles ===
For the 2012/13 season, coach Ambros Martín joined the squad and have worked with the team for six years. ETO reached the final of the Champions League and could finally win after seven lost European cup finals with the help of the Spaniard. They were able to win a thrilling semifinal rematch against Oltchim Vâlcea, where the guest Romanian team were leading in the 51st minute even with six goals. The last ten minutes of the match were incredible from Győr's point of view, because they were able to come back to the match and lose with only one goal. Considering they have won their first match in Romania with two goals, the loss meant that they have made it to the final. Tables have turned, ETO won 48–47 on aggregate, and as a result they had to face the Norwegian powerhouse Larvik HK for the trophy. After a victory in Norway (24–21), they won the rematch and the title at the same time in the Veszprém Aréna. Görbicz and Løke led the team with 12 and 11 goals scored respectively in the two matches combined. Since 2014 the winner of the Champions League have been decided in a Final Four tournament. ETO defended their title, which meant they won the last title in the old format and the first in the new one.

In the Ambros Martín era (2012–2018) ETO won 4 Champions League titles (in 2013 against Larvik, in 2014 against Budućnost, in 2017 against HC Vardar and in 2018 once again against HC Vardar) and lost one final (in 2016 against CSM București). Except for the 2014 final against Budućnost, which ended with a 27–21 ETO victory (with the top scorer being Anita Görbicz with seven goals), all the finals of Martín led Győr had a thriller of an ending. The aforementioned match will forever be memorable due to its heated atmosphere, which was the results of the two teams' previous match in the main round played on 9 March 2014. The game in question did not just end in a draw, but there was a particular scene in the last seconds that caused wide spread media attention and shock within the handball community, as Milena Knežević, the centre back of the Montenegrin team head-butted Görbicz. The intentionality of the act was beyond question, and the EHF punished her with a 2-match ban. The ban expired for the final, so the player was able to play there, and ended up hitting the net twice. In 2016 ETO lost the final against CSM in a penalty shootout, where Anikó Kovacsics was the only ETO-player able to score from the 7-metre line. They managed to beat Vardar in extra time on both occasions (31–30 in 2017 and 27–26 in 2018) with the second final becoming especially memorable with the last second save courtesy of Éva Kiss. The move was referred to by the press as the "Kiss of Death". Anita Görbicz, Nycke Groot and Nora Mørk (7, 6, and 6 goals) led the team in the 2017 final, while Groot and Eduarda Amorim were the top scorers for Győr with nine and six goals respectively during the 2018 final. In Hungary, their dominance remained, they won five Hungarian Championship titles and five Hungarian Cups, as well as two Hungarian Supercups. They lost two titles, both against Ferencváros.

In February 2018, the club announced that the most successful coach of the club's history, Ambros Martín, will not extend his contract and will leave the team after the 2017–18 season, since he wanted to seek out new challenges. Gábor Danyi - who was the assistant coach of the team since 2011 - took over his place on the bench.

=== 2019–2024, 70 Unbeaten matches, 200th Champions League win, new direction(s) ===
Danyi's first season as the head coach was one of ETO's best seasons so far. They did not just win all the titles possible, but remained unbeaten throughout the whole season. However, in May 2021 Danyi got sacked after a huge (nine goals) defeat against the domestic rivals Ferencváros, which also meant the team lost the National Championship title for the first time since 2015. The team lost two matches in total during Danyi's three-year tenure. Ambros Martín returned to the bench. In the Danyi era (2018–2021) ETO won one Hungarian Championship title, two Hungarian Cups and one Champions League final (against Russian Rostov, 25–24) as well as finishing third once in the most prestigious European competition (after losing to French Brest in the semi final). The COVID-19 pandemic also happened to appear around this time, all competitions were cancelled.

During this period multiple players who were considered to be the leaders of the team decided to either leave the team, and fight for different kind of goals (Nycke Groot in 2019), or retire from professional sport. On 4 June 2021 the legend and icon of Győri ETO KC, Anita Görbicz played her last match for the team and retired after spending 24 seasons playing for the club, scoring 3797 times. Another important and outstanding player of the era, Eduarda Amorim also played her last match for the team that day, leaving the club after 12 seasons with 1742 goals by her name. The club retired the jersey numbers of both players.

ETO holds the record for the longest unbeaten run in the EHF Champions League. Between 5 February 2018 and 6 February 2022 all their matches ended with either a victory or a draw. They set the record for 70 unbeaten matches in a row. In March 2022 it was announced that Csaba Bartha, the president of the club got his contract terminated on mutual consent. On 24 September 2022 ETO lost a Champions League group match to French side Metz in the Audi Aréna after almost seven years since the last loss on home court.

Beating HC Lokomotiva Zagreb 26:17 in round 11 (on 14 January 2023) of the competition marked Győr's record-setting 200th win in Champions League, becoming the first women's team to reach the respective milestone.

The second Martín era (2021–2023) came to an end after the season, and the management decided to turn into a different direction with assigning the Danish Ulrik Kirkely as the head coach of Győr. With Martín the club won both domestic national titles, but lost both domestic cups. In the CL they lost to Vipers Kristiansand both years, first in the 2022 final (31–33), then the 2023 semi final (35–37).

The tenure of the Danish coach wasn't long, on 13 March 2024 the club announced that they terminated the contract of Ulrik Kirkely and Kristian Danielsen with immediate effect, while Attila Kun (a coach from the club's academy) was named as the temporary head coach, until they found their new head coach, Swedish Per Johansson. With Kirkely the team lost to Mosonmagyaróvár and Ferencváros away in the national championship, and after 11 victories on 11 games in the Champions League they lost two out of their remaining matches and also drew once. On top of this ETO lost the Magyar Kupa final against Ferencváros. Although Győr lost both the domestic title and cup, they managed to triumph in the Champions League for the sixth time overall after trying unsuccessfully for the previous four years. Johansson's squad led by Estelle Nze Minko and Sandra Toft first beat Team Esbjerg in the semi final (24–23), then German SG BBM Bietigheim for the trophy (30–24). Stine Bredal Oftedal, often referred to as "the engine of the team" decided to end her professional career, that became a sweet goodbye with a Champions League title, her third one in the green and white jersey overall. She was also named the MVP of the Final Four weekend.

=== 2024–present, Current era ===
With seven new players joining the team for the 2024–25 season, there was some uncertainty about whether Győr would still be the top team in the world. But as the season went on, the new players proved up to the task of maintaining Győr's legacy. New arrivals Kristina Jørgensen and Dione Housheer linked up well with existing back players Bruna de Paula and Estelle Nze Minko, as well as with Kari Brattset Dale on the line. This new-look Győr side won the Hungarian Championship in 2025 after coming in second the previous year, with the crucial game being a strong 32–24 victory over arch-rivals and defending champions Ferencváros. In the Champions League, Győr finished first in the group stage and defeated HB Ludwigsburg to reach the Final Four once again. Just like in the previous season, they defeated Team Esbjerg by one goal in the semifinal, and then defeated Final Four debutants Odense Håndbold 29–27 in the final to win their seventh Champions League title. Brattset Dale was named MVP of the Final Four, and Housheer was the season's top goal scorer with 91 goals in the Champions League and 226 in total. Several Győr players were also given EHF Excellence Awards for the 2024-25 season: Nze Minko for left back, Housheer for right back, Viktória Győri-Lukács for right wing, and Brattset Dale for both line player and defender.

In the 2025-26 season, Győr had to revise their lineup right from the start as four players were unable to play due to pregnancies. Despite this, they went through the entire first half of the regular season undefeated, including pulling off a massive 32-17 victory over arch-rivals Ferencváros in the Hungarian League. At the beginning of 2026, Győr suffered a double blow as both of their pivots picked up injuries, leading to a slightly uneven second half of the regular season as they lost to domestic rivals Debrecen and Danish powerhouse Team Esbjerg in the Champions League. Nevertheless, Győr's form seemed to stabilize during the playoff period, as they won the double in Hungary and easily defeated Odense Håndbold in the Champions' League quarterfinals to reach the Final Four. After a narrow one-goal victory over Brest Bretagne Handball in the semifinal, Győr fell to French rivals Metz Handball 29-31 in the final, their fifth second-place finish in the Champions' League. Housheer was again Győr's top goal scorer of the season, with 106 goals in the Champions' League and 231 in total, while de Paula contributed 88 goals in the Champions' League. Three Győr players received EHF Excellence Awards for the 2025-26 season: Housheer again for right back, de Paula for left back, and Kelly Dulfer for defender.

== Crest, colours, supporters ==
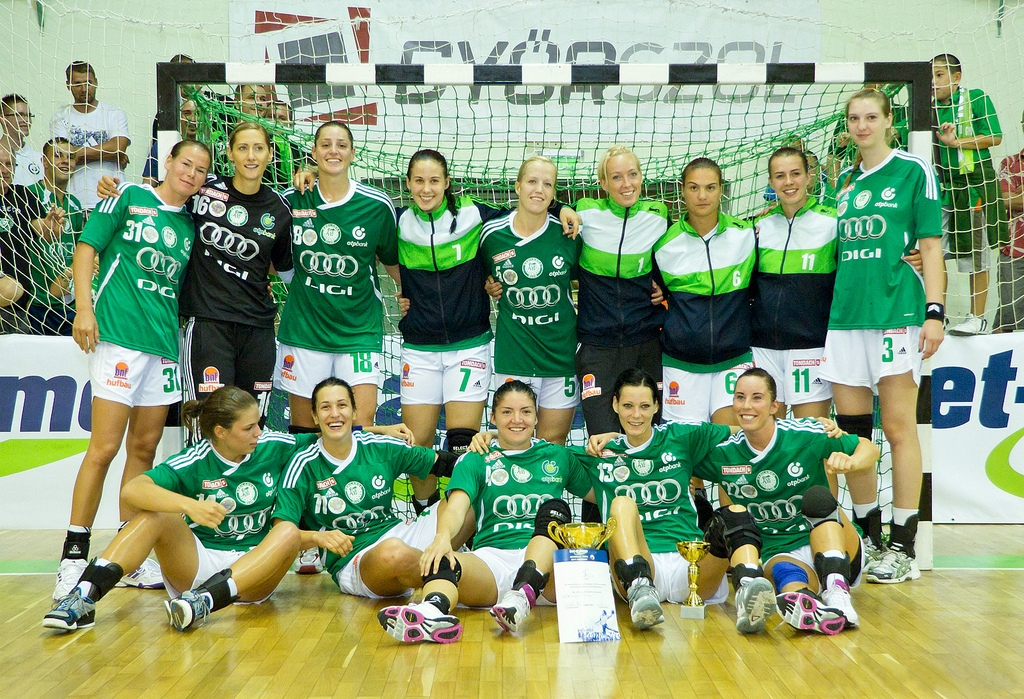
2011 Szabella European Super Cup-winning team

=== Kit manufacturers and shirt sponsor ===
The following table shows in detail Győri ETO KC kit manufacturers and shirt sponsors by year:

| Period | Kit manufacturer | Shirt sponsor |
|---|---|---|
| 2004–2006 | (Germany) adidas | graboplast / e·on |
| 2006–2010 | (Germany) adidas | Audi / e·on |
| 2010 | (Germany) Erima | Audi |
| 2011 | (Germany) Erima | Audi / Digi |
| 2011–2012 | (Germany) adidas | Audi / Digi |
| 2012–2013 | (Germany) adidas | Audi |
| 2013–2015 | (Germany) adidas | Audi / MVM |
| 2015 | (Germany) adidas | Audi / Győr |
| 2016–2022 | (Germany) adidas | Audi / Győri önkormányzat / Szerencsejáték Zrt. |
| 2023–2025 | (Japan) Mizuno | Audi / Győri önkormányzat / Szerencsejáték Zrt. |
| 2025– | (Denmark) Hummel | Audi / Győri önkormányzat / Szerencsejáték Zrt. |

=== Kits ===
HOME
| 2007–08 | 2008–10 | 2011–12 | 2021– |

AWAY
| 2004-05; 2011–12; 2017–18 | 2005-06 | 2007–08 | 2008–09 | 2013–14 |

THIRD
| 2005–06 | 2011–13 |

== Arena ==
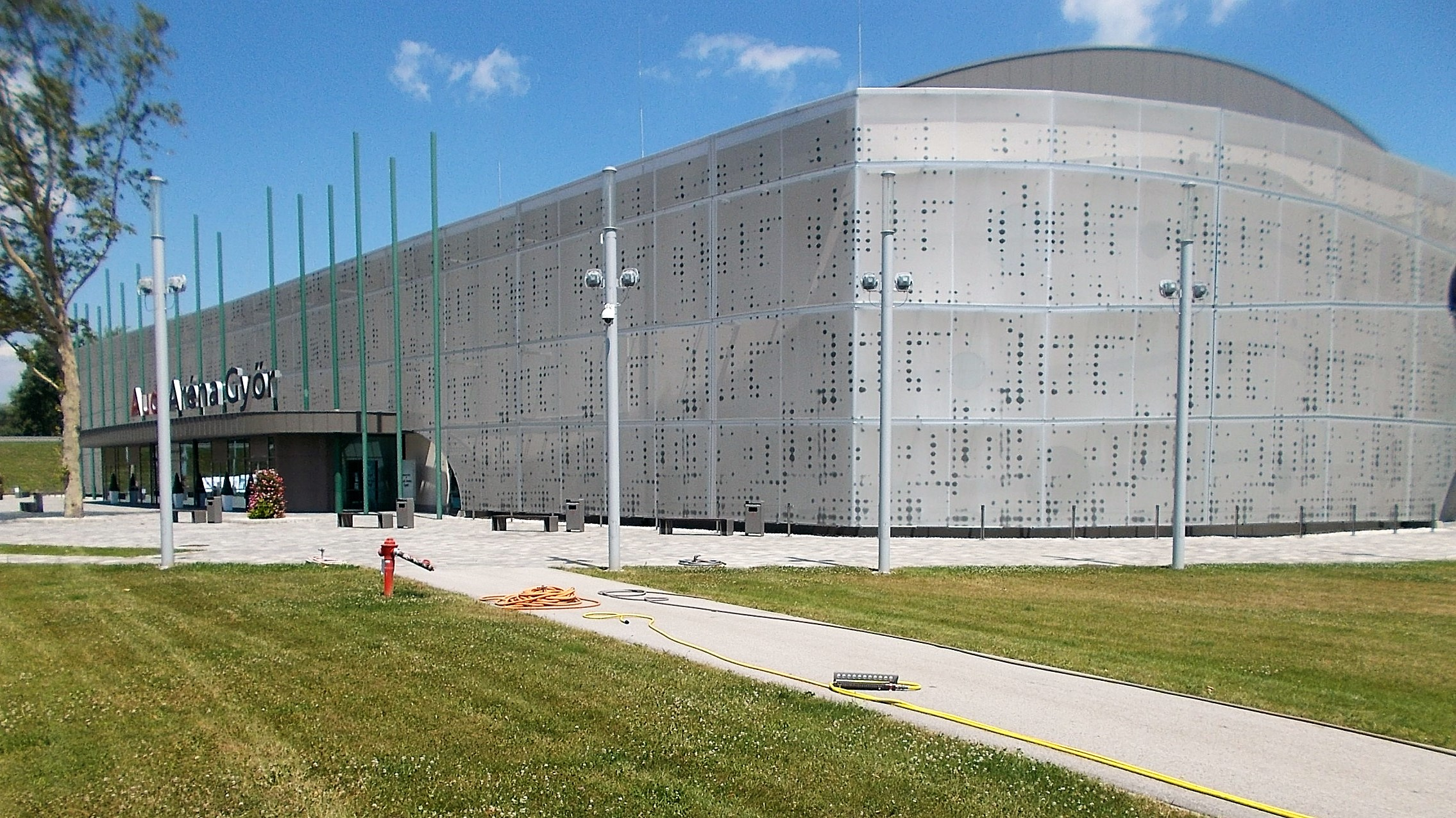
- Audi Aréna in Győr
  Name: Audi Aréna
- City: Győr, Hungary
- Capacity: 5,500 spectators
- Address: H-9027 Győr, Kiskút liget 4,

== Team ==
=== Current squad ===
Squad for the 2026–27 season

Goalkeepers

- 31 (Hungary) Zsófi Szemerey
- 89 (Denmark) Sandra Toft
- 99 (France) Hatadou Sako

Left wingers

- 23 (Hungary) Csenge Fodor
- 28 (Netherlands) Bo van Wetering
- 86 (Hungary) Janka Zákányi

Right wingers

- 22 (Hungary) Viktória Győri-Lukács
- 26 (Norway) Emilie Hovden
- 62 (Hungary) Dalma Varga

Pivots

- 5 (Sweden) Linn Blohm (pregnant)
- 7 (Norway) Kari Brattset Dale (c)
- 77 (France) Sarah Bouktit

Left backs

- 10 (Brazil) Bruna de Paula
- 14 (Norway) Kristine Breistøl
- 17 (Netherlands) Kelly Dulfer
- 21 (Norway) Veronica Kristiansen

Centre backs

- 15 (Slovenia) Tjaša Stanko
- 27 (France) Estelle Nze Minko
- 68 (Denmark) Helena Elver

Right backs

- 33 (Norway) Thale Rushfeldt Deila
- 48 (Netherlands) Dione Housheer
- 75 (Hungary) Kriston Kíra

Squad information
| No. | Nat. | Player | Position | Date of birth | In | Contract until | Previous club |
|---|---|---|---|---|---|---|---|
| 5 | (Sweden) | Linn Blohm | Line Player | 20 May 1992 | 2021 | 2027 | (Romania) Minaur Baia Mare |
| 7 | (Norway) | Kari Brattset Dale | Line Player | 15 February 1991 | 2018 | 2027 | (Norway) Vipers Kristiansand |
| 10 | (Brazil) | Bruna de Paula | Left Back | 26 September 1996 | 2023 | 2027 | (France) Metz Handball |
| 14 | (Norway) | Kristine Breistøl | Left Back | 23 August 1993 | 2024 | 2028 | (Denmark) Team Esbjerg |
| 15 | (Slovenia) | Tjaša Stanko | Left Back | 5 November 1997 | 2025 | 2027 | (Slovenia) RK Krim |
| 17 | (Netherlands) | Kelly Dulfer | Left Back | 21 March 1994 | 2024 | 2028 | (Germany) HB Ludwigsburg |
| 21 | (Norway) | Veronica Kristiansen | Left Back | 10 July 1990 | 2018 | 2027 | (Denmark) FC Midtjylland |
| 22 | (Hungary) | Viktória Győri-Lukács | Right Wing | 31 October 1995 | 2020 | 2028 | (Hungary) Ferencvárosi TC |
| 23 | (Hungary) | Csenge Fodor | Left Wing | 23 April 1999 | 2017 | 2027 | (Hungary) NEKA |
| 26 | (Norway) | Emilie Hovden | Right Wing | 5 April 1996 | 2023 | 2028 | (Denmark) Viborg HK |
| 27 | (France) | Estelle Nze Minko | Centre Back | 11 August 1991 | 2019 | 2027 | (Hungary) Siófok KC |
| 28 | (Netherlands) | Bo van Wetering | Left Wing | 5 October 1999 | 2024 | 2028 | (Denmark) Odense Håndbold |
| 31 | (Hungary) | Zsófi Szemerey | Goalkeeper | 2 June 1994 | 2025 | 2027 | (France) Metz Handball |
| 33 | (Norway) | Thale Rushfeldt Deila | Left Back | 15 January 2000 | 2026 | 2028 | (Denmark) Odense Håndbold |
| 48 | (Netherlands) | Dione Housheer | Right Back | 26 September 1999 | 2024 | 2030 | (Denmark) Odense Håndbold |
| 68 | (Denmark) | Helena Elver | Centre Back | 1 March 1998 | 2025 | 2027 | (Denmark) Odense Håndbold |
| 77 | (France) | Sarah Bouktit | Line Player | 27 August 2002 | 2026 | 2028 | (France) Metz Handball |
| 89 | (Denmark) | Sandra Toft | Goalkeeper | 18 October 1989 | 2022 | 2027 | (France) Brest Bretagne |
| 99 | (France) | Hatadou Sako | Goalkeeper | 21 October 1995 | 2024 | 2029 | (France) Metz Handball |

=== Transfers ===
Transfers for the 2027–28 season

Joining

Leaving

- (Norway) Veronica Kristiansen (LB) (retires)
- (Denmark) Helena Elver (CB) (to (Denmark) Odense Håndbold)
- (Hungary) Rédecsi Polett (CB) (on loan to (Slovakia) HC DAC) (immediate effect)
- (Netherlands) Kelly Dulfer (LB) (to (France) Brest Bretagne Handball)?
- (Netherlands) Dione Housheer (RB) (to (France) Brest Bretagne Handball)?

=== Staff members ===
- (Hungary) Chairman: Anita Görbicz
- (Hungary) Technical Director: Tímea Konkoly
- (Sweden) Head Coach: Per Johansson
- (Slovenia) Assistant Coach: Uroš Bregar
- (Hungary) Goalkeeping Coach: Éva Kiss
- (Hungary) Fitness Coach: Zoltán Holanek
- (Hungary) Club Doctor: Péter Balogh, MD
- (Hungary) Club Doctor: László Szálasy, MD

== Notable players ==
=== Retired numbers ===
Győri ETO KC
| No. | Player | Position | Tenure | Matches | Goals | Seasons | IHF World Player of the Year |
| 13 | (Hungary) Anita Görbicz | Centre Back / Left Wing | 1997–2021 | 750 | 3797 | 24 | 2005 |
| 18 | (Brazil) Eduarda Amorim | Left Back | 2009–2021 | 457 | 1742 | 12 | 2014 |

- (Hungary) Anita Görbicz (1997–2024) (CB) IHF 2005
- (Hungary) Beáta Hoffmann ( –1985, 1992–2001) (GK)
- (Hungary) Katalin Pálinger ( –2000, 2007–2012) (GK)
- (Hungary) Éva Kiss (2015–2020) (GK)
- (Hungary) Zsófi Szemerey (2011–2013, 2025– ) (GK)
- (Hungary) Orsolya Herr (2000–2009, 2012–2015) (GK)
- (Hungary) Irina Sirina (2000–2005) (GK)
- (Hungary) Andrea Farkas (2006) (GK)
- (Hungary) Viktória Petróczi (1998–2007) (GK)
- (Hungary) Viktória Oguntoye (2007–2010) (GK)
- (Hungary) Vivien Víg (2009–2010) (GK)
- (Hungary) Bernadett Bódi (2001–2007, 2013–2020) (RW)
- (Hungary) Viktória Győri-Lukács (2020– ) (RW)
- (Hungary) Adrienn Orbán (2004–2005, 2009–2017) (RW)
- (Hungary) Mónika Kovacsicz (2003–2007) (RW)
- (Hungary) Zsuzsanna Lovász (2000–2003) (RW)
- (Hungary) Dorottya Faluvégi (2019–2023) (RW)
- (Hungary) Anikó Nagy (1992–2001) (RB)
- (Hungary) Ágnes Hornyák (2006–2015) (RB)
- (Hungary) Ibolya Mehlmann (1999–2005) (RB)
- (Hungary) Bojana Radulović (2006–2007) (RB)
- (Hungary) Viktória Soós (2012–2014) (RB)
- (Hungary) Anita Herr (2005–2006, 2008–2009) (RB)
- (Hungary) Anita Kulcsár (1995–2001) (LP)
- (Hungary) Rita Borbás (2003–2005) (LP)
- (Hungary) Szabina Mayer (2005–2006, 2008–2011) (LP)
- (Hungary) Piroska Szamoránsky ( –2005) (LP)
- (Hungary) Bernadett Horváth (2007–2009) (LP)
- (Hungary) Anett Kisfaludy (2007–2010) (LP)
- (Hungary) Krisztina Pigniczki (1993–2001) (CB)
- (Hungary) Anikó Kovacsics (2006–2016) (CB)
- (Hungary) Bernadett Temes (2002–2008) (CB)
- (Hungary) Barbara Bognár (2003–2007) (CB)
- (Hungary) Zsuzsanna Tomori (2007–2010, 2015–2019) (LB)
- (Hungary) Magda Jóna (1959–1960) (LB)
- (Hungary) Renáta Mörtel (1999–2006) (LB)
- (Hungary) Dóra Deáki (2007–2010) (LB)
- (Hungary) Marianna Bordásné Horváth (1992–2001) (LW)
- (Hungary) Krisztina Nagy (1992–1998, 2005–2006) (RB)
- (Hungary) Beatrix Prok (1999–2002) (LB)
- (Hungary) Gyöngyi Drávai (2006–2008) (LB)
- (Hungary) Dóra Hornyák (2012–2014) (LB)
- (Hungary) Noémi Háfra (2021–2022) (LB)
- (Hungary) Gabriella Kindl (1999–2003) (LB)
- (Hungary) Eszter Mátéfi (1993–1997) (LB)
- (Hungary) Anna Szántó (1993–1996) (LW)
- (Hungary) Orsolya Vérten (2002–2012) (LW)
- (Hungary) Gabriella Juhász (2003–2007) (LW)
- (Hungary) Nadine Szöllősi-Schatzl (2010–2012, 2021–2024) (LW)
- (Hungary) Csenge Fodor (2017– ) (LW)
- (Hungary) Dorina Korsós (2012–2017) (LW)
- (Hungary) Ivett Szepesi (2012–2015) (LW)
- (Hungary) Patrícia Szölösi Sørensen (2007–2011) (LW)
- (Norway) Katrine Lunde (2010–2015) (GK)
- (Norway) Kari Aalvik Grimsbø (2015–2020) (GK)
- (Norway) Silje Solberg-Østhassel (2020–2024) (GK)
- (Norway) Stine Oftedal Dahmke (2017–2024) (CB) IHF 2019
- (Norway) Heidi Løke (2011–2017) (LP) IHF 2011
- (Norway) Kari Brattset Dale (2018– ) (LP)
- (Norway) Veronica Kristiansen (2018–2027) (LB)
- (Norway) Kristine Breistøl (2024– ) (LB)
- (Norway) Thale Rushfeldt Deila (2026– ) (LB)
- (Norway) Nora Mørk (2016–2019) (RB)
- (Norway) Linn Jørum Sulland (2015–2016) (RB)
- (Norway) Amanda Kurtović (2019–2020) (RB)
- (Norway) Emilie Hovden (2023– ) (RW)
- (Norway) Ida Alstad (2016) (LB)
- (France) Amandine Leynaud (2018–2022, 2023) (GK)
- (France) Hatadou Sako (2024– ) (GK)
- (France) Laura Glauser (2020–2022) (GK)
- (France) Estelle Nze Minko (2019– ) (LB)
- (France) Sarah Bouktit (2026– ) (LP)
- (France) Béatrice Edwige (2019–2021) (LP)
- (France) Raphaëlle Tervel (2012–2014, 2022) (LP)
- (Romania) Aurelia Brădeanu (2004–2011) (LB)
- (Romania) Simona Gogîrlă (2004–2007) (LB)
- (Romania) Crina Pintea (2018–2019, 2021–2022) (LP)
- (Romania) Ana Maria Șomoi (2005–2007) (LP)
- (Romania) Carmen Nițescu (2001–2004) (LB)
- (Romania) Nadina Dumitru (1997–1999) (RW)
- (Netherlands) Nycke Groot (2015–2019) (CB)
- (Netherlands) Yvette Broch (2015–2018, 2022–2024) (LP)
- (Netherlands) Rinka Duijndam (2023–2024) (GK)
- (Netherlands) Dione Housheer (2024–) (RB)
- (Netherlands) Kelly Dulfer (2024–) (LB)
- (Netherlands) Bo van Wetering (2024–) (LW)
- (Denmark) Sandra Toft (2022– ) (GK)
- (Denmark) Anne Mette Hansen (2017–2023) (LB)
- (Denmark) Line Haugsted (2022–2024) (LB)
- (Denmark) Kristina Jørgensen (2024–2026) (CB)
- (Denmark) Helena Elver (2025–2027) (CB)
- (Denmark) Ida-Marie Dahl (2026) (LP)
- (Montenegro) Jovanka Radičević (2011–2013) (RW)
- (Montenegro) Katarina Bulatović (2013–2014, 2019–2020) (RB)
- (Montenegro) Ana Đokić (2002–2008) (LP)
- (Montenegro) Jelena Despotović (2021–2023) (LB)
- (Brazil) Eduarda Amorim (2009–2021) (LB) IHF 2014
- (Brazil) Bruna de Paula (2023– ) (LB)
- (Brazil) Tamires Morena (2015) (LP)
- (Sweden) Linn Blohm (2021– ) (LP)
- (Sweden) Anna Lagerquist (2024–2026) (LP)
- (Sweden) Nathalie Hagman (2025–2026) (RW)
- (Austria) Simona Spiridon (2007–2011) (LP)
- (Austria) Gabriela Rotiș (2008–2009) (LB)
- (Slovenia) Ana Gros (2010–2012, 2022–2024) (RB)
- (Slovenia) Tjaša Stanko (2025– ) (LB)
- (Germany) Anja Althaus (2017–2018) (LP)
- (Germany) Susann Müller (2014–2015) (RB)
- (Spain) Macarena Aguilar (2014–2015) (CB)
- (Spain) Mireya González (2018) (RB)
- (Croatia) Jelena Grubišić (2014–2015) (GK)
- (Croatia) Vesna Milanović-Litre (2014–2015) (LP)
- (Slovakia) Katarína Mravíková (2007–2011) (RW)
- (Slovakia) Ljubica Hlavatá (1993–1995) (RW)
- (Serbia) Andrea Lekić (2011–2013) (CB) IHF 2013
- (Czech Republic) Jana Knedlíková (2015–2020) (RW)
- (South Korea) Ryu Eun-hee (2021–2025) (RB)
- (Russia) Anna Sen (2014–2015) (LB)
- (Tunisia) Asma Elghaoui (2016–2017) (LP)
- (Ukraine) Svetlana Moskovaya (1998–2002) (LP)

== Head coach history ==
| (Hungary) | László Stéger | 1957–1963 |
| (Hungary) | Jenő Kheim | 1964–1968 |
| (Hungary) | Zoltán Tompa | 1973 |
| (Hungary) | Lajos Horváth | 1989–1992; 1993–1994; |
| (Hungary) | Tibor Kocsis | 1992–1993 |
| (Hungary) | Kálmán Róth | 1994–1996; 2002–2007 |
| (Hungary) | István Hikádé | 1996 |
| (Hungary) | József Vura | 1996–2002 |
| (Hungary) | Csaba Konkoly | 2007–2011 |
| (Norway) | Karl Erik Bøhn | 2011–2012 |
| (Spain) | Ambros Martín | 2012–2018; 2021–2023 |
| (Hungary) | Gábor Danyi | 2018–2021 |
| (Denmark) | Ulrik Kirkely | 2023–2024 |
| (Sweden) | Per Johansson | 2024– |

== Chairman history ==
| (Hungary) | Attila Vanyus | 1989–2011 |
| (Hungary) (Slovakia) | Ernő Kelecsényi | 2011–2016 |
| (Hungary) | Csaba Bartha | 2016–2022 |
| (Hungary) | Anita Görbicz | 2022–present |

== Honours ==
=== Domestic competitions ===
Nemzeti Bajnokság I (National Championship of Hungary)

- Champions (19) – record: 1957, 1959, 2004–05, 2005–06, 2007–08, 2008–09, 2009–10, 2010–11, 2011–12, 2012–13, 2013–14, 2015–16, 2016–17, 2017–18, 2018–19, 2021–22, 2022–23, 2024–25, 2025–26
- Runners-up: 1960, 1997–98, 1999–00, 2003–04, 2006–07, 2014–15, 2020–21, 2023–24
- Third place: 1998–99, 2000–01, 2001–02, 2002–03

Magyar Kupa (National Cup of Hungary)

- Winners (16): 2004–05, 2005–06, 2006–07, 2007–08, 2008–09, 2009–10, 2010–11, 2011–12, 2012–13, 2013–14, 2014–15, 2015–16, 2017–18, 2018–19, 2020–21, 2025–26
- Finalists: 1999–00, 2001–02, 2003–04, 2016–17, 2021–22, 2022–23, 2023–24, 2024–25

Szuperkupa (Super Cup of Hungary); Championship vs. Cup winner

- Winners: 2014 (Ch.), 2015 (C.) 2026

=== European competitions ===
- EHF Champions League:
  - Winners (7): 2013, 2014, 2017, 2018, 2019, 2024, 2025
  - Finalists: 2009, 2012, 2016, 2022, 2026
  - Third place/Semifinalists: 2007, 2008, 2010, 2021, 2023
- EHF Cup Winners' Cup:
  - Finalists: 2006
- EHF Cup:
  - Finalists: 1999, 2002, 2004, 2005

=== Others ===
- Hungarian Sport Team Of The Year: 2014, 2017, 2018

== Recent seasons ==
As of 2 June 2024

- Seasons in Nemzeti Bajnokság I: 43
- Seasons in Nemzeti Bajnokság I/B: 9
- Seasons in Nemzeti Bajnokság II: 2

| Season | Division | Pos. | Magyar kupa |
|---|---|---|---|
| 1993–94 | NB I | 5th | |
| 1994–95 | NB I | 5th | |
| 1995–96 | NB I | 4th | |
| 1996–97 | NB I | 5th | |
| 1997–98 | NB I | Runner-up | |
| 1998–99 | NB I | Third place | |
| 1999–00 | NB I | Runner-up | Finalist |
| 2000–01 | NB I | Third place | |
| 2001–02 | NB I | Third place | Finalist |
| 2002–03 | NB I | Third place | |

| Season | Division | Pos. | Magyar kupa |
|---|---|---|---|
| 2003–04 | NB I | Runner-up | Finalist |
| 2004–05 | NB I | Champion | Winner |
| 2005–06 | NB I | Champion | Winner |
| 2006–07 | NB I | Runner-up | Winner |
| 2007–08 | NB I | Champion | Winner |
| 2008–09 | NB I | Champion | Winner |
| 2009–10 | NB I | Champion | Winner |
| 2010–11 | NB I | Champion | Winner |
| 2011–12 | NB I | Champion | Winner |
| 2012–13 | NB I | Champion | Winner |

| Season | Division | Pos. | Magyar kupa |
|---|---|---|---|
| 2013–14 | NB I | Champion | Winner |
| 2014–15 | NB I | Runner-up | Winner |
| 2015–16 | NB I | Champion | Winner |
| 2016–17 | NB I | Champion | Finalist |
| 2017–18 | NB I | Champion | Winner |
| 2018–19 | NB I | Champion | Winner |
| 2019–20 | NB I | Cancelled | |
| 2020–21 | NB I | Runner-up | Winner |
| 2021–22 | NB I | Champion | Finalist |
| 2022–23 | NB I | Champion | Finalist |

| Season | Division | Pos. | Magyar kupa |
|---|---|---|---|
| 2023–24 | NB I | Runner-up | Finalist |
| 2024–25 | NB I | Champion | Finalist |
| 2025–26 | NB I | Champion | Winner |

=== In European competition ===
Source: kézitörténelem.hu

- Participations in Champions League: 22×
- Participations in EHF European League (EHF Cup): 4×
- Participations in Challenge Cup (City Cup): 2×
- Participations in Cup Winners' Cup: 3×

Record
| Season | Competition | Round | Club | Home | Away | Aggregate |
|---|---|---|---|---|---|---|
| 2026–27 | EHF Champions League | Group stage Group B | (France) Metz Handball | 34–34 | | |
| 2026–27 | EHF Champions League | Group stage Group B | (Denmark) Odense Håndbold | | 32–31 | |
| 2026–27 | EHF Champions League | Group stage Group B | (Romania) CS Gloria Bistrița | 36–32 | | |
| 2026–27 | EHF Champions League | Group stage Group B | (Croatia) HC Podravka Vegeta | | 26–23 | |
| 2026–27 | EHF Champions League | Group stage Group B | (Norway) Storhamar HE | | 30–20 | |
| 2026–27 | EHF Champions League | Group stage Group B | (Germany) HSG Blomberg-Lippe | 41–24 | 36–21 | |
| 2026–27 | EHF Champions League | Group stage Group B | (Denmark) Nykøbing Falster | 35–25 | | |

Statistics: matches played – 367, wins – 269, draws – 23, losses – 75, goals scored – 10,735, goals conceded – 9,010, goal difference – +1,725

== Statistics ==
=== Individual awards in the EHF Champions League ===
| Season | Player | Award |
|---|---|---|
| 2011–12 | (Hungary) Anita Görbicz | Top Scorer (133 goals) |
| 2013–14 | (Norway) Katrine Lunde | Most Valuable Player |
| 2013–14 | (Hungary) Anita Görbicz | Top Scorer (87 goals) |
| 2013–14 | (Brazil) Eduarda Amorim | All–Star Team (Best Left Back) |
| 2013–14 | (Hungary) Anita Görbicz | All–Star Team (Best Centre Back) |
| 2013–14 | (Montenegro) Katarina Bulatović | All–Star Team (Best Right Back) |
| 2014–15 | (Hungary) Anikó Kovacsics | All–Star Team (Best Centre Back) |
| 2014–15 | (Norway) Heidi Løke | All–Star Team (Best Line Player) |
| 2014–15 | (Spain) Ambros Martín | Best coach |
| 2014–15 | (Hungary) Dorina Korsós | Best Defender Player |
| 2015–16 | (Norway) Kari Aalvik Grimsbø | All-Star Team (Best Goalkeeper) |
| 2015–16 | (Netherlands) Nycke Groot | All–Star Team (Best Centre Back) |
| 2015–16 | (Hungary) Anikó Kovacsics | All–Star Team (Best Left Wing) |
| 2015–16 | (Norway) Heidi Løke | All–Star Team (Best Line Player) |
| 2015–16 | (Brazil) Eduarda Amorim | Best Defender Player |
| 2015–16 | (Spain) Ambros Martín | Best Coach |
| 2016–17 | (Netherlands) Nycke Groot | Most Valuable Player |
| 2016–17 | (Norway) Kari Aalvik Grimsbø | All-Star Team (Best Goalkeeper) |
| 2016–17 | (Netherlands) Nycke Groot | All–Star Team (Best Centre Back) |
| 2016–17 | (Norway) Nora Mørk | All–Star Team (Best Right Back) |
| 2016–17 | (Brazil) Eduarda Amorim | Best Defender Player |
| 2016–17 | (Spain) Ambros Martín | Best Coach |
| 2017–18 | (Norway) Kari Aalvik Grimsbø | All–Star Team (Best Goalkeeper) |
| 2017–18 | (Hungary) Zsuzsanna Tomori | Best Defender Player |
| 2017–18 | (Spain) Ambros Martín | Best coach |
| 2018–19 | (Norway) Kari Aalvik Grimsbø | Most Valuable Player |
| 2018–19 | (Denmark) Anne Mette Hansen | All-Star Team (Best Left Back) |
| 2018–19 | (Norway) Stine Bredal Oftedal | All-Star Team (Best Centre Back) |
| 2018–19 | (Romania) Crina Pintea | All-Star Team (Best Line Player) |
| 2018–19 | (Brazil) Eduarda Amorim | Best Defender Player |
| 2019–20 | (France) Amandine Leynaud | All-Star Team (Best Goalkeeper) |
| 2019–20 | (Norway) Stine Bredal Oftedal | All-Star Team (Best Centre Back) |
| 2019–20 | (Brazil) Eduarda Amorim | Best Defender Player |
| 2020–21 | (France) Amandine Leynaud | All-Star Team (Best Goalkeeper) |
| 2020–21 | (Norway) Stine Bredal Oftedal | All-Star Team (Best Centre Back) |
| 2020–21 | (Hungary) Viktória Lukács | All-Star Team (Best Right Wing) |
| 2020–21 | (Brazil) Eduarda Amorim | Best Defender Player |
| 2021–22 | (France) Laura Glauser | All-Star Team (Best Goalkeeper) |
| 2021–22 | (Norway) Stine Bredal Oftedal | All-Star Team (Best Centre Back) |
| 2021–22 | (Sweden) Linn Blohm | All-Star Team (Best Line Player) |
| 2021–22 | (Norway) Kari Brattset Dale | Best Defender Player |
| 2021–22 | (Spain) Ambros Martín | Best coach |
| 2023–24 | (Norway) Stine Bredal Oftedal | Most Valuable Player |
| 2024–25 | (Norway) Kari Brattset Dale | Most Valuable Player |

=== EHF Excellence Awards ===
| Season | Player | Award |
|---|---|---|
| 2022/23 | (Slovenia) Ana Gros | Right Back of the Season |
| 2023/24 | (Denmark) Sandra Toft | Goalkeeper of the Season |
| 2023/24 | (Norway) Stine Bredal Oftedal | Centre Back of the Season |
| 2023/24 | (Hungary) Viktória Győri-Lukács | Right Wing of the Season |
| 2023/24 | (Denmark) Line Haugsted | Defender of the Season |
| 2024/25 | (France) Estelle Nze Minko | Left Back of the Season |
| 2024/25 | (Netherlands) Dione Housheer | Right Back of the Season |
| 2024/25 | (Hungary) Viktória Győri-Lukács | Right Wing of the Season |
| 2024/25 | (Norway) Kari Brattset Dale | Line Player of the Season |
| 2024/25 | (Norway) Kari Brattset Dale | Defender of the Season |
| 2025/26 | (Brazil) Bruna de Paula | Left Back of the Season |
| 2025/26 | (Netherlands) Dione Housheer | Right Back of the Season |
| 2025/26 | (Netherlands) Kelly Dulfer | Defender of the Season |

=== Top scorers in the EHF Champions League ===
(All-Time) – Last updated on 14 November 2026
Every player that has scored at least 100 goals is included.

| Rank | Name | Seasons played | Goals |
|---|---|---|---|
| 1 | (Hungary) Anita Görbicz | 18 | 1,016 |
| 2 | (Brazil) Eduarda Amorim | 12 | 663 |
| 3 | (Norway) Stine Bredal Oftedal | 7 | 442 |
| 4 | (France) Estelle Nze Minko | 7 | 401 |
| 5 | (Norway) Heidi Løke | 6 | 343 |
| 6 | (Norway) Veronica Kristiansen | 8 | 316 |
| 7 | (Norway) Kari Brattset Dale | 8 | 300 |
| 8 | (Hungary) Anikó Kovacsics | 9 | 287 |
| 9 | (Hungary) Orsolya Vérten | 8 | 282 |
| 10 | (Romania) Aurelia Brădeanu | 7 | 247 |
| 11 | (Netherlands) Nycke Groot | 4 | 234 |
| 12 | (Denmark) Anne Mette Hansen | 6 | 233 |
| 13 | (Hungary) Viktória Győri-Lukács | 7 | 230 |
| 14 | (Netherlands) Dione Housheer | 3 | 227 |
| 15 | (Hungary) Csenge Fodor | 9 | 220 |
| 16 | (Brazil) Bruna de Paula | 4 | 218 |
| 17 | (Hungary) Bernadett Bódi | 10 | 217 |
| 18 | (Hungary) Zsuzsanna Tomori | 7 | 201 |
| 19 | (Slovenia) Ana Gros | 4 | 198 |
| 20 | (Slovakia) Katarína Mravíková | 4 | 189 |
| 21 | (Sweden) Linn Blohm | 5 | 165 |
| 22 | (Austria) Simona Spiridon | 5 | 163 |
| 23 | (South Korea) Ryu Eun-hee | 4 | 156 |
| 24 | (Hungary) Ágnes Hornyák | 8 | 148 |
| 25 | (Netherlands) Yvette Broch | 5 | 146 |
| 26 | (Norway) Nora Mørk | 3 | 137 |
| 27 | (Norway) Emilie Hovden | 4 | 132 |
| 28 | (Hungary) Nadine Szöllősi-Schatzl | 3 | 131 |
| 29 | (Czech Republic) Jana Knedlíková | 6 | 122 |
| 30 | (Montenegro) Jovanka Radičević | 2 | 119 |
| 31 | (Serbia) Andrea Lekić | 2 | 112 |
| 32 | (Denmark) Kristina Jørgensen | 2 | 103 |
| 33 | (Montenegro) Katarina Bulatović | 2 | 101 |

=== Top scorers by season ===
| Season | Player | Goals |
|---|---|---|
| 2005–2006 | (Hungary) Anita Görbicz | 270 |
| 2006–2007 | (Hungary) Anita Görbicz (2) | 235 |
| 2007–2008 | (Hungary) Anita Görbicz (3) | 260 |
| 2008–2009 | (Hungary) Anita Görbicz (4) | 199 |
| 2009–2010 | (Brazil) Eduarda Amorim | 193 |
| 2010–2011 | (Hungary) Anita Görbicz (5) | 230 |
| 2011–2012 | (Hungary) Anita Görbicz (6) | 308 |
| 2012–2013 | (Norway) Heidi Løke | 206 |
| 2013–2014 | (Hungary) Anita Görbicz (7) | 184 |
| 2014–2015 | (Hungary) Anikó Kovacsics | 220 |
| 2015–2016 | (Norway) Heidi Løke (2) | 203 |
| 2016–2017 | (Norway) Nora Mørk | 233 |

| Season | Player | Goals |
|---|---|---|
| 2017–2018 | (Hungary) Anita Görbicz (8) | 160 |
| 2018–2019 | (Netherlands) Nycke Groot | 205 |
| 2019–2020 | (Norway) Stine Bredal Oftedal | 173 |
| 2020–2021 | (France) Estelle Nze Minko | 220 |
| 2021–2022 | (Denmark) Anne Mette Hansen | 154 |
| 2022–2023 | (Slovenia) Ana Gros | 208 |
| 2023–2024 | (France) Estelle Nze Minko (2) | 176 |
| 2024–2025 | (Netherlands) Dione Housheer | 226 |
| 2025–2026 | (Netherlands) Dione Housheer (2) | 231 |

=== Most league appearances ===
Last updated on 25 May 2025

| Rank | Name | Apps |
|---|---|---|
| 1 | (Hungary) Anita Görbicz | 442 |
| 2 | (Hungary) Bernadett Bódi | 272 |
| 3 | (Brazil) Eduarda Amorim | 255 |
| 4 | (Hungary) Orsolya Vérten | 252 |
| 5 | (Hungary) Beáta Hoffmann | 211 |
| 6 | (Hungary) Anikó Kovacsics | 209 |
| 7 | (Hungary) Katalin Pálinger | 208 |
| 8 | (Hungary) Orsolya Herr | 194 |
| 9 | (Hungary) Ágnes Hornyák | 187 |
| 10 | (Hungary) Anikó Nagy | 184 |

Highlighted players are still playing for the club.

=== Top league goalscorers ===
Last updated on 25 May 2025

| Rank | Name | Goals |
|---|---|---|
| 1 | (Hungary) Anita Görbicz | 2181 |
| 2 | (Brazil) Eduarda Amorim | 960 |
| 3 | (Hungary) Orsolya Vérten | 958 |
| 4 | (Hungary) Anikó Nagy | 770 |
| 5 | (Hungary) Anita Kulcsár | 759 |
| 6 | (Hungary) Anikó Kovacsics | 728 |
| 7 | (Romania) Aurelia Brădeanu | 656 |
| 8 | (Norway) Heidi Løke | 648 |
| 9 | (Norway) Stine Bredal Oftedal | 632 |
| 10 | (Hungary) Eszter Mátéfi | 607 |

=== Champions League winners ===
List of Champions League winners
| Titles | Players | Winning years |
|---|---|---|
| 5 | (Hungary) Anita Görbicz | 2013, 2014, 2017, 2018, 2019 |
| 5 | (Brazil) Eduarda Amorim | 2013, 2014, 2017, 2018, 2019 |
| 4 | (Hungary) Bernadett Bódi | 2014, 2017, 2018, 2019 |
| 4 | (Hungary) Csenge Fodor | 2018, 2019, 2024, 2025 |
| 3 | (Hungary) Éva Kiss | 2017, 2018, 2019 |
| 3 | (Hungary) Dorina Korsós | 2013, 2014, 2017 |
| 3 | (Hungary) Adrienn Orbán | 2013, 2014, 2017 |
| 3 | (Hungary) Tamara Pál | 2017, 2018, 2019 |
| 3 | (Hungary) Szidónia Puhalák | 2017, 2018, 2019 |
| 3 | (Hungary) Zsuzsanna Tomori | 2017, 2018, 2019 |
| 3 | (Norway) Kari Aalvik Grimsbø | 2017, 2018, 2019 |
| 3 | (Norway) Nora Mørk | 2017, 2018, 2019 |
| 3 | (Norway) Heidi Løke | 2013, 2014, 2017 |
| 3 | (Norway) Stine Bredal Oftedal | 2018, 2019, 2024 |
| 3 | (Norway) Kari Brattset Dale | 2019, 2024, 2025 |
| 3 | (Norway) Veronica Kristiansen | 2019, 2024, 2025 |
| 3 | (Netherlands) Nycke Groot | 2017, 2018, 2019 |
| 3 | (Netherlands) Yvette Broch | 2017, 2018, 2024 |
| 3 | (Czech Republic) Jana Knedlíková | 2017, 2018, 2019 |
| 2 | (Hungary) Viktória Győri-Lukács | 2024, 2025 |
| 2 | (Hungary) Orsolya Herr | 2013, 2014 |
| 2 | (Hungary) Ágnes Hornyák | 2013, 2014 |
| 2 | (Hungary) Dóra Hornyák | 2013, 2014 |
| 2 | (Hungary) Anikó Kovacsics | 2013, 2014 |
| 2 | (Hungary) Szederke Sirián | 2013, 2014 |
| 2 | (Hungary) Viktória Soós | 2013, 2014 |
| 2 | (Hungary) Ivett Szepesi | 2013, 2014 |
| 2 | (Denmark) Anne Mette Hansen | 2018, 2019 |
| 2 | (Denmark) Sandra Toft | 2024, 2025 |
| 2 | (France) Raphaëlle Tervel | 2013, 2014 |
| 2 | (France) Estelle Nze Minko | 2024, 2025 |
| 2 | (Norway) Katrine Lunde | 2013, 2014 |
| 2 | (Norway) Emilie Hovden | 2024, 2025 |
| 2 | (Brazil) Bruna de Paula | 2024, 2025 |
| 2 | (South Korea) Ryu Eun-hee | 2024, 2025 |
| 2 | (Sweden) Linn Blohm | 2024, 2025 |
| 1 | (Netherlands) Rinka Duijndam | 2024 |
| 1 | (Netherlands) Kelly Dulfer | 2025 |
| 1 | (Netherlands) Dione Housheer | 2025 |
| 1 | (Netherlands) Bo van Wetering | 2025 |
| 1 | (Hungary) Júlia Hársfalvi | 2017 |
| 1 | (Hungary) Nadine Szöllősi-Schatzl | 2024 |
| 1 | (Hungary) Gabriella Tóth | 2017 |
| 1 | (Denmark) Line Haugsted | 2024 |
| 1 | (Denmark) Kristina Jørgensen | 2025 |
| 1 | (France) Amandine Leynaud | 2019 |
| 1 | (France) Hatadou Sako | 2025 |
| 1 | (Montenegro) Jovanka Radičević | 2013 |
| 1 | (Montenegro) Katarina Bulatović | 2014 |
| 1 | (Norway) Kristine Breistøl | 2025 |
| 1 | (Norway) Silje Solberg | 2024 |
| 1 | (Germany) Anja Althaus | 2018 |
| 1 | (Romania) Crina Pintea | 2019 |
| 1 | (Serbia) Andrea Lekić | 2013 |
| 1 | (Spain) Mireya González | 2018 |
| 1 | (Slovenia) Ana Gros | 2024 |
| 1 | (Sweden) Anna Lagerquist | 2025 |
| 1 | (Tunisia) Asma Elghaoui | 2017 |

=== EHF Champions League FINAL4 Top Scorers ===
(All-Time) – Last updated on 6 June 2026
Every player that has scored at least 1 goal is included.

| Rank | Name | Goals |
|---|---|---|
| 1 | (Hungary) Anita Görbicz | 57 |
| 2 | (Brazil) Eduarda Amorim | 49 |
| 3 | (Norway) Stine Bredal Oftedal | 48 |
| 4 | (Norway) Kari Brattset Dale | 40 |
| 5 | (Netherlands) Nycke Groot | 37 |
| 6 | (France) Estelle Nze Minko | 34 |
| 7 | (Norway) Veronica Kristiansen | 27 |
| 8 | (Slovenia) Ana Gros | 24 |
| 9 | (Hungary) Bernadett Bódi | 21 |
| 9 | (Netherlands) Dione Housheer | 21 |
| 11 | (Denmark) Anne Mette Hansen | 20 |
| 11 | (Hungary) Viktória Győri-Lukács | 20 |
| 13 | (Norway) Heidi Løke | 19 |
| 14 | (Hungary) Csenge Fodor | 18 |
| 15 | (Sweden) Linn Blohm | 13 |
| 16 | (Hungary) Anikó Kovacsics | 12 |
| 16 | (Brazil) Bruna de Paula | 12 |
| 16 | (Hungary) Nadine Szöllősi-Schatzl | 12 |
| 16 | (South Korea) Ryu Eun-hee | 12 |
| 20 | (Netherlands) Yvette Broch | 11 |
| 21 | (Norway) Nora Mørk | 8 |
| 21 | (Montenegro) Katarina Bulatović | 7 |
| 21 | (Norway) Linn Jørum Sulland | 7 |
| 21 | (Hungary) Dorottya Faluvégi | 7 |
| 21 | (Denmark) Line Haugsted | 7 |
| 25 | (Hungary) Adrienn Orbán | 6 |
| 25 | (Romania) Crina Pintea | 6 |
| 27 | (Hungary) Zsuzsanna Tomori | 5 |
| 27 | (Czech Republic) Jana Knedlíková | 5 |
| 27 | (Denmark) Kristina Jørgensen | 5 |
| 27 | (Norway) Emilie Hovden | 5 |
| 31 | (Denmark) Helena Elver | 3 |
| 31 | (Netherlands) Kelly Dulfer | 3 |
| 33 | (Hungary) Júlia Hársfalvi | 2 |
| 33 | (Hungary) Dorina Korsós | 2 |
| 33 | (Norway) Silje Solberg | 2 |
| 33 | (Sweden) Anna Lagerquist | 2 |
| 34 | (Germany) Anja Althaus | 1 |
| 34 | (Denmark) Sandra Toft | 1 |
| 34 | (Hungary) Laura Kürthi | 1 |
| 34 | (Netherlands) Bo van Wetering | 1 |
| 34 | (Sweden) Nathalie Hagman | 1 |

== See also ==
- Győri ETO FC
- Győri ETO Futsal Club
- ETO-SZESE Győr FKC
