= Hungary women's national handball team =

Women's national handball team representing Hungary

Hungary

Information
- Association: Hungarian Handball Federation
- Coach: Vladimir Golovin
- Assistant coach: Zoltán Szilágyi
- Captain: Blanka Böde-Bíró
- Most caps: Marianna Nagy (281)
- Most goals: Anita Görbicz (1111)

Colours
1st	2nd

Results

Summer Olympics
- Appearances: 8 (First in 1976)
- Best result: 2nd (2000)

World Championship
- Appearances: 25 (First in 1957)
- Best result: 1st (1965)

European Championship
- Appearances: 16 (First in 1994)
- Best result: 1st (2000)
- Last updated on Unknown.

Hungary women's national handball team
Medal record

Olympic Games
Silver medal – second place	2000 Sydney	Team
Bronze medal – third place	1976 Montreal	Team
Bronze medal – third place	1996 Atlanta	Team

World Championship
Gold medal – first place	1965 West Germany	
Silver medal – second place	1957 Yugoslavia	
Silver medal – second place	1982 Hungary	
Silver medal – second place	1995 Austria/Hungary	
Silver medal – second place	2003 Croatia	
Bronze medal – third place	1971 Netherlands	
Bronze medal – third place	1975 USSR	
Bronze medal – third place	1978 Czechoslovakia	
Bronze medal – third place	2005 Russia	

European Championship
Gold medal – first place	2000 Romania	
Bronze medal – third place	1998 Netherlands	
Bronze medal – third place	2004 Hungary	
Bronze medal – third place	2012 Serbia	
Bronze medal – third place	2024 Austria/Hungary/Switzerland	

The Hungary women's national handball team (Hungarian: magyar női kézilabda-válogatott) is the national team of Hungary. It is governed by the Hungarian Handball Federation (Magyar Kézilabda Szövetség) and takes part in international handball competitions. The team won the World Championship in 1965 and the European Championship in 2000.

== Results ==
Champions Runners-up Third place Fourth place

=== Olympic Games ===
Since their debut in 1976, the team has participated in seven Olympic Games. Hungary won a silver medal in Sydney 2000.

Games	Round	Position	Pld	W	D	L	GF	GA	GD
(Canada) 1976 Montreal	Third place	3rd of 6	5	3	1	1	85	55	+30
(Soviet Union) 1980 Moscow	Fourth place	4th of 6	5	1	1	3	80	74	+6
(United States) 1984 Los Angeles	did not participate								
(South Korea) 1988 Seoul	did not qualify								
(Spain) 1992 Barcelona	did not qualify								
(United States) 1996 Atlanta	Third place	3rd of 8	5	3	0	2	126	127	−1
(Australia) 2000 Sydney	Runners-up	2nd of 10	7	4	1	2	202	187	+15
(Greece) 2004 Athens	Match for 5th place	5th of 10	7	5	1	1	215	178	+37
(China) 2008 Beijing	Fourth place	4th of 12	8	3	1	4	211	227	−16
(United Kingdom) 2012 London	did not qualify								
(Brazil) 2016 Rio de Janeiro	did not qualify								
(Japan) 2020 Tokyo	Quarterfinal	7th of 12	6	2	0	4	164	175	–11
(France) 2024 Paris	Quarterfinal	6th of 12	6	2	1	3	169	176	–7
(United States) 2028 Los Angeles	TBD								
Total	8/14	0 Titles	49	23	6	20	1352	1199	+53

=== World Championship ===
Hungary is regularly present at World Championships, having missed only 1990 and recently 2011. They won the tournament once in 1965 and have also received four silver and four bronze medals. In 2003, Hungary lost the final match against France 32–29 after one overtime.

Year	Position	Pld	W	D	L	GS	GA	±
(Socialist Federal Republic of Yugoslavia) 1957	2nd	5	2	1	2	29	26	+3
(Romania) 1962	5th	5	2	0	3	45	41	+4
(West Germany) 1965	1st	4	4	0	0	36	18	+18
(Netherlands) 1971	3rd	5	3	0	2	50	45	+5
(Socialist Federal Republic of Yugoslavia) 1973	4th	5	3	0	2	67	49	+18
(Soviet Union) 1975	3rd	7	5	0	2	97	61	+36
(Czech Republic) 1978	3rd	7	5	0	2	108	95	+13
(Hungary) 1982	2nd	7	5	1	1	145	111	+34
(Netherlands) 1986	8th	7	3	1	3	140	123	+17
(South Korea) 1990	did not qualify							
(Norway) 1993	7th	7	3	1	3	158	157	+1
(Austria) / (Hungary) 1995	2nd	8	7	0	1	196	153	+43
(Germany) 1997	9th	6	4	0	2	181	132	+44
(Denmark) / (Norway) 1999	5th	9	8	0	1	296	203	+93
(Italy) 2001	6th	9	6	0	3	255	234	+21
(Croatia) 2003	2nd	10	7	1	2	329	273	+56
(Russia) 2005	3rd	10	7	1	2	328	254	+74
(France) 2007	8th	10	4	2	4	310	300	+10
(China) 2009	9th	9	5	2	2	275	225	+50
(Brazil) 2011	did not qualify							
(Serbia) 2013	8th	7	4	0	3	192	166	+26
(Denmark) 2015	11th	6	4	0	2	165	152	+13
(Germany) 2017	15th	6	3	0	3	164	156	+8
(Japan) 2019	14th	7	3	0	4	200	169	+31
(Spain) 2021	10th	6	4	0	2	175	162	+13
(Denmark) / (Norway) / (Sweden) 2023	10th	6	4	0	2	167	124	+43
(Germany) / (Netherlands) 2025	7th	7	4	1	2	215	166	+49
(Hungary) 2027	Qualified as host							
(Spain) 2029	TBD							
(Czech Republic) / (Poland) 2031	TBD							
Total	26/30	175	109	11	55	4323	3594	+726

=== European Championship ===
As of 2026, the Hungarian team has participated in every European Championship that has taken place. They won the tournament in 2000, after beating Ukraine 32–30 in the final.

Year	Position	Pld	W	D	L	GS	GA	±
(Germany) 1994	4th	7	3	1	3	163	160	+3
(Denmark) 1996	10th	6	1	0	5	131	154	−23
(Netherlands) 1998	3rd	7	5	0	2	175	161	+14
(Romania) 2000	1st	7	6	1	0	216	169	+47
(Denmark) 2002	5th	7	5	0	2	223	204	+19
(Hungary) 2004	3rd	8	6	0	2	236	217	+19
(Sweden) 2006	5th	7	5	0	2	234	186	+48
(North Macedonia) 2008	8th	6	2	1	3	143	160	−17
(Denmark) / (Norway) 2010	10th	6	3	0	3	126	147	−21
(Serbia) 2012	3rd	8	4	0	4	219	226	−7
(Hungary) / (Croatia) 2014	6th	7	3	1	3	178	172	+6
(Sweden) 2016	12th	6	1	1	4	132	143	−11
(France) 2018	7th	6	4	0	2	163	164	−1
(Denmark) / (Norway) 2020	10th	6	2	0	4	156	166	−10
(Slovenia) / (North Macedonia) / (Montenegro) 2022	11th	6	2	0	4	154	165	−11
(Austria) / (Hungary) / (Switzerland) 2024	3rd	9	7	0	2	259	222	+37
(Czech Republic) / (Poland) / (Romania) / (Slovakia) / (Turkey) 2026	Qualified							
(Denmark) / (Norway) / (Sweden) 2028	TBD							
(Belgium) (France) 2030	TBD							
(Denmark) (Germany) (Poland) 2032	TBD							
Total	17/20	109	59	5	45	2908	2816	+92

=== Other tournaments ===
- Carpathian Trophy 1970 – Third place
- Carpathian Trophy 1971 – Second place
- Carpathian Trophy 1981 – Third place
- Carpathian Trophy 1984 – Second place
- Møbelringen Cup 2003 – Second place
- Carpathian Trophy 2011 – Third place
- Carpathian Trophy 2012 – Second place
- Carpathian Trophy 2016 – Winner
- Møbelringen Cup 2017 – Third place
- Møbelringen Cup 2018 – Fourth place

== Team ==
=== Current squad ===
The squad for the 2026 European Women's Handball Championship.

Head coach: Vladimir Golovin

No.	Pos.	Name	Date of birth (age)	Height	App.	Goals	Club
4	P	Petra Tóvizi	15 March 1999 (age 27)	1.78 m	116	155	(Hungary) Debreceni VSC
5	LB	Luca Csíkos	25 February 2005 (age 21)	1.79 m	21	24	(Germany) Thüringer HC
8	P	Kata Juhász	2 January 2004 (age 22)	1.86 m	4	2	(Hungary) Debreceni VSC
9	LW	Júlia Hársfalvi	12 November 1996 (age 30)	1.68 m	23	43	(Hungary) Ferencvárosi TC
10	LB	Lea Faragó	22 July 2005 (age 21)	1.75 m	19	25	(Hungary) Esztergomi KC
14	CB	Blanka Kajdon	12 June 2002 (age 24)	1.71 m	3	0	(Hungary) Váci NKSE
16	GK	Blanka Böde-Bíró	22 September 1994 (age 32)	1.87 m	137	3	(Hungary) Ferencvárosi TC
18	RW	Anett Kovács	12 November 1994 (age 32)	1.68 m	28	51	(Hungary) Esztergomi KC
19	LW	Gréta Márton	3 October 1999 (age 27)	1.73 m	114	276	(Hungary) Ferencvárosi TC
20	LP	Apollónia Szmolek	8 August 2002 (age 24)	1.87 m	17	7	(Hungary) Esztergomi KC
28	RB	Nikoletta Papp	23 July 1996 (age 30)	1.82 m	90	76	(Romania) CSM Slatina
31	GK	Zsófi Szemerey	2 June 1994 (age 32)	1.83 m	56	2	(Hungary) Győri Audi ETO KC
38	CB	Petra Vámos	14 September 2000 (age 26)	1.75 m	108	300	(France) Metz Handball
42	RB	Katrin Klujber	21 April 1999 (age 27)	1.70 m	116	632	(Hungary) Ferencvárosi TC
48	RW	Dorottya Faluvégi	31 March 1998 (age 28)	1.70 m	58	87	(Romania) CSM București
59	LB	Csenge Kuczora	26 January 2000 (age 26)	1.76 m	79	254	(Romania) CSM București
66	RW	Viktória Győri-Lukács	31 October 1995 (age 31)	1.68 m	141	446	(Hungary) Győri Audi ETO KC
74	GK	Anna Bukovszky	30 June 2002 (age 24)	1.75 m	16	0	(Hungary) Esztergomi KC
88	LB	Fanni Horváth	29 October 2005 (age 21)	1.74 m	0	0	(Hungary) Esztergomi KC

=== Extended squad / Recent call ups ===
No.	Pos.	Name	Date of birth (age)	Height	App.	Goals	Club
7	CB	Anna Kukely	27 May 2003 (age 23)	1.73 m	4	2	(Hungary) Mosonmagyaróvári KC SE
11	RB	Anna Albek	2 December 2001 (age 24)	1.89 m	51	79	(France) Metz Handball
14	LB	Eszter Ogonovszky	14 July 2003 (age 23)	1.78 m	1	0	(Hungary) Vasas SC
17	RW	Laura Falusi-Udvardi	17 July 1997 (age 29)	1.65 m	9	18	(Hungary) Mosonmagyaróvári KC SE
23	LW	Csenge Fodor	23 April 1999 (age 27)	1.69 m	10	3	(Hungary) Győri Audi ETO KC
26	LP	Luca Faragó	11 October 2002 (age 24)	1.75 m	2	1	(Hungary) Mosonmagyaróvári KC SE
45	LB	Noémi Háfra	5 October 1998 (age 28)	1.79 m	76	203	(Hungary) Váci NKSE
52	LB	Gréta Juhász	2 May 2002 (age 24)	1.80 m	21	31	(Hungary) Váci NKSE
58	P	Réka Bordás	26 August 1997 (age 29)	1.85 m	89	67	(Hungary) Ferencvárosi TC
61	GK	Kinga Janurik	6 November 1991 (age 35)	1.76 m	87	1	(Romania) CSM Corona Brașov
71	LW	Mirtill Petrus	14 November 2001 (age 25)	1.68 m	7	5	(Hungary) Debreceni VSC
77	CB	Petra Simon	12 November 2004 (age 22)	1.68 m	59	188	(Hungary) Ferencvárosi TC

=== Technical staff ===
- Head coach: Vladimir Golovin
- Assistant coach: Zoltán Szilágyi
- Goalkeeping coach: Péter Tatai
- Doctor: Balázs Lohner
- Physiotherapist: Daniel Sándor

=== Retired numbers ===
Hungary women's national handball team
No.	Player	Position	Years	Appearances	Goals
13	(Hungary) Anita Görbicz	Centre Back	2002–2017	232	1111

=== Notable players ===
IHF World Player of the Year

- Erzsébet Kocsis (right back), 1995
- Bojana Radulović (right back), 2000 and 2003
- Anita Kulcsár (line player), 2004
- Anita Görbicz (centre back), 2005

MVP

- Beáta Siti (centre back), 2000 European Championship

All-Star Team members

- Katalin Szilágyi (right wing), 1995 World Championship
- Erzsébet Kocsis (line player), 1996 Summer Olympics
- Dóra Lőwy (left wing), 1999 World Championship
- Bojana Radulović (right back), 2000 Summer Olympics, 2003 World Championship
- Beáta Siti (centre back), 2000 European Championship
- Beatrix Balogh (right wing), 2001 World Championship
- Anita Görbicz (centre back), 2003 World Championship, 2005 World Championship, 2007 World Championship, 2013 World Championship
- Ibolya Mehlmann (right back), 2006 European Championship
- Orsolya Vérten (left wing), 2008 Summer Olympics
- Noémi Háfra (left back), 2018 European Championship
- Katrin Klujber (right back), 2022 European Championship, 2024 Summer Olympics, 2024 European Championship
- Viktória Győri-Lukács (right wing), 2024 EHF Excellence Award All-Star, 2024 European Championship
- Petra Simon (centre back), 2024 European Championship (best young player)

Top Scorers

- Ágnes Farkas (left back), 2002 European Championship (58 goals)
- Bojana Radulović (right back), 2003 World Championship (97 goals), 2004 Summer Olympics (54 goals), 2004 European Championship (72 goals)
- Katrin Klujber (right back), 2024 European Championship (60 goals)

Other notable players

- Katalin Pálinger
- Magda Jóna
- Ildikó Pádár
- Marianna Gódorné Nagy
- Amália Sterbinszky
- Beatrix Kökény
- Beáta Hoffmann
- Krisztina Pigniczki
- Marianna Racz

Captains

- Katalin Pálinger – 2008 Summer Olympics, 2008 European Championship, 2010 European Championship
- Orsolya Vérten – 2009 World Championship
- Anita Görbicz – 2012 European Championship, 2013 World Championship, 2015 World Championship, 2016 European Championship, 2017 World Championship
- Zsuzsanna Tomori – 2014 European Championship
- Anikó Kovacsics – 2018 European Championship, 2019 World Championship, 2020 European Championship, 2020 Summer Olympics
- Blanka Bíró – 2021 World Championship, 2023 World Championship, 2024 Summer Olympics, 2024 European Championship
- Dóra Hornyák – 2022 European Championship

=== Past squads ===
1957 World Championship (Second placed)

Éva Arany, Zsuzsa Béres, Borbála Cselőtei, Árpádné Csicsmányi, Katalin Gardó, Ferencné Geszti, Gyuláné Hanczmann, Magda Jóna, Magda Kiss, Aranka Rachel-Segal, Lídia Simonek, Éva Szendi, Mária Vályi, Erika Wéser.

Coach: Bódog Török

1962 World Championship (Fifth placed)

Éva Arany, Elemérné Bakó, Márta Balogh, Lajosné Cserháti, Béláné Fodor, Ágnes Hanus, Klára Höbenreich, Magda Jóna, Erzsébet Pásztor, Anna Rothermel, Éva Szendi, Judit Szűcs, Mária Tóth, Ilona Urbán, Zsuzsa Varga, Ágnes Végh.

Coach: Bódog Török

1965 World Championship (Winner)

Ágnes Babos, Márta Balogh, Erzsébet Bognár, Márta Giba, Ágnes Hanus, Mária Holub, Ilona Ignácz, Magda Jóna, Erzsébet Lengyel, Erzsébet Pásztor, Anna Rothermel, Mária Tóth, Zsuzsanna Varga, Ágnes Végh.

Coach: Bódog Török

1971 World Championship (Third placed)

Ágnes Babos, Erzsébet Bognár, Ágota Bujdosó, Erzsébet Drozdik, Márta Giba, Klára Horváth, Éva Kovács, Erzsébet Nyári, Mária Polszter, Anna Rothermel, Amália Sterbinszky, Ilona Szabó, Rozália Tomann, Borbála Tóth Harsányi, Katalin Tóth Harsányi.

Coach: Bódog Török

1973 World Championship (Fourth placed)

Mária Berzsenyi, Ágota Bujdosó, Márta Giba, Klára Horváth, Piroska Németh, Erzsébet Nyári, Márta Pacsai, Anna Rothermel, Amália Sterbinszky, Katalin Tavaszi, Rozália Tomann, Borbála Tóth Harsányi, Katalin Tóth Harsányi, Mária Vanya.

Coach: Bódog Török

1975 World Championship (Third placed)

Éva Angyal, Mária Berzsenyi, Ágota Bujdosó, Klára Horváth, Ilona Nagy, Marianna Nagy, Erzsébet Németh, Márta Pacsai, Zsuzsanna Pethő, Ilona Samus, Amália Sterbinszky, Katalin Tavaszi, Rozália Tomann, Katalin Tóth Harsányi, Mária Vanya, Krisztina Wohner.

Coach: Bódog Török

1976 Summer Olympics (Third placed)

Éva Angyal, Mária Berzsenyi, Ágota Bujdosó, Klára Horváth, Ilona Nagy, Marianna Nagy, Erzsébet Németh, Márta Pacsai, Zsuzsanna Pethő, Amália Sterbinszky, Rozália Tomann, Borbála Tóth Harsányi, Katalin Tóth Harsányi, Mária Vanya.

Coach: Bódog Török

1978 World Championship (Third placed)

Éva Angyal, Mária Berzsenyi, Éva Bozó, Klára Éliás, Györgyi Győrvári, Mária Hajós, Erika Magyar, Ilona Nagy, Marianna Nagy, Erzsébet Németh, Ilona Samus, Amália Sterbinszky, Anikó Szabadfi, Rozália Tomann, Mária Vanya, Krisztina Wohner.

Coach: Bódog Török

1980 Summer Olympics (Fourth placed)

Éva Angyal, Mária Berzsenyi, Klára Bonyhádi, Éva Bozó, Piroska Budai, Györgyi Győrvári, Klára Horváth, Marianna Nagy, Erzsébet Németh, Erzsébet Nyári, Ilona Samus, Amália Sterbinszky, Rozália Tomann, Mária Vanya.

Coach: Mihály Lele

1982 World Championship (Second placed)

Valéria Agocs, Éva Angyal, Ildikó Barna, Klára Bonyhádi, Katalin Gombai, Anna György, Györgyi Győrvári, Klára Horváth, Gabriella Jakab, Marianna Nagy, Erzsébet Németh, Erzsébet Nyári, Zsuzsa Nyári, Mariann Rácz, Amália Sterbinszky, Mária Vanya.

Coach: János Csík

1986 World Championship (Eighth placed)

Mária Ácsbog, Ildikó Barna, Erika Csapó, Csilla Elekes, Éva Erdős, Marianna Nagy, Erzsébet Németh, Anna György, Éva Kiss, Éva Kovács, Katalin Major, Zsuzsa Nyári, Csilla Orbán, Mariann Rácz, Katalin Szilágyi, Ágota Utasi, Márta Varga.

Coach: Zsolt Barabás

1993 World Championship (Seventh placed)

Erika Csapó, Edit Csendes, Éva Erdős, Ágnes Farkas, Beáta Hoffmann, Erzsébet Kocsis, Beatrix Kökény, Eszter Mátéfi, Anikó Meksz, Helga Németh, Erika Oravecz, Melinda Szabó, Katalin Szilágyi, Brigitta Szopóczy, Ágota Utasi, Márta Varga.

Coach: László Laurencz

1994 European Championship (Fourth placed)

Beatrix Balogh, Edit Csendes, Rita Deli, Ágnes Farkas, Rita Hochrajter, Beáta Hoffmann, Erzsébet Kocsis, Beatrix Kökény, Anikó Meksz, Helga Németh, Ildikó Pádár, Anna Szántó, Brigitta Szopóczy, Beatrix Tóth, Ágota Utasi.

Coach: László Laurencz

1995 World Championship (Second placed)

Éva Erdős, Andrea Farkas, Ágnes Farkas, Beáta Hoffmann, Anikó Kántor, Erzsébet Kocsis, Beatrix Kökény, Eszter Mátéfi, Anikó Meksz, Anikó Nagy, Helga Németh, Ildikó Pádár, Beáta Siti, Anna Szántó, Katalin Szilágyi, Beatrix Tóth.

Coach: László Laurencz

1996 Summer Olympics (Third placed)

Éva Erdős, Andrea Farkas, Beáta Hoffmann, Anikó Kántor, Erzsébet Kocsis, Beatrix Kökény, Eszter Mátéfi, Auguszta Mátyás, Anikó Meksz, Anikó Nagy, Helga Németh, Ildikó Pádár, Beáta Siti, Anna Szántó, Katalin Szilágyi, Beatrix Tóth.

Coach: László Laurencz

1996 European Championship (Tenth placed)

Beatrix Balogh, Rita Borók, Éva Erdős, Andrea Farkas, Beáta Hoffmann, Klára Kertész, Erzsébet Kocsis, Anita Kulcsár, Eszter Mátéfi, Anikó Meksz, Anikó Nagy, Beáta Siti, Éva Szarka, Gabriella Takács, Beatrix Tóth, Anasztázia Virincsik.

Coach: László Laurencz

1997 World Championship (Ninth placed)

Beatrix Balogh, Rita Borók, Rita Deli, Éva Erdős, Andrea Farkas, Ágnes Farkas, Anikó Kántor, Fanni Kenyeres, Anita Kulcsár, Anikó Meksz, Helga Németh, Ildikó Pádár, Katalin Pálinger, Zsófia Pásztor, Melinda Szabó, Gabriella Takács.

Coach: János Csík

1998 European Championship (Third placed)

Beatrix Balogh, Rita Deli, Ágnes Farkas, Andrea Farkas, Anikó Kántor, Beatrix Kökény, Anita Kulcsár, Anikó Meksz, Anikó Nagy, Helga Németh, Ildikó Pádár, Katalin Pálinger, Krisztina Pigniczki, Judit Simics, Beáta Siti, Gabriella Takács.

Coach: Lajos Mocsai

1999 World Championship (Fifth placed)

Beatrix Balogh, Nikolett Brigovácz, Rita Deli, Andrea Farkas, Ágnes Farkas, Anikó Kántor, Beatrix Kökény, Anita Kulcsár, Dóra Lőwy, Anikó Nagy, Ildikó Pádár, Katalin Pálinger, Krisztina Pigniczki, Judit Simics, Beáta Siti, Gabriella Takács.

Coach: Lajos Mocsai

2000 Summer Olympics (Second placed)

Beatrix Balogh, Rita Deli, Ágnes Farkas, Andrea Farkas, Anikó Kántor, Beatrix Kökény, Anita Kulcsár, Dóra Lőwy, Anikó Nagy, Ildikó Pádár, Katalin Pálinger, Krisztina Pigniczki, Bojana Radulovics, Judit Simics, Beáta Siti.

Coach: Lajos Mocsai

2000 European Championship (Winner)

Nikolett Brigovácz, Ágnes Farkas, Anikó Kántor, Gabriella Kindl, Erika Kirsner, Beatrix Kökény, Anita Kulcsár, Krisztina Nagy, Ildikó Pádár, Katalin Pálinger, Zsuzsanna Pálffy, Krisztina Pigniczki, Judit Simics, Beáta Siti, Eszter Siti, Tímea Sugár.

Coach: Lajos Mocsai

2001 World Championship (Sixth placed)

Beatrix Balogh, Rita Borók, Rita Deli, Andrea Farkas, Ágnes Farkas, Gabriella Kindl, Erika Kirsner, Anita Kulcsár, Ildikó Pádár, Zsuzsanna Pálffy, Katalin Pálinger, Krisztina Pigniczki, Bojana Radulovics, Beáta Siti, Eszter Siti, Tímea Sugár.

Coach: Lajos Mocsai

2002 European Championship (Fifth placed)

Beatrix Balogh, Ágnes Farkas, Anita Görbicz, Erika Kirsner, Anita Kulcsár, Zsuzsanna Lovász, Ibolya Mehlmann, Helga Németh, Ildikó Pádár, Katalin Pálinger, Krisztina Pigniczki, Eszter Siti, Tímea Sugár, Hortenzia Szrnka, Tímea Tóth, Orsolya Vérten.

Coach: Lajos Mocsai

2003 World Championship (Second placed)

Beáta Bohus, Ágnes Farkas, Bernadett Ferling, Anita Görbicz, Erika Kirsner, Anita Kulcsár, Zsuzsanna Lovász, Ibolya Mehlmann, Katalin Pálinger, Krisztina Pigniczki, Bojana Radulovics, Eszter Siti, Irina Sirina, Tímea Sugár, Hortenzia Szrnka, Tímea Tóth.

Coach: Lajos Mocsai

2004 Summer Olympics (Fifth placed)

Beáta Bohus, Ágnes Farkas, Bernadett Ferling, Anita Görbicz, Erika Kirsner, Anita Kulcsár, Zsuzsanna Lovász, Ibolya Mehlmann, Katalin Pálinger, Zsuzsanna Pálffy, Krisztina Pigniczki, Bojana Radulovics, Irina Sirina, Eszter Siti, Tímea Tóth.

Coach: Lajos Mocsai

2004 European Championship (Third placed)

Beatrix Balogh, Beáta Bohus, Bernadett Ferling, Anita Görbicz, Gabriella Kindl, Anita Kulcsár, Zsuzsanna Lovász, Ibolya Mehlmann, Ivett Nagy, Katalin Pálinger, Krisztina Pigniczki, Bojana Radulovics, Irina Sirina, Eszter Siti, Gabriella Szűcs, Tímea Tóth.

Coach: Szilárd Kiss

2005 World Championship (Third placed)

Beatrix Balogh, Rita Borbás, Bernadett Ferling, Anita Görbicz, Ágnes Hornyák, Fanni Kenyeres, Gabriella Kindl, Mónika Kovacsicz, Ibolya Mehlmann, Cecília Őri, Katalin Pálinger, Eszter Siti, Tímea Sugár, Gabriella Szűcs, Tímea Tóth, Orsolya Vérten.

Coach: András Németh

2006 European Championship (Fifth placed)

Beatrix Balogh, Rita Borbás, Zsanett Borbély, Bernadett Ferling, Anita Görbicz, Orsolya Herr, Ágnes Hornyák, Erika Kirsner, Mónika Kovacsicz, Ibolya Mehlmann, Katalin Pálinger, Eszter Siti, Piroska Szamoránsky, Gabriella Szűcs, Tímea Tóth, Orsolya Vérten.

Coach: András Németh

2007 World Championship (Eighth placed)

Beatrix Balogh, Rita Borbás, Bernadett Ferling, Anita Görbicz, Orsolya Herr, Ágnes Hornyák, Erika Kirsner, Mónika Kovacsicz, Ibolya Mehlmann, Katalin Pálinger, Piroska Szamoránsky, Gabriella Szűcs, Zita Szucsánszki, Zsuzsanna Tomori, Tímea Tóth, Orsolya Vérten.

Coach: András Németh

2008 Summer Olympics (Fourth placed)

Bernadett Bódi, Rita Borbás, Bernadett Ferling, Anita Görbicz, Orsolya Herr, Ágnes Hornyák, Mónika Kovacsicz, Katalin Pálinger, Krisztina Pigniczki, Piroska Szamoránsky, Gabriella Szűcs, Zsuzsanna Tomori, Tímea Tóth, Orsolya Vérten.

Coach: János Hajdu

2008 European Championship (Eighth placed)

Barbara Balogh, Bernadett Bódi, Anita Bulath, Anita Görbicz, Orsolya Herr, Ágnes Hornyák, Mónika Kovacsicz, Katalin Pálinger, Melinda Pastrovics, Anett Sopronyi, Piroska Szamoránsky, Gabriella Szűcs, Zita Szucsánszki, Zsuzsanna Tomori, Orsolya Vérten, Melinda Vincze.

Coach: Vilmos Imre

2009 World Championship (Ninth placed)

Bernadett Bódi, Anita Bulath, Orsolya Herr, Gabriella Juhász, Anikó Kovacsics, Adrienn Orbán, Melinda Pastrovics, Valéria Szabó, Klára Szekeres, Zita Szucsánszki, Zsuzsanna Tomori, Katalin Tóth, Tímea Tóth, Ágnes Triffa, Orsolya Vérten, Szandra Zácsik.

Coach: Eszter Mátéfi

2010 European Championship (Tenth placed)

Szilvia Ábrahám, Bernadett Bódi, Anita Bulath, Orsolya Herr, Anikó Kovacsics, Mónika Kovacsicz, Katalin Pálinger, Anett Sopronyi, Valéria Szabó, Piroska Szamoránsky, Klára Szekeres, Zita Szucsánszki, Bernadett Temes, Zsuzsanna Tomori, Tímea Tóth, Orsolya Vérten, Melinda Vincze.

Coach: Eszter Mátéfi

2012 European Championship (Third placed)

Bernadett Bódi, Anita Bulath, Anita Görbicz, Orsolya Herr, Éva Kiss, Kinga Klivinyi, Anikó Kovacsics, Mónika Kovacsicz, Viktória Rédei Soós, Valéria Szabó, Piroska Szamoránsky, Klára Szekeres, Zita Szucsánszki, Zsuzsanna Tomori, Krisztina Triscsuk, Orsolya Vérten, Melinda Vincze.

Coach: Karl Erik Bøhn

2013 World Championship (Eighth placed)

Bernadett Bódi, Anita Bulath, Anita Cifra, Anita Görbicz, Orsolya Herr, Éva Kiss, Anikó Kovacsics, Mónika Kovacsicz, Viktória Rédei Soós, Piroska Szamoránszky, Klára Szekeres, Zita Szucsánszki, Zsuzsanna Tomori, Krisztina Triscsuk, Orsolya Vérten, Melinda Vincze, Szandra Zácsik.

Coach: János Hajdu

2014 European Championship (Sixth placed)

Blanka Bíró, Bernadett Bódi, Anita Bulath, Ildikó Erdősi, Orsolya Herr, Kinga Klivinyi, Anikó Kovacsics, Mónika Kovacsicz, Szabina Mayer, Rea Mészáros, Szimonetta Planéta, Piroska Szamoránszky, Zita Szucsánszki, Bernadett Temes, Zsuzsanna Tomori, Gabriella Tóth, Krisztina Triscsuk.

Coach: András Németh

2015 World Championship (Eleventh placed)

Blanka Bíró, Bernadett Bódi, Anita Bulath, Ildikó Erdősi, Anita Görbicz, Dóra Hornyák, Éva Kiss, Anikó Kovacsics, Mónika Kovacsicz, Szabina Mayer, Szimonetta Planéta, Piroska Szamoránszky, Klára Szekeres, Zita Szucsánszki, Zsuzsanna Tomori, Krisztina Triscsuk, Szandra Zácsik.

Coach: András Németh

2016 European Championship (Twelfth placed)

Bernadett Bódi, Luca Dombi, Ildikó Erdősi, Anita Görbicz, Dóra Hornyák, Kinga Janurik, Anett Kisfaludy, Éva Kiss, Kinga Klivinyi, Anna Kovács, Viktória Lukács, Rea Mészáros, Szimonetta Planéta, Nadine Schatzl, Klára Szekeres, Melinda Szikora, Krisztina Triscsuk.

Coach: Kim Rasmussen

2017 World Championship (Fifteenth placed)

Blanka Bíró, Bernadett Bódi, Anita Görbicz, Noémi Háfra, Kinga Janurik, Anett Kisfaludy, Kinga Klivinyi, Anikó Kovacsics, Anna Kovács, Viktória Lukács, Szabina Mayer, Rea Mészáros, Nadine Schatzl, Klára Szekeres, Szandra Szöllősi-Zácsik, Zita Szucsánszki, Gabriella Tóth.

Coach: Kim Rasmussen

2018 European Championship (Seventh placed)

Blanka Bíró, Noémi Háfra, Anita Kazai, Éva Kiss, Anikó Kovacsics, Anna Kovács, Rita Lakatos, Viktória Lukács, Rea Mészáros, Adrienn Orbán, Barbara Pálos-Bognár, Szimonetta Planéta, Nadine Schatzl, Laura Szabó, Babett Szalai, Gabriella Tóth, Petra Tóvizi.

Coach: Kim Rasmussen

2019 World Championship (Fourteenth placed)

Blanka Bíró, Dorottya Faluvégi, Noémi Háfra, Éva Kiss, Nikolett Kiss, Katrin Klujber, Anikó Kovacsics, Anna Kovács, Viktória Lukács, Gréta Márton, Noémi Pásztor, Nadine Schatzl, Laura Szabó, Zsuzsanna Tomori, Gabriella Tóth, Petra Tóvizi, Ágnes Triffa, Petra Vámos.

Coach: Kim Rasmussen

=== Coaching history ===
Period	Head coach
1956–1978	(Hungary) Bódog Török
1979–1980	(Hungary) Mihály Lele
1980–1985	(Hungary) János Csík
1986–1987	(Hungary) Zsolt Barabás
1988–1989	(Hungary) István Szabó
1990–1996	(Hungary) László Laurencz
1997	(Hungary) János Csík
1998	(Hungary) András Németh / (Hungary) Gyula Zsiga
1998–2004	(Hungary) Lajos Mocsai
2004	(Hungary) Szilárd Kiss
2005–2008	(Hungary) András Németh
2008	(Hungary) János Hajdu
2008–2009	(Hungary) Vilmos Imre
2009–2011	(Hungary) Eszter Mátéfi
2011–2013	(Norway) Karl Erik Bøhn
2013–2014	(Hungary) János Hajdu
2014–2016	(Hungary) András Németh
2016	(Spain) Ambros Martín / (Hungary) Gábor Elek
2016–2020	(Denmark) Kim Rasmussen
2020	(Hungary) Gábor Danyi / (Hungary) Gábor Elek
2021	(Hungary) Gábor Elek
2021–	(Hungary) Vladimir Golovin

=== Individual all-time records ===
Still active players are highlighted.

==== Most matches played ====
Total number of matches played in official competitions only.

#	Player	Matches	Goals
1	Mariann Gódorné Nagy	281	
2	Éva Erdős	270	711
3	Katalin Pálinger	254	1
4	Beatrix Kökény	245	542
5	Éva Angyal	242	
5	Anna György	242	
7	Amália Sterbinszky	239	
8	Anita Görbicz	233	1,111
9	Sándorné Csajbók	230	
9	Józsefné Vadász	230	

Last updated: 11 April 2025
Source: kezitortenelem.hu

==== Most goals scored ====
Total number of goals scored in official matches only.

#	Player	Goals	Matches	Average
1	Anita Görbicz	1,111	233	4.76
2	Ágnes Farkas	944	206	4.58
3	Éva Erdős	711	270	2.63
4	Katalin Szilágyi	627	179	3.50
5	Katrin Klujber	591	110	5.37
6	Beatrix Kökény	542	245	2.12
7	Helga Németh	490	142	3.45
8	Tímea Tóth	488	155	3.14
9	Zsuzsanna Tomori	467	191	2.45
10	Bojana Radulovics	463	69	6.71

Last updated: 11 April 2025
Source: kezitortenelem.hu

== See also ==
- Hungary women's national junior handball team
- Hungary women's national youth handball team
