= 1999–2000 Nemzeti Bajnokság I (women's handball) =

NB I
- Season: 1999–2000 (49.)

The 1999–2000 Nemzeti Bajnokság I is the 49th season of the Nemzeti Bajnokság I, Hungary's premier Handball league.

== Team information ==
Location of teams in 1999-00 Nemzeti Bajnokság I

The following 12 clubs compete in the NB I during the 1999–2000 season:

Team	Location	Arena	Capacity
Békéscsaba	Békéscsaba	Városi Sportcsarnok	2,300
Bp. Spartacus	Budapest	Spartacus sporttelep	
Debreceni VSC	Debrecen	Hódos Imre Sportcsarnok	1,800
Dunaferr	Dunaújváros	Dunaferr Sportcsarnok	1,200
Fehérvár KC	Székesfehérvár	KÖFÉM Sportcsarnok	1,000
Ferencváros	Budapest	Kőbányai úti sportcsarnok	1,300
Győri ETO	Győr	Magvassy Mihály Sportcsarnok	2,800
Marcali	Marcali	Városi Sportcsarnok	500
Orosháza	Orosháza		
Szekszárd	Szekszárd	Városi Sportközpont	1,200
Vasas	Budapest	Vasas Sportcsarnok	1,500
Vác	Vác	Városi Sportcsarnok	620

== Regular season (Alapszakasz) ==
	Team	Pld	W	D	L	GF	GA	Diff	Pts	Qualification or relegation
1	Herz-FTC	22	20	0	2	768	483	+285	40	2000-01 EHF Champions League Group Stage
2	Győri Graboplast ETO KC	22	19	0	3	692	499	+193	38	2000-01 EHF Champions League Round 2
3	Dunaferr SE	22	19	0	3	729	490	+239	38	2000-01 EHF Cup Winners' Cup round 3 ^{1}
4	DVSC-Valdor	22	13	1	8	543	537	+6	27	2000-01 EHF Cup round 3
5	Cornexi-Alcoa	22	11	2	9	596	572	+24	24	2000-01 EHF Cup round 2
6	Synergon SE Vác	22	9	2	11	625	656	−31	20	
7	Vasas-Hungaroweiss	22	9	1	12	531	569	−38	19	
8	AGRO SE Orosháza	22	7	3	12	519	601	−82	17	
9	Békéscsabai NKC	22	5	5	12	546	634	−86	15	
10	Ferropatent Szekszárd SE	22	5	2	15	496	703	−207	12	Relegation to Nemzeti Bajnokság I/B ^{2}
11	Marcali VSZSE	22	5	1	6	520	684	−164	11	
12	Bp. Spartacus SC	22	0	3	19	547	684	−137	3	

Pld - Played; W - Won; D - Drawn; L - Lost; GF - Goals for; GA - Goals against; Diff - Difference; Pts - Points.

^{1} Dunaferr SE entered 2000-01 Cup Winners' Cup as winners of 1999–2000 Magyar Kupa.

1999–2000 Nemzeti Bajnokság I champions

Herz-FTC
Ninth title

Team roster

Mónika Bárdos, Nikolett Brigovácz, Julianna Cioculeas, Rita Deli, Erika Kirsner, Beatrix Kökény, Veronika Kovács, Dóra Lőwy, Ildikó Pádár, Zsófia Pászor, Eszter Siti, Tímea Sugár, Enikő Tóth and Alexandra Wolf.
Head coach: András Németh.

== Season statistics ==
=== Top goalscorers ===
Rank	Player	Team	Goals
1	(Hungary) Rita Deli	Herz-FTC	

=== Number of teams by counties ===
	County (megye)	No. teams	Teams
1	Budapest	3	Bp. Spartacus, Ferencváros and Vasas
2	Békés	2	Békéscsaba and Orosháza
2	Fejér	2	Dunaferr and Fehérvár KC
4	Hajdú-Bihar	1	Debreceni VSC
4	Győr-Moson-Sopron	1	Győri ETO
4	Pest	1	Vác
4	Somogy	1	Marcali
4	Tolna	1	Szekszárd

== Sources ==
- magyar bajnokságok - kezitortenelem.hu (in Hungarian)
