= Anikó =

- Gender: Feminine
- Language: Hungarian
- Name day: 26 July

Other names
- Nicknames: Ani, Ancsa
- Anglicisation: Annie
- Related names: Anna, Hanna, Anita, Anett

Anikó is a Hungarian female given name, derived from Anna.

== Variant forms ==
Alternative forms of Anikó:

- Anka
- Annika
- Anda
- Anett
- Anica
- Anika
- Anita

== People ==
- Anikó Kapros, Professional Hungarian tennis player
- Anikó Pelle, International water polo player from Hungary
- Anikó Szebenszky, Hungarian race walker
- Anikó Kántor, Hungarian handball player and Olympic medalist
- Anikó Nagy, Hungarian handball player and Olympic medalist
- Anikó Góg, Hungarian athlete
- Anikó Meksz, Hungarian handball player
- Hannah Szenes (or Chana Senesh, originally Szenes Anikó)
