= Eszter Mátéfi =

Hungarian handball player (born 1966)

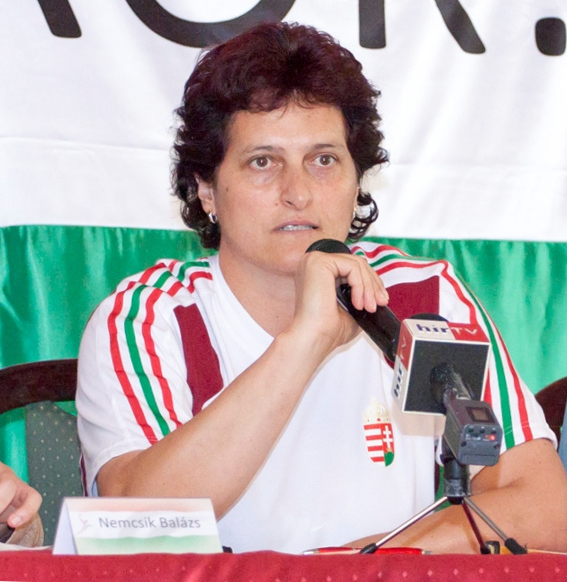

Personal information
- Full name: Eszter Mátéfi
- Nationality: Hungarian, Romanian
- Born: 14 February 1966 (age 60) Band, Magyar Autonomous Region, SR Romania

Sport
- Sport: Handball
- Position: left back

Senior clubs
- Years: Team
- 1981–1991: CSS Târgu Mureş
- 1992–1993: Debreceni VSC
- 1993–1997: Győri ETO KC
- 1997–1999: Dunaújváros
National team
Years	Team	Apps	(Gls)
1985–1991	Romania	131	(426)
1995–1997	Hungary	58	(259)

Teams managed
- 1999–2000: Dunaújváros (youth coach)
- 2000–2005: Dunaújváros (assistant coach)
- 2005: Hungary Women Junior
- 2007–2010: Békéscsabai ENKSE
- 2009–2011: Hungary Women
- 2012–2015: Dunaújvárosi Kohász KA
- 2016–2018: Kisvárdai KC
- 2019–2020: Dunaújvárosi Kohász KA (professional director)
- 2021–2022: Békéscsabai ENKSE (professional director)
Medal record
Representing Hungary
Olympic Games
Bronze medal – third place	1996 Atlanta	Team
World Championship
Silver medal – second place	1995 Austria and Hungary	Team

Eszter Mátéfi (born Eszter László; 14 February 1966 in Band, Magyar Autonomous Region, SR Romania) is a handball coach and former handball player.

== Career ==
Mátéfi, an ethnic Hungarian from Transylvania, began her career by CSS Târgu Mureş, from where she also made to the Romanian national selection and later became the captain of the team. Her best results with Romania were a fourth place in the 1989 World Championship and a fifth place on the World event three years earlier.

Following the cessation of her club, the left back moved to Hungary in January 1992, having signed by Debrecen. From 1993 to 1997 Mátéfi played for Győri ETO KC. In 1995 she obtained the Hungarian citizenship thus became eligible to get picked for the Hungarian national team, and Mátéfi won the silver medal right on her first major tournament, the 1995 World Championship. A year later on the Olympic Games in Atlanta she collected the bronze medal. Mátéfi spent her the final years of her active career by Dunaferr, with them she achieved her biggest successes on club level: beside the domestic double in 1998 and 1999 she first won the EHF Cup title (1998), then triumphed in the EHF Champions Leaguge (1999).

Mátéfi received her coaching diploma yet in 1998 and after retiring from professional handball in 1999 she began to train the youth sides of Dunaferr. Later she was promoted to assistant coach and also had spells by the Hungarian national team in younger age categories. She got her first head coaching job in 2007 from Békéscsabai Előre NKSE. The team, that climbed back to the top-tier division just in 2006, performed under the guidance of Mátéfi superbly and reached the fourth place in the Hungarian championship both in 2009 and 2010, in this way winning the right to take part in the EHF Cup.

In the summer of 2009 she was appointed as the head coach of the Hungarian women's national team, replacing Vilmos Imre in the position. Mátéfi remained in charge both by her club and the national team until November 2010, when Beáta Bohus took the coaching seat of Békéscsaba to help her to be able to concentrate fully on her international duties. However, during the reign of Mátéfi the Hungarian team slightly underperformed, finishing ninth at the 2009 World Championship and tenth at the 2010 European Championship. Hungary eventually got knocked out by Germany in the 2011 World Championship qualifying play-offs, thereupon Mátéfi resigned in June 2011.

Mátéfi returned to coaching in November 2011, when she was named the head coach of the recently established handball academy in Dunaújváros. A year later, in July 2012 she took over the senior club of Dunaújvárosi Kohász KA. On 8 October 2015 she got replaced by the Croatian coach Zdravko Zovko at Dunaújváros. Since 2016 she was the technical director of Kisvárdai KC. In January 2018 she left the team.

== Achievements ==
=== Club ===
- Liga Naţională
  - Winner: 1988
- Cupa României:
  - Winner: 1987, 1988
- Nemzeti Bajnokság I
  - Winner: 1998, 1999
- Magyar Kupa:
  - Winner: 1998, 1999
- EHF Champions League:
  - Winner: 1999
- EHF Cup:
  - Winner: 1998

=== International ===
- World Championship:
  - Silver Medalist: 1995
- Olympic Games:
  - Bronze Medalist: 1996

== Individual awards ==
- Nemzeti Bajnokság I Top Scorer: 1994
- Hungarian Handballer of the Year: 1996
