= Aniko =

Aniko may refer to:

- Anikó, female given name
- Aniko or Araniko (1245–1306), a key figure in the arts of Nepal, Tibet, and Yuan China
- Aniko, stage name for Canadian singer Mary Lou Farrell (1942–2011)
