= Lelkes =

Lelkes is a surname. Notable people with the surname include:

- András Lelkes (born 1935), Hungarian gymnast
- Péter István Lelkes (born 1949), Israel-USA biophysicist and bioengineer
- Rozália Lelkes (born 1950), Hungarian handball player and coach
