= Katalin Laki =

Hungarian handball player (born 1948)

Medal record

Representing Hungary

Women's Handball

Olympic Games
Bronze medal – third place	1976 Montreal	Team

World Championship
Bronze medal – third place	1971 Netherlands	Team
Bronze medal – third place	1975 Soviet Union	Team

Katalin Laki (née Tóth Harsányi; born 2 April 1948 in Debrecen) is a former Hungarian handball player and Olympic medalist. She has been capped 121 times for the Hungarian national team between 1971 and 1976. She participated on three World Championships, winning the bronze in 1971 and 1975, followed by another bronze on the 1976 Summer Olympics in Montreal. On the Olympic tournament she played in all five matches and scored seven goals.

Her sister Borbála Tóth Harsányi was also an international handballer. They played together at the 1976 Olympics.
