= Borbála Tóth Harsányi =

Hungarian handball player (born 1946)

Personal information
- Nationality: Hungarian
- Born: 8 August 1946 (age 80) Debrecen, Hungary
- Height: 1.86 m (6 ft 1 in)

Sport
- Sport: Handball

Senior clubs
- Years: Team
- 1959–1965: Debreceni Spartacus
- –: Bakony Vegyész TC
National team
Years	Team	Apps
1967–1976	Hungary	156

Teams managed
- 1977–1979: Köfém SC
- –: Vasas SC (youth)
Medal record
Representing Hungary
Women's Handball
Olympic Games
Bronze medal – third place	1976 Montreal	Team
World Championship
Bronze medal – third place	1971 Netherlands	Team

Borbála Tóth Harsányi (born 8 August 1946 in Debrecen) is a former Hungarian handball player and Olympic medalist.

== Career ==
Harsányi's first club was Debreceni Spartacus, where she played until 1965. She then joined Bakony Vegyész TC, where she won the Hungarian Championship in 1970 and the Cup in 1973.

After her playing days she has worked as a handball coach and as a journalist.

She has a younger sister, Katalin Tóth Harsányi, who was also a Hungarian international handball player. They played together at the 1976 Olympics.

== Awards ==
- Nemzeti Bajnokság I Top Scorer: 1970
