= Irina Sirina =

Hungarian handball player (born 1967)

Personal information
- Nationality: Hungarian
- Born: 7 November 1967 (age 59) Nevinnomyssk, Russia

Sport
- Sport: Handball

Senior clubs
- Years: Team
- –: Rostselmas Rostov
- 1992–1993: ŽRK Budućnost Podgorica
- 1993–1994: Kometal Skopje
- 1994–1995: HC Tunis
- 1995–1996: Caola SE
- 1996–2000: Vasas SC
- 2000–2005: Győri Graboplast ETO KC
- 2005–2007: Dunaferr NK
National team
Years	Team	Apps	(Gls)
2003–2004	Hungary	39	(0)
Medal record
Representing Hungary
World Championship
Silver medal – second place	2003 Croatia	Team
European Championship
Bronze medal – third place	2004 Hungary	Team

Irina Sirina (born 7 November 1967) is a former Russian and Hungarian international handball player and current goalkeeping coach of Budaörs Handball. She participated at the 2004 Summer Olympics, where she placed fifth with the Hungarian national team. After her retirement in 2007, she is working as goalkeeper coach in Hungary.
