= Ibolya Mehlmann =

Hungarian handball player (born 1981)

Personal information
- Full name: Ibolya Weiszné Mehlmann
- Nationality: Hungarian
- Born: 4 November 1981 (age 44) Pécs, Hungary
- Height: 1.86 m (6 ft 1 in)

Sport
- Sport: Handball
- Position: Right Back

Senior clubs
- Years: Team
- 1999–2005: Győri ETO KC
- 2005–2006: Dunaferr
- 2006–2008: Aalborg DH
- 2010: VKLSE Győr
- 2010–2011: Veszprém Barabás KC
- 2011–2012: RK Krim Ljubljana
- 2015–2016: Hypo Niederösterreich
National team
Years	Team	Apps	(Gls)
2002–2010	Hungary	133	(349)
Medal record
Junior World Championship
Silver medal – second place	2001 Hungary
World Championship
Silver medal – second place	2003 Croatia
Bronze medal – third place	2005 Russia
European Championship
Bronze medal – third place	2004 Hungary
- Updated on 22 July 2018

Ibolya Weiszné Mehlmann (born 4 November 1981) is a former Hungarian handball player who played for the Hungarian national team.

== Career ==
Mehlmann started her professional career in Győri ETO KC, and first got into the spotlight when she proved her prolific goalscoring skills and led the Hungarian junior national team to win the silver medal on the 2001 Junior World Championship.

It gave a big boost to her career and soon became the first choice right back in her club. She debuted in the Hungarian national team as well, and was member of the World Championship silver and bronze medallist, and the European Championship bronze medallist team. She was also present on the 2004 Summer Olympics.

In the 2006 European Championship she was the top goalscorer of the Hungarian team with 37 goals and was selected for the All-Star team. In the same year she switched to Aalborg DH.

In 2008, when it was made official that Mehlmann is in delicate condition, the sides terminated the contract with immediate effect. She gave birth to a boy, Olivér, on 28 December 2008.

Mehlmann resumed training in early 2010 and joined Hungarian second division team VKLSE Győr. At the end of the season she was signed by Veszprém Barabás KC.

In August 2011, still under contract with Veszprém, Mehlmann travelled to Ljlubljana with the permission of her club to participate on a trial by RK Krim Ljubljana. She impressed the Slovenian club's staff who offered her a one-year contract, which Mehlmann accepted and moved to Krim on 16 August 2011. Her last club on professional level was Hypo Niederösterreich.

== Achievements ==
=== Club ===
- Nemzeti Bajnokság I:
  - Winner: 2005
  - Silver Medallist: 2000, 2004
  - Bronze Medallist: 2001, 2002, 2003, 2006
- Magyar Kupa:
  - Winner: 2005
- Damehåndboldligaen:
  - Bronze Medallist: 2007
- EHF Cup:
  - Finalist: 2002, 2004, 2005

=== International ===
- Junior World Championship:
  - Silver Medallist: 2001
- World Championship:
  - Silver Medallist: 2003
  - Bronze Medallist: 2005
- European Championship:
  - Bronze Medallist: 2004

== Individual awards ==
- All-Star Right Back of the European Championship: 2006
