= Orsolya Vérten =

Hungarian handball player (born 1982)

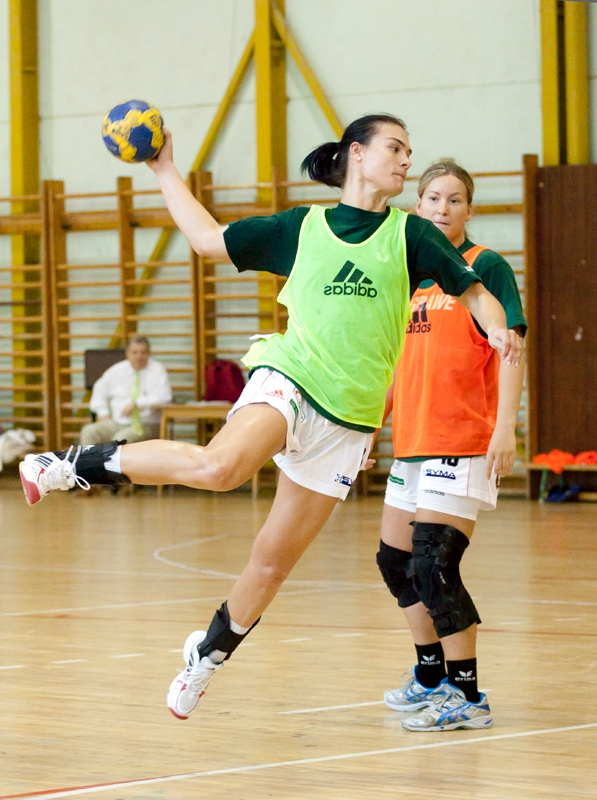
- Vérten in 2011

Personal information
- Nationality: Hungarian
- Born: 22 July 1982 (age 44) Budapest, Hungary
- Height: 1.70 m (5 ft 7 in)

Sport
- Sport: Handball
- Position: Left wing

Senior clubs
- Years: Team
- 1999–2002: Vasas SC
- 2000–2001: → Delfin KC (loan)
- 2002–2012: Győri ETO KC
- 2012–2015: Ferencvárosi TC
National team
Years	Team	Apps	(Gls)
2002–2013	Hungary	147	(418)
Medal record
World Championship
Bronze medal – third place	2005 Russia
European Championship
Bronze medal – third place	2012 Serbia
Junior World Championship
Silver medal – second place	2001 Hungary

Orsolya Vérten (born 22 July 1982) is a Hungarian retired handballer who played for the Hungarian national team.

She made her international debut in 2002 and participated in the European Championship in the same year, finishing fifth. She played in another three European Championships (2006, 2008, 2010). Vérten was also present at three World Championships between 2005 and 2009, achieving the best result on her first one, when Hungary captured the bronze medal.

She competed at the 2008 Summer Olympics in Beijing, where she finished fourth, after losing 20–22 to Russia in the semifinal, and falling short 28–33 to South Korea in the bronze medal match. Vérten was voted into the tournament's All-Star Team in left wing position.

In that year she also received the Hungarian Handballer of the Year award, given out by the Hungarian Handball Federation. Vérten was awarded the prestigious prize once again in the following year.

== Achievements ==
- Nemzeti Bajnokság I:
  - Winner: 2005, 2006, 2008, 2009, 2010, 2011, 2012, 2015
  - Silver Medalist: 2004, 2007
  - Bronze Medalist: 2002, 2003
- Magyar Kupa:
  - Winner: 2005, 2006, 2007, 2008, 2009, 2010, 2011, 2012
  - Finalist: 2002, 2004, 2015
- EHF Champions League:
  - Finalist: 2009, 2012
  - Semifinalist: 2007, 2008, 2010, 2011
- EHF Cup Winners' Cup:
  - Finalist: 2006
  - Semifinalist: 2003, 2015
- EHF Cup:
  - Finalist: 2002, 2004, 2005
- Junior World Championship:
  - Silver Medalist: 2001
- World Championship:
  - Bronze Medalist: 2005
- European Championship:
  - Bronze Medalist: 2012

== Individual awards ==
- Hungarian Handballer of the Year: 2008, 2009
- All-Star Left Wing of the Olympic Games: 2008

== Personal ==
She gave birth to her son, Magor in June 2018 and Lelle in Juli 2020 and November 2021 Zolna.
