= Ágnes Hornyák =

Hungarian handball player (born 1982)

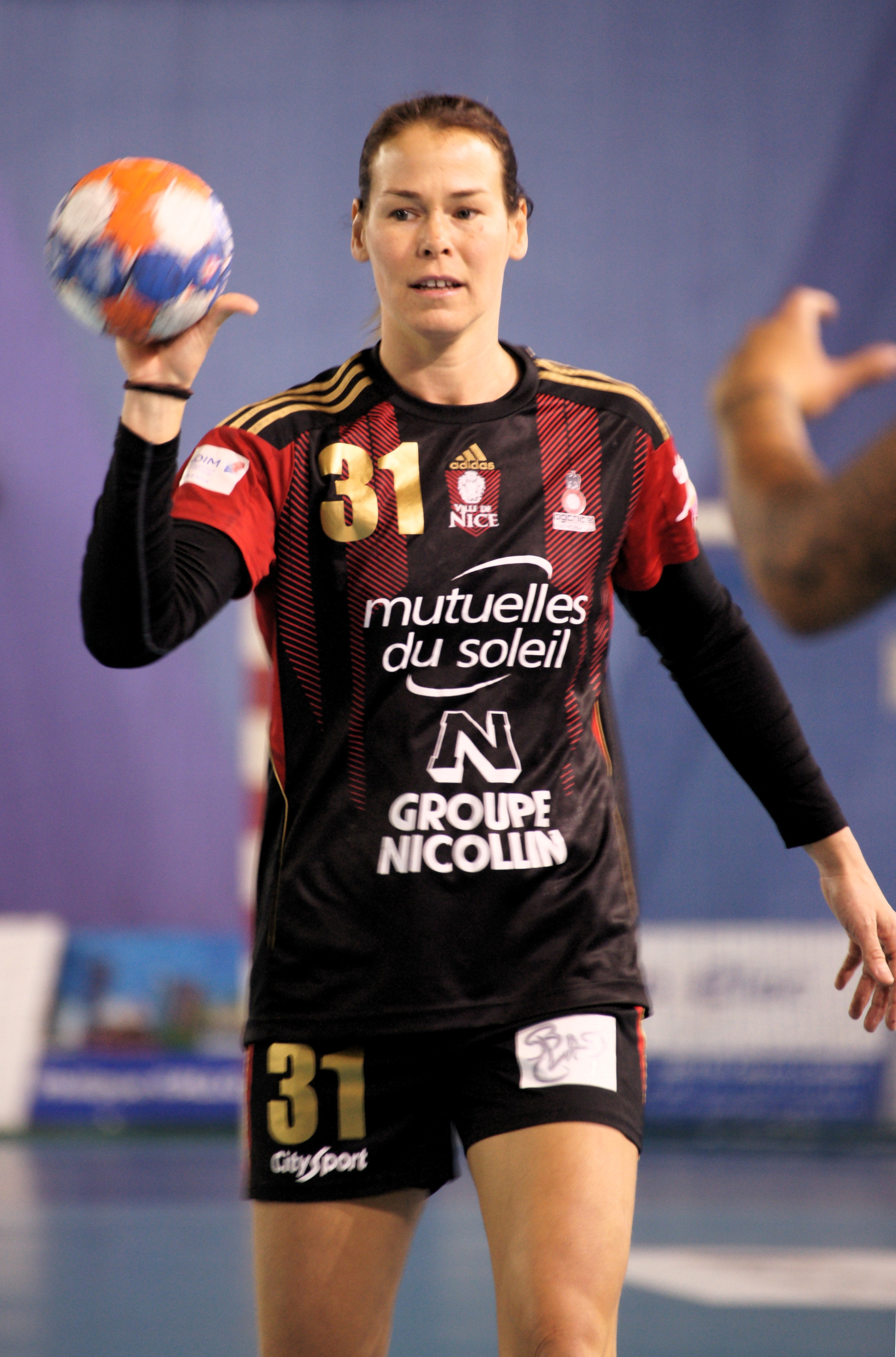

Personal information
- Full name: Ágnes Boczkó-Hornyák
- Nationality: Hungarian
- Born: 2 September 1982 (age 44) Mátészalka, Hungary
- Height: 1.80 m (5 ft 11 in)

Sport
- Sport: Handball
- Position: Right Back
- Current club: Budaörs Handball
- Number: 31

Senior clubs
- Years: Team
- –1999: Kisvárdai KC
- 1999–2002: Dunaferr
- 2002–2006: Váci NKSE
- 2006–2015: Győri ETO KC
- 2015–2016: OGN Nice
- 2016–2021: Budaörs Handball
National team
| Years | Team | Apps | (Gls) |
| 2005–2012 | Hungary | 102 | (97) |
Medal record
World Championship
| Bronze medal – third place | 2005 Russia | Team |
- Updated on 1 June 2018

Ágnes Hornyák (formerly Ágnes Boczkó-Hornyák; born 2 September 1982 in Mátészalka) is a retired Hungarian team handball player.

She mader her international debut against Norway on 2 March 2005. She participated on the World Championship yet in that year and captured a bronze medal. She took part on another World Championship in 2007, and represented Hungary on two European Championships in 2006 and 2008.

She was also a member of the team that finished fourth at the 2008 Summer Olympics in China.

She was married to world champion fencer, Gábor Boczkó. She gave birth to their son, Áron in April 2013.

== Achievements ==
- Nemzeti Bajnokság I:
  - Winner: 2008, 2009, 2010, 2011, 2012, 2013, 2014
  - Silver Medalist: 2007, 2015
- Magyar Kupa:
  - Winner: 2002, 2007, 2008, 2009, 2010, 2011, 2012, 2013, 2014, 2015
- EHF Champions League:
  - Winner: 2013, 2014
  - Finalist: 2009, 2012
  - Semifinalist: 2007, 2008, 2010, 2011
- World Championship:
  - Bronze Medalist: 2005
- World University Championship:
  - Winner: 2010
