= Andrea Farkas =

Hungarian handball player (born 1969)

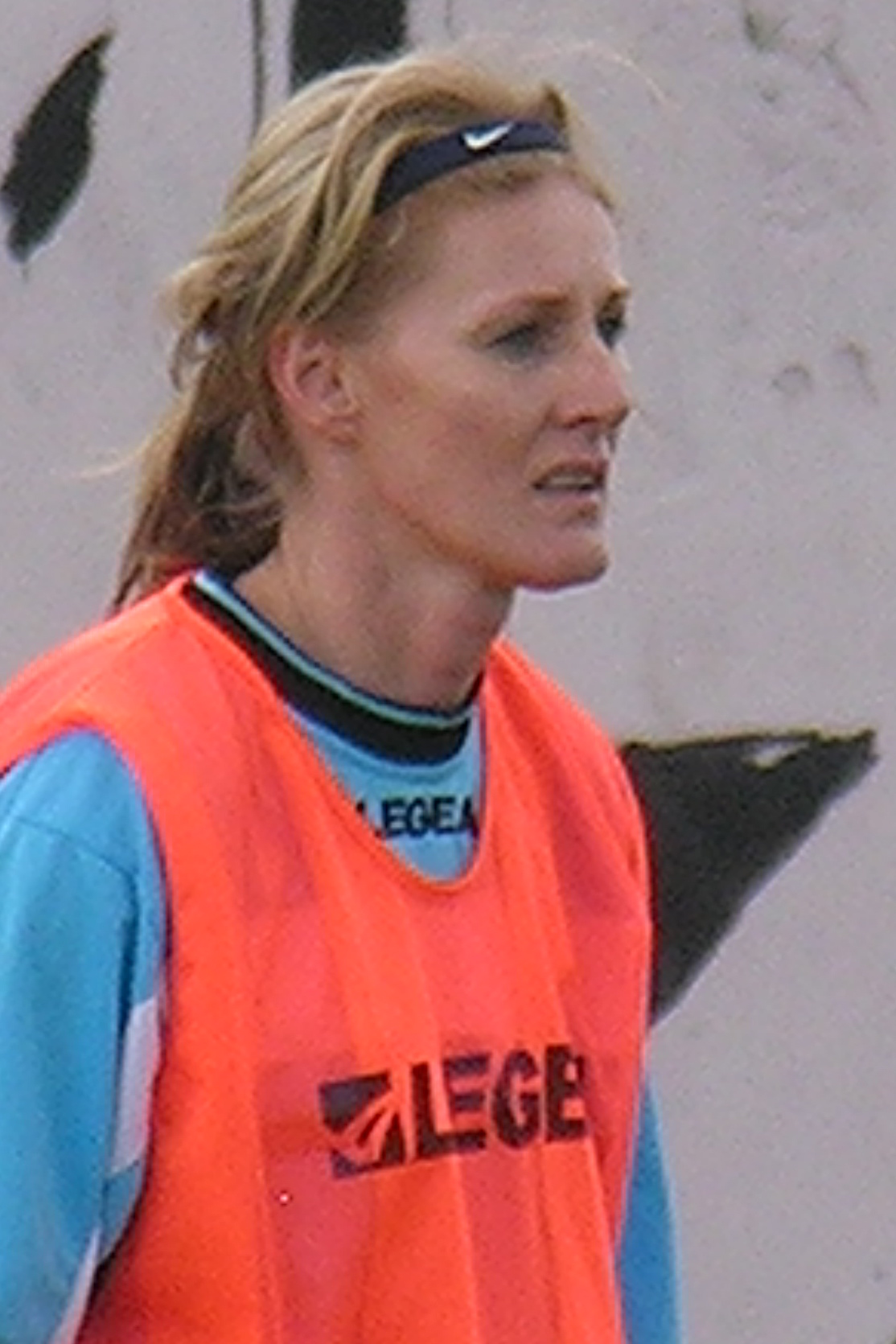

Personal information
- Full name: Andrea Farkas
- Nationality: Hungarian
- Born: 1 September 1969 (age 57) Budapest, Hungary
- Height: 1.78 m (5 ft 10 in)

Sport
- Sport: Handball
- Position: Goalkeeper
- Current club: Dunaújvárosi NKS (goalkeeping coach)

Senior clubs
- Years: Team
- –1989: Lőrinci Fonó
- 1989–1993: Budapesti Spartacus SC
- 1993–1997: Ferencvárosi TC
- 1997–2000: Dunaferr SE
- 2000–2002: Metz Handball
- 2002–2003: Alcoa FKC
- 2003–2004: Vasas SC
- 2004–2005: RK Krim Ljubljana
- 2006: Győri ETO KC
- 2010: Roude Léiw Bascharage
National team
Years	Team	Apps
1993–2001	Hungary	131
Medal record
Olympic Games
Silver medal – second place	2000 Sydney	Team
Bronze medal – third place	1996 Atlanta	Team
World Championship
Silver medal – second place	1995 Austria / Hungary	Team
European Championship
Bronze medal – third place	1998 Netherlands	Team
Association football career
- Position: Goalkeeper
Senior career*
Years	Team	Apps	(Gls)
2012	Astra Hungary	3	(0)
- * Club domestic league appearances and goals

Andrea Farkas (born 1 September 1969) is a former Hungarian international team handball goalkeeper who currently works as goalkeeping coach for Dunaújvárosi NKS. Among her achievements with the national team is an Olympic bronze medal from 1996 and an Olympic silver medal from 2000. As a club player her career includes victory in the EHF Champions League, as well as several national championships.

== Career ==
Farkas debuted in the Hungarian national team in 1993 and played on her first major tournament two years later, winning the silver medal on the World Championship. This was followed by two bronze medals at the 1996 Summer Olympics in Atlanta and the 1998 European Championship in the Netherlands. She crowned her international career with a silver medal at the 2000 Summer Olympics in Sydney.

At club level, Farkas achieved her best results with Ferencvárosi TC and Dunaferr SE, winning a combined six Hungarian championship and seven Hungarian cup titles. She was also member of the Dunaferr golden team that won both the EHF Cup and the EHF Championship League in 1998 and 1999, respectively.

Later she moved abroad to play for French side Metz Handball (2000–2002) and Slovenian top club RK Krim Ljubljana (2004–2005). Following her spell at Krim, Farkas gave up professional handball and joined Vasas SC as goalkeeping coach. However, after a serious knee ligament injury of Győri ETO KC's first choice goalkeeper Orsolya Herr just before the 2006 EHF Cup Winners' Cup finals, she was reactivated and signed by the Western Hungarian team for the decisive two matches. Győr eventually lost the duel with an aggregate score of 51–48 and Farkas resumed to her coaching duties.

During her time at Vasas, Farkas coached among others Žaneta Tóthová, who became the best sportswoman in Slovakia during this period, and Ágnes Triffa, who was given the Hungarian Junior Handball of the Year award in 2005 and made her full international debut in 2006. Farkas later had spells at Százhalombattai KE and Hort SE, and also worked for the Hungarian national team in younger age categories.

Somewhat of a surprise, in January 2010, the then-40-year-old goalkeeper have decided to return to the field and signed a short-term deal with Luxembourgian club Roude Léiw Bascharage until the end of the season.

Since 2011 she serves as the goalkeeping coach of Dunaújvárosi NKS and also works with youngsters on the club's newly founded handball academy.

== Achievements ==
- Nemzeti Bajnokság I:
  - Winner: 1994, 1995, 1996, 1997, 1998, 1999
- Magyar Kupa:
  - Winner: 1994, 1995, 1996, 1997, 1998, 1999, 2000
- French Championship:
  - Winner: 2002
- Slovenian Championship:
  - Winner: 2005
- Slovenian Cup:
  - Winner: 2005
- EHF Champions League:
  - Winner: 1999
- EHF Cup:
  - Winner: 1998
- EHF Cup Winners' Cup:
  - Finalist: 1994, 2006
- EHF Champions Trophy:
  - Winner: 1999

== Awards and recognition ==
- Silver Cross of the Order of Merit of the Republic of Hungary: 1999
- Knight's Cross of the Order of Merit of the Republic of Hungary:2000
