= Tímea Tóth =

Hungarian handball player (born 1980)

Personal information
- Full name: Tímea Tóth
- Nationality: Hungarian
- Born: 16 September 1980 (age 46) Zalaszentgrót, Hungary
- Height: 1.82 m (6 ft 0 in)

Sport
- Sport: Handball
- Position: Left Back

Senior clubs
- Years: Team
- 1995–1997: (Hungary) Zalaegerszegi Caola
- 1997–1999: (Hungary) Ferencvárosi TC
- 1999–2000: (Hungary) Váci NKSE
- 2000–2007: (Hungary) Ferencvárosi TC
- 2007–2009: (Austria) Hypo Niederösterreich
- 2009–2010: (Hungary) Váci NKSE
- 2010–2013: (Hungary) Érdi VSE
National team
Years	Team	Apps	(Gls)
2002–2010	Hungary	155	(488)
Medal record
World Championship
Silver medal – second place	2003 Croatia	Team
Bronze medal – third place	2005 Russia	Team
European Championship
Bronze medal – third place	2004 Hungary	Team
- Updated on 22 July 2018

Tímea Tóth (born 16 September 1980) is a former Hungarian handballer who most recently played for Érdi VSE and the Hungarian national team.

== Achievements ==
- Nemzeti Bajnokság I:
  - Winner: 2002, 2007
  - Silver Medalist: 2001, 2003, 2006
  - Bronze Medalist: 2004, 2005
- Magyar Kupa:
  - Winner: 2001, 2003
  - Silver Medalist: 2007
- Austrian Championship:
  - Winner: 2008, 2009
- ÖHB Cup:
  - Winner: 2008, 2009
- EHF Champions League:
  - Finalist: 2002, 2008
  - Semifinalist: 2001, 2009
- EHF Cup:
  - Winner: 2006
  - Semifinalist: 2005
- EHF Cup Winners' Cup:
  - Semifinalist: 2007
- EHF Champions Trophy:
  - Finalist: 2008
  - Fourth Placed: 2006
- World Championship:
  - Silver Medalist: 2003
  - Bronze Medalist: 2005
- European Championship:
  - Bronze Medalist: 2004

== Individual awards ==
- EHF Champions League Top Scorer: 2008
- Nemzeti Bajnokság I Top Scorer: 2010, 2011

== Personal life ==
Her partner is László Tico Kozma. She gave birth to their son in 2019, who was a premature baby and lived only 12 days. In April 2021 she has been diagnosed with breast cancer.

Awards
Preceded by (Serbia) Bojana Popović	EHF Champions League top scorer 2007–08	Succeeded by (Germany) Grit Jurack
