= Klára Szekeres =

Hungarian handball player (born 1987)

Klára Csiszár-Szekeres
Personal information
- Full name: Klára Csiszár-Szekeres
- Nationality: Hungarian
- Born: 1 December 1987 (age 38) Békéscsaba, Hungary
- Height: 1.86 m (6 ft 1 in)

Sport
- Sport: Handball
- Position: Left back
- Current club: Érd NK
- Number: 4

Senior clubs
- Years: Team
- 2004–2011: Békéscsabai Előre NKSE
- 2011–2015: Érd NK
- 2015–2022: Ferencvárosi TC
- 2022–2023: Érd NK
National team
Years	Team	Apps	(Gls)
2009–2021	Hungary	104	(33)
Medal record
European Championship
Bronze medal – third place	2012 Serbia

Klára Csiszár-Szekeres (born 1 December 1987) is a Hungarian handballer for Érd NK and the Hungarian national team.

She debuted in the national team on 19 November 2009 against the Netherlands. A month later she played at the 2009 World Women's Handball Championship, where Hungary finished 9th.

== International honours ==
- European Championship:
  - Bronze Medalist: 2012
