= Zsuzsanna Lovász =

Hungarian handball player (born 1976)

Personal information
- Full name: Zsuzsanna Lovász-Pavlik
- Nationality: Hungarian
- Born: 17 December 1976 (age 49) Budapest, Hungary
- Height: 1.73 m (5 ft 8 in)

Sport
- Sport: Handball
- Position: Right Wing
- Current club: —

Senior clubs
- Years: Team
- –1999: Vasas SC
- 1999–2000: Köfém SC
- 2000–2003: Győri ETO KC
- 2003–2008: Dunaújváros
- 2008–2009: Hódmezővásárhelyi NKC
National team
Years	Team	Apps	(Gls)
2000–2008	Hungary	80	(231)
Medal record
World Championship
Silver medal – second place	2003 Croatia	Team
European Championship
Bronze medal – third place	2004 Hungary	Team

Zsuzsanna Lovász (formerly Zsuzsanna Pavlikné Lovász; born 17 December 1976) is a retired Hungarian handball player. She participated at the 2004 Summer Olympics, where she placed fifth with the Hungarian national team.

== Personal life ==
Her husband is János Dénes, Hungarian handballer. Their daughter Panna, was born in 2012.

== Achievements ==
- Nemzeti Bajnokság I:
  - Winner: 2004
  - Silver Medalist: 2005, 2008
  - Bronze Medalist: 2001, 2002, 2003, 2006, 2007
- Magyar Kupa:
  - Winner: 2004
  - Silver Medalist: 2008
  - Bronze Medalist: 2007
- EHF Cup:
  - Finalist: 2002
- World Championship:
  - Silver Medalist: 2003
- European Championship:
  - Bronze Medalist: 2004
