= Beáta Bohus =

Hungarian handball player (born 1971)

Personal information
- Full name: Beáta Bohus
- Nationality: Hungarian
- Born: 25 April 1971 (age 55) Békéscsaba, Hungary
- Height: 1.72 m (5 ft 8 in)

Sport
- Sport: Handball
- Position: Line Player
- Current club: Retired

Senior clubs
- Years: Team
- –1997: Békéscsabai ENKSE
- 1997–2005: Dunaferr
- 2009–2011: Csorvási SK
National team
Years	Team	Apps	(Gls)
1992–2004	Hungary	69	(47)

Teams managed
- 2005–2010: Békéscsabai ENKSE (asst. coach)
- 2010–2011: Békéscsabai ENKSE (head coach)
- 2013–present: Youth national handball team
Medal record
World Championship
Silver medal – second place	2003 Croatia	Team
European Championship
Bronze medal – third place	2004 Hungary	Team

Beáta Bohus (born 25 April 1971 in Békéscsaba) is a former Hungarian handball player and handball coach. Currently she is the head coach of the Hungarian women's national youth handball team.

== Playing career ==
=== Club ===
Bohus started to play professional handball for her hometown club Békéscsabai Előre NKSE. During her spell at the Purples, she has won a bronze medal yet in 1992. The talented line player signed to the strengthening Dunaferr in 1997 and thus become part of one of the most successful teams in the handball history. With the Dunaújváros-based team she has won the EHF Cup in 1998, the EHF Champions League in 1999 and also collected the EHF Champions Trophy in that year. In additionm she has won five Hungarian championship and as many Hungarian Cup titles. In her later years she had to compete with world-class pivot Anita Kulcsár for a first team place, and it resulted less playing minutes for her. She retired from handball in 2005, however, Hungarian second division team Csorvási SK reactivated her in 2009. She played two seasons for the club.

=== International ===
Bohus made her international debut on 30 October 1992 against France, but surprisingly she was not selected for any major tournament until 2003. That year she participated on the World Championship, where Hungary finished second. One year later she participated at the 2004 Summer Olympics, where she placed fifth with the national team. Later that year, she was also present on the European Championship and collected the bronze medal. Bohus has retired from international handball after the competition.

== Coaching career ==
After her retirement in 2005, Békéscsaba have immediately offered her an assistant coach position. In November 2010 she was named as head coach instead of Eszter Mátéfi, in order to help the Hungarian national team coach to concentrate fully on her duties. Bohus remained in her position until October 2011, when she was replaced by Péter Kovács. Since 2013 she is the head coach of the Hungarian women's national youth handball team.

== Achievements ==
=== Player ===
- Nemzeti Bajnokság I:
  - Winner: 1998, 1999, 2001, 2003, 2004
  - Bronze Medallist: 1992, 2000
- Magyar Kupa:
  - Winner: 1998, 1999, 2000, 2002, 2004
- EHF Champions League:
  - Winner: 1999
  - Semifinalist: 2004, 2005
- EHF Cup:
  - Winner: 1998
  - Finalist: 2003
- EHF Champions Trophy:
  - Winner: 1999
  - Third Placed: 1998
- World Championship:
  - Silver Medallist: 2003
- European Championship:
  - Bronze Medallist: 2004

=== Coach ===
Hungary women's national youth handball team

- IHF Women's Youth World Championship:
  - Finalist: 2018
- European Youth Olympic Festival:
  - Winner: 2017
- Youth European Championship:
  - Bronze medalist: 2017
