= Krisztina Pigniczki =

Hungarian handball player (born 1975)

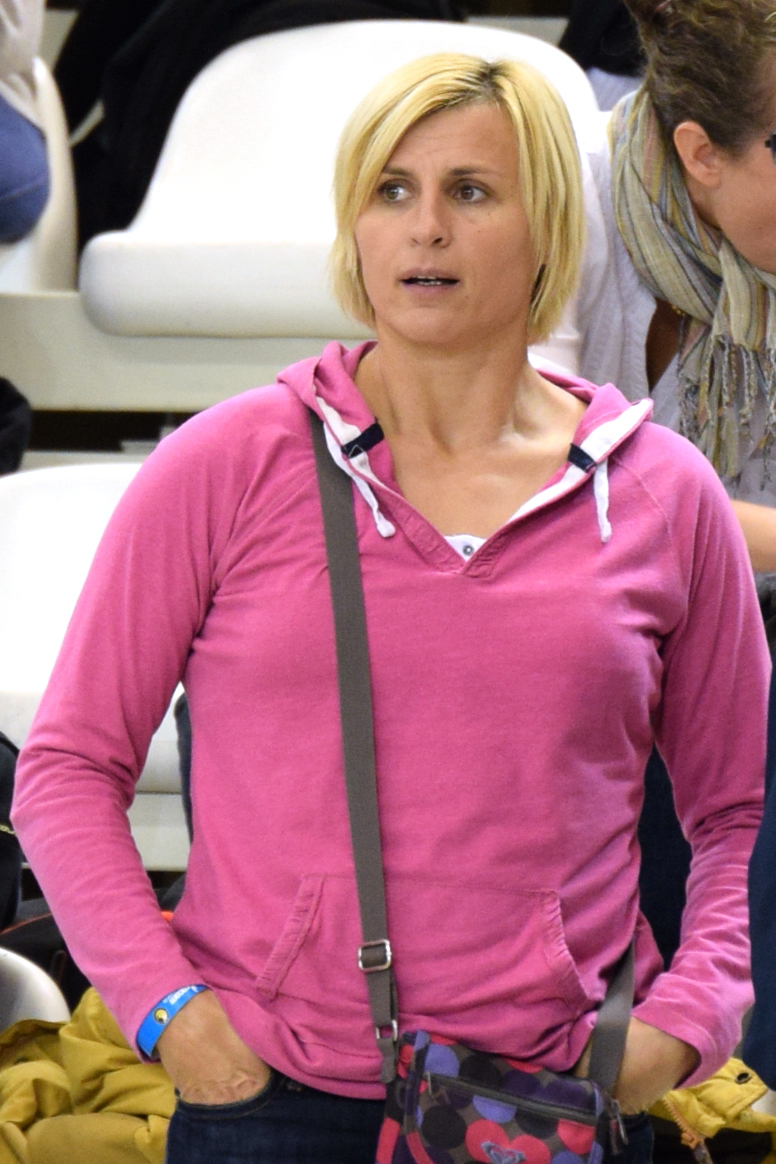
- Pigniczki in 2014

Personal information
- Full name: Krisztina Pigniczki
- Nationality: Hungarian
- Born: 18 September 1975 (age 51) Makó, Hungary
- Height: 1.71 m (5 ft 7 in)

Sport
- Sport: Handball
- Position: Middle Back

Senior clubs
- Years: Team
- –1993: Szegedi ESK
- 1993–2001: Győri ETO KC
- 2001–2008: Dunaújváros
- 2008–2011: Issy-Paris Hand
National team
Years	Team	Apps	(Gls)
1998–2008	Hungary	157	(232)

Teams managed
- 2021–: Hungary (assistant coach)
Medal record
Olympic Games
Silver medal – second place	2000 Sydney	Team
World Championship
Silver medal – second place	2003 Croatia
European Championship
Gold medal – first place	2000 Romania
Bronze medal – third place	1998 Netherlands
Bronze medal – third place	2004 Hungary
- Updated on 22 July 2018

Krisztina Pigniczki (born 18 September 1975) is a Hungarian former handball player and Olympic medalist. She received a silver medal at the 2000 Summer Olympics in Sydney, and a silver medal at the 2003 World Women's Handball Championship in Croatia. She became European champion in 2000 with the Hungarian national team, and received a bronze medal in 1998 and in 2004.

== Achievements ==
- Nemzeti Bajnokság I:
  - Winner: 2003, 2004
  - Silver Medalist: 2002, 2005, 2008
  - Bronze Medalist: 1998, 1999, 2000, 2001, 2007
- Magyar Kupa:
  - Winner: 2002, 2004
  - Silver Medalist: 2008
- Olympic Games:
  - Silver Medalist: 2000
- World championship:
  - Silver Medalist: 2003
- European championship:
  - Winner: 2000
  - Bronze Medalist: 1998, 2001
