= Beatrix Tóth =

Hungarian handball player (born 1967)

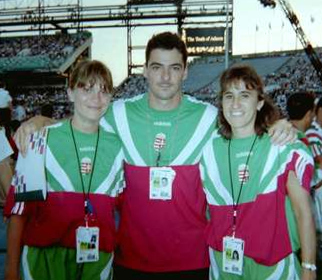

Personal information
- Born: 10 March 1967 (age 59) Szabadszállás, Hungary

Sport
- Sport: Handball
- Position: Right back
- Current club: Retired

Senior clubs
- Years: Team
- –: Dunavecse
- 1992–1999: Ferencvárosi TC
National team
- Years: Team
- 1993–1996: Hungary
Medal record
Women's handball
Representing Hungary
Olympic Games
Bronze medal – third place	1996 Atlanta	Team
World Championship
Silver medal – second place	1995 Austria/Hungary	Team

Beatrix Tóth (born 10 March 1967) is a retired Hungarian handball player. She won a silver medal at the 1995 World Championships and a bronze at the 1996 Olympics.
