= Rea Mészáros =

Hungarian handball player (born 1994)

Personal information
- Full name: Rea Réka Mészáros
- Nationality: Hungarian
- Born: 14 April 1994 (age 32) Vác, Hungary
- Height: 1.72 m (5 ft 8 in)

Sport
- Sport: Handball
- Position: Pivot
- Current club: Retired
- Number: 14
National team
Years	Team	Apps	(Gls)
2014–2018	Hungary	51	(12)
Medal record
Junior European Championship
Silver medal – second place	2013 Denmark
- Updated on 3 August 2020

Rea Réka Mészáros (born 14 April 1994) is a retired Hungarian handball player who most recently played for Váci NKSE and the Hungarian national team.

== Achievements ==
- Nemzeti Bajnokság I:
  - Winner: 2015
  - Finalist: 2016, 2017, 2018
- Magyar Kupa:
  - Winner: 2017
