= Beatrix Balogh =

Hungarian handball player (born 1974)

Personal information
- Full name: Beatrix Csatáné Balogh
- Nationality: Hungarian
- Born: 12 December 1974 (age 51) Kaposvár, Hungary
- Height: 1.65 m (5 ft 5 in)

Sport
- Sport: Handball
- Position: Right Wing

Senior clubs
- Years: Team
- –: Csurgói KSK
- –: Testnevelési Főiskola SE
- –: Pécsi MKC
- 1995–2001: Dunaújváros
- 2001–2004: Hypo Niederösterreich
- 2004–2008: Alcoa FKC
- 2008–2009: BM Sagunto
- 2009–2011: Dunaújváros
- 2011–2016: Marcali VSZSE
- 2016–: Egerszegi KK
National team
Years	Team	Apps	(Gls)
1994–2007	Hungary	170	(503)

Teams managed
- 2011–2016: Marcali VSZSE
- 2016–2023: Egerszegi KK
- 2023-: TSV EBE Forst United
Medal record
Olympic Games
Silver medal – second place	2000 Sydney	Team
World Championship
Bronze medal – third place	2005 Russia
European Championship
Gold medal – first place	2000 Romania
Bronze medal – third place	1998 Netherlands
Bronze medal – third place	2004 Hungary

Beatrix Csatáné Balogh (born 12 December 1974) is a retired Hungarian handball player, European champion and Olympic silver medalist. She retired from professional handball in 2011. Between 2011 and 2016, Balogh was the player-coach of Marcali VSZSE. Since 2016, she is the player-coach of Egerszegi KK.

Balogh debuted in the Hungarian national team on 5 March 1994 against Iceland, and participated in her first European Championship the same year, finishing fourth. She took part on another five continental events (1996, 1998, 2002, 2004, 2006), winning the 2000 edition.

Balogh participated in five World Championships as well (1997, 1999, 2001, 2005, 2007), achieving a bronze medal in 2005. In addition, she received a silver medal at the 2000 Summer Olympics in Sydney.

== Achievements ==
=== Club ===
- Nemzeti Bajnokság I:
  - Winner: 1998, 1999, 2001
- Magyar Kupa:
  - Winner: 1998, 1999
- Women Handball Austria:
  - Winner: 2002, 2003, 2004
- ÖHB Cup:
  - Winner: 2002, 2003, 2004
- EHF Champions League:
  - Winner: 1999
- EHF Cup:
  - Winner: 1998, 2005
- EHF Champions Trophy:
  - Winner: 1999

=== National team ===
- Olympic Games:
  - Silver Medalist: 2000
- World Championship:
  - Bronze Medalist: 2005
- European Championship:
  - Winner: 2000
  - Bronze Medalist: 1998, 2004

== Awards and recognition ==
- Hungarian Handballer of the Year: 1997
- All-Star Right Wing of the World Championship: 2001
- Nemzeti Bajnokság I Top Scorer: 2006
- Knight's Cross of the Order of Merit of the Republic of Hungary:2000
