= Mariann Rácz =

Hungarian-Austrian handball player (born 1959)

Personal information
- Full name: Mariann Rácz
- Nationality: Hungarian; Austrian
- Born: 17 December 1959 (age 66) Nyíregyháza, Hungary

Sport
- Sport: Handball
- Position: Goalkeeper

Senior clubs
- Years: Team
- 1979–1988: (Hungary) Vasas SC
- 1988–1996: (Austria) Hypo Niederösterreich
National team
Years	Team	Apps	(Gls)
1979–1989	Hungary	197	(3)
1989–1996	Austria	113	(0)

Teams managed
- –: Hungary (goalkeeping coach)
- 2003–2007: (Hungary) Cornexi Alcoa (goalkeeping coach)
- 2010–2020: (Hungary) Érd HC (goalkeeping coach)
Medal record
Representing Hungary
World Championship
Silver medal – second place	1982 Hungary

Mariann Rácz (born 17 December 1959) is a former Hungarian-Austrian handball player. She won a silver medal with Hungary at the 1982 World Championship.

She competed at the 1992 Summer Olympics, where Austria placed 5th.

From 2010 to 2020, she was the goalkeeping coach at Érd HC.

== Achievements ==
- EHF Champions League:
  - Winner (7): 1982, 1989, 1990, 1992, 1993, 1994, 1995
- Nemzeti Bajnokság I:
  - Winner (6): 1979, 1980, 1981, 1982, 1984, 1985
- Magyar Kupa:
  - Winner (4): 1981, 1982, 1983, 1985
- Handball Liga Austria:
  - Winner (8): 1989, 1990, 1991, 1992, 1993, 1994, 1995, 1996
- ÖHB Cup:
  - Winner (7): 1990, 1991, 1992, 1993, 1994, 1995, 1996

== Individual awards ==
- All-Star Team Best Goalkeeper of the Summer Olympics: 1992

== Personal life ==
Her nephew is Ákos Kecskés, a Hungarian national football player.
