= Beáta Siti =

Hungarian handball player (born 1973)

Personal information
- Full name: Beáta Siti
- Nationality: Hungarian
- Born: 23 September 1973 (age 53) Nagykanizsa, Hungary
- Height: 174 cm (69 in)

Sport
- Sport: Handball
- Position: Playmaker
- Current club: NEKA (coach)

Senior clubs
- Years: Team
- –1992: Nagykanizsai Olajbányász SE
- 1992–2000: Dunaferr SE
- 2000–2002: Ikast Bording EH
- 2002–2006: Alcoa FKC
National team
Years	Team	Apps	(Gls)
1994–2004	Hungary	135	(264)
Medal record
Representing Hungary
Women's handball
Olympic Games
Silver medal – second place	2000 Sydney	Team
Bronze medal – third place	1996 Atlanta	Team
World Championship
Silver medal – second place	1995 Austria / Hungary
European Championship
Gold medal – first place	2000 Romania
Bronze medal – third place	1998 Netherlands

Beáta Siti (born 23 September 1973) is a Hungarian former handball player, and later coach. During her active career she was European champion and silver medalist from both World Championships and the Olympic Games. Her biggest success with the national team was in 2000, when she obtained the gold medal at the European Championship.

== Career ==
As a club player Siti has won all major continental trophies, including three EHF Cup, an EHF Cup Winners' Cup and an EHF Champions League title. Siti made her international debut on 25 November 1994 against Macedonia, and her first major tournament was the 1995 World Women's Handball Championship, where the Hungarian team won the silver medals after falling short against South Korea in the final. At the 1996 Summer Olympics in Atlanta she won a bronze medal with the Hungarian team, after losing for South Korea in the semi-final, and winning the bronze final against Norway. In 1996 she also competed at the European Championships. At the 1998 European Women's Handball Championship in the Netherlands, she won a bronze medal with the Hungarian team. She participated at the 1999 World Championship where Hungary placed fifth. In the 2000 season she won a silver medal at the Summer Olympics in Sydney, after playing the final against Denmark. She competed at the 2000 European Women's Handball Championship, where the Hungarian team won gold medals ahead of Ukraine and Russia.

She was forced to retire in 2006 after a knee ligament injury, following that she took the technical director position of Alcoa FKC. Since 2011 beside her club duties she also works as the assistant coach of the Hungarian women's national team.

== Personal life ==
She has a younger sister, Eszter Siti, who is also a former Hungarian international handball player and European champion.

== Awards and recognition ==
- Hungarian Handballer of the Year: 1998, 1999

== Achievements ==
=== Club ===
- Nemzeti Bajnokság I:
  - Winner: 1998, 1999
- Magyar Kupa:
  - Winner: 1998, 1999, 2000
- EHF Champions League:
  - Winner: 1999
- EHF Cup Winners' Cup:
  - Winner: 1995
- EHF Cup:
  - Winner: 1998, 2002, 2005
- EHF Champions Trophy:
  - Winner: 1999

=== National team ===
- Olympic Games:
  - Silver Medalist: 2000
  - Bronze Medalist: 1996
- World Championship:
  - Silver Medalist: 1995
- European Championship:
  - Winner: 2000
  - Bronze Medalist: 1998
