= Bódog Török =

Hungarian handball player and coach (1923–2012)

Bódog Török (2 November 1923 – 16 October 2012 in Budapest) was a Hungarian handball player, coach and sports official. He was the longest serving and the most successful coach in the history of the Hungarian women's national team.

Török was born and died in Budapest. He began his playing career with Dunai Repülőgépgyár in 1943. In 1945, he switched to MÁV Északi Főműhely and a year later to Rendőrség. From 1947 until his retirement in 1965 he played for Kistext.

Beside playing, he also took the head coaching position of the Hungarian women's national team. He led Hungary on nine major tournaments between 1956 and 1978 and won a medal on seven occasions. First, yet with the field handball team, he obtained the bronze medal on the 1956 World Championship held in West Germany. In the next year, Hungary finished runners-up in the first official team handball World Championship.

In 1962, they experienced a setback, finishing only fifth in the World Championship. However, they bounced back at the next tournament in 1965, where Hungary went undefeated to win their first, and so far only, World title. This was followed by a long bronze-era, as Hungary ended up in the third position in three World Championships (1971, 1975, 1978) and on the Olympics in 1976. They only missed out the podium finish on the 1973 World Championship, where the Soviet Union proved to be too strong for Hungary in the bronze final. Török led the national team in a total of 307 matches.

From 1979 to 1987, he was a member of the Board of Hungarian Handball Federation, and between 1983 and 1987 he was the editor of Kézilabdázás, a specialist handball journal.
