= Gabriella Tóth (handballer) =

Hungarian handball player (born 1996)

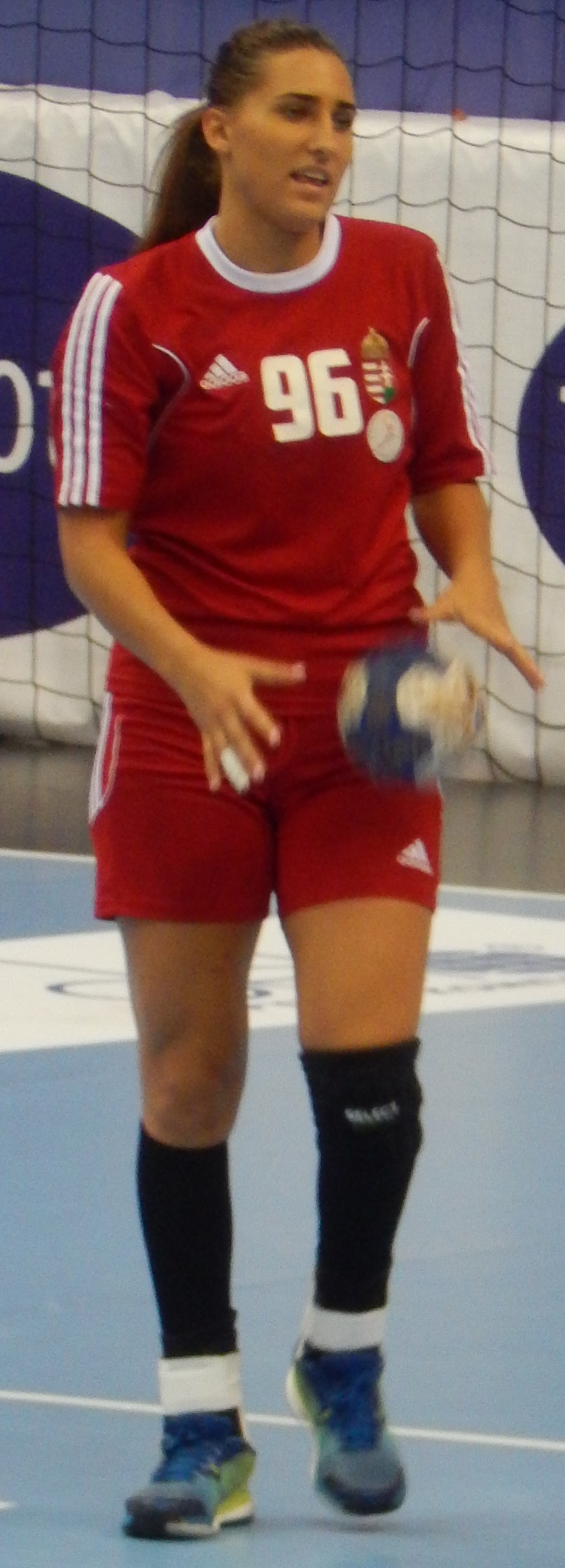
- Tóth (2016)

Personal information
- Nationality: Hungarian
- Born: 23 September 1996 (age 30) Berettyóújfalu, Hungary
- Height: 1.74 m (5 ft 9 in)

Sport
- Sport: Handball
- Position: Centre back
- Current club: Mosonmagyaróvári KC SE
- Number: 96

Senior clubs
- Years: Team
- 2008-2009: Berettyó MSE
- 2009-2012: Győri ETO KC
- 2012-2014: Veszprém Barabás KC
- 2015-2019: Győri ETO KC
- 2017: Kisvárdai KC
- 2017-2020: Érdi VSE
- 2020-2021: Siófok KC
- 2021-: Mosonmagyaróvári KC SE
National team
Years	Team	Apps	(Gls)
2014–	Hungary	49	(94)
Medal record
Junior European Championship
Silver medal – second place	2013 Denmark
- Updated on 5 August 2021

Gabriella Tóth (born 23 September 1996) is a Hungarian handball player for Mosonmagyaróvári KC SE and the Hungarian national team.

== Achievements ==
- EHF Champions League:
  - Finalist: 2016
- Nemzeti Bajnokság I
  - Gold Medalist: 2016
- Magyar Kupa
  - Gold Medalist: 2016
