= Mária Vadász =

Hungarian handball player (1950-2009)

Personal information
- Full name: Mária Vadász
- Nationality: Hungarian
- Born: 1 January 1950 Környe, Hungary
- Died: 18 August 2009 (aged 59) Budapest
- Height: 1.66 m (5 ft 5 in)

Sport
- Sport: Handball
- Position: Playmaker, Winger

Senior clubs
- Years: Team
- 1968–1971: MTK
- 1971–1984: Vasas SC
- 1984–1986: EMG SK
National team
Years	Team	Apps
1970–1983	Hungary	244
Medal record
Olympic Games
Bronze medal – third place	1976 Montreal	Team
World Championship
Silver medal – second place	1982 Hungary	Team
Bronze medal – third place	1975 Soviet Union	Team
Bronze medal – third place	1978 Czechoslovakia	Team

Mária Vadász, née Vanya (1 January 1950 – 18 August 2009) was a Hungarian handball player, Olympic bronze medalist and World Championship silver medalist.

She died in Budapest on 18 August 2009 at the age of 59.

== Achievements ==
- Nemzeti Bajnokság I:
  - Winner: 1972, 1973, 1974, 1975, 1976, 1977, 1978, 1979, 1980, 1982, 1984
- Magyar Kupa:
  - Winner: 1971, 1974, 1976, 1978, 1979, 1980, 1982
- Champions Cup:
  - Winner: 1982
  - Finalist: 1978, 1979
- Olympic Games:
  - Bronze Medalist: 1976
- World Championship:
  - Silver Medalist: 1982
  - Bronze Medalist: 1975, 1978

== Awards ==
- Hungarian Handballer of the Year: 1977
