= Bernadett Temes =

Hungarian handball player (born 1986)

Personal information
- Full name: Bernadett Temes
- Nationality: Hungarian
- Born: 15 May 1986 (age 40) Győr, Hungary
- Height: 1.77 m (5 ft 10 in)

Sport
- Sport: Handball
- Position: Middle Back, Playmaker

Senior clubs
- Years: Team
- –2007: Győri ETO KC
- 2007–2008: Debreceni VSC
- 2008–2009: Dunaújvárosi KKA
- 2009–2011: Váci NKSE
- 2011–2014: Hypo Niederösterreich
- 2014-2016: TuS Metzingen
- 2016-2017: Váci NKSE
- 2017–2021: Alba Fehérvár KC
National team
Years	Team	Apps	(Gls)
2007–2014	Hungary	28	(22)
- Updated on 22 July 2018

Bernadett Temes (born 15 May 1986 in Győr) is a Hungarian former handballer playing for Alba Fehérvár KC and the Hungarian national team as a playmaker.

She made her international debut on 28 February 2007 against Norway.

== Achievements ==
- Nemzeti Bajnokság I:
  - Winner: 2005, 2006
  - Silver Medallist: 2004, 2007
  - Bronze Medallist: 2003, 2010
- Magyar Kupa:
  - Bronze Medallist: 2008
- Women's EHF Cup Winners' Cup:
  - Winner: 2013
- Women's EHF Cup:
  - Finalist: 2016
- World University Championship:
  - Winner: 2010
