= Gabriella Kindl =

Hungarian handball player (born 1979)

Gabriella Kindl Markoč
Personal information
- Full name: Gabriella Kindl Markoč
- Nationality: Hungarian, Montenegrin
- Born: 15 September 1979 (age 47) Mohács, Hungary
- Height: 1.86 m (6 ft 1 in)

Sport
- Sport: Handball
- Position: Left back

Senior clubs
- Years: Team
- 1999–2003: Győri ETO KC
- 2003–2006: Dunaferr SE
- 2006–2008: RK Krim
- 2008–2011: ŽRK Budućnost Podgorica
National team
Years	Team	Apps	(Gls)
2000–2005	Hungary	86	(91)
2009–2011	Montenegro		
Medal record
World Championship
Bronze medal – third place	2005 Russia	Team
European Championship
Gold medal – first place	2000 Romania	Team
Bronze medal – third place	2004 Hungary	Team

Gabriella Markoč, née Kindl (Hungarian: [ˈɡɒbriɛllɒ ˈkindl̩]; born 15 September 1979) is a retired Hungarian and Montenegrin handball player.

== Achievements ==
- Nemzeti Bajnokság I:
  - Winner: 2003, 2004
- Magyar Kupa:
  - Winner: 2004
- Slovenian Championship:
  - Winner: 2007, 2008
- Slovenian Cup:
  - Winner: 2007, 2008
- Montenegrin Championship:
  - Winner: 2009, 2010, 2011
- Montenegrin Cup:
  - Winner: 2009, 2010, 2011
- EHF Cup Winners' Cup:
  - Winner: 2010
- EHF Cup:
  - Finalist: 1999, 2002, 2003
- World Championship:
  - Bronze medalist: 2005
- European Championship:
  - Winner: 2000
  - Bronze medalist: 2004
