= Judit Simics =

Hungarian handball player (born 1967)

Personal information
- Born: 28 September 1967 (age 59) Mohács, Hungary
- Height: 177 cm (70 in)

Sport
- Sport: Handball
- Position: Left back
- Current club: Retired

Youth career
- Years: Team
- –: Csurgó

Senior clubs
- Years: Team
- –: TFSE
- 1992–1996: Vasas SC
- 1996–2001: Dunaferr SE
National team
Years	Team	Apps	(Gls)
1990–2001	Hungary	82	(63)

Teams managed
- 2023–: Érd HC
Medal record
Women's handball
Representing Hungary
Olympic Games
Silver medal – second place	2000 Sydney	Team
European Championship
Gold medal – first place	2000 Romania	Team
Bronze medal – third place	1998 Netherlands	Team

Judit Simics (later Zsemberyné, born 28 September 1967 in Mohács) is a Hungarian former handball player who competed in the 2000 Summer Olympics, where she won the silver medal with the Hungarian team. She played on six matches and scored three goals. In 1994, she married men's handball goalkeeper Tamás Zsembery.

In January 2023 she became the head coach of Érd HC.
