= Kim Rasmussen =

Danish handball coach

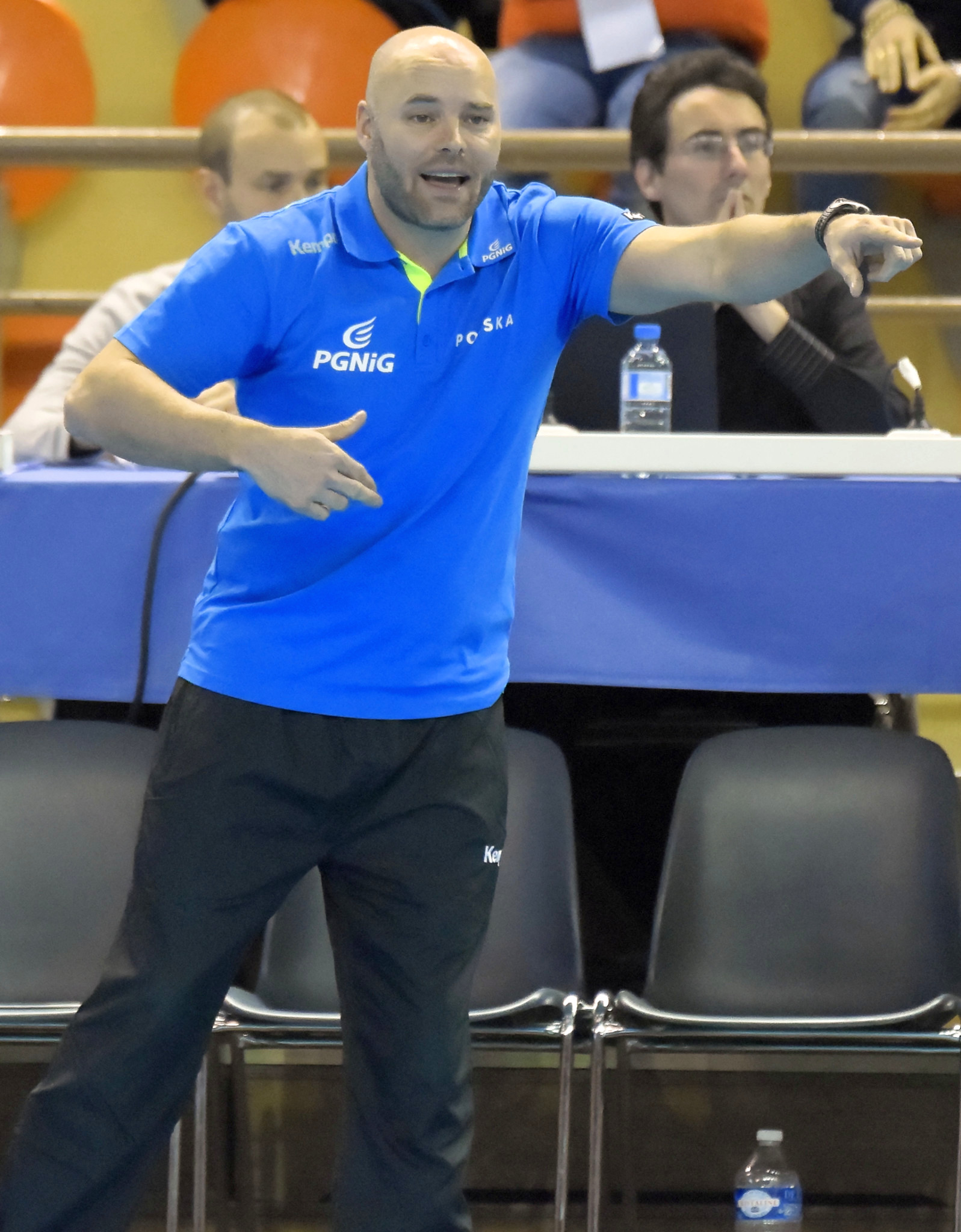

Personal information
- Nationality: Danish
- Born: 22 September 1972 (age 54)

Sport
- Sport: Handball
- Current club: Ostrovia (head coach)

Teams managed
- –: Stavsten IF
- 2010: Roskilde Håndbold
- 2010–2016: Poland (women)
- 2015–2016: CSM București
- 2016–2020: Hungary (women)
- 2020–2021: MKS Lublin
- 2020–2021: Montenegro (women)
- 2021–2022: Gloria Bistrița
- 2022–2023: South Korea (women)
- 2023: Rapid București
- 2023–: Ostrovia
Medal record
Asian Championship
Gold medal – first place	2022 South Korea

Kim Rasmussen (born 22 September 1972) is a Danish handball coach.

== Career ==
In 2010, Rasmussen took over Poland Women's national team, which he coached until 2016 and led to two semi-final finishes at the World Championships of 2013 and 2015 and took 11th place at the European Championships. He later coached the national teams of Hungary, Montenegro and South Korea.

In 2015, he took charge of the Romanian top division champions, CSM Bucharest and led them into winning the 2016 EHF Champions League in the final against Győr, as well as one Romanian Championship and one Romanian Cup. Currently working from 2023 in Poland in Ostrów.

== Honours ==
=== As manager ===
- EHF Champions League:
  - Winner: 2016
- Romanian Championship:
  - Winner: 2016
- Cupa României:
  - Winner: 2016
