= Helga Németh =

Hungarian handball player (born 1973)

Personal information
- Born: 7 August 1973 (age 53) Nagykanizsa, Hungary
- Height: 1.78 m (5 ft 10 in)

Sport
- Sport: Handball
- Position: Right back
- Current club: Retired

Youth career
- Years: Team
- 1983–1989: Olajbányász SE Nagykanizsa

Senior clubs
- Years: Team
- 1989–1991: BHG SE
- 1991–1993: TFSE
- 1993–1994: Hypo Niederösterreich
- 1994–1997: Dunaferr SE
- 1997–1998: Podravka Koprivnica
- 1998–2003: Cornexi-Alcoa
- 2003–2004: Viborg HK
- 2004–2005: Dunaferr SE
- 2005–2008: FTC Budapest
- 2008–2013: VSE Érd
National team
| Years | Team | Apps | (Gls) |
| 1991–2003 | Hungary | 142 | (490) |
Medal record
Women's handball
Representing Hungary
Olympic Games
| Bronze medal – third place | 1996 Atlanta | Team |
World Championship
| Silver medal – second place | 1995 Austria/Hungary | Team |
European Championship
| Bronze medal – third place | 1998 Netherlands | Team |

Helga Németh (born 7 August 1973 in Nagykanizsa) was during her active career a Hungarian handball player who has won the bronze medal with the Hungarian team on the 1996 Summer Olympics. She played all five matches and scored 18 goals. She played as right back.

Helga Németh has been rewarded as one of the best women handball players of all times.

After her active career as a handball player, Helga Németh started her career as a handball coach and built up her own charity to support children in need.

== Awards and recognition ==
During her active career as a handball player she won numerous tournaments and received honorable awards.

Personal achievements

- 144 times selected for the Hungarian National Team
- 1994: European Selection All Star Team Member
- 1994: Selected All-Star Right Back of the European Championship
- 1995: World Selection Member
- 1997: Selected second best Handball Player of the World (Anja Andersen (DK) voted best player due to the Danish Team won the World Championship in Germany that year)
- 2008: European Selection Player

Hungarian National Team

- 1993: World Championship 7th place
- 1994: European Championship 4th place
- 1995: World Championship 2nd place
- 1996: Bronze Medal at the Olympic Games in Atlanta, U.S.A.
- 1997: World Championship 9th place
- 1998: European Championship 3rd place
- 2002: European Championship 5th place

European Cup Winner

- 1994: BEK Hypobank (Austria)
- 1995: KEK Dunaferr (Hungary)
- 2004: EHF Viborg (Denmark)
- 2006: EHF FTC Ferencváros Torna Club (Hungary)

National League Champion and Cup Winner

- 1994: Austrian National League Champion and Cup Winner with Hypobank Team (Vienna)
- 1997: Croatian National League Champion and Cup Winner with Podravka Team (Koprivnica)
- 2004: Danish National League Champion and Cup Winner with Viborg Team (Viborg)
- 2007: Hungarian National League Champion with FTC Ferencváros Torna Club (Budapest)

== Club history ==
- 1983-1989: Oil Miners Handball Club Nagykanizsa (Hungary) under the coach László Uzsoki
- 1989-1991: BHG Budapest (Hungary)
- 1991-1993: TFSE Budapest (Hungary)
- 1993-1994: Hypobank Handball Club Vienna (Austria)
- 1994-1997: Dunaferr SE Dunaujváros (Hungary)
- 1997-1998: Podravka SC Koprivnica (Croatia)
- 1998-2003: Cornexi-Alcoa Székesvehérvár (Hungary)
- 2003-2004: VHK Viborg (Denmark)
- 2004-2005: Dunaferr SE Dunaujváros (Hungary)
- 2005-2008: FTC Ferencváros Torna Club Budapest (Hungary)
- 2008-2013: VSE Érd (Hungary) as player and coach
