= Amália Sterbinszky =

Hungarian handball player (1950–2025)

Personal information
- Full name: Amália Sterbinszky
- Nationality: Hungarian
- Born: 29 September 1950 Hajdúszoboszló, Hungary
- Died: 3 April 2025 (aged 74) Copenhagen, Denmark
- Height: 1.72 m (5 ft 8 in)

Sport
- Sport: Handball
- Position: Left Back, Playmaker

Senior clubs
- Years: Team
- 1969–1972: Ferencvárosi TC
- 1973–1982: Vasas SC
- 1982–1984: Helsingør IF
National team
Years	Team	Apps
1970–1984	Hungary	250
Medal record
Olympic Games
Bronze medal – third place	1976 Montreal	Team
World Championship
Silver medal – second place	1982 Hungary
Bronze medal – third place	1971 Netherlands
Bronze medal – third place	1975 Soviet Union
Bronze medal – third place	1978 Czechoslovakia

Amália Sterbinszky (29 September 1950 – 3 April 2025) was a Hungarian handball player who was voted the best female handballer of the twentieth century in Hungary.

== Biography ==
Sterbinszky was born on 29 September 1950. She competed in two Olympic Games (1976, 1980), winning the bronze medal at the first one. Sterbinszky also collected three bronze medals at the World Championships, and crowned her long and successful international career with a silver at the 1982 World event, which was held on home soil.

Sterbinszky finished her career in Denmark, subsequently taking the coaching position of the Danish national team.

Sterbinszky died at a hospital in Copenhagen on 3 April 2025, at the age of 74.

== Achievements ==
- Nemzeti Bajnokság I:
  - Winner: 1971, 1973, 1974, 1975, 1976, 1977, 1978, 1979, 1980, 1981, 1982
- Magyar Kupa:
  - Winner: 1970, 1972, 1974, 1976, 1978, 1979, 1980, 1981, 1982
- Damehåndboldligaen:
  - Winner: 1983, 1984
- Champions Cup:
  - Winner: 1982
  - Finalist: 1971, 1978, 1979
- Olympic Games:
  - Bronze Medalist: 1976
- World Championship:
  - Silver Medalist: 1982
  - Bronze Medalist: 1971, 1975, 1978

== Awards and recognition ==
- Nemzeti Bajnokság I Top Scorer: 1977
- Hungarian Handballer of the Year: 1974, 1976, 1977
- Golden Ring of Vasas SC: 2006
- Hungarian Handballer of the 20th Century
