= Rita Borók =

Hungarian handball player (born 1973)

Personal information
- Full name: Rita Borók
- Nationality: Hungarian
- Born: 28 July 1973 (age 53) Debrecen, Hungary
- Height: 1.86 m (6 ft 1 in)

Sport
- Sport: Handball
- Position: Right back
- Current club: Retired

Senior clubs
- Years: Team
- 1993–1997: DVSC
- 1997–1998: Ferencváros
- 1998–2000: DVSC
- 2000–2002: Viborg HK
- 2002–2003: Dunaferr SE
- 2003–2005: DVSC
National team
Years	Team	Apps	(Gls)
1996–2001	Hungary	45	(101)

Rita Borók (born 28 July 1973) is a former Hungarian handballer who played many years for Debrecen in right back position.

== Achievements ==
- Nemzeti Bajnokság I:
  - Winner: 2003
  - Silver Medallist: 1994, 1995, 1996
- EHF Cup:
  - Winner: 1996
- EHF Champions League:
  - Finalist: 2001
