= Éva Erdős =

Hungarian handball player (born 1964)

Personal information
- Born: 28 July 1964 (age 62) Budapest, Hungary

Sport
- Sport: Handball
- Position: Left wing
- Current club: Retired

Youth career
- Years: Team
- –: Budapesti Spartacus

Senior clubs
- Years: Team
- 1981–1990: Budapesti Spartacus
- 1990–1998: Vasas SC
- 1998–1999: Bondy AS
National team
Years	Team	Apps	(Gls)
1985–1997	Hungary	277	(292)
Medal record
Women's handball
Representing Hungary
Olympic Games
Bronze medal – third place	1996 Atlanta	Team
World Championship
Silver medal – second place	1995 Austria/Hungary	Team

Éva Erdős (born 28 July 1964 in Budapest) is a Hungarian handball player (left wing) who competed in the 1996 Summer Olympics and won the bronze medal with the Hungarian team. She played four matches and scored six goals.

== Awards ==
- Nemzeti Bajnokság I Top Scorer: 1990
