= Ágota Bujdosó =

Hungarian handball player (1943–2025)

Personal information
- Born: 2 June 1943 Budapest, Hungary
- Died: March 2025 (aged 81)
- Height: 174 cm (69 in)

Sport
- Sport: Handball
- Position: Goalkeeper
- Current club: —

Youth career
- Years: Team
- 1957–1960: Vasas SC

Senior clubs
- Years: Team
- 1960–1978: Vasas SC
National team
Years	Team	Apps	(Gls)
1965–1977	Hungary	158	(1)
Medal record
World Championship
Bronze medal – third place	1971 Netherlands	Team
Bronze medal – third place	1975 Soviet Union	Team
Olympic Games
Bronze medal – third place	1976 Montreal	Team

Ágota Bujdosó (2 June 1943 – March 2025) was a Hungarian international handball goalkeeper.

== Career ==
=== Club ===
Bujdosó started her career in 1957 in Vasas and remained with the Angyalföld-based team. She enjoyed her best spell in the seventies, when they won the Hungarian Championship for seven consecutive seasons (1972–1978) and capturing four Hungarian cup titles. In addition, she reached the final of the European Champions Cup 1978, but lost 19–14 to TSC Berlin.

For her service, the loyal shot-stopper was awarded the Golden Ring of Vasas SC in 1991.

=== International ===
Bujdosó made her debut in the Hungary national team in 1965 and with them won 168 caps until her retirement in 1977. From 1969 she was the captain of the team. She was present on several international competitions, starting in 1971, when they won bronze medal on the World Championship against Romania in the placement match. Two years later she played unsuccessfully with Hungary for the bronze, but lost to the Soviets. In 1975, on her third and last World Championship they took the bronze medal.

She was also on the unsuccessful squad that, in the tightly contested tournament at the 1976 Olympic Games, Hungary lost the silver medal to East Germany.

== Death ==
Bujdosó died in March 2025, at the age of 81.

== Achievements ==
- Nemzeti Bajnokság I:
  - Winner: 1972, 1973, 1974, 1975, 1976, 1977, 1978
  - Bronze Medallist: 1967, 1969, 1971
- Magyar Kupa:
  - Winner: 1969, 1971, 1974, 1976
- European Champions Cup:
  - Finalist: 1978
- World Championship
  - Bronze Medallist: 1971, 1975
- Olympic Games:
  - Bronze Medallist: 1976

== Individual awards ==
- Hungarian Handballer of the Year: 1973, 1975
- Golden Ring of Vasas SC: 1991
