= Kinga Janurik =

Hungarian handball player (born 1991)

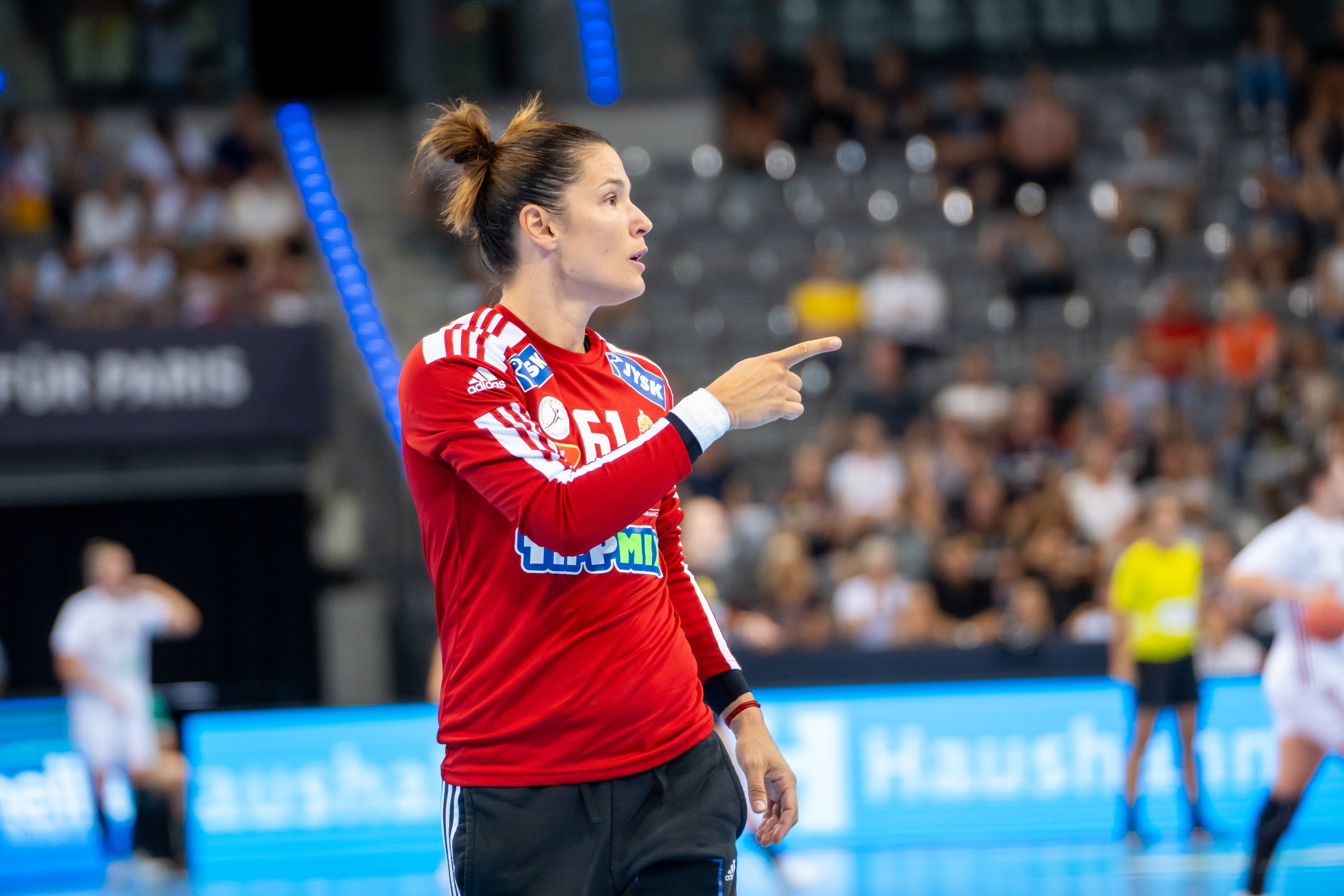
- 2024

Personal information
- Nationality: Hungarian
- Born: 6 November 1991 (age 34) Budapest, Hungary
- Height: 1.76 m (5 ft 9 in)

Sport
- Sport: Handball
- Position: Goalkeeper
- Current club: Ferencváros
- Number: 13

Senior clubs
- Years: Team
- –: Körösi DSE
- –: Újbuda TC
- 2010–2020: Érd HC
- 2020–: Ferencváros
National team
Years	Team	Apps	(Gls)
2015–	Hungary	85	(1)
Medal record
European Championship
Bronze medal – third place	2024 Austria/Hungary/Switzerland
- Updated on 10 December 2025

Kinga Janurik (born 6 November 1991) is a Hungarian handballer for Ferencváros and the Hungary national team.

At the 2024 European Championship she was part of the Hungarian team that won bronze medals, losing to Norway in semifinal and beating France in the third place play-off. This was the first Hungarian medals since 2012.

== Achievements ==
- Nemzeti Bajnokság I:
  - Gold: 2021
  - Silver: 2022, 2023
  - Bronze: 2013, 2014, 2015, 2016, 2017, 2018
- Magyar Kupa:
  - Gold: 2022, 2023, 2024, 2025
  - Silver: 2016, 2018
  - Bronze: 2015, 2019
- EHF Champions League:
  - Silver: 2023
- EHF Cup:
  - Semifinalist: 2015
