= Rita Borbás =

Hungarian handball player (born 1980)

Personal information
- Nationality: Hungarian
- Born: 21 December 1980 (age 45) Budapest, Hungary
- Height: 1.67 m (5 ft 6 in)

Sport
- Sport: Handball
- Position: Line Player

Senior clubs
- Years: Team
- –2001: Vasas SC
- 2001–2003: Esztergomi KSE
- 2003–2005: Győri ETO KC
- 2005–2008: Dunaferr
- 2008–2009: CS Oltchim Rm. Vâlcea
- 2009–2011: DVSC
- 2011–2012: UKSE Szekszárd
- 2012–2013: Budapest SE
- 2013–2014: MTK Budapest
- 2014–2015: Vasas SC
- 2015–2018: Szentendrei NKE
National team
Years	Team	Apps	(Gls)
2005–2008	Hungary	73	(112)
Medal record
World Championship
Bronze medal – third place	2005 Russia	Team

Rita Borbás (born 21 December 1980) is a Hungarian former handballer.

She made her international debut on 2 March 2005 against Denmark. She participated on the World Championship yet in that year and she was present on the next one in 2007.

Borbás also took part on the European Championship in 2006 and represented Hungary on the 2008 Summer Olympics in China, where the national team finished fourth.

== Achievements ==
- Nemzeti Bajnokság I:
  - Winner: 2005
  - Silver Medallist: 2004, 2008, 2010, 2011
  - Bronze Medallist: 2006, 2007
- Magyar Kupa:
  - Winner: 2005
  - Silver Medallist: 2004, 2008, 2011
  - Bronze Medallist: 2007
- Liga Naţională:
  - Winner: 2009
- EHF Cup:
  - Finalist: 2004, 2005
- World Championship:
  - Bronze Medallist: 2005
