= Marianna Nagy (handballer) =

Hungarian handball player (born 1957)

Personal information
- Full name: Marianna Gódorné Nagy
- Nationality: Hungarian
- Born: 30 August 1957 (age 69) Csorna, Hungary
- Height: 1.70 m (5 ft 7 in)

Sport
- Sport: Handball
- Position: Back Player

Senior clubs
- Years: Team
- 1970–1976: Csornai SE
- 1976–1980: Testnevelési Főiskola SE
- 1980–1986: Vasas SC
- 1986–1988: TSV Bayer 04 Leverkusen
- 1988–1991: Hypobank Südstadt
National team
Years	Team	Apps
1974–1987	Hungary	281
–	Austria	
Medal record
Olympic Games
Bronze medal – third place	1976 Montreal	Team
World Championship
Silver medal – second place	1982 Hungary
Bronze medal – third place	1975 Soviet Union
Bronze medal – third place	1978 Czechoslovakia

Marianna Gódorné Nagy (born 30 August 1957) is a former Hungarian handball player and Olympic medalist. With her 281 matches played for the Hungarian national team, she is the all-time record-holder.

== Career ==
Nagy started her career in her hometown club Csornai SE. In 1976 she moved to Budapest to study on the University of Physical Education and to play for their team. Nagy graduated in 1980 and signed to Vasas SC yet in that year. She spent six years with the red and blues, during which time she won a number of domestic titles and obtained the Champions Cup. In 1986 she moved abroad to play for Bayer Leverkusen, the team that was coached by her husband, Mihály Gódor, whom she met during his university years. Nagy switched to Hypobank Südstadt in 1988; with them she has made the Austrian championship and Champions Cup double two times in row.

She played 281 times for the Hungarian national team between 1974 and 1987 and won a number of medals, including an Olympic Games bronze in 1976 and a World Championship silver in 1982.

Following her good performances in Hypo, Nagy, who was not a member of the Hungarian basis for that time, received an invitation from the Austrian Handball Federation to represent Austria on international level. Nagy accepted the offer and played over one hundred times for Austria until her retirement.

After Nagy gave up professional handball, she settled with her husband in Szentgyörgyvölgy, where they run a hotel with a sports and fitness center in the countryside. Nagy also coaches the handball club of Lenti, which plays in the county championship, while her husband serves as the assistant coach of the Austrian women's national team.

== Achievements ==
- Nemzeti Bajnokság I:
  - Winner: 1981, 1982, 1984, 1985
- Magyar Kupa:
  - Winner: 1981, 1982, 1983, 1985
- Women Handball Austria:
  - Winner: 1989, 1990, 1991
- ÖHB Cup:
  - Winner: 1990, 1991
- Champions Cup:
  - Winner: 1982, 1989, 1990
- Olympic Games:
  - Bronze Medalist: 1976
- World Championship:
  - Silver Medalist: 1982
  - Bronze Medalist: 1975, 1978

== Awards and recognition ==
- Hungarian Handballer of the Year: 1979, 1980, 1981, 1982, 1985
