= Erzsébet Csajbók =

Hungarian handball player (1953–2025)

Medal record

Representing Hungary

Women's Handball

Olympic Games
Bronze medal – third place	1976 Montreal	Team

World Championship
Silver medal – second place	1982 Hungary	Team
Bronze medal – third place	1975 Soviet Union	Team
Bronze medal – third place	1978 Czechoslovakia	Team

Erzsébet Csajbók (née Németh; 10 February 1953 – 6 December 2025) was a Hungarian handball player who competed in the 1976 Summer Olympics and the 1980 Summer Olympics.

== Biography ==
Csajbók was born in Magyarkeresztúr on 10 February 1953.

In 1976, she won the bronze medal with the Hungarian team. She played four matches and scored five goals. Four years later, she was a member of the Hungarian team which finished fourth. She played all five matches and scored six goals.

Csajbók died on 6 December 2025, at the age of 72.
