= Ildikó Pádár =

Hungarian handball player (born 1970)

Personal information
- Born: 19 April 1970 (age 56) Heves, Hungary
- Height: 178 cm (70 in)

Sport
- Sport: Handball
- Position: Line player
- Current club: Retired

Youth career
- Years: Team
- 1983–1987: Eger

Senior clubs
- Years: Team
- 1987–2003: Ferencvárosi TC
National team
Years	Team	Apps	(Gls)
1990–2003	Hungary	202	(286)
Medal record
Women's handball
Representing Hungary
Olympic Games
Silver medal – second place	2000 Sydney	Team
Bronze medal – third place	1996 Atlanta	Team
World Championship
Silver medal – second place	1995 Austria/Hungary	Team
European Championship
Gold medal – first place	2000 Romania	Team
Bronze medal – third place	1998 Netherlands	Team

Ildikó Pádár (born 19 April 1970 in Heves) is a Hungarian retired handball player (line player) and Olympic medalist. She received a bronze medal at the 1996 Summer Olympics in Atlanta. She received a silver medal at the 2000 Summer Olympics in Sydney.
