= Nikolett Brigovácz =

Hungarian handball player (born 1977)

Personal information
- Full name: Nikolett Brigovácz
- Nationality: Hungarian
- Born: 5 August 1977 (age 49)
- Height: 1.8 m (5 ft 11 in)

Sport
- Sport: Handball
- Position: Right back
- Current club: Retired

Senior clubs
- Years: Team
- 1994–1995: Ferencváros
- 1996–1997: Ferencváros
- 1997–1998: Budapest Spartacus SC
- 1998–1999: Dunaferr SE
- 1999–2000: Ferencváros
- 2000–2001: Hypo Niederösterreich
- 2001–2002: Slagelse FH
- 2002–2003: Ferencváros
- 2003–2004: Madeira Andebol SAD
- 2004–2005: CB Mar Alicante
- 2005: Cornexi Alcoa-HSB Holding
- –: FSZSE II
- 2012: Kispest NKK
National team
Years	Team	Apps	(Gls)
1999–2002	Hungary	24	(69)
Medal record
Gold medal – first place	2000 Romania	Team

Nikolett Brigovácz (born 5 August 1977) is a former Hungarian handball player, her position was right back. She is a European champion. During her career she played beside of Hungary, in Austria, in Denmark, in Spain and in Portugal.

== Achievements ==
- Nemzeti Bajnokság I:
  - Winner: 1997, 1999, 2000
- Magyar Kupa:
  - Winner: 1995, 1997
- European Championship:
  - Winner: 2000
