= Márta Megyeri =

Hungarian handball player (born 1952)

Medal record

Representing Hungary

Women's Handball

Olympic Games
Bronze medal – third place	1976 Montreal	Team

World Championship
Bronze medal – third place	1975 Soviet Union	Team

Márta Megyeri (née Pacsai, born August 29, 1952, in Dorog) is a former Hungarian handball player who competed in the 1976 Summer Olympics, where she won the bronze medal with the Hungarian team. She had played in one match.
