= Klára Bonyhádi =

Hungarian handball player (born 1955)

Medal record

Representing Hungary

Women's Handball

World Championship
Silver medal – second place	1982 Hungary	Team

Klára Bonyhádi (born 27 November 1955 in Orosháza) is a former Hungarian handball player and World Championship silver medalist.

In 1980 she was a member of the Hungarian team which finished fourth on the Olympics. She played three in matches of the tournament.
