= Eszter Siti =

Hungarian handball player (born 1977)

Personal information
- Full name: Eszter Ágnes Siti
- Nationality: Hungarian
- Born: 12 November 1977 (age 48) Nagykanizsa, Hungary
- Height: 1.71 m (5 ft 7 in)

Sport
- Sport: Handball
- Position: Playmaker
- Current club: Retired

Senior clubs
- Years: Team
- –: Nagykanizsai Olajbányász SE
- –1995: Vasas SC
- 1995–1998: Ferencvárosi TC
- 1998–1999: Váci NKSE
- 1999–2003: Ferencvárosi TC
- 2003–2006: FCK Håndbold
- 2006–2008: RK Krim
- 2008–2009: Fehérvár KC
- 2012–2014: Fehérvár KC
National team
Years	Team	Apps	(Gls)
2000–2007	Hungary	133	(274)
Medal record
World Championship
Silver medal – second place	2003 Croatia	Team
Bronze medal – third place	2005 Russia	Team
European Championship
Gold medal – first place	2000 Romania	Team
Bronze medal – third place	2004 Hungary	Team

Eszter Ágnes Siti (born 12 November 1977 in Nagykanizsa) is a former Hungarian handball player. She is a European champion and World Championship silver medalist. Her sister, Beáta Siti, also a Hungarian international handballer, who currently works as a technical director and coach.

Siti temporarily retired from professional handball in 2009 but returned to action in the summer of 2012. Two years later, in 2014 she decided to retire for good.

== Achievements ==
- Nemzeti Bajnokság I:
  - Winner: 1996, 1997, 2000, 2002
- Magyar Kupa:
  - Winner: 1996, 1997, 2001, 2003
- Slovenian Championship:
  - Winner: 2007, 2008
- Slovenian Cup:
  - Winner: 2007, 2008
- World Championship:
  - Silver Medalist: 2003
  - Bronze Medalist: 2005
- European Championship:
  - Winner: 2000
  - Bronze Medalist: 2004
