= Ilona Nagy =

Hungarian handball player (born 1951)

Medal record

Representing Hungary

Women's Handball

Olympic Games
| Bronze medal – third place | 1976 Montreal | Team |

World Championship
| Bronze medal – third place | 1975 Soviet Union | Team |
| Bronze medal – third place | 1978 Czechoslovakia | Team |

Ilona Nagy (born 21 January 1951 in Budapest) is a former Hungarian handball player, Olympic Games and World Championship bronze medalist.
