= Tímea Sugár =

Hungarian handball player (born 1977)

Personal information
- Nationality: Hungarian
- Born: 21 October 1977 (age 48) Pécs, Hungary

Sport
- Sport: Handball
- Position: Goalkeeper

Senior clubs
- Years: Team
- 1994–1996: Pécs
- 1996–1998: Kiskunhalas
- 1998–1999: Debrecen
- 1999–2004: Ferencváros
- 2004–2007: Cornexi Alcoa
National team
Years	Team	Apps	(Gls)
2000–2007	Hungary	101	(0)

Teams managed
- 2007–2022: Alba Fehérvár KC (goalkeeper coach)
- 2022–: Budakalász FKC (goalkeeper coach)
Medal record
World Championship
Silver medal – second place	2003 Croatia	Team
Bronze medal – third place	2005 Russia	Team
European Championship
Gold medal – first place	2000 Romania	Team

Tímea Sugár (born 21 October 1977 in Pécs) is a former Hungarian international handball player and afterwards goalkeeping coach of Fehérvár KC. She played many years for Ferencváros and Fehérvár KC during her career. She won EHF cup in 2005. After her retirement in 2007, she is working as goalkeeper coach in Hungary.

In 2006, she suffered a serious knee injury at a tournament in Brazil, and although she returned in 2007, she gave up professional sports on medical advice.

== Achievements ==
- Nemzeti Bajnokság I:
  - Winner: 2000, 2002
  - Silver Medalist: 2001, 2003
  - Bronze Medalist: 2004
- Magyar Kupa:
  - Winner: 2001, 2003
- EHF Champions League:
  - Finalist: 2002
- EHF Cup:
  - Winner: 2005
- Olympic Games:
  - Silver Medalist: 2000
- World Championship:
  - Silver Medalist: 2003
  - Bronze Medalsit: 2005
- European Championship:
  - Winner: 2000
