= Beatrix Kökény =

Hungarian handball player (born 1969)

Personal information
- Full name: Beatrix Kökény
- Nationality: Hungarian
- Born: 12 March 1969 (age 57) Budapest, Hungary

Sport
- Sport: Handball
- Position: Left Back, Playmaker

Youth career
- Years: Team
- 1981–1987: Budapesti Építők SC

Senior clubs
- Years: Team
- 1987–1991: Budapesti Építők SC
- 1991–1992: Hargita KC
- 1992–2001: Ferencvárosi TC
National team
Years	Team	Apps	(Gls)
1988–2000	Hungary	245	(542)
Medal record
Olympic Games
Silver medal – second place	2000 Sydney	Team
Bronze medal – third place	1996 Atlanta	Team
World Championship
Silver medal – second place	1995 Austria / Hungary
European Championship
Gold medal – first place	2000 Romania
Bronze medal – third place	1998 Netherlands

Beatrix Kökény (born 12 March 1969) is a former Hungarian handball player, European champion and multiple Olympic medalist, who currently serves as the technical director of Ferencvárosi TC.

She is married to Géza Imre, an Olympic silver and bronze medalist épée fencer. The couple has two children, a son and a daughter, who are also handball players: Bence Imre (right wing) and Szofi Imre (goalkeeper).

== Achievements ==
- Nemzeti Bajnokság I:
  - Winner: 1989, 1990, 1991, 1994, 1995, 1996, 1997, 2000
- Magyar Kupa:
  - Winner: 1992, 1993, 1994, 1995, 1996, 1997, 2001
- EHF Cup Winners' Cup:
  - Finalist: 1994
- Olympic Games:
  - Silver Medalist: 2000
  - Bronze Medalist: 1996
- World Championship:
  - Silver Medalist: 1995
- European Championship:
  - Winner: 2000
  - Bronze Medalist: 1998

== Awards and recognition ==
- Hungarian Handballer of the Year: 1989, 1991, 1995
- Silver Cross of the Order of Merit of the Republic of Hungary: 1996
- Knight's Cross of the Order of Merit of the Republic of Hungary: 2000
