= Györgyi Őri =

Hungarian handball player (born 1955)

Medal record

Representing Hungary

Women's Handball

World Championship
Silver medal – second place	1982 Hungary	Team
Bronze medal – third place	1978 Czechoslovakia	Team

Györgyi Őri (née Győrvári; born October 11, 1955, in Békéscsaba) is a former Hungarian handball player and multiple World Championship medalist.

In 1980, she was a member of the Hungarian team which finished fourth in the Olympic Games. She played in four matches.
