= Erzsébet Balogh =

Hungarian handball player (born 1950)

Medal record

Representing Hungary

Women's Handball

World Championship
Silver medal – second place	1982 Hungary	Team
Bronze medal – third place	1971 Netherlands	Team

Erzsébet Balogh (née Nyári, born March 14, 1950, in Berettyóújfalu) is a former Hungarian handball player and multiple World Championship medalist. In 1980 she was also member of the Hungarian team which finished fourth on the Olympic Games. She played in four matches and scored two goals on the tournament.
