= Rozália Lelkes =

Hungarian handball player (born 1950)

Personal information
- Full name: Rozália Lelkes
- Nationality: Hungarian
- Born: August 14, 1950 (age 76) Keszthely, Hungary

Sport
- Sport: Handball
- Position: Playmaker
- Current club: —

Senior clubs
- Years: Team
- 1964–1968: Keszthelyi Haladás
- 1968–1973: Budapesti Spartacus SC
- 1974–1981: Ferencvárosi TC
National team
Years	Team	Apps
1970–1980	Hungary	172
Medal record
Representing Hungary
Women's Handball
Olympic Games
Bronze medal – third place	1976 Montreal	Team
World Championship
Bronze medal – third place	1971 Netherlands	Team
Bronze medal – third place	1975 Soviet Union	Team
Bronze medal – third place	1978 Czechoslovakia	Team

Rozália Lelkes (née Tomann, born August 14, 1950, in Keszthely) is a former Hungarian handball player and coach. Among her achievements as club player is a Hungarian Cup and a Cup Winners' Cup title, as well as two silver medals in the Hungarian Championship. On international level she collected three bronze medals at the World Championships and also finished third at the Olympic Games in 1976.

== Achievements ==
=== Club ===
- Nemzeti Bajnokság I:
  - Runner-up: 1976, 1977
- Magyar Kupa:
  - Winner: 1977
  - Runner-up: 1972, 1978
- Cup Winners' Cup:
  - Winner: 1978
  - Finalist: 1979

=== International ===
- Olympic Games:
  - Bronze Medalist: 1976
- World Championship:
  - Bronze Medalist: 1971, 1975, 1978
