= Anikó Nagy =

Hungarian handball player (born 1970)

Personal information
- Nationality: Hungarian
- Born: 1 April 1970 (age 56) Sajószentpéter, Hungary

Sport
- Sport: Handball
- Position: right back

Senior clubs
- Years: Team
- 1992–2001: Győri ETO KC
- 2001–2002: FOX Team Nord
National team
Years	Team	Apps	(Gls)
1994–2000	Hungary	98	(208)

Anikó Nagy
Medal record

Representing Hungary

Women's Handball

Olympic Games
Silver medal – second place	2000 Sydney	Team
Bronze medal – third place	1996 Atlanta	Team

World Championship
Silver medal – second place	1995 Austria / Hungary	Team

Anikó Nagy (born April 1, 1970, in Sajószentpéter) is a former Hungarian team handball player and Olympic medalist. She received a bronze medal at the 1996 Summer Olympics in Atlanta. She received a silver medal at the 2000 Summer Olympics in Sydney.
