= Ilona Mihályka =

Hungarian handball player (born 1951)

Medal record

Representing Hungary

Women's Handball

World Championship
| Bronze medal – third place | 1975 Soviet Union | Team |
| Bronze medal – third place | 1978 Czechoslovakia | Team |

Ilona Mihályka (née Samus, born 20 June 1951 in Budapest) is a former Hungarian handball and two times World Championship bronze medalist. In 1980 she was also member of the Hungarian team which finished fourth in the Olympic Games. She played in three matches of the tournament.
