= Anikó Kántor =

Hungarian handball player (born 1968)

Personal information
- Nationality: Hungarian
- Born: 26 March 1968 (age 58) Budapest, Hungary

Sport
- Sport: Handball
- Position: right wing

Senior clubs
- Years: Team
- 1989–1995: Vasas SC
- 1995–1999: FTC
- 1999–2002: Randers HK
National team
- Years: Team
- –: Hungary
Medal record
Representing Hungary
Women's handball
Olympic Games
Silver medal – second place	2000 Sydney	Team
Bronze medal – third place	1996 Atlanta	Team
World Championship
Silver medal – second place	1995 Austria / Hungary	Team
European Championship
Gold medal – first place	2000 Romania	Team
Bronze medal – third place	1998 Netherlands	Team

Anikó Kántor (born 26 March 1968 in Budapest) is a former Hungarian team handball player and Olympic medalist, who currently works as a handball coach. She received a bronze medal at the 1996 Summer Olympics in Atlanta, and also received a silver medal at the 2000 Summer Olympics in Sydney.
