= Rita Deli =

Hungarian handball player (born 1972)

Personal information
- Full name: Rita Deli
- Nationality: Hungarian
- Born: 21 August 1972 (age 54) Tatabánya, Hungary

Sport
- Sport: Handball
- Position: Left back

Senior clubs
- Years: Team
- –: Tatabányai SC
- –: Budapesti Spartacus SC
- 1990–1994: Testnevelési Főiskola SE
- 1994–1997: Dunaferr SE
- 1997–1998: Vasas SC
- 1998–2000: Ferencvárosi TC
- 2000–2002: Hypobank Niederösterreich
- 2002–2004: Alcoa FKC
National team
Years	Team	Apps	(Gls)
1989–2001	Hungary	110	(282)

Teams managed
- 2016–2020: Alba Fehérvár KC
Medal record
Olympic Games
Silver medal – second place	2000 Sydney	Team
European Championship
Bronze medal – third place	1998 Netherlands	Team

Rita Deli (born 21 August 1972 in Tatabánya) is a former Hungarian team handball player who received the silver medal at the 2000 Summer Olympics in Sydney and collected the bronze at the 1998 European Championship in the Netherlands.

She was forced to retire because of a recurrent Achilles tendon injury in 2004. Deli worked from 2016 until 2020 as the head coach for her former club Alcoa FKC. She currently works at Hungarian tv channels Sport1 and M4 Sport.

== Achievements ==
- Nemzeti Bajnokság I:
  - Winner: 2000
- Women Handball Austria:
  - Winner: 2001, 2002
- ÖHB Cup:
  - Winner: 2001, 2002
- EHF Cup Winners' Cup:
  - Winner: 1995

== Awards and recognition ==
- Nemzeti Bajnokság I Top Scorer: 1999, 2000
- Knight's Cross of the Order of Merit of the Republic of Hungary: 2000
