= Éva Angyal =

Hungarian handball player (born 1955)

Medal record

Representing Hungary

Women's Handball

Olympic Games
Bronze medal – third place	1976 Montreal	Team

World Championship
Silver medal – second place	1982 Hungary	Team
Bronze medal – third place	1975 Soviet Union	Team
Bronze medal – third place	1978 Czechoslovakia	Team

Éva Angyal (born 18 April 1955 in Budapest) is a former Hungarian handball player, World Championship silver medalist and Olympic Games bronze medalist.
