= Klára Csík =

Hungarian handball player (born 1947)

Medal record

Representing Hungary

Women's Handball

Olympic Games
Bronze medal – third place	1976 Montreal	Team

World Championship
Silver medal – second place	1982 Hungary	Team
Bronze medal – third place	1971 Netherlands	Team
Bronze medal – third place	1975 Soviet Union	Team

Klára Csík (née Horváth, born August 5, 1947, in Kiskunhalas) is a former Hungarian handball player, World Championship silver medalist and Olympic Games bronze medalist.

== Awards ==
- Nemzeti Bajnokság I Top Scorer: 1966, 1967
