= Dóra Lőwy =

Hungarian handball player (born 1977)

Personal information
- Full name: Dóra Mercédesz Lőwy
- Nationality: Hungarian
- Born: 28 June 1977 (age 49) Tata, Hungary
- Height: 1.72 m (5 ft 8 in)

Sport
- Sport: Handball
- Position: Left Wing

Senior clubs
- Years: Team
- 1988–1991: Tatai Honvéd AC
- 1991–2003: Ferencvárosi TC
- 2003–2005: Hypo Niederösterreich
National team
Years	Team	Apps	(Gls)
1999–2002	Hungary	34	(104)
Medal record
Olympic Games
Silver medal – second place	2000 Sydney	Team

Dóra Lőwy (born 28 June 1977) is a Hungarian former handball player and Olympic medalist. She received a silver medal at the 2000 Summer Olympics in Sydney with the Hungarian national team.

== Achievements ==
- Nemzeti Bajnokság I:
  - Winner: 1994, 1995, 1996, 1997, 2000, 2002
- Magyar Kupa:
  - Winner: 1994, 1995, 1996, 1997
- Women Handball Austria:
  - Winner: 2004, 2005
- ÖHB Cup:
  - Winner: 2004, 2005
- EHF Cup Winners' Cup:
  - Finalist: 1994
- Olympic Games:
  - Silver Medalist: 2000
