= Zsuzsanna Kézi =

Hungarian handball player (1945–2021)

Medal record

Representing Hungary

Women's Handball

Olympic Games
Bronze medal – third place	1976 Montreal	Team

World Championship
Bronze medal – third place	1975 Soviet Union	Team

Zsuzsanna "Zsuzsa" Kézi (née Pethő, 14 May 1945 – 18 May 2021) was a Hungarian handball player, Olympic Games and World Championship bronze medalist. She was born in Bakonybánk. She won the bronze medal on the 1975 World Championship in the Soviet Union, and added another bronze to her collection on the 1976 Summer Olympics.
