= Mária Berzsenyi =

Hungarian handball player (born 1946)

Medal record

Representing Hungary

Women's Handball

Olympic Games
Bronze medal – third place	1976 Montreal	Team

World Championship
Bronze medal – third place	1975 Soviet Union	Team
Bronze medal – third place	1978 Czechoslovakia	Team

Mária Berzsenyi (born 31 October 1946 in Sármellék, Zala) is a former Hungarian handball goalkeeper, Olympic Games and World Championship bronze medalist.

She has won the bronze medal with the Hungarian national team on the 1975 World Championship, a success she repeated in the following year on the Olympic Games. Four years later she was a member of the Hungarian team which finished fourth in the 1980 Olympic Games. She played in three matches.
