= Anikó Meksz =

Hungarian handball player (born 1965)

Personal information
- Nationality: Hungarian
- Born: 18 June 1965 (age 61) Szekszárd, Hungary

Sport
- Sport: Handball
- Position: Goalkeeper
- Current club: Retired

Senior clubs
- Years: Team
- 1982–1986: Tatabánya KC
- 1986–1996: Dunaferr SE
- 1996–1999: AS Bondy
- 1999–2002: Alfortville
National team
| Years | Team | Apps | (Gls) |
| 1990–1997 | Hungary | 110 | (1) |

Anikó Meksz (born 18 June 1965 in Szekszárd) is a former Hungarian handball goalkeeper who competed in the 1996 Summer Olympics and won the bronze medal with the Hungarian team.

== Achievements ==
=== Club ===
With Dunaferr NK

- Magyar Kupa:
  - Finalist: 1994
- EHF Cup Winners' Cup:
  - Winner: 1995

=== International ===
- Olympic Games:
  - Bronze Medalist: 1996
    Anikó Meksz
    Medal record
    Women's handball
    Representing Hungary
    Olympic Games
    | Bronze medal – third place | 1996 Atlanta | Team |
    World Championship
    | Silver medal – second place | 1995 Austria / Hungary | Team |
- World Championship:
  - Silver Medalist: 1995
  - 7th: 1993
  - 9th: 1999
- European Championship:
  - 4th: 1994
  - 10th: 1996
