= András Németh (handball) =

Hungarian handball player and coach (born 1953)

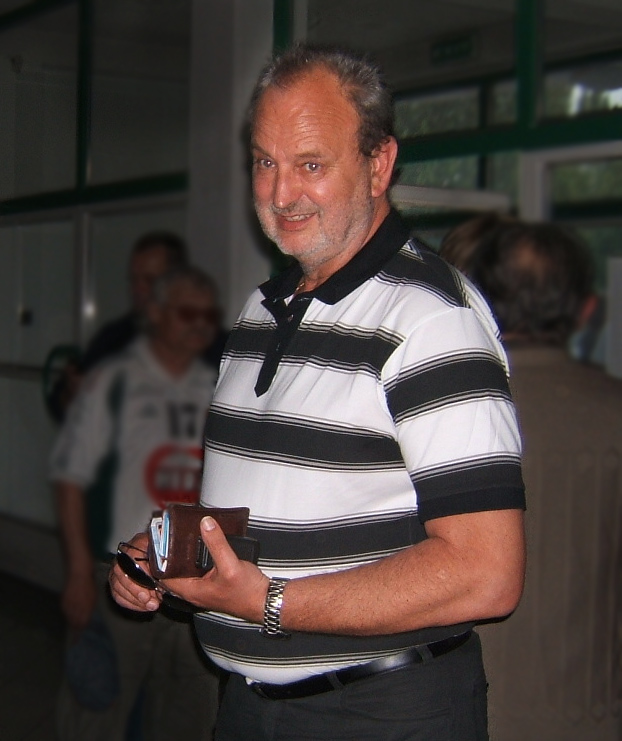
Németh András (2008)

András Németh (born 12 August 1953) is a Hungarian handball coach for the Hungarian women's national team.
