= 1976 Olympics =

1976 Olympics refers to both:

- The 1976 Winter Olympics, which were originally to be held in Denver, United States, but relocated to Innsbruck, Austria
- The 1976 Summer Olympics, which were held in Montreal, Canada
