= Vilmos Imre =

Hungarian handball player and coach (born 1968)

Vilmos Imre (born 27 March 1968 in Székesfehérvár) is a Hungarian handball coach and former handball player. He is coach at Hungarian Handball Academy.
