= 2011–12 Nemzeti Bajnokság I (women's handball) =

- League: Nemzeti Bajnokság I
- Sport: Team handball
- Duration: 4 September 2011 – 19 May 2012

Regular season
- Top scorer: Anita Bulath (HUN) (159 goals)

Playoffs
- NB I champions: Győri ETO KC
- NB I runners-up: Ferencvárosi TC

Nemzeti Bajnokság I seasons
- ← 2010–11 2012–13 →

The 2011–12 Nemzeti Bajnokság I was the sixty-first edition of the top level championship in the Hungarian team handball for women. The regular season began on 4 September 2011 and concluded on 31 March 2011, followed by the classification rounds and the playoff finals.

Defending champions Győri Audi ETO KC won the regular season with a perfect performance and easily absolved their semi-finals matches as well, and marched into the finals where they met FTC-Rail Cargo Hungaria, which overcame Siófok KC-Galerius Fürdő with a double victory. In the closest final of the recent years, ETO eventually managed to retain their league title: they won the first leg of the finals to 37–33, coming back from 6 goals behind, while in the second leg the teams went head to head till the dying minutes, when by a one-goal ETO lead, with no time left on the clock, Ferencváros was awarded a penalty. Jelena Živković stepped to the 7 meters line with the chance to equalize the match and save it for penalty shootouts. However, retiring goalkeeper Katalin Pálinger, who played her last match in Győr saved the penalty shot and ETO celebrated their fifth championship in a row and ninth overall.

== Overview ==
Locations of the 2011–12 Nemzeti Bajnokság I teams

=== Teams ===
A total of twelve teams will compete in the league, including eleven clubs that participated in the past season's championship, joined by freshly promoted Kiskunhalas NKSE. Although officially bottom two teams get relegated and replaced by the Eastern and Western group winners of the second division, Mohácsi TE expressed that they have no desire to advance to the top division mostly for financial reasons. Therefore, following the decision of the Hungarian Handball Federation, eleventh placed UKSE Szekszárd could maintain its Nemzeti Bajnokság I membership. Twelfth placed Újbuda TC could not avoid relegation, after recorded only one victory during the whole season. Newcomers Kiskunhalas debuted in the Nemzeti Bajnokság I in 2004 and achieved their best result during the 2005–2006 season, when they finished sixth. In 2010 they suffered a level drop, but climbed back to the Nemzeti Bajnokság I immediately.

League winners Győri Audi ETO KC also entered the EHF Champions League in the group phase, while runners-up DVSC-Fórum began their European adventure in the qualifying stage of the competition. 2011 bronze medalists FTC-Rail Cargo Hungaria entered the EHF Cup Winners' Cup as title holders, having defeated CB Mar Alicante in the previous year's finals to 57–52. Since both 2010–2011 Hungarian cup finalists qualified for the EHF Champions League via their league position, the spot reserved for the Magyar Kupa winners was passed to cup third Alcoa FKC RightPhone, which joined Ferencvárosi TC in the EHF Cup Winners' Cup. Fourth placed Váci NKSE, that reached the quarterfinals of the EHF Cup in the past season, had the chance to repeat their good run, while Budapest Bank-Békéscsabai ENKSE, which made an early exit in the 2010–11 EHF Cup, got the opportunity to improve their European balance this time.

=== Sponsorship changes ===
Previous season's semifinalist Vác announced yet during the summer break, that they have split with their main sponsor SYMA, which could not guarantee the financial background they did earlier and eventually stepped down. As a result, the team have lost some of their key players and entered the season with a number of youngsters promoted from the second team, competing under their old name Váci NKSE. Meanwhile, DVSC agreed on a deal with the local mall center Fórum Debrecen, which became the club's new main sponsor, altering its name to DVSC-Fórum. In addition, on the same day they have signed a media contract with regional television Alföld TV, and under the terms of the agreement all of their matches will be live broadcast by the television station.

=== Arenas and locations ===
Team	Location	Arena	Capacity
Alcoa FKC RightPhone	Székesfehérvár	Köfém Sportcsarnok	1,200
Budapest Bank-Békéscsabai Előre NKSE	Békéscsaba	Városi Sportcsarnok	2,300
Dunaújvárosi NKS	Dunaújváros	Dunaújvárosi Sportcsarnok	1,200
DVSC-Fórum	Debrecen	Hódos Imre Rendezvénycsarnok	1,800
ÉTV-Érdi VSE	Érd	Batthyány Sportcsarnok	500
FTC-Rail Cargo Hungaria	Ferencváros, Budapest	Főtáv FTC Kézilabda Aréna	1,300
Győri Audi ETO KC	Győr	Magvassy Mihály Sportcsarnok	2,800
Kiskunhalas NKSE	Kiskunhalas	Vári Szabó István Sportcsarnok	500
Siófok KC-Galerius Fürdő	Siófok	Beszédes József Sportcsarnok	550
UKSE Szekszárd	Szekszárd	Városi Sportközpont	1,200
Váci NKSE	Vác	Városi Sportcsarnok	1,200
Veszprém Barabás KC	Veszprém	Március 15. úti Sportcsarnok	2,500

== Regular season ==
=== Results ===
Home \ Away	ALC	BEK	DUN	DFO	ERD	FTC	GYO	KIS	SKC	USZ	VAC	VKC
Alcoa FKC RightPhone		28–19	36–29	36–28	25–26	29–36	21–49	30–27	21–28	24–24	28–26	29–29
Budapest Bank-Békéscsabai ENKSE	24–20		22–33	28–27	26–31	29–28	24–36	29–36	29–29	23–22	27–28	26–26
Dunaújvárosi NKS	31–30	38–41		42–32	26–27	33–47	28–45	28–28	27–32	31–32	29–25	36–31
DVSC-Fórum	28–24	28–20	31–26		32–30	24–36	22–43	30–27	31–26	31–24	25–29	24–26
ÉTV-Érdi VSE	31–30	27–22	35–26	28–22		32–36	30–47	41–20	25–23	36–27	31–21	28–24
FTC-Rail Cargo Hungaria	30–27	38–26	43–32	32–27	34–25		30–41	45–37	40–28	46–28	29–25	39–30
Győri Audi ETO KC	44–21	33–25	37–24	46–18	47–22	37–20		39–25	30–20	49–27	37–23	44–26
Kiskunhalas NKSE	27–28	22–33	35–34	27–32	25–27	27–31	31–41		26–31	26–20	23–40	27–31
Siófok KC-Galerius Fürdő	32–25	27–27	33–30	33–25	32–29	33–37	22–32	31–24		28–26	28–25	25–24
UKSE Szekszárd	27–29	31–20	23–31	25–35	23–29	28–37	17–42	36–36	29–33		27–27	27–34
Váci NKSE	31–26	26–25	37–31	34–21	10–0 (Note: The Competition Commission awarded the match to Váci NKSE with a scoreline of 10–0 because of Melinda Vincze's unauthorized appearance for ÉTV-Érdi VSE.)	26–27	27–35	38–24	29–28	29–21		34–26
Veszprém Barabás KC	26–20	34–28	30–25	29–26	26–23	31–35	27–34	30–29	29–30	35–30	27–26	

Legend: Blue = home team win; Yellow = draw; Red = away team win.

=== League table ===
Pos	Team	Pld	W	D	L	GF	GA	GD	Pts	Qualification
1	Győri Audi ETO KC	22	22	0	0	888	530	+358	44	Qualified for the Play-off Round
2	FTC-Rail Cargo Hungaria	22	19	0	3	776	655	+121	38	Qualified for the Play-off Round
3	Siófok KC-Galerius Fürdő	22	13	2	7	632	620	+12	28	Qualified for the Play-off Round
4	ÉTV-Érdi VSE	22	14	0	8	613	604	+9	28	Qualified for the Play-off Round
5	Váci NKSE	22	12	1	9	616	575	+41	25	Qualified for the Classification Round 5–8
6	Veszprém Barabás KC	22	11	2	9	631	645	−14	24	Qualified for the Classification Round 5–8
7	DVSC-Fórum	22	9	0	13	599	671	−72	18	Qualified for the Classification Round 5–8
8	Alcoa FKC-RightPhone	22	7	2	13	587	652	−65	16	Qualified for the Classification Round 5–8
9	Budapest Bank-Békéscsabai Előre NKSE	22	6	3	13	573	648	−75	15	Qualified for the Classification Round 9–12
10	Dunaújvárosi NKS	22	6	1	15	670	732	−62	13	Qualified for the Classification Round 9–12
11	Kiskunhalas NKSE	22	3	2	17	609	725	−116	8	Qualified for the Classification Round 9–12
12	UKSE Szekszárd	22	2	3	17	574	711	−137	7	Qualified for the Classification Round 9–12

=== Individual statistics ===
==== Top scorers ====
Rank	Player	Club	Matches	Goals
1	(Hungary) Anita Bulath	Veszprém Barabás KC	20	159
2	(Hungary) Bernadett Ferling	Dunaújvárosi NKS	21	158
3	(Hungary) Kinga Klivinyi	Alcoa FKC-RightPhone	21	151
4	(Russia) Kristina Trishchuk	Alcoa FKC-RightPhone	19	142
5	(Hungary) Éva Barna	Kiskunhalas NKSE	21	137
6	(Hungary) Anita Görbicz	Győri Audi ETO KC	21	135
7	(Hungary) Tamara Tilinger	Alcoa FKC-RightPhone	22	134
8	(Norway) Heidi Løke	Győri Audi ETO KC	18	122
8	(Hungary) Katalin Jenőfi	UKSE Szekszárd	22	122
10	(Hungary) Ivett Szepesi	UKSE Szekszárd	21	121

==== Worst disciplines ====
Rank	Player	Club	YC	2m	RC
1	(Serbia) Leposava Glušica	Budapest Bank-Békéscsabai ENKSE	9	26	3
2	(Hungary) Krisztina Gulya	UKSE Szekszárd	9	26	1
3	(Hungary) Gabriella Gáspár	Dunaújvárosi NKS	13	23	1
3	(Hungary) Szabina Mayer	Veszprém Barabás KC	9	20	3
5	(Hungary) Klára Szekeres	ÉTV-Érdi VSE	12	21	1
6	(Hungary) Dusmáta Takács	Dunaújvárosi NKS	10	19	2
6	(Bosnia and Herzegovina) Ivana Ljubas	Budapest Bank-Békéscsabai ENKSE	12	23	0
6	(Hungary) Katalin Jenőfi	UKSE Szekszárd	11	21	1
9	(Montenegro) Sara Vukčević	ÉTV-Érdi VSE	7	17	3
10	(Brazil) Eduarda Amorim	Győri Audi ETO KC	14	15	1

=== Team statistics ===
==== Overall ====
- Most wins – Győri Audi ETO KC (22)
- Fewest wins – UKSE Szekszárd (2)
- Most losses – UKSE Szekszárd and Kiskunhalas NKSE (17)
- Fewest losses – Győri Audi ETO KC (0)
- Most goals scored – Győri Audi ETO KC (888)
- Fewest goals scored – UKSE Szekszárd (574)
- Most goals conceded – Dunaújvárosi NKS (732)
- Fewest goals conceded - Győri Audi ETO KC (530)
- Best goal difference – Győri Audi ETO KC (+358)
- Worst goal difference – UKSE Szekszárd (–137)

==== Home ====
- Most wins – Győri Audi ETO KC (11)
- Fewest wins – UKSE Szekszárd (1)
- Most losses – Kiskunhalas NKSE (9)
- Fewest losses – Győri Audi ETO KC (0)
- Most goals scored – Győri Audi ETO KC (443)
- Fewest goals scored – Budapest Bank-Békéscsabai Előre NKSE (287)
- Most goals conceded – Dunaújvárosi NKS (370)
- Fewest goals conceded – Győri Audi ETO KC (251)

==== Away ====
- Most wins – Győri Audi ETO KC (11)
- Fewest wins – UKSE Szekszárd and Kiskunhalas NKSE (1)
- Most losses – Alcoa FKC-RightPhone, DVSC-Fórum, Dunaújvárosi NKS and UKSE Szekszárd (9)
- Fewest losses – Győri Audi ETO KC (0)
- Most goals scored – Győri Audi ETO KC (445)
- Fewest goals scored – Alcoa FKC-RightPhone (280)
- Most goals conceded – Kiskunhalas NKSE (377)
- Fewest goals conceded – Győri Audi ETO KC (279)

==== Scoring ====
- Widest winning margin: 28 goals –
  - Győri Audi ETO KC 46–18 DVSC-Fórum (15 February 2012)
- Most goals in a match: 82 goals –
  - FTC-Rail Cargo Hungaria 45–37 Kiskunhalas NKSE (1 February 2012)
- Fewest goals in a match: 45 goals –
  - Budapest Ban-Békéscsabai Előre NKSE 23–22 UKSE Szekszárd (14 January 2012)
- Most goals scored by losing team: 38 goals –
  - Dunaújvárosi NKS 38–41 Budapest Bank-Békéscsabai Előre NKSE (19 January 2012)
- Most goals scored in a match by one player: 14 goals –
  - Éva Barna for Kiskunhalas NKSE against Dunaújvárosi NKS (2 March 2012)
  - Anita Bulath for Veszprém Barabás KC against UKSE Szekszárd (9 December 2011)
  - Heidi Løke for Győri Audi ETO KC against FTC-Rail Cargo Hungaria (11 January 2012)

== Postseason ==
=== Classification round 9–12 ===
Teams finished in bottom four places after the regular season entered a classification round, in which a double round-robin system was use. According to their final position in the regular season, these four teams were awarded bonus points. Ninth placed Békéscsaba got four points, tenth placed Dunaújváros were awarded three, eleventh placed Kiskunhalas got two points and finally last placed Szekszárd received one point.

==== Results ====
Home \ Away	BEK	DUN	KIS	USZ
Békéscsabai Előre NKSE		32–27	35–25	25–16
Dunaújvárosi NKS	35–35		42–32	29–32
Kiskunhalas NKSE	33–31	27–31		33–36
UKSE Szekszárd	24–22	28–29	29–30	

Legend: Blue = home team win; Yellow = draw; Red = away team win.

==== Table ====
Pos	Team	Pld	W	D	L	GF	GA	GD	BP	Pts
1	Budapest Bank-Békéscsabai ENKSE	6	3	1	2	180	160	+20	4	11
2	Dunaújvárosi NKS	6	3	1	2	193	186	+7	3	10
3	UKSE Szekszárd	6	3	0	3	165	168	−3	1	7
4	Kiskunhalas NKSE	6	2	0	4	180	204	−24	2	6

Additional points that were awarded after the final positions in the regular season are indicated in bonus points column.

=== Classification round 5–8 ===
Teams finished between fifth and eight place also played a classification round. Similarly to the Classification round 9–12, these four teams were given bonus points depending on their position in the regular season.

==== Results ====
Home \ Away	ALC	DEB	VAC	VBK
Alcoa FKC-Right Phone		31–29	25–20	20–31
DVSC-Fórum	25–27		22–27	30–37
Váci NKSE	15–21	28–28		30–30
Veszprém Barabás KC	25–26	34–27	32–26	

Legend: Blue = home team win; Yellow = draw; Red = away team win.

==== Table ====
Pos	Team	Pld	W	D	L	GF	GA	GD	BP	Pts
1	Veszprém Barabás KC	6	4	1	1	189	159	+30	3	12
2	Alcoa FKC-Right Phone	6	5	0	1	150	145	+5	1	11
3	Váci NKSE	6	1	2	3	146	158	−12	4	8
4	DVSC-Fórum	6	0	1	5	161	184	−23	2	3

Additional points that were awarded after the final positions in the regular season are indicated in the bonus points column.

=== Championship playoff ===
Once again, title holders Győri Audi ETO KC have finished the regular season without a single defeat. Ferencváros, the club of the IXth district of Budapest, finished just behind the defending champions. The two other semi-finalists, Siófok and Érd both played in the classification round 9-12 last season, but this year they reached the last table, and fought for their first medal in the elite championship and a spot in a European cup.

==== Bracket ====
Semifinals
Győri Audi ETO KC	2
ÉTV-Érdi VSE	0
FTC-Rail Cargo Hungaria	2
Siófok KC-Galerius Fürdő	0

Finals
Győri Audi ETO KC	2
FTC-Rail Cargo Hungaria	0
Third place playoffs
ÉTV-Érdi VSE	1
Siófok KC-Galerius Fürdő	2

==== Semi-finals ====
===== Győri Audi ETO KC vs. ÉTV-Érdi VSE =====
11 April 2012; 18:00	Győri Audi ETO KC	41 – 24	ÉTV-Érdi VSE	Magvassy Mihály Sportcsarnok, Győr; Attendance: 1,000; Referees: Bacs, Bán (Hungary)
11 April 2012; 18:00	Løke 7	(20–9)	Wolf 6	Magvassy Mihály Sportcsarnok, Győr; Attendance: 1,000; Referees: Bacs, Bán (Hungary)
11 April 2012; 18:00	3× (yellow card) 2× (suspension)		3× (yellow card) 7× (suspension) 1× (red card)	Magvassy Mihály Sportcsarnok, Győr; Attendance: 1,000; Referees: Bacs, Bán (Hungary)

18 April 2012; 18:00	ÉTV-Érdi VSE	27 – 32	Győri Audi ETO KC	Batthyány Sportcsarnok, Érd; Attendance: 350; Referees: Hargitai, Markó (Hungary)
18 April 2012; 18:00	Vincze 7	(12–14)	Görbicz 12	Batthyány Sportcsarnok, Érd; Attendance: 350; Referees: Hargitai, Markó (Hungary)
18 April 2012; 18:00	3× (yellow card) 6× (suspension)		3× (yellow card) 4× (suspension)	Batthyány Sportcsarnok, Érd; Attendance: 350; Referees: Hargitai, Markó (Hungary)

Győri Audi ETO KC won series 2–0

===== FTC-Rail Cargo Hungaria vs. Siófok KC-Galerius Fürdő =====
14 April 2012; 15:00	FTC-Rail Cargo Hungaria	37 – 27	Siófok KC-Galerius Fürdő	Főtáv-FTC Aréna, Budapest; Attendance: 600; Referees: Bonifert, Oláh (Hungary)
14 April 2012; 15:00	Szamoránsky, Zácsik 9	(16–12)	Mörtel 7	Főtáv-FTC Aréna, Budapest; Attendance: 600; Referees: Bonifert, Oláh (Hungary)
14 April 2012; 15:00	3× (yellow card) 6× (suspension) 1× (red card)		3× (yellow card) 9× (suspension)	Főtáv-FTC Aréna, Budapest; Attendance: 600; Referees: Bonifert, Oláh (Hungary)

27 April 2012; 18:00	Siófok KC-Galerius Fürdő	30 – 33	FTC-Rail Cargo Hungaria	Beszédes József Sportcsarnok, Siófok; Attendance: 600; Referees: Dobrovits, Tájok (Hungary)
27 April 2012; 18:00	Szepesi 13	(16–17)	Zácsik 11	Beszédes József Sportcsarnok, Siófok; Attendance: 600; Referees: Dobrovits, Tájok (Hungary)
27 April 2012; 18:00	3× (yellow card) 4× (suspension)		3× (yellow card) 6× (suspension)	Beszédes József Sportcsarnok, Siófok; Attendance: 600; Referees: Dobrovits, Tájok (Hungary)

FTC-Rail Cargo Hungaria won series 2–0

==== Third place playoffs ====
4 May 2012; 18:00	Siófok KC-Galerius Fürdő	23 – 30	ÉTV-Érdi VSE	Beszédes József Sportcsarnok, Siófok; Attendance: 400; Referees: Baranyi, Szloska (Hungary)
4 May 2012; 18:00	Mörtel 8	(10–12)	Kovács 9	Beszédes József Sportcsarnok, Siófok; Attendance: 400; Referees: Baranyi, Szloska (Hungary)
4 May 2012; 18:00	3× (yellow card) 4× (suspension)		3× (yellow card) 5× (suspension)	Beszédes József Sportcsarnok, Siófok; Attendance: 400; Referees: Baranyi, Szloska (Hungary)

8 May 2012; 18:00	ÉTV-Érdi VSE	30 – 32	Siófok KC-Galerius Fürdő	Batthyány Sportcsarnok, Érd; Attendance: 400; Referees: Ágnecz, Sipos (Hungary)
8 May 2012; 18:00	Bognár 7	(14–17)	Mörtel 9	Batthyány Sportcsarnok, Érd; Attendance: 400; Referees: Ágnecz, Sipos (Hungary)
8 May 2012; 18:00	3× (yellow card) 4× (suspension)		3× (yellow card) 4× (suspension)	Batthyány Sportcsarnok, Érd; Attendance: 400; Referees: Ágnecz, Sipos (Hungary)

12 May 2012; 18:00	Siófok KC-Galerius Fürdő	30 – 28	ÉTV-Érdi VSE	Beszédes József Sportcsarnok, Siófok; Attendance: 600; Referees: Horváth, Marton (Hungary)
12 May 2012; 18:00	Mörtel 11	(15–12)	Tóth 9	Beszédes József Sportcsarnok, Siófok; Attendance: 600; Referees: Horváth, Marton (Hungary)
12 May 2012; 18:00	3× (yellow card) 5× (suspension)		3× (yellow card) 5× (suspension)	Beszédes József Sportcsarnok, Siófok; Attendance: 600; Referees: Horváth, Marton (Hungary)

Siófok KC-Galerius Fürdő won series 2–1

==== Finals ====
9 May 2012; 18:00	Győri Audi ETO KC	37 – 33	FTC-Rail Cargo Hungaria	Magvassy Mihály Sportcsarnok, Győr; Attendance: 1,500; Referees: Pech, Vágvölgyi (Hungary)
9 May 2012; 18:00	Løke, Jovanka Radičević 8	(17–21)	Tomori 10	Magvassy Mihály Sportcsarnok, Győr; Attendance: 1,500; Referees: Pech, Vágvölgyi (Hungary)
9 May 2012; 18:00	3× (yellow card) 5× (suspension)		3× (yellow card) 8× (suspension)	Magvassy Mihály Sportcsarnok, Győr; Attendance: 1,500; Referees: Pech, Vágvölgyi (Hungary)

16 May 2012; 18:15	FTC-Rail Cargo Hungaria	27 – 28	Győri Audi ETO KC	Főtáv-FTC Kézilabda Aréna, Budapest; Attendance: 1,200; Referees: Horváth, Marton (Hungary)
16 May 2012; 18:15	Szamoránsky, Tomori 6	(16–17)	Løke 7	Főtáv-FTC Kézilabda Aréna, Budapest; Attendance: 1,200; Referees: Horváth, Marton (Hungary)
16 May 2012; 18:15	3× (yellow card) 6× (suspension)		3× (yellow card) 3× (suspension)	Főtáv-FTC Kézilabda Aréna, Budapest; Attendance: 1,200; Referees: Horváth, Marton (Hungary)

Győri Audi ETO KC won series 2–0

== Final standing ==
Rank	Team	Qualification or relegation
1	Győri Audi ETO KC	2012–13 EHF Champions League Group stage
2	FTC-Rail Cargo Hungaria	2012–13 EHF Champions League Second qualifying round^{1}
3	Siófok KC-Galerius Fürdő	2012–13 EHF Cup
4	ÉTV-Érdi VSE	2012–13 EHF Cup
5	Veszprém Barabás KC	
6	Alcoa FKC RightPhone	
7	Váci NKSE	2012–13 EHF Cup Winners' Cup^{2}
8	DVSC-Fórum	
9	Budapest Bank-Békéscsabai Előre NKSE	2012–13 EHF Cup Winners' Cup^{3}
10	Dunaújvárosi NKS^{4}	
11	Kiskunhalas NKSE^{5}	
12	UKSE Szekszárd	Relegation to the 2012–13 Nemzeti Bajnokság I/B

^{1} Although qualified for the 2012–13 EHF Cup Winners' Cup as defending champions, FTC-Rail Cargo Hungaria enter the 2012–13 EHF Champions League via their league position, as it is a higher ranked event.

^{2} Since 2011–2012 Magyar Kupa winners Győri Audi ETO KC qualified for the 2012–13 EHF Champions League as Hungarian champions, the EHF Cup Winners' Cup spot was passed to cup second Budapest Bank-Békéscsabai Előre NKSE.

^{3} Due to FTC-Rail Cargo Hungaria's triumph in the 2011–12 EHF Cup Winners' Cup, Hungary was awarded an additional place for the 2012–13 edition of the tournament, which was taken by Hungarian cup third Váci NKSE.

^{4} Dunaújvárosi NKS withdrew from all competitions and ceased its operation during the summer of 2012. Their place was taken by the team of the local handball academy competing under the name Dunaújvárosi Kohász KA.

^{5} Although finished in the relegation zone, following Mohácsi TE, winner of the Eastern Group of the second division declined the promotion to the Nemzeti Bajnokság I, Kiskunhalas NKSE could maintain its top level membership.

2011–12 Nemzeti Bajnokság I champions

Győri Audi ETO KC
Ninth title

Team roster

Eduarda Amorim, Krisztina Bárány, Anita Görbicz, Ana Gros, Ágnes Hornyák, Anikó Kovacsics, Ivett Kurucz, Andrea Lekić, Heidi Løke, Katrine Lunde Haraldsen, Adrienn Orbán, Katalin Pálinger, Fruzsina Palkó, Szimonetta Planéta, Jovanka Radičević, Nadine Schatzl, Eszter Tóth and Orsolya Vérten.
Head coach: Karl-Erik Bøhn.

== See also ==
- List of Hungarian women's handball transfers summer 2011
