= 2009–10 Nemzeti Bajnokság I (women's handball) =

- League: Nemzeti Bajnokság I
- Sport: Team handball
- Duration: 2 September 2009 – 15 May 2010

Regular season
- Season champions: Győri ETO KC
- Top scorer: (Hungary) Tímea Tóth (225)

Playoffs
- NB I champions: Győri ETO KC
- NB I runners-up: Debreceni VSC

Nemzeti Bajnokság I seasons
- ← 2008–09 2010–11 →

The 2009–10 Nemzeti Bajnokság I was the fifty-ninth series of the national team handball championship for Hungarian women. Győri ETO KC were the defending champions and they retained the championship by going undefeated throughout the season. The competition began on 2 September 2009, and ended on 27 March 2010. The playoffs ended on 15 May, with Váci NKSE beating Békéscsabai ENKSE thus taking the bronze medal.

== Overview ==
=== Teams ===
Locations of the 2009–10 Nemzeti Bajnokság I teams

Vasas SC and PTE-PEAC were relegated to the 2009–10 Nemzeti Bajnokság I/B after finishing the 2008–09 season in the bottom two places. 1982 European Champions Cup winners, Vasas SC, ended a forty-two-year spell in the top division, having played in the Nemzeti Bajnokság I since 1967. Newcomers PTE-PEAC, the handball team of the University of Pécs, suffered relegation after just one season.

Despite ranking seventh in the last year's championship, Tajtavill-Nyíradony had to leave the competition, after they lost many of their sponsors and faced serious financial trouble. Team president János Tajta, who spent about 200–300 million Hungarian forint (about 1 million Euro) on the team during his five-year ownership, announced on 8 July 2010, that the club was finished and withdrew from all competitions.

The three teams were replaced by newly promoted Hunnia KSK, Veszprém Barabás KC and Siófok KC.

The league comprised two teams from Budapest (Ferencvárosi TC, Hunnia KSK), three clubs from Central Transdanubia (Alcoa Fehérvár KC, Dunaújvárosi NKKSE and Veszprém Barabás KC), three teams from the Southern Great Plain (ASA-Consolis Hódmezővásárely, Kiskunhalas NKSE-Bravotel and Mondi Békéscsabai ENKSE); and one each from Western Transdanubia (Győri Audi ETO KC), Southern Transdanubia (Siófok KC), Central Hungary (Váci NKSE) and the Northern Great Plain (DVSC-Korvex).

In the regular season, the sides played twice against each other side, on a home leg and an away leg. The top four teams qualified for the playoffs, in which a best-of-three system was used. Teams ranked fifth to ninth, and tenth to twelfth, decided their final rank in a classification round, using a round robin system, playing six additional rounds. They were also awarded bonus points according their final position in the regular season.

League champions and runners-up enter the 2010–2011 EHF Champions League, while the next two teams following them have the right to take part in the 2010–11 EHF Cup. The bottom two clubs get relegated.

=== Arenas and locations ===
Team	Location	Arena	Capacity
Alcoa Fehérvár KC	Székesfehérvár	Köfém Sportcsarnok	1,200
ASA-Consolis HNKC	Hódmezővásárhely	Balogh Imsi Sportcsarnok	500
Dunaújvárosi NKKSE	Dunaújváros	Dunaújvárosi Sportcsarnok	1,200
DVSC-Korvex	Debrecen	Hódos Imre Rendezvénycsarnok	1,800
Ferencvárosi TC	Ferencváros, Budapest	Főtáv FTC Kézilabda Aréna	1,300
Győri ETO KC	Győr	Magvassy Mihály Sportcsarnok	2,800
Hunnia KSK	Budapest	Vasas Sportcsarnok	1,500
Kiskunhalas NKSE-Bravotel	Kiskunhalas	Általános Művelődési Központ	500
Mondi Békéscsabai ENKSE	Békéscsaba	Városi Sportcsarnok	2,300
Siófok KC	Siófok	Beszédes József Sportcsarnok	550
Váci NKSE	Vác	Városi Sportcsarnok	860
Veszprém Barabás KC	Veszprém	Veszprém Aréna	5,000

== Regular season ==
=== Results ===
Home \ Away	ALC	ASA	DUN	DVS	FTC	GYO	HUN	KIS	MON	SIO	VAC	VKC
Alcoa Fehérvár KC		36–29	36–26	26–29	30–29	25–28	37–23	29–19	14–21	27–29	29–25	23–26
ASA-Consolis HNKC	38–32		24–26	27–34	31–29	32–33	42–19	37–22	24–24	37–35	33–33	31–29
Dunaújvárosi NKKSE	36–36	36–34		25–41	37–33	29–34	39–23	35–28	28–32	31–32	37–39	33–23
DVSC-Korvex	35–26	43–30	38–24		39–33	24–28	52–14	36–24	28–21	31–28	27–25	43–21
Ferencvárosi TC	33–28	32–28	34–24	32–29		26–36	51–20	39–22	27–30	32–26	24–29	38–26
Győri Audi ETO KC	35–22	33–25	42–22	35–23	36–31		60–19	33–14	27–15	33–25	28–23	33–22
Hunnia KSK	28–34	32–35	18–44	21–36	15–41	20–45		23–17	22–49	23–57	16–57	22–36
Kiskunhalas NKSE-Bravotel	21–29	20–29	27–29	24–33	23–27	17–40	26–17		26–36	22–30	20–31	27–31
Mondi Békéscsabai ENKSE	29–20	36–24	31–23	24–20	25–25	20–22	43–14	42–12		33–19	32–33	36–20
Siófok KC	32–31	31–28	33–32	25–32	25–27	30–33	52–19	25–24	25–25		26–33	31–33
Váci NKSE	35–24	40–19	35–30	37–30	40–27	32–36	34–24	49–21	29–23	54–27		40–21
Veszprém Barabás KC	32–34	37–33	36–36	26–35	26–26	21–36	35–27	34–25	23–25	30–26	27–34	

Legend: Blue = home team win; Yellow = draw; Red = away team win.

=== League table ===
Pos	Team	Pld	W	D	L	GF	GA	GD	Pts	Qualification
1	Győri Audi ETO KC	22	22	0	0	766	517	+249	44	Qualified for the Play-off round
2	Váci NKSE	22	17	1	4	787	581	+206	35	Qualified for the Play-off round
3	DVSC-Korvex	22	17	0	5	738	576	+162	34	Qualified for the Play-off round
4	Mondi Békéscsabai ENKSE	22	14	3	5	652	505	+147	31	Qualified for the Play-off round
5	Ferencvárosi TC	22	11	2	9	696	625	+71	24	Qualified for the Classification round 5–8
6	Siófok KC	22	9	1	12	669	670	−1	19	Qualified for the Classification round 5–8
7	Alcoa Fehérvár KC	22	9	1	12	628	638	−10	19	Qualified for the Classification round 5–8
8	Dunaújvárosi NKKSE	22	8	2	12	682	709	−27	18	Qualified for the Classification round 5–8
9	Veszprém Barabás KC	22	8	2	12	615	694	−79	18	Qualified for the Classification round 9–12
10	ASA-Consolis HNKC	22	8	2	12	670	692	−22	18	Qualified for the Classification round 9–12
11	Kiskunhalas NKSE-Bravotel	22	1	0	21	481	714	−233	2	Qualified for the Classification round 9–12
12	Hunnia KSK	22	1	0	21	459	922	−463	2	Qualified for the Classification round 9–12

=== Individual statistics ===
==== Top scorers ====
Rank	Scorer	Club	Matches	Goals
1	(Hungary) Tímea Tóth	Váci NKSE	22	225
2	(Ukraine) Olha Nikolayenko	Mondi Békéscsabai ENKSE	22	164
3	(Hungary) Judit Veszeli	Veszprém Barabás KC	22	162
4	(Hungary) Tamara Tilinger	Alcoa Fehérvár KC	22	151
5	(Hungary) Zita Szucsánszki	Ferencvárosi TC	22	144
6	(Hungary) Bernadett Ferling	Dunaújvárosi NKKSE	20	135
7	(Hungary) Anett Sopronyi	ASA-Consolis HNKC	22	127
8	(Hungary) Beatrix Balogh	Dunaújvárosi NKKSE	22	120
8	(Hungary) Anikó Kovacsics	Győri Audi ETO KC	22	120
10	(Brazil) Eduarda Amorim	Győri Audi ETO KC	22	113

==== Worst disciplines ====
Rank	Player	Club	YC	2m	RC
1	(Lithuania) Laima Bernatavičiūtė	Alcoa Fehérvár KC	15	24	2
2	(Hungary) Bernadett Horváth	Alcoa Fehérvár KC	9	21	4
3	(Hungary) Gabriella Gáspár	Dunaújvárosi NKKSE	14	22	1
4	(Hungary) Viktória Kokas	Kiskunhalas NKSE-Bravotel	10	21	2
5	(Hungary) Fruzsina Takács	Dunaújvárosi NKKSE	13	17	2
6	(Hungary) Tímea Tóth	Váci NKSE	17	15	1
6	(Hungary) Klára Szekeres	Mondi Békéscsabai ENKSE	15	16	1
8	(Hungary) Anita Bulath	DVSC-Korvex	12	16	1
9	(Hungary) Viktória Szűcs	Siófok KC	11	15	1
10	(Hungary) Judit Veszeli	Veszprém Barabás KC	12	6	0

=== Team statistics ===
==== Overall ====
- Most wins – Győri Audi ETO KC (22)
- Fewest wins – Kiskunhalas NKSE-Bravotel and Hunnia KSK (1)
- Most losses – Kiskunhalas NKSE-Bravotel and Hunnia KSK (21)
- Fewest losses – Győri Audi ETO KC (0)
- Most goals scored – Váci NKSE (787)
- Fewest goals scored – Hunnia KSK (459)
- Most goals conceded – Hunnia KSK (922)
- Fewest goals conceded – Győri Audi ETO KC (517)
- Best goal difference – Győri Audi ETO KC (+249)
- Worst goal difference – Hunnia KSK (−463)

==== Home ====
- Most wins – Győri Audi ETO KC (11)
- Fewest wins – Kiskunhalas NKSE-Bravotel and Hunnia KSK (1)
- Most losses – Kiskunhalas NKSE-Bravotel and Hunnia KSK (10)
- Fewest losses – Győri Audi ETO KC (0)
- Most goals scored – Váci NKSE (425)
- Fewest goals scored – Hunnia KSK (240)
- Most goals conceded – Hunnia KSK (451)
- Fewest goals conceded – Mondi Békéscsabai ENKSE (232)

==== Away ====
- Most wins – Győri Audi ETO KC (11)
- Fewest wins – Hunnia KSK and Kiskunhalas NKSE-Bravotel (0)
- Most losses – Hunnia KSK and Kiskunhalas NKSE-Bravotel (11)
- Fewest losses – Győri Audi ETO KC (0)
- Most goals scored – Győri Audi ETO KC (371)
- Fewest goals scored – Hunnia KSK (219)
- Most goals conceded – Hunnia KSK (471)
- Fewest goals conceded – Mondi Békéscsabai ENKSE (273)

==== Scoring ====
- Widest winning margin: 41 goals –
  - Hunnia KSK 16–57 Váci NKSE (16 January 2010)
  - Győri Audi ETO KC 60–19 Hunnia KSK (27 March 2010)
- Most goals in a match: 81 goals – Váci NKSE 54–27 Siófok KC (3 January 2010)
- Fewest goals in a match: 35 goals – Alcoa Fehérvár KC 14–21 Mondi Békéscsabai ENKSE (30 January 2010)
- Most goals scored by losing team: 37 goals – Dunaújvárosi NKKSE 37–39 Váci NKSE (5 February 2010)
- Most goals scored in a match by one player: 16 goals
  - Zita Szucsánszki for Ferencvárosi TC against ASA-Consolis HNKC (16 January 2010)
  - Viktória Koroknai for ASA-Consolis HNKC against Alcoa Fehérvár KC (13 March 2010)

== Postseason ==
The postseason was officially called Arany Ászok Rájátszás, after brewing company SABMiller bought the naming rights and changed its name to promote the Arany Ászok beer. The playoffs started on 10 April 2010 and ran until 15 May 2010.

=== Classification round 9–12 ===
Bottom four teams after the regular season entered a classification round, in which they tried to avoid relegation. The sides faced each other in a double round robin system and were given additional points according to their final position in the regular season. Ninth placed Veszprém Barabás KC got four points, tenth placed Hódmezővásárhely were awarded three, Kiskunhalas took two points and even last placed Hunnia KSK were given one point.

==== Results ====
Home \ Away	ASA	HUN	KIS	VKC
ASA-Consolis HNKC		50–21	38–19	32–32
Hunnia KSK	19–56		19–32	24–46
Kiskunhalas NKSE-Bravotel	31–31	51–20		20–32
Veszprém Barabás KC	30–28	51–35	23–18	

Legend: Blue = home team win; Yellow = draw; Red = away team win.

==== Table ====
Pos	Team	Pld	W	D	L	GF	GA	GD	BP	Pts
1	Veszprém Barabás KC	6	5	1	0	214	157	+57	4	15
2	ASA-Consolis HNKC	6	3	2	1	235	152	+83	3	11
3	Kiskunhalas NKSE-Bravotel	6	2	1	3	171	163	+8	2	7
4	Hunnia KSK ^{2}	6	0	0	6	138	286	−148	0	0 (Note: Hunnia KSK were docked one point.)

Notes:

Additional points that were awarded after the final positions in the regular season (minus any point deductions) are indicated in the bonus points column.

=== Classification round 5–8 ===
Teams ranked between fifth and eighth place, after the first part of the season, were drawn into another group. Similar to the classification round for 9–12 places, clubs were rewarded with bonus points depending on their position in the regular season.

==== Results ====
Home \ Away	ALC	DUN	FTC	SIO
Alcoa Fehérvári KC		32–37	27–26	34–23
Dunaújvárosi NKKSE	43–35		29–34	42–38
Ferencvárosi TC	32–30	37–39		37–19
Siófok KC	33–31	36–29	32–34	

Legend: Blue = home team win; Yellow = draw; Red = away team win.

==== Table ====
Pos	Team	Pld	W	D	L	GF	GA	GD	BP	Pts
1	Ferencvárosi TC	6	4	0	2	200	176	+24	4	12
2	Dunaújvárosi NKKSE	6	4	0	2	219	212	+7	1	9
3	Siófok KC	6	2	0	4	181	207	−26	3	7
4	Alcoa Fehérvár KC	6	2	0	4	189	194	−5	2	6

Additional points that were awarded after the final positions in the regular season are indicated in bonus points column.

=== Championship playoff ===
The top four teams of the regular season continued the battle for the title in a best-of-three playoff system, in which if a match ends with a draw, the winner is decided by penalty shootout. Top ranked Győr met with Békéscsaba, while Vác enjoyed home court advantage over DVSC, after topping the Debrecen-based club by one point in the regular season.

==== Bracket ====
Semifinals
Győri Audi ETO KC	2
Mondi B'csabai ENKSE	0
Váci NKSE	0
DVSC-Korvex	2

Finals
Győri Audi ETO KC	2
DVSC-Korvex	0
Third place playoffs
Mondi B'csabai ENKSE	1
Váci NKSE	2

==== Semifinals ====
===== Győri Audi ETO KC vs. Mondi Békéscsabai ENKSE =====
7 April 2010; 18:00	Győri Audi ETO KC	32–24	Mondi Békéscsabai ENKSE	Magvassy Mihály Sportcsarnok, Győr; Attendance: 1,500; Referees: Andorka, Huckler (Hungary)
7 April 2010; 18:00	Görbicz 7	(16–14)	Nikolayenko 9	Magvassy Mihály Sportcsarnok, Győr; Attendance: 1,500; Referees: Andorka, Huckler (Hungary)
7 April 2010; 18:00	2× (yellow card) 3× (suspension)	Report	3× (yellow card) 2× (suspension)	Magvassy Mihály Sportcsarnok, Győr; Attendance: 1,500; Referees: Andorka, Huckler (Hungary)

21 April 2010; 18:00	Mondi Békéscsabai ENKSE	22–30	Győri Audi ETO KC	Városi Sportcsarnok, Békéscsaba; Attendance: 1,400; Referees: Horváth, Marton (Hungary)
21 April 2010; 18:00	Bódi, Szekeres 5	(9–14)	Mravíková 6	Városi Sportcsarnok, Békéscsaba; Attendance: 1,400; Referees: Horváth, Marton (Hungary)
21 April 2010; 18:00	3× (yellow card) 2× (suspension)	Report	3× (yellow card) 4× (suspension)	Városi Sportcsarnok, Békéscsaba; Attendance: 1,400; Referees: Horváth, Marton (Hungary)

Győri Audi ETO KC won series 2–0

===== DVSC-Korvex vs. Váci NKSE =====
11 April 2010; 15:00	Váci NKSE	27–31	DVSC-Korvex	Városi Sportcsarnok, Vác; Attendance: 800; Referees: Bonifert, Oláh (Hungary)
11 April 2010; 15:00	Tóth 10	(13–14)	Lovrić 7	Városi Sportcsarnok, Vác; Attendance: 800; Referees: Bonifert, Oláh (Hungary)
11 April 2010; 15:00	3× (yellow card) 1× (suspension)	Report	3× (yellow card) 8× (suspension)	Városi Sportcsarnok, Vác; Attendance: 800; Referees: Bonifert, Oláh (Hungary)

19 April 2010; 19:00	DVSC-Korvex	31–26	Váci NKSE	Hódos Imre Rendezvénycsarnok, Debrecen; Attendance: 1,800; Referees: Birta, Lakatos (Hungary)
19 April 2010; 19:00	Bulath 7	(12–11)	Temes, Tóth 8	Hódos Imre Rendezvénycsarnok, Debrecen; Attendance: 1,800; Referees: Birta, Lakatos (Hungary)
19 April 2010; 19:00	3× (yellow card) 4× (suspension)	Report	3× (yellow card) 2× (suspension)	Hódos Imre Rendezvénycsarnok, Debrecen; Attendance: 1,800; Referees: Birta, Lakatos (Hungary)

DVSC-Korvex won series 2–0

==== Third place playoffs ====
1 May 2010; 18:00	Váci NKSE	26–29	Mondi Békéscsabai ENKSE	Városi Sportcsarnok, Vác; Attendance: 400; Referees: Herczeg, Südi (Hungary)
1 May 2010; 18:00	Temes 11	(9–15)	Nikolayenko 10	Városi Sportcsarnok, Vác; Attendance: 400; Referees: Herczeg, Südi (Hungary)
1 May 2010; 18:00	3× (yellow card)	Report	3× (yellow card) 6× (suspension)	Városi Sportcsarnok, Vác; Attendance: 400; Referees: Herczeg, Südi (Hungary)

8 May 2010; 18:00	Mondi Békéscsabai ENKSE	26 – 27 (pen.)	Váci NKSE	Városi Sportcsarnok, Békéscsaba; Attendance: 1,000; Referees: Herczeg, Südi (Hungary)
8 May 2010; 18:00	Nikolayenko 10	(14–14, 23–23)	Tóth 10	Városi Sportcsarnok, Békéscsaba; Attendance: 1,000; Referees: Herczeg, Südi (Hungary)
8 May 2010; 18:00	3× (yellow card) 2× (suspension)	Report	2× (yellow card) 3× (suspension)	Városi Sportcsarnok, Békéscsaba; Attendance: 1,000; Referees: Herczeg, Südi (Hungary)

15 May 2010; 18:00	Váci NKSE	28–22	Mondi Békéscsabai ENKSE	Városi Sportcsarnok, Vác; Attendance: 800; Referees: Dobrovits, Tájok (Hungary)
15 May 2010; 18:00	Tóth 13	(15–12)	Nikolayenko 10	Városi Sportcsarnok, Vác; Attendance: 800; Referees: Dobrovits, Tájok (Hungary)
15 May 2010; 18:00	3× (yellow card) 4× (suspension) 1× (red card)	Report	2× (yellow card) 4× (suspension)	Városi Sportcsarnok, Vác; Attendance: 800; Referees: Dobrovits, Tájok (Hungary)

Váci NKSE won series 2–1

==== Finals ====
2 May 2010; 12:15	Győri Audi ETO KC	35–21	DVSC-Korvex	Magvassy Mihály Sportcsarnok, Győr; Attendance: 1,500; Referees: Kékes, Kékes (Hungary)
2 May 2010; 12:15	Görbicz 7	(16–9)	Juhász 6	Magvassy Mihály Sportcsarnok, Győr; Attendance: 1,500; Referees: Kékes, Kékes (Hungary)
2 May 2010; 12:15	3× (yellow card) 6× (suspension)	Report	3× (yellow card) 3× (suspension)	Magvassy Mihály Sportcsarnok, Győr; Attendance: 1,500; Referees: Kékes, Kékes (Hungary)

8 May 2010; 11:55	DVSC-Korvex	25–26	Győri Audi ETO KC	Hódos Imre Rendezvénycsarnok, Debrecen; Attendance: 1,800; Referees: Nyárádi, Hanufer (Hungary)
8 May 2010; 11:55	Bogdanović 8	(12–14)	Amorim 7	Hódos Imre Rendezvénycsarnok, Debrecen; Attendance: 1,800; Referees: Nyárádi, Hanufer (Hungary)
8 May 2010; 11:55	3× (yellow card) 8× (suspension)	Report	3× (yellow card) 8× (suspension) 1× (red card)	Hódos Imre Rendezvénycsarnok, Debrecen; Attendance: 1,800; Referees: Nyárádi, Hanufer (Hungary)

Győri Audi ETO KC won series 2–0

== Final standing ==
Rank	Team	Qualification or relegation
1	Győri Audi ETO KC	2010–11 EHF Champions League Group stage
2	DVSC-Korvex	2010–11 EHF Champions League Second qualifying round
3	Váci NKSE	2010–11 EHF Cup Second round
4	Mondi Békéscsabai Előre NKSE	2010–11 EHF Cup Second round
5	Ferencvárosi TC	2010–11 EHF Cup Winners' Cup Third round ^{1}
6	Dunaújvárosi NKKSE	
7	Siófok KC	
8	Alcoa Fehérvár KC	
9	Veszprém Barabás KC	
10	ASA-Consolis HNKC ^{2}	
11	Kiskunhalas NKSE-Bravotel	Relegation to the 2011–12 Nemzeti Bajnokság I/B
12	Hunnia KSK	Relegation to the 2011–12 Nemzeti Bajnokság I/B

^{1} Because of 2009–10 Magyar Kupa winners Győri Audi ETO KC have also won the league title and thus qualified to the 2010–11 EHF Champions League, cup finalists Ferencvárosi TC have advanced to the 2010–11 EHF Cup Winners' Cup.

^{2} Withdrew from next year's competition due to lack of finance.

2009–10 Nemzeti Bajnokság I champions

Seventh title

Team roster
Eduarda Amorim, Aurelia Brădeanu, Dóra Deáki, Anita Görbicz, Ágnes Hornyák, Boglárka Hosszu, Anett Kisfaludy, Anikó Kovacsics, Szabina Mayer, Katarína Mravíková, Viktória Oguntoye, Adrienn Orbán, Katalin Pálinger, Fruzsina Palkó, Szimonetta Planéta, Simona Spiridon, Orsolya Szegedi, Patricia Szölösi, Szilvia Tarjányi, Eszter Tóth, Orsolya Vérten and Vivien Víg.
Head coach: Csaba Konkoly.
