= 2013–14 Nemzeti Bajnokság I (women's handball) =

NB I
- Season: 2013–14
- Champions: Győr (11th title)
- Relegated: Eger
- Champions League: Győr; Ferencváros
- EHF Cup: Érd; Dunaújváros
- Cup Winners' Cup: Siófok
- Matches: 164
- Goals: 8,728 (53.22 per match)
- Top goalscorer: Anita Bulath (151 goals)
- Biggest home win: Ferencváros 42–18 Eger; Győr 41–17 Eger
- Biggest away win: Veszprém 13–44 Győr
- Highest scoring: Eger 30–45 Siófok

The 2013–14 Nemzeti Bajnokság I is the 63rd season of the Nemzeti Bajnokság I, Hungary's premier Handball league.

== Team information ==
Locations of the 2013–14 Nemzeti Bajnokság I

The following 12 clubs compete in the NB I during the 2013–14 season:

Team	Location	Arena	Capacity
Békéscsabai ENKSE	Békéscsaba	Városi Sportcsarnok	2,300
Dunaújvárosi KKA	Dunaújváros	Dunaferr Sportcsarnok	1,200
Debreceni VSC	Debrecen	Hódos Imre Sportcsarnok	1,800
Eszterházy SC	Eger	Kemény Ferenc Sportcsarnok	1,100
Érd NK	Érd	Városi Sportcsarnok	1,800
Alba Fehérvár KC	Székesfehérvár	Köfém Sportcsarnok	1,200
Ferencvárosi TC	Budapest	Elek Gyula Aréna	1,300
Győri ETO KC	Győr	Magvassy Mihály Sportcsarnok	2,800
MTK Budapest	Budapest	BSE Kosárlabda Csarnok	500
Siófok KC	Siófok	Beszédes József Sportcsarnok	550
Váci NKSE	Vác	Városi Sportcsarnok	800
Veszprém BKC	Veszprém	Március 15. úti Sportcsarnok	2,500

=== Personnel and kits ===
Following is the list of clubs competing in 2013–14 Nemzeti Bajnokság I, with their manager, captain, kit manufacturer and shirt sponsor.

Team	President	Head coach	Kit manufacturer	Shirt sponsor
Békéscsabai ENKSE	Károly Szabó	(Hungary) Botond Bakó	Erreà	EUbility Group Kft., Budapest Bank
Dunaújvárosi KKA	Tamás Fehér	(Hungary) Eszter Mátéfi	hummel	—
Debreceni VSC	Balázs Makray	(Hungary) Vilmos Köstner	Erreà	TVP, OTP Bank
Eszterházy SC	Dr. László Honfi	(Hungary) Béla Herczeg	Erima	TriCSÓK
Érd NK	Lajos Bugyenszky	(Hungary) Edina Szabó	Erima	NoÉ
Alba Fehérvár KC	Imre Balassi	(Norway) Pål Oldrup Jensen	Erima	WMS
Ferencvárosi TC	Gábor Kubatov	(Hungary) Gábor Elek	Nike	Rail Cargo Hungaria
Győri ETO KC	Ernő Kelecsényi	(Spain) Ambros Martín	adidas	Audi, MVM
MTK Budapest	Tamás Deutsch	(Hungary) Gusztáv Majoros	adidas	
Siófok KC	János Fodor	(Russia) Vlagyimir Golovin	hummel	proPannonia
Váci NKSE	Erika Kirsner	(Hungary) Csaba Konkoly	Erima	Ipress Center
Veszprém BKC	Árpád Barabás	(Hungary) Kálmán Róth	adidas	Duna Takarék

== Regular season ==
=== Standings ===
	Team	Pld	W	D	L	GF	GA	Diff	Pts
1	Győri ETO KC	22	21	0	1	730	465	+265	42
2	Ferencvárosi TC	22	20	0	2	730	535	+195	40
3	Dunaújvárosi KKA	22	16	1	5	622	551	+71	33
4	Érd NK	22	14	1	7	615	542	+73	29
5	Siófok KC	22	10	1	11	593	622	−29	21
6	Váci NKSE	22	9	3	10	550	558	−8	21
7	Alba Fehérvár KC	22	10	1	11	577	563	+14	21
8	Békéscsabai ENKSE	22	9	1	12	555	561	−6	19
9	Debreceni VSC	22	9	1	12	582	623	−41	19
10	Veszprém BKC	22	7	1	14	543	586	−43	15
11	MTK Budapest	22	2	0	20	471	700	−229	4
12	Eszterházy SC	22	0	0	22	499	761	−262	0

Championship Playoff
European competition Playoff
Relegation Playoff

Pld - Played; W - Won; L - Lost; PF - Points for; PA - Points against; Diff - Difference; Pts - Points.

=== Schedule and results ===
In the table below the home teams are listed on the left and the away teams along the top.

	Békéscsabai Előre NKSE	Dunaújvárosi KA	Debreceni VSC	Eszterházy KFSC	Érd NK	Fehérvár KC	Ferencvárosi TC	Győri ETO KC	MTK Budapest KC	Siófok KC	Váci NKSE	Veszprém Barabás KC
Békéscsaba		23–24	34–22	35–29	20–26	25–21	27–32	15–30	35–23	32–26	23–21	28–24
Dunaújvárosi KA	25–17		32–21	36–26	27–34	29–27	28–26	24–27	34–29	36–23	26–22	30–25
Debrecen	27–24	28–27		33–22	24–31	21–23	25–36	20–29	33–22	31–28	25–30	26–30
Eszterházy KFSC	19–32	26–36	26–31		27–32	20–37	24–37	20–39	21–22	30–45	22–31	22–33
Érd	29–20	20–22	36–33	35–22		28–17	25–33	23–31	38–23	33–28	24–14	21–16
Fehérvár KC	28–22	18–26	21–24	39–21	31–28		21–27	26–33	33–16	35–30	24–30	27–21
Ferencváros	38–28	35–26	37–26	42–18	35–27	27–26		20–17	35–18	40–23	39–30	41–30
Győri ETO	24–20	34–22	33–26	41–17	34–24	30–18	29–21		45–24	37–22	27–21	34–25
MTK Budapest	19–29	24–34	24–26	26–25	18–28	21–27	21–39	16–45		24–25	21–31	19–27
Siófok	27–20	24–24	28–26	31–20	17–25	33–21	19–32	23–35	38–23		23–21	24–22
Vác	27–27	23–24	28–28	31–23	28–28	21–27	23–31	25–32	20–18	26–24		22–21
Veszprémi Barabás	20–19	19–30	22–26	37–19	22–20	30–30	24–27	13–44	32–20	29–32	21–25	

=== Top goalscorers ===
#	Player	Goals	Team
1	(Hungary) Anita Bulath	151	Dunaújváros
2	(Hungary) Anett Sopronyi	142	DVSC
3	(Hungary) Tamara Tilinger	129	FKC
4	(Hungary) Bernadett Ferling	122	Dunaújváros
4	(Ukraine) Olha Nikolayenko	122	Békéscsaba
6	(Hungary) Annamária Bogdanović	118	Siófok
7	(Hungary) Zsuzsanna Tomori	113	FTC
8	(Hungary) Gabriella Tóth	108	Veszprém
8	(Hungary) Szimonetta Planéta	108	Veszprém
10	(Hungary) Anna Kovács	105	Érd

== Championship Playoffs ==
Teams in bold won the playoff series. Numbers to the left of each team indicate the team's original playoff seeding. Numbers to the right indicate the score of each playoff game.

Semifinals
1	**Győri Audi ETO KC**	**35**	**33**
4	Érd	21	26
2	**FTC-Rail Cargo Hungária**	**38**	**33**
3	Dunaújvárosi KA	19	26

Final
1	**Győri Audi ETO KC**	**32**	**30**
2	FTC-Rail Cargo Hungária	25	25
Bronze medal match
3	Dunaújvárosi KA	26	26
4	**Érd**	**27**	**27**

=== Semifinals ===
==== 1st leg ====
9 April; 18:00 (UTC+2)	**Győri Audi ETO KC**	**35 – 21**	**Érd**	Győr Városi Egyetemi Csarnok, Győr; Attendance: 2,000; Referees: Tamás Tomecskó-Hunyadi, Tamás Unyatinszki
9 April; 18:00 (UTC+2)	Løke 8	(15–12)	Kovács, Schatzl 6	Győr Városi Egyetemi Csarnok, Győr; Attendance: 2,000; Referees: Tamás Tomecskó-Hunyadi, Tamás Unyatinszki
9 April; 18:00 (UTC+2)	3× (yellow card) 2× (suspension)	Report	2× (yellow card) 3× (suspension)	Győr Városi Egyetemi Csarnok, Győr; Attendance: 2,000; Referees: Tamás Tomecskó-Hunyadi, Tamás Unyatinszki

10 April; 18:30 (UTC+2)	**FTC-Rail Cargo Hungária**	**38 – 19**	**Dunaújvárosi KA**	Elek Gyula Aréna, Budapest; Attendance: 700; Referees: Katalin B.Pech, Mária Vágvölgyi
10 April; 18:30 (UTC+2)	Tomori 8	(16–11)	Vincze 7	Elek Gyula Aréna, Budapest; Attendance: 700; Referees: Katalin B.Pech, Mária Vágvölgyi
10 April; 18:30 (UTC+2)	3× (yellow card) 4× (suspension)	Report	2× (yellow card) 4× (suspension)	Elek Gyula Aréna, Budapest; Attendance: 700; Referees: Katalin B.Pech, Mária Vágvölgyi

==== 2nd leg ====
16 April; 17:45 (UTC+2)	**Érd**	**26 – 33**	**Győri Audi ETO KC**	Városi Sportcsarnok, Érd; Attendance: 2,000; Referees: Katalin B.Pech, Mária Vágvölgyi
16 April; 17:45 (UTC+2)	Kovács 9	(17–15)	Løke 14	Városi Sportcsarnok, Érd; Attendance: 2,000; Referees: Katalin B.Pech, Mária Vágvölgyi
16 April; 17:45 (UTC+2)	3× (yellow card) 4× (suspension)	Report	3× (yellow card) 4× (suspension)	Városi Sportcsarnok, Érd; Attendance: 2,000; Referees: Katalin B.Pech, Mária Vágvölgyi

Győri Audi ETO KC won series 2–0 and advanced to Final.

15 April; 18:00 (UTC+2)	**Dunaújvárosi KA**	**26 – 33**	**FTC-Rail Cargo Hungária**	Dunaferr Sportcsarnok, Dunaújváros; Attendance: 1,000; Referees: Péter Herczeg, Péter Südi
15 April; 18:00 (UTC+2)	Bulath 15	(12–17)	Tomori 10	Dunaferr Sportcsarnok, Dunaújváros; Attendance: 1,000; Referees: Péter Herczeg, Péter Südi
15 April; 18:00 (UTC+2)	2× (yellow card) 3× (suspension)	Report	3× (yellow card) 4× (suspension)	Dunaferr Sportcsarnok, Dunaújváros; Attendance: 1,000; Referees: Péter Herczeg, Péter Südi

FTC-Rail Cargo Hungária won series 2–0 and advanced to Final.

=== Final ===
==== 1st leg ====
11 May; 12:20 (UTC+2)	**FTC-Rail Cargo Hungária**	**25 – 32**	**Győri Audi ETO KC**	Elek Gyula Aréna, Budapest; Attendance: 1,000; Referees: Miklós Andorka, Róbert Hucker
11 May; 12:20 (UTC+2)	Steinbach 6	(10–18)	Görbicz 8	Elek Gyula Aréna, Budapest; Attendance: 1,000; Referees: Miklós Andorka, Róbert Hucker
11 May; 12:20 (UTC+2)	3× (yellow card) 4× (suspension)	Report	2× (yellow card) 2× (suspension)	Elek Gyula Aréna, Budapest; Attendance: 1,000; Referees: Miklós Andorka, Róbert Hucker

==== 2nd leg ====
15 May; 19:00 (UTC+2)	**Győri Audi ETO KC**	**30 – 25**	**FTC-Rail Cargo Hungária**	Győr Városi Egyetemi Csarnok, Győr; Attendance: 2,800; Referees: Katalin B.Pech, Mária Vágvölgyi
15 May; 19:00 (UTC+2)	Kovacsics, Løke 7	(16–11)	Tomori 7	Győr Városi Egyetemi Csarnok, Győr; Attendance: 2,800; Referees: Katalin B.Pech, Mária Vágvölgyi
15 May; 19:00 (UTC+2)	3× (yellow card) 3× (suspension)	Report	3× (yellow card) 5× (suspension)	Győr Városi Egyetemi Csarnok, Győr; Attendance: 2,800; Referees: Katalin B.Pech, Mária Vágvölgyi

Győri Audi ETO KC won Championship final series 2–0.

NB I 2013–14
Champions

**Győri Audi ETO KC**
**11th Title**

Team roster

1 Katrine Lunde Haraldsen, 5 Heidi Løke, 8 Dóra Hornyák, 11 Dorina Korsós, 12 Orsolya Herr, 13 Anita Görbicz, 14 Anikó Kovacsics, 18 Eduarda Amorim, 19 Viktória Rédei Soós, 20 Raphaëlle Tervel, 22 Adrienn Orbán, 24 Ivett Szepesi, 25 Szederke Sirián, 31 Ágnes Hornyák, 32 Katarina Bulatović and 33 Bernadett Bódi
Head coach: Ambros Martín

=== Third Place ===
10 May; 18:00 (UTC+2)	**Érd**	**27 – 26**	**Dunaújvárosi KA**	Városi Sportcsarnok, Érd; Attendance: 2,000; Referees: Katalin B.Pech, Mária Vágvölgyi
10 May; 18:00 (UTC+2)	Triscsuk 9	(10–13)	Bulath 7	Városi Sportcsarnok, Érd; Attendance: 2,000; Referees: Katalin B.Pech, Mária Vágvölgyi
10 May; 18:00 (UTC+2)	3× (yellow card) 9× (suspension) 1× (red card)	Report	3× (yellow card) 7× (suspension)	Városi Sportcsarnok, Érd; Attendance: 2,000; Referees: Katalin B.Pech, Mária Vágvölgyi

14 May
18:00 (UTC+2)
Dunaújvárosi KA
**26 – 27** **(ET)**
Érd
Dunaferr Sportcsarnok, Dunaújváros
Attendance: 1,000
Referees: Péter Herczeg, Péter Südi
Bulath 11
(12–9)
Schatzl 6
3× (yellow card) 3× (suspension)
Report
2× (yellow card) 4× (suspension)

FT: 22–22 ET: 4–5

Érd won series 2–0 and won the Third Place.

== Fifth place Playoff ==
=== Final standings ===
	Team	Pld	W	D	L	GF	GA	Diff	Pts	Qualification
5	Fehérvár KC	6	5	0	1	148	139	+9	12	
6	EUbility Group-Békéscsabai Előre NKSE	6	3	1	2	155	147	+8	8	
7	Siófok KC-Galerius Fürdő	6	1	1	4	131	135	−4	7	2014–15 EHF Women's Cup Winners' Cup round 3
8	Ipress Center-Vác	6	1	2	3	123	136	−13	7	

Pld - Played; W - Won; L - Lost; PF - Points for; PA - Points against; Diff - Difference; Pts - Points.

=== Results ===
In the table below the home teams are listed on the left and the away teams along the top.

	Békéscsabai Előre NKSE	Fehérvár KC	Siófok KC	Váci NKSE
Békéscsaba		29–24	30–27	30–21
Fehérvár KC	25–23		27–26	28–21
Siófok	26–19	20–22		16–16
Vác	24–24	20–22	21–16	

== Relegation Round ==
=== Final standings ===
	Team	Pld	W	D	L	GF	GA	Diff	Pts	Relegation
9	DVSC-TVP	6	6	0	0	195	156	+39	16	
10	Veszprémi Barabás-Duna Takarék	6	4	0	2	178	142	+26	11	
11	MTK Budapest	6	2	0	4	136	159	−23	6	Relegation to the 2014–15 Nemzeti Bajnokság I/B
12	Eszterházy KFSC-Globál Safe	6	0	0	6	146	198	−62	1	Relegation to the 2014–15 Nemzeti Bajnokság I/B

Pld - Played; W - Won; L - Lost; PF - Points for; PA - Points against; Diff - Difference; Pts - Points.

=== Results ===
In the table below the home teams are listed on the left and the away teams along the top.

	Debreceni VSC	Eszterházy KFSC	MTK Budapest KC	Veszprém Barabás KC
Debrecen		34–26	32–26	31–21
Eszterházy KFSC	33–41		18–23	23–37
MTK Budapest	25–31	24–22		16–27
Veszprémi Barabás	25–26	39–24	29–22	

== Final standing ==
Rank	Team	Qualification or relegation
1st place, gold medalist(s)	Győri Audi ETO KC (C)	2014–15 EHF Women's Champions League group stage
2nd place, silver medalist(s)	FTC-Rail Cargo Hungária	2014–15 EHF Women's Champions League qualification stage
3rd place, bronze medalist(s)	Érd	2014–15 Women's EHF Cup round 3
4	Dunaújvárosi KA	2014–15 Women's EHF Cup round 3
5	Fehérvár KC	
6	EUbility Group-Békéscsabai Előre NKSE	
7	Siófoki KC-Galerius Fürdő	2014–15 EHF Women's Cup Winners' Cup round 3 ^{1}
8	Ipress Center-Vác	
9	DVSC-TVP	
10	Veszprémi Barabás-Duna Takarék ^{2}	
11	MTK-Budapest ^{3}	
12	Eszterházy KFSC-Globál Safe (R)	Relegation to the 2014–15 Nemzeti Bajnokság I/B

(C) = Champion; (R) = Relegated; (P) = Promoted; (E) = Eliminated; (O) = Play-off winner; (A) = Advances to a further round.

^{1} Since 2013–14 Magyar Kupa both finalists Győri Audi ETO KC and FTC-Rail Cargo Hungaria qualified for the 2014–15 EHF Champions League Group Phase and Qualification Round, the EHF Cup Winners' Cup spot was passed to cup third Siófoki KC-Galerius Fürdő.

^{2} Veszprémi Barabás-Duna Takarék withdrew from all competitions and ceased its operation during the summer of 2014. Their place was taken by Mosonmagyaróvár handball team competing under the name Mosonmagyaróvári KCSE.

^{3} Following 2013–14 Nemzeti Bajnokság I/B Western Group champions Szekszárdi FGKC have declined the promotion due to financial reasons, MTK-Budapest maintained its top division membership.
