= 2008–09 Nemzeti Bajnokság I (women's handball) =

- League: Nemzeti Bajnokság I
- Sport: Team handball
- Duration: 5 September 2008 – 31 May 2009

Regular season
- Season champions: Győri ETO KC
- Top scorer: (Hungary) Anett Sopronyi (184)

Playoffs
- NB I champions: Győri ETO KC
- NB I runners-up: Ferencvárosi TC

Nemzeti Bajnokság I seasons
- ← 2007–08 2009–10 →

The 2009–10 Nemzeti Bajnokság I was the fifty-eighth series of the national team handball championship for Hungarian women. The defending champions were Győri ETO KC and they managed to defend their title after winning the playoffs with five victories and only one draw. The regular season began on September 5, 2008 and ended on March 28, 2009. The playoff round finished on May 31, with Alba Fehérvár KC beating Hódmezővásárhelyi NKC for the fifth place.

== Overview ==
=== Teams ===
Locations of the 2008–09 Nemzeti Bajnokság I teams

The club of Budapest Óbudai Goldberger SE was the only relegated team last season and was replaced by PTE-PEAC from Pécs.

This year's first division championship was geographically pretty well divided : the league gathered two teams from the capital city Budapest (Vasas and FTC), two other from the Northern Great Plain (DVSC and Nyíradony) and Central Transdanubia (Dunaferr and Alcoa), three from the Southern Great Plain (ASA-Consolis-HNKC, Kisunhalas and PTE-PEAC), and finally one from Central Hungary (Vác) and Western Transdanubia (Győr).

After a regular season of 22 matchdays, teams are divided into three groups of four depending on their position. First four teams compete for the title, next four play the 5-8 Classification Round and finally, last four placed clubs play to escape the relegation. In those playoffs, the clubs play in a round-robin system in which points were given according to their position in the regular season.

As Hungarian champions, Győri ETO KC entered the Group Phase of the 2008–09 EHF Women's Champions League. Anita Görbicz's team made a brilliant performance and qualified for the final against Danish Viborg HK but lose by one goal at total score. The runners-up of last season, Dunaferr NK played a qualification tournament but finished second of their group and didn't make it to the next round. Therefore, they were reversed in the EHF Cup. DVSC-Aquaticum entered the third round of the 2008–09 EHF Women's Cup Winners' Cup, won against Italian Pallamano Bancole but was eliminated by Romanian Oțelul Galați. In the EHF Cup, three teams represented Hungary : Dunaferr NK (from the CL), Budapest Bank-FTC-RightPhone and Fehérép Alcoa FKC. First was eliminated in Round 3, the others in the eight-finals. Consequently, only Győri Audi ETO KC played a European Cup's final this season.

=== Arenas and locations ===
Team	Location	County	Arena	Capacity
ASA-Consolis-HNKC	Hódmezővásárhely	Csongrád	Balogh Imsi Sportcsarnok	500
DVSC-Aquaticum	Debrecen	Hajdú-Bihar	Hódos Imre Sportcsarnok	1,800
Dunaferr NK	Dunaújváros	Fejér	Városi Sportcsarnok	1,200
Fehérép Alcoa FKC	Székesfehérvár	Fejér	Köfém Sportcsarnok	1,000
FTC-Rail Cargo Hungaria	Ferencváros, Budapest	Budapest	Elek Gyula Aréna	1,300
Győri Audi ETO KC	Győr	Győr-Moson-Sopron	Magvassy Mihály Sportcsarnok	2,800
Kiskunhalas NKSE-Bravotel	Kiskunhalas	Bács-Kiskun	Általános Művelődési Központ	500
Pikker-PTE-PEAC	Pécs	Baranya	Lauber Dezső Sportcsarnok	3,000
SONEPAR Békéscsabai ENKSE	Békéscsaba	Békés	Városi Sportcsarnok	2,300
Tajtavill-Nyíradony	Nyíradony	Hajdú-Bihar	Harangi Imre Sportcsarnok	1,000
Vasas SC	Angyalföld, Budapest	Budapest	Vasas Sportcsarnok	1,500
Váci NKSE	Vác	Pest	Városi Sportcsarnok	800

== Regular season ==
=== Results ===
Home \ Away	BÉK	DEB	DUN	FKC	FTC	GYŐ	HÓD	KIS	NYÍ	PTE	VSC	VÁC
SONEPAR Békéscsabai ENKSE		20–22	23–24	23–22	26–26	23–33	23–22	18–16	31–26	30–20	24–18	33–20
DVSC-Aquaticum	27–23		30–25	31–27	35–29	24–22	39–27	46–19	36–27	37–21	37–19	33–27
Dunaferr NK	22–29	29–33		31–38	34–31	31–36	26–42	32–22	31–35	22–21	46–27	36–25
Fehérép Alcoa FKC	20–27	28–24	33–20		29–23	28–30	30–24	31–21	32–28	43–22	36–20	32–19
Budapest Bank-FTC-RightPhone	31–24	33–30	41–19	32–29		35–34	31–29	36–31	44–38	47–26	39–25	40–32
Győri Audi ETO KC	26–23	37–24	37–22	33–26	45–37		35–15	35–20	42–22	38–13	42–20	34–25
ASA-Consolis-HNKC	24–21	27–29	33–30	22–23	37–29	24–29		29–21	25–22	41–23	36–31	29–25
Kiskunhalas NKSE-Bravotel	24–24	19–33	19–23	23–20	30–29	23–28	20–23		31–24	30–23	27–26	25–21
Tajtavill-Nyíradony	24–27	30–31	31–33	30–25	33–38	25–39	24–24	26–17		31–23	32–25	32–28
Pikker-PTE-PEAC	15–23	20–30	26–33	25–32	21–38	20–25	20–28	16–30	20–34		27–17	33–29
Vasas SC	18–33	17–36	25–31	24–31	26–31	17–39	27–39	19–22	24–35	32–31		20–32
Váci NKSE	23–22	29–29	40–29	32–31	32–39	25–27	28–25	21–20	28–30	25–14	33–30	

Legend: Blue = home team win; Yellow = draw; Red = away team win.

=== League table ===
Pos	Team	Pld	W	D	L	GF	GA	GD	Pts	Qualification
1	Győri Audi ETO KC	22	20	0	2	756	522	+234	40	Qualified for the Play-off Round
2	DVSC-Aquaticum	22	18	1	3	696	555	+141	37	Qualified for the Play-off Round
3	Budapest Bank-FTC-RightPhone	22	15	1	6	759	665	+94	31	Qualified for the Play-off Round
4	SONEPAR Békéscsabai ENKSE	22	12	2	8	550	503	+47	26	Qualified for the Play-off Round
5	Fehérép Alcoa FKC	22	13	0	9	646	564	+82	26	Qualified for the Classification Round 5–8
6	ASA-Consolis-HNKC	22	12	1	9	625	586	+39	25	Qualified for the Classification Round 5–8
7	Dunaferr NK	22	10	0	12	629	677	−48	20	Qualified for the Classification Round 5–8
8	Tajtavill-Nyíradony	22	9	1	12	639	654	−15	19	Qualified for the Classification Round 5–8
9	Kiskunhalas NKSE-Bravotel	22	8	1	13	510	583	−73	17	Qualified for the Classification Round 9–12
10	Váci NKSE	22	8	1	13	599	643	−44	17	Qualified for the Classification Round 9–12
11	Pikker-PTE-PEAC	22	2	0	20	480	705	−225	4	Qualified for the Classification Round 9–12
12	Vasas SC	22	1	0	21	507	739	−232	2	Qualified for the Classification Round 9–12

=== Individual statistics ===
==== Top scorers ====
Rank	Player	Club	Matches	Goals
1	(Hungary) Anett Sopronyi	Tajtavill-Nyíradony	22	184
2	(Hungary) Zita Szucsánszki	Budapest Bank-FTC-RightPhone	22	176
3	(Hungary) Szandra Zácsik	Budapest Bank-FTC-RightPhone	22	164
4	(Russia) Kristina Trishchuk	Fehérép Alcoa FKC	21	147
5	(Hungary) Beáta Balog	Vasas SC	21	140
6	(Hungary) Piroska Szamoránsky	Budapest Bank-FTC-RightPhone	22	122
7	(Ukraine) Olha Nikolayenko	ASA-Consolis-HNKC	22	111
8	(Hungary) Tamara Tilinger	Dunaferr NK	22	109
8	(Hungary) Judit Veszeli	Váci NKSE	22	109
10	(Hungary) Adrienn Orbán	Váci NKSE	22	107

=== Team statistics ===
==== Overall ====
- Most wins – Győri Audi ETO KC (20)
- Fewest wins – Vasas SC (1)
- Most losses – Vasas SC (21)
- Fewest losses – Győri Audi ETO KC (2)
- Most goals scored – Budapest Bank-FTC-RightPhone (759)
- Fewest goals scored – Pikker-PTE-PEAC (480)
- Most goals conceded – Vasas SC (739)
- Fewest goals conceded – SONEPAR Békéscsabai ENKSE (503)
- Best goal difference – Győri Audi ETO KC (+234)
- Worst goal difference – Vasas SC (–232)

==== Home ====
- Most wins – Győri Audi ETO KC, DVSC-Aquaticum and Budapest Bank-FTC-RightPhone (11)
- Fewest wins – Vasas SC (1)
- Most losses – Vasas SC (10)
- Fewest losses – Győri Audi ETO KC, DVSC-Aquaticum and Budapest Bank-FTC-RightPhone (0)

==== Away ====
- Most wins – Győri Audi ETO KC (9)
- Fewest wins – Pikker-PTE-PEAC and Vasas SC (0)
- Most losses – Pikker-PTE-PEAC and Vasas SC (11)
- Fewest losses – Győri Audi ETO KC (2)

==== Scoring ====
- Widest winning margin: 27 goals –
  - DVSC-Aquaticum 46–19 Kiskunhalas NKSE-Bravotel (23 January 2009)
- Most goals in a match: 82 goals –
  - Budapest Bank-FTC-RightPhone 44–38 Tajtavill-Nyíradony (13 September 2008)
  - Győri Audi ETO KC 45–37 Budapest Bank-FTC-RightPhone (28 September 2008)
- Fewest goals in a match: 34 goals –
  - SONEPAR Békéscsabai ENKSE 18–16 Kiskunhalas NKSE-Bravotel (19 September 2008)
- Most goals scored by losing team: 38 goals –
  - Budapest Bank-FTC-RightPhone 44–38 Tajtavill-Nyíradony (13 September 2008)
- Most goals scored in a match by one player: 16 goals –
  - Zita Szucsánszki for Budapest Bank-FTC-RightPhone against Tajtavill-Nyíradony (13 September 2008)

== Postseason ==
Teams finished in bottom four positions after the regular season enter the classification round for 9–12 places, where a double round-robin system is used. In addition, they are given bonus points depending on their final position in the regular season: Ninth placed Kiskunhalas got four points, tenth placed Vác received three points, PTE-PEAC got two points and finally, last placed Vasas SC was awarded only one point. Clubs with the two lowest combined points get relegated.

=== Classification round 9–12 ===
==== Results ====
Home \ Away	KIS	PTE	VSC	VÁC
Kiskunhalas NKSE		32–21	38–24	25–27
Pikker-PTE-PEAC	24–25		20–26	24–24
Vasas SC	24–35	28–31		23–31
Váci NKSE	35–27	27–26	41–27	

Legend: Blue = home team win; Yellow = draw; Red = away team win.

==== Table ====
Pos	Team	Pld	W	D	L	GF	GA	GD	BP	Pts
1	Váci NKSE	6	5	1	0	185	152	+33	3	14
2	Kiskunhalas NKSE-Bravotel	6	4	0	2	173	155	+18	4	12
3	Pikker-PTE-PTEAC	6	1	1	4	146	153	−7	2	5
4	Vasas SC	6	1	0	5	152	196	−44	1	3

Additional points that were awarded after the final positions in the regular season are indicated in the bonus column.

=== Classification round 5–8 ===
The system is the same as for the precedent playoffs.

==== Results ====
Home \ Away	DUN	FKC	HÓD	NYÍ
Dunaferr NK		19–39	22–29	20–33
Fehérép Alcoa FKC	40–25		27–24	31–29
ASA-Consolis-HNKC	45–27	31–30		29–20
Tajtavill-Nyíradony	47–21	23–23	30–30	

Legend: Blue = home team win; Yellow = draw; Red = away team win.

==== Table ====
Pos	Team	Pld	W	D	L	GF	GA	GD	BP	Pts
1	Fehérép Alcoa FKC	6	4	1	1	190	151	+39	4	13
2	ASA-Consolis-HNKC	6	4	1	1	188	156	+32	3	12
3	Tajtavill-Nyíradony	6	2	2	2	182	154	+28	1	7
4	Dunaferr NK	6	0	0	6	134	233	−99	2	2

Additional points that were awarded after the final positions in the regular season are indicated in bonus points column.

=== Classification round 1–4 ===
First four placed teams of the regular season entered the playoffs for the title. After a round-robin system, best placed team was designed champion. This year, Győri Audi ETO KC won the championship with five victories and one draw.

==== Results ====
Home \ Away	BÉK	DEB	FTC	GYŐ
SONEPAR Békéscsabai ENKSE		23–27	22–25	26–30
DVSC-Aquaticum	23–28		31–29	23–34
Budapest Bank-FTC-RightPhone	30–28	30–25		28–28
Győri Audi ETO KC	27–26	27–25	34–13	

Legend: Blue = home team win; Yellow = draw; Red = away team win.

==== Table ====
Pos	Team	Pld	W	D	L	GF	GA	GD	BP	Pts
1	Győri Audi ETO KC	6	5	1	0	180	141	+39	4	15
2	Budapest Bank-FTC-RightPhone	6	3	1	2	155	168	−13	2	9
3	DVSC-Aquaticum	6	2	0	4	154	171	−17	3	7
4	SONEPAR Békéscsabai ENKSE	6	1	0	5	153	162	−9	1	3

Additional points that were awarded after the final positions in the regular season are indicated in bonus points column.

== Final standing ==
Rank	Team	Qualification or relegation
1	Győri Audi ETO KC	2009–10 EHF Champions League Group stage
2	Budapest Bank-FTC-RightPhone	2009–10 EHF Champions League Second qualifying round
3	DVSC-Aquaticum	2009–10 EHF Cup Winners' Cup ^{1}
4	SONEPAR Békéscsabai ENKSE	2009–10 EHF Cup
5	Fehérép Alcoa FKC	2009–10 EHF Cup
6	ASA-Consolis-HNKC	
7	Tajtavill-Nyíradony	
8	Dunaferr NK	
9	Váci NKSE	
10	Kiskunhalas NKSE-Bravotel	
11	Pikker-PTE-PEAC	Relegation to the 2009–10 Nemzeti Bajnokság I/B
12	Vasas SC	Relegation to the 2009–10 Nemzeti Bajnokság I/B

^{1} Because Magyar Kupa winner Győri Audi ETO KC qualified for the EHF Champions League via their league position, the EHF Cup Winners' Cup spot was passed to cup second, DVSC-Aquaticum.

2008–09 Nemzeti Bajnokság I champions
Győri Audi ETO KC
Sixth title

Team roster
Eduarda Amorim, Aurelia Brădeanu, Dóra Deáki, Anita Herr, Orsolya Herr, Ágnes Hornyák, Bernadett Horváth, Boglárka Hosszu, Szabina Karnik, Anett Kisfaludy, Viktória Kokas, Anikó Kovacsics, Szabina Mayer, Katarína Mravíková, Viktória Oguntoye, Katalin Pálinger, Gabriela Rotiș, Simona Spiridon, Babett Szalai, Orsolya Szegedi, Patrícia Szölösi, Zsuzsanna Tomori and Orsolya Vérten.
Head coach: Csaba Konkoly.
