= Dunaújvárosi Kohász KA =

Hungarian handball team

- Full name: Dunaújvárosi Kohász Kézilabda Akadémia
- Nickname(s): Újváros, Kohász
- Short name: DKKA
- Founded: 2011; 15 years ago
- Arena: Dunaújvárosi Sportcsarnok, Dunaújváros
- Capacity: 1,200
- Club colours
Home	Away

Dunaújvárosi Kohász KA or DKKA (in English: Dunaújvárosi Kohász Handball Academy), formerly known as Dunaferr, is a Hungarian professional women's handball club from Dunaújváros, that plays in the Nemzeti Bajnokság I.

Location of Dunaújvárosi KKA

== History ==
=== Dunaferr ===
The team enjoyed their best spell between the mid-1990s and the mid-2000s, during which period they won five Hungarian championship and five Hungarian Cup titles, and set a unique record of winning all three major continental competitions. Kohász, as the fans call the club, first won the EHF Cup Winners' Cup in 1995 and captured the EHF Cup title three years later.

In 1999 they lifted the EHF Champions League trophy as well, after beating Slovenian side Krim Ljubljana in the finals. Dunaferr, playing in front of their fanatic fans, had secured a two goal advantage for the rematch, which ended in a 26–26 draw, and that was just enough for the Hungarians to celebrate a famous success. To make the silverware collection complete, they also took the EHF Champions Trophy in that year.

=== Dunaújvárosi Kohász KA ===
Following the decision of the Dunaújváros City Council on 28 October 2010, Bojana Radulovics has been named to manage the women's section of the newly forming handball academy, which is set to open in September 2011 and will run in co-operation with the College of Dunaújváros. The Academy is operated by Dunaújvárosi Főiskola – Dunaújvárosi Kézilabda Akadémia Nonprofit Kft. (DF-DKA). In the autumn of 2011 Eszter Mátéfi joined the staff. Dunaferr NKSE could not undertake the operation of the NB I adult team longer, so it was a real danger that professional handball in Dunaújváros would totally disappear. The DF-DKA announced that it will take over the senior team and enter it in the NB I/B championship. The Hungarian Handball Federation did not support this, but the club has offered the 12th place in the first division. The team started the 2012/2013 season as Dunaújvárosi Kohász Kézilabda Akadémia.

In the 2025/2026 season, the team struggled with severe financial problems, and as a result, essentially the entire squad left during the season. The remainder of the season was played with youth players. In 2026, the team was relegated from the first division.

== Crest, colours, supporters ==
=== Naming history ===
- 1979–1989: Dunaújvárosi Kohász SE
- 1989–2004: Dunaferr SE
- 2004–2009: Dunaferr NK
- 2009–2010: Dunaújvárosi NKKSE
- 2010–2012: Dunaújvárosi Regale Klíma
- 2012–present: Dunaújvárosi Kohász Kézilabda Akadémia

=== Club crest ===
Dunaújvárosi Kohász Kézilabda Akadémia
(2012–present)

=== Kit manufacturers and Shirt sponsor ===
The following table shows in detail Dunaújváros kit manufacturers and shirt sponsors by year:

Period	Kit manufacturer	Shirt sponsor
2004–2005	Nike	Dunaferr / Astra Zeneca / Westel / Wu2
2005–2006	Hummel	Dunaferr / Astra Zeneca / T-Mobile / Elco Group
2006–2007	Hummel	Dunaferr / Astra Zeneca / T-Mobile
2007–2008	Hummel	Dunaferr / Astra Zeneca / Raiffeisen Bank
2008–2009	Hummel	Dunaferr / Astra Zeneca
2009–2010	Erima	Dunafin / Dunaújvárosi Vagyonkezelő Zrt. / Duna Mount 2003 Kft.
2010–2011	Erima	Dunafin / Dunaújvárosi Vagyonkezelő Zrt. / Hamburger Hungária Kft.
2011–2012	Erima	Dunafin / Dunaújvárosi Vagyonkezelő Zrt.
2012–2013	Erima	Dunaferr / Dunaújvárosi Főiskola
2013–2014	Hummel	–
2014–2015	Hummel	Vertikál Zrt.
2015–2016	Hummel	Szerencsejáték Zrt. / Vertikál Zrt. / S-Group Zrt. / Fritz Borház
2016–2022	Hummel	Szerencsejáték Zrt. / Bige Holding Csoport / Vertikál Zrt. / Fritz Borház
2022–	Erima	

=== Kits ===
HOME
2004–05	2016–18	2018–19	2019–20	2020–22	2022–23	2023–

AWAY
2004–05	2016–18	2018–19	2019–20	2020–22	2022–23

THIRD
2016–17	2018–19	2019–20	2020–

== Supporters and rivalries ==
The supporters of the club are based in Dunaújváros, in western part and capital of Fejér County, Hungary.

Dunaújvárosi Kohász KA's rival is the neighbouring club Fehérvár KC and games between the clubs are considered as the "Fejér megyei derbi".

== Honours ==
=== Domestic competitions ===
Nemzeti Bajnokság I (National Championship of Hungary)

- Champions (5): 1997–98, 1998–99, 2000–01, 2002–03, 2003–04
- Runners-up (4): 1996–97, 2001–02, 2004–05, 2007–08
- Third place (4): 1995–96, 1999–00, 2005–06, 2006–07

Magyar Kupa (National Cup of Hungary)

- Winners (5): 1997–98, 1998–99, 1999–00, 2001–02, 2003–04
- Finalists (4): 1993–94, 2002–03, 2004–05, 2007–08

=== European competitions ===
EHF Champions League:

- Winners: 1999
- Semifinalists: 2004, 2005

EHF Cup Winners' Cup:

- Winners: 1995

EHF Cup

- Winners: 1998, 2016
- Finalists: 2003
- Semifinalists: 2008

EHF Champions Trophy:

- Winners: 1999
- Third Placed: 1998
- Fourth Placed: 1995

== Arena ==
- Name: Dunaújvárosi Sportcsarnok
- City: Dunaújváros, Hungary
- Capacity: 1,200 spectators
- Address: H-2400 Dunaújváros, Eszperantó út 2–4.

== Retired numbers ==
Dunaújvárosi Kohász KA retired numbers
N°	Nationality	Player	Position	Tenure
2	(Hungary)	Bernadett Ferling	Centre Back	1995–2015
6	(Hungary)	Erzsébet Kocsis	Line Player	1989–1999, 2009
9	(Hungary)	Bojana Radulovics	Right Back	1995–2006, 2009–2011
20	(Hungary)	Anita Bulath	Left Back	2000–2006, 2014–2018, 2020–2022
22	(Hungary)	Anita Kulcsár posthumous honor	Line Player	2004–2005

== Previous Squads ==
2017–2018 Team
Shirt No	Nationality	Player	Birth Date	Position
4	Hungary	Orsolya Monori	3 July 1997 (age 29)	Left Back
7	Hungary	Petra Mihály	4 January 2001 (age 25)	Right Winger
8	Hungary	Zsuzsanna Nagy	7 May 1999 (age 27)	Left Back
10	Hungary	Dusmáta Takács	15 November 1986 (age 39)	Line Player
11	Hungary	Luca Dombi	17 November 1995 (age 30)	Line Player
13	Hungary	Babett Szalai	21 February 1990 (age 36)	Central Back
16	Hungary	Kyra Csapó	2 December 1993 (age 32)	Goalkeeper
17	Croatia	Ćamila Mičijević	8 September 1994 (age 31)	Left Back
18	Hungary	Vivien Grosch	17 April 1997 (age 29)	Right Winger
19	Hungary	Luca Szekerczés	18 June 1994 (age 32)	Right Back
20	Hungary	Anita Bulath	20 September 1983 (age 42)	Left Back
21	Hungary	Katrin Klujber	21 April 1999 (age 27)	Right Back
25	Hungary	Fruzsina Bouti	28 July 1996 (age 30)	Central Back
27	Serbia	Katarina Tomasevic	6 February 1984 (age 42)	Goalkeeper
33	Hungary	Anna Kovács	24 October 1991 (age 34)	Right Back
34	Hungary	Anita Kazai	28 May 1988 (age 38)	Left Winger
38	Hungary	Anita Cifra	6 August 1989 (age 37)	Line Player
39	Hungary	Dóra Kemény	2 April 1997 (age 29)	Left Back
40	Hungary	Beatrix Molnár	15 October 1996 (age 29)	Central Back
42	Hungary	Laura Csenge Braun	9 July 2000 (age 26)	Left Winger
90	HungarySlovakia	Viktória Oguntoye	24 December 1990 (age 35)	Goalkeeper
95	Hungary	Viktória Nick	12 January 1995 (age 31)	Line player
99	Hungary	Ramóna Vártok	11 October 1999 (age 26)	Goalkeeper

2015–2016 Team
Shirt No	Nationality	Player	Birth Date	Position
4	Hungary	Vanessza Hajtai	3 October 1995 (age 30)	Left Winger
5	HungaryRussia	Krisztina Triscsuk	17 July 1985 (age 41)	Left Back
7	Hungary	Fruzsina Dávid-Azari	29 June 1989 (age 37)	Right Winger
10	Hungary	Dusmáta Takács	15 November 1986 (age 39)	Line Player
13	Hungary	Babett Szalai	21 February 1990 (age 36)	Central Back
16	Hungary	Ágnes Triffa	18 January 1987 (age 39)	Goalkeeper
19	Hungary	Melinda Vincze	12 November 1983 (age 42)	Left Winger
20	Hungary	Anita Bulath	20 September 1983 (age 42)	Left Back
21	Hungary	Katrin Klujber	21 April 1999 (age 27)	Right Back
23	Hungary	Rita Termány	1 January 1995 (age 31)	Left Back
25	Hungary	Boglárka Hanusz	12 September 1995 (age 30)	Central Back
29	Hungary	Olívia Kamper	7 June 1985 (age 41)	Central Back
31	Hungary	Bianka Takács	29 August 1992 (age 33)	Line Player
33	Hungary	Anna Kovács	24 October 1991 (age 34)	Right Back
34	Hungary	Fruzsina Ferenczy	2 July 1996 (age 30)	Central Back
40	Hungary	Beatrix Molnár	15 October 1996 (age 29)	Central Back
49	Hungary	Krisztina Kovács	1 November 1996 (age 29)	Left Back
77	Hungary	Panna Gindeli	27 July 1996 (age 30)	Line Player
81	Hungary	Bernadett Horváth	10 May 1990 (age 36)	Line Player
89	Hungary	Éva Nagy	13 March 1994 (age 32)	Goalkeeper
90	HungarySlovakia	Viktória Oguntoye	24 December 1990 (age 35)	Goalkeeper
95	Hungary	Viktória Nick	12 January 1995 (age 31)	Left Back

2007–2008 Team
Shirt No	Nationality	Player	Birth Date	Position
1	Hungary	Kitti Hoffmann	6 October 1985 (age 40)	Goalkeeper
2	Hungary	Bernadett Ferling	13 July 1977 (age 49)	Central Back
3	Hungary	Barbara Balogh	22 October 1985 (age 40)	Line Player
4	Hungary	Ildikó Erdősi	14 September 1989 (age 36)	Left Winger
5	Hungary	Eszter Gábor	29 October 1988 (age 37)	Left Back
9	Hungary	Tamara Tilinger	14 February 1989 (age 37)	Central Back
10	Hungary	Krisztina Pigniczki	18 September 1975 (age 50)	Central Back
11	Hungary	Zsuzsanna Lovász	17 December 1976 (age 49)	Right Winger
12	Romania	Paula Ungureanu	30 March 1980 (age 46)	Goalkeeper
13	Hungary	Anett Sopronyi	27 November 1986 (age 39)	Right Back
14	Hungary	Eszter Laluska	14 April 1986 (age 40)	Left Back
18	Hungary	Gabriella Gáspár	19 May 1979 (age 47)	Central Back
19	Hungary	Melinda Vincze	12 November 1983 (age 42)	Left Winger
26	Hungary	Rita Borbás	21 December 1980 (age 45)	Line Player
28	Hungary	Melinda Berta	28 January 1981 (age 45)	Right Winger
59	Croatia	Sanela Knezović	22 December 1979 (age 46)	Goalkeeper
77	Hungary	Renáta Mörtel	12 October 1983 (age 42)	Left Back

2003–2004 Team
Shirt No	Nationality	Player	Birth Date	Position
1	Hungary	Katalin Pálinger	6 December 1978 (age 47)	Goalkeeper
2	Hungary	Bernadett Ferling	13 July 1977 (age 49)	Central Back
3	Hungary	Zsanett Borbély	9 January 1978 (age 48)	Line Player
4	Hungary	Anita Oblisz	9 December 1970 (age 55)	Left Back
5	Hungary	Zsuzsanna Pálffy	26 December 1970 (age 55)	Right Winger
9	Hungary	Bojana Radulovics	23 March 1973 (age 53)	Right Back
10	Hungary	Krisztina Pigniczki	18 September 1975 (age 50)	Central Back
11	Hungary	Zsuzsanna Lovász	17 December 1976 (age 49)	Right Winger
13	Hungary	Gabriella Kindl	15 September 1979 (age 46)	Left Back
15	Hungary	Beáta Bohus	25 April 1971 (age 55)	Line Player
16	Romania	Mihaela Cracana-Blaga	7 July 1971 (age 55)	Goalkeeper
17	Hungary	Ivett Nagy	28 June 1982 (age 44)	Left Winger
18	Hungary	Gabriella Gáspár	19 May 1979 (age 47)	Central Back
19	Hungary	Melinda Vincze	12 November 1983 (age 42)	Left Winger
20	Hungary	Anita Bulath	20 September 1983 (age 42)	Left Back
22	Hungary	Anita Kulcsár	2 October 1976 (age 49)	Line Player

2002–2003 Team
Shirt No	Nationality	Player	Birth Date	Position
1	Hungary	Katalin Pálinger	6 December 1978 (age 47)	Goalkeeper
2	Hungary	Bernadett Ferling	13 July 1977 (age 49)	Central Back
3	Hungary	Zsanett Borbély	9 January 1978 (age 48)	Line Player
4	Hungary	Anita Oblisz	9 December 1970 (age 55)	Left Back
5	Hungary	Zsuzsanna Pálffy	26 December 1970 (age 55)	Right Winger
7	Hungary	Ágnes Turtóczki	27 November 1980 (age 45)	Right Winger
8	Hungary	Hortenzia Szrnka	28 May 1981 (age 45)	Left Back
10	Hungary	Krisztina Pigniczki	18 September 1975 (age 50)	Central Back
11	Hungary	Erika Sávolt	11 June 1972 (age 54)	Left Winger
13	Hungary	Gabriella Kindl	15 September 1979 (age 46)	Left Back
14	Hungary	Rita Borók	28 July 1973 (age 53)	Right Back
15	Hungary	Beáta Bohus	25 April 1971 (age 55)	Line Player
16	Romania	Mihaela Cracana-Blaga	7 July 1971 (age 55)	Goalkeeper
17	Hungary	Ivett Nagy	28 June 1982 (age 44)	Left Winger
18	Hungary	Gabriella Gáspár	19 May 1979 (age 47)	Central Back
19	Hungary	Melinda Vincze	12 November 1983 (age 42)	Left Winger
20	Hungary	Anita Bulath	20 September 1983 (age 42)	Left Back

== Recent seasons ==
As of 23 August 2020.

- Seasons in Nemzeti Bajnokság I: 41
- Seasons in Nemzeti Bajnokság I/B: 4
- Seasons in Nemzeti Bajnokság II: 8

Season	Division	Pos.	Magyar kupa
1993–94	NB I	4th	Finalist
1994–95	NB I	4th	Semi-finals
1995–96	NB I	Third place	Semi-finals
1996–97	NB I	Runner-up	Semi-finals
1997–98	NB I	Champion	Winner
1998–99	NB I	Champion	Winner
1999-00	NB I	Third place	Winner
2000–01	NB I	Champion	Semi-finals
2001–02	NB I	Runner-up	Winner
2002–03	NB I	Champion	Finalist

Season	Division	Pos.	Magyar kupa
2003–04	NB I	Champion	Winner
2004–05	NB I	Runner-up	Finalist
2005–06	NB I	Third place	Quarter-finals
2006–07	NB I	Third place	Semi-finals
2007–08	NB I	Runner-up	Finalist
2008–09	NB I	8th	Round 4
2009–10	NB I	6th	Quarter-finals
2010–11	NB I	7th	Quarter-finals
2011–12	NB I	10th	Round 4
2012–13	NB I	8th	Round 4

Season	Division	Pos.	Magyar kupa
2013–14	NB I	4th	Quarter-finals
2014–15	NB I	4th	Quarter-finals
2015–16	NB I	5th	Round 4
2016–17	NB I	4th	Fourth place
2017–18	NB I	4th	Round 4
2018–19	NB I	9th	Fourth place
2019–20	NB I	Cancelled	
2020–21	NB I		

=== In European competition ===
- Participations in Champions League: 8x
- Participations in EHF Cup: 10x
- Participations in Cup Winners' Cup: 5x

Season	Competition	Round	Club	Home	Away	Aggregate
2018–19	EHF Cup	Qual. Round 2	(Switzerland) Spono Eagles	43–14	35–21	78–35
2018–19	EHF Cup	Qual. Round 3	(Spain) Bera Bera	18–26	23–22	41–48

== Notable former players ==
Goalkeepers

- (Hungary) Andrea Farkas
- (Hungary) Viktória Oguntoye
- (Hungary) Katalin Pálinger
- (Hungary) Anikó Meksz
- (Hungary) Ágnes Triffa
- (Hungary) Vivien Víg
- (Hungary) Irina Sirina
- (Hungary) Krisztina Kerner
- (Hungary) Erzsébet Baranyi
- (Hungary) Kitti Hoffmann
- (Romania) Paula Ungureanu
- (Romania) Mihaela Blaga
- (Croatia) Sanela Knezović
- (Croatia) Gabrijela Bartulović
- (Croatia) Željana Stojak
- (Slovakia) Marianna Gubova
- (Serbia) Katarina Tomasevic
- (Montenegro) Anastasija Babović

Right wings

- (Hungary) Beatrix Balogh
- (Hungary) Zsuzsanna Pálffy
- (Hungary) Bernadett Bódi
- (Hungary) Rita Meggyes
- (Hungary) Zsuzsanna Lovász
- (Hungary) Vivien Grosch
- (Hungary) Fruzsina Dávid-Azari
- (Hungary) Enikő Tóth
- (Hungary) Petra Slakta
- (Hungary) Krisztina Tamás
- (Hungary) Ágnes Turtóczky
- (Hungary) Irén Mezőségi
- (Hungary) Melinda Berta
- (Hungary) Angéla Kovács

Right backs

- (Hungary) Bojana Radulovics
- (Hungary) Helga Németh
- (Hungary) Rita Borók
- (Hungary) Ibolya Mehlmann
- (Hungary) Nikolett Brigovácz
- (Hungary) Anett Sopronyi
- (Hungary) Luca Szekerczés
- (Hungary) Szabina Karnik
- (Hungary) Klára Gát
- (Hungary) Szimonetta Gera
- (Hungary) Anna Kovács
- (Hungary) Katrin Klujber
- (Slovenia) Dominika Mrmolja
- (Poland) Małgorzata Trawczyńska
- (Serbia) Jelena Terzić

Line players

- (Hungary) Beáta Bohus
- (Hungary) Erzsébet Kocsis
- (Hungary) Anita Kulcsár
- (Hungary) Rita Borbás
- (Hungary) Anita Cifra
- (Hungary) Barbara Balogh
- (Hungary) Bernadett Horváth
- (Hungary) Dusmáta Takács
- (Hungary) Tímea Rádl
- (Hungary) Barbara Sári
- (Hungary) Szederke Sirián
- (Hungary) Luca Dombi
- (Hungary) Zsanett Borbély
- (Hungary) Bianka Takács
- (Hungary) Zsuzsanna Szarka
- (Hungary) Viktória Nick
- (Ukraine) Tatiana Sologub
- (Montenegro) Itana Čavlović
- (North Macedonia) Sanja Dabevska
- (Germany) Saskia Weisheitel
- (Poland) Daria Somionka
- (Croatia) Elena Popovic

Playmakers

- (Hungary) Bernadett Ferling
- (Hungary) Olívia Kamper
- (Hungary) Krisztina Pigniczki
- (Hungary) Beáta Siti
- (Hungary) Edit Csendes
- (Hungary) Tamara Tilinger
- (Hungary) Kitti Kudor
- (Hungary) Renáta Gerstmár
- (Hungary) Nóra Jókai
- (Hungary) Gabriella Gáspár
- (Hungary) Fruzsina Takács
- (Hungary) Babett Szalai
- (Netherlands) Daphne Luchies

Left backs

- (Hungary) Anita Bulath
- (Hungary) Eszter Mátéfi
- (Hungary) Judit Simics
- (Hungary) Rita Deli
- (Hungary) Kinga Klivinyi
- (Hungary) Gabriella Kindl
- (Hungary) Ágnes Farkas
- (Hungary) Hortenzia Szrnka
- (Hungary) Auguszta Mátyás
- (Hungary) Renáta Mörtel
- (Hungary) Eszter Laluska
- (Hungary) Krisztina Triscsuk
- (Hungary) Vivien Léránt
- (Hungary) Anita Oblisz
- (Hungary) Zsófia Pásztor
- (Hungary) Judit Csíkos
- (Croatia) Ćamila Mičijević
- (Serbia) Svetlana Obućina
- (Serbia) Jovana Jovović
- (Czech Republic) Jana Šustková
- (Ukraine) Alevtyina Melentyeva
- (Portugal) Débora Solange Costa Moreno
- (France) Déborah Kpodar
- (Croatia) Tena Petika
- (Brazil) Kelly Rosa

Left wings

- (Hungary) Ivett Nagy
- (Hungary) Gabriella Takács
- (Hungary) Melinda Rácz-Vincze
- (Hungary) Ildikó Erdősi
- (Hungary) Erika Sávolt
- (Hungary) Krisztina Szádvári
- (Hungary) Anita Kazai
- (Hungary) Éva Erdősi
- (Hungary) Andrea Gaál
- (Lithuania) Jelena Berciuniene

== Coaches ==
- (Hungary) László Sándorfi (1979)
- (Hungary) Béla Herczeg (1983–1985)
- (Hungary) Csaba Árva (1989–1992)
- (Hungary) Ervin Horváth (1992–1993)
- (Hungary) István Pergel (1993–1995)
- (Hungary) Barabás Pánczél (1995–1996)
- (Hungary) András Kajcsa (1980–1982, 1986–1989, 1996–1997)
- (Hungary) Gyula Zsiga (1997–2000)
- (Hungary) Péter Kovács (2006–2007)
- (Hungary) Vilmos Imre (2007–2008)
- (Hungary) Tamás Rapatyi (2008–2010, 2022–2023)
- (Hungary) Szilárd Kiss (2000–2006, 2010–2011)
- (Hungary) Ervin Dankó (2011)
- (Hungary) István Gulyás (2011–2012)
- (Hungary) Eszter Mátéfi (2012–2015)
- (Croatia) Zdravko Zovko (2015–2017)
- (Hungary) László György (2017–2020)
- (Hungary) Attila Vágó (2020–2022)
- (Hungary) Dr. Róbert Paic (2023–2024)
- (Hungary) Péter Gulyás (2024–2025)
- (Hungary) Gábor Zubai (2025–present)

== Dunaújvárosi Kohász KA II ==
Dunaújvárosi Kohász KA II is the junior team of Dunaújvárosi Kohász KA women's handball club. They compete in the Nemzeti Bajnokság I/B, the second-tier league in Hungary. Although they play in the same league system as their senior team, rather than a separate league, they are ineligible for promotion to the Nemzeti Bajnokság I, since junior teams cannot play in the same division as their senior side.
