= Slakta =

Slakta is a surname. Notable people with the surname include:

- Balázs Slakta (born 1994), Hungarian footballer
- Petra Slakta (born 1989), Hungarian handball player
