= Barbara Leibssle-Balogh =

Hungarian handball player (born 1985)

Personal information
- Full name: Barbara Leibssle-Balogh
- Nationality: Hungarian
- Born: 22 October 1985 (age 40) Budapest, Hungary
- Height: 1.86 m (6 ft 1 in)

Sport
- Sport: Handball
- Position: Line Player
- Current club: Retired

Youth career
- Years: Team
- –2002: Vasas SC

Senior clubs
- Years: Team
- 2002–2004: Vasas SC
- 2004–2009: Dunaferr SE
- 2009–2011: Ferencvárosi TC
- 2011–2015: TuS Metzingen
- 2017–2018: TG Nürtingen
National team
Years	Team	Apps	(Gls)
2008–2010	Hungary	17	(15)

Barbara Leibssle-Balogh (born 22 October 1985 in Budapest) is a retired Hungarian handballer.

She started to play handball at the age of seven, and three years later, in 1995, she was signed by Vasas SC. She spent her youth years there, and made her senior debut in 2002. She moved to Dunaferr SE in 2004, where beside playing handball she also studied on the College of Dunaújváros. She signed to Ferencváros in early 2009.

Balogh made her international debut on 14 October 2008 against France. She participated on the European Championship yet in that year, however, up to the present it remained the only major international tournament she was picked for.

== Achievements ==
- Nemzeti Bajnokság I:
  - Silver Medallist: 2005, 2008, 2009
  - Bronze Medallist: 2006, 2007, 2011
- Magyar Kupa:
  - Silver Medallist: 2005, 2010
  - Bronze Medallist: 2007
- EHF Champions League:
  - Semifinalist: 2005
- EHF Cup:
  - Semifinalist: 2008
- EHF Cup Winners' Cup:
  - Winner: 2011
- Youth European Championship:
  - Bronze Medallist: 2003
- World University Championship:
  - Winner: 2010

== Personal life ==
She is married to German handball coach, Mike Leibssle.
