= Dominika Mrmolja =

Slovenian handball player

Personal information
- Nationality: Slovenian
- Born: 28 April 1994 (age 32) Postojna, Slovenia
- Height: 1.80 m (5 ft 11 in)

Sport
- Sport: Handball
- Position: Right back
- Current club: Dunaújvárosi Kohász KA
- Number: 44

Senior clubs
- Years: Team
- 2012–2014: RŽK Zagorje
- 2014–2018: ŽRK Krka
- 2020–2021: ŽRK Ajdovščina
- 2021–2022: Dunaújvárosi Kohász KA
National team
Years	Team	Apps	(Gls)
2021–	Slovenia	2	(0)

Dominika Mrmolja (born 28 April 1994) is a Slovenian handball player for Dunaújvárosi Kohász KA and the Slovenian national team.

She represented Slovenia at the 2021 World Women's Handball Championship in Spain.
