= Hódmezővásárhelyi NKC =

Hungarian handball team

Hódmezővásárhelyi NKC SE
- Short name: HNKC
- Arena: Balogh Imsi Sportcsarnok, Hódmezővásárhely
- League: Nemzeti Bajnokság I (2001–2010)

Hódmezővásárhelyi NKC was a Hungarian professional women's handball club from Hódmezővásárhely, that played in the Nemzeti Bajnokság I. The club was dissolved in 2010.

Location of Hódmezővásárhelyi NKC SE

== History ==
=== Naming history ===
- 2001–2023: Liss-Hódmezővásárhelyi NK
- 2003–2004: Hódmezővásárheliy NK
- 2004–2005: Liss-Hódmezővásárhelyi NK
- 2005–2007: Hódmezővásárhelyi NKC SE
- 2007–2008: ASA Hódmezővásárhelyi NKC
- 2008–2010: ASA-Consolis-Hódmezővásárhelyi NKC

== Arena ==
- Name: Hódtói Sportcsarnok, later Balogh Imre Sportcsarnok
- City: Hódmezővásárhely, Hungary
- Address: 6800 Hódmezővásárhely, Szegfű utca 6.

== Recent seasons ==
- Seasons in Nemzeti Bajnokság I: 9

Season	Division	Pos.	Magyar kupa
2001–02	NB I	6th	
2002–03	NB I	6th	
2003–04	NB I	8th	
2004–05	NB I	7th	
2005–06	NB I	8th	
2006–07	NB I	8th	
2007–08	NB I	6th	
2008–09	NB I	6th	
2009–10	NB I	10th	

== Notable former players ==
Goalkeepers

- (Hungary) Krisztina Szabó
- (Hungary) Beáta Körmöczi
- (Hungary) Andrea Scholtz
- (Hungary) Henrietta Vörös
- (Hungary) Annamária Király
- (Belarus) Elena Abramovich
- (Ukraine) Oksana Ploshchynska

Right wings

- (Hungary) Erika Virág
- (Hungary) Zsuzsanna Mucsi
- (Hungary) Kata Földes
- (Hungary) Zsuzsanna Lovász
- (Hungary) Krisztina Tamás
- (Ukraine) Tetyana Stupakova

Right backs

- (Hungary) Anett Sopronyi
- (Ukraine) Olha Nikolayenko

Line players

- (Hungary) Valéria Szabó
- (Hungary) Adrienn Gaál
- (Hungary) Szabina Mayer
- (Hungary) Dusmáta Takács
- (Hungary) Zsanett Borbély
- (Serbia) Monika Nikolic

Playmakers

- (Hungary) Viktória Kocsik
- (Hungary) Ágnes Kocsis
- (Hungary) Judit Asztalos
- (Hungary) Alexandra Wolf
- (Hungary) Nóra Jókai
- (Hungary) Renáta Gerstmár
- (Hungary) Éva Fauszt
- (Hungary) Kitti Kudor
- (Romania) Daniela Palarie

Left backs

- (Hungary) Beatrix Prok
- (Hungary) Katalin Jenőfi
- (Hungary) Éva Barna
- (Slovakia) Renata Jancarová
- (Slovakia) Alžbeta Polláková
- (Romania) Teodora Bloj

Left wings

- (Hungary) Bernadett Baunok
- (Hungary) Anikó Kósa
- (Hungary) Tímea Ancsin
- (Hungary) Ivett Szepesi
- (Hungary) Viktória Koroknai
- (Hungary) Ivett Nagy

== Coaches ==
- (Hungary) József Farkas (2001–2003; 2008–2009)
- (Hungary) Sándor Tamás (2003–2004)
- (Hungary) Barabás Pánczél (2004–2005)
- (Hungary) Ferenc Buday (2005–2006)
- (Hungary) Szilárd Kiss (2006–2007)
- (Hungary) Tamás Rapatyi (2007–2008)
- (Hungary) Ervin Dankó (2009–2010)
