= Sanela Knezović =

Croatian handball player (born 1979)

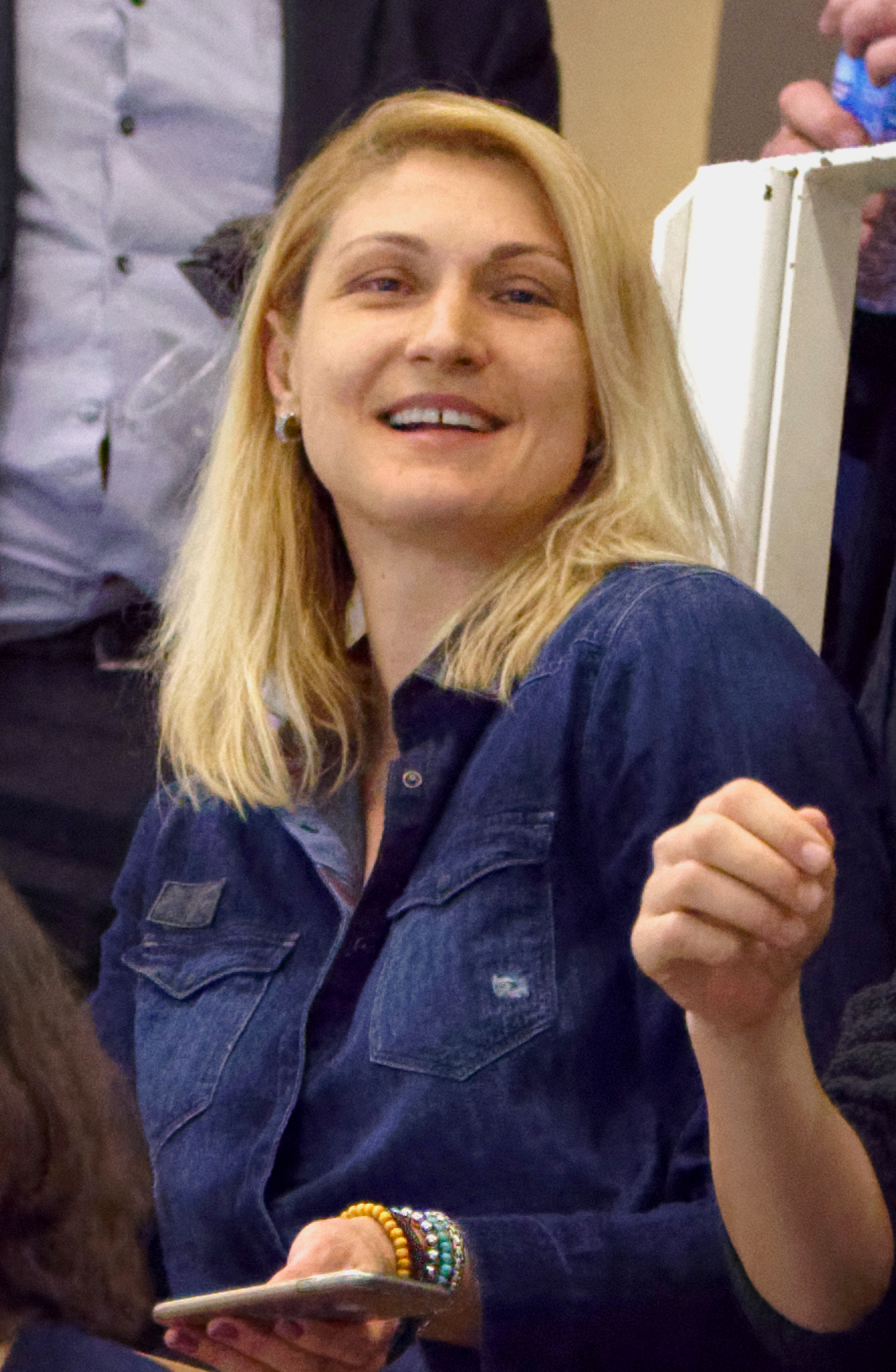

Personal information
- Nationality: Croatian
- Born: 22 December 1979 (age 46) Mostar, SR Bosnia and Herzegovina, SFR Yugoslavia
- Height: 1.84 m (6 ft 0 in)

Sport
- Sport: Handball
- Position: Goalkeeper
- Current club: Retired

Senior clubs
- Years: Team
- 1996-2004: Podravka
- 2004–2007: Budućnost
- 2007-2008: Dunaferr
- 2008-2011: Budućnost
- 2011-2012: CS Oltchim
- 2012: Dunaferr
- 2012–2015: HC Astrakhanochka
National team
- Years: Team
- –: Croatia
- Updated on 1 July 2011

Sanela Knezović (born 22 December 1979) is a Herzegovinian-born Croatian handballer.

== Club career ==
Knezović started to play handball in 1990 in Mostar. Her first coach was Nikola Stipić. Knezović was forced to take a one-year pause from the sport because of the Bosnian War. After the war, she continued to play handball and in 1994 joined Zrinjski Mostar. In 1996 she received the Best Athlete of Bosnia and Herzegovina award. The same year, Knezović signed with European Champions Podravka Vegeta. In eight years of playing for the best Croatian team, Knezović won many Croatian Championship and Croatian Cup trophies. In 2002, she played in EHF Cup finals. Two years after that she joined Montenegrin Champions Budućnost and in 2006 won Cup Winners' Cup trophy. In 2007, she went to Hungarian handball club Dunaferr, but because of the club's financial problems she returned to Budućnost. In 2010 Knezović again won Cup Winners' Cup trophy and in 2011 played in Champions League semi-finals. In the 2011/2012 season Sanela Knezović played for Romanian champions CS Oltchim Râmnicu Vâlcea. After one season in Dunaferr, Sanela moved to HC Astrakhanochka on a three-year contract. She retired from handball in 2015. After retirement, she completed her studies and graduated from Faculty of Kinesiology. She has been in private business ever since.

== Achievements ==
- EHF Champions League:
  - Semifinalist: 2012
- Cup Winners' Cup:
  - Winner: 2006, 2010
- Women's Regional Handball League:
  - Winner: 2010, 2011
  - Silver Medallist: 2009
- Romanian Championship:
  - Winner: 2012
- Hungarian Championship:
  - Silver Medallist: 2008
- Croatian Championship:
  - Winner: 1996, 1997, 1998, 1999, 2000, 2001, 2002, 2003
- Montenegrin Championship:
  - Winner: 2005, 2006, 2007, 2009, 2010, 2011
- Romanian Supercup:
  - Winner: 2011
- Hungarian Cup:
  - Silver Medallist: 2008
- Croatian Cup:
  - Winner: 1996, 1997, 1998, 1999, 2000, 2001, 2002, 2003, 2004
- Montenegrin Cup:
  - Winner: 2005, 2006, 2007, 2009, 2010, 2011

== Individual accomplishments ==
- Best Athlete of Bosnia and Herzegovina: 1996
- Captain of Croatian national team: 2004
