= Ivett Nagy =

Hungarian handball player (born 1982)

Personal information
- Full name: Ivett Nagy
- Nationality: Hungarian
- Born: 28 June 1982 (age 44) Kisvárda, Hungary
- Height: 1.73 m (5 ft 8 in)

Sport
- Sport: Handball
- Position: Left Wing
- Current club: Retired

Senior clubs
- Years: Team
- –1998: Kisvárda SE
- 1998–2007: Dunaújváros
- 2007–2008: DVSC
- 2008–2009: Hódmezővásárhelyi NKC
- 2009–2011: Dunaújváros
- 2011: Veszprém Barabás KC
- 2011–2012: Nantes Loire Atlantique Handball
National team
Years	Team	Apps	(Gls)
2003–2004	Hungary	19	(49)
Medal record
Junior World Championship
Silver medal – second place	2001 Hungary	Team
European Championship
Bronze medal – third place	2004 Hungary	Team

Ivett Nagy (born 28 June 1982 in Kisvárda) is a Hungarian handballer who most recently played for Nantes Loire Atlantique Handball and also has been selected to the Hungarian national team.

She made her international debut on 27 March 2003 against Brazil and participated on the European Championship a year later, winning the bronze medal.

== Achievements ==
- Nemzeti Bajnokság I:
  - Winner: 1999, 2001, 2003, 2004
  - Silver Medallist: 2002, 2005
  - Bronze Medallist: 2000, 2006, 2007
- Magyar Kupa:
  - Winner: 1999, 2000, 2002, 2004
  - Silver Medallist: 2003, 2005
  - Bronze Medallist: 2007, 2008
- EHF Cup:
  - Finalist: 2003

== Personal life ==
She is married, her husband is Kornél Nagy, international handball player. She gave birth to their son, Artúr in 2014 and their daughter, Isabel in 2016. They live in Dunkerque, France.
