= Zsuzsanna Pálffy =

Hungarian handball player (born 1970)

Personal information
- Nationality: Hungarian
- Born: 26 December 1970 (age 55) Vác, Hungary

Sport
- Sport: Handball
- Position: right wing

Senior clubs
- Years: Team
- 1988–1991: FTC
- 1991–1993: Debrecen
- 1993–2005: Dunaferr NK
National team
- Years: Team
- –: Hungary

Zsuzsanna Pálffy (born 26 December 1970) is a retired Hungarian handball player. She participated at the 2004 Summer Olympics, where she placed fifth with the Hungarian national team.
