= Anita Cifra =

Hungarian handballer (born 1989)

Personal information
- Nationality: Hungarian
- Born: 6 August 1989 (age 37) Békés, Hungary
- Height: 1.80 m (5 ft 11 in)

Sport
- Sport: Handball
- Position: Pivot
- Current club: Vasas SC

Senior clubs
- Years: Team
- 2004–2011: Békéscsabai ENKSE
- 2011–2016: Ferencvárosi TC
- 2016–2019: Dunaújváros
- 2019–2021: Vasas SC
National team
| Years | Team | Apps | (Gls) |
| 2009–2013 | Hungary | 20 | (45) |

Anita Cifra (born 6 August 1989 in Békés) is a Hungarian handballer who plays for Vasas SC as a line player. She is also a Hungarian international, having made her debut on 6 March 2009 against Sweden.

== Achievements ==
- Nemzeti Bajnokság I:
  - Winner: 2015
  - Silver Medalist: 2012, 2013, 2014
- Magyar Kupa:
  - Bronze Medalist: 2010
- EHF Cup Winners' Cup:
  - Winner: 2012
