= Itana Čavlović =

Montenegrin handball player (born 1997)

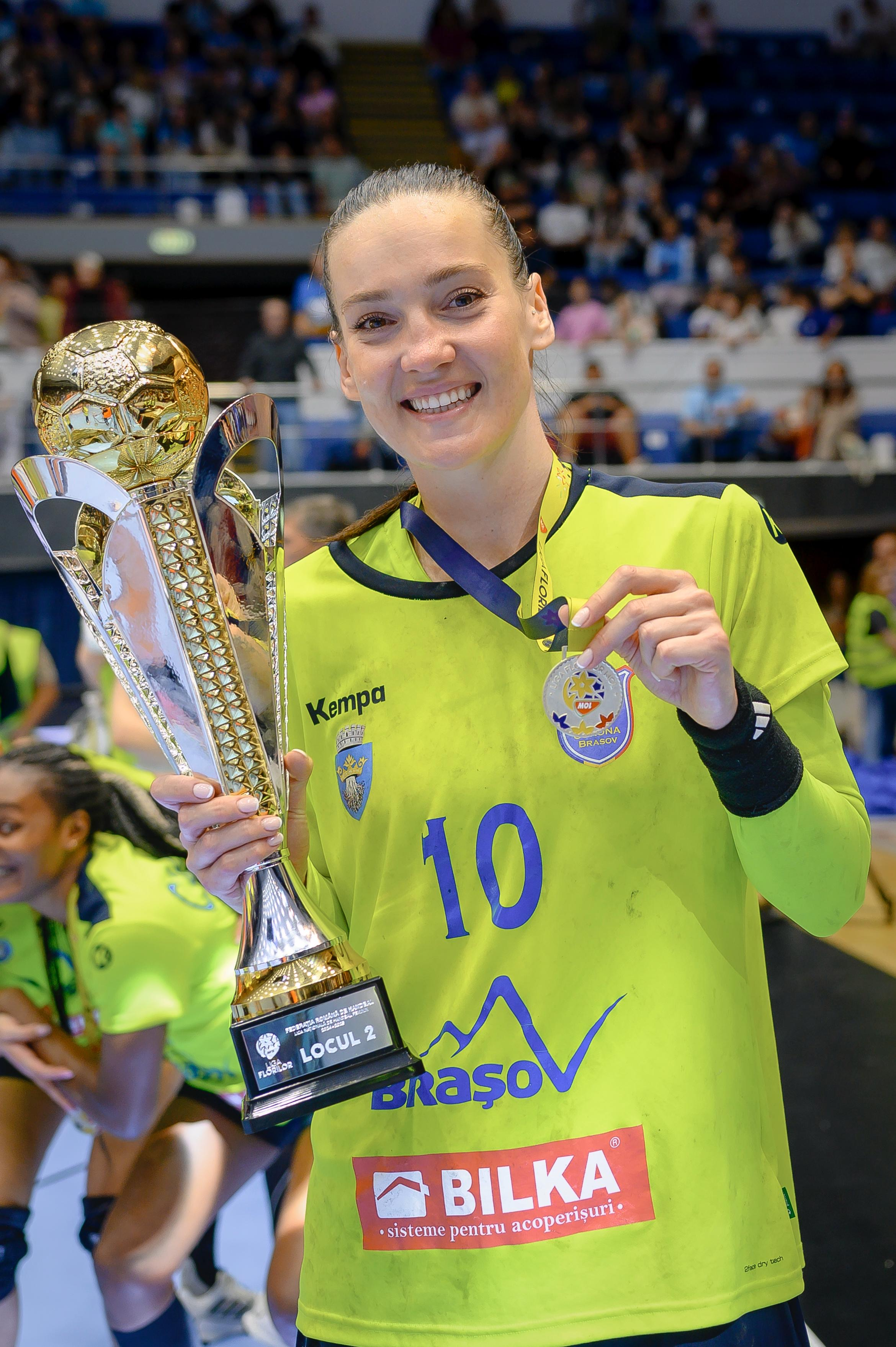
- Čavlović with silver medal Romanian Handball League 2025

Personal information
- Nationality: Montenegrin
- Born: 27 August 1997 (age 29) Podgorica, Montenegro
- Height: 1.88 m (6 ft 2 in)

Sport
- Sport: Handball
- Position: Pivot
- Current club: CS Rapid București (handball)
- Number: 55

Senior clubs
- Years: Team
- 2017: ŽRK Budućnost Podgorica
- 2017-2018: Zağnos SK
- 2018-2019: İzmir Büyükşehir Belediyesi GSK
- 2019-2020: Dunaújvárosi Kohász KA
- 2020-: Rapid
National team
- Years: Team
- –: Montenegro

Itana Čavlović (born 27 August 1997) is a professional Montenegrin handball player who plays as pivot for the club CS Rapid București (handball).
