= Petra Slakta =

Hungarian handball player (born 1989)

Personal information
- Full name: Petra Slakta
- Nationality: Hungarian
- Born: 23 June 1989 (age 37) Heves, Hungary
- Height: 1.71 m (5 ft 7 in)

Sport
- Sport: Handball
- Position: Right Back
- Current club: MTK Budapest
- Number: 15

Youth career
- Years: Team
- –2004: Hevesi SE
- 2004–2007: Dunaújvárosi KKA

Senior clubs
- Years: Team
- 2007–2009: Dunaújvárosi KKA
- 2009–2016: Debreceni VSC
- 2016–: MTK Budapest

Petra Slakta (born 23 June 1989 in Heves) is a Hungarian handballer who plays for MTK Budapest in right back position.

== Achievements ==
- Nemzeti Bajnokság I:
  - Silver Medallist: 2008, 2011
- Magyar Kupa:
  - Silver Medallist: 2008, 2011
- EHF Cup:
  - Semifinalist: 2008
