= Dusmáta Takács =

Hungarian handball player (born 1986)

Personal information
- Full name: Dusmáta Takács
- Nationality: Hungarian
- Born: 15 November 1986 (age 39) Dunaújváros, Hungary
- Height: 1.73 m (5 ft 8 in)

Sport
- Sport: Handball
- Position: Line Player
- Current club: Retired

Senior clubs
- Years: Team
- –2006: Dunaújváros
- 2006–2008: Hódmezővásárhelyi NKC
- loan: → Tamási KC
- 2008–2009: Kiskunhalas NKSE
- 2009–2018: Dunaújváros

Dusmáta Takács (born 15 November 1986 in Dunaújváros) is a former Hungarian handballer.

== Achievements ==
- Magyar Kupa:
  - Bronze Medallist: 2009
