= Fruzsina Takács =

Hungarian handball player (born 1992)

Personal information
- Full name: Fruzsina Takács
- Nationality: Hungarian
- Born: 15 August 1992 (age 34) Dunaújváros, Hungary
- Height: 1.74 m (5 ft 9 in)

Sport
- Sport: Handball
- Position: Left Back
- Current club: Orosházi NKC

Youth career
- Years: Team
- 2005–2008: Dunaújváros

Senior clubs
- Years: Team
- 2008–2014: Dunaújváros
- 2014–2015: Kecskeméti NKSE
- 2015–: Orosházi NKC

Fruzsina Takács (born 15 August 1992 in Dunaújváros) is a Hungarian handballer who currently plays for Orosházi NKC in left back position.
