= Babett Szalai =

Hungarian handball player (born 1990)

Personal information
- Nationality: Hungarian
- Born: 21 February 1990 (age 36) Körmend, Hungary
- Height: 1.75 m (5 ft 9 in)

Sport
- Sport: Handball
- Position: Centre back
National team
Years	Team	Apps	(Gls)
2018–	Hungary	3	(0)

Babett Szalai (born 21 February 1990) is a retired Hungarian handballer for Dunaújvárosi KKA and the Hungarian national team.

Szalai previously played for Győri ETO KC, Debreceni VSC and Siófok KC.

She made her international debut on 1 December 2018 against Netherlands.
