= Krisztina Triscsuk =

Russian-Hungarian handball player (born 1985)

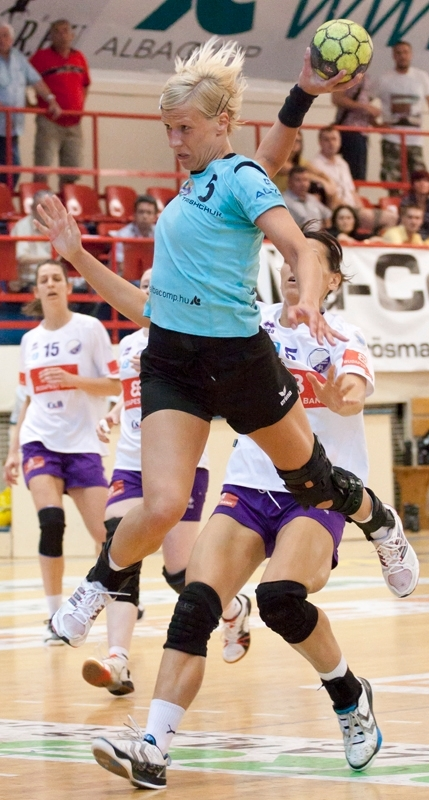

Personal information
- Nationality: Russian; Hungarian
- Born: 17 July 1985 (age 41) Boksitogorsk, Russia
- Height: 1.76 m (5 ft 9 in)

Sport
- Sport: Handball
- Position: Left back

Senior clubs
- Years: Team
- –2004: (Russia) KSK Luch Moscow
- 2004–2005: (Hungary) Veszprém BKC
- 2005–2013: (Hungary) Alba Fehérvár KC
- 2013–2014: (Hungary) Érd NK
- 2014–2016: (Hungary) Dunaújvárosi KKA
- 2016–2017: (Hungary) Siófok KC
- 2017–2018: (Hungary) Kisvárdai KC
- 2018–2019: (Germany) Thüringer HC
- 2019–2020: (Hungary) Dunaújvárosi KKA
- 2020–2022: (Hungary) Alba Fehérvár KC
National team
Years	Team	Apps	(Gls)
2012–2016	Hungary	53	(140)
Medal record
European Championship
Bronze medal – third place	2012 Serbia

Krisztina Triscsuk (Hungarian: [ˈkristinɒ ˈtriʃt͡ʃuk]; Russian: Кристина Трищук, romanized: Kristina Trishchuk; born 17 July 1985) is a retired Russian-Hungarian handballer for Alba Fehérvár KC.

Since January 2024 she has been the sporting director at Alba Fehérvár KC.

== Club career ==
Triscsuk played until 2004 for the Russian team KSK Luch Moscow. She then joined Veszprém BKC for a season, before joining Alba Fehérvár KC.

On 14 May 2011, in her sixth season by Fehérvár KC, she surpassed Beatrix Balogh's all-time league scoring record, who hit the back of the net 643 times while playing for the Székesfehérvár-based club. Triscsuk entered the court against Veszprém with only one goal short to the previous record and managed thirteen goals, thus becoming the new league topscorer of Fehérvár.

In 2013 she joined Érd NK. A season later she joined Dunaújvárosi KKA. Here she won the 2016 EHF Cup. She then joined Siófok KC.

In 2017 she joined Kisvárdai KC for a season, before joining German Thüringer HC in 2018 to replace the injured Beate Scheffknecht. In 2019 she returned to Dunaújvárosi. A year later she joined Alba Fehérvár KC.

She retired after the 2021–22 season.

== International ==
As a youngster, Triscsuk played alongside Emiliya Turey, Lyudmila Postnova and Yekaterina Andryushina in the Russian youth national teams, however, she never made a full international appearance. Since 2004 Triscsuk has lived in Hungary and in October 2012 she obtained Hungarian citizenship. On 10 December 2012 she was called up to the Hungarian squad for the 2012 European Women's Handball Championship as a replacement for Melinda Vincze. Triscsuk made her debut a day later against Romania in a 25–19 victory, with that Hungary secured its place in the semi-finals of the European Championship.

== Personal life ==
Her husband was Evgeny Lushnikov, former handball player of Veszprém.

== Achievements ==
- European Championship:
  - Bronze Medalist: 2012
- Magyar Kupa:
  - Silver Medallist: 2006
  - Bronze Medallist: 2011
- EHF Cup
  - Winner: 2016

== Individual awards ==
- Nemzeti Bajnokság I Topscorer: 2010/11, 2016/17
