= University of Dunaújváros =

University

Coordinates: 46.9606°N 18.9339°E

- Dunaújvárosi Egyetem
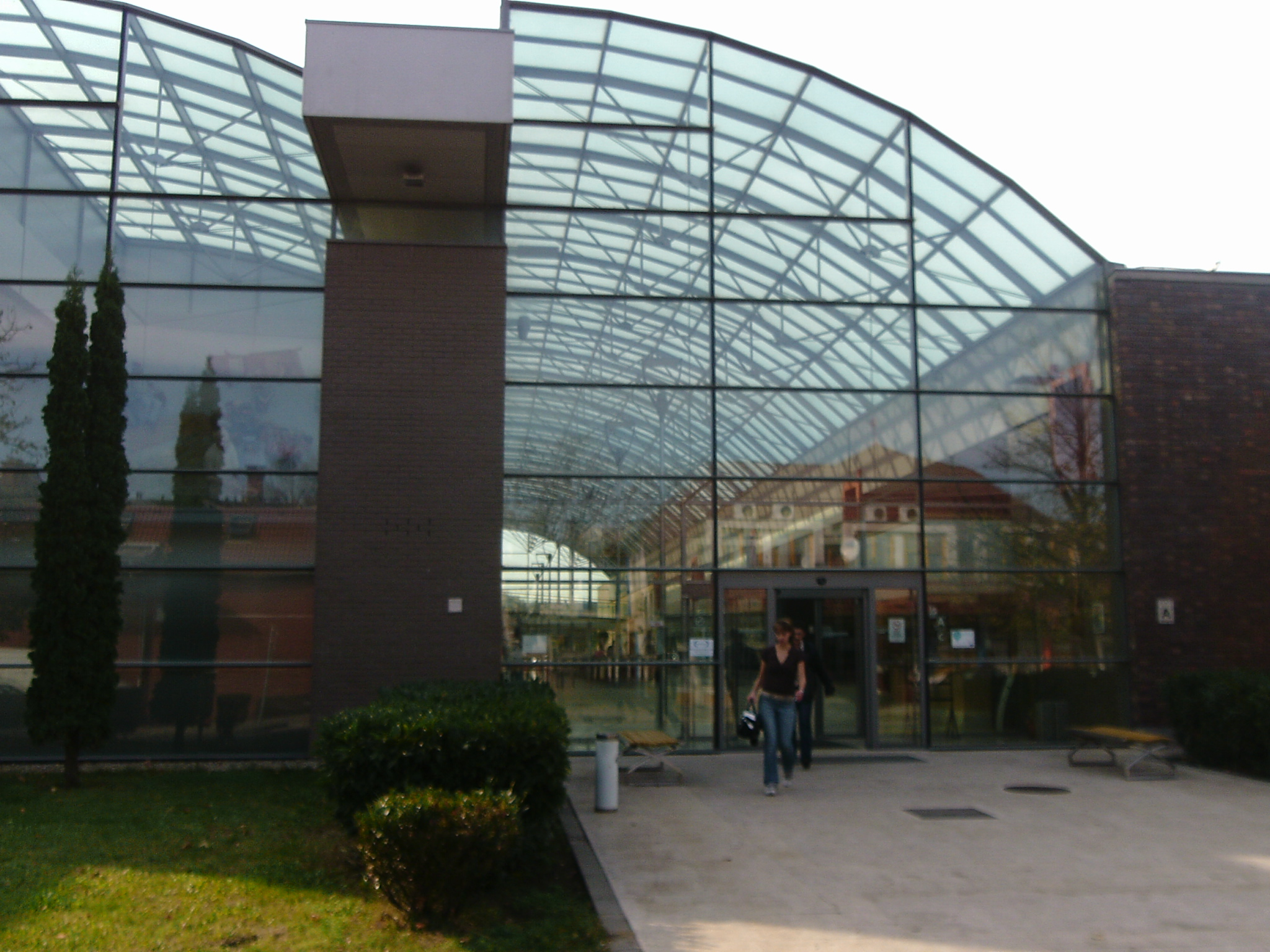
- Type: Public university
- Location: Dunaújváros, Hungary
- Campus: Urban
- Website: About US, about University of Dunaújváros

University of Dunaújváros (before 2016: College of Dunaújváros) is located in Hungary. Education center in Dunaújváros offers bachelor course Computer Engineer BSc, Engineering Business Management BSc, Communication and Media BA, Business Administration BA, Material Engineering BSc, Mechanical Engineer BSc, and master course Teacher of Engineering degrees.
