= Bernadett Ferling =

Hungarian handball player (born 1977)

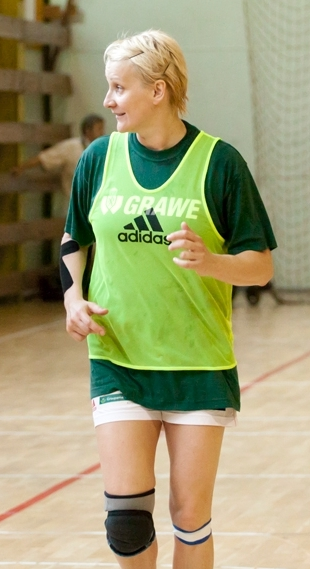
- Ferling in 2011

Personal information
- Full name: Bernadett Ferling
- Nationality: Hungarian
- Born: 13 July 1977 (age 49) Tatabánya, Hungary
- Height: 180 cm (71 in)

Sport
- Sport: Handball
- Position: Middle Back, Playmaker
- Current club: Dunaújváros
- Number: 2

Senior clubs
- Years: Team
- –1994: Tatabányai SC
- 1994–1995: Testnevelési Főiskola SE
- 1995–2015: Dunaújváros
National team
Years	Team	Apps	(Gls)
2000–2015	Hungary	150	(342)
Medal record
Representing Hungary
World Championship
Silver medal – second place	2003 Croatia	Team
Bronze medal – third place	2005 Russia	Team
European Championship
Bronze medal – third place	2004 Hungary	Team
- Updated on 28.08.2015

Bernadett Ferling (born 13 July 1977) is a former Hungarian handball player who played for Dunaújvárosi NKS and the Hungarian national team. Between 2009 and 2011, she also served as the club president of Dunaújváros. Currently she works as a fitness coach at Dunaújvárosi NKS.

== Career ==
=== Club ===
Born to a sporting family, her mother is a former handball player while her father is a retired footballer. Moved to Dunaújváros as an unknown teenager, but thanks to her outstanding performances she quickly became a beloved player by the fans.

She played a big part of the club's success story, in which Dunaújváros transformed into one of the best and most feared clubs in Europe. They regularly reached the latest stage of the continental competitions, winning their first title, namely the EHF Cup in 1998 after a double victory over HC Banská Bystrica in the finals. Ferling took the Hungarian league and cup gold that year as well, which was followed by another four domestic championship and cup success until 2004.

Next year the Danube-side team entered the EHF Champions League and there was nothing that could prevent them from lifting the most prestigious European trophy. They irresistibly marched through the quarterfinals and semifinals, beating Ikast and Hypo Niederösterreich en route, to face Krim Ljubljana in the finals. Dunaújváros secured a two-goal advantage on the first leg and achieved a 26–26 draw in Slovenia, which was just enough to win the title. Later that year Ferling also collected the EHF Champions Trophy.

From the mid-2000s, because of their worsening financial situation and parallelly the strengthening of the rivals, Dunaújváros slowly lost their dominant position and eventually hit rock bottom in 2009, when they could not fulfil payments and most of their players left. To save the team from cessation, a new, fully independent board took over the club, led by Ferling, who has taken the presidential role, joined by other loyal players such as Erzsébet Kocsis, who was voted IHF World Player of the Year in 1995, and long-serving playmaker Gabriella Gáspár. She retired in 2015. She played for Dunaújváros for 20 years.

=== International ===
She made her international debut on 22 November 2000. She has become a regular member of the Hungarian national team for 2002, but due to a recurrent injury she was unable to participate on the European Championship that year.

In 2003, she took part on the World Championship in Croatia, where Hungary won the silver medal. She added another two medals to her success list, after winning bronze both on the 2004 European Championship and the 2005 World Championship.

She competed at the 2004 Summer Olympics in Athens, and finished fifth with the Hungarian team. She played at the 2008 Summer Olympics in Beijing, where the Hungarian team finished fourth, after losing 20–22 to Russia in the semifinal, and 28–33 to South Korea in the bronze medal match.

== Personal life ==
In 2003 Ferling married the ice hockey player László Orsó. In September 2008 it was revealed that she is pregnant, and as a result she stayed away from handball for the rest of the season. On 5 May 2009 she gave birth to a girl, named Virág. Ferling played her first competitive match after her maternity leave on 6 September 2009 against Siófok KC.

== Achievements ==
- Nemzeti Bajnokság I:
  - Winner: 1998, 1999, 2001, 2003, 2004
  - Silver Medallist: 2000, 2002, 2005
  - Bronze Medallist: 2006, 2007
- Magyar Kupa:
  - Winner: 1998, 1999, 2000, 2002, 2004
  - Finalist: 2005
- EHF Champions League:
  - Winner: 1999
  - Semifinalist: 2004, 2005
- EHF Cup:
  - Winner: 1998
  - Finalist: 2003
  - Semifinalist: 2008
- EHF Champions Trophy:
  - Winner: 1999
