= Viktória Oguntoye =

Slovak handball player (born 1990)

Personal information
- Full name: Viktória Oguntoye
- Nationality: Slovak
- Born: 24 December 1990 (age 35) Štúrovo, Czechoslovakia
- Height: 1.82 m (6 ft 0 in)

Sport
- Sport: Handball
- Position: Goalkeeper
- Current club: Debreceni VSC
- Number: 90

Senior clubs
- Years: Team
- 2007–2015: Győri ETO KC
- loan: → Érd NK
- loan: → Érd NK
- 2015–2018: Dunaújvárosi KKA
- 2018–2020: Debreceni VSC
- 2020–2022: HC Dac
- 2022–2025: Dunaújvárosi KKA

Viktória Oguntoye (born 24 December 1990) is a Slovak handball goalkeeper of Hungarian and Nigerian descent, who currently plays for Debreceni VSC. She also won several cups for the Hungarian junior national team. She acquired Hungarian citizenship and planned to play for the Hungarian nation team, but Viktória eventually represents Slovakia women's national team Slovakia women's national handball team in Qualification for 2020 European Women's Handball Championship 2020 European Women's Handball Championship.

== Achievements ==
- Nemzeti Bajnokság I:
  - Winner: 2008, 2009, 2010
- Magyar Kupa:
  - Winner: 2008, 2009, 2010
- EHF Champions League:
  - Finalist: 2009
