= Melinda Vincze =

Hungarian handball player (born 1983)

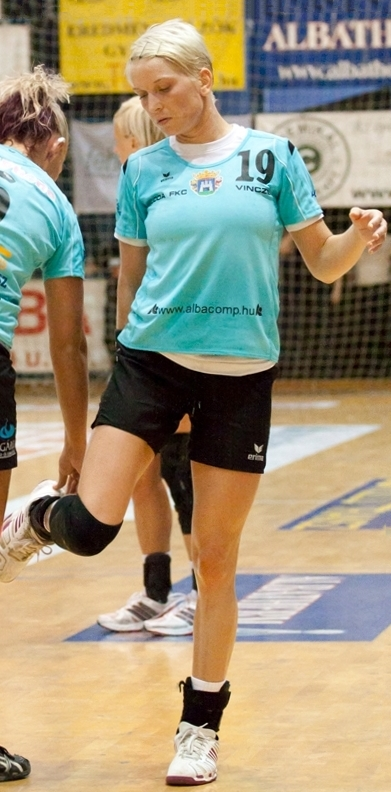
- Vincze in 2011

Personal information
- Nationality: Hungarian
- Born: 12 November 1983 (age 42) Kiskőrös, Hungary
- Height: 174 cm (69 in)

Sport
- Sport: Handball
- Position: Left wing
- Current club: Retired

Senior clubs
- Years: Team
- –2001: Kiskőrösi KC
- 2001–2009: Dunaferr
- 2009–2011: Alcoa FKC
- 2011–2014: Érdi VSE
- 2014–2017: Dunaújvárosi KKA
National team
Years	Team	Apps	(Gls)
2007–2013	Hungary	69	(96)
Medal record
European Championship
Bronze medal – third place	2012 Serbia	Team

Melinda Vincze (born 12 November 1983) is a Hungarian former handballer who played for Dunaújvárosi KKA and the Hungarian national team.

She made her international debut on 3 March 2007 against Norway.

== Achievements ==
- Nemzeti Bajnokság I:
  - Winner: 2003, 2004
  - Silver medalist: 2005, 2008
  - Bronze medalist: 2006, 2007
- Magyar Kupa:
  - Silver medalist: 2008
  - Bronze medalist: 2007, 2011
- European Championship:
  - Bronze medalist: 2012
