= Anita Bulath =

Hungarian handballer (born 1983)

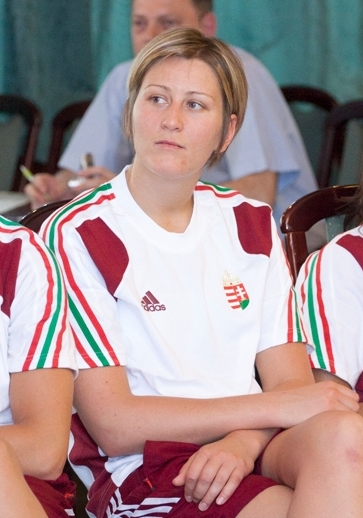
- Anita Bulath in 2011

Personal information
- Nationality: Hungarian
- Born: 20 September 1983 (age 43) Dunaújváros, Hungary
- Height: 177 cm (70 in)

Sport
- Sport: Handball
- Position: Left back
- Current club: DKKA

Youth career
- Years: Team
- –1998: Győri ETO KC
- 1998–2000: Dunaújvárosi KKA

Senior clubs
- Years: Team
- 2000–2006: Dunaújvárosi KKA
- 2006–2007: FCK Håndbold
- 2007–2009: Podravka Koprivnica
- 2009–2011: Debreceni VSC
- 2011–2012: Veszprém Barabás KC
- 2012–2013: Viborg HK
- 2014–2018: Dunaújvárosi KKA
- 2018–2020: Debreceni VSC
- 2020–2022: Dunaújvárosi KKA
National team
Years	Team	Apps	(Gls)
2004–2015	Hungary	106	(239)
Medal record
European Championship
Bronze medal – third place	2012 Serbia
Junior World Championship
Silver medal – second place	2001 Hungary
Silver medal – second place	2003 Macedonia

Anita Bulath (born 20 September 1983) is a former Hungarian handballer.

== Career ==
=== Club ===
She learned the basics of handball on the famous youth academy of Győri ETO KC, but she did not make any appearances for the team and in 1998 she was eventually transferred to Dunaferr. She made her senior debut in her new team in 2000, and won all possible domestic competitions during her spell at the club (3 championship, 2 cup titles). Her excellent performances caught the eyes of many major clubs and finally FCK Håndbold managed to secure her services. However, she left the club after just one season to join Zdravko Zovko-led Podravka Koprivnica.

She became an important member of her new club, having achieved back-to-back triumphs both in the Croatian Championship and Croatian Cup in 2008 and 2009. They also enjoyed a good run in EHF Cup Winners' Cup in 2008, where they only got knocked out in the semifinals by Larvik HK, which went to win the title that year. In August 2009, Podravka announced that due to the growing financial troubles of the club they cannot allow the high salaries, and they decided to release all foreigner players from the club to cut the wage bills.

Bulath found her new home in Debrecen and quickly established herself as a key player. She played an important role in the 2010–11 EHF Champions League campaign, when Debreceni VSC reached the group stage of the competition for the first time in the club's history.

=== International ===
She made her international debut on 2 March 2004, however she has not been selected for a major tournament until the 2008 European Championship. Since then she is a regular member of the team, having played on the 2009 World Championship and being the second best scorer of Hungary on the 2010 European Championship

== Achievements ==
- Nemzeti Bajnokság I:
  - Winner: 2001, 2003, 2004
  - Silver Medallist: 2010, 2011
- Magyar Kupa:
  - Winner: 2002, 2004
  - Silver Medallist: 2011
- Croatian Championship:
  - Winner: 2008, 2009
- Croatian Cup:
  - Winner: 2008, 2009
- EHF Cup
  - Winner: 2016
- Junior World Championship:
  - Silver Medallist: 2001, 2003
- Junior European Championship
  - Silver Medallist: 2002
- European Championship:
  - Bronze Medalist: 2012
