= Olha Nikolayenko =

Ukrainian handball player

Personal information
- Nationality: Ukrainian
- Born: 5 April 1983 (age 43) Kherson, Ukraine
- Height: 1.78 m (5 ft 10 in)

Sport
- Sport: Handball
- Position: Right back

Senior clubs
- Years: Team
- –2004: HC Dnepryanka Kherson
- 2004–2009: Hódmezővásárhelyi NKC
- 2009–2011: Békéscsabai ENKSE
- 2011–2012: CJF Fleury Loiret HB
- 2012–2016: Békéscsabai ENKSE
- 2016–2017: MTK Budapest
- 2017–2018: Kecskeméti NKSE
National team
Years	Team	Apps	(Gls)
–	Ukraine	43	(170)

Olha Nikolayenko (born 5 April 1983) is a Ukrainian handballer who plays for the Ukrainian national team.

She was listed among the top ten goalscorers at the 2009 World Women's Handball Championship in China, with 53 goals.

== Achievements ==
- Magyar Kupa:
  - Bronze Medalist: 2010
