= Gabriella Gáspár =

Hungarian handball player (born 1979)

Personal information
- Full name: Gabriella Gáspár
- Nationality: Hungarian
- Born: 19 May 1979 (age 47) Veszprém, Hungary
- Height: 1.73 m (5 ft 8 in)

Sport
- Sport: Handball
- Position: Playmaker
- Current club: retired

Senior clubs
- Years: Team
- 1998–2013: Dunaújváros
- 1999–2000: → Kiskőrösi KC (loan)
National team
- Years: Team
- –: Hungary

Gabriella Gáspár (born 19 May 1979, in Veszprém) is a Hungarian former handballer.

Her husband was Roland Szuna, former ice hockey player.

== Achievements ==
- Nemzeti Bajnokság I:
  - Winner: 1999, 2001, 2003, 2004
  - Silver Medallist: 2000, 2002, 2005
  - Bronze Medallist: 2006, 2007
- Magyar Kupa:
  - Winner: 1999, 2000, 2002, 2004
  - Finalist: 2005
- EHF Champions League:
  - Winner: 1999
  - Semifinalist: 2004, 2005
- EHF Cup:
  - Finalist: 2003
  - Semifinalist: 2008
- EHF Champions Trophy:
  - Winner: 1999
