= Tamara Tilinger =

Hungarian handball player (born 1989)

Personal information
- Full name: Tamara Tilinger
- Nationality: Hungarian
- Born: 14 February 1989 (age 37) Székesfehérvár, Hungary
- Height: 1.74 m (5 ft 9 in)

Sport
- Sport: Handball
- Position: Middle Back, Playmaker
- Number: 9

Senior clubs
- Years: Team
- until 2007: Alba Fehérvár KC
- 2007–2009: Dunaújvárosi KKA
- 2009–2017: Alba Fehérvár KC
- 2017–2020: Mosonmagyaróvári KC SE
National team
Years	Team	Apps	(Gls)
2010	Hungary	3	(1)

Tamara Tilinger (born 14 February 1989 in Székesfehérvár) is a retired Hungarian handballer who played for Cornexi Alcoa, Dunaferr NK and Mosonmagyaróvári KC SE during her career.

She made her international debut on 30 May 2010 against Azerbaijan.

== Achievements ==
- Nemzeti Bajnokság I:
  - Silver Medallist: 2008
- Nemzeti Bajnokság I/B:
  - Winner: 2018
- Magyar Kupa:
  - Silver Medallist: 2008
  - Bronze Medallist: 2011
- EHF Cup:
  - Semifinalist: 2008
- World University Championship:
  - Winner: 2010
