= 2010–11 EHF Women's Champions League =

Tournament details
- Dates: 3 September 2010 – 14 May 2011
- Teams: 31 (qualification stage); 16 (group stage); 8 (main round); 4 (knockout stage)

Final positions
- Champions: (Norway) Larvik HK
- Runners-up: (Spain) SD Itxako

Tournament statistics
- Top scorer: (Norway) Heidi Løke (99)

The EHF Women's Champions League 2010–11 is the 18th edition of the EHF Women's Champions League, a handball competition for top women's clubs of Europe managed by the European Handball Federation.

Larvik HK won the title for the first time after defeating SD Itxako 47–46 on aggregate in the final.

== Participants ==
- (Austria) Hypo Niederösterreich
- (Croatia) HC Podravka Vegeta
- (Denmark) Viborg HK
- (Spain) Itxako Reyno de Navarra
- (France) Toulon St-Cyr Var Handball
- (Germany) HC Leipzig
- (Hungary) Győri Audi ETO KC
- (Montenegro) ŽRK Budućnost Podgorica
- (Norway) Larvik HK
- (Romania) CS Oltchim Râmnicu Vâlcea
- (Russia) Dinamo Volgograd
- (Slovenia) RK Krim Ljubljana
- (Denmark) Randers HK
- (Russia) Zvezda Zvenigorod
- (Sweden) IK Sävehof
- (Hungary) DVSC - Korvex

== Qualifying rounds ==
The draw for both tournaments took place on 13 July 2010 in Vienna. The rights to organize and host the group matches were also decided in this draw.

=== Qualification tournament 1 ===
The qualification tournament 1 was hosted by IK Sävehof in Gothenburg, Sweden. IK Sävehof and T+A/VOC Amsterdam advanced to the second Qualification Tournament. Gil Eanes/Lagos and LK Zug entered the EHF Cup at Round 2.

Team	Pld	W	D	L	GF	GA	GD	Pts
(Sweden) IK Sävehof	3	3	0	0	102	56	+46	6
(Netherlands) T+A/VOC Amsterdam	3	2	0	1	88	92	−4	4
(Portugal) Gil Eanes/Lagos	3	1	0	2	86	85	+1	2
(Switzerland) LK Zug	3	0	0	3	58	101	−43	0

3 September 2010; 17:30	Gil Eanes/Lagos (Portugal)	33–35	(Netherlands) T+A/VOC Amsterdam	Partillebohallen, Gothenburg; Attendance: 100; Referees: Brehmer, Skowronek (Poland)
3 September 2010; 17:30	Seabra 9	(12–20)	Abdoelhafiezkhan, Goos 6	Partillebohallen, Gothenburg; Attendance: 100; Referees: Brehmer, Skowronek (Poland)
3 September 2010; 17:30	3× (yellow card) 2× (suspension)	Report	2× (yellow card) 5× (suspension)	Partillebohallen, Gothenburg; Attendance: 100; Referees: Brehmer, Skowronek (Poland)

3 September 2010; 19:30	LK Zug (Switzerland)	12–39	(Sweden) IK Sävehof	Partillebohallen, Gothenburg; Attendance: 550; Referees: Guseva, Vartanyan (Russia)
3 September 2010; 19:30	Schwander 4	(4–20)	three players 5	Partillebohallen, Gothenburg; Attendance: 550; Referees: Guseva, Vartanyan (Russia)
3 September 2010; 19:30	3× (yellow card) 3× (suspension)	Report	2× (yellow card) 2× (suspension)	Partillebohallen, Gothenburg; Attendance: 550; Referees: Guseva, Vartanyan (Russia)

4 September 2010; 15:00	IK Sävehof (Sweden)	30–21	(Portugal) Gil Eanes/Lagos	Partillebohallen, Gothenburg; Attendance: 250; Referees: Brehmer, Skowronek (Poland)
4 September 2010; 15:00	Fogelström, Isaksson 5	(18–7)	Afonseca 9	Partillebohallen, Gothenburg; Attendance: 250; Referees: Brehmer, Skowronek (Poland)
4 September 2010; 15:00	3× (yellow card) 3× (suspension)	Report	3× (yellow card) 4× (suspension)	Partillebohallen, Gothenburg; Attendance: 250; Referees: Brehmer, Skowronek (Poland)

4 September 2010; 17:00	T+A/VOC Amsterdam (Netherlands)	30–26	(Switzerland) LK Zug	Partillebohallen, Gothenburg; Attendance: 50; Referees: Guseva, Vartanyan (Russia)
4 September 2010; 17:00	Bont, Hofman 6	(19–13)	Cavallari, Wälti 5	Partillebohallen, Gothenburg; Attendance: 50; Referees: Guseva, Vartanyan (Russia)
4 September 2010; 17:00	3× (yellow card) 8× (suspension) 1× (red card)	Report	3× (yellow card) 8× (suspension)	Partillebohallen, Gothenburg; Attendance: 50; Referees: Guseva, Vartanyan (Russia)

5 September 2010; 12:00	Gil Eanes/Lagos (Portugal)	32–20	(Switzerland) LK Zug	Partillebohallen, Gothenburg; Attendance: 50; Referees: Guseva, Vartanyan (Russia)
5 September 2010; 12:00	Pina 9	(15–8)	Stücheli 5	Partillebohallen, Gothenburg; Attendance: 50; Referees: Guseva, Vartanyan (Russia)
5 September 2010; 12:00	3× (yellow card) 1× (suspension)	Report	3× (yellow card) 3× (suspension)	Partillebohallen, Gothenburg; Attendance: 50; Referees: Guseva, Vartanyan (Russia)

5 September 2010; 14:00	T+A/VOC Amsterdam (Netherlands)	22–33	(Sweden) IK Sävehof	Partillebohallen, Gothenburg; Attendance: 400; Referees: Brehmer, Skowronek (Poland)
5 September 2010; 14:00	Helgesen, Hofman 5	(11–16)	three players 6	Partillebohallen, Gothenburg; Attendance: 400; Referees: Brehmer, Skowronek (Poland)
5 September 2010; 14:00	3× (yellow card) 8× (suspension)	Report	3× (yellow card) 5× (suspension)	Partillebohallen, Gothenburg; Attendance: 400; Referees: Brehmer, Skowronek (Poland)

=== Qualification tournament 2 ===
Sixteen teams were divided into four groups of four teams each. Twelve losers of the qualification tournament 2 entered the EHF Cup at Round 3. The first placed team of each group advanced to the Group Matches.

==== Group 1 ====
Hosted by Randers HK in Randers, Denmark.

Team	Pld	W	D	L	GF	GA	GD	Pts
(Denmark) Randers HK	3	3	0	0	90	48	+42	6
(Germany) TSV Bayer 04 Leverkusen	3	2	0	1	64	64	0	4
(Ukraine) HC Spartak Kyiv	3	1	0	2	69	78	−9	2
(Turkey) Maliye Milli Piyango SK	3	0	0	3	60	93	−33	0

All times are local

17 September 2010; 18:00	Randers HK (Denmark)	32–19	(Ukraine) HC Spartak Kyiv	Elro Arena Randers, Randers; Attendance: 1,000; Referees: Arntsen, Gullaksen (Norway)
17 September 2010; 18:00		(17–6)		Elro Arena Randers, Randers; Attendance: 1,000; Referees: Arntsen, Gullaksen (Norway)
17 September 2010; 18:00		Report		Elro Arena Randers, Randers; Attendance: 1,000; Referees: Arntsen, Gullaksen (Norway)

17 September 2010; 20:00	TSV Bayer 04 Leverkusen (Germany)	28–21	(Turkey) Maliye Milli Piyango SK	Elro Arena Randers, Randers; Attendance: 200; Referees: Mazeika, Gatelis (Lithuania)
17 September 2010; 20:00		(14–9)		Elro Arena Randers, Randers; Attendance: 200; Referees: Mazeika, Gatelis (Lithuania)
17 September 2010; 20:00		Report		Elro Arena Randers, Randers; Attendance: 200; Referees: Mazeika, Gatelis (Lithuania)

18 September 2010; 14:00	Maliye Milli Piyango SK (Turkey)	14–35	(Denmark) Randers HK	Elro Arena Randers, Randers; Attendance: 800; Referees: Arntsen, Gullaksen (Norway)
18 September 2010; 14:00		(6–17)		Elro Arena Randers, Randers; Attendance: 800; Referees: Arntsen, Gullaksen (Norway)
18 September 2010; 14:00		Report		Elro Arena Randers, Randers; Attendance: 800; Referees: Arntsen, Gullaksen (Norway)

18 September 2010; 16:00	HC Spartak Kyiv (Ukraine)	20–21	(Germany) TSV Bayer 04 Leverkusen	Elro Arena Randers, Randers; Attendance: 200; Referees: Mazeika, Gatelis (Lithuania)
18 September 2010; 16:00		(8–10)		Elro Arena Randers, Randers; Attendance: 200; Referees: Mazeika, Gatelis (Lithuania)
18 September 2010; 16:00		Report		Elro Arena Randers, Randers; Attendance: 200; Referees: Mazeika, Gatelis (Lithuania)

19 September 2010; 14:00	Randers HK (Denmark)	23–15	(Germany) TSV Bayer 04 Leverkusen	Elro Arena Randers, Randers; Attendance: 1,200; Referees: Mazeika, Gatelis (Lithuania)
19 September 2010; 14:00		(12–4)		Elro Arena Randers, Randers; Attendance: 1,200; Referees: Mazeika, Gatelis (Lithuania)
19 September 2010; 14:00		Report		Elro Arena Randers, Randers; Attendance: 1,200; Referees: Mazeika, Gatelis (Lithuania)

19 September 2010; 16:00	HC Spartak Kyiv (Ukraine)	30–25	(Turkey) Maliye Milli Piyango SK	Elro Arena Randers, Randers; Attendance: 100; Referees: Arntsen, Gullaksen (Norway)
19 September 2010; 16:00		(16–11)		Elro Arena Randers, Randers; Attendance: 100; Referees: Arntsen, Gullaksen (Norway)
19 September 2010; 16:00		Report		Elro Arena Randers, Randers; Attendance: 100; Referees: Arntsen, Gullaksen (Norway)

==== Group 2 ====
Hosted by A.C. Ormi-Loux Patras in Patras, Greece.

Team	Pld	W	D	L	GF	GA	GD	Pts
(Russia) Zvezda Zvenigorod	3	3	0	0	95	64	+31	6
(Netherlands) T+A/VOC Amsterdam	3	2	0	1	88	68	+20	4
(Spain) BM. Elda Prestigio	3	1	0	2	82	80	+2	2
(Greece) A.C. Ormi-Loux Patras	3	0	0	3	53	106	−53	0

All times are local

17 September 2010; 17:00	BM. Elda Prestigio (Spain)	23–27	(Netherlands) T+A/VOC Amsterdam	Olympionikis Dimitris Tofalos Arena, Patras; Attendance: 100; Referees: Erdogan, Özdeniz (Turkey)
17 September 2010; 17:00		(11–16)		Olympionikis Dimitris Tofalos Arena, Patras; Attendance: 100; Referees: Erdogan, Özdeniz (Turkey)
17 September 2010; 17:00		Report		Olympionikis Dimitris Tofalos Arena, Patras; Attendance: 100; Referees: Erdogan, Özdeniz (Turkey)

17 September 2010; 19:00	Zvezda Zvenigorod (Russia)	34–16	(Greece) A.C. Ormi-Loux Patras	Olympionikis Dimitris Tofalos Arena, Patras; Attendance: 400; Referees: Gubica, Milosevic (Croatia)
17 September 2010; 19:00		(14–7)		Olympionikis Dimitris Tofalos Arena, Patras; Attendance: 400; Referees: Gubica, Milosevic (Croatia)
17 September 2010; 19:00		Report		Olympionikis Dimitris Tofalos Arena, Patras; Attendance: 400; Referees: Gubica, Milosevic (Croatia)

18 September 2010; 17:00	T+A/VOC Amsterdam (Netherlands)	23–28	(Russia) Zvezda Zvenigorod	Olympionikis Dimitris Tofalos Arena, Patras; Attendance: 100; Referees: Erdogan, Özdeniz (Turkey)
18 September 2010; 17:00		(13–12)		Olympionikis Dimitris Tofalos Arena, Patras; Attendance: 100; Referees: Erdogan, Özdeniz (Turkey)
18 September 2010; 17:00		Report		Olympionikis Dimitris Tofalos Arena, Patras; Attendance: 100; Referees: Erdogan, Özdeniz (Turkey)

18 September 2010; 19:00	A.C. Ormi-Loux Patras (Greece)	20–34	(Spain) BM. Elda Prestigio	Olympionikis Dimitris Tofalos Arena, Patras; Attendance: 300; Referees: Gubica, Milosevic (Croatia)
18 September 2010; 19:00		(9–19)		Olympionikis Dimitris Tofalos Arena, Patras; Attendance: 300; Referees: Gubica, Milosevic (Croatia)
18 September 2010; 19:00		Report		Olympionikis Dimitris Tofalos Arena, Patras; Attendance: 300; Referees: Gubica, Milosevic (Croatia)

19 September 2010; 15:30	Zvezda Zvenigorod (Russia)	33–25	(Spain) BM. Elda Prestigio	Olympionikis Dimitris Tofalos Arena, Patras; Attendance: 200; Referees: Gubica, Milosevic (Croatia)
19 September 2010; 15:30		(17–12)		Olympionikis Dimitris Tofalos Arena, Patras; Attendance: 200; Referees: Gubica, Milosevic (Croatia)
19 September 2010; 15:30		Report		Olympionikis Dimitris Tofalos Arena, Patras; Attendance: 200; Referees: Gubica, Milosevic (Croatia)

19 September 2010; 17:30	A.C. Ormi-Loux Patras (Greece)	17–38	(Netherlands) T+A/VOC Amsterdam	Olympionikis Dimitris Tofalos Arena, Patras; Attendance: 300; Referees: Erdogan, Özdeniz (Turkey)
19 September 2010; 17:30		(9–22)		Olympionikis Dimitris Tofalos Arena, Patras; Attendance: 300; Referees: Erdogan, Özdeniz (Turkey)
19 September 2010; 17:30		Report		Olympionikis Dimitris Tofalos Arena, Patras; Attendance: 300; Referees: Erdogan, Özdeniz (Turkey)

==== Group 3 ====
Hosted by ŽRK Metalurg Skopje in Skopje, Macedonia.

Team	Pld	W	D	L	GF	GA	GD	Pts
(Sweden) IK Sävehof	3	3	0	0	94	70	+24	6
(Norway) Byasen	3	2	0	1	85	78	+7	4
(Romania) "U" Jolidon Cluj Napoca	3	1	0	2	75	90	−15	2
(North Macedonia) ŽRK Metalurg Skopje	3	0	0	3	67	83	−16	0

All times are local

17 September 2010; 17:00	"U" Jolidon Cluj Napoca (Romania)	29–24	(North Macedonia) ŽRK Metalurg Skopje	Avtokomanda Sport Hall, Skopje; Attendance: 800; Referees: Opava, Valek (Czech Republic)
17 September 2010; 17:00		(15–12)		Avtokomanda Sport Hall, Skopje; Attendance: 800; Referees: Opava, Valek (Czech Republic)
17 September 2010; 17:00		Report		Avtokomanda Sport Hall, Skopje; Attendance: 800; Referees: Opava, Valek (Czech Republic)

17 September 2010; 19:30	Byasen (Norway)	26–33	(Sweden) IK Sävehof	Avtokomanda Sport Hall, Skopje; Attendance: 400; Referees: Krolokke Lythje, Christiansen (Denmark)
17 September 2010; 19:30		(11–16)		Avtokomanda Sport Hall, Skopje; Attendance: 400; Referees: Krolokke Lythje, Christiansen (Denmark)
17 September 2010; 19:30		Report		Avtokomanda Sport Hall, Skopje; Attendance: 400; Referees: Krolokke Lythje, Christiansen (Denmark)

18 September 2010; 16:30	IK Sävehof (Sweden)	33–21	(Romania) "U" Jolidon Cluj Napoca	Avtokomanda Sport Hall, Skopje; Attendance: 500; Referees: Krolokke Lythje, Christiansen (Denmark)
18 September 2010; 16:30		(14–11)		Avtokomanda Sport Hall, Skopje; Attendance: 500; Referees: Krolokke Lythje, Christiansen (Denmark)
18 September 2010; 16:30		Report		Avtokomanda Sport Hall, Skopje; Attendance: 500; Referees: Krolokke Lythje, Christiansen (Denmark)

18 September 2010; 19:00	ŽRK Metalurg Skopje (North Macedonia)	20–26	(Norway) Byasen	Avtokomanda Sport Hall, Skopje; Attendance: 500; Referees: Opava, Valek (Czech Republic)
18 September 2010; 19:00		(10–14)		Avtokomanda Sport Hall, Skopje; Attendance: 500; Referees: Opava, Valek (Czech Republic)
18 September 2010; 19:00		Report		Avtokomanda Sport Hall, Skopje; Attendance: 500; Referees: Opava, Valek (Czech Republic)

19 September 2010; 16:30	"U" Jolidon Cluj Napoca (Romania)	25–33	(Norway) Byasen	Avtokomanda Sport Hall, Skopje; Attendance: 200; Referees: Opava, Valek (Czech Republic)
19 September 2010; 16:30		(16–13)		Avtokomanda Sport Hall, Skopje; Attendance: 200; Referees: Opava, Valek (Czech Republic)
19 September 2010; 16:30		Report		Avtokomanda Sport Hall, Skopje; Attendance: 200; Referees: Opava, Valek (Czech Republic)

19 September 2010; 19:00	ŽRK Metalurg Skopje (North Macedonia)	23–28	(Sweden) IK Sävehof	Avtokomanda Sport Hall, Skopje; Attendance: 500; Referees: Krolokke Lythje, Christiansen (Denmark)
19 September 2010; 19:00		(12–11)		Avtokomanda Sport Hall, Skopje; Attendance: 500; Referees: Krolokke Lythje, Christiansen (Denmark)
19 September 2010; 19:00		Report		Avtokomanda Sport Hall, Skopje; Attendance: 500; Referees: Krolokke Lythje, Christiansen (Denmark)

==== Group 4 ====
Hosted by SPR Lublin SSA in Lublin & Chelm, Poland.

Team	Pld	W	D	L	GF	GA	GD	Pts
(Hungary) DVSC - Korvex	3	3	0	0	85	70	+15	6
(Serbia) RK Zaječar	3	2	0	1	88	85	+3	4
(Denmark) KIF Vejen	3	1	0	2	85	90	−5	2
(Poland) SPR Lublin SSA	3	0	0	3	86	99	−13	0

All times are local

17 September 2010; 17:30	DVSC-Korvex (Hungary)	29–26	(Poland) SPR Lublin SSA	Globus Sport Hall, Lublin; Attendance: 1,800; Referees: Zotin, Volodkov (Russia)
17 September 2010; 17:30		(13–14)		Globus Sport Hall, Lublin; Attendance: 1,800; Referees: Zotin, Volodkov (Russia)
17 September 2010; 17:30		Report		Globus Sport Hall, Lublin; Attendance: 1,800; Referees: Zotin, Volodkov (Russia)

17 September 2010; 20:00	KIF Vejen (Denmark)	29–30	(Serbia) RK Zaječar	Globus Sport Hall, Lublin; Attendance: 500; Referees: Cvetko, Kavalar (Slovenia)
17 September 2010; 20:00		(13–17)		Globus Sport Hall, Lublin; Attendance: 500; Referees: Cvetko, Kavalar (Slovenia)

18 September 2010; 16:00	RK Zaječar (Serbia)	24–25	(Hungary) DVSC - Korvex	Mosir Sport Hall, Chelm; Attendance: 100; Referees: Zotin, Volodkov (Russia)
18 September 2010; 16:00		(14–14)		Mosir Sport Hall, Chelm; Attendance: 100; Referees: Zotin, Volodkov (Russia)
18 September 2010; 16:00		Report		Mosir Sport Hall, Chelm; Attendance: 100; Referees: Zotin, Volodkov (Russia)

18 September 2010; 18:30	SPR Lublin SSA (Poland)	29–36	(Denmark) KIF Vejen	Mosir Sport Hall, Chelm; Attendance: 300; Referees: Cvetko, Kavalar (Slovenia)
18 September 2010; 18:30		(16–18)		Mosir Sport Hall, Chelm; Attendance: 300; Referees: Cvetko, Kavalar (Slovenia)
18 September 2010; 18:30		Report		Mosir Sport Hall, Chelm; Attendance: 300; Referees: Cvetko, Kavalar (Slovenia)

19 September 2010; 15:30	DVSC - Korvex (Hungary)	31–20	(Denmark) KIF Vejen	Globus Sport Hall, Lublin; Attendance: 600; Referees: Zotin, Volodkov (Russia)
19 September 2010; 15:30		(16–9)		Globus Sport Hall, Lublin; Attendance: 600; Referees: Zotin, Volodkov (Russia)
19 September 2010; 15:30		Report		Globus Sport Hall, Lublin; Attendance: 600; Referees: Zotin, Volodkov (Russia)

19 September 2010; 18:00	SPR Lublin SSA (Poland)	31–34	(Serbia) RK Zajecar	Globus Sport Hall, Lublin; Attendance: 900; Referees: Cvetko, Kavalar (Slovenia)
19 September 2010; 18:00		(17–18)		Globus Sport Hall, Lublin; Attendance: 900; Referees: Cvetko, Kavalar (Slovenia)
19 September 2010; 18:00		Report		Globus Sport Hall, Lublin; Attendance: 900; Referees: Cvetko, Kavalar (Slovenia)

== Group matches ==
Twelve teams, along with four winners of the qualifying rounds, are competing in the group matches of the Champions League. There are four groups of four teams each. The first and second placed team of each group advances to the main round. Third placed teams will enter the Cup Winners' Cup in Round 4.

The draw for the round took place in Vienna on 13 July 2010 as part of a special event organized by the EHF, the Champions' Draw.

=== Group 1 ===
Team	Pld	W	D	L	GF	GA	GD	Pts
(Montenegro) ŽRK Budućnost Podgorica	6	6	0	0	193	148	+45	12
(Russia) HC Dinamo Volgograd	6	3	0	3	191	186	+5	6
(Denmark) Viborg HK	6	3	0	3	192	193	−1	6
(Sweden) IK Sävehof	6	0	0	6	163	212	−49	0

All times are local

9 October 2010; 20:45	ŽRK Budućnost Podgorica (Montenegro)	29–22	(Russia) HC Dinamo Volgograd	Morača Sports Center, Podgorica; Attendance: 5,000; Referees: Leszczynski, Piechota (Poland)
9 October 2010; 20:45	Popović 11	(15–11)	Khmyrova 5	Morača Sports Center, Podgorica; Attendance: 5,000; Referees: Leszczynski, Piechota (Poland)
9 October 2010; 20:45	3× (yellow card) 7× (suspension)	Report	2× (yellow card) 3× (suspension)	Morača Sports Center, Podgorica; Attendance: 5,000; Referees: Leszczynski, Piechota (Poland)

10 October 2010; 14:00	IK Sävehof (Sweden)	24–37	(Denmark) Viborg HK	Partillebohallen, Gothenburg; Attendance: 2,000; Referees: Bonaventura, Bonaventura (France)
10 October 2010; 14:00	Gulldén 7	(13–19)	Vărzaru 7	Partillebohallen, Gothenburg; Attendance: 2,000; Referees: Bonaventura, Bonaventura (France)
10 October 2010; 14:00	2× (yellow card) 3× (suspension)		2× (yellow card) 1× (suspension)	Partillebohallen, Gothenburg; Attendance: 2,000; Referees: Bonaventura, Bonaventura (France)

17 October 2010; 14:00	HC Dinamo Volgograd (Russia)	37–26	(Sweden) IK Sävehof	"Dynamo", Volgograd; Attendance: 1,400; Referees: Opava, Valek (Czech Republic)
17 October 2010; 14:00	Khmyrova, Kochetova 10	(23–12)	Wikensten 5	"Dynamo", Volgograd; Attendance: 1,400; Referees: Opava, Valek (Czech Republic)
17 October 2010; 14:00	3× (yellow card) 3× (suspension)	Report	3× (yellow card) 3× (suspension)	"Dynamo", Volgograd; Attendance: 1,400; Referees: Opava, Valek (Czech Republic)

17 October 2010; 14:25	Viborg HK (Denmark)	25–34	(Montenegro) ŽRK Budućnost Podgorica	Viborg Stadionhal, Viborg; Attendance: 2,000; Referees: Lorente, Serradilla (Spain)
17 October 2010; 14:25	Mikkelsen 8	(16–18)	Bulatović 12	Viborg Stadionhal, Viborg; Attendance: 2,000; Referees: Lorente, Serradilla (Spain)
17 October 2010; 14:25	3× (yellow card) 2× (suspension)	Report	3× (yellow card) 5× (suspension)	Viborg Stadionhal, Viborg; Attendance: 2,000; Referees: Lorente, Serradilla (Spain)

24 October 2010; 13:20	IK Sävehof (Sweden)	24–33	(Montenegro) ŽRK Budućnost Podgorica	Partillebohallen, Gothenburg; Attendance: 900; Referees: Brkic, Jusufhodzic (Austria)
24 October 2010; 13:20	Helleberg 8	(13–16)	Bulatović, Popović 7	Partillebohallen, Gothenburg; Attendance: 900; Referees: Brkic, Jusufhodzic (Austria)
24 October 2010; 13:20	2× (yellow card) 1× (suspension)	Report	3× (yellow card) 3× (suspension)	Partillebohallen, Gothenburg; Attendance: 900; Referees: Brkic, Jusufhodzic (Austria)

24 October 2010; 14:00	HC Dinamo Volgograd (Russia)	41–33	(Denmark) Viborg HK	"Dynamo", Volgograd; Attendance: 1,500; Referees: Horváth, Marton (Hungary)
24 October 2010; 14:00	Kochetova 17	(20–15)	Jurack, Skov 7	"Dynamo", Volgograd; Attendance: 1,500; Referees: Horváth, Marton (Hungary)
24 October 2010; 14:00	3× (yellow card) 5× (suspension)	Report	3× (yellow card) 6× (suspension) 1× (red card)	"Dynamo", Volgograd; Attendance: 1,500; Referees: Horváth, Marton (Hungary)

7 November 2010; 14:20	IK Sävehof (Sweden)	30–35	(Russia) HC Dinamo Volgograd	Partillebohallen, Gothenburg; Attendance: 600; Referees: Florescu, Duta (Romania)
7 November 2010; 14:20	Oden, Wikenstein 7	(17–16)	Iatsenko 10	Partillebohallen, Gothenburg; Attendance: 600; Referees: Florescu, Duta (Romania)
7 November 2010; 14:20	2× (yellow card) 3× (suspension)	Report	3× (yellow card) 1× (suspension)	Partillebohallen, Gothenburg; Attendance: 600; Referees: Florescu, Duta (Romania)

7 November 2010; 19:30	ŽRK Budućnost Podgorica (Montenegro)	32–24	(Denmark) Viborg HK	Morača Sports Center, Podgorica; Attendance: 4,500; Referees: Brunovsky, Canda (Slovakia)
7 November 2010; 19:30	Bulatović, Radičević 6	(16–17)	Chebbah, Jurack 5	Morača Sports Center, Podgorica; Attendance: 4,500; Referees: Brunovsky, Canda (Slovakia)
7 November 2010; 19:30	3× (yellow card) 3× (suspension)	Report	3× (yellow card) 2× (suspension)	Morača Sports Center, Podgorica; Attendance: 4,500; Referees: Brunovsky, Canda (Slovakia)

14 November 2010; 14:00	HC Dinamo Volgograd (Russia)	27–32	(Montenegro) ŽRK Budućnost Podgorica	"Dynamo", Volgograd; Attendance: 1,500; Referees: Stolarovs, Licis (Latvia)
14 November 2010; 14:00	Levina 8	(14–15)	Bulatović 9	"Dynamo", Volgograd; Attendance: 1,500; Referees: Stolarovs, Licis (Latvia)
14 November 2010; 14:00	3× (yellow card) 1× (suspension)	Report	2× (yellow card) 4× (suspension)	"Dynamo", Volgograd; Attendance: 1,500; Referees: Stolarovs, Licis (Latvia)

14 November 2010; 15:50	Viborg HK (Denmark)	37–33	(Sweden) IK Sävehof	Viborg Stadionhal, Viborg; Attendance: 1,400; Referees: Maric, Masic (Serbia)
14 November 2010; 15:50	Chebbah 8	(23–16)	Gulldén 10	Viborg Stadionhal, Viborg; Attendance: 1,400; Referees: Maric, Masic (Serbia)
14 November 2010; 15:50	3× (yellow card) 3× (suspension)	Report	3× (yellow card) 2× (suspension)	Viborg Stadionhal, Viborg; Attendance: 1,400; Referees: Maric, Masic (Serbia)

21 November 2010; 14:25	Viborg HK (Denmark)	36–29	(Russia) HC Dinamo Volgograd	Viborg Stadionhal, Viborg; Attendance: 2,700; Referees: Gubica, Milosevic (Croatia)
21 November 2010; 14:25	Jurack 17	(14–17)	Lambevska 12	Viborg Stadionhal, Viborg; Attendance: 2,700; Referees: Gubica, Milosevic (Croatia)
21 November 2010; 14:25	2× (yellow card) 3× (suspension)	Report	3× (yellow card) 6× (suspension)	Viborg Stadionhal, Viborg; Attendance: 2,700; Referees: Gubica, Milosevic (Croatia)

21 November 2010; 19:30	ŽRK Budućnost Podgorica (Montenegro)	33–26	(Sweden) IK Sävehof	Morača Sports Center, Podgorica; Attendance: 2,000; Referees: Kekes, Kekes (Hungary)
21 November 2010; 19:30	Radičević 9	(16–14)	Fogelström 6	Morača Sports Center, Podgorica; Attendance: 2,000; Referees: Kekes, Kekes (Hungary)
21 November 2010; 19:30	3× (yellow card) 5× (suspension)	Report	2× (yellow card) 2× (suspension)	Morača Sports Center, Podgorica; Attendance: 2,000; Referees: Kekes, Kekes (Hungary)

=== Group 2 ===
Team	Pld	W	D	L	GF	GA	GD	Pts
(Spain) Itxako Reyno de Navarra	6	5	0	1	178	142	+36	10
(Germany) HC Leipzig	6	4	0	2	148	146	+2	8
(Austria) Hypo Niederösterreich	6	2	0	4	137	147	−10	4
(Hungary) DVSC - Korvex	6	1	0	5	143	171	−28	2

All times are local

9 October 2010; 19:00	Itxako Reyno de Navarra (Spain)	23–24	(Germany) HC Leipzig	Polideportivo Municipal Lizarrerria, Estella; Attendance: 1,400; Referees: Gubica, Milosevic (Croatia)
9 October 2010; 19:00	four players 4	(12–14)	Kudłacz 10	Polideportivo Municipal Lizarrerria, Estella; Attendance: 1,400; Referees: Gubica, Milosevic (Croatia)
9 October 2010; 19:00	2× (yellow card) 1× (suspension)	Report	3× (yellow card) 6× (suspension)	Polideportivo Municipal Lizarrerria, Estella; Attendance: 1,400; Referees: Gubica, Milosevic (Croatia)

9 October 2010; 20:25	DVSC - Korvex (Hungary)	22–21	(Austria) Hypo Niederösterreich	Főnix Hall, Debrecen; Attendance: 4,500; Referees: Pavicevic, Raznatovic (Montenegro)
9 October 2010; 20:25	three players 4	(13–7)	Nascimento 8	Főnix Hall, Debrecen; Attendance: 4,500; Referees: Pavicevic, Raznatovic (Montenegro)
9 October 2010; 20:25	3× (yellow card) 2× (suspension)	Report	3× (yellow card) 2× (suspension)	Főnix Hall, Debrecen; Attendance: 4,500; Referees: Pavicevic, Raznatovic (Montenegro)

13 October 2010; 19:30	HC Leipzig (Germany)	31–25	(Hungary) DVSC - Korvex	Leipzig Arena, Leipzig; Attendance: 2,800; Referees: Togstad, Kristiansen (Norway)
13 October 2010; 19:30	Rösler 7	(16–11)	Csáki, Sopronyi 7	Leipzig Arena, Leipzig; Attendance: 2,800; Referees: Togstad, Kristiansen (Norway)
13 October 2010; 19:30	2× (yellow card) 2× (suspension)	Report	2× (yellow card) 3× (suspension)	Leipzig Arena, Leipzig; Attendance: 2,800; Referees: Togstad, Kristiansen (Norway)

16 October 2010; 20:15	Hypo Niederösterreich (Austria)	19–30	(Spain) Itxako Reyno de Navarra	Bundessport- und Freizeitzentrum Südstadt, Maria Enzersdorf; Attendance: 800; Referees: Stolarovs, Licis (Latvia)
16 October 2010; 20:15	Do Nascimento 7	(12–13)	Cabral, Turey 7	Bundessport- und Freizeitzentrum Südstadt, Maria Enzersdorf; Attendance: 800; Referees: Stolarovs, Licis (Latvia)
16 October 2010; 20:15	3× (yellow card) 3× (suspension)	Report	3× (yellow card)	Bundessport- und Freizeitzentrum Südstadt, Maria Enzersdorf; Attendance: 800; Referees: Stolarovs, Licis (Latvia)

23 October 2010; 15:00	HC Leipzig (Germany)	23–28	(Austria) Hypo Niederösterreich	Leipzig Arena, Leipzig; Attendance: 3,000; Referees: Nikolov, Nachevski (Macedonia)
23 October 2010; 15:00	Lyksborg 5	(12–15)	Rotiş-Nagy 12	Leipzig Arena, Leipzig; Attendance: 3,000; Referees: Nikolov, Nachevski (Macedonia)
23 October 2010; 15:00	3× (yellow card) 4× (suspension)	Report	3× (yellow card) 3× (suspension)	Leipzig Arena, Leipzig; Attendance: 3,000; Referees: Nikolov, Nachevski (Macedonia)

24 October 2010; 15:00	DVSC - Korvex (Hungary)	27–32	(Spain) Itxako Reyno de Navarra	Hódos Imre Rendezvénycsarnok, Debrecen; Attendance: 1,600; Referees: Cohen, Peretz (Israel)
24 October 2010; 15:00	Sopronyi 9	(15–19)	Cabral 9	Hódos Imre Rendezvénycsarnok, Debrecen; Attendance: 1,600; Referees: Cohen, Peretz (Israel)
24 October 2010; 15:00	3× (yellow card) 3× (suspension)	Report	3× (yellow card) 8× (suspension) 1× (red card)	Hódos Imre Rendezvénycsarnok, Debrecen; Attendance: 1,600; Referees: Cohen, Peretz (Israel)

6 November 2010; 19:00	Itxako Reyno de Navarra (Spain)	23–21	(Austria) Hypo Niederösterreich	Polideportivo Municipal Lizarrerria, Estella; Attendance: 1,200; Referees: Arntsen, Gullaksen (Norway)
6 November 2010; 19:00	Aguilar, Martín 5	(11–7)	Do Nascimento 6	Polideportivo Municipal Lizarrerria, Estella; Attendance: 1,200; Referees: Arntsen, Gullaksen (Norway)
6 November 2010; 19:00	2× (yellow card) 2× (suspension)	Report	2× (yellow card) 3× (suspension)	Polideportivo Municipal Lizarrerria, Estella; Attendance: 1,200; Referees: Arntsen, Gullaksen (Norway)

7 November 2010; 16:30	DVSC - Korvex (Hungary)	19–20	(Germany) HC Leipzig	Hódos Imre Rendezvénycsarnok, Debrecen; Attendance: 1,600; Referees: Cvetko, Kavalar (Slovenia)
7 November 2010; 16:30	Sopronyi 6	(8–11)	Kudłacz 7	Hódos Imre Rendezvénycsarnok, Debrecen; Attendance: 1,600; Referees: Cvetko, Kavalar (Slovenia)
7 November 2010; 16:30	3× (yellow card) 4× (suspension)	Report	3× (yellow card) 3× (suspension)	Hódos Imre Rendezvénycsarnok, Debrecen; Attendance: 1,600; Referees: Cvetko, Kavalar (Slovenia)

13 November 2010; 20:15	Hypo Niederösterreich (Austria)	28–26	(Hungary) DVSC - Korvex	Bundessport- und Freizeitzentrum Südstadt, Maria Enzersdorf; Attendance: 1,000; Referees: Bonaventura, Bonaventura (France)
13 November 2010; 20:15	Do Nascimento, Rotiş-Nagy 7	(15–14)	Bognár 8	Bundessport- und Freizeitzentrum Südstadt, Maria Enzersdorf; Attendance: 1,000; Referees: Bonaventura, Bonaventura (France)
13 November 2010; 20:15	2× (yellow card) 3× (suspension)	Report	2× (yellow card) 1× (suspension)	Bundessport- und Freizeitzentrum Südstadt, Maria Enzersdorf; Attendance: 1,000; Referees: Bonaventura, Bonaventura (France)

14 November 2010; 15:00	HC Leipzig (Germany)	27–31	(Spain) Itxako Reyno de Navarra	Leipzig Arena, Leipzig; Attendance: 3,200; Referees: Gjeding, Hansen (Denmark)
14 November 2010; 15:00	Kudłacz 9	(16–20)	Aguilar 6	Leipzig Arena, Leipzig; Attendance: 3,200; Referees: Gjeding, Hansen (Denmark)
14 November 2010; 15:00	2× (yellow card) 2× (suspension)	Report	3× (yellow card) 1× (suspension)	Leipzig Arena, Leipzig; Attendance: 3,200; Referees: Gjeding, Hansen (Denmark)

20 November 2010; 19:00	Itxako Reyno de Navarra (Spain)	39–24	(Hungary) DVSC - Korvex	Polideportivo Municipal Lizarrerria, Estella; Attendance: 1,000; Referees: Opava, Valek (Czech Republic)
20 November 2010; 19:00	Pena, Şoit 6	(20–14)	Bulath 7	Polideportivo Municipal Lizarrerria, Estella; Attendance: 1,000; Referees: Opava, Valek (Czech Republic)
20 November 2010; 19:00	2× (yellow card) 1× (suspension)	Report	3× (yellow card) 7× (suspension)	Polideportivo Municipal Lizarrerria, Estella; Attendance: 1,000; Referees: Opava, Valek (Czech Republic)

20 November 2010; 20:15	Hypo Niederösterreich (Austria)	20–23	(Germany) HC Leipzig	Bundessport- und Freizeitzentrum Südstadt, Maria Enzersdorf; Attendance: 1,200; Referees: Guseva, Vartanyan (Russia)
20 November 2010; 20:15	Do Nascimento 5	(12–11)	Ulbricht 7	Bundessport- und Freizeitzentrum Südstadt, Maria Enzersdorf; Attendance: 1,200; Referees: Guseva, Vartanyan (Russia)
20 November 2010; 20:15	3× (yellow card) 1× (suspension)	Report	1× (yellow card) 1× (suspension)	Bundessport- und Freizeitzentrum Südstadt, Maria Enzersdorf; Attendance: 1,200; Referees: Guseva, Vartanyan (Russia)

=== Group 3 ===
Team	Pld	W	D	L	GF	GA	GD	Pts
(Norway) Larvik HK	6	5	0	1	202	157	+45	10
(Romania) Oltchim Râmnicu Vâlcea	6	4	0	2	169	152	+17	8
(France) Toulon St-Cyr	6	2	0	4	148	171	−23	4
(Denmark) Randers HK	6	1	0	5	136	175	−39	2

All times are local

9 October 2010; 14:30	Randers HK (Denmark)	27–23	(Romania) SC Oltchim Râmnicu Vâlcea	Elro Arena Randers, Randers; Attendance: 1,200; Referees: Veber, Pangerc (Slovenia)
9 October 2010; 14:30	Dalby 10	(14–12)	Han 8	Elro Arena Randers, Randers; Attendance: 1,200; Referees: Veber, Pangerc (Slovenia)
9 October 2010; 14:30	3× (yellow card) 5× (suspension)	Report	3× (yellow card) 7× (suspension)	Elro Arena Randers, Randers; Attendance: 1,200; Referees: Veber, Pangerc (Slovenia)

10 October 2010; 16:00	Toulon St-Cyr Var Handball (France)	28–31	(Norway) Larvik HK	Palais des Sports de Toulon, Toulon; Attendance: 2,100; Referees: Nikolovski, Kolevski (Macedonia)
10 October 2010; 16:00	Tuvene 8	(12–16)	Løke, Mørk 7	Palais des Sports de Toulon, Toulon; Attendance: 2,100; Referees: Nikolovski, Kolevski (Macedonia)
10 October 2010; 16:00	3× (yellow card) 3× (suspension)	Report	3× (yellow card) 6× (suspension)	Palais des Sports de Toulon, Toulon; Attendance: 2,100; Referees: Nikolovski, Kolevski (Macedonia)

16 October 2010; 17:45	Larvik HK (Norway)	33–19	(Denmark) Randers HK	Arena Larvik, Larvik; Attendance: 1,800; Referees: Leandersson, Lindroos (Finland)
16 October 2010; 17:45	Løke 10	(18–8)	Dalby 5	Arena Larvik, Larvik; Attendance: 1,800; Referees: Leandersson, Lindroos (Finland)
16 October 2010; 17:45	3× (yellow card) 3× (suspension)	Report	3× (yellow card) 5× (suspension)	Arena Larvik, Larvik; Attendance: 1,800; Referees: Leandersson, Lindroos (Finland)

17 October 2010; 18:00	CS Oltchim Râmnicu Vâlcea (Romania)	28–19	(France) Toulon St-Cyr Var Handball	Sala Sporturilor Traian, Râmnicu Vâlcea; Attendance: 1,600; Referees: Guseva, Vartanyan (Russia)
17 October 2010; 18:00	Ardean-Elisei 7	(15–9)	Mwasesa 5	Sala Sporturilor Traian, Râmnicu Vâlcea; Attendance: 1,600; Referees: Guseva, Vartanyan (Russia)
17 October 2010; 18:00	3× (yellow card) 4× (suspension)	Report	3× (yellow card) 2× (suspension)	Sala Sporturilor Traian, Râmnicu Vâlcea; Attendance: 1,600; Referees: Guseva, Vartanyan (Russia)

23 October 2010; 14:30	Randers HK (Denmark)	25–29	(France) Toulon St-Cyr Var Handball	Elro Arena Randers, Randers; Attendance: 1,400; Referees: Novikov, Perepilitsy (Ukraine)
23 October 2010; 14:30	Wörz 6	(12–16)	Mwasesa 9	Elro Arena Randers, Randers; Attendance: 1,400; Referees: Novikov, Perepilitsy (Ukraine)
23 October 2010; 14:30	2× (yellow card) 4× (suspension)	Report	3× (yellow card) 2× (suspension)	Elro Arena Randers, Randers; Attendance: 1,400; Referees: Novikov, Perepilitsy (Ukraine)

23 October 2010; 17:15	Larvik HK (Norway)	34–31	(Romania) SC Oltchim Râmnicu Vâlcea	Arena Larvik, Larvik; Attendance: 2,800; Referees: Gubica, Milosevic (Croatia)
23 October 2010; 17:15	Mørk 9	(17–18)	Farcău 7	Arena Larvik, Larvik; Attendance: 2,800; Referees: Gubica, Milosevic (Croatia)
23 October 2010; 17:15	3× (yellow card) 4× (suspension)	Report	2× (yellow card) 6× (suspension)	Arena Larvik, Larvik; Attendance: 2,800; Referees: Gubica, Milosevic (Croatia)

7 November 2010; 14:00	Randers HK (Denmark)	20–38	(Norway) Larvik HK	Elro Arena Randers, Randers; Attendance: 2,100; Referees: Andorka, Hucker (Hungary)
7 November 2010; 14:00	Aaen, Dalby 5	(13–20)	Riegelhuth 6	Elro Arena Randers, Randers; Attendance: 2,100; Referees: Andorka, Hucker (Hungary)
7 November 2010; 14:00	3× (yellow card) 2× (suspension)	Report	3× (yellow card) 1× (suspension)	Elro Arena Randers, Randers; Attendance: 2,100; Referees: Andorka, Hucker (Hungary)

7 November 2010; 17:00	Toulon St-Cyr Var Handball (France)	22–26	(Romania) SC Oltchim Râmnicu Vâlcea	Palais des Sports de Toulon, Toulon; Attendance: 2,400; Referees: Pavicevic, Raznatovic (Montenegro)
7 November 2010; 17:00	Mwasesa 10	(13–13)	Ardean-Elisei, Neagu 5	Palais des Sports de Toulon, Toulon; Attendance: 2,400; Referees: Pavicevic, Raznatovic (Montenegro)
7 November 2010; 17:00	3× (yellow card) 3× (suspension)	Report	3× (yellow card) 4× (suspension)	Palais des Sports de Toulon, Toulon; Attendance: 2,400; Referees: Pavicevic, Raznatovic (Montenegro)

13 November 2010; 17:15	Larvik HK (Norway)	38–26	(France) Toulon St-Cyr Var Handball	Arena Larvik, Larvik; Attendance: 2,500; Referees: Vodopivec, Krasna (Slovenia)
13 November 2010; 17:15	Løke 12	(23–13)	Tuvene 7	Arena Larvik, Larvik; Attendance: 2,500; Referees: Vodopivec, Krasna (Slovenia)
13 November 2010; 17:15	3× (yellow card) 5× (suspension) 1× (red card)	Report	3× (yellow card) 6× (suspension)	Arena Larvik, Larvik; Attendance: 2,500; Referees: Vodopivec, Krasna (Slovenia)

14 November 2010; 18:00	CS Oltchim Râmnicu Vâlcea (Romania)	28–22	(Denmark) Randers HK	Sala Sporturilor Traian, Râmnicu Vâlcea; Referees: Mazeika, Gatelis (Lithuania)
14 November 2010; 18:00	Stanca 8	(12–9)	Fruelund 4	Sala Sporturilor Traian, Râmnicu Vâlcea; Referees: Mazeika, Gatelis (Lithuania)
14 November 2010; 18:00	3× (yellow card) 3× (suspension)	Report	3× (yellow card) 3× (suspension)	Sala Sporturilor Traian, Râmnicu Vâlcea; Referees: Mazeika, Gatelis (Lithuania)

21 November 2010; 18:00	CS Oltchim Râmnicu Vâlcea (Romania)	33–28	(Norway) Larvik HK	Sala Sporturilor Traian, Râmnicu Vâlcea; Attendance: 1,900; Referees: Brunovsky, Canda (Slovakia)
21 November 2010; 18:00	Ardean-Elisei, Stanca 6	(18–13)	three players 6	Sala Sporturilor Traian, Râmnicu Vâlcea; Attendance: 1,900; Referees: Brunovsky, Canda (Slovakia)
21 November 2010; 18:00	3× (yellow card) 4× (suspension)	Report	3× (yellow card) 6× (suspension)	Sala Sporturilor Traian, Râmnicu Vâlcea; Attendance: 1,900; Referees: Brunovsky, Canda (Slovakia)

21 November 2010; 18:45	Toulon St-Cyr Var Handball (France)	24–23	(Denmark) Randers HK	Palais des Sports de Toulon, Toulon; Attendance: 3,200; Referees: Cohen, Peretz (Israel)
21 November 2010; 18:45		(16–10)		Palais des Sports de Toulon, Toulon; Attendance: 3,200; Referees: Cohen, Peretz (Israel)
21 November 2010; 18:45		Report		Palais des Sports de Toulon, Toulon; Attendance: 3,200; Referees: Cohen, Peretz (Israel)

=== Group 4 ===
Team	Pld	W	D	L	GF	GA	GD	Pts
(Hungary) Győri Audi ETO KC	6	5	0	1	183	153	+30	10
(Slovenia) RK Krim Ljubljana	6	4	0	2	181	172	+9	8
(Russia) Zvezda Zvenigorod	6	2	0	4	170	197	−27	4
(Croatia) RK Podravka Vegeta	6	1	0	5	168	180	−12	2

10 October 2010; 17:00	Zvezda Zvenigorod (Russia)	31–28	(Hungary) Győri Audi ETO KC	Sport Hall "Olimpiyskiy" Chekhov; Attendance: 1,500; Referees: Nybo, Poulsen (Denmark)
10 October 2010; 17:00	Kuznetcova 8	(17–14)	Görbicz 9	Sport Hall "Olimpiyskiy" Chekhov; Attendance: 1,500; Referees: Nybo, Poulsen (Denmark)
10 October 2010; 17:00	3× (yellow card) 3× (suspension)	Report	3× (yellow card) 4× (suspension)	Sport Hall "Olimpiyskiy" Chekhov; Attendance: 1,500; Referees: Nybo, Poulsen (Denmark)

10 October 2010; 17:00	RK Podravka Vegeta (Croatia)	30–35	(Slovenia) RK Krim Ljubljana	"Fran Galović", Koprivnica; Attendance: 2,000; Referees: Arntsen, Gullaksen (Norway)
10 October 2010; 17:00	Pušić, Zebić 6	(16–19)	Lekić 7	"Fran Galović", Koprivnica; Attendance: 2,000; Referees: Arntsen, Gullaksen (Norway)
10 October 2010; 17:00	3× (yellow card) 5× (suspension)	Report	2× (yellow card) 1× (suspension)	"Fran Galović", Koprivnica; Attendance: 2,000; Referees: Arntsen, Gullaksen (Norway)

16 October 2010; 18:00	RK Krim Ljubljana (Slovenia)	37–32	(Russia) Zvezda Zvenigorod	Arena Stožice, Ljubljana; Attendance: 3,200; Referees: Cirligeanu, Bejinariu (Romania)
16 October 2010; 18:00	Varlec 9	(17–17)	Sen 8	Arena Stožice, Ljubljana; Attendance: 3,200; Referees: Cirligeanu, Bejinariu (Romania)
16 October 2010; 18:00	2× (yellow card) 2× (suspension)	Report	3× (yellow card) 6× (suspension)	Arena Stožice, Ljubljana; Attendance: 3,200; Referees: Cirligeanu, Bejinariu (Romania)

17 October 2010; 15:25	Győri Audi ETO KC (Hungary)	27–25	(Croatia) RK Podravka Vegeta	Sport Hall Mihály Magvassy, Győr; Attendance: 2,000; Referees: Florescu, Duta (Romania)
17 October 2010; 15:25	Gros 8	(18–15)	Milanović Litre, Nikčević 4	Sport Hall Mihály Magvassy, Győr; Attendance: 2,000; Referees: Florescu, Duta (Romania)
17 October 2010; 15:25	3× (yellow card) 3× (suspension)	Report	3× (yellow card) 5× (suspension)	Sport Hall Mihály Magvassy, Győr; Attendance: 2,000; Referees: Florescu, Duta (Romania)

23 October 2010; 18:30	RK Krim Ljubljana (Slovenia)	30–34	(Hungary) Győri Audi ETO KC	Arena Stožice, Ljubljana; Attendance: 3,600; Referees: Dentz, Reibel (France)
23 October 2010; 18:30	Lekić 10	(14–19)	Görbicz 11	Arena Stožice, Ljubljana; Attendance: 3,600; Referees: Dentz, Reibel (France)
23 October 2010; 18:30	3× (yellow card) 4× (suspension)	Report	3× (yellow card) 10× (suspension) 1× (red card)	Arena Stožice, Ljubljana; Attendance: 3,600; Referees: Dentz, Reibel (France)

24 October 2010; 16:00	Zvezda Zvenigorod (Russia)	29–26	(Croatia) RK Podravka Vegeta	Sport Hall "Olimpiyskiy" Chekhov; Attendance: 2,000; Referees: Lythje, Christiansen (Denmark)
24 October 2010; 16:00	Postnova, Sen 7	(11–14)	Pasicnik 6	Sport Hall "Olimpiyskiy" Chekhov; Attendance: 2,000; Referees: Lythje, Christiansen (Denmark)
24 October 2010; 16:00	3× (yellow card) 3× (suspension)	Report	2× (yellow card) 7× (suspension) 1× (red card)	Sport Hall "Olimpiyskiy" Chekhov; Attendance: 2,000; Referees: Lythje, Christiansen (Denmark)

7 November 2010; 14:00	Zvezda Zvenigorod (Russia)	28–32	(Slovenia) RK Krim Ljubljana	Sport Hall "Olimpiyskiy" Chekhov; Attendance: 1,000; Referees: Pandzic, Mosorinski (Serbia)
7 November 2010; 14:00	Kuznetcova 9	(7–19)	Lekić 8	Sport Hall "Olimpiyskiy" Chekhov; Attendance: 1,000; Referees: Pandzic, Mosorinski (Serbia)
7 November 2010; 14:00	3× (yellow card) 5× (suspension) 1× (red card)	Report	3× (yellow card) 2× (suspension)	Sport Hall "Olimpiyskiy" Chekhov; Attendance: 1,000; Referees: Pandzic, Mosorinski (Serbia)

7 November 2010; 14:30	RK Podravka Vegeta (Croatia)	24–35	(Hungary) Győri Audi ETO KC	"Fran Galović", Koprivnica; Attendance: 1,900; Referees: Covalciuc, Colvalciuc (Moldova)
7 November 2010; 14:30	Pušić 8	(10–19)	Görbicz 8	"Fran Galović", Koprivnica; Attendance: 1,900; Referees: Covalciuc, Colvalciuc (Moldova)
7 November 2010; 14:30	3× (yellow card) 5× (suspension)	Report	3× (yellow card) 5× (suspension)	"Fran Galović", Koprivnica; Attendance: 1,900; Referees: Covalciuc, Colvalciuc (Moldova)

13 November 2010; 17:25	Győri Audi ETO KC (Hungary)	33–22	(Russia) Zvezda Zvenigorod	Sport Hall Mihály Magvassy, Győr; Attendance: 2,300; Referees: Methe, Methe (Germany)
13 November 2010; 17:25	Görbicz 7	(19–12)	Sen 8	Sport Hall Mihály Magvassy, Győr; Attendance: 2,300; Referees: Methe, Methe (Germany)
13 November 2010; 17:25	3× (yellow card) 4× (suspension)	Report	3× (yellow card) 4× (suspension)	Sport Hall Mihály Magvassy, Győr; Attendance: 2,300; Referees: Methe, Methe (Germany)

13 November 2010; 18:15	RK Krim Ljubljana (Slovenia)	26–22	(Croatia) RK Podravka Vegeta	Arena Stožice, Ljubljana; Attendance: 3,500; Referees: Wyss, Zowa (Switzerland)
13 November 2010; 18:15	three players 5	(12–12)	Nikčević 5	Arena Stožice, Ljubljana; Attendance: 3,500; Referees: Wyss, Zowa (Switzerland)
13 November 2010; 18:15	3× (yellow card) 3× (suspension)	Report	4× (yellow card) 5× (suspension)	Arena Stožice, Ljubljana; Attendance: 3,500; Referees: Wyss, Zowa (Switzerland)

20 November 2010; 17:15	Győri Audi ETO KC (Hungary)	26–21	(Slovenia) RK Krim Ljubljana	Sport Hall Mihály Magvassy, Győr; Attendance: 2,800; Referees: Togstad, Kristiansen (Norway)
20 November 2010; 17:15	Vérten 6	(11–9)	Mavsar, Vergelyuk 5	Sport Hall Mihály Magvassy, Győr; Attendance: 2,800; Referees: Togstad, Kristiansen (Norway)
20 November 2010; 17:15	3× (yellow card) 2× (suspension)	Report	3× (yellow card) 1× (suspension)	Sport Hall Mihály Magvassy, Győr; Attendance: 2,800; Referees: Togstad, Kristiansen (Norway)

21 November 2010; 16:00	RK Podravka Vegeta (Croatia)	41–28	(Russia) Zvezda Zvenigorod	"Fran Galović", Koprivnica; Attendance: 2,000; Referees: Erdogan, Özdeniz (Turkey)
21 November 2010; 16:00	Petkovic 9	(22–17)	Vetkova 11	"Fran Galović", Koprivnica; Attendance: 2,000; Referees: Erdogan, Özdeniz (Turkey)
21 November 2010; 16:00	3× (yellow card) 4× (suspension)	Report	2× (yellow card) 3× (suspension)	"Fran Galović", Koprivnica; Attendance: 2,000; Referees: Erdogan, Özdeniz (Turkey)

== Main round ==
The draw took place at 23 November 2010 in Vienna. Each group will consist of two group winners and two runners-up, although teams that faced each other in the Group Matches could not be drawn into the same group.

Group winners	Runners-up
(Montenegro) ŽRK Budućnost Podgorica (Spain) SD Itxako (Norway) Larvik HK (Hungary) Győri Audi ETO KC	(Russia) HC Dinamo Volgograd (Germany) HC Leipzig (Romania) Oltchim Râmnicu Vâlcea (Slovenia) RK Krim Ljubljana

=== Group 1 ===
Team	Pld	W	D	L	GF	GA	GD	Pts
(Montenegro) ŽRK Budućnost Podgorica	6	4	0	2	180	160	+20	8
(Spain) Itxako Reyno de Navarra	6	4	0	2	155	157	−2	8
(Slovenia) RK Krim Ljubljana	6	2	0	4	183	184	−1	4
(Romania) Oltchim Râmnicu Vâlcea	6	2	0	4	150	167	−17	4

4 February 2011; 20:15	RK Krim Ljubljana (Slovenia)	30–26	(Spain) Itxako Reyno de Navarra	Hala Tivoli, Ljubljana; Attendance: 3,300; Referees: Horváth, Marton (Hungary)
4 February 2011; 20:15	Lekić 8	(17–12)	Martín Berenguer 6	Hala Tivoli, Ljubljana; Attendance: 3,300; Referees: Horváth, Marton (Hungary)
4 February 2011; 20:15	3× (yellow card) 3× (suspension)	Report	3× (yellow card) 2× (suspension)	Hala Tivoli, Ljubljana; Attendance: 3,300; Referees: Horváth, Marton (Hungary)

6 February 2011; 18:00	CS Oltchim Râmnicu Vâlcea (Romania)	21–20	(Montenegro) ŽRK Budućnost Podgorica	Sala Sporturilor Traian, Râmnicu Vâlcea; Attendance: 2,000; Referees: Opava, Valek (Czech Republic)
6 February 2011; 18:00	Ardean-Elisei 8	(13–12)	Bulatović, Jovanović 5	Sala Sporturilor Traian, Râmnicu Vâlcea; Attendance: 2,000; Referees: Opava, Valek (Czech Republic)
6 February 2011; 18:00	3× (yellow card) 1× (suspension)	Report	3× (yellow card) 1× (suspension)	Sala Sporturilor Traian, Râmnicu Vâlcea; Attendance: 2,000; Referees: Opava, Valek (Czech Republic)

12 February 2011; 19:00	Itxako Reyno de Navarra (Spain)	26–25	(Romania) SC Oltchim Râmnicu Vâlcea	Polideportivo Municipal Lizarrerria, Estella-Lizarra; Attendance: 1,900; Referees: Pedersen, Mortensen (Denmark)
12 February 2011; 19:00	Turey 9	(10–14)	Vizitiu 8	Polideportivo Municipal Lizarrerria, Estella-Lizarra; Attendance: 1,900; Referees: Pedersen, Mortensen (Denmark)
12 February 2011; 19:00	3× (yellow card) 4× (suspension)	Report	3× (yellow card) 4× (suspension)	Polideportivo Municipal Lizarrerria, Estella-Lizarra; Attendance: 1,900; Referees: Pedersen, Mortensen (Denmark)

13 February 2011; 19:30	ŽRK Budućnost Podgorica (Montenegro)	32–29	(Slovenia) RK Krim Ljubljana	Morača Sports Center, Podgorica; Attendance: 4,500; Referees: Gubica, Milosevic (Croatia)
13 February 2011; 19:30	Bulatović 6	(17–12)	Lekić 11	Morača Sports Center, Podgorica; Attendance: 4,500; Referees: Gubica, Milosevic (Croatia)
13 February 2011; 19:30	3× (yellow card) 2× (suspension)	Report	3× (yellow card) 1× (suspension)	Morača Sports Center, Podgorica; Attendance: 4,500; Referees: Gubica, Milosevic (Croatia)

20 February 2011; 18:00	Oltchim Râmnicu Vâlcea (Romania)	31–27	(Slovenia) RK Krim Ljubljana	Sala Sporturilor Traian, Râmnicu Vâlcea; Attendance: 2,000; Referees: Bonaventura, Bonaventura (France)
20 February 2011; 18:00	Ardean-Elisei 8	(14–14)	Penezić 10	Sala Sporturilor Traian, Râmnicu Vâlcea; Attendance: 2,000; Referees: Bonaventura, Bonaventura (France)
20 February 2011; 18:00	3× (yellow card) 1× (suspension)	Report	2× (yellow card) 4× (suspension)	Sala Sporturilor Traian, Râmnicu Vâlcea; Attendance: 2,000; Referees: Bonaventura, Bonaventura (France)

20 February 2011; 19:00	Itxako Reyno de Navarra (Spain)	31–26	(Montenegro) ŽRK Budućnost Podgorica	Polideportivo Municipal Lizarrerria, Estella-Lizarra; Attendance: 1,800; Referees: Rakytina, Tkachuk (Ukraine)
20 February 2011; 19:00	Martín Berenguer, Şoit 7	(16–10)	Popović 7	Polideportivo Municipal Lizarrerria, Estella-Lizarra; Attendance: 1,800; Referees: Rakytina, Tkachuk (Ukraine)
20 February 2011; 19:00	3× (yellow card) 3× (suspension)	Report	3× (yellow card) 2× (suspension)	Polideportivo Municipal Lizarrerria, Estella-Lizarra; Attendance: 1,800; Referees: Rakytina, Tkachuk (Ukraine)

4 March 2011; 19:30	RK Krim Ljubljana (Slovenia)	36–40	(Montenegro) ŽRK Budućnost Podgorica	Hala Tivoli, Ljubljana; Attendance: 3,700; Referees: Nikolov, Nachevski (Macedonia)
4 March 2011; 19:30	Lekić 7	(19–23)	Bulatović, Djokić, Popović 8	Hala Tivoli, Ljubljana; Attendance: 3,700; Referees: Nikolov, Nachevski (Macedonia)
4 March 2011; 19:30	3× (yellow card) 1× (suspension)	Report	3× (yellow card) 4× (suspension)	Hala Tivoli, Ljubljana; Attendance: 3,700; Referees: Nikolov, Nachevski (Macedonia)

6 March 2011; 18:00	Oltchim Râmnicu Vâlcea (Romania)	22–25	(Spain) Itxako Reyno de Navarra	Sala Sporturilor Traian, Râmnicu Vâlcea; Attendance: 2,000; Referees: Pandzic, Mosorinski (Serbia)
6 March 2011; 18:00	Ardean Elisei 6	(12–11)	Fernández 7	Sala Sporturilor Traian, Râmnicu Vâlcea; Attendance: 2,000; Referees: Pandzic, Mosorinski (Serbia)
6 March 2011; 18:00	3× (yellow card) 5× (suspension)	Report	3× (yellow card) 2× (suspension)	Sala Sporturilor Traian, Râmnicu Vâlcea; Attendance: 2,000; Referees: Pandzic, Mosorinski (Serbia)

12 March 2011; 19:00	Itxako Reyno de Navarra (Spain)	25–24	(Slovenia) RK Krim Ljubljana	Polideportivo Municipal Lizarrerria, Estella-Lizarra; Attendance: 1,800; Referees: Andersen, Sodal (Norway)
12 March 2011; 19:00	Cabral 10	(15–13)	Mavsar 8	Polideportivo Municipal Lizarrerria, Estella-Lizarra; Attendance: 1,800; Referees: Andersen, Sodal (Norway)
12 March 2011; 19:00	3× (yellow card) 4× (suspension)	Report	3× (yellow card) 4× (suspension)	Polideportivo Municipal Lizarrerria, Estella-Lizarra; Attendance: 1,800; Referees: Andersen, Sodal (Norway)

13 March 2011; 19:30	ŽRK Budućnost Podgorica (Montenegro)	32–21	(Romania) SC Oltchim Râmnicu Vâlcea	Morača Sports Center, Podgorica; Attendance: 4,500; Referees: Badura, Ondogrecula (Slovakia)
13 March 2011; 19:30	Bulatović 9	(16–9)	Vizitiu 5	Morača Sports Center, Podgorica; Attendance: 4,500; Referees: Badura, Ondogrecula (Slovakia)
13 March 2011; 19:30	3× (yellow card) 7× (suspension) 1× (red card)	Report	2× (yellow card) 3× (suspension)	Morača Sports Center, Podgorica; Attendance: 4,500; Referees: Badura, Ondogrecula (Slovakia)

19 March 2011; 17:30	RK Krim Ljubljana (Slovenia)	37–30	(Romania) SC Oltchim Râmnicu Vâlcea	Hala Tivoli, Ljubljana; Attendance: 2,500; Referees: Johansson, Kliko (Sweden)
19 March 2011; 17:30	Mavsar, Penezić 7	(17–19)	three players 6	Hala Tivoli, Ljubljana; Attendance: 2,500; Referees: Johansson, Kliko (Sweden)
19 March 2011; 17:30	3× (yellow card) 1× (suspension)	Report	3× (yellow card) 4× (suspension)	Hala Tivoli, Ljubljana; Attendance: 2,500; Referees: Johansson, Kliko (Sweden)

20 March 2011; 19:30	ŽRK Budućnost Podgorica (Montenegro)	30–22	(Spain) Itxako Reyno de Navarra	Morača Sports Center, Podgorica; Attendance: 4,500; Referees: Bonifert, Oláh (Hungary)
20 March 2011; 19:30	Jovanović 7	(15–13)	Cabral 8	Morača Sports Center, Podgorica; Attendance: 4,500; Referees: Bonifert, Oláh (Hungary)
20 March 2011; 19:30	2× (yellow card) 7× (suspension) 1× (red card)	Report	2× (yellow card) 7× (suspension) 1× (red card)	Morača Sports Center, Podgorica; Attendance: 4,500; Referees: Bonifert, Oláh (Hungary)

=== Group 2 ===
Team	Pld	W	D	L	GF	GA	GD	Pts
(Hungary) Győri Audi ETO KC	6	5	0	1	159	131	+28	10
(Norway) Larvik HK	6	5	0	1	168	129	+39	10
(Russia) HC Dinamo Volgograd	6	2	0	4	141	180	−39	4
(Germany) HC Leipzig	6	0	0	6	132	160	−28	0

5 February 2011; 14:00	HC Dinamo Volgograd (Russia)	24–26	(Hungary) Győri Audi ETO KC	"Dynamo", Volgograd; Attendance: 1,500; Referees: Vodopivec, Krasna (Slovenia)
5 February 2011; 14:00	Makeeva 6	(11–14)	Vérten 6	"Dynamo", Volgograd; Attendance: 1,500; Referees: Vodopivec, Krasna (Slovenia)
5 February 2011; 14:00	3× (yellow card) 3× (suspension)	Report	3× (yellow card) 6× (suspension)	"Dynamo", Volgograd; Attendance: 1,500; Referees: Vodopivec, Krasna (Slovenia)

5 February 2011; 15:00	HC Leipzig (Germany)	24–26	(Norway) Larvik HK	Leipzig Arena, Leipzig; Attendance: 5,200; Referees: Baranowski, Lemanowicz (Poland)
5 February 2011; 15:00	Rösler 5	(12–13)	Mørk 9	Leipzig Arena, Leipzig; Attendance: 5,200; Referees: Baranowski, Lemanowicz (Poland)
5 February 2011; 15:00	3× (yellow card) 3× (suspension)	Report	3× (yellow card) 6× (suspension)	Leipzig Arena, Leipzig; Attendance: 5,200; Referees: Baranowski, Lemanowicz (Poland)

12 February 2011; 17:45	Larvik HK (Norway)	41–20	(Russia) HC Dinamo Volgograd	Arena Larvik, Larvik; Attendance: 4,200; Referees: Dentz, Reibel (France)
12 February 2011; 17:45	Mørk 10	(24–9)	Khmyrova 4	Arena Larvik, Larvik; Attendance: 4,200; Referees: Dentz, Reibel (France)
12 February 2011; 17:45	3× (yellow card) 2× (suspension)	Report	3× (yellow card) 6× (suspension)	Arena Larvik, Larvik; Attendance: 4,200; Referees: Dentz, Reibel (France)

13 February 2011; 18:15	Győri Audi ETO KC (Hungary)	25–20	(Germany) HC Leipzig	Magvassy Mihály Sportcsarnok, Győr; Attendance: 2,500; Referees: Maric, Masic (Serbia)
13 February 2011; 18:15	Spiridon 6	(11–8)	Lyksborg 5	Magvassy Mihály Sportcsarnok, Győr; Attendance: 2,500; Referees: Maric, Masic (Serbia)
13 February 2011; 18:15	3× (yellow card) 3× (suspension)	Report	3× (yellow card) 2× (suspension)	Magvassy Mihály Sportcsarnok, Győr; Attendance: 2,500; Referees: Maric, Masic (Serbia)

19 February 2011; 14:00	HC Dinamo Volgograd (Russia)	25–22	(Germany) HC Leipzig	Magvassy Mihály Sportcsarnok, Győr; Attendance: 1,500; Referees: Badura, Ondogrecula (Slovakia)
19 February 2011; 14:00	Kochetova 10	(12–7)	Schülke 12	Magvassy Mihály Sportcsarnok, Győr; Attendance: 1,500; Referees: Badura, Ondogrecula (Slovakia)
19 February 2011; 14:00	3× (yellow card) 4× (suspension)	Report	3× (yellow card) 4× (suspension)	Magvassy Mihály Sportcsarnok, Győr; Attendance: 1,500; Referees: Badura, Ondogrecula (Slovakia)

19 February 2011; 17:45	Larvik HK (Norway)	16–25	(Hungary) Győri Audi ETO KC	Arena Larvik, Larvik; Attendance: 3,400; Referees: Horacek, Novotny (Czech Republic)
19 February 2011; 17:45	Larsen 5	(7–17)	Amorim, Görbicz 5	Arena Larvik, Larvik; Attendance: 3,400; Referees: Horacek, Novotny (Czech Republic)
19 February 2011; 17:45	2× (yellow card) 2× (suspension)	Report	3× (yellow card) 6× (suspension) 1× (red card)	Arena Larvik, Larvik; Attendance: 3,400; Referees: Horacek, Novotny (Czech Republic)

5 March 2011; 14:00	HC Dinamo Volgograd (Russia)	23–32	(Norway) Larvik HK	"Dynamo", Volgograd; Attendance: 1,400; Referees: Stark, Stefan (Romania)
5 March 2011; 14:00	Milova 8	(11–16)	Sulland 12	"Dynamo", Volgograd; Attendance: 1,400; Referees: Stark, Stefan (Romania)
5 March 2011; 14:00	3× (yellow card) 4× (suspension)	Report	3× (yellow card) 3× (suspension)	"Dynamo", Volgograd; Attendance: 1,400; Referees: Stark, Stefan (Romania)

6 March 2011; 14:30	HC Leipzig (Germany)	24–29	(Hungary) Győri Audi ETO KC	Leipzig Arena, Leipzig; Attendance: 3,800; Referees: Gousko, Repkin (Belarus)
6 March 2011; 14:30	Kudłacz 10	(10–16)	Görbicz 12	Leipzig Arena, Leipzig; Attendance: 3,800; Referees: Gousko, Repkin (Belarus)
6 March 2011; 14:30	3× (yellow card)	Report	2× (yellow card) 3× (suspension)	Leipzig Arena, Leipzig; Attendance: 3,800; Referees: Gousko, Repkin (Belarus)

12 March 2011; 16:45	Larvik HK (Norway)	29–19	(Germany) HC Leipzig	Arena Larvik, Larvik; Attendance: 2,300; Referees: Kouz, Zhoba (Ukraine)
12 March 2011; 16:45	Løke 9	(14–10)	Kudłacz 6	Arena Larvik, Larvik; Attendance: 2,300; Referees: Kouz, Zhoba (Ukraine)
12 March 2011; 16:45	3× (yellow card) 4× (suspension)	Report	3× (yellow card) 6× (suspension)	Arena Larvik, Larvik; Attendance: 2,300; Referees: Kouz, Zhoba (Ukraine)

13 March 2011; 18:15	Győri Audi ETO KC (Hungary)	36–23	(Russia) HC Dinamo Volgograd	Magvassy Mihály Sportcsarnok, Győr; Attendance: 2,600; Referees: Pandzic, Satordzija (Bosnia and Herzegovina)
13 March 2011; 18:15	Görbicz 10	(18–13)	Kochetova 6	Magvassy Mihály Sportcsarnok, Győr; Attendance: 2,600; Referees: Pandzic, Satordzija (Bosnia and Herzegovina)
13 March 2011; 18:15	3× (yellow card) 2× (suspension)	Report	3× (yellow card) 3× (suspension)	Magvassy Mihály Sportcsarnok, Győr; Attendance: 2,600; Referees: Pandzic, Satordzija (Bosnia and Herzegovina)

19 March 2011; 15:00	HC Leipzig (Germany)	23–26	(Russia) HC Dinamo Volgograd	Leipzig Arena, Leipzig; Attendance: 2,200; Referees: Pavel, State (Romania)
19 March 2011; 15:00	Kudłacz 9	(13–12)	Kochetova 8	Leipzig Arena, Leipzig; Attendance: 2,200; Referees: Pavel, State (Romania)
19 March 2011; 15:00	3× (yellow card) 1× (suspension)	Report	3× (yellow card) 3× (suspension)	Leipzig Arena, Leipzig; Attendance: 2,200; Referees: Pavel, State (Romania)

20 March 2011; 18:15	Győri Audi ETO KC (Hungary)	18–24	(Norway) Larvik HK	Magvassy Mihály Sportcsarnok, Győr; Attendance: 2,600; Referees: Stolarovs, Licis (Latvia)
20 March 2011; 18:15	Amorim 5	(9–12)	Johansen 6	Magvassy Mihály Sportcsarnok, Győr; Attendance: 2,600; Referees: Stolarovs, Licis (Latvia)
20 March 2011; 18:15	2× (yellow card) 4× (suspension)	Report	2× (yellow card) 7× (suspension)	Magvassy Mihály Sportcsarnok, Győr; Attendance: 2,600; Referees: Stolarovs, Licis (Latvia)

== Semifinals ==
The semifinals were held on 9 April and 17 April 2011. The winner of each main round group played the second match at home.

Team 1	Agg.	Team 2	1st leg	2nd leg
Larvik HK (Norway)	52–44	(Montenegro) ŽRK Budućnost Podgorica	25–20	27–24
Itxako Reyno de Navarra (Spain)	50–45	(Hungary) Győri Audi ETO KC	26–21	24–24

=== First match ===
9 April 2011; 17:15	Larvik HK (Norway)	25–20	(Montenegro) ŽRK Budućnost Podgorica	Arena Larvik, Larvik; Attendance: 2,200; Referees: Guseva, Vartanyan (Russia)
9 April 2011; 17:15	Hammerseng, Larsen 6	(13–10)	Radičević 7	Arena Larvik, Larvik; Attendance: 2,200; Referees: Guseva, Vartanyan (Russia)
9 April 2011; 17:15	3× (yellow card) 1× (suspension)	Report	3× (yellow card) 2× (suspension) 1× (red card)	Arena Larvik, Larvik; Attendance: 2,200; Referees: Guseva, Vartanyan (Russia)

9 April 2011; 19:00	Itxako Reyno de Navarra (Spain)	26–21	(Hungary) Győri Audi ETO KC	Polideportivo Municipal Lizarrerria, Estella-Lizarra; Attendance: 2,200; Referees: Badura, Ondogrecula (Slovakia)
9 April 2011; 19:00	Turey 5	(13–11)	Brădeanu 7	Polideportivo Municipal Lizarrerria, Estella-Lizarra; Attendance: 2,200; Referees: Badura, Ondogrecula (Slovakia)
9 April 2011; 19:00	3× (yellow card) 3× (suspension)	Report	3× (yellow card) 5× (suspension)	Polideportivo Municipal Lizarrerria, Estella-Lizarra; Attendance: 2,200; Referees: Badura, Ondogrecula (Slovakia)

=== Second match ===
17 April 2011; 17:30	Győri Audi ETO KC (Hungary)	24–24	(Spain) Itxako Reyno de Navarra	Magvassy Mihály Sportcsarnok, Győr; Attendance: 2,800; Referees: Krstic, Ljubic (Slovenia)
17 April 2011; 17:30	Görbicz 8	(10–12)	Alonso 7	Magvassy Mihály Sportcsarnok, Győr; Attendance: 2,800; Referees: Krstic, Ljubic (Slovenia)
17 April 2011; 17:30	3× (yellow card) 3× (suspension)	Report	3× (yellow card) 6× (suspension)	Magvassy Mihály Sportcsarnok, Győr; Attendance: 2,800; Referees: Krstic, Ljubic (Slovenia)

17 April 2011; 19:30	ŽRK Budućnost Podgorica (Montenegro)	24–27	(Norway) Larvik HK	Morača Sports Center, Podgorica; Attendance: 4,500; Referees: Bonaventura, Bonaventura (France)
17 April 2011; 19:30	Popović 9	(10–15)	Riegelhuth, Sulland 5	Morača Sports Center, Podgorica; Attendance: 4,500; Referees: Bonaventura, Bonaventura (France)
17 April 2011; 19:30	3× (yellow card) 6× (suspension)	Report	2× (yellow card) 3× (suspension)	Morača Sports Center, Podgorica; Attendance: 4,500; Referees: Bonaventura, Bonaventura (France)

== Final ==
Team 1	Agg.	Team 2	1st leg	2nd leg
Larvik HK (Norway)	47–46	(Spain) Itxako Reyno de Navarra	23–21	24–25

=== First match ===
7 May 2011; 16:45	Larvik HK (Norway)	23–21	(Spain) Itxako Reyno de Navarra	Arena Larvik, Larvik; Attendance: 4,500; Referees: Gubica, Milošević (Croatia)
7 May 2011; 16:45	Larsen 8	(8–9)	Martín, Cabral 5	Arena Larvik, Larvik; Attendance: 4,500; Referees: Gubica, Milošević (Croatia)
7 May 2011; 16:45	2× (yellow card) 1× (suspension)	Report	2× (yellow card)	Arena Larvik, Larvik; Attendance: 4,500; Referees: Gubica, Milošević (Croatia)

=== Second match ===
14 May 2011; 19:15	Itxako Reyno de Navarra (Spain)	25–24	(Norway) Larvik HK	Pabellón Anaitasuna, Pamplona; Attendance: 3,500; Referees: Methe, Methe (Germany)
14 May 2011; 19:15	Martín 10	(10–11)	Sulland 10	Pabellón Anaitasuna, Pamplona; Attendance: 3,500; Referees: Methe, Methe (Germany)
14 May 2011; 19:15	3× (yellow card) 7× (suspension) 1× (red card)	Report	3× (yellow card) 4× (suspension)	Pabellón Anaitasuna, Pamplona; Attendance: 3,500; Referees: Methe, Methe (Germany)

== Top scorers ==
Rank	Name	Team	Goals
1	(Norway) Heidi Løke	(Norway) Larvik HK	99
2	(Hungary) Anita Görbicz	(Hungary) Győri Audi ETO KC	89
3	(Montenegro) Katarina Bulatović	(Montenegro) ŽRK Budućnost Podgorica	85
3	(Montenegro) Bojana Popović	(Montenegro) ŽRK Budućnost Podgorica	85
5	(Portugal) Alexandrina Cabral	(Spain) Itxako Reyno de Navarra	82
6	(Poland) Karolina Kudłacz	(Germany) HC Leipzig	79
7	(Serbia) Andrea Lekić	(Slovenia) RK Krim	72
8	(Montenegro) Jovanka Radičević	(Montenegro) ŽRK Budućnost Podgorica	68
9	(Norway) Nora Mørk	(Norway) Larvik HK	67
10	(Romania) Valentina Ardean-Elisei	(Romania) CS Oltchim Râmnicu Vâlcea	65
