= Cavallari =

Cavallari is a surname. Notable people with the surname include:

- Alberto Cavallari (1927–1998), Italian journalist and writer
- Andrea Cavallari (born 1964), composer and visual artist
- Aristide Cavallari (1849–1914), Patriarch of Venice
- Francesco Saverio Cavallari (1809–1896), architect, professor, painter and archaeologist
- Giulio Cavallari (born 1992), Italian footballer
- Ivan Cavallari (born 1964), artistic ballet director
- Kristin Cavallari (born 1987), American television personality and actress
- Simona Cavallari (actress) (born 1971), Italian actress
- Simona Cavallari (handballer) (born 1992), Swiss women's handball player

== See also ==
- Cavallaro (disambiguation)
- Cavalari
