= Cavallero =

Cavallero is a surname of Italian origin, a cognate of Spanish Caballero, meaning "knight". Notable people with the surname include:

- Alberto Cavallero (1900–1968), Italian long-distance runner
- Héctor Cavallero (1939–2020), Argentine politician
- Martina Cavallero (born 1990), Argentine field hockey player
- Pablo Cavallero (born 1974), Argentine footballer
- Ugo Cavallero (1880–1943), Italian military commander

== See also ==
- Cavallero House, a historic residence in Mobile, Alabama
- Santuario del Cavallero, a sanctuary in Coggiola, Italy
- Cavallaro (disambiguation)
- Cavalero (disambiguation)
- Cavalleri
