= Cavalari =

Cavalari is a surname. Notable people with the surname include:

- Andressa Cavalari Machry (born 1995), Brazilian women's footballer
- Saulo Cavalari (born 1989), Brazilian boxer

== See also ==
- Cavallari
- Cavaleri
- Cavalieri
