= Cavallaro =

Cavallaro may refer to:

== People ==
- Alessandro Cavallaro (born 1980), Italian sprinter
- Carmen Cavallaro (1913–1989), American pianist
- Cosimo Cavallaro (born 1961), Canadian artist, filmmaker and sculptor
- James Cavallaro, American legal scholar
- Salvatore John Cavallaro (1920–1943), US Navy Officer for whom a ship was named
- Vincent Cavallaro (1912–1985), American artist

== Other ==
- USS Cavallaro (APD-128) (1942–2000), US Navy Ship, now decommissioned

== See also ==
- Cavallari
- Cavallero
