= Cavaliero =

Cavaliero is a surname, and may refer to:

- Daniele Cavaliero (born 1984), Italian basketball player
- Glen Cavaliero (1927–2019), English poet and critic
- Rosie Cavaliero, British actress

== See also ==
- Cavalieri, surname
