= Cavalleri =

Cavalleri is a surname. Notable people with the surname include:

- Andrea Cavalleri (born 1969), Italian physicist
- Ferdinando Cavalleri (1794–1867), Italian history and portrait painter
- Fernando Cavalleri (footballer) (1949–2017), Argentine naturalized Chilean football player and manager
- Silvia Cavalleri (born 1972), Italian professional golfer

== Fictional Characters ==
- Jennifer "Jenny" Cavalleri, in the award-winning 1970 film Love Story

== See also ==
- Cavallero
- Cavaleri
