= Lower Dauphin Street Historic District =

Historic district in Alabama, United States

- U.S. National Register of Historic Places
- U.S. Historic district
- Location within Mobile, Alabama Location within Alabama Location within the United States
- Location: Mobile, Alabama
- Coordinates: 30°41′21.80″N 88°2′56.17″W
- Architectural style: Federal, Italianate, Queen Anne, Late 19th and 20th Century Revivals, Late Victorian
- NRHP reference No.: 79000392 (original); 82002059 (increase 1); 95000779 (increase 2); 98001027 (increase 3); 100001307 (increase 4)

Significant dates
- Added to NRHP: February 9, 1979, expanded multiple times thereafter.
- Boundary increases: February 19, 1982; June 30, 1995; August 14, 1998; September 3, 2019

The Lower Dauphin Street Historic District is a historic district in the city of Mobile, Alabama, United States. It was placed on the National Register of Historic Places on February 9, 1979. The district encompasses all of Dauphin Street from Water Street to Jefferson Street. It covers 551 acres (2.23 km^{2}) and contains 736 contributing buildings. The boundaries were increased on February 19, 1982, June 30, 1995, August 14, 1998, and September 3, 2019. The buildings range in age from the 1820s to the 20th century and include the Federal, Greek Revival, Queen Anne, Italianate, and various other Victorian architectural styles.

== Gallery ==
Examples of architecture within the Lower Dauphin Street Historic District:

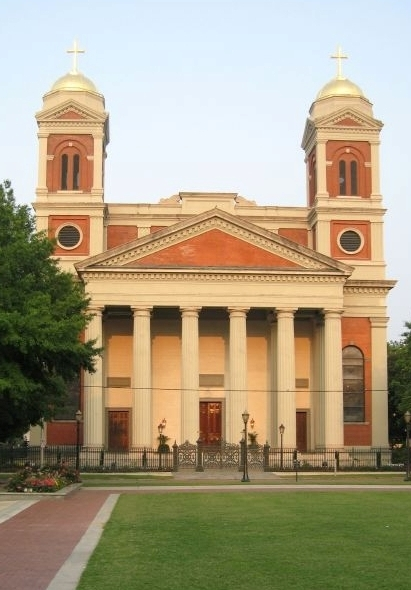
Cathedral of the Immaculate Conception

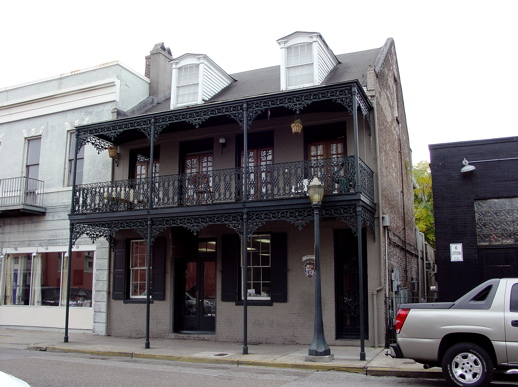
Cavallero House

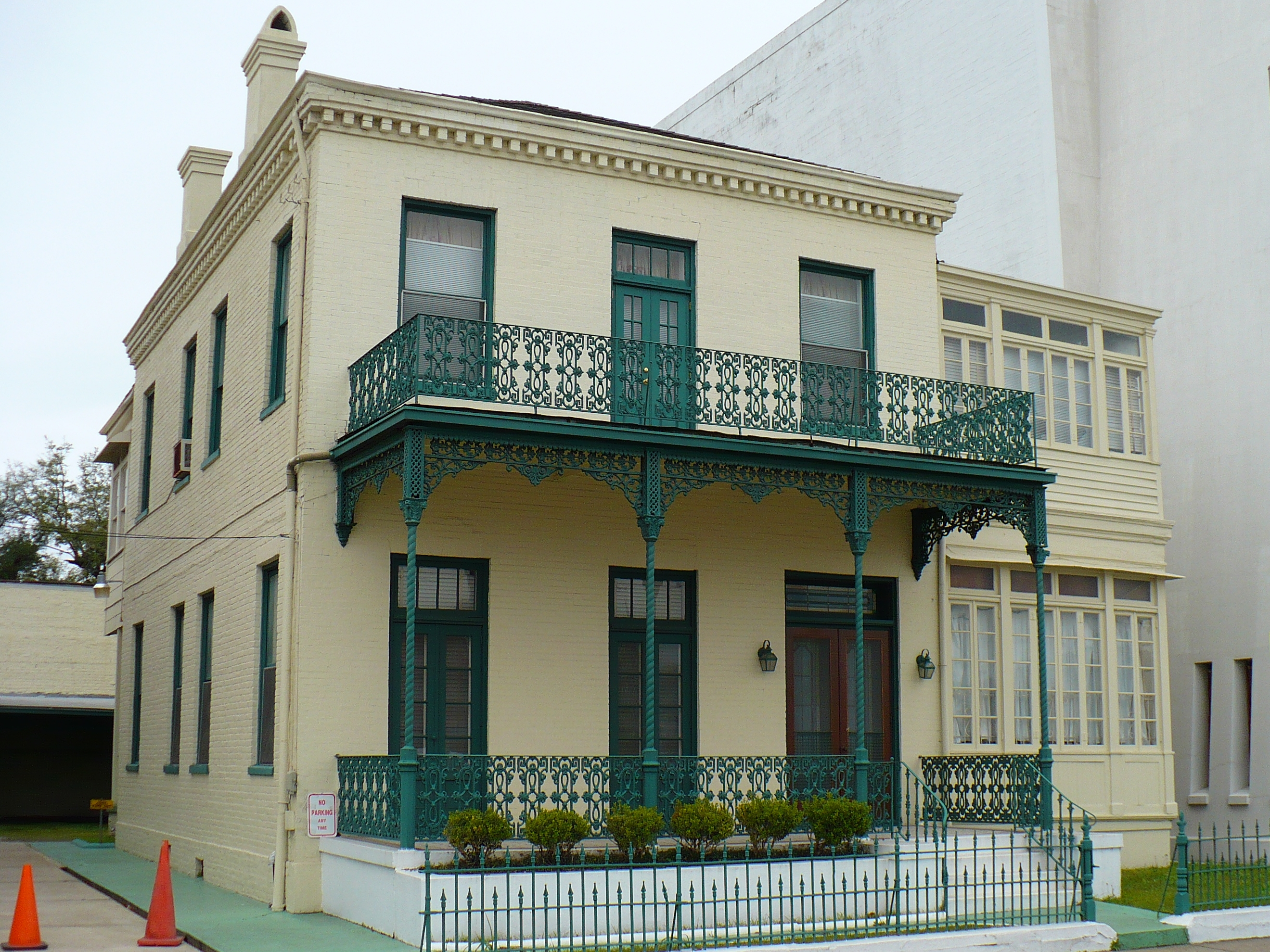
Dahm House

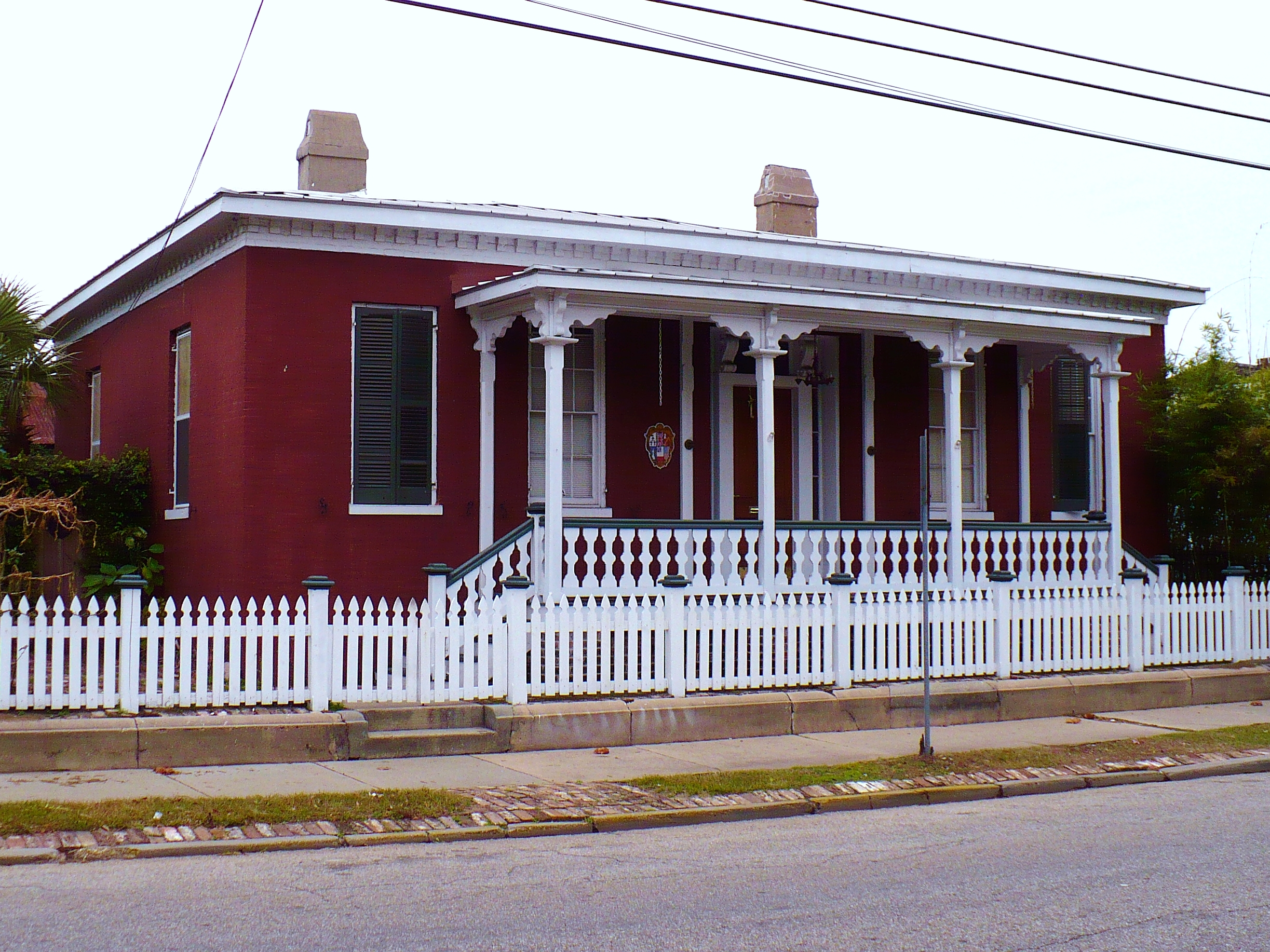
Denby House

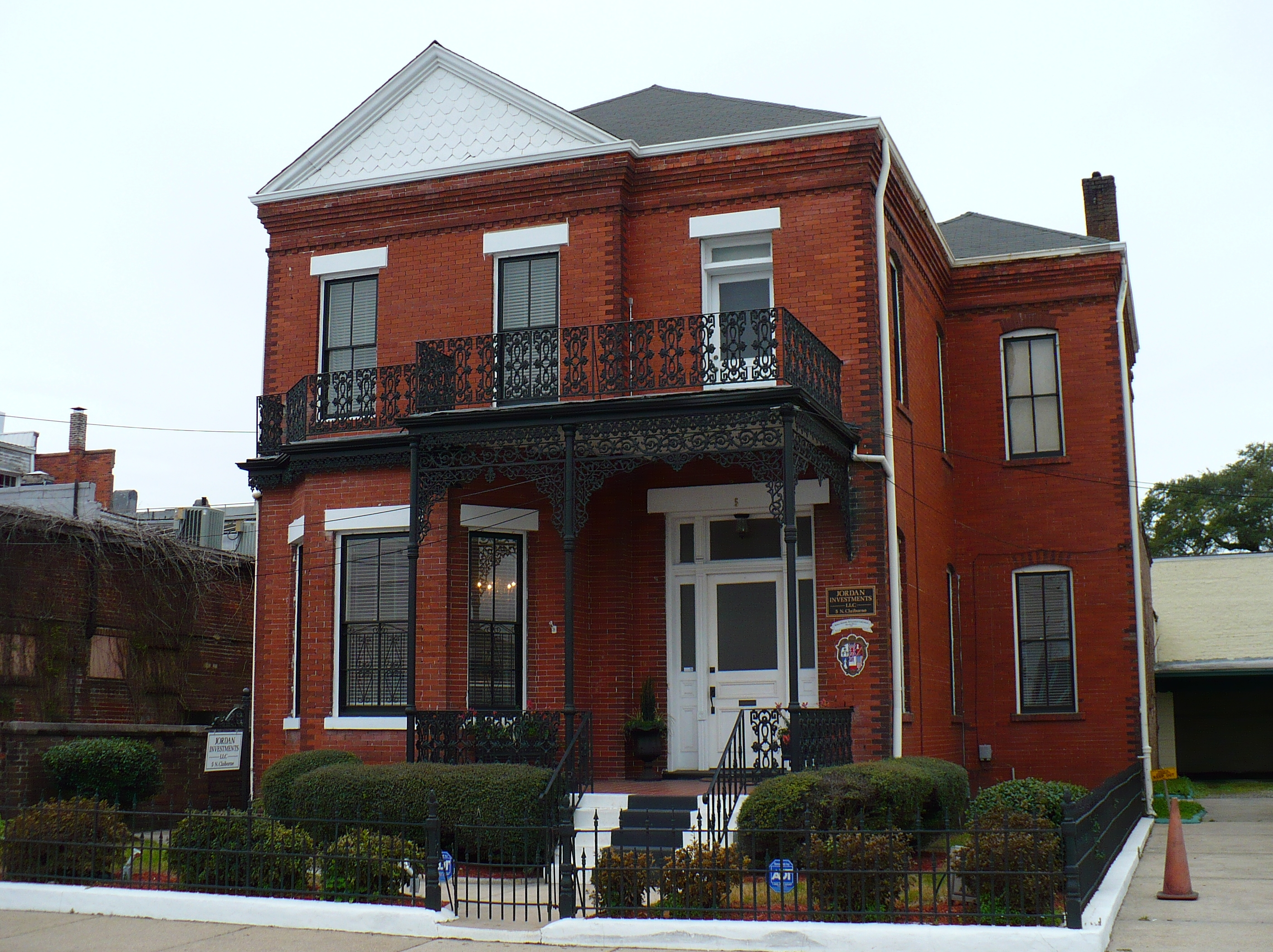
Meaher–Zoghby House

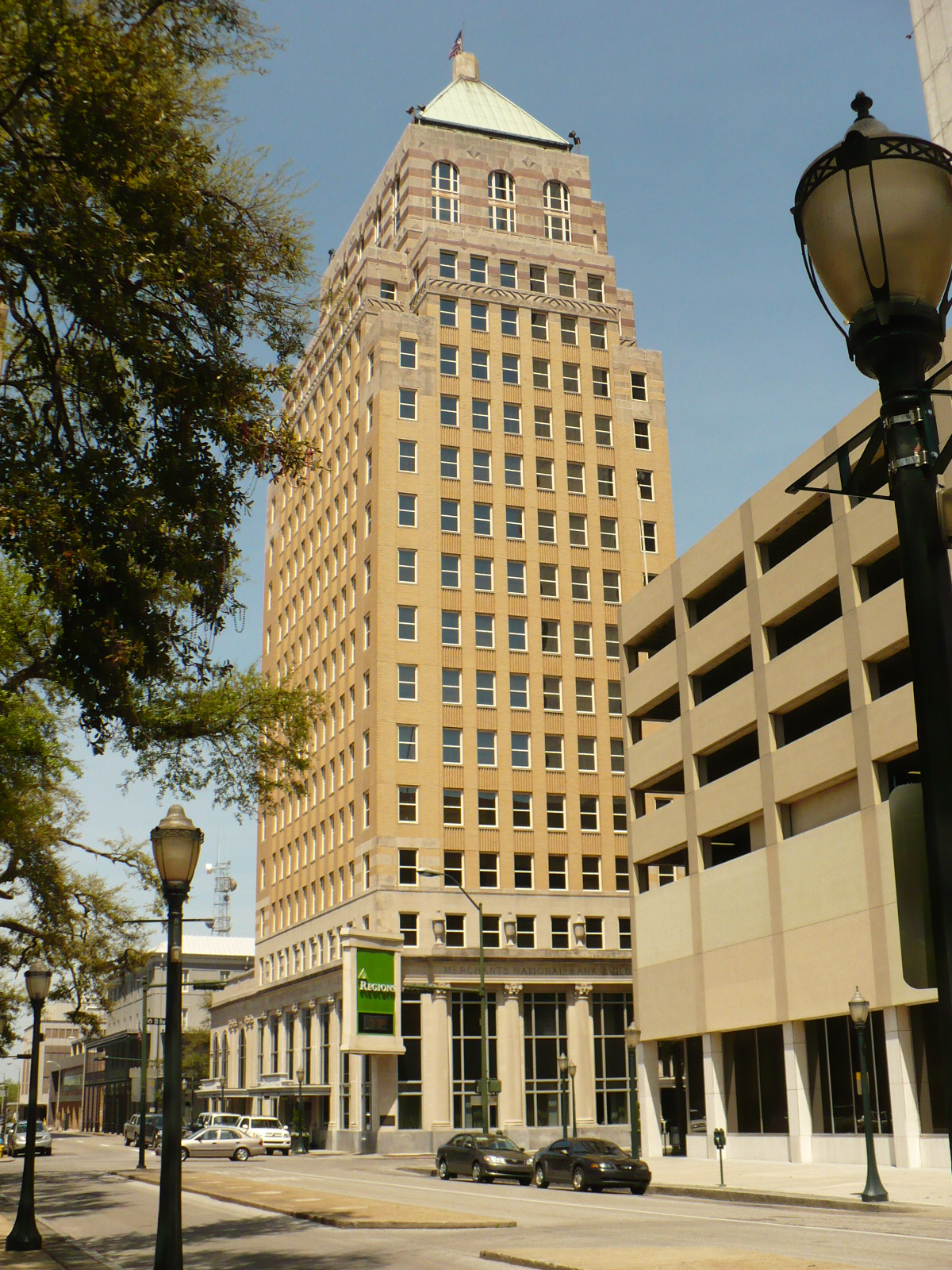
Merchants National Bank Building

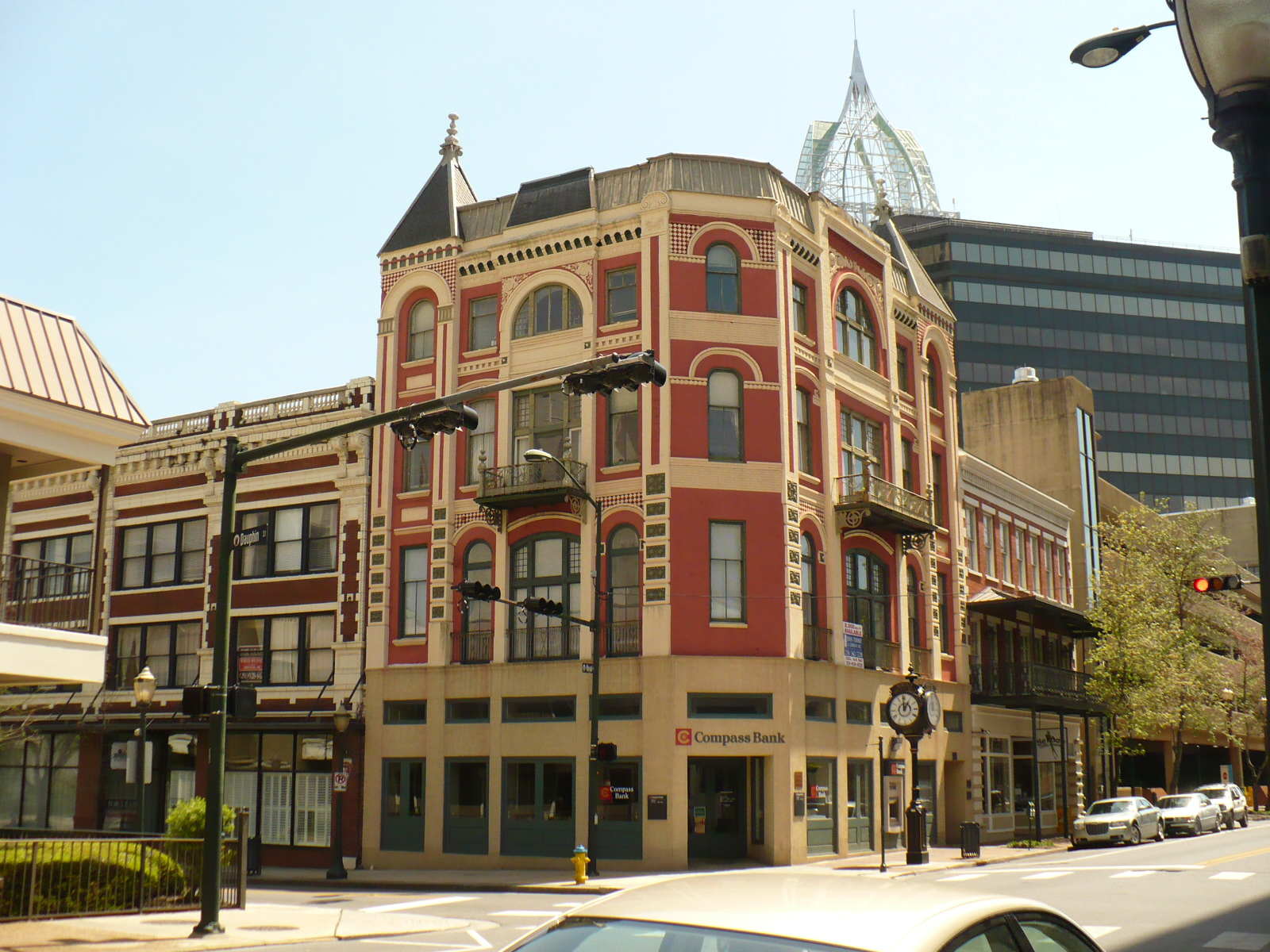
Pincus Building

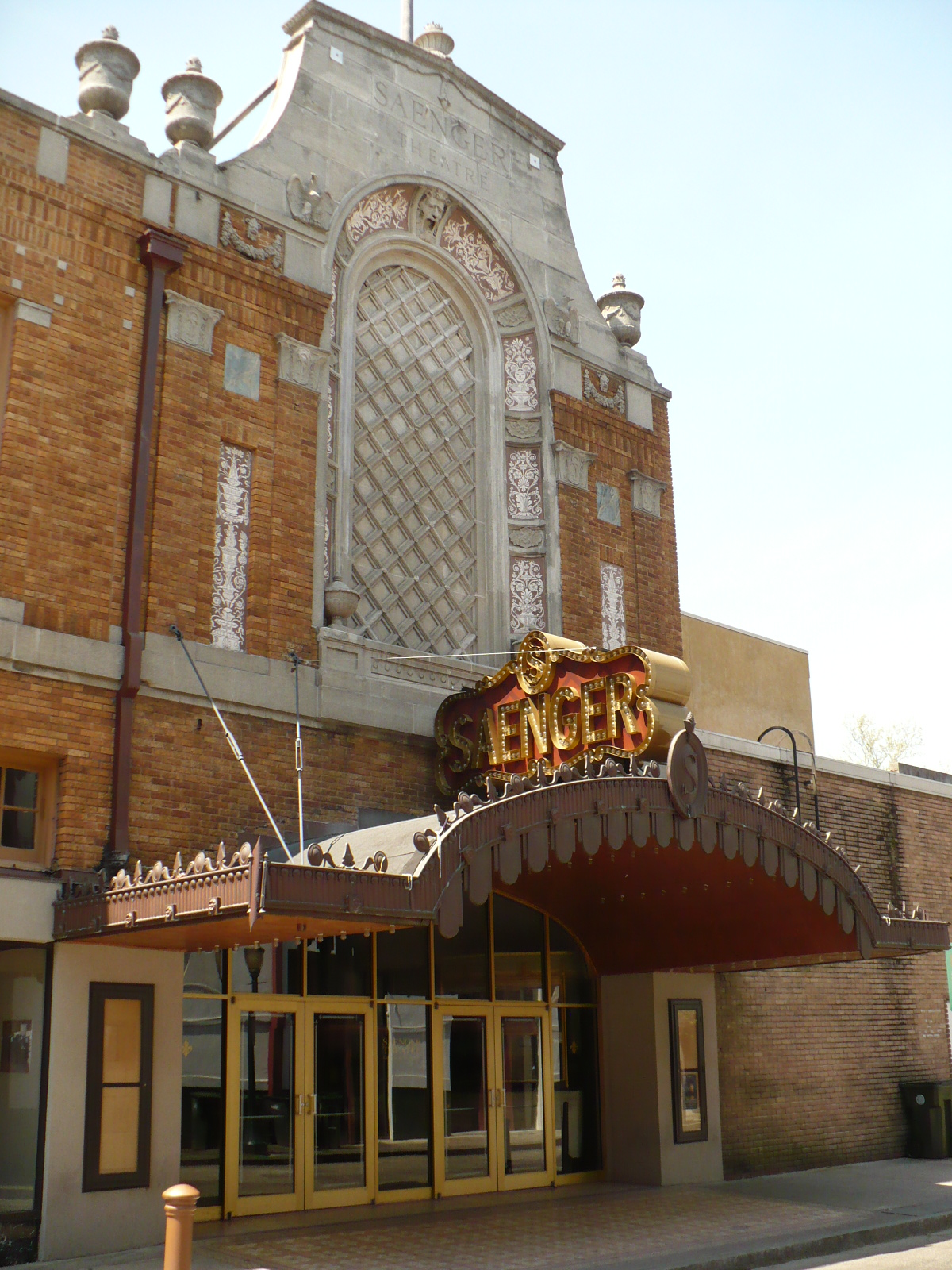
Saenger Theatre

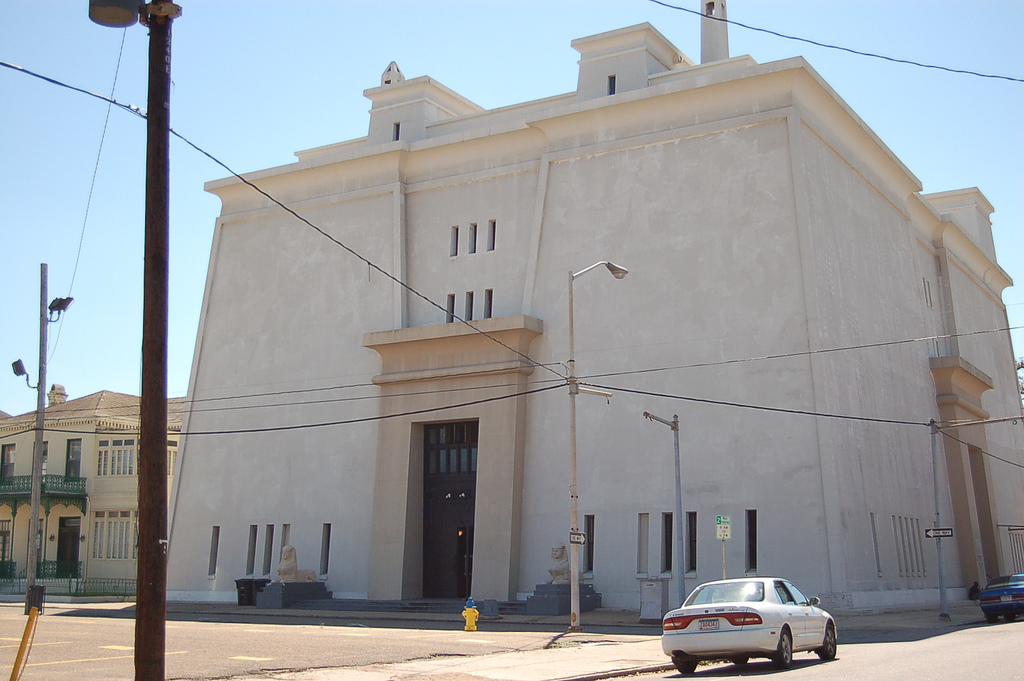
Scottish Rite Temple

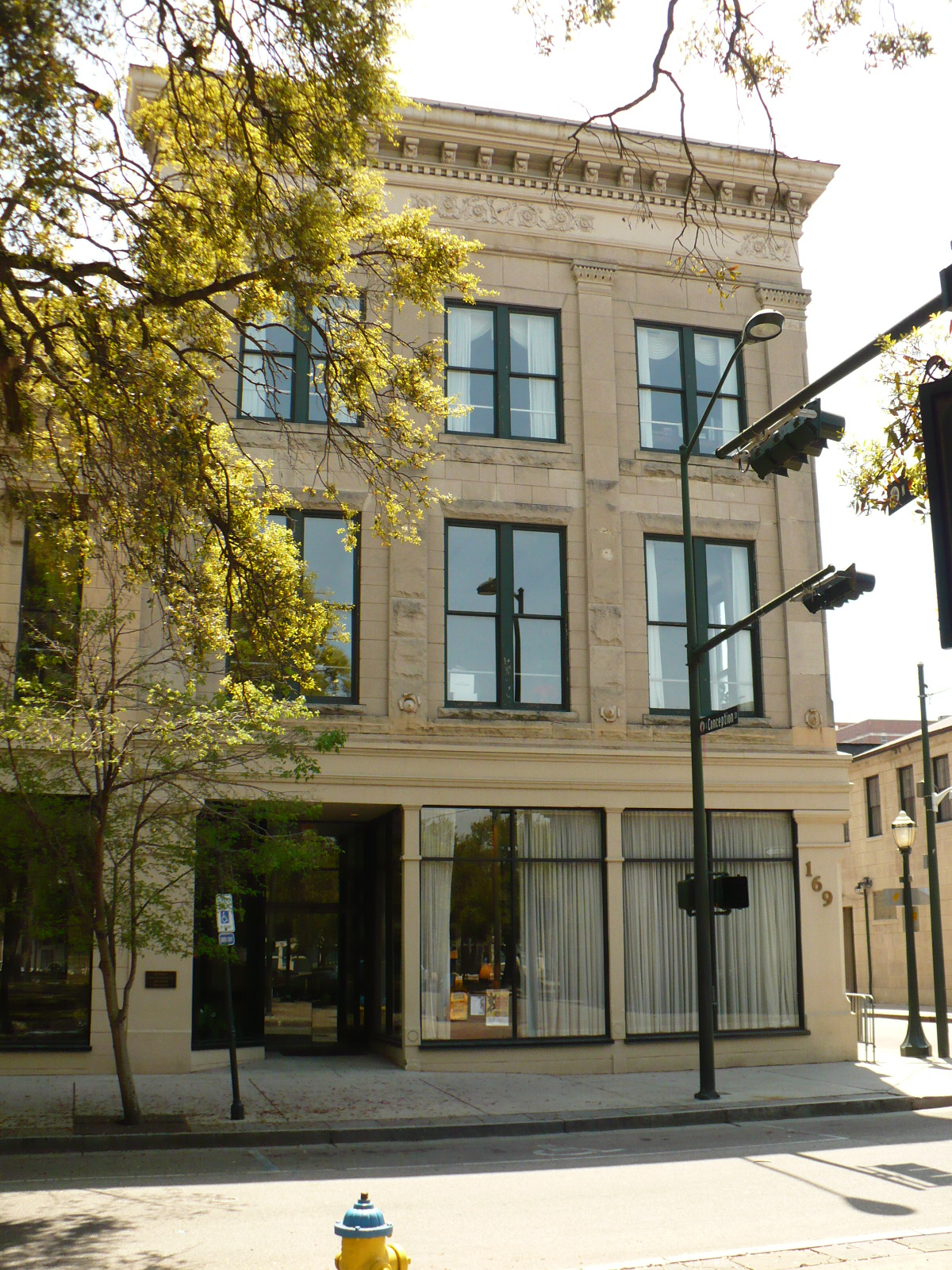
Spira and Pincus Building

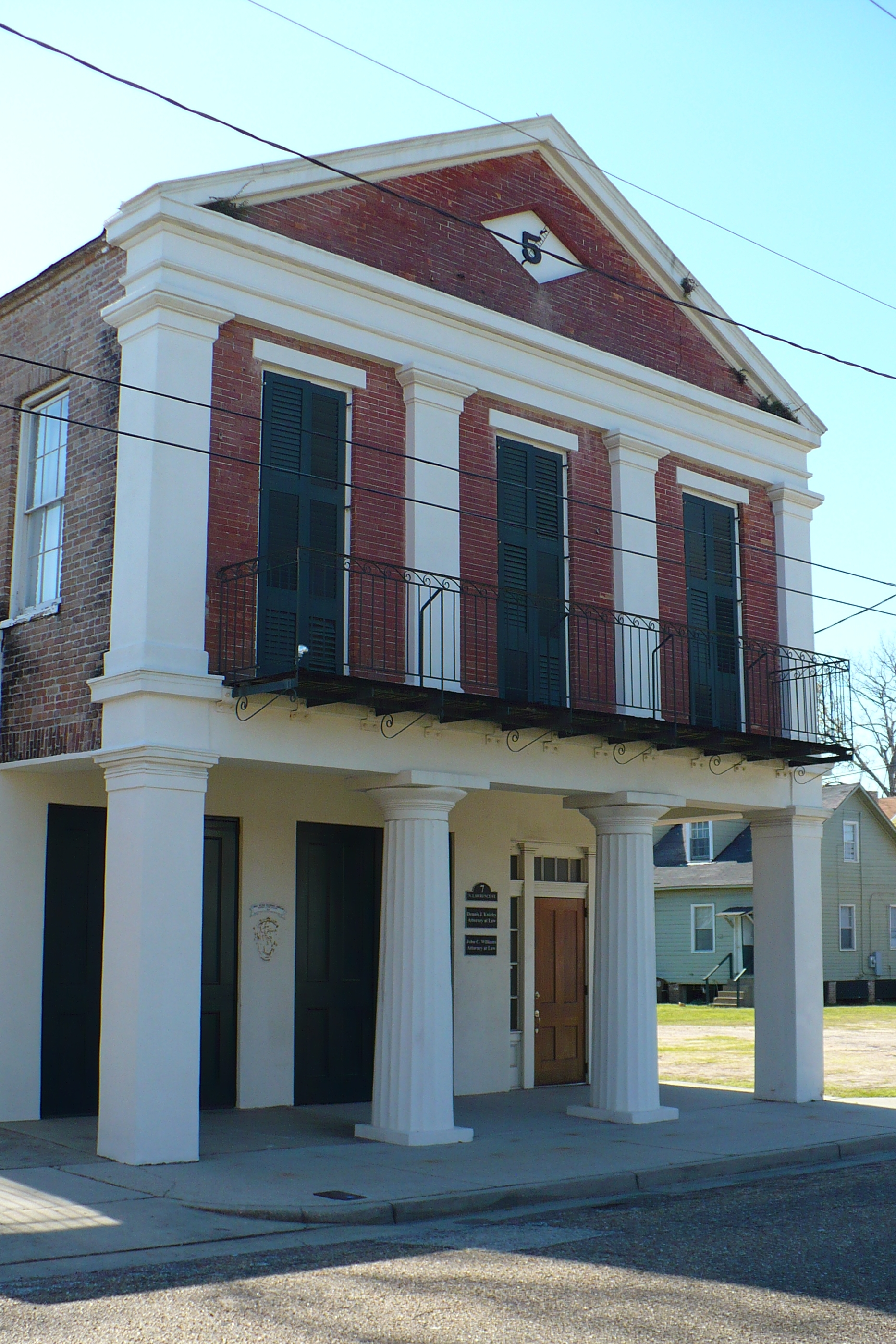
Washington Firehouse No. 5
