= Denby House =

Historic house in Alabama, United States

- U.S. National Register of Historic Places
- U.S. Historic district – Contributing property
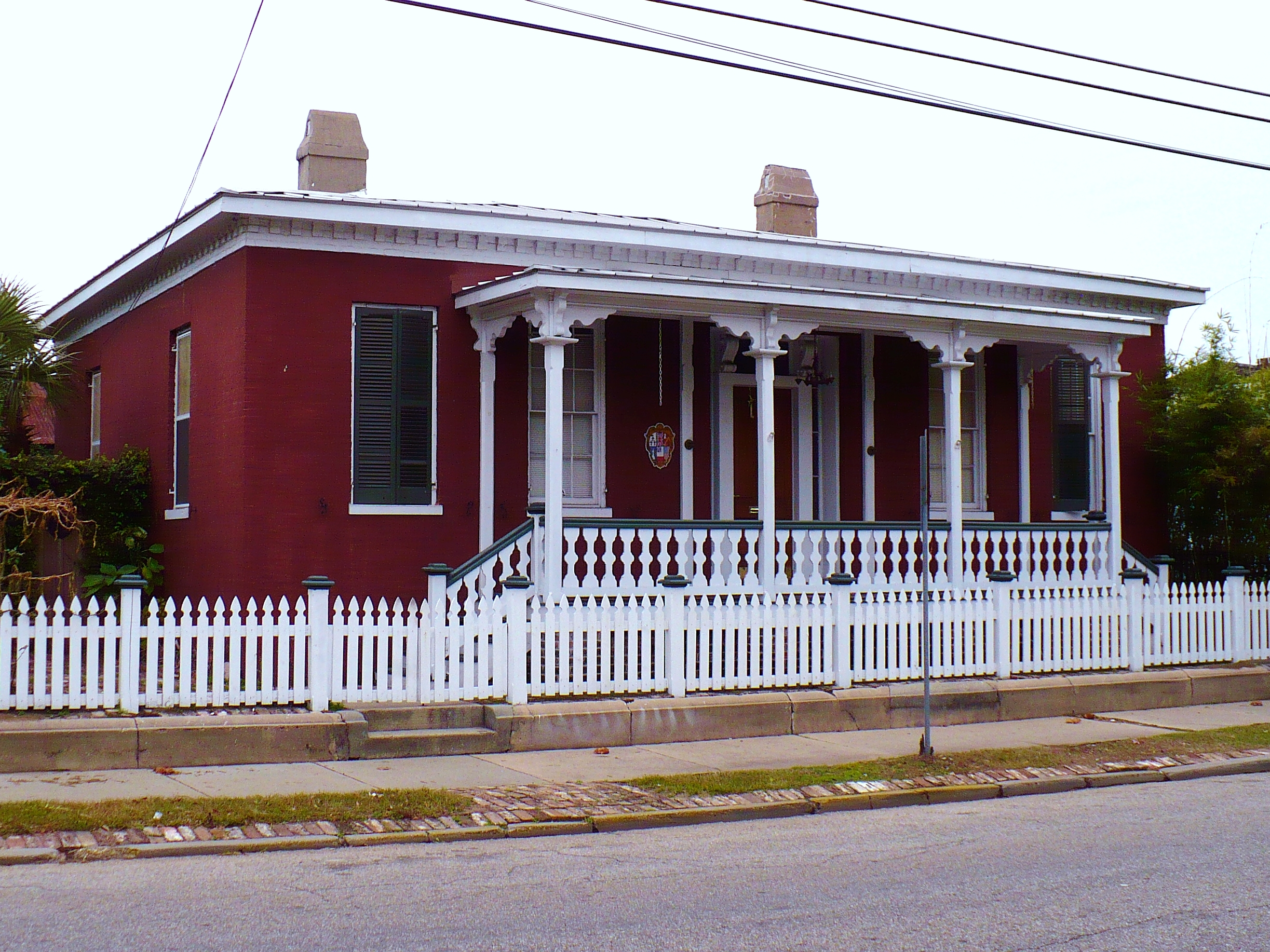
- The Denby House in 2009

- Location within Mobile, Alabama Location within Alabama Location within the United States
- Location: 558 Conti Street, Mobile, Alabama, United States
- Coordinates: 30°41′20″N 88°2′57″W
- Built: 1873
- Architect: Charles Denby
- Part of: Lower Dauphin Street Historic District
- NRHP reference No.: 84000668
- Added to NRHP: January 5, 1984

The Denby House is a historic raised cottage in Mobile, Alabama. The one-story brick house was built by Charles Denby in 1873. It was added to the National Register of Historic Places on January 5, 1984. In addition to being listed individually on the National Register of Historic Places, it is also a contributing building to the Lower Dauphin Street Historic District.
