= Meaher–Zoghby House =

Historic house in Alabama, United States

- U.S. National Register of Historic Places
- U.S. Historic district – Contributing property
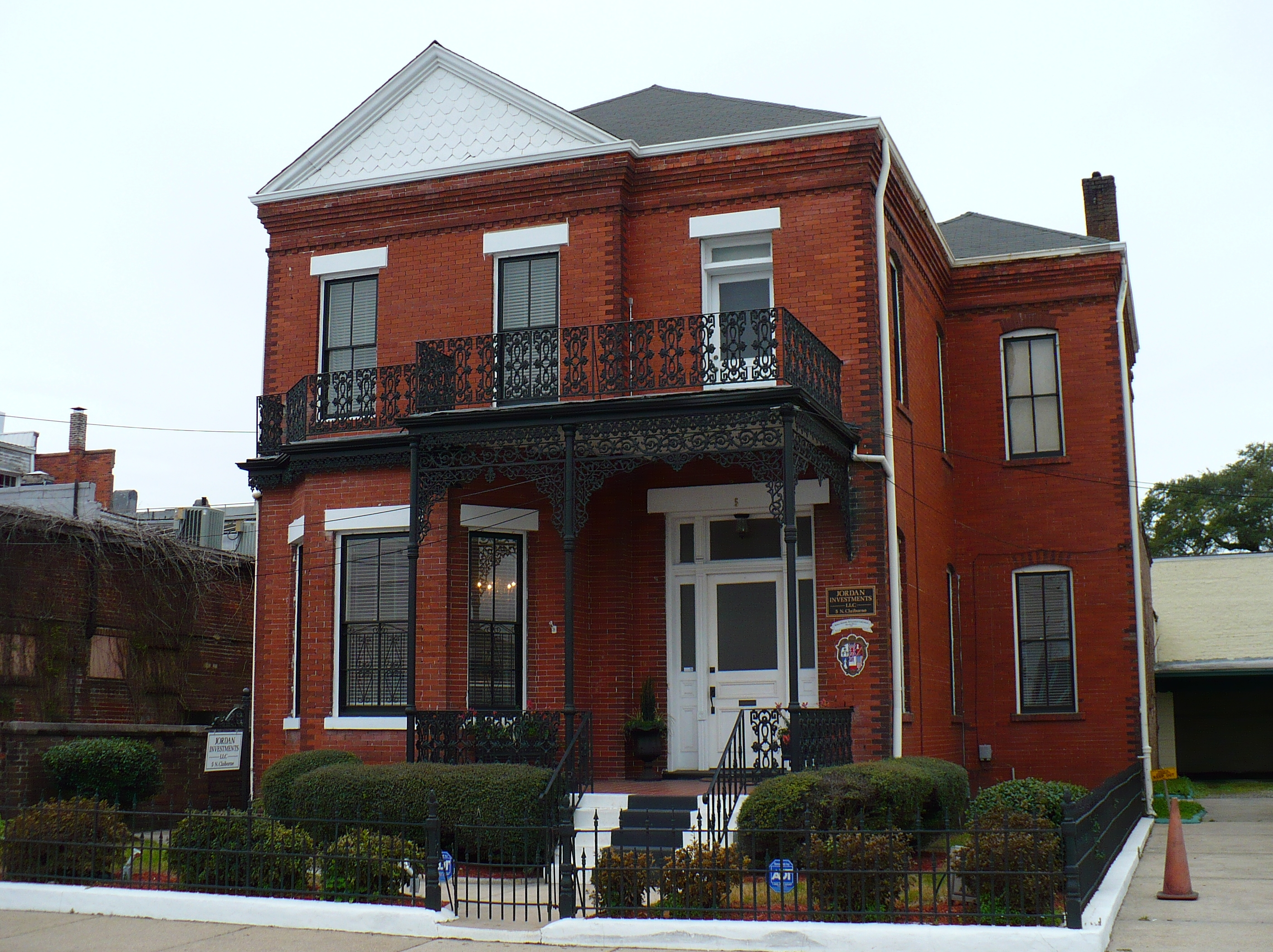
- The Meaher–Zoghby House in 2009

- Location within Mobile, Alabama Location within Alabama Location within the United States
- Location: 5 North Claiborne Street, Mobile, Alabama, United States
- Coordinates: 30°41′27″N 88°2′46″W
- Built: 1901
- Part of: Lower Dauphin Street Historic District
- NRHP reference No.: 84000672
- Added to NRHP: January 5, 1984

The Meaher–Zoghby House is a historic townhouse in Mobile, Alabama. The two-story brick structure was built in 1901 for Augustine Meaher. It retains its original cast iron details and front yard fence. The house was added to the National Register of Historic Places on January 5, 1984. In addition to being listed individually on the National Register of Historic Places, it is also a contributing building to the Lower Dauphin Street Historic District.
