= Dahm House =

Historic house in Alabama, United States

- U.S. National Register of Historic Places
- U.S. Historic district – Contributing property
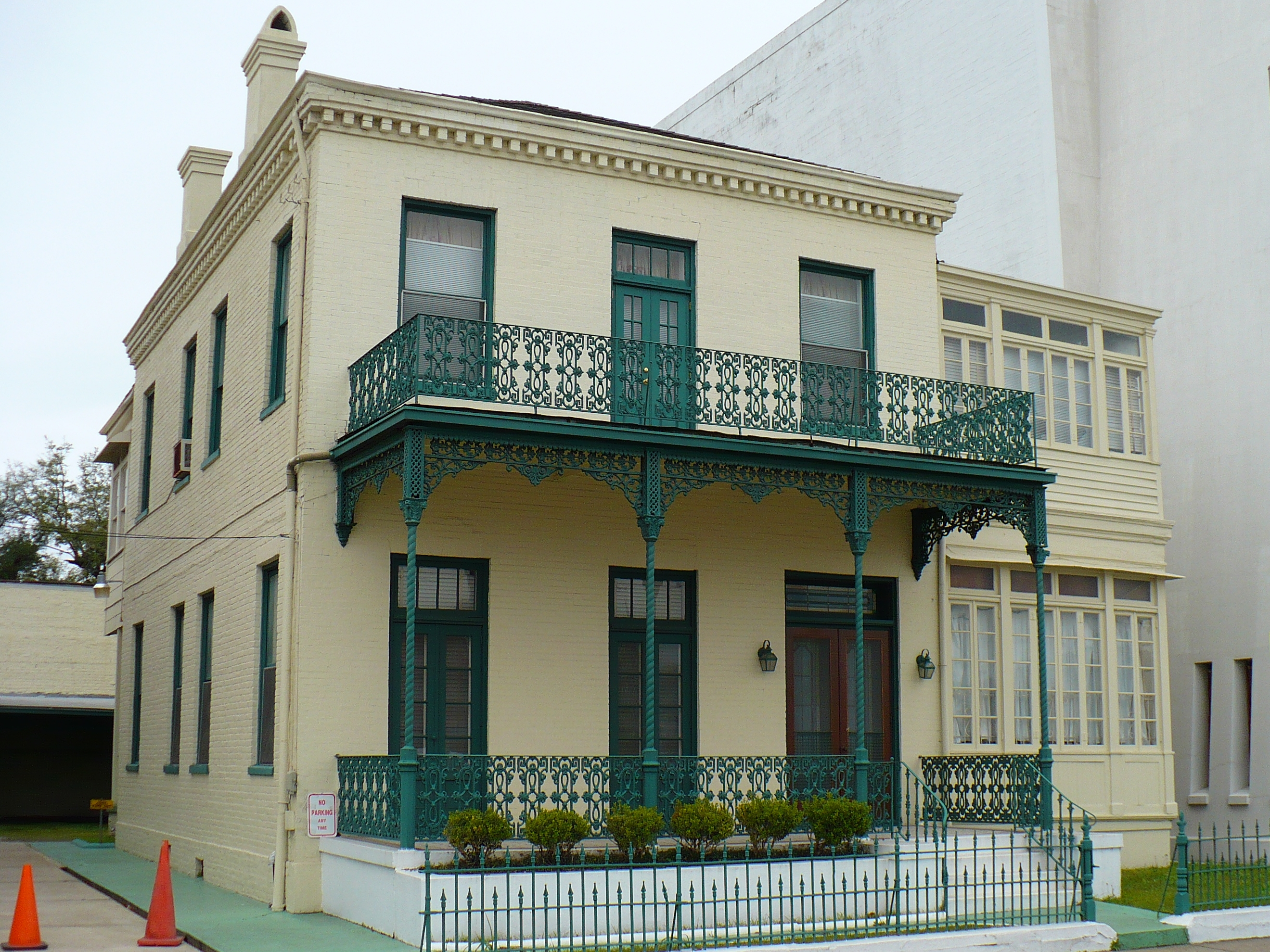
- The Dahm House in 2009

- Location within Mobile, Alabama Location within Alabama Location within the United States
- Location: 7 North Claiborne Street, Mobile, Alabama; United States
- Coordinates: 30°41′28″N 88°2′46″W
- Built: 1873
- Architect: Bassett Capps
- Part of: Lower Dauphin Street Historic District
- NRHP reference No.: 84000665
- Added to NRHP: January 5, 1984

The Dahm House is a historic townhouse in Mobile, Alabama. The two-story brick structure was built in 1873 for John Dahm. It was designed by Bassett Capps. A two-story frame addition was added in 1929. The house was added to the National Register of Historic Places on January 5, 1984. In addition to being listed individually on the National Register of Historic Places, it is also a contributing building to the Lower Dauphin Street Historic District.
