= Cavalero =

Cavalero may refer to:

== Places ==
- Cavalero, Washington, U.S., a census-designated place

== People ==
- René Cavalero (1917–2008), French swimmer and diving equipment manufacturer
- Tony Cavalero (born 1983), American actor and comedian

== Other uses ==
- Cavalero (horse), winner of the 2000 St James's Place Festival Hunter Chase

== See also ==
- Cavaleri, a surname
- Cavallero, a surname
- Cavalier (disambiguation)
