= Cavaleri =

Cavaleri is an occupational surname of Italian origin, meaning "knight". It was also historically used as a patrician title. Notable people with the surname include:

- Ludovico Cavaleri (1867–1942), Italian painter
- Nathan Cavaleri (born 1982), Australian singer-songwriter and guitarist

== See also ==
- Cavaleri (Seville Metro), a train station in Seville, Spain
- Cavaleri String Quartet, a former British string quartet
- Cavalleri
- Cavalari
- Cavalero (disambiguation)
