= USS Cavallaro =

History

United States
- Name: USS Cavallaro
- Namesake: Salvatore John Cavallaro
- Ordered: 1942
- Builder: Defoe Shipbuilding Company, Bay City, Michigan
- Laid down: 28 March 1944
- Launched: 15 June 1944
- Commissioned: 13 March 1945
- Decommissioned: 17 May 1946
- Recommissioned: 4 September 1953
- Decommissioned: 15 October 1959
- Stricken: 15 November 1974
- Fate: Transferred to South Korea, 15 October 1959

South Korea
- Name: ROKS Kyung-Nam (APD-81)
- Acquired: 15 October 1959
- Decommissioned: 29 December 2000
- Fate: Sunk as a target, 2003

General characteristics
- Class & type: Crosley-class high speed transport
- Displacement: 1,450 long tons (1,473 t)
- Length: 306 ft (93 m)
- Beam: 36 ft 10 in (11.23 m)
- Draft: 13 ft 6 in (4.11 m)
- Propulsion: 2 × Combustion Engineering DR boilers; Turbo-electric drive with 2 × General Electric steam turbines; 2 × solid manganese-bronze 3600 lb. 3-bladed propellers, 8 ft 6 in (2.59 m), 7 ft 7 in (2.31 m) pitch; 12,000 hp (8.9 MW); 2 rudders; 359 tons fuel oil
- Speed: 23 knots (43 km/h; 26 mph)
- Range: 3,700 nmi (6,900 km) at 15 kn (28 km/h; 17 mph); 6,000 nmi (11,000 km) at 12 kn (22 km/h; 14 mph)
- Boats & landing craft carried: 4 × LCVPs
- Troops: 162 troops
- Complement: 204 (12 officers, 192 enlisted)
- Armament: 1 × 5"/38 caliber gun; 3 × twin 40 mm guns; 6 × single 20 mm guns; 2 × depth charge tracks

USS Cavallaro (DE-712/APD-128) was a Crosley-class high speed transport of the United States Navy.

== Namesake ==
Salvatore John Cavallaro was born on 6 September 1920 in New York City. He enlisted in the United States Naval Reserve on 6 January 1942, and was commissioned Ensign on 28 January 1943. After training on landing craft, he joined the transport USS Lyon. In the Allied invasion of Sicily, he was assigned to guide the landing of the waves of assault boats, and with skill and courage, under repeated strafing and bombing attacks, carried on throughout the night and early daylight hours of 10 July 1943. Assigned similar duty in the invasion of Salerno Gulf on 9 September 1943, he was killed in action when his LCT was struck by shellfire. He was posthumously awarded the Navy Cross for his service at Sicily.

== Construction and commissioning ==
Cavallaro was laid down by the Defoe Shipbuilding Company in Bay City, Michigan, as a Rudderow-class destroyer escort with the hull number DE-712. She was launched on 15 June 1944, sponsored by Mrs. A. Cavallaro. A few weeks after launching, on 17 July 1944, it was decided that Cavallaro would be completed as a Crosley-class high speed transport, with the designation APD-128. She was commissioned on 13 March 1945.

== Service history ==
=== 1945–1946 ===
Arriving for training at Pearl Harbor on 30 May 1945, Cavallaro sailed on 13 June for convoy escort duty out of Ulithi to the Philippines and Okinawa until 20 September, when she arrived at Sasebo, Japan. She carried men between Japanese ports, and on 12 October departed Tokyo Bay bound for San Francisco, California. After operating along the west coast, she was decommissioned and placed in reserve at San Diego, California, on 17 May 1946.

=== 1953–1959 ===
Cavallaro was recommissioned on 4 September 1953, and after intensive training, sailed for Japan on 12 March 1954. She served as primary control ship in several large amphibious exercises during this tour of duty in the Far East, and transported Underwater Demolition Teams in day and night practice reconnaissance missions. In the fall of 1954, she was stationed at Hai Phong and Saigon, Vietnam, as headquarters for those supervising the debarkation of refugees from Communist North Vietnam carried south by the U.S. Navy in "Operation Passage to Freedom". She returned to San Diego on 23 November.

From March 1955, Cavallaro was homeported at Long Beach, California, conducting operations along the California coast and exercising with Marines. Between 12 January 1956 and 4 October, she served again in the Far East, joining in a re-enactment of the assault on Iwo Jima made for training purposes, and visiting ports in Japan and the Philippines, as well as Hong Kong. Her final cruise to the Orient, between 10 February 1959 and 23 May, found her exercising with both Korean and American Marines. Cavallaro returned to Long Beach to prepare for transfer to the Republic of Korea, and was decommissioned and transferred 15 October 1959.

== ROKS Kyung-Nam (APD-81) ==
She served for forty years in the Republic of Korea Navy as ROKS Kyung-Nam (APD-81). She was decommissioned on 29 December 2000, and sunk as a target in March or April 2003.
