= Anett Sopronyi =

Hungarian handball player (born 1986)

Personal information
- Full name: Anett Karmen Sopronyi
- Nationality: Hungarian
- Born: 27 November 1986 (age 39) Debrecen, Hungary
- Height: 1.78 m (5 ft 10 in)

Sport
- Sport: Handball
- Position: Right Back
- Current club: Retired

Senior clubs
- Years: Team
- 2002–2007: DVSC
- 2003–2004: → Hajdúnánás SC (on loan)
- 2004–2005: → Hajdúnánás SC (on loan)
- 2007–2008: Dunaújváros
- 2008–2009: Nyíradony KK
- 2009–2010: Hódmezőváráshelyi NKC
- 2010–2011: DVSC
- 2011–2012: SD Itxako
- 2012–2013: ŽRK Zaječar
- 2013–2015: DVSC
National team
Years	Team	Apps	(Gls)
2007–2009	Hungary	26	(42)
- Updated on 22 July 2018

Anett Sopronyi (born 27 November 1986 in Debrecen) is a retired Hungarian handballer who most recently played for DVSC and the Hungarian national team.

Sopronyi was spotted by Itxako in the 2010–11 edition of the EHF Champions League, where her former team DVSC faced the Spanish club, and she also made a good impression on the Szabella Cup, where the two sides met again. She was eventually signed by Itxako in December 2011 to cover the right back position, for that they were lack of a left handed player.

In 2015 she decided to retire due to a serious injury.

She made her international debut on 3 March 2007 against Norway, and represented Hungary at two European Championships (2008, 2010).

== Achievements ==
- Nemzeti Bajnokság I:
  - Silver Medallist: 2008, 2011
- Magyar Kupa:
  - Silver Medallist: 2008, 2011
- Youth European Championship:
  - Bronze Medallist: 2003
- World University Championship:
  - Winner: 2010
  - Silver Medallist: 2006, 2008

== Individual awards ==
- Nemzeti Bajnokság I Top Scorer: 2009
