= Hanna Fogelström =

Swedish handball player (born 1990)

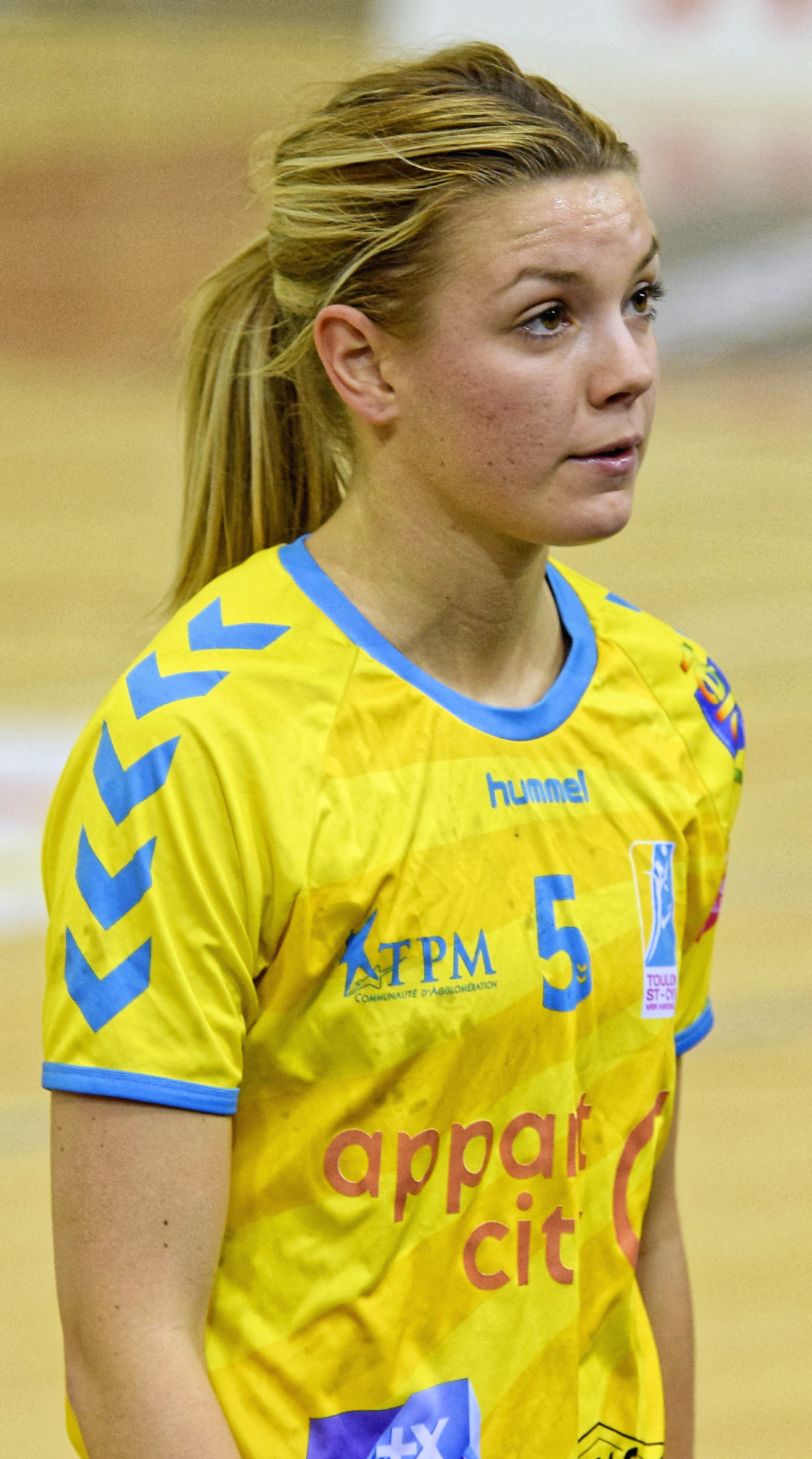

Personal information
- Full name: Hanna Victoria Fogelström
- Nationality: Swedish
- Born: 8 November 1990 (age 35) Partille, Sweden
- Height: 1.79 m (5 ft 10 in)

Sport
- Sport: Handball
- Position: Right wing
- Current club: Retired

Youth career
- Years: Team
- –: IK Sävehof

Senior clubs
- Years: Team
- 2008–2014: IK Sävehof
- 2014–2017: Toulon Handball
National team
Years	Team	Apps	(Gls)
2009–2014	Sweden	68	(112)
Medal record
European Championship
Bronze medal – third place	2014 Croatia/Hungary	Team

Hanna Victoria Fogelström (born 8 November 1990) is a former Swedish former handball player. She played on the Swedish national team with whom she won bronze medals at the 2014 European Championship. She also participated at the 2011 World Women's Handball Championship in Brazil. She was also part of the Swedish squad at the 2012 Summer Olympics.

== Career ==
Fogelström started her career at IK Sävehof, where she won the Swedish Championship in 2009, 2010, 2011, 2012, 2013 and 2014.

In 2014 she joined French team Toulon Handball. In February 2015 she suffered a cruciate ligament injury. Only two games after returning in November she suffered another cruciate ligament injury. In the last game of the 2016-17 season, she had her third injury.

This prevented a planned transfer to Danish club Viborg HK, and instead she retired from playing.

Since 2018 she has been the team leader for her former team IK Sävehof.
