= Cavallero House =

Historic house in Alabama, United States

- U.S. National Register of Historic Places
- U.S. Historic district – Contributing property
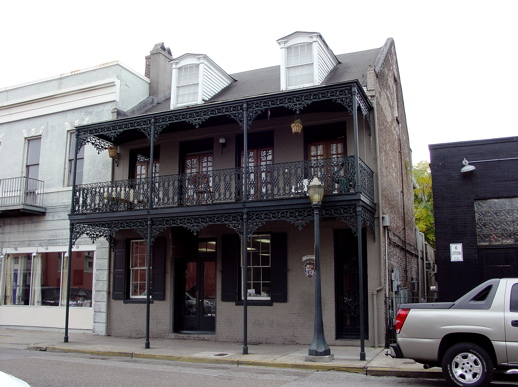
- The Cavallero House at 7 North Jackson Street.

- Location within Mobile, Alabama Location within Alabama Location within the United States
- Location: Mobile, Alabama
- Coordinates: 30°41′27″N 88°2′42″W
- Built: 1835
- Architectural style: Federal
- Part of: Lower Dauphin Street Historic District
- NRHP reference No.: 82001610
- Added to NRHP: October 7, 1982

The Cavallero House is a historic residence in Mobile, Alabama. It was built in 1835 in the Federal style. A cast-iron gallery was added in the mid-19th century. The house was added to the National Register of Historic Places on October 7, 1982. In addition to be individually listed in the National Register, the house is also a contributing building to the Lower Dauphin Street Historic District.
