= Cavalieri =

Cavalieri is an Italian surname. Notable people with the surname include:

- Bonaventura Cavalieri (1598–1647), Italian mathematician
- Caterina Cavalieri (1755–1801), Austrian opera soprano
- Diego Cavalieri (born 1982), Brazilian footballer; goalkeeper for Crystal Palace F.C.
- Emilio de' Cavalieri (1550–1602), Italian composer of the late Renaissance
- Grace Cavalieri (born 1932), American poet and playwright
- Joey Cavalieri, American comic book writer and editor
- Lina Cavalieri (1874–1944), Italian opera soprano
- Paola Cavalieri (born 1950), Italian philosopher
- Tommaso dei Cavalieri (c. 1508–1587), Italian friend of Michelangelo

== See also ==
- Cavalieri's principle
- Cavalieri's quadrature formula
