= Simona Cavallari (handballer) =

Swiss handballer (born 1992)

Personal information
- Nationality: Swiss
- Born: 6 June 1992 (age 34) Zürich, Switzerland
- Height: 1.62 m (5 ft 4 in)

Sport
- Sport: Handball
- Position: Right Wing
- Current club: LK Zug

Senior clubs
- Years: Team
- 2006-2008: TV Thalwil
- 2008-: LK Zug
National team
- Years: Team
- 2011-: Switzerland

Simona Cavallari (born 6 June 1992) is a Swiss handballer. She currently plays for LK Zug in Switzerland and for the Swiss National team.
