= Hungarian handball clubs in European competitions =

- Men's coefficients by season (EHF coefficient)
Season	Points	Rank
2008/09	52.00	6
2009/10	63.89	4 ▲
2010/11	67.33	4
2011/12	65.22	3 ▲
2012/13	51.78	5 ▼
2013/14	43.33	7 ▼
2014/15	46.25	6 ▲
2015/16	74.57	4 ▲
2016/17	103.33	3 ▲
2017/18	119.83	2 ▲
2018/19	106.83	3 ▼
2019/20	86.33	4 ▼
2020/21	99.83	4
2021/22	94.83	4
2022/23	94.17 (in progress)	4

- Women's coefficients by season (EHF coefficient)
Season	Points	Rank
2008/09	97.78	2
2009/10	93.56	3 ▼
2010/11	87.33	3
2011/12	77.56	4 ▼
2012/13	86.44	2 ▲
2013/14	97.78	2
2014/15	109.22	1 ▲
2015/16	112.44	1
2016/17	100.44	2 ▼
2017/18	110.56	2
2018/19	114.13	1 ▲
2019/20	130.00	1
2020/21	162.50	1
2021/22	158.33	1
2022/23	157.67 (in progress)	1

Hungarian handball clubs have entered European handball competitions (EHF Champions League (formerly known as EHF European Cup), EHF European League (formerly known as EHF Cup), EHF European Cup (formerly known as EHF Challenge Cup) and the now defunct EHF Cup Winners' Cup).

== European champions ==
=== Men's ===
Champions League (European Cup)	European League (EHF Cup)	European Cup (Challenge Cup)	Cup Winners Cup
1981/82 – Bp. Honvéd	1985/86 – Győri ETO; 2013/14 – Szeged	None	1991/92 – Veszprém; 2007/08 – Veszprém

=== Women's ===
Champions League (European Cup)	European League (EHF Cup)	European Cup (Challenge Cup)	Cup Winners Cup
1981/82 – Vasas; 1998/99 – Dunaferr; 2012/13 – Győri ETO; 2013/14 – Győri ETO; 2016/17 – Győri ETO; 2017/18 – Győri ETO; 2018/19 – Győri ETO; 2023/24 – Győri ETO; 2024/25 – Győri ETO	1994/95 – Debreceni VSC; 1995/96 – Debreceni VSC; 1997/98 – Dunaferr; 2004/05 – Fehérvár; 2005/06 – Ferencváros; 2015/16 – Dunaújváros; 2018/19 – Siófok KC	None	1978 – Ferencváros; 1980/81 – Bp. Spartacus; 1994/95 – Dunaferr; 2010/11 – Ferencváros; 2011/12 – Ferencváros

== Summary ==
=== Men's summary ===
Current club allocation is as following: 2 clubs (champion and runner-up) for the Champions League group stage or qualifying round, 3 clubs (league 3rd, 4th and 5th placed team or the national cup qualifier) for the EHF European League qualifying rounds.

Season	CH	RU	3rd	4th	5th	6th	7th	CW	CQ
2002–03	VES	SZE	DUN	ETO				VES	CSÖ^{1}
2003–04	VES	SZE	DUN	TAT				VES	NYÍ
2004–05	VES	SZE	DUN	TAT	PLE			VES	
2005–06	VES	SZE	DUN	PLE				SZE	KOM
2006–07	SZE	VES	DUN	PLE	DEB			VES	PLE
2007–08	VES	SZE	DUN	PLE	BÉK	KOM	DEB	SZE	DUN
2008–09	VES	SZE	DUN	PLE				VES	FTC^{1}
2009–10	VES	SZE	TAT	DUN				VES	BAL
2010–11	VES	SZE	FTC^{2}	TAT	BAL			VES	PLE^{2}
2011–12	VES	SZE	BAL					VES	TAT
2012–13	VES	SZE	TAT	CSU				VES	
2013–14	VES	SZE	BAL	CSU	TAT	GYÖ	ORO	VES	TAT
2014–15	VES	SZE	TAT	CSU				VES	
2015–16	VES	SZE	TAT	BAL	CSU			VES	
2016–17	VES	SZE	TAT	BUD	CSU	BAL		VES	
2017–18	SZE	VES	TAT	BAL	KOM			VES	
2018–19	VES	SZE	TAT	BAL	CSU			SZE	
2019–20	Cancelled due to the COVID-19 pandemic.								
2020–21	SZE	VES	TAT	BAL	CSU			VES	
2021–22	SZE	VES	BAL	FTC				VES	VEF
2022–23	VES	SZE	TAT	FTC				VES	
2023–24	VES	SZE	TAT	FTC				VES	
2024–25	VES	SZE	FTC	TAT				SZE	

=== Women's summary ===
Current club allocation is as following: 2 clubs (champion and runner-up) for the Champions League group stage or qualifying round, 3 clubs (league 3rd, 4th, 5th and 6th placed team or the national cup qualifier) for the EHF European League qualifying rounds.

Season	CH	RU	3rd	4th	5th	6th	7th	CW	CQ
2002–03	DUN	FTC	ETO	FEH				FTC	VÁC
2003–04	DUN	ETO	FTC	VÁC	FEH			DUN	VÁC
2004–05	ETO	DUN	FTC	FEH	DEB			ETO	VÁC
2005–06	ETO	FTC	DUN	DEB	FEH	HAL		ETO	FEH
2006–07	FTC	ETO	DUN	FEH	DEB			ETO	
2007–08	ETO	DUN	FTC	FEH	DEB			ETO	
2008–09	ETO	FTC	DEB	BÉK	FEH			ETO	DEB
2009–10	ETO	DEB	VÁC	BÉK				ETO	FTC
2010–11	ETO	DEB	FTC	VÁC	FEH	BÉK		ETO	FEH
2011–12	ETO	FTC	SIÓ	ÉRD	VES	FEH	VÁC	ETO	BÉK
2012–13	ETO	FTC	ÉRD	VÁC	FEH			ETO	VES
2013–14	ETO	FTC	ÉRD	DUN				ETO	SIÓ
2014–15	FTC	ETO	ÉRD	DUN	SIÓ			ETO	ÉRD
2015–16	ETO	FTC	ÉRD	DEB	DUN			ETO	FEH
2016–17	ETO	FTC	ÉRD	DUN	VÁC			FTC	DEB
2017–18	ETO	FTC	ÉRD	DUN	SIÓ	VÁC		ETO	
2018–19	ETO	FTC	SIÓ	ÉRD	VÁC	DEB		ETO	
2019–20	Cancelled due to the COVID-19 pandemic.								
2020–21	FTC	ETO	DEB	MOS	MTK	VÁC		ETO	
2021–22	ETO	FTC	DEB	VÁC	MOS	SIÓ		FTC	
2022–23	ETO	FTC	DEB	MOS	VÁC			FTC	
2023–24	FTC	ETO	MOS	DEB	VÁC			FTC	
2024–25	ETO	FTC	ESZ	DEB	MOS			FTC	

Key to colours

Champions League	European League	Cup Winners' Cup

Notes

- – Historical names shown in brackets according to respective seasons
- (1) Tobol did not apply for Intertoto Cup 2002

== Progress by season ==
=== Men's progress ===
Season	QR	GS	L16	QF	SF	F	QR1	QR2	QR3	GS	QF	SF	F
Season	Champions League						European League						
2024/25
2024/25		VES								TAT			
2024/25		SZE							FTC				
2023/24
2023/24		VES								TAT			
2023/24		SZE											
2022/23
2022/23		SZE								BAL			
2022/23		VES							VEF				
2022/23								FTC					
2021/22
2021/22		SZE								TAT			
2021/22		VES						BAL					
2021/22								CSU					
2020/21
2020/21		VES								TAT			
2020/21		SZE							BAL				
2020/21								GYÖ					
2019/20		VES							TAT				
2019/20		SZE							BAL				
2019/20								CSU					
2018/19		SZE							TAT				
2018/19		VES							BAL				
2018/19								KOM					
2017/18		VES							TAT				
2017/18		SZE							BUD				
2017/18								CSU					
2017/18								BAL					
2016/17		VES							TAT				
2016/17		SZE						BAL					
2016/17							CSU						
2015/16		VES							TAT				
2015/16		SZE						CSU					
2014/15		VES						BAL					
2014/15		SZE						TAT					
2014/15							ORO						
2013/14		VES							SZE				
2013/14	SZE							CSU					
2013/14							TAT						
2012/13		VES						TAT					
2012/13		SZE					BAL						

=== Women's progress ===
Season	QR	GS	MR	QF	SF	F	QR1	QR2	QR3	GS	QF	SF	F
Season	Champions League						European League						
2024/25
2024/25		FTC								MOS			
2024/25		ETO								DEB			
2024/25								VÁC					
2023/24
2023/24		ETO								MOS			
2023/24		FTC							VÁC				
2023/24		DEB											
2022/23
2022/23		ETO								DEB			
2022/23		FTC							MOS				
2022/23									VÁC				
2022/23								SIÓ					
2021/22
2021/22		FTC								MOS			
2021/22		ETO							DEB				
2021/22									VÁC				
2021/22								MTK					
2020/21
2020/21		ETO								SIÓ			
2020/21		FTC							DEB				
2020/21									VÁC				
2020/21								FEH					
2019/20
2019/20		ETO							SIÓ				
2019/20		FTC							ÉRD				
2019/20								VÁC					
2019/20								DEB					
2018/19		ETO							ÉRD				
2018/19		FTC						DUN					
2018/19								SIÓ					
2018/19							VÁC						
2017/18		ETO							ÉRD				
2017/18		FTC						DUN					
2017/18								DEB					
2017/18							VÁC						
2016/17		ETO							DUN				
2016/17		FTC						ÉRD					
2016/17								DEB					
2016/17							FEH						

== Full European record ==
=== Men's record ===
==== EHF Champions League/European Cup ====
The competition was named European Cup until 1992/93, until it switched its name to EHF Champions League.

Year	Team	Progress	Aggregate	Opponents	Results
1961/62	Bp. Spartacus	First round	wo.	(Poland) Śląsk Wrocław	
1962/63	Bp. Spartacus	Round of 16	11–24	(Romania) Dinamo București	
1964/65	Bp. Honvéd	First round	wo.	(Poland) AZS Wrocław	
1965/66	Bp. Honvéd	Final	14–16	(East Germany) DHfK Leipzig	
1966/67	Bp. Honvéd	Quarter-finals	32–36	(Soviet Union) Cuncevo	19-21 at home, 13-15 at away
1967/68	Bp. Honvéd	Round of 16	34–43	(Czechoslovakia) Dukla Prague	22-18 at home, 12-25 at away
1969/70	Bp. Honvéd	Quarter-finals	40–44	(Romania) Steaua București	20-18 at home, 20-26 at away
1970/71	Elektromos	First round	22–32	(Sweden) SoIK Hellas	13-17 at home, 9-15 at away
1972/73	Elektromos	First round	29–40	(Bulgaria) VIF Dimitrov Sofia	13-12 at home, 16-28 at away
1973/74	Bp. Honvéd	Quarter-finals	26–32	(Soviet Union) MAI Moscow	13-10 at home, 13-22 at away
1974/75	Bp. Spartacus	Quarter-finals	28–34	(West Germany) VfL Gummersbach	15-15 at home, 13-19 at away
1976/77	Debreceni Dózsa	Quarter-finals	45–62	(Denmark) Fredericia KFUM	28-31 at home, 17-31 at away
1977/78	Bp. Honvéd	Semi-finals	38–41	(East Germany) Magdeburg	21-22 at home, 17-19 at away
1978/79	Bp. Honvéd	Semi-finals	36–42	(West Germany) TV Großwallstadt	27-24 at home, 9-18 at away
1979/80	Tatabánya	Quarter-finals	40–41	(Czechoslovakia) Dukla Prague	19-18 at home, 21-23 at away
1980/81	Tatabánya	Round of 16	43–43 (a)	(Iceland) Vikingur Reykjavik	23-22 at home, 20-21 at away
1981/82	Bp. Honvéd	Winners	49–34	(Switzerland) TSV St. Otmar	25-16 at home, 24-18 at away
1982/83	Bp. Honvéd	Quarter-finals	39–47	(Socialist Federal Republic of Yugoslavia) Metaloplastika	19-15 at home, 20-32 at away
1982/83	Veszprém	Round of 16	44–61	(Soviet Union) CSKA Moscow	25-30 at home, 19-31 at away
1983/84	Bp. Honvéd	Semi-finals	41–54	(Socialist Federal Republic of Yugoslavia) Metaloplastika	20-24 at home, 21-30 at away
1984/85	Bp. Honvéd	Round of 16	51–53	(Iceland) FH Hafnarfjörður	29-27 at home, 22-26 at away
1985/86	Tatabánya	Round of 16	47–53	(Czechoslovakia) Dukla Prague	24-24 at home, 23-29 at away
1986/87	Veszprém	Round of 16	43–56	(East Germany) Empor Rostock	23-26 at home, 20-30 at away
1987/88	Veszprém	Round of 16	36–46	(Soviet Union) CSKA Moscow	22-22 at home, 14-24 at away
1988/89	Győri ETO	Round of 16	41–45	(Sweden) HK Drott	23-22 at home, 18-23 at away
1989/90	Győri ETO	Quarter-finals	43–60	(Soviet Union) SKA Minsk	21-29 at home, 22-31 at away
1990/91	Győri ETO	First round	42–46	(Romania) Steaua București	21-20 at home, 21-26 at away
1991/92	Elektromos	Quarter-finals	42–58	(Spain) Santander	24-28 at home, 18-30 at away
1992/93	Elektromos	Quarter-finals	41–42	(France) Vénissieux	27-22 at home, 14-20 at away
1993/94	Veszprém	Round of 16	42–48	(Spain) Santander	29-26 at home, 16-25 at away
1994/95	Veszprém	3rd in Group stage	N/A	(Croatia) Zagreb, (Spain) Santander, (Denmark) KIF Kolding	
1995/96	Veszprém	3rd in Group stage	N/A	(Spain) Bidasoa Irun, (Germany) THW Kiel, (Portugal) ABC Braga	
1996/97	Szeged	Quarter-finals	42–66	(Spain) Barcelona	25-26 at home, 17-40 at away
1997/98	Veszprém	Quarter-finals	60–60 (a)	(Spain) Barcelona	33-28 at home, 27-32 at away
1998/99	Veszprém	Quarter-finals	53–58	(Spain) Barcelona	29-29 at home, 24-29 at away
1999/00	Veszprém	Quarter-finals	53–55	(Croatia) Zagreb	27-25 at home, 26-30 at away
2000/01	Dunaferr	3rd in Group stage	N/A	(Spain) Barcelona, (France) Montpellier, (Poland) Wybrzeże Gdańsk	
2001/02	Veszprém	Finals	48–51	(Germany) Magdeburg	23-21 at home, 25-30 at away
2002/03	Veszprém	Semi-finals	50–54	(Spain) San Antonio	30-26 at home, 20-28 at away
2003/04	Veszprém	Quarter-finals	49–61	(Spain) Ciudad Real	25-28 at home, 24-33 at away
2003/04	Szeged	Quarter-finals	54–59	(Germany) Magdeburg	30-31 at home, 24-28 at away
2004/05	Veszprém	Quarter-finals	55–63	(Spain) Ciudad Real	33-34 at home, 22-29 at away
2004/05	Szeged	Round of 16	43–44	(Slovenia) Celje	20-21 at home, 23-23 at away
2005/06	Veszprém	Semi-finals	58–59	(Spain) San Antonio	29-27 at home, 29-32 at away
2005/06	Szeged	Round of 16	58–68	(Spain) Ciudad Real	31-32 at home, 27-36 at away
2006/07	Veszprém	Quarter-finals	71–75	(Germany) THW Kiel	39-36 at home, 32-39 at away
2006/07	Szeged	Round of 16	49–50	(Spain) Valladolid	25-25 at home, 24-25 at away
2007/08	Szeged	3rd in Main round	N/A	(Spain) Barcelona, (Denmark) GOG Svendborg, (Slovenia) Celje	
2007/08	Veszprém	3rd in Group stage (to CWC)	N/A	(Germany) VfL Gummersbach, (Slovenia) Celje, (Iceland) Valur	
2008/09	Veszprém	Quarter-finals	56–58	(Spain) Ciudad Real	32-29 at home, 24-29 at away
2008/09	Szeged	3rd in Group stage (to CWC)	N/A	(Germany) Rhein-Neckar Löwen, (Croatia) Zagreb, (Poland) Wisła Płock	
2009/10	Veszprém	Quarter-finals	60–67	(Spain) Barcelona	33-34 at home, 27-33 at away
2009/10	Szeged	5th in Group stage	N/A	(France) Montpellier, (Russia) Chekhovskiye Medvedi, (Spain) Valladolid, (Romania) HCM Constanța, (Greece) PAOK	
2010/11	Veszprém	Round of 16	51–54	(Spain) Barcelona	30-26 at home, 21-28 at away
2010/11	Szeged	Round of 16	46–60	(Germany) Flensburg-Handewitt	26-27 at home, 20-33 at away
2011/12	Veszprém	Round of 16	55–56	(Spain) Ademar León	27-25 at home, 28-31 at away
2011/12	Szeged	5th in Group stage	N/A	(Germany) THW Kiel, (Denmark) AG København, (Spain) Ademar León, (France) Montpellier, (Serbia) Partizan	
2012/13	Veszprém	Quarter-finals	59–61	(Germany) THW Kiel	28-29 at home, 31-32 at away
2012/13	Szeged	Round of 16	53–57	(Poland) Kielce	26-25 at home, 27-32 at away
2013/14	Veszprém	Fourth place	25–26	(Spain) Barcelona	
2013/14	Szeged	Wildcard qualification (to EHF)	39–45	(North Macedonia) Metalurg	23-19 at home, 16-26 at away
2014/15	Veszprém	Final	23–28	(Spain) Barcelona	
2014/15	Szeged	Quarter-finals	54–60	(Germany) THW Kiel	31-29 at home, 23-31 at away
2015/16	Veszprém	Final	35–35 (3-4 p)	(Poland) Kielce	
2015/16	Szeged	Round of 16	62–65	(Germany) THW Kiel	33-29 at home, 29-26 at away
2016/17	Veszprém	Third place	34–30	(Spain) Barcelona	
2016/17	Szeged	Quarter-finals	57–60	(France) Paris Saint-Germain	27-30 at home, 30-30 at away
2017/18	Veszprém	Round of 16	59–61	(Denmark) Skjern	34-29 at home, 25-32 at away
2017/18	Szeged	Round of 16	50–56	(Germany) THW Kiel	28-27 at home, 22-29 at away
2018/19	Szeged	Quarter-finals	52–56	(North Macedonia) Vardar	29-25 at home, 23-31 at away
2018/19	Veszprém	Final	24–27	(North Macedonia) Vardar	
2019/20	Veszprém	Third-place match	26–31	(France) Paris Saint-Germain	
2019/20	Szeged	Quarter-finals	–	(North Macedonia) Vardar	Cancelled due to COVID-19
2020/21	Veszprém	Quarter-finals	60–62	(France) HBC Nantes	32–30 at home, 28–32 at away
2020/21	Szeged	Play-offs	56–66	(Germany) THW Kiel	28–33 at home, 28–33 at away
2021/22	Szeged	Play-offs	57–60	(Germany) SG Flensburg Handewitt	36–35 at home, 21–25 at away
2021/22	Veszprém	Fourth place	34–34 (1–3) (p)	(Germany) THW Kiel	
2022/23	Szeged	Playoffs	56–74	(Hungary) Veszprém KC	23–36 at home, 33–38 at away
2022/23	Veszprém	Quarter-finals	56–60	(Poland) Barlinek Industria Kielce	29–29 at home, 27–31 at away
2023/24	Veszprém	Quarter-finals	60–64	(Denmark) Aalborg Håndbold	32–31 at home, 28–33 at away
2023/24	Szeged	Playoffs	62–76	(Hungary) Veszprém KC	30–37 at home, 32–39 at away
2024/25	Veszprém	Quarter-finals	53–54	(Germany) SC Magdeburg	28-27 at home, 26-26 at away
2024/25	Szeged	Quarter-finals	54–56	(Spain) Barcelona	24-27 at home, 30-29 at away

==== EHF European Handball League/EHF Cup/IHF Cup ====
While the IHF Cup (1981–1993) is recognised as the predecessor to the EHF Cup, it was not organised by EHF.

Year	Team	Progress	Aggregate	Opponents	Results
1981/82	Tatabánya	Round of 16	50–50 (a)	(East Germany) Leipzig	30-23 at home, 20-27 at away
1982/83	Tatabánya	Quarter-finals	44–55	(Soviet Union) ZTR Zaporizhzhia	26-26 at home, 18-29 at away
1983/84	Tatabánya	Semi-finals	43–44	(West Germany) TV Großwallstadt	23-22 at home, 20-22 at away
1984/85	Szeged	Round of 16	55–62	(Spain) Alicante	31-33 at home, 24-29 at away
1985/86	Győri ETO	Winners	43–41	(Spain) Alicante	23-17 at home, 20-24 at away
1986/87	Szeged	Round of 16	40–44	(Czechoslovakia) Slavia Prague	22-21 at home, 18-23 at away
1987/88	Szeged	First round	39–53	(Bulgaria) VIF Dimitrov Sofia	23-28 at home, 16-25 at away
1988/89	Debreceni Dózsa	First round	39–53	(Belgium) Initia Hasselt	18-15 at home, 11-15 at away
1989/90	Tatabánya	First round	47–58	(Czechoslovakia) Dukla Prague	22-20 at home, 25-38 at away
1990/91	Szeged	First round	43–44	(Romania) Minaur Baia Mare	27-21 at home, 16-23 at away
1991/92	Bp. Honvéd	First round	33–37	(Poland) Wisła Płock	17-14 at home, 16-23 at away
1992/93	Szeged	First round	42–43	(Romania) Steaua București	21-16 at home, 21-27 at away
1993/94	Elektromos	Quarter-finals	42–46	(Austria) Linde Linz	23-22 at home, 19-24 at away
1994/95	Szeged	Quarter-finals	48–48 (a)	(Russia) Polyot Cheljabinsk	27-25 at home, 21-23 at away
1995/96	Elektromos	Quarter-finals	41–43	(Spain) Granollers	21-17 at home, 20-26 at away
1996/97	Elektromos	Round of 32	47–47 (a)	(Slovenia) Gorenje Velenje	25-25 at home, 22-22 at away
1997/98	Dunaferr	Round of 16	45–49	(Germany) THW Kiel	24-23 at home, 21-26 at away
1998/99	Dunaferr	Round of 32	39–47	(Switzerland) TV Suhr	23-20 at home, 16-27 at away
1999/00	Szeged	Round of 16	56–56 (a)	(Norway) Viking	31-29 at home, 25-27 at away
2000/01	Szeged	Quarter-finals	51–53	(Spain) Bidasoa Irun	28-27 at home, 23-26 at away
2000/01	Kiskőrös	Third round	38–56	(Russia) CSKA Moscow	18-30 at home, 20-26 at away
2001/02	Szeged	Third round	63–64	(Spain) Gáldar	33-28 at home, 30-36 at away
2001/02	PLER	Second round	49–59	(Austria) Bregenz	27-25 at home, 22-34 at away
2002/03	Dunaferr	Semi-finals	52–53	(Russia) Dinamo Astrakhan	27-30 at home, 23-25 at away
2002/03	Orosháza	Second round	52–60	(Ukraine) Portovik Yuzhny	26-34 at home, 26-26 at away
2003/04	Dunaferr	Quarter-finals	57–68	(Russia) Dinamo Astrakhan	30-32 at home, 27-36 at away
2003/04	Győri ETO	Third round	53–54	(Belarus) Meshkov Brest	27-22 at home, 26-32 at away
2004/05	Dunaferr	Quarter-finals	56–60	(Germany) VfL Gummersbach	35-30 at home, 21-30 at away
2004/05	Tatabánya	Third round	54–63	(France) Dunkerque	31-27 at home, 23-36 at away
2005/06	Dunaferr	Third round	58–61	(Turkey) Beşiktaş	34-31 at home, 24-30 at away
2005/06	Tatabánya	Third round	61–64	(Switzerland) Wacker Thun	30-27 at home, 31-37 at away
2006/07	Dunaferr	Round of 16	56–58	(Spain) Aragón	35-25 at home, 21-33 at away
2006/07	PLER	Round of 16	58–67	(Switzerland) Grasshoppers	36-32 at home, 22-35 at away
2007/08	Dunaferr	Round of 16	53–66	(Spain) Aragón	39-30 at home, 24-36 at away
2007/08	Debreceni KSE	Third round	63–64	(Russia) SKIF Krasnodar	35-29 at home, 28-35 at away
2008/09	Komlói BSK	Third round	63–75	(Israel) Maccabi Rishon LeZion	36-35 at home, 27-40 at away
2008/09	Debreceni KSE	Round of 16	50–61	(Slovenia) Gorenje Velenje	26-26 at home, 24-35 at away
2009/10	Dunaferr	Third round	42–49	(Slovakia) Tatran Prešov	23-22 at home, 19-27 at away
2009/10	PLER	Third round	47–48	(Iceland) Haukar	21-22 at home, 26-26 at away
2010/11	Tatabánya	Round of 16	56–64	(Spain) Logroño	30-25 at home, 26-39 at away
2010/11	Dunaferr	Third round	49–73	(Portugal) Porto	27-37 at home, 22-36 at away
2011/12	Tatabánya	Third round	51–62	(Germany) Frisch Auf Göppingen	26-28 at home, 25-34 at away
2011/12	Balatonfüred	Third round	48–56	(France) Dunkerque	27-26 at home, 21-30 at away
2012/13	Tatabánya	Second qualifying round	46–59	(Norway) Elverum	23-27 at home, 23-32 at away
2012/13	Balatonfüred	Second qualifying round	52–53	(Serbia) Vojvodina	27-24 at home, 25-29 at away
2013/14	Szeged	Winners	29–28	(France) Montpellier	
2013/14	Csurgó	3rd in Group stage	N/A	(Sweden) Lugi HF, (Spain) Ademar León, (Germany) Hannover-Burgdorf	
2013/14	Tatabánya	Second qualifying round	47–51	(Sweden) Lugi HF	20-24 at home, 27-27 at away
2014/15	Balatonfüred	4th in Group stage	N/A	(Germany) Melsungen, (Sweden) Eskilstuna Guif, (Croatia) Nexe Našice	
2014/15	Tatabánya	Third qualifying round	47–54	(Russia) St. Petersburg	23-22 at home, 24-32 at away
2014/15	Orosháza	Third qualifying round	45–72	(Denmark) Skjern	25-32 at home, 20-40 at away
2015/16	Tatabánya	Third qualifying round	48–59	(Sweden) Ystads IF	20-31 at home, 28-28 at away
2015/16	Csurgó	Third qualifying round	61–65	(Germany) Magdeburg	24-23 at home, 37-42 at away
2016/17	Tatabánya	Quarter-finals	47–58	(Germany) Füchse Berlin	25-30 at home, 22-28 at away
2016/17	Balatonfüred	Second qualifying round	48–50	(Switzerland) Pfadi Winterthur	28-23 at home, 20-27 at away
2016/17	Csurgó	Third qualifying round	51–53	(Spain) Anaitasuna	30-26 at home, 21-27 at away
2017/18	Tatabánya	Third qualifying round	46–47	(France) Chambéry	25-24 at home, 21-23 at away
2017/18	Budakalász	Third qualifying round	48–61	(Spain) Anaitasuna	27-35 at home, 21-26 at away
2017/18	Csurgó	Second qualifying round	59–60	(Croatia) Dubrava	33-24 at home, 26-36 at away
2017/18	Balatonfüred	Third qualifying round	46–55	(Spain) Granollers	25-27 at home, 21-28 at away
2018/19	Tatabánya	Quarter-final	50–52	(Denmark) TTH Holstebro	26-23 at home, 24-29 at away
2018/19	Balatonfüred	4th in Group Stage	N/A	(Germany) Füchse Berlin, (France) Saint-Raphaël Var Handball, (Spain) Logroño La Rioja	
2018/19	Komlói BSK	Second qualifying round	56–56 (a)	(Greece) Olympiacos	34-29 at home, 22-27 at away
2019/20	Tatabánya	Group Stage	N/A	(Germany) Füchse Berlin, (France) PAUC Handball, (Spain) Logroño La Rioja	
2019/20	Balatonfüred	Third qualifying round	51–56	(Spain) León	30–27 at home, 21–29 at away
2019/20	Csurgó	Third qualifying round	48–54	(France) Nîmes	28–25 at home, 20–29 at away
2020/21	Tatabánya	Group Stage	N/A	(Germany) Rhein Neckar Löwen, (Switzerland) Kadetten Schaffhausen, (Denmark) GOG Håndbold, (North Macedonia) RK Eurofarm Pelister, (Slovenia) RK Trimo Trebnje	
2020/21	Balatonfüredi KSE	Second qualifying round	22–23	(Slovenia) RK Trimo Trebnje	22–23 at away, home match got cancelled due to positive COVID-19 tests.
2020/21	Gyöngyösi KK	Second qualifying round	47–61	(Germany) Füchse Berlin	23–25 at home, 24–36 at away
2021/22	Tatabánya	Group Stage	N/A	(France) USAM Nîmes Gard, (North Macedonia) RK Eurofarm Pelister, (Switzerland) Kadetten Schaffhausen, (Portugal) Sporting CP, (Greece) AEK Athens HC	
2021/22	Balatonfüredi KSE	First qualifying round	47–47	(Sweden) HK Malmö	27–25 at home, 20–22 at away
2021/22	Csurgói KK	First qualifying round	51–58	(Romania) Constanța	23–27 at home, 28–31 at away
2022/23	Balatonfüredi KSE	Group stage	N/A	(Croatia) RK Nexe Našice, (Portugal) Sporting CP, (Spain) BM Granollers, (Denmark) Skjern Håndbold, (Austria) Alpla HC Hard	
2022/23	Ferencvárosi TC	Last 16	59–79	(France) Montpellier Handball	30-36 at home, 29-43 at away
2022/23	Veszprém Felsőörs	Group stage	N/A	(France) Montpellier Handball, (Germany) Frisch Auf Göppingen, (Switzerland) Kadetten Schaffhausen, (Portugal) S.L. Benfica, (Slovakia) HT Tatran Prešov	
2023/24	Tatabánya	Group stage	N/A	(Romania) CSM Constanța, (Portugal) Sporting CP, (Poland) SPR Chrobry Głogów	
2024/25	Tatabánya	Main round	N/A	(Germany) SG Flensburg-Handewitt, (France) Fenix Toulouse Handball, (Germany) VfL Gummersbach	
2024/25	Ferencvárosi TC	Qualification round	61–77	(Denmark) Bjerringbro-Silkeborg	34-32 at home, 27-45 at away

==== EHF/IHF Cup Winners' Cup ====
While the IHF Cup Winners' Cup (1976–1993) is recognised as the predecessor to the EHF Cup Winners' Cup, it was not organised by EHF. The final tournament was held in 2011–12, after which it was absorbed into the EHF Cup.

Year	Team	Progress	Aggregate	Opponents	Results
1976/77	Elektromos	Round of 16	48–56	(East Germany) Magdeburg	28-28 at home, 20-28 at away
1977/78	Szeged	Quarter-finals	46–47	(Poland) Anilana Łódź	26-22 at home, 20-25 at away
1978/79	Szeged	Semi-finals	31–39	(West Germany) VfL Gummersbach	21-21 at home, 10-18 at away
1979/80	Debreceni Dózsa	Quarter-finals	43–54	(Spain) Alicante	24-22 at home, 19-32 at away
1980/81	Elektromos	Quarter-finals	38–46	(Socialist Federal Republic of Yugoslavia) Metaloplastika	16-20 at home, 22-26 at away
1981/82	Elektromos	Quarter-finals	50–55	(West Germany) VfL Günzburg	29-27 at home, 21-28 at away
1982/83	Szeged	Semi-finals	44–61	(Soviet Union) SKA Minsk	25-24 at home, 19-37 at away
1983/84	Szeged	Semi-finals	50–51	(Socialist Federal Republic of Yugoslavia) Sloga Doboj	24-26 at home, 26-25 at away
1984/85	Veszprém	Round of 16	38–44	(East Germany) Dynamo Berlin	18-23 at home, 20-21 at away
1985/86	Veszprém	Semi-finals	46–54	(Spain) Barcelona	27-25 at home, 19-29 at away
1986/87	Győri ETO	Quarter-finals	38–38 (a)	(West Germany) MTSV Schwabing	23-17 at home, 15-21 at away
1987/88	Győri ETO	Round of 16	37–39	(Spain) Atlético Madrid	24-15 at home, 13-24 at away
1988/89	Veszprém	Quarter-finals	38–43	(West Germany) TuSEM Essen	23-20 at home, 15-23 at away
1989/90	Veszprém	Semi-finals	45–54	(Spain) Santander	24-29 at home, 21-25 at away
1990/91	Veszprém	Semi-finals	35–38	(Germany) TSV Milbertshofen	20-15 at home, 15-23 at away
1991/92	Veszprém	Winners	51–34	(Germany) TSV Milbertshofen	24-14 at home, 27-20 at away
1992/93	Veszprém	Finals	43–46	(France) Vitrolles	22-23 at home, 21-23 at away
1992/93	Győri ETO	First round	44–44 (a)	(Romania) Minaur Baia Mare	25-20 at home, 19-24 at away
1993/94	Szeged	Semi-finals	36–43	(Spain) Barcelona	22-24 at home, 14-19 at away
1994/95	Elektromos	Quarter-finals	45–53	(Spain) Barcelona	20-19 at home, 25-34 at away
1995/96	Győri ETO	Round of 32	55–61	(Serbia and Montenegro) Crvena zvezda	30-27 at home, 25-34 at away
1996/97	Veszprém	Finals	38–41	(Spain) Bidasoa Irun	19-17 at home, 19-24 at away
1997/98	Elektromos	Quarter-finals	38–40	(Germany) Dutenhofen/Münchholzhausen	22-18 at home, 16-22 at away
1998/99	Elektromos	Round of 32	40–46	(Serbia and Montenegro) Partizan	20-21 at home, 20-25 at away
1999/00	Dunaferr	Finals	45–48	(Spain) San Antonio	26-20 at home, 19-28 at away
2000/01	Veszprém	Quarter-finals	42–53	(Germany) Flensburg-Handewitt	20-22 at home, 22-31 at away
2001/02	Dunaferr	Semi-finals	42–47	(Germany) Flensburg-Handewitt	21-22 at home, 21-25 at away
2002/03	Szeged	Quarter-finals	62–74	(Germany) TBV Lemgo	30-34 at home, 32-40 at away
2003/04	Csömör	Second round	38–43	(Ukraine) Portovik Yuzhny	18-19 at home, 20-24 at away
2004/05	Nyíregyháza	Second round	58–61	(Croatia) Medveščak	32-27 at home, 26-34 at away
2005/06	PLER	Second round	58–58 (a)	(Norway) Haslum	29-31 at home, 29-27 at away
2006/07	Komlói BSK	Second round	47–58	(Denmark) Bjerringbro-Silkeborg	23-23 at home, 24-35 at away
2007/08	Veszprém	Winners (from CL)	65–60	(Germany) Rhein-Neckar Löwen	37-32 at home, 28-28 at away
2007/08	PLER	Third round	50–56	(Turkey) Milli Piyango	26-31 at home, 24-25 at away
2008/09	Szeged	Quarter-finals (from CL)	56–60	(Germany) HSG Nordhorn	31-26 at home, 25-34 at away
2008/09	Dunaferr	Round of 16	52–57	(Hungary) Szeged	33-29 at home, 19-28 at away
2008/09	PLER	Third round	56–61	(Hungary) Dunaferr	30-32 at home, 26-29 at away
2009/10	Ferencváros	Third round	51–62	(Slovenia) Cimos Koper	29-34 at home, 22-28 at away
2010/11	Balatonfüred	Round of 16	47–49	Tremblay-en-France	20-20 at home, 27-29 at away
2011/12	FTC-PLER	Round of 16	51–64	(Germany) Flensburg-Handewitt	26-32 at home, 25-32 at away

==== EHF City Cup ====
Although the tournament was founded in 1993–94, it was only taken over by EHF in 2000. After that, the name was switched to EHF Challenge Cup

Year	Team	Progress	Aggregate	Opponents	Results
1993/94	Győri ETO	Round of 16	38–43	(Portugal) Benfica	21-24 at home, 17-19 at away
1994/95	Komlói BSK	Round of 32	32–35	(Portugal) ABC Braga	14-21 at home, 18-14 at away
1995/96	Szeged	Semi-finals	48–53	(Germany) VfL Hameln	26-27 at home, 22-26 at away
1996/97	Győri ETO	Round of 32	42–42 (a)	(Norway) Drammen	27-25 at home, 15-17 at away
1997/98	Szeged	Quarter-finals	48–54	(Germany) TuS Nettelstedt	22-25 at home, 26-29 at away
1998/99	Szeged	Quarter-finals	54–56	(Germany) TuS Nettelstedt	25-28 at home, 29-28 at away
1999/00	Nyíregyháza	Round of 32	48–57	(Turkey) ASKI Ankara	25-25 at home, 23-32 at away

=== Women's record ===
==== Women's EHF Champions League/European Cup ====
The competition was named European Cup until 1992/93, until it switched its name to EHF Champions League.

Year	Team	Progress	Aggregate	Opponents	Results
1962/63	Bp. Spartacus	First round	8–20	(Romania) Rapid București	2-4 at home, 6-16 at away
1963/64	Bp. Spartacus	Semi-finals	12–22	(Romania) Rapid București	7-11 at home, 5-13 at away
1964/65	Bp. Spartacus	Finals	16–21	(Denmark) HG København	10-7 at home, 6-14 at away
1965/66	Bp. Spartacus	Semi-finals	9–13	(East Germany) Leipzig	5-3 at home, 4-10 at away
1966/67	Bp. Spartacus	Quarter-finals	16–18	(Soviet Union) Žalgiris Kaunas	8-7 at home, 8-11 at away
1967/68	Ferencváros	First round	11–14	(East Germany) Empor Rostock	7-4 at home, 5-10 at away
1969/70	Ferencváros	First round	18–26	(East Germany) Leipzig	8-7 at home, 10-19 at away
1970/71	Ferencváros	Final	9–11	(Soviet Union) Spartak Kyiv	
1971/72	Veszprém	Semi-finals	15–23	(Soviet Union) Spartak Kyiv	10-9 at home, 5-14 at away
1972/73	Ferencváros	First round	15–20	(East Germany) Leipzig	8-9 at home, 7-11 at away
1973/74	Vasas	Quarter-finals	23–24	(Socialist Federal Republic of Yugoslavia) Radnički Belgrade	15-12 at home, 8-12 at away
1974/75	Vasas	Semi-finals	25–27	(Socialist Federal Republic of Yugoslavia) Lokomotiva Zagreb	14-11 at home, 11-16 at away
1976/77	Vasas	Quarter-finals	21–23	(Soviet Union) Spartak Kyiv	13-10 at home, 8-13 at away
1977/78	Vasas	Final	14–19	(East Germany) TSC Berlin	
1978/79	Vasas	Finals	26–27	(Soviet Union) Spartak Kyiv	17-13 at home, 9-14 at away
1980/81	Vasas	First round	28–30	(Soviet Union) Spartak Kyiv	14-11 at home, 14-19 at away
1981/82	Vasas	Winners	50–43	(Socialist Federal Republic of Yugoslavia) Radnički Belgrade	29-19 at home, 21-24 at away
1982/83	Vasas	Semi-finals	48–54	(Socialist Federal Republic of Yugoslavia) Radnički Belgrade	26-22 at home, 22-32 at away
1982/83	Bp. Spartacus	Quarter-finals	32–35	(Hungary) Vasas	16-21 at home, 16-14 at away
1983/84	Vasas	Semi-finals	29–32	(West Germany) Bayer Leverkusen	17-17 at home, 12-15 at away
1984/85	Bp. Spartacus	Round of 16	53–56	(Romania) Știința Bacău	31-27 at home, 22-29 at away
1985/86	Vasas	Semi-finals	37–43	(Soviet Union) Spartak Kyiv	18-15 at home, 19-28 at away
1986/87	Vasas	Round of 16	40–49	(Socialist Federal Republic of Yugoslavia) Radnički Belgrade	27-22 at home, 13-27 at away
1987/88	Bp. Spartacus	Semi-finals	50–63	(Soviet Union) Spartak Kyiv	25-27 at home, 25-36 at away
1988/89	Debreceni VSC	Semi-finals	39–49	(Austria) Hypo Niederösterreich	24-29 at home, 15-20 at away
1989/90	Építők	Round of 16	36–37	(Poland) AZS Wrocław	17-17 at home, 19-20 at away
1990/91	Építők	Semi-finals	38–48	(Austria) Hypo Niederösterreich	22-24 at home, 16-24 at away
1991/92	Hargita	Semi-finals	40–41	(Germany) Lützellinden	21-15 at home, 19-26 at away
1992/93	Vasas	Finals	25–40	(Austria) Hypo Niederösterreich	14-17 at home, 11-23 at away
1993/94	Vasas	Finals	39–45	(Austria) Hypo Niederösterreich	18-20 at home, 21-25 at away
1994/95	Ferencváros	3rd in Group stage	N/A	(Germany) Walle Bremen, (Croatia) Podravka Koprivnica, (Netherlands) Swift Roermond	
1995/96	Ferencváros	2nd in Group stage	N/A	(Austria) Hypo Niederösterreich, (Denmark) Viborg, (Romania) Oltchim Rm. Vâlcea	
1996/97	Ferencváros	Semi-finals	43–50	(Denmark) Viborg	19-23 at home, 24-27 at away
1997/98	Ferencváros	3rd in Group stage	N/A	(Spain) Milar Valencia, (Slovenia) Krim, (France) Metz	
1998/99	Dunaferr	Winners	51–49	(Slovenia) Krim	25-23 at home, 26-26 at away
1999/00	Dunaferr	Quarter-finals	53–55	(Serbia and Montenegro) Budućnost	33-33 at home, 26-30 at away
1999/00	Ferencváros	Quarter-finals	48–52	(Austria) Hypo Niederösterreich	27-23 at home, 21-29 at away
2000/01	Ferencváros	Semi-finals	42–46	(Denmark) Viborg	21-22 at home, 21-24 at away
2000/01	Győri ETO	4th in Group stage	N/A	(Slovenia) Krim, (Spain) Milar Valencia, (Ukraine) Spartak Kyiv	
2001/02	Dunaferr	3rd in Group stage	N/A	(Serbia and Montenegro) Budućnost, (Spain) Milar Valencia, (Denmark) GOG Gudme	
2001/02	Ferencváros	Finals	49–51	(North Macedonia) Kometal Gjorče Petrov	27-25 at home, 22-26 at away
2002/03	Ferencváros	Quarter-finals	60–67	(Spain) Milar Valencia	34-32 at home, 26-35 at away
2002/03	Dunaferr	Second qual. round (to EHF)	51–52	(Spain) Ferrobús Mislata	31-25 at home, 20-27 at away
2003/04	Dunaferr	Semi-finals	56–61	(Denmark) Slagelse	34-29 at home, 22-32 at away
2003/04	Ferencváros	Quarter-finals	55–60	(Denmark) Slagelse	30-28 at home, 25-32 at away
2004/05	Dunaferr	Semi-finals	42–49	(Denmark) Slagelse	25-28 at home, 17-21 at away
2004/05	Győri ETO	Second qual. round (to EHF)	57–58	(Ukraine) Motor Zaporizhzhia	29-27 at home, 28-31 at away
2005/06	Győri ETO	3rd in Group stage (to CWC)	N/A	(North Macedonia) Kometal Gjorče Petrov, (Denmark) Aalborg, (Russia) Dinamo Volgograd	
2005/06	Dunaferr	3rd in Group stage (to CWC)	N/A	(Denmark) Slagelse, (Russia) Lada Togliatti, (Serbia and Montenegro) Knjaz Miloš	
2006/07	Győri ETO	Semi-finals	47–61	(Denmark) Slagelse	22-30 at home, 25-31 at away
2006/07	Ferencváros	3rd in Group stage (to CWC)	N/A	(Austria) Hypo Niederösterreich, (Denmark) Slagelse, (North Macedonia) Kometal Gjorče Petrov	
2007/08	Ferencváros	4th in Group stage	N/A	(Romania) Oltchim Rm. Vâlcea, (Denmark) Viborg, (Serbia and Montenegro) Budućnost	
2007/08	Győri ETO	Semi-finals	46–50	(Russia) Zvezda Zvenigorod	21-27 at home, 25-23 at away
2008/09	Győri ETO	Finals	49–50	(Denmark) Viborg	23-26 at home, 24-26 at away
2008/09	Dunaferr	Second qual. tournament (to EHF)	N/A	(Denmark) FC København, (Ukraine) Motor Zaporizhzhia, (Serbia) Naisa Niš	
2009/10	Győri ETO	Semi-finals	45–49	(Romania) Oltchim Rm. Vâlcea	25-25 at home, 20-24 at away
2009/10	Ferencváros	Second qual. tournament (to EHF)	N/A	(Denmark) FC København, (Ukraine) Smart, (Switzerland) LC Brühl	
2010/11	Győri ETO	Semi-finals	45–50	(Spain) Itxako-Navarra	24-24 at home, 21-26 at away
2010/11	Debreceni VSC	4th in Group stage	N/A	(Spain) Itxako-Navarra, (Germany) Leipzig, (Austria) Hypo Niederösterreich	
2011/12	Győri ETO	Finals	54–54 (a)	(Montenegro) Budućnost	29-27 at home, 25-27 at away
2011/12	Debreceni VSC	Second qual. tournament (to CWC)	N/A	(Germany) Buxtehude, (Poland) Zagłębie Lubin, (Portugal) Gil Eanes	
2012/13	Győri ETO	Winners	47–43	(Norway) Larvik	23-22 at home, 24-21 at away
2012/13	Ferencváros	3rd in Main round	N/A	(Slovenia) Krim, (Romania) Oltchim Rm. Vâlcea, (Russia) Zvezda Zvenigorod	
2013/14	Győri ETO	Winners	27–21	(Montenegro) Budućnost	
2013/14	Ferencváros	3rd in Group stage (to CWC)	N/A	(Denmark) Midtjylland, (Montenegro) Budućnost, (Poland) Lublin	
2013/14	Érd	Second qual. tournament (to CWC)	N/A	(Hungary) Ferencváros, (Croatia) Lokomotiva Zagreb, (Switzerland) LK Zug	
2014/15	Győri ETO	Quarter-finals	45–51	(North Macedonia) Vardar	27-27 at home, 18-24 at away
2014/15	Ferencváros	Qualification tournament (to CWC)	N/A	(Germany) Leipzig, (Netherlands) Dalfsen, (Belarus) BNTU Minsk	
2015/16	Ferencváros	Quarter-finals	41–71	(Hungary) Győri ETO	27-27 at home, 18-24 at away
2015/16	Győri ETO	Final	25–25 (1-4 p)	(Romania) CSM București	
2016/17	Győri ETO	Winners	31–30 (OT)	(North Macedonia) Vardar	
2016/17	Ferencváros	Quarter-finals	51–57	(Romania) CSM București	26-27 at home, 25-30 at away
2017/18	Győri ETO	Winners	27–26 (OT)	(North Macedonia) Vardar	
2017/18	Ferencváros	Quarter-finals	51–63	(Russia) Rostov-Don	29-31 at home, 22-32 at away
2018/19	Győri ETO	Winners	25–24	(Russia) Rostov-Don	
2018/19	Ferencváros	Quarter-finals	48–62	(Russia) Rostov-Don	26-29 at home, 22-33 at away
2019/20	Győri ETO	Cancelled due to COVID-19			
2019/20	Ferencváros	6th in Main round	N/A	(Russia) Rostov-Don, (Romania) CSM Bucureşti, (Norway) Vipers Kristiansand	
2020/21	Győri ETO	Bronze medallist	32–21	(Russia) CSKA Moscow	
2020/21	Ferencváros	Quarter-finals	48–50	(Montenegro) ŽRK Budućnost	29-28 at home, 19-22 at away
2021/22	Ferencváros	Play-offs	52–55	(Slovenia) RK Krim	26–22 at home, 26–33 at away
2021/22	Győri ETO	Final	31–33	(Norway) Vipers Kristiansand	
2022/23	Győri ETO	Bronze medallist	28–27	(Denmark) Team Esbjerg	
2022/23	Ferencváros	Final	24–28	(Norway) Vipers Kristiansand	
2023/24	Győri ETO	Winners	30–24	(Germany) SG BBM Bietigheim	
2023/24	Ferencváros	Quarter-finals	49–55	(Denmark) Team Esbjerg	25–26 at home, 24–29 at away
2023/24	Debrecen	Play-offs	55–56	(Norway) Vipers Kristiansand	28-29 at home, 27-27 at away
2024/25	Ferencváros	Quarter-finals	51–52	(Denmark) Odense Håndbold	24-25 at home, 27-27 at away
2024/25	Győri ETO	Winners	29–27	(Denmark) Odense Håndbold	

==== EHF Women's European Handball League/Women's EHF/IHF Cup ====
While the IHF Cup (1981–1993) is recognised as the predecessor to the EHF Cup, it was not organised by EHF.

Year	Team	Progress	Aggregate	Opponents	Results
1981/82	Veszprém	Quarter-finals	40–44	(Socialist Federal Republic of Yugoslavia) Trešnjevka	22-19 at home, 18-25 at away
1982/83	Veszprém	Semi-finals	34–42	(East Germany) Empor Rostock	19-19 at home, 15-23 at away
1983/84	Békéscsabai Előre	Semi-finals	42–51	(Romania) Oltchim Râmnicu Vâlcea	21-23 at home, 21-28 at away
1984/85	Vasas	Finals	32–36	(East Germany) Vorwärts Frankfurt	19-17 at home, 13-19 at away
1985/86	Debreceni VSC	Finals	37–41	(East Germany) Leipzig	22-16 at home, 15-25 at away
1986/87	Bp. Spartacus	Semi-finals	49–50	(Czechoslovakia) Štart Bratislava	31-23 at home, 18-27 at away
1987/88	Debreceni VSC	Round of 16	50–51	(Socialist Federal Republic of Yugoslavia) Belinka Ljubljana	28-25 at home, 22-26 at away
1988/89	Bp. Spartacus	Semi-finals	54–60	(Romania) Oltchim Râmnicu Vâlcea	29-26 at home, 25-34 at away
1989/90	Bp. Spartacus	Semi-finals	30–49	(East Germany) Vorwärts Frankfurt	21-23 at home, 9-26 at away
1990/91	Szeged	Round of 16	43–49	(Socialist Federal Republic of Yugoslavia) Lokomotiva Zagreb	23-24 at home, 20-25 at away
1991/92	BHG	Round of 16	40–44	(Norway) Lunner	23-19 at home, 17-25 at away
1992/93	Debreceni VSC	Round of 16	47–50	(France) CSL Dijon	29-21 at home, 18-29 at away
1993/94	Debreceni VSC	Finals	44–44 (a)	(Denmark) Viborg	24-21 at home, 20-23 at away
1994/95	Debreceni VSC	Winners	44–44 (a)	(Norway) Bækkelagets	22-14 at home, 22-30 at away
1995/96	Debreceni VSC	Winners	38–38 (a)	(Norway) Larvik	18-15 at home, 20-23 at away
1995/96	Kisvárda	Quarter-finals	35–52	(Spain) Valencia Urbana	22-22 at home, 13-30 at away
1996/97	Debreceni VSC	Quarter-finals	34–35	(Romania) Oțelul Galați	17-14 at home, 17-21 at away
1996/97	Vasas	Semi-finals	41–47	(Slovenia) Olimpija	24-26 at home, 17-21 at away
1997/98	Dunaferr	Winners	60–49	(Slovakia) Banská Bystrica	34-27 at home, 26-22 at away
1998/99	Győri ETO	Finals	45–49	(Denmark) Viborg	24-21 at home, 21-28 at away
1998/99	Debreceni VSC	Round of 16	37–50	(Denmark) Viborg	25-20 at home, 12-30 at away
1999/00	Debreceni VSC	Quarter-finals	39–56	(Spain) Ferrobús Mislata	19-33 at home, 20-23 at away
2000/01	Debreceni VSC	Fourth round	41–42	(Poland) Zagłębie Lubin	28-25 at home, 13-17 at away
2000/01	Fehérvár	Fourth round	50–58	(Slovakia) Slovan Duslo Šaľa	27-27 at home, 23-31 at away
2001/02	Győri ETO	Finals	53–61	(Denmark) Ikast	30-25 at home, 23-36 at away
2001/02	Fehérvár	Third round	49–69	(Denmark) Ikast	26-29 at home, 20-43 at away
2002/03	Dunaferr	Finals (from CL)	47–49	(Denmark) Slagelse	27-22 at home, 20-27 at away
2002/03	Fehérvár	Semi-finals	51–55	(Hungary) Dunaferr	23-22 at home, 28-33 at away
2002/03	Debreceni VSC	Fourth round	52–80	(Denmark) Slagelse	23-28 at home, 29-42 at away
2003/04	Győri ETO	Finals	48–64	(Denmark) Viborg	27-27 at home, 21-37 at away
2003/04	Fehérvár	Second round	53–54	(Austria) Wiener Neustadt	31-26 at home, 22-28 at away
2004/05	Győri ETO	Finals (from CL)	46–49	(Hungary) Fehérvár	27-21 at home, 19-28 at away
2004/05	Ferencváros	Semi-finals	60–61	(Hungary) Fehérvár	29-36 at home, 31-30 at away
2004/05	Fehérvár	Winners	49–46	(Hungary) Győri ETO	28-19 at home, 21-27 at away
2005/06	Ferencváros	Winners	70–68	(Croatia) Podravka Koprivnica	37-36 at home, 32-33 at away
2005/06	Fehérvár	Quarter-finals	54–56	(Croatia) Podravka Koprivnica	26-28 at home, 24-26 at away
2005/06	Debreceni VSC	Semi-finals	45–55	(Croatia) Podravka Koprivnica	24-29 at home, 21-26 at away
2006/07	Dunaferr	Quarter-finals	56–58	(Spain) Elda Prestigio	28-24 at home, 28-34 at away
2006/07	Debreceni VSC	Quarter-finals	51–52	(Denmark) Ikast	27-26 at home, 24-26 at away
2006/07	Kiskunhalas	Round of 16	47–59	(Hungary) Dunaferr	27-28 at home, 20-31 at away
2007/08	Dunaferr	Semi-finals	49–51	(Spain) Itxako-Navarra	27-23 at home, 22-28 at away
2007/08	Fehérvár	Round of 16	47–53	(Spain) Itxako-Navarra	26-26 at home, 21-27 at away
2008/09	Dunaferr	Third round (from CL)	58–60	(Germany) VfL Oldenburg	31-31 at home, 27-29 at away
2008/09	Ferencváros	Round of 16	29–35	(Russia) Dinamo Volgograd	0-0 at home, 29-35 at away
2008/09	Fehérvár	Round of 16	60–69	(Romania) Corona Brașov	33-33 at home, 27-36 at away
2009/10	Ferencváros	Third round (from CL)	52–63	(Denmark) Randers	25-30 at home, 27-33 at away
2009/10	Békéscsabai Előre	Third round	54–56	(Spain) Sagunto	30-30 at home, 24-26 at away
2009/10	Fehérvár	Third round	52–63	(Poland) Lublin	27-24 at home, 20-28 at away
2010/11	Vác	Quarter-finals	60–65	(Denmark) Holstebro	28-29 at home, 32-36 at away
2010/11	Békéscsabai Előre	Third round	54–54 (a)	(Slovenia) Olimpija	32-23 at home, 22-31 at away
2011/12	Vác	Round of 16	52–55	(Turkey) Milli Piyango	24-20 at home, 28-35 at away
2011/12	Békéscsabai Előre	Round of 16	44–47	(Spain) Mar Alicante	19-25 at home, 25-22 at away
2012/13	Siófok	Third round	59–63	(Russia) Astrakhanochka	31-22 at home, 28-41 at away
2012/13	Érd	Third round	63–63 (a)	(France) Metz	37-31 at home, 26-32 at away
2013/14	Vác	Round of 16	44–46	(Hungary) Fehérvár	25-24 at home, 19-22 at away
2013/14	Fehérvár	Semi-finals	51–51 (a)	(Denmark) Esbjerg	26-27 at home, 24-25 at away
2014/15	Érd	Semi-finals	52–60	(Russia) Rostov-Don	24-28 at home, 28-32 at away
2014/15	Dunaújvárosi Kohász	Round of 16	47–57	(Russia) Rostov-Don	28-29 at home, 19-28 at away
2015/16	Dunaújvárosi Kohász	Winners	55–49	(Germany) TuS Metzingen	29-21 at home, 26-28 at away
2015/16	Siófok	Round of 16	47–47 (a)	(Hungary) Dunaújvárosi Kohász	24-19 at home, 23-28 at away
2016/17	Dunaújvárosi Kohász	Third qualifying round	47–60	(Hungary) Érd	25-31 at home, 22-29 at away
2016/17	Érd	3rd in Group stage	N/A	(Russia) Rostov-Don, (Germany) Bietigheim, (Norway) Byåsen	
2016/17	Debreceni VSC	Second qualifying round	49–52	(France) Nantes	26-28 at home, 23-24 at away
2016/17	Fehérvár	3rd in Group stage	N/A	(Russia) Kuban Krasnodar, (France) Brest, (Germany) Leipzig	
2017/18	Érd	Third qualifying round	51–52	(France) Issy-Paris	31-21 at home, 20-31 at away
2017/18	Dunaújvárosi Kohász	Third qualifying round	41–45	(Denmark) København	20-23 at home, 21-22 at away
2017/18	Debreceni VSC	Third qualifying round	45–48	(Romania) SCM Craiova	26-24 at home, 19-24 at away
2017/18	Vác	Third qualifying round	53–62	(Turkey) Kastamonu Bld.	24-26 at home, 29-36 at away
2018/19	Érd	Third qualifying round	56–60	(Norway) Storhamar	29-28 at home, 27-32 at away
2018/19	Dunaújvárosi Kohász	Third qualifying round	41–48	(Spain) Bera Bera	18-26 at home, 23-22 at away
2018/19	Siófok	Winners	47–42	(Denmark) Esbjerg	26-21 at home, 21-21 at away
2018/19	Vác	Second qualifying round	48–67	(Hungary) Siófok	22-35 at home, 26-32 at away
2019/20	Siófok	Semi-finals	–	(Denmark) Odense	Cancelled
2019/20	Érd	3rd in group stage	N/A	(Denmark) Odense, (Romania) Bistrita, (Poland) Lublin	
2019/20	Vác	Third qualifying round	56–58	(Turkey) Kastamonu Bld.	30–25 at home, 26–33 at away
2019/20	Debreceni VSC	3rd in group stage	N/A	(Germany) Thüringer, (Turkey) Kastamonu Bld., (Czech Republic) Most	
2020/21	Siófok	Final	31–36	(France) Nantes	
2020/21	Váci NKSE	Group stage	N/A	(Denmark) Ikast Håndbold, (Russia) HC Zvezda, (France) Paris 92	
2020/21	Debreceni VSC	Third qualifying round	30–31	(Turkey) Kastamonu Bld.	
2020/21	Alba Fehérvár KC	Third qualifying round	(walkover)	(Norway) Storhamar HE	
2021/22	Mosonmagyaróvár	Group stage	N/A	(Norway) Sola HK, (France) ESBF Besançon, (Croatia) RK Lokomotiva Zagreb	
2021/22	Váci NKSE	Group stage	N/A	(Denmark) Viborg HK, (Romania) SCM Râmnicu Vâlcea, (France) Chambray Touraine	
2021/22	Debreceni VSC	Third qualifying round	43–47	(Romania) Măgura Cisnădie	22–22 at home, 21–25 at away
2021/22	MTK Budapest	Third qualifying round	56–68	(Denmark) Herning-Ikast Håndbold	27–34 at home, 29–34 at away
2022/23	Debreceni VSC	Group stage	N/A	(Denmark) Nykøbing Falster, (Norway) Sola HK, (Croatia) Podravka Vegeta	
2022/23	Mosonmagyaróvár	Group stage	N/A	(Denmark) Ikast Håndbold, (France) Neptunes de Nantes, (Norway) Fana	
2022/23	Váci NKSE	Group stage	N/A	(Germany) Thüringer HC, (Romania) SCM Râmnicu Vâlcea, (France) Paris 92	
2022/23	Siófok KC	Quarter-finals	41–61	(Denmark) Ikast Håndbold	20–30 at home, 21–31 at away
2023/24	Mosonmagyaróvár	Quarter-finals	55–59	(Romania) CS Gloria Bistrița-Năsăud	30–32 at home, 25–27 at away
2023/24	Váci NKSE	Group stage	N/A	(Norway) Storhamar HE, (Croatia) Podravka Vegeta, (Denmark) Nykøbing Falster	
2024/25	Mosonmagyaróvár	Group stage	N/A	(Germany) HSG Blomberg-Lippe, (France) Jeanne d'Arc Dijon Handball, (Poland) Zagłębie Lubin	
2024/25	Debreceni VSC	Third Qualifying Round	59–64	(Romania) SCM Râmnicu Vâlcea	28–31 at home, 31–33 at away
2024/25	Váci NKSE	Third Qualifying Round	51–68	(Germany) Thüringer HC	29–34 at home, 22–34 at away

==== Women's EHF/IHF Cup Winners' Cup ====
While the IHF Cup Winners' Cup (1976–1993) is recognised as the predecessor to the EHF Cup Winners' Cup, it was not organised by EHF. The final tournament was held in 2015–16, after which it was absorbed into the EHF Cup.

Year	Team	Progress	Aggregate	Opponents	Results
1976/77	Csepel	Semi-finals	25–45	(East Germany) TSC Berlin	14-19 at home, 11-26 at away
1978	Ferencváros	Winners	18–17	(East Germany) Leipzig	
1979	Ferencváros	Finals	30–40	(East Germany) TSC Berlin	15-20 at home, 15-20 at away
1980/81	Bp. Spartacus	Winners	40–34	(Socialist Federal Republic of Yugoslavia) Sombor	22-17 at home, 18-17 at away
1981/82	Bp. Spartacus	Finals	38–44	(Socialist Federal Republic of Yugoslavia) Osijek	21-27 at home, 17-27 at away
1981/82	Építők	Quarter-finals	40–44	(East Germany) Vorwärts Frankfurt	23-22 at home, 17-22 at away
1982/83	Építők	Quarter-finals	36–42	(Soviet Union) Rostselmash	16-20 at home, 16-22 at away
1983/84	Építők	Semi-finals	39–49	(Socialist Federal Republic of Yugoslavia) Dalma Split	20-22 at home, 19-27 at away
1984/85	Veszprém	Round of 16	42–43	(Bulgaria) CSKA Sofia	26-16 at home, 16-27 at away
1985/86	Bp. Spartacus	Round of 16	48–52	(East Germany) TSC Berlin	23-23 at home, 25-32 at away
1986/87	Debreceni VSC	Round of 16	47–52	(Soviet Union) Kuban Krasnodar	23-23 at home, 24-29 at away
1987/88	Vasas	Finals	37–48	(Soviet Union) Kuban Krasnodar	20-20 at home, 17-28 at away
1988/89	Vasas	Quarter-finals	41–63	(Romania) Știința Bacău	21-31 at home, 20-32 at away
1989/90	Debreceni VSC	Semi-finals	42–53	(Soviet Union) Rostselmash	21-23 at home, 21-30 at away
1990/91	Debreceni VSC	Semi-finals	42–53	(Socialist Federal Republic of Yugoslavia) Radnički Belgrade	21-23 at home, 21-30 at away
1991/92	Debreceni VSC	Finals	45–45 (a)	(Socialist Federal Republic of Yugoslavia) Radnički Belgrade	26-21 at home, 19-24 at away
1992/93	Építők	Round of 16	40–52	(Germany) Giessen-Lützellinden	20-29 at home, 20-23 at away
1993/94	Ferencváros	Finals	44–45	(Germany) Walle Bremen	23-21 at home, 21-24 at away
1994/95	Dunaferr	Winners	49–43	(Germany) Giessen-Lützellinden	26-18 at home, 23-25 at away
1995/96	Dunaferr	Quarter-finals	45–48	(Croatia) Kras Zagreb	26-20 at home, 19-28 at away
1995/96	Vasas	Semi-finals	36–37	(Croatia) Kras Zagreb	25-19 at home, 11-18 at away
1996/97	Dunaferr	Round of 16	42–45	(Ukraine) Motor Zaporizhzhia	20-22 at home, 22-23 at away
1997/98	Vasas	Round of 32	37–42	(Romania) Zalău	22-16 at home, 15-24 at away
1998/99	Ferencváros	Round of 16	56–57	(Norway) Larvik	33-24 at home, 23-33 at away
1999/00	Győri ETO	Round of 16	48–52	(Spain) Milar L'Eliana	27-23 at home, 21-29 at away
2001	Dunaferr	Fourth round	36–37	(France) Besançon	20-21 at home, 16-16 at away
2002	Debreceni VSC	Fourth round	50–55	(Germany) Bayer Leverkusen	25-23 at home, 25-32 at away
2003	Győri ETO	Semi-finals	45–56	(France) Besançon	27-26 at home, 18-30 at away
2003/04	Vác	Quarter-finals	41–60	(Austria) Hypo Niederösterreich	26-30 at home, 15-30 at away
2004/05	Vác	Fourth round	44–58	(Germany) Nürnberg	19-26 at home, 25-32 at away
2005/06	Győri ETO	Finals (from CL)	48–51	(Serbia and Montenegro) Budućnost	23-26 at home, 25-25 at away
2005/06	Dunaferr	Quarter-finals (from CL)	60–61	(Norway) Gjerpen	32-32 at home, 28-29 at away
2005/06	Vác	Fourth round	48–64	(Norway) Gjerpen	25-27 at home, 23-37 at away
2006/07	Ferencváros	Semi-finals (from CL)	50–64	(Romania) Râmnicu Vâlcea	27-28 at home, 23-36 at away
2006/07	Fehérvár	Third round	48–65	(Romania) Râmnicu Vâlcea	25-25 at home, 23-40 at away
2007/08	Debreceni VSC	Round of 16	58–58	(Romania) Corona Brașov	30-30 at home, 20-25 at away
2008/09	Debreceni VSC	Round of 16	58–58 (a)	(Romania) Oțelul Galați	34-29 at home, 24-29 at away
2009/10	Debreceni VSC	Fourth round	47–48	(Montenegro) Budućnost	27-20 at home, 20-28 at away
2010/11	Ferencváros	Winners	57–52	(Spain) Mar Alicante	34-29 at home, 23-23 at away
2011/12	Ferencváros	Winners	62–60	(Denmark) Viborg	31-30 at home, 31-30 at away
2011/12	Debreceni VSC	Quarter-finals (from CL)	50–81	(Denmark) Viborg	25-39 at home, 25-42 at away
2011/12	Fehérvár	Round of 16	41–44	(Serbia) Zaječar	24-20 at home, 17-24 at away
2012/13	Békéscsabai Előre	Third round	50–51	(Norway) Stabæk	22-27 at home, 28-24 at away
2012/13	Vác	Quarter-finals	47–50	(France) Issy-Paris	24-23 at home, 23-27 at away
2013/14	Ferencváros	Quarter-finals (from CL)	63–66	(Denmark) Viborg	31-26 at home, 32-40 at away
2013/14	Érd	Round of 16 (from CL)	54–54 (a)	(Germany) Buxtehude	32-23 at home, 22-31 at away
2013/14	Veszprém	Round of 16	39–54	(France) Fleury Loiret	17-21 at home, 22-33 at away
2014/15	Ferencváros	Semi-finals (from CL)	52–61	(Denmark) Midtjylland	23-30 at home, 29-31 at away
2014/15	Siófok	Round of 16	47–50	(Austria) Hypo Niederösterreich	25-20 at home, 22-30 at away
2015/16	Érd	Round of 16	46–46 (a)	(France) Issy-Paris	29-28 at home, 17-18 at away

==== Women's City Cup ====
Although the tournament was founded in 1993–94, it was only taken over by EHF in 2000. After that, the name was switched to EHF Challenge Cup

Year	Team	Progress	Aggregate	Opponents	Results
1993/94	Szeged	Semi-finals	34–56	(Germany) Buxtehude	17-24 at home, 17-32 at away
1994/95	Vasas	Finals	39–48	(Russia) Rotor Volgograd	20-24 at home, 19-24 at away
1995/96	Győri ETO	Quarter-finals	38–47	(Romania) Zalău	21-18 at home, 17-29 at away
1996/97	Győri ETO	Quarter-finals	47–49	(Germany) Frankfurter HC	29-23 at home, 18-26 at away
1997/98	Debreceni VSC	Round of 16	49–59	(Ukraine) Spartak Kyiv	25-27 at home, 24-32 at away
1998/99	Vasas	Quarter-finals	41–44	(Romania) Oțelul Galați	21-20 at home, 20-24 at away
1999/00	Fehérvár	Round of 16	42–48	(Denmark) Randers	23-20 at home, 19-28 at away
