= 2006–07 Liga ABF =

Spanish women's handball season

The Liga ABF 2006–07 was the 50th season of women's handball top flight in Spain since its establishment running from 16 September 2006 to 20 May 2007. Fourteen teams took part in the competition, including newly promoted teams CB Perdoma and AD Sagardía.

Defending champion CB Amadeo Tortajada won its second title with a two points advantage over runner-up BM Sagunto, which also qualified for the Champions League. CBF Elda, SD Itxako and BM Bera Bera followed in European positions like in the previous season, while AH Lleidatana and CB Perdoma were relegated as the two bottom teams. 6th-placed Cleba León was invited to take part in the EHF Cup but refused for financial reasons.

== Standings ==
	Team	P	W	D	L	G+	G−	Dif	Pts	2006	Comments
1	(Valencian Community) Amadeo Tortajada	26	23	1	2	742	567	175	47		Champions League
2	(Valencian Community) Sagunto	26	22	1	3	906	585	321	45		Champions League
3	(Valencian Community) Elda	26	21	1	4	773	577	196	43		EHF Cup
4	(Navarre) Itxako	26	20	2	4	670	512	158	42		EHF Cup
5	(Basque Country (autonomous community)) Bera Bera	26	15	1	10	722	668	54	31		Cup Winners' Cup
6	(Castile and León) León	26	12	3	11	711	709	2	27	2	
7	(Andalusia) Roquetas	26	13	1	12	650	643	7	27	2	
8	(Canary Islands) Remudas	26	11	3	12	631	650	–19	25	2	
9	(Valencian Community) Mar Alicante	26	11	1	14	643	703	–60	23	3	
10	(Andalusia) Goya Almería	26	7	4	15	596	633	–37	18	3	
11	(Asturias) Gijón	26	6	1	19	547	699	–152	13	1	
12	(Cantabria) Sagardía	26	6	0	20	642	800	–158	12	(P)	
13	(Catalonia) Lleidatana	26	4	1	21	558	785	–227	9	2	Relegated
14	(Canary Islands) Perdoma	26	1	0	25	535	795	–260	2	(P)	Relegated
