= 2011–12 División de Honor Femenina de Balonmano =

Spanish women's handball league season

División de Honor
- Season: 2011–12
- Champions: Asfi Itxako
- Relegated: Elda, UCAM Murcia & Gijón
- Matches: 182
- Goals: 9,208 (50.59 per match)
- Top goalscorer: Lara González, 220
- Biggest home win: Asfi Itxako 40–18 Porriño
- Biggest away win: Kukullaga 14–41 Asfi Itxako
- Highest scoring: Kukullaga 33–32 Sagunto

The División de Honor Femenina 2011–12 was the 55th season of women's handball top flight in Spain since its establishment. Season began 10 September 2011 and finished 12 May 2012. Fourteen teams took part in the competition, with BM Gijón, CB Kukullaga and CB Porriño replacing CP Goya Almería, CBF Monóvar and AD Sagardía.

SD Itxako won every match but one to lift its fourth championship in a row with a 5 points advantage over runner-up BM Bera Bera, which also qualified for the Champions League. BM Sagunto, BM Alcobendas and CB Mar Alicante followed in European positions while newly promoted Gijón and Kukullaga were relegated as the two bottom teams.

Financial strain led to major changes following the end of the season. 4-times champion CBF Elda asked to be relegated to the third tier on 18 June, Itxako renounced to its place in the Champions League three days later, and Mar Alicante also renounced to its European place on 9 July. Two days later BM Murcia became the second team relegated for financial reasons.

== Teams ==
2011–12 Liga Asobal teams
Canary Islands
- (Community of Madrid) Alcobendas
- (Basque Country (autonomous community)) Bera Bera
- (Cantabria) Castro Urdiales
- (Valencian Community) Elche
- (Valencian Community) Elda
- (Asturias) Gijón
- (Navarre) Itxako
- (Basque Country (autonomous community)) Kukullaga
- (Castile and León) León
- (Valencian Community) Mar Alicante
- (Region of Murcia) Murcia
- (Galicia (Spain)) Porriño
- (Canary Islands) Remudas
- (Valencian Community) Sagunto

== Standings ==
	Team	P	W	D	L	G+	G−	Dif	Pts
1	Asfi Itxako	26	25	0	1	850	537	313	50
2	Bera Bera	26	22	1	3	761	567	194	45
3	Sagunto	26	17	1	8	724	676	48	35
4	Alcobendas	26	15	4	7	702	633	69	34
5	Mar Alicante	26	16	0	10	682	627	55	32
6	Elche Mustang	26	15	2	9	700	661	39	32
7	Ro'Casa (Remudas)	26	11	2	3	625	655	−30	24
8	León	26	10	2	14	646	665	−19	22
9	Elda	26	9	3	14	661	692	−31	21
10	Porriño	26	8	4	14	559	673	−114	20
11	UCAM Murcia	26	8	4	14	586	633	−47	20
12	Castro Urdiales	26	6	2	18	589	636	−47	14
13	Kukullaga	26	5	1	20	584	801	−217	11
14	Gijón	26	1	2	23	539	752	−213	4

EHF Champions League
EHF Cup
EHF Winners' Cup
Relegated to División de Plata

== Statistics ==
=== Top goalscorers ===
Rank	Name	Team	Goals	GP	GPG
1	(Spain) Lara González	Elche Mustang	220	25	8.8
2	(Spain) Marta López	Helvetia Alcobendas	202	26	7.77
3	(Spain) Patricia Alonso	Sagunto	178	25	7.12
4	(Romania) Laura Gina	UCAM Murcia	144	25	5.76
5	(Ukraine) Mariya Boklashchuk	Kukullaga	139	25	5.56
6	(Spain) Alexandrina Barbosa	Asfi Itxako	139	26	5.35
7	(Spain) Patricia Elorza	Promociones Paraíso	138	26	5.31
8	(Spain) Estela Doiro	Porriño	138	22	6.27
9	(Spain) Mireya González	Helvetia Alcobendas	135	26	5.19
10	(Spain) Isabel Ortuño	Mar Alicante	133	23	5.78
