= 2010–11 Liga ABF =

Spanish women's handball league

The Liga ABF 2010–11 was the 54th season of women's handball top flight in Spain since its establishment, taking place from 11 September 2010 to 14 May 2011. Fourteen teams took part in the championship, with CBF Monóvar and CBM Murcia replacing relegated teams BM Gijón and CB Ribarroja.

SD Itxako won its third championship in a row by winning every match but one, also winning the Copa de la Reina to retain both titles. CBF Elda held its position as the runner-up, and BM Sagunto, Mar Alicante and BM Bera Bera also qualified for international competitions. On the other hand, BM Remudas and AD Sagardía were relegated. However Remudas avoided relegation in June as CP Goya Almería sold it its spot due to financial stress. One month later Monóvar was disbanded for the same reasons.

Itxako and Mar Alicante were the runners-up of the Champions League and Cup Winners' Cup respectively. In the EHF Cup Sagunto reached the quarter-finals, while 2010 runner-up Elda and CLeBa León didn't make it past the qualifying rounds.

== Table ==
| # | Team | Pld | W | D | L | GF | GA | Pt | 2010 | |
|---|---|---|---|---|---|---|---|---|---|---|
| 1 | Itxako | 26 | 25 | 0 | 1 | 869 | 563 | 50 | | QF for the 2012 Champions League |
| 2 | Elda | 26 | 19 | 1 | 6 | 756 | 689 | 39 | | QF for the 2012 Champions League's Qual. Stage |
| 3 | Sagunto | 26 | 18 | 1 | 7 | 812 | 691 | 37 | | QF for the 2012 EHF Cup |
| 4 | Mar Alicante | 26 | 16 | 2 | 8 | 713 | 635 | 34 | | QF for the 2012 Cup Winners' Cup |
| 5 | Bera Bera | 26 | 14 | 2 | 10 | 734 | 714 | 30 | 1 | QF for the 2012 EHF Cup |
| 6 | Elche | 26 | 13 | 2 | 11 | 663 | 659 | 28 | 1 | |
| 7 | León | 26 | 10 | 3 | 13 | 715 | 722 | 23 | 2 | |
| 8 | Castro Urdiales | 26 | 8 | 6 | 12 | 623 | 668 | 22 | 1 | |
| 9 | Murcia | 26 | 10 | 1 | 15 | 662 | 705 | 21 | (N) | |
| 10 | Alcobendas | 26 | 9 | 3 | 14 | 694 | 719 | 21 | | |
| 11 | Monóvar | 26 | 8 | 3 | 15 | 650 | 724 | 19 | (N) | Disbanded |
| 12 | Goya Almería | 26 | 7 | 3 | 16 | 626 | 723 | 17 | 4 | Voluntarily relegated to División de Honor Plata |
| 13 | Remudas | 26 | 6 | 3 | 17 | 621 | 717 | 15 | 2 | |
| 14 | Sagardía | 26 | 4 | 0 | 22 | 582 | 771 | 8 | 2 | Relegated to División de Honor Plata |
