= 2009–10 Liga ABF =

Spanish women's handball team

The Liga ABF 2009–10 was the 53rd season of women's handball top flight in Spain since its establishment, running from 12 September 2010 to 15 May 2010. Fourteen teams took part in the championship, with CB Castro Urdiales and CBM Murcia replacing relegated teams CB Monóvar and CB Zuazo.

Defending champion SD Itxako won its second title, while EHF Cup runner-up CBF Elda was second and BM Sagunto, Mar Alicante and CB León also qualified for EHF's competitions. BM Gijón and CB Ribarroja were relegated, with the latter (CB Amadeo Tortajada's successor) being disbanded following the end of the season.

== Teams by autonomy ==
- (Valencian Community) Mar Alicante, Elche, Elda, Ribarroja, Sagunto
- (Cantabria) Castro Urdiales, Sagardía
- (Andalusia) Goya Almería
- (Asturias) Gijón
- (Basque Country (autonomous community)) Bera Bera
- (Canary Islands) Remudas
- (Castile and León) León
- (Community of Madrid) Alcobendas
- (Navarre) Itxako

== Table ==
#	Team	Pld	W	D	L	GF	GA	Pt	2010	
1	Itxako	26	22	2	2	781	536	46		QF for the 2011 Champions League
2	Elda	26	20	3	3	779	608	43	1	QF for the 2011 Champions League's qual. stage
3	Sagunto	26	19	1	6	799	668	39	1	QF for the 2011 EHF Cup
4	Mar Alicante	26	17	2	7	765	641	36	1	QF for the 2011 Cup Winners' Cup
5	León	26	15	1	10	641	619	31	3	QF for the 2011 EHF Cup
6	Bera Bera	26	14	1	11	739	693	29	2	
7	Elche	26	11	2	13	682	673	24	1	
8	Goya Almería	26	11	2	13	631	676	24	1	
9	Castro Urdiales	26	11	1	14	660	663	23	(N)	
10	Alcobendas	26	10	3	13	645	703	23		
11	Remudas	26	8	3	15	635	706	19		
12	Sagardía	26	7	1	18	610	753	15	(N)	
13	Gijón	26	4	4	18	584	672	12	4	Relegated to Division de Honor Plata
14	Ribarroja	26	0	0	26	517	856	0	(N)	Disbanded
