= 2008–09 Liga ABF =

Spanish women's handball season

The Liga ABF 2008–09 was the 52nd season of women's handball top flight in Spain since its establishment, running from 13 September 2008. to 23 May 2009. SD Itxako won the championship for the first time with a seven points advantage over Balonmano Sagunto. CBF Elda, Bera Bera, Mar Alicante and CB Elche followed in European positions, while CB Zuazo and CBF Monóvar were relegated.

== Standings ==
	Team	P	W	D	L	G+	G-	Dif	Pts	PS	Comments
1	(Navarre) Itxako	26	25	0	1	779	515	264	50	↑	Champions League
2	(Valencian Community) Sagunto	26	21	1	4	884	679	205	43	↑	Champions League
3	(Valencian Community) Elda	26	21	0	5	750	594	156	42	↓	EHF Cup
4	(Basque Country (autonomous community)) Bera Bera	26	20	0	6	764	681	83	40	↑	EHF Cup
5	(Valencian Community) Mar Alicante	26	17	2	7	726	658	68	36	↑	EHF Cup
6	(Valencian Community) Elche	26	14	0	12	680	684	–4	28	↑	EHF Cup
7	(Andalusia) Goya Almería	26	13	1	12	664	709	–45	27	↑	
8	(Castile and León) León	26	10	3	13	652	719	–67	23	↓	
9	(Asturias) Gijón	26	10	2	14	596	661	–65	22	↑	
10	(Community of Madrid) Alcobendas	26	6	2	18	642	743	–101	14	P	
11	(Canary Islands) Remudas	26	6	1	19	652	728	–76	13	↓	
12	(Valencian Community) Amadeo Tortajada	26	6	0	20	597	768	–171	12	↓	
13	(Basque Country (autonomous community)) Zuazo	26	4	0	22	613	708	–95	8	P	Relegated
14	(Valencian Community) Monóvar	26	3	0	23	629	781	–152	6	P	Relegated
