= 2006–07 Women's EHF Cup =

European handball tournament

Women's EHF Cup
- 2006-07

Tournament information
- Sport: Handball

Final positions
- Champions: (Russia) Zvezda Zvenigorod
- Runner-up: (Denmark) Ikast Bording EH

Tournament statistics
- Top scorer(s): (Romania) Oana Șoit (64 Goals)

The 2006–07 Women's EHF Cup was the 26th edition of the European Handball Federation's secondary competition for women's handball clubs, running from 14 September 2006 to 20 May 2007. Zvezda Zvenigorod defeated Ikast Bording EH in the final to become the first Russian team to win the competition.

== First qualifying round ==
Team #1	Agg.	Team #2	1st	2nd
Vicianet (Kosovo)	56–69	(Turkey) Anadolu SK	31–29	25–40
Bascharage (Luxembourg)	31–70	(Czech Republic) Slavia Prague	17–29	14–41
Latsia (Cyprus)	68–53	(Israel) Hapoel Petah Tikva	33–25	35–28
Garadag Baku (Azerbaijan)	44–47	(Belarus) Gorodnichanka	28–26	16–21
Athienou (Cyprus)	38–85	(Netherlands) Westfriesland	22–42	16–43
Lokomotiv Varna (Bulgaria)	44–48	(North Macedonia) Kale Kičevo	22–25	22–23
Juventus Melveren (Belgium)	35–41	(Belgium) Fémina Visé	19–19	16–22
Ljubuški (Bosnia and Herzegovina)	55–69	(Lithuania) Egle Vilnius	22–35	33–34
Zug (Switzerland)	70–48	(Latvia) Stopini	35–23	35–25

== Second qualifying round ==
Team #1	Agg.	Team #2	1st	2nd
Frankfurter HC (Germany)	60–55	(Sweden) Skövde HF	32–26	28–29
Galyvchanka Lviv (Ukraine)	41–44	(Norway) Nordstrand IF	22–22	19–22
Anadolu SK (Turkey)	51–60	(Serbia) Aranđelovac	28–29	23–31
HC Zalău (Romania)	54–42	(Czech Republic) Slavia Prague	30–22	24–20
DJK Trier (Germany)	58–47	(Italy) HC Sassari	28–22	30–25
ŽRK Ptuj (Slovenia)	68–28	(Cyprus) AC Latsia	36–11	32–17
Rostov-Don (Russia)	59–46	(Portugal) Madeira Andebol	29–22	30–24
Kiskunhalas (Hungary)	69–45	(Belarus) Gorodnichanka	34–22	35–23
IK Sävehof (Sweden)	54–51	(Netherlands) Westfriesland	32–30	22–21
Kale Kičevo (North Macedonia)	35–62	(Croatia) Lokomotiva Zagreb	16–32	19–30
Wiener Neustadt (Austria)	55–52	(Italy) Olimpica Dossobuono	27–26	28–26
Spono Nottwil (Switzerland)	56–29	(Belgium) Fémina Visé	32–17	24–12
FC Copenhagen (Denmark)	61–31	(Belarus) BNTU Minsk	40–14	21–17
SD Itxako (Spain)	66–25	(Greece) Ionias	37–15	29–10
Almeida Garrett (Portugal)	36–73	(Lithuania) Egle Vilnius	16–39	20–34
Zug (Switzerland)	54–63	(Netherlands) Van der Voort/Quintus	29–33	25–30

== Round of 32 ==
Team #1	Agg.	Team #2	1st	2nd
Frankfurter HC (Germany)	53–62	(Denmark) Ikast Bording EH	24–30	29–32
BM Sagunto (Spain)	66–56	(Norway) Nordstrand IF	33–25	33–31
Metz Handball (France)	61–43	(Serbia) Aranđelovac	34–18	27–25
HC Zalău (Romania)	53–62	(Hungary) Debrecen VSC	21–31	21–41
CBF Elda (Spain)	63–55	(Germany) DJK Trier	33–21	30–34
ŽRK Ptuj (Slovenia)	53–60	(Slovakia) Iuventa Michalovce	31–29	22–31
Rostov-Don (Russia)	40–56	(Hungary) Dunaújvárosi NKS	24–26	16–30
Kiskunhalas (Hungary)	67–54	(Slovenia) RK Žalec	36–27	31–27
IK Sävehof (Sweden)	50–66	(Ukraine) HC Motor Zaporizhzhia	22–32	28–34
Tertnes (Norway)	48–52	(Croatia) Lokomotiva Zagreb	20–28	28–24
Anagennisi Artas (Greece)	70–57	(Austria) Wiener Neustadt	35–27	35–30
Bayer Leverkusen (Germany)	78–46	(Switzerland) Spono Nottwil	39–26	39–20
FC Copenhagen (Denmark)	41–54	(Romania) Rulmentul Brașov	24–29	17–25
Merignac (France)	46–59	(Spain) SD Itxako	21–25	25–34
Egle Vilnius (Lithuania)	47–87	(Russia) Zvezda Zvenigorod	20–46	27–41
Lublin (Poland)	56–62	(Netherlands) Van der Voort/Quintus	27–32	29–30

== Round of 16 ==
Team #1	Agg.	Team #2	1st	2nd
Ikast Bording EH (Denmark)	66–60	(Spain) BM Sagunto	33–24	33–36
Metz Handball (France)	42–43	(Hungary) Debrecen VSC	25–23	17–20
CBF Elda (Spain)	58–53	(Slovakia) Iuventa Michalovce	35–24	23–29
Dunaújvárosi NKS (Hungary)	59–47	(Hungary) Kiskunhalas	31–20	28–27
HC Motor Zaporizhzhia (Ukraine)	52–50	(Croatia) Lokomotiva Zagreb	28–24	24–26
Anagennisi Artas (Greece)	56–64	(Germany) Bayer Leverkusen	27–33	29–31
Rulmentul Brașov (Romania)	39–35	(Spain) SD Itxako	21–14	18–21
Zvezda Zvenigorod (Russia)	80–63	(Netherlands) Van der Voort/Quintus	46–32	34–31

== Quarter-finals ==
Team #1	Agg.	Team #2	1st	2nd
Ikast Bording EH (Denmark)	52–51	(Hungary) Debrecen VSC	26–24	26–27
CBF Elda (Spain)	58–56	(Hungary) Dunaújvárosi NKS	34–28	24–28
HC Motor Zaporizhzhia (Ukraine)	52–51	(Germany) Bayer Leverkusen	27–26	23–25
Rulmentul Brașov (Romania)	37–60	(Russia) Zvezda Zvenigorod	19–25	18–35

== Semi-finals ==
Team #1	Agg.	Team #2	1st	2nd
Ikast Bording EH (Denmark)	64–62	(Spain) CBF Elda	36–35	28–27
Bayer Leverkusen (Germany)	50–53	(Russia) Zvezda Zvenigorod	23–21	27–32

== Final ==
Team #1	Agg.	Team #2	1st	2nd
Ikast Bording EH (Denmark)	57–62	(Russia) Zvezda Zvenigorod	35–30	22–32
