= 2007–08 Women's EHF Cup =

European handball tournament

Women's EHF Cup
- 2007–08

Tournament information
- Sport: Handball

Final positions
- Champions: (Russia) Dynamo Volgograd
- Runner-up: (Spain) SD Itxako

Tournament statistics
- Top scorer(s): (Norway) Gro Hammerseng (66 Goals)

The 2007–08 Women's EHF Cup was the 27th edition of the competition, running from 31 August 2007 to 24 May 2008. Dynamo Volgograd followed the steps of the previous edition's champion Zvezda Zvenigorod as the second Russian club to win the competition, beating SD Itxako in the final.

== First qualifying round ==
Team #1	Agg.	Team #2	1st match	2nd match
Lokomotiv Varna (Bulgaria)	60–68	(Switzerland) Spono Nottwil	28–32	32–26
Nikšić (Montenegro)	49–48	(Faroe Islands) Stjornan	26–20	23–28
Diekirch (Luxembourg)	41–57	(Azerbaijan) Garadag Baku	17–28	24–29

== Second qualifying round ==
Team #1	Agg.	Team #2	1st match	2nd match
HCM Baia Mare (Romania)	53–35	(Sweden) Skövde	23–13	30–22
Ikast Bording EH (Denmark)	94–22	(Italy) Salerno	44–14	50–8
Sassari (Italy)	50–53	(Lithuania) Egle Vilnius	24–31	26–22
Van der Voort/Quintus (Netherlands)	55–52	(Bosnia and Herzegovina) Borac Banja Luka	29–25	26–27
Elda (Spain)	52–51	(Denmark) Randers	28–24	24–27
Bayer Leverkusen (Germany)	77–29	(Luxembourg) Bascharage	35–11	42–18
Nikšić (Montenegro)	26–82	(Russia) Dynamo Volgograd	14–44	12–38
Levanger (Norway)	68–27	(Belarus) Druts	36–10	32–17
Panellinios Lefkosias (Cyprus)	31–90	(Poland) Zaglebie Lubin	17–49	14–41
Galychanka (Ukraine)	78–49	(Switzerland) Spono Nottwil	45–26	33–23
Kefalovrisos (Cyprus)	42–93	(Switzerland) Brühl	16–53	26–40
Vushtrri (Kosovo)	Walkover	(Serbia) Knjaz Miloš		
Garadag Baku (Azerbaijan)	34–84	(Hungary) Dunaferr NK	14–46	20–38
Rostov-Don (Russia)	57–63	(Croatia) Trogir	32–28	25–25
Dinamo Pančevo (Serbia)	61–39	(Greece) Ionias	29–19	32–20
Slavia Prague (Czech Republic)	46–38	(Austria) Atzgersdorf	21–18	25–20
Itxako (Spain)	61–34	(Portugal) Gil Eanes	34–18	27–16
Üsküdar Bld. SK (Turkey)	61–75	(Russia) Kuban Krasnodar	30–36	31–39
Alcoa FKC (Hungary)	65–38	(Belgium) Fémina Visé	37–17	28–21
Kale Kicevo (North Macedonia)	42–59	(France) US Mios-Biganos	21–30	21–29

== Round of 32 ==
Team #1	Agg.	Team #2	1st match	2nd match
HCM Baia Mare (Romania)	50–61	(Denmark) Ikast Bording EH	29–26	21–35
Egle Vilnius (Lithuania)	58–77	(Turkey) Maliye	32–31	26–46
Motor Zaporizhzhia (Ukraine)	63–37	(Netherlands) Van der Voort/Quintus	33–18	30–19
Elda (Spain)	56–53	(Spain) Sagunto	29–25	27–28
Bayer Leverkusen (Germany)	54–54 (a)	(Russia) Dynamo Volgograd	32–26	22–28
Iuventa Michalovce (Slovakia)	64–54	(Norway) Levanger	36–28	28–26
Lublin (Poland)	73–68	(Poland) Zaglebie Lubin	40–30	33–38
Galychanka (Ukraine)	62–61	(Belarus) BNTU Minsk	36–33	26–28
Byåsen (Norway)	78–45	(Switzerland) Brühl	40–25	38–20
Patras (Cyprus)	52–53	(Serbia) Knjaz Miloš	26–26	26–27
Dunaferr NK (Hungary)	61–49	(Russia) Rostov-Don	33–23	28–26
Madeira (Portugal)	48–62	(Serbia) Dinamo Pančevo	19–33	29–29
Slavia Prague (Czech Republic)	32–62	(France) Metz	17–36	15–26
Itxako (Spain)	54–42	(Russia) Kuban Krasnodar	30–17	24–25
Aalborg (Denmark)	54–56	(Hungary) Alcoa FKC	40–30	33–38

== Round of 16 ==
Team #1	Agg.	Team #2	1st match	2nd match
Ikast Bording EH (Denmark)	66–52	(Turkey) Maliye	36–22	30–30
Motor Zaporizhzhia (Ukraine)	43–50	(Spain) Elda	25–22	18–28
Dynamo Volgograd (Russia)	56–51	(Slovakia) Iuventa Michalovce	29–20	27–31
Mios Biganos (France)	53–55	(Poland) Lublin	26–26	27–29
Galychanka (Ukraine)	48–58	(Norway) Byåsen	26–27	22–31
Knjaz Miloš (Serbia)	53–83	(Hungary) Dunaferr NK	29–43	24–40
Dinamo Pančevo (Serbia)	51–59	(France) Metz	24–29	27–30
Itxako (Spain)	53–47	(Hungary) Alcoa FKC	27–21	26–26

== Quarter-finals ==
Team #1	Agg.	Team #2	1st match	2nd match
Ikast Bording EH (Denmark)	58–54	(Spain) Elda	32–31	26–23
Dynamo Volgograd (Russia)	58–54	(Poland) Lublin	30–20	29–32
Byåsen (Norway)	57–60	(Hungary) Dunaferr NK	29–28	28–32
Metz (France)	48–48 (a)	(Spain) Itxako	28–28	20–20

== Semifinals ==
Team #1	Agg.	Team #2	1st match	2nd match
Ikast Bording EH (Denmark)	65–70	(Russia) Dynamo Volgograd	37–31	28–39
Dunaferr NK (Hungary)	49–51	(Spain) Itxako	27–23	22–28

== Final ==
Team #1	Agg.	Team #2	1st match	2nd match
Dynamo Volgograd (Russia)	50–45	(Spain) Itxako	27–25	23–20
