= Oana Țiplea =

Romanian handball player (born 1981)

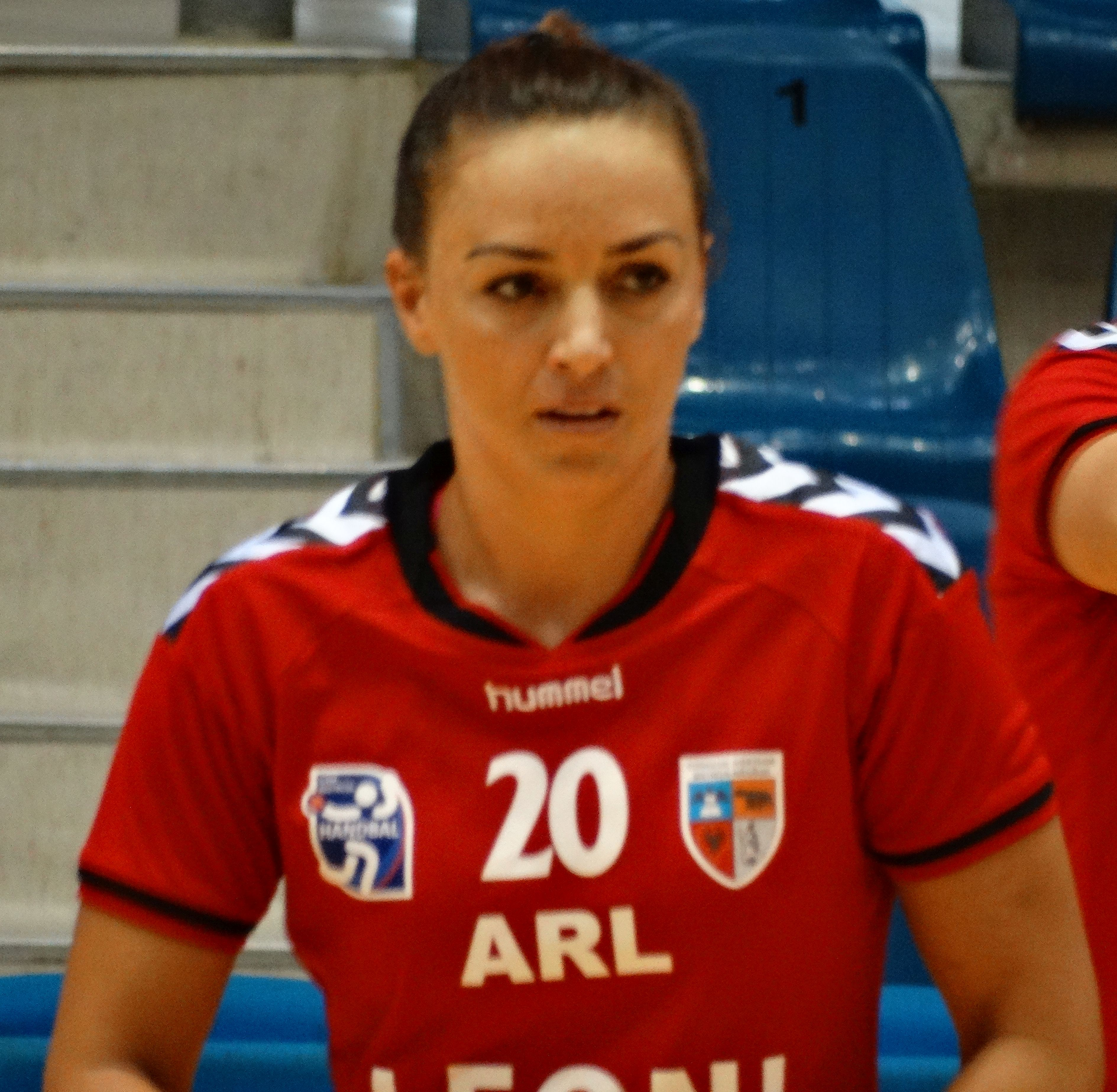

Personal information
- Full name: Oana Florica Țiplea
- Nationality: Romanian
- Born: 3 May 1981 (age 45) Cluj-Napoca, Romania
- Height: 1.78 m (5 ft 10 in)

Sport
- Sport: Handball
- Position: Right Back
- Current club: Măgura Cisnădie
- Number: 20

Senior clubs
- Years: Team
- 1998–2002: Universitatea Jolidon Cluj-Napoca
- 2002–2010: Elda Prestigio
- 2010–2011: SD Itxako
- 2011–2012: Oltchim Râmnicu Vâlcea
- 2014–2015: Alba Sebeş
- 2015-2019: Gloria Bistrița
- 2019-: Măgura Cisnădie
National team
Years	Team	Apps	(Gls)
–	Romania	74	(98)
Medal record
Youth European Championship
Gold medal – first place	1999 Germany	Team
Junior European Championship
Gold medal – first place	2000 France	Team
World University Championship
Gold medal – first place	2002 Spain	Team
World Championship
Silver medal – second place	2005 Russia	Team
European Championship
Bronze medal – third place	2010 Denmark & Norway	Team

Oana Țiplea, formerly known as Oana Chirilă or as Oana Şoit (born 3 May 1981) is a Romanian handball player who plays as a right back for Măgura Cisnădie.

== International honours ==
- EHF Champions League:
  - Finalist: 2011
- EHF Champions League:
  - Finalist: 2010
- World Championship:
  - Silver Medalist: 2005
- European Championship:
  - Bronze Medalist: 2010
- Junior European Championship:
  - Gold Medalist: 2000
- Youth European Championship:
  - Gold Medalist: 1999
- World University Championship:
  - Gold Medalist: 2002

== Individual awards ==
- All-Star Right Wing of the Youth European Championship: 1999
- All-Star Right Back of the Junior European Championship: 2000
- EHF Cup Top Scorer: 2007, 2010
