= 2010–11 Women's EHF Cup =

European handball tournament

Women's EHF Cup
- 2010–11

Tournament information
- Sport: Handball
- Dates: 4 September 2010–15 May 2011

Final positions
- Champions: (Denmark) FC Midtjylland
- Runner-up: (Denmark) Team Tvis Holstebro

Tournament statistics
- Top scorer(s): (Denmark) Kristina Kristiansen (Denmark) Ann Grete Nørgaard Østerballe (71 goals)

The 2010–11 Women's EHF Cup was the 30th edition of the competition, taking place from 4 September 2010 to 8 May 2011. Denmark's FC Midtjylland defeated compatriot Team Tvis Holstebro to win its second EHF Cup. It was the second time the final was played by two clubs from the same country.

== Qualifying rounds ==
=== Round 1 ===
Team #1	Agg.	Team #2	1st match	2nd match
Athieniou (Cyprus)	58–61	(Kosovo) Prishtina	36–34	22–27
Valur (Iceland)	56–51	(Slovakia) Iuventa Michalovce	26–21	30–30

=== Round 2 ===
Team #1	Agg.	Team #2	1st match	2nd match
León (Spain)	96–30	(North Macedonia) Kale Kičevo	50–16	46–14
Prishtina (Kosovo)	46–77	(Russia) Kuban Krasnodar	24–42	22–35
Ilidža (Bosnia and Herzegovina)	25–56	(Switzerland) Spono Nottwil	12–28	13–28
Gorodnichanka (Belarus)	48–67	(Sweden) Skövde	23–34	25–33
Békéscsabai ENKSE (Hungary)	54–54 (a)	(Slovenia) Olimpija Ljubljana	32–23	22–31
Tvis Holstebro (Denmark)	84–37	(Greece) Anagennisi Artas	49–18	35–19
Izmir (Turkey)	77–58	(Switzerland) Zug	37–26	40–32
Vistal Gdynia (Poland)	57–78	(Hungary) Váci NKSE	32–40	25–38
Femina Vise (Belgium)	34–71	(Romania) Dunărea Brăila	17–32	17–39
Buxtehuder (Germany)	75–37	(Ukraine) Motor Zaporizhzhia	37–21	38–16
Hellas Den Haag (Netherlands)	42–55	(Serbia) Naisa Niš	22–28	20–27
Le Havre (France)	53–40	(Portugal) João de Barros	24–21	29–19
Frisch Auf! Göppingen (Germany)	75–37	(Cyprus) Latsia	64–41	30–22
Teramo (Italy)	50–61	(Portugal) Gil Eanes	21–31	29–30
Oldenburg (Germany)	62–53	(Iceland) Valur	36–25	26–28
Zalău (Romania)	85–27	(Luxembourg) Dudelange	43–16	42–11

=== Round 3 ===
Team #1	Agg.	Team #2	1st match	2nd match
León (Spain)	52–57	(Spain) Sagunto	24–24	28–33
Kuban Krasnodar (Russia)	60–52	(Turkey) Maliye	33–26	27–26
Lada Togliatti (Russia)	67–36	(Switzerland) Spono Nottwil	37–24	30–12
Skövde (Sweden)	44–48	(North Macedonia) Metalurg Skopje	20–27	24–21
Spartak Kyiv (Ukraine)	51–54	(Slovenia) Olimpija Ljubljana	26–24	25–30
Tvis Holstebro (Denmark)	54–49	(Germany) Bayer Leverkusen	27–23	27–26
Izmir (Turkey)	44–58	(Norway) Byåsen	25–29	19–29
Váci NKSE (Hungary)	81–65	(Spain) Elda	38–30	43–35
AC Ormi-Loux Patras (Greece)	47–52	(Romania) Dunărea Brăila	21–22	26–30
Buxtehuder (Germany)	52–53	(Denmark) Esbjerg	29–25	23–28
Naisa Niš (Serbia)	49–62	(Denmark) Midtjylland	23–31	26–31
Lublin (Poland)	44–48	(France) Le Havre	22–24	22–24
Vejen (Denmark)	65–48	(Germany) Frisch Auf! Göppingen	28–19	37–29
Gil Eanes (Portugal)	59–68	(Netherlands) VOC Amsterdam	30–34	29–34
Universitatea Cluj (Romania)	58–67	(Germany) Oldenburg	28–30	30–37
Zalău (Romania)	51–55	(Serbia) Zaječar	29–25	22–30

== Last 16 ==
Team #1	Agg.	Team #2	1st match	2nd match
Sagunto (Spain)	74–59	(Russia) Kuban Krasnodar	42–31	32–28
Lada Togliatti (Russia)	59–40	(North Macedonia) Metalurg Skopje	31–17	28–23
Olimpija Ljubljana (Slovenia)	30–102	(Denmark) Tvis Holstebro	11–54	19–48
Byåsen (Norway)	58–60	(Hungary) Váci NKSE	34–29	24–31
Dunărea Brăila (Romania)	42–46	(Denmark) Esbjerg	20–21	22–25
Midtjylland (Denmark)	52–37	(France) Le Havre	28–14	24–23
Vejen (Denmark)	65–46	(Netherlands) VOC Amsterdam	37–22	28–24
Oldenburg (Germany)	81–56	(Serbia) Zaječar	42–25	39–31

== Quarter-finals ==
Team #1	Agg.	Team #2	1st match	2nd match
Sagunto (Spain)	40–51	(Russia) Lada Togliatti	23–28	19–23
Tvis Holstebro (Denmark)	65–60	(Hungary) Váci NKSE	36–32	29–28
Esbjerg (Denmark)	50–51	(Denmark) Midtjylland	21–27	29–24
Vejen (Denmark)	50–55	(Germany) Oldenburg	24–26	26–29

== Semifinals ==
Team #1	Agg.	Team #2	1st match	2nd match
Lada Togliatti (Russia)	51–52	(Denmark) Tvis Holstebro	32–26	19–26
Midtjylland (Denmark)	52–48	(Germany) Oldenburg	27–19	25–29

== Final ==
Team #1	Agg.	Team #2	1st match	2nd match
Tvis Holstebro (Denmark)	47–52	(Denmark) Midtjylland	26–24	21–28
