= Cristina González Ramos =

Spanish handball player (born 1983)

Cristina González
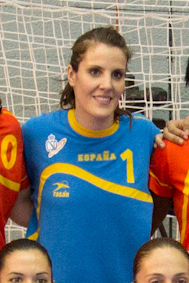
- González Ramos in 2013

Personal information
- Full name: Cristina González Ramos
- Nationality: Spanish
- Born: 6 August 1983 (age 43) Salamanca, Spain
- Height: 1.78 m (5 ft 10 in)

Sport
- Sport: Handball
- Position: Goalkeeper

Senior clubs
- Years: Team
- 2001–2002: Ferrobús Mislata
- 2002–2017: Club León
National team
Years	Team	Apps	(Gls)
2006-2014	Spain	142	(0)
Medal record
Representing Spain
World Championship
Bronze medal – third place	2011 Brazil	Team
European Championship
Silver medal – second place	2008 Macedonia	Team

Cristina González Ramos (born 6 August 1983) is a retired Spanish handball goalkeeper. She played on the Spanish women's national team.

She was part of the Spanish team at the 2008 European Women's Handball Championship, where the Spanish team reached the final, after defeating Germany in the semifinal. She competed at the 2011 World Women's Handball Championship in Brazil, where the Spanish team placed third.
