= CP Goya Almería =

Spanish handball club

- Full name: Club Polideportivo Goya Almería
- Short name: CP Goya
- Founded: 1980
- Arena: Palacio de Deportes, Vícar
- Capacity: 3,000
- President: José Miguel Galera (ESP)
- Head coach: Miguel Ángel Florido (ESP)
- League: División de Plata
- 2013–14: División de Plata, 2nd
Home	Away

Club Polideportivo Vícar Goya Almería is a Spanish women's handball club from Vícar, Almería currently playing in second-tier División de Honor Plata.

Founded in 1980 in the Cruz de Caravaca district's Francisco de Goya school, Goya Almería played in the División de Honor between 1999 and 2011, with a 4th place (2001) as it best result. It also played the EHF Cup in 2001 and 2002. Following the end of the 2010-11 season it sold its spot in the category to BM Remudas due to financial strain.

== Season to season ==
Season	Tier	Division	Pos.	Notes
1998–99	1	División de Honor	10th	
1999–00	1	División de Honor	6th	
2000–01	1	División de Honor	4th	
2001–02	1	División de Honor	6th	
2002–03	1	División de Honor	6th	
2003–04	1	División de Honor	6th	
2004–05	1	División de Honor	6th	
2005–06	1	División de Honor	7th	
2006–07	1	División de Honor	10th	
2007–08	1	División de Honor	10th	
2008–09	1	División de Honor	7th	
2009–10	1	División de Honor	8th	
2010–11	1	División de Honor	12th	Relegated
2011–12	2	División de Plata	8th	Relegated
2012–13	3	Primera Nacional	1st	Promoted
2013–14	2	División de Plata	2nd	

- 13 seasons in División de Honor
