= BM Gijón =

Spanish handball club

Balonmano Gijón
- Full name: Club Balonmano Gijón
- Founded: 1985
- Arena: La Tejerona, Gijón, Asturias, Spain
- Capacity: 900
- President: Javier Díaz Llorente
- Head coach: Rodrigo Llordén
- League: División de Plata
- 2018–19: División de Plata, 5th
Home	Away

Balonmano Gijón is a women's handball team based in Gijón, Asturias which currently plays in División de Plata, the second division in the Spanish league system. It played several seasons in Liga ABF, the top league, last time in the 2011–12 season, where it was relegated.

== Season by season ==
Season	Tier	Division	Pos.	Notes
1997–98	2	1ª Estatal	8th	
1998–99	2	1ª Estatal	6th	
1999–00	2	1ª Estatal	10th	
2000–01	2	1ª Estatal	8th	
2001–02	2	1ª Estatal	5th	
2002–03	2	1ª Estatal	1st	
2003–04	2	1ª Estatal	1st	Promoted
2004–05	1	Div. Honor	10th	
2005–06	1	Div. Honor	10th	
2006–07	1	Div. Honor	11th	
2007–08	1	Div. Honor	12th	

Season	Tier	Division	Pos.	Notes
2008–09	1	Div. Honor	9th	
2009–10	1	Div. Honor	13th	Relegated
2010–11	2	Plata	1 / 1	Promoted
2011–12	1	Div. Honor	14th	Relegated
2012–13	2	Plata	5th	
2013–14	2	Plata	3rd	
2014–15	2	Plata	4th	
2015–16	2	Plata	3rd	
2016–17	2	Plata	2nd	
2017–18	2	Plata	5th	

== Notable players ==
- (Spain) Jessica Alonso
- (Argentina) Marisol Carratu
- (Dominican Republic) Yacaira Tejeda
- (Spain) Ana Temprano
- (Dominican Republic) Débora Torreira
