= Club León Balonmano =

Spanish handball club

- Full name: Club León Balonmano
- Short name: Cleba León
- Founded: 1996
- Arena: Palacio Municipal de Deportes; León, Spain
- Capacity: 6,500 seats
- President: Juan José Marcos
- Head coach: Guillermo Algorri
- League: División de Plata (Group A)
- 2020–21: División de Plata (Group A), 2nd
- Club colours
Home	Away

Club León Balonmano, also known as León BM or Cleba León, is a Spanish women's handball team from León, Castile and León, Spain.

== History ==
Club León Balonmano was established in 1996 through a merger of Deleba and Atlético León.

== Trophies ==
- Copa ABF: 2
  - 2006, 2011

== Season to season ==
Season	Tier	Division	Pos.	Notes
1996–97	2	Primera Nacional	4th (Group A)	
1997–98	2	Primera Nacional	2nd	Promoted
1998–99	1	División de Honor	12th	
1999–00	1	División de Honor	8th	
2000–01	1	División de Honor	8th	
2001–02	1	División de Honor	11th	
2002–03	1	División de Honor	15th	Relegated
2003–04	2	Primera Nacional	2nd (Group A)	Promoted
2004–05	1	División de Honor	12th	
2005–06	1	División de Honor	8th	
2006–07	1	División de Honor	6th	
2007–08	1	División de Honor	7th	
2008–09	1	División de Honor	8th	
2009–10	1	División de Honor	5th	
2010–11	1	División de Honor	6th	
2011–12	1	División de Honor	8th	

Season	Tier	Division	Pos.	Notes
2012–13	1	División de Honor	7th	
2013–14	1	División de Honor	10th	
2014–15	1	División de Honor	11th	
2015–16	1	División de Honor	10th	
2016–17	1	División de Honor	14th	Relegated
2017–18	2	División de Plata (Group A)	1st	
2018–19	2	División de Plata (Group A)	3rd	
2019–20	2	División de Plata (Group A)	4th	
2020–21	2	División de Plata (Group A)	2nd	
2021–22	2	División de Plata (Group A)	3rd	

- 18 seasons in División de Honor

== Notable players ==
- (Spain) Nuria Benzal
- (Spain) Raquel Caño
- (Brazil) Fabiana Diniz
- (Brazil) Deonise Fachinello
- (Cuba) Yunisleidy Camejo
- (Spain) Cristina González Ramos
- (Cuba) Ayling Martínez
- (Argentina) Luciana Mendoza
- (Brazil) Mayara Moura
- (Spain) María Prieto O'Mullony
