= 1981–82 Women's IHF Cup =

European handball tournament

The 1981–82 Women's IHF Cup was the inaugural edition of the competition, taking place between 9 January 1982 and 7 May 1982. Eleven teams from Belgium, France, East Germany, West Germany, Hungary the Netherlands, Norway, Romania, the Soviet Union, Sweden and Yugoslavia took part in it. RK Trešnjevka won the trophy by beating Egle Vilnius by a minimal difference in a two-legged final.

== Qualifying round ==
Team #1	Agg.	Team #2	1st match	2nd match
Initia Hasselt (Belgium)	22–44	(Germany) GuttMuths Berlin	14–19	8–25
Racing Club de France	32–34	(Sweden) Göteborgs Kvinnliga	15–16	17–18
Swift Roermond (Netherlands)	35–33	(Norway) Sverresborg IF	18–14	17–19

== Quarter-finals ==
Team #1	Agg.	Team #2	1st match	2nd match
GuttMuths Berlin (Germany)	27–34	(East Germany) TSC Berlin	13–14	14–20
Bakony Veszprém (Hungary)	40–44	(Socialist Federal Republic of Yugoslavia) Trešnjevka	22–19	18–25
Göteborgs Kvinnliga (Sweden)	28–31	(Netherlands) Swift Roermond	18–19	10–12
Egle Vilnius (Soviet Union)	46–42	(Romania) Știința Bacău	26–19	20–23

== Semi-finals ==
Team #1	Agg.	Team #2	1st match	2nd match
TSC Berlin (East Germany)	33–38	(Socialist Federal Republic of Yugoslavia) Trešnjevka	20–18	13–20
Swift Roermond (Netherlands)	38–50	(Soviet Union) Egle Vilnius	18–23	20–27

== Final ==
Team #1	Agg.	Team #2	1st match	2nd match
Trešnjevka (Socialist Federal Republic of Yugoslavia)	47–46	(Soviet Union) Egle Vilnius	30–27	17–19
