= AD Sagardía =

Spanish women's handball club

- Full name: Agrupación Deportiva Sagardía
- Short name: AD Sagardía
- Founded: 1984
- Dissolved: 2013
- Arena: La Albericia, Santander
- Capacity: 600
- League: División de Plata
- 2012–13: División de Plata, 10th
Home	Away

Agrupación Deportiva Sagardía was a Spanish women's handball club from Santander, Cantabria, founded in 1984. It takes its name from the school in the city's Peñacastillo district where it was born in 1978. Nowadays it is settled in the La Albericia district. The club has also been known as Bansander, Verdaloe, Caja Cantabria and Marina Park for sponsorship reasons.

Sagardía has played seven seasons in the División de Honor from 1996 to 2011 with modest results, avoiding relegation in two occasions. In 2012 it registered in the third tier for financial reasons, subsequently earning promotion for the second category.

== Season to season ==
Season	Tier	Division	Pos.	Notes
1998–99	1	División de Honor	14th	Relegated
1999–00	2	Primera Nacional	5th	Promoted
2000–01	1	División de Honor	15th	Relegated
2001–02	2	Primera Nacional	1st	
2002–03	2	Primera Nacional	6th	
2003–04	2	Primera Nacional	3rd	
2004–05	2	Primera Nacional	1st	
2005–06	2	Primera Nacional	1st	Promoted
2006–07	1	División de Honor	12th	
2007–08	1	División de Honor	14th	Relegated
2008–09	2	Primera Nacional	2nd	Promoted
2009–10	1	División de Honor	12th	
2010–11	1	División de Honor	14th	Relegated
2011–12	3	Primera Nacional	2nd	Promoted
2012–13	2	División de Plata	10th	Disbanded
