= 1986–87 Women's IHF Cup =

European handball tournament

The 1986–87 Women's IHF Cup was the sixth edition of IHF's second-tier women's handball competition.

1985 Cup Winners' Cup champion Budućnost Titograd defeated Štart Bratislava in the final, overcoming an away loss by a 5-goal margin, to become the second Yugoslav team to win the competition. They previously defeated defending champion SC Leipzig and 1983 champion Avtomobilist Baku on away goals.

== Results ==
First round
(Spain) CB Leganés	17	20	37
(West Germany) VfL Oldenburg	20	29	49
(Czechoslovakia) Štart Bratislava	23	28	51
(East Germany) SC Magdeburg	26	23	49
(Sweden) Stockholmspolisens	21	19	40
(Hungary) Spartacus Budapest	21	26	47
(Netherlands) Vonk Mosam	20	16	36
(Belgium) Sasja Antwerpen	10	9	19
(Soviet Union) Avtomobilist Baku	25	29	54
(Norway) Byåsen IL	18	20	38
(France) USM Gagny	24	24	48
(Austria) WAT Fünfhaus	10	13	23
(Socialist Federal Republic of Yugoslavia) Budućnost Titograd	30	18	48
(Romania) Rulmentul Brașov	18	27	45

Quarter-finals
(West Germany) VfL Oldenburg	20	17	37
(Czechoslovakia) Štart Bratislava	22	28	50
(Hungary) Spartacus Budapest	29	18	47
(Netherlands) Vonk Mosam	22	18	40
(Soviet Union) Avtomobilist Baku	30	22	52
(France) USM Gagny	10	18	28
(East Germany) SC Leipzig	29	18	47
(Socialist Federal Republic of Yugoslavia) Budućnost Titograd	21	26	47

Semi-finals
(Czechoslovakia) Štart Bratislava	27	23	50
(Hungary) Spartacus Budapest	18	31	49
(Soviet Union) Avtomobilist Baku	28	19	47
(Socialist Federal Republic of Yugoslavia) Budućnost Titograd	24	23	47

Final
(Czechoslovakia) Štart Bratislava	23	27	50
(Socialist Federal Republic of Yugoslavia) Budućnost Titograd	21	34	55
