= 2009–10 Women's EHF Cup =

European handball tournament

Women's EHF Cup
- 2009–10

Tournament information
- Sport: Handball

Final positions
- Champions: (Denmark) Randers HK
- Runner-up: (Spain) Elda Prestigio

Tournament statistics
- Top scorer(s): (Romania) Oana Șoit (82 Goals)

The 2009–10 Women's EHF Cup was the 29th edition of the competition. It was won by Randers HK, beating Spanish runner-up CBF Elda in the final. This was the sixth trophy won by a Danish club, now leading the rankings, and the second international title for Randers, which had previously won the 2000 EHF Challenge Cup.

== First qualifying round ==
Team #1	Agg.	Team #2	1st leg	2nd leg
Antwerpen (Belgium)	49–76	(Slovenia) Zagorje	25–32	24–43
Hellas Den Haag (Netherlands)	84–38	(Cyprus) Latsia	50–17	34–21
Skövde (Sweden)	70–34	(Italy) Bancole	38–13	32–21
Kosova (Kosovo)	46–68	(Bulgaria) Lokomotiv Varna	25–36	21–32
Druts (Belarus)	73–41	(Israel) Bnei Herzliya	40–23	33–18

== Second qualifying round ==
Team #1	Agg.	Team #2	1st leg	2nd leg
Nordstrand (Norway)	57–57	(France) Cercle Nimes	32–30	25–27
Fémina Visé (Belgium)	53–65	(Serbia) Vrnjačka Banja	24–28	29–37
Kuban Krasnodar (Russia)	51–42	(Croatia) Lokomotiva Zagreb	25–23	26–19
Kefalovrisos (Cyprus)	30–86	(Norway) Tertnes	21–43	9–43
Madeira (Portugal)	59–55	(Slovenia) Zagorje	34–26	25–29
Oţelul Galaţi (Romania)	59–65	(Serbia) Kikinda	27–28	32–37
Bayer Leverkusen (Germany)	66–38	(Slovenia) Žalec	34–18	32–20
Sävehof (Sweden)	72–38	(Bulgaria) Lokomotiv Varna	38–21	34–17
Colégio Gaia (Portugal)	24–79	(Denmark) Randers	9–42	15–37
Wiener Neustadt (Austria)	45–74	(Netherlands) Hellas Den Haag	23–36	22–38
Alba Fehérvár KC (Hungary)	54–48	(Turkey) Izmir	29–26	25–22
Știința Baia Mare (Romania)	79–45	(Greece) Anagennisi Artas	37–23	37–36
Minsk Region (Belarus)	44–57	(Hungary) Békéscsabai ENKSE	20–31	24–26
Le Havre (France)	62–45	(Sweden) Skövde	34–20	28–25
Kale Kičevo (North Macedonia)	45–60	(Spain) Elche	23–31	22–29
Druts (Belarus)	60–60	(Switzerland) Zug	33–28	27–32

== Round of 32 ==
Team #1	Agg.	Team #2	1st leg	2nd leg
Elda (Spain)	67–52	(France) Cercle Nimes	35–23	32–29
Smart Kryvyi Rih (Ukraine)	69–47	(Serbia) Vrnjačka Banja	38–19	31–28
Ormi Patras (Greece)	50–55	(Russia) Kuban Krasnodar	28–29	22–26
Aarhus (Denmark)	58–43	(Norway) Tertnes	35–20	23–23
VOC Amsterdam (Netherlands)	60–51	(Portugal) Madeira	36–29	24–22
Kikinda (Serbia)	56–53	(Spain) Mar Alicante	28–28	28–25
Olimpija Ljubljana (Slovenia)	46–59	(Germany) Bayer Leverkusen	21–24	25–35
Brühl (Switzerland)	46–64	(Sweden) Sävehof	29–35	17–29
Ferencvárosi TC (Hungary)	52–63	(Denmark) Randers	25–30	27–33
ŠKP Bratislava (Slovakia)	55–48	(Netherlands) Hellas Den Haag	28–29	27–19
Alba Fehérvár KC (Hungary)	52–63	(Poland) Lublin	27–24	20–28
Rulmentul Braşov (Romania)	59–63	(Romania) Știința Baia Mare	31–26	28–37
Békéscsabai ENKSE (Hungary)	54–56	(Spain) Sagunto	30–30	24–26
Maliye (Turkey)	47–66	(France) Le Havre	23–29	24–37
Elche (Spain)	50–55	(Russia) Rostov-Don	24–22	21–28
Zug (Switzerland)	54–48	(Italy) Sassari	30–26	24–22

== Round of 16 ==
Team #1	Agg.	Team #2	1st leg	2nd leg
Elda (Spain)	58–45	(Ukraine) Smart Krivyi Rih	35–15	23–30
Kuban Krasnodar (Russia)	66–61	(Denmark) Aarhus	29–25	37–36
VOC Amsterdam (Netherlands)	59–66	(Serbia) Kikinda	28–32	31–34
Bayer Leverkusen (Germany)	53–48	(Sweden) Sävehof	28–22	25–26
Randers (Denmark)	62–56	(Slovakia) ŠKP Bratislava	31–26	31–30
Lublin (Poland)	66–61	(Romania) Știința Baia Mare	24–19	30–27
Sagunto (Spain)	42–60	(France) Le Havre	24–30	18–30
Rostov-Don (Russia)	76–37	(Switzerland) Zug	36–18	40–19

== Quarter-finals ==
Team #1	Agg.	Team #2	1st leg	2nd leg
Elda (Spain)	57–41	(Russia) Kuban Krasnodar	32–16	25–25
Kikinda (Serbia)	47–78	(Germany) Bayer Leverkusen	22–41	25–37
Randers (Denmark)	58–50	(Poland) Lublin	34–24	24–26
Le Havre (France)	50–37	(Russia) Rostov-Don	30–18	20–19

== Semifinals ==
Team #1	Agg.	Team #2	1st leg	2nd leg
Elda (Spain)	55–54	(Germany) Bayer Leverkusen	27–23	28–31
Randers (Denmark)	58–50	(France) Le Havre	30–23	28–27

== Final ==
Team #1	Agg.	Team #2	1st leg	2nd leg
Elda (Spain)	46–50	(Denmark) Randers	22–20	24–30

== Top goalscorers ==
As of 13 May 2010

Rank	Player	Club	Goals
1	(Romania) Oana Șoit	(Spain) Elda	82
2	(Denmark) Mie Augustesen	(Denmark) Randers HK	70
3	(Romania) Melinda Geiger	(Romania) HCM Stiința Baia Mare	59
