= AC Latsia Nicosia =

- Full name: AC Latsia Nicosia
- Founded: 1993; 32 years ago ground =
- League: A1 Andrón
- 2015–2016: 1st

AC Latsia Nicosia is a women's handball club from Latsia in Cyprus. AC Latsia competes in the A1 Andrón.

== Titles ==
- A1 Andrón
  - Winners (12) : 2000, 2004, 2005, 2006, 2010, 2012, 2013, 2015, 2016
- Cyprus Handball Cup
  - Winners (7) : 1996, 1998, 1999, 2005, 2010, 2012, 2013

== European record ==
Season	Competition	Round	Club	1st leg	2nd leg	Aggregate
2016–17	EHF Cup	R1	(Serbia) ŽRK Izvor Bukovička Banja	20–33	14–38	34–71

== Team ==
=== Current squad ===
Squad for the 2016–17 season

Goalkeepers

- (Cyprus) Natasa Koliantri
- (Lithuania) Virginija Skucaite
- (Cyprus) Antria Taki

Wingers
RW

- (Cyprus) Marianna Charalambous
- (Cyprus) Marilena Solea

LW

- (Serbia) Andjela Dimitrijevic
- (Cyprus) Vaso Ioannou
- (Cyprus) Alexandra Konstantinidou

Line players

- (Cyprus) Elisabet Ellina
- (Cyprus) Christina Georgiou

Back players
LB

- (Cyprus) Paraskevi Kasapi
- (Cyprus) Rena Tsangari
- (Cyprus) Elena Vrahimi

CB

- (Cyprus) Hermes Christodoulou
- (Cyprus) Malvina Elia
- (Cyprus) Irene Kasapi
- (Lithuania) Vitaliya Lebelionyte

RB

- (Cyprus) Olga Manora
- (Bulgaria) Victoria Svetlinova
