= SD Itxako =

Spanish handball club

Itxako
- Short name: Sociedad Deportiva Itxako
- Founded: 1990
- Dissolved: 2013
- Arena: Polideportivo Municipal Lizarrerria, Estella
- Capacity: 2,000 seats
- President: Miguel Bujanda
- League: None
- 2012–13: División de Honor, 11th
- Club colours
Home	Away

Sociedad Deportiva Itxako, known as Asfi Itxako for sponsorship reasons, was a Spanish women's handball team from Estella-Lizarra, Navarre. Itxako were four times Spanish league winners and the EHF Women's Champions League runners-up.

== History ==
Itxako Reyno de Navarra is the professional top level women's team of the S.D. Itxako (Spanish: Sociedad Deportiva Itxako, Itxako Sports Society). The S.D. was founded in 1972. The women's handball department started in 1990 with a young age category team. Ten years later, in 2000, the senior team won the promotion to the top division for women's clubs in Spain, Honor Division (Spanish: División de Honor).

Itxako's first appearance in a European competition was the Women's EHF Cup 2003/04. They were defeated at the eight-finals by Győri Audi ETO KC. In 2008 they finished second in the Spanish league, tied in points with the winner Elda Prestigio. Also during that season Itxako reached the finals of the EHF Cup but lost the title to Russian club HC Dinamo Volgograd. 2009 brought the first title of the club when Itxako secured the first place at the Spanish league. The success was doubled when they won the EHF Cup against German club HC Leipzig.

The club didn't enrolled any handball team for 2013–14 season as they are experiencing serious financial problems from 2011 after losing main sponsor Asfi. Finally, on 17 October 2013, the club was liquidated by a court order.

== Trophies ==
- Spanish League (Liga ABF):
  - Winner (4): 2009, 2010, 2011, 2012
  - Runner-up: 2008
- Queen's Cup (Copa de S.M. la Reina)
  - Winner (3): 2010, 2011, 2012
- Supercopa de España
  - Winner (3): 2010, 2011, 2012
- Spanish Cup (Copa ABF)
  - Runner-up: 2004, 2008
  - Semifinalist: 2008
- EHF Champions League
  - Runner-up: 2011
- Cup Winners' Cup
  - Quarter-finalist: 2006
- EHF Cup
  - Winner (1): 2009
  - Finalist: 2008

== Season to season ==
Season	Tier	Division	Pos.	Notes
1998–99	3	Segunda Nacional	1st (Sector A)	Promoted
1999–00	2	Primera Nacional	1st (Group B)	Promoted
2000–01	1	División de Honor	9th	
2001–02	1	División de Honor	7th	
2002–03	1	División de Honor	4th	
2003–04	1	División de Honor	5th	
2004–05	1	División de Honor	4th	
2005–06	1	División de Honor	4th	

Season	Tier	Division	Pos.	Notes
2006–07	1	División de Honor	4th	
2007–08	1	División de Honor	2nd	
2008–09	1	División de Honor	1st	League champion
2009–10	1	División de Honor	1st	League/Cup champion
2010–11	1	División de Honor	1st	League/Cup champion
2011–12	1	División de Honor	1st	League/Cup champion
2012–13	1	División de Honor	11th	
2013–14	—	DNP	—	

- 13 seasons in División de Honor

== Notable former players ==
- (Spain) Macarena Aguilar
- (Spain) Nely Carla Alberto
- (Spain) Jessica Alonso
- (Spain) Leire Aramendia
- (Spain) Alexandrina Barbosa
- (Spain) Andrea Barnó
- (Russia) Svetlana Bogdanova
- (France) Marion Callavé
- (Romania) Oana Şoit
- (Spain) Verónica Cuadrado
- (France) Véronique Démonière
- (Spain) Naiara Egozkue
- (Spain) Begoña Fernández
- (Brazil) Deonise Fachinello
- (Romania) Simona Gogîrlă
- (South Korea) Lee Sang-eun
- (Portugal) Vera Lopes
- (Spain) Carmen Martín
- (Montenegro) Mirjana Milenković
- (Spain) Silvia Navarro
- (Spain) Nerea Pena
- (Spain) Elisabeth Pinedo
- (Hungary) Anett Sopronyi
- (France) Raphaëlle Tervel
- (Russia) Emiliya Turey
- (Netherlands) Marieke van der Wal
- (Croatia) Maja Zebić

== Notable coaches ==
- (Spain) Ambros Martín

== Stadium ==
- Name: Polideportivo Municipal Tierra Estella - Lizarrerria
- City: Estella-Lizarra, Navarre, Spain
- Capacity: 2,000 seats
- Address: La Merindad, s/n
