= EHF Women's European League =

Handball European cup

- Current season, competition or edition: 2026–27 Women's EHF European League
- Sport: Handball
- Founded: 1981
- No. of teams: 32
- Country: EHF members
- Continent: Europe
- Most recent champions: (France) JDA Bourgogne Dijon HB (1st title)
- Most titles: (Denmark) Ikast Håndbold (Denmark) Viborg HK (3 titles each)
- Related competitions: EHF Champions League
- Website: ehfel.eurohandball.com

The Women's EHF European League is an annual competition for women's handball clubs of Europe. It is organized by the EHF. It is currently the second-tier competition of European club handball, ranking only below the EHF Champions League.

Previously called the Women's EHF Cup, the competition is known as the Women's EHF European League from the 2020–21 season.

== History ==
The first edition took place in 1981. It was called the IHF Cup until 1993. From the 2016–17 season, the competition merged with the EHF Cup Winners' Cup.

=== Tournament structure ===
The EHF Cup is a competition divided into seven rounds: Round 1, Round 2, Round 3, Group Phase, Quarter-finals, Semi-finals and Final.

== Summary ==
=== Women's IHF Cup ===
| Year | Final | | | Semi Final Losers |
| Year | Champion | Score | Second Place | Semi Final Losers |
|---|---|---|---|---|---|
| 1981–82; Details | (Socialist Federal Republic of Yugoslavia); Trešnjevka Zagreb | 30–27; 17–19 | (Soviet Union); Eglė Vilnius | (East Germany); TSC Berlin | (Netherlands); Swift Roermond |
| 1982–83; Details | (Soviet Union); Avtomobilist Baku | 20–14; 18–15 | (East Germany); Empor Rostock | (Czechoslovakia); Topolniky | (Hungary); Veszprém |
| 1983–84; Details | (Romania); Râmnicu Vâlcea | 22–18; 29–21 | (West Germany); VfL Oldenburg | (Czechoslovakia); Iskra Partizánske | (Hungary); Budapesti Spartacus |
| 1984–85; Details | (East Germany); Vorwärts Frankfurt | 17–19; 19–13 | (Hungary); Vasas Budapest | (Czechoslovakia); Iskra Partizánske | (West Germany); Lützellinden |
| 1985–86; Details | (East Germany); Leipzig | 16–22; 25–15 | (Hungary); Debrecen | (Czechoslovakia); Druzstevnik Topolniky | (Sweden); Tyresö HF |
| 1986–87; Details | (Socialist Federal Republic of Yugoslavia); Budućnost Titograd | 21–23; 34–27 | (Czechoslovakia); Start Bratislava | (Soviet Union); Avtomobilist Baku | (Hungary); Budapesti Spartacus |
| 1987–88; Details | (Soviet Union); Eglė Vilnius | 34–20; 22–32 | (Socialist Federal Republic of Yugoslavia); Budućnost Titograd | (Socialist Federal Republic of Yugoslavia); Belinka Ljubljana | (East Germany); TSC Berlin |
| 1988–89; Details | (Romania); Râmnicu Vâlcea | 26–18; 21–26 | (Soviet Union); Eglė Vilnius | (West Germany); Bayer Leverkusen | (Hungary); Budapesti Spartacus |
| 1989–90; Details | (East Germany); Vorwärts Frankfurt | 19–22; 21–16 | (Soviet Union); Spartak Kyiv | (Romania); Mureșul Târgu Mureș | (Hungary); Budapesti Spartacus |
| 1990–91; Details | (Socialist Federal Republic of Yugoslavia); Lokomotiva Zagreb | 19–11; 19–20 | (Germany); Bayer Leverkusen | (Denmark); Frederiksberg | (East Germany); Vorwärts Frankfurt |
| 1991–92; Details | (Germany); Leipzig | 24–19; 28–18 | (Czechoslovakia); Tempo Partizánske | (Soviet Union); Kuban Krasnodar | (Romania); Zalău |
| 1992–93; Details | (Romania); Rapid București | 28–16; 22–24 | (France); Dijon | (Norway); Gjerpen | (Germany); Leipzig |

=== Women's EHF Cup ===
| Year | Final | | | Semi Final Losers |
| Year | Champion | Score | Second Place | Semi Final Losers |
|---|---|---|---|---|---|
| 1993–94; Details | (Denmark); Viborg | 23–20; 21–24 | (Hungary); Debrecen | (France); Dijon | (Spain); Valencia Urbana |
| 1994–95; Details | (Hungary); Debrecen | 22–14; 22–30 | (Norway); Baekkelaget Oslo | (Germany); Buxtehuder | (Slovakia); Slovan Duslo Šaľa |
| 1995–96; Details | (Hungary); Debrecen | 20–23; 18–15 | (Norway); Larvik | (Spain); Valencia Urbana | (Russia); Rostov-Don |
| 1996–97; Details | (Slovenia); Olimpija Ljubljana | 26–18; 26–30 | (Germany); Borussia Dortmund | (Hungary); Vasas Budapest | (Romania); Oţelul Galaţi |
| 1997–98; Details | (Hungary); Dunaújváros | 26–22; 34–27 | (Slovakia); Banská Bystrica | (Romania); Oţelul Galaţi | (Spain); Elda Prestigio |
| 1998–99; Details | (Denmark); Viborg | 21–24; 28–21 | (Hungary); Győr | (Norway); Tertnes | (Poland); GKS Piotrkovia |
| 1999–00; Details | (Spain); El Ferrobus Mislata | 24–22; 18–19 | (Norway); Tertnes | (Germany); Borussia Dortmund | (Slovakia); Slovan Duslo Šaľa |
| 2000–01; Details | (Poland); Lublin | 28–21; 24–24 | (Croatia); Podravka Koprivnica | (Czech Republic); Slavia Praha | (Poland); Zagłębie Lubin |
| 2001–02; Details | (Denmark); Ikast | 25–30; 36–23 | (Hungary); Győr | (Germany); TV Giessen-Lützellinden | (Norway); Baekkelaget Oslo |
| 2002–03; Details | (Denmark); Slagelse | 22–27; 27–20 | (Hungary); Dunaújváros | (Hungary); Alba Fehérvár | (Ukraine); Motor Zaporizhzhia |
| 2003–04; Details | (Denmark); Viborg | 27–27; 37–21 | (Hungary); Győr | (Norway); Nordstrand | (Norway); Vipers Kristiansand |
| 2004–05; Details | (Hungary); Alba Fehérvár | 21–27; 28–19 | (Hungary); Győr | (Germany); HC Leipzig | (Hungary); Ferencváros |
| 2005–06; Details | (Hungary); Ferencváros | 37–36; 33–32 | (Croatia); Podravka Koprivnica | (Hungary); Debrecen | (Ukraine); Motor Zaporizhzhia |
| 2006–07; Details | (Russia); Zvezda Zvenigorod | 25–30; 32–22 | (Denmark); Ikast | (Spain); Elda Prestigio | (Germany); Bayer Leverkusen |
| 2007–08; Details | (Russia); Dinamo Volgograd | 27–25; 23–20 | (Spain); Itxako Navarra | (Hungary); Dunaújváros | (Denmark); Ikast |
| 2008–09; Details | (Spain); Itxako Navarra | 27–19; 25–26 | (Germany); HC Leipzig | (Romania); Rulmentul Braşov | (Russia); Dinamo Volgograd |
| 2009–10; Details | (Denmark); Randers | 20–22; 30–24 | (Spain); Elda Prestigio | (Germany); Bayer Leverkusen | (France); Le Havre |
| 2010–11; Details | (Denmark); Ikast | 26–24; 21–28 | (Denmark); Holstebro | (Germany); Oldenburg | (Russia); Lada Togliatti |
| 2011–12; Details | (Russia); Lada Togliatti | 30–24; 20–21 | (Romania); Zalău | (Denmark); Vejen | (Spain); Mar Alicante |
| 2012–13; Details | (Denmark); Holstebro | 31–35; 33–28 | (France); Metz | (Romania); Zalău | (Denmark); Ikast |
| 2013–14; Details | (Russia); Lada Togliatti | 36–25; 32–23 | (Denmark); Esbjerg | (Russia); Astrakhanochka | (Hungary); Alba Fehérvár |
| 2014–15; Details | (Denmark); Holstebro | 33–20; 22–33 | (Russia); Rostov-Don | (Turkey); Muratpaşa | (Hungary); Érd |
| 2015–16; Details | (Hungary); Dunaújváros | 26–28; 29–21 | (Germany); Metzingen | (Denmark); Randers | (Romania); Corona Braşov |
| 2016–17; Details | (Russia); Rostov-Don | 28–25; 25–21 | (Germany); Bietigheim | (Denmark); Nykøbing | (Germany); Metzingen |
| 2017–18; Details | (Romania); Craiova | 22–26; 30–25 | (Norway); Vipers Kristiansand | (Denmark); Viborg | (Turkey); Kastamonu Belediyesi |
| 2018–19; Details | (Hungary); Siófok | 21–21; 26–21 | (Denmark); Esbjerg | (Denmark); Viborg | (Denmark); Ikast-Herning |
| 2019–20; Details | Cancelled due to the COVID-19 pandemic | | | Cancelled due to the COVID-19 pandemic |

=== Women's EHF European League ===
| Year | Final – Four (2020/21 to present) | | | | | |
|---|---|---|---|---|---|---|
| Year | Champion | Score | Second place | Third place | Score | Fourth place |
| 2020–21; Details | (France); Nantes Atlantique | 36–31 | (Hungary); Siófok | (Romania); Minaur Baia Mare | 33–31 | (Denmark); Ikast-Herning |
| 2021–22; Details | (Germany); Bietigheim | 31–20 | (Denmark); Viborg | (Denmark); Herning-Ikast | 29–28 | (Romania); Minaur Baia Mare |
| 2022–23; Details | (Denmark); Ikast | 31–24 | (Denmark); Nykøbing Falster | (Germany); Borussia Dortmund | 28–23 | (Germany); Thüringer |
| 2023–24; Details | (Norway); Storhamar | 29–27 | (Romania); Gloria Bistrița | (France); Neptunes de Nantes | 39–38 | (Romania); Dunărea Brăila |
| 2024–25; Details | (Germany); Thüringer HC | 34–32 | (Denmark); Ikast Håndbold | (France); JDA Bourgogne Dijon | 32–27 | (Germany); HSG Blomberg-Lippe |
| 2025–26; Details | (France); JDA Bourgogne Dijon | 29–25 | (Germany); Thüringer HC | (Denmark); Viborg HK | 35–30 | (Hungary); MOL Esztergom |

== Statistics ==
=== By club ===
| Club | Winner | Runner-up | Years won | Years runner-up |
|---|---|---|---|---|
| (Denmark) Ikast | 3 | 2 | 2002, 2011, 2023 | 2007, 2025 |
| (Denmark) Viborg | 3 | 1 | 1994, 1999, 2004 | 2022 |
| (Hungary) Debrecen | 2 | 2 | 1995, 1996 | 1986, 1994 |
| (Hungary) Dunaújváros | 2 | 1 | 1998, 2016 | 2003 |
| (Germany) (East Germany) Leipzig | 2 | 1 | 1986, 1992 | 2009 |
| (Denmark) Holstebro | 2 | 1 | 2013, 2015 | 2011 |
| (Romania) Râmnicu Vâlcea | 2 | 0 | 1984, 1989 | – |
| (Germany) (East Germany) Frankfurt an der Oder | 2 | 0 | 1985, 1990 | – |
| (Russia) (Soviet Union) Lada Togliatti | 2 | 0 | 2012, 2014 | – |
| (Lithuania) (Soviet Union) Eglė Vilnius | 1 | 2 | 1988 | 1982, 1989 |
| (Montenegro) (Socialist Federal Republic of Yugoslavia) Budućnost Podgorica | 1 | 1 | 1987 | 1988 |
| (Spain) Itxako Navarra | 1 | 1 | 2009 | 2008 |
| (Russia) (Soviet Union) Rostov-Don | 1 | 1 | 2017 | 2015 |
| (Hungary) Siófok | 1 | 1 | 2019 | 2021 |
| (Germany) Bietigheim | 1 | 1 | 2022 | 2017 |
| (Germany) Thüringer HC | 1 | 1 | 2025 | 2026 |
| (France) JDA Bourgogne Dijon | 1 | 1 | 2026 | 1993 |
| (Croatia) (Socialist Federal Republic of Yugoslavia) Trešnjevka Zagreb | 1 | 0 | 1982 | – |
| (Azerbaijan) (Soviet Union) Avtomobilist Baku | 1 | 0 | 1983 | – |
| (Croatia) (Socialist Federal Republic of Yugoslavia) Lokomotiva Zagreb | 1 | 0 | 1991 | – |
| (Romania) Rapid București | 1 | 0 | 1993 | – |
| (Slovenia) (Socialist Federal Republic of Yugoslavia) Olimpija Ljubljana | 1 | 0 | 1997 | – |
| (Spain) Mislata | 1 | 0 | 2000 | – |
| (Poland) Lublin | 1 | 0 | 2001 | – |
| (Denmark) Slagelse | 1 | 0 | 2003 | – |
| (Hungary) Alba Fehérvár | 1 | 0 | 2005 | – |
| (Hungary) Ferencváros | 1 | 0 | 2006 | – |
| (Russia) (Soviet Union) Zvezda Zvenigorod | 1 | 0 | 2007 | – |
| (Russia) (Soviet Union) Dinamo Volgograd | 1 | 0 | 2008 | – |
| (Denmark) Randers | 1 | 0 | 2010 | – |
| (Romania) Craiova | 1 | 0 | 2018 | – |
| (France) Nantes Atlantique | 1 | 0 | 2021 | – |
| (Norway) Storhamar | 1 | 0 | 2024 | – |
| (Hungary) Győr | 0 | 4 | – | 1999, 2002, 2004, 2005 |
| (Croatia) (Socialist Federal Republic of Yugoslavia) Podravka Koprivnica | 0 | 2 | – | 2001, 2006 |
| (Denmark) Esbjerg | 0 | 2 | – | 2014, 2019 |
| (Germany) (East Germany) Empor Rostock | 0 | 1 | – | 1983 |
| (Germany) Oldenburg | 0 | 1 | – | 1984 |
| (Hungary) Vasas Budapest | 0 | 1 | – | 1985 |
| (Slovakia) (Czechoslovakia) Start Bratislava | 0 | 1 | – | 1987 |
| (Ukraine) (Soviet Union) Spartak Kyiv | 0 | 1 | – | 1990 |
| (Germany) Bayer Leverkusen | 0 | 1 | – | 1991 |
| (Slovakia) (Czechoslovakia) Tempo Partizánske | 0 | 1 | – | 1992 |
| (Norway) Bækkelaget | 0 | 1 | – | 1995 |
| (Norway) Larvik | 0 | 1 | – | 1996 |
| (Germany) Borussia Dortmund | 0 | 1 | – | 1997 |
| (Slovakia) Banská Bystrica | 0 | 1 | – | 1998 |
| (Norway) Tertnes | 0 | 1 | – | 2000 |
| (Spain) Elda Prestigio | 0 | 1 | – | 2010 |
| (Romania) Zalău | 0 | 1 | – | 2012 |
| (France) Metz | 0 | 1 | – | 2013 |
| (Germany) Metzingen | 0 | 1 | – | 2016 |
| (Norway) Vipers Kristiansand | 0 | 1 | – | 2018 |
| (Denmark) Nykøbing Falster | 0 | 1 | – | 2023 |
| (Romania) Gloria Bistrița | 0 | 1 | – | 2024 |
| Total | 44 | 44 | | |

=== By country ===
| # | Country | Winners | Runners-up | Total finals |
|---|---|---|---|---|
| 1 | Denmark | 10 | 7 | 17 |
| 2 | Hungary | 7 | 9 | 16 |
| 3 | Russia | 5 | 1 | 6 |
| 4 | Romania | 4 | 2 | 6 |
| 5 | Germany | 3 | 8 | 11 |
| 6 | France | 3 | 2 | 5 |
| 7 | East Germany | 3 | 1 | 4 |
| 7 | Yugoslavia | 3 | 1 | 4 |
| 9 | Soviet Union | 2 | 3 | 5 |
| 10 | Spain | 2 | 2 | 4 |
| 11 | Norway | 1 | 4 | 5 |
| 12 | Slovenia | 1 | 0 | 1 |
| 12 | Poland | 1 | 0 | 1 |
| 14 | Croatia | 0 | 2 | 2 |
| 14 | Czechoslovakia | 0 | 2 | 2 |
| 16 | Slovakia | 0 | 1 | 1 |
| Total | | 45 | 45 | 90 |

=== Top Scorers by Season ===
| Season | Player | Club | Goals |
|---|---|---|---|
| 2005/06 | (Hungary) Tímea Tóth | (Hungary) FTC Budapest | 73 |
| 2006/07 | (Romania) Oana Şoit | (Spain) Elda Prestigio | 64 |
| 2007/08 | (Norway) Gro Hammerseng | (Denmark) FC Midtjylland | 66 |
| 2008/09 | (Norway) Mette Ommundsen | (Germany) HC Leipzig | 68 |
| 2009/10 | (Romania) Oana Şoit (2) | (Spain) Elda Prestigio | 82 |
| 2010/11 | (Denmark) Kristina Kristiansen (Denmark) Ann Grete Nørgaard | (Denmark) Team Tvis Holstebro | 71 |
| 2011/12 | (Russia) Ekaterina Davydenko | (Russia) Handball Club Lada | 60 |
| 2012/13 | (Denmark) Ann Grete Nørgaard | (Denmark) Team Tvis Holstebro | 92 |
| 2013/14 | (Sweden) Johanna Ahlm (Netherlands) Estavana Polman | (Denmark) Team Esbjerg | 59 |
| 2014/15 | (Sweden) Nathalie Hagman | (Denmark) Team Tvis Holstebro | 73 |
| 2015/16 | (Germany) Anna Loerper (Hungary) Krisztina Triscsuk (Romania) Cristina Zamfir | (Germany) TuS Metzingen (Hungary) Dunaújvárosi Kohász KA (Romania) Corona Brașov | 57 |
| 2016/17 | (Germany) Susann Müller | (Germany) SG BBM Bietigheim | 77 |
| 2017/18 | (Norway) Linn Jørum Sulland | (Norway) Vipers Kristiansand | 78 |
| 2018/19 | (Croatia) Andrea Kobetić | (Hungary) Siófok KC | 75 |
| 2019/20 | (Russia) Elena Mikhaylichenko | (Russia) Handball Club Lada | 75 |
| 2020/21 | (Brazil) Bruna de Paula | (France) Neptunes de Nantes | 68 |
| 2021/22 | (Norway) Camilla Herrem | (Norway) Sola HK | 74 |
| 2022/23 | (Germany) Annika Lott | (Germany) Thüringer HC | 86 |
| 2023/24 | (Norway) Anniken Obaidli | (Norway) Storhamar HE | 82 |
| 2024/25 | (Austria) Johanna Reichert | (Germany) Thüringer HC | 110 |
| 2025/26 | (Austria) Johanna Reichert (2) | (Germany) Thüringer HC | 111 |

== See also ==
- EHF European League
- Women's EHF Champions League
