= CBF Elda =

Spanish handball club

Elda Prestigio
- Short name: Club Balonmano Femenino Elda
- Founded: 1985
- Arena: Pabellón Municipal Ciudad de Elda, Elda
- Capacity: 3,000 seats
- President: José Joaquín Verdú
- Head coach: Pepe Rizo
- League: División de Plata
- 2015–16: División de Plata, 6th
- Club colours
Home	Away

Club Balonmano Femenino Elda, also known as Elda Prestigio for sponsorship reasons, is a Spanish women's handball team from Elda, Valencian Community founded in 1985.

Elda was promoted in 1992 to the División de Honor, where it played for the next two decades. In the late 1990s it became a national powerhouse, winning four leagues and two national cups between 1999 and 2008. The team's major success in European competition was reaching the 2005 Champions League quarter-finals and the 2010 EHF Cup final, lost to Randers HK. It also reached the EHF Cup and Cup Winners' Cup's semifinals in 1998, 2002 and 2007.

In June 2012 Elda asked to be relegated to the third tier due to financial strain.

== Titles ==
- Liga ABF (4)
  - 1999, 2003, 2004, 2008
- Copa de la Reina (2)
  - 2002, 2005
- Supercopa de España (2)
  - 2004, 2008
- Copa ABF (1)
  - 2005

== Season to season ==
Season	Tier	Division	Pos.	Notes
1991–92	2	Primera Nacional	2nd	Promoted
1992–93	1	División de Honor	8th	
1993–94	1	División de Honor	7th	
1994–95	1	División de Honor	5th	
1995–96	1	División de Honor	3rd	
1996–97	1	División de Honor	3rd	
1997–98	1	División de Honor	3rd	
1998–99	1	División de Honor	1st	League champion
1999–00	1	División de Honor	3rd	
2000–01	1	División de Honor	3rd	
2001–02	1	División de Honor	3rd	Cup champion
2002–03	1	División de Honor	1st	League champion
2003–04	1	División de Honor	1st	League champion

Season	Tier	Division	Pos.	Notes
2004–05	1	División de Honor	2nd	Cup champion
2005–06	1	División de Honor	3rd	
2006–07	1	División de Honor	3rd	
2007–08	1	División de Honor	1st	League champion
2008–09	1	División de Honor	3rd	
2009–10	1	División de Honor	2nd	
2010–11	1	División de Honor	2nd	
2011–12	1	División de Honor	9th	Relegated
2012–13	3	Primera Nacional	1st	
2013–14	3	Primera Nacional	1st	Promoted
2014–15	2	División de Plata	5th	
2015–16	2	División de Plata	6th	

- 20 seasons in División de Honor
