= List of handball clubs in England =

List of handball clubs in England sorted by England Handball Association (EHA) league:

== 2023 onward ==
=== Men's senior competitions ===
==== EHA Premier League ====
	Premier League North	Premier League South
2024/25	Nottingham	Olympia HC
2024/25	Liverpool	Islington Handball Club
2024/25	Loughborough	Oxford Handball Club
2024/25	NEM Hawks	London GD
2024/25	Manchester-Trafford	Carshalton Titans
2024/25	Birmingham Bisons	Chelsea

	Premier League North	Premier League South
2023/24	Nottingham	Olympia Handball Club
2023/24	Liverpool	Islington Handball Club
2023/24	Loughborough	West London Eagles
2023/24	NEM Hawks	London GD
2023/24	Manchester-Trafford	Carshalton Titans
2023/24	Birmingham Bisons	Chelsea

==== EHA Regional Leagues (RL) ====
	RL North	RL South 1	RL South 2 East	RL South 2 West/Central
2023/24	Birmingham Bisons 2	Oxford University	West London Eagles 2	Poole Phoenix Handball
2023/24	Sheffield Handball Club	Northampton	Chelsea 2	Guildford Sabres
2023/24	Nottingham 3	Bristol	Brighton	Bucks Mavericks
2023/24	Liverpool 2	Islington Handball Club 2	Arctic Falcons	Somerset Spartans
2023/24	University of Birmingham	Cambridge	Bishop's Stortford	Bristol 2
2023/24	Loughborough 2	London GD 2	Islington Handball Club 3	
2023/24	Nottingham 2			
2023/24	Manchester-Trafford 2			

=== Women's senior competitions ===
==== EHA Premier League ====
	Premier League North	Premier League South
2024/25	Loughborough	London GD
2024/25	Trafford	Northampton
2024/25	Nottingham	Olympia HC
2024/25	NEM Hawks	West London Eagles
2024/25	Liverpool	Chelsea
2024/25	Birmingham Bisons	Islington Handball Club

	Premier League North	Premier League South
2023/24	Loughborough	London GD
2023/24	Trafford	Northampton
2023/24	Nottingham	Olympia HC
2023/24	NEM Hawks	West London Eagles
2023/24	Liverpool	Chelsea
2023/24	Birmingham	Cambridge

==== EHA Regional Leagues (RL) ====
	RL South
2023/24	West London Eagles 2
2023/24	Islington Handball Club
2023/24	Chelsea 2
2023/24	Arctic Falcons
2023/24	Oxford
2023/24	Olympia 2
2023/24	Bristol
2023/24	Poole Phoenix

== 2012 to 2023 ==
=== Men's Clubs ===
==== Men's Super 8 English National League ====
The 2012/13 season saw the introduction of the Men's Super 8 English National League consisting of the top eight teams in England.

2012/13	2013/14	2014/15	2015/16	2016/17
London GD HC	London GD HC	London GD HC	London GD HC	London GD HC
Salford HC	Salford HC	Warrington Wolves	Warrington Wolves	Warrington Wolves
Manchester HC	Manchester HC	Manchester HC	Manchester HC	Nottingham
Ruislip Eagles HC	Ruislip Eagles HC	Ruislip Eagles HC	Ruislip Eagles HC	West London Eagles
Leeds Hornets HC	Leeds Hornets HC	Leeds Hornets HC	Leeds Hornets HC	Coventry Sharks
Cambridge HC	Cambridge HC	Cambridge HC	Cambridge HC	Cambridge HC
Deva HC	Deva HC	Coventry HC	NEM Hawks	NEM Hawks
Liverpool HC	Olympia HC	Olympia HC	Olympia HC	Olympia HC

==== Championship North ====
Teams for the 2016/17 season:

- Bolton Hussars
- Deva HC
- Liverpool HC
- Manchester HC
- University of Loughborough

==== Championship South ====
Teams for the 2016/17 season:

- Brighton Seahawks
- Carshalton Titans
- Cranfield
- Islington
- Oly Cats
- Poole Phoenix

==== South West Regional Development League ====
Teams for the 2016/17 season:

- Bath Bombs HC
- Bristol HC
- Poole Phoenix - 2nd VII
- Reading Lions
- Southampton University
- South Wales Handball
- Stroud
- University of Bath

==== South East Regional Development League ====
Teams for 2016/17 season:

===== Tier 1 =====
- Cambridge HC 2nd Team
- London GD HC 2nd Team
- Olympia (London) HC 2nd Team
- Thames HC
- West London Eagles 2nd Team

===== Tier 2A =====
- Essex Handball Club
- Medway HC
- Norwich HC
- University of Kent

===== Tier 2B =====
- Chelsea HC
- Islington HC 2nd Team
- Newham Flames
- Oxford University

==== Midlands Regional Development League ====
Teams for 2016/17 season:

- Coventry Sharks 2nd Team
- Nottingham 2nd Team
- University of Birmingham HC
- University of Lincoln HC
- University of Loughborough HC
- Warwick University HC

=== North Regional Development League ===
Teams for 2016/17 season:

- Leeds Carnegie Handball Club
- Liverpool Speke Garston
- Manchester HC 2nd Team
- Newcastle Vikings
- Sunderland Handball Club
- University of Leeds

=== Women's Clubs ===
==== Women's Premier Handball League ====
Teams for 2016/17

- Cambridge HC
- Coventry Sharks
- London Angels
- London GD Handball Club
- NEM Hawks
- Olympia HC
- West London Eagles HC

==== South West Regional Development League ====
Teams for the 2016/17 season

- Bristol HC
- Poole Phoenix
- Reading Lionesses
- Southampton University
- Stroud
- University of Bath

==== North Regional Development League ====
Teams for 2016/17 season

- Leeds Carnegie Handball Club
- Liverpool HC
- Manchester HC
- Newcastle Vikings
- Peninsula
- University of Leeds

==== Midlands Regional Development League ====
Teams for 2016/17 season

- Cranfield
- University of Birmingham HC
- University of Loughborough HC
- University of Loughborough HC 2nd team
- Warwick University HC

==== South East Regional Development League ====
Teams for 2016/17 season

===== Tier 1 =====
- Islington
- London GD HC 2nd Team
- Medway Dragons
- Olympia (London) HC 2nd Team
- Oxford University

===== Tier 2 =====
- Brighton HC
- Chelsea HC
- Norwich HC
- University of Kent

== Community Based ==
- Aberystwyth
- Brighton Handball Club
- Cardiff
- City of Nottingham Handball Club
- Coventry
- Eastbourne
- Gedling
- Islington Handball Club
- Chelsea Handball Club
- Newcastle Vikings
- Poole Phoenix
- Peterborough
- Reading
- South Birmingham Handball Club
- Stansted Supers
- Stroud Handball Club
- Swansea
- Urban Handball
- York
- Shropshire Handball
- Trafford Handball

== University Based ==
- Bangor
- Bath
- Bournemouth
- Brighton
- Brunel
- Bristol
- Cambridge
- Chichester
- Durham
- Essex
- Health Sciences
- Imperial College London
- King’s College London
- Lancaster
- Leicester
- Leeds
- Liverpool
- Liverpool John Moores
- Loughborough
- Manchester
- Nottingham
- Nottingham Trent
- Oxford
- Portsmouth
- Sheffield
- Birmingham
- University College London
- Warwick

== Defunct ==
=== The Hull Continental Handball League ===
Handball, the eleven-a-side field version, is known to have been played in Hull from 1958 to 1963. There was also a junior section. The clubs known to have competed in the league are

- Asbestos
- Crawford Sports
- Hull Boys Club
- Constable St YC
- Pickering
- BOCM
- Newland Panthers
- City Police
- South Newington
- Blackburn's
- Wold Carr
- Nomads
- Marist OB
- Shipman's
- Dee Street Recs
- Hessle PA
- Whirlwinds
- Saints
- Fish Trades
- Canaries
- Silcock's
- Vikings
- Imperial Typewriters
- Electricity

=== Other Former Clubs ===
- Bebbington Boys
- Brentwood '72
- Coventry folded in 1983. A new club with the same name was established in 2012
- Harrow Tech
- Ipswich, has now been re established within Ipswich
- John Quinn (Sheffield)
- Leicester '73
- Leicester Computer
- Leigh
- Killingworth Braves (Newcastle)
- Kingston Polytechnic
- Milton Keynes 1980
- Nuneaton Newdigate
- Nuneaton Tech
- Pink Panthers (Hull University 1989)
- Rose Heath
- Wakefield Metros
- Whitchurch (Bristol)
- Wolverhampton Polytechnic '83
