= Zooey Perry =

British handball player

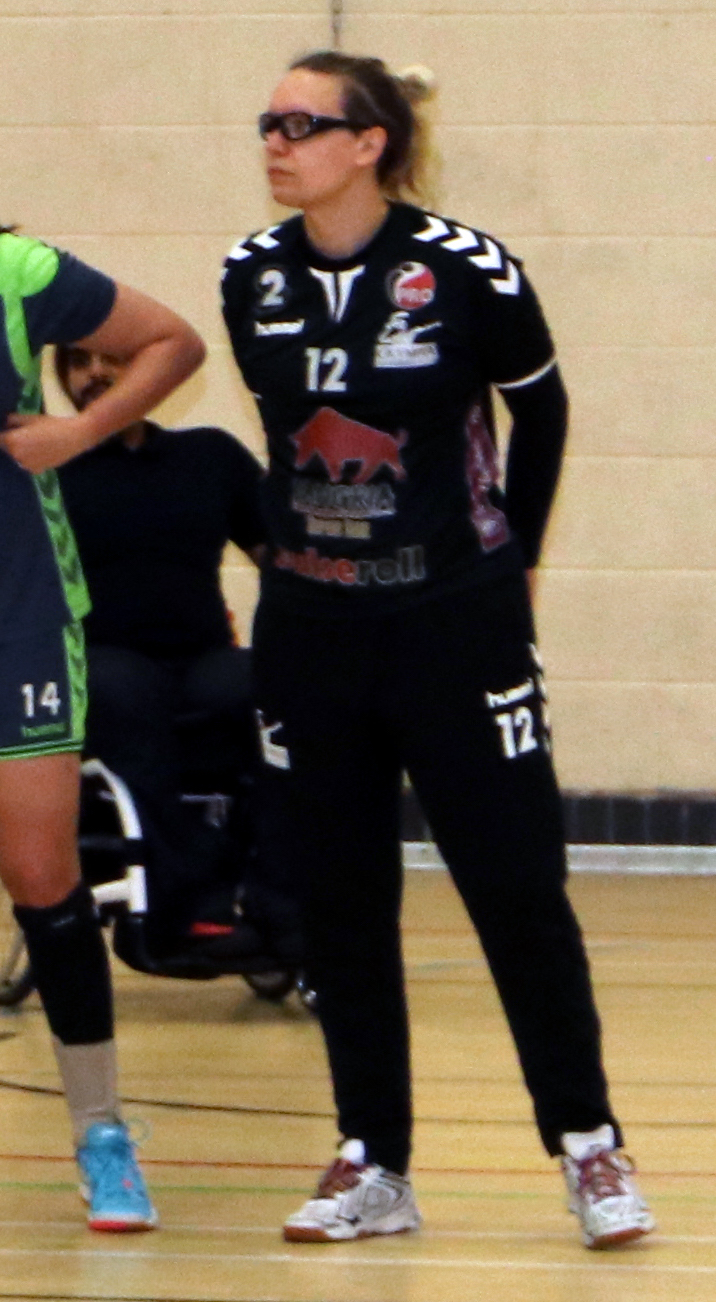
- Perry with Olympia HC in Liverpool, May 2019

Personal information
- Full name: Zooey Elizabeth Regina Perry
- Born: 22 September 1996 (age 30) Billingham, England
- Height: 1.82 m (6 ft 0 in)

Sport
- Sport: Handball
- Position: Goalkeeper
- Current club: Skedsmo HK
- Number: 40

Youth career
- Years: Team
- 2016–2020: Middlesex University HC

Senior clubs
- Years: Team
- 2018–2020: Olympia HC
- 2018-19: → Olympia HC 2
- 2020: London GD
- 2020: → London GD 2
- 2020-2023: Lambertseter IF
- 2020-2023: → Lambertseter IF 2
- 2023–: Skedsmo HK

Zooey Elizabeth Regina Perry (born 22 September 1996) is a British handball player who plays for Skedsmo HK, a team based in Skedsmokorset, Norway, and compete in the Norwegian 3rd division (4th tier).

== College career ==
Upon starting her undergraduate degree at Middlesex University, Perry joined the Women's Handball team. Initially, she played in the right-back/wing position due to being a left-handed thrower but moved to the goalkeeping position towards the end of the season due to injuries. In the 2016–2017 season, the team lost the LUSL (London University Sports Leagues) Handball League to UCL.

In Perry's second season, she was named the captain of the Women's team. The team were crowned champions of the LUSL Handball League in 2017–2018 without losing a single game, and enjoyed its best result in the British University Handball Championships since winning the tournament in 2015–2016, finishing in third place after losing 12–7 to eventual winners Loughborough University.

At the annual Middlesex University Sports Awards on 18 May 2018, Perry was announced as the winner of the 'Captain of the Year' award for her work in developing the club and leading them to a successful season.

Between 2018 and 2020, Perry remained captain of the Women's team, but they played only once in two seasons, as the number of new players was small in comparison to the number of players who left after the 2017–2018 season.

== Senior career ==
=== Olympia HC ===
Zooey Perry signed for Olympia HC prior to the 2018–2019 season. The team went undefeated during the season and won the Premier Handball League (PHL) title. Perry did not appear in the 2018–2019 Premier League season for Olympia, playing instead with the club's development team in the Regional Handball League – South East. She first played for the Premier League squad in the Liverpool International Handball Tournament on 25–26 May; Olympia won the tournament, defeating the previous year's winners, Bergen of Norway.

On 19 October 2019, Perry made her Premier Handball League debut for Olympia in a 23–22 loss to North East Manchester Hawks. Her first Premier League win came two weeks later, in a narrow 22–21 win vs West London Eagles Handball Club on 2 November.

In an Instagram post, Perry confirmed that she had parted company with Olympia due to 'out-of-Handball commitments' on 23 December. In the same post, she confirmed that she had transferred to the previous season's Premier League runners-up and Olympia's rivals, London GD.

=== London GD ===
Perry joined the travelling London GD squad for their 21–20 win vs NEM Hawks on 11 January 2020, before making her debut 15 days later in GD's 33–25 win against West London Eagles Handball Club.

=== Lambertseter IF ===
In September 2020, Perry relocated to Oslo, Norway to sign with Lambertseter IF in the Norwegian 3rd & 4th divisions. Due to the COVID-19 pandemic, she would not make her debut until 30 September 2021, as Lambertseter 2 lost the opening game of the 4th division season to Kjelsås IL 3.

=== Skedsmo HK ===
In August 2023, it was confirmed that Perry had accepted an offer to play for Skedsmo HK in the Norwegian 3rd division.

== Personal life ==
Perry came out as transsexual while attending Northfield School & Sports College at the age of 13 and began to transition in September 2013. After Olympia HC's 2018–2019 league-winning final game of the season, Perry became the first openly transsexual player in British Handball history, as well as the first to be a member of a Premier Handball League-winning team. Upon making her Handball debut in Norway, she also became the first openly transsexual active player in Norwegian handball history.

After attending Middlesex University between 2016 and 2020, Perry became a Bachelor of Fine Arts, achieving a 2:2 degree.

Perry is a lifelong fan of her hometown football team Middlesbrough FC.

Since September 2020, she has been a Pro Ambassador for Athlete Ally, a nonprofit LGBTQ+ athletic advocacy group that is "committed to making athletic communities more inclusive and less discriminatory and helping athletes to advocate for LGBTQ+ equality". In her introduction piece, she revealed that she had lost her mother to cancer in 2014.
