= 2016–17 Super 8 (Handball League) =

Super 8 (Handball League)
- Season: 2016-17
- Champions: Warrington Wolves
- Relegated: Coventry Sharks
- EHF Challenge Cup: Cambridge Handball Club; London GD Handball Club
- Matches played: 56

The 2016/17 Super 8 was the 29th Season of the Super 8 (Handball League), and the 5th since re-organising to the Super 8 name and format in 2012.

Warrington Wolves win the League while Hawks finish second.

== Teams ==
Locations of 2016/17 Super 8 Teams

The following 8 teams competed in the 2016/17 Super 8 (Handball League)

- Cambridge HC
- Coventry Sharks
- London GD Handball Club
- NEM Hawks
- Nottingham
- Olympia
- Warrington Wolves
- West London Eagles

== League table ==
Pos	Team	Pld	W	D	L	GF	GA	GD	Pts	Qualification or relegation
1	Warrington Wolves	14	12	1	1	0	0	0	25	Qualification to EHF Cup
2	NEM Hawks	14	10	0	4	0	0	0	20	Qualification to EHF Challenge Cup
3	London GD Handball Club	14	8	1	5	0	0	0	17	Qualification to EHF Challenge Cup
4	Cambridge HC	14	8	0	6	0	0	0	16	
5	Olympia	14	7	1	6	0	0	0	15	
6	West London Eagles	14	5	0	9	0	0	0	10	
7	Nottingham	14	4	0	10	0	0	0	8	
8	Coventry Sharks	14	0	1	13	0	0	0	1	Relegation to 2017–18 National Handball League North/South

Rules for classification: 1) Points; 2) Goal difference; 3) Goals scored.
