= Bristol Handball Club =

English handball club

- Full name: Bristol Handball Club
- Nickname: The Rats
- Short name: Bristol
- Founded: 2006
- Arena: Winterbourne Academy
- President: (Hungary) Balazs Musitz
- Head coach: (Denmark) Casper Føns
- League: EHA Premier League South and Regional South Leagues
Home	Away

Bristol Handball Club is an English handball club based in Bristol, England and founded in 2006 and playing in EHA's League and Cup competitions. The club is community-run, and has been volunteer-led for nearly two decades. Bristol Handball Club have welcomes new players at all levels of experience, with an emphasis on growing the sport in the United Kingdom.

They have a focus on community spirit, having worked with a number of local schools across the south-west, establishing a link between young peoples interested in pursuing development in the sport.

Outside of the sport, the club has a large focus on integrating largely European ex-pats, both students and working peoples be it for a year, or a number of them as a place to socialise and materialise with the local community of UK players they cater toward.

== Recent history ==
=== 2009/10 ===
Despite Bristol Handball not being in the top tier of English Handball the club upset Liverpool Handball Club in the 2009/10 EHA Cup in a low scoring 16–13 win against the top-tier side. Bristol Handball faced Manchester (one of the top three ranked teams in the country) in their quarter-final tie and lost narrowly 30–25.

=== 2011/12 ===
Bristol Handball Club lost out on promotion to England's top level in 2011/2012 at the final hurdle, losing out in the play-offs. This being their most successful season at that time.

=== 2015/16 ===
In 2015/16 Bristol Handball Club and local rivals Bath University thought closely for the league, however it was down to games between the two clubs that ended with Bath winning and Bristol finishing second in the SW Development League.

=== 2016/17 ===
A mixed season for the players of both men's and ladies teams in 2016/17, with the men finishing fourth in the South West Regional Development League and the ladies finishing fifth.

=== 2017/18 ===
The start of 2017/18 season saw a lot of player changes, with new players coming in and a number of the international students heading home. The league itself was also rebranded as the Regional League South West.

The men's team had an excellent year, registering their first victory over Bath University for a number of years and ending up as Champions with 5 more points than runners up and last year's champions South Wales. At the end of the season, Bristol played Chelsea at the Derby Arena for a place in the National League South. Bristol were victorious winning 36–32 to secure promotion.

The women's team recorded victories against every team in the league at least once during the season, with the exception of Reading, who finished as league champions and were promoted to the Premier Handball League. In the National Cup, Bristol reached the quarter-finals before being eliminated by London GD at the Copper Box Arena in London.

=== 2018/19 ===
Following promotion for the men's team in 2017/18, a second men's team was formed for the 2018/19 season. The team was named Bristol Spartans to highlight the link between Bristol Handball Club and Somerset Spartans whose youth teams feed into BHC's senior teams. The men's first team play in the EHA National League South, whereas Bristol Spartans continue BHC's representation in the EHA Regional League South West. The women's team continue to compete in the EHA Regional League South West.

During October 2018, Bristol were proud to support 17 year old BHC and Somerset Spartan player George Sawyer who represented Great Britain in Kosovo in the IHF Trophy where GB finished with the silver medal.

=== 2022/23 ===
With the restructure to the Men's league in 22/23, the rats saw themselves neck and neck in an exciting league run, losing the title to Oxford Handball club on goal difference, following two draws home and away. In the National Cup, they took on Islington Handball Club and Chelsea Handball Club, before eventually succumbing to winners to be, NEM Hawks.

Bristol Women's team looked to get more players into the team. New additions to the team made the team more competitive.

=== 2023/24 ===
The 23/24 season saw a struggling south-west area for teams, meaning that Bristol had to travel afar to continue playing the sport, with trips to Cambridge and central London.

For the men, they ultimately made the play-offs for the premier league by technicality, after an up and down season that saw some energetic play and determination. Ultimately, the loss to Chelsea Handball Club on the final play-off sealed their fate for another season in the UK's second division.

For the Women, it was a season where they had become competitive again, picking up a few wins with the addition of a number of further players. Ultimately it led to them finishing in mid-table, but it showed them the path that they were heading towards, being back towards their best as shown in the 2018–19 season.

=== 2025/26 ===
With the Men ascending to the Premier League for the first time in their history, they were given a stark reminder of the standard expected of them in a 31–17 defeat to long-time veterans London GD.

It also saw long time youth players Lola Fitzsimmons and Eliza Cutler be called up to the GB National team for the Under-20s and Under-18s at the IHF Tournament in Kosovo.

== Current men's squad 2025/2026 ==
NR.	NAME	NATIONALITY
2	Alvaro Osle	Spain
3	Philippe Chaumin	France
4	Stefano Santamaria	Italy
5	George Sawyer	England
6	Toby Smith	England
7	Balazs Musitz	Hungary
8	Julio Coelho	Portugal
9	Xavi Calvet	Spain
10	Balazs Zeles	England
11	Quentin Labry	France
13	Sam Turner	Scotland
14	Islam Henna	Spain
15	Adam Englert (GK)	Hungary
17	Martin B (GK)	France
18	Daniel Lillini	Italy
19	Sam Clawes	England
21	Ioannis Trakas	Greece
23	Charlie Hughes	England
24	Maxime Froc	France
25	Alejandro Manzaneda	Denmark
27	Piotr Lakomiec	Poland
31	Olegs Kadalevs	Latvia
33	Josh Hawkins	England
42	Thibault Couchoud	France
52	Alvin Pun	Hong Kong
57	Valeriu Serban	Romania
80	Casper Føns	Denmark
99	Victor Fernandes	Portugal

== Current ladies squad 2025/2026 ==
NR.	NAME	NATIONALITY
3	Marycarmen Flores Lopez	Venezuela
6	Ornella Cejas	Chile
9	Aniko Ehen	Hungary
10	Marta Rozynska	Poland
11	Lola Fitzsimmons (GK)	England
12	Dolly Whitburn	England
13	Pauline Paquet	France
18	Sarah Wynne	Wales
17	Giselle Tavener	England
21	Dorothy Fitzsimmons	France
21	Kat Lunding	Denmark
31	Anamaria Craiu	Romania
57	Andreea Serban	Romania
66	Myriam White	Belgium
71	Amelia Foster	England
99	Eliza Cutler	England

== Achievements ==
- EHA Men's Regional South West League
  - Winners: (1): 2017-18 Men's 1st Team
- EHA National League South Play Off
  - Winners: (1): 2017-18 Men's 1st Team
- EHA National League South
  - Winners: (1): 2024-25 Men's 1st Team
- EHA Premier League South Play Off
  - Winners: (1): 2024-25 Men's 1st Team
