= Leeds Carnegie =

Sports club in Leeds, England

- Based in: Carnegie School of Physical Education; Leeds
- Region: Yorkshire

Leeds Carnegie was a brand name used by several sports teams associated with the Carnegie School of Physical Education, now part of Leeds Beckett University. These include:

== Current ==
- Leeds Carnegie Handball Club

== Changed name ==
- Leeds Carnegie (basketball), now Leeds Force
- Leeds Carnegie (women's basketball), now Leeds Force (women)
- Leeds Carnegie (rugby union), now Leeds Tykes
- Leeds Carnegie L.F.C., now Leeds United Women F.C.

== Defunct ==
- Leeds Carnegie F.C.
- Leeds Carnegie (netball), later Yorkshire Jets
