= Islington Handball Club =

English Handball Club

- Full name: Islington Handball Club Community Interest Company
- Nickname(s): The Rats; The Ratitas
- Founded: 2012
- Arena: London Metropolitan University Science and Sports Centre; Holloway Road / London
- President: (Romania) Alexandra Geanina Văideanu
- Head coach: (France) Icham Benallal (Portugal) Anton Lammers
- League: Premier Handball League
- 2025-26: Runner-Ups
- Club colours

Islington Handball Club (IHC) is an amateur English handball club based in Islington, London, UK. The club fields men's, women's and youth's teams, and competes in South Division of the Premier Handball League, England Handball Association’s (EHA) top male and female competition.

The men’s team achieved promotion back to the first division in 2023, whilst the women’s team achieved promotion to the first division in 2024.

The club has more than 120 members representing around 20 different nationalities.

The motto of the club is ‘Join the Mischief’.

== History ==
The club was founded in 2012, but it was later incorporated as a Community Interest Company in 2017.

IHC started after an influx of interest in the sport due to the 2012 London Olympics. The club had initially three teams (one of each for men's, women's, and youth). The teams competed in EHA's regional leagues.

In 2017, the men's team reached the English Cup final and secured promotion to the top English Handball competition, the Handball Premier League. Due to administrative mistakes in registering players, the club was demoted to 3rd division at the end of the 2017 season.

Following this difficult event that nearly led to the club’s dissolution, the organisation underwent a comprehensive rebuilding process and in 2018 Yannick Argac was appointed as president. During this period, the club officially adopted the nickname “The Rats”, marking the beginning of its redevelopment. In 2019, Alexandra Vaideanu was elected president and has remained in the position since. Since its restructuring, Islington Handball Club has grown to become one of the largest handball clubs in England. The club fields five senior teams in addition to a number of youth teams. Its men’s and women’s first teams compete in England Handball Premier League. The club has enjoyed considerable competitive success in recent years. In the 2025–26 season, the men’s first team finished as runners-up in the England Handball Premier League after losing to Olympia Handball Club in the championship final. The club subsequently qualified for the British Super Cup, where it finished third overall in Great Britain. This result also secured qualification for the EHF European Cup, marking the club’s first participation in a European competition.

In the 2026-2027 EHF European Cup, Islington Men 1 team faced PLER-Budapest one of Hungary's top professional team, in the second round in Budapest. The team gained valuable experience at the European level and competed against one of the stronger clubs in the tournament.

PLER-Budapest won the first game 49-20 and secured another win in the second tie 39-15. Although the score difference was significant, the team played two strong games and managed to challenge the professional side in both matches.

This fixture represented a key milestone for the club's development, providing its first exposure to European professional handball and allowing players, staff, the club and fans to experience the highest level of the sport.

== Teams ==
IHC currently fields five teams in EHA competitions:

Three men's teams:

- Team 1, competing in the EHA Premier League (South) & EHF European Cup (round 2 2026-2027)
- Team 2, competing in the EHA Regional League South 1. The team acts as a development base for potential Team 1 players.
- Team 3, competing in the EHA Regional League South 2 (East). The team is open to players of any skill-level.

Two women's teams:

- Team 1, competing in the EHA Premier League (South).
- Team 2, competing in the EHA Regional League South. The team acts both as a development base for potential Team 1 players, and an all-skill-level team.

A youth team, aiming to introduce children under 18 to the game, is also part of the club.

== Men’s Team ==
=== Team 1 ===
Coach: (France) Icham Benallal

Goalkeepers

- (France) M. Garriga
- (France) C. Baudot
- (France) Y. Argac (Captain)

Right wingers

- (Lithuania) M. Treinys
- (Portugal) L. Lopes Correia Da Silva

Left wingers

- (Portugal) J. Da Silva Carvalho

Line players

- (Algeria) M. Toumi
- (France) T. Vercruysse

Left backs

- (France) T. Accogli
- (Algeria) Y. Mallek
- (France) V. Doucet

Centre backs

- (Romania) A. Gug
- (Brazil) L. De Matos Figueredo
- (France) H. Benallal

Right backs

- (Germany) A. Rauner
- (Spain) D. Damian Shackleford
- (France) T. Pontaut
- (Germany) S. Georg Rilling

=== Team 2 ===
Coach: (Germany) Renard Teipelke

Goalkeepers

- (United Kingdom) K. Sembian
- (Israel) R. Reshef
- (Brazil) T. R. A. D. Valle

Right wingers

- (North Macedonia) B. Nocheski
- (Portugal) B. Esteves

Left wingers

- (Portugal) J. D. S. Carvalho
- (United Kingdom) S. Coates

Line players

- (Romania) A. A. Plesca
- (Greece) C. Makris

Left backs

- (United Kingdom) O. Castaigne
- (France) R. Adeyemo
- (France) V. Doucet

Centre backs

- (United Kingdom) A. Adams
- (United Kingdom) H. Kennard
- (Brazil) L. D. M. Figueredo

Right backs

- (Spain) D. D. Shackleford
- (Germany) F. Schlobach
- (Singapore) L. Tong
- (Germany) H. Buehler

=== Team 3 ===
Coach: (Romania) Alexandra Văideanu

Goalkeepers

- (United Kingdom) T. Haines
- (United Kingdom) A. Rowe
- (Romania) C.-E. Schverin

Right wingers

- (Portugal) B. Esteves
- (Spain) S. R. Martinez

Left wingers

- (Malaysia) Z. Xiao

Line players

- (Israel) U. Enzel
- (Uruguay) M. Fairless

Left backs

- (France) B. Billard
- (Ukraine) Y. Yukhymenko

Centre backs

- (Germany) R. Teipelke
- (Croatia) G. P. Maretic
- (United Kingdom) J. Foex

Right backs

- (Nigeria) J. Obodai
- (United Kingdom) T. Marshall
- (Singapore) K. Y. O. Fung

== Women’s Team ==
=== Team 1 ===
Coach: (Portugal) Anton Lammers

Goalkeepers

- (France) E. Fourneau

Right wingers

- (France) C. Boudreault

Left wingers

- (Spain) A. T. Escriche
- (Cyprus) I. Avraamidou

Line players

- (France) J. Andres
- (Cyprus) A. Tzagia

Left backs

- (France) A. Jargoyhen
- (Brazil) E. S. Rivada

Centre backs

- (France) S. Derussy
- (France) E. L. Kowalski

Right backs

- (France) M. G. Engoue

=== Team 2 ===
Coach: (Portugal) Anton Lammers

Goalkeepers

- (France) E. Fourneau

Right wingers

- (Brazil) G. F. Alencar
- (Spain) R. Simmonds

Left wingers

- (Spain) A. T. Escriche
- (Greece) A. Sarasiti

Line players

- (United Kingdom) A. Tshimbalang
- (United Kingdom) M. Downey
- (Norway) S. M. Inayat

Left backs

- (Italy) M. E. Bagnulo
- (Germany) C. M. Withag

Centre backs

- (Romania) A. G. Vaideanu
- (Romania) C. Filimon

Right backs

- (France) M. G. Engoue
- (Brazil) G. G. Granchi

== Youth Team ==
In accordance with the EHA’s national guidelines and in the spirit of the game, Islington HC has re-established its youth team in 2022.

== Achievements ==
=== Men’s Team 1 ===
- British Handball Super Cup
  - 3rd: (1): 2025-26
- EHA Men's Premier League
  - Runners-Up: (1): 2025-26
- EHA Men's Premier League South
  - 2rd: (1): 2025-26
  - 3rd: (2): 2023-24 2024-25
- EHA Men's Premier League Play Off
  - Winners: (2): 2016-17 2022-23
- EHA Men's National Cup
  - Runners-Up: (1): 2016-17
  - Semi-Finalists: (1): 2018-19

=== Men’s Team 2 ===
- EHA Men's Regional League South 1
  - 2nd: (1): 2023-24
  - 3rd: (1): 2024-25

=== Men’s Team 3 ===
- EHA Men's Regional League South 2 East
  - 3rd: (2): 2023-24 2024-25

=== Women’s Team 1 ===
- EHA Women's Premier League South
  - 5th: (1): 2024-25
- EHA Women's Regional League South
  - Runners-Up: (1): 2023-24
- EHA Women's Premier League Play Off
  - Runners-Up: (1): 2023-24

=== Women’s Team 2 ===
- EHA Women's Regional League South
  - 5th: (1): 2024-25
