= Coventry handball club =

English handball club

Coventry Sharks Handball Club
- Nickname(s): Sharks
- Short name: Coventry Sharks
- Founded: 2012
- Arena: Coventry Sports & Leisure Centre
- Capacity: TBC
- President: (Poland) Lukasz Rusiecki
- Club colours
Home	Away

Coventry Sharks Handball Club was formed in the aftermath of the 2012 Summer Olympics by Paul Cross and Colin Littlewood. The club has teams in men's and women's EHA Super-8, the men's team promoted from the Championship in 2016. The women's team reached the final of the England Handball National Cup in 2015 and 2016, only to lose to London GD and Olympia, respectively.

There had in fact previously been a handball club existing with the same name, playing at the same venue in Coventry, but it had disbanded in 1983.

== About the club ==
In its first year, the club had two men’s teams and a ladies team competing in the top league in the Midlands as well as in their respective national cups.

Men’s and women’s first teams finished 2nd in their respective leagues, earning them the right to compete in the national play-offs. The men took this opportunity with both hands, defeating Manchester Uni 21—15 to earn themselves a place in the top national league, the EHA Super 8 for the 2014/15 season.

The men’s second team made their debut in Midlands League 1, finishing 5th, as well as finishing 3rd in the Southern League Cup.

As well as finishing 2nd in their league, the women also made it to the final of the EHA League Cup, where they faced London Angels in the 2013/2014 season.

In 2014/15, Coventry Academy was formed. In the same season the U16 girls entered the national competition and played their semi-final in Wolverhampton, coming second, later being chosen to play in the finals. Overall, they came third, only being beaten by Olympia Cannock and Chester. In the same season, the women beat London Angels in the semi-final of the EHA League Cup, after two periods of extra time. Following their victory, the club travelled to the Copper Box Arena in London on 16 May 2015, to support the Women's team in the final of the cup. After one period of extra time the women were defeated by London GD however had the offer to play in the European Cup, which they had to decline. By the end of the 2014/2015 season, due to their performance the team got promoted to the top English league, the Super 8, which the men had to step down from in the same season.

== Coventry Sharks Handball Club Teams ==
=== Coventry Sharks Men's First Team ===
Originally known as Coventry Sharkbite HC, the handball Club's First Men's Team was named after the Primary Sponsor Sharkbite Plumbing Solutions, which later gave the entire club the name: Coventry Sharks. The team played its first competitive season in the 2013/14, cteamting in the Midlands regional league 1, the second Tier on the English Handball pyramid. The club finished 2nd and then won promotion to the EHA Super 8 through the national playoffs overcoming University of Manchester 21-15 in London. The team later decided to step down from the Super 8 for the 2015/2016 season, following a vast number of injuries in the previous season, and are now working towards promotion once again.

=== Coventry Sharks Women's First Team ===
The Team coached by Przemysław Bednarczyk played its first competitive season in the 2013/14, competing in the Midlands regional League, the second tier of the English Handball Pyramid. The Club Finished 2nd in the League and competed in the playoffs for promotion to the Women's Super 8. Following their performance in the 2014/15 season, the women have been promoted to the Super 8.
