= Northfield School & Sports College =

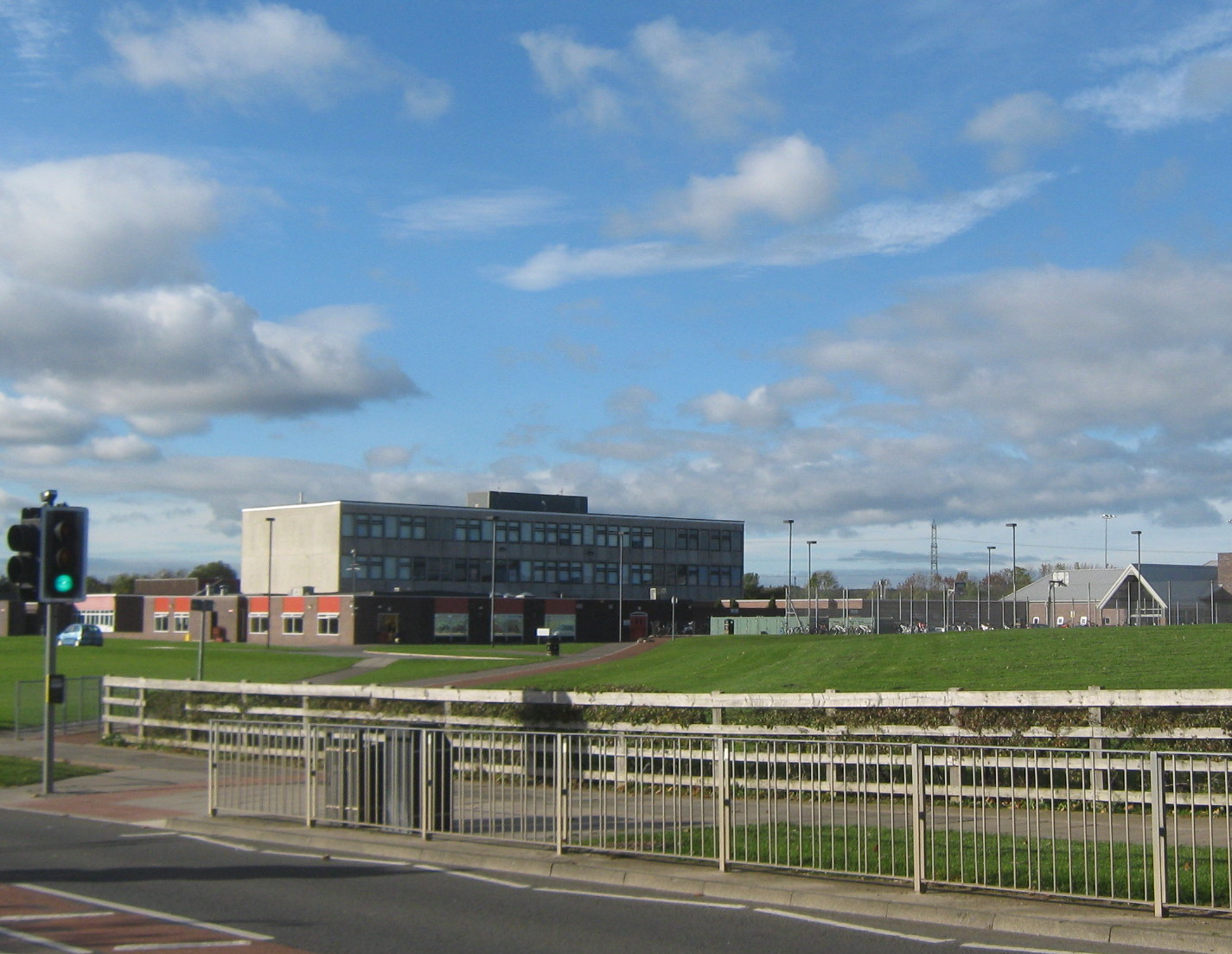
- The school's south east corner

Location
- Thames Road; Billingham, County Durham, TS22 5EG; England
- Coordinates: 54.61717°N 1.31058°W

Information
- Type: Community school
- Motto: Many minds, one heart
- Local authority: Stockton-on-Tees
- Department for Education URN: 111731 Tables
- Ofsted: Reports
- Head Teacher: Richard Henderson
- Gender: Coeducational
- Age: 11 to 16
- Website: http://northfieldssc.org

Northfield School & Sports College is a comprehensive secondary school in Billingham, north-east England.

== History ==
The school was established in 1972. It was awarded specialist Sports College status in 1999, and in 2008 was awarded a second specialism as a Training School. The first headteacher, Dennis Armitage was succeeded in 1989 by David Youldon and in 2010 by Craig Walker. In 2009/2010 it merged with Billingham Campus School, with both named Northfield School. In December 2018, Richard Henderson took over as headteacher.

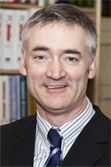
Craig Walker, Head Teacher of Northfield School

== Notable former pupils ==
- Jamie Bell, actor famous for the role of Billy Elliot, and Griffin in the film Jumper
- Eleanor Dale, footballer
- Andrew Davies, former professional footballer whose former clubs include Middlesbrough, Southampton and Bradford City
- Mark Davies, former Durham County and England Lions cricket player
- Tommy Mooney, former professional footballer who played in the Premier League for Watford
- Richard Kilty, world indoor 60m champion and European indoor champion sprinter
- Zooey Perry, Premier League Handball player currently playing in Oslo, Norway
- Daniel Rowe, footballer who both attended and worked for the school
- Paul Smith, the frontman of Indie group Maxïmo Park
- Brad Walker, professional footballer with over 300 professional appearances
