= Copper Box Arena =

Indoor multi-sport venue in London, England

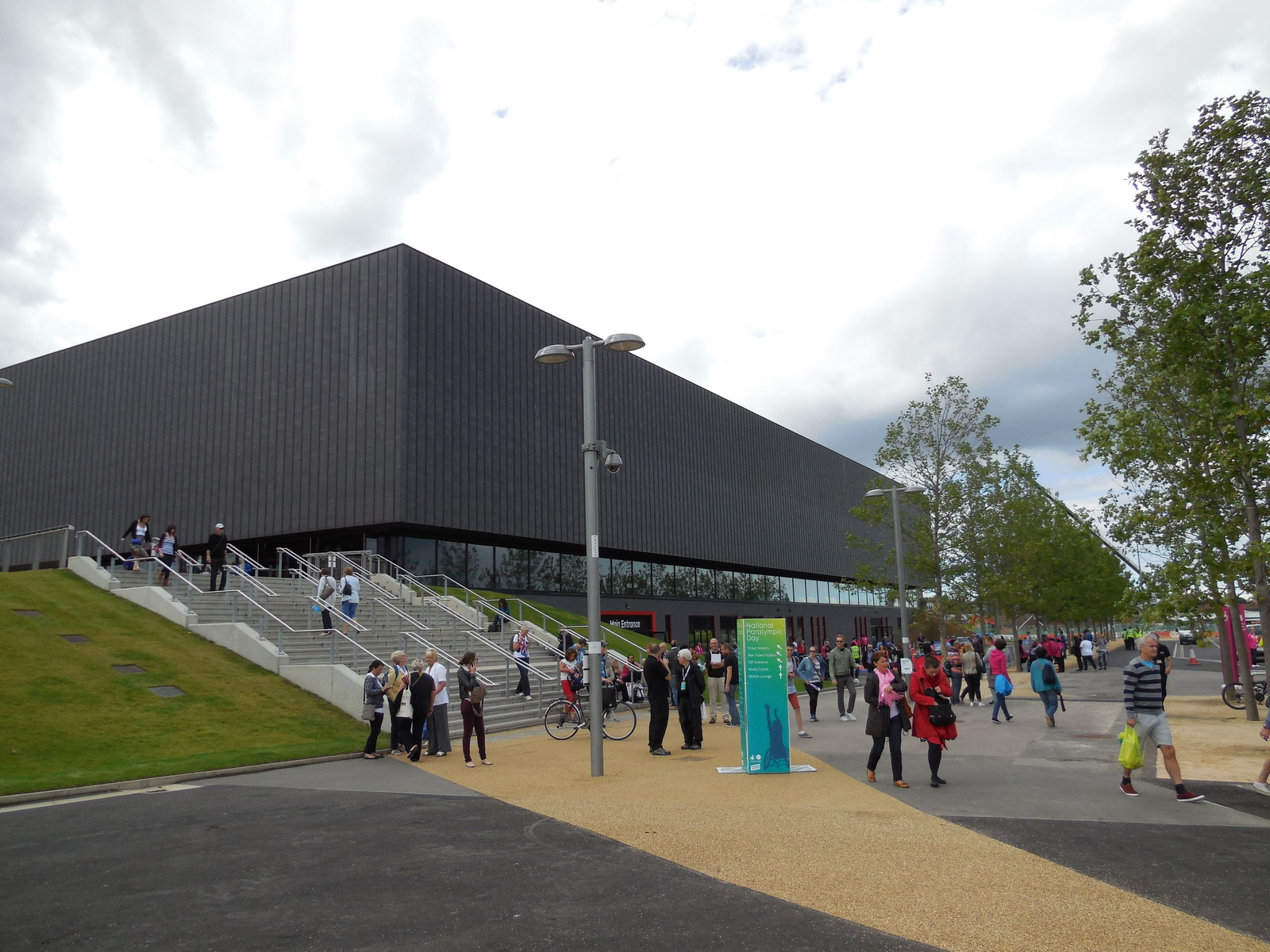
- The Copper Box Arena in September 2013
- Interactive map of Copper Box Arena
- Former names: Handball Arena (2011–12)
- Location: Hackney Wick, London
- Coordinates: 51°32′40″N 0°1′12″W
- Owner: London Legacy Development Corporation
- Operator: Greenwich Leisure Limited
- Capacity: Concerts: 7,481; Basketball: 6,000
- Public transit: Stratford; Stratford International; Hackney Wick

Construction
- Groundbreaking: October 2009
- Built: 2009–11
- Opened: May 2011
- Cost: £44 million (£70.2 million in 2024 sterling)
- Architects: Make Architects, Populous, PTW Architects, ARUP

Tenants
- London Lions (BBL) (2013–present); London Lions Women (WBBL) (2017–present); London GD Handball Club (EHA) (2013–present); London Pulse (EN/NS) (2018–present); London Royal Ravens (CODL) (2020–2023)

The Copper Box Arena is a multi-sport venue built for the 2012 Summer Olympics, located in the Queen Elizabeth Olympic Park in London, England.

Previously known as the Handball Arena, it was renamed because, aside from handball, it hosted modern pentathlon (fencing, shooting, swimming, horse jumping and running) during the Olympics and was the goalball venue for the 2012 Summer Paralympics.

== History ==
London's Olympic bid proposed that there would be four indoor arenas in the Olympic Park, in addition to other main venues, but the revised masterplan published in 2006 reduced this to three, with the volleyball being moved to Earls Court Exhibition Centre. The fencing arena was also cancelled, and the fencing took place at ExCeL. Construction of the building was completed on time in early 2011 and came in under budget. The design incorporates light pipes and rainwater collectors to reduce both energy and water use by 40%. Test events were successfully hosted at the venue ahead of the Olympic and Paralympic Games in 2012.

In January 2012, the venue was renamed the Copper Box from the Handball Arena, thus reflecting the look of the building and the fact that it would not just be used for Handball. British Handball campaigned for the rebrand to be reversed.

== Olympics ==
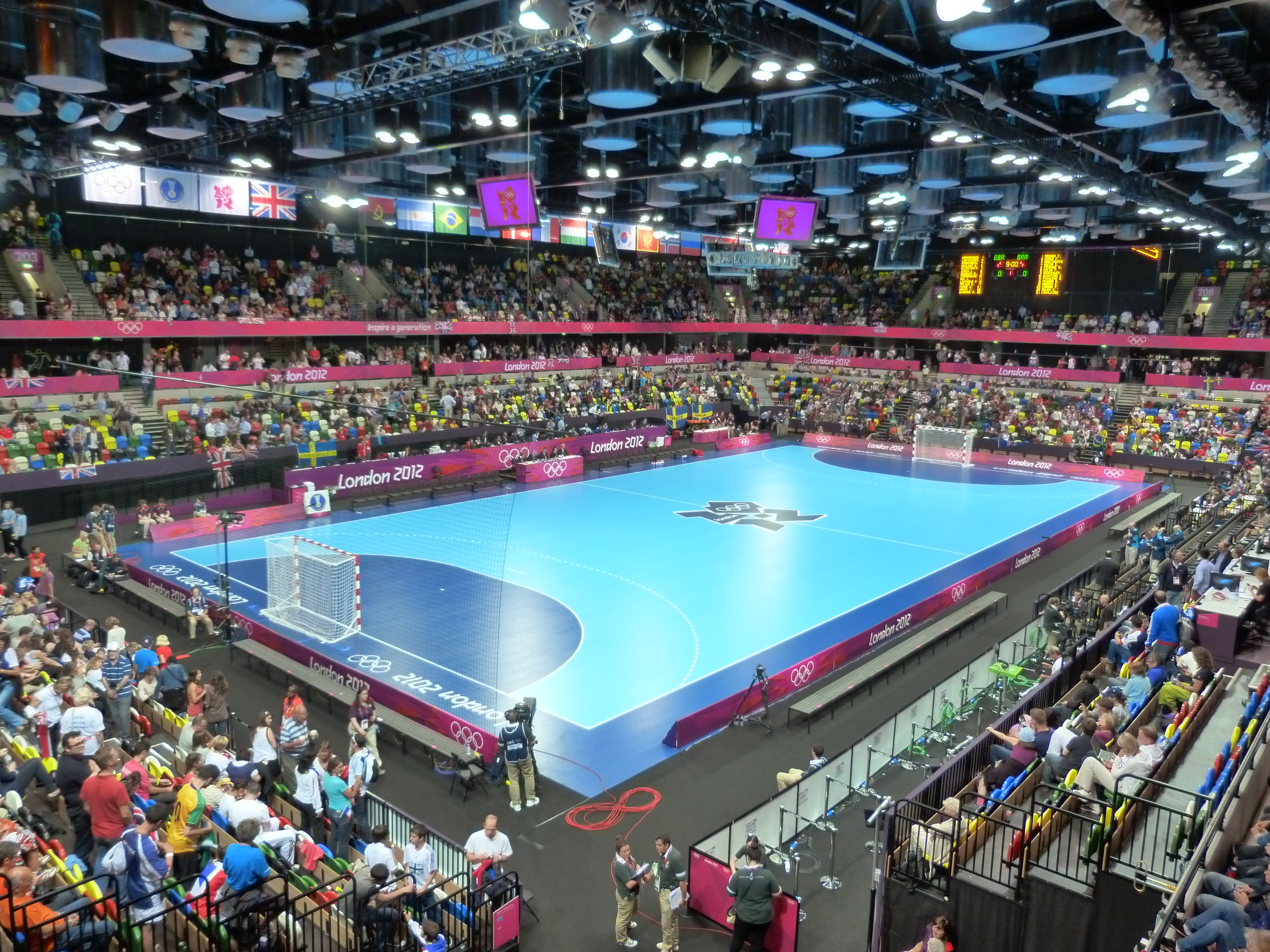
The Copper Box interior before a handball game

The Copper Box has 7,000 seats. It was used for handball preliminaries and modern pentathlon fencing during the Olympic Games, and for goalball during the Paralympic Games. The handball men's quarter-finals, all semi-finals and both finals were held at the larger Basketball Arena.

The Copper Box was praised for its loud, exciting atmosphere during handball games. For the Paralympics goalball events the crowd in the Box were required to be quiet.

== Post-Olympics ==
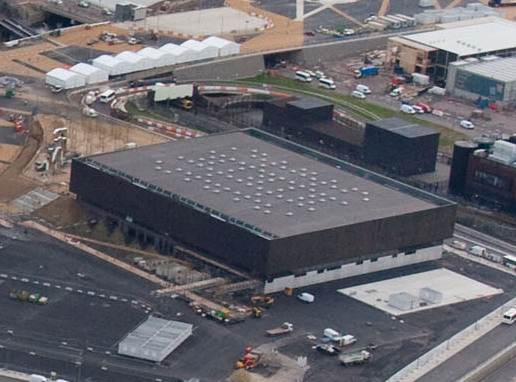
Aerial view of the building in 2012

The venue has been adapted into a multi-sport arena for community use, athlete training and major events.

British Basketball League side London Lions relocated to the Copper Box for the 2013–14 season. They played their first game there on 14 August 2013 in front of a sell-out crowd, losing 72–107 to the Iowa Hawkeyes American college basketball team in an exhibition match. The Lions' women's team, playing in the WBBL, moved to the venue in 2017.

The venue played host to the 2015 Netball Superleague Grand Final, which saw the Surrey Storm win their first Netball Superleague title, defeating the Hertfordshire Mavericks, 56–39. The venue is the home arena for the London Pulse, who since 2018 have played in the Superleague. It has also hosted several home test matches for the England national team.

The Copper Box hosted the London Grand Prix badminton tournament on 1–6 October 2013. The London Grand Prix forms part of the Badminton World Federation's Grand Prix Gold series.

The Wheelchair Rugby event at the 2014 Invictus Games was held at the venue in September 2014, as was the BT World Wheelchair Rugby Challenge in October 2015.

London GD Handball Club, one of the oldest handball clubs in the country, used the venue for its home matches.

The floor was badly damaged during a mass fitness event in January 2014, resulting in several netball internationals having to be played elsewhere at the last minute.

Counter-Strike: Global Offensive and Super Smash Bros. Melee DreamHack London 2015 took place at the Copper Box on 19–20 September.

On 3 February 2018, the Copper Box hosted the amateur boxing fight between YouTubers KSI and Joe Weller. It has also hosted IBF boxing.

From 22 to 25 February 2018, the venue played host to the ITTF Team World Cup table tennis competition.

The Rocket League Championship Series Season 5 World Championship, an Esports event sponsored by Psyonix, the video game company who created Rocket League, was hosted there on 8–10 June 2018. The event was notable for "The Shot", in which Justin "jstn." Morales, a player on NRG, scored a last-second goal that forced overtime in game 7 of the World Championship Grand Final Bracket Reset. The RLCS would return to the Copper Box for the 2021–2022 season Spring Major on 29 June–3 July 2022, with crowds only being present on the final two days. Moist Esports won that Major's Grand Final 4–3 in series 1 and 4–0 in the Bracket Reset against Team Falcons. In 2024, the RLCS would return to the Copper Box for a third time at the London Major on 20–23 June 2024, with crowd only being present on the final two days again. G2 Stride won that Major’s Grand Final 4–1, also against Team Falcons. The RLCS will come back to the Copper Box for a record fourth time for the RLCS Club Championship Kick-off on 9–13 December 2026.

Great Britain played Kazakhstan at the arena in April 2019, in the tennis Fed Cup World Group II play-offs.

On 31 August 2019, the venue was used for New Japan Pro-Wrestling's show in the United Kingdom, Royal Quest. NJPW returned to the Copper Box for Royal Quest III on 13 October 2023.

From 14 to 16 November 2019 the venue hosted X0, an annual event presented by Xbox.

Between January and July 2020, the Copper Box Arena was used as the home venue for the London Royal Ravens, an eSports team taking part in the inaugural Call of Duty League.

The Apex Legends Global Series Year 3 Split 1 finals, was hosted there on 2-5 Feb 2023.

The arena was one of the three venues selected to host matches in the 2021 Wheelchair Rugby League World Cup.

The arena hosted the League of Legends MSI 2023 tournament between 2-21 May 2023.

Revolution Pro Wrestling (Otherwise known as RevPro) hosted their 11th and 12th anniversary shows at the venue on 26 August 2023 and 24 August 2024, each one day before All Elite Wrestling's All In 2023 and 2024 events at Wembley Stadium.

In November 2023, the arena was used for the 2023 Billie Jean King Cup play-offs between Great Britain and Sweden, which determine which team is relegated below the qualifying rounds in 2024.

On 24 March 2025, the arena hosted the UK's inaugural Baller League fixture.

Beginning in August 2025 the arena hosted the London residency for the band Gorillaz.

From June 6-21st 2026 Valorant Masters London, a tier 1 Valorant tournament, was hosted at the arena.
