= Cambridge University Handball Club =

English handball club

Cambridge University HC
- Full name: Cambridge University Handball Club
- Short name: CUHC
- Founded: 2013
- Arena: University of Cambridge Sports Centre
- President: Christoph Franck
- Captain: Anna Richardson; Sebastian Horstmann
- League: University Championships
- Club colours
Home	Away

Cambridge University Handball Club (CUHC) was founded and registered as a club at the University of Cambridge in 2013. CUHC runs competitive men’s and women's teams playing in national competitions. It is a member of the England Handball Association and the Association of British University Handball Clubs. Both the men's and the women's teams are currently holding their Varisity Trophy against Oxford (2020).

== Squad ==
=== Men's team ===
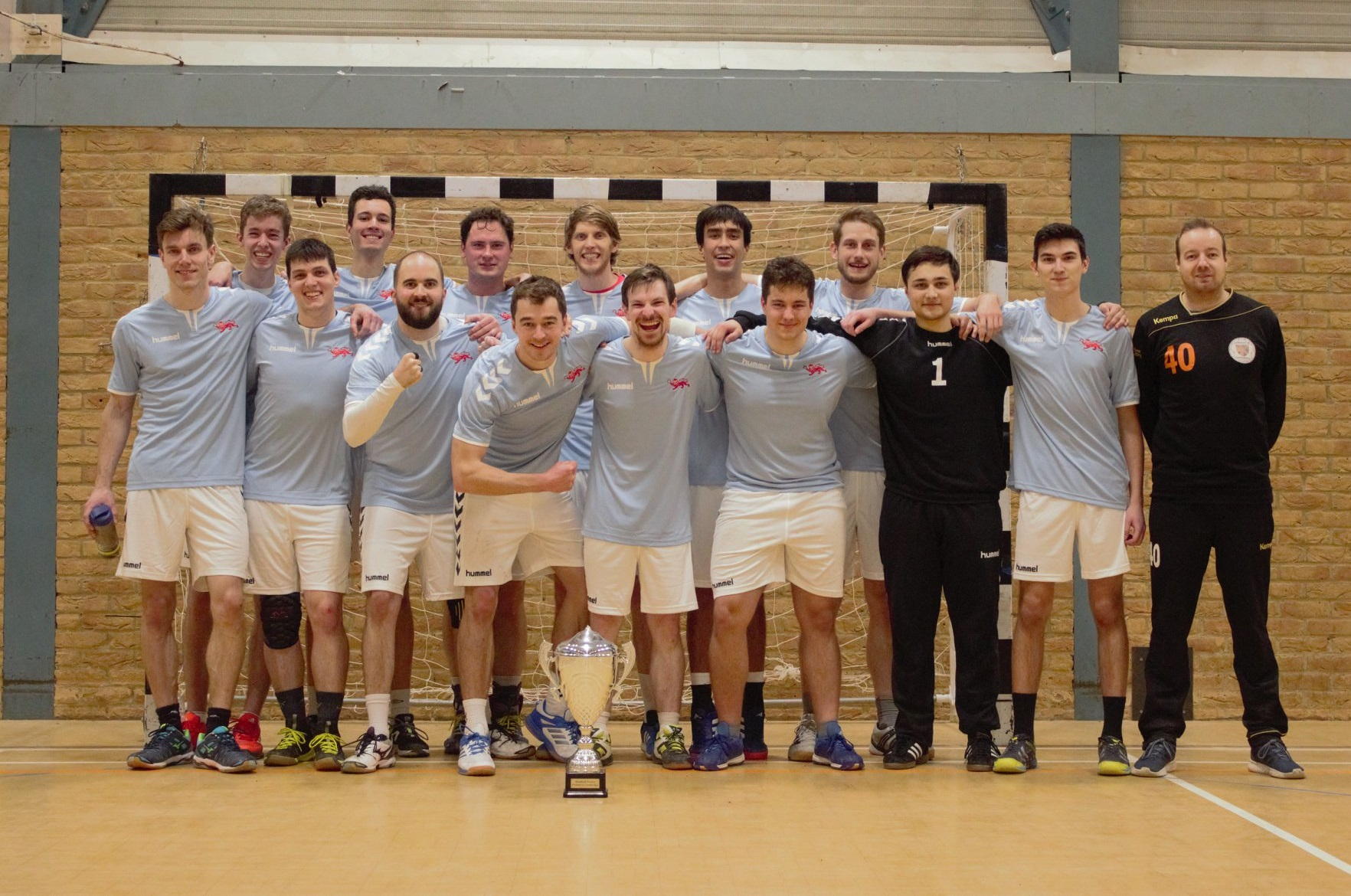
CUHC Men's 2018/19

=== Women's team ===
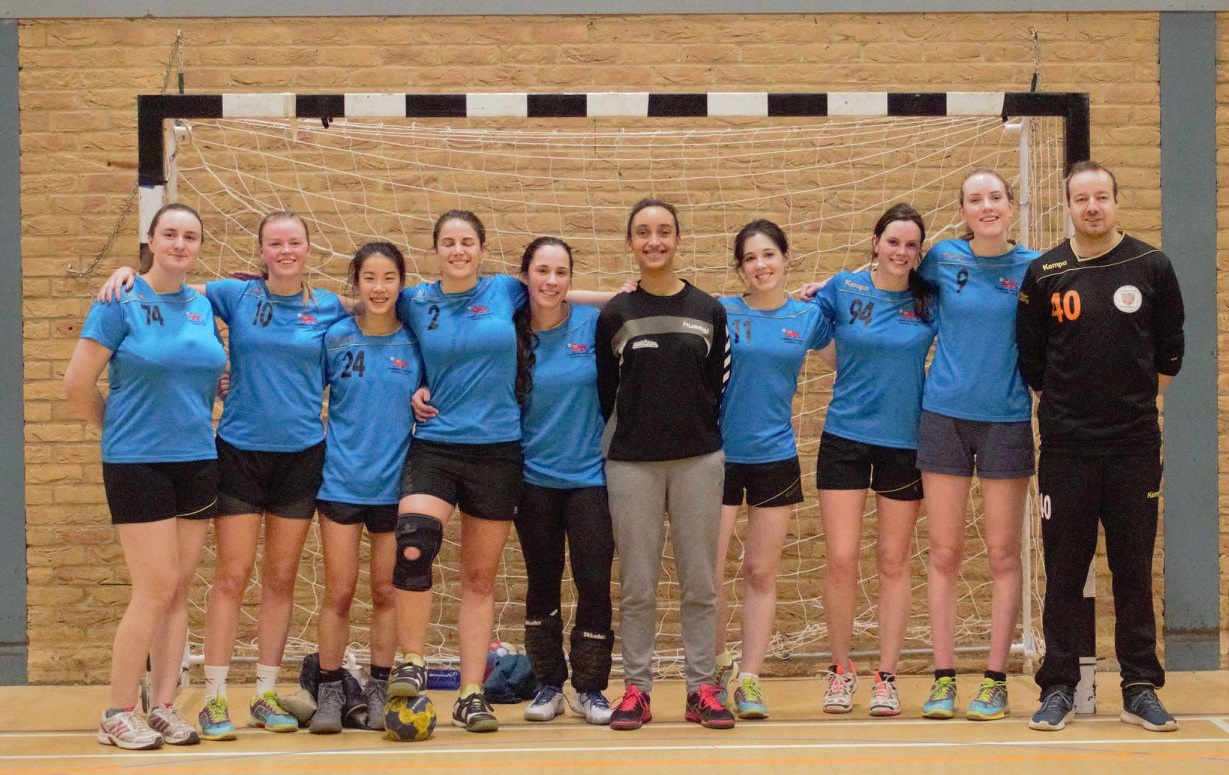
CUHC Women's 2018/19

== Competitions ==
=== British University Championships ===
The club has been taking part in the British University Championships. The men's team participated in the 2013/14 season (5th place), 2014/15 season (1st place, British University Champions) and 2015/16 season. The women's team played for the first time in the 2014/15 season (3rd place in plate finals) and continued in the 2015/16 season (1st place in plate finals).

Men's team
Year	Round	Position	P	W	D	L	GF	GA
2014	National Cup (Quarter final)	5^{th} place						
2015	National Cup (Final)	1^{st} place	7	7	0	0	86	51
2016	National Cup							
2017	National Cup							
2018	National Cup							
2019	National Cup	Round of 16	10	7	2	1		
2020	National Cup	4th place	6	3	0	3		

Women's team
Year	Round	Position	P	W	D	L	GF	GA
2014	Did not enter							
2015	National Cup (Plate)	3^{rd} place						
2016	National Cup (Plate)	1^{st} place						
2017	National Cup							
2018	National Cup							
2019	National Cup							
2020	National Cup	5th place						

=== Varsity ===
The first season of existence of the club saw the inaugural Handball Varsity match, which took place on 25 January 2014 at SportHouse in London.

25 January 2014	CUHC Men's	26–32	OUHaC Men's	(report)

CUHC Women's	23–12	OUHaC Women's

31 January 2015	CUHC Men's	24–31	OUHaC Men's	(report)

CUHC Women's	21–31	OUHaC Women's

14 February 2016	OUHaC Men's	19–27	CUHC Men's	(report)

OUHaC Women's	31–14	CUHC Women's

5 March 2017	CUHC Men's	38–26	OUHaC Men's	(report)

CUHC Women's	21–27	OUHaC Women's

27 January 2018	OUHaC Men's	29–31	CUHC Men's

OUHaC Women's	16–14	CUHC Women's

3 February 2019	OUHaC Men's	8–23	CUHC Men's

OUHaC Women's	25–15	CUHC Women's

23 February 2020	CUHC Men's	32–26 (16–12)	OUHaC Men's

CUHC Women's	23–21 (15–7)	OUHaC Women's

In 2020, the Cambridge Men's team won the Varsity match in the fifth subsequent year. At the same time, the Cambridge Women's team reclaimed the trophy for the first time since five years from Oxford's Women who had been unbeaten in Varsity since 2015.
