= EHF coefficient rank =

Ranking of European handball teams

In European handball, the EHF coefficient rank is a ranking of national leagues produced by the European Handball Federation, used to assign clubs into European competitions. The ranking is determined by the club results over the previous three seasons in the EHF Champions League (CL), EHF European League (EL), EHF European Cup (EC), and historically the (now-defunct) EHF Cup Winners' Cup (CWC). Each competition coefficient is calculated independently, and has no impact on team seeding, which is determined separately. The separation of competition rankings was first announced in September 2022 as a way to more fairly reflect federation performance, having previously combined all competition coefficients together.

== League Coefficient in the 2021/22 season for Men ==
Indicates countries which have received their coefficient points from participation in EHF European Cup.

As of 2021–22 season

Ranking			League	Coeff.	Places in 2021–22 season			
2021/22	Mvmt.	2020/21	League	Coeff.	CL	EL	EC	Total
1	▲ +1	2	(Germany) Liqui Moly Bundesliga	133.67	1	4	0	5
2	▼ -1	1	(France) Liqui Moly Starligue	132.83	1	4	0	5
3	▲ +2	5	(Spain) Liga Sacyr ASOBAL	95.83	1	3	0	4
4	–	2	(Hungary) Nemzeti Bajnokság I	94.83	1	3	0	4
5	▼ -2	3	(North Macedonia) Super Liga	93.00	1	3	0	4
6	—	6	(Poland) PGNiG Superliga	77.00	1	3	0	4
7	—	7	(Denmark) Håndboldligaen	74.50	1	3	0	4
8	▲ +1	9	(Portugal) Placard Andebol 1	69.00	1	3	0	4
9	▼ -1	8	(Croatia) Paket24 Premijer liga	46.33	1	3	0	4
10	▲ +3	13	(Romania) Liga Națională	44.67	0	2	2	4
11	▼ -1	10	(Belarus) Chempiyanat 1	43.83	0	2	2	4
12	▲ +2	14	(Slovenia) NLB liga	41.67	0	2	2	4
13	▼ -1	12	(Sweden) Handbollsligan	38.33	0	2	2	4
14	▼ -3	11	(Ukraine) Superleague	34.17	0	2	2	4
15	—	15	(Switzerland) Quickline Handball League	30.67	0	2	2	4
16	–	16	(Norway) REMA 1000-ligaen	29.50	0	2	2	4
17	▲ +1	18	(Slovakia) Niké Handball Extraliga	21.33	0	2	2	4
18	▼ -1	17	(Russia) Superleague	21.33	0	2	2	4
19	–	19	(Finland) SM-liiga	19.67	0	1	3	4
20	▲ +2	22	(Austria) ZTE Meisterliga	15.20	0	1	3	4
21	▼ -1	20	(Turkey) Süper Ligi	14.00	0	1	3	4
22	▲ +2	24	(Belgium) Eerste Klasse/Division 1	9.33	0	1	3	4
23	▲ +4	27	(Czech Republic) Extraliga	9.17	0	1	3	4
24	▼ -1	23	(Iceland) Olís deildin	9.00	0	1	3	4
24	▼ -3	21	(Israel) Ligat Winner	9.00	0	1	3	4
26	▲ +2	28	(Greece) Handball Premier	8.80	0	1	3	4
27	▲ +2	29	(Serbia) Arkus Liga	7.17	0	1	3	4
28	▼ -3	25	(Luxembourg) Axa League	6.33	0	1	3	4
29	▼ -3	26	(Netherlands) Lotto Eredivisie	6.20	0	1	3	4
30	▼ –1	29	(Kosovo) Superliga	5.33	0	1	3	4
1	—	1	(Bosnia and Herzegovina) Premijer liga BiH	18.33	0	0	3	3
2	▲ +1	3	(Lithuania) Rankinio Lyga	10.67	0	0	3	3
3	▼ -1	2	(Bulgaria) GHR A	5.67	0	0	3	3
4	▲ +1	5	(United Kingdom) Premier League	5.33	0	0	3	3
5	—	5	(Cyprus) A1 Andrón	5.00	0	0	3	3
6	▲ +4	10	(Latvia) SynotTip Virsliga	4.00	0	0	3	3
7	—	7	(Moldova) Divizia Națională	3.67	0	0	3	3
8	—	8	(Italy) Serie A	3.33	0	0	3	3
8	▼ -4	4	(Montenegro) Prva Liga	3.33	0	0	3	3
10	▼ -1	8	(Georgia (country)) 1st League	3.00	0	0	3	3
11	▲ +3	14	(Faroe Islands) Faroese Handball League	1.00	0	0	3	3
12	▼ -1	11	(Azerbaijan) Premier Handball League	0.67	0	0	3	3
12	▼ -1	11	(Estonia) Meistriliiga	0.67	0	0	3	3
14	▼ -3	11	(Malta) 1st Division	0.33	0	0	3	3
15	▼ -1	14	ALB, AND, ARM, IRL, LIE, MON	0.00	0	0	3	3

=== Historical rankings ===
Country	21/22	20/21	19/20	18/19	17/18	16/17	15/16	14/15	13/14	12/13	11/12	10/11	09/10	08/09	07/08	06/07	05/06	04/05
(France) FRA	2	1	1	4	4	4	3	3	3	3	4	5	5	3	4	4	6	7
(Germany) GER	1	2	2	1	1	1	1	1	1	1	1	1	1	2	2	2	2	2
(Spain) ESP	3	5	3	2	3	2	2	2	2	2	2	2	2	1	1	1	1	1
(Hungary) HUN	4	4	4	3	2	3	4	6	7	5	3	4	4	6	5	5	4	3
(Poland) POL	6	6	5	5	5	6	7	11	14	16	16	14	12	15	14	15	13	14
(Denmark) DEN	7	7	6	6	6	5	5	4	4	7	6	3	3	4	7	6	5	6
(North Macedonia) MKD	5	3	7	7	8	8	8	10	13	12	15	13	17	14	17	16	15	13
(Portugal) POR	8	9	8	9	10	13	14	15	11	11	12	18	15	18	16	22	19	12
(Croatia) CRO	9	8	10	8	9	11	13	9	9	10	10	10	10	8	8	8	8	5
(Belarus) BLR	11	10	9	12	15	14	10	12	19	25	24	25	25	29	27	?	?	?

== League Coefficient in the 2026/27 season for Women ==
Indicates countries guaranteed minimum 1 place in the Women's EHF Champions League.
Indicates countries with opportunities for qualification in the Women's EHF Champions League.
Indicates countries with limited or none opportunities for qualification in the Women's EHF Champions League.

=== Women's EHF Champions League ===
As of 2026–27 season.

Ranking			League	Coeff.	Places in 2026-27 season
2026/27	Mvmt.	2025/26	League	Coeff.	Places in 2026-27 season
1	b	1	(Hungary) Nemzeti Bajnokság I	227.67	1
2	▲ +1	3	(Denmark) Bambuni Kvindeligaen	169.00	1
3	▲ +1	4	(France) Ligue Butagaz Énergie	145,33	1
4	▼ -2	2	(Norway) REMA 1000-ligaen	142,33	1
5	Steady	5	(Romania) Liga Națională	114.33	1
6	▲+1	7	(Germany) Handball-Bundesliga Frauen	110.67	1
7	▲ +1	8	(Slovenia) 1. A DRL	78,00	1
8	▲ +4	12	(Croatia) 1. HRL	52.00	1
9	Steady	9	(Montenegro) Prva Liga	46.33	1
10	▲ +1	11	(Turkey) Süper Ligi	29.00	0
11	▼ –1	10	(Sweden) Handbollsligan	26.00	0
11	▲ +1	13	(Poland) PGNiG Superliga	26.00	0
11	▲ +3	14	(Czech Republic) Extraliga	26.00	0

=== Women's EHF European League ===
As of 2026–27 season.

Ranking			League	Coeff.	Places in 2026-27 season
2026/27	Mvmt.	2025/26	League	Coeff.	Places in 2026-27 season
1	Steady	1	(Denmark) Bambuni Kvindeligaen	94,67	4
2	Steady	2	(Germany) Handball-Bundesliga Frauen	92.67	4
3	Steady	3	(Norway) REMA 1000-ligaen	78.33	3
4	Steady	4	(Romania) Liga Națională	75.67	3
5	b	5	(France) Ligue Butagaz Énergie	73.00	3
6	b	6	(Hungary) Nemzeti Bajnokság I	47.33	3
7	▲ +3	10	(Spain) División de Honor	34.33	3
8	▼ –1	7	(Croatia) 1. HRL	33.00	3
9	Steady	9	(Poland) PGNiG Superliga	27.67	3
10	▲ +1	11	(Sweden) Handbollsligan	14.67	2
11	▲ +1	12	(Switzerland) Spar Premium League	14.00	2
12	▼ –2	10	(Czech Republic) Extraliga	10.00	2
13	Steady	13	(Serbia) Super Liga	9.67	2
14	▲ +1	15	(Turkey) Süper Ligi	5.33	2
15	▲ +1	16	Women Handball Liga Austria	1.67	2
16	▲ +3	19	(North Macedonia) Super Liga	1.00	2
16	▲ +2	19	(Portugal) 1ª Divisão	1.00	2
18	▼ –1	17	(Greece) A1 Ethniki	0.67	2
19	Steady	19	(Netherlands) AFAB Eredivisie	0.33	1
19	▲+11	30	(Slovakia) MOL Liga	0.33	1
19	▲+3	21	(Iceland) Olís deildin	0.33	1

=== Historical rankings 2007-2023 ===
Country	22/23	21/22	20/21	19/20	18/19	17/18	16/17	15/16	14/15	13/14	12/13	11/12	10/11	09/10	08/09	07/08
Hungary	1	1	1	1	1	2	2	1	1	2	2	4	3	3	2	2
Romania	6	4	3	2	4	5	7	5	5	6	5	3	6	6	7	12
Russia	3	2	2	3	3	3	3	3	4	3	7	2	2	2	3	5
Denmark	4	3	4	4	2	1	1	2	2	1	1	1	1	1	1	1
France	2	5	5	5	7	7	6	7	8	8	8	8	9	11	11	11
Norway	5	6	6	6	5	4	4	4	3	5	3	5	4	4	4	3
Germany	9	8	7	7	6	6	5	6	7	7	6	6	7	9	8	9
Montenegro	7	7	9	9	9	8	8	9	9	9	9	12	13	14	13	7
North Macedonia	27	15	8	8	8	9	10	14	16	17	18	18	17	17	14	8
Sweden	11	10	10	10	10	10	11	12	14	15	19	22	25	29	27	26

== History ==
=== 2018/19 ===
Below is the top 10 for 2018/19.

Coefficients for 2018/19
Men						Women					
No.	Federation	Coefficient	CL	EC	ChC	Nr.	Federation	Coefficient	CL	EC	ChC
1.	Germany	128,50	2	3	0	1.	Hungary	114,13	2	3	0
2.	Spain	115,00	2	3	0	2.	Denmark	103,88	2	3	0
3.	Hungary	106,83	1	3	0	3.	Russia	96,88	1	3	0
4.	France	105,83	1	3	0	4.	Romania	81,75	1	3	0
5.	Poland	75,71	1	3	0	5.	Norway	73,13	1	3	0
6.	Denmark	63,33	1	3	0	6.	Germany	70,38	1	3	0
7.	North Macedonia	51,22	1	3	0	7.	France	69,44	1	3	0
8.	Croatia	42,25	1	2	1	8.	North Macedonia	49,82	1	1	2
9.	Portugal	37,33	1	2	1	9.	Montenegro	48,91	1	1	2
10.	Slovenia	36,67	1	2	1	10.	Sweden	31,45	1	1	2
Reference						Reference					

=== 2017/18 ===
Below is the top 10 for 2017/18.

Coefficients for 2017/18
Men						Women					
No.	Federation	Coefficient	CL	EC	ChC	Nr.	Federation	Coefficient	CL	EC	ChC
1.	Germany	139,83	2	3	0	1.	Denmark	113,33	2	3	0
2.	Hungary	119,83	2	3	0	2.	Hungary	110,56	2	3	0
3.	Spain	114,33	1	3	0	3.	Russia	91,44	1	3	0
4.	France	96,17	1	3	0	4.	Norway	68,33	1	3	0
5.	Poland	67,00	1	3	0	5.	Romania	66,22	1	3	0
6.	Denmark	64,33	1	3	0	6.	Germany	64,67	1	3	0
7.	Slovenia	40,83	1	3	0	7.	France	56,64	1	3	0
8.	Republic of Macedonia	39,56	1	2	1	8.	Montenegro	47,33	1	1	2
9.	Croatia	39,25	1	2	1	9.	Republic of Macedonia	41,58	1	1	2
10.	Portugal	36,11	1	2	1	10.	Sweden	34,67	1	1	2
Reference						Reference					

=== 2016/17 ===
Below is the top 10 for 2016/17.

Coefficients for 2016/17
Men						Women					
No.	Federation	Coefficient	CL	EC	ChC	Nr.	Federation	Coefficient	CL	EC	ChC
1.	Germany	154,83	2	3	0	1.	Denmark	108,89	2	3	0
2.	Spain	122,83	2	3	0	2.	Hungary	100,44	2	3	0
3.	Hungary	103,33	1	3	0	3.	Russia	84,00	1	3	0
4.	France	75,33	1	3	0	4.	Norway	74,22	1	3	0
5.	Denmark	70,00	1	3	0	5.	Germany	60,00	1	3	0
6.	Poland	54,22	1	3	0	6.	France	57,00	1	3	0
7.	Slovenia	54,00	1	3	0	7.	Romania	53,22	1	3	0
8.	Republic of Macedonia	40,56	1	2	1	8.	Montenegro	41,50	1	1	2
9.	Romania	36,44	1	2	1	9.	Austria	34,92	1	1	2
10.	Sweden	34,75	1	2	1	10.	Republic of Macedonia	33,67	1	1	2
Reference						Reference					

=== 2015/16 ===
Below is the top 10 for 2015/16.

Coefficients for 2015/16
Men						Women						
No.	Federation	Coefficient	CL	EC	ChC	Nr.	Federation	Coefficient	CL	EC	CWC	ChC
1.	Germany	167,29	2	3	0	1.	Hungary	112,44	2	2	1	0
2.	Spain	105,86	2	3	0	2.	Denmark	100,67	2	2	1	0
3.	France	83,67	1	3	0	3.	Russia	84,44	1	2	2	0
4.	Hungary	74,57	1	3	0	4.	Norway	68,67	1	2	2	0
5.	Denmark	66,71	1	3	0	5.	Romania	67,56	1	2	2	0
6.	Slovenia	59,13	1	3	0	6.	Germany	57,11	1	2	2	0
7.	Poland	38,60	1	3	0	7.	France	53,92	1	2	2	0
8.	Republic of Macedonia	36,40	1	2	1	8.	Spain	45,11	1	1	1	2
9.	Sweden	36,33	1	2	1	9.	Montenegro	42,00	1	1	1	2
10.	Belarus	33,90	1	2	1	10.	Austria	32,17	1	1	1	2
Reference						Reference						

=== 2014/15 ===
Below is the top 10 for 2014/15.

Coefficients for 2014/15
Men						Women						
No.	Federation	Coefficient	CL	EC	ChC	Nr.	Federation	Coefficient	CL	EC	CWC	ChC
1.	Germany	160,50	2	3	0	1.	Hungary	109,22	2	2	1	0
2.	Spain	114,25	2	3	0	2.	Denmark	85,67	2	2	1	0
3.	France	76,86	1	3	0	3.	Norway	83,67	1	2	2	0
4.	Denmark	62,75	1	3	0	4.	Russia	82,22	1	2	2	0
5.	Slovenia	57,80	1	3	0	5.	Romania	74,67	1	2	2	0
6.	Hungary	46,25	1	3	0	6.	Spain	74,22	1	2	2	0
7.	Russia	41,75	1	3	0	7.	Germany	61,44	1	2	2	0
8.	Switzerland	35,00	1	2	1	8.	France	60,92	1	1	1	2
9.	Croatia	34,00	1	2	1	9.	Montenegro	40,11	1	1	1	2
10.	Republic of Macedonia	31,18	1	2	1	10.	Slovenia	33,17	1	1	1	2
Reference						Reference						

=== 2013/14 ===
Below is the top 10 for 2013/14. For men the EC is EHF European Cup, while it for women is EHF Cup.

Coefficients for 2013/14
Men						Women						
No.	Federation	Coefficient	CL	EC	ChC	Nr.	Federation	Coefficient	CL	EC	CWC	ChC
1.	Germany	156,56	3	2	0	1.	Denmark	110,44	2	2	1	0
2.	Spain	114,56	3	2	0	2.	Hungary	97,78	2	2	1	0
3.	France	78,75	2	2	0	3.	Russia	80,78	2	2	1	0
4.	Denmark	55,78	2	2	0	4.	Spain	80,00	2	2	1	0
5.	Slovenia	52,83	2	2	0	5.	Norway	79,11	2	2	1	0
6.	Russia	48,56	2	2	0	6.	Romania	77,00	2	2	1	0
7.	Hungary	43,33	1	2	1	7.	Germany	72,50	2	2	1	0
8.	Switzerland	40,75	1	2	1	8.	France	61,25	1	1	1	2
9.	Croatia	33,75	1	2	1	9.	Montenegro	48,67	1	1	1	2
10.	Romania	33,25	1	2	1	10.	Slovenia	33,73	1	1	1	2
Reference						Reference						

=== 2012/13 ===
Below is the top 10 for 2012/13. For men the EC is EHF European Cup, while it for women is EHF Cup.

Coefficients for 2012/13
Men						Women						
No.	Federation	Coefficient	CL	EC	ChC	Nr.	Federation	Coefficient	CL	EC	CWC	ChC
1.	Germany	149,78	3	2	0	1.	Denmark	126,11	2	2	1	0
2.	Spain	132,89	3	2	0	2.	Hungary	86,44	2	2	1	0
3.	France	69,67	2	2	0	3.	Norway	83,56	2	2	1	0
4.	Russia	56,50	2	2	0	4.	Spain	81,78	2	2	1	0
5.	Hungary	51,78	2	2	0	5.	Romania	75,78	2	2	1	0
6.	Slovenia	50,64	2	2	0	6.	Germany	75,55	2	2	1	0
7.	Denmark	50,56	1	2	1	7.	Russia	66,44	2	2	1	0
8.	Switzerland	44,750	1	2	1	8.	France	61,83	1	1	1	2
9.	Romania	37,50	1	2	1	9.	Montenegro	37,42	1	1	1	2
10.	Croatia	29,75	1	2	1	10.	Slovenia	35,82	1	1	1	2
Reference						Reference						

=== 2011/12 ===
Below is the top 10 for 2011/12.

Coefficients for 2011/12
Men							Women						
No.	Federation	Coefficient	CL	EC	CWC	ChC	No.	Federation	Coefficient	CL	EC	CWC	ChC
1.	Germany	144,78	3	2	1	0	1.	Denmark	124,67	2	2	1	0
2.	Spain	127,22	3	2	1	0	2.	Russia	81,22	2	2	1	0
3.	Hungary	65,22	2	2	1	0	3.	Romania	77,90	2	2	1	0
4.	France	58,11	2	2	1	0	4.	Hungary	77,56	2	2	1	0
5.	Russia	57,40	2	2	1	0	5.	Norway	77,44	2	2	1	0
6.	Denmark	56,78	2	2	1	0	6.	Germany	67,50	2	2	1	0
7.	Switzerland	49,25	1	1	1	2	7.	Spain	66,89	2	2	1	0
8.	Slovenia	48,10	1	1	1	2	8.	France	55,75	1	1	1	2
9.	Romania	37,00	1	1	1	2	9.	Austria	42,58	1	1	1	2
10.	Croatia	29,67	1	1	1	2	10.	Slovenia	36,30	1	1	1	2
Reference							Reference						

=== 2010/11 ===
Below is the top 10 for 2010/11.

Coefficients for 2010/11
Men							Women						
No.	Federation	Coefficient	CL	EC	CWC	ChC	No.	Federation	Coefficient	CL	EC	CWC	ChC
1.	Germany	151,22	3	2	1	0	1.	Denmark	116,44	2	2	1	0
2.	Spain	131,89	3	2	1	0	2.	Russia	100,67	2	2	1	0
3.	Denmark	68,11	2	2	1	0	3.	Hungary	87,33	2	2	1	0
4.	Hungary	67,33	2	2	1	0	4.	Norway	79,78	2	2	1	0
5.	France	52,56	2	2	1	0	5.	Spain	74,11	2	2	1	0
6.	Russia	51,18	2	2	1	0	6.	Romania	73,91	2	2	1	0
7.	Slovenia	50,78	1	1	1	2	7.	Germany	59,18	2	2	1	0
8.	Switzerland	50,33	1	1	1	2	8.	Austria	48,00	1	1	1	2
9.	Romania	40,75	1	1	1	2	9.	France	45,33	1	1	1	2
10.	Croatia	37,08	1	1	1	2	10.	Croatia	44,33	1	1	1	2
Reference							Reference						

=== 2009/10 ===
Below is the top 10 for 2009/10.

Coefficients for 2009/10
Men							Women						
No.	Federation	Coefficient	CL	EC	CWC	ChC	No.	Federation	Coefficient	CL	EC	CWC	ChC
1.	Germany	141,67	3	2	1	0	1.	Denmark	104,11	2	2	1	0
2.	Spain	125,33	3	2	1	0	2.	Russia	101,67	2	2	1	0
3.	Denmark	70,11	2	2	1	0	3.	Hungary	93,56	2	2	1	0
4.	Hungary	63,89	2	2	1	0	4.	Norway	72,56	2	2	1	0
5.	France	57,89	2	2	1	0	5.	Spain	72,33	2	2	1	0
6.	Russia	55,91	2	2	1	0	6.	Romania	57,08	2	2	1	0
7.	Slovenia	46,00	1	1	1	2	7.	Slovenia	48,11	2	2	1	0
8.	Switzerland	44,33	1	1	1	2	8.	Austria	46,08	1	1	1	2
9.	Romania	42,67	1	1	1	2	9.	Germany	44,50	1	1	1	2
10.	Croatia	39,25	1	1	1	2	10.	Croatia	44,50	1	1	1	2
Reference							Reference						

=== 2008/09 ===
Below is the top 10 for 2008/09.

Coefficients for 2008/09
Men							Women						
No.	Federation	Coefficient	CL	EC	CWC	ChC	No.	Federation	Coefficient	CL	EC	CWC	ChC
1.	Spain	130,11	3	2	1	0	1.	Denmark	113,56	2	2	1	0
2.	Germany	128,11	3	2	1	0	2.	Hungary	97,78	2	2	1	0
3.	France	62,56	2	2	1	0	3.	Russia	77,00	2	2	1	0
4.	Denmark	55,00	2	2	1	0	4.	Norway	69,89	2	2	1	0
5.	Slovenia	52,56	2	2	1	0	5.	Spain	68,89	2	2	1	0
6.	Hungary	52,00	2	2	1	0	6.	Slovenia	48,11	2	2	1	0
7.	Russia	49,83	1	1	1	2	7.	Romania	46,83	2	2	1	0
8.	Croatia	45,82	1	1	1	2	8.	Germany	45,91	1	1	1	2
9.	Switzerland	38,58	1	1	1	2	9.	Croatia	44,00	1	1	1	2
10.	Romania	37,42	1	1	1	2	10.	Austria	39,42	1	1	1	2
Reference							Reference						
