= Leeds Carnegie Handball Club =

English handball club

- Short name: LCHC
- Founded: 2001
- Arena: Leeds Carnegie Sports Centre
- Capacity: 50
- President: -
- Head coach: -
- League: Northern Development League
- Club colours
Home	Away

Leeds Carnegie Handball Club (LCHC) is a university-based, amateur handball club, registered with the England Handball Association. LCHC hosts both men's and women's teams, and is based at Leeds Metropolitan University, Leeds, West Yorkshire, England.

== Background ==
LCHC is affiliated to the England Handball Association and currently competes in the North - Development League. The club was established in 2001, under the name Leeds Metropolitan University Handball Club, however the organisation's name changed in 2010 to incorporate the name 'Carnegie' so as to better reflect the club's association with the Leeds Carnegie sporting brand.

The club purports to welcome students and non-students of all ages, abilities, genders and nationalities and draws players from the student body at Leeds Metropolitan University. LCHC is run by a committee of students from the university, but also works in partnership with Leeds Metropolitan University's Athletic Union and University Sport and evidences the good work students can do in partnership with local communities.

== Honours ==
Since 2001, the club has accommodated both men's and women's teams, who have in the past competed in England's Division 1 Northern League (being the first team in Leeds to do so), and both have acquired a number of titles in that time: most notably, Men's Student Championship Winners 2002; Men's Student Championship Bronze Medallists 2009; Women's Student Championship Winners 2004; Men's North Development League winners 2009/2010 and 2010/2011 and Women's 2013 University Championship Runners Up.

In the past years the club has provided players to the Great Britain national team.
