= British Handball =

Sports governing body for handball in the UK

British Handball Association French: Association Britannique de Handball BHA
- IOC nation: Great Britain (GBR)
- Sport: Handball
- Other sports: Beach Handball; Wheelchair Handball
- Official website: www.britishhandball.com

HISTORY
- Year of formation: 1967; 59 years ago

AFFILIATIONS
- International federation: International Handball Federation (IHF)
- IHF member since: 1970; 56 years ago
- Continental association: European Handball Federation (EHF)
- National Olympic Committee: British Olympic Association (BOA)

GOVERNING BODY
- President: Mr. Stephen Neilson (Scotland) (United Kingdom)
- Address: Halliwell Jones Stadium, Warrington
- Country: England (United Kingdom)

The British Handball Association is the governing body of handball in Great Britain. It has been a member of the International Handball Federation (IHF) since 1970 and of the European Handball Federation (EHF) (for IHF matters). Other representation at European level is under different national associations: the England Handball Association and the Scottish Handball Association. This dual structure, which is shared by several others sports, reflects the conflict between the desire of the home nations to organise the sport separately, and the need to have an overall body for international purposes, such as the Olympics.

== History ==
The British Handball Association was founded in Liverpool in 1967 by four Liverpool teachers Phil Holden, Chris Powell, Jeff Rowland and Andy Smith. In 1968 the Association was accepted as a member of the International Handball Federation. Prior to this the IHF had recognised the Hull Handball League which existed between 1958 and 1963.

== British Cup ==
The British Cup was a knock-out competition for British Handball Clubs.

=== Results (Men) ===
Year	Winners	Losing Finalists	Score	Venue
1977	Birkenhead	Kirkby	17-16	Bootle
1978	Kirkby Select	Halewood Forum	21-16	Hinckley
1979	Brentwood '72	Kirkby Select	21-16	Whitchurch
1980	Brentwood '72	Kirkby Select	20-15	Stantonbury
1981	Brentwood '72	Liverpool	21-18	Leicester
1982	Brentwood '72	Liverpool	17-15	Coventry
1983	Liverpool	Brentwood '72	14-13	Coventry
1984	Liverpool	Carlsberg Milton Keynes	24-22	Bristol
1985	Brentwood '72	Salford	20-14	East Kilbride
1986	Liverpool	Birkenhead		Birkenhead
1987	Salford Man Utd	Tryst		Kirkby
1988	Ruislip Eagles	Liverpool		Leicester
1989				Manchester
1990				
1991				
1992	Manchester United	London Ruislip Eagles	23-21	Manchester
1993	Manchester United	Tryst	28-20	Manchester
1994	London Ruislip Eagles	Manchester United	23-20	Manchester
1995				
1996	Tryst			
1997				
1998		Birkenhead		
1999	Tryst			
2000	Tryst			
2001				
2002				
2003	Tryst	Ruislip Eagles		
2004	Great Dane			
2005	Great Dane	Tryst	36-19	Nottingham
2006	Great Dane	Tryst	19-18	Nottingham
2007	Great Dane	Tryst	25-23	Sheffield
2008	Great Dane	Oxford University	22-20	Liverpool

Data sources: 1977–1982; 1983; 1986 & 1998; 1987, 1996, 1999 & 2000; 2005 British Handball Association; 2006 London GD; 2004 & 2007 Great Dane Handball Club Club Achievements.

== National Teams ==
=== Results Men (Senior) ===
Year	Date	Opposition	Score	Venue	Competition
1959	June 28	Holland	5-15	Costello Stadium, West Hull	11-a-side Friendly pre-BHA
1960	Aug 25	Germany (Freiburg)	3-12	BOCM, Stoneferry, Hull	11-a-side Friendly pre-BHA
1969	Mar 1	Italy	12–30	Edge Hill College, Ormskirk	Friendly
1972	Mar 15	Spain	5–40	Spain	Olympic Qualification (group stage)
1972	Mar 17	Switzerland	2–37	Spain	Olympic Qualification (group stage)
1972	Mar 18	Luxembourg	12–37	Spain	Olympic Qualification (group stage)
1972	Mar 21	Italy	15–25	Spain	Olympic Qualification (play-off)
1972	Mar 23	Belgium	1–31	Spain	Olympic Qualification (play-off)
1974	Sep	Belgium	4–39	Belgium	Friendly
1975	Nov 8	Poland	5–43	Poland	Olympic Qualification (group stage)
1975	Nov 30	Norway	5–55	Scotland	Olympic Qualification (group stage)
1976	Feb 7	Poland	11–55	Picketts Lock	Olympic Qualification (group stage)
1976	Feb 22	Norway	12–43	Norway	Olympic Qualification (group stage)
1978	Jan	Israel	8–28	Great Britain	Friendly
1978	Jan	Israel	8–20	Great Britain	Friendly
1978	Jan	Ireland	24–10	Great Britain	Friendly
1978	Sep	Faroe Islands	11–41	Faroe Islands	Friendly
1978	Sep	Faroe Islands	13–35	Faroe Islands	Friendly
1980		Belgium	17–24	Faroe Islands	World Championship European C Group (Pool B)
1980		France	8–48	Faroe Islands	World Championship European C Group (Pool B)
1980		Israel	17–37	Faroe Islands	World Championship European C Group (Pool B)
1980		Portugal	10–28	Faroe Islands	World Championship European C Group (Pool B)
1980		Italy	17–31	Faroe Islands	World Championship European C Group (play-off 9th/10th)
1981	Nov	Belgium	11–34	Belgium	Friendly
1982	Feb	Bulgaria	13–25	Belgium	World Championship European C Group (Pool A)
1982	Feb	Faroe Islands	10–26	Belgium	World Championship European C Group (Pool A)
1982	Feb	Italy	15–27	Belgium	World Championship European C Group (Pool A)
1982	Feb	Norway	11–42	Belgium	World Championship European C Group (Pool A)
1982	Feb	Finland	9–38	Belgium	World Championship European C Group (play-off 9th/10th)
1983	Sep	Jordan	30–25	Jordan	Friendly
1983	Sep	Jordan	21–20	Jordan	Friendly
1983	Sep	Jordan	20–19	Jordan	Friendly
1984	Jan 27	Austria	14–26		Friendly
1984	Jan 29	Austria	12–31		Friendly
1984	Feb	Austria	12–32	Brixen, Italy	World Championship European C Group (Pool B)
1984	Feb	Netherlands	13–22	Rovereto, Italy	World Championship European C Group (Pool B)
1984	Feb	Faroe Islands	21–19	Rovereto, Italy	World Championship European C Group (Pool B)
1984	Feb	Bulgaria	15–38	Brixen, Italy	World Championship European C Group (Pool B)
1984	Feb	Turkey	15–25	Brixen, Italy	World Championship European C Group (Pool B)
1984	Feb	Belgium	20–27	Rome, Italy	World Championship European C Group (play-off 9th/10th)
1986	Feb	France	39-16	Portugal	World Championship European C Group
1986	Feb	Austria	26-13	Portugal	World Championship European C Group
1986	Feb	Portugal	40-11	Portugal	World Championship European C Group
1986	Feb	Luxembourg	19-16	Portugal	World Championship European C Group
1986	Feb	Greece	23-19	Portugal	World Championship European C Group
1988	Feb	Belgium	18-28	Portugal	World Championships Group C
1988	Feb	Netherlands	12.-34	Portugal	World Championships Group C
1988	Feb	Austria	15-37	Portugal	World Championships Group C
1988	Feb	Turkey	11-.28	Portugal	World Championships Group C
1999	Sep 14	Ireland	34-11	Nicosia (Cyprus)	EHF Challenge Trophy
1999	Sep 15	Malta	34-8	Nicosia (Cyprus)	Challenge Trophy
1999	Sep 16	Cyprus	10-27	Nicosia (Cyprus)	Challenge Trophy
1999	Sep 17	Moldova	22-32	Nicosia (Cyprus)	Challenge Trophy
1999	Sep 18	Armenia	29-19	Nicosia (Cyprus)	Challenge Trophy
1999	Sep 19	Armenia	30-20	Nicosia (Cyprus)	Challenge Trophy (play-off 3rd/4th)
2003	Dec 17	Moldova	9-38	Msida (Malta)	EHF Challenge Trophy
2003	Dec 18	Liechtenstein	27-23	Msida (Malta)	Challenge Trophy
2003	Dec 18	Azerbaijan	14-29	Msida (Malta)	Challenge Trophy
2003	Dec 19	Malta	19-16	Msida (Malta)	Challenge Trophy
2003	Dec 20	Ireland	26-12	Msida (Malta)	Challenge Trophy
2003	Dec 19	Malta	19-16	Msida (Malta)	Challenge Trophy (play-off 3rd/4th)
2007	Jan	Australia	14–37	Rødding, Denmark	Friendly
2007	Jan	Australia	15–33	Rødding, Denmark	Friendly
2008	Oct	Sultanate of Oman	23–29	Muscat	Friendly
2008	Oct	Sultanate of Oman	28–22	Muscat	Friendly
2008	Oct	Sultanate of Oman	20–27	Muscat	Friendly
2009	Jun 12	Greece	26–33		Friendly
2009	Jun 15	Greece	20–35		Friendly
2009	Aug	Japan	22–35	Istres (FRA)	Friendly
2009	Aug	Algeria	19–29	Istres (FRA)	Friendly
2009	Oct 29	Luxembourg	32–32	Luxembourg	Friendly
2009	Oct 30	Belgium	23–25	Luxembourg	Friendly
2010	Jan 2	Switzerland	18–33	Winterthur (SUI)	Yellow-Cup
2010	Jan 3	Tunisia	24–42	Winterthur (SUI)	Yellow-Cup
2010	Jan 4	Netherlands	21–39	Winterthur (SUI)	Yellow-Cup
2010	Jan 8	Tunisia	23–33	Paris (FRA)	Marrane-Cup
2010	Jan 9	Qatar	26–38	Paris (FRA)	Marrane-Cup
2010	Jan 10	Czech Republic	22–32	Paris (FRA)	Marrane-Cup
2010	Jan 15	Romania	27–36	Vantaa (FIN)	2011 World Cup Qualifier
2010	Jan 16	Bosnia	19–44	Vantaa (FIN)	World Cup Qualifier
2010	Jan 17	Finland	21–35	Vantaa (FIN)	World Cup Qualifier
2010	Jun 4	Belgium	26–24	Brussels (BEL)	Friendly
2010	Jun 5	Belgium	22–36	Brussels (BEL)	Friendly
2010	Jun 10	Cyprus	16–24	London (UK)	2012 European Championship Qualifier
2010	Jun 11	Estonia	26–35	London (UK)	European Championship Qualifier
2010	Jun 12	Bulgaria	33–32	London (UK)	European Championship Qualifier
2011	Nov 02	Israel	26–29	London (UK)	2013 World Championship Qualifier
2011	Nov 06	Israel	20–29	Rishion Le Zion(ISR)	World Championship Qualifier
2012	Jan 05	Austria	22–37	Tulln (Austria)	World Championship Qualifier
2012	Jan 08	Austria	24–40	London (UK)	World Championship Qualifier
2012	Jun 08	Switzerland	21–38	Bari (IT)	2014 European Championship Qualifier
2012	Jun 09	Greece	30–35	Bari (IT)	European Championship Qualifier
2012	Jun 10	Italy	29–26	Bari (IT)	European Championship Qualifier
2012	Jul 29	France	15–44	London (UK)	Olympic Group A
2012	Jul 31	Sweden	19–41	London (UK)	Olympic Group A
2012	Aug 02	Argentina	21–32	London (UK)	Olympic Group A
2012	Aug 04	Tunisia	17–34	London (UK)	Olympic Group A
2012	Aug 06	Iceland	24–41	London (UK)	Olympic Group A
2012	Oct 31	Greece	14-43	Loutraki (GRE)	2016 European Championship Qualifier
2013	Apr 04	Italy	23-47	Motherwell (UK)	European Championship Qualifier
2013	Apr 07	Greece	20-32	London (UK)	European Championship Qualifier
2013	Jun 06	Italy	26-37	Lavis (IT)	European Championship Qualifier
2015	Jun 20	Estonia	27-26	Prishtina (Kosovo)	Emerging Nations Men's Championship
2015	Jun 21	Cameroon	16-23	Prishtina (Kosovo)	Emerging Nations Men's Championship
2015	Jun 22	Albania	67-22	Prishtina (Kosovo)	Emerging Nations Men's Championship
2015	Jun 24	Armenia	38-20	Prishtina (Kosovo)	Emerging Nations Men's Championship
2015	Jun 25	Australia	32-26	Prishtina (Kosovo)	Emerging Nations Men's Championship
2015	Jun 26	China	28-22	Prishtina (Kosovo)	Emerging Nations Men's Championship
2015	Aug 29	Ireland	43-16	London (UK)	Friendly

Data Sources 1959 & 1960 1969 ; 1976 ; 2008

=== Results Men (Under 21) ===
Year	Date	Opposition	Score	Venue	Competition
1979	Sep	Lichtenstein		Vaduz (LI)	Friendly
1980	Sep	Lichtenstein	27–25	Milton Keynes (UK)	Friendly
2009	Apr 10	Hungary	21–38	Emmen(NL)	Under-21 World Handball Championship (Qualifier)
2009	Apr 11	Netherlands	25–36	Emmen(NL	Under-21 World Handball Championship (Qualifier)
2009	Apr 12	Iceland	24–35	Emmen(NL)	Under-21 World Handball Championship (Qualifier)
2011	Jan 07	Slovenia	14–46	Nove Veseli(CZ)	Under-21 World Handball Championship (Qualifier)
2011	Jan 08	Czech Republic	29–41	Nove Veseli(CZ)	Under-21 World Handball Championship (Qualifier)
2011	Jan 09	Norway	28–47	Nove Veseli(CZ)	Under-21 World Handball Championship (Qualifier)
2015	Jan	Israel	18–24	Medway Park, Kent (UK)	Under-21 World Handball Championship (Qualifier)
2015	Jan	Hungary	14–37	Medway Park, Kent (UK)	Under-21 World Handball Championship (Qualifier)
2015	Jan	Netherlands	14–46	Medway Park, Kent (UK)	Under-21 World Handball Championship (Qualifier)
