= Leeds Force (women) =

- League: Women's British Basketball League
- Established: 2006
- History: Leeds Carnegie; 2007–2014; Leeds Force; 2014–present
- Arena: Carnegie Sports Centre (Capacity: 500)
- Location: Leeds, West Yorkshire
- Team colours: Violet, White and Black
- Head coach: (United Kingdom) Mark Gunn
- Website: Official website
Home	Away

Leeds Force is an English women's basketball club based in Leeds, West Yorkshire, playing in the Women's British Basketball League. They play their home games at the Carnegie Sports Centre, located on the Headingley Campus of Leeds Metropolitan University in Beckett Park.

The team was established in 2007 as Leeds Carnegie in partnership with Leeds Metropolitan University, as an offshoot from the men's senior team that was established the previous season. In 2014, after seven season's competing in the English Basketball League, the club were accepted into the country's newly created pre-eminent competition, the Women's British Basketball League. In view of the move and to gain more professional independence, the club cut its ties with Leeds Metropolitan University and rebranded as Leeds Force.

The club holds Sport England and England Basketball Club Mark accreditation as well as being an England Basketball Four Star club.

== Home arena ==
Carnegie Sports Centre (2006–present)

== Charitable Foundation ==
The club has also established a charitable arm - the Leeds Carnegie Basketball Foundation (LCBF Charity Number: 114096) - to maintain and develop relationships within the partnership networks to ensure growth and sustainability. The LCBF delivers curricular and extra-curricular sessions, community development and special projects with such partners as the Youth Services Department, Extended Services and West Yorkshire Police.
