= Premier Handball League =

Professional handball league

- Current season, competition or edition: 2025-2026 Premier Handball League
- Sport: Handball
- Founded: 2012 (as The Super 8)
- No. of teams: 8
- Country: England
- Confederation: EHF
- Most recent champion: London GD
- Most titles: London GD Handball Club (14 titles)
- Relegation to: Championship North; Championship South
- International cups: EHF Cup; EHF Challenge Cup
- Website: premier-handball-league

The Premier Handball League is the highest level of men's club handball in England. It is organised by the England Handball Association.

== History ==
The Premier Handball League was formerly known as the Super 8, and was re-branded for the 2017/18 season

Year	Champion	Runner-up	Relegated
1972	Heriot-Watt University		
1973	Ford Warley HC		
1974	Ford Warley HC		
1975	Birkenhead		
1976	Birkenhead		
1977	Birkenhead	Kirkby	
1978	Kirkby Select	Brentwood '72	
1979	Brentwood '72	Kirkby Select	
1980	Brentwood '72	Kirkby Select	
1981	Brentwood '72	Liverpool	
1982	Brentwood '72	Liverpool	
1983	East Kilbride		
1984	Liverpool		
1985	Liverpool		
1986	Kirkby Select		
1987	Liverpool		
1988	Liverpool		
1989	Manchester United		
1990	Manchester United		
1991	Tryst 77		
1992	Tryst 77		
1993	Liverpool		
1994	Manchester United		
1995	Manchester United		
1996	Liverpool		
1997	Salford		
1998	Liverpool		
1999	Tryst 77		
2000	Tryst 77		
2001	Great Dane (London GD)	Ruislip Eagles	
2002	Liverpool		
2003	Liverpool	Ruislip Eagles	
2004	Great Dane (London GD)		
2005	Great Dane (London GD)	Heathrow	
2006	Oxford University	University of Manchester	
2007	University of Manchester	Great Dane HC London	
2008	Great Dane (London GD)	University of Manchester	
2009	Great Dane (London GD)	Olympia HC	
2010	London GD	Olympia HC	
2011	London GD	Ruislip Eagles	
2012	Salford	Ruislip Eagles	
2013	London GD	Salford	Liverpool
2014	London GD	Salford	Deva
2015	Warrington Wolves	London GD	Coventry
2016	London GD	Olympia HC	Manchester
2017	Warrington Wolves	NEM Hawks	Coventry
2018	London GD	Olympia HC	Liverpool
2019	London GD	Olympia HC	Brighton Seahawks
2020	competition suspended due to the Covid-19 pandemic		
2021	not disputed due to the Covid-19 pandemic		
2022	NEM Hawks	London GD	Cambridge HC
2023	NEM Hawks	Olympia HC	
2024	London GD	NEM Hawks	
2025	Oxford University	London GD	NEM Hawks
2026	London GD	Oxford University	

Data sources: 1972-2019; 1975-1976 Wirral Handball Club Clubs and Honours; 1977-1982 Midlands Handball Association (1982) Handball Directory. page 12.; 1983 British Handball Association Word is ... No.5 page 3;

== Format ==
The league consists of 8 teams which play each other two times in a season, once at each team's home venue. 3 points are awarded for each win, 2 points for a draw, and 1 point for a loss. Should the situation occur that two or more clubs finish with the same number of points, their final positions shall be determined by (and in the following order): (A) goal difference; (B) taking into account the results of the head to head Super 8 matches between the clubs concerned; (C) goals scored; (D) further matches played at a neutral venue.

The team that gets 8th place in Men's Premier Handball League will be relegated directly to their nearest Championship League (North or South). Following the final matches of the Championship, a group of playoff matches will take place to figure out the team who will be promoted to the following season's Super 8. The top 2 teams from each championship League will play 2 semifinals as follows:

- North 1 vs South 2
- South 1 vs North 2

The winners of the above semifinals will then play one match to figure out the promotion spot.

== European competitions ==
The Premier Handball League contributes teams to European Handball Federation club competitions. The England Handball Association is awarded places in European competition based on its EHF coefficient rank. Currently the Premier Handball League provides 1 team to the EHF Cup and 3 teams to the EHF Challenge Cup.

== See also ==
- List of handball clubs in England
