= Peterborough Handball Club =

- Full name: Peterborough Handball Club
- Founded: August 2012
- League: East Anglia Development League
- 2013–14: 2nd
- Club colours

Peterborough Handball Club is a handball club based in Peterborough, England. It was founded in August 2012, building on interest in handball generated by the London 2012 Olympics. In the 2012–13 season Peterborough HC's men's team played in the England Handball East Regional League. Peterborough's first win came on 12 January 2013 against Norwich Terriers, Peterborough recording an 18–17 win thanks to a last minute goal by Dan Gammons.

2013-14 Season

Peterborough HC finished second in the East Anglia Development League in the 2013–14 season, behind. Cranfield HC. This success was founded on double victories over Norwich HC, Ipswich HC and a strong Cambridge HC 2nd team.

2014-15 Season

The club began the season with the aim of qualifying for the England Handball play-offs, and with that a passage into the newly created national leagues below the top-level Super 8. While an early poor performance against Cranfield HC lead to a heavy defeat, Peterborough HC bounced back superbly to defeat Ipswich to bring 2014 to a close.
