= West London Eagles Handball Club =

English handball club

- Full name: West London Eagles Handball Club
- Founded: 1972
- Arena: Gunnersbury Park Sports Hub, Gunnersbury Park
- President: JC Lacour
- League: Men's Premier Handball League; Women's Premier Handball League; Men's South East League Tier 1
Home	Away

West London Eagles Handball Club is a team handball club based in Gunnersbury Park, West London. The club has men's and women's teams in the EHA national Premier Handball League (former men's Super 8 and women's Super 7 league) and development teams in the South East regional divisions. They also have junior boys' and girls' teams competing in the U14, U16, U19 and U21 competitions.

== Club history ==
West London Eagles Handball Club was founded in 1972 by Bill Holderness, a GB goalkeeper and were originally based in the old South Ruislip Leisure centre. Originally the teams were largely made up of British players but gradually more overseas players joined the club.

The club had a successful spell through the 1980s playing in the national leagues, when many of their players were picked for the regional and national teams whilst the women won the national league and cup on several occasions alongside fierce rivals Wakefield.

In 1982 the women became the first British team to win a match in a European Cup, beating the Belgian champions over two legs.

The club have previously been known as Graphite Eagles, when sponsored by Graphite Equipment Ltd, and Robert Jenkins following their purchase of the company.

Up until October 2016 the club were known as Ruislip Eagles but removed the Ruislip name in order to build a greater identity within West London. Alongside this name change the club also announced Mizuno as their official kit provider.

In 2021 Eagles moved to the Gunnersbury Park Sports Centre, which serves as a home court for club's league games where most training sessions are held.

== Past performance ==
=== Men's team ===
In 2010 West London Eagles won the EHA Cup after a 26-25 victory over Manchester.

The following season the team qualified to the EHF Challenge Cup for the first time in its history after a second place in the English League 1 and finishing as runner-up in the EHA Cup.

They beat Dublin International Handball Club and the Maltese hosts Aloysians ProMinent but did not qualify for the second round after a defeat against local rivals London GD. That same year the team finished as the runner-up of the National League 1 and therefore qualified for the EHF Challenge Cup again.

In 2012/13 they were again knocked out in the second round of the EHF Challenge Cup after three defeats against the Lithuanian side Dragūnas Klaipėda, SPE Strovolos from Cyprus and the Moldavian host team HC Olimpus-85-USEFS. However, they were guaranteed a place in the EHF Challenge Cup 2013/14 with a 4th-place finish in the newly revamped Super 8 league. The team also finished runner-up in the EHA Cup, losing to Salford H.C in the final.

The team started the 2013/14 season with a defeat in EHF Challenge Cup against the Bulgarian side Spartak Varna with the second leg being broadcast on Bulgarian National TV 1. In domestic competition they reached the semi-finals of the EHA Cup and secured 3rd position in the league.

In the 2014/15 season the team participated again in the EHF Challenge Cup losing in the opening round to Belgian side HC Visé but matched their league position of the previous year securing a European place for the 5th year in a row.

In 2015/16 they lost to eventual champions ABC/UMinho in the opening round but ended the season with a 5th-place finish in the Super 8 league and therefore missed out on an EHF Challenge Cup place for the 2016/17 season.

=== Women's team ===
Historically the women's team have dominated the English game, at one point winning the cup and league for 16 consecutive years, a reign that was ended in 2006/07 by local rivals London GD.

In 2012/13 they finished 4th in the South League 1 and 3rd in the EHA Cup, and accepted an invitation to take up a place in the newly formed Women's Super 8 League for the 2013/14 season.

Since the formation of the Super 8 the women's team has not replicated the success seen throughout the 1990s and 2000s finishing 6th in 2015/16.

In 2019 the women's team won the EHA Cup after the 42:40 double extra time victory in the final against NEM Hawks.

In 2022, after finishing 3rd in the regular season and qualifying for English championship play-offs, women's team went on to finish as runners-up. This meant a spot in the British Super Cup, where Eagles won in the semifinal against Scottish champions Edinburgh HC and lost against NEM Hawks the next day in the final.
