= Olympia HC =

English handball club

- Full name: Olympia Handball Club London
- Founded: 2005
- Arena: Copper Box Arena
- Capacity: 6,000
- President: Sabrina Farhan
- League: Premier Handball League
- Club colours
Home	Away

Olympia Handball Club London is a handball club from London, England that has men’s and women’s teams competing in the Premier Handball League, Regional Development League and a number of Junior leagues.

== Club history ==
The club was established in 2005 as a multi-national team and remains one of the most diverse handball clubs in London, now boasting members from more than 23 countries.

In addition to providing an opportunity for everyone to play handball, Olympia has four senior teams that participate in England Handball Association (EHA) leagues and cup competitions at different levels. Both of the Women and Men's first teams compete in the Premier Handball League, which is contested between the best teams in England. Olympia's second teams participate in the Development League (second tier) for men and women. The club also takes part in domestic handball cup competitions, as well as international tournaments such as the EHF Challenge Cup, EHF Cup, British Beach Handball, Liverpool Handball Festival, and several other friendly tournaments around Europe.

At junior level, Olympia has a satellite club at All Saints Catholic School in Dagenham, East London - pupils compete at national school level, and also have the chance to play for the Under-18 Juniors team.

== Women's Team ==
=== Team 1 - Season 2024/2025 ===
Coach: (Portugal) Nelson Oliveira

Goalkeepers

- (Sweden) Sabrina Oliveira (c)
- (United Kingdom) Sophie O’Sullivan
- (Romania) Elena Bodnarescu

Left wingers

- (Ukraine) Anastasiia Petrovska
- (United Kingdom) Niamh Scannell

Right wingers

- (Romania) Alexandra Ghinter
- (Malta) Daniela Mifsud

Line players

- (Hungary) Vivien Lengyel

Left backs

- (Romania) Alina Popescu
- (Bulgaria) Yoana Markova
- (United Kingdom) Isabella Hughes

Centre backs

- (Australia) Tamara Harmouche
- (Croatia) Marija Stricevic

Right backs

- (Japan) Riko Yamamoto
- (Lithuania) Grete Morkvenaite

=== Honours ===
- Premier Handball League
  - Winners (6) : 2012/13, 2013/14, 2014/2015, 2015/2016, 2016/17, 2018/2019
  - Runners-Up (1) :, 2017/18
- English National Handball Cup
  - Winners (2) : 2013/14, 2015/16

=== European Record ===
Season	Competition	Round	Club	Home	Away	Aggregate
2011-12	Challenge Cup	R2	(Greece) Panetolikos AC	–	0–10(walkover)	0–10
-	-	Group B	(Croatia) RK Zelina	–	18–42	18–42
-	-	-	(Portugal) Alavarium	16–34	–	16–34
2013-14	EHF Cup	R2	(Iceland) Fram	13–38	20–14	27–58
2014-15	EHF Cup	R2	(Ukraine) Karpaty	10–39	38–6	16–77
2016-17	Challenge Cup	R3	(Switzerland) LK Zug	17–45	7–40	24–85

== Men's Team ==
=== Team 1 - Season 2024/2025 ===
Coach: (Romania) Alexandra Ghinter

Goalkeepers

- (Romania) Dan Dragu
- (Iran) Mohammed Barnama
- (Poland) Michal Skrojc

Left wingers

- (Bulgaria) Veselin Georgiev
- (Ukraine) Oleh Bartashchuk

Right wingers

- (São Tomé and Príncipe) Kleyton Eusebio
- (Lithuania) Mantas Treinys

Line players

- (Poland) Bartosz Cholewa
- (Brazil) Thiago Vilela

Left backs

- (Spain) Carlos Navarro
- (Russia) Pavel Tatarintsev

Centre backs

- (Lithuania) Tomas Balnanosi
- (Poland) Dawid Chodyra

Right backs

- (Portugal) Nelson Oliveira (c)
- (Lithuania) Jonas Petrikejevas

=== Honours ===
- Premier Handball League
  - Runners-Up (2) : 2015/16, 2017/18, 2018/19
