= Oxford University Handball Club =

English handball club

Oxford University HC
- Full name: Oxford University Handball Club
- Short name: OUHaC
- Founded: 2001
- Arena: Iffley Road Sports Centre
- President: Joshua Sammet
- Head coach: Jan Kropf
- League: Premier League – South
- Club colours

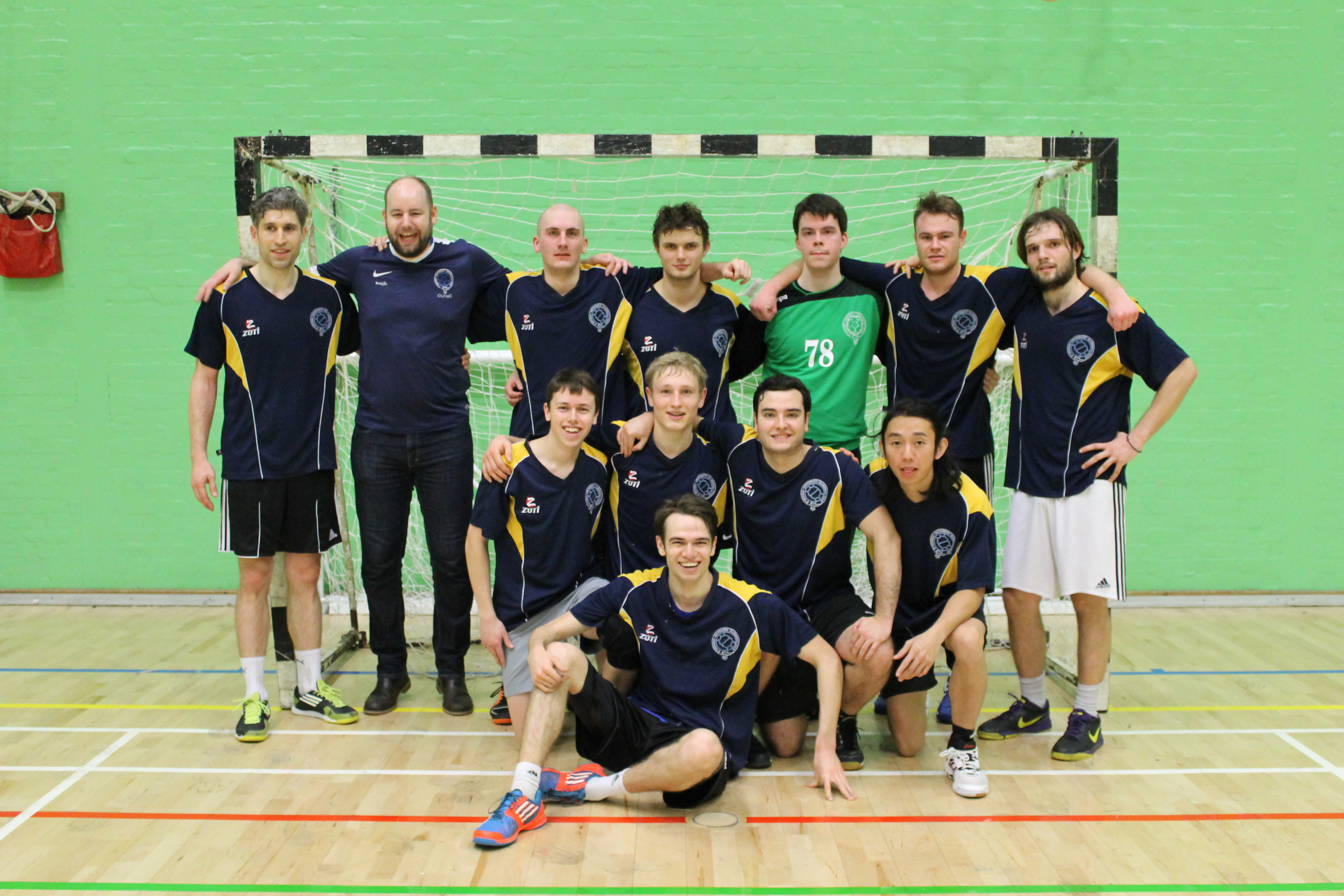
The team of Oxford University Handball Club in the Varsity Match against Cambridge University, January 2018

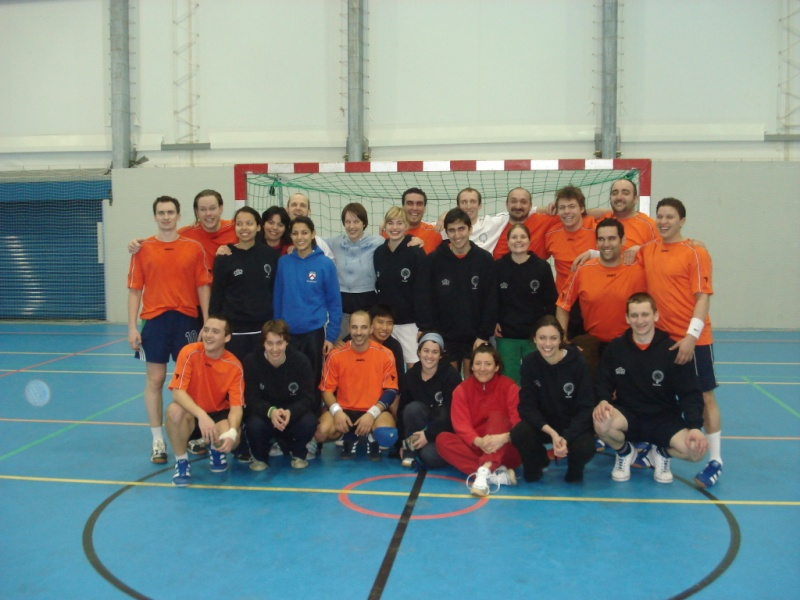
OUHaC after the end of the 2006 season.

Oxford University Handball Club (OUHaC) was founded and registered as a club at the University of Oxford in 2001 and has since established itself as one of England's most successful clubs. It is a member of the England Handball Association since 2002 and the Association of British Universities Handball Clubs since 2011. Every year, OUHaC competes in the English Handball League, EHA Cup and the British University Championships. Beginning in 2014, the club has played in the varsity match against the Cambridge University Handball Club. In 2016 and 2017 respectively, the women's and men's teams were granted Half Blue status by the Blues committees of the University of Oxford. In 2025, the men's team won the EHA title.

== Teams ==
=== Men's team ===
The men's team won the British University Championship title nine times (in 2004–07, 2009, 2013, 2014, 2023 and 2024) as well as the English National League in 2006, being the first ever university team in the history of English handball to win the National League title. Additionally, they were the first university team to compete in the EHF Challenge Cup (2006–07 and 2007–08). They have also won two mixed English Beach Handball tournaments. The team won the EHA League Cup in 2016 and reached the semi-finals of the EHA National Cup in 2017. In 2025, the club won the National League title again, as well as the British Super Cup. With this title, they qualified for the EHF European Cup in the 2025–26 season.

=== Women's team ===
The women's team was created within the club in 2003. The team's greatest achievements include winning the EHA National League 1st Division in 2015 and 2016 as well as the British University Championships in 2016. Moreover, they defeated the University of Cambridge in five consecutive Varsity matches from 2015 to 2019.

== Squad ==
Coach: (Germany) Jan Kropf

Goalkeepers

- (Germany) Joshua Peider Samuel Sammet
- (France) Maxime Vechere

Right wings

- (Iraq) Hadi Al Nuri
- (France) Stephane Sylvain Gerard Chanter

Left wings

- (Brazil) Deyson Reis Dos Santos
- (United Kingdom) Oscar Wellbelove

Line players

- (Algeria) Mohamed Badache
- (Germany) Jan Kropf
- (Iceland) Sigurbjörn Markússon

Left backs

- (Switzerland) Elliot Alphonse Ewald Queisser de Stockalper
- (Portugal) João Ramos Gonçalves de Matos
- (Hungary) Soma Polonkai

Centre backs

- (Spain) Martí Catala Sabaté
- (France) Ardi Kuka
- (Switzerland) Aaron Dominik Leu

Right backs

- (Norway) Jesper Tangen
- (United Kingdom) Joe Luka Mahoney
- (Germany) Marius Palz

== International competitions ==
The men's team of the Oxford University Handball Club has participated twice in European competitions, the EHF Challenge Cup both in 2006 and 2007. They qualified for the first round as winners of the English league in 2006 and as winners of the cup in 2007.

Season	Date	Team 1	Result	Team 2
2006–07	29 September 2006	B.B. Ankara SK	38–14	Oxford University HC
2006–07	30 September 2006	Oxford University HC	12–56	RK Konjuh Namjestaj Zivinice
2006–07	1 October 2006	Riihimäki Cocks	43–22	Oxford University HC
2007–08	28 September 2007	St Patrick's College	25–24	Oxford University HC
2007–08	29 September 2007	Oxford University HC	14–34	Ankara Il Özel Idare SK
2007–08	30 September 2007	Arkatron Minsk	39–19	Oxford University HC

In 2025, the men's team participated in the EHF European Cup for the first time.

Season	Date	Team 1	Result	Team 2
2025–26	18 October 2025	HC Berchem	34–27	Oxford University HC
2025–26	19 October 2025	Oxford University HC	21–43	HC Berchem

== Results summary ==
=== Men's team ===
Season	English League Division 1	English League Division 2 (Regional)	EHA Cup/Shield	University Champs	Varsity
2001–02	–	–	–	3rd	CUHC founded in 2013
2002–03	–	–	–	2nd	CUHC founded in 2013
2003–04	–	–	–	1st	CUHC founded in 2013
2004–05	–	–	–	1st	CUHC founded in 2013
2005–06	1st	–	3rd (Cup)	1st	CUHC founded in 2013
2006–07	3rd	–	3rd (Cup)	1st	CUHC founded in 2013
2007–08	5th	–	3rd (Cup)	2nd	CUHC founded in 2013
2008–09	–	–	–	1st	CUHC founded in 2013
2009–10	–	–	–	4th	CUHC founded in 2013
2010–11	–	1st	QF (Shield)	2nd	CUHC founded in 2013
2011–12	4th	–	–	4th	CUHC founded in 2013
2012–13		–	–	1st	CUHC founded in 2013
2013–14	–	–	–	1st	32–26
2014–15	–	–	–	–	31–24
2015–16	–	–	1st (Shield)	3rd (Note: Division 2 – Plate)	19–27
2016–17	–	2nd	SF (Cup)		26–38
2017–18	–	1st	QF (Cup)		29–31
2018–19	–	–	–		8–23
2019–20	Cancelled due to COVID-19			3rd	26–32
2020–21	Cancelled due to COVID-19			1st	36–30
2021–22	–	1st	–	4th	31–32
2022–23	–	1st	R2 (Cup)	1st	44–23
2023–24	–	1st		1st	39–7
2024–25	1st	-	SF (Cup)	1st	53–14

=== Women's team ===
Season	English League Division 2 (Regional)	English League Division 3	EHA Cup	University Champs	Varsity
2001–02	–	–	–	–	CUHC founded in 2013
2002–03	–	–	–	–	CUHC founded in 2013
2003–04	–	–	–	–	CUHC founded in 2013
2004–05	–	–	2nd (Note: Joint team with N'hampton & S'hampton)	–	CUHC founded in 2013
2005–06	–	–	–	–	CUHC founded in 2013
2006–07	–	–	–	–	CUHC founded in 2013
2007–08	–	–	–	–	CUHC founded in 2013
2008–09	–	–	–	–	CUHC founded in 2013
2009–10	–	–	–	–	CUHC founded in 2013
2010–11	1st (Note: Joint team with S'hampton)	–	–	–	CUHC founded in 2013
2011–12	–	–	–	–	CUHC founded in 2013
2012–13	–	–	–	–	CUHC founded in 2013
2013–14	–	–	–	–	12–23
2014–15	1st	–	–	3rd	31–21
2015–16	1st	–	–	1st	31–14
2016–17	–	–	–	–	27–21
2017–18	–	4th	–	–	16–14
2018–19	–	–	–	–	25–15
2019–20	Cancelled due to COVID-19			4th	21–23
2020–21	Cancelled due to COVID-19			–	Forfeit
2021–22	–	1st	–	1st (Note: Plate – Division 2)	30–21
2022–23	3rd	–	–	8th	28–14
2023–24	3rd	–		7th	24–19
2024–25	3rd	–	–	7th	5–11

== Other links ==
- University Sport Website
- Club Website
