= Liverpool Handball Club =

English handball club from Liverpool

- Founded: 1968
- Arena: Greenbank Academy
- Capacity: 150
- League: English National League North
- Club colours
Home	Away

Liverpool Handball Club is an English handball club from Liverpool and plays in the English National League

== History ==
The club began life in 1968 as St. Andrew's U14s boys school team. This team was the most successful 15/16-year-old boys handball team of the late 1960s and early 1970s, winning the North West of England title on no fewer than four occasions and being runners-up in the National Championship (Men) twice. Before becoming Liverpool, for much of the 1970s the club played under the name Halewood Forum.

The first major honour for the senior side was in 1983 when it defeated Brentwood '72 Handball Club, 14–13, to win the British Handball Association's British Cup.

Liverpool Handball Club played in the Super 8 League but were relegated in 2013. They then played in the second tier of national competition. From here, the club dropped down to the third tier of English Handball. They now reside in the National Handball League North.
