= England Handball Association =

Governing body for handball in England

England Handball Association EHA
- IOC nation: England (ENG)
- Sport: Handball
- Other sports: Beach Handball; Wheelchair handball
- Official website: www.englandhandball.com

HISTORY
- Year of formation: August 27th 2009 (16 years ago)

AFFILIATIONS
- International federation: International Handball Federation (IHF)
- IHF member since: 2017
- Continental association: European Handball Federation
- National Olympic Committee: British Olympic Association
- Other affiliation(s): Commonwealth Handball Association; British Handball Association

GOVERNING BODY
- President: Tracy Watkinson

HEADQUARTERS
- Address: Halliwell Jones Stadium, Warrington
- Country: England
- Secretary General: Mike Bain

The England Handball Association is the governing body for non-International Handball Federation related matters of team handball in England. The British Handball Association has governance over matters relating to the International Handball Federation. It is an Associate member of the European Handball Federation (EHF).

== League ==
The men's league in England is currently divided into three tiers. The elite tier is the Premier Handball League in which 12 teams from England compete to be the national champion split in 2 regions (North and South). The second tier is the Regional League. This competition is currently divided into North and South (and South West and East). Following an end of season play-off in May/June, the overall winners are promoted to the Premier League, replacing the team finishing last in the top division. The runners-up in the Championship play a sudden death promotion match against the seventh placed team in the Super 8 for a place in the top division for the following season.

The lowest tier of competition in senior men's handball in England is the third tier which consists of regional development leagues. The number of divisions varies from year to year during the 2014/15 season there were five regional leagues, London, South-West, East, Midlands and North. As of 2016/17 there are four regional leagues, North, Midlands, South-West and South-East. The South-East regional league is divided into three divisions, Tier 1, 2A and 2B, so 2A and 2B make up the fourth tier of English handball.

There is no automatic promotion from the third to the second tier. The third tier is where clubs are able to demonstrate their development and ability to meet the criteria to join the competition at the second tier.

Tier	Leagues/Divisions				
1	Premier Handball League (PHL) 8 teams - 1 relegation				
2	Championship North		Championship South		
3	North Regional Development League	Midlands Regional Development League	South-West Regional Development League	South-East Regional Development League - Tier 1	
4	No Divisions			South-East Regional Development League - Tier 2A	South-East Regional Development League - Tier 2B

== England Handball League (1972 -2011) ==
=== Men's England Handball League Winners (1972 -2011) ===
Year	Champion	Runner-up
1975	Birkenhead	
1976	Birkenhead	
1977	Birkenhead	
1978	Kirkby Select	
1979	Brentwood '72	
1980	Brentwood '72	
1981	Brentwood '72	Liverpool HC
1982	Brentwood '72	Liverpool HC
1983	Brentwood '72	Liverpool HC
1986	Kirkby Select	
1989	Manchester United	
2000	London GD	West London Eagles
2001	London GD	West London Eagles
2002	Liverpool HC	
2003	Liverpool HC	West London Eagles
2004	London GD	
2005	London GD	Heathrow
2006	Oxford University	
2007	University of Manchester	London GD
2008	London GD	University of Manchester
2009	London GD	Olympia HC
2010	London GD	Olympia HC
2011	London GD	West London Eagles

=== Women's England Handball League Winners (1975 -2011) ===
Year	Champion	Runner-up
1975	Birkenhead	
1976	Birkenhead	
1977	Birkenhead	
1978	Kirkby Select	
1979	Brentwood '72	
1980	Brentwood '72	
1981	Brentwood '72	Liverpool HC
1982	Brentwood '72	Liverpool HC
1983	Brentwood '72	Liverpool HC
1986	Kirkby Select	
1989	Manchester United	
2000	London GD	West London Eagles
2001	London GD	West London Eagles

== Premier Handball League (2012 - today) ==
Main Page: Premier Handball League

=== Men's Premier Handball League Winners ===
Year	Champion	Runner-up	Relegated
2012	Salford	West London Eagles	
2013	London GD	Salford	Liverpool
2014	London GD	Salford	
2015	Warrington Wolves	London GD	Coventry Sharks
2016	London GD	Olympia HC	Deva HC
2017	Warrington Wolves	NEM Hawks	Coventry Sharks
2018	London GD	Olympia HC	Liverpool HC
2019	London GD	Olympia HC	Brighton Seahawks
2020	competition suspended due to the Covid-19 pandemic		
2021	not disputed due to the Covid-19 pandemic		
2022	NEM Hawks	London GD	Cambridge HC
2023	NEM Hawks	Olympia HC	

=== Women's Premier Handball League Winners ===
Year	Champion	Runner-up	Relegated
2012	West London Eagles	London GD	
2013	London GD	Thames Handball Club	
2014	Olympia HC	West London Eagles	
2015	London GD	Coventry Sharks	
2016	Olympia HC	Coventry Sharks	
2017	Coventry Sharks	London GD	
2018	London GD	Coventry Sharks	
2019	West London Eagles	NEM Hawks	
2020	competition suspended due to the Covid-19 pandemic		
2021	not disputed due to the Covid-19 pandemic		
2022			
2023			

== Championship (2nd Tier) ==
=== Men's Championship Winners ===
Year	Champion	Runner-up
1977	Whitchurch (Bristol)	
1978	Olympia (Cannock)	Leicester '73
1979	Leicester '73	
1980	Recreation Nuneaton	Ipswich
1981	Olympia (Cannock)	London GD
-		
2006		Liverpool Hope University
-		
2013	Olympia HC	NEM Hawks
2014	Coventry Sharks	NEM Hawks
2015	NEM Hawks	Brighton Seahawks
2016	Nottingham HC	Coventry Sharks
2017	Liverpool HC	Brighton Seahawks
2018	Brighton Seahawks	Coventry Sharks
2019	Liverpool HC	Carshalton Titans
2020	competition suspended due to the Covid-19 pandemic	
2021	not disputed due to the Covid-19 pandemic	

Data source: 1977-1982 Midlands Handball Association (1982) Handball Directory. page 12;. 2006

== Regional Development Leagues (3rd Tier) ==
Year	Region	Champion	Runner-up
2015	London	London GD II	Thames HC
2015	South	Southampton	Poole Phoenix
2015	East	Cranfield HC	Cambridge HC
2015	Midlands	Loughborough University HC	OlyCats
2015	North	Bolton	Huddersfield

== EHA National Cup ==
The EHA offers two cup competitions for senior males. The EHA National Cup is the cup competition for the top clubs in England. Any club meeting the qualifying criteria may enter. Clubs not eligible for the National Cup may enter the EHA League Cup.

=== Men's EHA National Cup Winners ===
Year	Champion	Runner-up
2009	London GD	
2010	West London Eagles	Manchester Handball Club
2011	London GD	Ruislip Eagles
2012	London GD	Salford
2013	Salford	Ruislip Eagles
2014	Salford	London GD
2015	Warrington Wolves	London GD
2016	Warrington Wolves	London GD
2017	Warrington Wolves	NEM Hawks
2018	London GD	NEM Hawks
2019	Warrington Wolves	Cambridge HC

=== Women's EHA National Cup Winners ===
Year	Champion	Runner-up
2009	West London Eagles	London GD
2010	London GD	Ruislip Eagles
2011	West London Eagles	Olympia HC
2012	West London Eagles	London GD
2013	London GD Handball Club	Thames Handball Club
2014	Olympia HC	Ruislip Eagles
2015	London GD	Coventry Sharks
2016	Olympia HC	Coventry Sharks
2017	Coventry Sharks	London GD
2018	London GD	Coventry Sharks
2019	West London Eagles	NEM Hawks

== EHA National Shield (Previously League Cup) ==
Clubs not eligible for the National Cup may enter the EHA League Cup.

=== Men's National Shield Winners ===
Year	Champion	Runner-up
2015	Cranfield	London GD II
2016	Oxford University	London GD II
2017	London GD II	Reading Lions
2018	Coventry Sharks	Guildford Sabres
2019	Essex Hurricanes	Guildford Sabres

=== Women's National Shield Winners ===
Year	Champion	Runner-up
2017	Reading Lionesses	Liverpool HC
2018	Reading Lionesses	Loughborough University HC
2019	Northampton	London GD II

== See also ==
List of handball clubs in England
