= London GD Handball Club =

English handball club

- Founded: 1976 (as Great Dane Handball Club)
- Arena: Copper Box Arena; Hackney Wick / Stratford
- Capacity: 6,000
- League: Premier Handball League
- Club colours
Home	Away

Affiliated to the EHA, London GD Handball Club currently has 3 men's and 2 women's competitive handball teams in both the English National and Regional leagues, as well as a Youth Development Programme in place to generate Junior squads. The club which was formerly known as London Great Dane was founded in 1976.

== Club history ==
London GD Handball Club was previously known as Great Dane Handball Club, and was founded by Anne-Marie Thrysoe and Andrew Ferguson. Established in 1976 by a group of Danish girls involved with the Anglo-Danish Society Students Club, thereof the name of the club, "Great Dane".

Throughout the years, the club established itself firmly on the English handball scene, and has become much more than a club with mainly Danish players. In 2010, in a bid to reflect this, the club changed its name to London GD Handball Club and at the same time registered as a limited company. The East London-based club currently has over 100 registered players from at least 20 different countries, and many more people training with the club regularly.

The club started playing handball as a women's team only, with men occasionally coming to practice. They started training two days a week at Ruislip Eagles Sport Centre but soon moved to the new (at the time) Wapping Sport Centre in East London. London GD's main home ground is now the Olympic Handball Arena, also known as "Copper Box", although Leyton Score Centre remains as training venue for developing teams.

From 1976 to 1986, the club was heavily involved in the development of Handball in London with at one stage two sub venues spun off including Croydon and West London. The club also merged with another club at one stage run by Paul Bray.

Around 1980, members of the club formed the Greater London & South East Handball Association together with Ashford Tanners, Ruislip, Ipswich and other clubs in East London. The association is no longer active, but London GD is a member of the newly established London Handball Association that was set up in 2010.

In 2000, the back then called Great Danes started to get some success in both women's and men's handball and from then on the club has always been among the top three clubs in the country.

In 2005 the club participated in its first official European Competition by playing in round 2 of the men's Challenge Cup. Since then, London GD have participated every year.

In 2010, after winning their third Double (League and Cup Champions), the club's women's 1st team entered the Challenge Cup for the first time, managing an historic win against A.S. Aris Thessalonikis from Greece.

The 2010/11 season resulted in both league and cup victory for the men's team. This past September 2011 they have made history by winning their round 2 group in Malta to go through round 3 in Greece for the first time.

For the 2011/2012 season we entered two-second teams in the development leagues, both men and women, with the former winning the South Regional Championship.

After the London 2012 Olympic Games, London GD men 1st team participated in the new EHF Cup against a giant Danish Club, KIF Kolding Kopenhagen, playing their two games at foreign ground.

This past season 2012/2013 London GD ladies won the EHA Cup against Thames Handball Club, and the club's men 1st team won the Super 8 English National League without losing any single game, giving them the unique slot for EHF Cup again, which saw them playing against a Turkish team from Ankara in September 2013.

== Men’s Team ==
=== Team 1 ===
Coach: (Serbia) Zoran Lukacs

Goalkeepers

- (France) Clement Baudot
- (United Kingdom) Thomas Martin-Eckersall
- (United Kingdom) Patrick Guenther

Left wingers

- (Romania) Danut Nelutescu
- (United Kingdom) Aaron Bradley-Shankar
- (United Kingdom) Ibukun Lawal
- (United Kingdom) Morgan Gillett

Right wingers

- (France) Cesar Castro
- (Belgium) Ben Luyten
- (France) Jeremy Archier

Line players

- (United Kingdom) Oliver Tyler (c)

Left backs

- (Spain) Jorge Gonzalez
- (United Kingdom) Joey Amoah
- (United Kingdom) Maxamillian Grant

Centre backs

- (Australia) Caleb Gahan
- (United Kingdom) Reuben Wardle

Right backs

- (Ukraine) Denys Tyshchenko
- (Australia) Christopher Duffy

== Women’s Team ==
=== Team 1 ===
Coach: (Australia) Caleb Gahan

Goalkeepers

- (Poland) Nicole Zdzieblo
- (Germany) Maren Weiler

Left wingers

- (Spain) Cristina Medina

Right wingers

- (New Zealand) Tara Van Der Post

Line players

- (Norway) Kaja Sunde
- (Sweden) Cornelia Flodell

Left backs

- (Lithuania) Juste Brazenaite

Centre backs

- (Italy) Tania Corti (c)

Right backs

- (Norway) Mette Leipart

== Club achievements ==
=== Men's First Team ===
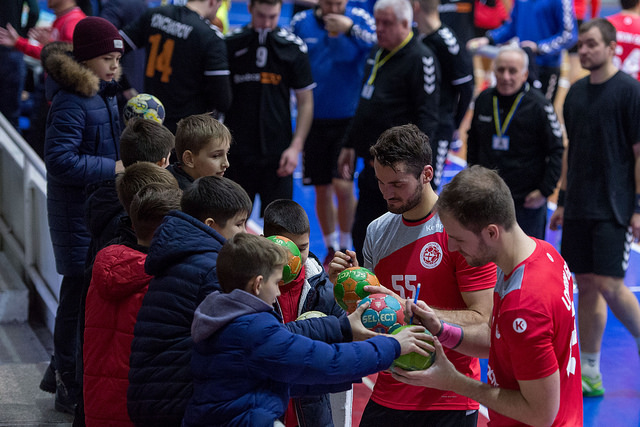
Men's First Team in 2019

Competition	Years
Premier Handball League	Champion: 2018, 2016, 2014, 2013, 2011, 2010, 2009, 2008, 2005, 2001, 2000; Runners up: 2015, 2007
English Cup	Winner: 2018, 2012, 2011, 2009; Runners up: 2016, 2015, 2014
British Cup	Winner: 2008, 2007, 2006, 2005, 2004
Weymouth Beach Handball Champions	Champion: 2007; Runners up: 2006
British Beach Handball	Champion: 2015, 2014, 2013
Oktopus Tournament (Eindhoven)	Winner: 2005

=== Women's First Team ===
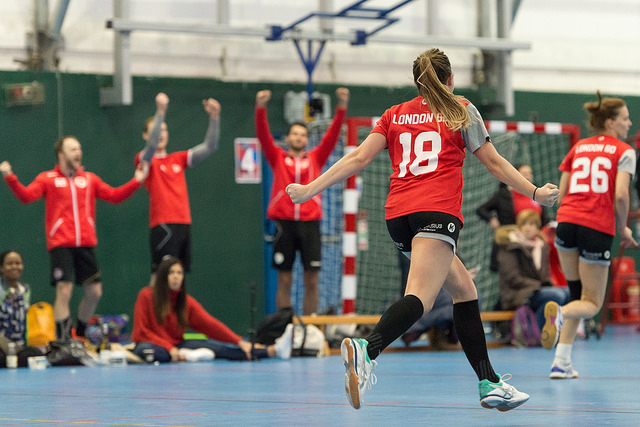
Women's First Team in 2018

Competition	Years
English League	Champion: 2018, 2016, 2015, 2010, 2007, 1986; Runners up:2017, 2013, 2012, 2011, 2009, 2008, 2006, 2005, 2004
English Cup	Winner: 2018, 2015, 2013, 2010; Runners up:2012, 2011, 2009
British Cup	Winner: 2007, 1986; Runners up:2005
British Beach Handball Plate	Winner: 2013
Oktopus Tournament (Eindhoven)	Winner: 2006, 2005

== European track record ==
Women

Season	Competition	Round	Club	1st leg	2nd leg	Aggregate
2018–19	EHF Challenge Cup	R2	No participation due to the lack of budget			
2017–18	EHF Challenge Cup	R2	(Lithuania) MRK Žalgiris Kaunas	13–42	21–32	34–74
2016–17	EHF Cup	R2	No participation due to the lack of budget			
2015–16	EHF Cup	R2	(Greece) OF Nea Ionia	11–35	17–27	28–62
2010–11	EHF Cup	R2	Group phase			

Men

Season	Competition	Round	Club	1st leg	2nd leg	Aggregate
2018–19	EHF Challenge Cup	1/16 finals	(Ukraine) Shakhtar-Academiya	22–40	15–33	37–73
2017–18	EHF Challenge Cup	1/16 finals	(Greece) AEK H.C.	16–40	21–41	37–81
2016–17	EHF Cup	R1	(Israel) Maccabi Rishon LeZion (handball)	14–38	22–41	36–79
2015–16	EHF Challenge Cup	R3	(Estonia) HC Kehra	16–37	26–43	42–80
2014–15	EHF Cup	R1	(Netherlands) Limburg Lions	18–28	12–44	30–72
2013–14	EHF Cup	R1	(Turkey) Ankara BB SK	14–44	18–38	32–82
2012–13	EHF Cup	R1	(Denmark) KIF Kolding	16–46	16–42	32–88
2011–12	EHF Challenge Cup	R3	(Greece) AC Doukas	20–30	15–36	35–66
2010–11	EHF Challenge Cup	R2	Group phase			
2009–10	EHF Challenge Cup	R2	Group phase			
2008–09	EHF Challenge Cup	R2	Group phase			
2007–08	EHF Challenge Cup	R2	Group phase			
2006–07	EHF Challenge Cup	Group matches	Group phase			
2005–06	EHF Challenge Cup	R2	Group phase			

== Individual players' achievements ==
=== Greater-London and South-East Select Men's Team 1981 ===
Thorkild Hove and Paul Bray

=== Players who played for national teams ===
- Will Moore United Kingdom
- Aleksandra Garaloska (North Macedonia) Macedonia
- Francesca Graham New Zealand
- Maria Marselli Cyprus (beach handball)

=== Juniors playing for national teams ===
- GB (United Kingdom) Naomi Bell
- GB (United Kingdom) Aaron Bradley Shankar
- GB (United Kingdom) Bill Taylor
