= Nemzeti Bajnokság I top scorers (women's handball) =

The following list shows the Nemzeti Bajnokság I top scorers season by season

Season	Player	Club
1959	(Hungary) Magda Jóna	Győri Vasas ETO
1960	(Hungary) Magda Jóna	Győri Vasas ETO
1962	(Hungary) Szmolkáné	Pécsi Bányász
1963	(Hungary) Magda Jóna	Budapest Spartacus SC
1964	(Hungary) Magda Jóna	Budapest Spartacus SC
1965	(Hungary) Bakó Elemérné	Győri Textiles
1966	(Hungary) Klára Horváth	Testnevelési Főiskola
1967	(Hungary) Klára Horváth	Testnevelési Főiskola
1968	(Hungary) Schmidt Jenőné	Pécsi Bányász
1969	(Hungary) Piroska Németh	Tatabányai Bányász
1970	(Hungary) Borbála Tóth Harsányi	Bakony Vegyész SK
1971	(Hungary) Piroska Németh	Tatabányai Bányász
1972	(Hungary) Takács Péterné	Ferencvárosi TC
1973	(Hungary) Piroska Németh	Tatabányai Bányász
1974	(Hungary) Piroska Németh	Tatabányai Bányász
1975	(Hungary) Piroska Németh	Tatabányai Bányász
1976	(Hungary) Éva Csulik	Ferencvárosi TC
1977	(Hungary) Amália Sterbinszky	Vasas SC
1978	(Hungary) Éva Csulik	Ferencvárosi TC
1979	(Hungary) Amália Sterbinszky	Vasas SC
1981	(Hungary) Erzsébet Sulyok	Győri Textiles
1983	(Hungary) Anna György	Épitők SC
1984	(Hungary) Ilona Kondiné Budai	Borsodi Bányász
1985	(Hungary) Erzsébet Sulyok	Veszprémi SE
1986	(Hungary) Zsuzsa Bánfi	BHG SC
1987	(Hungary) Éva Kiss	Épitők SC
1989-90	(Hungary) Éva Erdős	Budapest Spartacus SC
1990-91	(Hungary) Auguszta Mátyás	Olajbányász SE
1991-92	(Hungary) Auguszta Mátyás	Dunaferr SE
1992-93	(Hungary) Erzsébet Kocsis	Dunaferr SE
1993-94	(Hungary) Eszter Mátéfi	Győri Keksz ETO
1994-95	(Federal Republic of Yugoslavia) Bojana Radulović	Caola SE
1995-96	(Hungary) Zsuzsanna Viglási	Budapest Spartacus SC
1996-97	(Hungary) Zsuzsanna Viglási	Budapest Spartacus SC
1997-98	(Hungary) Florica Buda	Békéscsabai NKC
1998-99	(Hungary) Rita Deli	Herz-FTC
1999-2000	(Hungary) Rita Deli	Herz-FTC
2000-01	(Hungary) Ágnes Farkas	Herz-FTC
2001-02	(Hungary) Auguszta Mátyás	Váci NK
2002-03	(Hungary) Zsuzsanna Viglási	Budapest Spartacus SC
2003-04	(Hungary) Auguszta Mátyás	Váci NK
2004-05	(Hungary) Auguszta Mátyás	Váci NKSE
2005-06	(Hungary) Beatrix Balogh	Cornexi-Alcoa-HSB Holding
2006-07	(Hungary) Judit Veszeli	Váci NKSE
2007-08	(Hungary) Anita Görbicz (Hungary) Renáta Mörtel	Győri Audi ETO KC; Dunaferr NK
2008-09	(Hungary) Anett Sopronyi	Tajtavill-Nyíradony
2009-10	(Hungary) Tímea Tóth	Váci NKSE
2010-11	(Russia) Kristina Trishchuk	Alcoa FKC-RightPhone
2011-12	(Hungary) Anita Bulath	Veszprém Barabás KC
2012-13	(Hungary) Annamária Bogdanović	Siófok KC-Galerius Fürdő
2013-14	(Hungary) Anita Bulath	Dunaújvárosi Kohász KA
2014-15	(Spain) Nerea Pena	Ferencváros
2015-16	(Serbia) Katarina Krpež Slezak	Érd Handball
2016-17	(Hungary) Krisztina Triscsuk	Siófok KC
2017-18	(Serbia) Katarina Krpež Slezak	Érd Handball
2018-19	(Serbia) Katarina Krpež Slezak	Érd Handball
2019-20	(Hungary) Gréta Kácsor	Váci NKSE
2020-21	(Hungary) Tamara Pál	MTK Budapest
2021-22	(Hungary) Csenge Kuczora	Váci NKSE
2022-23	(Hungary) Csenge Kuczora	Váci NKSE
2023-24	(Hungary) Katrin Klujber	Ferencváros
2024-25		
