= 1984 Nemzeti Bajnokság I (women's handball) =

NB I
- Season: 1984 (34.)
- Champions: Vasas SC (12th title)
- European Cup: Vasas SC
- Cup Winners' Cup: Bp. Spartacus
- IHF Cup: Debreceni MVSC
- Top goalscorer: Ilona Kondiné Budai

The 1984 Nemzeti Bajnokság I is the 34th season of the Nemzeti Bajnokság I, Hungary's premier Handball league.

== Final list ==
| # | Team | M | W | D | L | G+ | G− | P | Notes |
|---|---|---|---|---|---|---|---|---|---|
| 1. | Vasas SC | 26 | 21 | 2 | 3 | 575 | 446 | 44 | 1985-86 European Cup round 1 |
| 2. | Bp. Spartacus | 26 | 18 | 3 | 5 | 638 | 537 | 39 | 1985-86 Cup Winners' Cup 1/8 final |
| 3. | Bakony Vegyész | 26 | 17 | 2 | 7 | 685 | 589 | 36 | |
| 4. | Építők SC | 26 | 15 | 3 | 8 | 609 | 567 | 33 | |
| 5. | Debreceni MVSC | 26 | 14 | 2 | 10 | 650 | 603 | 30 | 1985-86 IHF Cup 1/8 final |
| 6. | Tatabányai Bányász | 26 | 14 | 1 | 11 | 575 | 564 | 29 | |
| 7. | Békéscsabai Előre Spartacus SC | 26 | 13 | 1 | 12 | 582 | 582 | 27 | |
| 8. | BHG SE | 26 | 11 | 3 | 12 | 574 | 574 | 25 | |
| 9. | Borsodi Bányász | 26 | 10 | 2 | 14 | 619 | 671 | 22 | |
| 10. | Ferencvárosi TC | 26 | 9 | 2 | 15 | 596 | 584 | 20 | |
| 11. | Dunaújvárosi Kohász | 26 | 9 | 2 | 15 | 578 | 627 | 20 | |
| 12. | Testnevelési Főiskola SE | 26 | 7 | 1 | 18 | 541 | 620 | 15 | |
| 13. | EMG SK | 26 | 6 | 1 | 19 | 520 | 641 | 13 | Relegated to Nemzeti Bajnokság I/B |
| 14. | Győri Textiles | 26 | 5 | 1 | 20 | 551 | 688 | 11 | Relegated to Nemzeti Bajnokság I/B |

* M: Matches W: Win D: Drawn L: Lost G+: Goals earned G−: Goals got P: Point

== Sources ==
- A magyar sport évkönyve 1984
- magyar bajnokságok - kezitortenelem.hu (in Hungarian)
