= 1983 Nemzeti Bajnokság I (women's handball) =

NB I
- Season: 1983 (33.)
- Champions: Bp. Spartacus (8th title)
- European Cup: Bp. Spartacus
- Cup Winners' Cup: Bakony Vegyész
- IHF Cup: Vasas SC
- Top goalscorer: Anna György

The 1983 Nemzeti Bajnokság I is the 33rd season of the Nemzeti Bajnokság I, Hungary's premier Handball league.

== Final list ==
#	Team	M	W	D	L	G+	G−	P	Notes
1.	Bp. Spartacus	26	20	1	5	587	465	41	1984-85 European Cup 1/8 final
2.	Bakony Vegyész	26	20	1	5	682	546	41	1984-85 Cup Winners' Cup 1/8 final
3.	Tatabányai Bányász	26	17	4	5	598	523	38	
4.	Vasas SC	26	18	2	6	570	486	38	1984-85 IHF Cup 1/8 final
5.	Békéscsabai Előre Spartacus SC	26	16	2	8	652	580	34	
6.	Ferencvárosi TC	26	14	2	10	634	633	30	
7.	Építők SC	26	13	3	10	593	551	29	
8.	Dunaújvárosi Kohász	26	12	2	12	596	626	26	
9.	Debreceni MVSC	26	11	2	13	593	584	24	
10.	Győri Textiles	26	8	3	15	580	658	19	
11.	BHG SE	26	8	1	17	543	578	17	
12.	Testnevelési Főiskola SE	26	3	4	19	574	672	10	
13.	Porcelán SK Hódmezővásárhely	26	5	0	21	433	586	10	Relegated to Nemzeti Bajnokság I/B
14.	Postás SE	26	3	1	22	458	605	7	Relegated to Nemzeti Bajnokság I/B

* M: Matches W: Win D: Drawn L: Lost G+: Goals earned G−: Goals got P: Point

== Sources ==
- A magyar sport évkönyve 1983
- magyar bajnokságok - kezitortenelem.hu (in Hungarian)
