= 1978 Nemzeti Bajnokság I (women's handball) =

NB I
- Season: 1978 (28.)
- Champions: Vasas SC (7th title)
- Top goalscorer: Éva Csulikné Bozó

The 1978 Nemzeti Bajnokság I is the 28th season of the Nemzeti Bajnokság I, Hungary's premier Handball league.

== Final list ==
#	Team	M	W	D	L	G+	G−	P	Notes
1.	Vasas SC	22	21	0	1	454	244	42	Champions
2.	Ferencvárosi TC	22	18	1	3	448	340	37	
3.	Tatabányai Bányász	22	16	1	5	323	280	33	
4.	Bp. Spartacus	22	14	2	6	420	346	30	
5.	Testnevelési Főiskola SE	22	11	1	10	341	363	23	
6.	Bakony Vegyész	22	8	4	10	273	274	20	
7.	Postás SE	22	7	4	11	267	306	18	
8.	Győri Textiles	22	8	2	12	300	358	18	
9.	Pécsi MSC	22	7	1	14	314	372	15	
10.	Híradótechnika SK	22	5	3	14	263	322	13	
11.	Borsodi Bányász	22	3	4	15	306	385	10	Relegated to Nemzeti Bajnokság I/B
12.	Eger SE	22	2	1	19	219	338	5	Relegated to Nemzeti Bajnokság I/B

* M: Matches W: Win D: Drawn L: Lost G+: Goals earned G−: Goals got P: Point

== Sources ==
- A magyar sport évkönyve 1978
- magyar bajnokságok - kezitortenelem.hu (in Hungarian)
