= 1980 Nemzeti Bajnokság I (women's handball) =

NB I
- Season: 1980 (30.)
- Champions: Vasas SC (9th title)
- European Cup: Vasas SC
- Cup Winners' Cup: Bp. Spartacus
- IHF Cup: Bakony Vegyész

The 1980 Nemzeti Bajnokság I is the 30th season of the Nemzeti Bajnokság I, Hungary's premier Handball league.

== Final list ==
#	Team	M	W	D	L	G+	G−	P	Notes
1.	Vasas SC	22	21	0	1	417	251	42	1981-82 European Cup 1/8 final
2.	Bp. Spartacus	22	15	4	3	417	353	34	
3.	Ferencvárosi TC	22	14	2	6	427	345	30	
4.	Tatabányai Bányász	22	14	1	7	364	319	29	
5.	Építők SC	22	10	3	9	326	320	23	
6.	Bakony Vegyész	22	10	1	11	335	356	21	
7.	Győri Textiles	22	8	4	10	333	351	20	
8.	Debreceni MVSC	22	7	2	13	318	376	16	
9.	Dunaújvárosi Kohász	22	5	4	13	337	386	14	
10.	BHG SE	22	5	3	14	287	335	13	
11.	Csepel SC	22	4	4	14	315	385	12	Relegated to Nemzeti Bajnokság I/B
12.	Testnevelési Főiskola SE	22	4	2	16	307	406	10	Relegated to Nemzeti Bajnokság I/B

* M: Matches W: Win D: Drawn L: Lost G+: Goals earned G−: Goals got P: Point

== Sources ==
- A magyar sport évkönyve 1980
- magyar bajnokságok - kezitortenelem.hu (in Hungarian)
