= 1985 Nemzeti Bajnokság I (women's handball) =

NB I
- Season: 1985 (35.)
- Champions: Vasas SC (13th title)
- European Cup: Vasas SC
- Cup Winners' Cup: Debreceni MVSC
- IHF Cup: Bp. Spartacus
- Top goalscorer: Erzsébet Sulyok

The 1985 Nemzeti Bajnokság I is the 35th season of the Nemzeti Bajnokság I, Hungary's premier Handball league.

== Final list ==
#	Team	M	W	D	L	G+	G−	P	Notes
1.	Vasas SC	26	24	2	0	672	430	50	1986-87 European Cup 1/8 final
2.	Debreceni MVSC	26	19	0	7	669	573	38	1986-87 Cup Winners' Cup 1/8 final
3.	Bp. Spartacus	26	17	1	8	657	549	35	1986-87 IHF Cup 1/8 final
4.	BHG SE	26	12	5	9	561	565	29	
5.	Építők SC	26	12	5	9	609	594	29	
6.	Győri Richards	26	11	5	10	500	490	27	
7.	Veszprém SE	26	12	2	12	634	613	26	
8.	Békéscsabai Előre Spartacus SC	26	11	3	12	572	606	25	
9.	Dunaújvárosi Kohász	26	10	3	13	563	559	23	
10.	Borsodi Bányász	26	10	3	13	634	643	23	
11.	Tatabányai Bányász	26	10	1	15	609	644	21	
12.	Ferencvárosi TC	26	8	3	15	534	581	19	
13.	Testnevelési Főiskola SE	26	5	1	20	607	745	11	Relegated to Nemzeti Bajnokság I/B
14.	Lehel SC	26	3	2	21	514	743	8	Relegated to Nemzeti Bajnokság I/B

* M: Matches W: Win D: Drawn L: Lost G+: Goals earned G−: Goals got P: Point

== Sources ==
- A magyar sport évkönyve 1985
- magyar bajnokságok - kezitortenelem.hu (in Hungarian)
