= 1964 Nemzeti Bajnokság I (women's handball) =

NB I
- Season: 1964 (14.)
- Champions: Bp. Spartacus (5th title)
- European Cup: Bp. Spartacus
- Top goalscorer: Magdolna Jóna

The 1964 Nemzeti Bajnokság I is the 14th season of the Nemzeti Bajnokság I, Hungary's premier Handball league.

== Final list ==
#	Team	M	W	D	L	G+	G−	P	Notes
1.	Bp. Spartacus	22	18	1	3	256	125	37	1965-66 European Cup 1/4 final
2.	Goldberger SE	22	15	2	5	191	141	32	
3.	Bp. Postás	22	14	0	8	178	145	28	
4.	Pécsi Bányász	22	12	2	8	162	150	26	
5.	VM Közért	22	10	5	7	130	121	25	
6.	Ferencvárosi TC	22	11	3	8	137	133	25	
7.	Testnevelési Főiskola SE	22	11	2	9	179	188	24	
8.	Csepel SC	22	9	2	11	135	149	20	
9.	Győri Vasas ETO	22	4	7	11	117	141	15	
10.	Győri Textiles	22	6	1	15	137	192	13	
11.	Híradástechnika SK	22	4	4	17	111	175	12	
12.	BRESC	22	2	3	17	93	165	7	Relegated to Nemzeti Bajnokság II

* M: Matches W: Win D: Drawn L: Lost G+: Goals earned G−: Goals got P: Point

== Sources ==
- A magyar sport évkönyve 1965
- magyar bajnokságok - kezitortenelem.hu (in Hungarian)
