= 1977 Nemzeti Bajnokság I (women's handball) =

NB I
- Season: 1977 (27.)
- Champions: Vasas SC (6th title)
- European Cup: Vasas SC
- Cup Winners' Cup: Ferencvárosi TC
- Top goalscorer: Amália Sterbinszky

The 1977 Nemzeti Bajnokság I is the 27th season of the Nemzeti Bajnokság I, Hungary's premier Handball league.

== Final list ==
| # | Team | M | W | D | L | G+ | G− | P | Notes |
|---|---|---|---|---|---|---|---|---|---|
| 1. | Vasas SC | 22 | 22 | 0 | 0 | 477 | 233 | 44 | 1978-79 European Cup 1/8 final |
| 2. | Ferencvárosi TC | 22 | 20 | 0 | 2 | 402 | 289 | 40 | 1978-79 Cup Winners' Cup 1/8 final |
| 3. | Híradótechnika SK | 22 | 14 | 3 | 5 | 285 | 264 | 31 | |
| 4. | Testnevelési Főiskola SE | 22 | 10 | 2 | 10 | 345 | 361 | 22 | |
| 5. | Bakony Vegyész | 22 | 8 | 4 | 10 | 309 | 323 | 20 | |
| 6. | Bp. Spartacus | 22 | 8 | 3 | 11 | 308 | 330 | 19 | |
| 7. | Tatabányai Bányász | 22 | 7 | 5 | 10 | 277 | 305 | 19 | |
| 8. | Pécsi MSC | 22 | 8 | 3 | 11 | 294 | 367 | 19 | |
| 9. | Postás SE | 22 | 6 | 3 | 13 | 294 | 335 | 15 | |
| 10. | Borsodi Bányász | 22 | 6 | 2 | 14 | 348 | 407 | 14 | |
| 11. | Csepel SC | 22 | 5 | 3 | 14 | 317 | 357 | 13 | Relegated to Nemzeti Bajnokság I/B |
| 12. | Goldberger SE | 22 | 3 | 2 | 17 | 301 | 386 | 8 | Relegated to Nemzeti Bajnokság I/B |

* M: Matches W: Win D: Drawn L: Lost G+: Goals earned G−: Goals got P: Point

== Sources ==
- A magyar sport évkönyve 1977
- magyar bajnokságok - kezitortenelem.hu (in Hungarian)
