= 1971 Nemzeti Bajnokság I (women's handball) =

NB I
- Season: 1971 (21.)
- Champions: Ferencvárosi TC (4th title)
- European Cup: Ferencvárosi TC
- Top goalscorer: Piroska Németh

The 1971 Nemzeti Bajnokság I is the 21st season of the Nemzeti Bajnokság I, Hungary's premier Handball league.

== Final list ==
#	Team	M	W	D	L	G+	G−	P	Notes
1.	Ferencvárosi TC	26	23	2	1	351	174	48	1972-73 European Cup 1/8 final
2.	Bakony Vegyész	26	23	0	3	368	202	46	
3.	Vasas SC	26	20	1	5	325	207	41	
4.	Bp. Spartacus	26	15	2	9	297	253	32	
5.	Tatabányai Bányász	26	13	3	10	274	250	29	
6.	Ózdi Kohász	26	11	4	11	278	284	26	
7.	Goldberger SE	26	11	3	12	236	249	25	
8.	Győri Textiles	26	11	3	12	261	302	25	
9.	Csepel SC	26	8	8	10	272	278	24	
10.	Országos Gumiipari SC	26	8	3	15	256	303	19	
11.	Csornai SE	26	6	4	16	240	306	16	
12.	Pécsi Bányász	26	7	1	18	279	329	15	
13.	Békéscsabai Kötött	26	5	0	21	187	352	10	Relegated to Nemzeti Bajnokság I/B
14.	Savaria Cipőgyár	26	3	2	21	248	383	8	Relegated to Nemzeti Bajnokság I/B

* M: Matches W: Win D: Drawn L: Lost G+: Goals earned G−: Goals got P: Point

== Sources ==
- https://www.magyarfutball.hu/hu/tabellak/szezon/1971-1972
- magyar bajnokságok - kezitortenelem.hu (in Hungarian)
