= 1979 Nemzeti Bajnokság I (women's handball) =

NB I
- Season: 1979 (29.)
- Champions: Vasas SC (8th title)
- Top goalscorer: Magdolna Oszvald

The 1979 Nemzeti Bajnokság I is the 29th season of the Nemzeti Bajnokság I, Hungary's premier Handball league.

== Final list ==
#	Team	M	W	D	L	G+	G−	P	Notes
1.	Vasas SC	22	21	1	0	463	255	43	Champions
2.	Bp. Spartacus	22	16	1	5	439	341	33	
3.	Ferencvárosi TC	22	13	4	5	407	347	30	
4.	Tatabányai Bányász	22	13	2	7	339	302	28	
5.	Bakony Vegyész	22	12	2	8	334	355	26	
6.	Győri Textiles	22	10	2	10	318	339	22	
7.	Dunaújvárosi Kohász	22	7	5	10	372	415	19	
8.	BHG SE	22	8	1	13	313	388	17	
9.	Testnevelési Főiskola SE	22	6	3	13	358	381	15	
10.	Csepel SC	22	5	1	16	352	421	11	
11.	Postás SE	22	5	1	16	282	349	11	Relegated to Nemzeti Bajnokság I/B
12.	Pécsi MSC	22	4	1	17	307	391	9	Relegated to Nemzeti Bajnokság I/B

* M: Matches W: Win D: Drawn L: Lost G+: Goals earned G−: Goals got P: Point

== Sources ==
- A magyar sport évkönyve 1979
- magyar bajnokságok - kezitortenelem.hu (in Hungarian)
