= 1974 Nemzeti Bajnokság I (women's handball) =

NB I
- Season: 1974 (24.)
- Champions: Vasas SC (3rd title)
- Top goalscorer: Péterné Takács

The 1974 Nemzeti Bajnokság I is the 24th season of the Nemzeti Bajnokság I, Hungary's premier Handball league.

== Final list ==
#	Team	M	W	D	L	G+	G−	P	Notes
1.	Vasas SC	26	25	0	1	425	216	50	Champions
2.	Bakony Vegyész	26	18	3	5	282	197	39	
3.	Ferencvárosi TC	26	16	2	8	301	242	34	
4.	Csepel SC	26	14	4	8	275	269	32	
5.	Híradótechnika SK	26	11	4	11	269	246	26	
6.	Tatabányai Bányász	26	11	4	11	263	264	26	
7.	Bp. Spartacus	26	12	2	12	287	294	26	
8.	Goldberger SE	26	10	4	12	219	230	24	
9.	Pécsi MSC	26	9	5	12	254	274	23	
10.	Elzett SK	26	8	6	12	232	275	22	
11.	Csornai SE	26	9	3	14	273	321	21	
12.	Sabaria Cipőgyár	26	6	8	12	253	282	20	
13.	Borsodi Bányász	26	7	4	15	230	266	18	Relegated to Nemzeti Bajnokság I/B
14.	Ózdi Kohász	26	1	1	24	204	391	3	Relegated to Nemzeti Bajnokság I/B

* M: Matches W: Win D: Drawn L: Lost G+: Goals earned G−: Goals got P: Point

== Sources ==
- A magyar sport évkönyve 1974
- magyar bajnokságok - kezitortenelem.hu (in Hungarian)
