= 1968 Nemzeti Bajnokság I (women's handball) =

NB I
- Season: 1968 (18.)
- Champions: Ferencvárosi TC (2nd title)
- European Cup: Ferencvárosi TC
- Top goalscorer: Jenőné Schmidt

The 1968 Nemzeti Bajnokság I is the 18th season of the Nemzeti Bajnokság I, Hungary's premier Handball league.

== Final list ==
#	Team	M	W	D	L	G+	G−	P	Notes
1.	Ferencvárosi TC	26	23	1	2	297	165	47	1969-70 European Cup 1/8 final
2.	Pécsi Bányász	26	18	3	5	310	225	39	
3.	Veszprémi Vasas	26	17	4	5	267	193	38	
4.	Ózdi Kohász	26	15	3	8	278	221	33	
5.	Csepel SC	26	13	3	10	254	227	29	
6.	Vasas SC	26	13	2	11	260	239	28	
7.	Bp. Spartacus	26	11	4	11	261	249	26	
8.	Győri Textiles	26	10	5	11	240	235	25	
9.	Bp. Postás	26	10	3	13	235	259	23	
10.	Testnevelési Főiskola SE	26	7	6	13	229	258	20	
11.	Bp. Gumiipari SC	26	9	2	15	188	212	20	
12.	Békéscsabai Kötött	26	7	1	18	204	308	15	Relegated to Nemzeti Bajnokság I/B
13.	Győri Vasas ETO	26	7	0	19	175	273	14	Relegated to Nemzeti Bajnokság I/B
14.	Bp. Vörös Meteor	26	3	1	22	181	315	7	Relegated to Nemzeti Bajnokság I/B

* M: Matches W: Win D: Drawn L: Lost G+: Goals earned G−: Goals got P: Point

== Sources ==
- A magyar sport évkönyve 1969
- magyar bajnokságok - kezitortenelem.hu (in Hungarian)
