= 1975 Nemzeti Bajnokság I (women's handball) =

NB I
- Season: 1975 (25.)
- Champions: Vasas SC (4th title)
- European Cup: Vasas SC
- Cup Winners' Cup: Csepel SC

The 1975 Nemzeti Bajnokság I is the 25th season of the Nemzeti Bajnokság I, Hungary's premier Handball league.

== Final list ==
#	Team	M	W	D	L	G+	G−	P	Notes
1.	Vasas SC	26	22	3	1	490	254	47	1976-77 European Cup round 1
2.	Bakony Vegyész	26	21	2	3	369	259	44	
3.	Ferencvárosi TC	26	19	3	4	352	230	41	
4.	Híradótechnika SK	26	12	6	8	291	250	30	
5.	Goldberger SE	26	14	2	10	273	246	30	
6.	Csepel SC	26	13	2	11	344	338	28	1976-77 Cup Winners' Cup round 1
7.	Csornai SE	26	13	1	12	318	345	27	
8.	Tatabányai Bányász	26	11	1	14	303	307	23	
9.	Elzett SK	26	10	3	13	266	332	23	
10.	Testnevelési Főiskola SE	26	8	5	13	259	323	21	
11.	Pécsi MSC	26	8	4	14	294	303	20	Relegated to Nemzeti Bajnokság I/B
12.	Sabaria SE	26	7	2	17	312	428	16	Relegated to Nemzeti Bajnokság I/B
13.	Bp. Spartacus	26	3	2	21	264	375	8	Relegated to Nemzeti Bajnokság I/B
14.	Békéscsabai Előre Spartacus SC	26	2	2	22	237	382	6	Relegated to Nemzeti Bajnokság I/B

* M: Matches W: Win D: Drawn L: Lost G+: Goals earned G−: Goals got P: Point

== Sources ==
- A magyar sport évkönyve 1975
- magyar bajnokságok - kezitortenelem.hu (in Hungarian)
