= 1976 Nemzeti Bajnokság I (women's handball) =

NB I
- Season: 1976 (26.)
- Champions: Vasas SC (5th title)
- European Cup: Vasas SC
- Cup Winners' Cup: Ferencvárosi TC
- Top goalscorer: Éva Csulikné Bozó

The 1976 Nemzeti Bajnokság I is the 26th season of the Nemzeti Bajnokság I, Hungary's premier Handball league.

== Final list ==
#	Team	M	W	D	L	G+	G−	P	Notes
1.	Vasas SC	22	21	0	1	409	181	42	1977-78 European Cup 1/8 final
2.	Ferencvárosi TC	22	19	1	2	388	264	39	1977-78 Cup Winners' Cup 1/8 final
3.	Bakony Vegyész	22	13	2	7	295	278	28	
4.	Testnevelési Főiskola SE	22	11	1	10	268	252	23	
5.	Híradótechnika SK	22	10	3	9	240	230	23	
6.	Borsodi Bányász	22	11	1	10	242	285	23	
7.	Csepel SC	22	8	4	10	258	277	20	
8.	Tatabányai Bányász	22	8	2	12	220	278	18	
9.	Postás SE	22	8	1	13	233	278	17	
10.	Goldberger SE	22	7	1	14	221	251	15	
11.	Csornai SE	22	5	3	14	213	285	13	Relegated to Nemzeti Bajnokság I/B
12.	Elzett SK	22	1	1	20	223	351	3	Relegated to Nemzeti Bajnokság I/B

* M: Matches W: Win D: Drawn L: Lost G+: Goals earned G−: Goals got P: Point

== Sources ==
- A magyar sport évkönyve 1976
- magyar bajnokságok - kezitortenelem.hu (in Hungarian)
