= 1969 Nemzeti Bajnokság I (women's handball) =

NB I
- Season: 1969 (19.)
- Champions: Ferencvárosi TC (3rd title)
- European Cup: Ferencvárosi TC
- Top goalscorer: Piroska Németh

The 1969 Nemzeti Bajnokság I is the 19th season of the Nemzeti Bajnokság I, Hungary's premier Handball league.

== Final list ==
#	Team	M	W	D	L	G+	G−	P	Notes
1.	Ferencvárosi TC	26	24	1	1	307	160	49	1970-71 European Cup 1/8 final
2.	Bakony Vasas	26	22	2	2	306	205	46	
3.	Vasas SC	26	20	3	3	282	190	43	
4.	Pécsi Bányász	26	19	2	5	311	218	40	
5.	Bp. Spartacus	26	9	6	11	258	268	24	
6.	Ózdi Kohász	26	11	2	13	231	247	24	
7.	Csepel SC	26	8	4	14	242	265	20	
8.	Goldberger SE	26	9	2	15	253	284	20	
9.	Békéscsabai Kötött	26	8	4	14	202	244	20	
10.	Tatabányai Bányász	26	6	6	14	239	277	18	
11.	Győri Textiles	26	8	1	17	244	296	17	
12.	Országos Gumiipari SC	26	6	5	15	195	261	17	
13.	Testnevelési Főiskola SE	26	6	1	19	221	295	13	Relegated to Nemzeti Bajnokság I/B
14.	Bp. Postás	26	6	1	19	208	289	13	Relegated to Nemzeti Bajnokság I/B

* M: Matches W: Win D: Drawn L: Lost G+: Goals earned G−: Goals got P: Point

== Sources ==
- A magyar sport évkönyve 1970
- magyar bajnokságok - kezitortenelem.hu (in Hungarian)
