= 1973 Nemzeti Bajnokság I (women's handball) =

Hungary's premier Handball league

NB I
- Season: 1973 (23.)
- Champions: Vasas SC (2nd title)
- European Cup: Vasas SC
- Top goalscorer: Piroska Németh

The 1973 Nemzeti Bajnokság I is the 23rd season of the Nemzeti Bajnokság I, Hungary's premier Handball league.

== Final list ==
#	Team	M	W	D	L	G+	G−	P	Notes
1.	Vasas SC	26	23	0	3	362	199	46	1974-75 European Cup 1/8 final
2.	Ferencvárosi TC	26	18	1	7	310	224	37	
3.	Bp. Spartacus	26	16	5	5	307	245	37	
4.	Tatabányai Bányász	26	16	0	10	262	220	32	
5.	Bakony Vegyész	26	15	2	9	279	256	32	
6.	Elzett SK	26	9	6	11	245	254	24	
7.	Csepel SC	26	11	1	14	243	253	23	
8.	Csornai SE	26	9	4	13	200	269	22	
9.	Pécsi Bányász	26	9	3	14	257	251	21	
10.	Goldberger SE	26	8	5	13	185	229	21	
11.	Ózdi Kohász	26	9	2	15	218	270	20	
12.	Híradótechnika SK	26	8	3	15	226	247	19	
13.	Győri Textiles	26	7	4	15	194	271	18	Relegated to Nemzeti Bajnokság I/B
14.	Rába ETO	26	5	2	19	187	287	12	Relegated to Nemzeti Bajnokság I/B

* M: Matches W: Win D: Drawn L: Lost G+: Goals earned G−: Goals got P: Point

== Sources ==
- A magyar sport évkönyve 1973
- magyar bajnokságok - kezitortenelem.hu (in Hungarian)
