= 1986 Nemzeti Bajnokság I (women's handball) =

NB I
- Season: 1986 (36.)
- Champions: Bp. Spartacus (9th title)
- European Cup: Bp. Spartacus
- Cup Winners' Cup: Vasas SC
- IHF Cup: Debreceni MVSC
- Top goalscorer: Zsuzsa Bánfi

The 1986 Nemzeti Bajnokság I is the 36th season of the Nemzeti Bajnokság I, Hungary's premier Handball league.

== Final list ==
#	Team	M	W	D	L	G+	G−	P	Notes
1.	Bp. Spartacus	26	20	5	1	619	521	45	1987-88 European Cup 1/8 final
2.	Vasas SC	26	18	3	5	630	485	39	1987-88 Cup Winners' Cup 1/8 final
3.	Debreceni MVSC	26	18	0	8	654	573	36	1987-88 IHF Cup 1/8 final
4.	Építők SC	26	13	8	5	499	476	34	
5.	BHG SE	26	14	2	10	594	578	30	
6.	Győri Richards	26	13	3	10	529	504	29	
7.	Dunaújvárosi Kohász	26	12	3	11	566	566	27	
8.	Ferencvárosi TC	26	10	7	9	560	563	27	
9.	Borsodi Bányász	26	11	3	12	495	519	25	
10.	Békéscsabai Előre Spartacus SC	26	9	3	14	541	540	21	
11.	Tatabányai Bányász	26	8	2	16	574	630	18	
12.	Szegedi Textilművek	26	7	2	17	524	603	16	
13.	Veszprém SE	26	5	1	20	505	615	11	Relegated to Nemzeti Bajnokság I/B
14.	EMG SK	26	2	2	22	489	606	6	Relegated to Nemzeti Bajnokság I/B

* M: Matches W: Win D: Drawn L: Lost G+: Goals earned G−: Goals got P: Point

== Sources ==
- A magyar sport évkönyve 1986
- magyar bajnokságok - kezitortenelem.hu (in Hungarian)
