= 1967 Nemzeti Bajnokság I (women's handball) =

NB I
- Season: 1967 (17.)
- Champions: Bp. Spartacus (7th title)
- Top goalscorer: Klára Horváth

The 1967 Nemzeti Bajnokság I is the 17th season of the Nemzeti Bajnokság I, Hungary's premier Handball league.

== Final list ==
#	Team	M	W	D	L	G+	G−	P	Notes
1.	Bp. Spartacus	26	20	2	4	229	176	42	Champions
2.	Ferencvárosi TC	26	19	1	6	201	119	39	
3.	Vasas SC	26	15	5	6	248	176	35	
4.	Pécsi Bányász	26	14	4	8	236	184	32	
5.	Testnevelési Főiskola SE	26	13	2	11	207	199	28	
6.	Veszprémi Vasas	26	12	1	13	200	200	25	
7.	Győri Textiles	26	11	3	12	167	171	25	
8.	Ózdi Kohász	26	10	4	12	212	229	24	
9.	Csepel SC	26	10	3	13	193	211	23	
10.	Bp. Postás	26	9	4	13	157	174	22	
11.	Bp. Gumiipari SC	26	9	4	13	127	157	22	
12.	Goldberger SE	26	9	2	15	186	229	20	Relegated to Nemzeti Bajnokság I/B
13.	Tatabányai Bányász	26	7	0	19	165	213	14	Relegated to Nemzeti Bajnokság I/B
14.	Híradótechnika SK	26	6	1	19	164	254	13	Relegated to Nemzeti Bajnokság I/B

* M: Matches W: Win D: Drawn L: Lost G+: Goals earned G−: Goals got P: Point

== Sources ==
- A magyar sport évkönyve 1968
- magyar bajnokságok - kezitortenelem.hu (in Hungarian)
