= 1963 Nemzeti Bajnokság I (women's handball) =

NB I
- Season: 1963 (13.)
- Champions: Bp. Spartacus (4th title)
- European Cup: Bp. Spartacus
- Top goalscorer: Magdolna Jóna

The 1963 Nemzeti Bajnokság I is the 13th season of the Nemzeti Bajnokság I, Hungary's premier Handball league.

== Final list ==
#	Team	M	W	D	L	G+	G−	P	Notes
1.	Bp. Spartacus	22	17	2	3	205	124	36	1964-65 European Cup round 1
2.	Ferencvárosi TC	22	16	1	5	147	91	33	
3.	Goldberger SE	22	14	2	6	158	106	30	
4.	Pécsi Bányász	22	13	2	7	168	134	28	
5.	Győri Textiles	22	12	0	10	151	155	24	
6.	VM Közért	22	10	2	10	103	111	22	
7.	Csepel SC	22	10	2	10	113	129	22	
8.	BRESC	22	9	2	11	99	118	20	
9.	Bp. Postás	22	7	3	12	121	121	17	
10.	Győri Vasas ETO	22	7	1	14	102	129	15	
11.	Debreceni Dózsa	22	6	1	15	95	143	13	Relegated to Nemzeti Bajnokság II
12.	Makói VSE	22	1	2	19	96	197	4	Relegated to Nemzeti Bajnokság II

* M: Matches W: Win D: Drawn L: Lost G+: Goals earned G−: Goals got P: Point

== Sources ==
- A magyar sport évkönyve 1964
- magyar bajnokságok - kezitortenelem.hu (in Hungarian)
