= Viktória Koroknai =

Hungarian handball player (born 1979)

Personal information
- Full name: Viktória Koroknai
- Nationality: Hungarian
- Born: 2 June 1979 (age 47) Székesfehérvár, Hungary
- Height: 1.73 m (5 ft 8 in)

Sport
- Sport: Handball
- Position: Left Wing
- Current club: Retired

Senior clubs
- Years: Team
- –2000: Budapesti Spartacus SC
- 2000–2001: Marcai VSZSE
- 2001–2005: Vasas SC
- 2005–2007: Kiskunhalas NKSE
- 2007–2010: Hódmezőváráshelyi NKC
- 2010–2011: Veszprém Barabás KC
- 2012–2013: Haladás VSE

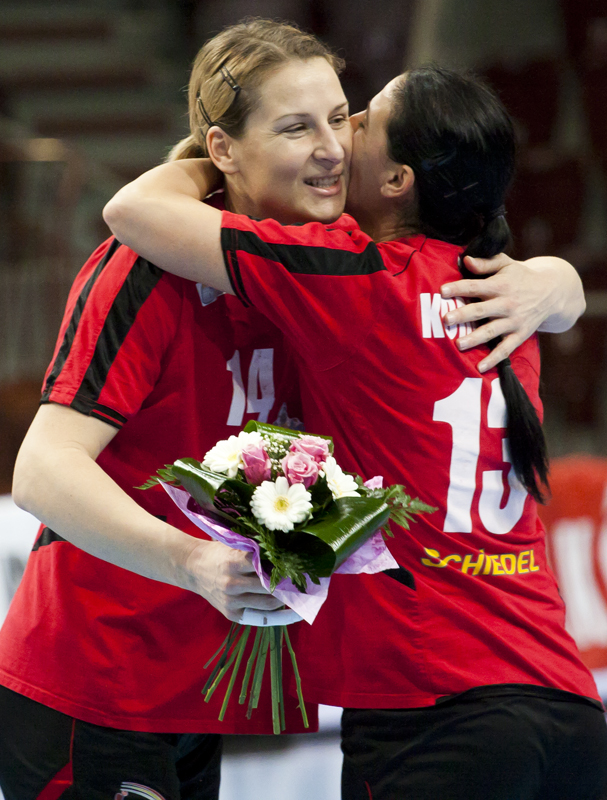
Veszeli Judit (left) and Koroknai Viktória (right)

Viktória Koroknai (born 2 June 1979, in Székesfehérvár) is a retired Hungarian handballer.

She represented Hungary on junior level and was part of the team that finished fourth on the Junior World Championship in 1999.
