= 1960 Nemzeti Bajnokság I (women's handball) =

Handball league season

NB I
- Season: 1960
- Champions: Bp. Spartacus (1st title)
- Top goalscorer: Magdolna Jóna

The 1960 Nemzeti Bajnokság I is the 10th season of the Nemzeti Bajnokság I, Hungary's premier Handball league.

== Final list ==
#	Team	M	W	D	L	G+	G−	P	Notes
1.	Bp. Spartacus	22	19	2	1	197	96	40	Champions
2.	Győri Vasas ETO	22	16	0	6	187	125	32	
3.	Goldberger SE	22	12	3	7	139	119	27	
4.	BRESC	22	11	2	9	105	95	24	
5.	MTK	22	11	1	10	145	124	23	
6.	Testnevelési Főiskola SE	22	8	4	10	112	143	20	
7.	Ózdi VTK	22	8	2	12	123	119	18	
8.	Bp. Vörös Meteor	22	8	1	13	101	115	17	
9.	Ferencvárosi TC	22	8	1	13	90	131	17	
10.	Bp. Postás	22	7	2	13	100	139	16	
11.	Debreceni Kinizsi	22	7	1	14	99	134	15	Relegated to Nemzeti Bajnokság II
12.	VM Közért	22	7	1	14	90	130	15	Relegated to Nemzeti Bajnokság II

* M: Matches W: Win D: Drawn L: Lost G+: Goals earned G−: Goals got P: Point

== Sources ==
- A magyar sport évkönyve 1961
- magyar bajnokságok - kezitortenelem.hu (in Hungarian)
