= 1961 Nemzeti Bajnokság I (women's handball) =

NB I
- Season: 1961
- Champions: Bp. Spartacus (2nd title)
- European Cup: Bp. Spartacus

The 1961 Nemzeti Bajnokság I is the 11th season of the Nemzeti Bajnokság I, Hungary's premier Handball league.

== Final list ==
#	Team	M	W	D	L	G+	G−	P	Notes
1.	Bp. Spartacus	22	20	0	2	213	106	40	1962-63 European Cup 1/8 final
2.	Goldberger SE	22	19	1	2	185	98	39	
3.	Pécsi Bányász	22	13	4	5	148	109	30	
4.	Győri Vasas ETO	22	12	3	7	127	117	27	
5.	BRESC	22	12	3	7	99	94	27	
6.	Bp. Vörös Meteor	22	9	2	11	118	124	20	
7.	Ferencvárosi TC	22	9	1	12	88	98	19	
8.	MTK	22	7	3	12	93	111	17	
9.	Makói VSE	22	7	2	13	134	160	16	
10.	Bp. Postás	22	7	2	13	122	161	16	
11.	Testnevelési Főiskola SE	22	4	2	16	120	174	10	Relegated to Nemzeti Bajnokság II
12.	Ózdi Kohász	22	1	1	20	92	187	3	Relegated to Nemzeti Bajnokság II

* M: Matches W: Win D: Drawn L: Lost G+: Goals earned G−: Goals got P: Point

== Sources ==
- A magyar sport évkönyve 1962
- magyar bajnokságok - kezitortenelem.hu (in Hungarian)
