= List of SC Pick Szeged seasons =

Sport Club Pick Szeged is a professional Hungarian handball club based in Szeged, Hungary.

== Seasons ==
As of 1 June 2019

| Domestic | | | | | | | | | | | | International | | Manager |
| Nemzeti Bajnokság | | | | | | | | | | | Magyar Kupa | International | | Manager |
| Div. | No. | Season | MP | W | D | L | GF–GA | Dif. | Pts. | Pos. | Magyar Kupa | Competition | Result | Manager |
|---|---|---|---|---|---|---|---|---|---|---|---|---|---|---|
| NBI | 44. | 2018–19 | 26 | 25 | 1 | 0 | 907–656 | +251 | 51 | 1st | W | Champions League | QF | |
| NBI | 44. | 2018–19 | lost the Finals, 51–62. | | | | | | | 2nd | W | Champions League | QF | |
