= Hungarian handball league system =

The Hungarian handball league system, or Hungarian handball league pyramid, is a series of interconnected competitions for professional handball clubs in Hungary. The system has a hierarchical format with a promotion and demotion system between competitions at different levels.

== Men ==
=== The tier levels ===
For the 2015–16 season, the Hungarian handball league system is as follows:

Level Clubs	Divisions					
1; 14	Nemzeti Bajnokság I (NB I); 14 clubs – 2 relegations					
2; 28	Nemzeti Bajnokság I/B (NB I/B); West; 14 clubs – 1 promotion, 3 relegations			Nemzeti Bajnokság I/B (NB I/B); East; 14 clubs – 1 promotion, 3 relegations		
3; 72	Nemzeti Bajnokság II (NB II); North-west; 12 clubs – 1p, 3r	Nemzeti Bajnokság II (NB II); South-west; 12 clubs – 1p, 3r	Nemzeti Bajnokság II (NB II); South; 12 clubs – 1p, 3r	Nemzeti Bajnokság II (NB II); North; 12 clubs – 1p, 3r	Nemzeti Bajnokság II (NB II); North-east; 12 clubs – 1p, 3r	Nemzeti Bajnokság II (NB II); South-east; 12 clubs – 1p, 3r
4	Regional divisions					

==== Lower divisions ====
For the 2015–16 season, the lower divisions for each of the Counties is as follows:

County	Level 4	Level 5
Bács-Kiskun	Bács-Kiskun megyei (11 teams)	None
Tolna	Bács-Kiskun megyei (11 teams)	None
Baranya	Baranya megyei (9 teams)	None
Békés	Békés megyei (7 teams)	None
Budapest	Budapest I (12 teams)	Budapest I/A (12 teams)
Csongrád	Csongrád megyei (8 teams)	None
Győr-Moson-Sopron	Győr-Moson-Sopron megyei (11 teams)	None
Komárom-Esztergom	Győr-Moson-Sopron megyei (11 teams)	None
Vas	Győr-Moson-Sopron megyei (11 teams)	None
Hajdú-Bihar	Hajdú-Bihar megyei (6 teams)	None
Heves	Heves megyei (4 teams)	None
Nógrád	Heves megyei (4 teams)	None
Jász-Nagykun-Szolnok	Jász-Nagykun-Szolnok megyei (5 teams)	None
Pest	Pest megyei A (11 teams)	Pest megyei B (12 teams)
Szabolcs-Szatmár-Bereg	Szabolcs-Szatmár-Bereg megyei (6 teams)	None
Borsod-Abaúj-Zemplén	Szabolcs-Szatmár-Bereg megyei (6 teams)	None
Veszprém	Veszprém-Fejér megyei (12 teams)	None
Fejér	Veszprém-Fejér megyei (12 teams)	None
Zala	Zala megyei (8 teams)	None
Somogy	Zala megyei (8 teams)	None

=== Evolution of the Hungarian men's handball league system ===
Tier\Years	1957–67	1968–
1	Nemzeti Bajnokság I (NB I)	
2	Nemzeti Bajnokság II (NB II)	Nemzeti Bajnokság I/B (NB I/B)
3	Lower	Nemzeti Bajnokság II (NB II)
4	Lower	Lower
5	Lower	Lower

== Women ==
=== The tier levels ===
For the 2015–16 season, the Hungarian handball league system is as follows:

Level Clubs	Divisions					
1; 12	Nemzeti Bajnokság I (NB I); 12 clubs – 2 relegations					
2; 28	Nemzeti Bajnokság I/B (NB I/B); West; 14 clubs – 1 promotion, 3 relegations			Nemzeti Bajnokság I/B (NB I/B); East; 14 clubs – 1 promotion, 3 relegations		
3; 67	Nemzeti Bajnokság II (NB II); North-west; 10 clubs – 1p, 1r	Nemzeti Bajnokság II (NB II); South-west; 12 clubs – 1p, 3r	Nemzeti Bajnokság II (NB II); North; 12 clubs – 1p, 3r	Nemzeti Bajnokság II (NB II); South; 11 clubs – 1p, 2r	Nemzeti Bajnokság II (NB II); North-east; 11 clubs – 1p, 2r	Nemzeti Bajnokság II (NB II); South-east; 11 clubs – 1p, 2r
4	Regional divisions					

==== Lower divisions ====
For the 2015–16 season, the lower divisions for each of the Counties is as follows:

County	Level 4	Level 5
Bács-Kiskun	Bács-Kiskun megyei (11 teams)	None
Baranya	Baranya megyei (9 teams)	None
Békés	Békés megyei (11 teams)	None
Borsod-Abaúj-Zemplén	Borsod-Abaúj-Zemplén megyei (6 teams)	None
Budapest	Budapest I (2 groups of 8 teams)	Budapest I/A (2 groups of 8 teams)
Csongrád	Csongrád megyei (10 teams)	None
Fejér	Fejér megyei (8 teams)	None
Győr-Moson-Sopron	Győr-Moson-Sopron megyei A (8 teams)	Győr-Moson-Sopron megyei B (7 teams)
Hajdú-Bihar	Hajdú-Bihar megyei (9 teams)	None
Jász-Nagykun-Szolnok	Jász-Nagykun-Szolnok megyei (10 teams)	None
Komárom-Esztergom	Komárom-Esztergom megyei (5 teams)	None
Pest	Pest megyei A (9 teams)	Pest megyei B (9 teams)
Nógrád	None	Pest megyei B (9 teams)
Somogy	Somogy megyei (6 teams)	None
Szabolcs-Szatmár-Bereg	Szabolcs-Szatmár-Bereg megyei (10 teams)	None
Tolna	Tolna megyei (8 teams)	None
Veszprém	Veszprém megyei (11 teams)	None
Vas	Veszprém megyei (11 teams)	None
Zala	Zala megyei (6 teams)	None

=== Evolution of the Hungarian women's handball league system ===
Tier\Years	1957–67	1968–
1	Nemzeti Bajnokság I (NB I)	
2	Nemzeti Bajnokság II (NB II)	Nemzeti Bajnokság I/B (NB I/B)
3	Lower	Nemzeti Bajnokság II (NB II)
4	Lower	Lower
5	Lower	Lower

== Cup competitions ==
- Magyar Kupa (men's handball) (Magyar Kupa férfi)
- Magyar Kupa (women's handball) (Magyar Kupa női)
