= 1966 Nemzeti Bajnokság I (women's handball) =

NB I
- Season: 1966 (16.)
- Champions: Ferencvárosi TC (1st title)
- European Cup: Ferencvárosi TC
- Top goalscorer: Klára Horváth

The 1966 Nemzeti Bajnokság I is the 16th season of the Nemzeti Bajnokság I, Hungary's premier Handball league.

== Final list ==
#	Team	M	W	D	L	G+	G−	P	Notes
1.	Ferencvárosi TC	26	23	1	2	209	69	47	1967-68 European Cup round 1
2.	Bp. Spartacus	26	20	2	4	245	141	42	
3.	Testnevelési Főiskola SE	26	20	1	5	223	153	41	
4.	Pécsi Bányász	26	14	2	10	189	152	30	
5.	Goldberger SE	26	14	2	10	180	158	30	
6.	Ózdi Kohász	26	14	2	10	202	183	30	
7.	Győri Textiles	26	13	3	10	171	170	29	
8.	Csepel SC	26	13	1	12	182	160	27	
9.	Bp. Gumiipari SC	26	9	5	12	132	159	23	
10.	Bp. Postás	26	7	5	14	157	166	19	
11.	Veszprémi Vasas	26	7	4	15	138	187	18	
12.	VM Közért	26	7	2	17	151	232	16	Relegated to Nemzeti Bajnokság II
13.	Győri Vasas ETO	26	2	3	21	95	184	7	Relegated to Nemzeti Bajnokság II
14.	Makói VSE	26	2	1	23	119	279	5	Relegated to Nemzeti Bajnokság II

* M: Matches W: Win D: Drawn L: Lost G+: Goals earned G−: Goals got P: Point

== Sources ==
- A magyar sport évkönyve 1967
- magyar bajnokságok - kezitortenelem.hu (in Hungarian)
