= 1965 Nemzeti Bajnokság I (women's handball) =

NB I
- Season: 1965 (15.)
- Champions: Bp. Spartacus (6th title)
- European Cup: Bp. Spartacus
- Top goalscorer: Elemérné Bakó

The 1965 Nemzeti Bajnokság I is the 15th season of the Nemzeti Bajnokság I, Hungary's premier Handball league.

== Final list ==
#	Team	M	W	D	L	G+	G−	P	Notes
1.	Bp. Spartacus	26	21	2	3	216	125	44	1966-67 European Cup round 1
2.	Goldberger SE	26	18	3	5	196	140	39	
3.	Pécsi Bányász	26	16	2	8	224	152	34	
4.	Bp. Postás	26	16	2	8	178	144	34	
5.	Ferencvárosi TC	26	15	1	10	176	152	31	
6.	Testnevelési Főiskola SE	26	14	2	10	199	201	30	
7.	VM Közért	26	14	1	11	149	129	29	
8.	Győri Textiles	26	10	6	10	158	171	26	
9.	Csepel SC	26	9	3	14	168	169	21	
10.	Ózdi Kohász	26	9	1	16	124	165	20	
11.	Győri Vasas ETO	26	8	4	14	131	149	19	
12.	Vasas SC	26	8	2	16	117	161	18	Relegated to Nemzeti Bajnokság II
13.	Híradástechnika SK	26	6	1	19	146	211	13	Relegated to Nemzeti Bajnokság II
14.	Tatabányai Bányász	26	2	2	22	109	216	6	Relegated to Nemzeti Bajnokság II

* M: Matches W: Win D: Drawn L: Lost G+: Goals earned G−: Goals got P: Point

== Sources ==
- A magyar sport évkönyve 1966
- magyar bajnokságok - kezitortenelem.hu (in Hungarian)
