= 1985–86 Women's IHF Cup =

European handball tournament

The 1985–86 Women's IHF Cup was the fifth edition of the competition. It was contested by fifteen teams instead of the eighteen of the previous edition, so the preliminary round was suppressed and the defending champion's representative was granted a bye to the quarter-finals. Like the one year before, the final confronted the East German and Hungarian teams, with the same outcome; 2-times European champions HC Leipzig overcame in its arena Debreceni VSC's 6 goals first-leg win to win its fourth IHF title.

== First round ==
Team #1	Agg.	Team #2	1st match	2nd match
Bordeaux (France)	37–64	(Norway) Gjerpen IF	22–28	15–36
Neerpelt (Belgium)	19–78	(Hungary) Debreceni	8–34	11–44
Fünfhaus (Austria)	60–45	(Turkey) Altinordu	36–21	24–24
Hernani (Spain)	27–45	(Sweden) Tyresö	14–24	13–21
Ariosto Ferrara (Italy)	26–77	(Czech Republic) Druzstevnik Topolniky	12–33	14–44
Chimistul Rm. Vâlcea (Romania)	46–46 (a)	(Germany) Lützellinden	28–22	18–24
Leipzig (East Germany)	Bye			
Lokomotiva Zagreb (Socialist Federal Republic of Yugoslavia)	44–48	(Bulgaria) Georgi Dimitrov	29–20	15–28

== Quarter-finals ==
Team #1	Agg.	Team #2	1st match	2nd match
Gjerpen (Norway)	50–54	(Hungary) Debreceni	26–25	24–29
Fünfhaus (Austria)	27–45	(Sweden) Tyresö	11–21	16–24
Druzstevnik Topolniky (Czech Republic)	44–43	(Germany) Lützellinden	23–24	21–19
Leipzig (East Germany)	38–35	(Bulgaria) Georgi Dimitrov	22–12	16–23

== Semifinals ==
Team #1	Agg.	Team #2	1st match	2nd match
Debreceni (Hungary)	52–39	(Sweden) Tyresö	27–19	25–20
Druzstevnik Topolniky (Czech Republic)	32–37	(East Germany) Leipzig	19–16	13–21

== Final ==
Team #1	Agg.	Team #2	1st match	2nd match
Debreceni (Hungary)	37–41	(East Germany) Leipzig	22–16	15–25
