= 2000–01 Nemzeti Bajnokság I (women's handball) =

NB I
- Season: 2000-01 (50.)

The 2000–01 Nemzeti Bajnokság I is the 50th season of the Nemzeti Bajnokság I, Hungary's premier Handball league.

== Team information ==
Location of teams in 2000-01 Nemzeti Bajnokság I

The following 12 clubs compete in the NB I during the 2000–01 season:

Team	Location	Arena	Capacity
Békéscsaba	Békéscsaba	Városi Sportcsarnok	2,300
Bp. Spartacus	Budapest	Spartacus sporttelep	
Debreceni VSC	Debrecen	Hódos Imre Sportcsarnok	1,800
Dunaferr	Dunaújváros	Dunaferr Sportcsarnok	1,200
Fehérvár KC	Székesfehérvár	KÖFÉM Sportcsarnok	1,000
Ferencváros	Budapest	Kőbányai úti sportcsarnok	1,300
Győri ETO	Győr	Magvassy Mihály Sportcsarnok	2,800
Kiskunhalas	Kiskunhalas	Általános Művelődési Központ	500
Marcali	Marcali	Városi Sportcsarnok	500
Orosháza	Orosháza		
Vasas	Budapest	Vasas Sportcsarnok	1,500
Vác	Vác	Városi Sportcsarnok	620

== Regular season (Alapszakasz) ==
	Team	Pld	W	D	L	GF	GA	Diff	Pts	Qualification or relegation
1	Dunaferr SE	22	20	1	1	648	446	+202	41	2001-02 EHF Champions League Group Stage
2	Herz-FTC	22	20	0	2	751	470	+281	40	2001-02 EHF Champions League Round 2
3	Győri Graboplast ETO KC	22	17	0	5	690	519	+171	34	2001-02 EHF Cup round 3
4	Cornexi-Alcoa	22	12	3	7	610	564	+46	27	2001-02 EHF Cup round 2
5	DVSC-Valdor	22	10	4	8	564	572	−6	24	2001-02 EHF Cup Winners' Cup round 3 ^{1}
6	Vasas-Hungaroweiss	22	10	4	8	568	548	+20	24	
7	Bp. Kőbányai Spartacus	22	8	2	12	518	621	−103	18	
8	Synergon SE Vác	22	7	2	12	613	666	−53	16	
9	Békéscsabai Előre NK	22	4	5	13	522	649	−127	13	
10	AGRO SE Orosháza	22	5	2	15	508	556	−48	12	Relegation to Nemzeti Bajnokság I/B ^{2}
11	Kiskunhalas NKSE	22	6	0	16	439	571	−132	12	Relegation to Nemzeti Bajnokság I/B
12	Marcali VSZSE-Lénia	22	1	1	20	452	700	−248	3	Relegation to Nemzeti Bajnokság I/B

Pld - Played; W - Won; D - Drawn; L - Lost; GF - Goals for; GA - Goals against; Diff - Difference; Pts - Points.

^{1} Since Herz-FTC, winners of 2000–01 Magyar Kupa, was qualified for the 2001-02 EHF Champions League, losing cup finalists DVSC-Valdor earned a spot in the third round of the 2001-02 EHF Cup Winners' Cup.

== Season statistics ==
=== Top goalscorers ===
Rank	Player	Team	Goals
1	(Hungary) Ágnes Farkas	Herz-FTC	

=== Number of teams by counties ===
	County (megye)	No. teams	Teams
1	Budapest	3	Bp. Spartacus, Ferencváros and Vasas
2	Békés	2	Békéscsaba and Orosháza
2	Fejér	2	Dunaferr and Fehérvár KC
4	Bács-Kiskun	1	Kiskunhalas
4	Hajdú-Bihar	1	Debreceni VSC
4	Győr-Moson-Sopron	1	Győri ETO
4	Pest	1	Vác
4	Somogy	1	Marcali

== Sources ==
- magyar bajnokságok - kezitortenelem.hu (in Hungarian)
