= 1951 Nemzeti Bajnokság I (women's handball) =

- League: Nemzeti Bajnokság I
- Sport: Team handball

League
- League champions: Csepeli Vasas SK

Nemzeti Bajnokság I seasons
- 1952 →

The 1951 Nemzeti Bajnokság I was the first ever edition of the top level championship in the Hungarian team handball for women. Four teams contested for the title and Csepeli Vasas SK were declared the inaugural champions.

== Results ==
=== Final standings ===
Rank	Club	Pld	W	D	L	GF	GA	GD	Pts
1	Csepeli Vasas SK (C)	3	2	0	1	13	10	+3	4
2	Budapest Vörös Meteor Közért	3	2	0	1	12	10	+2	4
3	Debreceni Építők	3	1	0	2	10	9	+1	2
4	Békéscsabai Pamutszövő	3	1	0	2	9	15	–6	2

=== List of champions ===
The following players have played for Csepel Vasas SK and were crowned as the first ever Hungarian champions:

- Mária Babér
- Mária Bognár
- Ilona Fekete
- Magda Kiss
- Júlia Mácsai
- Ilona Pápay
- Éva Pischni
- Mária Schütz

Head Coach: Andor Várady
