= 1952 Nemzeti Bajnokság I (women's handball) =

1951 Nemzeti Bajnokság I
- League: Nemzeti Bajnokság I
- Sport: Team handball

League
- League champions: Vörös Meteor FÜSZÉRT

Nemzeti Bajnokság I seasons
- ← 1951 1953 →

The 1952 Nemzeti Bajnokság I was the second season of the top level championship in the Hungarian team handball for women. Vörös Meteor completed their three match programme without defeat and won the title.

== Results ==
=== Final standings ===
Rank	Club	Pld	W	D	L	GF	GA	GD	Pts
1	Vörös Meteor FÜSZÉRT (C)	3	2	1	0	15	4	+11	5
2	Csepeli Vasas SK	3	2	0	1	9	12	–3	4
3	Vörös Lobogó Keltex	3	0	2	1	7	8	–1	2
4	Békéscsabai Pamutszövő	3	0	1	2	10	17	–7	1
