= 1962 Nemzeti Bajnokság I (women's handball) =

NB I
- Season: 1962
- Champions: Bp. Spartacus (3rd title)
- European Cup: Bp. Spartacus

The 1962 Nemzeti Bajnokság I is the 12th season of the Nemzeti Bajnokság I, Hungary's premier Handball league.

== Final list ==
#	Team	M	W	D	L	G+	G−	P	Notes
1.	Bp. Spartacus	22	18	3	1	204	102	39	1963-64 European Cup round 1
2.	Goldberger SE	22	15	2	5	140	93	32	
3.	VM Közért	22	12	4	6	126	121	28	
4.	Ferencvárosi TC	22	13	1	8	147	121	27	
5.	Pécsi Bányász	22	12	2	8	164	148	26	
6.	Bp. Postás	22	10	2	10	122	106	22	
7.	Győri Vasas ETO	22	8	2	12	132	137	18	
8.	BRESC	22	8	2	12	105	120	18	
9.	Makói VSE	22	7	4	11	129	174	18	
10.	Csepel SC	22	5	4	13	111	138	14	
11.	MTK	22	5	2	15	77	132	12	Relegated to Nemzeti Bajnokság II
12.	Bp. Vörös Meteor	22	4	2	13	114	179	10	Relegated to Nemzeti Bajnokság II

* M: Matches W: Win D: Drawn L: Lost G+: Goals earned G−: Goals got P: Point

== Sources ==
- A magyar sport évkönyve 1963
- magyar bajnokságok - kezitortenelem.hu (in Hungarian)
