= 1985–86 IHF Women's Cup Winners' Cup =

The 1985–86 IHF Women's Cup Winners' Cup was the tenth edition of IHF's competition for European women's handball national cup champions. 20 teams entered the competition, three less than in the previous edition.

3-times European Cup champion Radnički Belgrade defeated VfL Engelskirchen in its sixth consecutive appearance in a European final, to win the first of its three Cup Winners' Cups to date. It was the last of 5 consecutive trophies won by Yugoslav teams, a competition record which hasn't been matched as of 2013. On the other hand, Engelskirchen was the first club from the Western Bloc to reach the competition's final.

== Results ==
(Denmark) Rødovre HK	w/o
(Belgium) United Tongeren	15	12	27	(Iceland) Valur
(Iceland) Valur	18	20	38	(Denmark) Rødovre HK (a)	22	19	41
(Norway) Sverresborg IF	17	24	41
(Norway) Sverresborg IF	23	20	43
(Israel) Hapoel Ashdod	13	13	26	(Switzerland) Fides St. Gallen	9	17	26
(Switzerland) Fides St. Gallen	24	22	46	(Denmark) Rødovre HK	15	19	34
(West Germany) VfL Engelskirchen	18	23	41
(Netherlands) Swift Roermond	16	11	27
(West Germany) VfL Engelskirchen	16	17	33
(West Germany) VfL Engelskirchen	31	27	58
(Italy) Cassano Magnago	21	21	42
(Bulgaria) Sportist Kremikovtsi	25	20	45
(Italy) Cassano Magnago	20	26	46
(West Germany) VfL Engelskirchen	25	23	48
(France) ASU Lyon	23	16	39	(Socialist Federal Republic of Yugoslavia) Radnički Belgrade	24	27	51
(Spain) Mades Onda (a)	22	19	39	(Spain) Mades Onda	13	19	32
(Socialist Federal Republic of Yugoslavia) Radnički Belgrade	27	33	60
(Socialist Federal Republic of Yugoslavia) Radnički Belgrade	28	24	52
(Romania) Terom Iaşi	17	25	42
(Romania) Terom Iaşi	39	26	65
(Turkey) Arcelik Istanbul	12	11	23	(Austria) Admira Landhaus	17	20	37
(Austria) Admira Landhaus	27	30	57	(Socialist Federal Republic of Yugoslavia) Radnički Belgrade	27	16	43
(Soviet Union) Avtomobilist Baku	20	19	29
(Soviet Union) Avtomobilist Baku	30	18	48
(Czechoslovakia) Štart Bratislava	21	25	46
(Soviet Union) Avtomobilist Baku	34	24	58
(East Germany) Berliner TSC	26	25	51
(Hungary) Spartacus Budapest	23	25	48
(East Germany) Berliner TSC	23	32	55
