= Sarah Khouiled =

Algerian handball player (born 1992)

Personal information
- Nationality: Algerian, Hungarian
- Born: 8 December 1992 (age 33)
- Height: 1.71 m (5 ft 7 in)

Sport
- Sport: Handball
- Position: Left wing
- Current club: Retired

Senior clubs
- Years: Team
- 2010–2012: Veszprém Barabás KC
- 2012–2013: Nyíradonyi VVTK
- 2013–2014: Szeged KKSE
- 2014–2015: Dunaújváros
National team
Years	Team	Apps	(Gls)
2012	Algeria	5	(2)

Sarah Khouiled (born 8 December 1992) is a retired Algerian international team handball player.

Khouleid was born in Hungary to an Algerian father and a Hungarian mother; she holds both Algerian and Hungarian citizenship. A product of Győri ETO KC's youth system (2006–2009), Khouiled made her senior debut in Veszprém Barabás KC in 2010. With her performances she drew the attention of the Algerian Handball Federation and received an invitation in national team for the African Handball Championship in 2012, where Algeria eventually finished fourth. She also represented Algeria at the 2013 World Women's Handball Championship in Serbia, where the Algerian team placed 22nd. She retired from handball in 2015, since then she works as a personal trainer.
