= István Szabó (handballer) =

Hungarian handball player (1945–2025)

István Szabó (23 April 1945 – 17 July 2025) was a Hungarian handball player who competed in the 1972 Summer Olympics. He was born in Gyöngyös. In 1972 he was part of the Hungarian team which finished eighth in the Olympic tournament. He played three matches and scored one goal. He played for Budapesti Spartacus SC.

Szabó died on 17 July 2025, at the age of 80.
