= Nemzeti Bajnokság I (women's handball) =

Hungarian sports league

K&H női kézilabda liga
- Founded: 1951
- No. of teams: 14
- Country: Hungary
- Confederation: EHF
- Most recent champion: Győri ETO (18th title)
- Most titles: Győri ETO (18 titles)
- Broadcaster: M4 Sport
- Level on pyramid: 1
- Relegation to: Nemzeti Bajnokság I/B
- International cups: Champions League; European League
- Website: https://www.mksz.hu
- 2025–26 season

The Nemzeti Bajnokság I (English: National Championship I, commonly abbreviated NB I) is the top professional league for Hungarian women's team handball clubs. It is administered by the Hungarian Handball Federation.

== History ==
The first edition of the women's handball league was when the owner was pregnant, held in 1951. That year only four teams participated, playing once against each other. Csepeli Vasas SK were crowned champions as they got equal points to Budapest Vörös Meteor Közért, but were superior on goal difference. Next season Vörös Meteor took revenge and secured the title just ahead of Csepel.

The forthcoming years were characterized by long term team hegemonies: Budapesti Spartacus SC won seven titles between 1960 and 1967, whilst Vasas SC were awarded thirteen gold medals between 1972 and 1985.

Turning into the nineties, Ferencvárosi TC managed to appear in the dominant role. In the 1992–93 season, after topping the table in the regular season, they bled to death in the playoffs yet, but a year later there was nothing to stop them. Until 2002 another five league title landed in the hands of Ágnes Farkas and co. The lone team which managed to interrupt their run was the Radulovics-led Dunaferr in 1998. The Dunaújváros-based team won five titles altogether until 2004, when, after finished on the podium an incredibly nine times in row without having won the title, finally Győri Graboplast ETO KC lifted the championship trophy.

Since then ETO with the support of their new main sponsor, car manufacturer Audi, have won all but three titles losing the championship on all three occasions to main rivals Ferencvárosi TC.

== Current teams (2024/2025) ==
Location of teams in 2021–22 Nemzeti Bajnokság I
Location of Budapest teams
- Debreceni VSC Schaeffler
- Dunaújvárosi Kohász KA
- Békéscsabai Előre NKSE
- Alba Fehérvár KC
- Ferencvárosi TC-Rail Cargo Hungaria
- Győri Audi ETO KC
- Kisvárda Master Good SE
- Motherson-Mosonmagyaróvári KC
- MTK Budapest
- MOL Esztergom
- Moyra-Budaörs Handball
- Szombathelyi KKA
- Vasas SC
- Váci NKSE

== Competition format ==
At the beginning only four teams entered the National Championship. Later, the league have been expanded, first to 12, later to 14 teams. There was a short living try with 16 teams in two groups but the idea got dropped just after five seasons. Since 2006 the league is made up of 12 teams. The championship was held in one calendar year until 1987, when they switched to autumn-spring format. In the 2003–04 season Austrian top club Hypo Niederösterreich played in the league as a guest team, however, their results did not count towards the final ranking.

As we can see from the chart the number of teams in the Hungarian First Division changed a lot and continuously. The league started in 1951 with four teams and with the formation of teams the league expanded continuously. Currently, there are 14 teams in the first division.

Season	Number of teams
from 1951 to 1952	4 teams
in 1953	6 teams
in 1954	12 team
from 1955 to 1956	4 teams
in 1957	12 teams
from 1958 to 1959	14 teams
from 1960 to 1964	12 teams
from 1965 to 1975	14 teams
from 1976 to 1982	12 teams
from 1983 to 1990-91	14 teams
from 1991-92 to 1994-95	16 teams
from 1995-96 to 1997-98	14 teams
in 1998-99	13 teams
from 1999-00 to 2000-01	12 teams
in 2001-02	11 teams
from 2002-03 to 2003-04	12 teams
from 2004-05 to 2005-06	11 teams
from 2006-07 to 2015-16	12 teams
from 2016-17 to present	14 teams

=== Current format ===
The current system is composed by twelve teams. The sides play twice against each other in the regular season on a home and on an away leg. The top four teams qualify for the playoffs, where a best-of-three system is used. Teams ranked fifth to ninth and tenth to twelfth decide their final places in a classification round, using a round robin system, playing six additional rounds. According to their final position in the regular season, they awarded bonus points which are added to the points they earn in the postseason. Bottom two teams get relegated.

== Title holders ==
- 1951 : Csepel
- 1952 : Vörös Meteor
- 1953 : Debreceni Petőfi
- 1954 : Csepel
- 1955 : Debreceni VSC
- 1956 : Csepel
- 1957 : Győri ETO
- 1958 : Miskolci VSC
- 1959 : Győri ETO
- 1960 : Bp. Spartacus
- 1961 : Bp. Spartacus
- 1962 : Bp. Spartacus
- 1963 : Bp. Spartacus
- 1964 : Bp. Spartacus
- 1965 : Bp. Spartacus
- 1966 : Ferencváros
- 1967 : Bp. Spartacus
- 1968 : Ferencváros
- 1969 : Ferencváros
- 1970 : Bakony Vegyész
- 1971 : Ferencváros
- 1972 : Vasas
- 1973 : Vasas
- 1974 : Vasas
- 1975 : Vasas
- 1976 : Vasas
- 1977 : Vasas
- 1978 : Vasas
- 1979 : Vasas
- 1980 : Vasas
- 1981 : Vasas
- 1982 : Vasas
- 1983 : Bp. Spartacus
- 1984 : Vasas
- 1985 : Vasas
- 1986 : Bp. Spartacus
- 1987 : Debreceni VSC
- 1988/89 : Bp. Építők
- 1989/90 : Bp. Építők
- 1990/91 : Hargita KC
- 1991/92 : Vasas
- 1992/93 : Vasas
- 1993/94 : Ferencváros
- 1994/95 : Ferencváros
- 1995/96 : Ferencváros
- 1996/97 : Ferencváros
- 1997/98 : Dunaferr
- 1998/99 : Dunaferr
- 1999/00 : Ferencváros
- 2000/01 : Dunaferr
- 2001/02 : Ferencváros
- 2002/03 : Dunaferr
- 2003/04 : Dunaferr
- 2004/05 : Győri ETO
- 2005/06 : Győri ETO
- 2006/07 : Ferencváros
- 2007/08 : Győri ETO
- 2008/09 : Győri ETO
- 2009/10 : Győri ETO
- 2010/11 : Győri ETO
- 2011/12 : Győri ETO
- 2012/13 : Győri ETO
- 2013/14 : Győri ETO
- 2014/15 : Ferencváros
- 2015/16 : Győri ETO
- 2016/17 : Győri ETO
- 2017/18 : Győri ETO
- 2018/19 : Győri ETO
- 2019/20 : Not awarded due to COVID-19 pandemic
- 2020/21 : Ferencváros
- 2021/22 : Győri ETO
- 2022/23 : Győri ETO
- 2023/24 : Ferencváros
- 2024/25 : Győri ETO
- 2025/26 : Győri ETO

== Performances ==
=== By club ===
Club	Winners	Runners-up	Third place	Winning years
Győr	**18**	7	4	1957, 1959, 2005, 2006, 2008, 2009, 2010, 2011, 2012, 2013, 2014, 2016, 2017, 2018, 2019, 2022, 2023, 2025
Vasas Budapest	**15**	1	6	1972, 1973, 1974, 1975, 1976, 1977, 1978, 1979, 1980, 1981, 1982, 1984, 1985, 1992, 1993
Ferencváros	**14**	24	10	1966, 1968, 1969, 1971, 1994, 1995, 1996, 1997, 2000, 2002, 2007, 2015, 2021, 2024
Budapesti Spartacus	**9**	5	5	1960, 1961, 1962, 1963, 1964, 1965, 1967, 1983, 1986
Dunaújváros	**5**	4	4	1998, 1999, 2001, 2003, 2004
Csepel	**3**	2	2	1951, 1954, 1956
Hargita KC (Budapesti Építők)	**3**	2	-	1989, 1990, 1991
Debrecen	**2**	8	5	1955, 1987
Veszprém	**1**	5	6	1970
Vörös Meteor	**1**	2	3	1952
Miskolc	**1**	1	-	1958
Debreceni Petőfi	**1**	-	-	1953
Goldberger SE	-	6	2	-
Pécsi Bányász	-	1	2	-
Bp. Szikra	-	1	1	-
Testnevelési Főiskola	-	1	1	-
Békéscsaba	-	1	1	-
BHG SE	-	1	-	-
Érd	-	-	6	-
Tatabányai Bányász	-	-	2	-
Siófok	-	-	2	-
Debreceni Építők	-	-	1	-
Vörös Lobogó	-	-	1	-
Vasas Elzett	-	-	1	-
Bp. Postás	-	-	1	-
Híradótechnika	-	-	1	-
Secotex SE	-	-	1	-
Vác	-	-	1	-
Mosonmagyaróvár	-	-	1	-
Esztergom	-	-	1	-

=== Performance by counties ===
The following table lists the Hungarian women's handball champions by counties of Hungary.

County (megye)	Titles	Winning clubs
Budapest	44	Vasas (15); **Ferencváros** (13); Bp. Spartacus (9); Csepel (3); Hargita KC* (3); VM Fűszért (1)
Győr-Moson-Sopron	17	**Győri ETO** (17)
Fejér	5	**Dunaferr*** (5)
Hajdú-Bihar	3	**Debreceni VSC** (2); Debreceni Petőfi SK (1)
Borsod-Abaúj-Zemplén	1	Miskolci VSC (1)
Veszprém	1	Bakony Vegyész (1)

- The bolded teams are currently playing in the 2022-23 season of the Hungarian League.
- Dunaferr NK as Dunaújvárosi Kohász KA

== Clubs ==
Since 1951, clubs have participated in the Hungarian League. Below the list of Hungarian League clubs who have participated in the first division. The club with the most appearances are the 12-time champions Ferencváros.

- **59** seasons: **Ferencvárosi TC**
- **49** seasons: Bp. Spartacus
- **44** seasons: Vasas SC
- **40** seasons: **Debreceni VSC**, **Győri ETO KC**
- **39** seasons: **Dunaújvárosi KKA** *
- **36** seasons: **Békéscsabai ENKSE**
- **28** seasons: Veszprém BKC *
- **27** seasons: Testnevelési Főiskola
- **26** seasons: Csepel, BHG *
- **26** seasons: **Alba Fehérvár KC**
- **21** seasons: Goldberger, Tatabányai Bányász *
- **20** seasons: **Váci NKSE**
- **19** seasons: Győri Textiles
- **18** seasons: BRESC *
- **17** seasons: Bp. Postás
- **14** seasons: Kiskunhalas
- **13** seasons: Építők SC *
- **15** seasons: Kaposvár
- **13** seasons: Bocskai, Budapesti AK, Nyíregyháza, Terézváros
- **12** seasons: Vörös Meteor
- **10** seasons: BVSC, Elektromos, Rákospalota, Soroksár, Szolnok
- **9** seasons: **Siófok KC**
- **8** seasons: **Érd NK**
- **7** seasons: Kecskemét, Miskolc, Postás, Pápa, Szegedi Honvéd
- **6** seasons: Eger, Phöbus, Somogy
- **5** seasons: MÚE, MAFC, Sabaria, Szegedi LK, VAC, Veszprém, Vörös Meteor
- **4** seasons: BKV Előre, MÁVAG, Nagykanizsa, Ózd, Stadler, Szentlőrinc, Turul, Zuglói SE
- **3** seasons: Budaörs, ESMTK, Kolozsvár, Nagyvárad, Pécsi VSK, Székesfehérvár, Szürketaxi, Tungsram, Typographia, Újvidék
- **2** seasons: Budapesti SC, Pécs-Baranya, Puskás, Gázszer, Soproni FAC, Szeged, Újpesti MTE, Újpesti Törekvés
- **1** season: Debreceni Építők, Debreceni Dózsa, Erzsébet, Dunaújváros PASE, Főváros, Ganz, Herminamező, Kassa, Kelenföld, Kőbánya, Kispest, Lampart, Mezőkövesd, Miskolc, Pereces, Soroksár, Szeged LC, Szolnoki Légierő, Testvériség, Tiszakécske, Tokod, Zugló

Notes

- The teams in bold are competing in the 2017–18 season of the Hungarian League.

- **1** seasons: Vörös Meteor Közért
- **4** seasons: Csepeli Vasas
- **1** seasons: Debreceni Építők
- **1** seasons: Békéscsabai Pamutszövő
- **1** seasons: Vörös Meteor FÜSZÉRT
- **1** seasons: Vörös Lobogó KELTEX*
- **1** seasons: Debreceni Petőfi SK
- **2** seasons: Miskolci Lokomotív
- **2** seasons: Vasas Elzett
- **2** seasons: Szikra Gázművek
- **2** seasons: Győri Vasas
- **1** seasons: Vörös Lobogó Pamut
- **1** seasons: Mechanikai Szövőgyár SE (V. L. Magyar Gyapjúfonó)
- **1** seasons: V. L. Váci Szövő
- **1** seasons: Szombathelyi Bőrgyár
- **1** seasons: Bp. Vörös Meteor

== Statistics ==
=== EHF coefficients ===
The following data indicates Hungarian coefficient rankings between European handball leagues.

Country ranking

EHF League Ranking for 2021/22 season:

1. (1) (Hungary) Nemzeti Bajnokság I (158.33)
2. (2) (Russia) Russian Superleague (117.33)
3. (4) (Denmark) Bambusa Kvindeligaen (115.00)
4. (3) (Romania) Liga Națională (111.86)
5. (5) (France) Ligue Butagaz Énergie (95.17)
6. (6) (Norway) REMA 1000-ligaen (84.00)

=== In European competitions ===
	Champions League				EHF European League (EHF Cup)				Challenge Cup			Cup Winners' Cup (defunct)			
	C	Winning year(s)	RU	SF	C	Winning year(s)	RU	SF	C	RU	SF	C	Winning year(s)	RU	SF
Győri ETO	7	2013, 2014, 2017, 2018, 2019, 2024, 2025	4	4	0		4	0	0	0	0	0		1	1
Dunaújvárosi Kohász	1	1999	0	2	2	1998, 2016	0	1	0	0	0	1	1995	0	0
Vasas	1	1982	4	3	0		1	1	0	1	0	0		1	1
Ferencváros	0		2	3	1	2006	0	1	0	0	0	3	1978, 2011, 2012	2	2
Debreceni VSC	0		0	1	2	1995, 1996	2	1	0	0	0	0		2	1
Fehérvár KC	0		0	0	1	2005	0	2	0	0	0	0		0	0
Siófok KC	0		0	0	1	2019	0	0	0	0	0	0		0	0
Bp. Spartacus	0		1	2	0		0	2	0	0	0	1	1981	1	0
Bakony Vegyész	0		0	1	0		0	1	0	0	0	0		0	0
Építők	0		0	1	0		0	0	0	0	0	0		0	1
Érd	0		0	0	0		0	1	0	0	0	0		0	0
Szegedi ESK	0		0	0	0		0	0	0	0	1	0		0	0
Csepel	0		0	0	0		0	0	0	0	0	0		0	1
TOTAL	9 titles		11	17	7 titles		7	10	0	1	1	5 titles		7	7

== Top scorers by season ==
- 1989/90 – (Hungary) Éva Erdős
- 1990/91 – (Hungary) Auguszta Mátyás
- 1991/92 – (Hungary) Auguszta Mátyás (2)
- 1992/93 – (Hungary) Erzsébet Kocsis
- 1993/94 – (Hungary) Eszter Mátéfi
- 1994/95 – (Hungary) Bojana Radulovic
- 1995/96 – (Hungary) Zsuzsanna Viglási
- 1996/97 – (Hungary) Zsuzsanna Viglási (2)
- 1997/98 – (Romania) Florica Buda
- 1998/99 – (Hungary) Rita Deli
- 1999/00 – (Hungary) Rita Deli (2)
- 2000/01 – (Hungary) Ágnes Farkas
- 2001/02 – (Hungary) Auguszta Mátyás (3)
- 2002/03 – (Hungary) Zsuzsanna Viglási (3)
- 2003/04 – (Hungary) Auguszta Mátyás (4)
- 2004/05 – (Hungary) Auguszta Mátyás (5)
- 2005/06 – (Hungary) Beatrix Balogh
- 2006/07 – (Hungary) Judit Veszeli
- 2007/08 – (Hungary) Anita Görbicz & (Hungary) Renáta Mörtel
- 2008/09 – (Hungary) Anett Sopronyi
- 2009/10 – (Hungary) Tímea Tóth
- 2010/11 – (Hungary) Krisztina Triscsuk
- 2011/12 – (Hungary) Anita Bulath
- 2012/13 – (Hungary) Annamária Bogdanovics
- 2013/14 – (Hungary) Anita Bulath (2)
- 2014/15 – (Spain) Nerea Pena
- 2015/16 – (Serbia) Katarina Krpež Slezak
- 2016/17 – (Hungary) Krisztina Triscsuk (2)
- 2017/18 – (Serbia) Katarina Krpež Slezak (2)
- 2018/19 – (Serbia) Katarina Krpež Slezak (3)
- 2019/20 – (Hungary) Gréta Kácsor
- 2020/21 – (Hungary) Tamara Pál
- 2021/22 – (Hungary) Csenge Kuczora
- 2022/23 – (Hungary) Csenge Kuczora (2)
- 2023/24 – (Hungary) Katrin Klujber
- 2024/25 – (Hungary) Rebeka Pődör

== Notable foreign players ==
List of foreign players who previously played or currently play in the Nemzeti Bajnokság I

Algeria

- (Algeria) Sarah Khouiled

Angola

- (Angola) Isabel Guialo

Argentina

- (Argentina) Elke Karsten

Austria

- (Austria) Patricia Kovács
- (Austria) Petra Blazek
- (Austria) Gabriela Rotiș
- (Austria) Simona Spiridon
- (Austria) Kristina Dramac
- (Austria) Klara Schlegel
- (Austria) Ines Ivančok

Azerbaijan

- (Azerbaijan) Valentyna Salamakha

Belarus

- (Belarus) Elena Abramovich
- (Belarus) Karyna Yezhykava
- (Belarus) Natalia Vasileuskaya

Bosnia and Herzegovina

- (Bosnia and Herzegovina) Ivana Ljubas

Brazil

- (Brazil) Eduarda Amorim
- (Brazil) Alexandra do Nascimento
- (Brazil) Bárbara Arenhart
- (Brazil) Daniela Piedade
- (Brazil) Samira Rocha
- (Brazil) Tamires Morena
- (Brazil) Bruna de Paula
- (Brazil) Karoline de Souza
- (Brazil) Ana Amorim
- (Brazil) Mariana Costa
- (Brazil) Larissa Araújo
- (Brazil) Ana Luiza Aguiar Camelo Borba
- (Brazil) Jaqueline Anastácio
- (Brazil) Silvia Pinheiro
- (Brazil) Juliana Borges Lima
- (Brazil) Caroline Martins

Bulgaria

- (Bulgaria) Ekaterina Dzhukeva

Croatia

- (Croatia) Andrea Kobetić
- (Croatia) Katarina Ježić
- (Croatia) Vesna Milanović-Litre
- (Croatia) Ćamila Mičijević
- (Croatia) Sonja Bašić
- (Croatia) Jelena Grubišić
- (Croatia) Dijana Jovetić
- (Croatia) Aneta Benko
- (Croatia) Tea Pijević
- (Croatia) Sanela Knezović
- (Croatia) Ana Turk
- (Croatia) Kristina Elez
- (Croatia) Gabrijela Bartulović
- (Croatia) Kristina Prkačin
- (Croatia) Ivana Lovrić
- (Croatia) Dejana Milosavljević
- (Croatia) Andrea Šerić
- (Croatia) Tena Petika
- (Croatia) Marina Razum
- (Croatia) Ana Maruscec
- (Croatia) Dora Lackovic
- (Croatia) Lana Frankovic
- (Croatia) Zeljana Stojak
- (Croatia) Sara Sablic
- (Croatia) Andela Žagar
- (Croatia) Bruna Zrnić
- (Croatia) Larissa Kalaus

Czech Republic

- (Czech Republic) Jana Knedlíková
- (Czech Republic) Markéta Jeřábková
- (Czech Republic) Michaela Hrbková
- (Czech Republic) Petra Valová
- (Czech Republic) Jana Šustková
- (Czech Republic) Michaela Konečná

Denmark

- (Denmark) Sandra Toft
- (Denmark) Anne Mette Hansen
- (Denmark) Line Haugsted
- (Denmark) Simone Böhme
- (Denmark) Lotte Grigel
- (Denmark) Camilla Maibom
- (Denmark) Kristina Jørgensen
- (Denmark) Mette Tranborg
- (Denmark) Helena Elver

France

- (France) Amandine Leynaud
- (France) Laura Glauser
- (France) Estelle Nze Minko
- (France) Béatrice Edwige
- (France) Raphaëlle Tervel
- (France) Mariama Signaté
- (France) Gnonsiane Niombla
- (France) Claudine Mendy
- (France) Tamara Horacek
- (France) Camille Aoustin
- (France) Julie Foggea
- (France) Coralie Lassource
- (France) Marie-Paule Gnabouyou
- (France) Chloé Bulleux
- (France) Armelle Attingré
- (France) Catherine Gabriel
- (France) Dounia Abdourahim
- (France) Sabrina Zazai
- (France) Océane Sercien-Ugolin
- (France) Déborah Kpodar
- (France) Orlane Kanor
- (France) Hatadou Sako
- (France) Mélanie Halter
- (France) Alicia Toublanc
- (France) Emma Jacques

Germany

- (Germany) Emily Bölk
- (Germany) Dinah Eckerle
- (Germany) Laura Steinbach
- (Germany) Anja Althaus
- (Germany) Alicia Stolle
- (Germany) Nina Müller
- (Germany) Susann Müller
- (Germany) Julia Behnke
- (Germany) Ann-Cathrin Giegerich
- (Germany) Silje Brøns Petersen
- (Germany) Laetitia Quist

Iceland

- (Iceland) Arna Sif Pálsdóttir

Italy

- (Italy) Cristina Gheorghe
- (Italy) Irene Fanton

Japan

- (Japan) Mayuko Ishitate
- (Japan) Yuki Tanabe
- (Japan) Mana Ohyama
- (Japan) Natsumi Akiyama
- (Japan) Ayano Mihara

Kazakhstan

- (Kazakhstan) Dana Abilda

Lithuania

- (Lithuania) Marija Gedroit
- (Lithuania) Laima Bernatavičiūtė
- (Lithuania) Sonata Vijunaite
- (Lithuania) Elena Berciuniene

Montenegro

- (Montenegro) Jovanka Radičević
- (Montenegro) Katarina Bulatović
- (Montenegro) Anđela Bulatović
- (Montenegro) Ana Đokić
- (Montenegro) Itana Grbić
- (Montenegro) Marija Jovanović
- (Montenegro) Jelena Despotović
- (Montenegro) Bobana Klikovac
- (Montenegro) Andrea Klikovac
- (Montenegro) Sonja Barjaktarović
- (Montenegro) Anastasija Babović
- (Montenegro) Marina Rajčić
- (Montenegro) Tanja Ašanin
- (Montenegro) Vanesa Agović
- (Montenegro) Tamara Jovičevič
- (Montenegro) Andrea Brajovic
- (Montenegro) Đurđina Malović

Netherlands

- (Netherlands) Nycke Groot
- (Netherlands) Danick Snelder
- (Netherlands) Yvette Broch
- (Netherlands) Laura van der Heijden
- (Netherlands) Angela Malestein
- (Netherlands) Dione Housheer
- (Netherlands) Bo van Wetering
- (Netherlands) Kelly Dulfer
- (Netherlands) Tamara Haggerty
- (Netherlands) Ana Razdorov-Lyø
- (Netherlands) Pipy Wolfs
- (Netherlands) Daphne Luchies

North Macedonia

- (North Macedonia) Elena Gjeorgjievska
- (North Macedonia) Marija Shteriova
- (North Macedonia) Ivana Djatevska

Norway

- (Norway) Katrine Lunde
- (Norway) Heidi Løke
- (Norway) Kari Aalvik Grimsbø
- (Norway) Stine Oftedal Dahmke
- (Norway) Nora Mørk
- (Norway) Silje Solberg-Østhassel
- (Norway) Veronica Kristiansen
- (Norway) Kari Brattset Dale
- (Norway) Amanda Kurtović
- (Norway) Linn Jørum Sulland
- (Norway) Kjerstin Boge Solås
- (Norway) Emilie Christensen
- (Norway) Ida Alstad
- (Norway) Hanna Yttereng
- (Norway) Malin Holta
- (Norway) Emilie Hovden
- (Norway) Kristine Breistøl
- (Norway) Vilde Ingstad
- (Norway) Thale Rushfeldt Deila

Poland

- (Poland) Joanna Drabik
- (Poland) Weronika Kordowiecka
- (Poland) Małgorzata Trawczyńska
- (Poland) Paulina Masna
- (Poland) Daria Samionka

Portugal

- (Portugal) Jéssica Ferreira
- (Portugal) Mariana Ferreira Lopes
- (Portugal) Débora Solange Costa Moreno

Romania

- (Romania) Aurelia Brădeanu
- (Romania) Crina Pintea
- (Romania) Simona Gogîrlă
- (Romania) Paula Ungureanu
- (Romania) Denisa Dedu
- (Romania) Gabriela Perianu
- (Romania) Melinda Geiger
- (Romania) Madalina Zamfirescu
- (Romania) Ana Maria Șomoi-Lazer
- (Romania) Michaela Cracana Blaga
- (Romania) Daniela Crap
- (Romania) Nicoleta Alexandrescu
- (Romania) Georgeta Grigore
- (Romania) Ildiko Barbu
- (Romania) Stancuta Guiu
- (Romania) Nadina Dumitru
- (Romania) Alina Marin
- (Romania) Carmen Nitescu
- (Romania) Renata Ghionea
- (Romania) Laura Popa
- (Romania) Iuliana Cioculeasa
- (Romania) Daniela Palarie
- (Romania) Anca Grosu
- (Romania) Diana Patru
- (Romania) Florica Buda
- (Romania) Tatiana Horenciuc
- (Romania) Daniela Onoiu
- (Romania) Carmen Petca

Russia

- (Russia) Anna Sen
- (Russia) Anna Punko
- (Russia) Tatiana Khmyrova
- (Russia) Olga Gorshenina
- (Russia) Yana Zhilinskayte
- (Russia) Irina Nikitina
- (Russia) Yulia Khavronina
- (Russia) Yelena Avdekova
- (Russia) Darina Shulega
- (Russia) Elena Lipovka
- (Russia) Elena Kordyuk
- (Russia) Svetlana Gridneva
- (Russia) Ekaterina Kostiukova
- (Russia) Daria Dmitrieva
- (Russia) Valeriia Maslova

Senegal

- (Senegal) Hawa N'Diaye

Serbia

- (Serbia) Andrea Lekić
- (Serbia) Kristina Liščević
- (Serbia) Sanja Damnjanović
- (Serbia) Dragana Cvijić
- (Serbia) Marina Dmitrović
- (Serbia) Biljana Filipović
- (Serbia) Katarina Tomašević
- (Serbia) Jelena Lavko
- (Serbia) Sanja Radosavljević
- (Serbia) Aleksandra Vukajlović
- (Serbia) Katarina Krpež Slezak
- (Serbia) Tamara Radojević
- (Serbia) Anđela Janjušević
- (Serbia) Jovana Kovačević
- (Serbia) Jovana Risović
- (Serbia) Ana Kojić
- (Serbia) Jovana Jovović
- (Serbia) Jelena Agbaba
- (Serbia) Marija Agbaba
- (Serbia) Aleksandra Stamenić
- (Serbia) Verica Nikolic
- (Serbia) Nada Micic
- (Serbia) Jovana Dukic
- (Serbia) Leposava Glusica
- (Serbia) Ivana Mitrović
- (Serbia) Boglárka Vámos
- (Serbia) Sandra Radović
- (Serbia) Marijana Trbojevic
- (Serbia) Anastazija Đoković
- (Serbia) Sladjana Đerić
- (Serbia) Natasa Savko
- (Serbia) Dragica Tatalovic
- (Serbia) Tamara Popović
- (Serbia) Olivera Tosovic
- (Serbia) Jovana Misailović
- (Serbia) Sandra Kuridza
- (Serbia) Ana Tomkovic
- (Serbia) Sanja Bogosavljevic
- (Serbia) Monika Nikolic
- (Serbia) Natasa Krivokapic
- (Serbia) Svetlana Obucina
- (Serbia) Bojana Milic

South Korea

- (South Korea) Ryu Eun-hee

Spain

- (Spain) Nerea Pena
- (Spain) Lara González Ortega
- (Spain) Macarena Aguilar
- (Spain) Mireya González
- (Spain) Nuria Benzal
- (Spain) Maddi Aalla Rotaetxe

Slovakia

- (Slovakia) Katarína Mravíková
- (Slovakia) Simona Szarková
- (Slovakia) Mária Holešová
- (Slovakia) Barbora Lancz
- (Slovakia) Nikoleta Trúnková
- (Slovakia) Marianna Gubová
- (Slovakia) Réka Bíziková
- (Slovakia) Lucia Gubiková
- (Slovakia) Ljubica Hlavata
- (Slovakia) Lucia Uhraková
- (Slovakia) Alžbeta Tóthová
- (Slovakia) Zenetha Tóthová
- (Slovakia) Katarina Miklosová
- (Slovakia) Katarina Harisová
- (Slovakia) Dagmar Stuparičová
- (Slovakia) Jana Caltiková
- (Slovakia) Monika Rajnohová
- (Slovakia) Veronika Habánková
- (Slovakia) Martina Baciková
- (Slovakia) Renata Jancarová
- (Slovakia) Karin Bujnohova

Slovenia

- (Slovenia) Ana Gros
- (Slovenia) Alja Koren
- (Slovenia) Aneja Beganovič
- (Slovenia) Maja Vojnović
- (Slovenia) Dominika Mrmolja
- (Slovenia) Erin Novak
- (Slovenia) Tjasa Stanko

Sweden

- (Sweden) Linn Blohm
- (Sweden) Jamina Roberts
- (Sweden) Elinore Johansson
- (Sweden) Kristin Thorleifsdottir
- (Sweden) Jessica Ryde
- (Sweden) Anna Lagerquist
- (Sweden) Nathalie Hagman
- (Sweden) Daniela de Jong

Tunisia

- (Tunisia) Asma Elghaoui
- (Tunisia) Ines Khouildi

Turkey

- (Turkey) Fatos Kücükyildiz

Ukraine

- (Ukraine) Olha Nikolayenko
- (Ukraine) Lilia Gorilska
- (Ukraine) Tetyana Shynkarenko
- (Ukraine) Olena Umanets
- (Ukraine) Ganna Siukalo
- (Ukraine) Olha Vashchuk
- (Ukraine) Tamara Smbatian
- (Ukraine) Nataliya Savchyn
- (Ukraine) Tatiana Vorozhtsova
- (Ukraine) Natalia Horova
- (Ukraine) Alesia Semenchenko
- (Ukraine) Irina Chernova
- (Ukraine) Svetlana Moskovaya
- (Ukraine) Olga Kuprichenkova
- (Ukraine) Irina Samozvanova
- (Ukraine) Viktoria Tsybulenko
- (Ukraine) Ivanna Myhovych
- (Ukraine) Oksana Ploshchynska
- (Ukraine) Judit Balog
- (Ukraine) Irina Uvarovska
- (Ukraine) Fatima Ovtus
- (Ukraine) Natalya Bodenchuk
- (Ukraine) Irina Sidorova
- (Ukraine) Tetyana Stupakova
- (Ukraine) Alevtyina Melentyeva
- (Ukraine) Viktoriya Ulyanich

== Names of the competition ==
- 2016– : K&H női kézilabda liga (K&H liga)

== Broadcasting rights ==
- M4 Sport

== See also ==
- Magyar Kupa (National Cup of Hungary)
- Hungarian handball clubs in European competitions
- Hungary women's national handball team
