= GSP Ariosto Ferrara =

Italian handball club

Gruppo Sportivo Ariosto Pallamano Ferrara is an Italian women's handball club from Ferrara established in 1978, currently competing in second tier Serie A2. Ariosto played in Serie A1 between 1981 and 1994; it was the championship's runner-up in 1983 and 1992, and it made several appearances in IHF competitions. It returned to the top category in 2004, and it played the Challenge Cup in 2008 and 2009, but in 2010 it was relegated for financial reasons.
