= 1966–67 Women's European Cup (handball) =

1966–67 Women's Handball European Cup
Tournament details
- Dates: 1 December 1966 – 2 April 1967
- Teams: 10 (Qualifying stage); 8 (knockout stage)

Final positions
- Champions: (Soviet Union) Žalgiris Kaunas
- Runners-up: (East Germany) SC Leipzig

Tournament statistics
- Matches played: 24

The 1966–67 Women's Handball European Cup was the seventh edition of the international competition for European women's handball national champion clubs, taking place from December 1966 to 2 April 1967.

The title holder, SC Leipzig reached once again the final of the competition, but was defeated in the final by Žalgiris Kaunas. This victory meant the beginning of the soviet domination, until the collapse of the USSR.

== Qualifying stage ==
Team #1	Agg.	Team #2	L #1	L #2
HV Swift Roermond (Netherlands)	11 – 20	(Socialist Federal Republic of Yugoslavia) Podravka Koprivnica	5 - 12	6 – 8
Bohemians Prague (Czechoslovakia)	21 – 10	(France) ES Colombes	9 – 4	12 – 6
Górnik Sośnica (Poland)	13 – 21	(Romania) Universitatea Timişoara	8 – 9	5 – 12
Budapesti Spartacus (Hungary)	20 – 8	(Bulgaria) Akademik Sofia	5 – 3	15 – 5
Žalgiris Kaunas (Soviet Union)	15 – 14	(East Germany) SC Empor Rostock	9 – 8	6 – 6

== Quarter-finals ==
Team #1	Agg.	Team #2	L #1	L #2
SC Leipzig (East Germany)	25 – 15	(Socialist Federal Republic of Yugoslavia) Podravka Koprivnica	15 – 8	10 – 7
Bohemians Prague (Czechoslovakia)	12 – 12	(West Germany) Bayer Leverkusen	7 – 6	5 – 6
Universitatea Timişoara (Romania)	18 – 12	(Denmark) Frederiksberg	8 – 2	10 – 10
Žalgiris Kaunas (Soviet Union)	18 – 16	(Hungary) Budapesti Spartacus	11 – 8	7 – 8

== Semi-finals ==
Team #1	Agg.	Team #2	L #1	L #2
SC Leipzig (East Germany)	23 – 9	(Czechoslovakia) Bohemians Prague	13 – 3	10 – 6
Žalgiris Kaunas (Soviet Union)	14 – 12	(Romania) Universitatea Timişoara	10 – 7	4 – 5

== Final ==
Date	Team #1	Result	Team #2
02.04.1967	Žalgiris Kaunas (Soviet Union)	8 – 7	(East Germany) SC Leipzig

Women's Handball European Cup
1966–67 Winner

(Soviet Union) Žalgiris Kaunas
First title
