= 1965–66 Women's European Cup (handball) =

1965–66 Women's Handball European Cup
Tournament details
- Dates: 9 January – 16 April 1966
- Teams: 8 (Qualification stage); 8 (knockout stage)

Final positions
- Champions: (East Germany) SC Leipzig
- Runners-up: (Denmark) HG Copenhague

Tournament statistics
- Matches played: 22

The 1965–66 Women's European Champions Cup was the 6th edition of the Europe's competition for national champions women's handball clubs, taking place from 9 January to 16 April 1966.

HG Copenhague entered the competition as title holder, after beating in past season's final Budapesti Spartacus. Copenhague reached once again the final, but this year the Danish team was defeated by SC Leipzig. It was the first time that an East-German team won the title.

== Qualifying stage ==
Team #1	Agg.	Team #2	L #1	L #2
Trud Moscow (Soviet Union)	38 – 18	(France) AC Colombus	19 – 9	19 – 9
Sparta Prague (Czechoslovakia)	15 – 14	(Poland) Gornik Sonowietz	10 – 4	5 – 10
Valur (Iceland)	23 – 21	(Norway) Skogn	11 – 9	12 – 12
SC Leipzig (East Germany)	14 – 9	(Netherlands) Swift Roermond	6 – 3	8 – 6

== Quarter-finals ==
Team #1	Agg.	Team #2	L #1	L #2
HG Copenhague (Denmark)	19 – 15	(Soviet Union) Trud Moskva	10 – 8	9 – 7
Sparta Prague (Czechoslovakia)	18 – 17	(West Germany) Bayer Leverkusen	12 – 10	6 – 7
Budapesti Spartacus (Hungary)	18 – 10	(Bulgaria) VIF G.Dimitrov Sofia	5 – 8	13 – 2
SC Leipzig (East Germany)	45 – 17	(Iceland) Valur	19 – 8	26 – 9

== Semi-finals ==
Team #1	Agg.	Team #2	L #1	L #2
HG Copenhague (Denmark)	16 – 8	(Czechoslovakia) Sparta Prague	10 – 3	6 – 5
SC Leipzig (East Germany)	15 – 9	(Hungary) Budapesti Spartacus	10 – 4	5 – 5

== Final ==
Team 1	Agg.	Team 2	1st leg	2nd leg
SC Leipzig (East Germany)	17 – 11	(Denmark) HG Copenhague	7 – 6	10 – 5

Women's Handball European Cup
1965–66 Winner

(East Germany) SC Leipzig
First title
