= VfL Engelskirchen =

German sports club

- Full name: VfL Engelskirchen 1883/1913 e.V.
- Founded: 24 June 1883; 143 years ago

VfL Engelskirchen is a German sports club from Engelskirchen, Cologne established in 1883.

It is best known for its women's handball team, which reached the Bundesliga in 1979. Engelskirchen was the 1982 Bundesliga's runner-up and three years later it reached the final of the 1985 DHB-Pokal. The following year was the team's most successful season as it won the DHB-Pokal for the first time, was the championship's runner-up and also reached the final of the 1986 EHF Cup Winners' Cup, lost to Radnicki Belgrade. In 1988 Engelskirchen won its second national championship, but the following year it had to renounce to top-flight for financial reasons. Nowadays it plays in regional categories.

The club was founded on 24 June 1883 as Turnverein (TV) Engelskirchen.

== Titles ==
- DHB-Pokal
  - 1986, 1988

== Notable former coaches ==
- (Serbia) Risto Buha
