= 1984–85 Women's IHF Cup =

European handball tournament

The 1984–85 Women's IHF Cup was the fourth edition of the competition. As eighteen teams took part in the competition instead of the previous edition's twelve, with Bulgaria and Turkey making their debut, the Round of 16 was reinstated. Vorwärts Frankfurt defeated Vasas Budapest in the final to become the first East German club to win the trophy.

== Preliminary round ==
| Team #1 | Agg. | Team #2 | 1st match | 2nd match |
|---|---|---|---|---|
| Sasja Hoboken (Belgium) | 39–19 | (Luxembourg) Pétange | 27–8 | 12–11 |

== Round of 16 ==
| Team #1 | Agg. | Team #2 | 1st match | 2nd match |
|---|---|---|---|---|
| Iskra Partizánske (Czech Republic) | 51–30 | (Sweden) Göteborg | 31–10 | 20–20 |
| Erkutspor Mersin (Turkey) | 21–36 | (Netherlands) Entius | 11–16 | 10–20 |
| Vasas Budapest (Hungary) | 70–12 | (Belgium) Sasja Hoboken | 29–6 | 41–6 |
| Trešnjevka (Socialist Federal Republic of Yugoslavia) | Walkover | (Soviet Union) Avtomobilist Baku | | |
| Kremikovtsi (Bulgaria) | 39–40 | (Norway) Gjerpen | 22–19 | 17–21 |
| Vorwärts Frankfurt (East Germany) | 40–37 | (Romania) Rulmentul Brasov | 22–12 | 18–25 |
| Onda (Spain) | 34–42 | (France) Besançon | 22–19 | 12–23 |
| Lützellinden (Germany) | 34–32 | (Denmark) Tranbjerg | 20–17 | 14–15 |

== Quarter-finals ==
| Team #1 | Agg. | Team #2 | 1st match | 2nd match |
|---|---|---|---|---|
| Iskra Partizánske (Czech Republic) | 54–31 | (Netherlands) Entius | 32–12 | 22–19 |
| Vasas Budapest (Hungary) | 44–38 | (Soviet Union) Avtomobilist Baku | 23–15 | 21–23 |
| Gjerpen (Norway) | 29–43 | (East Germany) Vorwärts Frankfurt | 18–18 | 11–25 |
| Besançon (France) | 27–38 | (Germany) Lützellinden | 17–14 | 10–24 |

== Semifinals ==
| Team #1 | Agg. | Team #2 | 1st match | 2nd match |
|---|---|---|---|---|
| Iskra Partizánske (Czech Republic) | 37–44 | (Hungary) Vasas Budapest | 21–23 | 16–21 |
| Vorwärts Frankfurt (East Germany) | 57–31 | (Germany) Lützellinden | 25–10 | 32–21 |

== Final ==
| Team #1 | Agg. | Team #2 | 1st match | 2nd match |
|---|---|---|---|---|
| Vasas Budapest (Hungary) | 32–36 | (East Germany) Vorwärts Frankfurt | 19–17 | 13–19 |
