= Vasas SC (women's handball) =

Hungarian women's handball team

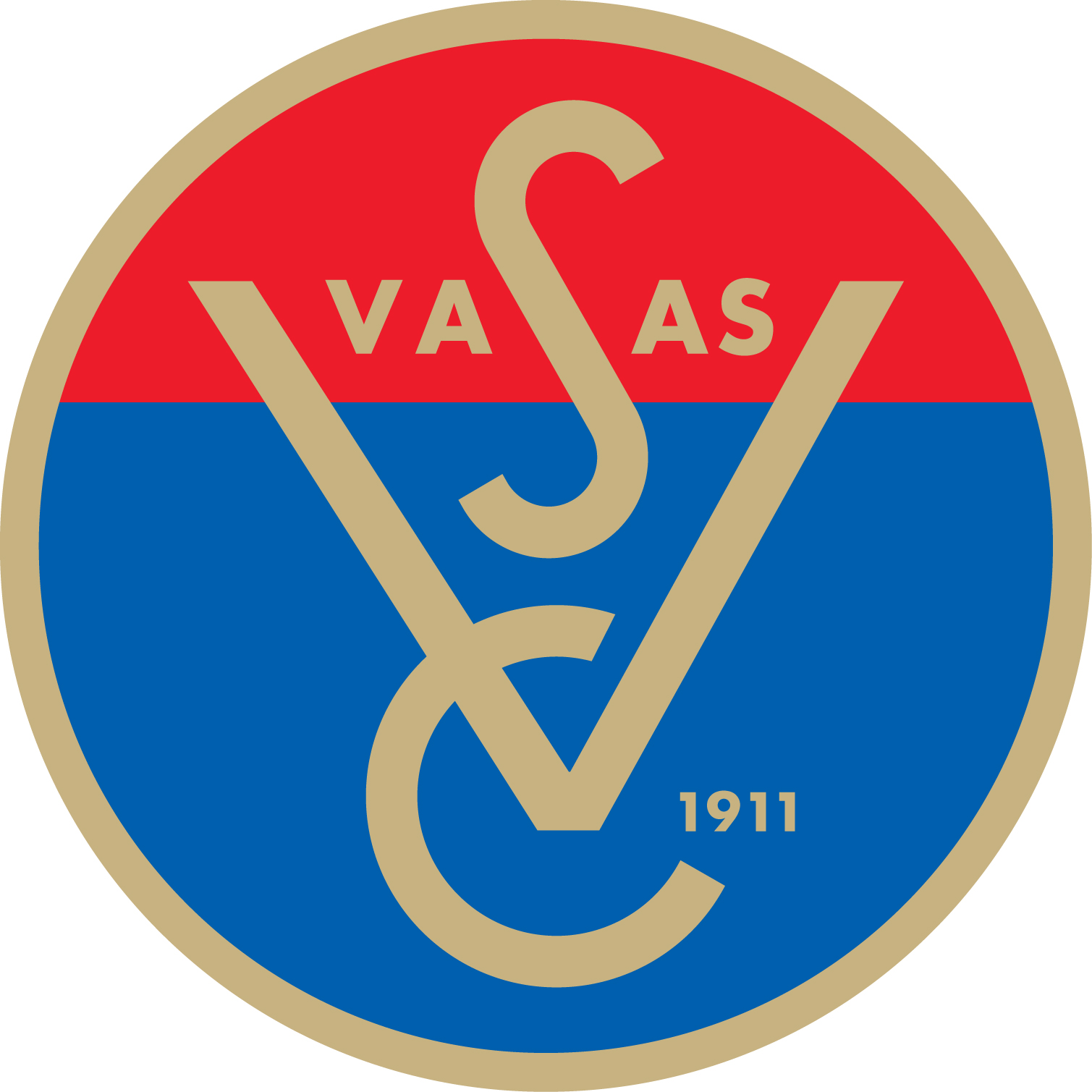
- Full name: Vasas Sport Club
- Short name: Vasas SC
- Founded: 1926; 100 years ago
- Arena: Sterbinszky Amália Kézilabdacsarnok
- Capacity: 600
- President: László Markovits
- Head coach: Csaba Konkoly
- League: Nemzeti Bajnokság I
- 2022–23: Nemzeti Bajnokság I/B – 1st
- Club colours
Home	Away

Vasas SC is a Hungarian women's handball team. It is part of the Budapest-based multi-sports club Vasas SC. One of the most successful teams in the country, they have won the Hungarian championship a record 15 times and in 1982 they were also crowned as the European Champions Cup winners.

== History ==
Hazena, the early form of the modern handball, had been played across Europe for years, when, in 1926, based on the players who were fired by MTE for political reasons, Vas- és Fémmunkások Sport Clubja was founded. Until 1928 there was not an organized national championship and the hazena team participated only in several invitational tournaments. Due to financial reasons the club suspended its operations in 1931.

After a financial consolidation the handball department of Vasas was reborn and entered the championship in 1938. The brightest year of this era was 1945, when Vasas won the second division title and gained promotion to the top level championship. However, just after a few years, due growing troubles the club decided to withdraw from the competitive handball once again.

On 7 March 1956 the Sport School of Angyalföld (Angyalföldi Sportiskola) was founded. Under head coach József Ferenczy the Sport School performed brilliantly, having won several youth and junior titles. They also wanted to enter the adult competition, but the permit was not granted. Instead of that, they got the chance from Hungarian Handball Federation to join either Csavargyár or Vasas. They have chosen Vasas and the team has risen from its ashes in 1960. With the ASI-girls on the board, under the new, team handball rules, Vasas entered the Budapest II championship and won it in their inaugural year and gained promotion. In 1962 they celebrated another promotion, this time from the Budapest I division to the NB II. In 1964 Vasas climbed to the NB I, the top-level league in Hungary. Although they suffered a surprise relegation in 1965, they spent only one season in the NB II. With the comeback in 1967 the brightest period in the club's life began.

In 1969 the Vasas lifted the Hungarian Cup trophy, followed by another Cup title in 1971. From 1972 they have won the Hungarian Championship an exceptional eleven times in a row – in 1977 and 1981 they did not even drop a single point throughout the season. Adding to this, they also won the Hungarian Cup eight times in this period. Their most successful year came in 1982, when Vasas did the treble: beside the Hungarian Championship and Hungarian Cup they took the European Champions Cup title as well.

From the second part of the eighties the key players of the golden era either retired or moved abroad and the Hungarian Championship got more balanced as well, which led to Vasas slowly lost their dominant role.

In the nineties, after the transition, private companies took over the club and became their main sponsor. In short term Vasas benefited from it, they managed to put together a strong squad and the team was shining in the old glory. However, after these financials grown narrow, a disintegration process started. To save from cessation, in 2004 Vasas Sport Club took the team under control. In 2009, Vasas said goodbye to NB I.

After eight years, the team was able to start the 2017/18 season again in the top division after winning the NB I / B Championship. However, the cutting-edge outing lasted only a year. The team was promoted again in 2021, but was eliminated at the end of the season.

== Crest, colours, supporters ==
=== Kit manufacturers and Shirt sponsor ===
The following table shows in detail Vasas SC kit manufacturers and shirt sponsors by year:

Period	Kit manufacturer	Shirt sponsor
	hummel	
2004–2005	hummel	UNIQA Biztosító
2005–2008	hummel	Invitel
2008	Lancast	UNIQA
2008	Lancast	–
2009	Lancast	MVM
2009–2013	Lancast	–
2013–2019	Erima	–
2019–2021	2Rule	
2021–	Joma	

== Team ==
=== Current squad ===
Squad for the 2026–27 season

Goalkeepers

- 16 (Hungary) Nikolett Tóth
- (Hungary) Kincső Csapó
- (Hungary) Norma Hargitai

Wingers

RW

- 11 (Hungary) Petra Mihály
- 72 (Hungary) Rebeka Arany
- (Hungary) Hanga Jakab

LW

- 4 (Hungary) Fanni Csire
- (Hungary) Fanni Bede

Line players

- 31 (Hungary) Katalin Dombi
- 62 (Hungary) Gréta Sápi
- (Hungary) Andjela Vilovski

Back players

LB

- 18 (Hungary) Fanni Szilovics
- 92 (Hungary) Nóra Nagy
- 74 (Hungary) Dorka Gáspár
- (Hungary) Eszter Ogonovszky

CB

- (Hungary) Mirella Fekete
- 9 (Hungary) Lara Varjas
- 33 (Hungary) Nikolett Tóth
- (Hungary) Dorina Román

RB

- 10 (Russia) Anna Kekezovity
- (Hungary) Éva Schneider

=== Transfers for the 2026–27 season ===
Joining

- (Hungary) Éva Schneider (RB) from (Hungary) Moyra-Budaörs Handball
- (Hungary) Fanni Bede (LW) from (Hungary) Moyra-Budaörs Handball
- (Hungary) Kincső Csapó (GK) from (Hungary) National Academy of Handball
- (Hungary) Eszter Ogonovszky (LB) from (Spain) Super Amara Bera Bera

Leaving

- (Hungary) Kíra Oláh (LW) to (Hungary) MTK Budapest
- (Hungary) Virág Mészáros (GK)

=== Staff members ===
- (Hungary) Chairman: László Markovits
- (Hungary) Technical Director: Ferenc Venczkó
- (Hungary) Head Coach: Csaba Konkoly
- (Hungary) Assistant Coach/Youth Coach: Dániel Kiss
- (Hungary) Goalkeeper Coach: István Bakos

== Honours ==
=== Domestic competitions ===
Nemzeti Bajnokság I (National Championship of Hungary)

- Champions (15) – record: 1972, 1973, 1974, 1975, 1976, 1977, 1978, 1979, 1980, 1981, 1982, 1984, 1985, 1991–92, 1992–93
- Runners-up (1): 1986
- Third place (7): 1953, 1967, 1969, 1971, 1993–94, 1994–95, 1996–97

Magyar Kupa (National Cup of Hungary)

- Winners (11): 1969, 1971, 1974, 1976, 1978, 1979, 1980, 1981, 1982, 1984, 1986
- Finalist (7): 1970, 1977, 1987, 1991–92, 1992–93, 1994–95, 1996–97

=== European competitions ===
- European Champions Cup:
  - Winners: 1982
  - Finalists: 1978, 1979, 1993, 1994
- EHF Cup Winners' Cup:
  - Finalists: 1988
  - Semifinalists: 1996
- EHF Cup:
  - Semifinalists: 1997
- EHF City Cup:
  - Finalists: 1995

== Recent seasons ==
As of 10 August 2023

- Seasons in Nemzeti Bajnokság I: 45
- Seasons in Nemzeti Bajnokság I/B: 11
- Seasons in Nemzeti Bajnokság II: 3

Season	Division	Pos.	Magyar kupa
1963	NB II	6th	
1964	NB II	First place	
1965	NB I	12th	
1966	NB II	First place	
1967	NB I	Third place	
1968	NB I	6th	
1969	NB I	Third place	Winner
1970	NB I	4th	Finalist
1971	NB I	Third place	Winner
1972	NB I	First place	
1973	NB I	First place	
1974	NB I	First place	Winner
1975	NB I	First place	
1976	NB I	First place	Winner
1977	NB I	First place	Finalist
1978	NB I	First place	Winner
1979	NB I	First place	Winner
1980	NB I	First place	Winner
1981	NB I	First place	Winner
1982	NB I	First place	Winner
1983	NB I	4th	

Season	Division	Pos.	Magyar kupa
1984	NB I	First place	Winner
1985	NB I	First place	
1986	NB I	Second place	Winner
1987	NB I	4th	Finalist
1988–89	NB I	7th	
1989–90	NB I	8th	
1990–91	NB I	11th	
1991–92	NB I	First place	Finalist
1992–93	NB I	First place	Finalist
1993–94	NB I	Third place	
1994–95	NB I	Third place	Finalist
1995–96	NB I	5th	
1996–97	NB I	Third place	Finalist
1997–98	NB I	4th	
1998–99	NB I	7th	
1999-00	NB I	7th	
2000–01	NB I	6th	
2001–02	NB I	7th	
2002–03	NB I	10th	
2003–04	NB I	7th	
2004–05	NB I	6th	

Season	Division	Pos.	Magyar kupa
2005–06	NB I	7th	
2006–07	NB I	6th	
2007–08	NB I	10th	
2008–09	NB I	12th	
2009–10	NB I/B	6th	
2010–11	NB I/B	7th	Round 2
2011–12	NB I/B	7th	Round 3
2012–13	NB I/B	2nd	Round 2
2013–14	NB I/B	4th	Round 2
2014–15	NB I/B	3rd	Round 4
2015–16	NB I/B	3rd	Round 2
2016–17	NB I/B	First place	Round 3
2017–18	NB I	14th	Round 3
2018–19	NB I/B	5th	Round 3
2019–20	NB I/B	Cancelled	Round 1
2020–21	NB I/B	First place	Round 3
2021–22	NB I	14th	Round 4
2022–23	NB I/B	First place	
2023–24	NB I		

=== In European competition ===
- Participations in Champions League (Champions Cup): 13x
- Participations in EHF Cup (IHF Cup): 2x
- Participations in Challenge Cup (City Cup): 2x
- Participations in Cup Winners' Cup (IHF Cup Winners' Cup): 4x

== Head coach history ==
Head coach history is:

- (Hungary) Sándor Cséfay: 1965–1968
- (Hungary) Ottó Fleck: 1968–1975
- (Hungary) János Csík: 1975–1981; 1983; 1984; 1991–1993; 1996–1998; 2015–2017
- (Hungary) Mihály Gódor: 1983
- (Hungary) István Hikádé: 1984–1987
- (Hungary) Zsolt Barabás: 1987
- (Hungary) Béla Fekete: 1988
- (Hungary) Béla Csönge: 1988
- (Hungary) Aladárné Krámer: 1989–1990
- (Hungary) Zsuzsa Liskáné Balogh: 1990–1991
- (Hungary) Sándor Németh: 1993–1994
- (Hungary) Antal Berendi: 1999–2000
- (Hungary) József Kenyeres: 2000
- (Hungary) Gyula Zsiga: 1994–1996; 2000–2001
- (Hungary) Vilmos Köstner: 2001–2005
- (Hungary) Lajos Mocsai: 1982; 2005–2007
- (Hungary) György Papp: 1998–1999; 2007–2010
- (Hungary) Márta Varga: 2010–2015; 2018–2019
- (Hungary) Péter Kovács: 2017–2018
- (Hungary) Gergely Penszki: 2019–2023
- (Hungary) Csaba Konkoly: 2023–

== Notable players ==
- (Hungary) Ágota Bujdosó
- (Hungary) Ágnes Babos Fleckné
- (Hungary) Mária Ácsbog
- (Hungary) Mariann Rácz
- (Hungary) Tünde Bajcziné Nemere
- (Hungary) Gabriella Rajz
- (Hungary) Györgyi Győrvári Őriné
- (Hungary) Éva Barna
- (Hungary) Mariann Nagy Gódorné
- (Hungary) Margit Brinzay
- (Hungary) Éva Angyal
- (Hungary) Szilvia Tarjáni
- (Hungary) Amália Sterbinszky
- (Hungary) Katalin Gombai
- (Hungary) Anikó Szabadfi Kuruczné
- (Hungary) Tünde Lantos
- (Hungary) Zsuzsa Balogh Liskáné
- (Hungary) Aladárné Krámer
- (Hungary) Klára Horváth
- (Hungary) Mária Vanya Vadászné
- (Hungary) Mária Hajós Ihászné
- (Hungary) Ilona Samus Mihálykáné
- (Hungary) Anna György
- (Hungary) Orsolya Vérten
- (Hungary) Zsuzsanna Tomori
- (Hungary) Ágnes Triffa
- (Hungary) Melinda Pastrovics
- (Hungary) Judit Simics
- (Hungary) Éva Erdős
- (Hungary) Andrea Farkas
- (Hungary) Irina Sirina
- (Hungary) Rita Borbás
- (Hungary) Anikó Kántor
- (Hungary) Rita Deli
- (Hungary) Zsanett Borbély
- (Hungary) Zsuzsanna Lovász
- (Hungary) Szilvia Ábrahám
- (Hungary) Olívia Kamper
- (Hungary) Anita Cifra
- (Hungary) Ágota Utasi
- (Hungary) Rita Hochrajter
- (Hungary) Györgyi Hang
- (Hungary) Márta Varga
- (Hungary) Zsófia Pásztor
- (Hungary) Krisztina Nagy
- (Hungary) Adrienn Gaál
- (Hungary) Erika Oravecz
- (Hungary) Edina Tóthné Rott
- (Hungary) Barbara Balogh
- (Hungary) Blanka Kajdon (2021–2022)
- (Hungary) Viktória Koroknai
- (Hungary) Fanni Kenyeres
- (Hungary) Andrea Lőw
- (Hungary) Adrienn Őri
- (Hungary) Melinda Berta
- (Hungary) Beáta Balog
- (Hungary) Anita Laczó
- (Hungary) Judit Csenki
- (Hungary) Barbara Németh
- (Hungary) Irén Mezőségi
- (Hungary) Andrea Kovásznai
- (Hungary) Krisztina Csernus
- (Hungary) Beatrix Prok
- (Hungary) Judit Bartus
- (Hungary) Piroska Bartek
- (Hungary) (Serbia) Andrea Sterbik
- (Romania) Cristina Mihai
- (Romania) Mihaela Galai
- (Romania) Stancuta Guiu
- (Serbia) Marija Agbaba
- (Serbia) Marija Dmitrovic
- (Slovakia) Žaneta Tóthová
- (Slovakia) Alzbeta Polláková
- (Ukraine) Natalia Horova
- (Ukraine) Fatima Ovtus
- (Ukraine) Svetlana Moskovaya
- (Ukraine) Irina Chernova
- (Ukraine) Olesia Semenchenko
- (Ukraine) Alevtyina Melentyeva
- (Hungary) (France) Melinda Jacques
- (Socialist Federal Republic of Yugoslavia) (Netherlands) Ana Razdorov-Lyø

== See also ==
- Vasas SC
