= Auguszta Mátyás =

Hungarian handball player (born 1968)

Medal record

Representing Hungary

Women's Handball

Olympic Games
Bronze medal – third place	1996 Atlanta	Team

Auguszta Mátyás (born January 17, 1968, in Nagykanizsa) is a retired Hungarian handball player (left back) and Olympic medalist.

== Clubs ==
- – 1991 Nagykanizsai Olajbányász
- 1991 – 1998 Dunaferr SE
- 1998 – 1999 Cornexi Alcoa
- 1999 – 2005 Váci NKSE
- 2005 Ciudad Almeria
- 2005 – 2006 Váci NKSE
- 2006 – 2007 Kőbánya Spartacus

== Awards ==
- Nemzeti Bajnokság I Top Scorer: 1991, 1992, 2002, 2004, 2005
