= Magda Jóna =

Hungarian handball player (1934-1993)

Medal record

Representing Hungary

Women's Handball

World Championship
Gold medal – first place	1965 West Germany	
Silver medal – second place	1957 Yugoslavia	

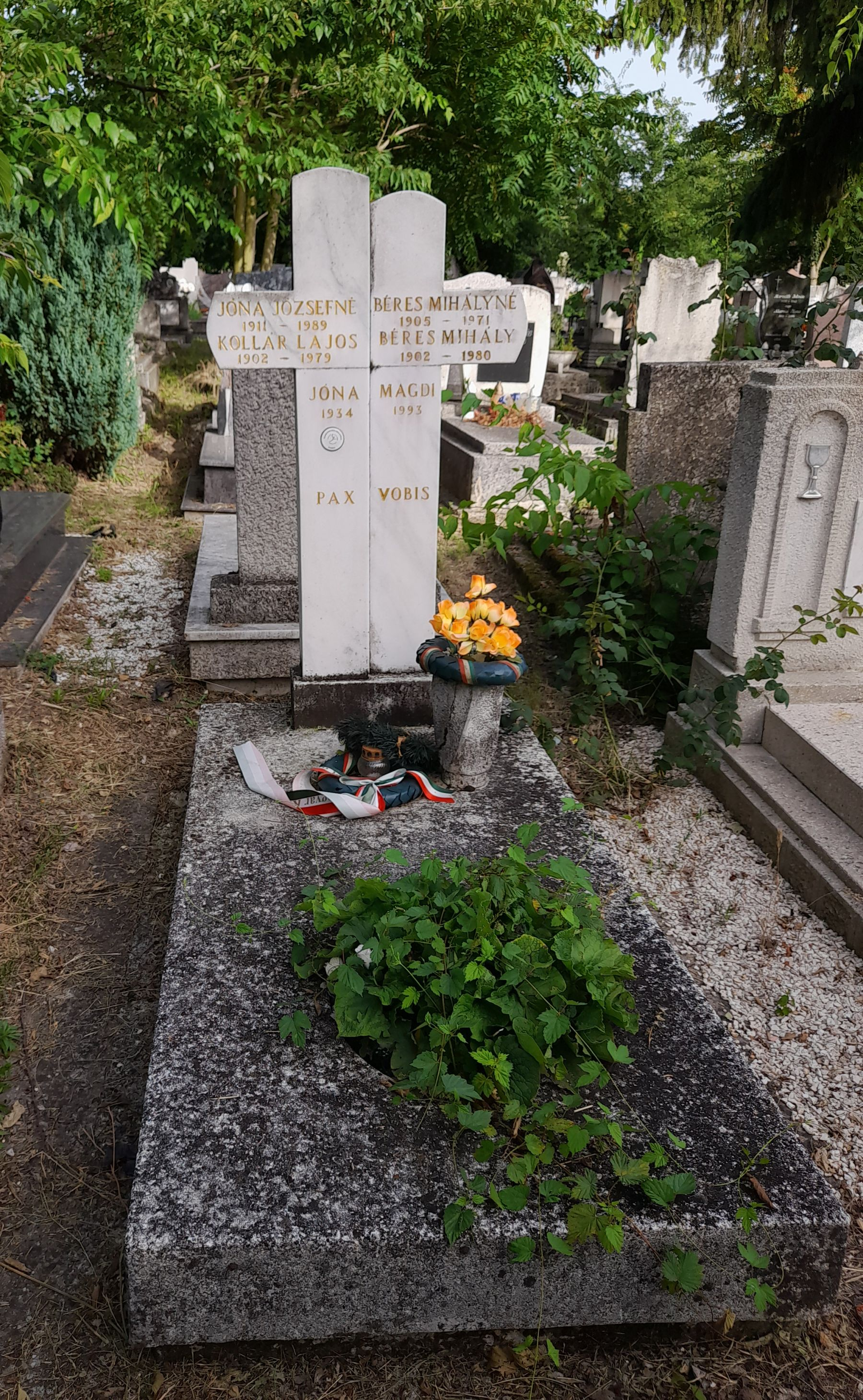
Grave of Magda Jóna

Magda Jóna (14 August 1934 – 15 April 1993) was a Hungarian handballer who played for Győri Vasas, Újpesti Gyapjú and Budapesti Spartacus SC. She was capped for the Hungarian field handball national team once in 1956, and played for the country's handball national team 44 times between 1955 and 1966.

On club level she won the Hungarian Championship five times (1959, 1963, 1964, 1965, 1967) and reached the final of the European Champions Cup in 1965, just to fall short against HG København.

With the national team she participated in three World Championships (1957, 1962, 1965), winning the tournament in 1965 and collecting a silver medal in 1957.
