= Éva Csulik =

Hungarian handball player (born 1954)

Medal record

Representing Hungary

Women's Handball

World Championship
Bronze medal – third place	1978 Czechoslovakia	Team

Éva Csulik (née Bozó, born April 5, 1954, in Békéscsaba) is a former Hungarian handball player and World Championship bronze medalist from 1975. She was also member of the Hungarian team which finished fourth on the 1980 Summer Olympics. She played in all five matches and scored eleven goals.

== Awards ==
- Nemzeti Bajnokság I Top Scorer: 1976, 1978
