= Veszprém Barabás KC =

- Full name: Veszprém Barabás Kézilabda Club
- Short name: VBKC
- Founded: 1966
- Dissolved: 2014
- Arena: Március 15. úti Sportcsarnok
- Capacity: 2,500
- President: Árpád Barabás
- Head coach: Kálmán Róth
- League: Nemzeti Bajnokság I
- 2011–2012: Nemzeti Bajnokság I, 5th
- Club colours
Home	Away

Veszprém Barabás Kézilabda Club was a women's handball team from Veszprém.

== History ==
The club was founded under the name Veszprém Vasas in 1966, but went through a name evolution during the years. It has been changed to Bakony Vasas and Bakony Vegyész later, after the nearby mountain Bakony.

The team enjoyed their best spell from the late 60's to the early 80's, having won the championship title once and being runners-up five times. That time the club had players like the World Cup winner Erzsébet Lengyel or Borbála Tóth Harsányi and her sister Katalin Tóth Harsányi, who have won bronze medal on the 1976 Summer Olympics in Montréal. In the late eighties, due to the lack of financials the team slowly decreased, and got relegated to Nemzeti Bajnokság I/B in 1986. Five years later they suffered a further level drop, having won only one game in their second division campaign that season. They played in county level until the club's revival in 2002.

That time Árpád Barabás stood behind the club and granted the financial background. One year later, in 2003, they promoted to NB II and in 2009 they have finally climbed back to the top division.

In the 2011–12 season, after some of the sponsors stepped down, Veszprém faced a financial crisis, following they let their key players to go. For a brief period it was not even sure whether they can maintain their top division membership, despite being mid-table team. Finally in May 2012 the club signed a co-operation agreement with Győri Audi ETO KC for a period of three years, according to which Győr delegate 14 players to Veszprém, all of whom played for the second division winning team of ETO 2 in the previous season. Since the farm teams are not eligible for promotion, this move ensures the continuous development of the Győr youngsters and in the same time Veszprém can further run a top-flight team. The sides also agreed upon that Kálmán Róth, head coach of the Győri Audi ETO 2 and the Hungarian women's junior national team takes the managerial duties. The club also solved the financial problems by acquiring a new main sponsor, Duna Takarék, altering their name to Veszprém Barabás Duna Takarék KC. After two years, ETO moved the club and the NB I starting right to Mosonmagyaróvár. This is when the history of the Mosonmagyaróvár Handball Club began. Veszprém Barabás KC was closed down in 2014.

== Kits ==
HOME

2013–14

AWAY

2013–14

== Results ==
- Nemzeti Bajnokság I:
  - Gold: 1970
  - Silver: 1969, 1971, 1974, 1975, 1983
  - Bronze: 1968, 1972, 1976, 1981, 1982, 1984
- Magyar Kupa:
  - Winners: 1973, 1984

== Former notable players ==
- (Hungary) Dóra Hornyák
- (Hungary) Éva Kiss
- (Hungary) Gabriella Juhász
- (Hungary) Ivett Nagy
- (Hungary) Míra Emberovics
- (Hungary) Ibolya Mehlmann
- (Hungary) Viktória Koroknai
- (Hungary) Szilvia Ábrahám
- (Hungary) Anita Bulath
- (Hungary) Annamária Király
- (Hungary) Bettina Pásztor
- (Hungary) Vivien Víg
- (Hungary) Judit Veszeli
- (Hungary) Szimonetta Planéta
- (Hungary) Zsófi Szemerey
- (Hungary) Eszter Tóth
- (Hungary) Gabriella Tóth
- (Hungary) Szabina Mayer
- (Hungary) Fruzsina Azari
- (Hungary) Nadine Schatzl
- (Hungary) Krisztina Triscsuk
- (Hungary) Veronika Farkas
- (Hungary) Renáta Gerstmár
- (Hungary) Kitti Hoffmann
- (Hungary) Kata Földes
- (Slovakia) Alžbeta Polláková

== Coaching history ==
- (Hungary) János Gyurka (2009–2012)
- (Hungary) Kálmán Róth (2012–2014)

== See also ==
- 2011–12 Nemzeti Bajnokság I (women's handball)
