= Nemzeti Bajnokság I/B (women's handball) =

- Founded: 1968
- Divisions: Western (Nyugati) / Eastern (Keleti)
- No. of teams: 24 (in two groups)
- Country: Hungary
- Confederation: EHF
- Most recent champions: Mosonmagyaróvári KC SE / Eszterházy KESC (2017-18)
- Promotion to: Nemzeti Bajnokság I
- Relegation to: Nemzeti Bajnokság II
- Website: Western Group: Eastern Group:
- 2018–19 Nemzeti Bajnokság I/B

The Nemzeti Bajnokság I/B (English: National Championship I/B) is the second tier league for Hungarian women's handball clubs. It is administered by the Hungarian Handball Federation. The league is divided into two groups, a Western one and an Eastern one. Fourteen teams compete in each group and the group winners gain automatic promotion to the NB I.

== Teams ==
The following teams participate in the 2018–19 season:

Western Group	Eastern Group
DKKA U19	Gödi SE
Dorogi ESE	Hajdúnánás SK
Gárdony-Pázmánd NKK	Kecskeméti NKSE
Győri Audi ETO KC U19	Kispest NKK-Endo Plus Se
Kozármisleny SE	Levendula H. FKSE-Algyő
Mohácsi TE 1888	NKK Balmazújváros
NEKA	Nyíradony VVTK
Pénzügyőr SE	Oxxo Energy Orosházi NKC
Rinyamenti KC	PC Trade Szeged KKSE
Szekszárdi FGKC	Szent István SE-OTP Bank
Szombathelyi Haladás	Szentendrei NKE
Szombathelyi KKA	Vasas SC
