= Budapesti Spartacus SC (women's handball) =

- Full name: Budapesti Spartacus Sport Club
- Short name: Bp. Spartacus
- Founded: 1954
- Head coach: Zsuzsanna Viglási
- League: Nemzeti Bajnokság I/B
- 2009–10: Nemzeti Bajnokság I/B – Eastern Group, 10th
- Club colours
| Home | Away |

Budapesti Spartacus Sport Club is a Hungarian women's handball team from Budapest, that play in the Nemzeti Bajnokság I/B, the second tier league in Hungary. The club was formed in 1954 and soon found themselves on the top. Spari, as the fans call the team, have won all but one league titles between 1960 and 1967, and in addition, they have won two domestic cup titles in 1963 and 1968. They also enjoyed a good run in the European Champions Cup, having been marched to the finals in 1965, only to fall short against HG København.

In the seventies the club have fallen back, and eventually slumped to relegation in 1975. However, the team promoted back immediately and under the guidance of head coach István Szabó a new success period has begun. Spartacus have won the national championship title in 1983 and 1986, and lifted the Hungarian cup trophy in 1988. Beside the domestic hit they also took the EHF Cup Winners' Cup in 1981.

From the nineties the club slowly relapsed and turned into a mid-table team. Parallel to this, their financial potential is narrowed and it all ended up in a relegation to the Nemzeti Bajnokság I/B in 2007.

Since they are co-operating with another Budapest-based club, Pénzügyőr SE, the team is officially known as Pénzügyőr-Spartacus SC.

== Kits ==
HOME
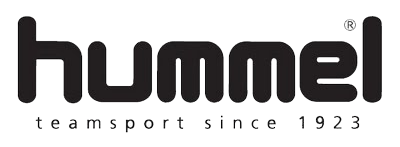
2018–19

AWAY
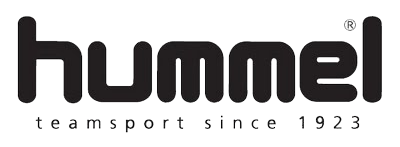
2018–19

== Selected former players ==
- (Hungary) Ágnes Farkas
- (Hungary) Andrea Farkas
- (Hungary) Éva Erdős
- (Hungary) Ágnes Végh
- (Hungary) Zsuzsanna Varga
- (Hungary) Magda Jóna
- (Hungary) Klára Horváth
- (Hungary) Valéria Agocs
- (Hungary) Beáta Balog
- (Hungary) Orsolya Herr
- (Hungary) Zita Szucsánszki
- (Hungary) Zsuzsanna Viglási
- (Hungary) Nikolett Brigovácz
- (Hungary) Judit Veszeli
- (Hungary) Katalin Borkowska
- (Hungary) Auguszta Mátyás
- (Hungary) Fanni Kenyeres
- (Hungary) Beáta Balog
- (Hungary) Eszter Laluska
- (Hungary) Judit Pőcze
- (Ukraine) Oksana Ploshchynska
- (Serbia) Jasmina Petrovic

=== Head coach history ===
- (Hungary) Pál Nádori
- (Hungary) Ottó Fleck
- (Hungary) István Szabó
- (Hungary) Barabás Pánczél (1996–1998; 2000–2002; 2007)
- (Hungary) Ervin Horváth (2002–2003)
- (Hungary) László Palásthy (2003–2004)
- (Hungary) János Csík (2004–2005)
- (Hungary) ifj. Szilárd Kiss (2005)
- (Hungary) Zoltán Marczinka (2005)
- (Hungary) László Laurencz (2005–2007)

== Honours ==
=== Domestic competitions ===
Nemzeti Bajnokság I (National Championship of Hungary)

- Champions (9): 1960, 1961, 1962, 1963, 1964, 1965, 1967, 1983, 1986
- Runners-up (5): 1966, 1979, 1980, 1981, 1984
- Third place (5): 1958, 1970, 1973, 1985, 1988–89

Magyar Kupa (National Cup of Hungary)

- Winners (3): 1963, 1968, 1988
- Finalists (6): 1969, 1972, 1979, 1980, 1981, 1984

=== European competitions ===
- European Champions Cup:
  - Finalists: 1965
- EHF Cup Winners' Cup:
  - Winners: 1981
  - Finalists: 1982

== Recent seasons ==
- Seasons in Nemzeti Bajnokság I: 45
- Seasons in Nemzeti Bajnokság I/B: 1

=== In European competition ===
Source: kézitörténelem.hu

- Participations in Champions League (Champions Cup): 8
- Participations in EHF Cup (IHF Cup): 3
- Participations in Cup Winners' Cup (IHF Cup Winners' Cup): 3

| Season | Competition | Round | Club | Home | Away | Aggregate |
|---|---|---|---|---|---|---|
| 1962–63 | Champions Cup* | 1/8-finals | (Romania) Rapid București | 2–4 | 6–16 | 8–20 |
| 1963–64 | Champions Cup* | Round 1 | (Austria) Admira Wien | 23–7 | 14–7 | 37–14 |
| 1963–64 | Champions Cup* | 1/4-finals | (Soviet Union) Trud Moscow | 16–7 | 8–12 | 24–21 |
| 1963–64 | Champions Cup* | 1/2-finals | (Romania) Rapid București | 7–11 | 5–13 | 12–24 |
| 1964–65 | Champions Cup*; Finalist | Round 1 | (Poland) Ruch Königshütte Chorzów | 16–3 | 17–8 | 33–11 |
| 1964–65 | Champions Cup*; Finalist | 1/4-finals | (Soviet Union) Trud Moscow | 10–7 | 7–9 | 17–16 |
| 1964–65 | Champions Cup*; Finalist | 1/2-finals | (Socialist Federal Republic of Yugoslavia) Lokomotiva Zagreb | 7–4 | 7–6 | 14–10 |
| 1964–65 | Champions Cup*; Finalist | Finals | (Denmark) HG København | 10–7 | 6–14 | 16–21 |
| 1965–66 | Champions Cup* | 1/4-finals | (Bulgaria) VIF G.Dimitrov Sofia | 13–2 | 5–8 | 18–10 |
| 1965–66 | Champions Cup* | 1/2-finals | (East Germany) SC Leipzig | 5–3 | 4–10 | 9–13 |
| 1966–67 | Champions Cup* | Round 1 | (Bulgaria) Akademik Sofia | 15–5 | 5–3 | 20–8 |
| 1966–67 | Champions Cup* | 1/4-finals | (Soviet Union) Žalgiris Kaunas | 8–7 | 8–11 | 16–18 |
| 1980–81 | Cup Winners' Cup; Winner | 1/8-finals | (Czechoslovakia) Štart Bratislava | 20–15 | 11–13 | 31–28 |
| 1980–81 | Cup Winners' Cup; Winner | 1/4-finals | (East Germany) ASK Vorwärts Frankfurt | 17–12 | 11–15 | 28–27 |
| 1980–81 | Cup Winners' Cup; Winner | 1/2-finals | (Bulgaria) Kremikovski | 16–13 | 27–21 | 43–34 |
| 1980–81 | Cup Winners' Cup; Winner | Finals | (Socialist Federal Republic of Yugoslavia) Bane Sekulić Sombor | 22–17 | 18–17 | 40–34 |
| 1981–82 | Cup Winners' Cup; Finalist | 1/8-finals | (Romania) Terom Iaşi | 24–15 | 19–25 | 43–40 |
| 1981–82 | Cup Winners' Cup; Finalist | 1/4-finals | (Czechoslovakia) Štart Bratislava | 27–19 | 22–29 | 49–48 |
| 1981–82 | Cup Winners' Cup; Finalist | 1/2-finals | (Soviet Union) Rostselmash Rostov | 23–19 | 27–31 | 50–50 (a) |
| 1981–82 | Cup Winners' Cup; Finalist | Finals | (Socialist Federal Republic of Yugoslavia) RK Osijek | 21–27 | 17–27 | 38–54 |
| 1982–83 | Champions Cup* | Round 1 | (Greece) Aris Nikaias | 48–9 | 42–6 | 90–15 |
| 1982–83 | Champions Cup* | 1/8-finals | (Denmark) AIA-Tranbjerg | 21–15 | 17–15 | 38–30 |
| 1982–83 | Champions Cup* | 1/4-finals | (Hungary) Vasas SC | 16–21 | 16–14 | 32–35 |
| 1984–85 | Champions Cup* | 1/8-finals | (Romania) Știința Bacău | 31–27 | 22–29 | 53–56 |
| 1985–86 | Cup Winners' Cup | 1/8-finals | (East Germany) TSC Berlin | 23–23 | 25–32 | 48–55 |
| 1986–87 | IHF Cup* | 1/8-finals | (Sweden) Stockholmspolisens | 26–19 | 21–21 | 47–40 |
| 1986–87 | IHF Cup* | 1/4-finals | (Netherlands) HV Vonk Mosam | 29–22 | 18–18 | 47–40 |
| 1986–87 | IHF Cup* | 1/2-finals | (Czechoslovakia) Štart Bratislava | 31–23 | 18–27 | 49–50 |
| 1987–88 | Champions Cup* | Round 1 | (Turkey) Kulübü Ankara | 46–14 | 25–16 | 71–30 |
| 1987–88 | Champions Cup* | 1/8-finals | (Italy) Sardinia Sassari | 40–18 | 34–18 | 74–36 |
| 1987–88 | Champions Cup* | 1/4-finals | (France) USM Gagny | 32–23 | 24–28 | 56–51 |
| 1987–88 | Champions Cup* | 1/2-finals | (Soviet Union) Spartak Kyiv | 25–27 | 25–36 | 50–63 |
| 1988–89 | IHF Cup* | 1/8-finals | (Socialist Federal Republic of Yugoslavia) Budućnost Titograd | 31–28 | 31–34 | 62–62 (a) |
| 1988–89 | IHF Cup* | 1/4-finals | (Austria) Union CA Hollabrunn | 23–20 | 30–19 | 53–39 |
| 1988–89 | IHF Cup* | 1/2-finals | (Romania) Chimistul Râmnicu Vâlcea | 29–26 | 25–34 | 54–60 |
| 1989–90 | IHF Cup* | 1/8-finals | (Spain) CM Leganés | 28–14 | 19–20 | 47–34 |
| 1989–90 | IHF Cup* | 1/4-finals | (Norway) Nordstrand IF | 25–15 | 27–28 | 52–43 |
| 1989–90 | IHF Cup* | 1/2-finals | (East Germany) Vorwärts Frankfurt | 21–23 | 9–26 | 30–49 |
