= 2016–17 Ukrainian Men's Handball Super League =

Superleague
- Season: 2016–17
- Champions: HC Motor Zaporizhzhia (5th title)
- All statistics correct as of 16 May 2017.

The 2016–17 Superleague is the 26th season of the Ukrainian Men's Handball Super League, Ukrainian's top-tier handball league. A total of eight teams contest this season's league, which began on 2 September 2016 and is scheduled to conclude in May 2017. HC Motor Zaporizhzhia are the defending champions.

== Format ==
The competition format for the 2016–17 season consists of eight teams playing in twice home-and-away round-robin system for a total of 28 games for each team, and following play-off round.

== Teams ==
2016–17 Superleague teams

The following 8 clubs compete in the Superleague during the 2016–17 season.

| Team | City | Arena |
|---|---|---|
| HC Motor Zaporizhzhia | Zaporizhzhia | Yunost Sport Hall |
| ZTR Zaporizhzhia | Zaporizhzhia | Palace of Sports "ZTR" |
| HC ZNTU-ZAB Zaporizhzhia | Zaporizhzhia | Palace of Sports "ZAB" |
| CSKA Kyiv | Kyiv | |
| Shakhtar-Academiya | Donetsk | |
| NAEC Netishyn | Netishyn | |
| ZTR Burevisnyk | Zaporizhzhia | Palace of Sports "ZTR" |
| Lviv Polytechnic | Lviv | |

== Standings ==
| Pos | Team | Pld | W | D | L | GF | GA | GD | Pts |
|---|---|---|---|---|---|---|---|---|---|
| 1 | HC Motor Zaporizhzhia | 28 | 28 | 0 | 0 | 1136 | 546 | +590 | 56 |
| 2 | ZTR Zaporizhzhia | 28 | 24 | 0 | 4 | 963 | 604 | +359 | 48 |
| 3 | HC ZNTU-ZAB Zaporizhzhia | 28 | 17 | 1 | 10 | 830 | 736 | +94 | 35 |
| 4 | CSKA Kyiv | 28 | 15 | 1 | 12 | 752 | 809 | −57 | 31 |
| 5 | Shakhtar-Academiya | 28 | 10 | 1 | 17 | 713 | 833 | −120 | 21 |
| 6 | NAEC Netishyn | 28 | 9 | 0 | 19 | 740 | 988 | −248 | 18 |
| 7 | ZTR Burevisnik | 28 | 7 | 0 | 21 | 676 | 786 | −110 | 14 |
| 8 | Lviv Polytechnic | 28 | 0 | 1 | 27 | 552 | 1060 | −508 | 1 |

Source: Ukrainian Superleague

== Results ==
| Home \ Away | BUR | CSK | LVI | MOT | NAE | SHA | ZNT | ZTR | BUR | CSK | LVI | MOT | NAE | SHA | ZNT | ZTR |
|---|---|---|---|---|---|---|---|---|---|---|---|---|---|---|---|---|
| ZTR Burevisnik | | 30–31 | 29–23 | 17–39 | 23–24 | 25–24 | 21–24 | 22–25 | | 20–21 | 37–20 | 21–29 | 35–18 | 28–24 | 23–28 | 21–28 |
| CSKA Kyiv | 28–22 | | 40–19 | 23–34 | 40–36 | 33–32 | 24–19 | 20–38 | 28–24 | | 24–24 | 23–34 | 46–26 | 36–28 | 17–18 | 22–38 |
| Lviv Polytechnic | 21–23 | 26–34 | | 11–46 | 27–34 | 22–29 | 18–41 | 14–35 | 20–33 | 23–34 | | 14–45 | 22–37 | 23–45 | 21–43 | 18–42 |
| HC Motor Zaporizhzhia | 39–16 | 41–19 | 49–11 | | 60–22 | 40–12 | 31–18 | 33–21 | 36–26 | 44–14 | 43–13 | | 46–16 | 45–15 | 42–20 | 36–24 |
| NAEC Netishyn | 35–29 | 26–38 | 30–25 | 29–48 | | 26–32 | 27–38 | 21–44 | 33–29 | 30–39 | 35–26 | 15–51 | | 10–0 | 32–42 | 20–37 |
| Shakhtar-Academiya | 30–19 | 30–17 | 38–22 | 19–39 | 26–29 | | 24–30 | 22–38 | 23–22 | 34–26 | 38–26 | 21–43 | 39–24 | | 29–36 | 21–36 |
| HC ZNTU-ZAB Zaporizhzhia | 32–19 | 29–17 | 41–22 | 28–36 | 36–33 | 33–18 | | 19–38 | 25–24 | 18–21 | 48–18 | 25–33 | 35–33 | 30–30 | | 27–31 |
| ZTR Zaporizhzhia | 36–16 | 33–21 | 41–15 | 27–33 | 33–17 | 42–18 | 32–26 | | 42–22 | 33–16 | 46–8 | 26–41 | 42–22 | 33–12 | 22–21 | |

Legend: Blue = home team win; Yellow = draw; Red = away team win.

== Play-off round ==
- Gold medal matches were not played according to regulations due to the difference between first and second teams was more than five points.
  - HC Motor Zaporizhzhia def. ZTR Zaporizhzhia, by default (per regulations)
- Bronze medal matches:
  - HC ZNTU-ZAB Zaporizhzhia def. CSKA Kyiv, 18–17 and 20–17.
