= Olga Peredery =

Ukrainian handball player

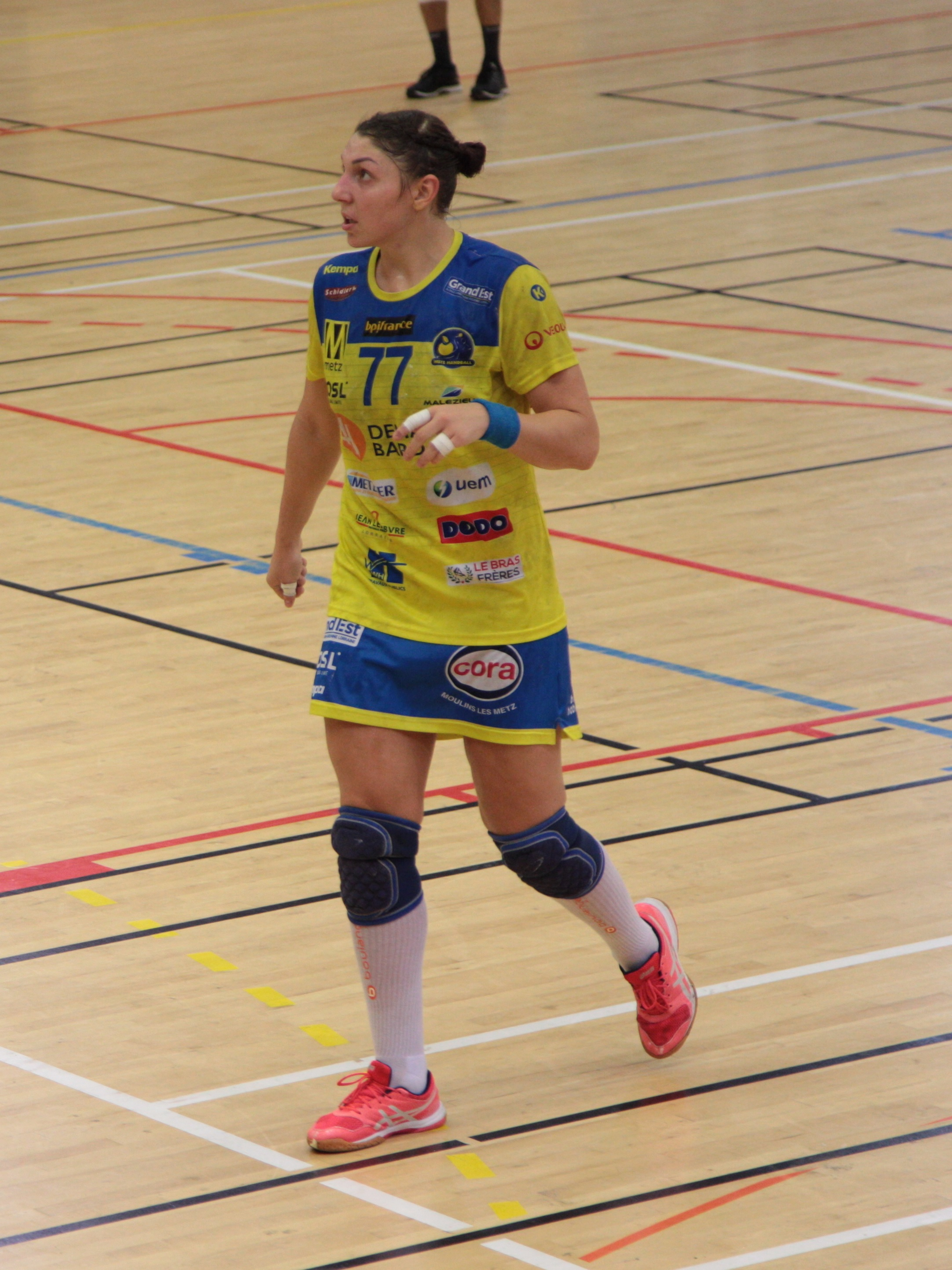
- Olga Perederiy

Personal information
- Nationality: Ukrainian
- Born: April 12, 1994 (age 32) Zaporizhzhia, Ukraine
- Height: 1.80 m (5 ft 11 in)

Sport
- Sport: Handball
- Position: Pivot
- Current club: retired

Senior clubs
- Years: Team
- 2010–2011: HC Motor Zaporizhzhia
- 2011–2012: HC Karpaty Uzhhorod
- 2012–2015: Rostov-Don
- 2015–2017: IUVENTA Michalovce
- 2017–2019: RK Krim
- 2019–2021: Metz Handball
National team
Years	Team	Apps	(Gls)
–	Ukraine	3	(7)

Olga Peredery (born 12 April 1994) is a former Ukrainian handball player for the Ukrainian national team.
