= Viktoriya Tymoshenkova =

Ukrainian handball player

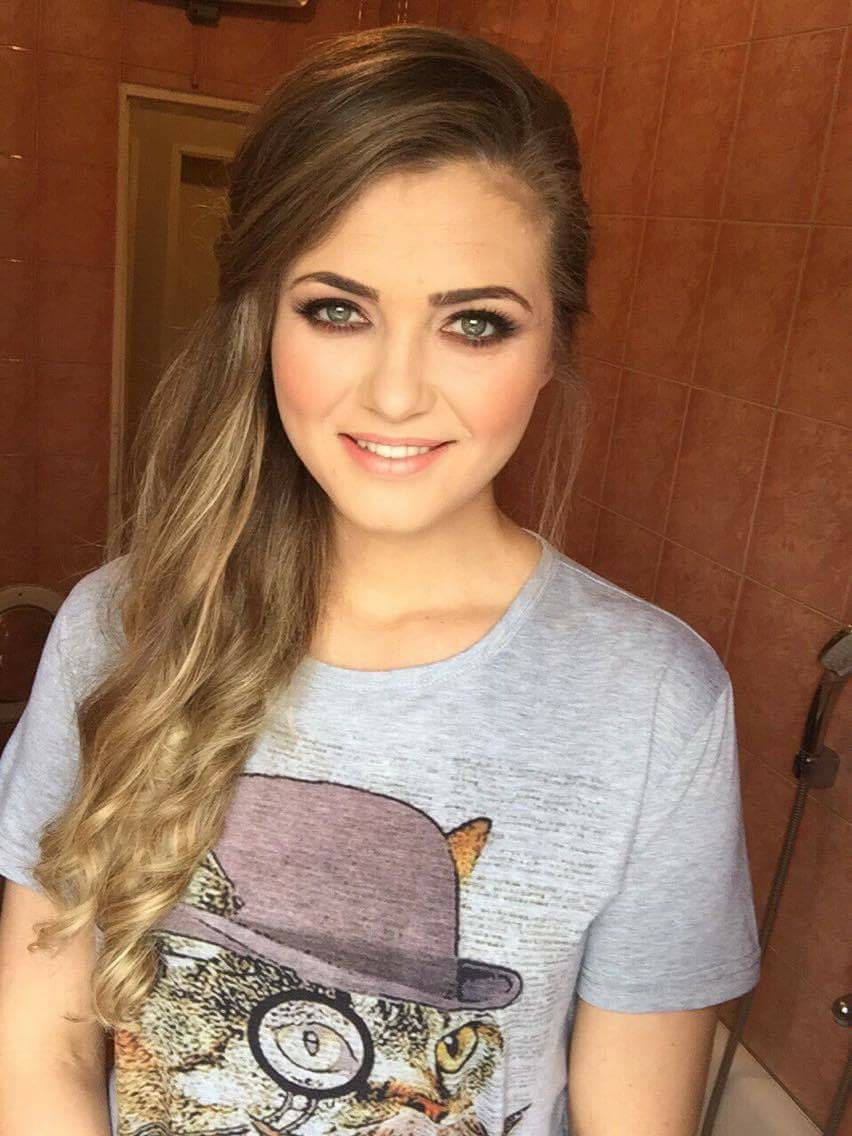

Personal information
- Nationality: Ukrainian
- Born: 4 November 1983 (age 42) Kolomyia, Ukraine
- Height: 1.85 m (6 ft 1 in)

Sport
- Sport: Handball
- Position: Goalkeeper
- Current club: CS Dacia Mioveni 2012
- Number: 16

Senior clubs
- Years: Team
- 2001–2008: HC Galychanka
- 2008–2013: Dinamo Volgograd
- 2013–2014: Istanbul Maltepe Bel.GSK
- 2014–2018: CSM Roman
- 2019–2020: Corona Brașov
- 2021–2023: CSM Slatina
- 2023–: CS Dacia Mioveni 2012
National team
Years	Team	Apps	(Gls)
2005–	Ukraine	36	(0)

Viktoriya Tymoshenkova (born 4 November 1983) is a Ukrainian handball player who plays as a goalkeeper for Liga Națională club CS Dacia Mioveni 2012 and the Ukrainian national team.

== Achievements ==
- Women's EHF Cup:
  - Semifinalist: 2009
- Women's EHF Cup Winners' Cup:
  - Semifinalist: 2012
- Russian Super League:
  - Winner: 2009, 2010, 2011, 2012
- Carpathian Trophy:
  - 2nd Place: 2008
  - 3rd Place: 2010, 2012
- Romanian Cup:
  - 2nd Place: 2016
- Romanian Super Cup:
  - 2nd Place: 2016
- GF World Cup:
  - Semifinalist: 2006
