= Nataliya Savchyn =

Ukraine handball player

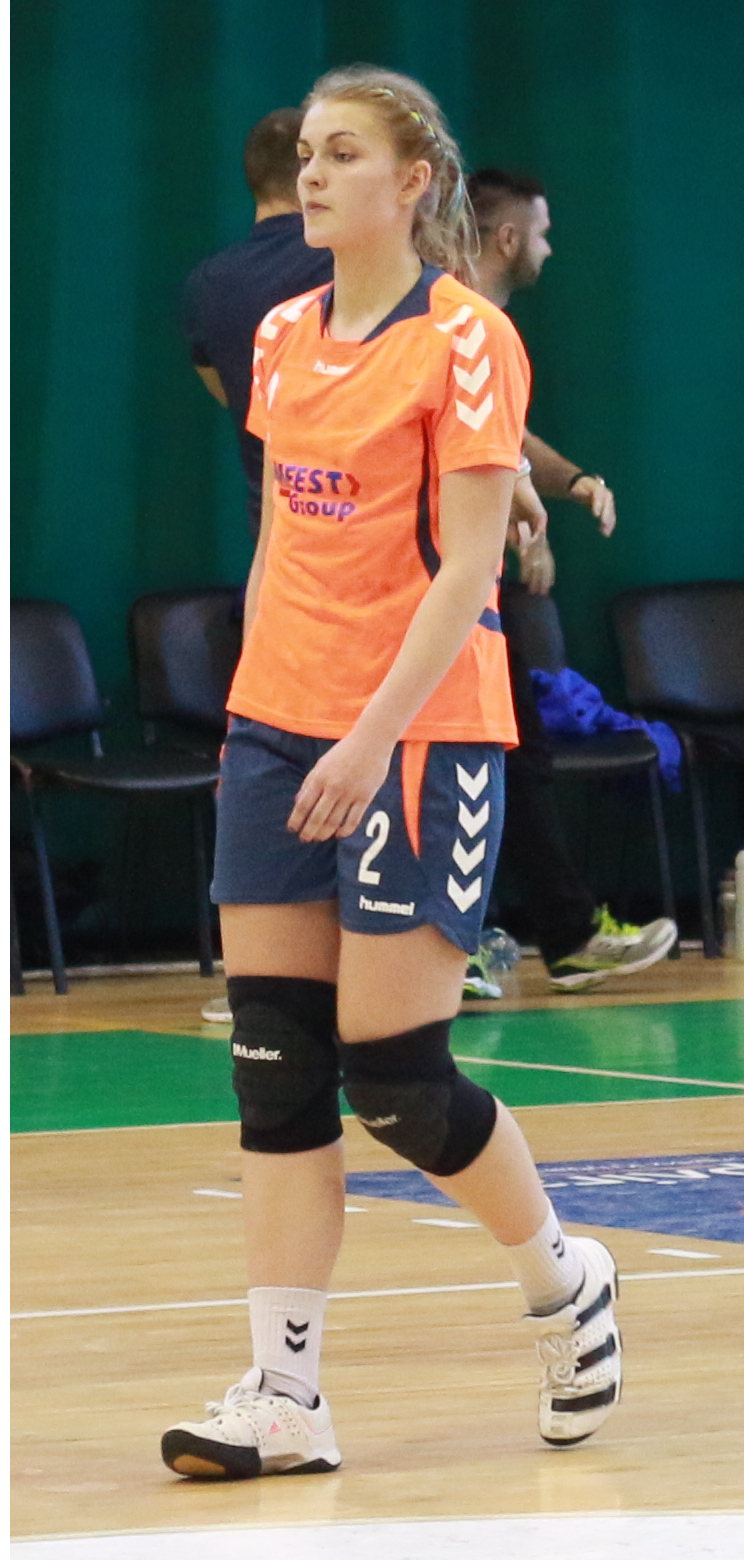

Personal information
- Nationality: Ukrainian
- Born: 18 January 1996 (age 30) Ivano-Frankivsk, Ukraine
- Height: 1.83 m (6 ft 0 in)

Sport
- Sport: Handball
- Position: Left back
- Current club: Gloria Bistrița

Senior clubs
- Years: Team
- 2013–2020: Galychanka Lviv
- 2020–2021: Gloria Bistrița
- 2021–: Kisvárdai KC
National team
- Years: Team
- 2015–: Ukraine

Nataliya Savchyn (born 18 January 1996) is a Ukrainian female handballer who plays as a left back for Gloria Bistrița and the Ukraine national team.

== Achievements ==
- EHF Challenge Cup:
  - Semifinalist: 2014, 2015
- Ukrainian Super League:
  - Winner: 2015, 2016, 2017, 2018, 2019
  - Silver Medalist: 2014
- Ukrainian Super Cup:
  - Winner: 2016, 2017, 2018, 2019
- Ukrainian Cup:
  - Winner: 2016, 2017, 2019
- Baltic League:
  - Winner: 2018, 2020
  - Bronze Medalist: 2017
