= Olesia Semenchenko =

Ukrainian female handballer (born 1979)

Personal information
- Nationality: Ukrainian
- Born: April 27, 1979 (age 47) Brovari, Ternopil Oblast, Ukrainian SSR
- Height: 1.80 m (5 ft 11 in)

Sport
- Sport: Handball
- Position: Goalkeeper
- Current club: Kastamonu Bld.G SK
- Number: 12
National team
- Years: Team
- –: Ukraine

Olesia Anatoliivna Semenchenko (Ukrainian: Олеся Анатоліївна Семенченко; born on April 27, 1979) is a Ukrainian female handballer, who plays as a goalkeeper in the Turkish Women's Handball Super League for Kastamonu Bld. GSK and the Ukrainian national team.

Semenchenko played in her country for Automobilist Brovary (1997–1999), Karpaty Uzhhorod (2000–2001), Transportnyk" Brovary (2001–2002), HC Spartak Kyiv (2002–2004) and HC Galychanka (2007–2009) before she moved in 2009 to Greece to join Ormi Patras, where she was until 2012. In the 2015–16 season, she transferred to Turkey for Kastamonu Bld. GSK.
