= Semenchenko =

Semenchenko (Ukrainian: Семенченко) is a surname of Ukrainian-language origin. Notable people with the surname include:

- Natalya Semenchenko (born 1979), Ukrainian journalist
- Olesia Semenchenko (born 1979), Ukrainian handballer
- Semen Semenchenko (born 1974), Ukrainian politician
