= HC Galychanka =

Ukrainian women's handball club

Galychanka
- Full name: Galychanka-LNU
- Founded: 1989; 37 years ago
- Arena: Sports complex of Lviv University; Galychyna sports palace
- Capacity: 893 (Galychyna)
- President: Roman Fedyshyn
- Head coach: Vitaliy Andronov
- League: Ukrainian Women's Handball Super League; Polish Women's Handball Superliga (2022—2024)
- 2023/24: 1
- Club colours
Home	Away

Galychanka is a women's handball club from Lviv, Ukraine. It was established in 1989.

== Honours ==
- Ten-time champion (2015, 2016, 2017, 2018, 2019, 2020, 2021, 2022, 2023, 2024), five-time silver medalist (2005, 2007, 2008, 2013, 2014) and seven-time bronze medalist Ukrainian Women's Handball Super League
- Seven-time Ukrainian Cup winner (2016, 2017, 2019, 2020, 2021, 2023, 2024)
- Five-time Ukrainian Super Cup winner (2016, 2017, 2018, 2019, 2021)
- Two-time champion of Baltic League (2018, 2020), bronze medalist of Baltic League (2017)

== History ==
=== 1989–2014 ===
History of Lviv woman's handball team Galychanka dates back to 1989, when club with the same name (before there was professional team Impulse) started playing in the USSR Championship, in its first league. In the first season Galychanka wins first league contest and gets right to play in the premier league of USSR handball championship. In the major league team successfully played to the dissolution of the Soviet Union. Thus, since 1992, when Ukraine was organized its own championship, Galychanka was one of the best teams in Ukraine. This allowed the team to participate in European club cup tournament: Women's EHF Cup. Thus, despite the poor financial situation of the team and the relevant requirements of the European Handball Federation, team Galychanka conducted usually both European cup matches on the rival field.

In the national championship Galychanka has long been the fourth team in the country, and the first season of 1997–1998 Lviv handball-players won bronze medals of the championship of Ukraine. Since 2001 Lviv Galychanka constantly ranked among the three best teams in Ukraine, five times the silver medal-winning Ukrainian Women's Handball Super League, and in 2015 became the champions. Players always cause in national team.

Over the years, the coach was: Volodymyr Garbuz, Vasyl Kozar, Yuriy Basyuk, Olexandr Burnyashov, Yuriy Garkavenko, Vasyl Vogt, Volodymyr Kuksenko, Georgiy Voronov, Valeriy Tishchenko. By November 2015 head coach of the team was Vasyl Kozar. Leading Galychanka players caused junior and youth Ukraine national team.

From 1997 Galychanka trains at the Lviv University sports complex, which is reflected in the club name. New successes Galychanka-LNU were associated with maintaining financial-industrial group Rosan, which since February 2006 takes care the team. Subsequently, in cooperation with Galychanka joined by new partners, including PJSC Kredobank, Concern Galnaftogaz, Shuvar market and PZU Ukraine.

=== 2014–2015 ===
In season 2014–2015 Galychanka went to the semi-final of Women's EHF Challenge Cup. The team won all matches with Virto Kvintus (Netherlands), Amintas Amintau (Greece), Naisa Niš (Serbia). In the semi-final match Galychanka yields Polish team Pogoń Baltica from Szczecin. The team won all matches of Ukrainian Championship season 2014–2015 and became the champions.

In the offseason team left the two leaders. Iryna Stelmakh and Tamara Smbatian will continue his career in Olympia Beskid handball team from Nowy Sącz (Poland).

=== 2015–2016 ===
In the 2015–2016 season the team played in matches Women's EHF Cup. According to bilateral agreements with the command Pristina (Kosovo) both matches 1/32 finals Galychanka was to play in Lviv. However, the team from partly unrecognized republic was denied entry to the territory of Ukraine because the government of Kosovo has no diplomatic relations and agreement on mutual gap citizens with the government of Ukraine. As a result of this incident European Handball Federation was decided to hold matches of 1/32 finals EHF Cup October 23 and 25, 2015 in Kosovo. Galychanka won both matches in Kosovo and went to the 1/16 final. After losing team Muratpaşa Bld. SK with Antalya (Turkey) and played a draw in Lviv Galychanka completes the struggle for EHF Cup.

Even 7 October then head coach Vasily Kozar in an interview Ukrainian Handball Federation official web-site said that he decided to leave his post. After EHF Cup matches Vasyl Kozar finally leave club and for the present not continue coaching career in Ukraine.

By following tours of Ukrainian Women's Handball Super League team prepares Tatiana Stefan, who assisted Vasyl Kozar in prior seasons and teacher of LSCFC Vitaly Nadych.

15 May 2016, Galychanka overcoming HC Dnepryanka Kherson with a score of 27:18 in the first game of the fourth round of Women's Super League play-off and early became the champion of Ukrainian Women's Handball Super League.

20–21 May 2016 Galychanka with four Ukrainian teams participated in the restored Ukrainian Cup, held in Horodenka. In the semi-finals Galychanka won against HC Dnepryanka Kherson and the final won against HC Karpaty Uzhhorod and became a winner of Ukrainian Cup

=== 2016–2017 ===
In season 2016/2017 the second coach became Angela Savchenko, who played for Galychanka in 2005–2008 and 2009–2010. Coaching tandem Stefan-Savchenko – the only female in the Ukrainian Superleague.

Also in the offseason team strengthened students of LSCFC: Alexandra Zholobovych, Tatiana Poliak, Tatiana Cherep, Juliana Bratkovska and Natalia Kotsab'yuk. From Uzhhorod HC Karpaty Uzhhorod returned Olena Kosik. In season 2016/2017 was the second coach Angela Savchenko, who in 2005–2008 and 2009–2010, played for Galychanka. Coaching tandem Stefan–Savchenko – the only female in the Ukrainian Super League. In this season, in addition to Ukrainian Superleague team participate in the EHF Cup, the Baltic League and Ukrainian Handball Cup.

28 August 2016, in Kherson was played first Ukrainian Handball Supercup. Having won a HC Dnepryanka Kherson with a score of 23:44 (12:20) Galychanka becomes the owner of the first Ukrainian Supercup. Also the best Supercup player considered Galychanka player Maryna Konovalova.

17 and 18 September Galychanka played in Lviv both matches of the first qualifying round of the EHF Cup. The rival team was Pogoń Baltica Szczecin from Poland, who played with Galychanka in EHF Challenge Cup semi-final 2014/15. Having won in the first match with a score 24:22 and losing the second game with a score 24:20 Galychanka cease participation in the EHF Cup 2016/17.

In January 2017 team has strengthened the former leader of Ternopil Economic University Ilona Gaykova.

Even in the second final round of Ukrainian Superleague Galychanka became unattainable for nearest rivals. Victory over HC Dnepryanka Kherson and HC Karpaty Uzhhorod in the third final round held in Lviv only proved three-times winner status.

==== Baltic League ====
In the first round of the Baltic League, Galychanka beat all rivals: BNTU-Byelaz (Minsk, Belarus), HC Gomel (Gomel, Belarus), Horodnichanka (Grodno, Belarus), Žalgiris (Kaunas, Lithuania) and the HC Garliava (Garliava, Lithuania)

In the second round of the Baltic League, which held 28–30 October 2016 in Lviv Galychanka played draw with BNTU-Byelaz and defeated other rivals. After the second round Galychanka continues to lead the league table.

In the third round of the Baltic League Galychanka lost GC Gomel and played a draw with BNTU-Byelaz.

After first four rounds Galychanka continues to lead the standings and ahead of nearest rival – BNTU-Byelaz by 1 point.

In the debut championship team wins bronze medals.

=== 2017–2018 ===
In the offseason three of the leading handball players – goalkeeper Yelyzaveta Hilyazetdinova, right wing and captain Lesya Smolinh and right back Olesia Parandii have signed contracts with foreign clubs. The most experienced player – Natalya Turkalo and 22 years old Viktoriya Sidletska has finished their game career. Anastasia Dorozhivska decided to start a coaching career. Iryna Stelmakh returns to Lviv, which terminated the contract with the Polish club "Olympia Beskid" after a shoulder injury and rehabilitation in Ukraine.

The season started in Lviv 5 September 2017, by match for the Ukrainian Super Cup. Last year's winner – Galychanka won the HC Dnepryanka Kherson with a score 34:23 (18:11).

2017 Galychanka finished with wins in all 14 matches with allowance of seven points from the nearest opponent – Karpaty(Uzhhorod).

The Baltic Women's Handball League 2017/2018 Final was scheduled to take place in Lviv, but the participating teams decided to complete the championship after the fourth round of the tournament. The prize-winners of the championship are determined by the number of points earned in the played tours. Galychanka, which led the whole season in the tournament table, won the gold medals.

Before Superleague final round team having won 45 points and provides for himself the fourth consecutive gold medals, as the advance from the closest pursuer – Karpaty made 13 points. In the Superleague final round that was held in Lviv, Galychanka pleased fans with a victory over the HC Dnepryanka Kherson with a score 34:23 and a fighting draw 28:28 with the Karpaty Uzhhorod.

Shortly after the end of the season, the management of the club canceled contracts with coaches Tatyana Stefan and Anzhela Savchenko. New trainer was a senior teacher of the handball faculty Lviv State School of Physical Culture Vasyl Kozar, who trained Galychanka in 2007–2015.

=== 2018–2019 ===
From 6 June till 10 June 2018, Galychanka participated in the Ukrainian Women's Beach Handball Championship, where they won silver awards. Honor of the club was defended by: Victoria Saltanyuk, Nataliia Volovnyk, Diana Dmitrishin, Julia Golovko, Anastasiia Baranovych, Maryana Markevich, Olga Vasyliyka and former Galychanka playmaker Yelyzaveta Hilyazetdinova (AZERYOL, Baku), which was recognized as the best competition goalkeeper, Olexandra Zholobovych (Marta, Romania) and Anastasiia Dorozhivska which began a coaching career. Trainer of the beach handball team was Vitaliy Nadich.

Subsequently, team left four leading handball players: Nataliia Volovnyk and Nataliia Stryukova went to the Polish club AZS Politechnika Koszalin, Maryna Konovalova went to the Azerbaijani club AZERYOL (Baku), Nataliya Sabova has completed the game career for family reasons. They were replaced by the graduates and students of this year Lviv State School of Physical Culture: Angelina Ovcharenko, Maryna Valieva, Valentyna Froliak, Katerina Kozak, Olga Bratkovska, Diana Dmytryshyn

In October 2018, Oleksandra Furmanets moved from Uzhhorod Karpaty to Galychanka.

On 4 March 2019, club terminated his contract with Vasyl Kozar. Until the end of the season the team was headed by Vitaliy Andronov, who at one time was the head coach of Ukraine's men's handball team. Second, and later the head coach, was appointed Tatiana Stefan, who coached Galichanka in previous seasons.

After completing the second round of the second stage, Galichanka outstrips the nearest rival by 11 points and ahead of schedule become Ukraine champions. The most points for the season were brought to her team by Ilona Haikova. She has 166 goals in 22 matches in the Women's Handball 2018—2019 Championship.

=== 2019–2020 ===
Five top handball players left team in the offseason – Ilona Katusova (Haikova), Sofiia Davydyants, Diana Kolodiychak and Tatiana Cherep completed their playing careers, Iryna Stelmakh move to HC Gomel.

Season started with a match for the Ukrainian Supercup against the silver medalist of the last Ukrainian championship season – Uzhhorod Karpaty. Galychanka defended the title of Ukrainian Supercup winners. In October 2019, returns Maria Konovalova, who spent last season in the Baku AZERYOL team.

The first stage of the Ukrainian handball championship 2019–2020 team finished at the first place with 19 wins and one defeat from Uzhhorod Karpaty. In March 2020, the Handball Federation of Ukraine paused all competitions, and on 3 June, due to quarantine restrictions and the impossibility of participating 12 and 13 rounds of Ukrainian Women's Handball Super League, Handball Federation of Ukraine was decided to end the championship. The winners were determined by the results of the first stage of the championship. Thus, Galychanka became the sixth time Ukraine champions.

Galychanka started fighting for the Women's EHF Cup in the third qualifying round against Azeryol (Baku, Azerbaijan). In the second round met with Magura (Cisnădie, Romania). Having won in the third-round games by a margin of seven goals and losing 3 goals in the second round, Galychanka eliminates from the fight for EHF Cup.

=== 2020—2021 ===
In the off-season, captain Nataliya Savchyn moved to the Romanian club CS Gloria (Bistrița). A new captain was elected Tetiana Poliak. On 21 June 2020, club invited Vitaliy Andronov to the position of head coach. Assistant coaches: Tetiana Shtefan and Oksana Ploshchynska (goalkeeper coach).

On 13 September 2020, the team defended the title of Ukrainian Cup winners, and on 5 June 2021, they won the Ukrainian Cup for the fifth time.

In the spring of 2021, 6 players of the team, namely: goalkeepers Mariia Gladun and Victoria Saltaniuk, court players Maryana Markevich, Anastasia Melekestseva, Tetyana Poliak and Diana Dmytryshyn as part of the national team participated in the qualification games for 2021 World Women's Handball Championship.

In the final, third round of the second stage the team wins matches against HC Real Mykolaiv and HC Karpaty Uzhhorod, and confirms the status of seven-time champion of Ukraine.

==== European Cup ====
In the 2020–2021 season, Galychanka took part in the Women's EHF European Cup draw. In the 1/16 finals matches team won twice with scores of 33:17 and 23:18 ŽRK Kumanovo of Northern Macedonia. In the 1/8 finals the draw brought Galychanka with the Belarusian team HC Victoria-Berestie. Lviv team won twice with scores of 32:26 and 29:16. In the quarterfinals, Galychanka played with the Spanish team CB Atlético Guardés. After losing the home match 16:24 and drawing 24:24 on the road, Lviv team is eliminated from the tournament for the European Cup 2021.

=== 2021—2022 ===
In the off-season, three players left the team: goalkeeper Mariia Gladun signed a contract with a Füchse Berlin (Germany), Daryna Lyakhovenko start this season in Lviv Polytechnic-LPSC team, Oleksandra Furmanets moved to Kyiv for family reasons. Instead, from Ternopil team WUNU-Energo-HSS came goalkeeper Sofiia Humeniuk, center back player Sofiia Holinska from Kyiv and former HC Lviv Polytechnic-LPSC players Yuliia Maksymeiko (left back), Liudmyla Martyniuk (right wing).

On 2 September 2021, in the Ukrainian Supercup match Galychanka won a HC Dnepryanka Kherson with a score of 31:20 and defended a title of sole Supercup holder.

In October 2021, 6 players of the team, namely: Iryna Prokopyak, Maryna Konovalova, Maryana Markevich, Anastasia Melekestseva, Tetyana Poliak and Diana Dmytryshyn as part of the national team participated in qualifying matches of 2022 European Women's Handball Championship. Also, in June 2021, the head coach of Galychanka Vitaliy Andronov was approved for the position of head coach of the Ukraine women's national handball team.

In January 2022, team invited goalkeeper Maryna Valiieva, who in the first half of the 2021–2022 season played for HC Spartak Kyiv, and in previous seasons defended the goal of Galychanka and Lviv Polytechnic-LPSC teams.

Because of the Russian invasion players and coach Tatiana Shtefan were forced to move to the Czech city of Hodonín, where for two months she trained together with HC Hodonín and played a charity friendly match with them.

On 26 April 2022, at a meeting of the Committee of Handball Federation of Ukraine decided to end the championship and determine the final places of the teams according to the tournament table as of 24 February 2022 — Galychanka won the eighth championship in a row.

==== European Cup ====
In the 2021–2022 season, Galychanka took part in the Women's EHF European Cup draw. In the 1/32 finals matches (second qualifying round), which took place in Lviv on 16–17 October 2021, Galychanka played with the team HC Hodonín from Czech. Galychanka won in both matches and advanced to the European Cup third round.

1/16 finals matches team played against IUVENTA Michalovce (Slovakia). The first leg took place 14 November 2021, in Lviv, the second leg – 21 November in Michalovce. According to the sum of goals in two matches, Galychanka wins with a score of 45:44 and reaches the 1/8 finals.

In the 1/8 finals the draw brought Galychanka with the team SSV Brixen Südtirol (Bressanone, Italy). The first leg took place 8 January 2022, in Bressanone. The second leg, which was to take place 16 January in Lviv, was canceled due to positive COVID-19 tests of Italian players. The decision of European Handball Federation is that the match will be assessed with 10:0 goals of Galychanka.

One of the two planned quarterfinal matches team played against H71 from Hoyvík, (Faroe Islands). The first match was to take place 13 February 2022, in Lviv, but the H71 team did not arrive in Ukraine the day before. Subsequently, 4 March European Handball Federation decided to count in this match a technical defeat for the team H71. 20 February 2022, in the second match in Tórshavn Galychanka won with a score of 26:27.

In the semi-finals Galychanka will play against the Spanish team Rocasa Gran Canaria. Due to activation full-scaled Russo-Ukrainian War, all players and coach Tetiana Shtefan forced to continue training and preparing to the European Cup games in the Czech city of Hodonín. First leg took place in Hodonín on 26 March 2022, Galychanka won with the score 20:19. The second leg was to 3 April 2022, on the Grand Canary Island. After losing the second game with a score of 34:27 (total score 47:53), Galychanka dropped out of the tournament.

=== 2022—2023 ===
In Ukrainian championship, Galychanka and 5 other participating teams will play 6 rounds according to the conference system.

In July 2022 in Lviv team started preparing for the season. From 25 to 30 July 2022 players, who studying in Lviv State University of Physical Culture namely Viktoriya Saltaniuk, Olga Vasylyaka, namely Viktoriia Saltaniuk, Olga Vasilyaka, Olesya Dyachenko, Sofiia Holinska, Maryana Markevich, Yuliia Holovko, Iryna Prokopyak, Kateryna Kozak, Anastasia Melekestseva, Diana Dmytryshyn, Tetiana Poliak and trainer Vitaly Andronov in the city of Łódź participated in the European University Games. Having won all the matches, the Lviv team won gold medals of the tournament.

In August 2022 goalkeeper Sofiia Humenyuk and point guard Natalya Shiplyak left the team, Olga Vasylyaka and Yuliya Maksymeyko moved to the Czech HC Hodonín. Instead, team invited Kateryna Hayduk, who last season played for Lviv Polytechnic-LPSC, Anastasia Tkach and Kristina Sorokina from HC Dnepryanka Kherson and Vladyslava Slobodian from HC Real Mykolaiv.

From 3 August 2022, Galychanka had a two-week training camp in the city of Tyachiv, Zakarpattia Oblast.

Having achieved 13 victories in 14 matches, Galychanka prematurely secured the championship with two games left in the season.

In the 2023–2024 and 2024–2025 seasons, line player Anastasia Melekestseva and goalkeeper Viktoria Saltanyuk will play for the Polish handball club of the Kobezhycy commune.

==== Polish Women's Superliga ====
This season, Galychanka is participating in the Polish Women's Superliga. Due to the expansion of the championship format from 8 to 10 teams, additional participate licenses in the PGNiG Women's Superleague were granted to Galychanka and the club KPR Ruch Chorzów from the city of Chorzów. Home games Galychanka plays in Marki Educational and Recreation Centre in Warsaw metropolitan area.

Тeam finishes 2022 year, in 5th place in the PGNiG Women's Super League standings, having 18 points to their credit – 6 regular time wins in ten matches.

In December 2022, instead of goalkeeper Maryna Valiyeva, the team invite and Tetyana Mykolyuk and in February 2023 left wing Yuliya Gutnyk, left back Vanessa Lakatosh and point guard Karina Zdrila, who also defend the colors of Lviv Polytechnic-LPSC in the Ukrainian championship.

Galychanka took the 6th place in the tournament table after the end of the main stage and in the final stage enters the group of the drawing of championship awards.

In March 2023 team invites Anna Stadnyk, the goalkeeper of the U-18 beach handball team of Ukraine.

Тeam ends the season on the 6th place in the final standings, having 10 wins and 18 losses.

Club kit in Polish Women's Superliga

==== European Cup ====
In the 2022/2023 season, team participated in the Women's EHF European Cup draw. As past year's semi-finalist of the Cup, Galychanka started from the third round, in which Lviv team was drawn against the Turkish team Konyaalty Antalya. Games were held in Antalya on 3–4 December 2022. After losing both games with a total score of 60:54, Galychanka dropped out of the tournament.

=== 2023—2024 ===
In the offseason, in addition to Anastasia Meleketseva and Victoria Saltaniuk, Vladyslava Slobodian left the team and moved to the HC Karpaty Uzhhorod. Instead, Milana Shukal came from Uzhgorod, from Lviv Polytechnic-LPSC came Yuliya Gutnyk, Anastasia Dutko, Karina Zdrila. Tetiana Mykolyuk will be team's main goalkeeper. After a two-year pause Svitlana Havrysh-Aksyonova will continue her sports career in Galychanka.

Team started preparing for the season on 10 July in Lviv. From 15 July, Galychanka had a two-week training camp in the city of Tyachiv, Zakarpattia region. 19 August 2023 "Galychanka" played against HC Karpaty Uzhhorod in the Ukrainian Super Cup match. Team lost the first half with a score of 14:19, but won in the second half and defended the Super Cup winner title.

Seven players of the team — Tetyana Polyak, Maryana Markevich, Iryna Prokopiak, Olesya Dyachenko, Milana Shukal, Kateryna Kozak and Maryna Konovalova as a part of the national team won the 2023 World Championship, where they took 23rd place.

In January 2024, Alisa Petriv joined the team from HC Karpaty Uzhhorod. She played her first match as part of Galychanka on 14 January in a match vs Start Elblong and scored 2 goals.

From November 2023 to February 2024, Galychanka suffered significant personnel losses, including serious injuries to key players, maternity leave for Maryana Markevich, and the end of Maryna Konovalova's playing career. The recovery process for Diana Dmytryshyn and Milana Shukal's injuries lasted until the end of April 2024.

Galychanka finished the first stage of the Ukrainian championship sitting at the top of the tournament table, with 16 wins and 2 losses. In the second stage, the team won all nine matches, accumulating 75 points – 25 victories in 27 ties. On 24 May 2024, the team officially secured its 10th title as champion of Ukraine.

Players who are studying at LSUPC won the gold medal at the XIX Summer Universiade of Ukraine, which took place in Kyiv from 20 to 23 June 2024.

==== Polish Women's Superliga ====
This season, Galychanka is participating in the Polish Women's Superliga. Team played home matches in the Polish city of Łańcut.

The main stage of the Polish Superliga Galychanka finish in 9th place in the standings, having earned 12 points with 4 wins and 14 losses. With 2 rounds remaining in the Polish championship and sitting in 10th place, 6 points behind the nearest competitor, the Lviv team lost the opportunity to participate in the Polish Suprliga for the 2024–2025 season.

=== 2024—2025 ===
In the 2024–25 season, Galychanka participated in 3 tournaments: the Ukrainian Women's Handball Super League, the Polish Championship and the EHF European Cup.

During the off-season, Sofiia Holinska transferred to the Polish handball club of Kobierzyce municipality. Right back Victoria Malovana, right winger Sofia Zaplatynska, left back Vladyslava Sorokina, line player Sofia Hishchak, and goalkeeper Anzhelika Hrabchak joined from From Lviv Polytechnic-LPSC team. Also, this season sees the return of Maryna Konovalova, who announced her retirement at the end of 2023, and Lesia Smolinh, who will participate with the team in the 2024–25 Women's EHF European Cup matches. The coaching staff for this season: head coach Vitaliy Andronov, assistant coaches Tetyana Shtefan and Vitalii Nadych, goalkeeping coach Andriy Khimyak, doctor Rostyslav Kozakevych, and physiotherapist Yulia Holovko.

In the 2024 Ukrainian Women's Handball Super cup, the team lost to HC Karpaty Uzhhorod. After a 34:34 draw in regular time, the Lviv team was defeated 4:5 in the penalty shootout.

Five players of Galychanka: Mariia Poliak, Vanessa Lakatosh, Iryna Prokopiak, Anastasiia Tkach, and Kateryna Kozak represented the Ukraine women's national handball team at the 2024 European Women's Handball Championship, they suffered defeats in the group stage matches against the national teams of Germany, Iceland, and the Netherlands, finishing 4th in their group and exiting the tournament.

The team ends the 2024 year as the sole leader of the 2024–2025 Ukrainian Women's Handball Super League, achieving 10 victories in 10 matches.

==== Polish Championship ====
Galychanka plays in the Central League of the Polish Championship. The home matches are held at the Recreation and Leisure Center in the village of Cmolas, Kolbuszowa County, Subcarpathian Voivodeship. The team will play 22 matches in this season's championship.

==== EHF European Cup ====
In the 2024–25 season, Galychanka will start the competition in the EHF European Cup from the 2nd round (1/32 final). The draw took place on 16 July 2024, at the EHF headquarters, the opponents of the Galychanka were the team Azeryol from Baku, Azerbaijan. Two-legged ties was held on 5 and 6 October 2024 on AHF Arena in Baku. Galychanka won both matches and advances to the next round of the tournament. In round 3, Galychanka will play against Garabagh team (Baku, Azerbaijan). The matches are scheduled to be held between 9 and 17 November 2024.

- 2nd qualifying round

Azeryol — Galychanka 22:36 (12:15)

Galychanka — Azeryol 32:16 (19:8)

- 3nd qualifying round

Galychanka – Garabagh

Garabagh – Galychanka

== European record ==
Season	Competition	Round	Club	1st leg	2nd leg	Aggregate
2016–17	EHF Cup	R1	(Poland) Pogoń Baltica Szczecin	24–22	20–24	44–46

== Team ==
=== Season 2024—2025 ===
No.	Name	Position	Sports title	National.	Date of birth	Height	Weight
1	Mariia Poliak	goalkeeper	CMSU	Ukraine	15 March 2004	174 cm	83 kg
3	Olesia Diachenko	center back	CMSU	Ukraine	3 February 2003	168 cm	64 kg
4	Karina Zdrila	field player	CMSU	Ukraine	19 March 2006	164 cm	68 kg
5	Viktoriia Malovana	field player	CMSU	Ukraine	20 May 2007	170 cm	60 kg
6	Anastasia Tkach	left back	CMSU	Ukraine	15 June 2004	176 cm	68 kg
7	Maryana Markevich	center back	MSU	Ukraine	5 December 1998	167 cm	63 kg
8	Vladislava Sorokina	field player	CMSU	Ukraine	5 March 2007	173 cm	? kg
9	Vanessa Lakatosh	left back	CMSU	Ukraine	8 June 2006	180 cm	76 kg
10	Anastasiia Dutko	line player	CMSU	Ukraine	8 June 2006	180 cm	76 kg
11	Iryna Prokopyak	line player	MSU	Ukraine	11 June 2003	177 cm	70 kg
12	Anzhelika Hrabchak	goalkeeper	CMSU	Ukraine	6 November 2007	171 cm	74 kg
14	Sofiia Hishchak	line player	CMSU	Ukraine	2 November 2007	177 cm	64 kg
16	Anna Stadnyk	goalkeeper	?	Ukraine	21 December 2004	178 cm	63 kg
18	Alisa Petriv	left wing	MSU	Ukraine	12 February 2003	170 cm	53 kg
19	Maryna Konovalova	left wing	MSU	Ukraine	19 November 1996	171 cm	60 kg
20	Katerina Kozak	left wing	CMSU	Ukraine	12 June 2002	180 cm	68 kg
21	Milana Shukal	right back	MSU	Ukraine	16 August 2001	173 cm	55 kg
23	Sofiia Zaplatynska	right wing	CMSU	Ukraine	15 December 2007	170 cm	50 kg
31	Svitlana Havrysh	left wing	MSU	Ukraine	7 February 1998	175 cm	73 kg
33	Diana Dmitryshyn	right wing/back	MSU	Ukraine	25 April 2002	175 cm	58 kg
57	Lesia Smolinh	field player	MSU	Ukraine	23 January 2002	171 cm	69 kg
77	Tetiana Mykoliuk	goalkeeper	CMSU	Ukraine	1 September 2003	176 cm	62 kg
99	Tetiana Poliak (c)	center back	MSU	Ukraine	27 July 1999	176 cm	61 kg

MSU — Master of Sports of Ukraine; CMSU — Candidate for Master of Sports of Ukraine

== Trainers ==
- (Ukraine) Vitaliy Andronov (04.03.2019—24 May 2019, 21 June 2020—)
- (Ukraine) Vasyl Kozar (to 1 March 2019)
- (Ukraine) Tatiana Shtefan (—09.05.2018, 4 March 2019—)
- (Ukraine) Anzhela Savchenko (2016–09.05.2018, 1 July 2019–06.2020)
- (Ukraine) Oksana Ploshchynska (07.2019—08.2024)
- (Ukraine) Andrii Khimiak (08.2024—)
- (Ukraine) Vitalii Nadych (08.2024—)

== Gallery ==
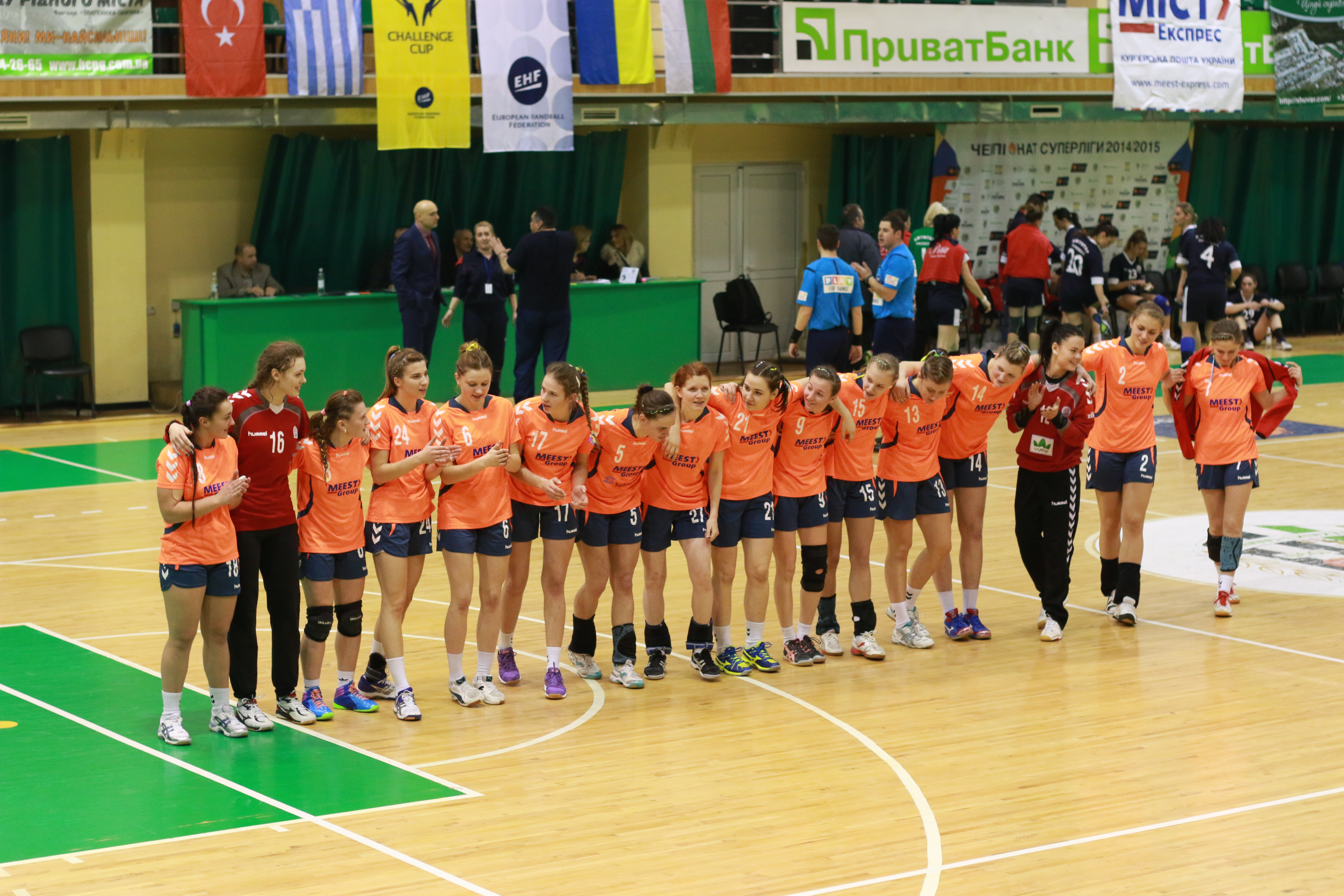
Team in season 2014/2015

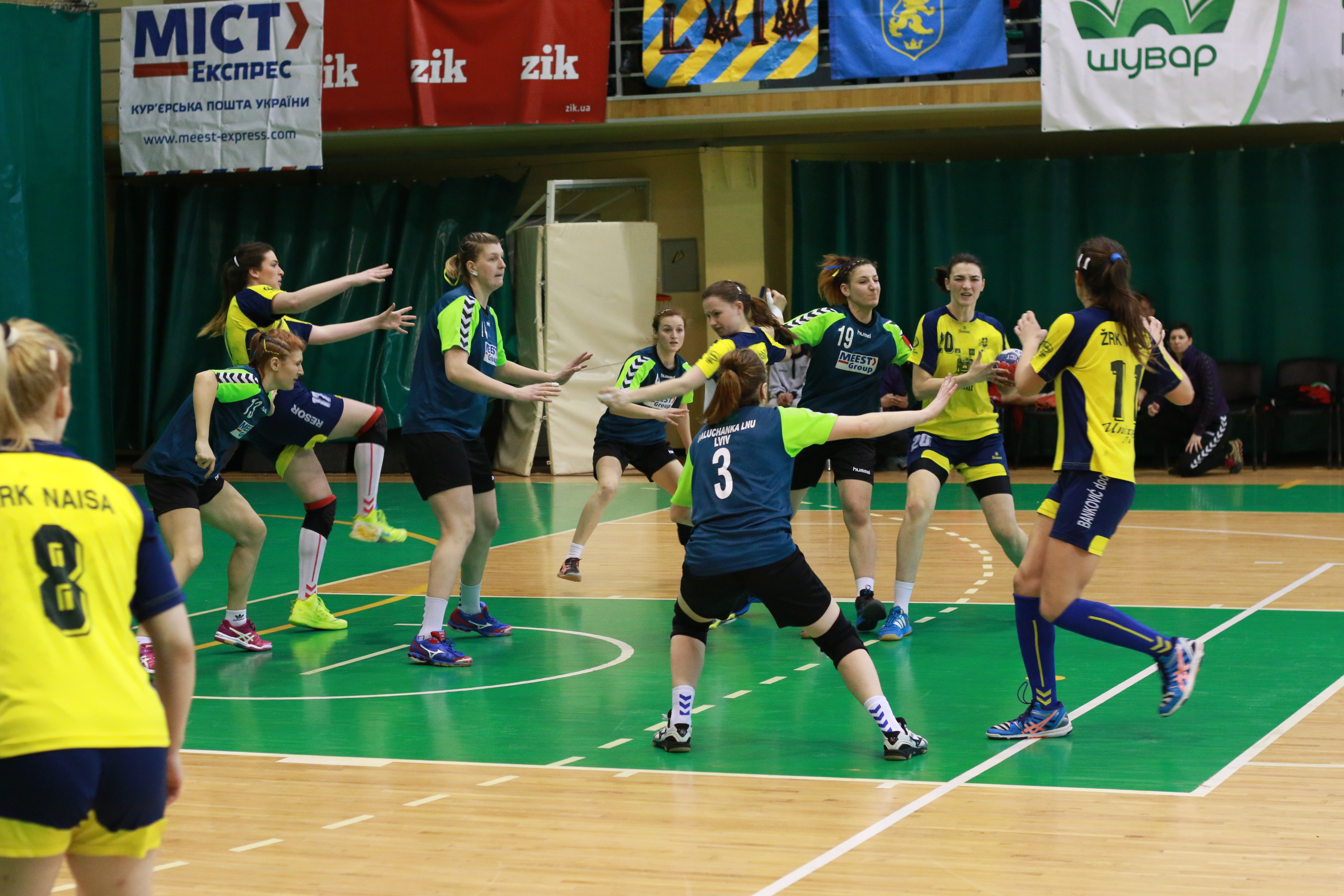
In match vs Naisa Niš (Serbia)

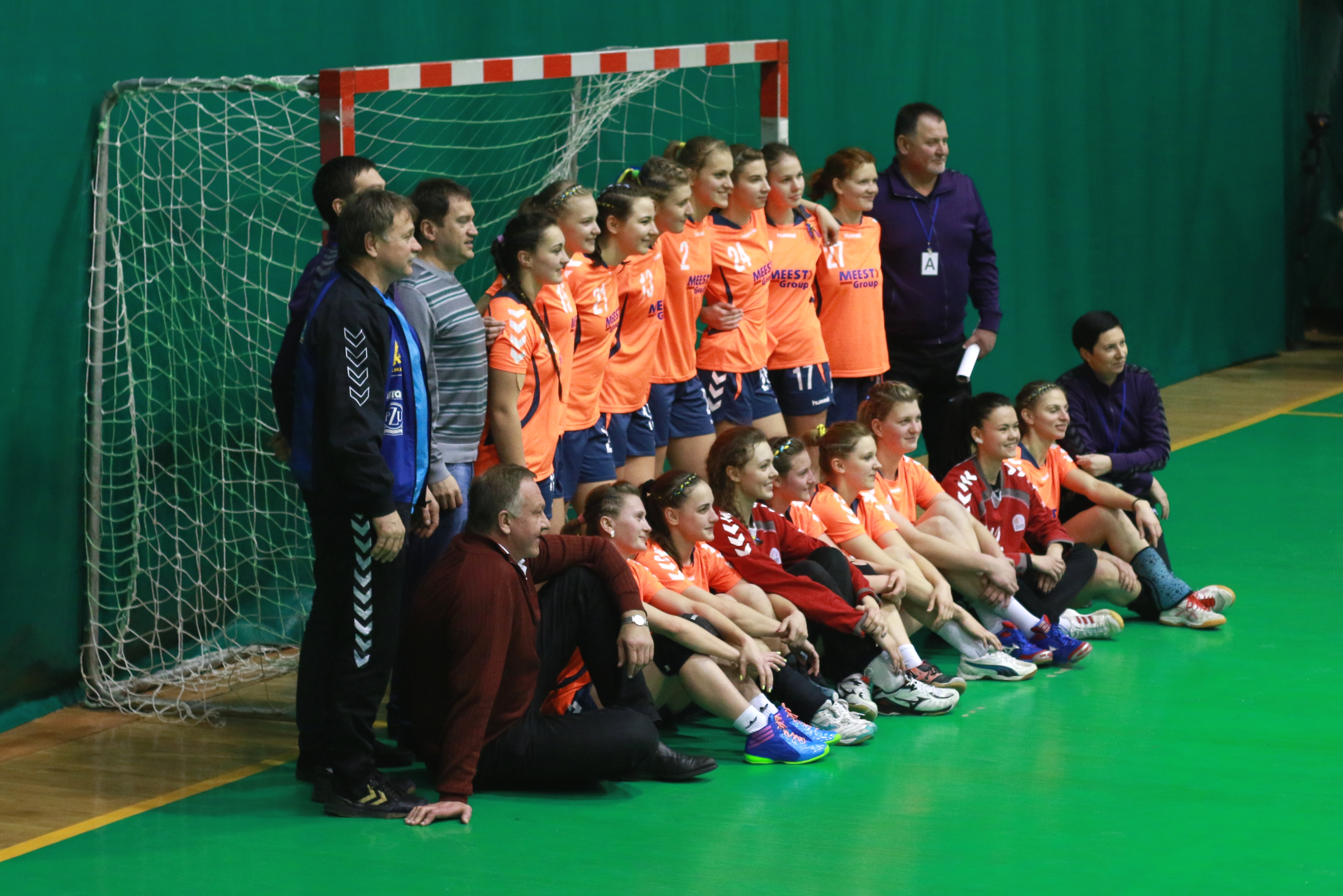
Team in season 2014/2015

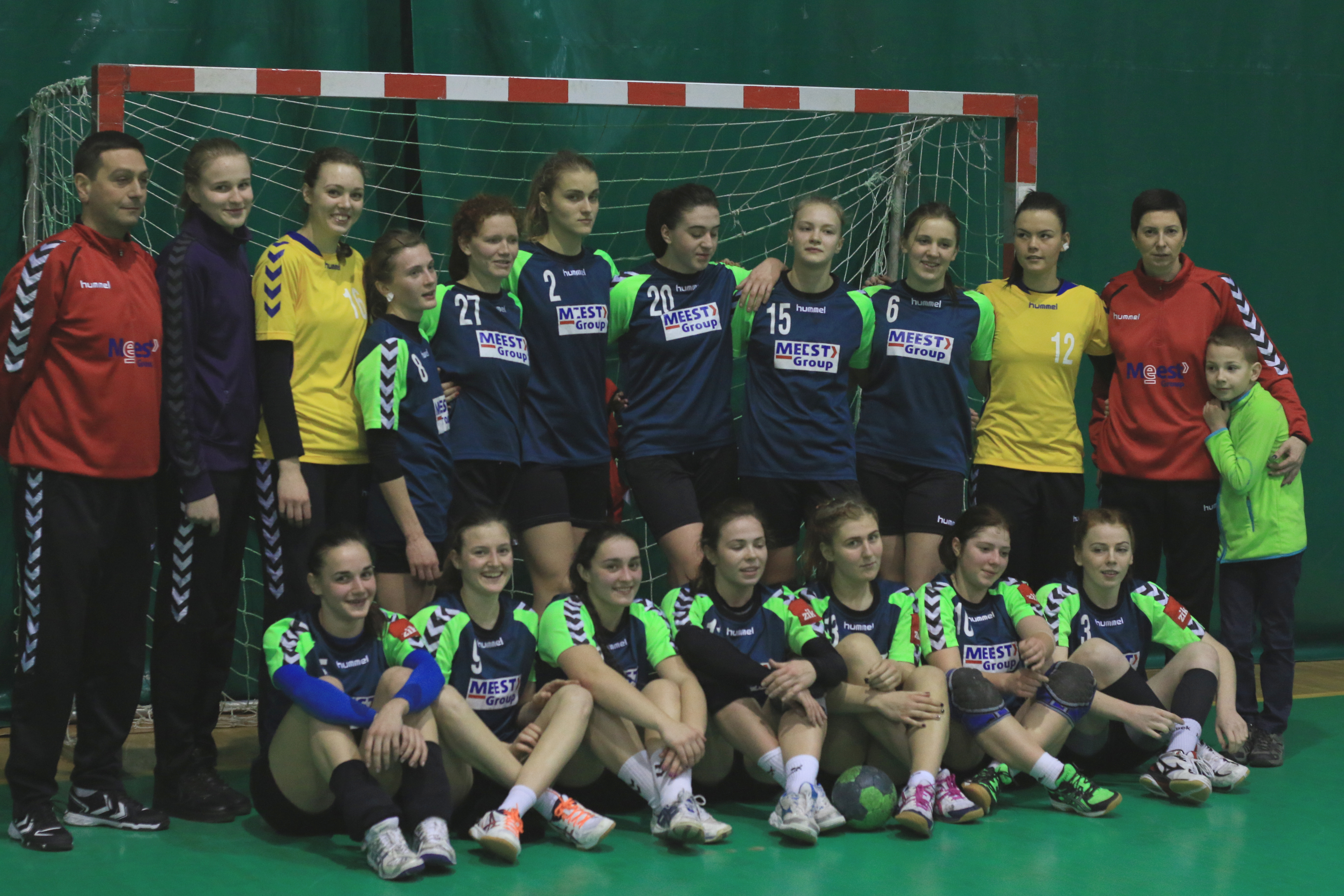
Team in season 2015/2016

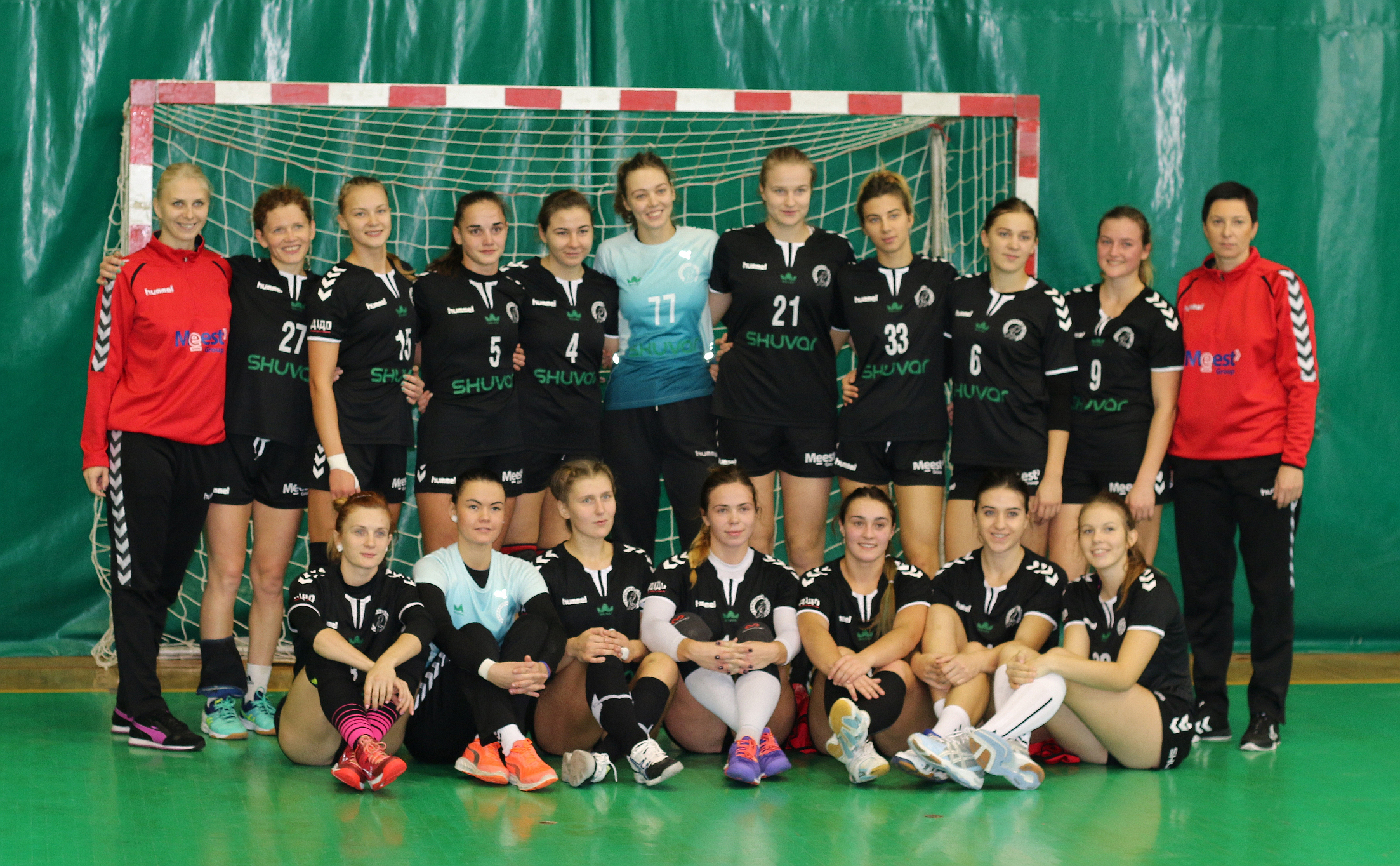
Team in season 2016/2017
