= Maryna Vergelyuk =

Ukrainian handball player

Personal information
- Full name: Maryna Mykolaivna Vergelyuk
- Nationality: Ukrainian
- Born: 24 June 1978 (age 48) Kherson, Ukraine
- Height: 178 cm (70 in)

Sport
- Sport: Handball
- Position: Right wing
- Current club: Retired

Youth career
- Years: Team
- 1988-1995: Dneprynka

Senior clubs
- Years: Team
- 1995-2003: HC Spartak Kyiv
- 2003-2013: RK Krim
National team
Years	Team	Apps	(Gls)
1994-?	Ukraine	137	(480)
Medal record
Representing Ukraine
Women's handball
Olympic Games
Bronze medal – third place	2004 Athens	Team
European Championship
Silver medal – second place	2000 Romania	Team
European Youth Championships
Gold medal – first place	1994 Lithuania	Team
European Junior Championships
Silver medal – second place	1996 Poland	Team

Maryna Vergelyuk (Ukrainian: Марина Миколаївна Вергелюк, born 24 June 1978 in Kherson) is a Ukrainian team handball player. She received a bronze medal with the Ukrainian national team at the 2004 Summer Olympics in Athens.

She played club handball for HC Spartak Kyiv in her home country and RK Krim in Slovenia. With HC Spartak Kyiv she won the Ukrainian Championship in 1992, 1996 and 2000. With RK Krim she reached the final of the Champions League twice, in 2004 and 2006, and won the Slovenian Championship nine times from 2004 to 2013.
