= Yelyzaveta Hilyazetdinova =

Ukrainian handball player

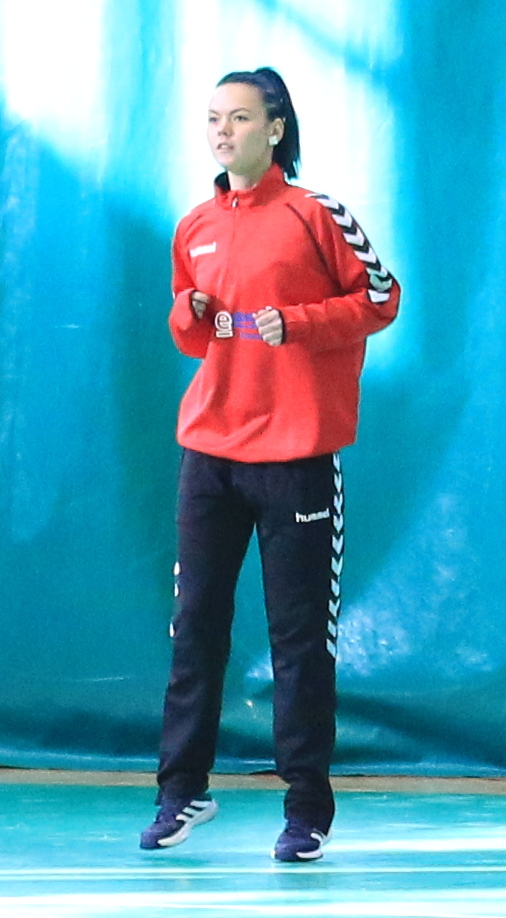

Personal information
- Nationality: Ukrainian
- Born: 15 August 1994 (age 32) Kamianets-Podilskyi, Khmelnytskyi Oblast, Ukraine
- Height: 1.69 m (5 ft 7 in)

Sport
- Sport: Handball
- Position: Goalkeeper
- Current club: SC Galytchanka Lviv
- Number: 12
National team
Years	Team	Apps	(Gls)
–	Ukraine	3	(0)

Yelyzaveta Hilyazetdinova (born 15 August 1994) is a Ukrainian handball player for SC Galytchanka Lviv and the Ukrainian national team.
