= Natalya Turkalo =

Ukrainian handball player

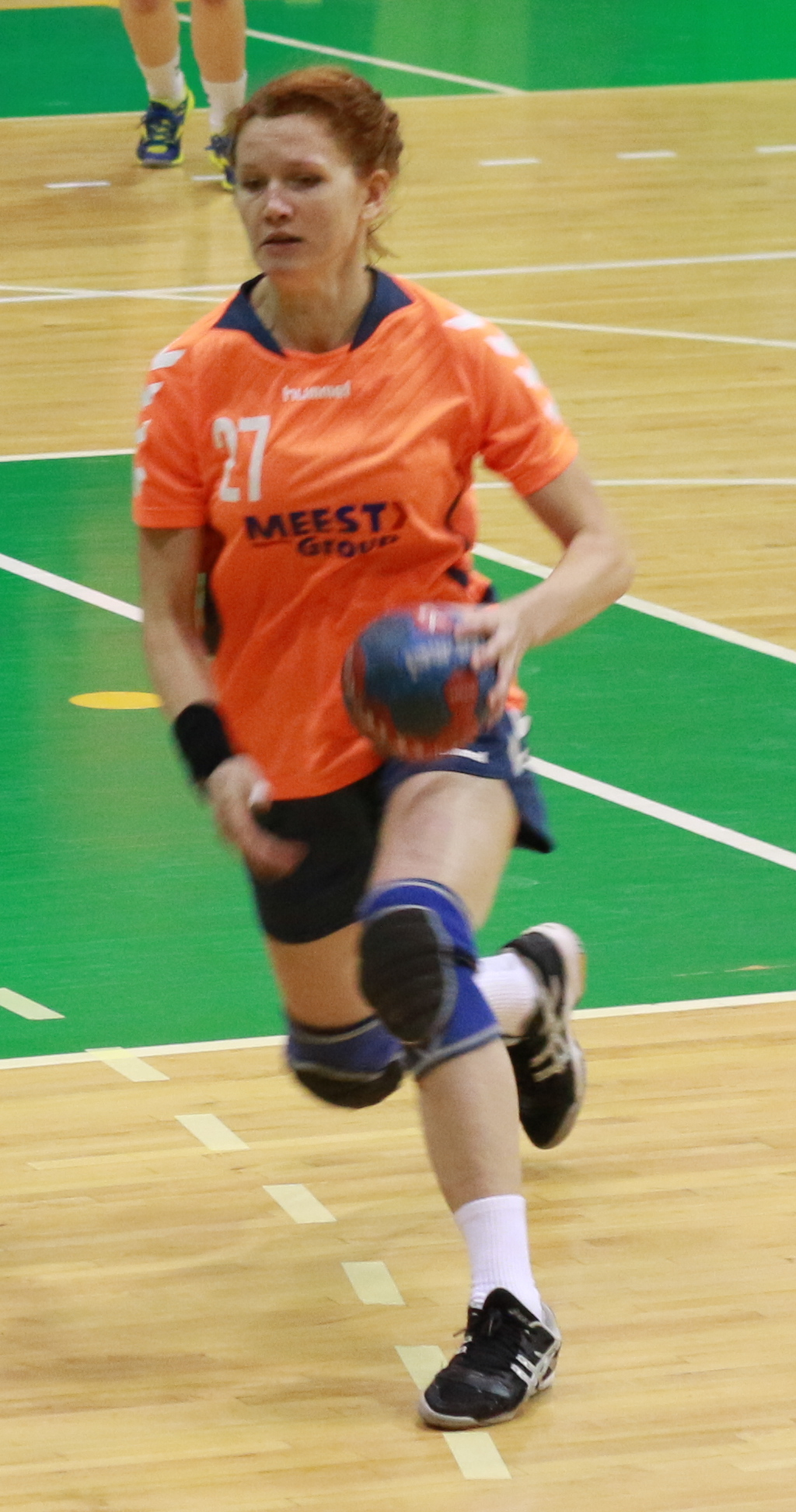

Personal information
- Nationality: Ukrainian
- Born: 25 June 1982 (age 44) Ternivka, Ukrainian SSR
- Height: 1.75 m (5 ft 9 in)

Sport
- Sport: Handball
- Position: Central back
- Current club: Karpaty Uzhgorod
- Number: 14
National team
Years	Team	Apps	(Gls)
–	Ukraine	15	(17)
- Updated on 4 December 2012

Natalya Turkalo (née Maydabura; born 25 June 1982) is a Ukrainian handball player for SPR JKS Jarosław and the former player for Ukrainian national team.
