= Iryna Stelmakh =

Ukrainian handball player (born 1993)

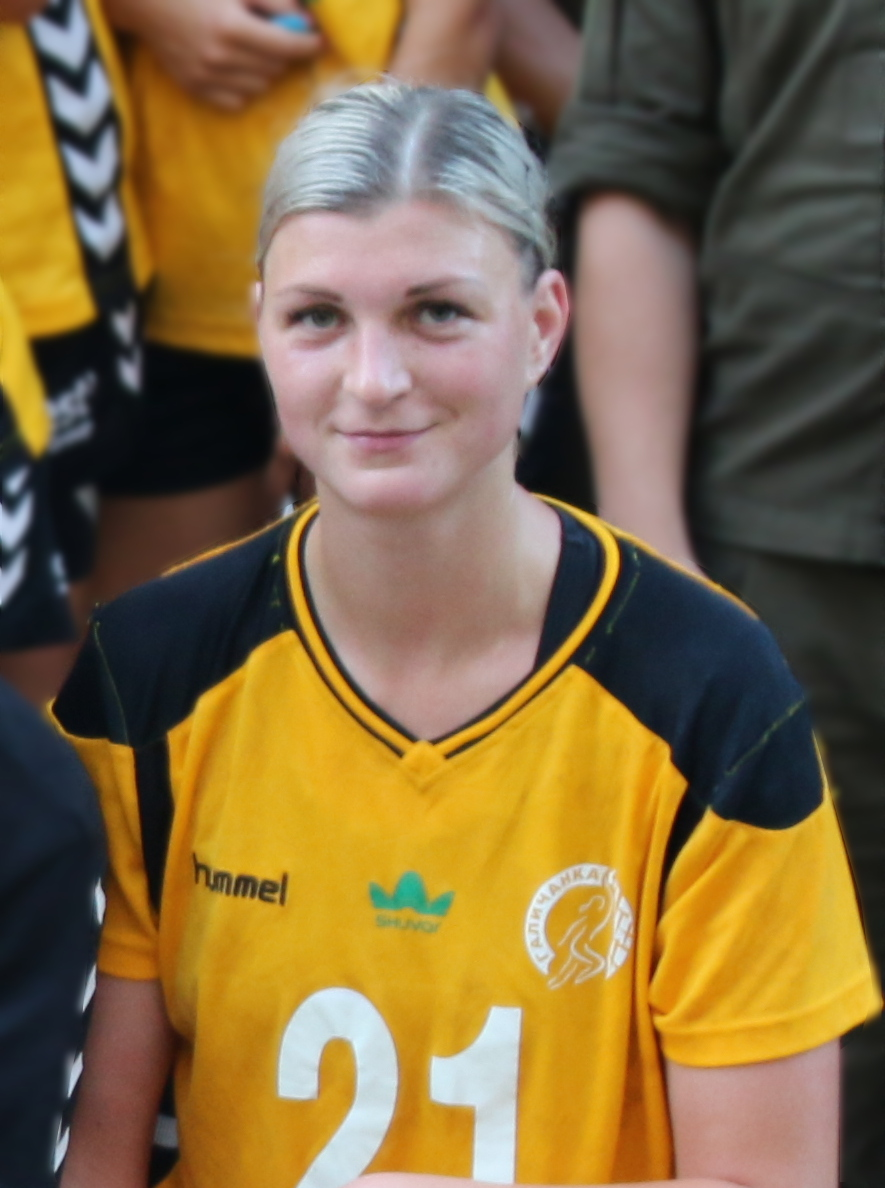

Personal information
- Nationality: Ukrainian
- Born: 18 August 1993 (age 33) Kozova, Ternopil Oblast, Ukraine
- Height: 1.92 m (6 ft 4 in)

Sport
- Sport: Handball
- Position: Left back
- Number: 27

Senior clubs
- Years: Team
- 2009-2016: HC Galychanka
- 2015-2017: Olimpia-Beskid Nowy Sącz
- 2018-2019: HC Galychanka
- 2019-2020: HK Homel
- 2021-2023: HC Astrakhanochka
- 2021-2023: RK Podravka Koprivnica
National team
Years	Team	Apps	(Gls)
–	Ukraine	36	(?)

Iryna Stelmakh (born 18 August 1993) is a Ukrainian former handball player for RK Podravka Koprivnica and the Ukrainian national team.

She retired in july 2023.
