= Tamara Smbatian =

Ukrainian handball player

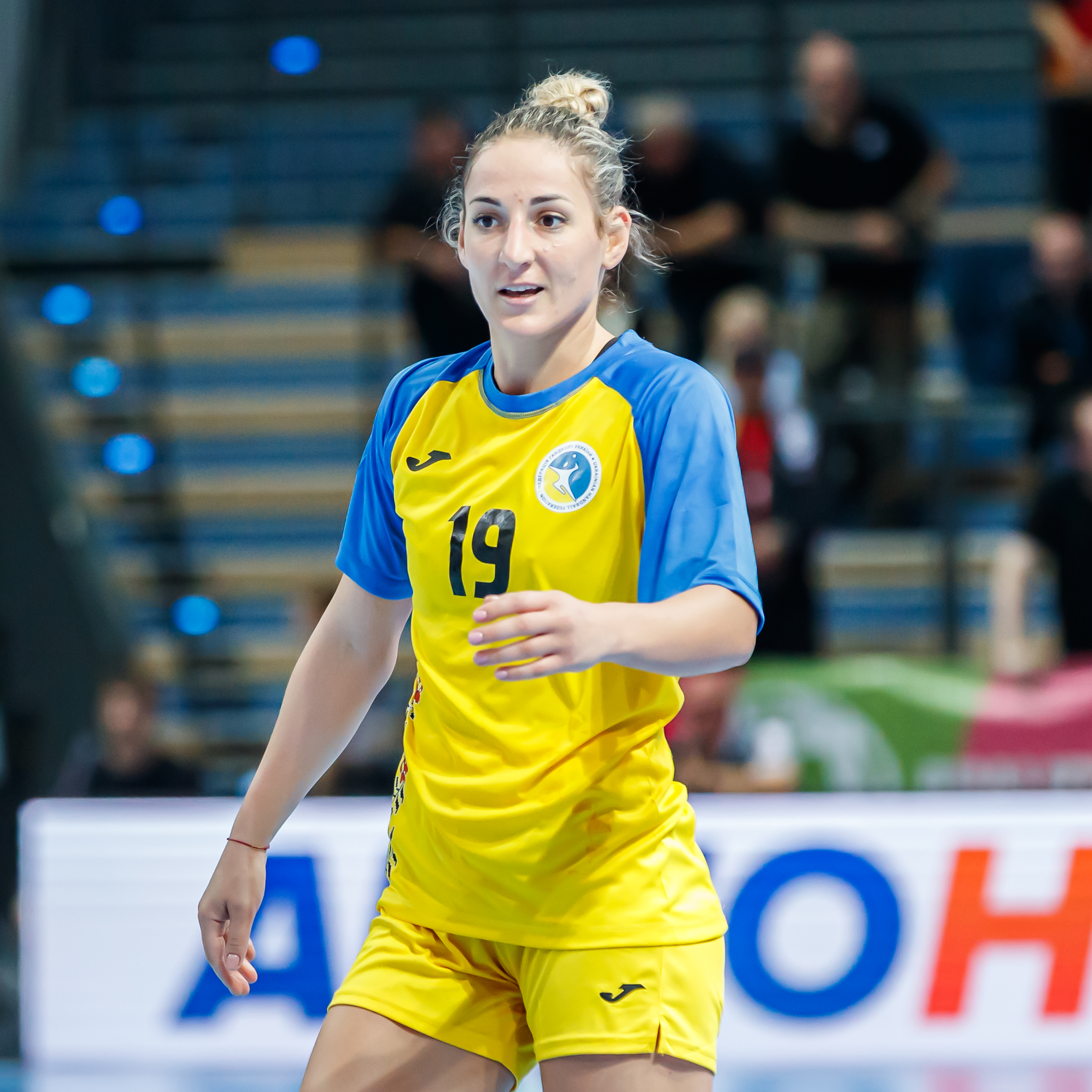

Personal information
- Nationality: Ukrainian
- Born: 19 March 1995 (age 31) Ivano-Frankivsk, Ukraine
- Height: 1.77 m (5 ft 10 in)

Sport
- Sport: Handball
- Position: Centre back

Senior clubs
- Years: Team
- 2010–2015: Galytchanka Lviv
- 2015-2017: Olimpia-Beskid Nowy Sącz
- 2017–2019: Energa AZS Koszalin
- 2019–2020: Măgura Cisnădie
- 2020–2021: Corona Brașov
- 2021–: Alba Fehérvár KC
National team
| Years | Team | Apps | (Gls) |
| – | Ukraine | 32 | (76) |
- Updated on 20 November 2024

Tamara Smbatian (born 19 March 1995) is a Ukrainian handball player who plays for the Ukrainian national team.

== Achievements ==
- Ukrainian Super League:
  - Winner: 2015
- Ekstraklasa:
  - Bronze Medalist: 2018, 2019
- EHF Challenge Cup:
  - Semifinalist: 2015

== Individual awards ==
- Ukrainian Super League MVP: 2014
- European Universities Championships MVP: 2013
- Alba Fehérvár KC Player of the year season 2022/2023
- Alba Fehérvár KC Player of the year season 2023/2024
