= Nataliia Volovnyk =

Ukrainian handball player

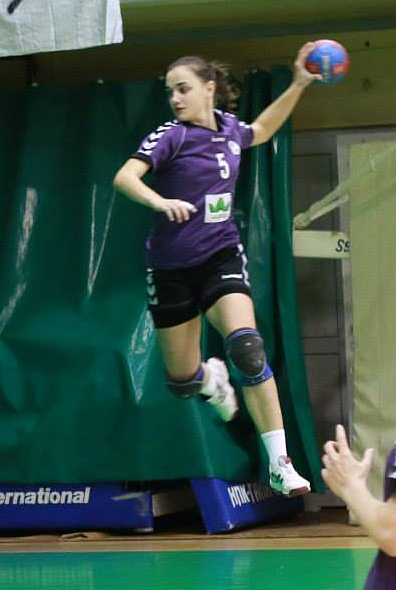

Personal information
- Full name: Nataliia Petrivna Volovnyk
- Nationality: Ukrainian
- Born: 13 March 1993 (age 33) Kozova, Ternopil Oblast, Ukraine
- Height: 1.70 m (5 ft 7 in)

Sport
- Sport: Handball
- Position: Right wing
- Current club: DHB Rotweiss Thun
- Number: 17

Senior clubs
- Years: Team
- 2009–2018: SC Galytchanka Lviv
- 2018–2021: AZS Politechnika Koszalin
- 2021–2025: JKS Jarosław
- 2025–: DHB Rotweiss Thun
National team
Years	Team	Apps	(Gls)
–	Ukraine	0	(?)

Nataliia Petrivna Volovnyk ({Ukrainian: Наталія Петрівна Воловник, born 13 March 1993) is a Ukrainian handball player for Swiss team DHB Rotweiss Thun and the Ukrainian national team. In 2009–2018 played for SC Galytchanka Lviv, in 2018–2021 played for AZS Politechnika Koszalin and 2021-2025 for JKS Jarosław.

In addition to regular handball, Volovnyk also plays beach handball.
