= Handball Federation of Ukraine =

Governing body of handball in Ukraine

Handball Federation of Ukraine Ukrainian: Федерації гандболу України HFU
- IOC nation: Ukraine (UKR)
- Sport: Handball
- Other sports: Beach handball
- Official website: www.handball.net.ua

HISTORY
- Year of formation: 1992; 34 years ago

AFFILIATIONS
- International federation: International Handball Federation (IHF)
- IHF member since: 1992
- Continental association: European Handball Federation
- National Olympic Committee: National Olympic Committee of Ukraine

GOVERNING BODY
- President: Andriy Melnik

HEADQUARTERS
- Address: St. Sichovyh Striltsiv 10, 04053 Kyiv
- Country: Ukraine
- Secretary General: Oleksandr Gladun

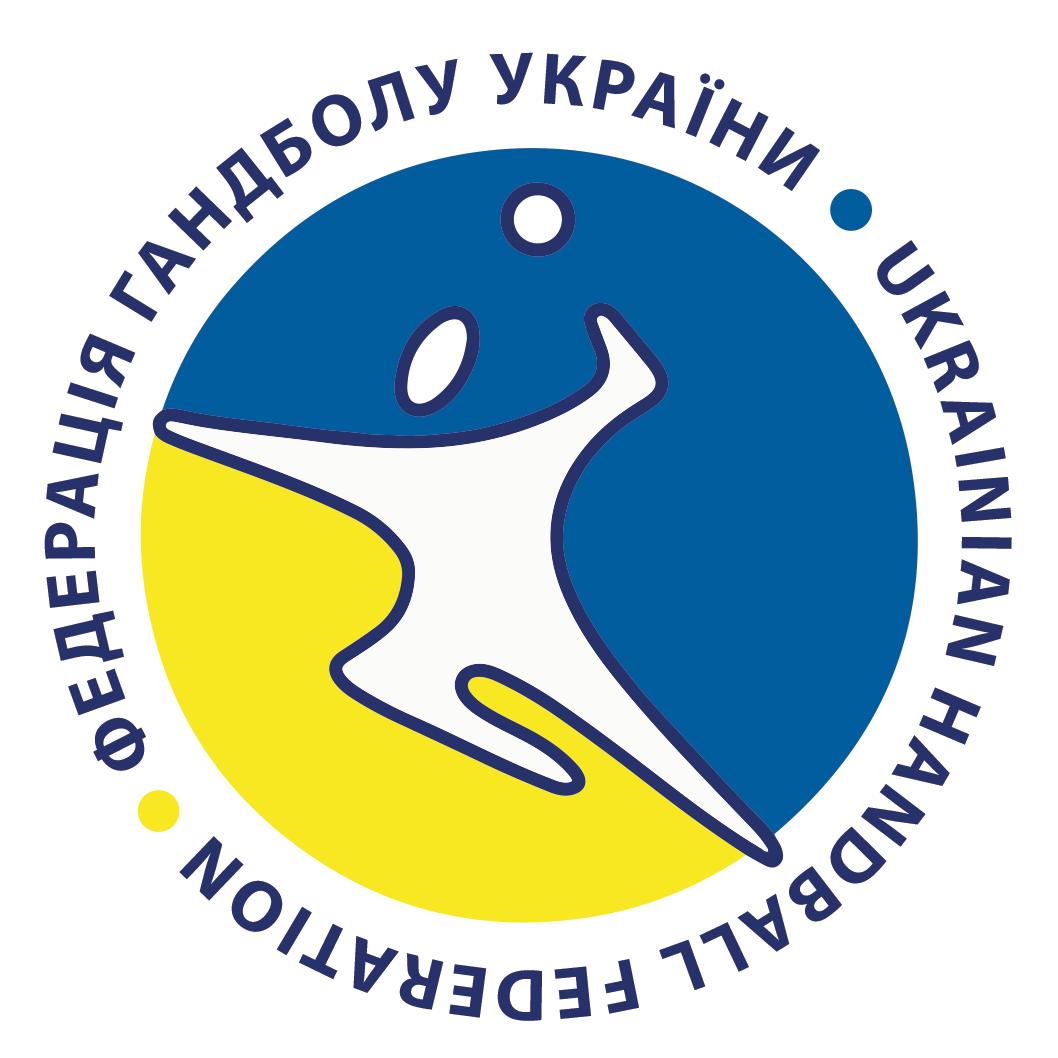
Ukrainian Handball Federation logo

The Handball Federation of Ukraine (Ukrainian: Федерації гандболу України) (HFU) is the administrative and controlling body for handball and beach handball in Ukraine. Founded in 1992, HFU is a member of European Handball Federation (EHF) and the International Handball Federation (IHF).

== National teams ==
- Ukraine men's national handball team
- Ukraine men's national junior handball team
- Ukraine women's national handball team

== Competitions ==
- Ukrainian Men's Handball Super League
- Ukrainian Women's Handball Super League
