= GF World Cup '06 =

International women's handball competition

Official logo

The GF World Cup '06 was an eight-team tournament in women's handball, held in Atletion, Århus, Denmark between 14 November and 19 November 2006. It was the second installment of the Handball World Cup, and the tournament was organised by the Danish Handball Association. It was an invitational tournament with no affiliation to the International Handball Federation, but five of the top eight women's teams in the world competed at this event, including permanent representatives Sweden and Denmark. Defending champions Norway did not take part. The tournament is said to be the world's most prestigious non-IHF handball tournament for women, and most matches in the tournament were broadcast live on Eurosport. Defending world champions Russia won the tournament, after a last-minute victory over Romania in the final, a replay of the 2005 World Championship final.

== Results ==
In both groups, the semi-finalists were determined before the final round of games.

=== Group A ===
Team	Pld	W	L	PF	PA	PD	Pts
Romania	3	3	0	86	77	+9	6
Denmark	3	2	1	85	72	+13	4
Sweden	3	1	2	71	84	−13	2
Poland	3	0	3	76	85	−9	0

14 November 2006

Romania	33–27	Poland
Denmark	33–27	Sweden

15 November 2006

Romania	28–20	Sweden
Denmark	28–26	Poland

16 November 2006

Poland	23–24	Sweden
Denmark	24–25	Romania

=== Group B ===
Team	Pld	W	L	PF	PA	PD	Pts
Russia	3	3	0	112	93	+19	6
Ukraine	3	2	1	91	88	+3	4
Netherlands	3	1	2	87	91	−4	2
Brazil	3	0	3	90	108	−18	0

14 November 2006

Ukraine	25–24	Netherlands
Russia	38–34	Brazil

15 November 2006

Russia	41–32	Netherlands
Ukraine	39–31	Brazil

16 November 2006

Russia	33–27	Ukraine
Netherlands	31–25	Brazil

=== Knockouts ===
==== Semi finals ====
18 November 2006

Romania	27–25	Ukraine
Russia	32–28	Denmark

==== 3rd/4th place ====
19 November 2006

Ukraine	20–24	Denmark

==== Final ====
19 November 2006

Romania	28–29	Russia
