= Natalya Semenchenko =

Ukrainian journalist (born 1976)

Natalya Semenchenko Ната́лия Семе́нченко
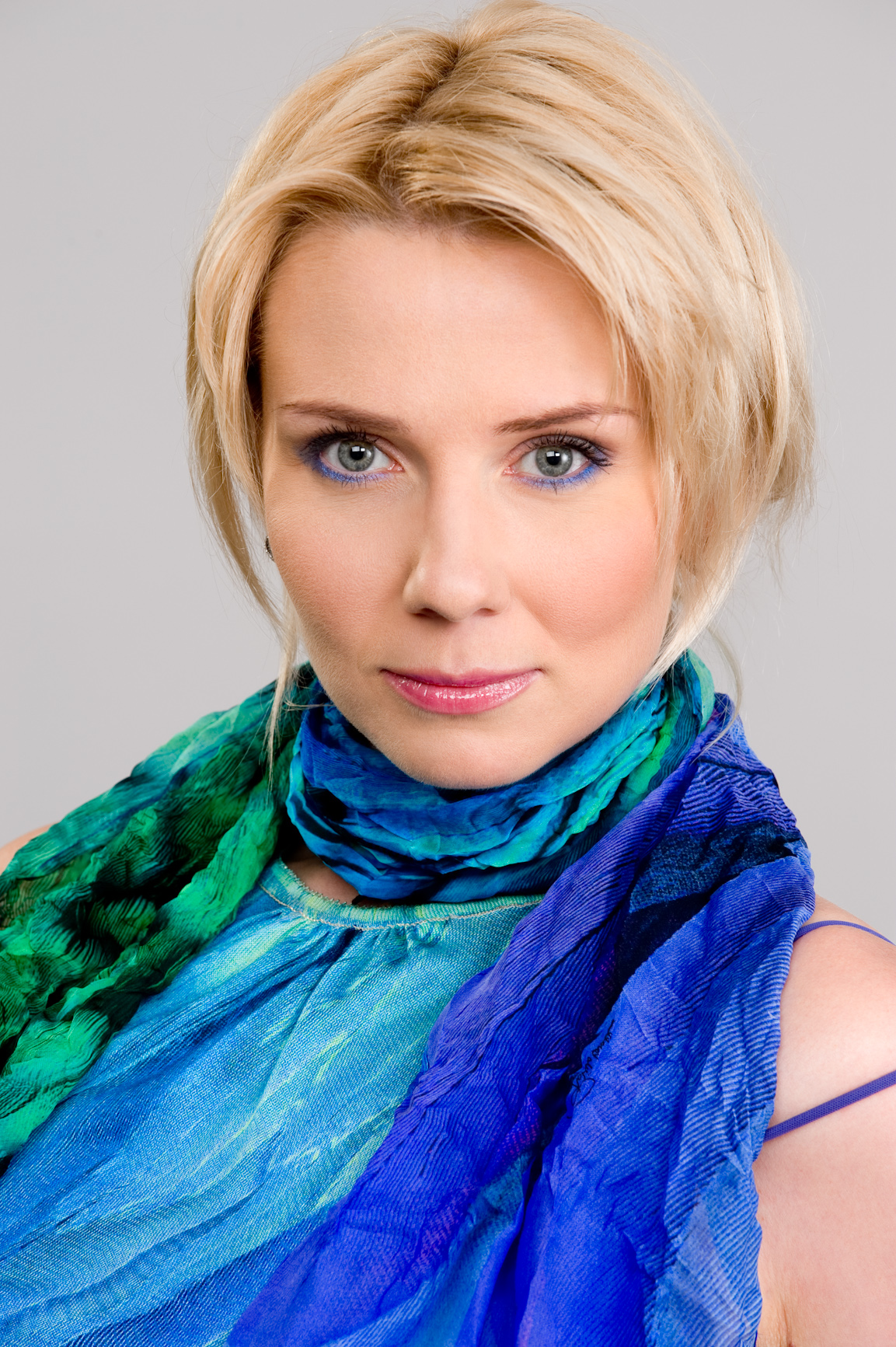
- Natalya Semenchenko
- Born: January 24, 1976 (age 50); Kiev, Ukrainian SSR, Soviet Union (now Kyiv, Ukraine)
- Website: http://www.semenchenko.ua

Natalya Semenchenko (Russian: Ната́лия Семе́нченко, Ukrainian: Ната́лія Семе́нченко – born 24 January 1976 in Kyiv) is a DPhil in Economics, professor, writer and publicist, Head of the Center of scientific thought "Dosvіd".

== Biography ==
She was born on January 24, 1976, in Kyiv, at the time in the Ukrainian SSR of the Soviet Union. In 1998, she graduated from the publishing and printing department of the National Technical University of Ukraine (KPI) specialty "Management of non-manufacturing sector". In 1999 she enrolled in graduate studies at the Department of Management and Marketing NTUU "KPI".

In the period from 2000 to 2005, actively participates in European conferences. In 2005, defended her Ph.D. dissertation on the topic: "The strategy of formation reliability sales structure". On the basis of this work first introduces Natalya and justifies the notion of "reliability" in the economy (before that was used only in the technical direction). The same year Natalya began working with the Ukrainian Academy of Sciences, where she performs an economic justification for a series of projects of the academy. Later, she has actively published in scientific journals and has published a monograph. In 2006 Natalya received the title of Corresponding Member of Ukrainian Academy of Sciences.

Period 2008-2010 marked by passion in journalism. Natalya has released three her books: The Hunt for the Truth (Russian: "Охота на правду"), Education in Ukraine (Russian: "Образование в Украине"), Education and Intellect (Russian: "Образование и интеллект"), which generally convey the current state of Ukraine and Ukrainian citizens perception of global change in the world and native country. November 10, 2010, Natalya spent online conference on "Economic perspectives of Ukraine through the prism of the local elections", where users during three days could ask any questions about her views on the further development of Ukraine.

In general, on the beginning of 2012 the number of Natalya's publications exceeds 100 works, among which the majority of scientific and socio-economic articles, 5 monographs and three books.

19 December 2011, Natalya defended her doctoral Dissertation on the subject: "The genesis of enterprise restructuring in conditions of globalization" (Order of the Ministry of education and science, youth and sports of Ukraine of 17.02.2012 No.187).

In 2011, Semenchenko has released her program Dosvіd (Ukrainian: ”Досвід") at the Pershyi Natsionalnyi channel of Ukrainian television. Program comes once a week. The main idea of the program - to understand the essence ongoing reforms in the Ukrainian state. Semenchenko is not only leading of the program, but also author of the program. Natalya independently develops scenarios for the program. Guests of the program are leading scientists, politicians and experts. For the nine months of rotation on television in the program were able to attend many Ukrainian politicians and statesmen, such as Oleksandr Lavrynovych (Minister of Justice of Ukraine), Mykola Prysyazhnyuk (Minister of Agrarian Policy and food of Ukraine), Sergei Tigipko (Ukrainian financial and political figure, Vice Prime Minister — Minister of Social Policy), Volodymyr Lytvyn (Ukrainian politician, Speaker of the Verkhovna Rada of Ukraine in 2002–2006 years and from 9 December 2008 and to this day. Hero of Ukraine), Dmytro Tabachnyk (Minister of education, youth and sport of Ukraine), Petro Poroshenko (Ex-Minister of Foreign Affairs of Ukraine, Head of the supervisory board of the National Bank of Ukraine), Viktor Yushchenko (Ukrainian state and political figure, the third President of Ukraine), Leonid Kravchuk (1st President of Ukraine, Chairman of the Scientific Expert Group on the preparation of the Constituent Assembly), Oleksandr Moroz (3rd and 7th Chairman of Verkhovna Rada of Ukraine), Anatoliy Kinakh (Head of the Ukrainian Union of Industrialists and Entrepreneurs, National Deputy of Ukraine), Ilya Yemets (cardiac surgeon, Doctor of Medical Sciences, Honored Doctor of Ukraine, ex-Health Minister of Ukraine), Natalia Narochnitskaya (prominent Russian nationalist politician, historian and diplomat), Anatoly Prysyazhnyuk (Governor of Kyiv region), Valentina Matviyenko (4th Chairman of the Federation CouncilIncumbent), Anatoly Kucherena (Chairman of the Public Chamber of Russian control the activities of law enforcement agencies, security agencies and judicial reform), Anatoly Bliznyuk (Ukrainian politician, Minister of Regional Development, construction, housing and communal services of Ukraine in the government of Mykola Azarov) and others.

In December 2014 Natalia published a trilogy in the series "Hunt for the Truth": "Independence", "Revolution", "Corruption" In her books Semenchenko investigates the domestic political and economic situation in Ukraine in connection with developments in the globalized world. In the spring of 2015 Natalia Semenchenko became the head CST "Dosvid", which is engaged in research and innovation.

From 4 December 2015 till June 10, 2016 talk show "Dosvіd with Nataliia Semenchenko" (Ukrainian: ”Досвід з Наталією Семенченко") takes place every Friday on "5 Kanal", in the live broadcast of which are discussed the most important topics of economic, political and social development of Ukraine.

In the fall of 2017, Natalia, with the active group of the student community, establishes an Open Student Association, at which the intellectual club of the OSA begins to work. Twice a month, the club holds public meetings with video interviews with experts, representatives of science and business, active intellectuals and just successful individuals. Questions concerning society, the state, economy, science and technology are discussed there.

Several times Semenchenko appeared in popular print media in Ukraine: the magazine Vlast deneg (May 2007, No. 131), the magazine Status (No. 48/166), the magazine Svobodnaya tribuna (No. 5 / 92 2011), the magazine Publichnye lyudi (No. May 5, 2011), the newspaper 2000, the newspaper Facty, the newspaper Top 10, the newspaper Gazeta po-Kievski, the newspaper Ukraina moloda, the newspaper Business Ukraine.

She speaks Russian, Ukrainian and English languages and also Hungarian and Italian (with dictionary).

== Books ==
- The Hunt for the truth (Russian: "Охота на правду"; Kyiv: Summit Books, 2009), circulation 3000 copies., ISBN 978-966-7889-43-2;
- Education in Ukraine (Russian: "Образование в Украине"; Kyiv: Summit Books, 2010), circulation 2000 copies., ISBN 978-966-7889-60-9;
- Education and intellect (Russian: "Образование в Украине"; Kyiv: Summit Books, 2010), circulation 1000 copies., ISBN 978-966-7889-66-1.
- The Hunt for the truth. Independence (Russian: "Охота на правду. Независимость"; Kyiv: Summit Books, 2015), circulation 1000 copies., ISBN 978-617-7182-33-6.
- The Hunt for the truth. Revolution (Russian: "Охота на правду. Революция"; Kyiv: Summit Books, 2015), circulation 1000 copies., ISBN 978-617-7182-34-3.
- The Hunt for the truth. Corruption (Russian: "Охота на правду. Коррупция"; Kyiv: Summit Books, 2015), circulation 1000 copies., ISBN 978-617-7182-35-0.

== Awards ==
- In the 2009 book «The Hunt for the truth» (Russian: "Охота на правду") has been recognized by experts of XI Ukrainian rating "Book of the Year" as one of the best book in the category "Scientific and popular literature, journalism".
