= CSKA Kyiv (handball) =

Ukrainian handball club

- Founded: 1946; 79 years ago
- Arena: Palace of Sports, Kyiv
- Capacity: 7,000
- League: Ukrainian Men's Handball Super League
- 2020–21: 6th

CSKA Kyiv is a team handball club from Kyiv, Ukraine. The club was once very strong in the Soviet championships and early championships of Ukraine.

== History ==
The club began its participation in the Soviet Men's Handball Championship in 1966, where they finished fourth. In 1969, the club was relegated from the top league. They returned to the league in 1973. In the 1980 USSR cup, the club finished third. In 1992 they won the first Ukrainian championship.

== Accomplishments ==
- Ukrainian SSR championship: 3
  - Champion: (5): 1966, 1968, 1979, 1980, 1981
  - Runner-up (13): 1971, 1974, 1975, 1976, 1982, 1983, 1984, 1985, 1986, 1987, 1988, 1989A, 1989B
  - Bronze: (4): 1967, 1969, 1970, 1973
- Ukrainian championship: 2
  - Champion (2): 1992, 1994
  - Runner-up (1): 1995
  - Bronze (1): 1993

== Sources ==
- Honcharuk, Oleksii; Benedys, Andrii (2009), Степени ганлбола 1966-2009 [Degrees of handball 1966-2009] (in Russian), Chernivtsi: Prut
