= Ukrainian Men's Handball Super League =

- Current season, competition or edition: 2026–27 Ukrainian Men's Handball Super League
- Sport: Handball
- Founded: 1992
- Organising body: Ukrainian Handball Federation
- No. of teams: 8
- Country: Ukraine
- Confederation: EHF
- Most recent champions: HC Motor Zaporizhzhia, (14th title) (2025-26)
- Most titles: HC ZTR Zaporizhzhia; HC Motor Zaporizhzhia (14 titles)
- International cups: EHF European League; EHF European Cup
- Website: handball.net.ua

The Ukrainian Men's Handball Super League (Ukrainian: Гандбольна Суперліга) is the top men's league of Ukrainian handball. It was founded in 1992. It is run by the Handball Federation of Ukraine (FHU).

== History ==
Before, the Ukrainian teams played in the championship of the USSR. During the seasons from 1991–92 till 1999–2000, it was called the Premier League (Ukrainian: Гандбольна вища ліга). During the seasons from 2000–01 till 2003–04, it was called the Premier League A (Ukrainian: Гандбольна вища ліга А).

Between leagues at the end of each season, the teams exchanged – the worst drop in the lower-ranking division, their places are taken by the best team of the lower leagues. The best teams of the Super League to play in European Cup tournaments held under the auspices of the European Handball Federation (EHF).

== Teams ==
The following 8 clubs have competed in the Super League.

Team	City	Arena
Motor Zaporizhzhia	Zaporizhzhia	Yunost Sport Hall
HC ZTR Zaporizhzhia	Zaporizhzhia	Palace of Sports "ZTR"
ZNTU-ZAB Zaporizhzhia	Zaporizhzhia	Palace of Sports "ZAB"
CSKA Kyiv	Kyiv	
Shakhtar-Academiya	Donetsk	
NAEC Netishyn	Netishyn	
ZTR Burevisnyk	Zaporizhzhia	Palace of Sports "ZTR"
Lviv Polytechnic	Lviv	

== Super League past champions ==
- 1992 : SKA Kyiv
- 1993 : HC ZTR Zaporizhzhia
- 1994 : CSKA-ZSU Kyiv (2)
- 1995 : ZTR Zaporizhzhia (2)
- 1996 : Shakhtar-Academiya
- 1997 : Shakhtar-Academiya (2)
- 1998 : HC ZTR Zaporizhzhia (3)
- 1999 : HC ZTR Zaporizhzhia (4)
- 2000 : HC ZTR Zaporizhzhia (5)
- 2001 : HC ZTR Zaporizhzhia (6)
- 2002 : Shakhtar-Academiya (3)
- 2003 : HC ZTR Zaporizhzhia (7)
- 2004 : HC ZTR Zaporizhzhia (8)
- 2005 : HC ZTR Zaporizhzhia (9)
- 2006 : Portovyk Yuzhne
- 2007 : HC ZTR Zaporizhzhia (10)
- 2008 : HC ZTR Zaporizhzhia (11)
- 2009 : HC ZTR Zaporizhzhia (12)
- 2010 : HC ZTR Zaporizhzhia (13)
- 2011 : HC ZTR Zaporizhzhia (14)
- 2012 : Dynamo Poltava
- 2013 : HC Motor Zaporizhzhia
- 2014 : HC Motor Zaporizhzhia (2)
- 2015 : HC Motor Zaporizhzhia (3)
- 2016 : HC Motor Zaporizhzhia (4)
- 2017 : HC Motor Zaporizhzhia (5)
- 2018 : HC Motor Zaporizhzhia (6)
- 2019 : HC Motor Zaporizhzhia (7)
- 2020 : HC Motor Zaporizhzhia (8)
- 2021 : HC Motor Zaporizhzhia (9)
- 2022 : HC Motor Zaporizhzhia (10)
- 2023 : HC Motor Zaporizhzhia (11)
- 2024 : HC Motor Zaporizhzhia (12)
- 2025 : HC Motor Zaporizhzhia (13)
- 2026 : HC Motor Zaporizhzhia (14)

	Club	Titles	Year
1.	HC ZTR Zaporizhzhia	14	1993, 1995, 1998, 1999, 2000, 2001, 2003, 2004, 2005, 2007, 2008, 2009, 2010, 2011
1.	HC Motor Zaporizhzhia	14	2013, 2014, 2015, 2016, 2017, 2018, 2019, 2020, 2021, 2022, 2023, 2024, 2025, 2026
3.	Shakhtar-Academiya	3	1996, 1997, 2002
4.	CSKA Kyiv	2	1992, 1994
5.	Portovyk Yuzhne	1	2006
5.	Dynamo Poltava	1	2012

== See also ==
- Ukrainian Women's Handball Super League
- CSK ZSU Kyiv
