= HC Donbas Donetsk Oblast =

Ukrainian handball club

- Full name: Handbolnyj Klub Donbas / Handball Club Donbas Donetsk Oblast
- Short name: Donbas
- Founded: 1983; 43 years ago, as Shakhtar-Academiia
- League: Ukrainian Men's Handball Super League
- 2021-22: 2nd
- Club colours

Handball Club Donbas Donetsk Oblast (Ukrainian: ГК Донбас) (previous name Shakhtar-Academiia until June 2017) is a handball club from Donetsk. The club was formed in 1983 on the base of a previous handball club called Spartak Donetsk.

== History ==
In 1985 they were promoted to the Soviet Union Handball League.

Through the 90's the club one of the leading forces in the Ukrainian Men's Handball Super League, winning the local league 3 times, and between seasons 1994–95–2005–06 the club never finished outside the top 3. The club also had success on the international arena, reaching the final of the EHF Cup in 1995–96, losing to Spanish BM Granollers in the final 56–45 on aggregate.

After season 2005–06, the club started experiencing financial difficulties, and in season 2011–12 the club finished last in the league and was relegated. In the second league, in season 2012–13, the club managed to finish first and returned to the top tier. In 2017 they changed the name of the club to HK Donbas.

After the Russian invasion of Ukraine in 2022 several players fled the region, where the team is based.

== Honours ==
=== Domestic ===
- (Ukraine) Ukrainian Handball Super League
  - Winners (3): 1996, 1997, 2002
  - Runner-Up (1): 2004

=== International ===
- (European Union) EHF Cup
  - Runner-Up (1): 1995–96
