= HC Motor Zaporizhzhia =

Ukrainian handball club

- Full name: Handball Club Motor Zaporizhzhia
- Founded: 1958; 68 years ago
- Arena: Yunist Palace of Sports
- Capacity: 3,600
- Head coach: Gintaras Savukynas
- League: Ukrainian Men's Handball Super League
- 2024–25: 1st
- Club colours
Home	Away

HC Motor Zaporizhzhia is a Ukrainian professional men's handball club. It competes in the Ukrainian Men's Handball Super League.

Founded in 1958, the club won their first championship in 2013, when they won the double. In 2014 they won the Championship again without losing a single point.

Due to the Russian Invasion of Ukraine, the team fled to Germany and played a season in the German 2nd Bundesliga.

== Titles ==
- Ukrainian Championship:
  - Winner: 2013, 2014, 2015, 2016, 2017, 2018, 2019, 2020, 2021, 2022, 2023, 2024, 2025
  - Second place: 2012
- Ukrainian Cup:
  - Winner: 2013, 2015, 2016, 2017, 2018, 2019, 2020, 2021, 2023, 2024
  - Second-place: 2011, 2014
- Ukrainian Super Cup:
  - Winner: 2015, 2016, 2017, 2018, 2021, 2023
- Soviet Championship
  - Second-place: 1963, 1964
  - Third-place: 1965, 1968

== Notable players ==
- (Belarus) Barys Pukhouski : 2015-2022
- (Belarus) Aliaksandr Tsitou : 2013-2014
- (Belarus) Maxim Babichev : 2017-2021
- (Belarus) Viachaslau Bokhan : 2020-2022
- (Ukraine) Sergiy Onufriyenko : 2013-2015
- (Russia) / (Ukraine) Sergey Shelmenko : 2015-2019
- (Russia) Gleb Kalarash : 2015-2017
- (Russia) Viktor Kireyev : 2016-2020
- (Lithuania) Aidenas Malašinskas : 2015-2022
- (Slovakia) Richard Štochl : 2013-2015
- (Poland) Mateusz Kus : 2018-2020
- (Estonia) Dener Jaanimaa : 2019-2020
