= Ukrainian Women's Handball Super League =

- Current season, competition or edition: 2026-27
- Sport: Handball
- Founded: 1992
- First season: 1992
- CEO: (Ukraine) Andriy Melnyk
- Organising body: Ukrainian Handball Federation
- No. of teams: 6 (2024–25)
- Country: Ukraine
- Continent: Europe
- Most recent champion: Halychanka Lviv (12th title) (2025-26)
- Most titles: Motor Zaporizhzhia (14 titles)
- Website: www.handball.net.ua/

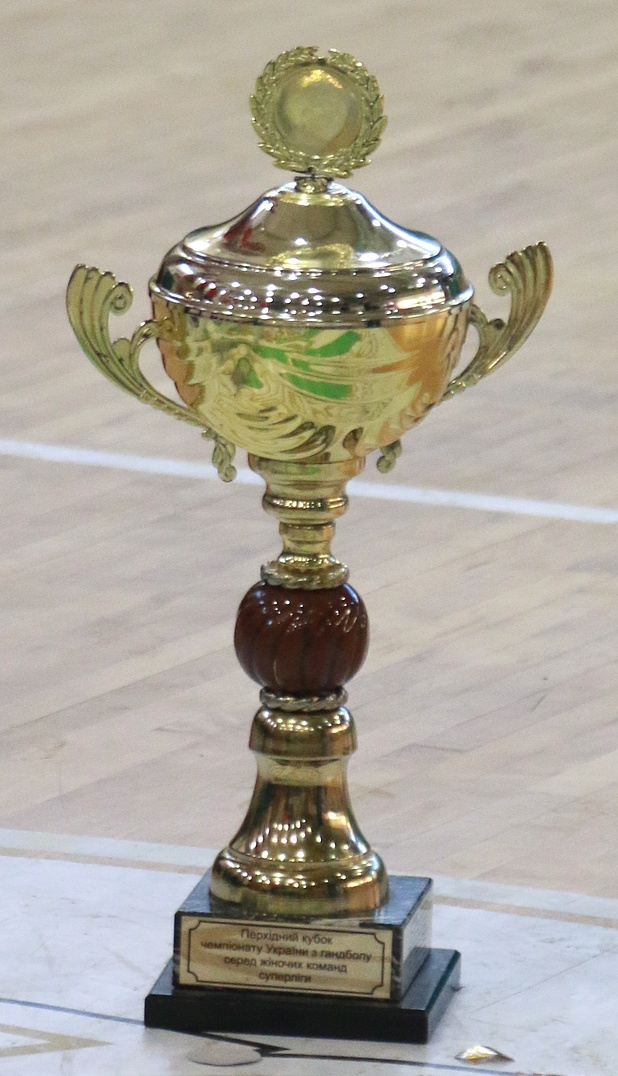
Ukrainian Women's Handball Super League Сup

The Ukrainian Women's Handball Super League (Ukrainian: Гандбольна Суперліга) is the top women's league of Ukrainian handball.

== History ==
The league was founded in 1992. It is run by the Handball Federation of Ukraine (FHU). Before, the Ukrainian teams played in the championship of the USSR. During the seasons from 1991–92 till 1999–2000 it was called the Supreme League (Ukrainian: Гандбольна Вища ліга). During the seasons from 2000–01 till 2003–04 it was called the Supreme League A (Ukrainian: Гандбольна Вища ліга «А»). It is named Super League (Ukrainian: Суперліга) since the 2004–05 season.

Between leagues at the end of each season, the teams exchanged – the worst drop in the lower-ranking division, their places are taken by the best team of the lower leagues. The best teams of the Super League play in European Cup tournaments held under the auspices of the European Handball Federation (EHF).

== Winners ==
Year	Golds	Silver	Bronze
1992	Spartak Kyiv (1)	Motor Zaporizhzhia	Avtomobilist Brovary
1992–93	Motor Zaporizhzhia (1)	Avtomobilist Brovary	Spartak Kyiv
1993–94	Motor Zaporizhzhia (2)	Spartak Kyiv	Avtomobilist Brovary
1994–95	Motor Zaporizhzhia (3)	Spartak Kyiv	Avtomobilist Brovary
1995–96	Spartak Kyiv (2)	Motor Zaporizhzhia	Avtomobilist Brovary
1996–97	Motor Zaporizhzhia (4)	Avtomobilist Brovary	Karpaty Uzhhorod
1997–98	Motor Zaporizhzhia (5)	Spartak Kyiv	Halychanka Lviv
1998–99	Motor Zaporizhzhia (6)	Spartak Kyiv	Avtomobilist Brovary
1999–00	Spartak Kyiv (3)	Motor Zaporizhzhia	Halychanka Lviv
2000–01	Motor Zaporizhzhia (7)	Spartak Kyiv	Transportnyk Brovary
2001–02	Motor Zaporizhzhia (8)	Spartak Kyiv	Halychanka Lviv
2002–03	Motor Zaporizhzhia (9)	Spartak Kyiv	Halychanka Lviv
2003–04	Motor Zaporizhzhia (10)	Spartak Kyiv	Halychanka Lviv
2004–05	Motor Zaporizhzhia (11)	Halychanka Lviv	Spartak Kyiv
2005–06	Motor Zaporizhzhia (12)	Spartak Kyiv	Halychanka Lviv
2006–07	Motor Zaporizhzhia (13)	Halychanka Lviv	Podatkova Akademiya Irpin
2007–08	Motor Zaporizhzhia (14)	Halychanka Lviv	Karpaty Uzhhorod
2008–09	SMART Kryvyi Rih (1)	Motor Zaporizhzhia	Halychanka Lviv
2009–10	SMART Kryvyi Rih (2)	Zaporizhzhia-ZDIA Zaporizhzhia	Podatkova Akademiya Irpin
2010–11	Sparta Kryvyi Rih (3)	Karpaty Uzhhorod	Podatkovyi Universytet Irpin
2011–12	Karpaty Uzhhorod (1)	Podatkovyi Universytet Irpin	Spartak Kyiv
2012–13	Karpaty Uzhhorod (2)	Halychanka Lviv	Dnipryanka Kherson
2013–14	Karpaty Uzhhorod (3)	Halychanka Lviv	Dnipryanka Kherson
2014–15	Halychanka Lviv (1)	Karpaty Uzhhorod	Dnipryanka Kherson
2015–16	Halychanka Lviv (2)	Karpaty Uzhhorod	Dnipryanka Kherson
2016–17	Halychanka Lviv (3)	Karpaty Uzhhorod	Dnipryanka Kherson
2017–18	Halychanka Lviv (4)	Karpaty Uzhhorod	Dnipryanka Kherson
2018–19	Halychanka Lviv (5)	Karpaty Uzhhorod	Dnipryanka Kherson
2019–20	Halychanka Lviv (6)	Real Mykolaiv	Karpaty Uzhhorod
2020–21	Halychanka Lviv (7)	Karpaty Uzhhorod	Real Mykolaiv
2021–22	Halychanka Lviv (8)	Dnipryanka Kherson	Real Mykolaiv
2022–23	Halychanka Lviv (9)	Karpaty Uzhhorod	Lviv Polytechnic-LPSC
2023–24	Halychanka Lviv (10)	Karpaty Uzhhorod	Spartak Kyiv
2024–25	Halychanka Lviv (11)	Karpaty Uzhhorod	Spartak Kyiv
2024–25	Halychanka Lviv (12)	Karpaty Uzhhorod	Spartak Kyiv

== Performance by club ==
Team	Winners	Runners-up	Third place
Motor/ZDIA Zaporizhzhia	14	5	0
Halychanka Lviv	12	5	7
Spartak Kyiv	3	9	5
Karpaty Uzhhorod	3	9	3
Sparta Kryvyi Rih	3	0	0
Avtomobilist Brovary	0	2	6
Dnipryanka Kherson	0	1	7
Podatkovyi Universytet Irpin	0	1	3
Real Mykolaiv	0	1	2
Total	31	31	31

== See also ==
- Ukrainian Men's Handball Super League
