= HC Karpaty Uzhhorod =

Ukrainian handball club

HC Karpaty
- Full name: HC Karpaty Uzhhorod
- Founded: 1969; 57 years ago
- Arena: Hall "Yunist"
- Capacity: 800
- League: Superleague
- 2025–26: 7th

HC Karpaty Uzhhorod is a women's handball club from Uzhhorod in Ukraine. HC Karpaty competes in the Ukrainian Superleague.

The club was founded in 1969 under the name Spartacus Beregovo, and in 1989 they moved to Uzhhorod. In 1996 they played in a European tournament for the first time, when they played in the EHF City Cup.

== Honours ==
- Superleague
  - Winners (3) : 2012, 2013, 2014
  - Second place (7): 2011, 2015, 2016, 2017, 2018, 2019, 2021
  - Third place (3): 1997, 2008, 2020
- Ukrainian Cup
  - Winners (1): 2018
  - Second place (4): 2016, 2019, 2023, 2024

== European record ==
Season	Competition	Round	Club	1st leg	2nd leg	Aggregate
2016-17	Challenge Cup	R3	(Switzerland) DHB Rotweiss Thun	34–25	20–17	54–42
2016-17	Challenge Cup	1/8	(Switzerland) LK Zug	25–29	25–36	50–65

== Team ==
=== Current squad ===
Squad for the 2016–17 season

Goalkeepers

- (Ukraine) Iryna Iablonska-Bobal
- (Ukraine) Kateryna Shelamova
- (Ukraine) Ielizaveta Voronko

Wingers
RW

- (Ukraine) Oleksandra Furmanets
- (Ukraine) Viktoriya Hychka
- (Ukraine) Nataliya Petrovska

LW

- (Ukraine) Yana Hotra
- (Ukraine) Tetiana Kylch

Line Players

- (Ukraine) Yevheniia Bilyk
- (Ukraine) Anastasiya Melekestseva
- (Ukraine) Anastasiya Popovych

Back players
LB

- (Ukraine) Irina Dronova
- (Ukraine) Anastasiya Petrovska

CB

- (Ukraine) Anna Lezinska
- (Ukraine) Nataliia Shypliak

RB

- (Ukraine) Iryna Kompaniiets
- (Ukraine) Kateryna Kupchak
- (Ukraine) Olha Sukhetska
