= Ukraine women's national handball team =

National team of Ukraine

Ukraine

Information
- Association: Handball Federation of Ukraine
- Coach: Borys Chyzhov
- Assistant coach: Olga Peredery
- Most caps: Maryna Vergelyuk (90)

Colours
1st	2nd

Results

Summer Olympics
- Appearances: 1 (First in 2004)
- Best result: (bronze) Bronze Medal (2004)

World Championship
- Appearances: 8 (First in 1995)
- Best result: 4th (2003)

European Championship
- Appearances: 12 (First in 1994)
- Best result: (silver) 2nd (2000)
- Last updated on Unknown.

Ukraine women's national handball team
Medal record

Olympic Games
Bronze medal – third place	2004 Athens	Team

European Championship
Silver medal – second place	2000 Romania	

The Ukraine women's national handball team is the national team of Ukraine. It is governed by the Ukrainian Handball Federation and takes part in international handball competitions.

== Results ==
=== Olympic Games ===
Year	Position	Pld	W	D	L	GS	GA	GD
(United States) 1996	Did not qualify							
(Australia) 2000	Did not qualify							
(Greece) 2004	3rd	7	6	0	1	165	152	+13
(China) 2008	Did not qualify							
(United Kingdom) 2012	Did not qualify							
(Brazil) 2016	Did not qualify							
(Japan) 2020	Did not qualify							
(France) 2024	Did not qualify							
Total	1/8	7	6	0	1	165	152	+13

=== World Championship ===
Year	Position	Pld	W	D	L	GS	GA	GD
(Austria) / (Hungary) 1995	9th	8	5	0	3	203	184	+19
(Germany) 1997	Did not qualify							
(Denmark) / (Norway) 1999	13th	6	3	0	3	157	139	+24
(Italy) 2001	18th	5	1	0	4	120	145	−25
(Croatia) 2003	4th	10	6	1	3	287	248	+39
(Russia) 2005	10th	8	3	2	3	242	216	+26
(France) 2007	13th	6	4	0	2	175	144	+31
(China) 2009	17th	8	4	0	4	284	235	+49
(Brazil) 2011	Did not qualify							
(Serbia) 2013	Did not qualify							
(Denmark) 2015	Did not qualify							
(Germany) 2017	Did not qualify							
(Japan) 2019	Did not qualify							
(Spain) 2021	Did not qualify							
(Denmark) / (Norway) / (Sweden) 2023	21st	6	1	0	5	141	186	−45
(Germany) / (Netherlands) 2025	Did not qualify							
(Hungary) 2027	TBD							
(Spain) 2029	TBD							
(Czech Republic) / (Poland) 2031	TBD							
Total	8/19	57	26	3	27	1609	1497	+118

=== European Championship ===
Year	Position	Pld	W	D	L	GS	GA	GD
(Germany) 1994	11th	6	2	0	4	126	135	−9
(Denmark) 1996	9th	6	2	0	4	141	144	−3
(Netherlands) 1998	7th	6	3	0	3	163	148	+15
(Romania) 2000	2nd	7	3	3	1	188	176	+12
(Denmark) 2002	12th	6	1	0	5	132	167	−35
(Hungary) 2004	6th	7	4	0	3	173	172	+1
(Sweden) 2006	13th	3	0	0	3	73	86	−13
(North Macedonia) 2008	10th	6	2	1	3	168	172	−4
(Denmark) / (Norway) 2010	12th	6	1	0	5	134	170	−36
(Serbia) 2012	14th	3	0	0	3	62	68	−6
(Hungary) / (Croatia) 2014	16th	3	0	0	3	68	89	−21
(Sweden) 2016	Did not qualify							
(France) 2018	Did not qualify							
(Denmark) / (Norway) 2020	Did not qualify							
(Slovenia) / (North Macedonia) / (Montenegro) 2022	Did not qualify							
(Austria) / (Hungary) / (Switzerland) 2024	23rd	3	0	0	3	64	100	−36
(Czech Republic) / (Poland) / (Romania) / (Slovakia) / (Turkey) 2026	Qualified							
(Denmark) / (Norway) / (Sweden) 2028	TBD							
(Belgium) / (France) 2030	TBD							
(Denmark) (Germany) (Poland) 2032	TBD							
Total	13/20	59	18	4	40	1492	1627	−135

=== Other tournaments ===
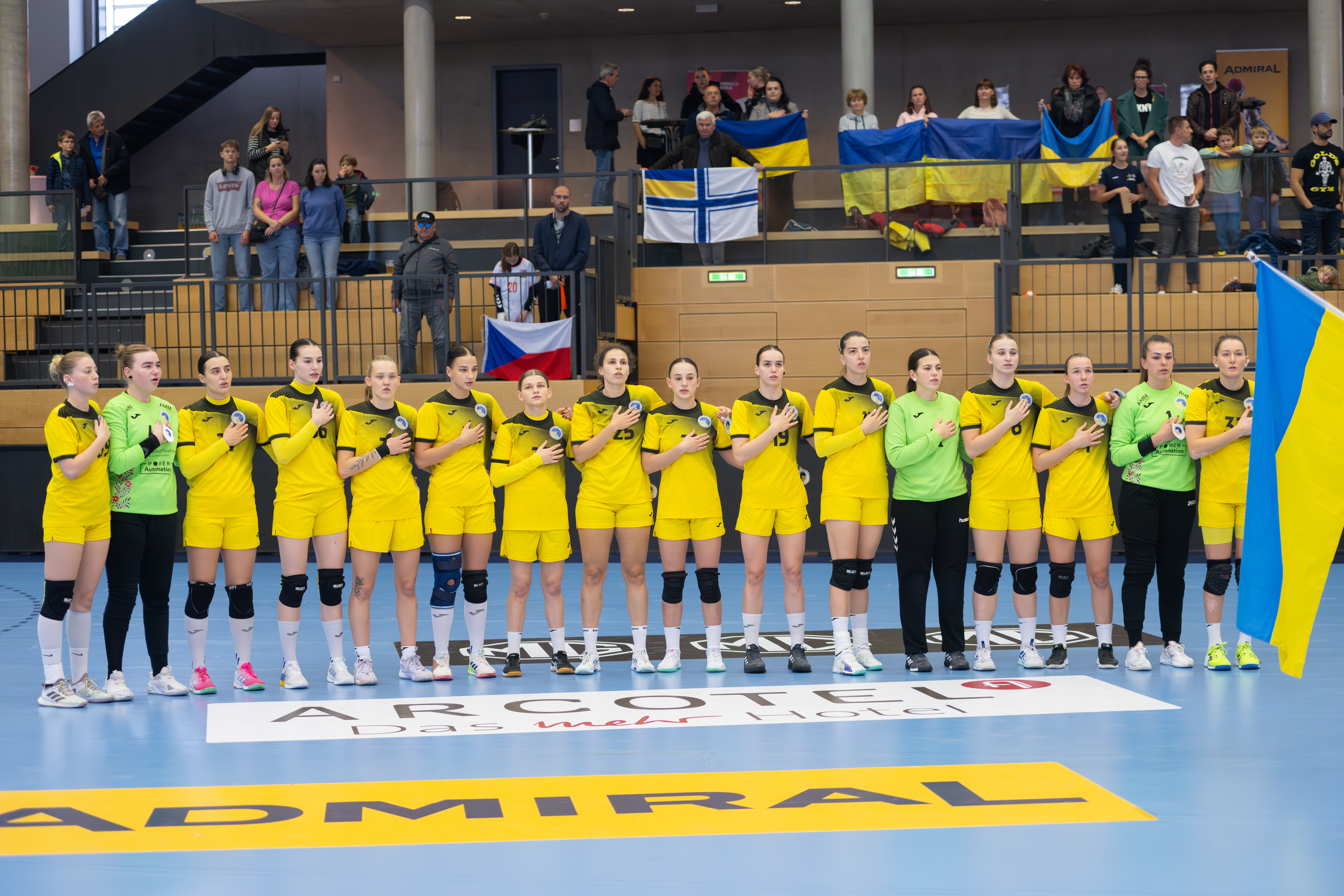
The National team in October 2024.

- 1992 Carpathian Trophy – Second place
- 1995 Carpathian Trophy – Third place
- 2000 Carpathian Trophy – Second place
- 2002 Carpathian Trophy – Winner
- 2006 GF World Cup – Fourth place
- 2008 Carpathian Trophy – Second place
- 2010 Carpathian Trophy – Third place
- 2012 Carpathian Trophy – Third place

== Current squad ==
Roster for the 2024 European Women's Handball Championship.

Head coach: Borys Chyzhov

No.	Pos.	Name	Date of birth (age)	Height	App.	Goals	Club
1	GK	Yudit Baloh	7 August 1995 (age 31)	1.78 m	29	0	(Hungary) Vasas SC
2	CB	Liubov Rosokha	21 September 2006 (age 20)	1.73 m	0	0	(Hungary) Kisvárdai KC
8	LB	Karina Soskyda	9 October 2005 (age 21)	1.79 m	10	19	(Slovakia) IUVENTA Michalovce
9	LB	Vanessa Lakatosh	8 June 2006 (age 20)	1.82 m	2	7	(Ukraine) HC Galychanka
10	P	Iryna Prokopiak	11 June 2003 (age 23)	1.78 m	16	12	(Ukraine) HC Galychanka
13	RW	Daria Korets	29 February 2004 (age 22)	1.74 m	0	0	(Ukraine) HC Spartak Kyiv
14	LW	Olha Makarenko	28 June 2001 (age 25)	1.70 m	0	0	(Ukraine) HC Spartak Kyiv
16	GK	Viktoriia Saltaniuk	8 October 2000 (age 26)	1.79 m	22	0	(Poland) KPR Kobierzyce
17	P	Andriyana Naumenko	12 December 1998 (age 27)	1.75 m	11	17	(Romania) HC Zalău
19	CB	Tamara Smbatian	19 March 1995 (age 31)	1.73 m	32	76	(Hungary) Alba Fehérvár KC
22	RW	Kateryna Kozak	6 December 2002 (age 23)	1.81 m	8	6	(Ukraine) HC Galychanka
24	CB	Sofiia Bezrukova	6 November 1999 (age 27)	1.78 m	0	0	(Czech Republic) Házená Kynžvart
30	LW	Anastasiia Tkach	15 June 2004 (age 22)	1.76 m	0	0	(Ukraine) HC Galychanka
33	LB	Iryna Kompaniiets	21 November 1993 (age 32)	1.76 m	29	48	(Slovakia) IUVENTA Michalovce
34	P	Karyna Kolodiuk	19 April 2001 (age 25)	1.80 m	7	13	(Ukraine) HC Karpaty Uzhhorod
37	LB	Valeriia Nesterenko	31 December 2004 (age 21)	1.80 m	4	11	(Ukraine) HC Karpaty Uzhhorod
69	GK	Mariia Poliak	15 March 2004 (age 22)	1.72 m	0	0	(Ukraine) HC Galychanka
77	P	Lilia Gorilska	26 February 1988 (age 38)	1.85 m	28	62	(Hungary) Moyra-Budaörs Handball
81	RB	Nhetely Ermina Minissale	5 April 2001 (age 25)	1.80 m	0	0	(Ukraine) HC Spartak Kyiv

== Notable former players ==
=== Goalkeepers ===
- Nataliya Borysenko
- Viktoriya Tymoshenkova
- Tetyana Vorozhtsova
- Svetlana Morozova
- Ganna Kryvoruchko
- Iryna Honcharova
- Larysa Zaspa

=== Right wings ===
- Olena Yatsenko
- Yulia Managarova
- Mariya Boklashchuk

=== Right backs ===
- Olha Nikolayenko
- Maryna Verhelyuk
- Olena Reznir
- Olga Layuk
- Olha Vashchuk
- Yulia Snopova
