= 2016–17 Magyar Kupa (women's handball) =

Hungarian women's handball season

Tournament details
- Country: Hungary
- Dates: 14 September 2016 – 2 April 2017
- Teams: 46

Final positions
- Champions: FTC-Rail Cargo Hungaria (12th title)
- Runners-up: Győri Audi ETO KC

Tournament statistics
- Matches played: 42 + 4 (Final four)

The 2016–17 Magyar Kupa, known as (Hungarian: TIPPMIX Török Bódog női Magyar Kupa) for sponsorship reasons, was the 59th edition of the tournament.

== Schedule ==
The rounds of the 2016–17 competition are scheduled as follows:

Round	Draw date and time	Matches
Round I	4 August 2016, 13:00 CEST	21 September 2016
Round II	29 September 2016, 13:00 CEST	19 October 2016
Round III	25 October 2016, 13:00 CEST	2 November 2016
Round IV	15 November 2016, 11:15 CET	4 January 2017
Quarter-finals	10 January 2017, 11:00 CET	15 February 2017
Final four	21 February 2017, 11:00 CET	1–2 April 2017

== Matches ==
A total of 46 matches will take place, starting with Round I on 14 September 2016 and culminating with the Final on 2 April 2017 at the Messzi István Sports Hall in Kecskemét.

=== Round I ===
The first round ties are scheduled for 14 – 21 September 2016.

Team 1	Score	Team 2
14 September
K. Szeged SE (I/B)	24–36	PC Trade-Szeged KKSE (I/B)
Gödi SE (I/B)	34–21	Szentendrei NKE (I/B)
15 September
Gárdony-Pázmánd NKSE (I/B)	31–35	Szombathelyi KKA (I/B)
21 September
Pénzügyőr SE (I/B)	35–29	Szent István SE (I/B)
Hajdúnánás SK (I/B)	30–23	Nyíradony VVTK (I/B)
Marcali VSZSE (I/B)	22–27	NEKA (I/B)
NKK Balmazújváros (I/B)	25–25 (a)	Eszterházy KFSC (I/B)
Szekszárdi FGKC (I/B)	26–23	Kozármisleny SE (I/B)
Sárvári Kinizsi SE (II)	17–32	Haladás VSE (I/B)
PTE-PEAC (II)	30–36	Rinyamenti KC (I/B)
Hódmezővásárhelyi LKC (I/B)	28–33	OXXO Energy-Orosházi NKC (I/B)
Rév-Hilltop (Count. I)	15–51	Vasas SC (I/B)
Csepel DSE (II)	30–33	Pilisvörösvári KSK (I/B)
Inárcs-Örkény KC (II)	23–30	HUFBAU-AKKER KNKSE (I/B)

=== Round II ===
The second round ties are scheduled for 11 – 19 October 2016.

Team 1	Score	Team 2
11 October
NEKA (I/B)	31–20	Mohácsi TE (I/B)
Haladás VSE (I/B)	18–37	Mosonmagyaróvári KC SE (I)
19 October
Eszterházy KFSC (I/B)	25–29	MTK Budapest (I)
OXXO Energy-Orosházi NKC (I/B)	22–26	Kisvárdai KC (I)
Hajdúnánás SK (I/B)	17–34	Békéscsabai ENKSE (I)
Szombathelyi KKA (I/B)	24–41	Alba Fehérvár KC (I)
Vasas SC (I/B)	29–22	Pénzügyőr SE (I/B)
Gödi SE (I/B)	22–36	IPress Center-Vác (I)
Csurgói NKC (I/B)	21–32	Szekszárdi FGKC (I/B)
Hajdúböszörményi TE (II)	15–35	PC Trade-Szeged KKSE (I/B)
Budaörs KC (I)	34–29	ELIOS Kispest NKK (I)
Pilisvörösvári KSK (I/B)	28–29	Kecskeméti NKSE (I/B)
VSK Tököl (II)	23–49	Dunaújvárosi Kohász KA (I)
Rinyamenti KC (I/B)	21–36	Siófok KC (I)

=== Round III ===
The third round ties are scheduled for 1 – 13 November 2016.

Team 1	Score	Team 2
1 November
PC Trade-Szeged KKSE (I/B)	24–24	Kisvárdai KC (I)
2 November
Alba Fehérvár KC (I)	32–29	Siófok KC (I)
Dunaújvárosi Kohász KA (I)	33–32	IPress Center-Vác (I)
Szekszárdi FGKC (I/B)	31–27	NEKA (I/B)
Vasas SC (I/B)	23–29	Mosonmagyaróvári KC SE (I)
Budaörs KC (I)	24–31	Érd (I)
Kecskeméti NKSE (I/B)	20–26	MTK Budapest (I)
13 November
Békéscsabai ENKSE (I)	27–27 (a)	DVSC-TvP (I)

=== Round IV ===
The fourth round ties are scheduled for 4 January 2017.

Team 1	Score	Team 2
4 January
PC Trade-Szeged KKSE (I/B)	14–33	Érd (I)
DVSC-TvP (I)	27–18	MTK Budapest (I)
Szekszárdi FGKC (I/B)	17–34	Dunaújvárosi Kohász KA (I)
Alba Fehérvár KC (I)	20–20 (a)	Mosonmagyaróvári KC SE (I)

=== Quarter-finals ===
The quarterfinals ties are scheduled for 15 February 2017.

Team 1	Score	Team 2
15 February
Mosonmagyaróvári KC SE (I)	20–31	Dunaújvárosi Kohász KA (I)
DVSC-TvP (I)	22–21	Érd (I)

== Final four ==
The final four will be held on 1–2 April 2017 at the Messzi István Sports Hall in Kecskemét.

Semi-finals
1 April, 14:10
Győri Audi ETO KC	34
DVSC-TvP	14
1 April, 16:10
FTC-Rail Cargo Hungaria	33
Dunaújvárosi Kohász KA	29

Final
2 April, 16:00
Győri Audi ETO KC	29 (3)
FTC-Rail Cargo Hungaria (pen.)	29 (5)
Bronze medal match
2 April, 13:45
DVSC-TvP	30
Dunaújvárosi Kohász KA	24

=== Awards ===
- Most valuable player: (Hungary) Zita Szucsánszki (FTC-Rail Cargo Hungaria)
- Best Goalkeeper: (Hungary) Blanka Bíró (FTC-Rail Cargo Hungaria)

=== Semi-finals ===
1 April 2017; 14:10 (CEST)	Győri Audi ETO KC	34 – 14	DVSC-TvP	Messzi István Sportcsarnok, Kecskemét; Attendance: 1,600; Referees: Felhő, Öcsi
1 April 2017; 14:10 (CEST)	Görbicz 6	(20–8)	Punko 3	Messzi István Sportcsarnok, Kecskemét; Attendance: 1,600; Referees: Felhő, Öcsi
1 April 2017; 14:10 (CEST)	2× (yellow card) 2× (suspension)	Report	3× (yellow card) 4× (suspension)	Messzi István Sportcsarnok, Kecskemét; Attendance: 1,600; Referees: Felhő, Öcsi

1 April 2017; 16:10 (CEST)	FTC-Rail Cargo Hungaria	33 – 29	Dunaújvárosi Kohász KA	Messzi István Sportcsarnok, Kecskemét; Attendance: 1,500; Referees: Bíró, Kiss
1 April 2017; 16:10 (CEST)	Szucsánszki, Kovacsics 7	(18–15)	A. Kovács 10	Messzi István Sportcsarnok, Kecskemét; Attendance: 1,500; Referees: Bíró, Kiss
1 April 2017; 16:10 (CEST)	3× (yellow card) 5× (suspension)	Report	1× (yellow card) 2× (suspension)	Messzi István Sportcsarnok, Kecskemét; Attendance: 1,500; Referees: Bíró, Kiss

=== Bronze medal match ===
2 April 2017; 13:45 (CEST)	DVSC-TvP	30 – 24	Dunaújvárosi Kohász KA	Messzi István Sportcsarnok, Kecskemét; Attendance: 1,500; Referees: Tomecskó-Hunyadi, Unyatinszki
2 April 2017; 13:45 (CEST)	Punko 7	(14–11)	A. Kovács 8	Messzi István Sportcsarnok, Kecskemét; Attendance: 1,500; Referees: Tomecskó-Hunyadi, Unyatinszki
2 April 2017; 13:45 (CEST)	3× (yellow card) 8× (suspension) 1× (red card)	Report	3× (yellow card) 3× (suspension)	Messzi István Sportcsarnok, Kecskemét; Attendance: 1,500; Referees: Tomecskó-Hunyadi, Unyatinszki

=== Final ===
2 April 2017
16:00 (CEST)
Győri Audi ETO KC
32 – 34 (p)
FTC-Rail Cargo Hungaria
Messzi István Sportcsarnok, Kecskemét
Attendance: 1,800
Referees: Dobrovits, Tájok
Görbicz, Amorim 7
(15–16)
Szucsánszki 9
4× (yellow card)
Report
3× (yellow card) 2× (suspension)

FT: 29–29 Pen: 3–5

2016–17 Magyar Kupa
Winner

FTC-Rail Cargo Hungaria
12th title

Bíró, Szikora (goalkeepers), Faluvégi, D. Hornyák, Jovanović, Kovacsics, Lukács, Mészáros,
Monori, Pena, Schatzl, Snelder, Szarka, Szekeres, Szöllősi-Zácsik, Szucsánszki (c)
Head coach
Gábor Elek

==== Final standings ====
	Team
	FTC-Rail Cargo Hungaria
Silver medal	Győri Audi ETO KC
Bronze medal	DVSC-TvP
	Dunaújvárosi Kohász KA

== See also ==
- 2016–17 Nemzeti Bajnokság I
- 2016–17 Nemzeti Bajnokság I/B
- 2016–17 Nemzeti Bajnokság II
