= 2010–11 Nemzeti Bajnokság I (women's handball) =

- League: Nemzeti Bajnokság I
- Sport: Team handball
- Duration: 2 September 2010 – 21 May 2011

Regular season
- Season champions: Győri ETO KC
- Top scorer: (Hungary) Tímea Tóth (188)

Playoffs
- NB I champions: Győri ETO KC
- NB I runners-up: Debreceni VSC

Nemzeti Bajnokság I seasons
- ← 2009–10 2011–12 →

The 2010–11 Nemzeti Bajnokság I was the sixtieth edition of the top level championship in the Hungarian team handball for women. The regular season started on 2 September 2010 with a clash between UKSE Szekszárd and defending champions Győri ETO KC, and ended on 27 March 2011, also including Győr, this time as hosts against Újbuda TC. The postseason began on 7 April 2011 and was concluded on 21 May 2011 with the final round classification groups. Győri Audi ETO KC went on to win all of their playoff matches and took their fourth consecutive title and eighth overall.

== Overview ==
Locations of the 2010–11 Nemzeti Bajnokság I teams

=== Teams ===
A total of twelve teams will contest the league, including nine sides from the 2009–10 Nemzeti Bajnokság I and three promoted teams from the 2009–10 Nemzeti Bajnokság I/B. Although officially only two clubs got relegated, ASA-Consolis Hódmezővásárhelyi NKC went close to bankruptcy and were unable to meet demands to enter the new season. All their players could and have moved away freely, and so did some quality youth prospects as well. In this situation the board adjudged there is not a long-term perspective to run the club and decided not to enter the championship and to cease the club. Since then, the handball in Hódmezővásárhely is represented by grassroot team Hódmezővásárhelyi Leány Kézilabda Club.

After the decision of pulling out, the Hungarian Handball Federation asked UKSE Szekszárd, the third-best team in the NB I/B last season (the second team of Győri Audi ETO KC finished ahead of them, but according to the rules they can not play in the same division as their parent team), whether they have the financial background and are able to join the league. They met all the criteria and replaced Hódmezővásárhelyi NKC not long before the new season began.

Other two dropped teams, Kiskunhalas NKSE-Bravotel and Hunnia KSK had an everyday fight for the survive, and it stamped their performances: both of them achieved only a single win during the regular season and were unable to improve in the postseason thus fallen out hopeless.

Beside the unexpected promotion of UKSE Szekszárd the two winners of NB I/B have climbed into the top division: ÉTV-Érdi VSE from the Western Group with an impressive 25-1-0 balance and Bugyi SE-Újbuda from the Eastern Group. The latter one moved from Bugyi to Budaörs and later to Újbuda, changing their name simply to Újbuda TC for the new season.

Last year's league champions Győri ETO KC and silver medallists DVSC-Korvex compete in the 2010–11 EHF Champions League, while Budapest Bank-Békéscsabai Előre NKSE alongside SYMA Váci NKSE enter the 2010–11 EHF Cup. Despite lost to Győr in the Hungarian Cup final, Ferencvárosi TC advanced to the 2010–11 EHF Cup Winners' Cup as ETO already secured a Champions League spot.

=== Sponsorship changes ===
Five out of the twelve NBI teams have signed new name sponsorship deals for the new season. Just after the end of the 2009–2010 season, on 2 June 2010, Váci NKSE club director András Németh announced in a press conference, that from the next year the team will compete under the name SYMA Váci NKSE after their new sponsor. Mobile phone distributor RightPhone, which have been under contract with Ferencváros last year, have agreed a one-year deal with Alcoa FKC thus changing club name to Alcoa FKC RightPhone. Budapest Bank, patronizing Hungarian handball for years, have tightened the relationship with Békéscsaba and became their main financial supporter. Dunaújváros, which have faced the threat of dissolution two years ago, secured a one-year deal with Regale Klímatechnika Kft., altering their name to Dunaúvárosi Regale Klíma.

From 2 October 2010 Ferencváros were known as FTC-Jógazdabank by signing a contract with Jógazda Szövetkezeti Takarékpénztár. The financial company stated, that their long-term plan is to "make Ferencváros a dominant team both in domestic and international level." However, it came like a bolt from the blue, when on 3 January 2011, just two months after the sponsoring contract was signed, the Hungarian Financial Supervisory Authority reported that they have revoked the license of the bank and simultaneously have initiated the liquidation process. As board president Zsolt Ákos Jeney revealed, by losing their name sponsor they count with a loss of a staggering 25 percent of their planned budget. He added also, that the management immediately held talks with other sponsors, which ensured them of their support and even backed the idea to increase their financial contribution in the future.

Meanwhile, the club management was also looking for a new sponsor, which they found in a relatively short time: Ferencvárosi TC have called a press conference for 3 February 2011, where they announced Rail Cargo Hungaria Zrt. as their new naming sponsor. Imre Kovács, CEO of the rail logistics company, have stated that social responsibility is an integral part their policy and they are ready to support the development of valuable communities with financial injections. Under the terms of agreement, the club has been renamed to FTC-Rail Cargo Hungaria.

Siófok KC, that already began to prepare for the next season, agreed a sponsorship contract with Galerius Wellness and Spa Center on 5 May 2011. As a result, the team wear the name of the bath and compete under the name Siófok KC-Galerius Fürdő until 31 December 2011.

=== Arenas and locations ===
Team	Location	Arena	Capacity
Alcoa FKC RightPhone	Székesfehérvár	Köfém Sportcsarnok	1,200
Budapest Bank-Békéscsabai Előre NKSE	Békéscsaba	Városi Sportcsarnok	2,300
Dunaújvárosi Regale Klíma	Dunaújváros	Dunaújvárosi Sportcsarnok	1,200
DVSC-Korvex	Debrecen	Hódos Imre Rendezvénycsarnok	1,800
ÉTV-Érdi VSE	Érd	Batthyány Sportcsarnok	500
FTC-Rail Cargo Hungaria	Ferencváros, Budapest	Főtáv FTC Kézilabda Aréna	1,300
Győri Audi ETO KC	Győr	Magvassy Mihály Sportcsarnok	2,800
Siófok KC-Galerius Fürdő	Siófok	Beszédes József Sportcsarnok	550
SYMA Váci NKSE	Vác	Városi Sportcsarnok	1,200
UKSE Szekszárd	Szekszárd	Városi Sportközpont	1,200
Újbuda TC	Újbuda, Budapest	Gabányi László Sportcsarnok	500
Veszprém Barabás KC	Veszprém	Veszprém Aréna	5,000

== Regular season ==
=== Results ===
Home \ Away	ALC	BEK	DFE	DKO	ERD	FTC	GYO	SKC	SYV	USZ	UTC	VKC
Alcoa FKC RightPhone		38–31	32–27	34–30	26–30	17–34	23–34	33–24	35–34	36–32	39–22	30–26
Budapest Bank-Békéscsabai ENKSE	25–23		25–26	21–22	35–26	25–25	22–28	31–23	28–24	37–25	34–18	26–20
Dunaújvárosi Regale Klíma	29–22	25–30		29–33	29–26	32–37	22–32	38–22	29–35	36–23	46–19	34–27
DVSC-Korvex	38–27	30–25	38–27		39–27	29–26	22–35	38–25	30–27	35–18	37–23	31–26
ÉTV-Érdi VSE	32–32	24–29	22–28	26–32		22–33	24–25	32–25	26–33	39–22	30–24	29–29
FTC-Rail Cargo Hungaria	37–24	30–26	28–27	28–27	34–30		23–30	36–22	27–23	44–33	44–17	38–21
Győri Audi ETO KC	37–26	33–24	32–28	32–26	30–22	33–21		36–20	34–25	43–23	38–19	32–19
Siófok KC-Galerius Fürdő	29–32	25–24	27–27	26–33	24–35	26–38	14–41		26–32	24–20	30–26	30–33
SYMA Váci NKSE	34–30	31–32	37–31	30–26	39–30	26–17	25–32	46–21		46–20	43–20	31–26
UKSE Szekszárd	26–31	24–35	23–30	23–40	22–30	28–38	21–42	22–23	24–37		30–28	25–31
Újbuda TC	20–27	24–29	19–24	23–35	18–35	22–32	22–43	25–26	17–28	32–27		24–31
Veszprém Barabás KC	28–29	29–23	36–28	22–29	36–26	34–37	22–35	25–23	25–30	35–26	31–24	

Legend: Blue = home team win; Yellow = draw; Red = away team win.

=== League table ===
Pos	Team	Pld	W	D	L	GF	GA	GD	Pts	Qualification
1	Győri Audi ETO KC	22	22	0	0	757	493	+264	44	Qualified for the Play-off Round
2	FTC-Rail Cargo Hungaria	22	17	1	4	707	584	+123	35	Qualified for the Play-off Round
3	DVSC-Korvex	22	17	0	5	700	580	+120	34	Qualified for the Play-off Round
4	SYMA Váci NKSE	22	15	0	7	716	586	+130	30	Qualified for the Play-off Round
5	Alcoa FKC RightPhone	22	12	1	9	646	659	−13	25	Qualified for the Classification Round 5–8
6	Budapest Bank-Békéscsabai ENKSE	22	12	1	9	617	573	+44	25	Qualified for the Classification Round 5–8
7	Dunaújvárosi Regale Klíma	22	10	1	11	652	625	+27	21	Qualified for the Classification Round 5–8
8	Veszprém Barabás KC	22	9	1	12	622	640	−18	19	Qualified for the Classification Round 5–8
9	ÉTV-Érdi VSE	22	7	2	13	623	644	−21	16	Qualified for the Classification Round 9–12
10	Siófok KC-Galerius Fürdő	22	5	1	16	535	703	−168	11	Qualified for the Classification Round 9–12
11	Újbuda TC	22	1	0	21	486	739	−253	2	Qualified for the Classification Round 9–12
12	UKSE Szekszárd	22	1	0	21	537	772	−235	2	Qualified for the Classification Round 9–12

=== Individual statistics ===
==== Top scorers ====
Rank	Player	Club	Matches	Goals
1	(Hungary) Tímea Tóth	SYMA Váci NKSE / ÉTV-Érdi VSE	21	188
2	(Russia) Kristina Trishchuk	Alcoa FKC RightPhone	20	153
3	(Hungary) Bernadett Ferling	Dunaújvárosi Regale Klíma	21	144
4	(Hungary) Ivett Szepesi	Siófok KC-Galerius Fürdő	22	142
5	(Ukraine) Olha Nikolayenko	Budapest Bank-Békéscsabai ENKSE	21	138
6	(Hungary) Zita Weigel	UKSE Szekszárd	22	126
7	(Hungary) Ibolya Mehlmann	Veszprém Barabás KC	22	120
8	(Hungary) Mónika Kovacsicz	FTC-Rail Cargo Hungaria	21	115
8	(Hungary) Zita Szucsánszki	FTC-Rail Cargo Hungaria	21	115
10	(Hungary) Zsuzsanna Tomori	FTC-Rail Cargo Hungaria	22	114

==== Worst disciplines ====
Rank	Player	Club	YC	2m	RC
1	(Hungary) Ibolya Mehlmann	Veszprém Barabás KC	14	31	3
2	(Hungary) Dusmáta Takács	Dunaújvárosi Regale Klíma	11	31	3
3	(Ukraine) Olha Vashchuk	Alcoa FKC RightPhone	11	23	4
4	(Hungary) Gabriella Gáspár	Dunaújvárosi Regale Klíma	10	27	2
5	(Hungary) Anett Kisfaludy	ÉTV-Érdi VSE	18	24	1
6	(Hungary) Krisztina Gulya	UKSE Szekszárd	12	21	2
6	(Hungary) Zsuzsanna Tóth	Siófok KC-Galerius Fürdő	9	25	1
8	(Serbia) Leposava Glušica	Budapest Bank-Békéscsabai ENKSE	10	21	2
9	(Hungary) Éva Fauszt	UKSE Szekszárd	8	17	1
9	(Hungary) Melinda Tamás	Újbuda TC	6	18	1

=== Team statistics ===
==== Overall ====
- Most wins – Győri Audi ETO KC (22)
- Fewest wins – Újbuda TC and UKSE Szekszárd (1)
- Most losses – Újbuda TC and UKSE Szekszárd (21)
- Fewest losses – Győri Audi ETO KC (0)
- Most goals scored – Győri Audi ETO KC (757)
- Fewest goals scored – Újbuda TC (486)
- Most goals conceded – UKSE Szekszárd (772)
- Fewest goals conceded – Győri Audi ETO KC (493)
- Best goal difference - Győri Audi ETO KC (+264)
- Worst goal difference - Újbuda TC (−253)

==== Home ====
- Most wins – Győri Audi ETO KC (11)
- Fewest wins – Újbuda TC and UKSE Szekszárd (1)
- Most losses – Újbuda TC and UKSE Szekszárd (10)
- Fewest losses – Győri Audi ETO KC (0)
- Most goals scored – SYMA Váci NKSE (388)
- Fewest goals scored – Újbuda TC (246)
- Most goals conceded – UKSE Szekszárd (365)
- Fewest goals conceded – Győri Audi ETO KC (253)

==== Away ====
- Most wins – Győri Audi ETO KC (11)
- Fewest wins – Újbuda TC and UKSE Szekszárd (0)
- Most losses – Újbuda TC and UKSE Szekszárd (11)
- Fewest losses – Győri Audi ETO KC (0)
- Most goals scored – Győri Audi ETO KC (377)
- Fewest goals scored – Újbuda TC (240)
- Most goals conceded – UKSE Szekszárd (407)
- Fewest goals conceded – Győri Audi ETO KC (240)

==== Scoring ====
- Widest winning margin: 27 goals –
  - Dunaújvárosi Regale Klíma 46–19 Újbuda TC (15 September 2010)
  - FTC-Rail Cargo Hungaria 44–17 Újbuda TC (17 November 2010)
  - Siófok KC-Galerius Fürdő 14–41 Győri Audi ETO KC (24 March 2011)
- Most goals in a match: 77 goals –
  - FTC-Rail Cargo Hungaria 44–33 UKSE Szekszárd (2 February 2011)
- Fewest goals in a match: 43 goals –
  - Budapest Bank-Békécsabai Előre NKSE 21–22 DVSC-Korvex (8 September 2010)
  - SYMA Váci NKSE 26–17 FTC-Rail Cargo Hungaria (28 December 2010)
  - Újbuda TC 19–24 Dunaújvárosi Regale Klíma (22 January 2011)
- Most goals scored by losing team: 34 goals –
  - Alcoa FKC RightPhone 35–34 SYMA Váci NKSE (5 March 2011)
  - Veszprém Barabás KC 34–37 FTC-Rail Cargo Hungaria (8 September 2010)
- Most goals scored in a match by one player: 15 goals –
  - Bojana Radulovics for Dunaújvárosi Regale Klíma against Alcoa FKC RightPhone (2 October 2010)
  - Kristina Trishchuk for Alcoa FKC RightPhone against Veszprém Barabás KC (28 December 2010)

== Postseason ==
=== Classification round 9–12 ===
Teams finished in bottom four positions after the regular season enter the classification round for 9–12 places, where a double round-robin system is used. In addition, they are given bonus points depending on their final ranking in the league phase of the championship. Érd, which took the ninth spot, were given four points, tenth placed Siófok were awarded three, Újbuda TC took two points while last placed UKSE Szekszárd got one point. Clubs with the two lowest combined points get relegated.

==== Results ====
Home \ Away	ERD	SKC	USZ	UTC
ÉTV-Érdi VSE		29–28	35–29	27–21
Siófok KC-Galerius Fürdő	28–27		26–21	32–19
UKSE Szekszárd	25–37	34–29		39–22
Újbuda TC	17–28	19–33	27–28	

Legend: Blue = home team win; Yellow = draw; Red = away team win.

==== Table ====
Pos	Team	Pld	W	D	L	GF	GA	GD	BP	Pts
1	ÉTV-Érdi VSE	6	5	0	1	183	148	+35	4	14
2	Siófok KC-Galerius Fürdő	6	4	0	2	176	149	+27	3	11
3	UKSE Szekszárd	6	3	0	3	176	176	0	1	7
4	Újbuda TC	6	0	0	6	125	187	−62	2	2

Additional points that were awarded after the final positions in the regular season are indicated in bonus points column.

=== Classification round 5–8 ===
Similarly to the classification round of 9–12, the teams play twice against each other, on a home and on an away leg. Furthermore, they are rewarded with bonus points that are added to the points they win in the postseason and their combined total points decide the final ranking.

==== Results ====
Home \ Away	ALC	BEK	DUN	VKC
Alcoa FKC RightPhone		32–28	33–29	32–28
Budapest Bank-Békéscsabai ENKSE	38–26		30–27	28–23
Dunaújvárosi Regale Klíma	31–33	34–23		35–31
Veszprém Barabás KC	21–33	33–30	28–28	

Legend: Blue = home team win; Yellow = draw; Red = away team win.

==== Table ====
Pos	Team	Pld	W	D	L	GF	GA	GD	BP	Pts
1	Alcoa FKC RightPhone	6	5	0	1	189	175	+14	4	14
2	Budapest Bank-Békéscsabai ENKSE	6	3	0	3	175	173	+2	3	9
3	Dunaújvárosi Regale Klíma	6	2	1	3	184	178	+6	2	7
4	Veszprém Barabás KC	6	1	1	4	164	186	−22	1	4

Additional points that were awarded after the final positions in the regular season are indicated in the bonus points column.

=== Championship playoff ===
Győri Audi ETO KC were proved invincible in the regular season once again and thus deservedly took the top spot of the championship playoff, having been drawn together with SYMA Váci NKSE, that finished in fourth position. Meanwhile, FTC-Rail Cargo Hungaria secured the second place after a hard-fought final day victory over Vác, which was just enough to end the regular season one point ahead of DVSC-Korvex, against them they begin the playoff campaign, where a best-of-three knockout is used. If a match ends with a draw, instead of playing extra time halves, the winner is decided by penalty shootout.

==== Bracket ====
Semifinals
Győri Audi ETO KC	2
SYMA Váci NKSE	0
FTC-Rail Cargo Hungaria	1
DVSC-Korvex	2

Finals
Győri Audi ETO KC	2
DVSC-Korvex	0
Third place playoffs
FTC-Rail Cargo Hungaria	2
SYMA Váci NKSE	0

==== Semifinals ====
===== Győri Audi ETO KC vs. SYMA Váci NKSE =====
13 April 2011; 18:00	Győri Audi ETO KC	24 – 18	SYMA Váci NKSE	Magvassy Mihály Sportcsarnok, Győr; Attendance: 1,000; Referees: Nagy, Túróczy (Hungary)
13 April 2011; 18:00	Mayer 4	(13–8)	Vaszari 6	Magvassy Mihály Sportcsarnok, Győr; Attendance: 1,000; Referees: Nagy, Túróczy (Hungary)
13 April 2011; 18:00	3× (yellow card) 6× (suspension)	Report	2× (yellow card) 3× (suspension)	Magvassy Mihály Sportcsarnok, Győr; Attendance: 1,000; Referees: Nagy, Túróczy (Hungary)

28 April 2011; 18:00	SYMA Váci NKSE	31 – 34	Győri Audi ETO KC	Városi Sportcsarnok, Vác; Attendance: 700; Referees: Andorka, Hucker (Hungary)
28 April 2011; 18:00	Vaszari 7	(15–22)	Görbicz 9	Városi Sportcsarnok, Vác; Attendance: 700; Referees: Andorka, Hucker (Hungary)
28 April 2011; 18:00	2× (yellow card) 1× (suspension)	Report	2× (yellow card) 5× (suspension)	Városi Sportcsarnok, Vác; Attendance: 700; Referees: Andorka, Hucker (Hungary)

Győri Audi ETO KC won series 2–0

===== FTC-Rail Cargo Hungaria vs. DVSC-Korvex =====
7 April 2011; 18:00	FTC-Rail Cargo Hungaria	32 – 38	DVSC-Korvex	Főtáv FTC Kézilabda Aréna, Budapest; Attendance: 1,000; Referees: Kékes, Kékes (Hungary)
7 April 2011; 18:00	Tomori 9	(15–15)	Bogdanovics, Bognár, Sopronyi 6	Főtáv FTC Kézilabda Aréna, Budapest; Attendance: 1,000; Referees: Kékes, Kékes (Hungary)
7 April 2011; 18:00	1× (yellow card) 1× (suspension)	Report	3× (yellow card) 4× (suspension)	Főtáv FTC Kézilabda Aréna, Budapest; Attendance: 1,000; Referees: Kékes, Kékes (Hungary)

14 April 2011; 18:00	DVSC-Korvex	29 – 34	FTC-Rail Cargo Hungaria	Hódos Imre Rendezvénycsarnok, Debrecen; Attendance: 1,900; Referees: Nyárádi, Hanufer (Hungary)
14 April 2011; 18:00	Bogdanovics 6	(17–22)	Szucsánszki, Szádvári, Tomori 7	Hódos Imre Rendezvénycsarnok, Debrecen; Attendance: 1,900; Referees: Nyárádi, Hanufer (Hungary)
14 April 2011; 18:00	3× (yellow card) 1× (suspension)	Report	3× (yellow card) 4× (suspension)	Hódos Imre Rendezvénycsarnok, Debrecen; Attendance: 1,900; Referees: Nyárádi, Hanufer (Hungary)

1 May 2011; 15:00	FTC-Rail Cargo Hungaria	31–33 (pen.)	DVSC-Korvex	Főtáv FTC Kézilabda Aréna, Budapest; Attendance: 1,200; Referees: Bonifert, Oláh (Hungary)
1 May 2011; 15:00	Szucsánszki 8	(19–15, 29–29)	Bogdanovics, Bognár 6	Főtáv FTC Kézilabda Aréna, Budapest; Attendance: 1,200; Referees: Bonifert, Oláh (Hungary)
1 May 2011; 15:00	2× (yellow card) 4× (suspension)	Report	3× (yellow card) 7× (suspension) 1× (red card)	Főtáv FTC Kézilabda Aréna, Budapest; Attendance: 1,200; Referees: Bonifert, Oláh (Hungary)

DVSC-Korvex won series 2–1

==== Third place playoffs ====
12 May 2011; 18:00	FTC-Rail Cargo Hungaria	31 – 28	SYMA Váci NKSE	Főtáv FTC Kézilabda Aréna, Budapest; Attendance: 500; Referees: Nagy, Túróczy (Hungary)
12 May 2011; 18:00	Zácsik 7	(16–16)	Rédei-Soós 7	Főtáv FTC Kézilabda Aréna, Budapest; Attendance: 500; Referees: Nagy, Túróczy (Hungary)
12 May 2011; 18:00	3× (yellow card) 7× (suspension)	Report	1× (yellow card) 3× (suspension)	Főtáv FTC Kézilabda Aréna, Budapest; Attendance: 500; Referees: Nagy, Túróczy (Hungary)

18 May 2011; 18:00	SYMA Váci NKSE	30 – 36	FTC-Rail Cargo Hungaria	Városi Sportcsarnok, Vác; Attendance: 800; Referees: Kékes, Kékes (Hungary)
18 May 2011; 18:00	Tápai 8	(16–15)	Szucsánszki 12	Városi Sportcsarnok, Vác; Attendance: 800; Referees: Kékes, Kékes (Hungary)
18 May 2011; 18:00	3× (yellow card) 2× (suspension)	Report	3× (yellow card) 2× (suspension)	Városi Sportcsarnok, Vác; Attendance: 800; Referees: Kékes, Kékes (Hungary)

FTC-Rail Cargo Hungaria won series 2–0

==== Finals ====
7 May 2011; 11:00	Győri Audi ETO KC	34 – 26	DVSC-Korvex	Magvassy Mihály Sportcsarnok, Győr; Attendance: 1,300; Referees: Pech, Vágvölgyi (Hungary)
7 May 2011; 11:00	Mayer 9	(16–12)	Bogdanovics 9	Magvassy Mihály Sportcsarnok, Győr; Attendance: 1,300; Referees: Pech, Vágvölgyi (Hungary)
7 May 2011; 11:00	3× (yellow card) 4× (suspension)	Report	3× (yellow card) 5× (suspension)	Magvassy Mihály Sportcsarnok, Győr; Attendance: 1,300; Referees: Pech, Vágvölgyi (Hungary)

14 May 2011; 12:50	DVSC-Korvex	25 – 28	Győri Audi ETO KC	Hódos Imre Rendezvénycsarnok, Debrecen; Attendance: 1,200; Referees: Horváth, Marton (Hungary)
14 May 2011; 12:50	Bognár, Mörtel 5	(13–18)	Brădeanu 7	Hódos Imre Rendezvénycsarnok, Debrecen; Attendance: 1,200; Referees: Horváth, Marton (Hungary)
14 May 2011; 12:50	3× (yellow card) 3× (suspension)	Report	3× (yellow card) 5× (suspension)	Hódos Imre Rendezvénycsarnok, Debrecen; Attendance: 1,200; Referees: Horváth, Marton (Hungary)

Győri Audi ETO KC won series 2–0

== Final standing ==
Rank	Team	Qualification or relegation
1	Győri Audi ETO KC	2011–12 EHF Champions League Group stage
2	DVSC-Korvex	2011–12 EHF Champions League Second qualifying round
3	FTC-Rail Cargo Hungaria	2011–12 EHF Cup Winners' Cup ^{1}
4	SYMA Váci NKSE	2011–12 EHF Cup
5	Alcoa FKC RightPhone	2011–12 EHF Cup Winners' Cup ^{2}
6	Budapest Bank-Békéscsabai Előre NKSE	2011–12 EHF Cup
7	Dunaújvárosi Regale Klíma	
8	Veszprém Barabás KC	
9	ÉTV-Érdi VSE	
10	Siófok KC-Galerius Fürdő	
11	UKSE Szekszárd ^{3}	
12	Újbuda TC	Relegation to the 2011–12 Nemzeti Bajnokság I/B

^{1} FTC-Rail Cargo Hungaria have advanced to the 2011–12 EHF Cup Winners' Cup as title holders.

^{2} Because both 2010–2011 Magyar Kupa finalists qualified for the EHF Champions League via their league position, the EHF Cup Winners' Cup place is passed to Alcoa FKC RightPhone as cup thirds.
^{3} Following 2010–11 Nemzeti Bajnokság I/B Western Group champions Mohácsi TE have declined the promotion due to financial reasons, UKSE Szekszárd maintained its top division membership.

2010–11 Nemzeti Bajnokság I champions

Győri Audi ETO KC
Eighth title

Team roster

Eduarda Amorim, Krisztina Bárány, Aurelia Brădeanu, Anita Görbicz, Ana Gros, Ágnes Hornyák, Anikó Kovacsics, Ivett Kurucz, Katrine Lunde Haraldsen, Szabina Mayer, Katarína Mravíková, Adrienn Orbán, Katalin Pálinger, Bettina Pásztor, Fruzsina Palkó, Szimonetta Planéta, Simona Spiridon, Patricia Szölösi, Eszter Tóth and Orsolya Vérten.
Head coach: Csaba Konkoly.
