= Ágnes Végh =

Hungarian handball player (born 1939)

Medal record

Representing Hungary

Women's Handball

World Championship
Gold medal – first place	1965 West Germany	Team

Ágnes Végh (born 1939 in Budapest) is a former Hungarian handballer who played in right back position. A one club player, Végh spent her entire career by Budapesti Spartacus SC, for them she played from 1955 to 1968. She won the Hungarian Championship seven times (1960, 1961, 1962, 1963, 1964, 1965, 1967) and triumphed in the Hungarian Cup twice (1963, 1968). She was also member of the European Champions Cup finalist team in 1965. In 1967 she was voted the best female handballer in Hungary.

Végh won 51 caps for the Hungarian national team between 1960 and 1968, during which time she took part on two World Championships in 1962 and 1965, capturing the gold medal in the latter one.

== Awards ==
- Hungarian Handballer of the Year: 1967
