= Elik (surname) =

Elik is a surname. Notable people with the surname include:

- Amy Elik (fl. from 1997), American politician
- Boris Elik (1929–2013), Canadian ice hockey player
- Todd Elik (born 1966), Canadian ice hockey player

== See also ==
- Elek (surname)
