= Hungarian Handballer of the Year =

The Hungarian Handballer of the Year award is an annual prize, which is given to the Hungarian handballer who is considered to have performed the best over the previous calendar year.

Presented by the Hungarian Handball Federation since 1964, the most successful handball player is Anita Görbicz, with six nominations.

During the long history of the award, only one handballer playing abroad has received the title, namely László Nagy in 2009, who played for FC Barcelona Handbol at that time.

== List of winners ==
Year	Men		Woman	
Year	Handballer	Club	Handballer	Club
1964	László Kovács	(Hungary) Bp. Honvéd SE	Mária Tóth	(Hungary) Óbudai Goldberger SE
1965	László Kovács (2)	(Hungary) Bp. Honvéd SE	Anna Rothermel	(Hungary) VM Közért
1966	István Marosi	(Hungary) Ózdi Kohász	Erzsébet Bognár	(Hungary) Ferencvárosi TC
1967	Sándor Kaló	(Hungary) Tatabányai Bányász SC	Ágnes Végh	(Hungary) Bp. Spartacus SC
1968	Lajos Simó	(Hungary) Tatabányai Bányász SC	Mária Holub	(Hungary) Pécsi Bányász
1969	award not given			
1970	Lajos Simó (2)	(Hungary) Tatabányai Bányász SC	Ágnes Babos	(Hungary) Vasas SC
1971	Sándor Vass	(Hungary) Elektromos SE	Márta Giba	(Hungary) Vasas SC
1972	János Stiller	(Hungary) Bp. Spartacus SC	Ágnes Babos (2)	(Hungary) Vasas SC
1973	Lajos Simó (3)	(Hungary) Tatabányai Bányász SC	Ágota Bujdosó	(Hungary) Vasas SC
1974	Károly Vass	(Hungary) Elektromos SE	Amália Sterbinszky	(Hungary) Vasas SC
1975	István Varga	(Hungary) Debreceni Dózsa	Ágota Bujdosó (2)	(Hungary) Vasas SC
1976	István Szilágyi	(Hungary) Ferencvárosi TC	Amália Sterbinszky (2)	(Hungary) Vasas SC
1977	Péter Kovács	(Hungary) Bp. Honvéd SE	Amália Sterbinszky (3)	(Hungary) Vasas SC
1978	Sándor Kaló (2)	(Hungary) Tatabányai Bányász SC	Mária Vanya	(Hungary) Vasas SC
1979	Béla Bartalos	(Hungary) Tatabányai Bányász SC	Marianna Nagy	(Hungary) Vasas SC
1980	Péter Kovács (2)	(Hungary) Bp. Honvéd SE	Marianna Nagy (2)	(Hungary) Vasas SC
1981	Péter Kovács (3)	(Hungary) Bp. Honvéd SE	Marianna Nagy (3)	(Hungary) Vasas SC
1982	Péter Kovács (4)	(Hungary) Bp. Honvéd SE	Marianna Nagy (4)	(Hungary) Vasas SC
1983	Péter Kovács (5)	(Hungary) Bp. Honvéd SE	Anna György	(Hungary) Építők SC
1984	László Hoffmann	(Hungary) Tatabányai Bányász SC	Zsuzsa Nyári	(Hungary) Bakony Vegyész
1985	Mihály Kovács	(Hungary) Elektromos SE	Marianna Nagy (5)	(Hungary) Vasas SC
1986	Mihály Kovács (2)	(Hungary) Elektromos SE	Marianna Rácz	(Hungary) Vasas SC
1987	László Marosi	(Hungary) Tatabányai Bányász SC	Katalin Szilágyi	(Hungary) Debreceni MVSC
1988	László Marosi (2)	(Hungary) Tatabányai Bányász SC	Csilla Elekes	(Hungary) Bp. Spartacus SC
1989	Mihály Iváncsik	(Hungary) Rába ETO	Beatrix Kökény	(Hungary) Építők SC
1990	Jakab Sibalin	(Hungary) Tatabányai Bányász SC	Györgyi Hang	(Hungary) Secotex Szeged
1991	Attila Horváth	(Hungary) Elektromos SE	Beatrix Kökény (2)	(Hungary) Hargita KC
1992	József Éles	(Hungary) Bramac VSE	Erzsébet Kocsis	(Hungary) Dunaferr SE
1993	József Éles (2)	(Hungary) Fotex VSE	Éva Erdős	(Hungary) Vasas-Dreher
1994	György Zsigmond	(Hungary) Fotex VSE	Erzsébet Kocsis (2)	(Hungary) Dunaferr SE
1995	István Gulyás	(Hungary) Fotex VSE	Beatrix Kökény (3)	(Hungary) FTC-Polgári Bank
1996	István Pásztor	(Hungary) Fotex KC	Eszter Mátéfi	(Hungary) Győri Keksz ETO KC
1997	József Éles (3)	(Hungary) Fotex Veszprém KC	Beatrix Balogh	(Hungary) Dunaferr SE
1998	János Szathmári	(Hungary) Fotex KCV	Beáta Siti	(Hungary) Dunaferr SE
1999	István Pásztor (2)	(Hungary) Fotex KCV	Beáta Siti (2)	(Hungary) Dunaferr SE
2000	Árpád Mohácsi	(Hungary) Nyíregyházi KC (until 1999/00) (Hungary) Dunaferr SE (from 2000/01)	Bojana Radulovics	(Hungary) Dunaferr SE
2001	István Pásztor (3)	(Hungary) Fotex KCV	Ágnes Farkas	(Hungary) Herz-FTC
2002	Árpád Sterbik	(Hungary) Fotex KCV	Ágnes Farkas (2)	(Hungary) Herz-FTC
2003	Carlós Pérez	(Hungary) Fotex KCV	Katalin Pálinger	(Hungary) Dunaferr SE
2004	Carlós Pérez (2)	(Hungary) Fotex KCV	Katalin Pálinger (2)	(Hungary) Dunaferr SE
2005	Carlós Pérez (3)	(Hungary) MKB Veszprém KC	Anita Görbicz	(Hungary) Győri Graboplast ETO KC
2006	Gyula Gál	(Hungary) MKB Veszprém KC	Anita Görbicz (2)	(Hungary) Győri Audi ETO KC
2007	Nenad Puljezevics	(Hungary) Pick Szeged	Anita Görbicz (3)	(Hungary) Győri Audi ETO KC
2008	Tamás Iváncsik	(Hungary) MKB Veszprém KC	Orsolya Vérten	(Hungary) Győri Audi ETO KC
2009	László Nagy	(Spain) FC Barcelona Borges	Orsolya Vérten (2)	(Hungary) Győri Audi ETO KC
2010	Gergő Iváncsik	(Hungary) MKB Veszprém KC	Katalin Pálinger (3)	(Hungary) Győri Audi ETO KC
2011	Carlós Pérez (4)	(Hungary) MKB Veszprém KC	Zita Szucsánszki	(Hungary) FTC-Rail Cargo Hungaria
2012	Gábor Császár	(Hungary) MKB Veszprém KC	Zsuzsanna Tomori	(Hungary) FTC-Rail Cargo Hungaria
2013	László Nagy (2)	(Hungary) MKB-MVM Veszprém KC	Anita Görbicz (4)	(Hungary) Győri Audi ETO KC
2014	Roland Mikler	(Hungary) Pick Szeged (until 2013/14) (Hungary) MKB-MVM Veszprém KC (from 2014/15)	Anita Görbicz (5)	(Hungary) Győri Audi ETO KC
2015	László Nagy (3)	(Hungary) MVM Veszprém KC	Zita Szucsánszki (2)	(Hungary) FTC-Rail Cargo Hungaria
2016	László Nagy (4)	(Hungary) Telekom Veszprém	Zita Szucsánszki (3)	(Hungary) FTC-Rail Cargo Hungaria
2017	Máté Lékai	(Hungary) Telekom Veszprém	Anita Görbicz (6)	(Hungary) Győri Audi ETO KC
2018	Richárd Bodó	(Hungary) SC Pick Szeged	Anikó Kovacsics	(Hungary) FTC-Rail Cargo Hungaria
2019	Bence Bánhidi	(Hungary) SC Pick Szeged	Nadine Schatzl	(Hungary) FTC-Rail Cargo Hungaria
2020	Bence Bánhidi (2)	(Hungary) SC Pick Szeged	Blanka Bíró	(Hungary) FTC-Rail Cargo Hungaria
2021	Bence Bánhidi (3)	(Hungary) SC Pick Szeged	Gréta Márton	(Hungary) FTC-Rail Cargo Hungaria
2022	Miklós Rosta	(Hungary) SC Pick Szeged	Katrin Klujber	(Hungary) FTC-Rail Cargo Hungaria
2023	Miklós Rosta (2)	(Hungary) Pick Szeged (until 2022/23) (Romania) CS Dinamo București (from 2023/24)	Blanka Bíró (2)	(Hungary) FTC-Rail Cargo Hungaria
2024	Bence Imre	(Hungary) FTC-Green Collect (until 2023/24) (Germany) THW Kiel (from 2024/25)	Katrin Klujber (2)	(Hungary) FTC-Rail Cargo Hungaria
2025	Gergő Fazekas	(Poland) Wisła Płock	Petra Vámos	(France) Metz Handball

== See also ==
- Hungarian handball clubs in European competitions
