= Erzsébet Bognár =

Hungarian handball player (1942-2017)

Medal record

Representing Hungary

Women's handball

World Championship
Gold medal – first place	1965 West Germany	Team
Bronze medal – third place	1971 Netherlands	Team

Erzsébet Bognár (pronounced [ˈɛrʒeːbɛt ˈboɡnaːr]; 1942 in Budapest – July 25, 2017) was a Hungarian handball player and World champion.

A loyal player of Ferencvárosi TC, Bognár spent fifteen years with the club (1960–75), during which period she won 4 Hungarian Championships and two Hungarian Cups. Additionally, Ferencvárosi reached the final of the European Champions Cup in 1971, however they fell short to record champions HC Spartak Kyiv.

Bognár also played 113 times for the Hungarian national team and participated at two World Championships. In 1965 she was a member of the team that won the event in West Germany, while six years later she collected the bronze medal in the Netherlands.

== Achievements ==
=== Club ===
- Nemzeti Bajnokság I:
  - Winner: 1966, 1968, 1969, 1971
- Magyar Kupa:
  - Winner: 1967, 1970
- European Champions Cup:
  - Finalist: 1971

=== International ===
- World Championship:
  - Winner: 1965
  - Bronze Medalist: 1971

=== Individual ===
- Hungarian Handballer of the Year: 1966
