= Ágnes Babos =

Hungarian handball player (1944–2020)

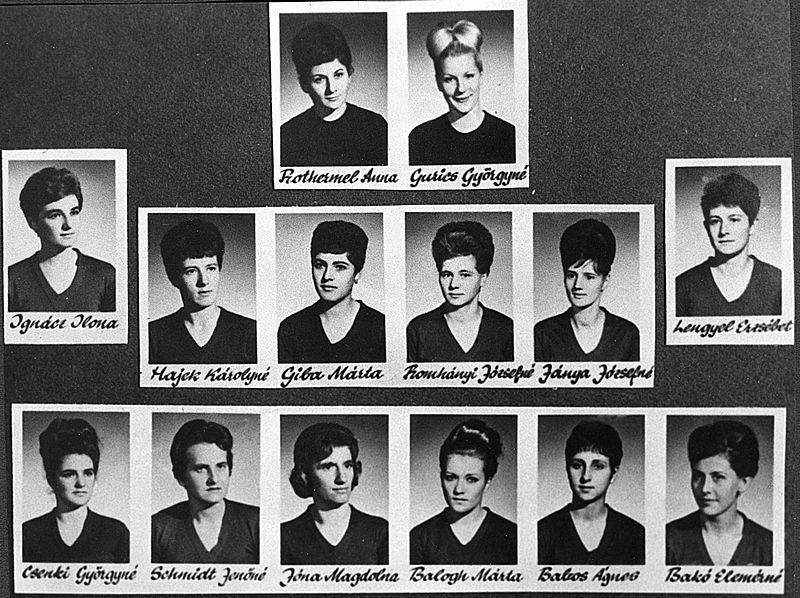

Personal information
- Full name: Ágnes Babos
- Nationality: Hungarian
- Born: 12 May 1944 Kecskemét, Hungary
- Died: 13 May 2020 (aged 76)

Sport
- Sport: Handball
- Position: Playmaker
- Current club: —

Senior clubs
- Years: Team
- 1962–1966: Testnevelési Főiskola SE
- 1966–1976: Vasas SC
- 1976–1978: Budapest Spartacus SC
National team
Years	Team	Apps	(Gls)
1964–1974	Hungary	121	(?)
Medal record
World Championship
Gold medal – first place	1965 West Germany	Team
Bronze medal – third place	1971 Netherlands	Team

Ágnes Babos (12 May 1944 – 13 May 2020) was a Hungarian handball player and World champion.

She was born in Kecskemét and died on 13 May 2020.

== Achievements ==
- Nemzeti Bajnokság I:
  - Winner: 1972, 1973, 1974, 1975
- Magyar Kupa:
  - Winner: 1965, 1969, 1971, 1974, 1976
- World Championship:
  - Winner: 1965
  - Bronze Medalist: 1971

== Awards ==
- Hungarian Handballer of the Year: 1970, 1972
