= Márta Giba =

Hungarian handball player (born 1943)

Medal record

Representing Hungary

Women's handball

World Championship
Gold medal – first place	1965 West Germany	Team
Bronze medal – third place	1971 Netherlands	Team
Bronze medal – third place	1973 Yugoslavia	Team

Márta Giba (Hungarian: [ˈmaːrtɒ ˈɡibɒ]; born 1943) is a former Hungarian handball player and World champion, who was voted the Hungarian Handballer of the Year in 1971.

A one-team player, Giba played for Ferencvárosi TC between 1962 and 1979, during which period she won three Hungarian championships and as many Hungarian cup titles. She also obtained EHF Cup Winners' Cup in 1978.

She played 68 times for the Hungarian national team; with them she triumphed at the 1965 World Championship and won the bronze medal of the 1971 and 1973 edition.

== Achievements ==
- Nemzeti Bajnokság I:
  - Winner: 1968, 1969, 1971
- Magyar Kupa:
  - Winner: 1967, 1970, 1977
- European Champions Cup:
  - Finalist: 1971
- Cup Winners' Cup:
  - Winner: 1978
  - Finalist: 1979
- World Championship:
  - Winner: 1965
  - Bronze Medalist: 1971, 1973

== Individual awards ==
- Hungarian Handballer of the Year: 1971
