= Márta Balogh =

Hungarian handball player (1943–2019)

Personal information
- Full name: Márta Balogh
- Nationality: Hungarian
- Born: 2 March 1943 Budapest, Kingdom of Hungary
- Died: 3 October 2019 (aged 76)

Sport
- Sport: Handball
- Position: Playmaker
- Current club: —

Senior clubs
- Years: Team
- 1961–1969: Budapesti Spartacus SC
National team
Years	Team	Apps	(Gls)
1962–1969	Hungary	42	(?)
Medal record
World Championship
Gold medal – first place	1965 West Germany	Team

Márta Balogh (Hungarian pronunciation: [ˈmaːrtɒ ˈbɒloɡ]; 2 March 1943 – 3 October 2019) was a Hungarian international handball player, multiple Hungarian champion and Hungarian cup winner, and gold medalist of the 1965 World Championship.

== Achievements ==
- Nemzeti Bajnokság I:
  - Winner: 1962, 1963, 1964, 1965, 1967
- Magyar Kupa:
  - Winner: 1963, 1968
- World Championship:
  - Winner: 1965

== Personal life ==
Balogh was born in Budapest. She was married to two-times Olympic champion water polo player Kálmán Markovits. They had one child, László, who became the youngest Hungarian champion in tennis in 1986 at the age of 16, and later had a successful career as a sports executive, being the chairman of Vasas SC and a member of Hungarian Olympic Committee.
