= Noémi Trufán =

Romanian-Hungarian handball player (born 1985)

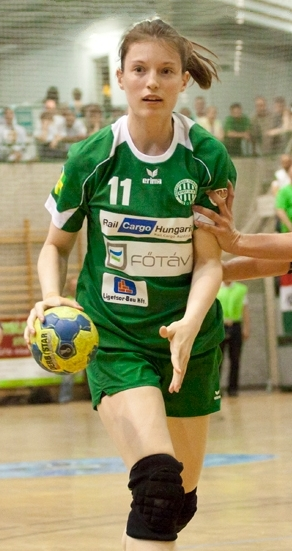
- Trufán in 2011

Personal information
- Full name: Noémi Trufán
- Nationality: Hungarian
- Born: 11 January 1985 (age 41) Târgu Mureș, Romania
- Height: 180 cm (71 in)

Sport
- Sport: Handball
- Position: Right back
- Current club: Retired

Youth career
- Years: Team
- 2001–2004: Dunaferr

Senior clubs
- Years: Team
- 2004–2005: Dunaferr
- loan: → Gyöngyösi FKK
- 2005–2007: Váci NKSE
- 2007–2008: Csömör KSK
- 2008–2009: Újbuda TC
- 2009–2011: Ferencvárosi TC

Noémi Trufán (born 11 January 1985 in Târgu Mureș) is a Romanian-born Hungarian handballer who most recently played for Ferencvárosi TC on professional level. After that she left FTC, first she played in Germany, then in Luxemburg.

== Achievements ==
- Nemzeti Bajnokság I:
  - Bronze Medallist: 2011
- Magyar Kupa:
  - Silver Medallist: 2010
- EHF Cup Winners' Cup:
  - Winner: 2011
