= Elek (surname) =

Elek is a surname. Notable people with the surname include:

- Ákos Elek (born 1988), Hungarian football player
- Attila Elek (born 1982), Hungarian ice dancer
- Ferenc Elek (born 1974), Hungarian actor
- Gábor Elek (born 1970), Hungarian handball player and coach
- György Elek (born 1984), Hungarian ice dancer
- Gyula Elek (1932–2012), Hungarian handball player
- Ilona Elek (1907–1988), Hungarian fencer
- Judit Elek (1937–2025), Hungarian film director and screenwriter
- Margit Elek (1910–1986), Hungarian foil fencer
- Paul Elek (1906–1976), British publisher
- Róbert Elek (born 1988), Romanian football player
- Zoltan Elek, makeup artist

== See also ==
- Elek (given name)
