= Nadine Szöllősi-Schatzl =

Hungarian handball player (born 1993)

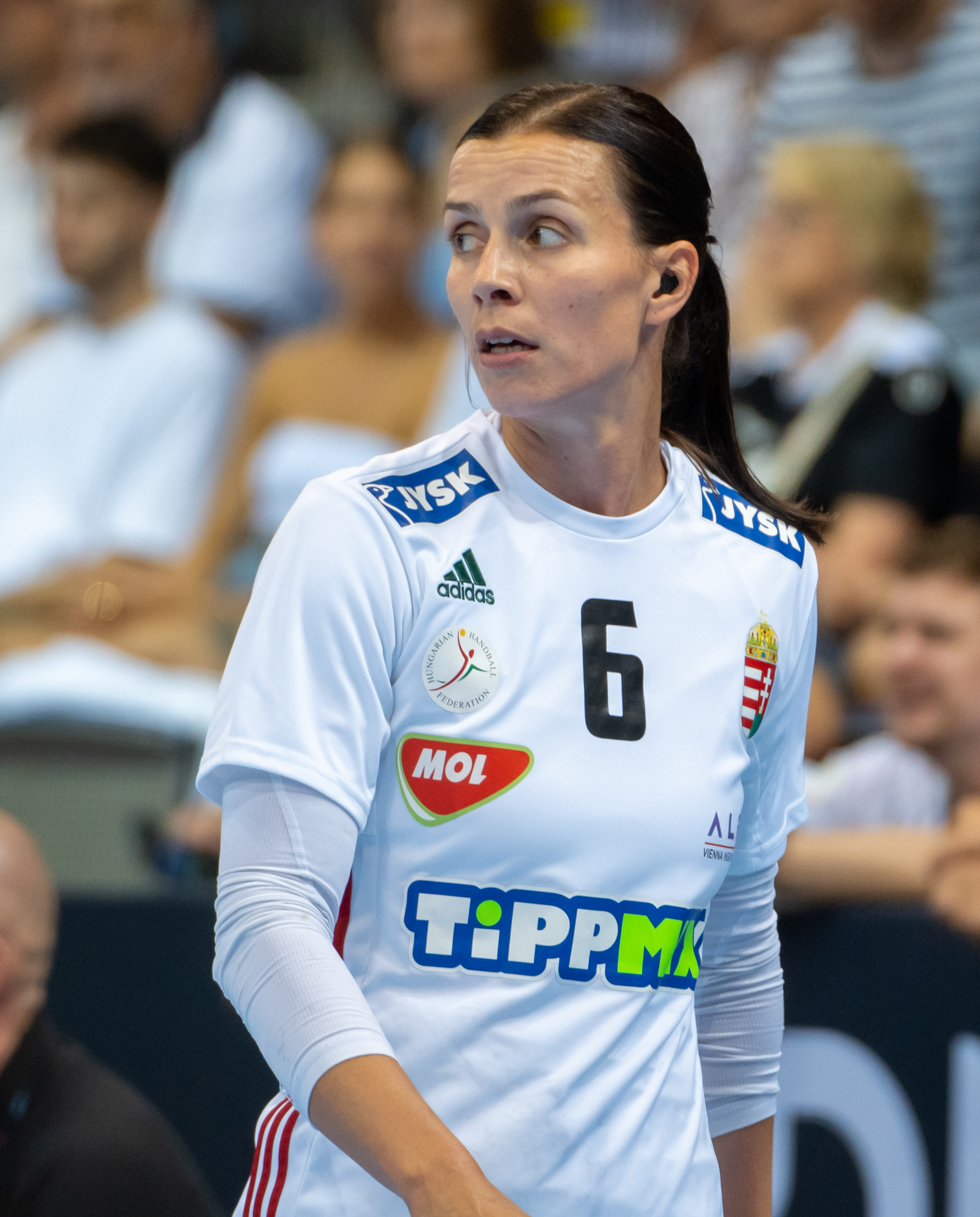

Personal information
- Nationality: German; Hungarian
- Born: 19 November 1993 (age 32) Munich, Germany
- Height: 1.74 m (5 ft 9 in)

Sport
- Sport: Handball
- Position: Left wing
- Current club: Budaörs Handball
- Number: 6

Senior clubs
- Years: Team
- 2010–2013: Győri ETO KC
- 2012–2013: → Veszprém BKC (loan)
- 2013–2015: Érd NK
- 2015–2021: Ferencvárosi TC
- 2021–2024: Győri ETO KC
- 2024–: Moyra-Budaörs Handball
- 2025: → Metz Handball (loan)
National team
Years	Team	Apps	(Gls)
2014–	Hungary	135	(330)
Medal record
European Championship
Bronze medal – third place	2024 Austria/Hungary/Switzerland

Nadine Szöllősi-Schatzl (born 19 November 1993) is a Hungarian professional handballer for Budaörs Handball and the Hungary national team.

She represented Hungary at four European Championship (2016, 2018, 2020, 2024), and three World Championship (2017, 2019, 2023) tournaments. She also participated in the Tokyo Summer Olympics in 2020 and the Paris Summer Olympics in 2024, where the team finished 7th and 6th respectively. At the 2024 European Championship she was part of the Hungarian team that won bronze medals, losing to Norway in semifinal and beating France in the third place play-off. This was the first Hungarian medals since 2012.

== Achievements ==
=== National team ===
- European Women's Handball Championship:
  - Bronze Medalist: 2024

=== Club ===
- Nemzeti Bajnokság I:
  - Winner: 2011, 2012, 2021, 2022, 2023
- Magyar Kupa:
  - Winner: 2011, 2012, 2017
  - Finalist: 2019, 2022, 2023, 2024
  - Third place: 2015, 2016, 2018, 2021, 2025
- EHF Champions League:
  - Winner: 2024
  - Finalist: 2012, 2022

== Individual awards ==
- Hungarian Handballer of the Year: 2019
- Møbelringen Cup 2017: All-Star Left Wing

== Personal life ==
Szöllősi-Schatzl was born in Munich, Germany to Hungarian parents. Her parents moved to Germany in the late 1980s and then moved back to Hungary when Nadine was 10 years old. Her paternal grandfather is Swabian. Her younger sister, Natalie is also a handball player.

In the summer 2023 she got married with her partner Ádám Szöllősi.

She speaks Hungarian and German fluently, furthermore due to her birthplace she also has German nationality.
