= Elek (given name) =

Elek is a given name. Notable people with the given name include:

- Elek Bacsik (1926–1993), Hungarian-born American jazz guitarist and violinist
- Elek Imredy (1912–1994), Hungarian sculptor
- Elek Köblös (1887–1938), Hungarian and Romanian political leader
- Elek Nyilas (born 1969), Hungarian football player
- Elek Schwartz (1908–2000), Romanian football player
- Elek Straub (born 1944), Hungarian engineer, consultant, investor, philanthropist and businessman

== See also ==
- Elek (surname)
