= Gyula Elek =

Hungarian handball player and coach (1932-2012)

Gyula Elek (20 February 1932 – 23 May 2012 ) was a Hungarian handball player, coach and an iconic figure of Ferencvárosi TC.

During his 16-year-long playing career between 1949 and 1965, Elek played for Taurus SC, Elektromos SE and Ferencvárosi TC. Shortly after his retirement he was contacted by Ferencváros to take the head coaching position of the women's handball club, which he accepted and began the work in early 1966. He also brought to the club Anna Rothermel, the goalkeeper of the 1965 World champion Hungarian team, to whom he later married.

Elek spent 21 years on the bench of Ferencváros with a shorter interruption (1966–85, 1990–92), during which period the team achieved several outstanding results, winning four Hungarian championships and as many Hungarian cup titles. On continental level Ferencváros won the EHF Women's Cup Winners' Cup in 1978 after beating SC Leipzig 18 to 17 in the final. In the following year they reached the final of the tournament again, however, this time they were defeated by TSC Berlin. In 1971 the team played in the final of the European Champions Cup as well, where they were beaten by Spartak Kiev, the dominant team of the era.

After quitting the coaching position in 1992, Elek became the director of the Ferencvárosi TC handball department, a position he held until his retirement. Elek and his wife, Anna Rothermel had one son, Gábor, who followed his father's path and became the head coach of Ferencváros in 2008. Gábor also had a number of successes, most notably winning the EHF Cup Winners' Cup in 2011 and 2012.

Gyula Elek died after a short hospital treatment on 23 May 2012. He was 80.

== Achievements ==
- Nemzeti Bajnokság I:
  - Winner: 1966, 1968, 1969, 1971
- Magyar Kupa:
  - Winner: 1967, 1968, 1970, 1972
- European Champions Cup:
  - Finalist: 1971
- EHF Cup Winners' Cup:
  - Winner: 1978
  - Finalist: 1979
