= Blanka Böde-Bíró =

Hungarian handball player (born 1994)

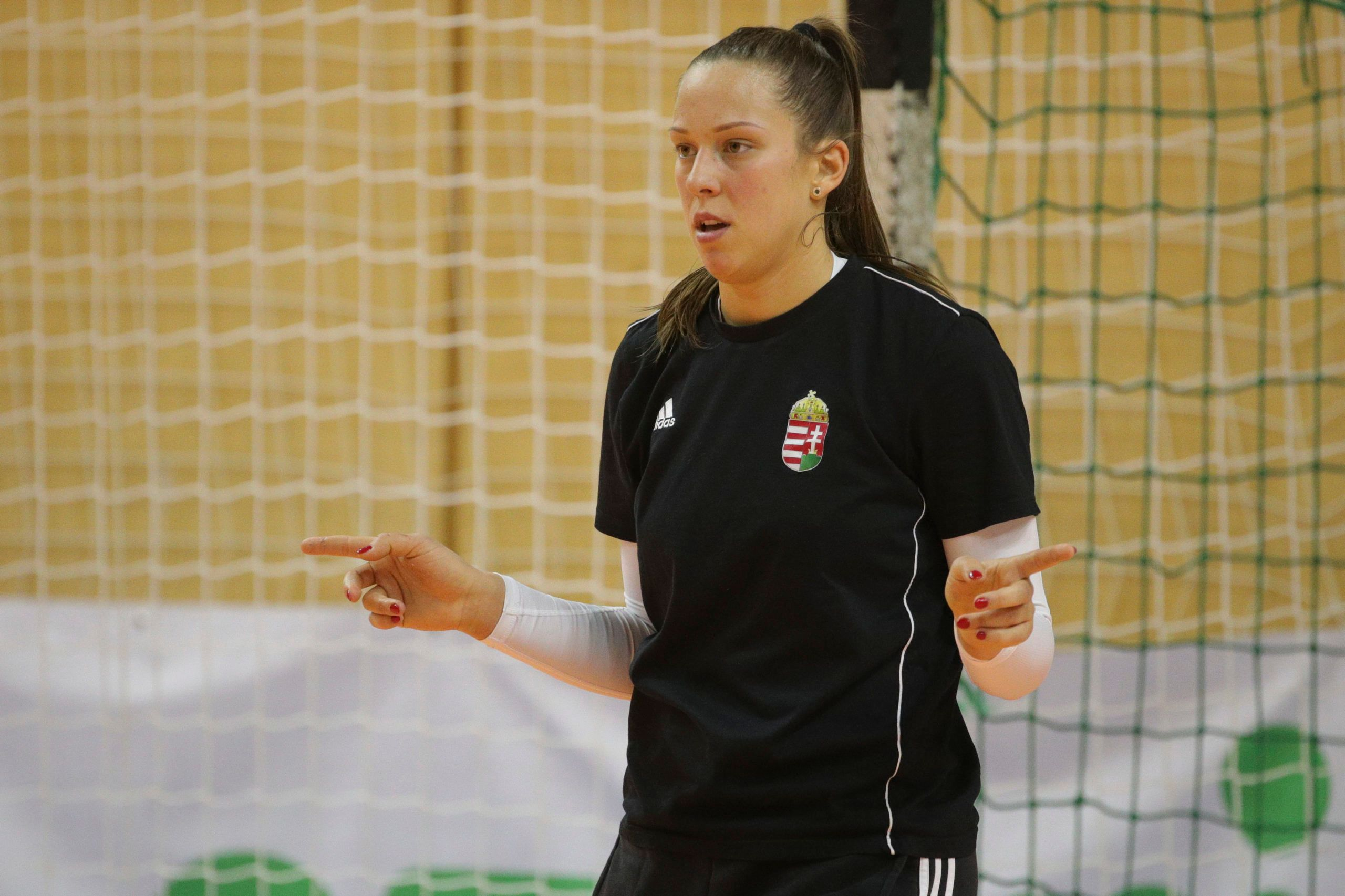

Personal information
- Full name: Blanka Böde-Bíró
- Nationality: Hungarian
- Born: 22 September 1994 (age 32) Vác, Hungary
- Height: 1.87 m (6 ft 2 in)

Sport
- Sport: Handball
- Position: Goalkeeper
- Current club: Ferencvárosi TC
- Number: 16

Senior clubs
- Years: Team
- 2010–2016: Váci NKSE
- 2016–: Ferencvárosi TC
National team
Years	Team	Apps	(Gls)
2014–	Hungary	133	(3)
Medal record
European Championship
Bronze medal – third place	2024 Austria/Hungary/Switzerland
Junior European Championship
Silver medal – second place	2013 Denmark

Blanka Böde-Bíró (Hungarian: [ˈblɒŋkɒ ˈbiːroː]; born 22 September 1994) is a Hungarian handball goalkeeper for Ferencvárosi TC and the Hungarian national team.

== Career ==
Böde-Bíró made her senior debut at Váci NKSE, where she had come through the youth ranks. In 2016 she joined Ferencvárosi TC. In 2023 she reached the final of the 2022–23 Women's EHF Champions League where they lost to Norwegian Vipers Kristiansand.

At the 2024 European Championship she was part of the Hungarian team that won bronze medals, losing to Norway in the semifinal and beating France in the third-place play-off. This was the women's national team's first medal since 2012.

== Achievements ==
- Nemzeti Bajnokság I:
  - Gold: 2021
  - Silver: 2017, 2018, 2019, 2022, 2023
- Magyar Kupa:
  - Gold: 2017, 2022, 2023, 2024, 2025
  - Silver: 2019
  - Bronze: 2018, 2021
- EHF Champions League:
  - Silver: 2023

== Awards and recognition ==
- Hungarian Handballer of the Year: 2020, 2023
- Handball-Planet.com World Young Female All-Star Team: 2015–16
- Best Young Player of the EHF Champions League: 2017

== Personal life ==
In June 2023 she married Hungarian former international footballer Dániel Böde. Their son, Dávid István was born in July 2025.

Olympic Games
Preceded by László Cseh; Aida Mohamed	Flagbearer for Hungary (with Krisztián Tóth); Paris 2024	Succeeded by Incumbent
