= Danick Snelder =

Dutch handball player (born 1990)

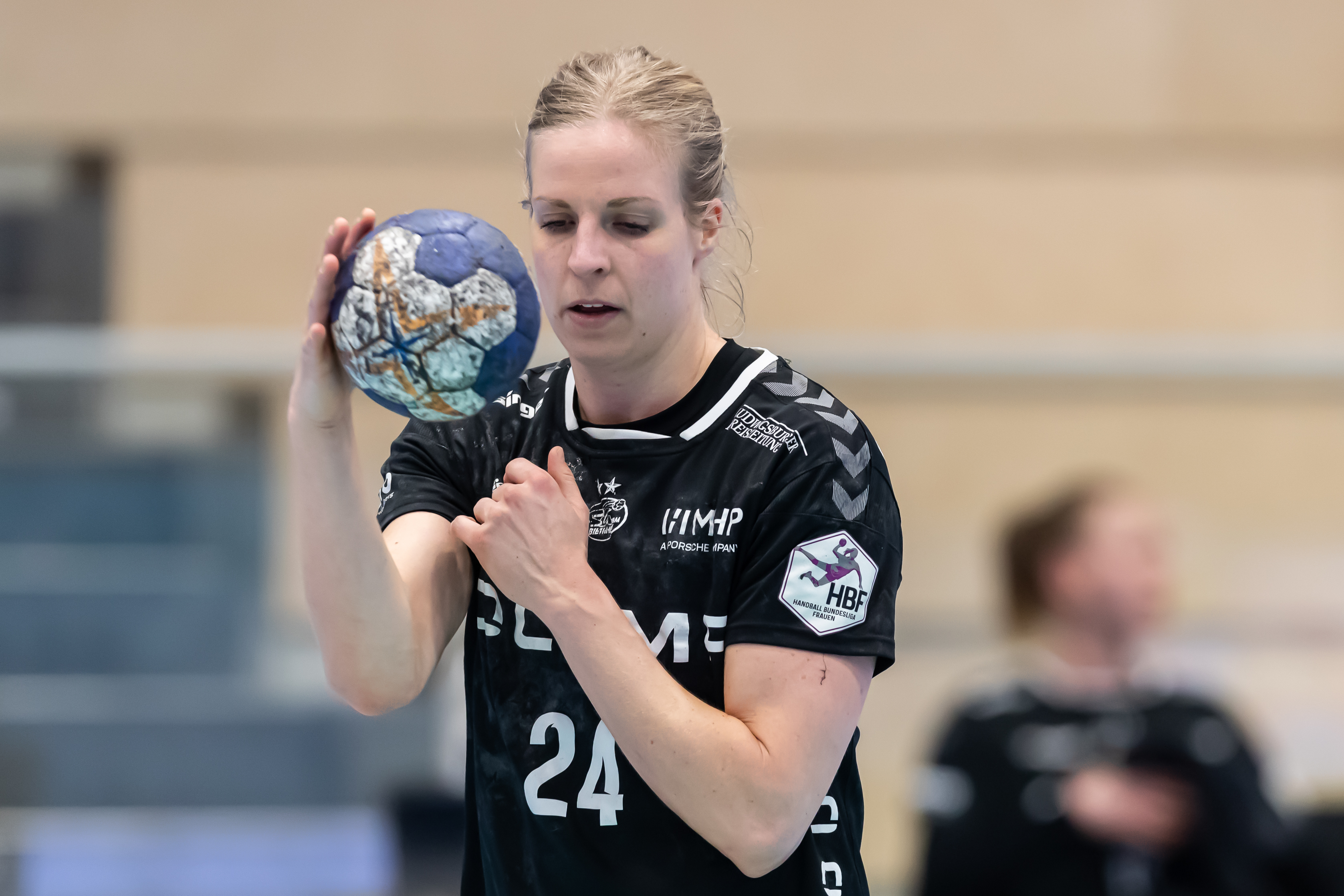

Personal information
- Full name: Danick Albertine Snelder
- Nationality: Dutch
- Born: 22 May 1990 (age 36) Pijnacker, Netherlands
- Height: 1.78 m (5 ft 10 in)

Sport
- Sport: Handball
- Position: Pivot
- Current club: SG BBM Bietigheim
- Number: 24

Youth career
- Years: Team
- 1995-2005: Oliveo Pijnacker

Senior clubs
- Years: Team
- 2005–2010: HV Hellas Den Haag
- 2010–2016: Thüringer HC
- 2016–2020: Ferencvárosi TC
- 2020: Siófok KC
- 2020–2024: SG BBM Bietigheim
National team
Years	Team	Apps	(Gls)
2009-	Netherlands	207	(520)
Medal record
World Championship
Gold medal – first place	2019 Japan
Silver medal – second place	2015 Denmark
Bronze medal – third place	2017 Germany
European Championship
Silver medal – second place	2016 Sweden
- Updated on 17 July 2024

Danick Albertine Snelder (born 22 May 1990) is a Dutch handball player for SG BBM Bietigheim and the Dutch national team.

She was a part the Netherlands team that won the 2019 World Women's Handball Championship; the first title in the country's history.

== Career ==
From 1995 to 2005 Snelder played for Oliveo Pijnacker, where she joined Omni SV Hellas Den Haag. In 2010 she joined German side Thüringer HC where she won the Bundesliga 6 times in a row from 2010–11 to 2015–16. In this period she also won the DHB-Pokal in 2011 and 2013.

In 2016 she joined Hungarian Ferencvárosi TC. Here she won the 2017 Hungarian cup. In 2020 she joined league rivals Siófok KC, but already in October 2020 she left the club to return to Germany. Here she joined SG BBM Bietigheim. Here she won the 2021 and 2022 DHB-Pokal, the 2021 DHB-Supercup, the 2022 German championship and the 2022 EHF European League.

In 2022 she was out for a while with cartilage damage in her knee. The club replaced her with Annika Meyer in the meantime. In 2024 she left the club.

=== National team ===
Snelder debuted for the Dutch national team on 7 March 2009, against Spain. Her first major international tournament was the 2010 European Championship in Denmark/Norway.

She participated at the 2011 World Championship in Brazil and the 2013 World Championship in Serbia. She competed at the 2016 Summer Olympics, where the Dutch team placed fourth.

At the 2016 European Championship she won silver medals, and she won bronze medals at the 2017 World Championship.

In 2019 she won a World Championship gold medal, beating Spain in the final 30:29.

She also represented Netherlands at the 2020 Olympics in Tokyo.

== Achievements ==
- EHF European League:
  - Winner: 2022
- Bundesliga:
  - Winner: 2011, 2012, 2013, 2014, 2015, 2016, 2022, 2023
- DHB-Pokal:
  - Winner: 2011, 2013
- Hungarian Cup:
  - Winner: 2017
