= UKSE Szekszárd =

- Full name: Utánpótlás Kézilabda Sport Egyesület Szekszárd
- Short name: UKSE
- Founded: 1995
- Arena: Városi Sportközpont, Szekszárd
- Capacity: 1,200
- President: Jenő Varga
- Head coach: Jenő Kovács
- League: Nemzeti Bajnokság I/B
- 2010–11: Nemzeti Bajnokság I, 11th (relegated)
- Club colours

Utánpótlás Kézilabda Sport Egyesület Szekszárd is a Hungarian women's handball team from Szekszárd.

== History ==
The club was created in 1995 with about 40 players. During the early years the club grew quickly, and for today more than 150 players in ten groups of age are trained by twenty coaches. Most of the players are between the age of 8 and 18, as the main pillar of the team is the youth development and promotion of home-grown players. For their work with juveniles, UKSE were awarded the "A Magyar Kézilabdázásért" ("For the Hungarian Handball") prize in 2006.

Their biggest success so far is the third place in the Nemzeti Bajnokság I/B, they achieved in 2010. This result unexpectedly became more valuable later, as Hódmezővásárhelyi NKC were unable to meet the financial criteria to enter the 2010–11 Nemzeti Bajnokság I, and UKSE, with the best balance between the non-promoted teams, got the chance to take their place in the top-level championship.

== Results ==
- Nemzeti Bajnokság I/B
  - Bronze: 2010

== Notable former players ==
- (Hungary) Ágnes Triffa
- (Hungary) Luca Szekerczés
- (Hungary) Edit Csendes
- (Hungary) Margit Pádár
- (Hungary) Anett Köbli
- (Hungary) Katalin Jenőfi
- (Hungary) Rita Borbás
- (Hungary) Edina Burai
- (Hungary) Krisztina Gulya
- (Hungary) Edina Vasas
- (Hungary) Barbara Kopecz
- (Hungary) Éva Fauszt
- (Hungary) Annamária Kurucz
- (Hungary) Katalin Böcking
- (Hungary) Andrea Jánics
- (Hungary) Márta Müller
- (Hungary) Nagy Henrietta
- (Hungary) Erika Oravecz
- (Hungary) Kitti Mátyás
- (Hungary) Éva Csáki
- (Slovakia) Renata Jancarová
- (Serbia) Sandra Kuridza
- (Serbia) Ninoslava Popov
- (Serbia) Jasmina Petrovic
- (Romania) Luminita Bosna
- (Ukraine) Irina Uvarovska

== See also ==
- 2011–12 Nemzeti Bajnokság I (women's handball)
