= Đurđina Malović =

Montenegrin handball player (born 1996)

Personal information
- Nationality: Montenegrin
- Born: 5 May 1996 (age 30) Nikšić, Montenegro, FR Yugoslavia
- Height: 1.82 m (6 ft 0 in)

Sport
- Sport: Handball
- Position: Right back
- Current club: Toulon MV HB
- Number: 26

Senior clubs
- Years: Team
- 2013–2015: ŽRK Danilovgrad
- 2015–2018: ŽRK Budućnost Podgorica
- 2018–2019: Ferencvárosi TC
- 2019–2020: MTK Budapest
- 2020–2021: MKS Lublin
- 2021–: Toulon Métropole Var Handball
National team
Years	Team	Apps	(Gls)
2013–	Montenegro	52	(69)
Medal record
European Championship
Bronze medal – third place	2022 Slovenia/North Macedonia/Montenegro

Đurđina Malović (born 5 May 1996) is a Montenegrin handball player for Toulon MVH and the Montenegrin national team.

She represented Montenegro at the 2013 World Women's Handball Championship in Serbia and the 2014 European Women's Handball Championship in Hungary and Croatia.
