= 1965 World Women's Handball Championship =

1965 edition of the World Women's Handball Championship

Tournament details
- Host country: West Germany
- Dates: November 7 – November 13
- Teams: 8

Final positions
- Champions: Hungary (1st title)
- Runners-up: Yugoslavia
- Third place: West Germany

Tournament statistics
- Matches played: 16
- Goals scored: 247 (15.44 per match)
- Top scorer: Anne-Marie Nielsen (11 goals)

The 1965 World Women's Handball Championship was the third edition of the tournament. It took place in West Germany in 1965.

== Preliminary round ==
Team will compete for Places 1-2
Team will compete for Places 3-4

=== Group A ===
Team	Pld	W	D	L	GF	GA	GD	Pts
Yugoslavia	3	3	0	0	28	15	+13	6
West Germany	3	2	0	1	26	20	+6	4
Denmark	3	1	0	2	21	27	−6	2
Japan	3	0	0	3	21	34	−13	0

Source: IHF

1965	Yugoslavia	11–6	Denmark	West Germany

1965	West Germany	15–7	Japan	West Germany

1965	Denmark	10–9	Japan	West Germany

1965	Yugoslavia	8–4	West Germany	West Germany

1965	West Germany	7–5	Denmark	West Germany

1965	Yugoslavia	9–5	Japan	West Germany

=== Group B ===
Team	Pld	W	D	L	GF	GA	GD	Pts
Hungary	3	3	0	0	31	15	+16	6
Czechoslovakia	3	1	1	1	27	22	+5	3
Romania	3	0	2	1	18	21	−3	2
Poland	3	0	1	2	16	34	−18	1

Source: IHF

1965	Romania	4–4	Poland	West Germany

1965	Hungary	7–4	Czechoslovakia	West Germany

1965	Hungary	9–6	Romania	West Germany

1965	Czechoslovakia	15–7	Poland	West Germany

1965	Romania	8–8	Czechoslovakia	West Germany

1965	Hungary	15–5	Poland	West Germany

== Placement Matches ==
=== Seventh Place Playoff ===
13.11.1965	Japan	6–5	Poland	West Germany

=== Fifth Place Playoff ===
13.11.1965	Denmark	10–9	Romania	West Germany

=== Third Place Playoff ===
13.11.1965	West Germany	11–10	Czechoslovakia	West Germany

=== Final ===
13.11.1965	Hungary	5–3	Yugoslavia	West Germany

== Final standings ==
Rank	Team
Gold medal	Hungary
Silver medal	Yugoslavia
Bronze medal	West Germany
4	Czechoslovakia
5	Denmark
6	Romania
7	Japan
8	Poland

1965 Women's World Champions

Hungary
First Title

Team Roster

Györgyné Gurics, Ágnes Babos, Erzsébet Bognár, Györgyné Csenki, Magdolna Jóna, Ágnes Hanus, Erzsébet Lengyel, Jenőné Schmidt, Anna Rothermel, Márta Balogh, Károlyné Hajek, Márta Giba, Ilona Ignácz and Józsefne Romhányi.
Trainer: Bódog Török

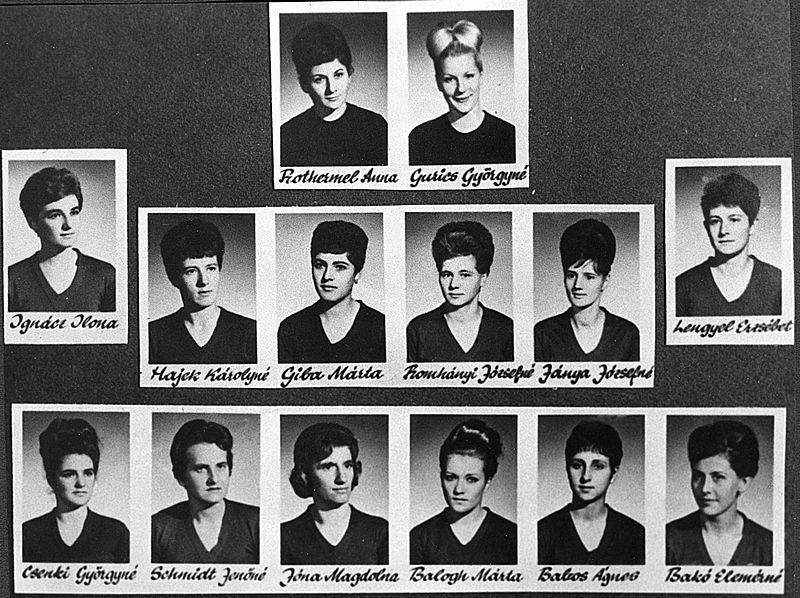
1965 - Women's Handball World Champions

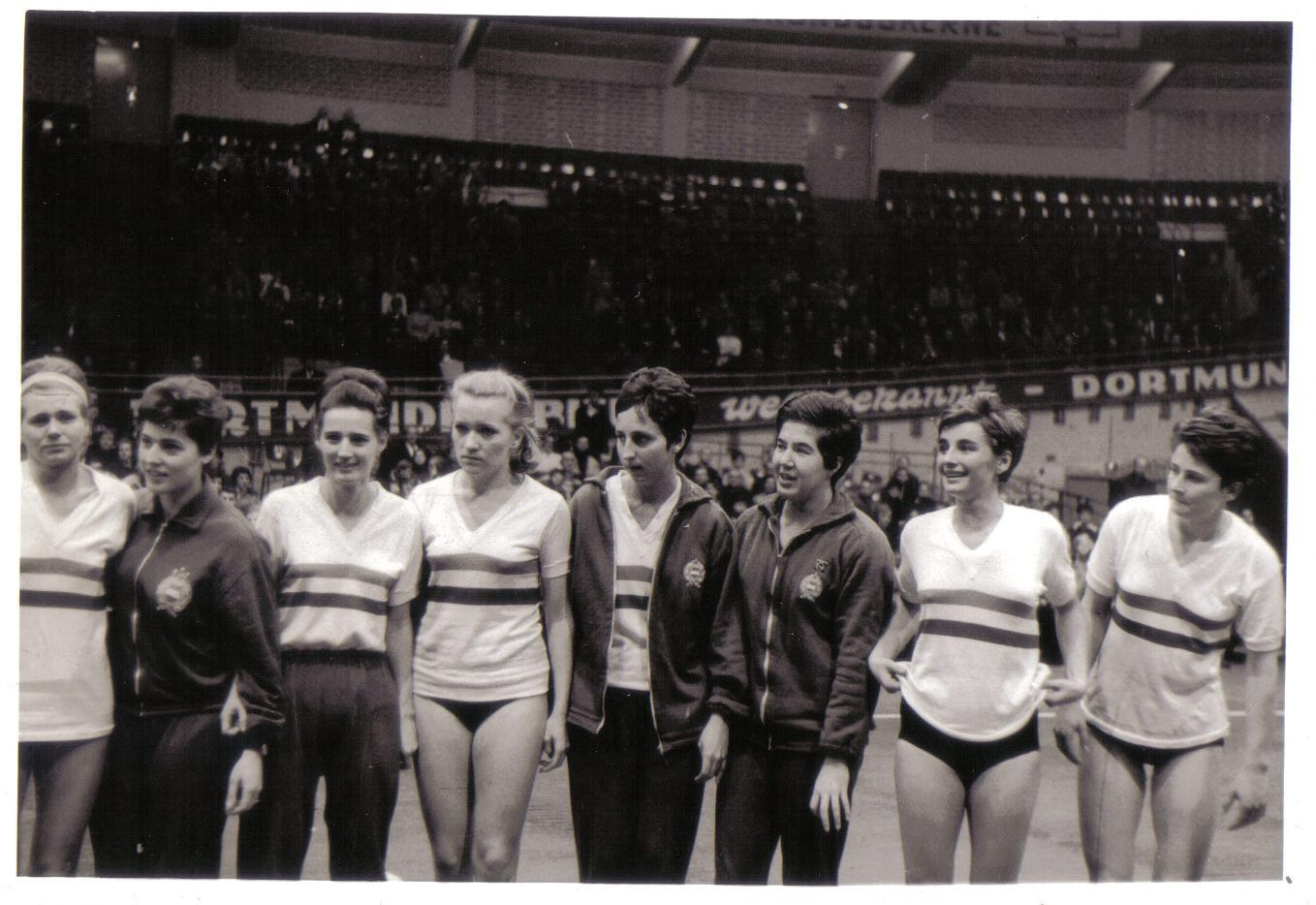
1965 - Women's Handball World Champions

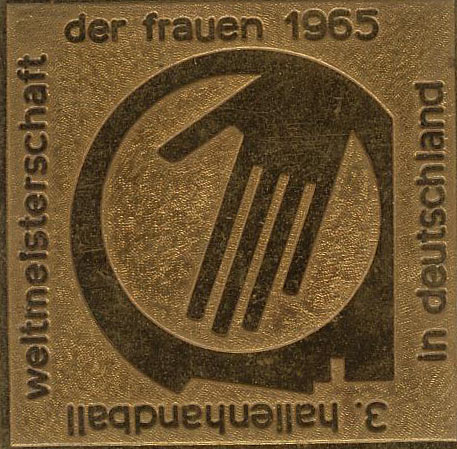
1965 - Women's Handball World Champions Gold medal
