= Zita Szucsánszki =

Hungarian handball player (born 1987)

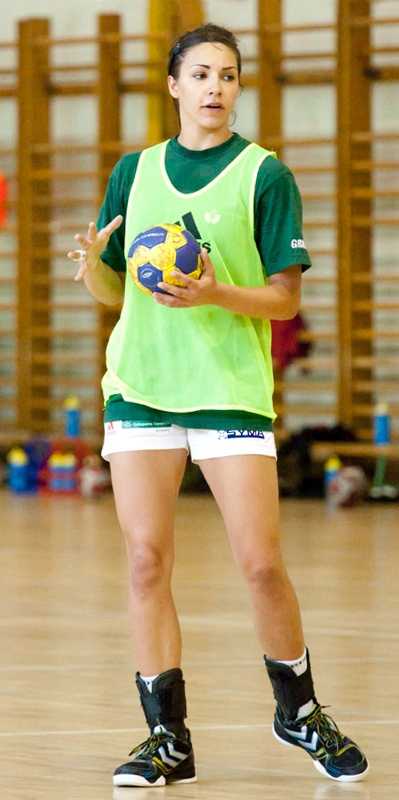

Personal information
- Nationality: Hungarian
- Born: 22 May 1987 (age 39) Budapest, Hungary
- Height: 1.72 m (5 ft 8 in)

Sport
- Sport: Handball
- Position: Centre back
- Current club: MOL Esztergom
- Number: 87

Youth career
- Years: Team
- 2000–2002: Postás SE

Senior clubs
- Years: Team
- 2002–2005: Budapesti Spartacus SC
- 2005–2023: Ferencvárosi TC
- 2023–2026: MOL Esztergom
National team
Years	Team	Apps	(Gls)
2006–2021	Hungary	147	(420)
Medal record
European Championship
Bronze medal – third place	2012 Serbia

Zita Szucsánszki (born 22 May 1987) is a former Hungarian handball player for MOL Esztergom and the Hungarian national team.

She made her international debut on 4 November 2006 against Slovakia, and represented Hungary in the 2020 Summer Olympics, five World Championships (2007, 2009, 2013, 2015, 2017) and four European Championships (2008, 2010, 2012, 2014).

In recognition of her performances and achievements throughout the year, she was voted the Hungarian Handballer of the Year in 2011, in 2015 and in 2016.

== Achievements ==
- Nemzeti Bajnokság I:
  - Winner: 2007, 2015, 2021
  - Silver Medalist: 2006, 2009, 2012, 2013, 2014, 2016, 2017, 2018, 2019
  - Bronze Medalist: 2008, 2011
- Magyar Kupa:
  - Winner: 2017, 2022, 2023
  - Silver Medalist: 2007, 2010, 2013, 2014, 2015
  - Bronze Medalist: 2006, 2016, 2018, 2021
- EHF Cup:
  - Winner: 2006
- EHF Cup Winners' Cup:
  - Winner: 2011, 2012
  - Semifinalist: 2007
- EHF Champions Trophy:
  - Fourth Placed: 2006
- European Championship:
  - Bronze Medalist: 2012

== Individual awards ==
- Hungarian Handballer of the Year: 2011, 2015, 2016

== Personal life ==
She is married to handball coach, Gábor Elek. Their son, Levente was born in June 2019.
