= Ferencvárosi TC (women's handball) =

Hungarian handball club

FTC-Toyota Kovács
- Full name: Ferencvárosi Torna Club
- Nickname: Fradi
- Short name: FTC
- Founded: 1950; 76 years ago
- Arena: Elek Gyula Aréna, Budapest; Érd Aréna, Érd
- Capacity: 1,300; 2,200
- President: Zsolt Ákos Jeney
- Head coach: Jesper Jensen
- League: Nemzeti Bajnokság I
- 2024–25: Nemzeti Bajnokság I, 2nd
- Club colours
Home	Away

Ferencvárosi Torna Club is a Hungarian professional women's handball team from Budapest, that is part of the multi-sports club Ferencvárosi TC. Nicknamed Fradi, the team plays in the Nemzeti Bajnokság I, the top level championship in Hungary. They are one of the most successful clubs in the country, having won eleven Hungarian championships and as many Hungarian cup titles. FTC also enjoy a good reputation in continental competitions: they lifted the EHF Cup Winners' Cup trophy in 1978, 2011, and 2012, and they were also crowned as the EHF Cup winners in 2006. The team also reached the finals of the EHF Champions League three times, however, they fell short in all occasions.

The current name of the club is FTC-Toyota Kovács due to sponsorship reasons.

== The First Great Generation ==
After the cessation of large-field games in the early 1960s, Ferencváros, which regained its name in the autumn of 1956, focused on small-field handball. Continuous improvement (finishing 9th in 1960, 7th in 1961, 4th in 1962, and 2nd in 1963) made the championship title a feasible goal. Nevertheless, there was a slight decline: the team finished 6th in 1964 and 5th in 1965. In 1966, they won their first championship gold. The team members included Éva Czitkovics, Márta Giba, Erzsébet Huszár, Erzsébet Jányáné Bognár, Ida Nagy, Teréz Nagy, Júlia Pencz, Anna Rothermel, Ilona Ruff, Judit Stern, Ida Szegedi, Gizella Szilágyi, Gáborné Zubor, and Zsuzsa Zsidai, with Gyula Elek as their coach.

In his first year as coach, Gyula Elek won the championship, which was followed by more championship titles and podium finishes. From 1966 to 1980, the team finished on the podium every year. They were champions four times (1966, 1968, 1969, 1971), runners-up seven times (1967, 1970, 1972, 1973, 1976, 1977, 1978), and third place four times (1974, 1975, 1979, 1980). During this period, the team won the cup four times (1967, 1970, 1972, 1977).

A standout figure of the team was goalkeeper Anna Rothermel Elekné, who was considered the best goalkeeper of her time both domestically and internationally. Thanks to her, Ferencváros conceded the fewest goals in the championships, even when they did not finish in first place.

Among the greats of the era were Márta Giba Takácsné, Erzsébet Bognár Szőkéné, and Magdolna Csiha, who played key roles as prolific scorers. Amália Sterbinszky, who became one of the best Hungarian handball players of the 20th century and played 250 matches for the national team, also started her senior career at Ferencváros.

== The 1980s ==
The successful series starting with the first championship gold was followed by a decline in the 1980s. The team finished in the middle ranks or lower. The only exception was the 1987 championship when Fradi finished in third place. In this decade, the Hungarian People's Republic Cup brought a silver medal for the team (1985).

== Successes of the 1990s ==
The foundations of the second golden era were laid by András Németh. Under his leadership, the team achieved its first result in the 1992/93 season, a silver medal. This was followed by gold a year later, so after 23 years, in 1993–94, Ferencváros won the championship again. The champion team of that time included Mária Bregócs, Andrea Farkas, Ágnes Farkas, Adrienne Fiedler, Erika Fiedler, Klára Kertész, Erzsébet Kókai, Beatrix Kökény, Mária Krammer, Gyöngyi Kulcsár, Dóra Lőwy, Rita Menyhárt, Mária Olasz, Beáta Őze, Ildikó Pádár, Margit Pádár, Éva Szarka, Gabriella Takács, Beatrix Tóth, and Hajnalka Vavrik.

The Fradi girls also won the next three championships. The 1994/1995 season was completed with a 100% performance: 30 matches, 30 victories. This successful era lasted for 16 years, with the team finishing first seven times, second four times, and third five times. Cup successes also followed: they won the cup again in 1993, and then in 1994, 1995, 1996, 1997, 2001, and 2003. They also achieved two second places (1998, 1999).

The master of this second golden era was András Németh, from whom legendary players emerged, such as goalkeepers Andrea Farkas and Tímea Sugár, and field players Beatrix Kökény, Ágnes Farkas, Ildikó Pádár, Eszter Siti, Erika Kirsner, Éva Szarka, Beatrix Tóth, Tímea Tóth, and Gabriella Takács.

Between 2007 and 2008, Gyula Zsiga led the team, achieving a bronze medal (2007/2008).

== New Era ==
From 2008, the team was taken over by Gábor Elek, son of former successful coach Gyula Elek. The rejuvenated team's first success was a silver medal in the 2008/2009 season and a cup silver in 2010. Another podium finish followed in the league, with Ferencváros finishing third in the 2010/2011 season. In the 2014/2015 season, the team reached the Hungarian Cup final and won the Hungarian championship by defeating the Győri Audi ETO KC team twice in the playoffs under Gábor Elek's leadership.

Before the start of the 2016/2017 season, Anikó Kovacsics, who left Győri ETO, national team goalkeeper Blanka Bíró, and World Championship silver medalist Dutch player Danick Snelder joined the team. In the Hungarian Cup final in Kecskemét on 2 April 2017, they defeated Győri ETO in a shootout and celebrated cup victory again after fourteen years.

In the 2018/2019 season, the squad included several national team players: Blanka Bíró, Dorottya Faluvégi, Noémi Háfra, Dóra Horváth, Kinga Klivinyi, Katrin Klujber, Anikó Kovacsics, Viktória Lukács, Rea Mészáros, and Nadine Schatzl strengthened the Hungarian women's handball team at this time. The Dutch national team player Danick Snelder, the Spanish national team's key player Nerea Pena, and Montenegrin national team members Bobana Klikovac and Djurdjina Malović were also part of the team.

In the season, Ferencváros finished second in both the Hungarian Cup and the championship and was eliminated in the quarterfinals of the Champions League against the Russian Rostov-Don team.

Before the 2020–2021 season, Faluvégi moved to Győr, and Pena was no longer part of the team, but four foreign players who later performed significantly, Emily Bölk, Alicia Stolle, Julia Behnke, and Angela Malestein, joined the team. In the Champions League, the Montenegrin Buducnost Podgorica was the final stop for the team in the round of 16, and they did not reach the final in the Hungarian Cup either. However, in the league, Ferencváros celebrated a championship victory again after six years, the 13th in its history.

In the following two seasons, the team led by Gábor Elek celebrated Hungarian Cup victories. Before the 2022–2023 season, it had been twenty-nine years since the green-white team won the domestic cup series in two consecutive years.

On 7 May 2023, the team reached the Final Four of the Champions League for the first time in its history after defeating the French Metz Handball team 33–26 away, winning 59–58 overall. After the match, it was officially announced that Gábor Elek would leave the team at the end of the season after fifteen seasons. In the Final Four of the Champions League, they first defeated the Danish Team Esbjerg by one goal in a tough match, but in the final, they were defeated by the twice-defending champion Norwegian Vipers Kristiansand, featuring Anna Vjahirjeva, Katrine Lunde, and Markéta Jeřábková, with a score of 28–24.

== International Successes ==
- Ferencváros achieved its first major international result in the 1970/71 season when it reached the final of the European Champions Cup. They lost to the Spartak Kiev, which was equal to the then world-leading Soviet team, 11–9 in a close match, thus becoming silver medalists.
- In the Cup Winners' Cup, however, Ferencváros succeeded: they won the series in the 1977/1978 season. In the final, they defeated the East German team SC Leipzig 18–17 in the Kör Hall. The team also reached the Cup Winners' Cup final in the following year, 1978/1979, but the East German team TSC Berlin celebrated with a 20–15 result.
- The team added another Cup Winners' Cup silver in 1994 when Walle Bremen proved to be better with a 45–44 aggregate score (23–21 at home, 24–21 away). In the 1995/1996 season, Ferencváros reached the semi-finals in the Champions League and repeated this performance in the following season.
- In 2001, the team played in the Champions League semi-finals again.
- In 2002, they almost achieved a miracle against Macedonian Kometal Skopje: after a home victory (27–25), the away match ended 22–26, so Ferencváros finished with a 51–49 aggregate score, earning a silver medal.
- In the 2004–2005 season, the team reached the top four in the EHF Cup.
- A year later, they surpassed their performance and won the EHF Cup in the 2005/2006 season. Ferencváros' opponent was the Croatian Podravka from Koprivnica, which they defeated with a 70–68 aggregate score (37–36 and 33–32).
- In the 2006/2007 season, the team competed in the Cup Winners' Cup again and reached the semi-finals.
- In the 2010/2011 season of the Cup Winners' Cup, Ferencváros finished first again, defeating strong opponents like Viborg HK and Metz Handball. In the final, Gábor Elek's students defeated the Spanish team C.B. Mar Alicante with a 57:52 aggregate score (34–29 at home, 23–23 away).
- In the 2011/2012 edition, the girls proved to be unbeatable again, winning the Cup Winners' Cup in 2012 by defeating the Danish star team Viborg both home and away. With this, Gábor Elek not only repeated his father's feat of leading the team to two consecutive KEK finals but surpassed it by winning both finals.
- FTC-Toyota Kovács reached the top eight teams in the Champions League in 2016, 2017, 2018, 2019, and 2024, and in the 2022–2023 season, they made it to the Final Four of the competition for the first time in history.

== Crest, colours, supporters ==
=== Kit manufacturers and shirt sponsor ===
The following table shows in detail Ferencvárosi TC kit manufacturers and shirt sponsors by year:

Period	Kit manufacturer	Shirt sponsor
2004–2005	adidas	T-Mobile
2005	adidas	Retz Bútor
2006	adidas	Retz Bútor / Budapest Bank
2006–2009	adidas	Budapest Bank
2009–2010	adidas	–
2010	Erima	FŐTÁV Zrt. / Jógazdabank
2011	Erima	Rail Cargo Hungaria / FŐTÁV Zrt.
2011–2013	Erima	Rail Cargo Hungaria
2013–2014	Nike	Rail Cargo Hungaria / Aegon
2014–	Nike	Rail Cargo Hungaria / Aegon / Budapest

== Kits ==
HOME
2013–18	2018–23	2023–24	2024–25	2025–26

AWAY
2004–07	2007–08	2013–18; 2019–22	2018–19	2022–24	2024–25

THIRD

2016–2017

== Sports Hall information ==
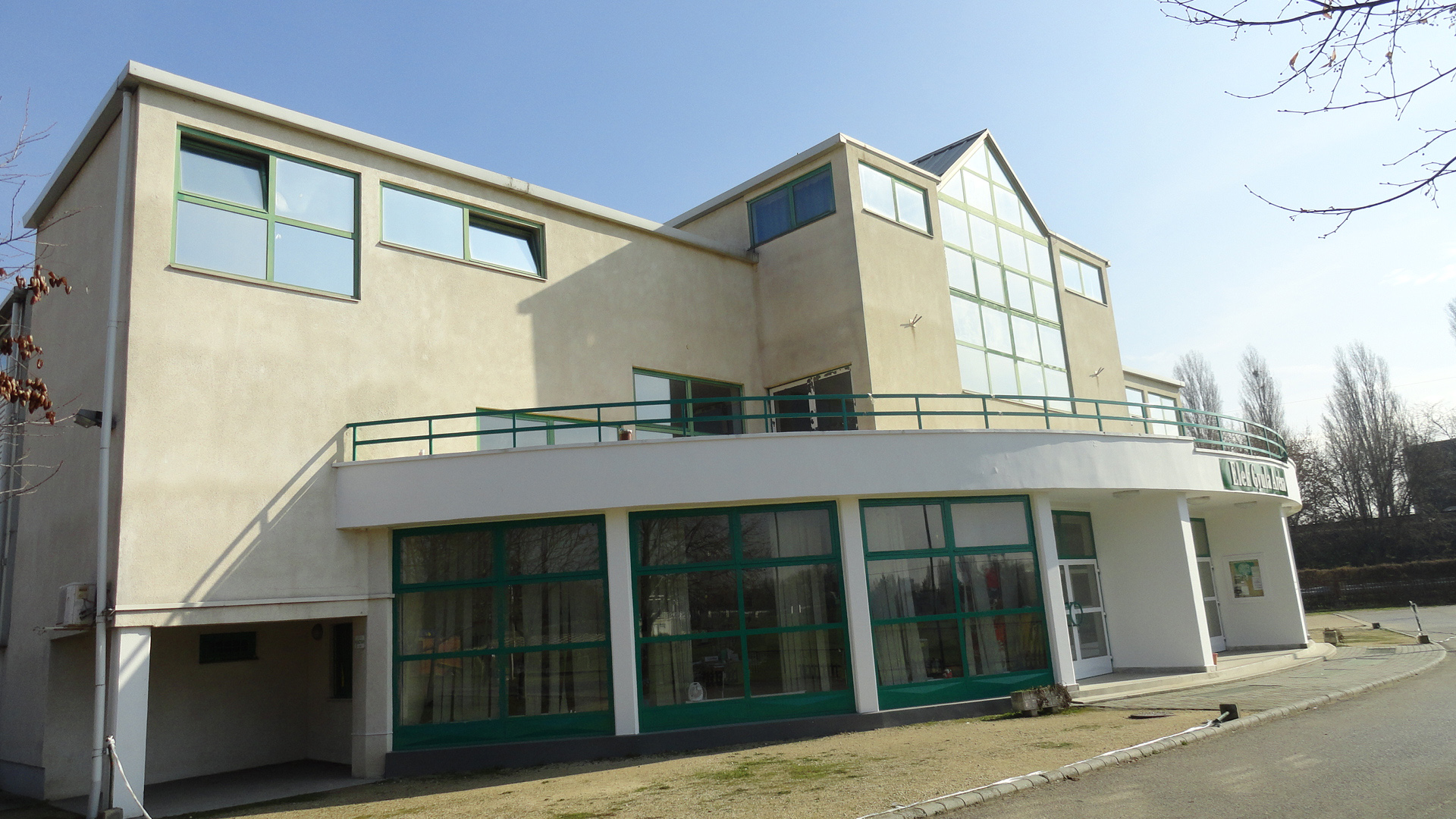
Home hall: Elek Gyula Aréna

- Name: – Elek Gyula Aréna
- City: – Budapest, IX. ker
- Capacity: – 1300
- Address: – 1101 Budapest, Kőbányai út 47./A

== Team ==
=== Current squad ===
Squad for the 2026–27 season

Goalkeepers

- 12 (Denmark) Anna Kristensen
- 16 (Hungary) Blanka Böde-Bíró

Left Wingers

- 15 (Hungary) Júlia Hársfalvi
- 21 (Hungary) Gréta Márton

Right Wingers

- 26 (Netherlands) Angela Malestein
- 41 (Hungary) Bítia Balázs

Line players

- 24 (Spain) Lysa Tchaptchet
- 51 (Norway) Vilde Ingstad
- 58 (Hungary) Réka Bordás

Left backs

- 44 (Denmark) Michala Møller
- 20 (Germany) Emily Vogel

Centre backs

- 17 (Slovenia) Elisabeth Omoregie
- 38 (Hungary) Petra Simon
- 49 (Hungary) Anna Szeibert

Right backs

- 18 (Denmark) Mette Tranborg
- 42 (Hungary) Katrin Klujber

Squad information
No.	Nat.	Player	Position	Date of birth	In	Contract until	Previous club
15	(Hungary)	Júlia Hársfalvi	Left Wing	12 November 1996	2021	2026	(Hungary) Siófok KC
16	(Hungary)	Blanka Böde-Bíró	Goalkeeper	22 September 1994	2016	2026	(Hungary) Váci NKSE
18	(Denmark)	Mette Tranborg	Right Back	1 January 1996	2025	2027	(Denmark) Team Esbjerg
20	(Germany)	Emily Bölk	Left Back	26 April 1998	2020	2028	(Germany) Thüringer HC
21	(Hungary)	Gréta Márton	Left Wing	3 October 1999	–	2028	—N/a
26	(Netherlands)	Angela Malestein	Right Wing	31 January 1993	2020	2028	(Germany) SG BBM Bietigheim
38	(Hungary)	Petra Simon	Centre Back	12 November 2004	–	2028	—N/a
42	(Hungary)	Katrin Klujber	Right Back	21 April 1999	2018	2028	(Hungary) Dunaújvárosi KKA
51	(Norway)	Vilde Ingstad	Line Player	18 December 1994	2025	2028	(Romania) CSM București
58	(Hungary)	Réka Bordás	Line Player	26 August 1997	2023	2027	(Hungary) Debreceni VSC

=== Transfers ===
Transfers for the 2027–28 season

Joining

Leaving

- (Denmark) Jesper Jensen (Head Coach) (to (Denmark) Team Esbjerg)
- (Denmark) Kristian Danielsen (Assistant Coach) (to (Denmark) Ikast Håndbold)

=== Staff members ===
- (Denmark) Head Coach: Jesper Jensen
- (Denmark) Assistant Coach: Kristian Danielsen
- (Hungary) Goalkeeping Coach: Norbert Duleba
- (Denmark) Fitness Coach: Line Hovgaard-Hansen
- (Hungary) Club Doctor: Attila Pavlik, MD
- (Hungary) Physiotherapist: Dorottya Vajay-Gazsó
- (Hungary) Technical Manager: György Szász
- (Hungary) Technical Director: László Paál

== Retired numbers ==
Ferencvárosi TC retired numbers
N°	Nationality	Player	Position	Tenure
4	(Hungary)	Éva Szarka	Right Back	1985–1999
5	(Hungary)	Ildikó Pádár	Line Player	1987–2003
8	(Hungary)	Zita Szucsánszki	Centre Back	2005–2023
9	(Hungary)	Beatrix Kökény	Centre Back	1992–2001

== Honours ==
=== Domestic competitions ===
Nemzeti Bajnokság I (National Championship of Hungary)

- Champions (14): 1966, 1968, 1969, 1971, 1993–94, 1994–95, 1995–96, 1996–97, 1999–00, 2001–02, 2006–07, 2014–15, 2020–21, 2023–24
- Runners-up (22): 1963, 1967, 1970, 1972, 1973, 1976, 1977, 1978, 1992–93, 1998–99, 2000–01, 2002–03, 2005–06, 2008–09, 2011–12, 2012–13, 2013–14, 2015–16, 2016–17, 2017–18, 2018–19, 2021–22
- Third place (10): 1974, 1975, 1979, 1980, 1987, 1997–98, 2003–04, 2004–05, 2007–08, 2010–11

Magyar Kupa (National Cup of Hungary)

- Winners (16): 1967, 1970, 1972, 1977, 1992–93, 1993–94, 1994–95, 1995–96, 1996–97, 2000–01, 2002–03, 2016–17, 2021–22, 2022–23, 2023–24, 2024–25
- Finalist (12): 1963, 1973, 1978, 1986, 1997–98, 1998–99, 2006–07, 2009–10, 2012–13, 2013–14, 2014–15, 2018–19

=== European competitions ===
EHF Champions League

- Runners-up: 1970–71, 2001–02, 2022–23
- Semi-finalists: 1996, 1997, 2001

EHF Cup Winners' Cup:

- Winners – record: 1977–78, 2010–11, 2011–12
- Runners-up: 1978–79, 1993–94
- Semi-finalists: 2007, 2015

EHF Cup:

- Winners: 2005–06
- Semi-finalists: 2004–05

EHF Champions Trophy:

- Third placed: 2002
- Fourth placed: 2006

=== Other tournaments ===
- Baia Mare Champions Trophy:
  - Second placed: 2014

== Recent seasons ==
As of 16 June 2023.

- Seasons in Nemzeti Bajnokság I: 64

Season	Division	Pos.	Magyar kupa
1993–94	NB I	Champion	Winner
1994–95	NB I	Champion	Winner
1995–96	NB I	Champion	Winner
1996–97	NB I	Champion	Winner
1997–98	NB I	Third place	Finalist
1998–99	NB I	Runner-up	Finalist
1999–00	NB I	Champion	
2000–01	NB I	Runner-up	
2001–02	NB I	Champion	
2002–03	NB I	Runner-up	Winner
2003–04	NB I	Third place	

Season	Division	Pos.	Magyar kupa
2004–05	NB I	Third place	
2005–06	NB I	Runner-up	
2006–07	NB I	Champion	Finalist
2007–08	NB I	Third place	
2008–09	NB I	Runner-up	
2009–10	NB I	5th	Finalist
2010–11	NB I	Third place	Quarter-finals
2011–12	NB I	Runner-up	Quarter-finals
2012–13	NB I	Runner-up	Finalist
2013–14	NB I	Runner-up	Finalist
2014–15	NB I	Champion	Finalist

Season	Division	Pos.	Magyar kupa
2015–16	NB I	Runner-up	Third place
2016–17	NB I	Runner-up	Winner
2017–18	NB I	Runner-up	Third place
2018–19	NB I	Runner-up	Finalist
2019–20	NB I	Cancelled	
2020–21	NB I	Champion	Third place
2021–22	NB I	Runner-up	Winner
2022–23	NB I	Runner-up	Winner
2023–24	NB I	Champion	Winner
2024–25	NB I	Runner-up	Winner

=== In European competition ===
- Participations in Champions League (Champions Cup): 28x
- Participations in EHF Cup: 4x
- Participations in Cup Winners' Cup (IHF Cup Winners' Cup): 9x

Season	Competition	Round	Club	Home	Away	Aggregate
2025–26	EHF Champions League	Group B	(Romania) CSM București		28–31	
2025–26	EHF Champions League	Group B	(Denmark) Odense Håndbold	32–34		
2025–26	EHF Champions League	Group B	(France) Brest Bretagne Handball	29–28	31–34	
2025–26	EHF Champions League	Group B	(Norway) Sola HK	26–25		
2025–26	EHF Champions League	Group B	(Slovenia) RK Krim Mercator		33–22	
2025–26	EHF Champions League	Group B	(Croatia) RK Podravka Koprivnica		37–33	
2025–26	EHF Champions League	Group B	(Denmark) Ikast Håndbold	27–24		

=== Top scorers in the EHF Champions League ===
(All-Time) – Last updated on 15 January 2026

Rank	Name	Seasons played	Goals
1	(Hungary) Katrin Klujber	8	578
2	(Netherlands) Angela Malestein	6	423
3	(Germany) Emily Vogel	6	376
4	(Spain) Nerea Pena	7	339
5	(Hungary) Zita Szucsánszki	12	294
6	(Hungary) Gréta Márton	9	262
7	(Hungary) Anikó Cirjenics-Kovacsics	5	248
8	(Hungary) Szandra Szöllősi-Zácsik	9	227
9	(Hungary) Nadine Schatzl	6	201
10	(Hungary) Viktória Lukács	7	189

=== Individual awards in the EHF Champions League ===
Last updated on 4 September 2022

Season	Player	Award
2001–02	(Hungary) Ágnes Farkas	Top Scorer (112 goals)
2012–13	(Hungary) Zsuzsanna Tomori	Top Scorer (95 goals)
2015–16	(Hungary) Luca Szekerczés	Best Young Player
2016–17	(Hungary) Blanka Bíró	Best Young Player
2018–19	(Hungary) Noémi Háfra	Best Young Player
2019–20	(Hungary) Noémi Háfra	Best Young Player
2021–22	(Netherlands) Angela Malestein	Best Right Wing

== Former notable players ==
=== Goalkeepers ===
- (Hungary) Andrea Farkas
- (Hungary) Melinda Pastrovics
- (Hungary) Tímea Sugár
- (Hungary) Olga Hoffmann
- (Hungary) Melinda Szikora
- (Hungary) Tamásné Pusztai
- (Hungary) Adrienne Fiedler
- (Hungary) Krisztina Kerner
- (Slovakia) Katarina Harisová
- (Slovakia) Katarina Miklosová
- (Belarus) Elena Abramovich
- (Serbia) Katarina Tomašević
- (Romania) Iuliana Cioculeasa
- (Ukraine) Irina Sidorova
- (Russia) Svetlana Gridneva

=== Right wings ===
- (Hungary) Dorottya Faluvégi
- (Hungary) Viktória Lukács
- (Hungary) Enikő Tóth
- (Hungary) Melinda Berta
- (Hungary) Nelly Such
- (Hungary) Zsuzsanna Baross
- (Hungary) Anikó Kántor
- (Hungary) Anett Kovács
- (Hungary) Zsuzsanna Pálffy
- (Hungary) Mónika Kovacsicz
- (Hungary) Lenke Horváth
- (Hungary) Erzsébet Kókainé Molnár
- (Slovakia) Katarina Mravíková
- (Romania) Nadina Dumitru

=== Right backs ===
- (Hungary) Nikolett Brigovácz
- (Hungary) Beatrix Tóth
- (Hungary) Viktória Soós
- (Hungary) Éva Szarka
- (Hungary) Rita Borók
- (Hungary) Helga Németh
- (Hungary) Beatrix Benyáts
- (Hungary) Noémi Trufán
- (Hungary) Luca Szekerczés
- (Montenegro) Đurđina Malović
- (Germany) Alicia Stolle
- (Serbia) Jelena Živković
- (Netherlands) Laura van der Heijden
- (Russia) Valeriia Maslova

=== Line players ===
- (Hungary) Barbara Balogh
- (Hungary) Ildikó Pádár
- (Hungary) Gyöngyi Kulcsár
- (Hungary) Katarzyna Borkowska
- (Hungary) Veronika Kovács
- (Hungary) Rea Mészáros
- (Hungary) Piroska Szamoránsky
- (Hungary) Anita Cifra
- (Hungary) Anett Kisfaludy
- (Slovakia) Lucia Uhraková
- (Montenegro) Bobana Klikovac
- (Germany) Julia Behnke
- (Netherlands) Danick Snelder
- (France) Béatrice Edwige

=== Central backs ===
- (Hungary) Nikolett Tóth
- (Hungary) Olívia Kamper
- (Hungary) Beatrix Kökény
- (Hungary) Eszter Siti
- (Hungary) Zita Szucsánszki
- (Hungary) Ágnes Kocsis
- (Hungary) Edina Rábai
- (Hungary) Anikó Kovacsics
- (Hungary) Judit Csenki
- (Hungary) Bettina Dajka
- (Montenegro) Itana Grbić
- (Spain) Nerea Pena
- (Norway) Emilie Christensen
- (Serbia) Andrea Lekić

=== Left backs ===
- (Hungary) Ágnes Farkas
- (Hungary) Klára Csiszár-Szekeres
- (Hungary) Rita Deli
- (Hungary) Noémi Háfra
- (Hungary) Zsuzsanna Tomori
- (Hungary) Eszter Laluska
- (Hungary) Margit Pádár
- (Hungary) Zsófia Pásztor
- (Hungary) Judit Veszeli
- (Hungary) Annamária Ilyés
- (Hungary) Dóra Hornyák
- (Hungary) Csilla Németh
- (Hungary) Szandra Zácsik
- (Hungary) Tímea Tóth
- (Hungary) Éva Barna
- (Hungary) Nóra Valovics
- (Hungary) Kinga Klivinyi
- (Hungary) Klára Kertész
- (Hungary) Dóra Deáki
- (Hungary) Míra Emberovics
- (Hungary) Amália Sterbinszky
- (Montenegro) Marija Jovanović
- (Germany) Laura Steinbach
- (Montenegro) Jelena Despotovic

=== Left wings ===
- (Hungary) Fanni Kenyeres
- (Hungary) Dóra Lőwy
- (Hungary) Erika Kirsner
- (Hungary) Erika Fiedler
- (Hungary) Nadine Schatzl
- (Hungary) Krisztina Szádvári
- (Hungary) Adrienn Szarka
- (Hungary) Orsolya Vérten
- (Hungary) Gabriella Takács
- (Hungary) Mariann Becz
- (Hungary) Mária Krammer

=== Others ===
- (Hungary) Valéria Agócs
- (Hungary) Mária Bende
- (Hungary) Mária Dévényi
- (Hungary) Márta Giba
- (Hungary) Rozália Lelkes
- (Hungary) Anna Rothermel
- (Hungary) Ildikó Tóth

== Coaching history ==
- (Hungary) Endre Balogh (1960–65)
- (Hungary) Gyula Elek (1966–85, 1990–92) Longest serving coach in Ferencvárosi TC's history
- (Hungary) Gyula Elek and András Németh (1985)
- (Hungary) Károly Konkoly (1986)
- (Hungary) Mária Berzsényi (1986–88)
- (Hungary) Pál Hoffmann (1989–90)
- (Hungary) András Németh (1992–2007) Most honours won with Ferencvárosi TC
- (Hungary) Gyula Zsiga (2007–08)
- (Hungary) Gábor Elek (2008–23)
- (Denmark) Martin Albertsen (2023)
- (Denmark) Allan Heine (2023–2025)

== Club name history ==
- ÉDOSZ SE (1950–1951)
- Budapesti Kinizsi (1951–1956)
- FTC (1956–1990)
- Herz-FTC (1990–1993)
- Spectrum-FTC (1993–1994)
- FTC-Spectrum (1994–1995)
- FTC-Polgári Bank (1995–1996)
- Herz-FTC (1996–2003)
- FTC (2003–2006)
- Budapest Bank-FTC (2006–2008)
- Budapest Bank-FTC-RightPhone (2008–2009)
- FTC (2009)
- FTC-Jógazdabank (In 2010, due to the bank's bankruptcy, only for a short time.)
- FTC-Rail Cargo Hungaria (2011–2026)
- FTC-Toyota Kovács (2026–)

== Ferencvárosi TC II ==
Ferencvárosi TC II is the junior team of Ferencvárosi TC women's handball club. They compete in the Nemzeti Bajnokság I/B, the second-tier league in Hungary. Although they play in the same league system as their senior team, rather than a separate league, they are ineligible for promotion to the Nemzeti Bajnokság I, since junior teams cannot play in the same division as their senior side.
