= Anikó Kovacsics =

Hungarian handball player (born 1991)

Anikó Cirjenics-Kovacsics
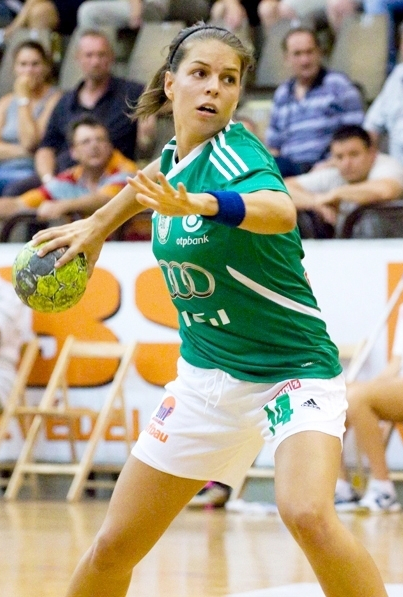
- Kovacsics in 2011

Personal information
- Nationality: Hungarian
- Born: 29 August 1991 (age 35) Nagyatád, Hungary
- Height: 1.70 m (5 ft 7 in)

Sport
- Sport: Handball
- Position: Centre back
- Current club: Retired

Youth career
- Years: Team
- –: Berzence
- –: Csurgói NKC
- –: BerzenceNagyatádi NKK

Senior clubs
- Years: Team
- 2006–2016: Győri ETO KC
- 2016–2024: Ferencvárosi TC
National team
Years	Team	Apps	(Gls)
2009–2021	Hungary	143	(310)
Medal record
European Championship
Bronze medal – third place	2012 Serbia
- Updated on 4 August 2021

Anikó Cirjenics-Kovacsics (born 29 August 1991) is a retired Hungarian handballer who most recently played for Ferencvárosi TC and the Hungarian national team.

She started to play at the young age of 10. She signed to Győri ETO KC in 2006, where she quickly rose through the ranks and became a regular member of the first team at a very young age. At that time she was reputed as a possible successor of world-class playmaker and former teammate Anita Görbicz. Since she had to play on the left wing instead of her favoured playmaker position she decided to leave Győr in 2016, and signed for Ferencváros.

Kovacsics made her international debut on 22 September 2009 against Germany. She represented Hungary at the Tokyo 2020 Summer Olympics, on five World Championship (2009, 2013, 2015, 2017, 2019) and also participated on five European Championship (2010, 2012, 2014, 2018, 2020).

Anikó scored 15 goals against SG BBM Bietigheim in the 2018–19 Women's EHF Champions League season.

== Achievements ==
- Nemzeti Bajnokság I:
  - Winner: 2008, 2009, 2010, 2011, 2012, 2013, 2014, 2016, 2021
- Magyar Kupa:
  - Winner: 2008, 2009, 2010, 2011, 2012, 2013, 2014, 2015, 2016, 2017, 2022, 2023, 2024
- EHF Champions League:
  - Winner: 2013, 2014
  - Finalist: 2009, 2012, 2016, 2023
  - Semifinalist: 2010, 2011
- Women's 19 European Championship:
  - Silver Medalist: 2009
- European Championship:
  - Bronze Medalist: 2012

== Individual awards ==
- Hungarian Handballer of the Year: 2018
- Hungarian Junior Handballer of the Year: 2009, 2010
- Junior Prima Award: 2010
- All-Star Team Best Centre Back of the EHF Champions League: 2015
- All-Star Team Best Left Wing of the EHF Champions League: 2016

== Personal life ==
She has two younger brothers, Péter and Ferenc, both of them are professional handball players.

Her husband is Miklós Cirjenics, Hungarian judoka. Their son, Marcell was born in June 2022.
