= Gábor Elek =

Hungarian handball coach (born 1970)

Elek Gábor
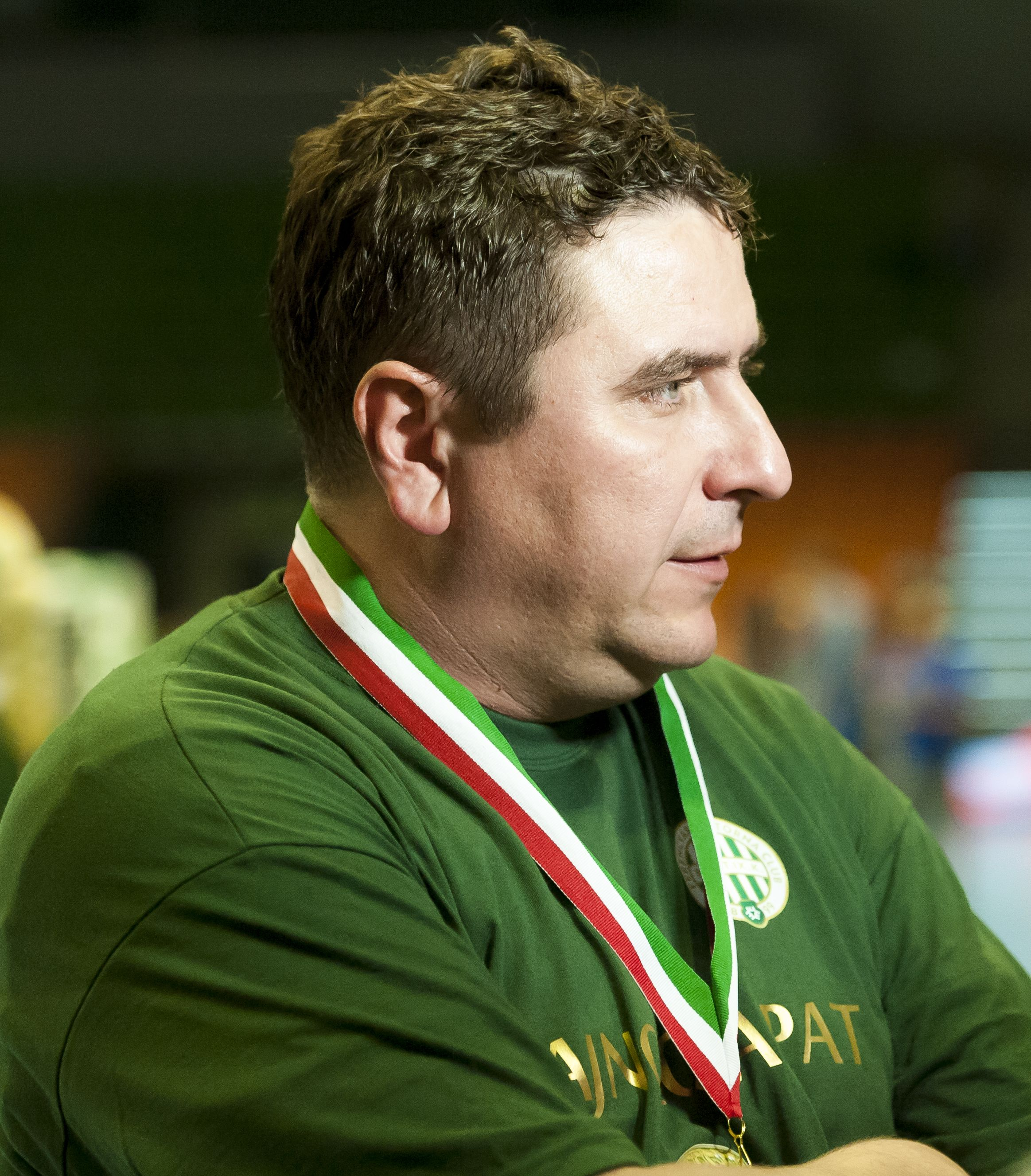

Personal information
- Nationality: Hungarian
- Born: 5 November 1970 (age 55) Budapest, Hungary

Sport
- Sport: Handball

Senior clubs
- Years: Team
- 1980–1990: Ferencvárosi TC
- 1990–1991: III. kerület TVE
- 1991–1992: Hargita KC
- 1992–1996: Solymár Pemü
- 1996–2000: Százhalombatta
- 2000–2006: Csömör KSK
- 2006–2013: Dabas KC

Teams managed
- 2004–2007: Csömör
- 2007–2023: Ferencvárosi TC
- 2016: Hungary
- 2020–2021: Hungary
- 2024–: MOL Esztergom

Elek Gábor (born 5 November 1970) is a Hungarian former handball player and former coach of MOL Esztergom. He is the current head coach of Esztergomi Vitézek, that plays in the third class of the Hungarian women's championship.

He coached Hungary at the 2020 European Women's Handball Championship.

== Achievements ==
=== Manager ===
Ferencvárosi TC

- Nemzeti Bajnokság I:
  - Winner: 2015
- Magyar Kupa:
  - Winner: 2017
  - Finalist: 2015, 2019

== Personal life ==
He is son of Gyula Elek and Anna Rothermel. Elek remarried Zita Szucsánszki with whom he has a son (b. 2019). He holds a degree in chemical engineering.
