= Magyar Kupa (women's handball) =

Sporting competition in Hungary

Magyar Kupa (English: Hungarian Cup) is the main domestic cup for Hungarian women's team handball clubs, which is organized and supervised by the Hungarian Handball Federation. The competition is held annually, starting in September and concluding in April. The teams play in a one-leg knockout system with a final four tournament in the end. The winner of the Hungarian cup get the right to participate in the next year's EHF Cup Winners' Cup, unless they secure a place in the EHF Champions League. If happens so, then the runners-up take the opportunity to represent Hungary in the forthcoming continental event for cup winners.

== Winners ==
In 1954 and 1955 the cup was held on a grand scale. In 1983 they played two series (in February and December). In 1967, 1968, 1985 and 1986 the finals were played only in the following year. Previous cup winners are:

- 1951: Magyar Posztó
- 1952: Magyar Posztó
- 1953: Vörös Meteor
- 1954: Vörös Meteor
- 1955: Ferencváros
- 1956: Bp. Szikra
- 1957–62: Not Played
- 1963: Bp. Spartacus
- 1964: Goldberger
- 1965: Testnevelési Főiskola
- 1966: Testnevelési Főiskola
- 1967: Ferencváros
- 1968: Bp. Spartacus
- 1969: Vasas
- 1970: Ferencváros
- 1971: Vasas
- 1972: Ferencváros
- 1973: Veszprém
- 1974: Vasas
- 1975: Not Played
- 1976: Vasas
- 1977: Ferencváros
- 1978: Vasas
- 1979: Vasas
- 1980: Vasas
- 1981: Vasas
- 1982: Vasas
- 1983 feb.: Vasas
- 1983 dec.: Veszprém
- 1984: Vasas
- 1985: Debreceni VSC
- 1986: Vasas
- 1987: Debreceni VSC
- 1988: Bp. Spartacus
- 1988/89: Debreceni VSC
- 1989/90: Debreceni VSC
- 1990/91: Debreceni VSC
- 1991/92: Építők
- 1992/93: Ferencváros
- 1993/94: Ferencváros
- 1994/95: Ferencváros
- 1995/96: Ferencváros
- 1996/97: Ferencváros
- 1997/98: Dunaferr
- 1998/99: Dunaferr
- 1999/00: Dunaferr
- 2000/01: Ferencváros
- 2001/02: Dunaferr
- 2002/03: Ferencváros
- 2003/04: Dunaferr
- 2004/05: Győri ETO
- 2005/06: Győri ETO
- 2007/07: Győri ETO
- 2007/08: Győri ETO
- 2008/09: Győri ETO
- 2009/10: Győri ETO
- 2010/11: Győri ETO
- 2011/12: Győri ETO
- 2012/13: Győri ETO
- 2013/14: Győri ETO
- 2014/15: Győri ETO
- 2015/16: Győri ETO
- 2016/17: Ferencváros
- 2017/18: Győri ETO
- 2018/19: Győri ETO
- 2019/20: Cancelled
- 2020/21: Győri ETO
- 2021/22: Ferencváros
- 2022/23: Ferencváros
- 2023/24: Ferencváros
- 2024/25: Ferencváros

=== Finals ===
The following table contains all the finals from the sixty years long history of the Magyar Kupa. In some occasions, there was not held a final match but a final tournament. In these cases, the team with the most total points have been crowned as cup winners.

Key
(R)	Replay
aet	Match went to extra time
p	Match decided by a penalty shootout after extra time
‡	Winning team won the Double

Finals of Hungarian Cup
No.	Season	Winners	Score	Runners-up	Hall	Date of final(s)
1st	1951	Magyar Posztó	5–4	Bp. Postás	Sports Hall Court, Budapest	21 October 1951
2nd	1952	Magyar Posztó	7−6 (aet)	Vörös Meteor	Sports Hall Court, Budapest	6 September 1952
3rd	1953	Vörös Meteor	7–5	Magyar Posztó	Baross street, Budapest	4 July 1953
	1954	Vörös Meteor	5–4	Ferencváros	Üllői str., Budapest	28 August 1954
	1955	Ferencváros	7–6	MTK Budapest	Sport str., Budapest	20 August 1955
4th	1956	Bp. Szikra	7–5	MTK Budapest	Sports Hall Court, Budapest	8 July 1956
No Competitions Held
5th	1963	Bp. Spartacus	6–5	Ferencváros	Kisstadion, Budapest	17 August 1963
6th	1964	Goldberger	7–6	Bp. Postás	Tüzér str., Budapest	20 December 1964
7th	1965	Testnevelési Egyetem	12–7	Ózd	Tüzér str., Budapest	19 December 1965
8th	1966	Testnevelési Egyetem	9–7	Pécs	Játékcsarnok, Budapest	18 December 1966
9th	1967	Ferencváros	9–8	Goldberger	Játékcsarnok, Budapest	21 January 1968
10th	1968	Bp. Spartacus	8−7 (aet)	Ózd	Játékcsarnok, Budapest	26 January 1969
11th	1969	Vasas	9–8	Bp. Spartacus	Játékcsarnok, Budapest	27 December 1969
12th	1970	Ferencváros	14–8	Vasas	Üllői str., Budapest	20 August 1970
13th	1971	Vasas	10–8	Tatabánya	Tímár str., Budapest	19 August 1971
14th	1972	Ferencváros	15–12	Bp. Spartacus	Játékcsarnok, Budapest	16 December 1972
15th	1973	Veszprém (5p)	4 roundmatches	Ferencváros (4p)	Tata	20 November 1973
16th	1974	Vasas	13–8	Veszprém	Tímár str., Budapest	20 August 1974
No Competitions Held
17th	1976	Vasas	19–13	Csepel	Municipal Sports Hall, Szeged	11 April 1976
18th	1977	Ferencváros (10p)	4 roundmatches	Vasas (9p)	Home and Away matches	20 February 1977
19th	1978	Vasas (12p)	4 roundmatches	Ferencváros (8p)	Home and Away matches	4 April 1978
20th	1979	Vasas (19p)	6 roundmatches	Bp. Spartacus (16p)	Home and Away matches	3 April 1979
21st	1980	Vasas (12p)	4 roundmatches	Bp. Spartacus (5p)	Home and Away matches	6 January 1980
22nd	1981	Vasas	41–32; 20–13 / 21–19	Bp. Spartacus	Kőér str., Budapest; Fáy str., Budapest	30 January 1981; 1 February 1981
23rd	1982	Vasas (10p)	6 roundmatches	Építők (6p)	Home and Away matches	7 February 1982
24th	1983 mar.	Vasas (15p)	6 roundmatches	Építők (12p)	Home and Away matches	2 February 1983
25th	1983 dec.	Veszprém (8p)	3 roundmatches	Debreceni VSC (2p)	Home and Away matches	13 December 1983
26th	1984	Vasas (19p)	6 roundmatches	Bp. Spartacus (15p)	Home and Away matches	19 December 1984
27th	1985	Debreceni VSC	45–31; 13–17 / 22–14	Ferencváros	Népliget, Budapest; Municipal Sports Hall, Debrecen	19 January 1986; 21 January 1986
28th	1986	Vasas	50–44; 27–18 / 23–26	Debreceni VSC	Fáy str., Budapest; Municipal Sports Hall, Debrecen	20 February 1987; 27 February 1987
29th	1987	Debreceni VSC	54–44; 23–22 / 31–22	Vasas	Municipal Sports Hall, Debrecen; Fáy str., Budapest	17 September 1987; 23 September 1987
30th	1988	Bp. Spartacus	59–44; 24–26 / 35–18	Debreceni VSC	Municipal Sports Hall, Debrecen; Kőér str., Budapest	4 May 1988; 11 May 1988
31st	1988–89	Debreceni VSC	42–35; 22–15 / 20–20	Építők	Municipal Sports Hall, Debrecen; Népliget, Budapest	18 May 1989; 21 May 1989
32nd	1989–90	Debreceni VSC	42–40; 21–20 / 21–20	Építők	Municipal Sports Hall, Debrecen; Népliget, Budapest	4 June 1990; 10 June 1990
33rd	1990–91	Debreceni VSC	48–46; 30–25 / 18–21	BHG	Municipal Sports Hall, Debrecen; Hauszmann Alajos str., Budapest	4 June 1991; 6 June 1991
34th	1991–92	Építők	28–27; 9–10 / 19–17	Vasas	Fáy str., Budapest; Népliget, Budapest	8 April 1992; 15 April 1992
35th	1992–93	Ferencváros	12–8	Vasas	Népfürdő str., Budapest	5 May 1993
36th	1993–94	Ferencváros	49–35; 19–20 / 30–15	Dunaferr	Municipal Sports Hall, Dunaújváros; Népliget, Budapest	15 June 1994; 17 June 1994
37th	1994–95	Ferencváros	54–35; 29–18 / 25–17	Vasas	Népliget, Budapest; Fáy str., Budapest	24 May 1995; 27 May 1995
38th	1995–96	Ferencváros	52–40; 28–15 / 24–25	Debreceni VSC	Népliget, Budapest; Municipal Sports Hall, Debrecen	16 May 1996; 22 May 1996
39th	1996–97	Ferencváros	41–35; 20–20 / 21–15	Vasas	Fáy str., Budapest; Kőbányai str., Budapest	1 June 1997; 2 June 1997
40th	1997–98	Dunaferr	23–23 (3-1 p)	Ferencváros	Municipal Sports Hall, Szekszárd	24 April 1998
41st	1998–99	Dunaferr	31–25	Ferencváros	Municipal Sports Hall, Dunaújváros	6 June 1999
42nd	1999–00	Dunaferr	29–17	Győri ETO	Municipal Sports Hall, Vác	28 May 2000
43rd	2000–01	Ferencváros	27–18	Debreceni VSC	Imre Hódos Sports Hall, Debrecen	1 June 2001
44th	2001–02	Dunaferr	24–24 (4-2 p)	Győri ETO	Kőbányai str., Budapest	14 June 2002
45th	2002–03	Ferencváros	31–25	Dunaferr	Municipal Sports Hall, Pápa	11 June 2003
46th	2003–04	Dunaferr	33–27	Győri ETO	Mihály Magvassy Sports Hall, Győr	3 April 2004
47th	2004–05	Győri ETO	26–24	Dunaferr	Mihály Magvassy Sports Hall, Győr	3 April 2005
48th	2005–06	Győri ETO	28–23	Fehérvár	SZIE Sports Hall, Gödöllő	1 April 2006
49th	2006–07	Győri ETO	35–28	Ferencváros	SYMA Centre, Budapest	8 April 2007
50th	2007–08	Győri ETO	30–20	Dunaferr	Mihály Magvassy Sports Hall, Győr	13 April 2008
51st	2008–09	Győri ETO	32–27	Debreceni VSC	Mihály Magvassy Sports Hall, Győr	5 April 2009
52nd	2009–10	Győri ETO	33–20	Ferencváros	Mihály Magvassy Sports Hall, Győr	28 February 2010
53rd	2010–11	Győri ETO	29–21	Debreceni VSC	Mihály Magvassy Sports Hall, Győr	3 April 2011
54th	2011–12	Győri ETO	42–22	Békéscsabai Előre	Mihály Magvassy Sports Hall, Győr	22 April 2012
55th	2012–13	Győri ETO	36–28	Ferencváros	Veszprém Aréna, Veszprém	26 May 2013
56th	2013–14	Győri ETO	34–29	Ferencváros	OBO Aréna, Dabas	26 April 2014
57th	2014–15	Győri ETO	29–23	Ferencváros	Audi Aréna, Győr	29 March 2015
58th	2015–16	Győri ETO	33–27	Érd	Municipal Sports Hall, Szigetszentmiklós	1 May 2016
59th	2016–17	Ferencváros	29–29 (5-3 p)	Győri ETO	István Messzi Sports Hall, Kecskemét	2 April 2017
60th	2017–18	Győri ETO	27–23	Érd	László Papp Sports Arena, Budapest	1 April 2018
61st	2018–19	Győri ETO	32−29	Ferencváros	Főnix Hall, Debrecen	16 March 2019
63rd	2020–21	Győri ETO	29−23	Debreceni VSC	Veszprém Aréna, Veszprém	16 May 2021
64th	2021–22	Ferencváros	26−22	Győri ETO	Főnix Hall, Debrecen	29 May 2022
65th	2022–23	Ferencváros	28−27	Győri ETO	Multifunkciós Csarnok, Tatabánya	23 April 2023
66th	2023–24	Ferencváros	25−23	Győri ETO	Multifunkciós Csarnok, Tatabánya	10 March 2024
67th	2024–25		v		Multifunkciós Csarnok, Tatabánya	2 March 2025

== Performances ==
=== By club ===
The performance of various clubs is shown in the following table:

Club	Titles	Runners-up	Winning years
Ferencváros (Note: Includes Bp. Kinizsi, Herz-FTC, Spectrum-FTC, FTC-Polgári Bank, Budapest Bank-FTC, FTC-RightPhone and FTC-Rail Cargo Hungaria.)	**16**	12	1967, 1970, 1972, 1977, 1992–93, 1993–94, 1994–95, 1995–96, 1996–97, 2000–01, 2002–03, 2016–17, 2021–22, 2022–23, 2023–24, 2024–25
Győri ETO (Note: Includes Győri Vasas, Győri Vasas ETO, Győri Keksz ETO, Győri Graboplast ETO KC and Győri Audi ETO KC.)	**15**	8	2004–05, 2005–06, 2006–07, 2007–08, 2008–09, 2009–10, 2010–11, 2011–12, 2012–13, 2013–14, 2014–15, 2015–16, 2017–18, 2018–19, 2020–21
Vasas (Note: Includes Vasas SC-Citadella Night Club, Vasas SC-Dreher and Vasas SC.)	**12**	7	1969, 1971, 1974, 1976, 1978, 1979, 1980, 1981, 1982, 1983 feb., 1984, 1986
Debreceni VSC (Note: Includes Debreceni MVSC, DVSC-Symphonia, DVSC-Valdor, DVSC-Aquaticum and DVSC-Korvex.)	**5**	7	1985, 1987, 1988–89, 1989–90, 1990–91
Dunaújvárosi Kohász (Note: Includes Dunaferr SE, Dunaferr NK and Dunaújvárosi Kohász KA.)	**5**	4	1997–98, 1998–99, 1999–00, 2001–02, 2003–04
Bp. Spartacus	**3**	6	1963, 1968, 1988
Magyar Posztó (Note: Includes VL Magyar Posztó and Magyar Posztó SE.)	**2**	2	1951, 1952
Veszprém (Note: Includes Bakony Vegyész and Veszprém Barabás KC.)	**2**	1	1973, 1983 dec.
Testnevelési Egyetem	**2**	0	1965, 1966
Építők (Note: Includes Építők SC and Hargita KC.)	**1**	4	1991–92
Vörös Meteor (Note: Includes VM Közért.)	**1**	1	1953
Goldberger (Note: Includes VL Keltex, VL Goldberger and Kelenföldi Goldberger SE.)	**1**	1	1964
Bp. Szikra (Note: Includes Bp. Szikra, Kőbányai Lombik, Bp. Gumiipari SC and BRESC.)	**1**	0	1956
Bp. Postás	–	2	-
Ózd	–	2	-
Érd	–	2	-
MTK Budapest (Note: Includes Bp. Vörös Lobogó.)	–	1	-
Tatabánya	–	1	-
Pécs (Note: Includes Pécsi Dózsa, Pécsi Bányász and Pécsi MSC.)	–	1	-
Csepel	–	1	-
BHG	–	1	-
Fehérvár (Note: Includes Cornexi-Alcoa HSB Holding and Alba Fehérvár KC.)	–	1	-
Békéscsabai Előre	–	1	-

=== By county ===
County	Titles	Winning clubs
Budapest	38	**Ferencváros** (15), Vasas (12), Spartacus (3), Magyar Posztó (2), TF (2), Építők (1), Vörös Meteor (1), Goldberger (1), Szikra (1)
Győr-Moson-Sopron	15	**Győri ETO** (15)
Hajdú-Bihar	5	**Debreceni VSC** (5)
Fejér	5	**Dunaferr** * (5)
Veszprém	2	Veszprém (2)

- The bolded teams are currently playing in the 2022–23 season of the Hungarian League.

Dunaferr* as Dunaújvárosi Kohász KA

== Statistics ==
=== Records in the Final ===
- Most wins (team): 15
  - Győri ETO (2005, 2006, 2007, 2008, 2009, 2010, 2011, 2012, 2013, 2014, 2015, 2016, 2018, 2019, 2021)
  - Ferencváros (1967, 1970, 1972, 1977, 1993, 1994, 1995, 1996, 1997, 2001, 2003, 2017, 2022, 2023, 2024)
- Most wins (player): 14
  - Anita Görbicz (2005, 2006, 2007, 2008, 2009, 2010, 2011, 2012, 2013, 2014, 2016, 2018, 2019, 2021)
- Most consecutive titles: 12
  - Győri ETO (2005, 2006, 2007, 2008, 2009, 2010, 2011, 2012, 2013, 2014, 2015, 2016)
- Most consecutive appearances: 20
  - Győri ETO (2004, 2005, 2006, 2007, 2008, 2009, 2010, 2011, 2012, 2013, 2014, 2015, 2016, 2017, 2018, 2019, 2021, 2022, 2023, 2024)
- Most appearances: 27
  - Ferencváros (1963, 1967, 1970, 1972, 1973, 1977, 1978, 1985, 1993, 1994, 1995, 1996, 1997, 1998, 1999, 2001, 2003, 2007, 2010, 2013, 2014, 2015, 2017, 2019, 2022, 2023, 2024)
- Biggest win:
  - Győri ETO 42–22 Békéscsabai Előre (2012)
- Most goals in a final: 64
  - Győri ETO 42–22 Békéscsabai Előre (2012)
  - Győri ETO 36–28 Ferencváros (2013)
- Most goals by a losing side: 29
  - Győri ETO 34–29 Ferencváros (2014)
  - Győri ETO 32–29 Ferencváros (2019)
- Most defeats: 12
  - Ferencváros (1963, 1973, 1978, 1985, 1998, 1999, 2007, 2010, 2013, 2014, 2015, 2019)

=== Finals venues and host cities ===
- In the list below are included all the stadiums, inclusive the stadiums from finals with 2 legs.

Matches played	City	Venue	Last final
7	Győr	Magvassy Mihály Sportcsarnok Győr	2012
6	Debrecen	Városi Sportcsarnok	1991
6	Budapest	Fáy utca	1997
5	Budapest	Játékcsarnok	1972
4	Budapest	Népligeti Faház, Népliget	1996
3	Budapest	Sportcsarnoki pálya	1956
3	Tatabánya	Multifunkciós Csarnok	2025
2	Budapest	Tüzér utca	1965
2	Budapest	Kőér utca	1988
2	Budapest	Építők csarnok	1992
2	Budapest	Kőbányai út	2002
2	Dunaújváros	Városi sportcsarnok	1999
2	Veszprém	Veszprém Aréna	2021
2	Debrecen	Főnix Hall	2022
1	Budapest	Baross utca	1953
1	Budapest	Üllői út	1954
1	Budapest	Sport utca	1955
1	Budapest	Kisstadion	1963
1	Budapest	Tímár utca	1974
1	Budapest	Hauszmann Alajos utca	1991
1	Budapest	Népfürdő utca	1993
1	Budapest	SYMA Csarnok	2007
1	Budapest	László Papp Budapest Sports Arena	2018
1	Dabas	Dabasi Sportcsarnok	2014
1	Debrecen	Hódos Imre Sportcsarnok	2001
1	Gödöllő	Szent István Egyetem Sportcsarnok	2006
1	Győr	Audi Aréna	2015
1	Kecskemét	Messzi István Sportcsarnok	2017
1	Pápa	Városi Sportcsarnok	2003
1	Szekszárd	Városi Sportcsarnok	1998
1	Szigetszentmiklós	Városi Sportcsarnok	2016
1	Vác	Városi Sportcsarnok	2000

== Sponsorship ==
Period	Sponsor	Name
– 2004/05	Halászi Takarék	Halászi Takarék Magyar kupa
2005/06	Suzuki Benkő	Suzuki Benkő Magyar kupa
2006/07	No main sponsor	Magyar kupa
2007/08	Halászi Takarék	Halászi Takarék Magyar kupa
2008/09 – 2011/12	Duna Takarék	Duna Takarék női Magyar kupa
2012/13	No main sponsor	Magyar kupa
2013/14	Ringroup	Ringroup Magyar kupa
2014/15	No main sponsor	Török Bódog női Magyar kupa
2015/16 –	TippMix	TippMix Török Bódog női Magyar kupa

== See also ==
- Nemzeti Bajnokság I (National Championship of Hungary)
- Hungarian handball clubs in European competitions
