= 2020–21 Nemzeti Bajnokság I (women's handball) =

K&H női liga
- Season: 2020–21
- Dates: 1 September 2020 – 4 June 2021
- Champions: FTC-Rail Cargo Hungaria (13th title)
- Relegated: Boglári Akadémia-SZISE; Békéscsabai Előre NKSE
- Champions League: Ferencváros; Győri Audi ETO KC
- European League: Debrecen; Mosonmagyaróvár; MTK Budapest; Vác
- Matches: 182
- Goals: 10,292 (56.55 per match)
- Top goalscorer: (Hungary) Tamara Pál (179 goals)
- Biggest home win: 24 goals: ETO 43–19 VÁC (14 Oct)
- Biggest away win: 26 goals: KKC 12–38 ETO (28 Feb)
- Highest scoring: 78 goals: DEB 43–35 ÉRD (2 May 2021)
- All statistics correct as of 4 June 2021.

The 2020–21 Nemzeti Bajnokság I (known as the K&H női kézilabda liga for sponsorship reasons) was the 70th season of the Nemzeti Bajnokság I, Hungarian premier Handball league.

== Team information ==
As in the previous season, 14 teams play in the 2020–21 season. After the 2019–20 season no team got relegated or promoted due to the decision of the Hungarian Handball Federation that they made during the COVID-19 pandemic. No champion was named, the results of the season got deleted and the final league table of the 2018/19 season determined which clubs participated in the international competitions in 2020/21.

Location of teams in 2020–21 Nemzeti Bajnokság I
Location of Budapest teams

Team	Location	Arena	Capacity
Alba Fehérvár KC	Székesfehérvár	KÖFÉM Sports Hall	1,000
Békéscsabai Előre NKSE	Békéscsaba	Municipal Sports Hall	2,300
Boglári Akadémia-SZISE	Balatonboglár	NEKA Sports Hall	678
Debreceni VSC	Debrecen	Főnix Hall; Hódos Imre Sports Hall	8,500; 1,800
Dunaújvárosi Kohász KA	Dunaújváros; Érd	Municipal Sports Hall; Érd Aréna	1,200; 2,200
Érd	Érd	Érd Aréna	2,200
Ferencvárosi TC	Budapest	Elek Gyula Aréna	1,300
Győri Audi ETO KC	Győr	Audi Aréna	5,500
Kisvárdai KC	Kisvárda	Municipal Sports Hall	1000
MTK Budapest	Budapest	Elektromos hall	500
Mosonmagyaróvári KC SE	Mosonmagyaróvár	UFM Aréna	1,100
Siófok KC	Siófok	Kiss Szilárd Sports Hall	1,500
Szombathelyi KKA	Szombathely; Répcelak	Arena Savaria; Répce Sports Hall	3,500; 300
Váci NKSE	Vác	Municipal Sports Hall	700

=== Personnel and kits ===
Following is the list of clubs competing in 2020–21 Nemzeti Bajnokság I, with their president, head coach, kit manufacturer and shirt sponsor.

Team	President	Head coach	Kit manufacturer	Shirt sponsor(s)
Alba Fehérvár KC	Imre Balassi	(Hungary) Krisztián Józsa	hummel	tippmix^{1}, Avis
Békéscsabai ENKSE	Károly Szabó	(Hungary) Gergő Vida	Ziccer	tippmix^{1}, bmw-glass.hu, Budapest Bank
Boglári Akadémia-SZISE	Lajos Mocsai	(Hungary) Szilárd Kiss Jr.	hummel	tippmix^{1}
Debreceni VSC	Zsolt Ábrók	(Hungary) Kitti Kudor	adidas	tippmix^{1}, Schaeffler, Riska
Dunaújvárosi KKA	István Szemenyei	(Hungary) Attila Vágó	hummel	tippmix^{1}, BH
Érd NK	Norbert Tekauer	(Hungary) Roland Horváth	Erima	tippmix^{1}
Ferencvárosi TC	Gábor Kubatov	(Hungary) Gábor Elek	Nike	tippmix^{1}, Rail Cargo Hungaria, Lidl, Budapest
Győri ETO KC	dr. Csaba Bartha	(Spain) Ambros Martín	adidas	Audi, Győr, tippmix^{1}
Kisvárdai KC	Tamás Major	(Hungary) Botond Bakó	hummel	tippmix^{1}, Master Good, Volkswagen
Mosonmagyaróvári KC SE	Attila Horváth Cs.	(Hungary) János Gyurka	adidas	tippmix^{1}, Eu-Fire
MTK Budapest	Tamás Deutsch	(Hungary) Vladimir Golovin	Nike	tippmix^{1}
Siófok KC	János Fodor	(Croatia) Zdravko Zovko	hummel	tippmix^{1}, Peszter
Szombathelyi KKA	Zoltán Pődör	(Hungary) György Marosán	Erima	tippmix^{1}
Váci NKSE	Erika Kirsner	(Hungary) Zoltán Szilágyi	hummel	tippmix^{1}, GVM

=== Managerial changes ===
Team	Outgoing manager	Manner of departure	Date of vacancy	Position in table	Replaced by	Date of appointment
Békéscsabai Előre NKSE	(Hungary) Roland Horváth	Mutual consent	End of 2019–20 season	Pre-season	(Hungary) Gergő Vida	1 July 2020
Dunaújvárosi Kohász KA	(Hungary) László György	Mutual consent	End of 2019–20 season	Pre-season	(Hungary) Attila Vágó	1 July 2020
Érd HC	(Hungary) Edina Szabó	Mutual consent	End of 2019–20 season	Pre-season	(Hungary) Roland Horváth	1 July 2020
Mosonmagyaróvári KC SE	(Hungary) Róbert Bognár	Mutual consent	End of 2019–20 season	Pre-season	(Hungary) János Gyurka	1 July 2020
Siófok KC	(Norway) Tor Odvar Moen	Mutual consent	End of 2019–20 season	Pre-season	(Norway) Bent Dahl	1 July 2020
Alba Fehérvár KC	(Hungary) Rita Deli	Resigned	25 September 2020	12th	(Hungary) Krisztián Józsa	6 October 2020
Siófok KC	(Norway) Bent Dahl	Mutual consent	19 October 2020	1st	(Croatia) Zdravko Zovko	October 2020
Debreceni VSC	(Hungary) Vilmos Köstner	Mutual consent	1 March 2021	7th	(Hungary) Kitti Kudor	1 March 2021
Győri Audi ETO KC	(Hungary) Gábor Danyi	Sacked	7 May 2021	1st	(Spain) Ambros Martín	10 May 2021

== League table ==
Pos	Team	Pld	W	D	L	GF	GA	GD	Pts	Qualification or relegation
1	FTC-Rail Cargo Hungaria	26	25	0	1	892	590	+302	50 (Note: FTC-Rail Cargo Hungaria 58–55 Győri Audi ETO KC)	Qualification to Champions League group stage
2	Győri Audi ETO KC	26	25	0	1	932	542	+390	50	Qualification to Champions League group stage
3	Motherson-Mosonmagyaróvár	26	18	0	8	740	699	+41	36	Qualification to European League group stage
4	Váci NKSE	26	16	1	9	769	753	+16	33	Qualification to European League Round 3
5	DVSC SCHAEFFLER	26	15	1	10	774	717	+57	31	Qualification to European League Round 3
6	MTK Budapest	26	14	2	10	785	805	−20	30	Qualification to European League Round 2
7	Siófok KC	26	16	1	9	803	723	+80	33 (Note: The Hungarian Handball Federation deducted 2+2 points from Siófok KC due to non-payment for two of their players, therefore ended up having 29 points at the end of the season.)	
8	Dunaújvárosi Kohász KA	26	9	0	17	699	774	−75	18 (Note: Dunaújvárosi Kohász KA 55–51 Kisvárdai KC)	
9	Kisvárda Master Good SE	26	8	2	16	649	715	−66	18	
10	Alba Fehérvár KC	26	7	1	18	676	808	−132	15	
11	Érd	26	6	2	18	701	828	−127	14	
12	Szombathelyi KKA	26	6	1	19	653	813	−160	13 (Note: Szombathelyi KKA 55–51 Boglári Akadémia-SZISE)	
13	Boglári Akadémia–SZISE	26	6	1	19	693	815	−122	13	Relegation to Nemzeti Bajnokság I/B
14	EUbility Group-Békéscsaba	26	4	2	20	641	825	−184	10	Relegation to Nemzeti Bajnokság I/B

Source: mksz.hu
Rules for classification: 1) Points; 2) Goal difference; 3) Head-to-head points; 4) Head-to-head goal difference; 5) Goals scored; 6) Matches won; 7) Draw (Note: Head-to-head record is used only after all the matches between the teams in question have been played)

=== Schedule and results ===
In the table below the home teams are listed on the left and the away teams along the top.

Home \ Away	ALB	BOG	BÉK	DEB	DUN	ÉRD	FER	GYŐ	KIS	MOS	MTK	SIÓ	SZO	VÁC
Alba Fehérvár KC		31–34	35–28	20–33	23–21	22–27	20–31	25–40	25–27	27–31	29–30	30–45	35–22	27–30
Boglári Akadémia–SZISE	34–24		33–22	25–35	28–26	28–26	21–32	19–38	25–32	22–33	29–34	21–34	29–31	29–25
Békéscsabai ENKSE	30–30	24–24		23–30	32–31	30–26	23–41	20–41	24–32	23–30	31–32	34–37	23–20	25–39
Debreceni VSC	27–31	37–29	32–24		35–26	43–35	27–29	20–32	25–21	30–31	29–29	30–25	32–24	28–30
Dunaújvárosi KKA	27–24	30–28	41–28	23–24		36–33	21–30	18–40	29–23	29–34	31–28	27–19	24–23	30–27
Érd	25–29	35–28	33–30	24–31	33–28		19–42	26–38	30–30	26–35	28–33	32–37	28–32	30–34
Ferencvárosi TC	39–22	39–24	37–18	31–29	35–22	35–18		31–22	34–22	34–31	35–21	27–23	41–17	32–19
Győri Audi ETO KC	44–21	43–27	10–0	41–23	36–25	35–17	33–27		33–20	26–20	33–21	44–24	40–20	43–19
Kisvárdai KC	21–22	29–27	31–20	21–18	28–26	21–22	26–38	12–38		21–22	32–33	21–29	24–24	30–31
Mosonmagyaróvári KC SE	25–28	38–35	30–26	24–28	28–25	28–24	19–29	20–33	27–19		28–24	30–25	37–26	28–27
MTK Budapest	35–28	27–22	35–28	32–35	34–23	33–33	25–34	23–40	37–35	32–33		33–31	32–29	35–32
Siófok KC	42–20	33–21	31–20	35–33	39–25	30–22	20–38	21–30	27–19	26–22	34–30		43–31	28–22
Szombathelyi KKA	26–21	24–22	26–24	20–32	28–26	27–29	22–42	22–43	21–26	24–29	32–35	26–36		30–33
Váci NKSE	34–27	33–28	41–28	32–28	34–29	33–20	25–29	21–36	28–26	30–27	31–22	32–32	27–26	

Updated to match(es) played on 2 June 2021. Source: Eredmények
Legend: Blue = home team win; Yellow = draw; Red = away team win.

== Season statistics ==
=== Top goalscorers ===
As of 5 June 2021

Rank	Player	Team	Goals	Matches
1	(Hungary) Tamara Pál	MTK	179	26
2	(Hungary) Anna Kovács	DEB	170	25
3	(Hungary) Mercédesz Kiss-Walfisch	ÉRD	166	24
4	(Hungary) Anita Bulath	DUN	152	24
5	(Ukraine) Liliia Gorilska	SZO	145	24
6	(Hungary) Eszter Tóth	MKC	143	26
7	(Netherlands) Angela Malestein	FTC	136	26
8	(Hungary) Kitti Szabó	ÉRD	133	25
9	(Hungary) Krisztina Triscsuk	ALB	130	24
10	(France) Estelle Nze Minko	ETO	127	25
10	(Hungary) Szandra Szöllősi-Zácsik	MTK	127	23

=== Top goalkeepers ===
As of 5 June 2021

Rank	Player	Club	%	Saves	Shots
1	(France) Laura Glauser	ETO	40,97	109	266
2	(Norway) Silje Solberg	ETO	40,37	149	369
3	(France) Amandine Leynaud	ETO	37,50	96	256
4	(Hungary) Kinga Janurik	FTC	36,94	174	471
5	(Hungary) Melinda Szikora	SIÓ	33,39	175	524
6	(Hungary) Zsófi Szemerey	MKC	33,38	226	677
7	(Hungary) Blanka Bíró	FTC	32,84	134	408
8	(Hungary) Bettina Pásztor	KKC	32,69	204	624
9	(Hungary) Kyra Csapó	DEB	31,16	163	523
10	(Hungary) Ágnes Triffa	VÁC	30,36	75	247

=== Attendances ===
Matches between 11 November 2020 and 1 May 2021 were played behind closed doors.

Pos	Team	Total	High	Low	Average	Change
1	Győri Audi ETO KC	10,912	3,813 (vs. MKC)	917 (vs. DEB)	1,819	-44,6%
2	Debreceni VSC	5,800	1,000 (vs. two matches)	700 (vs. two matches)	829	-46,6%
3	Siófok KC	4,890	1,000 (vs. ETO)	400 (vs. two matches)	611	-42,1%
4	Mosonmagyaróvári KC SE	4,150	950 (vs. FTC)	500 (vs. three matches)	692	-32,6%
5	Ferencvárosi TC	3,150	1,200 (vs. MTK)	250 (vs. SIÓ)	630	-34,9%
6	Érd HC	2,850	700 (vs. BOG)	200 (vs. two matches)	356	-70,5%
7	Szombathelyi KKA	2,600	700 (vs. ETO)	200 (vs. MOS)	433	-49%
8	Alba Fehérvár KC	2,300	500 (vs. three matches)	400 (vs. two matches)	460	-28,8%
9	Boglári Akadémia–SZISE	2,000	500 (vs. BÉK)	150 (vs. two matches)	250	-50%
10	Váci NKSE	1,900	500 (vs. ÉRD)	100 (vs. SZO)	271	-47,9%
11	Kisvárdai KC	1,675	495 (vs. DEB)	300 (vs. SZO)	419	-53%
12	Békéscsabai Előre NKSE	1,080	250 (vs. ALB)	230 (vs. KKC)	270	-71,4%
13	Dunaújvárosi Kohász KA	600^{1}	400 (vs. ÉRD)	200 (vs. KKC)	300	-45,5%
14	MTK Budapest	0^{2}	0 (vs. )	0 (vs.)	0	-100%
Total		43,907	3,813 (ETO vs. MKC)	100 (VÁC vs. SZO)	593^{3}	-41,5%

- 1: The team played their home matches without spectators between 4 September and 21 May
- 2: The team played their home matches without spectators
- 3: Matches without spectators are not included

Updated on 8 May 2021.
Attendance numbers without playoff matches.

=== Number of teams by counties ===
Pos.	County (megye)	No. of teams	Team(s)
1	Budapest (capital)	2	Ferencvárosi TC and MTK Budapest
1	Fejér	2	Alba Fehérvár KC and Dunaújvárosi KKA
1	Győr-Moson-Sopron	2	Győri ETO KC and Mosonmagyaróvári KC SE
1	Pest	2	Érd NK and Váci NKSE
1	Somogy	2	Siófok KC and Boglári Akadémia–SZISE
6	Békés	1	Békéscsabai ENKSE
6	Hajdú-Bihar	1	Debreceni VSC
6	Szabolcs-Szatmár-Bereg	1	Kisvárdai KC
6	Vas	1	Szombathelyi KKA
