= 2021–22 Nemzeti Bajnokság I (women's handball) =

K&H női liga
- Season: 2021–22
- Dates: 8 September 2021 – 30 May 2022
- Champion: Győri Audi ETO KC; 16th title
- Relegated: Szombathelyi KKA; Vasas SC
- Champions League: Győri Audi ETO KC; Ferencvárosi TC
- European League: Debreceni VSC; Váci NKSE; Mosonmagyaróvári KC SE; Siófok KC
- Matches played: 182
- Goals scored: 10,043 (55.18 per match)
- Top goalscorer: (Hungary) Csenge Kuczora (190 goals)
- Biggest home win: 22 goals: FTC 38–16 VÁC (20 May)
- Biggest away win: 23 goals: VAS 23–46 FTC (9 Apr)
- Highest scoring: 76 goals: VAS 35–41 MKC (6 Nov)
- All statistics correct as of 27 May 2022.

The 2021–22 Nemzeti Bajnokság I (known as the K&H női kézilabda liga for sponsorship reasons) was the 71st season of the Nemzeti Bajnokság I, Hungarian premier Handball league.

== Team information ==
As in the previous season, 14 teams played in the 2020–21 season. After the 2020–21 season, Békéscsabai Előre NKSE and Boglári Akadémia-SZISE were relegated to the 2021–22 Nemzeti Bajnokság I/B. They were replaced by two clubs from the 2020–21 Nemzeti Bajnokság I/B; Moyra-Budaörs Handball and Vasas SC.

Location of teams in 2021–22 Nemzeti Bajnokság I
Location of Budapest teams

Team	Location	Arena	Capacity
Alba Fehérvár KC	Székesfehérvár	KÖFÉM Sports Hall	1,000
Budaörs Handball	Budaörs	Városi Uszoda és Sportcsarnok	1,000
Debreceni VSC	Debrecen	Főnix Hall; Hódos Imre Sports Hall	8,500; 1,800
Dunaújvárosi Kohász KA	Dunaújváros	Municipal Sports Hall	1,200
Érd	Érd	Érd Aréna	2,200
Ferencvárosi TC	Budapest	Elek Gyula Aréna	1,300
Győri ETO KC	Győr	Audi Aréna	5,500
Kisvárdai KC	Kisvárda	Municipal Sports Hall	1000
MTK Budapest	Budapest	Elektromos hall	500
Mosonmagyaróvári KC SE	Mosonmagyaróvár	UFM Aréna	1,100
Siófok KC	Siófok	Kiss Szilárd Sports Hall	1,500
Szombathelyi KKA	Szombathely; Répcelak	Arena Savaria; Répce Sports Hall	3,500; 300
Vasas SC	Budapest	Amália Sterbinszky Sports Hall	700
Váci NKSE	Vác	Municipal Sports Hall	700

=== Personnel and kits ===
Following is the list of clubs competing in 2021–22 Nemzeti Bajnokság I, with their president, head coach, kit manufacturer and shirt sponsor.

Team	President	Head coach	Kit manufacturer	Shirt sponsor(s)
Alba Fehérvár KC	Imre Balássi	(Hungary) Krisztián Józsa	hummel	tippmix^{1}, Avis
Budaörs	Tamás Neukum	(Hungary) Dániel Buday	Made by club	tippmix^{1}
Debreceni VSC	Zsolt Ábrók	(Hungary) Zoltán Szilágyi	adidas	tippmix^{1}, Schaeffler, Riska
Dunaújvárosi KKA	Attila Gurics	(Hungary) Attila Vágó	hummel	tippmix^{1}, BH
Érd NK	Norbert Tekauer	(Hungary) Roland Horváth	Erima	tippmix^{1}
Ferencvárosi TC	Gábor Kubatov	(Hungary) Gábor Elek	Nike	tippmix^{1}, Rail Cargo Hungaria, Lidl, Budapest
Győri ETO KC	Anita Görbicz	(Spain) Ambros Martín	adidas	Audi, Győr, tippmix^{1}
Kisvárdai KC	Tamás Major	(Hungary) Botond Bakó	hummel	tippmix^{1}, Master Good, Volkswagen
Mosonmagyaróvári KC SE	Attila Horváth Cs.	(Hungary) János Gyurka	adidas	tippmix^{1}, Eu-Fire
MTK Budapest	Tamás Deutsch	(Hungary) Gergő Vida	Nike	tippmix^{1}
Siófok KC	János Fodor	(Slovenia) Uroš Bregar	hummel	tippmix^{1}, Peszter
Szombathelyi KKA	Zoltán Pődör	(Hungary) György Marosán	Erima	tippmix^{1}
Vasas	László Markovits	(Hungary) Gergely Penszki	Erima	tippmix^{1}
Váci NKSE	Erika Kirsner	(Hungary) Katalin Ottó	hummel	tippmix^{1}, GVM

=== Managerial changes ===
Team	Outgoing manager	Manner of departure	Date of vacancy	Position in table	Replaced by	Date of appointment
Alba Fehérvár KC	(Hungary) Krisztián Józsa	Mutual consent	End of 2020–21 season	Pre-season	(Croatia) Boris Dvoršek	1 July 2021
Debreceni VSC	(Hungary) Kitti Kudor	Mutual consent	End of 2020–21 season	Pre-season	(Hungary) Zoltán Szilágyi	1 July 2021
Siófok KC	(Croatia) Zdravko Zovko	Mutual consent	End of 2020–21 season	Pre-season	(Hungary) Gábor Danyi	1 July 2021
Váci NKSE	(Hungary) Zoltán Szilágyi	Mutual consent	End of 2020–21 season	Pre-season	(Hungary) Beáta Őze	1 July 2021
Váci NKSE	(Hungary) Beáta Őze	Mutual consent	19 July 2021	Pre-season	(Hungary) Katalin Ottó	19 July 2021
Siófok KC	(Hungary) Gábor Danyi	Mutual consent	8 November 2021		(Slovenia) Uroš Bregar	8 November 2021
MTK Budapest	(Hungary) Vladimir Golovin	Mutual consent	30 November 2021	7th	(Hungary) Gergő Vida	30 November 2021
Alba Fehérvár KC	(Croatia) Boris Dvoršek	Mutual consent	January 2022	11th	(Hungary) Krisztián Józsa	January 2022

== League table ==
Pos	Team	Pld	W	D	L	GF	GA	GD	Pts	Qualification or relegation
1	Győri ETO KC (C)	26	25	0	1	876	568	+308	50 (Note: Győri Audi ETO KC 49–49 FTC-Rail Cargo Hungaria; Goal difference: Győri Audi ETO KC: +26)	Qualification to Champions League group phase
2	FTC-Rail Cargo Hungaria	26	25	0	1	849	574	+275	50	Qualification to Champions League group phase
3	DVSC SCHAEFFLER	26	21	0	5	758	636	+122	42	Qualification to European League group phase
4	Váci NKSE	26	17	0	9	799	758	+41	34	Qualification to European League third qualifying round
5	Motherson-Mosonmagyaróvári KC	26	14	2	10	812	756	+56	30 (Note: Motherson-Mosonmagyaróvár 74–57 Siófok KC)	Qualification to European League third qualifying round
6	Siófok KC	26	15	0	11	780	763	+17	30	Qualification to European League second qualifying round (Note: Since the winners of the 2021–22 Magyar Kupa, FTC-Rail Cargo Hungaria, qualified for the Champions League based on league position, the Europa League spot was passed to the sixth-placed team.)
7	Kisvárda Master Good SE	26	11	2	13	657	700	−43	24	
8	MTK Budapest	26	9	4	13	691	747	−56	22	
9	Dunaújvárosi Kohász KA	26	10	0	16	701	762	−61	20	
10	Alba Fehérvár KC	26	7	2	17	668	746	−78	16 (Note: Alba Fehérvár KC 57–56 Moyra-Budaörs Handball)	
11	Moyra-Budaörs Handball	26	7	2	17	684	809	−125	16	
12	Érd	26	6	0	20	662	782	−120	12 (Note: Érd 62–59 Szombathelyi KKA)	
13	Hungast Szombathelyi KKA (R)	26	5	2	19	683	827	−144	12	Relegation to Nemzeti Bajnokság I/B
14	Vasas SC (R)	26	3	0	23	681	873	−192	6	Relegation to Nemzeti Bajnokság I/B

Source: mksz.hu
Rules for classification: 1) Points; 2) Goal difference; 3) Head-to-head points; 4) Head-to-head goal difference; 5) Goals scored; 6) Matches won; 7) Draw (Note: Head-to-head record is used only after all the matches between the teams in question have been played)
(C) Champions; (R) Relegated

=== Schedule and results ===
In the table below the home teams are listed on the left and the away teams along the top.

Home \ Away	ALB	BUD	DEB	DUN	ÉRD	FER	GYŐ	KIS	MOS	MTK	SIÓ	SZO	VAS	VÁC
Alba Fehérvár KC		30–30	28–36	26–29	31–29	25–32	25–30	24–18	30–27	30–20	24–33	29–28	27–20	29–37
Budaörs Handball	26–27		32–38	19–31	30–35	16–35	15–36	29–34	34–31	28–28	26–35	32–28	28–20	31–34
Debreceni VSC	10–0	30–21		35–27	34–26	23–29	25–28	30–22	28–19	29–26	32–26	45–29	31–29	30–25
Dunaújvárosi KKA	28–26	27–26	21–22		32–29	23–28	26–36	25–26	29–30	25–23	26–32	26–23	34–28	23–33
Érd	29–28	28–29	22–33	26–29		18–36	0–10	18–17	25–31	33–35	26–28	32–25	29–24	22–27
Ferencvárosi TC	39–21	38–23	29–26	39–24	30–18		29–24	25–20	37–26	32–28	30–21	10–0	37–20	38–16
Győri ETO KC	37–21	44–19	31–23	34–18	42–18	25–20		31–15	35–33	10–0	40–26	44–25	41–21	37–27
Kisvárdai KC	30–26	26–24	27–28	29–26	31–27	23–34	25–31		23–30	28–27	35–34	24–24	33–28	19–23
Mosonmagyaróvári KC SE	29–28	34–28	23–31	37–29	35–26	31–34	22–29	36–26		32–27	48–29	37–30	35–26	31–22
MTK Budapest	27–27	23–24	29–28	32–30	36–28	20–39	22–34	22–22	33–33		26–24	26–35	34–26	29–31
Siófok KC	30–26	24–29	21–23	28–21	31–28	31–33	32–40	24–20	28–26	37–31		38–33	36–24	32–33
Szombathelyi KKA	30–28	28–30	25–29	28–33	34–30	20–40	24–45	22–31	23–23	31–32	24–31		32–30	26–37
Vasas SC	26–24	28–24	16–33	30–28	27–29	23–46	26–45	23–30	35–41	28–31	27–33	32–34		32–38
Váci NKSE	36–28	37–30	25–26	37–31	34–31	29–30	31–37	29–23	30–29	23–24	32–36	33–22	40–32	

Source: Eredmények
Legend: Blue = home team win; Yellow = draw; Red = away team win.

== Season statistics ==
=== Top goalscorers ===
As of 27 May 2022

Rank	Player	Team	Goals	Matches
1	(Hungary) Csenge Kuczora	VÁC	190	26
2	(Hungary) Tamara Pál	MTK	163	25
3	(Hungary) Rebeka Pődör	SZO	151	25
4	(Hungary) Eszter Tóth	MKC	147	26
5	(Hungary) Blanka Kajdon	VAS	143	26
6	(Serbia) Jovana Jovović	BUD	142	26
7	(Hungary) Gréta Kácsor	VÁC	141	26
8	(Hungary) Gabriella Tóth	MKC	125	21
9	(Hungary) Barbara Kopecz	ÉRD	122	22
10	(Serbia) Aleksandra Vukajlović	ÉRD	120	23

=== Attendances ===
Pos	Team	Total	High	Low	Average	Change
1	Győri Audi ETO KC	23,894	5,030 (vs. FTC)	1,075 (vs. KKC)	2,172	+19,4%
2	Debreceni VSC	13,400	2,000 (vs. two matches)	400 (vs. VAS)	1,117	+34,7%
3	Mosonmagyaróvári KC SE	11,750	1000 (vs. three matches)	800 (vs. three matches)	904	+30,6%
4	Ferencvárosi TC	9,700	1,200 (vs. ETO)	400 (vs. ÉRD)	808	+28,3%
5	Budaörs	9,512	1,092 (vs. GYŐ)	470 (vs. DEB)	732	0,0% ^{1}
6	Siófok KC	7,988	1,000 (vs. MOS)	320 (vs. SZO)	614	+4,9%
7	Alba Fehérvár KC	6,600	700 (vs. four matches)	200 (vs. MOS)	508	+10,4%
8	Érd HC	6,342	800 (vs. two matches)	200 (vs. MOS)	529	+48,6%
9	Váci NKSE	6,127	660 (vs. GYŐ)	195 (vs. KKC)	471	+73,8%
10	Szombathelyi KKA	5,350	800 (vs. ETO)	300 (vs. four matches)	412	-4,8%
11	Dunaújvárosi Kohász KA	4,500	400 (vs. ÉRD)	200 (vs. KKC)	346	+15,3%
12	Kisvárdai KC	4,340	700 (vs. DEB)	220 (vs. MTK)	395	-5,7%
13	Vasas SC Budapest	3,850	500 (vs. two matches)	200 (vs. five matches)	296	0,0%^{1}
14	MTK Budapest	2,655	455 (vs. FTC)	100 (vs. ALB)	221	+221%
Total		116,008	5,030 (ETO vs. FTC)	100 (MTK vs. ALB)	667	+12,5%

- 1: Team played in the Nemzeti Bajnokság I/B in the previous season.

Updated after the 2021/22 season.
Attendance numbers without playoff matches.

=== Number of teams by counties ===
Pos.	County (megye)	No. of teams	Team(s)
1	Budapest (capital)	3	Ferencvárosi TC, MTK Budapest and Vasas SC Budapest
1	Pest	3	Érd NK, Budaörs and Váci NKSE
2	Fejér	2	Alba Fehérvár KC and Dunaújvárosi KKA
2	Győr-Moson-Sopron	2	Győri ETO KC and Mosonmagyaróvári KC SE
3	Somogy	1	Siófok KC
3	Hajdú-Bihar	1	Debreceni VSC
3	Szabolcs-Szatmár-Bereg	1	Kisvárdai KC
3	Vas	1	Szombathelyi KKA

== Hungarian clubs in European competitions ==
	Competition	Team	Progress	Result	Total W–D–L
EHF					
EHF	Champions; League	FTC-Rail Cargo Hungaria	Play-offs	vs (Slovenia) Krim Mercator Ljubljana (L)	9-3-4
EHF	Champions; League	FTC-Rail Cargo Hungaria	Group phase	3rd of 8 teams (8-3-3)	9-3-4
EHF	Champions; League	Győri ETO KC	Final	vs (Norway) Vipers Kristiansand (L)	15-1-2
EHF	Champions; League	Győri ETO KC	Semifinal	vs (Denmark) Team Esbjerg (W)	15-1-2
EHF	Champions; League	Győri ETO KC	Quarter-finals	vs (France) Brest Bretagne Handball (W)	15-1-2
EHF	Champions; League	Győri ETO KC	Group phase	1st of 8 teams (13-0-1)	15-1-2
EHF	European League	Motherson-Mosonmagyaróvári KC	Group phase	3rd of 4 teams (3-0-3)	3-0-3
EHF	European League	Váci NKSE	Group phase	4th of 4 teams (1-0-5)	2-1-5
EHF	European League	Váci NKSE	Qualification Round 3	vs (Germany) HSG Blomberg-Lippe (W)	2-1-5
EHF	European League	DVSC SCHAEFFLER	Qualification Round 3	vs (Romania) Măgura Cisnădie (L)	0-1-1
EHF	European League	MTK Budapest	Qualification Round 3	vs (Denmark) Herning-Ikast Håndbold (L)	2-0-2
EHF	European League	MTK Budapest	Qualification Round 2	vs (Turkey) Yalikavaksports Club (W)	2-0-2

== See also ==
- 2021–22 Magyar Kupa
- 2021–22 Nemzeti Bajnokság I/B
- 2021–22 Nemzeti Bajnokság II
