= 2019–20 Nemzeti Bajnokság I (women's handball) =

K&H női liga
- Season: 2019–20
- Dates: 23 August 2019 - 23 May 2020
- Champions: not awarded
- Relegated: no relegation
- Matches: 130
- Goals: 7,142 (54.94 per match)
- Top goalscorer: Gréta Kácsor (140 goals)
- Biggest home win: 27 goals: Érd 50—23 Szent István (20 October 2019)
- Biggest away win: 20 goals: Szent István 19—39 Siófok (10 October 2019)
- Highest scoring: 75 goals: MTK 40—35 Érd (15 February 2020)
- All statistics correct as of 21 April 2020.

The 2019–20 Nemzeti Bajnokság I (known as the K&H női kézilabda liga for sponsorship reasons) was the 69th season of the Nemzeti Bajnokság I, Hungarian premier Handball league. On 9 April 2020 the Hungarian Handball Federation decided to cancel the season with immediate effect due to the COVID-19 pandemic. In the meaning of the decision there will be no national champion named, the results of the season will be deleted and the final league table of the 2018/19 season will determine which clubs will participate in the international competitions in 2020/21.

== Team information ==
As in the previous season, 14 teams played in the 2019–20 season. After the 2018–19 season, Budaörs Handball and Eszterházy KESC were relegated to the 2019–20 Nemzeti Bajnokság I/B. They were replaced by two clubs from the 2018–19 Nemzeti Bajnokság I/B; Szent István SE and Szombathelyi KKA.

Location of teams in 2019–20 Nemzeti Bajnokság I
Location of Budapest teams

Team	Location	Arena	Capacity
Alba Fehérvár KC	Székesfehérvár	KÖFÉM Sports Hall	1,000
Békéscsabai Előre NKSE	Békéscsaba	Municipal Sports Hall	2,300
Debreceni VSC	Debrecen	Főnix Hall; Hódos Imre Sports Hall	8,500; 1,800
Dunaújvárosi Kohász KA	Dunaújváros; Szekszárd	Municipal Sports Hall; Municipal Sports Hall	1,200; 1,100
Érd	Érd	Érd Aréna	2,200
Ferencvárosi TC	Budapest	Elek Gyula Aréna	1,300
Győri Audi ETO KC	Győr	Audi Aréna	5,500
Kisvárdai KC	Kisvárda	Municipal Sports Hall	1000
MTK Budapest	Budapest	Elektromos hall	500
Mosonmagyaróvári KC SE	Mosonmagyaróvár	UFM Aréna	1,100
Siófok KC	Siófok	Kiss Szilárd Sports Hall	1,500
Szent István SE	Budapest; Monor	Municipal Sports Hall	1,030
Szombathelyi KKA	Szombathely; Répcelak	Arena Savaria; Répce Sports Hall	3500; 300
Váci NKSE	Vác	Municipal Sports Hall	700

=== Personnel and kits ===
Following is the list of clubs competing in 2019–20 Nemzeti Bajnokság I, with their president, head coach, kit manufacturer and shirt sponsor.

Team	President	Head coach	Kit manufacturer	Shirt sponsor(s)
Alba Fehérvár KC	Imre Balassi	(Hungary) Rita Deli	hummel	tippmix^{1}, Avis
Békéscsabai ENKSE	Károly Szabó	(Hungary) Roland Horváth	Ziccer	tippmix^{1}, bmw-glass.hu, Budapest Bank
Debreceni VSC	Vilmos Köstner	(Hungary) Vilmos Köstner	adidas	tippmix^{1}, Schaeffler, Riska
Dunaújvárosi KKA	István Szemenyei	(Hungary) László György	hummel	tippmix^{1}, BH
Érd NK	Norbert Tekauer	(Hungary) Edina Szabó	2Rule	tippmix^{1}
Ferencvárosi TC	Gábor Kubatov	(Hungary) Gábor Elek	Nike	tippmix^{1}, Rail Cargo Hungaria, Budapest
Győri ETO KC	dr. Csaba Bartha	(Hungary) Gábor Danyi	adidas	Audi, Győr, tippmix^{1}
Kisvárdai KC	Tamás Major	(Hungary) Botond Bakó	hummel	tippmix^{1}, Master Good, Volkswagen
Mosonmagyaróvári KC SE	Cs. Attila Horváth	(Hungary) Róbert Bognár	adidas	tippmix^{1}, Eu-Fire
MTK Budapest	Tamás Deutsch	(Hungary) Vladimir Golovin	Nike	tippmix^{1}
Siófok KC	János Fodor	(Norway) Tor Odvar Moen	hummel	tippmix^{1}, Peszter
Szent István SE	László Bognár	(Hungary) Gyula Vojkovics	hummel	tippmix^{1}
Szombathelyi KKA	Zoltán Pődör	(Hungary) György Marosán	Erima	tippmix^{1}
Váci NKSE	Erika Kirsner	(Hungary) Zoltán Szilágyi	hummel	tippmix^{1}, GVM

=== Managerial changes ===
Team	Outgoing manager	Manner of departure	Date of vacancy	Position in table	Replaced by	Date of appointment
Szent István SE	(Hungary) János Györfi	Mutual consent	End of 2018–19 season	Pre-season	(Hungary) Gyula Vojkovics	1 July 2019
Kisvárdai KC	(Hungary) János Dévényi	Mutual consent	End of 2018–19 season	Pre-season	(Hungary) Botond Bakó	1 July 2019

== League table ==
Pos	Team	Pld	W	D	L	GF	GA	GD	Pts
1	Győri Audi ETO KC	20	19	0	1	713	483	+230	38
2	Siófok KC	18	15	1	2	608	427	+181	31
3	FTC-Rail Cargo Hungaria	18	13	3	2	579	454	+125	29
4	DVSC SCHAEFFLER	18	11	3	4	560	514	+46	25
5	Váci NKSE	19	11	2	6	559	533	+26	24
6	Érd NK	18	11	0	7	586	509	+77	22
7	MTK Budapest	20	8	3	9	569	616	−47	19
8	Dunaújvárosi Kohász KA	19	7	2	10	480	520	−40	16
9	Motherson-Mosonmagyaróvár	19	6	2	11	495	547	−52	14
10	Kisvárda Master Good SE	19	5	3	11	456	526	−70	13
11	Hungast Szombathelyi KKA	18	6	1	11	466	558	−92	13
12	Alba Fehérvár KC	18	4	1	13	453	553	−100	9
13	EUbility Group-Békéscsaba	18	2	1	15	480	567	−87	5
14	Szent István SE-OTP Bank	18	0	2	16	458	655	−197	2

Updated to match(es) played on 21 April 2020. Source: mksz.hu
Rules for classification: 1) Points; 2) Goal difference; 3) Head-to-head points; 4) Head-to-head goal difference; 5) Goals scored; 6) Matches won; 7) Draw (Note: Head-to-head record is used only after all the matches between the teams in question have been played)

=== Schedule and results ===
In the table below the home teams are listed on the left and the away teams along the top.

Home \ Away	ALB	BÉK	DEB	DUN	ÉRD	FER	GYŐ	KIS	MOS	MTK	SIÓ	SZI	SZO	VÁC
Alba Fehérvár KC		28–25	30–33	22–23	x	17–25	22–28	32–25	29–27	x	x	29–26	33–34	x
Békéscsabai ENKSE	x		25–33	27–29	x	24–39	19–30	x	25–27	32–23	x	34–34	x	29–31
Debreceni VSC	30–22	32–30		24–24	33–29	x	x	x	32–26	x	30–39	39–32	30–18	29–30
Dunaújvárosi KKA	x	32–27	x		25–26	24–30	21–34	24–19	27–20	27–32	x	33–22	x	35–36
Érd NK	35–25	36–29	29–33	26–28		28–31	x	x	39–24	36–24	27–21	50–23	38–21	x
Ferencvárosi TC	x	x	30–30	31–23	33–32		27–28	30–22	30–20	36–22	24–26	x	40–17	x
Győri Audi ETO KC	49–23	45–28	36–28	30–19	39–28	x		45–19	x	38–21	27–24	33–22	x	33–24
Kisvárdai KC	29–20	32–26	28–28	x	27–29	21–31	x		x	24–26	20–32	30–27	25–23	24–24
Mosonmagyaróvári KC SE	30–25	29–28	x	29–22	22–29	x	21–35	24–24		24–23	x	40–23	x	28–29
MTK Budapest	36–30	29–27	36–33	27–27	40–35	36–36	25–31	x	27–27		26–37	x	35–27	23–32
Siófok KC	40–15	34–17	x	35–19	x	31–31	34–29	26–17	38–26	x		45–26	40–21	x
Szent István SE	x	x	24–33	x	x	26–45	23–47	26–31	x	26–37	19–39		24–28	27–27
Szombathelyi KKA	29–29	24–28	x	23–18	x	x	27–41	23–20	32–26	x	26–36	35–28		30–36
Váci NKSE	29–22	x	26–30	x	31–34	27–30	28–35	30–19	30–25	31–21	27–31	x	31–28	

Updated to match(es) played on 21 April 2020. Source:
Legend: Blue = home team win; Yellow = draw; Red = away team win.

== Season statistics ==
=== Top goalscorers ===
As of 21 April 2020.

Rank	Player	Team	Goals	Matches
1	(Hungary) Gréta Kácsor	Váci NKSE	140	19
2	(Hungary) Eszter Tóth	MTK Budapest	138	20
3	(France) Claudine Mendy	Alba Fehérvár KC	122	18
4	(Norway) Stine Bredal Oftedal	Győri ETO KC	115	20
5	(Hungary) Luca Szekerczés	Dunaújvárosi KKA	106	19
6	(Hungary) Anna Kovács	Debreceni VSC	102	17
7	(Hungary) Katrin Klujber	Ferencvárosi TC	101	18
8	(Serbia) Biljana Bandelier	Szombathelyi KKA	97	18
9	(Hungary) Gabriella Tóth	Érd NK	96	18
10	(Hungary) Noémi Háfra	Ferencvárosi TC	95	18

=== Attendances ===
Pos	Team	Total	High	Low	Average	Change
1	Győri ETO KC	32,845	4,874 (vs. Siófok)	2,279 (vs. MTK)	3,285	-8,06%
2	Debreceni VSC	13,800	2,700 (vs. Békéscsaba)	500 (vs. Szent István)	1,533	-7,10%
3	Érd NK	12,050	2,000 (vs. Ferencváros)	400 (vs. Mosonmagyaróvár)	1,205	-1,47%
4	Siófok KC	9,480	1,185 (vs. two matches)	880 (vs. Kisvárda)	1,053	+5,94%
5	Mosonmagyaróvári KC SE	9,240	1,100 (vs. four matches)	950 (vs. Szent István)	1,027	+6,10%
6	Kisvárdai KC	8,920	990 (vs. Érd)	600 (vs. Szent István)	892	+2,53%
7	Ferencvárosi TC	8,700	1,200 (vs. two matches)	800 (vs. four matches)	967	-2,13%
8	Szombathelyi KKA	6,710	3,000 (vs. Győri ETO)	200 (vs. Dunaújváros)	746	+147,02%^{1}
9	Békéscsabai ENKSE	6,600	1,500 (vs. Győri ETO)	700 (vs. two matches)	943	-13,09%
10	Alba Fehérvár KC	5,815	850 (vs.Ferencváros)	400 (vs. Békéscsaba)	646	+4,36%
11	Váci NKSE	5,200	660 (vs. Győri ETO)	420 (vs. Mosonmagyaróvár)	520	-5,28
12	Dunaújvárosi KKA	4,950	850 (vs. Győri ETO)	300 (vs. Békéscsaba)	550	-12,84%
13	Szent István SE	3,997	910 (vs. Győri ETO)	350 (vs. two matches)	500	+320,17%^{1}
14	MTK Budapest	3,800	400 (vs. three matches)	250 (vs. two matches)	345	+16,55%
Total		131,757	4,874 (Győri ETO vs. SKC)	200 (SZKKA vs. DKKA)	1,014	-2,31%

- 1: Team played last season in Nemzeti Bajnokság I/B.

Updated on 21 April 2020. Source: League matches: NB I 2019/2020
Attendance numbers without playoff matches.

=== Number of teams by counties ===
Pos.	County (megye)	No. of teams	Team(s)
1	Budapest (capital)	3	Ferencvárosi TC, MTK Budapest and Szent István SE
2	Fejér	2	Alba Fehérvár KC and Dunaújvárosi KKA
2	Győr-Moson-Sopron	2	Győri ETO KC and Mosonmagyaróvári KC SE
2	Pest	2	Érd NK and Váci NKSE
5	Békés	1	Békéscsabai ENKSE
5	Hajdú-Bihar	1	Debreceni VSC
5	Somogy	1	Siófok KC
5	Szabolcs-Szatmár-Bereg	1	Kisvárdai KC
5	Vas	1	Szombathelyi KKA

== See also ==
- 2019–20 Magyar Kupa
- 2019–20 Nemzeti Bajnokság I/B
- 2019–20 Nemzeti Bajnokság II
