= 2018–19 Nemzeti Bajnokság I (women's handball) =

K&H női liga
- Season: 2018–19
- Champions: Győr (15th title)
- Relegated: Budaörs; Eger
- Champions League: Győr; Ferencváros
- EHF Cup: Siófok; Érd; Vác; Debrecen
- Matches: 182
- Goals: 10,097 (55.48 per match)
- Top goalscorer: Katarina Krpež Slezak (200 goals)
- Biggest home win: 26 goals: Győr 49 – 23 Eger (4 May)
- Biggest away win: 25 goals: Békéscsaba 22 – 47 Győr (9 Jan)
- Highest scoring: 72 goals: Győr 39 – 33 Ferencváros (2 Jan); Győr 49 –23 Eger (4 May)
- All statistics correct as of 18 May 2019.

The 2018–19 Nemzeti Bajnokság I (known as the K&H női kézilabda liga for sponsorship reasons) is the 68th season of the Nemzeti Bajnokság I, Hungarian premier Handball league.

== Team information ==
As in the previous season, 14 teams played in the 2018–19 season. After the 2017–18 season, Kecskeméti NKSE and Vasas SC were relegated to the 2018–19 Nemzeti Bajnokság I/B. They were replaced by two clubs from the 2017–18 Nemzeti Bajnokság I/B; Eszterházy SC and Mosonmagyaróvári KC SE.

Location of teams in 2018-19 Nemzeti Bajnokság I
Location of Budapest teams

| Team | Location | Arena | Capacity |
|---|---|---|---|
| Alba Fehérvár KC | Székesfehérvár | KÖFÉM Sportcsarnok | 1,000 |
| Békéscsabai ENKSE | Békéscsaba | Városi Sportcsarnok | 2,300 |
| Budaörs Handball | Budaörs | Városi Uszoda és Sportcsarnok | 1,000 |
| Debreceni VSC | Debrecen | Hódos Imre Sportcsarnok | 1,800 |
| Dunaújvárosi KKA | Dunaújváros | Városi Sportcsarnok | 1,200 |
| Eszterházy SC | Eger | Kemény Ferenc Sportcsarnok | 875 |
| Érd NK | Érd | Érd Aréna | 1,800 |
| Ferencvárosi TC | Budapest | Elek Gyula Aréna | 1,300 |
| Győri ETO KC | Győr | Audi Aréna | 5,554 |
| Kisvárdai KC | Kisvárda | Városi Sportcsarnok | 750 |
| MTK Budapest | Budapest | Elektromos csarnok | 700 |
| Mosonmagyaróvári KC SE | Mosonmagyaróvár | UFM Aréna | 1,016 |
| Siófok KC | Siófok | Kiss Szilárd Sportcsarnok | 1,500 |
| Váci NKSE | Vác | Városi Sportcsarnok | 620 |

=== Personnel and kits ===
Following is the list of clubs competing in 2018–19 Nemzeti Bajnokság I, with their president, head coach, kit manufacturer and shirt sponsor.

| Team | President | Head coach | Kit manufacturer | Shirt sponsor(s) |
|---|---|---|---|---|
| Alba Fehérvár KC | Imre Balassi | (Hungary) Rita Deli | hummel | tippmix^{1}, Avis |
| Békéscsabai ENKSE | Károly Szabó | (Hungary) Roland Horváth | Ziccer | tippmix^{1}, bmw-glass.hu, Budapest Bank |
| Budaörs Handball | Tamás Neukum | (Hungary) Attila Mihály | adidas | tippmix^{1} |
| Debreceni VSC | Vilmos Köstner | (Hungary) Vilmos Köstner | adidas | tippmix^{1}, Schaeffler, Riska |
| Dunaújvárosi KKA | István Szemenyei | (Hungary) László György | hummel | tippmix^{1}, BH |
| Eszterházy SC | Kálmán Liptai | (Hungary) Viktor Debre | adidas | tippmix^{1} |
| Érd NK | Norbert Tekauer | (Hungary) Edina Szabó | Erima | tippmix^{1} |
| Ferencvárosi TC | Gábor Kubatov | (Hungary) Gábor Elek | Nike | tippmix^{1}, Rail Cargo Hungaria, Budapest |
| Győri ETO KC | dr. Csaba Bartha | (Hungary) Gábor Danyi | adidas | Audi, Győr, tippmix^{1} |
| Kisvárdai KC | Tamás Major | (Hungary) János Dévényi | hummel | tippmix^{1}, Master Good, Volkswagen |
| Mosonmagyaróvári KC SE | Cs. Attila Horváth | (Hungary) Róbert Bognár | adidas | tippmix^{1}, Eu-Fire |
| MTK Budapest | Tamás Deutsch | (Hungary) Vladimir Golovin | Nike | tippmix^{1} |
| Siófok KC | János Fodor | (Norway) Tor Odvar Moen | hummel | tippmix^{1}, Peszter |
| Váci NKSE | Erika Kirsner | (Hungary) Zoltán Szilágyi | hummel | tippmix^{1}, GVM |

==== Managerial changes ====
| Team | Outgoing manager | Manner of departure | Date of vacancy | Position in table | Replaced by | Date of appointment |
|---|---|---|---|---|---|---|
| Győri ETO KC | (Spain) Ambros Martín | Signed by Rostov-Don | End of 2017–18 season | Pre-season | (Hungary) Gábor Danyi | 1 July 2018 |
| Debreceni VSC | (Hungary) Gergő Vida | Mutual consent | End of 2017–18 season | Pre-season | (Norway) Pål Oldrup Jensen | 1 July 2018 |
| Siófok KC | (Denmark) Lars Rasmussen | Mutual consent | End of 2017–18 season | Pre-season | (Norway) Tor Odvar Moen | 1 July 2018 |
| Debreceni VSC | (Norway) Pål Oldrup Jensen | Mutual consent | November 2018 | 8th | (Hungary) Vilmos Köstner | December 2018 |
| Kisvárdai KC | (Montenegro) Vlatko Đonović | Sacked | 6 February 2019 | 7th | (Hungary) János Dévényi (caretaker) | 7 February 2019 |

== League table ==
| Pos | Team | Pld | W | D | L | GF | GA | GD | Pts | Qualification or relegation |
|---|---|---|---|---|---|---|---|---|---|---|
| 1 | Győri ETO KC (C) | 26 | 26 | 0 | 0 | 971 | 669 | +302 | 52 | Qualification to Champions League group stage |
| 2 | Ferencvárosi TC | 26 | 23 | 0 | 3 | 889 | 644 | +245 | 46 | Qualification to Champions League group stage |
| 3 | Siófok KC | 26 | 19 | 1 | 6 | 781 | 616 | +165 | 39 | Qualification to EHF Cup third qualifying round |
| 4 | Érd NK | 26 | 17 | 1 | 8 | 781 | 729 | +52 | 35 | Qualification to EHF Cup second qualifying round |
| 5 | Váci NKSE | 26 | 17 | 1 | 8 | 740 | 701 | +39 | 35 | Qualification to EHF Cup second qualifying round |
| 6 | Debreceni VSC | 26 | 14 | 1 | 11 | 743 | 702 | +41 | 29 | Qualification to EHF Cup first qualifying round |
| 7 | Alba Fehérvár KC | 26 | 13 | 2 | 11 | 717 | 734 | −17 | 28 | |
| 8 | Kisvárdai KC | 26 | 10 | 4 | 12 | 660 | 670 | −10 | 24 | |
| 9 | Dunaújvárosi KKA | 26 | 10 | 0 | 16 | 666 | 701 | −35 | 20 | |
| 10 | Mosonmagyaróvári KC SE | 26 | 9 | 0 | 17 | 612 | 697 | −85 | 18 | |
| 11 | MTK Budapest | 26 | 5 | 5 | 16 | 652 | 727 | −75 | 15 | |
| 12 | Békéscsabai ENKSE | 26 | 4 | 2 | 20 | 687 | 877 | −190 | 10 | |
| 13 | Budaörs Handball (R) | 26 | 3 | 2 | 21 | 650 | 805 | −155 | 8 | Relegation to Nemzeti Bajnokság I/B |
| 14 | Eszterházy SC (R) | 26 | 2 | 1 | 23 | 548 | 825 | −277 | 5 | Relegation to Nemzeti Bajnokság I/B |

Updated to match(es) played on 25 May 2019. Source: mksz.hu
Rules for classification: 1) Points; 2) Goal difference; 3) Head-to-head points; 4) Head-to-head goal difference; 5) Goals scored; 6) Matches won; 7) Draw (Note: Head-to-head record is used only after all the matches between the teams in question have been played)
(C) Champions; (R) Relegated

=== Schedule and results ===
In the table below the home teams are listed on the left and the away teams along the top.

| Home \ Away | ALBA | BÉK | BUD | DVSC | DKKA | EGER | ÉRD | FTC | GYŐR | KKC | MKC | MTK | SKC | VÁC |
|---|---|---|---|---|---|---|---|---|---|---|---|---|---|---|
| Alba Fehérvár KC | | 34–26 | 35–25 | 30–26 | 27–23 | 32–15 | 29–35 | 30–33 | 29–39 | 23–23 | 29–21 | 30–29 | 20–30 | 26–23 |
| Békéscsabai ENKSE | 26–31 | | 31–29 | 31–28 | 23–30 | 28–29 | 30–30 | 21–41 | 22–47 | 29–30 | 30–29 | 30–34 | 25–30 | 28–31 |
| Budaörs Handball | 22–25 | 25–35 | | 19–29 | 23–28 | 28–21 | 25–36 | 26–38 | 30–45 | 24–25 | 21–24 | 30–30 | 23–31 | 29–30 |
| Debreceni VSC | 32–38 | 37–25 | 32–22 | | 21–20 | 32–25 | 34–31 | 30–34 | 31–35 | 27–27 | 28–18 | 30–21 | 25–31 | 33–21 |
| Dunaújvárosi KKA | 32–27 | 30–28 | 24–26 | 24–25 | | 31–25 | 24–32 | 23–36 | 24–28 | 31–28 | 23–20 | 28–21 | 20–26 | 35–29 |
| Eszterházy SC | 23–27 | 28–26 | 31–33 | 18–36 | 17–32 | | 28–33 | 16–31 | 20–35 | 26–26 | 22–28 | 20–22 | 11–31 | 21–34 |
| Érd NK | 32–26 | 45–30 | 31–22 | 29–25 | 29–24 | 35–21 | | 24–39 | 27–31 | 24–31 | 40–26 | 32–30 | 30–26 | 30–27 |
| Ferencvárosi TC | 30–19 | 36–21 | 37–24 | 38–27 | 35–25 | 39–16 | 35–30 | | 29–33 | 35–27 | 30–16 | 36–23 | 29–30 | 39–18 |
| Győri ETO KC | 38–26 | 47–23 | 40–20 | 34–23 | 36–25 | 49–23 | 40–27 | 39–33 | | 36–19 | 33–27 | 36–29 | 35–27 | 41–30 |
| Kisvárdai KC | 22–22 | 32–22 | 31–22 | 17–23 | 30–23 | 31–20 | 23–26 | 27–32 | 28–30 | | 19–16 | 26–24 | 22–27 | 19–25 |
| Mosonmagyaróvári KC | 29–28 | 37–24 | 25–24 | 22–29 | 23–22 | 29–17 | 22–23 | 13–24 | 19–39 | 29–28 | | 29–31 | 27–28 | 21–24 |
| MTK Budapest | 26–27 | 26–26 | 29–29 | 22–28 | 26–24 | 23–19 | 21–24 | 25–35 | 25–35 | 23–24 | 21–29 | | 18–26 | 24–25 |
| Siófok KC | 41–24 | 38–26 | 35–27 | 35–18 | 31–17 | 38–18 | 34–22 | 28–31 | 26–35 | 26–21 | 32–16 | 22–22 | | 28–29 |
| Váci NKSE | 33–23 | 43–21 | 27–22 | 35–34 | 29–24 | 36–18 | 26–22 | 33–34 | 27–35 | 25–24 | 28–17 | 27–27 | 25–24 | |

Legend: Blue = home team win; Yellow = draw; Red = away team win.

== Season statistics ==
=== Top goalscorers ===
As of 18 May 2019.

| Rank | Player | Team | Goals | Matches |
|---|---|---|---|---|
| 1 | (Serbia) Katarina Krpež-Slezak | Érd NK | 200 | 26 |
| 2 | (Hungary) Luca Szekerczés | Dunaújvárosi KKA | 183 | 26 |
| 3 | (Brazil) Alexandra do Nascimento | Alba Fehérvár KC | 175 | 24 |
| 4 | (Hungary) Szabina Karnik | MTK Budapest | 167 | 26 |
| 5 | (Hungary) Barbara Sári | Eszterházy SC | 154 | 26 |
| 6 | (Serbia) Aleksandra Vukajlović | Békéscsabai ENKSE | 153 | 25 |
| 7 | (Croatia) Andrea Kobetić | Siófok KC | 145 | 25 |
| 8 | (Hungary) Mercédesz Walfisch | Békéscsabai ENKSE | 145 | 26 |
| 9 | (France) Claudine Mendy | Alba Fehérvár KC | 132 | 26 |
| 10 | (Norway) Stine Oftedal | Győri ETO KC | 127 | 26 |

=== Attendances ===
Updated to games played on 18 May 2019. Source: League matches: NB I 2018/2019
Attendance numbers without playoff matches.

| Pos | Team | Total | High | Low | Average | Change |
|---|---|---|---|---|---|---|
| 1 | Győri ETO KC | 46,459 | 5,322 (vs. Ferencvárosi TC) | 2,051 (vs. Békéscsabai ENKSE) | 3,573 | +6,40% |
| 2 | Debreceni VSC | 21,450 | 5,600 (vs. Győri ETO KC) | 1,050 (vs. Eszterházy SC) | 1,650 | +12,36% |
| 3 | Érd NK | 15,900 | 2,100 (two matches) | 500 (vs. Budaörs Handball) | 1,223 | -17,75% |
| 4 | Békéscsabai ENKSE | 14,100 | 1,800 (vs. Győri ETO KC ) | 800 (two matches ) | 1,085 | +10,26% |
| 5 | Siófok KC | 12,918 | 1,300 (vs. Győri ETO KC) | 650 (vs. Eszterházy SC) | 994 | +55,31% |
| 6 | Ferencvárosi TC | 12,850 | 1,300 (vs. Mosonmagyaróvári KC) | 500 (vs. Budaörs Handball) | 988 | +27,81% |
| 7 | Mosonmagyaróvári KC | 12,585 | 1,135 (vs. Budaörs Handball) | 800 (vs. Dunaújvárosi KKA) | 968 | +13,48% ^{1} |
| 8 | Kisvárdai KC | 11,320 | 1,000 (three matches) | 750 (vs. Eszterházy SC) | 870 | +1,16% |
| 9 | Budaörs Handball | 9,580 | 1,050 (vs. Győri ETO KC) | 250 (vs. Érd NK) | 737 | -8,10% |
| 10 | Dunaújvárosi KKA | 8,200 | 800 (three matches) | 400 (two matches) | 631 | 0,00% |
| 11 | Alba Fehérvár KC | 8,050 | 870 (vs. Ferencvárosi TC) | 400 (vs. Kisvárdai KC) | 619 | +13,78% |
| 12 | Váci NKSE | 7,140 | 620 (three matches) | 390 (vs. MTK Budapest) | 549 | +4,97% |
| 13 | Eszterházy SC | 4,470 | 875 (two matches) | 200 (four matches) | 344 | +72,00%^{1} |
| 14 | MTK Budapest | 3,850 | 350 (three matches) | 200 (vs. Dunaújvárosi KKA) | 296 | +1,36% |
| Total | | 188,872 | 5,600 (Debreceni VSC vs. Győri ETO KC) | 200 (five matches) | 1,038 | +8,58% |

- 1: Team played last season in Nemzeti Bajnokság I/B.

=== Number of teams by counties ===
| Pos. | County (megye) | No. of teams | Team(s) |
|---|---|---|---|
| 1 | Pest | 3 | Budaörs Handball, Érd NK and Váci NKSE |
| 2 | Budapest (capital) | 2 | Ferencvárosi TC and MTK Budapest |
| 2 | Győr-Moson-Sopron | 2 | Győri ETO KC and Mosonmagyaróvári KC SE |
| 2 | Fejér | 2 | Alba Fehérvár KC and Dunaújvárosi KKA |
| 5 | Békés | 1 | Békéscsabai ENKSE |
| 5 | Hajdú-Bihar | 1 | Debreceni VSC |
| 5 | Heves | 1 | Eszterházy SC |
| 5 | Somogy | 1 | Siófok KC |
| 5 | Szabolcs-Szatmár-Bereg | 1 | Kisvárdai KC |

== See also ==
- 2018–19 Magyar Kupa
- 2018–19 Nemzeti Bajnokság I/B
- 2018–19 Nemzeti Bajnokság II
