= Éva Kelemen =

Éva Kelemen may refer to:

- Éva Vantara-Kelemen, Hungarian handballer
- Éva Kelemen (actress), Hungarian actress
