= Békéscsabai Előre NKSE =

Hungarian women's handball club

- Full name: Békéscsabai Előre Női Kézilabda Sport Egyesület
- Nickname(s): Előre, Csaba
- Short name: Békéscsaba
- Founded: 1973
- Arena: Városi Sportcsarnok, Békéscsaba
- Capacity: 2,300
- President: György Paláncz
- Head coach: Gábor Herbert
- League: Nemzeti Bajnokság I
- 2022–23: 14th
- Club colours
| Home | Away |

Békéscsabai Előre Női Kézilabda Sport Egyesület is a Hungarian women's handball club from Békéscsaba, that plays in the Nemzeti Bajnokság I, after having been promoted in 2006.

Since they are sponsored by EUbility Group, the official name of the team is EUbility Group-Békéscsabai Előre NKSE.

Location of Békéscsabai ENKSE

== History ==
The birth of the team dated back to 1973, when multi-sports club Békéscsabai Előre Spartacus took over the local team Kötöttárugyár, and thus it became one of the departments of the club.

The team have promoted to the top level league first in 1980, and two years later they achieved their greatest success up to date, having won silver medal in the Hungarian championship and reaching the quarterfinals of the IHF Cup (predecessor of EHF Cup). However, the following two decades remained unsuccessful, the club turned into a mid-table team.

In 2000 the handball department seceded from the main club, which caused a staggering setback: with continually worsening results year after year, in 2004 Békéscsaba eventually got relegated.

Shocked by the results, the club with the support of the local government have worked out a long-term conception, mainly based on the new, rising generation. The club have always been well known for their grassroot programs, and have been honoured by the Hungarian Handball Federation for their work with youths in 2008.

At the end of 2006, Békéscsaba fought back to the top-tier championship, and after survived the first two seasons, a slow development has started. The team finished in 2008 in the eighth position, and achieved a fourth place in the following year, with that they earned a place in the EHF Cup.

== Crest, colours, supporters ==
=== Naming history ===
| Name | Period |
|---|---|
| Békéscsabai Előre Spartacus | 1972–1989 |
| Békéscsabai Előre | 1989–1991 |
| Békéscsabai Előre KSE | 1991–1993 |
| Békéscsabai NKC | 1993–2000 |
| Békéscsabai Előre NK | 2000–2007 |
| City-Line Békécsabai ENKSE | 2007–2008 |
| Sonepar Békéscsabai ENKSE | 2008–2009 |
| Mondi Békéscsabai ENKSE | 2009–2010 |
| Budapest Bank Békéscsabai ENKSE | 2010–2013 |
| Eubility Group Békéscsabai ENKSE | 2013–present |

=== Kit manufacturers and shirt sponsor ===
The following table shows in detail Békéscsabai Előre NKSE kit manufacturers and shirt sponsors by year:

Kit manufacturers

| Period | Kit manufacturer |
|---|---|
| – 2008 | (Germany) Adidas |
| 2008–2015 | (Italy) Erreà |
| 2015 – present | (Hungary) Ziccer |

Shirt sponsor

| Period | Sponsor |
|---|---|
| 2013–2014 | Budapest Bank / Csabai Kolbászfesztivál / Puebla Tanácsadó Kft. / Bonduelle Central Europe Kft. / Csaba Metál Zrt. |
| 2014–2015 | Budapest Bank / Békési Pálinkafőzde / AutoMobil Körös Kft. / Eubility Group Kft. / Bonduelle Central Europe Kft. / Csaba Metál Zrt. |
| 2015–2016 | Budapest Bank / Eubility Group Kft. / Bonduelle Central Europe Kft. / Csaba Metál Zrt. / Békési Pálinkafőzde |
| 2016–2017 | tippmix / Duna Aszfalt Kft. / Eubility Group Kft. / Glass Kft. / Bonduelle Central Europe Kft. / Békési Pálinkafőzde / Glass Kft. / Budapest Bank |
| 2017–2020 | tippmix / Eubility Group Kft. / Bonduelle Central Europe Kft. / Galéria Invest Kft. / Glass Kft. / Budapest Bank |
| 2020 – present | tippmix / Eubility Group Kft. / TÖMB 2002 Kft. / Galéria Invest Kft. / Glass Kft. / Budapest Bank |

=== Kits ===
HOME
| 2014–15 | Ziccer; 2015–19 |

AWAY
| 2007–08 | 2010–12 | Ziccer; 2015–19 |

THIRD
| 2011–12 | Ziccer; 2015–19 |

== Sports Hall information ==
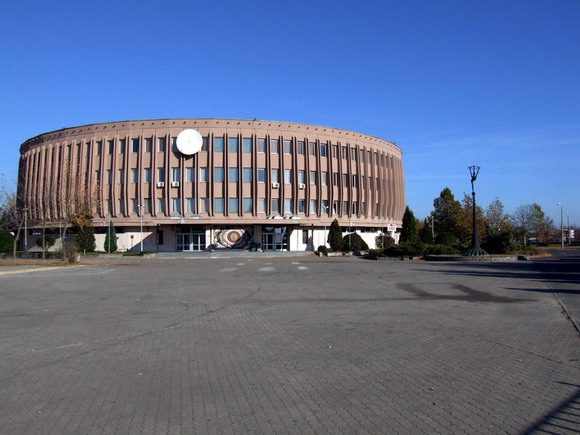
Home hall: Városi Sportcsarnok

- Name: – Városi Sportcsarnok
- City: – Békéscsaba
- Capacity: – 2300
- Address: – 5600 Békéscsaba, Gyulai út 44.

== Team ==
=== Current squad ===
Squad for the 2025–26 season

Goalkeepers

- 16 (Hungary) Dóra Szabó
- 1 (Hungary) Kata Németh
- 73 (Ukraine) (Hungary) Judit Balog

Left wingers

- 33 (Hungary) Klára Kukely
- 57 (Hungary) Szidónia Puhalák
- 45 (Hungary) Csenge Vida
- 77 (Hungary) Sára Hanna Varga

Right wingers

- 4 (Hungary) Vivien Aranyi

Line players

- 99 (Hungary) Bojána Bencsik
- 9 (Hungary) Lilla Giricz
- 38 (Hungary) Réka Koós

Left backs

- 24 (Hungary) Fanni Gerencsér
- 36 (Hungary) Berta Baráth
- 15 (Hungary) Mercédesz Kiss-Walfisch
- 48 (Hungary) Liliána Deme
- 44 (Bosnia and Herzegovina) Jovana Ilic

Playmakers

- 96 (Hungary) Márta Borbély
- 10 (Hungary) Fanni Juhász

Right backs

=== Transfers ===
Transfers for the 2026–27 season

Joining

Leaving

=== Staff members ===
- (Hungary) Chairman: György Paláncz
- (Hungary) Managing director: Csaba Fülöp
- (Hungary) Head coach: Gábor Herbert
- (Hungary) Technical manager: György Petrovszki

== Honours ==
=== Domestic competitions ===
Nemzeti Bajnokság I (National Championship of Hungary)

- Runners-up (1): 1982
- Third place (1): 1991–92

Magyar Kupa (National Cup of Hungary)

- Finalists (1): 2011–12

=== European competitions ===
EHF Cup

- Semi-finalists: 1983–84

== Recent seasons ==
As of 23 August 2021.

- Seasons in Nemzeti Bajnokság I: 39
- Seasons in Nemzeti Bajnokság I/B: 9
- Seasons in Nemzeti Bajnokság II: 1

| Season | Division | Pos. | Magyar kupa |
|---|---|---|---|
| 1993–94 | NB I | 7th | |
| 1994–95 | NB I | 11th | |
| 1995–96 | NB I | 7th | |
| 1996–97 | NB I | 8th | |
| 1997–98 | NB I | 6th | |
| 1998–99 | NB I | 6th | |
| 1999-00 | NB I | 9th | |
| 2000–01 | NB I | 9th | |
| 2001–02 | NB I | 11th | |
| 2002–03 | NB I/B | 2nd | |

| Season | Division | Pos. | Magyar kupa |
|---|---|---|---|
| 2003–04 | NB I | 11th | |
| 2004–05 | NB I/B | 1st | |
| 2005–06 | NB I | 10th | |
| 2006–07 | NB I | 10th | |
| 2007–08 | NB I | 8th | |
| 2008–09 | NB I | 4th | |
| 2009–10 | NB I | 4th | |
| 2010–11 | NB I | 6th | Round 4 |
| 2011–12 | NB I | 9th | Finalist |
| 2012–13 | NB I | 9th | Quarter-finals |

| Season | Division | Pos. | Magyar kupa |
|---|---|---|---|
| 2013–14 | NB I | 6th | Round 4 |
| 2014–15 | NB I | 8th | Round 4 |
| 2015–16 | NB I | 11th | Quarter-finals |
| 2016–17 | NB I | 10th | Round 3 |
| 2017–18 | NB I | 12th | Round 5 |
| 2018–19 | NB I | 12th | Round 5 |
| 2019–20 | NB I | Cancelled | Round 3 |
| 2020–21 | NB I | 14th | Round 4 |

=== In European competition ===
Békéscsabai Előre score listed first. As of 25 November 2018.

- Participations in EHF Cup (IHF Cup): 4x
- Participations in Cup Winners' Cup: 1x

| Season | Competition | Round | Club | Home | Away | Aggregate |
|---|---|---|---|---|---|---|
| 1983–84 | IHF Cup | Quarter-finals | (France) AS Lyon 1 | 26–20 | 29–17 | 55–37 |
| 1983–84 | IHF Cup | Semi-finals | (Romania) Chimistul Râmnicu Vâlcea | 21–23 | 21–28 | 42–51 |
| 2009–10 | EHF Cup | Second round | (Belarus) BNTU-BelAZ Minsk Reg. | 26–24 | 31–20 | 57–44 |
| 2009–10 | EHF Cup | Third round | (Spain) BM Parc Sagunt | 30–30 | 24–26 | 54–56 |
| 2010–11 | EHF Cup | Second round | (Slovenia) RK Olimpija | 32–23 | 22–31 | 54–54 (a) |
| 2011–12 | EHF Cup | Third round | (North Macedonia) ŽRK Vardar | 40–20 | 39–20 | 79–40 |
| 2011–12 | EHF Cup | Round of 16 | (Spain) C.B. Mar Alicante | 19–25 | 25–22 | 44–47 |
| 2012–13 | Cup Winners' Cup | Third round | (Norway) Stabæk Håndball | 22–27 | 28–24 | 50–51 |

Statistics: matches played: 16 – wins: 9 – draws: 1 – losses: 6 – goals scored: 435 – goals conceded: 380

== Notable players ==
=== Goalkeepers ===
- (Hungary) Zsuzsanna Veress
- (Hungary) Anikó Kovácsné Bartha
- (Hungary) Ilona Ajtonyné Bielek
- (Hungary) Ágnes Triffa
- (Hungary) Flóra Sipeki
- (Hungary) Hajnalka Futaki
- (Hungary) Bettina Pásztor
- (Hungary) Kitti Mistina
- (Hungary) Orsolya Kurucz
- (Hungary) Mária Szász
- (Hungary) Olga Katona
- (Hungary) Mónika Klembucz
- (Hungary) Anett Szigeti
- (Serbia) Dragica Tatalovic
- (Serbia) Tamara Popović
- (Serbia) Olivera Tosovic
- (Serbia) Jovana Misailović
- (Croatia) Marina Razum
- (Slovakia) Zeneta Tothová
- (Ukraine) (Hungary) Judit Balog
- (Portugal) Jéssica Ferreira

=== Right wings ===
- (Hungary) Zsuzsanna Baross
- (Hungary) Csenge Hajduch
- (Hungary) Anett Kovács
- (Hungary) Nikolett Diószegi
- (Hungary) Éva Valyuch
- (Hungary) Bernadett Bódi
- (Hungary) Viktória Csáki
- (Hungary) Katalin Zsilák
- (Hungary) Mónika Kovacsicz
- (Hungary) Renáta Kári-Horváth
- (Hungary) Irén Mezőségi
- (Hungary) Beáta Kulcsár
- (Hungary) Edina Bodzás

=== Right backs ===
- (Hungary) Anna Kovács
- (Hungary) Anita Herr
- (Hungary) Anett Szilágyi
- (Hungary) Barbara Brecska
- (Hungary) Margit Felegyi
- (Hungary) Ágnes Suga
- (Ukraine) Olha Nikolayenko
- (Montenegro) Jasna Toskovic
- (Belarus) Natallia Vasileuskaya
- (Romania) Georgeta Grigore
- (Romania) Florica Buda
- (Romania) Rodica Ighisan
- (Serbia) Marija Agbaba
- (Croatia) Andela Žagar
- (Austria) Klara Schlegel

=== Line players ===
- (Hungary) Beáta Bohus
- (Hungary) Anita Cifra
- (Hungary) Lívia Hajdu
- (Hungary) Anett Kisfaludy
- (Hungary) Katalin Tóth
- (Hungary) Luca Dombi
- (Hungary) Szabina Mayer
- (Hungary) Valéria Szabó
- (Hungary) Gyöngyi Kulcsár
- (Hungary) Andrea Kovásznai
- (Hungary) Gabriella Jakab
- (Serbia) Jovana Dukić
- (Serbia) Jelena Agbaba
- (Romania) Sarah Aida Darie

=== Central backs ===
- (Hungary) Tímea Szögi
- (Hungary) Bernadett Takács
- (Hungary) Emese Mózes-Rácz
- (Hungary) Ágnes Kocsis
- (Hungary) Olívia Kamper
- (Hungary) Anna Kukely
- (Hungary) Barbara Kopecz
- (Hungary) Kitti Kudor
- (Hungary) Bianka Barján
- (Hungary) Rita Hochrajter
- (Hungary) Gabriella Vass
- (Hungary) Bettina Dajka
- (Hungary) Judit Pőcze
- (Hungary) Enikő Krista
- (Hungary) Kornélia Baboi
- (Hungary) Ildikó Valaczkai
- (Serbia) Tamara Radojević
- (Serbia) Aleksandra Vukajlović
- (Bosnia and Herzegovina) Ivana Ljubas

=== Left backs ===
- (Hungary) Klára Szekeres
- (Hungary) Vivien Zsuzsa
- (Hungary) Eszter Laluska
- (Hungary) Hortenzia Szrnka
- (Hungary) Gyöngyi Drávai
- (Hungary) Rita Termány
- (Hungary) Mercédesz Walfisch
- (Hungary) Annamária Félix
- (Hungary) Tímea Kovács
- (Hungary) Tünde Szabó
- (Hungary) Mária Bolla
- (Hungary) Kitti Gyimesi
- (Hungary) Éva Bozó
- (Slovakia) Renata Jancarová
- (Serbia) Leposava Glušica
- (Serbia) Jovana Kovačević
- (Serbia) Mariana Trbojevic
- (Serbia) Ivana Mitrović
- (Serbia) Boglárka Vámos
- (Serbia) Sandra Radović
- (Montenegro) Tamara Jovičevič
- (Croatia) Tena Petika
- (Croatia) Sara Sablic
- (Turkey) (Sweden) Fatos Kücükyildiz
- (Russia) Elena Lipovka
- (Portugal) Mariana Lopes

=== Left wings ===
- (Hungary) Erika Sávolt
- (Hungary) Adrienn Szarka
- (Hungary) Tímea Ancsin
- (Hungary) Éva Vantara-Kelemen
- (Hungary) Szonja Gávai
- (Hungary) Nikolett Kurgyis
- (Hungary) Zsuzsanna Vincze
- (Hungary) Edina Bacsa
- (Hungary) Judit Kovács
- (Hungary) Ibolya Szabados
- (Serbia) Anastazija Đoković

=== Others ===
- (Hungary) Gabriella Salamon

== Coaches ==
- (Hungary) Károly Szabó (1981–1987; 1989–1990; 1995–1998; 2000–2002; 2004–2005)
- (Hungary) György Buday (1988–1989)
- (Hungary) Sándor Rácz (1990–1991; 1998–1999)
- (Hungary) Pálné Csulik (1991–1992)
- (Hungary) Zoltán Fellegvári (1987)
- (Hungary) Lászlóné Tobak (1993–1995; 2002)
- (Hungary) József Farkas (1999–2000)
- (Hungary) Norbert Gera (2003–2004)
- (Hungary) Ferenc Gávai (2005)
- (Hungary) Tamás Rapatyi (2005–2007)
- (Hungary) Eszter Mátéfi (2007–2010)
- (Hungary) Beáta Bohus (2010–2011)
- (Hungary) Péter Kovács (2011–2012)
- (Hungary) Csaba Ökrös (2012–2013)
- (Hungary) Botond Bakó (2013–2014)
- (Hungary) György Avar (2014–2016)
- (Hungary) László Skaliczki (2016–2018)
- (Hungary) Roland Horváth (2018–2020)
- (Hungary) Gergő Vida (2020–2021)
- (Hungary) Bálint Papp (2021–2023)
- (Hungary) József Farkas (2023)
- (Hungary) (Serbia) Sándor Rác (2023–2025)
- (Hungary) Gábor Herbert (2025)
- (Hungary) György Marosán (2025–)

== See also ==
- Békéscsaba 1912 Előre SE
