= Váci NKSE =

Hungarian women's handball club

Praktiker-Vác
- Full name: Váci Női Kézilabda Sport Egyesület
- Short name: Vác
- Founded: 1948; 78 years ago
- Arena: Városi Sportcsarnok, Vác
- Capacity: 700
- President: Erika Kirsner
- Head coach: Roland Horváth
- League: Nemzeti Bajnokság I
- 2021–22: Nemzeti Bajnokság I, 4th
- Club colours
Home	Away

Váci NKSE are a Hungarian women's handball club from Vác, that play in the Nemzeti Bajnokság I. Founded in 1949, the team have won promotion to the top-level championship first in 1998. Since then, they have been improved year by year and achieved their best result in 2010 by finishing third. However, in 2011, the club's main sponsor stepped down, following which Vác had to cut their budget and lost many of their key players.

Location of Praktiker-Vác

== Crest, colours, supporters ==
=== Naming history ===
- –1996: Váci FORTE SC
- 1996–1997: Optotrans Vác
- 1997–2001: Synergon SE Vác
- 2001–2004: Váci NK
- 2004–2010: Váci NKSE
- 2010–2011: Syma-Váci NKSE
- 2011–2013: Váci NKSE
- 2013–2017: Ipress Center-Vác
- 2017–2019: GVM Europe-Vác
- 2019–2022: Váci NKSE
- 2022–: Praktiker-Vác

=== Kit manufacturers and Shirt sponsor ===
The following table shows in detail Váci NKSE kit manufacturers and shirt sponsors by year:

Period	Kit manufacturer	Shirt sponsor
2004–2005	hummel	Zollner
2008–2009	Kipsta	Vác / Pólus Palace Golf Hotel
2009–2011	Kipsta	SYMA / Vác
2011–2012	Kipsta	Infopress Group / Vác / Bunt 24
2012–2013	Erima	Infopress Group / Vác / Bunt 24
2013–2017	Erima	IPress Center
2017–2022	hummel	GVM Europe Kft.
2019 - 2020	hummel	Szerencsejáték Zrt.
2020 - 2021	hummel	Szerencsejáték Zrt. / Pro-Mees Kft.
2021 - 2022	hummel	Szerencsejáték Zrt. / Lukács és Tamás Kft.
2022 - 2023	Adidas	Praktiker / Szerencsejáték Zrt. / Lukács és Tamás Kft.

== Kits ==
HOME
Kipsta; 2009–10	2017–18	2018–20	2022–23

AWAY
2016–17	2017–18	2018–19	2019–20	2020-21	2022–23

THIRD
2017-18	2018-19	2019-20	2020-21	2022–23

== Team ==
=== Current squad ===
Squad for the 2026–27 season

- Head coach: Roland Horváth
- Goalkeeping coach: Ildikó Meggyes
- Fitness coach: Tamás Fazekas
- Masseur: Ágnes Sztranyan
- Physiotherapist: Zsófia Horváth
- Doctor: Dr. Péter Bánhidi
- Chairman: Erika Kirsner
- Professional director: András Németh

Goalkeepers

- 77 (Hungary) Klára Zaj
- 1 (Hungary) Fanni Csizmadia

RW

- 19 (Hungary) Anna Pálffy

LW

- 55 (Hungary) Kíra Wald
- (Hungary) Fanni Török

Line players

- 80 (Hungary) Luca Kövér
- (Hungary) Sára Paróczy

Left backs

- 26 (Hungary) Noémi Kacsó
- 52 (Hungary) Gréta Juhász (injured)
- (Hungary) Flóra Szeberényi
- (Hungary) Luca Poczetnyik

Centre backs

- 10 (Hungary) Blanka Kajdon
- 50 (Hungary) Liza Pálmai
- (Hungary) Dóra Kellermann
- (Hungary) Renáta Keceli-Mészáros

Right backs

=== Transfers ===
Transfers for the 2026–27 season

Joining

- (Hungary) Sára Paróczy (LP) from (Hungary) Érdi VSE
- (Hungary) Flóra Szeberényi (LB) from (Hungary) Szombathelyi KKA
- (Hungary) Luca Poczetnyik (LB) from (Hungary) Kisvárdai KC
- (Hungary) Fanni Török (LW) from (Hungary) Szombathelyi KKA
- (Hungary) Renáta Keceli-Mészáros (CB) from (Hungary) Győri Audi ETO KC

Leaving

- (Hungary) Sára Afentáler (RB) to (Romania) CSM Corona Brașov
- (Hungary) Emőke Varga (LP) to (Romania) CSM Corona Brașov
- (Hungary) Orsolya Pelczéder (LW) (retires)
- (Hungary) Luca Csíkos (LB) (to (Hungary) Ferencváros)
- (Hungary) Aida Kurucz (CB) (to (Hungary) MTK Budapest)
- (Hungary) Nelli Such (RW)

== Honours ==
=== Domestic competitions ===
Nemzeti Bajnokság I (National Championship of Hungary)

- Third place (1): 2009–10

Magyar Kupa (National Cup of Hungary)

- Bronze medal (2): 2002–03, 2011–12

=== European competitions ===
EHF Cup Winners' Cup:

- Quarterfinalists: 2004

== Recent seasons ==
As of 6 March 2023.

- Seasons in Nemzeti Bajnokság I: 26
- Seasons in Nemzeti Bajnokság I/B: 8
- Seasons in Nemzeti Bajnokság II: 27

Season	Division	Pos.	Magyar kupa
1993-94	NB I/B	4th	
1994-95	NB I/B	9th	
1995-96	NB I/B	12th	
1996-97	NB I/B	9th	
1997-98	NB I/B	1st	
1998-99	NB I	8th	
1999-00	NB I	6th	
2000-01	NB I	8th	
2001-02	NB I	8th	
2002-03	NB I	7th	Third place

Season	Division	Pos.	Magyar kupa
2003-04	NB I	4th	
2004-05	NB I	6th	
2005-06	NB I	9th	
2006-07	NB I	9th	
2007-08	NB I	9th	
2008-09	NB I	9th	
2009-10	NB I	Third place	
2010-11	NB I	4th	Fourth place
2011-12	NB I	7th	Third place
2012-13	NB I	4th	Round 3

Season	Division	Pos.	Magyar kupa
2013-14	NB I	7th	Round 4
2014-15	NB I	9th	Round 3
2015-16	NB I	7th	Quarter-finals
2016-17	NB I	5th	Round 3
2017-18	NB I	6th	Round 5
2018–19	NB I	5th	Round 5
2019–20	NB I	Cancelled	
2020–21	NB I	5th	Round 5
2021–22	NB I	4th	Round 5
2022–23	NB I		

=== In European competition ===
Vác score listed first. As of 19 February 2023.

- Participations in EHF European League (EHF Cup): 9x
- Participations in Cup Winners' Cup: 4x

Season	Competition	Round	Club	Home	Away	Aggregate
2003–04	Cup Winners' Cup	Second round	(Greece) Ormi Patras	38–27	33–21	71–48
2003–04	Cup Winners' Cup	Third round	(Norway) Byåsen	32–31	23–17	55–48
2003–04	Cup Winners' Cup	Fourth round	(France) Nîmes	24–23	24–21	48–44
2003–04	Cup Winners' Cup	Quarter-finals	(Austria) Hypo Niederösterreich	26–30	15–30	41–60
2004–05	Cup Winners' Cup	Second round	(Bosnia and Herzegovina) Banja Luka	30–18	32–23	62–41
2004–05	Cup Winners' Cup	Third round	(North Macedonia) Tutunski	37–19	32–18	69–37
2004–05	Cup Winners' Cup	Fourth round	(Germany) Nürnberg	19–26	25–32	44–58
2005–06	Cup Winners' Cup	Second round	(Slovakia) Banská Bystrica	33–24	27–28	60–52
2005–06	Cup Winners' Cup	Third round	(Serbia and Montenegro) Naisa Niš	32–26	24–26	56–52
2005–06	Cup Winners' Cup	Fourth round	(Norway) Gjerpen	25–27	23–37	48–64
2010–11	EHF Cup	Second round	(Poland) Gdynia	38–25	40–32	78–57
2010–11	EHF Cup	Third round	(Spain) Elda Prestigio	38–30	43–35	81–65
2010–11	EHF Cup	Round of 16	(Norway) Byåsen	31–24	29–34	60–58
2010–11	EHF Cup	Quarter-finals	(Denmark) Holstebro	28–29	32–36	60–65
2011–12	EHF Cup	Third round	(Belarus) Minsk	24–23	35–32	59–55
2011–12	EHF Cup	Round of 16	(Turkey) Maliye Milli Piyango	24–20	28–35	52–55
2012–13	Cup Winners' Cup	Third round	(Croatia) Lokomotiva Zagreb	29–20	26–28	55–48
2012–13	Cup Winners' Cup	Round of 16	(Croatia) Podravka Koprivnica	29–19	15–23	44–42
2012–13	Cup Winners' Cup	Quarter-finals	(France) Issy Paris	24–23	23–27	47–50
2013–14	EHF Cup	Third round	(Netherlands) Amsterdam	25–18	24–25	49–43
2013–14	EHF Cup	Round of 16	(Hungary) Alba Fehérvár	25–24	19–22	44–46
2017–18	EHF Cup	First qualifying round	(Israel) Holon	46–17	44–18	90–35
2017–18	EHF Cup	Second qualifying round	(Germany) Buxtehude	29–22	26–33	55–55 (a)
2017–18	EHF Cup	Third qualifying round	(Turkey) Kastamonu Bld. GSK	24–26	29–36	53–62
2018–19	EHF Cup	First qualifying round	(Israel) Ramat Gan	39–27	45–27	84–54
2018–19	EHF Cup	Second qualifying round	(Hungary) Siófok	22–35	26–32	48–67
2019–20	EHF Cup	Second qualifying round	(Austria) Hypo Niederösterreich	26–22	30–23	56–45
2019–20	EHF Cup	Third qualifying round	(Turkey) Kastamonu Bld. GSK	30–25	26–33	56–58
2020–21	EHF European League	Qualification Round 3	(Czech Republic) DHK Baník Most	42–41		
2020–21	EHF European League	Group stage (Group A)	(Denmark) Herning-Ikast Håndbold	26–38	29–39	4th
2020–21	EHF European League	Group stage (Group A)	(Russia) Zvezda Zvenigorod	29–30	33–29	4th
2020–21	EHF European League	Group stage (Group A)	(France) Paris 92	33–34	0–10	4th
2021–22	EHF European League	Qualification Round 3	(Germany) HSG Blomberg-Lippe	32–27	24–24	56–51
2021–22	EHF European League	Group stage (Group D)	(Denmark) Viborg HK	25–26	21–42	4th
2021–22	EHF European League	Group stage (Group D)	(Romania) SCM Râmnicu Vâlcea	30–31	29–39	4th
2021–22	EHF European League	Group stage (Group D)	(France) Chambray Touraine	35–29	27–29	4th
2022–23	EHF European League	Qualification Round 3	(Switzerland) LC Brühl Handball	30–26	38–29	68–55
2022–23	EHF European League	Group stage (Group D)	(France) Paris 92	27–26	24–26	4th
2022–23	EHF European League	Group stage (Group D)	(Romania) SCM Râmnicu Vâlcea	26–28	30–40	4th
2022–23	EHF European League	Group stage (Group D)	(Germany) Thüringer HC	28–34	21–31	4th

== Notable players ==
=== Goalkeepers ===
- (Hungary) Blanka Bíró
- (Hungary) Ágnes Triffa
- (Hungary) Orsolya Herr
- (Hungary) Edina Juhász
- (Hungary) Bettina Pásztor
- (Hungary) Anna Bukovszky
- (Hungary) Flóra Sipeki
- (Hungary) Nóra Lajtos
- (Brazil) Barbara Arenhart
- (Romania) Eszter Bántó
- (Slovakia) Katarina Péntek-Dózsa
- (Russia) Svetlana Gridnieva
- (Serbia) Olivera Tosovic

=== Right wings ===
- (Hungary) Melinda Berta
- (Hungary) Nikolett Diószegi
- (Hungary) Adrienn Orbán
- (Hungary) Zsuzsanna Baross
- (Hungary) Nóra Povázsay
- (Hungary) Beáta Gráner
- (Hungary) (Serbia) Andrea Sterbik
- (Brazil) Alexandra do Nascimento
- (Croatia) Ana Niksic
- (Croatia) Dijana Jovetić

=== Right backs ===
- (Hungary) Viktória Soós
- (Hungary) Ágnes Hornyák
- (Hungary) Noémi Trufán
- (Hungary) Anett Szilágyi
- (Socialist Federal Republic of Yugoslavia) Danica Nikic

=== Line players ===
- (Hungary) Piroska Szamoránszky
- (Hungary) Rea Mészáros
- (Hungary) Andrea Fülöp
- (Hungary) Katarzyna Borkowska
- (Hungary) Cecília Őri
- (Hungary) Noémi Dakos
- (Hungary) Fanny Helembai
- (Hungary) Szabina Mayer
- (Hungary) Laura Szabó
- (Hungary) Szilvia Ábrahám
- (Hungary) Éva Agárdi
- (Montenegro) Sara Vukčević
- (Slovakia) Lucia Uhraková
- (Ukraine) Svetlana Moskovaya

=== Central backs ===
- (Hungary) Bernadett Temes
- (Hungary) Szabina Tápai
- (Hungary) Veronika Farkas
- (Hungary) Edina Rábai
- (Hungary) Rita Lakatos
- (Hungary) Eszter Siti
- (Hungary) Olívia Kamper
- (Hungary) Konszuéla Hámori
- (Hungary) Krisztina Gyetván
- (Hungary) Judit Csenki
- (Austria) Patrícia Kovács
- (Serbia) Kristina Liščević
- (Ukraine) Ganna Siukalo

=== Left backs ===
- (Hungary) Auguszta Mátyás
- (Hungary) Szandra Zácsik
- (Hungary) Kinga Klivinyi
- (Hungary) Annamária Ilyés
- (Hungary) Dóra Hornyák
- (Hungary) Tímea Tóth
- (Hungary) Gyöngyi Drávai
- (Hungary) Margit Pádár
- (Hungary) Noémi Háfra
- (Hungary) Judit Veszeli
- (Hungary) Gréta Kácsor
- (Hungary) (Romania) Melinda Erdős
- (Brazil) Karoline de Souza
- (Croatia) Sonja Bašić
- (Montenegro) Sandra Nikčević
- (North Macedonia) Marija Shteriova
- (Serbia) Marija Stefanovic

=== Left wings ===
- (Hungary) Krisztina Szádvári
- (Hungary) Virág Vaszari
- (Hungary) Erika Kirsner
- (Hungary) Karola Klász
- (Hungary) Szidónia Puhalák
- (Hungary) Kitti Gróz
- (Hungary) Krisztina Hajdu
- (Hungary) Beatrix Simut
- (Hungary) Szilvia Gerstmár
- (Hungary) Éva Szentes
- (Romania) Diana Pătru
- (Serbia) Sanja Radosavljević

=== Others ===
- (Hungary) Ildikó Lázár
- (Hungary) Ágnes Spargl
- (Hungary) Györgyi Sulyánszki
- (Serbia) Sladjana Mitrovic

== Coaches ==
- (Hungary) Dezső Sulyánszki
- (Hungary) László Fábián (1998–1999)
- (Hungary) Tibor Páll (1999–2002)
- (Hungary) János Hajdu (2002–2003, 2005)
- (Hungary) József Vura (2003–2005)
- (Hungary) Gusztáv Majoros (2005–2006)
- (Hungary) József Kenyeres (2006–2009)
- (Hungary) József Nyári (2009)
- (Hungary) András Németh (2009–2011)
- (Hungary) Csaba Ökrös (2011–2012)
- (Hungary) István Gulyás (2012–2013)
- (Hungary) Csaba Konkoly (2013–2014)
- (Hungary) Katalin Ottó (2014–2015, 2016, 2021–2022)
- (Slovenia) Uros Bregar (2015–2016)
- (Hungary) Zoltán Szilágyi (2016–2021)
- (Hungary) Beáta Őze (2021)
- (Hungary) Gábor Herbert (2022–2024)
- (Hungary) Roland Horváth (2024–present)
- (Hungary) László György (2026–)
