= Emese Mózes-Rácz =

Hungarian handball player (born 1983)

Personal information
- Full name: Emese Mózes-Rácz
- Nationality: Hungarian
- Born: 16 March 1983 (age 43) Debrecen, Hungary
- Height: 1.77 m (5 ft 10 in)

Sport
- Sport: Handball
- Position: Playmaker
- Current club: Retired

Senior clubs
- Years: Team
- 1999–2007: DVSC
- 2007–2008: Derecske KK
- 2008–2011: Békéscsabai ENKSE

Emese Mózes-Rácz (born 16 March 1983 in Debrecen) is a former Hungarian handballer. She retired from professional handball in 2011, when she gave birth to her first child. Alongside with her family, she moved to Twyford, Berkshire, United Kingdom. She returned to handball on amateur level and helped a British team, the Reading Lionesses, with her experience to win the second division.

== Achievements ==
- Magyar Kupa:
  - Silver Medallist: 2003
  - Bronze Medallist: 2010
- EHF Cup:
  - Semifinalist: 2006
- Youth European Championship:
  - Bronze Medallist: 2003
- World University Championship:
  - Silver Medallist: 2006
