= Nikolett Diószegi =

Hungarian handballer (born 1996)

Personal information
- Nationality: Hungarian
- Born: 31 March 1996 (age 30) Békéscsaba, Hungary
- Height: 1.74 m (5 ft 9 in)

Sport
- Sport: Handball
- Position: Right wing
- Current club: Váci NKSE
- Number: 99

Senior clubs
- Years: Team
- 2013–2017: Békéscsabai ENKSE
- 2017–2023: Váci NKSE

Nikolett Diószegi (born 31 March 1996) is a Hungarian handballer who plays for Váci NKSE.
