= Lehnice =

Lehnice Lég
- Municipality
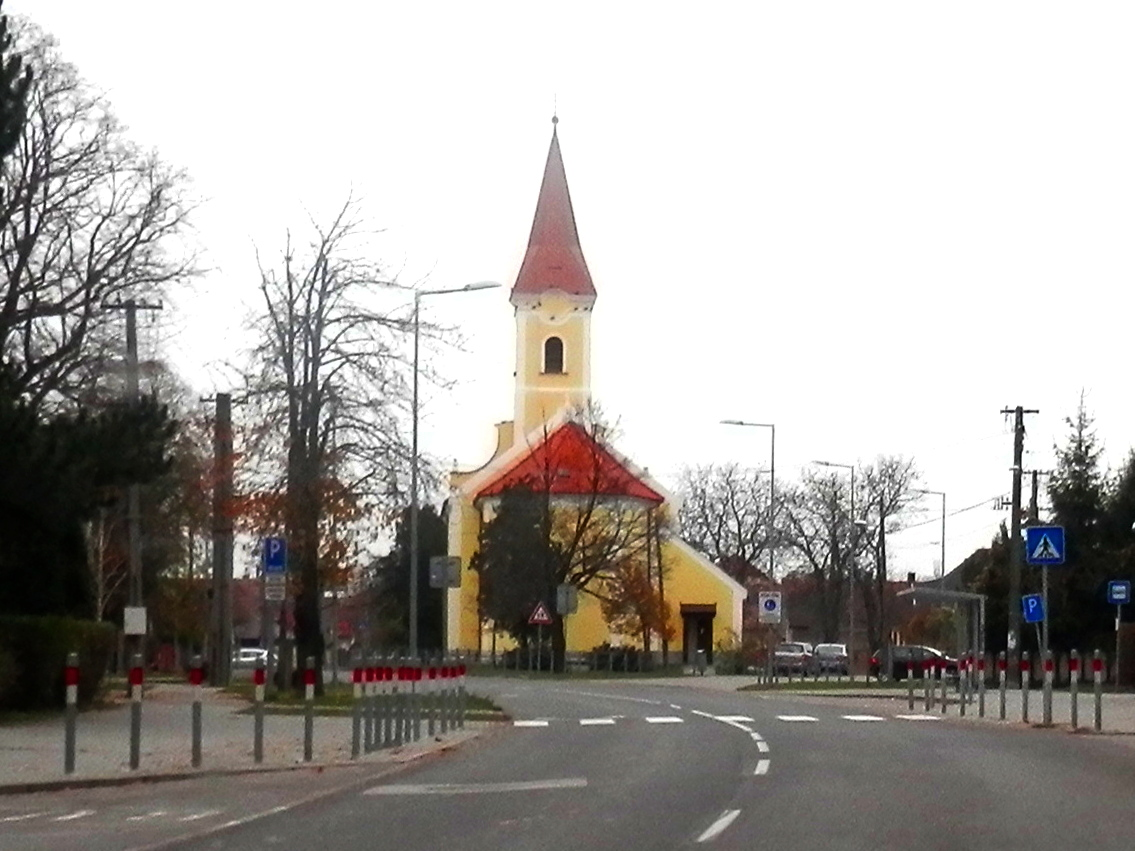

- Flag

- Location of Lehnice in the Trnava Region Location of Lehnice in Slovakia
- Coordinates: 48.05°N 17.46°E
- Country: Slovakia
- Region: Trnava Region
- District: Dunajská Streda District
- First mentioned: 1239

Government
  - Mayor: Ferenc Szitási (SDKÚ-DS)

Area
  - Total: 25.38 km^{2} (9.80 sq mi)
- Elevation: 121 m (397 ft)

Population (2025)
  - Total: 3,413

Ethnicity
  - Hungarians: 68.87%
  - Slovaks: 26.86%
- Time zone: UTC+1 (CET)
  - Summer (DST): UTC+2 (CEST)
- Postal code: 930 37
- Area code: +421 31
- Vehicle registration plate (until 2022): DS
- Website: www.obeclehnice.sk

Lehnice (Hungarian: Lég, pronounced [ˈleːɡ]; German: Legendorf) is a village and municipality in the Dunajská Streda District in the Trnava Region of south-west Slovakia.

== Component villages ==
In Slovak	In Hungarian	Year of attachment
Sása	Szász	1940
Malý Lég	Kislég	1940
Veľký Lég	Nagylég	1940
Masníkovo	Előpatony	1960
Kolónia		

== Geography ==
The municipality lies at an altitude of 121 metres (397 ft) and covers an area of 25.38 km^{2} (9.80 sq mi) (2025).

== History ==
In the 9th century, the territory of Lehnice became part of the Kingdom of Hungary. The name of the municipality was first recorded in 1239 by its Hungarian name as Legu. Until the end of World War I, all the present-day component villages of the municipality were part of Hungary and fell within the Somorja district of Pozsony County. After the Austro-Hungarian army disintegrated in November 1918, Czechoslovak troops occupied the area. After the Treaty of Trianon of 1920, the area became officially part of Czechoslovakia. In November 1938, the First Vienna Award granted the area to Hungary and it was held by Hungary until 1945. In 1940, three neighboring villages were unified to form Lég municipality. After Soviet occupation in 1945, Czechoslovak administration returned and the village became officially part of Czechoslovakia in 1947. In 1960, Masníkovo (Előpatony) was also attached to the municipality.

== Population ==
Population statistic (10 years)
Year	1995	2005	2015	2025
Count	2264	2427	2587	3413
Difference		+7.19%	+6.59%	+31.92%

Population statistic
Year	2024	2025
Count	3323	3413
Difference		+2.70%

It has a population of 3413 people (31 December 2025).

=== Ethnicity ===
Census 2021 (1+ %)
Ethnicity	Number	Fraction
Slovak	1463	49.34%
Hungarian	1449	48.87%
Not found out	149	5.02%
Romani	47	1.58%
Total	2965	

In year 2021 was 2965 people by ethnicity 1463 as Slovak, 1449 as Hungarian, 149 as Not found out, 47 as Romani, 17 as Czech, 10 as Other, 5 as Rusyn, 5 as Russian, 2 as Jewish, 2 as Serbian, 2 as German, 2 as English, 1 as Vietnamese and 1 as Ukrainian.

Note on population: The difference values of population numbers in the table "Population statistic" and in the sections "Ethnicity" & "Religion" is caused by the use of various statistical methods.

=== Religion ===
Census 2021 (1+ %)
Religion	Number	Fraction
Roman Catholic Church	1944	65.56%
None	710	23.95%
Not found out	115	3.88%
Calvinist Church	47	1.59%
Greek Catholic Church	42	1.42%
Evangelical Church	40	1.35%
Total	2965	

In year 2021 was 2965 people by religion 1944 from Roman Catholic Church, 710 from None, 115 from Not found out, 47 from Calvinist Church, 42 from Greek Catholic Church, 40 from Evangelical Church, 18 from Christian Congregations in Slovakia, 10 from Eastern Orthodox Church, 9 from Other, 8 from Other and not ascertained christian church, 6 from Ad hoc movements, 5 from Buddhism, 4 from Jehovah's Witnesses, 2 from Old Catholic Church, 1 from Jewish community, 1 from Paganism and natural spirituality, 1 from United Methodist Church, 1 from Baptists Church and 1 from Apostolic Church.

At the 2001 Census the recorded population of the village was 2409 while an end-2008 estimate by the Statistical Office had the villages's population as 2540. As of 2001, 68.87% of its population (1659 residents) were Hungarians while 26.86% (647 residents) were Slovaks. Roman Catholicism is the majority religion of the village, its adherents numbering 87.26% of the total population.

== Twinnings ==
The village is twinned with:

- Répcelak, Hungary
