= Judit Veszeli =

Hungarian handball player (born 1978)

Personal information
- Full name: Judit Veszeli
- Nationality: Hungarian
- Born: 3 March 1978 (age 48) Budapest, Hungary
- Height: 1.86 m (6 ft 1 in)

Sport
- Sport: Handball
- Position: Left Back
- Current club: —

Senior clubs
- Years: Team
- –1998: Ferencvárosi TC
- 1998–2001: Váci NKSE
- 2001–2002: Randers HK
- 2002–2004: Esztergomi KSE
- 2004–2005: Budapesti Spartacus SC
- 2005–2009: Váci NKSE
- 2009–2011: Veszprém Barabás KC

Judit Veszeli (born 3 March 1978 in Budapest) is a retired Hungarian team handball player, who was the top scorer of the Hungarian top division in the 2006–2007 season.

== Achievements ==
- Nemzeti Bajnokság I:
  - Bronze Medalist: 1998
- Magyar Kupa:
  - Bronze Medalist: 2003

== Awards ==
- Nemzeti Bajnokság I Top Scorer: 2007
