= Zsuzsanna Veress =

Hungarian handball player (born 1976)

Personal information
- Full name: Zsuzsanna Veress
- Nationality: Hungarian
- Born: 6 March 1976 (age 50) Békéscsaba, Hungary
- Height: 1.80 m (5 ft 11 in)

Sport
- Sport: Handball
- Position: Goalkeeper
- Current club: Retired

Senior clubs
- Years: Team
- –1997: Medgyesegyháza SE
- 1997–2003: Pécsi EAC
- 2003–2004: ŽRK Ljubuški
- 2004–2015: Békéscsabai ENKSE

Zsuzsanna Veress (born 6 March 1976 in Békéscsaba) is a former Hungarian handball goalkeeper who most recently played for Békéscsabai Előre NKSE.

== Achievements ==
- Magyar Kupa:
  - Silver Medalist: 2012
  - Bronze Medalist: 2010
