= Jéssica Ferreira =

Portuguese handball player (born 1996)

Personal information
- Full name: Jéssica Romina Vargas Ferreira
- Nationality: Portuguese
- Born: 11 October 1996 (age 30) Funchal, Portugal
- Height: 1.73 m (5 ft 8 in)

Sport
- Sport: Handball
- Position: Goalkeeper
- Current club: Békéscsabai Előre NKSE
- Number: 16

Senior clubs
- Years: Team
- 2013–2014: C.S. Madeira
- 2014–2018: Colégio de Gaia
- 2018–2024: Handball Clermont Auvergne Métropole 63
- 2024–2025: Békéscsabai Előre NKSE
National team
Years	Team	Apps	(Gls)
2020–	Portugal	63	(2)

Jéssica Romina Vargas Ferreira (born 11 October 1996) is a Portuguese handball player for Békéscsabai Előre NKSE and the Portuguese national team. In May 2024, she signed a two-year contract with Békéscsabai Előre NKSE after four years in France.

She represented Portugal at the 2024 European Women's Handball Championship.
