= 2018–19 Magyar Kupa (women's handball) =

Hungarian women's handball season

Tournament details
- Country: Hungary
- Dates: 7 September 2018 – 17 March 2019
- Teams: 45

Final positions
- Champions: Győri Audi ETO KC (14th title)
- Runners-up: FTC-Rail Cargo Hungaria
- Third place: Érd
- Fourth place: Dunaújvárosi Kohász KA

Tournament statistics
- Matches played: 41 + 4 (Final four)

Awards
- Best player: (Netherlands) Nycke Groot

The 2018–19 Magyar Kupa, known as (Hungarian: TippMix Török Bódog női Magyar Kupa) for sponsorship reasons, was the 61st edition of the tournament.

== Schedule ==
The rounds of the 2018–19 competition are scheduled as follows:

Round	Draw date and time	Matches	Number of fixtures	Clubs	New entries this round
Round I	2 August 2018, 13:00 CEST	12 September 2018	15	30 → 15	30
Round II	18 September 2018, 11:00 CEST	3 October 2018	8	16 → 8	1
Round III	9 October 2018, 11:00 CEST	25 October 2018	8	16 → 8	8
Round IV	30 October 2018, 11:00 CET	14 November 2018	6	12 → 6	4
Round V	20 November 2018, 11:00 CET	13 February 2019	4	8 → 4	2
Final four	19 February 2019, 11:00 CET	16–17 March 2019	4	4 → 1	none

== Matches ==
A total of 45 matches took place, starting with First round on 7 September 2018 and culminating with the Final on 17 March 2019.

=== First round ===
The first round ties was scheduled for 7–12 September 2018.

Team 1	Score	Team 2
7 September
Szombathelyi Haladás (I/B)	12–37	Szombathelyi KKA (I/B)
Vecsés SE (II)	21–45	Szentendrei NKE (I/B)
8 September
Gyomaendrődi NKSE (II)	16–44	Kecskeméti NKSE (I/B)
11 September
Szekszárdi FGKC (I/B)	26–24	NEKA (I/B)
Büki TK (II)	33–31	Gárdony-Pázmánd NKSE (I/B)
Hódmezővásárhelyi LKC (II)	23–40	Oxxo Energy-Orosházi NKC (I/B)
VSK Tököl (II)	21–25	Dorogi ESE (I/B)
12 September
EURO-NOVEX USE (II)	19–36	Nyíradony VVTK (I/B)
Rinyamenti KC (I/B)	27–31	Kozármisleny SE (I/B)
Marcali VSZSE (II)	19–30	Mohácsi TE 1888 (I/B)
Bugyi SE (Count. I)	10–43	Vasas SC (I/B)
Csepel DSE (II)	15–42	Szent István SE-OTP Bank (I/B)
Kispest NKK-Endo +Service (I/B)	29–27	Pénzügyőr SE (I/B)
NKK Balmazújváros (I/B)	23–28	Hajdúnánás SK (I/B)
Levendula Hotel FKSE-Algyő (II)	27–24	PC Trade Szeged KKSE (I/B)

=== Second round ===
The second round ties was scheduled for 27 September – 3 October 2018.

Team 1	Score	Team 2
27 September
Nyíradony VVTK (I/B)	36–27	Levendula Hotel FKSE-Algyő (I/B)
Szekszárdi FGKC (I/B)	24–26	Kozármisleny SE (I/B)
28 September
Büki TK (II)	17–38	Vasas SC (I/B)
Szentendrei NKE (I/B)	23–33	Szombathelyi KKA (I/B)
2 October
Mohácsi TE 1888 (I/B)	31–28	Dorogi ESE (I/B)
Oxxo Energy-Orosházi NKC (I/B)	26–29	Kecskeméti NKSE (I/B)
3 October
Hajdúnánás SK (I/B)	22–27	Gödi SE (I/B)
Szent István SE-OTP Bank (I/B)	40–27	Kispest NKK-Endo +Service (I/B)

=== Third round ===
The third round ties was scheduled for 17–24 October 2018.

Team 1	Score	Team 2
17 October
Mohácsi TE 1888 (I/B)	19–28	Eu-Fire Mosonmagyaróvár (I)
Szent István SE-OTP Bank (I/B)	26–38	Kisvárda Master Good SE (I)
22 October
Eszterházy SC (I)	20–31	DVSC-SCHAEFFLER (I)
24 October
Gödi SE (I/B)	28–31	Kecskeméti NKSE (I/B)
Szombathelyi KKA (I/B)	31–34	MTK Budapest (I)
Moyra-Budaörs Handball (I)	28–30	Alba Fehérvár KC (I)
Nyíradony VVTK (I/B)	25–39	EUbility Group-Békéscsaba (I)
Vasas SC (I/B)	26–28	Kozármisleny SE (I/B)

=== Fourth round ===
The fourth round ties was scheduled for 6–14 November 2018.

Team 1	Score	Team 2
6 November
Kecskeméti NKSE (I/B)	27–31	EUbility Group-Békéscsaba (I)
7 November
Kozármisleny SE (I/B)	23–47	GVM Europe-Vác (I)
8 November
Eu-Fire Mosonmagyaróvár (I)	29–23	Alba Fehérvár KC (I)
13 November
Érd (I)	27–26	DVSC-SCHAEFFLER (I)
14 November
Dunaújvárosi Kohász KA (I)	27–22	Siófok KC (I)
MTK Budapest (I)	28–34	Kisvárda Master Good SE (I)

=== Fifth round ===
The fifth round ties was scheduled for 8–13 February 2019.

Team 1	Score	Team 2
8 February
Dunaújvárosi Kohász KA (I)	35–25	EUbility Group-Békéscsaba (I)
9 February
Érd (I)	29–21	Kisvárda Master Good SE (I)
13 February
Győri Audi ETO KC (I)	35–25	Eu-Fire Mosonmagyaróvár (I)
GVM Europe-Vác (I)	27–31	FTC-Rail Cargo Hungaria (I)

== Final four ==
The final four will be held on 16–17 March 2019 at the Főnix Hall in Debrecen.

Semi-finals
16 March, 13:00
Dunaújvárosi Kohász KA	26
FTC-Rail Cargo Hungaria	33
16 March, 15:15
Érd	26
Győri Audi ETO KC	39

Final
17 March, 18:00
FTC-Rail Cargo Hungaria	29
Győri Audi ETO KC	32
Bronze medal match
17 March, 15:45
Dunaújvárosi Kohász KA	23
Érd	31

=== Awards ===
- Most valuable player: (Netherlands) Nycke Groot
- Best Goalkeeper: ?

=== Semi-finals ===
16 March 2018; 13:00 (CET)	Dunaújvárosi Kohász KA	23 – 31	FTC-Rail Cargo Hungaria	Főnix Hall, Debrecen; Attendance: 3,000; Referees: Felhő, Öcsi
16 March 2018; 13:00 (CET)	Sirián 8	(11–17)	Klujber 7	Főnix Hall, Debrecen; Attendance: 3,000; Referees: Felhő, Öcsi
16 March 2018; 13:00 (CET)	3× (yellow card) 4× (suspension) 2× (red card)	Report	3× (yellow card) 3× (suspension)	Főnix Hall, Debrecen; Attendance: 3,000; Referees: Felhő, Öcsi

16 March 2019; 15:15 (CET)	Érd	26 – 39	Győri Audi ETO KC	Főnix Hall, Debrecen; Attendance: 3,200; Referees: Paska, Vastag
16 March 2019; 15:15 (CET)	Jeřábková 7	(15–20)	Hansen, Amorim 5	Főnix Hall, Debrecen; Attendance: 3,200; Referees: Paska, Vastag
16 March 2019; 15:15 (CET)	2× (yellow card) 3× (suspension)	Report	2× (yellow card) 3× (suspension)	Főnix Hall, Debrecen; Attendance: 3,200; Referees: Paska, Vastag

=== Bronze medal match ===
17 March 2019; 15:45 (CET)	Dunaújvárosi Kohász KA	23 – 31	Érd	Főnix Hall, Debrecen; Attendance: 3,000; Referees: Marton, Szabó
17 March 2019; 15:45 (CET)	Szalai 8	(12–13)	Lavko 6	Főnix Hall, Debrecen; Attendance: 3,000; Referees: Marton, Szabó
17 March 2019; 15:45 (CET)	2× (yellow card) 6× (suspension) 1× (red card)	Report	1× (yellow card) 9× (suspension) 1× (red card)	Főnix Hall, Debrecen; Attendance: 3,000; Referees: Marton, Szabó

=== Final ===
16 March 2019; 18:00 (CET)	FTC-Rail Cargo Hungaria	29 – 32	Győri Audi ETO KC	Főnix Hall, Debrecen; Attendance: 5,000; Referees: Horváth, Marton
16 March 2019; 18:00 (CET)	Pena 7	(11–18)	Groot 8	Főnix Hall, Debrecen; Attendance: 5,000; Referees: Horváth, Marton
16 March 2019; 18:00 (CET)	2× (yellow card) 2× (suspension)	Report	3× (yellow card) 4× (suspension)	Főnix Hall, Debrecen; Attendance: 5,000; Referees: Horváth, Marton

==== Final standings ====
	Team
	Győri Audi ETO KC
Silver medal	FTC-Rail Cargo Hungaria
Bronze medal	Érd
	Dunaújvárosi Kohász KA

2018–19 Magyar Kupa
Winner

Győri Audi ETO KC
14th title

Grimsbø, É. Kiss, Leynaud (goalkeepers), Afentaler, Amorim, Bódi, Brattset, Görbicz (c),
Groot, Hansen, Knedlíková, Kristiansen, Oftedal, Pintea, Puhalák, Tomori
Head coach: Gábor Danyi, Assistant coach: Zdravko Zovko

== See also ==
- 2018–19 Nemzeti Bajnokság I
- 2018–19 Nemzeti Bajnokság I/B
- 2018–19 Nemzeti Bajnokság II
