= Kitti Gróz =

Hungarian handball player (born 1994)

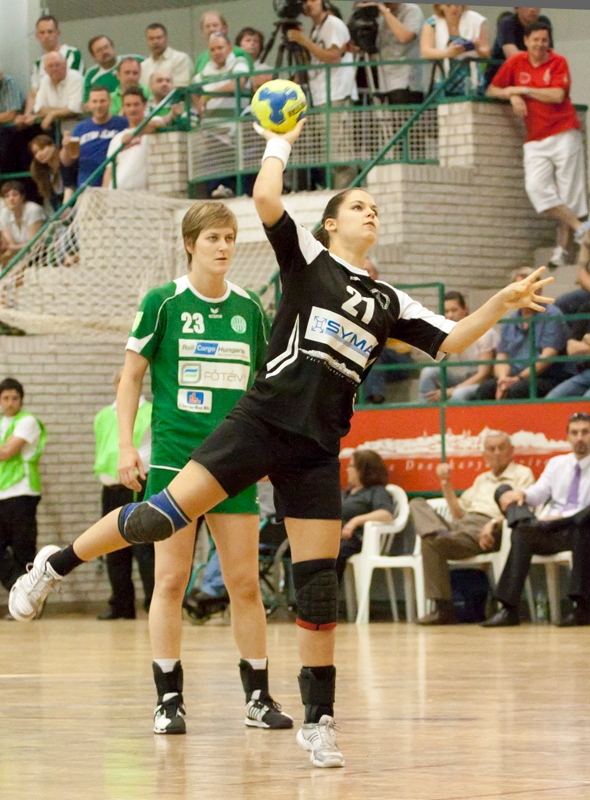

Personal information
- Full name: Kitti Gróz
- Nationality: Hungarian
- Born: 5 April 1994 (age 32) Budapest, Hungary
- Height: 1.71 m (5 ft 7 1/2 in)

Sport
- Sport: Handball
- Position: Left Wing
- Current club: Retired

Senior clubs
- Years: Team
- –2010: Szentendrei NKE
- 2010–2015: Váci NKSE
- loan: → Szentendrei NKE
- 2015–2019: Szentendrei NKE

Kitti Gróz (born 5 April 1994 in Budapest) is a retired Hungarian team handball and beach handball player.

== Team handball career ==
Gróz started to play handball at the age of six and her first club was Szentendrei NKE. She rose through the ranks quickly and at the end of the 2009–10 season she finished seventh on the scoring chart in the second division, hitting an impressive 7.74 goals in average (122 goals on 23 matches). As a result, many club were interested in signing the talented left winger. Váci NKSE, a parent club of Szentendrei NKE, signed her.

== Beach handball career ==
Gróz is a beach handball player as well. In 2008, she participated on the first ever Youth European Beach Handball Championship that was held in Nagyatád, and led the Hungarian team to win the title on home soil. She has won the top scorer award and was voted for MVP thus making her prize collection complete.

One year later, she played for the adult team that finished sixth on the 2009 European Beach Handball Championship. Gróz topped the scoring charts with 111 points.

In 2011, she was present on the Youth European Beach Handball Championship again, and repeated her former success both on team and personal level: Hungary went undefeated to win the tournament, while Gróz won both the top scorer award and the MVP title. On the following week was held the adult's competition, for that Gróz was selected as well. She was an important piece of the Hungarian team, which finished fifth. Gróz scored 153 points on the tournament, more than any other players, and was awarded the top scorer's prize.

== Personal ==
Her father, János Gróz coached her while at Szentendrei NKE, and he was also the coach of the Hungarian women's beach handball national team.

== Achievements ==
- European Beach Handball Championship:
  - Winner: 2013
- Youth European Beach Handball Championship:
  - Winner: 2008, 2011

== Individual awards ==
- MVP of the European Beach Handball Championship: 2013
- MVP of the Youth European Beach Handball Championship: 2008, 2011
- Youth European Beach Handball Championship Top Scorer: 2008, 2011
- European Beach Handball Championship Top Scorer: 2009, 2011
- Hungarian Beach Handballer of the Year: 2011
