= Tímea Szögi =

Hungarian handball player (born 1990)

Personal information
- Full name: Tímea Szögi
- Nationality: Hungarian
- Born: 20 February 1990 (age 36) Szeged, Hungary
- Height: 1.72 m (5 ft 8 in)

Sport
- Sport: Handball
- Position: Playmaker
- Current club: Békéscsabai ENKSE
- Number: 11

Senior clubs
- Years: Team
- 2007–2020; 2021–2022: Békéscsabai ENKSE
Medal record
Women's 19 European Championship
| Silver medal – second place | 2009 Hungary | Team |

Tímea Szögi (born 20 February 1990 in Szeged) is a retired Hungarian handballer who played as a playmaker.

Szögi joined the club in 2007 and was member of the team that finished fourth in the Hungarian Championship in 2009 and 2010. She also played in Békéscsaba's Hungarian Cup campaign in 2010, when they eventually finished third and collected the bronze medal.

Tímea represented Hungary starting from younger age categories and was one of the playmakers who led the national team to the Women's 19 European Championship silver medal in 2009 on home soil. In September 2010 she gave birth to a baby and returned into action in the spring of following year.

== Achievements ==
- Magyar Kupa:
  - Silver Medalist: 2012
  - Bronze Medalist: 2010
- Women's 19 European Championship:
  - Silver Medalist: 2009
