= Marina Razum =

Croatian handball player (born 1992)

Personal information
- Nationality: Croatian
- Born: 25 February 1992 (age 34) Zagreb, Croatia
- Height: 1.80 m (5 ft 11 in)

Sport
- Sport: Handball
- Position: Goalkeeper
- Current club: Békéscsabai Előre NKSE
- Number: 1
National team
Years	Team	Apps	(Gls)
–	Croatia	18	(0)

Marina Razum (born 25 February 1992) is a Croatian handball player for Békéscsabai Előre NKSE and the Croatian national team.

She participated at the 2016 European Women's Handball Championship.
