= Katalin Zsilák =

Hungarian handball player (born 1989)

Personal information
- Full name: Katalin Zsilák
- Nationality: Hungarian
- Born: 15 September 1989 (age 37) Békéscsaba, Hungary
- Height: 1.71 m (5 ft 7 in)

Sport
- Sport: Handball
- Position: Right Wing
- Current club: Levendula Hotel FKSE-Algyő
- Number: 15

Senior clubs
- Years: Team
- 2007–2014: Békéscsabai ENKSE
- 2014-2017: PC TRADE Szeged KKSE
- 2017: HUFBAU-AKKER Kecskeméti NKSE
- 2017-2018: Oxxo Energy Orosházi NKC
- 2018-present: Levendula Hotel FKSE-Algyő

Katalin Zsilák (born 15 September 1989 in Békéscsaba) is a Hungarian handballer who plays for Békéscsabai Előre NKSE in right wing position.

== Achievements ==
- Magyar Kupa:
  - Silver Medalist: 2012
  - Bronze Medalist: 2010
