= János Gróz =

Hungarian handball coach (1971–2020)

János Gróz (30 June 1971 – 14 November 2020) was a Hungarian handball and beach handball coach. He was one of the most successful trainers in Hungary in the beach version of the sport.

== Biography ==
János Gróz was one of the founding fathers and was considered the dominant personality in Hungarian beach handball. From 2007 he was the head coach of the Hungarian youth and junior national teams. With these he won the titles at the European Championships in 2008 and 2011 to 2015. In 2013, he also took over the Hungary women's national beach handball team from József Farkas, where he was previously assistant coach from 2009 to 2012. His assistant coach was his former player Mariann Rovnyai, with whom he had been married since 2007. With the team he won the titles at the European Beach Handball Championships in 2013 and 2015. He also won the silver medals with the Hungarians at the 2013 World Games and the 2014 Beach Handball World Championships and was fourth in the 2016 Beach Handball World Championships. From 2017, Bakó Botond held the head coach position.

In addition, Gróz was the coach of the indoor second division team Szentendrei NKE and its beach handball team. With the team that he built up to become the top Hungarian team, he won the Hungarian beach handball championship four times in a row in 2012 and from 2015 to 2018 and again in 2020. Within nine years he won with the team, including Bozsana Fekete, his daughter Kitti Gróz, Ágnes Győri, Fruzsina Kretz, Mariann Rovnyai, Emese Tóth, Nóra Leila Bozsó, Renáta Csiki, Fanni Friebesz, Viktória Vígh, Adrienn Zsigmond, Ágnes Kókai, Rebeka Benzsay, Csenge Braun, Sára Léránt and Ramóna Vártok. With the team, Gróz also achieved international success. In 2015, 2016 and 2018 he won the European Beach Handball Tour with Szentendrei NKE, in 2015 and 2018 the Champions Cup. At the Champions Cup he was second with Szentendrei in 2016 and 2019 and third in 2017.

Gróz died from complications from COVID-19 in November 2020, at the age of 49. He lived in Szentendre.
