= 2018–19 Nemzeti Bajnokság I/B (women's handball) =

NB I/B női felnőtt
- Season: 2018–19
- Promoted: Szent István SE-OTP Bank (East); Szombathelyi KKA (West)
- Matches played: 132 (East), 132 (West)
- Top goalscorer: Edina Szabó 157 goals (East); Dorina Kovács 172 goals (West)

The 2018–19 Nemzeti Bajnokság I/B is the 51st season of the Nemzeti Bajnokság I/B, Hungary's second tier Handball league.

== Team information ==
There are 12–12 clubs in the 2 group, with three-three promoted teams from Nemzeti Bajnokság II.

=== Team changes ===
Promoted from 2017–18 Nemzeti Bajnokság II

- Dorogi ESE (North)
- FKSE Algyő (South-east)

Relegated from 2017–18 Nemzeti Bajnokság I

- Kecskeméti NKSE
- Vasas SC

Relegated to 2018–19 Nemzeti Bajnokság II

- Pilisvörösvári KSK
- Csurgói NKC (South-west)
- Marcali VSZSE (South-west)
- VKL SE Győr (North-west)
- Hódmezővásárhelyi LKC (South-east)
- K. Szeged SE (South-east)
- Gyömrő VSK (South)

Promoted to 2018–19 Nemzeti Bajnokság I

- Mosonmagyaróvári KC SE
- Eszterházy KESC

=== Arenas and locations ===
Location of teams in 2018-19 Nemzeti Bajnokság I/B (West)
Location of teams in 2018-19 Nemzeti Bajnokság I/B (East)

==== Western Group ====
The following 12 clubs compete in the NB I/B (Western) during the 2018–19 season:

Team	Location	Arena
Dorogi ESE	Dorog	Eötvös József Gimnázium
Dunaújvárosi Kohász KA (U19)	Dunaújváros	Városi Sportcsarnok
Győri ETO KC (U19)	Győr	Audi Aréna
Kozármisleny SE	Kozármisleny	Városi Sportcsarnok
Mohácsi TE	Mohács	Városi Sportcsarnok
NEKA	Balatonboglár	Urányi János Sportcsarnok
Pázmánd NKSE	Gárdony	Ált. Isk. Sportcsarnok
Pénzügyőr SE	Budapest, X. ker	Pénzügyőr Sportcsarnok
Rinyamenti KC	Nagyatád	Városi Sportcsarnok
Szekszárdi FGKC	Szekszárd	Városi Sportcsarnok
Szombathelyi Haladás	Szombathely	Haladás Sportkomplexum
Szombathelyi KKA	Szombathely	Egyetemi Sportcsarnok

==== Eastern Group ====
The following 12 clubs compete in the NB I/B (Eastern) during the 2017–18 season:

Team	Location	Arena
FKSE Algyő	Algyő	Fehér Ignác Ált. Isk.
NKK Balmazújváros	Balmazújváros	Kőnig Rendezvényközpont
Gödi SE	Göd	Balázsovits János spcs.
Hajdúnánás SK	Hajdúnánás	Somorjai László Sportcsarnok
Kecskeméti NKSE	Kecskemét	Messzi István Sportcsarnok
Kispest NKK	Budapest, XIX. ker	Soroksári Sportcsarnok
Nyíradony VVTK	Nyíradony	Városi Sportcsarnok
Orosházi NKC	Orosháza	Eötvös Sportcsarnok
Szeged KKSE	Szeged	Városi Sportcsarnok
Szent István SE	Budapest, IX. ker	Építők Sportcsarnok
Szentendrei NKE	Szentendre	Móricz Zsigmond Gimnázium
Vasas SC	Budapest, XIII. ker	Elektromos csarnok

== See also ==
- 2018–19 Magyar Kupa
- 2018–19 Nemzeti Bajnokság I
- 2018–19 Nemzeti Bajnokság II
