= Ágnes Triffa =

Hungarian handball player (born 1987)

Personal information
- Nationality: Hungarian
- Born: 18 January 1987 (age 39) Gyula, Hungary
- Height: 1.76 m (5 ft 9 in)

Sport
- Sport: Handball
- Position: Goalkeeper

Senior clubs
- Years: Team
- 2002–2004: Békéscsabai ENKSE
- 2004–2007: Vasas SC
- 2007–2008: Debreceni VSC
- 2008–2009: RK Krim Ljubljana
- 2009–2011: Debreceni VSC
- 2012: UKSE Szekszárd
- 2012–2014: Váci NKSE
- 2014–2016: Dunaújvárosi KKA
- 2016–2017: Békéscsabai ENKSE
- 2017–2018: Kisvárdai KC
- 2018–2020: Debreceni VSC
- 2020–2021: Váci NKSE
National team
Years	Team	Apps	(Gls)
2006–2019	Hungary	37	(0)
- Updated on 9 December 2019

Ágnes Triffa (born 18 January 1987) is a former Hungarian handball goalkeeper for the Hungarian national team.

She made her international debut on 2 June 2006 against Argentina, and took part on the World Championship in 2009.

== Achievements ==
- Nemzeti Bajnokság I:
  - Runner-up: 2010, 2011
- Magyar Kupa:
  - Silver Medalist: 2011
  - Bronze Medalist: 2008
- Slovenian National Championship:
  - Winner: 2009
- Slovenian Cup:
  - Winner: 2009
- EHF Cup
  - Winner: 2016
