= Éva Vantara-Kelemen =

Hungarian handball player (born 1987)

Personal information
- Full name: Éva Vantara-Kelemen
- Nationality: Hungarian
- Born: 27 December 1987 (age 38) Szeghalom, Hungary
- Height: 1.67 m (5 ft 6 in)

Sport
- Sport: Handball
- Position: Left Wing
- Current club: Debreceni VSC
- Number: 17

Youth career
- Years: Team
- –2000: Füzesgyarmat SE
- 2000–2004: Békéscsabai ENKSE

Senior clubs
- Years: Team
- 2004–2013: Békéscsabai ENKSE
- 2013–2021: Debreceni VSC

Éva Vantara-Kelemen (born 27 December 1987 in Szeghalom) is a Hungarian handballer who plays for Debreceni VSC as a left winger. She has also been selected for the Hungary women's national handball team

== Achievements ==
- Magyar Kupa:
  - Silver Medalist: 2012
  - Bronze Medalist: 2010
