= Csaba Ökrös =

Hungarian handball player and coach (born 1969)

Csaba Ökrös (born May 26, 1969, in Debrecen) is a Hungarian handball player, coach and university professor. Currently, Ökrös serves as the head coach of Váci NKSE, having taken the position from András Németh who re-joined his former club Hypo Niederösterreich in the autumn of 2011.

Formerly, Ökrös worked for Testnevelési Főiskola SE, Dunaferr SE, Everyday Orosháza and PLER KC. He also managed the Hungarian national team in younger age categories and led the national team of university and college students.

== Achievements ==
- Nemzeti Bajnokság I:
  - Bronze Medalist: 2002
- Magyar Kupa:
  - Bronze Medalist: 2002
- EHF Cup Winners' Cup:
  - Semifinalist: 2002
- University World Championship:
  - Winner: 2000
  - Silver Medalist: 1998
