= Gábor Danyi =

Hungarian handball player and coach (born 1964)

Personal information
- Nationality: Hungarian
- Born: 18 February 1964 (age 62) Pécs, Hungary

Sport
- Sport: Handball
- Position: Centre back

Senior clubs
- Years: Team
- 1987–1992: PEAC Pécs
- 1992–1996: Szigetvár

Teams managed
- 1987–1991: Pécsi Tási
- 1991–1993: Pécsi MSC
- 1992–1996: Szigetvár
- 1997–2007: PEAC Pécs
- 2007–2011: Pécsi VSE
- 2011–2018: Győri ETO KC (assistant coach)
- 2018–2021: Győri ETO KC
- 2020–2021: Hungary (women) (assistant coach)
- 2021: Siófok KC
- 2022–2023: Fejér B.Á.L. Veszprém (assistant coach)
- 2023–2024: Fejér B.Á.L. Veszprém

Gábor Danyi (born 18 February 1964) is a Hungarian former handball player and coach. Besides his trainer certificate, he also has a teaching degree in geography and physical education.

He coached Hungary at the 2020 European Women's Handball Championship.

He is now the headcoach of NEKA.

== Career ==
In the summer of 2018, he replaced Ambros Martín as head coach of Győri ETO KC. In his very first season as the head coach, the team – beside winning all the trophies possible – remained unbeaten in the domestic competitions as well as in the Champions League.

He was nominated for the 2019 IHF World Coach of The Year award.

== Achievements ==
=== Coach ===
- EHF Champions League
  - Gold: 2019
- Nemzeti Bajnokság I
  - Gold: 2019
- Magyar Kupa
  - Gold: 2019
- Nemzeti Bajnokság I/B (men's)
  - Gold: 2009, 2010
- Nemzeti Bajnokság I/B (women's)
  - Gold: 2002, 2004
