= Tor Odvar Moen =

Norwegian handball coach

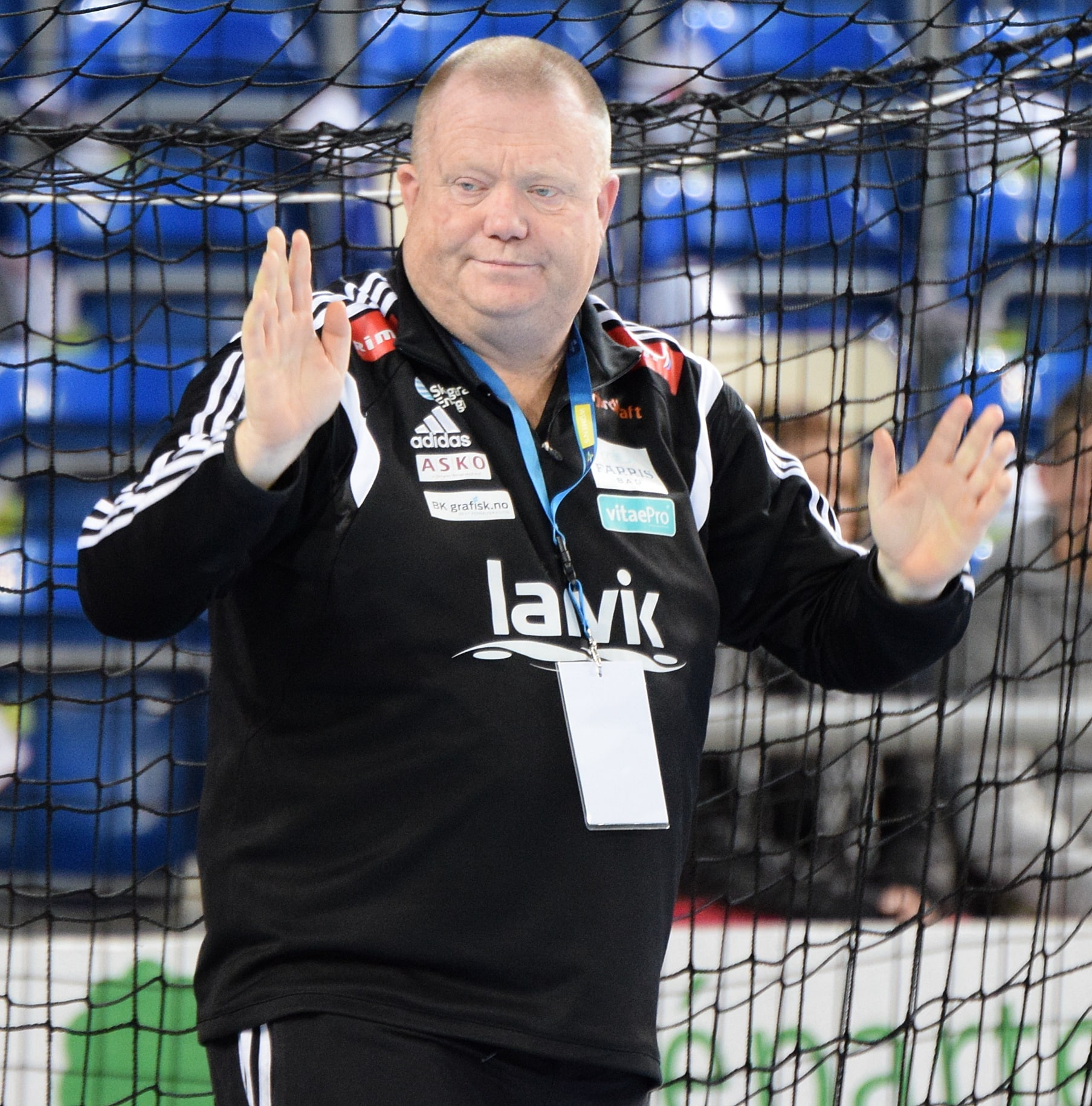
- Tor Odvar Moen (2014)

Personal information
- Nationality: Norwegian
- Born: 14 January 1965 (age 61)

Sport
- Sport: Handball
- Current club: Molde Elite; Czech Republic (Assistant coach)

Teams managed
- Years: Team
- –1997: IL Runar
- 2015–2018: Larvik HK
- 2018–2020: Siófok KC
- 2020–: Molde Elite
- 2023–: Czech Republic (Assistant coach)

Tor Odvar Moen (born 14 January 1965) is a Norwegian handball coach. He is currently head coach for Molde Elite and assistant coach of Czech women's national team.

Moen has been part of Larvik HK in different roles since 1997. It was announced on 21 January 2015 that Moen would take over as head coach of Larvik HK, succeeding former head coach Ole Gustav Gjekstad. He had previously been handball coach for IL Runar.

It was announced in March 2018 that Moen will be taking over the Hungarian team Siófok KC who is going hard for the top positions in the country and for play in the best European tournaments.

As a coach he has won the Norwegian championship eleven times, the Norwegian Handball Cup eleven times, the Norwegian championship playoffs eleven times, Cup Winners' Cup once and the Champions League once.
