= Répcelak =

- Flag Coat of arms

- Location of Vas county in Hungary

- Location of Répcelak
- Coordinates: 47.42105°N 17.01836°E
- Country: Hungary
- County: Vas

Area
  - Total: 13.82 km^{2} (5.34 sq mi)

Population (2015)
  - Total: 2,625
  - Density: 189.9/km^{2} (491.9/sq mi)
- Time zone: UTC+1 (CET)
  - Summer (DST): UTC+2 (CEST)
- Postal code: 9653
- Area code: 95
- Motorways: M86
- Distance from Budapest: 185 km (115 mi) East

Répcelak is a town in Vas county, Hungary. Répcelak name comes from river Répce.

== Twin towns — sister cities ==
Répcelak is twinned with:

- Lehnice, Slovakia
