= Erika Kirsner =

Hungarian handball player (born 1975)

Personal information
- Full name: Erika Kirsner
- Nationality: Hungarian
- Born: 23 December 1975 (age 50) Hódmezővásárhely, Hungary
- Height: 1.74 m (5 ft 9 in)

Sport
- Sport: Handball
- Position: Left Wing
- Current club: —

Senior clubs
- Years: Team
- 1992–1993: Alföldi Porcelán SK
- 1993–1995: Szegedi ESK
- 1995–1998: Kiskunhalasi NKSE
- 1998–1999: DVSC
- 1999–2007: Ferencvárosi TC
- 2007–2010: Hypo Niederösterreich
- 2010–2011: Váci NKSE
National team
Years	Team	Apps	(Gls)
2000–2008	Hungary	139	(372)
Medal record
World Championship
Silver medal – second place	2003 Croatia	Team
European Championship
Gold medal – first place	2000 Romania	Team

Erika Kirsner (born 23 December 1975 in Hódmezővásárhely) is a former Hungarian international handball player who currently serves as the president of Váci NKSE.

== Achievements ==
- Nemzeti Bajnokság I:
  - Winner: 2000, 2002, 2007
  - Silver Medalist: 2001, 2003, 2006
  - Bronze Medalist: 2004, 2005
- Magyar Kupa:
  - Winner: 2001, 2003
  - Silver Medalist: 2007
- Women Handball Austria:
  - Winner: 2008, 2009, 2010
- ÖHB Cup:
  - Winner: 2008, 2009, 2010
- EHF Champions League:
  - Finalist: 2002, 2008
  - Semifinalist: 2009
- EHF Cup:
  - Winner: 2006
- World Championship:
  - Silver Medalist: 2003
- European Championship:
  - Winner: 2000
