= Rail Cargo Austria =

Austrian rail freight transport company

Rail Cargo Group logo

Rail Cargo Austria (RCA) is an Austrian rail freight transportation company with its headquarters in Vienna. It was founded on 1 January 2005 as an independent company from the freight transport division of ÖBB.

== History and figures ==
During the late 1990s and early 2000s, a movement towards rail liberalisation gained traction across Europe, including in Austria. During 2001, operations of the first external railway undertakings on ÖBB's rail network commenced; within six years, the new railway operations had resulted in an increase of 500% in train kilometers traveled. ÖBB decided to spin out its freight operations as a separate entity with Rail Cargo Austria (RCA) established on 1 January 2005. RCA united the five business units Rail Cargo Logistics, Rail Cargo Operator, Rail Cargo Carrier, Rail Cargo Wagon and Maintenance (ÖBB-Technische Services) under the brand name Rail Cargo Group (RCG).

In concept, RCA operates on a competitive in a liberalised rail transport sector alongside numerous other market-oriented companies. Despite this perspective, from the onset of operations, RCA has collaborate closely with ÖBB and established agencies on matters of infrastructure, being particularly interested in measures to reduce or remove impediments to traffic across the Austrian rail network. The prevailing alpine geography present in Austria has long presented challenges to railway operations, necessitating close monitoring of weather conditions and preventative measures to safely operate and guard against potential damage from mountain torrents, avalanches and sheer rockfaces.

RCA quickly sought to expand its presence internationally, particularly in central and eastern Europe; this process was aided by the company already undertaking 75% of all international cargo services. Prior to the process being abandoned by the incoming Slovakian government in 2006, the company had been recognised as having submitted the best bid for the Slovakian goods traffic railway company ZSSK Cargo, which was set to be privatised. Via the acquisition of two separate companies, RCA entered the Spanish rail market. By July 2007, RCA was reportedly transporting 93 million tons of cargo, making it the fourth largest rail freight company in Europe.

By mid-2007, RCA was assessing opportunities related to the goods transport division of the Hungarian State Railways (MÁV-Cargo), which policy makers had declared their intention to privatise. During 2008, the RCA purchased the freight transport division of the Hungarian Railways (MÁV Cargo Rt.); the Rail Cargo Hungaria Zrt. (RCH) transports 135,000 trains and 32 million tons of goods annually. On 1 March 2010 MAV Cargo was renamed Rail Cargo Hungaria.

During 2016, RCG recorded an annual turnover of 2.1 billion euros. At the time, it consisted of 8,400 employees, held more than 50 operating companies; more than 30 of those are majority shareholdings. RCG had also established offices in 18 individual countries; its home markets were considered to be Austria and Hungary.

In January 2017, ÖBB signed framework agreement with Siemens for 200 Vectron electric locomotives. These are to be used by RCG, and will primarily serve on its cross-border freight services in numerous countries, including Austria, Czech Republic, Croatia, Germany, Hungary, Italy, Poland, Slovakia and Slovenia; for this purpose, these locomotives have been configured with both national control systems and European Train Control System apparatus to maximise flexibility.

Early in 2018, RGA investigated options to standardise its international operations to a greater extent, particularly in terms of traffic management, planning, ordering, and resource dispatching. Following a successful trial, it was decided to adopt the RailCube enterprise resource planning software package for this purpose, which is claimed to improve customer information and operational flexibility. One year later, RCA started the SmartCargo project, installing telematics modules onto its wagons to provide position detection, motion sensors, and impact detection; the initiative has been credited with improved maintenance coordination and enabled new customer services.

On 12 April 2018, a direct freight train from Chengdu, China, ran over the 9,800-kilometer route (via Kazakhstan, Russia, Ukraine and Slovakia) to Vienna for the first time. As it is necessary to change between standard and broad gauge track along this route, plans for the extension of the (Russian) wide gauge railway network up to the Vienna area have been mooted for several years - together with other railway companies - such as the proposed Košice-Vienna broad gauge line.

In May 2019, RCA launched a new long distance cargo service between Vienna and the Swedish ferry port of Trelleborg that runs up to four times per week to better connect Austria with Northern Europe. Later that same year, a new intermodal service, branded TransFER, commenced between Austria, Hungary, northern European, southeastern Europe, and Turkey. In late 2019, RCA acquired Rail Time Polska Sp. z.o.o. after which the company started providing its own traction services in Poland.

During January 2020, a new biweekly non-stop freight service was launched between the Italian city of Verona and Germany's largest Baltic Sea port in Lübeck, under the TransFER brand. In March 2021, RCA launched a new TransFER service between Verona and the German city of Hannover that runs non-stop four times per week. Further reorganisation of the TransFER network was enacted that year, particularly in eastern Europe; in June 2021, a partnership between RCA and Pasifik Eurasi to cooperate on freight transportation between Europe and Asia via Turkey. In May 2022, RCA ran its first test train between Spain and Austria.

== Organization ==
Rail Cargo Austria itself owns shares of other companies in the ÖBB Group as well as subsidiaries in the freight-forwarding sector.

The corporate group is subdivided into the following business areas:

=== Rail Cargo Logistics ===
Rail Cargo Logistics - Austria GmbH was founded in 1947 as Express-Interfracht Internationale Spedition GmbH and has been part of Rail Cargo Austria AG since 1999.

The brand name Rail Cargo Logistics unites three companies since 2014 and is a full-service provider for intermodal rail freight forwarding of bulk goods.

The Rail Cargo Logistics includes:

- Rail Cargo Logistics - Austria GmbH: subsidiary for rail transport, MOBILER logistics - combination of rail and road, road transport and warehouse logistics
- Rail Cargo Logistics GmbH: subsidiary for transport logistics for bulk goods
- Rail Cargo Logistics - Environmental Services GmbH: logistics company in the field of waste recycling and waste disposal

=== Rail Cargo Operator ===
Under the brand name Rail Cargo Operator, five Central and Eastern European operator companies of the RCG operate international intermodal transport services in the accompanied (ROLA - rolling highway) and unaccompanied combined transport.

The five companies include:

- Rail Cargo Operator - Austria GmbH (Austria)
- Vectron in Slovenia
  Rail Cargo Operator - CSKD s.r.o. (Czech Republic and Slovakia)
- Rail Cargo Operator - Hungaria Kft. (Hungary)
- Rail Cargo Terminal - BILK Zrt. (Hungary)
- Adria Kombi d.o.o. (Slovenia)

=== Rail Cargo Carrier ===
Rail Cargo Carrier provides locomotives and employees and carries block trains to and from Central, Southern and Eastern Europe, as far as Russia or Turkey.

The Rail Cargo Carrier brand comprises the following companies:

- ÖBB Produktion GmbH
- Rail Cargo Hungaria Zrt.
- Rail Cargo Carrier Kft

=== Rail Cargo Wagon - Austria GmbH ===
Rail Cargo Wagon - Austria GmbH was founded as part of the outsourcing of all freight wagons to its own company. It controls the wagon fleet of the Rail Cargo Group.

=== Technical Services ===
This business unit summarizes the activities associated with maintenance and servicing. The brand Technical Services summarizes the following companies:

- ÖBB Technical Services GmbH
- Technical Services Hungaria Kft.
- TS-MAV Gépészet Services Kft.
- Technical Services Slovakia s.r.o.
