= 2015–16 Nemzeti Bajnokság I (women's handball) =

K&H női kézilabda liga
- Season: 2015–16
- Champions: Győr (12th title)
- Relegated: No team relegated
- Champions League: Győr; Ferencváros
- EHF Cup: Dunaújváros; Érd; Debrecen; Fehérvár
- Top goalscorer: Katarina Krpež-Slezak (204 goals)

The 2015–16 Nemzeti Bajnokság I (known as the K&H női kézilabda liga for sponsorship reasons) is the 65th season of the Nemzeti Bajnokság I, Hungarian premier Handball league.

== Team information ==
Location of teams in 2015–16 Nemzeti Bajnokság I

The following 12 clubs compete in the NB I during the 2015–16 season:

Team	Location	Arena	Capacity
Békéscsabai Előre NKSE	Békéscsaba	Városi Sportcsarnok	2,300
Budaörs KC	Budaörs	Városi Uszoda és Sportcsarnok	1,000
Debreceni VSC	Debrecen	Hódos Imre Sportcsarnok	1,800
Dunaújvárosi Kohász KA	Dunaújváros	Dunaferr Sportcsarnok	1,200
Érd NK	Érd	Érd Aréna	1,800
Fehérvár KC	Székesfehérvár	KÖFÉM Sportcsarnok	1,000
Ferencvárosi TC	Budapest	Elek Gyula Aréna	1,300
Győri ETO KC	Győr	Audi Aréna	5,554
Mosonmagyaróvári KC	Mosonmagyaróvár	Mosonszolnok Sportcsarnok	600
MTK Budapest	Budapest	Elektromos csarnok	700
Siófok KC	Siófok	Beszédes József Sportcsarnok	550
Váci NKSE	Vác	Városi Sportcsarnok	620

=== Personnel and kits ===
Following is the list of clubs competing in 2015–16 Nemzeti Bajnokság I, with their president, head coach, kit manufacturer and shirt sponsor.

Team	President	Head coach	Kit manufacturer	Shirt sponsor(s)
Békéscsabai Előre	Károly Szabó	(Hungary) Károly Szabó	Ziccer	EUbility Group Kft., Budapest Bank
Budaörs	Tamás Neukum	(Hungary) Attila Mihály	hummel	Szerencsejáték Zrt.
Debreceni VSC	Vilmos Köstner	(Slovenia) Tone Tiselj	Erima	TvP, Cívis Ház, Szerencsejáték Zrt.
Dunaújvárosi Kohász	István Szemenyei	(Croatia) Zdravko Zovko	hummel	Kohász Kézilabda Akadámia
Érd	Norbert Tekauer	(Hungary) Edina Szabó	Erima	Nagycsaládosok Országos Egyesülete
Fehérvár KC	Imre Balassi	(Hungary) Rita Deli (caretaker)	hummel	Avis
Ferencváros	Gábor Kubatov	(Hungary) Gábor Elek	Nike	Rail Cargo Hungaria, Aegon, Budapest
Győri ETO	Ernő Kelecsényi	(Spain) Ambros Martín	adidas	Audi, Győr, Szerencsejáték Zrt.
Mosonmagyaróvár	Dr. Gábor Tenk	(Hungary) József Varga	Ziccer	UFM, PwC
MTK	Tamás Deutsch	(Hungary) Vladimir Golovin	Luanvi	
Siófok	János Fodor	(Denmark) Christian Dalmose	hummel	Szerencsejáték Zrt., Cheeseland
Vác	Erika Kirsner	(Hungary) Katalin Ottó (caretaker)	Erima	IPress Center

==== Managerial changes ====
Team	Outgoing manager	Manner of departure	Date of vacancy	Position in table	Replaced by	Date of appointment
Békéscsabai Előre	(Hungary) György Avar	Mutual consent	7 October 2015	10th	(Hungary) Károly Szabó (president)	7 October 2015
Dunaújvárosi Kohász	(Hungary) Eszter Mátéfi	Sacked	8 October 2015	5th	(Croatia) Zdravko Zovko	12 October 2015
Debreceni VSC	(Hungary) József Varga	Mutual consent	30 November 2015	7th	(Slovenia) Tone Tiselj	1 December 2015
Vác	(Slovenia) Uroš Bregar	Mutual consent	19 January 2016	8th	(Hungary) Katalin Ottó (caretaker)	20 January 2016
Fehérvár KC	(Hungary) Botond Bakó	Sacked	29 February 2016	8th	(Hungary) Rita Deli (caretaker)	1 March 2016
Mosonmagyaróvár	(Hungary) Tamás Hlavaty	Sacked	11 March 2016	11th	(Hungary) József Varga	12 March 2016

== Regular season ==
Pos	Team	Pld	W	D	L	GF	GA	GD	Pts	Qualification
1	Győri Audi ETO KC	22	20	1	1	719	457	+262	41 (Note: GYŐR 33–22 FTC; FTC 29–28 GYŐR)	Playoffs
2	FTC-Rail Cargo Hungária	22	20	1	1	703	507	+196	41	Playoffs
3	Dunaújvárosi Kohász KA	22	14	3	5	621	556	+65	31 (Note: DKKA 28–20 SKC; SKC 27–25 DKKA)	Playoffs
4	Siófok KTC KFT	22	15	1	6	590	555	+35	31	Playoffs
5	Érd	22	14	0	8	614	526	+88	28	Playoffs
6	DVSC-TvP	22	10	0	12	567	555	+12	20 (Note: DVSC 28–21 VÁC; VÁC 32–28 DVSC)	Playoffs
7	IPress Center-Vác	22	10	0	12	571	593	−22	20	Playoffs
8	Fehérvár KC	22	9	1	12	546	540	+6	19	Playoffs
9	MTK Budapest	22	6	3	13	504	523	−19	15	Relegation Round
10	EUbility Group Békéscsaba	22	4	1	17	538	703	−165	9	Relegation Round
11	Mosonmagyaróvári KC SE	22	2	1	19	496	617	−121	5	Relegation Round
12	Budaörs	22	2	0	20	479	714	−235	4	Relegation Round

=== Schedule and results ===
Home \ Away	BÉK	BUD	DVSC	DKKA	ÉRD	FKC	FTC	GYŐR	MOS	MTK	SKC	VÁC
Békéscsaba		31–18	28–30	28–36	20–25	20–33	22–41	22–31	29–27	26–26	20–29	28–23
Budaörs	24–19		23–35	22–36	22–34	14–34	25–36	19–36	23–21	26–34	24–32	30–41
Debreceni VSC	36–24	33–13		26–24	28–29	21–19	18–30	19–28	33–23	35–12	21–30	28–21
Dunaújvárosi Kohász KA	37–22	37–28	28–24		21–20	28–26	29–29	27–27	31–24	33–23	28–20	29–26
Érd	48–31	34–20	32–20	33–26		32–23	26–27	27–36	23–18	37–30	24–25	16–18
Fehérvár KC	34–24	28–21	29–27	20–20	17–21		28–34	20–31	25–19	25–23	29–23	23–28
Ferencváros	39–22	39–17	32–24	32–22	30–19	28–20		29–28	30–20	36–22	29–25	27–21
Győri ETO	39–19	31–14	34–17	28–20	27–26	32–24	33–22		35–16	38–16	29–26	38–22
Mosonmagyaróvár	30–19	27–26	19–25	25–28	20–24	22–24	18–34	21–41		20–20	27–31	24–29
MTK Budapest	29–32	28–19	27–22	22–28	19–33	21–19	21–37	12–27	24–23		25–25	26–29
Siófok	34–26	35–26	18–17	27–25	28–24	24–21	24–26	19–37	30–27	33–23		26–23
Vác	34–26	33–23	32–28	24–28	20–27	27–25	23–36	20–33	33–25	20–21	24–26	

Legend: Blue = home team win; Yellow = draw; Red = away team win.

== Playoffs ==
Teams in bold won the playoff series. Numbers to the left of each team indicate the team's original playoff seeding. Numbers to the right indicate the score of each playoff game.

Quarterfinals
1	**Győri Audi ETO KC**	32	34	**66**
8	Fehérvár KC	20	25	**45**
4	Siófok KTC KFT	32	29	**61**
5	**Érd**	30	34	**64**
2	**FTC-Rail Cargo Hungária**	33	25	**58**
7	IPress Center-Vác	23	23	**46**
3	Dunaújvárosi Kohász KA	29	23	**52**
6	**DVSC-TvP** (a)	24	28	**52**

Semifinals
1	**Győri Audi ETO KC**	42	27	**69**
5	Érd	26	24	**50**
2	**FTC-Rail Cargo Hungária**	31	26	**57**
6	DVSC-TvP	24	25	**49**

Finals
1	**Győri Audi ETO KC**	26	27	**53**
2	FTC-Rail Cargo Hungária	22	21	**43**
Third place
5	**Érd**	25	21	**46**
6	DVSC-TvP	21	20	**41**

=== Quarterfinals ===
13 April; 18:00	**Győri Audi ETO KC**	**32–20**	**Fehérvár KC**	Audi Aréna, Győr; Attendance: 1,983; Referees: Haraszti, Nachtmann
13 April; 18:00	Løke 6	(15–8)	Csáki 5	Audi Aréna, Győr; Attendance: 1,983; Referees: Haraszti, Nachtmann
13 April; 18:00	3× (yellow card) 4× (suspension)	Report	3× (yellow card) 4× (suspension)	Audi Aréna, Győr; Attendance: 1,983; Referees: Haraszti, Nachtmann

15 April; 18:00	**Fehérvár KC**	**25–34**	**Győri Audi ETO KC,**	KÖFÉM Sportcsarnok, Székesfehérvár; Attendance: 800; Referees: Felhő, Öcsi
15 April; 18:00	Mayer 5	(15–17)	Løke, Amorim 6	KÖFÉM Sportcsarnok, Székesfehérvár; Attendance: 800; Referees: Felhő, Öcsi
15 April; 18:00	3× (yellow card) 4× (suspension)	Report	3× (yellow card) 5× (suspension)	KÖFÉM Sportcsarnok, Székesfehérvár; Attendance: 800; Referees: Felhő, Öcsi

Győri Audi ETO KC won 66–45 on aggregate.

13 April; 18:00	**Siófok KTC KFT**	**32–30**	**Érd**	Beszédes József Sportcsarnok, Siófok; Attendance: 600; Referees: Dobrovits, Tájok
13 April; 18:00	González 6	(18–13)	Krpež-Slezak 8	Beszédes József Sportcsarnok, Siófok; Attendance: 600; Referees: Dobrovits, Tájok
13 April; 18:00	1× (yellow card) 4× (suspension)	Report	2× (yellow card) 4× (suspension)	Beszédes József Sportcsarnok, Siófok; Attendance: 600; Referees: Dobrovits, Tájok

20 April; 18:00	**Érd**	**34–29**	**Siófok KTC KFT**	ÉRD Aréna, Érd; Attendance: 1,700; Referees: Herczeg, Südi
20 April; 18:00	Krpež-Slezak 13	(19–12)	Elghaoui 9	ÉRD Aréna, Érd; Attendance: 1,700; Referees: Herczeg, Südi
20 April; 18:00	2× (yellow card) 3× (suspension)	Report	3× (yellow card) 6× (suspension)	ÉRD Aréna, Érd; Attendance: 1,700; Referees: Herczeg, Südi

Érd won 64–61 on aggregate.

12 April; 18:00	**FTC-Rail Cargo Hungária**	**33–23**	**IPress Center-Vác**	Elek Gyula Aréna, Budapest; Attendance: 400; Referees: Kékes, Kékes
12 April; 18:00	Hornyák 7	(19–9)	Bašić 6	Elek Gyula Aréna, Budapest; Attendance: 400; Referees: Kékes, Kékes
12 April; 18:00	3× (yellow card) 3× (suspension)	Report	3× (yellow card) 4× (suspension)	Elek Gyula Aréna, Budapest; Attendance: 400; Referees: Kékes, Kékes

16 April; 18:00	**IPress Center-Vác**	**23–25**	**FTC-Rail Cargo Hungária**	Városi Sportcsarnok, Vác; Attendance: 500; Referees: Horváth, Marton
16 April; 18:00	Jovetić, Bašić 5	(10–14)	Lukács 8	Városi Sportcsarnok, Vác; Attendance: 500; Referees: Horváth, Marton
16 April; 18:00	3× (yellow card) 2× (suspension)	Report	3× (yellow card) 5× (suspension)	Városi Sportcsarnok, Vác; Attendance: 500; Referees: Horváth, Marton

FTC-Rail Cargo Hungária won 58–46 on aggregate.

13 April; 18:00	**Dunaújvárosi Kohász KA**	**29–24**	**DVSC-TvP**	Városi Sportcsarnok, Dunaújváros; Attendance: 800; Referees: Tomecskó-Hunyadi, Unyatinszki
13 April; 18:00	A. Kovács 8	(12–15)	Klikovac 7	Városi Sportcsarnok, Dunaújváros; Attendance: 800; Referees: Tomecskó-Hunyadi, Unyatinszki
13 April; 18:00	3× (yellow card) 3× (suspension)	Report	3× (yellow card) 8× (suspension)	Városi Sportcsarnok, Dunaújváros; Attendance: 800; Referees: Tomecskó-Hunyadi, Unyatinszki

20 April; 18:00	**DVSC-TvP**	**28–23**	**Dunaújvárosi Kohász KA**	Hódos Imre Sportcsarnok, Debrecen; Attendance: 1,800; Referees: Hargitai, Markó
20 April; 18:00	Kudor 9	(14–14)	A. Kovács 12	Hódos Imre Sportcsarnok, Debrecen; Attendance: 1,800; Referees: Hargitai, Markó
20 April; 18:00	3× (yellow card) 3× (suspension)	Report	3× (yellow card) 6× (suspension) 1× (red card)	Hódos Imre Sportcsarnok, Debrecen; Attendance: 1,800; Referees: Hargitai, Markó

52–52 on aggregate. DVSC-TvP won on away goals.

=== Semifinals ===
24 April; 18:00	**Győri Audi ETO KC**	**42–26**	**Érd**	Audi Aréna, Győr; Attendance: 2,708; Referees: Bíró, Kiss
24 April; 18:00	Løke, Sulland 7	(22–14)	Khavronina 6	Audi Aréna, Győr; Attendance: 2,708; Referees: Bíró, Kiss
24 April; 18:00	3× (yellow card) 3× (suspension)	Report	3× (yellow card) 4× (suspension)	Audi Aréna, Győr; Attendance: 2,708; Referees: Bíró, Kiss

12 May; 20:30	**Érd**	**24–27**	**Győri Audi ETO KC**	ÉRD Aréna, Érd; Attendance: 1,600; Referees: Medve, Nagy
12 May; 20:30	Klivinyi, Krpež-Slezak 5	(14–12)	Görbicz, Kovacsics 5	ÉRD Aréna, Érd; Attendance: 1,600; Referees: Medve, Nagy
12 May; 20:30	3× (yellow card) 1× (suspension)	Report	3× (yellow card) 3× (suspension)	ÉRD Aréna, Érd; Attendance: 1,600; Referees: Medve, Nagy

Győri Audi ETO KC won 69–50 on aggregate.

27 April; 18:00	**FTC-Rail Cargo Hungária**	**31–24**	**DVSC-TvP**	Elek Gyula Aréna, Budapest; Attendance: 600; Referees: B.Pech, Vágvölgyi
27 April; 18:00	Pena 7	(16–11)	Siska 7	Elek Gyula Aréna, Budapest; Attendance: 600; Referees: B.Pech, Vágvölgyi
27 April; 18:00	3× (yellow card) 3× (suspension)	Report	2× (yellow card) 8× (suspension) 1× (red card)	Elek Gyula Aréna, Budapest; Attendance: 600; Referees: B.Pech, Vágvölgyi

11 May; 18:00	**DVSC-TvP**	**25–26**	**FTC-Rail Cargo Hungária**	Hódos Imre Sportcsarnok, Debrecen; Attendance: 1,800; Referees: Nagy, Túróczy
11 May; 18:00	Garbuz 6	(11–14)	Pena 6	Hódos Imre Sportcsarnok, Debrecen; Attendance: 1,800; Referees: Nagy, Túróczy
11 May; 18:00	3× (yellow card) 1× (suspension)	Report	3× (yellow card) 2× (suspension)	Hódos Imre Sportcsarnok, Debrecen; Attendance: 1,800; Referees: Nagy, Túróczy

FTC-Rail Cargo Hungária won 57–49 on aggregate.

=== Third place ===
19 May; 19:00	**Érd**	**25–21**	**DVSC-TvP**	ÉRD Aréna, Érd; Attendance: 1,500; Referees: Hargitai, Markó
19 May; 19:00	Krpež-Slezak 9	(15–8)	Garbuz 7	ÉRD Aréna, Érd; Attendance: 1,500; Referees: Hargitai, Markó
19 May; 19:00	3× (yellow card) 4× (suspension)	Report	2× (yellow card) 3× (suspension)	ÉRD Aréna, Érd; Attendance: 1,500; Referees: Hargitai, Markó

26 May; 18:00	**DVSC-TvP**	**20–21**	**Érd**	Hódos Imre Sportcsarnok, Debrecen; Attendance: 2,000; Referees: Bán, Szloska
26 May; 18:00	Kudor 7	(13–10)	Krpež-Slezak 6	Hódos Imre Sportcsarnok, Debrecen; Attendance: 2,000; Referees: Bán, Szloska
26 May; 18:00	3× (yellow card) 3× (suspension)	Report	3× (yellow card) 3× (suspension)	Hódos Imre Sportcsarnok, Debrecen; Attendance: 2,000; Referees: Bán, Szloska

Érd won Third place, 46–41 on aggregate.

=== Finals ===
19 May; 16:40	**Győri Audi ETO KC**	**26–22**	**FTC-Rail Cargo Hungária**	Audi Aréna, Győr; Attendance: 4,387; Referees: Bacs, Bóna
19 May; 16:40	Görbicz 7	(11–6)	Kovacsicz 7	Audi Aréna, Győr; Attendance: 4,387; Referees: Bacs, Bóna
19 May; 16:40	2× (yellow card) 2× (suspension)	Report	3× (yellow card) 4× (suspension)	Audi Aréna, Győr; Attendance: 4,387; Referees: Bacs, Bóna

24 May; 18:00	**FTC-Rail Cargo Hungária**	**21–27**	**Győri Audi ETO KC**	Elek Gyula Aréna, Budapest; Attendance: 1,200; Referees: Dobrovits, Tájok
24 May; 18:00	Pena 7	(9–9)	Amorim 6	Elek Gyula Aréna, Budapest; Attendance: 1,200; Referees: Dobrovits, Tájok
24 May; 18:00	3× (yellow card) 2× (suspension)	Report	2× (yellow card) 5× (suspension) 1× (red card)	Elek Gyula Aréna, Budapest; Attendance: 1,200; Referees: Dobrovits, Tájok

Győri Audi ETO KC won the FINAL, 53–43 on aggregate.

2015–16 NB I Winner

**12th title**

Kari Aalvik Grimsbø, Éva Kiss, Ida Alstad, Eduarda Amorim, Bernadett Bódi, Yvette Broch, Cornelia Groot, Anita Görbicz (c), Júlia Harsfalvi, Anette Hudák, Jana Knedlíková, Dorina Korsós, Anikó Kovacsics, Rita Lakatos, Heidi Løke, Vivien Moharos, Adrienn Orbán, Szimonetta Planéta, Linn Jørum Sulland, Zsuzsanna Tomori, Gabriella Tóth, Alexa Wéninger
Head coach: Ambros Martín

== 5th–8th placement matches ==
Teams in bold won the placement matches. Numbers to the left of each team indicate the team's original playoff seeding. Numbers to the right indicate the score of each placement game.

5th–8th place Semifinals
**3**	**Dunaújvárosi Kohász KA**	**27**	**28**	**55**
7	IPress Center-Vác	25	22	47
4	Siófok KTC KFT	**27**	26	53
**8**	**Fehérvár KC**	26	**31**	**57**

5th place Final
**3**	**Dunaújvárosi Kohász KA**	**34**	27	**61**
8	Fehérvár KC	26	**28**	54
7th place Final
**7**	**IPress Center-Vác**	**29**	**33**	**62**
4	Siófok KTC KFT	27	31	58

=== 5th–8th place semifinals ===
24 April; 17:00	**Dunaújvárosi Kohász KA**	**27–25**	**IPress Center-Vác**	Városi Sportcsarnok, Dunaújváros; Attendance: 400; Referees: Andorka, Hucker
24 April; 17:00	D. Takács, Triscsuk 6	(16–9)	Soós 7	Városi Sportcsarnok, Dunaújváros; Attendance: 400; Referees: Andorka, Hucker
24 April; 17:00	2× (yellow card) 3× (suspension)	Report	3× (yellow card) 5× (suspension)	Városi Sportcsarnok, Dunaújváros; Attendance: 400; Referees: Andorka, Hucker

11 May; 18:30	**IPress Center-Vác**	**22–28**	**Dunaújvárosi Kohász KA**	Városi Sportcsarnok, Vác; Attendance: 350; Referees: Bán, Szloska
11 May; 18:30	V. Farkas 6	(10–14)	A. Kovács 8	Városi Sportcsarnok, Vác; Attendance: 350; Referees: Bán, Szloska
11 May; 18:30	2× (yellow card) 1× (suspension)	Report	2× (yellow card) 2× (suspension)	Városi Sportcsarnok, Vác; Attendance: 350; Referees: Bán, Szloska

Dunaújvárosi Kohász KA won 55–47 on aggregate.

4 May; 18:00	**Siófok KTC KFT**	**27–26**	**Fehérvár KC**	Beszédes József Sportcsarnok, Siófok; Attendance: 450; Referees: Tomecskó-Hunyadi, Unyatinszki
4 May; 18:00	Erdősi 10	(11–17)	A. Herr 7	Beszédes József Sportcsarnok, Siófok; Attendance: 450; Referees: Tomecskó-Hunyadi, Unyatinszki
4 May; 18:00	2× (yellow card) 3× (suspension)	Report	2× (yellow card) 6× (suspension)	Beszédes József Sportcsarnok, Siófok; Attendance: 450; Referees: Tomecskó-Hunyadi, Unyatinszki

11 May; 18:00	**Fehérvár KC**	**31–26**	**Siófok KTC KFT**	KÖFÉM Sportcsarnok, Székesfehérvár; Attendance: 500; Referees: Bócz, Wiedemann
11 May; 18:00	Kazai 8	(15–12)	Erdősi, Nikitina 6	KÖFÉM Sportcsarnok, Székesfehérvár; Attendance: 500; Referees: Bócz, Wiedemann
11 May; 18:00	3× (yellow card) 2× (suspension)	Report	2× (yellow card) 1× (suspension)	KÖFÉM Sportcsarnok, Székesfehérvár; Attendance: 500; Referees: Bócz, Wiedemann

Fehérvár KC won 57–53 on aggregate.

=== 7th place final ===
18 May; 18:30	**IPress Center-Vác**	**29–27**	**Siófok KTC KFT**	Városi Sportcsarnok, Vác; Attendance: 350; Referees: Bonifert, Oláh
18 May; 18:30	Jovetić 7	(14–12)	Erdősi 6	Városi Sportcsarnok, Vác; Attendance: 350; Referees: Bonifert, Oláh
18 May; 18:30	2× (yellow card) 2× (suspension)	Report	2× (yellow card) 5× (suspension)	Városi Sportcsarnok, Vác; Attendance: 350; Referees: Bonifert, Oláh

21 May; 18:00	**Siófok KTC KFT**	**31–33**	**IPress Center-Vác**	Beszédes József Sportcsarnok, Siófok; Attendance: 200; Referees: Altmár, Horváth
21 May; 18:00	Aguilar 7	(18–18)	Soós, Bašić 8	Beszédes József Sportcsarnok, Siófok; Attendance: 200; Referees: Altmár, Horváth
21 May; 18:00	3× (yellow card) 2× (suspension)	Report	2× (yellow card) 2× (suspension)	Beszédes József Sportcsarnok, Siófok; Attendance: 200; Referees: Altmár, Horváth

IPress Center Vác won 7th place, 62–58 on aggregate.

=== 5th place final ===
20 May; 18:00	**Dunaújvárosi Kohász KA**	**34–26**	**Fehérvár KC**	Városi Sportcsarnok, Dunaújváros; Attendance: 800; Referees: Horváth, Marton
20 May; 18:00	Triscsuk 8	(13–10)	Mayer 8	Városi Sportcsarnok, Dunaújváros; Attendance: 800; Referees: Horváth, Marton
20 May; 18:00	3× (yellow card) 2× (suspension)	Report	3× (yellow card) 2× (suspension)	Városi Sportcsarnok, Dunaújváros; Attendance: 800; Referees: Horváth, Marton

26 May; 18:00	**Fehérvár KC**	**28–27**	**Dunaújvárosi Kohász KA**	KÖFÉM Sportcsarnok, Székesfehérvár; Attendance: 500; Referees: Tomecskó-Hunyadi, Unyatinszki
26 May; 18:00	Bandelier 11	(11–15)	Vincze 6	KÖFÉM Sportcsarnok, Székesfehérvár; Attendance: 500; Referees: Tomecskó-Hunyadi, Unyatinszki
26 May; 18:00	3× (yellow card) 2× (suspension)	Report	2× (yellow card) 6× (suspension)	KÖFÉM Sportcsarnok, Székesfehérvár; Attendance: 500; Referees: Tomecskó-Hunyadi, Unyatinszki

Dunaújvárosi Kohász KA won 5th place, 61–54 on aggregate.

== Relegation round ==
Pos	Team	Pld	W	D	L	GF	GA	GD	Pts
9	MTK Budapest	12	7	3	2	322	271	+51	17
10	Mosonmagyaróvári KC SE	12	7	2	3	309	276	+33	16
11	EUbility Group Békéscsaba	12	4	1	7	297	312	−15	9
12	Budaörs	12	3	0	9	258	327	−69	6

=== Schedule and results ===
Home \ Away	BÉK	BUD	MOS	MTK	BÉK	BUD	MOS	MTK
Békéscsaba		28–19	24–25	23–24		31–18	29–27	26–26
Budaörs	28–27		19–27	17–28	24–19		23–21	26–34
Mosonmagyaróvár	31–23	28–20		25–24	30–19	27–26		20–20
MTK Budapest	31–16	29–19	25–25		29–32	28–19	24–23	

Legend: Blue = home team win; Yellow = draw; Red = away team win.

== Season statistics ==
=== Top goalscorers ===
Updated to games played on 26 May 2016.

Rank	Player	Team	Goals
1	(Serbia) Katarina Krpež-Slezak	Érd	204
2	(Hungary) Anna Kovács	Dunaújvárosi Kohász KA	177
3	(Hungary) Kinga Klivinyi	Érd	140
4	(Hungary) Krisztina Triscsuk	Dunaújvárosi Kohász KA	134
5	(Hungary) Kata Földes	Budaörs	127
5	(Hungary) Kitti Kudor	DVSC-TvP	127
7	(Hungary) Luca Szekerczés	FTC-Rail Cargo Hungária	125
7	(Hungary) Ildikó Erdősi	Siófok KC	125
9	(Russia) Maria Garbuz	DVSC-TvP	121
10	(Norway) Heidi Løke	Győri Audi ETO KC	116

=== Number of teams by counties ===
Pos.	County (megye)	No. of teams	Teams
1	Pest	3	Budaörs KC, Érd and Váci NKSE
2	Budapest	2	Ferencvárosi TC and MTK
2	Fejér	2	Dunaújvárosi Kohász and Fehérvár KC
2	Győr-Moson-Sopron	2	Győri ETO and Mosonmagyaróvári KC
5	Békés	1	Békéscsabai Előre
5	Hajdú-Bihar	1	Debreceni VSC
5	Somogy	1	Siófok KC

== Hungarian clubs in European competitions ==
Women's EHF Champions League

- FTC-Rail Cargo Hungária

Round	Club	Home	Away	Aggregate
Group Phase (Group B)	(Germany) Thüringer HC	32–28	30–27	1st
Group Phase (Group B)	(Croatia) RK Podravka Koprivnica	28–16	27–24	1st
Group Phase (Group B)	(France) Fleury Loiret Handball	36–23	28–28	1st
Main Round (Group 1)	(Russia) Rostov-Don	29–29	21–23	3rd
Main Round (Group 1)	(Norway) Larvik HK	30–27	31–37	3rd
Main Round (Group 1)	(Romania) HCM Baia Mare	21–18	24–32	3rd
Quarter-final	(Hungary) Győri Audi ETO KC	18–31	23–40	41–71

- Győri Audi ETO KC

Round		Club	Home	Away	Aggregate
QT	Semi-final	(Serbia) ŽRK Radnički Kragujevac	42–13		
QT	Final	(Norway) Glassverket IF	30–21		
Group Phase (Group C)		(Denmark) FC Midtjylland	21–26	22–22	1st
Group Phase (Group C)		(North Macedonia) ŽRK Vardar	28–27	27–22	1st
Group Phase (Group C)		(Austria) Hypo Niederösterreich	37–16	29–21	1st
Main Round (Group 2)		(Montenegro) Budućnost	22–20	22–25	2nd
Main Round (Group 2)		(Romania) CSM București	28–22	24–22	2nd
Main Round (Group 2)		(Sweden) IK Sävehof	32–26	26–18	2nd
Quarter-final		(Hungary) FTC-Rail Cargo Hungária	40–23	31–18	71–41
FF	Semi-final	(Montenegro) Budućnost	21–20		
FF	FINAL	(Romania) CSM București	25–25 (1–4 p)		

Women's EHF Cup

- Dunaújvárosi Kohász KA

Round	Club	Home	Away	Aggregate
Round 3	(Italy) Indeco Conversano	37–25	31–24	68–49
Last 16	(Hungary) Siófok KC	24–19	23–28	47–47 (a)
Quarter-final	(Russia) Astrakhanochka	25–20	23–26	48–46
Semi-finals	(Denmark) Randers HK	23–25	29–27	52–52 (a)
Finals	(Germany) TuS Metzingen	29–21	26–28	55–49

- Siófok KC

Round	Club	Home	Away	Aggregate
Round 3	(Portugal) Alavarium / Love Tiles	40–25	39–21	79–46
Last 16	(Hungary) Dunaújvárosi Kohász KA (a)	28–23	19–24	47–47

Women's EHF Cup Winners' Cup

- Érd

Round	Club	Home	Away	Aggregate
Round 3	(Croatia) ŽRK Umag	31–18	36–24	67–42
Last 16	(Netherlands) SERCODAK Dalfsen	27–25	27–15	54–40
Quarter-final	(France) Issy Paris Hand (a)	29–28	17–18	46–46

== Final standing ==
Rank	Team	Qualification or relegation
1st place, gold medalist(s)	Győri Audi ETO KC	2016–17 Women's EHF Champions League group stage
2nd place, silver medalist(s)	FTC-Rail Cargo Hungária	2016–17 Women's EHF Champions League group stage
3rd place, bronze medalist(s)	Érd	2016–17 Women's EHF Cup round 2
4	DVSC-TvP	2016–17 Women's EHF Cup round 2
5	Dunaújvárosi Kohász KA	2016–17 Women's EHF Cup round 3
6	Fehérvár KC^{1}	2016–17 Women's EHF Cup round 1
7	IPress Center-Vác	
8	Siófok KTC KFT	
9	MTK Budapest	
10	Mosonmagyaróvári KC SE	
11	EUbility Group Békéscsaba	
12	Budaörs	

^{1} Since 2015–16 EHF Cup winner Dunaújvárosi Kohász KA automatically qualified for the 2016–17 EHF Cup round 3, the additional EHF Cup spot was passed to championship 6th Fehérvár KC.

== See also ==
- 2015–16 Magyar Kupa
