= 2016–17 Nemzeti Bajnokság I (women's handball) =

K&H női kézilabda liga
- Season: 2016–17
- Champions: Győr (13th title)
- Relegated: Mosonmagyaróvár; Kispest
- Champions League: Győr; Ferencváros
- EHF Cup: Érd; Dunaújváros; Debrecen; Vác
- Matches: 182
- Goals: 9,943 (54.63 per match)
- Top goalscorer: Krisztina Triscsuk (181 goals)

The 2016–17 Nemzeti Bajnokság I (known as the K&H női kézilabda liga for sponsorship reasons) is the 66th season of the Nemzeti Bajnokság I, Hungarian premier Handball league.

== Team information ==
Location of teams in 2016-17 Nemzeti Bajnokság I
Location of Budapest teams

The following 14 clubs compete in the NB I during the 2016–17 season:

Team	Location	Arena	Capacity
Alba Fehérvár KC	Székesfehérvár	KÖFÉM Sportcsarnok	1,000
Békéscsabai ENKSE	Békéscsaba	Városi Sportcsarnok	2,300
Budaörs Handball	Budaörs	Városi Uszoda és Sportcsarnok	1,000
Debreceni VSC	Debrecen	Hódos Imre Sportcsarnok	1,800
Dunaújvárosi KKA	Dunaújváros	Városi Sportcsarnok	1,200
Érd NK	Érd	Érd Aréna	1,800
Ferencvárosi TC	Budapest	Elek Gyula Aréna	1,300
Győri ETO KC	Győr	Audi Aréna	5,554
Kispest NKK	Budapest	Soroksári Sportcsarnok	1,000
Kisvárdai KC	Kisvárda	Városi Sportcsarnok	750
Mosonmagyaróvári KC SE	Mosonmagyaróvár	Mosonszolnok Sportcsarnok; UFM Aréna	600; 1,213
MTK Budapest	Budapest	Elektromos csarnok	700
Siófok KC	Siófok	Beszédes József Sportcsarnok	550
Váci NKSE	Vác	Városi Sportcsarnok	620

=== Personnel and kits ===
Following is the list of clubs competing in 2016–17 Nemzeti Bajnokság I, with their president, head coach, kit manufacturer and shirt sponsor.

Team	President	Head coach	Kit manufacturer	Shirt sponsor(s)
Alba Fehérvár	Imre Balassi	(Hungary) Rita Deli	hummel	Tippmix^{1}, Avis
Békéscsabai Előre	Károly Szabó	(Hungary) László Skaliczki	Ziccer	Tippmix^{1}, bmw-glass.hu, Budapest Bank
Budaörs	Tamás Neukum	(Hungary) Attila Mihály	Made by club	Tippmix^{1}
Debreceni VSC	Vilmos Köstner	(Slovenia) Tone Tiselj	Erima	Tippmix^{1}, TvP, Dryvit Profi
Dunaújvárosi Kohász	István Szemenyei	(Hungary) László György	hummel	Tippmix^{1}, BH
Érd	Norbert Tekauer	(Hungary) Edina Szabó	Erima	Tippmix^{1}, AutoPalace
Ferencváros	Gábor Kubatov	(Hungary) Gábor Elek	Nike	Tippmix^{1}, Rail Cargo Hungaria, Budapest
Győri ETO	dr. Csaba Bartha	(Spain) Ambros Martín	adidas	Audi, Győr, Tippmix^{1}
Kispest	Bertalan Béki Nagy	(Hungary) Bertalan Béki Nagy	Joma	Tippmix^{1}, Elios, Welltech
Kisvárda	Tamás Major	(Hungary) János Dévényi	adidas	Tippmix^{1}, Master Good, Kisvárda Várfürdő,
Mosonmagyaróvár	dr. Gábor Tenk	(Hungary) József Varga	Erima	Tippmix^{1}, Duvenbeck
MTK Budapest	Tamás Deutsch	(Hungary) Vladimir Golovin	Nike	Tippmix^{1}
Siófok	János Fodor	(Hungary) Roland Horváth	hummel	Tippmix^{1}
Vác	Erika Kirsner	(Hungary) Zoltán Szilágyi	Erima	Tippmix^{1}, IPress Center

==== Managerial changes ====
Team	Outgoing manager	Manner of departure	Date of vacancy	Position in table	Replaced by	Date of appointment
Siófok	(Denmark) Christian Dalmose	Sacked	27 May 2016	Pre-season	(Hungary) Roland Horváth	31 May 2016
Kisvárda	(Hungary) Sándor Rácz	Mutual consent	8 June 2016	Pre-season	(Hungary) Péter Kovács	9 June 2016
Békéscsabai Előre	(Hungary) Károly Szabó (president)		End of 2015–16 season	Pre-season	(Hungary) László Skaliczki	1 July 2016
Vác	(Hungary) Katalin Ottó (caretaker)		End of 2015–16 season	Pre-season	(Hungary) Zoltán Szilágyi	1 December 2016
Kisvárda	(Hungary) Péter Kovács	Sacked	10 November 2016	10th	(Hungary) János Dévényi	11 November 2016
Dunaújvárosi Kohász	(Croatia) Zdravko Zovko	Working as a consultant	8 February 2017	5th	(Hungary) László György	8 February 2017

== League table ==
Pos	Team	Pld	W	D	L	GF	GA	GD	Pts	Qualification or relegation
1	Győri Audi ETO KC (C)	26	25	1	0	885	573	+312	51	Qualification to Champions League group stage
2	FTC-Rail Cargo Hungaria	26	22	1	3	857	629	+228	45	Qualification to Champions League group stage
3	Érd	26	18	3	5	732	650	+82	39	Qualification to EHF Cup third qualifying round
4	Dunaújvárosi Kohász KA	26	18	1	7	771	654	+117	37	Qualification to EHF Cup second qualifying round
5	IPress Center-Vác	26	17	1	8	762	700	+62	35	Qualification to EHF Cup first qualifying round
6	Alba Fehérvár KC	26	12	0	14	717	712	+5	24 (Note: ALBA - DVSC: 29–23; DVSC - ALBA: 30–27)	
7	DVSC-TvP	26	10	4	12	684	675	+9	24	Qualification to EHF Cup second qualifying round (Note: Because both 2016–17 Magyar Kupa champions (FTC-Rail Cargo Hungaria) and runners-up (Győri Audi ETO KC) qualified for the EHF Champions League via their league position, the EHF Cup place is passed to DVSC-TvP as cup thirds.)
8	Siófok KC	26	9	2	15	742	737	+5	20 (Note: SKC - MTK: 35–29; MTK - SKC: 26–23)	
9	MTK Budapest	26	9	2	15	654	754	−100	20	
10	EUbility Group-Békéscsaba	26	7	4	15	631	717	−86	18	
11	Budaörs Handball	26	6	4	16	651	765	−114	16 (Note: BUD - KKC: 29–24; KKC - BUD: 26–26)	
12	Kisvárda Master Good SE	26	6	4	16	637	705	−68	16	
13	Mosonmagyaróvári KC SE (R)	26	7	1	18	589	702	−113	15	Relegation to Nemzeti Bajnokság I/B
14	ELIOS Kispest NKK (R)	26	1	2	23	631	970	−339	4	Relegation to Nemzeti Bajnokság I/B

(C) Champions; (R) Relegated
Notes:

2016–17 Nemzeti Bajnokság I Champion

13th title

Grimsbø, Kiss, Binó (goalkeepers), Amorim, Bódi, Broch, Elghaoui, Görbicz (c), Hársfalvi, Groot,
Korsós, Knedlíková, Løke, Mørk, Puhalák, Tomori (Hudák, Moharos, Pál, Orbán, G. Tóth)
Head coach
Ambros Martín

=== Schedule and results ===
Home \ Away	ALBA	BÉK	BUD	DVSC	DKKA	ÉRD	FTC	GYŐR	KISP	KKC	MOS	MTK	SKC	VÁC
Alba Fehérvár KC		32–27	32–20	29–23	26–27	32–35	27–31	28–35	36–29	28–23	23–17	30–22	27–26	31–25
Békéscsabai ENKSE	30–23		25–32	22–21	26–26	19–22	25–35	16–33	32–20	26–26	26–19	25–27	30–29	23–22
Budaörs Handball	26–33	29–25		21–30	25–33	17–28	25–33	22–32	26–26	29–24	27–22	26–27	24–19	29–30
Debreceni VSC	30–27	31–19	33–29		30–29	22–22	17–26	18–28	41–22	24–20	20–23	26–24	32–32	27–29
Dunaújvárosi Kohász KA	24–20	28–24	40–22	29–26		22–29	33–24	25–33	43–27	29–25	27–25	33–20	35–21	31–26
Érd NK	26–25	34–24	34–23	23–19	29–26		31–30	23–34	31–23	20–20	19–20	38–24	36–29	27–20
Ferencvárosi TC	36–25	38–24	34–25	33–20	27–23	31–25		28–28	44–25	32–25	34–20	38–21	37–27	39–23
Győri Audi ETO KC	36–22	33–16	40–20	32–23	36–27	35–20	28–19		44–21	29–16	37–19	40–25	34–25	33–22
Kispest NKK	25–42	22–30	24–24	24–43	23–39	30–47	19–43	25–46		29–34	22–29	21–30	23–36	31–41
Kisvárdai KC	23–22	22–22	26–26	26–29	28–37	22–28	26–30	21–32	29–22		23–18	26–21	28–26	24–26
Mosonmagyaróvári KC	29–31	21–21	23–27	25–24	17–25	22–25	19–31	23–36	30–22	21–20		18–25	23–33	25–36
MTK Budapest	29–26	27–26	30–30	25–19	20–31	25–25	27–41	22–27	31–32	27–25	25–29		26–23	23–33
Siófok KC	27–22	31–23	32–21	28–28	19–26	27–31	21–33	20–29	55–23	35–29	34–25	35–29		29–35
Váci NKSE	31–18	34–25	30–26	28–28	26–23	29–24	20–30	27–35	44–21	37–26	29–27	31–22	28–23	

Legend: Blue = home team win; Yellow = draw; Red = away team win.

== Season statistics ==
=== Top goalscorers ===
As of matches played on 28 May 2017.

Rank	Player	Team	Goals	Matches
1	(Hungary) Krisztina Triscsuk	Siófok	181	25
2	(Hungary) Anna Kovács	Dunaújváros	167	26
3	(Serbia) Katarina Krpež-Slezak	Érd	151	22
4	(Norway) Nora Mørk	Győri ETO	139	26
5	(France) Estelle Nze Minko	Siófok	133	22
6	(Brazil) Samira Rocha	Kisvárda	126	25
7	(Hungary) Barbara Pálos-Bognár	Budaörs	125	25
8	(Hungary) Kata Juhos	Budaörs	124	24
9	(Hungary) Réka Bízik	Mosonmagyaróvár	120	25
10	(Brazil) Alexandra do Nascimento	Vác	118	18

=== Attendances ===
Pos	Team	Total attendances	Average attendances	Highest attendances	Lowest attendances
1	Győri Audi ETO KC	37,548	2,888	4,998 (vs. Érd)	1,773 (vs. Kispest)
2	DVSC-TvP	19,800	1,523	5,500 (vs. Győri ETO)	800 (vs. MTK Budapest)
3	Érd	17,300	1,331	2,300 (vs. Győri ETO)	700 (vs. Békéscsaba)
4	EUbility Group-Békéscsaba	12,200	938	1,700 (vs. Győri ETO)	600 (vs. Kispest)
5	Kisvárda Master Good SE	9,985	768	1,000 (vs. Győri ETO)	600 (vs. Békéscsaba)
6	Budaörs Handball	9,093	699	900 (vs. Győri ETO)	400 (vs. Békéscsaba)
7	FTC-Rail Cargo Hungaria	8,650	665	1,200 (vs. Győri ETO)	400 (vs. Debreceni VSC)
8	Alba Fehérvár KC	8,386	645	896 (vs. Békéscsaba)	300 (vs. Kispest)
9	Dunaújvárosi Kohász KA	7,900	608	950 (vs. Győri ETO)	400 (vs. Mosonmagyaróvár)
10	Mosonmagyaróvári KC SE	7,470	575	1,000 (vs. Alba Fehérvár)	200 (vs. Kisvárda)
11	IPress Center-Vác	6,800	523	650 (vs. Érd)	400 (vs. Mosonmagyaróvár)
12	Siófok KC	6,030	464	550 (vs. Debreceni VSC)	300 (vs. Budaörs)
13	MTK Budapest	4,400	338	500 (vs. Dunaújváros)	200 (vs. Vác)
14	ELIOS Kispest NKK	3,260	251	400 (vs. Ferencváros)	100 (vs. Alba Fehérvár)
Total		158,822	873	5,500 – DVSC vs. GYŐR	100 – KISP vs. ALBA

Source: League matches: NB I 2016/2017

== Number of teams by counties ==
Pos.	County (megye)	No. of teams	Team(s)
1	Budapest (capital)	3	Ferencvárosi TC, Kispest and MTK
1	Pest	3	Budaörs, Érd and Váci NKSE
2	Fejér	2	Alba Fehérvár KC and Dunaújvárosi Kohász
2	Győr-Moson-Sopron	2	Győri ETO and Mosonmagyaróvári KC
5	Békés	1	Békéscsabai Előre
5	Hajdú-Bihar	1	Debreceni VSC
5	Somogy	1	Siófok KC
5	Szabolcs-Szatmár-Bereg	1	Kisvárdai KC

== See also ==
- 2016–17 Magyar Kupa
- 2016–17 Nemzeti Bajnokság I/B
