= Mireya González =

Spanish handball player (born 1991)

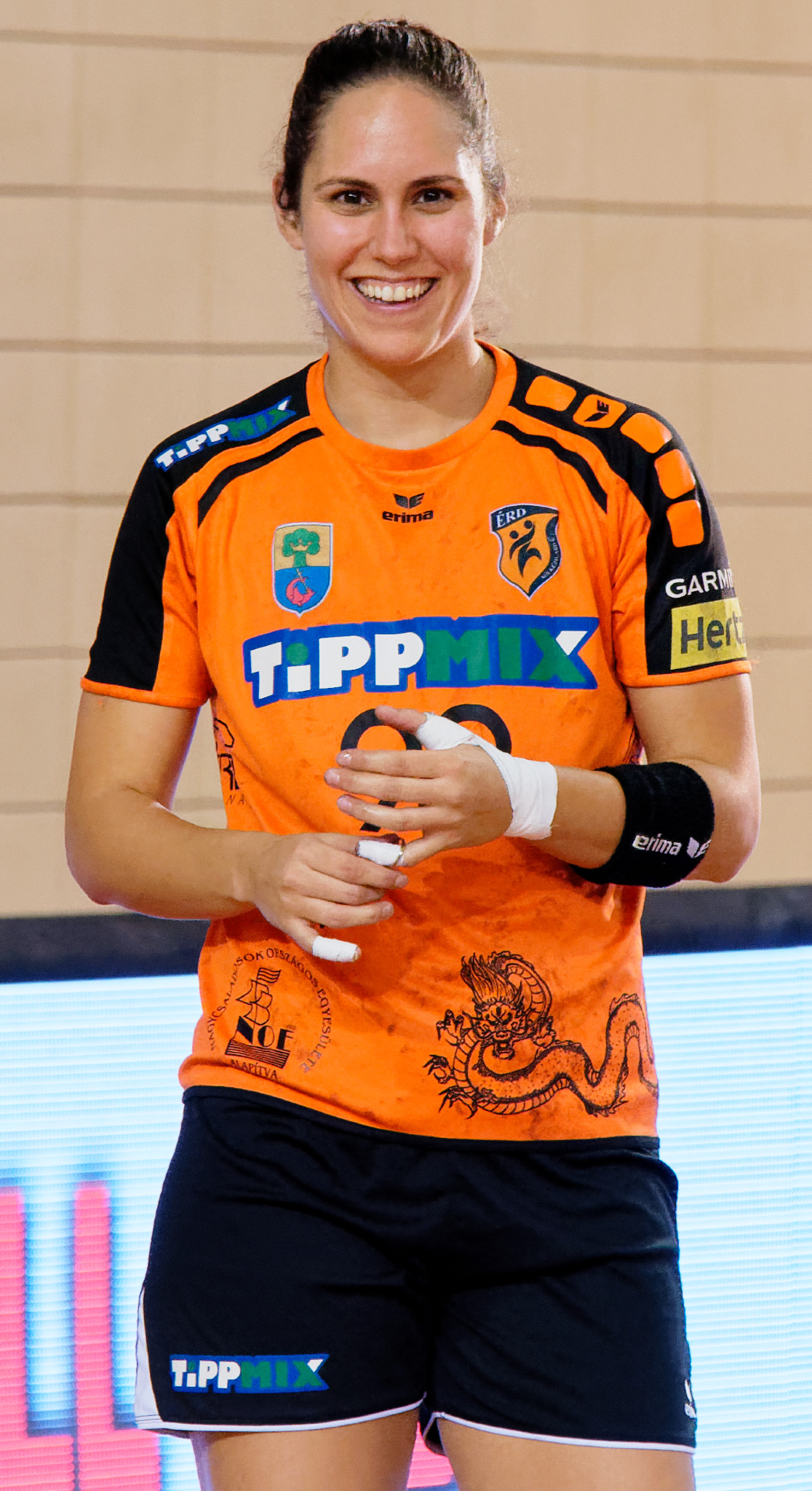
- González in 2017

Personal information
- Full name: Mireya González Álvarez
- Nationality: Spanish
- Born: 18 July 1991 (age 35) León, Spain
- Height: 1.78 m (5 ft 10 in)

Sport
- Sport: Handball
- Position: Right back
- Current club: HC Dunărea Brăila
- Number: 99

Senior clubs
- Years: Team
- 2008–2013: Club Balonmano Alcobendas
- 2013–2015: Union Mios Biganos-Bègles
- 2015–2018: Érd NK
- 2018: → Győri ETO KC (loan)
- 2018–2019: Siófok KC
- 2019–2022: SCM Râmnicu Vâlcea
- 2022–: HC Dunărea Brăila
National team
| Years | Team | Apps | (Gls) |
| 2012– | Spain | 129 | (267) |
Title
| 2018 | EHF Champions League | Gold | |
| 2019 | EHF Cup | Gold | |
| 2015 | EHF Challenge Cup | Gold | |
Medal record
Women's handball
Representing Spain
World Championship
| Silver medal – second place | 2019 Japan |
- Updated on 15 September 2024

Mireya González Álvarez (Note: In this Spanish name, the first or paternal surname is González and the second or maternal family name is Álvarez.) (born July 18, 1991, in León) is a Spanish handballer who plays as a right back for the Romanian club HC Dunărea Brăila and the Spanish national team.

Among her most important achievements are winning the World Championship runner-up title in 2019 with the Spanish team and winning all three European competitions: The Women's EHF Champions League, EHF Cup, and EHF Challenge Cup.

== Club career ==
2008 - 2012: Player for Club Balonmano Alcobendas.

2012 - 2015: Played in France with the team Union Mios Biganos-Bègles, with which she was a finalist in the Coupe de la Ligue 2014-2015 and champion of the EHF Challenge Cup in 2015.

2015 - 2018: Moved to Hungary to first with Érd NK, with which she was a finalist in the Magyar Kupa 2015-2016 and finished 3rd in the Hungarian Championship in the 2015-2016 and 2016-2017 seasons. In 2018, she played with Győri Audi ETO KC, with which she was champion of the Magyar Kupa, the Hungarian Championship, and the EHF Champions League.

2018 - 2019: Played with the club Siófok KC and obtained again finished 3rd in the Hungarian Championship, while completing her European triple crown by winning the EHF Cup.

2019 - 2022: Moved to Romania to play with the SCM Râmnicu Vâlcea team, with which she won the Supercupa României in 2020, was a finalist in 2019, won the Cupa României in 2020, and finished 3rd in Liga Națională in 2021 and 2022. She participated in The Women's EHF Champions League during the 2019-2020 and 2020-2021 seasons, being nominated for Best Right Back in both seasons.

2022–Present: Plays for HC Dunărea Brăila, with which she has been a finalist in the Cupa României in 2024, 3rd in the Cupa României in 2023, and 3rd in the Supercupa României. She also played in the final four of the EHF Cup in 2024.

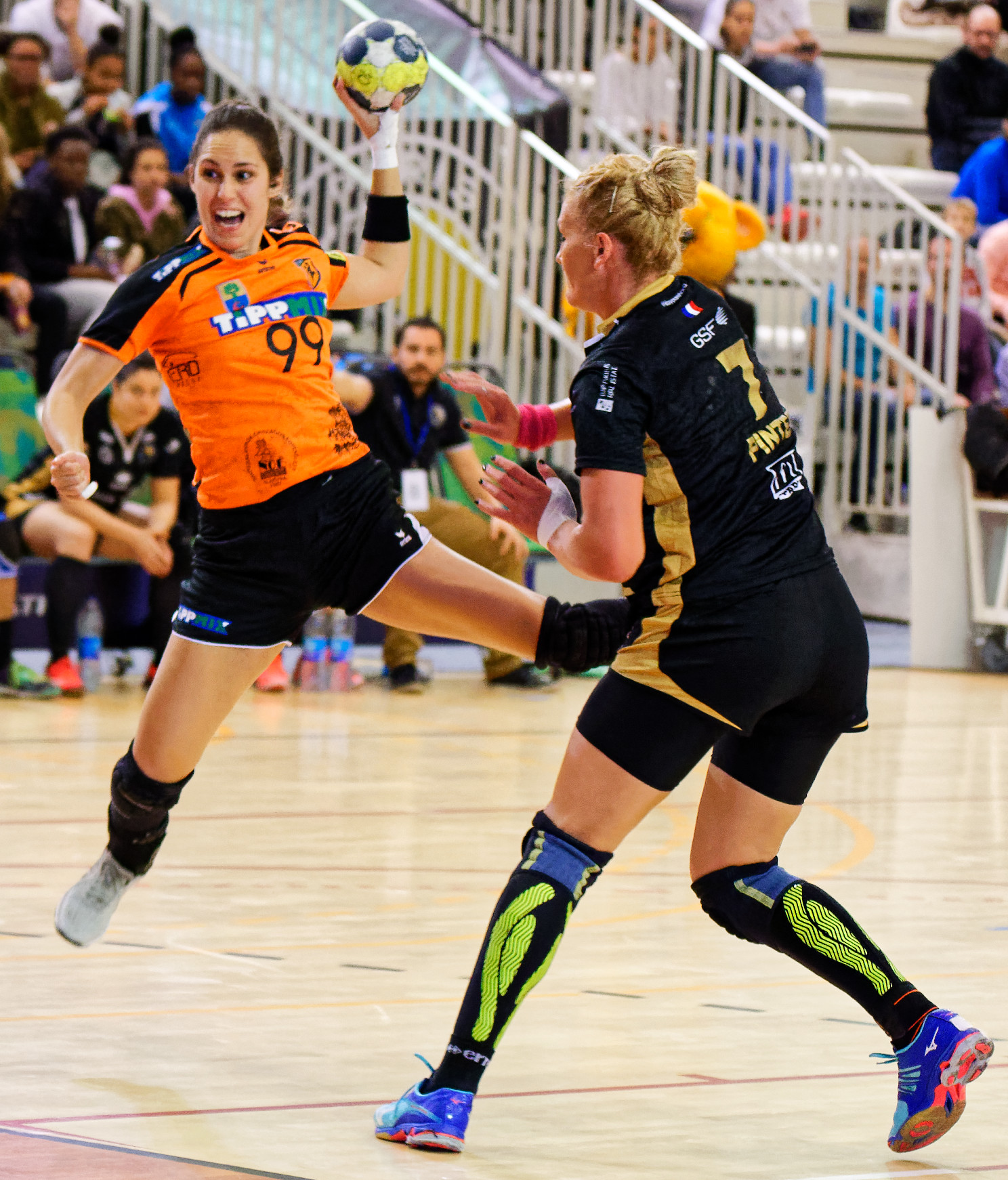
González playing for Érd NK in November 2017

== International honours ==
With the Spanish Handball Team, she has been capped 121 times and has scored 246 goals to date. Her greatest success has been the silver medal at the Kumamoto 2019 World Championship.

=== Notable Participations ===
- Mediterranean Games 2013: 8 goals.
- European Championship 2014: 2 goals.
- European Championship 2016: 9 goals.
- World Championship 2017: 13 goals.
- European Championship 2018: 35 goals.
- World Championship 2019: 27 goals.
- European Championship 2020: 12 goals.
- Tokyo 2020 Olympic Games: 8 goals.
- World Championship 2021: 3 goals.
- European Championship 2022: 7 goals.
- World Championship 2023: 20 goals.

== Achievements ==
- Silver: World Championship Kumamoto 2019
- Gold: EHF Champions League 2018
- Gold: EHF Cup 2019
- Gold: EHF Challenge Cup 2015
- Gold: Magyar Kupa 2018
- Gold: Hungarian Championship 2018
- Gold: Supercupa României 2020
- Gold: Cupa României 2020
- Silver: Coupe de la Ligue 2015
- Silver: Magyar Kupa 2016
- Silver: Supercupa României 2019
- Silver: Cupa României 2024
- Bronze: Hungarian Championship 2016
- Bronze: Hungarian Championship 2017
- Bronze: Hungarian Championship 2019
- Bronze: Liga Națională 2021
- Bronze: Liga Națională 2022
- Bronze: Cupa României 2023
- Bronze: Supercupa României 2023
