= Vukicevic =

Vukicevic may refer to:

- Vukićević
- Vukičević
