= 2017–18 Magyar Kupa (women's handball) =

Hungarian women's handball season

Tournament details
- Country: Hungary
- Dates: 30 August 2017 – 1 April 2018
- Teams: 42

Final positions
- Champions: Győri Audi ETO KC (13th title)
- Runners-up: Érd

Tournament statistics
- Matches played: 42 + 4 (Final four)

The 2017–18 Magyar Kupa, known as (Hungarian: TippMix Török Bódog női Magyar Kupa) for sponsorship reasons, was the 60th edition of the tournament.

== Schedule ==
The rounds of the 2017–18 competition are scheduled as follows:

Round	Draw date and time	Matches
Round I	3 August 2017, 13:00 CEST	20 September 2017
Round II	26 September 2017, 13:00 CEST	4 October 2017
Round III	10 October 2017, 13:00 CEST	8 November 2017
Round IV	14 November 2017, 11:15 CET	17 January 2018
Round V	23 January 2018, 11:15 CET	7 February 2018
Final four	15 February 2018, 11:00 CET	16–17 March 2018

== Matches ==
A total of 42 matches will take place, starting with First round on 30 August 2017 and culminating with the Final on 1 April 2018 at the László Papp Budapest Sports Arena in Budapest.

=== Round I ===
The first round ties are scheduled for 30 August – 21 September 2017.

Team 1	Score	Team 2
30 August
Hajdúböszörményi TE (II)	19–28	NKK Balmazújváros (I/B)
5 September
Gárdony-Pázmánd NKSE (I/B)	21–31	Szent István OTP (I/B)
6 September
Nyíradony VVTK (I/B)	32–27	Hajdúnánás SK (I/B)
13 September
K. Szeged SE (I/B)	24–37	Orosházi NKC (I/B)
19 September
Marcali VSZSE (I/B)	29–39	Mohácsi TE (I/B)
Hódmezővásárhelyi LKC (I/B)	23–25	PC Trade Szeged KKSE (I/B)
20 September
Pénzügyőr SE (I/B)	31–24	Gyömrő VSK (I/B)
Szombathelyi KKA (I/B)	48–19	VKL SE Győr (I/B)
EURONOVEX USE (II)	28–45	Szentendrei NKE (I/B)
Kozármisleny SE (I/B)	25–18	Csurgói NKC (I/B)
Eu-Fire Mosonmagyaróvár (I/B)	58–21	Szombathelyi Haladás (I/B)
Salgótarjáni Strandépítők (II)	30–41	Gödi SE (I/B)
VSK Tököl (II)	27–20	Csepel DSE (II)
21 September
NEKA (I/B)	25–22	Szekszárdi FGKC (I/B)

=== Round II ===
The second round ties are scheduled for 29 September – 4 October 2017.

Team 1	Score	Team 2
29 September
PC Trade Szeged KKSE (I/B)	20–25	Hufbau-Akker Kecskeméti NKSE (I)
3 October
Mohácsi TE (I/B)	30–30 (a)	NEKA (I/B)
Kozármisleny SE (I/B)	12–39	Siófok KC (I)
4 October
Eszterházy KFSC (I/B)	15–37	GVM Europe-Vác (I)
MTK Budapest (I)	32–28	Budaörs Handball (I)
Pénzügyőr SE (I/B)	21–25	Szent István OTP (I/B)
Nyíradony VVTK (I/B)	23–34	DVSC-TvP (I)
Szombathelyi KKA (I/B)	27–31	Alba Fehérvár KC (I)
Eu-Fire Mosonmagyaróvár (I/B)	30–21	Rinyamenti KC (I/B)
Orosházi NKC (I/B)	26–28	EUbility Group-Békéscsaba (I)
Pilisvörösvári KSK (I/B)	22–30	Vasas SC (I)
VSK Tököl (II)	28–41	Kispest NKK (I)
NKK Balmazújváros (I/B)	21–38	Kisvárdai KC (I)
Szentendrei NKE (I/B)	32–34	Gödi SE (I/B)

=== Round III ===
The third round ties are scheduled for 25 October – 10 November 2017.

Team 1	Score	Team 2
25 October
NEKA (I/B)	23–31	Érd (I)
7 November
Gödi SE (I/B)	24–34	EUbility Group-Békéscsaba (I)
Vasas SC (I)	21–31	DVSC-TvP (I)
8 November
Eu-Fire Mosonmagyaróvár (I/B)	21–32	Siófok KC (I)
Szent István OTP (I/B)	28–36	Dunaújvárosi Kohász KA (I)
Kisvárdai KC (I)	27–19	Hufbau-Akker Kecskeméti NKSE (I)
Kispest NKK (I/B)	31–43	GVM Europe-Vác (I)
10 November
Alba Fehérvár KC (I)	31–27	MTK Budapest (I)

=== Round IV ===
The fourth round ties are scheduled for 17–20 January 2018.

Team 1	Score	Team 2
17 January
Kisvárdai KC (I)	28–31	GVM Europe-Vác (I)
Alba Fehérvár KC (I)	23–30	Siófok KC (I)
20 January
EUbility Group-Békéscsaba (I)	31–28	Dunaújvárosi Kohász KA (I)
Érd (I)	32–21	DVSC-TvP (I)

=== Round V ===
The fifth round ties are scheduled for 7–8 February 2018.

Team 1	Score	Team 2
7 February
Érd (I)	26–25	GVM Europe-Vác (I)
8 February
EUbility Group-Békéscsaba (I)	30–30 (a)	Siófok KC (I)

== Final four ==
The final four will be held on 31 March – 1 April 2018 at the László Papp Budapest Sports Arena in Budapest.

Semi-finals
31 March, 13:00
FTC-Rail Cargo Hungaria	25 (4)
Győri Audi ETO KC (pen.)	25 (5)
31 March, 15:15
Siófok KC	23 (3)
Érd (pen.)	23 (4)

Final
1 April, 16:00
Győri Audi ETO KC	27
Érd	23
Bronze medal match
1 April, 13:45
FTC-Rail Cargo Hungaria	25
Siófok KC	21

=== Awards ===
- Most valuable player:
- Best Goalkeeper:

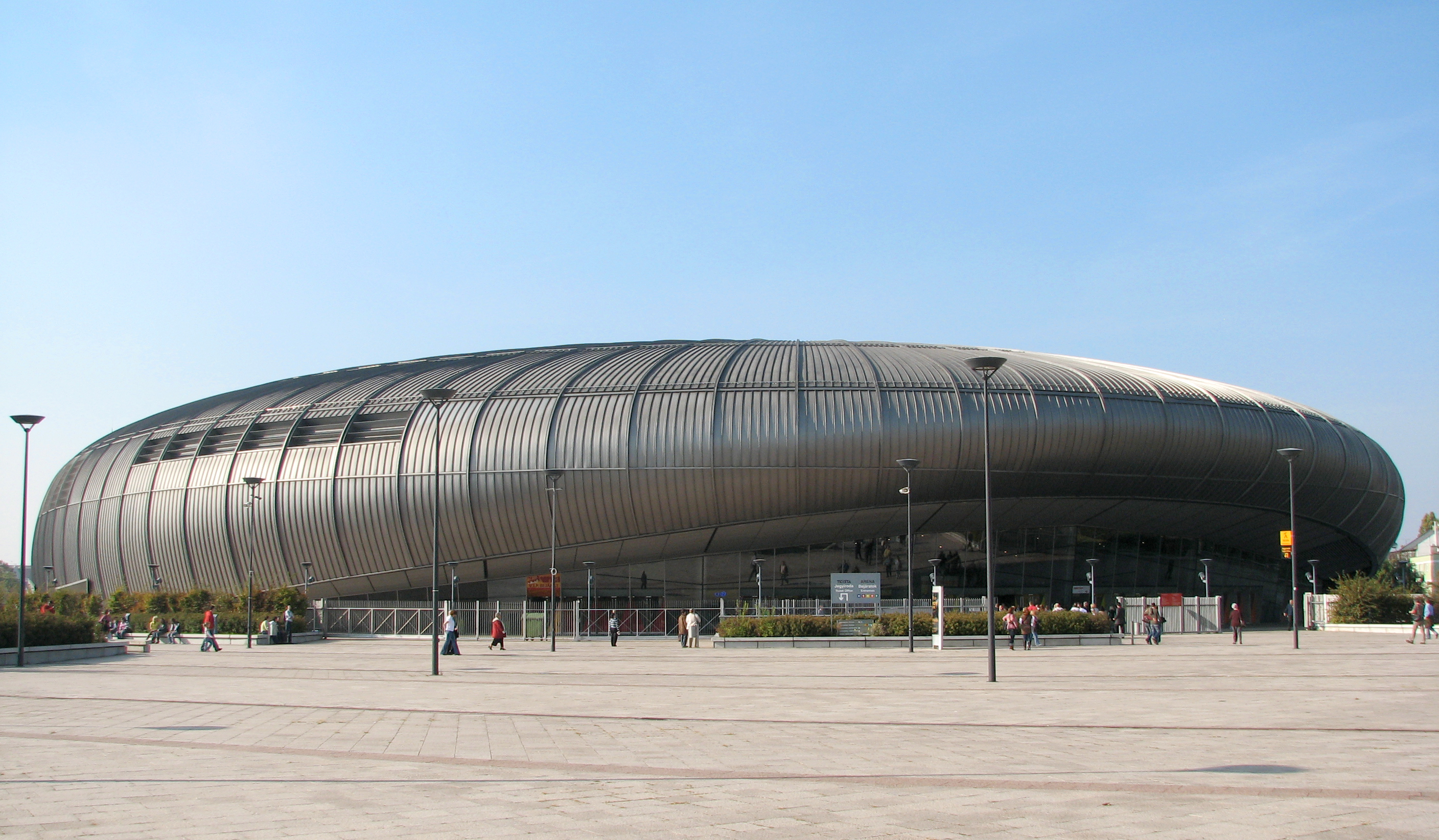
László Papp Sports Arena hosted the tournament

=== Semi-finals ===
31 March 2018
13:00 (CEST)
FTC-Rail Cargo Hungaria
29 – 30 (p)
Győri Audi ETO KC
László Papp Budapest Sports Arena, Budapest
Attendance: 9,000
Referees: Andorka, Hucker
Lukács 6
(12–15)
Amorim, Groot 6
1× (yellow card) 2× (suspension)
Report
2× (yellow card) 4× (suspension)

FT: 25–25 Pen: 4–5

31 March 2018
15:15 (CEST)
Siófok KC
26 – 27 (p)
Érd
László Papp Budapest Sports Arena, Budapest
Attendance: 5,500
Referees: Bonifert, Oláh
Such 6
(11–9)
Krpež-Slezak 8
2× (yellow card) 6× (suspension)
Report
1× (yellow card) 2× (suspension)

FT: 23–23 Pen: 3–4

=== Bronze medal match ===
1 April 2018; 14:00 (CEST)	FTC-Rail Cargo Hungaria	25 – 21	Siófok KC	László Papp Budapest Sports Arena, Budapest; Attendance: 6,000; Referees: Altmár, Horváth
1 April 2018; 14:00 (CEST)	Schatzl, van der Heijden 5	(11–14)	Nze Minko 8	László Papp Budapest Sports Arena, Budapest; Attendance: 6,000; Referees: Altmár, Horváth
1 April 2018; 14:00 (CEST)	2× (yellow card) 2× (suspension)	Report	3× (yellow card)	László Papp Budapest Sports Arena, Budapest; Attendance: 6,000; Referees: Altmár, Horváth

=== Final ===
1 April 2018; 16:30 (CEST)	Győri Audi ETO KC	27 – 23	Érd	László Papp Budapest Sports Arena, Budapest; Attendance: 7,000; Referees: Bacs, Bóna
1 April 2018; 16:30 (CEST)	Görbicz 7	(12–13)	Krpež-Slezak 6	László Papp Budapest Sports Arena, Budapest; Attendance: 7,000; Referees: Bacs, Bóna
1 April 2018; 16:30 (CEST)	3× (yellow card) 2× (suspension)	Report	3× (yellow card) 4× (suspension)	László Papp Budapest Sports Arena, Budapest; Attendance: 7,000; Referees: Bacs, Bóna

2017–18 Magyar Kupa
Winner

Győri Audi ETO KC
13th title

Grimsbø, É. Kiss (goalkeepers), Afentaler, Althaus, Amorim, Bódi, Broch, Fodor,
González, Görbicz (c), Groot, Hansen, Knedlíková, Pál, Puhalák, Varga
Head coach
Ambros Martín

==== Final standings ====
	Team
	Győri Audi ETO KC
Silver medal	Érd
Bronze medal	FTC-Rail Cargo Hungaria
	Siófok KC

== See also ==
- 2017–18 Nemzeti Bajnokság I
- 2017–18 Nemzeti Bajnokság I/B
- 2017–18 Nemzeti Bajnokság II
