= 2017–18 Nemzeti Bajnokság I (women's handball) =

K&H női liga
- Season: 2017–18
- Champions: Győr (14th title)
- Relegated: Kecskemét; Vasas
- Champions League: Győr; Ferencváros
- EHF Cup: Érd; Dunaújváros; Siófok; Vác
- Matches: 182
- Goals: 9,942 (54.63 per match)
- Top goalscorer: Katarina Krpež-Slezak (202 goals)
- Biggest home win: Győr 40–15 Vasas (24 October 2017); Győr 39–14 Békéscsaba (23 May 2018)
- Biggest away win: Kecskemét 19–46 Ferencváros (20 May 2018)
- Highest scoring: Vác 48–28 Békéscsaba (7 April 2018)

The 2017–18 Nemzeti Bajnokság I (known as the K&H női kézilabda liga for sponsorship reasons) is the 67th season of the Nemzeti Bajnokság I, Hungarian premier Handball league.

== Teams ==
As in the previous season, 14 teams played in the 2017–18 season. After the 2016–17 season, Mosonmagyaróvári KC SE and Kispest NKK were relegated to the 2017–18 Nemzeti Bajnokság I/B. They were replaced by two clubs from the 2016–17 Nemzeti Bajnokság I/B, Kecskeméti NKSE and Vasas SC.

Location of teams in 2017-18 Nemzeti Bajnokság I
Location of Budapest teams

Team	Location	Arena	Capacity
Alba Fehérvár KC	Székesfehérvár	KÖFÉM Sportcsarnok	1,000
Békéscsabai Előre NKSE	Békéscsaba	Városi Sportcsarnok	2,300
Budaörs Handball	Budaörs	Városi Uszoda és Sportcsarnok	1,000
Debreceni VSC	Debrecen	Hódos Imre Sportcsarnok	1,800
Dunaújvárosi Kohász KA	Dunaújváros	Városi Sportcsarnok	1,200
Érd HK	Érd	Érd Aréna	1,800
Ferencvárosi TC	Budapest	Elek Gyula Aréna	1,300
Győri ETO KC	Győr	Audi Aréna	5,554
Kecskeméti NKSE	Kecskemét	Messzi István Sportcsarnok	1,800
Kisvárdai KC	Kisvárda	Városi Sportcsarnok	750
MTK Budapest	Budapest	Elektromos csarnok	700
Siófok KC	Siófok	Beszédes József Sportcsarnok; Kiss Szilárd Sportcsarnok	550; 1,500
Vasas SC	Budapest	Elektromos csarnok	700
Váci NKSE	Vác	Városi Sportcsarnok	620

=== Personnel and kits ===
Following is the list of clubs competing in 2017–18 Nemzeti Bajnokság I, with their president, head coach, kit manufacturer and shirt sponsor.

Team	President	Head coach	Kit manufacturer	Shirt sponsor(s)
Alba Fehérvár	Imre Balassi	(Hungary) Rita Deli	hummel	tippmix^{1}, Avis
Békéscsabai Előre	Károly Szabó	(Hungary) Roland Horváth	Ziccer	tippmix^{1}, bmw-glass.hu, Budapest Bank
Budaörs	Tamás Neukum	(Hungary) Attila Mihály	Made by club	tippmix^{1}
Debreceni VSC	Vilmos Köstner	(Hungary) Gergő Vida	adidas	tippmix^{1}, TvP
Dunaújvárosi Kohász	István Szemenyei	(Hungary) László György	hummel	tippmix^{1}, BH
Érd	Norbert Tekauer	(Hungary) Edina Szabó	Erima	tippmix^{1}
Ferencváros	Gábor Kubatov	(Hungary) Gábor Elek	Nike	tippmix^{1}, Rail Cargo Hungaria, Budapest
Győri ETO	dr. Csaba Bartha	(Spain) Ambros Martín	adidas	Audi, Győr, tippmix^{1}
Kecskemét	Zsolt Orell	(Hungary) György Marosán	hummel	tippmix^{1}, hufbau*akker
Kisvárda	Tamás Major	(Montenegro) Vlatko Đonović	adidas	tippmix^{1}, Master Good, Kisvárda Várfürdő,
MTK Budapest	Tamás Deutsch	(Hungary) Vladimir Golovin	Nike	tippmix^{1}
Siófok	János Fodor	(Denmark) Lars Rasmussen	hummel	tippmix^{1}
Vasas	László Markovits	(Hungary) Márta Varga	Erima	tippmix^{1}
Vác	Erika Kirsner	(Hungary) Zoltán Szilágyi	hummel	tippmix^{1}, IPress Center

==== Managerial changes ====
Team	Outgoing manager	Manner of departure	Date of vacancy	Position in table	Replaced by	Date of appointment
Siófok	(Hungary) Roland Horváth	Mutual consent	End of 2016–17 season	Pre-season	(Denmark) Lars Rasmussen	17 July 2017
Békéscsaba	(Hungary) László Skaliczki	Mutual consent	31 October 2017	14th	(Hungary) Csaba Fábián (caretaker)	1 November 2017
Békéscsaba	(Hungary) Csaba Fábián	End of interim spell	12 November 2017	14th	(Hungary) Roland Horváth	13 November 2017
Debrecen	(Slovenia) Tone Tiselj	Mutual consent	6 January 2018	9th	(Hungary) Gergő Vida	8 January 2018
Kisvárda	(Hungary) Eszter Mátéfi	Mutual consent	25 January 2018	10th	(Montenegro) Vlatko Đonović	29 January 2018
Vasas	(Hungary) Péter Kovács	Sacked	14 March 2018	13th	(Hungary) Márta Varga	15 March 2018

== League table ==
Pos	Team	Pld	W	D	L	GF	GA	GD	Pts	Qualification or relegation
1	Győri Audi ETO KC (C)	26	25	0	1	860	568	+292	50 (Note: Győri Audi ETO KC is ahead of FTC-Rail Cargo Hungaria on head-to-head results: Győr–FTC 26–24, FTC–Győr 27–25.)	Qualification to Champions League group stage
2	FTC-Rail Cargo Hungaria	26	25	0	1	878	587	+291	50	Qualification to Champions League group stage
3	Érd	26	19	0	7	736	626	+110	38	Qualification to EHF Cup third qualifying round
4	Dunaújvárosi Kohász KA	26	17	2	7	734	642	+92	36	Qualification to EHF Cup second qualifying round
5	Siófok KC	26	17	1	8	753	695	+58	35	Qualification to EHF Cup second qualifying round
6	GVM Europe-Vác	26	15	1	10	805	735	+70	31	Qualification to EHF Cup first qualifying round
7	Kisvárda Master Good SE	26	13	2	11	632	635	−3	28	
8	Alba Fehérvár KC	26	9	4	13	682	716	−34	22 (Note: Alba Fehérvár KC is ahead of DVSC-TvP on head-to-head results: Alba–DVSC 25–25, DVSC–Alba 25–27.)	
9	DVSC-TvP	26	10	2	14	662	706	−44	22	
10	Budaörs Handball	26	8	1	17	710	792	−82	17	
11	MTK Budapest	26	5	4	17	655	760	−105	14	
12	EUbility Group-Békéscsaba	26	5	1	20	654	812	−158	11	
13	Hufbau-Akker Kecskeméti NKSE (R)	26	3	1	22	595	831	−236	7	Relegation to Nemzeti Bajnokság I/B
14	Vasas SC (R)	26	1	1	24	586	837	−251	3	Relegation to Nemzeti Bajnokság I/B

Updated to match(es) played on 27 May 2018. Source: keziszovettseg.hu
Rules for classification: 1) Points; 2) Head-to-head points; 3) Head-to-head goal difference; 4) Goal difference; 5) Goals scored; 6) Matches won; 7) Draw (Note: Head-to-head record is used only after all the matches between the teams in question have been played)
(C) Champions; (R) Relegated

=== Schedule and results ===
In the table below the home teams are listed on the left and the away teams along the top.

Home \ Away	ALBA	BÉK	BUD	DVSC	DKKA	ÉRD	FTC	GYŐR	KECS	KKC	MTK	SKC	VAS	VÁC
Alba Fehérvár KC		33–23	29–28	25–25	23–24	21–18	23–29	18–38	37–25	23–24	29–29	31–31	32–24	29–30
Békéscsabai ENKSE	28–22		25–27	23–29	22–34	23–32	25–37	26–35	30–25	24–32	29–26	31–33	32–24	22–33
Budaörs Handball	30–30	25–26		23–31	28–37	24–34	22–32	33–47	35–21	23–24	33–30	36–27	35–29	28–34
Debreceni VSC	25–27	31–28	29–26		22–24	21–24	24–34	23–33	30–24	24–24	30–27	22–28	32–23	29–28
Dunaújvárosi Kohász KA	30–27	38–24	33–22	24–18		26–30	25–35	26–28	34–20	25–21	30–20	26–32	34–21	27–25
Érd	35–22	35–24	29–21	29–24	28–27		29–32	27–34	31–22	31–25	23–17	22–20	35–22	23–24
Ferencvárosi TC	32–18	22–19	42–22	28–24	30–23	32–15		27–25	35–15	36–22	37–25	27–24	39–22	42–24
Győri ETO KC	35–17	39–14	36–23	36–16	29–17	31–26	26–24		39–19	30–26	30–20	31–20	40–15	39–25
Kecskeméti NKSE	25–29	31–27	24–28	25–26	21–32	22–30	19–46	22–30		23–25	30–28	24–26	25–24	22–39
Kisvárdai KC	19–17	24–18	22–23	29–23	23–24	21–27	18–34	17–25	35–20		26–21	26–31	30–21	28–27
MTK Budapest	25–32	30–30	37–31	29–23	26–26	21–30	20–36	25–40	23–19	27–27		25–28	24–20	27–30
Siófok KC	34–29	39–29	34–25	25–22	21–23	22–32	29–37	21–27	44–23	19–18	34–18		35–20	34–31
Vasas SC	17–34	28–24	19–32	25–31	17–36	21–37	21–39	18–26	25–25	16–21	25–29	33–34		30–42
Váci NKSE	33–25	48–28	31–27	35–28	29–29	27–24	28–34	23–31	43–24	23–25	32–26	27–28	34–26	

Legend: Blue = home team win; Yellow = draw; Red = away team win.

== Season statistics ==
=== Top goalscorers ===
As of 27 May 2018.

Rank	Player	Team	Goals	Matches
1	(Serbia) Katarina Krpež-Slezak	Érd	202	26
2	(Hungary) Szabina Karnik	MTK	150	27
3	(Croatia) Ćamila Mičijević	Dunaújváros	147	26
4	(Russia) (Hungary) Krisztina Triscsuk	Kisvárda	144	26
5	(Hungary) Edina Szabó	Kecskemét	141	25
6	(Serbia) Jovana Kovačević	Békéscsaba	137	25
7	(Hungary) Mercédesz Walfisch	Békéscsaba	133	26
8	(Hungary) Szandra Szöllősi-Zácsik	Budaörs	131	23
9	(France) Estelle Nze Minko	Siófok	124	23
10	(Netherlands) Laura van der Heijden	Ferencváros	121	26

=== Attendances ===
Pos	Team	Total	High	Low	Average	Change
1	Győri ETO KC	43,660	5,307 (vs. Ferencváros)	2,037 (vs. Kecskemét)	3,358	+16,27%
2	Érd	19,330	2,200 (two matches)	1,000 (two matches)	1,487	+11,72%
3	DVSC-TvP	18,800	5,500 (vs. Győri ETO)	800 (two matches)	1,446	−5,06%
4	EUbility Group-Békéscsaba	12,800	1,800 (vs. Győri ETO)	500 (vs. Vác)	984	+4,90%
5	Kisvárda Master Good SE	11,183	1,000 (three matches)	700 (vs. Vasas)	860	+11,98%
6	Budaörs Handball	10,430	1,063 (vs. Érd)	640 (vs. Vasas)	802	+14,74%
7	FTC-Rail Cargo Hungaria	10,050	1,200 (three matches)	400 (vs. MTK)	773	+16,24%
8	Hufbau-Akker Kecskeméti NKSE	8,500	1,900 (vs. Győri ETO)	300 (vs. Alba Fehérvár)	653	+94,93%^{1}
9	Siófok KC	8,320	1,000 (vs. Dunaújváros)	400 (vs. DVSC)	640	+37,93%^{2}
10	Dunaújvárosi Kohász KA	8,200	950 (vs. Győri ETO)	150 (vs. Vasas)	631	+3,78%
11	Alba Fehérvár KC	7,075	870 (vs. Győri ETO)	300 (two matches)	544	−15,66%
12	GVM Europe-Vác	6,800	620 (vs. FTC)	380 (vs. MTK)	523	0,00%
13	Vasas SC	5,000	500 (vs. Alba Fehérvár)	250 (vs. MTK)	384	+140,00%^{1}
14	MTK Budapest	3,800	350 (five matches)	150 (vs. Alba Fehérvár)	292	−13,61%
Total		173,948	5,500 (DVSC vs. GYŐR)	150 (two matches)	956	+9,51%

Updated to games played on 23 May 2018. Source: League matches: NB I 2017/2018
Attendance numbers without playoff matches.

Notes:
- 1: Team played last season in Nemzeti Bajnokság I/B.
- 2: Siófoki KC played the previous season at Beszédes József Sportcsarnok.

=== Number of teams by counties ===
Pos.	County (megye)	No. of teams	Team(s)
1	Budapest (capital)	3	Ferencvárosi TC, MTK and Vasas SC
1	Pest	3	Budaörs Handball, Érd and Váci NKSE
3	Fejér	2	Alba Fehérvár KC and Dunaújvárosi Kohász KA
4	Bács-Kiskun	1	Kecskeméti NKSE
4	Békés	1	Békéscsabai Előre NKSE
4	Győr-Moson-Sopron	1	Győri ETO
4	Hajdú-Bihar	1	Debreceni VSC
4	Somogy	1	Siófok KC
4	Szabolcs-Szatmár-Bereg	1	Kisvárdai KC

== See also ==
- 2017–18 Magyar Kupa
- 2017–18 Nemzeti Bajnokság I/B
- 2017–18 Nemzeti Bajnokság II
