= Vukčević =

Vukčević (Serbian Cyrillic: Вукчевић, pronounced [ʋǔktʃeʋitɕ]) is a Serbo-Croatian patronymic surname, derived from the male given name Vukac. Notable people with the surname include:

- Andrija Vukčević (born 1996), Montenegrin footballer
- Boris Vukčević (born 1990), Croatian-born German footballer
- Dušan Vukčević (born 1975), Serbian basketball player
- Marina Vukčević-Rajčić (born 1993), Montenegrin handball player
- Milenko Vukčević (born 1966), Yugoslav footballer
- Nenad Vukčević (born 1974), Montenegrin footballer
- Nikola Vukčević (disambiguation), multiple people
- Nikolina Vukčević (born 2000), Montenegrin handball player
- Radomir Vukčević (1941–2014), Yugoslav footballer
- Risto Vukčević (1929–1994), Montenegrin politician
- Sara Vukčević (born 1992), Montenegrin handball player
- Simon Vukčević (born 1986), Montenegrin footballer
- Tristan Vukčević (born 2003), basketball player
- Vojislav Vukčević (1938–2016), Serbian Minister of the Diaspora
- Žarko Vukčević (born 1957), Montenegrin footballer

== See also ==
- Vukcevich
- Vukičević
- Vukićević
