= 2017–18 Nemzeti Bajnokság I/B (women's handball) =

NB I/B női felnőtt
- Season: 2017–18
- Promoted: Eszterházy KFSC (East); Eu-Fire Mosonmagyaróvár (West)
- Relegated: Hódmezővásárhelyi LKC (East); K. Szeged SE; Gyömrő VSK; Csurgói NKC (West); Marcali VSZSE; VKLSE Győr
- Top goalscorer: Zsófia Lévai (209 goals) - East; Dorina Kovács (209 goals) - West

The 2017–18 Nemzeti Bajnokság I/B is the 50th season of the Nemzeti Bajnokság I/B, Hungary's second tier Handball league.

== Team information ==
There are 14–14 clubs in the 2 group, with three-three promoted teams from Nemzeti Bajnokság II.

=== Team changes ===
Promoted from 2016–17 Nemzeti Bajnokság II

- VKLSE Győr (North-west)
- Gyömrő VSK (South)

Relegated from 2016–17 Nemzeti Bajnokság I

- Mosonmagyaróvári KC
- Kispest NKK

Relegated to 2017–18 Nemzeti Bajnokság II

- Dunaújvárosi Kohász KA II. (South-west)
- FTC II. - NYCS

Promoted to 2017–18 Nemzeti Bajnokság I

- Vasas SC
- Kecskeméti NKSE

=== Stadia and locations ===
Location of teams in 2017-18 Nemzeti Bajnokság I/B (West)
Location of teams in 2017-18 Nemzeti Bajnokság I/B (East)

==== Western Group ====
The following 14 clubs compete in the NB I/B (Western) during the 2017–18 season:

Team	Location	Arena
Csurgói NKC	Csurgó	Sótonyi László Sportcsarnok
Győri ETO KC (U18)	Győr	Audi Aréna
Kozármisleny SE	Kozármisleny	Városi Sportcsarnok
Marcali VSZSE	Marcali	Városi Sportcsarnok
Mohácsi TE	Mohács	Városi Sportcsarnok
Mosonmagyaróvári KC	Mosonmagyaróvár	UFM Aréna
NEKA	Balatonboglár	Urányi János Sportcsarnok
Pázmánd NKSE	Gárdony	Ált. Isk. Sportcsarnok
Pilisvörösvári KSK	Pilisvörösvár	PEMÜ Sportcsanok
Rinyamenti KC	Nagyatád	Városi Sportcsarnok
Szekszárdi FGKC	Szekszárd	Városi Sportcsarnok
Szombathelyi Haladás VSE	Szombathely	Városi Sportcsarnok, Bük
Szombathelyi KKA	Szombathely	Egyetemi Sportcsarnok
VKL SE Győr	Győr	Kulturális és Sportközpont

==== Eastern Group ====
The following 14 clubs compete in the NB I/B (Eastern) during the 2017–18 season:

Team	Location	Arena
NKK Balmazújváros	Balmazújváros	Kőnig Rendezvényközpont
Eszterházy KFSC	Eger	Főiskola Sportcsarnok
Gödi SE	Göd	Balázsovits János spcs.
Gyömrő VSK	Gyömrő	Ignácz Ilona Sportcsarnok
Hajdúnánás SK	Hajdúnánás	Somorjai László Sportcsarnok
Hódmezővásárhelyi LKC	Hódmezővásárhely	Balogh Imsi spcs.
K. Szeged SE	Szeged	Városi stadion
Kispest NKK	Budapest, XIX. ker	Soroksári Sportcsarnok
Nyíradony VVTK	Nyíradony	Városi Sportcsarnok
Orosházi NKC	Orosháza	Eötvös Sportcsarnok
Pénzügyőr SE	Budapest, X. ker	Pénzügyőr Sportcsarnok
Szeged KKSE	Szeged	Városi Sportcsarnok
Szent István SE	Budapest, IX. ker	Építők Sportcsarnok
Szentendrei NKE	Szentendre	Móricz Zsigmond Gimnázium

== League table ==
=== Western Group ===
Pos	Team	Pld	W	D	L	GF	GA	GD	Pts	Promotion or relegation
1	Eu-Fire Mosonmagyaróvár (C, P)	26	25	0	1	905	485	+420	50	Promotion to Nemzeti Bajnokság I
2	NEKA	26	23	0	3	816	589	+227	46	
3	Swietelsky-Szombathely	26	20	0	6	839	656	+183	40	
4	Kozármisleny SE	26	17	2	7	735	651	+84	36	
5	Szekszárdi FGKC	26	14	3	9	733	657	+76	31	
6	Rinyamenti KC	26	15	1	10	753	739	+14	31	
7	Győri Audi ETO KC (U18)	26	14	1	11	787	714	+73	29	
8	Mohácsi TE	26	12	4	10	729	710	+19	28	
9	Gárdony-Pázmánd NKSE	26	12	0	14	651	714	−63	24	
10	Szombathelyi Haladás	26	9	1	16	830	900	−70	19	
11	Pilisvörösvári KSK	26	7	0	19	664	784	−120	13 (Note: 1 point deducted?)	
12	Csurgói NKC (R)	26	5	0	21	611	777	−166	10	Relegation to Nemzeti Bajnokság II
13	Marcali VSZSE (R)	26	2	0	24	574	892	−318	4	Relegation to Nemzeti Bajnokság II
14	VKL SE Győr (R)	26	1	0	25	658	1016	−358	2	Relegation to Nemzeti Bajnokság II

(C) Champions; (P) Promoted; (R) Relegated

==== Schedule and results ====
In the table below the home teams are listed on the left and the away teams along the top.

Home \ Away	CsNKC	GYŐR (U18)	KOZ	MAR	MTE	MOS	NEKA	PÁZ	PKSK	RKC	SZEK	SzHAL	SzKKA	VKLSE
Csurgói NKC		26–31	20–30	23–15	21–29	15–32	26–37	23–27	27–24	21–28	23–22	29–30	22–36	39–34
Győri Audi ETO KC (U18)	36–22		40–29	34–20	28–24	20–32	23–29	35–26	27–32	27–28	25–24	49–42	26–29	48–24
Kozármisleny SE	23–19	28–20		36–22	26–26	15–23	23–30	28–18	33–22	33–26	28–23	39–33	25–27	40–21
Marcali VSZSE	32–23	19–35	21–27		26–32	21–35	23–37	22–28	25–32	20–39	19–46	25–37	20–41	26–30
Mohácsi TE	28–21	27–27	17–20	39–19		15–36	19–25	24–26	35–27	32–32	23–24	39–37	28–29	29–21
Mosonmagyaróvári KC SE	42–15	31–24	35–25	43–17	37–17		29–24	38–15	48–19	35–14	28–19	45–19	31–21	40–17
NEKA	31–21	21–20	25–18	32–15	37–26	21–20		31–21	39–22	30–20	36–23	41–23	30–20	39–25
Gárdony-Pázmánd NKSE	23–21	28–32	24–31	33–25	26–30	21–38	27–37		27–20	22–23	22–17	35–34	33–26	31–23
Pilisvörösvári KSK	23–20	22–31	24–28	28–26	27–36	14–36	27–32	16–25		23–25	23–24	30–31	21–25	43–22
Rinyamenti KC	34–21	32–26	26–29	40–24	33–24	25–40	21–34	28–25	27–24		25–27	40–32	24–28	38–34
Szekszárdi FGKC	36–25	32–20	23–23	34–18	29–29	14–28	22–24	24–22	37–22	30–25		34–34	29–28	38–24
Szombathelyi Haladás	31–29	31–35	31–33	34–30	25–34	16–37	26–25	29–23	34–37	33–34	31–37		26–41	54–39
Szombathelyi KKA	38–23	37–29	27–19	49–15	27–28	24–25	27–26	35–15	35–19	40–30	37–28	28–27		42–30
VKL SE Győr	25–36	19–39	28–46	25–29	24–39	18–41	22–43	25–28	29–43	25–36	15–37	32–50	27–42	

Legend: Blue = home team win; Yellow = draw; Red = away team win.

=== Eastern Group ===
Pos	Team	Pld	W	D	L	GF	GA	GD	Pts	Promotion or relegation
1	Eszterházy KFSC (C, P)	26	22	1	3	770	588	+182	45	Promotion to Nemzeti Bajnokság I
2	PC Trade Szeged KKSE	26	20	3	3	799	613	+186	43	
3	Szent István OTP	26	17	1	8	770	685	+85	35	
4	Orosházi NKC	26	15	3	8	756	682	+74	33	
5	Gödi SE	26	16	1	9	823	710	+113	33	
6	Kispest NKK	26	14	2	10	769	699	+70	30	
7	Pénzügyőr SE	26	12	1	13	786	798	−12	25	
8	Szentendrei NKE	26	11	2	13	733	721	+12	24	
9	Nyíradony VVTK	26	12	0	14	718	748	−30	24	
10	NKK Balmazújváros	26	10	3	13	691	717	−26	23	
11	Hajdúnánás SK	26	9	3	14	744	775	−31	21	
12	Hódmezővásárhelyi LKC (R)	26	7	3	16	650	734	−84	17	Relegation to Nemzeti Bajnokság II
13	K. Szeged SE (R)	26	5	1	20	643	837	−194	11	Relegation to Nemzeti Bajnokság II
14	Gyömrő VSK (R)	26	0	0	26	600	945	−345	0	Relegation to Nemzeti Bajnokság II

(C) Champions; (P) Promoted; (R) Relegated

==== Schedule and results ====
In the table below the home teams are listed on the left and the away teams along the top.

Home \ Away	BAL	EKF	GÖD	GyVSK	HAJ	HLKC	KISP	NYÍR	OROS	PÉNZ	KSzSE	SZKKSE	SzIST	SzNKE
NKK Balmazújváros		22–30	28–24	41–24	29–27	25–17	30–30	26–25	24–31	30–30	37–24	26–20	24–31	27–24
Eszterházy KFSC	27–17		31–25	36–21	37–21	28–15	25–22	36–20	25–24	31–19	32–26	21–28	21–30	32–24
Gödi SE	37–26	28–28		44–25	29–28	33–25	24–22	45–28	32–30	38–22	37–17	23–26	30–31	42–33
Gyömrő VSK	25–35	23–35	26–34		23–31	23–43	23–38	22–25	23–34	25–41	22–28	18–42	16–34	25–26
Hajdúnánás SK	30–31	27–28	26–41	36–23		34–22	35–34	30–28	25–25	30–32	31–29	23–35	32–26	28–28
Hódmezővásárhelyi LKC	25–22	25–33	29–32	35–25	26–26		36–31	29–26	23–23	26–35	29–22	23–33	24–22	21–25
Kispest NKK	31–23	15–23	30–29	38–22	37–29	29–20		33–34	25–23	39–35	36–20	24–24	26–31	27–25
Nyíradony VVTK	32–28	19–28	23–32	38–17	30–27	24–14	26–34		26–28	36–28	34–28	22–32	24–23	28–26
Orosházi NKC	30–25	24–40	35–21	42–27	35–32	33–21	18–25	26–30		37–25	35–26	20–19	28–31	34–25
Pénzügyőr SE	25–21	23–39	34–29	39–21	25–26	29–26	36–26	36–29	19–25		44–29	25–36	30–33	28–35
K. Szeged SE	27–27	16–33	22–37	26–24	22–28	28–27	34–28	28–23	28–30	31–37		24–30	22–31	27–32
Szeged KKSE	31–20	32–22	29–25	41–26	38–28	31–22	24–29	27–23	31–31	36–26	38–17		29–24	26–18
Szent István SE	35–23	23–29	35–24	36–24	30–28	26–26	29–28	30–34	24–27	30–28	42–20	27–35		29–27
Szentendrei NKE	25–24	19–20	21–28	47–27	32–26	36–21	21–32	35–31	30–28	34–35	33–22	26–26	26–27	

Legend: Blue = home team win; Yellow = draw; Red = away team win.

== See also ==
- 2017–18 Magyar Kupa
- 2017–18 Nemzeti Bajnokság I
- 2017–18 Nemzeti Bajnokság II
