= Nikola Vukčević =

Nikola Vukčević may refer to:

- Nikola Vukčević (film director) (born 1974), Montenegrin film director
- Nikola Vukčević (historian) (died 1982), Montenegrin historian and ethnologist
- Nikola Vukčević (footballer, born 1984), Montenegrin international footballer
- Nikola Vukčević (footballer, born 1991), Montenegrin international footballer
- Nikola Vukčević (water polo) (born 1985), Montenegrin water polo player

== See also ==
- Nikola Vučević
- Nikolina Vukčević
- Vukčević
