= Julie Foggea =

French handball player (born 1990)

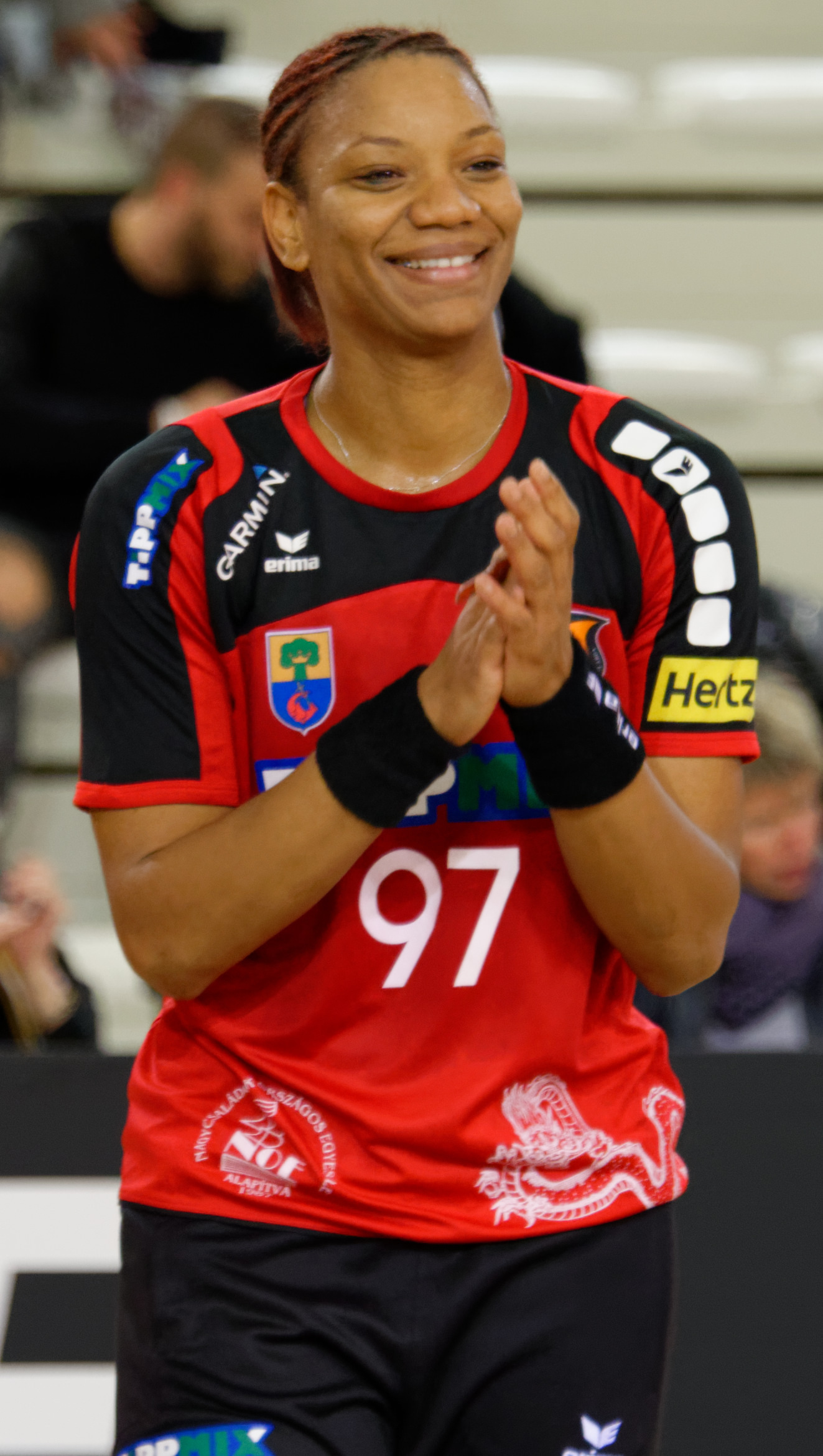
- Foggea in 2017

Personal information
- Nationality: French
- Born: 28 August 1990 (age 36) Les Abymes, Guadeloupe
- Height: 1.81 m (5 ft 11 in)

Sport
- Sport: Handball
- Position: Goalkeeper
- Current club: SCM Râmnicu Vâlcea (handball)
- Number: 97

Senior clubs
- Years: Team
- 2010–2012: Fleury Loiret HB
- 2012–2015: Mios Biganos HB
- 2015–2017: Fleury Loiret HB
- 2017–2020: Érd HC
- 2020–2022: Rapid București
- 2022–2024: Brest Bretagne HB
- 2024-: SCM Râmnicu Vâlcea (handball)
National team
Years	Team	Apps	(Gls)
2016–	France	15	(0)
- Updated on 15 November 2022

Julie Foggea (born 28 August 1990) is a French handballer who plays goalkeeper for french league club Brest Bretagne Handball and the France national team.

== Achievements ==
=== Club ===
- Division 1:
  - Finalist: 2016 (with Fleury Loiret Handball)
- EHF Challenge Cup:
  - Winner: 2015 (with Union Mios Biganos-Bègles)
- Coupe de la Ligue française (French league cup):
  - Winner: 2016 (with Fleury Loiret Handball)
  - Finalist: 2015 (with Union Mios Biganos-Bègles)
- Hungarian league (Nemzeti Bajnokság I):
  - 3rd: 2018 (with Érd HC)
  - 4th: 2019 (with Érd HC)
- Hungarian Cup (Magyar Kupa):
  - Finalist: 2018 (with Érd HC)
  - 3rd: 2019 (with Érd HC)
- Romanian league (Liga Națională):
  - Winner: 2022 (with CS Rapid București)
