= Vukićević =

Vukićević (Serbian Cyrillic: Вукићевић, pronounced [ʋukǐːtɕeʋitɕ]) is a Serbian surname, a patronymic derived from the masculine given name Vukić, itself a diminutive of Vuk (meaning "wolf"). It may refer to:

- Christina Vukicevic (born 1987), Norwegian hurdler of Serbian descent
- Dejan Vukićević (born 1968), former Montenegrin footballer and current manager of Mogren
- Lidija Vukićević (born 1962), Serbian film and TV actress
- Marko Vukićević (born 1992), Serbian alpine skier
- Mirjana Vukićević-Karabin (1933–2020), Serbian astrophysicist
- Petar Vukićević (born 1956), Serbian hurdler
- Stanimir Vukićević (born 1948), Ambassador Extraordinary and Plenipotentiary of the Republic of Serbia to the Republic of Croatia
- Velimir Vukićević (1871–1930), Serbian politician
- Vladimir Vukićević (born 1979), Serbian-American software developer

== See also ==
- Vukičević
- Vukčević
- Vukić
