= Vukcevich =

Vukcevich is a surname, an American form of a surname Serbian: Vukčević. Notable people with the surname include:

- Milan Vukcevich (1937–2003), Serbian-American scientist, chess player, and writer
- Ray Vukcevich (born 1946), American writer

== See also ==
- Vukčević
