= Liliia Gorilska =

Ukrainian handball player

Lilia Gorilska
Personal information
- Full name: Lilia Gorilska
- Nationality: Ukrainian
- Born: 26 February 1988 (age 38) Kryvyi Rih, Ukrainian SSR
- Height: 1.87 m (6 ft 2 in)

Sport
- Sport: Handball
- Position: Pivot
- Current club: Szombathelyi KKA

Senior clubs
- Years: Team
- 2008-2010: HC Smart
- 2010-2011: HC Sparta
- 2011: HC Dunărea Brăila
- 2011-2012: Astrakhanochka Astrakhan
- 2012-2014: RK Zaječar
- 2014-2016: Debrecen handball
- 2016-2018: MTK Budapest
- 2018-2019: OGC Nice Côte d'Azur Handball
- 2019-2022: Szombathelyi KKA
- 2022–2025: Moyra-Budaörs Handball
National team
- Years: Team
- –: Ukraine

Lilia Gorilska (born 26 February 1988, in Kryvyi Rih) is a Ukrainian handballer playing for Moyra-Budaörs and the Ukraine national team.
