= Vukičević =

Vukičević (pronounced [ʋukǐːtʃeʋitɕ]) is a surname found in Croatia, Bosnia and Serbia. It may refer to:

- Ante Vukičević (born 1993), Croatian water polo player
- Branka Vukičević (born 1982), Croatian handball player
- Jelena Pavičić Vukičević (born 1975), Croatian politician
- Lazar Vukičević (1887–1941), Serbian typesetter, publicist and politician
- Perica Vukičević (born 1942), Croatian handball player
- Slaviša Vukičević (born 1962), Bosnian football player

== See also ==
- Vukićević
- Vukčević
