= Érd HC =

Hungarian women's handball club

Érd NK
- Short name: Érd
- Founded: 1977; 49 years ago
- Arena: Érd Aréna, Érd
- Capacity: 2,200
- President: Dr. Anna Boldog
- Head coach: Judit Simics
- League: Nemzeti Bajnokság I
- 2022–23: Nemzeti Bajnokság I, 14th (relegated)
- Club colours
Home	Away

Érd NK is a Hungarian women's handball club from Érd, that play in the Nemzeti Bajnokság II.

The team was promoted to the first division in 2010.

In the 2011–12 season Érd finished fourth in the NBI after losing the third place playoff series 1–2 against Siófok KC. However, it gave them access to their first European Cup, the 2012–13 Women's EHF Cup. One year later the team won its first medal in the elite after a double victory over Váci NKSE in the third place playoff.

The club was relegated in the 2022-23 season after finishing last.

Location of Érd HC

== Crest, colours, supporters ==
=== Kit manufacturers and Shirt sponsor ===
The following table shows in detail Érd HC kit manufacturers and shirt sponsors by year:

Period	Kit manufacturer	Shirt sponsor
	Erima	
2010–2011	Erima	–
2011–2019	Erima	Nagycsaládosok Országos Egyesülete
2019–2020	2Rule	Szerencsejáték Zrt.
2020–	Erima	

== Notable former players ==
- (Hungary) Kinga Janurik
- (Hungary) Tímea Tóth
- (Hungary) Gabriella Tóth
- (Hungary) Melinda Vincze
- (Hungary) Nadine Schatzl
- (Hungary) Anna Kovács
- (Hungary) Krisztina Triscsuk
- (Hungary) Kinga Klivinyi
- (Hungary) Anett Kisfaludy
- (Hungary) Klára Szekeres
- (Hungary) Laura Szabó
- (Hungary) Nikolett Kiss
- (Hungary) Barbara Bognár
- (Hungary) Viktória Oguntoye
- (France) Mariama Signaté
- (France) Coralie Lassource
- (France) Julie Foggea
- (Serbia) Katarina Krpež-Šlezak
- (Serbia) Jovana Kovačević
- (Serbia) Jelena Lavko
- (Serbia) Sandra Kuridza
- (Montenegro) Anđela Bulatović
- (Montenegro) Sara Vukčević
- (Brazil) Alexandra do Nascimento
- (Brazil) Larissa Araújo
- (Sweden) Jamina Roberts
- (Spain) Mireya González
- (Slovenia) Alja Koren
- (Croatia) Kristina Elez
- (Russia) Yulia Khavronina
- (Russia) Ekaterina Kostiukova
- (Czech Republic) Markéta Jeřábková
- (Slovakia) Réka Bízik

== Coaches ==
- (Hungary) Edina Szabó (2010–2020)
- (Hungary) Roland Horváth (2020–2023)
- (Hungary) Judit Simics (2023–2025)

== Honours ==
=== Domestic competitions ===
Nemzeti Bajnokság I (National Championship of Hungary)

- Third place (6): 2012–13, 2013–14, 2014–15, 2015–16, 2016–17, 2017–18

Magyar Kupa (National Cup of Hungary)

- Finalist (2): 2015–16, 2017–18
- Bronze medal (1): 2014–15

Nemzeti Bajnokság I/B:

- Gold: 2010

=== European competitions ===
EHF Cup

- Semifinalists: 2014–15

== Recent seasons ==
As of 23 August 2020.

- Seasons in Nemzeti Bajnokság I: 11
- Seasons in Nemzeti Bajnokság I/B: 2
- Seasons in Nemzeti Bajnokság II: 11

Season	Division	Pos.	Magyar kupa
1993–94			
1994–95			
1995–96	NB II	9th	
1996–97	NB II	9th	
1997–98	NB II	12th	
1998–99	County I		
1999–00	County I	1st	
2000–01	NB II	10th	
2001–02	NB II	10th	
2002–03	NB II	10th	

Season	Division	Pos.	Magyar kupa
2003–04	NB II	11th	
2004–05	NB II	8th	
2005–06	NB II	11th	
2006–07	NB II	10th	
2007–08	NB II	2nd	
2008–09	NB I/B	3rd	
2009–10	NB I/B	1st	
2010–11	NB I	9th	Round 4
2011–12	NB I	4th	Round 4
2012–13	NB I	Third place	Quarter-finals

Season	Division	Pos.	Magyar kupa
2013–14	NB I	Third place	Quarter-finals
2014–15	NB I	Third place	Third place
2015–16	NB I	Third place	Finalist
2016–17	NB I	Third place	Quarter-finals
2017–18	NB I	Third place	Finalist
2018–19	NB I	4th	Third place
2019–20	NB I	Cancelled	Round 4
2020–21	NB I		

=== In European competition ===
- Participations in Champions League: 1x
- Participations in EHF Cup: 6x
- Participations in Cup Winners' Cup: 2x

Season	Competition	Round	Club	Home	Away	Aggregate
2019–20	EHF Cup	Qual. Round 3	(Russia) HC Kuban Krasnodar	39–32	25–30	64–62
2019–20	EHF Cup	Group stage (Group C)	(Poland) MKS Perła Lublin	29–24	29–23	3rd place
2019–20	EHF Cup	Group stage (Group C)	(Romania) CS Gloria 2018 Bistrița-Năsăud	24–24	25–25	3rd place
2019–20	EHF Cup	Group stage (Group C)	(Denmark) Odense Håndbold	27–28	24–31	3rd place
