= 2016–17 Nemzeti Bajnokság I/B (women's handball) =

NB I/B női felnőtt
- Season: 2016–17
- Promoted: HUFBAU-AKKER KNKSE (East); Vasas SC (West)
- Relegated: Ferencvárosi TC II. (East); Dunaújvárosi Kohász KA II. (West)

The 2016–17 Nemzeti Bajnokság I/B is the 49th season of the Nemzeti Bajnokság I/B, Hungary's second tier Handball league.

== Team information ==
Location of teams in 2016-17 Nemzeti Bajnokság I/B (West)
Location of teams in 2016-17 Nemzeti Bajnokság I/B (East)

=== Western Group ===
The following 14 clubs compete in the NB I/B (Western) during the 2016–17 season:

Team	Location	Arena
Csurgói NKC	Csurgó	Sótonyi László Sportcsarnok
Dunaújvárosi Kohász KA II.	Dunaújváros	Városi Sportcsarnok
Győri ETO KC II.	Győr	Audi Aréna
Haladás VSE	Szombathely	Városi Sportcsarnok, Bük
Kozármisleny SE	Kozármisleny	Városi Sportcsarnok
Marcali VSZSE	Marcali	Városi Sportcsarnok
Mohácsi TE	Mohács	Városi Sportcsarnok
NEKA	Balatonboglár	Urányi János Sportcsarnok
Pázmánd NKSE	Gárdony	Ált. Isk. Sportcsarnok
Rinyamenti KC	Nagyatád	Városi Sportcsarnok
Szentendrei NKE	Szentendre	Móricz Zsigmond Gimnázium
Szekszárdi FGKC	Szekszárd	Városi Sportcsarnok
Szombathelyi KKA	Szombathely	Egyetemi Sportcsarnok
Vasas SC	Budapest, XIII. ker	Vasas Sportcsarnok

=== Eastern Group ===
The following 14 clubs compete in the NB I/B (Eastern) during the 2016–17 season:

Team	Location	Arena
NKK Balmazújváros	Balmazújváros	Kőnig Rendezvényközpont
Eszterházy KFSC	Eger	Főiskola Sportcsarnok
FTC II. - NYCS	Budapest, IX. ker	Elek Gyula Aréna
Gödi SE	Göd	Balázsovits János spcs.
Hajdúnánás SK	Hajdúnánás	Somorjai László Sportcsarnok
Hódmezővásárhelyi LKC	Hódmezővásárhely	Balogh Imsi spcs.
K. Szeged SE	Szeged	Városi stadion
Kecskeméti NKSE	Kecskemét	II. Rákóczi Ferenc Ált. Isk.
Nyíradony VVTK	Nyíradony	Városi Sportcsarnok
Orosházi NKC	Orosháza	Eötvös Sportcsarnok
Pénzügyőr SE	Budapest, X. ker	Pénzügyőr Sportcsarnok
Pilisvörösvár KSK	Pilisvörösvár	PEMÜ Sportcsanok
Szeged KKSE	Szeged	Városi Sportcsarnok
Szent István SE	Budapest, IX. ker	Építők Sportcsarnok

== League table ==
=== Western Group ===
	Team	Pld	W	D	L	GF	GA	Diff	Pts	Qualification or relegation	Head-to-head
1	Vasas SC (C, P)	26	23	0	3	750	506	+244	46	Promotion to Nemzeti Bajnokság I	
2	Szombathelyi KKA	26	22	0	4	775	599	+176	44		
3	NEKA	26	16	2	8	710	596	+114	34		
4	Dunaújvárosi Kohász KA II. (R)	26	16	1	9	757	658	+99	33		
5	Mohácsi TE	26	16	0	10	632	593	+32	32		
6	Gárdony-Pázmánd NKSE	26	14	2	10	649	653	−4	30		
7	Győri ETO KC II.	26	13	1	12	697	693	+4	27		
8	Szekszárdi FGKC	26	12	1	13	664	620	+24	25		
9	Rinyamenti KC	26	11	1	14	665	721	−56	23		
10	Szentendrei NKE	26	9	4	13	716	764	−48	22		
11	Kozármisleny SE	26	8	2	16	611	627	−16	18		
12	Marcali VSZSE	26	6	2	18	611	767	−156	14	Relegation to Nemzeti Bajnokság II	MAR - HAL: 25–19; HAL - MAR: 22–27
13	Haladás VSE	26	6	2	18	639	756	−117	14	Relegation to Nemzeti Bajnokság II	MAR - HAL: 25–19; HAL - MAR: 22–27
14	Csurgói NKC	26	1	0	25	587	903	−316	2	Relegation to Nemzeti Bajnokság II	

Pld - Played; W - Won; D - Drawn; L - Lost; GF - Goals for; GA - Goals against; Diff - Difference; Pts - Points.
(C) Champion; (P) Promoted; (R) Relegated.

=== Eastern Group ===
	Team	Pld	W	D	L	GF	GA	Diff	Pts	Qualification or relegation	Head-to-head
1	HUFBAU-AKKER KNKSE (C, P)	26	23	1	2	788	599	+189	47	Promotion to Nemzeti Bajnokság I	
2	PC Trade Szeged KKSE	26	22	0	4	806	550	+256	44		
3	Gödi SE	26	17	0	9	796	739	+57	34		
4	OXXO Energy Orosházi NKC	26	16	1	9	749	688	+61	33		
5	Eszterházy KFSC	26	16	0	10	816	731	+85	32		
6	Szent István SE	26	13	1	12	768	746	+22	27		
7	Pénzügyőr SE	22	13	0	13	703	747	−44	26		
8	Hajdúnánás SK	26	11	2	13	684	759	−75	24		HSK: 6 pts BAL: 4 pts FTC: 2 pts
9	NKK Balmazújváros	26	12	0	14	645	670	25	24		HSK: 6 pts BAL: 4 pts FTC: 2 pts
10	FTC II. - NYCS (R)	26	11	2	13	853	814	39	24		HSK: 6 pts BAL: 4 pts FTC: 2 pts
11	Pilisvörösvár KSK	26	11	1	14	687	740	−53	23		
12	Hódmezővásárhelyi LKC	26	6	2	18	702	813	−111	16	Relegation to Nemzeti Bajnokság II	
13	Nyíradony VVTK	26	4	0	22	609	820	−211	8	Relegation to Nemzeti Bajnokság II	
14	K. Szeged SE	26	2	0	24	624	814	−190	3	Relegation to Nemzeti Bajnokság II	

Pld - Played; W - Won; D - Drawn; L - Lost; GF - Goals for; GA - Goals against; Diff - Difference; Pts - Points.
(C) Champion; (P) Promoted; (R) Relegated.

== See also ==
- 2016–17 Magyar Kupa
- 2016–17 Nemzeti Bajnokság I
- 2016–17 Nemzeti Bajnokság II
