= Sara Vukčević =

Montenegrin handball player (born 1992)

Personal information
- Nationality: Montenegrin
- Born: 25 March 1992 (age 34) Podgorica, SR Montenegro, SFR Yugoslavia
- Height: 1.83 m (6 ft 0 in)

Sport
- Sport: Handball
- Position: Pivot
- Current club: Csurgói NKC
- Number: 3

Senior clubs
- Years: Team
- 2010–2017: ŽRK Budućnost Podgorica
- 2011–2015: → Érdi VSE
- 2015–2017: → Váci NKSE
- 2017–2018: HCM Râmnicu Vâlcea
- 2018–2019: Mosonmagyaróvári KC SE
- 2019–: Csurgói NKC
National team
- Years: Team
- –: Montenegro
Medal record
European Championship
| Gold medal – first place | 2012 Serbia | Team |

Sara Vukčević (born 25 March 1992) is a Montegerin handballer who plays for Csurgói NKC. Vukčević is also a member of the Montenegrin national team, with whom she won the gold medal at the 2012 European Championships in Serbia.

== International honours ==
- Montenegrin Championship:
  - Winner: 2010, 2011, 2012, 2013, 2014, 2015
- Montenegrin Cup:
  - Winner: 2010, 2011, 2012, 2013, 2014, 2015
- EHF Champions League:
  - Semifinalist: 2011
- EHF Cup:
  - Semifinalist: 2015
- European Championship:
  - Winner: 2012
