= Barbara Pálos-Bognár =

Hungarian handball player (born 1987)

Personal information
- Full name: Barbara Alexandra; Pálos-Bognár
- Nationality: Hungarian
- Born: 7 November 1987 (age 38) Győr, Hungary
- Height: 1.76 m (5 ft 9 in)

Sport
- Sport: Handball
- Position: Centre back
- Current club: Budaörs Handball
- Number: 30

Senior clubs
- Years: Team
- –2007: Győri ETO KC
- 2007–2008: Aalborg DH
- 2008–2011: Debreceni VSC
- 2011–2015: Érd NK
- 2015–2016: Viborg HK
- 2016–2024: Moyra-Budaörs Handball
National team
Years	Team	Apps	(Gls)
2009–	Hungary	20	(9)
- Updated on 13 December 2018

Barbara Pálos-Bognár (née Bognár) (born 7 November 1987) is a Hungarian handballer for Moyra-Budaörs Handball as a playmaker.

== Achievements ==
- Nemzeti Bajnokság I:
  - Winner: 2005, 2006
  - Silver Medallist: 2004, 2007, 2010, 2011
  - Bronze Medallist: 2009
- Magyar Kupa:
  - Winner: 2005, 2006, 2007
  - Silver Medallist: 2004, 2009, 2011
- EHF Champions League:
  - Semifinalist: 2007
- EHF Cup:
  - Finalist: 2004, 2005
- EHF Cup Winners' Cup:
  - Finalist: 2006
