= Branka Vukičević =

Croatian basketball player

Personal information
- Born: 21 February 1982 (age 44) Šibenik, SFR Yugoslavia
- Listed height: 1.73 m (5 ft 8 in)
- Position: Point guard / shooting guard

Career history
- ?: Vidici Dalmostan
- ?: Gospić
- ?: Kranjska Gora Jesenice
- ?: Rockwool Pula
- 20??-2011: Novi Zagreb
- 2011-2013: Agram Zagreb

Branka Vukičević (born 21 February 1982) is a Croatian female professional basketball player.
