= Ildikó Erdősi =

Hungarian handball player (born 1989)

Personal information
- Nationality: Hungarian
- Born: 14 September 1989 (age 37) Dunaújváros, Hungary
- Height: 1.71 m (5 ft 7 in)

Sport
- Sport: Handball
- Position: Left wing
- Current club: Retired
National team
Years	Team	Apps	(Gls)
2014–2017	Hungary	38	(77)

Ildikó Erdősi (born 14 September 1989) is a retired Hungarian handball player. She currently works as a physiotherapist at Dunaújvárosi Kohász KA.
