= Yulia Khavronina =

Russian handball player

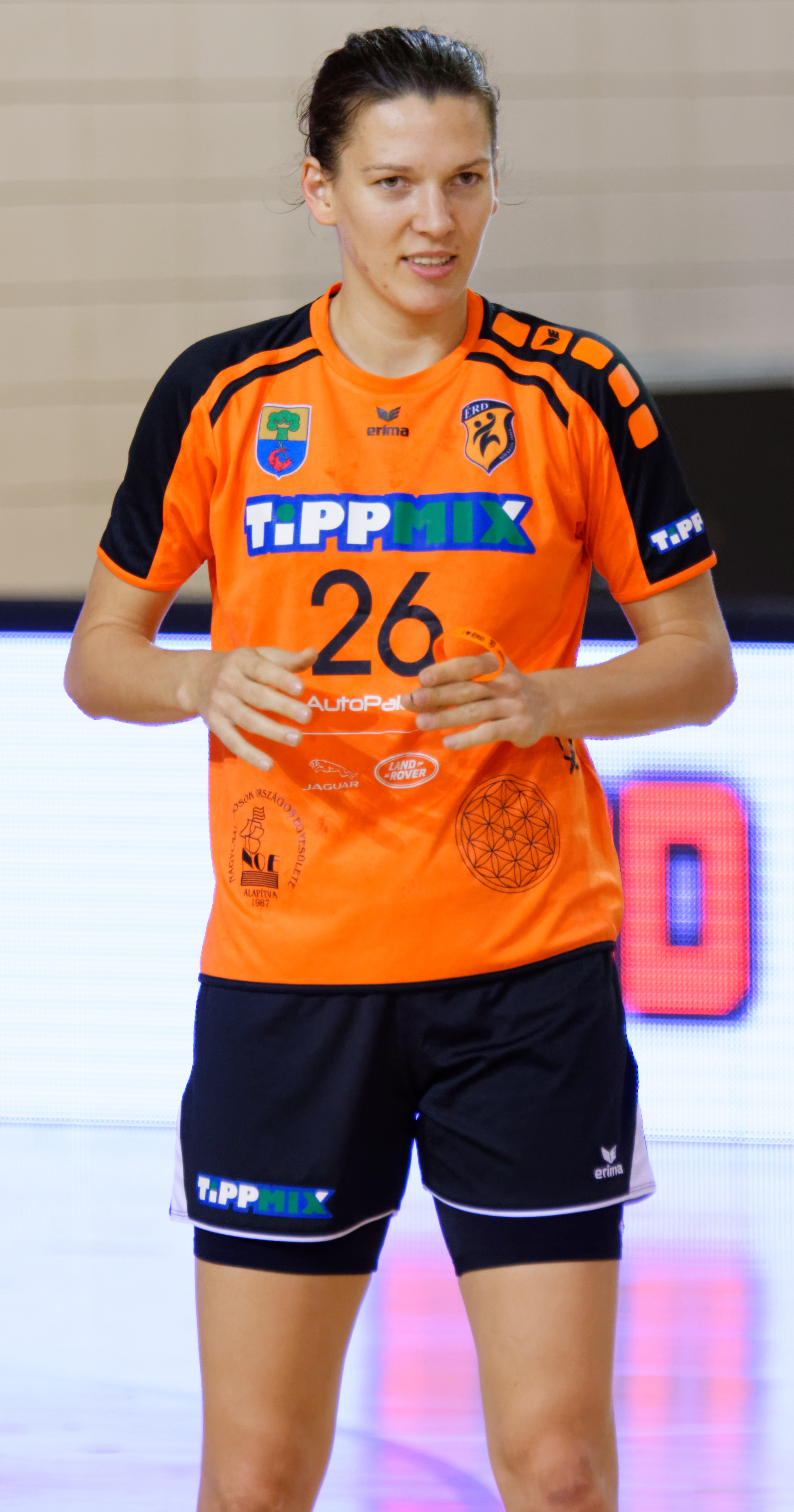

Personal information
- Full name: Yulia Khavronina
- Nationality: Russian
- Born: 20 May 1992 (age 34) Astrakhan, Russia
- Height: 1.86 m (6 ft 1 in)

Sport
- Sport: Handball
- Position: Right Back
- Current club: HC Chernomorochk
- Number: 29

Senior clubs
- Years: Team
- –2015: Zvezda Zvenigorod
- 2015–2017: Érd HC
- 2017–2018: Toulon Saint-Cyr
- 2018– oct 2018: CSM Roman
- 2018–2019: Gloria Buzău
- 2019–2020: SCM Craiova
- 2020–2021: Kastamonu Bld. GSK
- 2021–2022: PDO Handball Team Salerno
- 2022–2023: Maccabi Arazim Ramat Gan
- 2023–: HC Chernomorochka

Yulia Khavronina (born 20 May 1992) is a Russian handballer who plays for Israel handball team Maccabi Arazim Ramat Gan.

== International honours ==
- EHF Cup Winners' Cup:
  - Finalist: 2014
