= Vukić =

Vukić (Serbo-Croatian pronunciation: [ʋǔːkitɕ]) is a Serbo-Croatian surname, a patronymic derived from given name Vuk. It is itself a diminutive, meaning "little Vuk". It may refer to:

- Adela Ber Vukić (1888–1966), Yugoslav painter
- Aleksandar Vukic (born 1996), Australian tennis player
- Darko Vukić (born 1968), Croatian football player
- Elena Vukić (born 1991), Croatian volleyball player
- Igor Vukić (born 1966), Croatian journalist and historical negationist
- Ivan Lupis Vukić (1813–1875), Austro-Hungarian Navy officer and inventor
- Ljubo Vukić (born 1982), Croatian handball player
- Milan Vukić (born 1942), Bosnian chess Grandmaster
- Stefan Vukić (born 1995), Serbian football player
- Zvonimir Vukić (born 1979), Serbian footballer
