= Uroš Bregar =

Slovenian handball coach (born 1979)

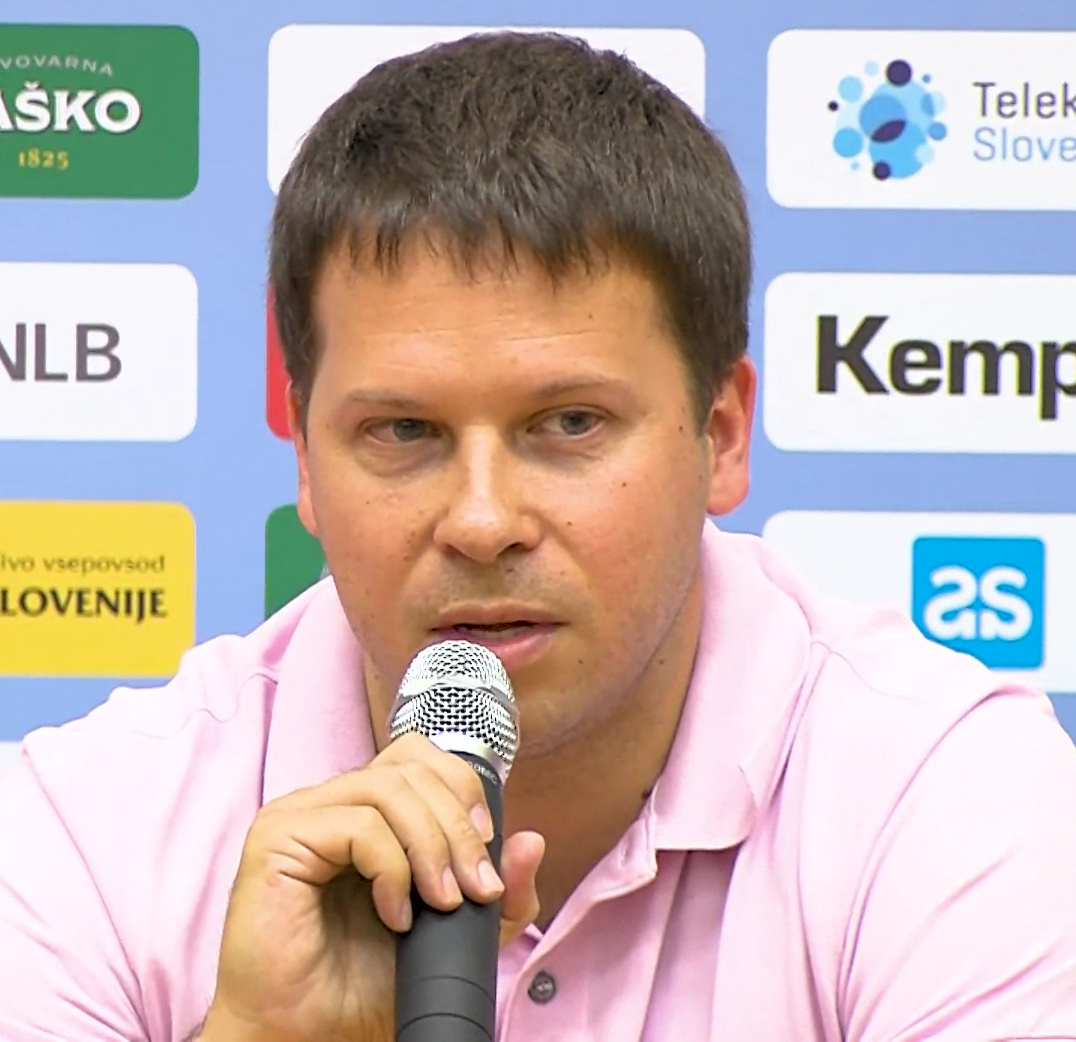

Personal information
- Nationality: Slovenian
- Born: 22 February 1979 (age 47)

Sport
- Sport: Handball
- Current club: Győri ETO KC (assistant)

Teams managed
- Years: Team
- 2015–2021: Slovenia women's team
- 2016–2021: RK Krim
- 2021–2024: Serbia women's team
- 2021–2023: Siófok KC
- 2023–2024: ŽRK Vojvodina
- 2024–: Győri ETO KC (assistant)

Uroš Bregar (born 22 February 1979) is a Slovenian handball coach who is the assistant coach of Győri ETO KC.
