= Katarina Krpež Šlezak =

Serbian handball player (born 1988)

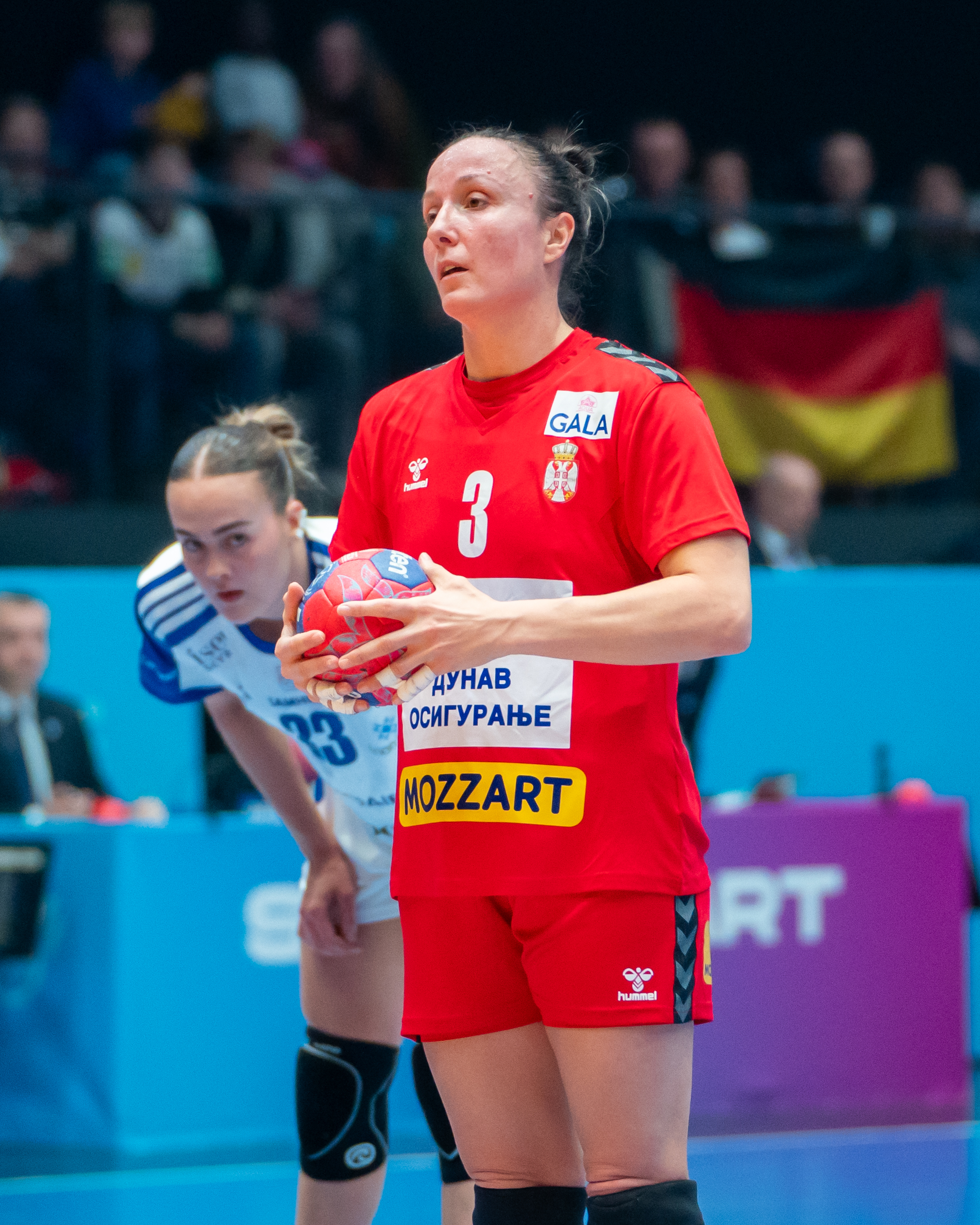
- Krpež Šlezak in 2025

Personal information
- Nationality: Serbian; Hungarian
- Born: 2 May 1988 (age 38) Sombor, SR Serbia, SFR Yugoslavia
- Height: 1.68 m (5 ft 6 in)

Sport
- Sport: Handball
- Position: Right wing
- Current club: CSM Corona Brașov
- Number: 33

Senior clubs
- Years: Team
- –2009: ORK Vrnjačka Banja
- 2009–2010: ŽRK Kikinda
- 2010–2011: RK Zaječar
- 2011–2012: ŽRK Metalurg
- 2012–2014: RK Krim Ljubljana
- 2014–2020: Érd NK
- 2020–2021: Rostov-Don
- 2021–2022: RK Krim Ljubljana
- 2022–2024: SCM Craiova
- 2024–2026: CSM Corona Brașov
- 2026–: Moyra-Budaörs Handball
National team
Years	Team	Apps	(Gls)
2008–2026	Serbia	164	(413)
Medal record
World Championship
Silver medal – second place	2013 Serbia
Mediterranean Games
Gold medal – first place	2013 Mersin	Team

Katarina Krpež Šlezak (Serbian Cyrillic: Катарина Крпеж Шлезак, born 2 May 1988) is a Serbian handball player for CSM Corona Brașov.

== Individual awards ==
- Nemzeti Bajnokság I Topscorer: 2016, 2018, 2019
- Top Scorer of the European Championship: 2018

== Personal life ==
She also holds a Hungarian passport obtained in 2017 through paternal ancestry.
