= Nikolina Vukčević =

Montenegrin handball player (born 2000)

Personal information
- Nationality: Montenegrin
- Born: 28 July 2000 (age 26) Podgorica, Montenegro, FR Yugoslavia
- Height: 1.79 m (5 ft 10 in)

Sport
- Sport: Handball
- Position: Pivot
- Current club: ŽRK Budućnost Podgorica
- Number: 97

Senior clubs
- Years: Team
- 2017–2024: ŽRK Budućnost Podgorica
National team
| Years | Team | Apps | (Gls) |
| 2019– | Montenegro | 38 | (14) |
Medal record
Mediterranean Games
| Silver medal – second place | 2018 Tarragona | Team |

Nikolina Vukčević (born 28 July 2000) is a Montenegrin handball player for ŽRK Budućnost Podgorica and the Montenegrin national team.

She represented Montenegro at the 2020 European Women's Handball Championship.

== Achievements ==
- Montenegrin Championship:
  - Winner: 2018, 2019, 2021
- Montenegrin Cup:
  - Winner: 2018, 2019, 2020, 2021
- Women's Regional Handball League:
  - Winner: 2019
