= VKLSE Győr =

- Full name: Volt Kinizsis Lányok Sportklubja Egyesület
- Short name: VKLSE
- Founded: 2000
- Arena: Magvassy Mihály Sportcsarnok, Győr
- Capacity: 2,800 seats
- President: Tibor Csomor
- Head coach: Tibor Csomor
- League: Nemzeti Bajnokság I/B
- 2009–10: Nemzeti Bajnokság I/B – Western Group, 9th
- Club colours
Home	Away

Volt Kinizsis Lányok Sportklubja Egyesület is a Hungarian women's handball club from Győr. They currently compete in the Nemzeti Bajnokság I/B, the second tier championship in Hungary.

== History ==
The club was founded in 2000 by the former Győri Keksz ETO players, who have played on hobby level after their retirement from professional handball. In 2001 they entered the county level championship, which is the fourth tier of Hungarian handball leagues. They dominated through the whole season and gained immediate promotion to Nemzeti Bajnokság II. After finishing constantly between 3rd and 5th places in the next half decade the breakthrough came in the 2007/08 edition of NB II. By winning 18 league matches beside only one loss and one draw, the Győr-based team found themselves on the top spot at the end of the season and celebrated a further promotion.

Getting ready for a higher level went slowly for VKLSE. Their inaugural season in Nemzeti Bajnokság I/B ended tristful: with only three wins the team finished second from bottom and escaped from relegation only because the league have been expanded from 11 to 14 teams that year. For the 2009–10 season VKLSE strengthened the squad with experienced players, which resulted some improvement and they captured the 9th position.

== Results ==
- Nemzeti Bajnokság II
  - Gold: 2008

== Current squad ==
As of 22 February 2011

Goalkeepers

- (Hungary) Alexandra Gáborfalvi
- (Hungary) Beatrix Jagadics
- (Hungary) Klaudia Wunderli

Wingers

- (Hungary) Klaudia Csiszár
- (Hungary) Kitti Fekete
- (Hungary) Krisztina Raucsik
- (Hungary) Alexandra Sarmon

Line Players

- (Hungary) Ágnes Fábián
- (Hungary) Fanni Székesi

Back Players

- (Hungary) Lukrécia Burghardt
- (Hungary) Dóra Horváth
- (Hungary) Lilla Imrefalvi
- (Hungary) Dóra Karácsony
- (Hungary) Tímea Kovács
- (Hungary) Barbara Schmied
- (Hungary) Ingrid Vida
