= Tone Tiselj =

Slovenian handball player and coach

Personal information
- Nationality: Slovenian
- Born: 21 September 1961 (age 65)
- Height: 1.70 m (5 ft 7 in)

Sport
- Sport: Handball

Senior clubs
- Years: Team
- –: Aero Celje

Teams managed
- 1992–1994: Slovenia (men)
- 1999–2000: Trieste
- 2000–2006: RK Krim
- 2003–2004: Slovenia (men)
- 2006–2007: KIF Vejen
- 2007–2008: ŽRK Budućnost Podgorica
- 2007–2008: Montenegro (women)
- 2008–2010: RK Celje
- 2010–2011: RK Gorenje Velenje
- 2011–2014: RK Krim
- 2014–2015: Baia Mare
- 2015–2018: Debreceni VSC

Tone Tiselj (born 21 September 1961) is a Slovenian handball coach and former handball player.

Tiselj led Slovenia Men, Slovenia Women, Montenegro Women, Celje Pivovarna Laško, RK Gorenje Velenje, KIF Vejen, Budućnost, Krim Ljubljana, HCM Baia Mare or DVSC most recently.

== International coaching achievements ==
=== Club ===
- EHF Champions League – women:
  - Winner: 2001, 2003
- EHF Champions Trophy – women:
  - Winner: 2003

=== National team ===
- European Championship – men's tournament:
  - Silver Medalist: 2004
- Summer Olympics – men's tournament:
  - Eleventh: 2004

== Personal life ==
He is married to Damjana, with whom he has two children. Tone Tiselj is a professor of physical education. He loves Italian.
