= Moyra-Budaörs Handball =

Hungarian women's handball club

- Full name: Budaörs Handball
- Short name: Budaörs
- Founded: 2011
- Arena: Budaörs Városi Uszoda Sportcsarnok és Strand, Budaörs
- Head coach: Dániel Buday
- League: Nemzeti Bajnokság I
- 2021–22: Nemzeti Bajnokság I, 11th
- Club colours

Budaörs Handball is a Hungarian women's handball club, that plays in the Nemzeti Bajnokság I, the top level championship in Hungary. They played in the first division between 2015 and 2019, then they spent two seasons in the second division (Nemzeti Bajnokság I/B) before qualifying for the first league again in 2021.

== Kits ==
HOME
2018–19	2019–20

AWAY
2018–19	2019–20

THIRD

2018–19

== Team ==
=== Current squad ===
Squad for the 2026–27 season

Goalkeepers

- 88 (Hungary) Dalma Mátéfi
- 72 (Hungary) Panna Zsigmond
- 96 (Hungary) Boglárka Tóth

Wingers
LW

- 6 (Hungary) Nadine Szöllősi-Schatzl
- 11 (Hungary) Nikolett Sallai
- 32 (Hungary) Petra Tamás

RW

- 10 (Hungary) Kyra Sztankovics
- 3 (Serbia) (Hungary) Katarina Krpež Šlezak

Line players

- 8 (Hungary) Fruzsina Bardi
- 94 (Hungary) Jázmin Kovalcsik

Back players
Left backs

- 33 (Hungary) (Slovakia) Anette Emma Hudák
- 13 (Hungary) Lili Uhrin
- 50 (Hungary) Luca Kármán
- 98 (Hungary) Euniké Sára Egejuru

Playmakers

- 24 (Hungary) Nikolett Marincsák
- 15 (Hungary) Kinga Debreczeni-Klivinyi

Right backs

- 9 (Hungary) Luca Szekerczés
- 27 (Hungary) Dorka Kiss

=== Staff members ===
- Head coach: (Hungary) Dániel Buday
- Assistant coach: (Hungary) Zoltán Pinizsi
- Goalkeeper coach: (Hungary) Irina Sirina
- Professional director: (Hungary) Ágnes Hornyák

=== Transfers ===
Transfers for the 2026–27 season

Joining

- (Hungary) Nikolett Sallai (LW) from (Hungary) Szombathelyi KKA
- (Hungary) Euniké Sára Egejuru (LB) from (Hungary) Dunaújvárosi Kohász KA
- (Serbia) (Hungary) Katarina Krpež Šlezak from (Romania) CSM Corona Brașov

Leaving

- (Hungary) Éva Schneider (RB) to (Hungary) Vasas SC
- (Hungary) Fanni Bede (LW) to (Hungary) Vasas SC
- (Hungary) Tamara Vártok (RW) to (Hungary) Esztergomi KC

== Honours ==
=== Domestic competitions ===
- Magyar Kupa:
- Bronze: 2025

Nemzeti Bajnokság I/B:

- Gold: 2013, 2015, 2021

== Notable former players ==
- (Hungary) Ágnes Hornyák
- (Hungary) Szandra Szöllősi-Zácsik
- (Hungary) Barbara Pálos-Bognár
- (Hungary) Nadine Schatzl
- (Hungary) Fruzsina Dávid-Azari
- (Hungary) Noémi Pásztor
- (Hungary) Viktória Soós
- (Hungary) Bernadett Bódi
- (Serbia) Jelena Agbaba
- (Ukraine) Lilia Gorilska

== Head coach history ==
(Hungary)	Attila Mihály	2015–2018
(Hungary)	Tamás Neukum	2018–2019
(Hungary)	Péter Fülöp	2019–2020
(Hungary)	Dániel Buday	2020–present
