= 2014 European Women's Handball Championship squads =

The following is a list of squads for each nation competing at the 2014 European Women's Handball Championship.

On 7 November 2014 every coach had to submit a list of a maximum of 28 players, whom which 16 were selected for the final tournament.

The final squads were revealed on 6 and 7 December 2014 at the technical meetings.

== Group A ==
=== Hungary ===
Head coach: András Németh

A 16-player squad was announced on 24 November 2014.

No.	Pos.	Name	Date of birth (age)	Height	App.	Goals	Club
5	LB	Krisztina Triscsuk	17 July 1985 (aged 29)	1.76 m	19	25	(Hungary) Dunaújvárosi Kohász KA
7	CB	Zita Szucsánszki	22 May 1987 (aged 27)	1.72 m	105	321	(Hungary) Ferencváros
8	LW	Anikó Kovacsics	29 August 1991 (aged 23)	1.70 m	60	97	(Hungary) Győri ETO
10	LB	Anita Bulath	20 September 1983 (aged 31)	1.77 m	85	195	(Hungary) Dunaújvárosi Kohász KA
12	GK	Orsolya Herr	23 November 1984 (aged 30)	1.76 m	142	0	(Hungary) Győri ETO
15	LB	Kinga Klivinyi	31 March 1992 (aged 22)	1.78 m	24	44	(Hungary) Érd
16	GK	Blanka Bíró	22 September 1994 (aged 20)	1.85 m	6	1	(Hungary) Vác
18	P	Piroska Szamoránsky	9 July 1986 (aged 28)	1.71 m	122	254	(Hungary) Ferencváros
21	GK	Éva Kiss	10 July 1987 (aged 27)	1.89 m	43	0	(Hungary) Fehérvár KC
22	RW	Bernadett Bódi	9 March 1986 (aged 28)	1.75 m	99	173	(Hungary) Győri ETO
24	P	Szabina Mayer	24 March 1988 (aged 26)	1.70 m	15	12	(Hungary) Fehérvár KC
30	RB	Szimonetta Planéta	12 December 1993 (aged 20)	1.98 m	16	15	(Hungary) Győri ETO
34	P	Rea Mészáros	14 April 1994 (aged 20)	1.72 m	5	1	(Hungary) Ferencváros
44	LW	Ildikó Erdősi	14 September 1989 (aged 25)	1.71 m	5	11	(Hungary) Siófok
83	RW	Mónika Kovacsicz	20 November 1983 (aged 31)	1.71 m	133	309	(Hungary) Ferencváros
86	CB	Bernadett Temes	15 May 1986 (aged 28)	1.77 m	24	20	(Germany) TuS Metzingen
87	RB	Zsuzsanna Tomori	18 June 1987 (aged 27)	1.86 m	126	342	(Hungary) Ferencváros
96	CB	Gabriella Tóth	23 September 1996 (aged 18)	1.75 m	4	7	(Hungary) Mosonmagyaróvár

=== Poland ===
Head coach: (Denmark) Kim Rasmussen

The squad was announced on 4 December 2014.

No.	Pos.	Name	Date of birth (age)	Height	App.	Goals	Club
1	GK	Małgorzata Gapska	3 September 1983 (aged 31)	1.76 m	81	1	(Poland) Vistal Gdynia
4	P	Monika Stachowska	2 January 1981 (aged 33)	1.79 m	91	125	(Poland) Pogoń Szczecin
5	LB/RB	Iwona Niedźwiedź	22 July 1979 (aged 35)	1.77 m	165	470	(Poland) Vistal Gdynia
6	CB	Karolina Siódmiak	14 September 1981 (aged 33)	1.78 m	68	171	(Poland) AZS OŚ Gdańsk
8	LB	Marta Gega	16 April 1986 (aged 28)	1.84 m	24	29	(Poland) SPR Lublin
9	LW	Agnieszka Kocela	17 January 1988 (aged 26)	1.70 m	24	44	(Poland) SPR Lublin
11	LW	Kinga Grzyb	12 January 1982 (aged 32)	1.68 m	196	487	(Poland) Start Elbląg
14	LB	Karolina Kudłacz	17 January 1985 (aged 29)	1.77 m	128	660	(Germany) HC Leipzig
15	RW	Katarzyna Janiszewska	26 October 1995 (aged 19)	1.68 m	7	10	(Poland) Vistal Gdynia
17	LB	Klaudia Pielesz	25 October 1988 (aged 26)	1.90 m	66	146	(Germany) SG BBM Bietigheim
18	RB	Aleksandra Zych	28 July 1992 (aged 22)	1.86 m	8	14	(Poland) Vistal Gdynia
20	P	Joanna Drabik	28 October 1993 (aged 21)	1.80 m	9	5	(Poland) SPR Lublin
25	RW	Karolina Zalewska	19 March 1984 (aged 30)	1.72 m	25	30	(France) Issy Paris
28	LB	Alina Wojtas	21 March 1987 (aged 27)	1.91 m	62	185	(Norway) Larvik HK
40	GK	Anna Wysokińska	17 June 1987 (aged 27)	1.82 m	36	0	(Germany) SG BBM Bietigheim
64	GK	Izabela Prudzienica	27 May 1985 (aged 29)	1.79 m	27	0	(Poland) AZS Koszalin
77	P	Patrycja Kulwińska	31 March 1989 (aged 25)	1.78 m	78	124	(Poland) Vistal Gdynia
89	CB	Kinga Byzdra	9 January 1989 (aged 25)	1.81 m	111	262	(Montenegro) Budućnost

=== Russia ===
Head coach: Yevgeni Trefilov

The squad was announced on 27 November 2014 with changes made on 4 December 2014.

No.	Pos.	Name	Date of birth (age)	Height	App.	Goals	Club
1	GK	Anna Sedoykina	1 August 1984 (aged 30)	1.81 m	86	0	(Russia) Dinamo Volgograd
2	LW	Polina Kuznetcova	10 June 1987 (aged 27)	1.70 m	89	240	(Russia) Astrakhanochka
8	LB	Anna Sen	3 December 1990 (aged 24)	1.85 m	51	119	(Hungary) Győri ETO
15	RW	Yana Uskova	28 September 1985 (aged 29)	1.74 m	96	142	(Russia) Zvezda Zvenigorod
16	GK	Maria Sidorova	21 November 1979 (aged 35)	1.78 m	182	5	(Russia) Zvezda Zvenigorod
17	LB	Vladlena Bobrovnikova	24 October 1987 (aged 27)	1.80 m	4	7	(Russia) Rostov-Don
18	RB	Ekaterina Davydenko	7 March 1989 (aged 25)	1.84 m	75	207	(Romania) HCM Baia Mare
19	P	Ksenia Makeeva	19 September 1990 (aged 24)	1.85 m	45	84	(Romania) HCM Baia Mare
21	LB	Victoria Zhilinskayte	6 March 1989 (aged 25)	1.88 m	88	139	(Russia) HC Astrakhanochka
22	LW	Yekaterina Marennikova	29 April 1982 (aged 32)	1.79 m	87	218	(Russia) Zvezda Zvenigorod
23	RB	Anna Punko	27 February 1989 (aged 25)	1.83 m	6	8	(Russia) Rostov-Don
24	RB	Irina Bliznova	6 October 1986 (aged 28)	1.82 m	106	289	(Russia) Lada Togliatti
25	RW	Olga Chernoivanenko	17 April 1989 (aged 25)	1.75 m	73	158	(North Macedonia) Vardar
27	CB	Daria Dmitrieva	9 August 1995 (aged 19)	1.78 m	0	0	(Russia) Dinamo Volgograd
33	CB	Ekaterina Ilyina	7 March 1991 (aged 23)	1.75 m	24	39	(Russia) Rostov-Don
75	P	Maya Petrova	26 May 1982 (aged 32)	1.84 m	58	92	(Russia) Rostov-Don

=== Spain ===
Head coach: Jorge Dueñas

An 18-player squad was announced on 5 November 2014. The final squad was announced on 5 December 2014.

No.	Pos.	Name	Date of birth (age)	Height	App.	Goals	Club
2	RW	Marta López	4 February 1990 (aged 22)	1.68 m	51	118	(France) Fleury Loiret
4	RW	Carmen Martín	29 May 1988 (aged 24)	1.69 m	138	432	(Romania) CSM București
5	P	Maria Núñez	27 November 1988 (aged 24)	1.72 m	11	8	(Spain) Bera Bera
7	LB	Beatriz Fernández	19 March 1985 (aged 27)	1.80 m	163	358	(France) Fleury Loiret
9	RB	Marta Mangué	23 April 1983 (aged 29)	1.70 m	251	909	(France) Fleury Loiret
10	CB	Macarena Aguilar	12 March 1985 (aged 27)	1.70 m	184	540	(Hungary) Győri ETO
12	GK	Silvia Navarro	20 March 1979 (aged 33)	1.69 m	108	2	(Spain) Remudas
14	P	Elisabeth Chávez	17 November 1990 (aged 22)	1.92 m	122	57	(France) Nice
17	LW	Elisabeth Pinedo	13 May 1981 (aged 31)	1.75 m	158	349	(Spain) Bera Bera
22	CB	Beatriz Escribano	4 May 1990 (aged 22)	1.77 m	24	13	(France) Nice
25	LB	Nerea Pena	13 December 1989 (aged 22)	1.75 m	65	170	(Hungary) Ferencváros
27	LB	Lara González Ortega	22 February 1992 (aged 20)	1.84 m	23	28	(France) Metz
30	LB	Patricia Elorza	8 April 1984 (aged 28)	1.80 m	86	55	(Spain) Bera Bera
35	LW	Naiara Egozkue	21 October 1983 (aged 29)	1.73 m	29	47	(Spain) Atlético Guardés
84	GK	Ana Temprano	28 January 1984 (aged 28)	1.72 m	2	0	(Spain) Bera Bera
86	LB	Alexandrina Barbosa	5 May 1986 (aged 26)	1.75 m	32	175	(France) Fleury Loiret

== Group B ==
=== Denmark ===
Head coach: Jan Pytlick

A 15-player squad was announced on 27 October 2014. The final squad was revealed on 29 November 2014 and announced on 3 December 2014. Squad was approved on 7 December 2014

No.	Pos.	Name	Date of birth (age)	Height	App.	Goals	Club
1	GK	Sandra Toft	21 June 1989 (aged 25)	1.76 m	42	0	(Norway) Larvik HK
3	RW	Maibritt Kviesgaard	15 May 1986 (aged 28)	1.72 m	102	214	(Denmark) Team Esbjerg
4	P	Susan Thorsgaard	13 October 1988 (aged 26)	1.89 m	119	201	(Denmark) Midtjylland
7	LW	Maria Fisker	3 October 1990 (aged 24)	1.70 m	49	133	(Denmark) Viborg HK
8	LB	Anne Mette Hansen	25 August 1994 (aged 20)	1.77 m	17	27	(Denmark) København
11	P	Mette Gravholt	12 December 1984 (aged 29)	1.72 m	40	100	(Denmark) Viborg HK
14	CB	Lotte Grigel	5 April 1991 (aged 23)	1.65 m	41	94	(Denmark) Team Esbjerg
15	LB	Pernille Holst Holmsgaard	6 September 1984 (aged 30)	1.84 m	110	115	(Denmark) København
18	RB	Mette Tranborg	1 January 1996 (aged 18)	1.87 m	4	6	(Denmark) Århus
19	RB	Line Jørgensen	31 December 1989 (aged 24)	1.86 m	107	270	(Denmark) Midtjylland
20	GK	Rikke Poulsen	20 April 1986 (aged 28)	1.77 m	42	0	(Denmark) Viborg HK
21	CB	Kristina Kristiansen	13 July 1989 (aged 25)	1.63 m	99	270	(Denmark) Team Tvis Holstebro
23	LW	Ann Grete Nørgaard	15 September 1983 (aged 31)	1.62 m	109	459	(Denmark) Team Tvis Holstebro
24	CB	Lærke Møller	14 January 1989 (aged 25)	1.71 m	47	135	(Denmark) Team Tvis Holstebro
25	RW	Trine Østergaard Jensen	17 October 1991 (aged 23)	1.65 m	35	51	(Denmark) Midtjylland
26	P	Louise Spellerberg	1 October 1982 (aged 32)	1.78 m	45	58	(Denmark) København
27	RB	Louise Burgaard	17 October 1992 (aged 22)	1.78 m	60	156	(Denmark) Viborg HK
28	LB	Stine Jørgensen	3 September 1990 (aged 24)	1.80 m	64	138	(Denmark) Midtjylland

=== Norway ===
Head coach: Thorir Hergeirsson

A 12-player preliminary squad was announced on 11 November 2014. The final roster was announced on 21 November 2014. Ida Bjørndalen replaced Linn Jørum Sulland due to an injury on 30 November 2014. Emily Stang Sando replaced Kari Aalvik Grimsbø due to an injury on 8 December 2014.

No.	Pos.	Name	Date of birth (age)	Height	App.	Goals	Club
1	GK	Kari Aalvik Grimsbø	4 January 1985 (aged 29)	1.80 m	113	0	(Denmark) Team Esbjerg
2	LB	Betina Riegelhuth	17 June 1987 (aged 27)	1.78 m	21	19	(Norway) Storhamar HE
3	LB	Emilie Hegh Arntzen	1 January 1994 (aged 20)	1.83 m	8	8	(Norway) Byåsen HE
4	LB	Veronica Kristiansen	10 July 1990 (aged 24)	1.75 m	34	81	(Norway) Glassverket IF
5	LB	Ida Alstad	13 June 1985 (aged 29)	1.72 m	116	283	(Denmark) Midtjylland
6	P	Heidi Løke	12 December 1982 (aged 31)	1.73 m	137	484	(Hungary) Győri ETO
8	CB	Karoline Dyhre Breivang	10 May 1980 (aged 34)	1.72 m	297	471	(Norway) Larvik HK
9	RB	Nora Mørk	5 April 1991 (aged 23)	1.69 m	39	146	(Norway) Larvik HK
10	CB	Stine Bredal Oftedal	25 September 1991 (aged 23)	1.68 m	85	132	(France) Issy Paris
12	GK	Silje Solberg	16 June 1990 (aged 24)	1.78 m	58	0	(Denmark) Team Tvis Holstebro
14	RB	Ida Bjørndalen Karlsson	6 May 1983 (aged 31)	1.78 m	27	35	(Denmark) Team Esbjerg
16	GK	Emily Stang Sando	8 March 1989 (age 37)	1.80 m	9	1	(Denmark) Team Esbjerg
18	RW	Linn-Kristin Riegelhuth Koren	1 August 1984 (aged 30)	1.75 m	257	919	(Norway) Larvik HK
20	RB	Maja Jakobsen	28 March 1990 (aged 24)	1.70 m	26	25	(Norway) Storhamar HE
23	LW	Camilla Herrem	8 October 1986 (aged 28)	1.69 m	147	357	(Romania) HCM Baia Mare
24	LW	Sanna Solberg	16 June 1990 (aged 24)	1.78 m	41	84	(Norway) Larvik HK
26	P	Pernille Wibe	17 April 1988 (aged 26)	1.81 m	24	12	(France) Issy Paris

=== Romania ===
Head coach: Gheorghe Tadici

A 17-player squad was announced on 11 November 2014, which was made 18 on 25 November 2014. Changes were made on 5 December 2014. On 11 December 2014 Adriana Nechita was replaced by Aneta Pîrvuț.

No.	Pos.	Name	Date of birth (age)	Height	App.	Goals	Club
2	RW	Aneta Pîrvuț	22 June 1989 (age 37)	1.66 m	12	15	(Romania) S.C.M. Craiova
4	LB/RB	Oana Bondar	26 March 1983 (aged 31)	1.78 m	0	0	(Romania) Corona Brașov
6	P	Crina Pintea	3 April 1990 (aged 24)	1.86 m	28	35	(Romania) Zalău
7	RW	Adriana Nechita	14 November 1983 (aged 31)	1.65 m	130	318	(Romania) HCM Baia Mare
8	LB	Cristina Neagu	26 August 1988 (aged 26)	1.80 m	126	502	(Montenegro) Budućnost
9	CB	Aurelia Brădeanu	5 May 1979 (aged 35)	1.79 m	253	637	(Romania) Corona Brașov
10	RB	Adriana Ţăcălie	29 January 1989 (aged 25)	1.80 m	38	58	(Romania) Corona Brașov
11	RB	Gabriela Perianu	20 June 1994 (aged 20)	1.87 m	21	41	(Romania) Dunărea Brăila
12	GK	Ionica Munteanu	7 January 1979 (aged 35)	1.79 m	15	0	(Romania) SCM Craiova
15	LW	Valentina Ardean-Elisei	5 June 1982 (aged 32)	1.75 m	201	798	(Romania) HCM Baia Mare
16	GK	Denisa Dedu	27 September 1994 (aged 20)	1.81 m	12	2	(Romania) Corona Brașov
17	P	Georgiana Ciuciulete	23 April 1987 (aged 27)	1.70 m	24	37	(Romania) Zalău
19	LB	Cristina Zamfir	29 September 1989 (aged 25)	1.83 m	6	12	(Romania) Corona Brașov
23	CB	Daniela Băbeanu	18 November 1988 (aged 26)	1.72 m	30	61	(Romania) HCM Roman
27	LW	Camelia Hotea	27 October 1984 (aged 30)	1.74 m	35	56	(Romania) Corona Brașov
30	GK	Paula Ungureanu	30 March 1980 (aged 34)	1.80 m	138	2	(Romania) HCM Baia Mare
85	P	Florina Chintoan	6 December 1985 (aged 29)	1.78 m	106	140	(Romania) Universitatea Cluj
89	RW	Laura Chiper	21 August 1989 (aged 25)	1.73 m	13	10	(Romania) Corona Brașov

=== Ukraine ===
Head coach: Leonid Ratner

No.	Pos.	Name	Date of birth (age)	Height	App.	Goals	Club
1	GK	Yelyzaveta Hilyazetdinova	15 August 1994 (aged 20)	1.69 m	4	0	(Ukraine) Galytchanka
2	RB	Olga Laiuk	17 May 1984 (aged 30)	1.82 m	27	61	(Turkey) Muratpaşa Bld. SK
3	LB	Iuliia Andriichuk	17 May 1992 (aged 22)	1.85 m	5	3	(Belarus) Gomel
4	LB	Anastasiya Pidpalova	5 January 1982 (aged 32)	1.92 m	63	240	(France) Cercle Bourgogne
5	P	Iryna Shutska	5 March 1983 (aged 31)	1.80 m	75	102	(Romania) CSM Ploieşti
7	LW	Viktoriya Borshchenko	5 January 1986 (aged 28)	1.72 m	46	154	(Russia) Rostov-Don
12	GK	Viktoriya Tymoshenkova	4 November 1983 (aged 31)	1.83 m	36	0	(Romania) HCM Roman
16	GK	Natalya Parkhomenko	21 March 1979 (aged 35)	1.80 m	33	0	(Russia) Kuban Krasnodar
17	RB	Olha Nikolayenko	5 April 1983 (aged 31)	1.78 m	44	173	(Hungary) Békéscsaba
18	LB	Olena Umanets	3 September 1990 (aged 24)	1.78 m	4	5	(Ukraine) Karpaty Uzhhorod
19	P	Valeriia Zoria	23 April 1987 (aged 27)	1.80 m	11	18	(Belarus) Gomel
21	CB	Anna Redka	21 January 1989 (aged 25)	1.66 m	10	13	(Belarus) Gomel
23	CB	Iryna Glibko	18 February 1990 (aged 24)	1.70 m	10	30	(Romania) CSM București
24	CB	Tamara Smbatian	19 March 1995 (age 31)	1.75 m	3	4	(Ukraine) Galytchanka
35	P	Iryna Stelmakh	18 August 1993 (aged 21)	1.92 m	4	2	(Ukraine) Galytchanka
44	RW	Nataliia Volovnyk	13 March 1993 (aged 21)	1.70 m	1	4	(Ukraine) Galytchanka
77	P	Olga Peredery	12 April 1994 (aged 20)	1.80 m	3	7	(Russia) Rostov-Don

== Group C ==
=== Croatia ===
Head coach: Vladimir Canjuga

An 18-player squad was announced on 25 November 2014.

No.	Pos.	Name	Date of birth (age)	Height	App.	Goals	Club
2	CB	Miranda Tatari	20 September 1983 (aged 31)	1.74 m	117	342	(Croatia) Podravka Koprivnica
4	LB	Maja Kožnjak	16 April 1985 (aged 29)	1.72 m	74	75	(Croatia) Lokomotiva Zagreb
5	RW	Aneta Peraica	29 July 1985 (aged 29)	1.74 m	28	58	(Croatia) Lokomotiva Zagreb
7	LW	Tea Grubišić	3 December 1985 (aged 29)	1.76 m	25	26	(Croatia) Lokomotiva Zagreb
8	RW	Anita Gaće	14 April 1983 (aged 31)	1.77 m	140	188	(Russia) Dinamo Volgograd
9	LB	Ćamila Mičijević	8 September 1994 (aged 20)	1.94 m	5	4	(Croatia) Zamet
12	GK	Marta Žderić	20 April 1990 (aged 24)	1.83 m	50	0	(Montenegro) Budućnost
13	RB	Lidija Horvat	5 May 1982 (aged 32)	1.84 m	164	351	(Croatia) Lokomotiva Zagreb
14	CB	Kristina Elez	22 May 1987 (aged 27)	1.80 m	133	414	(Croatia) Podravka Koprivnica
15	LB	Andrea Penezić	13 November 1985 (aged 29)	1.86 m	126	527	(North Macedonia) Vardar
16	GK	Ivana Jelčić	16 March 1980 (aged 34)	1.79 m	192	0	(Croatia) Lokomotiva Zagreb
17	P	Katarina Ježić	19 December 1992 (aged 21)	1.73 m	39	65	(Croatia) Lokomotiva Zagreb
19	LW	Maja Zebić	30 May 1982 (aged 32)	1.78 m	157	428	(North Macedonia) Vardar
20	P	Vesna Milanović-Litre	30 May 1986 (aged 28)	1.80 m	86	154	(Hungary) Győri ETO
25	P	Dragica Džono	24 May 1987 (aged 27)	1.84 m	31	16	(Croatia) Podravka Koprivnica
26	RB	Žana Čović	20 August 1989 (aged 25)	1.80 m	24	13	(Germany) SG BBM Bietigheim
29	RB	Sonja Bašić	26 November 1987 (aged 27)	1.82 m	46	67	(Croatia) Lokomotiva Zagreb

=== Germany ===
Head coach: (Denmark) Heine Jensen

A 19-player squad was announced on 13 November 2014. 17 players were left on 1 December 2014. The final squad was announced on 3 December 2014.

No.	Pos.	Name	Date of birth (age)	Height	App.	Goals	Club
2	RW	Marlene Zapf	6 January 1990 (aged 24)	1.70 m	45	116	(Germany) TuS Metzingen
5	LB	Saskia Lang	19 December 1986 (aged 27)	1.79 m	47	28	(Germany) HC Leipzig
8	P	Anne Müller	5 July 1983 (aged 31)	1.74 m	161	217	(Germany) HC Leipzig
10	CB	Anna Loerper	18 November 1984 (aged 30)	1.64 m	195	323	(Germany) TuS Metzingen
11	CB/LB	Xenia Smits	22 April 1994 (aged 20)	1.83 m	2	1	(Germany) HSG Blomberg-Lippe
12	GK	Katja Schülke	18 March 1984 (aged 30)	1.78 m	96	0	(Germany) HC Leipzig
14	RB	Ewgenija Minevskaja	31 October 1992 (aged 22)	1.82 m	29	47	(Germany) TuS Metzingen
15	CB	Kim Naidzinavicius	6 April 1991 (aged 23)	1.81 m	40	60	(Germany) Bayer Leverkusen
16	GK	Clara Woltering	2 March 1983 (aged 31)	1.78 m	174	0	(Montenegro) ŽRK Budućnost
18	LB	Laura Steinbach	2 August 1985 (aged 29)	1.81 m	110	232	(Germany) Spreefüxxe Berlin
20	P	Anja Althaus	3 September 1982 (aged 32)	1.74 m	232	507	(North Macedonia) Vardar
21	LB	Nadja Nadgornaja	22 September 1988 (aged 26)	1.84 m	57	193	(Germany) Thüringer HC
22	RB	Susann Müller	26 May 1988 (age 38)	1.86 m	77	260	(Hungary) Győri ETO
23	RW	Svenja Huber	23 October 1985 (aged 29)	1.68 m	15	52	(Germany) Thüringer HC
26	LW	Angie Geschke	24 May 1985 (aged 29)	1.77 m	69	109	(Germany) VfL Oldenburg
31	CB	Kerstin Wohlbold	11 January 1984 (aged 30)	1.70 m	47	96	(Germany) Thüringer HC
33	P	Luisa Schulze	14 September 1990 (aged 24)	1.92 m	36	31	(Germany) HC Leipzig

=== Netherlands ===
Head coach: Henk Groener

The squad was announced on 28 November 2014.

No.	Pos.	Name	Date of birth (age)	Height	App.	Goals	Club
2	GK	Tess Wester	19 May 1993 (aged 21)	1.78 m	12	0	(Germany) VfL Oldenburg
5	LB	Jessy Kramer	16 February 1990 (aged 24)	1.77 m	64	72	(Norway) IK Våg
6	RB	Laura van der Heijden	27 June 1990 (aged 24)	1.72 m	115	382	(Denmark) Team Esbjerg
7	RW	Debbie Bont	9 December 1990 (aged 23)	1.74 m	88	175	(Netherlands) SERCODAK Dalfsen
9	RB	Sanne van Olphen	13 March 1989 (aged 25)	1.77 m	33	52	(France) Toulon St-Cyr
10	P	Danick Snelder	22 May 1990 (aged 24)	1.78 m	88	220	(Germany) Thüringer HC
11	CB	Lynn Knippenborg	7 January 1992 (aged 22)	1.75 m	25	47	(Norway) IK Våg
13	P	Yvette Broch	23 December 1990 (aged 23)	1.85 m	54	100	(France) Metz
17	CB	Cornelia Groot	4 May 1988 (aged 26)	1.75 m	65	180	(Denmark) Midtjylland
18	LB	Kelly Dulfer	21 March 1994 (aged 20)	1.86 m	15	11	(Netherlands) SERCODAK Dalfsen
21	LW	Michelle Goos	27 December 1989 (aged 24)	1.78 m	26	50	(Netherlands) VOC Amsterdam
22	P	Esther Schop	22 January 1990 (aged 24)	1.76 m	6	1	(Netherlands) SERCODAK Dalfsen
23	GK	Jasmina Jankovic	6 December 1986 (aged 28)	1.68 m	41	0	(Germany) TuS Metzingen
24	LW	Martine Smeets	5 May 1990 (aged 24)	1.72 m	32	66	(Germany) Thüringer HC
30	RW	Jurswailly Luciano	25 March 1991 (aged 23)	1.71 m	28	59	(France) Metz
79	CB	Estavana Polman	5 August 1992 (aged 22)	1.74 m	59	155	(Denmark) Team Esbjerg

=== Sweden ===
Head coach: Tomas Sivertsson / (Denmark) Helle Thomsen

The squad was announced on 12 November 2014.

No.	Pos.	Name	Date of birth (age)	Height	App.	Goals	Club
1	GK	Johanna Bundsen	3 June 1991 (aged 23)	1.85 m	3	0	(Sweden) IK Sävehof
2	P	Ulrika Ågren	13 July 1987 (aged 27)	1.69 m	60	92	(Germany) Buxtehuder SV
5	RW	Hanna Fogelström	8 November 1990 (aged 24)	1.79 m	58	97	(France) Toulon St-Cyr
7	P	Linn Blohm	20 May 1992 (aged 22)	1.79 m	20	40	(Denmark) Team Tvis Holstebro
8	LB	Jamina Roberts	28 May 1990 (aged 24)	1.70 m	76	115	(Denmark) Team Tvis Holstebro
9	LW	Louise Sand	27 December 1992 (aged 21)	1.75 m	27	39	(Sweden) IK Sävehof
12	GK	Filippa Idéhn	15 August 1990 (aged 24)	1.83 m	29	0	(Sweden) IK Sävehof
15	LB	Johanna Ahlm	3 October 1987 (aged 27)	1.75 m	112	397	(Denmark) Team Esbjerg
17	CB	Linnea Torstenson	30 March 1983 (aged 31)	1.80 m	143	595	(Romania) CSM București
20	CB	Isabelle Gulldén	29 June 1989 (aged 25)	1.79 m	125	424	(Denmark) Viborg HK
22	LW	Jessica Helleberg	20 February 1986 (aged 28)	1.72 m	71	107	(Denmark) HC Odense
24	RW	Nathalie Hagman	19 July 1991 (aged 23)	1.67 m	57	94	(Denmark) Team Tvis Holstebro
27	CB	Sabina Jacobsen	24 March 1989 (aged 25)	1.80 m	52	91	(Denmark) Midtjylland
28	RB	Ida Odén	14 April 1987 (aged 27)	1.72 m	28	57	(Sweden) IK Sävehof
29	LB	Jenny Alm	10 April 1989 (aged 25)	1.83 m	44	95	(Sweden) IK Sävehof
31	RB	Anna-Maria Johansson	15 February 1982 (aged 32)	1.84 m	66	140	(Sweden) Skövde HF

== Group D ==
=== France ===
Head coach: Alain Portes

An 18-player squad was announced on 1 December 2014.

No.	Pos.	Name	Date of birth (age)	Height	App.	Goals	Club
1	GK	Laura Glauser	20 August 1993 (aged 21)	1.80 m	10	0	(France) Metz
4	P	Nina Kamto Njitam	25 June 1983 (aged 31)	1.78 m	198	367	(France) Metz
5	RB	Camille Ayglon	21 May 1985 (aged 29)	1.80 m	158	334	(France) HBC Nîmes
6	RB	Koumba Cissé	4 June 1991 (aged 23)	1.73 m	15	22	(France) Le Havre
7	CB	Allison Pineau	2 May 1989 (aged 25)	1.81 m	145	347	(Slovenia) Krim
8	P	Laurisa Landre	27 October 1985 (aged 29)	1.74 m	5	11	(France) Le Havre
9	LW	Paule Baudouin	25 October 1984 (aged 30)	1.72 m	197	605	(France) Metz
10	CB	Grace Zaadi	7 July 1993 (aged 21)	1.71 m	19	33	(France) Metz
11	RW	Marie Prouvensier	12 March 1994 (aged 20)	1.65 m	0	0	(France) Cercle Dijon Bourgogne
12	GK	Amandine Leynaud	2 May 1986 (aged 28)	1.78 m	143	1	(North Macedonia) Vardar
17	LW	Siraba Dembélé	28 June 1986 (aged 28)	1.72 m	175	568	(North Macedonia) Vardar
21	LB	Alice Lévêque	9 May 1989 (aged 25)	1.82 m	19	6	(France) Mios Biganos
22	RB	Marie François	14 August 1993 (aged 21)	1.77 m	5	6	(France) Cercle Dijon Bourgogne
23	GK	Armelle Attingré	15 January 1989 (aged 25)	1.74 m	16	0	(France) Issy Paris
27	CB	Estelle Nze Minko	11 August 1991 (aged 23)	1.76 m	1	0	(France) Nantes LA
28	RB	Marie-Paule Gnabouyou	4 March 1988 (age 38)	1.85 m	66	90	(France) Toulon St-Cyr
29	LB	Gnonsiane Niombla	9 July 1990 (aged 24)	1.72 m	22	45	(France) Fleury Loiret
64	RB	Alexandra Lacrabère	27 April 1987 (aged 27)	1.72 m	140	370	(France) OGC Nice

=== Montenegro ===
Head coach: Dragan Adžić

A 16-player squad was announced on 18 November 2014.

No.	Pos.	Name	Date of birth (age)	Height	App.	Goals	Club
1	GK	Marina Vukčević	24 August 1993 (aged 21)	1.78 m	64	0	(Montenegro) Budućnost
2	RW	Radmila Miljanić-Petrović	19 April 1988 (aged 26)	1.74 m	112	145	(Montenegro) Budućnost
3	LW	Biljana Pavićević	12 May 1988 (aged 26)	1.70 m	30	51	(Montenegro) Budućnost
4	RW	Jovanka Radičević	23 October 1986 (aged 28)	1.69 m	112	589	(North Macedonia) Vardar
8	LB	Marija Jovanović	26 December 1985 (aged 28)	1.82 m	106	445	(France) Issy Paris
10	CB	Anđela Bulatović	15 January 1987 (aged 27)	1.75 m	104	168	(Russia) Rostov-Don
15	RB	Andrea Klikovac	5 May 1991 (aged 23)	1.74 m	24	7	(North Macedonia) Vardar
16	GK	Mirjana Milenković	14 March 1985 (aged 29)	1.83 m	60	0	(Croatia) Podravka Koprivnica
19	LB	Djurdjina Jauković	24 February 1997 (aged 17)	1.85 m	6	7	(Montenegro) Danilovgrad
22	GK	Sonja Barjaktarović	11 September 1986 (aged 28)	1.80 m	107	0	(Russia) Rostov-Don
25	RB	Djurdjina Malović	5 May 1996 (aged 18)	1.82 m	11	11	(Montenegro) Danilovgrad
26	P	Suzana Lazović	28 January 1992 (aged 22)	1.76 m	74	82	(Montenegro) Budućnost
32	RB	Katarina Bulatović	15 November 1984 (aged 30)	1.86 m	44	263	(Montenegro) Budućnost
66	P	Ema Ramusović	28 November 1996 (aged 18)	1.82 m	4	8	(Montenegro) Budućnost
77	LW	Majda Mehmedović	25 May 1990 (aged 24)	1.69 m	69	137	(Montenegro) Budućnost
80	LB	Jelena Despotović	30 April 1994 (aged 20)	1.83 m	21	21	(Montenegro) Budućnost
90	CB	Milena Knežević	12 March 1990 (aged 24)	1.78 m	96	250	(Montenegro) Budućnost

=== Serbia ===
Head coach: Saša Bošković

No.	Pos.	Name	Date of birth (age)	Height	App.	Goals	Club
3	RW	Katarina Krpež	2 May 1988 (aged 26)	1.68 m	93	193	(Hungary) Érd
4	RB	Jelena Popović	4 September 1984 (aged 30)	1.71 m	109	177	(France) Nantes LA
6	LB	Katarina Stepanović	15 January 1985 (aged 29)	1.86 m	8	20	(Serbia) Radnički Kragujevac
7	CB	Andrea Lekić	6 September 1987 (aged 27)	1.78 m	93	464	(North Macedonia) Vardar
9	RB	Jelena Živković	6 July 1991 (aged 23)	1.84 m	53	69	(Croatia) Podravka Koprivnica
11	LB	Sanja Damnjanović	25 May 1987 (aged 27)	1.77 m	106	426	(Denmark) Viborg HK
15	RB	Anđela Janjušević	15 June 1995 (aged 19)	1.78 m	3	0	(Serbia) Radnički Kragujevac
16	GK	Jovana Risović	7 October 1993 (aged 21)	1.70 m	43	2	(Serbia) Radnički Kragujevac
17	P	Sanja Rajović	18 May 1981 (aged 33)	1.73 m	75	102	(Croatia) Lokomotiva Zagreb
21	CB	Dijana Radojević	2 April 1990 (aged 24)	1.70 m	5	0	(Serbia) ŽORK Jagodina
26	LB	Biljana Filipović	12 January 1986 (aged 28)	1.89 m	42	75	(France) OGC Nice
27	GK	Katarina Tomašević	6 February 1984 (aged 30)	1.79 m	70	0	(Hungary) Ferencváros
30	LW	Jelena Nišavić	17 September 1980 (aged 34)	1.68 m	111	155	(Serbia) Radnički Kragujevac
33	LB	Jovana Stoiljković	30 September 1988 (aged 26)	1.82 m	43	59	(France) Nantes LA
71	CB	Kristina Liščević	20 October 1989 (age 36)	1.73 m	49	44	(France) Metz
72	P	Dragana Cvijić	15 March 1990 (aged 24)	1.85 m	70	191	(Montenegro) Budućnost
83	P	Marija Lojpur	10 August 1983 (aged 31)	1.79 m	45	69	(Hungary) Szeged KKSE

=== Slovakia ===
Head coach: Dušan Poloz

An 18-player squad was announced on 30 October 2014.

No.	Pos.	Name	Date of birth (age)	Height	App.	Goals	Club
1	GK	Simona Súlovská	2 September 1990 (aged 24)	1.70 m	21	0	(Slovakia) Slávia Partizánske
3	CB	Monika Rajnohová	26 May 1993 (aged 21)	1.73 m	29	26	(Czech Republic) Slavia Prague
4	RW	Selma Blažeková	2 March 1991 (aged 23)	1.64 m	23	19	(Slovakia) Slávia Partizánske
8	LB	Andrea Kertészová	4 November 1988 (aged 26)	1.77 m	14	24	(Slovakia) Slovan Duslo Šaľa
10	CB	Petra Beňušková	7 February 1982 (aged 32)	1.70 m	75	210	(France) Stella St-Maur
11	P	Andrea Czanik	29 October 1979 (aged 35)	1.77 m	13	15	(Germany) DJK/MJC Trier
12	GK	Lucia Gubiková	11 February 1993 (aged 21)	1.79 m	28	0	(Slovakia) IUVENTA Michalovce
13	RB	Katarína Dubajová	9 December 1978 (aged 35)	1.79 m	217	835	(Poland) MKS Nowy Sącz
16	GK	Žaneta Tóthová	6 August 1984 (aged 30)	1.80 m	71	3	(France) Stella St-Maur
21	RB	Simona Szarková	2 January 1992 (aged 22)	1.74 m	22	54	(Czech Republic) Baník Most
22	CB	Klaudia Michnová	4 June 1990 (aged 24)	1.66 m	24	44	(Slovakia) Slávia Partizánske
24	LW	Lucia Súkenníková	22 June 1988 (aged 26)	1.65 m	45	101	(Czech Republic) Baník Most
28	RW	Lýdia Jakubisová	14 October 1981 (aged 33)	1.69 m	99	414	(Germany) Thüringer HC
33	LB	Martina Školková	21 December 1984 (aged 29)	1.73 m	69	134	(France) Cercle Dijon Bourgogne
55	RB	Tetyana Trehubová	14 March 1989 (aged 25)	1.74 m	8	39	(Slovakia) IUVENTA Michalovce
66	LW	Réka Bíziková	21 December 1991 (aged 22)	1.69 m	14	16	(Slovakia) Slovan Duslo Šaľa
77	P	Dominika Horňáková	1 February 1991 (aged 23)	1.74 m	16	21	(Slovakia) IUVENTA Michalovce
78	P	Eva Minárčiková	3 July 1992 (aged 22)	1.73 m	7	1	(Czech Republic) Sokol Poruba
