= Handball at the 2015 Summer Universiade – Women's tournament =

Women's handball at the 2015 Summer Universiade was held in Gwangju, South Korea from 6 to 13 July 2015.

== Teams ==
Pool A

- South Korea
- Ukraine
- Japan
- Montenegro
- Romania
- Serbia

Pool B

- Brazil
- China
- Russia
- Uruguay
- Czech Republic
- Slovakia

== Results ==
All times are Korea Standard Time (UTC+09:00)

=== Preliminary round ===
==== Group A ====
| Team | Pld | W | D | L | GF | GA | GD | Pts |
|---|---|---|---|---|---|---|---|---|
| South Korea | 5 | 4 | 1 | 0 | 175 | 125 | 50 | 9 |
| Serbia | 5 | 4 | 0 | 1 | 133 | 117 | 16 | 8 |
| Romania | 5 | 1 | 3 | 1 | 135 | 131 | 4 | 5 |
| Ukraine | 5 | 2 | 0 | 3 | 127 | 139 | –12 | 4 |
| Montenegro | 5 | 1 | 1 | 3 | 114 | 139 | –25 | 3 |
| Japan | 5 | 0 | 1 | 4 | 129 | 162 | –33 | 1 |

| Team qualified to the gold-medal match |
| Team qualified to the bronze-medal match |

| 6 July; 14:00 | Japan | 27–28 | Montenegro | Gochang County Gymnasium, Gochang |
| 6 July; 14:00 | Tada 7 | (15–15) | Jauković 16 | Gochang County Gymnasium, Gochang |
| 6 July; 14:00 | 2× (yellow card) 5× (suspension) 1× (red card) | Report | 3× (yellow card) 4× (suspension) | Gochang County Gymnasium, Gochang |

| 6 July; 14:00 | Romania | 25–27 | Serbia | Gurye Indoor Gymnasium, Gurye |
| 6 July; 14:00 | zamfirescu 7 | (12–12) | Georgijev 6 | Gurye Indoor Gymnasium, Gurye |
| 6 July; 14:00 | 4× (yellow card) 6× (suspension) | Report | 3× (yellow card) 5× (suspension) | Gurye Indoor Gymnasium, Gurye |

| 6 July; 14:00 | South Korea | 39–28 | Ukraine | Naju Indoor Gymnasium, Naju |
| 6 July; 14:00 | Kim, Yu 7 | (19–12) | Stelmakh 8 | Naju Indoor Gymnasium, Naju |
| 6 July; 14:00 | 2× (yellow card) 4× (suspension) | Report | 2× (yellow card) 2× (suspension) | Naju Indoor Gymnasium, Naju |

| 7 July; 14:00 | Serbia | 25–30 | South Korea | Gochang County Gymnasium, Gochang |
| 7 July; 14:00 | Janjušević 7 | (12–15) | Kim 13 | Gochang County Gymnasium, Gochang |
| 7 July; 14:00 | 3× (yellow card) 3× (suspension) | Report | 3× (yellow card) 4× (suspension) | Gochang County Gymnasium, Gochang |

| 7 July; 14:00 | Montenegro | 25–25 | Romania | Gurye Indoor Gymnasium, Gurye |
| 7 July; 14:00 | Jauković 6 | (13–14) | Zamfirescu 10 | Gurye Indoor Gymnasium, Gurye |
| 7 July; 14:00 | 2× (yellow card) 4× (suspension) | Report | 3× (yellow card) 2× (suspension) | Gurye Indoor Gymnasium, Gurye |

| 7 July; 14:00 | Ukraine | 31–23 | Japan | Naju Indoor Gymnasium, Naju |
| 7 July; 14:00 | Stelmakh 9 | (13–10) | Kawashima, Akiyama 6 | Naju Indoor Gymnasium, Naju |
| 7 July; 14:00 | 3× (yellow card) 3× (suspension) | Report | 3× (yellow card) 6× (suspension) | Naju Indoor Gymnasium, Naju |

| 9 July; 14:00 | Romania | 32–32 | Japan | Gochang County Gymnasium, Gochang |
| 9 July; 14:00 | Tiron 10 | (18–14) | Kawashima 9 | Gochang County Gymnasium, Gochang |
| 9 July; 14:00 | 3× (yellow card) 2× (suspension) | Report | 3× (yellow card) 4× (suspension) | Gochang County Gymnasium, Gochang |

| 9 July; 14:00 | South Korea | 39–26 | Montenegro | Gurye Indoor Gymnasium, Gurye |
| 9 July; 14:00 | Kim 7 | (18–11) | Jauković 6 | Gurye Indoor Gymnasium, Gurye |
| 9 July; 14:00 | 1× (yellow card) 3× (suspension) | Report | 3× (yellow card) 4× (suspension) | Gurye Indoor Gymnasium, Gurye |

| 9 July; 14:00 | Serbia | 29–21 | Ukraine | Naju Indoor Gymnasium, Naju |
| 9 July; 14:00 | Janjušević, Radojević 7 | (14–8) | Stelmakh 6 | Naju Indoor Gymnasium, Naju |
| 9 July; 14:00 | 1× (yellow card) 2× (suspension) | Report | 3× (yellow card) 4× (suspension) | Naju Indoor Gymnasium, Naju |

| 10 July; 14:00 | Ukraine | 22–28 | Romania | Gurye Indoor Gymnasium, Gurye |
| 10 July; 14:00 | Stelmakh 9 | (8–11) | Tiron 14 | Gurye Indoor Gymnasium, Gurye |
| 10 July; 14:00 | 3× (yellow card) 5× (suspension) | Report | 3× (yellow card) 4× (suspension) | Gurye Indoor Gymnasium, Gurye |

| 10 July; 14:00 | Japan | 21–42 | South Korea | Gochang County Gymnasium, Gochang |
| 10 July; 14:00 | Ohyama, Kawashima 5 | (8–21) | Choi 6 | Gochang County Gymnasium, Gochang |
| 10 July; 14:00 | 2× (yellow card) | Report | 3× (yellow card) 1× (suspension) | Gochang County Gymnasium, Gochang |

| 10 July; 14:00 | Montenegro | 15–23 | Serbia | Naju Indoor Gymnasium, Naju |
| 10 July; 14:00 | Three players with 3 | (5–11) | Janjušević 6 | Naju Indoor Gymnasium, Naju |
| 10 July; 14:00 | 2× (yellow card) 3× (suspension) | Report | 2× (yellow card) 1× (suspension) | Naju Indoor Gymnasium, Naju |

| 12 July; 14:00 | Montenegro | 20–25 | Ukraine | Gurye Indoor Gymnasium, Gurye |
| 12 July; 14:00 | Grbić 7 | (10–13) | Stelmakh 7 | Gurye Indoor Gymnasium, Gurye |
| 12 July; 14:00 | 4× (yellow card) 4× (suspension) | Report | 3× (yellow card) 2× (suspension) | Gurye Indoor Gymnasium, Gurye |

| 12 July; 14:00 | Serbia | 29–26 | Japan | Gochang County Gymnasium, Gochang |
| 12 July; 14:00 | Georgijev 10 | (13–13) | Tada, Kawashima 6 | Gochang County Gymnasium, Gochang |
| 12 July; 14:00 | 3× (yellow card) 4× (suspension) | Report | 3× (yellow card) 4× (suspension) | Gochang County Gymnasium, Gochang |

| 12 July; 14:00 | South Korea | 25–25 | Romania | Naju Indoor Gymnasium, Naju |
| 12 July; 14:00 | Migyeong 8 | (15–10) | Tiron 9 | Naju Indoor Gymnasium, Naju |
| 12 July; 14:00 | 3× (yellow card) 7× (suspension) | Report | 3× (yellow card) 6× (suspension) | Naju Indoor Gymnasium, Naju |

==== Group B ====
| Team | Pld | W | D | L | GF | GA | GD | Pts |
|---|---|---|---|---|---|---|---|---|
| Russia | 5 | 5 | 0 | 0 | 178 | 84 | 94 | 10 |
| Czech Republic | 5 | 4 | 0 | 1 | 135 | 120 | 15 | 8 |
| Brazil | 5 | 3 | 0 | 2 | 133 | 105 | 28 | 6 |
| China | 5 | 2 | 0 | 3 | 110 | 137 | –27 | 4 |
| Slovakia | 5 | 1 | 0 | 4 | 94 | 116 | –22 | 2 |
| Uruguay | 5 | 0 | 0 | 5 | 73 | 161 | –88 | 0 |

| Team qualified to the gold-medal match |
| Team qualified to the bronze-medal match |

| 6 July; 16:00 | Brazil | 27–17 | China | Naju Indoor Gymnasium, Naju |
| 6 July; 16:00 | Rodrigues 6 | (13–10) | Huang 5 | Naju Indoor Gymnasium, Naju |
| 6 July; 16:00 | 3× (yellow card) 5× (suspension) | Report | 3× (yellow card) 4× (suspension) | Naju Indoor Gymnasium, Naju |

| 6 July; 16:00 | Russia | 41–6 | Uruguay | Gochang County Gymnasium, Gochang |
| 6 July; 16:00 | Reshetnikova, Vyakhireva 7 | (19–4) | Garcia 4 | Gochang County Gymnasium, Gochang |
| 6 July; 16:00 | 1× (yellow card) | Report | 2× (yellow card) 6× (suspension) | Gochang County Gymnasium, Gochang |

| 6 July; 16:00 | Czech Republic | 22–17 | Slovakia | Gurye Indoor Gymnasium, Gurye |
| 6 July; 16:00 | Adamkova 6 | (11–7) | Blazekova, Habankova 5 | Gurye Indoor Gymnasium, Gurye |
| 6 July; 16:00 | 3× (yellow card) 2× (suspension) | Report | 3× (yellow card) 1× (suspension) | Gurye Indoor Gymnasium, Gurye |

| 7 July; 16:00 | Uruguay | 11–33 | Brazil | Gurye Indoor Gymnasium, Gurye |
| 7 July; 16:00 | Jaurena 4 | (6–13) | Araújo 7 | Gurye Indoor Gymnasium, Gurye |
| 7 July; 16:00 | 2× (yellow card) 5× (suspension) | Report | 3× (yellow card) | Gurye Indoor Gymnasium, Gurye |

| 7 July; 16:00 | China | 23–32 | Czech Republic | Naju Indoor Gymnasium, Naju |
| 7 July; 16:00 | Huang 10 | (9–16) | Kubackova 7 | Naju Indoor Gymnasium, Naju |
| 7 July; 16:00 | 4× (yellow card) 4× (suspension) | Report | 2× (yellow card) 1× (suspension) | Naju Indoor Gymnasium, Naju |

| 7 July; 16:00 | Slovakia | 14–29 | Russia | Gochang County Gymnasium, Gochang |
| 7 July; 16:00 | Minarcikova, Gajdosova 4 | (10–12) | Vyakhireva 9 | Gochang County Gymnasium, Gochang |
| 7 July; 16:00 | 2× (yellow card) 5× (suspension) | Report | 3× (yellow card) 2× (suspension) | Gochang County Gymnasium, Gochang |

| 9 July; 16:00 | Brazil | 26–16 | Slovakia | Gochang County Gymnasium, Gochang |
| 9 July; 16:00 | Anselmo 5 | (15–4) | Kluckova 6 | Gochang County Gymnasium, Gochang |
| 9 July; 16:00 | 3× (yellow card) 4× (suspension) | Report | 3× (yellow card) 1× (suspension) | Gochang County Gymnasium, Gochang |

| 9 July; 16:00 | Russia | 37–21 | Czech Republic | Naju Indoor Gymnasium, Naju |
| 9 July; 16:00 | Vyakhireva 7 | (17–11) | Adamkova 6 | Naju Indoor Gymnasium, Naju |
| 9 July; 16:00 | 3× (yellow card) 4× (suspension) | Report | 3× (yellow card) 4× (suspension) | Naju Indoor Gymnasium, Naju |

| 9 July; 16:00 | Uruguay | 20–28 | China | Gurye Indoor Gymnasium, Gurye |
| 9 July; 16:00 | Lachaise 6 | (8–11) | Si 6 | Gurye Indoor Gymnasium, Gurye |
| 9 July; 16:00 | 3× (yellow card) 4× (suspension) | Report | 2× (yellow card) 2× (suspension) | Gurye Indoor Gymnasium, Gurye |

| 10 July; 16:00 | China | 22–39 | Russia | Gurye Indoor Gymnasium, Gurye |
| 10 July; 16:00 | Huang 7 | (11–20) | Garanina 8 | Gurye Indoor Gymnasium, Gurye |
| 10 July; 16:00 | 2× (yellow card) 3× (suspension) | Report | 2× (yellow card) 3× (suspension) | Gurye Indoor Gymnasium, Gurye |

| 10 July; 16:00 | Czech Republic | 29–26 | Brazil | Gochang County Gymnasium, Gochang |
| 10 July; 16:00 | Kubackova 10 | (15–14) | Goncalves 8 | Gochang County Gymnasium, Gochang |
| 10 July; 16:00 | 4× (yellow card) | Report | 4× (yellow card) 3× (suspension) | Gochang County Gymnasium, Gochang |

| 10 July; 16:00 | Slovakia | 28–19 | Uruguay | Naju Indoor Gymnasium, Naju |
| 10 July; 16:00 | Three players with 5 | (13–9) | Jaurena 5 | Naju Indoor Gymnasium, Naju |
| 10 July; 16:00 | 1× (yellow card) | Report | 2× (yellow card) 5× (suspension) | Naju Indoor Gymnasium, Naju |

| 12 July; 16:00 | Brazil | 21–32 | Russia | Naju Indoor Gymnasium, Naju |
| 12 July; 16:00 | Araújo 5 | (9–15) | Makeeva 6 | Naju Indoor Gymnasium, Naju |
| 12 July; 16:00 | 3× (yellow card) 4× (suspension) | Report | 3× (yellow card) 5× (suspension) | Naju Indoor Gymnasium, Naju |

| 12 July; 16:00 | Slovakia | 19–20 | China | Gochang County Gymnasium, Gochang |
| 12 July; 16:00 | Kostelna 7 | (10–11) | Huang 6 | Gochang County Gymnasium, Gochang |
| 12 July; 16:00 | 2× (yellow card) 1× (suspension) | Report | 3× (yellow card) 3× (suspension) | Gochang County Gymnasium, Gochang |

| 12 July; 16:00 | Uruguay | 17–31 | Czech Republic | Gurye Indoor Gymnasium, Gurye |
| 12 July; 16:00 | Gonzalez 6 | (10–18) | Adamkova, Stellnerova 8 | Gurye Indoor Gymnasium, Gurye |
| 12 July; 16:00 | 3× (yellow card) 4× (suspension) | Report | 3× (yellow card) 2× (suspension) | Gurye Indoor Gymnasium, Gurye |

=== 11th place match ===
| 13 July; 10:00 | Japan | 31–18 | Uruguay | Gochang County Gymnasium, Gochang |
| 13 July; 10:00 | Tamura, Yamashita 4 | (14–9) | Elzaurdia 6 | Gochang County Gymnasium, Gochang |
| 13 July; 10:00 | 2× (yellow card) 3× (suspension) | Report | 3× (yellow card) 4× (suspension) | Gochang County Gymnasium, Gochang |

=== 9th place match ===
| 13 July; 10:00 | Montenegro | 32–27 | Slovakia | Gurye Indoor Gymnasium, Gurye |
| 13 July; 10:00 | Pejović 6 | (12–12) | Minarcikova 7 | Gurye Indoor Gymnasium, Gurye |
| 13 July; 10:00 | 4× (yellow card) 3× (suspension) | Report | 4× (yellow card) 1× (suspension) | Gurye Indoor Gymnasium, Gurye |

=== 7th place match ===
| 13 July; 10:00 | Ukraine | 33–25 | China | Naju Indoor Gymnasium, Naju |
| 13 July; 10:00 | Konovalova 6 | (14–13) | Huang 8 | Naju Indoor Gymnasium, Naju |
| 13 July; 10:00 | 3× (yellow card) | Report | 3× (yellow card) 1× (suspension) | Naju Indoor Gymnasium, Naju |

=== 5th place match ===
| 13 July; 12:00 | Romania | 20–22 | Brazil | Gochang County Gymnasium, Gochang |
| 13 July; 12:00 | Zamfirescu, Preda 4 | (11–11) | Ansolin 4 | Gochang County Gymnasium, Gochang |
| 13 July; 12:00 | 3× (yellow card) 2× (suspension) | Report | 3× (yellow card) 5× (suspension) | Gochang County Gymnasium, Gochang |

=== Bronze-medal match ===
| 13 July; 14:00 | Serbia | 23–18 | Czech Republic | Naju Indoor Gymnasium, Naju |
| 13 July; 14:00 | Georgijev 6 | (12–12) | Salasova 5 | Naju Indoor Gymnasium, Naju |
| 13 July; 14:00 | 3× (yellow card) 6× (suspension) | Report | 2× (yellow card) 2× (suspension) | Naju Indoor Gymnasium, Naju |

=== Gold-medal match ===
| 13 July; 18:00 | South Korea | 36–38 | Russia | Naju Indoor Gymnasium, Naju |
| 13 July; 18:00 | Kim 8 | (15–22) | Vyakhireva 12 | Naju Indoor Gymnasium, Naju |
| 13 July; 18:00 | 3× (yellow card) 2× (suspension) | Report | 3× (yellow card) 4× (suspension) | Naju Indoor Gymnasium, Naju |

== Final standings and statistics ==
=== Final standings ===
| Rank | Team |
|---|---|
| Gold medal | Russia |
| Silver medal | South Korea |
| Bronze medal | Serbia |
| 4 | Czech Republic |
| 5 | Brazil |
| 6 | Romania |
| 7 | Ukraine |
| 8 | China |
| 9 | Montenegro |
| 10 | Slovakia |
| 11 | Japan |
| 12 | Uruguay |

=== Top scorers ===
| Rank | Player | Goals |
|---|---|---|
| 1 | (Ukraine) Iryna Stelmakh | 39 |
| 2 | (Romania) Bianca Tiron | 36 |
| 3 | (Russia) Anna Vyakhireva | 34 |
| 3 | (Serbia) Dijana Radojević | 34 |
| 5 | (China) Huang Yan | 32 |

=== Top goalkeepers ===
| Rank | Player | Saves | % |
|---|---|---|---|
| 1 | (Russia) Daria Vakhterova | 34 | 55 |
| 2 | (Russia) Elena Utkina | 37 | 49 |
| 3 | (Brazil) Naira Almeida | 36 | 47 |
