= 2022–23 Nemzeti Bajnokság I (women's handball) =

K&H női liga
- Season: 2022–23
- Dates: 26 August 2022 – May 2023
- Champions: Győri Audi ETO KC; 17th title
- Relegated: Siófok KC; Érd HC
- Champions League: Győri Audi ETO KC; FTC-Rail Cargo Hungaria; DVSC Schaeffler
- European League: Motherson Mosonmagyaróvár; Váci NKSE
- Matches: 182
- Goals: 9,873 (54.25 per match)
- Top goalscorer: (Hungary) Csenge Kuczora (203 goals)
- Biggest home win: 20 goals: FTC 40–20 NEKA (21 Mar)
- Biggest away win: 26 goals: KKC 9–35 DEB (13 May)
- Highest scoring: 75 goals: MOS 44–31 DUN (12 Oct)
- All statistics correct as of 1 June 2023.

The 2022–23 Nemzeti Bajnokság I (known as the K&H női kézilabda liga for sponsorship reasons) is the 72nd season of the Nemzeti Bajnokság I, Hungarian premier Handball league.

== Team information ==
As in the previous season, 14 teams played in the 2021–22 season. After the 2021–22 season, Szombathelyi KKA and Vasas SC were relegated to the 2022–23 Nemzeti Bajnokság I/B. They were replaced by two clubs from the 2021–22 Nemzeti Bajnokság I/B; Békéscsabai Előre NKSE and Nemzeti Kézilabda Akadémia.

Location of teams in 2022–23 Nemzeti Bajnokság I
Location of Budapest teams

Team	Location	Arena	Capacity
Alba Fehérvár KC	Székesfehérvár	KÖFÉM Sports Hall	1,000
Békéscsabai Előre NKSE	Békéscsaba	Municipal Sports Hall	2,300
Budaörs Handball	Budaörs	Városi Uszoda és Sportcsarnok	1,000
Debreceni VSC	Debrecen	Főnix Hall; Hódos Imre Sports Hall	8,500; 2,250
Dunaújvárosi Kohász KA	Dunaújváros	Municipal Sports Hall	1,200
Érd	Érd	Érd Aréna	2,200
Ferencvárosi TC	Budapest	Elek Gyula Aréna	1,300
Győri Audi ETO KC	Győr	Audi Aréna	5,500
Kisvárdai KC	Kisvárda	Municipal Sports Hall	1000
MTK Budapest	Budapest	Elektromos hall	500
Mosonmagyaróvári KC SE	Mosonmagyaróvár	UFM Aréna	1,100
NEKA	Balatonboglár	NEKA Sportcsarnok	678
Siófok KC	Siófok	Kiss Szilárd Sports Hall	1,500
Váci NKSE	Vác	Municipal Sports Hall	700

=== Personnel and kits ===
Following is the list of clubs competing in 2022–23 Nemzeti Bajnokság I, with their president, head coach, kit manufacturer and shirt sponsor.

Team	President	Head coach	Kit manufacturer	Shirt sponsor(s)
Alba Fehérvár KC	Imre Balássi	(Hungary) Krisztián Józsa	hummel	tippmix^{1}, Avis
Békéscsabai ENKSE	György Paláncz	(Hungary) Bálint Papp	Ziccer	tippmix^{1}, bmw-glass.hu, Budapest Bank
Budaörs	Tamás Neukum	(Hungary) Dániel Buday	Made by club	tippmix^{1}
Debreceni VSC	Zsolt Ábrók	(Hungary) Zoltán Szilágyi	adidas	tippmix^{1}, Schaeffler, Riska
Dunaújvárosi KKA	Attila Gurics	(Hungary) Tamás Rapatyi	hummel	tippmix^{1}, BH
Érd NK	dr. Anna Boldog	(Hungary) Judit Simics	Erima	tippmix^{1}
Ferencvárosi TC	Gábor Kubatov	(Hungary) Gábor Elek	Nike	tippmix^{1}, Rail Cargo Hungaria, Lidl, Budapest
Győri ETO KC	Anita Görbicz	(Spain) Ambros Martín	Mizuno	Audi, Győr, tippmix^{1}
Kisvárdai KC	Tamás Major	(Hungary) Valéria Szabó	hummel	tippmix^{1}, Master Good, Volkswagen
Mosonmagyaróvári KC SE	Guntham Turner	(Hungary) János Gyurka	adidas	tippmix^{1}, Eu-Fire
MTK Budapest	Tamás Deutsch	(Hungary) Attila Vágó	Nike	tippmix^{1}
Nemzeti Kézilabda Akadémia	Lajos Mocsai	(Hungary) Szilárd Kiss Jr.	hummel	tippmix^{1}
Siófok KC	János Fodor	(Slovenia) Uroš Bregar	Puma	tippmix^{1}, Peszter
Váci NKSE	Erika Kirsner	(Hungary) Gábor Herbert	hummel	tippmix^{1}, Praktiker

=== Managerial changes ===
Team	Outgoing manager	Manner of departure	Date of vacancy	Position in table	Replaced by	Date of appointment
Váci NKSE	(Hungary) Katalin Ottó	Mutual consent	End of 2021–22 season	Pre-season	(Hungary) Gábor Herbert	1 July 2022
MTK Budapest	(Hungary) Gergő Vida	Mutual consent	18 October 2022	11th	(Serbia) Marinko Kekezović	October 2022
MTK Budapest	(Serbia) Marinko Kekezović	Mutual consent	1 December 2022	10th	(Hungary) Attila Vágó	1 December 2022
Érd HC	(Hungary) Roland Horváth	Mutual consent	12 January 2023	14th	(Hungary) Judit Simics	17 January 2023
Kisvárdai KC	(Hungary) Botond Bakó	Mutual consent	15 February 2023	11th	(Hungary) Valéria Szabó	16 February 2023

== League table ==
Pos	Team	Pld	W	D	L	GF	GA	GD	Pts	Qualification or relegation
1	Győri Audi ETO KC	26	25	0	1	854	590	+264	50	Qualification to Champions League group stage
2	FTC-Rail Cargo Hungaria	26	23	2	1	853	614	+239	48	Qualification to Champions League group stage
3	DVSC SCHAEFFLER	26	18	3	5	778	633	+145	39	Qualification to Champions League group stage
4	Motherson-Mosonmagyaróvár	26	17	2	7	799	698	+101	36	Qualification to European League group phase
5	Siófok KC	26	13	4	9	731	697	+34	30 (Note: Liquidation proceedings were launched against the club due to unpaid employee wages, as a result of which they were relegated to the third division.)	Relegation to Nemzeti Bajnokság I/B
6	Váci NKSE	26	13	2	11	724	689	+35	28	Qualification to European League third qualifying round
7	Alba Fehérvár KC	26	10	3	13	650	730	−80	23	
8	MTK Budapest	26	9	3	14	702	719	−17	21	
9	Kisvárda Master Good SE	26	10	0	16	597	689	−92	20	
10	Dunaújvárosi Kohász KA	26	8	3	15	643	763	−120	19	
11	Moyra-Budaörs Handball	26	8	3	15	635	728	−93	19	
12	Békéscsabai Előre NKSE	26	7	0	19	644	761	−117	14	
13	Nemzeti Kézilabda Akadémia	26	5	1	20	629	739	−110	11	
14	Érd	26	3	0	23	634	823	−189	6	Relegation to Nemzeti Bajnokság I/B

Source: mksz.hu
Rules for classification: 1) Points; 2) Goal difference; 3) Head-to-head points; 4) Head-to-head goal difference; 5) Goals scored; 6) Matches won; 7) Draw (Note: Head-to-head record is used only after all the matches between the teams in question have been played)

=== Schedule and results ===
In the table below the home teams are listed on the left and the away teams along the top.

Home \ Away	BÉK	BUD	DEB	DUN	ÉRD	ALB	FER	GYŐ	KIS	MOS	MTK	NEK	SIÓ	VÁC
Békéscsabai ENKSE		28–26	20–36	31–27	25–26	23–25	20–33	22–33	17–26	29–24	25–27	26–21	30–32	20–28
Budaörs Handball	25–20		25–23	27–27	32–24	32–26	21–30	13–38	25–27	31–36	20–28	28–21	19–19	24–31
Debreceni VSC	30–22	34–23		40–27	32–24	33–23	26–29	30–31	22–19	30–24	31–24	29–25	21–21	34–33
Dunaújvárosi KKA	30–26	26–22	25–39		30–26	20–22	27–33	14–35	24–26	30–40	25–23	18–18	25–24	34–31
Érd	24–37	27–28	21–32	29–32		20–24	19–41	22–35	21–23	25–39	24–32	28–24	26–33	21–29
Alba Fehérvár KC	25–30	25–20	26–37	26–26	22–20		15–35	21–33	26–22	27–30	26–24	23–28	28–28	24–24
Ferencvárosi TC	42–24	37–20	30–30	31–24	34–26	37–22		32–26	33–22	26–24	38–27	40–20	35–29	42–29
Győri Audi ETO KC	36–24	33–24	25–22	40–24	39–23	35–23	31–20		30–19	30–25	31–25	34–20	33–26	36–25
Kisvárdai KC	28–20	24–25	9–35	28–19	35–25	22–29	18–26	19–32		26–32	32–28	23–15	17–26	25–24
Mosonmagyaróvári KC SE	34–22	30–23	28–28	44–31	35–24	30–27	22–22	21–28	35–27		23–19	41–32	24–28	30–20
MTK Budapest	35–31	28–28	28–29	10–0	32–22	29–30	36–37	28–39	31–20	27–34		28–25	33–32	19–35
Nemzeti Kézilabda Akadémia	26–21	23–26	23–27	29–25	30–31	25–27	16–31	25–33	28–17	26–33	27–26		23–34	28–30
Siófok KC	27–29	37–28	28–26	29–30	31–26	32–29	19–29	26–30	35–23	29–28	32–32	28–25		24–22
Váci NKSE	35–22	26–20	20–22	34–23	37–30	35–29	21–30	17–28	26–20	31–33	23–23	32–26	26–22	

Source: Eredmények
Legend: Blue = home team win; Yellow = draw; Red = away team win.

=== Number of teams by counties ===
Pos.	County (megye)	No. of teams	Team(s)
1	Pest	3	Érd NK, Budaörs and Váci NKSE
2	Budapest (capital)	2	Ferencvárosi TC and MTK Budapest
2	Fejér	2	Alba Fehérvár KC and Dunaújvárosi KKA
2	Győr-Moson-Sopron	2	Győri ETO KC and Mosonmagyaróvári KC SE
2	Somogy	2	Nemzeti Kézilabda Akadémia Balatonboglár and Siófok KC
4	Békés	1	Békéscsabai ENKSE
4	Hajdú-Bihar	1	Debreceni VSC
4	Szabolcs-Szatmár-Bereg	1	Kisvárdai KC

== See also ==
- 2022–23 Győri Audi ETO KC season
- 2022–23 DVSC Schaeffler season
