= Hornak =

Hornak, Horňák, or Horniak (Czech/Slovak feminine: Horňáková, Horniaková) is a Czech and Slovak surname.

== People ==
=== Hornak ===
- Ian Hornak (1944–2002), American draughtsman, painter, and printmaker
- Mark R. Hornak (born 1956), American judge
- Rosemary Hornak (born 1951), American visual artist

=== Horňák, Horňáková ===
- Michal Horňák (born 1970), Czech footballer and manager
- Peter Horňák (born 1964), Slovak water polo player
- Dominika Horňáková (born 1991), Slovak handball player

=== Horniak, Horniaková ===
- Eugen Horniak (1926–2004), Slovak basketball player

== See also ==
- Hornyak
