= Marianna Rebičová =

Slovak handball player (born 1993)

Personal information
- Nationality: Slovak
- Born: 15 August 1993 (age 33) Michalovce, Slovakia
- Height: 1.79 m (5 ft 10 in)

Sport
- Sport: Handball
- Position: Left back
- Current club: MKS Lublin
- Number: 10

Senior clubs
- Years: Team
- 2010-2018: IUVENTA Michalovce
- 2018-2019: Kisvárdai KC
- 2019-2020: RK Krim
- 2020-2022: IUVENTA Michalovce
- 2022-: MKS Lublin
National team
Years	Team	Apps	(Gls)
2010–	Slovakia	51	(40)

Marianna Rebičová (born 15 August 1993) is a Slovak female handball player for MKS Lublin and the Slovak national team.

She represented Slovakia at the 2021 World Women's Handball Championship in Spain.
