= Hornyak =

Hornyak or Hornyák is a surname. Derived from Slovak/Czech Horňák and Ukrainian Горняк, it originally referred to a mountain dweller in Slavic languages. Its counterpart, Dolňák or Dolniak, means "valley dweller".

Notable people with the surname include:

- Ágnes Hornyák (born 1982), Hungarian handball player
- Allan Hornyak (1951–2025), American basketball player
- Augustine Hornyak (1919–2003), Ukrainian Christian religious leader
- Dóra Hornyák (born 1992), Hungarian handball player
- Jennifer Hornyak (born 1940), Canadian artist
- Zsolt Hornyák (born 1973), Slovak footballer
- Kathleen Ann Hornyak (born 1955), American Clinical Psychologist
- Jack Hornyak (born 2005), Sunderland Football Club Player

== See also ==
- Hornak
