= Klaudia Michnová =

Slovak handball player (born 1990)

Personal information
- Nationality: Slovak
- Born: 4 June 1990 (age 36)
- Height: 1.66 m (5 ft 5 in)

Sport
- Sport: Handball
- Position: Centre back
- Current club: HK Slávia Partizánske
National team
Years	Team	Apps	(Gls)
–	Slovakia	24	(44)

Klaudia Michnová (born 4 June 1990) is a Slovak handball player for HK Slávia Partizánske and the Slovak national team.
