= Simona Súlovská =

Slovak handball player (born 1990)

Personal information
- Nationality: Slovak
- Born: 2 September 1990 (age 36)
- Height: 1.70 m (5 ft 7 in)

Sport
- Sport: Handball
- Position: Goalkeeper
- Current club: HK Slávia Partizánske
National team
Years	Team	Apps	(Gls)
–	Slovakia	21	(0)

Simona Súlovská (born 2 September 1990) is a Slovak handball player for HK Slávia Partizánske and the Slovak national team.
