= Kristina Graovac =

Serbian handball player (born 1991)

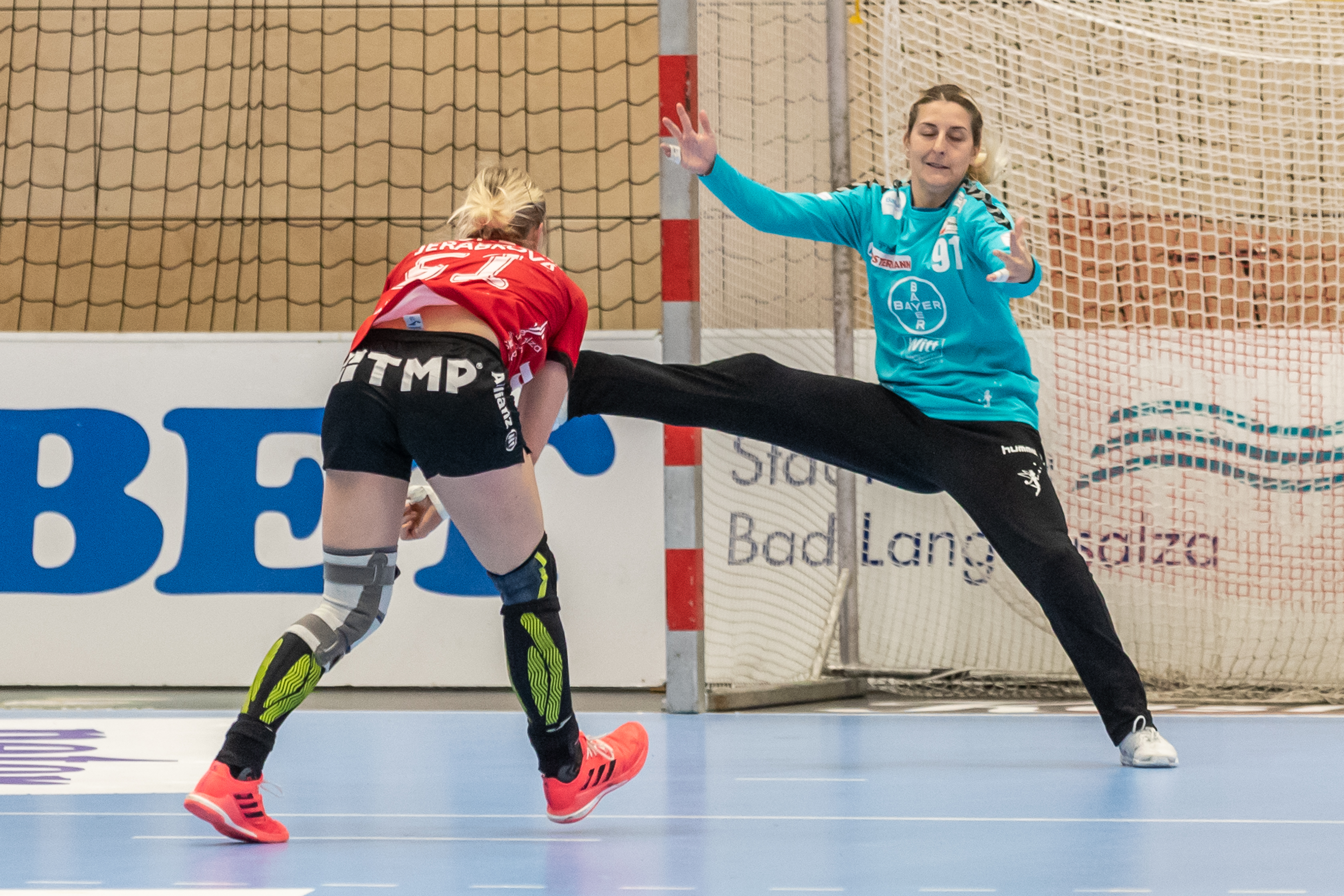

Personal information
- Nationality: Serbian
- Born: August 14, 1991 (age 35) Pirot, Serbia, Yugoslavia
- Height: 1.72 m (5 ft 8 in)

Sport
- Sport: Handball
- Position: Goalkeeper
- Current club: Retired
- Number: 91

Senior clubs
- Years: Team
- –2009: ŽRK Cepelin
- 2009-2010: ŽRK Medicinar Šabac
- 2010-2013: RK Radnicki Kragujevac
- 2013-2015: ŽORK Jagodina
- 2015-2017: Ardeşen GSK
- 2017: CS Rapid București
- 2017-2018: Ardeşen GSK
- 2018-2020: Muratpaşa Belediyesi SK
- 2020-2022: Bayer 04 Leverkusen
- 2022-2023: Kisvárdai KC
National team
Years	Team	Apps	(Gls)
2011–2023	Serbia	33	(3)

Kristina Graovac (Serbian Cyrillic: Кристина Граовац; née Georgijev; born August 14, 1991) is a Serbian female retired handballer. She played in the Serbian national team. The 1.72 m (5 ft 8 in)-tall sportswoman played in the goalkeeper position.

Between 2013 and 2015, she played in her country for ZORK Jagodina. Here she won the Serbian Cup in 2014. before she joined Turkish club Ardeşen GSK in the 2015–16 season.

She played at the 2015–16 Women's EHF Cup Winners' Cup for Ardeşen GSK.

In 2017 she joined CS Rapid București, but after only three matches she was released of her contract by her recommendation and returned to Ardeşen GSK. In 2018 she joined league rivals Muratpaşa Belediyesi SK. A year later she won the Turkish cup with the club.

In 2020 she had a transfer to a Danish club planned, but it was canceled due to the COVID-19 pandemic. Instead she joined German club Bayer 04 Leverkusen.

In 2022 she joined Hungarian Kisvárdai KC. She retired after the 2022/23 season.

== Private life ==
Her sister Tamara Radojević is also handball player.
