= Tamara Radojević =

Serbian handball player (born 1992)

Personal information
- Nationality: Serbian
- Born: 6 September 1992 (age 34) Pirot, Serbia
- Height: 1.72 m (5 ft 8 in)

Sport
- Sport: Handball
- Position: Centre back
- Current club: Kisvárdai KC
- Number: 20
National team
Years	Team	Apps	(Gls)
2015–2023	Serbia	56	(104)
Medal record
Mediterranean Games
Gold medal – first place	2013 Mersin	Team
Summer Universiade
Bronze medal – third place	2015 Gwangju	Team

Tamara Radojević (née Georgijev) (born Serbian: Тамара Георгијев; 6 September 1992) is a Serbian handball player for Kisvárdai KC and previously the Serbian national team.

She competed at the 2015 World Women's Handball Championship in Denmark.

Her sister is Kristina Graovac handball player.
