= Andrea Kertészová =

Slovak handball player (born 1988)

Personal information
- Nationality: Slovak
- Born: 4 November 1988 (age 37)
- Height: 1.77 m (5 ft 10 in)

Sport
- Sport: Handball
- Position: Left back
- Current club: HK Slovan Duslo Šaľa
National team
Years	Team	Apps	(Gls)
–	Slovakia	14	(24)

Andrea Kertészová (born 4 November 1988) is a Slovak handball player for HK Slovan Duslo Šaľa and the Slovak national team.
