= Erin Novak =

Slovenian handball player (born 1994)

Personal information
- Nationality: Slovenian
- Born: 7 June 2002 (age 24) Novo mesto, Slovenia
- Height: 1.76 m (5 ft 9 in)

Sport
- Sport: Handball
- Position: Centre back
- Current club: Kisvárdai KC
- Number: 10

Senior clubs
- Years: Team
- 2020–2022: ŽRK Krka
- 2022–2023: ŽRK Z'dežele
- 2023–: Kisvárdai KC
National team
Years	Team	Apps	(Gls)
2020–	Slovenia	44	(36)
- Updated on 11 November 2026

Erin Novak (born 7 June 2002) is a Slovenian handballer for Kisvárdai KC and the Slovenian national team.

She participated at the 2024 European Women's Handball Championship in Hungary, Switzerland and Austria.
