= Lucia Gubiková =

Slovak handball player (born 1993)

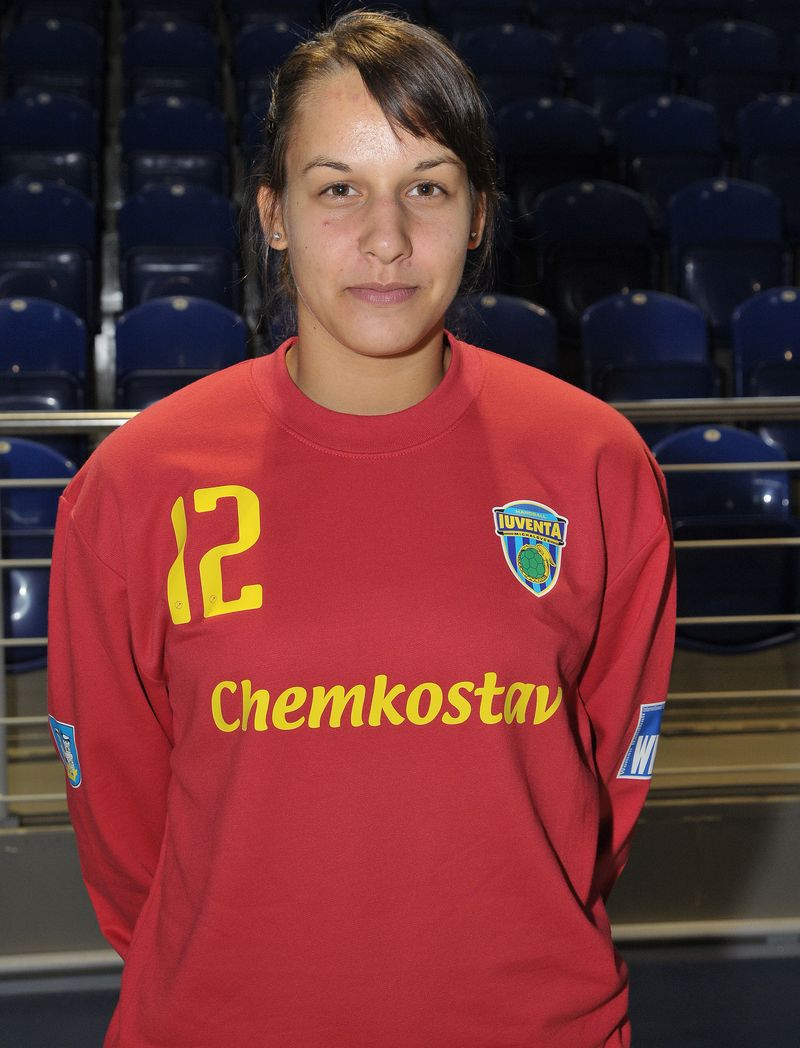

Personal information
- Nationality: Slovak
- Born: 11 February 1993 (age 33) Michalovce, Slovakia
- Height: 1.79 m (5 ft 10 in)

Sport
- Sport: Handball
- Position: Goalkeeper
- Current club: Mosonmagyaróvári KC SE
- Number: 12
National team
Years	Team	Apps	(Gls)
–	Slovakia	28	(0)

Lucia Gubiková (born 11 February 1993) was a Slovak handball player for Mosonmagyaróvári KC SE and the Slovak national team. She previously played for IUVENTA Michalovce.
