= Ekaterina Dzhukeva =

Bulgarian handball player

Personal information
- Full name: Ekaterina Dzhukeva
- Nationality: Bulgarian
- Born: 8 May 1988 (age 38) Dupnitsa, Bulgaria
- Height: 1.85 m (6 ft 1 in)

Sport
- Sport: Handball
- Position: Goalkeeper
- Current club: CSM Slatina
- Number: 1

Senior clubs
- Years: Team
- 2005-2006: (Bulgaria) Buki Gabrovo
- 2006-2007: (Iceland) ÍBV
- 2007-2008: (Iceland) HK Kópavogs
- 2008-2011: (Spain) AD Sagardía
- 2012-2013: (Norway) Fredrikstad BK
- 2013-2016: (Poland) MKS Selgros Lublin
- 2016-2018: (Hungary) Kisvárdai KC
- 2018-2022: (Romania) SCM Craiova
- 2022-2024: (Romania) CSM Târgu Jiu
- 2024-: (Romania) CSM Slatina
National team
- Years: Team
- –: Bulgaria

Ekaterina Dzhukeva (Bulgarian: Екатерина Джукева) (born 8 May 1988) is a Bulgarian handballer who plays as a goalkeeper for Liga Națională club CSM Slatina and the Bulgaria national team.

== Achievements ==
- Ekstraklasa:
  - Winner: 2014, 2015, 2016
