= Andrea Czanik =

Slovak handball player (born 1979)

Personal information
- Nationality: Slovak
- Born: 29 October 1979 (age 46)
- Height: 1.77 m (5 ft 10 in)

Sport
- Sport: Handball
- Position: Pivot
- Current club: HSG Wittlich
National team
Years	Team	Apps	(Gls)
–	Slovakia	13	(15)

Andrea Czanik (born 29 October 1979) is a handball player for DJK/MJC Trier and the Slovak national team. Her nationality is Slovakia.
