= Katarína Dubajová =

Slovak handball player (born 1978)

Personal information
- Nationality: Slovak
- Born: 9 December 1978 (age 47)
- Height: 1.79 m (5 ft 10 in)

Sport
- Sport: Handball
- Position: Right back
- Current club: Retired

Senior clubs
- Years: Team
- –2001: HK Slovan Duslo Šaľa
- 2001–2003: VfL Oldenburg
- 2003–2005: HK Slovan Duslo Šaľa
- 2005–2006: Frederikshavn FOX Team Nord
- 2006–2009: Horsens HK
- 2009–2009: HK Slovan Duslo Šaľa
- 2011–2011: HK Slovan Duslo Šaľa
- 2011–2012: DHC Sokol Poruba
- 2013–2013: ŠKP Piccard Senec
- 2013–2015: MKS Olimpia/Beskid Nowy Sącz
- 2015–2017: HBC Bascharage
- 2017–: HK Slávia Sereď
National team
Years	Team	Apps	(Gls)
1996-2015	Slovakia	217	(835)

Katarína Dubajová (born 9 December 1978) is a former Slovak handball player. She recently played for MKS Olimpia/Beskid Nowy Sącz and the Slovak national team, but is now retired.
