= Žaneta Tóthová =

Slovak handball player (born 1984)

Personal information
- Nationality: Slovak
- Born: 6 August 1984 (age 42) Štúrovo, Czechoslovakia
- Height: 1.80 m (5 ft 11 in)

Sport
- Sport: Handball
- Position: Goalkeeper
- Current club: Stella St-Maur Handball

Senior clubs
- Years: Team
- –: TJ Juhcelpap Štúrovo
- –: HC SCP Banská Bystrica
- 2005-2008: Vasas SC
- 2008-2010: Békéscsabai Előre NKSE
- 2011-2013: Cercle Dijon Bourgogne
- 2013-2016: Stella St-Maur Handball
National team
Years	Team	Apps	(Gls)
–	Slovakia	71	(3)

Žaneta Tóthová (born 6 August 1984) is a Slovak former handball player for Stella St-Maur Handball and the Slovak national team.
