= Dušan Poloz =

Slovak handball coach (born 1965)

Personal information
- Nationality: Czech
- Born: 9 May 1965 (age 61) Zlín, Czech Republic

Sport
- Sport: Handball

Teams managed
- Years: Team
- 1992-1996: Bystřice pod Hostýnem
- 1996-1998: Novesta Zlín (assistent)
- –: SK Njård
- 2005-2008: Follo HK (youth)
- 2011-2012: HC Zlin
- 2012-2013: Czech Republic women (assistent)
- 2013-2016: Slovak women

Dušan Poloz (born 9 May 1965) is a Slovak handball coach. From 2013 to 2016 he was the head coach for the Slovak women's national team. At the 2014 European Women's Handball Championship he qualified Slovakia for their first major international tournament in 18 years.
