= Dolniak =

Dolniak is a surname. Its origin is Slavic, meaning "valley dweller." Its counterpart, Hornyak, means "mountain dweller". Notable people with the surname include:

- Barbara Dolniak (born 1960), Polish politician, wife of Grzegorz
- Grzegorz Dolniak (1960–2010), Polish politician
