= Bianca Tiron =

Romanian handballer (born 1995)

Personal information
- Full name: Bianca Elena Harabagiu
- Nationality: Romanian
- Born: 31 May 1995 (age 31) Iași, Romania
- Height: 1.81 m (5 ft 11 in)

Sport
- Sport: Handball
- Position: Left Back
- Current club: Corona Brașov

Youth career
- Years: Team
- –2013: LPS Iași

Senior clubs
- Years: Team
- 2013–2014: Neptun Constanţa
- 2014–2015: HCM Baia Mare
- 2015: → SCM Craiova (loan)
- 2015-2017: Dunărea Brăila
- 2017-2019: Corona Brașov
- 2019- 2021: Dunărea Brăila
- 2021-: Gloria Buzău
National team
Years	Team	Apps	(Gls)
–	Romania	4	(5)
- Updated on 1 November 2017

Bianca Elena Harabagiu (née: Tiron; born 31 May 1995 in Iași) is a Romanian handballer who plays for Gloria Buzău.
