= Dominika Horňáková =

Slovak handball player (born 1991)

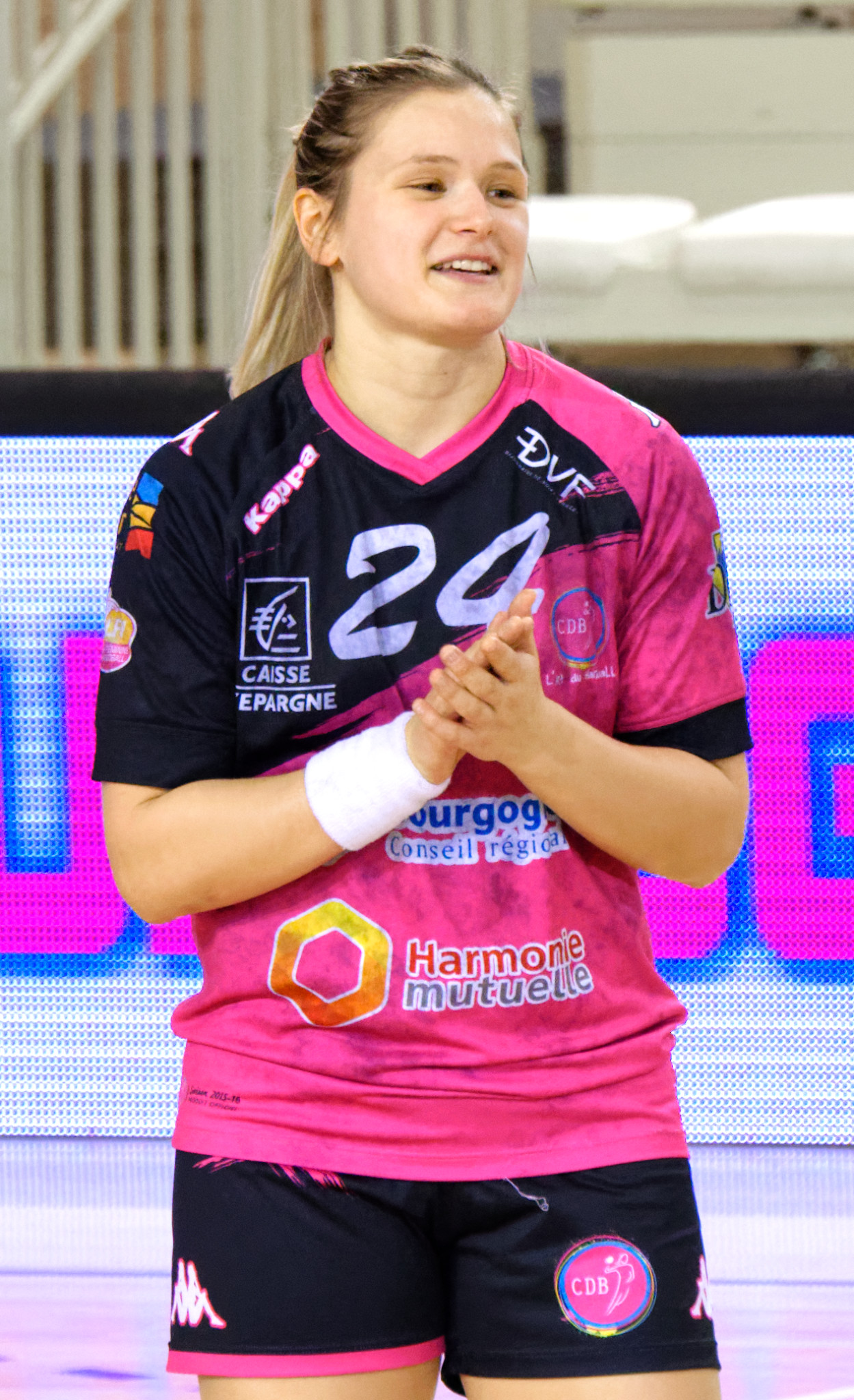
- Dominika Horňáková in 2016.

Personal information
- Nationality: Slovak
- Born: 1 February 1991 (age 35) Michalovce, Czechoslovakia
- Height: 1.74 m (5 ft 9 in)

Sport
- Sport: Handball
- Position: Pivot
- Current club: IUVENTA Michalovce
- Number: 17

Senior clubs
- Years: Team
- -2015: IUVENTA Michalovce
- 2015-2016: Cercle Dijon Bourgogne
National team
Years	Team	Apps	(Gls)
–	Slovakia	16	(21)

Dominika Horňáková (born 1 February 1991) is a Slovak former handball player, who played for the Slovak national team.
