= Jorge Dueñas =

Spanish handball player and coach (born 1962)

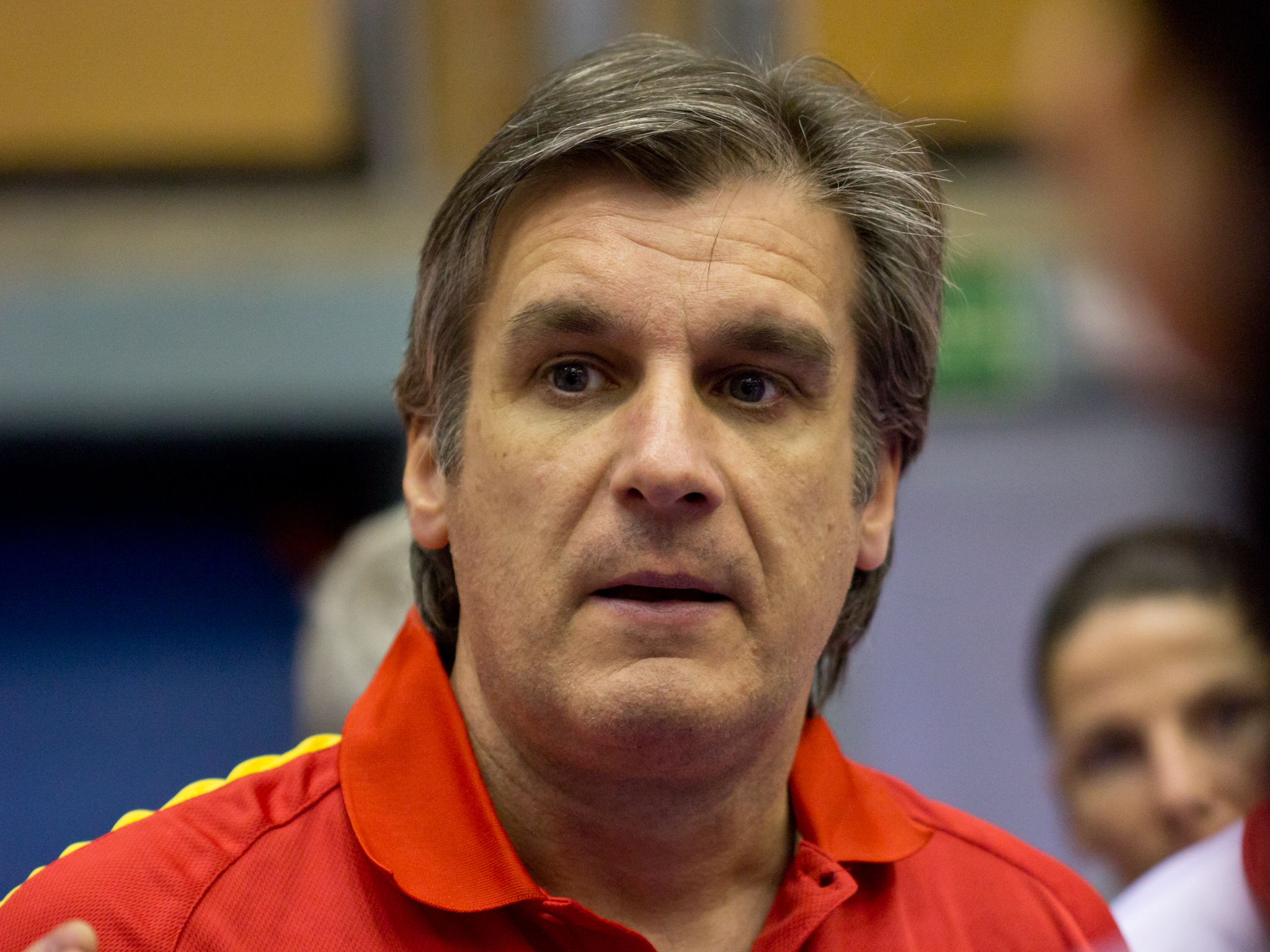

Personal information
- Full name: Jorge Dueñas de Galarza
- Nationality: Spanish
- Born: 16 October 1962 (age 64) Bilbao, Spain

Sport
- Sport: Handball
- Position: Goalkeeper
- Current club: Slovakia (w)

Senior clubs
- Years: Team
- –: ACD Michelin
- –: CD Cajamadrid
- –: CD Naranco
- –: Villa de Avilés
- –: Iberduero

Teams managed
- 1995–1996: Iberduero
- 1996–1998: JD Arrate (w)
- 1998–1999: BM Bera Bera
- 1999–2005: JD Arrate
- 2005–2007: BM Zuazo
- 2007–2017: Spain (w)
- 2017–2021: Brazil (w)
- 2022–: Slovakia (w)

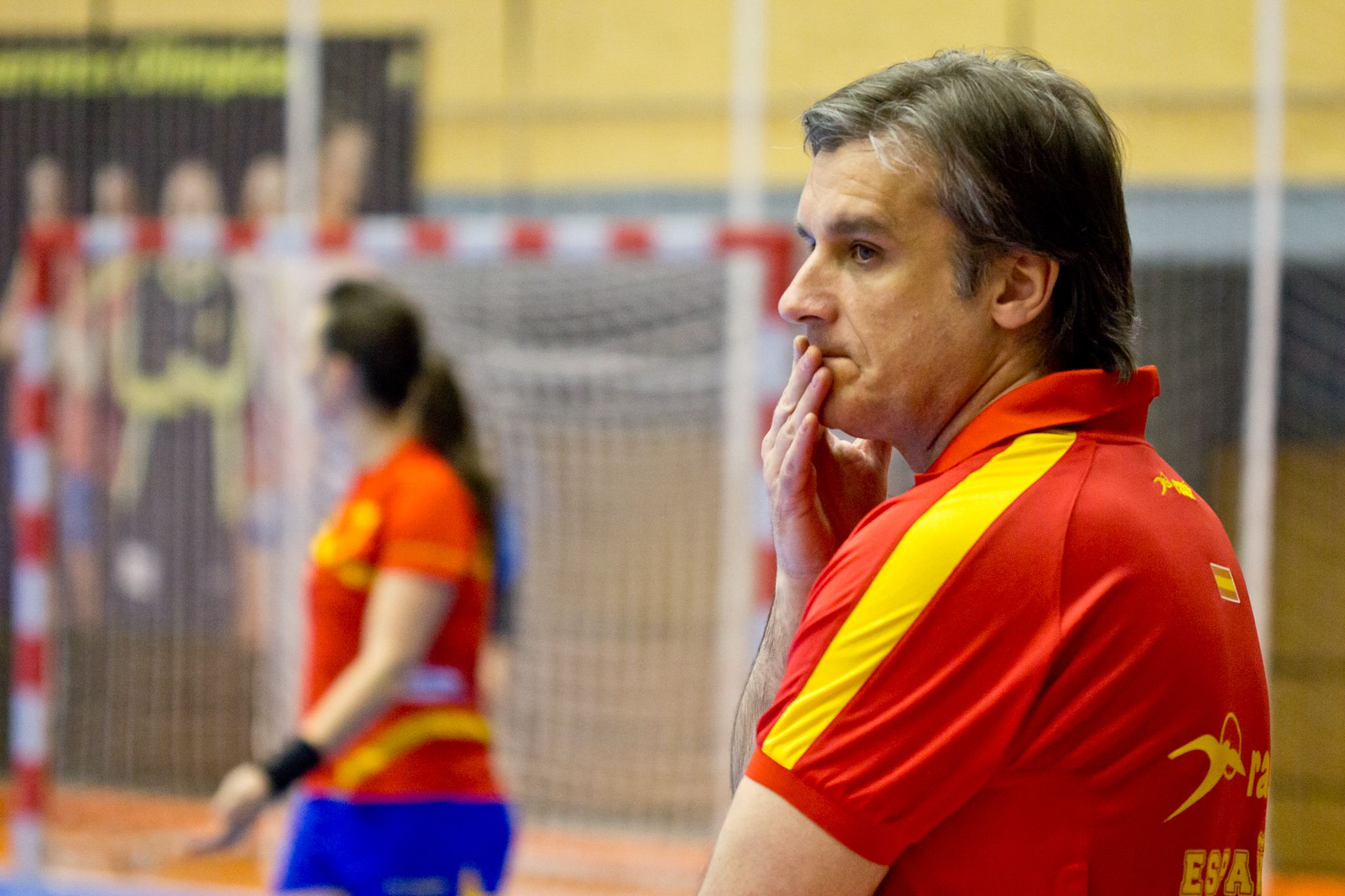
Jorge Dueñas during a game with the Spain women's national handball team in 2013.

Jorge Dueñas de Galarza (born 16 October 1962) is a former Spanish handball player and current coach of the Brazilian national handball team. Dueñas led the Spanish team to silver medals at the 2008 European Women's Handball Championship, when Spain defeated Germany 32–29 in the semifinal, and lost 21–34 against Norway in the final.

He coached the Spanish team at the 2011 World Women's Handball Championship in Brazil, where the Spanish team placed third.

On 14 January 2018, he was appointed as a member of the Commission of Coaching and Methods of International Handball Federation by the IHF Council in its meeting held in Zagreb (Croatia) on the fringes of the 2018 European Men's Handball Championship.
