= Kisvárdai KC =

Kisvárda KC
- Full name: Kisvárdai Kézilabda Club
- Nickname: Várda
- Short name: Kisvárda
- Founded: 2007
- Arena: Városi Sportcsarnok Kisvárda, Kisvárda
- Capacity: 1,000
- President: Tamás Major
- League: Nemzeti Bajnokság I
- 2021–22: Nemzeti Bajnokság I, 7th
- Club colours
Home	Away

Kisvárdai KC is a Hungarian handball club from Kisvárda. Since the season 2017/18 it plays in the Nemzeti Bajnokság I.

Location of Kisvárdai KC

== Kits ==
HOME
2017–18	2018–19	2019–21	2021–23

AWAY
2016–17	2017–18	2018–19	2019–20	2020–

THIRD
2017–18	2018–19

== Team ==
=== Current squad ===
Squad for the 2026–27 season

- Head coach: Dévényi János
- Assistant coach: Valéria Szabó
- Goalkeeping coach: Levente Nagy
- Fittness coach: Szandra Baricza-Maurer
- Doctor: Jenő Kósa, MD
- Chairman: Tamás Major
- Technical manager: Flóra Csendes-Major

Goalkeepers

- 12 (Hungary) Bettina Pásztor
- 91 (Hungary) Dalma Christe
- 61 (Hungary) Ivett Orosz

Left wingers

- 8 (Hungary) Maja Mérai
- 55 (Hungary) Fanni Török

Right wingers

- 34 (Hungary) Léna Gém
- 97 (Hungary) Szonja Szemes

Line players

- 29 (Slovakia) Viktória Győri
- 51 (Hungary) Panni Kostyó

Back players
LB

- 20 (Hungary) Kitti Gyimesi
- 71 (Hungary) Dorottya Kulcsár
- 18 (Hungary) Petra Koronczai
- 15 (Hungary) Petra Czenki

CB

- 36 (Hungary) Zsófia Mlinkó
- 11 (Slovakia) Dorota Bacenková
- 7 (Romania) Sarah Kibédi

RB

=== Transfers ===
Transfers for the 2026–27 season

Joining

- (Hungary) Zsófia Mlinkó (CB) from (Hungary) Esztergomi KC
- (Hungary) Petra Koronczai (LB) from (Hungary) National Academy of Handball
- (Hungary) Szonja Szemes (RW) from (Hungary) Szombathelyi KKA
- (Slovakia) Dorota Bacenková (CB) (Slovakia) IUVENTA Michalovce

Leaving

- (Hungary) Lilla Szász (GK)
- (Hungary) Lilla Csáki (RW)
- (Hungary) Kamilla Karé (LW)
- (Hungary) Alexandra Agócs to (Hungary) Esztergomi KC
- (Hungary) Szabina Karnik (RB) (retires)
- (Hungary) Luca Poczetnyik (LB) to (Hungary) Váci NKSE
- (Croatia) Larissa Kalaus (LB) (retires)
- (Montenegro) Nikolina Milojkovic (LB)
- (Ukraine) Kateryna Sadovnycha (LB)
- (Ukraine) Liubov Rosokha (CB)
- (Slovenia) Erin Novak (CB)

=== Notable former players ===
==== Goalkeepers ====
- (Hungary) Bettina Pásztor
- (Hungary) Ágnes Triffa
- (Hungary) Mária Barkasziné Szász
- (Hungary) (Ukraine) Erzsébet Birta
- (Hungary) Katalin Rakovszky
- (Bulgaria) Ekaterina Dzhukeva
- (Russia) Darina Shulega
- (Poland) Weronika Kordowiecka
- (Serbia) Kristina Graovac

==== Right wings ====
- (Hungary) Adrienn Orbán
- (Hungary) Flóra Katona
- (Hungary) Krisztina Nagy
- (Hungary) Beáta Kulcsár
- (Croatia) Lea Vukojevic
- (Ukraine) Ivanna Myhovych
- (Japan) Natsumi Akiyama

==== Right backs ====
- (Serbia) Marina Dmitrović
- (Serbia) Ana Tomkovic
- (Montenegro) Andrea Klikovac
- (Romania) Ana Maria Dragut
- (Romania) Mihaela Galai
- (Romania) Aneta Mocut
- (Slovakia) Veronika Habánková
- (Hungary) Ágnes Hornyák

==== Line players ====
- (Hungary) Valéria Szabó
- (Hungary) Luca Dombi
- (Hungary) Éva Agárdi
- (Hungary) Csilla Csirinyi
- (Ukraine) (Hungary) Julia Ignatenko
- (Croatia) Vesna Milanović-Litre
- (Romania) Elena Rigmányi
- (Brazil) Tamires Morena
- (Norway) Hanna Yttereng
- (Ukraine) Nataliya Savchyn
- (Slovakia) Nikoleta Trúnková
- (North Macedonia) Ivana Djatevska
- (Montenegro) Andrea Brajovic

==== Central backs ====
- (Hungary) Gabriella Vass
- (Serbia) Kristina Liščević
- (Serbia) Tamara Radojević
- (Angola) Isabel Guialo
- (Slovakia) Yuliya Kucerová
- (Ukraine) Viktoria Tsybulenko
- (Ukraine) Liubov Rosokha
- (Slovenia) Erin Novak
- (Romania) Karin Stoian
- (Japan) Ayano Mihara

==== Left backs ====
- (Hungary) Krisztina Triscsuk
- (Hungary) Adrienne Gábor
- (Hungary) Beatrix Prok
- (Hungary) Corina Csuk
- (Hungary) Renáta Kévés
- (Hungary) Gréta Juhász
- (Hungary) Pálma Siska
- (Russia) Maria Khakunova
- (Russia) Alena Ikhneva
- (Ukraine) Olena Umanets
- (Ukraine) Fatima Ovtus
- (Lithuania) Marija Gedroit
- (Slovakia) Marianna Rebičová
- (Slovakia) Simona Szarková
- (Croatia) Tena Petika
- (Croatia) Larissa Kalaus
- (Romania) Carmen Ana Buceschi
- (Slovenia) Erin Novak

==== Left wings ====
- (Hungary) Ivett Nagy
- (Hungary) Bernadett Baunok
- (Hungary) Olívia Buglyó
- (Serbia) Aleksandra Stamenić
- (Russia) Yelena Avdekova
- (Croatia) Aneta Benko
- (Brazil) Samira Rocha

== Coaches ==
- (Hungary) Tibor Zupkó (between 1992–1993)
- (Hungary) György Simák (between 1992–1993)
- (Hungary) Mária Berzsenyi (1993–1995)
- (Hungary) Tibor Oláh (between 1995–1996)
- (Hungary) Balázs Benyáts (between 1995–1996)
- (Hungary) János Babán (1996–1997)
- (Hungary) János Palkó (1997–1999)
- (Hungary) Béla Kerezsi (1999)
- (Hungary) Péter Kovács (2016)
- (Hungary) Eszter Mátéfi (2016–2018)
- (Hungary) János Dévényi (2018, 2019, 2026–present)
- (Montenegro) Vlatko Đonović (2018–2019)
- (Hungary) Botond Bakó (2019–2023)
- (Hungary) Valéria Bányász-Szabó (2023)
- (Hungary) Krisztián Józsa (2023–2026)
