= Oana Bondar =

Romanian handballer (born 1983)

Personal information
- Full name: Oana Carmina Bondar
- Nationality: Romanian
- Born: 26 March 1983 (age 43) Cluj-Napoca, Romania
- Height: 1.78 m (5 ft 10 in)

Sport
- Sport: Handball
- Position: Centre back
- Current club: CS Minaur Baia Mare

Youth career
- Years: Team
- 1997–2001: CSȘ Viitorul Cluj-Napoca

Senior clubs
- Years: Team
- 2001–2002: U Jolidon Cluj Napoca
- 2002–2009: HCM Baia Mare
- 2009–2010: CS Știința Bacău
- 2011–2012: U Jolidon Cluj Napoca
- 2012–2014: HCM Baia Mare
- 2014–2017: ASC Corona Brașov
- 2017–: CS Minaur Baia Mare
National team
Years	Team	Apps	(Gls)
2014–	Romania	0	(0)

Oana Bondar (née Herman, born 26 March 1983) is a Romanian female handballer who plays for CS Minaur Baia Mare.

== Achievements ==
- Liga Naţională:
  - Winner: 2014
  - Silver Medalist: 2013
- Cupa României:
  - Winner: 2013, 2014
- Supercupa României:
  - Winner: 2013

== Personal life ==
Oana Bondar is married to former Romanian handballer Alin Bondar.
