= Jennifer Hornyak =

Canadian artist (born 1940)

- Notable work: Painting & printmaking
- Website: jenniferhornyak.com

Jennifer Hornyak (born 1940) is a Canadian artist known for her semi-figurative style. Early in her career her scenes of Montreal personalities were exhibited at the 1987 Paris World Exhibition. She is now recognized for her colourful and textured graphic still lifes.

== Life and career ==
Jennifer Hornyak (Jennifer Lynne Hampton) was born in Grimsby, England. From 1956 to 1959, she attended the Grimsby School of Art. In 1961 she immigrated to Montreal, Quebec, Canada. She continued her art studies at McGill University, the Montreal Museum of Fine Arts, and at the Saidye Bronfman Centre where she first exhibited her paintings of Montreal scenes and personalities. Hornyak's first solo exhibitions were held in 1984 and 1985 at Galerie Claude Lafitte (Montreal). Praised by art reviewer André Martin for her gift of "anecdote", Hornyak then participated in a group show at Place des Arts (Montreal) and held a solo exhibition at Nancy Poole's Studio (Toronto).

In 1987, Hornyak was the sole Canadian to participate at the Paris World Exhibition at the invitation of her patron, Baroness Marie-Hélène de Rothschild. Exhibiting her paintings alongside those by Pablo Picasso, Amedeo Modigliani, and Kees van Dongen, increased recognition led to her participation in Feminissima at Galerie Artcurial (Paris) as the sole Canadian among artists from 35 countries, and at the Palais des Expositions (Nice). The following year she exhibited at Donna Heuhhoff Gallery (Dallas), at Sandra Werther Fine Art (New York) in 1989, and held a solo show at Eleonore Austerer Gallery, San Francisco in 1991. Throughout this period, she honed her technique at the Vermont Studio Colony with Stanley Boxer, George McLean and Elmer Bischoff and with Elizabeth Lyons in Tuscany, Italy.

By 1991, Hornyak's work had been reviewed in the prestigious journals ARTnews, Art Auction, Art in America, Beaux-Arts (France) and Mizue (China), but continued to evolve. Increasingly introspective, in 1994 art reviewer Bernard Théoret noted that her "'appeal to the unconscious was impressionistic like an invitation to the garden of the soul". Flowers soon became her symbol of "universality" and dominant subject. Influenced by the graphic still lifes of Giorgio Morandi, her signature style, of "semi-figurative, almost abstract, works... built up through a complex technique of richly coloured glazes", was evident by 2003.

Since 2003 Hornyak has held over ten solo exhibitions in cities such as Ottawa and Halifax. A participant in many group shows, her paintings are exhibited alongside work by Jim Dine, Chuck Close, and Tom Hopkins in Montreal, and at Miami Art Basel, the Chicago Contemporary and Classic, and Toronto International Art Fair. In 2013, Hornyak exhibited across Canada at Wallace Galleries (Calgary), Trias Gallery (Toronto), Oeno Gallery (Prince Edward County), Galerie St-Laurent + Hill (Ottawa), Galerie de Bellefeuille (Montreal), Studio 21 (Halifax) and Trinity Gallery (Saint John). In April 2015 her first solo exhibition of figurative works in over twenty-years, The Figure Revisited at the Visual Arts Centre (Montreal), was included in the "Must-Sees" column in Canadian Art.

Hornyak has served on juries for the 2013 Women’s Art Society (Montreal), the 2011 OKWA Festival (Kingston, Ontario), and the 1991 American Women’s Art Show (Montreal). She has also held workshops in Eastern Canada at the Creativity Art Retreat (Dunedin, Ontario), at the Alelucia, L’Ecole d’Arts de l’Estrie (Magog, Quebec) and, at the Elephant Barn (Georgeville, Quebec).

Hornyak's work can be found in many private and corporate corporations, including: Bell Canada Enterprises, Bombardier Transport, Burroughs Welcome Inc., Imperial Oil, Dupont Canada, Hoechst Canada Inc., Power Corporation, Groupe La Laurentienne, Groupe SNC Lavalin, Hyatt Regency Hotel, Westin Hotels, La Presse, and the MacNaughton Collection.

Hornyak works and lives in Montreal, Quebec, Canada.

== Career highlights ==
- 2009 Selected to exhibit at the International Print Triennial, Kraków (Poland)
- 1992 Painting featured on the book cover of "Three by Three" by Anne Dandurand
- 1990 Painting on cover: 50th Year Celebration of Quebec House for Quebec Delegation Office, Rockefeller Plaza, New York.
- 1990 Presentation at the Montreal Museum of Fine Arts for the Women’s Art Society
- 1989 Montreal Museum of Fine Arts, Group Exhibition
- 1989 Record cover for le Nouvel Ensemble Moderne (NEM)
- 1988 Mural for Our Lady of Hungary Church, Montreal
- 1987 The sole Canadian exhibitor at the 1987 Paris World Exposition
- 1984 Group Exhibition Place des Arts, Montreal

Select Solo Exhibitions

- 2013 Wallace Galleries, Calgary
- 2011 Galerie de Bellefeuille, Montreal
- 2011 Galerie St-Laurent + Hill, Ottawa
- 2010 Trinity Galleries, Saint John
- 2006 Wallace Galleries, Calgary
- 2004 Studio 21, Halifax
- 1994 Galerie de Bellefeuille, Montreal
- 1991 Eleonore Austerer Gallery, San Francisco.
- 1987 Nancy Poole Studio, Toronto
- 1983 Galerie Claude Lafitte, Montreal
