= Eva Minárčiková =

Slovak handball player (born 1992)

Personal information
- Nationality: Slovak
- Born: 3 July 1992 (age 34) Žilina, Czechoslovakia
- Height: 1.73 m (5 ft 8 in)

Sport
- Sport: Handball
- Position: Pivot
- Current club: DHC Sokol Poruba
- Number: 17
National team
Years	Team	Apps	(Gls)
–	Slovakia	7	(1)

Eva Minárčiková (born 3 July 1992) is a Slovak handball player for DHC Sokol Poruba and the Slovak national team.
