= Izabela Prudzienica =

Polish handball player (born 1985)

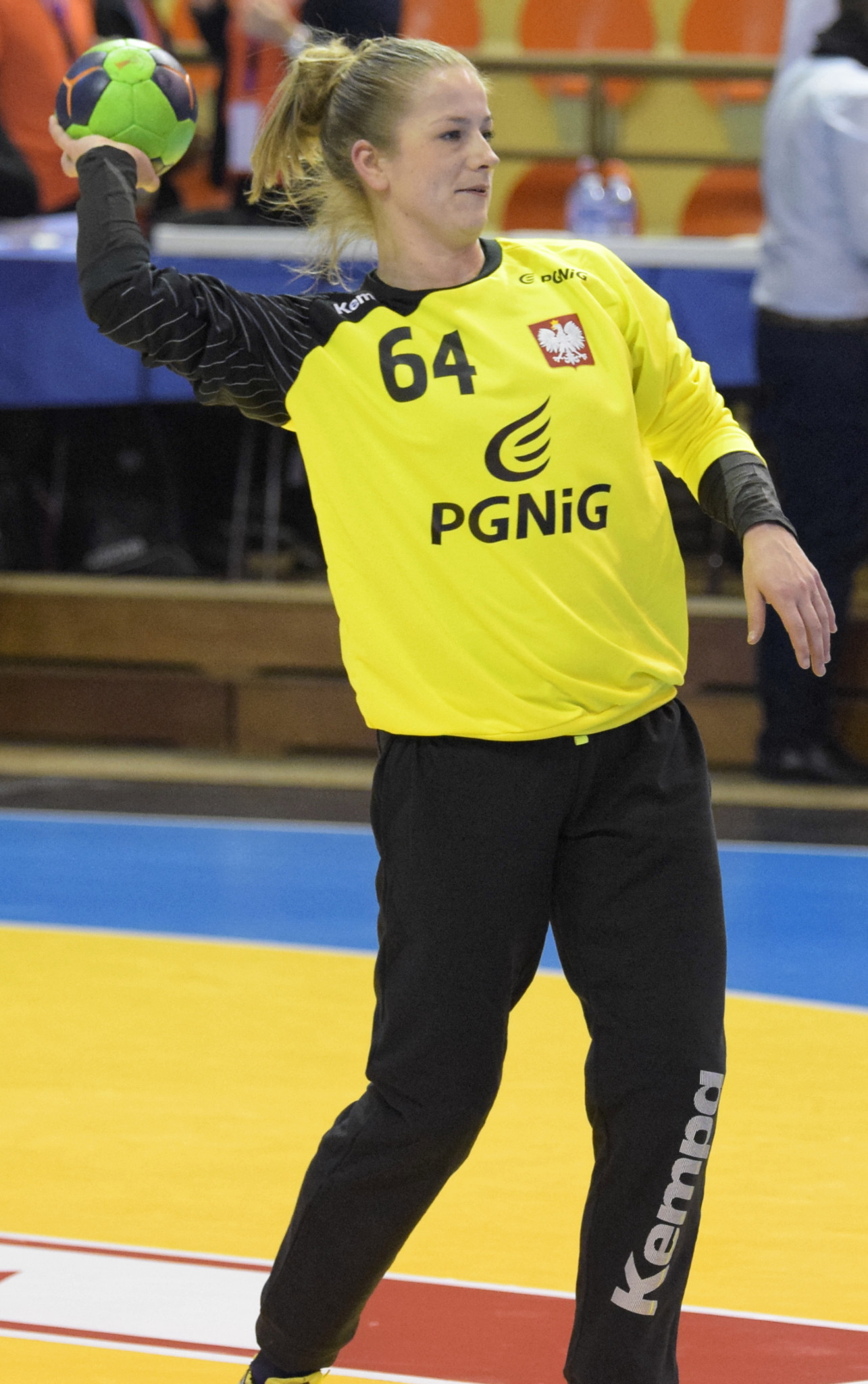

Personal information
- Nationality: Polish
- Born: 27 May 1985 (age 41) Jelenia Góra, Poland
- Height: 1.79 m (5 ft 10 in)

Sport
- Sport: Handball
- Position: Gopalkeeper
- Current club: Energa AZS Koszalin
- Number: 64
National team
Years	Team	Apps	(Gls)
–	Poland	27	(0)

Izabela Prudzienica (born 27 May 1985) is a Polish handball player for Energa AZS Koszalin and the Polish national team.
