= Valéria Szabó =

Hungarian handball player (born 1983)

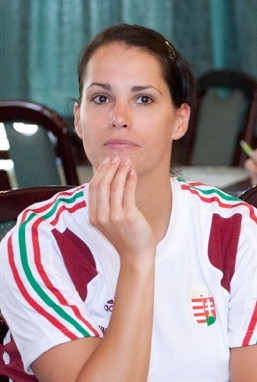
- Valéria Szabó in 2011

Personal information
- Nationality: Hungarian
- Born: 2 March 1983 (age 43) Budapest, Hungary
- Height: 181 cm (71 in)

Sport
- Sport: Handball
- Position: Line player
- Current club: Retired

Senior clubs
- Years: Team
- 1999–2002: Debreceni VSC
- loan: → Hajdúnánás SC
- 2002–2004: Hódmezővásárhelyi NK
- loan: → Szeged KKSE
- 2004–2006: Alba Fehérvár KC
- 2006–2011: Debreceni VSC
- 2011–2013: Zvezda Zvenigorod
- 2013–2016: Békéscsabai ENKSE
- 2016–2018: Kisvárdai KC
National team
Years	Team	Apps	(Gls)
2008–2012	Hungary	63	(78)

Teams managed
- ?-: Kisvárdai KC (Ass. Coach)
Medal record
European Championship
Bronze medal – third place	2012 Serbia	Team
Junior World Championship
Silver medal – second place	2003 Macedonia	Team
- Updated on 8 December 2012

Valéria Bányász-Szabó (born 2 March 1983 in Debrecen) is a former Hungarian handballer who most recently played for Kisvárdai KC and for the Hungarian national team.

She made her international debut on 14 October 2008 against France. She represented Hungary on the World Championship in 2009 and on the European Championship in 2010.

She retired from professional handball in 2018.

== Achievements ==
- Nemzeti Bajnokság I:
  - Silver Medallist: 2010, 2011
  - Bronze Medallist: 2009
- Magyar Kupa:
  - Silver Medallist: 2009, 2011
- EHF Cup:
  - Winner: 2005
- Junior World Championship:
  - Silver Medallist: 2003
- European Championship:
  - Bronze Medalist: 2012
