= Dijana Radojević =

Serbian handball player (born 1990)

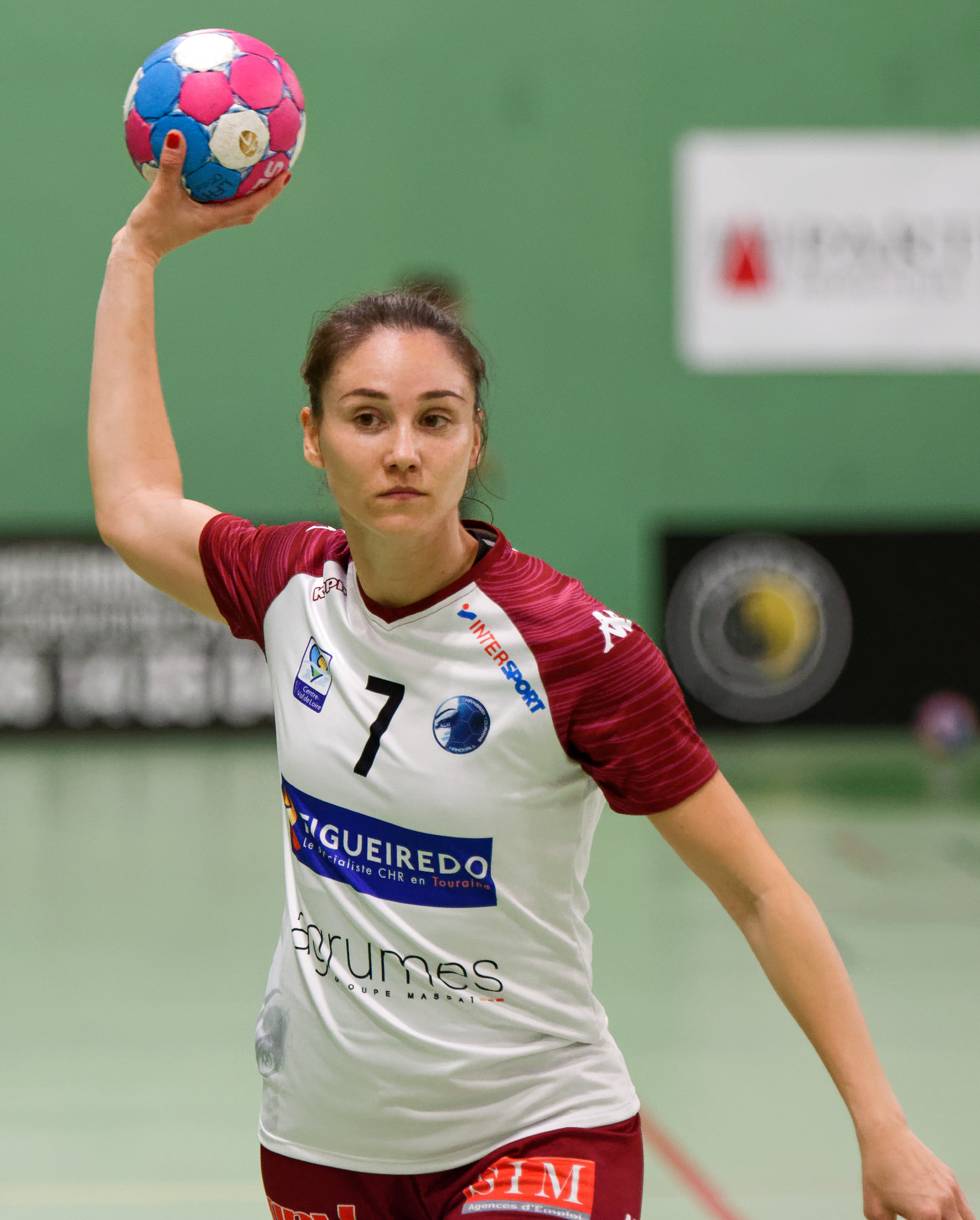
- Dijana Radojević in 2018

Personal information
- Nationality: Serbian
- Born: 2 April 1990 (age 36) Jagodina, SR Serbia, SFR Yugoslavia
- Height: 1.68 m (5 ft 6 in)

Sport
- Sport: Handball
- Position: Left wing
- Current club: CS Măgura Cisnădie
- Number: 21

Senior clubs
- Years: Team
- –2016: ŽORK Jagodina
- 2016–2017: Selfoss
- 2017–2018: Yenimahalle Bld.SK
- 2018–2019: Chambray Touraine Handball
- 2019–2020: Mérignac Handball
- 2020–: CS Măgura Cisnădie
National team
Years	Team	Apps	(Gls)
2014–	Serbia	64	(79)
Medal record
Universiade
Bronze medal – third place	2015 Gwangju	Team

Dijana Radojević (born 2 April 1990) is a Serbian handball player for CS Măgura Cisnădie and the Serbian national team.

== Achievements ==
- Serbian Cup :
  - Winner: 2014
  - The best player of the tournament Serbian Cup 2014
- Women's Regional Handball League :
  - Final Four (3rd place): 2012
