= Petra Tichá-Adámková =

Czech handball player

Personal information
- Nationality: Czech
- Born: 21 June 1991 (age 35) Ostrava, Czechoslovakia
- Height: 1.70 m (5 ft 7 in)

Sport
- Sport: Handball
- Position: Pivot
- Current club: DHC Sokol Poruba
- Number: 67

Senior clubs
- Years: Team
- –2015: DHC Sokol Poruba
- 2015–2016: TuS Koblenz-Horchheim
- 2016–2020: Frisch Auf Göppingen
- 2020-: DHC Sokol Poruba
National team
Years	Team	Apps	(Gls)
2010–	Czech Republic	65	(80)

Petra Tichá-Adámková (born 21 June 1991) is a Czech handballer for DHC Sokol Poruba and the Czech national team.

She participated at the 2018 European Women's Handball Championship.

== Achievements ==
- Czech First Division:
  - Winner: 2012
