= Selma Blažeková =

Slovak handball player (born 1991)

Personal information
- Nationality: Slovak
- Born: 2 March 1991 (age 35)
- Height: 1.64 m (5 ft 5 in)

Sport
- Sport: Handball
- Position: Right wing
- Current club: HK Slávia Partizánske
National team
Years	Team	Apps	(Gls)
–	Slovakia	23	(19)

Selma Blažeková (born 2 March 1991) is a Slovak handball player for HK Slávia Partizánske and the Slovak national team.
