= Olena Umanets =

Ukrainian handball player

Personal information
- Nationality: Ukrainian
- Born: 3 September 1990 (age 36) Uzhhorod, Ukrainian SSR, Soviet Union
- Height: 1.78 m (5 ft 10 in)

Sport
- Sport: Handball
- Position: Left back
- Current club: HC Gomel
- Number: 3
National team
Years	Team	Apps	(Gls)
–	Ukraine	4	(5)

Olena Umanets (born 3 September 1990) is a Ukrainian handball player for HC Gomel and the Ukrainian national team.
