= Slovakia women's national handball team =

Information
- Association: Slovak Handball Federation
- Coach: Jorge Dueñas

Colours
1st	2nd

Results

World Championship
- Appearances: 2 (First in 1995)
- Best result: 12th (1995)

European Championship
- Appearances: 3 (First in 1994)
- Best result: 12th (1994, 2014)
- Last updated on Unknown.

The Slovakia women's national handball team is the national team of Slovakia. Before 1994, it was a part of the Czechoslovakia women's national handball team. Their first tournament was the 1994 European Women's Handball Championship, where they finished 12th.

== Competitive record ==
Champions Runners-up Third place Fourth place

=== Olympic Games ===
Slovakia has never appeared at the Olympic Games and has yet to qualify.

Year	Position	GP	W	D	L	GS	GA	GD
(United States) 1996	Did not qualify							
(Australia) 2000	Did not qualify							
(Greece) 2004	Did not qualify							
(China) 2008	Did not qualify							
(United Kingdom) 2012	Did not qualify							
(Brazil) 2016	Did not qualify							
(Japan) 2020	Did not qualify							
(France) 2024	Did not qualify							
(United States) 2028	TBD							
(Australia) 2032	TBD							
Total	0/10	0	0	0	0	0	0	0

=== World Championships ===
Year	Position	GP	W	D	L	GS	GA	GD
(Norway) 1993	Participated as Czech Republic & Slovakia							
(Austria) (Hungary) 1995	12th	8	2	1	5	184	204	−20
(Germany) 1997	Did not qualify							
(Denmark) (Norway) 1999	Did not qualify							
(Italy) 2001	Did not qualify							
(France) 2003	Did not qualify							
(Russia) 2005	Did not qualify							
(France) 2007	Did not qualify							
(China) 2009	Did not qualify							
(Brazil) 2011	Did not qualify							
(Serbia) 2013	Did not qualify							
(Denmark) 2015	Did not qualify							
(Germany) 2017	Did not qualify							
(Spain) 2021	26th	7	3	0	4	169	172	−3
(Denmark) (Norway) (Sweden) 2023	Did not qualify							
(Germany) (Netherlands) 2025	Did not qualify							
(Hungary) 2027	TBD							
(Spain) 2029	TBD							
(Czech Republic) (Poland) 2031	TBD							
Total	2/18	15	5	1	9	353	376	−23

=== European Championship ===
Year	Position	GP	W	D	L	GS	GA	GD
(Germany) 1994	12th	5	0	1	5	111	148	−37
(Denmark) 1996	Did not qualify							
(Netherlands) 1998	Did not qualify							
(Romania) 2000	Did not qualify							
(Denmark) 2002	Did not qualify							
(Hungary) 2004	Did not qualify							
(Sweden) 2006	Did not qualify							
(North Macedonia) 2008	Did not qualify							
(Denmark) (Norway) 2010	Did not qualify							
(Serbia) 2012	Did not qualify							
(Croatia) (Hungary) 2014	12th	6	1	0	5	129	167	−38
(Sweden) 2016	Did not qualify							
(France) 2018	Did not qualify							
(Denmark) (Norway) 2020	Did not qualify							
(Montenegro) (North Macedonia) (Slovenia) 2022	Did not qualify							
(Austria) (Hungary) (Switzerland) 2024	24th	3	0	0	3	63	112	−49
(Czech Republic) (Poland) (Romania) (Slovakia) (Turkey) 2026	Qualified as co-host							
(Denmark) (Norway) (Sweden) 2028	TBD							
(Belgium) (France) 2030	TBD							
(Denmark) (Germany) (Poland) 2032	TBD							
Total	3/20	14	1	1	13	303	427	−124

=== Other competitions ===
- Carpathian Trophy 2005 – 2nd

== Current squad ==
The squad for the 2026 European Women's Handball Championship.

Head coach: Ján Beňadik

No.	Pos.	Name	Date of birth (age)	Height	App.	Goals	Club
5	RW	Lujza Rozi Bölcskei	17 July 2008 (age 18)	1.70 m	0	0	(Slovakia) HC Tatran Stupava
7	RW	Nataliia Dmytrenko	5 October 2003 (age 23)	1.64 m	25	18	(Ukraine) HC Galychanka
8	CB	Diana Vargová	8 June 2003 (age 23)	1.69 m	23	39	(Slovakia) HK Slovan Duslo Šaľa
9	LW	Olivia Šcípová	12 September 2000 (age 26)	1.71 m	50	115	(Poland) Enea MKS Gnieznoa
11	LB	Olivia Šcípová	21 August 2002 (age 24)	1.78 m	43	51	(Poland) Enea MKS Gnieznoa
12	GK	Soňa Furgaláková	11 August 1999 (age 27)	1.73 m	37	0	(Slovakia) HK Slovan Duslo Šaľa
14	LB	Tatiana Šutranová	26 August 1997 (age 29)	1.80 m	19	42	(Croatia) ŽRK Bjelovar
18	RW	Lenka Ratvajská	18 September 2000 (age 26)	1.63 m	35	42	(Iceland) KA/Þór
22	LW	Emma Lukáčová	31 August 2005 (age 21)	1.73 m	2	1	(Slovakia) IUVENTA Michalovce
24	P	Kristína Pastorková	16 September 1997 (age 29)	1.74 m	51	40	(Slovakia) HC DAC Dunajská Streda
28	RB	Barbora Lancz	28 July 2002 (age 24)	1.71 m	60	311	(Hungary) MTK Budapest
29	P	Viktoria Györiova	13 May 2003 (age 23)	1.74 m	42	36	(Hungary) Kisvárdai KC
33	LB	Anette Emma Hudáková	25 March 1998 (age 28)	1.78 m	32	5	(Hungary) Moyra-Budaörs Handball
38	CB	Dorota Bacenkova	25 June 2004 (age 22)	1.70 m	22	31	(Hungary) Kisvárdai KC
44	LW	Karin Bujnohova	11 July 2002 (age 24)	1.68 m	12	12	(Hungary) Szombathelyi KKA
61	GK	Iryna Yablonska-Bobal	3 December 1991 (age 34)	1.75 m	19	1	(Slovakia) IUVENTA Michalovce
68	RB	Liliana Gogová	29 September 2008 (age 18)	1.76 m	2	1	(Slovakia) ŠKP Topoľčany
77	GK	Barbora Jakubíková	29 March 2004 (age 22)	1.83 m	2	0	(Slovakia) IUVENTA Michalovce
98	P	Anastasija Bjalončík	21 April 2002 (age 24)	1.82 m	1	2	(Slovakia) HC DAC Dunajská Streda
99	CB	Barbora Sabovová	6 May 2007 (age 19)	1.64 m	4	6	(Slovakia) IUVENTA Michalovce
