= Liliana Țopea =

Austrian handball player (born 1967)

Personal information
- Nationality: Romanian, Austrian
- Born: 4 January 1967 (age 59)

Sport
- Sport: Handball

Youth career
- Years: Team
- –: CSȘ Făgăraș

Senior clubs
- Years: Team
- –1990: Chimistul Râmnicu Vâlcea
- 1990–1991: TV Lützellinden
- 1991–1994: Hypo Niederösterreich
- 1994–2000: UHC Stockerau
National team
- Years: Team
- –: Austria

Liliana Țopea (born 4 January 1967) is a Romanian and then Austrian retired handball player.

She competed at the 1992 Summer Olympics, where Austria placed 5th.

== Honours ==
=== Club ===
International competitions

- IHF Cup: 1989
- Champions Cup/League: 1991, 1992, 1993, 1994

National competitions

- Romanian League Champion: 1989, 1990
- Romanian Cup: 1990
- Austrian League Champion: 1992, 1993, 1994
- Austrian Cup: 1992, 1993, 1994
