= Ivica Rimanić =

Croatian handball player (born 1956)

Personal information
- Nationality: Croatian
- Born: 3 November 1956 (age 69) Rijeka, SFR Yugoslavia

Sport
- Sport: Handball
- Current club: Bjarg and Gneist, Bergen, Norway
- Number: 10

Senior clubs
- Years: Team
- 1972–1974: RK Partizan Zamet
- 1974–1976: RK Kvarner Rijeka
- 1976–1983: RK Zamet Rijeka
National team
Years	Team	Apps	(Gls)
1979	SR Croatia	2	(5)
1979-1980	Yugoslavia	7	(14)

Teams managed
- 1980–1981: Zamet Rijeka
- 1984–1989: Byåsen
- 1989–1992: Stavanger IF
- 1992–1996: Hypo NÖ
- 1995–1996: Austria (women)
- 1996–1998: RK Podravka Koprivnica
- 1997: Norway (men)
- 1999–2001: Kuwait SC
- 2001–2005: Nordstrand IF
- 2006–2008: Japan (men)
- 2008–2009: CS Oltchim Râmnicu Vâlcea
- 2009–2011: Slovenia (women)
- 2011–2012: Iran (men)
Medal record
Representing Austria
European Championship
Bronze medal – third place	1996 Denmark	Coach

Ivica Rimanić (born 3 November 1956) is a former Croatian handball player.

== Career ==
Ivica Rimanić started his senior career in 1972 at RK Zamet. After playing 2 years for Zamet he moved to rivals RK Kvarner. With Kvarner Rimarić was part of the team that got Kvarner promoted to the Yugoslav First League. After one season in the first tier Kvarner was relegated. After the relegation Rimanić moved back to Zamet where he spent the next seven years.

In 1977 Zamet was promoted to the Yugoslav Second League and in 1978 they were promoted to the Yugoslav First League. At this time Rimanić was also the club's treasurer and coach of the youth team. In 1979 Zamet was relegated back to the Second League. The same season Rimanić was called up to play for the Yugoslav national team at the Karpat Cup and Cup of Zaria Vastoka. He played 7 matches for the national team and scored 14 goals. He also had 2 appearances for the team of SR Croatia.

In 1980 Rimanić was briefly the head coach of Zamet because he had to go to military training. After he returned from the army in 1982 he started working more with youths.

In 1984 Rimanić got a call to come to Trondheim to coach women's handball club Byåsen. He came to save the club from relegation but ended up winning four league and two cup titles. In 1989 he started coaching the men's club Stavanger IF. He was champion two times with his team in 1990 and 1992.

In 1992 Rimanić started coaching Austrian women's club Hypo Niederösterreich. In his first season with the club he won both domestic titles and the last edition of the European Champions Cup. The next season Rimanić secured the domestic titles with his club again and won the first edition of the EHF Champions League. The 1994–95 season went the same but in 1995-96 Hypo lost to RK Podravka Koprivnica in the EHF Champions League final.

In 1995 Rimanić became the head coach of Austria women's national handball team. With the team he won the first medal in Austria handball history, bronze medal from 1996 European Women's Handball Championship.

Rimanić spent two seasons with Croatian women's handball powerhouse Podravka Koprivnica. In the first season he won both domestic titles and got to the quarter-final of the EHF Champions League the next season the club reached the semi-final.

In 1997 he was appointed as the interim head coach of the Norway men's national team, after Harald Madsen had withdrawn due to health concerns. Rimanić coached Kuwait SC from 1999 to 2001, being runner up in the league for both seasons. In 2001 Rimanić returned to Norway where he coached the women's side of Nordstrand IF for four years. He won the Cup three times and the league once.

From 2006 to 2008 Rimanić was the head coach of men's Japan men's national handball team. From 2009 to 2011 he was the head coach of the Slovenia women's national handball team.

In 2019 he began coaching the Norwegian handball club Bjørnar IL. His players have experienced that he hates trick and lob shots.

== Honours ==
Player
Zamet

- Yugoslav Second League (1): 1977-78
- Yugoslav Third League (1): 1976-77

Kvarner

- Yugoslav Second League (1): 1974-75

Coach
Byåsenr

- Grundigligaen (4): 1985, 1986, 1988, 1989
- Norwegian Cup (2): 1988, 1989

Stavanger IF

- Grundigligaen (2): 1990, 1992

Hypo NÖ

- Austrian Bundesliga (4): 1992-93, 1993-94, 1994-95, 1995-96
- ÖHB Cup (4): 1993, 1994, 1995, 1996
- European Champions Cup (1): 1992-93
- EHF Champions League (3): 1993-94, 1994-95

Podravka Koprivnica

- Croatia First A League (2): 1996-97, 1997-98
- Croatian Cup (2): 1997, 1998

Nordstrand 2000 Oslo

- Grundigligaen (1): 2003-04
- Norwegian Cup (3): 2002, 2003, 2004

Oltchim Râmnicu Vâlcea

- Liga Națională (1): 2009

Bjarg

Regional champion 2017 girls jr division

Individual

- Postage stamp with his face by: Norwegian Handball Federation - 2012
