= 1985–86 Women's European Cup (handball) =

The 1985–86 Women's European Champions Cup was the 25th edition of the Europe's competition for national champions women's handball clubs, running between October 1985 and Spring 1986. Defending champion Spartak Kyiv defeated CS Stiinta Bacau in the final to win its eleventh title.

== Quarter-finals ==
Team #1	Agg.	Team #2	1st	2nd
Gagny (France)	38–37	(Netherlands) Ookmeer	19–11	19–26
Feidig (Norway)	28–35	(Denmark) Frederiksberg	15–16	13–19
Íber Valencia (Spain)	50–17	(Portugal) Ginásio de Sul	27–8	23–9
Iskra Partizánske (Czech Republic)	Walkover	(Luxembourg) Bascharage		
Basel (Switzerland)	46–35	(Italy) Brixen	26–15	20–20
Cracovia (Poland)	51–9	(Belgium) Sasja Antwerpen	28–5	23–4

== Round of 16 ==
Team #1	Agg.	Team #2	1st	2nd
Spartak Kyiv (Soviet Union)	66–26	(France) Gagny	33–11	33–15
Vorwärts Frankfurt (East Germany)	51–30	(Denmark) Frederiksberg	23–13	28–17
Vasas Budapest (Hungary)	66–20	(Israel) Maccabi Ramat Gan	35–9	31–11
Niederösterreich (Austria)	51–38	(Spain) Íber Valencia	32–13	19–25
CSKA Sofia (Bulgaria)	41–44	(Czech Republic) Iskra Partizánske	23–19	18–25
Stiinta Bacau (Romania)	55–36	(Sweden) Stockholmspolisens	34–18	21–18
Bayer Leverkusen (Germany)	30–37	(Socialist Federal Republic of Yugoslavia) Budućnost Titograd	13–14	17–23
Basel (Switzerland)	37–48	(Poland) Cracovia	23–21	14–27

== Quarter-finals ==
Team #1	Agg.	Team #2	1st	2nd
Spartak Kyiv (Soviet Union)	49–34	(East Germany) Vorwärts Frankfurt	26–14	23–20
Vasas Budapest (Hungary)	42–37	(Austria) Niederösterreich	21–16	21–21
Iskra Partizánske (Czech Republic)	45–46	(Romania) Siinta Bacau	23–17	22–29
Buducnost Titograd (Socialist Federal Republic of Yugoslavia)	53–49	(Poland) Cracovia	27–17	26–32

== Semifinals ==
Team #1	Agg.	Team #2	1st	2nd
Spartak Kyiv (Soviet Union)	43–37	(Hungary) Vasas Budapest	28–19	15–18
Stiinta Bacau (Romania)	61–53	(Socialist Federal Republic of Yugoslavia) Budućnost Titograd	30–23	31–30

== Final ==
Date	Team #1	Agg.	Team #2	1st	2nd
27.04.1986 04.05.1986	Spartak Kyiv (Soviet Union)	52–45	(Romania) Stiinta Bacau	29–23	23–22
