= 2000–01 EHF Women's Champions League =

The 2000–2001 EHF Women's Champions League was the eighth edition of the modern era of the EHF's premier competition for women's handball clubs, running from 7 October 2000 to 23 May 2001. Krim Ljubljana defeated Viborg HK in the final to become the first Slovenian team to win the competition, with Budućnost Podgorica and Ferencvárosi TC also reaching the semifinals. Defending champion Hypo Niederösterreich didn't make it past the que group stage.

== 1st qualifying round ==
Team #1	Agg.	Team #2	1st	2nd
Spartak Kyiv (Ukraine)	61–36	(Bosnia and Herzegovina) Interinvest Mostar	32–21	29–15
Agrotel Plovdiv (Bulgaria)	35–69	(Croatia) Podravka Koprivnica	17–38	18–31
BGPA Minsk (Belarus)	48–65	(Poland) Montex Lublin	24–33	24–32
Madeira (Portugal)	53–49	(Federal Republic of Yugoslavia) Radnički Beograd	27–24	26–25
Spono Nottwil (Switzerland)	52–53	(Greece) Anagennisi Artas	25–26	27–27
Akva Volgograd (Russia)	70–35	(Turkey) TMO Ankara	34–19	36–16
VOC Amsterdam (Netherlands)	43–44	(Lithuania) Egle Vilnius	25–23	18–21
Slovan Duslo Sala (Slovakia)	71–36	(Italy) Siracusa	40–17	31–19

== 2nd qualifying round ==
Team #1	Agg.	Team #2	1st	2nd
Leipzig (Germany)	61–62	(Ukraine) Spartak Kyiv	33–27	28–35
Podravka Koprivnica (Croatia)	37–40	(Romania) Oltchim Rm. Valcea	18–19	19–21
Győri Graboplast (Hungary)	45–44	(Poland) Montex Lublin	23–19	22–25
Madeira (Portugal)	39–68	(Norway) Baekkelagets	22–31	17–37
Olimpija Ljubljana (Slovenia)	51–52	(Greece) Anagennisi Artas	31–27	20–25
Akva Volgograd (Russia)	40–36	(France) Metz	25–20	15–16
Amadeo Tortajada (Spain)	61–45	(Lithuania) Egle Vilnius	31–23	30–22
Slovan Duslo Sala (Slovakia)	53–55	(Denmark) Frederiksberg	29–27	24–28

== Group stage ==
=== Group A ===
Team	Pld	W	D	L	GF	GA	Pts
(Federal Republic of Yugoslavia) Budućnost Podgorica	6	3	2	1	171	149	8
(Russia) Akva Volgograd	6	3	1	2	148	126	7
(Austria) Hypo Niederösterreich	6	3	0	3	158	162	6
(Denmark) Frederiksberg	6	1	1	4	132	172	3

=== Group B ===
Team	Pld	W	D	L	GF	GA	Pts
(Hungary) Herz Ferencvárosi TC	6	4	0	2	175	142	8
(Norway) Baekkelagets	6	3	2	1	148	147	8
(Spain) Amadeo Tortajada	6	2	2	2	154	160	6
(Germany) Lützellinden	6	1	0	5	149	177	2

=== Group C ===
Team	Pld	W	D	L	GF	GA	Pts
(Denmark) Viborg	6	5	0	1	170	145	10
(Norway) Larvik	6	4	0	2	152	132	8
(Romania) Oltchim Rm. Valcea	6	3	0	3	159	150	6
(Greece) Anagennisi Artas	6	0	0	6	139	193	0

=== Group D ===
Team	Pld	W	D	L	GF	GA	Pts
(Slovenia) Krim Ljubljana	6	3	2	1	153	140	8
(Spain) Milar Valencia	6	4	0	2	160	159	8
(Ukraine) Spartak Kyiv	6	2	0	4	169	171	4
(Hungary) Győri Graboplast	6	1	2	3	156	168	4

== Quarter-finals ==
Team #1	Agg.	Team #2	1st	2nd
Milar Valencia (Spain)	48–53	(Denmark) Viborg	25–19	23–34
Akva Volgograd (Russia)	44–47	(Hungary) Herz Ferencvárosi TC	22–17	22–30
Larvik (Norway)	41–49	(Slovenia) Krim Ljubljana	24–20	17–29
Baekkelagets (Norway)	44–46	(Federal Republic of Yugoslavia) Budućnost Podgorica	24–26	20–20

== Semi-finals ==
Team #1	Agg.	Team #2	1st	2nd
Viborg (Denmark)	46–42	(Hungary) Herz Ferencvárosi TC	24–21	22–21
Krim Ljubljana (Slovenia)	53–48	(Federal Republic of Yugoslavia) Budućnost Podgorica	28–21	25–27

== Final ==
Team #1	Agg.	Team #2	05.05.2001	12.05.2001
Viborg (Denmark)	41–47	(Slovenia) Krim Ljubljana	22–22	19–25
