= 1961 Women's European Cup (handball) =

1961 Women's Handball European Cup
Tournament details
- Dates: 9 January – 18 March 1961
- Teams: 8 (knockout stage)

Final positions
- Champions: (Romania) Știința Bucharest
- Runners-up: (Czechoslovakia) Dynamo Prague

Tournament statistics
- Matches played: 7

The 1961 Women's Handball European Champions Cup was the inaugural edition of the premier competition for women's handball clubs. Eight teams from Austria, Czechoslovakia, France, West Germany, Poland, Romania, the Soviet Union and Yugoslavia took part in the competition, which took place from 19 January to 18 March 1961.

Știința Bucharest defeated Spartak Subotica, Zalgiris Kaunas and finally Dynamo Prague in the final's both legs to become the first European champion. It was the first of three titles won by Romanian teams to date.

== Quarter-finals ==
Team #1	Agg.	Team #2	1st leg	2nd leg
Știința Bucharest (Romania)	14 – 12	(Socialist Federal Republic of Yugoslavia) Spartak Subotica	5 – 6	9 – 6
Zalgiris Kaunas (Soviet Union)	13 – 9	(Poland) Cracovia	5 – 3	8 – 6
Mulheim (Germany)	25 – 10	(France) Ivry	13 – 3	12 – 7
Dynamo Prague (Czechoslovakia)	12 – 8	(Austria) Danubia Wien	8 – 6	4 – 2

== Semifinals ==
Team #1	Agg.	Team #2	1st leg	2nd leg
Știința Bucharest (Romania)	20 – 7	(Soviet Union) Zalgiris Kaunas	12 – 4	8 – 3
Mulheim (Germany)	5 – 10	(Czechoslovakia) Dynamo Prague	3 – 6	2 – 4

== Final ==
Dates
11.03.1961

18.03.1961

Team #1
Știința Bucharest (Romania)
Agg.
13 – 5
Team #2
(Czechoslovakia) Dynamo Prague
1st leg
8 – 1
2nd leg
5 – 4

Women's Handball European Cup
1961 Winner

(Romania) Știința Bucharest
First title
