= 1961–62 Women's European Cup (handball) =

1961–62 Women's Handball European Cup
Tournament details
- Dates: November 1961 – 1 April 1962
- Teams: 8 (knockout stage)

Final positions
- Champions: (Czechoslovakia) Sparta Prague
- Runners-up: (Socialist Federal Republic of Yugoslavia) ORK Belgrade

Tournament statistics
- Matches played: 14

The 1961–62 Women's Handball European Champions Cup was the second edition of the premier international competition for women's handball clubs. Like the inaugural edition, eight teams took part in the championship, which took place from November 1961 to 1 April 1962. Out of the eight founding members the Soviet Union didn't take part in the competition, while Romania was represented by national champion Rapid Bucharest and defending champion Ştiinţa Bucharest. Both teams were confronted in the quarter-finals, in the first match between two teams from the same country.

Sparta Prague won the competition by beating ORK Belgrade in the final. This remains the only edition won by a club from former Czechoslovakia and the last appearance of a Czech team in a final.

== Quarter-finals ==
Team #1	Agg.	Team #2	1st leg	2nd leg
Ştiinţa Bucharest (Romania)	14 – 12	(Romania) Rapid Bucharest	10 – 8	4 – 4
ORK Belgrade (Socialist Federal Republic of Yugoslavia)	10 – 9	(Poland) Cracovia	3 – 4	7 – 5
Mulheim (Germany)	9 – 6	(Austria) Danubia Wien	6 – 1	3 – 5
Sparta Prague (Czechoslovakia)	36 – 5	(France) Nantes	20 – 2	16 – 3

== Semifinals ==
Team #1	Agg.	Team #2	1st leg	2nd leg
Ştiinţa Bucharest (Romania)	11 – 13	(Socialist Federal Republic of Yugoslavia) ORK Belgrade	6 – 7	5 – 6
Mulheim (Germany)	9 – 12	(Czechoslovakia) Sparta Prague	7 – 6	2 – 6

== Final ==
Dates
22.03.1962

01.04.1962

Team #1
ORK Belgrade (Socialist Federal Republic of Yugoslavia)
Agg.
7 – 11
Team #2
(Czechoslovakia) Sparta Prague
1st leg
3 – 2
2nd leg
4 – 9

Women's Handball European Cup
1961–62 Winner

(Czechoslovakia) Sparta Prague
First title
