= Maccabi Ramat Gan =

Maccabi Ramat Gan may refer to:

- Maccabi Ramat Gan F.C., a football club based in Ramat Gan that merged into Hakoah Amidar Ramat Gan F.C. in 1959
- Maccabi Ramat Gan B.C., a basketball club that merged into Ironi Ramat Gan.
- Maccabi Ramat Gan (handball)
