= Cassano Magnago HC =

Italian handball club

- Full name: Cassano Magnago Handball Club
- Short name: Cassano Magnago HC
- Founded: 1974
- Arena: PalaTacca
- Capacity: 800
- President: Massimo Petazzi
- Head coach: Salvatore Onelli
- League: Serie A1
- 2021–22: 9th
- Club colours
Home	Away

Cassano Magnago Handball Club is an Italian handball club from Cassano Magnago established in 1974. It is best known for its women's team, which played in the Serie A1 between 1982 and 2002, and dominated the competition for a decade, winning a record eleven titles in a row between 1986 and 1996. In 1990 it reached the Champions League's quarterfinals. Nowadays the team plays in the second tier.

== Titles ==
- Serie A1
  - 1986, 1987, 1988, 1989, 1990, 1991, 1992, 1993, 1994, 1995, 1996
- Coppa Italia
  - 1988, 1995

== European record ==
Season	Competition	Round	Club	1st leg	2nd leg	Aggregate
1994–95	Champions League	1/16	(Slovakia) Jaspol Partizánske	24–25	24–21	48–46
1994–95	Champions League	1/8	(Croatia) Podravka Koprivnica	17–37	8–36	25–73
1995–96	Champions League	1/16	(Belarus) Politechnik Minsk	Withdrew		
1997–98	EHF Cup	1/16	(Socialist Federal Republic of Yugoslavia) ŽRK Sombor Dunav	19–26	15–26	34–52
1998–99	EHF Cup	1/16	(Slovenia) ŽRK Juteks Zalec	23–32	23–20	46–52
1999–00	EHF Cup	1/16	(Slovakia) Slovan Duslo Sala	17–37	18–40	37–57
2015–16	EHF Cup	R2	(Czech Republic) DHK Banik Most	17–30	20–27	37–57
2016–17	EHF Cup	R1	(Norway) Vipers Kristiansand	10–52	12–37	22–89
2018–19	Challenge Cup	R3	(Kosovo) KHF Istogu	24–26	21–23	45–49

== Men's handball team ==
=== Team ===
==== Current squad ====
Squad for the 2026–27 season

Goalkeepers
Left Wingers
Right Wingers
Line players

Left Backs

- (Serbia) Nikola Jezdimirović

Central Backs

- (Spain) Eduardo Cadarso

Right Backs

==== Transfers ====
Transfers for the 2026–27 season

Joining

- (Spain) Eduardo Cadarso (CB) from (France) C' Chartres MHB

Leaving

- (Italy) Giacomo Savini (CB) to (Germany) 1. VfL Potsdam
- (Sweden) Erik Östling (LP) to (Sweden) Skånela IF

=== Transfer History ===
Transfers for the 2025–26 season

Joining

- (Serbia) Nikola Jezdimirović (LB) from (Serbia) RK Crvena zvezda
- (Sweden) Erik Östling (LP) from (Sweden) Amo Handboll

Leaving
