= 1992–93 Women's European Cup (handball) =

The 1992–93 Women's European Champions Cup was the 32nd and final edition of Europe's competition for national champions women's handball clubs, taking place September 1992 and 15 May 1993. Starting with the following edition the competition was run by EHF, which changed its name to Champions League and its system to include a group stage. Defending champion Hypo Niederösterreich defeated Vasas Budapest in the final to win its fourth title in five years.

== Qualifying round ==
Team #1	Agg.	Team #2	1st	2nd
Víkingur Reykjavík (Iceland)	27–60	(Norway) Baekkelagets SK	13–30	14–30
Kuban Krasnodar (Russia)	38–37	(Slovenia) Olimpija Ljubljana	20–21	18–16
SL Benfica (Portugal)	49–65	(Spain) Mar Valencia	22–27	27–38
Cassano Magnago HC (Italy)	41–41	(Poland) Start Elbląg	23–19	18–22
LC Brühl (Switzerland)	68–21	(Israel) Hapoel Rishon LeZion	32–12	36–9
Initia Hasselt (Belgium)	28–31	(Netherlands) HV Swift Roermond	15–14	13–17
GOG Gudme (Denmark)	74–35	(Finland) FC Kiffen	32–16	42–19
Spartak Kiev (Ukraine)	32–37	(Czechoslovakia) Slovan Dusľo Šaľa	14–16	18–21
HBC Bascharage (Luxembourg)	29–60	(Lithuania) Egle Vilnius	10–30	19–30
Filippos Veria H.C. (Greece)	43–55	(Turkey) TMO Ankara	24–21	19–34
WAT Fünfhaus (Austria)	29–36	(Hungary) Vasas Budapest	17–15	12-21

Start Elbląg advanced on away goals rule (19 vs. 18).

== First round ==
Team #1	Agg.	Team #2	1st	2nd
Hypo Niederösterreich (Austria)	70–32	(Romania) Universitatea Bacau	36–16	34–31
Kuban Krasnodar (Russia)	33–39	(Norway) Baekkelagets SK	17–19	16–20
Mar Valencia (Spain)	49–38	(Croatia) Lokomotiva Zagreb	28–15	21-23
Start Elbląg (Poland)	38–38	(Switzerland) LC Brühl	21–13	17–25
GOG Gudme (Denmark)	34–34	(Netherlands) HV Swift Roermond	18–15	16–19
Walle Bremen (Germany)	39–29	(Czechoslovakia) Slovan Dusľo Šaľa	21–13	18–16
USM Gagny (France)	46–43	(Lithuania) Egle Vilnius	26–20	20–23
Vasas Budapest (Hungary)	45–32	(Turkey) TMO Ankara	26–14	19–18

GOG Gudme and Start Elbląg advanced on away goals rule (16 vs. 15 and 17 vs. 13 respectively).

== Quarter-finals ==
Team #1	Agg.	Team #2	1st	2nd
Walle Bremen (Germany)	36–36	(Denmark) GOG Gudme	19–12	17–24
Vasas Budapest (Hungary)	46–39	(France) USM Gagny	25–21	21–18
Baekkelagets (Norway)	36–59	(Austria) Hypo Niederösterreich	20–22	16–37
Start Elbląg (Poland)	33–42	(Spain) Mar Valencia	17–21	16–31

== Semifinals ==
Team #1	Agg.	Team #2	1st	2nd
Walle Bremen (Germany)	31–36	(Hungary) Vasas Budapest	13–14	18–22
Hypo Niederösterreich (Austria)	49–31	(Spain) Mar Valencia	26–14	23–17

== Final ==
Date	Team #1	Agg.	Team #2	1st	2nd
09.05.1993 15.05.1993	Vasas Budapest (Hungary)	25–40	(Austria) Hypo Niederösterreich	14–17	11–23
