= 1999–2000 EHF Women's Champions League =

The 1999–2000 EHF Women's Champions League was the seventh edition of the modern era of the premier competition for European national champions women's handball clubs, running from 1 October 1999 to 27 May 2000. Hypo Niederösterreich defeated Macedonia's Gjorce Petrov in the final to win its eighth title, with Budućnost Podgorica (which defeated defending champion Dunaferr NK in the quarter-finals) and Dynamo Volgograd also reaching the semifinals.

== Qualifying round ==
Team #1	Agg.	Team #2	1st	2nd
Politechnik Minsk (Belarus)	45–70	(Germany) HC Leipzig	29–32	16–38
Westfriesland (Netherlands)	35–74	(France) Metz Handball	16–33	19–41
Gjorce Petrov (North Macedonia)	73–24	(Luxembourg) HBC Bascharage	41–11	32–13
Baekkelagets (Norway)	54–37	(Czech Republic) Slavia Prague	25–19	29–18
HC Motor Zaporizhzhia (Ukraine)	76–19	(Cyprus) Kefalovrysos Kythreas	39–11	37–8
SPR Lublin (Poland)	73–43	(Sweden) Sävsjö HK	37–21	36–22
Hypo NÖ (Austria)	90–45	(Italy) De Gasperi	42–16	48–29
Anadolu (Turkey)	32–56	(Slovenia) Krim Ljubljana	17–26	15–33
Fémina Visé (Belgium)	31–80	(Denmark) Viborg HK	19–39	12–41
Martve Tbilisi (Georgia (country))	20–97	(Federal Republic of Yugoslavia) Budućnost Podgorica	10–52	10–45
Anagennisi Artas (Greece)	62–53	(Portugal) Madeira	34–24	28–29
Dynamo Volgograd (Russia)	48–45	(Romania) Oltchim Ramnicu Valcea	26–26	22–19
TSV St. Otmar St. Gallen (Switzerland)	31–85	(Hungary) Ferencvárosi TC	17–39	14–46
Podravka Koprivnica (Croatia)	37–36	(Slovenia) Banska Bystrica	22–18	15–18

== Group stage ==
=== Group A ===
Team	Pld	W	D	L	GF	GA	GDorg	Pts
(North Macedonia) Gjorce Petrov	6	3	1	2	141	146	−5	7
(Hungary) Ferencvárosi TC	6	3	0	3	156	149	+7	6
(France) Metz Handball	6	3	0	3	130	121	+9	6
(Denmark) Viborg HK	6	2	1	3	138	149	−11	5

=== Group B ===
Team	Pld	W	D	L	GF	GA	GDorg	Pts
(Austria) Hypo NÖ	6	5	1	0	177	143	+34	7
(Norway) Baekkelagets	6	3	0	3	151	148	+3	6
(Slovenia) Krim Ljubljana	6	2	1	3	153	146	+7	5
(Ukraine) HC Motor Zaporizhzhia	6	1	0	5	119	163	−44	2

=== Group C ===
Team	Pld	W	D	L	GF	GA	GDorg	Pts
(Federal Republic of Yugoslavia) Budućnost Podgorica	6	4	0	2	172	159	+13	8
(Russia) Dynamo Volgograd	6	4	0	2	164	149	+156	8
(Germany) HC Leipzig	6	3	1	2	162	15	+6	7
(Spain) CBF Elda	6	0	1	5	143	176	−33	1

=== Group D ===
Team	Pld	W	D	L	GF	GA	GDorg	Pts
(Poland) SPR Lublin	6	5	0	1	172	148	+24	10
(Hungary) Dunaferr NK	6	4	0	2	177	138	+39	8
(Croatia) Podravka Koprivnica	6	3	0	3	144	144	0	6
(Greece) Anagennisi Artas	6	0	0	6	134	197	−63	0

== Quarter-finals ==
Team #1	Agg.	Team #2	1st	2nd
Dunaferr NK (Hungary)	58–60	(Federal Republic of Yugoslavia) Budućnost Podgorica	33–33	25–27
Ferencvárosi TC (Hungary)	48–52	(Austria) Hypo NÖ	27–23	21–29
Baekkelagets (Norway)	41–57	(North Macedonia) Gjorce Petrov	23–27	18–30
Dynamo Volgograd (Russia)	56–49	(Poland) SPR Lublin	28–21	28–28

== Semifinals ==
Team #1	Agg.	Team #2	1st	2nd
Budućnost Podgorica (Federal Republic of Yugoslavia)	55–57	(Austria) Hypo NÖ	28–28	27–29
Gjorce Petrov (North Macedonia)	45–44	(Russia) Dynamo Volgograd	23–18	22–26

== Final ==
Team #1	Agg.	Team #2	19.05.2000	27.05.2000
Hypo NÖ (Austria)	52–45	(North Macedonia) Gjorce Petrov	32–23	20–22
