= Miša Marinček =

Slovenian handball player

Personal information
- Nationality: Slovenian
- Born: 18 February 1985 (age 41) Celje, SFR Yugoslavia
- Height: 1.85 m (6 ft 1 in)

Sport
- Sport: Handball
- Position: Goalkeeper

Youth career
- Years: Team
- –: ŽRK Žalec

Senior clubs
- Years: Team
- 1998–2002: ŽRK Žalec
- 2003–2004: ŽRK Celeia Celje
- 2004–2006: RK Krim
- 2006–2007: ŽRK Ptuj
- 2008–2009: RK Olimpija
- 2009–2010: RK Celeia Žalec
- 2010–2012: SG Witasek Kärnten
- 2013–2019: RK Krim
National team
- Years: Team
- –: Slovenia

Teams managed
- 2019–: ŽRK Celje
Medal record
Women's handball
Representing Slovenia
Mediterranean Games
Silver medal – second place	2013 Mersin	Team

Miša Marinček (born 18 February 1985) is a Slovenian retired handball player.

With Slovenia national team, she participated at the 2016 European Women's Handball Championship.
