= 1995–96 EHF Women's Champions League =

The 1995–96 EHF Women's Champions League was the third edition of the modern era of the 1961-founded competition for European national champions women's handball clubs, running from 7 October 1995 to 11 May 1996. Podravka Koprivnica defeated Hypo Niederösterreich in a rematch of the previous edition's final to become the first Croatian club to win the competition, ending the Austrians four-years winning streak.

== Round of 32 ==
| Team #1 | Agg. | Team #2 | 1st | 2nd |
|---|---|---|---|---|
| Stjarnan (Iceland) | 43–46 | (Greece) Anagennisi Artas | 24–16 | 19–30 |
| Podravka Koprivnica (Croatia) | 57–33 | (Switzerland) Brühl | 31–14 | 26–19 |
| Mar Valencia (Spain) | 85–26 | (Moldova) Dniester Tiraspol | 44–13 | 41–13 |
| Gjorce Petrov (North Macedonia) | 51–43 | (Netherlands) Swift Roermond | 27–19 | 24–24 |
| Politechnik Minsk (Belarus) | Walkover | (Italy) Cassano Magnago | | |
| Walle Bremen (Germany) | 88–30 | (Georgia (country)) Martve Tbilisi | 42–16 | 46–14 |
| Slovan Duslo Sala (Slovakia) | 42–48 | (Ukraine) Motor Zaporozhia | 25–22 | 17–26 |
| Baekkelagets (Norway) | 81–26 | (Israel) Hapoel Rishon LeZion | 45–10 | 36–16 |
| Madeira (Portugal) | 35–47 | (Federal Republic of Yugoslavia) Budućnost Podgorica | 15–20 | 20–27 |
| Niederösterreich (Austria) | 56-35 | (Poland) Montex Lublin | 34–20 | 22–15 |
| ASPTT Metz (France) | 54–38 | (Czech Republic) Zlin | 24–24 | 30–14 |
| Ferencvárosi TC (Hungary) | 47–42 | (Russia) Rotor Volgograd | 23–16 | 24–26 |
| Krim Ljubljana (Slovenia) | Walkover | (Azerbaijan) Baku | | |
| Viborg (Denmark) | 50–32 | (Belgium) Initia Hasselt | 26–15 | 24–17 |
| Ankara (Turkey) | 29–65 | (Romania) Ramnicu Valcea | 15–35 | 14–30 |
| Fünfhaus (Austria) | 47–45 | (Bulgaria) Burgas | 24–25 | 23–20 |

== Round of 16 ==
| Team #1 | Agg. | Team #2 | 1st | 2nd |
|---|---|---|---|---|
| Anagennisi Artas (Greece) | 38–72 | (Croatia) Podravka Koprivnica | 17–43 | 21–29 |
| Gjorce Petrov (North Macedonia) | 45–49 | (Spain) Mar Valencia | 27–22 | 18–27 |
| Politechnik Minsk (Belarus) | 37–58 | (Germany) Walle Bremen | 22–32 | 15–26 |
| Motor Zaporozhia (Ukraine) | 36–37 | (Norway) Baekkelagets | 17–18 | 19–19 |
| Budućnost Podgorica (Federal Republic of Yugoslavia) | 38–47 | (Austria) Hypo Niederösterreich | 20–17 | 18–30 |
| ASPTT Metz (France) | 39–56 | (Hungary) Ferencvárosi TC | 21–25 | 18–31 |
| Krim Ljubljana (Slovenia) | 40–40 | (Denmark) Viborg | 25–18 | 15–22 |
| Ramnicu Valcea (Romania) | 65–34 | (Austria) Fünfhaus | 32–18 | 33–16 |

== Group stage ==
=== Group A ===
| Team | Pld | W | D | L | GF | GA | GD | Pts |
|---|---|---|---|---|---|---|---|---|
| (Croatia) Podravka Koprivnica | 6 | 5 | 0 | 1 | 153 | 126 | +27 | 10 |
| (Spain) Mar Valencia | 6 | 3 | 0 | 3 | 143 | 141 | +2 | 6 |
| (Germany) Walle Bremen | 6 | 3 | 0 | 3 | 139 | 150 | −3 | 6 |
| (Norway) Baekkelagets | 6 | 1 | 0 | 5 | 128 | 146 | −18 | 2 |

=== Group B ===
| Team | Pld | W | D | L | GF | GA | GD | Pts |
|---|---|---|---|---|---|---|---|---|
| (Austria) Niederösterreich | 6 | 5 | 1 | 0 | 147 | 112 | +35 | 11 |
| (Hungary) Ferencvárosi TC | 6 | 3 | 2 | 1 | 145 | 137 | +8 | 8 |
| (Denmark) Viborg | 6 | 2 | 0 | 4 | 140 | 141 | −1 | 6 |
| (Romania) Ramnicu Valcea | 6 | 0 | 1 | 5 | 122 | 164 | −42 | 1 |

== Final ==
| Date | Team #1 | Agg. | Team #2 | 1st | 2nd |
|---|---|---|---|---|---|
| 04.05.1996 11.05.1996 | Niederösterreich (Austria) | 37–38 | (Croatia) Podravka Koprivnica | 17–13 | 20–25 |
