= 1998–99 EHF Women's Champions League =

The 1998–99 EHF Women's Champions League was the sixth edition of the modern era of the 1961-founded competition for European national champions women's handball clubs, running from 4 September 1998 to 16 May 1999. Dunaferr NK defeated Krim Ljubljana in the final to follow the steps of Vasas SC as the second Hungarian club to win the competition. Defending champion Hypo Niederösterreich was defeated by the Slovenians in the semifinals.

== Preliminary round ==
| Team #1 | Agg. | Team #2 | 1st | 2nd |
|---|---|---|---|---|
| Kefalovrysos Kythreas (Cyprus) | 39–46 | (Georgia (country)) Martve Tbilisi | 20–19 | 19–27 |
| Sparta Espoo (Finland) | 38–33 | (Luxembourg) Bascharage | 20–17 | 18–16 |

== Round of 32 ==
| Team #1 | Agg. | Team #2 | 1st | 2nd |
|---|---|---|---|---|
| Swift Roermond (Netherlands) | 32–65 | (Ukraine) HC Motor Zaporizhzhia | 18–34 | 14–31 |
| Lublin (Poland) | 76–20 | (Finland) Sparta Espoo | 40–10 | 36–10 |
| Istochnik Rostov (Russia) | 44–46 | (Romania) Oltchim Ramnicu Valcea | 23–20 | 21–26 |
| Podravka Koprivnica (Croatia) | 70–42 | (Italy) Rimini | 40–18 | 30–24 |
| TSV St. Otmar St. Gallen (Switzerland) | 46–67 | (Federal Republic of Yugoslavia) Budućnost Podgorica | 24–35 | 22–32 |
| ACDF Madeira (Portugal) | 38–76 | (Norway) Byasen | 18–36 | 20–40 |
| Anagennisi Artas (Greece) | 61–51 | (Bulgaria) Lokomotiv Plovdiv | 32–24 | 29–27 |
| ESBF Besançon (France) | 62–30 | (Belgium) Fémina Visé | 33–13 | 29–17 |
| Ikast (Denmark) | 83–27 | (Israel) Hapoel Petah Tikva | 49–8 | 34–19 |
| Niederösterreich (Austria) | 95–10 | (Bosnia and Herzegovina) Inter Mostar | 41–4 | 54–6 |
| Krim Ljubljana (Slovenia) | 69–51 | (Belarus) Politechnik Minsk | 39–29 | 30–22 |
| Dunaferr NK (Hungary) | 60–47 | (Slovakia) Slovan Duslo Sala | 34–26 | 26–21 |
| Egle Vilnius (Lithuania) | 45–41 | (Austria) Stockerau | 23–18 | 22–23 |
| Martve Tbilisi (Georgia (country)) | 21–86 | (Germany) Leipzig | 10–41 | 11–45 |
| Ostrava (Czech Republic) | 50–59 | (Spain) Mar Valencia | 26–35 | 24–24 |
| Istanbul (Turkey) | 40–63 | (North Macedonia) Gjorce Petrov | 18–33 | 22–30 |

== Group stage ==
=== Group A ===
| Team | Pld | W | D | L | GF | GA | GDorg | Pts |
|---|---|---|---|---|---|---|---|---|
| (Slovenia) Krim Ljubljana | 6 | 4 | 0 | 2 | 139 | 132 | +7 | 8 |
| (France) Besançon | 6 | 3 | 0 | 3 | 142 | 156 | −14 | 6 |
| (Croatia) Podravka Koprivnica | 6 | 3 | 0 | 3 | 148 | 152 | −4 | 6 |
| (North Macedonia) Gjorce Petrov | 6 | 2 | 0 | 4 | 153 | 142 | +11 | 4 |

=== Group B ===
| Team | Pld | W | D | L | GF | GA | GDorg | Pts |
|---|---|---|---|---|---|---|---|---|
| (Federal Republic of Yugoslavia) Budućnost Podgorica | 6 | 5 | 1 | 0 | 177 | 130 | +47 | 11 |
| (Spain) Mar Valencia | 6 | 3 | 0 | 3 | 149 | 154 | −5 | 6 |
| (Lithuania) Egle Vilnius | 6 | 2 | 0 | 4 | 152 | 164 | −12 | 4 |
| (Germany) Leipzig | 6 | 1 | 1 | 4 | 140 | 170 | −30 | 3 |

=== Group C ===
| Team | Pld | W | D | L | GF | GA | GDorg | Pts |
|---|---|---|---|---|---|---|---|---|
| (Austria) Niederösterreich | 6 | 5 | 0 | 1 | 171 | 140 | +31 | 10 |
| (Hungary) Dunaferr NK | 6 | 4 | 0 | 2 | 165 | 142 | +23 | 8 |
| (Romania) Oltchim Ramnicu Valcea | 6 | 2 | 0 | 4 | 154 | 157 | −3 | 4 |
| (Greece) Anagennisi Artas | 6 | 1 | 0 | 5 | 147 | 198 | −52 | 2 |

=== Group D ===
| Team | Pld | W | D | L | GF | GA | GDorg | Pts |
|---|---|---|---|---|---|---|---|---|
| (Denmark) Ikast | 6 | 3 | 2 | 1 | 150 | 123 | +27 | 8 |
| (Norway) Byasen | 6 | 3 | 1 | 2 | 135 | 139 | −4 | 7 |
| (Poland) Lublin | 6 | 2 | 2 | 2 | 142 | 143 | −1 | 6 |
| (Ukraine) HC Motor Zaporizhzhia | 6 | 0 | 3 | 3 | 127 | 149 | −22 | 3 |

== Quarter-finals ==
| Team #1 | Agg. | Team #2 | 1st | 2nd |
|---|---|---|---|---|
| Byasen (Norway) | 44–57 | (Austria) Niederösterreich | 26–27 | 18–30 |
| Mar Valencia (Spain) | 46–52 | (Slovenia) Krim Ljubljana | 21–29 | 25–23 |
| Besançon (France) | 50–62 | (Federal Republic of Yugoslavia) Budućnost Podgorica | 29–32 | 21–30 |
| Dunaferr NK (Hungary) | 50–48 | (Denmark) Ikast | 28–23 | 22–25 |

== Semifinals ==
| Team #1 | Agg. | Team #2 | 1st | 2nd |
|---|---|---|---|---|
| Budućnost Podgorica (Federal Republic of Yugoslavia) | 58–58 | (Slovenia) Krim Ljubljana | 29–32 | 29–26 |
| Niederösterreich (Austria) | 49–50 | (Hungary) Dunaferr NK | 24–20 | 25–30 |

== Final ==
| Team #1 | Agg. | Team #2 | 1st | 2nd |
|---|---|---|---|---|
| Dunaferr NK (Hungary) | 51–49 | (Slovenia) Krim Ljubljana | 25–23 | 26–26 |
