= 1994–95 EHF Women's Champions League =

The 1994–95 EHF Women's Champions League was the second edition of the modern era of the 1961-founded competition for European national champions women's handball clubs, running from 7 October 1994 to 7 May 1995. Defending champion Hypo Niederösterreich defeated Podravka Koprivnica in the final to win its fourth title in a row, an overall sixth. While Lokomotiva Zagreb had reached the competition's final in 1975, Podravka became the first Croatian team to attain this representing independent Croatia as war approached its end.

== 1/16-finals ==
Team #1	Agg.	Team #2	1st	2nd
Sportist Shumen (Bulgaria)	37–52	(Denmark) Viborg	18–24	19–28
Rostselmash (Russia)	60–30	(Poland) Start Elblag	33–14	27–16
Külturspor Ankara (Turkey)	42–38	(Iceland) Valur	20–22	22–16
Larvik (Norway)	73–16	(Israel) Hapoel Rishon LeZion	34–7	39–9
Olimpija Ljubljana (Slovenia)	45–40	(Belarus) Politechnik Minsk	25–19	20–21
Partizánske (Slovakia)	46–48	(Italy) Cassano Magnago	25–24	21–24
Podravka Koprivnica (Croatia)	44–36	(Switzerland) Brühl	19–18	25–18
AC Doukas (Greece)	38–36	(Luxembourg) Bascharage	19–18	19–18
HC Motor Zaporizhzhia (Ukraine)	55–25	(Portugal) Madeira	30–10	25–15
Gjorce Petrov (North Macedonia)	36–39	(Netherlands) Swift Roermond	24–16	12–23
ASPTT Metz (France)	49–39	(Czech Republic) Slavia Prague	24–19	25–20

== 1/8-finals ==
Team #1	Agg.	Team #2	1st	2nd
Viborg (Denmark)	32–45	(Austria) Niederösterreich	13–18	19–27
Rostselmash (Russia)	44–51	(Spain) Mar Valencia	19–26	25–25
Külturspor Ankara (Turkey)	32–55	(Norway) Larvik	21–24	11–31
Olimpija Ljubljana (Slovenia)	53–32	(Austria) Fünfhaus	25–15	28–17
Cassano Magnago (Italy)	32–45	(Croatia) Podravka Koprivnica	17–37	8–36
AC Doukas (Greece)	38–70	(Germany) Walle Bremen	21–33	17–37
HC Motor Zaporizhzhia (Ukraine)	40–43	(Hungary) Ferencvárosi TC	20–19	20–24
Swift Roermond (Netherlands)	46–45	(France) ASPTT Metz	27–23	19–22

== Group stage ==
=== Group A ===
Team	Pld	W	D	L	GF	GA	GD	Pts
(Austria) Niederösterreich	6	6	0	0	162	111	+51	12
(Spain) Mar Valencia	6	3	1	2	144	138	+6	7
(Norway) Larvik	6	2	1	3	141	144	−3	5
(Slovenia) Olimpija Ljubljana	6	0	0	6	115	169	−54	0

=== Group B ===
Team	Pld	W	D	L	GF	GA	GD	Pts
(Croatia) Podravka Koprivnica	6	3	2	1	147	127	+20	8
(Germany) Walle Bremen	6	3	2	1	141	138	+3	8
(Hungary) Ferencvárosi TC	6	3	1	2	135	129	+6	7
(Netherlands) Swift Roermond	6	0	1	5	124	153	−29	1

== Final ==
Date	Team #1	Agg.	Team #2	1st	2nd
29.04.1995 07.05.1995	Podravka Koprivnica (Croatia)	36–40	(Austria) Niederösterreich	17–14	19–26
