= TSC Berlin =

TSC Berlin might refer to:

- TSC Berlin (basketball)
- TSC Berlin (football)
