= 1984–85 Women's European Cup (handball) =

The 1984–85 Women's European Champions Cup was the 24th edition of the Europe's competition for national champions women's handball clubs, running between October 1984 and Spring 1985. Spartak Kyiv defeated defending champion Radnicki Belgrade in the final to win its tenth title.

== Qualifying round ==
Team #1	Agg.	Team #2	1st	2nd
Helsingør IF (Denmark)	41–33	(Iceland) Fram	21–15	20–18
Spartak Kyiv (Soviet Union)	Walkover	(Greece) Aris Nikea		
SC Leipzig (East Germany)	83–23	(United Kingdom) Wakefield Metros	46–11	37–12
Lokomotiva Mostar (Socialist Federal Republic of Yugoslavia)	68–36	(Italy) Brixen	37–17	31–19
HBC Bascharage (Luxembourg)	19–53	(Netherlands) Niloc Amsterdam	11–25	8–28
Arçelik SK (Turkey)	30–67	(Romania) Stiinta Bacau	14–37	16–30
Stade Français (France)	38–30	(Switzerland) ATV Basel	16–10	22–20
Íber Valencia (Spain)	40–27	(Israel) Harazim Ramat Gan	26–14	14–13
Baekkelagets SK (Norway)	39–43	(Poland) Slask Wroclaw	23–19	16–24

== Round of 16 ==
Team #1	Agg.	Team #2	1st	2nd
Bayer Leverkusen (Germany)	43–41	(Czech Republic) Tatran Presov	25–14	18–27
Helsingør IF (Denmark)	29–65	(Soviet Union) Spartak Kyiv	18–33	11–32
SC Leipzig (East Germany)	42–39	(Socialist Federal Republic of Yugoslavia) Lokomotiva Mostar	24–15	18–24
Niloc Amsterdam (Netherlands)	44–54	(Bulgaria) Georgi Dimitrov	20–23	24–31
Stiinta Bacau (Romania)	56–53	(Hungary) Budapesti Spartacus	29–22	27–31
Stade Français (France)	29–60	(Socialist Federal Republic of Yugoslavia) Radnički Belgrade	15–27	14–33
Íber Valencia (Spain)	35–60	(Austria) Hypo NÖ	20–29	15–31
Stockholmspolisens (Sweden)	43–40	(Poland) Slask Wroclaw	21–19	22–21

== Quarter-finals ==
Team #1	Agg.	Team #2	1st	2nd
Bayer Leverkusen (Germany)	30–45	(Soviet Union) Spartak Kyiv	14–21	16–24
SC Leipzig (East Germany)	49–42	(Bulgaria) Georgi Dimitrov	24–18	25–24
Stiinta Bacau (Romania)	44–45	(Socialist Federal Republic of Yugoslavia) Radnički Belgrade	22–19	22–26
Hypo NÖ (Austria)	61–29	(Sweden) Stockholmspolisens	28–10	33–19

== Semifinals ==
Team #1	Agg.	Team #2	1st	2nd
Spartak Kyiv (Soviet Union)	47–35	(East Germany) SC Leipzig	23–18	24–17
Radnički Belgrade (Socialist Federal Republic of Yugoslavia)	40–37	(Austria) Hypo NÖ	19–16	21–21

== Final ==
Date	Team #1	Agg.	Team #2	1st	2nd
07.04.1985 14.04.1985	Spartak Kyiv (Soviet Union)	41–31	(Socialist Federal Republic of Yugoslavia) Radnički Belgrade	23–16	18–15
