= 1991–92 Women's European Cup (handball) =

The 1991 – 92 Women's European Champions Cup was the 31st edition of Europe's competition for national champions women's handball clubs, taking place between September 1991 and 18 April 1992. Hypo Niederösterreich defeated defending champion TV Giessen-Lützellinden in a rematch of the previous edition's final to win its third title.

== Qualifying round ==
Team #1	Agg.	Team #2	1st	2nd
HV Aalsmeer (Netherlands)	41 – 25	(Belgium) Initia Hasselt	21 – 11	20 – 14
Irsta HF (Sweden)	51 – 35	(Iceland) Stjarnan	28 – 14	23 – 21
Tryst 77 HC (Scotland)	32 – 101	(Austria) Hypo Niederösterreich	17 – 50	15 – 51
Cassano Magnago (Italy)	56 – 34	(Portugal) Colégio de Gaia	31 – 19	25-15
WAT Fünfhaus (Austria)	45 – 32	(Greece) AC Doukas	23 – 11	22 – 21
Íber Valencia (Spain)	84 – 35	(Israel) Hapoel Petah Tikva	41 – 18	43 – 17
LC Brühl (Switzerland)	61 – 13	(Luxembourg) HC Bascharage	34 – 5	27 – 8
Walle Bremen (Germany)	69 – 30	(Greece) GE Verias	34 – 16	35 – 14

== First round ==
Team #1	Agg.	Team #2	1st	2nd
Chimistul Râmnicu Vâlcea (Romania)	71 – 53	(Netherlands) HV Aalsmeer	40 – 29	31 – 24
Irsta HF (Sweden)	54 – 43	(Poland) Pogoń Szczecin	26 – 20	28 – 23
Hypo Niederösterreich (Austria)	61-34	(Italy) Cassano Magnago	31 – 17	35-17
Rostselmach Rostov (Soviet Union)	47 – 49	(Norway) Gjerpen IF	25 – 26	22 – 23
TV Giessen-Lützellinden (Germany)	41 – 40	(Hungary) Hargita KC	26 – 19	15 – 21
Íber Valencia (Spain)	32 – 41	(Croatia) Lokomotiva Zagreb	18 – 20	14 – 21
LC Brühl (Switzerland)	36 – 46	(Germany) TuS Walle Bremen	18 – 19	18 – 27
USM Gagny (France)	44 – 36	(Czech Republic) Slavia Prague	24 – 18	20 – 18

== Quarter-finals ==
Team #1	Agg.	Team #2	1st	2nd
Chimistul Râmnicu Vâlcea (Romania)	58 – 55	(Sweden) Irsta HF	33 – 28	25 – 27
Hypo Niederösterreich (Austria)	54 – 42	(Norway) Gjerpen IF	28 – 19	26 – 23
TV Giessen-Lützellinden (Germany)	33 – 32	(Croatia) Lokomotiva Zagreb	20 – 10	13 – 22
TuS Walle Bremen (Germany)	47 – 34	(France) USM Gagny	20 – 14	27 – 20

== Semifinals ==
Team #1	Agg.	Team #2	1st	2nd
Chimistul Râmnicu Vâlcea (Romania)	56 – 72	(Austria) Hypo Niederösterreich	22 – 32	34 – 40
TV Giessen-Lützellinden (Germany)	40 – 35	(Germany) TuS Walle Bremen	20 – 16	20 – 19

== Final ==
Date	Team #1	Agg.	Team #2	1st	2nd
05.04.1992 18.04.1992	Hypo Niederösterreich (Austria)	34 – 32	(Germany) TV Giessen-Lützellinden	15 – 14	19 – 18
