= 1990–91 Women's European Cup (handball) =

The 1990–91 IHF Women's European Champions Cup was the 30th edition of Europe's competition for national champions women's handball clubs, running between September 1990 and April 1991. TV Giessen defeated defending champion Hypo Niederösterreich to become the third German club to win the competition after East Germany's HC Leipzig and TSC Berlin. Rostselmash and Buducnost Titograd were the last teams to represent former powerhouses Soviet Union and SFR Yugoslavia in the competition due to the collapse of both states in the following months.

== Qualifying round ==
Team #1	Agg.	Team #2	1st	2nd
Initia Hasselt (Belgium)	25–45	(Germany) TV Giessen	18–18	7–27
College Nicosia (Cyprus)	24–69	(Greece) Enosi Verias	14–42	10–27
SK Arcelik (Turkey)	38–59	(Socialist Federal Republic of Yugoslavia) Budućnost Titograd	23–21	15–38
HC Cassano Magnano (Italy)	62–29	(Israel) Hapoel Petah Tikva	26–17	36–12
Stockholmspolisens (Sweden)	36–44	(Iceland) Fram	18–16	18–28
AIFK Turku (Finland)	23–59	(Denmark) GOG Gudme	13–26	10–33
Geleen (Netherlands)	43–16	(Luxembourg) HC Berchem	24–6	19–10
ASPTT Metz (France)	41–38	(Czechoslovakia) RK Slovan Duslo Šaľa	21–16	20–22
Íber Valencia (Spain)	41–27	(Portugal) Benfica Lisbon	27–8	14–19
Építők SC (Hungary)	49–35	(Austria) WAT Fünfhaus	28–15	21–20
AZS Wroclaw (Poland)	43–39	(East Germany) Empor Rostock	23–18	20–21

== Round of 16 ==
Team #1	Agg.	Team #2	1st	2nd
GOG Gudme (Denmark)	Walkover	(Soviet Union) Rostselmash	23–29	Walkover
Byåsen IL (Norway)	57–31	(Iceland) Fram	34–16	23–15
Enosi Verias (Greece)	22–69	(Germany) TV Giessen	10–38	12–31
Cassano Magnago (Italy)	34–53	(Socialist Federal Republic of Yugoslavia) Budućnost Titograd	18–25	16–28
ASPTT Metz (France)	41–39	(Netherlands) V&L Geleen	27–22	14–17
Építők SC (Hungary)	37–34	(Spain) Íber Valencia	25–16	12–18
LC Brühl (Switzerland)	38–42	(Poland) AZS Wroclaw	19–22	19–20
Hypo NÖ (Austria)	42–39	(Romania) Chimistul Ramnicu Valcea	23–15	19–24

== Quarter-finals ==
Team #1	Agg.	Team #2	1st	2nd
Rostselmash (Soviet Union)	43–40	(Norway) Byåsen IL	28–22	15–18
TV Giessen (Germany)	59–48	(Socialist Federal Republic of Yugoslavia) Budućnost Titograd	26–23	33–25
ASPTT Metz (France)	28–34	(Hungary) Építők SC	15–18	13–16
AZS Wroclaw (Poland)	38–45	(Austria) Hypo NÖ	21–25	17–20

== Semifinals ==
Team #1	Agg.	Team #2	1st	2nd
Rostselmash (Soviet Union)	39–39	(Germany) TV Giessen	22–19	17–20
Építők SC (Hungary)	38–48	(Austria) Hypo NÖ	22–24	16–24

== Final ==
Date	Team #1	Agg.	Team #2	1st	2nd
05.05.1991 11.05.1991	TV Giessen (Germany)	43–40	(Austria) Hypo NÖ	21–15	22–25
