= 1993–94 EHF Women's Champions League =

The 1993–94 EHF Women's Champions League was the first edition of the European Champions Cup, the premier European women's club handball tournament, being organized by the European Handball Federation. The competition was renamed EHF Champions League and the format of the football 1991–92 European Cup and 1992–93 UEFA Champions League was adopted.

This inaugural edition of the Champions League was won by Hypo Niederösterreich in a replay of the previous season's final match against Vasas Budapest. It was their third European Cup in a row.

== First round ==
Team #1	Agg.	Team #2	1st leg	2nd leg
Eglė Vilnius (Lithuania)	31 - 55	(Denmark) GOG Gudme	16 - 31	15 - 24
Vasas Budapest (Hungary)	59 - 39	(Switzerland) LC Brühl Handball	33 - 15	26 - 24
GKS Piotrcovia (Poland)	39 - 62	(Croatia) Podravka Koprivnica	18 - 28	21 - 34
ASPTT Metz (France)	43 - 43 (a)	(Russia) Rotor Volgograd	30 - 21	13 - 22
Kometal Gjorče Petrov (North Macedonia)	42 - 41	(Netherlands) Swift Roermond	19 - 18	23 - 23
Hypo Niederösterreich (Austria)	54 - 31	(Czech Republic) Slavia Prague	30 - 14	24 - 17
TMO Kizilay (Turkey)	39 - 41	(Italy) Cavalco Cassano	26 - 19	13 - 22
Chimistul Vilcea (Romania)	62 - 27	(Israel) Hapoel Rishon LeZion	35 - 11	27 - 16
Kefalovrysos Kythreas (Cyprus)	41 - 66	(Belarus) Politechnik Minsk	14 - 33	27 - 33
TV Giessen-Lützellinden (Germany)	36 - 30	(Ukraine) Motor Zaporizhia	25 - 14	11 - 16
GE Verias (Greece)	36 - 39	(Belgium) Initia Hasselt	18 - 23	18 - 16
Gjerpen Skien (Norway)	40 - 7	(Luxembourg) HBC Bascharage	40 - 7	X - X
IK Sävehof (Sweden)	51 - 27	(Portugal) Benfica	18 - 23	18 - 16
Balonmano Sagunto (Spain)	55 - 26	(Iceland) Vikingur Reykjavík	26 - 16	29 - 10
Olimpija Ljubljana (Slovenia)	(w/o)	(Finland) Kiffen Helsinki	X - X	X - X
WAT Fünfhaus (Austria)	44 - 36	(Slovakia) Slovan Duslo Šaľa	26 - 17	18 - 19

== Eight-Finals ==
Team #1	Agg.	Team #2	1st leg	2nd leg
GOG Gudme (Denmark)	40 - 42	(Hungary) Vasas Budapest	27 - 20	13 - 22
Podravka Koprivnica (Croatia)	54 - 48	(Russia) Rotor Volgograd	31 - 19	23 - 29
Kometal Gjorče Petrov Skopje (North Macedonia)	35 - 47	(Austria) Hypo Niederösterreich	20 - 16	15 - 31
Cavalco Cassano (Italy)	41 - 54	(Romania) Chimistul Vilcea	21 - 29	20 - 25
Politechnik Minsk (Belarus)	39 - 66	(Germany) TV Giessen-Lützellinden	19 - 35	20 - 31
Initia Hasselt (Belgium)	33 - 50	(Norway) Gjerpen Skien	13 - 21	20 - 29
IK Sävehof (Sweden)	36 - 58	(Spain) Balonmano Sagunto	17 - 29	19 - 29
Olimpija Ljubljana (Slovenia)	44 - 51	(Austria) WAT Fünfhaus	25 - 29	19 - 22

== Champions League ==
=== Group A ===
Team	Pld	W	D	L	GF	GA	GD	Pts
(Austria) Hypo Niederösterreich	6	6	0	0	141	110	+31	12
(Spain) Balonmano Sagunto	6	2	0	4	126	133	−7	4
(Romania) Chimistul Vilcea	6	2	0	4	138	147	−9	4
(Croatia) Podravka Koprivnica	6	2	0	4	123	138	−15	4

Matchday One
Chimistul Vilcea	35–25	Balonmano Sagunto
Podravka Koprivnica	20–22	Hypo Niederösterreich
Matchday Two
Hypo Niederrösterreich	25–14	Chimistul Vilcea
Balonmano Sagunto	21–18	Podravka Koprivnica
Matchday Three
Balonmano Sagunto	14–18	Hypo Niederösterreich
Podravka Koprivnica	26–24	Chimistul Vilcea
Matchday Four
Chimistul Vilcea	24–25	Hypo Niederösterreich
Podravka Koprivnica	21–20	Balonmano Sagunto
Matchday Five
Balonmano Sagunto	27–19	Chimistul Vilcea
Hypo Niederösterreich	29–19	Podravka Koprivnica
Matchday Six
Chimistul Vilcea	22–19	Podravka Koprivnica
Hypo Niederösterreich	22–19	Balonmano Sagunto

=== Group B ===
Team	Pld	W	D	L	GF	GA	GD	Pts
(Hungary) Vasas Budapest	6	4	1	1	137	103	+34	9
(Germany) TV Giessen-Lützellinden	6	4	1	1	153	123	+30	9
(Norway) Gjerpen Skien	6	2	0	4	140	157	−17	4
(Austria) WAT Fünfhaus	6	1	0	5	128	175	−47	2

Matchday One
WAT Fünfhaus	21–28	TV Giessen-Lützellinden
Vasas Budapest	32–15	Gjerpen Skien
Matchday Two
TV Giessen-Lützellinden	19–19	Vasas Bucapest
Gjerpen Skien	32–21	WAT Fünfhaus
Matchday Three
WAT Fünfhaus	16–20	Vasas Budapest
Gjerpen Skien	24–25	TV Giessen-Lützellinden
Matchday Four
WAT Fünfhaus	33–31	Gjerpen Skien
Vasas Budapest	21–16	TV Giessen-Lützellinden
Matchday Five
TV Giessen-Lützellinden	35–23	Bidasoa Irún
Gjerpen Skien	23–16	Vasas Budapest
Matchday Six
TV Giessen-Lützellinden	30–15	Gjerpen Skien
Vasas Budapest	29–14	WAT Fünfhaus

== Final ==
Team 1	Agg.	Team 2	1st leg	2nd leg
Vasas Budapest (Hungary)	39 - 45	(Austria) Hypo Niederösterreich	18 - 20	21 - 25

EHF Women's Champions League
1993-94 Winners

(Austria) Hypo Niederösterreich
Fifth Title
