= RK Olimpija =

Slovenian women's handball club

- Full name: Rokometni klub Olimpija
- Nickname: Zmajčice (The Dragonesses)
- Short name: Olimpija
- Founded: 1949; 77 years ago (as RK Enotnost)
- Arena: Tivoli Hall, Ljubljana
- Capacity: 4,050
- President: Aleš Veber
- Head coach: Marjeta Veber Marton
- League: Slovenian First League
- 2025–26: Slovenian First League, 9th of 13
- Club colours

Rokometni klub Olimpija (English: Olimpija Handball Club), commonly referred to as RK Olimpija or simply Olimpija, is a women's handball club from Ljubljana, Slovenia. The club was established in 1949 as RK Enotnost. It competes in the Slovenian First League, the top tier of Slovenian women's handball.

== History ==
=== 1949–1965 ===
In 1949, Mitja Vidic organized a handball tournament between high schools in Ljubljana and invited the best players of the tournament to join the handball section of the sports club Enotnost. After the club disbanded in 1950, its handball section became an independent handball club, which changed its name to Svoboda in 1953. As the Slovenian champions in 1950, Enotnost participated in the finals of the Yugoslavian handball tournament, where they finished in the second place. This achievement made it possible for the team to compete in the federal national league. In their first season in the federal league, Enotnost finished fifth out of six teams. The team made its international debut on 7 July 1951, when Enotnost played against the Austrian team Grazer SV; the result was a 6–4 win for the Austrians.

In 1953, handball team Svoboda secured an unexpected second place in the Slovenian national championship. Over the next few years, Svoboda was a regular competitor in the national championship final tournaments and was ranked among the top Slovenian handball teams.

After 1960, the team encountered a setback and was pushed to the middle of the Slovenian league standings. In 1964, Svoboda was relegated from the national league and competed in the Ljubljana regional league. An important milestone for the club was in 1965, when Svoboda enlisted players from the Olimpija handball section and competed under the name Svoboda-Olimpija.

=== 1965–1979 ===
Božo Strman, the president of the club between 1961 and 1968, invited players from the best handball team in Ljubljana at the time, Šiška, to join the club and Olimpija was formed.

In this period, Mitja Vidic organized handball practices in schools and designed meticulously planned training schedules for Olimpija's senior team. Results were soon to be seen and the team finished the 1965–66 season in the third place. The next seasons were spent in the middle of the standings. but in 1972 Olimpija finished in the second place in the Slovenian national league and could therefore compete in the second federal (Yugoslavian) league. Olimpija competed in the second federal league for the next ten seasons.

=== 1979–1989 ===
In 1983, Olimpija became a member of the Yugoslav first handball federal league. The club also formed a new management. The best Slovenian handball players were invited to join Olimpija and in the next seasons some well-established Yugoslav handball players came to Ljubljana as well. In the 1981–82 season, the club's president became Igor Makovec. He managed to persuade individuals such as Vladimir Češnovar, Dare Jelčič, Zoran Tomšič, Ivan Sušnik, Karel Destovnik, Rajko Jauh, Srečko Ivanič, Peter Tevž, Gregor Kit, Milan Knez, Miloš Helmich, Radivoj Stanič and Jaka Jurček to actively contribute to Olimpija. Olimpija's head coach became Leopold Jeras and among new team players were Samardžija, Ivanovič, Černe, Bon, Štrukelj, Čotar and Lušina. Olimpija ended the 1982–83 season in the first place in the second federal league, and thus for the first time in club's history, Olimpija qualified to compete in the first federal league. Olimpija started their first season among the best handball clubs in SFR Yugoslavia (1983–84) with a win against ORK Beograd and ended the season in the ninth place (out of twelve teams). In the same season, Olimpija finished as the runners-up in the Yugoslav Cup. In the next two seasons, Olimpija finished in the fifth place, their standing improved by one position in the 1986–87 season and the following two seasons Olimpija finished in the third place.

=== 1990–2007 ===
First few seasons in an independent Slovenia were, judging by the results, successful, but the results were increasingly overshadowed by financial difficulties. Olimpija managed to sustain minimal financial and organizational structure but nothing more. New ambitions, plans and strategies were presented in 1995, when Olimpija was taken over by the company Robit ltd and its CEO Robert Žitnik became the club's new president.

Olimpija thus gained a new momentum and the players quality was proved by results in the national league and cup competitions. Before 2000, Olimpija never finished lower than in the second place in the league, behind RK Krim. They have also reached the finals of the Slovenian Cup five times and the semifinals three times. In the 1994–95 season, Olimpija competed in the EHF Women's Champions League, reaching the top 8. In the 1996–97 season, Olimpija won the Women's EHF Cup, defeating Borussia Dortmund Handball in the final.

Before the next season, Tivoli Hall hosted the Europe Top Four Robit Cup – the 4. European Cup Winners Tournament (1997). The winning team was the Spanish side Mar Valencia, Istočnik from Russia took the second place, Robit Olimpija came third, and Frankfurter Handball Club from Germany finished fourth.

=== 2008–present ===
Olimpija entered the 2008–09 season with a new management and the team's head coach, Robert Beguš. Besides perspective young Slovenian players, Olimpija has rounded the team up with Slovenian internationals Miša Marinček, Katja Čerenjak and Nina Jeriček.

In 2009, Olimpija celebrated its 60th anniversary. In 2012, the club was relegated from the Slovenian First League. Between 2013 and 2018, Olimpija competed only with youth selections.

== Arena ==
Olimpija play their home matches at Tivoli Hall with a capacity for 4,050 spectators.

== Honours ==
=== Domestic ===
- Slovenian Championship

Winners (3): 1991–92, 1992–93, 1993–94
Runners-up (6): 1994–95, 1995–96, 1996–97, 1997–98, 1998–99, 1999–2000

- Slovenian Cup

Winners (2): 1991–92, 1997–98
Runners-up (6): 1995–96, 1996–97, 1998–99, 1999–2000, 2002–03, 2004–05

=== European record ===
- Champions League

1994–95 – Top 8

- IHF/EHF Cup

1987–88 – Semifinals
1989–90 – Quarterfinals
1996–97 – Winners
