= Maccabi Ramat Gan (handball) =

Israeli handball team

מכבי רמת גן Maccabi Ramat Gan
- Full name: Maccabi Ramat Gan
- Founded: 1963
- Arena: Ohel Shem hall
- Capacity: 700
- League: Liga Leumit
- 2015-16: 9

Maccabi Ramat Gan is a handball team from the city of Ramat Gan, Israel.

== Titles ==
- Israel Champions (1): 1960
- Israel Cup Holder (1): 1978
