= EHF Women's Champions League =

European women's team handball competition

- Current season, competition or edition: 2026–27 Women's EHF Champions League
- Sport: Handball
- Founded: 1961; 65 years ago
- No. of teams: 16
- Country: EHF members
- Continent: Europe
- Most recent champions: (France) Metz Handball (1st title) (2025–26)
- Most titles: (Soviet Union) Spartak Kyiv (13 titles)
- Related competitions: EHF European League
- Website: ehfcl.eurohandball.com

The EHF Women's Champions League is the competition for the top women's handball clubs in Europe, organised annually by the European Handball Federation (EHF). It is the most prestigious tournament for clubs, with the champions of Europe's top national leagues participating.

== Tournament format ==
=== Current ===
Each year, the EHF publishes a ranking list of its member federations. The first nine nations are allowed to participate in the tournament with their national champion. In addition, the tenth spot is reserved for the best ranked national federation of the EHF European League. The national federations are allowed to request upgrades for their teams eligible to play in the EHF European League and based on the criteria list the EHF Executive Committee approves six upgrades.

The EHF Champions League is divided into four stages. All participating teams enter the competition in the group phase.

Since the 2020–21 season, the format sees two groups formed, with eight teams each in Group A and B. All the teams in each group play each other twice, in home and away matches (14 rounds in total). The first two teams in Groups A and B advance directly to the quarter-finals, while teams from positions three to six in each of these groups proceed to the play off. The pairings for the play off are decided by the placement of the teams at the end of the group phase (A6 vs B3, B6 vs A3, A5 vs B4 and B5 vs A4). Each pairing is decided via a home and away format, with the aggregate winners over the two legs advancing to the quarter-finals. The pairings for the quarter-finals are also decided by the placement in the group phase (Winner of A5/B4 vs A1, Winner B5/A4 vs B1, Winner A6/B3 vs A2, Winner B6/A3 vs B2). The ties are decided through a home and away format, with the four winners over the two legs played in each pairing advancing to the EHF FINAL4. The higher ranked teams in the group phase have the home right advantage in the second leg. The participating final four teams are paired for the semi-finals through a draw and play the last two matches of the season over a single weekend at one venue.

=== New format (2027/28–) ===
The new format will see 16 teams being split into four groups of four teams. The three top-placed teams advance to the main round, which conists of two groups of six, where the top four-placed teams advance to the quarterfinals.

== Summary ==
=== European Champions Cup ===
Year	Final			Semi-finals losers
Year	Champion	Score	Runner-up
1961; Details	(Romania); Știința București	13–5 (8–1 / 5–4)	(Czechoslovakia); Dynamo Prague	(Soviet Union); Žalgiris Kaunas	(Germany); RSF Mulheim
1961–62; Details	(Czechoslovakia); Sparta Prague	11–7 (2–3 / 9–4)	(Socialist Federal Republic of Yugoslavia); ORK Belgrade	(Germany); RSF Mulheim	(Romania); Știința București
1962–63; Details	(Soviet Union); Trud Moscow	11–8	(Denmark); Frederiksberg IF	(East Germany); Fortschritt Weissenfels	(Romania); Rapid București
1963–64; Details	(Romania); Rapid București	14–13	(Denmark); Helsingør IF	(Hungary); Spartacus Budapest	(Germany); Eimsbütteler TV
1964–65; Details	(Denmark); HG København	21–16 (14–6 / 7–10)	(Hungary); Spartacus Budapest	(Netherlands); Swift Roermond	(Socialist Federal Republic of Yugoslavia); Lokomotiva Zagreb
1965–66; Details	(East Germany); SC Leipzig	17–11 (10–5 / 7–6)	(Denmark); HG København	(Hungary); Spartacus Budapest	(Czechoslovakia); Sparta Prague
1966–67; Details	(Soviet Union); Žalgiris Kaunas	8–7	(East Germany); SC Leipzig	(Romania); Universitatea Timișoara	(Czechoslovakia); Bohemians Prague
1967–68; Details	(Soviet Union); Žalgiris Kaunas	13–11	(East Germany); Empor Rostock	(Poland); KS Cracovia	(Romania); Rapid București
1969–70; Details	(Soviet Union); Spartak Kyiv	9–7	(East Germany); SC Leipzig	(Soviet Union); Žalgiris Kaunas	(Denmark); HG København
1970–71; Details	(Soviet Union); Spartak Kyiv	11–9	(Hungary); Ferencvárosi TC	(Germany); 1. FC Nürnberg	(Denmark); HG København
1971–72; Details	(Soviet Union); Spartak Kyiv	12–8	(East Germany); SC Leipzig	(Hungary); Bakony Veszprém	(Romania); Universitatea București
1972–73; Details	(Soviet Union); Spartak Kyiv	17–8	(Romania); Universitatea Timișoara	(Netherlands); NILOC Amsterdam	(East Germany); SC Leipzig
1973–74; Details	(East Germany); SC Leipzig	12–10	(Soviet Union); Spartak Kyiv	(Germany); Eintracht Minden	(Socialist Federal Republic of Yugoslavia); Radnički Belgrade
1974–75; Details	(Soviet Union); Spartak Kyiv	14–10	(Socialist Federal Republic of Yugoslavia); Lokomotiva Zagreb	(Romania); IEFS București	(Hungary); Vasas Budapest
1975–76; Details	(Socialist Federal Republic of Yugoslavia); Radnicki Belgrade	22–12	(Netherlands); Swift Roermond	(Austria); Admira Wien	(Sweden); Stockholmspolisens IF
1976–77; Details	(Soviet Union); Spartak Kyiv	15–7	(East Germany); SC Leipzig	(Socialist Federal Republic of Yugoslavia); Radnicki Belgrade	(Norway); IL Vestar
1977–78; Details	(East Germany); TSC Berlin	19–14	(Hungary); Vasas Budapest	(Norway); IL Vestar	(Poland); Ruch Chorzów
1978–79; Details	(Soviet Union); Spartak Kyiv	27–26 (13–17 / 14–9)	(Hungary); Vasas Budapest	(Germany); Eintracht Minden	(East Germany); SC Leipzig
1979–80; Details	(Socialist Federal Republic of Yugoslavia); RK Radnicki Belgrade	45–29 (22–19 / 23–10 )	(Czechoslovakia); Inter Bratislava	(Sweden); Stockholmspolisens IF	(Bulgaria); VIG G. Dimitrov
1980–81; Details	(Soviet Union); Spartak Kyiv	39–26 (17–13 / 22–13)	(Socialist Federal Republic of Yugoslavia); Radnicki Belgrade	(Bulgaria); VIG G. Dimitrov	(Socialist Federal Republic of Yugoslavia); RK Osijek
1981–82; Details	(Hungary); Vasas Budapest	50–43 (29–19 / 21–24)	(Socialist Federal Republic of Yugoslavia); Radnicki Belgrade	(Soviet Union); Spartak Kyiv	(Romania); Rulmentul Braşov
1982–83; Details	(Soviet Union); Spartak Kyiv	48–36 (23–19 / 25–17)	(Socialist Federal Republic of Yugoslavia); Radnicki Belgrade	(Germany); Bayer Leverkusen	(Hungary); Vasas Budapest
1983–84; Details	(Socialist Federal Republic of Yugoslavia); Radnicki Belgrade	42–35 (22–16 / 20–19)	(Germany); Bayer Leverkusen	(Austria); Hypo Niederösterreich	(Hungary); Vasas Budapest
1984–85; Details	(Soviet Union); Spartak Kyiv	41–31 (23–16 / 18–15)	(Socialist Federal Republic of Yugoslavia); Radnicki Belgrade	(East Germany); SC Leipzig	(Austria); Hypo Niederösterreich
1985–86; Details	(Soviet Union); Spartak Kyiv	52–45 (29–23 / 23–22)	(Romania); Ştiinţa Bacău	(Hungary); Vasas Budapest	(Socialist Federal Republic of Yugoslavia); Budućnost Titograd
1986–87; 10,17.05.1987	(Soviet Union); Spartak Kyiv	50–37 (25–17 / 25–20)	(Austria); Hypo Niederösterreich	(Romania); Ştiinţa Bacău	(Czechoslovakia); ZVL Prešov
1987–88; Details	(Soviet Union); Spartak Kyiv	33–31 (16–14 / 17–17)	(Austria); Hypo Niederösterreich	(Hungary); Spartacus Budapest	(Socialist Federal Republic of Yugoslavia); Radnicki Belgrade
1988–89; Details	(Austria); Hypo Niederösterreich	37–33 (16–14 / 21–19)	(Soviet Union); Spartak Kyiv	(Hungary); Debreceni VSC	(Romania); CS Mureșul
1989–90; Details	(Austria); Hypo Niederösterreich	59–50 (29–24 / 30–26)	(Soviet Union); Kuban Krasnodar	(Romania); Chimistul Râmnicu Vâlcea	(Switzerland); SC Brühl
1990–91; Details	(Germany); TV Giessen-Lützellinden	43–40 (21–15 / 22–25)	(Austria); Hypo Niederösterreich	(Soviet Union); Rostselmash	(Hungary); Építők SC
1991–92; Details	(Austria); Hypo Niederösterreich	34–32 (15–14 / 19–18)	(Germany); TV Giessen-Lützellinden	(Romania); Chimistul Râmnicu Vâlcea	(Germany); Walle Bremen
1992–93; Details	(Austria); Hypo Niederösterreich	40–25 (17–14 / 23–11)	(Hungary); Vasas Budapest	(Spain); Mar Valencia	(Germany); Walle Bremen

=== EHF Women's Champions League (knockout system) ===
Year	Final			Semi-finals losers
Year	Champion	Score	Runner-up
1993–94; Details	(Austria); Hypo Niederösterreich	45–39 (18–20 / 25–21)	(Hungary); Vasas Budapest	(Spain); Mar Valencia	(Germany); TV Giessen-Lützellinden
1994–95; Details	(Austria); Hypo Niederösterreich	40–36 (17–14 / 26–19)	(Croatia); Podravka Koprivnica	(Spain); Mar Valencia	(Germany); Walle Bremen
1995–96; Details	(Croatia); Podravka Koprivnica	38–37 (17–13 / 25–20)	(Austria); Hypo Niederösterreich	(Spain); Mar Valencia	(Hungary); Ferencvárosi TC
1996–97; Details	(Spain); Mar Valencia	58–50 (35–26 / 24–23)	(Denmark); Viborg HK	(Austria); Hypo Niederösterreich	(Hungary); Ferencvárosi TC
1997–98; Details	(Austria); Hypo Niederösterreich	56–47 (28–21 / 26–28)	(Spain); Mar Valencia	(Croatia); Podravka Koprivnica	(Federal Republic of Yugoslavia); Budućnost Podgorica
1998–99; Details	(Hungary); Dunaferr NK	51–49 (25–23 / 26–26)	(Slovenia); Krim Ljubljana	(Austria); Hypo Niederösterreich	(Federal Republic of Yugoslavia); Budućnost Podgorica
1999–00; Details	(Austria); Hypo Niederösterreich	52–45 (32–23 / 22–20)	(North Macedonia); Kometal Gjorče Petrov	(Federal Republic of Yugoslavia); Buducnost Podgorica	(Russia); Volgograd Akva
2000–01; Details	(Slovenia); Krim Ljubljana	47–41 (22–22 / 25–19)	(Denmark); Viborg HK	(Federal Republic of Yugoslavia); Budućnost Podgorica	(Hungary); Ferencvárosi TC
2001–02; Details	(North Macedonia); Kometal Gjorče Petrov	51–49 (27–25 / 26–22)	(Hungary); Ferencvárosi TC	(Norway); Larvik HK	(Federal Republic of Yugoslavia); Budućnost Podgorica
2002–03; Details	(Slovenia); Krim Ljubljana	63–58 (30–27 / 36–28)	(Spain); Mar Valencia	(Denmark); Ikast EH	(Denmark); Viborg HK
2003–04; Details	(Denmark); Slagelse FH	61–56 (25–24 / 32–36)	(Slovenia); Krim Ljubljana	(Hungary); Dunaferr NK	(Norway); Larvik HK
2004–05; Details	(Denmark); Slagelse FH	54–43 (27–23 / 20–27)	(North Macedonia); Kometal Gjorče Petrov	(Hungary); Dunaferr NK	(Austria); Hypo Niederösterreich
2005–06; Details	(Denmark); Viborg HK	44–43 (22–24 / 20–21)	(Slovenia); Krim Ljubljana	(Spain); BM Sagunto	(Denmark); Aalborg DH
2006–07; Details	(Denmark); Slagelse FH	61–53 (29–29 / 32–24)	(Russia); Lada Togliatti	(Hungary); Győri Audi ETO KC	(Austria); Hypo Niederösterreich
2007–08; Details	(Russia); Zvezda Zvenigorod	56–53 (25–24 / 29–31)	(Austria); Hypo Niederösterreich	(Hungary); Győri Audi ETO KC	(Russia); Lada Togliatti
2008–09; Details	(Denmark); Viborg HK	50–49 (24–26 / 23–26)	(Hungary); Győri Audi ETO KC	(Romania); Oltchim Râmnicu Vâlcea	(Austria); Hypo Niederösterreich
2009–10; Details	(Denmark); Viborg HK	60–52 (28–21 / 32–31)	(Romania); Oltchim Râmnicu Vâlcea	(Hungary); Győri Audi ETO KC	(Norway); Larvik HK
2010–11; Details	(Norway); Larvik HK	47–46 (23–21 / 25–24)	(Spain); SD Itxako	(Montenegro); ŽRK Budućnost	(Hungary); Győri Audi ETO KC
2011–12; Details	(Montenegro); ŽRK Budućnost	54–54 (29–27 / 27–25)	(Hungary); Győri Audi ETO KC	(Romania); Oltchim Râmnicu Vâlcea	(Norway); Larvik HK
2012–13; Details	(Hungary); Győri Audi ETO KC	47–43 (21–24 / 23–22)	(Norway); Larvik HK	(Romania); Oltchim Râmnicu Vâlcea	(Slovenia); Krim Ljubljana

=== EHF Women's Champions League (EHF FINAL4 system) ===
Year	Final			Semi-finals losers
Year	Champion	Score	Runner-up	Third place	Fourth place
2013–14; Details	(Hungary); Győri Audi ETO KC	27–21	(Montenegro); ŽRK Budućnost	(North Macedonia); HC Vardar	(Denmark); FC Midtjylland
2014–15; Details	(Montenegro); ŽRK Budućnost	26–22	(Norway); Larvik HK	(North Macedonia); HC Vardar	(Russia); Dinamo Volgograd
2015–16; Details	(Romania); CSM București	29–26 (Pen)	(Hungary); Győri Audi ETO KC	(North Macedonia); HC Vardar	(Montenegro); ŽRK Budućnost
2016–17; Details	(Hungary); Győri Audi ETO KC	31–30 (OT)	(North Macedonia); HC Vardar	(Romania); CSM București	(Montenegro); ŽRK Budućnost
2017–18; Details	(Hungary); Győri Audi ETO KC	27–26 (OT)	(North Macedonia); HC Vardar	(Romania); CSM București	(Russia); Rostov-Don
2018–19; Details	(Hungary); Győri Audi ETO KC	25–24	(Russia); Rostov-Don	(Norway); Vipers Kristiansand	(France); Metz Handball
2019–20; Details	Cancelled due to the COVID-19 pandemic.			Cancelled due to the COVID-19 pandemic.
2020–21; Details	(Norway); Vipers Kristiansand	34–28	(France); Brest Bretagne Handball	(Hungary); Győri Audi ETO KC	(Russia); CSKA Moscow
2021–22; Details	(Norway); Vipers Kristiansand	33–31	(Hungary); Győri Audi ETO KC	(France); Metz Handball	(Denmark); Team Esbjerg
2022–23; Details	(Norway); Vipers Kristiansand	28–24	(Hungary); Ferencvárosi TC	(Hungary); Győri Audi ETO KC	(Denmark); Team Esbjerg
2023–24; Details	(Hungary); Győri Audi ETO KC	30–24	(Germany); SG BBM Bietigheim	(Denmark); Team Esbjerg	(France); Metz Handball
2024–25; Details	(Hungary); Győri Audi ETO KC	29–27	(Denmark); Odense Håndbold	(Denmark); Team Esbjerg	(France); Metz Handball
2025–26; Details	(France); Metz Handball	31–29	(Hungary); Győri Audi ETO KC	(Romania); CSM București	(France); Brest Bretagne Handball

== Records and statistics ==
=== Performance by club ===
Club	Winners	Runners-up	Years won	Years runners-up
(Soviet Union) Spartak Kyiv	13	2	1970, 1971, 1972, 1973, 1975, 1977, 1979, 1981, 1983, 1985, 1986, 1987, 1988	1974, 1989
(Austria) Hypo Niederösterreich	8	5	1989, 1990, 1992, 1993, 1994, 1995, 1998, 2000	1987, 1988, 1991, 1996, 2008
(Hungary) Győri ETO KC	7	5	2013, 2014, 2017, 2018, 2019, 2024, 2025	2009, 2012, 2016, 2022, 2026
(Socialist Federal Republic of Yugoslavia) Radnički Belgrade	3	4	1976, 1980, 1984	1981, 1982, 1983, 1985
(Denmark) Viborg HK	3	2	2006, 2009, 2010	1997, 2001
(Denmark) Slagelse DT	3	0	2004, 2005, 2007	
(Norway) Vipers Kristiansand	3	0	2021, 2022, 2023	
(East Germany) SC Leipzig	2	4	1966, 1974	1967, 1970, 1972, 1977
(Slovenia) Krim Ljubljana	2	3	2001, 2003	1999, 2004, 2006
(Montenegro) ŽRK Budućnost	2	1	2012, 2015	2014
(Soviet Union) Žalgiris Kaunas	2	0	1967, 1968	
(Hungary) Vasas Budapest	1	4	1982	1978, 1979, 1993, 1994
(Spain) Sagunto	1	2	1997	1998, 2003
(North Macedonia) Kometal Skopje	1	2	2002	2000, 2005
(Norway) Larvik HK	1	2	2011	2013, 2015
(Denmark) HG København	1	1	1965	1966
(Germany) TV Giessen-Lützellinden	1	1	1991	1992
(Croatia) Podravka Koprivnica	1	1	1996	1995
(Romania) Știința București	1	0	1961	
(Czechoslovakia) Sparta Prague	1	0	1962	
(Soviet Union) Trud Moscow	1	0	1963	
(Romania) Rapid București	1	0	1964	
(East Germany) TSC Berlin	1	0	1978	
(Hungary) Dunaferr NK	1	0	1999	
(Russia) Zvezda Zvenigorod	1	0	2008	
(Romania) CSM București	1	0	2016	
(France) Metz Handball	1	0	2026	

Zvezda Zvenigorod and CSM Bucuresti won titles in their debut season.

=== Performance by country (1961–2026) ===
Rank	Country	Winners	Runners-up	Semi-finals	Total
1	Soviet Union	16	3	4	23
2	Hungary	9	12	21	42
3	Austria	8	5	8	21
4	Denmark	7	6	9	22
5	Norway	4	2	7	13
6	Yugoslavia	3	6	11	20
7	East Germany	3	5	4	12
8	Romania	3	3	17	23
9	Slovenia	2	3	1	6
10	Montenegro	2	1	3	6
11	North Macedonia	1	4	3	8
12	Germany	1	3	11	15
13	Spain	1	3	5	9
14	Russia	1	2	5	8
15	Czechoslovakia	1	2	3	6
16	France	1	1	4	6
17	Croatia	1	1	1	3
18	Netherlands	0	1	2	3
19	Bulgaria	0	0	2	2
20	Poland	0	0	2	2
21	Sweden	0	0	2	2
22	Switzerland	0	0	1	1
Total		61	61	122	244

- Since 2013–14 EHF Women's Champions League have Third Place Match.

=== All-time top scorers ===
Last updated after the 2025–26 season

Rank	Players	Goals	Ssn pld	Position	Ref
1	(Romania) Cristina Neagu	1232	16	OB	
2	(Montenegro) Jovanka Radičević	1181	21	W	
3	(Serbia) Andrea Lekić	1073	18	OB	
4	(Hungary) Anita Görbicz	1016	18	OB/W	
5	(Slovenia) Ana Gros	1007	17	OB	
6	(Norway) Nora Mørk	964	17	OB	
7	(Montenegro) Katarina Bulatović	842	16	OB	
8	(Norway) Henny Reistad	827	8	OB	
9	(Brazil) Eduarda Amorim	747	17	OB	
10	(Montenegro) Bojana Popović	733 ^{1}	14	OB	
11	(Croatia) Andrea Penezić	720	11	OB	
12	(Russia) Anna Vyakhireva	686	10	OB	
13	(Norway) Linn-Kristin Riegelhuth	683	14	W	
14	(Norway) Heidi Løke	622	12	P	
15	(Hungary) Katrin Klujber	613	8	OB	
16	(Montenegro) Milena Raičević	581	17	OB	
17	(Brazil) Alexandra do Nascimento	560	13	W	
18	(Sweden) Isabelle Gulldén	544	13	OB	
19	(Hungary) Anikó Kovacsics	542	14	OB	
20	(Norway) Linn Jørum Sulland	539	11	OB	

Goalkeepers

1. (Brazil) Bárbara Arenhart 15
2. (Croatia) Jelena Grubišić, (France) Floriane André 7
3. (Norway) Silje Solberg, (Denmark) Sandra Toft 6

=== All-time top scorers of the WOMEN'S EHF FINAL4 ===
Last updated after the 2025–26 season

Rank	Players	Goals	FF apps
1	(Norway) Henny Reistad	93	6
2	(Norway) Nora Mørk	70	8
3	(Netherlands) Nycke Groot	57	5
3	(Hungary) Anita Görbicz	57	6
3	(Serbia) Andrea Lekić	57	6
6	(Romania) Cristina Neagu	56	5
7	(Sweden) Isabelle Gulldén	55	5
8	(Brazil) Eduarda Amorim	49	6
9	(France) Sarah Bouktit	47	4
10	(Norway) Stine Bredal Oftedal	48	6
11	(Slovenia) Ana Gros	45	4
12	(Croatia) Andrea Penezić	42	4
12	(Montenegro) Katarina Bulatović	42	5
14	(Montenegro) Jovanka Radičević	40	5
14	(Norway) Kari Brattset Dale	40	5

Notes

- 1: Goals from four seasons (1998–2002) are missing. Bojana Popovic's tally is higher than what is written here.

=== All-time top appearances ===
As of the end of the 2025/26 season

Player	Apps	Ssns	#Clubs	Pos.	ref.
(Montenegro) Jovanka Radičević		21		W	
(Norway) Katrine Lunde		20		GK	
(Norway) Nora Mørk		19		OB	
(Serbia) Andrea Lekić		18		OB	
(Hungary) Anita Görbicz		18		OB/W	
(Montenegro) Milena Raičević		18		OB	
(Romania) Cristina Neagu		18		OB	
(Serbia) Dragana Cvijić		17		P	
(Brazil) Eduarda Amorim		17		OB	
(Slovenia) Ana Gros		16		OB	
(Montenegro) Katarina Bulatović		16		OB	
(Slovenia) Barbara Lazović		16		OB	
(Portugal) / (Spain) Alexandrina Cabral		16		OB	
(Poland) Karolina Kudłacz-Gloc		16or17		OB	
(Montenegro) Maja Savić		15		W	
(Montenegro) Majda Mehmedović		15		W	
(Montenegro) Bojana Popović		14		OB	
(Sweden) Isabelle Gulldén		14		OB	
[[]]					
[[]]					

==== All-time Final Four top appearances - players ====
incomplete list

Player	Ssns	#Clubs	Pos.	ref.
(Norway) Nora Mørk	8		OB	
(Norway) Katrine Lunde	7		GK	
(Czech Republic) Jana Knedlíková	7		W	
(Brazil) Eduarda Amorim	6		OB	
(Serbia) Andrea Lekić	6		OB	
(Hungary) Anita Görbicz	6		OB/W	
(Norway) Henny Reistad	6		OB	
(Norway) Stine Bredal Oftedal	6		OB	

==== All-time Final Four appearances - coaches ====
incomplete list

Coach	Ssns	#Clubs	ref.
(Spain) Ambros Martín	8	2	
(Sweden) Per Johansson	5	2	
(France) Emmanuel Mayonnade	5	1	
(Norway) Ole Gustav Gjekstad	4	2	
(Denmark) Jesper Jensen	3	1	

=== Top scorers by season ===
Top scorers by season
Season	Player	Club	Goals
1993–94	(Russia) Natalia Morskova	(Spain) Mar Valencia	102
1994–95	(Croatia) Snježana Petika	(Croatia) Podravka Koprivnica	72
1995–96	(Croatia) Snježana Petika (2)	(Croatia) Podravka Koprivnica	77
1996–97	(Russia) Natalia Morskova (2)	(Spain) Mar Valencia	150
1997–98	(Russia) Natalia Morskova (3)	(Spain) Mar Valencia	127
1998–99	(Ukraine) / (Slovenia) Nataliya Derepasko	(Slovenia) Krim Ljubljana	120
1999–00	(Austria) Ausra Fridrikas	(Austria) Hypo Niederösterreich	97
2000–01	(Austria) Ausra Fridrikas (2)	(Norway) Bækkelagets SK	83
2001–02	(Hungary) Ágnes Farkas	(Hungary) Ferencvárosi TC	112
2002–03	(Slovenia) Nataliya Derepasko (2)	(Slovenia) RK Krim	81
2003–04	(Montenegro) Bojana Popović	(Denmark) Slagelse FH	98
2004–05	(Austria) Tatjana Logvin	(Austria) Hypo Niederösterreich	85
2005–06	(Slovenia) Nataliya Derepasko (3)	(Slovenia) RK Krim	86
2006–07	(Montenegro) Bojana Popović (2)	(Denmark) Slagelse FH	96
2007–08	(Hungary) Tímea Tóth	(Austria) Hypo Niederösterreich	127
2008–09	(Germany) Grit Jurack	(Denmark) Viborg HK	113
2009–10	(Romania) Cristina Vărzaru	(Denmark) Viborg HK	101
2010–11	(Norway) Heidi Løke	(Norway) Larvik HK	99
2011–12	(Hungary) Anita Görbicz	(Hungary) Győri ETO KC	133
2012–13	(Hungary) Zsuzsanna Tomori	(Hungary) Ferencvárosi TC	95
2013–14	(Hungary) Anita Görbicz (2)	(Hungary) Győri ETO KC	87
2014–15	(Romania) Cristina Neagu	(Montenegro) ŽRK Budućnost	102
2014–15	(Croatia) Andrea Penezić	(North Macedonia) HC Vardar	102
2015–16	(Sweden) Isabelle Gulldén	(Romania) CSM București	108
2016–17	(Croatia) Andrea Penezić (2)	(North Macedonia) HC Vardar	98
2017–18	(Romania) Cristina Neagu (2)	(Romania) CSM București	110
2018–19	(Norway) Linn Jørum Sulland	(Norway) Vipers Kristiansand	89
2019–20	(Montenegro) Jovanka Radičević	(Montenegro) ŽRK Budućnost	97
2020–21	(Slovenia) Ana Gros	(France) Brest Bretagne	135
2021–22	(Romania) Cristina Neagu (3)	(Romania) CSM București	110
2022–23	(Norway) Henny Reistad	(Denmark) Team Esbjerg	142
2023–24	(Russia) Anna Vyakhireva	(Norway) Vipers Kristiansand	113
2024–25	(Norway) Henny Reistad (2)	(Denmark) Team Esbjerg	**154**
2025–26	(Norway) Henny Reistad (3)	(Denmark) Team Esbjerg	131

=== WOMEN'S EHF FINAL4 MVPs by season ===
MVP by season
Season	Player	Club	Playing position
2013–14	(Norway) Katrine Lunde	(Hungary) Győri ETO KC	Goalkeeper
2014–15	(Germany) Clara Woltering	(Montenegro) ŽRK Budućnost	Goalkeeper
2015–16	(Croatia) Jelena Grubišić	(Romania) CSM București	Goalkeeper
2016–17	(Netherlands) Nycke Groot	(Hungary) Győri ETO KC	Centre back
2017–18	(France) Amandine Leynaud	(North Macedonia) HC Vardar	Goalkeeper
2018–19	(Norway) Kari Aalvik Grimsbø	(Hungary) Győri ETO KC	Goalkeeper
2020–21	(Norway) Henny Reistad	(Norway) Vipers Kristiansand	Centre back
2021–22	(Czech Republic) Markéta Jeřábková	(Norway) Vipers Kristiansand	Left back
2022–23	(Russia) Anna Vyakhireva	(Norway) Vipers Kristiansand	Right back
2023–24	(Norway) Stine Bredal Oftedal	(Hungary) Győri ETO KC	Centre back
2024–25	(Norway) Kari Brattset Dale	(Hungary) Győri ETO KC	Line player
2025–26	(France) Sarah Bouktit	(France) Metz Handball	Line player

=== Goals scored in the Final Four by nations ===
All goals (2667) scored in the Final Four by the nationality of the players.

Last updated after the 2025/26 season.

Rank	Nation	Goals
1	Norway	537
2	France	346
3	Denmark	234
4	Hungary	201
5	Russia	200
6	Montenegro	194
7	Netherlands	144
8	Sweden	120
9	Romania	116
10	Serbia	91
11	Brazil	88
12	Slovenia	80

Rank	Nation	Goals
13	Croatia	75
14	Germany	69
15	Czech Republic	61
16	Spain	33
17	North Macedonia	18
18	Poland	16
19	South Korea	12
20	Switzerland	7
21	Tunisia	7
22	Turkey	7
23	Ukraine	7
24	Belarus	3

=== Top Scorers by Team ===
Title	Team	Record
3	(Denmark) Team Esbjerg	154
3	(Spain) Mar Valencia	150
3	(Austria) Hypo Niederösterreich	127
3	(Slovenia) RK Krim	120
3	(Romania) CSM București	110
2	(Croatia) RK Podravka Koprivnica	77
2	(Denmark) Slagelse FH	98
2	(Denmark) Viborg HK	113
2	(Hungary) Ferencvárosi TC	112
2	(Hungary) Győri ETO KC	133
2	(Montenegro) ŽRK Budućnost	102
2	(North Macedonia) HC Vardar	102
2	(Norway) Vipers Kristiansand	113
1	(France) Brest Bretagne Handball	135
1	(Norway) Bækkelagets SK	83
1	(Norway) Larvik HK	99

=== Top Scorers by Country ===
(Nationality of the Top Scorer Players)

Rank	Country	Titles	Record
1	Norway	5	154
1	Hungary	5	133
2	Croatia	4	102
2	Romania	4	110
2	Russia	4	150
2	Slovenia	4	135
4	Austria	3	97
4	Montenegro	3	98
9	Germany	1	113
9	Sweden	1	108

=== Most goals in a season (≥100) ===
As of the end of 2025/26 season

Missing data from 2007–08, 2001–02, 1998–99, 1997–98, 1996–97, 1993–94 seasons.

Player	Goals	Season	Position	Sn with ≥100 goals
(Norway) Henny Reistad	154	2024/25	OB	4
(Russia) Natalia Morskova	150	1996/97	OB	3
(Slovenia) Ana Gros	135	2020/21	OB	2
(Hungary) Anita Görbicz	133	2011/12	OB/W	1
(Hungary) Tímea Tóth	127	2007/08	OB	1
(France) Sarah Bouktit	125	2025/26	P	3
(Portugal) / (Spain) Danila So Delgado	121	2025/26	OB	1
(Ukraine) / (Slovenia) Nataliya Derepasko	120	1998/99	OB	1
(Romania) Cristina Neagu	118	2022/23	OB	7
(Czech Republic) Markéta Jeřábková	118	2022/23	OB	2
(Russia) Anna Vyakhireva	117	2025/26	OB	2
(Hungary) Katrin Klujber	114	2022/23	OB	2
(Germany) Grit Jurack	113	2008/09	OB	1
(Hungary) Ágnes Farkas	112	2001/02	OB	1
(Norway) Nora Mørk	110	2023/24	OB	2
(Bulgaria) / (Slovenia) Elizabeth Omoregie	109	2024/25	OB	2
(Sweden) Isabelle Gulldén	108	2015/16	OB	1
(Montenegro) Bojana Popović	106	2011/12	OB	1
(Netherlands) Dione Housheer	106	2025/26	OB	1
(Czech Republic) Iveta Luzumová	105	2017/18	OB	1
(Denmark) Julie Scaglione	103	2025/26	OB	1
(Croatia) Andrea Penezić	102	2014/15	OB	1
(Romania) Cristina Vărzaru	101	2009/10	W	1
(Russia) Valeriia Maslova	101	2023/24	OB	1
(Denmark) Kristina Jørgensen	100	2023/24	OB	1

Goalkeeper with most goals in a single season is (Brazil) Bárbara Arenhart: 6 goals in 2021/22.

=== Most goals scored in a match ===
As of the end of the 2025/26 season
multiple entries of players are allowed
^{Q} - qualifying match

Penalty goals included (≥13)

Player	Goals	Season	ref.
(Hungary) Magdolna Oszvald	20	1984/85	
(Romania) Mariana Tîrcă	19	1984/85	
(Russia) Natalia Morskova	17	1996/97	
(Russia) Natalia Morskova #2	17	1997/98	
(Ukraine) / (Slovenia) Nataliya Derepasko	17	1998/99	
(Hungary) Hortenzia Szrnka	17	2001/02	
(Russia) Anna Kochetova	17	2010/11	
(Germany) Grit Jurack	17	2010/11	
(Romania) Mariana Tîrcă #2	16	1985/86	
(Romania) Mariana Tîrcă #3	16	1991/92	
(Russia) Natalia Morskova #3	16	1996/97	
(Russia) Natalia Morskova #4	16	1996/97	
(Hungary) Ágnes Farkas	16	2000/01	
(Hungary) Ágnes Farkas #2	16	2001/02	
(Socialist Federal Republic of Yugoslavia) / (Serbia) Milenka Lukić	15	1982/83	
(Romania) Mariana Tîrcă #4	15	1985/86	
(Romania) Mariana Tîrcă #5	15	1987/88	
(Germany) Grit Jurack #2	15	1999/00	
(Hungary) Ágnes Farkas #3	15	2001/02	
(Germany) Grit Jurack #3	15	2008/09	
(Sweden) Isabelle Gulldén	15	2015/16	
(Hungary) Anikó Kovacsics	15	2018/19	
(Norway) Henny Reistad	15	2022/23	
(Norway) Henny Reistad #2	15	2024/25	
(Norway) Henny Reistad #3	15	2025/26	
(Socialist Federal Republic of Yugoslavia) / (Serbia) Milenka Lukić #2	14	1979/80	
(Hungary) Magdolna Oszvald #2	14	1982/83	
(Romania) Mariana Tîrcă #6	14	1986/87	
(Socialist Federal Republic of Yugoslavia) / (Austria) Jasna Kolar-Merdan	14	1988/89	
(Socialist Federal Republic of Yugoslavia) / (Austria) Jasna Kolar-Merdan #2	14	1988/89	
(Switzerland) Vroni Keller	14	1989/90	
(Socialist Federal Republic of Yugoslavia) / (Austria) Jasna Kolar-Merdan #3	14	1989/90	
(Romania) Mariana Tîrcă #7	14	1991/92	
(Denmark) Anja Andersen	14	1992/93	
(Russia) Natalia Morskova #5	14	1997/98	
(Russia) Natalia Morskova #6	14	1997/98	
(Ukraine) / (Slovenia) Nataliya Derepasko #2	14	1998/99	
(Russia) Natalia Morskova #7	14	1998/99	
(Lithuania) / (Austria) Ausra Fridrikas	14	1999/00	
(Russia) Natalia Morskova #8	14	2001/02	
(Austria) Tatjana Logvin	14	2005/06	
(Romania) Cristina Vărzaru	14	2009/10	
(Montenegro) Bojana Popović	14	2011/12	
(Montenegro) Katarina Bulatović	14	2016/17	
(Spain) Nerea Pena	14	2018/19	
(Romania) Cristina Neagu	14	2019/20	
(Romania) Cristina Neagu #2	14	2019/20	
(Slovenia) Ana Gros	14	2020/21	
(Poland) Karolina Kudłacz-Gloc	14	2023/24	
(Russia) Anna Vyakhireva	14	2025/26	
(Norway) Anniken Obaidli	14	2025/26	
(Austria) Johanna Reichert	14	2026/27	
(Socialist Federal Republic of Yugoslavia) / (Serbia) Milenka Lukić #3	13	1979/80	
(Socialist Federal Republic of Yugoslavia) / (Austria) Jasna Kolar-Merdan #4	13	1989/90	
(Romania) Mariana Tîrcă #8	13	1984/85	
(Russia) Natalia Morskova #9	13	1997/98	
(Serbia) / (Hungary) Bojana Radulović	13	1998/99	
(Russia) Natalia Morskova #10	13	1998/99	
(Russia) Natalia Morskova #11	13	1998/99	
(Ukraine) / (Slovenia) Nataliya Derepasko #3	13	1999/00	
(Hungary) Ágnes Farkas #4	13	2000/01	
(Russia) Natalia Morskova #12	13	2000/01	
(Hungary) Ágnes Farkas #5	13	2001/02	
(Russia) Natalia Morskova #13	13	2001/02	
(Austria) Tatjana Logvin #2	13	2004/05	
(Austria) Tatjana Logvin #3	13	2005/06	
(Ukraine) / (Slovenia) Nataliya Derepasko #4	13	2005/06	
(Hungary) Anita Görbicz	13	2006/07	
(Montenegro) Bojana Popović #2	13	2006/07	
(Montenegro) Bojana Popović #3	13	2006/07	
(Hungary) Anita Görbicz #2	13	2007/08	
(Serbia) Andrea Lekić	13	2008/09	
(Norway) Linn-Kristin Riegelhuth	13	2008/09	
(Norway) Linn-Kristin Riegelhuth #2	13	2008/09	
(Hungary) Anita Görbicz #3	13	2008/09	
(Norway) Linn Sulland	13	2009/10	
(Brazil) Alexandra do Nascimento	13	2009/10	
(Norway) Kristine Breistøl	13	2015/16	
(Kazakhstan) / (Russia) Karina Sabirova	13	2016/17	
(Norway) Nora Mørk	13	2017/18	
(Czech Republic) Iveta Luzumová	13	2017/18	
(Montenegro) Jovanka Radičević	13	2018/19	
(Brazil) Fernanda da Silva	^{Q}13	2018/19	
(Montenegro) Jovanka Radičević #2	13	2019/20	
(Romania) Cristina Neagu #3	13	2020/21	
(Norway) Henny Reistad #4	13	2021/22	
(Montenegro) Milena Raičević	13	2022/23	
(Norway) Nora Mørk #2	13	2022/23	
(Romania) Cristina Neagu #4	13	2022/23	
(France) Sarah Bouktit	13	2023/24	
(Norway) Nora Mørk #3	13	2023/24	
(Norway) Henny Reistad #5	13	2023/24	
(Norway) Henny Reistad #6	13	2024/25	
(Norway) Nora Mørk #4	13	2025/26	
(Norway) Henny Reistad #7	13	2026/27	

Goalkeepers

1. (Brazil) Bárbara Arenhart 3 2021/22

Without penalty goals (≥12)

the list is incomplete

Player	Goals	Season	ref.
(Norway) Henny Reistad	15	2025/26	
(Norway) Henny Reistad #2	14	2022/23	
(Norway) Henny Reistad #3	13	2026/27	
(Norway) Anniken Obaidli	12	2025/26	

Matches (≥5) with at least 10 goals

the list is incomplete

Player	No. of Games	ref.
(Hungary) Anita Görbicz	27	
(Norway) Henny Reistad	≥26	
(Russia) Natalia Morskova	≥26	
(Romania) Cristina Neagu	≥25	
(Slovenia) Ana Gros	18	
(Montenegro) Bojana Popović	≥17	
(Ukraine) / (Slovenia) Nataliya Derepasko	≥16	
(Norway) Nora Mørk	≥15	
(Austria) Tatjana Logvin	≥15	
(Croatia) Andrea Penezić	≥13	
(Montenegro) Jovanka Radičević	≥12	
(Montenegro) Katarina Bulatović	≥12	
(Hungary) Katrin Klujber	≥11	
(Russia) Anna Kochetova	≥11	
(Socialist Federal Republic of Yugoslavia) / (Serbia) Milenka Lukić	≥11	
(Hungary) Ágnes Farkas	≥10	
(Romania) Mariana Tîrcă	≥10	
(Socialist Federal Republic of Yugoslavia) / (Austria) Jasna Kolar-Merdan	≥9	
(Russia) Anna Vyakhireva	≥8	
(Serbia) Andrea Lekić	≥8	
(Serbia) / (Hungary) Bojana Radulović	≥8	
(Germany) Grit Jurack	≥6	
(Czech Republic) Iveta Luzumová	≥6	
(Czech Republic) Markéta Jeřábková	≥6	
(Lithuania) / (Austria) Ausra Fridrikas	≥5	
(Norway) Linn-Kristin Riegelhuth	≥5	
(Socialist Federal Republic of Yugoslavia) / (Serbia) Svetlana Kitić	≥5	
(Hungary) Magdolna Oszvald	≥5	
(Netherlands) Dione Housheer	≥4	
(France) Sarah Bouktit	≥4	
(Portugal) / (Spain) Danila So Delgado	≥4	
(Brazil) Alexandra do Nascimento	≥4	

=== Players with the most Champions League titles ===
bold - active players

Players	Titles	Winning years and clubs	
Players	Titles	#	List
(Soviet Union) / (Ukraine) Zinaida Turchyna	13	1	Spartak Kyiv 1970, 1971, 1972, 1973, 1975, 1977, 1979, 1981, 1983, 1985, 1986, 1987, 1988
(Soviet Union) / (Ukraine) / (Austria) Nataliya Rusnachenko	9 or 10	2	Spartak Kyiv 1986, 1987, 1988, Hypo Niederösterreich 1990(??), 1992, 1993, 1994, 1995, 1998, 2000
(Soviet Union) / (Ukraine) Larysa Karlova	8	1	Spartak Kyiv 1977, 1979, 1981, 1983, 1985, 1986, 1987, 1988
(Norway) Katrine Lunde	7	3	Viborg 2009, 2010, Győri ETO KC 2013, 2014, Vipers Kristiansand 2021, 2022, 2023
(Hungary) / (Austria) Marianna Racz	7	2	Vasas Budapest 1982, Hypo Niederösterreich 1989, 1990, 1992, 1993, 1994, 1995
(Socialist Federal Republic of Yugoslavia) / (Austria) Stanka Božović	7	1	Hypo Niederösterreich 1990, 1992, 1993, 1994, 1995, 1998, 2000
(Soviet Union) / (Ukraine) Nataliya Tymoshkina	7	1	Spartak Kyiv 1970, 1971, 1972, 1973, 1975, 1977, 1979
(Norway) **Nora Mørk**	6	3	Larvik HK 2011, Győri ETO KC 2017, 2018, 2019, Vipers Kristiansand 2021, 2022
(Montenegro) Bojana Popović	6	3	Slagelse FH 2004, 2005, 2007, Viborg HK 2009, 2010, ŽRK Budućnost 2012
(Lithuania) / (Austria) Ausra Fridrikas	6	2	Hypo Niederösterreich 1994, 1995, 1998, 2000, Slagelse FH 2004, 2005
(Czech Republic) Jana Knedlíková	6	2	Győri ETO KC 2017, 2018, 2019, Vipers Kristiansand 2021, 2022, 2023
(Soviet Union) / (Ukraine) Lyudmyla Poradnyk	6 or 7	1	Spartak Kyiv 1970(??), 1971, 1972, 1973, 1975, 1977, 1979
(Soviet Union) / (Ukraine) Olha Zubaryeva	6	1	Spartak Kyiv 1977, 1979, 1981, 1983, 1985, 1986
(Norway) Heidi Løke	5	3	Larvik HK 2011, Győri ETO KC 2013, 2014, 2017, Vipers Kristiansand 2021
(Brazil) Eduarda Amorim	5	1	Győri ETO KC 2013, 2014, 2017, 2018, 2019
(Hungary) Anita Görbicz	5	1	Győri ETO KC 2013, 2014, 2017, 2018, 2019
(Soviet Union) / (Ukraine) Nataliya Matryuk	5 or 7	1	Spartak Kyiv 1979(??), 1981, 1983, 1985, 1986, 1987, 1988(??)
(Soviet Union) / (Ukraine) Tetyana Kocherhina	5	1	Spartak Kyiv 1973, 1975, 1977, 1979, 1981
(Soviet Union) / (Ukraine) Marina Bazanova	5	1	Spartak Kyiv 1983, 1985, 1986, 1987, 1988
(Montenegro) Katarina Bulatovic	4	3	Slagelse 2007, Budućnost 2012, 2015, Győri ETO KC 2014
(Romania) Cristina Varzaru	4	2	Viborg 2006, 2009, 2010, Bucuresti 2016
(Hungary) Zsuzsanna Tomori	4	2	Győri ETO KC 2017, 2018, 2019, Vipers Kristiansand 2022
(Lithuania) / (Austria) Rima Sypkus	4	1	Hypo 1994, 1995, 1998, 2000
(Socialist Federal Republic of Yugoslavia) / (Austria) Jasna Kolar-Merdan	4	1	Hypo 1989, 1990, 1992, 1993
(Austria) Iris Morhammer	4	1	Hypo 1992, 1993, 1994, 1995
(Kazakhstan) / (Russia) / (Austria) Tanja Dshandshagava	4	1	Hypo 1994, 1995, 1998, 2000
(Hungary) Bernadett Bódi	4	1	Győri ETO KC 2014, 2017, 2018, 2019
(Hungary) **Csenge Fodor**	4	1	Győri ETO KC 2018, 2019, 2024, 2025
(Soviet Union) / (Ukraine) Lyubov Odynokova	3 or 4	1	Spartak Kyiv 1979(??), 1981, 1983, 1985

No player has won exactly 3 titles with 3 different clubs.
In Champions League era, first player to raise the trophy three times in a row was (Romania) Luminița Huțupan (2001-03).

=== Coaches with most titles ===
Coach	Titles	Clubs	
Coach	Titles	#	List
(Soviet Union) / (Ukraine) Ihor Turchyn	13	1	Spartak Kyiv 1970, 1971, 1972, 1973, 1975, 1977, 1979, 1981, 1983, 1985, 1986, 1987, 1988
(Austria) Gunnar Prokop	8	1	Hypo 1989, 1990, 1992, 1993, 1994, 1995, 1998, 2000
(Spain) Ambros Martin	4	1	Győri ETO KC 2013, 2014, 2017, 2018
(Croatia) Vinko Kandija	4	2	Radnički Belgrade 1976, 1980, Hypo 1989, 1990
(Norway) Ole Gustav Gjekstad	4	2	Larvik HK 2011, Vipers Kristiansand 2021, 2022, 2023
(Denmark) Anja Andersen	3	1	Slagelse DT 2004, 2005, 2007

==== As Player and Coach combined ====
Player/Coach	Titles	as Player		as Coach	
Player/Coach	Titles	#	List	#	List
(Spain) Ambros Martin	5	1	San Antonio 2001	4	Győri ETO KC 2013, 2014, 2017, 2018

== Participation details ==
Team	1961	1961–62	1962–63	1963–64	1964–65	1965–66	1966–67	1967–68	1968–69	1969–70	1970–71	1971–72	1972–73	1973–74	1974–75	1975–76	1976–77	1977–78	1978–79	1979–80	1980–81	1981–82	1982–83	1983–84	1984–85	1985–86	1986–87	1987–88	1988–89	1989–90	1990–91	1991–92	1992–93	1993–94	1994–95	1995–96	1996–97	1997–98	1998–99	1999–00	2000–01	2001–02	2002–03	2003–04	2004–05	2005–06	2006–07	2007–08	2008–09	2009–10	2010–11	2011–12	2012–13	2013–14	2014–15	2015–16	2016–17	2017–18	2018–19	2019–20	2020–21	2021–22	2022–23	2023–24	2024–25	2025–26	2026–27	Total Top 4
(Germany) 1. FC Nürnberg	•	•	•	•	•	•	•	•	NH	•	3rd	•	•	•	•	•	•	•	•	•	•	•	•	•	•	•	•	•	•	•	•	•	•	•	•	•	•	•	•	•	•	•	•	•	•	•	•	•	•	•	•	•	•	•	•	•	•	•	•	C	•	•	•	•	•	•		1
(Denmark) Aalborg DH	•	•	•	•	•	•	•	•	NH	•	•	•	•	•	•	•	•	•	•	•	•	•	•	•	•	•	•	•	•	•	•	•	•	•	•	•	•	•	•	•	•	•	•	•	•	4th	•	•	•	•	•	•	•	•	•	•	•	•	•	C	•	•	•	•	•	•		1
(Austria) Admira Wien	•	•	•	•	•	•	•	•	NH	•	•	•	•	•	•	3rd	•	•	•	•	•	•	•	•	•	•	•	•	•	•	•	•	•	•	•	•	•	•	•	•	•	•	•	•	•	•	•	•	•	•	•	•	•	•	•	•	•	•	•	C	•	•	•	•	•	•		1
(Hungary) Bakony Veszprém	•	•	•	•	•	•	•	•	NH	•	•	3rd	•	•	•	•	•	•	•	•	•	•	•	•	•	•	•	•	•	•	•	•	•	•	•	•	•	•	•	•	•	•	•	•	•	•	•	•	•	•	•	•	•	•	•	•	•	•	•	C	•	•	•	•	•	•		1
(Germany) Bayer Leverkusen	•	•	•	•	•	•	•	•	NH	•	•	•	•	•	•	•	•	•	•	•	•	•	3rd	2nd	•	•	•	•	•	•	•	•	•	•	•	•	•	•	•	•	•	•	•	•	•	•	•	•	•	•	•	•	•	•	•	•	•	•	•	C	•	•	•	•	•	•		2
(Spain) BM Sagunto	•	•	•	•	•	•	•	•	NH	•	•	•	•	•	•	•	•	•	•	•	•	•	•	•	•	•	•	•	•	•	•	•	•	•	•	•	•	•	•	•	•	•	•	•	•	3rd	•	•	•	•	•	•	•	•	•	•	•	•	•	C	•	•	•	•	•	•		1
(Czech Republic) Bohemians Prague	•	•	•	•	•	•	4th	•	NH	•	•	•	•	•	•	•	•	•	•	•	•	•	•	•	•	•	•	•	•	•	•	•	•	•	•	•	•	•	•	•	•	•	•	•	•	•	•	•	•	•	•	•	•	•	•	•	•	•	•	C	•	•	•	•	•	•		1
(France) Brest Bretagne Handball	•	•	•	•	•	•	•	•	NH	•	•	•	•	•	•	•	•	•	•	•	•	•	•	•	•	•	•	•	•	•	•	•	•	•	•	•	•	•	•	•	•	•	•	•	•	•	•	•	•	•	•	•	•	•	•	•	•	•	•	C	2nd	•	•	•	•	4th		2
(Montenegro) Budućnost Podgorica	•	•	•	•	•	•	•	•	NH	•	•	•	•	•	•	•	•	•	•	•	•	•	•	•	•	•	•	•	•	•	•	•	•	•	•	•	•	4th	4th	3rd	3rd	4th	•	•	•	•	•	•	•	•	3rd	1st	•	2nd	1st	4th	4th	•	•	C	•	•	•	•	•	•		11
(Montenegro) Budućnost Titograd	•	•	•	•	•	•	•	•	NH	•	•	•	•	•	•	•	•	•	•	•	•	•	•	•	•	4th	•	•	•	•	•	•	•	•	•	•	•	•	•	•	•	•	•	•	•	•	•	•	•	•	•	•	•	•	•	•	•	•	•	C	•	•	•	•	•	•		1
(Romania) Chimistul Râmnicu Vâlcea	•	•	•	•	•	•	•	•	NH	•	•	•	•	•	•	•	•	•	•	•	•	•	•	•	•	•	•	•	•	3rd	•	3rd	•	•	•	•	•	•	•	•	•	•	•	•	•	•	•	•	•	•	•	•	•	•	•	•	•	•	•	C	•	•	•	•	•	•		2
(Romania) CS Mureșul	•	•	•	•	•	•	•	•	NH	•	•	•	•	•	•	•	•	•	•	•	•	•	•	•	•	•	•	•	4th	•	•	•	•	•	•	•	•	•	•	•	•	•	•	•	•	•	•	•	•	•	•	•	•	•	•	•	•	•	•	C	•	•	•	•	•	•		1
(Russia) CSKA Moscow	•	•	•	•	•	•	•	•	NH	•	•	•	•	•	•	•	•	•	•	•	•	•	•	•	•	•	•	•	•	•	•	•	•	•	•	•	•	•	•	•	•	•	•	•	•	•	•	•	•	•	•	•	•	•	•	•	•	•	•	C	4th	•	•	•	•	•		1
(Romania) CSM București	•	•	•	•	•	•	•	•	NH	•	•	•	•	•	•	•	•	•	•	•	•	•	•	•	•	•	•	•	•	•	•	•	•	•	•	•	•	•	•	•	•	•	•	•	•	•	•	•	•	•	•	•	•	•	•	1st	3rd	3rd	•	C	•	•	•	•	•	3rd		4
(Hungary) Debreceni VSC	•	•	•	•	•	•	•	•	NH	•	•	•	•	•	•	•	•	•	•	•	•	•	•	•	•	•	•	•	3rd	•	•	•	•	•	•	•	•	•	•	•	•	•	•	•	•	•	•	•	•	•	•	•	•	•	•	•	•	•	•	C	•	•	•	•	•	•		1
(Russia) Dinamo Volgograd	•	•	•	•	•	•	•	•	NH	•	•	•	•	•	•	•	•	•	•	•	•	•	•	•	•	•	•	•	•	•	•	•	•	•	•	•	•	•	•	•	•	•	•	•	•	•	•	•	•	•	•	•	•	•	4th	•	•	•	•	C	•	•	•	•	•	•		1
(Hungary) Dunaferr NK	•	•	•	•	•	•	•	•	NH	•	•	•	•	•	•	•	•	•	•	•	•	•	•	•	•	•	•	•	•	•	•	•	•	•	•	•	•	•	1st	•	•	•	•	3rd	3rd	•	•	•	•	•	•	•	•	•	•	•	•	•	•	C	•	•	•	•	•	•		3
(Czech Republic) Dynamo Prague	2nd	•	•	•	•	•	•	•	NH	•	•	•	•	•	•	•	•	•	•	•	•	•	•	•	•	•	•	•	•	•	•	•	•	•	•	•	•	•	•	•	•	•	•	•	•	•	•	•	•	•	•	•	•	•	•	•	•	•	•	C	•	•	•	•	•	•		1
(Germany) Eimsbütteler TV	•	•	•	4th	•	•	•	•	NH	•	•	•	•	•	•	•	•	•	•	•	•	•	•	•	•	•	•	•	•	•	•	•	•	•	•	•	•	•	•	•	•	•	•	•	•	•	•	•	•	•	•	•	•	•	•	•	•	•	•	C	•	•	•	•	•	•		1
(Germany) Eintracht Minden	•	•	•	•	•	•	•	•	NH	•	•	•	•	3rd	•	•	•	•	3rd	•	•	•	•	•	•	•	•	•	•	•	•	•	•	•	•	•	•	•	•	•	•	•	•	•	•	•	•	•	•	•	•	•	•	•	•	•	•	•	•	C	•	•	•	•	•	•		2
(Germany) Empor Rostock	•	•	•	•	•	•	•	2nd	NH	•	•	•	•	•	•	•	•	•	•	•	•	•	•	•	•	•	•	•	•	•	•	•	•	•	•	•	•	•	•	•	•	•	•	•	•	•	•	•	•	•	•	•	•	•	•	•	•	•	•	C	•	•	•	•	•	•		1
(Denmark) FC Midtjylland	•	•	•	•	•	•	•	•	NH	•	•	•	•	•	•	•	•	•	•	•	•	•	•	•	•	•	•	•	•	•	•	•	•	•	•	•	•	•	•	•	•	•	•	•	•	•	•	•	•	•	•	•	•	4th	•	•	•	•	•	C	•	•	•	•	•	•		1
(Hungary) Ferencvárosi TC	•	•	•	•	•	•	•	•	NH	•	2nd	•	•	•	•	•	•	•	•	•	•	•	•	•	•	•	•	•	•	•	•	•	•	•	•	4th	4th	•	•	•	4th	2nd	•	•	•	•	•	•	•	•	•	•	•	•	•	•	•	•	•	C	•	•	2nd	•	•	•		6
(Germany) Fortschritt Weissenfels	•	•	3rd	•	•	•	•	•	NH	•	•	•	•	•	•	•	•	•	•	•	•	•	•	•	•	•	•	•	•	•	•	•	•	•	•	•	•	•	•	•	•	•	•	•	•	•	•	•	•	•	•	•	•	•	•	•	•	•	•	C	•	•	•	•	•	•		1
(Denmark) Frederiksberg IF	•	•	2nd	•	•	•	•	•	NH	•	•	•	•	•	•	•	•	•	•	•	•	•	•	•	•	•	•	•	•	•	•	•	•	•	•	•	•	•	•	•	•	•	•	•	•	•	•	•	•	•	•	•	•	•	•	•	•	•	•	C	•	•	•	•	•	•		1
(Hungary) Győri Audi ETO KC	•	•	•	•	•	•	•	•	NH	•	•	•	•	•	•	•	•	•	•	•	•	•	•	•	•	•	•	•	•	•	•	•	•	•	•	•	•	•	•	•	•	•	•	•	•	•	3rd	3rd	2nd	3rd	4th	2nd	1st	1st	•	2nd	1st	1st	1st	C	3rd	2nd	3rd	1st	1st	2nd		18
(North Macedonia) HC Vardar	•	•	•	•	•	•	•	•	NH	•	•	•	•	•	•	•	•	•	•	•	•	•	•	•	•	•	•	•	•	•	•	•	•	•	•	•	•	•	•	•	•	•	•	•	•	•	•	•	•	•	•	•	•	3rd	3rd	3rd	2nd	2nd	•	C	•	•	•	•	•	•		5
(Denmark) Helsingør IF	•	•	•	2nd	•	•	•	•	NH	•	•	•	•	•	•	•	•	•	•	•	•	•	•	•	•	•	•	•	•	•	•	•	•	•	•	•	•	•	•	•	•	•	•	•	•	•	•	•	•	•	•	•	•	•	•	•	•	•	•	C	•	•	•	•	•	•		1
(Denmark) HG København	•	•	•	•	1st	2nd	•	•	NH	4th	4th	•	•	•	•	•	•	•	•	•	•	•	•	•	•	•	•	•	•	•	•	•	•	•	•	•	•	•	•	•	•	•	•	•	•	•	•	•	•	•	•	•	•	•	•	•	•	•	•	C	•	•	•	•	•	•		4
(Austria) Hypo Niederösterreich	•	•	•	•	•	•	•	•	NH	•	•	•	•	•	•	•	•	•	•	•	•	•	•	3rd	4th	•	2nd	2nd	1st	1st	2nd	1st	1st	1st	1st	2nd	3rd	1st	3rd	1st	•	•	•	•	4th	•	4th	2nd	4th	•	•	•	•	•	•	•	•	•	•	C	•	•	•	•	•	•		20
(Romania) IEFS București	•	•	•	•	•	•	•	•	NH	•	•	•	•	•	3rd	•	•	•	•	•	•	•	•	•	•	•	•	•	•	•	•	•	•	•	•	•	•	•	•	•	•	•	•	•	•	•	•	•	•	•	•	•	•	•	•	•	•	•	•	C	•	•	•	•	•	•		1
(Denmark) Ikast EH	•	•	•	•	•	•	•	•	NH	•	•	•	•	•	•	•	•	•	•	•	•	•	•	•	•	•	•	•	•	•	•	•	•	•	•	•	•	•	•	•	•	•	3rd	•	•	•	•	•	•	•	•	•	•	•	•	•	•	•	•	C	•	•	•	•	•	•		1
(Norway) IL Vestar	•	•	•	•	•	•	•	•	NH	•	•	•	•	•	•	•	4th	3rd	•	•	•	•	•	•	•	•	•	•	•	•	•	•	•	•	•	•	•	•	•	•	•	•	•	•	•	•	•	•	•	•	•	•	•	•	•	•	•	•	•	C	•	•	•	•	•	•		2
(Slovakia) Inter Bratislava	•	•	•	•	•	•	•	•	NH	•	•	•	•	•	•	•	•	•	•	2nd	•	•	•	•	•	•	•	•	•	•	•	•	•	•	•	•	•	•	•	•	•	•	•	•	•	•	•	•	•	•	•	•	•	•	•	•	•	•	•	C	•	•	•	•	•	•		1
(North Macedonia) Kometal Gjorče Petrov	•	•	•	•	•	•	•	•	NH	•	•	•	•	•	•	•	•	•	•	•	•	•	•	•	•	•	•	•	•	•	•	•	•	•	•	•	•	•	•	2nd	•	1st	•	•	2nd	•	•	•	•	•	•	•	•	•	•	•	•	•	•	C	•	•	•	•	•	•		3
(Slovenia) Krim Ljubljana	•	•	•	•	•	•	•	•	NH	•	•	•	•	•	•	•	•	•	•	•	•	•	•	•	•	•	•	•	•	•	•	•	•	•	•	•	•	•	2nd	•	1st	•	1st	2nd	•	2nd	•	•	•	•	•	•	4th	•	•	•	•	•	•	C	•	•	•	•	•	•		6
(Poland) KS Cracovia	•	•	•	•	•	•	•	3rd	NH	•	•	•	•	•	•	•	•	•	•	•	•	•	•	•	•	•	•	•	•	•	•	•	•	•	•	•	•	•	•	•	•	•	•	•	•	•	•	•	•	•	•	•	•	•	•	•	•	•	•	C	•	•	•	•	•	•		1
(Russia) Kuban Krasnodar	•	•	•	•	•	•	•	•	NH	•	•	•	•	•	•	•	•	•	•	•	•	•	•	•	•	•	•	•	•	2nd	•	•	•	•	•	•	•	•	•	•	•	•	•	•	•	•	•	•	•	•	•	•	•	•	•	•	•	•	•	C	•	•	•	•	•	•		1
(Russia) Lada Togliatti	•	•	•	•	•	•	•	•	NH	•	•	•	•	•	•	•	•	•	•	•	•	•	•	•	•	•	•	•	•	•	•	•	•	•	•	•	•	•	•	•	•	•	•	•	•	•	2nd	4th	•	•	•	•	•	•	•	•	•	•	•	C	•	•	•	•	•	•		2
(Norway) Larvik HK	•	•	•	•	•	•	•	•	NH	•	•	•	•	•	•	•	•	•	•	•	•	•	•	•	•	•	•	•	•	•	•	•	•	•	•	•	•	•	•	•	•	3rd	•	4th	•	•	•	•	•	4th	1st	4th	2nd	•	2nd	•	•	•	•	C	•	•	•	•	•	•		7
(Croatia) Lokomotiva Zagreb	•	•	•	•	4th	•	•	•	NH	•	•	•	•	•	2nd	•	•	•	•	•	•	•	•	•	•	•	•	•	•	•	•	•	•	•	•	•	•	•	•	•	•	•	•	•	•	•	•	•	•	•	•	•	•	•	•	•	•	•	•	C	•	•	•	•	•	•		2
(Spain) Mar Valencia	•	•	•	•	•	•	•	•	NH	•	•	•	•	•	•	•	•	•	•	•	•	•	•	•	•	•	•	•	•	•	•	•	3rd	3rd	3rd	3rd	1st	2nd	•	•	•	•	2nd	•	•	•	•	•	•	•	•	•	•	•	•	•	•	•	•	C	•	•	•	•	•	•		7
(France) Metz Handball	•	•	•	•	•	•	•	•	NH	•	•	•	•	•	•	•	•	•	•	•	•	•	•	•	•	•	•	•	•	•	•	•	•	•	•	•	•	•	•	•	•	•	•	•	•	•	•	•	•	•	•	•	•	•	•	•	•	•	4th	C	•	3rd	•	4th	4th	1st		5
(Netherlands) NILOC Amsterdam	•	•	•	•	•	•	•	•	NH	•	•	•	3rd	•	•	•	•	•	•	•	•	•	•	•	•	•	•	•	•	•	•	•	•	•	•	•	•	•	•	•	•	•	•	•	•	•	•	•	•	•	•	•	•	•	•	•	•	•	•	C	•	•	•	•	•	•		1
(Denmark) Odense Håndbold	•	•	•	•	•	•	•	•	NH	•	•	•	•	•	•	•	•	•	•	•	•	•	•	•	•	•	•	•	•	•	•	•	•	•	•	•	•	•	•	•	•	•	•	•	•	•	•	•	•	•	•	•	•	•	•	•	•	•	•	C	•	•	•	•	2nd	•		1
(Romania) Oltchim Râmnicu Vâlcea	•	•	•	•	•	•	•	•	NH	•	•	•	•	•	•	•	•	•	•	•	•	•	•	•	•	•	•	•	•	•	•	•	•	•	•	•	•	•	•	•	•	•	•	•	•	•	•	•	3rd	2nd	•	3rd	3rd	•	•	•	•	•	•	C	•	•	•	•	•	•		4
(Serbia) ORK Belgrade	•	2nd	•	•	•	•	•	•	NH	•	•	•	•	•	•	•	•	•	•	•	•	•	•	•	•	•	•	•	•	•	•	•	•	•	•	•	•	•	•	•	•	•	•	•	•	•	•	•	•	•	•	•	•	•	•	•	•	•	•	C	•	•	•	•	•	•		1
(Croatia) Podravka Koprivnica	•	•	•	•	•	•	•	•	NH	•	•	•	•	•	•	•	•	•	•	•	•	•	•	•	•	•	•	•	•	•	•	•	•	•	2nd	1st	•	3rd	•	•	•	•	•	•	•	•	•	•	•	•	•	•	•	•	•	•	•	•	•	C	•	•	•	•	•	•		3
(Serbia) Radnički Belgrade	•	•	•	•	•	•	•	•	NH	•	•	•	•	4th	•	1st	3rd	•	•	1st	2nd	2nd	2nd	1st	2nd	•	•	4th	•	•	•	•	•	•	•	•	•	•	•	•	•	•	•	•	•	•	•	•	•	•	•	•	•	•	•	•	•	•	•	C	•	•	•	•	•	•		10
(Romania) Rapid București	•	•	4th	1st	•	•	•	4th	NH	•	•	•	•	•	•	•	•	•	•	•	•	•	•	•	•	•	•	•	•	•	•	•	•	•	•	•	•	•	•	•	•	•	•	•	•	•	•	•	•	•	•	•	•	•	•	•	•	•	•	C	•	•	•	•	•	•		3
(Croatia) RK Osijek	•	•	•	•	•	•	•	•	NH	•	•	•	•	•	•	•	•	•	•	•	4th	•	•	•	•	•	•	•	•	•	•	•	•	•	•	•	•	•	•	•	•	•	•	•	•	•	•	•	•	•	•	•	•	•	•	•	•	•	•	C	•	•	•	•	•	•		1
(Russia) Rostov-Don	•	•	•	•	•	•	•	•	NH	•	•	•	•	•	•	•	•	•	•	•	•	•	•	•	•	•	•	•	•	•	•	•	•	•	•	•	•	•	•	•	•	•	•	•	•	•	•	•	•	•	•	•	•	•	•	•	•	4th	2nd	C	•	•	•	•	•	•		2
(Russia) Rostselmash	•	•	•	•	•	•	•	•	NH	•	•	•	•	•	•	•	•	•	•	•	•	•	•	•	•	•	•	•	•	•	3rd	•	•	•	•	•	•	•	•	•	•	•	•	•	•	•	•	•	•	•	•	•	•	•	•	•	•	•	•	C	•	•	•	•	•	•		1
(Germany) RSF Mülheim	4th	3rd	•	•	•	•	•	•	NH	•	•	•	•	•	•	•	•	•	•	•	•	•	•	•	•	•	•	•	•	•	•	•	•	•	•	•	•	•	•	•	•	•	•	•	•	•	•	•	•	•	•	•	•	•	•	•	•	•	•	C	•	•	•	•	•	•		2
(Poland) Ruch Chorzów	•	•	•	•	•	•	•	•	NH	•	•	•	•	•	•	•	•	4th	•	•	•	•	•	•	•	•	•	•	•	•	•	•	•	•	•	•	•	•	•	•	•	•	•	•	•	•	•	•	•	•	•	•	•	•	•	•	•	•	•	C	•	•	•	•	•	•		1
(Romania) Rulmentul Brașov	•	•	•	•	•	•	•	•	NH	•	•	•	•	•	•	•	•	•	•	•	•	4th	•	•	•	•	•	•	•	•	•	•	•	•	•	•	•	•	•	•	•	•	•	•	•	•	•	•	•	•	•	•	•	•	•	•	•	•	•	C	•	•	•	•	•	•		1
(Switzerland) SC Brühl	•	•	•	•	•	•	•	•	NH	•	•	•	•	•	•	•	•	•	•	•	•	•	•	•	•	•	•	•	•	4th	•	•	•	•	•	•	•	•	•	•	•	•	•	•	•	•	•	•	•	•	•	•	•	•	•	•	•	•	•	C	•	•	•	•	•	•		1
(Germany) SC Leipzig	•	•	•	•	•	1st	2nd	•	NH	2nd	•	2nd	4th	1st	•	•	2nd	•	4th	•	•	•	•	•	3rd	•	•	•	•	•	•	•	•	•	•	•	•	•	•	•	•	•	•	•	•	•	•	•	•	•	•	•	•	•	•	•	•	•	•	C	•	•	•	•	•	•		9
(Spain) SD Itxako	•	•	•	•	•	•	•	•	NH	•	•	•	•	•	•	•	•	•	•	•	•	•	•	•	•	•	•	•	•	•	•	•	•	•	•	•	•	•	•	•	•	•	•	•	•	•	•	•	•	•	2nd	•	•	•	•	•	•	•	•	C	•	•	•	•	•	•		1
(Germany) SG BBM Bietigheim	•	•	•	•	•	•	•	•	NH	•	•	•	•	•	•	•	•	•	•	•	•	•	•	•	•	•	•	•	•	•	•	•	•	•	•	•	•	•	•	•	•	•	•	•	•	•	•	•	•	•	•	•	•	•	•	•	•	•	•	C	•	•	•	2nd	•	•		1
(Denmark) Slagelse FH	•	•	•	•	•	•	•	•	NH	•	•	•	•	•	•	•	•	•	•	•	•	•	•	•	•	•	•	•	•	•	•	•	•	•	•	•	•	•	•	•	•	•	•	1st	1st	•	1st	•	•	•	•	•	•	•	•	•	•	•	•	C	•	•	•	•	•	•		3
(Czech Republic) Sparta Prague	•	1st	•	•	•	4th	•	•	NH	•	•	•	•	•	•	•	•	•	•	•	•	•	•	•	•	•	•	•	•	•	•	•	•	•	•	•	•	•	•	•	•	•	•	•	•	•	•	•	•	•	•	•	•	•	•	•	•	•	•	C	•	•	•	•	•	•		2
(Hungary) Spartacus Budapest	•	•	•	3rd	2nd	3rd	•	•	NH	•	•	•	•	•	•	•	•	•	•	•	•	•	•	•	•	•	•	3rd	•	•	•	•	•	•	•	•	•	•	•	•	•	•	•	•	•	•	•	•	•	•	•	•	•	•	•	•	•	•	•	C	•	•	•	•	•	•		4
(Ukraine) Spartak Kyiv	•	•	•	•	•	•	•	•	NH	1st	1st	1st	1st	2nd	1st	•	1st	•	1st	•	1st	3rd	1st	•	1st	1st	1st	1st	2nd	•	•	•	•	•	•	•	•	•	•	•	•	•	•	•	•	•	•	•	•	•	•	•	•	•	•	•	•	•	•	C	•	•	•	•	•	•		16
(Sweden) Stockholmspolisens IF	•	•	•	•	•	•	•	•	NH	•	•	•	•	•	•	4th	•	•	•	3rd	•	•	•	•	•	•	•	•	•	•	•	•	•	•	•	•	•	•	•	•	•	•	•	•	•	•	•	•	•	•	•	•	•	•	•	•	•	•	•	C	•	•	•	•	•	•		2
(Netherlands) Swift Roermond	•	•	•	•	3rd	•	•	•	NH	•	•	•	•	•	•	2nd	•	•	•	•	•	•	•	•	•	•	•	•	•	•	•	•	•	•	•	•	•	•	•	•	•	•	•	•	•	•	•	•	•	•	•	•	•	•	•	•	•	•	•	C	•	•	•	•	•	•		2
(Denmark) Team Esbjerg	•	•	•	•	•	•	•	•	NH	•	•	•	•	•	•	•	•	•	•	•	•	•	•	•	•	•	•	•	•	•	•	•	•	•	•	•	•	•	•	•	•	•	•	•	•	•	•	•	•	•	•	•	•	•	•	•	•	•	•	C	•	4th	4th	3rd	3rd	•		4
(Russia) Trud Moscow	•	•	1st	•	•	•	•	•	NH	•	•	•	•	•	•	•	•	•	•	•	•	•	•	•	•	•	•	•	•	•	•	•	•	•	•	•	•	•	•	•	•	•	•	•	•	•	•	•	•	•	•	•	•	•	•	•	•	•	•	C	•	•	•	•	•	•		1
(Germany) TSC Berlin	•	•	•	•	•	•	•	•	NH	•	•	•	•	•	•	•	•	1st	•	•	•	•	•	•	•	•	•	•	•	•	•	•	•	•	•	•	•	•	•	•	•	•	•	•	•	•	•	•	•	•	•	•	•	•	•	•	•	•	•	C	•	•	•	•	•	•		1
(Germany) TV Giessen-Lützellinden	•	•	•	•	•	•	•	•	NH	•	•	•	•	•	•	•	•	•	•	•	•	•	•	•	•	•	•	•	•	•	1st	2nd	•	4th	•	•	•	•	•	•	•	•	•	•	•	•	•	•	•	•	•	•	•	•	•	•	•	•	•	C	•	•	•	•	•	•		3
(Romania) Universitatea București	•	•	•	•	•	•	•	•	NH	•	•	4th	•	•	•	•	•	•	•	•	•	•	•	•	•	•	•	•	•	•	•	•	•	•	•	•	•	•	•	•	•	•	•	•	•	•	•	•	•	•	•	•	•	•	•	•	•	•	•	C	•	•	•	•	•	•		1
(Romania) Universitatea Timișoara	•	•	•	•	•	•	3rd	•	NH	•	•	•	2nd	•	•	•	•	•	•	•	•	•	•	•	•	•	•	•	•	•	•	•	•	•	•	•	•	•	•	•	•	•	•	•	•	•	•	•	•	•	•	•	•	•	•	•	•	•	•	C	•	•	•	•	•	•		2
(Hungary) Vasas Budapest	•	•	•	•	•	•	•	•	NH	•	•	•	•	•	4th	•	•	2nd	2nd	•	•	1st	4th	4th	•	3rd	•	•	•	•	•	•	2nd	2nd	•	•	•	•	•	•	•	•	•	•	•	•	•	•	•	•	•	•	•	•	•	•	•	•	•	C	•	•	•	•	•	•		9
(Denmark) Viborg HK	•	•	•	•	•	•	•	•	NH	•	•	•	•	•	•	•	•	•	•	•	•	•	•	•	•	•	•	•	•	•	•	•	•	•	•	•	2nd	•	•	•	2nd	•	4th	•	•	1st	•	•	1st	1st	•	•	•	•	•	•	•	•	•	C	•	•	•	•	•	•		6
(Bulgaria) VIG G. Dimitrov	•	•	•	•	•	•	•	•	NH	•	•	•	•	•	•	•	•	•	•	4th	3rd	•	•	•	•	•	•	•	•	•	•	•	•	•	•	•	•	•	•	•	•	•	•	•	•	•	•	•	•	•	•	•	•	•	•	•	•	•	•	C	•	•	•	•	•	•		2
(Norway) Vipers Kristiansand	•	•	•	•	•	•	•	•	NH	•	•	•	•	•	•	•	•	•	•	•	•	•	•	•	•	•	•	•	•	•	•	•	•	•	•	•	•	•	•	•	•	•	•	•	•	•	•	•	•	•	•	•	•	•	•	•	•	•	3rd	C	1st	1st	1st	•	•	•		4
(Russia) Volgograd Akva	•	•	•	•	•	•	•	•	NH	•	•	•	•	•	•	•	•	•	•	•	•	•	•	•	•	•	•	•	•	•	•	•	•	•	•	•	•	•	•	4th	•	•	•	•	•	•	•	•	•	•	•	•	•	•	•	•	•	•	•	C	•	•	•	•	•	•		1
(Germany) Walle Bremen	•	•	•	•	•	•	•	•	NH	•	•	•	•	•	•	•	•	•	•	•	•	•	•	•	•	•	•	•	•	•	•	4th	4th	•	4th	•	•	•	•	•	•	•	•	•	•	•	•	•	•	•	•	•	•	•	•	•	•	•	•	C	•	•	•	•	•	•		3
(Russia) Zvezda Zvenigorod	•	•	•	•	•	•	•	•	NH	•	•	•	•	•	•	•	•	•	•	•	•	•	•	•	•	•	•	•	•	•	•	•	•	•	•	•	•	•	•	•	•	•	•	•	•	•	•	1st	•	•	•	•	•	•	•	•	•	•	•	C	•	•	•	•	•	•		1
(Slovakia) ZVL Prešov	•	•	•	•	•	•	•	•	NH	•	•	•	•	•	•	•	•	•	•	•	•	•	•	•	•	•	4th	•	•	•	•	•	•	•	•	•	•	•	•	•	•	•	•	•	•	•	•	•	•	•	•	•	•	•	•	•	•	•	•	C	•	•	•	•	•	•		1
(Hungary) Építők SC	•	•	•	•	•	•	•	•	NH	•	•	•	•	•	•	•	•	•	•	•	•	•	•	•	•	•	•	•	•	•	4th	•	•	•	•	•	•	•	•	•	•	•	•	•	•	•	•	•	•	•	•	•	•	•	•	•	•	•	•	C	•	•	•	•	•	•		1
(Lithuania) Žalgiris Kaunas	3rd	•	•	•	•	•	1st	1st	NH	3rd	•	•	•	•	•	•	•	•	•	•	•	•	•	•	•	•	•	•	•	•	•	•	•	•	•	•	•	•	•	•	•	•	•	•	•	•	•	•	•	•	•	•	•	•	•	•	•	•	•	C	•	•	•	•	•	•		4
(Romania) Știința Bacău	•	•	•	•	•	•	•	•	NH	•	•	•	•	•	•	•	•	•	•	•	•	•	•	•	•	2nd	3rd	•	•	•	•	•	•	•	•	•	•	•	•	•	•	•	•	•	•	•	•	•	•	•	•	•	•	•	•	•	•	•	•	C	•	•	•	•	•	•		2
(Romania) Știința București	1st	4th	•	•	•	•	•	•	NH	•	•	•	•	•	•	•	•	•	•	•	•	•	•	•	•	•	•	•	•	•	•	•	•	•	•	•	•	•	•	•	•	•	•	•	•	•	•	•	•	•	•	•	•	•	•	•	•	•	•	C	•	•	•	•	•	•		2
Total	4	4	4	4	4	4	4	4	0	4	4	4	4	4	4	4	4	4	4	4	4	4	4	4	4	4	4	4	4	4	4	4	4	4	4	4	4	4	4	4	4	4	4	4	4	4	4	4	4	4	4	4	4	4	4	4	4	4	4	0	4	4	4	4	4	4	0	

Champion
Runner-up
Third place / losing semifinalist
Fourth place / losing semifinalist

Notes: NH = competition not held; C = season cancelled. This table records the four finalists/semifinalists listed for each edition, not every club that entered the competition. The 2026–27 column remains blank until the edition is completed.

=== All-time table for semi-finalists and clubs with at least 10 participations in the main tournament ===
As of the end of the 2025/26 season
Defunct clubs
Total participations - includes unsuccessful participations in qualifications for the main tournament in addition to participations in the main tournament.

Country	Team	Main tournament										Total (Main + Qual.)						Qualifications	
Country	Team	Part.	F	Top4	F4	Pld	W	D	L	Gs	1st Ssn	Tot. Part.	Pld	W	D	L	Gs	Ent.	Q
(Germany) GER	1. FC Nürnberg		0	1	0														
(Austria) AUT	Admira Wien		0	1	0														
(Denmark) DEN	Aalborg DH		0	1	0														
(Germany) GER	Bayer 04 Leverkusen		1	2	0														
(Serbia) SRB	Belgrade		1	1	0														
(Germany) GER	Berliner TSC		1	1	0														
(Czech Republic) CZE	Bohemians Prague		0	1	0														
(France) FRA	Brest		1	2	2														
(Switzerland) SWI	Brühl		0	1	0														
(Montenegro) MNE	Budućnost Podgorica	31	3	12	4	348													
(Romania) ROM	Corona Brașov/Rulmentul Brașov		0	1	0														
(Poland) POL	Cracovia		0	1	0														
(Russia) RUS	CSKA Moscow		0	1	1														
(Romania) ROM	CSM București	11	1	4	4														
(Hungary) HUN	Debreceni VSC		0	1	0														
(Russia) RUS	Dinamo Volgograd		0	2	1														
(Hungary) HUN	Dunaferr		1	3	0														
(Germany) GER	Eimsbütteler TV		0	1	0														
(Germany) GER	Eintracht Minden		0	2	0														
(Germany) GER	Empor Rostock		1	1	0														
(Hungary) HUN	Építők SC		0	1	0														
(Denmark) DEN	Esbjerg	8	0	4	4														
(Hungary) HUN	Ferencvárosi TC	24	2	6	1														
(Denmark) DEN	Frederiksberg		1	1	0														
(Hungary) HUN	Győri ETO	22	12	18	11														
(Denmark) DEN	Helsingør		1	1	0														
(Austria) AUT	Hypo NÖ		13	20	0														
(Romania) ROM	IEFS București		0	1	0														
(Denmark) DEN	Ikast		0	2	1														
(Slovakia) SVK	Inter Bratislava		1	1	0														
(Spain) ESP	Itxako		1	1	0														
(North Macedonia) NMK	Kometal GP Skopje		3	3	0														
(Denmark) DEN	København		2	4	0														
(Slovenia) SLO	Krim Ljubljana	31	5	6	0														
(Russia) RUS	Kuban Krasnodar		1	1	0														
(Russia) RUS	Lada Togliatti		1	2	0														
(Norway) NOR	Larvik		3	7	1														
(Germany) GER	Leipzig		6	9	0														
(Croatia) CRO	Lokomotiva Zagreb		1	2	0														
(Russia) RUS	Luch Moscow/Trud Moscow		1	1	0														
(Germany) GER	Ludwigsburg/BBM Bietigheim		1	1	1														
(Germany) GER	Lützellinden 1904/Giessen-Lützellinden		2	3	0														
(France) FRA	Metz	19	1	5	5														
(Germany) GER	Mulheim		0	2	0														
(Netherlands) NED	NILOC Amsterdam		0	1	0														
(Denmark) DEN	Odense	7	1	1	1														
(Croatia) CRO	Osijek		0	1	0														
(Romania) ROM	Oltchim Râmnicu Vâlcea/Chimistul Râmnicu Vâlcea		1	6	0														
(Croatia) CRO	Podravka Koprivnica	24	2	3	0														
(Serbia) SRB	Radnički Belgrade		7	10	0														
(Romania) ROM	Rapid București		1	3	0														
(Russia) RUS	Rostov-Don/Rostselmash		1	3	2														
(Poland) POL	Ruch Chorzów		0	1	0														
(Spain) ESP	Sagunto/Mar Valencia		3	8	0														
(Denmark) DEN	Slagelse		3	3	0														
(Czech Republic) CZE	Slavia Prague/Dynamo Prague		1	1	0														
(Czech Republic) CZE	Sparta Prague		1	2	0														
(Hungary) HUN	Spartacus Budapest		1	4	0														
(Ukraine) UKR	Spartak Kyiv		15	16	0														
(Romania) ROM	Știința Bacău		1	2	0														
(Sweden) SWE	Stockholmspolisens		0	2	0														
(Netherlands) NED	Swift Roermond		1	2	0														
(Romania) ROM	Universitatea Știința București		1	3	0														
(Romania) ROM	Universitatea Timișoara/Știința Timișoara		1	2	0														
(North Macedonia) NMK	Vardar Skopje		2	5	5														
(Hungary) HUN	Vasas Budapest		5	9	0														
(Norway) NOR	Vestar		0	2	0														
(Hungary) HUN	Veszprém		0	1	0														
(Denmark) DEN	Viborg		5	6	0														
(Bulgaria) BUL	VIF G. Dimitrov Sofia		0	2	0														
(Norway) NOR	Vipers Kristiansand		3	4	4														
(Germany) GER	Walle Bremen		0	3	0														
(Germany) GER	Weissenfelser HV 91		0	1	0														
(Russia) RUS	Zvezda Zvenigorod		1	1	0														
(Slovakia) SVK	ZVL Prešov		0	1	0														
(Lithuania) LTU	Žalgiris Kaunas		2	4	0														
	[[]]		0	0	0														

== See also ==
- EHF Champions League
- Women's EHF European League
