= Cracovia (handball) =

Polish handball club

KS Cracovia 1906
- Full name: Klub Sportowy Cracovia 1906
- Short name: Cracovia
- Founded: 1926; 99 years ago
- Club colours

KS Cracovia is a Polish women's handball team from Kraków. It is a section of the KS Cracovia multi-sports club.

Cracovia enjoyed its golden era between 1957 and 1961, winning four national championships. A founding member of the European Cup in 1961, its major success in the competition was reaching the semifinals in 1968 after winning its fifth championship. Cracovia won four further titles in the second half of the 1980s, but it subsequently declined. In the 2021–22 season it played in the I liga, finishing seventh.

== Titles ==
- 7 Polish Championships
  - 1957, 1958, 1960, 1961, 1977, 1985, 1987
- 2 Polish Cup
  - 1985, 1988
