= Debreceni VSC in European handball =

Debreceni VSC is a Hungarian handball club, based in Debrecen, Hungary.

== European record ==
As of 30 June 2025

In bold, we indicate the cup winning.

Competition	Seasons	Year(s) in the competition
EHF Champions League (Champions Cup)	**5x**	1988–89, 2010–11, 2011–12, 2023–24, 2025–26
EHF European League (IHF Cup, EHF Cup)	**20x**	1985–86, 1987–88, 1992–93, 1993–94, **1994–95**, **1995–96**, 1996–97, 1998–99, 1999–2000, 2000–01, 2002–03, 2005–06, 2006–07, 2016–17, 2017–18, 2019–20, 2020–21, 2021–22, 2022–23, 2024–25
EHF Challenge Cup (City Cup)	**1x**	1997–98
EHF Cup Winners' Cup (defunct)	**9x**	1986–87, 1989–90, 1990–91, 1991–92, 2002, 2007–08, 2008–09, 2009–10, 2011–12
Total	34x	Source: kézitörténelem.hu

== EHF-organised seasonal competitions ==
Debreceni VSC score listed first. As of 30 June 2025.

=== European Cup and Champions League ===
Season	Round	Club	Home	Away	Agg/Pos.
1988–89	First round	(Hungary) Bp. Spartacus	**bye**		
1988–89	Round of 16	(Bulgaria) VIF Dimitrov Sofia	35–19	28–24	**63–43**
1988–89	Quarter-finals	(West Germany) TV Lützellinden	20–22	22–18	**42–40**
1988–89	Semi-finals	(Austria) Hypobank Südstadt	24–29	15–20	**39–49**
2010–11	Second qualification tournament (Group 2)	(Denmark) KIF Vejen	31–20		1st
2010–11	Second qualification tournament (Group 2)	(Poland) SPR Lublin SSA	29–26		1st
2010–11	Second qualification tournament (Group 2)	(Serbia) RK Zaječar	25–24		1st
2010–11	Group stage (Group B)	(Austria) Hypo Niederösterreich	22–21	26–28	4th
2010–11	Group stage (Group B)	(Germany) HC Leipzig	19–20	25–31	4th
2010–11	Group stage (Group B)	(Spain) Itxako Reyno de Navarra	27–32	24–39	4th
2011–12	Second qualification tournament (Group 3)	(Portugal) CDE Gil Eanes	35–22		2nd CWC
2011–12	Second qualification tournament (Group 3)	(Germany) Buxtehuder SV	26–30		2nd CWC
2023–24	Group stage (Group A)				
2023–24	Group stage (Group A)	(Romania) CSM București	23–30	29–29	5th
2023–24	Group stage (Group A)	(Hungary) Győri ETO KC	29–28	35–23	5th
2023–24	Group stage (Group A)	(Sweden) IK Sävehof	32–29	36–27	5th
2023–24	Group stage (Group A)	(Denmark) Odense Håndbold	22–35	33–30	5th
2023–24	Group stage (Group A)	(France) Brest Bretagne Handball	31–24	38–28	5th
2023–24	Group stage (Group A)	(Montenegro) ŽRK Budućnost Podgorica	27–22	27–21	5th
2023–24	Group stage (Group A)	(Germany) SG BBM Bietigheim	26–36	27–31	5th
2023–24	Knockout stage	(Norway) Vipers	28–29	27–27	**55–56**
2025–26	Group stage (Group A)				
2025–26	Group stage (Group A)	(Norway) Storhamar HE	v	v	TBD
2025–26	Group stage (Group A)	(France) Metz Handball	v	v	TBD
2025–26	Group stage (Group A)	(Hungary) Győri ETO KC	v	v	TBD
2025–26	Group stage (Group A)	(Germany) Borussia Dortmund	v	v	TBD
2025–26	Group stage (Group A)	(Denmark) Team Esbjerg	v	v	TBD
2025–26	Group stage (Group A)	(Romania) CS Gloria Bistrița	v	v	TBD
2025–26	Group stage (Group A)	(Montenegro) ŽRK Budućnost Podgorica	v	v	TBD

=== European League (IHF and EHF Cup) ===
Season	Round	Club	Home	Away	Aggregate
1985–86; Finalist	Round of 16	(Belgium) DHC Neerpelt	44-11	34-8	**78–19**
1985–86; Finalist	Quarter-finals	(Norway) Gjerpen IF Skien	29-24	25-26	**54–50**
1985–86; Finalist	Semi-finals	(Sweden) Tyresö HF	27-19	25-20	**52–39**
1985–86; Finalist	Finals	(East Germany) SC Leipzig	22-16	15-25	**37–41**
1987–88	Round of 16	(Socialist Federal Republic of Yugoslavia) Belinka Ljubljana	28-25	22-26	**50–51**
1992–93	First round	(Turkey) Anadolu Un. SC Eskişehir	40-15	35-18	**75–33**
1992–93	Round of 16	(France) CSL Dijon	29-21	18-29	**47–50**
1993–94; Finalist	Round of 32	(Lithuania) Vytis Kaunas	32-15	34-14	**66–29**
1993–94; Finalist	Round of 16	(Russia) Rossijanka Volgograd	27-24	20-22	**47–46**
1993–94; Finalist	Quarter-finals	(Ukraine) Spartak Kyiv	33-19	25-23	**58–42**
1993–94; Finalist	Semi-finals	(Spain) Valencia Urbana	34-14	22-24	**46–38**
1993–94; Finalist	Finals	(Denmark) Viborg HK	24-21	20-23	**44–44 (a)**
1994–95; **Winner**	Round of 32	(Luxembourg) HB Echternach	48-2	42-4	**90–6**
1994–95; **Winner**	Round of 16	(Turkey) TMO SC Ankara	22-15	22-18	**44–33**
1994–95; **Winner**	Quarter-finals	(Romania) Silcotub Zalău	24-14	14-19	**38–33**
1994–95; **Winner**	Semi-finals	(Germany) Buxtehuder SV	21-21	23-23	**44–44 (a)**
1994–95; **Winner**	Finals	(Norway) Bækkelagets Oslo	22-14	22-30	**44–44 (a)**
1995–96; **Winner**	Round of 16	(Switzerland) TV Uster	28-15	26-20	**54–35**
1995–96; **Winner**	Quarter-finals	(Denmark) GOG Gudme	24-15	16-25	**40–40 (a)**
1995–96; **Winner**	Semi-finals	(Russia) Istochnik Rostov	25-20	23-22	**48–42**
1995–96; **Winner**	Finals	(Norway) Larvik HK	18-15	20-23	**38–38 (a)**
1996–97	Round of 16	(Slovakia) Plastika Nitra	17-12	14-19	**31–31 (a)**
1996–97	Quarter-finals	(Romania) Oțelul Galați	17-14	17-21	**34–35**
1998–99	Round of 32	(Croatia) ŽRK Osijek	18-11	25-23	**43–34**
1998–99	Round of 16	(Denmark) Viborg HK	25-20	12-30	**37–50**
1999–00	Round of 16	(Bosnia and Herzegovina) Interinvest Mostar	31-17	27-21	**58–38**
1999–00	Quarter-finals	(Spain) El Ferrobús Mislata	19-33	20-23	**39–56**
2000–01	Third round	(Austria) McDonald´s Wr.Neustadt	25-25	25-20	**50–45**
2000–01	Fourth round	(Poland) Zagłębie Lubin	28-25	13-17	**41–42**
2002–03	Second round	(Portugal) Madeira Andebol SAD	29-22	28-34	**57–56**
2002–03	Third round	(Greece) GAS Anagennisi Artas	10-0	26-25	**36–25**
2002–03	Fourth round	(Denmark) Slagelse FH	23-38	29-42	**52–80**
2005–06	Second round	(Russia) Astrakhanochka Astrakhan	21-18	23-25	**44–43**
2005–06	Third round	(Norway) Tertnes Bergen	31-19	20-28	**51–47**
2005–06	Round of 16	(Poland) SPR Icom Lublin	24-16	23-27	**47–43**
2005–06	Quarter-finals	(France) HB Metz Moselle Lorraine	20-16	23-25	**43–41**
2005–06	Semi-finals	(Croatia) Podravka Vegeta, Koprivnica	24-29	21-26	**45–55**
2006–07	Third round	(Romania) C.S. HC Zalău	41-21	31-21	**72–42**
2006–07	Round of 16	(France) HB Metz Moselle Lorraine	20-17	23-25	**43–42**
2006–07	Quarter-finals	(Denmark) Ikast Bording EH A/S	27–26	24–26	**51–52**
2016–17	Second qualifying round	(France) Nantes Loire Atlantique HB	26–28	23–24	**49–52**
2017–18	Second qualifying round	(Poland) Metraco Zagłębie Lubin	26–20	23–25	**49–45**
2017–18	Third qualifying round	(Romania) SCM Craiova	26–24	19–24	**45–48**
2019–20	Second qualifying round	(Germany) TSV Bayer 04-Werkselfen	35–27	34–31	**69–58**
2019–20	Third qualifying round	(Serbia) ŽORK Jagodina	37–26	36–26	**73–52**
2019–20	Group stage (Group A)	(Czech Republic) DHK Baník Most	36–29	29–28	3rd place
2019–20	Group stage (Group A)	(Turkey) Kastamonu Bld. GSK	32–34	31–30	3rd place
2019–20	Group stage (Group A)	(Germany) Thüringer HC	19–26	23–26	3rd place
2020–21	Third qualifying round	(Turkey) Kastamonu Bld. GSK	**30–31**		
2021–22	Third qualifying round	(Romania) Măgura Cisnădie	22–22	21–25	**43–47**
2022–23	Group stage (Group C)	(Denmark) Nykøbing Falster Håndbold	28–27	22–34	3rd place
2022–23	Group stage (Group C)	(Norway) Sola HK	25–21	25–30	3rd place
2022–23	Group stage (Group C)	(Croatia) Podravka Vegeta	32–31	26–20	3rd place
2024–25	Third qualifying round	(Romania) SCM Râmnicu Vâlcea	28–31	31–33	**59–64**

=== City Cup (Challenge Cup) ===
Season	Round	Club	Home	Away	Aggregate
1997–98	Round of 16	(Ukraine) Spartak Kyiv	25-27	24-32	**49–59**

=== Cup Winners' Cup ===
From the 2016–17 season, the women's competition was merged with the EHF Cup.

Season	Round	Club	Home	Away	Aggregate
1986–87	Round of 16	(Soviet Union) Selchoztecnica Krasnodar	23-23	24-29	47–52
1989–90; Finalist	First round	(Hungary) Vasas SC	**bye**		
1989–90; Finalist	Round of 16	(Socialist Federal Republic of Yugoslavia) Radnički Belgrade	33-17	21-29	54–46
1989–90; Finalist	Quarter-finals	(Czechoslovakia) Iskra Partizánske	31-19	21-21	52–40
1989–90; Finalist	Semi-finals	(Romania) Terom Iaşi	30-19	23-28	53–47
1989–90; Finalist	Finals	(Soviet Union) Rostselmash Rostov	21-17	18-28	39–45
1990–91	Round of 16	(Austria) Union Hollabrunn	32-14	30-23	62–37
1990–91	Quarter-finals	(Norway) Lunner IL Gran	33-28	23-24	56–52
1990–91	Semi-finals	(Socialist Federal Republic of Yugoslavia) Radnički Belgrade	23-21	21-30	44–51
1991–92; Finalist	Round of 16	(Turkey) Halkbank Ankara	38-15	33-21	71–36
1991–92; Finalist	Quarter-finals	(Croatia) Podravka Koprivnica	32-17	21-24	53–41
1991–92; Finalist	Semi-finals	(Norway) Byåsen IL Trondheim	19-19	23-23	42–42 (a)
1991–92; Finalist	Finals	(Socialist Federal Republic of Yugoslavia) Radnički Belgrade	26-21	19-24	45–45 (a)
2001–02	Third round	(Azerbaijan) Qaradağ Sement-Baku	45-20	36-32	81–52
2001–02	Fourth round	(Germany) TSV Bayer 04 Leverkusen	25-23	25-32	50–55
2007–08	Third round	(Montenegro) ŽRK Petrol Bonus Podgorica	44-12	30-12	74–24
2007–08	Round of 16	(Romania) C.S. Rulmentul-Urban Braşov	30-30	20-25	50–55
2008–09	Third round	(Italy) S.S. Pallamano Bancole	44-26	38-23	82–49
2008–09	Round of 16	(Romania) Oțelul Galați	34-29	24-29	58–58 (a)
2009–10	Third round	(Czech Republic) DHK ZORA Olomouc	39-27	28-25	67–52
2009–10	Fourth round	(Montenegro) Budućnost T-Mobile	27-20	20-28	47–48
2011–12	Third round	(Greece) Ormi-Loux Patras	41-26	31-27	72–53
2011–12	Round of 16	(Spain) BM. Mar Sagunto	28-28	31-25	59–53
2011–12	Quarter-finals	(Denmark) Viborg HK	25-39	25-42	50–81

=== Champions Trophy ===
Season	Round	Club	Result
1995; Finalist	Semi-final	(Hungary) Dunaferr SE (Cup Winners' Cup)	25–23
1995; Finalist	Final	(Russia) Rotor Volgograd (City Cup)	21–27
1996; Fourth place	Semi-final	(Germany) TV Giessen-Lützellinden (Cup Winners' Cup)	22–24
1996; Fourth place	Bronze match	(Romania) Silcotub Zalău (City Cup)	14–23
