= Vasas SC in European handball =

Vasas SC is a Hungarian handball club, based in XIII. district of Budapest, Hungary.

== European record ==
As of 15 August 2018:

Competition	Seasons	Year(s) in the competition
EHF Champions League (Champions Cup)	13x	1973/74, 1974/75, 1976/77, 1977/78, 1978/79, 1980/81, 1981/82, 1982/83, 1983/84, 1985/86, 1986/87, 1992/93, 1993/94
EHF Cup	4x	2004/05, 2005/06, 2008/09, 2009/10
EHF Cup Winners' Cup (defunct)	x	1984/85, 1985/86, 1988/89, 1989/90, 1990/91, 1991/92, 1992/93, 1996/97, 2000/01, 2007/08
Source: kézitörténelem.hu	23 seasons	

== EHF-organised seasonal competitions ==
Vasas score listed first. As of 26 November 2018.

=== European Cup and Champions League ===
Season	Round	Club	Home	Away	Aggregate
1973–74	Round of 16	(France) ASUL Vaulx-en-Velin	34-9	20-7	54–16
1973–74	Quarter-finals	(Socialist Federal Republic of Yugoslavia) Radnički Belgrade	15-12	8-12	23–24
1974–75	Round of 16	(Norway) IL Vestar Oslo	14-9	10-9	24–18
1974–75	Quarter-finals	(Bulgaria) CSKA Sofia	26-8	19-22	45–30
1974–75	Semi-finals	(Socialist Federal Republic of Yugoslavia) Lokomotiva Zagreb	14-11	11-16	25–27
1976–77	Round of 16	(Bulgaria) CSKA Sofia	15-12	17-14	32–26
1976–77	Quarter-finals	(Soviet Union) Spartak Kyiv	13-10	8-13	21–23
1977–78; Finalist	Round of 16	(Socialist Federal Republic of Yugoslavia) Radnički Belgrade	16-12	12-15	28–27
1977–78; Finalist	Quarter-finals	(West Germany) TSV GutsMuths Berlin	24-14	21-12	45–26
1977–78; Finalist	Semi-finals	(Poland) KS Ruch Chorzów	23-14	16-12	39–26
1977–78; Finalist	Final	(East Germany) TSC Berlin	14–19		
1978–79; Finalist	Round of 16	(Netherlands) Hellas Den Haag	33-4	27-11	60–15
1978–79; Finalist	Quarter-finals	(Socialist Federal Republic of Yugoslavia) Radnički Belgrade	16-12	9-12	25–24
1978–79; Finalist	Semi-finals	(East Germany) SC Leipzig	19-13	14-13	33–26
1978–79; Finalist	Finals	(Soviet Union) Spartak Kyiv	17-13	9-14	26–27
1980–81	First round	(Soviet Union) Spartak Kyiv	14-11	14-19	28–30
1981–82; Winner	Round of 16	(France) Paris UC	35-15	31-15	66–30
1981–82; Winner	Quarter-finals	(Netherlands) Hellas Den Haag	29-15	40-20	69–35
1981–82; Winner	Semi-finals	(Soviet Union) Spartak Kyiv	22-15	20-25	42–40
1981–82; Winner	Finals	(Socialist Federal Republic of Yugoslavia) Radnički Belgrade	29-19	21-24	50–43
1982–83	Round of 16	(Norway) Skjeberg IF	22-16	21-16	43–36
1982–83	Quarter-finals	(Hungary) Bp. Spartacus SC	14-16	21-16	35–32
1982–83	Semi-finals	(Socialist Federal Republic of Yugoslavia) Radnički KR Belgrade	26-22	22-32	48–54
1983–84	Round of 16	(France) Bordeaux EC	25-10	18-12	43–22
1983–84	Quarter-finals	(Czechoslovakia) Štart Bratislava	18-15	16-19	44–44 (a)
1983–84	Semi-finals	(West Germany) Bayer Leverkusen	17-17	12-15	29–32
1985–86	First round	(Turkey) Tarsus Erkusport	bye		
1985–86	Round of 16	(Israel) Maccabi Ramat Gan	35-9	34-11	69–20
1985–86	Quarter-finals	(Austria) Hypobank Südstadt	21-16	21-21	42–37
1985–86	Semi-finals	(Soviet Union) Spartak Kyiv	18-15	19-28	37–43
1986–87	Round of 16	(Socialist Federal Republic of Yugoslavia) Radnički Belgrade	27-22	13-27	40–49
1992–93; Finalist	First round	(Austria) SG WAT Funfhaus	21-12	15-17	36–29
1992–93; Finalist	Round of 16	(Turkey) TMO SC Ankara	26-14	19-18	45–32
1992–93; Finalist	Quarter-finals	(France) USM Gagny	25-21	21-18	46–39
1992–93; Finalist	Semi-finals	(Germany) TuS Walle Bremen	14-13	22-18	36–31
1992–93; Finalist	Finals	(Austria) Hypobank Südstadt	14-17	11-23	25–40
1993–94; Finalist	First round	(Switzerland) LC Brühl St. Gallen	33-15	26-24	59–39
1993–94; Finalist	Round of 16	(Denmark) GOG Gudme	22-13	20-27	42–40
1993–94; Finalist	Group stage (Group B)	(Germany) TV Giessen-Lützellinden	21-16	19-19	1st
1993–94; Finalist	Group stage (Group B)	(Norway) Gjerpen IF Skien	32-15	16-23	1st
1993–94; Finalist	Group stage (Group B)	(Austria) SG WAT Funfhaus	29-14	20-16	1st
1993–94; Finalist	Finals	(Austria) Hypo Niederösterreich	18-20	21-25	39–45

=== IHF and EHF Cup ===
Season	Round	Club	Home	Away	Aggregate
1984–85; Finalist	Round of 16	(Belgium) Sasja Antwerpen	29-6	41-6	70–12
1984–85; Finalist	Quarter-finals	(Soviet Union) Automobilist Baku	23-15	21-23	44–38
1984–85; Finalist	Semi-finals	(Czechoslovakia) THJ Iskra Partizánske	23-15	23-21	44–36
1984–85; Finalist	Finals	(East Germany) ASK Vorwärts Frankfurt	19-17	13-19	32–36
1996–97	Round of 16	(Poland) GZKS Sośnica Gliwice	24-22	33-21	57–43
1996–97	Quarter-finals	(Spain) Valencia Urbana	19-20	21-20	40–40 (a)
1996–97	Semi-finals	(Slovenia) Robit Olimpija Ljubljana	24-26	17-21	41–47

=== City Cup (Challenge Cup) ===
Season	Round	Club	Home	Away	Aggregate
1994–95; Finalist	Round of 16	(Slovenia) RK Kočevje	29-13	21-13	50–26
1994–95; Finalist	Quarter-finals	(Romania) Rapid București	24-14	21-19	45–33
1994–95; Finalist	Semi-finals	(Croatia) Graničar Đurđevac	20-14	15-20	35–34
1994–95; Finalist	Finals	(Russia) Rotor Volgograd	20-24	19-24	39–48
1998–99	Round of 16	(Bosnia and Herzegovina) Željezničar Hadžići	29-14	25-26	54–40
1998–99	Quarter-finals	(Romania) Oțelul Galați	21-20	20-24	41–44

=== Cup Winners' Cup ===
From the 2016–17 season, the women's competition was merged with the EHF Cup.

Season	Round	Club	Home	Away	Aggregate
1987–88; Finalist	Round of 16	(Romania) Mureşul Târgu Mureş	21-15	19-22	40–37
1987–88; Finalist	Quarter-finals	(East Germany) SC Leipzig	22-15	18-24	40–39
1987–88; Finalist	Semi-finals	(West Germany) TV Lützellinden	22-15	19-21	41–36
1987–88; Finalist	Finals	(Soviet Union) Kuban Krasnodar	20-20	17-28	37–48
1988–89	Round of 16	(Greece) Athinaikos	45-9	42-13	87–22
1988–89	Quarter-finals	(Romania) Știința Bacău	21-31	20-32	41–63
1995–96	Round of 32	(Denmark) Ikast F.S.	27-13	20-31	47–44
1995–96	Round of 16	(Italy) Jomsa Rimini	30-17	16-14	46–31
1995–96	Quarter-finals	(Russia) Rostselmash Rostov	21-14	17-24	38–38 (a)
1995–96	Semi-finals	(Croatia) Kras Zagreb	25-19	11-18	36–37
1997–98	Round of 32	(Romania) Silcotub Zalău	22-16	15-24	37–40
