= Dunaújvárosi Kohász KA in European handball =

Dunaújvárosi Kohász KA is a Hungarian handball club, based in Dunaújváros, Hungary.

== European record ==
As of 24 August 2018:

Competition	Seasons	Year(s) in the competition
EHF Champions League	8x	1998/99, 1999/00, 2001/02, 2002/03, 2003/04, 2004/05, 2005/06, 2008/09
EHF Cup	10x	1997/98, 2002/03, 2006/07, 2007/08, 2008/09, 2014/15, 2015/16, 2016/17, 2017/18, 2018/19
EHF Cup Winners' Cup (defunct)	5x	1994/95, 1995/96, 1996/97, 2000/01, 2005/06
Source: kézitörténelem.hu	20 seasons	

== EHF-organised seasonal competitions ==
Dunaújvárosi Kohász score listed first. As of 22 January 2019.

=== Champions League ===
Season	Round	Club	Home	Away	Aggregate
1998–99; Winner	Play-off round	(Slovakia) Slovan Duslo Šaľa	34-26	26-21	60–47
1998–99; Winner	Group stage (Group C)	(Austria) Hypo Niederösterreich	26-27	23-24	2nd
1998–99; Winner	Group stage (Group C)	(Romania) Oltchim Vâlcea	24-23	24-21	2nd
1998–99; Winner	Group stage (Group C)	(Greece) GAS Anagennisi Artas	35-18	33-29	2nd
1998–99; Winner	Quarter-finals	(Denmark) Ikast F.S.	28-23	22-25	50–48
1998–99; Winner	Semi-finals	(Austria) Hypo Niederösterreich	30-25	20-24	50–49
1998–99; Winner	Finals	(Slovenia) Krim Electa Ljubljana	25-23	26-26	51–49
1999–00	Group stage (Group D)	(Poland) Montex Lublin	32-26	26-29	2nd
1999–00	Group stage (Group D)	(Croatia) Podravka Dolcela	27-16	24-27	2nd
1999–00	Group stage (Group D)	(Greece) GAS Anagennisi Artas	41-19	27-21	2nd
1999–00	Quarter-finals	(Federal Republic of Yugoslavia) Budućnost Podgorica	33-33	25-27	58–60
2001–02	Group stage (Group B)	(Spain) Milar L'Eliana Valencia	22-23	20-22	3rd
2001–02	Group stage (Group B)	(Federal Republic of Yugoslavia) Budućnost Podgorica	28-20	25-33	3rd
2001–02	Group stage (Group B)	(Denmark) GOG Gudme	25-20	20-19	3rd
2002–03	Second qualifying round	(Spain) Ferrobús KU Mislata	31-25	20-27	51–52; EHF
2003–04	Group stage (Group A)	(Russia) HC Lada Togliatti	29-28	22-21	2nd
2003–04	Group stage (Group A)	(Germany) DJK/MJC Trier	30-22	24-24	2nd
2003–04	Group stage (Group A)	(Spain) El Osito L'Eliana Valencia	26-23	27-28	2nd
2003–04	Quarter-finals	(Serbia and Montenegro) ŽRK Budućnost MONET	29-24	31-26	60–50
2003–04	Semi-finals	(Denmark) Slagelse FH	34-29	22-32	56–61
2004–05	Group stage (Group A)	(Serbia and Montenegro) ŽRK Budućnost MONET	27-18	18-16	2nd
2004–05	Group stage (Group A)	(Spain) CBM Astroc Sagunto	35-28	33-26	2nd
2004–05	Group stage (Group A)	(Denmark) Ikast Bording EH	27-28	25-25	2nd
2004–05	Quarter-finals	(Denmark) Viborg HK A/S	27-26	31-30	58–56
2004–05	Semi-finals	(Denmark) Slagelse FH	25-28	17-21	42–49
2005–06	Second qualifying round	(Germany) 1. FC Nürnberg	29-30	25-20	54–50
2005–06	Group stage (Group B)	(Denmark) Slagelse DT	23-27	25-27	3rd CWC
2005–06	Group stage (Group B)	(Russia) Lada Togliatti	30-27	26-31	3rd CWC
2005–06	Group stage (Group B)	(Serbia and Montenegro) ŽRK Knjaz Miloš	39-24	27-24	3rd CWC
2008–09	Second qualification tournament (Group 4)	(Ukraine) Motor Zaporizhzhia	31-36		2nd EHF
2008–09	Second qualification tournament (Group 4)	(Serbia) HC Naisa Niš	28-20		2nd EHF
2008–09	Second qualification tournament (Group 4)	(Denmark) FCK Håndbold A/S	15-22		2nd EHF

=== EHF Cup ===
Season	Round	Club	Home	Away	Aggregate
1997–98; Winner	Round of 16	(Croatia) Samoborka Silex Samobor	30-21	34-21	64–42
1997–98; Winner	Quarter-finals	(Norway) Byåsen Trondheim	23-24	35-19	58–43
1997–98; Winner	Semi-finals	(Spain) CB Elda Prestigio	35-23	26-26	61–49
1997–98; Winner	Finals	(Slovakia) ŠKP Banská Bystrica	34-27	26-22	60–49
2002–03; Finalist	Third round	(Switzerland) Spono Nottwil	38-22	41-26	79–48
2002–03; Finalist	Fourth round	(Spain) AKABA Bera Bera	23-18	20-23	43–41
2002–03; Finalist	Quarter-finals	(Russia) Volgograd AKVA	23-18	22-25	45–43
2002–03; Finalist	Semi-finals	(Hungary) Cornexi Alcoa	33-28	22-23	55–51
2002–03; Finalist	Finals	(Denmark) Slagelse FH	27-22	20-27	47–49
2006–07	Third round	(Russia) Rostov-Don	30-16	26-24	56–40
2006–07	Round of 16	(Hungary) Kiskunhalas NKSE	31-20	28-27	59–47
2006–07	Quarter-finals	(Spain) Orsan Elda Prestigio	28-24	28-34	56–58
2007–08	Second round	(Azerbaijan) Garadag HC	46-14	38-20	84–34
2007–08	Third round	(Russia) Rostov-Don	33-23	28-26	61–49
2007–08	Round of 16	(Serbia) ŽRK Knjaz Miloš	40-24	43-29	83–53
2007–08	Quarter-finals	(Norway) Byåsen HB Elite	32-28	28-29	60–57
2007–08	Semi-finals	(Spain) Itxako-Navarra	27-23	22-28	49–51
2008–09	Third round	(Germany) VfL Oldenburg	31-31	27-29	58–60
2014–15	Third round	(North Macedonia) WHC Vardar II	28-20	30-15	58–35
2014–15	Round of 16	(Russia) Rostov-Don	28-29	19-28	47–57
2015–16; Winner	Third round	(Italy) Indeco Conversano	37-25	31-24	68–49
2015–16; Winner	Round of 16	(Hungary) Siófok KC	24-19	23-28	47–47 (a)
2015–16; Winner	Quarter-finals	(Russia) Astrakhanochka	25-20	23-26	48–46
2015–16; Winner	Semi-finals	(Denmark) Randers HK	23-25	29-27	52–52 (a)
2015–16; Winner	Finals	(Germany) TuS Metzingen	29-21	26-28	55–49
2016–17	Third qualifying round	(Hungary) Érd	25-31	22-29	47–60
2017–18	Second qualifying round	(Romania) C.S.M. Roman	31-24	25-27	56–51
2017–18	Third qualifying round	(Denmark) København Håndbold	20-23	21-22	41–45
2018–19	Second qualifying round	(Switzerland) Spono Eagles	43–14	35–21	78–35
2018–19	Third qualifying round	(Spain) BM Bera Bera	18–26	23–22	41–48

=== Cup Winners' Cup ===
From the 2016–17 season, the women's competition was merged with the EHF Cup.

Season	Round	Club	Home	Away	Aggregate
1994–95; Winner	Round of 32	(Bulgaria) Gabrovo HC	33-13	25-12	58–25
1994–95; Winner	Round of 16	(Denmark) Rødovre HK	25-13	23-19	48–32
1994–95; Winner	Quarter-finals	(Ukraine) Spartak Kyiv	24-19	24-25	48–44
1994–95; Winner	Semi-finals	(Russia) Rossijanka Volgograd	24-19	20-23	44–42
1994–95; Winner	Finals	(Germany) TV Giessen-Lützellinden	26-18	23-25	49–43
1995–96	Round of 32	(Portugal) Académico Madeira	31-11	34-14	65–25
1995–96	Round of 16	(Israel) Hapoel Petah Tikva	34-9	35-15	69–24
1995–96	Quarter-finals	(Croatia) Kras Zagreb	26-20	19-28	45–48
1996–97	Round of 32	(Bosnia and Herzegovina) Željezničar Sarajevo	39-14	51-6	90–20
1996–97	Round of 16	(Ukraine) Motor Zaporizhzhia	20-22	22-23	42–45
2000–01	Third round	(Lithuania) Eastcon AG Vilnius	27-25	31-15	58–40
2000–01	Fourth round	(France) E.S.B.F. Besancon	20-21	16-16	36–37
2005–06	Quarter-finals	(Norway) Gjerpen Handball Skien	32-32	28-29	60–61

=== Champions Trophy ===
Season	Round	Club	Result
1995; Fourth place	Semi-final	(Hungary) Debreceni VSC (EHF Cup)	23–25
1995; Fourth place	Bronze match	(Austria) Hypo Niederösterreich (Champions League I.)	25–29
1998; Third place	Semi-final	(Norway) Bækkelagets Oslo (Cup Winners' Cup)	23–27
1998; Third place	Bronze match	(Austria) Hypo Niederösterreich (Champions League I.)	28–23
1999; Winner	Semi-final	(Denmark) Viborg HK (EHF Cup)	28–27
1999; Winner	Final	(Norway) Bækkelagets Oslo (Cup Winners' Cup)	28–27
