= List of EHF women's club competition winners =

The European Handball Federation EHF is the governing body for Handball in Europe. It organises Three main Active club competitions for women : the EHF Champions League (formerly European Cup), the EHF Cup, and the EHF Challenge Cup. there is also another Two former EHF women's club competitions such as the EHF Cup Winners' Cup Existed between (1976–2016) and there is the EHF Women's Champions Trophy between (1994–2008). Former Soviet and present Ukrainian side Spartak Kyiv have won a record total of 13 titles in EHF Europe women's club competitions, Three more than the Austrian Hypo Niederösterreich.

The Danish clubs have won the most titles (25), ahead of clubs from the Soviet Union (21) and Hungary (21).

== Winners ==
=== By club ===
The following table lists all the women's clubs that have won at least one EHF Europe club competition, and is updated as of 05 May, 2025 (in chronological order).

Key

ECL	Champions League
EHC	EHF Cup
EHCC	EHF Challenge
ECW	EHF Cup Winners (defunct)
ECT	EHF Champions Trophy (defunct)

Most in category

List of EHF women's Europe club competition winners
Rk.	Club	ECL	EHC	EHCC	ECW	ECT	Total
1.	(Soviet Union) Spartak Kiev	13					13
2.	(Austria) Hypo Niederösterreich	8			1	1	10
3.	(Denmark) Viborg HK	3	3		1	2	9
4.	(Montenegro) ŽRK Budućnost	2	1		3		6
=	(Socialist Federal Republic of Yugoslavia) ŽRK Radnički	3			3		6
=	(Denmark) Herning-Ikast		2	1	2	1	6
=	(Hungary) Győri Audi ETO KC	6					6
8.	(Hungary) Dunaújvárosi Kohász	1	2		1	1	5
9.	(Denmark) Slagelse	3	1				4
=	(East Germany) SC Leipzig	2	2				4
=	(Slovenia) Krim Ljubljana	2				2	4
=	(Romania) Râmnicu Vâlcea		2		1	1	4
=	(Hungary) Ferencvárosi		1		3		4
14.	(Denmark) Holstebro		2		1		3
=	(Norway) Vipers Kristiansand	3					3
=	(Russia) Lada Handball		2		1		3
=	(Germany) TV Lützellinden	1			2		3
=	(Russia) Dinamo Volgograd		1	1		1	3
=	(Romania) Rapid București	1	1	1			3
=	(Spain) Sagunto	1			1	1	3
=	(Russia) Zvezda Zvenigorod	1	1			1	3
=	(Soviet Union) Rostov-Don		1		2		3
=	(Norway) Larvik HK	1			2		3
=	(East Germany) Berliner TSC	1			2		3
=	(East Germany) Frankfurt HC		2	1			3
=	(Spain) Balonmano Remudas			3			3
27.	(North Macedonia) Kometal Skopje	1				1	2
=	(Soviet Union) Žalgiris Kaunas	2					2
=	(Croatia) Podravka Koprivnica	1				1	2
=	(Hungary) Debreceni		2				2
=	(Socialist Federal Republic of Yugoslavia) Lokomotiva Zagreb		1	1			2
=	(Poland) Lublin		1	1			2
=	(Germany) Buxtehuder			2			2
=	(France) HB Nîmes			2			2
=	(France) Mios Biganos			2			2
=	(Soviet Union) Kuban Krasnodar				2		2
=	(Socialist Federal Republic of Yugoslavia) Osijek				2		2
=	(Norway) Bækkelagets SK				2		2
39.	(Hungary) Vasas Budapest	1					1
=	(Denmark) HG København	1					1
=	(Romania) Știința București	1					1
=	(Czechoslovakia) Sparta Praha	1					1
=	(Romania) CSM București	1					1
=	(Soviet Union) Luch Moscow	1					1
=	(Soviet Union) Eglė Vilnius		1				1
=	(Spain) Itxako Navarra		1				1
=	(Socialist Federal Republic of Yugoslavia) Trešnjevka Zagreb		1				1
=	(Soviet Union) Avtomobilist Baku		1				1
=	(Slovenia) Olimpija Ljubljana		1				1
=	(Spain) Amadeo Tortajada		1				1
=	(Hungary) Alba Fehérvár		1				1
=	(Denmark) Randers HK		1				1
=	(Romania) Craiova		1				1
=	(Hungary) Siófok KC		1				1
=	(France) Nantes Atlantique		1				1
=	(Germany) BBM Bietigheim		1				1
=	(Germany) Thüringer HC		1				1
=	(Norway) Storhamar HE		1				1
=	(Romania) CSM Cetate Deva			1			1
=	(Spain) Málaga Costa del Sol			1			1
=	(Romania) Corona Brașov			1			1
=	(Germany) Borussia Dortmund			1			1
=	(Serbia and Montenegro) ŽORK Napredak			1			1
=	(Germany) Bayer 04 Leverkusen			1			1
=	(Serbia) Naisa Niš			1			1
=	(Germany) 1. FC Nürnberg			1			1
=	(Germany) VfL Oldenburg			1			1
=	(Romania) HC Zalău			1			1
=	(France) Le Havre AC			1			1
=	(Spain) Balonmano Elche			1			1
=	(Czech Republic) DHK Baník Most			1			1
=	(Sweden) H 65 Höör			1			1
=	(Iceland) Valur Club			1			1
=	(Hungary) Budapesti Spartacus				1		1
=	(Czechoslovakia) Slávia Partizánske				1		1
=	(Socialist Federal Republic of Yugoslavia) Dalma Split				1		1
=	(Romania) Ştiinţa Bacău				1		1
=	(Germany) TuS Walle Bremen				1		1
=	(Ukraine) Motor Zaporizhzhia				1		1
=	(France) ESBF Besançon				1		1
=	(Denmark) FC København				1		1

=== By country ===
The following table lists all the countries whose clubs have won at least one EHF competition, and is updated as of 05 May, 2025 (in chronological order).

Key

ECL	Champions League
EHC	EHF Cup
EHCC	EHF Challenge
ECW	EHF Cup Winners (defunct)
ECT	EHF Champions Trophy (defunct)

Most in category

List of EHF women's Europe club competition winners by country
Rk.	Nation	ECL	EHC	EHCC	ECW	ECT	Total
1.	Denmark	7	9	1	5	3	25
2.	Soviet Union	16	2		3		21
=	Hungary	8	7		5	1	21
4.	Romania	3	4	4	2	1	14
=	Germany	1	3	7	3		14
6.	Yugoslavia	3	3		7		13
7.	Austria	8			1	2	11
=	Russia	1	5	1	2	2	11
9.	Spain	1	2	5	1	1	10
10	Norway	4	1		4		9
11.	East Germany	3	3		2		8
12.	France		1	5		1	7
13.	Slovenia	2	1			2	5
14.	Montenegro	2			1		3
=	Croatia	1		1		1	3
16.	North Macedonia	1				1	2
=	Czechoslovakia	1			1		2
=	Poland		1	1			2
=	Serbia and Montenegro			1	1		2
20	Serbia			1			1
=	Sweden			1			1
=	Czech Republic			1			1
=	Iceland			1			1
=	Ukraine				1		1

== See also ==
- European Handball Federation
