= 1999–2000 EHF Women's Cup Winners' Cup =

The 1999–2000 EHF Women's Cup Winners' Cup was the 24th edition of EHF's competition for women's handball national cup champions. It ran from October 1, 1999, to May 28, 2000.

1997 Champions League champion Mar Valencia became the first Spanish team to win the Cup Winners' Cup, defeating 1988 and 1989 champion Kuban Krasnodar in the final.

== Results ==
Preliminary round October 1–10, 1999
(Slovakia) Iskra Partizánske	22	22	44
(Russia) Kuban Krasnodar	23	26	49
(North Macedonia) RK Skopje	13	15	28
(Switzerland) LC Brühl	28	25	53
(Austria) UHC Stockerau	38	38	76
(Georgia (country)) Kolkheti Poti	14	18	32
(Turkey) Üsküdar Belediyesi	16	15	31
(Ukraine) Spartak Kyiv	45	38	83
(Israel) Maccabi Holon	21	13	34
(Germany) TV Lützellinden	31	44	75
(Belgium) Sporting Neerpelt	36	31	67
(Cyprus) AC Latsia	15	24	39
(Bulgaria) Lokomotiv Plovdiv	22	25	47
(Romania) Oţelul Galaţi	26	24	50
(Greece) OFN Ionias	21	24	45
(Latvia) SK Ulbroka	17	20	37
(Denmark) Ikast Bording	27	23	50
(Serbia and Montenegro) Napredak Kruševac	22	24	46
(Slovenia) Olimpija Ljubljana	28	24	52
(France) Cercle Nîmes	15	22	37
(Netherlands) SV Nieuwegein
(Croatia) Kras Zagreb	w/o
(Portugal) Porto Salvo	26	17	43
(Poland) Start Elblag	34	40	74
(Italy) HC Rimini
(Spain) Mar Valencia	w/o
(Hungary) Győri Graboplast	48	33	81
(Bosnia and Herzegovina) Željezničar Sarajevo	12	13	25

Round of 16; October 30 – November 7, 1999
(Russia) Kuban Krasnodar	35	34	69
(Switzerland) LC Brühl	24	18	42
(Norway) Nordstrand IF	35	30	65
(Austria) UHC Stockerau	19	23	42
(Norway) Larvik HK	36	14	50
(Ukraine) Spartak Kyiv	24	28	52
(Germany) TV Lützellinden	37	39	76
(Belgium) Sporting Neerpelt	15	10	25
(Romania) Oţelul Galaţi	31	27	58
(Greece) OFN Ionias	20	24	44
(Denmark) Ikast Bording	24	28	52
(Slovenia) Olimpija Ljubljana	23	20	43
(Croatia) Kras Zagreb	28	27	55
(Poland) Start Elblag	29	24	53
(Spain) Mar Valencia	29	23	52
(Hungary) Győri ETO	21	27	48

Quarterfinals; March 18–26, 2000
(Russia) Kuban Krasnodar	29	20	49
(Norway) Nordstrand IF	18	16	34
(Ukraine) Spartak Kyiv	31	26	57
(Germany) TV Lützellinden	30	29	59
(Romania) Oţelul Galaţi	18	22	40
(Denmark) Ikast Bording	20	23	43
(Croatia) Kras Zagreb	25	25	50
(Spain) Mar Valencia	29	32	61

Semifinals; April 22–30, 2000
(Russia) Kuban Krasnodar	26	20	46
(Ukraine) Spartak Kyiv	15	30	45
(Denmark) Ikast Bording	28	21	49
(Spain) Mar Valencia	25	31	56

Final; May 20–28, 2000
(Russia) Kuban Krasnodar	24	30	54
(Spain) Mar Valencia	31	31	62
