= 1991–92 IHF Women's Cup Winners' Cup =

The 1991–92 IHF Women's Cup Winners' Cup was the 16th edition of IHF's competition for European women's handball national cup champions. Contested by 23 teams, it ran from September 29, 1991, to April 20, 1992.

Defending champion Radnički Belgrade again won the competition, beating Debreceni VSC in a rematch of the previous season's semifinals. It was Radnički's third Cup Winners' Cup and the last of their six European trophies. This was the last edition where the Soviet Union was represented as it was dissolved one month after Spartak Kyiv was knocked out in the Round of 16, while Croatia made its debut as an independent country.

== Results ==
Preliminary round September 29 – October 5, 1991
(Croatia) Podravka Koprivnica	30	40	70
Cyprus College	19	16	35
(Belgium) Fémina Visé	?
(Luxembourg) HC Berchem	?
(Turkey) Halfbank Ankara	?
(Bulgaria) NSA Sofia	?
(Netherlands) VeL Geleen	17	14	31
(France) ASPTT Metz	23	21	44
(Sweden) Västerås Irsta	26	28	54
(Poland) Pogoń Szczecin	20	23	43
(Israel) Kiryat Sharet Holon	15	7	22
(Italy) HC Sassari	28	38	66
(Spain) EMT Pegaso	16	?
(Portugal) CD Paços de Arcos	14	?

Round of 16; November 10–17, 1991
(Croatia) Podravka Koprivnica	31	26	57
(Belgium) Fémina Visé	19	8	27
(Hungary) Debreceni VSC	38	33	71
(Turkey) Halbank Ankara	15	21	36
(Norway) Byåsen IL	23	25	48
(Austria) WAT Fünfhaus	17	23	40
(France) ASPTT Metz	?
(Sweden) Västerås Irsta	?
(Romania) Ştiinţa Bacău	32	29	61
(Soviet Union) Spartak Kyiv	19	25	44
(Denmark) Ikast FS	21	18	39
(Socialist Federal Republic of Yugoslavia) Radnički Belgrade	30	28	58
(Germany) Bayer Leverkusen	24	25	49
(Czechoslovakia) Slovan Duslo Šaľa	17	20	37
(Italy) HC Sassari	?
(Portugal) CD Paços de Arcos	?

Quarterfinals; January 11–19, 1992
(Croatia) Podravka Koprivnica	24	17	41
(Hungary) Debreceni VSC	17	32	49
(Norway) Byåsen IL (a)	11	22	33
(France) ASPTT Metz	16	17	33
(Romania) Ştiinţa Bacău	26	18	44
(Socialist Federal Republic of Yugoslavia) Radnički Belgrade	21	25	46
(Germany) Bayer Leverkusen	41	31	72
(Italy) HC Sassari	17	19	36

Semifinals; February 5–23, 1992
(Hungary) Debreceni VSC (a)	19	23	42
(Norway) Byåsen IL	19	23	42
(Socialist Federal Republic of Yugoslavia) Radnički Belgrade	21	21	42
(Germany) Bayer Leverkusen	18	22	40

Final; April 5–20, 1992
(Hungary) Debreceni VSC	26	19	45
(Socialist Federal Republic of Yugoslavia) Radnički Belgrade (a)	21	24	45
