= Vinko Kandija =

Croatian handball player and coach (1934–2002)

Personal information
- Nationality: Croatian
- Born: May 23, 1934 Trogir, Kingdom of Yugoslavia
- Died: 10 March 2002 (aged 67) Vienna, Austria
- Height: 1.83 m (6 ft 0 in)

Sport
- Sport: Handball
- Position: Goalkeeper

Senior clubs
- Years: Team
- –: Split

Teams managed
- 1966–1970: ŽRK Trogir (Youth)
- 1966–1971: ŽRK Trogir
- 1971–1980: ŽRK Radnički Belgrade
- 1974–1979: Yugoslavia Women
- 1980: Switzerland Men
- 1980–1981: Grasshopper HC Zürich
- 1981–1982: ŽRK Radnički Belgrade
- 1983–1985: RK Budućnost Titograd
- 1985–1990: Hypo NÖ
- 1986–1994: UHK Volksbank Wien
- 1992: Austria Women
- 1992–1993: Austria Men
- 1994–1995: RK Badel 1862 Zagreb
- 1995–1999: RK Krim Mercator
- 2000–2001: Austria Women
- 2002: SG West Wien

Vinko Kandija (May 23, 1934 – March 10, 2002) was a Croatian handball player and coach. Kandija won over 40 titles and trophies in the game with male and female teams.

His coaching career took him to several clubs, particularly women’s teams, where he won approximately fifty titles. These achievements contributed to his reputation as a successful handball coach in his country and internationally. He was nicknamed the “last romanticist,” a reference associated with his coaching and leadership style.

His biggest achievement was winning the Women's European Champions Cup four times and Women's EHF Cup Winners' Cup once in 1984–85.

== Club career ==
During his playing days Kandija co-founded the RK Trogir in 1958 witch formed male and female handball departments. Kandija mostly coached the women's youth selections at the club before taking on the senior team who he took to the Yugoslav First League in 1967.

During the 1970s Kandija coached women's side Radnički from Belgrade. With the club he won 8 league titles and four cup titles dominating in Yugoslavia during the decade. The club reached the European Champions Cup semi final in 1974 and 1977, final in 1982 and won the competition in 1976 and 1980. During the 1980–81 season Kandija coached men's team Grasshopper Club Zürich in Switzerland. Kandija move to Titograd in 1983 and coached ŽRK Budućnost for two years winning one league and one cup title and the 1984–85 IHF Women's Cup Winners' Cup.

After his successful run in Budućnost Kandija moved to Austria where he coached women's club Hypo NÖ and men's club SG West Wien (then called UHK Volksbank Wien) at the same time. During this time Kandija 15 titles winning two European Champions Cup with Hypo NÖ and reaching semi-final of EHF Champions League with West Wien. After these feats Kandija was noted as a handball guru in Austria.

Kandija coached RK Badel 1862 Zagreb for one season winning the domestic double and reaching the EHF Champions League final. They lost the match to CD Bidasoa Irún they lost the match by 9 goals on aggregate. The final is well remembered for the riot that happened in the second match in Dom Sportova by the home supporters after Zagreb lost. After Zagreb he coached RK Krim for four seasons. He took the club to their first Women's EHF Champions League final.

== National team career ==
From 1974 to 1979 Kandija was the national team head coach of Yugoslavia (women). With the team he secured fifth place both at the 1975 and 1978 World Championships.

From February to July Kandija was head coach of Switzerland (men) who he took to the 1980 Summer Olympics in Moscow where the team was placed in eight place. Due to this bad result he was sacked after the tournament.

In 1992 he was appointed head coach of Austria (women) for the upcoming 1992 Summer Olympics in Barcelona. The team finished in fifth place. After the tournament he was appointed head coach of the Austrian men's team whom he helped qualify for the 1993 World Championship in Sweden. They were knocked out during the first phase of the tournament and finished in 14 place out of 16 teams. In 2000 he was once again appointed head coach of Austria (women) for the upcoming Summer Olympics in Sydney. The team finished in fifth place at the tournament. He also led the team to the 2000 European Championship where the team finished in last place.

== Death ==
Kandija died on 9 March 2002 in Vienna after a long illness. His funeral was held on 15 March at the cemetery in Trogir.

== Legacy ==
After his death the city of Trogir named their town sports hall SD Vinko Kandija in honor of him.

Since his death there has also been a tournament held named: Memorijal Vinko Kandija where women clubs he coached participate such as RK Krim and Hypo NÖ with the addition of guests.

== Honours ==
ŽRK Trogir

- Croatian U-14 Championship (3): 1966, 1968, 1973
- Croatian U-19 Championship (4): 1966, 1967, 1969, 1970

ŽRK Trogir

- Yugoslav First League Promotion (1): 1966–67

ŽRK Radnički Belgrade

- Yugoslav First League (8): 1971–72, 1972–73, 1974–75, 1975–76, 1976–77, 1977–78, 1978–79, 1981–82
- Yugoslav Cup (4): 1973, 1975, 1976, 1979
- European Champions Cup (2): 1975–76, 1979–80

ŽRK Budućnost Titograd

- Yugoslav First League (1): 1984–85
- Yugoslav Cup (1): 1984,
- EHF Cup Winners' Cup (1): 1984–85

Hypo NÖ

- Austrian Bundesliga (5): 1985–86, 1986–87, 1987–88, 1988–89, 1989–90
- OHB Cup (3): 1988, 1989, 1990
- European Champions Cup (2): 1988–89, 1989–90

UHK Volksbank Wien

- Austrian Bundesliga (4): 1988–89, 1990–91, 1991–92, 1992–93
- Austrian Cup (2): 1992, 1993
- Student World Cup (1): 1992

RK Badel 1862 Zagreb

- Croatian First A League (1): 1994–95
- Croatian Cup (1): 1995

RK Krim Mercator

- 1. A DRLŽ (4): 1995–96, 1996–97, 1997–98, 1998–99
- Slovenian Cup (3): 1996, 1997, 1999

Individual

- Lifetime achievement award from the city of Trogir – 2002 (post mortem)
