= 1992–93 IHF Women's Cup Winners' Cup =

The 1992–93 IHF Women's Cup Winners' Cup was the 17th edition of the European competition for women's handball national cup champions, and the last organized by IHF.

TV Lützellinden, the previous European Cup's runner-up, defeated 1990 champion Rostselmash in the final, becoming the first team from the former Western Bloc to win the Cup Winners' Cup. Yugoslavia, whose team Radnički Belgrade had won the two previous editions, was excluded from the competition in implementation of the UNSC Resolution 575, while Slovenia and Ukraine debuted as independent countries.

== Results ==
First preliminary round September 27 – October 4, 1992
(Romania) Chimistul Rm. Vâlcea	36	37	73
(Cyprus) Kefalovrysos Kythreas	20	21	41
(Slovenia) Oprema Kovevje	17	14	31
(Croatia) Podravka Koprivnica	24	39	63
(Netherlands) VeL Geleen	24	18	42
(Belgium) Fémina Visé	16	14	30
(Sweden) IK Sävehof	21	21	43
(Denmark) Frederiksberg IF	21	19	40
(Spain) Urbana Tortajada	?
(Portugal) Colégio de Gaia	?

Second preliminary round January 10–17, 1993
(Romania) Chimistul Rm. Vâlcea	29	20	49
(France) ASPTT Metz	18	19	37
(Croatia) Podravka Koprivnica	33	?
(Netherlands) VeL Geleen	17	?
(Sweden) IK Sävehof	20	21	41
(Norway) Byåsen IL	21	22	43
(Germany) TV Lützellinden	23	?
(Hungary) Épitők SC	20	?
(Ukraine) Motor Zaporozhie	25	?
(Spain) Urbana Tortajada	20	?

Quarterfinals; February 21–28, 1993
(Romania) Chimistul Rm. Vâlcea	30	28	58
(Croatia) Podravka Koprivnica	25	32	57
(Norway) Byåsen IL	18	18	36
(Germany) TV Lützellinden	16	24	40
(Ukraine) Motor Zaporozhie	24	?
(Bulgaria) Volan Sofia	13	?
(Russia) Rostselmash
(Turkey) Vestel Manisa

Semifinals; April 4–11, 1993
(Romania) Chimistul Rm. Vâlcea	32	17	49
(Germany) TV Lützellinden	27	23	50
(Ukraine) Motor Zaporozhie	10	12	22
(Russia) Rostselmash	18	13	31

Final ?
(Germany) TV Lützellinden	23	25	48
(Russia) Rostselmash	21	22	43
