= Svetlana Kitić =

Bosnian and Serbian handball player

Personal information
- Full name: Svetlana Kitić
- Born: 7 June 1960 (age 66) Tuzla, PR Bosnia and Herzegovina, FPR Yugoslavia

Sport
- Sport: Handball
- Position: Centre back

Senior clubs
- Years: Team
- 1976–1980: Jedinstvo Tuzla
- 1980–1992: Radnički Belgrade
- 1996–2000: Željezničar
- 2000–2006: Jedinstvo Tuzla
National team
Years	Team	Apps	(Gls)
1980–1991	Yugoslavia	202	(911)
2002–2003	Bosnia and Herzegovina		
Medal record
Women's Handball
Representing Yugoslavia
Olympic Games
Silver medal – second place	1980 Moscow	Team
Gold medal – first place	1984 Los Angeles	Team
World Championship
Silver medal – second place	1990 South Korea	Team
Junior World Championship
Gold medal – first place	1977 Romania	Team
Bronze medal – third place	1979 Yugoslavia	Team
Mediterranean Games
Gold medal – first place	1979 Split	Team

Svetlana Kitić (Serbian Cyrillic: Светлана Китић, born 19 June 1960) is a retired professional handball player who competed at the 1980 and 1984 Summer Olympics for Yugoslavia, and was part of the Bosnia and Herzegovina national team in the early 2000s. In 2010, she was voted the best female handball player ever by the IHF.

== Biography ==
Kitić was born in Tuzla Bosnia and Herzegovina, in a Bosnian Serb family. Later in her career she returned to Bosnia and Herzegovina after the war, and simultaneously coached and played for Sarajevo based handball club Željezničar and later for Jedinstvo, club from her hometown Tuzla and where she started professional career in handball as 16-year-old girl. Moreover, she played together with her eldest daughter Mara Bogunović on Jedinstvo's first team. In 2002, she entered Bosnian women's national handball team which took part in qualifications for 2003 World Championship in Zagreb. Bosnia with Kitić reached the barrage but failed to qualify. After that Kitić took the role of Director of Bosnian women's national handball team and served between 2006 and 2008.

She last played for Radnički in Belgrade, Serbia.

In 1980 she won the silver medal with the Yugoslav team. She played all five matches and scored 29 goals. Four years later she won the gold medal as member of the Yugoslav team. She played all five matches and scored 22 goals. In all her representative career she played 202 matches and scored the incredible number of 911 goals. She was voted World Player of the Year 1988 by the International Handball Federation in the inaugural edition of the award.

== Awards ==
She won the Oscar of Popularity for the year 2010 in Serbia.

== Personal life ==
=== Marriages and relationships ===
Kitić has been married four times and is the mother of three children, fathered by three different men. She resides in Belgrade (Serbia) with her family.

In 1977, within a year of arriving to Belgrade to play for Radnički, teenage Kitić began dating the professional handball player Dragan Dašić. The relationship ended by 1979.

At the age of 20, Kitić started dating the 21-year-old Velež Mostar professional footballer Blaž Slišković, after getting introduced to him during spring 1980 in Belgrade's Hotel Majestic while their respective teams' stays overlapped at the venue. They would get married only six months later. The civic wedding ceremony in Mostar's Hotel Ruža on 26 September 1980—with Velež goalkeeper Enver Marić as the groom's best man and Jasna Merdan as the bride's maid of honour—took place in front of 500 guests. Taking place following the 1980 Olympics in Moscow where Kitić had won silver with the Yugoslav national team while Slišković disappointingly failed to medal with the Yugoslavia Olympic football team, the wedding, much like the couple's entire relationship, received extensive coverage in the Yugoslav press. The two reportedly even considered getting married at the Olympic Village during the Olympics before eventually giving up on those plans due to logistics as Yugoslavia football team played their matches in Minsk. Following the wedding, Kitić moved to Mostar to live with her husband despite still being contractually bound to her Belgrade-based club, ŽRK Radnički. Though intent on signing with Mostar-based ŽRK Lokomotiva, she was prevented from doing so due to Radnički refusing to let her out of their contract. Unable to play professional handball as a result of the contract dispute, she began attending Lokomotiva practices to maintain competitive shape. The couple divorced in early February 1981, only four months after the wedding.

After divorcing Slišković and returning to Belgrade to rejoin Radnički, Kitić rekindled her relationship with Dragan Dašić, who had in the meantime ended his professional handball playing career and moved on to becoming a handball referee. The couple married in 1982 and lived in Belgrade. As a result of getting married, she hyphenated her last name and began going by Svetlana Dašić-Kitić. Their child, son Nikola, was born prematurely in December 1982 and thus had to spend time in an incubator. During the pregnancy, 22-year-old Kitić reportedly actively played handball until the beginning of her third trimester. The pregnancy caused her to be absent from the Yugoslav national team at the World Championship in Hungary. She returned to playing professional handball only month-and-a-half after giving birth. The couple divorced in 1986 after four years of marriage. In later interviews, Kitić stated that Dašić's "unwillingness/inability to participate in parenting to the extent [I] needed him to" led to the end of their marriage, adding that she had always been intent on pursuing both motherhood and professional handball simultaneously without ever once considering choosing one over the other. The divorce was followed by a legal process for the custody of their toddler son. The court ended up awarding custody to Dašić with several considerations—Dašić possessing a property adjudged to be better suited for child raising than Kitić's Belgrade apartment and Kitić moving abroad to play for a club in West Germany—ultimately swinging the decision in Dašić's favour.

In 1988, she married the talent manager Goran Bogunović whom she had a child, daughter Marina (Mara), with. The couple split in 1990 with Kitić citing domestic violence she allegedly suffered from Bogunović as the reason for the breakup.

In 1995, Kitić began dating the entrepreneur Zoran "Koča" Kovačević, who had been running the Zona Sreće betting shop chain in Belgrade. He had formerly been active as a boxer and was furthermore known around town as a gambling enthusiast with reported criminal ties. Like Kitić, who had at that point had two children from previous marriages, Kovačević also had three children from a previous marriage of his own. In early May 1998, the couple had a child, daughter Aleksandra (Saška), born out-of-wedlock. On 18 May 1998, only two weeks after the birth of their daughter, Kovačević was murdered in a gangland-style targeted slaying by two gunmen who opened fire from automatic weaponry as he entered his BMW 318 parked in front of Kitić's house at Belgrade's Braće Jerković neighbourhood where the couple resided. Considered to be tied to events in the late 1990s Belgrade underworld as part of a fight for control over gambling rackets—and taking place only weeks after the killing of an even more prominent organized crime-connected entrepreneur, Lavovi betting shop owner Jusuf "Jusa" Bulić—Kovačević's murder remains unsolved. In later interviews, Kitić—nursing their baby daughter at the time of Kovačević's murder—revealed that she had lost her breast milk as a result of the shock and had subsequently experienced major problems nursing the infant. In an interview decades after Kovačević's murder, looking back on her past romantic relationships, 62-year-old Kitić referred to him as "the love of her life".

In 2007, she married Milan Magić with whom she took part on a reality television show; their marriage ended in 2014.

=== Children ===
Kitić's daughter with Bogunović, Marina Bogunović, followed in her mother's footsteps to become a professional handball player herself.

== Honours ==
=== Player ===
Radnički Belgrade

- Yugoslav Women's Handball Championship: 1981, 1982, 1983, 1984, 1986, 1987
- Yugoslav Women's Handball Cup: 1983, 1985, 1986, 1990, 1991, 1992
- Women's EHF Champions League: 1975–76, 1979–80, 1983–84
- Women's EHF Cup Winners' Cup: 1985–86, 1990–91, 1990–91, 1991–92

Yugoslavia Youth

- IHF Women's Junior World Championship: 1977, third-place 1979

Yugoslavia

- Summer Olympics: runner-up 1980, 1984
- IHF World Women's Handball Championship: runner-up 1990
- Mediterranean Games: 1979

Awards
Preceded by Mirjana Jovović	Yugoslav Sportswoman of the Year; 1984	Succeeded by Monica Seles
New title	IHF World Player of the Year – Women; 1988	Succeeded by (South Korea) Kim Hyun-Mee
