= 1982–83 IHF Women's Cup Winners' Cup =

Seventh edition of women's handball national cup champions

The 1982–83 IHF Women's Cup Winners' Cup was the seventh edition of IHF's competition for European women's handball national cup champions. It was contested by 20 teams, two more than the previous edition.

Defending champion RK Osijek defeated SC Magdeburg on away goals in the final to win its second European trophy, becoming the first Cup Winners' Cup champion to successfully defend the title.

== Results ==
Preliminary round
(Spain) BM Zaragoza	15	17	32
(Portugal) CA Campo de Ourique	16	24	40
(Austria) Post Wien	29	28	57
(Luxembourg) HB Dudelange	10	16	26
(Switzerland) RTV Basel	25	16	41
(Belgium) IF Hasselt	12	10	22
(Italy) Ariosto Ferrara	14	19	33
(Turkey) Istanbul BA	14	9	23

Round of 16
(Norway) IF Hosle	9	14	23
(Sweden) Västerås Irsta	14	16	30
(East Germany) SC Magdeburg	30	25	55
(France) Paris UC	7	18	25
(Soviet Union) Rostselmash	29	19	48
(Socialist Federal Republic of Yugoslavia) ORK Belgrade	13	20	33
(Portugal) CA Campo de Ourique	7	13	20
(Hungary) Épitők SC	28	30	58
(Denmark) Frederiksberg IF	23	10	33
(Netherlands) Hellas Den Haag	13	21	34
(Czechoslovakia) TJ Gottwaldov	29	30	59
(Austria) Post Wien	8	11	19
(Socialist Federal Republic of Yugoslavia) RK Osijek	30	16	46
(West Germany) SSC Südwest Berlin	19	18	37
(Switzerland) RTV Basel	21	21	42
(Italy) Arioso Ferrara	14	16	30

Quarterfinals
(Sweden) Västerås Irsta	19	18	37
(East Germany) SC Magdeburg	27	32	59
(Soviet Union) Rostselmash	22	20	42
(Hungary) Épitők SC	16	16	32
(Netherlands) Hellas Den Haag	17	12	29
(Czechoslovakia) TJ Gottwaldov	19	21	40
(Socialist Federal Republic of Yugoslavia) RK Osijek	28	19	47
(Switzerland) RTV Basel	9	16	25

Semifinals
(East Germany) SC Magdeburg	18	24	42
(Soviet Union) Rostselmash	11	19	30
(Czechoslovakia) TJ Gottwaldov	22	21	43
(Socialist Federal Republic of Yugoslavia) RK Osijek	21	23	44

Final
(East Germany) SC Magdeburg	27	19	46
(Socialist Federal Republic of Yugoslavia) RK Osijek (a)	21	25	46
