= 1994–95 EHF Women's Cup Winners' Cup =

Women's handball tournament

The 1994–95 EHF Women's Cup Winners' Cup was the 19th edition of EHF's competition for women's handball national cup champions. It ran from October 7, 1994, to May 6, 1995. The Preliminary round was expanded to a Round of 32, with Belarus and Georgia debuting in the competition.

In a second straight German-Hungarian final, Dunaferr Dunaújváros defeated 1993 champion TV Lützellinden to win its first European trophy, becoming the third Cup Winners' Cup champion from Hungary and ending a streak of five lost finals by Hungarian teams in the competition since 1981.

== Results ==
Round of 32; October 7, 1994 – October 16, 1994
(Sweden) Västerås Irsta	16	19	35
(Germany) TV Lützellinden	25	29	54
(Turkey) Anadolu Üniversitesi	22	16	38
(Poland) GKS Piotrkovia	14	28	42
(Italy) Jomsa Rimini	27	17	44
(Norway) Gjerpen IF	26	39	65
(Israel) Kiryat Sharet Holon	13	14	27
(Czech Republic) Novesta Zlín	29	26	55
(Croatia) Lokomotiva Zagreb	23	18	41
(Romania) Chimistul Rm. Vâlcea	22	24	46
(North Macedonia) Vardar Skopje	24	20	44
(Slovenia) Krim Ljubljana	26	29	55
(Belarus) Universitet Gomel	34	26	60
(Switzerland) Spono Nottwil	25	27	52
(Slovakia) Impex Topolniky	16	21	37
(Germany) Borussia Dortmund	18	24	42
(Luxembourg) HC Berchem
(Ukraine) Spartak Kyiv	w/o
(Netherlands) Saturnus Leiden (a)	22	23	45
(Lithuania) Eglė Vilnius	21	24	45
(Bulgaria) Gabrovo HC	12	13	25
(Hungary) Dunaferr Dunaújváros	25	33	58
(Georgia (country)) Kolkheti Poti	13	9	22
(Denmark) Rødovre HK	33	37	70
(Spain) Leganés Alcampo	17	10	27
(Russia) Rossiyanka Volgograd	17	26	43
(Belgium) Fémina Visé	19	14	33
(Portugal) Académico Madeira	21	26	47
(Iceland) ÍBV Vestmannaeyjar	13	21	34
(France) USM Gagny	22	24	46
(Austria) Admira Landhaus	35	28	63
(Greece) Ethnikos Kozani	12	22	34

Round of 16; November 12, 1994 – November 20, 1994
(Germany) TV Lützellinden	35	22	57
(Poland) GKS Piotrkovia	13	20	33
(Norway) Gjerpen IF	26	21	47
(Czech Republic) Novesta Zlin	25	25	50
(Romania) Chimistul Rm. Vâlcea	32	22	54
(Slovenia) Krim Ljubljana	24	32	56
(Belarus) Universitet Gomel	18	23	41
(Germany) Borussia Dortmund	29	36	65
(Ukraine) Spartak Kyiv	33	31	64
(Netherlands) Saturnus Leiden	16	17	33
(Hungary) Dunaferr Dunaújváros	25	23	48
(Denmark) Rødovre HK	13	19	32
(Russia) Rossiyanka Volgograd	30	31	61
(Portugal) Académico Madeira	16	22	38
(France) USM Gagny	23	16	39
(Austria) Admira Landhaus	14	15	29

Quarterfinals; January 21, 1995 – January 29, 1995
(Germany) TV Lützellinden	24	25	49
(Czech Republic) Novesta Zlín	14	19	33
(Slovenia) Krim Ljubljana	20	24	44
(Germany) Borussia Dortmund	28	24	52
(Ukraine) Spartak Kyiv	25	19	44
(Hungary) Dunaferr Dunaújváros	24	24	48
(Russia) Rossiyanka Volgograd	32	19	51
(France) USM Gagny	22	14	36

Semifinals; March 18, 1995 – March 25, 1995
(Germany) TV Lützellinden	30	24	54
(Germany) Borussia Dortmund	24	24	48
(Hungary) Dunaferr Dunaújváros	24	20	44
(Russia) Rossiyanka Volgograd	19	23	42

Final; April 29, 1995 – May 6, 1995
(Germany) TV Lützellinden	25	18	43
(Hungary) Dunaferr Dunaújváros	23	26	49
