= 1989–90 IHF Women's Cup Winners' Cup =

The 1989–90 IHF Women's Cup Winners' Cup was the 14th edition of IHF's competition for European women's handball national cup champions.

Rostselmash defeated previous European Cup's semifinalist Debreceni VSC in the final, becoming the second Soviet team to win the Cup Winners' Cup. They previously defeated defending champion Ştiinţa Bacău in the quarterfinals. For the first time in the competition's history, the East German and West German sides, SC Magdeburg and VfL Oldenburg, faced each other, two months after the fall of the Berlin Wall, with Magdeburg making it to the quarterfinals.

== Results ==
Qualifying round October 21 – October 29, 1989
(Israel) Hapoel Petah Tikva	11	?
(Czechoslovakia) Iskra Partizánske	37	?
(Italy) HC Sassari	26	?
(Portugal) CD Paço de Arcos	22	?
(Romania) Terom Iaşi	33	27	60
(Turkey) Gazi Üniversitesi	15	18	33
(United Kingdom) Wakefield Metros	12	8	20
(Netherlands) Foreholte Voorhout	15	22	37
(East Germany) SC Magdeburg	41	40	81
(Cyprus) Philips College	14	10	24
(Belgium) Sasja Antwerpen	11	11	22
(West Germany) VfL Oldenburg	27	28	55
(Norway) Byåsen IL	?
(Denmark) GOG Gudme	?

Round of 16; January 13 – January 21, 1990
(Socialist Federal Republic of Yugoslavia) Radnički Belgrade	29	17	46
(Hungary) Debreceni VSC	21	33	54
(Czechoslovakia) Iskra Partizánske	?
(Italy) HC Sassari	?
(Romania) Terom Iaşi	30	26	56
(Netherlands) Foreholte Voorhout	17	20	37
(France) USM Gagny	28	24	52
(Spain) Estellés Tortajada	17	25	42
(Poland) Pogoń Szczecin	?
(Romania) Ştiinţa Bacău	?
(Bulgaria) Dimitrov Sofia	20	21	41
(Soviet Union) Rostselmash	31	38	69
(East Germany) SC Magdeburg	19	17	36
(West Germany) VfL Oldenburg	11	18	29
(Norway) Byåsen IL	?
(Austria) WAT Fünfhaus	?

Quarterfinals; March 14 – March 25, 1990
(Hungary) Debreceni VSC	31	21	52
(Czechoslovakia) Iskra Partizánske	19	21	40
(Romania) Terom Iaşi	24	23	47
(France) USM Gagny	14	17	31
(Romania) Ştiinţa Bacău	23	25	48
(Soviet Union) Rostselmash	24	28	52
(East Germany) SC Magdeburg	22	14	36
(Norway) Byåsen IL (a)	18	18	36

Semifinals; April 20 – April 28, 1990
(Hungary) Debreceni VSC	30	23	53
(Romania) Terom Iaşi	19	28	47
(Soviet Union) Rostselmash	25	18	43
(Norway) Byåsen IL	23	18	41

Final; May 20 – May 27, 1990
(Hungary) Debreceni VSC	21	18	39
(Soviet Union) Rostselmash	17	28	45
