= 1993–94 EHF Women's Cup Winners' Cup =

The 1993–94 EHF Women's Cup Winners' Cup was the 18th edition of the European competition for women's handball national cup champions, and the first one organized by EHF instead of IHF. It ran from September 25, 1993, to May 15, 1994.

TuS Walle-Bremen, a semifinalist in the previous European Cup, won its first European trophy and the second straight Cup Winners' Cup for Germany beating 1978 champion Ferencvárosi TC in the final. Lithuania and Macedonia made their debut in the competition as independent countries.

== Results ==
Preliminary round September 25 – October 2, 1993
(Luxembourg) HB Rumelange | 17 | 7 | 24
(Romania) Silcotex Zalău | 30 | 42 | 72
(Slovakia) Impex Topolniky | 44 | 27 | 71
(Israel) Hapoel Petah Tikva | 8 | 16 | 24
(Netherlands) VeL Geleen | 16 | 15 | 31
(Norway) Toten HK | 27 | 31 | 58
(Austria) Admira Landhaus | 25 | 18 | 43
(Iceland) Valur | 17 | 18 | 35
(Sweden) Västerås Irsta | 20 | 21 | 41
(Poland) Start Elblag | 18 | 24 | 42
(Lithuania) Žalgiris Kaunas | 17 | 18 | 35
(Turkey) Anadolu Üniversitesi | 27 | 24 | 51
(Denmark) Frederiksberg IF | 23 | 24 | 47
(Bulgaria) Gabrovo HC | 16 | 18 | 34
(Belgium) Apolloom Kortrijk | 16 | 20 | 36
(Italy) Jomsa Rimini | 27 | 30 | 57
(Switzerland) ATV Basel | 15 | 15 | 30
(Slovenia) Krim Ljubljana | 24 | 24 | 48
(North Macedonia) Uni Prokom Skopje | 29 | 26 | 55
(Portugal) Académico Madeira | 17 | 20 | 37
(Spain) Corteblanco Bidebieta | 14 | 24
(Croatia) Modea-Tuing Zagreb | 14 | 21
(France) USM Gagny | 28 | 31 | 59
(Greece) ASB Athinaikos | 10 | 13 | 23

Round of 16; October 30 – November 7, 1993
(Romania) Silcotex Zalău | 24 | 19 | 43
(Slovakia) Impex Topolniky | 15 | 23 | 38
(Norway) Toten HK | 37 | 28 | 65
(Austria) Admira Landhaus | 15 | 16 | 31
(Ukraine) Avtomobilist Brovary | 28 | 17 | 45
(Poland) Start Elblag (a) | 20 | 25 | 45
(Hungary) Spectrum Ferencváros | 42 | 24 | 66
(Turkey) Anadolu Üniversitesi | 17 | 17 | 34
(Germany) TuS Walle-Bremen | 32 | 30 | 62
(Denmark) Frederiksberg IF | 11 | 17 | 28
(Italy) Jomsa Rimini | 21 | 19 | 40
(Slovenia) Krim Ljubljana | 26 | 29 | 55
(Russia) Rostselmash | 28 | 20 | 48
(North Macedonia) Uni Prokom Skopje | 15 | 17 | 32
(Spain) Corteblanco Bidebieta | 18 | 18 | 36
(France) USM Gagny | 22 | 21 | 45

Quarterfinals; January 22–30, 1994
(Romania) Silcotex Zalău | 25 | 23 | 48
(Norway) Toten HK | 13 | 18 | 31
(Poland) Start Elblag | 21 | 20 | 41
(Hungary) Spectrum Ferencváros | 20 | 25 | 45
(Germany) TuS Walle-Bremen | 26 | 22 | 48
(Slovenia) Krim Ljubljana | 14 | 21 | 35
(Russia) Rostselmash | 21 | 23 | 45
(France) USM Gagny | 18 | 25 | 43

Semifinals; April 9–17, 1994
(Romania) Silcotex Zalău | 18 | 13 | 31
(Hungary) Spectrum Ferencváros | 17 | 23 | 40
(Germany) TuS Walle-Bremen | 25 | 25 | 50
(Russia) Rostselmash | 19 | 22 | 41

Final; May 8–15, 1994
(Hungary) Spectrum Ferencváros | 23 | 21 | 44
(Germany) TuS Walle-Bremen | 21 | 24 | 45
