= 1995–96 EHF Women's Cup Winners' Cup =

The 1995–96 EHF Women's Cup Winners' Cup was the 20th edition of EHF's competition for women's handball national cup champions. It ran from October 6, 1995, to May 12, 1996. Latvia made its debut, while Yugoslavia returned after 3 seasons of exclusion. Yugoslavia's Bolago Voždovac faced Croatia's Kras Zagreb in the same week the Croatian War ended, with the Croats making it to the quarterfinals.

The final confronted the 1991 European Cup and EHF Cup champions. TV Lützellinden, which had lost the final in the previous season, defeated Kras Zagreb to win its second Cup Winners' Cup and the last of its three European trophies. As of 2013 it remains the last German champion of the competition.

== Results ==
Round of 32; October 6–15, 1995
(Lithuania) Eglė Vilnius	15	23	38
(Russia) Rostselmash Rostov	24	30	54
(Belarus) Universitet Gomel	23	24	47
(North Macedonia) Pelister Bitola	25	31	56
(Denmark) Ikast FS	31	13	44
(Hungary) Vasas Budapest	20	27	47
(Italy) Jomsa Rimini	w/o
(Georgia (country)) HC Tbilisi
(Portugal) Académico Madeira	14	11	25
(Hungary) Dunaferr Dunaújváros	34	31	65
(Austria) KSV Kapfenberg	18	20	38
(Israel) Hapoel Petah Tikva	21	24	45
(Turkey) Eyüboglu Koleji	20	16	36
(Serbia and Montenegro) Bolago Voždovac	33	32	65
(Croatia) Kras Zagreb	28	15	43
(Romania) Rulmentul Brașov	14	24	38
(Slovenia) Branik Maribor	19	22	41
(Norway) Byåsen IL	32	25	57
(Iceland) Fram Reykjavík	19	24	43
(Belgium) HC Meeuwen	19	18	37
(Latvia) BTB Ludza	18	16	34
(Ukraine) Spartak Kyiv	38	42	80
(Bulgaria) Sportist Shumen	20	17	37
(Spain) Alcampo Leganés	26	36	62
(Slovakia) Jaspol Partizánske	15	17	32
(Germany) TV Lützellinden	29	25	54
(Luxembourg) HC Bascharage	13	15	28
(Greece) ASB Athinaikos	15	27	42
(Netherlands) AVV De Wolewijckers	26	21	47
(France) Stade Bethunois	24	26	50
(Poland) GKS Piotrkovia	23	23	46
(Switzerland) TSV Saint Othmar	20	22	42

Round of 16; November 10–19, 1995
(Russia) Rostselmash Rostov	24	27	51
(North Macedonia) Pelister Bitola	14	23	37
(Hungary) Vasas Budapest	30	16	46
(Italy) Jomsa Rimini	17	14	31
(Hungary) Dunaferr Dunaújváros	34	35	69
(Israel) Hapoel Petah Tikva	9	15	24
(Serbia and Montenegro) Bolago Voždovac	22	19	41
(Croatia) Kras Zagreb	19	23	42
(Norway) Byåsen IL	30	27	57
(Iceland) Fram Reykjavík	14	18	32
(Ukraine) Spartak Kyiv	30	29	59
(Spain) Alcampo Leganés	15	14	29
(Germany) TV Lützellinden	37	39	76
(Greece) ASB Athinaikos	10	13	23
(France) Stade Bethunois	19	25	44
(Poland) GKS Piotrkovia	20	18	38

Quarterfinals; January 14–21, 1996
(Russia) Rostselmash Rostov	24	14	38
(Hungary) Vasas Budapest (a)	17	21	38
(Hungary) Dunaferr Dunaújváros	26	19	45
(Croatia) Kras Zagreb	20	28	48
(Norway) Byåsen IL	24	22	46
(Ukraine) Spartak Kyiv	19	26	45
(Germany) TV Lützellinden	28	28	56
(France) Stade Bethunois	19	19	38

Semifinals; March 23–30, 1996
(Hungary) Vasas Budapest	25	11	36
(Croatia) Kras Zagreb	19	18	37
(Norway) Byåsen IL	18	23	41
(Germany) TV Lützellinden	27	31	58

Final; May 4–12, 1996
(Croatia) Kras Zagreb	19	22	43
(Germany) TV Lützellinden	28	22	50
