= 1979–80 IHF Women's Cup Winners' Cup =

The 1979–80 IHF Women's Cup Winners' Cup was the fourth edition of IHF's competition for European women's handball national cup champions. Running from 24 November 1979 to 30 March 1980, it was contested by 14 teams, one less than the preceding edition. East Germany, Hungary and the Soviet Union, which had dominated the three first editions, didn't take part in the competition.

The final, confronting Iskra Partizánske and Lokomotiva Zagreb, was decided in a penalty shootout as both games ended in a 16–16 draw. Iskra won the shootout to become the second Czechoslovak team to win a European women's handball trophy. As of 2013 it remains the only team from former Czechoslovakia that has won the Cup Winners' Cup.

== Results ==
First knockout round
(Austria) Admira Landhaus	9	4	13
(Romania) Confecția București	30	25	55
(Denmark) AIA Tranbjerg	31	19	50
(Belgium) Espérance Herstal	1	5	6
(Czechoslovakia) Iskra Partizánske	14	10	24
(Norway) Skjeberg IF	12	11	23
(West Germany) Gutsmuths Berlin	31	38	69
(Portugal) Atlético Almada	9	6	15
Standard Luxembourg	8	9	17
(Switzerland) RTV Basel	19	23	42
(Socialist Federal Republic of Yugoslavia) Lokomotiva Zagreb	13	13	26
(Bulgaria) CSKA Sofia	12	11	23
(Israel) Hapoel Ramat Gan	10	7	17
(France) Paris UC	15	20	35

Quarterfinals
(Romania) Confecția București	15	15	30
(Denmark) AIA Tranbjerg	13	13	26
(Czechoslovakia) Iskra Partizánske	23	18	41
(Netherlands) Quintus van der Voort	8	7	15
(West Germany) Gutsmuths Berlin	20	17	37
(Switzerland) RTV Basel	8	10	18
(Socialist Federal Republic of Yugoslavia) Lokomotiva Zagreb	20	13	33
(France) Paris UC	14	9	23

Semifinals
(Romania) Confecția București	13	11	24
(Czechoslovakia) Iskra Partizánske	13	18	31
(West Germany) Gutsmuths Berlin	8	9	17
(Socialist Federal Republic of Yugoslavia) Lokomotiva Zagreb	16	21	37

Final
(Czechoslovakia) Iskra Partizánske	16	16	32 (3)
(Socialist Federal Republic of Yugoslavia) Lokomotiva Zagreb	16	16	32 (2)
