= 1983–84 IHF Women's Cup Winners' Cup =

The 1983–84 IHF Women's Cup Winners' Cup was the eighth edition of IHF's competition for European women's handball national cup champions. As the previous edition, it was contested by 20 teams. Powerhouses East Germany and the Soviet Union didn't take part in the competition.

Dalma Split won its first European trophy, beating TJ Gottwaldov in the final. It was the third of five consecutive editions won by Yugoslav teams. Defending champion RK Osijek was knocked out by Gottwaldov in the quarterfinals.

== Results ==
=== Final stages ===
Preliminary round
(Austria) Admira Landhaus Wien	24	22	46
(Turkey) Arcelik Istanbul	19	11	30
(Spain) CB Leganés	23	20	43
(Portugal) Atlético Lisboa	15	13	28
(Belgium) Initia Hasselt	17	15	32
(Luxembourg) HB Dudelange	8	9	17
(Italy) Ariosto Ferrara	23	25	48
(Israel) Hapoel Ashdod	16	13	29

Round of 16
(Hungary) Épitők SC	24	19	43
(Sweden) Troja IF	19	15	34
(Norway) Sverresborg IF	27	23	50
(France) Paris UC	17	25	42
(West Germany) VfL Sindelfingen	16	18	34
(Denmark) Nørlem HK	19	19	38
(Bulgaria) Dimitrov Sofia	21	24	45
(Socialist Federal Republic of Yugoslavia) Dalma Split	19	27	46
(Austria) Admira Landhaus	20	23	43
(Spain) CB Leganés	9	21	30
(Belgium) Initia Hasselt	15	13	28
(Switzerland) Rex Zürich	12	11	23
(Czechoslovakia) TJ Gottwaldov	22	14	36
(Netherlands) Hellas Den Haag	15	15	30
(Italy) Ariosto Ferrara	20	14	34
(Socialist Federal Republic of Yugoslavia) RK Osijek	38	35	73

Quarterfinals
(Hungary) Épitők SC	27	19	46
(Norway) Sverresborg IF	17	16	33
(Denmark) Nørlem HK	20	12	32
(Socialist Federal Republic of Yugoslavia) Dalma Split	19	21	40
(Austria) Admira Landhaus	23	25	48
(Belgium) Initia Hasselt	15	14	29
(Czechoslovakia) TJ Gottwaldov	31	26	57
(Socialist Federal Republic of Yugoslavia) RK Osijek	17	20	37

Semifinals
(Hungary) Épitők SC	20	19	39
(Socialist Federal Republic of Yugoslavia) Dalma Split	22	27	49
(Austria) Admira Landhaus	16	12	28
(Czechoslovakia) TJ Gottwaldov	19	21	40

Final
(Socialist Federal Republic of Yugoslavia) Dalma Split	26	22	48
(Czechoslovakia) TJ Gottwaldov	15	18	33
