= 1990–91 IHF Women's Cup Winners' Cup =

European club handball tournament

The 1990–91 IHF Women's Cup Winners' Cup was the 15th edition of IHF's competition for European women's handball national cup champions.

Radnički Belgrade defeated 13-times European Cup champion Spartak Kyiv in the final to win its second Cup Winners' Cup, an overall fifth European trophy. This was the last edition where East Germany, one of the competition's powerhouses, was represented due to the reunification of Germany, signed few days after the preliminary round was played. Like in the previous season the ex-East and West German sides, SC Magdeburg and Buxtehuder SV, faced each other, with the latter winning this time.

== Results ==
Preliminary round September 23–30, 1990
(Luxembourg) HB Dudelange	2	7	9
(West Germany) Buxtehuder SV	41	43	84
(Belgium) Sporting Neerpelt	12	9	21
(Netherlands) PSV Eindhoven	19	29	48
(Denmark) Ribe HK	18	20	38
(Sweden) Saevsko Vaernamo	23	22	45
(Portugal) Colégio de Gaia	21	20	41
(Spain) Estellés Tortajada	37	21	58

Round of 12; January 11–20, 1991
(East Germany) SC Magdeburg	27	25	52
(Italy) Tiger Palermo	15	20	35
(Switzerland) BSV Weinfelden	16	10	26
(West Germany) Buxtehuder SV	26	24	50
(Soviet Union) Spartak Kyiv	25	?
(France) USM Gagny	22	?
(Romania) Ştiinţa Bacău	34	17	51
(Netherlands) PSV Eindhoven	17	19	36
(Sweden) Saevsko Vaernamo	17	23	40
(Poland) Pogoń Szczecin	18	17	35
(Spain) Estellés Tortajada	25	27	52
(Socialist Federal Republic of Yugoslavia) Radnički Belgrade	29	33	62
(Hungary) Debreceni VSC	32	30	62
(Austria) Union Hollabrun	14	23	37
(Norway) IL Gran	28	?
(Turkey) DSI Ankara	13	?

Quarterfinals; February 17–24, 1991
(East Germany) SC Magdeburg	21	13	34
(West Germany) Buxtehuder SV	16	23	39
(Soviet Union) Spartak Kyiv	21	21	42
(Romania) Ştiinţa Bacău	19	19	38
(Sweden) Saevsko Vaernamo	25	25	50
(Socialist Federal Republic of Yugoslavia) Radnički Belgrade	34	38	72
(Hungary) Debreceni VSC	33	23	66
(Norway) IL Gran	28	24	52

Semifinals; April 7–14, 1991
(West Germany) Buxtehuder SV	13	23	36
(Soviet Union) Spartak Kyiv	19	25	44
(Socialist Federal Republic of Yugoslavia) Radnički Belgrade	30	21	51
(Hungary) Debreceni VSC	21	23	44

Final; May 5–12, 1991
(Soviet Union) Spartak Kyiv	25	15	40
(Socialist Federal Republic of Yugoslavia) Radnički Belgrade	18	28	46
