= 1979 IHF Women's Cup Winners' Cup =

The 1979 IHF Women's Cup Winners' Cup was the third edition of IHF's competition for women's handball national cup champions. Contested by 15 teams, it ran from January 21 to April 29, 1979, and for the first time the final was a two-legged tie like the preceding rounds.

The final confronted the winners of the two previous editions. 1977 champion and 1978 European champion Berliner TSC defeated defending champion Ferencvárosi TC in both games to win its third consecutive, and final, European trophy.

== Results ==
First knockout round
(East Germany) Berliner TSC | 46 | 46 | 92
(Portugal) ES Vaz de Carvalho | 4 | 8 | 12
(Poland) AZS Wrocław | 18 | 14 | 32
(Bulgaria) VIF Georgi Dimitrov | 16 | 17 | 33
(Netherlands) Swift Roermond | 15 | 9 | 24
(West Germany) TuS Metzingen | 7 | 11 | 18
(Denmark) AIA Tranbjerg | 18 | 20 | 38
(Israel) Hapoel Ashdod | 8 | 7 | 15
(France) US Ivry | 18 | 12 | 30
(Czechoslovakia) Družstevnik Topolniky | 26 | 28 | 54
(Hungary) Ferencvárosi TC | 28 | 18 | 25
(Norway) Skoga IL | 13 | 10 | 25
(Austria) Admira Landhaus | 9 | 11 | 20
(Socialist Federal Republic of Yugoslavia) RK Osijek | 20 | 22 | 42

Quarter-finals
(East Germany) Berliner TSC | 22 | 16 | 38
(Bulgaria) VIF Georgi Dimitrov | 14 | 22 | 36
(Netherlands) Swift Roermond | 11 | 15 | 26
(Denmark) AIA Tranbjerg | 13 | 17 | 30
(Czechoslovakia) Družstevnik Topolniky | 15 | 16 | 31
(Soviet Union) Žalgiris Kaunas | 18 | 18 | 36
(Hungary) Ferencvárosi TC | 14 | 19 | 33
(Socialist Federal Republic of Yugoslavia) RK Osijek | 17 | 13 | 30

Semi-finals
(East Germany) Berliner TSC | 27 | 18 | 45
(Denmark) AIA Tranbjerg | 12 | 9 | 21
(Soviet Union) Žalgiris Kaunas | 17 | 13 | 30
(Hungary) Ferencvárosi TC | 14 | 19 | 33

Final
(East Germany) Berliner TSC | 20 | 20 | 40
(Hungary) Ferencvárosi TC | 15 | 15 | 30
