= 1980–81 IHF Women's Cup Winners' Cup =

The 1980–81 IHF Women's Cup Winners' Cup was the fifth edition of IHF's competition for European women's handball national cup champions. It was contested by 16 teams, two more than the previous edition.

1965 European Cup runner-up Spartacus Budapest defeated Bane Sekulić Sombor in the final to win its first European trophy, following the steps of Ferencvárosi TC as the second Hungarian team to win the Cup Winners' Cup.

== Results ==
Round of 16
(Bulgaria) Sportist Kremikovtsi	31	23	54
(Italy) GS Romano	6	14	20
(Austria) WAT Fünfhaus	11	10	21
(Netherlands) SEW Hoorn	9	14	23
(East Germany) Vorwärts Frankfurt	12	8	20
(Soviet Union) Rostselmash Rostov	8	11	19
(Hungary) Spartacus Budapest	20	11	31
(Czechoslovakia) Štart Bratislava	15	13	28
(West Germany) TuS Metzingen	10	11	21
(Denmark) AIA Tranbjerg	14	16	30
(Socialist Federal Republic of Yugoslavia) B. Sekulić Sombor	24	24	48
(Switzerland) ATV Basel	11	11	22
(Sweden) Västerås Irsta	13	19	32
(Norway) Nordstrand IF	9	13	22
(France) PLM Conflans	20	25	45
(Belgium) Avanti Lebbeke	10	12	22

Quarterfinals
(Bulgaria) Sportist Kremikovtsi	17	19	36
(Netherlands) SEW Hoorn	6	17	23
(East Germany) Vorwärts Frankfurt	15	12	27
(Hungary) Spartacus Budapest	11	17	28
(Denmark) AIA Tranbjerg	10	12	22
(Socialist Federal Republic of Yugoslavia) B. Sekulić Sombor	15	14	29
(Sweden) Västerås Irsta	19	15	34
(France) PLM Conflans	13	17	30

Semifinals
(Bulgaria) Sportist Kremikovtsi	21	13	34
(Hungary) Spartacus Budapest	27	16	43
(Socialist Federal Republic of Yugoslavia) B. Sekulić Sombor	25	20	45
(Sweden) Västerås Irsta	14	16	30

Finals
(Hungary) Spartacus Budapest	18	22	40
(Socialist Federal Republic of Yugoslavia) B. Sekulić Sombor	17	17	34
