= 1981–82 IHF Women's Cup Winners' Cup =

European women's handball competition

The 1981–82 IHF Women's Cup Winners' Cup was the sixth edition of IHF's competition for European women's handball national cup champions. It was contested by 18 teams, two more than the previous edition, so a preliminary round was introduced.

RK Osijek defeated defending champion Budapesti Spartacus in the final to become the first team from Yugoslavia to win Cup Winners' Cup, starting a 5-year period of Yugoslav hegemony in the competition.

== Results ==
=== Preliminary round ===
Local team	Aggregate	Away team	1st leg	2nd leg
Byåsen IL (Norway)	71–23	(Finland) Kronohagens IF	39–13	32–10
Avanti Lebbeke (Belgium)	22–29	(Israel) Hapoel Ashkelon	13–14	9–15

=== Final stages ===
Round of 16
(Soviet Union) Rostselmash	33	34	67
(France) PLM Conflans	8	16	24
(Austria) Post Vienna	16	22	38
(Bulgaria) Sportist Kremikovtsi	28	33	61
(Czechoslovakia) Štart Bratislava	15	26	41
(West Germany) VfL Oldenburg	13	10	23
(Romania) Terom Iaşi	25	15	40
(Hungary) Spartacus Budapest	19	24	43
(East Germany) Vorwärts Frankfurt	29	26	55
(Netherlands) PSV Eindhoven	13	12	25
(Norway) Byåsen IL	11	15	26
(Hungary) Épitők SC	15	25	40
(Socialist Federal Republic of Yugoslavia) RK Osijek	32	26	58
(Sweden) Västerås Irsta	19	14	33
(Denmark) AIA Tranbjerg	27	30	57
(Israel) Hapoel Ashkelon	8	13	21

Quarterfinals
(Soviet Union) Rostselmash	29	28	57
(Bulgaria) Sportist Kremikovtsi	13	19	32
(Czechoslovakia) Štart Bratislava	29	19	48
(Hungary) Spartacus Budapest	22	27	49
(East Germany) Vorwärts Frankfurt	22	22	44
(Hungary) Épitők SC	23	17	40
(Socialist Federal Republic of Yugoslavia) RK Osijek	31	19	50
(Denmark) AIA Tranbjerg	22	19	41

Semifinals
(Soviet Union) Rostselmash	31	19	50
(Hungary) Spartacus Budapest	27	23	50
(East Germany) Vorwärts Frankfurt	23	23	46
(Socialist Federal Republic of Yugoslavia) RK Osijek	19	28	47

Final
(Hungary) Spartacus Budapest	21	17	38
(Socialist Federal Republic of Yugoslavia) RK Osijek	27	27	54
