= Handball in Russia =

Handball has a rich history in Russia, dating back to the early 20th century when the sport was introduced to the country by European immigrants. However, it wasn't until the 1950s that handball began to gain popularity in Russia.

== Soviet Union Era ==
In the 1970s and 1980s, the Soviet Union dominated international handball competitions, winning several world championships one in men and three in women, in the Olympic they won two gold in women and three in men. Some of the most successful Soviet handball players of that era included Aleksandr Tuchkin, Andrey Lavrov, Aleksandr Anpilogov, Aleksandr Karshakevich, Serhiy Kushniryuk, Vladimir Kravtsov, Vyacheslav Atavin, Voldemaras Novickis.

== Present Russia ==
Following the collapse of the Soviet Union in 1991, Russia continued to be a strong force in international handball. The country's national handball team has won several medals in major international competitions, including the Olympics, World Championships, and European Championships.

In recent years, Russian handball has been dominated by clubs such as Lada Handball, Dinamo Volgograd, and Zvezda Zvenigorod which have won multiple titles in the EHF club Competitions.

Overall, handball has a strong following in Russia, with many talented players and teams competing at both the national and international levels.

== 2022 Suspension of Russia ==
In reaction to the 2022 Russian invasion of Ukraine, the International Handball Federation banned Russian and Belarus athletes and officials, and the European Handball Federation suspended the national teams of Russia and Belarus as well as Russian and Belarusian clubs competing in European handball competitions. Referees, officials, and commission members from Russia and Belarus will not be called upon for future activities. And new organisers will be sought for the YAC 16 EHF Beach Handball EURO and the Qualifier Tournaments for the Beach Handball EURO 2023, which were to be held in Moscow.
