= 1986–87 IHF Women's Cup Winners' Cup =

The 1986–87 IHF Women's Cup Winners' Cup was the 11th edition of IHF's competition for European women's handball national cup champions.

Kuban Krasnodar defeated 1977 and 1979 champion Berliner TSC in the final, becoming the first Soviet team to win the Cup Winners' Cup. Semifinalist Chimistul Râmnicu Vâlcea ended a 5-year period of Yugoslav hegemony in the competition beating ŽRK Voždovac in the quarterfinals.

== Results ==
(Hungary) Debreceni VSC	23	24	47
(Soviet Union) Kuban Krasnodar	24	29	53
(Soviet Union) Kuban Krasnodar	25	26	51
(Norway) Gjerpen IF	16	20	36
(Norway) Gjerpen IF	17	15	32
(France) ES Besançon	8	17	25
(Soviet Union) Kuban Krasnodar	30	23	53
(Switzerland) LC Brühl	28	27	56	(Sweden) Tyresö HF	17	19	36
(Luxembourg) HC Rumelange	5	13	18	(Switzerland) LC Brühl	12	12	24
(Sweden) Tyresö HF	18	24	42
(Sweden) Tyresö HF	26	13	39
(Spain) Mades Onda	24	20	44	(West Germany) VfL Engelskirchen	19	19	38
(Portugal) Liceu de Oeiras	8	13	21	(Spain) Mades Onda	18	14	32
(West Germany) VfL Engelskirchen	22	22	44
(Soviet Union) Kuban Krasnodar	21	23	44
(East Germany) Berliner TSC	17	23	40
(East Germany) Berliner TSC	29	17	46
(Denmark) Lyngså BK	13	18	31
(East Germany) Berliner TSC	23	18	41
(Netherlands) VeL Geleen	21	16	37	(Netherlands) VeL Geleen	17	17	34
(Belgium) Initia Hasselt	14	14	28	(Netherlands) VeL Geleen	29	27	56
(Italy) AS Roma	11	14	25
(East Germany) Berliner TSC (a)	15	18	33
(Romania) Chimistul Rm. Vâlcea	11	22	33
(Czechoslovakia) Iskra Partizánske	23	18	41
(Socialist Federal Republic of Yugoslavia) ŽRK Voždovac	21	26	47
(Socialist Federal Republic of Yugoslavia) ŽRK Voždovac	32	25	57
(Romania) Chimistul Rm. Vâlcea	26	33	59
(Austria) Admira Landhaus	14	27	41
(Austria) Admira Landhaus	27	?	(Romania) Chimistul Rm. Vâlcea	35	31	66
(Turkey) DSI Ankara	13	?
