= Silvia Navarro (handballer) =

Spanish handball player (born 1979)

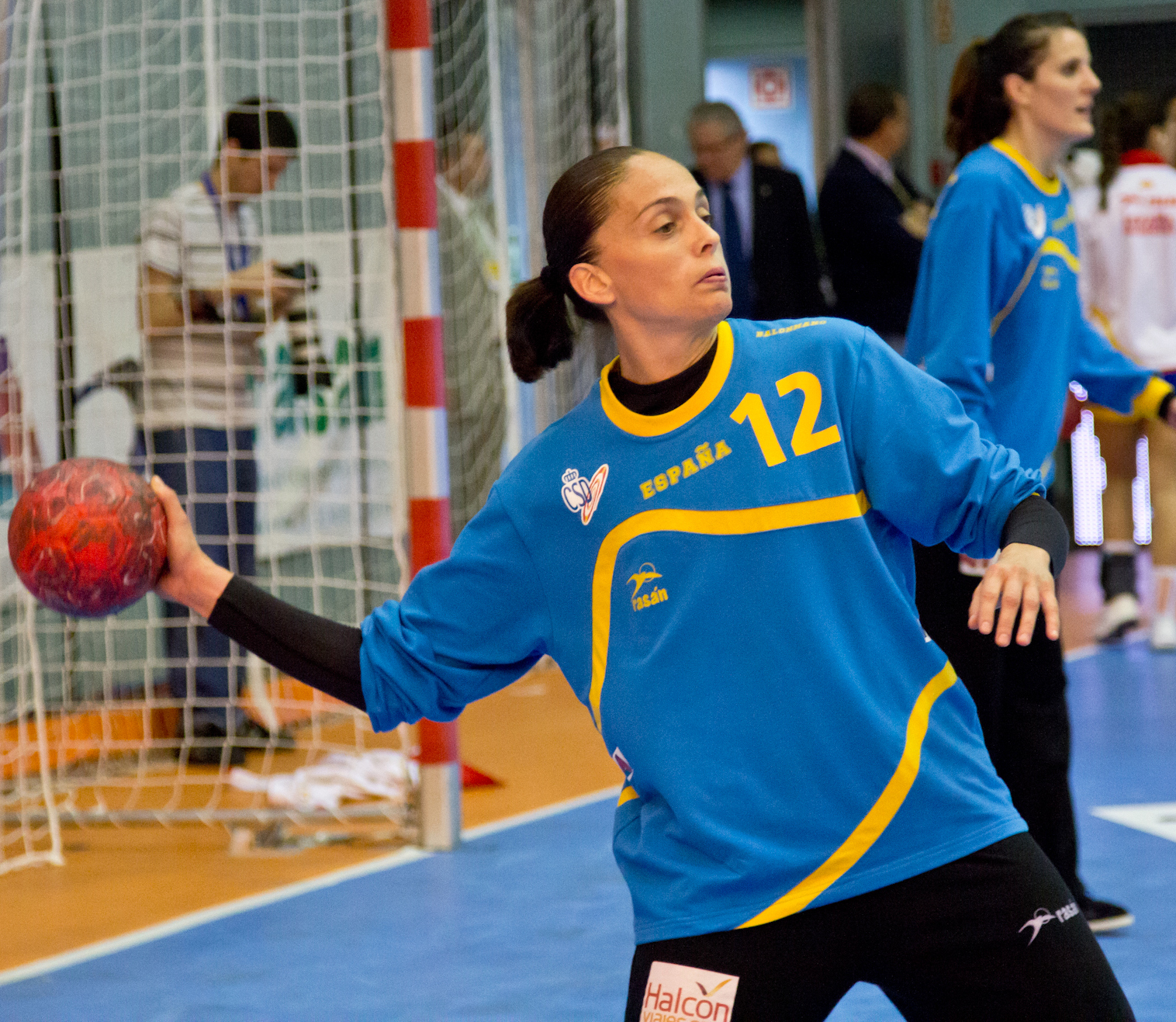
- Navarro in 2013

Personal information
- Full name: Silvia Navarro Giménez
- Born: 20 March 1979 (age 47) Valencia, Spain
- Height: 1.68 m (5 ft 6 in)

Sport
- Sport: Handball
- Position: Goalkeeper
- Current club: BM Remudas
- Number: 16

Senior clubs
- Years: Team
- 1997–1999: Milar L'Eliana
- 1999–2004: El Ferrobus Mislata
- 2004–2006: Astroc Sagunto
- 2006–2012: SD Itxako
- 2012–2013: CS Oltchim Râmnicu Vâlcea
- 2013–: BM Remudas
National team
Years	Team	Apps	(Gls)
1998–2020	Spain	249	(13)
Medal record
Olympic Games
Bronze medal – third place	2012 London	Team
World Championship
Silver medal – second place	2019 Japan
Bronze medal – third place	2011 Brazil
European Championship
Silver medal – second place	2014 Croatia/Hungary
- Updated on 5 September 2023

Silvia Navarro Giménez (born 20 March 1979) is a Spanish handball goalkeeper for BM Remudas and formerly the Spanish national team.

She holds two bronze medals from the 2011 World Championships and 2012 London Summer Olympics.

== Club ==
Navarro Gimenez followed ex-teammate Alexandrina Cabral Barbosa and signed for Romanian top club Vâlcea in May 2012.

== International championships ==
She competed internationally at the 2010 European Women's Handball Championship, where Spain placed 11th, and Navarro was listed among the top ten goalkeepers of the championship with a rate of 39%.

She competed at the 2011 World Women's Handball Championship, where Spain placed 3rd, and Navarro was listed first among the top ten goalkeepers of the championship with a rate of 46%.

At the 2012 Summer Olympics, Span won the bronze medal, Silvia Navarro was listed 4th among the top ten goalkeepers of the championship with a rate of 37%.

== Honours ==
Club

- EHF Champions League:
  - Finalist: 2011
  - Semi-finalist: 2013
- EHF Cup:
  - Winner: 2009
  - Finalist: 2008

National team

- World Championship:
  - Bronze Medallist: 2011
- European Championship:
  - Silver Medallist: 2008
- Olympics:
  - Bronze Medallist: 2012

=== Individual awards ===
- Carpathian Trophy Best Goalkeeper: 2013
- Bronze Medal of the Royal Order of Sports Merit
