= 1984–85 IHF Women's Cup Winners' Cup =

Handball Tournament in 1984-85

The 1984–85 IHF Women's Cup Winners' Cup was the ninth edition of IHF's competition for European women's handball national cup champions. 23 teams entered the competition, three more than the previous edition, but two of them withdrew.

Like in the previous season, the final confronted a Yugoslav and a Czechoslovak team, and Budućnost Titograd defeated Druzstevník Topolniky to clinch a fourth consecutive Cup Winners' Cup for Yugoslavia. It was their first European title and the first of their three trophies in this competition to date as of 2013. Defending champion Dalma Split was knocked out by semifinals Kuban Krasnodar in the Round of 16.

== Results ==
(Socialist Federal Republic of Yugoslavia) Dalma Split	27	25	52
(Soviet Union) Kuban Krasnodar	32	36	68	(Soviet Union) Kuban Krasnodar	28	28	56
(Turkey) Altay Izmir	6	17	23	(Soviet Union) Kuban Krasnodar	18	28	46
(Norway) Sverresborg IF	17	22	39
(Norway) Sverresborg IF	25	13	38
(Belgium) United Tongeren	8	7	15
(Soviet Union) Kuban Krasnodar	26	22	48
(Socialist Federal Republic of Yugoslavia) Budućnost Titograd	21	29	50
(Denmark) Gudum Nissum IF	14	12	26
(Luxembourg) Mersch 75	11	7	18	(East Germany) SC Magdeburg	16	23	39
(East Germany) SC Magdeburg	46	36	82	(East Germany) SC Magdeburg	30	12	42
(Socialist Federal Republic of Yugoslavia) Budućnost Titograd	19	27	46
(Romania) Chimistul Rm. Vâlcea	26	21	47
(Socialist Federal Republic of Yugoslavia) Budućnost Titograd	40	41	81	(Socialist Federal Republic of Yugoslavia) Budućnost Titograd	25	27	52
(Israel) Maccabu Ramat Gan	4	5	9	(Socialist Federal Republic of Yugoslavia) Budućnost Titograd	33	22	55
(Switzerland) Fides St. Gallen	23	15	38	(Czechoslovakia) Druzstevník Topolniky	18	18	36
(Italy) Cassano Magnago HC	19	22	41	(Italy) Cassano Magnago HC	25	18	43
(Austria) Admira Landhaus	18	23	41
(Italy) Cassano Magnago HC	21	20	41
(Bulgaria) CSKA Sofia	26	27	53
(Hungary) Bakony Vegyész	26	16	42
(Bulgaria) CSKA Sofia	16	27	43
(Bulgaria) CSKA Sofia	23	18	41
(Netherlands) Quintus van der Voort	15	14	29	(Czechoslovakia) Druzstevník Topolniky	19	22	41
(West Germany) VfL Sindelfingen	14	17	31	(West Germany) VfL Sindelfingen	21	10	31
(Portugal) AD Oeiras	18	6	24	(Spain) CD Hernani	10	11	21
(Spain) CD Hernani	14	16	30	(West Germany) VfL Sindelfingen	16	14	30
(Czechoslovakia) Druzstevník Topolniky	21	21	42
(Czechoslovakia) Druzstevník Topolniky	w/o
(Sweden) Spårvägens GoIF	(France) US Dunkerque
(France) US Dunkerque	w/o

== Winner ==
Budućnost Titograd, winner of the Cup Winners' Cup, was composed of:

- Mirjana Mugoša
- Katica Janković
- Ljiljana Mugoša
- Nataša Tomašević
- Stanka Mugoša-Božović
- Dragana Pešić
- Olga Pejović
- Mirsada Ganić
- Suzana Ganić
- Svetlana Mugoša
- Maja Bulatović
- Zorica Pavićević
- Željka Ratković
- Vesna Lekić
- Tanja Raonić
