= 1996–97 EHF Women's Cup Winners' Cup =

The 1996–97 EHF Women's Cup Winners' Cup was the 21st edition of EHF's competition for women's handball national cup champions. It ran from October 11, 1996, to May 11, 1997.

Istochnik Rostov, a semifinalist in the previous EHF Cup, defeated 1992 EHF Cup champion VfB Leipzig in the final, becoming the first Russian team to win the Cup Winners' Cup after the dissolution of the Soviet Union. As of 2013 it remains the last final played by a German team, after five consecutive appearances including three wins.

== Results ==
Preliminary round October 11–20, 1996
(Poland) GKS Piotrkovia	16	25	41
(Norway) Larvik HK	29	33	62
Austria Tabak	25	26	41
(North Macedonia) Mlaz Bogdanci	14	17	31
(Spain) Corteblanco Bidebieta	23	10	33
(Croatia) Karbon Zapresic	18	14	32
(Switzerland) TSV Saint Othmar	23	29	52
(Bulgaria) NSA Sofia	16	15	31
(Bosnia and Herzegovina) Željezničar Sarajevo	6	14	20
(Hungary) Dunaferr Dunaújváros	51	39	90
(Turkey) TMO Ankara	20	14	34
(Ukraine) Motor Zaporizhzhia	21	23	44
(Belgium) Fémina Visé	20	8	28
(Russia) Istochnik Rostov	29	36	65
(Israel) Kiryat Sharet Holon	20	15	35
(Slovenia) ZRK Zalec	36	31	67
(Netherlands) Anova Emmen	26	31	57
(Greece) GE Verias	18	28	46
(Serbia and Montenegro) Dunav Sombor	25	20	45
(France) ES Besançon	19	25	44
(Denmark) Frederiksberg IF	37	36	73
(Belarus) Universitet Gomel	18	20	38
(Georgia (country)) HC Kutaisi	10	8	18
(Romania) Agecom Baia Mare	51	45	96
(Italy) Polisportiva Enna	27	25	52
(Finland) Sparta Helsinki	31	34	65
(Portugal) Académico Madeira	21	16	37
(Luxembourg) HC Bascharage	11	19	30

Round of 16; November 9–17, 1996
(Norway) Larvik HK	34	32	66
Austria Tabak	12	10	22
(Spain) Corteblanco Bidebieta	22	23	45
(Switzerland) TSV Saint Othmar	16	17	33
(Hungary) Dunaferr Dunaújváros	20	22	42
(Ukraine) Motor Zaporizhzhia	22	23	45
(Russia) Istochnik Rostov	23	20	43
(Slovenia) ZRK Zalec	14	14	28
(Germany) TV Lützellinden	31	21	52
(Netherlands) Anova Emmen	20	16	36
(Serbia and Montenegro) Dunav Sombor	29	22	51
(Denmark) Frederiksberg IF	21	27	48
(Romania) Agecom Baia Mare	36	36	72
(Finland) Sparta Helsinki	19	29	48
(Germany) VfB Leipzig	35	22	57
(Portugal) Académico Madeira	12	22	34

Quarterfinals; February 8–16, 1997
(Norway) Larvik HK	30	22	52
(Spain) Corteblanco Bidebieta	17	22	39
(Ukraine) Motor Zaporizhzhia	18	12	30
(Russia) Istochnik Rostov	16	17	33
(Germany) TV Lützellinden	27	19	46
(Serbia and Montenegro) Dunav Sombor	23	25	48
(Romania) Agecom Baia Mare	26	16	42
(Germany) VfB Leipzig	19	26	45

Semifinals; March 29 – April 5, 1997
(Norway) Larvik HK	33	25	58
(Russia) Istochnik Rostov (a)	30	28	58
(Serbia and Montenegro) Dunav Sombor	23	21	44
(Germany) VfB Leipzig	18	33	51

Final; May 3–11, 1997
(Russia) Istochnik Rostov	25	24	49
(Germany) VfB Leipzig	18	24	42
