= Czechoslovak Women's Handball Championship =

The Czechoslovak women's handball championship was the premier championship for women's handball teams in Czechoslovakia. It was created in 1950 and dissolved in 1993.

In its early stages the championship was dominated by Czech teams, mostly Sparta Prague in the 1950s and Bohemians Prague in the 1960s. The tables were turned after Odeva Hlohovec became the first Slovak champion in 1969, with Slovak teams winning all remaining seasons except for two titles for TJ Gottwaldov in the 1970s and another one for Slavia Prague in 1991.

The championship was highly disputed from then on, and no team won three titles in a row after Bohemians. Odeva and Plastika Nitra, which were the leading teams in the early 1970s with three and two championships respectively, were followed by Inter Bratislava with three titles in the second half of the 1970s, Štart Bratislava which also won three until 1983, Iskra Partizánske and ZVL Prešov with four each in the 1980s, and lastly Slovan Dusľo Šaľa, which emerged in the early 1990s.

The championship was discontinued in 1993 after the Czechoslovak communist system collapsed and the country was dissolved, with the Czech Republic and Slovakia creating their own championships. In 2002 the WHIL, a supranational championship with the top Czech and Slovak teams, was created.

== Champions ==
- 1950 Sparta Prague
- 1951 not disputed
- 1952 not disputed
- 1953 Sparta Prague
- 1954 Sparta Prague
- 1955 Sparta Prague
- 1956 Lokomotiva Bratislava
- 1957–58 Sparta Prague
- 1958–59 Sparta Prague
- 1959–60 Slavia Prague
- 1960–61 Sparta Prague
- 1961–62 Sparta Prague
- 1962–63 Bohemians Prague
- 1963–64 Bohemians Prague
- 1964–65 Bohemians Prague
- 1965–66 Bohemians Prague
- 1966–67 Zora Olomouc
- 1967–68 Bohemians Prague
- 1968–69 Odeva Hlohovec
- 1969–70 Odeva Hlohovec
- 1970–71 Plastika Nitra
- 1971–72 Plastika Nitra
- 1972–73 Odeva Hlohovec
- 1973–74 TJ Gottwaldov
- 1974–75 Inter Bratislava
- 1975–76 Štart Bratislava
- 1976–77 TJ Gottwaldov
- 1977–78 Inter Bratislava
- 1978–79 Inter Bratislava
- 1979–80 Iskra Partizánske
- 1980–81 Iskra Partizánske
- 1981–82 Štart Bratislava
- 1982–83 Štart Bratislava
- 1983–84 ZVL Prešov
- 1984–85 Iskra Partizánske
- 1985–86 ZVL Prešov
- 1986–87 ZVL Prešov
- 1987–88 Iskra Partizánske
- 1988–89 ZVL Prešov
- 1989–90 Slovan Dusľo Šaľa
- 1990–91 Slavia Prague
- 1991–92 Slovan Dusľo Šaľa
- 1992–93 Slovan Dusľo Šaľa
