= 1978 IHF Women's Cup Winners' Cup =

Women's handball tournament

The 1978 IHF Women's Cup Winner's Cup was the second edition of IHF's competition for women's team handball national cup champions. It was contested by 15 teams, two more than the inaugural edition and ran from 22 January to 23 April 1978. Ferencvárosi TC tightly defeated the 2-time European champion SC Leipzig in the final to win its first international trophy.

== Bracket ==
First knockout round
1	(Netherlands) Swift Roermond	11	10	21
16	(Czechoslovakia) Inter Bratislava	6	18	24
8	(Norway) IF Sverreborg	28	23	51
9	(Israel) Hapoel Rahnana	7	0	7
5	(Hungary) Ferencvárosi TC	22	27	49
12	(Austria) Admira Landhaus	7	9	16
4	(Portugal) Mau de Carvalho	13	15	28
13	(France) EC Bordeaux	23	22	45
6
11
3	(Socialist Federal Republic of Yugoslavia) Željezničar Novi Sad	15	14	29
14	(West Germany) Eintracht Minden	13	15	28
7	(Denmark) GK Svendborg (a)	14	11	25
10	(Poland) AKS Chorzów	7	18	25
2	(Switzerland) DHC Zürich	14	6	20
15	(Bulgaria) CSKA Sofia	20	20	40

Quarter-finals
(Czechoslovakia) Inter Bratislava	21	13	34
(Norway) IF Sverreborg	8	7	15
(Hungary) Ferencvárosi TC	39	25	64
(France) EC Bordeaux	11	14	25
(East Germany) SC Leipzig	29	27	56
(Socialist Federal Republic of Yugoslavia) Željezničar Novi Sad	11	21	32
(Denmark) GK Svendborg	14	12	26
(Bulgaria) CSKA Sofia	9	15	24

Semi-finals
(Czechoslovakia) Inter Bratislava	20	11	31
(Hungary) Ferencvárosi TC	19	29	48
(East Germany) SC Leipzig	23	23	46
(Denmark) GK Svendborg	13	8	21

Final
(Hungary) Ferencvárosi TC	18
(East Germany) SC Leipzig	17
