= 1987–88 IHF Women's Cup Winners' Cup =

The 1987–88 IHF Women's Cup Winners' Cup was the 12th edition of IHF's competition for European women's handball national cup champions. It was contested by 22 teams, two more than the previous edition.

Defending champion Kuban Krasnodar again won the competition, beating 1982 European Cup champion Vasas Budapest in the final. Kuban was the second team to successfully defend the title.

== Results ==
Preliminary round
(Bulgaria) HC Lyulin	?
(Turkey) Arcelik Istanbul	?
(Spain) Mades Onda	14	?	?
(France) Stade Français	19	?	?
(Luxembourg) HB Dudelange	3	?	?
(Denmark) Lyngså BK	38	?	?
(Italy) Cassano Magnago	?
(Greece) Ginasio Verias	?
(Portugal) Ginásio do Sul	14	13	27
(Switzerland) ATV Basel	18	18	36
(Israel) Hapoel Ramat Gan	?	9	?
(Austria) WAT Fünfhaus	?	25	?

Round of 16
(Bulgaria) HC Lyulin	21	13	34
(France) Stade Français	21	12	33
(Czechoslovakia) Štart Bratislava	32	15	47
(Norway) Gjerpen IF (a)	24	23	47
(Denmark) Lyngså BK	21	21	42
(Soviet Union) Kuban Krasnodar	26	30	56
(Italy) Cassano Magnago	?
(Switzerland) ATV Basel	?
(East Germany) SC Leipzig	22	28	50
(Sweden) Skuru IK	11	18	29
(Romania) Mureșul Târgu Mureș	22	15	37
(Hungary) Vasas Budapest	19	21	40
(Austria) WAT Fünfhaus	16	16	32
(West Germany) TV Lützellinden	27	31	58
(Socialist Federal Republic of Yugoslavia) ŽRK Voždovac	26	23	49
(Netherlands) OSC Amsterdam	16	17	33

Quarterfinals
(Bulgaria) HC Lyulin	19	20	39
(Norway) Gjerpen IF	23	25	48
(Soviet Union) Kuban Krasnodar	32	36	68
(Italy) Cassano Magnago	17	15	32
(East Germany) SC Leipzig	24	15	39
(Hungary) Vasas Budapest	18	22	40
(West Germany) TV Lützellinden	32	15	47
(Socialist Federal Republic of Yugoslavia) ŽRK Voždovac	24	21	45

Semifinals
(Norway) Gjerpen IF	28	22	52
(Soviet Union) Kuban Krasnodar	32	26	58
(Hungary) Vasas Budapest	22	19	41
(West Germany) TV Lützellinden	15	21	36

Final
(Soviet Union) Kuban Krasnodar	28	20	48
(Hungary) Vasas Budapest	17	20	37
