= 1976–77 IHF Women's Cup Winners' Cup =

The 1976–77 IHF Women's Cup Winner's Cup was the first edition of IHF's competition for women's team handball national cup champions. It was contested by 13 teams and ran from 5 December 1977 to 29 April 1977. TSC Berlin defeated Spartak Baku in the final to become the competition's first champion.

== Results ==
Preliminary round
(Denmark) GOG Svendborg	12	10	22
(Hungary) Csepel SC	12	13	25
(East Germany) TSC Berlin	13	17	30
(Norway) Skjeberg IF	7	11	18
(Portugal) Os Belenenses	5	3	8
(Netherlands) Swift Roermond	28	31	59
(Israel) Hapoel Ashkelon	1	6	7
(West Germany) Gutsmuths Berlin	28	25	53
(Switzerland) DHC Zürich	10	14	24
(Czechoslovakia) Odeva Hlohovec	26	26	52

Quarterfinals
(Socialist Federal Republic of Yugoslavia) Željezničar Sarajevo	18	12	30
(Hungary) Csepel SC	17	16	33
(East Germany) TSC Berlin	20	18	38
(Netherlands) Swift Roermond	8	15	23
(Austria) Hypobank St. Polten	16	13	29
(Soviet Union) Spartak Baku	21	21	42
(West Germany) Gutsmuths Berlin	11	11	22
(Czechoslovakia) Odeva Hlohovec	9	12	21

Semi-finals
(Hungary) Csepel SC	14	11	25
(East Germany) TSC Berlin	19	26	45
(Soviet Union) Spartak Baku	29	9	38
(West Germany) Gutsmuths Berlin	12	7	19

Final
(East Germany) TSC Berlin	18
(Soviet Union) Spartak Baku	15
