= 1988–89 IHF Women's Cup Winners' Cup =

The 1988–89 IHF Women's Cup Winners' Cup was the 13th edition of IHF's competition for European women's handball national cup champions.

1986 European Cup runner-up Ştiinţa Bacău defeated defending champion Kuban Krasnodar in the final, becoming the first Romanian team to win the competition.

== Results ==
First preliminary round December 10 – December 17
(Portugal) SL Benfica	17	15	32
(Spain) CB Leganés	17	17	34
(Austria) Admira Landhaus	20	23	43
(Israel) Hapoel Petah Tikva	12	19	31
(Belgium) Sasja Antwerpen	12	8	20
(United Kingdom) Manchester United	7	14	21
(Switzerland) ATV Basel	15	17	32
(Czechoslovakia) TJ Gottwaldov	21	23	44
(Romania) Ştiinţa Bacău	38	38	76
(Turkey) Izmir Belediyesi	17	18	35
(Netherlands) VeL Geelen	29	24	53
(Luxembourg) HBC Bascharage	3	8	11
(Norway) Frederiksberg IF	20	?	?
(Sweden) IF Linköping	17	?	?

Second preliminary round January 15 – January 22
(Spain) CB Leganés	22	14	36
(Austria) Admira Landhaus	15	14	29
(United Kingdom) Manchester United	6	8	14
(Czechoslovakia) TJ Gottwaldov	23	25	48
(Romania) Ştiinţa Bacău	24	19	43
(East Germany) Empor Rostock	22	20	42
(Netherlands) VeL Geelen	13	19	32
(Sweden) IF Linköping	17	21	38

Quarterfinals; February 19 – February 26
(Spain) CB Leganés	19	20	39
(Socialist Federal Republic of Yugoslavia) Lokomotiva Zagreb	18	26	44
(Czechoslovakia) TJ Gottwaldov	23	19	42
(Soviet Union) Kuban Krasnodar	27	27	54
(Hungary) Vasas Budapest	21	20	41
(Romania) Ştiinţa Bacău	31	32	63
(Bulgaria) CSKA Sofia	29	22	51
(Sweden) IF Linköping	12	21	33

Semifinals; March 19 – March 26
(Socialist Federal Republic of Yugoslavia) Lokomotiva Zagreb	22	27	49
(Soviet Union) Kuban Krasnodar	25	35	60
(Romania) Ştiinţa Bacău	32	22	54
(Bulgaria) CSKA Sofia	20	22	42

Final; April 23 – May 1
(Soviet Union) Kuban Krasnodar	25	19	44
(Romania) Ştiinţa Bacău	25	22	47
