= HV Hellas Den Haag =

Dutch handball club

- Full name: HV Hellas Den Haag
- Founded: March 13, 1927; 98 years ago
- Arena: Sporthal Hellas, The Hague, South Holland
- Capacity: 1,400
- League: First team Men's : Eredivisie; Second team Men's: Eerste divisie Women: Hoofdklasse
- 2024-25: 2nd
- Club colours
Home	Away

Omnisportvereniging Hellas Den Haag is a Dutch handball club from The Hague (Den Haag).

Its women's team is one of the leading Dutch teams, with nine championships between 1955 and 2005. Its most successful period lasted from 1976 to 1982, with five championships and three appearances in the European Cup's quarter-finals (1977, 1978, 1982). Hellas returned to European competitions following the turn of the century, with appearances in the Champions League's qualifying stages, the Cup Winners' Cup and the EHF Cup.

== Titles ==
- Eredivisie
  - 1955, 1957, 1976, 1977, 1978, 1980, 1981, 2002, 2005
