= Tyresö HF =

Swedish handball club

- Full name: Tyresö Handbollsförening
- Short name: Tyresö HF
- Founded: 1970
- Arena: Tyresöhallen, Tyresö
- Capacity: 800
- League: Allsvenskan
- 2011–12: 4th
- Club colours
Home	Away

Tyresö HF is a Swedish women's handball club from Tyresö established in 1990, currently competing in the second-tier Allsvenskan. In 1986 it reached the IHF Cup's semifinals, and between 1987 and 1989 it won three national championships in a row. The team was relegated in 1995; it returned to the Elitserien in 2010, but it lost all 22 games and was again relegated.

Location of Tyresö HF

== Kits ==
HOME

2019–20

AWAY
2012–13	2019–20

== Titles ==
- Elitserien
  - 1987, 1988, 1989
