= CS Știința Bacău (women's handball) =

Romanian handball club

Știința Bacău
- Full name: Clubul Sportiv Știința Bacău
- Short name: Știința
- Founded: 1966
- Arena: Sala Orizont
- Capacity: 500
- President: (Romania) Florin Grapă
- League: Divizia A
- 2018–19: Divizia A, Seria A, 5th
- Club colours
Home	Away

Știința Bacău is a Romanian women's handball team based in Bacău, which competes in Divizia A, the second level of the Romanian women's handball championships.

The team represents the women's handball section of the multi-sport club CS Știința Bacău, which also include athletics, badminton, karate, women's and men's volleyball sections. The club also had men's football and handball sections in the past.

Location of CS Știința Bacău

== Kits ==
HOME
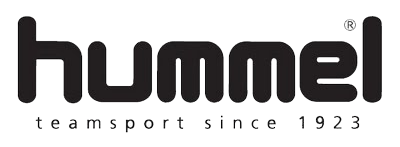
2018–19

AWAY
2016–17	2019–

== Honours ==
- Liga Naţională:
  - Winners (9): 1979, 1980, 1982, 1983, 1984, 1985, 1986, 1987, 1992
- Romanian Cup:
  - Winners (5): 1980, 1982, 1983, 1986, 1989
- EHF Champions League:
  - Winners (0):
  - Runners-up (1): 1985-86
- EHF Cup Winners' Cup:
  - Winners (1): 1988-89

=== European record ===
Season	Competition	Round	Club	Home	Away	Aggregate
1984–85	European Champions Cup	First round	(Turkey) Arçelik SK	30–16	37–14	67–30
1984–85	European Champions Cup	Round of 16	(Hungary) Budapesti Spartacus	29–22	27–31	56–53
1984–85	European Champions Cup	Quarter-finals	(Socialist Federal Republic of Yugoslavia) Radnički Belgrade	22–19	22–26	44–45
1985–86	European Champions Cup; Runners-up	Round of 16	(Sweden) Stockholmspolisens IF	34–18	21–18	55–36
1985–86	European Champions Cup; Runners-up	Quarter-finals	(Czechoslovakia) Iskra Partizánske	29–22	17–23	46–45
1985–86	European Champions Cup; Runners-up	Semi-finals	(Socialist Federal Republic of Yugoslavia) Budućnost Titograd	30–23	31–30	61–53
1985–86	European Champions Cup; Runners-up	Final	(Soviet Union) Spartak Kyiv	22–23	23–29	45–52
1986–87	European Champions Cup; Semi-finals	Round of 16	(Poland) Pogoń Szczecin	30–19	21–25	51–44
1986–87	European Champions Cup; Semi-finals	Quarter-finals	(East Germany) ASK Vorwärts Frankfurt/Oder	24–16	15–19	39–35
1986–87	European Champions Cup; Semi-finals	Semi-finals	(Soviet Union) Spartak Kyiv	—	—	Eliminated
1988–89	European Cup Winners' Cup; Winners	First round	(Turkey) İzmir Belediyesi SK	38–17	38–18	76–35
1988–89	European Cup Winners' Cup; Winners	Round of 16	(East Germany) SC Empor Rostock	24–22	19–20	43–42
1988–89	European Cup Winners' Cup; Winners	Quarter-finals	(Hungary) Vasas SC	32–20	31–21	63–41
1988–89	European Cup Winners' Cup; Winners	Semi-finals	(Bulgaria) HC CSKA Sofia	32–20	22–22	54–42
1988–89	European Cup Winners' Cup; Winners	Final	(Soviet Union) Kuban Krasnodar	22–19	25–25	47–44
1990–91	European Cup Winners' Cup	Round of 16	(Netherlands) PSV Eindhoven	34–17	17–19	51–36
1990–91	European Cup Winners' Cup	Quarter-finals	(Soviet Union) Spartak Kyiv	19–21	19–21	38–42
1991–92	European Cup Winners' Cup	Round of 16	(Ukraine) Spartak Kyiv	32–19	29–25	61–44
1991–92	European Cup Winners' Cup	Quarter-finals	(Socialist Federal Republic of Yugoslavia) Radnički Belgrade	26–21	18–25	44–46

== Famous players ==
- (Romania) Narcisa Lecușanu
- (Romania) Mariana Tîrcă
- (Romania) Laura Chiper
