= EHF Women's Cup Winners' Cup =

European women's handball competition

- Most recent season or competition: 2015–16 Women's EHF Cup Winners' Cup
- Sport: Handball
- Founded: 1976
- No. of teams: 32
- Country: EHF members
- Continent: Europe
- Most recent champion: SCM Craiova
- Most titles: (Hungary) Ferencváros (3) (Socialist Federal Republic of Yugoslavia) RK Radnicki Belgrade (3) (Socialist Federal Republic of Yugoslavia) (Serbia and Montenegro) (Montenegro) ŽRK Budućnost Podgorica (3)
- Related competitions: EHF Champions League; EHF Cup
- Website: EHF Cup Winners' Cup

The Women's EHF Cup Winners' Cup was the official competition for women's handball clubs of Europe that won their national cup, and took place every year from 1976 to 2016 (until 1993 organized by IHF instead of EHF). From the 2016–17 season, the competition will be merged with the EHF Cup.

== Summary ==
Year	Final			Semifinal losers
Year	Champion	Score	Second place
1976–77; Details	(East Germany); Berliner TSC	18–15	(Soviet Union); Spartak Baku	(Hungary); Csepel	(West Germany); Gutsmuths Berlin
1977–78; Details	(Hungary); Ferencváros	18–17	(East Germany); SC Leipzig	(Czechoslovakia); Inter Bratislava	(Denmark); GK Svendborg
1978–79; Details	(East Germany); Berliner TSC	40–30 (20–15, 20–15)	(Hungary); Ferencváros	(Denmark); AIA Tranbjerg	(Soviet Union); Žalgiris Kaunas
1979–80; Details	(Czechoslovakia); Iskra Partizánske	32–32 (PSO: 3–2) (16–16, 16–16)	(Socialist Federal Republic of Yugoslavia); Lokomotiva Zagreb	(Romania); Confecția Bucharest	(West Germany); Gutsmuths Berlin
1980–81; Details	(Hungary); Budapesti Spartacus	40–34 (18–17, 22–17)	(Socialist Federal Republic of Yugoslavia); Bane Sekulić Sombor	(Bulgaria); Sportist Kremikovtsi	(Sweden); Västerås Irsta
1981–82; Details	(Socialist Federal Republic of Yugoslavia); RK Osijek	54–38 (27–21, 27–17)	(Hungary); Budapesti Spartacus	(East Germany); Vorwärts Frankfurt	(Soviet Union); Rostselmash Rostov
1982–83; Details	(Socialist Federal Republic of Yugoslavia); RK Osijek	46–46 (21–27, 25–19)	(East Germany); SC Magdeburg	(Czechoslovakia); TJ Gottwaldov	(Soviet Union); Rostselmash Rostov
1983–84; Details	(Socialist Federal Republic of Yugoslavia); Dalma Split	48–33 (26–15, 22–18)	(Czechoslovakia); TJ Gottwaldow	(Hungary); Építők	(Austria); Admira Landhaus Wien
1984–85; Details	(Socialist Federal Republic of Yugoslavia); Budućnost Titograd	55–36 (33–18, 22–18)	(Czechoslovakia); Drustevnik Topolniki	(Soviet Union); Kuban Krasnodar	(Bulgaria); CSKA Sofia
1985–86; Details	(Socialist Federal Republic of Yugoslavia); Radnički Beograd	51–48 (24–25, 27–23)	(Germany); VfL Engelskirchen	(Soviet Union); Avtomobilist Baku	(Denmark); Rødovre HK
1986–87; Details	(Soviet Union); Kuban Krasnodar	44–40 (21–17, 23–23)	(East Germany); TSC Berlin	(Sweden); Tyresö HF	(Romania); Chimistul Râmnicu Vâlcea
1987–88; Details	(Soviet Union); Kuban Krasnodar	48–37 (28–17, 20–20)	(Hungary); Vasas	(Norway); Gjerpen IF	(West Germany); TV Giessen-Lützellinden
1988–89; Details	(Romania); Ştiinţa Bacău	47–44 (25–25, 22–19)	(Soviet Union); Kuban Krasnodar	(Bulgaria); CSKA Sofia	(Socialist Federal Republic of Yugoslavia); Lokomotiva Zagreb
1989–90; Details	(Soviet Union); Rostselmash Rostov	45–39 (17–21, 28–18)	(Hungary); Debrecen	(Norway); Byåsen IL	(Romania); Terom Iaşi
1990–91; Details	(Socialist Federal Republic of Yugoslavia); Radnički Beograd	46–40 (17–21, 28–18)	(Soviet Union); Spartak Kyiv	(Hungary); Debrecen	(Germany); Buxtehuder SV
1991–92; Details	(Socialist Federal Republic of Yugoslavia); Radnički Beograd	45–45 (24–19, 21–26)	(Hungary); Debrecen	(Germany); Bayer Leverkusen	(Norway); Byåsen IL
1992–93; Details	(Germany); TV Giessen-Lützellinden	48–43 (23–21, 25–22)	(Russia); Rostselmash Rostov	(Romania); Chimistul Râmnicu Vâlcea	(Ukraine); Motor Zaporizhzhia
1993–94; Details	(Germany); TuS Walle Bremen	45–44 (21–23, 24–21)	(Hungary); Ferencváros	(Romania); Silcotex Zalău	(Russia); Rostselmash Rostov
1994–95; Details	(Hungary); Dunaújváros	49–43 (23–25, 26–18)	(Germany); TV Giessen-Lützellinden	(Germany); Borussia Dortmund	(Russia); Rossijanka Volgograd
1995–96; Details	(Germany); TV Giessen-Lützellinden	50–41 (28–19, 22–22)	(Croatia); Kraš Zagreb	(Hungary); Vasas	(Norway); Byasen Idrettslag
1996–97; Details	(Russia); Istochnik Rostov	49–42 (25–18, 24–24)	(Germany); VfB Leipzig	(Norway); Larvik HK	(Serbia and Montenegro); ZRK "Sombor Dunav"
1997–98; Details	(Norway); Baekkelagets Oslo	51–40 (23–23, 28–17)	(Croatia); Kraš Zagreb	(Germany); Borussia Dortmund	(Romania); Silcotub Zalău
1998–99; Details	(Norway); Baekkelagets Oslo	50–35 (26–13, 24–22)	(Spain); Ferrobus Mislata Tortajada	(France); ASPTT Metz	(Denmark); Frederiksberg IF
1999–00; Details	(Spain); Milar L'Eliana Valencia	62–54 (31–24, 31–30)	(Russia); Kuban Krasnodar	(Denmark); Ikast Bording	(Ukraine); Spartak Kyiv
2000–01; Details	(Ukraine); Motor Zaporizhzhia	49–38 (26–20, 23–18)	(Norway); Nordstrand 2000, Oslo	(France); E.S.B.F. Besançon	(Romania); Silcotub Zalau
2001–02; Details	(Russia); Lada Togliatti	55–52 (27–32, 28–20)	(Romania); CS Oltchim Râmnicu Vâlcea	(Poland); Zaglebie Lubin	(Spain); Alsa Elda Prestigio
2002–03; Details	(France); E.S.B.F. Besançon	47–45 (27–30, 20–15)	(Ukraine); Spartak Kyiv	(Hungary); Győr	(Denmark); Kolding IF
2003–04; Details	(Denmark); Ikast Bording EH	66–57 (30–35, 36–22)	(Austria); Hypo Niederösterreich	(Denmark); FCK Handbold	(France); Handball Metz Metropole
2004–05; Details	(Norway); Larvik HK	68–53 (31–26, 37–27)	(Croatia); Podravka Vegeta	(Norway); Tertnes Bergen	(Germany); 1. FC Nürnberg
2005–06; Details	(Serbia and Montenegro); ŽRK Budućnost	51–48 (25–25, 26–23)	(Hungary); Győr	(Norway); Gjerpen Handball Skien	(Norway); Larvik HK
2006–07; Details	(Romania); CS Oltchim Râmnicu Vâlcea	59–53 (30–24, 29–29)	(Norway); Byasen HB Elite Trondheim	(Hungary); Ferencváros	(Spain); Cem. la Union-Ribarroja
2007–08; Details	(Norway); Larvik HK	50–40 (25–21, 25–19)	(Romania); CS Rulmentul-Urban Braşov	(Croatia); Podravka Vegeta	(Spain); AKABA BeraBera
2008–09; Details	(Denmark); FCK Handbold	47–44 (21–23, 26–21)	(Norway); Larvik HK	(Germany); TSV Bayer 04 Leverkusen	(Norway); Gjerpen Handball
2009–10; Details	(Montenegro); ŽRK Budućnost	41–36 (23–20, 18–16)	(Denmark); KIF Vejen	(Germany); VfL Oldenburg	(France); Metz Handball
2010–11; Details	(Hungary); Ferencváros	57–52 (34–29, 23–23)	(Spain); CB Mar Alicante	(Sweden); LUGI HF	(France); Metz Handball
2011–12; Details	(Hungary); Ferencváros	62–60 (31–30, 31–30)	(Denmark); Viborg HK	(Russia); Dinamo Volgograd	(Germany); HC Leipzig
2012–13; Details	(Austria); Hypo Niederösterreich	61–43 (30–22, 31–21)	(France); Issy-Paris Hand	(Germany); Thüringer HC	(Russia); Rostov-Don
2013–14; Details	(Denmark); Viborg HK	55–45 (31–22, 24–23)	(Russia); Zvezda Zvenigorod	(Norway); Byasen Trondheim	(Russia); Rostov-Don
2014–15; Details	(Denmark); Midtjylland	46–42 (22–23, 24–19)	(France); Fleury Loiret	(Hungary); Ferencváros	(Austria); Hypo Niederösterreich
2015–16; Details	(Denmark); Team Tvis Holstebro	61–52 (31–27, 30–25)	(Russia); Lada Togliatti	(France); Issy Paris	(Slovenia); RK Krim

== Records and statistics ==
=== Winners ===
Club	Winners	Runners-up	Years won	Years runners-up
(Hungary) Ferencváros	3	2	1978, 2011, 2012	1979, 1994
(Socialist Federal Republic of Yugoslavia) Radnički Beograd	3	0	1986, 1991, 1992	
(Montenegro) Budućnost	3	0	1985, 2006, 2010	
(Russia) Kuban Krasnodar	2	2	1987, 1988	1989, 2000
(East Germany) Berliner TSC	2	1	1977, 1979	1987
(Germany) TV Lützellinden	2	1	1993, 1996	1995
(Russia) Rostov-Don	2	1	1990, 1997	1993
(Norway) Larvik HK	2	1	2005, 2008	2009
(Socialist Federal Republic of Yugoslavia) Osijek	2	0	1982, 1983	
(Norway) Bækkelagets SK	2	0	1998, 1999	
(Denmark) Midtjylland	2	0	2004, 2015	
(Hungary) Budapesti Spartacus	1	1	1981	1982
(Romania) Râmnicu Vâlcea	1	1	2007	2002
(Austria) Hypo Niederösterreich	1	1	2013	2004
(Denmark) Viborg HK	1	1	2014	2012
(Russia) Lada Togliatti	1	1	2002	2016
(Denmark) Team Tvis Holstebro	1	0	2016	
(Czechoslovakia) Slávia Partizánske	1	0	1980	
(Socialist Federal Republic of Yugoslavia) Dalma Split	1	0	1984	
(Romania) Știința Bacău	1	0	1989	
(Germany) TuS Walle Bremen	1	0	1994	
(Hungary) Dunaújváros	1	0	1995	
(Spain) Mar Valencia	1	0	2000	
(Ukraine) Motor Zaporizhzhia	1	0	2001	
(France) Besançon	1	0	2003	
(Denmark) FC København	1	0	2009	

=== Winners by country ===
#	Country	Winners	Runners-up	Total finals
1	Yugoslavia	7	2	9
2	Hungary	5	7	12
3	Denmark	5	2	7
4	Norway	4	3	7
5	Germany	3	3	6
5	Soviet Union	3	3	6
7	Russia	2	4	6
8	East Germany	2	3	5
9	Romania	2	2	4
10	Montenegro	2	0	2
11	Czech Republic	1	2	3
11	Spain	1	2	3
11	France	1	2	3
14	Austria	1	1	2
14	Ukraine	1	1	2
16	Croatia	0	3	3
Total		40	40	80

== See also ==
- Women's EHF Champions League
- Women's EHF Cup
- Women's EHF Challenge Cup
