= Västerås HF =

Swedish handball club

Västerås HF was a Swedish handball club based in Västerås. The club was founded in 1934. In 1942–43, the club made its debut in both the top division, Allsvenskan, and Svenska mästerskapet (SM), the tournament held to determine the Swedish champions. They finished fifth in the league, and reached the SM final, where they were defeated by Majornas IK. In the following season they reached the semifinals in SM, but were again defeated by Majornas IK. They reached the SM quarterfinals in 1945–46, 1946–47 and 1947–48. In 1947–48 they were also relegated from the top division and never returned. They reached the semifinals in SM in 1949–50, where they lost against Örebro SK. Västerås HF reached the SM quarterfinals in 1950–51 and 1951–52, after which the tournament was discontinued and the Swedish champions were determined by the league.

In later years, the club had a cooperation with Irsta HF, with the clubs running a joint first team under the name Irsta Västerås Handboll. The team, which counted as a continuation of Irsta HF, played in the top division in 2004–05, but were relegated after one season. Irsta HF later withdrew from the cooperation and Västerås HF continued to run the first team with the name IVH Västerås. IVH Västerås merged with Irsta HF in 2011 to form the club VästeråsIrsta HF. The club played in the top division in 2012–13, but as of 2017–18 they play in Division 1, the third level.

During their Allsvenskan years, Västerås HF had a notable rivalry with 1938 Swedish champions Västerås IK.

== Team ==
=== Current squad ===
Squad for the 2025–26 season

Goalkeepers
Left Wingers

- (Sweden) Jesper Filén

Right Wingers
Line players

Left Backs

- (Sweden) William Hermansson

Central Backs
Right Backs

=== Transfers ===
Transfers for the 2026–27 season

Joining

Leaving

- (Norway) Thomas Stenersen (LB) to (Sweden) IFK Skövde
- (Sweden) Alexander Skoog (GK) to (Sweden) IFK Kristianstad
- (Sweden) Alex Andersson (CB) to (Sweden) HF Karlskrona

=== Transfer History ===
Transfers for the 2025–26 season

Joining

- (Norway) Thomas Stenersen (LB) from (Norway) Follo HK
- (Sweden) Jesper Filén (LW) from (Sweden) Önnereds HK
- (Sweden) William Hermansson (LB) from (Sweden) Kungälvs HK

Leaving

- (Sweden) Tobias Trommler (LP) loan back to (Sweden) IK Sävehof
