= CB Amadeo Tortajada =

Spanish handball club

- Full name: Club de Balonmano Amadeo Tortajada
- Short name: Amadeo Tortajada
- Founded: 1975
- Dissolved: 2009
- Arena: Pabellón Municipal, Riba-roja de Túria
- Capacity: 1,000
- Head coach: Gregorio García (ESP)
- 2008–09: Liga ABF, 12th
- Club colours
Home	Away

Club Balonmano Amadeo Tortajada was a handball team from Mislata, Valencia. Founded in 1975 in the Amadeo Tortajada school in Mislata, the team was better known for its sponsorship names: Constructora Estellés, Valencia Urbana, Ferrobús Mislata and lastly Cementos La Unión Ribarroja. Under the latter the team was relocated in 2004 to Riba-roja de Túria.

Amadeo Tortajada was one of the leading Spanish teams, winning two national championships in 2006 and 2007, and five national cups between 1990 and 2006. It first made an impression in European competitions reaching the EHF Cup's semifinals in 1994 and 1996, and it subsequently made its debut in the Champions League in 1998, was the Cup Winners' Cup's runner-up in 1999 and became the first Spanish team to win the EHF Cup in 2000, also attaining a bronze medal in the subsequent Champions Trophy. It subsequently played the Champions League in five occasions, reaching the quarter-finals in 2002.

Amadeo Tortajada collapsed financially in 2009, just three years after winning a double, and was disbanded following the end of the season.

== Trophies ==
- División de Honor Femenina: 2
  - 2006, 2007
- Copa de la Reina: 5
  - 1990, 2001, 2003, 2004, 2006
- Supercopa de España: 2
  - 2003, 2006
- EHF Cup: 1
  - 2000

== Notable former players ==
- (Norway) Isabel Blanco
- (Norway) Anne Jorunn Kristensen
- (Germany) Bianca Urbanke
- (Denmark) Maja Grønbæk
- (Denmark) Winnie Mølgaard
- (Spain) Marta Mangué
- (Spain) Silvia Navarro
- (Spain) Patricia Alonso
- (Russia) Svetlana Bogdanova
- (Brazil) Chana Masson
