= HK Slávia Partizánske =

- Full name: Hádzanársky Klub Slávia Partizánske
- Short name: Slávia Partizánske
- Founded: 1965
- Arena: Partizánske Sports Hall, Partizánske
- Capacity: 1200
- President: Ján Hullman
- Head coach: Milan Adi
- League: 1.Slovenská liga
- 2012–13: WHIL, 7th Slovak play-offs, 3rd
- Club colours
Home	Away

HK Slávia Partizánske, also known as Danlog Partizánske for sponsorship reasons, is a Slovak women's handball club from Partizánske. Founded in 1965 as TJ Iskra Partizánske, it took its current name in 1997. It currently competes in the WHIL.

After debuting in the Czechoslovak Championship in 1975, Iskra rose to the top between 1979 and 1981, winning in this period two championships, one national cup and most notably the 1980 IHF Cup Winners' Cup, beating Lokomotiva Zagreb in the final on penalties. As of 2013 it remains the only EHF women's trophy won by a Slovak team, as well as the only Cup Winners' Cup won by a team from former Czechoslovakia. Iskra won two more Czechoslovak championships in 1985 and 1988, and in 1992 it reached the IHF Cup's final, lost to HC Leipzig.

Following the dissolution of Czechoslovakia, the team won its only Slovak championship to date in 1994, followed by two national cups in 1995 and 1999. The following decade wasn't successful and Slávia's fourth cup came in 2011. The following year it made it into the Slovak championship's three top teams for the first time since 1996.

== Titles ==
- EHF Cup Winners' Cup (1)
  - 1980
- Czechoslovak Championship (4)
  - 1980, 1981, 1985, 1988
- Slovak Extraliga (1)
  - 1994
- Slovak Cup (4)
  - 1979, 1995, 1999, 2011
