= HC Spartak Kyiv =

Ukrainian handball club from Kyiv

- Full name: HC Spartak Kyiv
- Short name: Spartak Kyiv
- Founded: 1962
- Arena: BVUFK Sport Palace, Brovary
- League: Ukrainian Super League
- Club colours
Home	Away

HC Spartak Kyiv (ukrainian: ХК Спартак Київ) is a Ukrainian women's handball club from Kyiv. It used to be a member of the Spartak VSS during the Soviet era.

== History ==
Spartak was arguably the best team in Europe between the 1970s and the late-1980s, with a record 13 European Cups in addition to twenty Soviet Championships in a row. The 1989 final lost to emerging Austrian powerhouse Hypo Niederösterreich marked Spartak's last appearance in the competition.

Following the collapse of the Soviet Union the team declined. It has since won three Ukrainian championships, most recently in 2000. However, in 2003 it enjoyed a last European success reaching the Cup Winner's Cup's final. In recent seasons it has appeared in the Challenge Cup.

== Achievements ==
=== International competitions ===
- European Cup
  - Winner (13): 1969–70, 1970–71, 1971–72, 1972–73, 1974–75, 1976–77, 1978–79, 1980–81, 1982–83, 1984–85, 1985–86, 1986–87, 1987–88
  - Runner-up (2): 1973–74, 1988–89
  - not participating : 1976, 1978, 1980 and 1984
- Cup Winners Cup
  - Runner-up (1): 1990–91, 2002–03
- IHF Cup
  - Runner-up (1): 1989–90

=== National competitions ===
- Soviet Championship
  - Winner (20): 1969-1988
  - Runner-up (3): 1967, 1990, 1991
  - Third place (2): 1968, 1989
- Ukrainian Super League
  - Winner (3): 1992, 1996, 2000
  - Runner-up (9): 1994, 1995, 1998, 1999, 2001-2004, 2006
  - Third place (3): 1993, 2005 2012
