= ŽRK Radnički Belgrade =

Serbian handball club

- Full name: Ženski rukometni klub Radnički Belgrade
- Founded: 1949
- President: Ivan Mijatović
- League: Handball League of Serbia
- Club colours

ŽRK Radnički Belgrade (Serbian Cyrillic: Женски рукометни клуб Раднички Београд) is a women's handball club from Belgrade, Serbia. Currently, ŽRK Radnički Belegrade competes in the Handball League of Serbia. ŽRK Radnički Belegrade is the most successful Serbian women's handball club.

== Achievements ==
- EHF Women's Champions League :
  - Winners (3) : 1975/76, 1979/80, 1983/84
  - Runner-up (4) : 1980/81, 1981/82, 1982/83, 1984/85
  - Semi finalist (2) : 1973/74, 1976/77
- EHF Women's Cup Winners' Cup :
  - Winners (3) : 1985/86, 1990/91, 1991/92
- National Championship :
  - Winners (14) : 1972, 1973, 1975, 1976, 1977, 1978, 1979, 1980, 1981, 1982, 1983, 1984, 1986, 1987
- National Cup :
  - Winners (13) : 1970, 1973, 1975, 1976, 1979, 1983, 1985, 1986, 1990, 1991, 1992, 1994, 2003

== Notable former players ==
- Svetlana Kitić - In 2010, she was voted the best female handball player ever by the International Handball Federation
- Slavica Đukić - Olympic Gold Medalist
- Dragica Đurić - Olympic Gold Medalist
- Mirjana Đurica - Olympic Silver and gold medalist
- Radmila Drljača - Olympic Silver Medalist
- Emilija Erčić - Olympic Gold Medalist
- Ljubinka Janković - Olympic Gold Medalist
- Slavica Jeremić - Olympic Silver Medalist
- Vesna Radović - Olympic Silver and gold medalist
- Bojana Radulović - Olympic Silver Medalist (with Hungary)
- Nataliya Matryuk - Olympic Bronze Medalist (with Unified team)
- Andrea Lekić
- Sanja Damnjanović
- Tatjana Polajnar (Tanja Polajnar)
- Svetlana Ognjenović
- Jelena Erić (Jelena Rakonjac)
- Stana Vuković
- Mirjana Milenković
- Vesna Buđa
- Ivanka Šuprinović
- Milenka Sladić
- Mira Radaković
- Jadranka Antić
- Milena Delić
- Ljiljana Knežević
- Marica Rogić
- Ljubica Bukurov
- Dušanka Lazarević
- Zdenka Leutar
- Marina Dmitrović
