= TV Lützellinden =

German sports club

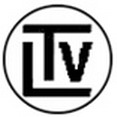
Team logo

TV Lützellinden 1904 e.V., also known as TV Giessen-Lützellinden, was a German sports club from Giessen best known for its women's handball team. It was established in 1904.

Lützellinden won seven national championships and five national cups between 1988 and 2001, which makes it the Bundesliga's most successful team after Bayer Leverkusen. In 1991 it reached the European Cup's final and defeated defending champion Hypo Niederösterreich to become the first ex-West German club to win the major European trophy. Lützellinden also reached the final the following year, but lost to Niederösterreich. In 1993 Lützellinden won its second EHF trophy, the Cup Winners' Cup, beating Rostselmash in the final. It subsequently reached the 1994 Champions League's semifinals and the 1995 Cup Winners' Cup's final, lost to Dunaújvárosi NKS, before winning its second Cup Winners' Cup in 1996 over Kraš Zagreb. Its best results in its seven last international appearances, between 1997 and 2003, was reaching the 2002 EHF Cup's semifinals.

The club has the record for the biggest win in the Bundesliga with 45 goals over TuS Walle Bremen on 22 May 1991.

In 2004 Lützellinden was relegated to the Regionalliga for financial trouble, and two years later it was disbanded. A new club was created, TSV 2006 Lützellinden.

== Titles ==
- European Cup (1)
  - 1991
- Cup Winners' Cup (2)
  - 1993, 1996
- Bundesliga (7)
  - 1988, 1989, 1990, 1993, 1997, 2000, 2001
- DHB-Pokal (5)
  - 1989, 1990, 1992, 1998, 1999
