= 2011–12 EHF Women's Champions League group stage and main round =

The group stage and main round ran from 1 October 2011 until 11 March 2012.

== Group stage ==
The qualified teams were seeded in four pots. The group stage of the 2011–12 EHF Women's Champions League was held from 29 September 2011 till 13 November 2012. The top two teams advanced to the second round.

=== Seedings ===
Pot 1	Pot 2	Pot 3	Pot 4
(Norway) Larvik HK (Denmark) FC Midtjylland Håndbold (Hungary) Győri Audi ETO KC (Romania) CS Oltchim Rm. Vâlcea	(Montenegro) Budućnost Podgorica (Austria) Hypo Niederösterreich (Slovenia) Krim Ljubljana (Spain) Itxako Reyno de Navarra	(Russia) Dinamo Volgograd (Germany) Thüringer HC (France) Metz Handball (Croatia) Podravka Koprivnica	(Denmark) Viborg HK (Norway) Byåsen HE (Germany) Buxtehuder SV (Denmark) Randers HK

=== Group A ===
Team	Pld	W	D	L	GF	GA	GD	Pts	ZRK	FCM	BIL	THC
(Montenegro) Budućnost Podgorica	6	5	0	1	172	149	+23	10	—	28–25	28–18	35–25
(Denmark) FC Midtjylland Håndbold	6	4	0	2	146	127	+19	8	34–20	—	18–21	23–20
(Norway) Byåsen HE	6	2	1	3	131	149	−18	5	24–34	17–19	—	23–22
(Germany) Thüringer HC	6	0	1	5	139	163	−24	1	23–27	21–27	28–28	—

1 October 2011; 16:15	Byåsen HE (Norway)	17 – 19	(Denmark) FC Midtjylland Håndbold	Trondheim Spektrum, Trondheim; Attendance: 1,600; Referees: Buy, Pichon (FRA)
1 October 2011; 16:15	Nøstvold 5	(8–11)	Brogger Led 6	Trondheim Spektrum, Trondheim; Attendance: 1,600; Referees: Buy, Pichon (FRA)
1 October 2011; 16:15	3× (yellow card) 1× (suspension)	Report	3× (yellow card) 4× (suspension)	Trondheim Spektrum, Trondheim; Attendance: 1,600; Referees: Buy, Pichon (FRA)

2 October 2011; 15:00	Thüringer HC (Germany)	23 – 27	(Montenegro) Budućnost Podgorica	Salza-Halle, Bad Langensalza; Attendance: 1,100; Referees: Cohen, Peretz (ISR)
2 October 2011; 15:00	Popluhárová 7	(9–13)	Bulatović, Popović 7	Salza-Halle, Bad Langensalza; Attendance: 1,100; Referees: Cohen, Peretz (ISR)
2 October 2011; 15:00	3× (yellow card) 4× (suspension)	Report	3× (yellow card) 4× (suspension)	Salza-Halle, Bad Langensalza; Attendance: 1,100; Referees: Cohen, Peretz (ISR)

8 October 2011; 14:30	FC Midtjylland Håndbold (Denmark)	23 – 20	(Germany) Thüringer HC	Ikast-Brande Arena, Ikast; Attendance: 2,200; Referees: Johansson, Kliko (SWE)
8 October 2011; 14:30	Jørgensen 7	(15–10)	Engel 11	Ikast-Brande Arena, Ikast; Attendance: 2,200; Referees: Johansson, Kliko (SWE)
8 October 2011; 14:30	3× (yellow card) 1× (suspension)	Report	3× (yellow card) 2× (suspension)	Ikast-Brande Arena, Ikast; Attendance: 2,200; Referees: Johansson, Kliko (SWE)

9 October 2011; 19:30	Budućnost Podgorica (Montenegro)	28 – 18	(Norway) Byåsen HE	Morača Sports Center, Podgorica; Attendance: 4,500; Referees: Herczeg, Südi (HUN)
9 October 2011; 19:30	Bulatović 6	(13–7)	Herrem, Nostvold 5	Morača Sports Center, Podgorica; Attendance: 4,500; Referees: Herczeg, Südi (HUN)
9 October 2011; 19:30	3× (yellow card) 7× (suspension) 1× (red card)	Report	3× (yellow card) 2× (suspension)	Morača Sports Center, Podgorica; Attendance: 4,500; Referees: Herczeg, Südi (HUN)

15 October 2011; 13:15	Byåsen HE (Norway)	23 – 22	(Germany) Thüringer HC	Trondheim Spektrum, Trondheim; Attendance: 1,200; Referees: Mazeika, Gatelis (LTU)
15 October 2011; 13:15	Alstad 8	(13–7)	Engel 12	Trondheim Spektrum, Trondheim; Attendance: 1,200; Referees: Mazeika, Gatelis (LTU)
15 October 2011; 13:15	2× (yellow card) 2× (suspension)	Report	3× (yellow card) 4× (suspension)	Trondheim Spektrum, Trondheim; Attendance: 1,200; Referees: Mazeika, Gatelis (LTU)

16 October 2011; 19:30	Budućnost Podgorica (Montenegro)	28 – 25	(Denmark) FC Midtjylland Håndbold	Morača Sports Center, Podgorica; Attendance: 4,400; Referees: Baranowski, Lemanowicz (POL)
16 October 2011; 19:30	Bulatović 9	(11–11)	Troelsen 9	Morača Sports Center, Podgorica; Attendance: 4,400; Referees: Baranowski, Lemanowicz (POL)
16 October 2011; 19:30	3× (yellow card) 3× (suspension) 1× (red card)	Report	2× (yellow card) 5× (suspension)	Morača Sports Center, Podgorica; Attendance: 4,400; Referees: Baranowski, Lemanowicz (POL)

29 October 2011; 16:15	Byåsen HE (Norway)	24 – 34	(Montenegro) Budućnost Podgorica	Trondheim Spektrum, Trondheim; Attendance: 1,800; Referees: Novikov, Perepilitsy (UKR)
29 October 2011; 16:15	Nøstvold 9	(11–16)	Popović 8	Trondheim Spektrum, Trondheim; Attendance: 1,800; Referees: Novikov, Perepilitsy (UKR)
29 October 2011; 16:15	2× (yellow card) 1× (suspension)	Report	3× (yellow card) 3× (suspension)	Trondheim Spektrum, Trondheim; Attendance: 1,800; Referees: Novikov, Perepilitsy (UKR)

30 October 2011; 15:00	Thüringer HC (Germany)	21 – 27	(Denmark) FC Midtjylland Håndbold	Salza-Halle, Bad Langensalza; Attendance: 1,400; Referees: Bounouara, Sami (FRA)
30 October 2011; 15:00	Snelder 6	(8–13)	Troelsen 5	Salza-Halle, Bad Langensalza; Attendance: 1,400; Referees: Bounouara, Sami (FRA)
30 October 2011; 15:00	3× (yellow card) 2× (suspension)	Report	3× (yellow card) 5× (suspension)	Salza-Halle, Bad Langensalza; Attendance: 1,400; Referees: Bounouara, Sami (FRA)

5 November 2011; 13:00	FC Midtjylland Håndbold (Denmark)	18 – 21	(Norway) Byåsen HE	Ikast-Brande Arena, Ikast; Attendance: 1,700; Referees: Jurinovic, Mrvica (CRO)
5 November 2011; 13:00	Troelsen 6	(5–13)	Andenaes 5	Ikast-Brande Arena, Ikast; Attendance: 1,700; Referees: Jurinovic, Mrvica (CRO)
5 November 2011; 13:00	3× (yellow card) 1× (suspension)	Report	2× (yellow card) 2× (suspension)	Ikast-Brande Arena, Ikast; Attendance: 1,700; Referees: Jurinovic, Mrvica (CRO)

6 November 2011; 19:30	Budućnost Podgorica (Montenegro)	35 – 25	(Germany) Thüringer HC	Morača Sports Center, Podgorica; Attendance: 3,400; Referees: Leandersson, Lindroos (FIN)
6 November 2011; 19:30	Bulatović 10	(20–10)	Engel 9	Morača Sports Center, Podgorica; Attendance: 3,400; Referees: Leandersson, Lindroos (FIN)
6 November 2011; 19:30	3× (yellow card) 6× (suspension) 1× (red card)	Report	3× (yellow card) 5× (suspension)	Morača Sports Center, Podgorica; Attendance: 3,400; Referees: Leandersson, Lindroos (FIN)

11 November 2011; 19:00	FC Midtjylland Håndbold (Denmark)	34 – 20	(Montenegro) Budućnost Podgorica	Ikast-Brande Arena, Ikast; Attendance: 2,400; Referees: Bonaventura, Bonaventura (FRA)
11 November 2011; 19:00	Kviesgaard 7	(19–10)	Stevin 5	Ikast-Brande Arena, Ikast; Attendance: 2,400; Referees: Bonaventura, Bonaventura (FRA)
11 November 2011; 19:00	2× (yellow card) 2× (suspension)	Report	3× (yellow card) 4× (suspension)	Ikast-Brande Arena, Ikast; Attendance: 2,400; Referees: Bonaventura, Bonaventura (FRA)

13 November 2011; 15:00	Thüringer HC (Germany)	28 – 28	(Norway) Byåsen HE	Salza-Halle, Bad Langensalza; Attendance: 1,000; Referees: Guseva, Vartanyan (RUS)
13 November 2011; 15:00	Nadgornaja 10	(12–15)	three players 5	Salza-Halle, Bad Langensalza; Attendance: 1,000; Referees: Guseva, Vartanyan (RUS)
13 November 2011; 15:00	2× (yellow card) 1× (suspension)	Report	2× (yellow card) 2× (suspension)	Salza-Halle, Bad Langensalza; Attendance: 1,000; Referees: Guseva, Vartanyan (RUS)

=== Group B ===
Team	Pld	W	D	L	GF	GA	GD	Pts	LHK	RKK	VHK	RKP
(Norway) Larvik HK	6	4	0	2	161	138	+23	8	—	31–19	19–20	37–25
(Slovenia) Krim Ljubljana	6	2	2	2	143	151	−8	6	19–22	—	31–25	22–22
(Denmark) Viborg HK	6	2	2	2	161	161	0	6	34–28	28–28	—	27–27
(Croatia) RK Podravka Koprivnica	6	1	2	3	146	161	−15	4	21–24	23–24	28–27	—

1 October 2011; 14:30	Viborg HK (Denmark)	34 – 28	(Norway) Larvik HK	Viborg Stadionhal, Viborg; Attendance: 2,400; Referees: Leifsson, Palsson (ISL)
1 October 2011; 14:30	Gulldén 12	(22–10)	Riegelhuth 8	Viborg Stadionhal, Viborg; Attendance: 2,400; Referees: Leifsson, Palsson (ISL)
1 October 2011; 14:30	3× (yellow card) 3× (suspension)	Report	3× (yellow card) 6× (suspension)	Viborg Stadionhal, Viborg; Attendance: 2,400; Referees: Leifsson, Palsson (ISL)

2 October 2011; 15:00	RK Podravka Koprivnica (Croatia)	23 – 24	(Slovenia) Krim Ljubljana	Fran Galović, Koprivnica; Attendance: 2,000; Referees: Mata, Lopez (ESP)
2 October 2011; 15:00	Tatari 7	(13–12)	Penezić 7	Fran Galović, Koprivnica; Attendance: 2,000; Referees: Mata, Lopez (ESP)
2 October 2011; 15:00	3× (yellow card) 4× (suspension)	Report	2× (yellow card) 6× (suspension)	Fran Galović, Koprivnica; Attendance: 2,000; Referees: Mata, Lopez (ESP)

7 October 2011; 18:00	Krim Ljubljana (Slovenia)	31 – 25	(Denmark) Viborg HK	Arena Stožice, Ljubljana; Attendance: 3,000; Referees: Stark, Stefan (ROU)
7 October 2011; 18:00	Penezić 8	(16–8)	Skov 7	Arena Stožice, Ljubljana; Attendance: 3,000; Referees: Stark, Stefan (ROU)
7 October 2011; 18:00	3× (yellow card) 2× (suspension)	Report	3× (yellow card) 2× (suspension)	Arena Stožice, Ljubljana; Attendance: 3,000; Referees: Stark, Stefan (ROU)

8 October 2011; 18:15	Larvik HK (Norway)	37 – 25	(Croatia) RK Podravka Koprivnica	Arena Larvik, Larvik; Attendance: 1,500; Referees: Andorka, Hucker (HUN)
8 October 2011; 18:15	Riegelhuth 9	(18–17)	Damnjanović 9	Arena Larvik, Larvik; Attendance: 1,500; Referees: Andorka, Hucker (HUN)
8 October 2011; 18:15	3× (yellow card) 1× (suspension)	Report	2× (yellow card)	Arena Larvik, Larvik; Attendance: 1,500; Referees: Andorka, Hucker (HUN)

15 October 2011; 14:30	Viborg HK (Denmark)	27 – 27	(Croatia) RK Podravka Koprivnica	Viborg Stadionhal, Viborg; Attendance: 1,200; Referees: Leandersson, Lindroos (FIN)
15 October 2011; 14:30	three players 5	(12–14)	Damnjanović 6	Viborg Stadionhal, Viborg; Attendance: 1,200; Referees: Leandersson, Lindroos (FIN)
15 October 2011; 14:30	2× (yellow card) 1× (suspension) 1× (red card)	Report	3× (yellow card) 3× (suspension) 2× (red card)	Viborg Stadionhal, Viborg; Attendance: 1,200; Referees: Leandersson, Lindroos (FIN)

16 October 2011; 14:15	Larvik HK (Norway)	31 – 19	(Slovenia) Krim Ljubljana	Arena Larvik, Larvik; Attendance: 1,800; Referees: Bonaventura, Bonaventura (FRA)
16 October 2011; 14:15	Sulland 8	(13–10)	Penezić 9	Arena Larvik, Larvik; Attendance: 1,800; Referees: Bonaventura, Bonaventura (FRA)
16 October 2011; 14:15	3× (yellow card) 1× (suspension)	Report	3× (yellow card) 4× (suspension)	Arena Larvik, Larvik; Attendance: 1,800; Referees: Bonaventura, Bonaventura (FRA)

29 October 2011; 18:00	RK Podravka Koprivnica (Croatia)	21 – 24	(Norway) Larvik HK	Fran Galović, Koprivnica; Attendance: 2,000; Referees: Tzaferopoulos, Bethmann (GRE)
29 October 2011; 18:00	Damnjanović 9	(11–11)	Kristiansen 6	Fran Galović, Koprivnica; Attendance: 2,000; Referees: Tzaferopoulos, Bethmann (GRE)
29 October 2011; 18:00	3× (yellow card) 2× (suspension)	Report	3× (yellow card) 4× (suspension)	Fran Galović, Koprivnica; Attendance: 2,000; Referees: Tzaferopoulos, Bethmann (GRE)

29 October 2011; 19:30	Viborg HK (Denmark)	28 – 28	(Slovenia) Krim Ljubljana	Viborg Stadionhal, Viborg; Attendance: 1,800; Referees: Stolarovs, Licis (LAT)
29 October 2011; 19:30	Fisker 8	(16–9)	Penezić 8	Viborg Stadionhal, Viborg; Attendance: 1,800; Referees: Stolarovs, Licis (LAT)
29 October 2011; 19:30	2× (yellow card) 3× (suspension)	Report	3× (yellow card) 7× (suspension) 1× (red card)	Viborg Stadionhal, Viborg; Attendance: 1,800; Referees: Stolarovs, Licis (LAT)

5 November 2011; 14:45	Larvik HK (Norway)	19 – 20	(Denmark) Viborg HK	Arena Larvik, Larvik; Attendance: 3,100; Referees: Lorente, Serradilla (ESP)
5 November 2011; 14:45	Breivang 4	(10–12)	Skov 5	Arena Larvik, Larvik; Attendance: 3,100; Referees: Lorente, Serradilla (ESP)
5 November 2011; 14:45	2× (yellow card) 4× (suspension)	Report	3× (yellow card) 4× (suspension)	Arena Larvik, Larvik; Attendance: 3,100; Referees: Lorente, Serradilla (ESP)

5 November 2011; 17:30	Krim Ljubljana (Slovenia)	22 – 22	(Croatia) RK Podravka Koprivnica	Arena Stožice, Ljubljana; Attendance: 4,500; Referees: Brehmer, Skowronek (POL)
5 November 2011; 17:30	Aćimović, Franić 6	(13–11)	Pušić 6	Arena Stožice, Ljubljana; Attendance: 4,500; Referees: Brehmer, Skowronek (POL)
5 November 2011; 17:30	2× (yellow card) 4× (suspension)	Report	3× (yellow card) 4× (suspension)	Arena Stožice, Ljubljana; Attendance: 4,500; Referees: Brehmer, Skowronek (POL)

13 November 2011; 18:00	RK Podravka Koprivnica (Croatia)	28 – 27	(Denmark) Viborg HK	Fran Galović, Koprivnica; Attendance: 2,000; Referees: Kavulic, Skruzny (SVK)
13 November 2011; 18:00	Damnjanović 10	(13–14)	Skov 8	Fran Galović, Koprivnica; Attendance: 2,000; Referees: Kavulic, Skruzny (SVK)
13 November 2011; 18:00	1× (yellow card) 3× (suspension)	Report	2× (yellow card) 4× (suspension)	Fran Galović, Koprivnica; Attendance: 2,000; Referees: Kavulic, Skruzny (SVK)

13 November 2011; 18:00	Krim Ljubljana (Slovenia)	19 – 22	(Norway) Larvik HK	Arena Stožice, Ljubljana; Attendance: 5,000; Referees: Horváth, Marton (HUN)
13 November 2011; 18:00	Penezić 6	(11–11)	Riegelhuth 7	Arena Stožice, Ljubljana; Attendance: 5,000; Referees: Horváth, Marton (HUN)
13 November 2011; 18:00	2× (yellow card) 6× (suspension)	Report	3× (yellow card) 5× (suspension)	Arena Stožice, Ljubljana; Attendance: 5,000; Referees: Horváth, Marton (HUN)

=== Group C ===
Team	Pld	W	D	L	GF	GA	GD	Pts	GKC	MHB	RHK	HYÖ
(Hungary) Győri Audi ETO KC	6	4	0	2	183	154	+29	8	—	28–23	35–20	37–29
(France) Metz Handball	6	3	0	3	154	156	−2	6	24–33	—	25–20	30–21
(Denmark) Randers HK	6	3	0	3	163	170	−7	6	29–23	26–27	—	39–32
(Austria) Hypo Niederösterreich	6	2	0	4	167	187	−20	4	29–27	28–25	28–29	—

1 October 2011; 18:30	Metz Handball (France)	30 – 21	(Austria) Hypo Niederösterreich	Arènes de Metz, Metz; Attendance: 3,600; Referees: Methe, Methe (GER)
1 October 2011; 18:30	Mendy 7	(16–10)	Rédei Soós, Rodrigues 5	Arènes de Metz, Metz; Attendance: 3,600; Referees: Methe, Methe (GER)
1 October 2011; 18:30	3× (yellow card) 5× (suspension)	Report	3× (yellow card) 4× (suspension) 1× (red card)	Arènes de Metz, Metz; Attendance: 3,600; Referees: Methe, Methe (GER)

2 October 2011; 15:00	Randers HK (Denmark)	29 – 23	(Hungary) Győri Audi ETO KC	Elro Arena Randers, Randers; Attendance: 1,200; Referees: Mazeika, Gatelis (LTU)
2 October 2011; 15:00	three players 5	(14–10)	Lekić 6	Elro Arena Randers, Randers; Attendance: 1,200; Referees: Mazeika, Gatelis (LTU)
2 October 2011; 15:00	3× (yellow card) 4× (suspension) 1× (red card)	Report	3× (yellow card) 3× (suspension)	Elro Arena Randers, Randers; Attendance: 1,200; Referees: Mazeika, Gatelis (LTU)

8 October 2011; 20:20	Hypo Niederösterreich (Austria)	28 – 29	(Denmark) Randers HK	Bundessport- und Freizeitzentrum Südstadt, Maria Enzersdorf; Attendance: 600; Referees: San Jose, Murcia (ESP)
8 October 2011; 20:20	Franca da Silva, Rédei Soós 7	(19–14)	Fruelund 9	Bundessport- und Freizeitzentrum Südstadt, Maria Enzersdorf; Attendance: 600; Referees: San Jose, Murcia (ESP)
8 October 2011; 20:20	3× (yellow card) 6× (suspension) 1× (red card)	Report	3× (yellow card) 4× (suspension)	Bundessport- und Freizeitzentrum Südstadt, Maria Enzersdorf; Attendance: 600; Referees: San Jose, Murcia (ESP)

9 October 2011; 15:00	Győri Audi ETO KC (Hungary)	28 – 23	(France) Metz Handball	Magvassy Mihály Sportcsarnok, Győr; Attendance: 2,000; Referees: Arntsen, Gullaksen (NOR)
9 October 2011; 15:00	Görbicz 10	Report	Pineau 7	Magvassy Mihály Sportcsarnok, Győr; Attendance: 2,000; Referees: Arntsen, Gullaksen (NOR)
9 October 2011; 15:00	2× (yellow card) 3× (suspension)		2× (yellow card) 1× (suspension)	Magvassy Mihály Sportcsarnok, Győr; Attendance: 2,000; Referees: Arntsen, Gullaksen (NOR)

16 October 2011; 16:50	Randers HK (Denmark)	26 – 27	(France) Metz Handball	Elro Arena Randers, Randers; Attendance: 2,000; Referees: Lah, Sok (SVN)
16 October 2011; 16:50	Müller 7	(14–14)	Ognjenović 9	Elro Arena Randers, Randers; Attendance: 2,000; Referees: Lah, Sok (SVN)
16 October 2011; 16:50	3× (yellow card) 1× (suspension)	Report	3× (yellow card) 2× (suspension)	Elro Arena Randers, Randers; Attendance: 2,000; Referees: Lah, Sok (SVN)

30 October 2011; 16:50	Randers HK (Denmark)	39 – 32	(Austria) Hypo Niederösterreich	Elro Arena Randers, Randers; Attendance: 2,350; Referees: Pandzic, Satordzija (BIH)
30 October 2011; 16:50	Cuadrado, Müller 6	(18–15)	do Nascimento 8	Elro Arena Randers, Randers; Attendance: 2,350; Referees: Pandzic, Satordzija (BIH)
30 October 2011; 16:50	2× (yellow card) 4× (suspension)	Report	2× (yellow card) 4× (suspension)	Elro Arena Randers, Randers; Attendance: 2,350; Referees: Pandzic, Satordzija (BIH)

30 October 2011; 17:00	Metz Handball (France)	24 – 33	(Hungary) Győri Audi ETO KC	Arènes de Metz, Metz; Attendance: 4,600; Referees: Brunovsky, Canda (SVK)
30 October 2011; 17:00	Pineau 5	(7–17)	Görbicz 8	Arènes de Metz, Metz; Attendance: 4,600; Referees: Brunovsky, Canda (SVK)
30 October 2011; 17:00	3× (yellow card) 3× (suspension)	Report	3× (yellow card) 4× (suspension)	Arènes de Metz, Metz; Attendance: 4,600; Referees: Brunovsky, Canda (SVK)

5 November 2011; 16:30	Győri Audi ETO KC (Hungary)	35 – 20	(Denmark) Randers HK	Magvassy Mihály Sportcsarnok, Győr; Attendance: 1,900; Referees: Opava, Valek (CZE)
5 November 2011; 16:30	Løke 8	(16–9)	Müller 6	Magvassy Mihály Sportcsarnok, Győr; Attendance: 1,900; Referees: Opava, Valek (CZE)
5 November 2011; 16:30	3× (yellow card) 2× (suspension)	Report	3× (yellow card) 4× (suspension)	Magvassy Mihály Sportcsarnok, Győr; Attendance: 1,900; Referees: Opava, Valek (CZE)

5 November 2011; 20:20	Hypo Niederösterreich (Austria)	28 – 25	(France) Metz Handball	Bundessport- und Freizeitzentrum Südstadt, Maria Enzersdorf; Attendance: 1,000; Referees: Maric, Masic (SRB)
5 November 2011; 20:20	do Nascimento 12	(15–13)	Pineau 5	Bundessport- und Freizeitzentrum Südstadt, Maria Enzersdorf; Attendance: 1,000; Referees: Maric, Masic (SRB)
5 November 2011; 20:20	3× (yellow card) 3× (suspension)	Report	2× (yellow card) 4× (suspension)	Bundessport- und Freizeitzentrum Südstadt, Maria Enzersdorf; Attendance: 1,000; Referees: Maric, Masic (SRB)

9 November 2011; 20:20	Hypo Niederösterreich (Austria)	29 – 27	(Hungary) Győri Audi ETO KC	Bundessport- und Freizeitzentrum Südstadt, Maria Enzersdorf; Attendance: 1,000; Referees: Pavičević, Raznatović (MNE)
9 November 2011; 20:20	do Nascimento 8	(15–13)	Radičević 7	Bundessport- und Freizeitzentrum Südstadt, Maria Enzersdorf; Attendance: 1,000; Referees: Pavičević, Raznatović (MNE)
9 November 2011; 20:20	2× (yellow card) 5× (suspension) 2× (red card)	Report	3× (yellow card) 3× (suspension)	Bundessport- und Freizeitzentrum Südstadt, Maria Enzersdorf; Attendance: 1,000; Referees: Pavičević, Raznatović (MNE)

12 November 2011; 18:30	Metz Handball (France)	25 – 20	(Denmark) Randers HK	Arènes de Metz, Metz; Attendance: 3,800; Referees: Gubica, Milosevic (CRO)
12 November 2011; 18:30	Ognjenovic, Pineau 7	(12–12)	Dalby 6	Arènes de Metz, Metz; Attendance: 3,800; Referees: Gubica, Milosevic (CRO)
12 November 2011; 18:30	3× (yellow card) 2× (suspension)	Report	3× (yellow card) 1× (suspension)	Arènes de Metz, Metz; Attendance: 3,800; Referees: Gubica, Milosevic (CRO)

13 November 2011; 17:15	Győri Audi ETO KC (Hungary)	37 – 29	(Austria) Hypo Niederösterreich	Magvassy Mihály Sportcsarnok, Győr; Attendance: 2,200; Referees: Johansson, Kliko (SWE)
13 November 2011; 17:15	Radičević 12	(17–12)	Rodrigues 10	Magvassy Mihály Sportcsarnok, Győr; Attendance: 2,200; Referees: Johansson, Kliko (SWE)
13 November 2011; 17:15	3× (yellow card) 5× (suspension)	Report	3× (yellow card) 4× (suspension)	Magvassy Mihály Sportcsarnok, Győr; Attendance: 2,200; Referees: Johansson, Kliko (SWE)

=== Group D ===
Team	Pld	W	D	L	GF	GA	GD	Pts	CSV	SDI	HCV	BSV
(Romania) CS Oltchim Rm. Vâlcea	6	5	0	1	168	146	+22	10	—	30–22	31–26	28–22
(Spain) Itxako Reyno de Navarra	6	4	0	2	163	158	+5	8	22–25	—	28–26	32–21
(Russia) Dinamo Volgograd	6	3	0	3	170	160	+10	6	34–30	25–27	—	29–23
(Germany) Buxtehuder SV	6	0	0	6	138	175	−37	0	20–24	31–32	21–30	—

30 September 2011; 19:00	Buxtehuder SV (Germany)	20 – 24	(Romania) CS Oltchim Rm. Vâlcea	Schulzentrum Nord, Buxtehude; Attendance: 1,200; Referees: Lythje, Christiansen (DEN)
30 September 2011; 19:00	Techert 4	(11–13)	Şoit 11	Schulzentrum Nord, Buxtehude; Attendance: 1,200; Referees: Lythje, Christiansen (DEN)
30 September 2011; 19:00	3× (yellow card) 4× (suspension)	Report	3× (yellow card) 5× (suspension)	Schulzentrum Nord, Buxtehude; Attendance: 1,200; Referees: Lythje, Christiansen (DEN)

1 October 2011; 14:00	Dinamo Volgograd (Russia)	25 – 27	(Spain) Itxako Reyno de Navarra	Dynamo, Volgograd; Attendance: 1,500; Referees: Pedersen, Mortensen (DEN)
1 October 2011; 14:00	Borshchenko 6	(11–14)	Martín 7	Dynamo, Volgograd; Attendance: 1,500; Referees: Pedersen, Mortensen (DEN)
1 October 2011; 14:00	3× (yellow card) 3× (suspension)	Report	3× (yellow card) 2× (suspension)	Dynamo, Volgograd; Attendance: 1,500; Referees: Pedersen, Mortensen (DEN)

8 October 2011; 19:00	Itxako Reyno de Navarra (Spain)	32 – 21	(Germany) Buxtehuder SV	Polideportivo Municipal Lizarrerria, Estella; Attendance: 1,250; Referees: Cvetko, Kavalar (SVN)
8 October 2011; 19:00	Barbosa 9	(15–10)	Melbeck, Techert 4	Polideportivo Municipal Lizarrerria, Estella; Attendance: 1,250; Referees: Cvetko, Kavalar (SVN)
8 October 2011; 19:00	3× (yellow card) 2× (suspension)	Report	3× (yellow card) 2× (suspension)	Polideportivo Municipal Lizarrerria, Estella; Attendance: 1,250; Referees: Cvetko, Kavalar (SVN)

9 October 2011; 18:00	CS Oltchim Rm. Vâlcea (Romania)	31 – 26	(Russia) Dinamo Volgograd	Sala Sporturilor Traian, Râmnicu Vâlcea; Attendance: 2,850; Referees: Gubica, Milosevic (CRO)
9 October 2011; 18:00	three players 5	(13–13)	Kochetova 9	Sala Sporturilor Traian, Râmnicu Vâlcea; Attendance: 2,850; Referees: Gubica, Milosevic (CRO)
9 October 2011; 18:00	3× (yellow card) 2× (suspension)	Report	2× (yellow card) 5× (suspension)	Sala Sporturilor Traian, Râmnicu Vâlcea; Attendance: 2,850; Referees: Gubica, Milosevic (CRO)

15 October 2011; 19:00	Itxako Reyno de Navarra (Spain)	22 – 25	(Romania) CS Oltchim Rm. Vâlcea	Polideportivo Municipal Lizarrerria, Estella; Attendance: 1,700; Referees: Pandzic, Mosorinski (SRB)
15 October 2011; 19:00	three players 5	(12–10)	Manea 5	Polideportivo Municipal Lizarrerria, Estella; Attendance: 1,700; Referees: Pandzic, Mosorinski (SRB)
15 October 2011; 19:00	3× (yellow card) 2× (suspension)	Report	3× (yellow card) 4× (suspension)	Polideportivo Municipal Lizarrerria, Estella; Attendance: 1,700; Referees: Pandzic, Mosorinski (SRB)

16 October 2011; 20:30	Buxtehuder SV (Germany)	21 – 30	(Russia) Dinamo Volgograd	Schulzentrum Nord, Buxtehude; Attendance: 1,500; Referees: Liachovicius, Gecevicius (LTU)
16 October 2011; 20:30	Langkeit 7	(11–15)	Khmyrova 6	Schulzentrum Nord, Buxtehude; Attendance: 1,500; Referees: Liachovicius, Gecevicius (LTU)
16 October 2011; 20:30	3× (yellow card) 4× (suspension)	Report	3× (yellow card) 5× (suspension)	Schulzentrum Nord, Buxtehude; Attendance: 1,500; Referees: Liachovicius, Gecevicius (LTU)

29 October 2011; 17:00	Buxtehuder SV (Germany)	31 – 32	(Spain) Itxako Reyno de Navarra	Schulzentrum Nord, Buxtehude; Attendance: 2,100; Referees: Leszczynski, Piechota (POL)
29 October 2011; 17:00	Melbeck 8	(14–14)	Barbosa 9	Schulzentrum Nord, Buxtehude; Attendance: 2,100; Referees: Leszczynski, Piechota (POL)
29 October 2011; 17:00	2× (yellow card) 5× (suspension)	Report	3× (yellow card) 5× (suspension)	Schulzentrum Nord, Buxtehude; Attendance: 2,100; Referees: Leszczynski, Piechota (POL)

30 October 2011; 14:00	Dinamo Volgograd (Russia)	34 – 30	(Romania) CS Oltchim Rm. Vâlcea	Dynamo, Volgograd; Attendance: 1,500; Referees: Johansson, Kliko (SWE)
30 October 2011; 14:00	Levina 8	(16–15)	Nechita-Olteanu 7	Dynamo, Volgograd; Attendance: 1,500; Referees: Johansson, Kliko (SWE)
30 October 2011; 14:00	3× (yellow card) 4× (suspension)	Report	3× (yellow card) 4× (suspension)	Dynamo, Volgograd; Attendance: 1,500; Referees: Johansson, Kliko (SWE)

5 November 2011; 19:00	Itxako Reyno de Navarra (Spain)	28 – 26	(Russia) Dinamo Volgograd	Polideportivo Municipal Lizarrerria, Estella; Attendance: 1,500; Referees: Hansen, Pettersen (NOR)
5 November 2011; 19:00	Martín 11	(15–14)	Borshchenko 6	Polideportivo Municipal Lizarrerria, Estella; Attendance: 1,500; Referees: Hansen, Pettersen (NOR)
5 November 2011; 19:00	3× (yellow card) 2× (suspension)	Report	4× (yellow card) 5× (suspension)	Polideportivo Municipal Lizarrerria, Estella; Attendance: 1,500; Referees: Hansen, Pettersen (NOR)

6 November 2011; 18:00	CS Oltchim Rm. Vâlcea (Romania)	28 – 22	(Germany) Buxtehuder SV	Sala Sporturilor Traian, Râmnicu Vâlcea; Attendance: 2,400; Referees: Cohen, Peretz (ISR)
6 November 2011; 18:00	Stanca 5	(12–9)	Stapelfeld 8	Sala Sporturilor Traian, Râmnicu Vâlcea; Attendance: 2,400; Referees: Cohen, Peretz (ISR)
6 November 2011; 18:00	3× (yellow card)	Report	3× (yellow card) 3× (suspension)	Sala Sporturilor Traian, Râmnicu Vâlcea; Attendance: 2,400; Referees: Cohen, Peretz (ISR)

13 November 2011; 14:00	Dinamo Volgograd (Russia)	29 – 23	(Germany) Buxtehuder SV	Dynamo, Volgograd; Attendance: 1,300; Referees: Arntsen, Gullaksen (NOR)
13 November 2011; 14:00	Levina 9	(13–11)	Bülau 5	Dynamo, Volgograd; Attendance: 1,300; Referees: Arntsen, Gullaksen (NOR)
13 November 2011; 14:00	2× (yellow card) 5× (suspension)	Report	2× (yellow card) 1× (suspension)	Dynamo, Volgograd; Attendance: 1,300; Referees: Arntsen, Gullaksen (NOR)

13 November 2011; 18:00	CS Oltchim Rm. Vâlcea (Romania)	30 – 22	(Spain) Itxako Reyno de Navarra	Sala Sporturilor Traian, Râmnicu Vâlcea; Attendance: 3,000; Referees: Mazeika, Gatelis (LTU)
13 November 2011; 18:00	Ardean-Elisei 10	(11–13)	Barbosa 7	Sala Sporturilor Traian, Râmnicu Vâlcea; Attendance: 3,000; Referees: Mazeika, Gatelis (LTU)
13 November 2011; 18:00	3× (yellow card) 1× (suspension)	Report	3× (yellow card) 4× (suspension)	Sala Sporturilor Traian, Râmnicu Vâlcea; Attendance: 3,000; Referees: Mazeika, Gatelis (LTU)

== Main round ==
The main round was held between 4 February – 11 March 2012.

The draw of the main round was held on 15 November 2011 at the Gartenhotel Altmannsdorf in Vienna. A total of eight teams advanced from the group stage to the main round and were located in two pots, with the group winners being in Pot 1 and the runners-up in Pot 2. Teams from the same groups at the group stage were not able to be drawn together.

=== Seedings ===
Pot 1	Pot 2
(Hungary) Győri Audi ETO KC (Montenegro) Budućnost Podgorica (Norway) Larvik HK (Romania) CS Oltchim Rm. Vâlcea	(Denmark) FC Midtjylland Håndbold (Spain) Itxako Reyno de Navarra (France) Metz Handball (Slovenia) Krim Ljubljana

=== Group 1 ===
Team	Pld	W	D	L	GF	GA	GD	Pts	GKC	LHK	SDI	FCM
(Hungary) Győri Audi ETO KC	6	4	1	1	173	156	+17	9	—	31–22	25–25	35–27
(Norway) Larvik HK	6	2	2	2	142	147	−5	6	32–25	—	23–23	20–27
(Spain) Itxako Reyno de Navarra	6	1	3	2	139	139	0	5	26–28	19–19	—	24–21
(Denmark) FC Midtjylland Håndbold	6	2	0	4	144	156	−12	4	24–29	22–26	23–22	—

3 February 2012; 18:30	FC Midtjylland Håndbold (Denmark)	22 – 26	(Norway) Larvik HK	Ikast-Brande Arena, Ikast; Attendance: 2,000; Referees: Pavicevic, Raznatovic (MNE)
3 February 2012; 18:30	Torstenson, Troelsen 5	(9–16)	Sulland 6	Ikast-Brande Arena, Ikast; Attendance: 2,000; Referees: Pavicevic, Raznatovic (MNE)
3 February 2012; 18:30	3× (yellow card) 1× (suspension)	Report	3× (yellow card) 4× (suspension)	Ikast-Brande Arena, Ikast; Attendance: 2,000; Referees: Pavicevic, Raznatovic (MNE)

4 February 2012; 19:00	Itxako Reyno de Navarra (Spain)	26 – 28	(Hungary) Győri Audi ETO KC	Polideportivo Municipal Lizarrerria, Estella; Attendance: 1,300; Referees: Stark, Stefan (ROU)
4 February 2012; 19:00	Alonso 8	(13–14)	Görbicz 10	Polideportivo Municipal Lizarrerria, Estella; Attendance: 1,300; Referees: Stark, Stefan (ROU)
4 February 2012; 19:00	3× (yellow card) 3× (suspension)	Report	3× (yellow card) 4× (suspension)	Polideportivo Municipal Lizarrerria, Estella; Attendance: 1,300; Referees: Stark, Stefan (ROU)

12 February 2012; 15:15	Győri Audi ETO KC (Hungary)	35 – 27	(Denmark) FC Midtjylland Håndbold	Magvassy Mihály Sportcsarnok, Győr; Attendance: 2,000; Referees: Cohen, Peretz (ISR)
12 February 2012; 15:15	Løke 11	(17–13)	Troelsen 8	Magvassy Mihály Sportcsarnok, Győr; Attendance: 2,000; Referees: Cohen, Peretz (ISR)
12 February 2012; 15:15	3× (yellow card) 2× (suspension)	Report	3× (yellow card) 7× (suspension)	Magvassy Mihály Sportcsarnok, Győr; Attendance: 2,000; Referees: Cohen, Peretz (ISR)

12 February 2012; 16:45	Larvik HK (Norway)	23 – 23	(Spain) Itxako Reyno de Navarra	Arena Larvik, Larvik; Attendance: 1,700; Referees: Zotin, Volodkov (RUS)
12 February 2012; 16:45	Blanco, Kristiansen 5	(10–10)	Martín 5	Arena Larvik, Larvik; Attendance: 1,700; Referees: Zotin, Volodkov (RUS)
12 February 2012; 16:45	3× (yellow card) 6× (suspension)	Report	3× (yellow card) 5× (suspension)	Arena Larvik, Larvik; Attendance: 1,700; Referees: Zotin, Volodkov (RUS)

18 February 2012; 14:30	FC Midtjylland Håndbold (Denmark)	23 – 22	(Spain) Itxako Reyno de Navarra	Ikast-Brande Arena, Ikast; Attendance: 1,600; Referees: Kavulic, Skruzny (SVK)
18 February 2012; 14:30	Jørgensen 5	(12–10)	Martín 7	Ikast-Brande Arena, Ikast; Attendance: 1,600; Referees: Kavulic, Skruzny (SVK)
18 February 2012; 14:30	3× (yellow card) 3× (suspension)	Report	3× (yellow card) 4× (suspension)	Ikast-Brande Arena, Ikast; Attendance: 1,600; Referees: Kavulic, Skruzny (SVK)

19 February 2012; 17:15	Győri Audi ETO KC (Hungary)	31 – 22	(Norway) Larvik HK	Magvassy Mihály Sportcsarnok, Győr; Attendance: 2,000; Referees: Mazeika, Gatelis (LTU)
19 February 2012; 17:15	Görbicz 12	(17–9)	Riegelhuth Koren 7	Magvassy Mihály Sportcsarnok, Győr; Attendance: 2,000; Referees: Mazeika, Gatelis (LTU)
19 February 2012; 17:15	2× (yellow card) 4× (suspension)	Report	2× (yellow card) 4× (suspension)	Magvassy Mihály Sportcsarnok, Győr; Attendance: 2,000; Referees: Mazeika, Gatelis (LTU)

24 February 2012; 18:30	FC Midtjylland Håndbold (Denmark)	24 – 29	(Hungary) Győri Audi ETO KC	Ikast-Brande Arena, Ikast; Attendance: 2,200; Referees: Sivak, Dvorsky (SVK)
24 February 2012; 18:30	Torstensson 5	(14–17)	Görbicz 9	Ikast-Brande Arena, Ikast; Attendance: 2,200; Referees: Sivak, Dvorsky (SVK)
24 February 2012; 18:30	2× (yellow card) 7× (suspension)	Report	3× (yellow card) 6× (suspension)	Ikast-Brande Arena, Ikast; Attendance: 2,200; Referees: Sivak, Dvorsky (SVK)

25 February 2012; 19:00	Itxako Reyno de Navarra (Spain)	19 – 19	(Norway) Larvik HK	Polideportivo Municipal Lizarrerria, Estella; Attendance: 1,600
25 February 2012; 19:00	Barbosa 6	(12–6)	Riegelhuth Koren 6	Polideportivo Municipal Lizarrerria, Estella; Attendance: 1,600
25 February 2012; 19:00	3× (yellow card) 3× (suspension)	Report	3× (yellow card) 3× (suspension)	Polideportivo Municipal Lizarrerria, Estella; Attendance: 1,600

4 March 2012; 16:45	Larvik HK (Norway)	20 – 27	(Denmark) FC Midtjylland Håndbold	Arena Larvik, Larvik; Attendance: 3,150; Referees: Leandersson, Lindroos (FIN)
4 March 2012; 16:45	three players 5	(12–11)	Woller 8	Arena Larvik, Larvik; Attendance: 3,150; Referees: Leandersson, Lindroos (FIN)
4 March 2012; 16:45	3× (yellow card) 4× (suspension)	Report	2× (yellow card) 3× (suspension) 1× (red card)	Arena Larvik, Larvik; Attendance: 3,150; Referees: Leandersson, Lindroos (FIN)

4 March 2012; 17:15	Győri Audi ETO KC (Hungary)	25 – 25	(Spain) Itxako Reyno de Navarra	Magvassy Mihály Sportcsarnok, Győr; Attendance: 2,000; Referees: Geipel, Helbig (GER)
4 March 2012; 17:15	Görbicz 8	(11–13)	Martín 8	Magvassy Mihály Sportcsarnok, Győr; Attendance: 2,000; Referees: Geipel, Helbig (GER)
4 March 2012; 17:15	3× (yellow card) 1× (suspension)	Report	3× (yellow card) 3× (suspension)	Magvassy Mihály Sportcsarnok, Győr; Attendance: 2,000; Referees: Geipel, Helbig (GER)

10 March 2012; 16:45	Larvik HK (Norway)	32 – 25	(Hungary) Győri Audi ETO KC	Arena Larvik, Larvik; Attendance: 3,150; Referees: Gubica, Milosevic (CRO)
10 March 2012; 16:45	Sulland 7	(13–11)	Görbicz 9	Arena Larvik, Larvik; Attendance: 3,150; Referees: Gubica, Milosevic (CRO)
10 March 2012; 16:45	3× (yellow card) 2× (suspension)	Report	2× (yellow card) 2× (suspension)	Arena Larvik, Larvik; Attendance: 3,150; Referees: Gubica, Milosevic (CRO)

10 March 2012; 19:15	Itxako Reyno de Navarra (Spain)	24 – 21	(Denmark) FC Midtjylland Håndbold	Polideportivo Municipal Lizarrerria, Estella; Attendance: 1,100; Referees: Pandzic, Satordzija (BIH)
10 March 2012; 19:15	Barbosa 10	(10–7)	Troelsen 8	Polideportivo Municipal Lizarrerria, Estella; Attendance: 1,100; Referees: Pandzic, Satordzija (BIH)
10 March 2012; 19:15	3× (yellow card) 7× (suspension)	Report	2× (yellow card) 6× (suspension)	Polideportivo Municipal Lizarrerria, Estella; Attendance: 1,100; Referees: Pandzic, Satordzija (BIH)

=== Group 2 ===
Team	Pld	W	D	L	GF	GA	GD	Pts	ZRK	CSV	RKK	MHB
(Montenegro) Budućnost Podgorica	6	6	0	0	182	149	+33	12	—	31–25	29–21	32–26
(Romania) CS Oltchim Rm. Vâlcea	6	3	1	2	166	163	+3	7	24–34	—	30–26	30–21
(Slovenia) Krim Ljubljana	6	2	0	4	147	161	−14	4	26–27	25–31	—	28–24
(France) Metz Handball	6	0	1	5	144	166	−22	1	27–29	26–26	20–21	—

4 February 2012; 18:00	Krim Ljubljana (Slovenia)	25 – 31	(Romania) CS Oltchim Rm. Vâlcea	Arena Stožice, Ljubljana; Attendance: 3,000; Referees: Leszczynski, Piechota (POL)
4 February 2012; 18:00	Aćimović 9	(13–16)	Özel 8	Arena Stožice, Ljubljana; Attendance: 3,000; Referees: Leszczynski, Piechota (POL)
4 February 2012; 18:00	3× (yellow card) 2× (suspension)	Report	3× (yellow card) 3× (suspension)	Arena Stožice, Ljubljana; Attendance: 3,000; Referees: Leszczynski, Piechota (POL)

4 February 2012; 19:00	Metz Handball (France)	27 – 29	(Montenegro) Budućnost Podgorica	Arènes de Metz, Metz; Attendance: 4,300; Referees: Gousko, Repkin (BLR)
4 February 2012; 19:00	Mendy 6	(14–15)	Popović 8	Arènes de Metz, Metz; Attendance: 4,300; Referees: Gousko, Repkin (BLR)
4 February 2012; 19:00	3× (yellow card) 3× (suspension)	Report	3× (yellow card) 6× (suspension)	Arènes de Metz, Metz; Attendance: 4,300; Referees: Gousko, Repkin (BLR)

12 February 2012; 18:00	CS Oltchim Rm. Vâlcea (Romania)	30 – 21	(France) Metz Handball	Sala Sporturilor Traian, Râmnicu Vâlcea; Attendance: 2,950; Referees: Lorente, Serradilla (ESP)
12 February 2012; 18:00	Ardean-Elisei, Managarova 5	(18–12)	Andryushina, Liščević 5	Sala Sporturilor Traian, Râmnicu Vâlcea; Attendance: 2,950; Referees: Lorente, Serradilla (ESP)
12 February 2012; 18:00	3× (yellow card) 2× (suspension)	Report	3× (yellow card) 4× (suspension)	Sala Sporturilor Traian, Râmnicu Vâlcea; Attendance: 2,950; Referees: Lorente, Serradilla (ESP)

12 February 2012; 19:00	Budućnost Podgorica (Montenegro)	29 – 21	(Slovenia) Krim Ljubljana	Morača Sports Center, Podgorica; Attendance: 1,250; Referees: Andorka, Hucker (HUN)
12 February 2012; 19:00	Miljanić 10	(13–14)	Penezić 9	Morača Sports Center, Podgorica; Attendance: 1,250; Referees: Andorka, Hucker (HUN)
12 February 2012; 19:00	3× (yellow card) 2× (suspension)	Report	2× (yellow card) 4× (suspension)	Morača Sports Center, Podgorica; Attendance: 1,250; Referees: Andorka, Hucker (HUN)

18 February 2012; 16:30	Metz Handball (France)	20 – 21	(Slovenia) Krim Ljubljana	Arènes de Metz, Metz; Attendance: 4,300; Referees: Johansson, Kliko (SWE)
18 February 2012; 16:30	Liscevič 6	(8–13)	Mavsar, Penezić 5	Arènes de Metz, Metz; Attendance: 4,300; Referees: Johansson, Kliko (SWE)
18 February 2012; 16:30	3× (yellow card) 4× (suspension)	Report	3× (yellow card) 5× (suspension)	Arènes de Metz, Metz; Attendance: 4,300; Referees: Johansson, Kliko (SWE)

19 February 2012; 18:00	CS Oltchim Rm. Vâlcea (Romania)	24 – 34	(Montenegro) Budućnost Podgorica	Sala Sporturilor Traian, Râmnicu Vâlcea; Attendance: 3,150; Referees: Pedersen, Mortensen (DEN)
19 February 2012; 18:00	three players 4	(13–18)	Popović 9	Sala Sporturilor Traian, Râmnicu Vâlcea; Attendance: 3,150; Referees: Pedersen, Mortensen (DEN)
19 February 2012; 18:00	3× (yellow card) 1× (suspension)	Report	3× (yellow card) 5× (suspension)	Sala Sporturilor Traian, Râmnicu Vâlcea; Attendance: 3,150; Referees: Pedersen, Mortensen (DEN)

24 February 2012; 18:30	Krim Ljubljana (Slovenia)	26 – 27	(Montenegro) Budućnost Podgorica	Arena Stožice, Ljubljana; Attendance: 2,000; Referees: Jurinovic, Mrvica (CRO)
24 February 2012; 18:30	Penezić 7	(9–14)	Popović 6	Arena Stožice, Ljubljana; Attendance: 2,000; Referees: Jurinovic, Mrvica (CRO)
24 February 2012; 18:30	2× (yellow card) 3× (suspension)	Report	3× (yellow card) 6× (suspension) 1× (red card)	Arena Stožice, Ljubljana; Attendance: 2,000; Referees: Jurinovic, Mrvica (CRO)

26 February 2012; 17:30	Metz Handball (France)	26 – 26	(Romania) CS Oltchim Rm. Vâlcea	Arènes de Metz, Metz; Attendance: 4,000; Referees: Togstad, Kristiansen (NOR)
26 February 2012; 17:30	Andryushina 6	(15–15)	Jovanović 6	Arènes de Metz, Metz; Attendance: 4,000; Referees: Togstad, Kristiansen (NOR)
26 February 2012; 17:30	3× (yellow card) 5× (suspension)	Report	3× (yellow card) 1× (suspension)	Arènes de Metz, Metz; Attendance: 4,000; Referees: Togstad, Kristiansen (NOR)

4 March 2012; 18:00	CS Oltchim Rm. Vâlcea (Romania)	30 – 26	(Slovenia) Krim Ljubljana	Sala Sporturilor Traian, Râmnicu Vâlcea; Attendance: 3,000; Referees: Maric, Masic (SRB)
4 March 2012; 18:00	Ardean-Elisei 8	(17–15)	Franić, Šerić 5	Sala Sporturilor Traian, Râmnicu Vâlcea; Attendance: 3,000; Referees: Maric, Masic (SRB)
4 March 2012; 18:00	3× (yellow card) 2× (suspension)	Report	3× (yellow card) 3× (suspension)	Sala Sporturilor Traian, Râmnicu Vâlcea; Attendance: 3,000; Referees: Maric, Masic (SRB)

4 March 2012; 19:00	Budućnost Podgorica (Montenegro)	32 – 26	(France) Metz Handball	Morača Sports Center, Podgorica; Attendance: 3,500; Referees: Lythje, Christiansen (DEN)
4 March 2012; 19:00	Popović 9	(15–9)	Liscevič 7	Morača Sports Center, Podgorica; Attendance: 3,500; Referees: Lythje, Christiansen (DEN)
4 March 2012; 19:00	3× (yellow card) 5× (suspension)	Report	2× (yellow card) 1× (suspension)	Morača Sports Center, Podgorica; Attendance: 3,500; Referees: Lythje, Christiansen (DEN)

10 March 2012; 20:00	Krim Ljubljana (Slovenia)	28 – 24	(France) Metz Handball	Arena Stožice, Ljubljana; Attendance: 2,150; Referees: Dobrovits, Tajok (HUN)
10 March 2012; 20:00	Penezić 8	(14–9)	Ognjenović 5	Arena Stožice, Ljubljana; Attendance: 2,150; Referees: Dobrovits, Tajok (HUN)
10 March 2012; 20:00	3× (yellow card) 1× (suspension)	Report	2× (yellow card) 1× (suspension)	Arena Stožice, Ljubljana; Attendance: 2,150; Referees: Dobrovits, Tajok (HUN)

11 March 2012; 19:00	Budućnost Podgorica (Montenegro)	31 – 25	(Romania) CS Oltchim Rm. Vâlcea	Morača Sports Center, Podgorica; Attendance: 4,000; Referees: Cacador, Nicolau (POR)
11 March 2012; 19:00	Bulatović 11	(17–15)	Managarova 6	Morača Sports Center, Podgorica; Attendance: 4,000; Referees: Cacador, Nicolau (POR)
11 March 2012; 19:00	3× (yellow card) 4× (suspension)	Report	3× (yellow card) 2× (suspension)	Morača Sports Center, Podgorica; Attendance: 4,000; Referees: Cacador, Nicolau (POR)
