= 2011–12 EHF Women's Champions League =

Tournament details
- Dates: 2 September 2011–13 May 2012
- Teams: 20 (qualification stage); 16 (group stage); 8 (Main round); 4 (knockout stage)

Final positions
- Champions: (Montenegro) Budućnost Podgorica (1st title)
- Runners-up: (Hungary) Győri Audi ETO KC

Tournament statistics
- Matches played: 76
- Goals scored: 3,968 (52.21 per match)
- Attendance: 182,790 (2,405 per match)
- Top scorer: (Hungary) Anita Görbicz (133 goals)

The 2011–12 EHF Women's Champions League was the nineteenth edition of the EHF Women's Champions League, the top continental handball event for club teams in Europe, organized and supervised by the European Handball Federation. Larvik HK entered the competition as title holders after beating SD Itxako in past season's final.

Budućnost Podgorica won the title for the first time by defeating Győri Audi ETO KC in the big final.

== Overview ==
=== Format change ===
Following the decision of the Executive Committee of the European Handball Federation in April 2011, the system of the EHF Women's Champions League qualifying tournaments have changed. Starting from this season, the second qualification tournaments will be played under a final four format, with the semifinals held on a Saturday while the final on the following day. The winners of each tournaments will qualify for the group stage. The method of the first qualification round did not change. In addition, unlike in previous years, clubs that are eliminated during the qualifying phase will directly go to the EHF Women's Cup Winners' Cup.

=== Team allocation ===
A total of 32 teams participated in the 2011–12 EHF Champions League from 23 federations. Places were distributed according to the EHF league coefficient, which took into account the performances in European competitions from 2007–08 to 2009–10. Norway have been awarded an additional entry as the title holder country.

Group matches
(Austria) Hypo Niederösterreich	(Croatia) Podravka Koprivnica	(Denmark) FC Midtjylland Håndbold	(France) Metz Handball
(Germany) Thüringer HC	(Hungary) Győri Audi ETO KC	(Montenegro) Budućnost Podgorica	(Norway) Larvik HK (TH)
(Romania) CS Oltchim Rm. Vâlcea	(Russia) HC Dinamo Volgograd	(Slovenia) Krim Ljubljana	(Spain) Itxako Reyno de Navarra
Qualification Tournament 2
(Denmark) Randers HK	(Denmark) Viborg HK (Note: Viborg HK were guaranteed wild card following the withdrawal of HC Sparta Kryvyi Rih.)	(Germany) Buxtehuder SV	(Hungary) DVSC-Fórum Debrecen
(North Macedonia) ŽRK Metalurg	(Norway) Tertnes HE	(Norway) Byåsen HE	(Poland) KGHM Metraco Zagłębie Lubin
(Romania) U Jolidon Cluj-Napoca	(Russia) Rostov-Don	(Spain) BM Elda Prestigio	(Sweden) IK Sävehof
Qualification Tournament 1
(Czech Republic) HC Veselí nad Moravou	(Greece) AC Ormi-Loux Patras	(Netherlands) MizuWaAi Dalfsen	(Portugal) CDE Gil Eanes
(Serbia) RK Zaječar	(Slovakia) HK IUVENTA Michalovce	(Switzerland) LC Brühl Handball	(Turkey) Üsküdar Bld. SK

=== Round and draw dates ===
All draws will be held at the EHF headquarters in Vienna, Austria.

Phase	Round	Draw date	First leg	Second leg
Qualifying	Qualification Tournament 1	27 June 2011	2–4 September 2011	
Qualifying	Qualification Tournament 2	27 June 2011	17–18 September 2011	
Group stage	Matchday 1	28 June 2011	1–2 October 2011	
Group stage	Matchday 2	28 June 2011	8–9 October 2011	
Group stage	Matchday 3	28 June 2011	15–16 October 2011	
Group stage	Matchday 4	28 June 2011	29–30 October 2011	
Group stage	Matchday 5	28 June 2011	5–6 November 2011	
Group stage	Matchday 6	28 June 2011	12–13 November 2011	
Main round	Matchday 1	15 November 2011	4–5 February 2012	
Main round	Matchday 2	15 November 2011	11–12 February 2012	
Main round	Matchday 3	15 November 2011	18–19 February 2012	
Main round	Matchday 4	15 November 2011	25–26 February 2012	
Main round	Matchday 5	15 November 2011	3–4 March 2012	
Main round	Matchday 6	15 November 2011	10–11 March 2012	
Knockout phase	Semifinals	—	31 March–1 April 2012	7–8 April 2012
Knockout phase	Finals	10 April 2012	5–6 May 2012	12–13 May 2012

== Qualifying rounds ==
The draw for both qualifying tournaments took place on 27 June 2011 in Vienna. The rights to organize and host the group matches were also decided in this draw.

=== Qualification Tournaments 1 ===
In the first stage of the qualifying process eight clubs were drawn into two groups of four. The sides played against each other once and the top two teams of each group advanced to the second qualifying phase, where they were classified automatically into the fourth pot. The four losing teams entered the 2011–12 EHF Cup Winners' Cup second round.

==== Seedings ====
Pot 1	Pot 2	Pot 3	Pot 4
(Greece) AC Ormi-Loux Patras (Turkey) Üsküdar Bld. SK	(Serbia) RK Zaječar (Netherlands) MizuWaAi Dalfsen	(Slovakia) HK IUVENTA Michalovce (Switzerland) LC Brühl Handball	(Portugal) CDE Gil Eanes (Czech Republic) HC Veselí nad Moravou

==== Group A ====
The tournament was organised by the Greek club AC Ormi-Loux Patras.

Team	Pld	W	D	L	GF	GA	GD	Pts
(Netherlands) MizuWaAi Dalfsen	3	3	0	0	103	74	+29	6
(Portugal) CDE Gil Eanes	3	1	0	2	87	88	−1	2
(Switzerland) LC Brühl Handball	3	1	0	2	83	97	−14	2
(Greece) AC Ormi-Loux Patras	3	1	0	2	76	90	−14	2

2 September 2011; 18:00	AC Ormi-Loux Patras (Greece)	27 – 26	(Switzerland) LC Brühl Handball	PEAK Olympionikis D.Tofalos hall, Proastio, Patras; Attendance: 100; Referees: Baranowski, Lemanowicz (POL)
2 September 2011; 18:00	Penev 10	(10–12)	Mustafoska 7	PEAK Olympionikis D.Tofalos hall, Proastio, Patras; Attendance: 100; Referees: Baranowski, Lemanowicz (POL)
2 September 2011; 18:00	3× (yellow card) 3× (suspension)	Report	3× (yellow card) 8× (suspension) 1× (red card)	PEAK Olympionikis D.Tofalos hall, Proastio, Patras; Attendance: 100; Referees: Baranowski, Lemanowicz (POL)

2 September 2011; 20:00	MizuWaAi Dalfsen (Netherlands)	31 – 25	(Portugal) CDE Gil Eanes	PEAK Olympionikis D.Tofalos hall, Proastio, Patras; Attendance: 100; Referees: Brkic, Jusufhodzic (AUT)
2 September 2011; 20:00	Malestein 7	(19–9)	Lopes 7	PEAK Olympionikis D.Tofalos hall, Proastio, Patras; Attendance: 100; Referees: Brkic, Jusufhodzic (AUT)
2 September 2011; 20:00	3× (yellow card) 2× (suspension)	Report	3× (yellow card) 4× (suspension)	PEAK Olympionikis D.Tofalos hall, Proastio, Patras; Attendance: 100; Referees: Brkic, Jusufhodzic (AUT)

3 September 2011; 18:00	LC Brühl Handball (Switzerland)	25 – 40	(Netherlands) MizuWaAi Dalfsen	PEAK Olympionikis D.Tofalos hall, Proastio, Patras; Attendance: 100; Referees: Brkic, Jusufhodzic (AUT)
3 September 2011; 18:00	Mustafoska 6	(11–19)	Van Dort 7	PEAK Olympionikis D.Tofalos hall, Proastio, Patras; Attendance: 100; Referees: Brkic, Jusufhodzic (AUT)
3 September 2011; 18:00	3× (yellow card) 7× (suspension)	Report	3× (yellow card) 3× (suspension)	PEAK Olympionikis D.Tofalos hall, Proastio, Patras; Attendance: 100; Referees: Brkic, Jusufhodzic (AUT)

3 September 2011; 20:00	CDE Gil Eanes (Portugal)	32 – 25	(Greece) AC Ormi-Loux Patras	PEAK Olympionikis D.Tofalos hall, Proastio, Patras; Attendance: 100; Referees: Baranowski, Lemanowicz (POL)
3 September 2011; 20:00	Seabra 9	(14–13)	Karagiorga, Niparaviciene 5	PEAK Olympionikis D.Tofalos hall, Proastio, Patras; Attendance: 100; Referees: Baranowski, Lemanowicz (POL)
3 September 2011; 20:00	2× (yellow card) 3× (suspension)	Report	3× (yellow card) 3× (suspension)	PEAK Olympionikis D.Tofalos hall, Proastio, Patras; Attendance: 100; Referees: Baranowski, Lemanowicz (POL)

4 September 2011; 18:00	LC Brühl Handball (Switzerland)	32 – 30	(Portugal) CDE Gil Eanes	PEAK Olympionikis D.Tofalos hall, Proastio, Patras; Attendance: 100; Referees: Baranowski, Lemanowicz (POL)
4 September 2011; 18:00	Bosshart 7	(16–13)	Pina 6	PEAK Olympionikis D.Tofalos hall, Proastio, Patras; Attendance: 100; Referees: Baranowski, Lemanowicz (POL)
4 September 2011; 18:00	3× (yellow card) 5× (suspension)	Report	3× (yellow card) 2× (suspension) 1× (red card)	PEAK Olympionikis D.Tofalos hall, Proastio, Patras; Attendance: 100; Referees: Baranowski, Lemanowicz (POL)

4 September 2011; 20:00	AC Ormi-Loux Patras (Greece)	24 – 32	(Netherlands) MizuWaAi Dalfsen	PEAK Olympionikis D.Tofalos hall, Proastio, Patras; Attendance: 100; Referees: Brkic, Jusufhodzic (AUT)
4 September 2011; 20:00	Strataki, Vafeiadou 6	(11–14)	Van Dort 7	PEAK Olympionikis D.Tofalos hall, Proastio, Patras; Attendance: 100; Referees: Brkic, Jusufhodzic (AUT)
4 September 2011; 20:00	3× (yellow card) 4× (suspension)	Report	2× (yellow card) 6× (suspension)	PEAK Olympionikis D.Tofalos hall, Proastio, Patras; Attendance: 100; Referees: Brkic, Jusufhodzic (AUT)

==== Group B ====
The tournament was organised by the Slovak side HK IUVENTA Michalovce.

Team	Pld	W	D	L	GF	GA	GD	Pts
(Serbia) RK Zaječar	3	3	0	0	101	70	+31	6
(Czech Republic) HC Veselí nad Moravou	3	2	0	1	77	78	−1	4
(Slovakia) HK IUVENTA Michalovce	3	1	0	2	85	94	−9	2
(Turkey) Üsküdar Bld. SK	3	0	0	3	81	102	−21	0

2 September 2011; 15:30	RK Zaječar (Serbia)	31 – 17	(Czech Republic) HC Veselí nad Moravou	Chemkostav Arena, Michalovce; Attendance: 400; Referees: Kaveshnikov, Plotnikov (RUS)
2 September 2011; 15:30	Erić 7	(14–9)	Flekova 4	Chemkostav Arena, Michalovce; Attendance: 400; Referees: Kaveshnikov, Plotnikov (RUS)
2 September 2011; 15:30	1× (yellow card) 5× (suspension)	Report	2× (yellow card) 4× (suspension)	Chemkostav Arena, Michalovce; Attendance: 400; Referees: Kaveshnikov, Plotnikov (RUS)

2 September 2011; 18:00	Üsküdar Bld. SK (Turkey)	28 – 38	(Slovakia) HK IUVENTA Michalovce	Chemkostav Arena, Michalovce; Attendance: 900; Referees: Stark, Stefan (ROU)
2 September 2011; 18:00	Yilmaz 8	(12–22)	Tobiasova 8	Chemkostav Arena, Michalovce; Attendance: 900; Referees: Stark, Stefan (ROU)
2 September 2011; 18:00	3× (yellow card) 5× (suspension)	Report	3× (yellow card) 7× (suspension)	Chemkostav Arena, Michalovce; Attendance: 900; Referees: Stark, Stefan (ROU)

3 September 2011; 15:30	HC Veselí nad Moravou (Czech Republic)	30 – 26	(Turkey) Üsküdar Bld. SK	Chemkostav Arena, Michalovce; Attendance: 250; Referees: Stark, Stefan (ROU)
3 September 2011; 15:30	Sukennikova 9	(13–13)	Sahin 7	Chemkostav Arena, Michalovce; Attendance: 250; Referees: Stark, Stefan (ROU)
3 September 2011; 15:30	3× (yellow card) 6× (suspension)	Report	3× (yellow card) 3× (suspension)	Chemkostav Arena, Michalovce; Attendance: 250; Referees: Stark, Stefan (ROU)

3 September 2011; 18:00	HK IUVENTA Michalovce (Slovakia)	26 – 36	(Serbia) RK Zaječar	Chemkostav Arena, Michalovce; Attendance: 1,200; Referees: Kaveshnikov, Plotnikov (RUS)
3 September 2011; 18:00	Pollakova 9	(13–17)	Pop Lazić 7	Chemkostav Arena, Michalovce; Attendance: 1,200; Referees: Kaveshnikov, Plotnikov (RUS)
3 September 2011; 18:00	2× (yellow card) 5× (suspension) 1× (red card)	Report	3× (yellow card) 5× (suspension)	Chemkostav Arena, Michalovce; Attendance: 1,200; Referees: Kaveshnikov, Plotnikov (RUS)

4 September 2011; 15:30	Üsküdar Bld. SK (Turkey)	27 – 34	(Serbia) RK Zaječar	Chemkostav Arena, Michalovce; Attendance: 500; Referees: Kaveshnikov, Plotnikov (RUS)
4 September 2011; 15:30	Ilkova 5	(12–15)	Erić 9	Chemkostav Arena, Michalovce; Attendance: 500; Referees: Kaveshnikov, Plotnikov (RUS)
4 September 2011; 15:30	3× (yellow card) 4× (suspension)	Report	2× (yellow card) 3× (suspension)	Chemkostav Arena, Michalovce; Attendance: 500; Referees: Kaveshnikov, Plotnikov (RUS)

4 September 2011; 18:00	HK IUVENTA Michalovce (Slovakia)	21 – 30	(Czech Republic) HC Veselí nad Moravou	Chemkostav Arena, Michalovce; Attendance: 1,300; Referees: Stark, Stefan (ROU)
4 September 2011; 18:00	Geric 5	(11–16)	Sukennikova 7	Chemkostav Arena, Michalovce; Attendance: 1,300; Referees: Stark, Stefan (ROU)
4 September 2011; 18:00	3× (yellow card) 3× (suspension)	Report	3× (yellow card) 6× (suspension)	Chemkostav Arena, Michalovce; Attendance: 1,300; Referees: Stark, Stefan (ROU)

=== Qualification Tournaments 2 ===
Sixteen clubs were set to participate in the second qualifying stage, divided into four groups of four. For the first time in the competition's history, a final four format was used to determine the group winners, that were qualified for the Group matches. According to the seeding list, teams in Pot 1 were drawn together with Pot 4 sides, while clubs from Pot 2 met Pot 3 teams in the semifinals of the tournaments. However, as stated in the EHF regulations, clubs from the same federation enjoyed protection and could not be selected into the same group. Teams that finished bottom of their respective groups went to the second round of the 2011–12 EHF Cup Winners' Cup, while second and third placed teams joined that competition in the third round.

==== Seedings ====
Pot 1	Pot 2	Pot 3	Pot 4
(Denmark) Randers HK (Hungary) DVSC-Fórum Debrecen (Norway) Byåsen HE (Romania) U Jolidon Cluj-Napoca	(Spain) BM Elda Prestigio (Russia) Rostov-Don (Germany) Buxtehuder SV (Norway) Tertnes HE	(Sweden) IK Sävehof (North Macedonia) ŽRK Metalurg (Poland) KGHM Metraco Zagłębie Lubin (Denmark) Viborg HK	(Netherlands) MizuWaAi Dalfsen (Serbia) RK Zaječar (Portugal) CDE Gil Eanes (Czech Republic) HC Veselí nad Moravou

==== Group 1 ====
The tournament was organised by the Danish club Viborg HK.

===== Bracket =====
Semi-finals
17 September 2011
(Romania) U Cluj-Napoca	33
(Serbia) RK Zaječar	32
17 September 2011
(Russia) Rostov-Don	17
(Denmark) Viborg HK	24

Final
18 September 2011
(Romania) U Cluj-Napoca	21
(Denmark) Viborg HK	37
Third place
18 September 2011
(Serbia) RK Zaječar	27
(Russia) Rostov-Don	15

===== Semifinals =====
17 September 2011; 14:30	Rostov-Don (Russia)	17 – 24	(Denmark) Viborg HK	Grenaa Idrætscenter, Grenaa; Attendance: 1,000; Referees: Bonaventura, Bonaventura (FRA)
17 September 2011; 14:30	three players 3	(11–10)	Fisker, Gulldén 6	Grenaa Idrætscenter, Grenaa; Attendance: 1,000; Referees: Bonaventura, Bonaventura (FRA)
17 September 2011; 14:30	3× (yellow card) 4× (suspension)	Report	2× (yellow card)	Grenaa Idrætscenter, Grenaa; Attendance: 1,000; Referees: Bonaventura, Bonaventura (FRA)

17 September 2011; 17:00	U Jolidon Cluj-Napoca (Romania)	33 – 32	(Serbia) RK Zaječar	Grenaa Idrætscenter, Grenaa; Attendance: 500; Referees: Lorente, Serradilla (ESP)
17 September 2011; 17:00	Dinca 8	(18–16)	Erić 8	Grenaa Idrætscenter, Grenaa; Attendance: 500; Referees: Lorente, Serradilla (ESP)
17 September 2011; 17:00	2× (yellow card) 3× (suspension)	Report	2× (yellow card) 6× (suspension)	Grenaa Idrætscenter, Grenaa; Attendance: 500; Referees: Lorente, Serradilla (ESP)

===== Third place match =====
18 September 2011; 14:30	RK Zaječar (Serbia)	27 – 15	(Russia) Rostov-Don	Grenaa Idrætscenter, Grenaa; Attendance: 500; Referees: Lorente, Serradilla (ESP)
18 September 2011; 14:30	Vučković 8	(14–7)	Sen 5	Grenaa Idrætscenter, Grenaa; Attendance: 500; Referees: Lorente, Serradilla (ESP)
18 September 2011; 14:30	3× (yellow card) 5× (suspension)	Report	3× (yellow card) 5× (suspension)	Grenaa Idrætscenter, Grenaa; Attendance: 500; Referees: Lorente, Serradilla (ESP)

===== Final =====
18 September 2011; 16:50	U Jolidon Cluj-Napoca (Romania)	21 – 37	(Denmark) Viborg HK	Grenaa Idrætscenter, Grenaa; Attendance: 1,100; Referees: Bonaventura, Bonaventura (FRA)
18 September 2011; 16:50	Ani Senocico 8	(14–17)	Fisker 8	Grenaa Idrætscenter, Grenaa; Attendance: 1,100; Referees: Bonaventura, Bonaventura (FRA)
18 September 2011; 16:50	3× (yellow card)	Report	2× (yellow card) 2× (suspension)	Grenaa Idrætscenter, Grenaa; Attendance: 1,100; Referees: Bonaventura, Bonaventura (FRA)

==== Group 2 ====
The tournament was organised by the Macedonian club ŽRK Metalurg.

===== Bracket =====
Semi-finals
17 September 2011
(Norway) Byåsen HE	27
(Czech Republic) HC Veselí nad Moravou	22
17 September 2011
(Spain) BM Elda Prestigio	22
(North Macedonia) ŽRK Metalurg	27

Final
18 September 2011
(Norway) Byåsen HE	20
(North Macedonia) ŽRK Metalurg	17
Third place
18 September 2011
(Czech Republic) HC Veselí nad Moravou	20
(Spain) BM Elda Prestigio	21

===== Semifinals =====
17 September 2011; 18:00	BM Elda Prestigio (Spain)	22 – 27	(North Macedonia) ŽRK Metalurg	Sportska Sala, Skopje; Attendance: 600; Referees: Bounouara, Sami (FRA)
17 September 2011; 18:00	Faria Servin 9	(9–14)	Bajramoska 7	Sportska Sala, Skopje; Attendance: 600; Referees: Bounouara, Sami (FRA)
17 September 2011; 18:00	3× (yellow card) 3× (suspension)	Report	3× (yellow card) 8× (suspension)	Sportska Sala, Skopje; Attendance: 600; Referees: Bounouara, Sami (FRA)

17 September 2011; 20:30	Byåsen HE (Norway)	27 – 22	(Czech Republic) HC Veselí nad Moravou	Sportska Sala, Skopje; Attendance: 300; Referees: Brehmer, Skowronek (POL)
17 September 2011; 20:30	Alstad 9	(13–14)	Sukennikova 6	Sportska Sala, Skopje; Attendance: 300; Referees: Brehmer, Skowronek (POL)
17 September 2011; 20:30	2× (yellow card) 2× (suspension)	Report	3× (yellow card) 7× (suspension)	Sportska Sala, Skopje; Attendance: 300; Referees: Brehmer, Skowronek (POL)

===== Third place match =====
18 September 2011; 17:30	HC Veselí nad Moravou (Czech Republic)	20 – 21	(Spain) BM Elda Prestigio	Sportska Sala, Skopje; Attendance: 100; Referees: Bounouara, Sami (FRA)
18 September 2011; 17:30	Rajnohova 5	(12–8)	Said Mohamed 6	Sportska Sala, Skopje; Attendance: 100; Referees: Bounouara, Sami (FRA)
18 September 2011; 17:30	3× (yellow card) 5× (suspension) 2× (red card)	Report	3× (yellow card) 3× (suspension)	Sportska Sala, Skopje; Attendance: 100; Referees: Bounouara, Sami (FRA)

===== Final =====
18 September 2011; 20:00	Byåsen HE (Norway)	20 – 17	(North Macedonia) ŽRK Metalurg	Sportska Sala, Skopje; Attendance: 500; Referees: Brehmer, Skowronek (POL)
18 September 2011; 20:00	Tomac 8	(12–8)	Gjorgjijevska 5	Sportska Sala, Skopje; Attendance: 500; Referees: Brehmer, Skowronek (POL)
18 September 2011; 20:00	3× (yellow card) 4× (suspension) 1× (red card)	Report	3× (yellow card) 5× (suspension)	Sportska Sala, Skopje; Attendance: 500; Referees: Brehmer, Skowronek (POL)

==== Group 3 ====
The tournament was organised by the Polish club Zagłębie Lubin.

===== Bracket =====
Semi-finals
17 September 2011
(Hungary) DVSC	35
(Portugal) CDE Gil Eanes	22
17 September 2011
(Germany) Buxtehuder SV	27
(Poland) Zagłębie Lubin	26

Final
18 September 2011
(Hungary) DVSC	26
(Germany) Buxtehuder SV	30
Third place
18 September 2011
(Portugal) CDE Gil Eanes	25
(Poland) Zagłębie Lubin	40

===== Semifinals =====
17 September 2011; 17:00	Buxtehuder SV (Germany)	27 – 26	(Poland) MKS Zagłębie Lubin	Hala Widowiskowo, Głogów; Attendance: 700; Referees: Crnojevic, Radic (CRO)
17 September 2011; 17:00	Lamein 9	(11–13)	Byzdra 8	Hala Widowiskowo, Głogów; Attendance: 700; Referees: Crnojevic, Radic (CRO)
17 September 2011; 17:00	2× (yellow card) 2× (suspension)	Report	2× (yellow card) 2× (suspension)	Hala Widowiskowo, Głogów; Attendance: 700; Referees: Crnojevic, Radic (CRO)

17 September 2011; 19:30	DVSC-Fórum Debrecen (Hungary)	35 – 22	(Portugal) CDE Gil Eanes	Hala Widowiskowo, Głogów; Attendance: 200; Referees: Guseva, Vartanyan (RUS)
17 September 2011; 19:30	Csáki 6	(16–9)	Piña, Seabra 5	Hala Widowiskowo, Głogów; Attendance: 200; Referees: Guseva, Vartanyan (RUS)
17 September 2011; 19:30	3× (yellow card) 1× (suspension)	Report	1× (yellow card)	Hala Widowiskowo, Głogów; Attendance: 200; Referees: Guseva, Vartanyan (RUS)

===== Third place match =====
18 September 2011; 12:30	CDE Gil Eanes (Portugal)	25 – 40	(Poland) MKS Zagłębie Lubin	Hala Widowiskowo, Głogów; Attendance: 200; Referees: Crnojevic, Radic (CRO)
18 September 2011; 12:30	three players 5	(7–26)	Migala 7	Hala Widowiskowo, Głogów; Attendance: 200; Referees: Crnojevic, Radic (CRO)
18 September 2011; 12:30	2× (yellow card)	Report	3× (yellow card) 1× (suspension)	Hala Widowiskowo, Głogów; Attendance: 200; Referees: Crnojevic, Radic (CRO)

===== Final =====
18 September 2011; 14:30	DVSC-Fórum Debrecen (Hungary)	26 – 30	(Germany) Buxtehuder SV	Hala Widowiskowo, Głogów; Attendance: 200; Referees: Guseva, Vartanyan (RUS)
18 September 2011; 14:30	Sopronyi 9	(13–16)	Klein 6	Hala Widowiskowo, Głogów; Attendance: 200; Referees: Guseva, Vartanyan (RUS)
18 September 2011; 14:30	3× (yellow card) 2× (suspension)	Report	2× (yellow card) 1× (suspension)	Hala Widowiskowo, Głogów; Attendance: 200; Referees: Guseva, Vartanyan (RUS)

==== Group 4 ====
The tournament was organised by the Swedish club IK Sävehof.

===== Bracket =====
Semi-finals
17 September 2011
(Denmark) Randers HK	34
(Netherlands) MizuWaAi Dalfsen	19
17 September 2011
(Norway) Tertnes HE	25
(Sweden) IK Sävehof	34

Final
18 September 2011
(Denmark) Randers HK	26
(Sweden) IK Sävehof	21
Third place
18 September 2011
(Netherlands) MizuWaAi Dalfsen	31
(Norway) Tertnes HE	32

===== Semifinals =====
17 September 2011; 14:00	Randers HK (Denmark)	34 – 19	(Netherlands) MizuWaAi Dalfsen	Partillebohallen, Partille; Attendance: 100; Referees: Leandersson, Lindroos (FIN)
17 September 2011; 14:00	Johansen 6	(18–9)	Schoenaker 4	Partillebohallen, Partille; Attendance: 100; Referees: Leandersson, Lindroos (FIN)
17 September 2011; 14:00	2× (yellow card) 4× (suspension)	Report	2× (yellow card) 5× (suspension)	Partillebohallen, Partille; Attendance: 100; Referees: Leandersson, Lindroos (FIN)

17 September 2011; 16:30	Tertnes HE (Norway)	25 – 34	(Sweden) IK Sävehof	Partillebohallen, Partille; Attendance: 500; Referees: Rakytina, Tkachuk (UKR)
17 September 2011; 16:30	Reinkind 7	(12–13)	Alm 10	Partillebohallen, Partille; Attendance: 500; Referees: Rakytina, Tkachuk (UKR)
17 September 2011; 16:30	3× (yellow card) 5× (suspension)	Report	3× (yellow card) 2× (suspension)	Partillebohallen, Partille; Attendance: 500; Referees: Rakytina, Tkachuk (UKR)

===== Third place match =====
18 September 2011; 12:00	MizuWaAi Dalfsen (Netherlands)	31 – 32	(Norway) Tertnes HE	Partillebohallen, Partille; Attendance: 50; Referees: Rakytina, Tkachuk (UKR)
18 September 2011; 12:00	Malestein 8	(19–18)	Gosse 10	Partillebohallen, Partille; Attendance: 50; Referees: Rakytina, Tkachuk (UKR)
18 September 2011; 12:00	3× (yellow card) 7× (suspension) 1× (red card)	Report	3× (yellow card) 4× (suspension)	Partillebohallen, Partille; Attendance: 50; Referees: Rakytina, Tkachuk (UKR)

===== Final =====
18 September 2011; 14:30	Randers HK (Denmark)	26 – 21	(Sweden) IK Sävehof	Partillebohallen, Partille; Attendance: 500; Referees: Leandersson, Lindroos (FIN)
18 September 2011; 14:30	Dalby 7	(13–10)	Alm 7	Partillebohallen, Partille; Attendance: 500; Referees: Leandersson, Lindroos (FIN)
18 September 2011; 14:30	3× (yellow card) 3× (suspension)	Report	3× (yellow card) 2× (suspension)	Partillebohallen, Partille; Attendance: 500; Referees: Leandersson, Lindroos (FIN)

== Group matches ==
The draw of the group matches was held on June 28 at the Gartenhotel Altmannsdorf in Vienna. A total of sixteen teams were concerned in the process, having divided into four pots of four. Similar to the qualifying phase, clubs from the same country could not be drawn into the same group, therefore, instead of direct draw, Pot 4 teams were allocated to the first possible position from Group A to Group D.

=== Seedings ===
Pot 1	Pot 2	Pot 3	Pot 4
(Norway) Larvik HK (Denmark) FC Midtjylland Håndbold (Hungary) Győri Audi ETO KC (Romania) CS Oltchim Rm. Vâlcea	(Montenegro) Budućnost Podgorica (Austria) Hypo Niederösterreich (Slovenia) Krim Ljubljana (Spain) Itxako Reyno de Navarra	(Russia) HC Dinamo Volgograd (Germany) Thüringer HC (France) Metz Handball (Croatia) Podravka Koprivnica	(Denmark) Viborg HK (Norway) Byåsen HE (Germany) Buxtehuder SV (Denmark) Randers HK

=== Group A ===
Team	Pld	W	D	L	GF	GA	GD	Pts	ZRK	FCM	BIL	THC
(Montenegro) Budućnost Podgorica	6	5	0	1	172	149	+23	10	—	28–25	28–18	35–25
(Denmark) FC Midtjylland Håndbold	6	4	0	2	146	127	+19	8	34–20	—	18–21	23–20
(Norway) Byåsen HE	6	2	1	3	131	149	−18	5	24–34	17–19	—	23–22
(Germany) Thüringer HC	6	0	1	5	139	163	−24	1	23–27	21–27	28–28	—

=== Group B ===
Team	Pld	W	D	L	GF	GA	GD	Pts	LHK	RKK	VHK	RKP
(Norway) Larvik HK	6	4	0	2	161	138	+23	8	—	31–19	19–20	37–25
(Slovenia) Krim Ljubljana	6	2	2	2	143	151	−8	6	19–22	—	31–25	22–22
(Denmark) Viborg HK	6	2	2	2	161	161	0	6	34–28	28–28	—	27–27
(Croatia) RK Podravka Koprivnica	6	1	2	3	146	161	−15	4	21–24	23–24	28–27	—

=== Group C ===
Team	Pld	W	D	L	GF	GA	GD	Pts	GKC	MHB	RHK	HYÖ
(Hungary) Győri Audi ETO KC	6	4	0	2	183	154	+29	8	—	28–23	35–20	37–29
(France) Metz Handball	6	3	0	3	154	156	−2	6	24–33	—	25–20	30–21
(Denmark) Randers HK	6	3	0	3	163	170	−7	6	29–23	26–27	—	39–32
(Austria) Hypo Niederösterreich	6	2	0	4	167	187	−20	4	29–27	28–25	28–29	—

=== Group D ===
Team	Pld	W	D	L	GF	GA	GD	Pts	CSV	SDI	HCV	BSV
(Romania) CS Oltchim Rm. Vâlcea	6	5	0	1	168	146	+22	10	—	30–22	31–26	28–22
(Spain) Itxako Reyno de Navarra	6	4	0	2	163	158	+5	8	22–25	—	28–26	32–21
(Russia) Dinamo Volgograd	6	3	0	3	170	160	+10	6	34–30	25–27	—	29–23
(Germany) Buxtehuder SV	6	0	0	6	138	175	−37	0	20–24	31–32	21–30	—

== Main round ==
The draw of the main round was held on November 15 at the Gartenhotel Altmannsdorf in Vienna. A total of eight teams advanced from the group stage to the main round and were located in two pots, with the group winners being in Pot 1 and the runners-up in Pot 2. Teams from the same groups at the group stage were not able to be drawn together.

=== Seedings ===
Pot 1	Pot 2
(Hungary) Győri Audi ETO KC (Montenegro) Budućnost Podgorica (Norway) Larvik HK (Romania) CS Oltchim Rm. Vâlcea	(Denmark) FC Midtjylland Håndbold (Spain) Itxako Reyno de Navarra (France) Metz Handball (Slovenia) Krim Ljubljana

=== Group 1 ===
Team	Pld	W	D	L	GF	GA	GD	Pts	GKC	LHK	SDI	FCM
(Hungary) Győri Audi ETO KC	6	4	1	1	173	156	+17	9	—	31–22	25–25	35–27
(Norway) Larvik HK	6	2	2	2	142	147	−5	6	32–25	—	23–23	20–27
(Spain) Itxako Reyno de Navarra	6	1	3	2	139	139	0	5	26–28	19–19	—	24–21
(Denmark) FC Midtjylland Håndbold	6	2	0	4	144	156	−12	4	24–29	22–26	23–22	—

=== Group 2 ===
Team	Pld	W	D	L	GF	GA	GD	Pts	ZRK	CSV	RKK	MHB
(Montenegro) Budućnost Podgorica	6	6	0	0	182	149	+33	12	—	31–25	29–21	32–26
(Romania) CS Oltchim Rm. Vâlcea	6	3	1	2	166	163	+3	7	24–34	—	30–26	30–21
(Slovenia) Krim Ljubljana	6	2	0	4	147	161	−14	4	26–27	25–31	—	28–24
(France) Metz Handball	6	0	1	5	144	166	−22	1	27–29	26–26	20–21	—

== Knockout stage ==
=== Semifinals ===
Team 1	Agg.	Team 2	1st leg	2nd leg
CS Oltchim Rm. Vâlcea (Romania)	58–62	(Hungary) Győri Audi ETO KC	35–31	23–31
Larvik HK (Norway)	33–45	(Montenegro) Budućnost Podgorica	20–22	13–23

=== Final ===
Team 1	Agg.	Team 2	1st leg	2nd leg
Győri Audi ETO KC (Hungary)	54–54	(Montenegro) Budućnost Podgorica	29–27	25–27

== Top scorers ==
Final statistics

Rank	Name	Team	Goals
1	(Hungary) Anita Görbicz	(Hungary) Győri Audi ETO KC	133
2	(Montenegro) Bojana Popović	(Montenegro) Budućnost Podgorica	106
3	(Montenegro) Katarina Bulatović	(Montenegro) Budućnost Podgorica	97
4	(Portugal) Alexandrina Cabral	(Spain) Itxako Reyno de Navarra	78
4	(Croatia) Andrea Penezić	(Slovenia) Krim Ljubljana	78
6	(Brazil) Eduarda Amorim	(Hungary) Győri Audi ETO KC	75
7	(Norway) Heidi Løke	(Hungary) Győri Audi ETO KC	72
8	(Norway) Linn-Kristin Riegelhuth Koren	(Norway) Larvik HK	69
9	(Montenegro) Jovanka Radičević	(Hungary) Győri Audi ETO KC	62
9	(Norway) Linn Jørum Sulland	(Norway) Larvik HK	62
