= 2011–12 EHF Women's Champions League knockout stage =

The 2011–12 EHF Women's Champions League knockout stage ran from 31 March to 13 May 2012. The top two placed teams from the main round advanced to the semifinals.

== Semifinals ==
Team 1	Agg.	Team 2	1st leg	2nd leg
CS Oltchim Rm. Vâlcea (Romania)	58–62	(Hungary) Győri Audi ETO KC	35–31	23–31
Larvik HK (Norway)	33–45	(Montenegro) Budućnost Podgorica	20–22	13–23

=== First leg ===
31 March 2012; 16:45	Larvik HK (Norway)	20 – 22	(Montenegro) Budućnost Podgorica	Arena Larvik, Larvik; Attendance: 2,800; Referees: Badura, Ondogrecula (SVK)
31 March 2012; 16:45	Koren Riegelhuth 8	(12–12)	Bulatović, Popović 6	Arena Larvik, Larvik; Attendance: 2,800; Referees: Badura, Ondogrecula (SVK)
31 March 2012; 16:45	3× (yellow card) 2× (suspension)	Report	3× (yellow card) 6× (suspension)	Arena Larvik, Larvik; Attendance: 2,800; Referees: Badura, Ondogrecula (SVK)

1 April 2012; 18:00	CS Oltchim Rm. Vâlcea (Romania)	35 – 31	(Hungary) Győri Audi ETO KC	Sala Sporturilor Traian, Râmnicu Vâlcea; Attendance: 3,140; Referees: Stolarovs, Licis (LAT)
1 April 2012; 18:00	Pușcașu 7	(13–17)	Amorim 10	Sala Sporturilor Traian, Râmnicu Vâlcea; Attendance: 3,140; Referees: Stolarovs, Licis (LAT)
1 April 2012; 18:00	3× (yellow card) 4× (suspension)	Report	3× (yellow card) 2× (suspension)	Sala Sporturilor Traian, Râmnicu Vâlcea; Attendance: 3,140; Referees: Stolarovs, Licis (LAT)

=== Second leg ===
7 April 2012; 16:00	Győri Audi ETO KC (Hungary)	31 – 23	(Romania) CS Oltchim Rm. Vâlcea	Veszprém Aréna, Veszprém^{1} Attendance: 5,000; Referees: Dentz, Reibel (FRA)
7 April 2012; 16:00	Görbicz 12	(19–12)	five players 3	Veszprém Aréna, Veszprém^{1} Attendance: 5,000; Referees: Dentz, Reibel (FRA)
7 April 2012; 16:00	3× (yellow card) 6× (suspension)	Report	3× (yellow card) 6× (suspension)	Veszprém Aréna, Veszprém^{1} Attendance: 5,000; Referees: Dentz, Reibel (FRA)

8 April 2012; 19:00	Budućnost Podgorica (Montenegro)	23 – 13	(Norway) Larvik HK	Morača Sports Center, Podgorica; Attendance: 4,500; Referees: Opava, Valek (CZE)
8 April 2012; 19:00	Popović 7	(10–7)	Sulland 3	Morača Sports Center, Podgorica; Attendance: 4,500; Referees: Opava, Valek (CZE)
8 April 2012; 19:00	3× (yellow card) 2× (suspension)	Report	3× (yellow card) 1× (suspension)	Morača Sports Center, Podgorica; Attendance: 4,500; Referees: Opava, Valek (CZE)

Notes

- Note 1: Győri Audi ETO KC played their home match on Veszprém Aréna in Veszprém as it has a greater capacity than their own Magvassy Mihály Sportcsarnok from Győr.

== Final ==
Team 1	Agg.	Team 2	1st leg	2nd leg
Győri Audi ETO KC (Hungary)	54–54	(Montenegro) Budućnost Podgorica	29–27	25–27

=== First leg ===
5 May 2012; 17:15	Győri Audi ETO KC (Hungary)	29 – 27	(Montenegro) Budućnost Podgorica	Veszprém Aréna, Veszprém^{1} Attendance: 5,000; Referees: Fleisch, Rieber (GER)
5 May 2012; 17:15	Görbicz 12	(13–12)	Popović 14	Veszprém Aréna, Veszprém^{1} Attendance: 5,000; Referees: Fleisch, Rieber (GER)
5 May 2012; 17:15	3× (yellow card) 2× (suspension)	Report	3× (yellow card) 5× (suspension) 1× (red card)	Veszprém Aréna, Veszprém^{1} Attendance: 5,000; Referees: Fleisch, Rieber (GER)

=== Second leg ===
13 May 2012; 19:00	Budućnost Podgorica (Montenegro)	27 – 25	(Hungary) Győri Audi ETO KC	Morača Sports Center, Podgorica; Attendance: 4,000; Referees: Gjeding, Hansen (DEN)
13 May 2012; 19:00	Bulatović 9	(13–12)	Görbicz 9	Morača Sports Center, Podgorica; Attendance: 4,000; Referees: Gjeding, Hansen (DEN)
13 May 2012; 19:00	3× (yellow card) 9× (suspension)	Report	3× (yellow card) 3× (suspension)	Morača Sports Center, Podgorica; Attendance: 4,000; Referees: Gjeding, Hansen (DEN)

Notes

- Note 1: Győri Audi ETO KC played their home match on Veszprém Aréna in Veszprém as it has a greater capacity than their own Magvassy Mihály Sportcsarnok from Győr.
