= Stéphanie Cano =

French handball player (born 1974)

Personal information
- Born: 17 April 1974 (age 52) Bordeaux, France
- Height: 1.64 m (5 ft 5 in)

Sport
- Sport: Handball
- Position: Right Wing

Youth career
- Years: Team
- 1989–1991: Léognan Handball

Senior clubs
- Years: Team
- 1991–2002: Mérignac Handball
- 2002–2003: Mar El Osito L'Eliana
- 2003–2004: Slagelse DT
- 2004–2005: BM Elda Prestigio
- 2005–2010: CA Bèglais
National team
Years	Team	Apps	(Gls)
1993–2008	France	231	(462)
Medal record
Women's handball
Representing France
World Championship
Gold medal – first place	2003 Croatia	Team
Silver medal – second place	1999 Denmark/Norway	Team
European Championship
Bronze medal – third place	2002 Denmark	Team
Bronze medal – third place	2006 Sweden	Team
Mediterranean Games
Gold medal – first place	2001 Tunis	Team

Stéphanie Cano (born 17 April 1974) is a French handball player who has played for the French national team, and is a world champion from 2003.

She was included in the European Handball Federation Hall of Fame in 2023.

== Club career ==
Cano played for Léognan Handball's youth team from 1989 to 1991. She then joined Mérignac Handball, where she played for over 10 years.

She then joined Spanish team Mar El Osito L'Eliana in 2002. In her only season at the club, she reached the final of the 2002-03 EHF Women's Champions League, where they lost to Slovenian Krim Ljubljana.

She then joined Slagelse FH in Denmark. With the club she won the 2003-04 EHF Women's Champions League.

After a year in Denmark, she returned to Spain and joined BM Elda Prestigio. In 2005 she returned to France, where she joined CA Bèglais. Here she played until 2010, where she retired.

== National team ==
Cano made her debut for the French national team on 7 September 1993 against Sweden.

At the 2003 World Women's Handball Championship she won a gold medal, which was the first ever for France. She also won a silver medal at the 1999 World Women's Handball Championship, losing to Norway in the final. She also won a bronze medal at both the 2002 and 2006 European Women's Handball Championship. In 2002 she was included in the tournament all-star team.

She also participated at the 2000 Summer Olympics in Sydney, at the 2004 Summer Olympics in Athens, and at the 2008 Summer Olympics in China, where the French team placed fifth.
