= Migala (surname) =

Migala, Migaľa, or Migała is a surname. Notable people with the surname include:

- Lukáš Migaľa (born 1990), Slovak footballer
- Monika Migała (born 1987), Polish handball player
