= 2004–05 EHF Women's Champions League =

The 2004–2005 EHF Women's Champions League was the 12th edition of the modern era of the EHF's premier competition for women's handball clubs, and the 45th overall. Slagelse FH won the tournament for a second time in a row.

== Results ==
=== First qualification ===
Date		Home team in the 1. Match	Home team in the 2. Match	Result		
1. Match	2. Match	Home team in the 1. Match	Home team in the 2. Match	1. Match	2. Match	Agg.
11.9.	12.9.	(Romania) CS Silcotub Zalau	(Lithuania) Egle Vilnius	34-21	31-22	65–43
11.9.	18.9.	(Slovakia) Slovan Duslo Sala	(Croatia) RK Lokomotiva Zagreb	23-18	21-25	44–43
11.9.	18.9.	(Greece) GAS Anagennisi Artas	(Portugal) Madeira Andebol SAD	32-30	27-29	59–59
11.9.	12.9.	(Ukraine) HC Motor Zaporizhzhia	(Switzerland) ZMC Amicitia Zürich	25-19	27-18	52–37
11.9.	18.9.	(Netherlands) Zeeman Vastgoed SEW	(Germany) Frankfurter HC	20-40	22-29	42–69
11.9.	18.9.	(Italy) Pelpast Salerno	(France) Handball Metz Metropole	15-32	11-31	26–63

=== Second qualification round ===
Date		Home team in the 1. Match	Home team in the 2. Match	Result		
1. Match	2. Match	Home team in the 1. Match	Home team in the 2. Match	1. Match	2. Match	Agg.
9.10.	16.10.	(Russia) Volgograd AKVA	(Germany) Frankfurter HC	30-27	31-22	61–49
10.10.	16.10.	(Norway) Tertnes IL	(Slovakia) Slovan Duslo Sala	32-20	23-28	55–48
9.10.	17.10.	(Ukraine) HC Motor Zaporizhzhia	(Hungary) Győri ETO KC	31-28	27-29	58–57
8.10.	10.10.	(Romania) CS Silcotub Zalau	(Spain) CBM Astroc Sagunto	21-28	25-28	46–56
9.10.	16.10.	(France) Handball Metz Metropole	(Serbia and Montenegro) RK DIN Nis	24-20	20-28	44–48
10.10.	15.10.	(Poland) Nata AZS-AWFiS Gdansk	(Austria) Hypo Niederösterreich	28-38	29-33	57–71
9.10.	17.10.	(Denmark) Ikast-Bording EH	(Portugal) Madeira Andebol SAD	38-18	29-20	67–37

=== Group stage ===
==== Group A ====
Date	Match	Res.
8.1.	CBM Astroc Sagunto – ZRK Buducnost MONET	33-28
9.1.	Ikast-Bording EH – Dunaferr SE	28-27
15.1.	Dunaferr SE – CBM Astroc Sagunto	35-28
16.1.	ZRK Buducnost MONET – Ikast-Bording EH	22-27
23.1.	Ikast-Bording EH – CBM Astroc Sagunto	32-27
29.1.	CBM Astroc Sagunto – Dunaferr SE	26-33
30.1.	Ikast-Bording EH – ZRK Buducnost MONET	32-25
6.2.	ZRK Buducnost MONET – Dunaferr SE	16-18
12.2.	Dunaferr SE – Ikast-Bording EH	25-25
13.2.	ZRK Buducnost MONET – CBM Astroc Sagunto	32-28
19.2.	CBM Astroc Sagunto – Ikast-Bording EH	37-30
19.2.	Dunaferr SE – ZRK Buducnost MONET	27-18

Team	Matches	Goals	Point
(Denmark) Ikast-Bording EH	6	174-163	9
(Hungary) Dunaferr SE	6	165-141	9
(Spain) CBM Astroc Sagunto	6	179-190	4
(Serbia and Montenegro) ZRK Buducnost MONET	6	141-165	2

==== Group B ====
Date	Kamp	Res.
7.1.	Hypo Niederösterreich – Viborg HK	29-28
8.1.	Volgograd AKVA – Nordstrand 2000	28-22
15.1.	Viborg HK – Volgograd AKVA	38-29
15.1.	Nordstrand 2000 – Hypo Niederösterreich	22-31
21.1.	Hypo Niederösterreich – Volgograd AKVA	31-25
22.1.	Nordstrand 2000 – Viborg HK	14-29
28.1.	Hypo Niederösterreich – Nordstrand 2000	37-25
30.1.	Volgograd AKVA – Viborg HK	29-27
12.2.	Viborg HK – Hypo Niederösterreich	27-23
12.2.	Nordstrand 2000 – Volgograd AKVA	19-23
19.2.	Viborg HK – Nordstrand 2000	24-17
20.2.	Volgograd AKVA – Hypo Niederösterreich	30-23

Team	Matches	Goals	Point
(Denmark) Viborg HK	6	173-141	8
(Austria) Hypo Niederösterreich	6	174-157	8
(Russia) Volgograd AKVA	6	164-160	8
(Norway) Nordstrand 2000	6	119-172	0

==== Group C ====
Date	Kamp	Res.
9.1.	HC Motor Zaporizhzhia – Kometal Gjorce Petrov	20-22
9.1.	HC Lada Togliatti – Slagelse FH	24-25
15.1.	Kometal Gjorce Petrov – HC Lada Togliatti	27-25
16.1.	Slagelse FH – HC Motor Zaporizhzhia	27-22
22.1.	HC Lada Togliatti – HC Motor Zaporizhzhia	26-21
22.1.	Kometal Gjorce Petrov – Slagelse FH	20-12
29.1.	HC Lada Togliatti – Kometal Gjorce Petrov	24-23
30.1.	HC Motor Zaporizhzhia – Slagelse FH	19-30
12.2.	Kometal Gjorce Petrov – HC Motor Zaporizhzhia	32-20
13.2.	Slagelse FH – HC Lada Togliatti	33-27
20.2.	HC Motor Zaporizhzhia – HC Lada Togliatti	30-22
20.2.	Slagelse FH – Kometal Gjorce Petrov	26-22

Team	Matches	Goals	Point
(Denmark) Slagelse FH	6	153-134	10
(North Macedonia) Kometal Gjorce Petrov	6	146-127	8
(Russia) HC Lada Togliatti	6	148-159	4
(Ukraine) HC Motor Zaporizhzhia	6	132-159	2

==== Group D ====
Date	Kamp	Res.
8.1.	Tertnes IL – Orsan Elda Prestigio	25-33
8.1.	RK DIN Nis – Krim Ljubljana	23-24
15.1.	Orsan Elda Prestigio – RK DIN Nis	26-18
15.1.	Krim Ljubljana – Tertnes IL	32-18
22.1.	Orsan Elda Prestigio – Krim Ljubljana	25-30
22.1.	RK DIN Nis – Tertnes IL	24-25
29.1.	Tertnes IL – Krim Ljubljana	22-24
29.1.	RK DIN Nis – Orsan Elda Prestigio	27-27
12.2.	Orsan Elda Prestigio – Tertnes IL	28-28
12.2.	Krim Ljubljana – RK DIN Nis	40-30
19.2.	Tertnes IL – RK DIN Nis	31-25
19.2.	Krim Ljubljana – Orsan Elda Prestigio	28-22

Team	Matches	Goals	Point
(Slovenia) Krim Ljubljana	6	178-140	12
(Spain) Orsan Elda Prestigio	6	161-156	6
(Norway) Tertnes IL	6	149-166	5
(Serbia and Montenegro) RK DIN Nis	6	147-173	1

=== Quarter finals ===
Date		Home Team - 1st match	Home Team - 2nd match	Results		
1st match	2nd match	Home Team - 1st match	Home Team - 2nd match	1st match	2nd match	agg.
11.3.	19.3.	(Austria) Hypo Niederösterreich	(Denmark) Ikast-Bording EH	32-27	31-32	63–59
13.3.	19.3.	(Hungary) Dunaferr SE	(Denmark) Viborg HK	27-26	31-30	58–56
12.3.	20.3.	(Spain) Orsan Elda Prestigio	(Denmark) Slagelse FH	31-34	21-28	52–62
12.3.	19.3.	(North Macedonia) Kometal Gjorce Petrov	(Slovenia) Krim Ljubljana	24-21	21-23	45–44

=== Semi finals ===
Date		Home Team - 1st match	Home Team - 2nd match	Results		
1st match	2nd match	Home Team - 1st match	Home Team - 2nd match	1st match	2nd match	agg.
10.4.	17.4.	(Hungary) Dunaferr SE	(Denmark) Slagelse FH	25-28	17-21	42–49
8.4.	16.4.	(Austria) Hypo Niederösterreich	(North Macedonia) Kometal Gjorce Petrov	32-30	18-22	50–52

=== Final ===
Date		Home Team - 1st match	Home Team - 2nd match	Results		
1st match	2nd match	Home Team - 1st match	Home Team - 2nd match	1st match	2nd match	agg.
14.5.	20.5.	(Denmark) Slagelse FH	(North Macedonia) Kometal Gjorce Petrov	27-23	27-20	54–43
