= Irina Poltoratskaya =

Russian handball player (born 1979)

Personal information
- Full name: Irina Igorevna Poltoratskaya
- Nationality: Russian
- Born: 12 March 1979 (age 47) Antratsyt, Rissia
- Height: 177 cm (70 in)

Sport
- Sport: Handball
- Position: Centre back

Senior clubs
- Years: Team
- 1997-2000: Istochnik Rostov-on-Don
- 2000-2004: Lada Togliatti
- 2004-2006: Slagelse FH
- 2006-2010: Zvezda Zvenigorod
National team
- Years: Team
- 1999-2008: Russia

Teams managed
- 2017-2018: ŽRK Vardar
- 2023-: Rostov-Don
Medal record
Olympic Games
| Silver medal – second place | 2008 Beijing | Team |
World Championship
| Gold medal – first place | 2001 Italy | Team |
| Gold medal – first place | 2005 Russia | Team |
| Gold medal – first place | 2007 France | Team |
European Championship
| Silver medal – second place | 2006 Sweden | Team |
| Bronze medal – third place | 2000 Romania | Team |
| Bronze medal – third place | 2008 Macedonia | Team |

Irina Igorevna Poltoratskaya (Russian: Ирина Игоревна Полторацкая, born 12 March 1979 in Antratsyt, Luhansk Oblast, Ukrainian SSR) is a Russian team handball player and handball coach, who manages Rostov-Don in the Russian League. In her playing days she played on the Russian women's national handball team. She won World Championship gold medals with the Russian team in the 2001, 2005 in Saint Petersburg, Russia, and the 2007 World Championship in France.

She was included in the European Handball Federation Hall of Fame in 2023.

== Career ==
Poltoratskaya started her handball career at Istochnik Rostov-on-Don, where she won the Russian championship in her first season. In 2000 she joined league rivals Lada Togliatti. Here she won the Russian championship in 2002, 2003 and 2004 and the EHF Cup Winners' Cup in 2002.

Irina's career in Russia was halted by a knee injury. Anja Andersen, the coach of Slagelse Dream Team, Denmark brought Irina to Slagelse DT in 2004, and a few months later she underwent surgery and got a new meniscus. The operation was successful, and only a year later did Irina return to the field. In the EHF Champions League the same season, Irina scored on penalties for Slagelse in the final. Afterwards she gave Anja Andersen her gold medal from the World Cup, as a thank you for helping her return to the world of handball. This was the first time a Danish club won the Champions League.

Irina left Slagelse after 2 years and returned to the Russia to join Zvezda Zvenigorod. Here she won the Russian Championship and the EHF European League in 2007, and the EHF Champions League and the EHF Champions Trophy in 2008. She retired in 2010.

== Coaching career ==
In March 2017 she took over the Macedonian team ŽRK Vardar. Under her leadership the club won the domestic double in both 2017 and 2018 and reached the final of the EHF Champions League in both seasons. In 2018 she retired from the position.

She was later offered the position as the assistant coach of the Russian national team, but declined it citing family reasons.

Since 2023 she has been the head coach of Rostov-Don in the Russian top league.

== Private life ==
She is the wife of Russian handball player Timur Dibirov. They have two kids together.

== Individual awards ==
- MVP of 2007 EHF Women's Champions Trophy
- EHF Hall of Fame in 2023.
