= 2007 EHF Women's Champions Trophy =

EHF Women's Champions Trophy
- 2007

Tournament information
- Sport: Handball
- Dates: 22 September 2007–23 September 2007
- Teams: 4
- Website: eurohandball.com

Final positions
- Champions: (Romania) Oltchim Râmnicu Vâlcea
- Runner-up: (Russia) Zvezda Zvenigorod

Tournament statistics
- Top scorer(s): (Serbia) Ana Batinić (75 goals)

The 2007 EHF Women's Champions Trophy was the 12th edition of the EHF Super Cup in new format. It started on 22 September 2007.

The event was organised at the Sala Sporturilor Traian by the 2006–07 Cup Winners’ Cup winner, Oltchim Râmnicu Vâlcea.

In front of sold out crowd, Oltchim Râmnicu Vâlcea won the title for the first time in their history after defeating in the final Zvezda Zvenigorod, the winners of the 2006–07 Women's EHF Cup and the eventual winners of the 2007–08 EHF Champions League. Slagelse Dream Team, the winners of the 2006–07 EHF Champions League, won the fight for third place.

== Knockout stage ==
=== Bracket ===
Semifinals
22 September
(Denmark) Slagelse DT | 27
(Russia) Zvezda Zvenigorod | 33
22 September
(Romania) Oltchim Vâlcea | 31
(Russia) Lada Togliatti | 23

Final
23 September
(Romania) Oltchim Vâlcea | 23
(Russia) Zvezda Zvenigorod | 19
Third place
23 September
(Denmark) Slagelse DT (Pen.) | 35
(Russia) Lada Togliatti | 34

== Awards and statistics ==
- MVP: Irina Poltoratskaya (RUS) (Zvezda Zvenigorod)
- Best goalkeeper: Luminița Dinu (ROU) (Oltchim Râmnicu Vâlcea)
