= Jelena Erić =

Jelena Erić may refer to:

- Jelena Erić (handballer)
- Jelena Erić (cyclist)
