= Mette Melgaard =

Danish handball player (born 1980)

Personal information
- Nationality: Danish
- Born: 3 June 1980 (age 46) Rønde, Denmark
- Height: 1.70 m (5 ft 7 in)

Sport
- Sport: Handball
- Position: Line player

Senior clubs
- Years: Team
- –2001: Brabrand IF
- 2001–2008: Slagelse FH
- 2008–2010: FCK Håndbold
- 2010–2012: Randers HK
National team
Years	Team	Apps	(Gls)
2001–2012	Denmark	82	(88)

Teams managed
- 2017–2019: Team Esbjerg (Assistant coach)
- Updated on 7 December 2023

Mette Melgaard (born 3 June 1980) is a Danish handball coach and former player. She was the assistant coach for Team Esbjerg in the Danish Damehåndboldligaen from 2017 to 2019.

At the 2010 European Women's Handball Championship she reached the bronze final and placed fourth with the Danish team.

With Slagelse DT she won the Danish League in 2003, 2005 and 2007, the DHF Handball Cup in 2002 and the EHF Women's Champions League in 2004, 2005 and 2007. In 2007 she was on the Danish league all star team as the pivot player.

== Personal life ==
She was previously in a relationship with Anja Andersen.

== Achievements ==
=== Club ===
- Damehåndboldligaen:
  - Winner: 2003, 2005, 2007, 2012
  - Silver Medalist: 2011
  - Bronze Medalist: 2009, 2010
- Landspokalturneringen:
  - Winner: 2002, 2009
- EHF Champions League:
  - Winner: 2004, 2005, 2007
- EHF Cup:
  - Winner: 2003
- EHF Cup Winners' Cup:
  - Winner: 2009

=== Individual ===
- 2002: Landspokalturneringen's Most Valuable Player
- 2006-2007: Damehåndboldligaen's All-Star Team
