= Bojana Popović =

Serbian / Montenegrin handball player (born 1979)

Personal information
- Nationality: Montenegrin
- Born: 20 November 1979 (age 46) Niš, SR Serbia, SFR Yugoslavia
- Height: 1.85 m (6 ft 1 in)

Sport
- Sport: Handball
- Position: Left back

Senior clubs
- Years: Team
- 1994–1998: RK DIN Niš
- 1998–2002: ŽRK Budućnost
- 2002–2007: Slagelse DT
- 2007–2010: Viborg HK
- 2010–2012: ŽRK Budućnost
National team
Years	Team	Apps	(Gls)
2009–2016	Montenegro	61	(315)

Teams managed
- 2016–2021: Montenegro (Assistant coach)
- 2020–2025: Budućnost (Head coach)
- 2021–2024: Montenegro (Head coach)
- 2025–: Denmark (Assistant coach)
- 2025–2026: CSM Bucuresti
Medal record
Representing Montenegro
Olympic Games
Silver medal – second place	2012 London	Team
Representing FR Yugoslavia
World Championships
Bronze medal – third place	2001 Italy

Bojana Popović née Petrović, (born 20 November 1979) is a Montenegrin handball coach and retired handballer. She is the former head coach of ŽRK Budućnost , and also serves as assistant coach of Helle Thomsen for the Danish national team.

She is considered by many to be the best female handball player of the 2000s, despite not being given any official recognition. After winning the Women's EHF Champions League with Budućnost and a silver medal at the 2012 Olympic Games with the Montenegro national team, Bojana Popović decided to retire from handball. However, in June 2016 Popović announced she would come out of retirement and make herself available for selection by the Montenegro national handball team to compete at the 2016 Summer Olympics in Rio de Janeiro.

== Career ==
Bojana Popović started playing handball at Serbian club HC Naisa Niš when she was eleven years old. She later played for Montenegrin club Budućnost Podgorica for four seasons. In 2002, Popović signed a contract with Danish team Slagelse DT, at that time coached by Anja Andersen. With Slagelse, she experienced great success: three times Champions League winner, EHF Cup winner, three Danish Championship golds and one Danish Cup.

At the end of the 2006/07 season, Popović signed a contract with Viborg HK. Since her arrival at Viborg, she has won two Danish Championship golds and two Danish Cups. In 2009 she won her fourth Champions League title, the first with Viborg. She left the club in 2010 to return to Montenegro due to personal reasons. At the time she had two years left on her contract. She then signed at contract with ZRK Buducnost, where she won the Montenegrin Championship and the Montenegrin Cup in both 2011 and 2012. After the 2011-12 season she retired.

== Coaching career ==
In August 2016 Popovic became the Interim coach for the Montenegro women's national handball team, after Dragan Adžić had left the team following a disappointing result at the 2016 Olympics. Just after month Adžić came back to the position, and Popovic switched to being the assistant coach.

From 2020 to 2025 she was the head coach of ŽRK Budućnost. Here she won the Montenegrin Championship in 2022, 2023, 2024 and 2025. Meanwhile from March 2021 until 2024, she was the head coach of the Montenegro women's national handball team. At the 2022 European Championship she guided the Montenegrin team to a bronze medal, losing to Denmark in the semifinal and beating France in the third place play-off.

In August 2025 she became the assistant coach to the Denmark women's national handball team under newly appointed Helle Thomsen. She signed a contract until 31 December 2026.

December 1st 2025 she became the head coach of Romanian team CSM Bucuresti alongside being the assistant coach of the Danish national team. Almost one year later whereas her contract as head coach of Romanian CSM Bucuresti is terminated with immediate effect, she extended her contract as an assistant coach of the Danish national team.

== Achievements ==
=== As player ===
==== National team ====
- Olympic Games:
  - Silver Medalist: 2012
- World Championship:
  - Bronze Medalist: 2001

==== European ====
- EHF Champions League:
  - Winner: 2003/2004, 2004/2005, 2006/2007, 2008/2009, 2009/2010, 2011/2012
- EHF Cup:
  - Winner: 2002/2003

==== Domestic ====
- Damehåndboldligaen:
  - Winner: 2002/2003, 2004/2005, 2006/2007, 2007/2008, 2008/2009, 2009/2010
- Danish Cup:
  - Winner: 2001/2002, 2006/2007, 2007/2008
- Serbian and Montenegrin Championship:
  - Winner: 1999, 2000, 2001 and 2002
- Serbian and Montenegrin Cup:
  - Winner: 2000, 2001, 2002
- Montenegrin Prva Liga:
  - Winner: 2010/2011, 2011/2012
- Montenegrin Cup:
  - Winner: 2011, 2012

=== As coach ===
==== Domestic ====
- Montenegrin Prva Liga:
  - Winner: 2021, 2022, 2023, 2024, 2025
- Montenegrin Cup:
  - Winner: 2021, 2022, 2023, 2024, 2025

==== National team ====
- European Championship:
  - Bronze Medalist: 2022

== Awards and recognition ==
During her handball career, Bojana Popović was considered to be the best player in the world by many. She has been chosen Player of the Year by the Danish Handball Federation four times. Popović's individual awards and achievements include:

- Player of the year in Denmark in 2004, 2005, 2007 and 2008
- Topscorer of the Danish League 2003/04 and 2004/05
- Topscorer of the Champions League in 2004, 2005 and 2007
- "Cup Fighter" (Danish: Pokalfighter) 2008
- Montenegrin Sportsperson of the Year: 2012
- EHF Hall of Fame in 2023.

== Private ==
Bojana Popovic' husband Petar Popovic is a professional basketball player. In 2013 the couple got a daughter.

Awards
Preceded by Srđan Mrvaljević	Montenegrin Sportsperson of the Year; 2012 (with Katarina Bulatović)	Succeeded by Nikola Janović
Olympic Games
Preceded by Srđan Mrvaljević	Flagbearer for Montenegro; Rio de Janeiro 2016	Succeeded by Incumbent
