= Slagelse FH =

Danish handball club

Slagelse FH / Slagelse DT
- Full name: Slagelse Forenede Håndboldklubber / Slagelse Dream Team
- Founded: 1997
- Dissolved: 2013
- Arena: Antvorskovhallen
- Capacity: 1.310
- Club colours
Home	Away

Slagelse Dream Team was a handball team from the town of Slagelse, Denmark. It is sometimes referred to as "Slagelse Dream Team" or just "Slagelse DT", and is the professional first team for the handball club Slagelse Forenede Håndboldklubber (Slagelse FH). The club was catapulted into the limelight in 2000 when Anja Andersen took the head coach job and in a very short time led the women's team to the first Danish victory in the Women's EHF Champions League final in 2004.

== History ==
Slagelse Forenede Håndboldklubber was created by a merger of the two clubs Slagelse HK and Marievang IF who each had their own success, especially on youth level. Slagelse HK's women's team was promoted twice to the premier division around 1990, though the team was relegated the following season on both occasions.

In 1997 the two clubs merged under the name Slagelse FH and in early 2000 the club signed a deal with Anja Andersen to help the club achieve promotion to the premier division in 2001.

In 2002 they won their first title the Danish Women's Handball Cup. This was followed by a league title in 2003 and the Women's EHF Champions League title in 2004. This was only the second time a Danish team won the biggest European trophy, after HG København in 1965.

Anja Andersen ceased to be the head coach after the 2007-08 season, which meant that a large group of players also which the team, and the amount of spectators and sponsorship income started to decline.

In the 2008-09 season the team came close to bankruptcy, and was relegated to the Danish 1st Division. The team was promoted again in 2010-2011.

In 2013 the club declared bankruptcy and was forced to be relegated to the Danish 2nd Division.

== Notable former players ==
- (Denmark) Camilla Andersen (2001–2004)
- (Denmark) Louise Pedersen (2007–2008)
- (Denmark) Line Hovgaard (2004–2008)
- (Denmark) Rikke Hørlykke (2004–2006)
- (Denmark) Janne Kolling (2000–2001)
- (Denmark) Christina Krogshede (2006–2008)
- (Denmark) Anne Loft (2003–2008)
- (Denmark) Sofie Steffensen (2005–2007)
- (Denmark) Marianne Bonde (2007–2008)
- (Denmark) Kamilla Kristensen (2001–2007)
- (Denmark) Mette Melgaard (2001–2008)
- (Denmark) Rikke Schmidt (2002–2005)
- (Norway) Mia Hundvin (2001–2003)
- (Norway) Cecilie Leganger (2005–2008)
- (Slovenia) Anja Frešer (2003–2004)
- (Sweden) Jenny Lindblom (2002–2003)
- (Montenegro) Ana Batinić (2005–2008)
- (Montenegro) Katarina Bulatovic (2006–2007)
- (Montenegro) Bojana Popović (2002–2007)
- (Montenegro) Maja Savić (2004–2008)
- (Austria) Ausra Fridrikas (2002–2005)
- (Austria) Gabriela Rotis (2007–2008)
- (France) Stéphanie Cano (2003–2004)
- (South Korea) Hong Jeong-ho (2000–2003)
- (South Korea) Lee Sang Eun (2002)
- (North Macedonia) Valentina Radulovic (2003–2005)
- (Romania) Carmen Lungu (2005–2007)
- (Russia) Irina Poltoratskaya (2004–2006)
- (Russia) Emiliya Turey (2005–2008)
- (Serbia) Anja Obradović (2006–2007)
- (Serbia) Suzana Cubela (2006–2008)
- (Serbia) Svetlana Ognjenović (2007–2008)
- (Serbia) Andrijana Budimir (2004–2006)
- (Serbia) Ivana Mladenovic (2006–2007)
- (Lithuania) Rugile Kliukaite (2004–2006)
- (Croatia) Maja Mitrovic (2003–2004)
- (Hungary) Nikolett Brigovácz (2001–2002)

== Results ==
- Danish Championship:
  - Gold: 2003, 2005, 2007
  - Silver: 2004, 2006
- Champions League:
  - Winner: 2004, 2005, 2007
- EHF Cup:
  - Winner: 2003
- EHF Champions Trophy:
  - Finalist: 2003
  - Third place: 2007
