= 2003–04 EHF Women's Champions League =

The 2003–2004 EHF Women's Champions League was the 11th edition of the modern era of the EHF's premier competition for women's handball clubs, and the 44th overall. Slagelse FH won the tournament as the second Danish team ever, and the first in the modern era.

== Results ==
=== First qualification ===
| Date | | Home team in the 1. Match | Home team in the 2. Match | result | | |
| 1. Match | 2. Match | Home team in the 1. Match | Home team in the 2. Match | 1. Match | 2. Match | Agg. |
|---|---|---|---|---|---|---|
| 13.9. | 21.9. | (Slovakia) Iuventa Michalovce | (Romania) CS Rapid CFR Bucuresti | 30-30 | 23-33 | 53–63 |
| 13.9. | 20.9. | (Greece) GAS Anagennisi Artas | (Netherlands) Zeeman Vastgoed SEW | 25-20 | 23-24 | 48–44 |
| 13.9. | 14.9. | (Poland) MKS Montex Lublin | (Belarus) BNTU Minsk Region | 29-25 | 27-22 | 56–47 |
| 13.9. | 20.9. | (Portugal) Madeira Andebol SAD | (Germany) DJK / MJC Trier | 25-29 | 25-27 | 50–56 |
| 13.9. | 14.9. | (Switzerland) LC Brühl | (Croatia) Podravka Vegeta | 18-42 | 22-33 | 40–75 |

=== Second qualification round ===
| Date | | Home team in the 1. Match | Home team in the 2. Match | result | | |
| 1. Match | 2. Match | Home team in the 1. Match | Home team in the 2. Match | 1. Match | 2. Match | Agg. |
|---|---|---|---|---|---|---|
| 12.10. | 18.10. | (Hungary) Ferencváros | (Greece) GAS Anagennisi Artas | 38-24 | 25-30 | 63–54 |
| 18.10. | 19.10. | (North Macedonia) Eurostandard G. P. Skopje | (Poland) MKS Montex Lublin | 23-25 | 26-25 | 49–50 |
| 12.10. | 18.10. | (France) ESBF Besançon | (Ukraine) HC Motor Zaporizhzhia | 27-23 | 21-27 | 48–50 |
| 11.10. | 12.10. | (Slovenia) RK Piran | (Germany) DJK / MJC Trier | 26-31 | 30-37 | 56–68 |
| 12.10. | 19.10. | (Russia) Volgograd AKVA | (Serbia and Montenegro) RK DIN-Classic | 21-16 | 20-27 | 41–43 |
| 10.10. | 18.10. | (Austria) Hypo Niederösterreich | (Norway) Nordstrand 2000 | 22-22 | 25-21 | 47–43 |
| 12.10. | 18.10. | (Denmark) Ikast-Bording EH | (Croatia) Podravka Vegeta | 44-32 | 26-21 | 70–53 |
| 11.10. | 19.10. | (Spain) El Osito L'Eliana Valencia | (Romania) CS Rapid CFR Bucuresti | 32-24 | 22-26 | 54–50 |

=== Group stage ===
==== Group A ====
| Date | Match | Res. |
|---|---|---|
| 3.1. | El Osito L'Eliana Valencia - HC Lada Togliatti | 24-33 |
| 6.1. | DJK / MJC Trier - Dunaferr SE | 24-24 |
| 10.1. | HC Lada Togliatti - DJK / MJC Trier | 31-24 |
| 11.1. | Dunaferr SE - El Osito L'Eliana Valencia | 26-23 |
| 17.1. | DJK / MJC Trier - El Osito L'Eliana Valencia | 28-24 |
| 17.1. | HC Lada Togliatti - Dunaferr SE | 21-22 |
| 7.2. | DJK / MJC Trier - HC Lada Togliatti | 23-32 |
| 7.2. | El Osito L'Eliana Valencia - Dunaferr SE | 28-27 |
| 14.2. | HC Lada Togliatti - El Osito L'Eliana Valencia | 29-26 |
| 15.2. | Dunaferr SE - DJK / MJC Trier | 30-22 |
| 21.2. | El Osito L'Eliana Valencia - DJK / MJC Trier | 35-20 |
| 21.2. | Dunaferr SE - HC Lada Togliatti | 29-28 |

| Team | Matches | Goals | Point |
|---|---|---|---|
| (Hungary) Dunaferr SE | 6 | 158-146 | 9 |
| (Russia) HC Lada Togliatti | 6 | 174-148 | 8 |
| (Spain) El Osito L'Eliana Valencia | 6 | 160-163 | 4 |
| (Germany) DJK / MJC Trier | 6 | 141-176 | 3 |

==== Group B ====
| Date | Match | Res. |
|---|---|---|
| 4.1. | HC Motor Zaporizhzhia - Krim Ljubljana | 26-33 |
| 4.1. | Ikast-Bording EH - RK Buducnost MONET | 30-22 |
| 10.1. | Krim Ljubljana - Ikast-Bording EH | 24-27 |
| 11.1. | RK Buducnost MONET - HC Motor Zaporizhzhia | 27-25 |
| 18.1. | HC Motor Zaporizhzhia - Ikast-Bording EH | 29-26 |
| 18.1. | RK Buducnost MONET - Krim Ljubljana | 26-24 |
| 8.2. | HC Motor Zaporizhzhia - RK Buducnost MONET | 26-28 |
| 8.2. | Ikast-Bording EH - Krim Ljubljana | 24-28 |
| 14.2. | Krim Ljubljana - HC Motor Zaporizhzhia | 34-22 |
| 15.2. | RK Buducnost MONET - Ikast-Bording EH | 31-19 |
| 21.2. | Krim Ljubljana - RK Buducnost MONET | 35-25 |
| 22.2. | Ikast-Bording EH - HC Motor Zaporizhzhia | 36-25 |

| Team | Matches | Goals | Point |
|---|---|---|---|
| (Slovenia) Krim Ljubljana | 6 | 178-150 | 8 |
| (Serbia and Montenegro) RK Buducnost MONET | 6 | 159-159 | 8 |
| (Denmark) Ikast-Bording EH | 6 | 162-159 | 6 |
| (Ukraine) HC Motor Zaporizhzhia | 6 | 153-184 | 2 |

==== Group C ====
| Date | Match | Res. |
|---|---|---|
| 3.1. | Hypo Niederösterreich - Kometal Gjorce Petrov | 25-23 |
| 4.1. | RK DIN-Classic - Slagelse FH | 28-32 |
| 10.1. | Slagelse FH - Hypo Niederösterreich | 38-26 |
| 10.1. | Kometal Gjorce Petrov - RK DIN-Classic | 29-23 |
| 16.1. | Slagelse FH - Kometal Gjorce Petrov | 29-27 |
| 16.1. | Hypo Niederösterreich - RK DIN-Classic | 28-23 |
| 8.2. | RK DIN-Classic - Kometal Gjorce Petrov | 29-31 |
| 9.2. | Hypo Niederösterreich - Slagelse FH | 27-29 |
| 14.2. | Slagelse FH - RK DIN-Classic | 31-25 |
| 15.2. | Kometal Gjorce Petrov - Hypo Niederösterreich | 25-23 |
| 21.2. | Kometal Gjorce Petrov - Slagelse FH | 19-19 |
| 22.2. | RK DIN-Classic - Hypo Niederösterreich | 28-30 |

| Team | Matches | Goals | Point |
|---|---|---|---|
| (Denmark) Slagelse FH | 6 | 178-152 | 11 |
| (North Macedonia) Kometal Gjorce Petrov | 6 | 154-148 | 7 |
| (Austria) Hypo Niederösterreich | 6 | 159-166 | 6 |
| (Serbia and Montenegro) RK DIN-Classic | 6 | 156-181 | 0 |

==== Group D ====
| Date | Match | Res. |
|---|---|---|
| 3.1. | Ferencvaros - Alsa Elda Prestigio | 30-26 |
| 4.1. | KS BYSTRZYCA Lublin - Larvik HK | 25-32 |
| 10.1. | Alsa Elda Prestigio - KS BYSTRZYCA Lublin | 31-20 |
| 11.1. | Larvik HK - Ferencvaros | 29-22 |
| 17.1. | Ferencvaros - KS BYSTRZYCA Lublin | 32-24 |
| 18.1. | Larvik HK - Alsa Elda Prestigio | 38-23 |
| 7.2. | Ferencvaros - Larvik HK | 29-26 |
| 8.2. | KS BYSTRZYCA Lublin - Alsa Elda Prestigio | 33-30 |
| 14.2. | Alsa Elda Prestigio - Ferencvaros | 29-24 |
| 15.2. | Larvik HK - KS BYSTRZYCA Lublin | 33-26 |
| 21.2. | Alsa Elda Prestigio - Larvik HK | 25-25 |
| 22.2. | KS BYSTRZYCA Lublin - Ferencvaros | 27-28 |

| Team | Matches | Goals | Point |
|---|---|---|---|
| (Norway) Larvik HK | 6 | 183-150 | 9 |
| (Hungary) Ferencváros | 6 | 165-161 | 8 |
| (Spain) Alsa Elda Prestigio | 6 | 164-170 | 5 |
| (Poland) KS BYSTRZYCA Lublin | 6 | 155-186 | 2 |

=== Quarter finals ===
| Date | | Home team - 1st match | Home team - 2nd match | Results | | |
| 1st match | 2nd match | Home team - 1st match | Home team - 2nd match | 1st match | 2nd match | agg. |
|---|---|---|---|---|---|---|
| 14.3. | 20.3. | (Serbia and Montenegro) RK Buducnost MONET | (Hungary) Dunaferr SE | 26-31 | 24-29 | 50–60 |
| 13.3. | 21.3. | (Russia) HC Lada Togliatti | (Slovenia) Krim Ljubljana | 24-21 | 25-29 | 49–50 |
| 14.3. | 21.3. | (Hungary) Ferencváros | (Denmark) Slagelse FH | 30-28 | 25-32 | 55–60 |
| 12.3. | 21.3. | (North Macedonia) Kometal Djorce Petrov | (Norway) Larvik HK | 25-22 | 27-33 | 52–55 |

=== Semi finals ===
| Date | | Home team - 1st match | Home team - 2nd match | Results | | |
| 1st match | 2nd match | Home team - 1st match | Home team - 2nd match | 1st match | 2nd match | agg. |
|---|---|---|---|---|---|---|
| 17.4. | 24.4. | (Norway) Larvik HK | (Slovenia) Krim Ljubljana | 30-33 | 19-27 | 49–60 |
| 18.4. | 25.4. | (Hungary) Dunaferr SE | (Denmark) Slagelse FH | 34-29 | 22-32 | 56–61 |

=== Final ===
| Date | | Home team - 1st match | Home team - 2nd match | Result | | |
| 1st match | 2nd match | Home team - 1st match | Home team - 2nd match | 1st match | 2nd match | agg. |
|---|---|---|---|---|---|---|
| 15.5. | 20.5. | (Denmark) Slagelse FH | (Slovenia) Krim Ljubljana | 25-24 | 36-32 | 61–56 |

== Top scorers ==
| Name | Team | Goals |
|---|---|---|
| (Montenegro) Bojana Popović | Slagelse FH | 98 |
| (Ukraine) Nataliya Derepasko | RK Krim | 84 |
| (Austria) Tatjana Logvin | RK Krim | 71 |
