= Lucia Súkenníková =

Slovak handball player (born 1988)

Lucia Súkenníková Mikulčík
Personal information
- Nationality: Slovak
- Born: 22 June 1988 (age 38) Trnava, Czechoslovakia
- Height: 1.65 m (5 ft 5 in)

Sport
- Sport: Handball
- Position: Left wing
- Current club: DHK Baník Most
- Number: 22
National team
Years	Team	Apps	(Gls)
–	Slovakia	45	(101)

Lucia Súkenníková Mikulčík (born 22 June 1988) is a Slovak handball player for DHK Baník Most and the Slovak national team.
