= Alexandrina Cabral =

Handball player (born 1986)

Alexandrina Barbosa
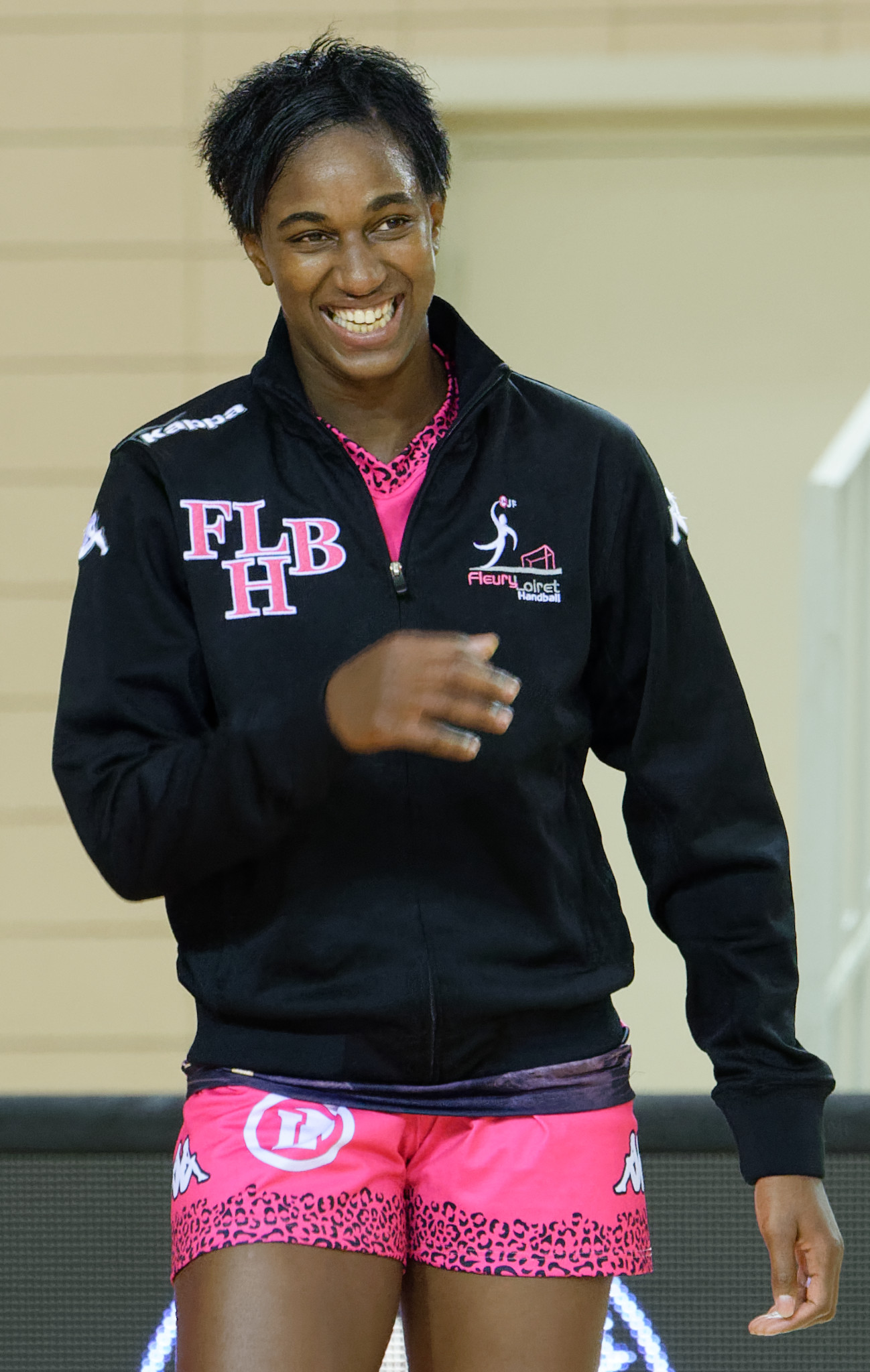
- Alexandrina Barbosa in 2015

Personal information
- Full name: Alexandrina Cabral Barbosa
- Nationality: Portuguese, Spanish
- Born: 5 May 1986 (age 40) Lisbon, Portugal
- Height: 1.75 m (5 ft 9 in)

Sport
- Sport: Handball
- Position: Left back

Senior clubs
- Years: Team
- 2003–2005: Madeira Andebol SAD
- 2005–2008: BM Sagunto
- 2008–2010: Rulmentul Braşov
- 2010–2012: SD Itxako
- 2012–2013: CS Oltchim Vâlcea
- 2013–2014: Thüringer HC
- 2014–2016: Fleury Loiret HB
- 2016–2018: Rostov-Don
- 2018–2020: Nantes Handball
- 2020–2021: CSM București
- 2021–2022: CS Gloria Bistrița-Năsăud
- 2022–2023: BM Morvedre
- 2023–2024: Brest Bretagne Handball
- 2024-2026: AC Life style Erice
National team
| Years | Team | | |
| – | Portugal | | |
| 2012–2024 | Spain | 166 | (750) |
Medal record
World Championship
| Silver medal – second place | 2019 Japan |
European Championship
| Silver medal – second place | 2014 Croatia/Hungary |

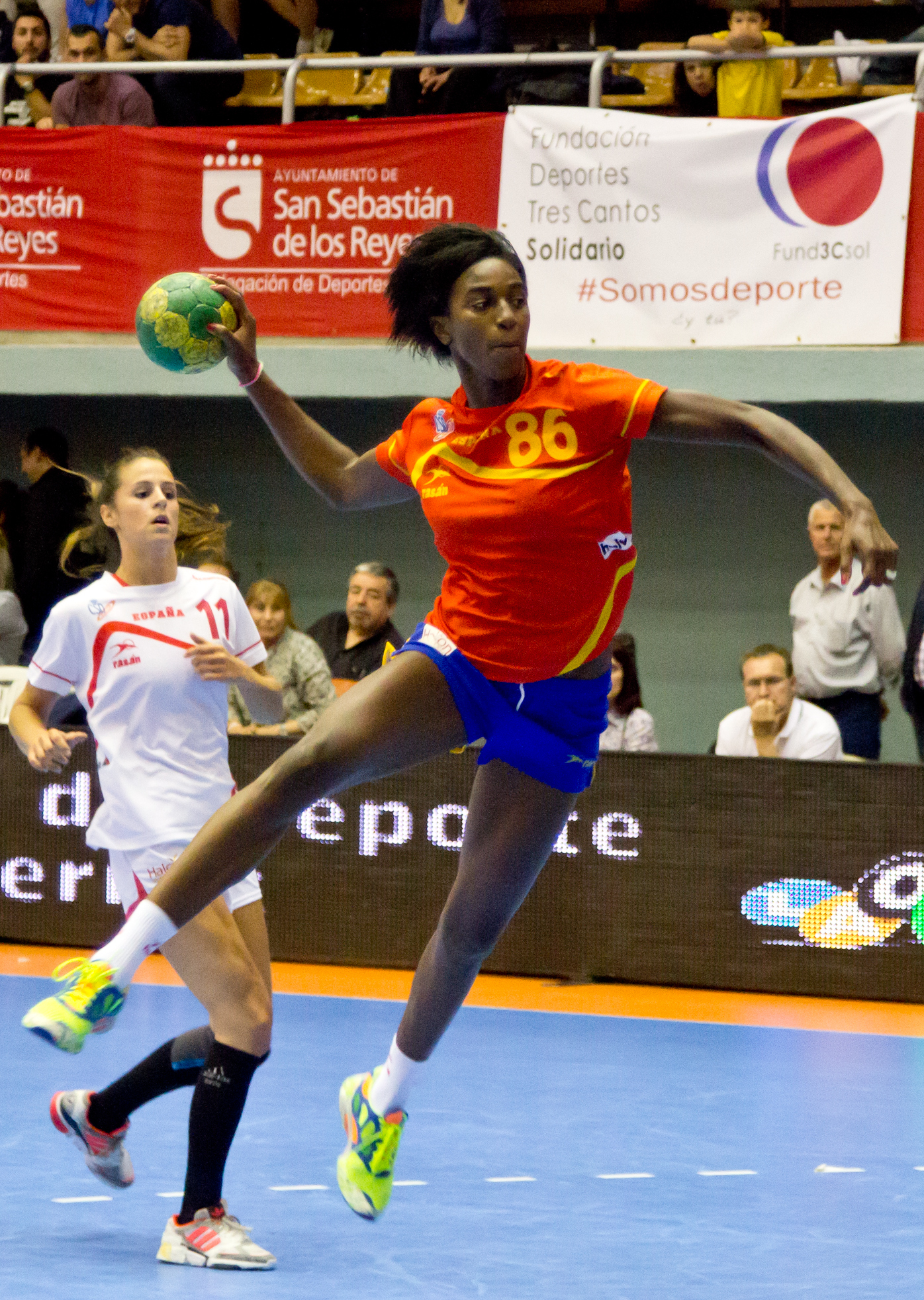
Handball All Star Game 2013, held in San Sebastián de los Reyes, Madrid, Spain. 8 June 2013

Alexandrina Cabral Barbosa (born 5 May 1986), also known as Alexandrina Cabral or Alexandrina Barbosa or Shandy Barbosa, is a former handballer who last played for Brest Bretagne Handball. Born in Portugal, she represented Spain at international level. She retired after the 2024 Paris Olympics.

She played the 2024-2025 and 2025-2026 season for AC Life style Erice. She left the team after winning the Italian Championship in 2026.

== Personal life ==
Barbosa was born in Lisbon, Portugal, as ninth of 11 siblings. She took up handball in Portugal, but in April 2010 was suspended for two weeks after refusing to attend a training camp. After that she moved to Spain and received Spanish citizenship in June 2012. Whenever possible she wears number 86 during the game because it is the year of her birth.

== Career ==
=== Club ===
Barbosa was amongst the top 10 scorers of EHF Women's Champions League in the 2005–06 season playing for CBM Astroc Sagunto, with 46 goals in the old format of the competition.

Playing for SD Itxako, she was the fifth best goal scorer of EHF Champions League in the 2010–11 season and fourth in 2011–12.

In April 2012, she signed for the Romanian top club CS Oltchim Râmnicu Vâlcea.

=== International ===
In 2012, after playing for many years in Spain, she obtained Spanish citizenship and decided to represent Spain on the international level.

== Achievements ==
- Spanish Championship:
  - Winner: 2011, 2012
- Spanish Cup:
  - Winner: 2012
- Romanian Championship:
  - Silver Medalist: 2009
- EHF Champions League:
  - Finalist: 2011
  - Semifinalist: 2006, 2013
- Women's EHF Cup:
  - Winner: 2016
  - Semifinalist: 2009
- [./Https://it.wikipedia.org/wiki/Coppa_Italia_2024-2025_(pallamano_femminile) Italian Cup]:
  - Winner: 2025; Finalist: 2026

== Individual awards ==
- Carpathian Trophy Most Valuable Player: 2013
- French Championship Best Left Back: 2015, 2016
- EHF Cup Winners' Cup Top Scorer: 2015
- All-Star Team Best Left back of the World Championship: 2019

== See also ==
- List of women's handballers with 1000 or more international goals
