= Magvassy Mihály Sportcsarnok =

Multi-use indoor arena in Győr, Hungary

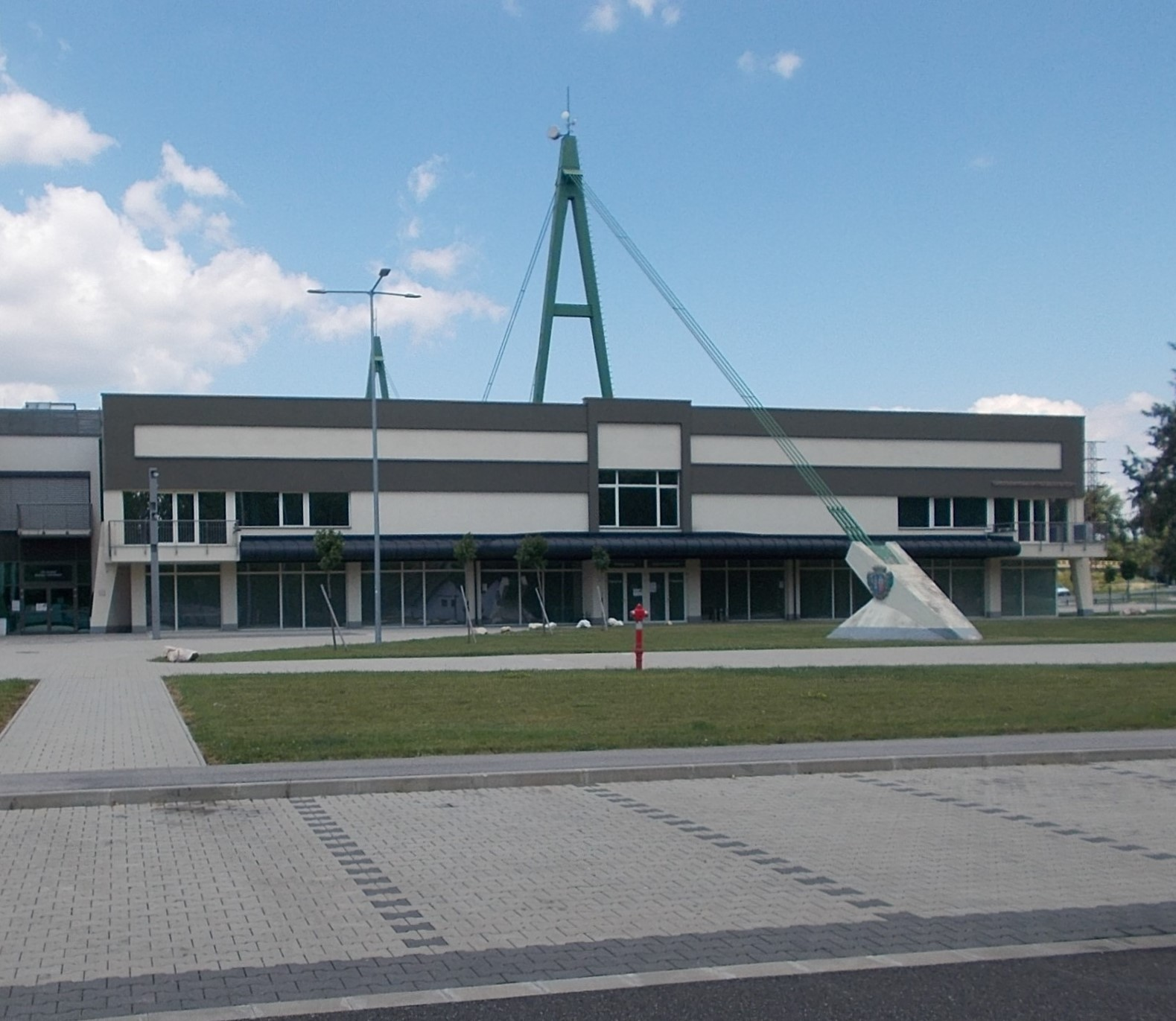
- Interactive map of Magvassy Mihály Sportcsarnok
- Former names: Győri Városi Sportcsarnok
- Location: Győr, Hungary
- Coordinates: 47°41′52.9″N 17°40′3.74″E
- Owner: City of Győr
- Capacity: 2,800 (handball)
- Field size: 46 x 28 m

Construction
- Groundbreaking: 1974
- Opened: 1976
- Renovated: 1995

Tenants
- Győri ETO KC; Győri ETO FKC; Győri ETO Futsal Club; Győr Women Basketball Club; VKLSE Győr

Magvassy Mihály Sportcsarnok is a multi-use indoor arena in Győr, Hungary, named after Mihály Magvassy, a physical education teacher who founded the first sports school in the city in 1856.

== History ==
The idea of building a new indoor arena came up in the late 1960s, when the city had two handball clubs in the top division on the men's side and also the women's team had been set up successfully. The city council approved to invest to the project on 10 April 1970 and the construction began in 1974. It was inaugurated as an exhibition and sports hall in 1976.

In preparation for the 1995 World Women's Handball Championship, that was co-hosted by Austria and Hungary, the arena went through a complete renovation to become a sports hall of the highest standards.

Beside the professional sport events, the arena also hosts a number other programs such as exhibitions, concerts, seminars, balls and fairs.
