= Monika Migała =

Polish handball player (born 1987)

Personal information
- Nationality: Polish
- Born: 1 May 1987 (age 39) Zgierz, Poland
- Height: 1.68 m (5 ft 6 in)

Sport
- Sport: Handball
- Position: Right wing
- Current club: KPR Ruch Chorzów
National team
Years	Team	Apps	(Gls)
–	Poland	42	(73)

Monika Migała (born 1 May 1987) is a Polish handball player. She plays for the club KPR Ruch Chorzów, the Polish national team and represented Poland at the 2013 World Women's Handball Championship in Serbia.
