= Győri ETO KC in European handball =

Győri ETO KC and ETO-SZESE Győr FKC are Hungarian women's and men's handball teams respectively, based in Győr, Hungary. This is their record in European handball.

== Women's team ==
=== European record ===
As of 15 September 2024:

Competition	Seasons	Year(s) in the competition	P	W	D	L	GF	GA	GD
EHF Champions League	22x	2000/01, 2004/05, 2005/06, 2006/07, 2007/08, 2008/09, 2009/10, 2010/11, 2011/12, 2012/13, 2013/14, 2014/15, 2015/16, 2016/17, 2017/18, 2018/19, 2019/20, 2020/21, 2021/22, 2022/23, 2023/24, 2024/25	301	229	21	51	8837	7404	+1,433
EHF Cup (IHF Cup)	4x	1998/99, 2001/02, 2003/04, 2004/05	38	23	1	14	1105	969	+136
EHF Challenge Cup (City Cup)	2x	1995/96, 1996/97	10	7	0	3	280	206	+74
EHF Cup Winners' Cup (defunct)	3x	1999/00, 2002/03, 2005/06	18	10	1	7	513	431	+82
Source: kézitörténelem.hu	29 seasons		367	269	23	75	10,735	9010	+1,725

=== EHF-organised seasonal competitions ===
Győri ETO women's team score listed first. As of 31 December 2025.

=== Record against other teams ===
Record against other teams in EHF organised competitions. Last updated on 31 December 2025.

Record against other teams
Team	Pld	W	D	L	GF	GA	GD
(Austria) Hypo Niederösterreich	8	6	0	2	253	191	+62
(Belarus) Druts Beliniche	2	2	0	0	68	30	+38
(Belgium) Juventus Melveren	2	2	0	0	77	26	+51
(Bosnia and Herzegovina) ŽRK Železničar	4	4	0	0	155	71	+84
(Croatia) RK Podravka Koprivnica	10	10	0	0	335	239	+96
(Croatia) RK Lokomotiva Zagreb	4	4	0	0	117	70	+47
(Czech Republic) DHK Baník Most	2	2	0	0	81	50	+31
(Denmark) Odense Håndbold	13	11	1	1	404	366	+38
(Denmark) Team Esbjerg	11	11	0	0	326	289	+37
(Denmark) Herning-Ikast Håndbold	11	7	1	3	296	264	+32
(Denmark) Viborg HK	8	4	1	3	194	208	-14
(Denmark) Randers HK	4	3	0	1	115	91	+24
(Denmark) Slagelse FH	4	2	0	2	95	98	-3
(Denmark) Nykøbing Falster HK	2	2	0	0	64	47	+17
(Denmark) Frederikshavn fI	2	1	0	1	54	46	+8
(Denmark) GOG Gudme	2	1	0	1	55	51	+4
(Denmark) Aalborg DH	2	1	0	1	60	67	-7
(France) Brest Bretagne Handball	13	7	5	1	360	334	+26
(France) Metz Handball	12	9	0	3	353	318	+35
(France) ESBF Besançon	4	2	0	2	109	113	-4
(Germany) HB Ludwigsburg	9	9	0	0	281	218	+63
(Germany) Handball Club Leipzig	6	5	0	1	177	148	+29
(Germany) Thüringer HC	4	4	0	0	131	97	+34
(Germany) Borussia Dortmund	3	3	0	0	115	79	+36
(Germany) 1. FC Nürnberg	2	2	0	0	66	50	+16
(Germany) Frankfurter HC	2	1	0	1	47	49	-2
(Greece) Anagennisi Arta F.C.	2	1	0	1	58	49	+9
(Hungary) Ferencváros	4	2	2	0	135	105	+30
(Hungary) Debreceni VSC	3	2	0	1	99	82	+17
(Hungary) Alba Fehérvár KC	2	1	0	1	46	49	-3
(Iceland) UMF Stjarnan	1	1	0	0	33	20	+13
(North Macedonia) HC Vardar	6	4	1	1	158	156	+2
(North Macedonia) Kometal Gjorče Petrov Skopje	4	2	0	2	107	101	+6
(Montenegro) ŽRK Budućnost Podgorica	32	24	5	3	873	731	+142
(Norway) Larvik HK	20	13	1	6	522	478	+44
(Norway) Vipers Kristiansand	15	10	0	5	444	379	+65
(Norway) Storhamar HE	4	4	0	0	146	95	+51
(Norway) Gjøvik HK	2	2	0	0	70	61	+9
(Norway) Byåsen HE	2	1	0	1	62	57	+5
(Norway) Bækkelagets SK	2	1	0	1	53	50	+3
(Norway) Glassverket IF	1	1	0	0	30	21	+9
(Poland) MKS Lublin	4	2	0	2	111	107	+4
(Poland) GKS Piotrkovia	2	1	0	1	58	50	+8
(Romania) SCM Râmnicu Vâlcea	18	11	1	6	509	464	+45
(Romania) CSM București	12	9	0	3	328	295	+33
(Romania) HC Zalău	6	3	0	3	154	150	+4
(Romania) HCM Baia Mare	4	4	0	0	116	8	+28
(Romania) CS Rapid București	4	3	0	1	117	105	+12
(Romania) CS Universitatea Cluj-Napoca	2	2	0	0	67	51	+16
(Romania) Gloria Bistrița-Năsăud	1	1	0	0	33	18	+15
(Russia) Zvezda Zvenigorod	8	6	0	2	221	213	+8
(Russia) Rostov-Don	7	5	0	2	179	165	+14
(Russia) CSKA Moscow	5	4	1	0	149	17	+32
(Russia) Dinamo Volgograd	4	4	0	0	108	89	+19
(Russia) Handball Club Lada	4	2	0	2	129	115	+14
(Serbia) ŽRK Radnički Kragujevac	1	1	0	0	42	13	+29
(Slovakia) HK ŠKP Banská Bystrica	2	1	0	1	61	54	+7
(Slovakia) IUVENTA Michalovce	1	1	0	0	42	27	+15
(Slovenia) RK Krim	22	19	3	0	682	529	+153
(Spain) SD Itxako	8	4	2	2	206	195	+11
(Spain) BM Sagunto	4	1	0	3	96	106	-10
(Spain) CB Amadeo Tortajada	2	2	0	0	63	52	+9
(Spain) CBF Elda	2	2	0	0	58	42	+16
(Switzerland) ZMC Amicitia Zürich	2	2	0	0	66	26	+40
(Sweden) IK Sävehof	10	10	0	0	342	228	+114
(Turkey) Kastamonu Bld. GSK	4	4	0	0	158	94	+64
(Ukraine) HC Motor Zaporizhzhia	2	1	0	1	57	58	-1
(Ukraine) HC Spartak Kyiv	2	1	0	1	60	66	-6

==== Women's Champions League ====
Season	Round	Club	Home	Away	Aggregate
2000–01	Second qualifying round	(Poland) MKS Montex Lublin	23-19	22-25	55–54
2000–01	Group stage (Group D)	(Spain) Milar L'Eliana Valencia	23-25	25-29	4th
2000–01	Group stage (Group D)	(Slovenia) RK Krim Neutro Roberts	27-27	21-21	4th
2000–01	Group stage (Group D)	(Ukraine) Spartak Kyiv	32-27	28-39	4th
2004–05	Second qualifying round	(Ukraine) HC Motor Zaporizhzhia	29-27	28-31	57–58; EHF
2005–06	Group stage (Group D)	(Russia) Dinamo Volgograd	25-23	21-19	3rd CWC
2005–06	Group stage (Group D)	(North Macedonia) Kometal GJ. Petrov Skopje	26-28	22-32	3rd CWC
2005–06	Group stage (Group D)	(Denmark) Aalborg DH	31-29	29-38	3rd CWC
2006–07	Group stage (Group B)	(Russia) HC Lada Togliatti	39-28	29-31	2nd
2006–07	Group stage (Group B)	(Montenegro) ŽRK Budućnost	28-20	31-25	2nd
2006–07	Group stage (Group B)	(Norway) Byåsen HB Elite Trondheim	33-27	29-30	2nd
2006–07	Quarter-finals	(Norway) Larvik HK	28-22	27-23	55–45
2006–07	Semi-finals	(Denmark) Slagelse DT	22-30	25-31	47–61
2007–08	Second qualification tournament (Group 1)	(France) HB Metz Moselle Lorraine	30-27		1st
2007–08	Second qualification tournament (Group 1)	(Slovakia) IUVENTA Michalovce	42-27		1st
2007–08	Second qualification tournament (Group 1)	(Iceland) UMF Stjarnan	33-20		1st
2007–08	Group stage (Group A)	(Denmark) Slagelse DT	24-17	24-20	1st
2007–08	Group stage (Group A)	(Spain) Cem. la Unión-Ribarroja	32-24	31-28	1st
2007–08	Group stage (Group A)	(Croatia) RK Podravka Koprivnica	34-29	40-33	1st
2007–08	Main round (Group 1)	(Romania) C.S. Oltchim Rm. Vâlcea	30-27	27-32	1st
2007–08	Main round (Group 1)	(Germany) 1. FC Nürnberg	30-25	36-25	1st
2007–08	Main round (Group 1)	(Russia) HC Lada Togliatti	33-34	28-22	1st
2007–08	Semi-finals	(Russia) Zvezda Zvenigorod	21-27	25-23	46–50
2008–09; Finalist	Group stage (Group A)	(Russia) Zvezda Zvenigorod	29-23	29-28	1st
2008–09; Finalist	Group stage (Group A)	(North Macedonia) Kometal Gjorče Petrov	35-20	24-21	1st
2008–09; Finalist	Group stage (Group A)	(Denmark) Ikast-Brande EH	25-27	27-26	1st
2008–09; Finalist	Main round (Group 2)	(Romania) C.S. Oltchim Rm. Vâlcea	30-28	26-28	1st
2008–09; Finalist	Main round (Group 2)	(Montenegro) Budućnost T-Mobile	31-27	26-26	1st
2008–09; Finalist	Main round (Group 2)	(Slovenia) RK Krim Mercator	34-33	35-31	1st
2008–09; Finalist	Semi-finals	(Austria) Hypo Niederösterreich	29-21	25-26	54–47
2008–09; Finalist	Finals	(Denmark) Viborg HK	23-26	26-24	49–50
2009–10	Group stage (Group C)	(Romania) C.S. Oltchim Rm. Vâlcea	26-22	22-26	2nd
2009–10	Group stage (Group C)	(Spain) S.D. Itxako	29-28	20-14	2nd
2009–10	Group stage (Group C)	(Russia) Zvezda Zvenigorod	27-25	29-34	2nd
2009–10	Main round (Group 1)	(Slovenia) RK Krim Mercator	25-23	24-24	2nd
2009–10	Main round (Group 1)	(Norway) Larvik HK	28-23	27-29	2nd
2009–10	Main round (Group 1)	(Germany) HC Leipzig	30-19	23-21	2nd
2009–10	Semi-finals	(Romania) C.S. Oltchim Rm. Vâlcea	25-25	20-24	45–49
2010–11	Group stage (Group D)	(Slovenia) RK Krim Mercator	26-21	34-30	1st
2010–11	Group stage (Group D)	(Croatia) RK Podravka Koprivnica	27-25	35-24	1st
2010–11	Group stage (Group D)	(Russia) Zvezda Zvenigorod	33-22	28-31	1st
2010–11	Main round (Group 2)	(Norway) Larvik HK	18-24	25-16	1st
2010–11	Main round (Group 2)	(Russia) Dinamo Volgograd	36-23	26-24	1st
2010–11	Main round (Group 2)	(Germany) HC Leipzig	25-20	29-24	1st
2010–11	Semi-finals	(Spain) Itxako Reyno de Navarra	24-24	21-26	45–50
2011–12; Finalist	Group stage (Group C)	(Austria) Hypo Niederösterreich	37-29	27-29	1st
2011–12; Finalist	Group stage (Group C)	(France) Metz Handball	28-23	33-24	1st
2011–12; Finalist	Group stage (Group C)	(Denmark) Randers HK	35-20	23-29	1st
2011–12; Finalist	Main round (Group 1)	(Norway) Larvik HK	31-22	25-32	1st
2011–12; Finalist	Main round (Group 1)	(Denmark) FC Midtjylland	35-27	29-24	1st
2011–12; Finalist	Main round (Group 1)	(Spain) Grupo Asfi Itxako Navarra	25-25	28-26	1st
2011–12; Finalist	Semi-finals	(Romania) C.S. Oltchim Rm. Vâlcea	31-23	31-35	62–58
2011–12; Finalist	Finals	(Montenegro) Budućnost	29-27	25-27	54–54 (a)
2012–13; Winner	Group stage (Group B)	(Slovenia) RK Krim Mercator	29-22	31-20	1st
2012–13; Winner	Group stage (Group B)	(Croatia) RK Podravka Koprivnica	24-19	29-22	1st
2012–13; Winner	Group stage (Group B)	(Romania) U Jolidon Cluj	37-26	30-25	1st
2012–13; Winner	Main round (Group 1)	(Norway) Larvik HK	30-24	24-18	1st
2012–13; Winner	Main round (Group 1)	(Denmark) Randers HK	32-24	25-18	1st
2012–13; Winner	Main round (Group 1)	(Montenegro) Budućnost	27-17	22-21	1st
2012–13; Winner	Semi-finals	(Romania) Oltchim Rm. Vâlcea	24-25	24-22	48–47
2012–13; Winner	Finals	(Norway) Larvik HK	23-22	24-21	47–43
2013–14; Winner	Group stage (Group A)	(Germany) Thüringer HC	29-22	33-25	1st
2013–14; Winner	Group stage (Group A)	(Austria) Hypo Niederösterreich	41-22	28-27	1st
2013–14; Winner	Group stage (Group A)	(Romania) HCM Baia Mare	28-26	33-21	1st
2013–14; Winner	Main round (Group 2)	(Slovenia) RK Krim Mercator	27-24	24-22	1st
2013–14; Winner	Main round (Group 2)	(Montenegro) Budućnost	23-23	26-26	1st
2013–14; Winner	Main round (Group 2)	(Norway) Larvik HK	31-29	29-23	1st
2013–14; Winner	Semi-final (F4)	(Denmark) FC Midtjylland	29–26		
2013–14; Winner	Final (F4)	(Montenegro) Budućnost	27–21		
2014–15	Group stage (Group C)	(Denmark) Viborg HK A/S	22-20	30-25	1st
2014–15	Group stage (Group C)	(Croatia) RK Lokomotiva Zagreb	32-23	26-15	1st
2014–15	Group stage (Group C)	(Sweden) IK Sävehof	35-23	38-21	1st
2014–15	Main round (Group 2)	(Norway) Larvik HK	25-26	19-21	2nd
2014–15	Main round (Group 2)	(France) Metz Handball	31-27	27-20	2nd
2014–15	Main round (Group 2)	(Romania) HCM Baia Mare	29-23	26-18	2nd
2014–15	Quarter-finals	(North Macedonia) ŽRK Vardar SCBT	27-27	18-24	45–51
2015–16; Finalist	Qualification tournament (Group 2)	(Serbia) ŽRK Radnički Kragujevac	42-13		1st
2015–16; Finalist	Qualification tournament (Group 2)	(Norway) Glassverket	30-21		1st
2015–16; Finalist	Group stage (Group C)	(Denmark) FC Midtjylland	21-26	22-22	1st
2015–16; Finalist	Group stage (Group C)	(North Macedonia) ŽRK Vardar	28-27	27-22	1st
2015–16; Finalist	Group stage (Group C)	(Austria) Hypo Niederösterreich	37-16	29-21	1st
2015–16; Finalist	Main round (Group 2)	(Montenegro) Budućnost	22-20	22-25	2nd
2015–16; Finalist	Main round (Group 2)	(Romania) CSM București	28-22	24-22	2nd
2015–16; Finalist	Main round (Group 2)	(Sweden) IK Sävehof	32-26	26-18	2nd
2015–16; Finalist	Quarter-finals	(Hungary) FTC-Rail Cargo Hungária	40-23	31-18	71–41
2015–16; Finalist	Semi-final (F4)	(Montenegro) Budućnost	21–20		
2015–16; Finalist	Final (F4)	(Romania) CSM București	25–25 (1-4 p)		
2016–17; Winner	Group stage (Group C)	(Romania) CSM București	33-25	27-24	1st
2016–17; Winner	Group stage (Group C)	(Denmark) FC Midtjylland	31-19	23-27	1st
2016–17; Winner	Group stage (Group C)	(Russia) Rostov-Don	32-25	28-27	1st
2016–17; Winner	Main round (Group 2)	(Slovenia) RK Krim Mercator	39-22	34-17	1st
2016–17; Winner	Main round (Group 2)	(Norway) Larvik	27-27	26-25	1st
2016–17; Winner	Main round (Group 2)	(Denmark) Team Esbjerg	33-22	32-26	1st
2016–17; Winner	Quarter-finals	(France) Metz Handball	28-22	31-32	59–54
2016–17; Winner	Semi-final (F4)	(Montenegro) Budućnost	26–20		
2016–17; Winner	Final (F4)	(North Macedonia) ŽRK Vardar	31–30 (a.e.t.)		
2017–18; Winner	Group stage (Group B)	(Russia) Rostov-Don	25-23	22-23	1st
2017–18; Winner	Group stage (Group B)	(Denmark) FC Midtjylland	27-16	27-24	1st
2017–18; Winner	Group stage (Group B)	(France) Brest Bretagne Handball	26-17	26-23	1st
2017–18; Winner	Main round (Group 2)	(Romania) CSM București	28-24	22-28	1st
2017–18; Winner	Main round (Group 2)	(Denmark) Nykøbing Falster H.	32-23	32-24	1st
2017–18; Winner	Main round (Group 2)	(Slovenia) RK Krim Mercator	34-25	32-21	1st
2017–18; Winner	Quarter-finals	(Montenegro) Budućnost	30-28	26-20	56–48
2017–18; Winner	Semi-final (F4)	(Romania) CSM București	26–20		
2017–18; Winner	Final (F4)	(North Macedonia) ŽRK Vardar	27–26 (a.e.t.)		
2018–19; Winner	Group stage (Group C)	(Germany) Thüringer HC	31-28	38-22	1st
2018–19; Winner	Group stage (Group C)	(Slovenia) RK Krim Mercator	39-23	32-23	1st
2018–19; Winner	Group stage (Group C)	(Croatia) RK Podravka Koprivnica	37-17	33-27	1st
2018–19; Winner	Main round (Group 2)	(Romania) CSM București	36-27	27-25	1st
2018–19; Winner	Main round (Group 2)	(Norway) Vipers Kristiansand	33-29	33-26	1st
2018–19; Winner	Main round (Group 2)	(Hungary) FTC-Rail Cargo Hungaria	32-32	32-32	1st
2018–19; Winner	Quarter-finals	(Denmark) Odense Håndbold	33-21	29-28	62–49
2018–19; Winner	Semi-final (F4)	(Norway) Vipers Kristiansand	31–22		
2018–19; Winner	Final (F4)	(Russia) Rostov-Don	25–24		
2019–20	Group stage (Group D)	(Slovenia) RK Krim Mercator	31-26	33-21	1st
2019–20	Group stage (Group D)	(Sweden) IK Sävehof	35-23	36-27	1st
2019–20	Group stage (Group D)	(Czech Republic) DHK Baník Most	35-29	46-21	1st
2019–20	Main round (Group 2)	(France) Brest Bretagne HB	27-27	29-28	1st
2019–20	Main round (Group 2)	(Montenegro) Budućnost	26-24	28-27	1st
2019–20	Main round (Group 2)	(Romania) SCM Râmnicu Vâlcea	35–29	29-20	1st
2019–20	Quarter-finals	(Romania) CSM București	Cancelled		
2020–21; Bronze	Group stage (Group B)	(Romania) SCM Râmnicu Vâlcea	38-31	37-20	1st
2020–21; Bronze	Group stage (Group B)	(Montenegro) ŽRK Budućnost	34-29	26-21	1st
2020–21; Bronze	Group stage (Group B)	(Germany) Borussia Dortmund	38-25	34-24	1st
2020–21; Bronze	Group stage (Group B)	(Russia) HBC CSKA Moscow	31-24	27-27	1st
2020–21; Bronze	Group stage (Group B)	(France) Brest Bretagne	27–27	25-25	1st
2020–21; Bronze	Group stage (Group B)	(Denmark) Odense Håndbold	32-25	32-32	1st
2020–21; Bronze	Group stage (Group B)	(Croatia) RK Podravka Koprivnica	43-28	33-15	1st
2020–21; Bronze	Round of 16	(Germany) SG BBM Bietigheim	32-28	37-20	69–48
2020–21; Bronze	Quarter-finals	(Montenegro) ŽRK Budućnost	30–19	24–21	54–40
2020–21; Bronze	Semi-final (F4)	(France) Brest Bretagne	23–23 (2-4 p)		
2020–21; Bronze	Bronze-match (F4)	(Russia) HBC CSKA Moscow	32–21		
2021–22; Finalist	Group stage (Group B)	(Russia) CSKA Moscow	32-22	27-23	1st
2021–22; Finalist	Group stage (Group B)	(Norway) Vipers Kristiansand	35-29	29-30	1st
2021–22; Finalist	Group stage (Group B)	(Slovenia) RK Krim Mercator	40-27	31-26	1st
2021–22; Finalist	Group stage (Group B)	(Denmark) Odense Håndbold	27-26	31-26	1st
2021–22; Finalist	Group stage (Group B)	(France) Metz Handball	39-30	33-29	1st
2021–22; Finalist	Group stage (Group B)	(Turkey) Kastamonu Bld. GSK	37-20	38-22	1st
2021–22; Finalist	Group stage (Group B)	(Sweden) IK Sävehof	41-19	31-25	1st
2021–22; Finalist	Quarter-finals	(France) Brest Bretagne Handball	35-23	21–21	56–44
2021–22; Finalist	Semi-final (F4)	(Denmark) Team Esbjerg	32–27		
2021–22; Finalist	Final (F4)	(Norway) Vipers Kristiansand	31–33		
2022–23; Bronze	Group stage Group B	(Denmark) Team Esbjerg	29-28	31-29	2nd
2022–23; Bronze	Group stage Group B	(France) Metz Handball	24-28	28–29	2nd
2022–23; Bronze	Group stage Group B	(Romania) CS Rapid București	32-30	27-30	2nd
2022–23; Bronze	Group stage Group B	(Montenegro) ŽRK Budućnost Podgorica	32-19	25-23	2nd
2022–23; Bronze	Group stage Group B	(Norway) Storhamar HE	39-26	35-21	2nd
2022–23; Bronze	Group stage Group B	(Turkey) Kastamonu Bld. GSK	44-25	39-27	2nd
2022–23; Bronze	Group stage Group B	(Croatia) RK Lokomotiva Zagreb	32-16	27-16	2nd
2022–23; Bronze	Quarter-finals	(Denmark) Odense Håndbold	37–28	29-27	66–55
2022–23; Bronze	Semi-final (F4)	(Norway) Vipers Kristiansand	35–37		
2022–23; Bronze	Bronze-match (F4)	(Denmark) Team Esbjerg	28–27		
2023–24; Winner	Group stage Group A	(Romania) CSM București	24–26	27–23	1st
2023–24; Winner	Group stage Group A	(Sweden) IK Sävehof	39–20	29–26	1st
2023–24; Winner	Group stage Group A	(Denmark) Odense Håndbold	32–29	31-30	1st
2023–24; Winner	Group stage Group A	(France) Brest Bretagne Handball	32–32	24–23	1st
2023–24; Winner	Group stage Group A	(Montenegro) ŽRK Budućnost Podgorica	37–19	29–21	1st
2023–24; Winner	Group stage Group A	(Germany) SG BBM Bietigheim	31–29	34–26	1st
2023–24; Winner	Group stage Group A	(Hungary) DVSC Schaeffler	35–23	28–29	1st
2023–24; Winner	Quarter-finals	(Norway) Vipers Kristiansand	24–26	30–23	54–49
2023–24; Winner	Semi-final	(Denmark) Team Esbjerg	24–23		
2023–24; Winner	Final	(Germany) SG BBM Bietigheim	30–24		
2024–25; Winner	Group B	(Denmark) Team Esbjerg	28–26	29–23	1st
2024–25; Winner	Group B	(Montenegro) ŽRK Budućnost Podgorica	33–21	23–23	1st
2024–25; Winner	Group B	(Germany) HB Ludwigsburg	32–19	31–26	1st
2024–25; Winner	Group B	(Norway) Vipers Kristiansand	27–22	10–0	1st
2024–25; Winner	Group B	(France) Brest Bretagne Handball	28–27	35–34	1st
2024–25; Winner	Group B	(Romania) CS Rapid București	31–20	28–25	1st
2024–25; Winner	Group B	(Denmark) Odense Håndbold	28–35	34–32	1st
2024–25; Winner	Quarter-finals	(Germany) HB Ludwigsburg	29–22	25–24	54–46
2024–25; Winner	Semi-final	(Denmark) Team Esbjerg	29–28		
2024–25; Winner	Final	(Denmark) Odense Håndbold	29–27		
2025–26; Runner-up	Group A	(France) Metz Handball	31–27	27–24	1st
2025–26; Runner-up	Group A	(Norway) Storhamar HE	40–23	32–25	1st
2025–26; Runner-up	Group A	(Romania) Gloria Bistrița-Năsăud	33–18	27–22	1st
2025–26; Runner-up	Group A	(Denmark) Team Esbjerg	31–30	28–33	1st
2025–26; Runner-up	Group A	(Germany) Borussia Dortmund	39–28	43–30	1st
2025–26; Runner-up	Group A	(Montenegro) OTP Group Budućnost	34–22	36–20	1st
2025–26; Runner-up	Group A	(Hungary) DVSC Schaeffler	30–31	36–30	1st
2025–26; Runner-up	Quarter-finals	(Denmark) Odense Håndbold	36–28	40–25	76–53
2025–26; Runner-up	Semi-final	(France) Brest Bretagne Handball	31–30		
2025–26; Runner-up	Final	(France) Metz Handball	29–31		

==== Women's EHF Cup ====
Season	Round	Club	Home	Away	Aggregate
1998–99; Finalist	Round of 16	(Belgium) Juventus Melveren	36-10	41-16	77–26
1998–99; Finalist	Quarter-finals	(Spain) CB Elda Prestigio	29-19	29-21	58–42
1998–99; Finalist	Semi-finals	(Poland) GKS Piotrkovia	30-21	28-29	58–50
1998–99; Finalist	Finals	(Denmark) Viborg HK	24-21	21-28	45–49
2001–02; Finalist	Third round	(Denmark) Fox Team Nord Frederikshavn	34-22	20-24	54–46
2001–02; Finalist	Fourth round	(Greece) GAS Anagennisi Artas	33-21	25-28	58–49
2001–02; Finalist	Quarter-finals	(Norway) Gjøvik og Vardal HK	38-24	32-37	70–61
2001–02; Finalist	Semi-finals	(Norway) Bækkelagets SK	31-23	22-27	53–50
2001–02; Finalist	Finals	(Denmark) Ikast Bording EH	30-25	23-36	53–61
2003–04; Finalist	Third round	(Romania) CS Oltchim Vâlcea	29-26	25-21	54–47
2003–04; Finalist	Round of 16	(Spain) S.D. Itxako Estella	33-22	26-30	59–52
2003–04; Finalist	Quarter-finals	(Denmark) GOG Gudme	29-23	26-28	55–51
2003–04; Finalist	Semi-finals	(Norway) Våg HK	29-20	26-29	55–49
2003–04; Finalist	Finals	(Denmark) Viborg HK A/S	27-27	21-37	48–64
2004–05; Finalist	Third round	(Poland) SPR Lublin	33-25	23-28	56–53
2004–05; Finalist	Round of 16	(Norway) Våg Vipers HK	33-25	38-28	71–53
2004–05; Finalist	Quarter-finals	(Romania) C.S. Silcotub Zalău	35-22	30-31	65–53
2004–05; Finalist	Semi-finals	(Germany) HC Leipzig	43-31	27-33	70–64
2004–05; Finalist	Finals	(Hungary) Cornexi Alcoa	27-21	19-28	46–49

==== Women's City Cup (Challenge Cup) ====
Season	Round	Club	Home	Away	Aggregate
1995–96	Round of 16	(Switzerland) ZMC Amicitia Zürich	33-13	33-13	66–26
1995–96	Quarter-finals	(Romania) Silcotub Zalău	21-18	17-29	38–47
1996–97	Round of 32	(Belarus) Druts Beliniche	36-12	32-18	68–30
1996–97	Round of 16	(Slovakia) ZVT Banská Bystrica	33-26	28-29	61–54
1996–97	Quarter-finals	(Germany) Frankfurter HC	29-23	18-26	47–49

==== Women's Cup Winners' Cup ====
From the 2016–17 season, the women's competition was merged with the EHF Cup.

Season	Round	Club	Home	Away	Aggregate
1999–00	Round of 32	(Bosnia and Herzegovina) Željezničar Hadžići	48-12	33-13	81–25
1999–00	Round of 16	(Spain) Milar L'Eliana Valencia	27-23	21-29	48–52
2002–03	Third round	(Bosnia and Herzegovina) ŽRK Željezničar-Sarabon	41-26	33-25	74–46
2002–03	Fourth round	(Russia) Rostov-Don	25-17	22-26	47–43
2002–03	Quarter-finals	(Romania) A.S. Silcotub Zalău	29-26	22-24	51–50
2002–03	Semi-finals	(France) E.S.B.F. Besançon	27-26	18-30	45–56
2005–06; Finalist	Quarter-finals	(France) E.S.B.F. Besançon	34-24	30-33	64–57
2005–06; Finalist	Semi-finals	(Norway) Larvik HK	33-28	22-23	55–51
2005–06; Finalist	Finals	(Serbia and Montenegro) ŽRK Budućnost MONET	23-26	25-25	48–51

== Men's team ==
=== EHF-organised seasonal competitions ===
Győri ETO men's team score listed first. As of 13 September 2018

==== European Cup ====
Season	Round	Club	Home	Away	Aggregate
1988–89	First round	(Netherlands) Blauw-Wit Neerbeek	26-12	26-23	52–35
1988–89	Second round	(Sweden) HK Drott	23-22	18-23	41–45
1989–90	First round	(Greece) Filippos Veria	33-15	23-23	56–38
1989–90	Second round	(Iceland) Valur	29-23	31-21	60–44
1989–90	Quarter-finals	(Soviet Union) SKA Minsk	21-29	22-31	43–60
1990–91	First round	(Romania) Steaua București	21-20	21-26	42–46

==== EHF Cup ====
Season	Round	Club	Home	Away	Aggregate
1985–86; Winner	First round	(Turkey) Simtel Sport Club	31-17	22-17	53–34
1985–86; Winner	Round of 16	(Switzerland) RTV Basel	28-18	28-25	56–43
1985–86; Winner	Quarter-finals	(Czechoslovakia) Tatran Prešov	23-18	21-24	44–42
1985–86; Winner	Semi-finals	(Socialist Federal Republic of Yugoslavia) Proleter Nafta-Gas Zrenjanin	30-19	22-25	45–44
1985–86; Winner	Finals	(Spain) Tecnisa Alicante	23-17	20-24	43–41
2003–04	First round	(Lithuania) Lusis Akademikas Kaunas	29-23	25-18	54–41
2003–04	Round of 16	(Belarus) Meshkov Brest	27-22	26-32	53–54

==== City Cup (Challenge Cup) ====
Season	Round	Club	Home	Away	Aggregate
1993–94	Quarter-finals	(Portugal) S.L. Benfica	21-24	17-19	38–44
1996–97	Round of 32	(Norway) Drammen HK	27-25	15-17	42–42 (a)

==== Cup Winners' Cup ====
From the 2012–13 season, the men's competition was merged with the EHF Cup.

Season	Round	Club	Home	Away	Aggregate
1986–87	Round of 16	(Israel) Hapoel Ramat Gan	19-18	32-25	51–43
1986–87	Quarter-finals	(West Germany) MTSV Schwabing	23-17	15-21	38–38 (a)
1987–88	Round of 16	(Spain) Atlético Madrid	24-15	13-24	37–39
1992–93	Preliminary round	(Romania) Minaur Baia Mare	25-20	19-24	44–44 (a)
1995–96	Round of 32	(Federal Republic of Yugoslavia) Crvena zvezda	30-27	25-34	55–61
