= 2004–05 EHF Women's Cup Winners' Cup =

The 2004–05 EHF Women's Cup Winners' Cup was the 29th edition of EHF's competition for women's handball national cup champions. It ran from October 8, 2004 to May 21, 2005.

1996 EHF Cup runner-up Larvik HK defeated 1996 Champions League champion Podravka Koprivnica to win its first European trophy. It was the third Cup Winners' Cup that went to Norway, after Bækkelagets SK's two titles in the late 1990s.

== Results ==
First preliminary round. October 8–17, 2004

Local team	Aggregate	Away team	1st leg	2nd leg
SPES Kevalovrysos (Cyprus)	36–82	(Russia) Kuban Krasnodar	17–44	19–38
ABU Baku (Azerbaijan)	48–67	(Germany) 1.FC Nürnberg	23–32	25–35
Tutunski K. Prilep (North Macedonia)	w/o	(Italy) DeGasperi Enna
Váci NKSE (Hungary)	62–41	(Bosnia and Herzegovina) Borac Banja Luka	30–18	32–23
McDonald's Wiener Neustadt (Austria)	44–43	(Slovenia) Celeia Zalec	26–24	18–19
Podravka Koprivnica (Croatia)	59–43	(Sweden) Team Eslöv	28–18	31–25
Baracuda Chisinau (Moldova)	38–104	(Spain) La Unión Tortajada	18–53	20–51
Havelsan Ankara (Turkey)	75–52	(Switzerland) LC Brühl	40–29	35–23
Ormi Patras (Greece)	46–46	(Ukraine) Spartak Kyiv (a)	30–25	16–21
SKP Banská Bystrica (Slovakia)	50–46	(Serbia and Montenegro) ŽRK Kikinda	29–24	21–22
Rapid Bucharest (Romania)	88–63	(Belarus) SHK Gorodnichanka	42–32	46–31
FC Copenhague (Denmark)	79–27	(Portugal) CD Gil Eanes	41–14	38–13
VeL Geleen (Netherlands)	37–63	(Poland) Zgoda Ruda Śląska	20–30	17–33
Larvik HK (Norway)	97–24	(Bulgaria) Etar Veliko Tarnovo	47–11	50–13

Second preliminary round January 7–16, 2005
(Russia) Kuban Krasnodar	22	29	51
(Germany) 1.FC Nürnberg	27	32	59
(North Macedonia) Tutunski K. Prilep	18	19	37
(Hungary) Váci NKSE	32	37	69
(Austria) McDonald's W. Neustadt	24	19	43
(Denmark) Aarhus GF	29	34	63
(Croatia) Podravka Koprivnica	37	37	74
(Spain) La Unión Tortajada	22	27	49
(Turkey) Havelsan Ankara	46	25	71
(Ukraine) Spartak Kyiv	37	33	70
(Slovakia) SKP Banská Bystrica	28	23	51
(Romania) Rapid Bucharest	31	28	59
(Denmark) FC Copenhague	34	33	67
(Poland) Zgoda Ruda Śląska	19	21	40
(Norway) Larvik HK	26	30	56
(France) ES Besançon	23	22	45

Third preliminary round February 12–20, 2005
(Germany) 1.FC Nürnberg	32	26	58
(Hungary) Váci NKSE	25	19	44
(Denmark) Aarhus GF	27	17	44
(Croatia) Podravka Koprivnica	27	29	56
(Turkey) Havelsan Ankara	38	41	79
(Romania) Rapid Bucharest	37	44	81
(Denmark) FC Copenhague	26	24	50
(Norway) Larvik HK	32	29	61

Quarterfinals; March 12–20, 2005
(Germany) 1.FC Nürnberg	38	22	60
(Russia) Lada Togliatti	29	28	57
(Croatia) Podravka Koprivnica	39	29	68
(Spain) Mar Valencia	30	32	62
(Norway) Tertnes HE	40	22	62
(Romania) Rapid Bucharest	24	28	52
(Russia) Dynamo Volgograd	28	29	57
(Norway) Larvik HK	27	36	63

Semifinals; April 9–16, 2005
(Germany) 1.FC Nürnberg	31	27	58
(Croatia) Podravka Koprivnica	31	37	68
(Norway) Tertnes HE	24	20	44
(Norway) Larvik HK	32	31	63

Final; May 14–21, 2005
(Croatia) Podravka Koprivnica	26	27	53
(Norway) Larvik HK	31	37	68
