= 1963–64 Women's European Cup (handball) =

1963–64 Women's Handball European Cup
Tournament details
- Dates: 30 November 1963 – 4 April 1964
- Teams: 10 (Qualifying stage); 8 (knockout stage)

Final positions
- Champions: (Romania) Rapid Bucharest
- Runners-up: (Denmark) Helsingør

Tournament statistics
- Matches played: 23

The 1963–64 Women's Handball European Champions Cup was the fourth edition of the premier international competition for European women's handball clubs, taking place from November 1963 to April 1964. Thirteen teams took part in the competition, with 1963 finalists Soviet Union and Denmark and debutante Norway being granted byes to the quarterfinals. The final was carried out as a single match taking place in Bratislava on April 4.

Rapid Bucharest won the competition beating Helsingør IF in a tight final, becoming the second and last to date Romanian team to win the competition. Defending champion Trud Moscow was ousted in the quarterfinals by Budapesti Spartacus.

== First round ==
Team #1	Agg.	Team #2	1st match	2nd match
Fortschritt Weissenfels (East Germany)	14 – 17	(Poland) Ruch Chorzów	12 – 6	5 – 7
Rapid Bucharest (Romania)	19 – 13	(Socialist Federal Republic of Yugoslavia) Spartak Subotica	13 – 5	6 – 8
Admira Wien (Austria)	14 – 37	(Hungary) Budapesti Spartacus	7 – 14	7 – 23
Trud Moscow (Soviet Union)	Bye			
Helsingør (Denmark)	Bye			
Skogen (Norway)	Bye			
Ivry (France)	8 – 31	(Netherlands) Swift Roermond	6 – 16	2 – 15
Eimsbütteler (Germany)	14 – 12	(Czechoslovakia) ČKD Prague	11 – 4	3 – 8

== Quarter-finals ==
Team #1	Agg.	Team #2	1st match	2nd match
Fortschritt Weissenfels (East Germany)	14 – 17	(Romania) Rapid Bucharest	10 – 9	4 – 8
Budapesti Spartacus (Hungary)	24 – 19	(Soviet Union) Trud Moscow	16 – 7	8 – 12
Helsingør (Denmark)	25 – 22	(Norway) Skogen	14 – 13	11 – 9
Swift Roermond (Netherlands)	11 – 13	(Germany) Eimsbütteler	4 – 5	7 – 8

== Semifinals ==
Team #1	Agg.	Team #2	1st match	2nd match
Rapid Bucharest (Romania)	24 – 12	(Hungary) Budapesti Spartacus	13 – 5	11 – 7
Helsingør (Denmark)	14 – 9	(Germany) Eimsbütteler	6 – 7	8 – 2

== Final ==
Date	Team #1	Result	Team #2
04.04.1964	Rapid Bucharest (Romania)	14 –13	(Denmark) Helsingør

Women's Handball European Cup
1963–64 Winner

(Romania) Rapid Bucharest
First title
