= Marta López =

Spanish handball player (born 1990)

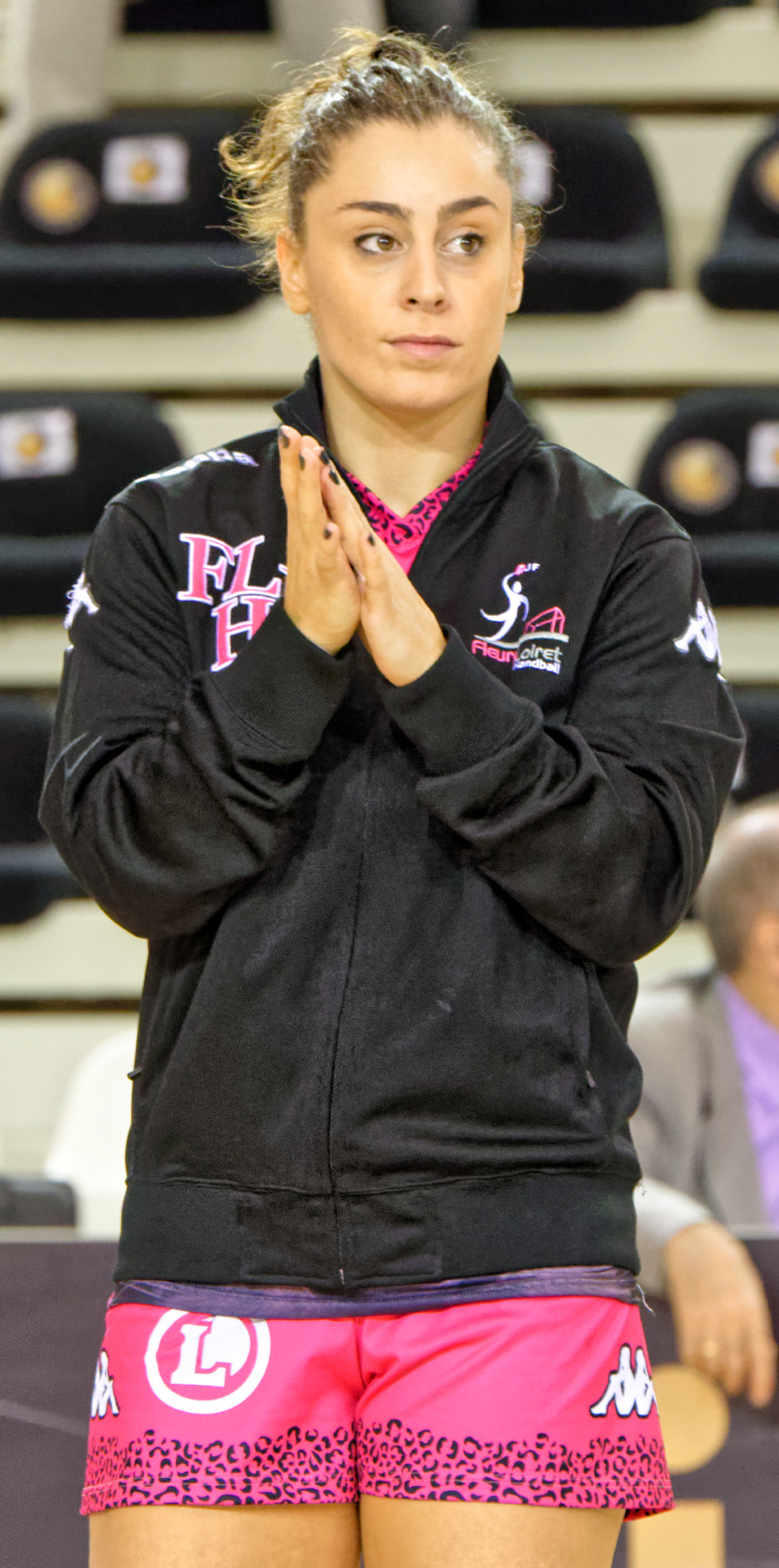
- López in 2015

Personal information
- Full name: Marta López Herrero
- Nationality: Spanish
- Born: 4 February 1990 (age 36) Málaga, Spain
- Height: 1.65 m (5 ft 5 in)

Sport
- Sport: Handball
- Position: Right wing
- Current club: CS Rapid
- Number: 17

Senior clubs
- Years: Team
- 2008–2012: BM Alcobendas
- 2012–2016: Fleury Loiret HB
- 2016–2017: BM Bera Bera
- 2017–2021: SCM Râmnicu Vâlcea
- 2021–2024: CS Rapid București
- 2024–2025: CBF Málaga
- 2025–: Saint-Amand Handball
National team
Years	Team	Apps	(Gls)
2009–2024	Spain	151	(348)
Medal record
Olympic Games
Bronze medal – third place	2012 London	Team
World Championship
Silver medal – second place	2019 Japan
European Championship
Silver medal – second place	2014 Croatia/Hungary
- Updated on 26 November 2024

Marta López Herrero (born 4 February 1990) is a Spanish female handball player for French club Saint-Amand Handball and formerly the Spanish national team.

López was voted Best Right Wing of the 2007 European Junior Championships and of the Ligue Feminine de Handball D1 in France in the 2012–13 and 2013–14 seasons.

== International honours ==
- EHF Cup Winners' Cup:
  - Finalist: 2015
- European Championship:
  - Silver Medalist: 2014
- Olympic Games:
  - Bronze Medalist: 2012

== Individual awards ==
- French Championship Best Right Wing: 2013, 2014
