= CS Rapid București (handball) =

Romanian women's handball team

- Full name: Clubul Sportiv Rapid București
- Short name: Rapid
- Founded: 1934; 92 years ago
- Arena: Sala Rapid (domestic matches); Sala Polivalentă (international matches)
- Capacity: 1,500; 5,300
- President: Bogdan Vasiliu
- Head coach: Dragan Adžić
- League: Liga Națională
- 2025-26: Liga Naţională, 7th of 12
- Club colours
Home	Away

CS Rapid București is a Romanian professional handball club based in Giulești, in the northwestern parts of Bucharest. Founded in 1934, they play their home games at the Sala Rapid. The club competes in the Liga Națională, the top division of Romanian handball. They won their first major honour, the League championship, in 1961. The club won the Romanian Cup for the first time in 2004, and their first European honour, the European Cup, in 1964.

Rapid achieved the EHF treble. Domestically, the club has won six league titles and one Romanian Cup. Internationally, they have won one Champions League, one European League, and one European Cup since their inception.

== Honours ==
=== National competitions ===
==== League titles ====
- Liga Națională

Winners (6): 1961, 1962, 1963, 1967, 2003, 2022

==== Cups ====
- Cupa României

Winners (1): 2004

=== European competitions ===
- Champions League

Winners (1): 1964

- European League

Winners (1): 1993

- European Cup

Winners (1): 2000

== Players ==
=== Current squad ===
Squad for the 2026–27 season

Goalkeepers

- 1 (France) Laura Glauser
- 12 (Romania) Diana Ciucă
- 36 (Montenegro) Mia Vuksanović

Left Wings

- 20 (Hungary) Dorina Korsós (c)
- 21 (Norway) Mina Hesselberg
- 98 (Montenegro) Mela Mehmedović

Right Wings

- 3 (Romania) Denisa Stoichită
- 55 (Romania) Oana Borş
- 91 (North Macedonia) Sara Ristovska

Line Players

- 10 (Angola) Albertina Kassoma (pregnant)
- 14 (Germany) Marie Steffen
- 25 (Netherlands) Pipy Wolfs
- 88 (Russia) Viktoriya Shamanovskaya

Left Backs

- 22 (France) Orlane Kanor
- 29 (Romania) Maryia Skrobić
- 71 (Montenegro) Martina Knežević

Centre Backs

- 11 (Norway) Julie Hulleberg
- 13 (France) Djazz Chambertin
- 97 (Romania) Maria Soroceanu

Right Backs

- 5 (Austria) Klara Schlegel (injured)
- 6 (France) Océane Sercien-Ugolin
- 24 (Montenegro) Tanja Ivanović

Squad information
No.	Nat.	Player	Position	In	Contract until
1	(Romania)	Anastasia Roşu	Goalkeeper	2025	
2	(Portugal)	Mariana Lopes	Centre back	2025	
7	(Romania)	Eliza Buceschi	Centre back	2020	2025
9	(Romania)	Rebecca Geamănu	Line Player	2025	
10	(Angola)	Albertina Kassoma	Line Player	2023	2025
12	(Romania)	Diana Ciucă	Goalkeeper	2021	2025
16	(Romania)	Denisa Șandru	Goalkeeper	2021	2026
18	(Romania)	Gabriela Tulea	Right wing	2025	
19	(France)	Aïssatou Kouyaté	Right back	2024	
20	(Hungary)	Dorina Korsós	Left wing	2022	2025
21	(Norway)	Mina Hesselberg	Left wing	2025	
23	(Norway)	Line Ellertsen	Right back	2025	
24	(Romania)	Janine Carașol	Left wing	2025	
26	(Angola)	Stelvia Pascoal	Left back	2025	
28	(Hungary)	Alexandra Töpfner	Right wing	2025	
29	(Romania)	Maria Kanaval	Left back	2025	
31	(France)	Djazz Chambertin	Left back	2025	
79	(Netherlands)	Estavana Polman	Centre back	2022	2025
83	(Serbia)	Marija Petrović	Line player	2025	
88	(Russia)	Viktoriya Shamanovskaya	Line Player	2025	
91	(North Macedonia)	Sara Ristovska	Right wing	2024	

=== Transfers ===
Transfers for the season 2027–28

Joining

- (Austria) Katarina Pandza (LB) (from (Croatia) RK Podravka Koprivnica)

Leaving

== Selected former players ==
- (Romania) Alina Dobrin
- (Romania) Cristina Vărzaru
- (Romania) Aurelia Brădeanu
- (Romania) Paula Ungureanu
- (Romania) Oana Manea
- (Romania) Gabriela Perianu
- (Romania) Lorena Ostase
- (Romania) Alexandra Badea
- (Romania) Nicoleta Dincă
- (Romania) Alina Iordache
- (Spain) Jennifer Gutiérrez Bermejo
- (Spain) Irene Espínola
- (Spain) Lara González Ortega
- (Spain) Ainhoa Hernández
- (Spain) Alicia Fernández
- (Spain) Marta López
- (France) Orlane Kanor
- (France) Julie Foggea
- (France) Alexandra Lacrabère
- (France) Laura Kanor
- (Serbia) Anđela Janjušević
- (Angola) Azenaide Carlos
- (Croatia) Ivana Kapitanovic
- (Russia) Polina Gorshkova
- (Netherlands) Rinka Duijndam
- (Denmark) Mathilde Neesgaard
- (Norway) Line Ellertsen Heldal

== Top scorers in the EHF Champions League ==
(All-Time) – Last updated on 30 March 2025

Rank	Name	Seasons played	Goals
1	(Hungary) Dorina Korsós	3	139
2	(Serbia) Anđela Janjušević	3	126
3	(Romania) Sorina Grozav	3	120
4	(Angola) Albertina Kassoma	3	106
5	(Netherlands) Estavana Polman	3	103
6	(Romania) Eliza Buceschi	3	102
7	(France) Orlane Kanor	2	100
8	(Spain) Marta López	3	80
9	(Spain) Alicia Fernández	3	69
10	(Romania) Lorena Ostase	3	55

== In European competitions ==
EHF competitions
Season	Competition	Pld	W	D	L	GF	GA	Diff	Final result
1961–62	European Champions Cup	4	2	1	1	30	27	+3	Quarter-finals
1962–63	European Champions Cup	6	4	1	1	52	36	+16	Semi-finals
1963–64	European Champions Cup	7	6	0	1	76	50	+26	Winners
1967–68	European Champions Cup	6	4	0	2	98	67	+31	Semi-finals
1992–93	IHF Cup	10	7	0	3	251	209	+42	Winners
1993–94	EHF Cup	2	1	0	1	43	48	-5	Round of 16
1995–96	EHF Cup	4	2	0	2	89	89	0	Quarter-finals
1996–97	City Cup	4	1	1	2	86	93	-7	Quarter-finals
1999–2000	City Cup	8	7	1	0	255	189	+66	Winners
1999–2000	Champions Trophy	2	0	0	2	44	62	-18	Fourth place
2000–01	Cup Winners' Cup	2	0	0	2	39	57	-18	Round 4
2001–02	Challenge Cup	8	5	0	3	225	173	+52	Semi-finals
2002–03	EHF Cup	6	5	0	1	209	148	+61	Round 4
2003–04	EHF Champions League	4	2	1	1	113	107	+6	Qualification Round 2
2003–04	EHF Cup	6	4	0	2	185	166	+19	Quarter-finals
2004–05	Cup Winners' Cup	8	6	0	2	290	255	+35	Quarter-finals
2005–06	Cup Winners' Cup	6	4	0	2	202	136	+66	Round 4
2022–23	EHF Champions League	18	10	2	6	551	528	+23	Quarter-finals
2023–24	EHF Champions League	14	4	1	9	366	399	-33	Group stage
2024–25	EHF Champions League	16	2	2	12	396	474	-78	Play-offs
2025–26	EHF European League	12	7	2	3	362	329	+33	Quarter-finals
Total		153	83	12	58	3962	3642	+320	

Pld – Played; W – Won; D – Drawn; L – Lost; GF – Goals for; GA – Goals against; Diff – Difference.

== European record ==
Season	Competition	Round	Club	Home	Away	Aggregate
1962–63	European Champions Cup	First round	(Hungary) Budapesti Spartacus	16–6	4–2	20–8
1962–63	European Champions Cup	Quarter-finals	(Socialist Federal Republic of Yugoslavia) RK Lokomotiva Zagreb	13–8	6–6	19–14
1962–63	European Champions Cup	Semi-finals	(Denmark) Frederiksberg IF	6–3	7–11	13–14
1963–64	European Champions Cup	Quarter-finals	(East Germany) Fortschritt Weissenfels	5–3	8–3	13–6
1963–64	European Champions Cup	Semi-finals	(Hungary) Budapesti Spartacus	12–8	3–4	15–12
1963–64	European Champions Cup	Final	(Denmark) Helsingør IF	14–13		European Champions Cup
1967–68	European Champions Cup	First round	(Norway) Brandval Idrettslag	24–10	13–6	37–16
1967–68	European Champions Cup	Quarter-finals	(Austria) Admira Energie Wien	24–10	19–10	43–20
1967–68	European Champions Cup	Semi-finals	(East Germany) SC Empor Rostock	10–11	8–20	18–31
1992–93	IHF Cup	Preliminary round	(Greece) AC Doukas	32–14	27–21	59–35
1992–93	IHF Cup	Round of 16	(Netherlands) Zeeman Vastgoed SEW	24–17	23–22	47–39
1992–93	IHF Cup	Quarter-finals	(Belarus) Politechnik Minsk	27–20	21–28	48–48; Rapid won on away goals
1992–93	IHF Cup	Semi-finals	(Germany) SC Leipzig	26–21	21–26	47–47; 5–4 pen.
1992–93	IHF Cup	Final	(France) CSL Dijon	28–16	22–24	50–40; IHF Cup winners
1993–94	EHF Cup	Round of 16	(Ukraine) Spartak Kyiv	25–24	18–24	43–48
1994–95	City Cup	Round of 16	(Portugal) União FC de Almeirim	32–18	27–18	59–36
1994–95	City Cup	Quarter-finals	(Hungary) Vasas Budapest	19–21	14–24	33–45
1995–96	EHF Cup	Round of 16	(Croatia) ŽRK Graničar Đurđevac	26–21	30–20	56–41
1995–96	EHF Cup	Quarter-finals	(Russia) Istochnik Rostov	16–18	17–30	33–48
1996–97	City Cup	Round of 16	(Switzerland) TV Uster	27–18	23–23	50–41
1996–97	City Cup	Quarter-finals	(Denmark) Ikast F.S.	18–24	18–28	36–52
1999–2000	City Cup	Round of 16	(Belarus) Arkatron RTsOP Minsk	50–29	42–23	92–52
1999–2000	City Cup	Quarter-finals	(France) Cercle Dijon Bourgogne	28–23	23–20	51–43
1999–2000	City Cup	Semi-finals	(Croatia) ŽRK Osijek	28–24	28–19	56–43
1999–2000	City Cup	Final	(Denmark) Randers HK	30–25	26–26	56–51
2000–01	Cup Winners' Cup	Round 4	(Ukraine) Motor Zaporizhzhia	22–25	17–32	39–57
2001–02	Challenge Cup	Round 3	(Italy) EOS Siracusa	39–16	31–15	70–31
2001–02	Challenge Cup	Round 4	(France) Handball Cercle Nîmes	27–20	21–26	48–46
2001–02	Challenge Cup	Quarter-finals	(Germany) DJK/MJC Trier	35–26	29–24	64–50
2001–02	Challenge Cup	Semi-finals	(Romania) Universitatea Remin Deva	24–25	19–21	43–46
2002–03	EHF Cup	Round 2	(Turkey) Üsküdar B.S.K.	36–26	32–30	68–56
2002–03	EHF Cup	Round 3	(North Macedonia) RK Tutunski Kombinat Prilep	48–21	38–15	86–36
2002–03	EHF Cup	Round 4	(Hungary) Cornexi Alcoa	31–27	24–29	55–56
2003–04	EHF Champions League	Qualification round 1	(Slovakia) Iuventa Michalovce	33–23	30–30	63–53
2003–04	EHF Champions League	Qualification round 2	(Spain) El Osito L'Eliana Valencia	26–22	24–32	50–54
2003–04	EHF Cup	Round 3	(Austria) McDonald's Wiener Neustadt	30–21	34–29	64–50
2003–04	EHF Cup	Round of 16	(France) Cercle Dijon Bourgogne	34–31	33–27	67–58
2003–04	EHF Cup	Quarter-finals	(Denmark) Viborg HK	25–28	29–30	54–58
2004–05	Cup Winners' Cup	Round 2	(Belarus) Gorodnichanka Grodno	42–32	46–31	88–63
2004–05	Cup Winners' Cup	Round 3	(Slovakia) SKP Banská Bystrica	38–23	31–28	69–51
2004–05	Cup Winners' Cup	Round 4	(Turkey) Havelsan Ankara	44–41	37–38	81–79
2004–05	Cup Winners' Cup	Quarter-finals	(Norway) Tertnes Bergen	28–22	24–40	52–62
2005–06	Cup Winners' Cup	Round 2	(Cyprus) C.S. Baracuda Handball	52–13	45–20	97–33
2005–06	Cup Winners' Cup	Round 3	(Switzerland) ZMC Amicitia Zürich	26–22	29–26	55–48
2005–06	Cup Winners' Cup	Round 4	(France) ES Besançon Féminin	25–29	25–26	50–55
2022–23	EHF Champions League	Group stage Group B	(Hungary) Győri Audi ETO KC	30–27	30–32	4th
2022–23	EHF Champions League	Group stage Group B	(France) Metz Handball	32–32	34–36	4th
2022–23	EHF Champions League	Group stage Group B	(Denmark) Team Esbjerg	34–32	30–35	4th
2022–23	EHF Champions League	Group stage Group B	(Montenegro) ŽRK Budućnost Podgorica	39–29	30–30	4th
2022–23	EHF Champions League	Group stage Group B	(Norway) Storhamar HE	27–25	36–29	4th
2022–23	EHF Champions League	Group stage Group B	(Turkey) Kastamonu Bld. GSK	28–22	33–26	4th
2022–23	EHF Champions League	Group stage Group B	(Croatia) RK Lokomotiva Zagreb	27–22	31–27	4th
2022–23	EHF Champions League	Playoffs	(Slovenia) RK Krim Mercator	30–24	24–29	54–53
2022–23	EHF Champions League	Quarter-finals	(Norway) Vipers Kristiansand	25–31	31–40	56–71
2023–24	EHF Champions League	Group stage Group B	(Denmark) Team Esbjerg	24–33	28–30	7th
2023–24	EHF Champions League	Group stage Group B	(France) Metz Handball	31–34	22–33	7th
2023–24	EHF Champions League	Group stage Group B	(Norway) Vipers Kristiansand	30–29	30–35	7th
2023–24	EHF Champions League	Group stage Group B	(Hungary) FTC-Rail Cargo Hungaria	20–23	24–24	7th
2023–24	EHF Champions League	Group stage Group B	(Slovenia) RK Krim Mercator	27–22	24–25	7th
2023–24	EHF Champions League	Group stage Group B	(Poland) Zagłębie Lubin	26–25	24–21	7th
2023–24	EHF Champions League	Group stage Group B	(Denmark) Ikast Håndbold	27–35	29–30	7th
2024–25	EHF Champions League	Group stage Group B	(Denmark) Team Esbjerg	26–28	32–39	6th
2024–25	EHF Champions League	Group stage Group B	(Montenegro) ŽRK Budućnost Podgorica	32–27	21–21	6th
2024–25	EHF Champions League	Group stage Group B	(Germany) HB Ludwigsburg	29–37	24–30	6th
2024–25	EHF Champions League	Group stage Group B	(Norway) Vipers Kristiansand	10–0	30–30	6th
2024–25	EHF Champions League	Group stage Group B	(Denmark) Odense Håndbold	25–42	24–32	6th
2024–25	EHF Champions League	Group stage Group B	(France) Brest Bretagne Handball	31–34	21–33	6th
2024–25	EHF Champions League	Group stage Group B	(Hungary) Győri Audi ETO KC	25–28	20–31	6th
2024–25	EHF Champions League	Play-offs	(Romania) CSM București	24–34	22–28	46–62
2025–26	EHF European League	Qualification round 2	(Austria) Hypo Niederösterreich	30–19	32–24	62–43
2025–26	EHF European League	Qualification round 3	(Germany) HSG Bensheim/Auerbach Flames	28–34	32–21	60–55
2025–26	EHF European League	Group stage Group C	(Croatia) HC Lokomotiva Zagreb	24–29	28–28	2nd
2025–26	EHF European League	Group stage Group C	(Norway) Tertnes Bergen	32–32	30–28	2nd
2025–26	EHF European League	Group stage Group C	(Germany) VfL Oldenburg	34–30	34–23	2nd
2025–26	EHF European League	Quarter-finals	(Denmark) Viborg HK	32–26	26–35	58–61

=== Individual awards in the EHF Champions League ===
Season	Player	Award
2022–23	(Spain) Jennifer Gutiérrez	EHF Excellence Awards nominee – Left Wing; EHF Champions League Team of the Week, Round 11

=== Individual awards in the EHF Champions League ===
Season	Player	Award
No individual season awards confirmed.

=== EHF Excellence Awards ===
Season	Player	Award
2022/23	(Spain) Jennifer Gutiérrez	Nominee – Left Wing of the Season
2024/25	(Angola) Albertina Kassoma	Nominee – Line Player of the Season

=== Statistic top players ===
==== EHF Champions League Top 10 Goalscorers ====
- (All-time). – Last updated on 30 March 2025

Place	Name	Seasons	Goals
1	(Hungary) Dorina Korsós	3	139
2	(Serbia) Anđela Janjušević	3	126
3	(Romania) Sorina Grozav	3	120
4	(Angola) Albertina Kassoma	3	106
5	(Netherlands) Estavana Polman	3	103
6	(Romania) Eliza Buceschi	3	102
7	(France) Orlane Kanor	2	100
8	(Spain) Marta López	3	80
9	(Spain) Alicia Fernández	3	69
10	(Romania) Lorena Ostase	3	55

==== Domestic Competitions Top 10 Goalscorers ====
- (All-time). – Last updated on 2 July 2026

Place	Name	Seasons	Goals
1	To be confirmed	—	—
2	To be confirmed	—	—
3	To be confirmed	—	—
4	To be confirmed	—	—
5	To be confirmed	—	—
6	To be confirmed	—	—
7	To be confirmed	—	—
8	To be confirmed	—	—
9	To be confirmed	—	—
10	To be confirmed	—	—

==== Individual nominations and awards in the EHF Champions League ====
Season	Player	Award / nomination
2022–23	(Spain) Jennifer Gutiérrez	EHF Excellence Awards nominee – Best Left Wing of the Season

Last updated on 2 July 2026

==== Domestic Competitions Top 10 Goalscorers ====
- (All-time). – Last updated on 2 July 2026

Place	Name	Seasons	Goals
1	To be confirmed	—	—
2	To be confirmed	—	—
3	To be confirmed	—	—
4	To be confirmed	—	—
5	To be confirmed	—	—
6	To be confirmed	—	—
7	To be confirmed	—	—
8	To be confirmed	—	—
9	To be confirmed	—	—
10	To be confirmed	—	—

==== Individual awards in the EHF Champions League ====
Season	Player	Award
2022–23	To be confirmed	—
2023–24	To be confirmed	—
2024–25	To be confirmed	—

Last updated on 2 July 2026
