= Jennifer Gutiérrez =

Jennifer Gutiérrez may refer to:

- Jennifer Gutiérrez (politician), politician from New York City
- Jennifer Gutiérrez Bermejo, Spanish handballer
- Jennifer Gutierrez (triathlete), American triathlete
