= Djazz Chambertin =

French handball player (born 1997)

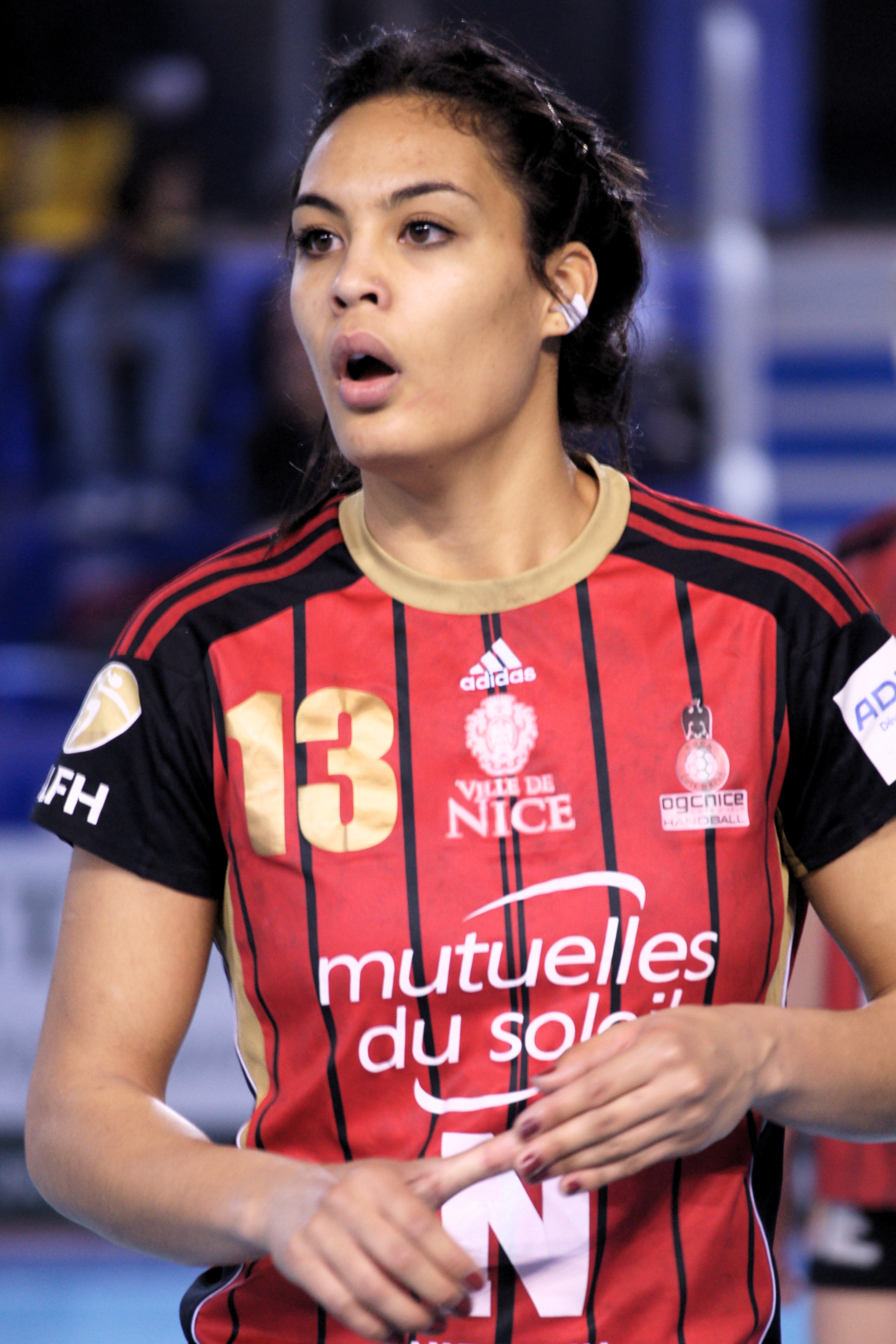

Personal information
- Full name: Djazz Chambertin
- Nationality: French
- Born: 24 June 1997 (age 29) Ravenna, Italy
- Height: 1.77 m (5 ft 10 in)

Sport
- Sport: Handball
- Position: Left back
- Current club: CS Rapid București
- Number: 13

Youth career
- Years: Team
- 2015–2019: OGC Nice Côte d'Azur Handball

Senior clubs
- Years: Team
- 2019–2023: OGC Nice Côte d'Azur Handball
- 2023–2025: Metz Handball
- 2025–: CS Rapid București
National team
Years	Team	Apps	(Gls)
2023–	France	8	(4)
- Updated on 28 August 2025

Djazz Chambertin (born 24 June 1997) is a French professional handballer for CS Rapid București in the Liga Florilor and the France national handball team.

In January 2023, she signed a one-year contract with French powerhouse Metz Handball for the 2023/24 season. In December 2023, she extended for another season until 2025.

She was also part of the 20-player squad for the 2023 World Women's Handball Championship in Danmark/Sweden/Norway.

== Achievements ==
- French Championship:
  - Runners-up: 2018, 2019
