= Mina Hesselberg =

Norwegian handball player (born 2000)

Personal information
- Nationality: Norwegian
- Born: 20 April 2000 (age 26) Langhus, Norway
- Height: 1.77 m (5 ft 10 in)

Sport
- Sport: Handball
- Position: Left wing
- Current club: Rapid București
- Number: 21

Senior clubs
- Years: Team
- 2016–12/2021: Follo HK Damer
- 01/2022–01/2025: Vipers Kristiansand
- 02/2025–06/2025: Larvik HK
- 2025–: Rapid București
National team
Years	Team	Apps	(Gls)
2025–	Norway	7	(8)

Mina Hesselberg (born 20 April 2000) is a Norwegian handball player for Rapid București.

She is also a part of Norway's national recruit team in handball.

Hesselberg started her career as a back, but retrained as a wing in 2021.

On 19 September 2025, Hesselberg made her debut on the Norwegian national team against Turkey, scoring five goals.

== Achievements ==
- EHF Champions League:
  - Winner: 2021/2022, 2022/2023
- REMA 1000-ligaen:
  - Winner: 2021/2022, 2022/2023, 2023/2024
  - Bronze: 2024/2025
- Norwegian Cup:
  - Winner: 2022/23, 2023/24
