= Diana Ciucă =

Romanian handball player (born 2000)

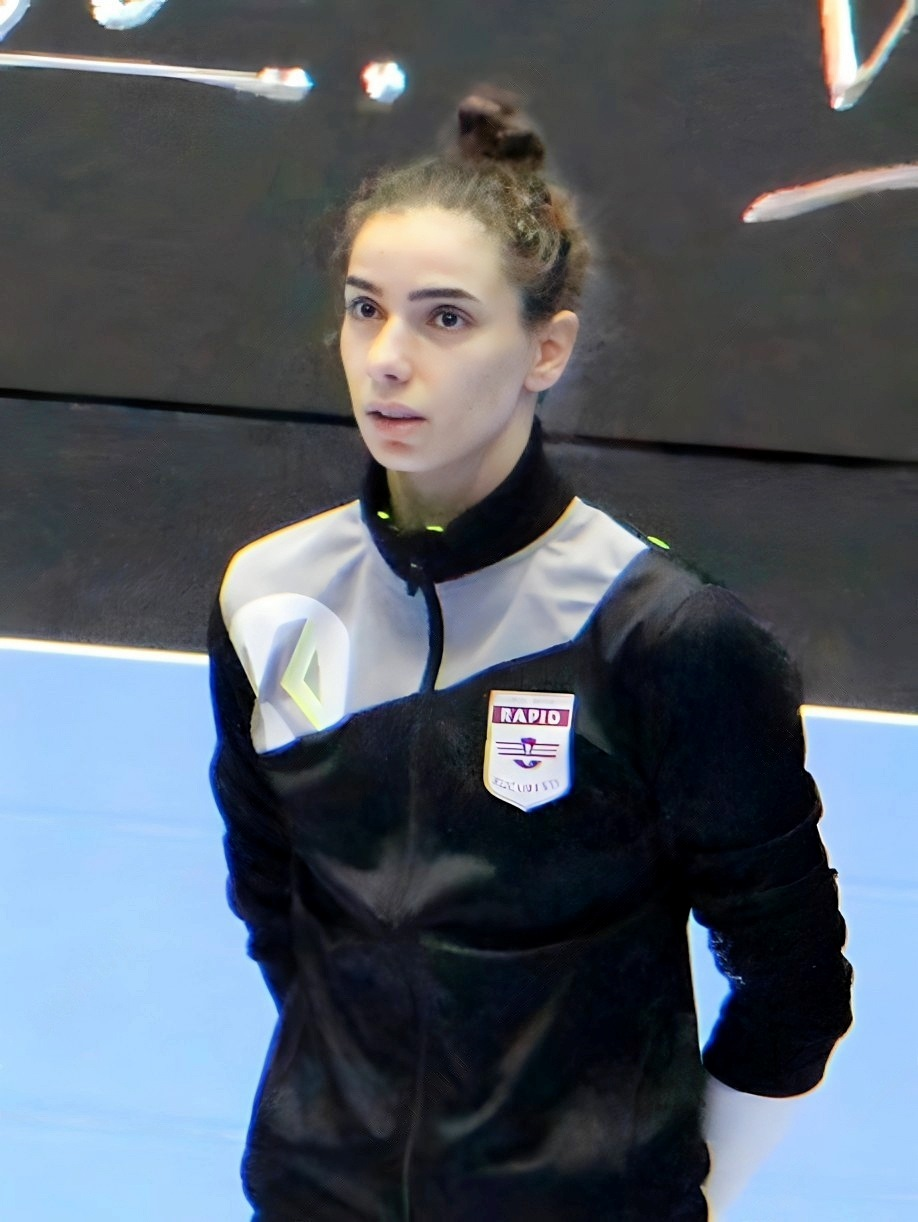

Personal information
- Full name: Diana Cristiana Ciucă
- Nationality: Romanian
- Born: 1 June 2000 (age 26) Craiova, Romania
- Height: 1.80 m (5 ft 11 in)

Sport
- Sport: Handball
- Position: Goalkeeper
- Current club: CS Rapid București
- Number: 12

Youth career
- Years: Team
- –2017: SCM Craiova

Senior clubs
- Years: Team
- 2017–2021: SCM Râmnicu Vâlcea
- 2021–: CS Rapid București
National team
Years	Team	Apps	(Gls)
2019–	Romania	6	(0)
Medal record
Youth European Olympic Festival
Silver medal – second place	2017 Hungary

Diana Cristiana Ciucă (born 1 June 2000) is a Romanian handball player for CS Rapid București and the Romanian national team.

In September 2018, she was included by EHF in a list of the twenty best young handballers to watch for the future.

She represented Romania at the 2019 World Women's Handball Championship.

== Achievements ==
- Liga Națională:
  - Winner: 2019, 2022
- Supercupa României:
  - Winner: 2018
- Cupa României:
  - Finalist: 2018
- Youth European Olympic Festival:
  - Silver Medalist: 2017

== Individual awards ==
- All-Star Goalkeeper of the Youth European Championship: 2017
