= Alina Iordache =

Romanian handball player (born 1982)

Personal information
- Full name: Alina Iordache
- Nationality: Romanian
- Born: 22 March 1982 (age 44) Bucharest, Romania
- Height: 1.77 m (5 ft 10 in)

Sport
- Sport: Handball
- Position: Goalkeeper
- Current club: SCM Gloria Buzău

Senior clubs
- Years: Team
- –2008: CS Rapid CFR București
- 2008–2010: HM Buzău
- 2010–2018: CSM București
- 2018–: SCM Gloria Buzău

Alina Iordache (born 22 March 1982) is a Romanian handballer who plays for SCM Gloria Buzău.

She was given the award of Cetățean de onoare ("Honorary Citizen") of the city of Bucharest in 2016.

== International honours ==
- EHF Champions League:
  - Winner: 2016
  - Bronze Medalist: 2017, 2018
