= Ainhoa Hernández =

Spanish handball player (born 1994)

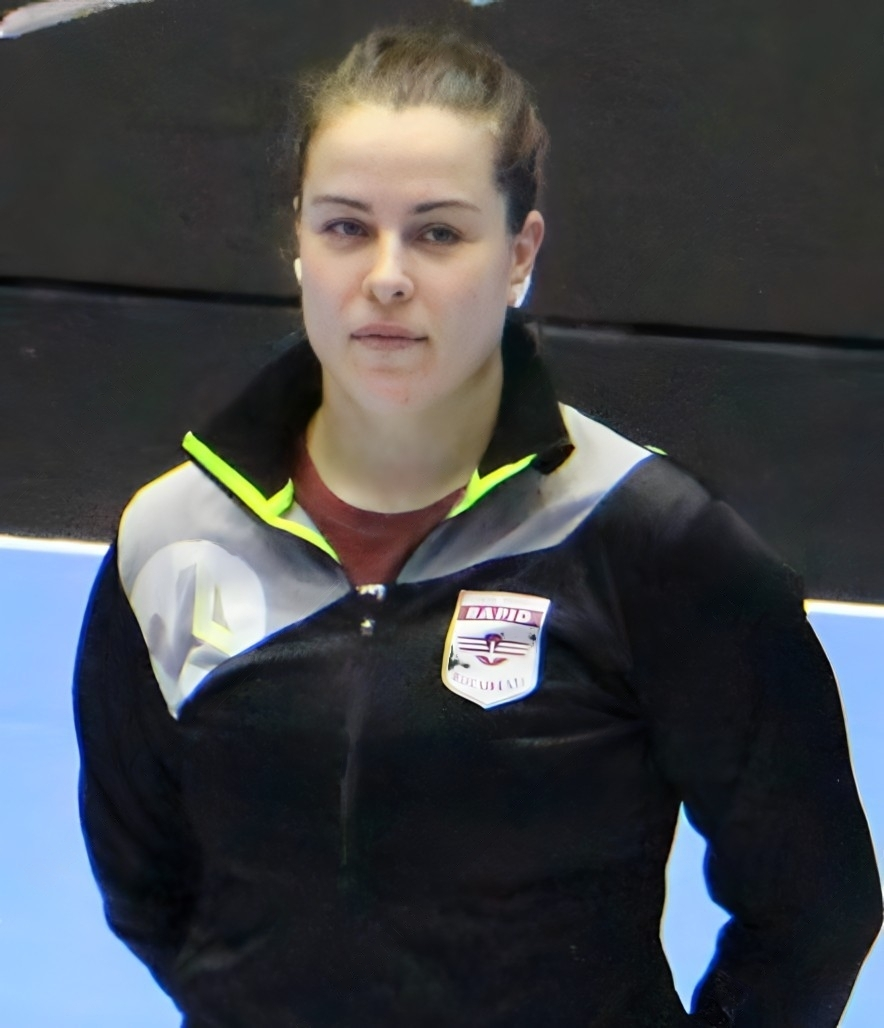

Personal information
- Full name: Ainhoa Hernández Serrador
- Nationality: Spanish
- Born: 27 April 1994 (age 32) Barakaldo, Spain
- Height: 1.80 m (5 ft 11 in)

Sport
- Sport: Handball
- Position: Pivot
- Current club: Rapid București
- Number: 7

Senior clubs
- Years: Team
- 2012–2021: Prosetecnisa Zuazo
- 2021–2025: Rapid București
National team
| Years | Team | Apps | (Gls) |
| 2013– | Spain | 117 | (173) |
Medal record
World Championship
| Silver medal – second place | 2019 Japan |
Mediterranean Games
| Gold medal – first place | 2018 Tarragona | Team |
- Updated on 23 July 2023

Ainhoa Hernández Serrador (Note: In this Spanish name, the first or paternal surname is Hernández and the second or maternal family name is Serrador.) (born 27 April 1994) is a Spanish handball player for Rapid București and the Spanish national team.

She competed at the 2015 World Women's Handball Championship in Denmark.

At the 2019 World Championship she won silver medals with the Spanish team. In the final she got a controversial red card and had a penalty called against her with seconds to go, when she blocked Tess Wester, the Dutch goalkeeper's pass out of the 6 yard area to start a potential counter. The score at the time was 29:29, and the Dutch penalty which Lois Abbingh converted, would go on to decide the game.
