= Laura Kanor =

French handball player (born 1997)

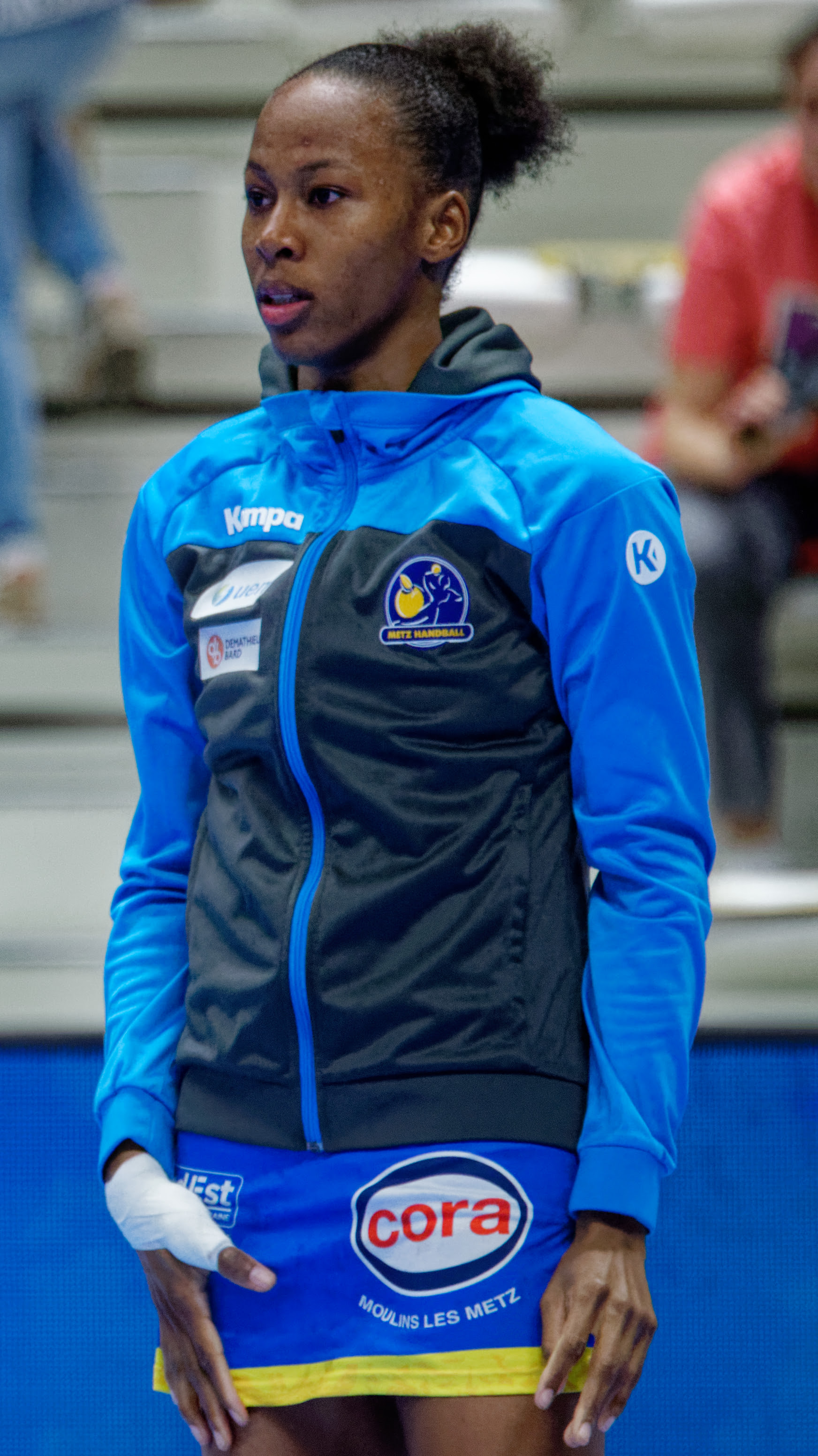
- Laura Kanor (2022)

Personal information
- Nationality: French
- Born: 16 June 1997 (age 29) Les Abymes, Guadeloupe
- Height: 1.75 m (5 ft 9 in)

Sport
- Sport: Handball
- Position: Left wing
- Current club: Brest Bretagne Handball
- Number: 22

Youth career
- Years: Team
- 2015-2019: Metz Handball

Senior clubs
- Years: Team
- 2017–2023: Metz Handball
- 2023–2024: Rapid București
- 2024-: Brest Bretagne Handball
National team
- Years: Team
- –: France

Laura Kanor (born 16 June 1997) is a French handball player for Brest Bretagne Handball.

== Career ==
With Metz Handball she won the French championship and cup in 2019, 2022 and 2023. In the 2023–2024 season she played for Rapid București, where her twin sister also played. In 2024 she returned to France to join Brest Bretagne Handball.

== Private ==
She has an identical twin sister named Orlane Kanor who is a handballer for Metz Handball.
