= 2005–06 EHF Women's Cup Winners' Cup =

The 2005–06 EHF Women's Cup Winners' Cup was the 30th edition of EHF's competition for women's handball national cup champions. It ran from October 1, 2005 to May 20, 2006.

1985 champion Budućnost Podgorica, now representing Serbia and Montenegro, won its third European trophy and the first one since the break-up of Yugoslavia, beating Győri ETO, which defeated defending champion Larvik HK in the semifinals. It was Győri ETO's fourth lost European final in five years.

== Results ==
First preliminary round. October 1–9, 2005

Local team	Aggregate	Away team	1st leg	2nd leg
McDonald's Wiener Neustadt (Austria)	51–41	(Netherlands) Zeeman Vestgoed	29–21	22–20
Váci NKSE (Hungary)	60–52	(Slovakia) SKP Banská Bystrica	33–24	27–28
Assomada Carnaxide (Portugal)	47–81	(Serbia and Montenegro) HC Naisa	22–38	25–43
Vicianet Mitrovice (Kosovo)	29–85	(Germany) Bayer Leverkusen	13–44	16–41
UMF Stjarnan (Iceland)	66–67	(Turkey) Anadolu Üniversitesi	39–34	27–33
Zaglebie Lubin (Poland)	73–39	(North Macedonia) Gjorče Petrov Skopje	30–16	43–23
Amicitia Zürich (Switzerland)	48–37	(Belgium) Sporting Neerpelt	25–19	23–18
Rapid Bucharest (Romania)	97–33	(Moldova) CS Baracuda	52–13	45–20
Galychanka Lviv (Ukraine)	50–54	(Greece) Ormi Patras	26–27	24–27
Sola HK (Norway)	90–26	(Cyprus) SPES Kefalovrysos	53–11	37–15
Kuban Krasnodar (Russia)	72–43	(Slovenia) Celeia Zalec	38–27	34–16
SD Itxako (Spain)	83–15	(Israel) Hapoel Kiryat Ono	40–10	43–5

Second preliminary round January 7–15, 2006
(Norway) Gjerpen IF	36	29	65
(Austria) McDonald's Wr. Neustadt	31	29	60
(Hungary) Váci NKSE	32	24	56
(Serbia and Montenegro) HC Naisa	26	26	52
(Germany) Bayer Leverkusen	34	41	75
(Turkey) Anadolu üniversitesi	21	22	43
(Poland) Zaglebie Lubin	28	27	55
(Denmark) Horsens HK	28	32	60
(Switzerland) Amicitia Zürich	26	22	48
(Romania) Rapid Bucharest	29	26	55
(Greece) Ormi Patras	26	25	51
(France) ES Besançon	26	34	60
(Norway) Sola HK	25	24	49
(Russia) Kuban Krasnodar	30	25	55
(Croatia) Lokomotiva Zagreb	24	14	38
(Spain) SD Itxako	17	23	40

Third preliminary round February 12–19, 2006
(Norway) Gjerpen IF	37	27	64
(Hungary) Váci NKSE	23	25	48
(Germany) Bayer Leverkusen	26	31	57
(Denmark) Horsens HK	24	31	55
(Romania) Rapid Bucharest	25	25	50
(France) ES Besançon	29	26	55
(Russia) Kuban Krasnodar	27	17	44
(Spain) SD Itxako	19	29	48

Quarterfinals; March 11–19, 2006
(Hungary) Dunaferr Dunaújváros	32	28	60
(Norway) Gjerpen IF	32	29	61
(Germany) Bayer Leverkusen	21	23	44
(Serbia and Montenegro) Budućnost Podgorica	18	29	47
(Hungary) Győri ETO	34	30	64
(France) ES Besançon	24	33	57
(Spain) SD Itxako	17	19	36
(Norway) Larvik HK	18	31	49

Semifinals; April 15–22, 2006
(Norway) Gjerpen IF	24	29	53
(Serbia and Montenegro) Budućnost Podgorica	28	37	65
(Hungary) Győri ETO	33	22	55
(Norway) Larvik HK	28	23	51

Final; May 13–20, 2006
(Serbia and Montenegro) Budućnost Podgorica	25	26	51
(Hungary) Győri ETO	25	23	48
