= Orlane Kanor =

French handball player (born 1997)

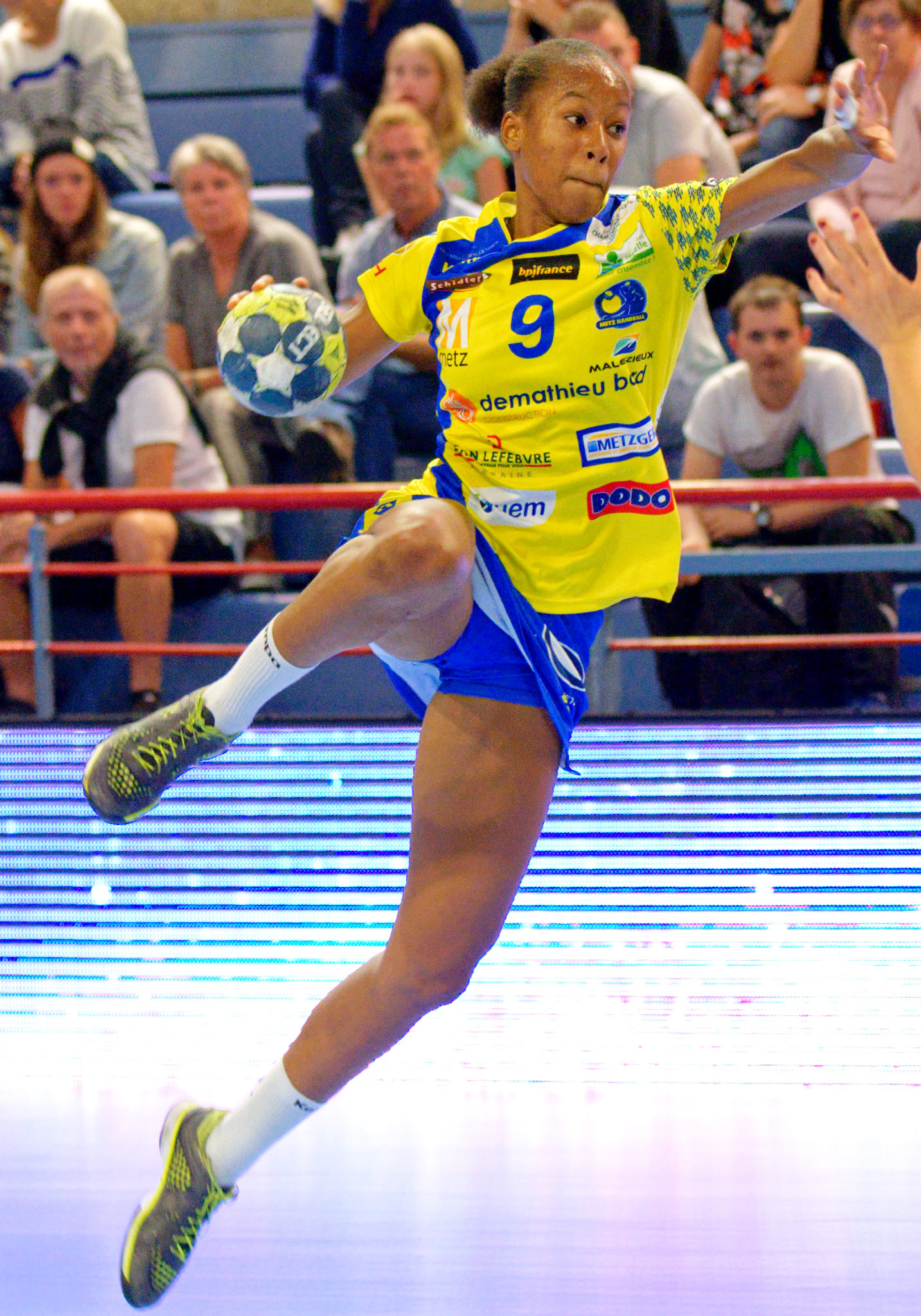
- Kanor in 2016

Personal information
- Nationality: French
- Born: 16 June 1997 (age 29) Les Abymes, Guadeloupe
- Height: 1.78 m (5 ft 10 in)

Sport
- Sport: Handball
- Position: Left back
- Current club: Rapid București
- Number: 22

Youth career
- Years: Team
- 2010-2013: Intrépide Handball Club de Sainte-Anne
- 2014-2015: Zayen Morne-à-l'Eau
- 2015-2016: Metz Handball

Senior clubs
- Years: Team
- 2016–2022: Metz Handball
- 2022–2024: Rapid București
- 2024–: Ferencvárosi TC
National team
Years	Team	Apps	(Gls)
2017–	France	100	(225)
Medal record
Olympic Games
Silver medal – second place	2024 Paris	Team
World Championship
Gold medal – first place	2017 Germany
Gold medal – first place	2023 Denmark/Norway/Sweden
Silver medal – second place	2021 Spain
Bronze medal – third place	2025 Germany/Netherlands
European Championship
Gold medal – first place	2018 France
Silver medal – second place	2020 Denmark
- Updated on 12 November 2024

Orlane Kanor (born 16 June 1997) is a French handball player for Rapid București and the French national team. She is a World champion from 2017 and 2023, and a European champion from 2018.

== Club career ==
Kanor started playing handball at Intrépide Handball Club de Sainte-Anne on Guadeloupe. She joined Metz Handball in 2015, and became a part of the first team in the 2016-17 season. With Metz she won the 2017, 2018, 2019 and 2022 French championship, and the 2017, 2019, and 2022 French Cup.

In April 2021, she ruptured her Achilles.

In 2022, she joined Romanian side Rapid București, where she played for two years. She then joined Hungarian Ferencvárosi TC.

She is known for her jumping skills in international handball.

== International career ==
Kanor debuted for the French national team on 15 June 2017. Later the same year, she won the 2017 World Championship with France. In 2018, she won the 2018 European Championship, beating Russia in the final 24-21. This was the first time France won the European Championship.

At the 2020 European Championship, she won a silver medal. She scored 11 goals during the tournament. The year after she won another silver medal at the 2021 World Championship, losing to Norway in the final.

In 2023, she won the 2023 World Championship.

At the 2024 Olympics, she won silver medals with the French team.

For the 2025 World Championship she won bronze medals losing to Germany in the semifinal and beating Netherlands in extra time in the third place playoff.

== Personal life ==
She has an identical twin sister named Laura Kanor who is a handballer for Metz Handball.

== Achievements ==
- French Championship:
  - Winner: 2016, 2017, 2018, 2019, 2022
- Coupe de France:
  - Winner: 2017, 2019, 2022

=== Individual awards ===
- Chevalier of the Ordre national du Mérite
