= Zgoda Ruda Śląska =

Polish handball club

KS Zgoda Ruda Śląska - Bielszowice
- Full name: Klub Sportowy Zgoda Ruda Śląska - Bielszowice
- Nickname(s): Bielszowiczanki
- Short name: Zgoda Ruda Śląska
- Founded: June 20, 1920; 104 years ago
- Arena: Hala Sportowa "Zgoda" Bielszowice, Ruda Śląska
- Capacity: 300
- President: Krystian Mrochen
- Head coach: Marek Płatek
- Club colours

Zgoda Ruda Śląska is a Polish women's handball team, based in Ruda Śląska.

== See also ==
- Handball in Poland
- Sports in Poland
