= 1995–96 Women's EHF Cup =

European handball tournament

The 1995–96 Women's EHF Cup was the 15th edition of the competition, running from 7 October 1994 to 12 May 1996. Defending champion Debreceni VSC defeated Larvik HK in the final, again on away goals, to become the first club to win the competition twice. CB Amadeo Tortajada and Istochnik Rostov also reached the semifinals.

== Qualifying round ==
| Team #1 | Agg. | Team #2 | 1st | 2nd |
|---|---|---|---|---|
| Avtomobilist Brovary (Ukraine) | 39–43 | (Slovenia) Olimpija Ljubljana | 23–20 | 16–23 |
| Amadeo Tortajada (Spain) | 72–28 | (Bulgaria) Gabrovo | 38–19 | 34–9 |
| Maccabi Rishon LeZion (Israel) | 29–54 | (Poland) Zaglebie Lubin | 16–28 | 13–26 |
| Plastika Nitra (Slovakia) | 53–60 | (Federal Republic of Yugoslavia) Radnički Beograd | 27–31 | 26–29 |
| Skopje (North Macedonia) | 47–36 | (Italy) Salerno | 27–19 | 20–17 |
| Kolkheti Poti (Georgia (country)) | 24–65 | (Turkey) Anadolu | 13–30 | 11–35 |
| Verias (Greece) | 39–57 | (Switzerland) Uster | 19–28 | 20–29 |
| Frankfurter (Germany) | 49–38 | (Netherlands) Westland | 27–18 | 22–20 |
| Graničar Đurđevac (Croatia) | 51–24 | (Belgium) Fémina Visé | 29–9 | 22–15 |

== Round of 16 ==
| Team #1 | Agg. | Team #2 | 1st | 2nd |
|---|---|---|---|---|
| Olimpija Ljubljana (Slovenia) | 30–45 | (Spain) Amadeo Tortajada | 18–21 | 12–24 |
| Zaglebie Lubin (Poland) | 40–42 | (Hungary) Kisvárdai SE | 24–20 | 16–22 |
| Radnički Beograd (Federal Republic of Yugoslavia) | 37–50 | (Norway) Larvik | 18–23 | 19–27 |
| Skopje (North Macedonia) | 36–49 | (France) Issy | 20–25 | 16–24 |
| Anadolu (Turkey) | 39–65 | (Denmark) GOG Gudme | 16–30 | 23–35 |
| Uster (Switzerland) | 35–54 | (Hungary) Debreceni VSC | 20–26 | 15–28 |
| Istochnik Rostov (Russia) | 48–41 | (Germany) Frankfurter | 26–16 | 22–25 |
| Graničar Đurđevac (Croatia) | 41–56 | (Romania) Rapid București | 20–30 | 21–26 |

== Quarter-finals ==
| Team #1 | Agg. | Team #2 | 1st | 2nd |
|---|---|---|---|---|
| Amadeo Tortajada (Spain) | 52–35 | (Hungary) Kisvárdai SE | 30–13 | 22–22 |
| Larvik (Norway) | 45–43 | (France) Issy | 25–18 | 20–25 |
| GOG Gudme (Denmark) | 40–40 | (Hungary) Debreceni VSC | 25–16 | 15–24 |
| Istochnik Rostov (Russia) | 48–33 | (Romania) Rapid București | 30–17 | 18–16 |

== Semifinals ==
| Team #1 | Agg. | Team #2 | 1st | 2nd |
|---|---|---|---|---|
| Amadeo Tortajada (Spain) | 43–45 | (Norway) Larvik | 26–19 | 17–26 |
| Debreceni VSC (Hungary) | 48–42 | (Russia) Istochnik Rostov | 25–20 | 23–22 |

== Final ==
| Team #1 | Agg. | Team #2 | 1st | 2nd |
|---|---|---|---|---|
| Larvik (Norway) | 38–38 | (Hungary) Debreceni VSC | 23–20 | 15–18 |
