= Jennifer Gutiérrez Bermejo =

Spanish handball player (born 1995)

Jennifer Gutiérrez
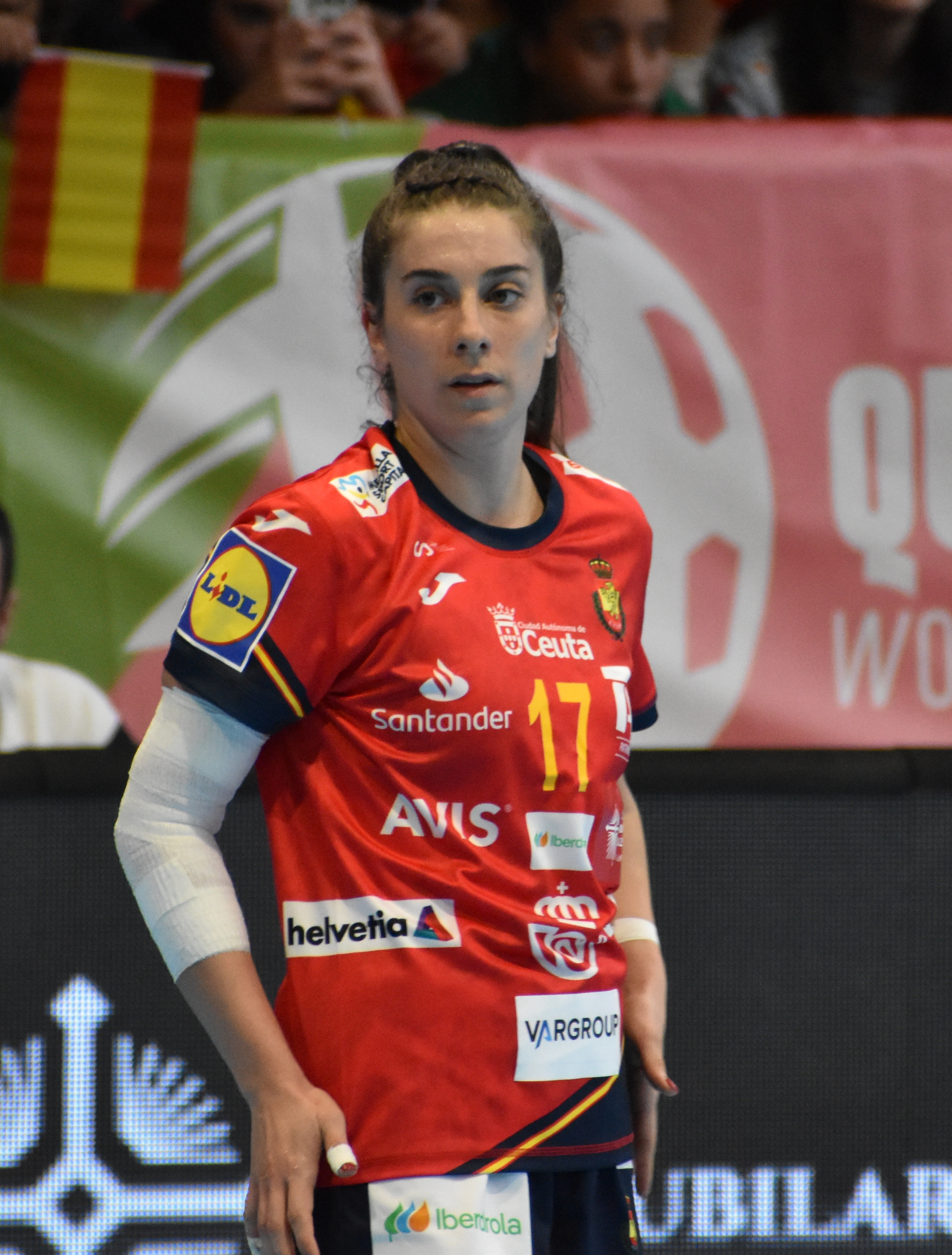
- Gutiérrez in 2024

Personal information
- Full name: Jennifer Maria Gutiérrez Bermejo
- Nationality: Swiss; Spanish
- Born: 20 February 1995 (age 31) Horgen, Switzerland
- Height: 1.69 m (5 ft 7 in)

Sport
- Sport: Handball
- Position: Left wing
- Current club: Gloria Bistrița-Năsăud
- Number: 17

Senior clubs
- Years: Team
- 2013–2014: CB Elche
- 2014–2017: Rincón Fertilidad Málaga
- 2017–2018: Mecalia Atlético Guardés
- 2018–2020: CB Elche
- 2020–2022: Borussia Dortmund
- 2022–2023: Rapid București
- 2023–2024: CSM București
- 2024–2025: RK Krim
- 2025–: Gloria Bistrița-Năsăud
National team
Years	Team	Apps	(Gls)
2017–	Spain	119	(296)
Medal record
World Championship
Silver medal – second place	2019 Japan
Mediterranean Games
Gold medal – first place	2018 Tarragona	Team
- Updated on 1 November 2025

Jennifer Maria Gutiérrez Bermejo (Note: In this Spanish name, the first or paternal surname is Gutiérrez and the second or maternal family name is Bermejo.) (born 20 February 1995) is a Swiss-born Spanish handballer for the Romanian club Gloria Bistrița-Năsăud and the Spanish national team.

She represented Spain at the 2019 World Women's Handball Championship.
