= 1. FC Nürnberg (handball) =

German handball club

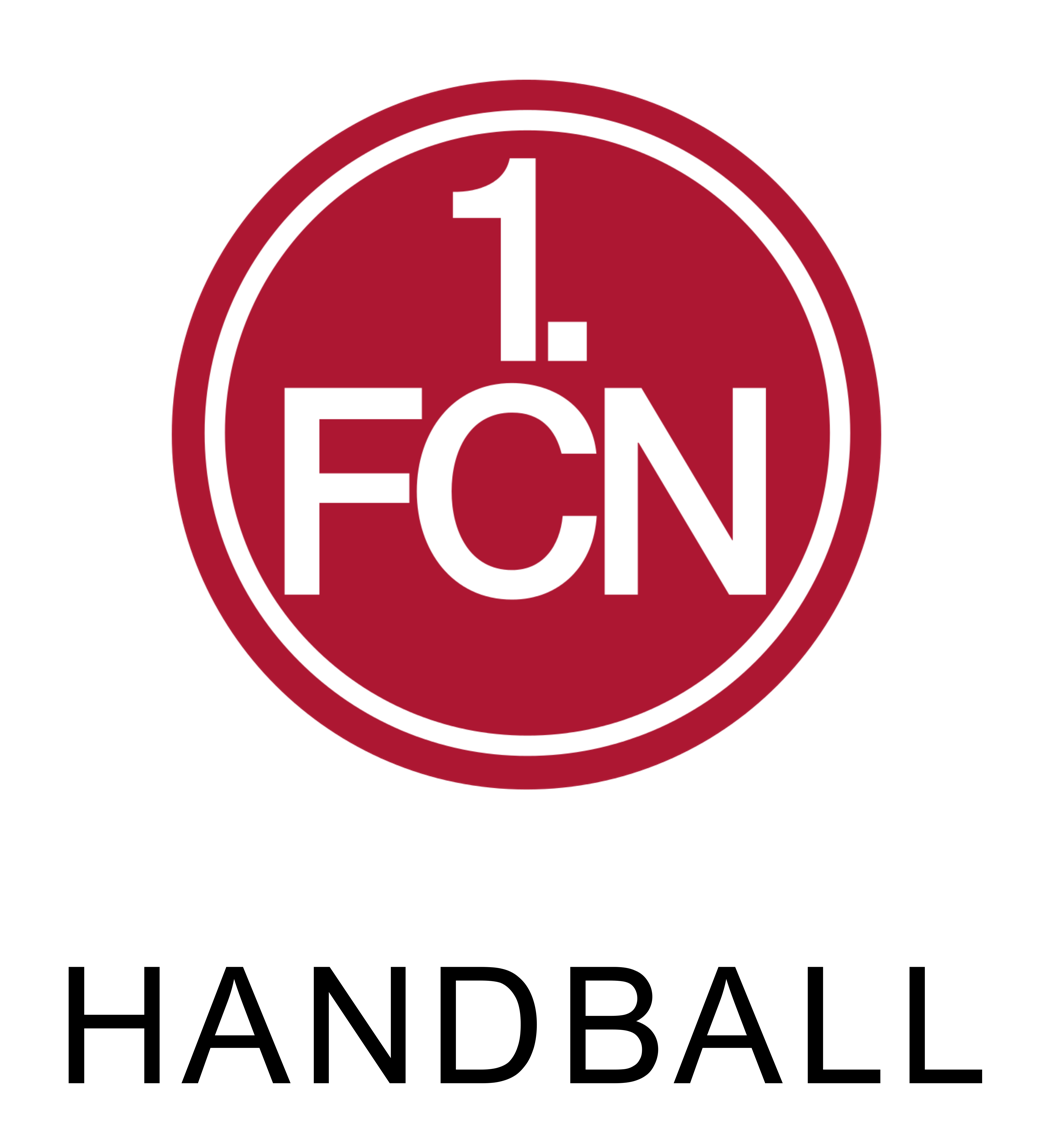
- Full name: 1. FC Nürnberg 2009 e. V.
- Founded: 2009; 16 years ago 1921; 104 years ago
- Arena: Halle am Valznerweiher
- Head coach: Susanne Knapp
- League: Oberliga
- 2023-24: 2. (promotion)
- Club colours
| Home | Away |

1. FC Nürnberg 2009 e. V. is the handball department of the German multisports club 1. FC Nürnberg. It was founded in 1921, and refounded in 1995 and 2009 due to bankruptcies.

The women's team is the most famous part of the team, winning the German field handball championship in 1961, 1963, 1964, 1965 and 1968, and the indoor championship in 1964, 1969, 1970, 2005, 2007 and 2008. They also won the EHF Challenge Cup in 2004.
